= List of foreign football players in Serbia =

This is a list of foreign players that play or have played in the top league in football clubs from the territory of Serbia.

In this list are included the foreign players that:

- Play or have played in the Serbian SuperLiga (from 2006 until nowadays), and in the clubs from the territory of Serbia in the First League of Serbia and Montenegro (including FR Yugoslavia, from 1992 until 2006) and in the Yugoslav First League (from 1923 until 1992).
- Have been part of the club roster in the league.
- Have not been capped for the Serbia national team or the Yugoslavia national team, except the ones that have been capped for other national teams, as well.
- Have been born in Serbia and capped by a foreign national team. This includes players that have dual citizenship.
- In this list are only indicated the top-level clubs. If a player has also played in some lower-level club in Serbia, those clubs are excluded, just as all the foreign players that have only played in lower leagues in Serbia.

Notes:

- The players that played in clubs from Kosovo are only included if they played in a top league club within the Yugoslav or Serbian football league system.
- The players from the countries that once made part of Yugoslavia (Bosnia and Herzegovina, Croatia, Macedonia, Montenegro and Slovenia) have inclusion criteria indicated in each section.
- The years correspond to seasons, not calendar years, and represent the seasons that the player represented the club, not necessarily being all in the top league, but at least one. If only one year is indicated in parentheses, it means that the player has played only that half of season.
- Players **in bold** are players that have at least one cap for their national team.
- Teams **in bold** are the current team of that player.

== Albania ==
- **Mehmet Dragusha** – Priština (1997–1998) – ( (Serbia and Montenegro) when active)
- **Besnik Hasi** – Priština (1991–1992, 1993–1994) – ( (Socialist Federal Republic of Yugoslavia) when active)
- **Albert Stroni** – Partizan (1992–1993)
- Faton Xhemaili – Radnik Surdulica (2018–2019)

== Algeria ==
- **Ishak Belfodil** – IMT Beograd (2024–2025)
- **Farid Boulaya** – **IMT Beograd** (2026–present)
- Adda Djeziri – Vojvodina (2017–2018)
- **Alexandre Oukidja** – **IMT Beograd** (2025–present)

== Angola ==
- **Alexander Christovão** – Javor Ivanjica (2016–2017)
- **Depú** – Vojvodina (2024–2025)
- **Felício Milson** – Red Star (2024–2026)
- **Simão Pedro** – **Železničar Pančevo** (2026–present)

== Antigua and Barbuda ==
- **Josh Parker** – Red Star (2014–2016)

== Argentina ==
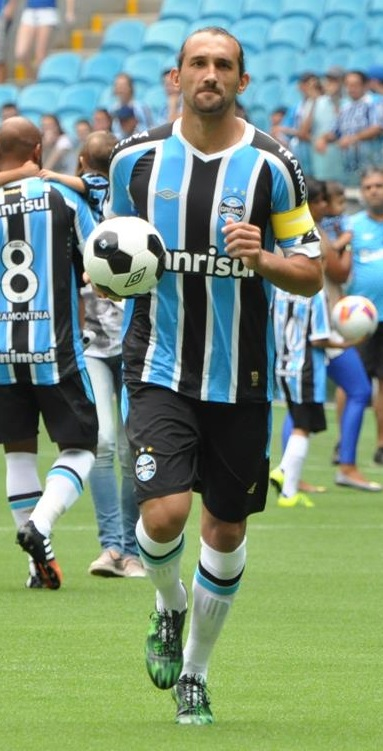
Argentine international Hernán Barcos played for Red Star in 2007/08.

- **Hernán Barcos** – Red Star (2007–2008)
- Guido Barreyro – Inđija (2010–2011)
- Mauro Carabajal – Vojvodina (1998–1999)
- Pablo Ferreira – Jedinstvo Ub (2024–2025)
- Mateo García – Red Star (2019–2020)
- Luis Ibáñez – Red Star (2015–2016)
- Cristian Jeandet – Sartid Smederevo (1998–1999)
- Hernán Marcos – Vojvodina (1998–1999)
- Augusto Max – Železničar Pančevo (2023–2024)
- **Pablo Mouche** – Red Star (2016–2017)
- Pablo Ostrowski – Vojvodina (2007–2009)
- Tomás Pérez – Jedinstvo Ub (2024–2025)
- Matías Porcari – Radnički Kragujevac (2013–2014)
- Brian Ramírez – **Spartak Subotica** (2025–present)
- Diego Suárez – OFK Beograd (2006–2007)
- Alex Vigo – Red Star (2022–2023)
- Tomás Villoldo – OFK Beograd (2015–2016)

== Armenia ==
- Barliyian – SK Zemun (1939–1949)
- **Ognjen Čančarević** – Radnički Kragujevac (2009–2014), OFK Beograd (2014–2016), Mladost Lučani (2015–(2016), Radnik Surdulica (2016–2018), **IMT** (2025–present) – ( (Serbia and Montenegro) Serbia when active)
- Hovhannes Grigoryan – Banat Zrenjanin (2006–2007)
- **Nair Tiknizyan** – **Red Star Belgrade** (2025–present)
- **Artur Yedigaryan** – Proleter Novi Sad (2019–2020)

== Australia ==
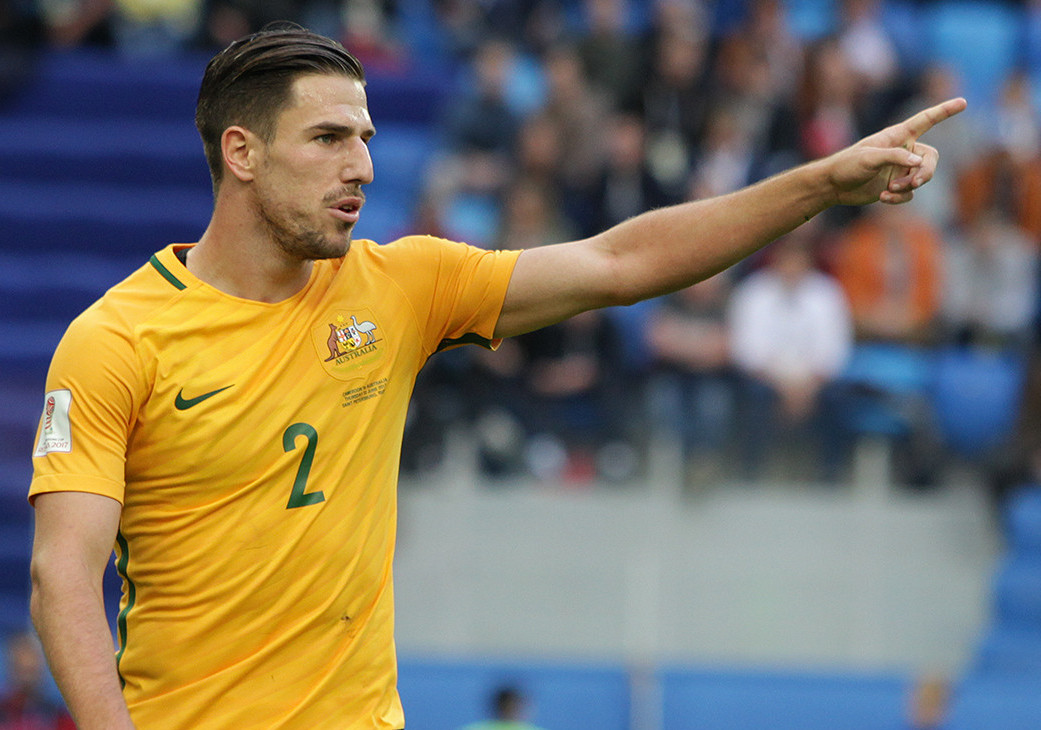
Degenek impressed in 2018 FIFA World Cup and Red Star bought him directly to their team afterwaards.

- David Aceski – OFK Beograd (2001–2002)
- Tomislav Arčaba – BSK Borča (2010–2012), OFK Beograd (2015–2017)
- **Eli Babalj** – Red Star (2012–2013)
- **Branko Buljevic** – OFK Beograd (1966–1968) – ( (Socialist Federal Republic of Yugoslavia) when active)
- Matthew Byrne – Donji Srem (2011–2013)
- **Michael Curcija** – Partizan (2000–2001)
- **Milos Degenek** – Red Star (2018–2022, 2023–2024), TSC Bačka Topola (2024–2026)
- Bobby Dragas – Red Star (2000–2001)
- **Milan Ivanović** – Red Star (1978–1982, 1985–1986, 1988–1989), OFK Beograd (1982–1985), Radnički Niš (1986–1988) – ( (Socialist Federal Republic of Yugoslavia) when active)
- Aleksandar Jovanović – Vojvodina (2007–2008), Hajduk Kula (2011–2012)
- Novak Kljajic – Radnički Niš (2024–2025)
- Andrew Marveggio – Mačva Šabac (2018–2019)
- Dejan Pandurević – Zemun (2017–2018)
- Milan Susak – Vojvodina (2002–2007)
- **Aleksandar Šušnjar** – Novi Pazar (2023–2024)
- **Doug Utjesenovic** – OFK Beograd (1967–1969) – ( (Socialist Federal Republic of Yugoslavia) when active)
- Goran Zarić – Borac Čačak (1995–1996), Vojvodina (1996–1999), Čukarički Stankom (2002–2004)

== Austria ==
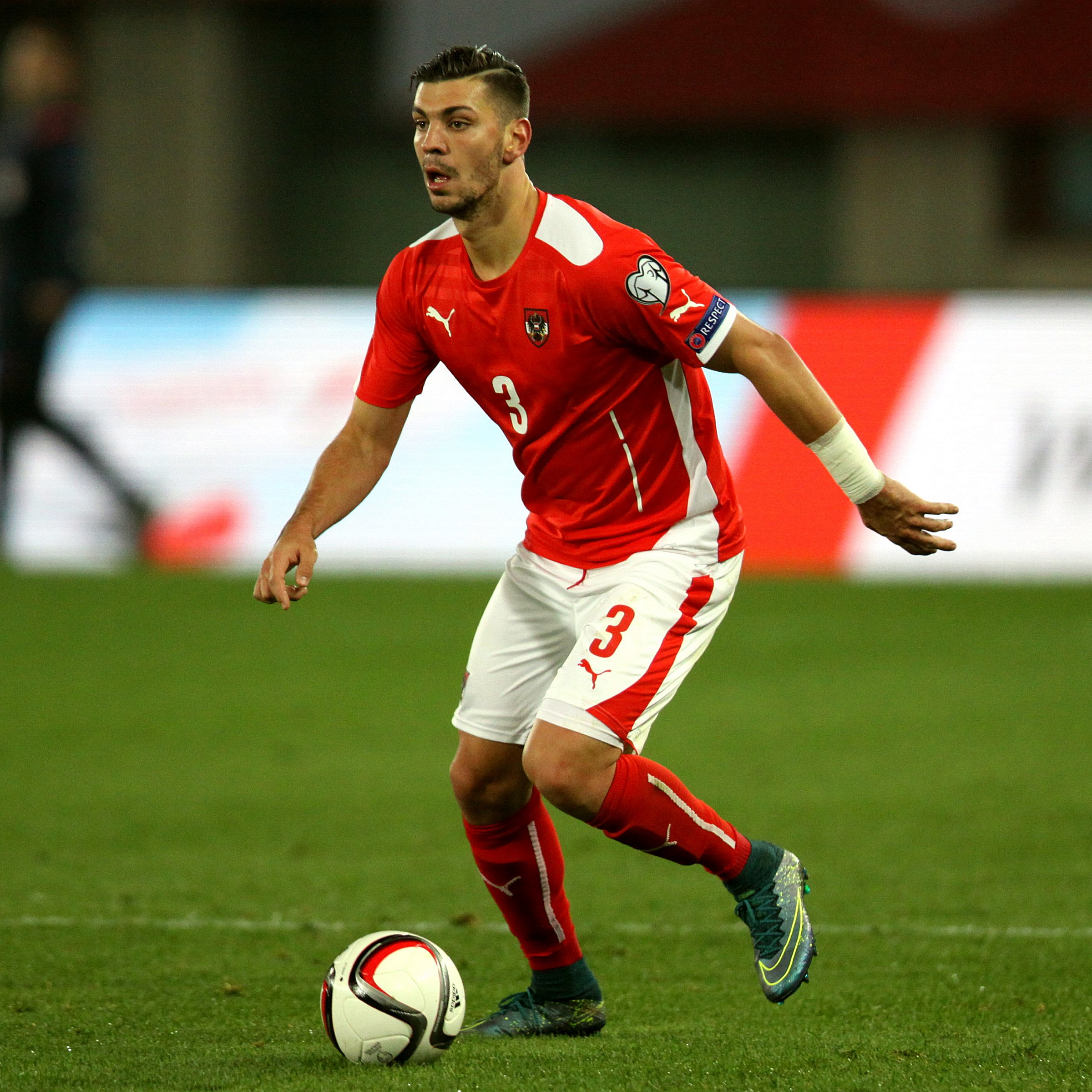
Born in Vienna with Serbian ancestry, Dragović became key player in Red Star and Austrian defense, with 100 appearances for the national team.

Including the period of Austro-Hungary.

- **Marko Arnautović** – **Red Star Belgrade** (2025–present)
- Dragoslav Burkić – Tekstilac Odžaci (2024–2025)
- Nikola Ćuruvija – FK IMT Beograd (2024)–2025, **Radnički Niš** (2025–present)
- **Aleksandar Dragović** – Red Star (2021–2025)
- Grabliker – Budućnost Valjevo (193_–1940)
- Josef Gottwald – Sport Subotica (1938)
- Otto Hofmann – Radnički Beograd (1921–192x)
- Luka Izderić – **Radnički Niš** (2024–present)
- **Goran Kartalija** – Vojvodina (1988–1991) – ( (Socialist Federal Republic of Yugoslavia) when active)
- Aleksandar Kostić – Radnički Niš (2018–2019)
- Robert Lang – Jugoslavija (1920–1921)
- Saša Lazić – Rad Beograd (2017–2018)
- Franz Machek – RFK Bor (1941–1943) – ( (Nazi Germany) when active)
- Theodor Mantler – UTK Novi Sad (1918–192_)
- Armin Mašović – Novi Pazar (2014–2015)
- Kenan Muslimović – Novi Pazar (2016–2017)
- Dejan Nešović – Radnik Surdulica (2016–2017)
- **Alexander Neufeld** (Sándor Nemes) – BSK Beograd (1932–1933)
- Dejan Obućina – Smederevo (2012–2013)
- Roman Pany – Jedinstvo Beograd (1938–1939)
- Aleksandar Popović – Vojvodina (2005–2009)
- Alexander Schönbacher – BSK Beograd (191x–1914) – ( (Austrian Empire) when active)
- Srđan Spiridonović – Red Star (2020–2022)
- Daniel Sudar – Zlatibor Čajetina (2020–2021)
- Andrej Todoroski – Spartak Subotica (2021–2024), **TSC Bačka Topola** (2025–present)
- Petar Zivkov – OFK Beograd (2013–2014)

== Azerbaijan ==
- **Murad Hüseynov** – Sloboda Užice (2013–2014)
- **Branimir Subašić** – Železnik (1998–2002), Red Star (2008–2010), OFK Beograd (2015–2017) – ( (Serbia and Montenegro) (Azerbaijan) when active)

== Belarus ==
Including the period of Soviet Union.

- Daniil Dushevskiy – OFK Beograd (2024–2025)
- Ilya Lukashevich – Proleter Novi Sad (2019–2020)
- Oleg Nikiforenko – **Radnički Niš** (2026–present)
- Aleksandr Shestyuk – **Radnički Niš** (2026–present)
- Samuilo Suzina – BSK Belgrade (1924–1925) – ( (Soviet Union) when active)

== Belgium ==
- Nathan de Medina – Partizan (2023–2025)
- Ibrahim Kargbo Jr. – Jedinstvo Ub (2024–2025)

== Benin ==
- **Mattéo Ahlinvi** – Čukarički (2023–2024)

== Bosnia and Herzegovina ==
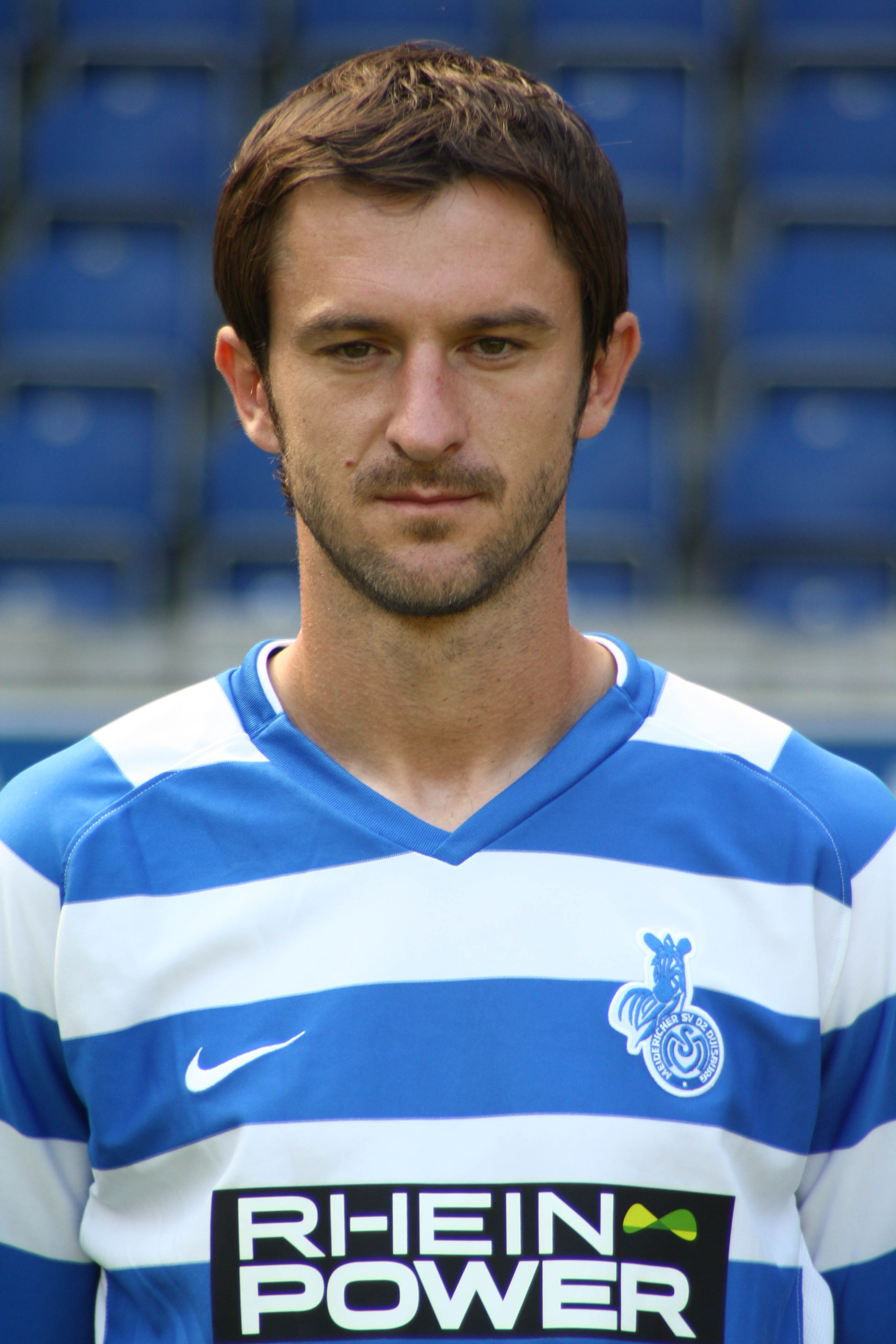
Branimir Bajić spent 7 seasons with Partizan and became regular in the Bosnian national team.

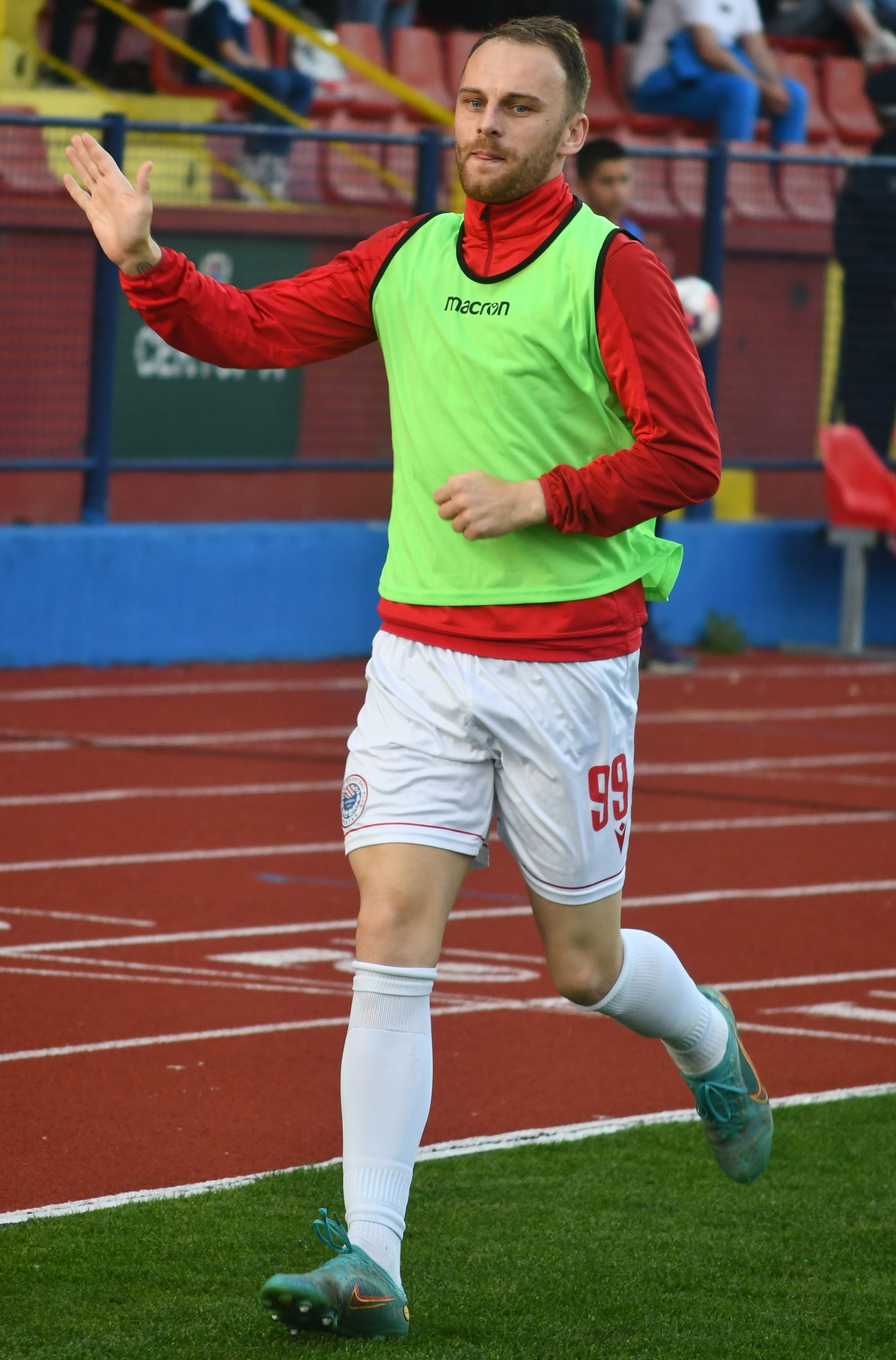
Nemanja Bilbija, Vojvodina, 4 times Bosnian Premier League top-scorer.

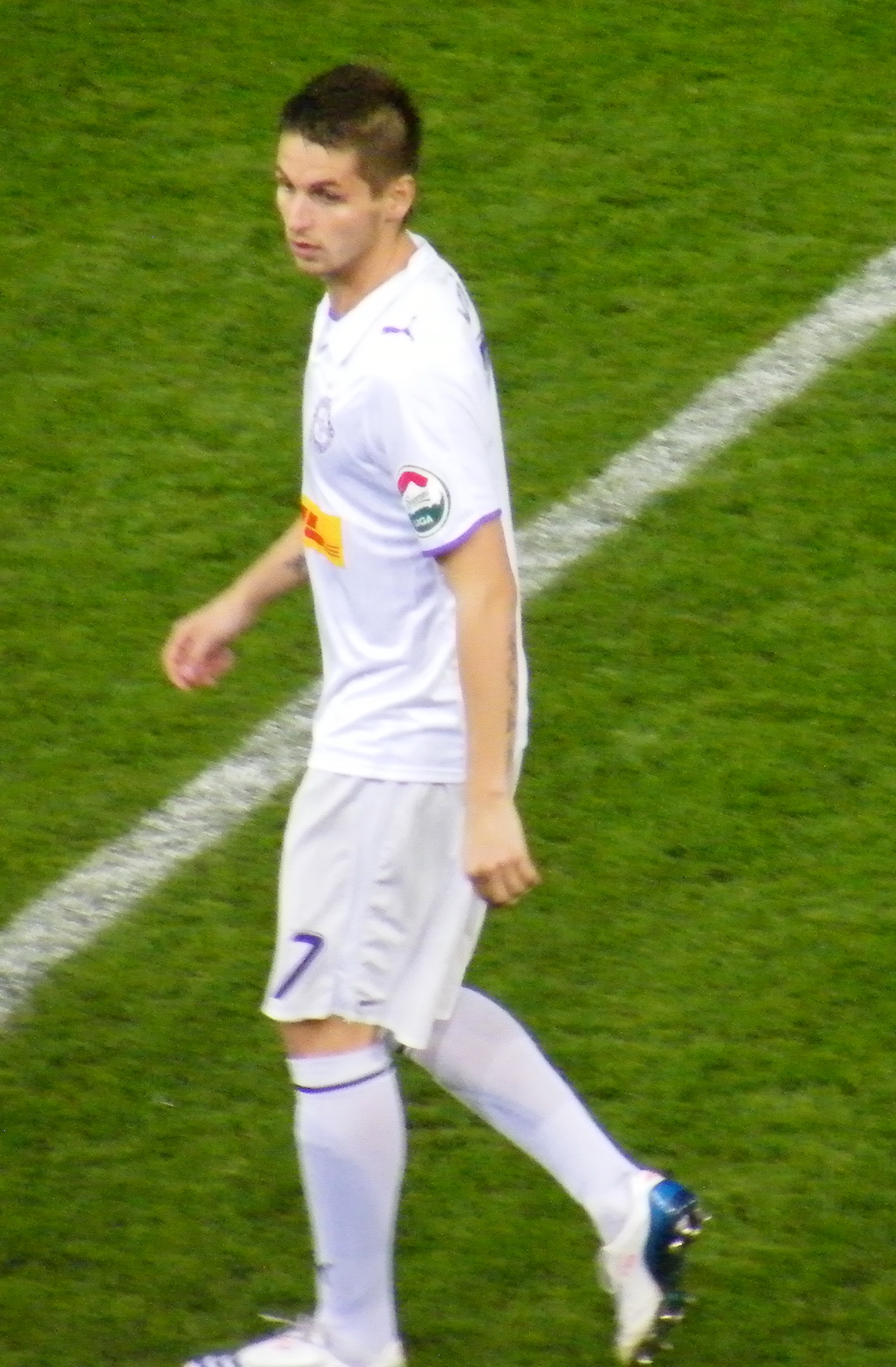
Mario Božić played in several Serbian clubs.

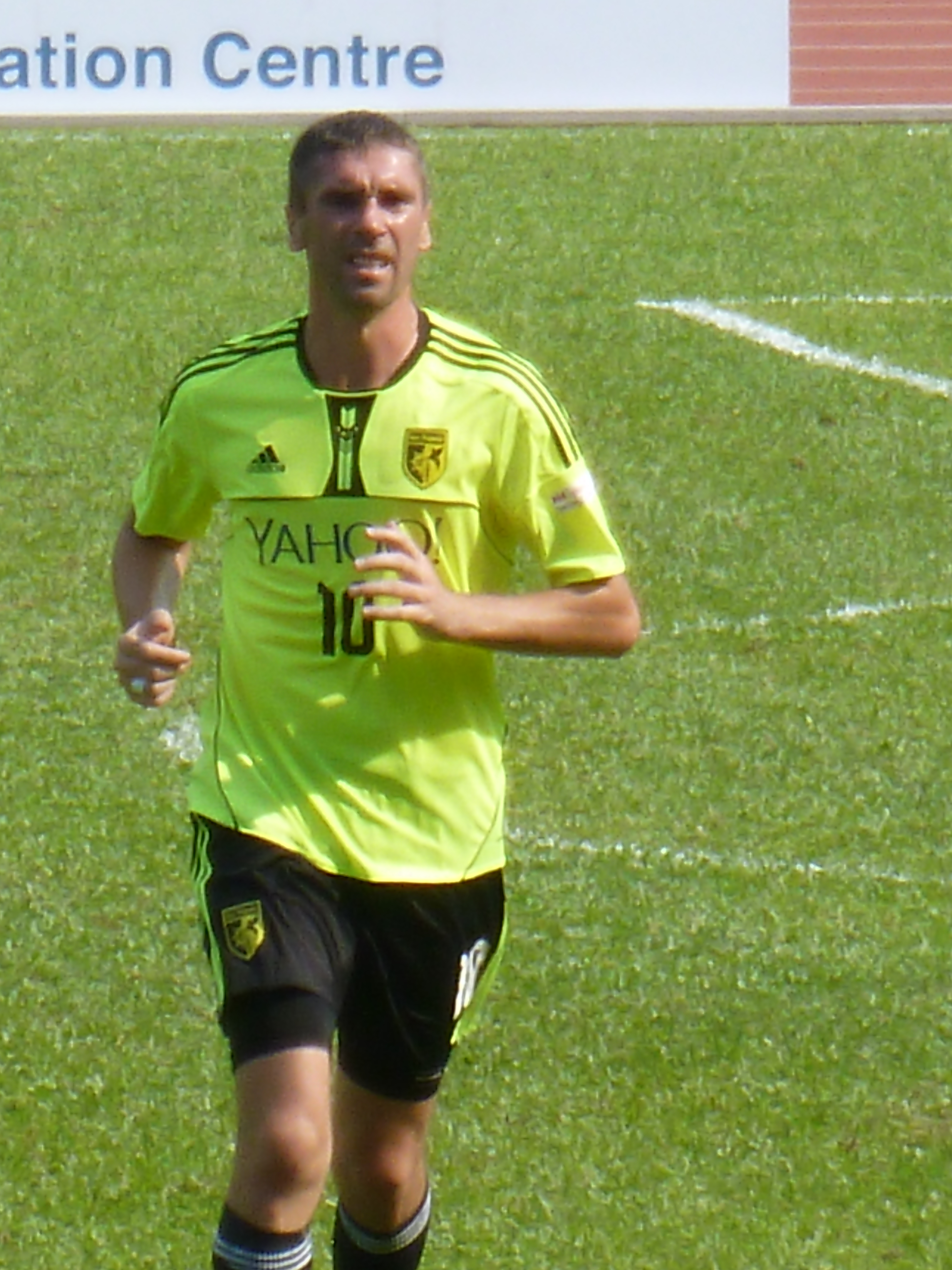
Dario Damjanović, Bosnian international with spells in Obrenovac, Novi Pazar and Jagodina.

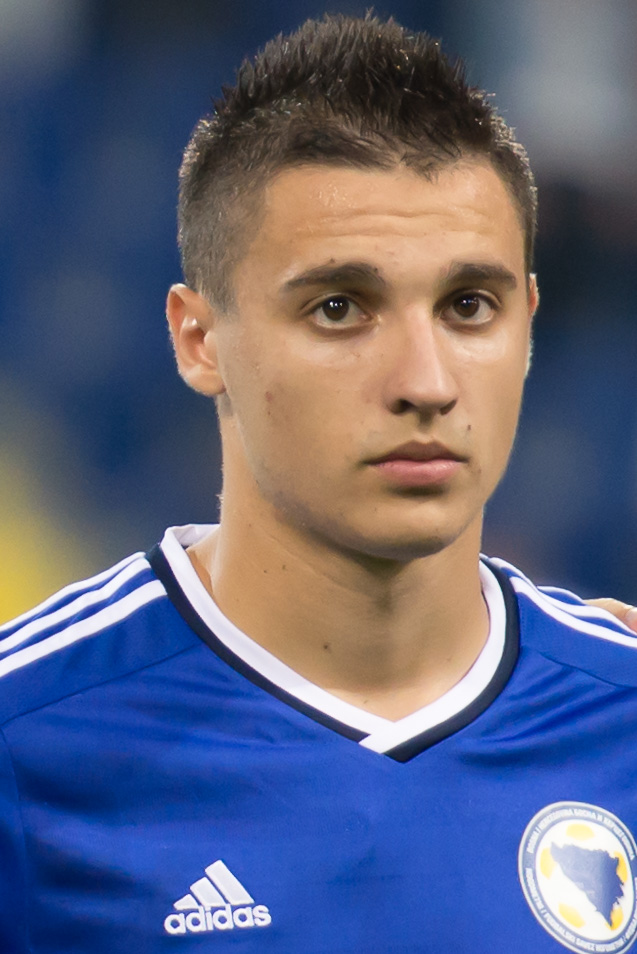
Rade Krunić, Bosnian international, played with Donji Srem and Borac Čačak before moving to Italy and joining AC Milan. In 2024/25 he joined Red Star on loan and played in the CL.

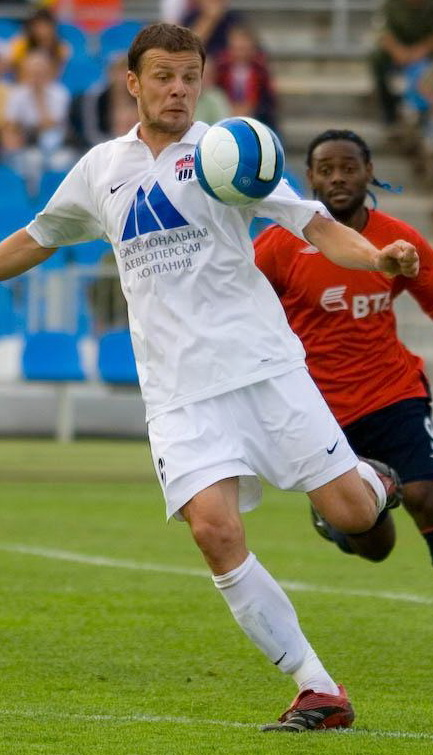
Vule Trivunović, Obilić.

Excluded the players that played before 1992 when Bosnia and Herzegovina became independent and counted as domestic, but included the players that are Bosnian Serbs and usually have double citizenship.

- Edin Ademović – Sloboda Užice (2009–2011), Novi Pazar (2011–2012), BSK Borča (2012–2013)
- **Admir Aganović** – Partizan (2003–2004), Zemun (2006–2007), Mladost Lučani (2006–2008), Čukarički Stankom (2007–2009)
- Almir Aganspahić – Novi Pazar (2020–2021), Čukarički (2021–2022, 2022–2023)
- Esmir Ahmetović – Jagodina (2011–2012)
- Zoran Amidžić – Hajduk Kula (1996–1998), Proleter Zrenjanin (1999–2000)
- Mile Andrić – Sloboda Užice (1991–1994, 2001–2002)
- Luka Asentić – Bačka Bačka Palanka (2018–2019)
- Miloš Babić – Obilić (2000–2004)
- Delimir Bajić – Sloboda Užice (2012–2013), Rad Beograd (2014–2015)
- Miloš Bajić – OFK Beograd (2011)–2012), Napredak Kruševac (2011–2015), Mladost Lučani (2015–2016), Bačka Bačka Palanka (2017–2018)
- **Branimir Bajić** – Partizan (2000–2007)
- **Samed Baždar** – Partizan (2020–2024)
- **Muhamed Bešić** – **Spartak Subotica** (2024–present)
- Haris Bešlija – Borac Čačak (2010–2011)
- Edin Biber – Radnik Surdulica (2020–2022)
- Milorad Bilbija – OFK Kikinda (1993–1994)
- **Nemanja Bilbija** – Vojvodina (2009–2013)
- Sergej Bjelica - Voždovac (2022-2025)
- Nikola Bjeloš – Zlatibor Čajetina (2020–2021)
- Ognjen Blagojević – BSK Borča (2011–2012)
- Slaviša Bogdanović – Rad Beograd (2011–2012), Spartak Subotica (2012–2013)
- Jadranko Bogičević – Red Star (2003–2005)
- Andrej Bosnić – Čukarički (2020–2021)
- Filip Božić – Mačva Šabac (2017–2021)
- Igor Božić – Rad Beograd (2005–2009)
- **Mario Božić** – Milicionar Beograd (2003–2004), Voždovac (2013–2014), Borac Čačak (2014–2015)
- Bakir Brajlović – Novi Pazar (2023–2024, 2024–2025)
- **Aleksandar Bratić** – Hajduk Kula (1992–1993), Rad Beograd (1993–1996), Red Star (1996–1997), OFK Beograd (1997–1999, 2006–2007)
- Aleksandar Brđanin – OFK Beograd (2001–2002)
- Esad Brkić – Spartak Subotica (1997–1999)
- Dženan Bureković – Vojvodina (2016–2018), Spartak Subotica (2022–2023)
- Davor Cavrić – Banat Zrenjanin (2007–2012, 2013–2014), Hajduk Kula (2012–2013)
- Borisav Cicović – OFK Beograd (2011–2012)
- Zoran Čampara – Rad Beograd (1992–1995)
- Novica Čomić – Mladost Apatin (2001–2005)
- Muhidin Čoralić – Zemun (1990–1993)
- Miroslav Čovilo – Inđija (2010–2011), Spartak Subotica (2010–2011), Hajduk Kula (2011–2012)
- Marko Čubrilo – Radnik Surdulica (2017–2019)
- Nebojša Ćorović – Spartak Subotica (1997–1999)
- Đorđe Ćosić - Mladost GAT (2022–2023)
- **Mehmed Ćosić** - Kolubara Lazarevac (2022–2023), **Radnički Kragujevac** (2023–present)
- Semir Dacić – Novi Pazar (2020–2021)
- Nikola Damjanac – Partizan (1991–1993, 1994–1997, 1998–2000), OFK Beograd (1993–1994, 2001–2002, 2003–2005)
- **Dario Damjanović** – Novi Pazar (2012)–2013), Jagodina (2012–2014), OFK Beograd (2015–2016)
- Goran Dasović – Vojvodina (1995–1996)
- Darko Dejanović – Rad Beograd (2014–2018)
- Nikša Dimitrijević – Zvezdara (2001–2002)
- Srđan Dobrić – BSK Borča (2010–2011)
- Dalibor Dragić – Vojvodina (1999–2000), Mladost Apatin (2006–(2007)
- Goran Dragović – Radnički Beograd (2001–2002), Voždovac (2002–2008, 2013–2014), Javor Ivanjica (2008–2011)
- Nemanja Dragutinović – Novi Pazar (2020–2021), Radnički Kragujevac (2021–2022)
- Nenad Drljača – Vojvodina (1991–1993)
- Feđa Dudić – Novi Pazar (2011–2012)
- Filip Dujmović – Spartak Subotica (2019–2021), Radnički Niš (2021-2022)
- **Amer Dupovac** – Borac Čačak (2017–2018)
- Darko Đajić – Vojvodina (2009–2010)
- **Ifet Đakovac** – Zlatibor Čajetina (2019–2021), TSC Bačka Topola (2021–2025)
- Ognjen Đelmić – Rad Beograd (2006–2009), Vojvodina (2017–2018)
- Boban Đerić – Javor Ivanjica (2017–2020)
- Uroš Đerić – Radnički Niš (2013)–2014), Borac Čačak (2013–2015), Mladost Lučani (2015–2016), Napredak Kruševac (2017–2018)
- Željko Đokić – Javor Ivanjica (2007–2009, 2009–2011), Novi Pazar (2014–2015)
- Goran Đukić – Hajduk Kula (1993–1998), Milicionar Beograd (1998–2001), Red Star (2001–2002)
- Aleksa Đurasović – Spartak Subotica (2023–2024), Jedinstvo Ub (2024–2025)
- Saša Đuričić – Hajduk Kula (2000–2001)
- Siniša Đurić – Zemun (1996–2001)
- Predrag Erak – Zemun (2002–(2003)
- Nikola Eskić – Napredak Kruševac (2016–2020), Bačka Bačka Palanka (2020–2021)
- Vladimir Gaćinović – Bečej (1991–1997)
- Radovan Gajić – Proleter Zrenjanin (199_–199_), Obilić (1997–1998)
- Aleksandar Galić – Vojvodina (2002–2003)
- Mladen Galić – Bačka Bačka Palanka (2015–2017), TSC Bačka Topola (2017–2020), Proleter Novi Sad (2020–2021)
- Miloš Galin – Rad Beograd (2008–2009)
- Sahmir Garčević – Obilić (1997–1998)
- Dragan Glogovac – Rad Beograd (1992–1995), Sartid Smederevo (1999–2002)
- Stevo Glogovac – Zvezdara (1995–1997), Rad Beograd (1997–1999), Red Star (1999–2002), Zemun (2003–2006), FK Bežanija (2006–2007)
- Ognjen Gnjatić – Rad Beograd (2012–2015)
- Aleksej Golijanin – Novi Pazar (2023–2024), Radnički Kragujevac (2024–2025)
- Miljan Govedarica – Donji Srem (2013–2014)
- Branko Grahovac – Borac Čačak (2007–2010)
- **Daniel Graovac** – Vojvodina (2018–2019)
- Nikola Grujić – **Spartak Subotica** (2025–present)
- **Vladan Grujić** – Obilić (1999–2000), Red Star (2001–2002), Voźdovac (2015–2016)
- Nebojša Gudelj – Partizan (1991–1994)
- **Irfan Hadžić** – Tekstilac Odžaci (2024–2025), **Mladost Lučani** (2025–present)
- Elmin Hadžikadunić – Radnički Niš (2016–2017)
- Ismar Hairlahović – Zlatibor Čajetina (2020–2021)
- Haris Hajdarević – **Radnik Surdulica** (2023–present)
- Faris Handžić – Novi Pazar (2021–2022)
- Mersad Hankić – Čukarički Stankom (2004–(2005)
- **Nermin Haskić** – Radnički Niš (2018–2020)
- Dušan Hodžić - Radnik Surdulica (2021–2023)
- Ante Hrkać – Mladost Lučani (2021–2022)
- **Faruk Hujdurović** – OFK Beograd (1993–1994), Hajduk Kula (1995–1996)
- Jovan Ilić – Proleter Novi Sad (2019–2022), **Radnički Kragujevac** (2024–present)
- Đorđe Inđić – Zemun (1996–2001)
- Bojan Jamina – OFK Beograd (2000–2001)
- Nemanja Janičić – Napredak Kruševac (2011–2015), Borac Čačak (2016–2017)
- **Petar Jelić** – OFK Beograd (2007–2010), Novi Pazar (2013–2014), Rad Beograd (2014–2015)
- Peđa Jerinić – Smederevo (2010–2012), Hajduk Kula (2012–2013)
- Ognjen Jevtić – Obilić (____–2003)
- Igor Joksimović – Zemun (2006–2008)
- Mladen Jovančić – Železnik (2000–2002, 2004–2005)
- Vladimir Jovančić – Rad Beograd (2007–2011), Partizan (2011)–2012), Jagodina (2014–2015)
- Aleksandar Jovanović – OFK Beograd (2005–2007), Hajduk Kula (2007–2011)
- Miodrag Jovanović – BSK Borča (2011–2012)
- Petar Jovanović – Sloboda Užice (2009–2011, 2022–2023), Radnički Niš (2013–2014), Voždovac (2015)–2016), Rad Beograd (2015–2016), Čukarički (2016–2017), Mladost Lučani (2017–2019, 2019–2021)
- Aleksandar Kahvić – Železničar Pančevo (2023–2024), OFK Beograd (2024–2025)
- **Đorđe Kamber** – OFK Beograd (2002–2006)
- Dragan Kavaz – Napredak Kruševac (1990–1993)
- **Dušan Kerkez** – Radnički Obrenovac (2000–2002)
- Nenad Kiso – Čukarički Stankom (2007–2011, 2018–2019), Zemun (2017–2018, 2019–2020)
- Obren Kljajić – Voždovac (2022–2023)
- Arsen Knežević – Rad Beograd (2018–2019)
- Igor Kojić – Bežanija (2006–2007), Smederevo (2009–2010, 2012–2013)
- Jovo Kojić – Novi Pazar (2020–2022)
- Saša Kolunija – Bežanija (2005–2007, (2008)–2009, 2014–2015), Rad Beograd (2013–2014)
- Nikola Kosanić – Mačva Šabac (2018–2019)
- **Aleksandar Kosorić** – Partizan (2008–2009), Rad Beograd (2009–2011), Radnički Kragujevac (2011–2013), Radnički Niš (2013–2014)
- Stefan Kovač – Čukarički (2018–2024), Partizan (2024–2025)
- Goran Kovačević – Zemun (1992–1994)
- Gojko Kozić – Mladost Apatin (2001–2002)
- Damjan Krajišnik – Mladost Lučani (2019–2020), Metalac G.M. (2020–2022), Radnički Kragujevac (2022-2023), Železničar Pančevo (2023–2024)
- **Rade Krunić** – Donji Srem (2012–2014), Borac Čačak (2014–2015), **Red Star** (2024–present)
- Simo Krunić – OFK Beograd (1992–1994), Čukarički Stankom (1996–1997)
- Esad Kuhinja – Napredak Kruševac (1990–1994)
- Luka Kukić - Novi Pazar (2021-2022)
- Miloš Kuljanin – Borac Čačak (2008–2009)
- Petar Kunić – Novi Pazar (2016–2017), Napredak Kruševac (2021–2022), Radnik Surdulica (2022-2024)
- Đorđe Kunovac – Bečej (1994–1995), Rad Beograd (1995–1998, 2001–2002)
- **Numan Kurdić** – Novi Pazar (2020–2021, 2022–2023, 2024–2025)
- Nenad Kutlačić – Budućnost Banatski Dvor (2003–2004), Banat Zrenjanin (2005–2007)
- Mićo Kuzmanović – Jagodina (2014–2015)
- Nikola Lakić – Dinamo Vranje (2018–2019)
- Miodrag Latinović – Loznica (199_–199_), Spartak Subotica (199_–1999)
- Milivoje Lazić – Zemun (2018–2019)
- Nemanja Lekanić – Sloboda Užice (2013–2014), Mačva Šabac (2015–2018)
- Bojan Letić – Radnički Niš (2019–2020)
- Marinko Mačkić – Mladost Lučani (2000–2003), Vojvodina (2003)–2004)
- Bojan Magazin – Vojvodina (1998–1999)
- Nemanja Majkić – **Jedinstvo Ub** (2024–present)
- Zoran Majstorović – Borac Čačak (1994–1996), Železnik (1997–2004)
- Dejan Maksimović – Zemun (2018–2019)
- Ajdin Maksumić – Sloboda Užice (2012–2013)
- **Darko Maletić** – Partizan (2006–2008)
- Marko Maletić – Zlatibor Čajetina (2020–2021), Javor Ivanjica (2022–2023)
- Luka Malić - Radnički Kragujevac (2022–2023)
- Strahinja Manojlović - Mačva Šabac (2021-2022), Javor Ivanjica (2022-2024), **Radnički Niš** (2024–present)
- Damjan Marčeta – Donji Srem (2012–2015)
- Slavko Marić – Hajduk Beograd (2001–2006), Mladost Lučani (2006–2008, 2017–2018), Borac Čačak (2008–2011), Sloboda Užice (2011–2012), Radnički Kragujevac (2012–2014), Jagodina (2015–2016), Novi Pazar (2016–2017), Mačva Šabac (2018–2020)
- Darije Markočević – **Radnik Surdulica** (2025–present)
- Neven Marković – Rad Beograd (2005–2007), Mladost Lučani (2007–2008)
- Vlado Marković – OFK Beograd (2007–2008)
- Njegoš Matić – Mladost Apatin (2001–2002)
- Dragan Matković – Vojvodina (2017–2020)
- Darjan Matović – Javor Ivanjica (2013–2014)
- Darko Mavrak – Proleter Zrenjanin (1992–1993)
- Marko Mazalica – Rad Beograd (2005–2007), Donji Srem (2014–2015)
- Slobodan Mazić – Spartak Subotica (1999–2001, 2006–2007), OFK Beograd (2001–2002)
- Miodrag Medan – Rad Beograd (1993–1994)
- Miroslav Medan – Sloboda Užice (1995–1996)
- Eldar Mehmedović – **Spartak Subotica** (2025–present)
- Dragan Mićić – Red Star (1996–2000), Rad Beograd (2000–2002), Banat Zrenjanin (2002–2007)
- Marko Mik – Mladost Lučani (2001–2002)
- Borislav Mikić – Borac Čačak (1999–2000), Železnik (2002–2006), Voždovac (2006)–2007), Banat Zrenjanin (2006–2009)
- **Ninoslav Milenković** – Mladost Lučani (1996–1998), Hajduk Kula (2001–(2002)
- Zoran Milidrag – Spartak Subotica (1993–1995), Sartid Smederevo (199_–1998)
- Nikola Milinković – Bečej (1991–1993)
- Nenad Miljković – Vojvodina (1994–1995, 1996–1997, 1998–1999), Spartak Subotica (1997–1998), Red Star (1999–2001), Sartid Smederevo (2001–200_)
- **Milenko Milošević** – Loznica (1996–1998), Red Star (1998–2000)
- Miroslav Milutinović – Vojvodina (2006–2010), Hajduk Kula (2012–2013)
- Zoran Milutinović – Voždovac (2017–2018)
- Igor Mišan – OFK Beograd (2007–2010), Spartak Subotica (2010–2011), Radnik Surdulica (2016–2017)
- Jovo Mišeljić – Radnički Niš (1992–1995, 2001–2003)
- **Nenad Mišković** – Radnički Beograd (1993–1997), Proleter Zrenjanin (1998–1999), Partizan (1999–2004), Rad Beograd (2005–(2006), Mladost Apatin (2006–2007), Banat Zrenjanin (2007–2008)
- Slaviša Mitrović – Bečej (1994–1996)
- Marko Mitrušić – Metalac G.M. (2011–2012)
- Siniša Mladenović – Radnik Surdulica (2016–2018), Zemun (2018–2019)
- Aleksa Mrđa – Voždovac (2017–2018)
- Marko Mrgud – OFK Beograd (2013–2014)
- Momčilo Mrkaić – Zemun (2011–2013, 2018–2019), Javor Ivanjica (2017–2018, (2019)–2020), Vojvodina (2019–2022)
- Dragan Mučibabić – Rad Beograd (1992–1993)
- **Nihad Mujakić** – Partizan (2024–2025)
- Mustafa Mujezinović - Novi Pazar (2021–2023)
- **Denis Mujkić** – Novi Pazar (2012–2013)
- **Siniša Mulina** – Bečej (1993–1996), Partizan (1996–1997), Milicionar Beograd (1997–2001), Vojvodina (2000–(2001)
- **Bojan Nastić** – Vojvodina (2011–2016)
- Nenad Nikić - Voždovac (2022–2023)
- Nemanja Nikolić – Radnički Niš (2019–2020)
- **Staniša Nikolić** – Vojvodina (2004–2005)
- **Stevo Nikolić** – Obilić (2002–2005)
- Vladimir Nosović – Hajduk Kula (2002–2003)
- Nenad Novaković – Borac Čačak (2007–2009)
- Slobo Novaković – Vojvodina (1997–1998)
- Amer Osmanagić – OFK Beograd (2008–2009, 2011–2012), Novi Pazar (2015–2016)
- Branko Ostojić – Javor Ivanjica (2010–2013), Voždovac (2018–2019)
- Ljubiša Pecelj – Kolubara Lazarevac (2019–2020,2021–2022), Metalac G.M. (2020–2021), Radnički Kragujevac (2022–2024)
- Milan Pecelj – Radnički Niš (1998–2000), Hajduk Kula (2000–2002)
- **Srđan Pecelj** – Red Star (1992–1993, 1995–1996, 1997–1999), Čukarički Stankom (1996–1997, 1999–2000)
- **Nebojša Pejić** – BSK Borča (2006–2011)
- Bojan Petrić – Novi Pazar (2011)–2012)
- Ognjen Petrović – Javor Ivanjica (2012–2013)
- Todor Petrović – **Voždovac** (2014–2019, 2024–present), Radnički Niš (2020–2022), Javor Ivanjica (2023–2024)
- Zvonimir Petrović – Javor Ivanjica (2023–2024)
- Siniša Peulić – Hajduk Kula (199_–1995)
- Miloš Pojić – Hajduk Kula (199_–1998)
- Željko Polak – Milicionar Beograd (1998–1999), Radnički Beograd (1999–2000, 2001–2004), Bežanija (2004–2006, 2006–2008)
- Dajan Ponjević - Bačka Bačka Palanka (2014-2021), Radnički Kragujevac (2022–2023)
- Nikola Popara – Spartak Subotica (2012–2013), Vojvodina (2013–2014), Jagodina (2014–2015)
- Mirza Prguda – Novi Pazar (2023–2024)
- **Ilija Prodanović** – Bečej (1996–1997)
- **Dario Purić** – OFK Beograd (2007–2008), Sloboda Užice (2012–2014)
- Hakim Puteš – Bečej (1997–1999)
- Bojan Puzigaća – Voždovac (2015–2017)
- Darko Raca – Zemun (1997–1998)
- Saša Raca – Mladost Apatin (1996–1998), Zemun (1998–2000, 2001–2002)
- Čedomir Radić – Metalac G.M. (2016–2017)
- Samir Radovac - Novi Pazar (2022–2023)
- Slaviša Radović – Vojvodina (2014–2016), Voždovac (2016–2017), Radnički Kragujevac (2024–2025)
- Radoslav Radulović – Zemun (1995–1998, 2000–2002), Rad Beograd (2001–(2002)
- **Amar Rahmanović** – Novi Pazar (2012–2013)
- Dragan Rajović – Obilić (199_–____), OFK Beograd (____–2003)
- Zoran Rajović – Vojvodina (1996–1999, 2000–2002), Hajduk Kula (2008–2009)
- Sead Ramović – Novi Pazar (2011)–2012)
- **Admir Raščić** – Novi Pazar (2011–2013)
- Haris Redžepi – Novi Pazar (2012–2014)
- Igor Remetić – Proleter Zrenjanin (199_–____), Zemun (____–2002)
- Ševkija Resić – Novi Pazar (2020–2021)
- Ilija Ristanić – Napredak Kruševac (2009–2010)
- Predrag Ristanović - Novi Pazar (2022–2023)
- Dušan Ristić – **Javor Ivanjica** (2025–present)
- Ivan Ristić – Vojvodina (1997–2001), Rad Beograd (2001–2002)
- Edin Rustemović – OFK Beograd (2012–2013), Radnik Surdulica (2022–2023, 2023–2024)
- Branislav Ružić – Mladost Lučani (2016–2017)
- **Damir Sadiković** - Kolubara Lazarevac (2022–2023), Napredak Kruševac (2023–2025)
- **Duško Sakan** – Rad Beograd (2011–(2012)
- **Siniša Saničanin** – Mladost Lučani (2015–2017), Vojvodina (2017-2021), Partizan (2021–2024)
- Stefan Santrač – TSC Bačka Topola (2020–2022)
- Boris Savić – Rad Beograd (2009–2010)
- Milan Savić – Čukarički (2019–2022), Mladost GAT (2022–2023)
- Miljan Sekulović – Vojvodina (1991–1992), Borac Čačak (1995–2000)
- Semir Smajlagić – Radnički Niš (2023–2024)
- Armin Smajić – OFK Kikinda (1987–1988, 1992–1993)
- Milan Srećo – Partizan (2004–2005), Banat Zrenjanin (2008–2010)
- Filip Sredojević – OFK Beograd (2014–2015)
- Duško Stajić – Sloboda Užice (2012–2013)
- Milorad Stajić – Radnički Niš (2023–2025)
- Milan Stanivuković – Bečej (1996–1999)
- Miroslav Stefanović – Rad Beograd (1990–1991), Zemun (1991–1992), Čukarički (1992–1993)
- **Miroslav Stevanović** – Vojvodina (2010–2013)
- Saša Stević – Borac Čačak (2001–2006), Banat Zrenjanin (2008–2010)
- Nikola Stijaković – BSK Borča (2009–2011), Spartak Subotica (2011–2013)
- Stefan Stojanović – IMT Beograd (2022–2023), Tekstilac Odžaci (2023–2025), **Spartak Subotica** (2025–present)
- Jovica Stokić – BSK Borča (2011–2012)
- Nenad Studen – Partizan (1999–2000)
- Boško Stupić – Novi Pazar (2015)–2016)
- Aleksandar Subić – Partizan (2015–2016, 2018–2019), Radnički Niš (2017–2018)
- **Nemanja Supić** – Železnik (2002–2004), Zemun (2005–2007), Javor Ivanjica (2008–2009, 2010–2011), Vojvodina (2011–2013), Novi Pazar (2013)–2014), Voždovac (2013–2015), Red Star (2015–2019)
- Zoran Šaraba – Vojvodina (1990–1997), Budućnost Valjevo (1997–1998)
- Budimir Šarčević – Čukarički (2014–2016)
- Miloš Šatara – Mladost Lučani (2015–2021)
- Stefan Šavija – **Tekstilac Odžaci** (2023–present)
- **Besim Šerbečić** – Radnički Kragujevac (2023–2025)
- Ognjen Škorić – Donji Srem (2012–2013)
- Nebojša Šodić – Hajduk Kula (2006–2008)
- Neđo Šuka – Donji Srem (2013–2014)
- Zoran Šupić – OFK Beograd (2002–2007), Bežanija (2006)–2007), Novi Pazar (2011)–2012), BSK Borča (2011–2012, 2013–2015)
- Marko Šušnjar - TSC Bačka Topola (2021–2022, 2022–2023), **Tekstilac Odžaci** (2024–present)
- Bojan Tadić – OFK Beograd (2000–2002)
- Izzy Tandir – Javor Ivanjica (2016–2017)
- Dobrica Tegeltija – Vojvodina (2016–2019)
- **Amir Teljigović** – Proleter Zrenjanin (1986–1992, 2000–2002), Vojvodina (1992–1994)
- Danilo Teodorović - Voždovac (2022–2024)
- Borislav Terzić – Donji Srem (2012–2013), Sloboda Užice (2013–2014), Radnički Kragujevac (2014–2015), Voždovac (2015–2016), Javor Ivanjica (2016–2018), Zemun (2018–2019)
- Pero Tešić – Bačka Bačka Palanka (2018–2019)
- Mirko Todorović – Proleter Zrenjanin (199_–199_), Hajduk Beograd (1999–2000)
- Kristijan Tojčić - Mačva Šabac (2021-2022), Javor Ivanjica (2022–2024), **Železničar Pančevo** (2025–present)
- Jovica Toljagić – Čukarički Stankom (2001–2003)
- Borislav Topić – BSK Borča (2006–2010), Novi Pazar (2012–2013)
- Anid Travančić – Novi Pazar (2016)–2017), Radnički Niš (2016–2018)
- Filip Trivan – Priština (1997–1999)
- **Vule Trivunović** – Obilić (1999–2002, 2003–2004)
- Bojan Trkulja – Obilić (200_–2002)
- Stefan Udovičić – Čukarički Stankom (2010–2011), Radnički Kragujevac (2011–2012)
- Nikola Valentić – OFK Beograd (2000–2002), Jagodina (2012–2013), Radnički Niš (2014–2015)
- Dragan Vasić – Sartid Smederevo (1997–1998)
- Strahinja Vasilić – **Spartak Subotica** (2025–present)
- Aleksandar Vasiljević – Bežanija (2005–2008), Mladi Radnik (2008–2010), Jagodina (2010–2012), Hajduk Kula (2011–(2012), Novi Pazar (2012–2013), Donji Srem (2013)–2014), Voždovac (2013–(2014), Napredak Kruševac (2014)–2015)
- Dražen Vasiljević – Borac Čačak (2004–2005)
- **Nikola Vasiljević** – BSK Borča (2010–2011), Voždovac (2013–2014)
- Zoran Vasiljević – Sloboda Užice (1992–1995), Loznica (199_–199_)
- Predrag Videkanić – Hajduk Kula (2005–2006)
- Aleksandar Vidović – Spartak Subotica (2019–2023)
- Saša Vidović – Zemun (2003–2007, 2010–2011), Rad Beograd (2007–2010)
- Predrag Vladić – Zlatibor Čajetina (2020–2021)
- **Aleksandar Vojnović** – Radnički Niš (2023–2025)
- Darko Vojvodić – Loznica (1994–1995), Radnički Kragujevac (1995–1998), Sartid Smederevo (1998–2000), Milicionar Beograd (2000–2001)
- Milorad Vranješ – Sloboda Užice (1994–1996)
- **Ognjen Vranješ** – Red Star (2008–2009), Napredak Kruševac (2009–2010), Čukarički (2023–2024)
- **Stojan Vranješ** – Vojvodina (2012–2014)
- Aleksandar Vrhovac – Spartak Subotica (1995–1998)
- Jovan Vujanić – Sloboda Užice (2011)–2012)
- Igor Vujanović – Borac Čačak (1995–1998), Obilić (1999)–2000), Železnik (2000–2001)
- Slavko Vujić – Rad Beograd (1997–2001)
- Filip Vujović – Rad Beograd (2015–2016)
- Dragan Vukajlović – Zemun (2001–2002)
- Svetozar Vukašinović – Proleter Zrenjanin (1999–2000)
- Milenko Vukčević – Spartak Subotica (1992–1993)
- Goran Vukliš – Vojvodina (2020–2022), Radnik Surdulica (2022–2023), IMT Beograd (2023–2025)
- Dejan Vukomanović – BSK Borča (2011–2012, 2019–2020)
- Aleksandar Vuković – Partizan (1999–2000), Milicionar Beograd (2000–2001)
- Dženan Zajmović – Radnik Surdulica (2023–2024)
- **Goran Zakarić** – Partizan (2018–2019)
- Samir Zeljković – Radnički Kragujevac (2024–2025)
- **Almedin Ziljkić** – Donji Srem (2014–2015), Novi Pazar (2015–2016, 2024–2025))
- Damir Zlomislić – Vojvodina (2018–2019)
- Irfan Zulfić – Tekstilac Odžaci (2024–2025), **IMT Beograd** (2025–present)
- Milija Žižić – Javor Ivanjica (2002–2003)
- Marko Žulj - Spartak Subotica (2021-2022)

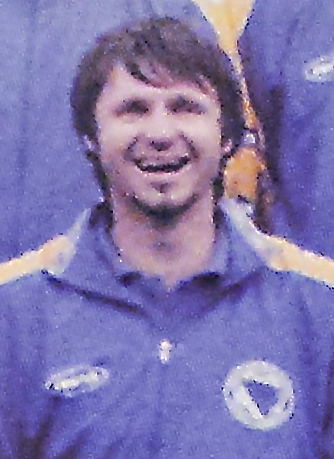
Bolić played with Red Star before becoming Fenerbahçe idol.

Bosnian internationals that played in Serbian top league clubs only during Yugoslav period:

- **Elvir Bolić** – Red Star (1991–1992)
- **Husref Musemić** – Red Star (1985–1989)
- **Fahrudin Omerović** – Partizan (1984–1992)
- **Admir Smajić** – Partizan (1979–1988)
- **Nermin Šabić** – Red Star (1991–1992)

== Brazil ==
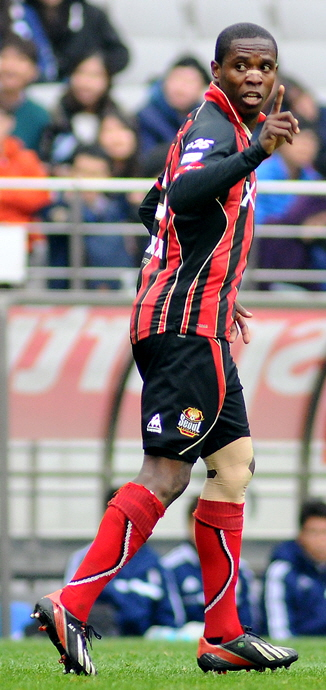
Adilson, made impact in Red Star in late 1990s.

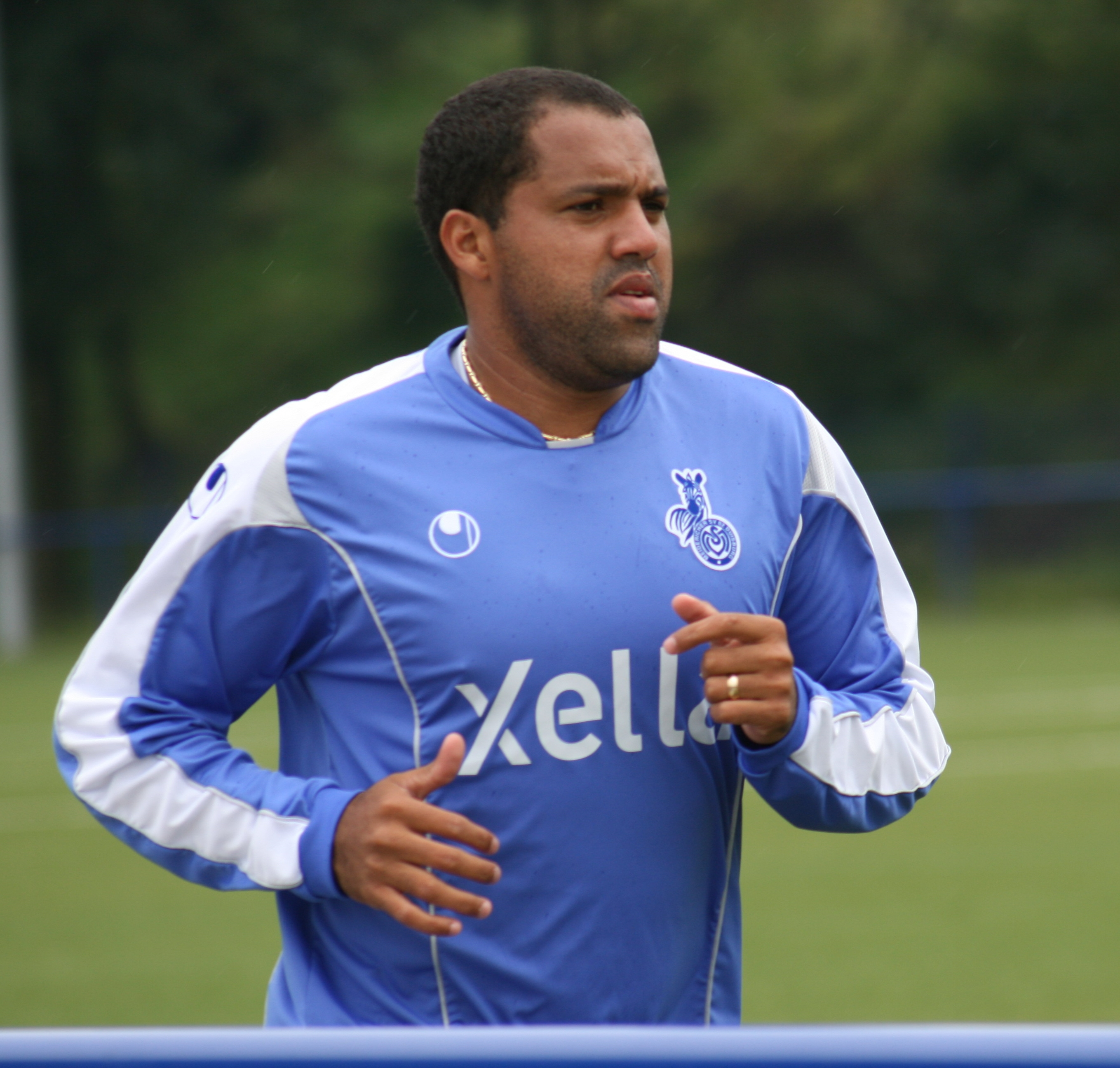
Aílton, former Bundesliga topscorer and footballer of the year in 2004, joined Red Star in 2006.

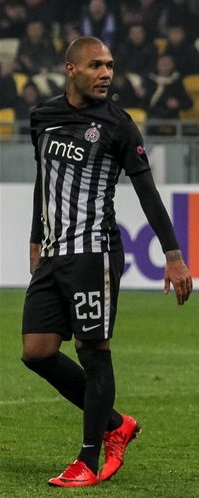
Everton Luiz, Partizan.

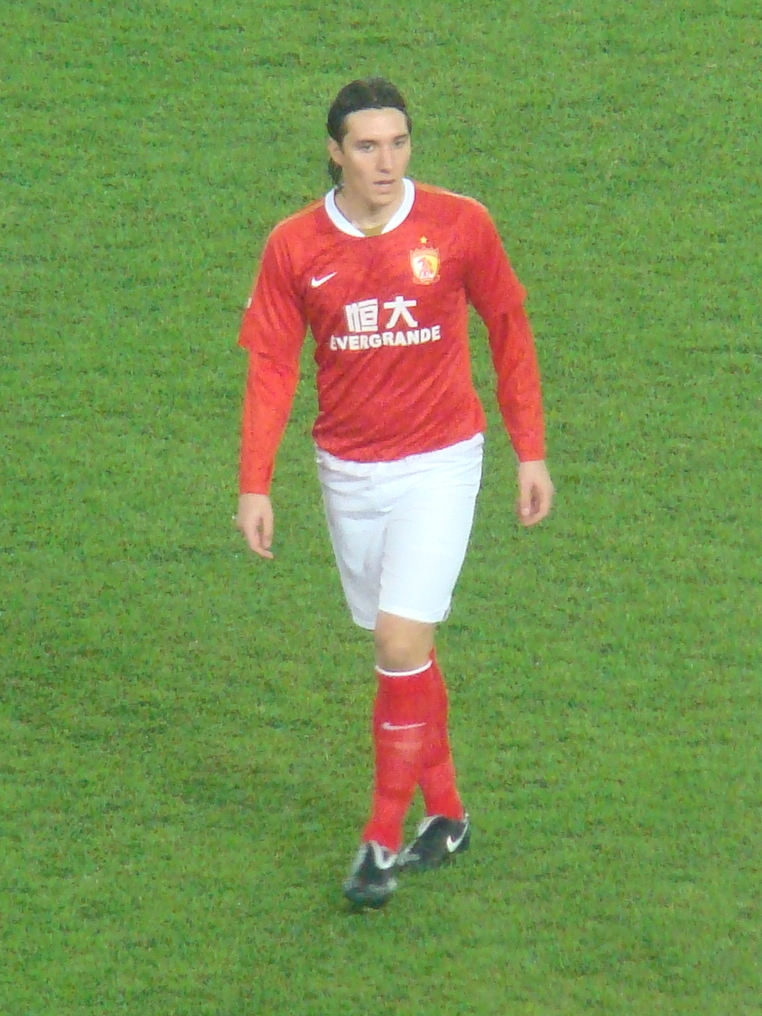
Cléo, the first foreigner that played for both rivals, Red Star and Partizan.

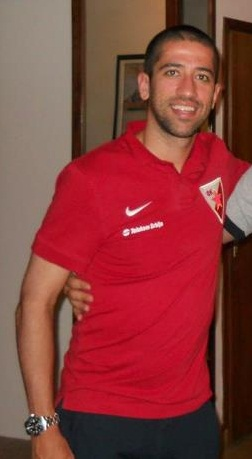
Evandro, former Brazilian youth international, Red Star.

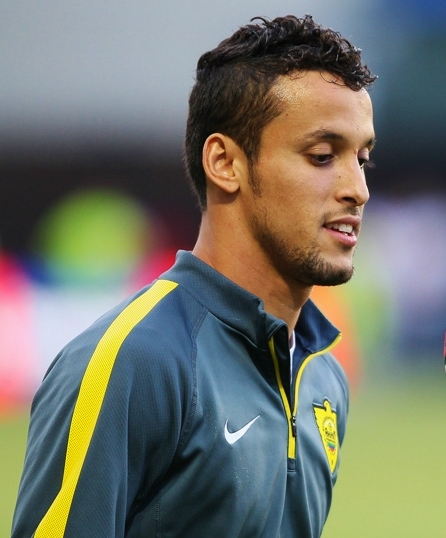
Leonardo, Partizan, 2016/17 league topscorer with 24 goals along teammate Đurđević.

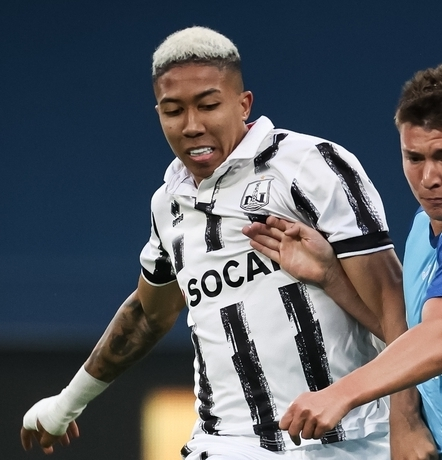
Saldanha, Partizan, 2023/24 league topscorer with 16 goals along Luković.

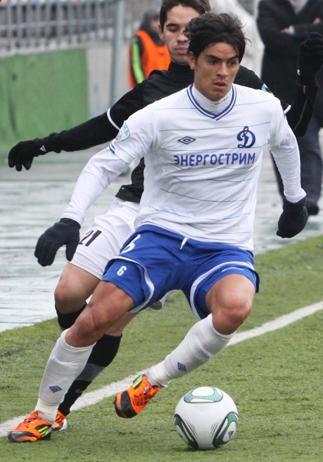
William, OFK Beograd.

- Adilson (Adilson dos Santos) – Red Star (1997–1998)
- Adriano Strack (Adriano Guerra Strack) – Novi Pazar (2015–2016)
- Aílton (Aílton Gonçalves da Silva) – Red Star (2006–2007)
- Anderson Costa (Anderson José de Jesús Costa) – Rad Beograd (2002–2003)
- Anderson Marques (Anderson Marques de Oliveira) – Partizan (2011–2012)
- Andrezinho (André Reinaldo de Souza Esposito) – Borac Čačak (2009–2010)
- Lucas Barros (Lucas Barros da Cunha) – **Vojvodina** (2024–present)
- Diogo Bezerra (Diogo de Bezerra de Oliveira) – OFK Beograd (2024–2026)
- Bruno Matos (Bruno Oliveira de Matos) – Novi Pazar (2014–2015, 2015–(2016), Red Star (2015)–2016)
- Cadú (Carlos Eduardo de Fiori Mendes) – Red Star (2009–2013)
- Jefferson Café (Jefferson Luiz do Nascimento de Souza) – OFK Beograd (2010-2011)
- Jonathan Cafú (Jonathan Renato Barbosa) – Red Star (2018–2019)
- Caio (Caio Henrique Siqueira Sanchez) – Radnički Niš (2013–2014)
- Caju (Wánderson de Jesus Martins) – **Spartak Subotica** (2026–present)
- Cauê (Roberto Carvalho Cauê) – OFK Beograd (2009–2010)
- Cléo (Cleverson Gabriel Cordova) – Red Star (2008–2009), Partizan (2009–2011)
- Cristian (Cristian Daniel Dal Bello Fagundes) – Mladost GAT (2022–2023)
- Bruno Duarte (Bruno Duarte da Silva) – **Red Star** (2024–present)
- Edgar (Edgar Bruno da Silva) – Red Star (2008–2009)
- Edison (Edison Alves do Amaral) – Radnički Kragujevac (2001–2002)
- Edson Silva (Edson José da Silva) – Red Star (2015–2016)
- Eduardo (Eduardo Ferreira Abdo Pacheco) – Partizan (2011–2013)
- Eliomar (Eliomar Correia Silva) – Javor Ivanjica (2008–2012, 2015–2018,2021–2025), Partizan (2012–2013), Mladost Lučani (2019–2020), Inđija (2020)–2021), Zlatibor Čajetina (2020–2021)
- Ely Thadeu (Ely Thadeu Bravin Rangel) – Red Star (2006–2007), Bežanija (2007–2008)
- Emerson Brito (Emerson Rodrigues Brito) – Javor Ivanjica (2022–2023)
- Endelson (Endelson Posipon Edu) – Sartid Smederevo (1997–1998)
- Enzo Gonzaga (Enzo Oliveira Gonzaga) – **Spartak Subotica** (2026–present)
- Evandro (Evandro da Silva) – Proleter Novi Sad (2021–2022), **Radnički Kragujevac** (2022–2023, 2024–2025, 2026-present)
- Evandro Goebel – Red Star (2010–2012)
- Everton Luiz (Everton Luiz Guimarães Bilher) – Partizan (2015–2018)
- Ezequiel (Ezequiel Santos da Silva) – **Spartak Subotica** (2026–present)
- Fabinho Mauá (Fabio Moises Rosa) – OFK Beograd (2003–2004)
- Fábio Silva (Fabio Carleandro da Silva) – Rad Beograd (2002–2005, 2006–2007), Red Star (2005)–2006), Hajduk Kula (2005–(2006), Napredak Kruševac (2007–2008)
- Fabrício (Fabrício Silva Dornellas) – Partizan (2015–2016)
- Richard Falcão aka Rei (Richard Amorim Falcão) – Novi Pazar (2014–2015)
- Felipe Ferreira (Felipe de Figueiredo Ferreira) – Javor Ivanjica (2015–2016)
- Ferreira (Josiesley Ferreira Rosa) – Red Star (2008–2009)
- Fumaça (José Gomes Fumaça) – Red Star (1998–1999)
- Gefferson Goulart (Gefferson da Silva Goulart) – Železnik (2003–2005)
- Godoy (Rafael Godoy Pereira) – Banat Zrenjanin (2008–2009)
- Guiba (Guilherme Humberto da Silveira) – Red Star (1997–1998)
- Gustavo Vieira (Gustavo Vieira Francisco) – Jedinstvo Ub (2024–2025)
- Matheus Índio (Matheus Salgueiro Pains) – Vojvodina (2023–2024)
- Jander (Jander Ribeiro Santana) – Red Star (2019–2020)
- Jatobá (Carlos Roberto Jatobá) – Spartak Subotica (1990–1991)
- Jean Carioca (Jean da Silva Duarte) – OFK Beograd (2002–2003)
- Jeff Silva (Jefferson da Silva Nascimento) – Red Star (2008–2009)
- Jefferson Batista (Jefferson Alexandre Batista) – Vojvodina (2008–2009)
- João Paulo (João Paulo Santos de Oliveira Gomes) – Smederevo (2012–2013)
- Juca (Juliano Roberto Antonello) – Partizan (2007–2009)
- Rafael Juninho ( Rafael Batista da Silva Junior ) – **IMT** (2026–present)
- Kayque (Kayque Luis Pereira) – Spartak Subotica (2024–2025)
- Leandro Montebeler (Leandro Rodrigues Montebeler) – Vojvodina (2008–2009), Napredak Kruševac (2009–2010)
- Leandro Netto (Leandro Netto de Macedo) – OFK Beograd (2001–2004)
- Leandro Pinto (Leandro Climaco Pinto) – Proleter Novi Sad (2018–2021), TSC Bačka Topola (2021–2022), Radnik Surdulica (2022-2023), Javor Ivanjica (2023–2025)
- Léo Antônio (Léonardo Antônio) – **Spartak Subotica** (2024–present)
- Leonardo (Leonardo da Silva Souza) – Partizan (2016–2017)
- Lincoln (Lincoln Corrêa dos Santos) – **Spartak Subotica** (2025–present)
- Lucas (Lucas Marques da Silva) – Smederevo (2012–2013)
- Lucas Piasentin – Čukarički (2013–2017)
- Marcinho (Marcio Teruel) – Jagodina (2012–2013)
- Marcos (Marcos Fernando Souza Cilia) – OFK Beograd (2003–2004)
- Marquinhos (Marco Antonio Carmo Anjos) – Spartak Subotica (1990–1991)
- Mateus (Mateus Lima Cruz) – Borac Čačak (2017–2018)
- Matheus (Matheus Lima Magalhães) – **Red Star Belgrade** (2025–present)
- Vinicius Mello (Vinicius Silveira de Mello) – Čukarički (2023–2024)
- Bruno Mezenga (Bruno Ferreira Mombra Rosa) – Red Star (2011–2012)
- Osvaldo Monteiro – Spartak Subotica (1990–1991)
- Gabriel Neves (Gabriel Vinicius Neves) – BSK Borča (2012–2013)
- Vinícius Pacheco (Vinícius Pacheco dos Santos) – Red Star (2011–2012)
- Picon (Fernando Picon da Silva) – OFK Beograd (2002–2003)
- Marcelo Pletsch (Marcelo José Pletsch) – Vojvodina (2009–2010)
- Rafael Carioca (Rafael Felipe Barreto) – Banat Zrenjanin (2008–2010)
- Renan (Renan Oliveira do Vale) – Smederevo (2009–2010)
- Renan (Renan da Silva Alves) – Vojvodina (2017–2018)
- Ricardinho (Ricardo Silva de Almeida) – Sloboda Užice (2010–2011)
- Ricardinho (Ricardo Cavalcante Mendes) – Red Star (2017–2018)
- Richard (Richard dos Santos de Almeida) – Čukarički (2022–2023)
- Rivan (Rivanilton de França) – Rad Beograd (2001–2003), Hajduk Beograd (2002–(2003)
- Rodrigão (Rodrigo de Souza Prado) – **Red Star Belgrade** (2025–present)
- Ronaldo Viana (Ronaldo Aparecido Viana) – Železnik (2003–2005)
- Rudison (Rudison Nogueira Ferreira) – Borac Čačak (2001–2002), OFK Beograd (2002–2003)
- Matheus Saldanha (Matheus Bonifácio Saldanha Marinho) – Partizan (2023–2024)
- Pedro Sass Petrazzi – Borac Čačak (2015–2016)
- Sávio (Sávio Oliveira do Vale) – Red Star (2009–2012)
- Raúl Simplício – Sartid Smederevo (1997–1998)
- Tai (Taianan Imbere Linhares Welker) – Napredak Kruševac (2014–2015)
- Taigo (Taigo Vital Amorim de Araujo) – Dinamo Vranje (2018–2019)
- Tiago (Tiago Galvão da Silva) – Sloboda Užice (2010–2014), Čukarički (2015–2016), Borac Čačak (2016–2017)
- Tiago (Tiago Freitas da Gama Alves) – Banat Zrenjanin (2007–2008)
- Tom (Wellington Camargo do Nascimento) – Rad Beograd (2013–2014)
- Vítor Hugo (Vitor Hugo Manique de Jesus) – Partizan (2007–2008)
- Mateus Viveiros (Mateus Viveiros Andrade) – Red Star (2016–2017)
- Washington (Washington Roberto Mariano da Silva) – Partizan (2008–2010), Borac Čačak (2010–2011)
- William (William Artur de Oliveira) – OFK Beograd (2007–2009)
- William Alves (William Rocha Alves) – Borac Čačak (2008–2012)
- Willians (Willians Bartolomeu dos Santos) – Red Star (1998–1999)
- Zé Luis (José Luis Boscolo) – Sartid Smederevo (1997–1998)
- Zé Marcos (José Marcos Alves Luis) – Rad Beograd (2017–2018)

== Bulgaria ==
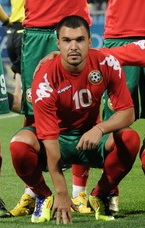
Former Juventus striker Valeri Bojinov signed with Partizan in summer 2015.

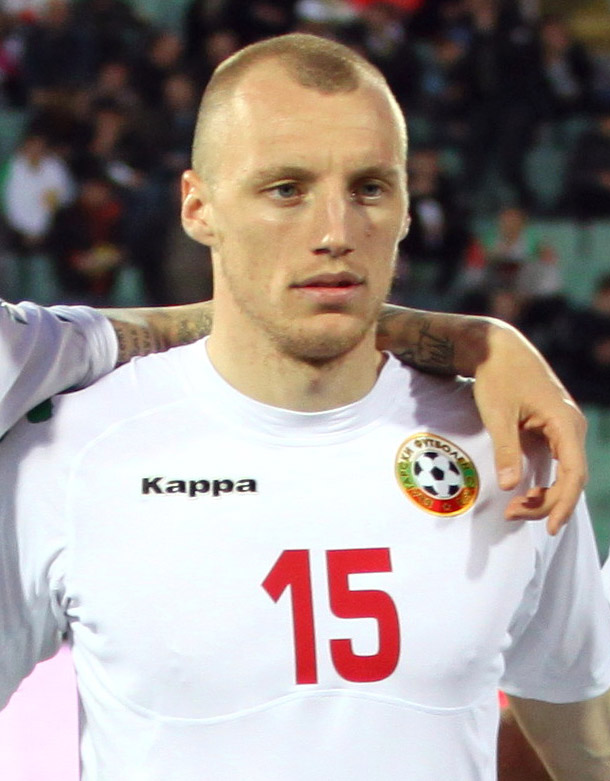
Ivan Ivanov, Bulgarian Footballer of the Year 2013, played with Partizan.

- **Todor Atanaskov** – Red Star (1946–1948) – ( (Socialist Federal Republic of Yugoslavia) when active)
- **Ivan Bandalovski** – Partizan (2014–2016)
- **Valeri Bojinov** – Partizan (2015–2017)
- Kostadin Gadzhalov – Borac Čačak (2010–2011)
- **Blagoy Georgiev** – Red Star (2006–2007)
- **Hristo Ivanov** - **Železničar Pančevo** (2025–present)
- **Ivan Ivanov** – Partizan (2011–2013)
- **Zoran Janković** – Železnik (1996–1998), Vojvodina (1998–2000), Inđija (2009–2011) – ( (Serbia and Montenegro) when active)
- Sylvester Jasper – **Železničar Pančevo** (2025–present)
- Veljko Jelenković – Vojvodina (2022–2023) – ( (Serbia) when active)
- **Yanis Karabelyov** - **Partizan** (2025–present)
- **Anton Kuzmanov** – Jedinstvo Beograd (1939–1941)
- Angel Manolov – Hajduk Kula (2009–2012)
- **Asen Nikolov** – Partizan (2006–2007)
- **Predrag Pažin** – Partizan (1994–1999) – ( (Serbia and Montenegro) when active)
- Radanov – Mitić Beograd (1942–1943)
- Petar Shopov – Železnik (2001–2004)
- **Blagoy Simeonov** – OFK Beograd (1946–1947) – ( (Socialist Federal Republic of Yugoslavia) when active)
- **Dragoljub Simonović** – Obilić (1997–1999) – ( (Serbia and Montenegro) when active)
- **Kiril Simonovski** – Partizan (1945–1950) – ( (Socialist Federal Republic of Yugoslavia) when active)
- Yanaki Smirnov – Metalac G.M. (2016–2017)
- **Metodi Tomanov** – Radnički Niš (1990–1992)
- Boris Tyutyukov – Radnički Niš (2024–2025)
- Iliyan Yordanov – Borac Čačak (2015–2016)
- Iliya Yurukov – Radnički Niš (2024–2025)

== Burkina Faso ==
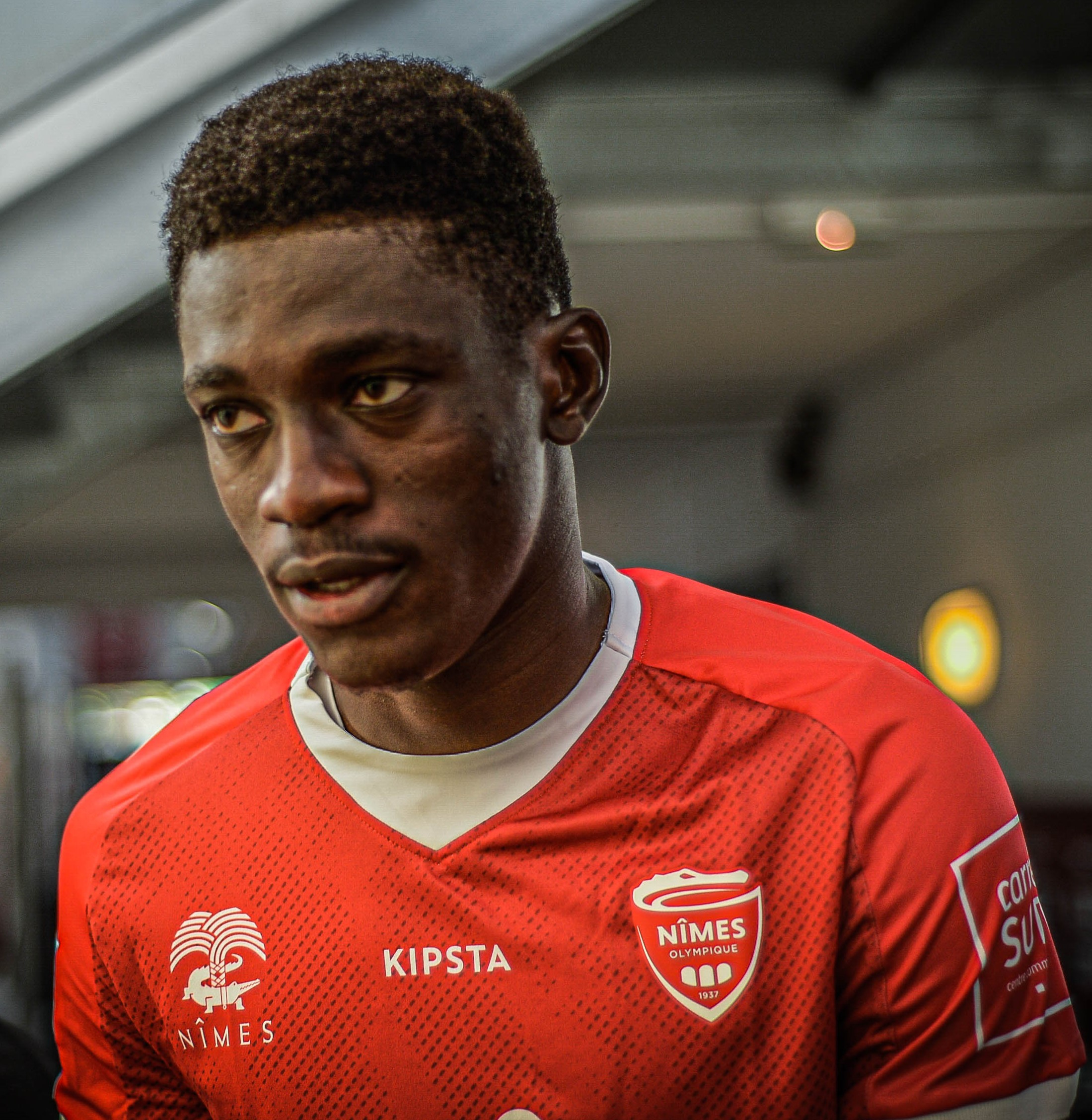
Nasser Djiga played for Red Star in the Champions League.

- Raouf Compaoré – Vojvodina (2016-2017)
- **Nasser Djiga** – Red Star (2023–2024)
- **Dramane Salou** – Partizan (2017–2018)

== Cameroon ==
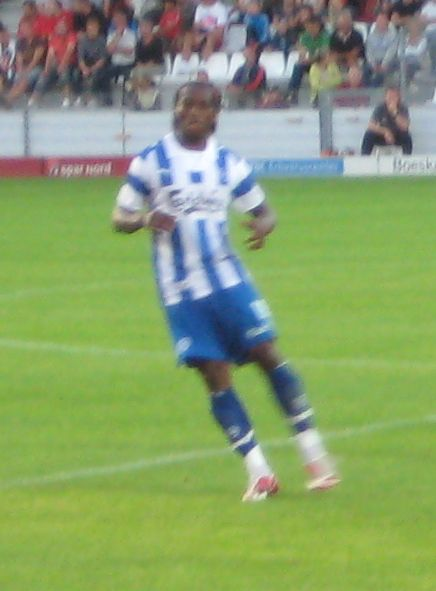
Djemba-Djemba, former Manchester United player, joined Partizan in summer 2013.

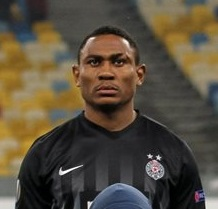
Tawamba debuted for Cameroon in 2018 while playing with Partizan

- Jean-Claude Amougou – OFK Beograd (2010-2011)
- **Macky Bagnack** – Partizan (2020–2021), TSC Bačka Topola (2024–2025)
- Regis Baha – Napredak Kruševac (2018–2020), Mladost Lučani (2020–2023)
- **Pierre Boya** – Partizan (2003–2007, 2010–2011)
- **Eric Djemba-Djemba** – Partizan (2013–2014)
- Thierry Ekwalla – Čukarički Stankom (2004–2005)
- Kufre Eta – **Vojvodina** (2025–present)
- Thierry Etoungou – Radnički Niš (2022–2025)
- **Collins Fai** – Radnički Niš (2023–2024)
- Fokim Fon Fondo – BSK Borča (2012–2013)
- Ferdinand Fru Fon – Dinamo Vranje (2018–2019)
- Patrick Kamgaing – Javor Ivanjica (2012–2013)
- Daniel Kamy – Inđija (2020–2021)
- Noé Kwin – Spartak Subotica (2012–2013)
- **John Mary** – **Vojvodina** (2014–2016, 2025–present), Novi Pazar (2024–2025)
- Bernard Mbassi – Rad Beograd (2002–2003)
- Donald Molls – Kolubara Lazarevac (2022–2023), Mladost Lučani (2023–2024)
- **Alexis N'Gambi** – Partizan (2008–2009)
- Jacques Nguemaleu – Napredak Kruševac (2009–2010)
- Idriss Nguessi – Novi Pazar (2012–2013)
- **Aboubakar Oumarou** – Red Star (2008–2009), OFK Beograd (2009–2010), Vojvodina (2010–2013), Partizan (2015–2016), Napredak Kruševac (2019–2021)
- **Kévin Soni** – Železničar Pančevo (2024–2025)
- Claude Rygan – Partizan (2003–2004)
- Jacques Ekangue Tabi – Hajduk Kula (2012–2013)
- **Léandre Tawamba** – Partizan (2016–2018)
- Didier Tayou – Sloboda Užice (2011–2013)
- Michel Vaillant Mbiobe – Napredak Kruševac (2014–2015), Mladost Lučani (2015–2018)
- **Ibrahim Walidjo** – Javor Ivanjica (2012–2015)
- **Basile Yamkam** – **Radnički Niš** (2021–present)

== Canada ==
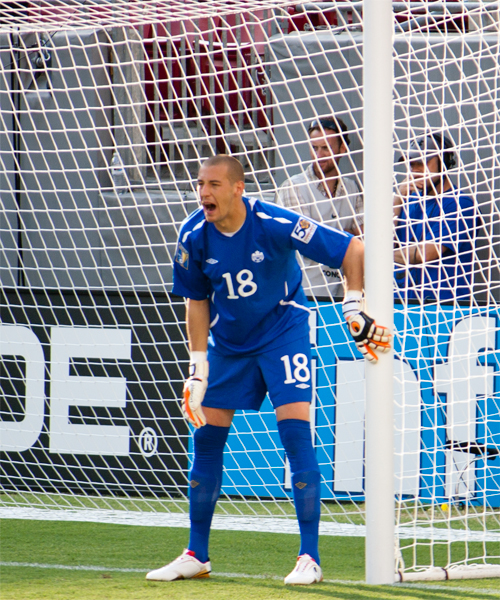
Milan Borjan, Canada national goalkeeper, spent much of his career in Serbia.

- **Milan Borjan** – Rad Beograd (2009–2011), Radnički Niš (2014–2015), Red Star (2017–2023)
- Milan Božić – Zvezdara (2001–2002, 2013–2015), Hajduk Beograd (2002–2005)
- Nikola Bursać – TSC Bačka Topola (2019–2022, 2023–2024), Spartak Subotica (2022–2023)
- **Stefan Cebara** – Rad Beograd (2009–2010), Vojvodina (2017–2018)
- **Derek Cornelius** – Javor Ivanjica (2016–2019)
- Srdjan Djekanović – Zemun (2001–2003), Radnički Obrenovac (2002–(2003)
- **Dejan Jakovic** – Red Star (2008–2009)
- Boban Kajgo – Smederevo (2009–2010)
- Jovan Lučić – Rad Beograd (2014–2015, 2021–2022)
- Aleksa Marković – Zemun (2015–2016, 2017–2018)
- Mario Ostojić – Milicionar Beograd (1998–1999), Red Star (2000–2001)
- Igor Prostran – Borac Čačak (2002–2004)
- **Mike Stojanovic** – Radnički Kragujevac (1969–1973) – ( (Socialist Federal Republic of Yugoslavia) when active)

== Cape Verde ==
- **Patrick Andrade** – Partizan (2022–2023)
- **Ricardo Gomes** – Partizan (2018–2019.2021–2023)

== Central African Republic ==
- **David Manga** – Partizan (2011–2012)

== Chad ==
- **Misdongarde Betolngar** – Red Star (2007–2008), Metalac G.M. (2009–2012)

== Chile ==
- Mario Berrios – OFK Beograd (2006–2007)
- Sebastián Guerrero – Čukarički (2013–2014)

== China ==
- Cheng Mouyi – Spartak Subotica (2010–2011)
- **Jia Xiuquan** – Partizan (1987–1989)
- **Li Chunyu** – Rad Beograd (2009–2010)
- Li Siqi – Inđija (2019–2020)
- **Liu Haiguang** – Partizan (1987–1989)
- Runze Hao – Radnički Niš (2019–2020)
- Yuan Xue – Radnik Surdulica (2016–2017)
- Wang Lei – Mladost Lučani (2017–2018)
- Zhong Haoran – Spartak Subotica (2016–2017), Borac Čačak (2017–2018)

== Chinese Taipei (Taiwan) ==
- **Tim Chow** – Spartak Subotica (2018–2019)

== Colombia ==
- **Andrés Colorado** – Partizan (2022–2023)
- Haider Landázuri – Proleter Novi Sad (2021–2022)
- Cristian Martínez Borja – Red Star (2010–2012)
- **Mauricio Molina** – Red Star (2007–2008)
- José Mulato – **Spartak Subotica** (2024–present)
- Dilan Ortiz – Čukarički (2019–2020), Mačva Šabac (2020–2021), Proleter Novi Sad (2021–2022), Radnički Kragujevac (2024)–2025), Mladost Lučani (2024–2025)
- Nélson Pizarro – OFK Beograd (2006–2007)
- Keimer Sandoval – **Red Star** (2024–present)

== Comoros ==
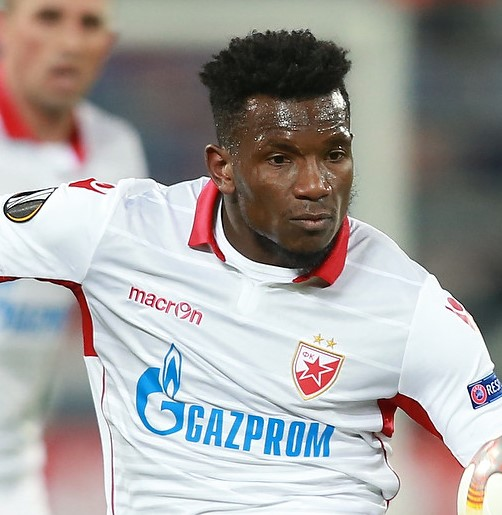
Ben, Red Star recorder in league appearances for a foreigner.

- **Ben** (El Fardou Mohamed Ben Nabouhane) – Red Star (2017–2023), Železničar Pančevo (2024–2025)

== Congo ==
- **Scott Bitsindou** – Javor Ivanjica (2017–2018)
- **Prestige Mboungou** – Metalac G.M. (2019–2021,2021–2022), **TSC Bačka Topola** (2024–present)

== Congo D.R. ==
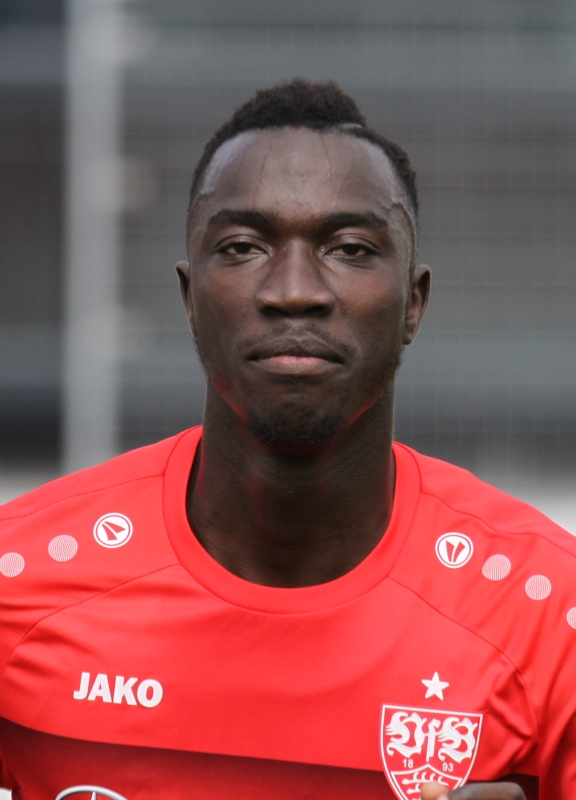
After 5 years in Stuttgart, in 2024 Red Star brought him for their CL campaign.

- **Brian Bayeye** – Radnički Niš (2024–2025)
- **Jonathan Bolingi** – Vojvodina (2023–2025)
- **Aldo Kalulu** – **Partizan** (2023–present)
- Francis Masiya – Borac Čačak (2016–2017)
- **Ibrahim Somé Salombo** – Bežanija (2007–2008), Red Star (2008–2009)
- **Silas** – Red Star (2024–2025)
- Poba Yubu Touré – Borac Čačak (2016–2017)

== Costa Rica ==
- **John Jairo Ruiz** – Red Star (2016–2017)

== Côte d'Ivoire ==
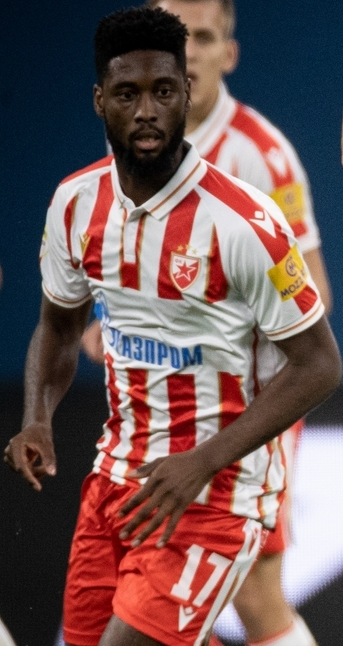
Krasso, 2023 Africa Cup of Nations champion while playing with Red Star.

- Herve Amani – Javor Ivanjica (2017–2019)
- Liam Ayad – Radnički Niš (2023–2024)
- Issiaka Dembele – **OFK Beograd** (2024–present)
- Samuel Prince Eda – Jedinstvo Ub (2024–2025)
- Ismaël Béko Fofana – Partizan (2013–2016), Čukarički (2016–2018), Vojvodina (2018–2019)
- Cèdric Gogoua – Partizan (2015–2017)
- **Sankara Karamoko** – **IMT Beograd** (2025–present)
- Lacine Koné – **Radnički Niš** (2025–present)
- **Jean-Philippe Krasso** – Red Star (2023–2024)
- Bayéré Junior Loué – **Javor Ivanjica** (2023–present)
- Ismaël Maiga – Radnički Niš 2022–2024, Tekstilac Odžaci (2024–2025), **Čukarički Belgrade** (2025–present)
- Marcel Metoua – Banat Zrenjanin (2008–2011)
- Salia Ouattara – Mladost Lučani (2014–2015)
- **Sékou Sanogo** – Red Star (2019–2023), Železničar Pančevo (2024–2025)
- Yacouba Silue – Mladost Lučani (2023–2024)
- Djakaridja Junior Traoré – **Železničar Pančevo** (2024–present)
- Caleb Zady Sery – Vojvodina (2023–2025)

== Croatia ==
Excluded the players that played before 1991 when Croatia became independent, but including the players that were Croatian Serbs born in nowadays Croatia, usually having double citizenship.

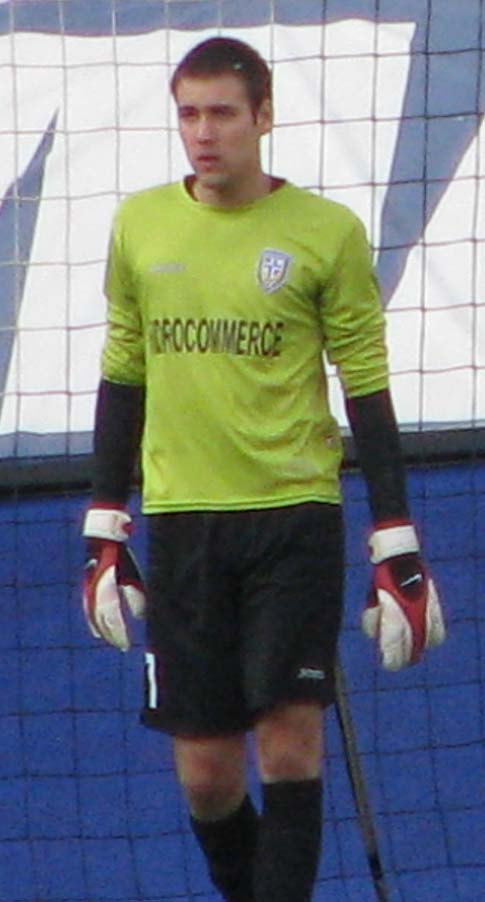
Matej Delač, Vojvodina.

- Ivan Aleksić – Jagodina (2014–2015)
- Dražen Bagarić – Kolubara Lazarevac (2022–2023)
- Gavro Bagić – Hajduk Kula (2010–2011)
- Mario Barić – Vojvodina (2013–2014)
- Slavko Bralić – Vojvodina (2019–2021)
- Luka Capan – **TSC Bačka Topola** (2024–present)
- Boro Cvetković – Borac Čačak (1994–1995)
- Dražen Cvjetković – Čukarički Stankom (1991–1994), Hajduk Kula (1994–1998)
- Josip Čalušić – TSC Bačka Topola (2021–2024)
- Frane Čirjak – Novi Pazar (2023–2024)
- Tomislav Dadić – **Radnički Kragujevac** (2023–present)
- Viktor Damjanić – Jedinstvo Ub (2024–2025)
- Matej Delač – Vojvodina (2013–2014)
- Igor Dević – OFK Beograd (2004–2007), Napredak Kruševac (2008–2009)
- Dragan Dobrić – Hajduk Kula (2008–2009)
- Duško Dukić – Jagodina (2007)–2008, 2010–2014, 2016–2017), Hajduk Kula (2007–2010), Voždovac (2013–(2014), Spartak Subotica (2014–2015)
- Lazo Džepina – Rad Beograd (1990–1995)
- Aleksandar Glamočak – Vojvodina (2000–2001)
- Dejan Godar – Spartak Subotica (1996–1997), Vojvodina (1998–1999)
- Ivica Gvozden – Rad Beograd (1990–1993)
- Ronald Habi – OFK Kikinda (1996–1998), Vojvodina (1998–2002)
- Nebojša Ivančević – Bačka Bačka Palanka (2020–2021)
- Tomislav Ivičić – Napredak Kruševac (2014–2015)
- Radovan Ivković – Bačka Bačka Palanka (2008–2010, 2012–2018)
- Saša Jelovac – Zemun (1999–2000)
- Miloš Jovičić – **TSC Bačka Topola** (2025–present)
- **Veldin Karić** – Vojvodina (1992–1993)
- Ante Knezović – Zemun (2017–2018)
- Ivan Konjević – Zemun (199_–1994)
- Darko Lunc – Železničar Pančevo (2023–2024)
- Nikica Maglica – Proleter Zrenjanin (1988–1992)
- Davor Magoč – Vojvodina (2003–2004)
- Matija Malekinušić – **Novi Pazar** (2025–present)
- Vinko Malenica – Vojvodina (1998–1999)
- Slavko Mandić – Spartak Subotica (199_–1998)
- Ljubomir Marčić – Hajduk Kula (1991–1993)
- Milan Maričić – Rad Beograd (1991–1992)
- Dušan Martić – Mladost Apatin (2005–2007)
- Milenko Milićević – Zemun (1991–1993)
- Miloš Mišić – Hajduk Kula (2010–2011)
- Ante Mitrović – Metalac G.M. (2015–2017)
- Mario Nikolić – Mačva Šabac (2020–2021)
- Dario Pavković – **Spartak Subotica** (2025–present)
- Milan Pavličić – Radnički Niš (2012–2013)
- Luka Pisačić – Bačka Bačka Palanka (2020–2021)
- Predrag Počuča – Železnik (2003–2004)
- Dejan Poljaković – Spartak Subotica (1997–2001)
- Denis Prtenjača – Čukarički (1996–2000)
- Ivan Radoš – Radnički Kragujevac (2021–2022)
- Hrvoje Rizvanović – Vojvodina (2017–2019)
- Goran Skeledžić – Spartak Subotica (1991–1994)
- Zoran Stamenić – Mladost Apatin (2005–2007)
- Dajan Šimac – Jagodina (2013–2015)
- Marko Šimić – Jagodina (2010–2012), Radnički Kragujevac (2013)–2014), Novi Pazar (2013–(2014)
- Marko Šimić – Radnički Kragujevac (2022–2023)
- Damir Šovšić – Radnik Surdulica (2023–2024)
- Novak Tepšić – Voždovac (2023–2024)
- Filip Tomašković – Spartak Subotica (2021–2022)
- Mile Vujasin – Mačva Šabac (2019–2020), Inđija (2020–2021)
- **Ante Vukušić** – Kolubara Lazarevac (2022–2023)

Croatian internationals that played in Serbian top league clubs only during Yugoslav period:

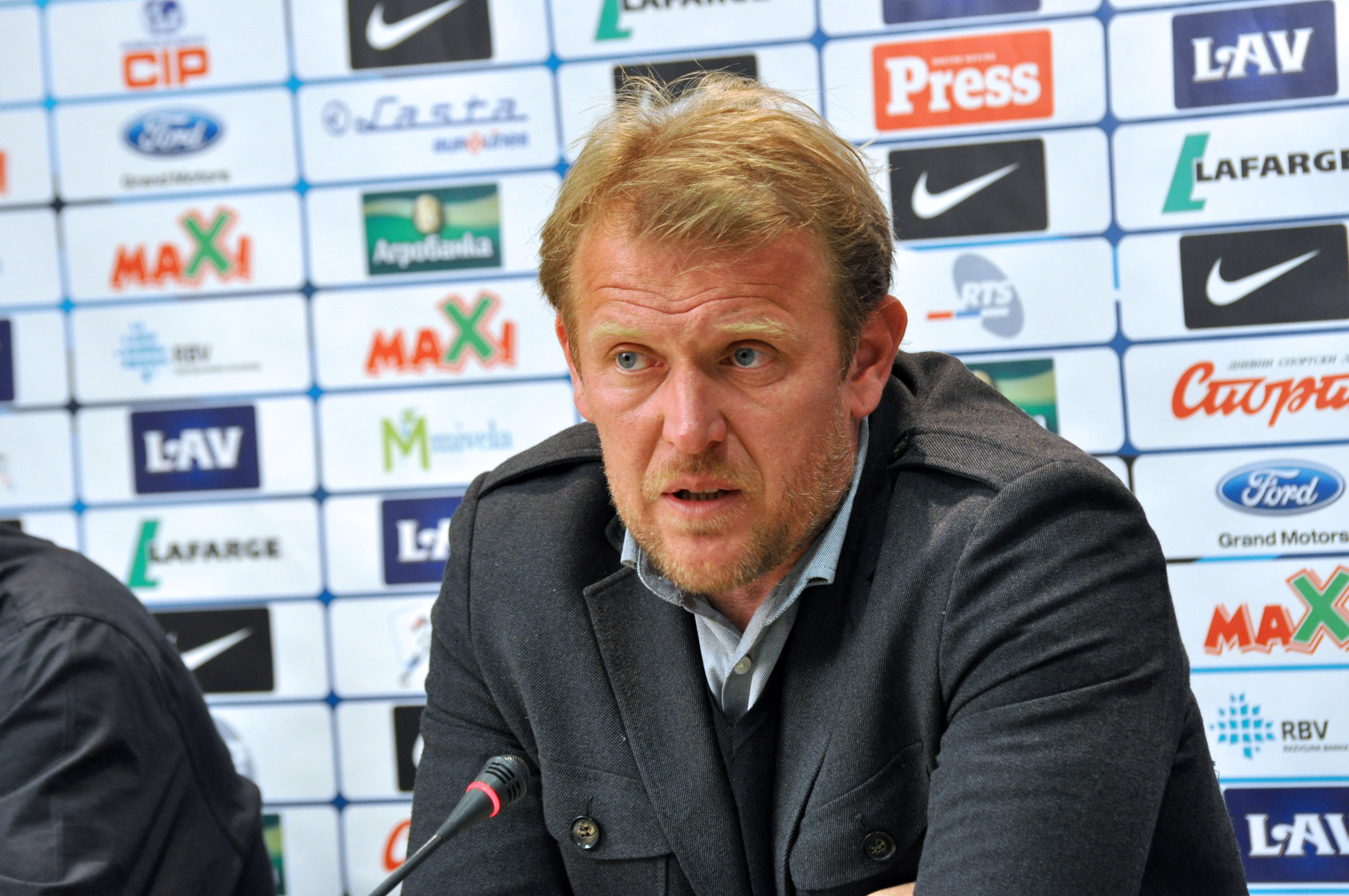
Robert Prosinečki, first as player, then more recently as coach, at Red Star.

- **Ivan Cvjetković** – Rad Beograd (1985–1986)
- **Goran Jurić** – Red Star (1987–1991)
- **Ardian Kozniku** – Priština (1988–1990)
- **Robert Prosinečki** – Red Star (1987–1991)
- **Kujtim Shala** – Partizan (1983–1984), Priština (1984–1989)
- **Ivo Šeparović** – Spartak Subotica (1984–1985)

Players that represented NDH (Independent State of Croatia):

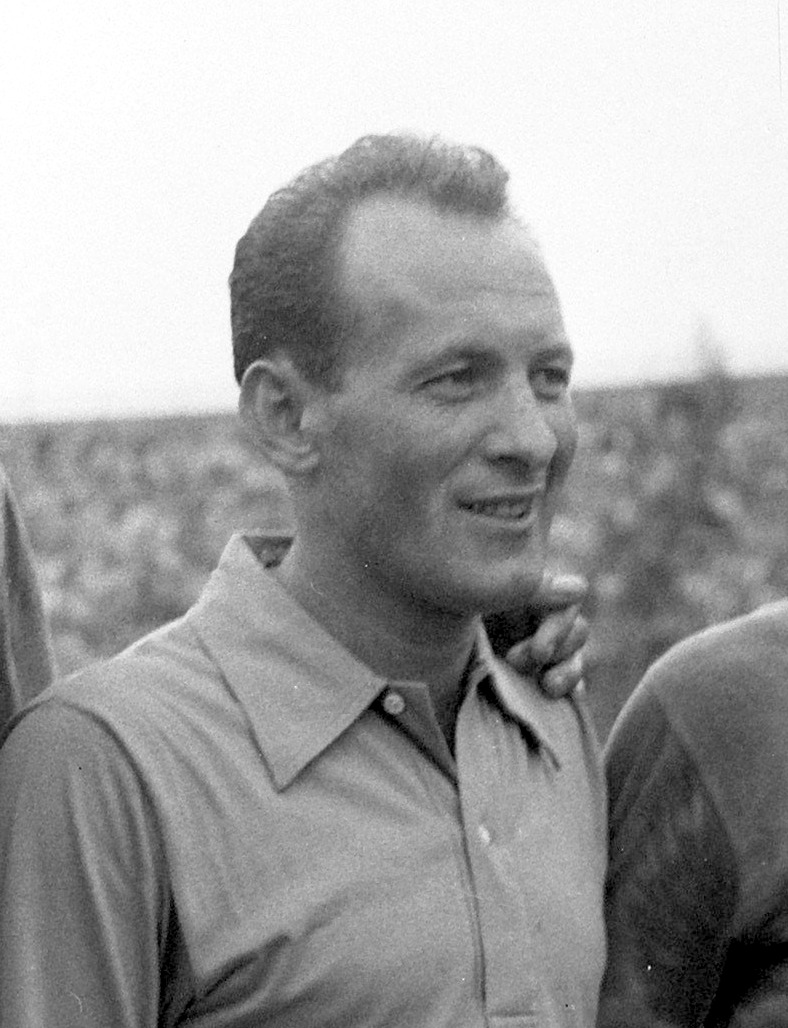
Zlatko Čajkovski, Partizan.

- **Miroslav Brozović** – Partizan (1946–1948)
- **Zlatko Čajkovski** – Partizan (1946–1955)
- **Ernest Dubac** – BSK Beograd (1937–1940)
- **Svetozar Džanić** – Vojvodina (1934–1936)
- **Franjo Glaser** – BSK Beograd (1933–1937), Partizan (1945–1947)
- **Ivan Jazbinšek** – BSK Beograd (1935–1938)
- **Gustav Lechner** – BSK Beograd (1934–1941)
- **Antun Lokošek** – Naša Krila Zemun (1947–1948)
- **Florijan Matekalo** – Partizan (1946–1947)
- **Antun Pogačnik** – Jugoslavija (193_–193_)

== Curaçao ==
- Nigel Robertha – Spartak Subotica (2024–2025)
- **Xander Severina** – Partizan (2023–2025)
- **Richairo Živković** – Red Star (2021–2022) – ( (Netherlands) when active)

== Cyprus ==
- Nikolas Asprogenis – Partizan (2004–2007)
- Konstantinos Evripidou – OFK Beograd (2023–2024)
- **Siniša Gogić** – Radnički Niš (1982–1987), Rad Beograd (1987–1989) – ( (Socialist Federal Republic of Yugoslavia) when active)
- Nemanja Kerkez – Jedinstvo Ub (2024–2025)
- Alexander Špoljarić – OFK Beograd (2014–2017)
- **Milenko Špoljarić** – OFK Beograd (1989–1992) – ( (Socialist Federal Republic of Yugoslavia) when active)
- **Vladan Tomić** – Radnički Niš (1990–1991) – ( (Socialist Federal Republic of Yugoslavia) when active)
- **Marinos Tzionis** – Čukarički (2024–2025)

== Czech Republic ==
Including the periods of Bohemia and Czechoslovakia.

- Josef Bener – BSK Beograd (1911–1912) – ( (Bohemia) when active)
- Nikola Beneš – Građanski Niš (1935–1936) – ( (Czechoslovakia) when active)
- Vladan Binić – Napredak Kruševac (2007–2010), Rad Star (2010–2011), Radnički Kragujevac (2011)–2012), Spartak Subotica (2011–(2012), Radnički Niš (2012–2013)
- **Josef Čapek** – Vojvodina (1919–1921) – ( (Czechoslovakia) when active)
- Miloš Eckert – Srpski mač (1907–1911), BSK Beograd (1911–1914, 1918–1923) – ( (Bohemia) (Czechoslovakia) when active)
- František Haas – NAK Novi Sad (1935–1939), Vojvodina (1940–1941) – ( (Czechoslovakia) when active)
- Otto Kohout – Srpski mač (1911), BSK Beograd (1911–1913) – ( (Bohemia) when active)
- František Kotrba – NAK Novi Sad (1935–1937) – ( (Czechoslovakia) when active)
- Alois Machek – Jugoslavija (1913–1914, 1918–1926) – ( (Bohemia) (Czechoslovakia) when active)
- Eduard Mifek – Velika Srbija (1913–1914) – ( (Bohemia) when active)
- Josef Papo – Srpski mač (1908–1911), BSK Beograd (1911–1912) – ( (Bohemia) when active)
- Václav Petrovický – Jugoslavija (1913–1914, 1918–1921) – ( (Bohemia) (Czechoslovakia) when active)
- Tomáš Poláček – Sloboda Užice (2010–2011)
- Josef Švácha – Srpski mač (1911), BSK Beograd (1911–1914) – ( (Bohemia) when active)
- Batko Voves – Mitić Beograd (1942–1943) – ( (Nazi Germany) when active)

== Denmark ==
- Andrija Rajović – Spartak Subotica (2020–2021,2021–2022)

== Ecuador ==
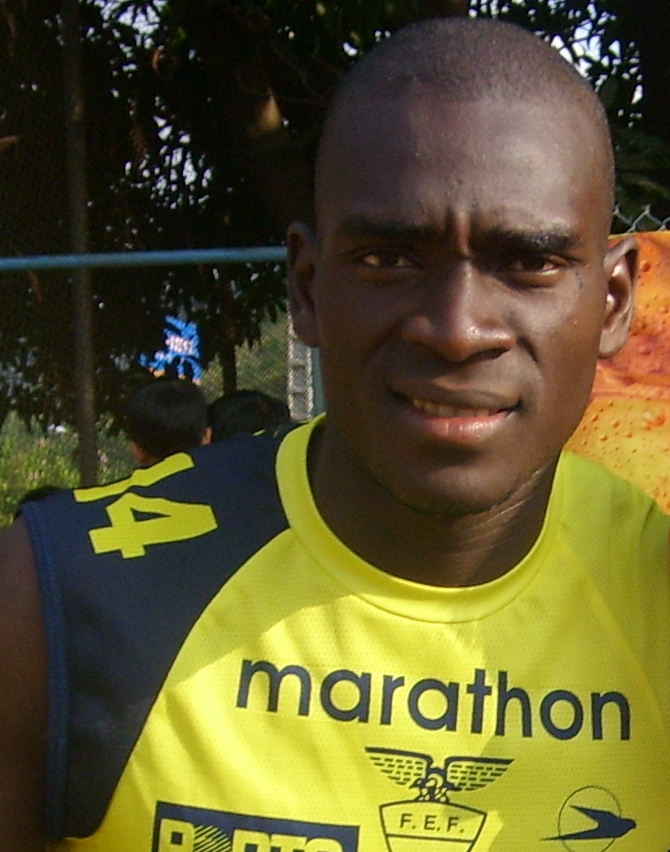
Segundo Castillo, during his period in Red Star, was the captain and commanded the game of both, the club, and Ecuador.

- Joe Arana – Jedinstvo Ub (2024–2025)
- Augusto Batioja – Inđija (2010)–2011), OFK Beograd (2010–2013), Radnički Niš (2014–2015)
- Michael Bermúdez – OFK Beograd (2024–2025)
- Walberto Caicedo – Metalac G.M. (2015–2017)
- Denil Castillo – Partizan (2023–2024)
- **Segundo Castillo** – Red Star (2006–2008)
- José Gutiérrez – Novi Pazar (2014–2015)
- Jainer Medina – Spartak Subotica (2017–2018)
- José Mina – Novi Pazar (2014–2015)
- **Franklin Salas** – Red Star (2007–2008)

== Egypt ==
- Ahmed Bogy – Dinamo Vranje (2018–2019)
- Omar Fayed – Novi Pazar (2023–2024)

== El Salvador ==
- **Vladan Vicevic** – Sloboda Užice (1986–1992, 1999–2002), Bečej (1992–1995) – ( (Socialist Federal Republic of Yugoslavia) (El Salvador) when active)

== England ==
- Goran Babic – Jedinstvo Ub (2024–2025)
- Brandon Jay Campbell – IMT (2024–2025)
- Kal Malass – Tekstilac Odžaci (2024–2025)

== Estonia ==
- **Mark Oliver Roosnupp** – Napredak Kruševac (2022–2023)
- **Bogdan Vaštšuk** – Voždovac (2023–2024)

== Finland ==
- Lauri Dalla Valle – Zemun (2017–2018)

== France ==
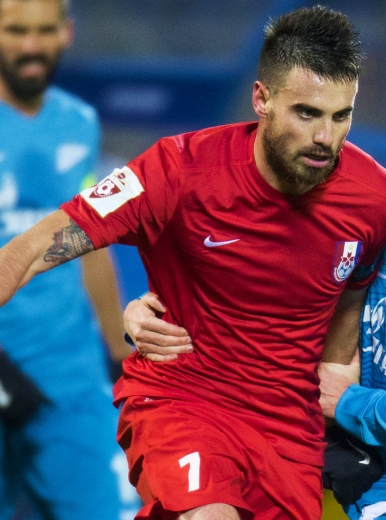
Damian Le Tallec, Red Star.

- Jean-Christophe Bahebeck – Partizan (2020–2022)
- Axel Bakayoko – Red Star (2020–2022)
- Antoine Batisse – **IMT Beograd** (2024–present)
- **Ivan Bek** – BSK Beograd (1925–1928) – ( (Kingdom of Yugoslavia) when active)
- Maxime Benayer – BSK Beograd (1923–1924)
- Justin Bengui – Jedinstvo Ub (2024–2025)
- Yohan Bilingi – **FK Spartak Subotica** (2024–present)
- Ugo Bonnet – **IMT Beograd** (2024–present)
- Yoann Court – IMT Beograd (2024–2025)
- Loïs Diony – Red Star (2021–2022)
- Maxime Do Couto – IMT Beograd (2024–2025)
- Boubacari Doucouré – **Javor Ivanjica** (2020–2021,2022–present), TSC Bačka Topola (2021–2022)
- Maka Gakou – Radnički Niš (2022–2023)
- Goran Jerković – Jagodina (2015–2016)
- Vladimir Karajčić – **Železničar Pančevo** (2025–present)
- Vicky Kiankaulua – **IMT** (2025–present)
- Damien Le Tallec – Red Star (2015–2018)
- David Milinković – Rad Beograd (2012–2013)
- Marko Muslin – Red Star (2003–2004)
- Darly Nlandu – Radnički Kragujevac (2024–2025)
- Sacha Petshi – Sloboda Užice (2013–2014)
- Baptiste Roux – **TSC Bačka Topola** (2025–present)
- Banfa Sylla – Rad Beograd (2011–2012)
- Gaoussou Traoré – Radnički Niš (2023–2024)

== Gabon ==
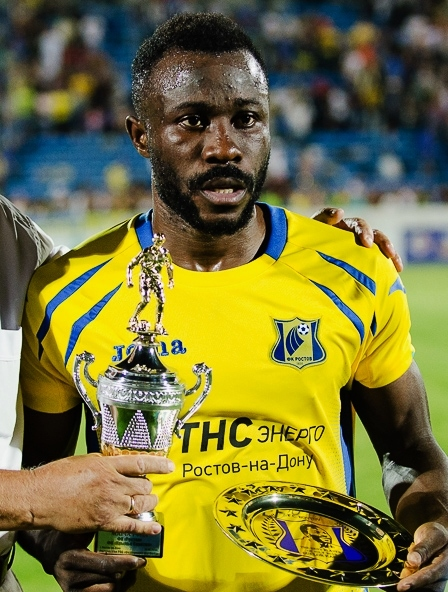
Guélor Kanga, Red Star. His compatriot Delicat in 1983 became the first African to play in Yugoslav First League.

- **Shavy Babicka** – **Red Star** (2025–present)
- **Anselme Délicat** – Vojvodina (1983–1986)
- **Guélor Kanga** – Red Star (2016–2018,2020–2025)

== Gambia, The ==
- **Muhammed Badamosi** – Čukarički (2022–2023)
- **Mahmudu Bajo** – **Red Star** (2025–present)
- **Edrissa Ceesay** – Jedinstvo Ub (2024–2025)
- Adama Jarjue – Zlatibor Čajetina (2020–2021)
- Modou Jobe – Inđija (2020–2021)
- Ousman Marong – Radnik Surdulica (2022–2023)
- **Sulayman Marreh** – Železničar Pančevo (2023–2024)
- **Sainey Njie** – Radnik Surdulica (2023–2024)

== Georgia ==
- **Irakli Azarovi** – Red Star (2022–2023)
- **Guram Giorbelidze** – Vojvodina (2023–2024)
- Irakli Goginashvili – Novi Pazar (2015–2016)
- Levan Jordania – **Jedinstvo Ub** (2024–present)
- Mikheil Khutsishvili – Vojvodina (2008–2010)
- Davit Kokhia – Vojvodina (2014–2015)
- **Giorgi Merebashvili** – Vojvodina (2009–2012)
- **Giorgi Papunashvili** – Radnički Niš (2022–2023)
- Anton Tolordava – Radnički Niš (2022–2023)

== Germany ==
Including West Germany from 1949 to 1990.

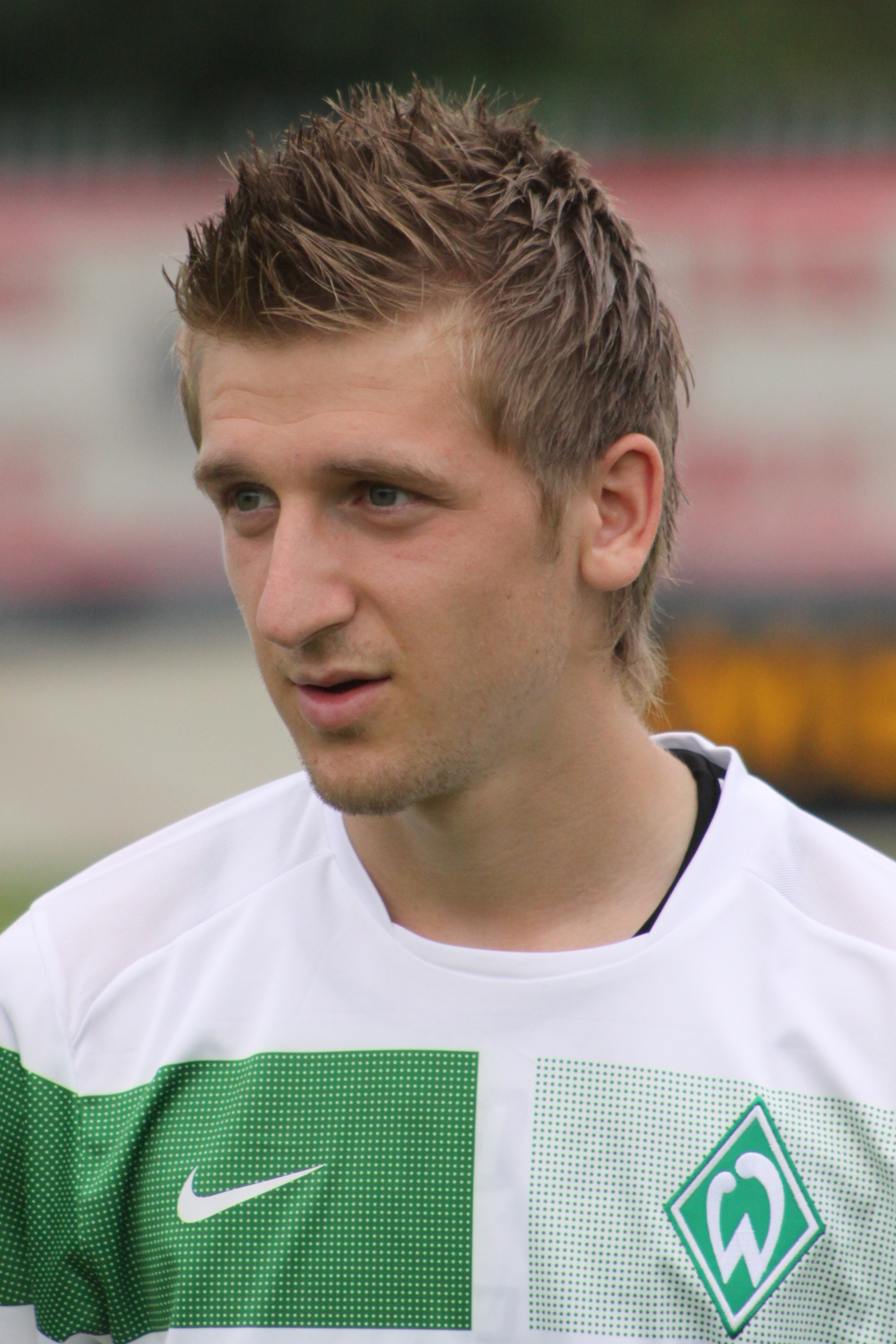
Marko Marin, German international, signed with Red Star when they reached the group stage of 2018–19 UEFA Champions League.

- Alexander Arsović – OFK Beograd (2002–2003), Red Star (2004–2005)
- Leon Borković – **Železničar Pančevo** (2024–present)
- Milan Delević – IMT Beograd (2023–2024)
- Erich Feldmann – BUSK Beograd (1924–1925)
- Nikola Ilić – Borac Čačak (2016–2017)
- Janko David Jeremić – Radnicki Kragujevac (2021–2022)
- Luka Losić – Voždovac (2017–2019)
- **Marko Marin** – Red Star (2018–2020)
- Gustav Mut – Grafičar Beograd (1931–1932)
- Karl Otterbein – Bačka Subotica (193x–1949) – ( (Nazi Germany) (West Germany) when active)
- Aleksandro Petrović – Zemun (2006–2008), Čukarički Stankom (2007–(2008)
- Matthias Predojević – Milicionar Beograd (1997–1999), Vojvodina (2001–2002)
- Robert Puha – Spartak Subotica (1989–1990) – ( (West Germany) when active)
- Thomas Vasov – Borac Čačak (1993–1996)

== Ghana ==
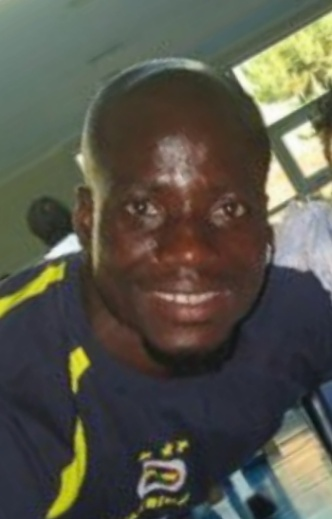
Stephen Appiah, Vojvodina, one of the best known foreigners to play in Serbia.

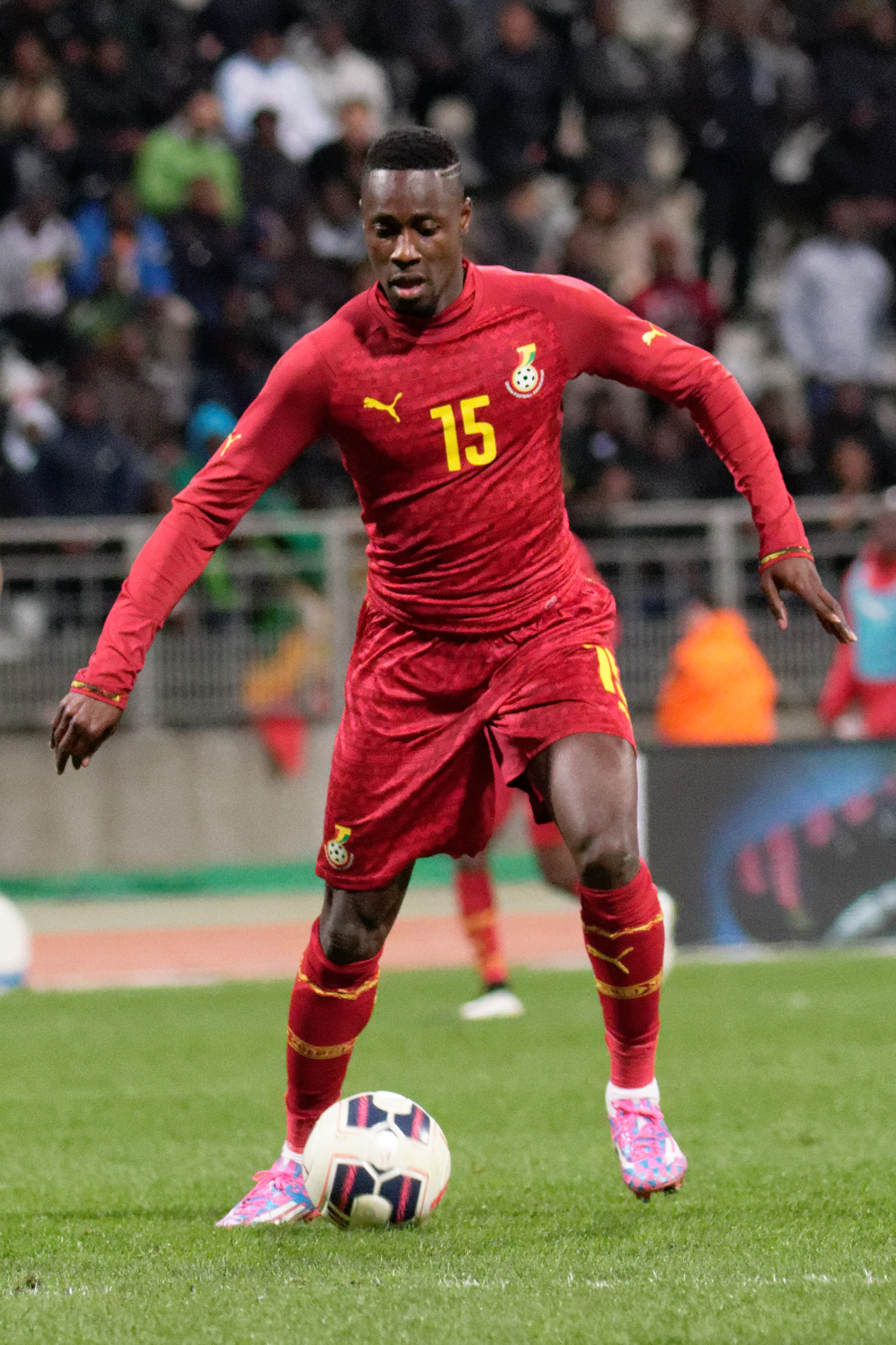
Richmond Boakye, Red Star striker.

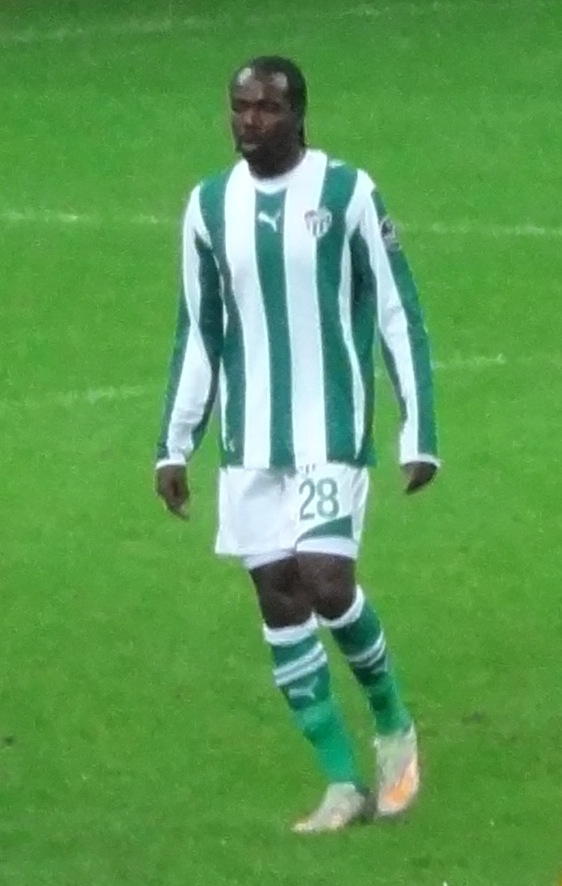
Prince Tagoe, Partizan striker.

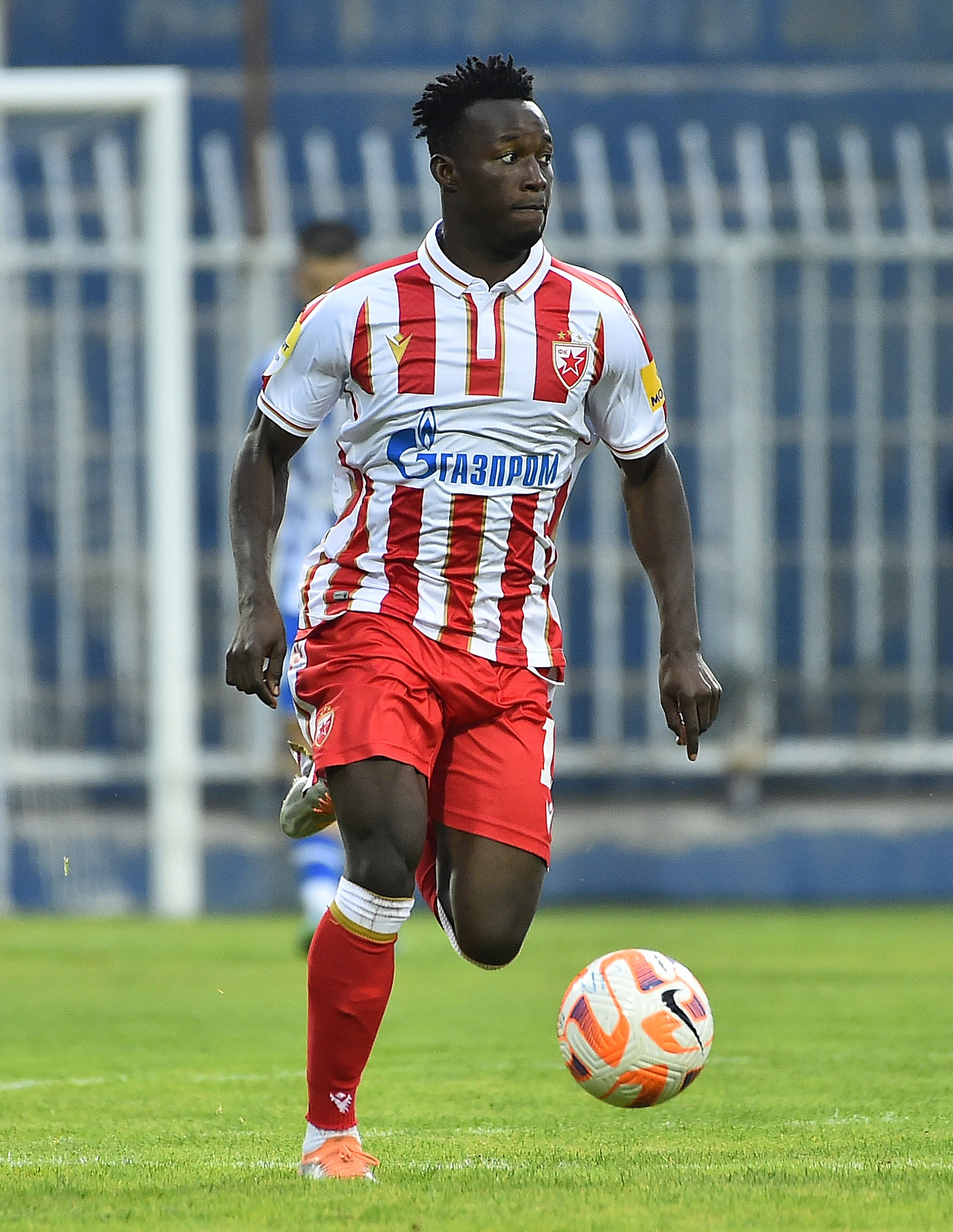
Osman Bukari, Red Star and Ghana star at the 2022 World Cup.

- Issah Abass – **Jedinstvo Ub** (2024–present)
- Sadick Abubakar – **Radnik Surdulica** (2022–present)
- **Sadick Adams** – Vojvodina (2009–2010)
- Addoquaye Addo – Red Star (2007–2008)
- **Edmund Addo** – Spartak Subotica (2022–2023), Red Star (2023–2024), Radnički Niš (2023–2024), **OFK Beograd** (2024–present)
- Henry Addo – **OFK Beograd** (2025–present)
- **Lee Addy** – Red Star (2010–2012), Čukarički (2015–2016)
- **Dominic Adiyiah** – Partizan (2010–2011)
- Francis Afriyie – Vojvodina (2016–2018)
- Samuel Afum – Spartak Subotica (2018–2019)
- Gershon Akuffo – Napredak Kruševac (2009–2010)
- **Karim Alhassan** – Radnički Kragujevac (2013–2014)
- Johnson Amuzu – Javor Ivanjica (2023–2024)
- **Ebenezer Annan** – Novi Pazar (2023–2024), OFK Beograd (2024)–2025), Red Star (2024–2025)
- Herbert Ansah – Železničar Pančevo (2024–2025)
- Bosiako Francis Antwi – **Javor Ivanjica** (2025–present)
- **Yaw Antwi** – Napredak Kruševac (2009–2010), Vojvodina (2010–2013), Metalac G.M. (2011–(2012)
- Bismarck Appiah – Bačka Bačka Palanka (2016–2017), Mladost Lučani (2017–2018)
- Eric Appiah – Metalac G.M. (2021–2022)
- **Stephen Appiah** – Vojvodina (2011–2012)
- **Alfred Arthur** – Jagodina (2008–2009)
- Isaac Kwabena Arthur – **Voždovac** (2023–present)
- Kennedy Asamoah – Borac Čačak (2016–2017)
- **Nathaniel Asamoah** – Red Star (2011–2013)
- Jonas Asare – Javor Ivanjica (2016–2018)
- Daniel Awuni – **Čukarički** (2024–present)
- Joseph Bempah – Vojvodina (2016–2018), Proleter Novi Sad (2018–2019)
- **Richmond Boakye** – Red Star (2016–2018, 2018–2021)
- Joshua Boateng – OFK Beograd (2008-2009)
- **Kennedy Boateng** – Jagodina (2008–2010)
- **Kwame Boateng** – Metalac G.M. (2011–2012)
- Kwaku Bonsu Osei – Spartak Subotica (2022–2023)
- **Francis Bossman** – Sloboda Užice (2010–2012, 2014–2015), Jagodina (2012–2013)
- **Osman Bukari** – Red Star (2022–2024)
- Joseph Cudjoe – Radnički Kragujevac (2014–2015)
- Richardson Kwaku Denzell – **Jedinstvo Ub** (2024–present)
- **Haminu Draman** – Red Star (2005–2006)
- Emmanuel Dzigbah – **Čukarički** (2024–present)
- Abraham Frimpong – Vojvodina (2011)–2012), Napredak Kruševac (2011–2016), Red Star (2016–2018)
- Abdul Rashid Fuseini – TSC Bačka Topola (2022–2023)
- Iddriss Razak Fuseini – **Radnički Niš** (2023-2024)
- Abel Hammond – Metalac G.M. (2010–2011)
- Mohammed-Awal Issah – Red Star (2008–2011)
- Kojo Kankam – Radnički Niš (2012–2013)
- Kwaku Karikari – **Železničar Pančevo** (2025–present)
- Owusu-Ansah Kontor – Metalac G.M. (2011–2015), Novi Pazar (2015–2016)
- Andy Francis Kumi – Radnički Niš (2023)–2024)
- Francis Kyeremeh – Jagodina (2015–2016), Radnik Surdulica (2016–2019)
- **Abubakar Moro** – Donji Srem (2014–2015)
- Ibrahim Mustapha – Zlatibor Čajetina (2020–2021), Red Star (2021)–2022,2022–2023), Novi Pazar (2021-(2022), **Vojvodina** (2025–present)
- Abdul Rashid Obuobi – Donji Srem (2014–2016), Voždovac (2020–2021,2021-2022)
- Joseph Opoku – Radnički Niš (2024–2025)
- Ferdinand Opoku – Rad Beograd (2011–2012)
- Kwadwo Opoku Ackah – OFK Beograd (2024–2025)
- Clinton Osei – **Novi Pazar** (2025–present)
- Kwaku Bonsu Osei – **Spartak Subotica** (2022–present)
- Quincy Osei – Hajduk Kula (2011–2012)
- **Godwin Osei Bonsu** – Radnički Kragujevac (2014–2015)
- Douglas Owusu – **Radnik Surdulica** (2024–present)
- Leonard Owusu – **Partizan** (2023–present)
- **Samuel Owusu** – Radnik Surdulica (2014–2016), Čukarički (2017–2019,2022–2023), OFK Beograd (2024–2025)
- Vilson Kwame Owusu – Čukarički (2019–2020)
- Emmanuel Quarshie – **Radnik Surdulica** (2025–present)
- Abdul Rashid Fuseini – TSC Bačka Topola (2022–2023)
- Iddriss Razak Fuseini – Radnički Niš (2023–2024)
- Obeng Regan – Napredak Kruševac (2012–2014), Čukarički (2014–2017), Mladost Lučani (2020–2021), Tekstilac Odžaci (2024–2025)
- **Rashid Sumaila** – Red Star (2018–2019)
- Zakaria Suraka – Radnik Surdulica (2015–2016), Dinamo Vranje (2016–2019), Mladost Lučani (2019–2020)
- **Prince Tagoe** – Partizan (2010–2011)
- Ibrahim Tanko – Mladost Lučani (2019–2020), Javor Ivanjica (2020–2024), Radnički Niš (2024–2025)
- Michael Tawiah – Borac Čačak (2014–2015)
- Sulemana Toffic – **Jedinstvo Ub** (2024–present)
- Skima Togbe – **Novi Pazar** (2024–present)
- Godswill Vadze – **Čukarički** (2024–present)
- Abdul Razak Yusif – **Železničar Pančevo** (2024–present)
- Ibrahim Zubairu – Jedinstvo Ub (2022–2024), **Partizan** (2024–present)

== Greece ==
- Theodoros Apostolidis – Bor (1969–1972)
- Nikolaos Baxevanos – Spartak Subotica (2022–2023)
- Giannis Charontakis – Vojvodina (2016-2017)
- Diamantis Chouchoumis – Vojvodina (2018–2019)
- Andreas Dermitzakis – Radnik Surdulica (2018–2019)
- Galanos – Obilić (1942–1943)
- Lefteris Matsoukas – Dinamo Vranje (2018–2020)
- Nemanja Milojević – Čukarički (2016–2018, 2023–2025), Vojvodina (2018–2019), Voždovac (2020–2022), Kolubara Lazarevac (2022–2023), Novi Pazar (2023)–2024), **Mladost Lučani** (2025–present)
- Sifnios – Somborski SK (1930)
- Anastasios Tselios – Radnički Kragujevac (2024–2025)
- Dimitrios Tzinovits – IMT Beograd (2022–2024)
- Andreas Vlachomitros – Javor Ivanjica (2016–2017)
- Michalis Zistakis – Jedinstvo Beograd (1924–1925), Radnički Beograd (1925–1926)

== Guadeloupe ==
- **Kilian Bevis** – **Radnički Kragujevac** (2023–present)
- Thomas Phibel – Red Star (2016–2017) – ( (France) when active)

== Guinea ==
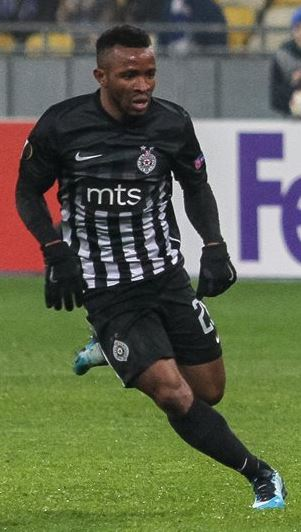
Seydouba Soumah, Partizan and Novi Pazar.

- **Abdoulaye Cissé** – **Novi Pazar** (2020–2021, 2023–2024, 2025–present)
- Abdoulaye Kamara – **IMT Beograd** (2025–present)
- **Sekou Keita** – Voždovac (2021–2022)
- **Seydouba Soumah** – Partizan (2017–2018, 2019–2021), Novi Pazar (2023–2024)
- Kalla Toure – Sloboda Užice (2012–2013)

== Guinea-Bissau ==
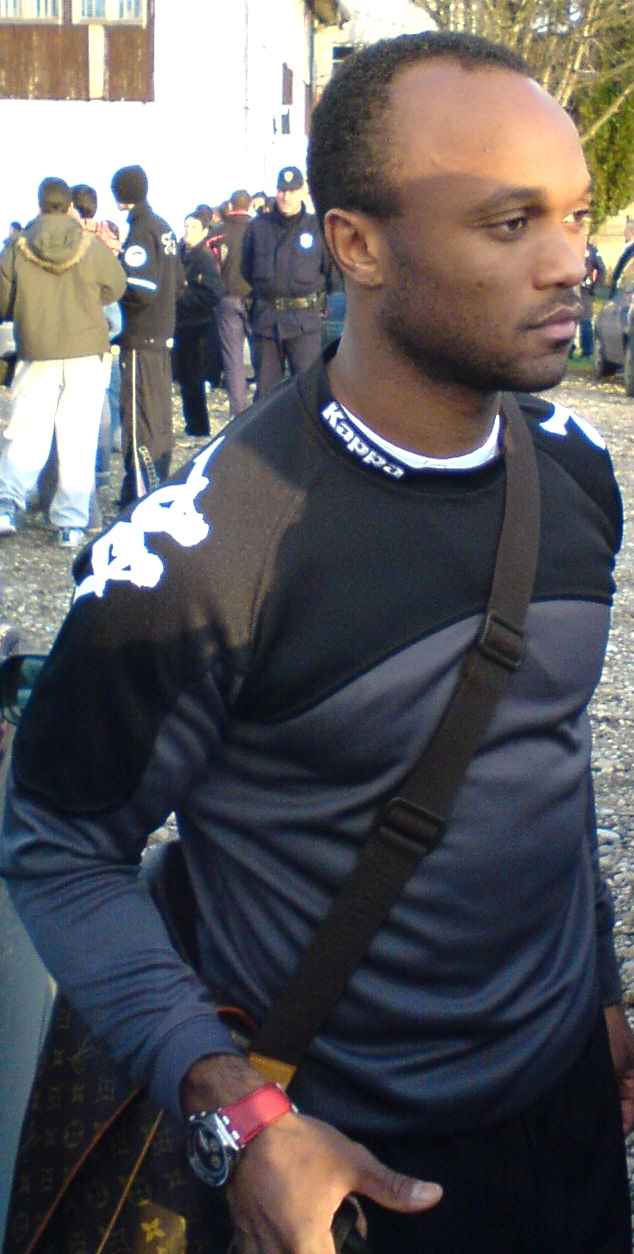
Moreira, Partizan fans idol.

- **Bacar Baldé** – Borac Čačak (2016–2017)
- **Dálcio** – Red Star (2024–2025)
- **Ednilson** – Partizan (2007–2008) – ( (Portugal) when active)
- **Kaby Djaló** – Red Star (2012-2013)
- **Almami Moreira** – Partizan (2007–2011), Vojvodina (2011–2013) – ( (Portugal) when active)
- Zé Mário – Čukarički (2023–2024)

== Honduras ==
- **Kervin Arriaga** – Partizan (2024–2025)
- **Luis Garrido** – Red Star (2012–2013)

== Hong Kong ==
- **Dejan Antonić** – Spartak Subotica (1989–1990), Napredak Kruševac (1990–1992), Obilić (1994–1995) – ( (Socialist Federal Republic of Yugoslavia) (Serbia and Montenegro) when active)

== Hungary ==
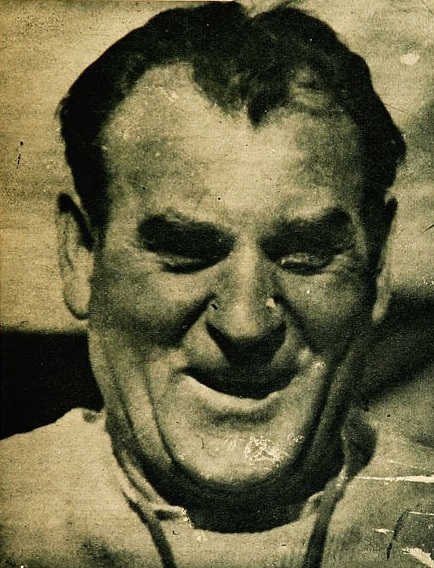
Ferenc Plattkó, before spending 7 seasons in FC Barcelona, played with KAFK Kula.

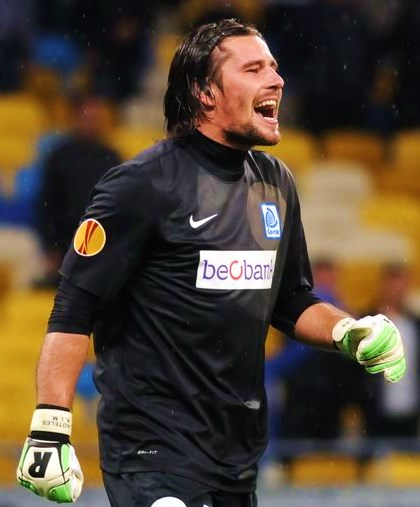
László Köteles, another Hungarian goalkeeper that spent part of his career in Serbia.

István Nyers, who played with Inter, Roma and Barcelona among others, played with ŽAK Subotica during WWII and in 1945.

Including the period of Austro-Hungary.

- Eugen Ábrahám aka Saraz II – Vojvodina (1923–1924)
- János Báki – Radnički Kragujevac (1945–1946)
- Lajos Barna – Bačka Subotica (1939–1940)
- Árpád Blau – BSK Beograd (1920–1921)
- Gyula Blau – Velika Srbija (1913–1914), Juda Makabi (1921–1923)
- Bertalan Bocskay – TSC Bačka Topola (2021–2022)
- Ferenc Bódi – NAK Novi Sad (1937–1942)
- **János Borsó** – Vojvodina (1985–1986)
- Rajmond Breznik – Juda Makabi (1923–1924), NTK Novi Sad (1924–1925)
- Antun Copko – Bačka Subotica (191_–1923) – ( (Kingdom of Serbia) when active)
- Géza Copko – Bačka Subotica (191_–1925) – ( (Kingdom of Serbia) when active)
- Ladiszlav Csányi – Vojvodina (1967–1969)
- Pál Dárdai – Vojvodina (1985–1986)
- Dezső – Vojvodina (1919–1920)
- Kálmán Dobi – NAK Novi Sad (1924–1925)
- Sándor Dudás – Vojvodina (1921–1926)
- József Dzurják – Spartak Subotica (1990–1991)
- Gyula Ellbogen – BSK Beograd (1923–1924)
- **József Fábián** – NAK Novi Sad (193x–194x)
- István Gligor – OFK Beograd (1973–1974)
- Árpád Gőgös – NAK Novi Sad (193x–1937)
- Nándor Guttmann – Srpski mač (1908)
- János Hajdú – NAK Novi Sad (1924–1925)
- Nándor Hargitai – NAK Novi Sad (1940–1943)
- Gyula Hegedűs – ŽAK Subotica (1935–1937)
- **Filip Holender** – Partizan (2020–2022)
- **Gyula Horváth** – NAK Novi Sad (1924–1925)
- Zoltan Inotai – SAND Subotica (1927–1929)
- **Jenő Kalmár** – Radnički Beograd (1945–1946)
- János Karába – NAK Novi Sad (1936–1937)
- **Zsombor Kerekes** – Bečej (1990–1996), Spartak Subotica (1996–1999) – ( (Serbia and Montenegro) when active)
- László Köteles – Železnik (2002–2003)
- Lajos Kovács – NAK Novi Sad (1937–1945)
- Ede Krausz – SAND Subotica (1921–1923)
- Bertalan Kun – Proleter Novi Sad (2021–2022)
- József Lakatos – 14. Oktobar Niš (1946–1947)
- Ferenc Makó – Partizan (195x–195x)
- Béla Mayer – Somborski SK (1923–1924)
- Szabolcs Mezei - **TSC Bačka Topola** (2025–present)
- Tamás Nagy – Spartak Subotica (1990–1991)
- Károly Nemes – NAK Novi Sad (1919–1924), Jugoslavija (1924–1925)
- **István Nyers** – ŽAK Subotica (1941–1945), Spartak Subotica (1945–1946)
- Mario Onhaus – Hajduk Kula (1999–2000)
- **Sándor Peics** – Vojvodina (1929–1930)
- **Ferenc Plattkó** – KAFK Kula (1921–1922)
- Zsolt Radics – Spartak Subotica (1998–2001)
- András Rózsa – ŽAK Kikinda (1935–1936)
- József Rumos – NAK Novi Sad (193_–1941)
- **József Schaller** – KAFK Kula (1924–1925)
- Lajos Schönfeld aka Tusko – NAK Novi Sad (1918–1920), Vojvodina (1921–1922), BSK Beograd (1922–1924)
- **Vilmos Sipos** – Jugoslavija (1930–1931) – ( (Kingdom of Yugoslavia) when active)
- Bence Sós – TSC Bačka Topola (2023–2025)
- Gyula Spitz – Partizan (1946–1947)
- Toni Szabó – BSK Beograd (1921–1924)
- Sándor Szluha – Vojvodina (1939–1940), NAK Novi Sad (1940–1942)
- Adrián Szőke – TSC Bačka Topola (2022–2023)
- Gusztáv Taupert – Bačka Subotica (1923)
- Janos Thurzó – NAK Novi Sad (193x–1937)
- Tőrők – BSK Beograd (1920–1921)
- **Flórián Urbán** – Spartak Subotica (1999–2000)
- Sándor Weisz – Juda Makabi (1921–1923), Vojvodina (1923–1927, 1928–1929)

== Indonesia ==
- **Ilija Spasojević** – Vojvodina (2002–2005), Borac Čačak (2009–2010) – ( (Serbia and Montenegro) when active)
- **Witan Sulaeman** – Radnik Surdulica (2019–2021)

== Iraq ==
- **Rebin Sulaka** – Radnički Niš (2019–2020)

== Ireland ==
- Ali Reghba – **TSC Bačka Topola** (2024–present)

== Israel ==
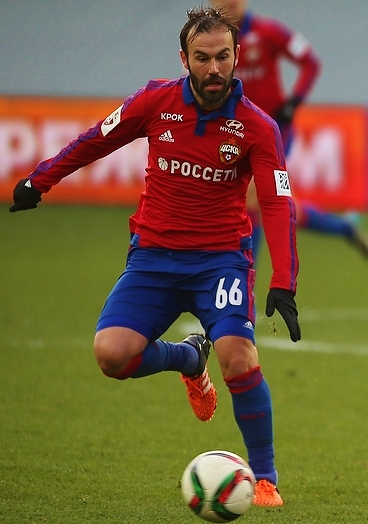
Natcho, Israel national team long-standing captain, joined Partizan in summer 2019.

- **Omri Glazer** – **Red Star** (2023–present)
- **Bibras Natcho** – **Partizan** (2019–present)
- **Idan Vered** – Red Star (2015–2016)

== Italy ==
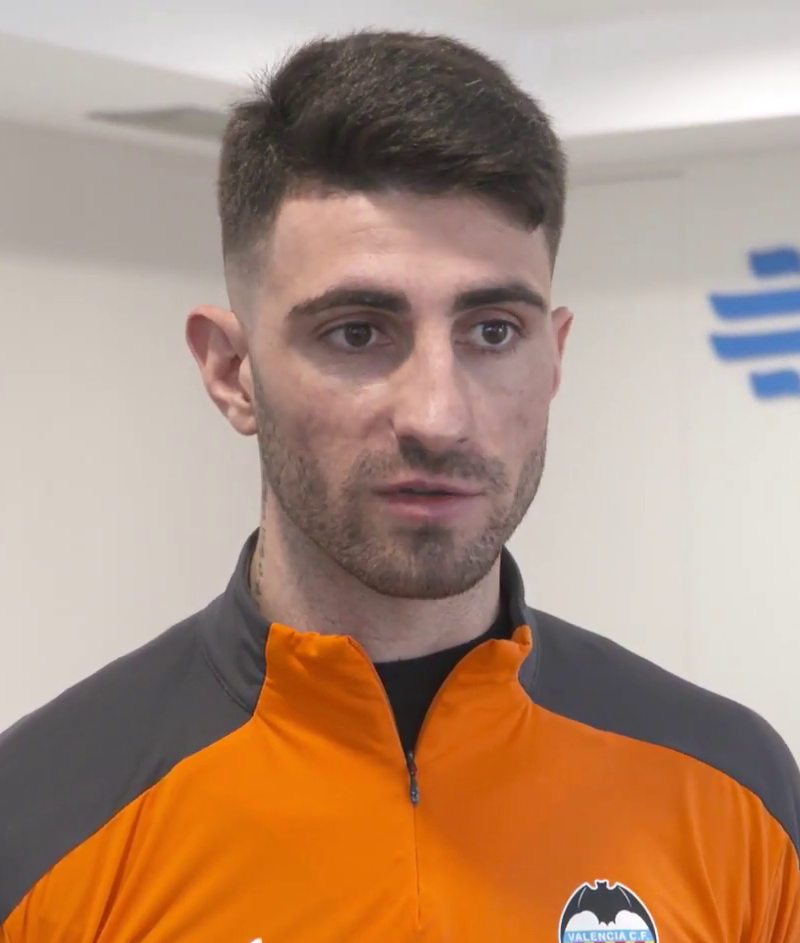
Piccini, Red Star defender and Italian international..

- Giovanni Bertotto – Jedinstvo Beograd (1924–1925)
- Luigi Di Franco – Jedinstvo Beograd (1937–1941), Jugoslavija (1941–1942)
- Diego Falcinelli – Red Star (2020–2021)
- Filippo Falco – Red Star (2020–2024)
- Otmar Gazzari – BSK Beograd (1929–1933)
- Emanuele Lirussi – OFK Beograd (2005–2006)
- Claudio Maccarone – Vojvodina (2007-2008)
- Henoc N′Gbesso – Radnički Kragujevac (2023–2024)
- Bob Omoregbe – **Novi Pazar** (2025–present)
- **Cristiano Piccini** – Red Star (2021–2022)
- Rodolfo Tommasi – BSK Beograd (1932–1933)

== Jamaica ==
- **Kenroy Campbell** – **IMT Beograd** (2024–present)
- **Norman Campbell** – Čukarički (2021–2022), Javor Ivanjica (2022–2023), Vojvodina (2023–2024)
- Ahir Dixon – Novi Pazar (2024–2025)
- **Junior Flemmings** – Voždovac (2023–2024)
- **Trivante Stewart** – Javor Ivanjica (2023–2024), Radnički Niš (2024–2025)

== Japan ==
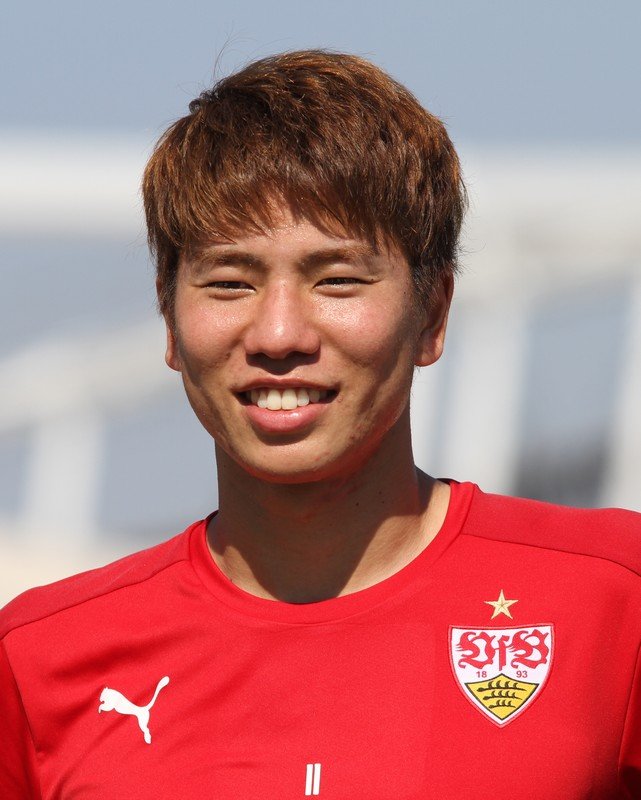
Asano, summer 2019 Partizan reinforcement, regular international, response to Red Star Takayuki Suzuki sensational signing previous decade.

- **Takuma Asano** – Partizan (2019–2021)
- Mitsusuke Maruyama – Hajduk Kula (2002–2003)
- Ryohei Michibuchi – Radnički Niš (2021–2023)
- Ryohei Miyazaki – Bačka Bačka Palanka (2020–2021)
- Shingo Morita – Rad Beograd (2003–2004)
- Takuya Murayama – Zemun (2018–2019)
- Ryosuke Nagasawa – Radnički Niš (2021–2022)
- Ryota Noma – Radnički Niš (2016–2020)
- Keisuke Ogawa – Sloboda Užice (2013–2014)
- Shohei Okuno – Sloboda Užice (2013–2014)
- Arihiro Sentoku – Voždovac (2022–2023)
- Noboru Shimura – Spartak Subotica (2017–2019,2020–2023)
- **Takayuki Suzuki** – Red Star (2005–2007)
- Ryu Wakabayashi – **IMT Beograd** (2025–present)
- Sho Yamamoto – Spartak Subotica (2019–2020)

== Kazakhstan ==
- **Nenad Erić** – Radnički Kragujevac (2001–2002), OFK Beograd (2003–2004, 2005–2006), Borac Čačak (2006–2008) – ( (Serbia and Montenegro) when active)
- **Maxim Fedin** – Spartak Subotica (2014–2016)
- **Bauyrzhan Turysbek** – Radnički Niš (2014–2015)
- **Aleksandr Zuyev** – IMT Beograd (2023–2024)

== Kenya ==
- **Richard Odada** – Red Star (2020–2021), Metalac G.M. (2021–2022), OFK Beograd (2024–2025)
- **Collins Sichenje** – **Vojvodina** (2024–present)

== Korea, D.P.R. of ==
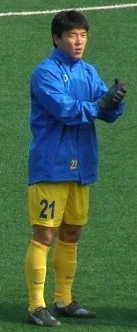
Hong Yong-jo, North Korean captain at the WC2010 played with Bežanija.

- **Hong Yong-jo** – Bežanija (2007–2008)
- **So Hyon-uk** – Zemun (2018–2019)
- Yong Lee-ja – Napredak Kruševac (2009–2010)

== Korea, Republic of ==
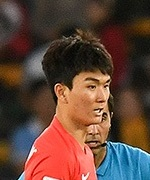
Hwang In-beom, Red Star.

- Byeon Jae-min – Dinamo Vranje (2018–2019)
- Cho Yong-kyo – Mladost Apatin (2006–2007)
- **Goh Young-jun** – Partizan (2023–2025)
- Ha Sang-hyun – Radnički Obrenovac (2003–2005)
- **Hwang In-beom** – Red Star (2023–2025)
- Hwang Jong-won – Rad Beograd (2016–2018)
- Jang Su-min – Borac Čačak (2016–2017)
- Jo Jin-ho – Novi Pazar (2023–2024), Radnički Niš (2024–2025)
- **Kim Chi-woo** – Partizan (2004–2005)
- Lee San-hyeon – Bežanija (2007–2009)
- Park In-hyeok – Vojvodina (2017–2018)
- Park Ji-soo – Borac Čačak (2016–2017)
- Park Tae-gyu – Bežanija (2007–2010), BSK Borča (2012–2013)
- **Seol Young-woo** – **Red Star** (2024–present)
- Son Joon-hyo – Rad Beograd (2017–2018)
- Yoo Ji-un – Čukarički (2023–2024)

== Kosovo ==
Counting only players that played for Kosovo national team and in clubs within Serbian league system, after 1992, outside province of Kosovo.

- Halil Asani – Vojvodina (2001–2002) – ( (Serbia and Montenegro) when active)
- Ismet Berisha – Železnik (1997–1998) – ( (Serbia and Montenegro) when active)
- Sead Gorani – Železnik (1998–2001) – ( (Serbia and Montenegro) when active)
- Enes Maliqi – Milicionar Beograd (1997–1998) – ( (Serbia and Montenegro) when active)
- **Isa Sadriu** – Partizan (1985–1986) – ( (Socialist Federal Republic of Yugoslavia) when active)
- Nermin Useni – Javor Ivanjica (2001–2003), Radnički Obrenovac (2002–(2003), Radnički Beograd (2003–2005), Hajduk Kula (2005–2006), Mladost Lučani (2006–2008, 2011–2013) – ( (Serbia and Montenegro) (Serbia) when active)
- Arton Zekaj – Bačka Bačka Palanka (2016–2017) – ( (Serbia) when active)

== Krajina ==
- **Zoran Čugalj** – Sartid Smederevo (1995–1998) – ( (Serbia and Montenegro) when active)
- **Zoran Dragišić** – Hajduk Beograd (1999–2000) – ( (Serbia and Montenegro) when active)
- **Sergej Tica** – Budućnost Valjevo (199x–1997), Milicionar Beograd (1997–1998), Priština (1998–1999) – ( (Serbia and Montenegro) when active)

== Kyrgyzstan ==
- **Tamirlan Kozubayev** – Jagodina (2015–2016)
- **Anton Zemlianukhin** – Radnički Niš (2014–2016)

== Latvia ==
Including the period of Soviet Union.

- **Oļegs Karavajevs** – OFK Beograd (1990–1993) – ( (Soviet Union) when active)
- **Jevgēņijs Kazačoks** – Bačka Bačka Palanka (2020–2021)
- Anastasijs Mordatenko – Radnički Niš (2016–2017)
- Kaspars Svārups – Bačka Bačka Palanka (2020–2021)

== Lebanon ==
- Raja Asfour – Vojvodina (2021–2022)

== Liberia ==
- **Seku Conneh** – Vojvodina (2018–2019)
- **Christian Essel** – Radnički Kragujevac (2011–2012)
- **Omega Roberts** – Sloboda Užice (2011–2012), Smederevo (2012–2013), Red Star (2013–2014), Borac Čačak (2014–2015)
- Emmanuel King – **Novi Pazar** (2025–present)
- Vasco Sumo – **Novi Pazar** (2025–present)

== Libya ==
- **Mohamed El Monir** – Jagodina (2011–2014), Partizan (2016–2018)
- **Mohamed Zubya** – Partizan (2012–2013)

== Lithuania ==
Including the period of Soviet Union.

- **Justas Lasickas** – Zemun (2017–2018), Voždovac (2019–2022)
- **Daniel Romanovskij** – Zemun (2018–2019)
- **Kęstutis Ruzgys** – OFK Beograd (1991–1992) – ( (Soviet Union) when active)

== Luxembourg ==
- Issa Bah – **Radnički Kragujevac** (2024–present)
- **Seid Korać** – Vojvodina (2023–2025)

== Madagascar ==
- **Sandro Trémoulet** – **Radnik Surdulica** (2025–present)

== Mali ==
- **Kalifa Coulibaly** – Red Star (2022–2023)
- **Fousseni Diabaté** – Partizan (2022–2023)
- Lassana N'Diaye – Radnički Niš (2023–2024)
- Bakary Nimaga – Radnički Niš (2023–2024)
- **Moussa Sissako** – **IMT** (2025–present)
- Sambou Sissoko – **Čukarički** (2022–present)
- **Hamidou Traoré** – Partizan (2022–2023)
- **Mamadou Traoré** – Vojvodina (2022–2023)

== Malta ==
- **Andrei Agius** – Zemun (2003–2004)
- Boston Billups – IMT Beograd (2023–2025)
- **Paul Mbong** – **Čukarički** (2025–present)
- **Nenad Veselji** – OFK Beograd (1988–1994) – ( (Socialist Federal Republic of Yugoslavia) (Serbia and Montenegro) when active)

== Moldova ==
- Vitalie Bulat – Novi Pazar (2013)–2014), OFK Beograd (2013–(2014)

== Montenegro ==
Excluded the players that played before 2006 when Montenegro became independent. Montenegrin players that were internationals for FR Yugoslavia/Serbia and Montenegro are indicated in italics.

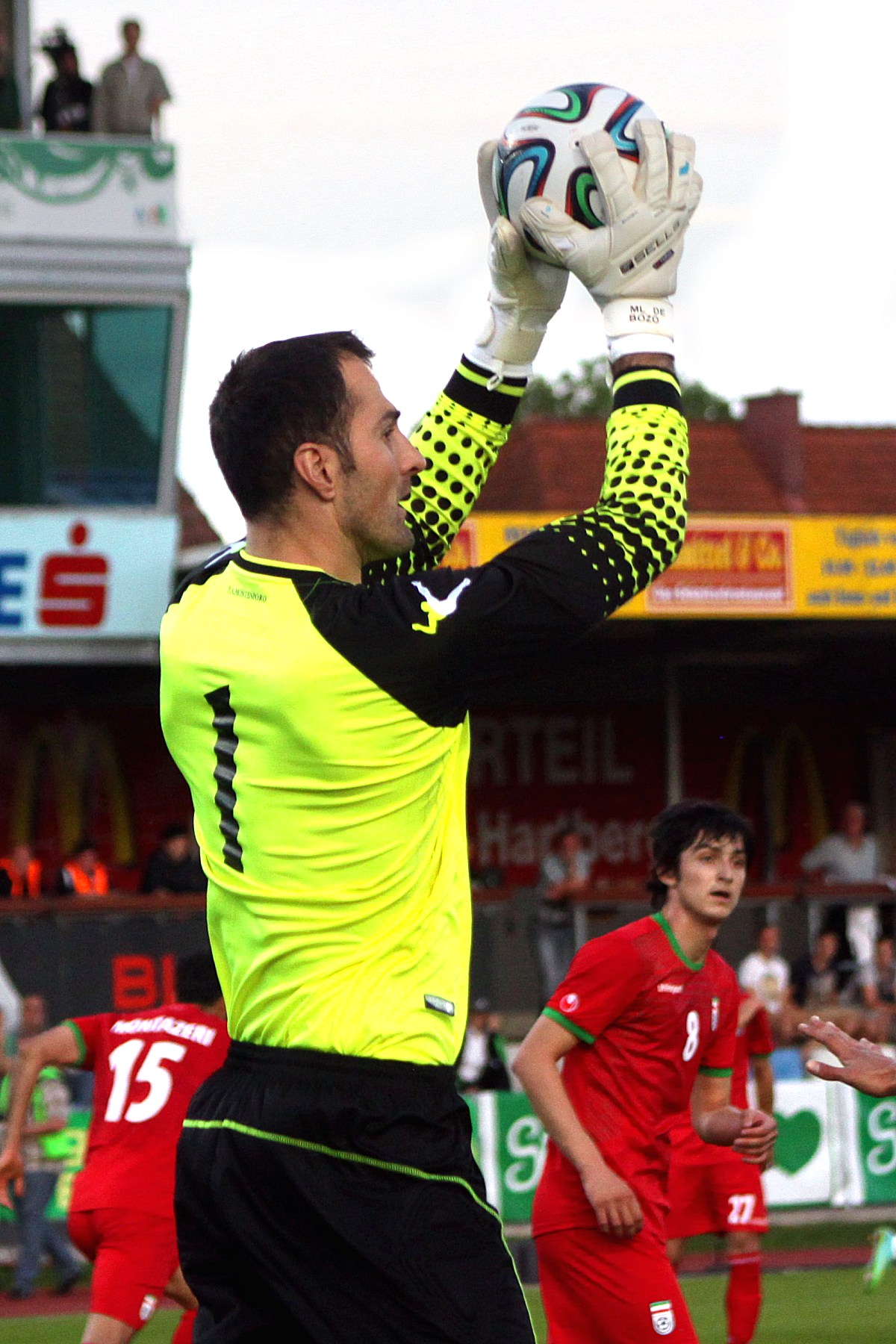
Mladen Božović, Partizan.

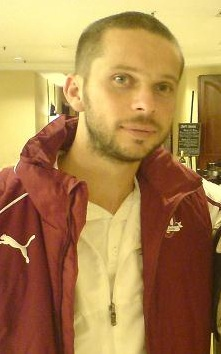
Vladimir Božović, OFK Beograd.

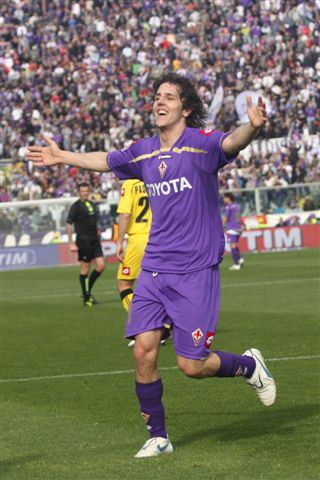
Stevan Jovetić, Partizan.

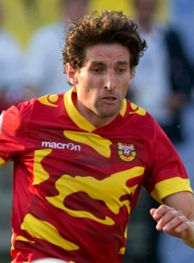
Mladen Kašćelan, OFK Beograd and Voždovac.

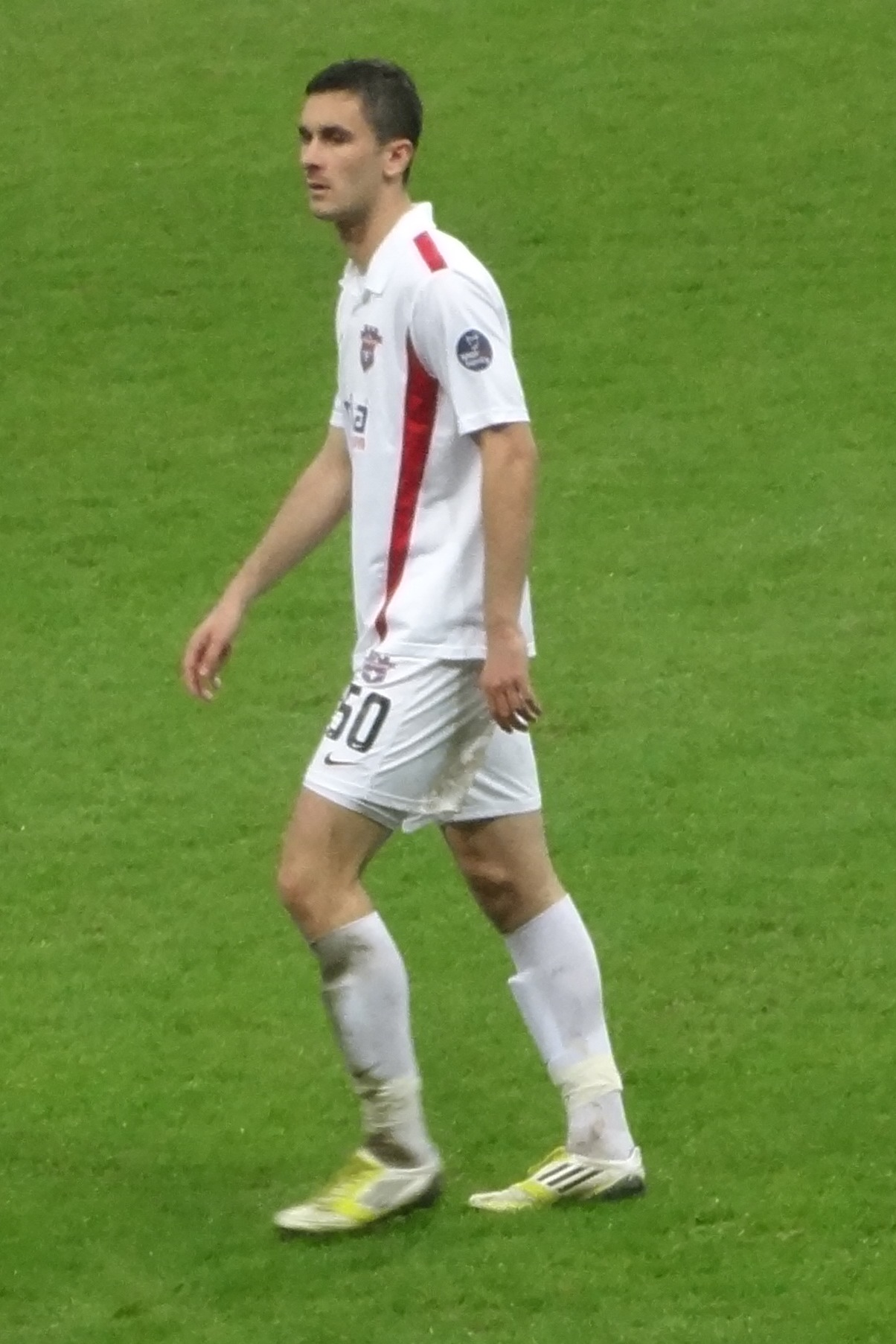
Ivan Kecojević, Čukarički and OFK Beograd.

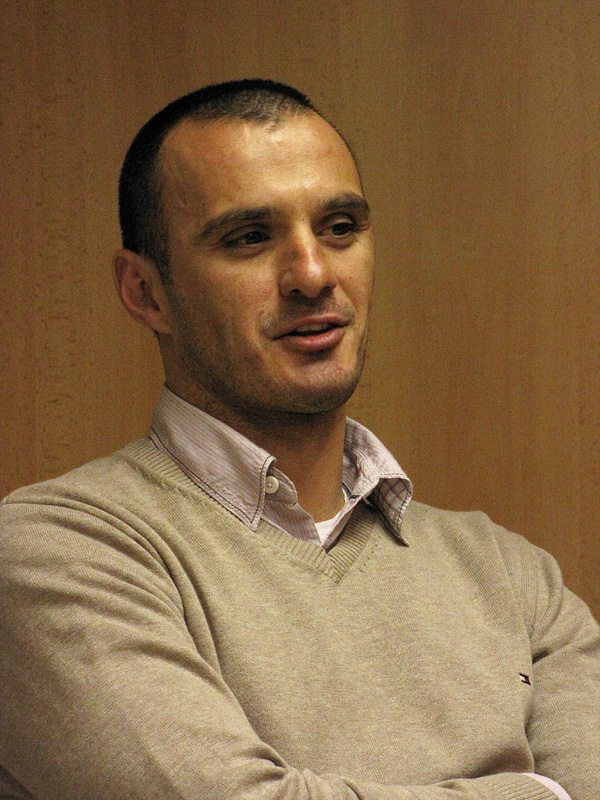
Yugoslav international goalkeeper Kralj played most of his career in Patizan.

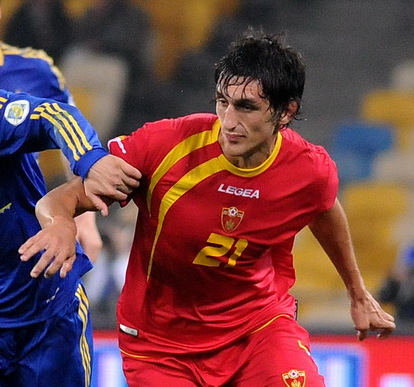
Stefan Savić, BSK Borča and Partizan, before moving to the Premier League.

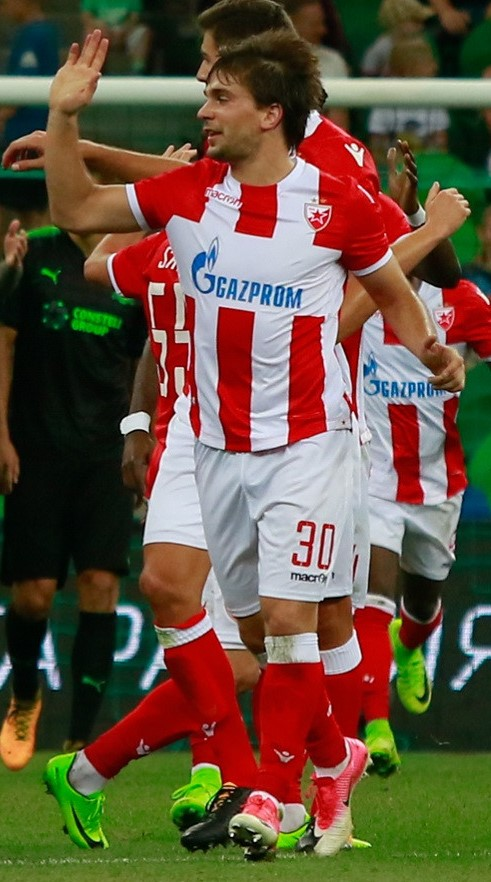
Filip Stojković, Red Star.

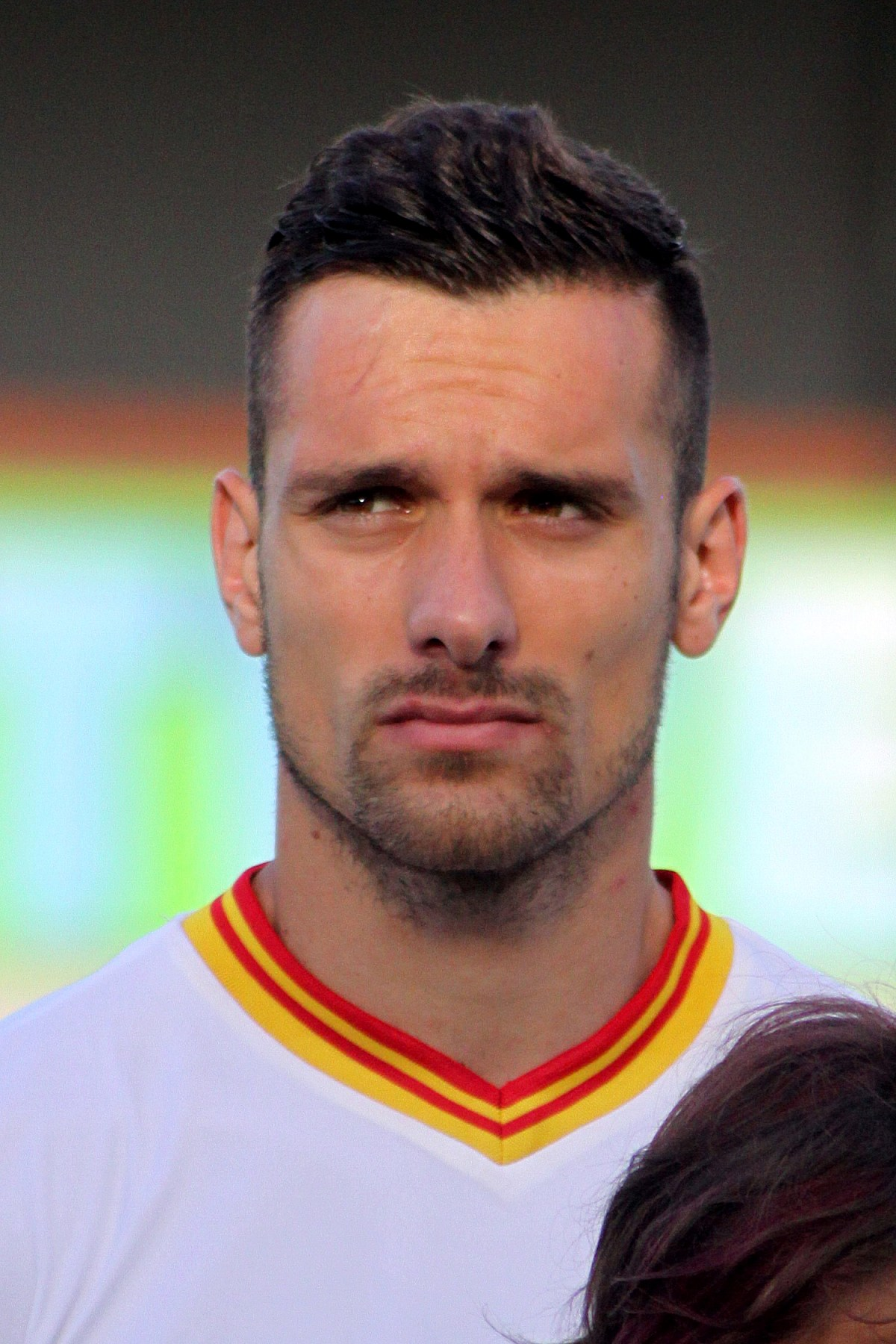
Marko Vešović, Red Star.

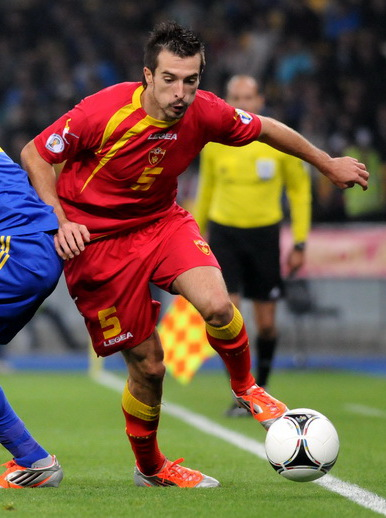
Vladimir Volkov, OFK Beograd, Partizan, Radnički Niš and Rad.

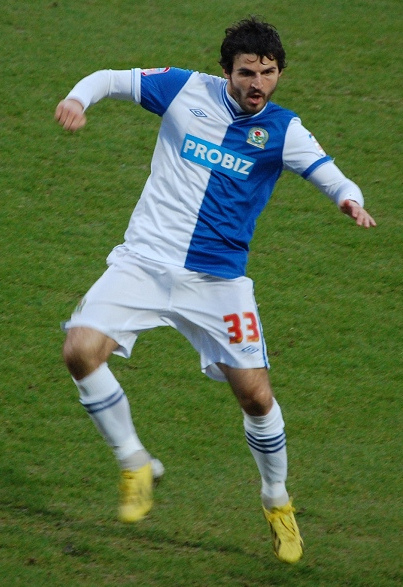
Simon Vukčević, Partizan and Vojvodina.

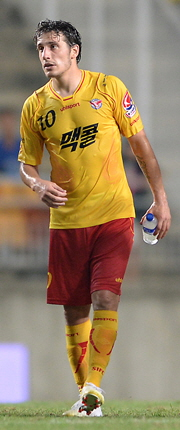
Ivan Vuković, OFK Beograd.

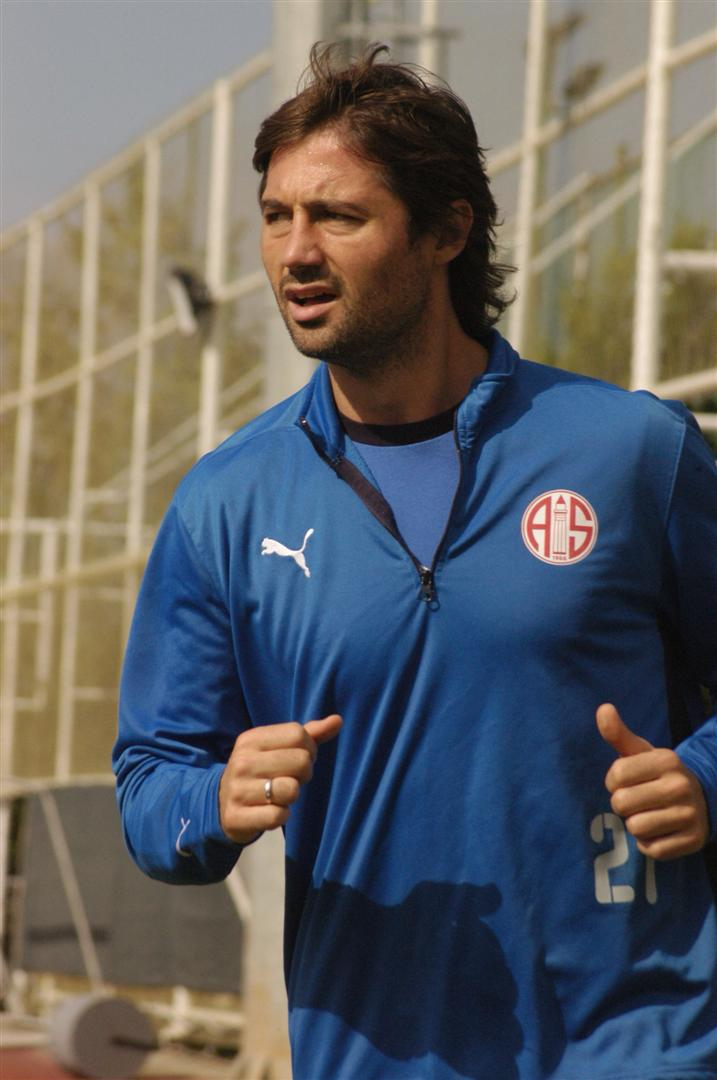
Radoslav Batak, Vojvodina.

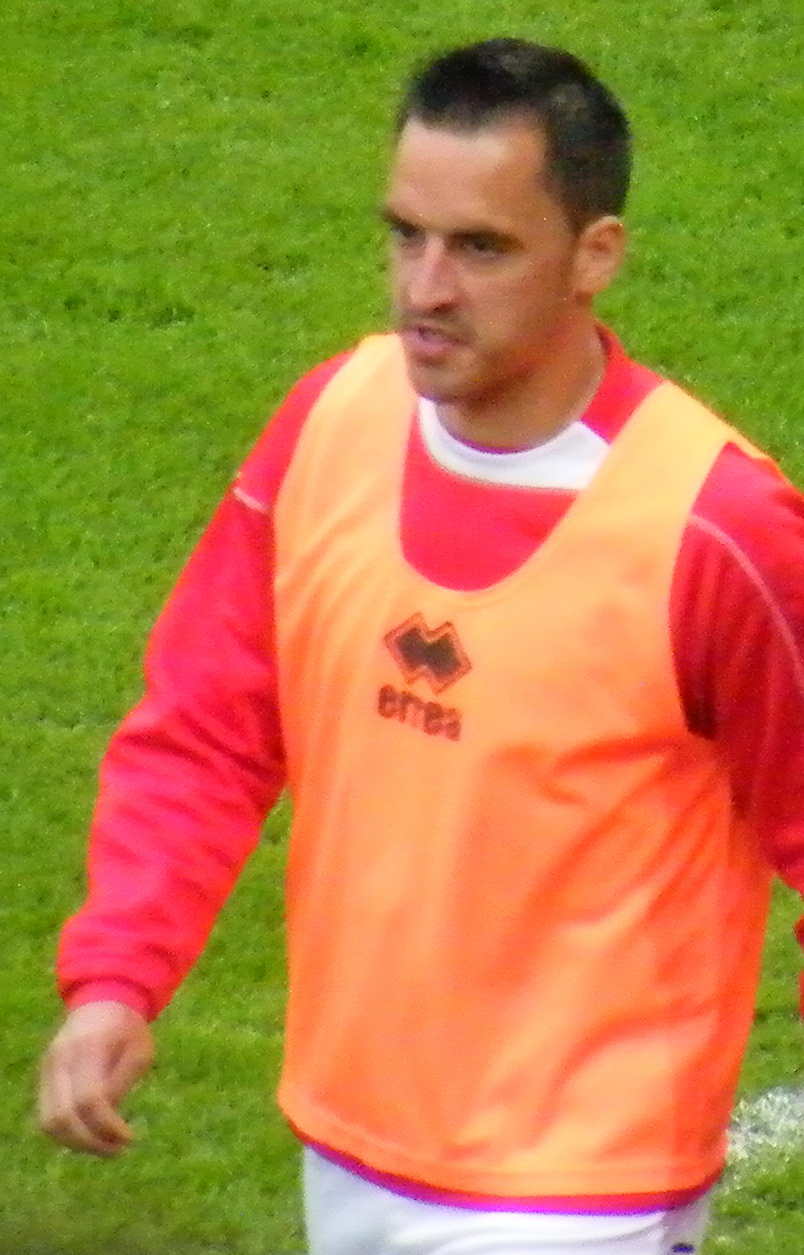
Bojan Brnović, Partizan and Obilić.

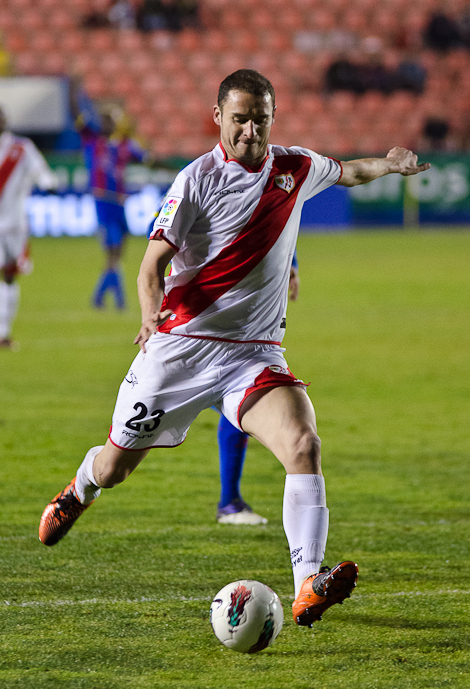
Andrija Delibašić, Partizan.

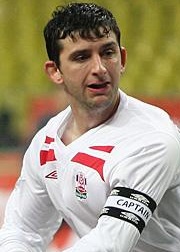
Miodrag Džudović, OFK Beograd.

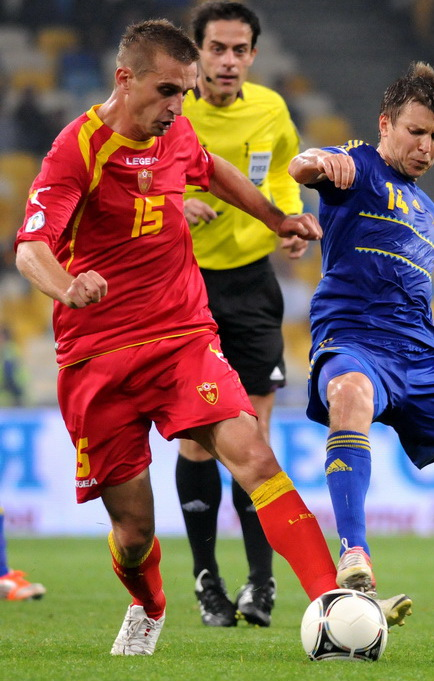
Milorad Peković, OFK Beograd and Partizan.

- Bojan Adžić - Spartak Subotica (2021–2022), **Radnički Kragujevac** (2023–present)
- **Vladan Adžić** – OFK Beograd (2012–2014)
- Aldin Adžović – Borac Čačak (2015–2016)
- Srđan Ajković – Rad Beograd (2009–2012, 2017–2019), BSK Borča (2012–2014)
- Ermin Alić – Spartak Subotica (2015–2016)
- Emir Azemović – Zemun (2018–2019), Kolubara Lazarevac (2022–2023), Novi Pazar (2023–2024)
- Sead Babača – OFK Beograd (2000–2001), Proleter Zrenjanin (2001–2002), Zemun (2005–2007)
- Boban Bajković – Red Star (2003–2004, 2007–2014), Smederevo (2006–2007)
- Blažo Bakrač – Borac Čačak (2011–2012)
- **Miloš Bakrač** – OFK Beograd (2010–2012)
- **Saša Balić** – OFK Beograd (2007–2008)
- Sead Banda – OFK Beograd (2008–2009)
- **Zoran Banović** – Red Star (2004–2008)
- Jovan Baošić – Jagodina (2015–2016)
- Petar Barac – Tekstilac Odžaci (2024–2025), **Železničar Pančevo** (2025–present)
- **Marko Baša** – OFK Beograd (2000–2001, 2002–2005)
- Veljko Batrović – Radnički Niš (2019–2020)
- Dušan Bigović – Rad Beograd (2017–2018)
- Ramazan Bišević – Novi Pazar (2012–2013)
- David Bjelica - Mladost Lučani (2022–2023)
- **Dragan Bogavac** – Red Star (2001–2005), OFK Beograd (2012–2014)
- Ivan Bojović – Čukarički Stankom (2001–2005, 2007–2008), Voždovac (2006–2007)
- Marko Bojović – Napredak Kruševac (2022–2024)
- Dejan Boljević – Smederevo (2011–2012), Novi Pazar (2012–2013), Čukarički (2013–2016), Voždovac (2016–2017)
- Darko Bošković – Mladost Apatin (2004–2008), Spartak Subotica (2008–2011), Bačka Bačka Palanka (2016–2017)
- Ivan Bošković – Vojvodina (2006–2007), Borac Čačak (2007–2008)
- Bojan Božović – Napredak Kruševac (2013–2015), Spartak Subotica (2015–2016)
- **Darko Božović** – Bežanija (2005–2007), Partizan (2007–2010), Sloboda Užice (2010–2012), Voždovac (2014–2015)
- **Mladen Božović** – Partizan (2007–2010)
- **Vladimir Božović** – OFK Beograd (2001–2002, 2003–2007)
- **Miloš Brnović** – Radnički Kragujevac (2021–2023)
- **Nenad Brnović** – Hajduk Kula (1998–1999), Partizan (2004–2009), Rad Beograd (2008–(2009)
- Marko Bugarin - Spartak Subotica (2022–2023)
- Boris Bulajić – Borac Čačak (2015–2016)
- **Darko Bulatović** – Radnički Niš (2014–2016), Čukarički (2016–2017), Voždovac (2017–2018)
- Radosav Bulić – Sartid Smederevo (1998–2001, 2003–2004), Red Star (2001–2002), Radnički Obrenovac (2002–2003), FK Voždovac (2005–2007)
- **Igor Burzanović** – Red Star (2006–2009)
- **Lazar Carević** - Vojvodina (2022–2024)
- Stefan Cicmil – Radnički Niš (2012–2013), Spartak Subotica (2013–2014), Mladost Lučani (2014–2015)
- Jovan Čađenović – Zemun (2017)–2018), Borac Čačak (2017–(2018), Metalac G.M. (2021-2022)
- Nikola Čelebić – BSK Borča (2011–2013)
- **Marko Ćetković** – Partizan (2007–2008)
- Nemanja Ćosović – Donji Srem (2013–2014)
- Mitar Ćuković – Proleter Novi Sad (2017–2019), Napredak Kruševac (2019–2022)
- **Dejan Damjanović** – Železnik (2000–2003), FK Bežanija (2003–2007), Radnički Beograd (2003–2005)
- Dejan Damjanović – Napredak Kruševac (2009)–2010)
- Slavko Damjanović – Spartak Subotica (2012–2013), TSC Bačka Topola (2019–2021), Novi Pazar (2022-2023)
- Danilo Dašić – Zlatibor Čajetina (2019–2020, 2020–(2021), Radnički Niš (2020)–2021), Železničar Pančevo (2021–2024)
- Uroš Delić – Rad Beograd (2005–2011, 2013–2014), Metalac G.M. (2015–2016), Borac Čačak (2016–2018)
- Jovan Dašić – Tekstilac Odžaci (2024–2025)
- Stefan Denković – Vojvodina (2013–2014), Spartak Subotica (2018–2021)
- Andrija Dragojević – OFK Beograd (2012–2013)
- **Miloš Dragojević** – OFK Beograd (2014–2015)
- **Nikola Drinčić** – Partizan (2003–2004, 2013–2015), Budućnost Banatski Dvor (2005–2006), Rad Beograd (2016–2017), Čukarički (2017–2018), Radnički Niš (2018–2019), Vojvodina (2019–2021)
- Mišo Dubljanić – Spartak Subotica (2018–2023), Jedinstvo Ub (2023-2025)
- Aleksandar Dubljević – Inđija (2010)–2011)
- Miloš Đalac – Novi Pazar (2010–2012)
- **Radomir Đalović** – Red Star (2000–2001), Železnik (2001–2002)
- Lazar Đokić – Donji Srem (2014–2015), Spartak Subotica (2016–2017), **Dinamo Vranje** (2016–2017, 2018–present), Čukarički (2017–2018)
- Stefan Đorđević – Vojvodina (2016–2017)
- **Uroš Đuranović** – Javor Ivanjica (2015)–2016), Radnički Niš (2020–2021), Kolubara Lazarevac (2021–2022, 2022-2023), Novi Pazar (2024–2025)
- Zoran Đurašković – Mladost Lučani (1999–2002), Železnik (2002–2005), Smederevo (2005–2009)
- **Uroš Đurđević** – Rad Beograd (2011–2014), Partizan (2016–2018)
- Andrej Đurić – Red Star (2020-2022, 2024-2025), Novi Pazar (2024)-2025)
- Vuk Đurić – Hajduk Kula (2010–2011), Sloboda Užice (2011–2012, 2015–2016)
- Duško Đurišić – OFK Beograd (1993–2000), Vojvodina (2009–2010)
- Ljubomir Đurović – Mladost Lučani (2007–2009)
- Nenad Đurović – Inđija (2009–2011)
- **Ivan Fatić** – Vojvodina (2013–2014)
- Denis Fetahović – Javor Ivanjica (2005–2007)
- Marko Filipović – Čukarički Stankom (2009–2010, 2011–2012)
- Savo Gazivoda – Radnik Surdulica (2016–2017), Radnički Niš (2017–2018), Rad Beograd (2020–2021)
- Vladan Giljen – OFK Beograd (2013–2014)
- Nikola Gluščević – Proleter Novi Sad (2020–2021)
- Nemanja Gojačanin – Javor Ivanjica (2013–2015)
- Tigran Goranović – Čukarički (2014–2015)
- **Petar Grbić** – OFK Beograd (2012–2013), Partizan (2013–2016), Radnički Niš (2018–2019)
- Žarko Grbović – Rad Beograd (2017–2018)
- Bojan Grdinić – BSK Borča (2008–2011)
- Boško Guzina – Rad Beograd (2014–2015, 2016–2018)
- Vladimir Ilić – Javor Ivanjica (2006–2010), Jagodina (2010–2015)
- **Mirko Ivanić** – Vojvodina (2013–2016), **Red Star** (2018–present)
- **Igor Ivanović** – OFK Beograd (2012–2014)
- **Branislav Janković** – Čukarički (2015–2017)
- **Marko Janković** – OFK Beograd (2014–2015), Partizan (2016–2019)
- Milan Jelovac - Spartak Subotica (2021-2022)
- **Milan Jovanović** – Mladost Lučani (2001–2002), Železnik (2002–2003), Red Star (2012–2013)
- **Stevan Jovetić** – Partizan (2005–2008)
- **Vladimir Jovović** – Red Star (2015)–2016), OFK Beograd (2015–(2016), Napredak Kruševac (2016)–2017), Spartak Subotica (2016–(2017)
- **Asmir Kajević** – BSK Borča (2008–2012), Čukarički (2016–2022), Vojvodina (2023–2024)
- Miloš Kalezić - Novi Pazar (2021-2022)
- **Vasko Kalezić** – Vojvodina (2017–2018)
- Darko Karadžić – Rad Beograd (2008–2009), Spartak Subotica (2010–2011)
- Nemanja Kartal – Radnički Niš (2016–2017)
- **Filip Kasalica** – OFK Beograd (2004–2007), Hajduk Kula (2007–2011), Sloboda Užice (2011)–2012), Red Star (2011–2014), Napredak Kruševac (2016–2018), Rad Beograd (2018–2020), Radnički Niš (2020–2022)
- **Mladen Kašćelan** – OFK Beograd (2004–2006), Voždovac (2006–2007)
- Petar Kasom – Partizan (1998–2000), Budućnost Banatski Dvor (2002–2006), Smederevo (2006–2008)
- **Ivan Kecojević** – Čukarički Stankom (2009–2010), OFK Beograd (2010–2012)
- Luka Klikovac – Vojvpdina (2014–2015)
- **Damir Kojašević** – Vojvodina (2017–2018), Radnički Niš (2018–2019)
- **Boris Kopitović** – Čukarički (2016–2019), Vojvodina (2021–2022), Javor Ivanjica (2022-2024)
- Žarko Korać – Vojvodina (2007–2009)
- Marko Kordić – Vojvodina (2011–2013, 2013–2017), Napredak Kruševac (2019–2020)
- **Šaleta Kordić** – Vojvodina (2011–2012,2015–2016), Železničar Pančevo (2022–2024)
- **Nebojša Kosović** – Vojvodina (2010–2014), Partizan (2015–2019)
- Andrej Kostić – **Partizan** (2025–present)
- Igor Kostić – Hajduk Kula (2010–2011)
- Danko Kovačević – Čukarički Stankom (2010–2012)
- Ljubomir Kovačević – Zemun (2018–2019), Rad Beograd (2019–2021)
- Miloš Kovačević – Hajduk Kula (2008–2013)
- Slaven Kovačević – Zemun (2004–2007)
- Nedjeljko Kovinić – Radnički Kragujevac (2021–2022)
- **Ivica Kralj** – Partizan (1995–1998, 2000–2001, 2003–2007)
- **Miloš Krkotić** – Metalac G.M. (2016–2017)
- **Nikola Krstović** – Red Star (2019–2021)
- Alija Krnić – Javor Ivanjica (2017–2021)
- Filip Kukuličić – Zemun (2018–2019)
- **Dušan Lagator** – Čukarički (2015–2018)
- **Risto Lakić** – Partizan (2007–2008), Vojvodina (2008–2010)
- Blažo Lalević – Hajduk Kula (2004–2005, 2006–2008, 2009–2011)
- Igor Lambulić – BSK Borča (2011–2012)
- Uroš Leković – BSK Borča (2012–2013)
- **Stefan Lončar** – Rad Beograd (2016–2017), Novi Pazar (2021–2023)
- Stefan Lukačević – Metalac G.M. (2015–2017)
- Bojan Magud – Zemun (2015–2018)
- Luka Malešević – Radnik Surdulica (2021–2022)
- **Staniša Mandić** – Čukarički (2013–2017), Metalac G.M. (2021-2022)
- Ivan Maraš – Hajduk Kula (2008–2011)
- Stevan Marković – OFK Beograd (2010–2012)
- Rastko Marsenić – TSC Bačka Topola (2021–2022)
- **Ilija Martinović** – Spartak Subotica (2023–2024)
- Vuk Martinović – OFK Beograd (2015–2016)
- **Adam Marušić** – Voždovac (2010–2014)
- Aleksa Marušić - Mladost GAT (2022–2023)
- Luka Merdović – OFK Beograd (2010–2011), Metalac G.M. (2014–2016), Radnik Surdulica (2016–2017)
- Milan Mešter – Hajduk Kula (2001–2003), Zemun (2003–2004, 2005–2007)
- Čedomir Mijanović – Zemun (2004–2007)
- **Milan Mijatović** – Železničar Pančevo (2023–2024)
- **Nemanja Mijušković** – OFK Beograd (2009–2010)
- Kostadin Mikić – Čukarički (2015–2016)
- Stefan Milić – **Partizan** (2025–present)
- Mirko Milikić – Inđija (2020–2021), **Železničar Pančevo** (2022–present)
- Maksim Milović – Voždovac (2017–2018), Mladost Lučani (2019–2023)
- **Miloš Milović** – Voždovac (2020~2023)
- Dimitrije Minić - **Spartak Subotica** (2025–present)
- Filip Mitrović – Bačka Bačka Palanka (2020–2021)
- Miloš Mrvaljević – OFK Beograd (2006–2009, 2009–(2010), 2010–2012), Hajduk Kula (2008–(2009)
- Marko Mugoša – Borac Čačak (2007–2009, 2011–2014), Red Star (2009–2010), Jagodina (2010–2011), Novi Pazar (2011)–2012)
- Bojica Nikčević – **Čukarički** (2018–2019, 2023–present), Novi Pazar (2020–2023)
- Baćo Nikolić – Borac Čačak (2013–2015)
- Jovan Nikolić – Rad Beograd (2010–2011), Hajduk Kula (2011–2012)
- **Nemanja Nikolić** – Red Star (2008–2010), Spartak Subotica (2010–2011), OFK Beograd (2011–2013), Voždovac (2016–2020), Kolubara Lazarevac (2021–2024)
- Srđan Nikolić – Obilić (2005–2009)
- Stefan Nikolić – OFK Beograd (2007–2008), Radnik Surdulica (2016–2017, 2018–2019), Napredak Kruševac (2017–2018)
- Milko Novaković – Banat Zrenjanin (2007–2008), Vojvodina (2010–2011, 2013–2016), Javor Ivanjica (2011–2013), BSK Borča (2012–(2013)
- **Mitar Novaković** – Čukarički Stankom (2001–2003), Železnik (2003–2005), Rad Beograd (2005–2006), OFK Beograd (2006–2008, 2013–2014)
- Marko Obradović - Spartak Subotica (2022–2023), Novi Pazar (2023–2024), Napredak Kruševac (2024–2025)
- **Dejan Ognjanović** – Partizan (2001–2004), FK Obilić (2005–2006), Smederevo (2009–2011, 2012–2013)
- Petar Orlandić – Red Star (2014–2017)
- Nemanja Ostojić – Radnički Niš (2012–2013)
- **Savo Pavićević** – Hajduk Kula (1999–2008), Vojvodina (2007–(2008), Red Star (2013–2016), Spartak Subotica (2016–2017)
- Vojin Pavlović – Inđija (2019–2020)
- Balša Peličić – Donji Srem (2014–2015)
- Mihailo Perović – Voždovac (2017–2018)
- Periša Pešukić – Partizan (2019–2020), Novi Pazar (2020–2023)
- Igor Petković – Mladost Apatin (2001–2002), Čukarički Stankom (2007–2008)
- Luka Petričević – Jagodina (2012–2014)
- **Rade Petrović** – Borac Čačak (2006–2008)
- Igor Poček – Zlatibor Čajetina (2020–2021)
- Dragoslav Poleksić – Hajduk Kula (1995–1996), Radnički Obrenovac (2003–2004), Radnički Beograd (2004–2006), Inđija (2007–2011)
- **Balša Popović** - Kolubara Lazarevac (2021–2023), **OFK Beograd** (2023–present)
- Nikola Popović – Spartak Subotica (2017–2018)
- Stefan Popović – Novi Pazar (2024-2025)
- **Milan Purović** – Red Star (2005–2007), OFK Beograd (2011–2012), Spartak Subotica (2016–2017), Radnik Surdulica (2017–2018)
- Dejan Račić – Voždovac (2015–2017)
- Miloš Radanović – Budućnost Banatski Dvor/Banat Zrenjanin (2004–2006), Smederevo (2007–2008)
- Vasilije Radenović – BSK Borča (2012–2013, 2016–2017), Proleter Novi Sad (2017–2019)
- Nikola Radojičić – Smederevo (2012–2013)
- Dragoljub Radoman - Mladost GAT (2022–2023)
- **Srđan Radonjić** – Partizan (2003–2007)
- Aleksandar Radović – BSK Borča (2011–2012)
- Igor Radović – Milicionar Beograd (2000–2001), OFK Beograd (2001–2004), Hajduk Beograd (2004–2005), Hajduk Kula (2005–2006), Vojvodina (2006–2007)
- Ilija Radović – Vojvodina (2007–(2008), Spartak Subotica (2013–2015), Napredak Kruševac (2014–(2015)
- **Andrija Radulović** - Red Star (2020-2021), Mladost GAT (2022)-2023), Radnik Surdulica (2022-2023), Vojvodina (2023–2025)
- Danilo Radulović – Borac Čačak (2009–(2010)
- Miloš Radulović – Napredak Kruševac (2014–2015)
- Pavle Radulović - Voždovac (2020-2022)
- **Risto Radunović** – Borac Čačak (2014–2015)
- Milivoje Raičević – OFK Beograd (2011–2012)
- **Marko Rakonjac** – Čukarički (2016–2019,2020–2022), Red Star (2022–2023), TSC Bačka Topola (2023–2024)
- Momčilo Rašo – Radnički Kragujevac (2021–2022)
- Stevan Reljić – Red Star (2009–2011, 2012–2013), Borac Čačak (2011–2012)
- **Vladimir Rodić** – Rad Beograd (2012–2015, 2016–2017)
- Bojan Roganović – Čukarički (2021–2023)
- Milan Roganović – **Partizan** (2024–present)
- **Slobodan Rubežić** – Čukarički (2018–2019, 2020–2021), Novi Pazar (2019–2020, 2021–2023, 2024–2025)
- Anđelo Rudović – Spartak Subotica (2017–2018)
- **Niša Saveljić** – Hajduk Kula (1993–1994), Partizan (1994–1997, 2000–(2001), 2005–2007)
- **Stefan Savić** – BSK Borča (2008–2010), Partizan (2010–2011)
- Vladan Savić – Mladost Apatin (2000–2003), Voždovac (2006–2007)
- **Vukan Savićević** – Red Star (2012–2015), **Vojvodina** (2023–present)
- **Nemanja Sekulić** – Vojvodina (2012–2013)
- Radislav Sekulić – Čukarički (2013–2014)
- **Marko Simić** – Jagodina (2010–2011)
- Đorđije Spahić – Bačka Bačka Palanka (2017–2018)
- Marko Stanovčić – Smederevo (2012–2013)
- Slaven Stjepanović – Partizan (2007–2008), Vojvodina (2008–2010)
- **Filip Stojković** – Red Star (2011–2012, 2017–2019), Čukarički (2012–2016)
- **Aleksandar Šćekić** – Partizan (2018–2022, 2023–2025)
- Nemanja Ščekić – Čukarički Stankom (2009–2011), Javor Ivanjica (2017–2018), Zemun (2018–2019)
- **Nikola Šipčić** - Rad Beograd (2016-2020)
- **Aleksandar Šofranac** – Javor Ivanjica (2013–2015)
- **Jovan Tanasijević** – Vojvodina (1997–2003), Inđija (2010–2011)
- Luka Tiodorović – Smederevo (2012–2013), Radnički Kragujevac (2014–2015)
- **Žarko Tomašević** – Partizan (2012–2013)
- Ognjen Tripković – Tekstilac Odžaci (2024–2025), **IMT** (2025–present)
- **Goran Trobok** – Partizan (1997–2003), Smederevo (2006–2007)
- Ilija Tučević – Rad Beograd (2020–2021)
- **Janko Tumbasević** – Vojvodina (2007–2011, (2013)–2014, 2014–2015), Spartak Subotica (2013–(2014, 2015–2016, 2022–2023), **Mladost Lučani** (2016–2019,2021-2022,2023–present), TSC Bačka Topola (2019–2021)
- Uroš Vemić – Zemun (2006–2007), Jagodina (2008–2009)
- **Marko Vešović** – Red Star (2010–2014)
- Stefan Vico – Rad Beograd (2012–2015, 2016–2019), Javor Ivanjica (2020–2023)
- Marko Vidović – Spartak Subotica (2013–2014), Bačka Bačka Palanka (2016–2017), Rad Beograd (2017–2018)
- **Nedeljko Vlahović** – Radnik Surdulica (2016–2017)
- Nemanja Vlahović – OFK Beograd (2015–2016)
- Bojan Vlaović – Metalac G.M. (2019–2020)
- **Vladimir Volkov** – Radnički Beograd (2004–2005), OFK Beograd (2008–2009), Partizan (2011–2015), Radnički Niš (2016–2017), Rad Beograd (2017–2019)
- Filip Vorotović – Borac Čačak (2017)–2018), Spartak Subotica (2017–(2018)
- Miloš Vračar - **Novi Pazar** (2025–present)
- **Marko Vučić** - Novi Pazar (2022-2023)
- Jovan Vučinić – Smederevo (2011–2012), Jagodina (2013–2014)
- **Igor Vujačić** – Vojvodina (2012–2014), Partizan (2019–2023)
- Vule Vujačić – Rad Beograd (2017–2018)
- Nikola Vujadinović – Javor Ivanjica (2011–2012), Radnički Niš (2021–2022), Čukarički (2022)-2023), Mladost GAT (2022–2023), OFK Beograd (2023–2025)
- Luka Vujanović – Vojvodina (2017–2018)
- Nikša Vujanović – Spartak Subotica (2019–2021), Voždovac (2022–2024)
- **Nikola Vujnović** – Rad Beograd (2014–2015), Voždovac (2020–2022)
- Miladin Vujošević – Jagodina (2014–2015)
- Branko Vujović – Javor Ivanjica (2008–2009), Metalac G.M. (2009–2010)
- **Goran Vujović** – Banat Zrenjanin (2006–2008)
- **Nikola Vujović** – Partizan (2008–2009)
- Predrag Vujović – Napredak Kruševac (2001–2005, 2007–2010), FK Vojvodina (2006)–2007), Borac Čačak (2006–(2007)
- Marko Vukasović – Vojvodina (2016–2018)
- Mladen Vukasović – Radnik Surdulica (2016–2017)
- **Andrija Vukčević** – Spartak Subotica (2017–2019)
- Ivan Vukčević – Vojvodina (2021–2023)
- **Marko Vukčević** – Vojvodina (2015–2016)
- **Milan Vukotić** – **Partizan** (2024–present)
- **Simon Vukčević** – Partizan (2002–2006), Vojvodina (2013–2014)
- Rade Vukotić – OFK Beograd (2001–2002, 2003–2005), Borac Čačak (2005–2006), Bežanija (2007–2008)
- **Ivan Vuković** – OFK Beograd (2014–2015)
- Novak Vuković – Voždovac (2018–2020)
- Milan Vušurović – Napredak Kruševac (2019–2020)
- Dejan Zarubica – OFK Beograd (2013–2015)
- Miloš Zečević - Kolubara Lazarevac (2021–2022)
- Bojan Zogović – Metalac G.M. (2014–2016, 2017–(2018), Novi Pazar (2016)–2017, 2023–2024), Radnički Niš (2016–2017), Rad Beograd (2017)–2018), Bačka Bačka Palanka (2018–2019)
- Stefan Zogović – Vojvodina (2009–2010), Donji Srem (2013–2014)
- Igor Zonjić – Mladost Lučani (2013–2015), Rad Beograd (2017–2018)
- **Darko Zorić** – Borac Čačak (2015–2016), Čukarički (2016–2019)
- Nikola Zvrko – Mladost Lučani (2016–2018), Bačka Bačka Palanka (2017–(2018)
- Gojko Žižić – Čukarički Stankom (2010–2011), Metalac G.M. (2011–2012)

Montenegrin internationals that only played in Serbian top league clubs before Montenegrin independence.

- **Radoslav Batak** – Vojvodina (1997–1998, 1999–2003)
- **Branko Bošković** – Red Star (1998–2004)
- **Bojan Brnović** – Partizan (2003–2005), Obilić (2004–(2005)
- **Đorđije Ćetković** – Čukarički Stankom (2002–2003), Železnik/Voždovac (2003–2006)
- **Andrija Delibašić** – Partizan (1999–2004)
- **Miodrag Džudović** – OFK Beograd (2002–2004)
- **Vladimir Gluščević** – Borac Čačak (2004–2005), Rad Beograd (2005–2006)
- **Milorad Peković** – OFK Beograd (1994–1999, 2001–2002), Partizan (1999–2001)
- **Mirko Raičević** – Obilić (2002–2003)

== Namibia ==
- **Rudolf Bester** – Čukarički Stankom (2007–2009)
- **Eliphas Shivute** – Čukarički Stankom (2001–2002)
- **Hendrik Somaeb** – Zemun (2018–2019)

== Netherlands ==
- Rodney Antwi – Novi Pazar (2024–2025)
- Mitchell Donald – Red Star (2015–2018)
- Lorenzo Ebecilio – Red Star (2018–2019)
- Jay Enem – OFK Beograd (2025), **Red Star** (2026-present)
- Serginho Greene – Vojvodina (2012–2013)
- Aleksandar Janković – Radnički Kragujevac (2014–2015)
- Vieiri Kotzebue – **Novi Pazar** (2026-present)
- Rajiv van La Parra – Red Star (2019–2020)
- Queensy Menig – Partizan (2021–2024)
- Mink Peeters – Čukarički (2019–2020)
- Tayrell Wouter – **OFK Beograd** (2026-present)

== New Zealand ==
- **Adam Mitchell** – Red Star (2016)–2017)
- **Sarpreet Singh** - TSC Bačka Topola (2025)–2026
- **Marko Stamenić** – Red Star (2023–2024)

== Niger ==
- **Mamane Amadou Sabo** – **Javor Ivanjica** (2025–present)

== Nigeria ==
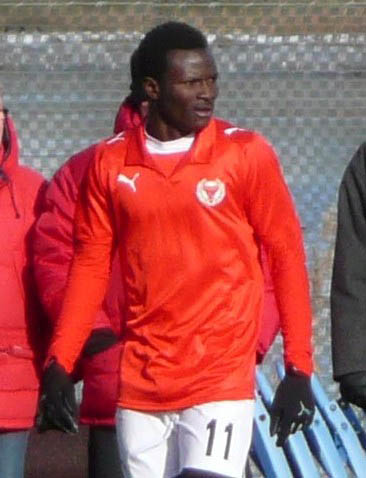
Abiola Dauda, Red Star

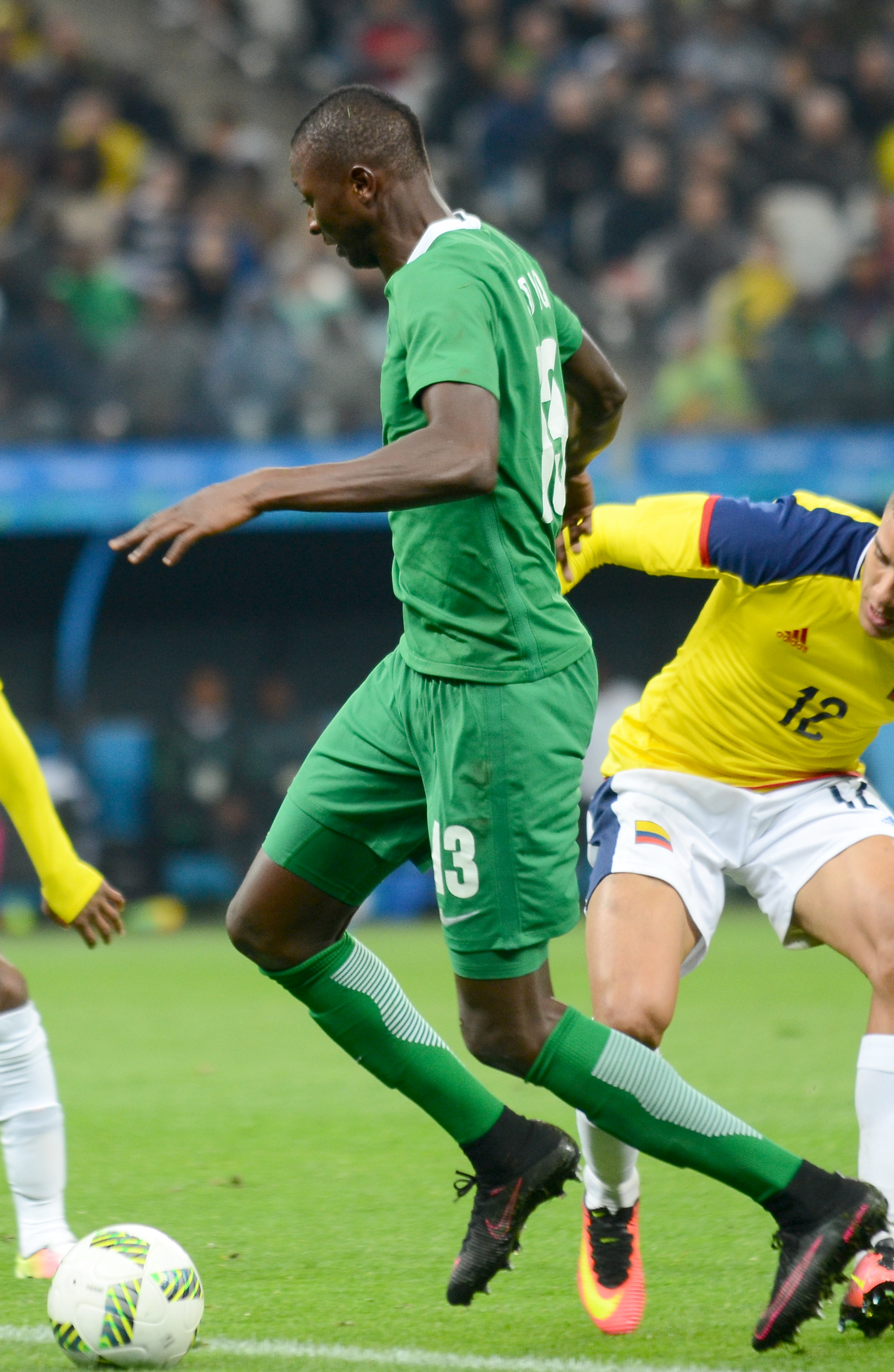
Umar Sadiq, bronze medalist at the 2016 Olympics, was brought by Partizan in 2019.

- Mustapha Abiodun – IMT Beograd (2023–2024), **Tekstilac Odžaci** (2024–present)
- Adetunji Adeshina – Novi Pazar (2022–2025)
- **Sunday Adetunji** – Čukarički (2023–2024)
- Abiodun Dayo Adeyoriju – Borac Čačak (2009–2010)
- Emmanuel Adimchukwunobi – **IMT Beograd** (2023–present)
- Uche Agbo – Rad Beograd (199_–199_), Obilić (1995–1997)
- Victor Agbo – Jagodina (2010–2011)
- Kelvin Agho – Voždovac (2023–2024)
- Sampson Agoha – Voždovac (2023–2024)
- Donald Agu – Obilić (1994–1995)
- Nnaemeka Ajuru – Javor Ivanjica (2004–2005, 2006–2009, 2014–2016), Vojvodina (2009–2013), Spartak Subotica (2016–2017)
- **Uche Akubuike** – Hajduk Kula (200_–200_)
- Victor Amos – Mladost Lučani (2018–2020)
- **Kevin Amuneke** – Sloboda Užice (2013–2014)
- **Izuchuckwu Anthony** – Radnički Kragujevac (2023–2024)
- Franklin Ayodele – Mladi Radnik (2009–2010)
- Toheeb Bamigboye – Novi Pazar (2023–2025)
- Shedrack Charles – IMT Beograd (2021–2024)
- Geoffrey Chinedu – Radnički Kragujevac (2022–2024)
- Stephen Chinedu – **Radnički Kragujevac** (2024–present)
- Atule Collins – Spartak Subotica (2023–2025)
- Michael Jaja Dagogo – Novi Pazar (2015–2016)
- Abiola Dauda – Red Star (2012–2014)
- Dele (Bamidele Isa Yusuf) – Radnički Niš (2023–2024), **Vojvodina** (2024–present)
- **Eddy Dombraye** – OFK Beograd (2002–2003)
- Francis Ebuka – **Spartak Subotica** (2023–present)
- John Okoye Ebuka – Novi Pazar (2015–2016)
- Okosi Edhere – Bačka Bačka Palanka (2017–2018)
- Frank Egharevba – Javor Ivanjica (2009–2010)
- **Ifeanyi Emeghara** – Partizan (2004–2006)
- David Ewemade – **Radnički Niš** (2025–present)
- Patrick Friday Eze – Rad Beograd (2013)–2014), Napredak Kruševac (2013–(2014), Mladost Lučani (2014–2015, 2023–2025)
- Francis Ezeh – Železničar Pančevo (2024–2025)
- Ikechukwu Ezeh – Napredak Kruševac (2009–2010)
- Bassey Howells – Spartak Subotica (2018–2019)
- Anthony Agha Ibiam – Javor Ivanjica (2008–2009)
- Timothy Idogbe – Napredak Kruševac (2009–2010)
- Ifeanyi Igbodo – Javor Ivanjica (2002–2004, 2007–2008)
- Samson Iyede – **Novi Pazar** (2025–present)
- Victor Jideonwor – Javor Ivanjica (2005–2008)
- Moses John – Zemun (2018–2019)
- Timileyin Joseph – **Železničar Pančevo** (2024–present)
- Oriyomi Lebi – **IMT Beograd** (2024–present)
- Anthony Lokosa – Železničar Pančevo (2023–2024)
- Adekunle Lukmon – Borac Čačak (2004–2005)
- Oladipupo Martins – Partizan (2002–2003)
- Samuel Nnamani – Jagodina (2014–2015)
- Prince Benjamin Obasi – **OFK Beograd** (2024–present)
- Gabriel Obekpa – IMT Beograd (2022–2024), Mladost Lučani (2024–2025)
- Obiora Odita – Javor Ivanjica (2003–2005, (2006)–2007, (2010)–2011, 2011–2012,2021–2022), Partizan (2005–2007), Voždovac (2014–2016), Mladost Lučani (2016–2021)
- Ugochukwu Oduenyi – Javor Ivanjica (2021–2023)
- Hypolite Emeka Oguegbu – Javor Ivanjica (2010–2011)
- Obele Okeke Onyebuchi – Javor Ivanjica (2002–2003)
- Eze Okeuhie – Vojvodina (2017–2019), Čukarički (2019–2021)
- Samuel Okon – Dinamo Vranje (2018–2019)
- Solomon Oladele – Jagodina (2008–2009)
- **Peter Olayinka** – **Red Star** (2023–present)
- Daniel Olerum – Sloboda Užice (2012–2013)
- Emmanuel Oletu – Spartak Subotica (2008–2010)
- Peter Omoduemuke – Obilić (2004–2007)
- Ibrahim Yusuf Omosanya – **Radnički Kragujevac** (2024–present)
- Ifeanyi Onyilo – Javor Ivanjica (2009–2013), Red Star (2013–2014)
- Ejike Opara – **Novi Pazar** (2023–present)
- Ezequiel Reuben – **Spartak Subotica** (2024–present)
- **Umar Sadiq** – Partizan (2019–2021)
- **Gbolahan Salami** – Red Star (2014–2015)
- Kayode Saliman – **Javor Ivanjica** (2025–present)
- Okomayin Segun Onimisi – Dinamo Vranje (2016–2020)
- Jesse Sekidika – Napredak Kruševac (2015–2018)
- Theophilus Solomon – Partizan (2017–2018)
- Obinna Tochukwu – Javor Ivanjica (2015–2016)
- Thomas Viktor Ude – **Radnički Kragujevac** (2024–present)
- Prince Lucky Ukachukwu – IMT Beograd (2022–2024), Tekstilac Odžaci (2024–2025)
- **Ugo Ukah** – Čukarički (2014–2015)
- Eke Uzoma – Spartak Subotica (2015–2016)
- **Taribo West** – Partizan (2002–2004)
- Ajia Yakub – Novi Pazar (2023–2025)
- Abdul Zubairu – Kolubara Lazarevac (2022–2023)

== North Macedonia ==
Named F.Y.R. Macedonia until 2019. Excluded the players that played before 1992 when Macedonia became independent.

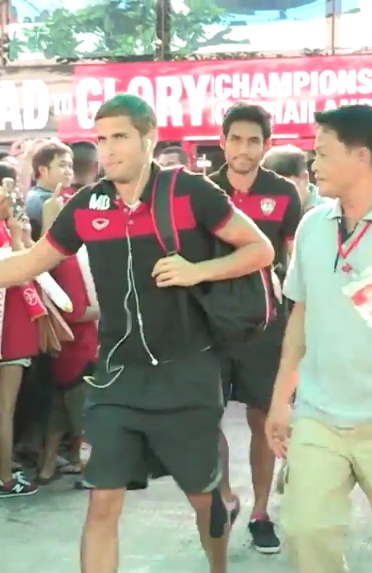
Mario Đurovski, Bežanija and Vojvodina.

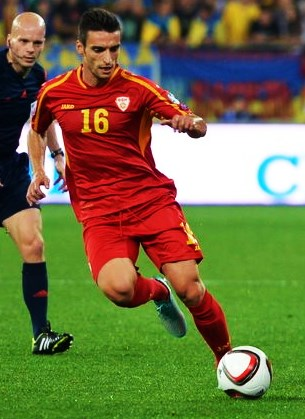
Nikola Gligorov, Bežanija.

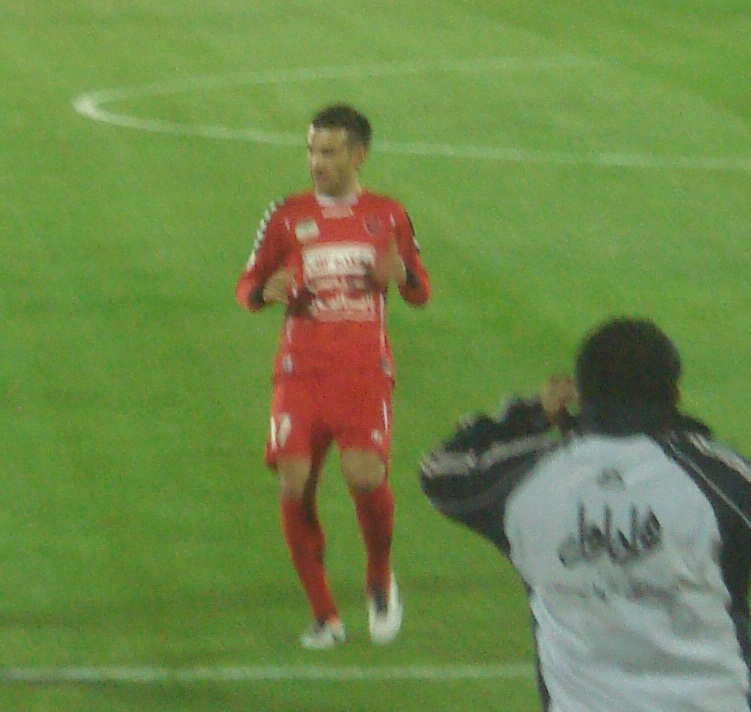
Vlatko Grozdanoski, Vojvodina.

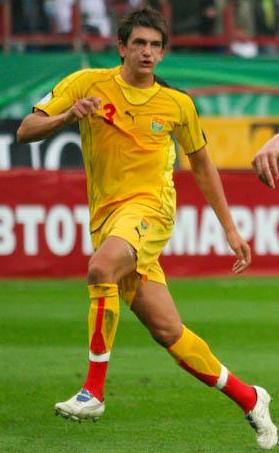
Goran Popov, Red Star.

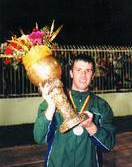
Mitko Stojkovski, Red Star and Macedonian national team standard defender during the 1990s.

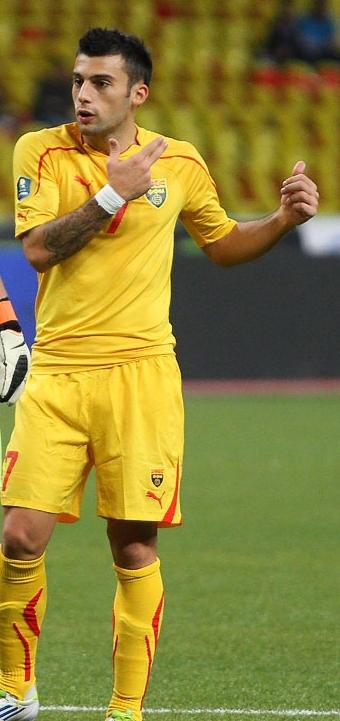
Ivan Tričkovski, Red Star.

- Emil Abaz – Spartak Subotica (2016–2018)
- Marko Alčevski – **OFK Beograd** (2025–present)
- Ivan Aleksovski – Spartak Subotica (2020–2021)
- Fikret Alomerović – Radnički Niš (199_–199_)
- Aleksa Amanović – Javor Ivanjica (2015–2020)
- Stefan Andrić – Radnički Kragujevac (2014–2016)
- **Stefan Aškovski** – Partizan (2012–2013), Donji Srem (2013)–2014), Napredak Kruševac (2013–(2014), Novi Pazar (2015–2016)
- **Daniel Avramovski** – Red Star (2014–2015, 2016–2017), OFK Beograd (2015–2016), Vojvodina (2017–2018)
- **David Babunski** – Red Star (2015–2017)
- **Aleksandar Bajevski** – OFK Beograd (2002–2003), Radnički Niš (2012–2013)
- Goran Bogdanović – Rad Beograd (2012–2013)
- Nikola Bogdanovski – Radnik Surdulica (2019–2022), Novi Pazar (2019-2020, 2022–2024)
- Ivica Cvetanovski – Sloboda Užice (1989–1993, 1993–1996), Napredak Kruševac (1993–1994)
- **Dragan Čadikovski** – Partizan (2007–2009), Radnički Kragujevac (2013–2014)
- Igor Damjanoski – Zvezdara (2001–2002)
- Zoran Danoski – Radnik Surdulica (2018–2021, 2022–2023), Proleter Novi Sad (2021)–2022), Mladost Lučani (2021–2022), Novi Pazar (2022)-2023)
- Olivio Dautovski – Napredak Kruševac (1995–1996)
- Benjamin Demir – Spartak Subotica (2018–2019)
- Erol Demir – Železnik (1997–1998)
- **Filip Despotovski** – OFK Beograd (2002–2004)
- **Stefan Despotovski** – **OFK Beograd** (2024–present)
- Andrija Dimeski – **Voždovac** (2023–present)
- **Bojan Dimoski** – Partizan (2024–2025)
- Milan Dimoski – Jastrebac Niš (1991–1994)
- Aleksandar Donev– Bežanija (2006–2007)
- Hristijan Dragarski – Radnik Surdulica (2015–2016)
- Sasho Dukov – OFK Beograd (2012–2013)
- **Mario Đurovski** – Bežanija (2004–2007), Vojvodina (2007–2011)
- Haris Fakić – OFK Beograd (2002–2005)
- **Antonio Filevski** – Železnik (1998–2000), Obilić 2000–(2001)
- Jane Gavalovski – Rad Beograd (1998–2004), Obilić (2004)–2005)
- Boban Georgiev – Radnik Surdulica (2019–2020)
- Panče Georgievski – Čukarički Stankom (1999–2000)
- **Blaže Georgioski** – Sartid Smederevo (1998–1999), Red Star (1999–2001)
- **Marjan Gerasimovski** – Partizan (1998–2001)
- Bojan Gjorgievski – Mačva Šabac (2017–2018)
- Marko Gjorgjievski – Voždovac (2019–2020)
- Fahrudin Gjurgjević – Spartak Subotica (2011–2013)
- **Nikola Gligorov** – Bežanija (2006–2007)
- **Boban Grnčarov** – OFK Beograd (2000–2003)
- **Vlatko Grozdanoski** – Vojvodina (2007–2010)
- Vasil Gunev – Napredak Kruševac (1988–1990, 1991–1993)
- Destan Haciya – Borac Čačak (2017–2018)
- **Gjorgji Hristov** – Partizan (1994–1997)
- Martin Hristov – Donji Srem (2014–2015)
- **Saša Ilić** – Partizan (1993–1995)
- Harun Isa – Rad Beograd (1989–1991), Priština (1991–1993)
- **Ismail Ismaili** – Priština (199_–199_)
- **Filip Ivanovski** – Javor Ivanjica (2017–2018)
- Nikola Jakimovski – Javor Ivanjica (2011–2013), FK Jagodina (2013–2015)
- Mirsad Jonuz – Rad Beograd (1988)–1989, 1992–1993)
- Aleksa Jordanov – Napredak Kruševac (2020–2021)
- **Nikola Karčev** – Metalac G.M. (2011)–2012)
- **Hristijan Kirovski** – OFK Beograd (2002–2006)
- **Tome Kitanovski** – Voźdovac (2014–2015), Mladost Lučani (2015–2017)
- **Darko Krsteski** – Red Star (1997–1999), Borac Čačak (2004–2007)
- Strahinja Krstevski – Vojvodina (2016–2017), Proleter Novi Sad (2016–2019)
- Petar Krstić – Radnički Niš (2015–2019)
- Blagoja Kuleski – Radnički Niš (1989–1993)
- Stevica Kuzmanovski – Partizan (1982–1983), OFK Beograd (1984–1986, 1990–1991), Rad Beograd (1987–1990, 1997–2000)
- Dimitrija Lazarevski – Zemun (2005–2006)
- **Goran Lazarevski** – Vojvodina (2002–2003), Radnički Obrenovac (2003–2004)
- Nenad Lazarevski – Borac Čačak (2007–2008), OFK Beograd (2009–2010), Inđija (2012–2014)
- **Vlade Lazarevski** – Napredak Kruševac (2001–2006), Smederevo (2012–2013), Radnički Niš (2014–2015)
- **Aleksandar Lazevski** – Partizan (2007–2008, 2010–2013), Rad Beograd (2013–2014), Mladost Lučani (2015–2016)
- Florijan Maksimovski – Hajduk Kula (1997–2000)
- **Borče Manevski** – Banat Zrenjanin (2008–2010)
- Žan Manovski – Rad Beograd (2010–2011)
- Marjan Markoski – Hajduk Kula (1997–2000)
- **Bojan Markovski** – Bežanija (2006–(2007), OFK Beograd (2006–2009)
- **Darko Micevski** – Sloboda Užice (2009–2011), OFK Beograd (2013–2015), Novi Pazar (2015–2017)
- Gorazd Mihailov – Čukarički Stankom (1998–1999)
- **Ljubodrag Milošević** – Radnički Niš (1992–1994)
- **Sašo Miloševski** – Vojvodina (1995–1998)
- **Bojan Miovski** – Zemun (2018–2019)
- **Martin Mirčevski** – TSC Bačka Topola (2021–2024)
- Risto Mitrevski – Donji Srem (2014–2015)
- **Daniel Mojsov** – Vojvodina (2010–2013)
- Gjorgji Mojsov – Metalac G.M. (2011)–2012)
- Ivan Nastevski – Novi Pazar (2015–2016)
- Pavel Nedelkovski – Radnički Niš (2002–2003)
- Matej Nikolov – Zlatibor Čajetina (2020–2021)
- Boban Nikolovski – Obilić (1996–1997), OFK Beograd (1998–1999), Železnik (2000–2002)
- Dragoljub Nikolovski – OFK Beograd (1998–1999)
- Vlada Novevski – **Vojvodina** (2020-2022, 2025–present), Voždovac (2022–2024)
- **Tome Pačovski** – Železnik (2003–(2004)
- Borjan Panchevski – Dinamo Vranje (2018–2019)
- **Angelko Panov** – OFK Beograd (2002–2003)
- Stefan Petkoski Cimbaljević – Jedinstvo Ub (2024–2025), **Radnički Kragujevac** (2025–present)
- Filip Petrov – Javor Ivanjica (2009–2011)
- **Milovan Petrovik** – Radnik Surdulica (2021–2022)
- **Goran Popov** – Red Star (2004–2005)
- Emran Ramadani – Hajduk Kula (2010–2011)
- **Predrag Ranđelović** – Jagodina (2013–2014)
- Filip Ristovski – Javor Ivanjica (2016–2018)
- **Dušan Savić** – Zemun (2017–2019)
- Žanko Savov – Radnički Niš (199_–199_)
- Mirko Simjanovski – Donji Srem (2014–2015)
- **Stefan Spirovski** – Borac Čačak (2009–2014)
- Roberto Stajev – Radnički Niš (2015–2016)
- **Perica Stančeski** – Partizan (2002–2006), Bežanija (2006–2008), Čukarički Stankom (2008–2009), BSK Borča (2012–2013), Rad Beograd (2013–2015)
- **Goran Stanić** – Rad Beograd (2002–2003)
- Luka Stankovski – **Radnički Kragujevac** (2024–present)
- **Vujadin Stanojković** – Partizan (1989–1993)
- **Ostoja Stjepanović** – Partizan (2005–2006), Čukarički Stankom (2007–2009), OFK Beograd (2015–2016), Rad Beograd (2019–2020)
- Nikola Stojanov – Javor Ivanjica (2016–2017)
- Nikola Stojanović – Radnik Surdulica (2008–2009, 2010–2016)
- **Milan Stojanovski** – Proleter Zrenjanin (1993–1997), Partizan (1997–2000, 2001–2004), Banat Zrenjanin (2008–2009)
- **Aco Stojkov** – Partizan (2006–2007)
- Dragan Stojkov – Napredak Kruševac (2009–2010), Jagodina (2010–2014)
- **Mitko Stojkovski** – Red Star (1991–1995)
- Gjorgji Tanušev – Sloboda Užice (2010–2011), BSK Borča (2011–2012)
- **Todor Todoroski** – Radnički Niš (2021–2022)
- Zoran Todorov – Smederevo (2009–2012)
- **Aleksandar Todorovski** – Radnički Beograd (2002–2005), Rad Beograd (2008–2011), Radnički Niš (2018–2020)
- **Zlatko Todorovski** – OFK Beograd (1999–2000)
- **Borislav Tomovski** – Vojvodina (1990–1995)
- Miloš Tošeski – Zemun (2018–2020), Spartak Subotica (2021–2024), **Napredak Kruševac** (2024–present)
- Nikola Tošeski – Proleter Novi Sad (2017–2019)
- **Viktor Trenevski** – Partizan (1995–1998)
- **Ivan Tričkovski** – Red Star (2007–2009)

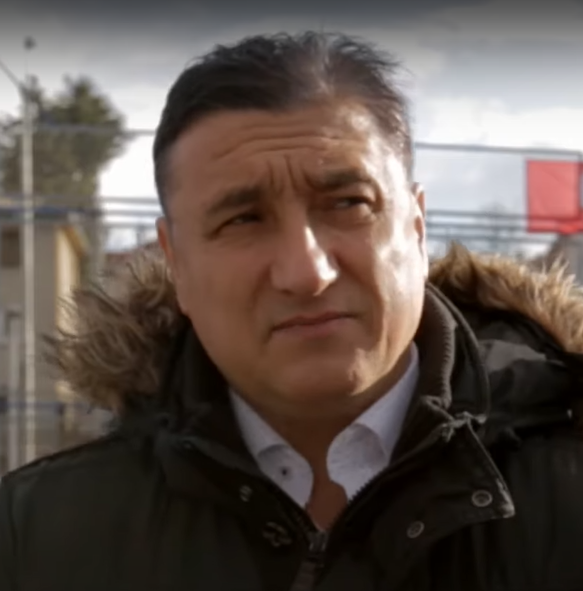
Darko Pančev, Red Star European Cup winner and 1991 Ballon d'Or.

Macedonian internationals that played in Serbian top league clubs only during Yugoslav period:

- **Boško Đurovski** – Red Star (1978–1989)
- **Milko Đurovski** – Red Star (1980–1986), Partizan (1986–1990)
- **Dejvi Glavevski** – Rad Beograd (1990–1992)
- **Dragan Kanatlarovski** – Red Star (1989–1990)
- **Blagoja Milevski** – Red Star (1990–1991)
- **Ilija Najdoski** – Red Star (1988–1992)
- **Darko Pančev** – Red Star (1988–1992)

== Norway ==
- Julian Kristoffersen – Jedinstvo Ub (2024–2025)
- Moussa Njie – Partizan (2018–2019)
- **Ohi Omoijuanfo** – Red Star (2021–2022)
- **Ghayas Zahid** – **Partizan** (2023–present)

== Pakistan ==
- **Mohammad Fazal** – IMT Beograd (2024–2025)

== Palestine ==
- **Javier Cohene** – Borac Čačak (2014–2015) – ( (Paraguay) when active)

== Panama ==
- **José Luis Rodríguez** (Puma) – Red Star (2024–2025)

== Peru ==
- **Miguel Araujo** – Red Star (2013–2014)
- **Joao Grimaldo** – Partizan (2024–2025)
- Rodrigo Vilca – Voždovac (2023–2024)

== Philippines ==
- **Diego Bardanca** – Inđija (2019–2020) – ( (Spain) when active)

== Poland ==
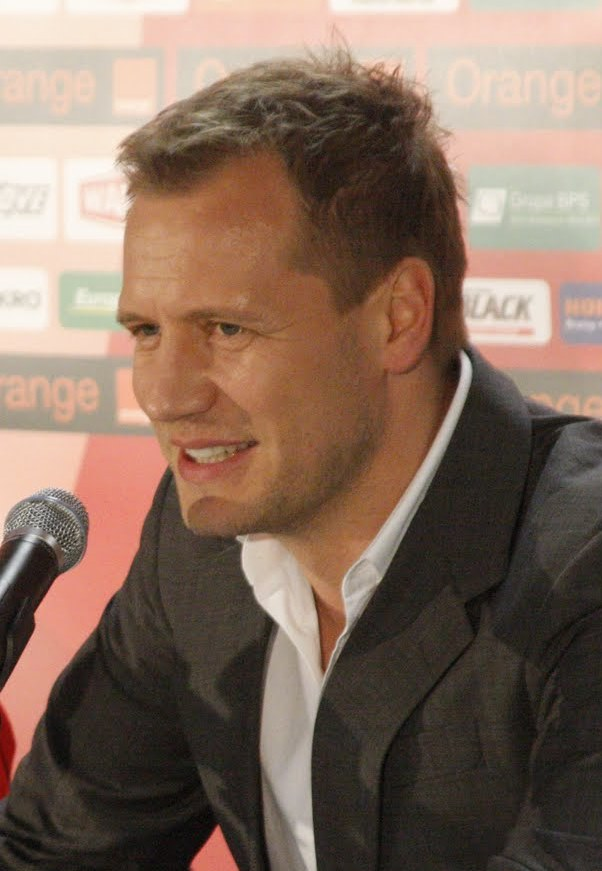
Tomasz Rząsa played with Partizan in the Champions League.

- **Grzegorz Bronowicki** – Red Star (2007–2009)
- Jeremiah Dąbrowski – Mladost Lučani (2014–2015)
- **Tomasz Rząsa** – Partizan (2003–2004)
- Franciszek Sikora – BSK Belgrade (1924–1925)
- Radoslaw Wypart – IMT (2024–2025)

== Portugal ==
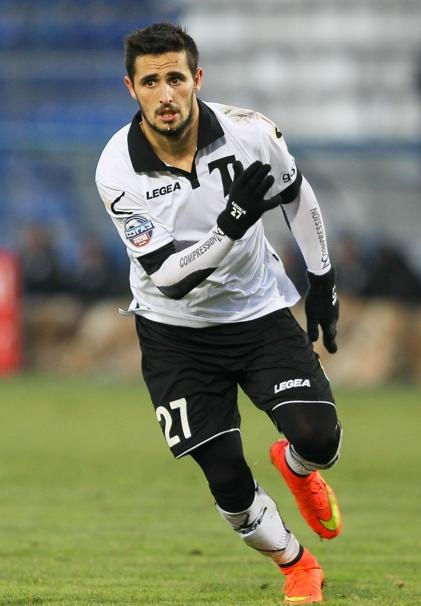
Hugo Vieira, Red Star.

- Andrezinho – Spartak Subotica (2019–2020)
- Alfa Baldé – **Radnički Kragujevac** (2024–present)
- Bubacar Djaló – **Radnički Niš** (2025–present)
- Rafael Floro – Novi Pazar (2023–2024)
- João Lucas – Red Star (2007–2008)
- Nuno Pereira – Mladost Lučani (2023–2024)
- Marcelo Santiago – Jagodina (2012–2013)
- Tomané – Red Star (2019–2020)
- Hugo Vieira – Red Star (2015–2017)
- Xavi – Banat Zrenjanin (2008–2009)

== Romania ==
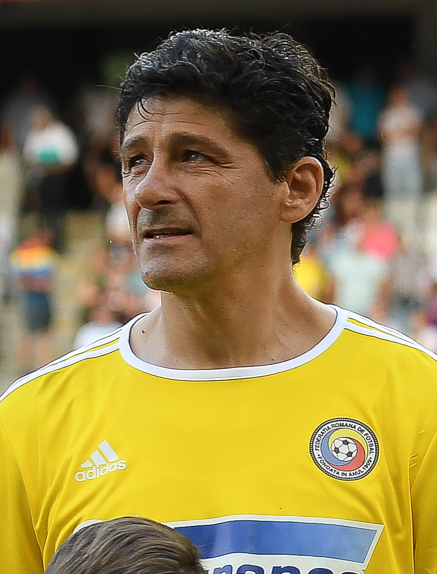
One of the best defenders of his time, after winning the Champions League with FCSB he was brought by Red Star and win it again, becoming one of the rare players to win the CL with two different teams..

- Barna Antal – TSC Bačka Topola (2019–2020)
- Radu Banc – Proleter Zrenjanin (1971–1974)
- **Miodrag Belodedici** – Red Star (1989–1992)
- Mihai Butean – **Vojvodina** (2024–present)
- Ioan Răzvan Chiriţă – Radnički Kragujevac (2000–2002)
- **Gabriel Enache** – Partizan (2018–2019)
- Aurel Han – Spartak Subotica (1991–1992)
- Jozef Kezdi – Jedinstvo Beograd (1937–1938)
- Gabi Kovács – Juda Makabi (1929–1930)
- Dezideriu Laki – BSK Beograd (1924–1925)
- Teodor Mogin – Vojvodina (1924–1925)
- Cristian Muscalu – Borac Čačak (2010–2011), Voždovac (2013–2014)
- **Constantin Nica** – Vojvodina (2019–2020)
- Marinel Pascu – OFK Beograd (2001–2002)
- Vasile Păunescu – 14. Oktobar Niš (1946–1947)
- Branimir Pavlov – OFK Kikinda (1992–1993)
- Iulian Popan – Juda Makabi (1923–1924)
- Virgil Popescu – Vojvodina (1938–1941), Partizan (1946–1948)
- **Svetozar Popović** – BSK Beograd (1920–1925) – ( (Kingdom of Yugoslavia) when active)
- **Iosif Rotariu** – OFK Kikinda (1995–1996)
- Marius Sasu – Vojvodina (1997–1998)
- **Alin Stoica** – Vojvodina (2009–2010)
- **Sorin Vlaicu** – Red Star (1992–1993)
- **Rudolf Wetzer** – BSK Beograd (1924–1925)

== Russia ==
Including the period of Soviet Union.

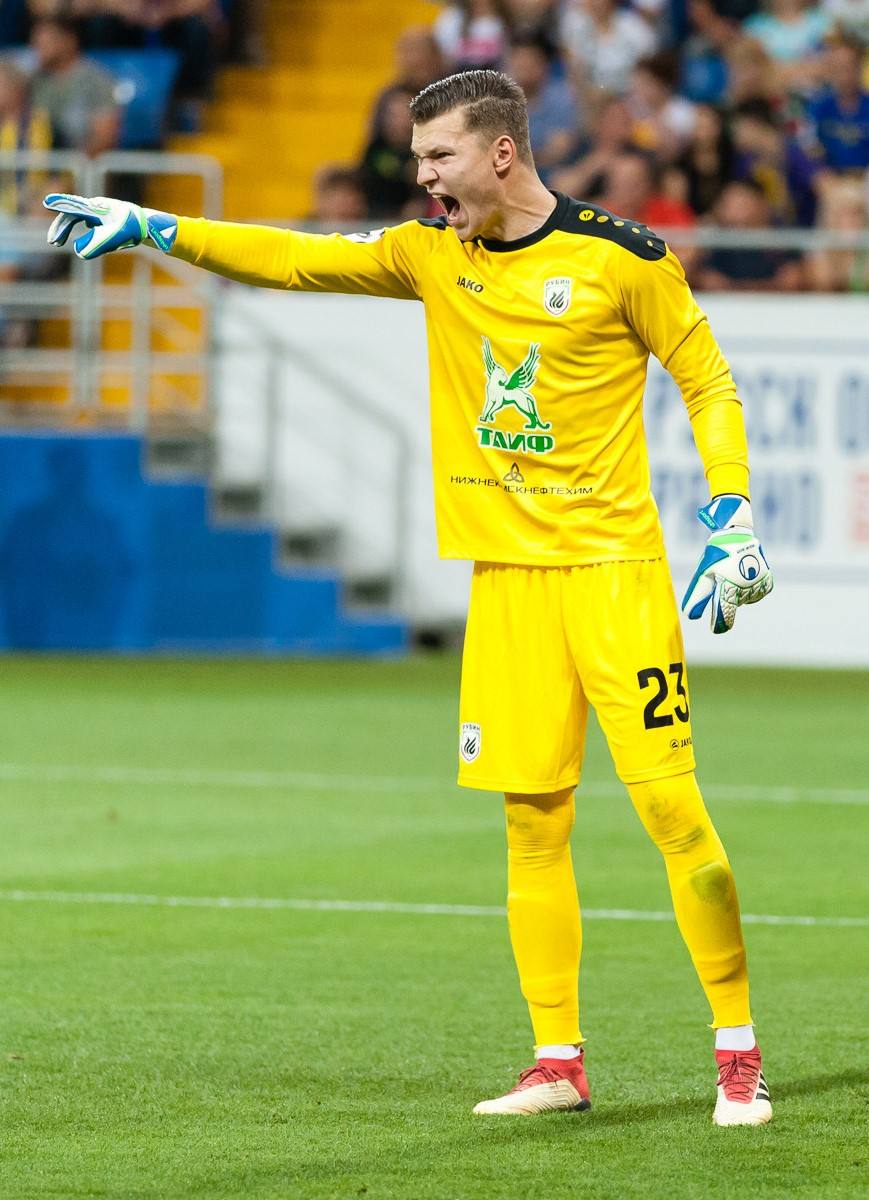
Konovalov, spent couple of seasons in Serbia.

- Aleksandr Azzam – Tekstilac Odžaci (2024–2025)
- Leonid Bayer – BASK Beograd (1940–1942) – ( (Soviet Union) when active)
- Georgiy Bratukhin – Voždovac (2019–2021)
- Daniil Chalov – Inđija (2020–2021)
- Tamirlan Dzhamalutdinov – Novi Pazar (2021–2022)
- Asteri Filaktov – OFK Beograd (1963–1964) – ( (Soviet Union) when active)
- Ivan Ignatyev – Železničar Pančevo (2023–2024)
- Ramazan Isayev – Radnički Niš (2016–2017)
- Juraj Jurak – Partizan (1946–1947) – ( (Soviet Union) when active)
- Ivan Konovalov – Radnički Niš (2015–2016), Bačka Bačka Palanka (2016–2017)
- Uchuk Kuldinov – Jedinstvo Beograd (193_–1933), Jugoslavija (1933–1937) – ( (Soviet Union) when active)
- Daur Kvekveskiri – Napredak Kruševac (2016–2017)
- Shabat Logua – Bačka Bačka Palanka (2019–2020), Zlatibor Čajetina (2020–2021)
- Maksim Maksimov – Napredak Kruševac (2020)–2021)
- Matvey Martinkevich – Vojvodina (2020–2021), Radnik Surdulica (2023–2024)
- Maksim Martusevich – Javor Ivanjica (2015–2016)
- Ladislav Polikan – NAK Novi Sad (1924–1925) – ( (Soviet Union) when active)
- Yegor Prutsev – **Red Star** (2022–2023, 2024–present)
- Anton Pushin – Jugoslavija (1936–1937) – ( (Soviet Union) when active)
- Artur Sagitov – Radnički Niš (2021–(2022)
- Schegolev – RFK Novi Sad (1962–1963) – ( (Soviet Union) when active)
- Semen Sheptitskiy – Rad Beograd (2017–2019)
- Georgiy Shishlov – Mačva Šabac (1924–1925) – ( (Soviet Union) when active)
- Nikolay Simeonov – Vojvodina (1923–1924) – ( (Soviet Union) when active)
- Andrey Sorokin – Spartak Subotica (2020–2021)
- Vsevolod Stashevskiy – BSK Beograd (1924–1925) – ( (Soviet Union) when active)
- Sergey Vitvinskiy – Vojvodina (1922–1924) – ( (Soviet Union) when active)
- Vladislav Yefimov – Sartid Smederevo (1999–2001)

== Scotland ==
- Islam Feruz – Radnički Niš (2023–2024)
- Jamie McCluskey – Partizan (2008-2009)

== Senegal ==
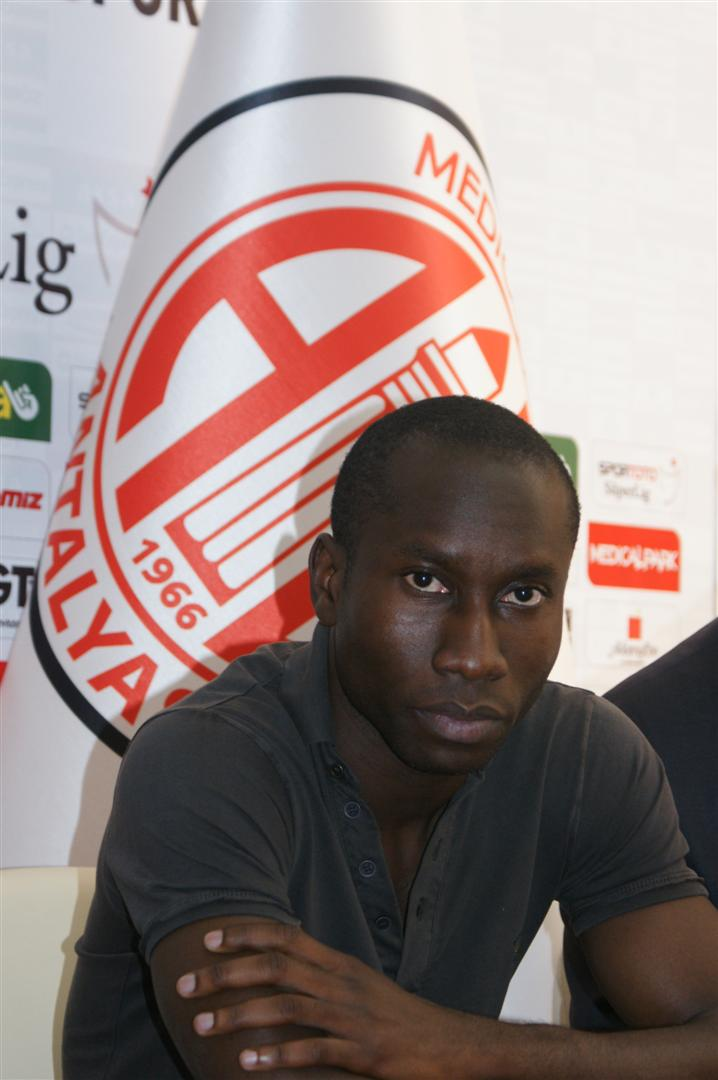
Senegalese international Lamine Diarra, Partizan

- **Bado** (Badara Badji) – Mladost Lučani (2017–2018)
- Yves Baraye – Vojvodina (2022–2023)
- Aboubacar Cissé – **Čukarički Belgrade** (2025–present)
- Serigne Fallou Mbacké Coly – IMT (2024–2025)
- **Lamine Diarra** – Partizan (2007–2010, 2011–2012)
- Cheikhou Dieng – Spartak Subotica (2017–2018)
- Hamady Diop – Čukarički (2024)–2025)
- Mamadou Fall – Red Star Belgrade (2024–(2025), **OFK Beograd** (2025–present)
- Pape Fuhrer – **Partizan Belgrade** (2024–present)
- **Ibrahima Gueye** – Red Star (2006–2009), Radnički Niš (2013–2014)
- **Franck Kanouté** – Partizan (2023–2025), **Radnički Niš** (2025–present)
- Mamadou Mbodj – Napredak Kruševac (2014)–2015), Red Star (2014–2016)
- Babacar Mboup – **Radnički Niš** (2025–present)
- **Cherif Ndiaye** – **Red Star** (2023–present)
- Ibrahima Mame N'Diaye – Napredak Kruševac (2012–2017, 2017–2019), Čukarički (2019–2021, 2021–2024), Mladost Lučani (2024–2025)
- Maissa Ndiaye – Železničar Pančevo (2023–2024)
- **Demba Seck** – **Partizan Belgrade** (2025–present)
- Seydou Bocar Seck – Dinamo Vranje (2018–2020)
- Thierno Thioub – Novi Pazar (2021–2022)

== Sierra Leone ==
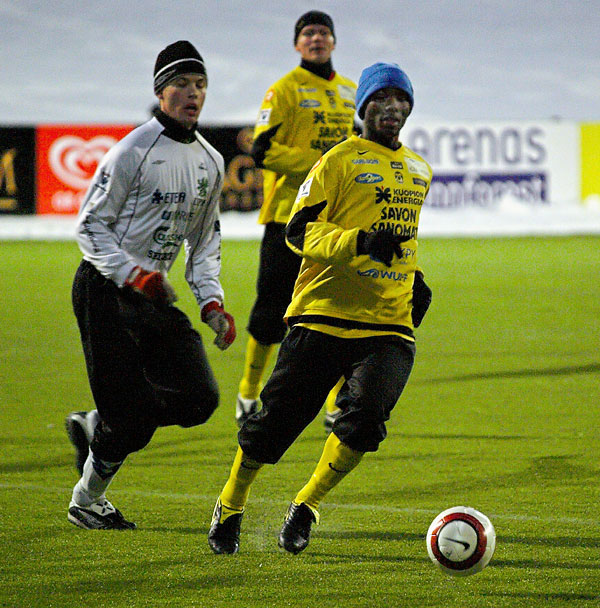
Mohamed Kamara – Medo, Partizan.

- **Mustapha Bangura** – Borac Čačak (2015–2016)
- **Kelfala Marah** – Čukarički Stankom (2003–2005)
- **Medo** (Mohamed Kamara) – Partizan (2010–2013)
- Lamin Suma – Jagodina (2011–2012)
- **Alpha Turay** – Radnički Kragujevac (2024–2025)

== Singapore ==
- **Aleksandar Đurić** – Napredak Kruševac (2000–2001) – ( (Serbia and Montenegro) when active)

== Slovakia ==
Including the period of Czechoslovakia.

- Janoš Buzgo – NAK Novi Sad (1935–1936) – ( (Czechoslovakia) when active)
- Jozef Buzgo – NAK Novi Sad (1935–1936) – ( (Czechoslovakia) when active)
- Hesko – Vojvodina (1923–1924) – ( (Czechoslovakia) when active)
- **Erik Jirka** – Red Star (2018–2019), Radnički Niš (2019–2020)
- **Maroš Klimpl** – Sloboda Užice (2010–2011)
- Richard Nagy – Jedinstvo Ub (2024–2025)
- **Ján Podhradský** – Vojvodina (1935–1936), BSK Beograd (1936–1939) – ( (Kingdom of Yugoslavia) when active)
- **Boris Sekulić** – Železničar Pančevo (2024–2025)
- Nikolas Špalek – TSC Bačka Topola (2022–2023)
- Lajoš Žiga – BASK Beograd (1936–1937) – ( (Czechoslovakia) when active)
- Milan Zvarík – Vojvodina (1985–1986) – ( (Czechoslovakia) when active)

== Slovenia ==
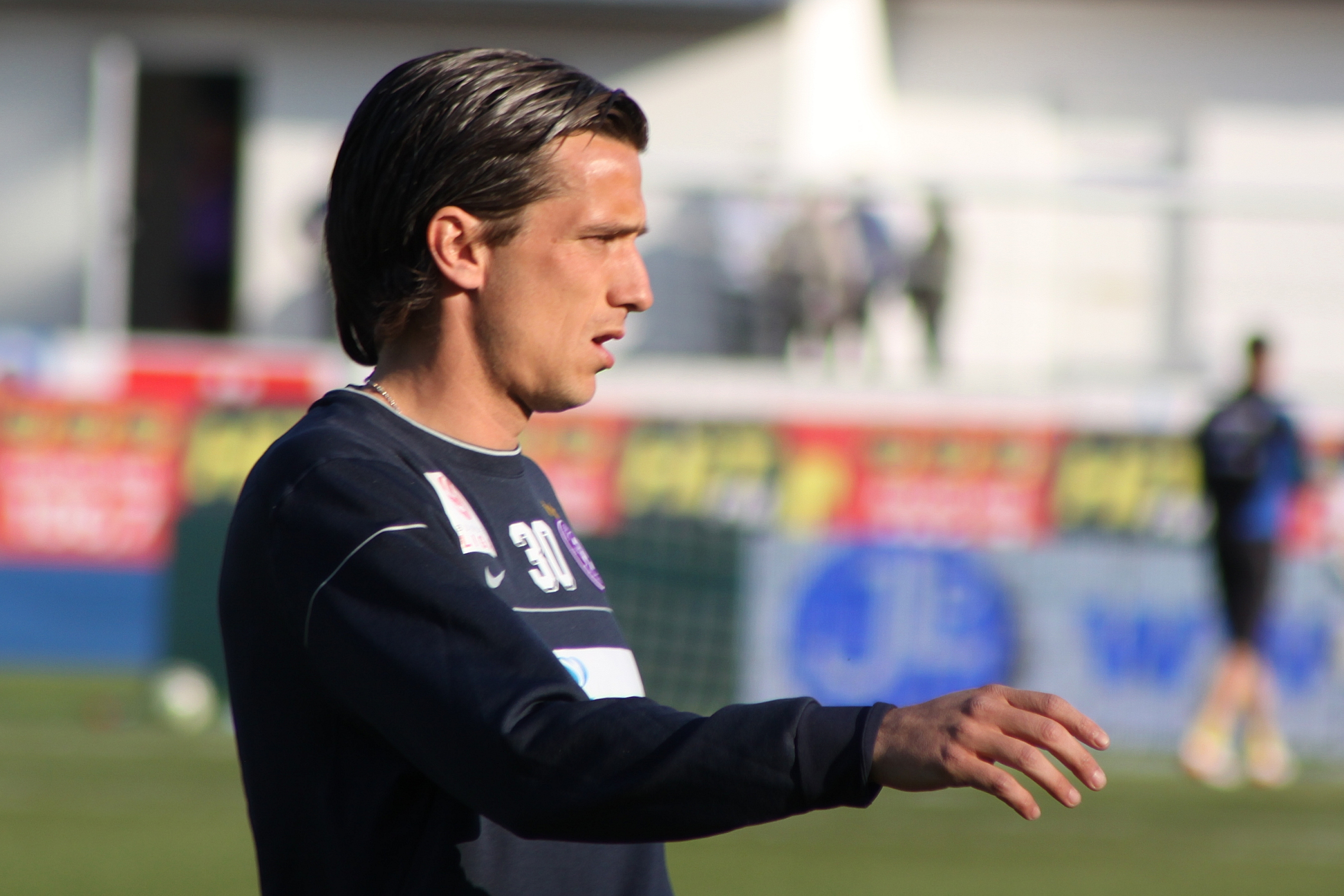
Milenko Ačimovič was Red Star and Slovenian national team playmaker in the turn of the century.

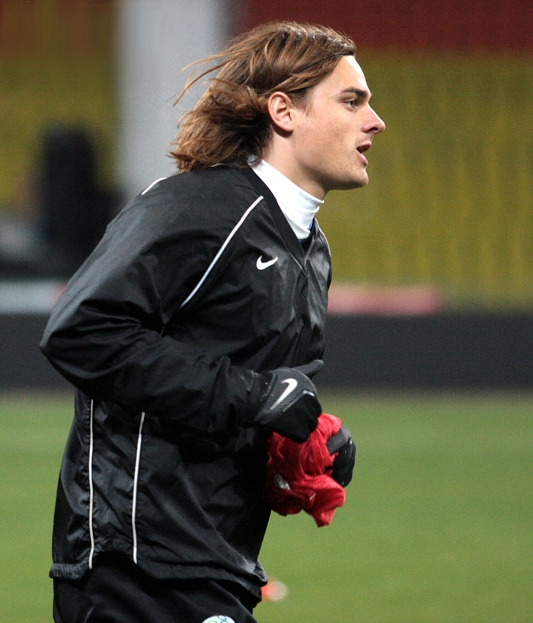
Nejc Pecnik, Red Star.

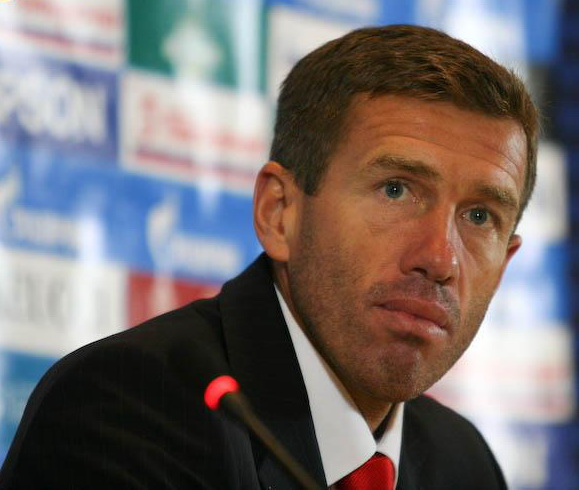
Srečko Katanec, one of Partizans icons from the late 1980s.

Excluded the players that played before 1991 when Slovenia became independent.

- **Milenko Ačimovič** – Red Star (1997–2002)
- **Gregor Balažic** – Partizan (2014–2017)
- Klemen Bolha - Napredak Kruševac (2022–2023)
- Saša Bosilj – Železnik (2001–2002)
- Marko Božič – Rad Beograd (2007–2008)
- Emir Dautović – OFK Beograd (2014–2015, 2015–2016)
- Timotej Dodlek – Bačka Bačka Palanka (2017–2018)
- **Vanja Drkušić** – Red Star (2024–2025)
- Dejan Djermanović – Voždovac (2014–2015)
- **Timi Max Elšnik** – **Red Star** (2014–present)
- **Željko Filipović** – Vojvodina (2019–2020)
- **Branko Ilić** – Partizan (2014–2015)
- Safet Jahič – Partizan (2006–2007)
- Dragan Jelić – Radnički Niš (2013–2014)
- **Mario Jurčevič** – **Partizan** (2024–present)
- Haris Kadrič – Kolubara Lazarevac (2022)-2023), Voždovac (2022–2023)
- Darko Karapetrovič – Radnički Niš (1998–1999), Obilić (1998–1999)
- **Dejan Kelhar** – Red Star (2013–2014)
- David Kiselak – Smederevo (2011–2012)
- Omar Kočar – Mačva Šabac (2020–2021)
- Aljaž Krefl – Spartak Subotica (2016–2017)
- Anej Lovrečič – Voždovac (2014–2015)
- Vladimir Mandić – Vojvodina (2005–2006)
- Danijel Marčeta – Partizan (2008–2009)
- **Darko Milanič** – Partizan (1986–1987, 1988–1993)
- **Džoni Novak** – Partizan (1990–1992)
- Vanja Panić – Mačva Šabac (2020–2021)
- **Nejc Pečnik** – Red Star (2013–2015)
- David Poljanec – Radnički Kragujevac (2014–2015)
- **Milan Rakič** – Smederevo (2009–2010)
- **Aleksander Rodić** – Proleter Zrenjanin (1999–2000), Red Star (2000–2001)
- Rob Rudonja – **Tekstilac Odžaci** (2024–present)
- Filip Starič – Vojvodina (2018–2019)
- **Ante Šimundža** – Železnik (2001–2002)
- **Mirnes Šišić** – Red Star (2008–2009)
- Davor Škerjanc – Voždovac (2014–2015)
- **Zlatko Zahovič** – Partizan (1989–1990, 1991–1993), Proleter Zrenjanin (1990–1991)
- Sandro Zukić – Mačva Šabac (2020–2021)

Slovenian internationals that played in Serbian top league clubs during Yugoslav period:

- **Marko Elsner** – Red Star (1983–1987)
- **Srečko Katanec** – Partizan (1986–1988)
- **Marko Simeunovič** – Red Star (1989–1990), Napredak Kruševac (1990–1991)

== Somalia ==
- **Abdulsamed Abdullahi** – **Novi Pazar** (2025–present)

== South Africa ==
- Kurt Abrahams – Novi Pazar (2023–2024)
- **Bernard Parker** – Red Star (2008–2009)
- **Luther Singh** – Čukarički (2023–2024)

== South Sudan ==
- **Kur Gai Kur** – Novi Pazar (2022–2023)

== Spain ==
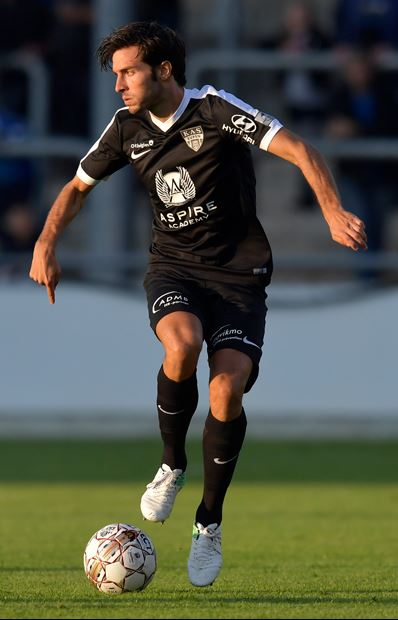
Valiente, Partizan.

- Hugo Alba – **OFK Beograd** (2025–present)
- José Cañas – Red Star (2019–2020)
- Wesley Dual – **OFK Beograd** (2025–present)
- Francis Durán – Jagodina (2012–2013)
- Simón Moreno – Jedinstvo Ub (2024–2025)
- Antonio Moreno – Partizan (2008)–2009)
- Marc Valiente – Partizan (2018–2019)

== Suriname ==
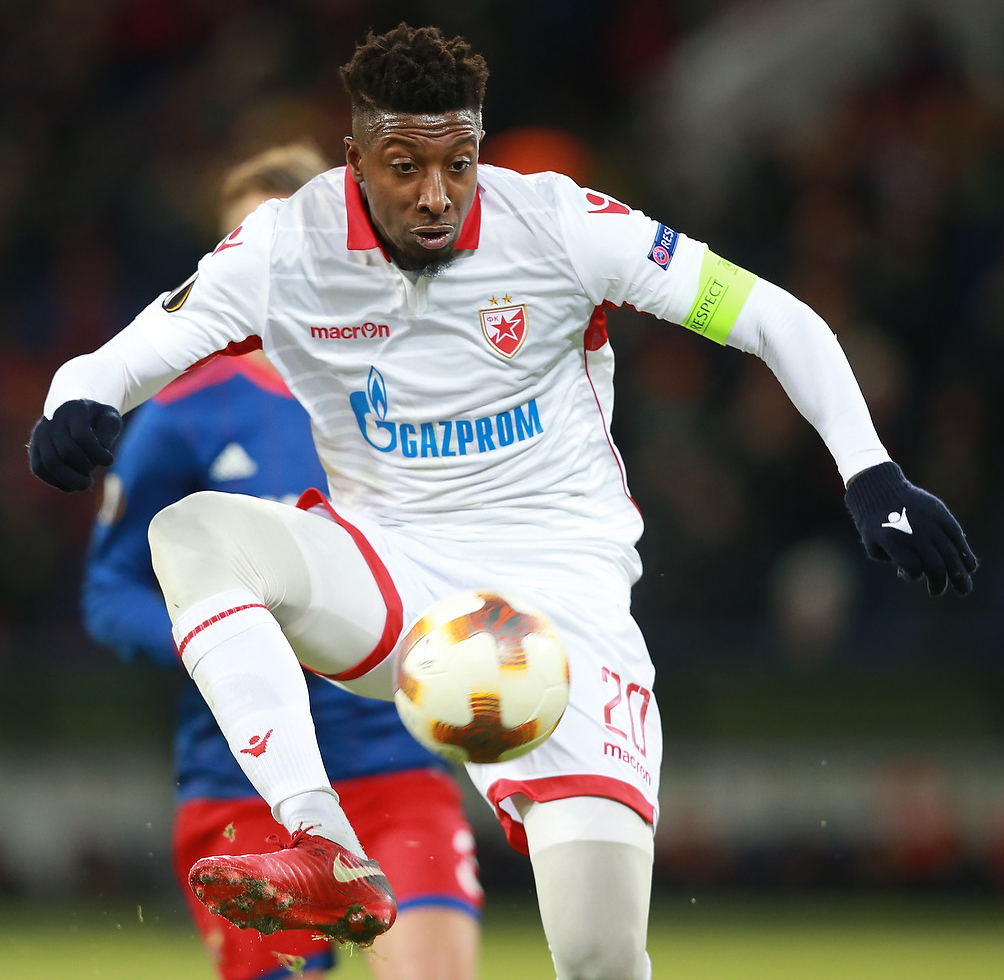
Mitchell Donald, Red Star.

- **Tyrone Conraad** – **TSC Bačka Topola** (2025–present)
- **Gleofilo Vlijter** – OFK Beograd (2024–2025)

== Syria ==
- **Simon Amin** – Radnički Niš (2024–2025)

== Sweden ==
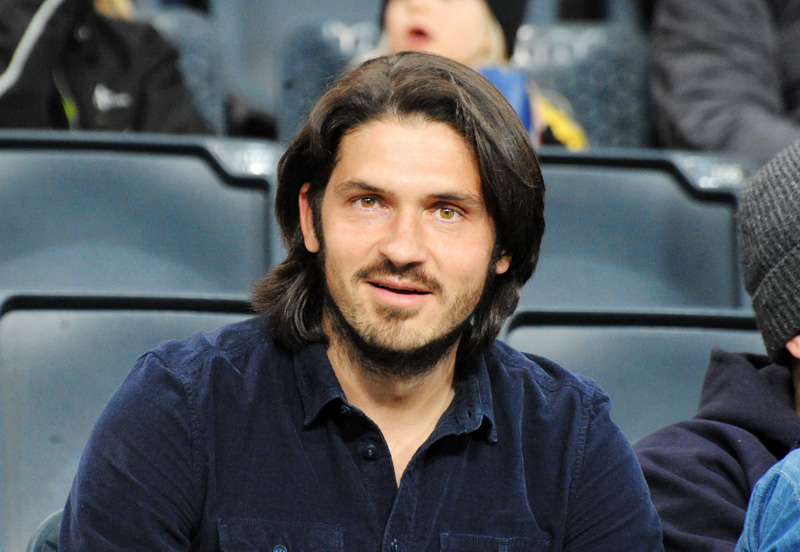
Former ManUtd and Swedish U21 midfielder, Bojan Djordjic, played with Red Star.

- Bojan Djordjic – Red Star (2003–2004)
- Frederick Enaholo – Vojvodina (1991–1992)
- Marko Mitrović – Radnički Niš (2018)–2019, 2019–2020), Dinamo Vranje (2018–(2019)
- **Niclas Nyhlén** – Vojvodina (1984–1985)
- Petar Petrović – **Radnički Niš** (2014–2015, 2018–2019, 2025-present)
- Filip Rogić – IMT Beograd (2023–2024)
- Andrej Simeunović – Voždovac (2017–2018)

== Switzerland ==
- Miloš Antić – OFK Beograd (2014–2016)
- Boško Borenović – Zemun (2006–2007)
- Nemanja Cvijanović – Dinamo Vranje (2018–2020)
- Stefan Čolović – OFK Beograd (2014–2016)
- Filip Frei – Radnički Niš (2022–2025)
- Darko Jevtić – **Jedinstvo Ub** (2024–present)
- Boban Maksimović – Red Star (2008)–2009), Vojvodina (2008–2010)
- Srdjan Maksimović – Rad Beograd (2005–2007)
- Milan Marjanović – Metalac G.M. (2019–2020)
- Nikola Nikolić – BSK Borča (2009–2010)
- Aleksandar Njeguš – Zlatibor Čajetina (2018–2021)
- Nemanja Petrović – Radnik Surdulica (2017–2018)
- Luka Stević – Metalac G.M. (2021–2022)
- Filip Stojilković – OFK Beograd (2024–2025)
- Dejan Subotić – Rad Beograd (2018–2019)
- Nikola Sukačev – Metalac G.M. (2020–2021)
- Stefan Todorović – Javor Ivanjica (2010–2011)

== Tajikistan ==
- **Nuriddin Davronov** – Sloboda Užice (2012–2013)

== Tanzania ==
- **Morice Abraham** – Spartak Subotica (2021–2023)
- Alphonce Msanga – Spartak Subotica (2021–2023)

== Togo ==
- **Emmanuel Hackman** – Mladost GAT (2022–2023)

== Tunisia ==
- Louay Ben Hassine – **Radnički Kragujevac** (2024–present)
- **Wajdi Sahli** – Radnički Kragujevac (2023–2025)
- **Kamel Zaiem** – Partizan (2008–2009)

== Turkey ==
- Burak İngenç – **Novi Pazar** (2025–present)
- Arda Kılıç – **Novi Pazar** (2025–present)
- Ömer Koca – Čukarički Stankom (2000–2002)
- Aytuğ Batur Kömeç – IMT Beograd (2024–2025)
- Günkut Özer – Radnički Niš (2015–2016)
- Feridun Sungur – Novi Pazar (2012-2013)

== Uganda ==
- **Khalid Aucho** – Red Star (2017–2018)
- **Nestroy Kizito** – Vojvodina (2004–2010), Partizan (2010–2011)
- **Eugene Sseppuya** – Vojvodina (2007–2008), Čukarički Stankom (2008–2009), Mladi Radnik (2009)–2010), Borac Čačak (2011–2012)

== Ukraine ==
Including the period of Soviet Union.

- Maksym Andrushchenko – Spartak Subotica (2020–2021)
- Taras Bondarenko – Metalac G.M. (2016–2018), Radnički Niš (2018–2020), Radnik Surdulica (2022–2023)
- Pavlo Bovtunenko – Novi Pazar (2013–2014)
- **Marko Dević** – Zvezdara (2000–2002), Železnik (2002–2003), Voždovac (2004–2005, 2019–2020) – ( (Serbia and Montenegro) (Ukraine) when active)
- Andrei Guzienko - Bečej (1990–1992) - ( (Soviet Union) when active)
- Yevhen Kovalenko – Rad Beograd (2019–2020)
- Serhiy Kulynych – Spartak Subotica (2018–2019)
- Yevhen Pavlov – Mladost Lučani (2014–2015), **Radnik Surdulica** (2019–2021, 2024–present), Radnički Niš (2021–2022), Železničar Pančevo (2023–2024)
- Ivan Spotar – OFK Beograd (1957–1958) – ( (Soviet Union) when active)
- Mykhailo Stelmakh – Spartak Subotica (1991–1992) – ( (Soviet Union) when active)
- Vitaliy Tolmachyov – Spartak Subotica (1993–1994)
- Yuriy Vakulko – Partizan (2018–2019)
- Vadym Zhuk – Spartak Subotica (2016–2017)

== United States ==
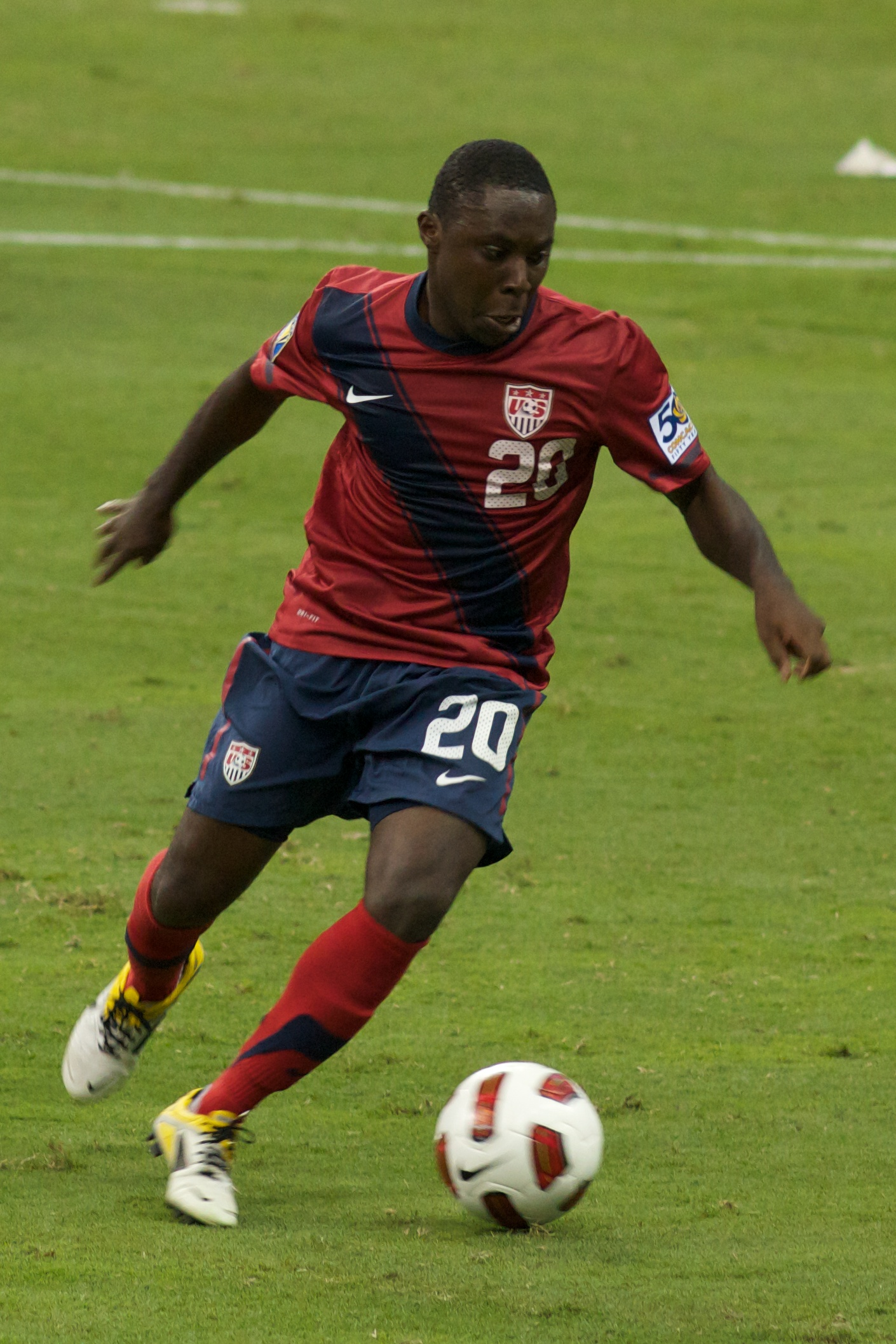
Freddy Adu played with Jagodina in 2014.

- **Freddy Adu** – Jagodina (2014–2015)
- Danny Barrera – Spartak Subotica (2011–2012)
- Vukašin Bulatović – Radnički Kragujevac (2024–2025)
- Mark Conrad – Vojvodina (2007–2008)
- Matt Dunn – OFK Beograd (2011–2013)
- **Romain Gall** – Mladost GAT (2022–2023)
- Jordan Gruber – OFK Beograd (2005–2006)
- Ethan Hoard – **Jedinstvo Ub** (2024–present)
- Will John – Čukarički Stankom (2008–2009)
- **Ilija Mitić** – Partizan (1960–1963), OFK Beograd (1965–1967) – ( (Socialist Federal Republic of Yugoslavia) when active)
- Simon Mršić – Bačka Bačka Palanka (2016–2018)
- Shane O'Neill – Radnički Kragujevac (2024–2025)
- **Preki** – Red Star (1982–1985) – ( (Socialist Federal Republic of Yugoslavia) when active)
- Danilo Radjen – Bačka Bačka Palanka (2020–2021)
- Luciano Sánchez – Novi Pazar (2023–2024)
- **Scoop Stanisic** – Partizan (1983–1984) – ( (Socialist Federal Republic of Yugoslavia) when active)
- Aleksandar Thomas Višić – Rad Beograd (2011–2012)
- **Jeremiah White** – OFK Beograd (2003–2004)

== Uruguay ==
- Guzmán Corujo – Čukarički (2023–2025)
- Miguel Angel Lavié – Javor Ivanjica (2009–2010)
- Gerardo Vonder Pütten – Javor Ivanjica (2009–2010)

== Uzbekistan ==
- **Husniddin Gafurov** – Javor Ivanjica (2013–2017), Mladost Lučani (2017–2018)
- Murod Rajabov – Novi Pazar (2016–2017)
- Amirbek Saidov – **Jedinstvo Ub** (2024–present)

== Zambia ==
- **Kings Kangwa** – Red Star Belgrade (2022–2024)

== Zimbabwe ==
- **Blessing Makunike** – Javor Ivanjica (2002–2003)
- **Mike Temwanjera** – Javor Ivanjica (2003–2006), Borac Čačak (2006–2007)
- **Leonard Tsipa** – Javor Ivanjica (2002–2003)

== Doubts ==
See talk-page.

== Other levels ==
Foreigners in second level

This is a list of foreign players that have played, or play, in the Serbian First League and its predecessors, Second League of Serbia and Montenegro, Yugoslav Second League, top Subassociation Leagues.

The criterion is the same as applied in the main list above.

== Abkhazia ==
- **Daur Chanba** – Teleoptik (2018–2019), Bačka Bačka Palanka (2019–2020) – ( (Russia) when active)
- **Shabat Logua** – Bačka Bačka Palanka (2019–2020), Zlatibor Čajetina (2020–2021) – ( (Russia) when active)

== Albania ==
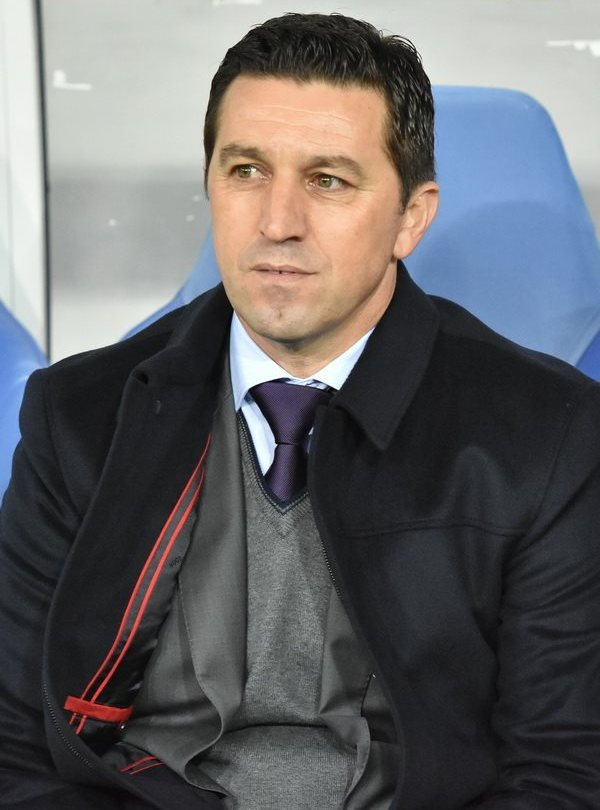
Besnik Hasi started his career at Liria.

- Shpend Abrashi – Trepča (1982–1984)
- Ajazaj – Liria Prizren (1988–1990)
- Bekim Behrami – Priština (1990–1991)
- **Mehmet Dragusha** – Priština (1994–1998)
- **Besnik Hasi** – Liria Prizren (1988–1990)
- Almedin Murati – BSK Borča (2013–2014)
- **Dodë Tahiri** – ASK Obilić Aranđelovac (1930s&1950s)
- Alban Tusuni – Dinamo Vranje (2019–2020)

== Algeria ==
- Adel Beggah – Radnički Beograd (2022–2023), Sloboda Užice (2024–2025)

== Argentina ==
- Franco Abrego – Rad Beograd (2022–2023)
- Guido Barreyro – RFK Novi Sad (2009–2010)
- Luis Ibáñez – Grafičar Beograd (2021–2023)
- Leonardo Iorlano – Radnički Niš (2005–2006)
- Gustavo Marino – Radnički Niš (2005–2006)

== Armenia ==
- **Ognjen Čančarević** – Sloboda Užice (2006–2007, 2008–(2009), (2014)–2015), Sevojno (2008)–2009), Radnički Kragujevac (2009–2014)
- Artem Karapetyan – Bežanija (2017–2018)

== Australia ==
Serbian Australian Susak spent most of his early career in Serbia.

- Vid Amidzic – Bežanija (2011–2012)
- Tomislav Arčaba – OFK Beograd (2015–2017)
- John Belme – RFK Novi Sad (2010–2011)
- Steven Bozinovski – Radnički Niš (2002–2003)
- Matthew Byrne – Donji Srem (2011–2012), Teleoptik (2012–2013)
- James Cakovski – Radnički Sremska Mitrovica (2022–2023)
- Enzo Campana – Zlatibor Čajetina (2022–2023)
- Stephen Frantzeskakis – Sinđelić Beograd (2018–2019)
- Zoran Ilic – Jagodina (1993–1995)
- **Milan Ivanović** – Radnički Niš (1986–1988) – ( (Socialist Federal Republic of Yugoslavia) when active)
- Aleksandar Jovanovic – RFK Novi Sad (2009–2011)
- Aleksandar Jovovic – BASK Beograd (2010–2011)
- Vladimir Kosovac – OFK Beograd (2016–2017)
- Sebastian Petrovich – Mačva Šabac (2003–2004)
- Salvatore Russo – Bežanija (2017)–2018), Sinđelić Beograd (2017–(2018)
- Danilo Spasojević – Sloga Kraljevo (2013–2014)
- Stefan Stanojević – Metalac G.M. (2012–2013), Kolubara Lazarevac (2013–2015), Sloga Kraljevo (2014–(2015), Donji Srem (2015–2016)
- Milan Susak – Veternik (2003–2004), ČSK Pivara (2006–2007)
- Anthony Trajkovski – Smederevo (2019–2020)
- Domenico Velardi – Zlatibor Čajetina (2022–2023)
- Staniša Velinov – **Radnički Beograd** (2023–present)
- Goran Zarić – RFK Novi Sad (199_–199_), Radnički Beograd (1998–1999), Čukarički Stankom (2002–2004)

== Austria ==
- Miloš Andrejić – BSK Borča (2015–2016)
- Josip Bolvari – Spartak Subotica (1983–1984)
- Rudolf Chmelicek – Odžaci SK (1938–19__)
- Tode Djakovic – Smederevo (2019–2020)
- Ludwig Götz – ŠK Amater Sombor (1923)
- Grabliker – Budućnost Valjevo (19__–194_)
- Lazar Lazarević-Živojinović - Žarkovo (2020–2021)
- Saša Lazić – Loznica (2015–2016)
- Franz Machek – RFK Bor (1941–1943) – ( (Nazi Germany) when active)
- Theodor Mantler – UTK Novi Sad (191_–19__)
- Stefan Milojević – Bežanija (2017–2019)
- Miroslav Orlic – Dinamo Vranje (2020–2021)
- Rastko Rastoka – Zlatibor Čajetina (2022–2023)
- Dejan Sarac – Zlatibor Čajetina (2022–2023)

== Azerbaijan ==
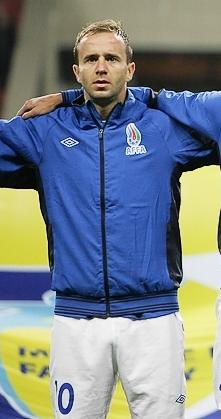
Subasic played in several clubs in Serbia.

- **Murad Hüseynov** – Mladost Lučani (2009–2011)
- David Samedov – Bežanija (2017–2018)
- **Branimir Subašić** – OFK Beograd (2015–2017)

== Barbados ==
- Abiola Grant – Radnički Sremska Mitrovica (2021–2022), **Inđija** (2023–present)

== Belarus ==
- Daniil Dushevskiy – **Mladost GAT** (2024–present)
- Ilya Tyunis – Dinamo Vranje (2016–2017)

== Belgium ==
- Nikola Pejcic - Mačva Šabac (2021–2022)

== Bosnia and Herzegovina ==
The players that played before 1992 are excluded except for the ones that played for the Bosnian national team.

- **Admir Aganović** – FK Teleoptik (2004–2006), Dinamo Vranje (2006–2007)
- Esmir Ahmetović – Sinđelić Beograd (2017–2018)
- Mile Andrić – Sloboda Užice (1992–1994, 2001–2002), Sloga Kraljevo (199_–199_), FK Sevojno
- Aleksandar Anđić – Jedinstvo Ub (2001–2002), FK Dorćol (2002–2003)
- Nemanja Arsenić – Proleter Novi Sad (2009–2010)
- Nemanja Arsić – FK Bežanija (2008–2009)
- Milun Avramović - **Zlatibor Čajetina** (2022–present)
- Miloš Bajić – Napredak Kruševac (2011–2015), BSK Borča (2016–2017), Smederevo (2019–2020), **IMT Beograd** (2018–2019,2020–present)
- Marko Bjeković – **Kabel Novi Sad** (2019–present)
- Zoran Blagojević – Mladost Apatin (1997–1999)
- Slaviša Bogdanović – Radnik Surdulica (2013–2014), BSK Borča (2015–2017), OFK Žarkovo (2018)
- Slobodan Bojić – Radnički Sombor (2011–2013, 2014–2015)
- Boris Bošković – Mladost Apatin (200_–200_), BSK Borča (2008–2009), **Srem S.Mitrovica** (2011–present)
- Igor Božić – Rad Beograd (2005–2009)
- **Mario Božić** – FK Loznica (2001–2003, 2015–2017), Radnički Stobex (2002–(2003), FK Beograd (2003–2004)
- Saša Božić – Dinamo Vranje (2007–2009)
- Bakir Brajlović – Radnički Beograd' 2023–2024)
- Adnan Cakić – Mačva Šabac (2006–2008)
- Anđelko Crnomarković – OFK Mladenovac (2007–2008)
- Nedeljko Crnomarković – FK Bežanija (2012–2014)
- Enes Curkić – Radnički Pirot (2006–2007)
- Sredoje Cvjetičanin – Radnički Beograd, RFK Novi Sad, FK Bor (1998–1999), Rad Beograd, FK Obilić
- Benjamin Čalaković – Dinamo Vranje (2019–2020)
- Davor Čavrić – Banat Zrenjanin (2007–2012, 2013–2014)
- Novica Čomić – Mladost Apatin (2001–2005)
- Miroslav Čovilo – RFK Novi Sad (2007–2010)
- Marko Čubrilo – FK Teleoptik (2016–2018), OFK Žarkovo (2019)–2020), **Budućnost Dobanovci** (2019–present)
- Siniša Čubrilo – ČSK Pivara (1997–2004)
- Nikola Danilović – Sinđelić Beograd (2013)–2014), Dolina Padina (2013–(2014)
- Nebojša Desnica – ČSK Pivara (2006–2009), RFK Novi Sad (2010–2011)
- Aleksandar Dikić – RFK Novi Sad (2011–2012)
- Vladan Dinić – Radnik Surdulica (2014–2015)
- Boban Dragić – Spartak Subotica (2006–2007)
- Dalibor Dragić – Proleter Novi Sad (2009–2010)
- Zoran Dragišić – Javor Ivanjica (1995–1996)
- Goran Dragović – Radnički Beograd (2001–2002), FK Voždovac (2002–2008)
- Dražen Dubačkić – **Mladost GAT** (2023–present)
- Ratko Dujković – OFK Kikinda (200_–200_)
- Miroslav Dukić – **FK Loznica** (2013–present)
- **Ifet Đakovac** – Zlatibor Čajetina (2019–2021)
- Ognjen Đelmić – Rad Beograd (2006–2008)
- Boban Đerić – FK Inđija (2011–2012), **Javor Ivanjica** (2017–present)
- Gordan Đerić – RFK Novi Sad (2009–2010)
- Uroš Đerić – Borac Čačak (2013–2016), Sloboda Užice (2016–2017, 2023–2024)
- Rade Đokić – Kabel Novi Sad (199_–200_), Srem S.Mitrovica (200_–2004)
- Željko Đokić – Javor Ivanjica (2007–2011), **FK Zemun** (2016–present)
- Mladen Đoković – RFK Novi Sad (2011–2012)
- Dejan Đogo – Sinđelić Niš (2011–2012), Metalac G.M. (2012–2013)
- Aleksandar Đurašović – Mladost Apatin (1997–1999)
- Miloš Đurđić – ČSK Pivara (2016–2017)
- Saša Đuričić – FK Beograd (20__–20__)
- Siniša Đurić – Spartak Subotica (2004–2005)
- **Velibor Đurić** – Proleter Zrenjanin (2003–2004)
- Predrag Erak – Sloga Kraljevo (2001–2003)
- Borislav Erić – FK Inđija (2013–2014)
- Nikola Eskić – **Sloboda Užice** (2023–present)
- Haris Fazlagić – Banat Zrenjanin (2010–2011)
- Luka Gajić – FK Teleoptik (2013–2014)
- Radovan Gajić – Dinamo Pančevo (1998–____)
- Mladen Galić – Proleter Novi Sad (2011–2012), Bačka Bačka Palanka (2015–2017), OFK Odžaci (2016–2017), **TSC Bačka Topola** (2017–present)
- Miodrag Gigović – BASK Beograd (2006)–2007)
- Slobodan Gigović – Dolina Padina (2012–2014)
- Dragan Glogovac – Radnički Beograd (1999–2000)
- Stevo Glogovac – FK Zvezdara (1995–1997)
- Ivan Gluhović – Donji Srem (2015–2017)
- Aleksej Golijanin - **Grafičar Beograd** (2020–present)
- Radoslav Golubović – Mladost Luks (____–____)
- Jovan Golić – Mladost Luks (2002–2005), FK Inđija (2006–2010)
- Bojan Gostimirović – FK Inđija (2005–2007)
- Slobodan Grbić – Banat Zrenjanin (2012–2014)
- Boris Gujić – ČSK Pivara (2006–2008)
- Šerif Hasić – FK Novi Pazar (2010–2011)
- **Nermin Haskić** – FK Voždovac (2012–2013)
- Alen Holjan – ČSK Pivara (2006–2007)
- Luka Ikonić – RFK Novi Sad (2013–2014)
- Jovan Ilić - **RFK Novi Sad** (2022–present)
- Filip Ivezić – Proleter Novi Sad (2014–2015)
- Maid Jaganjac – FK Inđija (2011–2012)
- Vlado Jagodić – Morava Ćuprija (199_–199_)
- Adnan Jahić – FK Inđija (2009–2010)
- Bojan Jamina – FK Zvezdara (1997–1998)
- Nemanja Janičić – FK Bežanija (2011)–2012), Napredak Kruševac (2011–2015)
- Stefan Janjić – Bačka Bačka Palanka (2014–2015)
- Ognjen Jeftenić – FK Bežanija (2012–2013)
- Branko Jelić – Borac Čačak (1995–2000)
- Peđa Jerinić – RFK Novi Sad (2012–2013)
- Igor Joksimović – Hajduk Beograd (2001–2002), FK Zemun (2006–2008)
- Mladen Jovančić – FK Dorćol (2002–2003), Radnički Beograd (2003–2004)
- Vladimir Jovančić – BASK Beograd (2005–2007), Rad Beograd (2007–2011)
- Branko Jovanović – BASK Beograd (2010–2011)
- Jovica Jovanović – FK Bežanija (2015–2016)
- Petar Jovanović – Radnički Stobex (2001–2005), Čukarički Stankom (2003–(2004), OFK Mladenovac (2006–2007), Sloboda Užice (2009–2011, 2022–2023), FK Sevojno (2009–2010), Jedinstvo Putevi (2012–2013), Zlatibor Čajetina (2019–2020, 2021–2022)
- Darko Jović – Proleter Novi Sad (2016)–2017), OFK Odžaci (2016–(2017), **ČSK Pivara** (2017–present)
- Aleksandar Kahvić - Grafičar Beograd (2022–2023), OFK Beograd (2023–2024)
- **Đorđe Kamber** – Zastava Kragujevac (1998–2001), Remont Čačak (2001–2002), Mačva Šabac (2004–2006), Srem S.Mitrovica (2005–(2006)
- Vedran Kantar – OFK Mladenovac (2007–2008)
- Radovan Karaman – **Zemun** (2024–present)
- Nikola Karanović – Srem S.Mitrovica (2010–2012)
- Dragan Kavaz – RFK Novi Sad (1988–1990), Napredak Kruševac (1990–1993)
- Igor Kenjalo – FK Bežanija (2012–2014)
- **Dušan Kerkez** – Srem S.Mitrovica, FK Voždovac
- Darko Kikanović – Kolubara Lazarevac (2011–2012)
- Nenad Kiso – Zemun (2017–2018, 2019–2020), **Žarkovo** (2020–present)
- Duško Klindo – Mladost Luks (2003–2008)
- Arsen Knežević – **Kolubara Lazarevac** (2019–present)
- Igor Kojić – FK Obilić (200_–200_), Rad Beograd (2007–2008), Hajduk Beograd (2008–2009)
- Saša Kolunija – FK Bežanija (2005–2007, (2008)–2009, 2014–2015, 2017–2018), FK Voždovac (2007)–2008), FK Zemun (2015–2016)
- Dragiša Komarčević – **Loznica** (2020–present)
- Vladanko Komlenović – Mladost Lučani (2008–2010), FK Zemun (2010–2011)
- Milivoj Kovačević – FK Inđija (2012–2013)
- Bojan Kremenović – Bačka Bačka Palanka (2014–2015), ČSK Pivara (2015–2016)
- Sulejman Krpić – Metalac G.M. (2012–2013)
- Esad Kuhinja – Napredak Kruševac (1990–1994)
- Vladan Kujundžić – Remont Čačak (2001–2003), Metalac G.M. (2006–2008), Banat Zrenjanin (2010–2011)
- Radojica Kukolj – FK Loznica (2002–2003)
- Nikola Kulašević – FK Inđija (2006–2008)
- Miloš Kuljanin – Metalac G.M. (2012–2013)
- Milan Lalić – Radnički Kragujevac (2018)–2019), Budućnost Dobanovci (2018–2019), Dinamo Vranje (2019–2020)
- Miodrag Latinović – Mačva Šabac (199_–199_)
- Milan Lazarević – Proleter Novi Sad (2015–2017)
- Nemanja Lekanić – Sloga Kraljevo (2013–2014), Mačva Šabac (2015–2017), Sinđelić Beograd (2017–2018)
- Dejan Limić – FK Jagodina (2007–2008)
- Mitar Lukić – Mačva Šabac (1991–199_)
- Marinko Mačkić – Mladost Lučani (2000–2003)
- Zoran Majstorović – Radnički Beograd (2003–200_)
- Mirko Malinović – OFK Kikinda (2001–2003, 2004–(2005), 2007–2009, 2010–2012, 2013–2014), Mladost Apatin (2003–2005), BASK Beograd (2006–2007)
- Stevo Malinović – BASK Beograd (2006–2007)
- Milenko Malović – Radnički Nova Pazova (2012)–2013), FK Čukarički (2012–(2013), Sinđelić Beograd (2014–2016), **Budućnost Dobanovci** (2018–present)
- Strahinja Manojlović - Mačva Šabac (2020-2022), Grafičar Beograd (2021–2022)
- Slavko Marić – Hajduk Beograd (2001–2006), Mladost Lučani (2006–2008)
- Jefto Marković – FK Loznica (2007–2011)
- Neven Marković – Rad Beograd (2005–2008)
- Vladimir Marković – Proleter Novi Sad (2014–2015)
- Dragan Matković - Radnički Sremska Mitrovica (2020-2022)
- Darjan Matović – FK Inđija (2013–2014)
- Nemanja Matović – FK Bežanija (2010–2016), Mačva Šabac (2016–2017), Radnički Pirot (2017)–2018), Sinđelić Beograd (2017–(2018)
- Marko Mazalica – Rad Beograd (2005–2007)
- Miodrag Medan – Bačka Bačka Palanka (199_–199_), Rad Beograd (199_–1995)
- Goran Medenica – FK Zemun (2006–2008)
- Nedžad Mehović – FK Novi Pazar (1997–1999)
- **Almir Memić** – RFK Novi Sad (1991)
- **Samir Memišević** – FK Teleoptik (2012–2013, 2013–(2014), FK Bežanija (2013)–2014)
- Dragan Mičić – FK Loznica (1993–1996), Banat Zrenjanin (2002–2007)
- Marko Mihajlović – RFK Novi Sad (2008-2010), **Sloga Kraljevo** (2020–present)
- Nenad Mijailović – Jedinstvo Ub (2009–(2010)
- Borislav Mikić – Železničar Lajkovac (1998–1999), Remont Čačak (2000–2002)
- Miroslav Milutinović – ČSK Pivara (2004–2006), Kolubara Lazarevac (2010)–2011, 2013–(2014), RFK Novi Sad (2010–(2011), FK Inđija (2011–2014)
- Milan Mirić – FK Bežanija (200_–2010)
- Milan Mirić – Sloboda Užice (2017–2019), Zlatibor Čajetina (2018–(2019)
- Igor Mišan – Radnički Sombor (2009–2010), RFK Novi Sad (2011–2013)
- Jovo Mišeljić – Radnički Niš (1992–1995, 2001–2003), Proleter Zrenjanin (2000–2001), OFK Niš (2003–2004)
- **Nenad Mišković** – Radnički Beograd (1993–1997)
- Marko Mitrušić – Metalac G.M. (2012)–2013), OFK Mladenovac (2012–(2013), FK Bežanija (2013–2015, 2016–2017), Donji Srem (2015–2016)
- Siniša Mladenović – Sloga Kraljevo (2008–2009, 2010–2014), Grafičar Beograd (2019–2020)
- Nikola Mojović – Proleter Novi Sad (2009–2011)
- Aleksa Mrđa – Inđija (2018–(2019)
- Momčilo Mrkajić – FK Bežanija (2009–2011, (2011)–2012), BSK Borča (2013–2015)
- Nemanja Mrkajić – Donji Srem (2010–2012)
- Dragan Mučibabić – Hajduk Beograd
- **Siniša Mulina** – Milicionar Beograd (1997–2000)
- Igor Muratović – Železničar Beograd (2001–2002), Radnički Beograd (2003–2004, 2005–2006), Radnički Obrenovac (2004–2005)
- **Stevo Nikolić** – **OFK Žarkovo** (2019–present)
- Nenad Novaković – Timok Zaječar (2012–2013)
- Muhamed Omić – FK Inđija (2009–2010)
- Amer Osmanagić – FK Zemun (2016–2017)
- Amir Osmančević – Sloga Kraljevo (2014–2015)
- Branko Ostojić – Radnički Kragujevac (2007–2008, 2018–2019)
- Aco Pandurević – Železničar Beograd (2001–2002), OFK Mladenovac (2012)–2013)
- Omar Pašagić – **RFK Novi Sad** (2023–present)
- Ljubiša Pecelj – **Kolubara Lazarevac** (2019–2020,2021–present)
- **Nebojša Pejić** – BSK Borča (2006–2011)
- Aleksandar Perendija – FK Voždovac (2007–2008)
- Saša Perić – **OFK Žarkovo** (2019–present)
- Milovan Petrić – RFK Novi Sad (2012–2013), BSK Borča (2014–2015), Proleter Novi Sad (2015–2016), Kolubara Lazarevac (2016–2017), FK Bečej (2018–2019), **Kabel Novi Sad** (2019–present)
- Novica Petrović – Mladost Apatin (2008–2010), Radnički Sombor (2010–2011), Srem S.Mitrovica (2011–2013)
- Almir Pliska – Moravac Mrštane (2014–2015)
- Željko Polak – Mačva Šabac (1989–199_), Palilulac Beograd (1998–1999), Radnički Beograd (1999–2000, 2001–2004), FK Bežanija (2004–2006)
- Dajan Ponjević - RFK Novi Sad (2010-2011), Proleter Novi Sad (2013-2014), Bačka Bačka Palanka (2014–2017, 2017-2021), OFK Odžaci (2016-(2017), ČSK Čelarevo (2017)-2018), Grafičar Beograd (2021-2022)
- Mirko Popadić – FK Bežanija (2013–2014)
- Nikola Popara – FK Teleoptik (2009–2012)
- Nikola Popin – RFK Novi Sad (2005–2008), ČSK Pivara (2008–2009, 2013–2014), Proleter Novi Sad (2009–2011)
- Dejan Popović – FK Inđija (2013–2014), Dinamo Vranje (2019–2020)
- Goran Popović – FK Zemun (2007–2008)
- Damir Poturović – FK Smederevo (2013–2014)
- **Ilija Prodanović** – Mladost Goša (2002–2003)
- Milan Pržulj – Hajduk Beograd (2003–200_)
- Velibor Pudar – Čukarički Stankom (1993–1995), Jedinstvo Paraćin (1995–(1996), Palilulac Beograd (1996–1997)
- Darko Raca – Mladost Apatin (1997–1998), ČSK Pivara (2009–2010)
- Čedomir Radić – OFK Mladenovac (2011–2013), Sinđelić Beograd (2013–2015)
- Danko Radić – **Sinđelić Beograd** (2017–present)
- Dušan Radić – **FK Loznica** (2014–present)
- Dragan Radović – Mladi Radnik (1995–1997), Sartid Smederevo (199_–199_)
- Slaviša Radović – FK Zemun (2016–2017)
- Dragan Rajović – Spartak Subotica (2003–2004, 2006–2007)
- Zoran Rajović – FK Vrbas (1997–1999)
- Marinko Rastoka – Mladost Lučani (2011–2012)
- Rastko Rastoka - **Zlatibor Čajetina** (2022–present)
- Mladen Ratkovica – FK Bečej (2001–2002), FK Bežanija (2002–2003, 2009–2010), Srem S.Mitrovica (2010–2011)
- Siniša Ratković – **Banat Zrenjanin** (2010–present)
- Zoran Repac – RFK Novi Sad (200_–2003), FK Beograd (2003–200_)
- Ilija Ristanić – Rad Beograd (2007–2008)
- Edin Rustemović – Sinđelić Beograd (2013–2014)
- Branislav Ružić – Mladost Apatin (2009–2010), Kolubara Lazarevac (2010–2011)
- **Damir Sadiković** – Kolubara Lazarevac (2022–2023)
- Stefan Santrač – Grafičar Beograd (2018–2020), **FK Loznica** (2022–present)
- Boris Savić – Hajduk Beograd (2008–2009)
- Denijel Savić – FK Teleoptik (2010–2012)
- Stojan Savić – Mladost Luks (____–____)
- Željko Savić – FK Inđija (2012–2014)
- Miloš Sekulović – Napredak Kruševac (2014–2016)
- Miljan Sekulović – Dinamo Pančevo (1992–1995, 1997–1999)
- Senad Seljimi – Srem Jakovo (2002–2006, 2009–2010), BASK Beograd (2006–2008), ČSK Pivara (2008–2009)
- Jovan Sikima – Radnički Pirot (1997–1998), FK Zvezdara (1998–1999), Mladost Apatin (2002–2003)
- Milan Simić – Srem S.Mitrovica (2003–2004)
- Marko Simović – FK Teleoptik (2017–2018 ), **Smederevo** (2019–present)
- Elvedin Spahić – OFK Niš (2005–2006), FK Novi Pazar (2007–2008)
- Milan Srećo – Radnički Stobex (2002–2003), OFK Mladenovac (2007)–2008), FK Zemun (2007–(2008)
- Filip Sredojević – OFK Odžaci (2016)–2017)
- Duško Stajić – Proleter Zrenjanin (2000–2002)
- Valeri Stanić – Kabel Novi Sad (1998–200_), FK Veternik (200_–2004)
- Slobodan Stanojlović – FK Loznica (2020–2021)
- Saša Stević – Banat Zrenjanin (2008–2010), FK Zemun (201_–2015)
- Nenad Studen – FK Teleoptik (2000–2002)
- Boško Stupić – OFK Mladenovac (2005–2006)
- **Nemanja Supić** – Radnički Obrenovac (2004)–2005), FK Bežanija (2004–(2005), Čukarički Stankom (2006–2007), FK Voždovac (2007–2008)
- Pavle Sušić – Srem S. Mitrovica (2006–2007)
- Zoran Šaraba – RFK Novi Sad (2004–2005)
- Admir Šarčević – FK Vojvodina (1989–1990), FK Novi Pazar (1992–1993)
- Budimir Šarčević – Sinđelić Beograd (2015–2016), Budućnost Dobanovci (2016–2017)
- Stefan Šavija – **Tekstilac Odžaci** (2023–present)
- Milomir Šešlija – Sloboda Užice (1991–1992)
- Ognjen Šinik – Mladost Apatin (2009–2010), Srem S.Mitrovica (2011–2012), Mladost Lučani (2012–2013), Dinamo Vranje (2015–2016)
- Aleksandar Šljivić – FK Bežanija (200_–2010), BASK Beograd (2010–2012)
- Nebojša Šodić – Mladost Apatin (2007–2008)
- Zoran Šupić – Remont Čačak (2001–2002), Metalac G.M. (2003–2004), FK Bežanija (2004–2006, (2006–2007), BSK Borča (2011–2015), OFK Odžaci (2015–2016)
- Srđan Tarbuk – Mačva Šabac (2011–201_)
- **Amir Teljigović** – Proleter Zrenjanin (1986–1992, 2000–2002), Mladi Radnik (2002–2003, 2004–2005)
- Sergej Tica – Budućnost Valjevo (199_–199_), Hajduk Beograd (199_–199_), Milicionar Beograd (1997–1998)
- Darjan Todorović – Javor Ivanjica (2006–2007), Srem S.Mitrovica (2007–2009), FK Inđija (2011–2013)
- **Ognjen Todorović** – **OFK Vršac** (2022–present)
- Borislav Topić – BSK Borča (2006–2010)
- Ranko Torbica – Sloboda Užice (2015–2016)
- Bojan Trkulja – Radnički Pirot (2006–2007)
- Milorad Trkulja – Mladost Luks (____–____)
- Haris Ukić – FK Novi Pazar (2006–2009)
- Nikola Valentić – FK Voždovac (2001–2005), Srem S. Mitrovica (2005–2006), FK Inđija (2015–2016), FK Bežanija (2015–(2016), Sinđelić Beograd (2018–2019)
- Dragan Vasić – Mačva Šabac (199_–199_), Sartid Smederevo (199_–199_)
- Aleksandar Vasiljević – Budućnost Dobanovci (2004–2005, 2016–2017), FK Bežanija (2005–2008), FK Sevojno (2008–2009), FK Mladi Radnik (2008–2010), Sloga Kraljevo (2014–2015)
- Branislav Vasiljević – Proleter Novi Sad (2012–2013), Bačka Bačka Palanka (2015–2016)
- Zoran Vasiljević – Sloboda Užice (1992–1995), FK Loznica (199_–199_)
- Saša Vidović – Srem Jakovo (2001–2003), Mladost Lux (2003–2004), Rad Beograd (2007–2010), FK Zemun (2010–2011), **RFK Novi Sad** (2012–present)
- Nemanja Vještica – FK Teleoptik (2018–2019), Bačka Bačka Palanka (2020-2022), **Zlatibor Čajetina** (2022-present)
- Danilo Vlačić – FK Bežanija (2009)–2010, 2010–2012), Mladost Apatin (2009–(2010)
- Predrag Vladić – Kabel Novi Sad (2018–2020), Radnički Sremska Mitrovica (2021-2022), **Kabel Novi Sad** (2022-present)
- Darko Vojvodić – FK Loznica, Napredak Kruševac, FK Badnjevac, Radnički Kragujevac (199_–199_), Sartid Smederevo (1998–2001), Milicionar Beograd
- Zlatko Vojvodić – **Sinđelić Beograd** (2010–present)
- Željko Vranješ – ČSK Pivara (1994–1999)
- Igor Vujanović – Železničar Beograd (1999–2000), Remont Čačak (2001–2002)
- Filip Vujić – Radnički Sombor (2011–2012), Jedinstvo Putevi (2012–2013)
- Filip Vujović – **FK Žarkovo** (2016–present)
- Stefan Vukadin – FK Čukarički (2012–2013), Metalac GM (2017–2019), **Grafičar Beograd** (2019–present)
- Goran Vukliš – OFK Beograd (2016–2017), FK Novi Pazar (2017–2018), Kabel Novi Sad (2019–2020), RFK Novi Sad (2023)–2024)
- Dejan Vukomanović – FK Inđija (2015–2016), FK Novi Pazar (2017–2018)
- Bojan Vuković – Proleter Novi Sad (2010–2011)
- Zoran Vuković – RFK Novi Sad (2012–2016), ČSK Pivara (2016–2017)
- Nikola Zagrađanin – Bane Raška (199_–199_), Borac Čačak (199_–1998)
- Milosav Zečić – Sloboda Užice (1998–1999)
- Vanja Zekić – **FK Bežanija** (2016–present)
- Borislav Zgonjanin – Proleter Novi Sad (2011–2013)
- Mladen Zgonjanin – **OFK Odžaci** (2015–present)
- Ivan Zlatanović – Radnički Niš (2006–2007)
- Predrag Živković – Jedinstvo Ub (2005–2006)
- Milija Žižić – ČSK Pivara (2006–2007)

== Brazil ==
- Adãozinho (Adão Cleiton Bernardes Pontes) – Srem S.Mitrovica (2006–2007)
- Alex (Alex dos Santos Gonçalves) – Teleoptik (2008–2010)
- Anderson Costa (Anderson José de Jesús Costa) – Dinamo Pančevo (2002–2004)
- Anderson de França (Anderson de França) – Srem S.Mitrovica (2006–2007)
- Gabriel Bacan (Gabriel Rocha Bacan) - Rad Beograd (2022–2023)
- Casimiro (Marcelo da Silva Casimiro) – Inđija (2007–2009)
- Dinei (Vatinei César Moreira dos Santos) – Srem S.Mitrovica (2006–2007)
- Edmilson (Edmilson de Carvalho Barbosa) – Srem S.Mitrovica (2007–2008)
- Eliomar (Eliomar Correia Silva) – **Javor Ivanjica** (2008–2012, 2015–2018,2021–present)
- Erivelto (Erivelto Alixandrino da Silva) – Srem S.Mitrovica (2006–2007)
- Fabinho (Fábio de Oliveira Manoel) – Spartak Subotica (2008–2009)
- Fábio Ricardo (Fábio Ricardo Sanos Soares) – Srem S.Mitrovica (2006–2007)
- Fábio Silva (Fabio Carleandro da Silva) – Rad Beograd (2006–2007)
- Franco (Franco Alves de Souza) – Sevojno (2008–2009)
- Geovane (Geovani Feital de Oliveira) – Bežanija (2014–2016)
- Hegon (Henrique Martins de Andrade) – Jagodina (2016–2018)
- Jairon (Jairon Feliciano Damasio) – Radnički Niš (2004–2006)
- Kamilo Silva (Kamilo Oliveira da Silva) – Jedinstvo Putevi (2012–2013)
- Leandro Pinto (Leandro Climaco Pinto) - RFK Novi Sad (2022–2023), Kolubara Lazarevac (2023)–2024), **Javor Ivanjica** (2024–present)
- Luis Gustavo (Luis Gustavo Lopes dos Santos) – Bežanija (2014–2016)
- Magno (Magno Costa Fernandes) – Bežanija (2014–2015)
- Maurício (Maurício Paiva Costa) – Sevojno (2008–2009)
- Nathan (Nathan Crepaldi da Cruz) - Rad Beograd (2022–2023)
- Ricardo Pereira (José Ricardo Pereira dos Santos) – Srem S.Mitrovica (2006–2007)
- Pierre (Pierre Ramos Vieira Ladeira) – Sevojno (2008–2009)
- Jose Pontes (José António Bernardes Pontes) – Srem S.Mitrovica (2006–2007)
- Rafael Carioca (Rafael Felipe Barreto) – Banat Zrenjanin (2008–2010)
- Raphael (Raphael José da Silva) – Srem S.Mitrovica (2009–2010)
- Ricardinho (Ricardo Silva de Almeida) – Borac Čačak (2012–2014)
- Riquelme (Riquelme Sousa Silva) – Vršac (2023–2025)
- Rivan (Rivanilton de França) – Hajduk Beograd (2002–2003)
- Rodrigo Leorato aka Preto (Rodrigo Leorato) – Inđija (2008–2009)
- Rodrigo Negro (Rodrigo Neves Negro) – Srem S.Mitrovica (2006–2007)
- Tiago (Tiago Galvão da Silva) – **Kolubara Lazarevac** (2023–present)
- Val Baiano (Jercival Sousa Santos) – Dinamo Vranje (2020–2021), Mladost GAT (2021–2022)
- Gustavo Vieira (Gustavo Vieira Francisco) – Jedinstvo Ub (2023–2024)
- Mateus Viveiros (Mateus Viveiros Andrade) – Bežanija (2017–2018)
- Washington Santana (Washington Santana da Silva) – Teleoptik (2008–2010)
- William (William Artur de Oliveira) – Srem S.Mitrovica (2006–2008)
- William Alves (William Rocha Alves) – Borac Čačak (2008–2013)

== Bulgaria ==
- Nisim Alkalay – Jug Bogdan Prokuplje (1919–1924), Pobeda Niš (1924–1925)
- Kiril Chobanov – RFK Novi Sad (2012–2013)
- Viktor Gantchev – Radnički Pirot (2019–2020)
- Todor Ivanov – Radnički Pirot (1982–1986)
- **Zoran Janković** – Železnik (1994–1998), Inđija (2008–2011)
- Veljko Jelenković – Kabel Novi Sad (2021–(2022)
- Ivan Marinov – Radnički Kragujevac (1995–1996)
- Mincho Minchev – Radnički Beograd (1990–1992)
- Preslav Petrov – Grafičar Beograd (2020–2021)
- **Dragoljub Simonović** – RFK Novi Sad (199_–1997)
- Zanko Stoichkov – Šumadija Aranđelovac (1974–1975)
- **Zlatomir Zagorčić** – RFK Novi Sad (1996–1997, 2004–2005)

== Burkina Faso ==
- **Issouf Compaoré** – Banat Zrenjanin (2009–2011)
- **Dramane Salou** – Teleoptik (2018–2019)

== Cameroon ==
- Theophile Abanda - OFK Mladenovac (2005–2006)
- Thierry Ako – Spartak Subotica (2003–2005, 2007–2008), Inđija (2008–2009), Proleter Novi Sad (2009–2010), Zemun (2010–2011), Radnički Sombor (2011–2012), RFK Novi Sad (2012–2013), BSK Borča (2013–2014)
- Thierry Ekwalla – Čukarički Stankom (2004–2006)
- Lionel Abate Etoundi – OFK Žarkovo (2019–2021)
- Fokim Fon Fondo – Radnik Surdulica (2013–2014)
- Ferdinand Fru Fon – Temnić Varvarin (2017–2018)
- Simon Tjeck Migne – Sloboda Užice (2018–2019)
- Michel Vaillant – Napredak Kruševac (2014–2015), Trayal Kruševac (2018–2019), Budućnost Dobanovci (2020–2021)
- **Ibrahim Walidjo** – Javor Ivanjica (2012–2015), ČSK Pivara (2017–2018), Loznica (2020–2022)

== Canada ==
- Nikola Borjan – **Zemun** (2024–present)
- Milan Božić – Hajduk Beograd (2002–2005), Inđija (2006–2007)
- Nikola Bursać - Radnički Sremska Mitrovica (2021-2022)
- **Derek Cornelius** – Javor Ivanjica (2016–2019)
- Luka Gluščević – Radnički Sremska Mitrovica (2023–2024)
- Erik Hermanns – Budućnost Dobanovci (2021–2022), Radnički Beograd (2022–2023)
- Boban Kajgo – Hajduk Beograd (2007–2011)
- Steve Knezevic – Budućnost Dobanovci (2016–2017)
- Jovan Lučić – Bežanija (2016–2017), Budućnost Dobanovci (2020–present), Rad Beograd (2021–2022)
- Aleksa Marković – Zemun (2015–2016), Inđija (2017)–2018)
- Filip Prostran – Mladost Apatin (2009–2010)
- Igor Prostran – Remont Čačak (2002–2004)
- **Mike Stojanovic** – Radnički Kragujevac (1969–1973) – ( (Socialist Federal Republic of Yugoslavia) when active)
- Josh Tucker – **Grafičar Beograd** (2023–present)
- Kai Tucker – Rad Beograd (2022–2023), Radnički Beograd (2023)–2024), Radnički Sremska Mitrovica (2023–2024), **Smederevo** (2024–present)

== Chad ==
- **Misdongarde Betolngar** – Mladost Lučani (2012–2014), Borac Čačak (2013–(2014), Sloga Kraljevo (2014–2015)

== Chile ==
- Sebastián Guerrero – Sinđelić Beograd (2013–2014)

== China ==
- Chi Jiahong – Metalac G.M. (2019–2020)
- Deng Yanlin – Zemun (2019–2020)
- jiahui Wang – Trayal Kruševac (2024–2025)
- Lai Qirui – **Sinđelić Beograd** (2018–present)
- Li Siqi – Smederevo (2019)–2020)
- Liu Bin – Bežanija (2017–2018)
- Liu Bo – Sinđelić Beograd (2013–2014)
- Long Junyuan – **Sloboda Užice** (2024–present)
- Pan Qi – Jagodina (2016–2017)
- Qizhen Han – **Borac Čačak** (2024–present)
- Su Yuliang – **Grafičar Beograd** (2023–present)
- Talepeng Yesidawulieti – **Rad Beograd** (2022–present)
- Tan Jiajie – **Sinđelić Beograd** (2018–present)
- Yimuran Kuerban – **Sinđelić Beograd** (2018–present)
- Wang Jiahui – Sloga Kraljevo (2020-2021), **Trayal Kruševac** (2022–present)
- Wang Lei – Temnić Varvarin (2017–2018)
- Yang Chenyu – Radnički Pirot (2017–2018)
- Yang Ziqi – **Sloboda Užice** (2024–present)
- Yao Xuchen – Radnički Pirot (2017–2018)
- Yuhao Wang – Sloboda Užice (2018–2019)
- Zeng Qingshen – Smederevo (2019–2020)
- Zhang Yue – Bežanija (2018)–2019), **Sinđelić Beograd** (2018–present)
- Zhang Wu – Temnić Varvarin (2017–2018), Trayal Kruševac (2018–2019)
- Zhong Haoran – Proleter Novi Sad (2016–2017)
- Zhu Zhengyu – BSK Borča (2016–2017)

== Colombia ==
- Juan Esteban Mina – Metalac G.M. (2023–2024)

== Congo ==
- **Prestige Mboungou** – Metalac G.M. (2019–2021, 2021–2022)

== Congo D.R. ==
- Mani Banga – **Radnički Beograd** (2023–present)

== Côte d'Ivoire ==
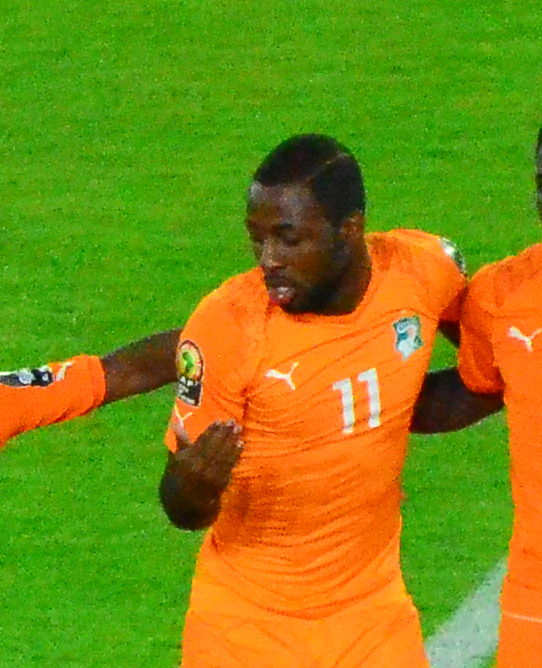
Junior Tallo, Ivorian international, joined Dubočica in 2024.

- Herve Amani – Radnički Kragujevac (2017–2018), Javor Ivanjica (2018–2019)
- Achille Anani – Dinamo Vranje (2015–2016)
- Kouao Desire Bako – Budućnost Dobanovci (2020–2021)
- Alassane Diaby – Dinamo Vranje (2015–2016)
- Modibo Kané Diarra – ČSK Pivara (2006–2007)
- Ismaël Béko Fofana – IMT Beograd (2020–2021)
- Ferdinand Kanga – **Loznica** (2022–present)
- Bayéré Junior Loué – Železničar Pančevo (2021–2022), **Javor Ivanjica** (2023–present)
- Ismaël Maïga – **RFK Novi Sad** (2023–present)
- Marcel Metoua – Banat Zrenjanin (2008–2011)
- Adonija Ouanda – Metalac G.M. (2023–2024), **Voždovac** (2024–present)
- **Mohamed Sylla** – Radnički Sremska Mitrovica (2021–2022)
- **Junior Tallo** – Dubočica Leskovac (2023–2024)
- Aboubacar Toure – Timok Zaječar (2021–2022)
- Mouhamed Tidjane Traore – **Voždovac** (2024–present)

== Croatia ==
The players that have played for the Croatia National Team are in **bold**, the others have played since 1992.

- Predrag Alić – Napredak Kruševac (2010–2011)
- Vedran Bjelajac – Proleter Zrenjanin (2003–2006)
- Matteo Brdar – Inđija (2013–2015)
- Dražen Cvjetković – Čukarički Stankom (1991–1994), Spartak Subotica (2001–2007)
- **Ivan Cvjetković** – Rad Beograd (1985–1987)
- Damjan Daničić – Grafičar Beograd (2018–2019)
- Dragan Dobrić – Dinamo Vranje (2010–2011)
- Stevica Dujaković – Rad Beograd (2003–2005)
- Duško Dukić – Vlasina (2006–2007), Jagodina (2007–2008, 2010–2014, 2016–2017)
- Nikola Gavrić – Sloboda Užice (2018–2019)
- Boris Gospojević – Proleter Novi Sad (2010–2011)
- Ronald Habi – OFK Kikinda (1996–1998)
- Marko Iharoš – Radnički Beograd (2022–2023)
- Nebojša Ivančević – Inđija (2017–2019), Radnički Kragujevac (2019–2020), Budućnost Dobanovci (2020)–2021)
- Miro Ivković – Napredak Kruševac (2005–2006)
- Radovan Ivković – Bačka Bačka Palanka (2008–2010, 2012–2018)
- Srđan Ivković – Bačka Bačka Palanka (2014–2015)
- Ilija Knezić – Big Bull Radnički (2010–2011)
- Mislav Komorski — Zlatibor Čajetina (2022–2023)
- **Ardian Kozniku** – Priština (1988–1990)
- Dario Krivokuća – Inđija (2012–2015)
- Noah Kudić – OFK Beograd (2022–2023), Tekstilac Odžaci (2023–2024)
- Slaven Lakić – Radnički Sombor (2001–2006, 2009–2014, 2018–2022)
- Denis Lazinica – Spartak Subotica (2008–2009)
- Jurica Lovrić – Loznica (2022–2023)
- Darko Lunc – Železničar Pančevo (2021–2023)
- Davor Magoč – ČSK Pivara (2004–2008, 2009–2010), RFK Novi Sad (2011–2012)
- Denis Malešević – Kabel Novi Sad (1999–2000)
- Slavko Mandić – Bor (1998–1999)
- Dušan Martić – Mladost Apatin (2005–2007)
- Boris Miljković – Sinđelić Niš (2007–2011)
- Todor Mizdrak – OFK Mladenovac (2010–2012), Smederevo (2013–201x)
- Arian Mršulja – Smederevo (2019–2020), OFK Vršac (2022–2023)
- Miroslav Pavlović – ČSK Pivara (2001–2004, 2004–2011, 2013–2014), Budućnost Banatski Dvor (2004)–2005)
- Predrag Počuča – BSK Borča (2016–2017), Inđija (2017)–2018), Sinđelić Beograd (2017–(2018)
- Uroš Puskas – Srem S. Mitrovica (2011–2012), RFK Novi Sad (2012–2013)
- Nikola Rudnicki – Banat Zrenjanin (2009–2010, 2013–2014), RFK Novi Sad (2010–2011)
- **Kujtim Shala** – Liria Prizren (1981–1983), Priština (1984–1989)
- Zoran Stamenić – ČSK Pivara (1998–2004, 2004–2006), Mladost Apatin (2005–2007)
- Dragan Trešnjić – Spartak Subotica (2003–2005)
- Mile Vujasin – Inđija (2011–2013, 2015–2018), Radnički Kragujevac (2018–2019), Kolubara Lazarevac (2019–2020)

== Cyprus ==
- Konstantinos Evripidou – OFK Beograd (2023–2024)
- **Siniša Gogić** – Radnički Niš (1982–1986)
- Nemanja Kerkez – **Jedinstvo Ub** (2023–present)
- Alexander Spoljaric – OFK Beograd (2014–2017)
- **Vladan Tomić** – Mačva Šabac (1988–1989)

== Czech Republic ==
- Vladan Binić – Radnik Surdulica (2014–2015)
- Karlo Brener – PSVD (1900) – ( (Bohemia) when active)
- Gustav Greifahr – Soko Beograd (1896) – ( (Bohemia) when active)
- Marko Stanojkoviĉ – Dinamo Vranje (2020–2021)
- Zdeněk Vořechovský – Remont Čačak (2002–2003)

== Denmark ==
- Michael Hansen Schon – ČSK Pivara (2009–2010)
- Dimitrije Vasiljevic – Žarkovo (2015–2016)

== Ecuador ==
- Augusto Batioja – RFK Novi Sad (2009–2010)

== El Salvador ==
- **Vladan Vicevic** – Sloboda Užice (1986–1992, 1999–2002) – ( (Socialist Federal Republic of Yugoslavia) when active)

== England ==
- Benjamin Agyeman-Badu – Sloboda Užice (2017–2018)
- Andre Edionhon – **Radnički Beograd** (2023–present)
- Kal Malass – Timok Zaječar (2021–2022)
- Stefan Vukoje – Sloboda Užice (2022–2023)

== Estonia ==
- German Šlein – **Smederevo** (2024–present)

== France ==
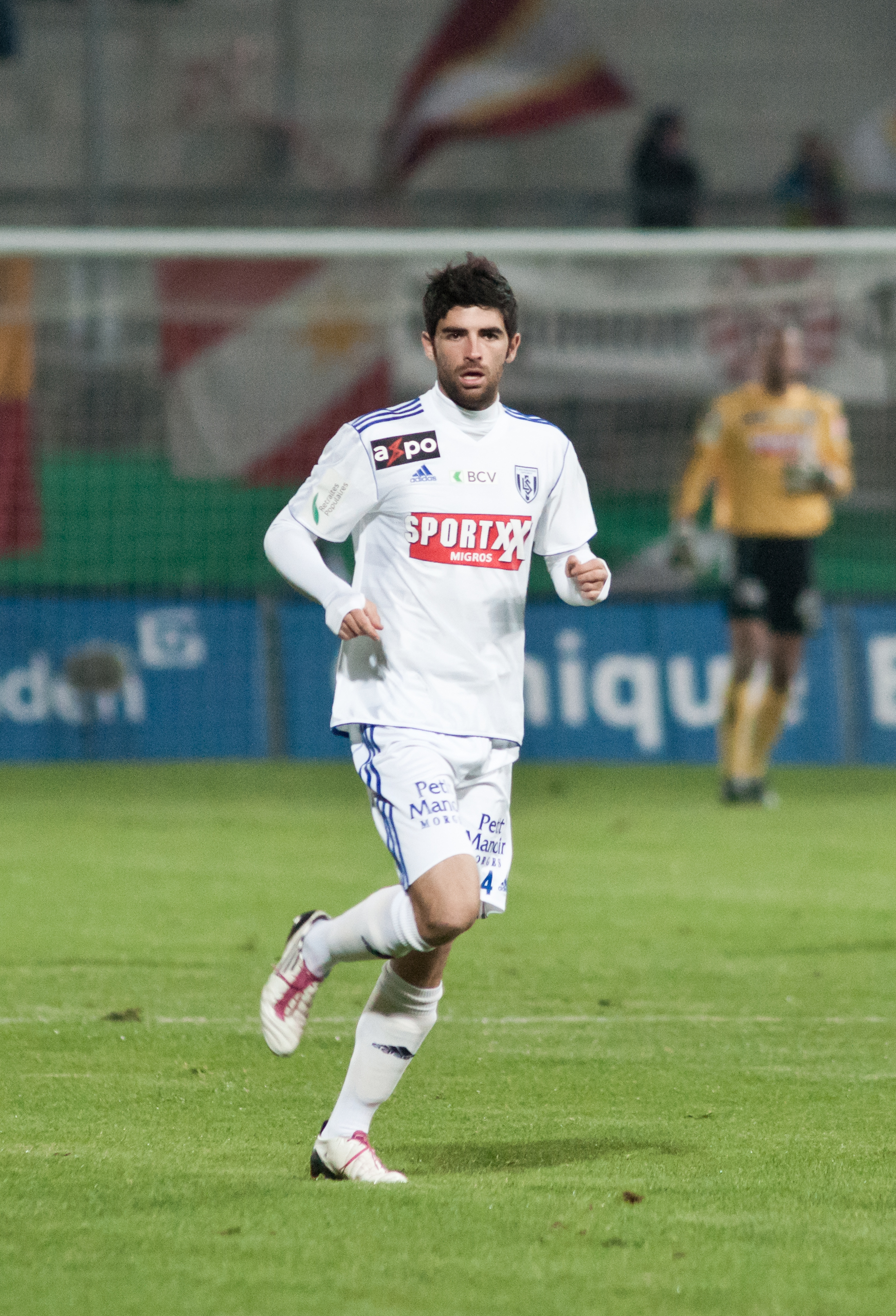
Marko Muslin played with Hajduk Beograd.

- Loic Akpo – Dinamo Vranje (2020–2021)
- Enzo Baglieri – Sloboda Užice (2024–2025)
- Mohamed Bangoura – Jagodina (2020–2021)
- Mathias Dimizas – Dinamo Vranje (2016–2017)
- Boubacari Doucouré – **Javor Ivanjica** (2020–2021, 2022–present)
- David Marinković – Banat Zrenjanin (2012–2015), Bačka Bačka Palanka (2015–2016)
- Marko Muslin – Hajduk Beograd (2003–2004)
- Hugo Rouxel – Inđija (2022–2023)

== Gambia ==
- Abdou Faye – Trayal Kruševac (2019)–2020)
- Adama Jarjue – Sloga Kraljevo (2020–2021)
- Lamin Jobe – Trayal Kruševac (2018–2020)
- Ousman Joof – Trayal Kruševac (2018–2021, 2022–2023)
- Ousman Marong – Trayal Kruševac (2018–2019), Grafičar Beograd (2019–2020,2020–2021)

== Georgia ==
- Revaz Injgia – Radnički Sremska Mitrovica (2020–2021)
- Artur Mkrtichyan – ČSK Pivara (2016–2018)
- Imeda Putkaradze – Novi Pazar (2010–2011)
- Akaki Tskarozia – Bežanija (2008–2010)
- **Davit Volkovi** – Zemun (2016–2017)

== Germany ==
- Daniel Arsovic – Čukarički Stankom (200_–200_)
- Mirko Bulatović - Teleoptik (2018-2019)
- Milan Delević – Žarkovo (2021–2022), Loznica (2022)-2023), **IMT Beograd** (2022–present)
- Aleksandar Erak – TSC Bačka Topola (2016–2019), Bečej (2018)–2019)
- Johann Graf – Palilulac Beograd (1932–1933) – ( (Nazi Germany) when active)
- Luis Jakobi – **Sloboda Užice** (2024–present)
- Marko Karamarko – Dubočica Leskovac (2023–2024)
- Stefan Kukoljac – Sinđelić Beograd (2016–2017)
- Irsen Latifović – Novi Pazar (1995–1996), Napredak Kruševac (1996–1997)
- Danijel Milovanović – Bežanija (2008–2009)
- Marko Mišković – Bežanija (2015–2019)
- Karl Otterbein – Bačka Subotica (193x–1949) – ( (Nazi Germany) when active)
- Aleksandro Petrovic – Zemun (2006–2008)
- Matthias Predojević – RFK Novi Sad (1997)–1998), Milicionar Beograd (1997–1999), Javor Ivanjica (2000–2002)
- Maksim Rajković – **Tekstilac Odžaci** (2023–present)
- Thomas Vasov – Timok Zaječar (19__–1993), Borac Čačak (1993–1996)
- Marc Phillipp Wessner – Dinamo Vranje (2020–2021)

== Ghana ==
- Jacob Aboosah – OFK Beograd (2023–2024), **Grafičar Beograd** (2024–present)
- Rashid Abubakar - **Loznica** (2022–present)
- Sadick Abubakar – Smederevo (2019–2020), Radnički Sremska Mitrovica (2020–2022), **Radnik Surdulica** (2022–present)
- Seedorf Agyemang – **Sloboda Užice** (2024–present)
- Abdul Alhassan – Grafičar Beograd (2021–2022)
- Johnson Amuzu – Radnički Sremska Mitrovica (2023–2024), **Javor Ivanjica** (2024–present)
- Herbert Ansah – **Vršac** (2024–present)
- Bosiako Francis Antwi – **Radnički Sremska Mitrovica** (2024–present)
- **Yaw Antwi** – Bežanija (2012–2013), Timok Zaječar (2013–2014), Inđija (2014–2017)
- Bismarck Appiah – Sloga Petrovac na Mlavi (2013–2015), Proleter Novi Sad (2016–2017)
- Stephen Appiah – Trayal Kruševac (2018–2019)
- Melvin Banda – Sloga Petrovac na Mlavi (2013–2015)
- Joseph Bempah – Sloboda Užice (2018–2019), Radnički Pirot (2019–2020), Borac Čačak (2020–2021)
- Ronal Bortey – Srem S.Mitrovica (2010–2011)
- **Francis Bossman** – Sloboda Užice (2010–2012, 2014–2015), Sloga Petrovac na Mlavi (2013–2014)
- Joseph Cudjoe – Radnik Surdulica (2013–2015)
- Abraham Frimpong – Napredak Kruševac (2011–2017)
- Alidu Harif Mohammed – Napredak Kruševac (2013–2014)
- Kwaku Karikari - Jedinstvo Ub (2022–2024)
- Owusu-Ansah Kontoh – Metalac G.M. (2011–2015)
- Andy Francis Kumi – **Vršac** (2023–present)
- Maxwell Mensah – Temnić Varvarin (2017–2018)
- Abdul Majeed Muiz – Grafičar Beograd (2021–2022), Metalac G.M. (2022–2023)
- Baba Musah – Trayal Kruševac (2018–2021)
- Ibrahim Mustapha – Radnički Sremska Mitrovica (2021–2022)
- Justice Neequaye – Sloboda Užice (2018–2019)
- Abdul Rashid Obuobi – Sloga Kraljevo (2013–2014), Donji Srem (2014–2016), Borac Čačak (2020–2021), Zlatibor Čajetina (2021–2022)
- Kuadwo Opoku Ansah – **OFK Beograd** (2023–present)
- **Godwin Osei Bonsu** – Radnik Surdulica (2013–2014)
- Douglas Owusu – **Radnik Surdulica** (2024–present)
- **Samuel Owusu** – Radnik Surdulica (2014–2016)
- **Maxwell Quaye** - Loznica (2022-2023)
- Obeng Regan – Napredak Kruševac (2012–2014), Železničar Pančevo (2021–2023), RFK Novi Sad (2022–(2023)
- Zakaria Suraka – Sloga Petrovac na Mlavi (2013–2014), Inďija (2014–2015), Dinamo Vranje (2016–2019), Železničar Pančevo (2020–2021)
- Ibrahim Tanko – Bežanija (2018–2019), Javor Ivanjica (2020–2024)
- **Abdul Razak Yusif** – Železničar Pančevo (2024–present)
- Ibrahim Zubairu - Jedinstvo Ub (2022–2024)

== Greece ==
- Nikolaos Antoniadis – Kabel Novi Sad (2021–2022)
- Theodoros Apostolidis – Bor (1969–1972)
- Konstantinos Galeadis – Radnički Pirot (2019–2020)
- Anastasio Galinis – Radnički Obrenovac (2004–2005)
- Dimitris Koxidis – Sloga Kraljevo (2013–2014)
- Lefteris Matsoukas – Dinamo Vranje (2018–2020)
- Todor Mistakidis – Bačka Subotica
- Yiannis Nestoras – ČSK Pivara (2016–2018)
- Asterios Oikonomikos – Dinamo Vranje (2020–2021), Zlatibor Čajetina (2021–2022)
- Athanasios Stoinovits - Zlatibor Čajetina (2022-2023)
- Dimitrios Tsinovits – **IMT Beograd** (2017–2018,2019–present), Sinđelić Beograd (2018–2019)

== Guatemala ==
- Adolfo Alvarez – ČSK Pivara (2017–2018)

== Guinea ==
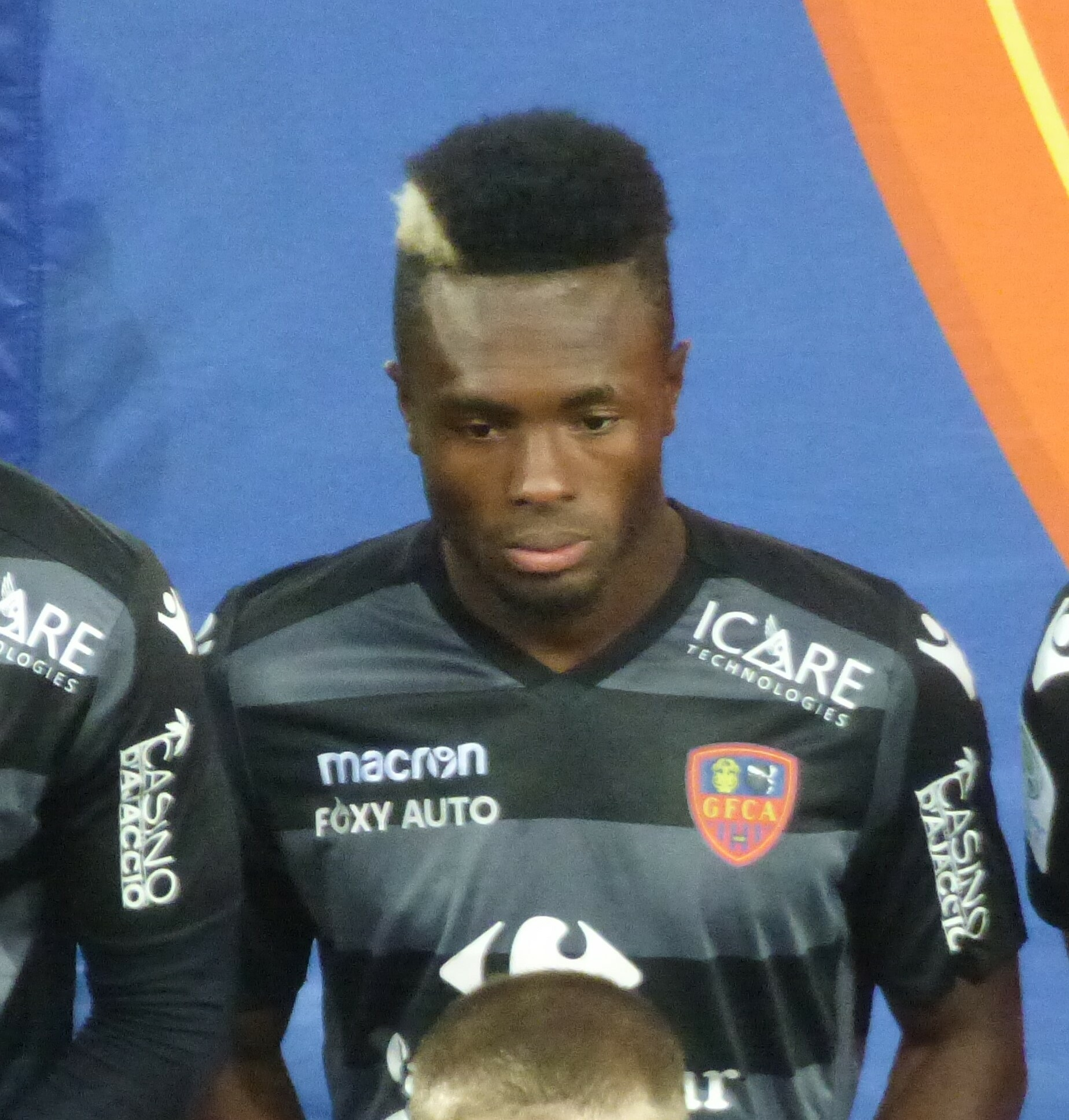
Fodé Camara, played with Novi Sad in 2023.

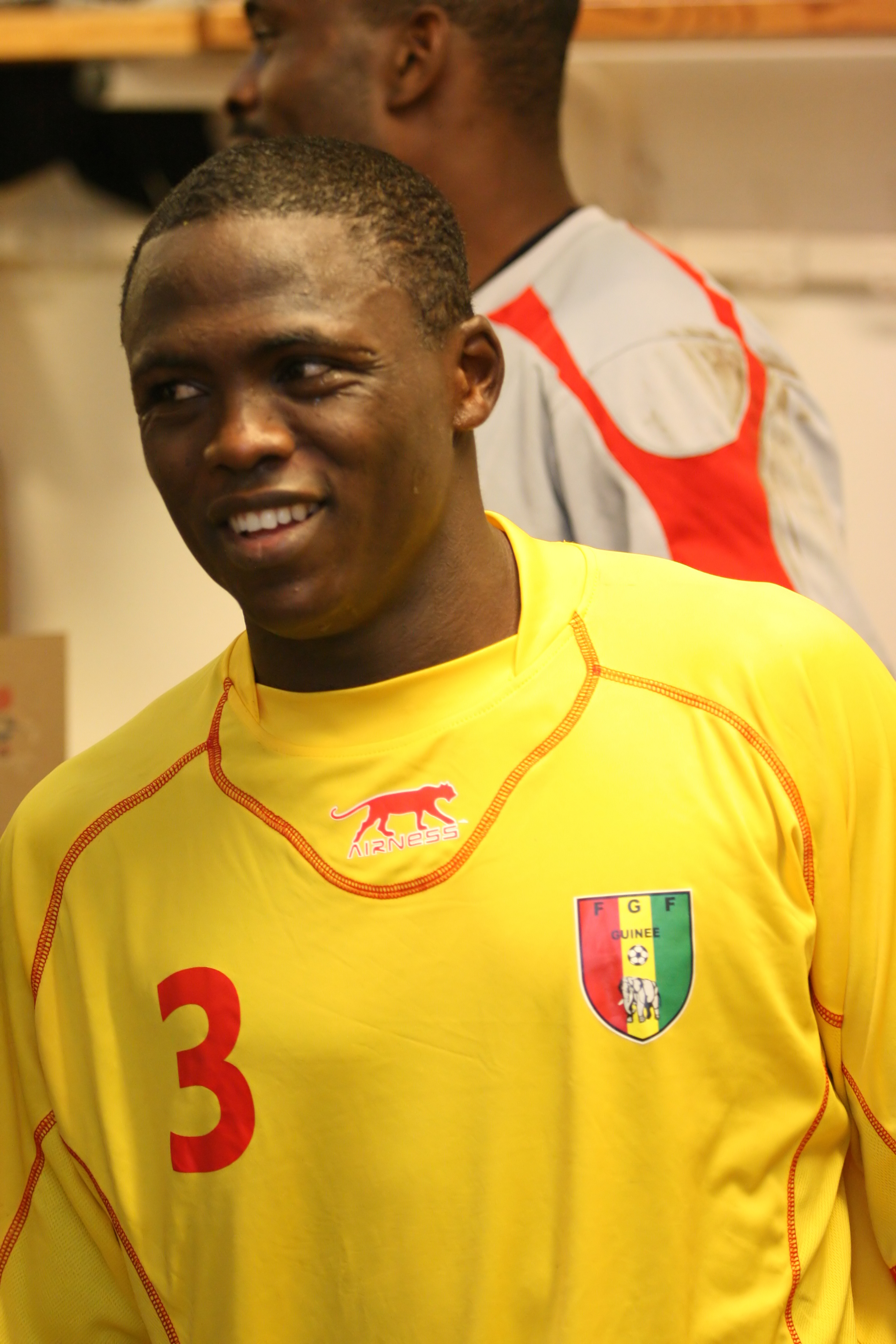
Ibrahima Sory Camara played with Zemun in 2016.

- Amadou Bailo – Novi Pazar (2010–2011)
- Fodé Camara – RFK Novi Sad (2022–2023)
- **Ibrahima Sory Camara** – Zemun (2015–2016)
- Aly Soumah – Dubočica Leskovac (2024–2025)

== Honduras ==
- **Luis López** – Srem S.Mitrovica (2010)–2011), Novi Pazar (2010–(2011)

== Hong Kong ==
- **Dejan Antonić** – Napredak Kruševac (1990–1992) – ( (Socialist Federal Republic of Yugoslavia) when active)
- **Anto Grabo** – RFK Novi Sad (1986–1988) – ( (Socialist Federal Republic of Yugoslavia) when active)
- Enson Kwok – Timok Zaječar (2021–2022), Mačva Šabac (2022–2023)

== Hungary ==
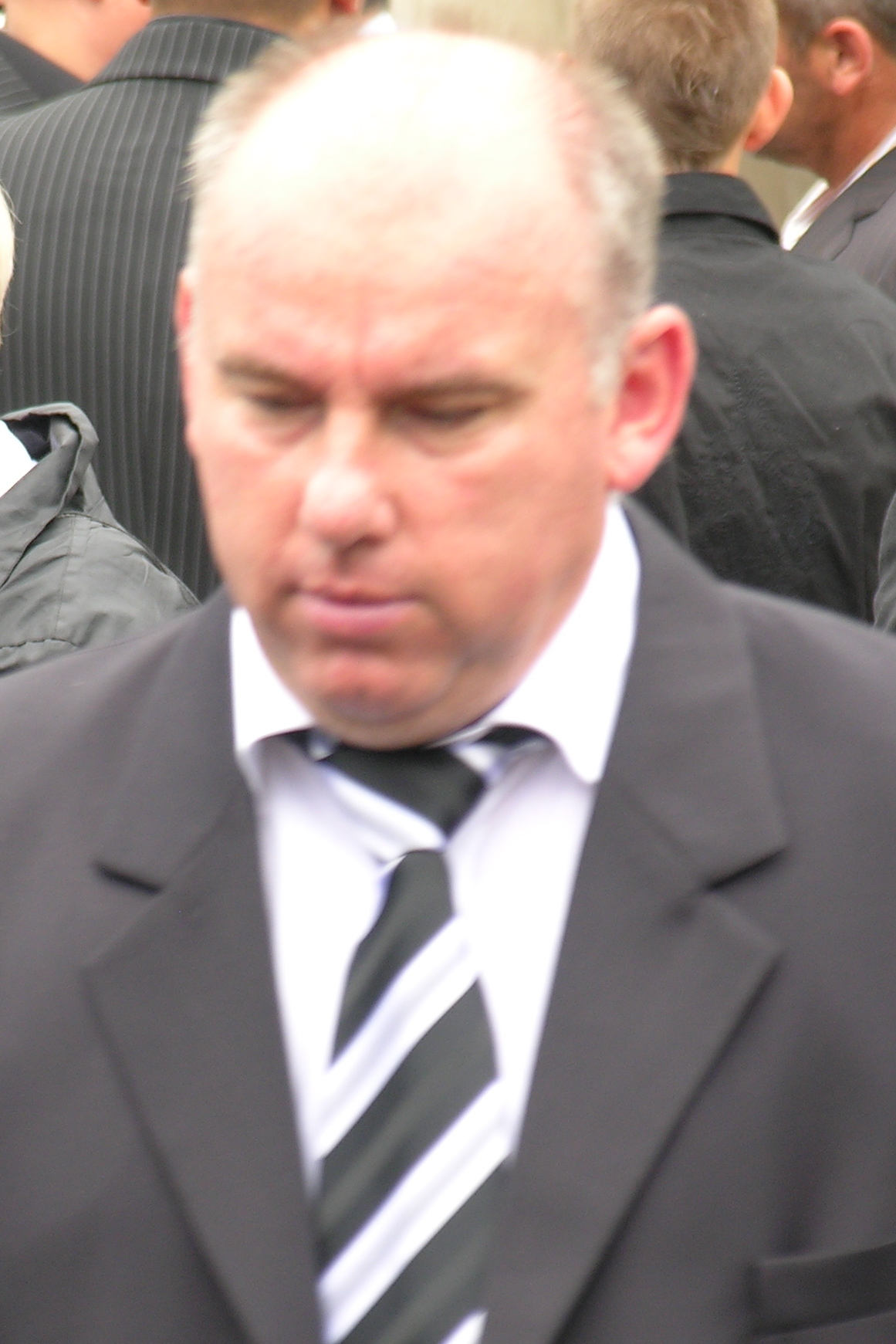
Krizán, OFK Kikinda in 1990/91.

- János Báki – Kabel Novi Sad (1937–1941)
- **Predrag Bošnjak** – RFK Novi Sad (2006–2008), Proleter Novi Sad (2009–2010)
- Zoltán Búrány – Spartak Subotica (200_–2006)
- Gyula Ellbogen – Juda Makabi (1922–1923), Sparta Zemun (1923)
- István Gligor – Spartak Subotica (1974–1976), FK Crvenka (1977–1978), OFK Kikinda (1979–1980)
- Zoltán Horváth – Spartak Subotica (1983–1986)
- Zoltan Inotai – Sport Subotica (1921–192x), Juda Makabi (193x–193x)
- **Zsombor Kerekes** – FK Bečej (1990–1996)
- László Köteles – FK Bežanija (2004–2005)
- Sándor Krizán – OFK Kikinda (1990–1991)
- László Némedi – FK Bor (1959–1961)
- Károly Nemes – NAK Novi Sad (1919–1924)
- **István Nyers** – ŽAK Subotica (1941–1945)
- Norbert Pintér – TSC Bačka Topola (2018–2019)
- **Ferenc Plattkó** – KAFK Kula (1921–1923)
- Adrián Potloka – OFK Kikinda (200_–2007)
- Zsolt Radics – Mladost Apatin (199_–1998)
- **Vilmos Sipos** – Građanski S.Mitrovica (1930–1931)
- Tojvas – ŽAK Subotica (1924–1925)
- László Varga – Bačka Subotica (1941–1949)

== India ==
- Dhruv Vikram Singh - Timok Zaječar (2021–2022)
- Rahul Soni – Žarkovo (2018–2019), Borac Čačak (2020-2021)

== Indonesia ==
- **Ilija Spasojević** – ČSK Pivara (2006–2007)

== Iran ==
- Houtan Delfi – Proleter Novi Sad (2011–2014)

== Iraq ==
- **Ibrahim Salim Saad** – Dubočica Leskovac (2000–2001)
- Mohamad Shamkhi – Budućnost Dobanovci (2021–2022)

== Israel ==
- **Slobodan Drapić** – RFK Novi Sad (1984–1986)

== Italy ==
- Stefano Andreata – Inđija (2012–2015)
- Antonio Balduini – Bor (1953–1955)
- Arnoldo Balduini – Bor (1953–1954)
- Gaston Balduini – Bor (1952–1954)
- Giovanni Balduini – Bor (1920–192_)
- Arbri Dedja – Inđija (2014–2016)
- Stefan Dimitrijević – Grafičar Beograd (2022–2023), Mačva Šabac (2023–2024)

== Jamaica ==
- **Norman Campbell** – Grafičar Beograd (2020–2021)
- Duncan McKenzie - **Grafičar Beograd** (2022–present)

== Japan ==
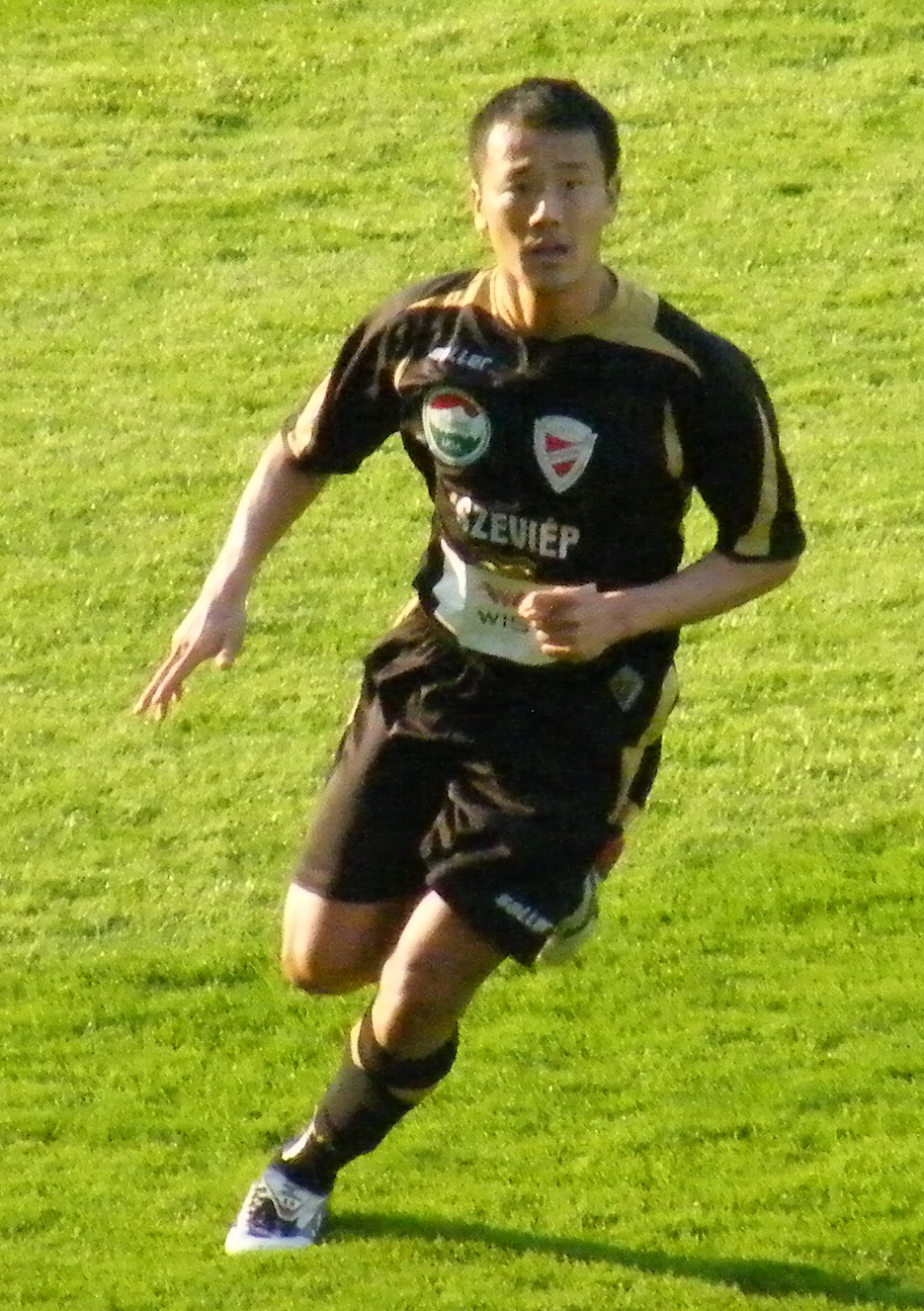
Kazuo Honma, Mačva Šabac.

- Kazuo Honma – Mačva Šabac (2003–2005)
- Yu Horike – **Dubočica Leskovac** (2024–present)
- Hiroya Kiyomoto – Zlatibor Čajetina (2019–2020)
- Hikaru Matsui – **Kolubara Lazarevac** (2023–present)
- Ryohei Michibuchi – **Smederevo** (2024–present)
- Gentaro Murakami – Jagodina (2016–2017)
- Yuto Nakamura – Tekstilac Odžaci (2023–2024)
- Yuma Suwa – **Kolubara Lazarevac** (2023–present)
- Ryo Tachibana – Zlatibor Čajetina (2019–2020)
- Masatsusami Takara – **Dubočica Leskovac** (2024–present)
- Masafumi Takatsuka (Mabo) – Bane Raška (2002–2005)
- Yoshikato Uchino – Mačva Šabac (2002–2005)
- Takuto Yasuoka – OFK Beograd (2016–2017)
- Noriyuki Yokochi – Radnički Sremska Mitrovica (2024–1015)

== Kazakhstan ==
- **Nenad Erić** – Big Bul Bačinci (2002–2003), Mačva Šabac (2003–2005)
- Izat Kulzhanov – Radnički Kragujevac (2020–2021)

== Kenya ==
- Brian Berry Odhiambo – Inđija (2012–2013)
- Albert Muema – Sinđelić Beograd (2017–2019)
- **Richard Odada** – Grafičar Beograd (2019–2020)

== Korea, Republic ==
- Hwang Jong-won – Radnički Kragujevac (2018)–2019), OFK Žarkovo (2018–(2019), Smederevo (2019–2020)
- Jang Hyeok-jin – Sloga Kraljevo (2014–2015)
- Jo Min-se – ČSK Pivara (2017–2018)
- Kim Chang-seong – Sloga Kraljevo (2013–2014)
- Kim Do-hyun – Bežanija (2017–2018)
- Kim Seon-il – Radnički Niš (2011–2012)
- Kim Young-moon – Sloga Kraljevo (2014–2015)
- Lee Gee-hyeon – Zlatibor Čajetina (2019)–2020), Trayal Kruševac (2019–(2020)
- Lee Je-myeong – Sloga Kraljevo (2013–2014)
- Lee Jong-chan – Budućnost Dobanovci (2020–2021), **Rad Beograd** (2021–present)
- Lee Joon-so - Zemun (2019-2020)
- Lee San-hyeon – Bežanija (2007–2010)
- Lim Chang-jong – Radnički Nova Pazova (2012–2013)
- Myeong Se-jin – **Sloboda Užice** (2023–present)
- Park Chan-sol – Bežanija (2016–2018)
- Park Ji-han – Bežanija (2014–2015)
- Park Tae-gyu – Bežanija (2007–2010)
- Sang Ghyeok-seo – Sloga Kraljevo (2014–2015)
- Shim Tae-soo – Sloboda Užice (2017–2018)
- Son Joon-hyo – Bežanija (2017–2018)
- Woo Chun-yong – Mladost Apatin (2009–2010)
- Yu Dong-gyu – Bežanija (2014–2016), ČSK Pivara (2017–2018)
- Yoon Sang-young – BSK Borča (2016–201x)
- Yun Tae-ho – Inđija (2014–2015)

== Kosovo ==
Counting only clubs outside Kosovo, or inside Kosovo for internationals before declaration of independence.

- Edin Ahmeti – OFK Mladenovac (2006–2007)
- Halil Asani – ČSK Pivara (1997–2000, 2002–2007), Proleter Novi Sad (2007–2012)
- Filip Berisha – Budućnost Dobanovci (2018–2019)
- Amir Bislimi – Proleter Novi Sad (2008–2010)
- **Enis Fetahu** – Bor (2003–2004)
- Sead Gorani – Železnik (1998–2001)
- Muhamed Ilazi – Dubočica Leskovac (2001–2006, 2008–2013)
- **Besnik Kollari** – Novi Pazar (1995–1996)
- Rahmani Kurti – Novi Pazar (1995–1996)
- Shefqet Kurti – Novi Pazar (1995–1996)
- Memiš Limani – RFK Novi Sad (1991–1992)
- Enes Maliqi – ZSK Valjevo (2001–2002), FK Beograd (2002–2010)
- Ajazdin Nuhi – Čukarički Stankom (1997–2001)
- Hajzerdzan Ramadani – Palilulac Beograd (1997–1998)
- Edi Sulejmani – Palilulac Beograd (1998–1999)

== Kuwait ==
- **Ahmad Al-Saqer** – Sinđelić Beograd (2017–2018)

== Kyrgyzstan ==
- **Viktor Kelm** – Bežanija (2016–2017)

== Latvia ==
- **Aleksejs Grjaznovs** – Mladost GAT (2024–2025),, **Mladost GAT** (2024–present)
- **Oļegs Karavajevs** – OFK Beograd (1990–1993)
- **Eduards Tīdenbergs** – **Dubočica Leskovac** – (2024–present)

== Lebanon ==
- Muhamad Jawad Abdallah – Budućnost Dobanovci (2018–2019)

== Lesotho ==
- **Thapelo Tale** – Srem S.Mitrovica (2011–2012)

== Liberia ==
- **Omega Roberts** – Donji Srem (2015–2016,2021–2023), Žarkovo (2018)–2019), Novi Pazar (2018–(2019), Budućnost Dobanovci (2019–2020)

== Lithuania ==
- Tomas Dapkus – Dinamo Vranje (2015–2016)

== Libya ==
- Mahdi Majid – Donji Srem (2015–2017)

== Malaysia ==
- Adam Bin Hamid – IMT Beograd (2020–2021)
- Omar Raiyan - Grafičar Beograd (2022–2023)

== Mali ==
- Issa Hare Diawara – Zemun (2015–2017)

== Malta ==
- **Mattia Veselji** – **Smederevo** (2024–present)
- **Nenad Veselji** – OFK Beograd (1988–1994)
- Jamie Zerafa – Inđija (2018–2019)

== Moldova ==
- Sergiu Diulgher – Sloboda Užice (2018–2019)
- Alexandru Gutium –'Javor Ivanjica (2024–2025)
- Dimitrie Moşneagă – Mladi Radnik (2010–2011)

== Mongolia ==
- **Murun Altankhuyag** – Mačva Šabac (2014–2015)

== Montenegro ==
Incomplete

- Zoran Aković – **Novi Pazar** (2018–present)
- Danilo Bracanović – Zlatibor Čajetina (2019–2020)
- Božidar Bujiša – **Zlatibor Čajetina** (2019–present)
- Bojan Bulatović – **Novi Pazar** (2018–present)
- Drago Bumbar – **Sinđelić Beograd** (2018–present)
- Stefan Dabetić – FK Voždovac (2011–2013)
- Mitar Ćuković – **Proleter Novi Sad** (2017–present)
- Danilo Dašić – Zlatibor Čajetina (2019–2020)
- Marko Despotović – **FK Bežanija** (2018–present)
- Marko Drašković – BASK Beograd (2017–(2018), Sloga Despotovac (2018–2019), Borac Šakule (2019)–2020), Borac Čačak (2019–2020), **Trayal Kruševac** (2020–present)
- Lazar Đokić – FK Zemun (2015)–2016), **Dinamo Vranje** (2016–2017, 2018–present), Metalac GM (2017–2018)
- Vuk Đurić – Sloboda Užice (2005–2007, (2011)–2012, 2015–2016), FK Srem (2009–2011), FK Voždovac (2011–2013), **Jedinstvo Putevi** (2013–2015, 2017–present)
- Nikola Gluščević – Proleter Novi Sad (2020–2021), Budućnost Dobanovci (2021–2022), Radnički Beograd (2022–2023), Kolubara Lazarevac (2023–2024)
- Nemanja Gojačanin – Javor Ivanjica (2013–2016)
- Tigran Goranović – Sinđelić Beograd (2016–2017, 2019–2020), Dinamo Vranje (2019–2021)
- Boško Guzina – Bežanija (2017–(2018), **Teleoptik** (2018–present)
- Milovan Ilić – Sloboda Užice (2018–2019)
- Milan Jelovac – Metalac G. M. (2017–2020), **Radnički Sremska Mitrovica** (2020–present)
- **Asmir Kajević** – BSK Borča (2008–2012)
- **Filip Kasalica** - Mačva Šabac (2006-2007), Srem S. Mitrovica (2007-2008), Grafičar Beograd (2022-2023), OFK Beograd (2023–2024), **Grafičar Beograd** (2024–present)
- **Šaleta Kordić** – RFK Novi Sad (2012–2013), BSK Borča (2014–2015), Železničar Pančevo (2022–2024)
- Alija Krnić – **Javor Ivanjica** (2017–present)
- Nikola Krstinić – Banat Zrenjanin (2009–2011, 2013–2016)
- **Nikola Krstović** – Grafičar Beograd (2019–2020)
- Mijat Lambulić - **Grafičar Beograd** (2021–present)
- Krsto Ljubanović – Inđija (2021–2022)
- Bojan Magud – Zemun (2015–2018)
- Marko Medenica - **Metalac G.M.** (2022–present)
- Marko Milikić - Radnički Pirot (2020-(2021), OFK Žarkovo (2021-2022), **Železničar Pančevo** (2022-present)
- Drago Milović – **OFK Žarkovo** (2018–present)
- Filip Mitrović – Novi Pazar (2019–2020)
- Danilo Mugoša – OFK Beograd (2023–2024)
- Sava Mugoša – Sinđelić Beograd (2015)–2016)
- Bojica Nikčević – Radnički Pirot (2019–2020)
- **Nemanja Nikolić** – Grafičar Beograd (2020–2021)
- Petar Pavlićević – **Kabel Novi Sad** (2019–present)
- Nikola Pejović – **Zemun** (2020–present)
- Ognjen Peličić – Sloboda Užice (2017)–2018), **FK Teleoptik** (2018–present)
- Danilo Pešukić – Radnički Beograd (2023–2024)
- Mladen Popović – **Dinamo Vranje** (2019–present)
- Stefan Popović – **Dinamo Vranje** (2019–present)
- Stefan Račković – Bežanija (2014–(2015), Donji Srem (2015–(2016)
- Vasilije Radenović – Kolubara (2013–2016), BSK Borča (2016–2017), Proleter Novi Sad (2017–2018), OFK Žarkovo (2018–2019, 2019–2020)
- Dragoljub Radoman - **Sloboda Užice** (2022–present)
- Aleksandar Radović – Hajduk Beograd (2007–2008)
- **Andrija Radulović** - Grafičar Beograd (2021-2022)
- Bogdan Rmuš – **FK Novi Pazar** (2018–present)
- Peđa Savić – **Teleoptik** (2015–present)
- Petar Sekulović – Teleoptik (2017–2018)
- **Janko Simović** – Metalac G.M. (2007–2008), Dinamo Vranje (2019–2020)
- Marko Stanovčić – FK Bežanija (2009–2012, 2013–2015), FK Inđija (2014–2015)
- Nemanja Šćekić – Sinđelić Beograd (2014–2017), **OFK Žarkovo** (2018–present)
- Tomo Šoc – Sloboda Užice (2022–2023), **Mačva Šabac** (2023–present)
- Boris Tatar – Budućnost Dobanovci (2019–2020)
- Mihailo Tomković – **Zlatibor Čajetina** (2018–present)
- Stefan Vico - **Grafičar Beograd** (2022–present)
- Marko Vidović – **Sloga Kraljevo** (2020–present)
- Filip Vorotović – **FK Teleoptik** (2016–2017, 2018–present)
- Predrag Vujović – Napredak Kruševac (2001–2005, 2007–2010), FK Novi Pazar (2010–2011), FK Metalac G.M. (2012–2014), FK Loznica (2015–2016)
- Bojan Zogović – Radnički Sombor (2007–2009, (2010)–2011) – Banat Zrenjanin (2009–2010, 2010–2011), Timok Zaječar (2012–2014), Metalac G.M. (2014–2016,2017–2018), Bačka Bačka Palanka (2018–2019), **Kolubara Lazarevac** (2020–present)

== Netherlands ==
- Aleksandar Janković – Sloboda Užice (2017–2018)
- Ralph Kerrebijn – Žarkovo (2020–2021), Budućnost Dobanovci (2021–2022)

== New Zealand ==
- **Adam Mitchell** – OFK Beograd (2016)–2017)

== Nigeria ==
- Abel Abah - **Metalac G.M.** (2022–present)
- Sani Abdullahi – **Mačva Šabac** (2023–present)
- Ibrahim Adamu – **Borac Čačak** (2024–present)
- Kazeem Ojo Aderounmu – **Radnički Beograd** (2023–present)
- Hameed Aderoju – **Borac Čačak** (2024–present)
- Victor Agboh – BSK Borča (2001–2002), Žitorađa (2002)–2003), Novi Pazar (2005–2006), Mladost Apatin (2007–2008)
- Nnaemeka Ajuru – Javor Ivanjica (2004–2005, 2006–2009), Jagodina (2017–2018), Sloboda Užice (2018–2019)
- Victor Amos – Sloga Kraljevo (2020–2021), Trayal Kruševac (2022–2023), **Sloboda Užice** (2023–present)
- Justine Aniekwilo – **Radnički Beograd** (2023–present)
- Collins Atule – **Mladost GAT** (2023–present)
- Shedrack Charles - IMT Beograd (2021–2023), Sloboda Užice (2023–2024), **Grafičar Beograd** (2024–present)
- Ayogueke Chibueze – Moravac Orion (2014–2015), Bežanija (2015–2016)
- Eleanya Kelechi Collins – Kolubara Lazarevac (2001–2003), Mladost Apatin (2007–2008)
- Ezeh Chinedu – Kosanica (2004–2008)
- Eugene Ebere – **Grafičar Beograd** (2024–present)
- Emeka Emerun – Sloboda Užice (2015–2017), Radnički Pirot (2017–2018), Budućnost Dobanovci (2018–2022)
- Ikechukwu Ezeh – Hajduk Beograd (2007–2008)
- Yusuf Faisal – **Grafičar Beograd** (2023–present)
- Frederick Famakinwa – Radnički Pirot (2007–2008)
- Ogundele Gbemisola - Kabel Novi Sad (2021–2022)
- Mark Geff – Novi Pazar (2003–2004), Kosanica (2004–2005)
- Ifekwe Godswill – **Temnić Varvarin** (2017–present)
- Stanley Ibe – Javor Ivanjica (2001–2002)
- Ifeanyi Igbodo – BSK Borča (2000–2002), Javor Ivanjica (2002–2004, 2007–2008), FK Beograd (2003–(2004), Vlasina Vlasotince (2004–2005)
- Kennedy Ikporo - IMT Beograd (2022–2023), Radnički Beograd (2023–2024)
- Victor Jideonwor – Javor Ivanjica (2005–2008)
- Moses John – Novi Pazar (2019)–2020), Smederevo (2019–(2020), Sloga Kraljevo (2020–2021)
- Gideon Kadiri – Sloboda Užice (2018–2019)
- Peter Kolawole – Sloboda Užice (2017–2018)
- Anthony Lokosa – Smederevo (2023–2024), **OFK Beograd** (2024–present)
- Adekunle Lukmon – Borac Čačak (2002–2005)
- Damien Maduba – Timok Zaječar (2021–2022)
- Umar Mohammad – Smederevo (2023–2024), **Vršac** (2024–present)
- Abdulahi Muhamedom – **Mačva Šabac** (2023–present)
- Cyril Nebo – Kabel Novi Sad (2019–2021), Jagodina (2020–(2021)
- Kingsley Nnaji – Jagodina (2020–2021), Timok Zaječar (2021–2022)
- Samuel Nnamani – Sloga Petrovac na Mlavi (2013–2014), Donji Srem (2015–2016), Sloboda Užice (2016–2018)
- Augustine Nwagwu – Metalac GM (2017–2018)
- Kelvin Obasi – ČSK Pivara (2017–2018)
- Gabriel Obekpa – IMT Beograd (2022–2023), Tekstilac Odžaci (2023–2024)
- Julius Ochima – **Zlatibor Čajetina** (2022–present)
- Michel Odinakachakwu – Novi Pazar (2007–2008)
- Obiora Odita – Javor Ivanjica (2003–2005, (2006)–2007, (2010)–2011, 2011–2012,2021–2022), **Železničar Pančevo** (2022–present)
- Ugochukwu Oduenyi - Javor Ivanjica (2021–2023)
- Kingsley Chukwudi Ogbonnaya – Srem S.Mitrovica (200_–200_)
- Favour Ogbu – Grafičar Beograd (2023–2024)
- Andy Oregbe Ogede – **Smederevo** (2024–present)
- Ikechukwu Ojukwu – Novi Pazar (2005–2006)
- Martins Okafor – Jagodina (2020–2022), Timok Zajecar (2021–(2022)
- Michael Unadike Ukechukwu – Tekstilac Odžaci (2023–2024)
- Eze Vincent Okeuhie – Metalac GM (2017–2018)
- Livinus Okorie – Sloboda Užice (2018–2019)
- Samson Olasupo – Radnički Sremska Mitrovica (2024–2025)
- Franklin Azubuike Ononaobi aka Frank Doski – Zemun (2015–2016)
- Obele Okeke Onyebuchi – Železničar Beograd (2001–2002), Radnički Kragujevac (2002–2003)
- Reuben Okoro – Sloga Kraljevo (2013–2014), Sloga Petrovac na Mlavi (2014)–2015), Mačva Šabac (2014–2015)
- Emmanuel Oletu – Spartak Subotica (2008–2010)
- Peter Omoduemuke – Obilić (2004–2007)
- Okomajin Segun Onimisi – Sloga Kraljevo (2014)–2015), BSK Borča (2015–2016), Dinamo Vranje (2016–2020), Dubočica Leskovac (2020–2022)
- Lucius Chimeremeze Onwuboro – **Dubočica Leskovac** (2024–present)
- Henry Onyilo – Inđija (2013–2014)
- Peter Taiye Oladotun – Bežanija (2008–2009)
- Elijah Peace – Mačva Šabac (2023–2024)
- Raphael Remingus Governor – Kolubara Lazarevac (2014–2015)
- Kayode Saliman - Zlatibor Čajetina (2022–2023)
- Olatunji Sulaimon Teslim – Inđija (2013–2014)
- Emmanuel Udeh – BSK Borča (2015–2016)
- **Emeka Jude Ugali** – FK Beograd (1998–1999)
- Efe Ugiagbe – Mačva Šabac (2023–2024)
- Dante Charles Ugwu – Moravac Orion (2014–2015)
- Prince Lucky Ukachukwu - IMT Beograd (2022–2023), Tekstilac Odžak (2023–2024)
- Abdul Zubairu – Kolubara Lazarevac (2022–2023)
- Ibrahim Zubairu – Jedinstvo Ub (2023–2024)

== North Macedonia ==
The players that have played for the Macedonian National Team are in **bold**, the others have played since 1992.

- Ahmet Ahmetović – Novi Pazar (1997–1999)
- Muhamet Ajvazi – BSK Borča (2016–2017)
- Fikret Alomerović – Radnički Niš (199_–199_)
- **Marjan Altiparmakovski** – Radnički Beograd (2023–2024)
- Aleksa Amanović – Javor Ivanjica (2015–2020)
- Stefan Andrić – Radnički Kragujevac (2014–2016), **Radnički Beograd** (2022–present)
- Igor Angelovski – Srem S.Mitrovica (2009–2010)
- **Stefan Aškovski** – Teleoptik (2009–2012)
- Boban Avramovski – Kolubara Lazarevac (2008–2009)
- Sava Avramovski – Grafičar Beograd (2021–2023)
- Vlado Blazeski – Sloga Kraljevo (2001–2005)
- Nikola Bogdanovski – Bežanija (2018–2019), OFK Žarkovo (2019)–2020), Novi Pazar (2019–2020, 2022–2024), **Zemun** (2024–present)
- **Dragan Čadikovski** – Kolubara Lazarevac (1997–2001, 2014–2015, 2016–2019)
- Cvetanovski – Bežanija (2001–2002)
- Ivica Cvetanovski – Sloboda Užice (1989–1993, 1993–1996)
- Olivio Dautovski – Topličanin Prokuplje (1989–1995)
- **Filip Despotovski** – Bežanija (2004–2005), Mačva Šabac (2005–2007)
- Stefan Despotovski - Grafičar Beograd (2021-2022)
- Andrija Dimeski – **Voždovac** (2024–present)
- Milan Dimovski – Topličanin Prokuplje (1993–1994)
- Lazar Djorejlievski – Bežanija (2015–2016)
- **Mario Đurovski** – Bežanija (2003–2008)
- Dušan Filimanovski – Bežanija (2010–2013), Metalac G.M. (2013–2014)
- Jane Gavalovski – Rad Beograd (1998–2004), Mačva Šabac (1997–1998, 2005–2007)
- Georgijevski – Rudar Bor (1989–1993)
- Marko Gjorgjievski – Radnički Pirot (2020–2021)
- Igor Ilić – Jedinstvo Ub (2004–2005)
- **Ismail Ismaili** – ština (199_–199_)
- Filip Jančevski – Hajduk Kula (2014–2017)
- Georgije Jankulov – **Železničar Pančevo** (2020–present)
- Aleksa Jordanov - Trayal Kruševac (2021–2023), **Metalac G.M.** (2023–present)
- Stefan Josifoski – Zemun (2010–2011, 2013–(2014), Inđija (2011–2012)
- **Hristijan Kirovski** – Veternik (2003–(2004), Mačva Šabac (2004–2006)
- **Tome Kitanovski** – Sloboda Užice (2023–2024)
- Vlatko Kolev – Napredak Kruševac (200_–2002), Metalac G.M. (2002–2003)
- **Tihomir Kostadinov** – Moravac Orion (2014–2015)
- Antonio Krstanoski – Moravac Orion (2014–2015)
- Strahinja Krstevski – Proleter Novi Sad (2016–2019), Grafičar Beograd (2019)–2020)
- Petar Krstić – **Radnički Pirot** (2019–present)
- Stevica Kuzmanovski – OFK Beograd (1984–1986, 1990–1991), Rad Beograd (1997–2000)
- Nenad Lazarevski – RFK Novi Sad (2003–2006, 2011–2013), Radnički Sombor (2010–2011), Inđija (2013–2014)
- **Vlade Lazarevski** – Napredak Kruševac (2001–2005), **Temnić Varvarin** (2016–present)
- **Aleksandar Lazevski** – Teleoptik (2004–2007, 2008–2010), **Vršac** (2018–present)
- Daniel Lempevski – Moravac Orion (2014–2015)
- **Borče Manevski** – Banat Zrenjanin (2008–2010)
- Žan Manovski – Srem S.Mitrovica (2011–2012)
- Boban Marić – Hajduk Beograd (2006–2008)
- Zoran Martinovski – GSP Polet Beograd (1997–1998)
- **Dančo Masev** – Rad Beograd (2003–2004)
- Darko Micevski – Sevojno (2009–2010)
- Kjire Mitkov – **Sloboda Užice** (2024–present)
- Mitovski – Sinđelić Beograd (1997–1998)
- Kliment Nastovski – Dinamo Vranje (2006–2007)
- Filip Naumčevski – OFK Mladenovac (2011–2012)
- Pavel Nedelkovski – Radnički Niš (2003–2004)
- Matej Nikolov – **Zlatibor Čajetina** (2020–present)
- Boban Nikolovski – Bor (1995–1996, 2003–2004), Železničar Beograd (1999–2000, 2001–2002), Srem S.Mitrovica (2002–2003), Hajduk Beograd (2003)–2004), Radnički Niš (2004–200_)
- Dragi Pavlov – Radnički Pirot (199_–1998)
- Stefan Petkoski Cimbaljević – **Jedinstvo Ub** (2023–present)
- **Milovan Petrovikj** - **Zlatibor Čajetina** (2021–present)
- Petrovski – Bor (1993–1996)
- Bojan Petrovski – Radnički Niš (2006–2007)
- Borče Postolov – Dinamo Vranje (2006–2007)
- **Predrag Ranđelović** – Teleoptik (2008–2011)
- **Stevica Ristić** – Mladost Luks (2002–2003), **Temnić Varvarin** (2017–present)
- **Dušan Savić** – **Dubočica Leskovac** (2003–2004,2020–present)
- Sazdov – Sloga Kraljevo (1997–1998)
- Marko Simunovikj – Teleoptik (2018–2022), **Radnički Beograd** (2023–present)
- **Stefan Spirovski** – Borac Čačak (2009–2014)
- **Perica Stančeski** – Hajduk Beograd (2003–2004), Mačva Šabac (2016–2017)
- **Ostoja Stjepanović** – Dinamo Vranje (2006–2007)
- Milan Stoilković – **Hajduk Beograd** (2009)–2010, 2011–2012, 2013–present)
- Nikola Stojanov – Sloboda Užice (2016–2017)
- Nikola Stojanović – BSK Bujanovac (2001–2005, 2017–2018), Dinamo Vranje (2005–2013, 2016–2017), Radnik Surdulica (2008)–2009, 2013–2016)
- Filip Stojanovski – Radnički Pirot (2017–2018)
- **Milan Stojanovski** – Proleter Zrenjanin (1993–1997)
- Gjorgji Tanušev – Proleter Novi Sad (2012–2014), Kolubara Lazarevac (2014–2015)
- Zoran Todorov – Zemun (2007–2008), Voždovac (2008–2009)
- **Aleksandar Todorovski** – Radnički Beograd (2002–2005), Grafičar Beograd (2020–2022)
- Milosh Tosheski – Zemun (2018–2020), Smederevo (2018–2020)
- Nikola Tosheski – Proleter Novi Sad (2017–2019)
- Lazar Vidić – Radnički Kragujevac (2009–2011), Mladi Radnik (2011)–2012), Dinamo Vranje (2017)–2018)

Macedonian internationals that played in Serbian second league clubs only during Yugoslav period:

- **Toni Jakimovski** – Radnički Kragujevac (1988–1989)

== Poland ==
- Aleksander Čišič – Bežanija (2014–2015)

== Portugal ==
- Miguel Barbosa – Sloboda Užice (2018–2019)
- Tiago Carneiro – Sevojno (2005–2006)
- Maki Faria - BASK Beograd (2020-2021)
- Vuk Kovacevic – Bežanija (2013–2014)

== Puerto Rico ==
- **Andrés Cabrero** – Teleoptik (2009–2010)

== Romania ==
- Eugen Cîrstea – RFK Novi Sad (1998–1999)
- Jozef Kezdi – Viktorija Vršac (1936–1937)
- Marinel Pascu – Spartak Subotica (____–2001, 2005–2006)
- Paunescu – Grafičar Beograd (1939–1940)
- Florin Pelecaci – Srem S.Mirovica (2006–2007)

== Russia ==
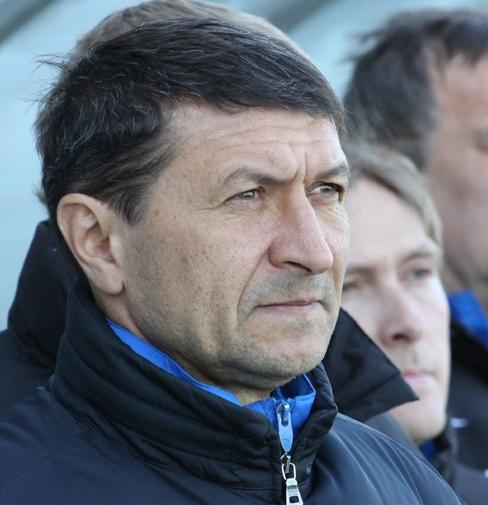
Yuri Gazzaev, back then from Soviet Union, joined Mačva in 1990/91.

- Nikita Arshinov – Bežanija (2017–2018)
- Maksim Artemchuk – Proleter Novi Sad (2017–2018), Zlatibor Čajetina (2019-2020)
- Alexander Azzam – Tekstilac Odžaci (2023–2024)
- Pavel Baranov – **OFK Vršac** (2024–present)
- Stefan Baronov – OFK Žarkovo (2018–2019)
- Leonid Bayer – BASK Beograd (1940–1942)
- Leonid Bobrizhnyiy – KAFK Kula (1934–1936)
- Ignat Deryavko – Bežanija (2017–2018)
- Yuri Gazzaev – Mačva Šabac (1990–1991)
- Stanislav Goldin – Borac Čačak (2020–2021)
- Vladislav Goldin – Tekstilac Odžaci (2023–2024)
- Ilya Guchmazov – Grafičar Beograd (2019-2021)
- Andrei Guzienko – Bečej (1990–1992)
- Juraj Jurak – Radnički Sombor (1945–1946) – ( (Soviet Union) when active)
- Aleksandr Khrebtov – **Zemun** (2024–present)
- Fedor Khudenko – Radnički Beograd (2022–2023)
- Roman Korkhovoy – Sinđelić Beograd (2019–2020)
- Stanislav Krapukhin – Radnički Beograd (2023–2024)
- Uchuk Kuldinov – Proleter Zrenjanin (1946–1949)
- Maksim Lada – Teleoptik (2017–2018). OFK Žarkovo (2021–2022)
- Martvey Martinkevich – Kabel Novi Sad (2021–2022), Loznica (2022–2023)
- Egor Mishura – Sloga Petrovac na Mlavi (2014–2015)
- Sergei Mokoida – Sinđelić Beograd (2017–2018)
- Kiril Pakhomov – OFK Žarkovo (2020–2021)
- Danil Pechenkin – OFK Žarkovo (2019–2020)
- Anton Porutchikov – **Grafičar Beograd** (2023–present)
- Fedor Solovey – Inđija (2023–2024)
- Nikolay Solovjev – **Mladost GAT** (2023–present)
- Nikita Sudarikov – IMT Beograd (2021–2022)
- Igor Sveshnikov – Inđija (2016–2017)
- Daniil Timofeev – IMT Beograd (2021–2022)
- Igor Vasiliev – Ruski SK (1924–1925)
- Rastislav Vasiliev – Ruski SK (1924–1925)
- Vladislav Vasilyev – Bežanija (2017–2018)
- Vladimir Vinogradov – Ruski SK (1924–1925)
- Sergei Vitvinskiy – Građanski Sr. Mitrovica (192_–192_), Vojvodina (1922–1924)
- Bogdan Zhbanov – Sloboda Užice (2017–2018)
- Arkadi Zhelnin - Jedinstvo Ub (2022–2023), **Sloboda Užice** (2023–present)
- Aleksei Zolotarenko – ČSK Pivara (2017–2018)

== Senegal ==
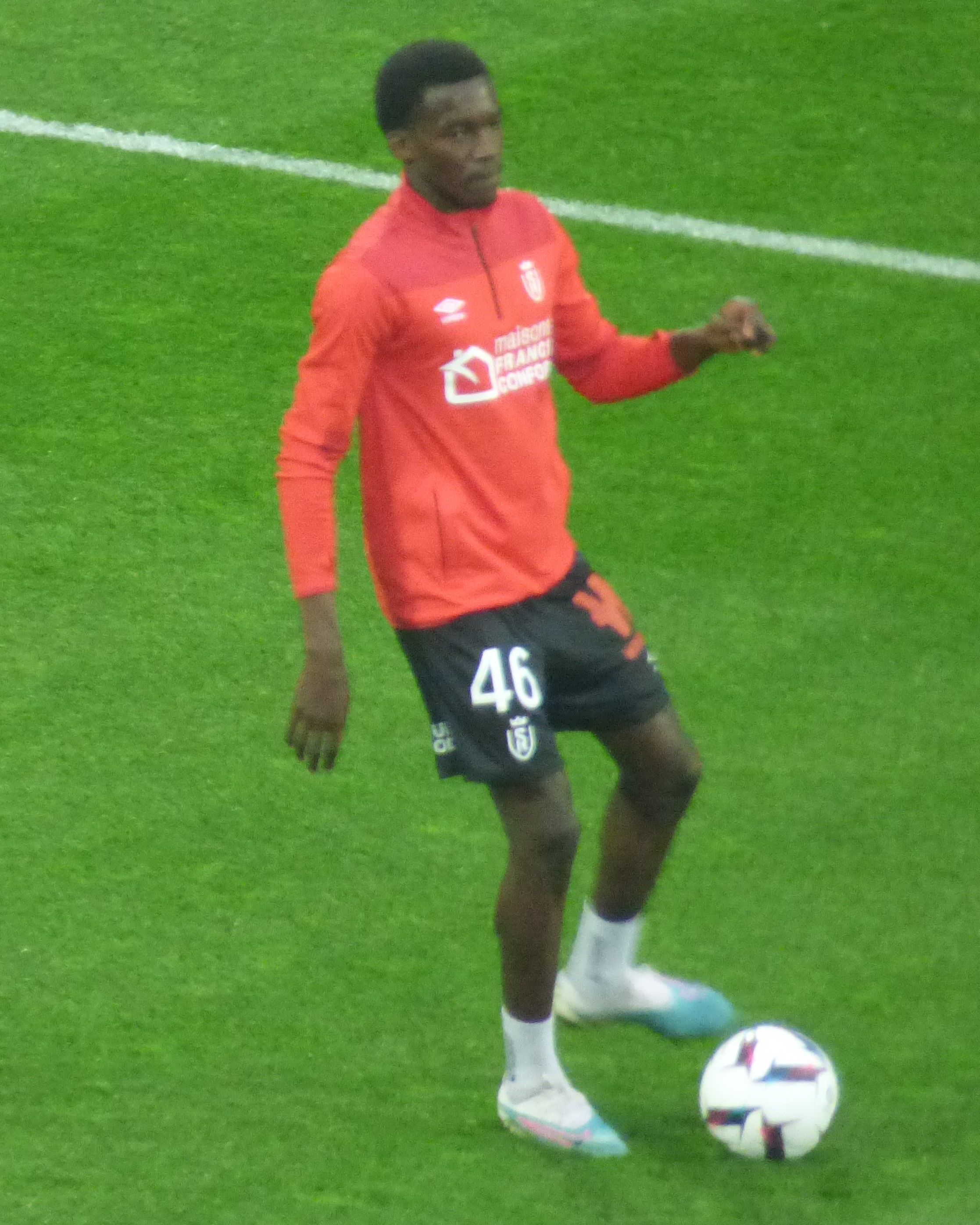
Fallou Fall, Grafičar

- **Bado** (Badara Badji) – Inđija (2018–2019, 2021–2022)
- Mbao Cire – **Grafičar Beograd** (2022–present)
- Alioune Diakhate – Teleoptik (2012–2013)
- Amath Diallo – **Zemun** (2024–present)
- Mamadou Diarra – Bežanija (2009–2010)
- Mamadou Diatta – Javor Ivanjica (2021–2022)
- Cherif Diouf – **Vršac** (2022–present)
- Abdou Diop – Trayal Kruševac (2024–present)
- Fallou Fall – Grafičar Beograd (2022–2023)
- Babacar Mboup – **Grafičar Beograd** (2023–present)
- Ibrahima Mame N'Diaye – Napredak Kruševac (2012–2017)
- Seydou Bocar Seck – Dinamo Vranje (2018–2020)

== Sierra Leone ==
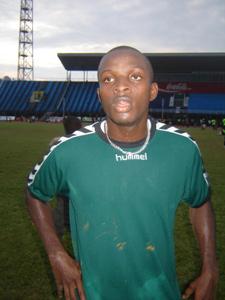
Mustapha Hadji Bangura, after SuperLiga, joined First League side Zemun.

- **Mustapha Bangura** – Zemun (2016–2017)
- **Kelfala Marah** - Čukarički (2003-2005)
- **Alpha Turay** – **Dubočica Leskovac** (2024–present)

== Singapore ==
- **Aleksandar Đurić** – Sloga Kraljevo (1992–1993)
- **Fahrudin Mustafić** – Novi Pazar (2000–2002)

== Slovakia ==
- Boris Durgala – Dolina Padina (2011–2012)
- **Boris Sekulić** – Zemun (2009–2010)
- Marko Turan – Bežanija (2016–2018)

== Slovenia ==
The players that have played for the Slovenian national team are in **bold**, the others have played since 1992.

- Marko Božič – Rad Beograd (2007–2008)
- Dejan Gerić – Radnik Surdulica (2013–2014)
- Goražd Gorinšek – Železničar Lajkovac (2000–2001)
- Josip Lukenda – Javor Ivanjica (2006–2007)
- Vladimir Mandić – Železničar Pančevo (2020–2021)
- Peđa Misimović – Sinđelić Beograd (2013–2014)
- Žan Osredkar – Javor Ivanjica (2006–2007)
- Vanja Panič – Grafičar Beograd (2020)–2021)
- **Milan Rakič** – RFK Novi Sad (1998–2000, 2010–2011)
- **Marko Simeunovič** – Napredak Kruševac (1990–1991)
- Stefan Smiljanić – Jedinstvo Putevi (2014–2015)
- Peter Stojanovič – Bežanija (2012–2013)

== South Africa ==
- Kurt Abrahams – Sloboda Užice (2023–2024)

== South Sudan ==
- **Peter Maker** – Radnički Sremska Mitrovica (2023–2024)

== Suriname ==
- **Mitchell Donald** – Grafičar Beograd (2022–2023)

== Sweden ==
- Robin Kačaniklić – Teleoptik (2011–2012)
- Michell Miljević-Sachpekidis – Radnik Surdulica (2014–2015)

== Switzerland ==
- Milan Basrak – Zemun (2010–2011), Smederevo (2013)–2014, 2019–2020), Inđija (2013–(2014), Jagodina (2020–2021), Budućnost Dobanovci (2021–2022)
- Mihailo Bogicevic – Loznica (2019–2021)
- Nemanja Cvijanović – Dinamo Vranje (2018–2020)
- Milos Gecic – **Smederevo** (2023–present)
- Svetlan Kosić – Loznica (2015–2016), Budućnost Dobanovci (2016–2017)
- Veselin Lakić – Jagodina (2016–2018)
- Srdjan Maksimović – Radnički Pirot (2006–2007), Sevojno (2007–2008)
- Stefan Marinković – Bačka Bačka Palanka (2015–2016)
- Milan Marjanovic – Metalac G.M. (2019–2020)
- Aleksandar Njeguš – Zlatibor Čajetina (2018–2021)
- Emil Osmanovic – Javor Ivanjica (2014–2015)
- Aziz Saihi – **Sloboda Užice** (2024–present)
- Milorad Stajić - Grafičar Beograd (2021–2023)
- Nikola Stevanović – Sloga Kraljevo (2012–2013)
- Miroslav Trajković – Moravac Orion (2014–2015)
- Yves Vladislav – Teleoptik (2016–2018), Sinđelić Beograd (2018–2019)

== Tanzania ==
- **Morice Abraham** – **RFK Novi Sad** (2023–present)
- Leonard Chindongo – Radnički Pirot (2020–2021)
- **Said Khamis** – Jedinstvo Ub (2023–2024)
- Muhsini Malima – Grafičar Beograd (2019–2020)
- Alphonce Msanga – **RFK Novi Sad** (2023–present)
- **Nassor Hamoud** – OFK Žarkovo (2019–2020)

== Thailand ==
- Olaxon A Tamba – Metalac G.M. (2022–2023)

== Tunisia ==
- Aziz Saihi – Javor Ivanjica (2024–2025), **Inđija** (2024–present)

== Uganda ==
- **Khalid Aucho** – OFK Beograd (2016–2017)
- **Timothy Batabaire** – OFK Niš (2003–2005)
- Abdulwahid Iddi – Budućnost Dobanovci (2021–2022)
- **Vincent Kayizi** – Srem S. Mitrovica (2008–2011), Novi Pazar (2010–(2011)
- **Nestroy Kizito** – Srem S. Mitrovica (2003–2005)
- **Abraham Ndugwa** – Budućnost Dobanovci (2021–2022), **Radnički Sremska Mitrovica** (2024–present)
- Pius Obuya – Kabel Novi Sad (2021–2022), **Radnički Sremska Mitrovica** (2022–present)
- **Lawrence Segawa** – Srem S. Mitrovica (2009–2010)
- **Phillip Ssozi** – Srem S. Mitrovica (2003–2005)

== Ukraine ==
- Maksym Andrushchenko – Smederevo (2019–2020), Dubočica Leskovac (2020–2021)
- Taras Bondarenko – Metalac G.M. (2016–2018)
- **Marko Devych** – Zvezdara (2000–2002), Radnički Beograd (2003–2004), Voždovac (2004–2005, 2019–2020)
- Andriy Gordon – Sloboda Užice (2000–2002)
- Serhiy Gordon – Sloboda Užice (2000–2002)
- Yevhen Kovalenko – OFK Žarkovo (2018–2019)
- Pavlo Matviychenko – Novi Pazar (1993–1994)
- Yevhen Pavlov – Vršac (2022–2023), Železničar Pančevo (2023–2024), **Radnik Surdulica** (2024–present)
- Bohdan Sichkaruk – Napredak Kruševac (2015–2016)

== United States ==
- Vukasin Bulatovic – Metalac G.M. (2022–2024), **Dubočica Leskovac** (2024–present)
- **Ilija Mitić** – Bor (1963–1965)
- George Pantelic – Zemun (2010–2013)
- Luciano Sánchez – Mladost GAT (2024–2025)
- Peter Thomas – Bane Raška (2003–2008)
- Nate Weiss – Metalac G.M. (2008–2009)

== Uzbekistan ==
- Abubakir Muydinov – **Trayal Kruševac** (2024–present)
- Nazimov – Jadran Beograd (192x–193x)

== Venezuela ==
- Alejandro Pol Hurtado – Srem S.Mitrovica (2010–2011)

== Zimbabwe ==
- Tinotenda Chibharo – Sloboda Užice (2017–2018)
- Tendai Chitiza – ČSK Pivara (2016–2017), TSC Bačka Topola (2017–2018)
- **Mike Temwanjera** – Javor Ivanjica (2003–2006)

Foreigners in third level

This is a list of foreign players that have played, or play, in the Serbian Leagues; North/Vojvodina, Belgrade, East, West, Serbian Republic League, lower Subassociation Leagues

== Abkhazia ==
- **Daur Chanba** – Lokomotiva Beograd (201x–2018)

== Albania ==
- **Arjan Beqaj** – Liria Prizren (1992–1995)
- Mario Beqaris – FK Beograd (2014–2015)
- Edonis Dacaj – **Radnički Zrenjanin** (2017–present)
- **Armend Dallku** – Kosovo Vučitrn (1997–2002)
- **Mehmet Dragusha** – Beseliđa Priština (199_–1994)
- **Arbnor Fejzullahu** – Trnovac (2010–2011)
- **Besnik Hasi** – Vlaznimi Đakovica (198_–1988), Dinamo Pančevo (1991–1992)
- **Bekim Kastrati** – Budućnost Peć (199_–199_)
- Blerim Krasniqi – Trnovac (200_–20__)
- Riza Lushta – Rudari Trepča (1932–1934)
- **Dodë Tahiri** – ASK Obilić Aranđelovac (1930s&1950s)
- Gjelbrim Taipi – BSK Bujanovac (200_–2010), Trnovac (2010–2011)
- Faton Xhemaili – Budućnost Popovac 2017–2018

== Argentina ==
- Gustavo Marino – Car Konstantin (2006–200_)
- Roberto Oreb – Omladinac Zemun (195_–195_)

== Armenia ==
- Angelyan – Timok Zaječar (1924–1925)
- **Ognjen Čančarević** – Sloga Bajina Baŝta (2007–2008)
- Gari Charatsupyan – Palilulac Beograd (201_–201_)

== Australia ==
- Vid Amidzic – BASK Beograd (2011–2013)
- Stefan Cicmil – IMT Beograd (2016–2017), Žarkovo (2017–2018)
- **Bobby Despotovski** – Dinamo Pančevo (1989–1991)
- Zoran Ilic – FK Jagodina (1993–1995)
- **Milan Ivanović** – FK Crvenka (1978–1979)
- Joey Jevtić – OFK Beograd (2019–2021)
- Aleksandar Jovanovic – FK Palić (2008)–2009), FK Veternik (2008–(2009)
- Jake Jovanovski – **OFK Beograd** (2019–present)
- Angelo Kalamvokis - Radnicki Nova Pazova (2021)-2022), **Hajduk Beška** (2021-(2022)
- Joshua Markovski – IMT Beograd (2016–2019)
- Marko Milutinović – OFK Beograd (2017–2018)
- Srećko Mitrović – Radnički Stobex (2009–2010)
- Srećko Mitrović – Cement Beočin (2017)–2018), Radnički Sremska Mitrovica (2017–(2018)
- David Ninkovic – **Mladost Bački Jarak** (2017–present)
- Damir Prodanovic – Vujić Voda Valjevo (2009–2010)
- Nemanja Sokolović – OFK Beograd (2018–2019), **OFK Mladenovac** (2019–present)
- Stefan Stanojević – Radnički Stobex (2012)–2013), Železničar Lajkovac (2013–(2014), **FK Loznica** (2016–present)
- Milan Zoric – Indeks Novi Sad (2010)–2011), Cement Beočin (2010–(2011)

== Austria ==
- Filip Ćosić – Zemun (2021–3022), Železnik Beograd (2022–2023), **Žarkovo** (2023–present)
- **Goran Kartalija** – Vrbas (1985–1988)
- Ivan Kristo – Hajduk Beograd (200_–200_)
- Stefan Milojević – Bežanija (2017–2019)
- Rastko Rastoka – **Bačka Bačka Palanka** (2023–present)

== Azerbaijan ==
- David Samedov – BASK Beograd (2016–2017)
- **Branimir Subašić** – FK Sremčica (2001–2002)

== Belgium ==
- Akwasi Oduro – Radnički Kragujevac (2008–2009)

== Bosnia and Herzegovina ==
Very incomplete

- Nebojša Arbutina – **Dinamo Pančevo** (2009–2010, 2011–2012, 2012–present), Dolina Padina (2010–2011)
- Omer Arifović – **Loznica** (2017–present)
- Osman Arifović – **Loznica** (2017–present)
- Aleksandar Babić – **Bečej** (2017–present)
- Njegoš Babić – Vršac (2016–2017), **Grafičar Beograd** (2017–present)
- Denil Badzak - **Dinamo Pancevo** (2021–present)
- Miloš Bajić – Radnički Beograd (2016–2017), **IMT Beograd** (2018–2019,2020–present)
- Ognjen Blagojević – PKB Padinska Skela (2012)–2012), Dinamo Pančevo (2012–(2013), Dorćol (2013)–2014), OFK Žarkovo (2013–2017), Železničar Pančevo (2017–2019)
- Slaviša Bogdanović – Palić (2012–2013), Dorćol (2013–2014), Srem Jakovo (2014–2015), **FK Smederevo** (2017–present)
- Marko Bogojević – Radnički Šid (2017–2018)
- Filip Božić – Sloga Požega (2018–2019)
- Milorad Cimirot – Jedinstvo Ub (2010–2012)
- Marko Čubrilo – FK Teleoptik (2016–2018)
- Čedomir Dakić – Sloga Temerin (2008–2010), **Mladost Bački Jarak** (2013–present)
- Nemanja Doderović – Karađorđe Topola (2011–2012, 2013–2017), **Šumadija Aranđelovac** (2012–2013, 2017–present)
- Borislav Erić – **Mačva Bogatić** (2019–present)
- Mladen Galić – FK Sopot (2009–2010), Sloga Temerin (2010–2011), Banat Zrenjanin (2013–2014), OFK Odžaci (2016–2018)
- Ivan Gluhović – Radnički Šid (2016–2017), FK Sopot (2017–2018)
- **Almir Gredić** – Polimlje Prijepolje (1999–2000)
- Goran Guja – FK Vršac (2010–2012)
- Jovan Ilić – Grafičar Beograd (2017–2018), Brodarac (2018–2020)
- Mladen Jezdić – Borac Bivolje (2009–2013), Jedinstvo Paraćin (2013–2014), Dinamo Vranje (2014–2015), **Dunav Prahovo** (2017–present)
- Mladen Jovančić – **Dinamo Pančevo** (2017–present)
- Petar Jovanović – Radnički Stobex (2001–2004), Sloboda Užice (2004–2005)
- Darko Jović – **ČSK Pivara** (2017–present)
- Nemanja Jović – Teleoptik (2019–2020)
- Milorad Kosić – Sloga Temerin (2011)–2012), Mladi Radnik (2012–2013), Cement Beočin (2014–2015), **Mladost Bački Jarak** (2011–(2012), 2013–2014), 2015–present)
- Stefan Kovač – IMT Novi Beograd (2017–2018)
- Milan Lalić – Zemun (2012–2014), Radnički Nova Pazova (2015–2016, 2017–2018)
- Milenko Malović – Srem Jakovo (2011–2012), BASK Beograd (2013–2014)
- Slavko Marić – Hajduk Beograd (2001–2006)
- Dragan-Vuk Marković – Radnički Beograd (2017–2018), **OFK Beograd** (2018–present)
- Dragan Matković - Vršac (2020-2021)
- Slobodan Milanović – FK Beograd (2010–2011)
- Milan Mirić – **Borac Čačak** (2019–present)
- Siniša Mladenović – Sloga Kraljevo (2008–2009, 2010–2014), Metalac Kraljevo (2009–2010)
- Aleksa Mrđa – Lokomotiva Železnik (2018)–2019), **BSK Borča** (2019–present)
- Momčilo Mrkaić – FK Zemun (2011–2013, 2018–2019)
- Branko Ostojić – Sloboda Čačak (2002–2007), Radnički Kragujevac (2007–2008, 2018–2019), FAP Priboj (2008–2010), Partizan Bumbarevo Brdo (2010–2011), **Borac Čačak** (2019–present)
- Danijel Panić – RFK Novi Sad (2013)–2014), Sloga Temerin (2013–2017), **Mladost Bački Jarak** (2017–present)
- Đorđe Pantelić – **Kabel Novi Sad** (2018–present)
- Stefan Paranos – Crvena zvezda Mali Mokri Lug (2016–2017), BSK Batajnica (2017)–2018), **BASK Beograd** (2017–present)
- Milovan Petrić – OFK Vršac (2018)–2019)
- Todor Petrović – FK Zemun (2011–2012), FK Sopot (2012–2014)
- Bojan Popović – Srem Jakovo (2010–2011), FK Beograd (2011–2012)
- Kristijan Radinovic - OFK Beograd (2020-2022)
- Branislav Ružić – **Loznica** (2011–2012, 2019–present)
- Stefan Santrač – **Grafičar Beograd** (2018–present)
- Željko Savić – **Omladinac Novi Banovci** (2006–2012, 2019–present)
- Filip Sredojević – FK Smederevo (2015–2016), **Grafičar Beograd** (2016–present)
- Đorđe Stanković – **Sinđelić Niš** (2019–present)
- Nemanja Stjepanović – Big Bull Bačinci (2004–2005)
- Ognjen Stjepanović – Brodarac (2016–2017)
- Ognjen Šinik – Radnik Stari Tamiš (2004–2008), Sinđelić Beograd (2008–2009), FK Beograd (2009–2010), Dolina Padina (2014)–2015), Radnički Sombor (2014–(2015), **OFK Beograd** (2017–present)
- Branislav Terzić – BASK Beograd (2011–2012), **FK Zemun** (2012–2013, 2018–present)
- Zoran Vasiljević – Radnički Sombor (199_–199_), Cement Beočin (199_–____)
- Nemanja Vejnović – Jedinstvo Ub (2010–2012)
- Predrag Vladić – **Kabel Novi Sad** (2018–present)
- Filip Vujović – **FK Žarkovo** (2016–present)
- Stefan Vukadin – OFK Žarkovo (2013–2014), IM Rakovica (2014–2015), FK Teleoptik (2015–2017)
- Goran Vukliš – Radniĉki Nova Pazova (2006–2007), FK Zemun (2008–2009)
- Dejan Vukomanović – Palilulac Beograd (2006–2011), BSK Borča (2011–2012, 2019–2020)

== Botswana ==
- Jovan Nikolić – Zemun (2021–2022)

== Brazil ==
- Adriano – Zmaj Zemun (2007–2008)
- Alex – FK Teleoptik (2008–2010)
- Edison Amaral – Remont Čačak (2000–2001)
- Anderson Costa – Dinamo Pančevo (2002–2004)
- Elton Martins – FK Teleoptik (2008–2009)
- Fabio Silva - **Hajduk Beograd** (2020–present)
- Jefferson Madeira – FK Teleoptik (2008–2009)
- Moisés – Sinđelić Niš (2008–2009)
- Renan Eduardo – Sinđelić Niš (2008–2009)
- Wagner – Zmaj Zemun (2007–2008)
- Washington Santana – FK Teleoptik (2008–2010)
- William Alves – Slavija Novi Sad (2008–2009)

== Brunei ==
- Arsen Marjan – PKB Padinska Skela (199_–1998), Palilulac Beograd (2010–2011)

== Bulgaria ==
- Georgi Bogdanov – Morava Ćuprija (1990–1991)
- **Ivan Čvorović** – FK Teleoptik (2002–2003), Srem Jakovo (2003–2005)
- Tsvetko Ivanov – FK Jagodina (1990–1991)
- Veljko Jelenković – Bečej (2021)–2022)
- Karakashanov – Ozren Sokobanja (1963–1964)
- Hari Kazakov – Timok Zaječar (199_–199_)
- Yordan Kostov – Timok Zaječar (1990–1991)
- Bev Lulin – Radnički Svilajnac (1990–1991)
- Kiril Petrov – Radnički Svilajnac (1990–1991)
- Dimitar Petrunov – Jedinstvo Platičevo (2003–2008), Jedinstvo Pirot (201_–2015)
- Sokolov – FK Bor (1987–1989, 1997–2000)
- **Metodi Tomanov** – Timok Zaječar (1990–1991)
- **Zlatomir Zagorčić** – Grafičar Beograd (2006–2009)
- Nikolay Zoykov – Morava Ćuprija (1990–1991)

== Burkina Faso ==
- **Issouf Compaoré** – Fruškogorac (2008–2009)

== Cameroon ==
- Theophile Abanda - Loznica (2006-2007), Vujić Voda Valjevo (2007-2008), Jedinstvo Ub (2008–2009)
- Thierry Ako – Spartak Subotica (2003–2005, 2007–2008), Bečej (2005–2007)
- Vincent Ngongang – BSK Batajnica (2001–2004), Teleoptik (2004–2006), Proleter Novi Sad (2006–2009), Metalac Futog (2009–2012), Borac Kruševac (2012–2014), Crvenka (2014–2017)
- Claude Rygan – Teleoptik (2003–2004)

== Canada ==
- Milan Beader – Omladinac Novi Banovci (2016–2017)
- Nikola Borjan – Zvezdara (2023–2024)
- Milan Božić – Železničar Beograd (2007)–2008), Kolubara Lazarevac (2007–(2008), FK Beograd (2009–2010), FK Bulbuderac (2012–2013), FK Zvezdara (2013–2015)
- Srdjan Djekanović – Zmaj Zemun (2001–2002), Železničar Beograd (2003–2004)
- **Tibor Gemeri** – FK Crvenka (1974–1975)
- Milan Janikic – Lokomotiva Beograd (2008–2012)
- Boban Kajgo – Hajduk Beograd (2007–2009, 2009–2011), Balkan Bukovica (2012–2013)
- Misel Klisara – Spektrum Novi Sad (2006)–2007)
- Olivier Lacoste-Lebuis – Mladi Radnik Bačina (2000–2002)
- Jovan Lučić – Hajduk Beograd (2014–2015), BSK Batajnica (2015)–2016), FK Vršac (2015–(2016), Radnički Beograd (2016–2018). FK Zvezdara (2018–2019)
- Aleksa Marković – Radnički Beograd (2016)–2017), FK Brodarac (2016–(2017)
- Igor Prostran – FK Beograd (200x–2001)
- **Mike Stojanovic** – Morava Velika Plana (1966–1969)

== China ==
- Gao Feng – FK Beograd (2006–2007)
- Li Xin – Zvižd Kučevo (2007–2008)
- **Wan Houliang** – ČSK Pivara (2002–2004)
- **Xu Yang** – FK Beograd (2006–2007)
- Zeyi Feng - Kabel Novi Sad (2020-2021)
- Zhao Pu – Zvižd Kučevo (2007–2008)

== Côte d'Ivoire ==
- Rudolph Diezion – FK Gučevo (2007–2009)
- Arnaud Gaibo – FK Gučevo (2008–2009)
- Marcel Metoua – FK Fruškogorac (2007–2008)
- Simlice Ouhomblegnon – FK Gučevo (2008–2009)

== Croatia ==
The players that have played for the Croatia National Team are in **bold**, the others have played since 1992.

- Predrag Alić – **Budućnost Gložan** (2014–present)
- Vedran Bjelajac – Proleter Zrenjanin (2003–2006), Begej Žitište (2006–2007), Crvena zvezda Vojvode Stepe (2007–2008), Spartak Debeljača (2008)–2009), Metalac Futog (2008–2010), KMF SAS Zrenjanin (2010–2011), FK Veternik (2011–2012), **Cement Beočin** (2012–present)
- Dean Borović – Radnički Beograd (2007–2008), Balkan Bukovica (2008–2012)
- Matteo Brdar – Dunav Stari Banovci (2013–2014), Jedinstvo Stara Pazova (2015)–2016), **Sremac Vojka** (2015–present)
- Ivan Budinčević – Obilić Novi Kneževac (1991–199_), Radnički Bajmok (199_–199_), Zorka Subotica (199_–199_), FK Aleksa Šantić (199_–2000)
- Dražen Cvjetković – Tekstilac Odžaci (1998–1999), FK Crvenka (1999–2000, 2006–2007, 20__–2014), FK Inđija (2000–2001), Spartak Subotica (2001–2007), FK Vršac, FK Bajmok
- Armando Čekić – Sloboda Novi Kozarci (2009–201_), FK Palić (201_–2014), OFK Kikinda (2014–2015), **ŽAK Kikinda** (2015–present)
- Dejan Čugalj – FK Srbobran (2014–2016)
- Zoran Čugalj – Radnički Šid (2001–2002)
- Dragan Dobrić – BSK Borča (2004–2005), Palilulac Beograd (2005–2010), Srem Jakovo (2010–2011), FK Resnik (2011–2012), **PKB Padinska Skela** (2012–present)
- Dražen Dobrić – Šumadinac Stojnik (2007–2009), Posavac Tišma (2009–2010), Borac Progar (2010–2011), **Srem Jakovo** (2011–present)
- Branislav Drobnjak – Borac Martinci (2004–2006), FK Big Bul (2009–2010), **Radnički Šid** (2010–2011, 2012–present)
- Stevica Dujaković – BSK Borča (2004–2005)
- Duško Dukić – **Jedinstvo Paraćin** (2004–2006, 2019–present), Borac Paraćin (2018–2019)
- **Svetozar Džanić** – Slavija Novi Sad (193x–1934)
- Dejan Godar – FK Tavankut (199_–199_), Solunac Karađorđevo (199_–199_)
- Boris Gospojević – Borac Novi Sad (2007–2008), **Radnički Šid** (2008–2011, 2011–present), Proleter Novi Sad (2010–(2011)
- Nebojša Ivančević – Radnički Nova Pazova (2014–2016)
- Goran Ivanišević – Omladinac Novi Banovci (2009–2011), **Dunav Stari Banovci** (2011–present)
- Ognjen Ivić – Radnički Sremska Mitrovica (2011–2012)
- Radovan Ivković – Krila Krajina Bačka Palanka (2006–2007), OFK Futog (2007–2008), Bačka Bačka Palanka (2008–2010, 2012–present), **ČSK Pivara** (2010–2011, 2018–present), Hajduk Kula (2018)–2019)
- Srđan Ivković – **Radnički Šid** (2012–2014, 2014–present)
- Nemanja Jorgić – Sloga Temerin (2006–2008, 2011–2014), FK Palić (2008–2010), Radnički Sombor (2013–2014), Cement Beočin (2014)–2015), **TSC Bačka Topola** (2014–present)
- Slaven Juriša – Dinamo Pančevo (2012–2016)
- Ilija Knezić – FK Big Bull (2007–2010), FK Resnik (2009)–2010), **FK Žarkovo** (2011–present)
- Ivan Konjević – FK Teleoptik (199_–199_)
- Dario Krivokuća – **Jedinstvo Stara Pazova** (2015–present)
- Petar Krneta – Radnički Šid (2011–2012)
- Zoran Kukić – Radnički Šid (1999–2000)
- Slaven Lakić – **Radnički Sombor** (2001–2006, 2009–present)
- Denis Lazinica – FK Palić (2009–2011), Radnički Bajmok (2011–2012), FK Bačka 1901 (2012–2015)
- Marko Lepinjica – **Radnički Šid** (2013–present)
- Boženko Lešina – Zmaj Zemun (2005–2008)
- Davor Magoč – Šajkaš Kovilj (2004)–2005), ČSK Pivara (2004–2008, 2009–2010), Stražilovo Sr. Karlovci (2010–2011), Crvena zvezda Novi Sad (2011–2012)
- Slavko Mandić – FK Bačka 1901 (199_–199_)
- Aleksandar Manojlović – **Jedinstvo Stara Pazova** (2011–present)
- Dušan Martić – Tekstilac Odžaci (2011–2013)
- Jovica Mikić – Zmaj Zemun (2007–2009), Fruškogorac Kukujevci (2012–2014), **Radnički Šid** (2014–present)
- Boris Miljković – **FK Car Konstantin** (2010–present)
- Bojan Milovanović – RFK Novi Sad (20__–20__)
- Todor Mizdrak – Mladi Obilić (2003–2005), Železničar Beograd (2005–2006, 2008–2010), Balkan Bukovica (2009–(2010), FK Žarkovo (2012–2013), **FK Brodarac** (2014–present)
- Marko Moravčić – FK Bačka 1901 (2003–2004), Zlatibor Voda Horgoš (2006–2007), Spartak Subotica (2007–2008)
- Miroslav Pavlović – **ČSK Pivara** (2001–2004, 2004–2011, 2013–present), Budućnost Gložan (2012–2013)
- Predrag Počuča – FK Dorćol (2004)–2005), FK Žarkovo (2004–(2005)
- Dejan Poljaković – FK Bačka 1901 (1993–199_)
- Mario Pufek – Spartak Subotica (200_–2004), FK Bačka 1901 (2014–2015)
- Tomislav Pukšec – Topličanin Prokuplje
- Ognjen Pupovac – FK Obilić (201_–2015)
- Uroš Puskas – **Radnički Šid** (2015–present)
- Obrad Ratković – FK Vršac (2008–2014)
- Nikola Rudnicki – Banat Zrenjanin (2009–2010, (2013)–2014), Vojvodina Novo Miloševo (2010)–2011), Zadrugar Lazarevo (2011–2012), Budućnost Srpska Crnja (2012–2013), Jedinstvo Novi Bečej (2013–(2014), Jedinstvo Banatsko Karađorđevo (2014–2015), **Begej Žitište** (2015–present)
- **Kujtim Shala** – Liria Prizren (1981–1983)
- Aleksandar Špehar – **Bratstvo Prigrevica** (2015–present)
- Zoran Stamenić – ČSK Pivara (1998–2004, 2004–2006)
- Nemanja Tomić – **Mladi Radnik** (2012–present)
- Dragan Trešnjić – Spartak Subotica (2003–2005)
- Damir Vitas – Radnički Bajmok (2002–2003)
- Mile Vujasin – Cement Beočin (2012–2013), Dunav Stari Banovci (2013)–2014), Radnički Nova Pazova (2013–(2014), 2014–2016), Ozren Sokobanja (2014)–2015)

== Cyprus ==
- Alexander Špoljarić – Hajduk Beograd (2016–2017), Grafičar Beograd (2017–2018)

== Czech Republic ==
- Jozef Boucek aka Josip Buček – Deligrad Aleksinac (1909)
- Richard Jakubec – Palilulac Beograd (197_–19__)
- Janiček – ĐSK Inđija (193_–1941)
- Alois Machek – FK Šumadija 1903 (191_–191_), Morava Ćuprija (1918), Soko Beograd (1927–192_)
- Eduard Mifek – FK Šumadija 1903 (191_–191_), Morava Ćuprija (1918)
- Venčel Petrovický – FK Šumadija 1903 (191_–191_)
- Jozef Urlah – Mladost Bački Petrovac (1990–1991)
- Juraj Varga – Mladost Bački Petrovac (1990–1991)
- Rudolf Vitner – Bačka Bačka Palanka (194_–195_)
- Batko Voves – Srbobran

== Denmark ==
- Michael Hansen Schon – Bačka Bačka Palanka (2009–2010)
- Dimitrije Vasiljevic – Ozren Sokobanja (2020–2021)

== Dominican Republic ==
- **Eduardo Acevedo** – Crvenka (2008–2009), Veternik (2009–2010)
- **Kerbi Rodríguez** – Crvenka (2008–2009), Veternik (2009–2010)

== Egypt ==
- Karim Marei – Obiliċ (2009–2010)

== El Salvador ==
- **Vladan Vicevic** – Sloboda Užice (1986–1992, 1999–2002)

== England ==
- Nicholas Tonic – **Car Konstantin** (2013–present)

== France ==
- Comisser – FK Bor (1920–19__)
- Galoa – FK Bor (1920–19__)
- Gisse – FK Bor (1920–19__)
- Jean – BSK Vitez Bor (1924–1925)
- Goran Jerković – Prva Iskra Barić (2021–2022)
- Marcel – BSK Vitez Bor (1924–1925)
- David Marinković – Banat Zrenjanin (2012–2015), Radnički Zrenjanin (2016–2020)
- David Milinković – BASK Beograd (2012–2015)
- Stephen Milosavljević – Bane Raška (2011–2012)
- Morran – FK Bor (1920–19__)
- Prinne – FK Bor (1920–19__)
- Talle – FK Bor (1920–19__)

== Georgia ==
- Akaki Tskarozia – Sinđelić Beograd (2007–2008)

== Germany ==
- Andrej Bencke – Kabel Novi Sad (2022)–2023), **Zemun** (2022–present)
- Milan Delevic – Zvezdara (2018–2020)
- Aleksandar Dugonjić – Cement Beočin (2015–2016), **Sloga Temerin** (2016–present)
- Aleksandar Erak – Sloga Temerin (2013–2016), Bratstvo Prigrevica (2016)–2017, 2019–present), TSC Bačka Topola (2016–2019), Hajduk Kula (2019)–2020), **RFK Novi Sad** (2021-present)
- Zarije Gojkovic – **Mladost Bački Jarak** (2017–present)
- Stefan Jovanović – Zemun (2012–2013), Radnički Obrenovac (2013–2014), Srem Jakovo (2014–2016), FK Dorćol (2016–2017), **OFK Beograd** (2017–present)
- Viktor Jung – Viktorija Vršac (1924–1925)
- Arsenije Klisurić – Kolubara Lazarevac, Teleoptik, Sloga Kraljevo (2006–2008)
- Stefan Kukoljac – Crvena zvezda Mali Mokri Lug (2015–2016, 2018–2019), BASK Beograd (2017–2018), **OFK Beograd** (2019–present)
- Uroš Milovanović – **OFK Beograd** (2016–present)
- Robert Puha – Bačka Subotica (1990–1991)
- Srđan Stevanović – Grafičar Beograd (2005–2006)
- Nikola Vukasinovic – OFK Kula (2012–2014), Ozren Sokobanja (2014–2015), **Hajduk Kula** (2015–present)

== Ghana ==
- Melvin Banda – OFK Šapine (2015–2016)

== Greece ==
- Theodoros Apostolidis – Mladost Bor (1970)–1971)
- Artas Charaiskakis - **OFK Beograd** (2022–present)
- Janko Jovanovic – **Šumadija Kragujevac** (2017–present)
- Christoforos Margaritis – Indeks Novi Sad (2006–2008), FK Dorćol (2008–2009)
- Marko Stojanov – Železničar Pančevo (201_–2018), **Dinamo Pančevo** (2018–present)
- Dimitris Tsinovits – IMT Beograd (2018–2020)
- Michalis Zistakis – Konkordija Beograd (19__–1924), Trgovački Beograd (1929–1930)

== Guinea ==
- Fodé Cisse – Sinđelić Niš (2004–2006), FK Dorćol (2006–2007), Sinđelić Beograd (2007–2008)

== Honduras ==
- Manuel Ancheta – TSC Bačka Topola (2011–2012)

== Hungary ==
- Gyula Blau – UTK Novi Sad (19__–1913)
- Tamás Boros – TSC Bačka Topola (2013–2016)
- **Predrag Bošnjak** – FK Bačka 1901 (2002–2004), FK Veternik (2004–2006), OFK Kikinda (2008–2009)
- Toni Buják – Radnički Sombor (20__–2013), Partizan Kupusina (2013–(2014)
- Hampar Cumjan Garabet – Grafičar Beograd (2007–2008)
- Ivan Glavnik – Metalac Bor (1944–1945), FK Bor (1945–1946)
- Jószef Hornok – Bačka Subotica (1945–1949)
- Lajos Horváth – Građanski Sr. Mitrovica (1919–1920s)
- István Juhász – FK Bačka 1901
- **Jenő Kalmár** – Eđšeg Bačka Topola (1946–1948)
- **Zsombor Kerekes** – AFK Ada (198_–1990)
- János Keresztes – Bunjevac Subotica (193_–1938), Bohemija Subotica (1938–19xx)
- **Norbert Könyves** – FK Bačka Topola (2007–2008)
- József Kőszegi – FK Bačka Mol (1920s)
- Sándor Kőszegi – FK Bačka Mol (1920s)
- László Köteles – Grafičar Beograd (2003–2005)
- Sándor Kovács – FK Senta (199_–199_)
- Károly Kovacsics – Zlatibor Voda Horgoš (2007–2008)
- József Lakatos – Jugoslavija Jabuka (1937–1938), Radnički Kragujevac (1945–1946)
- Robert Mak – Spartak Debeljača (2007–2011, 2013–2015), Dolina Padina (2011–2012)
- Ferenc Makó – Bulbuderac (1952–195_)
- Tamás Mező – OFK Niš (1997–1998)
- Sándor Mihalecz – FK Senta (2009–2010)
- Ádám Nagypál - **AFK Ada** (2021–present)
- László Némedi – FK Bor (1959–1963)
- Károly Nemes – NAK Novi Sad (1919–1924)
- **Nemanja Nikolić** – FK Senta (200_–2006)
- **István Nyers** – ŽAK Subotica (1941–1945)
- György Oláh – FK Bačka Mol (192_–1931, 1943–1947, 1950–195_), FK Senta (1934–1937), Jugoslavija Jabuka (1937–19__) – played for Hungary B
- Lajos Pál – FK Omladinac Bor (1937–19__)
- Zsolt Radics – FK Horgoš (199_–199_), Graničar Jamena (____–2001), FK Senta (2005–2006)
- László Rozgonyi – Radnički Pirot (2007–2008), Dinamo Pančevo (200_–200_)
- Tibor Szabó – FK Teleoptik (199_–199_), Cement Beočin (1996–1997)
- Toni Szabó – PSK Pančevo (1924–192_)
- Tojaš – UTK Novi Sad (1920)
- József Urda – FK Bačka Mol (1940s)
- Stefan Vladul – Dinamo Pančevo (20__–20__), Dolina Padina (2011–2012)
- István Vörös – RFK Novi Sad (1961–1962)

== Iceland ==
- Zlatko Krickic – Polet Ljubić (2013–2014)
- Đorđe Panić – Grafičar Beograd (2017–2018)

== Iran ==
- Darie Keramat - **AFK Ada** (2022–present)

== Italy ==
- Stefano Andreata – Inđija (2012–2015), Jedinstvo Stara Pazova (2015–2018)
- Arnoldo Balduini – Metalac Bor (1955–1961)
- Mirko Benin – Inđija (2007–2008)
- Augusto Della Pietra – Jedinstvo Zaječar (193_–1937), Građanski Ćuprija (1937–193_)
- Franceschi – Sloga Kraljevo (1961–1962)
- Lino Gazapi – Sloboda Užice (1947)
- Stefano Guidici – Bačka Subotica (1945–1947)
- Lorenzo Luciano – Kabel Novi Sad (2017–2018), **Homoljac Žagubica** (2020–present)
- Mario – Maksim Divnić Zemun (1945)
- Stefano Pignatelli – Palilulac Beograd, (196_–196_), FK Jugopetrol (196_–1967), Čukarički (1967–1969)

== Japan ==
- Masafumi Takatsuka – IMT Beograd ()

== Kazakhstan ==
- **Nenad Erić** – Sloga Požega (1999–2002)

== Korea D.P.R. ==
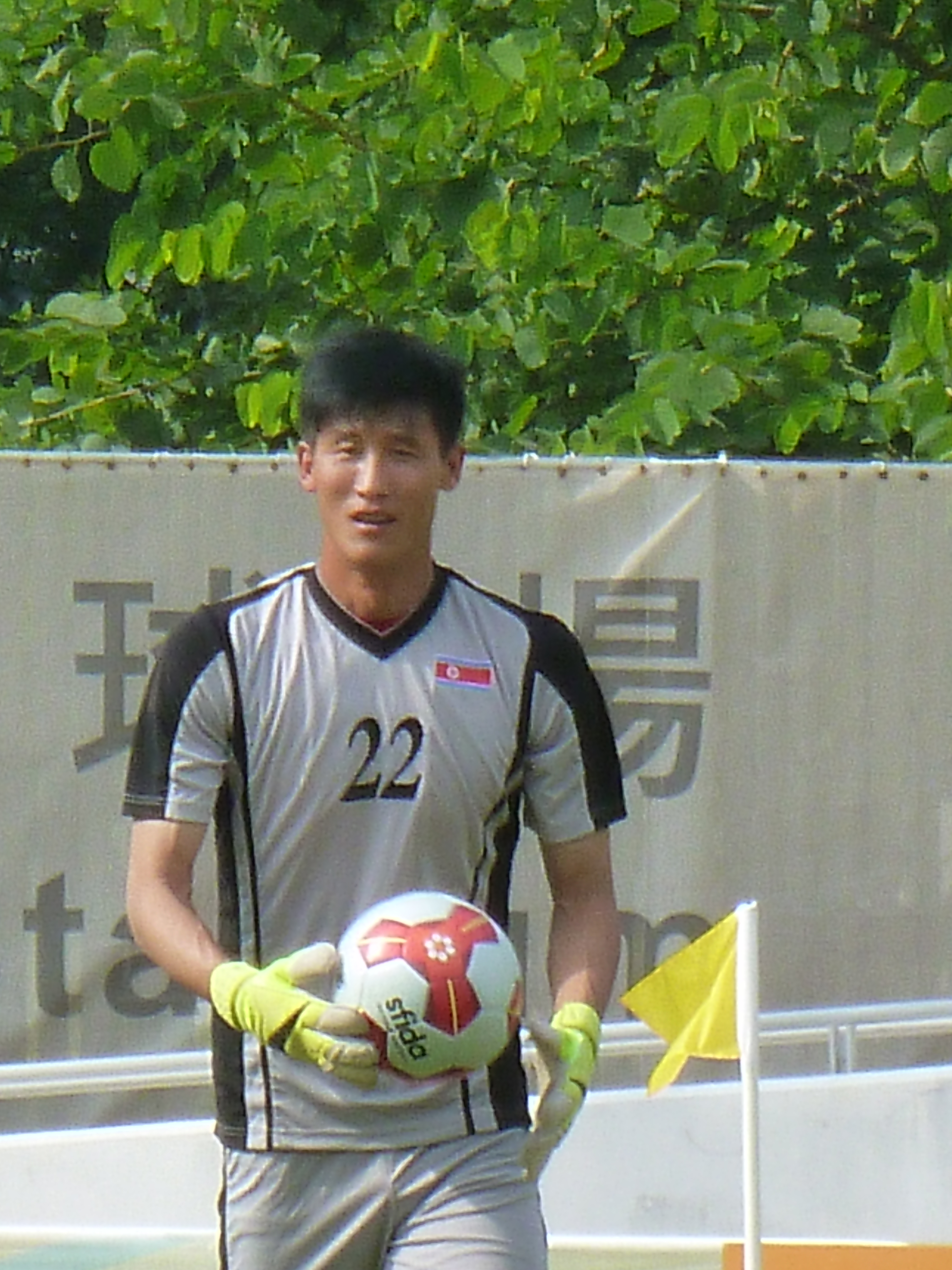
Ri Kwang-il, North Korean international goalkeeper played with Radnički Kragujevac.

- **An Il-bom** – Radnički Kragujevac (2009–2010)
- **Myong Cha-hyon** – Radnički Kragujevac (2009–2010)
- **Ri Kwang-il** – Radnički Kragujevac (2009)–2010), Erdoglija Kragujevac (2009–(2010)

== Korea (South) ==
- Jeo Won-dang – Teleoptik (2004–2005)
- Lin Chan-jang - Radnički Nova Pazova (201x-2017)
- Uh Jun-yong - Mladost Apatin (2010-2011)

== Kosovo ==
- Safet Abazaj – Jedinstvo Novi Bečej (1989–1993)
- Edin Ahmeti – Prva Petoletka Trstenik (200_–2006), **Palilulac Beograd** (2006–present)
- Filip Berisha – **Zvezdara** (2016–2018, 2019–present), BSK Borča (2018)–2019)
- Ernes Dalifi – Hajduk Beograd (2012–2014), **BASK Beograd** (2014–present), Radnički Beograd (2015–(2016)
- Eldin Djemaj – Dunav Stari Banovci (2013–2015)
- Bujamim Dzemaili – Dinamo Vranje (2014–2015)
- Muhamed Ilazi – Sloga Leskovac (2006–2008), **Moravac Predejane** (2012–present)
- Besnik Krasniqi – Trnovac (2014–2015)
- **Lapidar Lladrovci** – 14. Oktobar (2011–2013)
- Enes Maliqi – Borac Ostružnica (201_–2014)
- Husein Nazifi – Jastrebac Proleter (2006–2008)
- Stefan Shala – Sloga Despotovac (2016)–2017), **Borac Paraćin** (2016–present)
- Nexhat Sulejmani – Železničar Beograd (1998–1999)
- **Gjelbrim Taipi** – Trnovac (2010–2011)
- **Jetmir Topalli** – Trnovac (2015–2017)
- Arton Zekaj – Sopot (2017–2018), Tisa Adorjan (2022–2023)
- Iljasa Zulfiu – Pukovac (2016–2017), Ozren Sokobanja (2017–2018)

== Liberia ==
+ **Omega Roberts** – **BSK Baćevac** (2023–present)

== Libya ==
- Majid Mahdi – Donji Srem (2015–2017)

== Lithuania ==
- Peter Jesaulenko – Ruski SK (1924–192x)

== Malta ==
- Neil Frendo – OFK Beograd (2018–2019)
- Zachary Grech – OFK Beograd (2018–2019)
- **Mattia Veselji** – OFK Beograd (2018–2019,2020–2021)

== Moldova ==
- Aleksandr Frangu – **Železnik** (201_–present)
- Dmitrie Moşneagă – Sloga Petrovac na Mlavi (2006–2010)
- Igor Tiunikov – Železničar Niš (2007–20xx)

== Montenegro ==
- Bojan Adžić - Brodarac (2021)-2022)
- Radovan Banjević – Crvena zvezda Novi Sad (2018–2019), **Bačka Subotica** (2019–present)
- Darko Bošković – **OFK Odžaci** (2017–present)
- **Vladimir Božović** – **Šumadija Kragujevac** (2016–present)
- Marko Brnović - Teleoptik (2021–2022)
- Drago Bumbar – Grafičar Beograd (2016–2018)
- Pavle Čujović – IMT Novi Beograd (2018)–2019), **Stepojevac Vaga** (2018–present)
- Stefan Dabetić – Šumadija Jagnjilo (2009–2011), FK Voždovac (2011–2013), IM Rakovica (2013)–2014), FK Sopot (2013–2014, 2015–2017), Radnički Beograd (2015)–2016), **FK Dorćol** (2016)–2017, 2017–present)
- Marko Despotović – Jedinstvo Ub (2012–2015), Radnički Obrenovac (2014–(2015), Omladinac Novi Banovci (2015–2016), Dunav Stari Banovci (2016–2018)
- Mirko Drašković – **BASK Beograd** (2017–present)
- Jovan Drobnjak – FK Beograd (2010–2011)
- Lazar Đokić – Radnički Beograd (2015–(2016)
- Vuk Đurić – Sloboda Užice (2005–2007, (2011)–2012, 2015–2016), FK Voždovac (2011–2013), Sinđelić Beograd (2012–(2013), Sloga Bajina Bašta (2016–2017)
- Nikola Glavičanin – Pobeda Beloševac (2012–2014), OFK Mladenovac (2013–(2014), Zvezdara (2014–2016), Vršac (2016–2017), Crvena zvezda Novi Sad (2017–2019), **Hajduk Kula** (2019–present)
- Tigran Goranović – Grafičar Beograd (2016–2017), Radnički Beograd (2017–2018), IMT Novi Beograd (2018–2010)
- Boško Guzina – FK Žarkovo (2015–2017)
- Milovan Ilić – Radnički Pirot (2018–2019), **Topličanin Prokuplje** (2019–present)
- Stefan Knežević – Brodarac Beograd (2018–2019), **Radnički Obrenovac** (2019–present)
- Veselin Kosović – Železničar Pančevo (2016–2017), **Proleter Vranovo** (2017–present)
- Nikola Krstinić – Banat Zrenjanin (2009–2011, 2013–2016), Zadrugar Lazarevo (2011–2012), Dolina Padina (2015–(2016), **Radnički Zrenjanin** (2016–present)
- Krsto Ljubanović – **Teleoptik** (2022–present)
- Stefan Mihajlović – Crvena zvezda Novi Sad (2016–2017), Mladost Bački Jarak (2017–2018)
- **Nemanja Mijušković** – Jedinstvo Ub (2009–2010)
- Petar Milivojević – **Radnički Obrenovac** (2016–present)
- Danilo Mugoša – Teleoptik (2020–2022), Tutin (2023–2024)
- Sava Mugoša – FK Vršac (2016)–2017), BSK Batajnica (2016–(2017), Dinamo Pančevo (2017)–2018), **FK Tutin** (2017–present)
- Nedžad Nezirović – **FK Tutin** (2017–present)
- Baćo Nikolić – Drina Ljubovija (2018–2019), **Timočanin Knjaževac** (2019–present)
- Nemanja Ostojić – FK Palić (2013–2014), FK Teleoptik (2014–2015), Hajduk Beograd (2015–2016)
- Vasilije Perović – **Ozren Sokobanja** (2017–present)
- Andrej Pupović – **Železničar Pančevo** (2019–present)
- Stefan Račković – Zvižd Kučevo (2015)–2016), BASK Beograd (2016)–2017), Stepojevac Vaga (2017)–2018), **Proleter Vranovo** (2017–present)
- Vasilije Radenović – Kolubara Lazarevac (2013–2016), Brodarac Beograd (2019)–2020)
- Aleksandar Radović – Kolubara Lazarevac (2003–2004, 2006–2007), FK Bečej (2005)–2006, (2006)–2007), FK Sopot (2005–2006), Hajduk Beograd (2007–2008), Borac Sakule (2015–2016)
- **Marko Rakonjac** – IMT Beograd (2019–2020)
- Peđa Savić – **Teleoptik** (2015–present)
- Marko Stanovčić – Sinđelić Beograd (2008–2009), FK Zemun (2012–2013), FK Sopot (2016–2017), **GSP Polet Dorćol** (2017–present)
- **Nikola Šipčić** – OFK Žarkovo (2014–2016)
- Bojan Šljivančanin – Teleoptik (2006–2008)
- Filip Vorotović – **Teleoptik** (2016–2017, 2018–present)
- Aleksandar Vujačić – FK Zemun (2008–2009)
- **Nikola Vujnović** – Radnički Obrenovac (2012–2014)
- Predrag Vujović – Trayal Kruševac (2016–2018), **Jedinstvo Paraćin** (2018–present)
- **Nikola Vukčević** – **Lokomotiva Beograd** (2017–present)
- Novak Vuković – Sloga Kraljevo (2020)–2021), Dubočica Leskovac (2020–(2021)

== Netherlands ==
- Suleiman Jalu - OFK Beograd (2019-2020)
- Aleksandar Janković – Radnički Kragujevac (2020–2021)

== Nigeria ==
- Victor Agbo – Grafičar Beograd (2004–2005), Sloga Kraljevo (2007–2008), Šumadija Aranđelovac (2008–2009), Rudar Kostolac (2009–2011), Šećeranac Beograd (2012)–2013), Hajduk Veljko (2012–201x)
- Nnaemeka Ajuru – Metalac G.M. (2005–2006)
- Amuda Alabi – Železničar Novi Sad (19__–19__) Note: before 1996
- Victor Amos – Trayal Kruševac (2022–2023)
- Franklin Ayodele – Loznica (2008–2009)
- Casey - Jedinstvo Ub (2006-2007)
- Eleanya Kelechi Collins – Tekstilac Ites (2003–2004), Bane Raška (2004–2005)
- Ezeh Chinedu – Kosanica (2004–2008), Jedinstvo Ub (2007–(2008)
- **Ifeanyi Emeghara** – Teleoptik (2003–2004)
- Mark Geff – Tutin (2004–2006), Bačka Bačka Palanka (2005–2006), Jedinstvo Ub (2006–2007), Komgrap Beograd (2007–2008), Mladi Obilić (2008–2009), FK Dorćol (2009–2010)
- Anthony Agha Ibiam – ŽAK Kikinda (2008)–2009), Radnički Nova Pazova (2008–(2009), Balkanski Dimitrovgrad (2009–2010)
- Ifeanyi Igbodo – Banja Beograd (2004–2007)
- John Igbodo – **Bor** (2020–present)
- Charming Temiloluwa Imabeh – BASK Beograd (2015–2016)
- Victor Jideonwor – Dragačevo Guča (2005–2007), Lokomotiva Beograd (2007–2008)
- Oladipupo Martins – Teleoptik (2003–2005, 2006–2007)
- Samuel Nnamani – OFK Tabane (2014–2015)
- Obiora Odita – FK Vučje (2002–2003)
- Obele Okeke Onyebuchi – OFK Mladenovac (2003–2004), FK Ljubija (2008–(2009)
- Henry Okoro – Budućnost Valjevo (2003–2004)
- Reuben Okoro – Mačva Šabac (2014–2016)
- Sunday Patrick Okoro – Radnički Pirot (2008–2010)
- Solomon Oladele – Sinđelić Niš (2009–2010)
- Celestine Olisa – Polimlje Prijepolje (200_–200_)
- Ifeanyi Victor Onyilo – Sloga Požega (2008–2009)
- Peter Taiye Oladotun – Radnički Beograd (2006–2007), PKB Padinska Skela (2008–2009), Radnički Kragujevac (2009–2010)
- Raphael Remigus Governor - **OFK Kikinda** (202_-present)
- Aminu Sani - Radnički Kragujevac (2008-2009)
- Okomayin Segun Onimisi - Dubočica Leskovac (2020-2022)
- Sodiq Suraj - Teleoptik (2008-2009)
- Amaechi Nwabunwane Tochukwu – Dinamo Pančevo (2007–2008)

== North Macedonia ==
The players that have played for the Macedonian National Team are in **bold**, the others have played since 1992.

- Milan Aleksić – Dinamo Vranje (201_–2015)
- Darko Aleksovski – Lokomotiva Beograd (200_–201_)
- Vebi Alievski – FK 1. Maj Agroruma (2010–2012)
- Aleksa Amanović – FK Teleoptik (2014–2015), IMT Beograd (2015–2016)
- Stefan Andrić – Radnički Kragujevac (2014–2016), Šumadija Kragujevac (2016–2017)
- Ljupče Arsovski – Topličanin Prokuplje
- Boban Avramovski – **Turbina Vreoci** (2008–present)
- Sava Avramovski – OFK Beograd (2018–2020, 2022–(2023), BSK Borča (2022)–2023), **Zvezdara** (2023–present)
- Albert Bajrami – **FK Bačka 1901** (2013–present)
- Arbën Biboski – Jedinstvo Smederevo (2006–2008)
- Omer Biševac – Big Bul Bačinci (2008–2009)
- Vlado Blazeski – Sloga Kraljevo (2001–2005)
- Nikola Bogdanovski – FK Teleoptik (2016–2017), Radnički Beograd (2017–2018)
- Bojan Bogojevski – Šumadija Jagnjilo (2007–2009), **Palilulac Beograd** (2010–present)
- **Dragan Čadikovski** – Kolubara Lazarevac (1997–2001, 2014–2015, 2016–2019), **TEK Sloga Veliki Crljeni** (2019–present)
- Ivica Cvetanovski – Sloboda Užice (1989–1993, 1993–1996)
- Milan Cvetanovski – FK Voždovac (2001–2003), BPI Pekar (2003–2004), Železničar Beograd (2004–2005), Grafičar Beograd (2007–2008)
- Olivio Dautovski – Topličanin Prokuplje (1989–1995)
- Igor Denkić – Železničar Niš (200_–200_), **Car Konstantin** (200_–present)
- Lazar Djorejlievski – FK Dorćol (2016–2017), **IMT Beograd** (2017–present)
- Boris Dobrić – **Šumadija Kragujevac** (201_–2018), **Radnički Svilajnac** (2018–present)
- **Mario Đurovski** – OFK Mladenovac (2003)–2004), FK Sopot (2003–(2004)
- **Milko Đurovski** – Čukarički Stankom (1979–1980)
- Argjent Gafuri – FK Jošanica (200_–200_)
- Georgijevski – Rudar Bor (1989–1993)
- Sašo Gjoreski – Radnički Sombor (____–____)
- Darko Grozdanoski – BASK Beograd (2015–2017), Žarkovo (2017)–2018), **Prva Iskra Barić** (2017–present)
- Blerim Gudjufi – Spektrum Novi Sad (2011–2012)
- Jovan Gunev – Trajal Kruševac (200_–2008)
- Ilijevski – Rudar Bor (1988–1997)
- Nelson Iseni – FK Vinča (200_–2010), **FK Resnik** (2010–present)
- Bojan Ivanov – **Balkan Mirijevo** (2013–present)
- Filip Jančevski – **Hajduk Kula** (2014–present)
- **Čedomir Janevski** – Železničar Niš (1980–1982)
- Aleksa Jordanov - Trayal Kruševac (2022–2023), Budućnost Dobanovci (2023–2024)
- Stefan Josifoski – Sopot (2012)–2013), Jedinstvo Stara Pazova (2012–2014), Radnički Beograd (2014–2017), **Jedinstvo Surčin** (2017–present)
- Strahinja Krstevski – **Grafičar** (2019–present)
- Petar Krstić – Radan Lebane (201_–201_), Sloga Leskovac (201_–2015)
- **Vlade Lazarevski** – 14. Oktobar Kruševac (2002–(2003), 2003–(2004), **Temnić Lipa Varvarin** (2015–present)
- **Aleksandar Lazevski** – Teleoptik (2005–2008, 2008–2010), **Vršac** (2018–present)
- Lazo Lipovski – FK Bor (199_–199_)
- Branislav "Bane" Manevski – Lokomotiva Beograd (2016–2018), **GSP Polet Dorćol** (2018–present)
- Boban Marić – Šumadija Jagnjilo (2007–2008), Radnički Nova Pazova (2008–2009)
- Marjan Markoski – Radnički Zrenjanin (201_–2015)
- Zoran Martinovski – Polet Beograd (1997–1998)
- Igor Matenicarski – Sloga Požega (2003–2005), FK Crnokosa (200_–2008, 20__–2014)
- Kliment Nastovski – FK Teleoptik (2004–2006)
- Boban Nikolovski – FK Bor (1995–1996, 2003–(2004), Železničar Beograd (1999)–2000, 2001–(2002), Rudar Bor (200_–2006)
- Nikola Novevski - Radnički Stara Pazova (2020-2021), Bečej (2021)-2022), Radnički Zrenjanin (2021-(2022), **Bačka Bačka Palanka** (2022–present)
- Dušan Pavlov – OFK Kikinda (2007–2010), FK Bačka Topola (2010–2011)
- Marko Pavlov – ŽAK Sombor (2012–2013)
- Petrovski – FK Bor (1993–1996)
- Bojan Petrovski – Aluminijum Niš (2006–2007)
- **Predrag Ranđelović** – FK Teleoptik (2008–2011)
- **Stevica Ristić** – FK Vršac (2000–2001), Jedinstvo Vršac (2001–2002)
- **Dušan Savić** – **Dubočica Leskovac** (____–2002,2020–present)
- Đorđe Serpak – Trudbenik Beograd (199_–1993)
- Aleksandar Simjanovski – Topličanin Prokuplje
- Ivan Simjanovski – Topličanin Prokuplje
- Marko Simunovikj – IM Rakovica (2017–2018), Teleoptik (2018-2022)
- Jovan Sovreski – FK Voždovac (2009)–2010), FK Dorćol (2009–(2010)
- **Perica Stančeski** – FK Teleoptik (2004–2006)
- **Ostoja Stjepanović** – FK Teleoptik (2003–2005)
- Milan Stoilković – **Hajduk Beograd** (2009)–2010, 2011–2012, 2013–present), Hajduk Šimanovci (2009–(2010), FK Voždovac (2010–2011), Slavija Beograd (2012–2013)
- Nikola Stojanov – FK Brodarac (2015–(2016), **Lokomotiva Beograd** (2015)–2016, 2018–present), IMT Novi Beograd (2016–2018)
- Nikola Stojanović – BSK Bujanovac (2001–2005, 2017–2018), Dinamo Vranje (2005–2013, 2016–2017), Železničar Vr.Banja (2007–2008), Radnik Surdulica (2008–2009, 2013–2016)
- **Milan Stojanovski** – BASK Beograd (2009)–2010), Lokomotiva Beograd (2009–2011), FK Kovačevac (2010–(2011)
- **Aleksandar Todorovski** – Radnički Beograd (2002–2005)
- Miloš Tošeski – **Brodarac** (201_–present)
- Nikola Tošeski – **FK Brodarac** (2013–2015, (2016)–2017, 2019–present), FK Smederevo (2015)–2016, 2018–2019), IM Rakovica (2015–(2016)
- Vladimir Tošeski – FK Brodarac (2014–2015), **FK Smederevo** (2015–present)
- Haris Tutić – **FK Tutin** (2014–present)
- Lazar Vidić – **Šumadija Kragujevac** (2006–2009, 2017–present), Radnički Kragujevac (2009–2011)

== Northern Ireland ==
- John Barrons – IMT Novi Beograd (2001–2002)

== Norway ==
- Bojan Jakovic – Jedinstvo Kalenić (200_–2006), FK 1. Maj Ruma (2008–2011)

== Palestine ==
- Hani Odeh – **Železnik** (201_–present)

== Poland ==
- Tadeusz Batkowski – Kadima Bečkerek (192_–1924), Kosovo Kikinda (1924–192_)
- Aleksander Čišič – Radnički Beograd (2012–2013), FK Jošanica (2013)–2014), Krušik Valjevo (2013–(2014), Dinamo Pančevo (2014–(2015), Dolina Padina (2015)–2016), Železničar Pančevo (2015–2016)
- Jan Nosal – Jedinstvo Stević (2002–2005, 2006–200_, 20__–2014)

== Portugal ==
- Maki Faria - BASK Beograd (2020-2021)
- Vuk Kovacevic – Budućnost Dobanovci (2014)–2015), BASK Beograd (2014–2016, 2018–2019), FK Žarkovo (2016–2018), **Crvena zvezda MML** (2019–present)
- Ivan Mladenović – Sinđelić Niš (2016–2017), **Car Konstantin** (2017–present)
- Angelo Stevanovic – **Srem Jakovo** (2013–present)

== Puerto Rico ==
- **Chris Megaloudis** – Radnički Obrenovac (2009–2010)

== Romania ==
- Franc Baroul – Kadima V. Bečkerek (1924–1925)
- Ionel Carabas – Palilulac Beograd (197_–19__)
- Ioan Răzvan Chiriţă – Jedinstvo Petrovac (199_–199_)
- Mihail Costescu – Radnički Vršac (1998–1999)
- Olimpiu Deac – Budućnost Srpska Crnja (1990–1991)
- Ștefan Dobrescu – **FK Sopot** (2017–present)
- Dimitru Drindea – Sloga Petrovac na Mlavi (1990–1991)
- Ștefan Dumitru – Sloga Petrovac na Mlavi (1990–1991)
- Alberto Emanuel – FK Vršac (199_–199_)
- Aurel Han – Zorka Subotica (1990–1991)
- Gheorghe Iordan – Sloga Petrovac na Mlavi (1990–1991)
- József Kezdi – Viktorija Vršac (1936–1937)
- Kiril Kostel – Budućnost Alibunar (199_–199_)
- Lăcătuș – Jugoslavija Jabuka (1937–19__)
- Romeo Malak – FK Vršac (199_–199_)
- Gheorghe Mureşan – Budućnost Srpska Crnja (1990–1991)
- Marinel Pascu – Radnički Bajmok (2002–2003), FK Bečej (200_–200_)
- Păunescu – Grafičar Beograd (1939–1940)
- Branimir Pavlov – Jedinstvo Novi Bečej (1991–1992, 1992–(1993)
- Dario Todor – FK Vršac (2015–2016)
- Mateja Vezilici – JNA team (1945)

== Russia ==
- Nikolai Alexeyev – Ruski SK (1924–192_)
- Chakarev – Borac Čačak (1966–1967)
- Asteri Filaktov – Palilulac Beograd, Bor (1964–1965)
- Ilya Guchmazov – Grafičar Beograd (2020–2021)
- Andrei Guzienko – Bečej (1990–1992)
- Igor – Maksim Divnić Zemun (1945)
- Marko Jeremis – **Mladi Radnik** (20__–present)
- Uchuk Kuldinov – Ruski SK (1930–193_), Sinđelić Beograd (1937–1941)
- Maksim Lada – Grafičar Beograd (2018–2020), Brodarac (2020-2021), Žarkovo (2021-2022)
- Konstantin Lalionov – Ruski SK (1924–192x)
- Aleksandr Minayev – Budućnost Valjevo (1990–1991)
- Aleksandr Nazarko - **Bor** (2020–present)
- Danil Pechenkin – Grafičar Beograd (2017–2019)
- Anton Pushin – Građanski Ćuprija (1937–1938)
- Dmitri Shikhovtsev – Radnički Kragujevac (2008–2010)
- Stefan Shilovtsev – Momčilo Leskovac (1923–1924)
- Aleksandr Shtcheglov – Jug Bogdan Prokuplje (1919–1925)
- Fedor Solovei – Brodarac (2022–2023)
- Gennadi Soshenko – Budućnost Valjevo (1990–1991)
- Igor Vasilyev – Ruski SK (1924–192_)
- Rastislav Vasilyev – Ruski SK (1924–192_)
- Vladimir Vinogradov – Ruski SK (1924–192_)
- Sergei Vitvinskiy – Ruski SK (192_–192_)
- Vorontsov – Bor (1952–1953)
- Mikhail Yagovlev – Ruski SK (1924–192x)
- Alexei Yashuk – Palilulac Beograd (2010–2011)
- Sergei Yerniev – Mačva Šabac (1919)

== Saudi Arabia ==
- Yazid Jashan – Zemun (2021–2023)

== Senegal ==
- Mamadou Diarra – Teleoptik (2008–2009)

== Sierra Leone ==
- **Kelfala Marah** – Rudar Kostolac (2005–2010)

== Slovakia ==
- Boris Durgala – Dolina Padina (2011–201x)
- Silvester Galamboš – FK Palić (200_–200_), Radnički Bajmok (200_–2010)
- Vladimír Gombár – Srem Sr. Mitrovica (1993–1994)
- Ladislav Gonda – FK Majdanpek (1937–193_)
- Boris Hesek – Bane Raška (2013–2014)
- **Ján Podhradský** – SŠK Bački Petrovac (1933–1935), SK Štefanik Stara Pazova (1939–1941)
- **Boris Sekulić** – Grafičar Beograd (2009–2010), FK Beograd (2010–2011)

== Slovenia ==
The players that have played for the Slovenian national team are in **bold**, the others have played since 1992.

- Živko Aleksandrić – FK Prijevor (2008–2012), FK Bačka Topola (2012–2013), **Partizan Bumbarevo Brdo** (2013–present)
- Saša Bosilj – Železničar Lajkovac (2002–2003)
- Marko Drljača – **Jedinstvo Novi Bečej** (2004–2006, 2006–2013, 2013–present), Tekstilac Odžaci (2006)–2007), FK Brezovica (2013)–2014)
- Nermin Horvat – Rudar Kostolac (2004–2008)
- Nebojša Ivanović – Radnički Sombor (2013–2014), **Bratstvo Prigrevica** (2015–present)
- Safet Jahič – FK Teleoptik (2006–2007)
- Boris Klabec – FK Vršac (2009–2010), Dolina Padina (2010–2011)
- Dušan Makarić – Grafičar Beograd (2006–2007), BSK Batajnica (2007–2008, (2014)–2015), Železničar Beograd (2008–2010), Posovac Boljevci (2010–2011), Radnički Nova Pazova (2011–2012), FK Sopot (2012–2013), FK Zemun (2013–2014), Sremac Vojka (2014–(2015)
- Vladimir Mandić – Banat Zrenjanin (2013–2014), OFK Vršac (2018)–2019), Železničar Pančevo (2018–2020), Bratstvo Prigrevica (2020)–2021), **Cement Beočin** (2020–present)
- Mladen Marković – Kabel Novi Sad (2007–2008)
- Vladimir Ostojić – Mačva Šabac (199_–199_)
- Denis Salkunič – Mačva Šabac (2010–201_)
- Andrej Vitali – Hajduk Beograd (2014)–2015), **FK Baćevac** (2014–present)

== Sweden ==
- Jovan Jakovljević – Bačka Subotica (2017–2018)
- Philip Milenković – Radnički Obrenovac (2010–2011)

== Switzerland ==
- Toplica Avramović – Zvezdara (2011–2012), Bulbuderac Beograd (2012)–2013), Dorćol (2012–201x)
- Pajtim Badalli – FK 14. Oktobar (2014–2015)
- Milan Basrak – Sopot (2012)–2013), Mačva Šabac (2012–(2013)
- Mihailo Bogicevic – Loznica (2019–2021)
- Boško Borenović – Zemun (1991–1999, 2006–2007)
- Darko Damjanović – Mačva Šabac (2011–2012)
- Aleksandar Djuric – Hajduk Beograd (2009–2010)
- Svetlan Kosić – IMT Beograd (2014–2015)
- Aleksandar Njeguš – Zlatibor Čajetina (2017–2021)
- Zeljko Ognjanovic – Šapine (2003–201x)
- Miloš Opačić – **Radnički Pirot** (2023–present)
- Emil Osmanovic – Jošanica (2014)–2015), Železničar Lajkovac (2015–2016), Mladi Radnik (2019–2020), Tutin (2021–2022)
- Nemanja Petrovic – Jedinstvo Paraćin (2021–2022)
- **Milaim Rama** – Beselidhja (1996–1997)
- Luka Stević – Teleoptik (2019–2020)
- Aleksandar Todorović – Mačva Šabac (2011–2013), Mladost Bački Jarak (2016–2017)
- Yves Vladislav – Teleoptik (2016–2018), OFK Beograd (2019–2020)

== Tanzania ==
- **Morice Abraham** – **RFK Novi Sad** (2023–present)
- **Nassor Hamoud** – Šumadija Aranđelovac (2020–2021), Žarkovo (2000–2000. 2021–2002)

== Turkey ==
- Serif Çoroğlu – BSK Borča (1998–1999)
- Günkut Özer – Sinđelić Niš (2014)–2015), Palilulac Niš (2014–(2015)

== Uganda ==
- **Abraham Ndugwa** – Budućnost Dobanovci (2021–2022)

== Ukraine ==
- Maksym Demchenko – Palić (1990–1991)
- Gantchev – Bačka Subotica (1994–1995)
- Andriy Gordon – Sloboda Užice (2000–2002), Sloga Požega (2006–2008)
- Serhiy Gordon – Sloboda Užice (2000–2002), Sloga Požega (2006–2008)
- Sasha Havrlyenko – AIK Bačka Topola (1991–1998)
- Aleksandar Pisarenko – Proleter Majdanpek (194_–195_)
- Makariy Tkachenko – Metalac Bor (1953–1955), Proleter Majdanpek (1962–1963)
- Vitaliy Tolmachyov – Mladost Končarevo (1991–1992), Palić (1992–1993), Bačka Subotica (1994–1996)
- Trile – Palilulac Beograd (1962–1963)
- Maksym Zinakov – Radnički Nova Pazova (2008–2009)

== United States ==
- Aleksandar Gluvačević – Dorćol (2016–2017), Dunav Stari Banovci (2017–2018), Vršac (2018–2019)
- Slaviša Krstić – Teleoptik (2005–2008)
- Vuk Latinovich – Brodarac (2014–2017)
- Luka Nedić – Loznica (2019–2020)
- Michael Palacio – Radnički Obrenovac (2009–2010)
- George Pantelic – Morava Velika Plana (2010)–2011), Zemun (2010–2013)
- Danilo Radjen – Teleoptik (2019–2020)
- Peter Thomas – Bane Raška (2003–2008)
- Aleksandar Thomas Višić – Resnik (2011)–2012), Zemun (2012–2013)

== Uzbekistan ==
- Rauf Mirolim – Omladinac Pirot (1923–1925)

== External sources ==
- National-Football-Teams
- Srbijafudbal
- EUFO
- Weltfussball
- Soccerway
- Superliga
- Fudbalske lige SiCG
- Zerodic
- rsssf, Ital-players-abroad
- rsssf, Arg players
- Brazil transfers
- YU Football
- League stats 2004-07 EX SiCG Fudbal
- Macedonian players abroad at Utrinski
- Derbi pre derbija
