= List of FK Vojvodina players =

This is a list of all the football players that have played for FK Vojvodina since its founding, in 1914. Players who appeared in at least one domestic league, domestic cup, or European competition match are included. Players are not included if they appeared only in friendlies and tournaments, or were on trials.

Last updated 21 July 2018.

== A ==
- (Hungary) Eugen Ábrahám-Saraz II (1924–26)
- (Serbia) Jenő Ábrahám-Saraz I (1921–24)
- Zoltán Abt (1923)
- (Croatia) Zdenko Adamović (1985–86)
- (Ghana) Sadick Adams (2009–10)
- (Serbia) Miodrag Adžić (1973–75)
- (Nigeria) Nnaemeka Ajuru (2009–13)
- (Serbia) Nikola Aksentijević (2016–17)
- (Serbia) Aleksić (1925–29)
- (Serbia) Danijel Aleksić (2006–10)
- (Serbia) Kosta Aleksić (1946–47)
- (Serbia) Ljubiša Aleksić (1996–98)
- (Serbia) Mirko Aleksić (1994–95, 97–00)
- (Serbia) Miroslav Aleksić (1989–90)
- (Serbia) Rajko Aleksić (1965–74, 75–77)
- (Serbia) Veljko Aleksić (1958–66)
- (Bosnia and Herzegovina) Dušan Alempić (1986–87)
- (Serbia) Alimpić (1931–32)
- (Serbia) Enver Alivodić (2012–15)
- (Serbia) Darko Anić (1995–96)
- (Serbia) Andrić (1921)
- (Montenegro) Dušan Andrić (1969–70)
- (Montenegro) Dragan Aničić (1984–86)
- (Serbia) Branislav Anikić (1977–78)
- (Serbia) Nikola Antić (2015–18)
- (Serbia) Antonić (1919–20, 22, 24, 26–31)
- (Ghana) Yaw Antwi (2010–13)
- (Ghana) Stephen Appiah (2011–12)
- (Serbia) Lazar Arsić (2017–18)
- (Serbia) Slobodan Arsin (1985–86)
- (Serbia) Elmir Asani (2013–15)
- (Serbia) Halil Asani (2000–02)
- (Serbia) Nikola Ašćerić (2015–17)
- (Serbia) Vlada Avramov (1997–01)
- (Serbia) Veljko Avramović (1936–38, 46–51)
- (North Macedonia) Daniel Avramovski (2017–18)

== B ==
- (Bosnia and Herzegovina) Đorđe Babalj (2006–08)
- (Serbia) Milan Babić (1983–85)
- (Serbia) Siniša Babić (2015–17)
- (Serbia) Marko Bačanin (2016–17)
- (Serbia) Vojislav Bajagić (1932–33)
- (Serbia) Toma Bajazet (1938–40)
- (Serbia) Srđan Bajčetić (1992–94)
- (Serbia) Endre Bajúsz (1998–99)
- (Serbia) Michal Baláž (1990–91)
- (Serbia) Nikola Balmožan (1931–32)
- (Montenegro) Savo Barac (1994–96)
- (Senegal) Yves Baraye
- (Croatia) Mario Barić (2013–14)
- (Brazil) Lucas Barros
- (Serbia) Milorad Basta (1972–73)
- (Serbia) Bašić (1926–28)
- (Montenegro) Radoslav Batak (1997–03)
- (Bosnia and Herzegovina) Fuad Bećarević (1968–69)
- (Serbia) Samid Beganović (1985–88)
- (Serbia) Milan Bekić (1931–39)
- (Serbia) Dragoljub Bekvalac (1980–84)
- (Montenegro) Žarko Belada (2000–04)
- (Serbia) Ilija Belić (1954–55, 57–59)
- (Serbia) Milan Belić (1997–02, 03–05)
- (Ghana) Joseph Bempah (2016–18)
- (Serbia) Stevan Bena (1956–63)
- (Serbia) Emir Bihorac (2001–05)
- (Serbia) Bikšić (1925–27)
- (Bosnia and Herzegovina) Nemanja Bilbija (2009–13)
- (Serbia) Stevan Birovljev (1968–70)
- (Serbia) Nikoslav Bjegović (1995–98)
- (Serbia) Imre Blanarik (1952–59)
- (North Macedonia) Dragoljub Blažić (1955–57)
- (Serbia) Mileta Blažić (1946–49)
- (Serbia) Igor Bogdanović (1993–94, 98–02)
- (North Macedonia) Todor Bogojev (1946–48)
- (Serbia) Bojović (1937–38)
- (Serbia) Milan Bojović (2011–13)
- (Democratic Republic of the Congo) Jonathan Bolingi
- (Serbia) Laslo Borbelj (1959–62)
- (Hungary) János Borsó (1985–86)
- (Serbia) Jovo Bosančić (1988–92)
- (Serbia) Vujadin Boškov (1948–61)
- (Montenegro) Ivan Bošković (2006–07)
- (Serbia) Momčilo Bošković (1969–70, 71–75, 76–77)
- (Serbia) Dragan Bošnjak (1976–80)
- (Serbia) Borivoj Bošnjaković (1938–40)
- (Serbia) Radivoj Božić (1936–40)
- (Serbia) Radovan Božin (1926–36)
- (Serbia) Božović (1995–96)
- (Croatia) Slavko Bralić
- (Serbia) Vladimir Branković (2011–13)
- (Serbia) Vidak Bratić (1996–00)
- (Serbia) Željko Brkić (2006–11)
- (Croatia) Zdravko Brkljačić (1959–60)
- (Serbia) Živko Brzak (1937–38)
- (Serbia) Predrag Brzaković (1990–93)
- (Serbia) Ivica Brzić (1964–72)
- (Serbia) Vladimir Buač (2003–09)
- (Serbia) Milan Bubalo (2017–18)
- (Serbia) Ivan Budanović (1975–76)
- (Serbia) Milan Bugarski (1929–30)
- (Serbia) Milorad Bukvić (1999–00)
- (Serbia) Nedeljko Bulatović (1957–58, 60–62)
- (Serbia) Miljan Bulja (1932–37)
- (Serbia) Vladimir Bunić (2004–05)
- (Bosnia and Herzegovina) Dženan Bureković (2016–17)
- (Serbia) Buštrović (1928–30)
- (Romania) Mihai Butean

== C ==
- (Serbia) Milan Cakić (2000–01)
- (Jamaica) Norman Campbell
- (Argentina) Mauro Carabajal (1998–99)
- (Montenegro) Lazar Carević
- (Canada) Stefan Cebara (2017–18)
- (Greece) Diamantis Chouchoumis (2018–19)
- (Serbia) Saša Cilinšek (1998–05)
- (Serbia) Zoran Cilinšek (1996–99, 00–01)
- (Serbia) Tibor Cimbal (1984–85, 86–87)
- (Serbia) Vasa Conić (1932–34)
- (Liberia) Sekou Conneh
- (Serbia) Cvejanov (1929–30)
- (Serbia) Draško Cvetković (1971–74)
- (Serbia) Dušan Cvetković (1948–49)
- (Serbia) Nemanja Cvetković (2003–04)

== Č ==
- (Serbia) Uroš Čakovac (1914–27)
- (Serbia) Aleksandar Čanović (2004–05)
- (Czech Republic) Josef Čapek (1920)
- (Serbia) Branislav Čepski (1952)
- (Croatia) Karlo Čerić (1940–41)
- (Serbia) Aleksandar Čičovački (1982–83)
- (Serbia) Zoran Čikić (1985–86)
- (Serbia) Saša Čolak (1986–87)
- (Serbia) Đorđe Čotra (2006–07)
- (Serbia) Mladen Čović (2005–07)
- (Serbia) Nemanja Čović (2010–11)
- (Hungary) Ladiszlav Csányi (1967–69)

== Ć ==
- (Serbia) Živojin Ćeremov (1914–19, 21, 23)
- (Serbia) Zvonko Ćirić (1980–86)
- (Serbia) Đorđe Ćurčić (1978–82)
- (Serbia) Miroslav Ćurčić (1984–88)
- (Serbia) Goran Ćurko (1989–91)
- (Serbia) Saša Ćurko (2013–16)

== D ==
- (Serbia) Zoran Dakić (1966–70)
- (Serbia) Željko Dakić (1985–86, 88–91)
- (Serbia) Sava Damjanović (1926–29, 31–34)
- (Serbia) Vasa Damjanović (1934–37)
- (Serbia) Željko Damjanović (2000–01)
- (Hungary) Pál Dárdai (1985–86)
- (Serbia) Milan Davidov (2006–07)
- (Croatia) Matej Delač (2013–14)
- (Nigeria) Dele
- (Serbia) Miloš Deletić (2012–13)
- (Gabon) Anselme Délicat (1983–86)
- (Montenegro) Stefan Denković (2013–14)
- (Angola) Depú
- (Serbia) Ranko Despotović (2003–08)
- (Serbia) Mladen Devetak (2016–17)
- (Hungary) Dezső (1920)
- (Bosnia and Herzegovina) Vladan Dimitrić (1978–81, 82–87)
- (Serbia) Dominik Dinga (2015–16)
- (Serbia) Dobanovački (1923)
- (Serbia) Saša Dobrić (1998–08)
- (Serbia) Dobrović (1919, 21)
- (Croatia) Marjan Dolanski (1924–26)
- (Serbia) Živko Dopuđa (1990–91)
- (Serbia) Draganić (1936–37)
- (Montenegro) Žarko Dragaš (1996–98)
- (Serbia) Dragić (1994–95)
- (Bosnia and Herzegovina) Dalibor Dragić (1997–00)
- (Montenegro) Radislav Dragićević (1994–95)
- (Serbia) Dragišić (1929–30)
- (Serbia) Milenko Dragojević (1976–79, 83–84)
- (Serbia) Dragutinović (1995–96)
- (Serbia) Dragan Dragutinović (2004–05)
- (Serbia) Milivoj Drakulić (1932–33)
- (Serbia) Saša Drakulić (2005–06, 07–08)
- (Serbia) Dražić (1937–38)
- (Montenegro) Zdravko Drinčić (1997–99, 02–04)
- (Serbia) Damir Drinić (2005–11)
- (Bosnia and Herzegovina) Nenad Drljača (1991–93)
- (Croatia) Žarko Drmanović (1985–87)
- (Serbia) Stevan Dudak (1962–63)
- (Hungary) Sándor Dudás (1922–26)
- (Serbia) Ištvan Dudaš (1992–93)
- (Croatia) Nedeljko Dugandžija (1961–64)
- (Serbia) Dujšin (1920)
- (Serbia) Ljubiša Dunđerski (1995–98, 04–06)
- (Croatia) Josip Duvančić (1958–60)

== Dž ==
- (Serbia) Svetozar Džanić (1932–36)

== Đ ==
- (Serbia) Marko Đalović (2008–09)
- (Bosnia and Herzegovina) Ognjen Đelmić (2017–18)
- (Serbia) Miodrag Đinđić (1973–76)
- (Serbia) Đorđević (1936–38)
- (Serbia) Lazar Đorđević (2018–19)
- (Croatia) Svemir Đorđić (1966–68)
- (Serbia) Marko Đorović (2000–03)
- (Montenegro) Milonja Đukić (1986–88)
- (Serbia) Mihajlo Đuran (1982–83)
- (Serbia) Srđan Đurđević (2003–04)
- (Montenegro) Stefan Đurđević (2016–18)
- (Serbia) Igor Đurić (2004–09, 12–16)
- (Serbia) Milan Đurić (2018–19)
- (Serbia) Milisav Đurić (1934–39)
- (Montenegro) Duško Đurišić (2009–10)
- (Serbia) Marko Đurišić (2016–17)
- (Serbia) Božidar Đurković (1995–98)
- (Serbia) Milan Đurović (1982–86)
- (Serbia) Stefan Đurović (2004–06)
- (Serbia) Zoran Đurović (1979–80, 81–83)

== E ==
- (Bosnia and Herzegovina) Obren Ekmečić (1961–62)

== F ==
- (Serbia) Jožef Fabri (1978–80)
- (Montenegro) Ivan Fatić (2013–14)
- (Slovenia) Željko Filipovič
- (Ivory Coast) Ismaël Béko Fofana (2018–19)
- (Serbia) Ivica Francišković (2000–05)
- (Ghana) Abraham Frimpong (2011–12)

== G ==
- (Serbia) Dragan Gaćeša (1982–84, 85–90)
- (Serbia) Mijat Gaćinović (2012–15)
- (Serbia) Gagić (1929–30)
- (Croatia) Jovan Gajdašević (1990–91)
- (Serbia) Nikola Gajić (2017–18)
- (Bosnia and Herzegovina) Aleksandar Galić (2002–03)
- (Serbia) Gavanski (1914)
- (Serbia) Nenad Gavrić (2016–17)
- (Serbia) Gavrilović (1919, 21–22)
- Geto (1929–30)
- (Georgia (country)) Guram Giorbelidze
- (North Macedonia) Mario Gjurovski (2007–10)
- (Serbia) Uroš Glogovac (2002–03)
- (Montenegro) Igor Gluščević (1994–96)
- (Croatia) Dejan Godar (1998–99)
- (Serbia) Dejan Govedarica (1992–96)
- (Bosnia and Herzegovina) Daniel Graovac
- (Netherlands) Serginho Greene (2012–14)
- (Serbia) Vasa Grgarov (1924–26, 28–30)
- (Serbia) Luka Grgić (2013–15)
- (Serbia) Miloš Grlić (2002–03, 05–06)
- (North Macedonia) Vlatko Grozdanoski (2007–10)
- (Serbia) Aleksandar Gruber (2001–02)
- (Serbia) Lazar Grubor (1979–86)
- (Serbia) Duško Grujić (1994–98)
- (Serbia) Milan Grujić (1973–76)
- (Serbia) Miroslav Grumić (2003–05)
- (Croatia) Petar Gudelj (1983–84)
- (Serbia) Ivan Gvozdenović (2009–10)

== H ==
- Fritz Haász (1940–41)
- (Croatia) Ronald Habi (1998–02)
- (Serbia) Robert Hadnađ (1984–86)
- (Serbia) Dragoljub Hadžić (1952–55)
- (Serbia) Zoran Hajdić (1987–94, 99–00)
- (Serbia) Sead Halilagić (1992–93, 94–96, 97–98)
- (Serbia) Antun Herceg (1949–50)
- Hesko (1923–24)
- (Serbia) Petar Hevizi (1958–59, 62–64)
- (Serbia) Franjo Hirman (1951–54)
- Rudolf Hofman (1932–34)

== I ==
- (Serbia) Milan Ičin (1979–80)
- (Serbia) Ignjačev (1914–19, 21, 24)
- (Serbia) Brana Ilić (2010–12)
- (Serbia) Georgije Ilić (2012–15)
- (Serbia) Ivan Ilić (1996–97)
- (Serbia) Josif Ilić (1976–86)
- (Serbia) Marko Ilić (2015–18)
- (Brazil) Matheus Índio
- (Serbia) Dimitrije Injac (1999–00)
- (Montenegro) Mirko Ivanić (2013–16)
- (Serbia) Jovan Ivašković (1975–76)
- (Serbia) Zvonko Ivezić (1967–76)
- (Serbia) Ivković (1920)
- (Serbia) Aleksandar Ivoš (1954–61)

== J ==
- (Bosnia and Herzegovina) Dragan Jablan (1977–78, 79–83)
- (Serbia) Milorad Jablanov (1952–54)
- (Bosnia and Herzegovina) Miroslav Jakovljević (1977–79)
- (Serbia) Budimir Janošević (2011–12)
- (Bosnia and Herzegovina) Slobodan Janjuš (1977–78)
- (Bulgaria) Zoran Janković (1998–00)
- (Serbia) Spasoje Jelačić (1985–86, 91–92)
- (Bulgaria) Veljko Jelenković
- (Serbia) Branko Jelić (2003–04)
- (Serbia) Dobrivoj Jergić (1961–64)
- (Serbia) Goran Jezdimirović (1990–96)
- (Serbia) Jovan Jocković I (1914)
- (Serbia) Svetozar Jocković II (1914)
- (Serbia) Slaviša Jokanović (1988–90)
- (Serbia) Dragan Jokić (1986–88, 91–92)
- (Serbia) Đorđe Jokić (2012–13)
- (Bosnia and Herzegovina) Nikola Jokišić (1991–92)
- (Serbia) Dejan Joksimović (1988–89)
- (Serbia) Nebojša Joksimović (2003–04)
- (Serbia) Saša Josipović (1996–97)
- (Serbia) Dušan Jovančić (2015–17)
- (Serbia) Milan Jovanić (2013–15)
- (Serbia) Mladen Jovanić (1983–86)
- (Serbia) Slobodan Jovanić (1972–73)
- (Serbia) Jovanović (1920–21, 24–26)
- (Australia) Aleksandar Jovanović (2007–11)
- (Serbia) Dragan Jovanović (1987–88)
- (Serbia) Ivica Jovanović (2017–18)
- (Serbia) Jovica Jovanović (1936–40)
- (Serbia) Marko Jovanović (2001–06)
- (Serbia) Milan Jovanović (1999–03)
- (Serbia) Slobodan Jovanović (1970–73)
- (Serbia) Željko Jovanović (1997–98)
- (Serbia) Aleksandar Jovević (2001–02)
- (Montenegro) Drago Jovičević (1969–70)
- (Serbia) Milan Jović (1999–00)
- (Croatia) Željko Jurčić (1972–79)

== K ==
- (Serbia) Gojko Kačar (2003–08)
- (Serbia) Damir Kahriman (2005–08)
- (Montenegro) Asmir Kajević
- (Montenegro) Vasko Kalezić (2017–18)
- (Serbia) Aleksandar Kanazir (1931–34)
- (Bosnia and Herzegovina) Mehmed Karamehmedović (1969–71)
- (Serbia) Dejan Karan (2009–13)
- (North Macedonia) Stevan Karanfilović (1946–51)
- (Serbia) Dragan Karanov (2014–15)
- (Serbia) Željko Karanović (2000–02)
- (Croatia) Veldin Karić (1992–93)
- (Austria) Goran Kartalija (1988–91)
- (Serbia) Atila Kasaš (1985–86)
- (Serbia) Aleksandar Katai (2009–13)
- (Serbia) Kepić (1938–39)
- (Serbia) Aleksandar Kesić (2007–13)
- (Serbia) Dušan Kesić (1971–72)
- (Georgia (country)) Mikheil Khutsishvili (2008–10)
- (North Macedonia) Blagoja Kitanovski (1990–91)
- (Uganda) Joseph Kizito (2004–10)
- (Serbia) Filip Knežević (2016–17)
- (Serbia) Aleksandar Kocić (1990–96)
- (Montenegro) Damir Kojašević (2017–18)
- (Serbia) Branislav Kojičić (1990–92)
- (Serbia) Kojić (1921)
- (Serbia) Stevan Komljenović (1979–81)
- (Montenegro) Boris Kopitović
- (Luxembourg) Seid Korać
- (Montenegro) Žarko Korać (2007–08)
- (Montenegro) Marko Kordić (2011–17)
- (Montenegro) Šaleta Kordić (2011–13, 15–16)
- (Slovenia) Leo Korošec (1932–34)
- (Serbia) Milorad Kosanović (1975–77, 79–80)
- (Serbia) Miloš Kosić (1926–33)
- (Montenegro) Nebojša Kosović (2010–14)
- (Montenegro) Vladan Kostić (2004–05)
- (Serbia) Dušan Kovačev (1914)
- (Serbia) Nikola Kovačević (2015–17)
- (Croatia) Rajko Kovačević (1970–74, 75–76)
- (Serbia) Vladimir Kovačević (2009–13, 16–17)
- (Serbia) Boško Kovrlija (2000–02)
- (Serbia) Milan Kovrlija (1969–71)
- (Serbia) Igor Kozoš (1997–98)
- (Serbia) Bojan Krasić (2005–06)
- (Serbia) Miloš Krasić (2000–04)
- (Serbia) Stanislav Krejić (1985–86)
- (Serbia) Mladen Krgin (1952–54)
- (Serbia) Radivoj Kričkov (1919–28)
- (Serbia) Radovan Krivokapić (1996–97, 98–02, 06–07)
- (Serbia) Slobodan Krivokapić (1968–71)
- (Serbia) Srboljub Krivokuća (1957–58)
- (Serbia) Krstić (1936–37)
- (Serbia) Dobrosav Krstić (1951–62)
- (Serbia) Radomir Krstić (1946–59)
- (Serbia) Velimir Krtolica (1973–74)
- (Serbia) Zoran Kuntić (1991–93)
- (Serbia) Stevan Kurcinak (1969–70)
- (Serbia) Ivan Kurtušić (2001–02)
- (North Macedonia) Dejan Kuskinski (1989–90)
- (Serbia) Miodrag Kustudić (1971–74)

== L ==
- (Montenegro) Risto Lakić (2008–10)
- (Serbia) Ivan Lakićević (2015–18)
- (Serbia) Adolf Lambi (1962–66)
- (Serbia) Pal Laslo (1968–70)
- (Serbia) Branko Lazarević (2002–05)
- (Bosnia and Herzegovina) Milan Lazarević (2015–18)
- (North Macedonia) Goran Lazarevski (2002–03)
- (Serbia) Nikola Lazetić (1997–98, 10–11)
- (Serbia) Žarko Lazetić (2008–09)
- (Serbia) Ognjen Lekić (2001–02)
- (Serbia) Nikola Leković (2013–14)
- (Serbia) Laslo Lerinc (1969–75, 76–78)
- (Serbia) Leo Lerinc (1995–99, 07–08)
- (Serbia) Ranko Leškov (1952–54)
- (Croatia) Slobodan Letica (1975–76)
- (Serbia) Janoš Licenberger (1982–83)
- (Serbia) Slavko Ličinar (1969–80)
- (Serbia) Emir Lotinac (2016–17)
- (Serbia) Darko Lovrić (2008–10)
- (Serbia) Vladan Lukić (1993–94)
- (Serbia) Luka Luković (2013–15)

== Lj ==
- (Serbia) Ljubinković (1926–28)
- (Serbia) Marko Ljubinković (2011–12)
- (Serbia) Jovan Ljubojević (1914–21)

== M ==
- (Serbia) Predrag Macanović (2000–01)
- (Bosnia and Herzegovina) Marinko Mačkić (2002–03)
- (Croatia) Davor Magoč (2003–05)
- (Croatia) Zlatko Majer (1978–80)
- (Serbia) Aleksandar Majtan II (1936–41)
- (Serbia) Mihajlo Majtan I (1932–39)
- (Serbia) Milan Makarić (2014–15)
- (Croatia) Edo Makiedo (1920–22)
- (Switzerland) Boban Maksimović (2008–09)
- (Serbia) Novica Maksimović (2015–17)
- (Serbia) Filip Malbašić (2015–18)
- (Serbia) Malenčić I (1919–24)
- (Serbia) Ilija Malenčić (1947–55)
- (Serbia) Rodoljub Malenčić II (1924–26)
- (Croatia) Vinko Malenica (1998–99)
- (Serbia) Luka Malešev (1956–59, 63–65)
- (Serbia) Predrag Malešev (1982–83, 84–86)
- (Serbia) Mladen Malić (1946–48)
- (Serbia) Danilo Mandić (1977–79)
- (Serbia) Dragan Mandić (2003–06)
- (Serbia) Marko Mandić (2017–18)
- (Serbia) Manojlović (1920)
- (Croatia) Čedo Maras (1987–90)
- (Argentina) Hernán Marcos (1998–99)
- (Serbia) Marić (1936)
- (Serbia) Savo Marić (1980–82)
- (Serbia) Slavko Marić (1978–79)
- (Serbia) Zoran Marić (1979–86, 87–88)
- (Serbia) Anđelko Marinković (1965–68)
- (Serbia) Marjanović (1925–27)
- (Serbia) Jovan Marjanović (1940–41, 46–49)
- (Serbia) Nikola Marjanović (1985–87)
- (Serbia) Božidar Marković-Boža (1932–33, 38–41)
- (Serbia) Dragan Marković (1987–89)
- (Serbia) Dušan Marković I -Sivonja (1921, 23–29, 34)
- (Serbia) Dušan Marković II -Luks (1926–34, 37–39)
- (Serbia) Miodrag Marković III (1931–33)
- (Serbia) Slobodan Marković (2006–07)
- (Russia) Martvey Martinkevich (2020–21)
- (Serbia) Vladimir Martinović (2001–02)
- (Cameroon) John Mary (2014–16)
- (Serbia) Mario Maslać (2016–17)
- (Serbia) Milan Maslić (2004–05)
- (Bosnia and Herzegovina) Adolf Mateović (1938–41)
- (Serbia) Matić (1937–38)
- (Serbia) Vladimir Matijašević (1997–99)
- (Serbia) Gustav Matković (1948–49)
- (Croatia) Ivan Medarić (1940–41)
- (Serbia) Momčilo Medić (1981–83)
- (Serbia) Slobodan Medojević (2006–12)
- (Serbia) Mario Međimorec (1983–84)
- (Serbia) Dejan Meleg (2015–17)
- (Georgia (country)) Giorgi Merebashvili (2009–12)
- (Serbia) Andraš Mesaroš (1981–85)
- (Serbia) Aleksandar Mesarović (2018–19)
- (Serbia) Zlatomir Mićanović (1979–83)
- (Serbia) Dušan Mićić (2015–17)
- (Serbia) Petar Mićin (2017–18)
- (Serbia) Čedomir Mićović (1977–85)
- (Serbia) Mihajlović (1925–26, 29–32)
- (Serbia) Siniša Mihajlović (1988–91)
- (Serbia) Stefan Mihajlović (2017–18)
- (Serbia) Stojan Mihajlović (1940–41, 46–49)
- (Serbia) Vesko Mihajlović (1991–93)
- (Croatia) Mihojević (1940–41)
- (Serbia) Zoran Mijanović (1992–98)
- (Serbia) Aleksandar Mijatović (2008–09)
- (Serbia) Petar Mijatović (1961–63)
- (Bosnia and Herzegovina) Dušan Mijić (1982–87, 88–91)
- (Serbia) Zoran Mijucić (1985–92)
- (Serbia) Miladinović (1937–39)
- (Serbia) Nemanja Miletić (2015–16)
- (Serbia) Miletin (1929–30)
- (Serbia) Đorđe Milić (1960–66)
- (Serbia) Ljubomir Milić (1964–65)
- (Serbia) Goran Milićević (1996–97)
- (Serbia) Milan Milinković (2015–16)
- (Serbia) Milorad Milićević (1914)
- (Serbia) Zoran Milinković (1990–91)
- (Serbia) Sergej Milinković-Savić (2012–14)
- (Serbia) Vanja Milinković-Savić (2014–15)
- (Greece) Nemanja Milojević (2018–19)
- (Serbia) Milojković (1924)
- (Serbia) Aleksandar Milojković (1971–72)
- (Serbia) Uroš Milosavljević (2005–06)
- (Serbia) Zoran Milosavljević (1988–90)
- (Serbia) Milošević (1931)
- (Serbia) Goran Milošević (1996–97)
- (North Macedonia) Sašo Miloševski (1995–98)
- (Serbia) Stevan Milovac (1986–90)
- (Serbia) Sima Milovanov (1946–57)
- (Serbia) Branko Milovanović (2003–05)
- (Serbia) Petar Milovanović (1968–69)
- (Serbia) Milovan Milović (2010–12)
- (Serbia) Milutinović (1936)
- (Serbia) Milutinović (1993–94)
- (Serbia) Milan Milutinović (2004–08)
- (Bosnia and Herzegovina) Miroslav Milutinović (2006–10)
- (Bosnia and Herzegovina) Nenad Miljković (1994–95, 96–97)
- (Serbia) Miošević (1937–38)
- (Serbia) Saša Mirjanić (1985–86)
- (Serbia) Milan Mirosavljev (2017–18)
- (Serbia) Zoran Mišić (1976–78)
- (Serbia) Slobodan Miškov (1938–40)
- (Serbia) Dejan Mitić (1980–81)
- (Serbia) Vuk Mitošević (2009–13)
- (Serbia) Mitrović (1926–28, 29–30)
- (Serbia) Mitrović (1940–41)
- Moga (1920)
- (North Macedonia) Daniel Mojsov (2010–13)
- (Serbia) Šandor Mokuš (1974–84, 85–86)
- Géza Molnár (1922)
- (Brazil) Leandro Montebeler (2008–09)
- (Guinea-Bissau) Almami Moreira (2011–13)
- (Serbia) Milorad Mrdak (1998–99)
- (Serbia) Miljan Mrdaković (2015–16)
- (Serbia) Dragan Mrđa (2008–10)
- (Bosnia and Herzegovina) Momčilo Mrkaić
- Mucha (1934)
- (Serbia) Vladimir Mudrinić (1996–00)
- (Serbia) Ognjen Mudrinski (2009–11)
- (Bosnia and Herzegovina) Enes Muhić (1988–89)
- (Bosnia and Herzegovina) Siniša Mulina (2000–01)
- Musin (1936)
- (Bosnia and Herzegovina) Kaplan Mustagrudić (1938–40)
- (Serbia) Milan Mutibarić (1952)

== N ==
- (Serbia) Šandor Nađ (1978–81)
- (Serbia) Mikloš Narančić (1982–83)
- (Bosnia and Herzegovina) Bojan Nastić (2012–16)
- (Serbia) Nenad Nastić (2005–08)
- (Serbia) Nedeljković (1934–36)
- (Serbia) Svetozar Nedeljković (1948–49)
- (Serbia) Pál Németh (1926–28, 29–40)
- (Serbia) Vladimir Nenadić (1992–93)
- (Serbia) Dušan Nenadić (1974–78)
- (Serbia) Uroš Nenadović (2013–14)
- (Serbia) Mihailo Nesković (2016–18)
- (Serbia) Stevan Nestički (1962–68)
- (Serbia) Dušan Nestorović (2009–13)
- (Serbia) Mihajlo Nešković (2016–18)
- (Serbia) Bojan Neziri (2000–03)
- (Serbia) Petar Nikezić (1967–80)
- (Serbia) Radoslav Nikodijević (1989–90)
- (Serbia) Joška Nikolić (1938–40, 46–47)
- (North Macedonia) Risto Nikolić/Nikolovski (1948–49)
- (Serbia) Slađan Nikolić (2002–03)
- (Bosnia and Herzegovina) Staniša Nikolić (2004–05)
- (Serbia) Stefan Nikolić (2013–15)
- (Serbia) Vladimir Nikolić (2000–01)
- (Serbia) Žarko Nikolić (1954–66, 68–69)
- (North Macedonia) Kiril Nikolovski (1969–70)
- (Serbia) Milutin Ninković (1952–53)
- (Serbia) Novaković (1932–33)
- (Serbia) Branislav Novaković (1977–82, 83–86)
- (Montenegro) Milko Novaković (2010–11, 14–16)
- (Bosnia and Herzegovina) Slobo Novaković (1997–98)
- (Serbia) Slobodan Novaković (2009–12, 14–15)
- (North Macedonia) Vlada Noveski
- (Serbia) Srđan Novković (2003–04)
- (Croatia) Martin Novoselac (1972–77)

== O ==
- (Serbia) Milovan Obradović (1985–86)
- (Serbia) Milorad Ognjanov (1923, 29–32, 1937–40)
- (Serbia) P. Ognjenović (1924–26)
- (Serbia) U. Ognjenović (1924–26)
- (Nigeria) Eze Vincent Okeuhie (2017–18)
- (Serbia) Lóránt Oláh (1999–00)
- (Serbia) Miroslav Opsenica (2006–07)
- (Cameroon) Aboubakar Oumarou (2010–13)
- Óvári (1921–22)
- (Serbia) Damir Ožegović (1994–96)
- (Serbia) Ognjen Ožegović (2015–16)

== P ==
- (Serbia) Filip Pajović (2010–11)
- (Serbia) Aleksandar Paločević (2015–17)
- (Serbia) Milan Panić (1946–49)
- (Serbia) Radovan Pankov (2013–16)
- (Serbia) Ilija Pantelić (1961–69)
- (Serbia) Miodrag Pantelić (1992–96)
- Papp (1923)
- (South Korea) Park In-hyeok (2017–18)
- (Serbia) Uroš Pašćan (1931–36)
- (Serbia) Bora Pašćan II (1936, 46–47)
- (Serbia) Slobodan Pašić (1977–78)
- (Serbia) Risto Pavić (1989–90)
- (Montenegro) Savo Pavićević (2007–08)
- (Serbia) Milan Pavkov (2015–16)
- (Serbia) Slobodan Pavković (1973–78)
- (Serbia) Đorđe Pavlić (1960–66)
- (Serbia) Borislav Pavlović (2004–06)
- (Serbia) Vladan Pavlović (2007–09, 10–13)
- (Croatia) Franjo Pazmanj (1946–48)
- (Hungary) Sándor Peics (1929–30)
- (Serbia) Dragoljub Pejović (1968–71)
- (Serbia) Labud Pejović (1979–84)
- (Serbia) Nino Pekarić (2004–07, 13–16)
- (Serbia) Miroslav Pekez (1990–91)
- (Serbia) Mitar Peković (2000–01, 08–10)
- (Montenegro) Dojčin Perazić (1971–74)
- (Serbia) Marko Perić (1974–76)
- (Serbia) Nikola Perić (2015–18)
- (Serbia) Marko Perović (1990–92, 93–94)
- (Bosnia and Herzegovina) Mustafa Peštalić (1982–83)
- (Serbia) Miloje Petković (1990–92)
- (Serbia) Nikola Petković (2005–07)
- (Serbia) Dobrosav Petrić (1946–49)
- (Serbia) Petrović (1922, 24–28)
- (Serbia) Aleksandar Petrović (1946–49)
- (Serbia) Božidar Petrović-Boško (1931–35)
- (Serbia) Milan Petrović (1979–81)
- (Serbia) Petrović (1938–39)
- (Serbia) Milorad Pilipović (1977–80)
- Béla Pintér (1936–38)
- (Slovenia) Josip Pirmajer (1968–72)
- Pirz (1919)
- (Serbia) Bogdan Planić (2016–18)
- (Bosnia and Herzegovina) Edvard Platz (1934, 38–40)
- (Brazil) Marcelo Pletsch (2009–11)
- (Serbia) Stevan Pletl (1946–47)
- (Slovakia) Ján Podhradský (1936)
- (Serbia) Mirko Poledica (2000–03)
- (Serbia) Marko Poletanović (2011–15)
- Policir (1921)
- (Bosnia and Herzegovina) Nikola Popara (2013–15)
- (Romania) Virgil Popescu (1938–41)
- (Serbia) Sava Popić (1981–85)
- (Serbia) Jugoslav Popov (1952–54)
- (Austria) Aleksandar Popović (2004–09)
- (Montenegro) Danilo Popović (1969–71)
- (Bosnia and Herzegovina) Goran Popović (1986–88)
- (Serbia) Ivan Popović (2003–05)
- (Serbia) Milan Popović (1982–83, 87–89)
- (Serbia) Nikola Popović (1925–32)
- (Serbia) Zoran Popović (2013–14)
- (Serbia) Zvonko Popović (1986–87)
- (Serbia) Potkonjak (1937–38)
- (Serbia) Zvonimir Požega (1938–41)
- (Serbia) Uroš Predić (1998–99)
- (Germany) Matthias Predojević (2001–02)
- (Serbia) Prodanović (1993–94)
- (Serbia) Petar Puača (1999–00)
- (Serbia) Antal Puhalak (1991–92)
- (Serbia) Dragan Punišić (1988–90)
- (Serbia) Miladin Purać (1974–78)
- (Serbia) Vasa Pušibrk (1962–69)
- (Serbia) Darko Puškarić (2013–17)
- (Serbia) Marko Putinčanin (2017–18)

== R ==
- (Serbia) Mihail Rac (1980–85)
- (Serbia) Željko Račić (1996–97)
- (Serbia) Miladin Radičević (1958–59)
- (Serbia) Radeta Radić (1972–73)
- (Serbia) Radovan Radivojević (1959–60)
- (Serbia) Nemanja Radoja (2011–14)
- (Montenegro) Dragan Radojičić (1994–96)
- (Serbia) Lazar Radojčić (1979–80)
- (Serbia) Radivoj Radosav (1961–72)
- (Serbia) Srđan Radosavljev (2007–08)
- (Serbia) Ivica Radosavljević (1976–79)
- (Serbia) Aleksandar Radovanović (2017–18)
- (Serbia) Dimitrije Radović (1959–63, 64–68)
- (Montenegro) Igor Radović (2006–07)
- (Montenegro) Ilija Radović (2007–08)
- (Montenegro) Miljan Radović (2000–03)
- (Bosnia and Herzegovina) Slaviša Radović (2014–16)
- (Montenegro) Andrija Radulović
- (Serbia) Milovan Rajevac (1979–80)
- (Serbia) Nenad Rajić (2002–04)
- (Serbia) Zdravko Rajkov (1951–62)
- (Serbia) Milenko Rajković (1929–37)
- (Serbia) Rajković II (1936–40)
- (Bosnia and Herzegovina) Zoran Rajović (1997–99, 00–02)
- (Serbia) Vladimir Rakić (1966–69)
- (Serbia) Đorđe Rapajić (1982–83)
- (Brazil) Renan (2017–18)
- (Serbia) Ristić (1937–40)
- (Serbia) Borivoje Ristić (2005–06)
- (Serbia) Dušan Ristić (1947–54)
- (Bosnia and Herzegovina) Ivan Ristić (1997–01)
- (Serbia) Pavle Ristić (1953–55)
- (Serbia) Emil Rockov (2016–18)
- (Serbia) Gojko Rodić (1968–70)
- (Serbia) Ivan Rogač (2014–15)
- (Serbia) Novak Roganović (1954–63)
- (Serbia) Vojislav Rogić (1938–40)
- (Serbia) Lazar Rosić (2015–16)
- (Serbia) Milan Rubin (1975–76, 77–78)
- Rus (1923)
- (Serbia) Vasa Rutonjski (1970–77, 78–80)

== S ==
- (Serbia) Manojlo Sabljar (1934)
- (Serbia) Zoltan Sabo (1992–96)
- (Serbia) Radoslav Samardžić (1990–92, 93–95)
- (Bosnia and Herzegovina) Dragan Samardžija (1981–82)
- (Serbia) Milorad Samardžija (1967–68)
- (Bosnia and Herzegovina) Siniša Saničanin (2017–18)
- (Romania) Marius Sasu (1997–98)
- (Serbia) Saulić (1920)
- (Serbia) Savić (1994–96)
- (Serbia) Saša Savić (2002–03)
- (Serbia) Vladimir Savić (1965–73)
- (Montenegro) Vukan Savićević
- (Croatia) Janko Savković (1963–64, 66–67)
- (Serbia) Ivan Savović (1946–53)
- (Hungary) Lajos Schönfeld "Tusko" (1921–22)
- (Montenegro) Milisav Sećković (1999–00)
- (Serbia) Milorad Sedmakov (1936–40)
- (Serbia) Stevan Sekereš (1958–67)
- (Serbia) Danilo Sekulić (2014–16)
- (Montenegro) Nemanja Sekulić (2012–13)
- (Serbia) Milorad Sekulović (1973–74)
- (Serbia) Sava Selena (1951–51, 53–57)
- (Serbia) Čedomir Sentin (1957–62, 63–65)
- (Kenya) Collins Sichenje
- (Serbia) Predrag Sikimić (2006–07)
- (Serbia) Vladimir Silađi (2010–11)
- (Serbia) Aleksandar Silber (1926–28, 29–32)
- (Serbia) Milan Simin (1936–41)
- (Serbia) Pera Simin (1940–41)
- (Bosnia and Herzegovina) Goran Skakić (1987–88)
- (Serbia) Slobodan Sladojević (1996–97)
- (Serbia) Jovan Slepčev (1953–57)
- (Serbia) Stevan Slivka (1954–55)
- (Serbia) Goran Smiljanić (2006–13)
- Franjo Sobčak (1946–47)
- (Serbia) Boris Sorgić (1997–98)
- (Indonesia) Ilija Spasojević (2004–05)
- (Serbia) Mirsad Sprečak (1982–84)
- (Serbia) Milan Spremo (2011–18)
- (Bosnia and Herzegovina) Tihomir Srdanović (1975–76)
- (Serbia) Ljubomir Srđanov (1951)
- (Serbia) Srećkov (1926–29)
- (Serbia) Branko Srećkov (1936–39)
- (Serbia) Bata Srećković (1948–49)
- (Montenegro) Milan Sredanović (1968–69)
- (Uganda) Eugene Sseppuya (2007–09)
- (Serbia) Dušan Stakić (1975–77, 83–85)
- (Serbia) Uroš Stamenić (2013–17)
- (Serbia) Goran Stamenković (2002–03)
- (North Macedonia) Tonče Stamevski (1964–70, 71–72)
- (Montenegro) Milan Stanić (1966–68, 69–71)
- (Serbia) Aleksandar Stanisavljević (2015–16)
- (Serbia) Petar Stanivukov (1931–33)
- (Serbia) Mića Starčević (1938–40)
- (Serbia) Stefanović (1921)
- (Serbia) Ljubiša Stefanović (1960–62)
- (Serbia) Milan Stepanov (2000–06, 15–16)
- (Bosnia and Herzegovina) Miroslav Stevanović (2010–13)
- (Montenegro) Slaven Stjepanović (2008–10)
- (Romania) Alin Stoica (2009–10)
- (Serbia) Milan Stoja (1938–40)
- (Serbia) Damir Stojak (1993–94, 96–97)
- (Serbia) Marinko Stojaković (1986–87)
- (Serbia) Aleksandar Stojanović (1985–86)
- (Serbia) Jovan Stojanović (2013–15)
- (Serbia) Nenad Stojanović (2008–09)
- (Serbia) Ozren Stojanović (1914)
- (Serbia) Predrag Stojanović (1914–22)
- (Serbia) Miloš Stojčev (2007–08)
- (Serbia) Goran Stojiljković (1998–99)
- (Serbia) Aleksandar Stojković (1946–47)
- (Serbia) Aranđel Stojković (2018–19)
- (Serbia) Miodrag Stošić (2005–09)
- (Serbia) Nemanja Subotić (2017–18)
- (Bosnia and Herzegovina) Nemanja Supić (2011–13)
- (Serbia) Dragan Surdučki (1963–66)
- (Serbia) Surlić (1937–39)
- (Serbia) Suvajdžić (1920)
- (Serbia) Ratko Svilar (1973–80)
- (Serbia) Slavko Svinjarević (1955–57, 58–65)
- (Serbia) Nikola Svirčević (1936, 38–39)
- (Hungary) Sándor Szluha (1940–41)

== Š ==
- (Serbia) Svetozar Šapurić (1985–89)
- (Bosnia and Herzegovina) Zoran Šaraba (1990–92, 93–98)
- (Serbia) Dragan Šarac (2007–08)
- (Serbia) Aleksandar Šarčev (1936–39)
- (Bosnia and Herzegovina) Admir Šarčević (1989–90)
- (Serbia) Jovan Šarčević (1991–94)
- Šasbek (1924)
- (Serbia) Goran Šaula (1990–96)
- (Montenegro) Nebojša Šćepanović (1994–96)
- (Serbia) Andrija Šebek (1923, 25–26)
- (Serbia) Silvester Šereš (1951–53)
- (Bosnia and Herzegovina) Miloš Šestić (1986–90)
- (Serbia) Šević (1921–27, 28–29)
- (Serbia) Šijačić (1926–31, 36–38)
- (Serbia) Sava Šijakov (1914–19)
- (Serbia) Dragan Šipka (1978–80)
- (Serbia) Petar Škorić (1985–86, 87–88, 89–90, 91–92)
- (Serbia) Petar Škuletić (2011–14)
- Šlezinger (1922)
- (Montenegro) Bojan Šljivančanin (2003–05)
- Šolc (1920–21)
- (Serbia) Emil Šosberger (1937–41)
- (Serbia) Stojan Šovljanski (1932–33, 36–37)
- Špis (1923)
- (Serbia) Dušan Šućov (1930–38)
- (Serbia) Slobodan Šujica (1980–81)
- (Serbia) Šustrijan (1926–28)
- (Australia) Milan Šušak (2002–07)
- (Montenegro) Darko Šuškavčević (1998–00)
- (Montenegro) Đorđe Šušnjar (2009–13)
- (Serbia) Radonja Šutović (1957–58)

== T ==
- (Serbia) Dušan Tadić (2006–10)
- (Serbia) Slobodan Tadijin (1962–63)
- (Serbia) Silvester Takač (1958–67)
- (Montenegro) Jovan Tanasijević (1997–03)
- (Croatia) Miroslav Tanjga (1988–91)
- (Serbia) Tatović (1936)
- (Bosnia and Herzegovina) Dobrica Tegeltija (2016–17)
- (Bosnia and Herzegovina) Amir Teljigović (1992–94)
- (Serbia) Mirko Tintar (1982–87)
- (Serbia) Luka Titov (1977–78)
- (Serbia) Saša Todić (2000–06)
- (Serbia) Todorović (1920)
- (Serbia) Dragan Todorović (1975–76, 77–80, 81–82, 84–85)
- (Serbia) Vladimir Toković (1985–88)
- (Serbia) Tomin (1934)
- (North Macedonia) Borislav Tomovski (1990–91)
- (Serbia) Nebojša Topalov (2002–03)
- (Serbia) Dimitrije Torbarov (1952–53)
- (Serbia) Branislav Trajković (2010–14)
- (Serbia) Nikola Trajković (2001–04)
- (Mali) Mamadou Traoré
- (Serbia) Dane Trbović (2003–05)
- (Serbia) Trifunović (1940–41)
- (Serbia) Miloš Trifunović (2016–17)
- (Serbia) Vladimir Trifunović (1973–76, 77–81)
- (Serbia) Milan Trišić (1977–78)
- (Serbia) Dobrivoje Trivić (1965–71, 74–75)
- (Serbia) Gojko Trivić (1989–93)
- (Serbia) Miloš Trivunović (2016–17)
- (Serbia) Veseljko Trivunović (2007–09)
- (Serbia) Jovan Trnić (1978–80)
- (Serbia) Nikola Trujić (2015–18)
- (Montenegro) Janko Tumbasević (2007–11, 13–15)

== U ==
- (Serbia) Vojo Ubiparip (2006–07)

== V ==
- Valent (1922–23)
- (Serbia) Nenad Vanić (1997–98)
- (Bosnia and Herzegovina) Dragan Vasić (1982–87, 88–89)
- (Serbia) Lazar Vasić (1946–59)
- (Serbia) Sreten Vasić (1997–03)
- (Serbia) Jovica Vasilić (2015–16)
- (Serbia) Boris Vasković (1996–00)
- (Serbia) Smajo Vesnić (1982–83)
- (Serbia) Živorad Veličković (1946–49)
- (Serbia) Jožef Velker (1936–41, 46–51)
- (Serbia) Branislav Veljković (1965–68)
- (Serbia) Andraš Vereš (1952, 56–63)
- (Croatia) Josip Verner (1963–64)
- (Serbia) Lazar Veselinović (2013–16)
- (Serbia) Ranko Veselinović (2017–18)
- (Serbia) Todor Veselinović (1948–51, 53–61)
- (Serbia) Lajoš Viček (1962–64)
- (Serbia) Svetislav Vilovski (1932–33)
- (Serbia) Žarko Vinčić (1947–49)
- (Russia) Sergei Vitvinskiy (1923)
- (Serbia) Milan Vještica (2001–02)
- (Serbia) Zoran Vještica (1976–77)
- (Serbia) Vladimirović (1926–29)
- (Serbia) Aleksandar Vlahović (1984–88)
- (Serbia) Branislav Vlajić (1968–69)
- (Serbia) Svetozar Vlaović (1947–48, 52–54)
- (Serbia) Stevan Vodalov (1957–58)
- (Montenegro) Ivan Vojvodić (2003–04)
- (Serbia) Ljubomir Vorkapić (1986–91)
- (Serbia) Mićo Vranješ (1995–00)
- (Bosnia and Herzegovina) Stojan Vranješ (2012–14)
- (Serbia) Mile Vrga (1977–78, 83–87)
- (Montenegro) Slobodan Vučeković (1970–71, 73–79)
- (Bosnia and Herzegovina) Mladen Vučinić (1956–69)
- (Serbia) Nebojša Vučković (1974–77)
- (Serbia) Petar Vučurević (1946–48)
- (Montenegro) Budimir Vujačić (1987–89)
- (Montenegro) Igor Vujačić (2012–14)
- (Montenegro) Rajko Vujadinović (1978–84)
- (Montenegro) Luka Vujanović (2017–18)
- (Serbia) Đorđe Vujkov (1973–83)
- (Montenegro) Darko Vujović (1990–92)
- (Montenegro) Predrag Vujović (2006–07)
- (Serbia) Dejan Vukadinović (2003–04)
- (Serbia) Milorad Vukadinović (1985–87)
- (Serbia) Vladimir Vukajlović (2007–09)
- (Montenegro) Marko Vukasović (2016–18)
- (Serbia) Miroslav Vukašinović (1971–77)
- (Montenegro) Ivan Vukčević
- (Montenegro) Marko Vukčević (2015–16)
- (Montenegro) Simon Vukčević (2013–14)
- (Serbia) Milan Vukelić (1955–57)
- (Serbia) Ljubiša Vukelja (2000–06, 07–08)
- (Bosnia and Herzegovina) Goran Vukliš
- (Serbia) Dragomir Vukobratović (2004–08)
- (Serbia) Nikola Vukoslavčević (1989–90)
- (Montenegro) Miodrag Vukotić (1994–95)
- (Serbia) Ivica Vukov (1985–86, 87–88, 89–93)
- (Serbia) Jagoš Vuković (2013–14)
- (Serbia) Dragan Vulević (1997–98)
- (Serbia) Miroslav Vulićević (2009–14)

== W ==
- (Hungary) Sándor Weisz (1923–27, 28–29)

== Z ==
- (Ivory Coast) Caleb Zady Sery
- (Serbia) Đorđe Zafirović (2002–03)
- (Serbia) Boro Zagorac (2000–01)
- (Serbia) Jovan Zagorac (1929–32, 33–39)
- (Serbia) Nenad Zečević (1998–99)
- (Serbia) Saša Zečević (2004–06)
- (Croatia) Josip Zemko (1966–72)
- (Serbia) Čedomir Zeremski (1919)
- (Serbia) Ilija Zinaić (2002–03)
- (Serbia) Vukoje Zirojević (1989–90)
- (Serbia) Lazar Zličić (2015–17)
- (Serbia) Miloš Zličić (2016–18)
- (Bosnia and Herzegovina) Damir Zlomislić (2018–19)
- (Croatia) Radoslav Zlopaša (1959–61)
- (Serbia) Marko Zoćević (2015–16)
- (Serbia) Vladislav Zorić (1971–72)
- (Bosnia and Herzegovina) Marijan Zovko (1980–89)
- (Slovakia) Milan Zvarík (1985–86)

== Ž ==
- (Serbia) Srđan Žakula (2012–13)
- (Serbia) Milan Žikić (1928–34)
- (Serbia) Dragan Žilić (1996–00)
- (Serbia) Đorđe Živić (1923–34)
- (Serbia) Živić II (1928–30, 36–38)
- (Serbia) Bratislav Živković (1990–91, 92–94)
- (Serbia) Dragić Živković (1946–57)
- (Serbia) Kristijan Živković (2017–18)
- (Serbia) Lazar Živković (1940–41, 46–48)
- (Serbia) Marko Živković (2013–14)
- (Serbia) Miroslav Živković (1990–92)
- (Serbia) Dragiša Žunić (2003–04)

== Players without official appearances ==
- (Ghana) Francis Afriyie (2016–17)
- (Lebanon) Raja Asfour (2021-22)
- (Switzerland) Milan Basrak (2011–12)
- (Brazil) Jefferson Batista (2008–09)
- (Serbia) Đorđe Brborić (2017–18)
- (Greece) Giannis Charontakis (2016–17)
- (United States) Mark Conrad (2007–08)
- (Croatia) Goran Dasović (1995–96)
- (Serbia) Lazar Dimitrijević (2017–18)
- (Denmark) Adda Djeziri (2017–18)
- (Bosnia and Herzegovina) Dušan Drašković (1959–60)
- (Bosnia and Herzegovina) Darko Đajić (2009–10)
- (Serbia) Dejan Đurić (2017–18)
- (Sweden) Frederick Enaholo (1991–92)
- (East Germany) Christian Engelmann (198?–8?)
- (Croatia) Nikola Gavrić (2013–14)
- (Croatia) Aleksandar Glamočak (2000–02)
- (Serbia) Miljan Ivan (2017–18)
- (Serbia) Andrej Jakovljević (2017–18)
- (Montenegro) Božidar Janjušević (2012–13)
- (Serbia) Igor Jeličić (2017–18)
- (Bosnia and Herzegovina) Darko Jović (2017–18)
- (Montenegro) Luka Klikovac (2014–15)
- (Serbia) Đorđe Knežević (2017–18)
- (Georgia (country)) Davit Kokhia (2014–15)
- (North Macedonia) Strahinja Krstevski (2015–16)
- (Bosnia and Herzegovina) Bojan Magazin (1998–99)
- (Slovenia) Vladimir Mandić (2005–06)
- (Bosnia and Herzegovina) Dragan Matković (2017–18)
- (Serbia) Milutin Miletić (2017–18)
- (Serbia) Miloš Milijašević (2017–18)
- (Serbia) Danilo Mitrović (2017–18)
- (Romania) Teodor Mogin (1924–25)
- (North Macedonia) Filip Naumčevski (2010–11)
- (Nigeria) Cyril Nebo (2020–21)
- (Serbia) Siniša Nijemčević (2017–18)
- (Sweden) Niclas Nyhlén (1984–85)
- (Canada) Mario Ostojić (1991–93)
- (Argentina) Pablo Ostrowski (2007–09)
- (Brazil) Patrick
- (Serbia) Vukašin Pilipović (2017–18)
- (Serbia) Ranko Puškić (2017–18)
- (Bosnia and Herzegovina) Zvonimir Rašić (1956–57)
- (Croatia) Hrvoje Rizvanović (2017–18)
- (Serbia) Dragoljub Savić (2017–18)
- (Bosnia and Herzegovina) Miljan Sekulović (1991–92)
- (Serbia) Aleksandar Siljanovski (2017–18)
- (Russia) Nikolai Simeonov (1923–24)
- (Serbia) Luka Sinđić (2017–18)
- (Slovenia) Filip Starič (2018–19)
- (Hungary) Tibor Szabó (199?–9?)
- (Bosnia and Herzegovina) Stefan Šavija (2017–18)
- (Serbia) Mirko Topić (2017–18)
- (Serbia) Nemanja Toroman (2017–18)
- (Serbia) Nikola Vasiljev (2017–18)
- (Croatia) Ivica Vrdoljak (1990–99)
- (Australia) Goran Zarić (1996–98)
- (Bosnia and Herzegovina) Almedin Ziljkić (2014–15)
- (Montenegro) Stefan Zogović (2009–16)
- (Serbia) Dejan Zukić (2017–18)

== See also ==
- List of FK Partizan players
- List of Red Star Belgrade footballers

== Notes ==
It is possible that some players are missing. The players of the seasons 1934–35, 1945–46 and 1949–50 are missing.

The players that played during Yugoslav period have represented the flag that would correspond to the current countries, that were the correspondent Yugoslav republics back then.

== External sources ==
- All-seasons results with players at fkvojvodina.com
- 1932/1933 season at exyufudbal.in.rs
- Tempo almanah 1991/1992 page 10
- FK Vojvodina almanah 2000/2001
- FK Vojvodina almanah 2002/2003
