= Šarčević =

Šarčević (Serbian Cyrillic: Шарчевић) is a surname found in Serbia, Bosnia and Croatia. Notable people with the surname include:

- Admir Šarčević (born 1967), Bosnian-Herzegovinian football player
- Antoni Sarcevic (born 1992), English football player
- Bojan Šarčević (born 1974), Bosnian-French visual artist
- Igor Šarčević (born 1984), Serbian decathlete and bobsledder
- Ina Šarčević (born 1959), Yugoslav-American astrophysicist
- Jovan Šarčević (1966–2015), Serbian football player
- Mladen Šarčević (born 1957), Serbian politician
- Nemanja Šarčević (born 1984), Serbian politician
- Nikola Šarčević (born 1974), Swedish punk rock musician
- Petar A. Šarčević, Croatian diplomat
- Ray Sarcevic (born 1964), Australian rules footballer
