= Dárdai =

Dárdai is a surname. Notable people with the surname include:

- Bence Dárdai (born 2006), Hungarian football midfielder
- Márton Dárdai (born 2002), Hungarian football defender
- Pál Dárdai (born 1976), Hungarian football midfielder and manager
- Pál Dárdai (footballer, born 1951) (1951–2017), Hungarian football midfielder and manager
- Palkó Dárdai (born 1999), Hungarian football winger
