= Milan Zvarík =

Czechoslovak footballer (born 1951)

Personal information
- Full name: Milan Zvarík
- Date of birth: 23 November 1951 (age 74)
- Place of birth: Czechoslovakia
- Position: Defender

Youth career
- Jednota Bánová

Senior career*
Years	Team	Apps	(Gls)
1973–1982	Spartak Trnava	?	(6)
1982–1985	MŠK Žilina	119	(6)
1985–1986	FK Vojvodina	3	(0)

International career
1973–1974	Czechoslovakia U-23	3	(0)
- * Club domestic league appearances and goals

Milan Zvarík (born 23 November 1951) is a former Czechoslovak football player.

Playing as central defender, after playing with local team TJ Jednota Bánová, he represented Spartak Trnava and Žilina in the Czechoslovak First League.

In 1985, along with Hungarian duo János Borsó and Pál Dárdai, they were the foreign signings of FK Vojvodina for that season, still playing in the former Yugoslav First League.

At national team level, he played a total of 3 matches for the Czechoslovak U-23 team.

== External sources ==
- Český a československý fotbal: lexikon osobností a klubů : 1906–2006 at Google Books.
- Stats for Yugoslav Leagues at Zerodic.
