= FC Farul Constanța in European football =

Statistics of FC Farul Constanța in European football competitions

FC Farul Constanța, now FCV Farul Constanța after the merger with FC Viitorul Constanța, is a Romanian football club which currently plays in Liga I.

== Total statistics ==
Competition	S	P	W	D	L	GF	GA	GD
UEFA Champions League	1	2	1	0	1	1	3	-2
UEFA Europa Conference League	1	6	5	0	1	13	7	+6
UEFA Intertoto Cup	2	11	6	3	2	15	14	+1
Total	4	19	12	3	4	29	24	+5

== Statistics by country ==
Country	Club	P	W	D	L	GF	GA	GD
Armenia	FC Urartu	2	2	0	0	6	4	+2
Subtotal		2	2	0	0	6	4	+2
Belarus	FC Dnepr Mogilev	1	1	0	0	2	0	+2
Subtotal		1	1	0	0	2	0	+2
Bulgaria	PFC Lokomotiv Plovdiv	2	1	1	0	3	2	+1
Subtotal		2	1	1	0	3	2	+1
Estonia	FC Flora	2	2	0	0	5	0	+5
Finland	Helsingin Jalkapalloklubi	2	1	0	1	2	3	-1
Subtotal		2	1	0	1	2	3	-1
France	AJ Auxerre	2	1	0	1	2	4	–2
France	AS Cannes	1	0	1	0	0	0	0
Subtotal		3	1	1	1	2	4	–2
Moldova	FC Sheriff Tiraspol	2	1	0	1	1	3	-2
Subtotal		2	1	0	1	1	3	-2
Netherlands	SC Heerenveen	1	0	0	1	0	4	–4
Subtotal		1	0	0	1	0	4	–4
Poland	Pogoń Szczecin	1	1	0	0	2	1	+1
Subtotal		1	1	0	0	2	1	+1
(North Macedonia) Republic of Macedonia	FK Pobeda	2	1	1	0	4	2	+2
Subtotal		2	1	1	0	4	2	+2
Serbia / Serbia and Montenegro	FK Bečej	1	1	0	0	2	1	+1
Subtotal		1	1	0	0	2	1	+1
Total		19	12	3	4	29	24	+5

== Statistics by competition ==
Notes for the abbreviations in the table below:

- 1R: First round
- 2R: Second round
- 3R: Third round
- R16: Round of 16
- 1QR: First qualifying round
- 2QR: Second qualifying round
- 3QR: Third qualifying round
- PO: Play-off round

Season	Competition	Round	Country	Club	Home	Away	Aggregate
1995	UEFA Intertoto Cup	Group stage (8)	Serbia and Montenegro	Bečej	—N/a	2–1	1st place
1995	UEFA Intertoto Cup	Group stage (8)	Poland	Pogoń Szczecin	2–1	—N/a	1st place
1995	UEFA Intertoto Cup	Group stage (8)	France	Cannes	—N/a	0–0	1st place
1995	UEFA Intertoto Cup	Group stage (8)	Belarus	Dnepr	2–0	—N/a	1st place
1995	UEFA Intertoto Cup	R16	Netherlands	Heerenveen	—N/a	0–4	0–4
2006	UEFA Intertoto Cup	1R	(North Macedonia) Republic of Macedonia	FK Pobeda	2–0	2–2	4–2
2006	UEFA Intertoto Cup	2R	Bulgaria	PFC Lokomotiv Plovdiv	2–1	1–1	3–2
2006	UEFA Intertoto Cup	3R	France	AJ Auxerre	1–0	1–4	2–4
2023–24	UEFA Champions League	1QR	Moldova	Sheriff Tiraspol	1–0	0–3 (a.e.t.)	1–3
2023–24	UEFA Conference League	2QR	Armenia	Urartu	3–2	3–2	6–4
2023–24	UEFA Conference League	3QR	Estonia	Flora	3–0	2–0	5–0
2023–24	UEFA Conference League	PO	Finland	HJK Helsinki	2-1	0–2	2–3
