= Muhić =

Muhić is a Croatian and Bosniak surname. Notable people with the surname include:

- Enes Muhić (born 1961), Bosnian footballer
- Ferid Muhić (born 1944), Bosniak philosopher
- Pavao Muhić (1811–1897), Croatian lawyer and politician
