= 1988–89 Yugoslav First League =

Prva savezna liga Jugoslavije
- Season: 1988–89
- Dates: 6 August 1988 – 4 June 1989
- Champions: Vojvodina (2nd title)
- Relegated: Napredak Kruševac (17th); Čelik Zenica (18th)
- European Cup: Vojvodina
- Cup Winners' Cup: Partizan
- UEFA Cup: Red Star; Rad; Dinamo Zagreb
- Top goalscorer: Davor Šuker (33)

The 1988–89 Yugoslav First League season was the 43rd season of the First Federal League (Serbo-Croatian: Prva savezna liga), the top level association football competition of SFR Yugoslavia, since its establishment in 1946.

The season began on 6 August 1988 with its fall part completing on 18 December 1988. Following a two-month winter break, the season resumed on 26 February 1989 and ran until 4 June 1989.

== New rule: "Šajber's penalties" ==
The season saw the introduction of a new way of awarding points when a league match ends in a draw. Two points were still being awarded for a win, while in case of a draw at the end of the ninety minutes — penalty kicks were taken and the shootout winner was awarded one point while the loser got nothing. The 1988–89 season was the very first to feature this tie-break method, and the Yugoslav FA's decision to implement it caused a lot of criticism and controversy. The biggest proponent of the new rule was the Yugoslav FA (FSJ) president Slavko Šajber and it was often derisively referred to in the media as 'Šajber's penalties'.

== League table ==
Pos	Team	Pld	W	PKW	PKL	L	GF	GA	GD	Pts	Qualification or relegation
1	Vojvodina (C)	34	18	5	1	10	50	38	+12	41	Qualification for European Cup first round
2	Red Star Belgrade	34	18	2	5	9	55	30	+25	38	Qualification for UEFA Cup first round
3	Hajduk Split	34	15	6	4	9	50	29	+21	36	Banned from European competition (Note: In November 1987, UEFA banned Hajduk Split from European competitions for two seasons. The immediate catalyst for the punishment was crowd trouble during the club's 1987–88 European Cup Winners' Cup second round return leg at home against Marseille on 5 November 1987. However, repeated prior incidents at Hajduk's European home matches throughout early-to-mid 1980s (such as the 1983–84 UEFA Cup semifinal first leg infamous 'rooster incident' against Tottenham Hotspur) also contributed to the decision. Since Hajduk's 1987-88 Yugoslav League performance failed to qualify the club for 1988-89 European competition, the punishment was enacted for seasons when Hajduk did manage to qualify: 1989-90 and 1990-91.)
4	Rad	34	13	9	2	10	46	38	+8	35	Qualification for UEFA Cup first round
5	Dinamo Zagreb	34	16	2	7	9	42	29	+13	34	Qualification for UEFA Cup first round
6	Partizan	34	15	3	4	12	52	37	+15	33	Qualification for Cup Winners' Cup first round
7	Radnički Niš	34	14	3	4	13	42	35	+7	31	
8	Osijek	34	13	5	2	14	49	50	−1	31	
9	Vardar	34	13	3	4	14	46	51	−5	29	
10	Rijeka	34	14	0	7	13	35	34	+1	28	
11	Velež	34	13	2	2	17	42	43	−1	28	
12	Sloboda Tuzla	34	11	6	6	11	35	42	−7	28	
13	Sarajevo	34	11	6	4	13	35	42	−7	28	
14	Budućnost	34	12	4	3	15	32	43	−11	28	
15	Spartak Subotica	34	11	4	3	16	30	39	−9	26	
16	Željezničar	34	12	1	3	18	34	49	−15	25	
17	Napredak Kruševac (R)	34	11	1	4	18	42	59	−17	23	Relegation to Yugoslav Second League
18	Čelik (Note: Čelik were docked 6 points.) (R)	34	9	5	2	18	31	60	−29	17	Relegation to Yugoslav Second League

Source: rsssf.org
Rules for classification: 1) points; 2) goal difference; 3) number of goals scored.
(C) Champion; (R) Relegated

== Results ==
Results in brackets indicate the results from penalty shoot-outs whenever games were drawn.

Home \ Away	BUD	ČEL	DIN	HAJ	NAP	OSI	PAR	RAD	RNI	RSB	RIJ	SAR	SLO	SPA	VAR	VEL	VOJ	ŽEL
Budućnost		1–0	0–0^{(3–1)}	2–1	2–1	1–0	0–0^{[4–2)}	3–0	1–0	2–0	1–0	2–0	1–2	1–1^{(5–6)}	1–1^{(5–6)}	0–0^{(6–5)}	1–0	1–0
Čelik	0–0^{(3–1)}		0–0^{(2–4)}	1–0	2–1	1–1^{(2–4)}	1–4	1–1^{(5–4)}	2–1	2–1	0–1	2–0	1–2	0–1	1–1^{(4–2)}	1–1^{(4–2)}	3–1	1–0
Dinamo Zagreb	2–0	0–2		1–0	4–0	1–3	2–0	0–0^{(4–5)}	2–1	1–0	2–0	3–0	2–0	0–0^{(4–3)}	2–0	3–0	1–1^{(1–3)}	3–1
Hajduk Split	2–1	2–0	4–1		5–0	0–1	2–2^{(0–2)}	2–2^{(4–5)}	3–0	0–0^{(4–2)}	4–0	3–1	1–0	1–0	4–1	4–0	0–0^{(2–4)}	2–0
Napredak Kruševac	3–1	3–0	0–0^{(7–6)}	1–1^{(1–3)}		2–0	4–2	2–0	4–3	1–0	0–1	4–0	0–1	2–1	1–1^{(4–5)}	1–0	1–2	3–0
Osijek	2–2^{(5–4)}	6–2	0–2	2–1	4–0		2–1	1–1^{(3–1)}	0–0^{(4–3)}	1–3	1–3	0–3	3–1	3–1	1–0	3–0	3–1	4–1
Partizan	3–0	2–2^{(10–11)}	2–0	1–0	4–2	1–1^{(3–5)}		3–1	1–0	1–0	1–0	6–1	0–1	1–1^{(2–3)}	0–1	1–0	4–1	4–0
Rad	3–1	3–0	1–2	0–1	2–1	3–1	0–2		1–0	0–0^{(4–3)}	4–0	0–2	2–2^{(4–1)}	4–0	3–0	3–1	1–1^{(3–2)}	2–1
Radnički Niš	2–1	2–0	1–1^{(3–2)}	0–0^{(4–5)}	2–1	4–2	3–1	0–0^{(2–3)}		0–1	1–0	1–0	3–0	1–0	3–1	1–0	2–1	4–0
Red Star	2–1	4–1	3–1	3–0	4–0	2–1	3–1	1–0	2–2^{(4–5)}		5–1	3–1	2–0	2–0	0–0^{(3–4)}	4–1	3–1	1–0
Rijeka	0–1	2–1	1–0	0–0^{(1–3)}	4–1	2–0	1–1^{(3–4)}	0–1	0–0^{(4–5)}	1–2		0–0^{(2–3)}	1–0	0–0^{(5–6)}	3–0	2–1	2–1	3–0
Sarajevo	4–1	3–0	2–1	0–1	1–1^{(4–2)}	0–0^{(4–3)}	0–0^{(4–5)}	0–0^{(1–4)}	2–0	1–1^{(1–4)}	1–2		1–1^{(4–2)}	1–0	1–0	1–0	0–0^{(1–2)}	2–0
Sloboda Tuzla	2–1	2–0	0–0^{(4–3)}	3–1	1–0	1–1^{(5–3)}	1–0	1–2	2–2^{(5–3)}	1–1^{(1–4)}	0–0^{(5–4)}	0–0^{(4–5)}		0–0^{(3–5)}	2–0	2–4	1–1^{(3–0)}	1–0
Spartak Subotica	2–0	2–1	1–2	0–1	1–0	0–1	2–0	2–2^{(1–3)}	1–3	1–0	1–0	4–2	1–1^{(3–2)}		1–0	1–0	0–1	2–1
Vardar	2–1	6–1	0–1	1–1^{(3–5)}	1–1^{(4–3)}	2–0	1–0	1–4	1–0	3–1	3–2	2–2^{(2–4)}	3–0 (Note: Match awarded 3–0 to Vardar.)	2–0		3–2	2–1	5–1
Velež	2–1	3–0	1–1^{(4–3)}	2–2^{(5–4)}	2–0	4–0	0–1	3–0	3–0	1–0	0–3	1–0	2–0	2–1	5–1		0–1	0–1
Vojvodina	2–0	2–0	4–1	2–0	3–1	2–1	3–2	3–0	1–0	3–1	0–0^{(4–3)}	1–2	4–2	2–1	2–0	1–0		1–0
Željezničar	4–1	1–2	1–0	1–1^{(5–6)}	4–0	2–0	1–0	0–0^{(2–4)}	1–0	0–0^{(4–3)}	1–0	2–1	2–2^{(1–4)}	2–1	3–1	0–1	3–0	

Source: DataSoccer.it
Legend: Blue = home team win; Yellow = draw; Red = away team win.

== Winning squad ==
Champions: FK Vojvodina
Player	League	
Player	Matches	Goals
(Socialist Federal Republic of Yugoslavia) Čedo Maras (goalkeeper)	34	0
(Socialist Federal Republic of Yugoslavia) Budimir Vujačić	31	7
(Socialist Federal Republic of Yugoslavia) Siniša Mihajlović	31	4
(Socialist Federal Republic of Yugoslavia) Miloš Šestić	30	7
(Socialist Federal Republic of Yugoslavia) Goran Kartalija	28	1
(Socialist Federal Republic of Yugoslavia) Dušan Mijić	28	1
(Socialist Federal Republic of Yugoslavia) Svetozar Šapurić	28	1
(Socialist Federal Republic of Yugoslavia) Stevan Milovac	26	2
(Socialist Federal Republic of Yugoslavia) Ljubomir Vorkapić	25	6
(Socialist Federal Republic of Yugoslavia) Dragan Punišić	25	4
(Socialist Federal Republic of Yugoslavia) Slaviša Jokanović	24	4
(Socialist Federal Republic of Yugoslavia) Dejan Joksimović	23	5
(Socialist Federal Republic of Yugoslavia) Milan Popović	20	1
(Socialist Federal Republic of Yugoslavia) Zoran Mijucić	19	4
(Socialist Federal Republic of Yugoslavia) Željko Dakić	15	2
(Socialist Federal Republic of Yugoslavia) Dragan Gaćeša	15	0
(Socialist Federal Republic of Yugoslavia) Miroslav Tanjga	14	1
(Socialist Federal Republic of Yugoslavia) Dragan Marković	7	0
(Socialist Federal Republic of Yugoslavia) Zoran Milosavljević	6	0
(Socialist Federal Republic of Yugoslavia) Enes Muhić	4	0
(Socialist Federal Republic of Yugoslavia) Marijan Zovko	4	0
(Socialist Federal Republic of Yugoslavia) Jovo Bosančić	2	0
(Socialist Federal Republic of Yugoslavia) Zoran Hajdić	1	0
(Socialist Federal Republic of Yugoslavia) Dragan Vasić (goalkeeper)	1	0
Head coach: Ljupko Petrović

== Top scorers ==
Rank	Player	Club	Goals
1	(Socialist Federal Republic of Yugoslavia) Davor Šuker	Osijek	18
2	(Socialist Federal Republic of Yugoslavia) Mladen Mladenović	Rijeka	13
3	(Socialist Federal Republic of Yugoslavia) Semir Tuce	Velež	12
3	(Socialist Federal Republic of Yugoslavia) Dušan Arsenijević	Rad	12
3	(Socialist Federal Republic of Yugoslavia) Dragan Stojković	Red Star	12
6	(Socialist Federal Republic of Yugoslavia) Anto Drobnjak	Budućnost	10
6	(Socialist Federal Republic of Yugoslavia) Dejan Lukić	Radnički Niš	10
6	(Socialist Federal Republic of Yugoslavia) Mirko Mihić	Sloboda Tuzla	10
6	(Socialist Federal Republic of Yugoslavia) Vasil Gunev	Napredak Kruševac	10
10	(Socialist Federal Republic of Yugoslavia) Branko Karačić	Hajduk Split	9
10	(Socialist Federal Republic of Yugoslavia) Vladimir Gudelj	Velež	9
10	(Socialist Federal Republic of Yugoslavia) Radmilo Mihajlović	Dinamo Zagreb	9
10	(Socialist Federal Republic of Yugoslavia) Edin Ćurić	Željezničar	9

== See also ==
- 1988–89 Yugoslav Second League
- 1988–89 Yugoslav Cup
