= Vladimir Mandić =

Vladimir Mandić may refer to:

- Vladimir Mandić (footballer)
- Vladimir Mandić (handballer)
