= Pál Dárdai (disambiguation) =

Pál Dárdai may refer to:

- Pál Dárdai (footballer, born 1951) (1951–2017), Hungarian footballer and manager
- Pál Dárdai (born 1976), Hungarian footballer and manager
- Pál "Palkó" Dárdai (born 1999), German-Hungarian footballer
