= Predojević =

Predojević (Serbian Cyrillic: Предојевић) is a Serbo-Croatian surname, a patronymic derived from the Old Serbian name Predoje. It is traditionally found in Herzegovina, borne by ethnic Serbs. The surname is found in Serbs in Ervenik, Croatia. It may refer to:

- Borki Predojević (b. 1987), Bosnian chess Grandmaster
- Draženko Predojević, Bosnian Serb acquitted war crime indictee (Army of Republika Srpska)
- Telli Hasan Pasha (Hasan-paša Predojević, d. 1593), Ottoman Bosnian military commander
- Gabrijel Predojević, Bishop of Marča 1642–1644
- Maksim Predojević, Bishop of Marča 1630–1642
- Matthias Predojević (born 1976), German-Croatian footballer
- Nemanja Predojević, Serbian TV actor (Potpisani)
- Vasilije Predojević, Bishop of Marča 1644–1648
- Vladimir Predojević, Serbian icon painter (St. Michael's Cathedral)
- Srđan Predojević, Serbian TV-host (RTV Pink)

== See also ==
- Predojević church, ruins of a 16th-century church in Plana, Bosnia and Herzegovina
- Predović, surname
- Predić, surname

== Sources ==
- Grković, Milica (1977). Rečnik ličnih imena kod Srba. Belgrade: Vuk Karadžić.
- Janjatović, Đorđe (1993). Презимена Срба у Босни. Sombor: Prosveta-Trgovina.
- Milićević, Risto (2005). Hercegovačka prezimena. Belgrade.
