= Đorđe Ćurčić =

Đorđe Ćurčić may refer to:

- Đorđe Ćurčić (basketball, born 2004), Serbian basketball player (Borac Čačak)
- Đorđe Ćurčić (basketball, born 2005), Serbian basketball player (Borac Čačak)
- Đorđe Ćurčić (footballer) (born 1956), Serbian footballer with FK Vojvodina
