= Dzhandzhgava =

Dzhandzhgava is a surname. Notable people with the surname include:

- Irakli Dzhandzhgava (born 1964), Russian footballer
- Tatyana Dzhandzhgava (born 1964), Kazakhstani-Austrian handball player
- Teona Dzhandzhgava (born 1997), Georgian gymnast

== See also ==
- Dzhardzhan Range
