= Irakli Dzhandzhgava =

Russian footballer

Personal information
- Full name: Irakli Georgievitch Dzhandzhgava
- Date of birth: 22 August 1966 (age 60)
- Place of birth: Krasnodar, Soviet Union
- Height: 1.82 m (5 ft 11 1/2 in)
- Position: Goalkeeper

Youth career
- 1983–1985: Kuban Krasnodar

Senior career*
Years	Team	Apps	(Gls)
1985–1987	Kuban Krasnodar	50	(0)
1987–1988	SKA Rostov-on-Don	2	(0)
1989	Kuban Krasnodar	13	(0)
1990	Sokol Saratov	2	(0)
1990	Druzhba Maykop	31	(0)
1990–1991	Lovćen Cetinje		
1991–1992	Mogren Budva	13	(0)
- * Club domestic league appearances and goals

Irakli Georgievitch Dzhandzhgava (Russian: Иракли Георгиевич Джанджгава, born 21 January 1964) is a former Russian football goalkeeper.

== Club career ==
Born in Krasnodar, Russian SSR, Soviet Union, Dzhandzhgava played with FC Kuban Krasnodar, FC SKA Rostov-on-Don in the Soviet Second League. He also played with FC Sokol Saratov and FC Druzhba Maykop before moving abroad in 1990. He moved to Yugoslavia, to Montenegro, and after playing one season with FK Lovćen, he played with FK Mogren in the 1991–92 Yugoslav Second League.
