= Atila Kasaš =

Serbian football manager and player

Personal information
- Full name: Atila Kasaš
- Date of birth: 21 September 1968 (age 58)
- Place of birth: Bečej, SR Serbia, SFR Yugoslavia
- Height: 1.79 m (5 ft 10 in)
- Position: Striker

Youth career
- Vojvodina

Senior career*
Years	Team	Apps	(Gls)
1985–1986	Vojvodina	5	(0)
1989–1994	Bečej	70+	(27+)
1994–1995	Logroñés	11	(0)
1996	BVSC	7	(1)
1997	Bečej	25	(5)
Total		118+	(33+)

Managerial career
- 2014–2015: Bečej
- * Club domestic league appearances and goals

Atila Kasaš (Serbian Cyrillic: Атила Касаш, Hungarian: Kaszás Attila; born 21 September 1968) is a Serbian football manager and former player of Hungarian descent.

== Playing career ==
Kasaš made his Yugoslav First League debut with Vojvodina in the 1985–86 season, appearing in five games, as the club suffered relegation. He later made a name for himself at Bečej, helping them to a double promotion to reach the top flight in 1992. After scoring 20 goals in the 1993–94 First League of FR Yugoslavia, Kasaš moved abroad to Spanish club Logroñés. He also briefly played for Hungarian side BVSC, before returning to Bečej.

== Managerial career ==
Kasaš served as manager of Bečej between October 2014 and May 2015.

== Career statistics ==
Club	Season	League	
Club	Season	Apps	Goals
Vojvodina	1985–86	5	0
Bečej	1991–92	4	0
Bečej	1992–93	33	7
Bečej	1993–94	33	20
Bečej	Total	70	27
Logroñés	1994–95	11	0
BVSC	1996–97	7	1
Bečej	1996–97	12	2
Bečej	1997–98	13	3
Bečej	Total	25	5
