= Predić =

Predić is a Serbian surname. It may refer to:

- Uroš Predić (1857-1953), Yugoslav-Serbian painter
- Uroš Predić (born 1973), footballer

== See also ==
- Predojević
