= Mehmed Karamehmedović =

Bosnian-Herzegovinian footballer

Personal information
- Date of birth: 19 March 1944 (age 82)
- Place of birth: Trebinje, Yugoslavia
- Position: Defender

Youth career
- Metalac Trebinje

Senior career*
Years	Team	Apps	(Gls)
1963–1966	Leotar Trebinje		
1966–1969	Velež Mostar	86	(2)
1969–1971	Vojvodina	63	(0)
1971–1973	Radnički Kragujevac	22	(0)
1973–1977	Iskra Stolac		
- * Club domestic league appearances and goals

Mehmed Karamehmedović (born 19 March 1944) is a former Bosnian-Herzegovinian footballer who played in several clubs in the Yugoslav First League.

== Club career ==
Born in Trebinje, he started playing in a local club named Metalac, before moving to Leotar in 1963 where he played 3 seasons. However, he will reach recognition during his stint with Velež where he became a regular central defender and where he played 3 seasons. In 1969 as an already established First League player, he moved to FK Vojvodina where, in the two seasons he stayed there, only missed 5 league matches. He also played with Radnički Kragujevac between 1971 and 1973, and he finished his career playing with FK Iskra Stolac.

== External sources ==
- Mehmed Karamehmedović at WorldFootball.net
