= Dimitrije Injac =

Serbian footballer (born 1980)

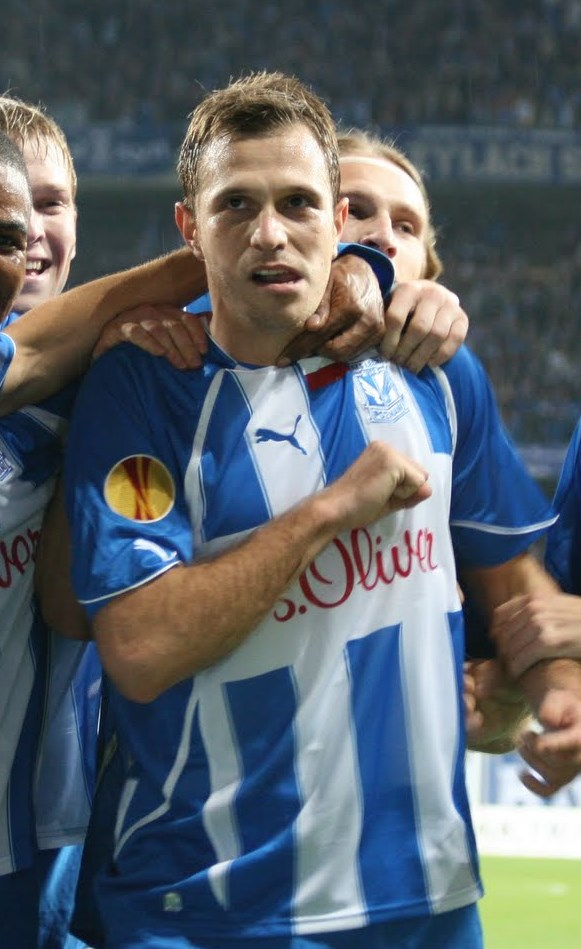
- Injac with Lech Poznań in 2010

Personal information
- Date of birth: 12 August 1980 (age 46)
- Place of birth: Kikinda, SFR Yugoslavia
- Height: 1.82 m (6 ft 0 in)
- Position: Defensive midfielder

Senior career*
Years	Team	Apps	(Gls)
1995–1996	OFK Kikinda	9	(9)
1996–2005	Vojvodina	3	(0)
1998–1999	→ Bečej (loan)	3	(0)
2000–2002	→ Kabel (loan)	43	(4)
2002–2003	→ Bečej (loan)	30	(2)
2003–2004	→ Kabel (loan)	11	(0)
2004–2005	→ Bečej (loan)	20	(2)
2005–2007	Slavija Sarajevo	50	(4)
2007–2012	Lech Poznań	148	(5)
2012–2013	Polonia Warsaw	7	(0)
2013–2014	Lech Poznań	8	(0)
2013–2014	Lech Poznań II	3	(0)
2014–2015	Widzew Łódź	9	(0)
Total		344	(31)

International career
2011	Serbia	1	(0)
- * Club domestic league appearances and goals

Dimitrije "Dima" Injac (Serbian Cyrillic: Димитрије Ињац; born 12 August 1980) is a Serbian retired footballer who played as a midfielder. He currently works as a personal coach for Lech Poznań Academy.

== Club career ==
His former clubs were OFK Kikinda, FK Kabel, FK Vojvodina, FK Bečej and FK Slavija Sarajevo.

In January 2007, he joined Lech Poznań on a three-year contract.

On 24 August 2012, Injac signed a two-year contract with Polonia Warsaw.

== International career ==
He played his only match for Serbia in February 2011 against Israel.

== Career statistics ==
Appearances and goals by club, season and competition
Club	Season	League			National cup (Note: Includes Polish Cup)		Europe		Other		Total	
Club	Season	Division	Apps	Goals	Apps	Goals	Apps	Goals	Apps	Goals	Apps	Goals
Lech Poznań	2006–07	Ekstraklasa	14	1	2	0	0	0	2 (Note: Appearances in Ekstraklasa Cup)	0	18	1
Lech Poznań	2007–08	Ekstraklasa	23	2	1	0	—		4	0	28	2
Lech Poznań	2008–09	Ekstraklasa	26	0	7	0	10 (Note: Appearances in UEFA Cup)	2	3	0	46	2
Lech Poznań	2009–10	Ekstraklasa	29	1	1	0	4 (Note: Appearances in UEFA Europa League)	0	—		34	1
Lech Poznań	2010–11	Ekstraklasa	28	1	6	1	12 (Note: Four appearances in UEFA Champions League, eight appearances and one goal in UEFA Europa League)	1	0	0	46	3
Lech Poznań	2011–12	Ekstraklasa	28	0	3	0	—		—		31	0
Lech Poznań	Total		148	5	20	0	26	3	9	0	203	8
Polonia Warsaw	2012–13	Ekstraklasa	7	0	1	0	—		—		8	0
Lech Poznań	2013–14	Ekstraklasa	8	0	0	0	0	0	—		8	0
Lech Poznań II	2013–14	III liga, gr. D	3	0	—		—		—		3	0
Widzew Łódź	2014–15	I liga	9	0	1	0	—		—		10	0
Career total			175	5	22	0	26	3	9	0	232	8

== Honours ==
Lech Poznań

- Ekstraklasa: 2009–10
- Polish Cup: 2008–09
