= Dejan Godar =

Croatian footballer

Personal information
- Date of birth: 19 May 1978 (age 48)
- Place of birth: Subotica, SR Serbia, SFR Yugoslavia
- Height: 1.86 m (6 ft 1 in)
- Position: Midfielder

Youth career
- Tavankut

Senior career*
Years	Team	Apps	(Gls)
1996–1997	Spartak Subotica		
1997–1998	Szeged		
1998–1999	Vojvodina	0	(0)
1999–2001	Osijek	6	(0)
2002	Belišće		
2002–2003	Inker Zaprešić		
2003–2007	RoPS	111	(16)
2008	Degerfors	16	(0)
2009	Bylish Ballsh	16	(1)
2010	Degerfors		
- * Club domestic league appearances and goals

Dejan Godar (born 19 May 1978) is a Croatian former professional footballer who played as a midfielder.

== Career ==
Godar is originally from the village of Tavankut in Bačka in autonomous province of Vojvodina, Serbia. He previously played for Tavankut, Spartak Subotica, FC Szeged, Solunac Karađorđevo, Vojvodina, Osijek (in 2000–01), Belišće, INKER (2002–03). Godar joined Finnish club RoPS in 2003, and he played the 2004 and 2005 seasons in the Veikkausliiga. In the spring of 2008, he joined Swedish club Degerfors IF. After one season spell in Sweden Godar joined Albanian club KS Bylish Ballsh and then returned playing in 2010 with Degerfors again.

== Awards ==
On the first "Croatian European Club Championship" held in December 2006 in Split, Croatia, he won the 3rd place with his squad of Vojvodina Croats, and Godar was declared as the best player of the tournament.

2007 he was pronounced as Player of the Year in Finnish 2. division, Ykkönen. That season his excellent games in RoPS brought his club the promotion to Finnish top division Veikkausliiga.

== Honours ==
Bylis

- Albanian First Division: 2009–10
