= Goran Zarić =

Australian-Serbian soccer player

Personal information
- Full name: Goran Zarić
- Date of birth: 19 September 1974 (age 52)
- Place of birth: Australia
- Height: 1.87 m (6 ft 1 1/2 in)
- Position: Defender

Senior career*
Years	Team	Apps	(Gls)
1995–1996	Borac Čačak		
1996–1998	Vojvodina	0	(0)
1999–2000	Lausanne-Sport	5	(0)
2001–2002	Baulmes		
2002–2003	Čukarički Stankom	14	(0)
2004	Gazovik Izhevsk	11	(1)
2007–2008	South Melbourne		
- * Club domestic league appearances and goals

Goran Zarić (Serbian Cyrillic: Горан Зарић, born 19 September 1974) is an Australian-Serbian football defender.

== Club career ==
After playing with FK Borac Čačak and FK Vojvodina in the First League of FR Yugoslavia he moved during the winter-break of the 1998–99 season to Switzerland and joined FC Lausanne-Sport. During winter-break of 2000–01 he moved to FC Baulmes. In summer 2002 he was back to Serbia, this time joining FK Čukarički. In 2004, he played with FC Gazovik Izhevsk in the Russian Second Division. In 2007, he joined Australian side South Melbourne FC playing in the Victorian Premier League.

== Honors ==
Lausanne-Sport

- Swiss Cup: 1999
