= Francis Afriyie =

Ghanaian footballer

Personal information
- Full name: Francis Afriyie
- Date of birth: 18 January 1995 (age 31)
- Place of birth: Brong-Ahafo, Ghana
- Height: 1.85 m (6 ft 1 in)
- Position: Forward

Senior career*
Years	Team	Apps	(Gls)
2016	Bechem United	10	(2)
2017	Vojvodina	0	(0)
2018	Murciélagos	9	(2)
2019	Gor Mahia		
2020	Township Rollers		
- * Club domestic league appearances and goals as of 26 August 2020

Francis Afriyie (born January 18, 1995) is a Ghanaian footballer who plays as a forward.

== Career ==
Afriyie played back home with Bechem United. During winter-break of 2016–17, he, along his teammate Joseph Bempah joined Serbian side FK Vojvodina. A year later, without making any appearance in the Serbian SuperLiga, again along his compatriot Bempah, both left Europe and moved to Mexican side Murciélagos F.C. After Murcielagos' relegation due to financial issues, Francis Afriyie joined Gor Mahia F.C.

In January 2020, Afriyie joined Botswana Premier League club Township Rollers.
