= Frederick Enaholo =

Swedish footballer (born 1971)

Personal information
- Date of birth: 12 March 1971 (age 55)
- Place of birth: Kiruna, Sweden
- Height: 1.83 m (6 ft 0 in)
- Position: Goalkeeper

Youth career
- Vojvodina Novi Sad

Senior career*
Years	Team	Apps	(Gls)
1992–1994	IFK Trelleborg	68	(0)
1995–1997	Trelleborgs FF	10	(0)
2000–2001	IFK Malmö	37	(0)
- * Club domestic league appearances and goals

Frederick Enaholo (born 12 March 1971) is a Swedish former footballer who played as a goalkeeper.

== Early life ==
Frederick Enaholo was born to a Serbian mother and Nigerian father. He started his football career in Vojvodina Novi Sad.

== Career ==
In 1992, Enaholo arrived in Sweden and trialed with Malmö FF. He did not succeed and instead he joined IFK Trelleborg and later Trelleborgs FF in 1995. He made his Allsvenskan debut on 9 April in a 0–0 draw against Örebro SK. He ended his career in IFK Malmö.
