= Michal Baláž =

Serbian-Slovak footballer (born 1970)

Personal information
- Date of birth: 28 August 1970 (age 56)
- Place of birth: Stara Pazova, SFR Yugoslavia
- Position: Goalkeeper

Youth career
- 1985–1988: Vojvodina

Senior career*
Years	Team	Apps	(Gls)
1988–1992	Vojvodina	1	(0)
1989–1990	→ Kabel (loan)		
1992–1994	BSK Batajnica		
1995	Spartak Trnava	5	(0)
1996–1998	Petrimex Prievidza	61	(0)
1998–1999	Sportfreunde Siegen	7	(0)
2000	SV Wilhelmshaven	8	(0)
2000	KFC Uerdingen 05	1	(0)
2001–2003	Sportfreunde Siegen	27	(0)
2003	Inđija		
2004	Jedinstvo Stara Pazova		
- * Club domestic league appearances and goals

Michal Baláž (Serbian: Mihal Balaž / Михал Балаж; born 28 August 1970) is a Serbian-Slovak retired footballer who played as a goalkeeper.

== Career ==
Born in Stara Pazova, SR Serbia, back then within Yugoslavia, Baláž started playing with FK Vojvodina. He made a league debut for them in his only appearance in the 1990–91 Yugoslav First League. He spent the season 1989–90 on loan at third level side FK Kabel. He then played two seasons with FK BSK Batajnica until 1994.

In Autumn 1995 he played in Slovakia, with FC Spartak Trnava in the first half of the 1995–96 Slovak Superliga. He was playing with FK Petrimex Prievidza in the Slovak Super Liga before moving to Germany in summer 1998 and joining Sportfreunde Siegen. He also played with SV Wilhelmshaven during the second half of the 1999–2000 season. He later played with KFC Uerdingen 05 during the first half of the 2000–01 Regionalliga and then during the winter-break he returned to Sportfreunde Siegen and played with them the following two and a half years in the Regionalliga Sud.
