= Bence Dárdai =

Hungarian footballer (born 2006)

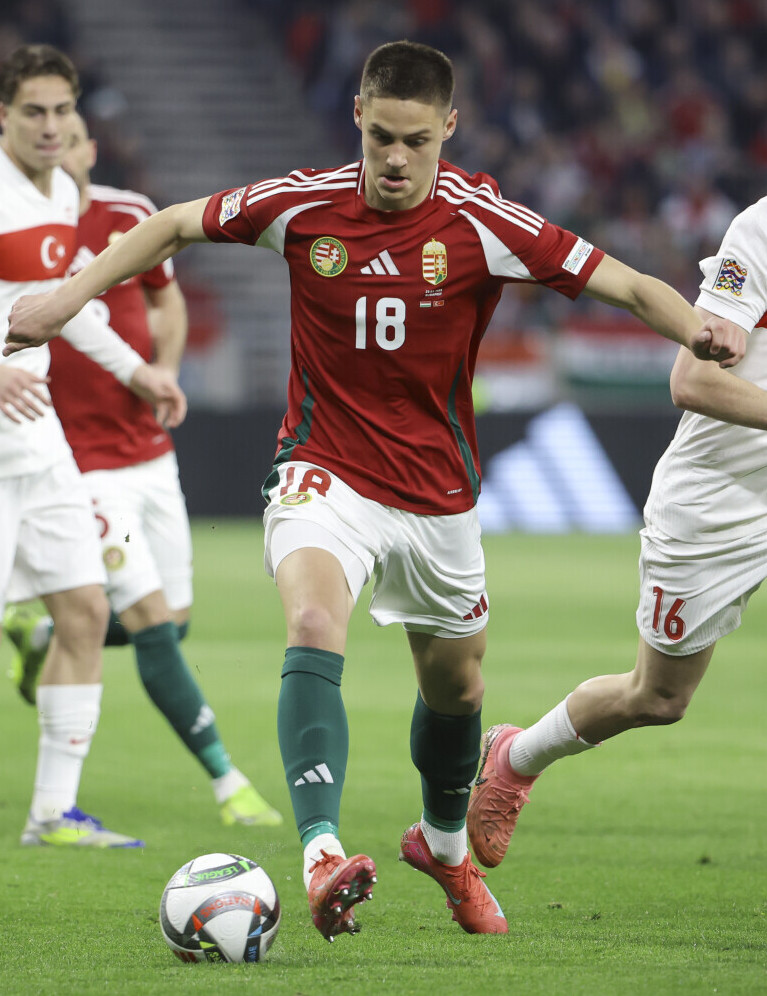
- Dárdai with Hungary in 2025.

Personal information
- Date of birth: 24 January 2006 (age 20)
- Place of birth: Berlin, Germany
- Height: 1.88 m (6 ft 2 in)
- Position: Midfielder

Team information
- Current team: VfL Wolfsburg
- Number: 8

Youth career
- 2012–2023: Hertha BSC

Senior career*
| Years | Team | Apps | (Gls) |
| 2023–2024 | Hertha BSC II | 4 | (0) |
| 2023–2024 | Hertha BSC | 8 | (0) |
| 2024– | VfL Wolfsburg | 24 | (1) |

International career^{‡}
| 2021–2022 | Germany U16 | 6 | (2) |
| 2022–2023 | Germany U17 | 8 | (2) |
| 2024 | Germany U18 | 3 | (0) |
| 2024 | Germany U19 | 7 | (1) |
| 2025– | Hungary | 3 | (0) |
Medal record
Men's football
Representing Germany
UEFA European Under-17 Championship
| Winner | 2023 Hungary |
- * Club domestic league appearances and goals as of 18 September 2026 ‡ National team caps and goals as of 23:30, 10 June 2025 (UTC)

Bence Dárdai (born 24 January 2006) is a professional footballer who plays as a midfielder for 2. Bundesliga club VfL Wolfsburg. Born in Germany, he plays for the Hungary national team.

== Career ==
=== Hertha ===
Dárdai is a youth product of Hertha BSC, and started training with their senior side in 2023 on a support contract until 2024. He made his senior and professional debut with Hertha BSC as a late substitute in a 1–0 2. Bundesliga loss to Fortuna Düsseldorf on 29 July 2023. He made his debut alongside his 2 brothers, and was coached by his father.

=== Wolfsburg ===
On 4 June 2024, Dárdai signed a long-term contract with VfL Wolfsburg. On 31 August 2024, he played his first Bundesliga match in a 2–1 victory over Holstein Kiel on the second game week of the 2024–25 Bundesliga season. Dárdai entered the pitch as a substitute for Tiago Tomás in the 80th minute. On 2 November 2024, he was included in the starting lineup and was not substituted in a 1–1 draw against FC Augsburg in the 2024–25 Bundesliga season.

He suffered a cruciate ligament rupture; therefore, he had to rest for months. On 2 April 2026, he could start training with balls on a turf after months of convalescence.

On 24 August 2026, he returned from his injury in a 3–3 draw with Regionalliga Nordost team VSG Altglienicke in a 2026–27 DFB-Pokal match. The match was won by Wolfsburg (5–6) on penalties. However, a couple of days later, he suffered an ankle injury.

== International career ==
At the 2023 UEFA European Under-17 Championship held in his father's country Hungary, he scored the second penalty as Germany beat France 5–4 in a penalty shoot-out victory in the final.

On 21 February 2025, Dárdai's request to switch allegiance to Hungary was approved by FIFA.

On 10 March 2025, he was called up for Hungary against Turkey in a 2024–25 UEFA Nations League promotion/relegation play-offs match. In an interview with Nemzeti Sport, he said that it does not matter in which position, he wants to play for Hungary. On 19 March 2025, it was revealed that he got injured along with Roland Sallai; therefore, he did not join the team that travelled to Turkey. He made his debut in the second leg as a starter.

== Personal life ==
Dárdai is the son of Hungarian manager and former footballer Pál Dárdai, and the younger brother of the footballers Palkó and Márton Dárdai. Bence's grandfather was also a footballer and manager, and also named Pál Dárdai. It was revealed by Nemzeti Sport, that Dárdai brothers (Márton and Bence) could be the first brothers who play for the national team at the same time after the Vince brothers (Ottó and Gábor).

== Career statistics ==
=== Club ===
As of 18 September 2026.

Appearances and goals by club, season and competition
| Club | Season | League | | | DFB-Pokal | | Other | | Total | |
| Club | Season | Division | Apps | Goals | Apps | Goals | Apps | Goals | Apps | Goals |
|---|---|---|---|---|---|---|---|---|---|---|
| Hertha BSC II | 2023–24 | Regionalliga Nordost | 4 | 0 | — | | — | | 4 | 0 |
| Hertha BSC | 2023–24 | 2. Bundesliga | 8 | 0 | 1 | 0 | 0 | 0 | 9 | 0 |
| VfL Wolfsburg | 2024–25 | Bundesliga | 21 | 1 | 4 | 0 | — | | 25 | 1 |
| VfL Wolfsburg | 2025–26 | Bundesliga | 1 | 0 | 2 | 0 | — | | 3 | 0 |
| VfL Wolfsburg | 2026–27 | 2. Bundesliga | 2 | 0 | 1 | 0 | — | | 3 | 0 |
| VfL Wolfsburg | Total | | 24 | 1 | 7 | 0 | — | | 31 | 1 |
| Career total | | | 36 | 1 | 8 | 0 | 0 | 0 | 44 | 1 |

=== International ===
As of match played 10 June 2025

Appearances and goals by national team and year
| National team | Year | Apps | Goals |
|---|---|---|---|
| Hungary | 2025 | 3 | 0 |
| Total | | 3 | 0 |

== Honours ==
Germany U17

- UEFA European Under-17 Championship: 2023
