= Nemanja Šarčević =

Serbian politician

Nemanja Šarčević (Serbian Cyrillic: Немања Шарчевић; born 1984) is a politician in Serbia. He served in the Assembly of Vojvodina from 2016 to 2020 as a member of the far-right Serbian Radical Party (Srpska radikalna stranka, SRS). Šarčević was a member of the People's Party (Narodna stranka, NS). Šarčević is now member of the "Narodni Pokret Srbije"

== Private career ==
Šarčević is a graduated sports manager. He is from Subotica in the province of Vojvodina.

== Politician ==
The Radical Party contested the 2008 Serbian local elections in Subotica in an alliance with the Democratic Party of Serbia (Demokratska stranka Srbije, DSS), New Serbia (Nova Srbija, NS), and the Socialist Party of Serbia (Socijalistička partija Srbije, SPS). Šarčević, who was a student at the time, appeared in the thirty-fifth position on the coalition's electoral list. The list won thirteen mandates, and he was not included in the SRS's delegation in the local assembly.

Šarčević was given the seventh position on the SRS's list for the Vojvodina provincial assembly in the 2016 provincial election and was elected when the list won ten mandates. He also led a combined list of the SRS, the DSS, and Dveri in Subotica in the concurrent 2016 local elections. The latter list did not cross the electoral threshold to win any mandates.

In 2016, Šarčević was condemned by other Vojvodina politicians for a speech in which he used derogatory terms to describe the leaders of Croatia, Bosnia and Hercegovina, and Kosovo.

In 2019. Nemanja Šarčević, a representative in the Vojvodina parliament, demanded a response from the state institutions after a member of the Narodni slobodarski pokret (NSP) called Subotica's Nela Tonković, the new director of the National Museum in Šabac, an "Ustaša" on his Facebook profile. Šarčević was concerned about the rising political extremism and hateful rhetoric in Serbia.

He alluded to serious divisions in the Radical Party in a February 2020 interview, saying that he had been disappointed in its direction since party leader Vojislav Šešelj returned to Serbia from detention in The Hague in late 2014. He specifically criticized Šešelj for not taking a stronger stand against Serbian president Aleksandar Vučić and the Serbian Progressive Party (Srpska napredna stranka, SNS). Šarčević was not a candidate in the 2020 provincial election.

After leaving the assembly, Šarčević made the somewhat unusual move from the Radical Party to the People's Party. As of 2021, he is a member of the latter party's city board in Subotica.
