= Zoran Hajdić =

Serbian footballer

Personal information
- Date of birth: 24 September 1969 (age 57)
- Place of birth: Serbia
- Height: 1.85 m (6 ft 1 in)
- Position: Defender

Senior career*
Years	Team	Apps	(Gls)
1990-1991	Vojvodina	22	(2)
1992	Bečej	5	(0)
1993-1994	Radnički Beograd	30	(7)
1993	→ Vojvodina (loan)	11	(2)
1994–1998	Salgueiros	73	(3)
1999–2000	Vojvodina		
2000–2001	Peniche		
- * Club domestic league appearances and goals

Zoran Hajdić (born 24 September 1969) is a retired Serbian football defender.
