= Siniša Mulina =

Bosnian footballer

Personal information
- Full name: Siniša Mulina
- Date of birth: 7 February 1973 (age 53)
- Place of birth: SFR Yugoslavia
- Position: Midfielder

Team information
- Current team: Leotar; Coach of U18 squad

Senior career*
Years	Team	Apps	(Gls)
1993–1996	Bečej	95	(16)
1996–1997	Partizan	12	(2)
1997–2000	Milicionar	79	(29)
2001	Vojvodina	11	(0)
2001–2002	Omladinac Banja Luka	13	(7)
2002–2005	Leotar	51	(16)
2005	Zrinjski Mostar	9	(0)
2006–2008	Leotar	59	(15)
2008–2009	GOŠK Dubrovnik	13	(1)
2009–2010	Leotar	2	(0)

International career
2002–2003	Bosnia and Herzegovina	3	(0)

Managerial career
- Leotar U18
- * Club domestic league appearances and goals

Siniša Mulina (born 7 February 1973) is a Bosnian retired footballer.

== Club career ==
Mulina started his senior career at top Serbian league club FK Bečej. Next he moved to FK Partizan where he played one season and won the First League of FR Yugoslavia in 1996-97. Next season he moved to FK Milicionar and in 2001 had a brief spell with FK Vojvodina. Then, he moved to First League of the Republika Srpska, where he was spotted by FK Leotar. He played for Leotar in every Bosnian Premier League since 2002, except in 2005 when signed by defending champion HŠK Zrinjski Mostar. He played for Zrinjski in 2005–06 UEFA Champions League qualifiers. He later played with Leotar between 2005 and 2008. He had a short spell in 2008-09 with NK GOŠK Dubrovnik in the Croatian 3. HNL, before finishing his career with Leotar in 2009–10.

== International career ==
He made his debut for Bosnia and Herzegovina in a September 2002 European Championship qualification match against Romania and has earned a total of 3 caps, scoring no goals. His final international was an April 2003 European Championship qualification match away against Denmark.

== Coaching career ==
By June 2015 he was the coach of FK Leotar U18 team.

== Honours ==
Partizan

- First League of FR Yugoslavia: 1996-97

Leotar

- Premier League of Bosnia and Herzegovina: 2003
