= Miroslav Milutinović =

Bosnian-Herzegovinian footballer

Personal information
- Full name: Miroslav Milutinović
- Date of birth: February 1, 1985 (age 41)
- Place of birth: Zvornik, SFR Yugoslavia
- Height: 1.77 m (5 ft 10 in)
- Position: Right-back

Senior career*
Years	Team	Apps	(Gls)
2003–2004	Vojvodina	0	(0)
2003–2004	→ Cement Beočin (loan)	25	(0)
2004–2006	ČSK Čelarevo	62	(0)
2006–2010	Vojvodina	17	(0)
2010	Kolubara	0	(0)
2011	Novi Sad	11	(1)
2012	Inđija	14	(0)
2012–2013	Hajduk Kula	18	(0)
2013	Inđija	9	(0)
2014–2016	Kolubara	6	(0)
- * Club domestic league appearances and goals

Miroslav Milutinović (Serbian Cyrillic: Мирослав Милутиновић; born February 1, 1985) is a Bosnian-Herzegovinian retired football defender.

== Club career ==
He had previously played with lower league clubs FK Cement Beočin and FK ČSK Čelarevo and also with FK Vojvodina in the Serbian SuperLiga.
