= Dragan Gaćeša =

Serbian footballer

Personal information
- Full name: Dragan Gaćeša
- Date of birth: October 12, 1965 (age 61)
- Place of birth: Novi Sad, SFR Yugoslavia
- Height: 1.75 m (5 ft 9 in)
- Position: Full back

Senior career*
Years	Team	Apps	(Gls)
1982–1990	Vojvodina	78	(0)
1990–1998	União Madeira	209	(7)
Total		287	(7)
- * Club domestic league appearances and goals

Dragan Gaćeša (Serbian Cyrillic: Драган Гаћеша, born 12 October 1965) is a Serbian retired footballer who played as a full back.

== Football career ==
Born in Novi Sad, SFR Yugoslavia, in his country, Gaćeša represented FK Vojvodina helping it win the Yugoslav championship in the 1988–89 season.

In summer of 1990, he moved to Portugal where he played for Uniao Madeira for 8 years.
