= Srđan Radosavljev =

Serbian footballer

Personal information
- Date of birth: 25 May 1983 (age 43)
- Place of birth: Vršac, SFR Yugoslavia
- Height: 1.74 m (5 ft 9 in)
- Position: Midfielder

Senior career*
Years	Team	Apps	(Gls)
2001–2002	Proleter Zrenjanin	15	(3)
2002–2007	Mladost Apatin		
2007–2008	Vojvodina	3	(0)
2008	→ Banat Zrenjanin (loan)	14	(0)
2008–2013	Banat Zrenjanin	54	(2)
2011	→ Palić (loan)	6	(1)
2013–2014	Bačka 1901	22	(2)
- * Club domestic league appearances and goals as of 1 August 2014

Srđan Radosavljev (Serbian Cyrillic: Срђан Радосављев; born 25 May 1983) is a Serbian retired footballer who played mainly as midfielder.

Born in Vršac, SR Serbia, he represented several clubs during his career, spending most of the time with Mladost Apatin and Banat Zrenjanin.
