= Dušan Alempić =

Bosnian-Serb footballer (born 1952)

Personal information
- Full name: Dušan Alempić
- Date of birth: 20 May 1952 (age 74)
- Place of birth: Zvornik, SFR Yugoslavia
- Position: Goalkeeper

Team information
- Current team: Krpan & Babić academy Gk coach

Youth career
- Jug Sarajevo
- Drina Zvornik

Senior career*
Years	Team	Apps	(Gls)
1971–1973	Drina Zvornik		
1973–1978	Čelik Zenica	135	(0)
1978–1983	Osijek	99	(0)
1983–1984	Dinamo Vinkovci	13	(0)
1986–1987	Vojvodina	30	(0)
1987–1990	Metalac Osijek		

Managerial career
- Lastovo (gk coach)
- Metalac Osijek (gk coach)
- Olimpija Osijek (gk coach)
- Krpan & Babić academy (gk coach)
- * Club domestic league appearances and goals

Dušan Alempić (Serbian Cyrillic: Душан Алемпић; born 20 May 1952) is a Bosnian Serb retired football goalkeeper.

== Playing career ==
=== Club ===
Born in Zvornik, in Yugoslav republic of SR Bosnia and Herzegovina, Alempić began his goalkeeping career in Sarajevo at a youth team in Jug, and then back in his home-town side FK Drina Zvornik. He became senior at Drina, playing two seasons with them in Yugoslav third level between 1971 and 1973. Bosnian side NK Čelik Zenica, searching talents from the region, brought him in 1973. Alimpić grabbed the opportunity immediately becoming Čalik's main goalkeeper in the 1973–74 Yugoslav First League, Alimpić' debuting season at first level in which he made 22 appearances. This solid start cemented Alempić in the starting line-up in the total of five seasons he spent with Čelik in the Yugoslav First League. After this period, he signed with Croatian side NK Osijek in 1978. He spent five seasons with Osijek, with up's and down's, which included a relegation to the Yugoslav Second League followed by immediate promotion back again to top level. He left Osijek in 1983 and moved to the neighbouring Croatian town of Vinkovci, having at the time a top-league side, Dinamo Vinkovci, where he played as their goalkeeper in the 1983–84 Yugoslav First League season. Alimpić will have a return to Yugoslav top-flight when he joined Serbian side FK Vojvodina and spent the entire 1986–87 Yugoslav First League season as their main goalkeeper. Afterwards, he returned to Osijek and played with NK Metalac Osijek in the third level between 1987 and 1990.

== Coaching career ==
After ending his playing career he became a goalkeeping coach having worked at NK Lastovo, NK Metalac Osijek and NK Olimpija Osijek. By Autumn 2013 he was part of the team of managers working at the Krpan & Babić soccer academy located in Osijek founded by former Croatian internationals Petar Krpan and Marko Babić. Besides his activities related to football, he has been teacher at elementary school "Draž".
