= Enes Muhić =

Bosnian footballer

Personal information
- Date of birth: 21 January 1961 (age 65)
- Place of birth: Vragolovi, SFR Yugoslavia
- Position: Midfielder

Senior career*
Years	Team	Apps	(Gls)
1982–1983	Jedinstvo Bihać	10	(0)
1985–1986	RFK Novi Sad	22	(6)
1988–1989	Vojvodina	4	(0)
1989–1990	Forward	38	(15)
1992	Östers IF	1	(0)
1992	Degerfors IF	18	(6)
- * Club domestic league appearances and goals

Enes Muhić (born 21 January 1961) is a Bosnian retired football midfielder.

== Club career ==
He debuted professionally in 1982–83 Yugoslav Second League playing with NK Jedinstvo Bihać. Playing at same level in the 1985–86 season with RFK Novi Sad where he managed to score 6 goals in 22 appearances that called the attention of local powerhouse fK Vojvodina which brought him and made him contribute in the extraordinary Yugoslav First League championship winning squad in 1988–89 season. Although he played more as a back-up role, he made 4 league appearances, and the title provided him enough prestige to open way to offers from abroad. Muhić opted for Swedish side BK Forward, where, as the club name suggests, he was given offensive tasks, scoring 15 goals in one season, quite an achievement for a midfielder. In 1992, he signed with more notorious Östers IF, but, after failing to get to starting eleven, he accepted a move to Degerfors IF, which proved to be a great decision as he managed to display his talent by scoring 6 goals out of 18 appearances.

== Honours ==
Vojvodina

- Yugoslav First League: 1988–89
