= Vladimir Mandić (footballer) =

Slovenian footballer

Personal information
- Date of birth: 5 July 1987 (age 39)
- Place of birth: Ptuj, SFR Yugoslavia
- Height: 1.77 m (5 ft 9 1/2 in)
- Position: Midfielder

Youth career
- 2004–2005: Šentjur
- 2005–2006: Vojvodina

Senior career*
Years	Team	Apps	(Gls)
2006–2007	Malečnik	0	(0)
2008–2009	Šentjur		
2009–2010	Alumiij		
2010–2011	Leotar Trebinje	23	(2)
2012	SV Gleinstätten	11	(2)
2012–2013	Mladost Podgorica	20	(1)
2013	Banat Zrenjanin	10	(0)
2014	Mornar Bar	13	(2)
2014–2015	Moroka Swallows	14	(1)
2015–2016	Budućnost Podgorica	5	(0)
2017	Zvijezda 09	10	(0)
2017	OFK Petrovac	16	(0)
2018	Bokelj	13	(0)
2018	OFK Vršac	16	(0)
2019–2020	Železničar Pančevo	14	(0)
2020	Feniks 1995		
2021	Cement Beočin		
2022	Veternik		
2022–2023	Hajduk Divos		
2023	Proleter 1951		
- * Club domestic league appearances and goals as of 5 February 2021

Vladimir Mandić (born 5 July 1987]) is a Slovenian of Serbian descent, a footballer who plays as a midfielder.

He had previously played in Slovenia, Austria, Bosnia and Herzegovina, and Montenegro.
