= 1991–92 Yugoslav Second League =

Yugoslav Second League
- Season: 1991–92
- Champions: Bečej
- Promoted: Bečej; Hajduk Kula; Radnički Beograd; Mogren; Kikinda; Priština; Napredak Kruševac

The Second League of Yugoslavia's 1991/1992 season was the last in which teams from Bosnia and Herzegovina and Macedonia participated, as well as the last of the Socialist Federal Republic of Yugoslavia in general as the Second League of FR Yugoslavia was established the following season. In 1992 these republics declared their independence from Yugoslavia. The clubs from Croatia and Slovenia were already playing their first seasons as separate nations.

== Teams ==
Location of teams competing in the 1991–92 Yugoslav Second League

Team	Location	Federal subject	Position in 1990–91
Balkan	Skopje	SR Macedonia	I-R
Bečej	Bečej	SR Serbia	I-R
Bor	Bor	SR Serbia	13th
Borac	Čačak	SR Serbia	19th
Čelik	Zenica	SR Bosnia and Herzegovina	I-R
Hajduk	Kula	SR Serbia	I-R
Iskra	Bugojno	SR Bosnia and Herzegovina	17th
Jedinstvo	Bijelo Polje	SR Montenegro	I-R
Leotar	Trebinje	SR Bosnia and Herzegovina	18th
Mačva	Šabac	SR Serbia	14th
Mogren	Budva	SR Montenegro	11th
Napredak	Kruševac	SR Serbia	7th
OFK Kikinda	Kikinda	SR Serbia	5th
Priština	Priština	(Socialist Republic of Serbia) SAP Kosovo	9th
Radnički	Novi Beograd	SR Serbia	10th
Radnički	Kragujevac	SR Serbia	I-R
Rudar	Prijedor	SR Bosnia and Herzegovina	I-R
Sloboda	Užice	SR Serbia	15th
Teteks	Tetovo	SR Macedonia	I-R
Vrbas	Vrbas	SR Serbia	I-R

== Season overview ==
FK Bečej was the league champion with 49 points, and together with FK Hajduk Kula, FK Radnički Beograd, FK Mogren, OFK Kikinda, FK Priština and FK Napredak Kruševac getting the promotion to the 1992–93 First League of FR Yugoslavia.

FK Sloboda Užice, FK Radnički Kragujevac, FK Mačva Šabac, FK Borac Čačak, FK Vrbas, FK Jedinstvo Bijelo Polje and FK Bor booked their places in next seasons 1992–93 Second League of FR Yugoslavia.

FK Teteks, that finished 12 and would eventually have maintained their status, along with eventually relegated FK Balkan Skopje, became members of the 1992–93 First Macedonian Football League in next season. The rest of the clubs that would eventually be relegated were all from the territory of Bosnia and Herzegovina, and all left the Yugoslav league system.

== Final table ==
Pos	Team	Pld	W	PKW	PKL	L	GF	GA	GD	Pts
1	Bečej (C)	36	23	2	3	8	69	34	+35	48
2	Hajduk Kula	36	21	5	1	9	62	34	+28	47
3	Radnički Beograd	36	20	3	4	9	58	38	+20	43
4	Mogren	36	20	2	3	11	56	36	+20	42
5	Priština	36	17	5	3	11	50	35	+15	39
6	OFK Kikinda	36	19	1	0	16	52	44	+8	39
7	Napredak Kruševac	36	16	5	2	13	61	47	+14	37
8	Sloboda Titovo Užice	36	15	6	2	13	39	37	+2	36
9	Radnički Kragujevac	36	16	3	2	15	52	44	+8	35
10	Mačva Šabac	36	15	1	3	17	49	46	+3	31
11	Borac Čačak	36	13	2	7	14	42	41	+1	28
12	Teteks	36	14	0	3	19	45	68	−23	28
13	Vrbas	36	12	3	5	16	45	50	−5	27
14	Jedinstvo Bijelo Polje	36	11	5	4	16	41	50	−9	27
15	Bor	36	10	6	2	18	35	51	−16	26
16	Čelik Zenica	19	10	3	1	5	38	18	+20	23
17	Balkan	36	10	2	6	18	26	54	−28	22
18	Leotar	36	10	2	2	22	37	64	−27	22
19	Rudar Ljubija	36	10	1	2	23	29	67	−38	21
20	Iskra Bugojno	19	3	1	3	12	15	40	−25	7

(C) Champion

== See also ==
- 1991–92 Yugoslav First League
- 1991–92 Yugoslav Cup
