= Admir Šarčević =

Bosnian-Herzegovinian footballer

Ado Šarčević
Personal information
- Full name: Admir Šarčević
- Date of birth: May 14, 1967 (age 59)
- Place of birth: Sanski Most, SFR Yugoslavia
- Position: Midfielder

Youth career
- 1974–1989: Podgrmeč Sanski Most

Senior career*
Years	Team	Apps	(Gls)
1989–1990	Vojvodina	3	(0)
1990–1992	Borac Banja Luka	35	(0)
1992–1993	Novi Pazar		
1993–1995	Prespa		
- Bosnia Calgary
- Red Deer Rangers
- Bosnian-Canadians Red Deer
- * Club domestic league appearances and goals

Admir "Ado" Šarčević (born May 14, 1967) is a retired Bosnian-Herzegovinian footballer.

== Club career ==
Born in Sanski Most, SR Bosnia and Herzegovina, back then still within Yugoslavia, Šarčević played with FK Vojvodina and FK Borac Banja Luka in the Yugoslav First League.

== Post-playing career ==
Currently he's living in Red Deer, Canada and is the Technical Director of the Red Deer Renegades soccer club. He also works as a travel agent.

== Honours ==
- Borac Banja Luka
  - Mitropa Cup: 1992

== External sources ==
- playerhistory.com
- Interview on Borac B.Luka official website. (in Serbian)
