= OFK Bečej 1918 =

Serbian football club

Bečej
- Full name: Omladinski fudbalski klub Bečej 1918
- Nicknames: Tiski brod (The Tisza's Ship); Gusari sa Tise (The Pirates of the Tisza)
- Founded: 1918; 108 years ago
- Ground: Gradski stadion kraj Tise
- Capacity: 2,296
- President: Nedeljko Vasić
- Head coach: Lazar Dabižljević
- League: Vojvodina League North
- 2024–25: Serbian League Vojvodina, 16th (relegated)
Home colours	Away colours

OFK Bečej 1918 (Serbian Cyrillic: ОФК Бечеј 1918) is a football club based in Bečej, Vojvodina, Serbia. They compete in the Vojvodina League North, the fourth tier of the national league system.

== History ==
After winning the Vojvodina League in the 1988–89 season, the club spent two years in the Yugoslav Inter-Republic League (Group North). They ended up as runners-up in 1989–90, before placing first in 1990–91 to earn promotion to the Yugoslav Second League. The club subsequently finished as champions in the competition's final edition before the breakup of Yugoslavia, getting promotion to the top flight for the first time ever.

Between 1992 and 1998, the club competed in the newly formed First League of FR Yugoslavia. They placed fourth in the 1994–95 season and secured a spot in the 1995 UEFA Intertoto Cup. The club would finish fourth out of five teams in Group 8, recording one win and three losses. They repeated their fourth-place finish in the following 1995–96, this time earning a spot in the 1996–97 UEFA Cup. However, the club was eliminated by Slovenian side Mura in the preliminary round (2–0 on aggregate).

From 1998 to 2004, the club played in the Second League of FR Yugoslavia/Serbia and Montenegro. They spent their first season in Group East and the next five in Group North, before suffering relegation to the Serbian League Vojvodina. After spending three seasons in the third tier, the club was relegated to the Vojvodina League West in 2007.

In December 2011, it was announced that the club would change its name to OFK Bečej 1918, effective from the 2012–13 season. They later won the Vojvodina League North in 2016–17 and subsequently the Serbian League Vojvodina in 2017–18 to reach the Serbian First League, the second tier of the national league pyramid. In December 2018, the club marked its 100th anniversary.

== Honours ==
Yugoslav Second League (Tier 2)

- 1991–92

Yugoslav Inter-Republic League / Serbian League Vojvodina (Tier 3)

- 1990–91 (Group North) / 2017–18

Vojvodina League / Vojvodina League North (Tier 4)

- 1988–89 / 2016–17

== Recent seasons ==
Season	League									Cup
Season	Division	Pld	W	D	L	GF	GA	Pts	Pos	Cup
Serbia
2018–19	2 – Serbian First League	37	12	8	17	39	44	26	13th	—
2019–20	3 – Vojvodina	17 (Note: The season was cut short due to the COVID-19 pandemic in Serbia.)	7	4	6	28	23	25	8th	Preliminary round
2020–21	3 – Vojvodina	38	20	5	13	80	56	65	4th	—
2021–22	3 – Vojvodina	30	13	5	12	51	56	44	8th	—
2022–23	3 – Vojvodina	28	11	2	15	39	47	35	11th	—
2023–24	3 – Vojvodina	30	12	4	14	36	45	40	10th	—
2024–25	3 – Vojvodina	30	1	5	24	12	123	7	16th	—

== European record ==
Season	Competition	Round	Opponent	Score	Aggregate
1995–96	Intertoto Cup	Group stage	(Romania) Farul Constanța	1–2 (H)	4th of 5
1995–96	Intertoto Cup	Group stage	(Belarus) Dnepr Mogilev	1–2 (A)	4th of 5
1995–96	Intertoto Cup	Group stage	(Poland) Pogoń Szczecin	2–1 (H)	4th of 5
1995–96	Intertoto Cup	Group stage	(France) Cannes	0–1 (A)	4th of 5
1996–97	UEFA Cup	Preliminary round	(Slovenia) Mura	0–0 (H), 0–2 (A)	0–2

== Notable players ==
This is a list of players who have played at full international level.

- (Bosnia and Herzegovina) Siniša Mulina
- (El Salvador) Vladan Vićević
- (Hungary) Zsombor Kerekes
- (Serbia) Kosta Aleksić
- (Serbia) Dimitrije Injac
- (Serbia and Montenegro) Radovan Krivokapić

For a list of all OFK Bečej 1918 players with a Wikipedia article, see Category:OFK Bečej 1918 players.

== Historical list of coaches ==
- (Socialist Federal Republic of Yugoslavia) Živko Stakić
- (Socialist Federal Republic of Yugoslavia) Jovan Kovrlija (1990–1991)
- (Federal Republic of Yugoslavia) Slobodan Dogandžić (1992–1993)
- (Federal Republic of Yugoslavia) Milorad Tatalović
- (Federal Republic of Yugoslavia) Đorđe Milić (1993)
- (Federal Republic of Yugoslavia) Dragan Škorić
- (Federal Republic of Yugoslavia) Josif Ilić (1994–1995)
- (Federal Republic of Yugoslavia) Dragan Okuka (1995–1996)
- (Federal Republic of Yugoslavia) Zvonko Ivezić (1996)
- (Federal Republic of Yugoslavia) Vladimir Savić
- (Federal Republic of Yugoslavia) Jovan Kovrlija (1997)
- (Federal Republic of Yugoslavia) Josip Pirmajer
- (Federal Republic of Yugoslavia) Jovan Kovrlija (1998)
- (Federal Republic of Yugoslavia) Miroslav Ćurčić
- (Serbia and Montenegro) Živko Stakić
- (Serbia and Montenegro) Atila Kasaš
- (Serbia and Montenegro) Predrag Pejović
- (Serbia) Siniša Todorović
- (Serbia) Vladimir Grbić (2011–2012)
- (Serbia) Dragan Vukajlović (2012–2013)
- (Serbia) Dalibor Novčić (2013–2014)
- (Serbia) Atila Kasaš (2014–2015)
- (Serbia) Dalibor Novčić (2015–2016)
- (Serbia) Dejan Stanojev (2016–2017)
- (Serbia) Jovica Lakić (2017–2018)
- (Serbia) Branko Savić (2018)
- (Serbia) Dejan Stanojev and (Serbia) Dalibor Novčić (2018)
- (Serbia) Dušan Bajić (2018–2019)
- (Serbia) Milan Belić (2019–2020)
- (Serbia) Branko Savić (19 Dec 2020–2022)
- (Serbia) Lazar Dabižljević (2022–2023)
- (Serbia) Damir Dakić (2023)
- (Serbia) Zoran Levnaić (2023)
- (Serbia) Damir Dakić (2023–2024)
- (Serbia) Dragan Ivanović (17 Jan 2024-18 Aug 24)
- (Serbia) Siniša Todorović (22 Aug 2024–Oct 24)
- (Serbia) Milorad Janjuš (14 Oct 2024–Dec 2024)
- (Serbia) Lazar Dabižljević (2 Feb 2025–)
