= Jovan Šarčević =

Serbian footballer (1966–2015)

Personal information
- Full name: Jovan Šarčević
- Date of birth: 7 January 1966
- Place of birth: Zrenjanin, SFR Yugoslavia
- Date of death: 26 November 2015 (aged 49)
- Place of death: Kuwait City, Kuwait
- Height: 1.91 m (6 ft 3 in)
- Position: Defender

Senior career*
Years	Team	Apps	(Gls)
1985–1991	Proleter Zrenjanin	110	(9)
1991–1993	Vojvodina	48	(2)
1993–1994	Proleter Zrenjanin	27	(2)
1994–1995	LG Cheetahs	31	(1)
1996–1999	Spartak Subotica	50	(8)
2000–2004	Budućnost Banatski Dvor	95	(33)

Managerial career
- 2008-2013: Vojvodina (academy)
- * Club domestic league appearances and goals

Jovan Šarčević (Serbian Cyrillic: Јован Шарчевић; January 7, 1966 – November 26, 2015) was a Serbian football player.

He died on November 26, 2015, in Kuwait City.

== Club career ==
Šarčević started his career with Proleter Zrenjanin in 1985, where he stayed until 1991 and played a total of 137 official matches in all competitions. He later played for FC Seoul (then known as the LG Cheetahs) of the South Korean K League between 1994 and 1995, making a total of 35 appearances in all competitions. He had a trial with Pusan I'cons at the end of 1999, but failed to join the club.

He later worked as a youth coach at Vojvodina.
