= Matthias Predojević =

German footballer

Personal information
- Date of birth: 14 November 1976 (age 49)
- Place of birth: Reutlingen, West Germany
- Height: 1.86 m (6 ft 1 in)
- Position: Midfielder

Senior career*
Years	Team	Apps	(Gls)
1995–1996	Bayern Munich II		
1996–1998	Karlsruher SC	0	(0)
1997	Novi Sad		
1998	Milicionar		
1998	União Madeira		
1999	Roeselare		
2000	Dynamo Berlin		
2000–2001	Javor Ivanjica		
2001–2002	Vojvodina	0	(0)
2002–2003	MVV	4	(0)
2003–2004	SSV Reutlingen 05	20	(2)
- * Club domestic league appearances and goals

Matthias Predojević (born 14 November 1976) is a German former professional footballer who played as a midfielder.

== Career ==
Born in Reutlingen, West Germany, he played with Bayern Munich II in 1995–96 before joining Karlsruher SC. Predojević failed to make any appearance with Karlsruher SC in the 1996–97 Bundesliga and played mostly for the second team. In 1997, he moved to Serbia, and after a spell with RFK Novi Sad he joined Milicionar in the 1997–98 First League of FR Yugoslavia. Next he left Milicionar and moved to Portugal and played with second-level side União Madeira After playing in the Portuguese island of Madeira, he returned to continental Europe and joined Roeselare from Belgium. In January 2000 he returned to Germany and signed with BFC Dynamo. Later he played in Serbia with Javor Ivanjica and then signed with Vojvodina in 2001. In summer 2002 he moved to Netherlands and played with MVV Maastricht in the 2002–03 Eerste Divisie. Then he played with SSV Reutlingen in the 2003–04 season.
