= János Borsó =

Hungarian footballer

Personal information
- Full name: János Borsó
- Date of birth: 18 April 1953 (age 73)
- Place of birth: Pécs, Hungary
- Position: Midfielder

Youth career
- 1963–1970: MTK Budapest

Senior career*
| Years | Team | Apps | (Gls) |
| 1970–1985 | MTK Budapest | 330 | (79) |
| 1985–1986 | Vojvodina | 2 | (0) |
| 1986–1987 | SC Eisenstadt | | |
| 1987–1988 | III. Kerületi TVE | | |
| 1988–1989 | SK Pama | | |

International career
| 1972–1973 | Hungary U21 | 2 | (1) |
| 1975 | Hungary U23 | 1 | (0) |
| 1980–1983 | Hungary Olympic | 7 | (0) |
| 1980 | Hungary | 1 | (0) |
- * Club domestic league appearances and goals

János Borsó (born 18 April 1953) is a Hungarian retired international footballer.

== Club career ==
János Borsó was one of the most influential players of MTK Budapest in the late 1970s and early 1980s. He is one of the rare examples of footballers who have played for 15 consecutive years in the same club. Next, he moved abroad to Yugoslavia where he represented, in the season 1985–86, a Serbian club FK Vojvodina. Before retiring, he also played in Austrian Bundesliga side SC Eisenstadt, Hungarian lower league III. Kerületi TVE and back in Austria where he played his last season with lower-league, SK Pama.

== International career ==
On March 26, 1980, he made his debut for the Hungary national team.

He also played for Hungary at U-21 and U-23 levels, and also, for Hungarian Olympic team.
