= Pál Dárdai (footballer, born 1951) =

Hungarian footballer and manager

Personal information
- Date of birth: 9 May 1951
- Place of birth: Véménd, Hungary
- Date of death: 8 December 2017 (aged 66)
- Place of death: Hungary
- Position: Midfielder

Youth career
- Véménd

Senior career*
Years	Team	Apps	(Gls)
- Honvéd Steinmetz
1972–1974	Komlói Bányász	13	(2)
1974–1985	Pécsi MFC	284	(67)
1986	Vojvodina	11	(1)
1988–1989	Pécsi MFC	1	(0)
1993–1994	Beremendi Építők	27	(2)
Total		336	(72)

Managerial career
- Komlói Bányász
- Somberek
- Beremendi Építők
- DDGáz
- Pécsi VSK
- 1995: Pécsi MFC
- 2002–2008: Barcsi SC
- 2009–2010: Dombóvári FC
- 2010–2017: Pécsi MFC
- 2010–2016: Pogány-PMFC
- * Club domestic league appearances and goals

Pál Dárdai (9 May 1951 – 8 December 2017) was a Hungarian football player and manager.

== Playing career ==
After playing with Véménd as a youngster, he began his senior career playing as midfielder with Honvéd Steinmetz. In 1972, he moved to Komlói Bányász where he spent two seasons before joining Pécsi MFC in 1974, playing in the Hungarian Championship. He played with Pécsi for more than a decade, making 284 league appearances and scoring 67 goals. He left Hungary at winter-break with a strong reputation and joined FK Vojvodina in the Yugoslav First League in the 1985–86 season, where he played along with his compatriot János Borsó. In 1988–89, he had spells with Pécsi MFC and Beremendi Építők before retiring.

== Coaching career ==
Pál Dárdai, after finishing his playing career, became a coach. He managed a number of Hungarian clubs.

== Personal life ==
He was the father of the former Hungarian international footballer and later coach Pál Dárdai, and the grandfather of Palkó, Márton and Bence Dárdai.

On 20 July 2002, Dardai's other son, Balázs Dárdai, midfielder of FC Barcs, died aged 23 during a tournament on Saturday after an artery burst when he jumped for a ball. Pál Dárdai was watching the game as the coach of FC Barcs when it happened.

On 8 December 2017, Pál Dárdai's death was announced.
