= 2024–25 Montenegrin First League =

Montenegrin First League
- Season: 2024–25
- Dates: 4 August 2024 – 24 May 2025
- Champions: Budućnost Podgorica (7th title)
- Relegated: Otrant-Olympic
- Champions League: Budućnost Podgorica
- Conference League: Dečić; Sutjeska
- Matches: 180
- Goals: 440 (2.44 per match)
- Top goalscorer: Žarko Korać (16 goals)
- Biggest home win: Jedinstvo 3–2 Arsenal Tivat (1 October 2024)
- Biggest away win: Arsenal Tivat 1–5 Budućnost (26 February 2025)
- Highest scoring: Arsenal Tivat 1–5 Budućnost (26 February 2025)
- Longest winning run: Budućnost (5 matches)
- Longest unbeaten run: Budućnost (6 matches)
- Longest losing run: Otrant-Olympic (4 matches)
- All statistics correct as of 26 February 2025.

The 2024–25 Montenegrin First League was the 19th season of the first tier association football in the country of Montenegro. The season began on 4 August 2024.

The start was originally scheduled on 28 July 2024, but was postponed due to the participation of the three clubs in European competitions.

Budućnost Podgorica won the league, qualifying for a place in the 2025–26 UEFA Champions League.

== Teams ==
2024–25 clubs

The league consisted of ten teams; the top eight teams from the previous season, and two teams promoted from the Montenegrin Second League. Dečić entered the season as defending champions.

Bokelj were promoted as champions of the 2023–24 Montenegrin Second League (returning to the top-flight after a seven-year absence), replacing the 2023–24 Montenegrin First League bottom-placed team, Rudar (relegated after eighteen years in the top-flight). Second League runners-up Otrant-Olympic defeated First League ninth-placed team Mladost DG in the Montenegrin First League play-off, promoting the former to the top-flight for the first time in its history and relegating the latter after one year in the top-flight.

=== Stadiums and locations ===
Team	City	Stadium	Capacity
FK Arsenal Tivat	Tivat	Stadion u Parku	2,000
FK Bokelj	Kotor	Stadion pod Vrmcem	1,000
FK Budućnost Podgorica	Podgorica	Stadion pod Goricom	15,230
FK Dečić	Tuzi	Stadion Tuško Polje	2,000
FK Jedinstvo Bijelo Polje	Bijelo Polje	Gradski stadion	5,000
FK Jezero	Plav	Stadion Pod Racinom	2,500
FK Mornar	Bar	Stadion Topolica	2,500
FK Otrant-Olympic	Ulcinj	Stadion Olympic	1,500
OFK Petrovac	Petrovac	Stadion Mitar Mićo Goliš	1,630
FK Sutjeska Nikšić	Nikšić	Stadion kraj Bistrice	5,214

=== Personnel and kits ===
Note: Flags indicate national team as has been defined under FIFA eligibility rules. Players may hold more than one non-FIFA nationality.

Team	Coach	Captain	Kit manufacturer	Shirt sponsor
Arsenal Tivat	(Montenegro) Derviš Hadžiosmanović	(Montenegro) Ćetko Manojlović	(Montenegro) Lmp	Porto Montenegro
Bokelj	(Montenegro) Slobodan Drasković	(Montenegro) Lazar Pajović	(Serbia) NAAI	
Budućnost Podgorica	(Montenegro) Ivan Brnović	(Montenegro) Vasilije Terzić	(Germany) Adidas	Savana
Dečić	(Bosnia and Herzegovina) Edis Mulalić	(Montenegro) Jonathan Dreshaj	(Serbia) Seven	Castellana
Jedinstvo Bijelo Polje	(Montenegro) Sead Babača	(Montenegro) Momčilo Dulović	(Serbia) NAAI	Hotel Splendid
Jezero	(Montenegro) Miodrag Džudović	(Montenegro) Edis Redžepagić	(Italy) Macron	Samont
Mornar	(Montenegro) Simo Medigović	(Montenegro) Aleksandar Vujačić	(Serbia) Seven	Municipality of Bar
Otrant-Olympic	(Montenegro) Dzemal Kaplanbegu	(Montenegro) Anđelo Rudović		
Petrovac	(Montenegro) Zdravko Dragićević	(Montenegro) Zoran Mikijelj	(Italy) Macron	Municipality of Budva
Sutjeska Nikšić	(Montenegro) Milija Savović	(Montenegro) Vladan Giljen	(Spain) Joma	Intersport

== League table ==
Pos	Team	Pld	W	D	L	GF	GA	GD	Pts	Qualification or relegation
1	Budućnost (C)	35	26	6	3	90	29	+61	84	Qualification for the Champions League first qualifying round
2	Petrovac	36	17	9	10	50	37	+13	60	Ineligible for European competitions (Note: Petrovac did not obtain a UEFA license; the Conference League spot was passed to the third-placed team.)
3	Sutjeska	36	14	9	13	40	38	+2	51	Qualification for the Conference League first qualifying round (Note: Dečić qualified for the Conference League first qualifying round as the 2024–25 Montenegrin Cup winners.)
4	Dečić	35	10	17	8	34	31	+3	47	Qualification for the Conference League first qualifying round
5	Mornar	36	12	8	16	40	53	−13	44 (Note: Head-to-head points: Mornar 7, Bokelj 4.)	
6	Bokelj	36	13	5	18	31	50	−19	44	
7	Jedinstvo	36	11	10	15	45	58	−13	43	
8	Arsenal (O)	36	10	12	14	32	47	−15	42	Qualification for the Montenegrin First League play-off
9	Jezero (O)	36	9	12	15	35	44	−9	39	Qualification for the Montenegrin First League play-off
10	Otrant-Olympic (R)	36	9	8	19	43	53	−10	35	Relegation to the Montenegrin Second League

Source: Football Association of Montenegro (in Montenegrin)
Rules for classification: 1) Points; 2) Head-to-head points; 3) Head-to-head goal difference; 4) Head-to-head goals scored; 5) Goal difference; 6) Goals scored; 7) Draw.
(C) Champions; (O) Play-off winners; (R) Relegated

== Results ==
Clubs were scheduled to play each other four times for a total of 36 matches each.

Home \ Away	ARS	BOK	BUD	DEC	JED	JEZ	MOR	OTR	PET	SUT	ARS	BOK	BUD	DEC	JED	JEZ	MOR	OTR	PET	SUT
Arsenal Tivat	—	1–1	0–2	0–0	2–1	0–1	4–0	0–0	1–1	0–1	—	1–0	1–5	1–0	1–1	0–0	1–1	2–1	1–2	1–1
Bokelj	1–2	—	2–1	0–1	1–2	2–0	2–0	1–0	0–1	0–3	1–1	—	0–4	0–1	1–1	2–1	0–2	1–5	0–4	1–2
Budućnost Podgorica	2–1	4–0	—	3–1	4–0	1–1	0–1	1–1	2–1	1–1	5–0	3–1	—	null (Note: Match cancelled due to spectator riots.)	5–2	2–3	3–0	5–1	3–1	2–0
Dečić	1–3	1–2	0–2	—	4–0	1–0	1–0	0–0	1–0	0–0	0–0	1–0	1–1	—	2–2	1–2	2–0	2–2	1–1	0–1
Jedinstvo Bijelo Polje	3–2	0–1	0–2	1–1	—	1–1	1–2	1–0	3–2	2–0	0–1	0–1	1–3	1–1	—	1–0	3–0	2–0	2–1	2–1
Jezero	0–0	0–0	0–2	1–1	1–0	—	2–2	1–0	0–1	0–1	2–0	0–2	3–3	1–1	3–2	—	1–2	2–2	1–1	2–0
Mornar	4–0	1–1	0–2	1–1	1–2	2–0	—	0–1	0–2	2–1	1–0	4–1	1–2	0–2	1–1	0–1	—	1–0	1–1	0–2
Otrant-Olympic	0–2	1–2	0–3	2–2	2–1	3–1	1–2	—	0–1	1–3	4–1	0–1	0–1	2–0	2–2	1–0	6–2	—	2–1	0–2
Petrovac	0–0	1–0	1–4	0–1	3–1	1–1	4–2	3–2	—	1–0	2–0	0–1	3–3	0–0	0–0	2–1	0–2	2–1	—	1–0
Sutjeska Nikšić	1–2	0–2	0–1	1–1	3–0	2–1	1–1	0–0	0–2	—	2–0	1–0	1–3	1–1	3–3	2–1	1–1	2–0	0–3	—

Source: Football Association of Montenegro (in Montenegrin)
Legend: Blue = home team win; Yellow = draw; Red = away team win.
For upcoming matches, an "a" indicates there is an article about the rivalry between the two participants.

== Montenegrin First League play-off ==
The eighth and ninth-placed teams (Arsenal Tivat and Jezero) each faced the third and second-placed teams from the 2024–25 Montenegrin Second League (Lovćen and Rudar) in two-legged ties for the final two places in the 2025–26 Montenegrin First League.

=== Summary ===
Team 1	Agg.	Team 2	1st leg	2nd leg
Lovćen	0–4	Arsenal Tivat	0–0	0–4
Jezero	2–0	Rudar	1–0	1–0

=== Matches ===
30 May 2025
18:00 CEST

Lovćen	0–0	Arsenal Tivat

DG Arena, Podgorica
Referee: Miloš Savović
30 May 2025
20:00 CEST

Jezero	1–0	Rudar
Perović 27'

Berane City Stadium, Berane
Referee: Nikola Dabanović

4 June 2025
18:00 CEST

Arsenal Tivat	4–0	Lovćen
Kovinić 27', 34'; Montenegro 40'; Manojlović 76' (pen.)

Stadion u Parku, Tivat
Referee: Nikola Dabanović
4 June 2025
19:00 CEST

Rudar	0–1	Jezero
		Raičević 58'

Gradski stadion, Pljevlja
Referee: Miloš Bošković

== Statistics ==
=== Top goalscorers ===
As of 6 March 2025

Rank	Player	Club	Goals
1	(Montenegro) Milan Vukotić	Budućnost	9
2	(Somalia) Abdulsamed Abdullahi	Arsenal	8
2	(Montenegro) Žarko Korać	Jedinstvo	8
4	(Montenegro) Vasko Kalezić	Sutjeska	7
4	(Montenegro) Nikola Janjić	Sutjeska	7
4	(Montenegro) Ivan Bojović	Budućnost	7
7	(Montenegro) Boban Đorđević	Mornar	6
7	(Argentina) Diego Facundo Castañeda	Petrovac	6
7	(Montenegro) Dejan Boljević	Petrovac	6
7	(Bosnia and Herzegovina) Adnan Bašić	Petrovac	6

== Attendances ==
#	Club	Average
1	Budućnost	683
2	Sutjeska	678
3	Dečič	593
4	Jedinstvo	488
5	Mornar	394
6	Bokelj	373
7	Tivat	321
8	Petrovac	309
9	Jezero	299
10	Otrant	289

== See also ==
- 2024–25 Montenegrin Second League
