= Montenegrin derby =

Soccer match

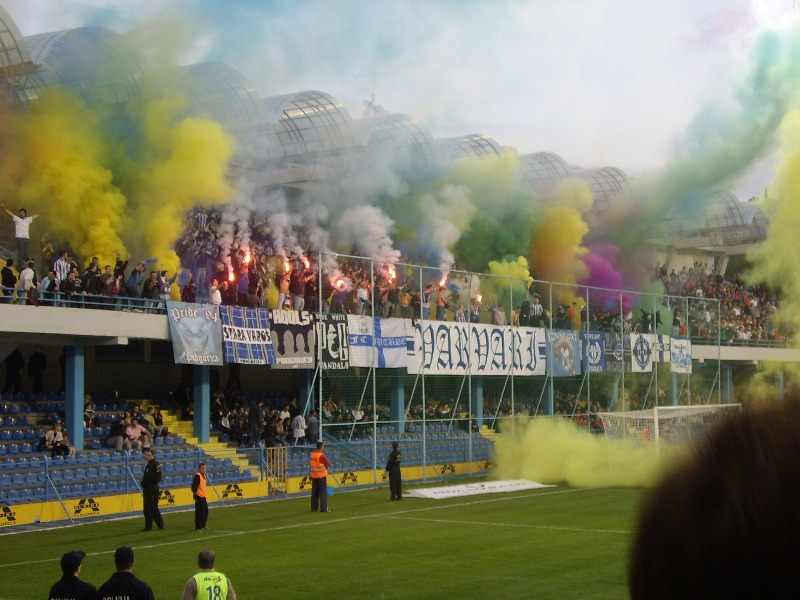
- Montenegrin derby at Podgorica City Stadium in 2007
- Location: Podgorica and Nikšić, Montenegro
- Teams: Budućnost & Sutjeska
- First meeting: 09 October 1932, Nikšić, Kingdom of Yugoslavia
- Latest meeting: Sutjeska 0–2 Budućnost; 2025–26 Montenegrin First League (October 2025)

Statistics
- Total meetings: Total: 129; Official: 129
- All-time series: Official: Budućnost (64); Sutjeska (25)
- Largest victory: Budućnost 7–1 Sutjeska; Montenegrin Championship (28 May 1933)

Location of both teams

The Montenegrin derby (Montenegrin: Црногорски дерби, romanized: Crnogorski derbi) is the main football match in Montenegro, between the teams from the two biggest Montenegrin cities. Rivals are FK Budućnost from Podgorica and FK Sutjeska from Nikšić, two most popular sports societies in Montenegro. The rivalry is present in football and basketball.

Two clubs played their derbies in Montenegrin Championship, First League of SFR Yugoslavia, FR Yugoslavia and Serbia and Montenegro, and today, four times on one season, in Montenegrin First League.

== History ==
FK Budućnost is founded at 1925, and FK Sutjeska at 1927. So, the two teams played their first matches before the Second World War. First matches in official competitions, Budućnost and Sutjeska played in the Montenegrin Football Championship (1922-1940). The first official game was played on 9 October 1932 in Nikšić, and Budućnost won 2–1. During the period before the Second World War, two teams played four official games - FK Budućnost under the name RSK Budućnost and FK Sutjeska under the name SK Hercegovac.
The first derby after the War was held in April 1946, when the two clubs played matches in the Montenegrin Republic League, for promotion to the inaugural season of the Yugoslav First League. Until now, there were 107 official games between Budućnost and Sutjeska.
As a match of main and strongest clubs from two biggest Montenegrin cities, the derby became popular among the citizens from the early history. Some of the highest attendances in Montenegrin football were recorded at the games of Montenegrin Derby. From the 1980s, both clubs have organised supporters groups, which gave to a Montenegrin Derby new and often a violent dimension.

=== Records and statistics ===
==== Head to head record ====
Competition	Played	Budućnost	Draw	Sutjeska	GD
First League	84	41	30	18	137:88
Montenegrin Championship	4	4	0	0	15:3
Lower leagues	26	12	6	8	43:29
National Cup	11	8	3	0	19:7
Totals	125	65	39	26	214:133

GD - Goals of Budućnost first

==== Biggest wins ====
===== Budućnost =====
- Home: Budućnost 7-1 Sutjeska, 1933, Montenegrin Football Championship (1922-1940)
- Away: Sutjeska 0-4 Budućnost, 2016, Montenegrin First League

===== Sutjeska =====
- Home: Sutjeska 5-2 Budućnost, 1963, Yugoslav Second League
- Away: Budućnost 1-4 Sutjeska, 2019, Montenegrin First League

==== Runs ====
- Most consecutive draws: 4 games, 2018-2019

===== Budućnost =====
- Longest unbeaten run: 17 games, 2000-2010
- Longest winning streak: 9 games, 1932-1953
- Longest run without conceded goal: 4 games, 2004-2007

===== Sutjeska =====
- Longest unbeaten run: 9 games, 2017-2019
- Longest winning streak: 3 games, 2017; 2018
- Longest run without conceded goal: 3 games, 1969-1971, 2017

==== Record by venue ====
Town	Played	Budućnost	Draw	Sutjeska
Podgorica	64	38	18	8
Nikšić	65	26	21	18
Totals	129	64	39	26

==== Attendance ====
- Highest / Podgorica: 16,000, Budućnost - Sutjeska 3:0, Stadion pod Goricom, 1974
- Lowest / Podgorica: 700, Budućnost - Sutjeska 1:1, Stadion pod Goricom, 2018
- Highest / Nikšić: 12,000, Sutjeska - Budućnost 1:3, Stadion kraj Bistrice, 1975
- Lowest / Nikšić: 800, Sutjeska - Budućnost 1:2, Stadion kraj Bistrice, 2022

==== Attendance by venue ====
Town	Venue	Host	Avg	Overall	M	H	L
Nikšić	Stadion kraj Bistrice	Sutjeska	4,248	241,400	56	12,000	800
Podgorica	Stadion pod Goricom	Budućnost	4,080	225,200	53	16,000	700
Podgorica	Cvijetni Brijeg	Budućnost	1,000	1,000	1	1,000	1,000

M = Number of matches (only matches with spectators counted); H = Highest attendance; L = Lowest attendance; Games played without spectators not included

== Official games ==
During the history, through official competitions, Budućnost and Sutjeska played 104 official matches.

Year	Competition	Home	Visitors	Result	Attendance
1932	Montenegrin Championship	Sutjeska	Budućnost	1:2	W/A
1933	Montenegrin Championship	Budućnost	Sutjeska	7:1	W/A
1934	Montenegrin Championship	Budućnost	Sutjeska	2:0	W/A
1934	Montenegrin Championship	Sutjeska	Budućnost	1:4	W/A
1946	Montenegrin Republic League	Sutjeska	Budućnost	0:3	4,000
1946	Montenegrin Republic League	Budućnost	Sutjeska	7:2	2,500
1950	Yugoslav Cup	Sutjeska	Budućnost	0:2	4,000
1952	Montenegrin Republic League	Budućnost	Sutjeska	3:0	5,000
1952	Montenegrin Republic League	Sutjeska	Budućnost	1:2	3,000
1953	Montenegrin Republic League	Budućnost	Sutjeska	1:2	4,000
1953	Montenegrin Republic League	Sutjeska	Budućnost	1:2	5,000
1958	Yugoslav Cup	Budućnost	Sutjeska	3:2	2,000
1960	Yugoslav Second League	Sutjeska	Budućnost	0:0	4,500
1961	Yugoslav Second League	Budućnost	Sutjeska	1:2	5,000
1961	Yugoslav Second League	Budućnost	Sutjeska	1:0	5,000
1962	Yugoslav Second League	Sutjeska	Budućnost	1:0	8,000
1963	Yugoslav Second League	Sutjeska	Budućnost	5:2	7,000
1964	Yugoslav Second League	Budućnost	Sutjeska	1:0	12,000
1964	Yugoslav Cup	Sutjeska	Budućnost	2:3	5,000
1965	Yugoslav Second League	Budućnost	Sutjeska	0:3	5,000
1966	Yugoslav Second League	Sutjeska	Budućnost	3:2	7,000
1967	Yugoslav Second League	Budućnost	Sutjeska	3:0	6,000
1968	Yugoslav Second League	Sutjeska	Budućnost	3:1	7,000
1968	Yugoslav Second League	Sutjeska	Budućnost	1:1	9,000
1969	Yugoslav Second League	Budućnost	Sutjeska	1:0	10,000
1969	Yugoslav Second League	Budućnost	Sutjeska	0:0	8,000
1970	Yugoslav Second League	Sutjeska	Budućnost	1:0	10,000
1970	Yugoslav Second League	Budućnost	Sutjeska	0:0	7,000
1971	Yugoslav Second League	Sutjeska	Budućnost	1:1	11,000
1973	Yugoslav Second League	Budućnost	Sutjeska	3:0	8,000
1974	Yugoslav Second League	Sutjeska	Budućnost	1:1	6,000
1974	Yugoslav Second League	Budućnost	Sutjeska	3:0	16,000
1975	Yugoslav Second League	Sutjeska	Budućnost	1:3	12,000
1984	Yugoslav First League	Budućnost	Sutjeska	2:1	10,000
1985	Yugoslav First League	Sutjeska	Budućnost	0:0	10,000
1985	Yugoslav First League	Budućnost	Sutjeska	2:1	8,000
1986	Yugoslav First League	Sutjeska	Budućnost	5:5	7,000
1986	Yugoslav First League	Budućnost	Sutjeska	1:1	10,000
1987	Yugoslav First League	Sutjeska	Budućnost	2:0	8,000
1987	Yugoslav First League	Sutjeska	Budućnost	1:1	5,000
1988	Yugoslav First League	Budućnost	Sutjeska	2:2	6,000
1991	Yugoslav First League	Budućnost	Sutjeska	1:0	3,000
1992	Yugoslav First League	Sutjeska	Budućnost	0:0	5,000
1992	FRY First League	Sutjeska	Budućnost	3:1	1,500
1993	FRY First League	Budućnost	Sutjeska	2:1	1,000
1994	FRY First League	Sutjeska	Budućnost	0:2	2,000
1994	FRY First League	Budućnost	Sutjeska	3:0	2,500
1995	FRY First League	Sutjeska	Budućnost	1:0	1,500
1995	FRY First League	Budućnost	Sutjeska	5:1	2,000
1999	FRY First League	Sutjeska	Budućnost	1:0	3,000
2000	FRY First League	Budućnost	Sutjeska	0:0	4,000
2000	FRY First League	Sutjeska	Budućnost	1:1	3,000
2001	FRY First League	Budućnost	Sutjeska	4:3	2,000
2004	SCG First League	Sutjeska	Budućnost	0:1	4,000
2005	SCG First League	Budućnost	Sutjeska	1:0	5,000
2006	Montenegrin First League	Budućnost	Sutjeska	1:0	1,000
2007	Montenegrin First League	Sutjeska	Budućnost	0:0	3,000
2007	Montenegrin First League	Sutjeska	Budućnost	1:1	3,000
2007	Montenegrin First League	Sutjeska	Budućnost	1:1	4,000
2007	Montenegrin First League	Budućnost	Sutjeska	2:0	2,000
2008	Montenegrin First League	Budućnost	Sutjeska	4:0	5,000
2008	Montenegrin First League	Budućnost	Sutjeska	3:2	4,000
2009	Montenegrin First League	Sutjeska	Budućnost	0:0	5,000
2009	Montenegrin First League	Budućnost	Sutjeska	1:1	5,000
2009	Montenegrin Cup	Budućnost	Sutjeska	1:1	2,500
2009	Montenegrin Cup	Sutjeska	Budućnost	0:1	3,000
2009	Montenegrin First League	Budućnost	Sutjeska	2:1	3,500
2010	Montenegrin First League	Sutjeska	Budućnost	3:1	5,000
2010	Montenegrin First League	Sutjeska	Budućnost	2:0	3,000
2010	Montenegrin First League	Budućnost	Sutjeska	2:1	1,500
2011	Montenegrin First League	Sutjeska	Budućnost	1:2	3,500
2011	Montenegrin First League	Budućnost	Sutjeska	3:0	2,000
2011	Montenegrin First League	Budućnost	Sutjeska	2:0	3,000
2012	Montenegrin First League	Sutjeska	Budućnost	2:3	4,000
2012	Montenegrin First League	Budućnost	Sutjeska	3:0	1,500
2012	Montenegrin First League	Sutjeska	Budućnost	1:0	3,000
2012	Montenegrin First League	Budućnost	Sutjeska	2:0	2,500
2013	Montenegrin First League	Sutjeska	Budućnost	1:3	7,000
2013	Montenegrin First League	Budućnost	Sutjeska	0:0	W/A
2013	Montenegrin First League	Sutjeska	Budućnost	1:1	4,000
2014	Montenegrin First League	Sutjeska	Budućnost	0:1	4,500
2014	Montenegrin First League	Budućnost	Sutjeska	1:2	3,000
2015	Montenegrin First League	Sutjeska	Budućnost	0:3	3,500
2015	Montenegrin First League	Budućnost	Sutjeska	1:1	1,500
2015	Montenegrin First League	Sutjeska	Budućnost	0:0	2,000
2016	Montenegrin First League	Budućnost	Sutjeska	0:0	4,000
2016	Montenegrin First League	Sutjeska	Budućnost	0:4	2,000
2016	Montenegrin First League	Sutjeska	Budućnost	1:1	3,000
2017	Montenegrin First League	Budućnost	Sutjeska	4:2	4,000
2017	Montenegrin First League	Sutjeska	Budućnost	1:0	3,000
2017	Montenegrin First League	Sutjeska	Budućnost	1:0	2,000
2017	Montenegrin First League	Sutjeska	Budućnost	1:0	3,000
2017	Montenegrin Cup	Budućnost	Sutjeska	2:0	2,500
2017	Montenegrin Cup	Sutjeska	Budućnost	0:1	2,500
2017	Montenegrin First League	Budućnost	Sutjeska	3:1	1,200
2018	Montenegrin First League	Sutjeska	Budućnost	3:2	1,500
2018	Montenegrin First League	Budućnost	Sutjeska	2:3	1,000
2018	Montenegrin First League	Sutjeska	Budućnost	2:1	1,800
2018	Montenegrin First League	Budućnost	Sutjeska	1:1	700
2019	Montenegrin First League	Sutjeska	Budućnost	2:2	3,500
2019	Montenegrin Cup	Budućnost	Sutjeska	0:0	2,000
2019	Montenegrin Cup	Sutjeska	Budućnost	1:1	3,000
2019	Montenegrin First League	Budućnost	Sutjeska	0:2	2,000
2019	Montenegrin First League	Budućnost	Sutjeska	1:4	2,500
2019	Montenegrin First League	Sutjeska	Budućnost	0:2	3,000
2020	Montenegrin First League	Budućnost	Sutjeska	2:0	W/A
2020	Montenegrin First League	Budućnost	Sutjeska	1:0	W/A
2020	Montenegrin First League	Sutjeska	Budućnost	0:1	W/A
2021	Montenegrin First League	Budućnost	Sutjeska	1:1	W/A
2021	Montenegrin First League	Sutjeska	Budućnost	0:1	W/A
2021	Montenegrin First League	Sutjeska	Budućnost	1:0	1,000
2021	Montenegrin First League	Budućnost	Sutjeska	3:3	3,000
2022	Montenegrin First League	Sutjeska	Budućnost	2:2	1,500
2022	Montenegrin Cup	Budućnost	Sutjeska	3:0	2,500
2022	Montenegrin Cup	Sutjeska	Budućnost	1:2	800
2022	Montenegrin First League	Budućnost	Sutjeska	4:2	1,200
2022	Montenegrin First League	Budućnost	Sutjeska	2:0	3,000
2022	Montenegrin First League	Sutjeska	Budućnost	0:1	1,000
2022	Montenegrin First League	Budućnost	Sutjeska	1:1	W/A
2023	Montenegrin First League	Sutjeska	Budućnost	2:2	W/A
2023	Montenegrin First League	Sutjeska	Budućnost	1:2	W/A
2023	Montenegrin First League	Budućnost	Sutjeska	1:0	1,800
2024	Montenegrin First League	Sutjeska	Budućnost	1:1	1,100
2024	Montenegrin First League	Budućnost	Sutjeska	2:2	4,500
2024	Montenegrin First League	Budućnost	Sutjeska	1:1	1,000
2024	Montenegrin First League	Sutjeska	Budućnost	0:1	1,800
2025	Montenegrin First League	Budućnost	Sutjeska	2:0	2,500
2025	Montenegrin First League	Sutjeska	Budućnost	1:3	2,100
2025	Montenegrin First League	Budućnost	Sutjeska	0:1	1,500
2025	Montenegrin First League	Sutjeska	Budućnost	0:2	1,000

== Head-to-head league results ==
Budućnost and Sutjeska were a part of Montenegrin football competitions since its early days. So, the teams played in the same competition levels during most of the time. Before the World War II, football competitions in Montenegro existed as an elimination tournaments, so the very first leagues were organized since 1946. From that period, Budućnost and Sutjeska played in Yugoslav football system (1946-2006) and in Montenegrin First League (Prva CFL) since 2006.

=== Head-to-head ranking in Yugoslav football system (1946-2006) ===
Two teams often played in same competition levels during the era of SFR Yugoslavia, FR Yugoslavia and Federation of Serbia and Montenegro. They played together in first, second and third-tier competitions. Below are the final placements by both teams on every season when Budućnost and Sutjeska played in the same league.

P.	46	51	52	61	62	64	66	68	69	70	71	74	75	85	86	87	88	92	93	94	95	97	98	00	01	05
1st	1	1	1		1	1	1		1	1	1		1													
2nd		2		2					2	2	2		2													
3rd	3																									
4th			4					4																		
5th																								5		
6th												6								6						6
7th				7	7	7										7									7	
8th																							8			
9th							9							9			9									
10th															10	10			10			10				
11th												11									11					
12th																		12						12		
13th																		13								
14th															14											
15th														15											15	15
16th								16											16							
17th																	17									
18th																				18						
19th																					19					
20th																						20				
21st																							21			
22nd																										

Key

First League
Second League
Third League

Budućnost
Sutjeska

=== Head-to-head ranking in Prva CFL (2006-) ===
Since establishing of Prva CFL, Budućnost and Sutjeska played every single season in competition. Below are the final placements by both teams from 2006 to 2007 edition until today.

P.	07	08	09	10	11	12	13	14	15	16	17	18	19	20	21	22	23	24	25	26
1st		1				1	1	1			1	1	1	1	1	1	1		1	1
2nd	2		2	2	2		2		2	2		2	2	2	2	2	2	2		
3rd			3						3										3	
4th								4			4							4		
5th										5										5
6th																				
7th				7																
8th	8					8														
9th																				
10th																				
11th		11			11							—N/a								
12th												—N/a								

Key

Budućnost
Sutjeska

== Honours ==
=== FK Budućnost ===
National Championships – 5

- Montenegrin First League:
  - Winners (7): 2007–08, 2011–12, 2016–17, 2019–20, 2020–21, 2022–23, 2024–25
  - Runners-up (8): 2006–07, 2008–09, 2009–10, 2010–11, 2012–13, 2015–16, 2017–18, 2021–22,

National Cups – 4

- Yugoslav Cup:
  - Runners-up (2): 1964–65, 1976–77
- Montenegrin Cup:
  - Winners (5): 2012–13, 2018–19, 2020–21, 2021–22, 2023–24
  - Runners-up (3): 2007–08, 2009–10, 2015–16

Championships (1922-1940) – 4

- Montenegrin Championship (1922-1940)
  - Winners (4): 1932, spring 1933, autumn 1933, 1934
  - Runners-up (2): 1931, 1935

International – 1

- Intertoto Cup
  - Group winners (1): 1981
- Balkans Cup:
  - Runners-up (1): 1990–91

=== FK Sutjeska ===
National Championships – 5

- Montenegrin First League:
  - Winners (5): 2012–13, 2013–14, 2017–18, 2018–19, 2021–22
  - Runners-up (3): 2014–15, 2019–20, 2020–21

National Cups – 1

- Montenegrin Cup:
  - Winners (1): 2016–17
  - Runners-up (1): 2006–07

Championships (1922-1940)

- Montenegrin Championship (1922-1940)
  - Runners-up (1): 1929

== Supporters ==
One of the crucial aspects of the Montenegrin Derby are the supporters. The supporters of Budućnost are named Varvari (Barbarians) while the supporters of Sutjeska are Vojvode (The Dukes). Rivalry of ultras from Podgorica and Nikšić is presented on the football matches since their foundation. During recent history, there is strong ultras rivalry at the basketball matches, too.

=== Varvari Podgorica ===
Buducnost fans are known as Varvari (Barbarians), a group founded in 1987. The group's traditional colours are blue and white, which are also the colours of all the Budućnost sports clubs. For FK Budućnost Podgorica home games, Varvari occupy the northern stand (Sjever) of the Podgorica city stadium. They also have a reserved stand at the Morača Sports Center, as supporters of KK Buducnost basketball club.

=== Vojvode Nikšić ===
"The Dukes" (Vojvode) is the popular name for the most ardent Sutjeska supporters. They have been established as in 1988 in Nikšić and today constitute one of the most numerous groups of supporters in Montenegro. Their place is in the eastern stand, and they traditionally follow all the matches of all sports that compete under the Sutjeska name, both home and away matches.

== See also ==
- Football in Montenegro
- Montenegrin First League
- FK Budućnost Podgorica
- FK Sutjeska Nikšić
