= 2023–24 Montenegrin Cup =

Tournament details
- Country: Montenegro
- Teams: 16

Final positions
- Champions: Budućnost (5th title)
- Runners-up: Jezero

Tournament statistics
- Matches played: 16
- Goals scored: 44 (2.75 per match)

The 2023–24 Montenegrin Cup was the 18th edition of the knockout football tournament in Montenegro. It began on 30 August 2023. The winners qualified for the first qualifying round of the 2024–25 UEFA Conference League. Sutjeska were the defending champions.

Budućnost won the cup on 30 May 2024 (their fifth Montenegrin Cup win), defeating Jezero 2–1 in the final.

== First round ==
The ten clubs from the 2023–24 Montenegrin First League and six clubs from the 2023–24 Montenegrin Second League entered the first round. The matches were played on 30 August 2023.

=== Summary ===
Team 1	Score	Team 2
Jezero	1–0	Arsenal
Jedinstvo	0–1	Mornar
Dečić	1–0	Sutjeska
Iskra	1–2	Rudar
Mladost DG	1–2	Bokelj
Petrovac	3–0	Grbalj
Kom	4–0	Berane
Budućnost	4–0	Podgorica

=== Matches ===
30 August 2023	Jezero	1–0	Arsenal	Berane
19:00 CEST	Barreto 87'	Report		Stadium: Berane City Stadium; Attendance: 100; Referee: Dejan Marković

30 August 2023	Jedinstvo	0–1	Mornar	Bijelo Polje
19:00 CEST		Report	Račić 19'	Stadium: Gradski stadion Attendance: 600; Referee: Miloš Bošković

30 August 2023	Dečić	1–0	Sutjeska	Podgorica
20:00 CEST	Božović 40'	Report		Stadium: DG Arena; Attendance: 800; Referee: Radoje Pajović

30 August 2023	Iskra	1–2	Rudar	Danilovgrad
20:00 CEST	Gajić 88'	Report	Simić 21'; Sentoku 73'	Stadium: Braća Velašević Stadium; Attendance: 300; Referee: Mladen Knežević

30 August 2023	Mladost DG	1–2	Bokelj	Podgorica
20:00 CEST	Maraš 15'	Report	Musah 11'; Mirković 43'	Stadium: Kamp FSCG; Attendance: 200; Referee: Vladimir Bjelica

30 August 2023	Petrovac	3–0	Grbalj	Petrovac
20:00 CEST	Adžović 14'; Babić 61', 67'	Report		Stadium: Stadion Mitar Mićo Goliš; Attendance: 300; Referee: Manojlo Sekulić

30 August 2023	Kom	4–0	Berane	Podgorica
20:00 CEST	Vukčević 24'; Barac 56'; Perišić 81'; Radonjić 87'	Report		Stadium: Stadion Zlatica; Attendance: 110; Referee: Miloš Laličić

30 August 2023	Budućnost	4–0	Podgorica	Podgorica
20:00 CEST	Orahovac 11'; Grbić 23'; Sekulić 40', 90+1'	Report		Stadium: Podgorica City Stadium; Attendance: 200; Referee: Nikola Cvijović

== Quarter-finals ==
The eight first round winners entered the quarter-finals. The matches were played on 1 October 2023.

=== Summary ===
Team 1	Score	Team 2
Jezero	6–1	Kom
Dečić	2–1	Petrovac
Bokelj	1–1 (4–5 p)	Rudar
Mornar	2–2 (2–4 p)	Budućnost

=== Matches ===
1 November 2023	Jezero	6–1	Kom	Berane
13:30 CET	Redžepagić 4'; Tošković 12'; Pavlićević 46'; Šimun 52'; Julević 71'; Aranda 82'	Report	Perišić 10'	Stadium: Berane City Stadium; Attendance: 100; Referee: Dejan Marković

1 November 2023	Dečić	2–1	Petrovac	Podgorica
15:00 CET	Božović 45+1' (pen.); Lulgjuraj 90+2'	Report	Adžović 51'	Stadium: Camp FSCG; Attendance: 250; Referee: Branko Odalović

1 November 2023	Bokelj	1–1 (4–5 p)	Rudar	Kotor
15:00 CET	Poček 65'	Report	Kalezić 22' (pen.)	Stadium: Stadion pod Vrmcem; Attendance: 200; Referee: Nikola Cvijović

1 November 2023	Mornar	2–2 (2–4 p)	Budućnost	Bar
17:30 CET	Ondong-Mba 4', 12'	Report	Grbić 41'; Adžić 64'	Stadium: Topolica; Attendance: 500; Referee: Savo Vujović

== Semi-finals ==
The eight first round winners entered the quarter-finals. The semi-finals will be played from 17 April to 8 May 2024.

=== Summary ===
Team 1	Agg.	Team 2	1st leg	2nd leg
Dečić	0–1	Jezero	0–0	0–1
Budućnost	4–1	Rudar	4–1	0–0

=== First legs ===
17 April 2024	Dečić	0–0	Jezero	Podgorica
18:00 CEST		Report		Stadium: Camp FSCG; Attendance: 500; Referee: Dalibor Vujisić

17 April 2024	Budućnost	4–1	Rudar	Podgorica
18:00 CEST	Mujan 9', 30'; Ivanović 40'; Mirković 86'	Report	Zečević 69'	Stadium: Podgorica City Stadium; Attendance: 400; Referee: Miloš Bešović

=== Second legs ===
8 May 2024	Jezero	1–0 (1–0 agg.)	Dečić	Berane
16:00 CEST	Redžepagić 54'	Report		Stadium: Berane City Stadium; Attendance: 2,000; Referee: Branko Odalović

8 May 2024	Rudar	0–0 (1–4 agg.)	Budućnost	Pljevlja
16:00 CEST		Report		Stadium: Gradski stadion Attendance: 200; Referee: Miloš Bošković

== Final ==
The final was held between the two semi-final winners.

30 May 2024
20:30 CEST

Jezero	1–2	Budućnost
Redžepagić 3'	Report	Vukotić 51'; Despotović 86'

Podgorica City Stadium, Podgorica
Attendance: 5,000
Referee: Miloš Bošković

== See also ==
- Montenegrin Cup
- Montenegrin First League
