= 2023–24 Montenegrin First League =

Montenegrin First League
- Season: 2023–24
- Dates: 23 July 2023 – 25 May 2024
- Champions: Dečić; 1st title
- Relegated: Mladost DG; Rudar
- Champions League: Dečić
- Conference League: Budućnost; Mornar
- Matches: 175
- Goals: 413 (2.36 per match)
- Top goalscorer: Žarko Korać (16 goals)
- Biggest home win: Dečić 4–1 Mladost DG; 21 October 2023
- Biggest away win: Rudar 0–4 Budućnost; 5 August 2023; Dečić 0–4 Sutjeska; 17 September 2023
- Highest scoring: Mornar 4–3 Jedinstvo; 26 August 2023; Jedinstvo 3–4 Mornar; 4 May 2024
- All statistics correct as of 10 March 2024.

The 2023–24 Montenegrin First League (also known as 1.CFL) was the 18th season of the first tier association football in the country of Montenegro. The season began on 23 July 2023 and ended on 25 May 2024.

The winners (Dečić) qualified for the 2024–25 UEFA Champions League first qualifying round. The runners-up (Mornar) and 2023–24 Montenegrin Cup winners (Budućnost) qualified for the 2024–25 UEFA Conference League first qualifying round. The eighth and ninth-placed teams (Jedinstvo and Mladost DG) qualified for the Montenegrin First League play-off, with Jedinstvo winning and retaining their place in the league, and Mladost DG losing and being relegated to the 2024–25 Montenegrin Second League alongside the bottom-placed team (Rudar).

== Teams ==
The league consisted of ten teams; the top nine teams from the previous season and one team promoted from the Montenegrin Second League. Mladost DG were promoted as champions of the 2022–23 Montenegrin Second League (replacing the bottom-placed 2022–23 Montenegrin First League team Iskra), marking their debut in the Montenegrin First League. Budućnost entered the season as defending champions, having won the league in the previous season.

2023–24 clubs

=== Stadiums and locations ===
Team	City	Stadium	Capacity
Arsenal	Tivat	Stadion u Parku	2,000
Budućnost	Podgorica	Stadion pod Goricom	15,230
Dečić	Tuzi	Stadion Tuško Polje	2,000
Jedinstvo	Bijelo Polje	Gradski stadion	5,000
Jezero	Plav	Stadion Pod Racinom	2,500
Mladost DG	Podgorica	DG Arena	4,300
Mornar	Bar	Stadion Topolica	2,500
Petrovac	Petrovac	Stadion Mitar Mićo Goliš	1,630
Rudar	Pljevlja	Stadion pod Golubinjom	5,140
Sutjeska	Nikšić	Stadion kraj Bistrice	5,214

=== Personnel and kits ===
Note: Flags indicate national team as has been defined under FIFA eligibility rules. Players may hold more than one non-FIFA nationality.

Team	Coach	Captain	Kit manufacturer	Shirt sponsor
Arsenal	(Montenegro) Zoran Tripković	(Montenegro) Ćetko Manojlović	(Montenegro) Lmp	Porto Montenegro
Budućnost	(Serbia) Mladen Milinković	(Montenegro) Vasilije Terzić	(Germany) Adidas	Savana
Dečić	(Montenegro) Milorad Peković	(Montenegro) Jonathan Dreshaj	(Serbia) Seven	Castellana
Jedinstvo	(Montenegro) Vuko Bogavac	(Montenegro) Momčilo Dulović	(Serbia) NAAI	Hotel Splendid
Jezero	(Montenegro) Ivan Brnović	(Montenegro) Edis Redžepagić	(Italy) Macron	Samont
Mladost DG	(Montenegro) Marko Šćepanović	(Montenegro) Željko Krstović	(Spain) Luanvi	Lob bet
Mornar	(Montenegro) Zoran Đurašković	(Montenegro) Aleksandar Vujačić	(Serbia) Seven	Municipality of Bar
Petrovac	(Montenegro) Dušan Ivanović	(Montenegro) Zoran Mikijelj	(Italy) Macron	Municipality of Budva
Rudar	(Montenegro) Nedeljko Vlahović	(Montenegro) Aleksa Golubović	(Germany) Adidas	Elektroprivreda Crne Gore
Sutjeska	(Montenegro) Nenad Brnović	(Montenegro) Vladan Giljen	(Spain) Joma	Intersport

== League table ==
Pos	Team	Pld	W	D	L	GF	GA	GD	Pts	Qualification or relegation
1	Dečić (C)	36	20	10	6	55	27	+28	70	Qualification for the Champions League first qualifying round
2	Mornar	36	17	13	6	45	32	+13	64	Qualification for the Conference League first qualifying round (Note: Budućnost qualified for the Conference League first qualifying round by winning the 2023–24 Montenegrin Cup.)
3	Budućnost	36	17	10	9	66	43	+23	61	Qualification for the Conference League first qualifying round
4	Sutjeska	36	13	14	9	46	36	+10	53	
5	Jezero	36	14	9	13	41	38	+3	51	
6	Petrovac	36	11	15	10	42	40	+2	48	
7	Arsenal	36	9	15	12	43	58	−15	42	
8	Jedinstvo (O)	36	8	11	17	43	56	−13	35	Qualification for the Montenegrin First League play-off
9	Mladost DG (R)	36	9	7	20	37	59	−22	34	Qualification for the Montenegrin First League play-off
10	Rudar (R)	36	7	6	23	25	54	−29	27	Relegation to the Montenegrin Second League

Source: Football Association of Montenegro (in Montenegrin)
Rules for classification: 1) Points; 2) Head-to-head points; 3) Head-to-head goal difference; 4) Head-to-head goals scored; 5) Goal difference; 6) Goals scored; 7) Draw.
(C) Champions; (O) Play-off winners; (R) Relegated

== Results ==
Clubs were scheduled to play each other four times for a total of 36 matches each.

Home \ Away	ARS	BUD	DEČ	JED	JEZ	MDG	MOR	PET	RUD	SUT	ARS	BUD	DEČ	JED	JEZ	MDG	MOR	PET	RUD	SUT
Arsenal	—	1–1	0–1	2–2	2–2	0–2	2–2	2–2	2–0	1–1	—	0–4	0–2	1–1	3–1	3–1	1–2	1–1	4–2	1–0
Budućnost	2–0	—	1–1	3–2	1–1	2–2	4–3	2–1	2–0	1–0	6–0	—	2–2	2–0	0–1	1–2	0–1	2–0	3–1	2–2
Dečić	0–1	2–0	—	2–1	0–0	4–1	3–1	1–2	0–1	0–4	3–1	1–1	—	3–1	2–0	2–0	0–1	1–1	3–1	0–0
Jedinstvo	3–2	1–4	0–1	—	2–3	2–1	1–1	1–1	1–0	0–0	1–1	1–2	0–2	—	2–0	0–0	3–4	4–2	1–0	0–1
Jezero	1–1	1–3	0–0	1–0	—	2–0	0–1	2–0	4–1	0–1	4–0	3–1	1–1	0–3	—	0–1	3–1	0–2	2–1	0–0
Mladost DG	2–1	2–1	0–2	2–0	1–2	—	1–1	0–2	0–1	1–1	1–2	1–3	0–3	1–2	0–1	—	1–2	0–0	1–0	3–2
Mornar	0–1	0–0	0–1	4–3	2–1	2–1	—	0–0	2–1	1–1	0–0	1–0	1–1	0–0	1–0	5–1	—	1–0	3–0	1–0
Petrovac	1–1	2–2	2–3	1–1	0–0	1–0	0–0	—	2–0	1–1	2–2	3–1	2–1	1–0	2–1	3–2	0–0	—	1–1	1–2
Rudar	0–1	0–4	0–1	2–2	0–1	0–0	0–0	1–0	—	1–2	2–0	3–0	0–4	1–1	0–1	1–2	0–0	1–0	—	2–1
Sutjeska	2–2	1–2	1–1	2–0	1–1	3–3	0–1	3–2	1–0	—	1–1	1–1	0–1	3–1	2–1	2–1	2–0	0–1	2–1	—

Source: Football Association of Montenegro (in Montenegrin)
Legend: Blue = home team win; Yellow = draw; Red = away team win.
For upcoming matches, an "a" indicates there is an article about the rivalry between the two participants.

== Montenegrin First League play-off ==
The eighth and ninth-placed teams (Jedinstvo and Mladost DG) each faced the third and second-placed teams from the 2023–24 Montenegrin Second League (Podgorica and Otrant-Olympic) in two-legged ties for the final two places in the 2024–25 Montenegrin First League.

=== Summary ===
Team 1	Agg.	Team 2	1st leg	2nd leg
Otrant-Olympic	3–2	Mladost DG	1–0	2–2
Podgorica	1–3	Jedinstvo	1–3	0–0

=== Matches ===
31 May 2024
16:30 CEST

Otrant-Olympic	1–0	Mladost DG
Nishimura 74'	Report

Stadion Olympic, Ulcinj
Attendance: 1,200
Referee: Nikola Dabanović
4 June 2024
20:00 CEST

Mladost DG	2–2	Otrant-Olympic
Vuković 3'; Pejović 77'	Report	Škrelja 21'; Rexhoviq 59'

DG Arena, Podgorica
Attendance: 1,500
Referee: Miloš Savović

31 May 2024
18:00 CEST

Podgorica	1–3	Jedinstvo
Komiya 15'	Report	Kolić 18', 86'; de Souza 74'

DG Arena, Podgorica
Attendance: 700
Referee: Miloš Savović
4 June 2024
19:00 CEST

Jedinstvo	0–0	Podgorica
	Report

Gradski stadion, Bijelo Polje
Attendance: 650
Referee: Nikola Dabanović

== Statistics ==
=== Top goalscorers ===
As of 12 May 2024

Rank	Player	Club	Goals
1	(Montenegro) Žarko Korać	Jedinstvo	16
2	(Montenegro) Aleksa Maraš	Mladost DG	14
3	(Montenegro) Oliver Sarkic	Dečić	11
3	(Serbia) Slobodan Babić	Petrovac	11
5	(Montenegro) Boban Đorđević	Arsenal	10
6	(Serbia) Đorđe Despotović	Budućnost	9
6	(Serbia) Bojan Matić	Dečić	9
6	(Japan) Naoaki Senaga	Jezero	9

== Attendances ==
#	Football club	Average attendance
1	FK Budućnost Podgorica	1,047
2	Jedinstvo	569
3	FK Mornar	528
4	OFK Petrovac	392
5	FK Dečić	364
6	FK Arsenal Tivat	342
7	FK Sutjeska Nikšić	324
8	FK Rudar Pljevlja	319
9	FK Jezero	244
10	Mladost DG	226

== See also ==
- Montenegrin First League
