= Veselin Bojić =

Montenegrin footballer (born 1977)

Personal information
- Full name: Veselin Bojić
- Date of birth: 16 June 1977 (age 49)
- Place of birth: Nikšić, SR Montenegro, SFR Yugoslavia
- Height: 1.91 m (6 ft 3 in)
- Position: Centre-back

Senior career*
Years	Team	Apps	(Gls)
1994–1998	Sutjeska Nikšić		
1998–2000	Obilić		
2000–2001	Milicionar		
2001–2005	Sutjeska Nikšić		
2005–2006	Pobeda		
2006–2007	Petrovac		
2007–2008	Mogren		
2008–2009	Grbalj		
2009–2011	Rudar Pljevlja	52	(10)
2011–2012	Čelik Nikšić		
2012–2013	Mogren	24	(1)
2014	Berane		
- * Club domestic league appearances and goals

Veselin Bojić (Serbian Cyrillic: Веселин Бојић; born 16 June 1977) is a Montenegrin retired footballer who played as a centre-back.

== Playing career ==
After spending four years at Sutjeska Nikšić, Bojić signed with Obilić in 1998. After playing two years for Obilić, he switched to city rivals Milicionar at the start of the 2000–01 season.

He has also featured for Mogren on two different occasions.

== Honours ==
Rudar Pljevlja

- Montenegrin First League: 2009–10
- Montenegrin Cup: 2009–10

Čelik Nikšić

- Montenegrin Second League: 2011–12
- Montenegrin Cup: 2012
