= 2022–23 Montenegrin First League =

Montenegrin First League
- Season: 2022–23
- Dates: 23 July 2022 – 25 May 2023
- Champions: Budućnost; 6th title
- Relegated: Iskra
- Champions League: Budućnost
- Europa Conference League: Sutjeska; Arsenal
- Matches: 180
- Goals: 446 (2.48 per match)
- Top goalscorer: Tyrone Conraad (26 goals)
- Biggest home win: Sutjeska 5–0 Jedinstvo (1 October 2022)
- Biggest away win: Arsenal 0–4 Budućnost (28 August 2022); Petrovac 0–4 Sutjeska (10 September 2022); Jedinstvo 0–4 Sutjeska (7 December 2022)
- Highest scoring: Budućnost 4–4 Petrovac (9 April 2023)

The 2022–23 Montenegrin First League was the 17th season of the first tier association football in the country of Montenegro. The season began on 23 July 2022 and ended on 25 May 2023. The winners of the league qualified for a place in the 2023–24 UEFA Champions League.

Sutjeska were the defending champions having won the league in the previous season.

== Teams ==
2022–23 clubs

FK Podgorica (relegated after three years in the top flight) and Zeta (never relegated from the top flight)(relegated after sixteen years in the top flight) were relegated after finishing tenth in the previous season. Jedinstvo (promoted after a five-year absence) and Arsenal (promoted for the first time in its history) will replace them in the league after earning promotion from the Montenegrin Second League as league champions in the previous season.

=== Stadiums and locations ===
| Team | City | Stadium | Capacity |
|---|---|---|---|
| Arsenal | Tivat | Stadion u Parku | 2,000 |
| Budućnost | Podgorica | Stadion pod Goricom | 15,230 |
| Dečić | Tuzi | Stadion Tuško Polje | 2,000 |
| Iskra | Danilovgrad | Braća Velašević Stadium | 2,500 |
| Jedinstvo | Bijelo Polje | Gradski stadion | 5,000 |
| Jezero | Plav | Stadion Pod Racinom | 2,500 |
| Mornar | Bar | Stadion Topolica | 2,500 |
| Petrovac | Petrovac | Stadion Mitar Mićo Goliš | 1,630 |
| Rudar | Pljevlja | Stadion pod Golubinjom | 5,140 |
| Sutjeska | Nikšić | Stadion kraj Bistrice | 5,214 |

=== Personnel and kits ===
Note: Flags indicate national team as has been defined under FIFA eligibility rules. Players may hold more than one non-FIFA nationality.

| Team | Coach | Captain | Kit manufacturer | Shirt sponsor |
|---|---|---|---|---|
| Arsenal | (Montenegro) Radislav Dragićević | (Montenegro) Ćetko Manojlović | (Montenegro) Lmp | Porto Montenegro |
| Budućnost | (Montenegro) Miodrag Džudović | (Montenegro) Vasilije Terzić | (Germany) Adidas | Savana |
| Dečić | (Slovakia) Juraj Jarábek | (Montenegro) Jonathan Dreshaj | (Serbia) Seven | Castellana |
| Iskra | (Montenegro) Aleksandar Nedović | (Montenegro) Ognjen Obradović | (Spain) Joma | Lob |
| Jedinstvo | (Montenegro) Vuko Bogavac | (Montenegro) Momčilo Dulović | (Serbia) NAAI | Splendid Hotel |
| Jezero | (Montenegro) Rade Petrović | (Montenegro) Edis Redžepagić | (Italy) Macron | Samont |
| Mornar | (Montenegro) Andrija Delibašić | (Montenegro) Aleksandar Vujačić | (Serbia) Seven | Municipality of Bar |
| Petrovac | (Montenegro) Dušan Ivanović | (Montenegro) Zoran Mikijelj | (Italy) Macron | Municipality of Budva |
| Rudar | (Serbia) Dragan Aničić | (Montenegro) Aleksa Golubović | (Germany) Adidas | Elektroprivreda Crne Gore |
| Sutjeska | (Montenegro) Nenad Brnović | (Montenegro) Vladan Giljen | (Spain) Joma | Intersport |

== League table ==
| Pos | Team | Pld | W | D | L | GF | GA | GD | Pts | Qualification or relegation |
|---|---|---|---|---|---|---|---|---|---|---|
| 1 | Budućnost (C) | 36 | 20 | 10 | 6 | 61 | 37 | +24 | 70 (Note: Budućnost finished ahead of Sutjeska on head to head points: Budućnost 8 points, Sutjeska 2 points.) | Qualification for the Champions League preliminary round |
| 2 | Sutjeska | 36 | 20 | 10 | 6 | 75 | 34 | +41 | 70 | Qualification for the Europa Conference League first qualifying round |
| 3 | Arsenal | 36 | 13 | 11 | 12 | 39 | 39 | 0 | 50 (Note: Arsenal finished ahead of Dečić on head to head goal difference: Arsenal +1, Dečić –1.) | Qualification for the Europa Conference League first qualifying round |
| 4 | Dečić | 36 | 12 | 14 | 10 | 44 | 37 | +7 | 50 | |
| 5 | Jedinstvo | 36 | 13 | 8 | 15 | 43 | 54 | −11 | 47 | |
| 6 | Petrovac | 36 | 11 | 12 | 13 | 50 | 57 | −7 | 45 | |
| 7 | Jezero | 36 | 10 | 13 | 13 | 35 | 38 | −3 | 43 | |
| 8 | Mornar (O) | 36 | 11 | 9 | 16 | 30 | 41 | −11 | 42 | Qualification for the relegation play-offs |
| 9 | Rudar (O) | 36 | 9 | 11 | 16 | 36 | 51 | −15 | 38 | Qualification for the relegation play-offs |
| 10 | Iskra (R) | 36 | 7 | 10 | 19 | 33 | 58 | −25 | 31 | Relegation to the Second League |

Source: Football Association of Montenegro (in Montenegrin)
Rules for classification: 1) Points; 2) Head-to-head points; 3) Head-to-head goal difference; 4) Head-to-head goals scored; 5) Goal difference; 6) Goals scored; 7) Draw.
(C) Champions; (O) Play-off winners; (R) Relegated

== Results ==
Clubs were scheduled to play each other four times for a total of 36 matches each.

| Home \ Away | ARS | BUD | DEČ | ISK | JED | JEZ | MOR | PET | RUD | SUT | ARS | BUD | DEČ | ISK | JED | JEZ | MOR | PET | RUD | SUT |
|---|---|---|---|---|---|---|---|---|---|---|---|---|---|---|---|---|---|---|---|---|
| Arsenal | — | 0–4 | 1–2 | 3–0 | 1–0 | 1–1 | 2–1 | 0–2 | 0–2 | 2–2 | — | 1–1 | 0–0 | 2–3 | 1–0 | 1–0 | 0–0 | 1–1 | 0–1 | 0–1 |
| Budućnost | 2–0 | — | 0–2 | 0–1 | 3–0 | 2–1 | 2–0 | 3–3 | 2–1 | 2–0 | 1–0 | — | 1–0 | 3–0 | 4–0 | 1–3 | 2–0 | 4–4 | 2–1 | 1–1 |
| Dečić | 2–4 | 0–0 | — | 3–0 | 0–1 | 1–1 | 3–1 | 1–1 | 5–1 | 1–2 | 0–0 | 4–3 | — | 0–1 | 2–0 | 1–1 | 1–1 | 3–0 | 1–0 | 0–3 |
| Iskra | 2–3 | 1–1 | 0–0 | — | 1–3 | 2–1 | 2–1 | 1–2 | 0–0 | 1–2 | 0–1 | 3–0 | 1–3 | — | 1–1 | 1–1 | 1–1 | 2–2 | 2–1 | 0–2 |
| Jedinstvo | 2–2 | 0–1 | 1–2 | 2–1 | — | 0–1 | 1–0 | 0–1 | 0–0 | 1–1 | 0–0 | 1–3 | 0–0 | 2–1 | — | 2–1 | 3–1 | 2–1 | 3–4 | 0–4 |
| Jezero | 2–1 | 0–0 | 0–0 | 0–0 | 0–2 | — | 3–1 | 2–2 | 3–1 | 1–0 | 1–0 | 1–2 | 2–1 | 2–0 | 2–1 | — | 0–0 | 1–1 | 0–0 | 0–0 |
| Mornar | 0–1 | 1–2 | 0–1 | 0–0 | 2–2 | 1–0 | — | 1–0 | 2–2 | 2–1 | 0–1 | 0–1 | 1–0 | 0–0 | 1–0 | 1–0 | — | 0–1 | 2–0 | 3–2 |
| Petrovac | 1–2 | 4–1 | 2–2 | 1–0 | 1–1 | 2–1 | 1–2 | — | 0–0 | 0–4 | 0–3 | 1–1 | 2–1 | 4–1 | 2–3 | 1–0 | 0–1 | — | 2–3 | 1–1 |
| Rudar | 0–0 | 0–1 | 1–1 | 3–1 | 0–3 | 2–1 | 1–0 | 0–1 | — | 0–0 | 1–2 | 1–1 | 0–0 | 3–1 | 1–2 | 0–0 | 0–1 | 4–2 | — | 1–4 |
| Sutjeska | 2–1 | 0–1 | 3–0 | 3–0 | 5–0 | 3–0 | 1–1 | 2–0 | 4–0 | — | 2–2 | 2–2 | 1–1 | 2–1 | 3–4 | 4–2 | 4–1 | 2–1 | 2–1 | — |

Source: Football Association of Montenegro (in Montenegrin)
Legend: Blue = home team win; Yellow = draw; Red = away team win.
For upcoming matches, an "a" indicates there is an article about the rivalry between the two participants.

== Relegation play-offs ==
The 10th-placed team (against the 3rd-placed team of the Second League) and the 11th-placed team (against the runners-up of the Second League) will both compete in two-legged relegation play-offs after the end of the season.

=== Summary ===
| Team 1 | Agg. | Team 2 | 1st leg | 2nd leg |
|---|---|---|---|---|
| Kom | 2–3 | Rudar | 1–1 | 1–2 |
| Mornar | 4–0 | Berane | 2–0 | 2–0 |

=== Matches ===
30 May 2023
19:00 CEST

| Kom | 1–1 | Rudar |
|---|---|---|
| Knežević 21' (pen.) | Report | Janketić 82' |

Stadion Zlatica, Podgorica
Attendance: 350
Referee: Nikola Dabanović
3 June 2023
17:00 CEST

| Rudar | 2–1 | Kom |
|---|---|---|
| Golubović 10'; Radojičić 19' | Report | Nishimura 90+2' |

Gradski stadion, Pljevlja
Attendance: 500
Referee: Miloš Bešović

Rudar won 3–2 on aggregate.

30 May 2023
20:00 CEST

| Mornar | 2–0 | Berane |
|---|---|---|
| Raičević 7'; Michael 65' | Report |

Stadion Topolica, Bar
Attendance: 800
Referee: Savo Vujović
3 June 2023
19:00 CEST

| Berane | 0–2 | Mornar |
|---|---|---|
| | Report | Bećiraj 40'; Ćetković 49' |

Gradski stadion, Berane
Attendance: 1,000
Referee: Miloš Savović

Mornar won 4–0 on aggregate.

== Statistics ==
=== Top goalscorers ===
As of 25 May 2023

| Rank | Scorer | Club | Goals |
|---|---|---|---|
| 1 | (Suriname) Tyrone Conraad | Sutjeska | 26 |
| 2 | (Montenegro) Žarko Korać | Jedinstvo | 13 |
| 3 | (Senegal) Mendy Mamadou | Petrovac | 10 |
| 4 | (Montenegro) Vuk Striković | Sutjeska | 9 |
| 5 | (Argentina) Rodrigo Faust | Petrovac | 8 |
| 5 | (Argentina) Julián Montenegro | Arsenal | 8 |
| 5 | (Montenegro) Dragan Grivić | Sutjeska | 8 |
| 5 | (Montenegro) Zoran Petrović | Budućnost | 8 |

== See also ==
- Montenegrin First League
