= Montenegrin Cup =

National association football cup played in Montenegro

- Founded: 2006
- Region: Montenegro
- Teams: 30
- Qualifier for: UEFA Conference League
- Current champions: Mornar (1st title)
- Most championships: Budućnost (5 titles)
- Website: fscg.co.me/kupcrnegore
- 2025–26 Montenegrin Cup

The Montenegrin Cup (Montenegrin: Kup Crne Gore) is the national football cup played in Montenegro, established in 2006. The winner of the cup is awarded a spot in the first qualifying round of the UEFA Conference League if they have not already gained a spot in the UEFA Champions League. Most successful cup participant is Budućnost with five titles.

== History ==
=== Before independence ===
Since 1946, Montenegrin football clubs played in the SFR Yugoslavia football system, so in the period 1947-1992 they participated in Yugoslav Cup. From 1992 to 2006, teams from Montenegro played in the Cup competition of FR Yugoslavia and Serbia and Montenegro. Most successful participant was FK Budućnost, who played twice in the finals of Yugoslav Cup (1964-65 and 1976-77).

First stage of Yugoslav Cup was Montenegrin Republic Cup, in which played clubs from lower-leagues. Competition was held from 1947 to 2006, and the winner qualified for Yugoslav Cup first stage. In Montenegrin Republic Cup played all non-First League clubs from the territory of Montenegro.

=== After independence ===
Following independence of Montenegro, Football Association of Montenegro founded Montenegrin Cup as a national football competition, with its first season 2006-07. Direct participation are gaining the clubs from Montenegrin First League and Montenegrin Second League, while the clubs from the Montenegrin Third League played qualifiers for Montenegrin Cup through Regional Cups (northern, central, southern). From its first season, winner of Montenegrin Cup participate in UEFA Europa League.

==== Period 2006-2016 ====
First winner of competition was FK Rudar, who won the title on season 2006–07 without any defeat in eight matches. In the final game, FK Rudar defeated FK Sutjeska - 2-1. That was the first official trophy won in Montenegrin football since independence. On previous phases, FK Rudar eliminated FK Mornar (1-0), FK Berane (1-1, 2-0), OFK Titograd (2-0, 0-0) and OFK Grbalj (0-0, 2-0). Notable games also came in Round of 16, with matches between two strongest sides during that season - FK Budućnost and FK Zeta. First game, attended by 10,000 spectators, won FK Budućnost (2-0), but FK Zeta made biggest win in second game in Golubovci (3-0).
Next season, trophy won FK Mogren, who won the final match against FK Budućnost on penalties (1-1; 6-5). Game for trophy was attended by 10,000 spectators and that was the highest audience on Montenegrin Cup finals. Previously, FK Mogren eliminated FK Pljevlja (5-0), FK Sutjeska (1-1, 1-0), OFK Petrovac (0-0, 1-0) and title-holder side FK Rudar (1-0, 0-0). During that season, FK Berane became first Second League side to reach the semifinals of Montenegrin Cup.
On season 2008–09, the trophy won OFK Petrovac, defeating Lovćen in extra-time (0-0; 1-0). Meeting of two teams in final was surprise, as they in semifinals eliminated strongest teams as FK Budućnost and FK Rudar. During the season, before the final, OFK Petrovac previously eliminated FK Pljevlja (1-0), FK Otrant (2-0, 3-0), FK Mogren (1-0, 2-1) and FK Rudar (0-0, 0-0; penalties: 5-3).
FK Rudar was the first, and until now the only club which won two trophies in a row. They won the title on season 2009–10 with win against FK Budućnost in final (2-1). During that Cup campaign, team from Pljevlja previously eliminated FK Sloga Bar (7-0), FK Jedinstvo (1-1, 2-0), FK Mornar (6-1, 0-0) and OFK Petrovac (2-1, 0-0)
Next year, FK Rudar defended the title after penalties in the final game against FK Mogren. After the 90 minutes, game finished with result 2-2, which was the biggest number of goals in the final until then. That was the third title for FK Rudar since establishing of Montenegrin Cup. Except they defended the trophy, coach of FK Rudar Nebojša Vignjević became the first manager who won two editions of Montenegrin Cup. Before the final, FK Rudar eliminated FK Crvena Stijena (2-0, 2-1), FK Sutjeska (0-0, 2-1) and FK Zeta (1-0, 2-2).
Season 2011–12 is remembered by the fact that one team from Montenegrin Second League won the Cup trophy. Big surprise made FK Čelik from Nikšić, who defeated Rudar in the final match - 2:1. That was the first defeat of FK Rudar in Montenegrin Cup after the season 2008-09 and 28 consecutive wins and draws. After the victory in the Cup finals, FK Čelik became first Second League side who gained participation in European competitions. Except that, striker Veselin Bojić became the first player who scored two goals in two different Montenegrin Cup finals for two different teams (2010-11 for FK Rudar; 2011-12 for FK Čelik). In previous rounds, team from Nikšić eliminated FK Blue Star (2-0), FK Lovćen (1-0, 1-0), FK Bokelj (1-1, 1-0) and FK Jedinstvo (3-0, 0-1).
Year later, FK Čelik again played in the finals, but as a member of Montenegrin First League. Team from Nikšić was defeated by FK Budućnost (1:0), who held the first trophy after their third performance in final. The only goal was scored in additional time, by FK Budućnost striker Mitar Peković. In previous games, FK Budućnost eliminated FK Bratstvo (3-0), FK Jedinstvo (2-0, 1-0), FK Zeta (2-0, 2-0) and OFK Titograd (3-2, 1-1). During the first leg of competition, OFK Titograd defeated FK Pljevlja 10-1 and that's among the highest home wins in the history of Montenegrin Cup. During the same game, striker Luka Rotković scored seven goals, which is another all-time record of competition.
On season 2013–14, Lovćen won the trophy for the first time in the club's history. Team from Cetinje won the final game against OFK Titograd - 1-0. Before the final match, FK Lovćen eliminated FK Zora (1-0), FK Crvena Stijena (8-0, 1-2), FK Zeta (1-0, 1-2) and OFK Petrovac (3-0, 0-0).
OFK Titograd succeeded to hold the trophy for season 2014–15. In the finals, they defeated OFK Petrovac in extra-time (2-1). In previous rounds, OFK Titograd defeated FK Mogren (1-2, 5-1), FK Zeta (0-0, 0-0; penalties: 4-3) and FK Sutjeska (2-0, 2-0). During the same season, in first leg, FK Budućnost defeated FK Pljevlja 9-0, which is another game among the highest home wins in history of Montenegrin Cup.
Rudar won their fourth Cup trophy on season 2015–16. In final match, team from Pljevlja won the penalties against Budućnost (4-3) after the goalless 120 minutes. With that game, FK Rudar became the first team to participate in five Montenegrin Cup finals. Before the game for trophy, they eliminated FK Radnički (1-0), FK Sutjeska (1-0, 3-0), FK Dečić (2-1, 2-2) and FK Bokelj (2-0, 1-0).

==== Period 2016- ====
For the first time in their history, FK Sutjeska became a title-holder on season 2016–17, winning the finals against Grbalj (1-0). That was the second performance of FK Sutjeska in Montenegrin Cup final. In previous rounds, they defeated FK Radnički (5-0), FK Zeta (2-2, 1-0), OFK Petrovac (1-0, 1-2) and FK Iskra (4-3, 5-0).
In 2017–18 Montenegrin Cup, for the second time in history, one team from Second League participated in the finals. That was FK Igalo, which played against OFK Titograd who won the game with 2-0. That was the second trophy for OFK Titograd. On that game, striker Admir Adrović became the first player who scored twice on one final match. Except that, coach Aleksandar Miljenović became the first manager who won two Cup trophies with two different clubs (2008-09 with OFK Petrovac, 2017-18 with OFK Titograd). On their road to final, OFK Titograd eliminated FK Čelik (9-1), FK Zeta (4-0, 2-1), FK Mornar (3-0, 2-0) and FK Budućnost (1-2, 2-1; penalties: 4-3).
Season 2018-19 finished with the second title won by FK Budućnost. Team from Podgorica in the finals won against FK Lovćen - 4:0. That was the biggest win in the history of Montenegrin Cup finals. Except that, FK Budućnost player Mihailo Perović scored a first ever hattrick in the finals. Before the game for trophy, FK Budućnost eliminated FK Rudar (1-0, 0-0), FK Podgorica (1-1, 1-0) and, in the semifinals, FK Sutjeska (0-0, 1-1).
On season 2019-20, Montenegrin Cup was interrupted in March 2020, before the semifinals, due to the coronavirus pandemic. Semifinalists were FK Budućnost, FK Sutjeska, FK Podgorica and OFK Petrovac. Three months after that, Football Association of Montenegro decided that Montenegrin Cup for the season 2019-20 won't be continued.
Due to pandemic, edition 2020-21 was played with different format. Only 16 teams participated and, until the semifinals, in previous rounds teams played only one game. At the end, Football Association of Montenegro decided that the finals will be played in front of limited audience on Podgorica City Stadium. That was the first football match in Montenegro with spectators after nearly 15 months of COVID-19 pandemic. Once again, the Cup won FK Budućnost, which defeated Dečić in the finals (3-1). That was first 'double' for FK Budućnost, who previously won fifth title in Montenegrin First League, but the second 'double' in the history of Montenegrin football, too. For FK Dečić, that was the first participation in Cup finals.

== Format ==
Since the inaugural season, Montenegrin Cup had the same format in every edition. In competition participate 30 teams. The 20 clubs from First and Second League are automatically qualified for the tournament. Other participants are Third League members - semifinalists of three regional cups - Northern region Cup, Central region Cup and Southern Region Cup.
The Montenegrin Cup begins with the round of 28 clubs, while the winner and finalist of previous-year Cup are starting from second phase (round of 16).
In the all phases, extra time will be played if the scores are level after 90 minutes with a penalty shootout following if needed.

== Winners and finals ==
=== Winners by season ===
Key to list of winners
‡	Winning team won The Double
†	Team from Montenegrin Second League

The finals played so far are:

Year	Winner	Result	Runners-up	Venue	Attendance
2006–07	FK Rudar	2–1	FK Sutjeska	Podgorica City Stadium	8,000
2007–08	FK Mogren	1–1 a.e.t. (6–5 pen.)	FK Budućnost	Podgorica City Stadium	10,000
2008–09	OFK Petrovac	1–0 a.e.t.	FK Lovćen	Podgorica City Stadium	4,000
2009–10	FK Rudar	2–1	FK Budućnost	Podgorica City Stadium	7,000
2010–11	FK Rudar	2–2 a.e.t. (5–4 pen.)	FK Mogren	Podgorica City Stadium	5,000
2011–12	FK Čelik	2–1	FK Rudar	Podgorica City Stadium	7,000
2012–13	FK Budućnost	1–0	FK Čelik	Podgorica City Stadium	6,000
2013–14	FK Lovćen	1–0	OFK Titograd	Podgorica City Stadium	6,000
2014–15	OFK Titograd	2–1 a.e.t.	OFK Petrovac	Podgorica City Stadium	5,000
2015–16	FK Rudar	0–0 a.e.t. (4–3 pen.)	FK Budućnost	Podgorica City Stadium	6,000
2016–17	FK Sutjeska	1–0	OFK Grbalj	Podgorica City Stadium	5,000
2017–18	OFK Titograd	2–0	FK Igalo	Podgorica City Stadium	5,500
2018–19	FK Budućnost	4–0	FK Lovćen	Podgorica City Stadium	9,000
2019–20	Interrupted due to the COVID-19 pandemic				
2020–21	FK Budućnost	3–1	FK Dečić	Podgorica City Stadium	1,200
2021–22	FK Budućnost	1–0	FK Dečić	Podgorica City Stadium	5,000
2022–23	FK Sutjeska	1–1 a.e.t. (4–3 pen.)	FK Arsenal	Podgorica City Stadium	3,500
2023–24	FK Budućnost	2–1	FK Jezero	Podgorica City Stadium	5,000
2024–25	FK Dečić	1–0	FK Mornar	Nikšić City Stadium	2,500
2025–26	FK Mornar	1–0	FK Dečić	Nikšić City Stadium	2,883

=== Trophies by club ===
Three teams which won more than one trophy are Rudar who hold four trophies, Budućnost with three and Sutjeska and OFK Titograd with two. Other teams which won trophy are Lovćen, Čelik, Mogren and OFK Petrovac.
Teams which played in the finals, but never won the trophy are Dečić, Grbalj and Igalo
Two clubs which played in Cup final as members of Montenegrin Second League were Čelik (2011–12) and Igalo (2017-18). Čelik was the only Second League member which won the Cup.

Club	Winners	Runners-up	Winning years
Budućnost	5	3	2012–13, 2018–19, 2020–21, 2021–22, 2023–24
Rudar	4	1	2006–07, 2009–10, 2010–11, 2015–16
Sutjeska	2	1	2016–17, 2022–23
OFK Titograd	2	1	2014–15, 2017–18
Dečić	1	3	2024–25
Lovćen	1	2	2013–14
Čelik	1	1	2011–12
Mogren	1	1	2007–08
Petrovac	1	1	2008–09
Mornar	1	1	2025–26
Arsenal	0	1	
Grbalj	0	1	
Igalo	0	1	
Jezero	0	1	

== Venues ==
Matches of the first round are played at the home ground of one of the two teams. The round of 16, quarterfinals and semi-finals (two games on each round) are playing on the home ground of both teams. Final match is played at a neutral venue.
Traditionally, since the first season of Montenegrin Cup, final match has been played at the Podgorica City Stadium in Podgorica, whose seating capacity of 15,230. Every final game is starting at 20:00 by local time.
In 2016, Football Association of Montenegro and the Old Royal Capital Cetinje revealed that final match venue will be moved in perspective, after the building of new stadium in Cetinje.

== Participants ==
=== Montenegrin Cup all time table ===
Since establishing (2006), in Montenegrin Cup played 52 different teams. Among them are members of all official leagues in Montenegro.
Most successful on all-time table are FK Budućnost and FK Rudar, who are the only teams which participated in the Cup final more than three times.
Below is the list of all participants, with their scores in the all seasons of Montenegrin Cup.

Club	Ssn	Win	Run	SF	Pld	W	D	L	GD	Pts
FK Budućnost Podgorica	18	5	3	11	94	64	20	10	188-50	212
FK Rudar Pljevlja	18	4	1	9	82	38	32	12	112-53	146
FK Sutjeska Nikšić	18	2	1	6	77	39	15	23	122-59	132
OFK Petrovac	18	1	1	7	80	36	22	22	94-60	130
OFK Titograd	16	2	1	4	70	35	15	20	143-68	123
FK Zeta Golubovci	17	0	0	3	72	33	17	22	113-73	116
OFK Grbalj Radanovići	16	0	1	5	65	33	13	19	115-69	112
FK Lovćen Cetinje	14	1	2	4	62	28	12	22	91-61	96
FK Dečić Tuzi	18	0	2	4	59	25	16	20	87-72	91
FK Mornar Bar	17	0	0	0	53	26	8	19	87-63	86
FK Mogren Budva	9	1	1	3	39	20	12	7	64-32	72
FK Bokelj Kotor	18	0	0	1	46	16	8	22	55-59	56
FK Iskra Danilovgrad	15	0	0	4	41	16	6	19	54-64	54
FK Jedinstvo Bijelo Polje	18	0	0	1	37	12	9	18	33-58	45
FK Čelik Nikšić	11	1	1	2	29	9	11	9	22-35	38
FK Podgorica	9	0	0	0	23	10	5	8	33-28	35
FK Berane	14	0	0	1	30	7	10	13	32-59	31
FK Jezero Plav	18	0	1	1	29	8	3	19	30-56	27
FK Arsenal Tivat	16	0	1	1	28	6	5	17	26-55	24
FK Igalo	10	0	1	1	23	6	5	12	27-40	23
FK Kom Podgorica	18	0	0	0	29	6	4	19	33-56	22
FK Ibar Rožaje	14	0	0	0	25	5	4	16	21-56	19
FK Crvena Stijena Podgorica	8	0	0	0	19	5	3	11	12-36	18
FK Otrant Ulcinj	10	0	0	0	18	4	4	10	14-33	16
OFK Bar	5	0	0	0	15	4	4	7	11-21	16
FK Bratstvo Cijevna	11	0	0	0	17	4	1	12	15-33	13
FK Brskovo Mojkovac	4	0	0	0	10	3	2	5	8-16	11
FK Zora Spuž	5	0	0	0	9	2	2	5	9-9	8
FK Drezga	3	0	0	0	7	2	1	4	7-14	7
FK Pljevlja	7	0	0	0	13	2	1	10	10-43	7
FK Cetinje	9	0	0	0	11	1	2	8	4-22	5
FK Komovi Andrijevica	3	0	0	0	5	1	1	3	2-16	4
FK Gorštak Kolašin	3	0	0	0	5	1	1	3	2-11	4
FK Ribnica Podgorica	6	0	0	0	8	1	1	6	7-25	4
FK Zabjelo Podgorica	9	0	0	0	11	0	4	7	7-20	4
FK Petnjica	6	0	0	0	7	1	0	6	6-17	3
FK Blue Star Podgorica	2	0	0	0	2	0	1	1	0-2	1
FK Gornja Zeta	1	0	0	0	3	0	1	2	1-11	1
FK Tekstilac Bijelo Polje	3	0	0	0	3	0	0	3	1-11	0
FK Gusinje	3	0	0	0	3	0	0	3	0-8	0
FK Radnički Berane	3	0	0	0	3	0	0	3	0-8	0
OFK Bijela	1	0	0	0	1	0	0	1	0-4	0
FK Grafičar Podgorica	4	0	0	0	4	0	0	4	1-10	0
FK Prvijenac Bijelo Polje	2	0	0	0	2	0	0	2	0-4	0
OFK Borac Bijelo Polje	2	0	0	0	2	0	0	2	0-8	0
FK Napredak Berane	1	0	0	0	1	0	0	1	0-3	0
FK Fair Play Bijelo Polje	1	0	0	0	1	0	0	1	0-7	0
FK Polimlje Murino	3	0	0	0	3	0	0	3	1-9	0
FK Sloga Radovići	6	0	0	0	6	0	0	6	2-25	0
FK Sloga Bar	4	0	0	0	4	0	0	4	0-16	0
FK Hajduk Bar	5	0	0	0	5	0	0	5	1-32	0
OFK Mladost Donja Gorica	3	0	0	0	3	0	0	3	4-9	0

Ssn = seasons played in Montenegrin Cup; Win = Winners; Run = Runner-up; SF = Semifinalists; Pld = Matches played; W = Wins; D = Draws; L = Losses; GD = Goal difference; Pts = Points (3 for win, 1 for draw).
Including the results from 2023–24 season. Results from season 2019–20, which was interrupted due to COVID-19 pandemic after the quarterfinals, are included, too.

=== Montenegrin clubs in Yugoslav Cup (1947-2006) ===
Before the independence of Montenegro, football clubs from that country played in Yugoslav Cup, and also in the Cup of Serbia and Montenegro. In the Cups of SFR Yugoslavia, FR Yugoslavia and Serbia and Montenegro participated 17 different Montenegrin clubs.
Most successful participant was FK Budućnost who played twice in the finals of Yugoslav Cup (1964-65 and 1976-77).

Club	Ssn	Win	Run	Pld	W	D	L	GD	Pts
FK Budućnost Podgorica	44	0	2	109	48	17	44	145-162	161
FK Sutjeska Nikšić	35	0	0	54	15	9	30	53-93	54
FK Rudar Pljevlja	11	0	0	20	4	5	11	26-40	17
FK Zeta Golubovci	7	0	0	13	5	2	6	18-18	17
FK Lovćen Cetinje	11	0	0	14	3	0	11	12-41	9
FK Mogren Budva	6	0	0	10	2	3	5	8-14	9
FK Crvena Stijena Podgorica	3	0	0	5	2	1	2	5-13	7
OFK Titograd	7	0	0	9	2	1	6	7-23	7
FK Bokelj Kotor	3	0	0	5	2	0	3	6-8	6
FK Kom Podgorica	5	0	0	8	2	0	6	4-16	6
FK Iskra Danilovgrad	2	0	0	4	1	0	3	2-16	3
FK Čelik Nikšić	3	0	0	5	0	2	3	7-15	2
FK Jedinstvo Bijelo Polje	5	0	0	5	0	0	5	1-9	0
FK Berane	1	0	0	1	0	0	1	1-3	0
OFK Igalo	1	0	0	1	0	0	1	2-3	0
FK Mornar Bar	1	0	0	1	0	0	1	0-2	0
FK Tekstilac Bijelo Polje	1	0	0	1	0	0	1	0-7	0

== Players and managers ==
=== Scorers (final games) ===
Since first edition of Montenegrin Cup (2006–07), 29 different players scored a goal in the final game. Among them, one player scored three goals (Mihailo Perović) and two players scored two goals - Veselin Bojić and Admir Adrović. Mihailo Perović is the only player who scored three goals on a single final game. Bojić is the only player who scored goals for two different teams.
One player scored an own-goal.

Goals	Player	Club(s)	Final(s)
3	(Montenegro) Mihailo Perović	Budućnost	2018–19
2	(Montenegro) Veselin Bojić	Rudar, Čelik	2010–11, 2011-12
2	(Montenegro) Admir Adrović	OFK Titograd	2017–18
1	(Montenegro) Mitar Peković	Budućnost	2012–13
1	(Serbia) Ilija Stolica	Budućnost	2009–10
1	(Montenegro) Petar Vukčević	Budućnost	2007–08
1	(Montenegro) Marko Vučić	Budućnost	2020–21
1	(Montenegro) Lazar Mijović	Budućnost	2020–21
1	(Montenegro) Igor Ivanović	Budućnost	2020–21
1	(Montenegro) Dejan Zarubica	Budućnost	2018–19
1	(Montenegro) Igor Ćuković	Budućnost	2021–22
1	(Serbia) Đorđe Despotović	Budućnost	2023–24
1	(Montenegro) Milan Vukotić	Budućnost	2023–24
1	(Montenegro) Danilo Pešukić	Dečić	2020–21
1	(Montenegro) Aleksandar Dubljević	Čelik	2011–12
1	(Montenegro) Draško Božović	Lovćen	2013–14
1	(Montenegro) Marko Šćepanović	OFK Titograd	2014–15
1	(Montenegro) Ardian Đokaj	Mogren	2010–11
1	(Montenegro) Marko Ćetković	Mogren	2010–11
1	(Montenegro) Ratko Zec	Mogren	2007–08
1	(Montenegro) Ivan Knežević	Petrovac	2014–15
1	(Montenegro) Luka Rotković	Petrovac	2008–09
1	(Serbia) Ivica Jovanović	Rudar	2011–12
1	(Montenegro) Neđeljko Vlahović	Rudar	2010–11
1	(Serbia) Predrag Ranđelović	Rudar	2009–10
1	(Montenegro) Blažo Igumanović	Rudar	2009–10
1	(Montenegro) Ramiz Lukovac	Rudar	2006–07
1	(Montenegro) Miloš Vraneš	Rudar	2006–07
1	(Tunisia) Wajdi Sahli	Sutjeska	2022–23
1	(Montenegro) Miljan Vlaisavljević	Sutjeska	2016–17
1	(Montenegro) Dražen Međedović	Sutjeska	2006–07
1	(Montenegro) Ćetko Manojlović	Arsenal	2022–23
1	(Montenegro) Edis Redžepagić	Jezero	2023–24
Own goal	(Montenegro) Marko Marković	Petrovac	2014–15

=== Managers ===
During the history, 12 different managers won the title of Montenegrin First League champions. Among them, Nebojša Vignjević and Aleksandar Miljenović did it twice. Vignjević is the only manager which won more than one title with the same team (FK Rudar).

Wins	Manager	Club(s)	Winning years
2	(Montenegro) Aleksandar Nedović	OFK Titograd, Budućnost	2014–15, 2021–22
2	(Montenegro) Aleksandar Miljenović	Petrovac, OFK Titograd	2008–09, 2017-18
2	(Serbia) Nebojša Vignjević	Rudar	2009–10, 2010-11
1	(Montenegro) Branko Brnović	Budućnost	2018–19
1	(Serbia) Mladen Milinković	Budućnost	2020–21
1	(Montenegro) Radislav Dragićević	Budućnost	2012–13
1	(Montenegro) Mirko Marić	Rudar	2006–07
1	(Montenegro) Dejan Vukićević	Mogren	2007–08
1	(Montenegro) Slavoljub Bubanja	Čelik	2011–12
1	(Montenegro) Mojaš Radonjić	Lovćen	2013–14
1	(Montenegro) Dragan Radojičić	Rudar	2015–16
1	(Montenegro) Nikola Rakojević	Sutjeska	2016–17
1	(Montenegro) Nenad Brnović	Sutjeska	2022–23
1	(Montenegro) Ivan Brnović	Budućnost	2023–24

== Records and statistics ==
=== Final ===
- Most wins: 5:
  - FK Budućnost Podgorica (2012–13, 2018–19, 2020–21, 2021–22, 2023–24)
- Most consecutive wins: 2:
  - FK Rudar Pljevlja (2009–10, 2010–11)
  - FK Budućnost Podgorica (2020–21, 2021–22)
- Most appearances in a final: 8:
  - FK Budućnost Podgorica (2007-08, 2009–10, 2012–13, 2015–16, 2018–19, 2020–21, 2021–22, 2023–24)
- Most appearances in a final without winning: 3:
  - FK Budućnost Podgorica (2007-08, 2009–10, 2015–16)
- Most goals in a final: 4:
  - FK Rudar Pljevlja 2–2 FK Mogren Budva (2010–11)
  - FK Budućnost Podgorica 4–0 FK Lovćen Cetinje (2018–19)
  - FK Budućnost Podgorica 3–1 Dečić (2020–21)

=== All rounds ===
- Biggest win:
  - FK Hajduk Bar 0–13 FK Mornar Bar (2018–19)
- Biggest home win:
  - OFK Titograd 10–1 FK Pljevlja (2012–13)
  - FK Budućnost Podgorica 9–0 FK Pljevlja (2014–15)
- Most consecutive games without defeat: 28
  - FK Rudar Pljevlja (from 2008–09, First round to 2011–12 final)
- Player with most goals on a single game:
  - 7, Luka Rotković (OFK Titograd 10–1 Pljevlja (2012–13))

=== Attendances ===
- Highest attendance on final game: 10,000
  - FK Mogren Budva – FK Budućnost Podgorica, Podgorica City Stadium (2007–08)
- Highest attendance on previous rounds: 10,000
  - FK Budućnost Podgorica – FK Zeta Golubovci, Podgorica City Stadium (2006–07, Round of 16)

Season	Avg	Overall	M	H	F
2006–07	1,126	48,400	43	10,000	8,000
2007–08	1,142	49,100	43	6,000	10,000
2008–09	672	28,900	43	3,000	4,000
2009–10	866	37,250	43	3,000	7,000
2010–11	609	26,800	44	2,500	5,000
2011–12	904	38,900	43	6,000	7,000
2012–13	635	27,300	43	2,200	6,000
2013–14	490	20,100	41	1,500	6,000
2014–15	667	26,650	40	2,000	5,000
2015–16	568	24,400	43	1,500	6,000
2016–17	555	23,850	43	2,000	5,000
2017–18	653	26,100	40	2,500	5,500
2018–19	756	27,200	36	3,000	9,000
2019–20	Interrupted due to the coronavirus pandemic				
2020–21	1,200	1,200	1	-	1,200
2021–22	900	15,300	17	2,500	5,000
2022–23	785	13,350	17	1,500	3,500
2023–24	881	14,100	16	2,000	5,000

M = Number of matches; H = Highest attendance on one game before the final; F = Final game attendance; Games played without spectators not included
Including the 2022–23 season.

== See also ==
- Montenegrin Regional Cups
- Montenegrin Republic Cup (1947–2006)
- Montenegrin First League
- Football in Montenegro
- Montenegrin Cup (women)
- Montenegrin clubs in Yugoslav football competitions (1946–2006)
