= Milija Savović =

Football manager from Montenegro

Personal information
- Date of birth: 8 February 1979 (age 47)
- Place of birth: Titograd, SFR Yugoslavia

Managerial career
- Years: Team
- 2009: Kom
- 2012: OFK Bar
- 2013: Zabjelo
- 2013–2014: Bratstvo
- 2014–2015: Zabjelo
- 2016: Iskra
- 2016–2017: Dečić
- 2017–2018: Podgorica (then Mladost Lj.)
- 2018–2019: Otrant-Olympic
- 2019–2021: Jezero
- 2021–2022: Sutjeska Nikšić
- 2023: Al-Ittihad Tripoli
- 2023–2024: Arsenal Tivat
- 2024–2025: Sutjeska Nikšić

Milija Savović (Cyrillic: Милија Савовић; born 8 February 1979) is a Montenegrin football manager. He is the head coach of Sutjeska Nikšić in Montenegrin First League. He managed several Montenegrin clubs before he took charge at FK Arsenal Tivat. And after successful spell at Sutjeska he went abroad and managed Al-Ittihad Tripoli.

In the 2021–22 season, Savović became champion of Montenegrin First League with Sutjeska and won Montenegrin Coach of the year award.

Since 2014, Savović holds UEFA PRO licence.

== Honours ==
Jezero

- promotion to Montenegrin First League: 2019-20

Sutjeska

- Montenegrin First League champion: 2021-22
- Montenegrin Coach of the year: 2021
