= Aldin Adžović =

Montenegrin footballer

Personal information
- Full name: Aldin Adžović
- Date of birth: 18 April 1994 (age 32)
- Place of birth: Tuzi, FR Yugoslavia
- Positions: Attacking midfielder; forward

Team information
- Current team: Jezero
- Number: 5

Youth career
- Iskra

Senior career*
Years	Team	Apps	(Gls)
2014–2015	Dečić	8	(0)
2015	Mladost Podgorica	1	(0)
2015–2016	Dečić	17	(1)
2016	Borac Čačak	6	(0)
2016–2018	Zeta	83	(10)
2019	Ballkani	9	(1)
2019–2020	Dečić	28	(7)
2020–2021	Iskra	14	(0)
2021	Arbëria	11	(0)
2021-2022	Jezero	53	(7)
2023-2024	OFK Petrovac	48	(2)
2024-2025	Igalo	31	(9)
2025-	Jezero	34	(1)

International career
2015–2016	Montenegro U21	2	(0)
- * Club domestic league appearances and goals as of 25 May 2026

Aldin Adžović (Serbian Cyrillic: Алдин Аџовић; born 18 June 1994) is a Montenegrin football midfielder, playing for Jezero.

== International career ==
In May 2016, while playing with Borac Čačak, he was part of Montenegro "B" team.
