= Montenegrin First League =

Men's top division association football league in Montenegro

- Founded: 2006
- Country: Montenegro
- Confederation: UEFA
- Number of clubs: 10
- Level on pyramid: 1
- Relegation to: Montenegrin Second League
- Domestic cup: Montenegrin Cup
- International cup(s): UEFA Champions League; UEFA Conference League
- Current champions: Sutjeska (6th title) (2025–26)
- Most championships: Budućnost (7 titles)
- Most appearances: Ivan Novović (444)
- Top scorer: Žarko Korać (121 goals)
- Broadcasters: RTCG, Arena Sport, Adriatic Sport
- Website: fscg.me/takmicenja/meridianbet-1-cfl/; https://www.1cfl.me/en/
- Current: 2025–26 Montenegrin First League

The Montenegrin First League (Montenegrin: Prva crnogorska fudbalska liga — Prva CFL — 1. CFL; pronounced [pr̂ːvaː t͡srnǒɡorskaː fûdbaːlskaː lǐːɡa]), referred to as the Meridianbet 1. CFL for sponsorship reasons, is the top professional football league in Montenegro. Founded in 2006, the competition is headed by the Football Association of Montenegro. 10 teams participate in this league. The winner of the Montenegrin First League enter the qualifications for the UEFA Champions League from the first round. The second and third placed teams and Montenegrin Cup winner play in the qualifying rounds of the UEFA Conference League. The last placed team is directly relegated to the Montenegrin Second League, and the two next lowest ranked teams play in Montenegrin First League playoffs.

== History ==
=== Before independence ===
As a part of the Kingdom of Yugoslavia, Montenegrin clubs played in the Montenegrin Football Championship which was formed in 1922. Despite the presence of the nationwide Yugoslav Football Championship, Montenegrin teams did not partake in it. Montenegrin Football Championship played until the beginning of World War II.

The most successful teams at that period were SK Crnogorac Cetinje (10 titles), GSK Balšić Podgorica (7), FK Lovćen Cetinje (5), FK Budućnost Podgorica (4) and FK Arsenal Tivat (1). While SK Crnogorac and GSK Balšić played all the seasons, work of FK Budućnost and FK Lovćen was forbidden in 1935, as they were recognized as workers' clubs by Kingdom of Yugoslavia government and forbidden.

After World War II and the formation of the Socialist Federal Republic of Yugoslavia, the top league became the Yugoslav First League. Montenegrin teams were allowed to partake in the nationwide league structure, with a Montenegrin Republic League acting as a lower-tier division with promotion and relegation between the Yugoslav league system. The most prominent clubs from Montenegro in this period were FK Budućnost and FK Sutjeska.

FK Budućnost was among the founders of Yugoslav First League and a member of its inaugural season. During the most of SFRY era, FK Budućnost played in First League, while another team from Montenegro in top-tier was FK Sutjeska. Other teams played in Yugoslav Second League or lower ranks. Among them, most successful was FK Lovćen, who played twice in First League qualifiers, but without success at the end of campaigns.

Below is the list of performances of Montenegrin teams in Yugoslav First League from 1946 to 1992, with final placements on every single season.

Club	47	49	50	56	57	58	59	60	63	65	67	72	73	76	77
Budućnost	10	6	10	11	9	10	9	11	14	-	-	-	-	15	9
Sutjeska	-	-	-	-	-	-	-	-	-	15	15	16	18	-	-

Club	78	79	80	81	82	83	84	85	86	87	88	89	90	91	92
Budućnost	11	6	11	6	8	14	14	15	14	7	9	14	10	17	12
Sutjeska	-	-	-	-	-	-	-	9	10	10	17	-	-	-	13

In 1992 when SFR Yugoslavia dissolved the Federal Republic of Yugoslavia was formed. Serbian and Montenegrin teams played in its national league, although it was still named Yugoslav First League. In 2003, FR Yugoslavia became Serbia and Montenegro and the football league was renamed. Montenegrin clubs played in the First League with Serbian clubs from 1992 to 2006. In that period, representatives of Montenegro in the Yugoslav/Serbia and Montenegro First League were FK Budućnost, FK Sutjeska, FK Rudar, FK Mogren, FK Zeta, FK Kom and FK Jedinstvo.

Below is the list of performances of Montenegrin teams in FR Yugoslavia First League from 1992 to 2006, with final placements on every single season.

Club	93	94	95	96	97	98	99	00	01	02	03	04	05	06
Budućnost	10	6	11	14	10	8	14	12	15	-	-	-	6	14
Sutjeska	16	18	19	-	20	21	-	5	7	11	4	8	15	-
Mogren	13	20	-	-	-	-	15	19	-	-	16	-	-	-
Rudar	-	13	20	-	-	20	-	-	-	7	17	-	-	-
Zeta	-	-	-	-	-	-	-	-	13	5	8	11	3	5
Kom	-	-	-	-	-	-	-	-	-	-	-	16	-	-
Jedinstvo	-	-	-	-	-	-	-	-	-	-	-	-	-	16

For 2004–05, restructuring of the Serbo-Montenegrin football league system saw the dissolution of the national second league, instead being replaced by two regional divisions for both republics of the union with promotion to the still-united First League.

Montenegrin teams which played in European competitions during Yugoslav era were FK Budućnost, FK Sutjeska and FK Zeta.

=== After independence ===
In 2006, after the Independence referendum, Montenegro split from Serbia. Following that, Montenegrin First League is founded as top-tier national competition. On inaugural season, members of League became three teams from former First League of Serbia and Montenegro, seven from Second League, and two from Montenegrin Republic League.

Between 2006 and 2017, the league consisted on 12 clubs, which played 33 matches during the season. From the 2017-18 season the number of participants in the Montenegrin First League was reduced to 10, with a 36 week-long competition.

20 clubs have participated in the Montenegrin First League. The most successful are FK Sutjeska with five titles and FK Budućnost five national titles too. FK Rudar and FK Mogren won two titles. Other winners were FK Zeta and OFK Titograd with one title.

==== 2006–16 ====
Official logo 2007–2018

The first game in Prva CFL was played on 11 August 2006 in Pljevlja. In front of 5,000 spectators, a game between the home side FK Rudar and FK Budućnost, finished with a victory of the away team (0-2). In the fifth minute of that match, Ivan Čarapić (Budućnost) scored the first goal in the history of Prva CFL.

The first champion of the top-tier CFL was Zeta, who won the trophy on the championship's final weekend, after a hard struggle with neighbouring Budućnost. Game between FK Berane and FK Budućnost was not even finished, after the crowd disturbances during the second half. A third derby between Budućnost and Zeta in Podgorica was attended by 10,000 spectators, which is a record-high attendance in the history of CFL. During the season, many games were disrupted by crowd disturbances and a match between Zeta and Budućnost in Golubovci was not played, after the decision was made by the home team not to open their stadium following discussion with Football Association of Montenegro.

Next season started with incidents during the Montenegrin Derby in Nikšić. Budućnost won the title, with the same number of points as Zeta and Mogren. But, Budućnost had the best score against two opponents from the top of the table. This marked the first trophy for the team from Podgorica. Their manager at that time Branko Babić became the first foreign coach to win the Prva CFL title. With an average attendance of 4,250 for their home games, Budućnost made a Montenegrin First League all-time record.

The title winners for season 2008–09 became Mogren, the first-ever club from the coastal Montenegro to win the title. The race for the champions' trophy lasted until the final week, when Mogren won an away game against Jedinstvo (2-1). At the end of season, they had four points more than second-placed Budućnost and 11 more than the third-place team - Sutjeska.

A year later Rudar won the first title in their club's history. They won the trophy after dramatic struggle with Budućnost, and only two points decided the championship race. During that year, Ivan Bošković from Grbalj scored 28 goals, which is the all-time record for one single season. During the last week of season, his team made another record, with the highest victory ever in Montenegrin First League, against Kom (11-0). During that game, Bošković scored four goals - which is another Prva CFL record, shared with FK Zeta's player Miljan Vlaisavljević and OFK Titograd's player Zoran Petrović.

Mogren became first club to win a second champion trophy in Prva CFL. The team from Budva won the title on season 2010–11, but with equal number of points as second-placed Budućnost: (73). In the end, head-to-head scores compared, Mogren were victorious over Budućnost (2-1; 2-0; 1-2).

Budućnost won their second trophy in season 2011–12, whilst also setting records for highest number of points in CFL by single season (80) and highest number of scored goals by season (83). But, the team from Podgorica didn't win the trophy easily - they were followed by Rudar, who trailed by three points at the end of season. Additionally, Budućnost failed to beat Rudar during the season (0-2; 2-2; 1-1)

Sutjeska became the first club to win two consecutive titles of CFL champion - both times with Dragan Radojičić as head coach. The team from Nikšić won the title for seasons 2012–13 and 2013–14. Sutjeska headed to their first title with five points more than Budućnost, but secured the trophy on last week of the season. During that season, Sutjeska for the first time in the First League played city derbies against Čelik (1-0; 0-3; 0-1), who placed third at the end of competition. Second trophy, Sutjeska won after the dramatic spring half-season and struggle with Lovćen. The title winner was decided a week before the end of season, after a draw between Sutjeska and Lovćen (1-1). That was the first season on which Budućnost didn't finish in first or second position.

At the end of season 2014–15, Rudar won the second title in the club's history. The team from Pljevlja won the race against title holders Sutjeska, who finished second. The team at the bottom of the table - Berane at the end of season had only 13 points with 78 goals conceded, which were negative records of Prva CFL at that time. After the relegation playoffs, Mogren were relegated to the Second League. This was the first time in history of Prva CFL that former champions were relegated.

The tenth edition of Prva CFL finished with a shock, as OFK Titograd from Podgorica won their first-ever national title. During this era, OFK Titograd played under the name Mladost Podgorica. They won the champions' race against city rivals from Budućnost and during the season, OFK Titograd won all three games against them (3-1; 1-0; 2-0). After the last week, OFK Titograd had four points more than the second-placed team.

In the period from 2006 to 2016, FK Budućnost, FK Sutjeska, FK Rudar and FK Mogren won two champion titles, and FK Zeta and OFK Titograd one. During that time, 19 clubs participated in Prva CFL.

==== 2016–present ====
FK Budućnost won their third champions' title on season 2016-17, but with equal number of points as Zeta and OFK Titograd. During the season, six points were deducted from FK Zeta because of irregularities, so they weren't able to win the trophy. Week before the end of season, on Budućnost - OFK Titograd match, ultras of home team burned a part of north stand at Podgorica City Stadium, and the game was interrupted and registered with result 0–3. But, that epilog did not have influence on final placement, as Budućnost finished on the top of the table, with better head-to-head score against OFK Titograd and Zeta.

Next season, FK Sutjeska won their third title. Team from Nikšić dominated from the very beginning of championship and secured the trophy after 30 weeks. Except that, Sutjeska made a new league record with 11 games without conceded goal. They finished season with 22 points more than second-placed Budućnost.

Season 2018–19 started with the poorest performances of Montenegrin clubs in European competitions since independence. Four teams played 10 games in Champions league and Europa League qualifiers, but without any single win. During the season, FK Sutjeska and FK Budućnost have battle for champions' title and 100th Montenegrin Derby in Nikšić was followed by huge incidents after the game, with numerous wounded ultras and policemen. Week before the end, FK Sutjeska won the title - fourth in team's history. At the same time, Nikola Rakojević became the first manager to win three titles. That was the second time in Prva CFL that one club retained the title - both times it did Sutjeska. During the same season, Mornar finished with 12 points and only one victory from 36 games, which is the all-time negative record in Prva CFL.

Season 2019–20 started with the title race between FK Budućnost and FK Sutjeska, but the championship was interrupted in March 2020, after 23 weeks, due to the coronavirus pandemic. At that time, FK Budućnost was a leader, with 11 points more than FK Sutjeska. Two months after that, Football Association of Montenegro decided that Prva CFL will be continued on 30 May and that the season will last until 28 July. But, at the beginning of July, due to COVID-19 case among FK Budućnost players, Football Association of Montenegro decided to stop every official competition. Because of that, placement after 31 week was the final one. Therefore, FK Budućnost became a new champion. The team from Podgorica secured the title before the final interruption, as they have 18 points more than second-placed squad. Except that, FK Sutjeska, FK Iskra and FK Zeta qualified for European competitions, too. Last-placed OFK Grbalj was directly relegated to Druga CFL and FK Kom after the playoff games against FK Jezero.

FK Budućnost defended the trophy on season 2020-21 with 28 points more than second-placed FK Sutjeska. For the first time in teams' history, FK Dečić and FK Podgorica participated in European competition. From the other side, OFK Titograd was directly relegated, while FK Iskra and OFK Petrovac survived via playoffs.

After three years, FK Sutjeska won the new title on season 2021-22. FK Budućnost, which won previous two editions, finished as runner-up. Except them, FK Dečić and FK Iskra qualified for European competitions. Big battle for avoiding the relegation lasted until the final week and at the end, first champion of Montenegro, FK Zeta, directly went to Druga CFL, while FK Podgorica was relegated after the playoffs.

=== Changes in league structure ===
- Number of teams:
  - 2006–07 to 2016–17: 12
  - Since 2017–18: 10
- Number of teams relegated:
  - 2006–07 to 2016–17: 1 automatic plus the 10th and 11th placed team in the First League played a two-leg relegation matches against the second and third placed team of the Second League.
  - Since 2017–18: 1 automatic plus the 8th and 9th placed team in the First League plays a relegation matches against the second and third placed team of the Second League.

=== Rivalries ===
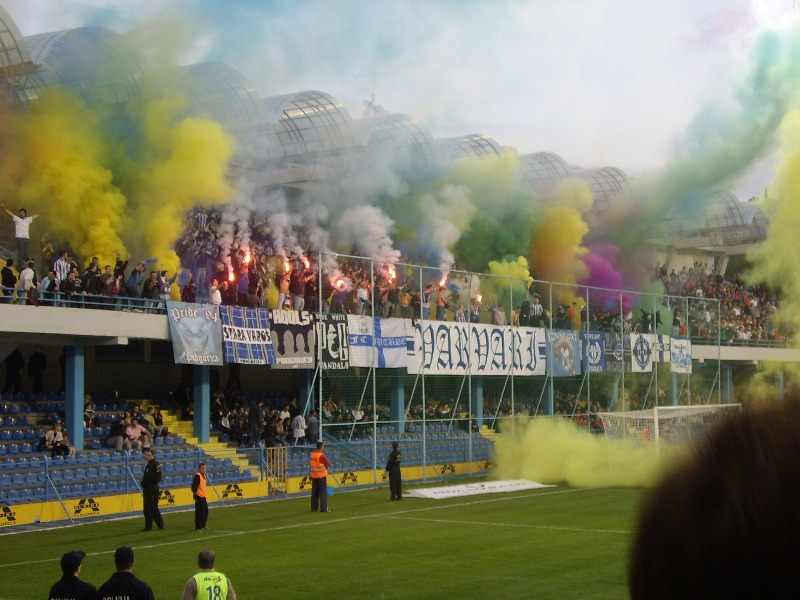
FK Budućnost supporters at Montenegrin Derby game

The main rivalry in the Montenegrin First League is between Budućnost and Sutjeska, often called the Montenegrin Derby. The first edition of the derby in official competitions was played at 1932, and the two clubs have played derbies in the highest-tier competitions of SFR Yugoslavia, FR Yugoslavia and in the Montenegrin First League.

Another traditional rivalry is between FK Budućnost and FK Lovćen Cetinje, because the two clubs have played important games since the 1920s. That rivalry is further fuelled by the fact that Budućnost is the major club from the capital Podgorica, while Lovćen is the main club from the former royal capital, Cetinje.

During the first two seasons of Montenegrin First League, there was a strong rivalry between Budućnost and Zeta. The two clubs from the territory of the Capital Podgorica were the main candidates for the title during the 2006-07 and 2007–08 seasons, and their match from the spring 2007 was attended by more than 10,000 spectators at Podgorica City Stadium. That is the highest attendance in the history of Montenegrin First League.

During the seasons of 2012-13 and 2013–14, there was a big local derby in Nikšić, between Sutjeska and Čelik. At that time, their matches were often attended by more than 7,000 supporters.

In the new period, there was a strong title races between Rudar and Budućnost or Sutjeska and Rudar.

== Champions by season ==
=== Champions ===
Since its inception in the 2006–07 season, six clubs have won the title. As of the culmination of the 2020–21 season, Budućnost have won 5 titles, followed by Sutjeska with 4, while Rudar and Mogren each won 2. Only Budućnost and Sutjeska managed to retain their title in the following season; furthermore, Sutjeska managed to do so twice.

Key

†	League champions also won the Montenegrin Cup.

Season	Champions	Runners up	Third place
2006–07	Zeta (1)	Budućnost	Grbalj
2007–08	Budućnost (1)	Zeta	Mogren
2008–09	Mogren (1)	Budućnost	Sutjeska
2009–10	Rudar (1)	Budućnost	Mogren
2010–11	Mogren (2)	Budućnost	Rudar
2011–12	Budućnost (2)	Rudar	Zeta
2012–13	Sutjeska (1)	Budućnost	Čelik
2013–14	Sutjeska (2)	Lovćen	Čelik
2014–15	Rudar (2)	Sutjeska	Budućnost
2015–16	Mladost (1)	Budućnost	Rudar
2016–17	Budućnost (3)	Zeta	Mladost
2017–18	Sutjeska (3)	Budućnost	Mladost
2018–19	Sutjeska (4)	Budućnost	Zeta
2019–20	Budućnost (4)	Sutjeska	Iskra
2020–21	Budućnost (5)	Sutjeska	Dečić
2021–22	Sutjeska (5)	Budućnost	Dečić
2022–23	Budućnost (6)	Sutjeska	Arsenal
2023–24	Dečić (1)	Mornar	Budućnost
2024–25	Budućnost (7)	Petrovac	Sutjeska
2025–26	Sutjeska (6)	Mornar	Petrovac

=== Performance by club ===
Budućnost has won most titles, seven in total; it is the only club which finished as a champion or runner-up more than 10 times. FK Lovćen, FK Mornar and OFK Petrovac have all finished as a runner-up but never won any title.

Club	City	Champions	Runners-up	Winning years
FK Budućnost	Podgorica	7	9	2007–08, 2011–12, 2016–17, 2019–20, 2020–21, 2022–23, 2024–25
FK Sutjeska	Nikšić	6	4	2012–13, 2013–14, 2017–18, 2018–19, 2021–22, 2025–26
FK Rudar	Pljevlja	2	1	2009–10, 2014–15
FK Mogren	Budva	2	-	2008–09, 2010–11
FK Zeta	Golubovci	1	2	2006–07
OFK Titograd	Podgorica	1	-	2015–16
FK Dečić	Tuzi	1	-	2023–24
FK Mornar	Bar	-	2	
FK Lovćen	Cetinje	-	1	
OFK Petrovac	Petrovac	-	1	

== Top scorers ==
Every season, the best scorer of Prva CFL is awarded with Radio Montenegro Trophy.

The most goals during a single season were scored by Ivan Bošković (28) during the season 2009–10. In two seasons, two players were joint top-scorers. Žarko Korać (4) and Admir Adrović (2) are the only players who were top-scorers in multiple seasons. The majority of top scorers during the single seasons were from Budućnost (4), followed by 3 which played for Sutjeska, OFK Titograd and Zeta.

Season	Top scorer(s)	Club	Goals
2006–07	(Montenegro) Damir Čakar (Montenegro) Žarko Korać	Rudar; Zeta	16
2007–08	(Montenegro) Ivan Jablan	Lovćen	13
2008–09	(Montenegro) Fatos Bećiraj	Budućnost	18
2009–10	(Montenegro) Ivan Bošković	Grbalj	28
2010–11	(Montenegro) Ivan Vuković	Budućnost	20
2011–12	(Montenegro) Admir Adrović	Budućnost	22
2012–13	(Montenegro) Admir Adrović (Montenegro) Žarko Korać	Budućnost; Zeta	15
2013–14	(Montenegro) Stefan Mugoša	FK Mladost Podgorica	15
2014–15	(Montenegro) Goran Vujović	Sutjeska	21
2015–16	(Montenegro) Marko Šćepanović	FK Mladost Podgorica	19
2016–17	(Montenegro) Zoran Petrović	FK Mladost Podgorica	14
2017–18	(Montenegro) Igor Ivanović	Sutjeska	14
2018–19	(Montenegro) Nikola Krstović	Zeta	17
2019–20	(Montenegro) Marko Ćetković	Sutjeska	10
2020–21	(Montenegro) Božo Marković	Sutjeska	16
2021–22	(Montenegro) Adnan Bašić	Petrovac	14
2022–23	(Netherlands) Tyrone Conraad	Sutjeska	26
2023–24	(Montenegro) Žarko Korać	Jedinstvo	18
2024–25	(Montenegro) Žarko Korać	Jedinstvo	16
2025–26	(Montenegro) Balša Sekulić	FK Mornar Bar	15

== Players and managers ==
=== Players ===
==== Appearances ====
Ivan Novović, with 444 appearances, is the most capped player in the history of the league.

Rank	Player	Club(s)	Games	First	Last
1	(Montenegro) Ivan Novović	Zeta, OFK Titograd, Dečić, Budućnost	444	2007–08	2023–24
2	(Montenegro) Miroje Jovanović	OFK Titograd, Kom, Rudar, Iskra	420	2006–07	2020–21
3	(Montenegro) Milan Đurišić	Budućnost, OFK Titograd, Lovćen, Iskra	418	2006–07	2021–22
4	(Montenegro) Draško Božović	Budućnost, Mogren, OFK Titograd, Lovćen, Sutjeska, Rudar, Dečić	411	2006–07	2023–24
5	(Montenegro) Luka Mirković	Lovćen, OFK Titograd, Budućnost	409	2008–09	2023–24

As of the end of 2023–24 season.
First = First season in Prva CFL; Last = Last season in Prva CFL

==== Goalscorers ====
Since the foundation of Prva CFL, most goals in competition scored Žarko Korać. Playing for three teams, he scored overall 121 goals. Below is a list of the 5 best all-time goalscorers.

Rank	Player	Club(s)	Goals	Games	First	Last
1	(Montenegro) Žarko Korać	Zeta, Grbalj, Jedinstvo	121	222	2006–07	2024–25
2	(Montenegro) Admir Adrović	Berane, Sutjeska, Budućnost, OFK Titograd, Dečić, Podgorica	110	303	2006–07	2021–22
3	(Montenegro) Ivan Vuković	Budućnost, OFK Titograd, Grbalj, Iskra	95	287	2006–07	2021–22
4	(Montenegro) Božo Marković	Sutjeska, OFK Titograd, Dečić, Mornar	83	308	2009–10	2023–24
5	(Montenegro) Ivan Jablan	Petrovac, Lovćen, Grbalj	76	298	2006–07	2018–19

As of the end of 2023–24 season.
Clubs = Only Prva CFL teams for which every player scored at least one goal; First = Season of player's first goal in Prva CFL; Last = Season of player's last goal in Prva CFL

==== Goalkeepers ====
From the first edition of Prva CFL, many goalkeepers made runs without conceded goals during the three or more games. Below is the list of three biggest runs from 2006 to 2007 edition until now, classified by minutes without conceded goal.

Rank	Goalkeeper	Season	Club	Minutes
1	(Montenegro) Vladan Giljen	2017–18	Sutjeska	1019
2	(Montenegro) Mileta Radulović	2012–13	Grbalj	845
3	(Montenegro) Mladen Božović	2006–07	Budućnost	795

=== Managers ===
During the history, 14 managers have won the title of Montenegrin First League champions. Among them, Nikola Rakojević won three titles, while Dragan Radojičić, Mladen Milinković, and Dejan Vukićević each won the league twice.

Manager	Club(s)	Wins	Winning years
(Montenegro) Nikola Rakojević	OFK Titograd, Sutjeska	3	2015–16, 2017–18, 2018–19
(Montenegro) Dragan Radojičić	Sutjeska	2	2012–13, 2013–14
(Montenegro) Dejan Vukićević	Zeta, Mogren	2	2006–07, 2008–09
(Serbia) Mladen Milinković	Budućnost	2	2019–20, 2020–21
(Serbia) Branko Babić	Budućnost	1	2007–08
(Montenegro) Miodrag Radulović	Budućnost	1	2011–12
(Montenegro) Miodrag Vukotić	Budućnost	1	2016–17
(Serbia) Nebojša Vignjević	Rudar	1	2009–10
(Montenegro) Mirko Marić	Rudar	1	2014–15
(Montenegro) Branislav Milačić	Mogren	1	2010–11
(Montenegro) Milija Savović	Sutjeska	1	2021–22
(Montenegro) Miodrag Džudović	Budućnost	1	2022–23
(Montenegro) Milorad Peković	Dečić	1	2023–24
(Montenegro) Ivan Brnović	Budućnost	1	2024–25

=== Awards ===
Every year, Football Association of Montenegro is organising awards ceremony for best player and best manager in Montenegrin First League. Best player and manager are chosen by coaches and captains of First League members.

Player of the Year

- 2008 (Montenegro) Nikola Vujović (Mogren)
- 2009 (Montenegro) Ivan Vuković (Budućnost)
- 2010 (Montenegro) Ivan Vuković (Budućnost)
- 2011 (Montenegro) Dragan Bošković (Budućnost)
- 2012 (Montenegro) Blažo Igumanović (Rudar)
- 2013 (Montenegro) Darko Zorić (Čelik)
- 2014 (Montenegro) Vladimir Jovović (Sutjeska)
- 2015 (Montenegro) Marko Šćepanović (Titograd)
- 2016 (Montenegro) Radomir Đalović (Budućnost)
- 2017 (Montenegro) Igor Ivanović (Sutjeska)
- 2018 (Montenegro) Stefan Lončar (Sutjeska)
- 2019 (Montenegro) Marko Ćetković (Sutjeska)

Manager of the Year

- 2008 (Montenegro) Dejan Vukićević (Mogren)
- 2009 (Montenegro) Dejan Vukićević (Mogren)
- 2010 (Serbia) Nebojša Vignjević (Rudar)
- 2011 (Montenegro) Dragan Radojičić (Rudar)
- 2012 (Montenegro) Slavoljub Bubanja (Čelik)
- 2013 (Montenegro) Dragan Radojičić (Sutjeska)
- 2014 (Montenegro) Dragan Radojičić (Budućnost)
- 2015 (Montenegro) Mirko Marić (Rudar)
- 2016 (Montenegro) Nikola Rakojević (Titograd)
- 2017 (Montenegro) Miodrag Vukotić (Budućnost)
- 2018 (Montenegro) Nikola Rakojević (Sutjeska)
- 2019 (Montenegro) Nikola Rakojević (Sutjeska)

== All time tables ==
=== Montenegrin clubs in Yugoslav First League (1946–2006) ===
In period from 1946 to 2006, Montenegrin clubs played in the First league of SFR Yugoslavia (1946–1992), FR Yugoslavia (1992–2001) and Serbia and Montenegro (2001–2006). Below is the list of all matches and seasons by every single club in the First league from 1946 until 2006.

Club	Town	Season	First	Last	Pld	W	D	L	GD	Pts
Budućnost	Podgorica	37	1946–47	2005–06	1152	386	266	500	1274:1625	1424
Sutjeska	Nikšić	20	1964–65	2004–05	671	217	136	318	776:1029	787
Zeta	Golubovci	6	2000–01	2005–06	188	83	34	71	269:250	283
Rudar	Pljevlja	6	1993–94	2002–03	206	66	41	99	217:277	239
Mogren	Budva	5	1993–94	2002–03	170	44	35	91	171:289	167
Kom	Podgorica	1	2003–04	2003–04	30	4	2	24	21:67	14
Jedinstvo	Bijelo Polje	1	2005–06	2005–06	30	3	2	25	18:72	11

=== Prva CFL (2006–present) ===
Since its inauguration in 2006–07 season, 23 clubs have played in Montenegrin First League. Clubs that played all the seasons are Budućnost, Sutjeska and Petrovac.

Rank	Club	Town	Ssn	First	Last	Pld	W	D	L	GD	Pts	HF
1	Budućnost	Podgorica	19	06–07	24-25	646	380	154	112	1133:546	1294	1st
2	Sutjeska	Nikšić	19	06–07	24-25	646	293	178	166	876:603	1057	1st
3	Rudar	Pljevlja	18	06–07	23–24	610	245	144	221	720:656	879	1st
4	Zeta	Golubovci	16	06–07	21–22	538	221	143	174	670:573	805	1st
5	Petrovac	Petrovac	19	06–07	24-25	646	198	191	247	681:844	785	2nd
6	Grbalj	Radanovići	14	06–07	19–20	466	165	134	167	550:518	629	3rd
7	Dečić	Tuzi	15	06–07	24-25	513	158	149	206	512:620	623	1st
8	Titograd	Podgorica	13	06–07	20–21	436	148	120	168	488:516	564	1st
9	Mogren	Budva	9	06–07	14–15	297	132	73	93	402:335	469	1st
10	Lovćen	Cetinje	11	07–08	18–19	366	122	91	153	362:428	457	2nd
11	Mornar	Bar	11	09–10	24-25	378	108	94	176	354:536	417	2nd
12	Iskra	Danilovgrad	8	15–16	22–23	277	92	81	104	289:321	357	3rd
13	Jezero	Plav	6	08–09	24-25	213	68	55	90	211:262	259	5th
14	Jedinstvo	Bijelo Polje	7	06–07	24-25	240	57	64	119	237:389	235	5th
15	Bokelj	Kotor	6	07–08	24-25	201	62	44	95	185:252	230	4th
16	Kom	Podgorica	6	06–07	19–20	199	50	51	98	178:273	201	7th
17	Arsenal	Tivat	3	22–23	24-25	108	32	38	38	114:164	134	3rd
18	Podgorica	Podgorica	3	19–20	21–22	103	31	33	39	111:126	126	4th
19	Čelik	Nikšić	2	12–13	13–14	66	30	17	19	88:63	107	3rd
20	Berane	Berane	4	06–07	14–15	132	26	22	84	110:229	100	11th
21	Otrant	Ulcinj	1	24–25	24–25	36	9	8	19	43:53	39	10th
22	Mladost DG	Podgorica	1	23–24	23–24	36	9	7	20	37:59	34	9th
23	Bar	Bar	1	10–11	10–11	33	7	11	15	30:43	32	12th
Note: As of the end of 2023–24 season

League or status for 2024–25 season
2025–26 Montenegrin First League
2025–26 Montenegrin Second League
2025–26 Montenegrin Third League
No longer exists

Ssn = Number of seasons; First = First season; Last = Last season; Pld = Matches played; W = Matches won; D = Matches drawn; L = Matches lost; GF = Goals for; GA = Goals against; GD = Goal difference; Pts = Points

=== Participants by season ===
Club	07	08	09	10	11	12	13	14	15	16	17	18	19	20	21	22	23	24	25
Arsenal	-	-	-	-	-	-	-	-	-	-	-	-	-	-	-	-	3	7	8
Bar	-	-	-	-	12	-	-	†											
Berane	12	-	-	11	-	11	-	-	12	-	-	-	-	-	-	-	-	-	-
Bokelj	-	10	-	-	-	12	-	-	8	4	10	-	-	-	-	-	-	-	6
Budućnost	2	1	2	2	2	1	2	4	3	2	1	2	2	1	1	2	1	3	1
Čelik	-	-	-	-	-	-	3	3	-	-	-	-	-	-	-	-	-	-	-
Dečić	10	7	11	9	6	10	-	12	-	6	5	10	-	-	3	3	4	1	4
Grbalj	3	4	4	5	7	9	4	7	5	7	7	4	6	10	-	-	-	-	-
Iskra	-	-	-	-	-	-	-	-	-	10	6	7	5	3	8	4	10	-	-
Jedinstvo	11	-	12	-	-	-	12	-	-	-	12	-	-	-	-	-	5	8	7
Jezero	-	-	10	-	-	-	-	-	-	-	-	-	-	-	5	6	7	5	9
Kom	7	9	8	12	-	-	-	-	-	-	-	8	-	9	-	-	-	-	-
Lovćen	-	6	7	6	8	6	9	2	6	9	11	-	9	-	-	-	-	-	-
Mladost DG	∅													-	-	-	-	9	-
Mogren	5	3	1	3	1	4	10	10	11	-	-	†							
Mornar	-	-	-	10	10	-	11	11	10	12	-	-	10	-	-	5	8	2	5
Otrant	-	-	-	-	-	-	-	-	-	-	-	-	-	-	-	-	-	-	10
Petrovac	6	8	6	8	9	5	7	5	7	11	9	9	7	6	9	7	6	6	2
Podgorica	∅									-	-	-	-	5	4	9	-	-	-
Rudar	4	5	5	1	3	2	5	6	1	3	8	5	8	7	7	8	9	10	-
Sutjeska	8	11	3	7	11	8	1	1	2	5	4	1	1	2	2	1	2	4	3
Titograd	9	12	-	-	5	7	6	9	4	1	3	3	4	8	10	-	-	-	-
Zeta	1	2	9	4	4	3	8	8	9	8	2	6	3	4	6	10	-	-	-

=== Relegation and promotion ===
At the end of every season, the last placed team are relegated to the Montenegrin Second League, while the winner of Second League is promoted to highest-rank. Additionally, another two teams from First and Second League every season are participating in the playoffs.

==== Directly promoted and relegated teams ====
Below is the list of directly promoted and relegated teams by every single season. Relegated were last-placed teams in First League, while directly promoted teams were the champions of Montenegrin Second League.

Year	Directly relegated	Directly promoted
2007	FK Berane	FK Lovćen
2008	FK Mladost Podgorica	FK Jezero
2009	FK Jedinstvo	FK Berane
2010	FK Kom	FK Mladost Podgorica
2011	OFK Bar	FK Bokelj
2012	FK Bokelj	FK Čelik
2013	FK Jedinstvo	FK Dečić
2014	FK Dečić	FK Bokelj
2015	FK Berane	FK Iskra
2016	FK Mornar	FK Jedinstvo
2017	FK Jedinstvo	FK Kom
2018	FK Dečić	FK Mornar
2019	FK Mornar	FK Podgorica
2020	OFK Grbalj	FK Dečić
2021	OFK Titograd	FK Mornar
2022	FK Zeta	FK Jedinstvo
2023	FK Iskra	OFK Mladost DG
2024	FK Rudar	FK Bokelj
2025	FK Otrant	OFK Mladost DG

==== Playoffs ====
Montenegrin First League playoffs is a two legs tournament between the teams from Montenegrin First League which above direct relegation, and the teams from Montenegrin Second League which below the direct promotion. Below is the list of playoffs participants by every single season.

†	Playoffs winners.

Season	First League Participants		Second League Participants	
2007	FK Dečić	FK Jedinstvo	FK Bokelj	FK Ibar
2008	FK Sutjeska	FK Bokelj	FK Jedinstvo	FK Čelik
2009	FK Dečić	FK Jezero	FK Mornar	OFK Titograd
2010	FK Berane	FK Mornar	FK Bratstvo	OFK Bar
2011	FK Sutjeska	FK Mornar	FK Berane	FK Jedinstvo
2012	FK Dečić	FK Berane	FK Mornar	FK Jedinstvo
2013	FK Mogren	FK Mornar	FK Bokelj	FK Zabjelo
2014	FK Mogren	FK Mornar	FK Berane	FK Jezero
2015	FK Mornar	FK Mogren	FK Dečić	FK Igalo 1929
2016	FK Iskra	OFK Petrovac	FK Cetinje	FK Bratstvo
2017	OFK Petrovac	FK Rudar	FK Otrant	FK Ibar
2018	FK Kom	OFK Petrovac	FK Podgorica	FK Lovćen
2019	FK Rudar	FK Lovćen	FK Kom	FK Bokelj
2020	OFK Titograd	FK Kom	FK Jezero	FK Bokelj
2021	FK Iskra	OFK Petrovac	FK Arsenal	FK Igalo 1929
2022	FK Rudar	FK Podgorica	FK Arsenal	OFK Mladost DG
2023	FK Mornar	FK Rudar	FK Kom	FK Berane
2024	FK Jedinstvo	OFK Mladost DG	FK Otrant	FK Podgorica
2025	FK Arsenal	FK Jezero	FK Rudar	FK Lovćen

== Records and statistics ==
=== Champions ===
- Highest number of points when becoming a champions: 85 by Budućnost, season 2020–21
- Lowest number of points when becoming a champions: 57 by Budućnost, season 2016–17
- Highest number of games left when becoming a champions: 7 by Budućnost, season 2020–21 (Secured title: 11 April 2021).
- Lowest number of seasons between promotion and titlebe: 4 by Dečić (Promotion: 2020–21; Champions: 2023–24)
- Lowest number of seasons between the title and relegation:: 5 by Mogren (Champions: 2010–11; Relegation: 2014–15); OFK Titograd (Champions: 2015–16; Relegation: 2020–21)

=== Records by seasons ===
- Most points: 85, Budućnost, season 2020–21
- Least points: 12, Mornar, season 2018–19
- Highest number of wins: 27, Budućnost, season 2020–21
- Lowest number of wins: 1, Mornar, season 2018–19
- Highest number of draws: 18, Dečić, season 2024-25
- Lowest number of draws: 3, Kom, season 2009–10
- Highest number of losses: 26, Berane, season 2014–15
- Lowest number of losses: 1, Budućnost, season 2006–07
- Highest number of scored goals: 90, Budućnost, season 2024-25
- Lowest number of scored goals: 16, Kom, season 2009–10; OFK Titograd, season 2007–08
- Highest number of conceded goals: 78, Berane, season 2014–15
- Lowest number of conceded goals: 12, Budućnost, season 2006–07
- Player with highest number of scored goals by single season: 28, Ivan Bošković, Grbalj, season 2009–10

=== Runs ===
- Longest unbeaten run: 23 matches, Budućnost, 22 September 2020 - 20 March 2021, season 2020–21
- Longest run without win: 30 matches, OFK Titograd, 19 May 2007 - 3 May 2008, seasons 2006–07, 2007–08
- Longest winning streak: 10 matches, Budućnost, 17 March 2012 - 9 May 2012, season 2011–12; Budućnost, 31 October 2020 - 17 December 2020, season 2020–21
- Longest losing streak: 12 matches, Mornar, 17 March 2019 - 25 May 2019, season 2018–19
- Longest run without conceded goal: 11 matches, Sutjeska, 16 September 2017 - 6 December 2017, season 2017–18
- Longest run without scored goal: 11 matches, Kom, 30 September 2009 - 7 March 2010, season 2009–10
- Longest run of goalless matches (0-0): 3 matches, Grbalj, 15 September 2012 - 6 October 2012, season 2012–13; Grbalj, 13 October 2012 - 10 November 2012, season 2012–13

=== Single game ===
- Biggest league victory/defeat: 11–0, Grbalj vs. Kom, 29 May 2010 (season 2009–10)
- Biggest league victory away: 0–7, Mornar vs. Grbalj, 23 May 2015 (season 2014–15)
- Most goals on a single game: 11, Grbalj vs. Kom 11–0, 29 May 2010 (season 2009–10); Zeta vs. Bokelj 8–3, 17 May 2008 (season 2007–08)
- Player with most goals on a single game: 4, Ivan Bošković (Grbalj), Grbalj vs. Kom 11–0, 29 May 2010 (season 2009–10); Miljan Vlaisavljević (Zeta), Zeta vs. Mogren 5–0, 4 April 2015 (season 2014–15); Zoran Petrović (OFK Titograd), OFK Titograd vs. Lovćen 7–2, 27 May 2017 (season 2016–17); Tyrone Conrad (Sutjeska), Sutjeska vs. Jedinstvo 5–0, 1 October 2022 (season 2022–23)
- Fastest goal: Milivoje Raičević (Jezero), 00:09; Jezero vs. Sutjeska 1–0, 01.03.2026 (season 2025–26)
- Oldest top scorer: Ivan Jablan (Lovćen), 39 yrs 143 days; Grbalj vs. Lovćen 3–2, 08.12.2018 (season 2018–19)

=== Attendance ===
- Highest average attendance by season: 1,178 (overall: 229,800 / 195 matches), season 2006–07
- Highest single game attendance: 10,000, Budućnost vs. Zeta 1:0, 08.04.2007, Podgorica (season 2006–07)
- Lowest single game attendance: 50, OFK Titograd vs. Grbalj 1:2, 08.12.2007, Podgorica (season 2007–08)
- Highest average home attendance: 4,250 (16 home games), Budućnost during 2007–08 season
- Lowest average home attendance: 206 (18 home games), Mornar during 2018–19 season

==== Attendance by season ====
Season	Avg	Overall	M	H	CH	CL
2006–07	1,178	229,800	195	10,000	Budućnost (2,470)	Petrovac (477)
2007–08	1,064	205,400	193	9,000	Budućnost (4,250)	OFK Titograd (281)
2008–09	1,101	216,850	197	6,000	Budućnost (4,117)	Petrovac (364)
2009–10	1,105	215,550	195	8,000	Budućnost (2,623)	Kom (297)
2010–11	851	167,600	197	4,000	Budućnost (2,058)	Grbalj (335)
2011–12	873	169,350	194	5,000	Budućnost (2,607)	Petrovac (276)
2012–13	871	165,400	190	7,000	Sutjeska (2,529)	Petrovac (281)
2013–14	746	143,300	192	4,500	Sutjeska (2,230)	Grbalj (313)
2014–15	656	127,150	194	4,000	Rudar (1,512)	Mogren (256)
2015–16	693	137,150	198	4,000	Budućnost (1,195)	Grbalj (288)
2016–17	883	171,300	194	5,000	Budućnost (2,015)	Grbalj (354)
2017–18	707	123,800	175	4,000	Rudar (1,233)	Grbalj (283)
2018–19	513	92,300	180	3,500	Budućnost (1,067)	Mornar (206)
2019–20	580	66,700	115	3,000	Budućnost (1,050)	Grbalj (259)
2020–21	Without attendance due to the coronavirus pandemic					
2021–22	548	98,600	180	3,000	Budućnost (1,056)	Jezero (317)
2022–23	786	133,600	170	4,000	Budućnost (1,489)	Jezero (427)
2023–24	679	118,100	174	5,000	Budućnost (1,513)	Mladost DG (333)
2024–25	720	81,400	113	3,000	Budućnost (1,062)	Jezero (327)

M = Number of matches (only matches with spectators counted); H = Highest attendance on one match; CH = Club with highest average attendance; CL = Club with lowest average attendance

== Current season (2025–26) ==
The 2025–26 Montenegrin First League is the 20th season of top-tier football in Montenegro. FK Budućnost Podgorica are the defending champions. The season will begin August 2025. At the end of season, last-placed team will directly be relegated, and 9th and 8th club from the table will participate in playoffs.

The following 10 clubs compete in First League 2025–26.

Club	City	Founded	Position in 2024–25	Seasons in top division	First season in top division	Stadium	Floodlights
Arsenal	Tivat	1914	8th	4	2022–23	Stadion u parku (2,000)	No
Bokelj	Kotor	1922	6th	7	2007–08	Stadion Pod Vrmcem (1,000)	Yes
Budućnost	Podgorica	1925	1st	57	1946–47	Stadion pod Goricom (15,230)	Yes
Dečić	Tuzi	1926	4th	16	2006–07	Stadion Tuško Polje (2,000)	Yes
Jedinstvo	Bijelo Polje	1922	7th	9	2005–06	Gradski Stadion (4,000)	Yes
Jezero	Plav	1934	9th	7	2008–09	Stadion Pod Racinom (2,500)	No
Mladost	Podgorica	2019	1st in 2. CFL	2	2023–24	DG Arena (4,300)	Yes
Mornar	Bar	1923	5th	12	2009–10	Stadion Topolica (2,500)	Yes
Petrovac	Petrovac	1969	2nd	20	2006–07	Stadion pod Malim brdom (1,630)	Yes
Sutjeska	Nikšić	1920	3rd	40	1964–65	Stadion kraj Bistrice (5,214)	Yes

Seasons in top division - including the season 2025-26.

== Montenegrin clubs in European football competitions ==
=== History ===
Montenegrin football clubs have played in four UEFA competitions - the UEFA Champions League, UEFA Europa League (formerly UEFA Cup) and Intertoto Cup.
Champions of Montenegro have never played in the group-phase of UEFA Champions League, and the most successful in the qualifiers was FK Zeta Golubovci in the 2007–08 season and FK Sutjeska Nikšić in 2019–20.
FK Zeta had the best performances in the UEFA Europa League: reaching the playoffs, and OFK Titograd, FK Budućnost and FK Sutjeska which played in Round 3.
FK Mornar and FK Dečić had the best performances in the UEFA Conference League: reaching the Round 3.
The most successful in the Intertoto Cup was Budućnost, which was among the winners during the 1981 season.
Below is a table with Montenegrin clubs' scores in UEFA competitions.

Team	Seasons	G	W	D	L	GD	Pts
FK Budućnost Podgorica	21	69	21	15	33	82:100	78
FK Sutjeska Nikšić	13	41	6	12	23	28:59	30
OFK Titograd	6	20	6	5	9	18:34	23
FK Zeta Golubovci	10	28	6	5	17	25:56	23
FK Mogren Budva	4	12	5	1	6	15:24	16
FK Rudar Pljevlja	8	20	3	5	12	13:33	14
FK Dečić Tuzi	4	14	3	3	8	13:20	12
FK Mornar Bar	1	6	2	2	2	7:9	8
OFK Grbalj	2	6	1	2	3	8:10	5
FK Podgorica	1	2	1	0	1	1:3	3
OFK Petrovac	1	4	1	0	3	5:10	3
FK Čelik Nikšić	3	8	0	2	6	6:36	2
FK Iskra Danilovgrad	1	2	0	1	1	0:1	1
FK Lovćen Cetinje	1	2	0	1	1	0:1	1
FK Arsenal Tivat	1	2	0	1	1	2:7	1
FK Bokelj Kotor	1	2	0	1	1	1:6	1
OVERALL		238	55	56	127	224:409	221

As of the end of UEFA competitions 2025–26 season.
Except the official UEFA competitions, teams from Montenegro represented SFR Yugoslavia in the Balkans Cup, former regional football competition (1960-1994). Teams from Montenegro which played in Balkans Cup were FK Budućnost Podgorica and FK Sutjeska Nikšić. Biggest success made FK Budućnost, who played in the final 1991, after eliminated Galatasaray SK.

=== UEFA rankings ===
UEFA Country Ranking for league participation in 2027–28 European football season (Previous year rank in italics)

- 48 (52) (Belarus) Belarusian Premier League
- 49 (48) Luxembourg National Division
- 50 (47) (Montenegro) Montenegrin First League
- 51 (51) (North Macedonia) Macedonian First Football League
- 52 (50) (Georgia (country)) Erovnuli Liga

== Logo and sponsorships ==
=== Official logo and equipment ===
Since establishment, the Montenegrin First League has had two official logos.

The first logo was presented in 2006. Rebranding of the league came in 2018, together with the new logos of the Montenegrin Cup, Montenegrin Second League and youth leagues.

The official ball of the competition is produced under the Derbystar brand, while the official equipment of referees is a product of Legea.

=== Sponsorships ===
==== Name of the competition ====
Since foundation, the main sponsor of Montenegrin First League has been Montenegrin 'Telekom' which operates under the T-Com / T-Mobile brand. Since July 2022, the main sponsor of the First Montenegrin Football League is Meridianbet company.

- 2006–2011: T-Com 1. CFL
- 2011–2022: Telekom 1. CFL
- 2022–present: Meridianbet 1. CFL

==== Broadcasting rights ====
Since the foundation of the competition, official broadcaster of First Montenegrin League matches is RTCG, the national television station of Montenegro. Matches of 1. CFL are directly broadcast on TVCG 2, with most important matches on the satellite channel.

From season 2017–18, broadcaster of matches is regional group Arena Sport. Every weekend, one game is broadcast live on Arena Sport channel. Since season 2018–19, some games of Prva CFL are broadcast by cable-network channel MNE Sport TV.

== See also ==
- Montenegrin First League playoffs
- Montenegrin Cup
- Montenegrin clubs in European football competitions
- Montenegrin Derby
- Montenegrin Second League
- Football in Montenegro
- Montenegrin Women's League
- Montenegrin clubs in Yugoslav football competitions (1946-2006)
- Montenegrin Football Championship (1922-1940)
- Montenegrin Republic League
- Montenegrin Futsal First League
