= Ćetko Manojlović =

Montenegrin footballer

Personal information
- Full name: Ćetko Manojlović
- Date of birth: 3 January 1991 (age 35)
- Place of birth: Trebinje, Yugoslavia
- Height: 1.82 m (6 ft 0 in)
- Position: Center-back

Team information
- Current team: Arsenal Tivat
- Number: 16

Youth career
- –2009: Grbalj
- 2009–2011: Zemun

Senior career*
Years	Team	Apps	(Gls)
2011–2019	Grbalj	116	(4)
2013–2014	→ Arsenal Tivat (loan)	21	(2)
2019–	Arsenal Tivat	194	(26)
- * Club domestic league appearances and goals as of 1 June 2025

Ćetko Manojlović (born 3 January 1991) is a Montenegrin professional footballer who plays for Arsenal Tivat. He is also the captain of the squad.

After he returned from Zemun, he played eight seasons for Grbalj. Since 2019, Manojlović has played for Arsenal Tivat.

== Honours ==
Arsenal Tivat

- Montenegrin Cup (runner-up): 2022–23
