= FK Jezero =

Jezero
- Full name: Fudbalski Klub Jezero
- Nickname: Hajvani
- Short name: JEZ
- Founded: 1934; 92 years ago
- Ground: Stadion Pod Racinom
- Capacity: 3,000
- Chairman: Ervin Tošić
- Manager: Miodrag Džudović
- League: Montenegrin First League
- 2025–26: Montenegrin First League, 8th of 10
Home colours	Away colours

FK Jezero is a Montenegrin professional football club based in the town of Plav. Established at 1934, the club plays in the First League of Montenegro.

== History ==
After World War II, the first football club in the town of Plav is founded. Officially, foundation year of FK Jezero (FC Lake) was in 1934. Club is named after the Lake Plav, on whose shore is built the town of Plav.

First significant success, FK Jezero made in the 1968–69 season. They won the title of the Montenegrin Fourth League - North champion and gained promotion to the Montenegrin Republic League. After one season, they were relegated. During the seventies, the team from Plav played another three seasons in the Republic League. They had similar results during the next decade, which were spent in third and fourth tier of official competitions in SFR Yugoslavia.

An era of successes started in the second half of the nineties. FK Jezero became one of the strongest sides in the Montenegrin Fourth League, with almost-done promotion in the 1995–96 season. But, in the match for a title, they lost a home game against neighbouring FK Komovi. The game was followed by numerous incidents in which dozens of FK Jezero players and supporters were wounded.

The team from Plav gained another promotion to the Republic League after the 1997–98 season. In the higher level, they met eternal-rival side FK Gusinje, which was a permanent member of the Montenegrin Republic League. Local derbies between FK Jezero and FK Gusinje played in front of thousands of spectators. The highest one was recorded on the game in Plav during 1999, which was attended by 7,000 spectators.

One of remarkable results, FK Jezero made in the 2001–02 season. After the hard struggle with FK Kom, the team from Plav finished as a runner-up of the Republic League and gained its first-ever promotion to the Yugoslav Second League.

On their debut in Second League, FK Jezero hosted FK Iskra (1–0), but the game of the season was against Montenegrin notable side 2002–03 FK Budućnost (0–2), attended by 5,000 spectators in Plav. At the end, FK Jezero didn't succeed to remain a member of the Second League.

Following Montenegrin independence, FK Jezero became a member of the Montenegrin Second League, where they continued with good results. Notable season was in 2007-08 when they won the title of the Second League. With that result, the team from Plav was promoted to Montenegrin First League, which remains a biggest success in the clubs' history.

At that time, FK Jezero spent only one season in Prva CFL, and most of their home games were played in Berane City Stadium, because of lack of infrastructure in Stadion Pod Racinom. They played only few games at the end of season in their home town, including a game against FK Budućnost. During the season, FK Jezero made a few surprises like a win against FK Sutjeska (2–1) and two draws against Budućnost (1-1; 2-2). After the 33 weeks, FK Jezero finished in 10th position, but were defeated in the relegation playoffs against FK Mornar (0-0; 1–2).

Since then, FK Jezero played in the Montenegrin Second League, but without significant results until the season 2019-20, when they finished as a runners-up. With that success, FK Jezero participated in the promotion playoffs and their opponent was FK Kom. First game, played in Podgorica, finished with tight 1–0 victory for FK Kom. Second game, played in Plav, finished with sensation, as FK Jezero won 3-1 and gained promotion to Prva CFL, first after 11 years spent in second-tier.

=== First League Record ===
For the first time, FK Jezero played in the Montenegrin First League in the 2008–09 season. Below is a list of FK Jezero scores in the First League by every single season.

Season	Pos	G	W	D	L	GF	GA
2008–09	10	33	9	6	18	30	62
2020–21	5	36	12	9	15	28	34
2021–22	6	36	14	6	16	42	46
2022–23	7	36	10	13	13	35	38
2023–24	5	36	14	9	13	41	38
2024–25	9	36	9	12	15	35	44

== Honours and achievements ==
- Montenegrin Second League
  - Champions (1): 2007–08
  - Runners-up (1): 2019–20
- Montenegrin Republic League
  - Runners-up (1): 2001–02

== Players ==
=== Current squad ===
As of 15 February 2026

Note: Flags indicate national team as defined under FIFA eligibility rules; some limited exceptions apply. Players may hold more than one non-FIFA nationality.

No.	Pos.	Nation	Player
1	GK	MNE	Šaban Kolić
2	DF	MNE	Abdel Osmanović
3	DF	MNE	Meldin Kojić
4	MF	SRB	Mihailo Ilić
5	MF	MNE	Aldin Adžović
6	DF	MNE	Nikola Jovićević
7	FW	SRB	Petar Bogdanović
8	MF	MNE	Uroš Bulatović
9	FW	MNE	Edis Redžepagić
11	FW	MNE	Nenad Krivokapić
14	MF	MNE	Mario Gjolaj
15	MF	MNE	Ramo Marković
16	FW	MNE	Imran Redžepagić

No.	Pos.	Nation	Player
17	DF	MNE	Ilija Tučević
19	MF	MNE	Ognjen Rolović
21	MF	MNE	Rejhan Redžić
25	FW	MNE	Senid Vuçetoviq
27	DF	SRB	Nemanja Jovičić
29	DF	MNE	Matija Bojović
35	MF	MNE	Amel Đeševic
44	FW	SRB	Đorđe Maksimović
45	FW	MNE	Milivoje Raičević
50	GK	MNE	Igor Asanović (captain)
60	GK	MNE	Dino Redžepagić
80	MF	MNE	Balša Boričić
99	FW	MNE	Anil Julević

=== Notable players ===
- (Montenegro) Meldin Drešković
- (Montenegro) Miodrag Džudović
- (Montenegro) Ivan Ivanović

For the list of former and current players with Wikipedia article, please see Category:FK Jezero players.

== Stadium ==
FK Jezero plays their home games on Stadion Pod Racinom. There is one stand with overall capacity of 2,500 seats. Before the last renovation, the stadium had a much larger all-standing capacity.

== See also ==
- Plav, Montenegro
- Lake Plav
- Montenegrin Second League
- Montenegrin clubs in Yugoslav football competitions (1946–2006)
