= Gradski stadion (Nikšić) =

Multi-purpose stadium in Nikšić, Montenegro

Coordinates: 42°47′05.81″N 18°57′13.43″E

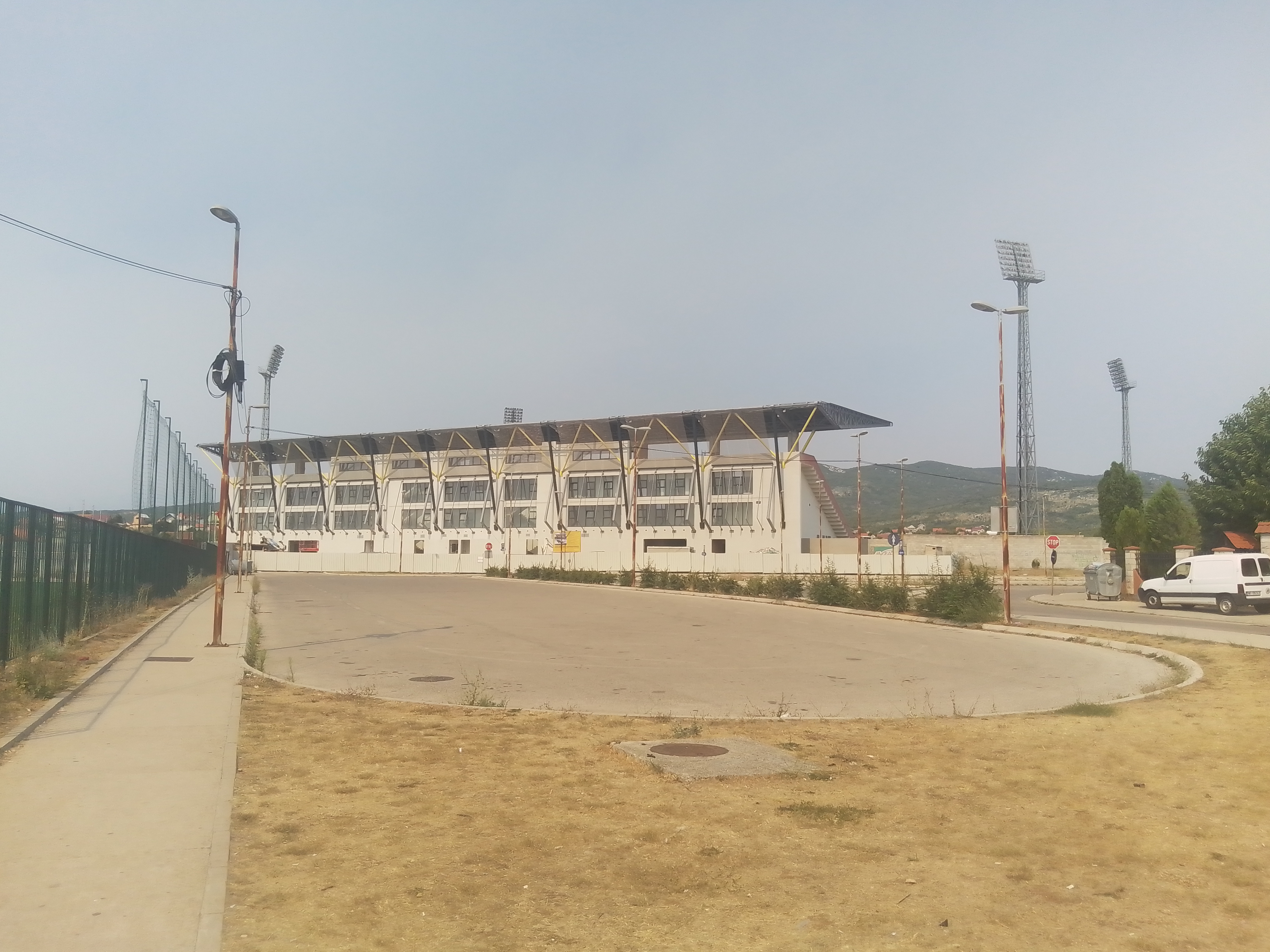
- Interactive map of Gradski stadion
- Location: Nikšić, Montenegro
- Owner: The City of Nikšić
- Capacity: 5,214 (football)
- Surface: Grass
- Field size: 105 m × 70 m (344 ft × 230 ft)

Construction
- Opened: 1946
- Renovated: 2007

Tenants
- FK Sutjeska Nikšić, Montenegro national football team, Montenegro women's national football team

Gradski stadion Nikšić, also known as Stadion kraj Bistrice, is a multi-purpose stadium in Nikšić, Montenegro. It is currently used mostly for football matches and is the home ground of FK Sutjeska and a host of Montenegro national under-21 football team and Montenegro women's national football team matches. The stadium had a total of 5,214 seats before the addition of a new west stand in 2020.

== History ==
Football grounds in Nikšić existed before World War II. However, the first football stadium in the town was constructed in 1945. Over time, the stadium was renovated. During the 1960s, there were stands surrounding the entire stadium, giving it a capacity of approximately 15,000.

After 2000, there was a new renovation of the stadium. In 2001, the old south and north stands were torn down, and a new east stand was built, so the capacity of stadium was reduced to 10,800. After the Montenegrin independence, following the UEFA rules, the stadium capacity is reduced to 5,214 seats. Floodlights were installed in 2015, although they were first used on 7 August 2016, in a match between Sutjeska and Lovćen.

On 29 March 2019, representatives of Nikšić, Montenegro's Committee of Public Works and football association all signed a contract for the reconstruction of the stadium's west stand. The new stand was initially scheduled to be ready by the end of 2022. However, the stand was finally opened to the public in August 2024.

== Pitch ==
The pitch measures 105 x 70 meters. Between stands and pitch, there is an athletic track.

== Tenants ==
During its history, the Stadium Kraj Bistrice was used by FK Sutjeska. Also, many Montenegrin clubs played in Nikšić their matches in European competitions. At their biggest matches in the First League, FK Čelik used Stadium Kraj Bistrice.

It is host stadium for the Montenegro national under-21 football team, too.

== Highest attendances ==
Notable matches played at the Stadium Kraj Bistrice include:

=== Before 2006 ===
- FK Sutjeska - NK Trešnjevka Zagreb 0:0 (first match in First League, 16 August 1964) - att: 7,000
- FK Sutjeska - FK Partizan Belgrade 2:2 (First League, 28 May 1967) - att: 15,000
- FK Sutjeska - FK Budućnost Podgorica 1:3 (Second League, 1 May 1975) - att: 12,000
- FK Sutjeska - NK Hajduk Split 1:3 (First League, 19 May 1985) - att: 15,000

=== After 2006 ===
- FK Sutjeska - FK Čelik Nikšić 1:0 (First League playoffs, 28 May 2008) - att: 8,000
- FK Čelik Nikšić - FK Sutjeska 0:0 (First League playoffs, 1 June 2008) - att: 9,000
- FK Sutjeska - FK Budućnost Podgorica 1:3 (First League, 25 May 2013) - att: 7,000
- FK Sutjeska - FC Sheriff /Moldova/ 0:5 (UEFA Champions League, 23 July 2013) - att: 6,000

== See also ==
- FK Sutjeska Nikšić
- Nikšić
- Montenegrin First League
- Montenegrin Derby
