= 2017–18 Montenegrin Cup =

Tournament details
- Country: Montenegro
- Teams: 28

Final positions
- Champions: Mladost (2nd title)
- Runners-up: Igalo

Tournament statistics
- Matches played: 41
- Goals scored: 128 (3.12 per match)
- Top goal scorer: Admir Adrović (7 goals)

The 2017–18 Montenegrin Cup was the 12th season of the knockout football tournament in Montenegro. This competition began on 23 August 2017 and ended on 30 May 2018. The winners of the competition earned a spot in the 2018–19 UEFA Europa League.

Sutjeska were the defending champions after winning the cup in the previous season. They were eliminated in the quarter-finals.

== Format ==
Twenty–six clubs competed in the competition this season. The first round and the final were competed over one leg and the other rounds were competed over two legs.

== First round ==
Twelve first round matches were played on 23 and 24 August 2017.

=== Summary ===
Team 1	Score	Team 2
Dečić	3–1	Jezero
Zeta	2–1	Mladost Lješkopolje
Budućnost	5–0	Jedinstvo
Kom	2–3	Berane
Ibar	2–1	Petrovac
Mladost	9–1	Čelik
Borac	0–3	Igalo
Arsenal	1–3	Mornar
Pljevlja	1–3	Otrant-Olympic
Crvena Stijena	1–0	Cetinje
Sloga Radovići	1–6	Lovćen
Ribnica	1–7	Bokelj
Sutjeska	bye	
Grbalj	bye	
Iskra	bye	
Rudar	bye	

=== Matches ===
23 August 2017	Crvena Stijena	1–0	Cetinje	Podgorica
17:00 CEST	Burzan 49'	Report		Stadium: Tološi Stadium; Attendance: 200; Referee: Jovica Bojović

23 August 2017	Dečić	3–1	Jezero	Tuzi
17:00 CEST	Vulaj 47', 51'; Đukić 70' (pen.)	Report	N. Bulatović 38'	Stadium: Stadion Tuško Polje; Attendance: 300; Referee: Vladimir Bjelica

23 August 2017	Zeta	2–1	Mladost Lješkopolje	Golubovci
17:00 CEST	P. Krstović 41'; N. Krstović 90+3'	Report	Krivokapić 16'	Stadium: Stadion Trešnjica; Attendance: 600; Referee: Miraš Cerović

23 August 2017	Budućnost	5–0	Jedinstvo	Podgorica
17:00 CEST	Melunović 36'; Vlaisavljević 65', 68'; Sekulić 88'; Camaj 90+1'	Report		Stadium: Podgorica City Stadium; Referee: Nikola Cvijović

23 August 2017	Kom	2–3	Berane	Podgorica
17:00 CEST	Kažić 20'; Milošević 90+3' (pen.)	Report	Suzuki 38'; Sasaki 45+1'; Asanović 54'	Stadium: Stadion Zlatica; Attendance: 150; Referee: Dragan Mijušković

23 August 2017	Ibar	2–1	Petrovac	Rožaje
17:00 CEST	Tahirović 54'; Šofranac 90+3'	Report	Đorđević 71'	Stadium: Stadion Bandžovo Brdo; Attendance: 600; Referee: Savo Vujović

23 August 2017	Mladost	9–1	Čelik	Podgorica
17:00 CEST	Adrović 12', 18'; Ćetković 34'; Burzanović 37' (pen.), 87'; Miličković 44'; Novović 55'; Cicmil 69'; Stijepović 84'	Report	Stanjević 41'	Stadium: Mladost Stadium; Attendance: 150; Referee: Dražen Petrić

23 August 2017	Borac	0–3	Igalo	Bijelo Polje
17:00 CEST		Report	Ljuca 14' (o.g.); Leković 65', 79'	Stadium: Gradski stadion Attendance: 80; Referee: Mladen Knežević

23 August 2017	Arsenal	1–3	Mornar	Tivat
17:00 CEST	Dedejić 7' (pen.)	Report	Nikolić 72'; Kalačević 82'; Džanović 90' (pen.)	Stadium: Stadion u Parku; Attendance: 100; Referee: Miloš Knežević

23 August 2017	Pljevlja	1–3	Otrant-Olympic	Pljevlja
17:00 CEST	Bambur 1'	Report	Divanović 37'; Čaušić 56'; Tachibana 78'	Stadium: Gradski stadion Attendance: 300; Referee: Aleksandar Šćekić

24 August 2017	Ribnica	1–7	Bokelj	Tuzi
17:00 CEST	Elezović 20'	Report	Leverda 4'; L. Maraš 21', 38'; Zlatičanin 28'; I. Bulatović 72', 76'; M. Maraš 74'	Stadium: Stadion Tuško Polje; Attendance: 50; Referee: Ivan Šarac

24 August 2017	Sloga Radovići	1–6	Lovćen	Tivat
17:00 CEST	Lopičić 47'	Report	Draganić 12', 45+1', 72', 90+2'; Talović 30'; M. Pejaković 43'	Stadium: Stadion u Parku; Attendance: 50; Referee: Manojlo Sekulić

== Second round ==
Sixteen clubs competed in the second round played over two legs from 13 to 27 September 2017.

=== Summary ===
Team 1	Agg.	Team 2	1st leg	2nd leg
Rudar	0–4	Sutjeska	0–0	0–4
Lovćen	(a) 2–2	Berane	0–1	2–1
Grbalj	2–1	Bokelj	2–1	0–0
Otrant-Olympic	1–2	Ibar	0–2	1–0
Budućnost	4–0	Iskra	2–0	2–0
Crvena Stijena	1–6	Igalo	0–1	1–5
Dečić	4–6	Mornar	1–2	3–4
Mladost	6–1	Zeta	4–0	2–1

=== First legs ===
13 September 2017	Lovćen	0–1	Berane	Cetinje
15:30 CEST		Report	M. Korać 90'	Stadium: Stadion Obilića poljana Attendance: 150; Referee: Dražen Petrić

13 September 2017	Grbalj	2–1	Bokelj	Radanovići
15:30 CEST	Kovačević 7'; Manojlović 35'	Report	Leverda 66'	Stadium: Stadion Donja Sutvara; Attendance: 150; Referee: Miraš Cerović

13 September 2017	Mladost	4–0	Zeta	Podgorica
15:30 CEST	Adrović 5'; Petrović 7', 31'; Ćetković 45'	Report		Stadium: Mladost Stadium; Referee: Dragan Mijušković

13 September 2017	Dečić	1–2	Mornar	Tuzi
15:30 CEST	Stanisavić 70'	Report	Jovančov 25'; Merdović 54'	Stadium: Stadion Tuško Polje; Attendance: 150; Referee: Željko Radunović

13 September 2017	Crvena Stijena	0–1	Igalo	Podgorica
15:30 CEST		Report	Đukanović 33'	Stadium: Stadion Zlatica; Attendance: 70; Referee: Nikola Cvijović

13 September 2017	Budućnost	2–0	Iskra	Podgorica
15:30 CEST	Vlaisavljević 15'; Vukčević 44'	Report		Stadium: Podgorica City Stadium; Attendance: 45; Referee: Nikola Dabanović

13 September 2017	Otrant-Olympic	0–2	Ibar	Ulcinj
15:30 CEST		Report	Jeknić 16'; Korniichuk 87'	Stadium: Stadion Olympic; Attendance: 150; Referee: Vladimir Bjelica

13 September 2017	Rudar	0–0	Sutjeska	Pljevlja
15:30 CEST		Report		Stadium: Gradski stadion Attendance: 500; Referee: Nikola Vođević

=== Second legs ===
26 September 2017	Sutjeska	4–0 (4–0 agg.)	Rudar	Nikšić
15:00 CEST	Ivanović 34', 41'; Denković 48'; Vučić 59'	Report		Stadium: Gradski stadion Attendance: 350; Referee: Miloš Novović

27 September 2017	Berane	1–2 (2–2(a) agg.)	Lovćen	Berane
15:00 CEST	Đurišić 20'	Report	Raković 53' (o.g.); Talović 62'	Stadium: Gradski stadion Attendance: 50; Referee: Dragan Mijušković

27 September 2017	Bokelj	0–0 (1–2 agg.)	Grbalj	Kotor
15:00 CEST		Report		Stadium: Stadion pod Vrmcem; Attendance: 200; Referee: Nikola Dabanović

27 September 2017	Zeta	1–2 (1–6 agg.)	Mladost	Golubovci
15:00 CEST	Krstović 31'	Report	Adrović 61' (pen.); Burzanović 70'	Stadium: Stadion Trešnjica; Attendance: 200; Referee: Dražen Petrić

27 September 2017	Mornar	4–3 (6–4 agg.)	Dečić	Bar
15:00 CEST	Kalačević 4', 48'; Džanović 64'; Racković 90' (o.g.)	Report	Racković 11' (pen.); Nestorović 13'; Gardašević 72'	Stadium: Stadion Topolica; Attendance: 100; Referee: Miloš Nedić

27 September 2017	Igalo	5–1 (6–1 agg.)	Crvena Stijena	Igalo
15:00 CEST	Karadžić 34'; Leković 36', 83', 90+2'; Kopitović 90+1'	Report	Raičković 48'	Stadium: Stadion Solila; Attendance: 150; Referee: Miloš Bešović

27 September 2017	Iskra	0–2 (0–4 agg.)	Budućnost	Danilovgrad
15:00 CEST		Report	Ristović 27'; I. Pejaković 45'	Stadium: Braća Velašević Stadium; Attendance: 1,000; Referee: Miloš Savović

27 September 2017	Ibar	0–1 (2–1 agg.)	Otrant-Olympic	Rožaje
15:00 CEST		Report	Divanović 28'	Stadium: Stadion Bandžovo Brdo; Attendance: 100; Referee: Miloš Bošković

== Quarter-finals ==
Eight clubs competed in the quarter-finals played over two legs on 1 November and 22 November 2017.

=== Summary ===
Team 1	Agg.	Team 2	1st leg	2nd leg
Budućnost	3–0	Sutjeska	2–0	1–0
Mornar	0–5	Mladost	0–2	0–3
Igalo	3–2	Lovćen	0–1	3–1
Ibar	0–6	Grbalj	0–4	0–2

=== First legs ===
1 November 2017	Igalo	0–1	Lovćen	Igalo
13:30 CET		Report	Talović 54'	Stadium: Stadion Solila; Attendance: 150; Referee: Miloš Savović

1 November 2017	Ibar	0–4	Grbalj	Rožaje
13:30 CET		Report	Kordić 26', 30'; Kovačević 43'; Ž. Korać 81'	Stadium: Stadion Bandžovo Brdo; Attendance: 120; Referee: Radoje Pajović

1 November 2017	Mornar	0–2	Mladost	Bar
13:30 CET		Report	Cicmil 3', 88'	Stadium: Stadion Topolica; Attendance: 200; Referee: Savo Vujović

1 November 2017	Budućnost	2–0	Sutjeska	Podgorica
16:00 CET	Nikač 22'; Raičević 37'	Report		Stadium: Podgorica City Stadium; Attendance: 1,500; Referee: Predrag Radovanović

=== Second legs ===
22 November 2017	Mladost	3–0 (5–0 agg.)	Mornar	Podgorica
13:00 CET	Burzanović 47'; Ćetković 49'; Novović 59'	Report		Stadium: Mladost Stadium; Attendance: 250; Referee: Dražen Petrić

22 November 2017	Lovćen	1–3 (2–3 agg.)	Igalo	Podgorica
13:00 CET	Vujović 72' (pen.)	Report	Bakrač 25'; Leković 45'; Kopitović 69'	Stadium: Camp FSCG; Attendance: 100; Referee: Miloš Bošković

22 November 2017	Grbalj	2–0 (6–0 agg.)	Ibar	Radanovići
13:00 CET	Ž. Korać 70'; Pavlović 79'	Report		Stadium: Stadion Donja Sutvara; Attendance: 100; Referee: Vladimir Bjelica

22 November 2017	Sutjeska	0–1 (0–3 agg.)	Budućnost	Nikšić
16:00 CET		Report	Nikač 26'	Stadium: Gradski stadion Attendance: 700; Referee: Mileta Šćepanović

== Semi-finals ==
Four clubs competed in the semi-finals played over two legs on 18 April and 2 May 2018.

=== Summary ===
Team 1	Agg.	Team 2	1st leg	2nd leg
Budućnost	3–3 (3–4 p)	Mladost	1–2	2–1
Igalo	(a) 1–1	Grbalj	0–0	1–1

=== First legs ===
18 April 2018	Budućnost	1–2	Mladost	Podgorica
16:00 CEST	Tučević 1'	Report	Cicmil 51'; Adrović 90'	Stadium: Podgorica City Stadium; Attendance: 700; Referee: Milovan Milačić

18 April 2018	Igalo	0–0	Grbalj	Igalo
16:00 CEST		Report		Stadium: Stadion Solila; Attendance: 500; Referee: Dragan Mijušković

=== Second legs ===
2 May 2018	Mladost	1–2 (3–3 agg.) (4–3 p)	Budućnost	Podgorica
17:00 CEST	Ćetković 26' (pen.)	Report	Sekulić 32'; Nikač 80'	Stadium: Mladost Stadium; Attendance: 600; Referee: Milovan Milačić

2 May 2018	Grbalj	1–1 (1–1(a) agg.)	Igalo	Radanovići
17:00 CEST	Jović 74'	Report	Simović 36'	Stadium: Stadion Donja Sutvara; Attendance: 450; Referee: Miloš Novović

== Final ==
30 May 2018
20:30 CEST

Mladost	2–0	Igalo
Adrović 54', 57'

Podgorica City Stadium, Podgorica
Attendance: 5,500
Referee: Mileta Šćepanović

== See also ==
- Montenegrin Cup
- Montenegrin First League
