= 2015–16 Montenegrin First League =

Montenegrin First League
- Season: 2015–16
- Dates: 8 August 2015 – 29 May 2016
- Champions: Mladost; 1st title
- Relegated: Mornar
- Champions League: Mladost
- Europa League: Budućnost; Rudar; Bokelj
- Matches: 186
- Goals: 432 (2.32 per match)
- Top goalscorer: Marko Šćepanović (19 goals)
- Biggest home win: Mladost 5–0 Iskra (9 March 2016)
- Biggest away win: Mornar 1–5 Zeta (26 August 2015); Iskra 0–4 Budućnost (22 August 2015); Iskra 0–4 Sutjeska (28 November 2015); Sutjeska 0–4 Budućnost (9 March 2016); Petrovac 0–4 Sutjeska (23 April 2016)
- Highest scoring: Petrovac 5–3 Zeta (26 October 2015)
- Longest winning run: 9 games Mladost; Budućnost
- Longest unbeaten run: 8 games Rudar
- Longest losing run: 7 games Mornar
- All statistics correct as of 1 October 2015.

The 2015–16 Montenegrin First League was the tenth season of the top-tier football in Montenegro. The season began on 8 August 2015 and ended on 29 May 2016. Rudar are the defending champions.

== Teams ==
FK Iskra Danilovgrad, the 2014-15 Second League champion, got promoted to the top level for the first time. FK Dečić won 7–1 on aggregate against two-times Montenegrin champion FK Mogren in the promotion play-offs, and returns to the First League after just one year of absence.

=== Stadia and locations ===
Location of the 2015–16 Montenegrin First League teams

Team	City	Stadium	Capacity	Coach
Bokelj	Kotor	Stadion pod Vrmcem	5,000	(Montenegro) Slobodan Drašković
Budućnost	Podgorica	Stadion pod Goricom	15,230	(Montenegro) Miodrag Vukotić
Dečić	Tuzi	Stadion Tuško Polje	3,000	(Montenegro) Fuad Krkanović
Grbalj	Radanovići	Stadion Donja Sutvara	1,500	(Montenegro) Dragoljub Đuretić
Iskra	Danilovgrad	Stadion Braće Velašević	2,000	(Montenegro) Milija Savović
Lovćen	Cetinje	Stadion Obilića Poljana	5,000	(Montenegro) Milorad Malovrazić
Mladost	Podgorica	Stadion FK Mladost	2,000	(Montenegro) Nikola Rakojević
Mornar	Bar	Stadion Topolica	2,500	(Montenegro) Zoran Mijović
Petrovac	Petrovac	Stadion pod Malim brdom	1,630	(Montenegro) Ivan Brnović
Rudar	Pljevlja	Stadion pod Golubinjom	10,000	(Montenegro) Vuko Bogavac
Sutjeska	Nikšić	Stadion kraj Bistrice	6,180	(Montenegro) Aleksandar Nedović
Zeta	Golubovci	Stadion Trešnjica	5,000	(Montenegro) Dejan Vukićević

Source: Scoresway

== League table ==
Pos	Team	Pld	W	D	L	GF	GA	GD	Pts	Qualification or relegation
1	Mladost (C)	33	21	4	8	53	28	+25	67	Qualification for the Champions League second qualifying round
2	Budućnost	33	19	6	8	48	21	+27	63	Qualification for the Europa League first qualifying round (Note: Rudar qualified for the Europa League first qualifying round by winning the 2015–16 Montenegrin Cup.)
3	Rudar	33	16	10	7	39	26	+13	58	Qualification for the Europa League first qualifying round
4	Bokelj	33	17	5	11	43	28	+15	56	Qualification for the Europa League first qualifying round
5	Sutjeska	33	15	9	9	46	31	+15	54	
6	Dečić	33	11	6	16	38	49	−11	39	
7	Grbalj	33	11	5	17	38	49	−11	38 (Note: Grbalj ahead of Zeta on head-to-head record; Grbalj–Zeta 4–1, Zeta–Grbalj 1–2, Grbalj–Zeta 1–2.)	
8	Zeta	33	10	8	15	37	42	−5	38	
9	Lovćen	33	9	9	15	32	42	−10	36	
10	Iskra (O)	33	7	13	13	29	51	−22	34	Qualification for the relegation play-offs
11	Petrovac (O)	33	8	9	16	33	51	−18	33 (Note: Petrovac ahead of Mornar on head-to-head record; Petrovac–Mornar 2–1, Mornar–Petrovac 1–1, Mornar–Petrovac 0–0.)	Qualification for the relegation play-offs
12	Mornar (R)	33	9	6	18	30	48	−18	33	Relegation to the Second League

Source: Football Association of Montenegro (in Montenegrin), Soccerway
Rules for classification: 1) Points; 2) Head-to-head points; 3) Head-to-head goal difference; 4) Head-to-head goals scored; 5) Head-to-head away goals scored; 6) Goal difference; 7) Goals scored; 8) Draw.
(C) Champions; (O) Play-off winners; (R) Relegated

== Results ==
The schedule consisted of three rounds. During the first two rounds, each team played each other once home and away for a total of 22 games. The pairings of the third round were then set according to the standings after the first two rounds, giving every team a third game against each opponent for a total of 33 games per team.

=== First and second round ===
Home \ Away	BOK	BUD	DEČ	GRB	ISK	LOV	MLA	MOR	PET	RUD	SUT	ZET
Bokelj		0–1	4–1	3–0	1–2	1–0	0–1	2–0	2–1	1–1	3–1	1–1
Budućnost	0–0		2–0	3–0	1–0	0–0	1–3	3–0	1–2	2–1	0–0	0–1
Dečić	0–1	1–2		3–1	1–1	3–2	2–2	1–0	3–1	0–2	1–0	3–1
Grbalj	1–1	0–2	2–1		1–2	0–0	1–0	2–1	4–1	0–1	1–1	4–1
Iskra	0–0	0–4	1–2	0–2		0–0	2–3	2–0	0–0	0–0	0–4	1–0
Lovćen	1–2	2–2	0–0	3–1	4–1		1–2	3–1	1–0	1–1	0–0	1–2
Mladost	1–0	2–0	4–0	3–1	5–0	2–0		2–1	1–2	1–0	4–3	2–0
Mornar	0–1	1–0	2–2	1–0	0–0	0–1	2–0		1–1	1–2	1–3	1–5
Petrovac	0–3	0–2	1–0	0–1	2–4	2–1	1–2	2–1		2–0	0–4	5–3
Rudar	1–0	1–0	2–0	2–1	2–2	1–1	0–0	2–2	3–2		4–1	1–0
Sutjeska	1–0	0–0	0–2	2–0	3–0	2–0	0–1	4–1	0–0	0–2		1–1
Zeta	1–0	0–0	1–1	1–2	0–2	0–2	1–0	1–2	2–0	2–0	0–1	

Source: Football Association of Montenegro (in Montenegrin)
Legend: Blue = home team win; Yellow = draw; Red = away team win.

=== Third round ===
Key numbers for pairing determination (number marks position after 22 games):

Rounds
23rd	24th	25th	26th	27th	28th	29th	30th	31st	32nd	33rd
1 – 12; 2 – 11; 3 – 10; 4 – 9; 5 – 8; 6 – 7	1 – 2; 8 – 6; 9 – 5; 10 – 4; 11 – 3; 12 – 7	2 – 12; 3 – 1; 4 – 11; 5 – 10; 6 – 9; 7 – 8	1 – 4; 2 – 3; 9 – 7; 10 – 6; 11 – 5; 12 – 8	3 – 12; 4 – 2; 5 – 1; 6 – 11; 7 – 10; 8 – 9	1 – 6; 2 – 5; 3 – 4; 10 – 8; 11 – 7; 12 – 9	4 – 12; 5 – 3; 6 – 2; 7 – 1; 8 – 11; 9 – 10	1 – 8; 2 – 7; 3 – 6; 4 – 5; 11 – 9; 12 – 10	5 – 12; 6 – 4; 7 – 3; 8 – 2; 9 – 1; 10 – 11	1 – 10; 2 – 9; 3 – 8; 4 – 7; 5 – 6; 12 – 11	6 – 12; 7 – 5; 8 – 4; 9 – 3; 10 – 2; 11 – 1

Home \ Away	BOK	BUD	DEČ	GRB	ISK	LOV	MLA	MOR	PET	RUD	SUT	ZET
Bokelj				3–0	0–1			2–0	2–1	1–0	0–2	
Budućnost	4–2		2–0			4–0	1–2	1–0				1–0
Dečić	1–2			3–1	2–1			2–0	1–2	0–1		
Grbalj		0–1				2–0	2–0				1–2	1–2
Iskra		1–3		1–3			0–0				1–1	1–1
Lovćen	1–2		2–1		2–2				1–0	0–1		
Mladost	1–0		2–0			1–0		0–1		2–3		2–0
Mornar				3–1	3–0	0–1			0–0			2–2
Petrovac		0–1		1–1	1–1		1–1				0–2	
Rudar		2–0		1–1	0–0			0–1	1–1		0–1	
Sutjeska		0–4	1–1			4–1	2–1	0–1				0–0
Zeta	2–3		3–0			2–0			1–1	0–1		

Source: Football Association of Montenegro (in Montenegrin)
Legend: Blue = home team win; Yellow = draw; Red = away team win.

== Relegation play-offs ==
The 10th-placed team (against the 3rd-placed team of the Second League) and the 11th-placed team (against the runners-up of the Second League) will both compete in two-legged relegation play-offs after the end of the season.

=== Summary ===
Team 1	Agg.	Team 2	1st leg	2nd leg
Bratstvo	2–8	Iskra	2–2	0–6
Cetinje	0–1	Petrovac	0–0	0–1

=== Matches ===
2 June 2016
17:30 CEST

Bratstvo	2–2	Iskra
Popović 58', 65'		Kljajić 55' (o.g.); Novović 60'

Stadion Trešnjica, Golubovci
Attendance: 500
Referee: Milovan Milačić
6 June 2016
17:30 CEST

Iskra	6–0	Bratstvo
Memčević 3', 62'; Novović 24'; Golubović 25'; Redžović 69'; Begović 84'

Stadion Braće Velašević, Danilovgrad
Attendance: 700
Referee: Milovan Milačić

Iskra won 8–2 on aggregate.

2 June 2016
17:30 CEST

Cetinje	0–0	Petrovac

Stadion Obilića Poljana, Cetinje
Attendance: 1,000
Referee: Miloš Savović
6 June 2016
17:30 CEST

Petrovac	1–0	Cetinje
Woo Sang-Hoon 53'

Stadion pod Malim brdom, Petrovac
Attendance: 800
Referee: Miloš Savović

Petrovac won 1–0 on aggregate.

== Top goalscorers ==
The top scorer was won the 2016 Radio Montenegro Trophy.

Rank	Scorer	Club	Goals
1	(Montenegro) Marko Šćepanović	Mladost	19
2	(Serbia) Darko Bjedov	Zeta	18
3	(Montenegro) Dejan Zarubica	Sutjeska	16
4	(Montenegro) Boris Kopitović	Petrovac	13
5	(Montenegro) Šaleta Kordić	Sutjeska	11
6	(Montenegro) Darko Nikač	Budućnost	10
7	(Montenegro) Pjeter Ljuljđuraj	Dečić	9
8	(Serbia) Dejan Đenić	Bokelj	8
8	(Serbia) Ivan Marković	Rudar	8
8	(Montenegro) Miloš Nikezić	Bokelj	8
8	(Montenegro) Blažo Perutović	Lovćen	8
8	(Montenegro) Petar Vukčević	Grbalj	8
