= 2016–17 Montenegrin First League =

Montenegrin First League
- Season: 2016–17
- Dates: 6 August 2016 – 27 May 2017
- Champions: Budućnost; 3rd title
- Relegated: Bokelj; Lovćen; Jedinstvo
- Champions League: Budućnost
- Europa League: Zeta; Mladost; Sutjeska
- Matches: 192
- Goals: 381 (1.98 per match)
- Top goalscorer: Zoran Petrović (14 goals)
- Biggest home win: Lovćen 6–0 Petrovac (30 April 2017)
- Biggest away win: Dečić 1–4 Petrovac (6 August 2016); Jedinstvo 1–4 Rudar (10 May 2017); 0–3 (8 matches)
- Highest scoring: Mladost 7–2 Lovćen (27 May 2017)

The 2016–17 Montenegrin First League (known as 1. CFL 2016–17) was the eleventh season of the top-tier football in Montenegro. Mladost Podgorica are the defending champions. The season began on 6 August 2016 and ended on 27 May 2017; the relegation play-offs will follow.

== Format of competition ==
Locations of the 2016–17 Montenegrin First League teams

A total of 12 teams will participate in this edition of the First Montenegrin League. Mornar was relegated to 2016–17 Montenegrin Second League. They were replaced with FK Jedinstvo Bijelo Polje.

This is the last season of Prva CFL with 12 participants. From the 2017–18 season, there will be 10 clubs in the top-tier rank of Montenegro. At the end of the 2016–17 season, the three worst-placed teams in the league will be directly relegated to the Second Montenegrin League. Additionally, the 8th and 9th-placed teams will take part in play-offs against the 2nd and 3rd-placed teams from the Second League.

== Teams and stadiums ==
From the first time in history, championship title from the previous season will defend FK Mladost Podgorica.
Among 12 members which are participating in Montenegrin First League 2016–17, there are 11 members from the previous season – FK Bokelj, FK Budućnost, FK Dečić, OFK Grbalj, FK Iskra, FK Lovćen, FK Mladost, OFK Petrovac, FK Rudar, FK Sutjeska and FK Zeta. New member is FK Jedinstvo, which played their last games in the First League during the 2012–13 season.
The only town which had more than one member of the First League is Podgorica, with its teams Budućnost and Mladost. Except that, two other clubs are from the cities of Podgorica Capital territory – Zeta from Golubovci and Dečić from Tuzi. There are two clubs from the territory of Municipality of Kotor – Bokelj from Kotor and Grbalj from Radanovići.
First time since foundation of the First Montenegrin League, at the start of the season, managers of all clubs were from Montenegro.

Team	City	Stadium	Capacity	Coach
Bokelj	Kotor	Stadion pod Vrmcem	5,000	(Montenegro) Milorad Malovrazić
Budućnost	Podgorica	Stadion pod Goricom	15,230	(Montenegro) Miodrag Vukotić
Dečić	Tuzi	Stadion Tuško Polje	3,000	(Bosnia and Herzegovina) Edis Mulalić
Grbalj	Radanovići	Stadion Donja Sutvara	1,500	(Montenegro) Dragoljub Đuretić
Iskra	Danilovgrad	Stadion Braće Velašević	2,500	(Croatia) Mirsad Omerhodžić
Jedinstvo	Bijelo Polje	Gradski stadion	5,000	(Montenegro) Goran Jovanović
Lovćen	Cetinje	Stadion Obilića Poljana	2,000	(North Macedonia) Dragi Kanatlarovski
Mladost	Podgorica	Camp FSCG	2,000	(Montenegro) Dejan Vukićević
Petrovac	Petrovac	Stadion pod Malim brdom	1,630	(Montenegro) Aleksandar Nedović
Rudar	Pljevlja	Stadion pod Golubinjom	5,140	(Montenegro) Dragan Radojičić
Sutjeska	Nikšić	Stadion kraj Bistrice	5,214	(Montenegro) Nikola Rakojević
Zeta	Golubovci	Stadion Trešnjica	4,000	(Montenegro) Dušan Vlaisavljević

== League table ==
Pos	Team	Pld	W	D	L	GF	GA	GD	Pts	Qualification or relegation
1	Budućnost (C)	33	17	6	10	52	28	+24	57 (Note: Head-to-head points: Budućnost 10 pts, Zeta 8 pts, Mladost 7 pts.)	Qualification for the Champions League second qualifying round
2	Zeta (Note: Zeta were deducted a total of six points for two separate disciplinary breaches.)	33	19	6	8	38	17	+21	57	Qualification for the Europa League first qualifying round (Note: Sutjeska qualified for Europa League first qualifying round by winning the 2016–17 Montenegrin Cup.)
3	Mladost	33	16	9	8	46	22	+24	57	Qualification for the Europa League first qualifying round
4	Sutjeska	33	15	10	8	43	25	+18	55	Qualification for the Europa League first qualifying round
5	Dečić	33	14	8	11	27	32	−5	50	
6	Iskra	33	14	7	12	29	32	−3	49	
7	Grbalj	33	11	13	9	28	25	+3	46	
8	Rudar (O)	33	11	9	13	35	31	+4	42	Qualification for the relegation play-offs
9	Petrovac (O)	33	11	6	16	30	50	−20	39	Qualification for the relegation play-offs
10	Bokelj (R)	33	8	12	13	28	34	−6	36	Relegation to the Second League
11	Lovćen (Note: Lovćen were deducted three points.) (R)	33	10	7	16	25	36	−11	34	Relegation to the Second League
12	Jedinstvo (R)	33	3	5	25	20	69	−49	14	Relegation to the Second League

Source: Football Association of Montenegro (in Montenegrin), Soccerway
Rules for classification: 1) Points; 2) Head-to-head points; 3) Head-to-head goal difference; 4) Head-to-head goals scored; 5) Head-to-head away goals scored; 6) Goal difference; 7) Goals scored; 8) Draw.
(C) Champions; (O) Play-off winners; (R) Relegated

== Results ==
The schedule consists of three rounds. During the first two rounds, each team played each other once home-and-away for a total of 22 games. The pairings of the third round were then set according to the standings after the first two rounds, giving every team a third game against each opponent for a total of 33 games per team.

=== First and second round ===
Home \ Away	BOK	BUD	DEČ	GRB	ISK	JED	LOV	MLA	PET	RUD	SUT	ZET
Bokelj	—	2–2	1–1	0–0	0–1	2–1	0–0	1–0	3–0	2–1	1–2	0–1
Budućnost	3–0	—	0–1	2–0	2–0	2–0	5–0	1–0	5–0	0–2	4–2	1–0
Dečić	1–3	1–2	—	1–0	1–2	2–1	2–1	2–0	1–4	2–1	1–0	2–0
Grbalj	0–0	1–1	3–0	—	1–1	1–0	2–0	1–0	0–1	2–1	2–2	1–0
Iskra	1–0	0–3	0–0	0–1	—	1–2	1–0	1–3	1–0	1–0	0–3	0–2
Jedinstvo	1–0	0–0	0–1	2–2	1–2	—	0–2	0–1	1–3	0–0	0–0	0–3
Lovćen	2–0	0–2	0–0	2–1	1–0	2–0	—	0–0	0–1	0–0	0–2	0–1
Mladost	3–1	1–2	1–0	0–0	0–0	5–0	0–0	—	1–0	2–1	2–1	1–0
Petrovac	1–1	0–2	3–0	1–0	2–1	0–0	1–0	0–3	—	1–2	0–3	1–1
Rudar	2–0	1–0	0–0	1–1	0–0	5–0	1–1	0–1	3–2	—	1–0	1–1
Sutjeska	2–0	1–1	1–1	1–1	2–1	3–2	1–0	1–1	0–0	1–0	—	0–0
Zeta	1–0	1–1	0–1	2–1	3–1	1–0	1–0	0–0	0–0	3–0	1–0	—

Source: Football Association of Montenegro (in Montenegrin)
Legend: Blue = home team win; Yellow = draw; Red = away team win.
For upcoming matches, an "a" indicates there is an article about the rivalry between the two participants.

=== Third round ===
Key numbers for pairing determination (number marks position after 22 games):

Rounds
23rd	24th	25th	26th	27th	28th	29th	30th	31st	32nd	33rd
1 – 12; 2 – 11; 3 – 10; 4 – 9; 5 – 8; 6 – 7	1 – 2; 8 – 6; 9 – 5; 10 – 4; 11 – 3; 12 – 7	2 – 12; 3 – 1; 4 – 11; 5 – 10; 6 – 9; 7 – 8	1 – 4; 2 – 3; 9 – 7; 10 – 6; 11 – 5; 12 – 8	3 – 12; 4 – 2; 5 – 1; 6 – 11; 7 – 10; 8 – 9	1 – 6; 2 – 5; 3 – 4; 10 – 8; 11 – 7; 12 – 9	4 – 12; 5 – 3; 6 – 2; 7 – 1; 8 – 11; 9 – 10	1 – 8; 2 – 7; 3 – 6; 4 – 5; 11 – 9; 12 – 10	5 – 12; 6 – 4; 7 – 3; 8 – 2; 9 – 1; 10 – 11	1 – 10; 2 – 9; 3 – 8; 4 – 7; 5 – 6; 12 – 11	6 – 12; 7 – 5; 8 – 4; 9 – 3; 10 – 2; 11 – 1

Home \ Away	BOK	BUD	DEČ	GRB	ISK	JED	LOV	MLA	PET	RUD	SUT	ZET
Bokelj	—	—	2–1	0–0	—	—	0–1	0–0	—	0–0	—	—
Budućnost	2–2	—	2–0	0–2	—	4–1	—	0–3 (Note: Match awarded 3–0 to Mladost Podgorica due to match abandonment caused by crowd violence; the match was abandoned with the score Budućnost Podgorica 0–1 Mladost Podgorica.)	—	3–2	—	—
Dečić	—	—	—	—	0–0	2–1	1–0	0–0	0–0	—	1–0	—
Grbalj	—	—	0–1	—	2–3	1–0	0–3	0–0	1–0	—	—	—
Iskra	0–0	1–0	—	—	—	—	—	—	4–0	—	1–0	1–0
Jedinstvo	1–3	—	—	—	0–2	—	0–1	—	3–1	1–4	—	—
Lovćen	—	1–0	—	—	0–0	—	—	—	6–0	—	0–2	0–3
Mladost	—	—	—	—	1–2	6–2	7–2	—	2–0	—	1–3	0–1
Petrovac	1–3	1–0	—	—	—	—	—	—	—	3–1	0–1	3–1
Rudar	—	—	1–0	0–0	2–0	—	2–0	0–1	—	—	—	—
Sutjeska	1–1	1–0	—	0–0	—	4–0	—	—	—	2–0	—	1–2
Zeta	1–0	1–0	3–0	0–1	—	3–0	—	—	—	1–0	—	—

Source: Football Association of Montenegro (in Montenegrin)
Legend: Blue = home team win; Yellow = draw; Red = away team win.
For upcoming matches, an "a" indicates there is an article about the rivalry between the two participants.

== Relegation play-offs ==
The eighth and ninth-placed teams in this season's league, Rudar and Petrovac respectively, will each pair off against the runners-up and third-placed team from the 2016–17 Montenegrin Second League in the relegation play-offs, to be played over two legs. The draw was made on 29 May 2017. The two winners will play in next season's top-flight.

=== Summary ===
Team 1	Agg.	Team 2	1st leg	2nd leg
Petrovac	5–1	Ibar	4–0	1–1
Otrant-Olympic	1–3	Rudar	1–0	0–3

=== Matches ===
31 May 2017
17:30 CEST

Petrovac	4–0	Ibar
Vučinić 37' (pen.); Kacić 45+3' (pen.), 61'; Pepić 64'	Report

Stadion pod Malim brdom, Petrovac
Attendance: 400
Referee: Miloš Novović
4 June 2017
17:30 CEST

Ibar	1–1	Petrovac
Pepić 65'	Report	Suzuki 76'

Stadion Bandžovo Brdo, Rožaje
Attendance: 2,500
Referee: Jovan Kaluđerović

Petrovac won 5–1 on aggregate.

31 May 2017
17:30 CEST

Otrant-Olympic	1–0	Rudar
Tachibana 14'	Report

Stadion Olympic, Ulcinj
Attendance: 2,000
Referee: Jovan Kaluđerović
4 June 2017
17:30 CEST

Rudar	3–0	Otrant-Olympic
Božović 31'; Melunović 53', 67'	Report

Gradski stadion, Pljevlja
Attendance: 3,000
Referee: Miloš Novović

Rudar won 3–1 on aggregate.

== Top scorers ==
As of 26 May 2017

Rank	Scorer	Club	Goals
1	(Montenegro) Zoran Petrović	Mladost	14
2	(Montenegro) Goran Vujović	Budućnost	12
3	(Montenegro) Bojan Božović	Sutjeska	11
4	(Montenegro) Radomir Đalović	Budućnost	10
4	(Montenegro) Vule Vujačić	Dečić	10
6	(Montenegro) Admir Adrović	Mladost	9
6	(Montenegro) Marko Đurović	Lovćen	9
6	(Serbia) Rodoljub Paunović	Iskra	9
9	(Montenegro) Igor Ivanović	Sutjeska	8
9	(Montenegro) Milivoje Raičević	Budućnost	8

== Attendances ==
#	Club	Average
1	Budućnost	1,335
2	Sutjeska	1,165
3	Zeta	716
4	Dečić	665
5	Jedinstvo	563
6	Iskra	559
7	Mladost	518
8	Lovćen	459
9	Rudar	450
10	Bokelj	288
11	Grbalj	271
12	Petrovac	269

== See also ==
- Montenegrin First League
- 2016–17 Montenegrin Second League
