= 2018–19 Montenegrin First League =

Montenegrin First League
- Season: 2018–19
- Dates: 3 August 2018 – 25 May 2019
- Champions: Sutjeska; 4th title
- Relegated: Mornar; Lovćen
- Champions League: Sutjeska
- Europa League: Budućnost; Zeta; OFK Titograd
- Matches: 180
- Goals: 409 (2.27 per match)
- Top goalscorer: Nikola Krstović (17 goals)
- Biggest home win: Budućnost 7–0 Lovćen (2 March 2019)
- Biggest away win: Lovćen 0–5 Grbalj (29 August 2018)
- Highest scoring: Budućnost 5–3 Grbalj (15 May 2019)

The 2018–19 Montenegrin First League was the 13th season of the top-tier association football in Montenegro. The season began on 3 August 2018 and ended on 25 May 2019. Sutjeska Nikšić were the defending champions.

== Teams ==
Dečić and Kom were relegated at the end of the previous season. After earning promotion from the Montenegrin Second League, Mornar and Lovćen competed in the league this season.
The following 10 clubs competed in 2018–19 First League.

Locations of the teams for the 2018–19 season

| Team | City | Stadium | Capacity | Coach |
|---|---|---|---|---|
| Budućnost | Podgorica | Stadion Pod Goricom | 15,230 | (Montenegro) Branko Brnović |
| Grbalj | Radanovići | Stadion Donja Sutvara | 1,500 | (Montenegro) Veselin Stešević |
| Iskra | Danilovgrad | Braća Velašević Stadium | 2,000 | (Montenegro) Aleksandar Nedović |
| Lovćen | Cetinje | Sveti Petar Cetinjski | 5,192 | (Montenegro) Ljubinko Radovanović |
| Mornar | Bar | Stadion Topolica | 2,500 | (Montenegro) Josip Josipović |
| Petrovac | Petrovac | Stadion pod Malim brdom | 1,630 | (Montenegro) Ljubinko Vujošević |
| Rudar | Pljevlja | Gradski stadion | 10,000 | (Montenegro) Nenad Vukčević |
| Sutjeska | Nikšić | Gradski stadion | 6,180 | (Montenegro) Nikola Rakojević |
| OFK Titograd | Podgorica | Camp FSCG | 2,000 | (Austria) Peter Pacult |
| Zeta | Golubovci | Stadion Trešnjica | 5,000 | (Montenegro) Dragoljub Đuretić |

== League table ==
| Pos | Team | Pld | W | D | L | GF | GA | GD | Pts | Qualification or relegation |
|---|---|---|---|---|---|---|---|---|---|---|
| 1 | Sutjeska (C) | 36 | 21 | 11 | 4 | 58 | 21 | +37 | 74 | Qualification for the Champions League first qualifying round |
| 2 | Budućnost | 36 | 17 | 14 | 5 | 56 | 25 | +31 | 65 | Qualification for the Europa League first qualifying round |
| 3 | Zeta | 36 | 16 | 13 | 7 | 36 | 21 | +15 | 61 | Qualification for the Europa League first qualifying round |
| 4 | OFK Titograd | 36 | 16 | 9 | 11 | 47 | 41 | +6 | 57 | Qualification for the Europa League first qualifying round |
| 5 | Iskra | 36 | 13 | 11 | 12 | 46 | 39 | +7 | 50 | |
| 6 | Grbalj | 36 | 11 | 15 | 10 | 45 | 36 | +9 | 48 | |
| 7 | Petrovac | 36 | 13 | 8 | 15 | 40 | 45 | −5 | 47 | |
| 8 | Rudar (O) | 36 | 8 | 17 | 11 | 35 | 44 | −9 | 41 | Qualification for the relegation play-offs |
| 9 | Lovćen (R) | 36 | 5 | 11 | 20 | 29 | 65 | −36 | 26 | Qualification for the relegation play-offs |
| 10 | Mornar (R) | 36 | 1 | 9 | 26 | 17 | 72 | −55 | 12 | Relegation to the Second League |

Source: Football Association of Montenegro (in Montenegrin), UEFA, Soccerway
Rules for classification: 1) Points; 2) Head-to-head points; 3) Head-to-head goal difference; 3) Head-to-head goals scored; 5) Head-to-head away goals scored; 6) Goal difference; 7) Goals scored; 8) Draw.
(C) Champions; (O) Play-off winners; (R) Relegated

== Results ==
The ten league clubs played each other four times for a total of 36 matches each.

| Home \ Away | BUD | GRB | ISK | LOV | MOR | OFK | PET | RUD | SUT | ZET | BUD | GRB | ISK | LOV | MOR | OFK | PET | RUD | SUT | ZET |
|---|---|---|---|---|---|---|---|---|---|---|---|---|---|---|---|---|---|---|---|---|
| Budućnost | — | 1–1 | 1–0 | 0–0 | 3–0 | 2–1 | 1–1 | 0–0 | 1–1 | 0–2 | — | 5–3 | 3–1 | 7–0 | 5–0 | 4–0 | 3–0 | 1–0 | 0–2 | 0–0 |
| Grbalj | 0–1 | — | 0–0 | 0–1 | 2–0 | 0–1 | 4–0 | 0–1 | 0–1 | 1–1 | 1–1 | — | 2–1 | 3–2 | 4–0 | 1–0 | 2–0 | 1–1 | 0–0 | 0–0 |
| Iskra | 0–1 | 0–0 | — | 1–3 | 2–0 | 0–1 | 0–1 | 1–1 | 0–4 | 1–2 | 0–0 | 1–1 | — | 2–0 | 1–1 | 2–3 | 2–1 | 5–1 | 1–1 | 0–1 |
| Lovćen | 0–0 | 0–5 | 0–2 | — | 0–1 | 2–2 | 1–3 | 1–3 | 1–1 | 0–2 | 1–1 | 1–1 | 1–2 | — | 1–0 | 1–3 | 1–3 | 0–1 | 1–3 | 1–0 |
| Mornar | 0–1 | 1–1 | 1–1 | 2–4 | — | 0–1 | 0–1 | 1–1 | 0–1 | 0–0 | 0–1 | 2–4 | 1–3 | 0–0 | — | 0–3 | 1–5 | 0–0 | 0–3 | 0–3 |
| OFK Titograd | 1–0 | 0–2 | 1–1 | 0–0 | 1–0 | — | 3–0 | 0–0 | 0–0 | 2–1 | 1–2 | 2–2 | 1–2 | 3–2 | 6–1 | — | 1–1 | 1–0 | 0–1 | 0–2 |
| Petrovac | 1–1 | 0–1 | 1–2 | 1–0 | 1–0 | 1–2 | — | 3–1 | 1–0 | 0–1 | 0–0 | 3–3 | 0–4 | 0–0 | 2–1 | 0–1 | — | 3–2 | 0–1 | 0–2 |
| Rudar | 2–1 | 0–0 | 0–0 | 0–0 | 1–1 | 3–1 | 0–4 | — | 1–2 | 0–0 | 2–2 | 3–0 | 1–1 | 2–1 | 3–1 | 2–2 | 0–1 | — | 1–1 | 1–1 |
| Sutjeska | 2–1 | 3–0 | 1–2 | 1–1 | 1–1 | 3–0 | 2–1 | 2–0 | — | 0–1 | 2–2 | 2–0 | 2–0 | 4–0 | 2–1 | 1–2 | 2–1 | 4–0 | — | 1–0 |
| Zeta | 0–1 | 0–0 | 1–3 | 3–0 | 2–0 | 1–0 | 0–0 | 0–0 | 0–0 | — | 0–3 | 1–0 | 0–2 | 3–2 | 2–0 | 1–1 | 0–0 | 2–1 | 1–1 | — |

Source: Football Association of Montenegro (in Montenegrin), Soccerway
Legend: Blue = home team win; Yellow = draw; Red = away team win.
For upcoming matches, an "a" indicates there is an article about the rivalry between the two participants.

== Relegation play-offs ==
The 10th-placed team (against the 3rd-placed team of the Second League) and the 11th-placed team (against the runners-up of the Second League) will both compete in two-legged relegation play-offs after the end of the season.

=== Summary ===
| Team 1 | Agg. | Team 2 | 1st leg | 2nd leg |
|---|---|---|---|---|
| Bokelj | 1–4 | Rudar | 0–2 | 1–2 |
| Lovćen | 0–2 | Kom | 0–1 | 0–1 |

=== Matches ===
29 May 2019
17:30 CEST

| Bokelj | 0–2 | Rudar |
|---|---|---|
| | Report | Nya-Vedji 41'; Zečević 78' |

Stadion pod Vrmcem, Kotor
Attendance: 600
Referee: Jovan Kaluđerović
2 June 2019
17:30 CEST

| Rudar | 2–1 | Bokelj |
|---|---|---|
| Grbić 11' (o.g.); Vukić 56' | Report | Pepić 9' |

Gradski stadion, Pljevlja
Attendance: 500
Referee: Miloš Savović

Rudar won 4–1 on aggregate.

4 June 2019
17:30 CEST

| Lovćen | 0–1 | Kom |
|---|---|---|
| | Report | Gardašević 3' |

Stadion pod Vrmcem, Kotor
Attendance: 500
Referee: Predrag Radovanović
10 June 2019
17:30 CEST

| Kom | 1–0 | Lovćen |
|---|---|---|
| Gardašević 62' | Report |

Stadion Zlatica, Podgorica
Attendance: 800
Referee: Predrag Radovanović

Kom won 2–0 on aggregate.

== Top scorers ==
| Rank | Scorer | Club | Goals |
|---|---|---|---|
| 1 | (Montenegro) Nikola Krstović | Zeta | 17 |
| 2 | (Montenegro) Vladan Kordić | Grbalj | 12 |
| 2 | (Montenegro) Božo Marković | Sutjeska | 12 |
| 2 | (Montenegro) Darko Nikač | Iskra | 12 |
| 2 | (Montenegro) Aleksandar Vujačić | Budućnost | 12 |
| 6 | (Serbia) Marko Pavićević | Titograd | 11 |
| 7 | (Montenegro) Radomir Đalović | Rudar | 10 |
| 8 | (Montenegro) Stefan Milošević | Iskra | 9 |
| 8 | (Montenegro) Vojin Pavlović | Titograd | 9 |
| 10 | (Montenegro) Miloš Mijić | Budućnost | 8 |
| 10 | (Montenegro) Goran Vujović | Lovćen | 8 |

== See also ==
- Montenegrin First League
