= 2019–20 Montenegrin First League =

Montenegrin First League
- Season: 2019–20
- Dates: 3 August 2019 – 30 June 2020
- Champions: Budućnost; 4th title
- Relegated: Kom; Grbalj
- Champions League: Budućnost
- Europa League: Sutjeska; Iskra; Zeta
- Matches: 155
- Goals: 382 (2.46 per match)
- Top goalscorer: Marko Ćetković (10 goals)
- Biggest home win: Kom 5–0 Rudar (18 September 2019); Sutjeska 5–0 Grbalj (22 September 2019)
- Biggest away win: 4 matches: Rudar 0–4 Sutjeska (18 August 2019); Petrovac 0–4 Sutjeska (23 November 2019); Grbalj 0–4 Budućnost (15 December 2019); Rudar 0–4 Budućnost (16 June 2020)
- Highest scoring: Sutjeska 4–2 Iskra (28 August 2019); Podgorica 4–2 Kom (22 September 2019); Rudar 5–1 Sutjeska (29 February 2020)

The 2019–20 Montenegrin First League was the 14th season of the top-tier association football in Montenegro. The season began on 3 August 2019 and ended on 30 June 2020. The league winners qualified for a place in the 2020–21 UEFA Champions League.

Sutjeska were the defending champions after winning the league in the previous season. The season was suspended on 13 March 2020 due to COVID-19 pandemic in Montenegro, then later resumed on 1 June 2020.

== Teams ==
Mornar and Lovćen were relegated at the end of the previous season. After earning promotion from the Montenegrin Second League, FK Podgorica and Kom competed in the league this season.
The following 10 clubs competed in 2019–20 First League.

2019–20 clubs

| Team | City | Stadium | Capacity | Coach |
|---|---|---|---|---|
| Budućnost | Podgorica | Stadion pod Goricom | 15,230 | (Serbia) Mladen Milinković |
| Grbalj | Radanovići | Stadion Donja Sutvara | 1,500 | (Serbia) Marko Vidojević |
| Iskra | Danilovgrad | Braća Velašević Stadium | 2,500 | (Montenegro) Aleksandar Nedović |
| Kom | Podgorica | Stadion Zlatica | 1,200 | (Montenegro) Radislav Dragićević |
| Petrovac | Petrovac | Stadion pod Malim brdom | 1,630 | (Montenegro) Nenad Vukčević |
| FK Podgorica | Podgorica | DG Arena | 4,000 | (Montenegro) Vojislav Pejović |
| Rudar | Pljevlja | Stadion pod Golubinjom | 5,140 | (Montenegro) Damir Čakar |
| Sutjeska | Nikšić | Stadion kraj Bistrice | 5,214 | (Montenegro) Nikola Rakojević |
| OFK Titograd | Podgorica | Mladost Stadium | 1,250 | (Serbia) Zoran Govedarica |
| Zeta | Golubovci | Stadion Trešnjica | 4,000 | (Montenegro) Dejan Roganović |

== League table ==
| Pos | Team | Pld | W | D | L | GF | GA | GD | Pts | Qualification or relegation |
|---|---|---|---|---|---|---|---|---|---|---|
| 1 | Budućnost (C) | 31 | 23 | 4 | 4 | 63 | 26 | +37 | 73 | Qualification for the Champions League first qualifying round |
| 2 | Sutjeska | 31 | 15 | 10 | 6 | 57 | 31 | +26 | 55 | Qualification for the Europa League first qualifying round |
| 3 | Iskra | 31 | 15 | 8 | 8 | 43 | 33 | +10 | 53 | Qualification for the Europa League preliminary round |
| 4 | Zeta | 31 | 9 | 14 | 8 | 29 | 30 | −1 | 41 | Qualification for the Europa League preliminary round |
| 5 | Podgorica | 31 | 8 | 16 | 7 | 34 | 27 | +7 | 40 | |
| 6 | Petrovac | 31 | 9 | 10 | 12 | 30 | 46 | −16 | 37 | |
| 7 | Rudar | 31 | 10 | 5 | 16 | 38 | 57 | −19 | 35 | |
| 8 | OFK Titograd (O) | 31 | 7 | 10 | 14 | 29 | 38 | −9 | 31 | Qualification for the relegation play-offs |
| 9 | Kom (R) | 31 | 6 | 11 | 14 | 36 | 45 | −9 | 29 | Qualification for the relegation play-offs |
| 10 | Grbalj (R) | 31 | 4 | 10 | 17 | 23 | 49 | −26 | 22 | Relegation to the Second League |

Source: Football Association of Montenegro (in Montenegrin), UEFA, Soccerway
Rules for classification: 1) Points; 2) Head-to-head points; 3) Head-to-head goal difference; 3) Head-to-head goals scored; 5) Head-to-head away goals scored; 6) Goal difference; 7) Goals scored; 8) Draw.
(C) Champions; (O) Play-off winners; (R) Relegated

== Results ==
Clubs were originally scheduled to play each other four times for a total of 36 matches each.

| Home \ Away | BUD | GRB | ISK | KOM | OFK | PET | POD | RUD | SUT | ZET | BUD | GRB | ISK | KOM | OFK | PET | POD | RUD | SUT | ZET |
|---|---|---|---|---|---|---|---|---|---|---|---|---|---|---|---|---|---|---|---|---|
| Budućnost | — | 3–2 | 1–0 | 3–1 | 2–1 | 3–0 | 1–0 | 2–0 | 1–4 | 1–1 | — | 1–0 | — | 2–0 | — | 1–1 | 1–0 | 2–0 | 2–0 | 4–1 |
| Grbalj | 0–4 | — | 2–3 | 1–1 | 0–2 | 1–2 | 1–1 | 2–2 | 1–1 | 0–0 | — | — | 3–1 | 0–1 | 0–0 | 0–0 | 0–0 | 1–0 | — | 0–2 |
| Iskra | 2–2 | 1–0 | — | 0–2 | 0–0 | 1–2 | 2–1 | 2–0 | 2–0 | 3–1 | 4–1 | 2–1 | — | 2–0 | 3–0 | — | — | 0–2 | 1–0 | 3–1 |
| Kom | 2–3 | 1–1 | 1–1 | — | 1–2 | 3–2 | 1–1 | 5–0 | 1–1 | 0–0 | 0–1 | 0–1 | — | — | — | 0–1 | — | 1–1 | 3–3 | 1–0 |
| OFK Titograd | 2–1 | 1–0 | 0–1 | 3–1 | — | 1–2 | 1–2 | 0–1 | 0–1 | 0–1 | 1–3 | — | 2–1 | 2–3 | — | — | 0–0 | 1–3 | 1–1 | 0–0 |
| Petrovac | 0–3 | 2–0 | 0–1 | 2–1 | 0–3 | — | 1–1 | 1–4 | 0–4 | 0–2 | 0–1 | — | 4–1 | 1–0 | 1–1 | — | 1–1 | — | — | 2–2 |
| Podgorica | 1–3 | 1–1 | 0–0 | 4–2 | 0–0 | 1–0 | — | 3–0 | 2–2 | 2–0 | 1–1 | 2–0 | 0–0 | 1–1 | 1–1 | 1–1 | — | — | — | — |
| Rudar | 0–3 | 1–3 | 1–1 | 3–2 | 3–1 | 4–0 | 2–1 | — | 0–4 | 1–1 | 0–4 | 3–1 | — | — | 1–1 | 0–2 | 0–3 | — | 5–1 | — |
| Sutjeska | 0–2 | 5–0 | 4–2 | 2–0 | 1–1 | 3–0 | 1–2 | 3–0 | — | 2–1 | — | 4–1 | 1–1 | — | 3–1 | 0–0 | 1–0 | 2–0 | — | 0–0 |
| Zeta | 2–1 | 2–0 | 0–1 | 0–0 | 1–0 | 1–1 | 1–0 | 2–1 | 0–0 | — | — | — | 1–1 | 1–1 | — | 1–1 | 1–1 | 2–0 | 1–3 | — |

Source: Football Association of Montenegro (in Montenegrin), Soccerway
Legend: Blue = home team win; Yellow = draw; Red = away team win.
For upcoming matches, an "a" indicates there is an article about the rivalry between the two participants.

== Relegation play-offs ==
The 10th-placed team (against the 3rd-placed team of the Second League) and the 11th-placed team (against the runners-up of the Second League) will both compete in two-legged relegation play-offs after the end of the season.

=== Summary ===
| Team 1 | Agg. | Team 2 | 1st leg | 2nd leg |
|---|---|---|---|---|
| Kom | 2–3 | Jezero | 1–0 | 1–3 |
| OFK Titograd | 1–1 (5–4 p) | Bokelj | 0–1 | 1–0 |

=== Matches ===
10 July 2020
20:00 CEST

| Kom | 1–0 | Jezero |
|---|---|---|
| Vlahović 90+4' | Report |

Stadion Zlatica, Podgorica
Referee: Predrag Radovanović
14 July 2020
18:30 CEST

| Jezero | 3–1 | Kom |
|---|---|---|
| Radenović 43'; Drešković 71'; Milačić 79' | Report | Golubović 57' |

Stadion Pod Racinom, Plav
Referee: Jovan Kaluđerović

Jezero won 3–2 on aggregate.

10 July 2020
21:00 CEST

| OFK Titograd | 0–1 | Bokelj |
|---|---|---|
| | Report | Bošković 18' |

Mladost Stadium, Podgorica
Referee: Mileta Šćepanović
14 July 2020
18:30 CEST

| Bokelj | 0–1 | OFK Titograd |
|---|---|---|
| | Report | Novović 63' (pen.) |
Penalties
| Stevović (penalty scored); Bakić (penalty scored); Sekulović (penalty scored); Babić (penalty missed); Poček (penalty scored); Marveggio (penalty missed) | 4–5 | (penalty scored) Novović; (penalty scored) Adrović; (penalty missed) Roganović; (penalty scored) Muzurović; (penalty scored) Bojović; (penalty scored) Banović |

Stadion pod Vrmcem, Kotor
Referee: Predrag Radovanović

1–1 on aggregate. OFK Titograd won on penalties.

== Top scorers ==
| Rank | Scorer | Club | Goals |
|---|---|---|---|
| 1 | (Montenegro) Marko Ćetković | Sutjeska | 10 |
| 2 | (Montenegro) Draško Božović | Budućnost | 9 |
| 2 | (Montenegro) Boban Đorđević | Grbalj | 9 |
| 2 | (Montenegro) Igor Ivanović | Budućnost | 9 |
| 2 | (Montenegro) Sava Gardašević | Kom | 9 |
| 2 | (Montenegro) Velizar Janketić | Rudar | 9 |
| 2 | (Montenegro) Božo Marković | Sutjeska | 9 |
| 8 | (Montenegro) Damir Kojašević | Sutjeska | 8 |
| 8 | (Montenegro) Boris Kopitović | Petrovac | 8 |
| 8 | (Greece) Panagiotis Moraitis | Budućnost | 8 |
| 8 | (Montenegro) Stefan Nikolić | Sutjeska | 8 |
| 8 | (Montenegro) Vule Vujačić | Rudar | 8 |

== See also ==
- Montenegrin First League
