= Luka Pejović (footballer, born 1985) =

Montenegrin footballer

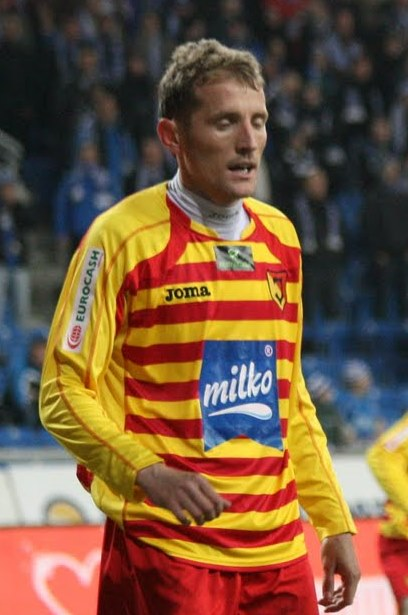

Personal information
- Full name: Luka Pejović
- Date of birth: 31 July 1985 (age 41)
- Place of birth: Titograd, SFR Yugoslavia
- Height: 1.84 m (6 ft 0 in)
- Position: Left-back

Youth career
- Budućnost Podgorica

Senior career*
Years	Team	Apps	(Gls)
2004–2005	Crvena Stijena		
2006–2007	Grbalj	45	(2)
2007–2010	Mogren	96	(1)
2011–2012	Jagiellonia Białystok	37	(0)
2013–2014	Mogren	24	(0)
2014–2017	Mladost Podgorica	60	(0)
2017–2019	Iskra Danilovgrad	79	(1)
2020	Lovćen	11	(0)
Total		352	(4)

International career
2007–2012	Montenegro	23	(1)
- * Club domestic league appearances and goals

Luka Pejović (Montenegrin Cyrillic: Лука Пејовић; born 31 July 1985) is a Montenegrin former professional footballer who played as a left-back.

== Club career ==
After starting his senior career at FK Crvena Stijena, Pejović played for OFK Grbalj for one year then was bought by FK Mogren in 2007. He won Best Montenegrin Footballer in the league award for the year 2007, alongside ex teammate Aleksandar Nedović. He was also part of Mogren team that won the National Championship in the 2008–09 season.

In January 2011, he joined Polish club Jagiellonia Białystok on a four-and-a-half-year contract. In January 2017 he made a deal with Montenegrin club FK Iskra Danilovgrad and he was a third player to come in this club (after Miroje Jovanović and Semir Agović).

== International career ==
Pejović made his debut for Montenegro against Japan on 1 June 2007 as Montenegro lost 2–0. He has earned a total of 23 caps, scoring 1 goal. His final international was a February 2012 friendly match against Iceland.

== Career statistics ==
=== International ===
Appearances and goals by national team and year
National team	Year	Apps	Goals
Montenegro	2007	5	0
Montenegro	2008	4	0
Montenegro	2009	7	0
Montenegro	2010	4	1
Montenegro	2011	2	0
Montenegro	2012	1	0
Total		23	1

Scores and results list Montenegro goal tally first, score column indicates score after each Pejović goal.

List of international goals scored by Luka Pejović
No.	Date	Venue	Opponent	Score	Result	Competition
1	17 November 2010	Podgorica City Stadium, Podgorica, Montenegro	Azerbaijan	1–0	2–0	Friendly

== Honours ==
Mogren

- Montenegrin First League: 2008–09
- Montenegrin Cup: 2007–08

Mladost Podgorica

- Montenegrin First League: 2015–16
- Montenegrin Cup: 2014–15
