= Balša Sekulić =

Montenegrin footballer

Personal information
- Date of birth: 10 June 1998 (age 28)
- Place of birth: Cetinje, Montenegro, FR Yugoslavia
- Height: 1.83 m (6 ft 0 in)
- Position: Forward

Team information
- Current team: Persib Bandung
- Number: 99

Senior career*
Years	Team	Apps	(Gls)
2016–2017	Cetinje	7	(0)
2017–2019	Budućnost Podgorica	32	(3)
2019	→ Titograd (loan)	13	(2)
2019–2021	Podgorica	55	(7)
2021–2022	Iskra Danilovgrad	33	(13)
2022–2023	Gangwon	18	(2)
2023–2024	Budućnost Podgorica	47	(12)
2024	Metallurg Bekabad	9	(1)
2025–2026	Mornar	48	(22)
2026–	Persib Bandung	9	(6)

International career^{‡}
2017–2020	Montenegro U21	10	(1)
2022–	Montenegro	5	(1)
- * Club domestic league appearances and goals as of 8 November 2026 ‡ National team caps and goals as of 5 June 2026

Balša Sekulić (Montenegrin: Балша Секулић; born 10 June 1998) is a Montenegrin professional footballer who plays as a forward for Super League club Persib Bandung.

== Club career ==
=== Gangwon ===
On 18 June 2022, Sekulić joined K League 1 side Gangwon.

=== Persib Bandung ===
In July 2026, he officially joined Persib Bandung to begin playing in the 2026–27 Super League.

On 28 October 2026, Sekulić scored twice in a 2–0 home victory over Melbourne Victory in the 2026–27 AFC Champions League Two. On 4 November 2026, he scored the winning goal in a 2–1 away victory against the same opponents.

== Career statistics ==
=== Club ===
As of match played 8 November 2026

Appearances and goals by club, season and competition
Club	Season	League			National Cup		Continental		Other		Total	
Club	Season	Division	Apps	Goals	Apps	Goals	Apps	Goals	Apps	Goals	Apps	Goals
Cetinje	2016–17	Montenegrin Second League	7	0	0	0	—		—		7	0
Budućnost Podgorica	2016–17	Montenegrin First League	5	0	0	0	—		—		5	0
Budućnost Podgorica	2017–18	Montenegrin First League	17	3	4	1	0	0	—		21	4
Budućnost Podgorica	2018–19	Montenegrin First League	10	0	1	0	2 (Note: Appearances in UEFA Europa League qualifying rounds)	0	—		12	0
Budućnost Podgorica	Total		32	3	5	1	2	0	—		39	4
Titograd (loan)	2018–19	Montenegrin First League	13	2	0	0	—		—		13	2
Podgorica	2019–20	Montenegrin First League	31	5	2	0	—		—		33	5
Podgorica	2020–21	Montenegrin First League	24	2	1	0	—		—		25	2
Podgorica	Total		55	7	3	0	—		—		58	7
Iskra Danilovgrad	2021–22	Montenegrin First League	33	13	1	0	—		—		34	13
Gangwon	2022	K League 1	18	2	0	0	—		—		21	1
Budućnost Podgorica	2022–23	Montenegrin First League	16	6	—		—		—		16	6
Budućnost Podgorica	2023–24	Montenegrin First League	31	6	4	2	3 (Note: Two appearances in UEFA Champions League qualifying rounds, one appearance in UEFA Conference qualifying rounds)	2	—		38	10
Budućnost Podgorica	Total		47	12	4	2	3	2	—		54	16
Metallurg Bekabad	2024	Uzbekistan Super League	9	1	—		—		0	0	9	1
Mornar	2024–25	Montenegrin First League	16	7	3	1	—		—		19	8
Mornar	2025–26	Montenegrin First League	32	15	4	1	—		—		36	16
Persib Bandung	2026–27	Super League	8	4	0	0	5 (Note: Appearances in AFC Champions League Two)	3	1 (Note: Appearances in ASEAN Club Championship)	0	14	7
Career total			270	66	20	5	10	5	1	0	301	76

=== International ===
As of match played 5 June 2026

Appearances and goals by national team and year
National team	Year	Apps	Goals
Montenegro	2022	1	0
Montenegro	2026	4	1
Total		5	1

Scores and results list Slovakia's goal tally first, score column indicates score after each Sekulić goal.

List of international goals scored by Balša Sekulić
No.	Date	Venue	Opponent	Score	Result	Competition
1	1 June 2026	Stadion Hristo Botev, Plovdiv, Bulgaria	Bulgaria	1–0	1–0	Friendly

== Honours ==
FK Budućnost

- Montenegrin First League: 2016–17, 2022–23

FK Mornar

- Montenegrin Cup: 2025–26

Persib Bandung

- Piala Presiden runner-up: 2026

Individual

- Montenegrin First League top scorer: 2025–26
