= Ilija Tučević =

Montenegrin footballer

Personal information
- Date of birth: 18 October 1995 (age 31)
- Place of birth: Radanovići, FR Yugoslavia
- Height: 1.81 m (5 ft 11 in)
- Position: Defender

Team information
- Current team: Jezero
- Number: 17

Senior career*
Years	Team	Apps	(Gls)
2012–2017	Grbalj	73	(14)
2017–2019	Budućnost	63	(6)
2019–2020	Armavir	13	(2)
2020–2021	Rad	17	(1)
2021–2022	Iskra	28	(1)
2022–2024	Sutjeska Nikšić	23	(0)
2024	Arsenal Tivat	10	(0)
2025	Grbalj	11	(1)
2025–	Jezero	32	(0)

International career^{‡}
2013–2014	Montenegro U-19	3	(0)
2015–2016	Montenegro U-21	7	(0)
- * Club domestic league appearances and goals as of 25 May 2026 ‡ National team caps and goals as of 7 October 2016

Ilija Tučević (born 18 October 1995) is a Montenegrin football player who is currently playing for Jezero.

== Club career ==
Tučević started his career at hometown club Grbalj and joined Budućnost Podgorica in summer 2017. On 13 August 2019 he signed with Russian club FC Armavir.

He made his Russian Football National League debut for FC Armavir on 7 September 2019 in a game against FC Nizhny Novgorod, he substituted Denis Kutin in the 64th minute.
