= Slobodan Mazić =

Serbian footballer

Personal information
- Full name: Slobodan Mazić
- Date of birth: November 15, 1977 (age 48)
- Place of birth: Vlasenica, SFR Yugoslavia
- Height: 1.81 m (5 ft 11 1/2 in)
- Position: Right-back

Senior career*
Years	Team	Apps	(Gls)
1996–1999	Radnički Bajmok	51	(4)
1999–2001	Spartak Subotica	47	(3)
2001–2002	OFK Beograd	9	(0)
2002–2004	Slavija Sarajevo	59	(9)
2004–2005	Digenis Morphou	31	(2)
2005–2006	Spartak Subotica	17	(0)
2006–2007	DAC Dunajská Streda	9	(0)
2007–2009	Grbalj	57	(0)
2009–2011	Budućnost Podgorica	55	(2)
2011	Bačka Topola	9	(2)
2012-2016	SVSF Pottschach	107	(89)
2016-2018	SV Bad Erlach	48	(15)
2018	FC Sankt Egyden	10	(3)
Total		503	(97)
- * Club domestic league appearances and goals

Slobodan Mazić (Serbian Cyrillic: Слободан Мазић; born November 15, 1977) is a Serbian retired footballer.

== Career ==
Throughout his career, Mazić played for Serbian Radnički Bajmok, Spartak Subotica and OFK Beograd, Bosnian-Serb Slavija Sarajevo, Cypriot Digenis Morphou, DAC Dunajská Streda, and Montenegrin Grbalj and Budućnost Podgorica, Bačka Topola, SVSF Pottschach.
