= OFK Titograd =

Montenegrin association football club

Coordinates: 42°25′37.0″N 19°16′53.9″E

- Full name: Omladinski fudbalski klub Titograd
- Nicknames: Romantičari (The Romantics); Crveni (The Reds)
- Short name: TGD
- Founded: 1951; 75 years ago
- Ground: Mladost Stadium (at Camp FSCG); Podgorica, Montenegro
- Capacity: 1,250
- Chairman: Momčilo Vujošević
- Manager: Ivan Jević
- League: Montenegrin Third League
- 2024–25: Montenegrin Third League Center, 6th of 11
- Website: ofktitograd.me
Home colours	Away colours

OFK Titograd (Montenegrin Cyrillic: ОФК Титоград) is a professional football club based in Podgorica, Montenegro. Founded in 1951, they play in the Third League of Montenegro. The team has one league trophy and two Montenegrin Cup trophies. OFK Titograd is a member of the European Club Association.

== History ==
OFK Titograd was formed in 1951 as FK Mladost. Ten years later, the team changed their name to OFK Titograd, which was the name of Podgorica from 1946 until 1992. The club renamed themselves back to Mladost in 1992. In June 2018, the team renamed once again (OFK Titograd), due to respect to older generations and the tradition of Podgorica. Until 2008, and moving to their new stadium at Camp FSCG, Ćemovsko polje, it was the only club from old Podgorica Town (Drač neighbourhood).

Period	Name	Full name
1951–1960	FK Mladost	Fudbalski klub "Mladost" Titograd
1960–1992	OFK Titograd	Omladinski fudbalski klub "Titograd"
1992–2018	FK Mladost	Fudbalski klub "Mladost" Podgorica
2018–	OFK Titograd	Omladinski fudbalski klub "Titograd"

=== 1951–2006 ===
FK Mladost, which means Youth in Montenegrin, was founded in 1951 as a second team from Podgorica center (the first was Yugoslav top-tier side FK Budućnost).

Soon after they were formed, FK Mladost gained promotion from the Montenegrin Republic League to the Yugoslav Second League. Their first season in the Second League was in 1955–56, where the team spent three consecutive seasons.

In period 1959–1968, the team played only in the Montenegrin Republic League (third-tier competition in SFR Yugoslavia) with five champion titles. But, as a champion, team from Podgorica did not succeed in making a comeback to the Second League with losing their games in inter-republic playoffs, against the teams from Macedonia and Serbia. Finally, the team under the name OFK Titograd gained promotion to the 1968–69 Yugoslav Second League .

This time, they played six consecutive seasons in the Second League, from season 1968–69 to 1973–74. At that era, OFK Titograd played first official games against oldest and better-known city rivals from FK Budućnost. Best result at that time OFK Titograd made at season 1971–72, by winning fifth place at the Second League table.

After the few promotions and relegations at the second half of the 1970s, OFK Titograd played another four consecutive seasons in Yugoslav Second League from 1979–80 to 1982–83. That was their last biggest successes under the name OFK Titograd. In 1992, the name of the team was changed and FK Mladost started to play in the football system of the newly formed FR Yugoslavia. Most of their seasons in period 1992–2006, Mladost spent in FR Yugoslavia Second League.

In September 1997, FK Mladost made a record win in history during a Montenegrin Republic League match against FK Iskra Danilovgrad 15–0.

During the SFR Yugoslavia and FR Yugoslavia times, Mladost spent 24 seasons in the Second League. At the same time, the team won 12 titles of the Montenegrin Republic League winner, which is the best score of any team in that competition.

At the same time, Mladost won five Montenegrin Republic Cups, and played in the Yugoslav Cup. Their biggest success in the Yugoslav Cup, came on season 2001-02 – in the 1/16 finals, they won against Napredak Kruševac, but Mladost were eliminated in the 1/8 finals, away against Radnički Obrenovac. Same success, Mladost made on season 2005-06. In the first phase of Cup of Serbia and Montenegro, Mladost surprisingly won against the First League member Voždovac (2–1), and in the 1/8 finals, club from Podgorica lost in last minutes against most successful Serbian club Crvena Zvezda in Belgrade (1–2).

=== 2006–present ===
Following the independence of Montenegro, Montenegro's best clubs joined the newly formed Montenegrin First League. Among them was FK Mladost, who previously won the playoff game against Zora Spuž (4–0, 0–2).

Mladost played two consecutive seasons in the First League, but relegated to the Second League at summer 2008. A new come-back to top-tier competition Mladost made at season 2010-11. Since then, FK Mladost played more important role in Montenegrin football.

In the 2012–13 Montenegrin Cup, Mladost won a game against Pljevlja 10–1, and the striker Luka Rotković scored seven goals, which is a record in all official games played in Montenegro.

First greatest result, Mladost made at season 2012–13, when they gained historical first promotion to UEFA European competitions. Team from Podgorica played in the 2013–14 UEFA Europa League and achieved a surprisingly good result. In the First leg, Mladost eliminated Hungarian-side Videoton (1–0; 1–2) and in the Second Leg they were better against Slovak team Senica (2–2; 1–0). In Round 3, Mladost played against Sevilla FC with defeats in both games (1–6; 0–3).

For the first time, Mladost played in Montenegrin Cup final game at season 2013–14, but were defeated against Lovćen (0–1). Next season, Mladost again participated in the Cup finals, but this time won the trophy, after extra-time win against Petrovac (2–1). That was the first national trophy in the history of the club.

With that success, Mladost gained another participation in European competitions - 2015–16 UEFA Europa League. In the First round, Mladost made a big surprise, eliminating Neftchi Baku (1–1; 2–2). At the next phase, Mladost were eliminated by neighbouring side Kukësi (2–4; 1–0).

The most significant result in the club's history, Mladost made at 2015–16 Montenegrin First League. After the hard struggle with city-rivals from FK Budućnost, Mladost won the title of Montenegrin champion, the very first in their history. Mladost made great success with winning all three championship derby games against Budućnost (2–0; 3–1; 2–1).

In summer 2016, Mladost played their first season in the UEFA Champions League, but were eliminated in the beginning of qualifiers, against Ludogorets Razgrad (0–3; 0–2).

Third national trophy in teams' history, Mladost won in the 2017–18 Montenegrin Cup. During the competition, they eliminated city-rivals - FK Budućnost and in the Cup finals won against Igalo (2–0). With that success and with the old name (OFK Titograd), the team earned a place in the 2018–19 UEFA Europa League qualifying rounds.

=== Talent producing ===
Since foundation, OFK Titograd was known as a talent producing team, with great work with youth teams. In period 1951–1990, OFK Titograd functioned as a youth players 'factory' of First League side FK Budućnost Podgorica. Many notable players started their careers in OFK Titograd youth or first team, and among them are Dejan Savićević, Niša Saveljić, Predrag Mijatović and Stevan Jovetić. Two of them won the UEFA Champions League trophies - Savićević with AC Milan and Mijatović with Real Madrid, while Jovetić won UEFA Conference League with Olympiacos.

=== First League Record ===
For the first time, OFK Titograd played in the Montenegrin First League in the 2006–07 season. Below is a list of OFK Titograd scores in the First League by every single season.

Season	Pos	G	W	D	L	GF	GA
2006–07	9	33	9	11	13	34	49
2007–08	12	33	4	7	22	16	44
2010–11	5	33	10	11	12	36	35
2011–12	7	33	10	7	16	32	45
2012–13	6	33	9	12	12	39	48
2013–14	9	33	11	6	16	38	46
2014–15	4	33	16	9	8	53	36
2015–16	1	33	21	4	8	53	28
2016–17	3	33	16	9	8	46	22
2017–18	3	36	12	15	9	42	33
2018–19	4	36	16	9	11	47	41
2019–20	8	31	7	10	14	29	38
2020–21	10	36	7	10	19	23	51

=== OFK Titograd in European competitions ===
OFK Titograd made their debut in European competitions during the 2013–14 season.

Season	Competition	Round	Club	Home	Away	Aggregate
2013–14	UEFA Europa League	1Q	(Hungary) Videoton	1–0	1–2	2–2 (a)
2013–14	UEFA Europa League	2Q	(Slovakia) Senica	2–2	1–0	3–2
2013–14	UEFA Europa League	3Q	(Spain) Sevilla	1–6	0–3	1–9
2015–16	UEFA Europa League	1Q	(Azerbaijan) Neftchi Baku	1–1	2–2	3–3 (a)
2015–16	UEFA Europa League	2Q	(Albania) Kukësi	2–4	1–0	3–4
2016–17	UEFA Champions League	2Q	(Bulgaria) Ludogorets Razgrad	0–3	0–2	0–5
2017–18	UEFA Europa League	1Q	(Armenia) Gandzasar	1–0	3–0	4–0
2017–18	UEFA Europa League	2Q	(Austria) Sturm Graz	0–3	1–0	1–3
2018–19	UEFA Europa League	1Q	(Faroe Islands) B36 Tórshavn	1–2	0−0	1–2
2019–20	UEFA Europa League	1Q	(Bulgaria) CSKA Sofia	0−0	0–4	0−4

=== Records ===
- Biggest victory: FK Mladost - Iskra 15:0 (26 September 1998, Montenegrin Republic League)
- Biggest defeat: Crvena Zvezda - FK Mladost 10:1 (15 August 1998, Yugoslav Cup)
- Most goals by single season: 118 (Montenegrin Republic League 1998-99)
- Player with most goals in a single game: 7 - Luka Rotković vs. Pljevlja (24 October 2012, Montenegrin Cup)
- Biggest home attendance: 6,000, FK Mladost - Sturm Graz (20 July 2017, UEFA Europe League)
- Biggest away attendance: 27,548, Sevilla - FK Mladost (1 August 2013, UEFA Europe League).

== Honours and achievements ==
- Montenegrin First League – 1
  - Champions (1): 2015–16
- Montenegrin Cup – 2
  - Winners (2): 2014–15, 2017–18
  - Runners-up (1): 2013–14
- Montenegrin Second League – 1
  - Champions (1): 2009–10
  - Runners-up (1): 2008–09
- Montenegrin Republic League – 12
  - Champions (12): 1958–59, 1960–61, 1961–62, 1963–64, 1966–67, 1967–68, 1974–75, 1978–79, 1983–84, 1986–87, 1990–91, 1998–99
  - Runners-up (6): 1954–55, 1964–65, 1965–66, 1976–77, 1994–95, 2005–06
- Montenegrin Republic Cup – 5
  - Winners (5): 1965–66, 1975–76, 1982–83, 1997–98, 2002–03

== Players ==
=== Current squad ===
As of 3 October 2025

Note: Flags indicate national team as defined under FIFA eligibility rules; some limited exceptions apply. Players may hold more than one non-FIFA nationality.

No.	Pos.	Nation	Player
12	GK	MNE	Ivan Zlajić
21	MF	MNE	Luka Boričić
24	MF	MNE	Pavle Savkovic
30	MF	JPN	Masato Shimokawa

No.	Pos.	Nation	Player
58	FW	MNE	Đorđe Magdelinić
77	DF	SRB	Igor Bašić
99	FW	MNE	Marko Mrvaljević
—	DF	MNE	Ljubomir Pejović
—	MF	MNE	Petar Mališić

=== Notable players ===
Below is the list of players which, during their career, played for OFK Titograd and represented their countries at the full international level.

- (Socialist Federal Republic of Yugoslavia) Dragoljub Brnović
- (Socialist Federal Republic of Yugoslavia) Branislav Drobnjak
- (Socialist Federal Republic of Yugoslavia) Saša Petrović
- (Socialist Federal Republic of Yugoslavia) Refik Šabanadžović
- (Socialist Federal Republic of Yugoslavia) (Serbia and Montenegro) Dejan Savićević
- (Serbia and Montenegro) Predrag Mijatović
- (Montenegro) Miloš Bakrač
- (Montenegro) Mladen Božović
- (Montenegro) Marko Ćetković
- (Montenegro) Ivan Delić
- (Montenegro) Miloš Dragojević
- (Montenegro) Petar Grbić
- (Montenegro) Blažo Igumanović
- (Montenegro) Ivan Ivanović
- (Montenegro) Miroje Jovanović
- (Montenegro) Stevan Jovetić
- (Montenegro) Vasko Kalezić
- (Montenegro) Damir Kojašević
- (Montenegro) Boris Kopitović
- (Montenegro) Šaleta Kordić
- (Montenegro) Miloš Krkotić
- (Montenegro) Edvin Kuč
- (Montenegro) Dušan Lagator
- (Montenegro) Risto Lakić
- (Montenegro) Luka Mirković
- (Montenegro) Stefan Mugoša
- (Montenegro) Darko Nikač
- (Montenegro) Luka Pejović
- (Montenegro) Rade Petrović
- (Montenegro) Mirko Raičević
- (Montenegro) Balša Sekulić
- (Montenegro) Janko Simović
- (Montenegro) Aleksandar Šofranac
- (Montenegro) Marko Vešović
- (Montenegro) Nedeljko Vlahović
- (Montenegro) Nikola Vukčević
- (Montenegro) Ivan Vuković
- (Liberia) Omega Roberts
- (Sierra Leone) Abdul Sesay

== Coaching staff ==
Position	Staff
Manager	(Serbia) Vladimir Janković

=== Historical list of coaches ===
- (Socialist Federal Republic of Yugoslavia) Slobodan Halilović (1982 - 1985)
- (Socialist Federal Republic of Yugoslavia) Slobodan Halilović (1987 - 1988)
- (Montenegro) Dimitrije Mitrović (2006 - Aug 2007)
- (Montenegro) Vojislav Pejović (30 Aug 2007 - Jan 2008)
- (Montenegro) Slobodan Šćepanoviċ (7 Jan 2008 - Jun 2010)
- (Montenegro) Miodrag Vukotić (Jul 2010 - May 2013)
- (Montenegro) Nikola Rakojević (Jun 2013 - Aug 2013)
- (Serbia) Goran Milojević (8 Aug 2013 - Mar 2014)
- (Montenegro) Radovan Kavaja (28 Mar 2014 - Jun 2014)
- (Montenegro) Aleksandar Nedović (Jul 2014 - Jun 2015)
- (Montenegro) Nikola Rakojević (Jul 2015 - Nov 2016)
- (Montenegro) Goran Perišić (26 Nov 2016 - 2 Apr 2017)
- (Montenegro) Dejan Vukićević (3 Apr 2017 - 25 Sep 2017)
- (Serbia) Branko Smiljanić (27 Sep 2017 - Nov 2017)
- (Montenegro) Veselin Stešević (Nov 2017 - 1 Apr 2018)
- (Montenegro) Aleksandar Miljenović (2 Apr 2018 - 20 Jul 2018)
- (Croatia) Igor Pamić (23 Jul 2018 - 30 Jan 2019)
- (Bosnia and Herzegovina) Edis Mulalić (31 Jan 2019 - 5 Mar 2019)
- (Austria) Peter Pacult (8 Mar 2019 - 5 Jun 2019)
- (Montenegro) Dragoljub Đuretić (13 Jun 2019 - 17 Nov 2019)
- (Serbia) Zoran Govedarica (19 Nov 2019 - 29 Aug 20)
- (Montenegro) Nikola Rakojević (7 Sep 2020 - 03 Apr 21 )
- (Serbia) Vladimir Janković (9 Apr 2020 - )

== Stadium ==
Since 2008, OFK Titograd is playing their home games at 'Mladost' stadium, which is a part of Camp FSCG at Stari Aerodrom neighbourhood. Stadium has a capacity of 1,250 seats and from 2019, floodlights were installed.
Before that, between 1951 and 2008, home of OFK Titograd was at Stadion Cvijetin Brijeg, at the Old Podgorica's neighbourhood Drač. But, because their stadium didn't meet criteria for higher-rank games, until 1998 Mladost played most of their games at Podgorica City Stadium.
At 1998, stadi um Cvijetin Brijeg was renovated, with two all-seated terraces with capacity of 1,340 seats, new pitch, modern locker rooms, restaurant and another facilities. Stadium was opened on August 31, 1998, with the game OFK Titograd – FK Cetinje 6–1.
During the decade (1998–08), on the stadium Cvijetin Brijeg, OFK Titograd played more than 200 matches in the Montenegrin First League, Yugoslav Second League, Montenegrin Republic League, Yugoslav Cup and the Montenegrin Cup. Stadium meets all necessary criteria for the First League, so, on Cvijetin Brijeg, few matches played FK Kom in First League of Serbia and Montenegro (2004–05) and FK Budućnost in Montenegrin First League (2006–07).

In 2008, stadium Cvijetin Brijeg was demolished and an elementary school was built in its place.

== See also ==
- List of OFK Titograd seasons
- Montenegrin First League
- Montenegrin clubs in Yugoslav football competitions (1946–2006)
- Podgorica
