= Danin Talović =

Montenegrin footballer

Personal information
- Full name: Danin Talović
- Date of birth: 8 March 1995 (age 31)
- Place of birth: Montenegro
- Height: 1.90 m (6 ft 3 in)
- Position: Attacking midfielder

Team information
- Current team: Otrant-Olympic
- Number: 20

Senior career*
Years	Team	Apps	(Gls)
2013–2015	Rudar Pljevlja	19	(0)
2015–2016	Jezero		
2016	Rudar Pljevlja		
2016	→ Jezero (loan)		
2016–2017	Berane	14	(5)
2017	Pljevlja 1997		
2017–2018	Lovćen	18	(2)
2018–2019	Rudar Pljevlja	5	(0)
2019	Jezero	11	(2)
2019–2020	Flamurtari	7	(2)
2020	Ibar	9	(6)
2020–2021	Rudar Pljevlja	33	(3)
2021–2022	Persikabo 1973	6	(0)
2022–2023	Rudar Pljevlja	23	(5)
2023	Dordoi Bishkek	26	(14)
2024	Safa	11	(5)
2024	Besa Dobërdoll	12	(0)
2025	Abdysh-Ata	11	(3)
2025–	Otrant-Olympic	25	(11)
- * Club domestic league appearances and goals as of 18 June 2026

Danin Talović (Serbian Cyrillic: Данин Таловић; born 8 March 1995) is a Montenegrin professional footballer who plays as an attacking midfielder for Otrant-Olympic.

== Career ==
On 4 March 2025, Talović was announced as part of Abdysh-Ata's squad for the 2025 season.

== Honours ==
Rudar Pljevlja

- Montenegrin First League: 2014–15
