= Luka Mirković =

Montenegrin footballer (born 1990)

Personal information
- Date of birth: 1 November 1990 (age 36)
- Height: 1.73 m (5 ft 8 in)
- Position: Midfielder

Team information
- Current team: Lovćen
- Number: 8

Senior career*
Years	Team	Apps	(Gls)
2008–2014	Lovćen	125	(5)
2014–2015	Mladost	33	(1)
2015–2025	Budućnost	268	(9)
2026–	Lovćen	10	(0)

International career^{‡}
2018–	Montenegro	4	(0)
- * Club domestic league appearances and goals as of 1 June 2026 ‡ National team caps and goals as of 19 April 2023

Luka Mirković (Serbian Cyrillic: Лука Мирковић; born 1 November 1990) is a Montenegrin professional footballer who plays as a midfielder for Lovćen.

== Club career ==
He has played club football for Lovćen, Mladost Podgorica and Budućnost Podgorica.

== International career ==
Mirković made his debut for Montenegro in a May 2018 friendly match against Bosnia and has, as of September 2020, earned a total of 3 caps, scoring no goals.
