= Predrag Jović =

Serbian footballer

Personal information
- Full name: Predrag Jović
- Date of birth: 29 May 1987 (age 39)
- Place of birth: Belgrade, SFR Yugoslavia
- Height: 1.95 m (6 ft 5 in)
- Position: Centre back

Team information
- Current team: Munja Barič

Senior career*
Years	Team	Apps	(Gls)
2005–2011	Radnički Obrenovac	114	(6)
2011–2013	Banat Zrenjanin	52	(2)
2013–2014	Inđija	24	(3)
2014–2015	Radnički Kragujevac	14	(1)
2015	Kolubara	5	(0)
2016	Inđija	13	(2)
2016–2017	Birkirkara	18	(1)
2017–2018	Proleter Novi Sad	5	(0)
2018–2019	Grbalj	49	(0)
2019–2021	Radnički Obrenovac		
2021–2023	Progres Ladovica		
2023-	Munja Barič		
- * Club domestic league appearances and goals as of 7 June 2018

Predrag Jović (Serbian Cyrillic: Предраг Јовић; born 29 May 1987) is a Serbian football defender who plays for Munja Barič.

== Career ==
Ahead of the 2019/20 season, Jović returned to FK Radnički Obrenovac.
