= Stefan Milošević (footballer, born 1996) =

Montenegrin footballer

Personal information
- Date of birth: 23 June 1996 (age 30)
- Place of birth: Nikšić, FR Yugoslavia
- Height: 1.90 m (6 ft 3 in)
- Position: Striker

Team information
- Current team: TransINVEST
- Number: 9

Youth career
- –2013: Budućnost

Senior career*
Years	Team	Apps	(Gls)
2013–2015	Budućnost	14	(1)
2015	Rudar Pljevlja	4	(0)
2016	Lovćen	7	(0)
2017–2018	Kom	26	(4)
2018	Iskra	18	(9)
2019–2021	Waasland-Beveren	35	(10)
2020–2021	→ Riga (loan)	23	(18)
2021–2022	Ironi Kiryat Shmona	14	(2)
2022–2023	Budućnost	31	(7)
2023	UTA Arad	16	(4)
2024	Algeciras	9	(0)
2024–2025	Europa	15	(4)
2026–	TransINVEST	28	(9)

International career^{‡}
2012	Montenegro U17	1	(0)
2013–2015	Montenegro U19	9	(3)
2018	Montenegro U21	2	(1)
2021	Montenegro	2	(0)
- * Club domestic league appearances and goals as of 15 September 2026 ‡ National team caps and goals as of 5 June 2021

Stefan Milošević (Montenegrin Cyrillic: Стефан Милошевић; born 23 June 1996) is a Montenegrin professional footballer who plays as a striker.

== Club career ==
=== Iskra ===
Milošević had his breakout season with Iskra in the summer of 2018 under coach Aleksandar Nedović. On August 25, 2018, he scored a brace in a 1–2 away win against Sutjeska. It was Sutjeska's first loss of the season. Over the course of half a season, Milošević scored nine goals in 18 games for Iskra, and was the highest scorer in the Montenegrin First League during the 2018–19 winter break.

=== Waasland-Beveren ===
On 15 January 2019, Milošević signed a 3.5-year contract with Waasland-Beveren. On 17 March 2019, he scored a hat-trick against Standard Liège.

=== Ironi Kiryat Shmona ===
On 4 August 2021, Milošević signed for the Israeli Premier League club Ironi Kiryat Shmona.

=== UTA Arad ===
On 3 January 2023, Milošević signed for Liga I club UTA Arad.

=== Algeciras CF ===
On 2 September 2023, Milošević joined Primera Federación club Algeciras on a free transfer. However, his transfer wasn't made official until December of the same year, due to bureaucratic issues that had prevented the team to send immigration paperwork about the striker's spell in Israel to the DGRIE office of the Spanish Ministry of the Interior. He made his debut for the Spanish side on 17 December, coming on as a second-half substitute and serving an assist in a 2–1 league loss to Málaga.

=== FK TransINVEST ===
On 12 Februaray 2026 announced, Milošević joined Transinvest. On 23 February 2026 Milošević made his debut in TOPLYGA against FA Šiauliai.

== International career ==
Milošević made his debut for the Montenegro national team in a friendly 0–0 tie with Bosnia and Herzegovina on 2 June 2021.

== Career statistics ==
=== International ===
As of 5 June 2021

National team	Year	Apps	Goals
Montenegro
Montenegro	2021	2	0
Total		2	0

== Honours ==
Riga FC

- Virslīga: 2020

Budućnost

- Montenegrin Cup: 2021–22

Individual

- Virslīga top scorer: 2021 (13 goals)
