= Mirsad Omerhodžić =

Croatian football manager and player

Personal information
- Full name: Mirsad Omerhodžić
- Date of birth: 22 May 1967 (age 59)
- Place of birth: Pula, SR Croatia, SFR Yugoslavia
- Height: 1.85 m (6 ft 1 in)
- Position: Forward

Senior career*
Years	Team	Apps	(Gls)
1988–1989	Novi Pazar	13	(2)
1989–1990	Sloboda Užice	31	(19)
1990–1992	Rodez	51	(10)
1992–1993	Chaves	15	(3)
1993–1994	Torreense	23	(5)
1994–1996	Rio Ave	59	(38)
1996–1997	Beira-Mar	26	(6)
1997–1998	Mladost Suhopolje	6	(1)

Managerial career
- 2002: Istra
- 2008: Rovinj
- 2008-2009: Bosnia and Herzegovina (asst.)
- 2010-2011: Shanghai Shenhua (Assistant)
- 2012-2013: Rovinj
- 2014: Interclube
- 2017: Iskra Danilovgrad
- * Club domestic league appearances and goals

Mirsad Omerhodžić (born 22 May 1967) is a Croatian football manager and former player.

== Playing career ==
As a player, he started his career at Novi Pazar but it was while playing for another Second Yugoslav League club, Sloboda Užice, that he became noted for having scored 19 league goals in one season. He moved abroad, first to France to play with lower league Rodez, and then to Portugal. His first season he played with Portuguese Liga club Chaves, but after a disappointing season he moved to Torreense playing in Liga de Honra, second tier. He played his most successful seasons in Portugal between 1994 and 1996, scoring 38 goals (19 each season) and earning his club, Rio Ave, a promotion to the top league. Omer, as Mirsad was known while in Portugal, next moved to Beira-Mar. During the season and a half he spent in Aveiro, he never overcame the disappointment of not returning to the top league, and after some poor displays he moved to Croatia to play with First League club NK Mladost 127. Soon after, he retired from competition and begin his coaching career.

== Managerial career ==
Omerhodžić coached NK Rovinj on three occasions and was named manager of Montenegrin outfit Iskra Danilovgrad in December 2016. He had been coach at Istra Pula earlier as well as being an assistant to Miroslav Blažević at the Bosnia and Herzegovina national team.
