= Ivan Novović =

Montenegrin footballer

Personal information
- Date of birth: 26 April 1989 (age 37)
- Height: 1.80 m (5 ft 11 in)
- Position: Defender

Youth career
- 2000–2007: FK Zeta

Senior career*
| Years | Team | Apps | (Gls) |
| 2007–2010 | Zeta | 60 | (3) |
| 2010–2011 | FC Krasnodar | 1 | (0) |
| 2011–2013 | Zeta | 74 | (3) |
| 2013–2021 | OFK Titograd | 219 | (12) |
| 2021–2022 | FK Dečić | 10 | (1) |
| 2022–2024 | Budućnost | 25 | (2) |
| Total | | 389 | (21) |
- * Club domestic league appearances and goals

Ivan Novović (born 26 April 1989) is a Montenegrin former professional footballer who played as a defender.

== Career statistics ==
=== Club ===
Appearances and goals by club, season and competition
| Club | Season | League | | | National cup | | Europe | | Total | |
| Club | Season | Division | Apps | Goals | Apps | Goals | Apps | Goals | Apps | Goals |
