= Miodrag Vukotić =

Montenegrin footballer

Personal information
- Date of birth: 8 November 1973 (age 52)
- Place of birth: Titograd, SR Montenegro, SFR Yugoslavia
- Height: 1.85 m (6 ft 1 in)
- Position: Centre-back

Senior career*
Years	Team	Apps	(Gls)
1990–1994	Budućnost Podgorica	78	(4)
1994–1996	Vojvodina	56	(3)
1996–1997	Budućnost Podgorica	8	(0)
1997	AC Milan	0	(0)
1997	→ Empoli (loan)	1	(0)
1997–1998	Young Boys	0	(0)
1998–1999	Budućnost Podgorica	2	(0)
1999–2000	Mogren		(0)
2000–2002	Waldhof Mannheim	38	(5)
2003	Zeta	13	(2)
2003–2004	SV Ried	3	(0)
2004	Kapfenberg		
2004–2005	Zeta	5	(0)
2005–2006	SV Ried	2	(0)
2006–2007	Mladost Podgorica	9	(0)
Total		215	(14)

Managerial career
- 2010–2013: Mladost Podgorica
- 2015-2017: Budućnost Podgorica
- 2017–2018: Rudar Pljevlja
- 2018–: Montenegro U21
- * Club domestic league appearances and goals

Miodrag Vukotić (Serbian Cyrillic: Миодраг Вукотић, born 8 November 1973) is a Montenegrin former professional footballer who played as a centre-back.

== Playing career ==
Born in Titograd, SR Montenegro, back in SFR Yugoslavia (nowadays Podgorica, Montenegro), during his adventurous career, he played for Budućnost Podgorica and Vojvodina, before moving to Italy, where he started with a six-month spell with AC Milan, then later to Empoli on loan. He continued his career at Swiss club Young Boys, Montenegrin clubs Mogren and Zeta, German club Waldhof Mannheim and finally, Austrian club SV Ried. He returned to Montenegro to play for Mladost Podgorica.

== Managerial career ==
Vukotić started his managerial career at Mladost Podgorica, where he was sacked in April 2013. He replaced Dragan Radojičić as manager of Budućnost in June 2015.

In September 2017 he signed a two-year contract with Rudar Pljevlja, but was dismissed as manager in June 2018.
