= Darko Nikač =

Montenegrin footballer (born 1990)

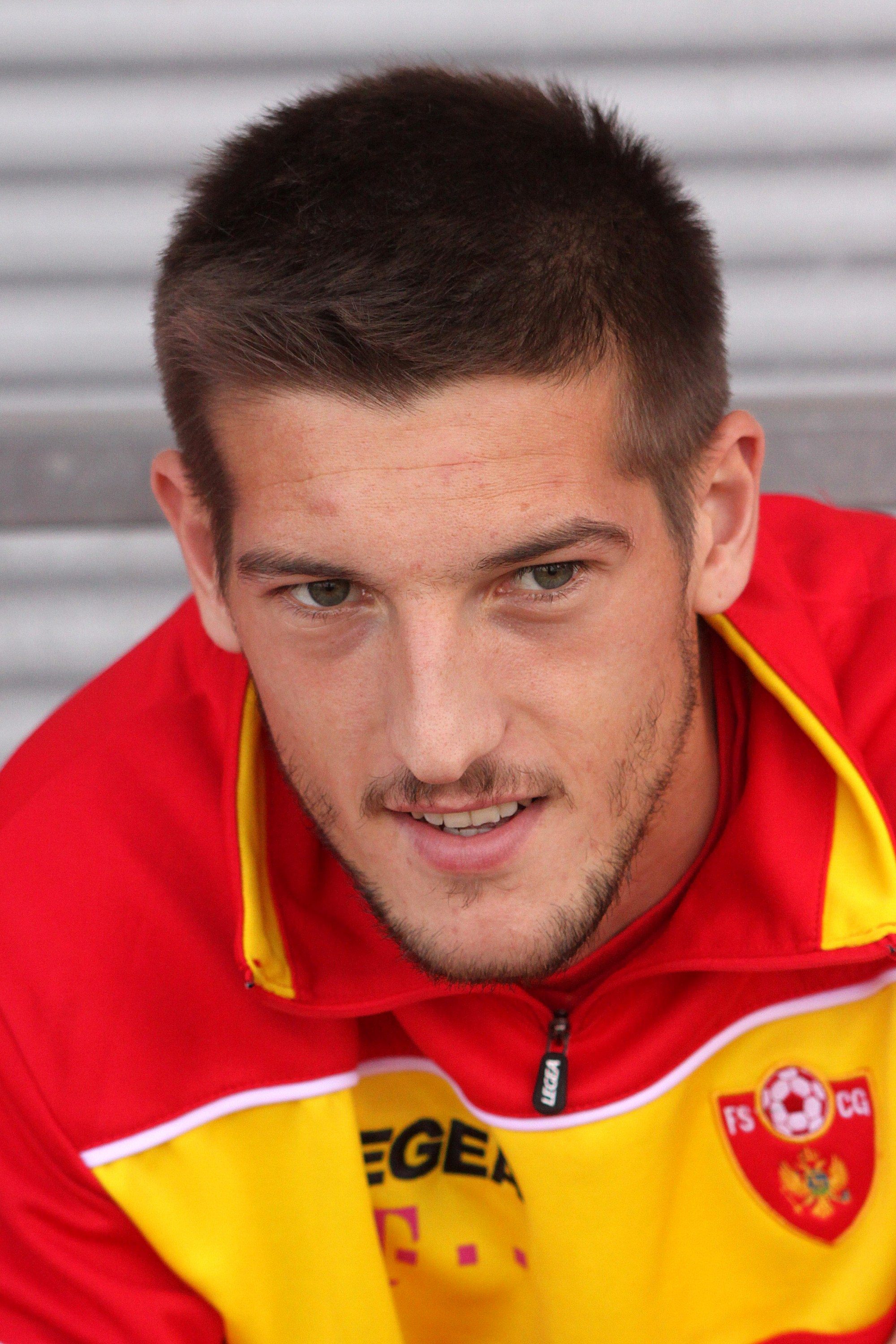
- Nikač with Montenegro in a friendly versus Iran in 2014

Personal information
- Full name: Darko Nikač
- Date of birth: 15 September 1990 (age 36)
- Place of birth: Titograd, SFR Yugoslavia
- Height: 1.85 m (6 ft 1 in)
- Position: Forward

Senior career*
Years	Team	Apps	(Gls)
2009–2014	Budućnost	101	(15)
2009–2010	→ Mladost Podgorica (loan)	0	(0)
2014–2015	Grbalj	11	(6)
2015	Pune	16	(5)
2015–2016	Budućnost	16	(10)
2016–2017	MTK Budapest	18	(2)
2017–2018	Budućnost	46	(12)
2018	Navbahor Namangan	11	(2)
2019	Iskra Danilovgrad	17	(12)
2019–2020	Teuta Durrës	17	(1)
2020–2021	Gjilani	33	(9)
2021–2022	FK Sutjeska Nikšić	27	(7)
2022–2023	FK Iskra	33	(1)
2023–2024	FK Arsenal Tivat	24	(3)

International career
2013	Montenegro U21	4	(1)
2013–2014	Montenegro	3	(0)
- * Club domestic league appearances and goals as of 17 October 2023

Darko Nikač (Serbian Cyrillic: Дарко Никач; born 15 September 1990) is a Montenegrin footballer who lastly played as a forward for Montenegrin side FK Arsenal Tivat. He debuted for Montenegro's national team in 2013.

== Club career ==
=== Budućnost ===
Nikač made his professional debut with Budućnost in the 2009–10 season. In the summer of 2013, he was in negotiations for a transfer to FC Wil 1900. In February 2014, Strømsgodset IF negotiated with Budućnost over Nikač, but Nikač remained at Budućnost.

=== Pune ===
Nikač signed for Indian I-League side Pune for the 2014–15 I-League. He scored his first goal for the club, in a 9th-minute strike against Bengaluru FC. He then scored against Shillong Lajong in a 5–2 Win. By the end of the season, Nikač scored five goals in 16 games for Pune.

=== Return to Budućnost ===
On June 26, 2015, it was announced that Nikač returned to Budućnost after one season in India. According to Montenegrin newspaper Vijesti, Nikač's new contract with Budućnost might be as short as six months, but the details were not disclosed as of June 2015.

== International career ==
He received his first full international cap on 17 November 2013, coming on in the 78th minute in a friendly against Luxembourg.

== Career statistics ==
=== Club ===
As of 30 May 2015

Club	Season	League			Cup		League Cup		Continental		Other		Total	
Club	Season	Division	Apps	Goals	Apps	Goals	Apps	Goals	Apps	Goals	Apps	Goals	Apps	Goals
Budućnost Podgorica	2009–10	Montenegrin First League	10	1			—		—		—		10	1
Budućnost Podgorica	2010–11	Montenegrin First League	21	1	2	0	—		1 (Note: Appearances in UEFA Europa League)	0	—		24	1
Budućnost Podgorica	2011–12	Montenegrin First League	17	4	0	0	—		1	0	—		18	4
Budućnost Podgorica	2012–13	Montenegrin First League	26	5	5	2	—		1 (Note: Appearances in UEFA Champions League)	0	—		32	7
Budućnost Podgorica	2013–14	Montenegrin First League	27	4	0	0	—		—		—		27	4
Budućnost Podgorica	Total		101	15	7	2	—		3	0	—		111	17
Grbalj	2014–15	Montenegrin First League	11	6	2	0	—		—		—		13	6
Pune	2014–15	I-League	16	5	0	0	—		—		—		16	5
Career total			128	26	9	2	0	0	3	0	0	0	140	28

== External sources ==
- Darko Nikač at National-Football-Teams.com
