= FK Iskra Danilovgrad =

Iskra Danilovgrad
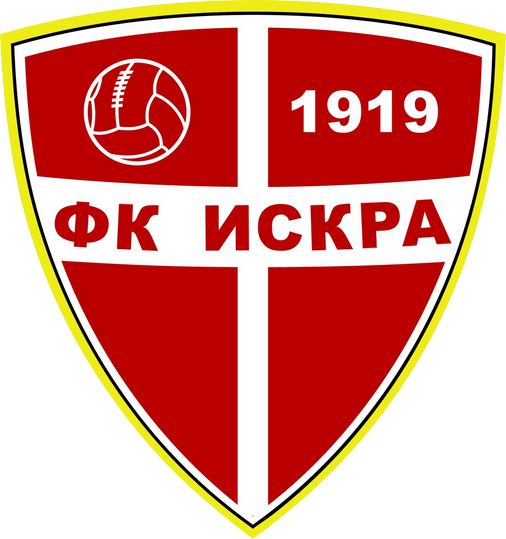
- Full name: Fudbalski klub Iskra Danilovgrad
- Nickname: Građani (Citizens)
- Short name: ISK
- Founded: 1919
- Ground: Braća Velašević Stadium
- Capacity: 2,500
- Chairman: Blažo Šaranović
- Manager: Aleksandar Nedović
- League: Montenegrin Second League
- 2024–25: Montenegrin Second League, 5th of 9
Home colours	Away colours

Fudbalski klub Iskra (English: Football Club Iskra) is a Montenegrin professional football club based in Danilovgrad. They currently compete in the Montenegrin Second League.

== History ==
FK Iskra was founded in 1919, under the name RSK Sloga Danilovgrad. Since 1929, the team played under the name RSK Zmaj, with their first-ever performance in the Montenegrin Football Championship in season 1933–34.
After World War II, the team started to play under the name FK Iskra. The first significant success came when Iskra earned promotion to the Montenegrin Republic League 1948–49. More historical success came when FK Iskra earned promotion to the Yugoslav Second League after playoff games against FK Bokelj, but finished last the following season. Next year, the team was dissolved due to financial troubles, but was refounded in 1959.
During the 1969–70 season, Iskra won the title in the Montenegrin Republic League and gained promotion to Yugoslav Second League. This time, they spent two seasons in the Second League, among some of well-known national sides such as FK Budućnost, FK Sutjeska or NK GOŠK. On 28 November 1971, FK Iskra made a historical win against neighbouring Podgorica's and Montenegrin strongest side FK Budućnost (1–0).
Until the mid-1990s, FK Iskra played only in the third and fourth division, without significant successes. The 1993–94, season FK Iskra made huge successes, with the 'double' on Republic level. The team from Danilovgrad became a champion of the Montenegrin Republic League and, for the first time in history, title of Montenegrin Republic Cup winner. That gained them promotion to the 1994-95 Yugoslav Second League and the very first performance in the Yugoslav Cup. After poor performance, FK Iskra finished 19th in the Second League, so were relegated to the third-tier competition. In the 1994–95 FR Yugoslavia Cup, FK Iskra made surprise in the first leg, with a victory against First league member FK Sloboda (2:0). But, in the Round of 16, FK Iskra were eliminated by Yugoslav title-holder FK Partizan (0–3; 0–10). During the next period, FK Iskra played between Yugoslav Second League and Montenegrin League. In the second tier, the team from Danilovgrad participated in season 1996–97, and from 2000 to 2003.
Following Montenegrin independence (2006), FK Iskra played in Second and Third League, but first notable successes came after 2013. On season 2013–14, FK Iskra won the champion title in the Third League. Next year, after the hard struggle with FK Dečić, FK Iskra became the champion of the Second League. With that result, FK Iskra gained their historical, first-ever promotion to the Montenegrin First League.
On their debut in the First League (season 2015-16), FK Iskra finished at 10th position, but remained a member of top-tier after the playoffs against FK Bratstvo (6–0; 2-2).
Next three seasons, FK Iskra finished in the middle of the table and notable success came on season 2019-20. Team from Danilovgrad finished third and gained their first-ever performances in European competitions. During the season, FK Iskra made numerous impressive results, including the big victory against title-holder FK Budućnost (4–1). After that success, the team qualified for 2020–21 UEFA Europa League.

=== First League Record ===
For the first time, FK Iskra participated in the Montenegrin First League on the 2015–16 season. Below is a list of FK Iskra placements in the Montenegrin First League by every season.

Season	Pos	G	W	D	L	GF	GA
2015–16	10	33	7	13	13	29	51
2016–17	6	33	14	7	12	29	32
2017–18	7	36	12	9	15	33	34
2018–19	5	36	13	11	12	46	39
2019–20	3	31	15	8	8	43	33
2020–21	8	36	9	17	10	28	29
2021–22	4	36	15	6	15	48	45
2022–23	10	36	7	10	19	33	58

== Honours ==
- Montenegrin Second League
  - Winners: 2014–15
- Montenegrin Third League
  - Winners: 2006–07, 2009–10, 2013–14
- Montenegrin Republic League
  - Winners: 1969–70, 1972–73, 1993–94, 1999–2000
  - Runner-up: 1955–56, 1959–60, 1978–79
- Montenegrin Republic Cup
  - Winners: 1993–94

== European record ==
Season	Competition	Round	Club	Home	Away	Agg.
2020-21	2020–21 UEFA Europa League	PR	(Andorra) FC Santa Coloma	0–0 (a.e.t.) (4-3 p)		
2020-21	2020–21 UEFA Europa League	1QR	(Bulgaria) Lokomotiv Plovdiv	0–1		
2022-23	2022–23 UEFA Europa Conference League	1QR	(Albania) Laçi	0-1	0–0	0–1

Notes

- PR: Preliminary round
- Q1: First qualifying round

== Players ==
=== Current squad ===
As of 15 February 2026

Note: Flags indicate national team as defined under FIFA eligibility rules; some limited exceptions apply. Players may hold more than one non-FIFA nationality.

No.	Pos.	Nation	Player
2	DF	MNE	Damjan Radulović
4	FW	MNE	Danijel Nikolić (on loan from Sutjeska)
6	MF	MNE	Danilo Marković
7	FW	MNE	Pavle Pavićević
8	MF	MNE	Bogdan Obradović
9	FW	MNE	Andrija Kolundzić
10	FW	MNE	Marko Šćepanović (on loan from Budućnost)
12	GK	MNE	Matija Đurović
13	MF	MNE	Vuk Popović
15	DF	MNE	Nikola Vukotić
16	MF	MNE	Danilo Ćetković
17	DF	MNE	Anđelko Bokan

No.	Pos.	Nation	Player
20	MF	MNE	Matija Jovanović (on loan from Budućnost)
22	FW	JPN	Takato Sakai
23	DF	SRB	Dragan Trninić (on loan from Budućnost)
27	DF	MNE	Aleksa Makočević
28	MF	JPN	Riu Kaneda
30	MF	MNE	Danijel Jovanović
45	MF	MNE	Luka Brajković (on loan from Budućnost)
50	GK	MNE	Tomaš Đurović
88	FW	MNE	Sava Milić
98	DF	MNE	Vasilije Vučinić
99	MF	MNE	Petar Tadić

=== Notable players ===
Below is the list of former Iskra players who represented their countries at the full international level.

- (Serbia and Montenegro) (Montenegro) Igor Burzanović
- (Montenegro) Srđan Blažić
- (Montenegro) Driton Camaj
- (Montenegro) Uroš Đuranović
- (Montenegro) Igor Ivanović
- (Montenegro) Miroje Jovanović
- (Montenegro) Stefan Milošević
- (Montenegro) Darko Nikač
- (Montenegro) Luka Pejović
- (Montenegro) Balša Sekulić
- (Montenegro) Ivan Vuković

For the list of former and current players with Wikipedia article, please see Category:FK Iskra Danilovgrad players.

== Historical list of coaches ==
- (Montenegro) Željko Tomašević (Jul 2008 - Jun 2013)
- (Montenegro) Dejan Mrvaljević (2014 - Jul 2015)
- (Montenegro) Goran Jovanović (Jul 2015 - Dec 2015)
- (Montenegro) Ratko Stevović (1 Jan 2016 - May 2016)
- (Montenegro) Milija Savović (Jun 2016)
- (Montenegro) Radislav Dragićević (1 Jul 2016 - Dec 2016)
- (Croatia) Mirsad Omerhodžić (28 Dec 2016 - May 2017)
- (Serbia) Jovan Stanković (25 Jun 2017 - Dec 2017)
- (Montenegro) Aleksandar Nedović (7 Dec 2017 - 5 May 2021)
- (Montenegro) Srđan Nikić (15 May 2021 - 10 Mar 2022)
- (Serbia) Marko Vidojević (13 Jul 2023 - 18 Sep 2023)

== Stadium ==
FK Iskra plays its home games at Braća Velašević Stadium. The pitch is built on the Zeta riverbank, at the centre of town. After the last reconstruction, the stadium holds a capacity of 2,500 spectators, and in 2019 floodlights were installed.

== See also ==
- Braća Velašević Stadium
- Montenegrin First League
- Football in Montenegro
- Montenegrin clubs in Yugoslav football competitions (1946–2006)
- Danilovgrad
