= FK Lovćen =

Montenegrin football club from Cetinje

- Full name: Fudbalski klub Lovćen
- Nicknames: Orlovi (Eagles), Crveni (Reds)
- Founded: 1913; 113 years ago
- Ground: Sveti Petar Cetinjski
- Capacity: 5,192
- Chairman: Miroslav Ivanišević
- Manager: Predrag Vukotić
- League: Montenegrin Second League
- 2025–26: Montenegrin Second League, 6th of 10
- Website: www.fklovcen.me
Home colours	Away colours

Fudbalski klub Lovćen is a football club based in Cetinje, Montenegro. It was founded on 20 June 1913. It was named after Mount Lovćen near Cetinje. Lovćen is the oldest football club in Montenegro and one of the oldest in Southeastern Europe. Today, Lovćen is a member of Montenegrin Second League. FK Lovćen is a part of Lovćen Cetinje sports society.

== History ==
=== Period 1913–1941 ===
The club was founded on 20 June 1913, as a Workers' sports club Lovćen (RŠK Lovćen). Among the founders were Montenegrin painters Luka and Milo Milunović, and Luka Milunović was the first president and a captain of the team.
As the oldest Montenegrin football club, Lovćen participated in its first national competitions in the 1910s and 1920s. First trophy of Lovćen was 'Sports olympiad' on Cetinje 1914, a tournament which included football clubs from Montenegro, Albania and Austria-Hungary. Until World War II, Lovćen won five Montenegrin championships (Spring 1925, Autumn 1925, Spring 1927, Autumn 1928, 1935). They also won two Zeta Olympiad annual tournaments (1926, 1927) and seven City Championships of Cetinje. During that era, Lovćen had strong rivals in another club from Cetinje, SK Crnogorac, and in two clubs from Podgorica, FK Budućnost and GSK Balšić. These four teams were the best football clubs in Montenegro before World War II.
For supporting the prohibited Labours' Party, FK Lovćen was prohibited during the 1937, same as FK Budućnost. The club was renewed in 1944 and in 1945. Lovćen played its first matches after the restructuring. That year, in Cetinje, Lovćen and Budućnost played the first Montenegrin clubs' match after World War II. Budućnost won – 4:2.

Competition	Titles	Runner-up	Champion seasons
Montenegrin championship	5	5	Spring 1925, Autumn 1925, Spring 1927, Autumn 1928, 1935
'Zeta olympiad'	2	1	1926, 1927
'Sports olympiad'	1	-	1914

Montenegrin championship - Elimination tournament for Montenegrin football clubs; 'Zeta olympiad' - Cup tournament for Montenegrin football clubs; 'Sports olympiad' - tournament held on Cetinje, with participation of clubs from Montenegro, Albania and Austria-Hungary.

=== Period 1945–1997 ===
With FK Budućnost (Podgorica), FK Sutjeska (Nikšić) and FK Arsenal (Tivat), Lovćen was a member of the first official football competition after World War II - 1946 Montenegrin Republic League. FK Lovćen finished as a second team and gained an opportunity to participate in the qualifiers for the inaugural season of Yugoslav First League, but didn't succeed. In the first leg, Lovćen won against Makedonija Skopje (3:0), and in the second they eliminated Borac Banja Luka (5:1, 5:1). In the last qualifier for the First League, Lovćen lost against Metalac Beograd (0:2, 2:6).
Another chance to get promotion to the First League, Lovćen got as a champion of Yugoslav Second League – group 'B' in 1956. In the first leg, Lovćen eliminated Zenica (2:1, 0:0) and participated in the play-off group. During the group matches, the club from Cetinje played against Vardar Skopje (1:2, 0:2), Lokomotiva Zagreb (4:1, 1:6) and Borovo (2:1, 1:⁴). After the six group matches Lovćen failed to get promotion, with one point below the First League zone.
In their third and last play-off for the First League in the SFR Yugoslavia, in 1957, Lovćen was eliminated in the first qualifying leg against Željezničar Sarajevo (0:0, 0:2).
One more big success of Lovćen was in 1947, by winning the U21 Championship title of Yugoslavia.
Until the collapse of Yugoslavia, Lovćen usually participated in Yugoslav Second League. Montenegro's oldest club played 552 games in that competition. The best performance in a united Yugoslav Second division was achieved in the 1954/55 season, when together with seven wins, two draws and nine defeats, they secured sixth place in the standings. The most successful season, however, was in 1968/69 – Lovćen won fourth place with a score of 12–11–7. After Budućnost and Sutjeska, Lovćen was the most successful Montenegrin club at that time.

=== Period 1992–2006 ===
In the Federal Republic of Yugoslavia (1992–2003), and the State Union of Serbia and Montenegro (2003–2006), Lovćen played in the second and third league. The best results, Lovćen made during the 1998/99 season, when they finished the Second league 8th of 18 table places. For a few seasons, the club was the winner of the Montenegrin Republic Cup.
During the last days of the Serbia and Montenegro Federation, Lovćen was relegated in the Third League (Montenegrin Republic League) and in its last seasons (2004/05, 2005/06) they made the weakest appearances during the newest history.

=== Period 2006– ===
After the independence of Montenegro, Lovćen participated in the first season of the Montenegrin Second League. Lovćen finished first in the 2006/2007 season of the Second League, and was directly promoted to the Montenegrin First League.
At the first match in the First League, Lovćen played on 11 August 2007. against OFK Petrovac in Cetinje – 2:2, with attendance of 2,000 supporters. In 2009, for the first time since the independence, Lovćen appeared in the final Cup of Montenegro, when they lost the game against OFK Petrovac. Before that match, in the semifinals, Lovćen eliminated FK Budućnost.
Lovćen made its greatest success in the First League during the 2013/14 season. After the first half-season, the club from Cetinje finished third. During the spring season, the club made a historic row of 11 matches without a loss (7 consecutive wins). Lovćen finished the season in second place, which was the best ever result in the club's history.
In the same season, on 21 May 2014, for the first time, Lovćen won the Montenegrin Cup. During the 2013/2014 Montenegrin Cup, Lovćen eliminated Zora (1:0), Crvena stijena (8:0, 1:2), Zeta (1:0, 1:2) and Petrovac (3:0, 0:0). In the finals, Lovćen won the game against Titograd, so the club from Cetinje won their first national trophy.
With that success, for the first time in the club's history, Lovćen qualified for the European Cups.
After 10 consecutive seasons in top-tier competitions, in the 2016/17 season, FK Lovćen finished in 11th position, so they were relegated to Montenegrin Second League. They spent a single season in second-tier, with comeback to First League after the playoffs against Kom (2–1; 0-0). Next year, FK Lovćen made an impressive result in Montenegrin Cup, crowned with third performance in the finals. But, in the game for trophy, team from Cetinje was defeated against Budućnost (0–4). At the same time, FK Lovćen was relegated from the First League, again after the playoffs against Kom (0–1; 0–1).
The worst days in the history of club started on 2019/20 season. FK Lovćen finished as ninth on the table, which meant relegation to Montenegrin Third League. That was the first-ever performance of FK Lovćen in the bottom-tier competition. In October 2020, they reached another depth when they were beaten 10–1 by Obilić.

== Lovćen in European competitions ==
For the first time, Lovćen gained a participation in the European competitions after the season 2013/14. As a Montenegrin Cup winner and the runner-up in the Montenegrin First League, Lovćen debuted in Europa League 2014/15.

During their first appearance in European competition, Lovćen was eliminated by Željezničar Sarajevo. After the draw in the first match in Sarajevo (0:0), Lovćen lost 0:1 at the game, which was played at Petrovac Stadium.

=== Matches ===
Season	Competition	Round	Club	Home	Away	Agg.
2014-15	2014–15 UEFA Europa League	1QR	(Bosnia and Herzegovina) Željezničar	0–1	0–0	0–1

Notes

- 1Q: First qualifying round

== Honours and achievements ==
- National Order of the Montenegrin flag
  - 2013
- Montenegrin First League – 0
  - runner-up (1): 2013–14
- Montenegrin Cup – 1
  - winners (1): 2014
  - finalist (2): 2009, 2019
- Montenegrin Championship (1922–1940) – 5
  - winners (5): Spring 1925, Autumn 1925, Spring 1927, Autumn 1928, 1935
  - runner-up (5): 1922, Autumn 1932, Spring 1933, Autumn 1933, 1934
- Sports Olympiad (First Football Tournament in Montenegro) – 1
  - winners (1): 1914
- Montenegrin Second League – 1
  - winners (1): 2006–07
  - Montenegrin Third League – 1
  - winners (1): 2022–23
- Yugoslav Second League – 2
  - winners (2): 1955–56, 1956–57
- Montenegrin Republic League – 9
  - winners (9): 1959–60, 1962–63, 1964–65, 1973–74, 1979–80, 1981–82, 1984–85, 1989–90, 1992–93
  - runner-up (7): 1946, 1947–48, 1948–49, 1953, 1963–64, 1997–98, 2003–04
- Montenegrin Republic Cup – 10
  - winners (10): 1950, 1951, 1952, 1954, 1969–70, 1972–73, 1974–75, 1984–85, 1987–88, 2001–02

== List of competitive matches (1946–) ==
Most of their seasons, Lovćen spent in the second and third football level in SFR Yugoslavia and, after that, in FR Yugoslavia. In the 1940s and 1950s, Lovćen participated in the Yugoslav First League playoffs, but without promotion to the top-tier. After Montenegrin independence, the club made their first appearances in the First League (since the season 2007–08). Except for that, the club for Cetinje often played play-off matches for placement to the First or Second Yugoslav League. Lovćen played one season in the UEFA Europa League.

Competition Level	Seasons	First season	Last season	Matches	W	D	L	GD
First League	10	2007-08	2018-19	366	122	91	153	362:428
Second League	30	1953-54	2019-20	899	332	204	363	1141:1233
Third League	3	1988-89	1991-92	101	39	18	44	129:160
Republic League	30	1946	2005-06	656	370	144	142	1341:645
Playoffs	11	1946	2018-19	43	17	8	18	61:71
National Cup	25	1950	2019-20	76	31	12	33	103:102
UEFA competitions	1	2014-15	2014-15	2	0	1	1	0:1
OVERALL (1946–)				2143	911	478	754	3137:2640

== Sponsors ==
- Official kit supplier : Legea (2013–2014), Givova (2014–)
- Main sponsor : Prijestonica Cetinje / Old Royal Capital Cetinje (municipal government)
- Other sponsors : Lovćen Osiguranje / Lovćen Insurance

== Players ==
=== Current squad ===
As of 10 February 2025 Note: Flags indicate national team as defined under FIFA eligibility rules; some limited exceptions apply. Players may hold more than one non-FIFA nationality.

No.	Pos.	Nation	Player
1	GK	MNE	Šaban Kolić
4	DF	MNE	Slobodan Perišić
5	DF	MNE	Risto Vujović
6	FW	MNE	Balša Radusinović
7	MF	MNE	Božidar Bujiša
8	MF	MNE	Luka Drmač
9	FW	MNE	Bojan Pavićević
10	MF	MNE	Vuko Vicković
11	FW	MNE	Balša Radović
12	GK	MNE	Petar Kustudija
13	DF	JPN	Haruki Yamamura
14	MF	MNE	Kenan Orahovac
15	MF	JPN	Hinata Sakamaki

No.	Pos.	Nation	Player
16	DF	MNE	Filip Vujović
17	MF	MNE	Dražen Mudreša
18	FW	MNE	Nikola Draganić
20	DF	MNE	Milija Golubović
21	GK	MNE	Dragan Ćetković (on loan from Arsenal Tivat)
22	MF	MNE	Nikola Tripković
23	MF	MNE	Jovan Vujović
24	MF	MNE	Filip Kalačević
25	DF	MNE	Matija Pejović
45	FW	MNE	Boško Guzina
99	MF	BIH	Amer Tabak
—	GK	MNE	Luka Đurović
—	MF	MNE	Matija Ćupić

=== Notable players ===
For the list of former and current players with Wikipedia article, please see Category:FK Lovćen players.

During the history, several notable players started their careers or played for FK Lovćen. Below is the list of international players and domestic players who, during their career, played for FK Lovćen and their national teams at full international level.

- (Socialist Federal Republic of Yugoslavia) Milutin Pajević
- (Socialist Federal Republic of Yugoslavia) Ljubomir Radanović
- (Socialist Federal Republic of Yugoslavia) Vasilije Radović
- (Serbia and Montenegro) Nenad Brnović
- (Montenegro) Vladan Adžić
- (Montenegro) Driton Camaj
- (Montenegro) Deni Hočko
- (Montenegro) Ivan Janjušević
- (Montenegro) Ilija Martinović
- (Montenegro) Stefan Milošević
- (Montenegro) Luka Mirković
- (Montenegro) Nikola Vujović
- (Montenegro) Luka Pejović
- (Montenegro) Danijel Petković
- (Montenegro) Ilija Vukotić
- (Venezuela) Hermes Palomino

== Coaches ==
=== Current staff ===
Position	Staff
Manager	(North Macedonia) Dragan Kanatlarovski
Assistant Manager	(Montenegro) Đuro Mijušković
Goalkeeping coach	
U21 Team coach	(Montenegro) Filip Radojičić
U17 Team coach	(Montenegro) Predrag Vukotić
U14 coach	(Montenegro) Ivan Vujović
U12 Coach	(Montenegro) Gojko Ražnatović

Last updated: 4 August 2016
Source: FK Lovćen official website

== Historical list of coaches ==
Since their promotion to the First League, Lovćen was led by 10 different coaches. During that period, the club had best results with club Mojaš Radonjić in the 2013/14 season. At that time, Lovćen won their first and only national title (Montenegrin Cup 2013/14) with first promotion to the European competitions.

- (Montenegro) Nikola Rakojević (Jul 2007 – Jun 2008)
- (Serbia) Slobodan Dogandžić (Jul 2008 – Sep 2008)
- (Montenegro) Miodrag Radanović (Oct 2008 – Dec 2008)
- (Montenegro) Milorad Malovrazić (Jan 2009 – Jun 2009)
- (Montenegro) Branislav Milačić (Jul 2009 – Dec 2010)
- (Montenegro) Marko Marković (Jan 2011 – Sep 2011)
- (Montenegro) Predrag Vukotić (26 Sep 2011 – Dec 2011)
- (Montenegro) Radovan Kavaja (Jan 2012 – Jun 2012)
- (Serbia) Slobodan Halilović (Jul 2012 – Dec 2012)
- (Montenegro) Mojaš Radonjić (Jan 2013 – Oct 2014)
- (Montenegro) Đuro Mijušković (Nov 2014 – Jan 2015)
- (Montenegro) Radovan Kavaja (Jan 2015 – Jun 2015)
- (Serbia) Slobodan Halilović (Jul 2015 – Sep 2015)
- (Montenegro) Dragan Đukanović (Oct 2015 – Mar 2016)
- (Montenegro) Milorad Malovrazić (4 Apr 2016 – Sep 2016)
- (North Macedonia) Dragan Kanatlarovski (19 Sep 2016 – Mar 2018)
- (Montenegro) Slobodan Drašković (Apr 2018 – May 2018)
- (Montenegro) Dejan Roganović (3 May 2018 – Sep 2018)
- (Montenegro) Aleksandar Miljenović (24 Sep 2018 – Jun 2019)
- (Montenegro) Predrag Vukotić (Jul 2019 – Jun 2020)

== Stadium ==
FK Lovćen plays their home games at Stadion Sveti Petar Cetinjski, whose capacity is 5,192 seats. Sveti Petar Cetinjski is home of FK Lovćen since 1957. Before that, the team played their home games at the old stadium near today's location (1913–1943) and on the stadium near the Cetinje Monastery (1943–1957).
First game on Sveti Petar Cetinjski was Yugoslav Second League match FK Lovćen - NK GOŠK, played in August 1957. Highest attendance in the history of stadium was recorded on Yugoslav Cup game between FK Lovćen and NK Dinamo Zagreb (1971). Game was attended by 6,500 spectators.

== Women's football ==
While FK Lovćen is the oldest men's club in Montenegro, Women's Football Club Lovćen (ŽFK Lovćen) was founded in May 2010. Since then, the club played and organized numerous tournaments, and on the 2015–16 season for the first time played in Montenegrin Women's League and Montenegrin Cup (women).

== See also ==
- List of FK Lovćen seasons
- FK Lovćen in European competitions
- ŽFK Lovćen
- SD Lovćen Cetinje
- Cetinje
- Montenegrin First League
- Montenegrin Football Championship (1922–1940)
- Montenegrin clubs in Yugoslav football competitions (1946–2006)
