= OFK Grbalj =

- Full name: Omladinski fudbalski klub Grbalj
- Nickname: Trikolori (The Tricolors)
- Founded: 1995; 31 years ago
- Ground: Stadion Donja Sutvara, Radanovići, Kotor
- Capacity: 1,500
- Chairman: Nenad Maslovar
- Manager: Viktor Trenevski
- League: Montenegrin Second League
- 2024–25: Montenegrin Second League, 6th of 9
- Website: ofkgrbalj.com
Home colours	Away colours

Omladinski fudbalski klub Grbalj (Serbian Cyrillic: Омладински фудбалски клуб Грбаљ, Serbo-Croatian pronunciation: [gr̩̂baʎ]) is a Montenegrin professional football club based in the small town of Radanovići, municipality of Kotor. They currently compete in the Montenegrin Second League.

== History ==
The first football club in Radanovići, which existed only few seasons, was founded in 1970. After many years, the club was refounded in June 1995 and in their first season the team gained promotion to the Montenegrin Republic League for the 1996–97 season (third tier of the FR Yugoslavia football system). After only three seasons in the Republic League, in the summer of 1999, OFK Grbalj (OFC Humpback) became a member of the FR Yugoslavia Second League, which was the biggest success of the team until 2006. OFK Grbalj spent four seasons in the Second Yugoslav League.
After Montenegrin independence, OFK Grbalj became a member of the Montenegrin First League. In the 2006–07 season, the team achieved third place, just behind two of the most successful teams in national competitions, Zeta and Budućnost Podgorica. Over the next two seasons, OFK Grbalj finished as a fourth-placed team. During subsequent seasons, the team didn't achieve the same successes as in their first seasons in top-tier competition, but they were never relegated from the First League.
OFK Grbalj holds two all-time records in the Montenegrin First League. On 29 May 2010 they defeated Kom 11–0, which is the biggest margin of victory in the history of league. Five years later, on 23 May 2015, OFK Grbalj beat Mornar in Bar 7–0, which is the biggest away victory in league.
In the 2016–17 season, OFK Grbalj had the greatest success in their history by reaching the Montenegrin Cup final. They lost game against Sutjeska 1–0.
After 14 consecutive seasons in top-tier, OFK Grbalj finished as a last-placed team in 2019-20 Montenegrin First League. After the campaign full of disappointing results, team from Radanovići was relegated to Montenegrin Second League.

=== First League Record ===
For the first time, OFK Grbalj played in Montenegrin First League on season 2006–07. Below is a list of OFK Grbalj scores in First League by every single season.

Season	Pos	G	W	D	L	GF	GA
2006–07	3	33	14	7	12	37	30
2007–08	4	33	14	13	6	40	25
2008–09	4	33	15	5	13	47	34
2009–10	5	33	15	8	10	66	42
2010–11	7	33	10	8	15	30	35
2011–12	9	33	9	7	17	28	49
2012–13	4	33	13	12	8	41	21
2013–14	7	33	11	10	12	36	40
2014–15	5	33	15	7	11	52	44
2015–16	7	33	11	5	17	38	49
2016–17	7	33	11	13	9	28	25
2017–18	4	36	12	14	10	39	39
2018–19	6	36	11	15	10	45	36
2019–20	10	31	4	10	17	23	49

=== OFK Grbalj in European competitions ===
For the first time, OFK Grbalj played in European competitions on season 2007-08.
They were first team from Montenegrin coastal region which played in UEFA competitions. Until now, OFK Grbalj played two seasons in European cups.

Season	Competition	Round	Club	Home	Away	Agg.
2007-08	2007 UEFA Intertoto Cup	1R	(Romania) Gloria Bistrița	1–1	1–2	2–3
2008-09	2008 UEFA Intertoto Cup	1R	(Bosnia and Herzegovina) Čelik	2–1	2–3	4–4 (a)
2008-09	2008 UEFA Intertoto Cup	2R	(Turkey) Sivasspor	2–2	0–1	2–3

== Honours ==
- Montenegrin Cup
  - Runners-up (1): 2016–17
- Montenegrin Republic League
  - Champions (1): 2002–03

== Players ==
=== Current squad ===
As of 10 February 2025

Note: Flags indicate national team as defined under FIFA eligibility rules; some limited exceptions apply. Players may hold more than one non-FIFA nationality.

No.	Pos.	Nation	Player
1	GK	MNE	Vuko Vujović
2	DF	MNE	Nebojša Obradović
3	DF	MNE	Nemanja Petrović
4	DF	MNE	Đorđe Ercegović
5	DF	MNE	Matija Pejović
6	MF	MNE	Simo Popović
7	FW	MNE	Lazar Pajović
8	MF	MNE	Stefan Vukčević
9	FW	MNE	Siniša Stanisavić
11	DF	MNE	Aleksandar Krstovic
12	GK	MNE	Nikola Radović

No.	Pos.	Nation	Player
14	MF	MNE	Strahinja Đuričić
15	MF	JPN	Shunya Ueda
17	MF	MNE	Vuk Pavićević
18	MF	MNE	Đorđe Stešević
19	FW	JPN	Jimbo Steven Miura
20	FW	SLE	Santigie Sesay
21	FW	MNE	Stefan Čađenović
22	FW	MNE	Danilo Pejović
23	MF	MNE	Petar Sklender
24	DF	MNE	Vasilije Ercegović

=== Notable players ===
Below is the list of former Grbalj players who represented their countries at the full international level.

- (Montenegro) Saša Balić
- (Montenegro) Dragan Bošković
- (Montenegro) Lazar Carević
- (Montenegro) Radomir Đalović
- (Montenegro) Ivan Delić
- (Montenegro) Dragan Grivić
- (Montenegro) Branislav Janković
- (Montenegro) Darko Nikač
- (Montenegro) Nemanja Nikolić
- (Montenegro) Luka Pejović
- (Montenegro) Rade Petrović
- (Montenegro) Srđan Radonjić
- (Montenegro) Janko Simović
- (Montenegro) Nedeljko Vlahović
- (Montenegro) Marko Vukčević
- (Montenegro) Ilija Vukotić
- (Montenegro) Ivan Vuković

For the list of former and current players with Wikipedia article, please see Category:OFK Grbalj players.

== Historical list of coaches ==
- (Montenegro) Ivo Donković (2006 - Nov 2006)
- (Montenegro) Zoran Lemajić (5 Nov 2006 - Jan 2007)
- (Montenegro) Dragan Pican (15 Jan 2007 - Jun 2007)
- (Montenegro) Dragan Aničić (Jul 2007 - Oct 2007)
- (Montenegro) Nebojša Vignjević (22 Oct 2007 - May 2009)
- (Montenegro) Nenad Maslovar (6 May 2009 - Jun 2009)
- (Montenegro) Saša Petrović (Jul 2009 - Nov 2010)
- (Bosnia and Herzegovina) Zvezdan Milošević (9 Nov 2010 - Mar 2011)
- (Montenegro) Dragan Radojičić (12 Mar 2011 - Jun 2011)
- (Montenegro) Zoran Tripković (Jul 2011 - Jan 2012)
- (Montenegro) Aleksandar Nedović (22 Jan 2012 - Jun 2014)
- (Serbia) Marko Vidojević (Jul 2014 - Mar 15)
- (Montenegro) Ilija Radović (5 Mar 2015 - Jun 2015)
- (Montenegro) Bogdan Korak (Jul 2015 - Aug 2015)
- (Montenegro) Dušan Vlaisavljević (1 Sep 2015 - Dec 2015)
- (Montenegro) Dragoljub Đuretić (1 Jan 2016 - Jun 2017)
- (Montenegro) Dragan Radojičić (Jun 2017 - Dec 2017)
- (Serbia) Zoran Govedarica (Jan 2018 - Jun 18)
- (Montenegro) Veselin Stešević (Jun 2018 - Apr 2019)
- (Bosnia and Herzegovina) Zvezdan Milošević (May 2019 - Jun 2019)
- (Montenegro) Dušan Vlaisavljević (Jun 2019 - Oct 2019)
- (Serbia) Marko Vidojević (Oct 2019 - Jul 2020)
- (Montenegro) Derviš Hadžiosmanović (Nov 2020 - Jul 2021 )
- (North Macedonia) Viktor Trenevski (Jul 2021 - )

== Stadium ==
OFK Grbalj play at Stadion Donja Sutvara, near the main road between Budva and Kotor. Stadium capacity is 1,500 seats on one stand and it doesn't meet UEFA standards for European competitions. Except the main ground, there is a smaller artificial pitch at Donja Sutvara football complex.

== Sponsors ==
- Official sponsor: Carinvest
- Official kit supplier: Givova

== See also ==
- Stadion Donja Sutvara
- Kotor
- Budva
- Montenegrin First League
- Montenegrin clubs in Yugoslav football competitions (1946–2006)
