= Aleksandar Nedović =

Montenegrin footballer and manager

Personal information
- Full name: Aleksandar Nedović
- Date of birth: 5 September 1978 (age 48)
- Place of birth: Titograd, SFR Yugoslavia
- Height: 1.84 m (6 ft 0 in)
- Position: Attacking midfielder

Youth career
- Budućnost Podgorica

Senior career*
Years	Team	Apps	(Gls)
1995–2000	Budućnost Podgorica	104	(13)
1998	→ Rudar Pljevlja (loan)	12	(0)
2001–2004	Partizan	3	(0)
2002	→ Čukarički (loan)	13	(6)
2003	→ Napredak Kruševac (loan)	10	(3)
2004	Volyn Lutsk	4	(0)
2005	Radnički Beograd	7	(1)
2005	Inter Baku	6	(0)
2006–2007	Grbalj	31	(3)
2008	Rudar Pljevlja	22	(2)
2009	Lovćen	12	(0)
2009–2011	Bar	28	(5)
Total		252	(33)

International career
1996	FR Yugoslavia U18	2	(0)

Managerial career
- 2012–2014: Grbalj
- 2014–2015: Mladost Podgorica
- 2015–2016: Sutjeska Nikšić
- 2016–2017: Petrovac
- 2017–2021: Iskra Danilovgrad
- 2021—2022: Budućnost Podgorica
- * Club domestic league appearances and goals

Aleksandar Nedović (Cyrillic: Александар Недовић; born 5 September 1978) is a Montenegrin football manager and former player. He last manages FK Budućnost Podgorica.

== Playing career ==
=== Club ===
After starting out at Budućnost Podgorica in the First League of FR Yugoslavia, Nedović was transferred to Partizan in the 2001 winter transfer window. He made just three league appearances for the club over the course of three and a half years, but also spent some time on loan to Čukarički (2002) and Napredak Kruševac (2003).

In the 2008 winter transfer window, Nedović moved from Grbalj to fellow Montenegrin First League side Rudar Pljevlja. He later also played for Lovćen and Bar, before beginning his managerial career with Grbalj.

== Honours ==
Partizan

- First League of FR Yugoslavia: 2001–02
