= Braća Velašević Stadium =

Football stadium in Montenegro

Coordinates: 42°33′14.7″N 19°06′10.6″E

- Interactive map of Braća Velašević Stadium
- Full name: Stadion Braće Velašević
- Location: Danilovgrad, Montenegro
- Owner: City of Danilovgrad
- Capacity: 2,500
- Surface: grass
- Field size: 105 m × 65 m (344 ft × 213 ft)

Construction
- Built: 1947
- Renovated: 2016

Tenant
- FK Iskra

Braća Velašević Stadium is a football stadium in Danilovgrad, Montenegro. It is situated near the Zeta riverbank, it is used for football matches. The stadium is the home ground of FK Iskra.

== History ==
The stadium was built after World War II, near the Zeta river, in the centre of town. Over time, it has undergone several renovations, with the most recent reconstruction completed in 2016. Today, the capacity of the two stands is 2,500 seats and the floodlights were installed in 2019.

== Pitch and conditions ==
The pitch measures 105×65 meters. The stadium did not meet UEFA criteria for European competitions.

== See also ==
- FK Iskra
- Danilovgrad
