= Danilovgrad =

Danilovgrad Даниловград
- Town and municipality
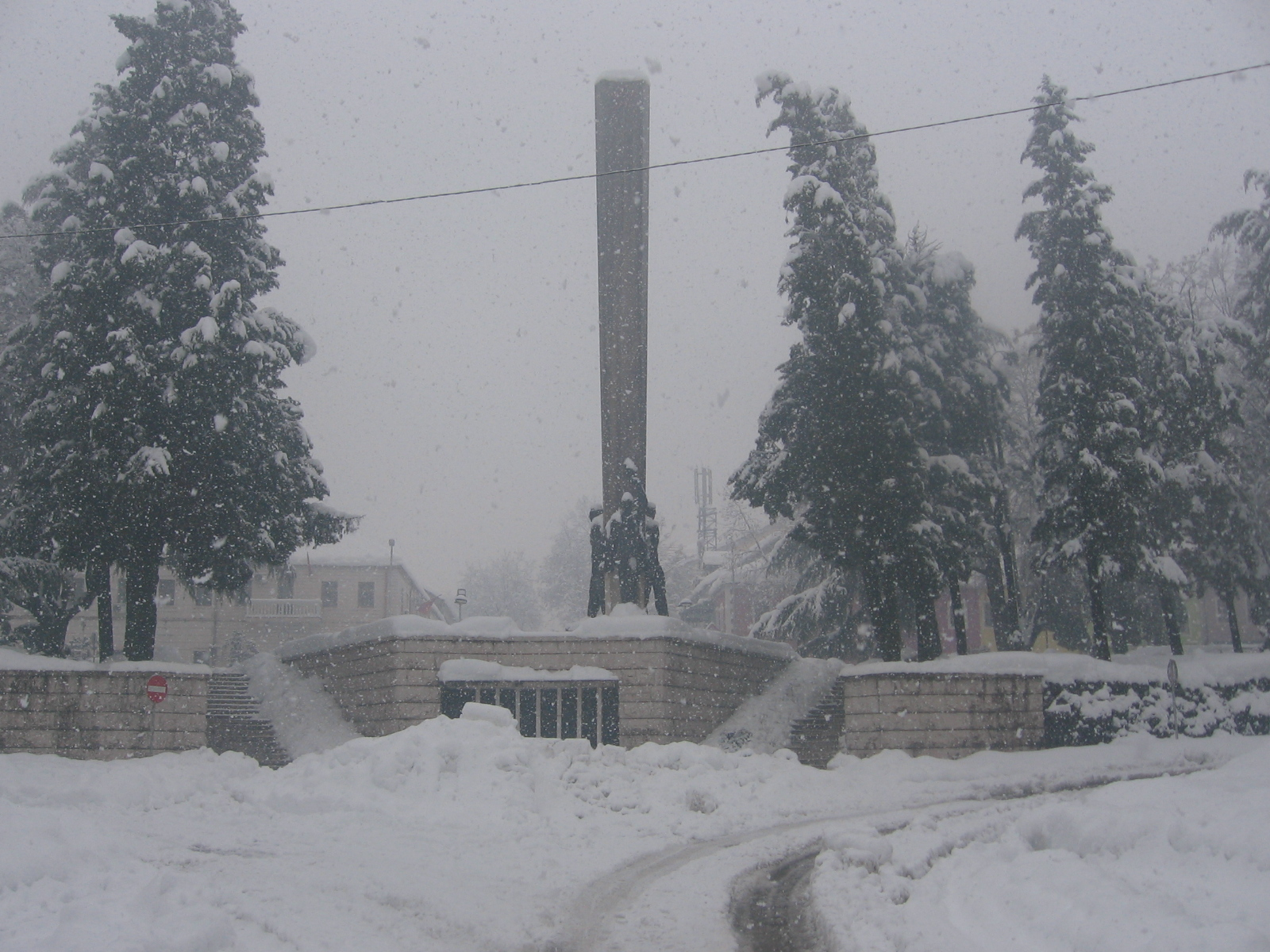
- World War II monument in Danilovgrad's main square

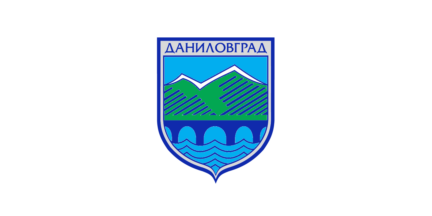
- Flag Coat of arms

- Location within Montenegro
- Coordinates: 42.61°N 19.05°E
- Country: Montenegro
- Municipality: Danilovgrad
- Established: 1869
- Settlements: 80

Government
  - Type: Mayor-Assembly
  - Mayor: Aleksandar Grgurović (PES!)

Area
  - Town and municipality: 501 km^{2} (193 sq mi)

Population (2011 census)
  - Density: 33/km^{2} (85/sq mi)
  - Urban: 5,156
  - Rural: 11,620
  - Municipality: 18,472
- Time zone: UTC+1 (CET)
  - Summer (DST): UTC+2 (CEST)
- Postal code: 81410
- Area code: +382 20
- ISO 3166-2 code: ME-07
- Car plates: DG
- Climate: Cfa
- Website: http://danilovgrad.me/

Danilovgrad (Montenegrin Cyrillic: Даниловград) is a town in central Montenegro. It has a population of 6,852, according to the 2011 census. It is situated in the Danilovgrad Municipality which lies along the main route between Montenegro's two largest cities, Podgorica and Nikšić. Via villages, Danilovgrad forms part of a conurbation with Podgorica.

The town of Danilovgrad is located in the Bjelopavlići plain, a fertile valley of the Zeta River. It is the centre of the Danilovgrad municipality, which has a population of 18,472.

== History ==
Historical affiliations

- Illyria (9th century BCE – 33 BCE)
- Roman Republic (33 BCE – 27 BCE)
- Roman Empire (27 BCE – 476)
- Byzantine Empire (476 – 997)
- First Bulgarian Empire (997 – 1018)
- Byzantine Empire (1018 – 1040)
- Dioclea (1040 – 1186)
- Grand Principality of Serbia (1186 – 1217)
- Kingdom of Serbia (1217 – 1346)
- Serbian Empire (1346 – 1371)
- Zeta under the Balšići (1371 – 1421)
- Serbian Despotate (1421 – 1441)
- Kingdom of Bosnia (1441 – 1444)
- Republic of Venice (1444 – 1448)
- Serbian Despotate (1448 – 1452)
- Principality of Zeta (1452 – 1474)
- Ottoman Empire (1474 – 1757)
- Bushati Pashalik, (de facto independent) (1757 – 1796)
- Prince-Bishopric of Montenegro (1796 – 1852)
- Principality of Montenegro (1852 – 1910)
- Kingdom of Montenegro (1910 – 1916)
- Austria-Hungary (1916 – 1918)
- Kingdom of Yugoslavia (1918 – 1941)
- Kingdom of Italy (1941 – 1943)
- Greater German Reich (1943 – 1944)
- SFR Yugoslavia (SR Montenegro) (1944 – 1992)
- FR Yugoslavia ( Republic of Montenegro) (1992 – 2006)
- Montenegro (2006 – present)

In the surroundings of Danilovgrad, there are remains of Gradina (Martinići), dating back to the time of the Serbian ruler Petar Gojniković, from the Vlastimirović dynasty. The court was built by another member of the dynasty, prince Mutimir, who was also once buried in there. Gradina is also a prominent seat from the Nemanjić period, believed to be the birthplace of Rastko Nemanjić, also known as Saint Sava, the founder of the Serbian Orthodox Church.

Danilovgrad was founded with the purpose of being the capital of Montenegro. Foundations for this planned city were first laid by King Nikola I in 1870. However, after the cities of Nikšić and Podgorica were liberated from Ottoman hands, during the Congress of Berlin, its significance diminished. It was named after Nicholas' predecessor, Prince Danilo.

=== World War II ===
On May 31, 1944, a USAF Consolidated B-24 Liberator crashed in Danilovgrad. Although its entire crew of 10 ejected and survived, they were later caught and became prisoners of war. On July 23, 1944, at least 48 members of the League of Communist Youth of Yugoslavia were killed in a mass execution by Chetniks in the village of Lazine.

=== During the Yugoslav Wars ===
From 14 to 15 April 1995, a pogrom drove out the Romani population in one of Danilovgrad's neighborhoods, Božova Glavica.

On 24 March 1999, the Milovan Šaranović barracks in Danilovgrad were bombed by NATO aircraft, killing a Yugoslav Army soldier named Saša Stojić. He was the first victim of the NATO bombing of Yugoslavia.

== Climate ==
Like many parts of Montenegro, Danilovgrad has a humid subtropical climate (Cfa according to the Köppen climate classification) with cool winters and hot, drier summers. On 8 August 2012, Danilovgrad recorded a temperature of 44.8 °C (112.6 °F), which is the highest temperature to have ever been recorded in Montenegro.

== Demographics ==
According to the 2011 census, the population of the town was 5,156.

Ethnicity in 2011
Ethnicity	Number	Percentage
Montenegrins	3,637	70.5%
Serbs	1,118	21.7%
Albanians	20	0.4%
Russians	14	0.3%
Croats	8	0.2%
Roma	7	0.1%
other/undeclared	352	6.8%
Total	5,156	100%

Source: Statistical Office of Montenegro - MONSTAT, Census 2011

Religion (2011 Census)	Number
Eastern Orthodoxy	4,762
Islam	80
Catholicism	23
Christians	11
Protestants	0
Jehovah Witness	0
Buddhist	0
Adventist	7
Agnosticism	0
Atheism	57
Undeclared	128
Other	83

== Sports ==
The local football team is FK Iskra, who have been playing in the country's top tier since 2015. They host their games at the Braća Velašević Stadium. The town's basketball team is KK Danilovgrad and RK Danilovgrad is the handball club.

== Transport ==
Danilovgrad is situated approximately halfway between two largest Montenegrin cities, Podgorica and Nikšić, on the main road that connects these two. It is also served by the Nikšić–Podgorica railway.

Podgorica Airport is 30 km (19 mi) away, and has regular flights to Belgrade, Budapest, Bari, Zagreb, Skopje, Zürich, Frankfurt, Ljubljana, Paris, Rome and Vienna.

== International relations ==
=== Twin towns – sister cities ===
Danilovgrad is twinned with:

- Crvenka (Kula), Serbia
- Donetsk, Ukraine
- Grodzisk Mazowiecki, Poland
- Roosendaal, Netherlands
- Serpukhov, Russia
