= 2025–26 FK Sutjeska Nikšić season =

Football club season

FK Sutjeska Nikšić
2025–26 season
- Manager: Dejan Jelenić
- Stadium: Gradski stadion (Nikšić)
- Montenegrin First League: 1st
- UEFA Conference League: 2QR
- Montenegrin Cup: Quarter-finals
- Top goalscorer: League: Andrija Ražnatović (4); All: Andrija Ražnatović, Vasilije Čavor (4)

The 2025–26 season is FK Sutjeska Nikšić's 78th season in the club's history and their 20th consecutive season in the top flight of Montenegrin football. In addition to the domestic league, the club is also participating in the Montenegrin Cup and the qualifying rounds of the UEFA Conference League.

== Transfers ==
=== In ===
Date	Pos.	No.	Player	From	Fee
1 July 2025	MF	55	(Montenegro) Aleksandar Šćekić	(Serbia) Partizan	Free
1 July 2025	DF	6	(Montenegro) Radoš Dedić	(Montenegro) Petrovac	Free
1 July 2025	MF	19	(Montenegro) Marko Šimun	(Montenegro) Petrovac	Free
1 July 2025	FW	24	(Montenegro) Vasilije Čavor	(Montenegro) Bokelj	unknown
1 July 2025	FW	2	(Montenegro) Aleksa Golubović	(Montenegro) Petrovac	Free
1 July 2025	MF	88	(Montenegro) Medo Juković	(Montenegro) Jedinstvo	Free
21 July 2025	FW	50	(Montenegro) Marko Brnović	(Serbia) Sloboda	Free
29 July 2025	DF	22	(Montenegro) Andrija Ražnatović	(Czech Republic) Karviná	Free
29 July 2025	FW	89	(Serbia) Nikola Furtula	(Serbia) Grafičar	Free
29 August 2025	MF	27	(Senegal) Mamadou Camara	(France) Lens	Free

=== Out ===
Date	Pos.	No.	Player	To	Fee
1 July 2025	FW		(Montenegro) Lazar Zizić	(Montenegro) Podgorica	Free
17 July 2025	FW		(Montenegro) Nikola Janjić	(Croatia) Zrinjski	Free
6 August 2025	FW		(Montenegro) Matija Gardašević	(Montenegro) Igalo 1929	Loan
7 August 2025	FW		(Montenegro) Danijel Nikolić	(Montenegro) Iskra	Loan

== Squad ==
As of 10 December 2025

Note: Flags indicate national team as defined under FIFA eligibility rules; some limited exceptions apply. Players may hold more than one non-FIFA nationality.

No.	Pos.	Nation	Player
1	GK	MNE	Vladan Giljen (captain)
2	DF	MNE	Aleksa Golubović
3	MF	SRB	Aleksandar Desančić
5	DF	MNE	Igor Pajović
6	DF	MNE	Radoš Dedić
7	FW	MNE	Ivan Vukčević
9	FW	MNE	Petar Aničić
10	FW	MNE	Balša Tošković
15	DF	MNE	Boris Kopitović
16	DF	MNE	Ognjen Đinović
17	DF	MNE	Todor Mijanić

No.	Pos.	Nation	Player
19	MF	MNE	Marko Šimun
22	DF	MNE	Andrija Ražnatović
23	GK	MNE	Radoš Dubljević
24	DF	MNE	Vasilije Čavor
25	DF	MNE	Marko Đukanović
27	MF	SEN	Mamadou Camara
31	GK	MNE	Stojan Vukčević
34	DF	MNE	Aleksandar Vlahović
55	MF	MNE	Aleksandar Šćekić
70	FW	MNE	Vasko Kalezić
88	MF	MNE	Medo Juković
89	FW	SRB	Nikola Furtula
91	DF	MNE	Bojan Damjanović

== Pre-season and friendlies ==
Sutjeska began their pre-season with a game against OFK Beograd on 21 June 2025. After that they played three more friendlies against Red Star Belgrade, Dečić and Spartak Subotica.

Win Draw Loss Fixtures

21 June 2025 Friendly	OFK Beograd	0–0	Sutjeska	Belgrade, Serbia
18:25 CET		Report		Stadium: Kraljevica Stadium

24 June 2025 Friendly	Red Star Belgrade	5–0	Sutjeska	Belgrade, Serbia
18:00 CET	Tiknizyan 23'; Damjanović 57'; Leković 70'; Ilić 77'; Prutsev 89'	Report		Stadium: Red Star Stadium

28 June 2025 Friendly	Sutjeska	0–3	Dečić	Nikšić, Montenegro
18:00 CET		Report	Striković 4'; Golubović 37'; I.M Ndiaye 85'	Stadium: Gradski stadion (Nikšić)

30 June 2025 Friendly	Spartak	1–2	Sutjeska	Subotica, Serbia
18:00 CET	Mulato 61'	Report	Kalezić 24' (pen.); Tošković 56'	Stadium: Subotica City Stadium

== Competitions ==
=== Overall record ===
Competition	First match	Last match	Starting round	Final position	Record							
Competition	First match	Last match	Starting round	Final position	Pld	W	D	L	GF	GA	GD	Win %
Montenegrin First League	4 August 2025	TBD	Matchday 1	TBD	19	11	3	5	32	20	+12	57.89
Montenegrin Cup Cup	22 October 2025	26 November 2025	Round of 16	Quarter-finals	2	1	0	1	4	3	+1	50.00
UEFA Conference League	10 July 2025	31 July 2025	First qualifying round	Second qualifying round	4	1	0	3	6	9	−3	25.00
Friendlies	21 June 2025	30 June 2025	vs OFK Beograd	vs FK Spartak Subotica	4	1	1	2	2	9	−7	25.00
Total					29	14	4	11	44	41	+3	48.28

Last updated: 10 December 2025
Source: Soccerway

=== Montenegrin First League ===
==== League table ====
Pos	Team	Pld	W	D	L	GF	GA	GD	Pts	Qualification or relegation
1	Sutjeska (C)	36	22	6	8	61	36	+25	72	Qualification for the Champions League first qualifying round
2	Mornar	36	20	9	7	51	29	+22	69	Qualification for the Conference League first qualifying round (Note: The 2025–26 Montenegrin Cup winners (Mornar) qualify for the Conference League first qualifying round. As Mornar finished second, then the berth went to the fourth place team.)
3	Petrovac	36	13	12	11	44	36	+8	51 (Note: Head to head points :Petrovac 6, Dečić 3.)	Qualification for the Conference League first qualifying round
4	Dečić	36	14	9	13	43	45	−2	51	Qualification for the Conference League first qualifying round
5	Budućnost	36	13	9	14	36	35	+1	48	

Source: Football Association of Montenegro (in Montenegrin)
Rules for classification: 1) Points; 2) Head-to-head points; 3) Head-to-head goal difference; 4) Head-to-head goals scored; 5) Goal difference; 6) Goals scored; 7) Draw.
(C) Champions

==== Results summary ====
Overall								Home						Away					
Pld	W	D	L	GF	GA	GD	Pts	W	D	L	GF	GA	GD	W	D	L	GF	GA	GD
19	11	3	5	32	20	+12	36	7	1	2	20	8	+12	4	2	3	12	12	0

Last updated: 10 December 2025.
Source: Football Association of Montenegro

==== Results by round ====
Round	1	2	3	4	5	6	7	8	9	10	11	12	13	14	15	16	17	18	19
Ground	H	A	H	A	H	H	A	H	A	A	H	A	H	A	A	H	A	H	H
Result	W	W	D	L	W	W	L	W	D	L	L	W	W	W	D	W	W	W	L
Position	1	1	2	3	1	1	1	1	1	1	3	1	1	1	1	1	1	1	1
Points	3	6	7	7	10	13	13	16	17	17	17	20	23	26	27	30	33	36	36

Updated to match(es) played on 10 December 2025. Source: Football Association of Montenegro
A = Away; H = Home; W = Win; D = Draw; L = Loss; P = Postponed

==== Matches ====
Win Draw Loss Fixtures

4 August 2025 1	Sutjeska Nikšić	3-0	Mornar	Nikšić
22:00	Balša Tošković 55'; Vasilije Čavor 63'; Radoš Dedić (yellow card) 77'; Marko Šimun (yellow card) 79'; Kalezić 90+3'	Report	Škrijelj (yellow card) 69'	Stadium: Gradski stadion Attendance: 600; Referee: (Montenegro) Dalibor Vujisić

10 August 2025 2	Budućnost	0-1	Sutjeska Nikšić	Podgorica
21:00	Orahovac (yellow card) 8'	Report	Ognjen Đinović (yellow card) 25'; Piščević 61' (o.g.); Radoš Dedić (yellow card) 82'	Stadium: Podgorica City Stadium; Attendance: 1,500; Referee: (Montenegro) Nikola Dabanović

17 August 2025 3	Sutjeska Nikšić	1-1	Petrovac	Nikšić
21:00	Vasilije Čavor 17'; Šćekić (yellow card) 63'	Report	Bašić 45+1'; Fićović (yellow card) 49'; Merdović (yellow card) 58'; Danilo Pešukić (yellow card) 81'; Žarko Popović (yellow card) 84'	Stadium: Gradski stadion Attendance: 500; Referee: (Montenegro) Miloš Bošković

24 August 2025 4	Jezero	2-1	Sutjeska Nikšić	Plav
20:00	Nenad Krivokapić 45+1'; Petar Bogdanović 51'	Report	Andrija Ražnatović 55'; Petar Aničić (yellow card) 82'	Stadium: Stadion Pod Racinom; Attendance: 500; Referee: (Montenegro) Nikola Dabanović

30 August 2025 5	Sutjeska Nikšić	5-2	Bokelj	Nikšić
20:00	Nikola Furtula 15' (pen.); Marko Šimun 40' (pen.) 58'; Petar Aničić 42'; Kopitović (yellow card) 76'; Kalezić 90'	Report	Žarko Vilotijević (red card) 14'; Kordić (yellow card) 50'; Janketić 57' 69'	Stadium: Gradski stadion Attendance: 400; Referee: (Montenegro) Nikola Cvijović

13 September 2025 6	Sutjeska Nikšić	5-2	Arsenal Tivat	Nikšić
20:00	Marko Šimun (yellow card) 39'; Radoš Dedić 57'; Vukčević 69'	Report		Stadium: Gradski stadion Attendance: 400; Referee: (Montenegro) Miloš Savović

17 September 2025 7	Dečić	3-1	Sutjeska Nikšić	Tuzi
19:00	Božović 6' (pen.); Trimror Selimi 28'; Golubović 49'; Tomašević (yellow card) 76'	Report	Kopitović (yellow card) 53'; Marko Šimun (yellow card) 68'; Vukčević 70'	Stadium: Stadion Tuško Polje; Attendance: 650; Referee: (Montenegro) Mladen Knežević

21 September 2025 8	Sutjeska Nikšić	3-1	Mladost DG	Nikšić
18:00	Bojan Damjanović (yellow card) 10'; Aleksa Golubović 27'; Vasilije Čavor 68'; Todor Miljanić 73'	Report	Balša Mrvaljević 88'	Stadium: Gradski stadion Attendance: 400; Referee: (Montenegro) Miloš Bešović

=== Montenegrin Cup ===
The draw for the Montenegrin Cup Round of 16 was held on 15 October 2025 and was played on 22 October 2025.

22 October 2025 Montenegrin Cup Round of 16	Sutjeska	3–1	Lovćen	Nikšić
16:00 CET	Tošković 13'; Juković 45+2'; Damjanović 84'	Report	Šimun 48' (o.g.)	Stadium: Gradski stadion (Nikšić); Attendance: 150; Referee: Mladen Knežević

26 November 2025 Montenegrin Cup Quarter finals	Dečić	2–1	Sutjeska	Tuzi
15:00 CET	Tošković 56'; Pavlićević 85'	Report	Vukčević 90+2'	Stadium: Stadion Tuško Polje; Attendance: 150; Referee: Miloš Bešović

=== UEFA Conference League ===
Sutjeska qualified to the UEFA Conference League first qualifying round by finishing third in the 2024–25 Montenegrin First League.

Win Draw Loss Fixtures

10 July 2025 UEFA Conference League 1QR	Sutjeska (Montenegro)	1–2	(Belarus) Dynamo Brest	Nikšić, Montenegro
18:30 CET	Kalezić 90' (pen.)	Report	Bykov 25'; Juković 90+4' (o.g.)	Stadium: Gradski stadion (Nikšić); Referee: Jakob Semler (Austria)

17 July 2025 UEFA Conference League 1QR	Dynamo Brest (Belarus)	0–2	(Montenegro) Sutjeska	Zalaegerszeg, Hungary
18:30 CET		Report	Vukčević 74'; Čavor 89'	Stadium: ZTE Arena; Attendance: 0 Referee: Mehmet Türkmen (Turkey)

24 July 2025 UEFA Conference League 2QR	Sutjeska (Montenegro)	1–2	(Israel) Beitar Jerusalem	Nikšić, Montenegro
18:30 CET	Kalezić 28'	Report	Shua 34'; Atzili 87'	Stadium: Gradski stadion (Nikšić); Referee: Georgi Ginchev (Bulgaria)

31 July 2025 UEFA Conference League 2QR	Beitar Jerusalem (Israel)	5–2	(Montenegro) Sutjeska	Ploiești, Romania
18:30 CET	Atzili 42'; Shua 45+5'; Morozov 51'; Kalu 83'; Muzie 88'	Report	Tošković 11' (pen.); Kopitović 28'	Stadium: Stadionul Ilie Oană; Referee: Ishmael Barbara (Malta)
