= 2026–27 Montenegrin First League =

21st season of the Montenegrin First League

Montenegrin First League
- Season: 2026–27
- Dates: 1 August 2026 – May 2027
- Matches: 45
- Goals: 93 (2.07 per match)
- Top goalscorer: Abderahmane Soussi (8 goals)
- All statistics correct as of 5 October 2026.

The 2026–27 Montenegrin First League (known as the MeridianBet 1.CFL for sponsorship reasons) is the 21st season of the Montenegrin First League, the top-tier football league in Montenegro. The season began on 1 August 2026. Sutjeska are the defending champions.

== Teams ==
2026–27 clubs

The league consists of ten teams: the top nine teams from the previous season, and one team promoted from the Montenegrin Second League.

The promoted team is Otrant-Olympic, returning to the top flight after a one-year absence, replacing the relegated Jedinstvo Bijelo Polje, who finished bottom of the previous season.

=== Stadiums and locations ===
Team	City	Stadium	Capacity
FK Arsenal Tivat	Tivat	Stadion u Parku	1,000
FK Bokelj	Kotor	Stadion pod Vrmcem	425
FK Budućnost Podgorica	Podgorica	Stadion pod Goricom	11,080
FK Dečić	Tuzi	Arena Besa	1,080
FK Jezero	Plav	Stadion Pod Racinom	2,500
OFK Mladost Donja Gorica	Podgorica	DG Arena	3,791
FK Mornar	Bar	Stadion Topolica	2,200
FK Otrant-Olympic	Ulcinj	Stadion Olimpik	1,500
OFK Petrovac	Petrovac	Stadion Mitar Mićo Goliš	1,630
FK Sutjeska Nikšić	Nikšić	Stadion kraj Bistrice	5,214

=== Personnel and kits ===
Note: Flags indicate national team as has been defined under FIFA eligibility rules. Players may hold more than one non-FIFA nationality.

Team	Coach	Captain	Kit manufacturer	Shirt sponsor
Arsenal Tivat	(Montenegro) Radisav Dragićević	(Montenegro) Bojan Zogović	(Italy) Macron	Porto Montenegro
Bokelj	(Montenegro) Nenad Brnović	(Montenegro) Marko Čavor	(Serbia) NAAI	SBbet
Budućnost Podgorica	(Montenegro) Srđan Nikić (interim)	(Montenegro) Petar Grbić	(Italy) Macron	SBbet
Dečić	(Montenegro) Ivan Brnović	(Montenegro) Jonathan Dreshaj	(Serbia) Seven	Castellana
Jezero	(Montenegro) Miodrag Džudović	(Montenegro) Igor Asanović	(Italy) Macron	Samont
Mladost Donja Gorica	(Montenegro) Marko Šćepanović	(Montenegro) Dušan Vuković	(Spain) Luanvi	Lob bet
Mornar	(Montenegro) Vesko Stešević	(Montenegro) Andrija Kaluđerović	(Serbia) Seven	Municipality of Bar
Otrant-Olympic	(Montenegro) Vacant	(Montenegro) TBD	(Italy) Macron	TBD
Petrovac	(Montenegro) Zdravko Dragićević	(Montenegro) Dejan Boljević	(Italy) Macron	Municipality of Budva
Sutjeska Nikšić	(Montenegro) Milija Savović	(Montenegro) Vladan Giljen	(Serbia) Ardu Sport	

== League table ==
Pos	Team	Pld	W	D	L	GF	GA	GD	Pts	Qualification or relegation
1	Otrant-Olympic	15	8	3	4	28	19	+9	27	Qualification for the Champions League first qualifying round
2	Budućnost	16	7	5	4	20	16	+4	26	Qualification for the Conference League first qualifying round
3	Mornar	15	6	6	3	21	15	+6	24	
4	Sutjeska	15	6	5	4	19	13	+6	23	
5	Dečić	14	6	3	5	14	11	+3	21	
6	Bokelj	14	5	4	5	10	11	−1	19	
7	Jezero	16	4	7	5	17	22	−5	19	
8	Petrovac	14	4	6	4	15	13	+2	18	Qualification for the Montenegrin First League play-off
9	Mladost Donja Gorica	15	3	3	9	11	25	−14	12	Qualification for the Montenegrin First League play-off
10	Arsenal Tivat	14	1	6	7	10	20	−10	9	Relegation to the 2. CFL

Updated to match(es) played on 13 November 2026. Source: FootyStats
Rules for classification: 1) Points; 2) Head-to-head points; 3) Head-to-head goal difference; 4) Head-to-head goals scored; 5) Goal difference; 6) Goals scored.

=== Results ===
Home \ Away	ARS	BOK	BUD	DEC	JEZ	MLA	MOR	OTR	PET	SUT
Arsenal Tivat							1–2	1–2		0–2
Bokelj										
Budućnost Podgorica					3–0	0–2		2–0	4–1	0–0
Dečić			0–1							
Jezero							3–3			
Mladost Donja Gorica								2–2		
Mornar	2–1	2–0		1–1				1–0		0–1
Otrant-Olympic					4–1					
Petrovac										0–0
Sutjeska Nikšić				2–0		5–1	1–0			

Updated to match(es) played on 25 October 2026. Source: Scoresway
Legend: Blue = home team win; Yellow = draw; Red = away team win.

== Top scorers ==
As of 25 October 2026

Rank	Player	Club	Goals
1	(Morocco) Abderahmane Soussi	Mornar	8
2	(Kosovo) Alban Taipi	Otrant-Olympic	5
2	(Montenegro) Valentin Rudović	Otrant-Olympic	5
4	(Montenegro) Igor Vukčević	Arsenal	4
5	(Japan) Ayumu Nishimura	Jezero	3
5	(Montenegro) Balša Tošković	Sutjeska	3
5	(Montenegro) Dejan Perović	Bokelj	3
5	(Montenegro) Danilo Vukanić	Budućnost	3
5	(Montenegro) Milivoje Raičević	Jezero	3
5	(Montenegro) Petar Vujović	Budućnost	3
5	(Ivory Coast) Mišel Jao	Mornar	3
