= 2025–26 Montenegrin Cup =

Montenegrin Cup
Tournament details
- Country: Montenegro
- Dates: 22 October 2025 – 28 May 2026
- Teams: 16

Final positions
- Champions: Mornar (1st title)
- Runners-up: Dečić

Tournament statistics
- Matches played: 17
- Goals scored: 49 (2.88 per match)

The 2025–26 Montenegrin Cup was the 20th edition of the knockout football tournament in Montenegro, the tournament began on 22 October 2025. The winners of this edition of the Montenegrin Cup qualified for the 2026–27 UEFA Conference League first qualifying round. The defending champions were Dečić.

Mornar won the cup on 28 May 2026 (their first Montenegrin Cup win), defeating Dečić, the defending champions, 1–0 in the final.

== Round of 16 ==
The draw for the round of 16 was held on 15 October 2025, the matches will be played 22 October 2025.

=== Summary ===
Team 1	Score	Team 2
Igalo (2)	0–4	Mladost DG (1)
Iskra (2)	3–0	Arsenal (1)
Dečić (1)	3–2	Budućnost (1)
Mornar (1)	1–0	Grbalj (2)
Jedinstvo (1)	0–2	Petrovac (1)
Otrant (2)	1–1 (5–3 p)	Rudar (2)
Sutjeska (1)	3–1	Lovćen (2)
Jezero (1)	3–3 (5–4 p)	Bokelj (1)

=== Matches ===
22 October 2025	Igalo	0–4	Mladost DG	Igalo
14:30 CET		Report	Faust 18'; Pavlićević 25'; Stephano 37'; Vuković 53'	Stadium: Stadion Solila; Attendance: 60; Referee: Vladimir Bjelica

22 October 2025	Otrant-Olympic	1–1 (5–3 p)	Rudar	Ulcinj
14:30 CET	Sekulić 55' (o.g.)	Report	Ajduković 14'	Stadium: Stadion Olympic; Attendance: 150; Referee: Manojlo Sekulić

22 October 2025	Jedinstvo	0–2	Petrovac	Bijelo Polje
15:00 CET		Report	Arambašić 48'; Pešukić 89'	Stadium: Gradski stadion (Bijelo Polje); Attendance: 180; Referee: Nikola Vođević

22 October 2025	Dečić	3–2	Budućnost	Tuzi
15:00 CET	Golubović 38'; Kajević 54'; Striković 81'	Report	Raspopović 48'; Grbić 90'	Stadium: Stadion Tuško Polje; Attendance: 700; Referee: Savo Vujović

22 October 2025	Iskra	3–0	Arsenal	Danilovgrad
15:30 CET	Pavićević 15', 16'; Šćepanović 81'	Report		Stadium: Braća Velašević Stadium; Attendance: 100; Referee: Ivan Šarac

22 October 2025	Jezero	3–3 (8–7 p)	Bokelj	Berane
15:30 CET	Gjolaj 28'; Redžepagić 48'; Osmanović 62'	Report	Vilojetović 15' (pen.); Kokkinis 33'; Kodrić 41'	Stadium: Gradski Stadion (Berane); Attendance: 120; Referee: Luka Pejović

22 October 2025	Sutjeska	3–1	Lovćen	Nikšić
16:00 CET	Tošković 13'; Juković 45+2'; Damjanović 84'	Report	Šimun 48' (o.g.)	Stadium: Gradski stadion (Nikšić); Attendance: 150; Referee: Mladen Knežević

22 October 2025	Mornar	1–0	Grbalj	Bar
17:00 CET	Michael Yao 88'	Report		Stadium: Gradski stadion (Nikšić); Attendance: 100; Referee: Davor Božović

== Quarter-finals ==
=== Summary ===
Team 1	Score	Team 2
Dečić (1)	2–1	Sutjeska (1)
Mladost DG (1)	0–2	Jezero (1)
Iskra (2)	0–4	Mornar (1)
Petrovac (1)	2–2 (4–5 p)	Otrant-Olympic (2)

=== Matches ===
26 November 2025	Dečić	2–1	Sutjeska	Tuzi
15:00 CET	Braunović 56'; Pavlićević 85'	Report	I. Vukčević 90+2'	Stadium: Stadion Tuško Polje; Attendance: 150; Referee: Miloš Bešović

26 November 2025	Mladost DG	0–2	Jezero	Podgorica
14:00 CET		Report	Krivokapić 40' 45+2'	Stadium: DG Arena; Attendance: 90; Referee: Dalibor Vujisić

26 November 2025	Iskra	0–4	Mornar	Danilovgrad
13:00 CET		Report	Dubljević 29'; Denković 37' (pen.) 56'; Pavićević 69'	Stadium: Braća Velašević Stadium; Attendance: 100; Referee: Branko Odalović

26 November 2025	Petrovac	2–2 (4–5 p)	Otrant-Olympic	Petrovac
14:30 CET	Carević 1' 23'	Report	Franeta 36' (o.g.); Sefa 57'	Stadium: Stadion Mitar Mićo Goliš; Attendance: 200; Referee: Luka Pejović

== Semi-finals ==
=== Summary ===
Team 1	Agg.	Team 2	1st leg	2nd leg
Otrant-Olympic (2)	1–3	Dečić (1)	1–2	0–1
Mornar (1)	3–1	Jezero (1)	1–0	2–1

=== First legs ===
22 April 2026	Otrant-Olympic	1–2	Dečić	Ulcinj
16:30 CEST	Chagas 81'	Report	Golubović 31'; Bajović 85'	Stadium: Stadion Olympic; Attendance: 600; Referee: Nikola Vođević

22 April 2026	Mornar	1–0	Jezero	Bar
18:30 CEST	Škrijelj 19'	Report		Stadium: Stadion Topolica; Attendance: 350; Referee: Miloš Savović

=== Second legs ===
6 May 2026	Dečić	1–0 (3–1 agg.)	Otrant-Olympic	Tuzi
18:30 CEST	Sekulović 80' (pen.)	Report		Stadium: Stadion Tuško Polje; Attendance: 800; Referee: Davor Božović

6 May 2026	Jezero	1–2 (1–3 agg.)	Mornar	Berane
16:30 CEST	Maksimović 63'	Report	Sekulić 32'; P. Vukčević 44'	Stadium: Gradski stadion Attendance: 350; Referee: Branko Odalović

== Final ==
The final was held between the two semi-final winners.

28 May 2026
20:30 CEST

Dečić	0–1	Mornar
	Report	Denković 67'

Podgorica City Stadium, Podgorica
Attendance: 3,500
Referee: Miloš Bošković

== See also ==
- 2025–26 Montenegrin First League
- 2025–26 Montenegrin Second League
