= Luka Maraš =

Montenegrin footballer

Personal information
- Full name: Luka Maraš
- Date of birth: 24 May 1996 (age 30)
- Place of birth: Podgorica, FR Yugoslavia
- Position: Winger

Team information
- Current team: Bokelj
- Number: 11

Youth career
- 2005–2013: Bokelj

Senior career*
Years	Team	Apps	(Gls)
2013–2019	Bokelj	168	(13)
2019–2023	Podgorica	108	(7)
2023–2025	Arsenal Tivat	45	(2)
2025–	Bokelj	32	(3)

International career
2015	Montenegro U19	0	(0)
2022–	Montenegro U21	2	(0)
- * Club domestic league appearances and goals as of 25 May 2026

Luka Maraš (born 24 May 1996) is a Montenegrin professional footballer who plays for Bokelj. Before that, he played for Bokelj and Podgorica.
