= Nikola Čelebić =

Montenegrin footballer

Personal information
- Date of birth: 4 July 1989 (age 37)
- Place of birth: Titograd, SFR Yugoslavia
- Height: 1.86 m (6 ft 1 in)
- Position: Defender

Youth career
- –2007: Partizan

Senior career*
Years	Team	Apps	(Gls)
2007–2008	Sopot	8	(0)
2008–2009	Jedinstvo Bijelo Polje	6	(0)
2009–2010	Bratstvo Cijevna	2	(0)
2010–2011	Petrovac	29	(0)
2011–2012	BSK Borča	35	(0)
2013–2014	Petrovac	36	(0)
2014–2015	Budućnost	6	(0)
2015–2016	Bokelj	43	(0)
2016–2017	Radnik Bijeljina	3	(0)
2017	Grbalj	25	(0)
2018–2019	Mladost Lješkopolje	8	(2)
2019–2022	Podgorica	79	(5)
2022–2023	Arsenal Tivat	33	(2)
2024–2025	Iskra	20	(0)
2025	Balkan Eagles		
Total		310+	(9+)

International career
2007–2008	Montenegro U19		
- * Club domestic league appearances and goals as of 16 July 2025

Nikola Čelebić (Cyrillic: Никола Челебић; born 4 July 1989) is a former Montenegrin professional footballer who last played as a defender before he was banned for matchfixing.

== Club career ==
Born in Titograd, SFR Yugoslavia (nowadays Podgorica, Montenegro), he played in the youth teams of FK Partizan. His first season as senior was with FK Sopot in the 2007-08 Serbian League Belgrade, third level league in Serbia.

In summer 2008 he moved back to Montenegro to play with FK Jedinstvo Bijelo Polje in the Montenegrin First League. After that season, he will play in 2009–10 with FK Bratstvo Cijevna before returning a year later to the Montenegrin top league, this time to play with OFK Petrovac.

In summer 2011 he was back in Serbia, this time to play with top-level club, FK BSK Borča. He plays as a left-back.

In 2025, the player was banned from all footballing activity for life due to match fixing.

== International career ==
He was part of the Montenegrin U19 national team.
