= Kašćelan =

Kašćelan (Montenegrin Cyrillic: Kaшћeлaн) is a Montenegrin surname. Notable people with the surname include:

- Mladen Kašćelan (born 1983), Montenegrin football manager and player
- Predrag Kašćelan (born 1990), Montenegrin footballer
- Vladimir Kašćelan (born 2004), Montenegrin footballer
