= 2025–26 Montenegrin First League =

Montenegrin First League
- Season: 2025–26
- Dates: 4 August 2025 – 24 May 2026
- Champions: Sutjeska (6th title)
- Relegated: Jedinstvo
- Champions League: Sutjeska
- Conference League: Mornar; Petrovac; Dečić
- Matches: 180
- Goals: 426 (2.37 per match)
- Top goalscorer: Balša Sekulić (15 goals)
- Biggest home win: Petrovac 4–0 Mladost DG (13 September 2025) Jezero 4-0 Dečić (13 September 2025) Petrovac 4–0 Jedinstvo (22 November 2025)
- Biggest away win: Bokelj 0–2 Budućnost (21 September 2025) Dečić 0-2 Bokelj (27 September 2025) Sutjeska Nikšić 0-2 Budućnost (5 October 2025) Jezero 1-3 Petrovac (5 October 2025)
- Highest scoring: Bokelj 4–5 Sutjeska Nikšić (1 November 2025)
- Longest winning run: Mornar (5 matches)
- Longest unbeaten run: Petrovac and Jedinstvo (6 matches)
- Longest losing run: Bokelj and Budućnost (4 matches)
- All statistics correct as of 20 May 2026.

The 2025–26 Montenegrin First League was the 20th season of the first tier association football in the country of Montenegro. The season began on 4 August 2025.

== Teams ==
2025–26 clubs

The league consisted of ten teams; the top nine teams from the previous season, and one team promoted from the Montenegrin Second League. Budućnost Podgorica entered the season as defending champions.

The promoted team was the 2024–25 Montenegrin Second League champions Mladost Donja Gorica (returning to the top-flight after a single-year absence). They replaced the 2024–25 Montenegrin First League bottom-placed team Otrant-Olympic.

=== Stadiums and locations ===
Team	City	Stadium	Capacity
FK Arsenal Tivat	Tivat	Stadion u Parku	1,200
FK Bokelj	Kotor	Stadion pod Vrmcem	425
FK Budućnost Podgorica	Podgorica	Stadion pod Goricom	11,080
FK Dečić	Tuzi	Stadion Tuško Polje	1,001
FK Jedinstvo Bijelo Polje	Bijelo Polje	Gradski stadion	4,000
FK Jezero	Plav	Stadion Pod Racinom	2,500
OFK Mladost Donja Gorica	Podgorica	DG Arena	3,791
FK Mornar	Bar	Stadion Topolica	2,200
OFK Petrovac	Petrovac	Stadion Mitar Mićo Goliš	1,630
FK Sutjeska Nikšić	Nikšić	Stadion kraj Bistrice	5,214

=== Personnel and kits ===
Note: Flags indicate national team as has been defined under FIFA eligibility rules. Players may hold more than one non-FIFA nationality.

Team	Coach	Captain	Kit manufacturer	Shirt sponsor
Arsenal Tivat	(Montenegro) Radisav Dragićević	(Montenegro) Bojan Zogović	(Italy) Macron	Porto Montenegro
Bokelj	(Montenegro) Damir Čakar	(Montenegro) Marko Čavor	(Serbia) NAAI	SBbet
Budućnost Podgorica	(Montenegro) Ivan Delić	(Montenegro) Petar Grbić	(Italy) Macron	SBbet
Dečić	(Serbia) Nebojša Jandrić	(Montenegro) Jonathan Dreshaj	(Serbia) Seven	Castellana
Jedinstvo Bijelo Polje	(Montenegro) Sead Babača	(Montenegro) Momcilo Dulović	(Serbia) NAAI	Supermarketi Franca
Jezero	(Montenegro) Miodrag Džudović	(Montenegro) Igor Asanović	(Italy) Macron	Samont
Mladost Donja Gorica	(Montenegro) Marko Šćepanović	(Montenegro) Dušan Vuković	(Spain) Luanvi	Lob bet
Mornar	(Montenegro) Vesko Stešević	(Montenegro) Andrija Kaluđerović	(Serbia) Seven	Municipality of Bar
Petrovac	(Montenegro) Zdravko Dragićević	(Montenegro) Dejan Boljević	(Italy) Macron	Municipality of Budva
Sutjeska Nikšić	(Montenegro) Milija Savović	(Montenegro) Vladan Giljen	(Serbia) Ardu Sport	

== League table ==
Pos	Team	Pld	W	D	L	GF	GA	GD	Pts	Qualification or relegation
1	Sutjeska (C)	36	22	6	8	61	36	+25	72	Qualification for the Champions League first qualifying round
2	Mornar	36	20	9	7	51	29	+22	69	Qualification for the Conference League first qualifying round (Note: The 2025–26 Montenegrin Cup winners (Mornar) qualify for the Conference League first qualifying round. As Mornar finished second, then the berth went to the fourth place team.)
3	Petrovac	36	13	12	11	44	36	+8	51 (Note: Head to head points :Petrovac 6, Dečić 3.)	Qualification for the Conference League first qualifying round
4	Dečić	36	14	9	13	43	45	−2	51	Qualification for the Conference League first qualifying round
5	Budućnost	36	13	9	14	36	35	+1	48	
6	Mladost Donja Gorica	36	14	4	18	49	54	−5	46 (Note: Head to head points : Mladost Donja Gorica 7, Arsenal Tivat 4.)	
7	Arsenal Tivat	36	12	10	14	36	46	−10	46	
8	Jezero (O)	36	10	11	15	38	48	−10	41	Qualification for the Montenegrin First League play-off
9	Bokelj (O)	36	8	12	16	38	48	−10	36	Qualification for the Montenegrin First League play-off
10	Jedinstvo (R)	36	9	8	19	30	49	−19	35	Relegation to the 2. CFL

Source: Football Association of Montenegro (in Montenegrin)
Rules for classification: 1) Points; 2) Head-to-head points; 3) Head-to-head goal difference; 4) Head-to-head goals scored; 5) Goal difference; 6) Goals scored; 7) Draw.
(C) Champions; (O) Play-off winners; (R) Relegated

=== Results ===
Clubs were scheduled to play each other four times for a total of 36 matches each.

Home \ Away	ARS	BOK	BUD	DEC	JED	JEZ	MLA	MOR	PET	SUT
Arsenal Tivat	—	2–1	1–0	1–1	2–0	2–2	0–0	0–1	3–2	0–0
Arsenal Tivat	—	1–0	1–0	0–1	0–0	1–2	1–4	0–1	3–1	1–1
Bokelj	2–0	—	0–2	1–1	1–1	3–0	2–2	1–2	1–2	4–5
Bokelj	3–0	—	2–0	1–0	1–4	0–2	0–0	1–2	0–1	2–3
Budućnost Podgorica	4–2	0–1	—	2–0	1–1	1–1	0–1	2–0	1–1	0–1
Budućnost Podgorica	0–2	2–1	—	0–0	3–2	2–0	0–1	0–0	1–0	2–1
Dečić	4–2	0–2	1–0	—	1–0	1–0	3–2	2–1	2–2	3–1
Dečić	1–2	0–0	0–0	—	4–2	3–0	3–4	0–0	0–1	1–2
Jedinstvo Bijelo Polje	0–0	0–0	0–1	0–1	—	0–1	0–1	2–1	1–0	0–0
Jedinstvo Bijelo Polje	0–2	1–1	0–0	1–2	—	2–0	2–1	1–0	1–2	0–2
Jezero	2–0	2–2	1–2	4–0	1–2	—	1–0	2–1	1–3	2–1
Jezero	0–0	1–1	1–0	1–2	0–1	—	2–2	0–2	1–1	1–1
Mladost Donja Gorica	2–0	3–0	3–1	1–2	5–2	0–1	—	1–3	1–0	2–3
Mladost Donja Gorica	1–2	0–1	1–4	2–1	1–0	3–1	—	1–2	1–0	0–1
Mornar	2–2	0–0	1–1	1–0	3–1	2–2	2–1	—	3–1	1–0
Mornar	1–2	0–0	3–0	1–0	3–0	2–0	3–0	—	1–1	2–1
Petrovac	0–0	2–0	2–1	1–1	4–0	1–1	4–0	1–1	—	0–1
Petrovac	1–0	0–0	1–1	1–1	1–0	2–1	3–1	0–2	—	0–1
Sutjeska Nikšić	2–0	5–2	0–2	3–1	2–0	1–0	3–1	3–0	1–1	—
Sutjeska Nikšić	4–1	2–1	2–0	3–0	1–3	1–1	1–0	0–1	2–1	—

Source: Football Association of Montenegro (in Montenegrin)
Legend: Blue = home team win; Yellow = draw; Red = away team win.
For upcoming matches, an "a" indicates there is an article about the rivalry between the two participants.

== Statistics ==
=== Top goalscorers ===
As of 17 April 2026

Rank	Player	Club	Goals
1	(Montenegro) Balša Sekulić	Mornar	13
2	(Serbia) Đorđe Maksimović	Jezero	12
3	(Montenegro) Žarko Korać	Jedinstvo	10
4	(Kosovo) Trimror Selimi	Dečić	8
4	(Montenegro) Stefan Denković	Mornar	8
6	(Serbia) Savo Arambašić	Petrovac	7
6	(Montenegro) Milivoje Raičević	Jezero	7
6	(Montenegro) Andrija Ražnatović	Sutjeska	7
6	(Montenegro) Vasilije Čavor	Sutjeska	7
6	(Bosnia and Herzegovina) Adnan Bašić	Petrovac	7

== Montenegrin First League play-off ==
The eighth and ninth-placed teams (Jezero and Bokelj) faced the third and second-placed teams (Iskra and Grbalj) from the 2025–26 Montenegrin Second League in two-legged ties for the final two places in the 2026–27 Montenegrin First League.

=== Summary ===
Team 1	Agg.	Team 2	1st leg	2nd leg
Jezero	8–1	Iskra	3–0	5–1
Bokelj	2–0	Grbalj	0–0	2–0

=== Matches ===
29 May 2026
18:00 CEST

Jezero	3–0	Iskra
Osmanović 26'; Maksimović 38' (pen.), 54'	Report

Berane City Stadium, Berane
Attendance: 1,500
Referee: Dalibor Vujisić
29 May 2026
20:00 CEST

Bokelj	0–0	Grbalj
	Report

Stadion pod Vrmcem, Kotor
Attendance: 800
Referee: Miloš Bešović

3 June 2026
17:30 CEST

Grbalj	0–2	Bokelj
	Report	Stamenković 36'; Mugoša 48'

Stadion Donja Sutvara, Radanovići
Attendance: 350
Referee: Miloš Bošković
3 June 2026
20:00 CEST

Iskra	1–5	Jezero
Šćepanović 68'	Report	Maksimović 21'; Tučević 25'; Adžović 48'; Rolović 73'; Redžepagić 81'

Braća Velašević Stadium, Danilovgrad
Attendance: 500
Referee: Miloš Bešović

== See also ==
- 2025–26 Montenegrin Cup
- 2025–26 Montenegrin Second League
- 2025–26 Montenegrin Third League
