= Vladimir Kašćelan =

Montenegrin footballer

Personal information
- Full name: Vladimir Kašćelan
- Date of birth: 3 March 2004 (age 22)
- Place of birth: Kotor, Serbia and Montenegro
- Position: Midfielder

Team information
- Current team: Arsenal Tivat
- Number: 6

Youth career
- 2014–2018: Arsenal Tivat
- 2018–2020: Bokelj
- 2020–2021: Sinđelić

Senior career*
| Years | Team | Apps | (Gls) |
| 2022–2023 | Bokelj | 28 | (1) |
| 2023– | Arsenal Tivat | 40 | (2) |
- * Club domestic league appearances and goals as of 2 April 2025

Vladimir Kašćelan (born 3 March 2004) is a Montenegrin professional footballer who plays for Arsenal Tivat.

Earlier, he played for Bokelj.
