= FK Adrenalin Kotor =

Montenegrin football club

- Full name: Fudbalski klub Adrenalin Kotor
- Founded: 18 July 2024; 2 years ago
- Stadium: Auxiliary stadium of FK Bokelj
- Manager: Boško Tatar
- League: Montenegrin Third League
- 2024–25: Montenegrin Third League 5th of 7

Fudbalski klub Adrenalin Kotor is a football club based in the city of Kotor, Montenegro, that competes in the Montenegrin Third League – South division.

The club usually plays its home matches at the auxiliary stadium of FK Bokelj, but occasionally also uses the auxiliary stadium of FK Lovćen.

== History ==
Adrenalin was founded the year 2024 and they first competed in the 2024-25 Montenegrin Third League. In the 2024-25 Montenegrin Third League they would go on to finish 5th with 20 points, during that campaign they got 6 wins, 2 draws and 9 losses and a goal difference of -38. They would play their first league game against FK Budva where they lost 7-1, their first league win came in the second round against FK Sloga Radovići where they won 6-4.

== Players ==
=== Current Squad ===
As of 22 September 2025

Note: Flags indicate national team as defined under FIFA eligibility rules; some limited exceptions apply. Players may hold more than one non-FIFA nationality.

No.	Pos.	Nation	Player
1	GK	MNE	Enis Hot
8	FW	MNE	Almedin Corovic
10	FW	MNE	Mitar Kovacevic
11	FW	MNE	Strahinja Ikovic

No.	Pos.	Nation	Player
—	FW	MNE	Ljeon Dusaj

== List of seasons ==
Since the creation of FK Adrenalin they have only played 1 full season in their history, all of them being in the Montenegrin Third League

Below is a list of FK Adrenalin final placements by every single season:

Season	League	Position	P	W	D	L	F	A	GD	Pts
2024–25	Montenegrin Third League	5	18	6	3	9	36	74	-38	21
