= Petar Mališić =

Montenegrin footballer

Personal information
- Full name: Petar Mališić
- Date of birth: 4 September 2001 (age 25)
- Place of birth: Podgorica, Montenegro
- Position: Midfielder

Team information
- Current team: Smederevo
- Number: 28

Senior career*
Years	Team	Apps	(Gls)
2018–2020	OFK Titograd	1	(0)
2020–2021	Grbalj	12	(0)
2021	Petrovac	5	(0)
2021–2022	Železničar Pančevo	4	(0)
2022–2024	Arsenal Tivat	38	(0)
2024–	Smederevo	12	(0)

International career
2017	Montenegro U19	1	(0)
- * Club domestic league appearances and goals as of 1st July 2025

Petar Mališić (born 4 September 2001) is a Montenegrin professional footballer who is now playing for Smederevo 1924.

Earlier in career, Mališić played for OFK Titograd, Grbalj, Petrovac, Železničar Pančevo. and Arsenal Tivat. He also collected one cap for Montenegro U19.

== Honours ==
Arsenal Tivat

- Montenegrin Cup (runner-up): 2022–23
