= Aleksandar Macanović =

Montenegrin footballer

Personal information
- Full name: Aleksandar Macanović
- Date of birth: 16 April 1993 (age 33)
- Place of birth: Kotor, FR Yugoslavia
- Height: 1.75 m (5 ft 9 in)
- Position: Midfielder

Team information
- Current team: Arsenal Tivat
- Number: 20

Youth career
- –2013: Grbalj

Senior career*
Years	Team	Apps	(Gls)
2013–2015	Grbalj	4	(0)
2013–2014	→ Arsenal Tivat (loan)	21	(1)
2015–2017	Bokelj	77	(17)
2017–2019	Rudar Plevlja	41	(3)
2019–2020	Grbalj	27	(1)
2020–2021	FC 07 Albstadt	10	(3)
2021–2023	Bokelj	59	(5)
2023–	Arsenal Tivat	67	(1)
- * Club domestic league appearances and goals as of 1 June 2025

Aleksandar Macanović (born 16 April 1993) is a Montenegrin professional footballer who plays for Arsenal Tivat.

Macanović started his professional career in 2013 at Grbalj where he also played from 2019 to 2020. During his career, he also played two times for Bokelj. From 2017 to 2019, he played for Rudar Pljevlja and from January 2020 to June 2021, he was a member of German lower league club, FC 07 Albstadt.
