= Stefan Vico =

Montenegrin footballer

Personal information
- Date of birth: 28 February 1995 (age 31)
- Place of birth: Kotor, FR Yugoslavia (now Montenegro)
- Height: 1.77 m (5 ft 10 in)
- Position: Full-back

Team information
- Current team: Bokelj
- Number: 22

Senior career*
Years	Team	Apps	(Gls)
2013–2019	Rad	94	(0)
2014–2015	→ Žarkovo (loan)	16	(1)
2016	→ Inđija (loan)	13	(4)
2019–2020	Næstved	33	(1)
2020–2022	Javor Ivanjica	31	(0)
2023	Grafičar	8	(1)
2023	Igalo	17	(3)
2024–2025	Otrant-Olympic	43	(2)
2025–	Bokelj	29	(1)

International career^{‡}
2010	Montenegro U16	3	(0)
2013	Serbia U18	2	(0)
2013	Serbia U19	6	(0)
2015	Serbia U20	1	(0)
2016	Montenegro U21	1	(0)
- * Club domestic league appearances and goals as of 25 May 2026 ‡ National team caps and goals as of 25 March 2018

Stefan Vico (Serbian Cyrillic: Стефан Вицо; born 28 February 1995) is a Montenegrin footballer who plays for second-tier club Bokelj.

== Club career ==
Vico was playing in the youth teams of FK Rad until the season 2012 – 2013, when he debuted for the first team in the Serbian SuperLiga.

Born in Herceg Novi, Montenegro, Vico played for the Montenegrin U-16 in 2010; however, after debuting for the first team of Rad, he was included in the Serbian U-18 and U-19 teams in 2013. The lack of calls for the Serbian youth national teams since then made Vico switch once more and accept a call for the Montenegrgro U-21 team in March 2016.

On 3 April 2019, Vico joined Næstved BK in the Danish 1st Division. He left the club in the summer of 2020 after they were relegated to the Danish 2nd Division.

On 26 December 2020, he signed a three-year contract with Serbian club Javor Ivanjica.

== International career ==
In May 2016, he was part of Montenegro's "B" team.

== Career statistics ==
As of 14 December 2016

Club	Season	League		Cup		Continental		Total	
Club	Season	Apps	Goals	Apps	Goals	Apps	Goals	Apps	Goals
Rad	2012–13	2	0	0	0	0	0	2	0
Rad	2013–14	0	0	0	0	0	0	0	0
Rad	2014–15	5	0	0	0	0	0	5	0
Rad	2015–16	12	0	1	0	0	0	13	0
Rad	2016–17	14	0	2	0	0	0	16	0
Rad	Total	33	0	3	0	0	0	36	0
