= Zoran Vuksanović =

Montenegrin footballer

Personal information
- Full name: Zoran Vuksanović
- Date of birth: 5 March 1972 (age 54)
- Place of birth: Dubrovnik, SFR Yugoslavia
- Height: 1.82 m (6 ft 0 in)
- Position: Midfielder

Youth career
- Arsenal Tivat

Senior career*
Years	Team	Apps	(Gls)
1990–1996	Vrbas	99	(9)
1996–1997	Radnički Niš	10	(0)
1997–2003	Hajduk Kula	120	(3)
Total		229	(12)
- * Club domestic league appearances and goals

Zoran Vuksanović (Serbian Cyrillic: Зоран Вуксановић; born 5 March 1972) is a Montenegrin retired footballer who played as a midfielder.

== Club career ==
Born in Tivat, Vuksanović started out at local club Arsenal. He later spent six seasons with Vrbas between 1990 and 1996. After playing one season for Radnički Niš, Vuksanović switched to Hajduk Kula. He made over 100 appearances in the First League of Serbia and Montenegro over the next six seasons. In March 2002, Vuksanović received a six-month ban by the Yugoslav FA for assaulting an assistant referee during a league match.
