= Medo Juković =

Montenegrin football player (born 2004)

Personal information
- Date of birth: 31 December 2004 (age 21)
- Place of birth: Rožaje, Serbia and Montenegro
- Height: 1.78 m (5 ft 10 in)
- Positions: Winger; attacking midfielder

Team information
- Current team: FK Sutjeska Nikšić
- Number: 88

Youth career
- –2023: FK Budućnost Podgorica
- 2023–2023: FK Novi Pazar

Senior career*
Years	Team	Apps	(Gls)
2023–2024	FK Ibar	4	(1)
2024–2025	FK Jedinstvo	29	(4)
2025–	FK Sutjeska Nikšić	31	(4)

International career^{‡}
2021–2021	Montenegro U17	3	(0)
2021–2024	Montenegro U18	2	(1)
2024–2024	Montenegro U20	1	(1)
2024–	Montenegro U21	9	(1)
- * Club domestic league appearances and goals as of 17 June 2026 ‡ National team caps and goals as of 18 November 2025

Medo Juković (born 31 December 2004) is a professional association football player from Montenegro who plays for Montenegrin team FK Sutjeska Nikšić in the Montenegrin First League.

== Club career ==
=== Youth and early career ===
Medo Juković started his football career in the youth team of FK Buducnost Podgorica in the capital of his home country Montenegro. He would play there until he reached the U–18 level before transferring to the youth team of Novi Pazar in Serbia, for whom he played for until 2023.

In 2023 he would sign for FK Ibar on a free. He would go on to score 1 goal which according to Vijesti was against FK Podgorica in a 3–1 win on 30 October 2024, however according to news outlet "Radio Rožaje" he would also score a hattrick in a 8–0 win against Brskovo in a Montenegrin Third League match (6 May 2024), a goal in a 5–0 win against Gusinje (14 April 2024) and a goal against Borac in a 3–0 win (24 September 2023).

=== FK Jedinstvo ===
In 2024 Juković would sign for Montenegrin club FK Jedinstvo Bijelo Polje. He would go on to play for them the entire season, scoring 4 goals in 29 appearances. According to Montenegrin sports outlet RTCG, one of these 4 goals would be scored against Arsenal Tivat in the 18th minute in a 3–2 comeback. Additionally, "Portal Analitika" another one of those 4 goals would come against Bokelj in the 9th minute in a 2–1 victory.

=== Sutjeska Nikšić ===
In summer of 2025, Medo Juković would sign for Montenegrin team FK Sutjeska Nikšić. He would make his debut in the UEFA Conference League first qualifying round against Belarusian team FC Dynamo Brest on 10 July. He would come on as a substitute in the 77th minute for Igor Pajović, however in the 94th minute he would score an own goal which cost Sutjeska the 2–1 away defeat. In the second game, Medo would come off the bench again and his team would win 2–0, advancing to the next round where they would play Beitar Jerusalem F.C., which Sutjeska would lose 7–3 on aggregate. Jukovic would go on to make his first appearance for Sutjeska in the Montenegrin league against FK Mornar which ended in a 3–0 win. Medos first ever goal for Sutjeska would come against Lovćen in a Montenegrin Cup match on 22 October 2025 where he scored on the 45th minute with 2 minutes of additional time. A month later Medo would score his first goal for Sutjeska in the Montenegrin First League, where he scored against Dečić on the 86th minute in a match ending 3–1 in favour of Sutjeska.

== National career ==
=== Montenegro U17 ===
Medo would begin his national career for Montenegro U–17. His national debut was against North Macedonia on 4 April 2021, the match ended in 0–0. He would later go on to make 2 more appearances for Montenegro U17, one in a 2–1 win against North Macedonia and the other one in a 2–0 defeat against Bosnia.

=== Montenegro U18 ===
On 23 November 2021 Medo would make his first appearance for the Montenegro U18. He made his debut against Hungary in a 1–0 defeat. 2 days later Medo would score his first goal in his national career against Hungary in a 2–1 defeat.

=== Montenegro U20 ===
3 years later Medo would return to international football, this time playing for Montenegro U20. He only made 1 appearance for the Montenegro U20 on 19 November 2024, but in that game he managed to get a goal in a friendly against Slovakia.

=== Montenegro U21 ===
Medo would make his Montenegro U21 debut against Romania in a 6–2 defeat on 11 October 2024, 5 months later he would return to the Montenegro U21 this time against Bosnia in a 3–2 friendly win. He would appear on 2 more friendlies against Turkey and Azerbaijan where both games ended in draws. Medo would play his first competitive game of 2025 against Italy on 5 September 2025, the game ended in a 2–1 defeat where he came on in the 83rd minute and got a yellow card. 4 days later he would appear again but this time against Sweden, Montenegro won that match 2–0 and Medo would get 2 assists that game. Medo's first goal for the Montenegro U21 national team came against North Macedonia during a U21 European Championship qualifying round where he scored in the 68th minute after coming on as a substitute for Lazar Knežević in the 58th minute, Montenegro ended up winning that game 3–2. As of 18 November 2025 Medo is playing for the Montenegro U21.

== Awards ==
On 29 December 2025, Medo received his first individual award after being named the best athlete in his hometown of Rožaje, following his successful performances with Jedinstvo and Sutjeska.
