= Irfan Šahman =

Montenegrin footballer

Personal information
- Full name: Irfan Šahman
- Date of birth: 5 October 1993 (age 33)
- Place of birth: Bijelo Polje, Yugoslavia
- Position: Midfielder

Team information
- Current team: Arsenal Tivat
- Number: 8

Youth career
- –2012: Jedinstvo BP
- 2012–2015: Parma

Senior career*
Years	Team	Apps	(Gls)
2012–2013	→ Crotone (loan)	0	(0)
2014	→ Padova (loan)	0	(0)
2014	Parma	0	(0)
2015–2016	Jedinstvo BP	17	(2)
2016–2022	Iskra Danilovgrad	168	(9)
2022–2023	Rudar Pljevlja	35	(1)
2023–	Arsenal Tivat	106	(1)
- * Club domestic league appearances and goals as of 1 June 2025

Irfan Šahman (born 5 October 1993) is a Montenegrin professional footballer who plays for Arsenal Tivat.

In 2012 from local Jedinstvo BP he made a transfer in Parma. During his Italian spell, Šahman was loaned out to Crotone and Padova. After Italy, he returned to Montenegro and signed for Jedinstvo BP. After six seasons in Iskra Danilovgrad and one in Rudar Pljevlja Šahman transferred to current club, Arsenal Tivat.
