= Petar Ražnatović =

Montenegrin footballer

Personal information
- Full name: Petar Ražnatović
- Date of birth: 7 August 2008 (age 18)
- Place of birth: Kotor, Montenegro
- Position: Attacking midfielder

Team information
- Current team: FK Arsenal Tivat
- Number: 10

Youth career
- 2018–2024: FK Arsenal Tivat

Senior career*
Years	Team	Apps	(Gls)
2024–	FK Arsenal Tivat	36	(5)

International career^{‡}
2022	Montenegro U15	8	(1)
2023	Montenegro U16	10	(0)
2024	Montenegro U17	19	(0)
2025–	Montenegro U18	2	(0)
2025–	Montenegro U19	10	(1)
- * Club domestic league appearances and goals as of 5 April 2026 ‡ National team caps and goals as of 5 April 2026

Petar Ražnatović (born 7 August 2008) is a professional footballer who plays as an attacking midfielder for FK Arsenal Tivat where he debuted in first team at the age of 16.

At international level, he is currently a member of Montenegro U19 squad. Before that, he represented Montenegro on U15, U16, U17 and U18 levels.

In Montenegro, he is considered as one of the major football talents.
