= Nemanja Bojanić =

Montenegrin footballer (born 2006)

Personal information
- Date of birth: 4 February 2006 (age 20)
- Place of birth: Kotor, Serbia and Montenegro
- Position: Midfielder

Team information
- Current team: Arsenal Tivat
- Number: 18

Youth career
- -2022: Arsenal Tivat
- 2022-2023: AD Nervión
- 2023-2024: UD Tomares
- 2024-2025: CD Mosquito

Senior career*
Years	Team	Apps	(Gls)
2022-2023	Arsenal Tivat	8	(0)
2023-2024	UD Tomares	1	(0)
2025-	Arsenal Tivat	20	(1)

International career
2022	Montenegro U17	1	(0)
- * Club domestic league appearances and goals

Nemanja Bojanić (Cyrillic: Немања Бојанић, born 4 February 2006) is a Montenegrin footballer who plays as a midfielder for Arsenal Tivat.

He made a professional debut in season 2022-23 wearing Arsenal Tivat jersey. From 2023 to 2025, he played for Spanish youth clubs AD Nervión, UD Tomares where he also made a senior debut and CD Mosquito. At summer of 2025, he returned to Arsenal Tivat.

On international level, he made one cap for Montenegro U17 in 2022.
