= Gojko Petović =

Montenegrin footballer (born 2003)

Personal information
- Date of birth: 23 December 2003 (age 22)
- Place of birth: Kotor, Serbia and Montenegro
- Position: Defender

Team information
- Current team: Arsenal Tivat
- Number: 5

Youth career
- -2015: Arsenal Tivat
- 2015-2021: Grbalj

Senior career*
Years	Team	Apps	(Gls)
2021-2023	Grbalj	32	(0)
2024	Bačka	12	(0)
2024	→ Mladost GAT (loan)	0	(0)
2024-	Arsenal Tivat	55	(0)
- * Club domestic league appearances and goals

Gojko Petović (Cyrillic: Гојко Петовић, born 23 December 2003) is a Montenegrin footballer who plays as a defender for Arsenal Tivat.

He started his senior career in 2021 at Grbalj and after two years he transferred to Bačka but quickly gets loaned to Mladost GAT. Since summer of 2024, he is member of Arsenal Tivat.
