= Marko Čavor =

Montenegrin footballer

Personal information
- Full name: Marko Čavor
- Date of birth: 5 July 1999 (age 27)
- Place of birth: Kotor, FR Yugoslavia
- Position: Left-back

Team information
- Current team: Bokelj
- Number: 29

Youth career
- 2010–2017: Bokelj

Senior career*
| Years | Team | Apps | (Gls) |
| 2017–2020 | Bokelj | 67 | (2) |
| 2020–2021 | Podgorica | 12 | (0) |
| 2021–2022 | Rudar Pljevlja | 33 | (0) |
| 2022–2024 | Arsenal Tivat | 55 | (0) |
| 2024– | Bokelj | 65 | (4) |
- * Club domestic league appearances and goals as of 25 May 2026

Marko Čavor (born 5 July 1999) is a Montenegrin professional footballer who plays for Bokelj. Earlier in career, he played for Bokelj, Podgorica, Rudar Pljevlja and Arsenal Tivat.

== Honours ==
Arsenal Tivat

- Montenegrin Cup (runner-up): 2022–23
