= 2026–27 UEFA Conference League =

2026–27 season of Europe's third-tier club football tournament

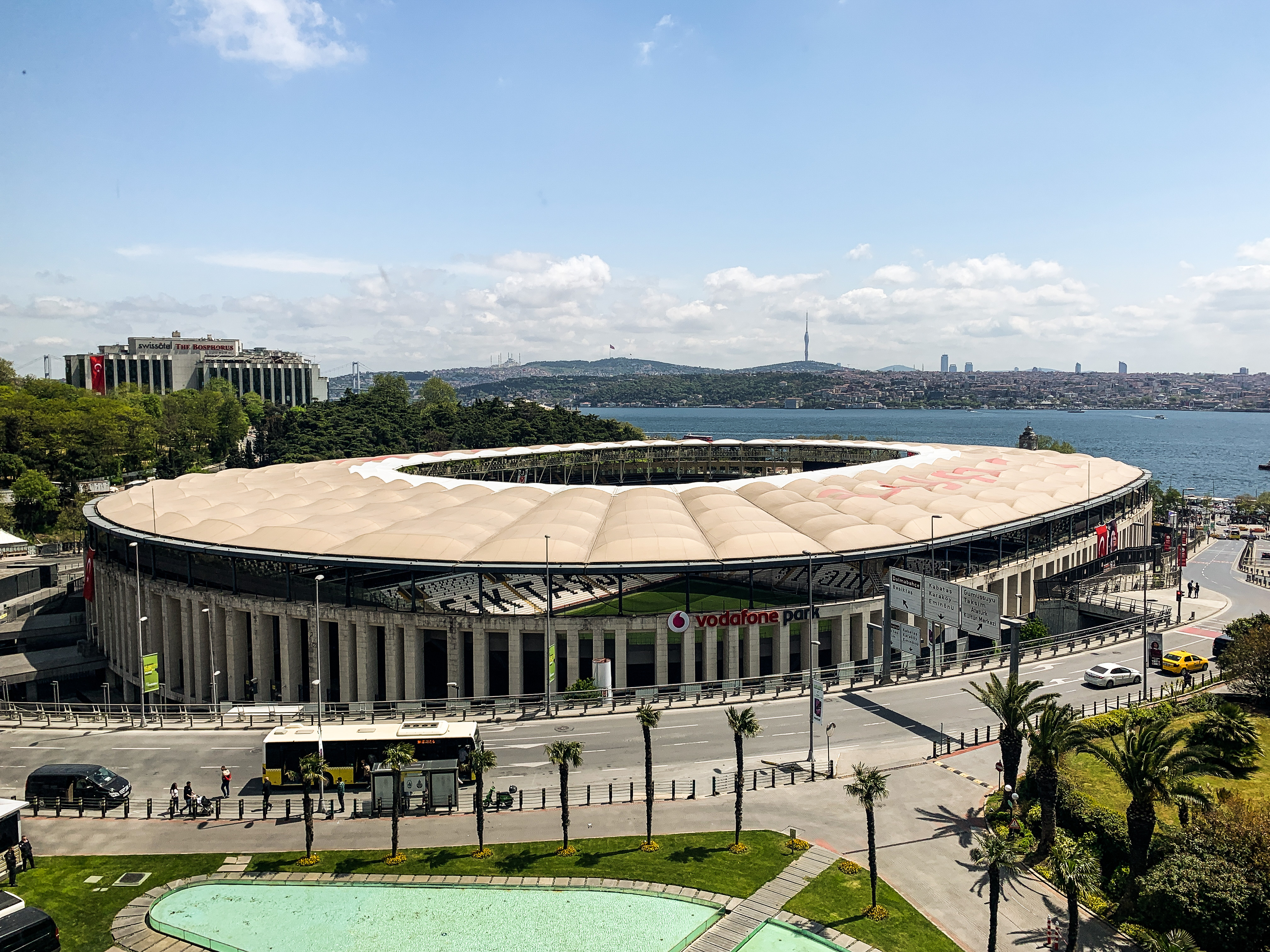
- The Beşiktaş Stadium in Istanbul will host the final

Tournament details
- Dates: Qualifying: 7 July – 27 August 2026; Competition proper: 15 October 2026 – 2 June 2027
- Teams: Competition proper: 24+12; Total: 111+54 (from 54 associations)

Tournament statistics
- Matches played: 54
- Goals scored: 149 (2.76 per match)
- Attendance: 676,790 (12,533 per match)
- Top scorer(s): Six players 3 goals each
- All statistics correct as of 5 November 2026.

The 2026–27 UEFA Conference League is the sixth season of the UEFA Conference League, Europe's tertiary club football tournament organised by UEFA.

The winners of the tournament will automatically qualify for the 2027–28 UEFA Europa League league phase, unless they qualify for the 2027–28 UEFA Champions League or Europa League through their league performance.

As the reigning champions, Crystal Palace automatically qualified for the Europa League league phase, and are unable to defend their title as the new format does not allow clubs to transfer from the Europa League into the Conference League from the league phase onwards.

== Association team allocation ==
A total of 165 teams from 54 of the 55 UEFA member associations are participating in the 2026–27 UEFA Conference League. The association ranking based on the UEFA association coefficients was used to determine the number of participating teams for each association:

- Associations 1–12 each have one team.
- Associations 13–33 and 51–55 (except Russia) each have two teams.
- Associations 34–50 each have three teams (except Liechtenstein, which has one).
- 15 teams eliminated from the 2026–27 UEFA Champions League and 41 teams eliminated from the 2026–27 UEFA Europa League were transferred to the Conference League.

=== Association ranking ===
For the 2026–27 UEFA Conference League, the associations were allocated places according to their 2025 UEFA association coefficients, which took into account their performance in European competitions from 2020–21 to 2024–25.

Apart from the allocation based on the association coefficients, associations could have additional teams participating in the Conference League, as noted below:

- (UCL) – Additional teams transferred from the UEFA Champions League
- (UEL) – Additional/vacated teams transferred from/to the UEFA Europa League

Association ranking for 2026–27 UEFA Conference League

Rank	Association	Coeff.	Teams	Notes
1	England	115.196	1	
2	Italy	97.231	1	
3	Spain	94.453	1	
4	Germany	86.331	1	
5	France	73.093	1	
6	Netherlands	67.150	1	+1 (UEL)
7	Portugal	62.266	1	
8	Belgium	56.850	1	+1 (UEL)
9	Czech Republic	44.100	1	+1 (UEL)
10	Turkey	43.900	1	+1 (UEL)
11	Norway	39.687	1	+1 (UEL)
12	Greece	39.312	1	+1 (UEL)
13	Austria	36.450	2	
14	Scotland	35.550	2	+2 (UEL)
15	Poland	35.000	2	+1 (UEL)
16	Denmark	33.981	2	+2 (UEL)
17	Switzerland	33.625	2	+2 (UEL)
18	Israel	31.625	2	+1 (UEL)
19	Cyprus	27.537	2	+1 (UEL)

Rank	Association	Coeff.	Teams	Notes
20	Sweden	27.125	2	+2 (UEL)
21	Croatia	27.025	2	+1 (UEL)
22	Serbia	25.500	2	+2 (UEL)
23	Ukraine	24.400	2	+1 (UEL)
24	Hungary	24.000	2	+1 (UCL)
25	Romania	23.250	2	+2 (UEL)
26	Russia	22.632	0	
27	Slovakia	21.250	2	+1 (UEL)
28	Slovenia	20.343	2	+1 (UEL)
29	Bulgaria	19.875	2	+1 (UEL)
30	Azerbaijan	19.625	2	+1 (UEL)
31	Republic of Ireland	14.968	2	+2 (UEL)
32	Moldova	14.500	2	+1 (UCL) +1 (UEL)
33	Iceland	13.520	2	+2 (UEL)
34	Bosnia and Herzegovina	13.031	3	+1 (UCL)
35	Armenia	12.250	3	
36	Latvia	12.250	3	+1 (UCL)
37	Kosovo	12.041	3	+1 (UCL)
38	Finland	11.750	3	+1 (UEL)

Rank	Association	Coeff.	Teams	Notes
39	Kazakhstan	11.125	3	+1 (UEL)
40	Faroe Islands	10.750	3	+1 (UEL)
41	Malta	8.500	3	+1 (UCL)
42	Northern Ireland	8.333	3	+1 (UEL)
43	Lithuania	8.250	3	+1 (UEL)
44	Liechtenstein	8.000	1	
45	Estonia	7.957	3	+1 (UCL)
46	Albania	7.875	3	+1 (UEL)
47	Montenegro	7.208	3	+1 (UCL)
48	Luxembourg	6.875	3	+1 (UCL)
49	Wales	6.791	3	+1 (UCL)
50	Georgia	6.625	3	+1 (UEL)
51	North Macedonia	6.166	2	+1 (UCL)
52	Belarus	6.000	2	+1 (UCL)
53	Andorra	5.498	2	+1 (UCL)
54	Gibraltar	5.457	2	+1 (UEL)
55	San Marino	2.498	2	+1 (UCL)

=== Distribution ===
The following is the access list for this season.

		Teams entering in this round	Teams advancing from previous round	Teams transferred from Champions League	Teams transferred from Europa League
First qualifying round (52 teams)		11 domestic cup winners from associations 45–55; 21 domestic league runners-up from associations 34–55 (except Liechtenstein); 20 domestic league third-placed teams from associations 30–50 (except Liechtenstein)			
Second qualifying round (98 teams)	Champions Path (12 teams)			12 teams eliminated from Champions League first qualifying round	
Second qualifying round (98 teams)	League Path (86 teams)	11 domestic cup winners from associations 34–44; 17 domestic league runners-up from associations 16–33 (except Russia); 16 domestic league third-placed teams from associations 13–29 (except Russia; 9 domestic league fourth-placed teams from associations 7–15; 1 domestic league fifth-placed team from association 6	26 winners from the first qualifying round		6 teams eliminated from Europa League first qualifying round
Third qualifying round (60 teams)	Champions Path (8 teams)		6 winners from the second qualifying round (Champions Path)	2 teams eliminated from Champions League first qualifying round	
Third qualifying round (60 teams)	League Path (52 teams)		43 winners from the second qualifying round (League Path)		9 teams eliminated from Europa League second qualifying round
Play-off round (48 teams)	Champions Path (10 teams)		4 winners from the third qualifying round (Champions Path)		6 teams eliminated from Europa League third qualifying round (Champions Path)
Play-off round (48 teams)	League Path (38 teams)	5 domestic league sixth-placed teams from associations 1–5 (EFL Cup winners for England)	26 winners from the third qualifying round (League Path)		7 teams eliminated from Europa League third qualifying round (League Path)
League phase (36 teams)			5 winners from the play-off round (Champions Path); 19 winners from the play-off round (League Path)		12 teams eliminated from Europa League play-off round
Knockout phase play-offs (16 teams)			16 teams ranked 9–24 from the league phase		
Round of 16 (16 teams)			8 teams ranked 1–8 from the league phase; 8 winners from the knockout phase play-offs		

The information here reflects the ongoing suspension of Russia from European football, and so the following changes to the default access list were made:

- The cup winners of associations 38 to 44 (Finland, Kazakhstan, the Faroe Islands, Malta, Northern Ireland, Lithuania, and Liechtenstein) entered the second qualifying round instead of the first qualifying round.
- As a result of corresponding changes to the Champions League access list, one fewer loser from the Champions League first qualifying round was transferred to the Conference League second qualifying round (Champions Path), so one transferred team received a bye to the third qualifying round (Champions Path).

As the Champions League title holders qualified for the Champions League via their domestic league's standard berth allocation, the following changes to the default access list were made:

- As a result of corresponding changes to the Champions League access list, one fewer loser from the Champions League first qualifying round (two fewer in total) was transferred to the Conference League second qualifying round (Champions Path), so one transferred team (two in total) received a bye to the third qualifying round (Champions Path).

=== Teams ===
The labels in the parentheses show how each team qualified for the place of its starting round:

- CW: Domestic cup winners
- 2nd, 3rd, 4th, 5th, 6th, etc.: League position of the previous season
- PW: End-of-season Conference League play-offs winners
- CL: Transferred from the Champions League
  - Q1: Losers from the first qualifying round
- EL: Transferred from the Europa League
  - PO: Losers from the play-off round
  - CH/MP Q3: Losers from the third qualifying round (Champions/Main Path)
  - Q2: Losers from the second qualifying round
  - Q1: Losers from the first qualifying round

The second qualifying round, third qualifying round and play-off round were divided into Champions Path (CH) and Main Path (MP).

Qualified teams for 2026–27 UEFA Conference League
Entry round		Teams			
League phase		(Belgium) Sint-Truiden (EL PO)	(Turkey) Trabzonspor (EL PO)	(Denmark) AGF (EL PO)	(Switzerland) Thun (EL PO)
League phase		(Sweden) Mjällby AIF (EL PO)	(Serbia) Red Star Belgrade (EL PO)	(Romania) Universitatea Craiova (EL PO)	(Bulgaria) CSKA Sofia (EL PO)
League phase		(Kazakhstan) Kairat (EL PO)	(Lithuania) Kauno Žalgiris (EL PO)	(Albania) Egnatia (EL PO)	(Georgia (country)) Iberia 1999 (EL PO)
Play-off round	CH	(Republic of Ireland) Shamrock Rovers (EL CH Q3)	(Iceland) Víkingur Reykjavík (EL CH Q3)	(Finland) KuPS (EL CH Q3)	(Faroe Islands) KÍ (EL CH Q3)
Play-off round	CH	(Northern Ireland) Larne (EL CH Q3)	(Gibraltar) Lincoln Red Imps (EL CH Q3)		
Play-off round	MP	(England) Brighton & Hove Albion (8th)	(Italy) Atalanta (7th)	(Spain) Getafe (7th)	(Germany) SC Freiburg (7th)
Play-off round	MP	(France) Monaco (7th)	(Czech Republic) Hradec Králové (EL MP Q3)	(Greece) PAOK (EL MP Q3)	(Scotland) Heart of Midlothian (EL MP Q3)
Play-off round	MP	(Scotland) Rangers (EL MP Q3)	(Poland) Górnik Zabrze (EL MP Q3)	(Israel) Maccabi Tel Aviv (EL MP Q3)	(Cyprus) Pafos (EL MP Q3)
Third qualifying round	CH	(Andorra) Inter Club d'Escaldes (CL Q1)	(San Marino) Tre Fiori (CL Q1)		
Third qualifying round	MP	(Netherlands) Twente (EL Q2)	(Norway) Tromsø (EL Q2)	(Denmark) Midtjylland (EL Q2)	(Switzerland) St. Gallen (EL Q2)
Third qualifying round	MP	(Sweden) Hammarby IF (EL Q2)	(Croatia) Hajduk Split (EL Q2)	(Ukraine) Dynamo Kyiv (EL Q2)	(Azerbaijan) Qarabağ (EL Q2)
Third qualifying round	MP	(Moldova) Sheriff Tiraspol (EL Q2)			
Second qualifying round	CH	(Hungary) ETO Győr (CL Q1)	(Moldova) Petrocub Hîncești (CL Q1)	(Bosnia and Herzegovina) Borac Banja Luka (CL Q1)	(Latvia) Riga (CL Q1)
Second qualifying round	CH	(Kosovo) Drita (CL Q1)	(Malta) Floriana (CL Q1)	(Estonia) Flora (CL Q1)	(Montenegro) Sutjeska (CL Q1)
Second qualifying round	CH	(Luxembourg) Atert Bissen (CL Q1)	(Wales) The New Saints (CL Q1)	(North Macedonia) Vardar (CL Q1)	(Belarus) ML Vitebsk (CL Q1)
Second qualifying round	MP	(Serbia) Vojvodina (EL Q1)	(Romania) Universitatea Cluj (EL Q1)	(Slovakia) Žilina (EL Q1)	(Slovenia) Aluminij (EL Q1)
Second qualifying round	MP	(Republic of Ireland) Derry City (EL Q1)	(Iceland) Vestri (EL Q1)	(Netherlands) Ajax (PW)	(Portugal) Braga (4th)
Second qualifying round	MP	(Belgium) Gent (PW)	(Czech Republic) Jablonec (5th)	(Turkey) İstanbul Başakşehir (5th)	(Norway) Brann (4th)
Second qualifying round	MP	(Greece) Panathinaikos (4th)	Austria Wien (4th)	(Austria) Rapid Wien (PW)	(Scotland) Motherwell (4th)
Second qualifying round	MP	(Scotland) Hibernian (5th)	(Poland) Raków Częstochowa (4th)	(Poland) GKS Katowice (5th)	(Denmark) Nordsjælland (3rd)
Second qualifying round	MP	(Denmark) Copenhagen (PW)	(Switzerland) Lugano (3rd)	(Switzerland) Sion (4th)	(Israel) Beitar Jerusalem (2nd)
Second qualifying round	MP	(Israel) Hapoel Tel Aviv (4th)	(Cyprus) AEK Larnaca (2nd)	(Cyprus) Apollon Limassol (3rd)	(Sweden) GAIS (3rd)
Second qualifying round	MP	(Sweden) IFK Göteborg (4th)	(Croatia) Varaždin (3rd)	(Croatia) Rijeka (4th)	(Serbia) Partizan (3rd)
Second qualifying round	MP	(Serbia) Železničar Pančevo (4th)	(Ukraine) LNZ Cherkasy (2nd)	(Ukraine) Polissya Zhytomyr (3rd)	(Hungary) Paks (3rd)
Second qualifying round	MP	(Hungary) Debrecen (4th)	(Romania) CFR Cluj (3rd)	(Romania) FCSB (PW)	(Slovakia) DAC Dunajská Streda (2nd)
Second qualifying round	MP	(Slovakia) Spartak Trnava (3rd)	(Slovenia) Koper (2nd)	(Slovenia) Bravo (3rd)	(Bulgaria) CSKA 1948 (2nd)
Second qualifying round	MP	(Bulgaria) Ludogorets Razgrad (PW)	(Azerbaijan) Neftçi (4th)	(Republic of Ireland) Shelbourne (3rd)	(Moldova) Zimbru Chișinău (3rd)
Second qualifying round	MP	(Iceland) Valur (2nd)	(Bosnia and Herzegovina) Zrinjski Mostar (CW)	(Armenia) Noah (CW)	(Latvia) Auda (CW)
Second qualifying round	MP	(Kosovo) Dukagjini (CW)	(Finland) HJK (CW)	(Kazakhstan) Tobol (CW)	(Faroe Islands) HB (2nd)
Second qualifying round	MP	(Malta) Valletta (CW)	(Northern Ireland) Coleraine (CW)	(Lithuania) Panevėžys (CW)	(Liechtenstein) Vaduz (CW)
First qualifying round	MP	(Azerbaijan) Zira (5th)	(Republic of Ireland) Bohemians (4th)	(Moldova) Milsami Orhei (4th)	(Iceland) Stjarnan (3rd)
First qualifying round	MP	(Bosnia and Herzegovina) Sarajevo (3rd)	(Bosnia and Herzegovina) Velež Mostar (4th)	(Armenia) Pyunik (3rd)	(Armenia) Alashkert (4th)
First qualifying round	MP	(Latvia) RFS (2nd)	(Latvia) Liepāja (3rd)	(Kosovo) Malisheva (2nd)	(Kosovo) Ballkani (3rd)
First qualifying round	MP	(Finland) Inter Turku (2nd)	(Finland) Ilves (3rd)	(Kazakhstan) Astana (2nd)	(Kazakhstan) Yelimay (4th)
First qualifying round	MP	(Faroe Islands) NSÍ (3rd)	(Faroe Islands) Víkingur Gøta (4th)	(Malta) Marsaxlokk (2nd)	(Malta) Hamrun Spartans (3rd)
First qualifying round	MP	(Northern Ireland) Glentoran (3rd)	(Northern Ireland) Linfield (PW)	(Lithuania) Hegelmann (2nd)	(Lithuania) Žalgiris (3rd)
First qualifying round	MP	(Estonia) FCI Levadia (2nd)	(Estonia) Nõmme Kalju (3rd)	(Estonia) Paide Linnameeskond (4th)	(Albania) Dinamo City (CW)
First qualifying round	MP	(Albania) Elbasani (2nd)	(Albania) Vllaznia (3rd)	(Montenegro) Mornar (CW)	(Montenegro) Petrovac (3rd)
First qualifying round	MP	(Montenegro) Dečić (4th)	(Luxembourg) Differdange 03 (CW)	(Luxembourg) Mondorf-les-Bains (3rd)	(Luxembourg) UNA Strassen (4th)
First qualifying round	MP	(Wales) Caernarfon Town (CW)	(Wales) Connah's Quay Nomads (2nd)	(Wales) Penybont (PW)	(Georgia (country)) Dila Gori (CW)
First qualifying round	MP	(Georgia (country)) Torpedo Kutaisi (3rd)	(Georgia (country)) Dinamo Tbilisi (4th)	(North Macedonia) Sileks (CW)	(North Macedonia) Shkëndija (2nd)
First qualifying round	MP	(Belarus) BATE Borisov (CW)	(Belarus) Dinamo Minsk (2nd)	(Andorra) Atlètic Club d'Escaldes (CW)	(Andorra) FC Santa Coloma (4th)
First qualifying round	MP	(Gibraltar) St Joseph's (2nd)	(Gibraltar) Europa (3rd)	(San Marino) La Fiorita (CW)	(San Marino) Virtus (PW)

Notes

1. Champions League (UCL Q1): Two of the Champions League first qualifying round losers were drawn to receive byes to the third qualifying round (Champions Path), as two fewer losers transferred to the second qualifying round (Champions Path), due to Champions League league phase berths vacated following the Champions League title holders qualifying via league position and the suspension of Russia from the 2026–27 European season.
2. Andorra (AND): UE Santa Coloma qualified as the second-placed team of the 2025–26 Primera Divisió for the first qualifying round but failed to obtain a UEFA licence. The berth passed on to the third-placed team, Rànger's, who also failed to obtain a UEFA licence. The berth passed on to fourth-placed team, FC Santa Coloma.
3. Azerbaijan (AZE): Turan Tovuz finished third in 2025–26 Azerbaijan Premier League and qualified for the second qualifying round. UEFA removed the club because of past match-fixing by players. As a result, their place in the competition was passed on to the fourth-placed team, Neftçi and subsequently to the fifth-placed team, Zira.
4. Czech Republic (CZE): Hradec Králové originally qualified for the second qualifying round, but were promoted to the Europa League after Karviná's disqualification for their involvement in a match-fixing scandal.
5. Liechtenstein (LIE): The seven teams affiliated with the Liechtenstein Football Association (LFV) all played in the Swiss football league system. The only competition organised by the LFV was the Liechtenstein Football Cup – the winners of which qualified for the UEFA Conference League for this season.
6. Russia (RUS): On 28 February 2022, Russian football clubs and national teams were suspended from FIFA and UEFA competitions due to the Russian invasion of Ukraine. The tables reflect Russia's ongoing suspension from UEFA competitions.

== Schedule ==
Schedule for 2026–27 UEFA Conference League
Phase	Round	Draw date	First leg	Second leg
Qualifying	First qualifying round	16 June 2026	9 July 2026	16 July 2026
Qualifying	Second qualifying round	17 June 2026	23 July 2026	30 July 2026
Qualifying	Third qualifying round	20 July 2026	6 August 2026	13 August 2026
Play-offs	Play-off round	3 August 2026	20 August 2026	27 August 2026
League phase	Matchday 1	28 August 2026	15 October 2026	
League phase	Matchday 2	28 August 2026	22 October 2026	
League phase	Matchday 3	28 August 2026	5 November 2026	
League phase	Matchday 4	28 August 2026	26 November 2026	
League phase	Matchday 5	28 August 2026	10 December 2026	
League phase	Matchday 6	28 August 2026	17 December 2026	
Knockout phase	Knockout phase play-offs	15 January 2027	18 February 2027	25 February 2027
Knockout phase	Round of 16	26 February 2027	11 March 2027	18 March 2027
Knockout phase	Quarter-finals	—N/a	8 April 2027	15 April 2027
Knockout phase	Semi-finals	—N/a	29 April 2027	6 May 2027
Knockout phase	Final	—N/a	2 June 2027 at Beşiktaş Stadium, Istanbul	

== Qualifying rounds ==
=== First qualifying round ===
The draw for the first qualifying round was held on 16 June 2026. The first legs were played on 7, 8 and 9 July, and the second legs were played on 14, 15 and 16 July 2026.

The winners of the ties advanced to the second qualifying round.

First qualifying round
Team 1	Agg.	Team 2	1st leg	2nd leg
Velež Mostar (Bosnia and Herzegovina)	2–1	(Moldova) Milsami Orhei	1–1	1–0
Bohemians (Republic of Ireland)	2–0	(Gibraltar) St Joseph's	2–0	0–0
Dinamo City (Albania)	4–2	(Kazakhstan) Astana	0–1	4–1 (a.e.t.)
Connah's Quay Nomads (Wales)	2–3	(Kosovo) Ballkani	0–0	2–3
Zira (Azerbaijan)	6–0	(Georgia (country)) Torpedo Kutaisi	3–0	3–0
Differdange 03 (Luxembourg)	1–3	(Finland) Ilves	0–0	1–3
Dinamo Minsk (Belarus)	1–1 (6–5 p)	(North Macedonia) Sileks	0–1	1–0 (a.e.t.)
Liepāja (Latvia)	3–1 (Note: Order of legs reversed after original draw.)	(Montenegro) Dečić	1–0	2–1
Elbasani (Albania)	1–1 (4–5 p)	(Belarus) BATE Borisov	1–1	0–0 (a.e.t.)
Glentoran (Northern Ireland)	1–4	(Latvia) RFS	1–2	0–2
Atlètic Club d'Escaldes (Andorra)	4–2	(Montenegro) Mornar	2–1	2–1
Mondorf-les-Bains (Luxembourg)	2–3	(Georgia (country)) Dinamo Tbilisi	1–2	1–1 (a.e.t.)
Petrovac (Montenegro)	2–5	(Lithuania) Žalgiris	1–3	1–2
Caernarfon Town (Wales)	0–10	(Estonia) FCI Levadia	0–5	0–5
Marsaxlokk (Malta)	0–4	(Armenia) Pyunik	0–3	0–1
Hegelmann (Lithuania)	1–4	(Estonia) Paide Linnameeskond	1–1	0–3
Alashkert (Armenia)	3–3 (6–5 p)	(Kazakhstan) Yelimay	1–1	2–2 (a.e.t.)
Stjarnan (Iceland)	5–3	(Faroe Islands) Víkingur	3–1	2–2
Dila Gori (Georgia (country))	3–2	(San Marino) Virtus	3–1	0–1
Sarajevo (Bosnia and Herzegovina)	2–3	(Finland) Inter Turku	1–1	1–2
Europa (Gibraltar)	0–6	(North Macedonia) Shkëndija	0–5	0–1
Nõmme Kalju (Estonia)	3–2	(Northern Ireland) Linfield	1–0	2–2
Penybont (Wales)	0–4	(Andorra) FC Santa Coloma	0–1	0–3
NSÍ (Faroe Islands)	3–2	(Malta) Hamrun Spartans	1–1	2–1
UNA Strassen (Luxembourg)	3–0	(San Marino) La Fiorita	1–0	2–0
Vllaznia (Albania)	2–6	(Kosovo) Malisheva	2–1	0–5

=== Second qualifying round ===
The draw for the second qualifying round was held on 17 June 2026. The first legs were played on 21, 22 and 23 July, and the second legs were played on 28, 29 and 30 July 2026.

The winners of the ties advanced to the third qualifying round.

Second qualifying round
Team 1	Agg.	Team 2	1st leg	2nd leg
Champions Path
Tre Fiori (San Marino)	Bye	N/A	—	—
Inter Club d'Escaldes (Andorra)	Bye	N/A	—	—
Borac Banja Luka (Bosnia and Herzegovina)	6–3	(Moldova) Petrocub Hîncești	3–0	3–3
Atert Bissen (Luxembourg)	3–7	(Hungary) ETO Győr	2–6	1–1
ML Vitebsk (Belarus)	5–1	(Montenegro) Sutjeska	3–0	2–1
Flora (Estonia)	1–1 (4–2 p)	(Wales) The New Saints	1–0	0–1 (a.e.t.)
Floriana (Malta)	2–3	(Kosovo) Drita	1–1	1–2 (a.e.t.)
Vardar (North Macedonia)	4–8	(Latvia) Riga	2–3	2–5 (a.e.t.)
Main Path
Rijeka (Croatia)	2–0	(Republic of Ireland) Derry City	1–0	1–0
İstanbul Başakşehir (Turkey)	1–3	(Finland) Inter Turku	1–1	0–2
Lugano (Switzerland)	6–1	(Kosovo) Dukagjini	1–0	5–1
HJK (Finland)	8–0	(Northern Ireland) Coleraine	5–0	3–0
FCSB (Romania)	3–7	(Latvia) Auda	2–3	1–4
RFS (Latvia)	5–2	(Iceland) Vestri	4–1	1–1
Raków Częstochowa (Poland)	7–1	(Malta) Valletta	3–1	4–0
Liepāja (Latvia)	1–5	Austria Wien	0–2	1–3
Debrecen (Hungary)	1–0	(Armenia) Pyunik	1–0	0–0
GAIS (Sweden)	1–6	(Denmark) Nordsjælland	1–0	0–6
IFK Göteborg (Sweden)	4–3	(Estonia) FCI Levadia	1–2	3–1 (a.e.t.)
Žilina (Slovakia)	3–4	(Poland) GKS Katowice	2–1	1–3
Varaždin (Croatia)	3–4	(Czech Republic) Jablonec	3–2	0–2
Dila Gori (Georgia (country))	0–7	(Cyprus) Apollon Limassol	0–4	0–3
Bravo (Slovenia)	3–4	(North Macedonia) Shkëndija	2–1	1–3
Universitatea Cluj (Romania)	3–5	(Norway) Brann	2–2	1–3
Shelbourne (Republic of Ireland)	6–4	(Estonia) Nõmme Kalju	5–2	1–2
Valur (Iceland)	3–2	(Bosnia and Herzegovina) Zrinjski Mostar	1–0	2–2
Zimbru Chișinău (Moldova)	2–3	(Armenia) Noah	1–1	1–2
Dinamo Tbilisi (Georgia (country))	5–7	(Lithuania) Žalgiris	3–0	2–7
Aluminij (Slovenia)	1–4	(Albania) Dinamo City	1–1	0–3
DAC Dunajská Streda (Slovakia)	4–0	(Bosnia and Herzegovina) Velež Mostar	1–0	3–0
BATE Borisov (Belarus)	1–5	(Switzerland) Sion	1–1	0–4
Stjarnan (Iceland)	2–2 (4–5 p)	(Finland) Ilves	1–0	1–2 (a.e.t.)
Motherwell (Scotland)	5–0	(Faroe Islands) HB	2–0	3–0
Panevėžys (Lithuania)	2–2 (2–3 p)	(Kazakhstan) Tobol	1–1	1–1 (a.e.t.)
Malisheva (Kosovo)	3–4	(Scotland) Hibernian	2–0	1–4
Neftçi (Azerbaijan)	3–4	(Belarus) Dinamo Minsk	2–4	1–0
Paks (Hungary)	3–4	(Greece) Panathinaikos	1–2	2–2
Železničar Pančevo (Serbia)	0–5	(Portugal) Braga	0–1	0–4
Vojvodina (Serbia)	2–8	(Netherlands) Ajax	1–4	1–4
Polissya Zhytomyr (Ukraine)	4–5	(Denmark) Copenhagen	3–3	1–2
LNZ Cherkasy (Ukraine)	0–0 (2–4 p)	(Belgium) Gent	0–0	0–0 (a.e.t.)
FC Santa Coloma (Andorra)	3–9	(Austria) Rapid Wien	1–3	2–6
Hapoel Tel Aviv (Israel)	4–2	(Bulgaria) Ludogorets Razgrad	2–0	2–2
Alashkert (Armenia)	1–4	(Romania) CFR Cluj	1–1	0–3
Bohemians (Republic of Ireland)	4–4 (5–4 p)	(Kosovo) Ballkani	2–1	2–3 (a.e.t.)
Paide Linnameeskond (Estonia)	2–1	(Azerbaijan) Zira	1–0	1–1
Vaduz (Liechtenstein)	6–0	(Andorra) Atlètic Club d'Escaldes	4–0	2–0
Spartak Trnava (Slovakia)	0–0 (3–5 p)	(Bulgaria) CSKA 1948	0–0	0–0 (a.e.t.)
NSÍ (Faroe Islands)	3–3 (4–3 p)	(Slovenia) Koper	0–2	3–1 (a.e.t.)
AEK Larnaca (Cyprus)	3–3 (3–4 p)	(Israel) Beitar Jerusalem	0–1	3–2 (a.e.t.)
Partizan (Serbia)	5–0	(Luxembourg) UNA Strassen	4–0	1–0

=== Third qualifying round ===
The draw for the third qualifying round was held on 20 July 2026. The first legs were played on 4, 5 and 6 August, and the second legs were played on 11, 12 and 13 August 2026.

The winners of the ties advanced to the play-off round.

Third qualifying round
Team 1	Agg.	Team 2	1st leg	2nd leg
Champions Path
Tre Fiori (San Marino)	1–9	(Kosovo) Drita	1–4	0–5
Borac Banja Luka (Bosnia and Herzegovina)	2–2 (4–2 p)	(Belarus) ML Vitebsk	1–0	1–2 (a.e.t.)
Inter Club d'Escaldes (Andorra)	6–0 (Note: Order of legs reversed after original draw.)	(Estonia) Flora	2–0	4–0
Riga (Latvia)	2–1	(Hungary) ETO Győr	1–0	1–1
Main Path
Inter Turku (Finland)	4–3	(Liechtenstein) Vaduz	2–1	2–2
Žalgiris (Lithuania)	2–9	(Croatia) Hajduk Split	2–5	0–4
Partizan (Serbia)	5–1	(Kazakhstan) Tobol	3–0	2–1
Panathinaikos (Greece)	3–2	(Bulgaria) CSKA 1948	1–1	2–1 (a.e.t.)
Ajax (Netherlands)	5–3	(Republic of Ireland) Shelbourne	3–1	2–2
Auda (Latvia)	1–4	(Albania) Dinamo City	1–0	0–4
Noah (Armenia)	3–4	(Switzerland) Sion	2–2	1–2
Braga (Portugal)	1–0	(Belarus) Dinamo Minsk	1–0	0–0
Valur (Iceland)	0–7	(Denmark) Nordsjælland	0–2	0–5
Sheriff Tiraspol (Moldova)	2–8	(Switzerland) St. Gallen	1–3	1–5
Hapoel Tel Aviv (Israel)	3–2	(Poland) GKS Katowice	2–0	1–2
Beitar Jerusalem (Israel)	3–3 (2–4 p)	Austria Wien	1–2	2–1 (a.e.t.)
CFR Cluj (Romania)	1–7	(Norway) Tromsø	0–5	1–2
Dynamo Kyiv (Ukraine)	1–2	(Azerbaijan) Qarabağ	1–0	0–2
Brann (Norway)	4–3	(Cyprus) Apollon Limassol	0–1	4–2 (a.e.t.)
Lugano (Switzerland)	4–2	(Faroe Islands) NSÍ	2–0	2–2
Raków Częstochowa (Poland)	1–0	(Sweden) Hammarby IF	0–0	1–0
HJK (Finland)	1–3	(Scotland) Motherwell	1–1	0–2
Hibernian (Scotland)	2–1	(North Macedonia) Shkëndija	2–1	0–0
IFK Göteborg (Sweden)	1–2	(Belgium) Gent	0–1	1–1
Paide Linnameeskond (Estonia)	1–6	(Austria) Rapid Wien	1–4	0–2
Bohemians (Republic of Ireland)	2–5	(Denmark) Midtjylland	0–2	2–3
Debrecen (Hungary)	1–8	(Denmark) Copenhagen	0–3	1–5
Jablonec (Czech Republic)	4–1	(Latvia) RFS	2–0	2–1
Rijeka (Croatia)	2–1	(Finland) Ilves	1–0	1–1
Twente (Netherlands)	9–3	(Slovakia) DAC Dunajská Streda	6–0	3–3

== Play-off round ==
The draw for the play-off round was held on 3 August 2026. The first legs were played on 20 August, and the second legs were played on 26 and 27 August 2026.

The winners of the ties advanced to the league phase.

Play-off round
Team 1	Agg.	Team 2	1st leg	2nd leg
Champions Path
Víkingur Reykjavík (Iceland)	2–6	(Bosnia and Herzegovina) Borac Banja Luka	1–3	1–3
Shamrock Rovers (Republic of Ireland)	1–2	(Finland) KuPS	1–1	0–1
Drita (Kosovo)	2–2 (2–4 p)	(Andorra) Inter Club d'Escaldes	2–2	0–0 (a.e.t.)
KÍ (Faroe Islands)	1–2	(Latvia) Riga	0–0	1–2
Lincoln Red Imps (Gibraltar)	3–2	(Northern Ireland) Larne	0–2	3–0 (a.e.t.)
Main Path
Motherwell (Scotland)	2–7	(Germany) SC Freiburg	1–3	1–4
Górnik Zabrze (Poland)	3–7	(France) Monaco	2–3	1–4
Inter Turku (Finland)	1–4	(Denmark) Copenhagen	0–0	1–4
Heart of Midlothian (Scotland)	4–4 (4–3 p)	(Austria) Rapid Wien	2–2	2–2 (a.e.t.)
Tromsø (Norway)	0–4	(England) Brighton & Hove Albion	0–0	0–4
Hajduk Split (Croatia)	5–4	(Poland) Raków Częstochowa	2–2	3–2 (a.e.t.)
Panathinaikos (Greece)	4–3	(Czech Republic) Hradec Králové	2–2	2–1 (a.e.t.)
Gent (Belgium)	3–2	(Scotland) Hibernian	0–0	3–2
PAOK (Greece)	3–4	(Norway) Brann	1–1	2–3
Atalanta (Italy)	1–0	(Israel) Hapoel Tel Aviv	0–0	1–0
Midtjylland (Denmark)	6–1	(Croatia) Rijeka	2–0	4–1
Rangers (Scotland)	1–1 (3–4 p)	(Czech Republic) Jablonec	1–0	0–1 (a.e.t.)
Nordsjælland (Denmark)	4–2	(Switzerland) St. Gallen	1–0	3–2
Dinamo City (Albania)	3–5	(Cyprus) Pafos	1–1	2–4 (a.e.t.)
Sion (Switzerland)	5–9	(Netherlands) Ajax	2–4	3–5
Braga (Portugal)	2–0	Austria Wien	2–0	0–0
Twente (Netherlands)	4–2	(Azerbaijan) Qarabağ	0–1	4–1 (a.e.t.)
Getafe (Spain)	4–3	(Serbia) Partizan	3–1	1–2
Lugano (Switzerland)	3–2	(Israel) Maccabi Tel Aviv	2–1	1–1

== League phase ==
Location of teams in the 2026–27 UEFA Conference League league phase

The Conference League league phase features 36 teams: the 24 winners of the Conference League play-off round and the 12 losing teams from the Europa League play-off round.

AGF, Egnatia, Iberia 1999, Inter Club d'Escaldes, Kauno Žalgiris, Mjällby AIF, Riga and Sint-Truiden are making their debut appearances in a major UEFA competition group stage or league phase. Inter Club d'Escaldes became the first team from Andorra to play in a major UEFA competition group or league phase.

A total of 30 national associations are being represented in the league phase.

=== Table ===
The top eight ranked teams receive a bye to the round of 16. Teams ranked from 9th to 24th contested the knockout phase play-offs, with the teams ranked from 9th to 16th seeded for the draw, while those ranked 17th to 24th were not. Teams ranked from 25th to 36th are eliminated from European competition.

Pos	Team	Pld	W	D	L	GF	GA	GD	Pts	Qualification
1	(Switzerland) Lugano	3	3	0	0	11	4	+7	9	Advance to round of 16 (seeded)
2	(Greece) Panathinaikos	3	3	0	0	9	3	+6	9	Advance to round of 16 (seeded)
3	(Netherlands) Twente	3	3	0	0	8	2	+6	9	Advance to round of 16 (seeded)
4	(France) Monaco	3	3	0	0	7	1	+6	9	Advance to round of 16 (seeded)
5	(England) Brighton & Hove Albion	3	2	1	0	5	0	+5	7	Advance to round of 16 (seeded)
6	(Norway) Brann	3	2	1	0	7	3	+4	7	Advance to round of 16 (seeded)
7	(Denmark) Copenhagen	3	2	1	0	7	3	+4	7	Advance to round of 16 (seeded)
8	(Romania) Universitatea Craiova	3	2	1	0	6	2	+4	7	Advance to round of 16 (seeded)
9	(Sweden) Mjällby AIF	3	2	1	0	5	1	+4	7	Advance to knockout phase play-offs (seeded)
10	(Belgium) Sint-Truiden	3	2	1	0	4	1	+3	7	Advance to knockout phase play-offs (seeded)
11	(Netherlands) Ajax	3	2	0	1	9	3	+6	6	Advance to knockout phase play-offs (seeded)
12	(Turkey) Trabzonspor	3	2	0	1	6	3	+3	6	Advance to knockout phase play-offs (seeded)
13	(Croatia) Hajduk Split	3	2	0	1	3	2	+1	6	Advance to knockout phase play-offs (seeded)
14	(Germany) SC Freiburg	3	2	0	1	4	5	−1	6	Advance to knockout phase play-offs (seeded)
15	(Serbia) Red Star Belgrade	3	1	1	1	6	6	0	4	Advance to knockout phase play-offs (seeded)
16	(Italy) Atalanta	3	1	1	1	4	4	0	4	Advance to knockout phase play-offs (seeded)
17	(Portugal) Braga	3	1	1	1	2	3	−1	4	Advance to knockout phase play-offs (unseeded)
18	(Belgium) Gent	3	1	1	1	1	2	−1	4	Advance to knockout phase play-offs (unseeded)
19	(Latvia) Riga	3	0	3	0	3	3	0	3	Advance to knockout phase play-offs (unseeded)
20	(Switzerland) Thun	3	1	0	2	3	3	0	3	Advance to knockout phase play-offs (unseeded)
21	(Bosnia and Herzegovina) Borac Banja Luka	3	1	0	2	3	4	−1	3	Advance to knockout phase play-offs (unseeded)
22	(Gibraltar) Lincoln Red Imps	3	1	0	2	3	6	−3	3	Advance to knockout phase play-offs (unseeded)
23	(Czech Republic) Jablonec	3	0	2	1	3	4	−1	2	Advance to knockout phase play-offs (unseeded)
24	(Denmark) AGF	3	0	2	1	1	2	−1	2	Advance to knockout phase play-offs (unseeded)
25	(Denmark) Nordsjælland	3	0	2	1	3	5	−2	2	
26	(Albania) Egnatia	3	0	2	1	2	4	−2	2	
27	(Kazakhstan) Kairat	3	0	2	1	3	7	−4	2	
28	(Bulgaria) CSKA Sofia	3	0	1	2	4	6	−2	1	
29	(Georgia (country)) Iberia 1999	3	0	1	2	2	5	−3	1	
30	(Cyprus) Pafos	3	0	1	2	3	7	−4	1	
31	(Spain) Getafe	3	0	1	2	3	7	−4	1	
32	(Scotland) Heart of Midlothian	3	0	1	2	2	6	−4	1	
33	(Finland) KuPS	3	0	1	2	2	6	−4	1	
34	(Denmark) Midtjylland	3	0	1	2	2	8	−6	1	
35	(Andorra) Inter Club d'Escaldes	3	0	0	3	2	7	−5	0	
36	(Lithuania) Kauno Žalgiris	3	0	0	3	1	11	−10	0	

Updated to match(es) played on 5 November 2026. Source: UEFA
Rules for classification: League phase tiebreakers

=== Results ===
Matchday 1
Home team	Score	Away team
Lugano (Switzerland)	3–2	(Serbia) Red Star Belgrade
Hajduk Split (Croatia)	2–1	(Netherlands) Ajax
Gent (Belgium)	1–0	(Denmark) AGF
Egnatia (Albania)	1–1	(Denmark) Midtjylland
KuPS (Finland)	2–4	(Turkey) Trabzonspor
Mjällby AIF (Sweden)	2–0	(Andorra) Inter Club d'Escaldes
Panathinaikos (Greece)	2–1	(Bosnia and Herzegovina) Borac Banja Luka
CSKA Sofia (Bulgaria)	1–2	(France) Monaco
Riga (Latvia)	1–1	(Kazakhstan) Kairat
Universitatea Craiova (Romania)	1–1	(Spain) Getafe
Atalanta (Italy)	3–1	(Cyprus) Pafos
Brighton & Hove Albion (England)	4–0	(Lithuania) Kauno Žalgiris
Copenhagen (Denmark)	3–0	(Portugal) Braga
Twente (Netherlands)	1–0	(Switzerland) Thun
Heart of Midlothian (Scotland)	1–1	(Denmark) Nordsjælland
Sint-Truiden (Belgium)	2–0	(Georgia (country)) Iberia 1999
SC Freiburg (Germany)	3–2	(Czech Republic) Jablonec
Brann (Norway)	2–1	(Gibraltar) Lincoln Red Imps

Matchday 2
Home team	Score	Away team
Kairat (Kazakhstan)	1–5	(Greece) Panathinaikos
Iberia 1999 (Georgia (country))	1–1	(Sweden) Mjällby AIF
Nordsjælland (Denmark)	2–2	(Bulgaria) CSKA Sofia
Red Star Belgrade (Serbia)	2–2	(Denmark) Copenhagen
Jablonec (Czech Republic)	0–0	(England) Brighton & Hove Albion
Kauno Žalgiris (Lithuania)	1–4	(Norway) Brann
Getafe (Spain)	2–5	(Switzerland) Lugano
Inter Club d'Escaldes (Andorra)	1–3	(Romania) Universitatea Craiova
Pafos (Cyprus)	1–1	(Latvia) Riga
Trabzonspor (Turkey)	2–0	(Scotland) Heart of Midlothian
Ajax (Netherlands)	2–0	(Italy) Atalanta
AGF (Denmark)	1–1	(Albania) Egnatia
Monaco (France)	3–0	(Germany) SC Freiburg
Midtjylland (Denmark)	0–1	(Belgium) Sint-Truiden
Thun (Switzerland)	0–1	(Croatia) Hajduk Split
Borac Banja Luka (Bosnia and Herzegovina)	2–0	(Finland) KuPS
Lincoln Red Imps (Gibraltar)	1–4	(Netherlands) Twente
Braga (Portugal)	2–0	(Belgium) Gent

Matchday 3
Home team	Score	Away team
AGF (Denmark)	0–0	(Portugal) Braga
Atalanta (Italy)	1–1	(Kazakhstan) Kairat
Midtjylland (Denmark)	1–6	(Netherlands) Ajax
Thun (Switzerland)	3–1	(Scotland) Heart of Midlothian
Red Star Belgrade (Serbia)	2–1	(Andorra) Inter Club d'Escaldes
KuPS (Finland)	0–0	(Belgium) Gent
Lincoln Red Imps (Gibraltar)	1–0	(Croatia) Hajduk Split
Mjällby AIF (Sweden)	2–0	(Bosnia and Herzegovina) Borac Banja Luka
Trabzonspor (Turkey)	0–1	(Germany) SC Freiburg
Monaco (France)	2–0	(Denmark) Nordsjælland
Copenhagen (Denmark)	2–1	(Georgia (country)) Iberia 1999
Lugano (Switzerland)	3–0	(Lithuania) Kauno Žalgiris
Twente (Netherlands)	3–1	(Cyprus) Pafos
Getafe (Spain)	0–1	(England) Brighton & Hove Albion
Sint-Truiden (Belgium)	1–1	(Norway) Brann
Panathinaikos (Greece)	2–1	(Bulgaria) CSKA Sofia
Riga (Latvia)	1–1	(Czech Republic) Jablonec
Universitatea Craiova (Romania)	2–0	(Albania) Egnatia

Matchday 4
Home team	Score	Away team
Kairat (Kazakhstan)	26 Nov	(Sweden) Mjällby AIF
Ajax (Netherlands)	26 Nov	(Switzerland) Thun
Brighton & Hove Albion (England)	26 Nov	(Romania) Universitatea Craiova
Iberia 1999 (Georgia (country))	26 Nov	(Spain) Getafe
Jablonec (Czech Republic)	26 Nov	(Switzerland) Lugano
Kauno Žalgiris (Lithuania)	26 Nov	(Latvia) Riga
Heart of Midlothian (Scotland)	26 Nov	(France) Monaco
Egnatia (Albania)	26 Nov	(Gibraltar) Lincoln Red Imps
Pafos (Cyprus)	26 Nov	(Denmark) Midtjylland
Brann (Norway)	26 Nov	(Denmark) AGF
Nordsjælland (Denmark)	26 Nov	(Greece) Panathinaikos
Borac Banja Luka (Bosnia and Herzegovina)	26 Nov	(Italy) Atalanta
Hajduk Split (Croatia)	26 Nov	(Belgium) Sint-Truiden
Inter Club d'Escaldes (Andorra)	26 Nov	(Denmark) Copenhagen
Gent (Belgium)	26 Nov	(Serbia) Red Star Belgrade
CSKA Sofia (Bulgaria)	26 Nov	(Turkey) Trabzonspor
Braga (Portugal)	26 Nov	(Finland) KuPS
SC Freiburg (Germany)	26 Nov	(Netherlands) Twente

Matchday 5
Home team	Score	Away team
Kairat (Kazakhstan)	10 Dec	(Romania) Universitatea Craiova
Copenhagen (Denmark)	10 Dec	(Switzerland) Lugano
Iberia 1999 (Georgia (country))	10 Dec	(Serbia) Red Star Belgrade
Getafe (Spain)	10 Dec	(Andorra) Inter Club d'Escaldes
KuPS (Finland)	10 Dec	(Bulgaria) CSKA Sofia
Lincoln Red Imps (Gibraltar)	10 Dec	(Denmark) Midtjylland
Riga (Latvia)	10 Dec	(Italy) Atalanta
SC Freiburg (Germany)	10 Dec	(Greece) Panathinaikos
Brann (Norway)	10 Dec	(Portugal) Braga
Trabzonspor (Turkey)	10 Dec	(Czech Republic) Jablonec
AGF (Denmark)	10 Dec	(Netherlands) Twente
Brighton & Hove Albion (England)	10 Dec	(France) Monaco
Thun (Switzerland)	10 Dec	(Belgium) Gent
Heart of Midlothian (Scotland)	10 Dec	(Bosnia and Herzegovina) Borac Banja Luka
Hajduk Split (Croatia)	10 Dec	(Denmark) Nordsjælland
Sint-Truiden (Belgium)	10 Dec	(Netherlands) Ajax
Egnatia (Albania)	10 Dec	(Lithuania) Kauno Žalgiris
Mjällby AIF (Sweden)	10 Dec	(Cyprus) Pafos

Matchday 6
Home team	Score	Away team
Ajax (Netherlands)	17 Dec	(Spain) Getafe
Monaco (France)	17 Dec	(Gibraltar) Lincoln Red Imps
Atalanta (Italy)	17 Dec	(Sweden) Mjällby AIF
Lugano (Switzerland)	17 Dec	(Belgium) Sint-Truiden
Midtjylland (Denmark)	17 Dec	(Croatia) Hajduk Split
Nordsjælland (Denmark)	17 Dec	(Finland) KuPS
Twente (Netherlands)	17 Dec	(Kazakhstan) Kairat
Borac Banja Luka (Bosnia and Herzegovina)	17 Dec	(Latvia) Riga
Red Star Belgrade (Serbia)	17 Dec	(Turkey) Trabzonspor
Jablonec (Czech Republic)	17 Dec	(Georgia (country)) Iberia 1999
Kauno Žalgiris (Lithuania)	17 Dec	(Germany) SC Freiburg
Inter Club d'Escaldes (Andorra)	17 Dec	(Denmark) AGF
Gent (Belgium)	17 Dec	(Norway) Brann
Pafos (Cyprus)	17 Dec	(Scotland) Heart of Midlothian
Panathinaikos (Greece)	17 Dec	(England) Brighton & Hove Albion
CSKA Sofia (Bulgaria)	17 Dec	(Switzerland) Thun
Braga (Portugal)	17 Dec	(Albania) Egnatia
Universitatea Craiova (Romania)	17 Dec	(Denmark) Copenhagen

== Statistics ==
Statistics exclude qualifying rounds and play-off round.

Table correct as of 5 November 2026.

=== Top goalscorers ===
Rank	Player	Team	Goals	Minutes played
1	(Nigeria) Cyriel Dessers	(Greece) Panathinaikos	3	137
1	(Guinea-Bissau) Franculino	(Turkey) Trabzonspor	3	170
1	(Norway) Noah Holm	(Norway) Brann	3	180
1	(Nigeria) Tolu Arokodare	(Netherlands) Ajax	3	184
1	(Chile) Niklas Castro	(Norway) Brann	3	195
1	(Switzerland) Albian Ajeti	(Switzerland) Lugano	3	199
7	Twenty players		2	—N/a

== See also ==
- 2026–27 UEFA Champions League
- 2026–27 UEFA Europa League
- 2026–27 UEFA Women's Champions League
- 2026–27 UEFA Women's Europa Cup
