= Vladan Giljen =

Montenegrin footballer

Personal information
- Full name: Vladan Giljen
- Date of birth: 7 December 1989 (age 36)
- Place of birth: Nikšić, SFR Yugoslavia
- Height: 1.90 m (6 ft 3 in)
- Position: Goalkeeper

Team information
- Current team: Sutjeska Nikšić
- Number: 1

Youth career
- 2000–2007: Sutjeska Nikšić

Senior career*
Years	Team	Apps	(Gls)
2007–2010	Sutjeska Nikšić	112	(0)
2010–2013	Nacional	41	(0)
2013	OFK Beograd	1	(0)
2014	Čelik Nikšić	9	(0)
2015	Tërbuni	14	(0)
2015	Kastrioti	12	(0)
2016–	Sutjeska Nikšić	353	(1)

International career^{‡}
2007	Montenegro U19	3	(0)
2009–2010	Montenegro U21	8	(0)
- * Club domestic league appearances and goals as of 17 June 2026 ‡ National team caps and goals as of 3 September 2013

Vladan Giljen (Montenegrin Cyrillic: Владан Гиљен; born 7 December 1989) is a Montenegrin footballer who plays as a goalkeeper for Sutjeska Nikšić.

== Club career ==
Vladan Giljen, born in Nikšić, is the son of Pero Giljen who was a goalkeeper of FK Sutjeska Nikšić, where Vladan also started his career. After playing 3 seasons with Sutjeska in the Montenegrin First League he moved to Portugal and signed with top league side C.D. Nacional in summer 2010. He made his Liga Sagres debut for C.D. Nacional on February 2, 2012, in a 2–0 win against Paços de Ferreira. After playing 3 seasons with Nacional, he joined Serbian side OFK Beograd in summer 2013.

== International career ==
Vladan Giljen played for the Montenegrin U19 and U21 teams.

== Career statistics ==
=== Club ===
As of match played 31 July 2025

Appearances and goals by club, season and competition
Club	Season	League			National cup		League cup		Europe		Total	
Club	Season	League	Apps	Goals	Apps	Goals	Apps	Goals	Apps	Goals	Apps	Goals
Nacional	2010–11	Primeira Liga	0	0	0	0	0	0	—		0	0
Nacional	2011–12	Primeira Liga	12	0	5	0	1	0	—		18	0
Nacional	2012–13	Primeira Liga	9	0	1	0	0	0	—		10	0
Nacional	Total		21	0	6	0	1	0	—		28	0
OFK Beograd	2013–14	Serbian SuperLiga	1	0	2	0	—		—		3	0
Čelik Nikšić	2013–14	Montenegrin First League	9	0	—		—		—		9	0
Tërbuni	2014–15	Kategoria e Parë	14	0	0	0	—		—		14	0
Kastrioti	2015–16	Kategoria e Parë	12	0	3	0	—		—		15	0
Sutjeska Nikšić	2016–17	Montenegrin First League	31	0	7	0	—		—		38	0
Sutjeska Nikšić	2017–18	Montenegrin First League	34	0	4	0	—		1	0	39	0
Sutjeska Nikšić	2018–19	Montenegrin First League	34	0	2	0	—		4	0	40	0
Sutjeska Nikšić	2019–20	Montenegrin First League	21	0	0	0	—		6	0	27	0
Sutjeska Nikšić	2020–21	Montenegrin First League	28	0	1	0	—		1	0	30	0
Sutjeska Nikšić	2021–22	Montenegrin First League	28	1	0	0	—		4	0	32	1
Sutjeska Nikšić	2022–23	Montenegrin First League	31	0	0	0	—		4	0	35	0
Sutjeska Nikšić	2023–24	Montenegrin First League	21	0	0	0	—		1	0	22	0
Sutjeska Nikšić	2024–25	Montenegrin First League	29	0	0	0	—		—		29	0
Sutjeska Nikšić	2025–26	Montenegrin First League	0	0	0	0	—		4	0	4	0
Sutjeska Nikšić	Total		257	1	14	0	—		25	0	296	1
Career total			314	1	25	0	1	0	25	0	365	1
