= Vasko Kalezić =

Montenegrin footballer

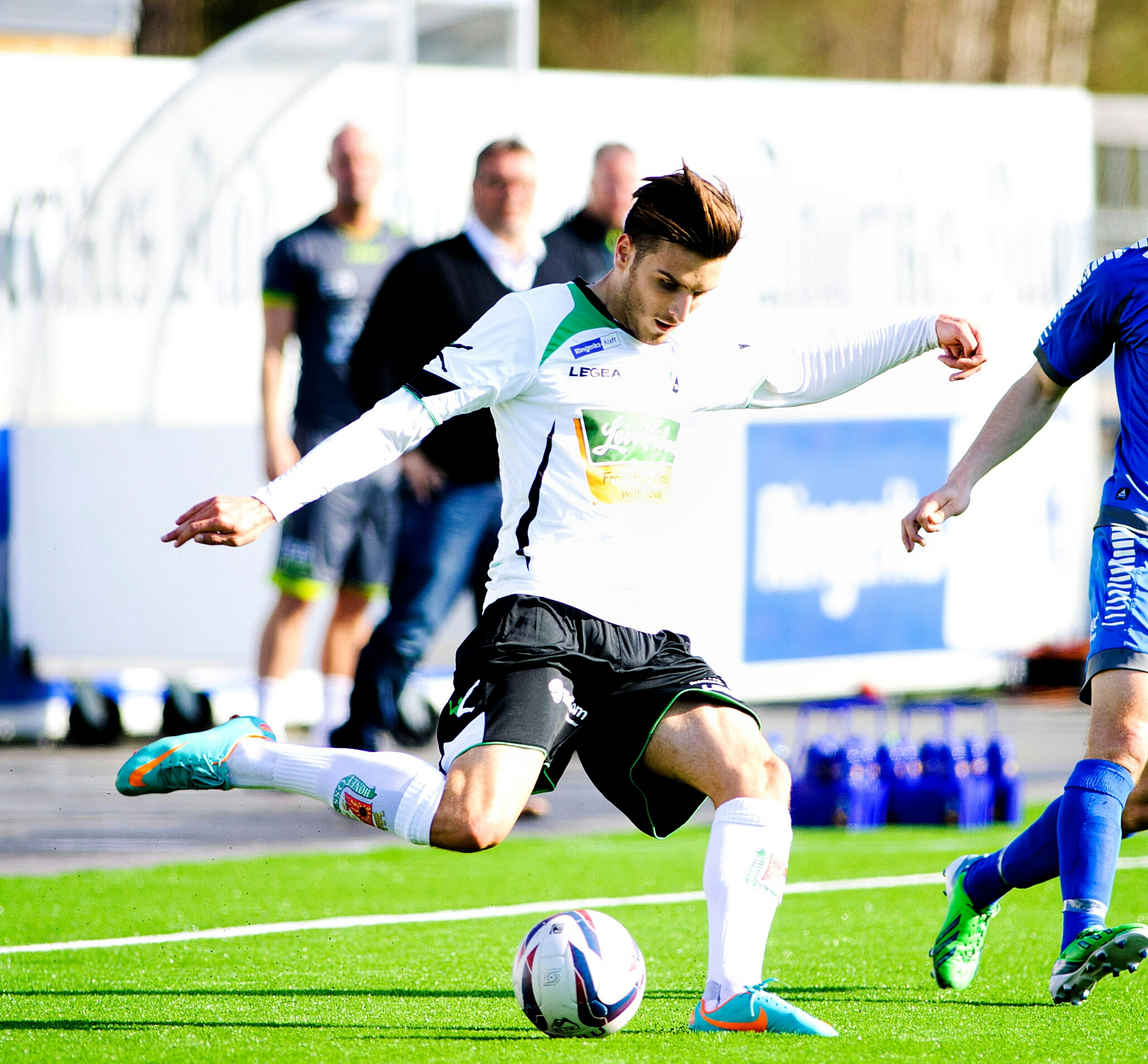
- Kalezić with Hønefoss in 2014

Personal information
- Date of birth: 14 March 1994 (age 32)
- Place of birth: Podgorica, FR Yugoslavia
- Height: 1.85 m (6 ft 1 in)
- Positions: Winger; attacking midfielder

Team information
- Current team: Persijap Jepara
- Number: 70

Youth career
- –2012: Mladost Podgorica

Senior career*
| Years | Team | Apps | (Gls) |
| 2012–2014 | Mladost Podgorica | 12 | (2) |
| 2014–2015 | Hønefoss | 16 | (1) |
| 2015 | → Bærum (loan) | 10 | (0) |
| 2016 | Dacia Chișinău | 4 | (0) |
| 2016 | Anagennisi Deryneia | 14 | (0) |
| 2017 | Zeta | 13 | (3) |
| 2017–2018 | Vojvodina | 20 | (0) |
| 2018–2019 | OFK Titograd | 13 | (0) |
| 2019 | Velež Mostar | 10 | (0) |
| 2020 | Budućnost | 6 | (1) |
| 2020–2021 | Zeta | 34 | (6) |
| 2021–2022 | Yverdon-Sport | 14 | (1) |
| 2023 | Vevey United | 12 | (1) |
| 2023 | Rudar Pljevlja | 16 | (2) |
| 2024–2026 | Sutjeska | 79 | (16) |
| 2026– | Persijap Jepara | 7 | (1) |

International career
| 2014 | Montenegro U21 | 1 | (0) |
| 2020– | Montenegro | 1 | (0) |
- * Club domestic league appearances and goals as of 7 November 2026

Vasko Kalezić (Montenegrin: Васко Калезић; born 14 March 1994) is a Montenegrin professional footballer who plays as a winger or attacking midfielder for Super League club Persijap Jepara.

== Club career ==
After success in qualifying for the UEFA Europa League with OFK Titograd, Kalezić joined Norwegian First Division club Hønefoss BK in winter of 2014, signing a two-year contract. In March 2015 he was loaned to fellow league club Bærum SK until August 2015.

After Baerum, Kalezić returned to Hønefoss, before transferring to Moldovan National Division club Dacia Chișinău on 23 January 2016. After a spell with Cypriot side Anagennisi Deryneia, Kalezić returned to Montenegro and signed with FK Zeta.

On 29 August 2017, he signed a two-year deal with Serbian SuperLiga club Vojvodina. In 2018, he came back to Titograd, but then, on 31 July 2019 signed with Premier League of Bosnia and Herzegovina club Velež Mostar. Kalezić made his official debut for Velež on 17 August 2019, in a 1–0 home league win against Široki Brijeg. In December 2019, the club terminated his contract.

On 17 January 2020, Kalezić joined Montenegrin club Budućnost Podgorica.

On 18 August 2022, his contract with Yverdon-Sport was terminated by mutual consent.

== International career ==
Kalezić represented the Montenegro national U21 team in 2014, making 1 appearance for the country but did not score a goal.

He made his national team debut on 7 October 2020 in a friendly against Latvia.
