= Montenegro national under-19 football team =

National U-19 association football team

Montenegro
- Nickname: Hrabri Sokoli (The Brave Falcons)
- Association: Football Association of Montenegro
- Confederation: UEFA (Europe)
- Head coach: Nenad Vukčević
- Home stadium: Stadion pod Goricom
- FIFA code: MNE
First colours	Second colours

First international
- Italy 3–1 Montenegro (Italy; 10 November 2007)

Biggest win
- Montenegro 5–0 Faroe Islands (Macedonia; 6 September 2013)

Biggest defeat
- England 6–0 Montenegro (England; 24 May 2014)

World Cup
- Appearances: 0

European Championship
- Appearances: 1 (2025)

The Montenegro national under-19 football team is the national under-19 football team of Montenegro and is controlled by the Football Association of Montenegro. The team competes in the European Under-19 Football Championship, held every year.

== Competitive Record ==
=== UEFA European Under-19 Championship ===
UEFA European U-19 Championship Record as follows:

Played as	Year	Result	GP	W	D*	L	GS	GA
(Serbia and Montenegro) SCG	(Norway) 2002	did not qualify						
(Serbia and Montenegro) SCG	(Liechtenstein) 2003	did not qualify						
(Serbia and Montenegro) SCG	(Switzerland) 2004	did not qualify						
(Serbia and Montenegro) SCG	(Northern Ireland) 2005	Semifinals	4	3	0	1	9	5
(Serbia and Montenegro) SCG	(Poland) 2006	did not qualify						
Montenegro	(Austria) 2007	did not qualify						
Montenegro	(Czech Republic) 2008	did not qualify						
Montenegro	(Ukraine) 2009	did not qualify						
Montenegro	(France) 2010	did not qualify						
Montenegro	(Romania) 2011	did not qualify						
Montenegro	(Estonia) 2012	did not qualify						
Montenegro	(Lithuania) 2013	did not qualify						
Montenegro	(Hungary) 2014	did not qualify						
Montenegro	(Greece) 2015	did not qualify						
Montenegro	(Germany) 2016	did not qualify						
Montenegro	(Georgia (country)) 2017	did not qualify						
Montenegro	(Finland) 2018	did not qualify						
Montenegro	(Armenia) 2019	did not qualify						
Montenegro	(Northern Ireland) ~~2020~~	Cancelled						
Montenegro	(Romania) ~~2021~~	Cancelled						
Montenegro	(Slovakia) 2022	did not qualify						
Montenegro	(Malta) 2023	did not qualify						
Montenegro	(Northern Ireland) 2024	did not qualify						
Montenegro	(Romania) 2025	Group stage	3	0	0	3	1	12
Montenegro	(Wales) 2026	did not qualify						
Montenegro	(Czech Republic) 2027	to be determined						
Montenegro	(Bulgaria) 2028	to be determined						
Total		2/21	7	3	0	4	10	17

* Draws include knockout matches decided by penalty shootout.

== Players ==
=== Current squad ===
The following players were named in the squad for 2027 UEFA European Under-19 Championship qualification matches against Georgia and Iceland on 3 and 6 June 2026.

No.	Pos.	Player	Date of birth (age)	Club
	GK	Dimitrije Minić	8 July 2008 (age 18)	(Football Association of Serbia) Spartak Subotica
1	GK	Tomaš Ðurović	14 September 2007 (age 19)	(Football Association of Montenegro) Iskra
13	DF	Todor Miljanić	3 November 2007 (age 19)	(Football Association of Montenegro) Sutjeska
17	DF	Luka Šćekić	16 October 2007 (age 19)	(Football Association of Montenegro) Podgorica
5	DF	Vojislav Jokić	18 April 2007 (age 19)	(Football Association of Serbia) OFK Beograd
20	DF	Lazar Martinović	16 February 2007 (age 19)	(Romanian Football Federation) Universitatea Craiova
3	DF	Meldin Kojić	13 May 2007 (age 19)	(Football Association of Montenegro) Jezero
	DF	Mladen Račić	7 August 2007 (age 19)	(Football Association of Bosnia and Herzegovina) FK Sarajevo
2	DF	Zarija Mugoša	13 July 2007 (age 19)	(Football Association of Montenegro) Bokelj
14	MF	Petar Ražnatović	7 August 2008 (age 18)	(Football Association of Montenegro) Arsenal
22	MF	Imran Redžepagić	19 February 2007 (age 19)	(Football Association of Montenegro) Jezero
4	MF	Nikola Balevic	24 December 2007 (age 18)	(Football Association of Montenegro) Petrovac
16	MF	Luka Raičević	3 October 2007 (age 19)	(Football Association of Serbia) FK Jedinstvo Ub
8	MF	Lazar Savović	12 January 2008 (age 18)	(Football Association of Montenegro) Budućnost
10	MF	Andrija Vukoje	23 March 2008 (age 18)	(Italian Football Federation) Inter Milan
14	MF	Luka Brajović	23 May 2007 (age 19)	(Football Association of Montenegro) Iskra
18	MF	Andrej Božović	25 November 2007 (age 18)	(Football Association of Montenegro) Mladost
11	MF	Matija Jovanović	19 February 2008 (age 18)	(Football Association of Montenegro) Iskra
7	FW	Vuk Vlahović	10 January 2007 (age 19)	(Croatian Football Federation) Dinamo Zagreb
	FW	Petar Jauković	12 June 2007 (age 19)	(Football Association of Serbia) Vojvodina
21	FW	Danilo Pejović	4 March 2008 (age 18)	(Football Association of Montenegro) OFK Grbalj
19	FW	Dragutin Šaranović	8 December 2007 (age 18)	(Football Association of Montenegro) FK Kom
9	FW	Jagoš Roganović	8 January 2007 (age 19)	(Football Association of Montenegro) Mladost
15	FW	Omar Krajina	27 February 2007 (age 19)	(Swedish Football Association) Malmö

=== Recent call-ups ===
The following players have also been called up to the Montenegro U19 team within the last twelve months and remain eligible for selection.

Pos.	Player	Date of birth (age)	Caps	Goals	Club	Latest call-up
GK	Ognjen Milović	14 March 2006 (age 20)	13	0	(Montenegro) Kom	Spain, 19 June 2025
DF	Miloš Vračar (captain)	10 June 2006 (age 20)	21	0	(Montenegro) Podgorica	Spain, 19 June 2025
DF	Lazar Maraš	1 January 2006 (age 20)	24	1	(Montenegro) Dečić Admiral Bet	Spain, 19 June 2025
DF	Bojan Damjanović	6 June 2006 (age 20)	2	0	(Montenegro) Sutjeska	Spain, 19 June 2025
DF	Bodin Tomašević	12 May 2006 (age 20)	22	1	(Italy) Bologna	Spain, 19 June 2025
DF	Aleksa Karadžić	4 March 2006 (age 20)	7	0	(Montenegro) Iskra	Spain, 19 June 2025
DF	Lazar Šekularac	11 October 2006 (age 20)	7	0	(Montenegro) Jedinstvo Franca	Spain, 19 June 2025
MF	Marko Perović	5 March 2006 (age 20)	21	4	(Spain) Almería	Spain, 19 June 2025
MF	Stefan Đukanović	23 June 2006 (age 20)	11	1	(Montenegro) Budućnost	Spain, 19 June 2025
MF	Danilo Vukanić	11 August 2006 (age 20)	17	3	(Montenegro) Budućnost	Spain, 19 June 2025
MF	Andrej Camaj	12 March 2006 (age 20)	16	2	(Montenegro) Budućnost	Spain, 19 June 2025
MF	Lazar Zlatičanin	15 April 2006 (age 20)	3	1	(Montenegro) Mornar	Spain, 19 June 2025
MF	Danilo Ćetković	19 July 2006 (age 20)	9	0	(Montenegro) Sutjeska	Spain, 19 June 2025
MF	Vuk Vlahović	10 January 2007 (age 19)	9	1	(Croatia) Dinamo Zagreb	Spain, 19 June 2025
FW	Marko Tadić	25 February 2006 (age 20)	12	9	(Serbia) Partizan	Spain, 19 June 2025
FW	Filip Perović	18 July 2006 (age 20)	10	2	(Montenegro) Iskra	Spain, 19 June 2025
FW	Andrej Kostić	16 January 2007 (age 19)	10	2	(Montenegro) Budućnost	Spain, 19 June 2025
