= Bojan Zogović =

Montenegrin footballer (born 1989)

Personal information
- Date of birth: 16 February 1989 (age 37)
- Place of birth: Mojkovac, SFR Yugoslavia
- Height: 1.89 m (6 ft 2 in)
- Position: Goalkeeper

Team information
- Current team: Arsenal Tivat
- Number: 1

Youth career
- Brskovo
- –2006: Red Star Belgrade

Senior career*
Years	Team	Apps	(Gls)
2006	Berane		
2006–2007	Crvena Stijena		
2007–2009	Radnički Sombor	45	(0)
2010–2011	Banat Zrenjanin	5	(0)
2010	→ Radnički Sombor (loan)	1	(0)
2011	Marsonia 1909	12	(0)
2012	Rijeka	0	(0)
2012	Berane		
2013–2014	Timok	30	(0)
2014–2016	Metalac Gornji Milanovac	24	(0)
2016	Novi Pazar	10	(0)
2017	Radnički Niš	10	(0)
2017	Rad	12	(0)
2018–2019	Bačka	35	(0)
2019–2020	Zira	8	(0)
2020	Kolubara	1	(0)
2020–2023	Vllaznia Shkodër	106	(0)
2023	Novi Pazar	0	(0)
2024–	Arsenal Tivat	83	(0)
- * Club domestic league appearances and goals as of 17 June 2026

Bojan Zogović (Serbian Cyrillic: Бојан Зоговић; born 16 February 1989) is a Montenegrin professional footballer who plays as a goalkeeper for Arsenal Tivat.

== Club career ==
Born in Berane, Zogović started training football with FK Brskovo at the age of 6. He was a member of Red Star Belgrade U17 team, before he started his senior career with FK Berane in 2006. 2006–07 season he spent with Crvena Stijena and later moved in Radnički Sombor with which he promoted in the Serbian First League. He also performed for Marsonia 1909 and Rijeka in Croatia. In summer 2014, Zogović joined Metalac Gornji Milanovac from FK Timok and signed two-year contract. Two years later, Zogović moved to Novi Pazar. In February 2017, Zogović joined Radnički Niš. In summer same year, Zogović moved to Rad, making a debut for new club in the 4th fixture match of the 2017–18 Serbian SuperLiga campaign against Zemun. Making 13 appearances in both domestic competitions for the club, Zogović left Rad in the mid-season. Shortly after, in January 2018, Zogović signed with the Montenegrin First League side Dečić.

== Career statistics ==
As of 5 February 2018

Appearances and goals by club, season and competition
Club	Season	League			Cup		Continental		Other		Total	
Club	Season	Division	Apps	Goals	Apps	Goals	Apps	Goals	Apps	Goals	Apps	Goals
Radnički Sombor	2007–08	Serbian League Vojvodina	1	0	—		—		—		1	0
Radnički Sombor	2008–09	Serbian League Vojvodina	28	0	—		—		—		28	0
Radnički Sombor	2009–10	Serbian First League	16	0	—		—		—		16	0
Radnički Sombor	Total		46	0	—		—		—		46	0
Banat Zrenjanin	2009–10	Serbian First League	0	0	—		—		—		0	0
Banat Zrenjanin	2010–11	Serbian First League	5	0	—		—		—		5	0
Banat Zrenjanin	2011–12	Serbian First League	0	0	—		—		—		0	0
Banat Zrenjanin	Total		5	0	—		—		—		5	0
Radnički Sombor (loan)	2010–11	Serbian First League	1	0	—		—		—		1	0
Marsonia 1909	2011–12	2. HNL	12	0	—		—		—		12	0
Rijeka	2011–12	1. HNL	0	0	—		—		—		0	0
Timok	2012–13	Serbian First League	6	0	—		—		—		6	0
Timok	2013–14	Serbian First League	24	0	—		—		—		24	0
Timok	Total		30	0	—		—		—		30	0
Metalac Gornji Milanovac	2014–15	Serbian First League	22	0	2	0	—		2 (Note: Appearances in the promotion league play-off)	0	26	0
Metalac Gornji Milanovac	2015–16	Serbian SuperLiga	2	0	1	0	—		—		3	0
Metalac Gornji Milanovac	2016–17	Serbian SuperLiga	0	0	—		—		—		0	0
Metalac Gornji Milanovac	Total		24	0	3	0	—		2	0	29	0
Novi Pazar	2016–17	Serbian SuperLiga	10	0	1	0	—		—		11	0
Radnički Niš	2016–17	Serbian SuperLiga	10	0	—		—		—		10	0
Rad	2017–18	Serbian SuperLiga	12	0	1	0	—		—		13	0
Bačka	2018–19	Serbian SuperLiga	0	0	—		—		—		0	0
Career total			149	0	5	0	—		2	0	156	0
