= Demir Škrijelj =

Montenegrin footballer

Personal information
- Date of birth: 10 July 1997 (age 29)
- Place of birth: Berane, FR Yugoslavia (now Montenegro)
- Height: 1.76 m (5 ft 9 in)
- Position: Left winger

Team information
- Current team: Mornar
- Number: 10

Senior career*
Years	Team	Apps	(Gls)
2014–2017	Zeta	23	(0)
2016–2017	→ Bratstvo (loan)	10	(0)
2017–2019	Ibar	29	(3)
2019–2020	Ibar	27	(3)
2020–2024	Mornar	113	(8)
2024–2025	Vorskla Poltava	2	(0)
2025–	Mornar	49	(2)

International career^{‡}
2024–	Montenegro	1	(0)
- * Club domestic league appearances and goals as of 1 June 2026 ‡ National team caps and goals as of 21 March 2024

Demir Škrijelj (Montenegrin: Демир Шкријељ; Albanian: Demir Shkreli; born 10 July 1997) is a Montenegrin football player who plays as a left winger for Mornar and the Montenegro national team.

== International career ==
He debuted for the Montenegro national team on 21 March 2024 in a friendly match against Belarus.
