= Stefan Golubović (footballer, born 1996) =

Serbian footballer (born 1996)

Personal information
- Full name: Stefan Golubović
- Date of birth: 1 August 1996 (age 30)
- Place of birth: Čačak, FR Yugoslavia
- Height: 1.82 m (6 ft 0 in)
- Position: Forward

Team information
- Current team: Southern
- Number: 22

Youth career
- 2014–2015: SV Wiesbaden

Senior career*
Years	Team	Apps	(Gls)
2016–2019	Mladost Lučani	48	(5)
2019–2020	Sloga Požega		
2020	GOŠK Gabela	1	(0)
2020–2023	Trayal	60	(15)
2023–2025	Boeung Ket	48	(23)
2025	FK Dečić Tuzi	19	(1)
2026–	Southern	6	(4)
- * Club domestic league appearances and goals as of 21 November 2026

Stefan Golubović (Serbian Cyrillic: Стефан Голубовић; born 1 August 1996) is a Serbian professional footballer who currently plays as a forward for Hong Kong Premier League club Southern.

== Club career ==
On 8 July 2026, Golubović joined Hong Kong Premier League club Southern.
