= FK Arsenal Tivat =

Arsenal Tivat
- Full name: Fudbalski klub Arsenal Tivat
- Nickname: Arsenal
- Founded: 1914; 112 years ago
- Ground: Stadion u parku, Tivat, Montenegro
- Capacity: 2,000
- Chairman: Dejan Kandić
- Manager: Radislav Dragićević
- League: Montenegrin First League
- 2025–26: Montenegrin First League, 7th of 10
- Website: fk-arsenal.me, Instagram, Facebook, X, Youtube
Home colours	Away colours

FK Arsenal is a Montenegrin professional football club based in the coastal town of Tivat, founded in 1914. Currently, the club is competing in the Montenegrin First League.

== History ==
=== 1914–1940 ===
Founded in 1914, Arsenal is the second oldest football club in Montenegro, after FK Lovćen which was founded a year before. The club was first established as NK Orjen. During 1930, the team was merged with another club from Tivat - NK Zrinjski. After the fusion, the team started to play under the new name NK Arsenal. The name was derived from the nearby naval repair facility "MRTZ Sava Kovačević", known colloquially as Arsenal.
NK Arsenal made biggest successes in history in the period between 1925 and 1940. Team from Tivat at that time played in the Montenegrin Football Championship, with remarkable success at season 1937 – with winning the title of Montenegrin champion. Arsenal became the only club outside Podgorica and Cetinje who won the title on Montenegrin championship in the period between 1925 and 1940.

=== 1945–2006 ===
After World War II, NK Arsenal played in the first season of the Montenegrin Republic League (1946), together with Budućnost, Lovćen and Sutjeska. NK Arsenal gained promotion to the Yugoslav Second League (Zone B) with debut in the 1955–56 season. They played three years in the Second League, and got relegated to the Republic League after the 1957–58 season.

Most seasons in the period between 1958 and 2006 Arsenal spent in the Montenegrin Republic League, with second place in the 1958–59 season as a major success. During the 1980s and 1990s, Arsenal produced many talented players. Its youth team which included the generation of players born in 1971–72 is regarded within the club as the most talented one. It was coached by Radovan Vukotić and Zlatko Vuksanović and produced players such as Ivica Kralj (played with Partizan, Porto and PSV), Željko Buzić (Hajduk Kula), Slaven Borović (Čukarički) or Zoran Vuksanović (Radnički Niš and Hajduk Kula).

=== 2006–present ===
After Montenegrin independence, FK Arsenal became a member of the Montenegrin Second League in its inaugural season (2006–07). With often relegations to the Montenegrin Third League, Arsenal spent ten seasons in the Second League until now.

During this period, Arsenal won the Southern Region Cup three times (2009, 2010, 2011). In the 2021–22 season, Arsenal were placed in second place of the Montenegrin Second League, after which they defeated FK Podgorica in the playoffs and were promoted to the Montenegrin First League for the first time in its history.

On July 16, 2025, Arsenal Tivat was banned from European competition for 10 years. UEFA's decision follows an investigation into suspected match-fixing in a Conference League 2023-24 qualifying match against Alashkert of Armenia. The club must also pay a fine of half a million euros. The match that raised suspicions occurred during the UEFA Conference League qualifiers. The first leg in Yerevan ended in a 1–1 draw, while in the return leg in Montenegro, Alashkert thrashed the hosts 6–1. Even before the match began, bookmakers in several countries were already reporting alarming movements in the betting market, with bets on a resounding victory for the Armenian national team. After a lengthy investigation, during which both officials and players were questioned, the UEFA Disciplinary Committee decided on the sanctions.

=== First League Record ===
For the first time, Arsenal played in the Montenegrin First League in the 2022–23 season. Below is a list of FK Arsenal scores in the First League by every single season.

Season	Pos	G	W	D	L	GF	GA
2022–23	3	36	13	11	12	39	39
2023–24	7	36	9	15	12	43	58
2024–25	8	36	10	12	14	32	47

== European record ==
On 16 July 2025, Arsenal Tivat was banned from entering UEFA club competitions for ten years due to match fixing during the UEFA Conference League tie against Alashkert in July 2023. Player Nikola Čelebić and official Rango Krgovic were also banned for life from football. On 24 September 2025, the ban was reduced to seven years on appeal.

Season	Competition	Round	Club	Home	Away	Agg.
2023–24	2023-24 UEFA Conference League	1QR	(Armenia) Alashkert	1–6	1–1	2–7

Notes

- QR: Qualifying round

== Honours and achievements ==
- Montenegrin Championship (1922–1940) – 1
  - winners (1): 1937
  - runners-up (3): 1929, Spring 1930, Autumn 1930
- Montenegrin Third League (South Region) – 3
  - winners (3): 2011–12, 2016–17, 2017–18
- Montenegrin Fourth League – 3
  - winners (3): 1979–80, 1983–84, 1987–88
- Montenegrin Cup – 0
  - runners-up (2): 1971, 2023
- Southern Region Cup – 7
  - winners (7): 1974, 1984, 1989, 2010, 2012, 2016, 2018

== Players ==
=== Current squad ===
As of 15 August 2026

Note: Flags indicate national team as defined under FIFA eligibility rules; some limited exceptions apply. Players may hold more than one non-FIFA nationality.

No.	Pos.	Nation	Player
1	GK	MNE	Bojan Zogović
2	DF	MNE	Miloš Maraš
3	DF	MNE	Mihailo Živaljević
4	MF	JPN	Riku Kaneda
5	DF	MNE	Gojko Petović
6	MF	MNE	Vasilije Kašćelan
7	FW	MNE	Andrej Golub
8	MF	MNE	Irfan Šahman
9	FW	MNE	Igor Vukčević
10	MF	MNE	Petar Ražnatović
12	GK	MNE	Ivan Božinović
13	DF	MNE	Zoran Mikijelj
14	MF	ISR	Ron Rozin
15	DF	MNE	Petar Mališić
16	MF	MNE	Vladimir Kašćelan
18	FW	MNE	Nemanja Bojanić

No.	Pos.	Nation	Player
19	FW	MNE	Martin Đukanović
20	MF	MNE	Aleksandar Macanović
21	MF	RUS	Vladimir Shamarin
22	FW	SRB	Petar Šoškić
23	MF	SLE	Santigie Yusuf Sesay
24	DF	MNE	Novica Eraković
26	DF	SRB	Marko Živanović
27	DF	MNE	Aleksa Kralj
28	FW	MNE	Vuk Dajković
29	MF	MNE	Kosta Vujačić
31	GK	MNE	Luka Petković
77	FW	MNE	Staniša Mandić
88	FW	SOM	Abdulsamed Abdullahi
97	DF	MNE	Nemanja Lazarević
98	FW	MNE	Andrej Petrović
99	FW	MNE	Stefan Labović

=== Notable players ===
Below is the list of players who, during their career, played for Arsenal Tivat and represented their countries at the full international level.

- (Serbia and Montenegro) Ivica Kralj
- (Montenegro) Branislav Janković
- (Montenegro) Miloš Milović
- (Montenegro) Darko Nikač
- (Montenegro) Damir Kojašević
- (Montenegro) Šaleta Kordić
- (Somalia) Abdulsamed Abdullahi

== Stadium ==
The club plays at Stadion u Parku (Park Stadium) in Tivat, near the Porto Montenegro Marina, which was formerly the naval repair facility MTRZ Sava Kovačević, popularly known as Arsenal, after which the club was named. Stadium capacity is 2,000 seats on one stand, and it doesn't meet UEFA standards for European competitions.

== See also ==
- Montenegrin Football Championship (1922–1940)
- Montenegrin First League
- Montenegrin clubs in Yugoslav football competitions (1946–2006)
