= FK Bokelj =

Bokelj Kotor
- Full name: Fudbalski klub Bokelj Kotor
- Short name: BOK
- Founded: 1922; 104 years ago
- Ground: Stadion Pod Vrmcem; Kotor; Montenegro
- Capacity: 425
- Chairman: Davor Kumburović
- Manager: Zoran Krivokapić
- League: Montenegrin First League
- 2025–26: Montenegrin First League, 9th of 10
Home colours	Away colours

FK Bokelj is a Montenegrin professional football club based in the coastal town of Kotor. They currently compete in the Montenegrin First League.

== History ==
History of Bokelj started at the second decade of 20th century. The team was founded on 30 July 1922 as SK Primorac. Primorac played its first game against FK Zrinjski Tivat and won 2–1. In 1926, the team was renamed as FK Bokelj and until 1941 played numerous seasons in the Montenegrin Football Championship. In that period, FK Bokelj played four times in the final of the Montenegrin Championship, but never won it.
After the war, Bokelj started to play in the Montenegrin Republic League in 1947. Only four years later, the team from Kotor were promoted to the Yugoslav Second League (season 1951). From that year to 1991, FK Bokelj played overall nine seasons in the Yugoslav Second League. During the other seasons, the club participated in the Montenegrin Republic League (third rank of football in SFR Yugoslavia), winning the title eight times. Except that, in the period between 1988 and 1992, Bokelj played four seasons in the new-established Yugoslav Third League.
In 1999, Bokelj gained a new promotion to the Second League, this time in FR Yugoslavia football system. Until 2006, they spent seven consecutive seasons in the Second League, with second place in the 2002–03 season as their biggest success at that time.
Historical success, FK Bokelj made in summer 2007, with their promotion to the Montenegrin First League. First game at top-tier, FK Bokelj played on 11 August 2007, against Rudar in Pljevlja (0:0). Best result, FK Bokelj made in the 2015–16 season, finished in fourth-placed team in the First League. With that success, the team gained its first participation in European Competitions (2016–17 UEFA Europa League), with games against Serbian-side FK Vojvodina. Until now, the club from Kotor played five seasons in the highest league competition in Montenegro.

=== First League Record ===
For the first time, Bokelj played in the Montenegrin First League in the 2007–08 season. Below is a list of FK Bokelj scores in the First League by every single season.

Season	Pos	G	W	D	L	GF	GA
2007–08	10	33	8	8	17	24	38
2011–12	11	33	5	6	22	21	57
2014–15	8	33	11	8	14	38	45
2015–16	4	33	17	5	11	43	28
2016–17	10	33	8	12	13	28	34
2024–25	6	36	13	5	18	31	50

=== FK Bokelj in European competitions ===
Season	Competition	Round	Club	Home	Away	Agg.
2016-17	2016-17 UEFA Europa League	1QR	(Serbia) Vojvodina	1–1	0–5	1–6

== Honours and achievements ==
- Montenegrin Second League – 3
  - Winners (3): 2010–11, 2013–14, 2023–24
  - Runners-up (2): 2006–07, 2012–13
- Montenegrin Republic League – 8
  - Winners (8): 1947–48, 1950, 1953–54, 1955–56, 1956–57, 1970–71, 1985–86, 1987–88
- Montenegrin Republic Cup – 2
  - Winners (2): 1948–49, 1973–74

== Players ==
=== Current squad ===
As of 15 February 2026

Note: Flags indicate national team as defined under FIFA eligibility rules; some limited exceptions apply. Players may hold more than one non-FIFA nationality.

No.	Pos.	Nation	Player
1	GK	MNE	Dragan Cetković
5	DF	MNE	Nemanja Đurović
7	MF	MNE	Velizar Janketić
8	MF	MNE	Fatih Muković
9	FW	MNE	Šaleta Kordić
10	MF	MNE	Igor Poček
11	FW	MNE	Luka Maraš
15	DF	MNE	Drago Bumbar
17	DF	MNE	Stefan Mršulja
18	DF	MNE	Balša Ćetković
19	FW	GHA	Baba Musah
21	FW	MNE	Stefan Golubović

No.	Pos.	Nation	Player
22	DF	MNE	Stefan Vico
23	DF	MNE	Andrija Krivokapić
26	DF	MNE	Igor Cuković
27	MF	MNE	Balša Radević
29	DF	MNE	Marko Čavor
31	MF	BIH	Bakir Nurković (on loan from Sarajevo)
33	DF	MNE	Bogdan Rašo
77	MF	BRA	Vitinho
80	MF	MNE	Žarko Vilotijević
88	GK	MNE	Stefan Spasojević
99	FW	SRB	Bogdan Stamenković

=== Notable players ===
Below is the list of former Bokelj players who represented their countries at the full international level.

- (Socialist Federal Republic of Yugoslavia) Bruno Knežević
- (Serbia and Montenegro) Nenad Maslovar
- (Serbia and Montenegro) (Montenegro) Dejan Ognjanović
- (Montenegro) Vladan Adžić
- (Montenegro) Mladen Kašćelan
- (Montenegro) Milan Mijatović
- (Montenegro) Miloš Milović
- (Montenegro) Nikola Nikezić
- (Montenegro) Danijel Petković
- (Montenegro) Rade Petrović
- (Montenegro) Aleksandar Šćekić
- (Cameroon) Ibrahim Walidjo
- (Montenegro) Saša Balić

== Historical list of coaches ==
- (Montenegro) Aleksandar Miljenović (2007 - Nov 2007)
- (Montenegro) Ivo Donković (26 Nov 2007 - )
- (Montenegro) Slobodan Drašković (Jul 2010 - Jun 2012)
- (Montenegro) Ratko Stevović (Jul 2012 - Jun 2013)
- (Montenegro) Slobodan Drašković (Jul 2013 - Apr 2017)
- (Montenegro) Milorad Malovrazić (14 Apr 2017 - Jun 2017)
- (Serbia) Marko Vidojević (1 Jul 2017 - 1 Jan 2018)
- (Montenegro) Aleksandar Madžar (8 Jan 2018 - Jun 2018)
- (Montenegro) Milorad Malovrazić (10 Jul 2018 - 27 Apr 2019)
- (Serbia) Dragan Đorđević (30 Apr 2019 - Dec 2019)
- (Montenegro) Slavoljub Bubanja (12 Oct 2019 - Jul 2020)
- (Montenegro) Zoran Krivokapić (22 Oct 2020 - )

== Supporters ==
"Beštije" (The Beasts) is the popular name for FK Bokelj supporters group. Established in 1986, they are the oldest ultras group from Montenegro. Except FK Bokelj, they are also attending games of PVK Primorac.

== Stadium ==
Bokelj's home ground is Stadion pod Vrmcem at the Škaljari suburb in Kotor, not far from the Bay of Kotor. Today, stadium has a capacity of about 425 seats on one terrace. Except Bokelj's matches, at the stadion pod Vrmcem every year is playing final match of Nikša Bućin Cup, competition for Third League clubs from south Montenegro.
In addition to the main field is an auxiliary field with artificial grass that is used for competitions in the junior categories.

== Sponsors ==
- Official sponsor: Port of Kotor
- Official kit supplier: Joma

== See also ==
- Stadion pod Vrmcem
- Kotor
- Montenegrin First League
- Montenegrin clubs in Yugoslav football competitions (1946–2006)
