= 2022–23 Montenegrin Cup =

Tournament details
- Country: Montenegro
- Teams: 16

Final positions
- Champions: Sutjeska (2nd title)
- Runners-up: Arsenal

Tournament statistics
- Matches played: 17
- Goals scored: 44 (2.59 per match)
- Top goal scorer(s): Petar Pavlićević (4 goals)

The 2022–23 Montenegrin Cup was the 17th edition of the knockout football tournament in Montenegro. This season's cup was started on 7 September 2022 and concluded with the final on 29 May 2023. The winners of the cup this season earned a place in the first qualifying round of the 2023–24 UEFA Europa Conference League.

Budućnost were the defending champions from the previous season after defeating Dečić in the final by the score of 1–0.

Sutjeska won the cup for the second time after beating Arsenal on penalties in the final.

== First round ==
The draw for the first round was held on 2 September 2022. The matches were played on 7 September 2022. The first round paired the two teams who had met in the previous season's final. This time around the outcome was reversed, with defending champions Budućnost losing after penalties to Dečić, after their game had finished 1–1.

=== Summary ===
Team 1	Score	Team 2
Jedinstvo	3–1	Mladost DG
Sutjeska	1–0	Jezero
Bokelj	2–3	Arsenal
Zeta	1–3	Rudar
Kom	0–3	Iskra
Podgorica	3–0	Igalo
Mornar	2–0	Petrovac
Dečić	1–1 (5–4 p)	Budućnost

=== Matches ===
7 September 2022	Jedinstvo	3–1	Mladost DG	Bijelo Polje
16:30 CEST	Idrizović 16'; Šćepanović 42'; Hajrović 58'	Report	N. Ivanović 12'	Stadium: Gradski stadion Attendance: 500; Referee: Nikola Cvijović

7 September 2022	Sutjeska	1–0	Jezero	Nikšić
16:30 CEST	Striković 5'	Report		Stadium: Gradski stadion Attendance: 400; Referee: Miloš Bešović

7 September 2022	Bokelj	2–3	Arsenal	Kotor
17:00 CEST	Alhassan 23'; Globarević 72'	Report	Muhović 64'; Došljak 68'; Montenegro 88'	Stadium: Stadion pod Vrmcem; Attendance: 500; Referee: Nikola Dabanović

7 September 2022	Zeta	1–3	Rudar	Golubovci
18:00 CEST	Vukčević 68'	Report	Burzanović 7'; Talović 25'; Zečević 39'	Stadium: Stadion Trešnjica; Attendance: 300; Referee: Miraš Cerović

7 September 2022	Kom	0–3	Iskra	Podgorica
18:00 CEST		Report	Pavlićević 27', 66'; Obradović 39'	Stadium: Stadion Zlatica; Attendance: 350; Referee: Vojin Vojinović

7 September 2022	Podgorica	3–0	Igalo	Podgorica
18:00 CEST	Maraš 59' (pen.); Habibović 82'; Tripković 90+3'	Report		Stadium: DG Arena; Attendance: 200; Referee: Vladimir Bjelica

7 September 2022	Mornar	2–0	Petrovac	Bar
19:00 CEST	Guzina 57'; Poček 87'	Report		Stadium: Stadion Topolica; Attendance: 700; Referee: Miloš Bošković

7 September 2022	Dečić	1–1 (5–4 p)	Budućnost	Tuzi
19:00 CEST	Bećiraj 40'	Report	Milošević 33'	Stadium: Stadion Tuško Polje; Attendance: 1,500; Referee: Miloš Savović
	Penalties
	Božović (penalty scored); Bećiraj (penalty scored); Denković (penalty scored); Tući (penalty scored); I. Ivanović (penalty scored)		(penalty missed) Ražnatović; (penalty scored) Simić; (penalty scored) M. Bakić; (penalty scored) Terzić; (penalty scored) Milošević

== Quarter-finals ==
Draw for the quarter-finals was held on 17 October 2022. The matches were played on 26 October 2022. Two of the four fixtures required a penalty shoot-out to determine a winner: Iskra got past Mornar, while Arsenal advanced at the expense of Jedinstvo, in each case by a 5–3 count on penalties.

=== Summary ===
Team 1	Score	Team 2
Iskra	1–1 (5–3 p)	Mornar
Dečić	2–0	Podgorica
Arsenal	0–0 (5–3 p)	Jedinstvo
Rudar	0–2	Sutjeska

=== Matches ===
26 October 2022	Arsenal	0–0 (5–3 p)	Jedinstvo	Radanovići
14:00 CEST		Report		Stadium: Stadion Donja Sutvara; Attendance: 300; Referee: Radoje Pajović

26 October 2022	Rudar	0–2	Sutjeska	Pljevlja
14:00 CEST		Report	Conraad 5' (pen.); Žižić 90+3'	Stadium: Gradski stadion Attendance: 800; Referee: Savo Vujović

26 October 2022	Dečić	2–0	Podgorica	Podgorica
15:00 CEST	Šofranac 3'; Cmiljanić 90+3'	Report		Stadium: Camp FSCG; Attendance: 400; Referee: Dalibor Vujisić

26 October 2022	Iskra	1–1 (5–3 p)	Mornar	Danilovgrad
16:00 CEST	Kojašević 64' (pen.)	Report	Vujačić 33'	Stadium: Braća Velašević Stadium; Attendance: 500; Referee: Nikola Vođević

== Semi-finals ==
Draw for the semi-finals was held on 10 April 2023. The semi-finals were played over two legs, on 19 April and 3 May 2023. Sutjeska beat last season's runners-up Dečić 3–1 in the first leg of their semi-final and drew 1–1 in the return leg to advance to the final with a 4–2 aggregate victory. The other semi-final saw Arsenal win 3–1 away against Iskra in the first leg, before losing by the same scoreline in the return match. The tie had to be settled by penalties, with Arsenal prevailing 4–1 in the shootout to reach the final.

=== Summary ===
Team 1	Agg.	Team 2	1st leg	2nd leg
Sutjeska	4–2	Dečić	3–1	1–1
Iskra	4–4 (1–4 p)	Arsenal	1–3	3–1

=== First legs ===
19 April 2023	Sutjeska	3–1	Dečić	Nikšić
18:00 CEST	Striković 34'; Conraad 69' (pen.); Pajović 84'	Report	Camaj 83'	Stadium: Gradski stadion Attendance: 1,000; Referee: Savo Vujović

19 April 2023	Iskra	1–3	Arsenal	Danilovgrad
18:00 CEST	Pavlićević 66'	Report	Bulatović 15', 39'; Muhović 49'	Stadium: Braća Velašević Stadium; Attendance: 800; Referee: Miloš Savović

=== Second legs ===
3 May 2023	Arsenal	1–3 (4–4 agg.) (4–1 p)	Iskra	Radanovići
16:30 CEST	Manojlović 90+4'	Report	Gjolaj 22'; Popović 28'; Pavlićević 73'	Stadium: Stadion Donja Sutvara; Attendance: 600; Referee: Radoje Pajović
	Penalties
	Rudović (penalty scored); Montenegro (penalty scored); Muhović (penalty scored); D. Bakić (penalty scored)		(penalty scored) Obradović; (penalty missed) Pavlićević; (penalty missed) Boljević

3 May 2023	Dečić	1–1 (2–4 agg.)	Sutjeska	Podgorica
18:00 CEST	Božović 52'	Report	Striković 32'	Stadium: DG Arena; Attendance: 1,000; Referee: Miloš Savović

== Final ==
The final required a penalty shootout to decide a winner after the game finished 1–1 and extra time produced no further goals. Sutjeska won the shootout to record their second Cup victory.

29 May 2023
20:30 CEST

Arsenal	1–1 (a.e.t.)	Sutjeska
Manojlović 27'	Report	Sahli 85'
Penalties
Rudović (penalty missed); D. Bakić (penalty scored); Muhović (penalty missed); Čelebić (penalty scored); Manojlović (penalty scored)	3–4	(penalty missed) Vučić; (penalty scored) Matanović; (penalty scored) Marković; (penalty scored) Vuković; (penalty scored) Sahli

Podgorica City Stadium, Podgorica
Attendance: 3,500
Referee: Miloš Savović

== See also ==
- Montenegrin Cup
- Montenegrin First League
