= 2021–22 Montenegrin Cup =

Tournament details
- Country: Montenegro
- Teams: 16

Final positions
- Champions: Budućnost (4th title)
- Runners-up: Dečić

Tournament statistics
- Matches played: 17
- Goals scored: 48 (2.82 per match)
- Top goal scorer(s): Viktor Đukanović (4 goals)

The 2021–22 Montenegrin Cup was the 16th season of the knockout football tournament in Montenegro. This season's cup was started on 27 October 2021. The winners of the cup this season earned a place in the first qualifying round of the 2022–23 UEFA Europa Conference League.

Budućnost was the defending champions from the previous season after defeating Dečić in the final by the score of 3–1.

== First round ==
Draw for the first round was held on 18 October 2021. The matches were played on 27 October 2021.

=== Summary ===
Team 1	Score	Team 2
Jezero	1–3	Budućnost
Kom	0–1	Iskra
Rudar	3–0	Arsenal
Bokelj	1–2	Sutjeska
Dečić	2–0	Petrovac
Igalo	0–0 (4–3 p)	Mornar
Podgorica	2–0	Zeta
OFK Titograd	1–0	Jedinstvo

=== Matches ===
27 October 2021	Jezero	1–3	Budućnost	Danilovgrad
14:00 CEST	Mendy 87'	Report	Adžić 2'; Đukanović 26'; Đuričković 73'	Stadium: Braća Velašević Stadium; Attendance: 500; Referee: Radoje Pajović

27 October 2021	Kom	0–1	Iskra	Podgorica
14:00 CEST		Report	Willian 42'	Stadium: Stadion Zlatica; Attendance: 200; Referee: Nikola Dabanović

27 October 2021	Rudar	3–0	Arsenal	Pljevlja
14:00 CEST	Suraka 12', 29'; Vučićević 53'	Report		Stadium: Gradski stadion Attendance: 300; Referee: Savo Vujović

27 October 2021	Bokelj	1–2	Sutjeska	Kotor
14:00 CEST	Rudović 35'	Report	Bubanja 3'; Marković 55'	Stadium: Stadion pod Vrmcem; Attendance: 1,000; Referee: Nikola Cvijović

27 October 2021	Dečić	2–0	Petrovac	Tuzi
14:00 CEST	Camaj 32'; Vulaj 61'	Report		Stadium: Stadion Tuško Polje; Attendance: 400; Referee: Dalibor Vujisić

27 October 2021	Igalo	0–0 (4–3 p)	Mornar	Igalo
14:00 CEST		Report		Stadium: Stadion Solila; Attendance: 200; Referee: Miraš Cerović
	Penalties
	Koprivica (penalty scored); Đurković (penalty scored); Vlahović (penalty scored); Cordoba (penalty scored)		(penalty missed) Vukmarković; (penalty scored) Kajević; (penalty scored) Radović; (penalty scored) Marveggio; (penalty missed) Ćetković

27 October 2021	Podgorica	2–0	Zeta	Podgorica
14:00 CEST	Sentoku 31'; Đajić 58'	Report		Stadium: DG Arena; Attendance: 300; Referee: Vladimir Bjelica

27 October 2021	OFK Titograd	1–0	Jedinstvo	Podgorica
14:00 CEST	Šušić 78'	Report		Stadium: Mladost Stadium; Attendance: 100; Referee: Dejan Marković

== Quarter-finals ==
Draw for the quarter-finals was held on 15 November 2021. The matches were played on 24 November 2021.

=== Summary ===
Team 1	Score	Team 2
Budućnost	2–0	Rudar
Sutjeska	4–0	Podgorica
Iskra	2–0	Igalo
OFK Titograd	0–2	Dečić

=== Matches ===
24 November 2021	Iskra	2–0	Igalo	Danilovgrad
13:00 CET	Milojko 30'; Yamamoto 42'	Report		Stadium: Braća Velašević Stadium; Attendance: 300; Referee: Nikola Vođević

24 November 2021	Sutjeska	4–0	Podgorica	Nikšić
13:00 CET	Drinčić 39'; Marušić 62'; Raičević 78'; Eraković 87'	Report		Stadium: Gradski stadion Attendance: 700; Referee: Vojin Vojinović

24 November 2021	OFK Titograd	0–2	Dečić	Podgorica
14:00 CET		Report	Camaj 53', 79'	Stadium: Mladost Stadium; Attendance: 300; Referee: Miraš Cerović

24 November 2021	Budućnost	2–0	Rudar	Podgorica
17:00 CET	Đuričković 42'; Đukanović 45'	Report		Stadium: Podgorica City Stadium; Attendance: 1,000; Referee: Miloš Bošković

== Semi-finals ==
Draw for the semi-finals was held on 11 April 2022. The semi-finals were played from 20 April to 4 May 2022.

=== Summary ===
Team 1	Agg.	Team 2	1st leg	2nd leg
Budućnost	5–1	Sutjeska	3–0	2–1
Iskra	2–3	Dečić	1–1	1–2

=== First legs ===
20 April 2022	Iskra	1–1	Dečić	Danilovgrad
16:00 CEST	Perović 38' (pen.)	Report	Martinović 61'	Stadium: Braća Velašević Stadium; Attendance: 500; Referee: Nikola Vođević

20 April 2022	Budućnost	3–0	Sutjeska	Podgorica
18:00 CEST	Đukanović 39'; Terzić 44'; Mijović 68'	Report		Stadium: Podgorica City Stadium; Attendance: 2,500; Referee: Nikola Dabanović

=== Second legs ===
4 May 2022	Dečić	2–1 (3–2 agg.)	Iskra	Tuzi
17:00 CEST	Nikolić 71'; Janketić 76'	Report	Šahman 60'	Stadium: Stadion Tuško Polje; Attendance: 1,000; Referee: Nikola Dabanović

4 May 2022	Sutjeska	1–2 (1–5 agg.)	Budućnost	Nikšić
19:00 CEST	Knežević 6'	Report	Đukanović 31'; Raičković 49' (pen.)	Stadium: Gradski stadion Attendance: 1,000; Referee: Nikola Vođević

== Final ==
29 May 2022
20:30 CEST

Budućnost	1–0	Dečić
Ćuković 9'	Report

Podgorica City Stadium, Podgorica
Attendance: 5,000
Referee: Nikola Dabanović

== See also ==
- Montenegrin Cup
- Montenegrin First League
