= 2020–21 Montenegrin Cup =

Tournament details
- Country: Montenegro
- Teams: 16

Final positions
- Champions: Budućnost (3rd title)
- Runners-up: Dečić

Tournament statistics
- Matches played: 17
- Goals scored: 57 (3.35 per match)
- Top goal scorer: Lazar Mijović (4 goals)

The 2020–21 Montenegrin Cup was the 15th season of the knockout football tournament in Montenegro. This season's cup began on 21 October 2020. The winners of the cup this season earned a place in the first qualifying round of a new competition, the 2021–22 UEFA Europa Conference League.

The previous season's cup was abandoned due to the COVID-19 pandemic in Montenegro.

== First round ==
Draw for the first round was held on 15 October 2020. Eight first round matches were played on 21 October 2020.

=== Summary ===
Team 1	Score	Team 2
Grbalj	0–4	Arsenal
Bokelj	3–0	Kom
Iskra	3–0	OFK Titograd
Petrovac	1–5	Dečić
Budućnost	3–1	Rudar
Podgorica	2–0	Jezero
Zeta	8–0	Ibar
Sutjeska	3–0	Jedinstvo

=== Matches ===
21 October 2020	Grbalj	0–4	Arsenal	Radanovići
14:00 CEST		Report	Pepić 16'; Batuta 22'; Krgović 47'; Delić 64'	Stadium: Stadion Donja Sutvara; Referee: Miloš Bešović

21 October 2020	Bokelj	3–0	Kom	Kotor
14:00 CEST	Guzina 74', 85'; Čađenović 90+1'	Report		Stadium: Stadion pod Vrmcem; Referee: Marko Ćupić

21 October 2020	Petrovac	1–5	Dečić	Petrovac
14:00 CEST	Savić 66'	Report	An. Rudović 9', 14', 77'; Vulaj 80'; Pešukić 87'	Stadium: Stadion pod Malim brdom Referee: Vladimir Bjelica

21 October 2020	Budućnost	3–1	Rudar	Podgorica
14:00 CEST	Ćuković 5'; Grbić 37'; Božović 79'	Report	Gogić 90+2'	Stadium: Pomoćni teren FK Budućnost; Referee: Nikola Vođević

21 October 2020	Sutjeska	3–0	Jedinstvo	Nikšić
15:00 CEST	Adrović 3', 41'; Osmajić 67'	Report		Stadium: Gradski stadion Referee: Miloš Savović

21 October 2020	Zeta	8–0	Ibar	Golubovci
16:00 CEST	Ceklić 11'; Nya-Vedji 13'; Kalezić 25', 64'; Burzanović 29'; Vukčević 41'; Popović 69'; Ajković 82'	Report		Stadium: Stadion Trešnjica; Referee: Aleksandar Šćekić

21 October 2020	Podgorica	2–0	Jezero	Podgorica
17:00 CEST	Vujović 49'; Muharemović 63'	Report		Stadium: DG Arena; Referee: Vojin Vojinović

21 October 2020	Iskra	3–0	OFK Titograd	Danilovgrad
18:00 CEST	Šaletić 13'; Milić 28'; Petrović 29'	Report		Stadium: Braća Velašević Stadium; Referee: Miraš Cerović

== Quarter-finals ==
Draw for the quarter-finals was held on 16 November 2020. Four quarter-final matches were played on 25 November 2020.

=== Summary ===
Team 1	Score	Team 2
Bokelj	0–6	Budućnost
Arsenal	0–1	Iskra
Podgorica	2–3	Zeta
Dečić	1–0	Sutjeska

=== Matches ===
25 November 2020	Bokelj	0–6	Budućnost	Kotor
13:00 CET		Report	Janketić 19'; Vujačić 22', 60'; Raičković 36'; Đukanović 86'	Stadium: Stadion pod Vrmcem; Referee: Miloš Savović

25 November 2020	Arsenal	0–1	Iskra	Tivat
13:00 CET		Report	Vuković 3'	Stadium: Stadion u Parku; Referee: Miloš Bošković

25 November 2020	Dečić	1–0	Sutjeska	Tuzi
13:00 CET	Ad. Rudović 77'	Report		Stadium: Stadion Tuško Polje; Referee: Nikola Dabanović

25 November 2020	Podgorica	2–3	Zeta	Podgorica
14:00 CET	Ukšanović 45+2'; Kordić 87'	Report	Simović 33'; Lambulić 65'; Burzanović 90+1'	Stadium: DG Arena; Referee: Radoje Pajović

== Semi-finals ==
Draw for the semi-finals was held on 12 April 2021. The semi-finals were played from 21 April to 5 May 2021.

=== Summary ===
Team 1	Agg.	Team 2	1st leg	2nd leg
Zeta	2–4	Budućnost	2–1	0–3
Iskra	0–1	Dečić	0–0	0–1

=== First legs ===
21 April 2021	Zeta	2–1	Budućnost	Golubovci
17:30 CEST	Lambulić 20'; Kalezić 40'	Report	Mijović 5'	Stadium: Stadion Trešnjica; Referee: Mileta Šćepanović

21 April 2021	Iskra	0–0	Dečić	Danilovgrad
19:30 CEST		Report		Stadium: Braća Velašević Stadium; Referee: Miloš Bošković

=== Second legs ===
5 May 2021	Budućnost	3–0 (4–2 agg.)	Zeta	Podgorica
18:00 CEST	Božović 33' (pen.); Mijović 79'; Terzić 86'	Report		Stadium: Podgorica City Stadium; Referee: Mileta Šćepanović

5 May 2021	Dečić	1–0 (1–0 agg.)	Iskra	Tuzi
20:00 CEST	Pešukić 51'	Report		Stadium: Stadion Tuško Polje; Referee: Predrag Radovanović

== Final ==
30 May 2021
20:30 CEST

Dečić	1–3	Budućnost
Pešukić 38'	Report	Vučić 3'; Mijović 28'; Ivanović 90'

Podgorica City Stadium, Podgorica
Attendance: 1,200
Referee: Mileta Šćepanović

== See also ==
- Montenegrin Cup
- Montenegrin First League
