= Miloš Dragojević =

Montenegrin footballer

Personal information
- Date of birth: 3 February 1989 (age 37)
- Place of birth: Titograd, SR Montenegro, SFR Yugoslavia
- Height: 1.90 m (6 ft 3 in)
- Position: Goalkeeper

Team information
- Current team: Dečić
- Number: 33

Youth career
- –2008: Budućnost

Senior career*
Years	Team	Apps	(Gls)
2008–2012	Budućnost	26	(0)
2008–2009	→ Mladost (loan)		
2009–2010	→ Bratstvo Cijevna (loan)	2	(0)
2012–2013	Widzew Łódź	7	(0)
2013–2014	Mladost	14	(0)
2014–2015	OFK Beograd	0	(0)
2015	Pelister	14	(0)
2016	Petrovac	13	(0)
2016–	Budućnost	144	(0)
2023–2024	→ Mladost DG (loan)	13	(0)
2024	→ Otrant Olympic (loan)	13	(0)
2025	Mornar	8	(0)
2025–	Dečić	23	(0)

International career^{‡}
2008–2010	Montenegro U21	3	(0)
2021–	Montenegro	2	(0)
- * Club domestic league appearances and goals as of 17 June 2026 ‡ National team caps and goals as of 19 April 2023

Miloš Dragojević (Serbian Cyrillic: Милош Драгојевић; born 3 February 1989) is a Montenegrin professional footballer who plays as a goalkeeper for Mornar on loan from Budućnost and the Montenegro national team.

== Club career ==
Born in Titograd (former name of Podgorica), he played with FK Budućnost Podgorica in the Montenegrin First League before signing with Polish Ekstraklasa side Widzew Łódź in 2012. After one season in Poland, he returned to Montenegro and played with FK Mladost Podgorica. In summer 2014 he moved abroad again, this time to join Serbian SuperLiga side OFK Beograd.

== International career ==
Dragojević made 3 appearances for Montenegro U21 side between 2008 and 2010. He made his debut for the Montenegro national team in a friendly 0–0 tie with Bosnia and Herzegovina on 2 June 2021.

== Honours ==
Budućnost Podgorica

- Montenegrin First League: 2007–08, 2011–12, 2016–17, 2019–20, 2020–21, 2022–23
- Montenegrin Cup: 2018–19, 2020–21, 2021–22
