= Viktor Đukanović =

Montenegrin footballer

Personal information
- Date of birth: 29 January 2004 (age 22)
- Place of birth: Nikšić, Serbia and Montenegro
- Height: 1.84 m (6 ft 0 in)
- Position: Winger

Team information
- Current team: ETO Győr (on loan from Hammarby IF)

Youth career
- Sutjeska Nikšić
- Budućnost Podgorica

Senior career*
Years	Team	Apps	(Gls)
2020–2023	Budućnost Podgorica	68	(12)
2023–	Hammarby IF	37	(13)
2024–2025	→ Standard Liège (loan)	4	(0)
2025–2026	→ DAC Dunajská Streda (loan)	33	(12)
2026–	→ ETO Győr (loan)	11	(4)

International career^{‡}
2020	Montenegro U17	9	(4)
2021–2022	Montenegro U19	6	(3)
2021–	Montenegro U21	5	(3)
2022–	Montenegro	11	(1)
- * Club domestic league appearances and goals as of 28 October 2026 ‡ National team caps and goals as of 8 October 2026

Viktor Đukanović (born 29 January 2004) is a Montenegrin professional footballer who plays as a winger for Hungarian First League club ETO Győr, on loan from Allsvenskan club Hammarby IF, and the Montenegro national team.

== Club career ==
=== Budućnost ===
Đukanović started his youth career with Sutjeska Nikšić prior to moving to Budućnost Podgorica. On 29 November 2020, he scored in his senior debut for the club at just 16 years old, coming on as a substitute in a 4–2 win against Rudar Pljevlja. In his debut season, he helped Budućnost finish first in the 2020–21 Montenegrin League title race and the 2021 Montenegrin Cup, making 23 competitive appearances and scoring three goals.

In the 2021–22 season, Đukanović established himself as a regular starter, starting 21 games and making 31 league appearances in total, scoring nine league goals. He also made his European debut in the 2021–22 UEFA Champions League qualifying rounds against HJK Helsinki, although Budućnost lost 7–1 on aggregate. Overall, Đukanović scored 13 goals in 38 appearances, contributing to the club's runner-up finish at the end of the 2021–22 season and the 2022 Montenegrin Cup win.

In 2022–23, his last season before leaving the club, Đukanović scored a brace against Llapi in the 2022–23 Conference League qualification phase, after which Budućnost was eliminated by Breiðablik. On 26 December 2022, Đukanović won the award Most Promising Player of the Year in the Montenegrin First League. He also finished third for the overall Player of the Year award, behind Novica Eraković from Sutjeska and Draško Božović from Dečić.

=== Hammarby ===
On 6 January 2023, Đukanović signed a five-year contract with Swedish club Hammarby IF. The transfer fee was reportedly set at around €1 million, potential bonuses included. Throughout his debut season, Đukanović scored 11 goals in 25 league appearances, although Hammarby disappointedly finished 7th in the table, making him the first teenager to score at least ten goals in an Allsvenskan season since AIK's Alexander Isak in 2016.

==== Loan to Standard Liège ====
Đukanović signed for Belgian Pro League team Standard Liège on a loan with an option to buy deal on 30 July 2024.

==== Loan to DAC Dunajská Streda ====
On 4 February 2025, Đukanović moved on a new loan to DAC Dunajská Streda in Slovakia until the end of 2025, with an option to buy.

==== Loan to ETO Győr ====
On 17 July 2026, Đukanović moved on a new loan to ETO Győr in Hungary until the end of 2027, with an option to buy.

== International career ==
Đukanović has played for Montenegro's U17, U19, U21 and senior teams. He made his debut for the U17 team in a 2–1 loss to Bosnia & Herzegovina. He made nine appearances and scored four goals for the U17 side. As a U19 player, he made three appearances; he subsequently scored two goals in two appearances for the U21 selection.

On 14 June 2022, Đukanović made his senior national team appearance as a late substitute in a UEFA Nations League 3–0 win against Romania.

== Career statistics ==
=== Club ===
As of match played 4 October 2025

Appearances and goals by club, season and competition
Club	Season	Division	League		National cup		League cup		Continental		Total	
Club	Season	Division	Apps	Goals	Apps	Goals	Apps	Goals	Apps	Goals	Apps	Goals
Budućnost Podgorica	2020–21	Montenegrin First League	20	2	3	1	0	0	0	0	23	3
Budućnost Podgorica	2021–22	Montenegrin First League	31	9	4	4	0	0	3 (Note: 1 appearance in UEFA Champions League & 2 appearances in UEFA Europa Conference League)	0	38	13
Budućnost Podgorica	2022–23	Montenegrin First League	17	1	0	0	0	0	4 (Note: Appearances in UEFA Europa Conference League)	2	21	3
Budućnost Podgorica	Total		68	12	7	5	0	0	7	2	82	19
Hammarby IF	2023	Allsvenskan	25	11	6	2	0	0	2	0	33	13
Hammarby IF	2024	Allsvenskan	12	2	3	0	0	0	0	0	15	2
Hammarby IF	Total		37	13	9	2	0	0	2	0	48	15
Standard Liège (loan)	2024–25	Belgian Pro League	4	0	1	0	0	0	0	0	5	0
Dunajská Streda (loan)	2024–25	Slovak First League	14	3	0	0	0	0	0	0	14	3
Dunajská Streda (loan)	2025–26	Slovak First League	9	6	1	1	0	0	0	0	10	7
ETO Győr (loan)	2026–27	Nemzeti Bajnokság I	0	0	0	0	0	0	0	0	0	0
Career total			132	34	18	8	0	0	9	2	157	44

=== International ===
As of match played 26 March 2024

Appearances and goals by national team and year
National team	Year	Apps	Goals
Montenegro	2022	1	0
Montenegro	2023	2	0
Montenegro	2024	1	0
Total		4	0

Scores and results list Uruguay's goal tally first, score column indicates score after each Đukanović goal.

List of international goals scored by Viktor Đukanović
No.	Date	Venue	Opponent	Score	Result	Competition
1.	13 October 2025	Podgorica City Stadium, Podgorica, Montenegro	Liechtenstein	2–1	2–1	Friendly

== Honours ==
=== Budućnost ===
- Montenegrin First League (1): 2020–21
- Montenegrin Cup (2): 2020–21, 2021–22
