= Adrijan Rudović =

Montenegrin footballer (born 1995)

Personal information
- Full name: Adrijan Rudović
- Date of birth: 10 June 1995 (age 31)
- Place of birth: Montenegro, FR Yugoslavia
- Height: 1.87 m (6 ft 2 in)
- Position: Centre-back

Team information
- Current team: Prishtina e Re
- Number: 4

Youth career
- –2016: Otrant-Olympic

Senior career*
Years	Team	Apps	(Gls)
2016	Tërbuni	8	(0)
2016–2017	Otrant-Olympic	40	(0)
2018	Panserraikos	?	(?)
2018	Otrant-Olympic	28	(0)
2019	Liria	2	(0)
2019	Petrovac	5	(0)
2020	Bokelj	9	(1)
2020–2022	Dečić	51	(1)
2022–2024	Sutjeska	22	(0)
2024–2025	Kuala Lumpur City	20	(0)
2025–	Prishtina e Re	25	(0)
- * Club domestic league appearances and goals as of 22 June 2026

Adrijan Rudović (Albanian: Adrian Rudaj; born 10 June 1995) is a Montenegrin professional footballer who plays as a centre-back for Kosovan club Prishtina e Re.

== Club career ==
=== FK Dečić ===
Rudović joined Montenegrin side FK Dečić in July 2020. Over the 2020–21 season, he quickly became a regular starter, making 33 league appearances (2,970 minutes) and scoring one goal. In the following 2021–22 season, he added 18 league appearances. Rudović made his UEFA Conference League debut in the 2021–22 season, playing one match against Drita and completing the full 90 minutes.

=== Sutjeska ===
In 2022, Rudović signed with Sutjeska Nikšić, one of the top clubs in the Montenegrin First League. He made his UEFA Champions League debut on 5 July 2022, starting in the first qualifying round match against Ludogorets Razgrad. Rudović spent two seasons with Sutjeska, playing during the 2022–23 and 2023–24 campaigns, making a total of 22 league appearances.

=== Kuala Lumpur City ===
On 28 April 2024, Rudović was announced as a new signing for Kuala Lumpur City ahead of the 2024–25 Malaysia Super League season.

== Career statistics ==
=== Club ===
As of 21 June 2025

Club	Season	League			Cup (Note: Appearances in Albanian Cup, Montenegro Cup & Malaysia FA Cup)		League Cup (Note: Appearances in Malaysia Cup)		Continental		Other		Total	
Club	Season	Division	Apps	Goals	Apps	Goals	Apps	Goals	Apps	Goals	Apps	Goals	Apps	Goals
Tërbuni	2015–16	Abissnet Superiore	8	0	3	0	—		—		—		11	0
Otrant-Olympic	2016–17	2. CFL	25	0	1	0	—		—		—		26	0
Otrant-Olympic	2017–18	2. CFL	15	0	2	0	—		—		—		17	0
Otrant-Olympic	2018–19	2. CFL	28	0	1	0	—		—		—		29	0
Otrant-Olympic	Total		68	0	4	0	—		—		—		72	0
Liria	2018–19	Superleague of Kosovo	2	0	0	0	—		—		—		2	0
Petrovac	2019–20	1. CFL	5	0	1	0	—		—		—		6	0
Bokelj	2019–20	2. CFL	9	1	0	0	—		—		2 (Note: Appearances in Montenegrin First League playoffs)	0	11	1
Dečić	2020–21	1. CFL	33	1	5	1	—		—		—		38	2
Dečić	2021–22	1. CFL	18	0	1	0	—		1 (Note: Appearances in Conference League Qualifier)	0	—		20	0
Dečić	Total		51	1	6	1	—		1	0	—		58	2
Sutjeska	2022–23	1. CFL	4	0	0	0	—		2 (Note: Appearances in UCL Qualifier)	0	2 (Note: Appearances in Conference League Qualifier)	0	8	0
Sutjeska	2023–24	1. CFL	18	0	1	0	—		1 (Note: Appearances in Conference League Qualifier)	0	—		20	0
Sutjeska	Total		22	0	1	0	—		3	0	2	0	28	0
Kuala Lumpur City	2024–25	Malaysia Super League	20	0	1	0	4	0	5 (Note: Appearances in ASEAN Club Championship)	1	—		30	1
