= Velizar Janketić =

Montenegrin footballer

Personal information
- Date of birth: 15 November 1996 (age 29)
- Place of birth: Podgorica, FR Yugoslavia
- Height: 1.77 m (5 ft 10 in)
- Position: Attacking midfielder

Team information
- Current team: Bokelj
- Number: 7

Youth career
- –2015: Budućnost

Senior career*
Years	Team	Apps	(Gls)
2015–2017	Budućnost	23	(1)
2015–2016	→ Grafičar (loan)		
2017–2018	Kom Podgorica	18	(1)
2018–2019	Rudar Pljevlja	24	(1)
2019	Petrovac	10	(0)
2019–2020	Rudar Pljevlja	25	(9)
2020–2021	Budućnost	13	(0)
2021–2023	Dečić	33	(3)
2023	Rudar Pljevlja	16	(7)
2023–2024	Igman Konjic	28	(2)
2024	Sloboda Tuzla	7	(1)
2025–	Bokelj	38	(6)

International career^{‡}
2016–2018	Montenegro U21	4	(1)
- * Club domestic league appearances and goals as of 25 May 2026 ‡ National team caps and goals as of 27 March 2018

Velizar Janketić (born 15 November 1996) is a Montenegrin professional footballer who plays as an attacking midfielder for Montenegrin First League club Bokelj.

== Club career ==
=== Rudar Pljevlja ===
In January 2023, Janketić returned to Rudar Pljevlja for the third time. Janketić left the club in summer of 2023.

=== Igman Konjic ===
Janketić signed a contract with Bosnian Premier League club Igman Konjic in June 2023. On 8 October 2023, he made his debut in a league match against Sloga Meridian.

== Career statistics ==
=== Club ===
As of match played 10 December 2023

Appearances and goals by club, season and competition
Club	Season	League			National cup		Europe		Total	
Club	Season	League	Apps	Goals	Apps	Goals	Apps	Goals	Apps	Goals
Budućnost	2015–16	1.CFL	6	0	1	0	0	0	7	0
Budućnost	2016–17	1.CFL	17	1	4	1	4 (Note: Appearance(s) in UEFA Europa League)	1	31	0
Budućnost	Total		23	1	5	1	4	1	32	3
Kom Podgorica	2017–18	1.CFL	18	1	0	0	0	0	18	1
Rudar Pljevlja	2017–18	1.CFL	13	1	0	0	0	0	13	1
Rudar Pljevlja	2018–19	1.CFL	11	0	0	0	2 (Note: Appearance(s) in UEFA Europa League)	0	13	0
Rudar Pljevlja	Total		34	1	0	0	2	0	36	1
Petrovac	2018–19	1.CFL	10	0	0	0	0	0	10	0
Rudar Pljevlja	2019–20	1.CFL	25	9	3	0	0	0	28	9
Budućnost	2020–21	1.CFL	13	0	0	0	0	0	13	0
Dečić	2021–22	1.CFL	27	3	1	0	2 (Note: Appearance(s) in UEFA Europa Conference League)	0	30	3
Dečić	2022–23	1.CFL	6	0	0	0	1 (Note: Appearance(s) in UEFA Europa Conference League)	0	13	0
Dečić	Total		33	3	1	0	3	0	37	3
Rudar Pljevlja	2022–23	1.CFL	18	8	0	0	0	0	18	8
Igman Konjic	2023–24	Bosnian Premier League	14	0	1	0	0	0	15	0
Career total			188	23	10	1	9	1	207	25

== Honours ==
Budućnost Podgorica

- 1.CFL: 2016–17, 2020–21
- Montenegrin Cup: 2021
