= Vladan Adžić =

Montenegrin footballer (born 1987)

Personal information
- Date of birth: 5 July 1987 (age 39)
- Place of birth: Cetinje, SR Montenegro, SFR Yugoslavia
- Height: 1.92 m (6 ft 3 1/2 in)
- Position: Centre-back

Team information
- Current team: Budućnost
- Number: 33

Senior career*
Years	Team	Apps	(Gls)
2005–2006	Bokelj	8	(0)
2006–2008	Lovćen		
2008–2012	Rudar Pljevlja	74	(5)
2012–2014	OFK Beograd	33	(2)
2014–2017	Suwon FC	88	(3)
2018	Budućnost	21	(0)
2019	Pohang Steelers	3	(0)
2019	Varaždin	12	(0)
2020–	Budućnost	111	(3)

International career^{‡}
2020–	Montenegro	1	(0)
- * Club domestic league appearances and goals as of 1 June 2025 ‡ National team caps and goals as of 7 October 2020

Vladan Adžić (Serbian Cyrillic: Владан Аџић; born 5 July 1987) is a Montenegrin professional footballer who plays as a centre-back for Budućnost.

== Club career ==
Born in Cetinje, Adžić made his senior debut with FK Bokelj in the 2005–06 Second League of Serbia and Montenegro. During the winter break he moved to FK Lovćen where he played until summer 2008 afterwards joining FK Rudar Pljevlja. With Rudar, he played for 4 consecutive seasons in the Montenegrin First League, becoming a champion in 2009–10 and runner-up in 2009–10. He also won the Montenegrin Cup on both those seasons, 2009 and 2010, beside being runner-up in 2012.

=== OFK Beograd ===
In August 2012 he moved abroad to Serbia by joining OFK Beograd. He made his debut in the 2012–13 Serbian SuperLiga on 19 August 2012, in a second round match against FK Jagodina. On 25 January 2013, during the half-time of a friendly match with his former club Rudar, he took a bottle of transparent-liquid thinking it was water, and subsequently threw up when his body reacted to alcoholic rakia.

== International career ==
Adžić has received a call for the Montenegrin national team on several occasions. He made his debut on 7 October 2020 in a friendly against Latvia.

== Honours ==
Rudar Pljevlja

- Montenegrin First League: 2009–10
- Montenegrin Cup: 2009–10, 2010–11

Budućnost Podgorica

- Montenegrin First League: 2019–20, 2020–21, 2022–23
- Montenegrin Cup: 2020–21, 2021–22, 2023–24
