= Marko Mrvaljević =

Montenegrin footballer (born 2001)

Personal information
- Date of birth: 5 July 2001 (age 25)
- Place of birth: Montenegro
- Height: 1.88 m (6 ft 2 in)
- Position: Forward

Team information
- Current team: Sutjeska
- Number: 99

Youth career
- –2020: Budućnost

Senior career*
Years	Team	Apps	(Gls)
2019–2023	Budućnost	75	(13)
2020	→ OFK Titograd (loan)	16	(5)
2022	→ Podgorica (loan)	19	(0)
2022	→ Mladost (loan)	4	(3)
2024–2026	Veres Rivne	27	(6)
2025	→ ŁKS Łódź (loan)	15	(3)
2025	→ Mura (loan)	4	(0)
2026–	Sutjeska	15	(5)

International career
2019	Montenegro U19	7	(1)
2020	Montenegro U21	2	(0)
- * Club domestic league appearances and goals as of 17 June 2026

Marko Mrvaljević (Montenegrin: Марко Мрваљевић; born 5 July 2001) is a Montenegrin professional footballer who plays as a forward for Sutjeska.

== Early life ==
Mrvaljević was born on 5 July 2001 in Montenegro. Growing up, he regarded Sweden international Zlatan Ibrahimović as his football idol.

== Club career ==
As a youth player, Mrvaljević joined the youth academy of Montenegrin side Budućnost and was promoted to the club's senior team in 2019, where he made seventy-five league appearances and scored thirteen goals and helped them win the league title and the 2020–21 Montenegrin Cup. Ahead of the 2020–21 season, he was sent on loan to Montenegrin side OFK Titograd, where he made sixteen league appearances and scored five goals.

Eighteen months later, he was sent on loan to Montenegrin side Podgorica, where he made nineteen league appearances and scored zero goals, before being sent on loan to Montenegrin side Mladost in 2020, where he made four league appearances and scored three goals. Following his stint there, he signed for Ukrainian side Veres in 2024.

Subsequently, he was sent on loan to Polish side ŁKS Łódź in 2025, where he made fifteen league appearances and scored three goals. Polish news website wrote in 2025 that he "rarely excelled with the ball at his feet, often made simple technical errors, and occasionally stole the ball from opponents" while playing for the club.

On 18 August 2025, Mrvaljević joined Slovenian club Mura on a season-long loan. He made four goalless league appearances before returning to Veres at the end of the year. On 4 January 2026, his contract was terminated by mutual consent.

== International career ==
Mrvaljević was a Montenegro youth international. During October 2020, he played for the Montenegro under-21 national team in the 2021 UEFA European Under-21 Championship qualification.

== Honours ==
Budućnost

- Montenegrin First League: 2019–20, 2020–21, 2022–23
- Montenegrin Cup: 2020–21
