= 2021–22 Montenegrin First League =

Montenegrin First League
- Season: 2021–22
- Dates: 24 July 2021 – 24 May 2022
- Champions: Sutjeska; 5th title
- Relegated: Podgorica; Zeta
- Champions League: Sutjeska
- Europa Conference League: Budućnost; Dečić; Iskra
- Matches: 180
- Goals: 477 (2.65 per match)
- Top goalscorer: Adnan Bašić (14 goals)
- Biggest home win: Budućnost 6–0 Petrovac (24 May 2022)
- Biggest away win: Podgorica 1–5 Budućnost (24 April 2022); Zeta 0–4 Sutjeska (2 August 2021)
- Highest scoring: Dečić 4–4 Petrovac (28 November 2021)

The 2021–22 Montenegrin First League was the 16th season of the first tier association football in the country of Montenegro. The season began on 24 July 2021 and ended on 24 May 2022. The winners of the league qualified for a place in the 2022–23 UEFA Champions League.

Budućnost were the defending champions having won the league in the previous season.

== Teams ==
2021–22 clubs

OFK Titograd (relegated after eleven years in the top flight) were relegated after finishing tenth in the previous season. Mornar (promoted after a two-year absence) will replace them in the league after earning promotion from the Montenegrin Second League as league champions in the previous season.

Team	City	Stadium	Capacity	Kit manufacturer	Coach
Budućnost	Podgorica	Stadion pod Goricom	15,230	(Germany) Adidas	(Montenegro) Aleksandar Nedović
Dečić	Tuzi	Stadion Tuško Polje	2,000	(Serbia) Seven	(Serbia) Vladimir Janković
Iskra	Danilovgrad	Braća Velašević Stadium	2,500	(Spain) Joma	(Montenegro) Goran Jovanović
Jezero	Plav	Stadion Pod Racinom	2,500	(United States) Nike	(Montenegro) Mladen Lambulić
Mornar	Bar	Stadion Topolica	2,500	(Serbia) Seven	(Montenegro) Andrija Delibašić
Petrovac	Petrovac	Stadion Mitar Mićo Goliš	1,630	(Italy) Macron	(Montenegro) Nikola Rakojević
FK Podgorica	Podgorica	DG Arena	4,300	(Spain) Joma	(Montenegro) Vojislav Pejović
Rudar	Pljevlja	Stadion pod Golubinjom	5,140	(Germany) Adidas	(Montenegro) Srđan Nikić
Sutjeska	Nikšić	Stadion kraj Bistrice	5,214	(Spain) Joma	(Montenegro) Milija Savović
Zeta	Golubovci	Stadion Trešnjica	4,000	(England) A&A Sports	(Montenegro) Dragoljub Đuretić

== League table ==
Pos	Team	Pld	W	D	L	GF	GA	GD	Pts	Qualification or relegation
1	Sutjeska (C)	36	22	9	5	64	29	+35	75	Qualification for the Champions League first qualifying round
2	Budućnost	36	20	7	9	78	45	+33	67	Qualification for the Europa Conference League first qualifying round
3	Dečić	36	15	11	10	54	44	+10	56	Qualification for the Europa Conference League first qualifying round
4	Iskra	36	15	6	15	48	45	+3	51	Qualification for the Europa Conference League first qualifying round
5	Mornar	36	13	11	12	35	39	−4	50	
6	Jezero	36	14	6	16	42	46	−4	48	
7	Petrovac	36	10	13	13	47	60	−13	43	
8	Rudar (O)	36	9	9	18	35	56	−21	36	Qualification for the relegation play-offs
9	Podgorica (R)	36	8	10	18	38	61	−23	34 (Note: Podgorica finished ahead of Zeta on head-to-head points: Podgorica 7 points, Zeta 4 points.)	Qualification for the relegation play-offs
10	Zeta (R)	36	8	10	18	36	52	−16	34	Relegation to the Second League

Source: Football Association of Montenegro (in Montenegrin), Soccerway
Rules for classification: 1) Points; 2) Head-to-head points; 3) Head-to-head goal difference; 4) Head-to-head goals scored; 5) Goal difference; 6) Goals scored; 7) Draw.
(C) Champions; (O) Play-off winners; (R) Relegated

== Results ==
Clubs were scheduled to play each other four times for a total of 36 matches each.

Home \ Away	BUD	DEČ	ISK	JEZ	MOR	PET	POD	RUD	SUT	ZET	BUD	DEČ	ISK	JEZ	MOR	PET	POD	RUD	SUT	ZET
Budućnost	—	1–2	4–1	0–1	1–1	2–1	2–1	3–0	3–3	5–1	—	1–2	4–2	1–2	2–1	6–0	2–1	2–0	4–2	2–1
Dečić	2–2	—	1–1	2–0	0–1	4–4	2–2	3–0	1–1	2–0	0–2	—	2–1	1–2	4–0	2–1	1–2	1–2	1–2	1–0
Iskra	2–1	0–1	—	2–0	0–1	4–1	4–2	1–0	0–0	3–1	3–2	0–1	—	0–1	1–0	2–0	2–0	3–1	0–3	0–2
Jezero	1–2	0–0	1–0	—	0–0	1–2	1–2	2–4	0–2	2–1	2–1	4–2	3–1	—	1–2	0–1	4–0	3–2	0–2	0–0
Mornar	0–3	1–2	0–1	1–0	—	0–0	3–1	0–1	0–2	2–2	0–2	2–1	1–1	1–1	—	1–1	2–2	2–0	0–2	1–0
Petrovac	2–3	3–2	0–1	2–0	0–1	—	2–1	4–3	3–0	2–2	0–2	0–0	0–4	2–1	2–0	—	1–1	1–1	1–1	2–4
Podgorica	1–2	1–1	0–0	1–0	1–1	1–3	—	0–1	1–2	0–0	1–5	3–3	3–2	0–1	1–3	2–2	—	2–1	0–1	1–0
Rudar	1–1	1–1	0–0	2–2	2–1	2–2	0–1	—	0–1	2–0	3–1	1–0	0–3	1–3	0–0	1–0	1–1	—	1–1	0–3
Sutjeska	1–0	0–2	3–1	2–0	1–1	0–0	1–0	2–1	—	2–0	2–2	1–2	2–0	3–1	1–3	1–1	3–0	3–0	—	6–1
Zeta	0–0	1–1	1–1	1–2	0–1	1–1	1–2	2–0	0–4	—	2–2	1–2	3–1	0–0	0–1	3–0	1–0	1–0	0–1	—

Source: Football Association of Montenegro (in Montenegrin), Soccerway
Legend: Blue = home team win; Yellow = draw; Red = away team win.
For upcoming matches, an "a" indicates there is an article about the rivalry between the two participants.

== Relegation play-offs ==
The 8th-placed team (against the 3rd-placed team of the Second League) and the 9th-placed team (against the runners-up of the Second League) will both compete in two-legged relegation play-offs after the end of the season.

=== Summary ===
Team 1	Agg.	Team 2	1st leg	2nd leg
Mladost DG	3–5	Rudar	1–4	2–1
Arsenal	5–1	Podgorica	4–0	1–1

=== Matches ===
30 May 2022
17:30 CEST

Mladost DG	1–4	Rudar
Škrijelj 37'	Report	Živković 9'; Vujanović 29', 33'; Gašević 48'

DG Arena, Podgorica
Attendance: 150
Referee: Predrag Radovanović
3 June 2022
18:00 CEST

Rudar	1–2	Mladost DG
Vujanović 31'	Report	Stanisavić 40'; Mihaljević 75'

Gradski stadion, Pljevlja
Attendance: 300
Referee: Miloš Bešović

Rudar won 5–3 on aggregate.

30 May 2022
17:30 CEST

Arsenal	4–0	Podgorica
Manojlović 32' (pen.), 75'; Muhović 36'; Došljak 50'	Report

Stadion u Parku, Tivat
Attendance: 1,500
Referee: Savo Vujović
3 June 2022
20:00 CEST

Podgorica	1–1	Arsenal
Bajović 60'	Report	Pepić 76'

DG Arena, Podgorica
Attendance: 350
Referee: Vojin Vojinović

Arsenal won 5–1 on aggregate.

== Statistics ==
=== Top goalscorers ===
As of 24 May 2022

Rank	Scorer	Club	Goals
1	(Bosnia and Herzegovina) Adnan Bašić	Petrovac	14
2	(Montenegro) Igor Ivanović	Budućnost	13
2	(Montenegro) Balša Sekulić	Iskra	13
2	(Montenegro) Miloš Raičković	Budućnost	13
5	(Argentina) Rodrigo Faust	Jezero	11
5	(Montenegro) Kristijan Vulaj	Dečić	11
7	(Montenegro) Aleksandar Vujačić	Mornar	10
7	(Montenegro) Marko Miličković	Petrovac	10
9	(Montenegro) Viktor Đukanović	Budućnost	9
9	(Serbia) Dušan Živković	Rudar	9

== See also ==
- Montenegrin First League
