= Mamadou Mendy =

Senegalese footballer

Personal information
- Date of birth: 4 October 1998 (age 28)
- Place of birth: Guédiawaye, Senegal
- Height: 1.85 m (6 ft 1 in)
- Position: Winger

Team information
- Current team: Argeș Pitești
- Number: 8

Youth career
- 2014–2018: SPES Academy

Senior career*
Years	Team	Apps	(Gls)
2017–2018	Guédiawaye		
2018–2021	Titograd	67	(6)
2021–2022	Jezero	47	(7)
2022–2023	Petrovac	32	(10)
2023–2026	İstanbulspor	65	(4)
2024–2025	→ Sakaryaspor (loan)	31	(10)
2026–	Argeș Pitești	4	(1)
- * Club domestic league appearances and goals as of 6 November 2026

Mamadou Mendy (born 4 October 1998) is a Senegalese professional footballer who plays as a winger for Liga I club Argeș Pitești.

== Career ==
Mamadou joined the Senegalese academy SPES Academy in 2014. He moved to Montenegro with Titograd in February 2018. In January 2021 he moved to Jezero, and remained at the club the following season. He spent the 2022–23 season with Petrovac where he scored 10 goals in 32 games. After 5 years in Montenegro, he transferred to the Turkish Süper Lig side İstanbulspor on a three-year contract on 28 July 2023.

== Career statistics ==
=== Club ===
As of match played 6 November 2026

Club	Season	League			National cup (Note: Includes Montenegrin Cup, Turkish Cup, Cupa României)		Continental		Other		Total	
Club	Season	Division	Apps	Goals	Apps	Goals	Apps	Goals	Apps	Goals	Apps	Goals
Guédiawaye	2017–18	Senegal Premier League	?	?	?	?	–		–		?	?
Titograd	2017–18	Montenegrin First League	8	0	2	0	–		–		10	0
Titograd	2018–19	Montenegrin First League	24	5	0	0	0	0	–		24	5
Titograd	2019–20	Montenegrin First League	24	1	2	0	2 (Note: Appearances in UEFA Europa League)	0	2 (Note: Appearances in Montenegrin First League promotion/relegation play-offs)	0	30	1
Titograd	2020–21	Montenegrin First League	11	0	0	0	–		–		11	0
Titograd	Total		67	6	4	0	2	0	2	0	75	6
Jezero	2020–21	Montenegrin First League	17	3	–		–		–		17	3
Jezero	2021–22	Montenegrin First League	30	4	1	1	–		–		31	5
Jezero	Total		47	7	1	1	–		–		48	8
Petrovac	2022–23	Montenegrin First League	32	10	1	0	–		–		33	10
İstanbulspor	2023–24	Süper Lig	32	2	1	1	–		–		33	3
İstanbulspor	2024–25	TFF 1. Lig	3	0	–		–		–		3	0
İstanbulspor	2025–26	TFF 1. Lig	30	2	3	2	–		–		33	4
İstanbulspor	Total		65	4	4	3	–		–		69	7
Sakaryaspor (loan)	2024–25	TFF 1. Lig	31	10	0	0	–		–		31	10
Argeș Pitești	2026–27	Liga I	4	1	1	0	–		–		5	1
Career total			246	38	11	4	2	0	2	0	261	42

== Personal life ==
Mendy married his Montenegrin wife Bernisa Mekić in February 2021. That same year he had his first daughter, who was born in Montenegro.

== Honours ==
Titograd

- Montenegrin Cup: 2017–18
