= Aleksa Ćetković =

Montenegrin footballer (born 2004)

Personal information
- Full name: Aleksa Ćetković
- Date of birth: 13 February 2004 (age 22)
- Place of birth: Podgorica, Serbia and Montenegro
- Position: Midfielder

Team information
- Current team: Arsenal Tivat
- Number: 28

Youth career
- -2021: Budućnost Podgorica

Senior career*
Years	Team	Apps	(Gls)
2021-2024	Budućnost Podgorica	29	(0)
2023	→ Arsenal Tivat (loan)	15	(0)
2024	→ Arsenal Tivat (loan)	16	(1)
2024-	Arsenal Tivat	70	(3)

International career
2018	Montenegro U15	6	(1)
2019	Montenegro U16	9	(0)
2019-2020	Montenegro U17	5	(0)
2020	Montenegro U18	2	(0)
2021-2022	Montenegro U19	19	(1)
2023-	Montenegro U21	11	(1)
- * Club domestic league appearances and goals

Aleksa Ćetković (Cyrillic: Алекса Ћетковић, born 13 February 2004) is a Montenegrin professional footballer who plays as a midfielder for Arsenal Tivat.

He started his professional career at Budućnost Podgorica where he played until 2024 with two short loan spells at Arsenal Tivat. During his time at Budućnost Podgorica he won two Montenegrin First League titles and also Montenegrin Cup two times. Since summer of 2024, he is member of Arsenal Tivat.

== Honours ==
Budućnost

- Montenegrin First League: 2020–21, 2022–23
- Montenegrin Cup: 2020–21, 2021–22
