= Petar Grbić =

Montenegrin footballer (born 1988)

Petar Grbić Петар Грбић
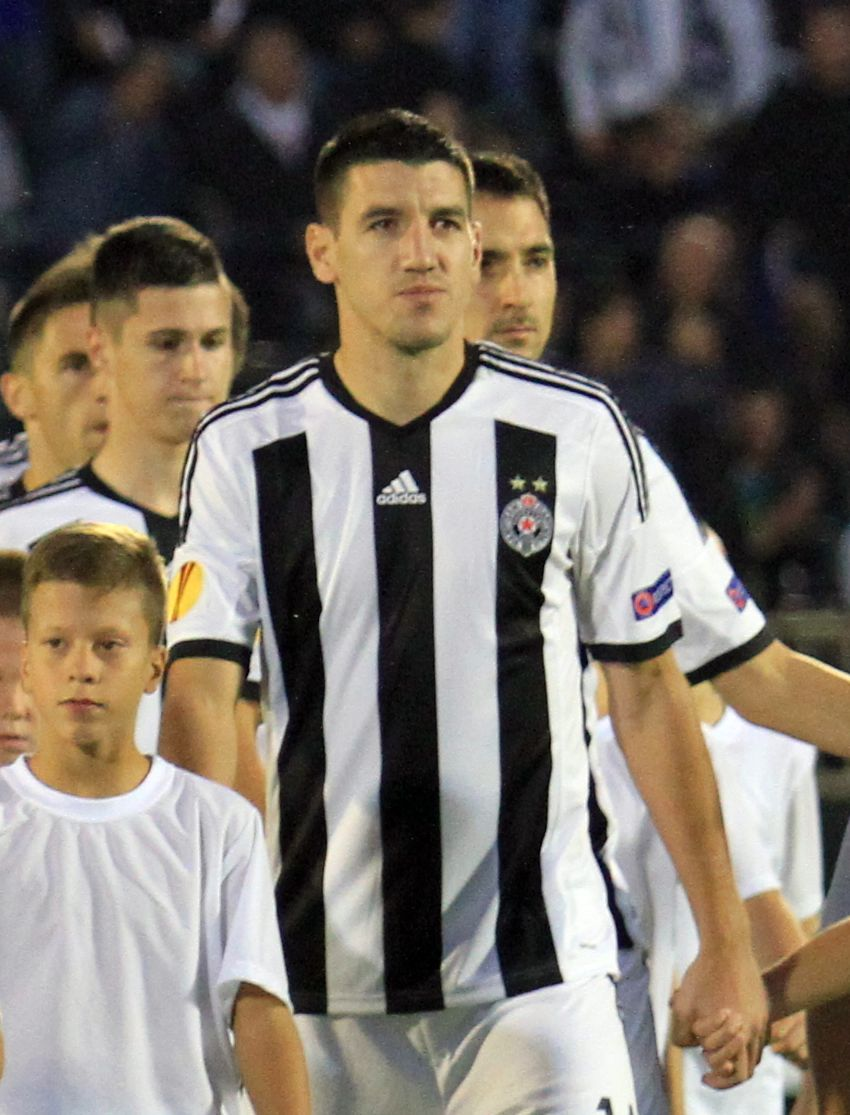
- Grbić playing for FK Partizan in 2014

Personal information
- Full name: Petar Grbić
- Date of birth: 7 August 1988 (age 38)
- Place of birth: Titograd, SFR Yugoslavia
- Height: 1.88 m (6 ft 2 in)
- Positions: Winger; forward

Senior career*
Years	Team	Apps	(Gls)
2007–2008	Mladost Podgorica	12	(1)
2008–2011	Mogren	76	(12)
2011–2014	Olympiacos	0	(0)
2011	→ Levadiakos (loan)	6	(0)
2012	→ Hapoel Be'er Sheva (loan)	6	(0)
2012–2013	→ OFK Beograd (loan)	22	(7)
2013	→ Partizan (loan)	5	(0)
2014–2016	Partizan	38	(3)
2016–2017	Akhisar Belediyespor	10	(1)
2017	→ Adana Demirspor (loan)	19	(1)
2018	Budućnost	15	(0)
2018–2019	Radnički Niš	32	(3)
2019–2021	Budućnost	46	(10)
2021–2022	Mornar	49	(5)
2023–2026	Budućnost	89	(15)

International career^{‡}
2011	Montenegro U21	4	(0)
2011–2016	Montenegro	7	(0)
- * Club domestic league appearances and goals as of 18 February 2026 ‡ National team caps and goals as of 9 June 2015

Petar Grbić (Serbian Cyrillic: Петар Грбић; born 7 August 1988) is a former Montenegrin professional footballer.

== Club career ==
=== Mogren ===
In 2008, Grbić joined FK Mogren from Budva. At the time of Grbić's arrival, Mogren was coached by Branislav "Brano" Milačić and players from the Montenegrin national team including Radoslav Batak, Ivan Janjušević, Janko Simović, Marko Ćetković, and Draško Božović. Grbić was a member of the Mogren squads which won the Montenegrin First League in 2009 and 2011.

=== Olympiacos ===
In July 2011, Greek side Olympiacos earned Grbić's signature in a €1 million transfer from Mogren. During the team's summer camp that year, coach Ernesto Valverde only employed Grbić as a substitute, preferring the likes of Kevin Mirallas. He spent the rest of his time at Olympiacos on loan, first to Levadiakos, followed by Hapoel Be'er Sheva, OFK Beograd, and finally to Partizan.

==== Loan to OFK Beograd ====
On 5 September 2012 it was announced that Grbić joined OFK Beograd in a six-month loan. On 11 November 2012 Grbić scored the winning goal in a match against Red Star Belgrade; it was OFK Beograd's first win over Red Star since 2003. Less than two weeks later, Grbić scored a brace against Red Star in the 2012–13 Serbian Cup quarter finals. After a great half-season with the Serbian team, the loan deal was extended to June 2013.

=== Partizan ===
On 13 July 2013 Grbić joined Partizan on loan from Olympiacos. In January 2014, Olympiacos officially traded Grbić to Partizan in an exchange for Marko Šćepović. On 18 March 2015 Grbić scored the opening goal in the 2015 Serbian Cup semi-final, after which he ran to his team's bench to put on a second left cleat. The stunt was meant as a response to Serbia's Prime Minister Aleksandar Vučić, who commented before the match that "some players in Partizan have two left legs". Vučić apologized on his Twitter profile and congratulated Grbić in his tweet.

=== Akhisar Belediyespor ===
In January 2016, Grbić moved to Turkish club Akhisar Belediyespor, where he initially saw playing time but was subsequently loaned to Adana Demirspor, a team which had just been promoted to the Turkish Süper Lig. In an interview with Serbian sports portal HotSport, Grbić suggested that the financial situation in Adana Demirspor was unstable at the time he left.

=== Budućnost ===
In December 2017, Grbić signed with Montenegrin club Budućnost.

He returned to the club in June 2019 after a year at Radnički Niš.

== International career ==
Grbić made his debut for Montenegro in a March 2011 friendly match against Uzbekistan and has earned a total of 7 caps, scoring no goals. His final international was a March 2016 friendly against Belarus.

== Personal ==
His younger sister Itana is a handball player. He is married and has two daughters.

== Honours ==
Mogren

- Montenegrin First League: 2008–09, 2010–11

Partizan

- Serbian SuperLiga: 2014–15

Budućnost Podgorica

- Montenegrin First League: 2019–20, 2020–21, 2022–23, 2024–25
- Montenegrin Cup: 2020–21
