= Adnan Bašić =

Bosnian footballer (born 1996)

Personal information
- Date of birth: 13 December 1996 (age 29)
- Place of birth: Mostar, Bosnia and Herzegovina
- Height: 1.85 m (6 ft 1 in)
- Position: Forward

Team information
- Current team: OFK Petrovac
- Number: 10

Youth career
- –2014: Velež Mostar
- 2014–2015: Celje

Senior career*
Years	Team	Apps	(Gls)
2015–2017	Celje	5	(0)
2016–2017	→ Drava Ptuj (loan)	23	(14)
2017–2019	Titus Pétange	37	(8)
2019–2020	UNA Strassen	6	(0)
2020	Vyšehrad	10	(2)
2021–2022	OFK Petrovac	43	(16)
2022–2023	Panevėžys	12	(1)
2023–	OFK Petrovac	82	(25)

International career^{‡}
2012	Bosnia and Herzegovina U17	3	(0)
2014	Bosnia and Herzegovina U18	1	(0)
2014–2015	Bosnia and Herzegovina U19	5	(1)
- * Club domestic league appearances and goals as of 17 June 2026 ‡ National team caps and goals as of 23 April 2015

Adnan Bašić (born 13 December 1996) is a Bosnian professional footballer who plays as a forward for Montenegrin First League club OFK Petrovac.

== Club career ==
=== Titus Pétange ===
In July 2017, Bašić signed a contract with Luxembourgish club Titus Pétange. He left the club after two season.

=== OFK Petrovac ===
In February 2021, Bašić signed a contract with Montenegrin club OFK Petrovac. In the 2021–22 season, Bašić won golden boot scoring 14 goals.

=== Panevėžys ===
In July 2022, Bašić signed a contract with Lithuanian club Panevėžys. He left the club after a half season.

== Career statistics ==
=== Club ===
As of match played 7 October 2023

Appearances and goals by club, season and competition
Club	Season	League			National cup (Note: Appearance(s) in Luxembourg Cup, Montenegrin Cup, Lithuanian Football Cup)		Europe		Total	
Club	Season	League	Apps	Goals	Apps	Goals	Apps	Goals	Apps	Goals
Celje	2014–15	Slovenian PrvaLiga	2	0	0	0	—		2	0
Celje	2015–16	Slovenian PrvaLiga	3	0	0	0	–		3	0
Celje	Total		5	0	0	0	0	0	5	0
Drava Ptuj (loan)	2016–17	2.SNL	23	14	0	0	–		23	14
Titus Pétange	2017–18	BGL Ligue	20	6	2	2	–		22	8
Titus Pétange	2018–19	BGL Ligue	17	3	2	4	–		19	7
Titus Pétange	Total		37	9	4	6	0	0	41	15
UNA Strassen	2019–20	BGL Ligue	6	0	1	2	–		7	2
Vyšehrad	2019–20	Czech National Football League	10	2	0	0	–		10	2
OFK Petrovac	2020–21	1.CFL	10	2	0	0	–		10	2
OFK Petrovac	2021–22	1.CFL	33	14	1	0	–		34	14
OFK Petrovac	Total		43	16	1	0	0	0	44	16
Panevėžys	2022	A Lyga	12	1	1	0	–		13	1
OFK Petrovac	2023–24	1.CFL	8	3	0	0	–		8	3
Career total			33	0	1	0	0	0	34	0

== Honours ==
Individual

- 1.CFL Top Goalscorer: 2021–22 (14 goals)
