= Mladen Milinković =

Serbian football coach and former player (born 1968)

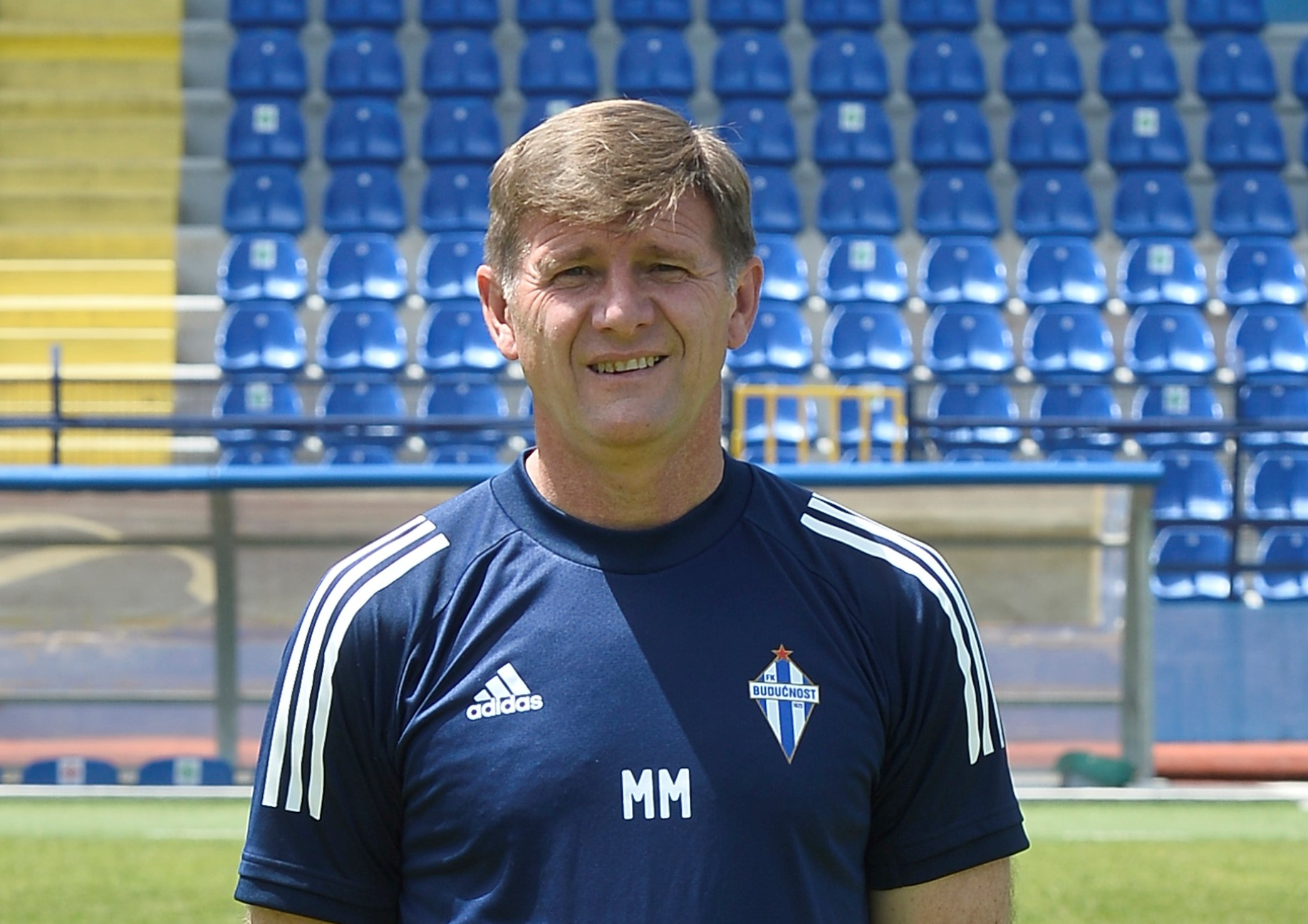
- Milinković in 2021

Personal information
- Date of birth: 14 May 1968 (age 58)
- Place of birth: Loznica, SFR Yugoslavia
- Height: 1.82 m (6 ft 0 in)
- Position: Midfielder

Senior career*
| Years | Team | Apps | (Gls) |
| 1984–1987 | Gučevo | 88 | (27) |
| 1987–1988 | Mačva Šabac | 2 | (1) |
| 1988–1991 | Drina Zvornik | 68 | (18) |
| 1991–1993 | Loznica | 59 | (11) |
| 1993–1996 | Omonia Aradippou | 92 | (9) |
| 1996–1998 | Loznica | 52 | (8) |
| 1998–2000 | FF Jaro | 57 | (10) |
| 2000 | Naoussa | 23 | (8) |
| 2001 | FF Jaro | 23 | (3) |
| 2002 | Kastoria | 17 | (0) |
| 2003 | Radnički Stobex | 25 | (5) |

Managerial career
- 1998–2000: FF Jaro (youth team)
- 2003: Radnički Stobex
- 2003–2004: Jedinstvo
- 2004–2006: Drina Zvornik
- 2006–2007: Bane Raška
- 2007–2009: Drina Zvornik
- 2010–2011: Radnički Stobex
- 2012: Loznica
- 2013: BSK Borča
- 2014: OFK Igalo
- 2014–2015: Radnik Surdulica
- 2016–2017: Luftëtari
- 2017: Kukësi
- 2018: Keşla
- 2019: Syrianska
- 2019–2021: Budućnost Podgorica
- 2022–2023: Al-Sahel
- 2023–2024: Budućnost Podgorica
- 2025–: Partizani
- * Club domestic league appearances and goals

Mladen Milinković (Serbian Cyrillic: Младен Милинковић; born 14 May 1968) is a Serbian football coach and former player. He played as midfielder for FK Loznica, FK Mačva Šabac, Drina Zvornik, Omonia Aradippou from Cyprus, FF Jaro from Finland, Naoussa F.C. and Kastoria F.C. from Greece.

== Position ==
Milinkovic played in the position of central midfielder but could also operate as a central defender.

== Career ==
=== As player ===
He started his career in Serbian club FK Gučevo, then went to Mačva Šabac. In 1988, he went to Bosnia, where he played 3 seasons for FK Drina Zvornik. From FK Drina Zvornik he went to FK Loznica in 1991 and spent 2 seasons in club where on 3 July 1993 he scored deciding goal against Vrbas in play-off for promotion to Seconde League of Yugoslavia, the biggest success in club's history. From 1993 to 1996 he played in Cypriot First Division for Omonia Aradippou. After Cyprus he returned to FK Loznica where he stayed until the beginning of 1998 when he went to Finland, where he played for FF Jaro in two periods(1998–2000, 2001). Also he played Second League in Greece for Naoussa (2000) and Kastoria (2002). Finished his career in Radnički Stobex.

=== As coach ===
Started his coaching career in 2003 in FK Radnički Stobex where he acted as Head Coach/Player. He worked in First League of the Republika Srpska as head coach of FK Drina Zvornik from 2004 to 2006 and 2007 to 2009.

In season 2014–15 as head coach of FK Radnik Surdulica Milinković won Serbian First League and made historical success to promote in Serbian Superleague. He worked in Albania in two teams Luftëtari (2016–2017) and Kukësi (2017). After that he went to Azerbaijan, where he was head coach of Keşla. From 5 July until 6 November 2019 Milinković worked in Sweden, where he was head coach of Syrianska.

From 9 November 2019 until 30 July 2021 Milinković was head coach of Budućnost Podgorica. He guided the club to successive Montenegrin First League titles in seasons 2019–20 and 2020–21, first time in the history of Budućnost. In 2020–21 season Budućnost with Mladen Milinković in charge, had the most successful season in the history of the club winning first time the Double and broke many records in Montenegrin football, among them is winning title 7 rounds before the end, finishing season with 28 points lead to the second place, biggest number of earned points (85), highest number of wins (27) and the longest unbeaten run (23 games).

== Education ==
- Coach with UEFA Pro Diploma.
- Senior football coach – The coaches Academy – The faculty for Physical education in Niš.

== Honours ==
=== As player ===
FF Jaro

- Finnish League Cup Runner-up: 1998
- Finnish Cup Runner-up: 1999

=== As coach ===
Radnik Surdulica

- Serbian First League: 2014–15

Budućnost Podgorica

- Montenegrin First League: 2019–20, 2020–21
- Montenegrin Cup: 2020–21

Individual

- Montenegrin First League Best Coach: 2020
