= Igor Ćuković =

Montenegrin footballer (born 1993)

Personal information
- Full name: Igor Ćuković
- Date of birth: 6 June 1993 (age 33)
- Place of birth: Nikšić, SR Montenegro, Yugoslavia
- Height: 1.91 m (6 ft 3 in)
- Position: Centre-back

Team information
- Current team: Semen Padang
- Number: 26

Youth career
- Sutjeska Nikšić

Senior career*
Years	Team	Apps	(Gls)
2012–2017	Sutjeska Nikšić	112	(5)
2017–2018	Elverum	14	(0)
2018–2019	Kamza	9	(0)
2019	Znojmo	11	(0)
2019–2020	Rudar Pljevlja	28	(2)
2020–2022	Budućnost Podgorica	41	(2)
2022–2023	Dečić	25	(1)
2023–2024	Loznica		
2025–2026	Bokelj	26	(3)
2026–	Semen Padang	2	(1)

International career
2011–2012	Montenegro U19	6	(0)
2013–2014	Montenegro U21	2	(0)
- * Club domestic league appearances and goals as of 20 September 2026

Igor Ćuković (Montenegrin: Игор Чуковић; born 6 June 1993) is a Montenegrin professional footballer who plays as a centre-back for Championship club Semen Padang.

== Club career ==
=== European career ===
Ćuković emerged through the youth academy of Sutjeska Nikšić and made his senior professional debut in the Montenegrin First League during the 2012–13 season. He became a mainstay in Sutjeska's defensive unit, making over 100 league appearances and winning domestic titles before moving to Norwegian club Elverum Fotball in 2017.

He later had brief stints with Kamza in Albania and Znojmo in the Czech Republic before returning to Montenegro. Between 2019 and 2023, Ćuković represented prominent Montenegrin clubs including Rudar Pljevlja, Budućnost Podgorica, and Dečić. Following a short spell with Serbian lower-tier side Loznica, he joined Bokelj for the 2025–26 season, where he recorded 26 league appearances and scored three goals.

=== Semen Padang ===
In June 2026, Ćuković moved to Southeast Asia and officially signed a professional contract with Indonesian side Semen Padang. He was signed as part of a tactical squad overhaul by the management to reinforce the club's defensive center backline for the 2026–27 Championship campaign. He made his league debut for Semen Padang on 13 September 2026, in a 0–1 away win over Persiraja Banda Aceh at the H. Dimurthala Stadium. A week later, on 20 September, he scored his first goal for Semen Padang in a 1–1 draw over PSIS Semarang.

== International career ==
At the international level, Ćuković represented Montenegro across various youth echelons. He featured in six official matches for the Montenegro national under-19 football team, and later received international call-ups to represent the Montenegro under-21 squad during regional tournament qualification phases.

== Honours ==
FK Budućnost Podgorica

- Montenegrin First League: 2020–21
- Montenegrin Cup: 2021–22

FK Sutjeska Nikšić

- Montenegrin First League: 2013–2014
- Montenegrin Cup: 2016–17
