= Modjieb Jamali =

Afghan footballer

Personal information
- Date of birth: 30 April 1991 (age 35)
- Place of birth: Kabul, Afghanistan
- Height: 1.70 m (5 ft 7 in)
- Positions: Midfielder; right-back

Youth career
- 2008–2010: Kickers Offenbach
- 2010–2011: FSV Frankfurt

Senior career*
Years	Team	Apps	(Gls)
2012–2013	FSV Frankfurt II	8	(1)
2013	FC St. Pauli II	22	(1)
2013–2015	Kickers Offenbach	0	(0)
2013–2014	→ Kickers Offenbach II	22	(1)
2015–2016	Metalul Reșița	30	(1)
2017	Dečić Tuzi	8	(0)
2018	Sportul Snagov	13	(0)
2018	Constància	9	(0)

International career^{‡}
2016–2017	Afghanistan	8	(0)
- * Club domestic league appearances and goals as of 17:55, 3 March 2021 (UTC) ‡ National team caps and goals as of 17:55, 3 March 2021 (UTC)

Modjieb Jamali (Dari: مجيب جمالي; born 30 April 1991) is an Afghan footballer who plays as a midfielder or right-back.

== Club career ==
Jamali played with Romanian side Metalul Reșița. In January 2017 he signed with Montenegrin side FK Dečić.

== International career ==
Jamali was called up for Afghanistan for the World Cup 2018 Qualifying games against Japan and Singapore. He made his debut in 2016 against Japan.
