= Janko Simović =

Montenegrin footballer

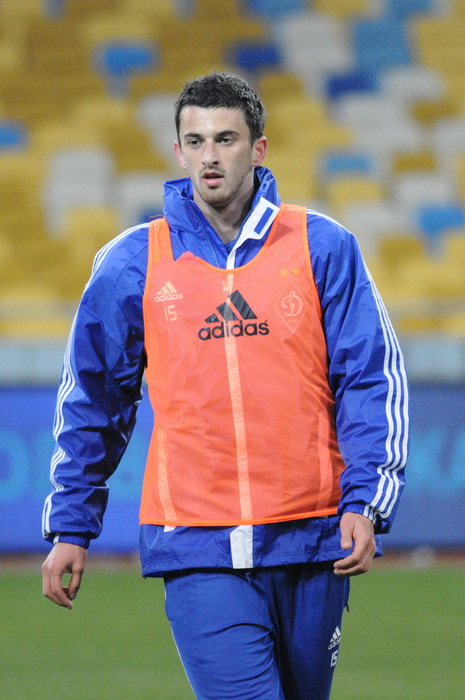
- Simović with Dynamo Kyiv in 2012

Personal information
- Date of birth: 7 June 1986 (age 40)
- Place of birth: Mojkovac, SFR Yugoslavia
- Height: 1.95 m (6 ft 5 in)
- Position: Center-back

Youth career
- 2001–2003: OFK Igalo

Senior career*
Years	Team	Apps	(Gls)
2003–2007	Berane	31	(0)
2008	Metalac GM	9	(0)
2008–2012	Mogren	101	(5)
2012–2013	Dynamo Kyiv	0	(0)
2012	→ Arsenal Kyiv (loan)	0	(0)
2013	→ Dynamo-2 Kyiv	0	(0)
2014	Lovćen	12	(1)
2014–2015	Budućnost	45	(4)
2016	PTT Rayong	0	(0)
2017	Budućnost	29	(0)
2018	Mladost Podgorica	7	(0)
2019	Rudar Pljevlja	8	(0)
2019	Dinamo Vranje	15	(2)
2020	Grbalj	8	(0)
2020–2021	Zeta	22	(1)
Total		287	(13)

International career
2007	Montenegro U21	2	(0)
2008	Montenegro	1	(0)
- * Club domestic league appearances and goals as of 13:47, 9 November 2020 (UTC)

Janko Simović (born 7 June 1986) is a Montenegrin retired footballer who played as a center back.

== Club career ==
=== Early career ===
Born in Mojkovac, SR Montenegro, SFR Yugoslavia, Simović learned his trade in OFK Igalo. He made his debut in senior-level football with Berane, after which he joined Metalac GM for a brief spell. He subsequently joined Mogren in 2008.

=== Mogren ===
In 2008, Simović joined Mogren. At the time of Simović's arrival, Mogren was an ambitious team with coach Branislav "Brano" Milačić and a number of players from the Montenegro national team involving the likes of Radoslav Batak, Ivan Janjušević, Petar Grbić, Marko Ćetković, and Draško Božović.

=== Dynamo Kyiv ===
In late February 2012, Simović traveled to Israel to trial with Ukrainian team Dynamo Kyiv. During the trial, Simović played a friendly match for Dynamo against Maccabi Haifa, which Dynamo won 5–0. On 1 March 2012 he signed a three-year contract with Dynamo Kyiv. Dynamo Kyiv paid Mogren approximately €200,000 for Simović's transfer. After signing with Dynamo, he was loaned first to Arsenal Kyiv, and then loaned to Dynamo's B team. During his loans, Simović had a back injury, and after two years he terminated his contract with Dynamo.

=== Lovćen ===
After terminating his contract with Dynamo Kyiv, Simović joined Montenegrin team FK Lovćen in March 2014. In his first match with Lovćen, Simović scored a header against Budućnost only three minutes into the game. He was a starting player in Lovćen's squad which won the 2014 Montenegrin Cup.

=== Budućnost ===
After only a half season at Lovćen, Simović joined Budućnost in the summer of 2014 on a one-year contract. In August 2015, Budućnost and Simović agreed to renew the contract by one more year.

=== Mladost Podgorica ===
Simović signed a contract with Mladost Podgorica in late January 2018.

== International career ==
After representing Montenegro at under-21 level, he made his debut for the senior team in a November 2008 friendly match against Macedonia. He came on as an injury time substitute for Elsad Zverotić and these remained his sole international minutes.

== Honours ==
Mogren

- Montenegrin First League: 2008–09, 2010–11

Lovćen

- Montenegrin Cup: 2014
