= Marko Merdović =

Montenegrin footballer

Personal information
- Full name: Marko Merdović
- Date of birth: 17 November 1998 (age 27)
- Place of birth: Kotor, FR Yugoslavia
- Height: 1.90 m (6 ft 3 in)
- Position: Center-back

Team information
- Current team: OFK Petrovac
- Number: 44

Youth career
- 2009–2015: Mogren
- 2015–2017: Grbalj

Senior career*
Years	Team	Apps	(Gls)
2017–2020	Grbalj	78	(0)
2018	→ Arsenal Tivat (loan)	4	(0)
2020–2021	Rudar Pljevlja	32	(3)
2021–2023	1. FC Slovácko B	39	(5)
2023	→ Radomlje (loan)	9	(0)
2024–2025	Arsenal Tivat	39	(4)
2025–	OFK Petrovac	32	(1)

International career
2019	Montenegro U21	2	(0)
- * Club domestic league appearances and goals as of 17 June 2026

Marko Merdović (born 17 November 1998) is a Montenegrin professional footballer who plays for OFK Petrovac.

Merdović started his professional career in 2017 at Grbalj and in 2020 he transferred to Rudar Pljevlja and year later to 1. FC Slovácko. First half of the season 2023/24, he spent on loan at Radomlje.
