= Edis Mulalić =

Bosnian football manager (born 1975)

Personal information
- Date of birth: 23 October 1975 (age 51)
- Place of birth: Sarajevo, SFR Yugoslavia
- Height: 1.81 m (5 ft 11 in)
- Position: Left-back

Team information
- Current team: Sloboda Tuzla (manager)

Youth career
- –1994: Željezničar

Senior career*
Years	Team	Apps	(Gls)
1994–1996	Željezničar	31	(0)
1996–1997	Uerdingen 05	26	(0)
1997–1998	Eintracht Frankfurt	7	(0)
1998–2002	Željezničar	81	(4)
2002–2003	TOŠK Tešanj	25	(3)
2003–2006	Željezničar	51	(3)
2006–2008	Hamm		
2008–2010	Željezničar	57	(5)
Total		278	(15)

International career
1999–2000	Bosnia and Herzegovina	2	(0)

Managerial career
- 2015–2016: Željezničar
- 2016–2017: Dečić
- 2017–2018: Mladost Doboj Kakanj
- 2018: Rudar Pljevlja
- 2019: Titograd
- 2019–2020: Rudar Pljevlja
- 2020–2021: Dečić
- 2022–2023: Željezničar
- 2023–2024: Igman Konjic
- 2024–2025: Dečić
- 2026–: Sloboda Tuzla
- * Club domestic league appearances and goals

Edis Mulalić (born 23 October 1975) is a Bosnian professional football manager and former player who is the manager of First League of FBiH club Sloboda Tuzla.

Born in Sarajevo, he is best known for playing for hometown club Željezničar, making over 300 appearances for the club in all competitions. He has also managed the club on two occasions.

== Club career ==
Born in Sarajevo, SFR Yugoslavia, Mulalić started his career with hometown club Željezničar. He played for the club on four occasions, winning three league titles, two cups and three supercups. He played 220 league games for Željezničar and 322 games in all competitions. In Bosnia and Herzegovina, he also played for TOŠK Tešanj.

Mulalić also played in Germany for Uerdingen 05, Eintracht Frankfurt with whom he won the 2. Bundesliga, and Hamm. He finished his playing career in 2010 winning one of the three league titles throughout his career as club captain with Željezničar at the age of 35.

== International career ==
Mulalić made his debut for Bosnia and Herzegovina in a March 1999 friendly game away against Hungary and has earned a total of 2 caps, scoring no goals. His second and final international was a March 2000 friendly game against Jordan.

== Managerial career ==
=== Željezničar ===
Mulalić took over Željezničar during the 2015–16 season in September 2015. Under his lead, Željezničar recorded impressive 12 matches without losing in the national league, nine of them being straight victories. Along the way, the club beat fierce city rivals Sarajevo both home and away, a first time the club has beaten Sarajevo away at Asim Ferhatović Hase Stadium in 12 years.

In the Bosnian Cup competition, Mulalić led Željezničar to the semi finals, comprehensively losing to Sloboda Tuzla 2–5 on aggregate. He controversially got sacked after a draw against Rudar Prijedor on 7 May 2016, just one game before the end of the season.

=== Dečić ===
In September 2016, Mulalić was named the new manager of Montenegrin First League side Dečić. He made the biggest result in the club's history by finishing 5th in the league. After the end of the season, Mulalić decided to leave the club.

=== Mladost Doboj Kakanj ===
In June 2017, Mulalić came back to Bosnia and Herzegovina and became the new manager of Bosnian Premier League club Mladost Doboj Kakanj. After 4 league rounds Mladost were first on the league table. When the winter break started Mladost were 6th. In April 2018, about a month and a half before the end of the season, Mulalić left the club as it already secured safety from relegation. It was unsure why he left, but it was said that he left because of the thought of "the games being rigged." When Mulalić left, Maldost were 7th in the league, while at the end they finished 8th.

=== Years in Montenegro ===
On 21 July 2018, Mulalić was named manager of another Montenegrin First League club, Rudar Pljevlja. On 24 December 2018, Mulalić, alongside some of the players left the club due to financial problems that it had over the past months. Both sides said that they were on good terms.

On 31 January 2019, Mulalić became the new manager of Titograd. After only two months, he resigned after a loss against Zeta.

In July 2019, more than half a year after leaving the club, Mulalić came back to Rudar Pljevlja. In his first game back, Rudar Plevlja lost 2–0 away in a league match against Budućnost Podgorica on 5 August 2019. His first win back came on 14 August 2019, in a 0–1 away league win against Titograd.

On 21 July 2020, Mulalić returned to Dečić and became the club's new manager. He left Dečić in September 2021.

=== Return to Željezničar ===
On 7 January 2022, Željezničar appointed Mulalić as manager for the second time.

His first competitive game back in charge of Željezničar ended in a 2–0 away loss against Velež Mostar on 25 February 2022. Mulalić was victorious in his first Sarajevo derby since his return as manager, beating rivals Sarajevo on 5 March 2022. On 9 April 2022, he managed Željezničar to a 3–0 win against Leotar, the club's biggest league win of the season.

Mulalić's first match in the 2022–23 season saw his team draw against Leotar on 16 July 2022. Following back-to-back defeats against Leotar in the league and Velež in the first leg of the Bosnian Cup semi-finals, he mutually terminated his contract with Željezničar on 6 April 2023.

=== Igman Konjic ===
On 4 October 2023, Mulalić was appointed manager of Igman Konjic. He suffered defeat in his first match in charge, losing 2–0 away to Široki Brijeg on 8 October. He led the side to a 2–0 win against his former club Željezničar on 27 October.

Mulalić surprisingly left Igman on 27 April 2024, just two days before a crucial league game against Tuzla City in an effort to avoid relegation.

== Managerial statistics ==
As of match played 15 November 2026

Managerial record by team and tenure
Team	From	To	Record				
Team	From	To	G	W	D	L	Win %
Željezničar	29 September 2015	7 May 2016	23	16	4	3	69.57
Dečić	6 September 2016	6 June 2017	31	13	10	8	41.94
Mladost Doboj Kakanj	11 June 2017	8 April 2018	28	10	9	9	35.71
Rudar Pljevlja	21 July 2018	24 December 2018	21	5	10	6	23.81
Titograd	31 January 2019	5 March 2019	3	1	0	2	33.33
Rudar Pljevlja	27 July 2019	15 July 2020	32	11	5	16	34.38
Dečić	21 July 2020	20 September 2021	49	18	18	13	36.73
Željezničar	7 January 2022	6 April 2023	43	18	14	11	41.86
Igman Konjic	4 October 2023	27 April 2024	20	5	4	11	25.00
Dečić	11 October 2024	16 March 2025	14	5	5	4	35.71
Sloboda Tuzla	8 September 2026	Present	11	7	2	2	63.64
Total			275	109	81	85	39.64

== Honours ==
=== Player ===
Eintracht Frankfurt

- 2. Bundesliga: 1997–98

Željezničar

- Bosnian Premier League: 2000–01, 2001–02, 2009–10
- Bosnian Cup: 1999–2000, 2000–2001
- Bosnian Supercup: 1998, 2000, 2001

=== Manager ===
Dečić

- Montenegrin Cup runner-up: 2020–21
