= Miljan Radović =

Montenegrin footballer

Personal information
- Full name: Miljan Radović
- Date of birth: 18 October 1975 (age 51)
- Place of birth: Nikšić, SFR Yugoslavia
- Height: 1.82 m (5 ft 11 1/2 in)
- Position: Midfielder

Senior career*
Years	Team	Apps	(Gls)
1993−2000	Sutjeska Nikšić		
2000−2002	Vojvodina	31	(1)
2003−2004	Šmartno	7	(0)
2004−2007	Grbalj		
2007−2008	Mogren	16	(2)
2008	Grbalj	13	(0)
2009	Lovćen	10	(0)
2009−2011	Petrovac	44	(5)
2011−2012	Persib Bandung	67	(24)
2012−2013	Pelita Bandung Raya	16	(2)

Managerial career
- 2014–2018: OFK Grbalj
- 2018: DSK Shivajians
- 2018–2019: Persib Bandung
- 2020–2021: Sutjeska
- 2021–2022: Dečić
- 2023–2024: Voska Sport
- 2024: Sutjeska
- 2025–2026: Al-Ramtha
- * Club domestic league appearances and goals

Miljan Radović (Cyrillic: Миљан Радовић) is a Montenegrin retired footballer who played as a midfielder. He is well known for his accurate set pieces that often led to beautiful goals. He is also nicknamed 'The Professor' because of his quick, well-timed passes and entertaining skills.

== Playing career ==
Born in Nikšić (SR Montenegro, SFR Yugoslavia), he started his career in 1993 by playing with the local club FK Sutjeska Nikšić where in 7 seasons he made over 250 league appearances and scored over 30 goals. In 2000, he moved to FK Vojvodina also competing in the First League of FR Yugoslavia.

In 2003, he signed with NK Šmartno 1928 plating in the Slovenian First League. He later played with OFK Grbalj, FK Mogren, FK Lovćen and OFK Petrovac in the Montenegrin First League before moving abroad again, in 2011, by signing with Persib Bandung in the Indonesia Super League.

== Honours ==
Mogren

- Montenegrin Cup (1): 2007–08

== Statistics ==
=== Managerial Statistics ===
As of 31 August 2024

Managerial record by team and tenure
Team	From	To	Record							
Team	From	To	G	W	D	L	GF	GA	GD	Win %
OFK Grbalj	1 July 2016	6 June 2017	1	1	0	0	1	0	+1	100.00
Persib Bandung	1 January 2019	3 May 2019	6	1	2	3	11	10	+1	16.67
Sutjeska	15 November 2020	4 June 2021	22	10	8	4	37	19	+18	45.45
Dečić	27 September 2021	15 April 2022	20	8	7	5	32	27	+5	40.00
Voska Sport	15 June 2023	18 February 2024	19	5	5	9	22	32	−10	26.32
Sutjeska	6 March 2024	present	20	7	6	7	26	23	+3	35.00
Career total			88	32	28	28	129	111	+18	36.36
