= 2020–21 Montenegrin First League =

Montenegrin First League
- Season: 2020–21
- Dates: 15 August 2020 – 25 May 2021
- Champions: Budućnost; 5th title
- Relegated: OFK Titograd
- Champions League: Budućnost
- Europa Conference League: Dečić; Sutjeska; Podgorica
- Matches: 180
- Goals: 378 (2.1 per match)
- Top goalscorer: Božo Marković (16 goals)
- Biggest home win: Podgorica 4–0 Budućnost (29 August 2020); Rudar 4–0 Iskra (4 October 2020)
- Biggest away win: 5 matches: Titograd 0–4 Budućnost (8 November 2020); Rudar 0–4 Sutjeska (2 December 2020); Dečić 0–4 Budućnost (14 December 2020); Titograd 0–4 Sutjeska (3 April 2021); Podgorica 0–4 Sutjeska (19 May 2021)
- Highest scoring: Sutjeska 4–3 Zeta (6 March 2021)

The 2020–21 Montenegrin First League was the 15th season of the top-tier association football in Montenegro. The season began on 14 August 2020 and ended on 25 May 2021. The league winners qualified for a place in the 2021–22 UEFA Champions League.
Budućnost were the defending champions after winning the league in the previous season.

== Teams ==
2020–21 clubs

Defender of the title was Budućnost, while other teams which participated in previous season were Sutjeska, Iskra, Zeta, Podgorica, Petrovac, Rudar and Titograd.
Grbalj and Kom were relegated at the end of the previous season.
After earning promotion from the Montenegrin Second League, FK Dečić and FK Jezero competed in the league this season.
The following clubs competed in 2020–21 First League.

Team	City	Stadium	Capacity	Coach
Budućnost	Podgorica	Stadion pod Goricom	15,230	(Serbia) Mladen Milinković
Dečić	Tuzi	Stadion Tuško Polje	2,000	(Bosnia and Herzegovina) Edis Mulalić
Iskra	Danilovgrad	Braća Velašević Stadium	2,500	(Montenegro) Srđan Nikić
Jezero	Plav	Stadion Pod Racinom	2,500	(Montenegro) Milija Savović
Petrovac	Petrovac	Stadion pod Malim brdom	1,630	(Montenegro) Nenad Vukčević
FK Podgorica	Podgorica	DG Arena	4,300	(Montenegro) Milorad Peković
Rudar	Pljevlja	Stadion pod Golubinjom	5,140	(Montenegro) Vuko Bogavac
Sutjeska	Nikšić	Stadion kraj Bistrice	5,214	(Montenegro) Miljan Radović
OFK Titograd	Podgorica	Mladost Stadium	1,250	(Serbia) Vladimir Janković
Zeta	Golubovci	Stadion Trešnjica	4,000	(Serbia) Ratko Dostanić

== League table ==
Pos	Team	Pld	W	D	L	GF	GA	GD	Pts	Qualification or relegation
1	Budućnost (C)	36	27	4	5	65	29	+36	85	Qualification for the Champions League first qualifying round
2	Sutjeska	36	15	12	9	56	34	+22	57	Qualification for the Europa Conference League first qualifying round
3	Dečić	36	13	15	8	39	28	+11	54	Qualification for the Europa Conference League first qualifying round
4	Podgorica	36	15	7	14	39	38	+1	52	Qualification for the Europa Conference League first qualifying round
5	Jezero	36	12	9	15	28	34	−6	45	
6	Zeta (Note: Zeta were deducted 2 points for leaving the pitch in the round 9th match. This was later reduced to 1 point.)	36	13	7	16	34	41	−7	45	
7	Rudar	36	13	6	17	38	50	−12	45	
8	Iskra (O)	36	9	17	10	28	29	−1	44	Qualification for the relegation play-offs
9	Petrovac (O)	36	7	11	18	29	45	−16	32	Qualification for the relegation play-offs
10	OFK Titograd (R)	36	7	10	19	23	51	−28	31	Relegation to the Second League

Source: Football Association of Montenegro (in Montenegrin), Soccerway
Rules for classification: 1) Points; 2) Head-to-head points; 3) Head-to-head goal difference; 4) Head-to-head goals scored; 5) Goal difference; 6) Goals scored; 7) Draw.
(C) Champions; (O) Play-off winners; (R) Relegated

== Results ==
Clubs were scheduled to play each other four times for a total of 36 matches each.

Home \ Away	BUD	DEČ	ISK	JEZ	OFK	PET	POD	RUD	SUT	ZET	BUD	DEČ	ISK	JEZ	OFK	PET	POD	RUD	SUT	ZET
Budućnost	—	2–2	1–0	2–1	3–1	2–1	1–0	4–2	1–0	3–0 (Note: The match was abandoned in the 79th minute when the Zeta's players left the field due to the third red card shown to them by referee Nikola Dabanović. Budućnost were awarded a 3–0 win.)	—	2–0	1–0	3–2	1–0	0–2	1–2	3–1	1–1	0–1
Dečić	2–0	—	2–0	0–0	3–0	1–0	0–3	4–1	1–1	0–0	0–4	—	0–0	0–0	1–0	1–1	0–1	0–1	2–1	3–1
Iskra	0–2	0–0	—	2–1	1–1	1–0	1–1	0–1	3–0	0–0	1–1	2–1	—	1–1	1–1	0–0	1–0	2–0	0–0	1–1
Jezero	0–2	0–0	0–2	—	1–0	2–0	0–0	1–0	0–2	1–1	1–2	1–0	0–0	—	0–0	1–0	3–2	1–2	0–2	0–1
OFK Titograd	0–4	1–1	1–1	1–0	—	2–2	1–0	0–2	0–0	1–0	0–2	1–0	0–0	1–2	—	1–0	0–1	0–0	0–4	0–2
Petrovac	0–1	1–1	1–0	0–1	1–3	—	0–1	1–1	1–1	1–1	1–4	0–0	1–0	0–2	0–0	—	2–1	3–1	1–3	0–2
Podgorica	4–0	1–1	1–1	1–0	2–0	1–3	—	2–0	1–1	0–1	0–1	0–3	1–0	2–1	2–1	0–1	—	2–1	0–4	2–1
Rudar	1–2	0–3	4–0	0–1	3–1	1–0	1–0	—	0–4	0–3	1–1	0–0	0–0	4–2	4–2	2–0	1–0	—	0–2	0–1
Sutjeska	0–1	1–1	3–2	0–1	3–0	3–3	3–0	2–0	—	0–2	0–1	1–2	2–2	0–0	1–2	2–1	1–1	1–1	—	4–3
Zeta	0–2	0–2	0–1	1–0	1–0	1–0	1–1	2–1	0–1	—	2–4	1–2	0–2	0–1	2–1	1–1	1–3	0–1	0–2	—

Source: Football Association of Montenegro (in Montenegrin), Soccerway
Legend: Blue = home team win; Yellow = draw; Red = away team win.
For upcoming matches, an "a" indicates there is an article about the rivalry between the two participants.

== Relegation play-offs ==
The 10th-placed team (against the 3rd-placed team of the Second League) and the 11th-placed team (against the runners-up of the Second League) will both compete in two-legged relegation play-offs after the end of the season.

=== Summary ===
Team 1	Agg.	Team 2	1st leg	2nd leg
Iskra	3–1	Igalo	2–1	1–0
Petrovac	3–3 (6–5 p)	Arsenal	2–1	1–2

=== Matches ===
1 June 2021
20:00 CEST

Iskra	2–1	Igalo
Milić 46'; Račić 58'	Report	Lee 90+3'

Braća Velašević Stadium, Danilovgrad
Attendance: 200
Referee: Milovan Milačić
6 June 2021
17:30 CEST

Igalo	0–1	Iskra
	Report	Vuković 25' (pen.)

Stadion Solila, Igalo
Attendance: 400
Referee: Predrag Radovanović

Iskra won 3–1 on aggregate.

1 June 2021
20:00 CEST

Petrovac	2–1	Arsenal
Medigović 30', 88'	Report	Manojlović 44' (pen.)

Stadion pod Malim brdom, Petrovac
Attendance: 320
Referee: Nikola Dabanović
6 June 2021
17:30 CEST

Arsenal	2–1	Petrovac
Montenegro 25'; Manojlović 58' (pen.)	Report	Bašić 79'
Penalties
Montenegro (penalty scored); Ryo Tachibana (penalty missed); Radinović (penalty scored); Manojlović (penalty scored); Todorović (penalty scored); Musić (penalty scored); Hadžibegović (penalty missed)	5–6	(penalty scored) Bašić; (penalty scored) Divanović; (penalty scored) Ryoya Tachibana; (penalty scored) Vukčević; (penalty missed) Mikijelj; (penalty scored) Draganić; (penalty scored) Zvrko

Stadion u Parku, Tivat
Attendance: 1,500
Referee: Savo Vujović

4–4 on aggregate. Petrovac won on penalties.

== Statistics ==
=== Top goalscorers ===
As of 25 May 2021

Rank	Scorer	Club	Goals
1	(Montenegro) Božo Marković	Sutjeska	16
2	(Montenegro) Draško Božović	Budućnost	15
3	(Montenegro) Milutin Osmajić	Sutjeska	13
4	(Montenegro) Vuk Striković	Rudar	12
5	(Montenegro) Kristijan Vulaj	Dečić	11
6	(Montenegro) Ilir Camaj	Dečić	10
6	(Montenegro) Šaleta Kordić	Podgorica	10
8	(Montenegro) Igor Ivanović	Budućnost	9
9	(Montenegro) Dejan Zarubica	Budućnost	8
10	(Albania) Ndue Mujeci	Jezero	7

== See also ==
- Montenegrin First League
