= Ilir Camaj =

Montenegrin footballer (born 1996)

Personal information
- Full name: Ilir Camaj
- Date of birth: 24 June 1996 (age 30)
- Place of birth: Podgorica, FR Yugoslavia
- Height: 1.85 m (6 ft 1 in)
- Position: Forward

Team information
- Current team: Dečić
- Number: 9

Senior career*
Years	Team	Apps	(Gls)
2013–2017	Dečić	31	(6)
2017	Jezero	6	(0)
2017–2022	Dečić	131	(32)
2022	Dhofar Club	1	(1)
2022–2023	Egnatia	12	(2)
2023–	Dečić	81	(5)
- * Club domestic league appearances and goals as of 17 June 2026

Ilir Camaj (born 24 June 1996) is a Montenegrin footballer of Albanian descent who plays for FK Dečić.

== Professional career ==
On 11 June 2022, Camaj signed for Egnatia of the Kategoria Superiore.

On 22 January 2023, Camaj returned to his hometown club Dečić in the Montenegrin First League.

== Honours ==
Deçiq

- Montenegrin First League: 2023–24
- Montenegrin Second League: 2019–20
- Montenegrin Cup: 2024–25

Egnatia

- Albanian Cup: 2022–23
