= Aleksandar Vujačić (footballer) =

Montenegrin footballer

Personal information
- Date of birth: 19 March 1990 (age 36)
- Place of birth: Bar, Yugoslavia
- Height: 1.94 m (6 ft 4 in)
- Position: Center forward

Team information
- Current team: Otrant-Olympic
- Number: 9

Youth career
- 2007–2008: Mornar

Senior career*
Years	Team	Apps	(Gls)
2008–2009	Zemun	0	(0)
2009–2010	Mornar	2	(0)
2011–2013	Petrovac	63	(10)
2014–2015	Budućnost	38	(11)
2015–2016	Balzan	23	(11)
2016	Petrovac	16	(5)
2017	Prachuap	16	(1)
2017	Dinamo Brest	2	(0)
2018	Petrovac	26	(6)
2019–2021	Budućnost	45	(13)
2021	Petrovac	14	(2)
2022–2024	Mornar	82	(21)
2025–	Otrant-Olympic	44	(12)
- * Club domestic league appearances and goals as of 18 June 2026

Aleksandar Vujačić (Serbian Cyrillic: Александар Вујачић; born 19 March 1990) is a Montenegrin professional footballer who plays as a striker for Montenegrin club Otrant-Olympic.

== Club career ==
On 4 July 2015, Vujačić signed a one-year contract with Maltese club Balzan. He made his debut under coach Oliver Spiteri on 22 August 2015, scoring the last-minute goal in a 1–1 tie against Hibernians.

On 11 July 2017, Vujačić signed a one-year contract with Belarusian club Dynamo Brest.

On 9 January 2019, Vujačić returned to Budućnost in a €10,000 transfer from OFK Petrovac. In July 2019, he suffered an injury to his abdominal wall, for which he underwent surgery.
