= Julián Montenegro =

Argentine footballer (born 1989)

Personal information
- Date of birth: 23 March 1989 (age 37)
- Place of birth: Río Negro, Argentina
- Height: 1.82 m (6 ft 0 in)
- Position: Forward

Team information
- Current team: Arsenal Tivat
- Number: 11

Youth career
- Club Escuela Proyecto Crecer
- União Montemor

Senior career*
Years	Team	Apps	(Gls)
2008−2011	União Montemor	58	(22)
2011−2012	→ Vizela (loan)	24	(8)
2012−2013	Atlético CP	30	(1)
2013−2015	Boavista	43	(12)
2015	Farense	1	(0)
2016	Lynx	12	(1)
2016–2017	Lovćen	16	(3)
2017–2019	Grbalj	49	(5)
2019–2020	Lovćen	28	(7)
2020–	Arsenal Tivat	172	(25)
- * Club domestic league appearances and goals as of 1 June 2025

Julián Montenegro (born 23 March 1989) is an Argentine professional footballer who plays as a forward for Arsenal Tivat.

== Career ==
Born in Rio Negro, Montenegro arrived at União Montemor in 2008, to compete in the Regional league, helping the club get promotion into the fourth tier.

In 2011, he joined F.C. Vizela in the third tier, scoring 8 goals in 24 league matches. This led to a move to the professional divisions, signing with Atlético CP in 2012, and making his debut on 2 September 2012 in loss against Sporting da Covilhã.

After starting less than 10 league games in Atlético, Montenegro joined Boavista, at the time, playing in the third tier. He played only one year at Boavista and was deemed surplus, subsequently moved to Farense, where he spent six months before being released. On 1 February 2016, he signed with Lynx from the Gibraltar Premier Division.

In January 2017, Montenegro was one of the acquisitions of FK Lovćen for the second half of the 2016–17 Montenegrin First League. He scored on his debut league game for Lovćen against FK Jedinstvo.

After two seasons with OFK Grbalj, Montenegro returned to FK Lovćen ahead of the 2019−20 season.
