= Vladimir Janković (football) =

Serbian football manager (born 1970)

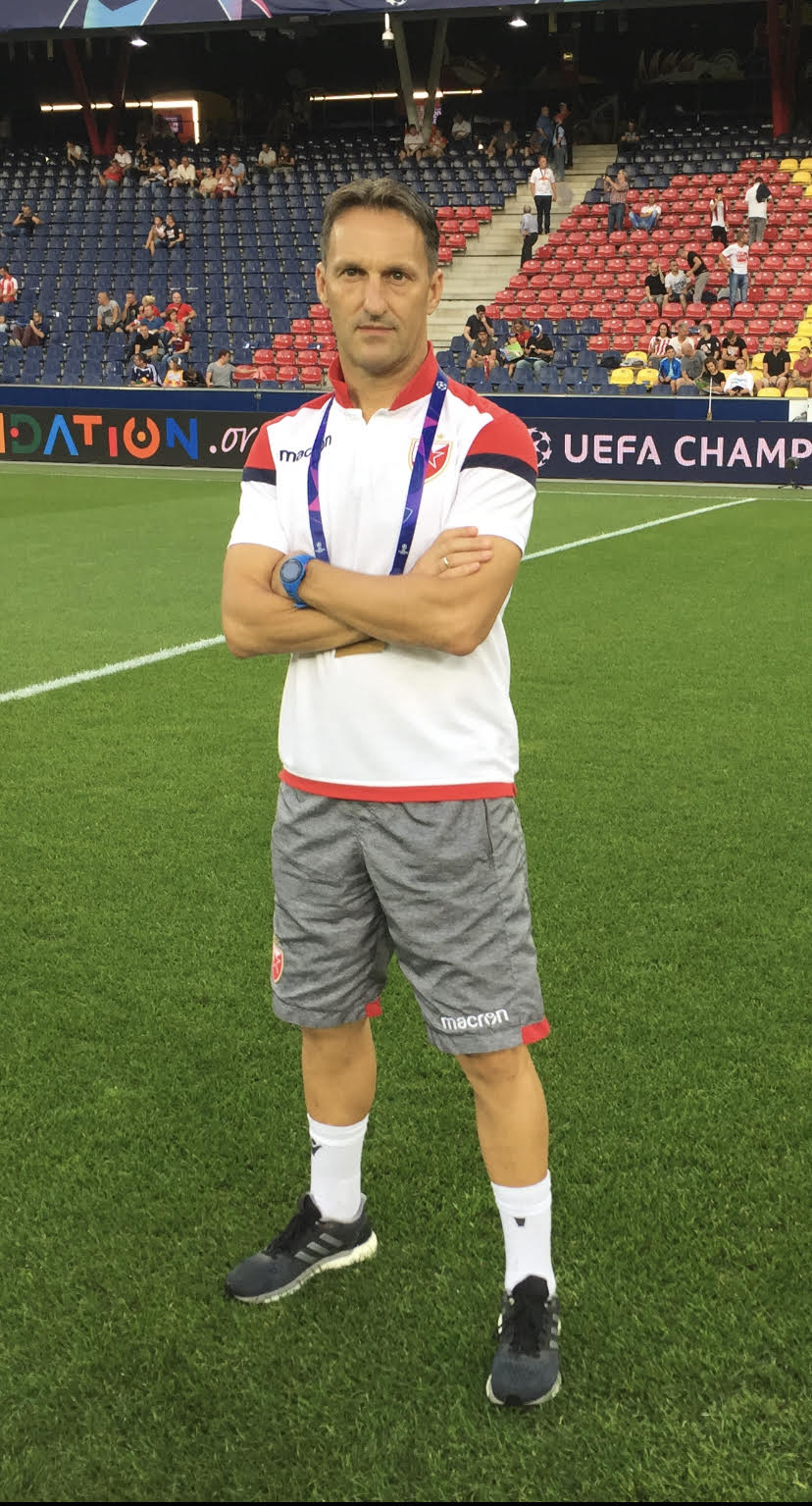
- Janković with Red Star Belgrade in 2018

Personal information
- Date of birth: 1 August 1970 (age 56)
- Place of birth: Smederevo, SFR Yugoslavia
- Height: 1.75 m (5 ft 9 in)
- Position: Defender

Youth career
- 1980–1981: Smederevo
- 1981–1982: Železničar Inđija
- 1982–1983: Inđija
- 1983–1986: Partizan
- 1986–1988: FK Rad

Senior career*
| Years | Team | Apps | (Gls) |
| 1988–1996 | Železničar Inđija | | |

Managerial career
- 2009–2010: Voždovac (assistant)
- 2010–2011: Voždovac
- 2011: Bežanija (assistant)
- 2012–2015: Čukarički (assistant)
- 2015–2016: Omonia (assistant)
- 2016–2017: Panionios (assistant)
- 2017–2019: Red Star Belgrade (assistant)
- 2021: OFK Titograd
- 2021–2022: Petrovac
- 2022: Dečić
- 2023: Riterai
- 2023: Sutjeska Nikšić
- 2025: Velež Mostar
- * Club domestic league appearances and goals

Vladimir Janković (Serbian Cyrillic: Владимир Јанковић; born 1 August 1970) is a Serbian professional football manager and former player.

== Club career ==
Born in Smederevo, city in Eastern Serbia on the Danube river, Janković started playing for the local youth team in 1980 at the age of 10. He then moved to Inđija where he played for both local FK Železničar and FK Agrounija, respectively. In 1983 Janković joined FK Partizan, one of two Serbia's biggest teams. He spent three years with Belgrade side before joining FK Rad. After spending two years in Rad's youth team, he moved back to Inđija to start his senior career with FK Železničar, where he played until 1996 when he started his futsal career with KMF Dorćol which he ended with KMF Zemun in 2004.

== Managerial career ==
After he retired from professional playing, Janković's passion for the game of football led him into managerial waters. He started as an individual coach in Athens, Greece in 2000. A year later, he started coaching grassroots futsal team of KMF Mondial in Belgrade, Serbia whilst still playing futsal himself. His first breakthrough happened in 2006 when he became a personal coach in FC Dinamo Kiyv from Ukraine. He stayed in Ukraine for a year when, in 2007, he moved back to Serbia to be a personal coach of professional players.

=== 2009-2011 FK Voždovac and FK Bežanija ===
In 2009, Janković was appointed assistant manager of FK Voždovac from Belgrade. In 2010, he was named manager of FK Voždovac and he spent a season 2010-11 as a head coach of the club whilst they were competing in Serbian League Belgrade, a third-ranked competition in Serbia. He then briefly worked as an assistant manager of FK Bežanija which were competing in the Serbian First League, second-division of Serbian football league.

=== 2012-15 FK Čukarički and collaboration with Milojević ===
In February 2012, Vladan Milojević was appointed manager of FK Čukarički from Belgrade and, per suggestion by Darko Tešović, he invited Janković to join him as an assistant manager. This is how a seven and a half year-long coaching collaboration began which would result in becoming one of the best coaching duos in Serbian modern football history.

When the tandem Milojević-Janković took over FK Čukarički, this team was at the bottom of Serbian First League facing a relegation to Serbian League Belgrade. Alongside Milojević, Janković managed to promote the team to Serbian SuperLiga, a highest-level of competition in Serbia, in 2013. They went on to win 2014-15 Serbian Cup with FK Čukarički with a win over FK Partizan in the finals at Rajko Mitić Stadium, thus making club's history, as this was the first trophy in their 89-year existence. Milojević and Janković both left the club in October 2015, only to take over AC Omonia Nicosia from Cyprus in November of the aforementioned year.

=== 2015-16 AC Omonia Nicosia ===
In 2015–16 season, Janković, as an assistant manager of AC Omonia Nicosia, won a silver medal in Cypriot Cup with the club following a defeat from Apollon Limassol FC in the finals. After spending six months with the club, both coaches, Milojević and Janković, left Cypriot side to take over Panionios F.C. from Greece.

=== 2016-17 Panionios F.C. ===
Janković spent the entire 2016–17 season with Greek side assisting Milojević and the club, led by them, spent most of the Super League Greece in second place right behind Olympiacos F.C. Panionios F.C. finished the season as the 5th runner-up in Super League Greece and qualified for UEFA Europa League second qualifying round.

=== 2017-18 Red Star Belgrade and UEFA Europa League success ===
Together with Milojević, Janković assumed charge of Red Star Belgrade in the summer of 2017, again, as Miliojević's right-hand man. Under the duo's leadership Belgrade club won 2017-18 Serbian SuperLiga title. Red Star Belgrade also made enormous success in Europe as they reached Round of 32 of UEFA Europa League. This was the first time they've played UEFA Europa League group stage since its rebranding, having last participated in the 2007-08 UEFA Cup as well as the first time in 25 years that Belgrade side have played a knockout phase of any European competition after finishing second runner-up in the Group H behind Arsenal F.C. Red Star Belgrade also became the first team ever to reach Knockout phase (round of 32) of the UEFA Europa League having started the competition from the first qualifying round.

=== 2018-19 UEFA Champions League and Red Star's third star ===
During Janković's second season as assistant manager, Red Star Belgrade achieved remarkable results. The club reached UEFA Champions League Group Stage and, by doing so, have crossed all stages from the first qualifying round to the group stage becoming the first team to ever do that since the introduction of the four rounds of qualifications. Moreover, in eight qualifying matches Serbian champion wasn't defeated. Red Star Belgrade went on to beat the later champion Liverpool at home with 2–0.

In Serbian SuperLiga, Red Star Belgrade won the competition once again reaching their 30th league title in total, hence deserving the right to pin a third star above their football emblem.

=== 2019-20 Qualifying for UEFA Champions League again and departure from Red Star ===
Janković's third season with Red Star Belgrade began with the same triumph as the previous. Red Star qualified for UEFA Champions League once more, again from the first qualifying round, making it for the third consecutive time they qualified for the group stage of either UEFA Europa League or UEFA Champions League from round one.

Janković and Milojević both left Red Star Belgrade on December 19, 2019, and ended their long-term collaboration. Milojević assumed charge of Saudi Professional League team Al-Ahli and Janković went on to pursue a solo career. At the time of the departure of two coaches, the team was at the top of the league.

== Managerial statistics ==
As of match played 31 May 2025

| Team | Nat | From | To | Record | | | | | | | |
| Team | Nat | From | To | P | W | D | L | GF | GA | GD | W% |
|---|---|---|---|---|---|---|---|---|---|---|---|
| OFK Titograd | (Montenegro) | 9 April 2021 | 30 June 2021 | 9 | 2 | 4 | 3 | 6 | 8 | −2 | 22.2 |
| Petrovac | (Montenegro) | 1 September 2021 | 25 February 2022 | 14 | 4 | 6 | 4 | 23 | 20 | +3 | 28.6 |
| Dečić | (Montenegro) | 15 April 2022 | 22 September 2022 | 22 | 11 | 4 | 7 | 39 | 32 | +7 | 50.0 |
| Riterai | (Lithuania) | 31 March 2023 | 26 July 2023 | 20 | 4 | 7 | 9 | 22 | 31 | −9 | 20.0 |
| Sutjeska Nikšić | (Montenegro) | 10 August 2023 | 26 December 2023 | 13 | 4 | 6 | 3 | 19 | 14 | +5 | 30.8 |
| Velež Mostar | (Bosnia and Herzegovina) | 20 April 2025 | 11 June 2025 | 7 | 2 | 2 | 3 | 9 | 8 | +1 | 28.6 |
| Total | | | | 85 | 27 | 29 | 29 | 118 | 113 | +5 | 31.8 |
