= Stadion Mitar Mićo Goliš =

Association football stadium in Petrovac, Montenegro

Coordinates: 42.203591°N 18.945928°E

- Interactive map of Stadion Mitar Mićo Goliš
- Location: Petrovac, Montenegro
- Owner: Municipality Budva
- Capacity: 1,630 (all-seated)
- Surface: Grass

Construction
- Opened: 1969
- Renovated: 2013

Tenants
- OFK Petrovac, Montenegro women's national football team

Stadion Mitar Mićo Goliš, formerly known as Stadion pod Malim brdom, is a football stadium in Petrovac, Montenegro. The stadium has a capacity of 1,630 seats and, from 2013, it is eligible for the UEFA international matches.

== History ==
Stadium pod Malim brdom was built in 1969 with the founding of OFK Petrovac. It's situated near the coast of the Adriatic Sea, and in Montenegrin the translation of the stadium name is Under the Little Hill. The stadium was reconstructed three times, in 2001, 2006 and 2013. After the last renovation, the stadium met UEFA standards. The stadium has two fully seated stands, floodlights and other facilities.
Stadion pod Malim brdom hosted its first European game in July 2014.

== Tenants ==
Stadium is home of OFK Petrovac, a member of the Montenegrin First League. Except that, their home games on Stadion pod Malim brdom plays the Montenegro women's national football team.
First game of European competitions in Petrovac played FK Lovćen and FK Željezničar Sarajevo in the 2014–15 UEFA Europa League. Until now, the stadium hosted games of FK Rudar in the UEFA Champions League qualifiers and FK Bokelj in the UEFA Europa League.

== See also ==
- Petrovac
- OFK Petrovac
- Budva
