= Kristijan Vulaj =

Montenegrin footballer (born 1998)

Personal information
- Full name: Kristijan Vulaj
- Date of birth: 25 June 1998 (age 28)
- Place of birth: Montenegro, FR Yugoslavia
- Height: 1.82 m (6 ft 0 in)
- Position: Attacking midfielder

Team information
- Current team: Dečić Tuzi
- Number: 32

Senior career*
Years	Team	Apps	(Gls)
2015–2018	Dečić	51	(1)
2018–2019	Petrovac	27	(2)
2019–2022	Dečić	69	(22)
2022–2023	Vllaznia Shkodër	7	(0)
2023–	Dečić Tuzi	17	(1)
2024–2025	→ Mladost DG (loan)	23	(1)

International career^{‡}
2016	Montenegro U19	1	(0)
2021–	Montenegro	1	(0)
- * Club domestic league appearances and goals as of 3 April 2025 ‡ National team caps and goals as of 17:07, 27 March 2021 (UTC)

Kristijan Vulaj (born 25 June 1998) is a Montenegrin footballer who plays as a midfielder for Dečić Tuzi and the Montenegro national team.

== Career ==
Vulaj made his international debut for Montenegro on 27 March 2021 in the 2022 FIFA World Cup qualifiers, coming on as a substitute at 27th minute in place of injured Marko Bakić against Gibraltar. The home match finished as a 4–1 win.

== Personal life ==
Vulaj is of Albanian descent.

== Career statistics ==
=== International ===
As of 27 March 2021

Montenegro
Year	Apps	Goals
2021	1	0
Total	1	0
