= Stadion Tuško Polje =

Football stadium in Tuzi, Podgorica, Montenegro

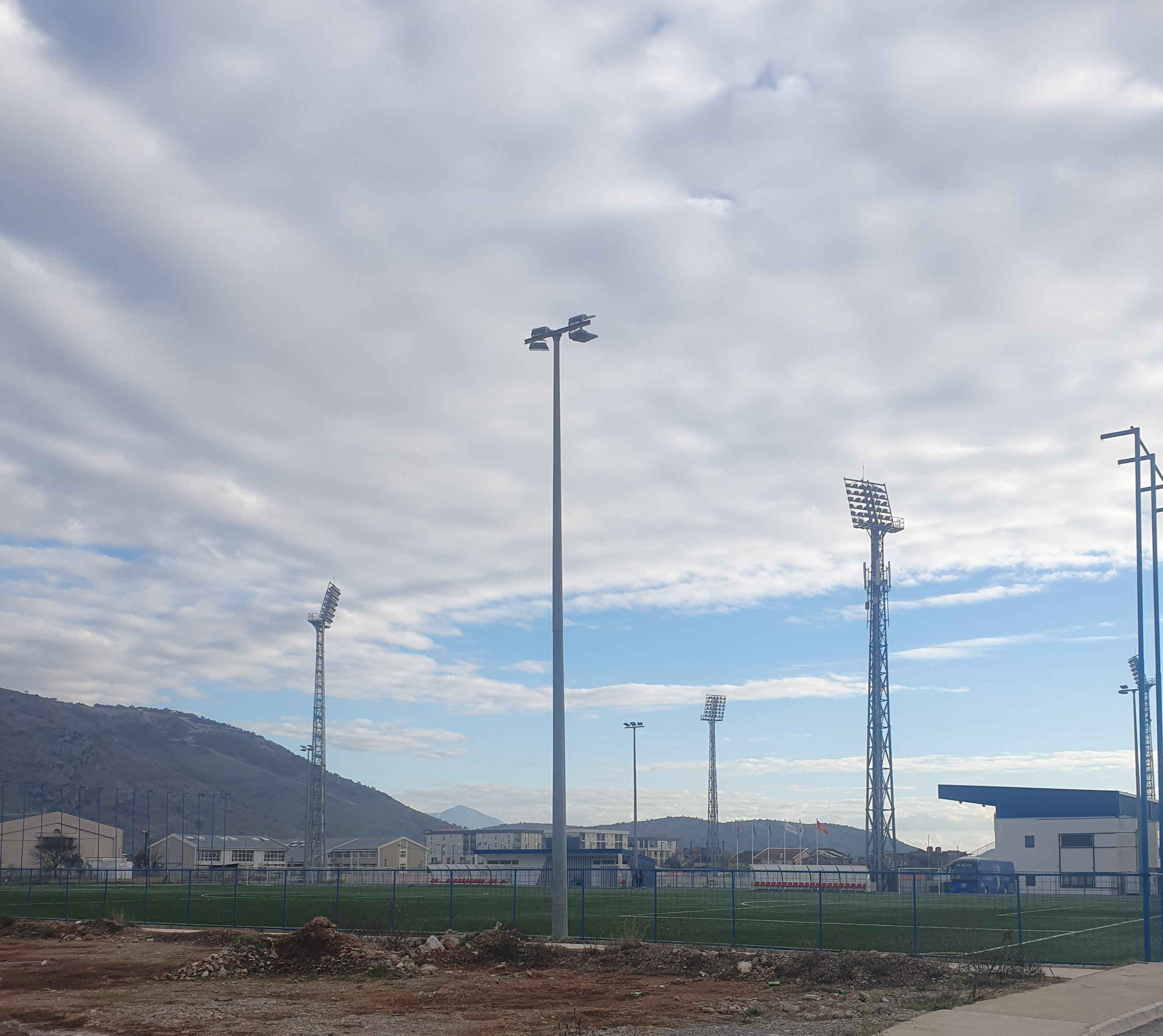
- Interactive map of Stadion Tuško Polje
- Full name: Stadion Tuško Polje
- Location: Tuzi, Montenegro
- Coordinates: 42°21′35.7″N 19°19′34.8″E
- Owner: Tuzi Urban Municipality
- Capacity: 1,001
- Surface: grass
- Field size: 110 m × 70 m (360 ft × 230 ft)

Construction
- Built: 2006
- Renovated: 2016
- Expanded: 2013

Tenant
- FK Dečić

Stadion Tuško Polje (nicknamed Arena Besa) is a football stadium in Tuzi, Montenegro. It is used for football matches and is the home ground of FK Dečić.

== History ==
During the decades, at location of Stadion Tuško Polje existed football pitch which didn't meet criteria for official games. So, FK Dečić, a football club from Tuzi, played their home games in Podgorica or Golubovci. But in 2006, a new stadium was built. The first game played at Stadium ARENA BESA was played on 19 August 2006. At second week of the 2006-07 Montenegrin First League, FK Dečić hosted Montenegrin strongest side FK Budućnost (0-3) in front of 3,000 spectators. That was a record attendance at the stadium.

The stadium was renovated several times, so today it has a capacity of 2,000 seats on two stands. Next phase of work will be the expansion of the western stand and after that, the capacity of the stadium will be 3,000 seats.

=== Attendances ===
Below is the list of attendances at FK Dečić home games on ARENA BESA by every single season.

Season	League	Average	Total	Games	Highest	Lowest
2006/07	Montenegrin First League	1,141	19,400	17	3,000 (vs. Budućnost)	500 (vs. Mladost)
2007/08	Montenegrin First League	738	11,800	16	2,000 (vs. Budućnost)	300 (vs. Grbalj)
2008/09	Montenegrin First League	865	14,700	17	1,500 (vs. Budućnost)	400 (vs. Sutjeska)
2009/10	Montenegrin First League	807	12,100	15	1,500 (vs. Budućnost)	300 (vs. Lovćen)
2010/11	Montenegrin First League	906	14,500	16	2,000 (vs. Budućnost)	500 (vs. Petrovac)
2011/12	Montenegrin First League	775	12,400	16	1,500 (vs. Jedinstvo)	300 (vs. Bokelj)
2012/13	Montenegrin Second League	447	6,700	15	700 (vs. Zabjelo)	100 (vs. Zora)
2013/14	Montenegrin First League	794	12,700	16	2,000 (vs. Budućnost)	200 (vs. Grbalj)
2014/15	Montenegrin Second League	378	6,800	18	1,000 (vs. Mogren)	150 (vs. Radnički)
2015/16	Montenegrin First League	1,060	10,600	10	1,500 (vs. Bokelj)	300 (vs. Grbalj)

== Pitch and conditions ==
The pitch measures 110 x 70 meters. The stadium didn't met UEFA criteria for European competitions. In addition to the main field is an auxiliary field with artificial grass that is used for competitions in the junior categories.

== See also ==
- FK Dečić
- Tuzi
- Podgorica
