= Nikola Dabanović =

Montenegrin football referee

- Born: 18 December 1981 (age 44); Podgorica, SR Montenegro, SFR Yugoslavia

Domestic
Years	League	Role
2006–	Montenegrin First League	Referee

International
Years	League	Role
2009–	FIFA listed	Referee

Nikola Dabanović (Montenegrin Cyrillic: Никола Дабановић; born 18 December 1981) is a Montenegrin football referee who officiates in the Montenegrin First League. He has been a FIFA referee since 2009, and is ranked as a UEFA first category referee.

== Refereeing career ==
In 2006, Dabanović began officiating in the Montenegrin First League. In 2009, he was put on the FIFA referees list. He officiated his first senior international match on 10 August 2011 between Bosnia and Herzegovina and Greece.

Dabanović was selected as an official for the 2014 UEFA European Under-17 Championship in Malta and the 2019 UEFA European Under-19 Championship in Armenia.

== Personal life ==
Dabanović was born in Podgorica, Montenegro. He works as an account manager.
