= FK Dečić =

Montenegrin association football club

Dečić
- Full name: Fudbalski klub Dečić Tuzi
- Nicknames: Kuqezinjtë (The Red and Blacks)
- Short name: DEČ
- Founded: 1926; 100 years ago
- Ground: Stadion Tuško Polje; Tuzi, Montenegro
- Capacity: 2,000
- Chairman: Pal Dreshaj
- Manager: Nebojša Jandrić
- League: Montenegrin First League
- 2025–26: Montenegrin First League, 4th of 10
Home colours	Away colours	Third colours

FK Dečić (Montenegrin: ФК Дечић; Albanian: KF Deçiq), known as Dečić Admiral Bet for sponsorship reasons, is a Montenegrin professional football club from Tuzi. Currently, the club is a member of the Montenegrin First League. It is a part of the Dečić sporting club.

== History ==
Founded in 1926, the club is named after the Dečić hill. The team only played non-league matches in the period before World War II. The first official competition in which FK Dečić participated was the lowest-tier Fourth League – Central, in which they participated until the beginning of the seventies. In that era, a big local rivalry between FK Dečić and neighbouring FK Zeta was born. The first significant success during the SFR Yugoslavia era was the Fourth League championship title in 1972–73, which meant promotion to the third-tier competition Montenegrin Republic League.

For most of their seasons until the end of the 20th century, FK Dečić was in the Republic League, with few relegations to the Fourth League. Dečić's best successes were in the 1988–89 season, when they finished in third place in the Montenegrin Republic League and 1989–90, when they were runners-up. Dečić had their best result to date in 2003–04. After a struggle against FK Lovćen, the team from Tuzi won the championship title in the Republic League and secured a historical first promotion to the Yugoslav Second League. FK Dečić debuted in the Second League in the 2004-05 season, and finished high, in third place. The next year, Dečić finished in seventh place.

After Montenegrin independence, FK Dečić became a member of the Montenegrin First League (season 2006-07), which was a historical result of the team from Tuzi. Dečić played its first game in the First League on 12 August 2006, a 1–1 draw against FK Mogren in Budva. A week later, FK Dečić played its first top-division match at the renovated stadium in Tuzi against FK Budućnost, a 0–3 result in front of 3,000 spectators. That was the record attendance on FK Dečić home games.
Up to 2012, FK Dečić spent six consecutive seasons in the First League. After the 2011–12 season, the team was relegated to the Montenegrin Second League.

In the following seasons, the club went back and forth with promotions and relegations between the First and Second League, with a final return to the top division in the 2015-16 season, after a win in the First League playoff matches against FK Mogren (2–1; 5–0). During the next two seasons, with head coaches Viktor Trenevski and Edis Mulalić, FK Dečić made significant results in the First League, finishing in the upper half of the table. An era of good results came to an end after the 2017-18 season, as FK Dečić finished at the bottom and was relegated to the Second League.

Two years later, the team from Tuzi, as the champion of the 2019-20 Montenegrin Second League, made another comeback to the top tier. They would start the 2020–21 Montenegrin First League with a promising 2–0 win at home against the defending Montenegrin First League champions FK Budućnost. That season was the most successful start to a season in the club's history.

=== Talent production ===
The best-known player to come up through the club is Refik Šabanadžović, who later went on to a notable career with Željezničar and Red Star Belgrade, and won the UEFA Champions League. Other notable players are Ardian Đokaj and Sanibal Orahovac.

=== First League record ===
For the first time, Dečić played in the Montenegrin First League in the 2006–07 season. Below is a list of FK Dečić scores in the First League by every single season.

Season	Pos	G	W	D	L	GF	GA
2006–07	10	33	8	10	15	29	46
2007–08	7	33	10	8	15	26	37
2008–09	11	33	9	4	20	23	45
2009–10	9	33	8	11	14	27	35
2010–11	6	33	10	9	14	24	33
2011–12	10	33	10	4	19	34	51
2013–14	12	33	5	9	19	32	61
2015–16	6	33	11	6	16	38	49
2016–17	5	33	14	8	11	27	32
2017–18	12	36	3	12	21	25	64
2020–21	3	36	13	15	8	39	28
2021–22	3	36	15	11	10	54	44
2022–23	4	36	12	14	10	44	37
2023–24	1	36	20	10	6	55	27
2024–25	4	35	10	17	8	34	31

== Honours ==
- Montenegrin First League
  - Winners (1): 2023–24
- Montenegrin Cup
  - Winners (1): 2024–25
  - Runners-up (3): 2020–21, 2021–22, 2025–26
- Montenegrin Second League
  - Winners (2): 2012–13, 2019–20
  - Runners-up (1): 2014–15
- Montenegrin Republic League
  - Winners (1): 2003–04
- Montenegrin Fourth League
  - Winners (6): 1971–72, 1975–76, 1982–83, 1986–87, 2001–02, 2002–03

== European record ==
Season	Competition	Round	Club	Home	Away	Aggregate
2021–22	UEFA Europa Conference League	1QR	(Kosovo) Drita	0–1	1–2	1–3
2022–23	UEFA Europa Conference League	1QR	(Belarus) Dinamo Minsk	1–2	1–1	2–3
2024–25	UEFA Champions League	1QR	(Wales) The New Saints	1–1	0–3	1–4
2024–25	UEFA Conference League	2QR	(Georgia (country)) Dinamo Batumi	0–0	2–0	2−0
2024–25	UEFA Conference League	3QR	(Finland) HJK	2–1 (a.e.t.)	0–1	2–2 (3–4 p)
2025–26	UEFA Conference League	1QR	(North Macedonia) Sileks	2–0	1–2	3–2
2025–26	UEFA Conference League	2QR	(Austria) Rapid Wien	0–2	2–4	2–6
2026–27	UEFA Conference League	1QR	(Latvia) Liepāja	1–2	0–1	1–3

Notes

- QR: Qualifying round

== Players ==
=== Current squad ===
As of 1 July 2026

Note: Flags indicate national team as defined under FIFA eligibility rules; some limited exceptions apply. Players may hold more than one non-FIFA nationality.

No.	Pos.	Nation	Player
3	DF	MNE	Dardan Lulgjuraj
9	FW	MNE	Mario Gjolaj
8	MF	MNE	Aleksa Ćetković
9	FW	MNE	Ilir Camaj
11	FW	MNE	Uroš Đuranović
14	MF	MNE	Aldin Adžović
15	DF	MNE	Pjetër Lulgjuraj
16	MF	MNE	Matija Božanović
17	DF	MNE	Leon Ujkaj
18	DF	MNE	Lazar Maraš
21	GK	MNE	Andrej Camaj
22	DF	MNE	Jonathan Dreshaj (captain)
23	FW	MNE	Siniša Stanisavić

No.	Pos.	Nation	Player
25	GK	MNE	Danilo Radošević
27	MF	MNE	Davor Kontić
29	DF	MNE	Nikola Braunović
32	FW	MNE	Balša Radusinović
33	GK	MNE	Miloš Dragojević
50	DF	MNE	Jovan Mugoša
55	FW	MNE	Romario Camaj
66	DF	MNE	Demir Krkanović
72	FW	MNE	Petar Ivanović
74	DF	MNE	Petar Pavlićević
77	MF	MNE	Halil Kajoshaj
88	MF	MNE	Medo Juković

=== Notable players ===
For the list of former and current players with Wikipedia article, please see Category:FK Dečić players.

Below is the list of FK Dečić players which have represented their countries at the full international level:

- (Socialist Federal Republic of Yugoslavia) Refik Šabanadžović
- (Montenegro) Fatos Beqiraj
- (Montenegro) Driton Camaj
- (Montenegro) Edvin Kuçi
- (Montenegro) Marko Tuçi
- (Montenegro) Kristijan Vulaj
- (Afghanistan) Modjieb Jamali
- (Moldova) Stanislav Namașco

== Historical list of coaches ==
- (Montenegro) Vojo Pejović (Jul 2006 - Sep 2006)
- (Montenegro) Mladen Vukičević (18 Sep 2006 – Jun 2007)
- (Montenegro) Bozidar Vuković (Jul 2007 - Jun 2009)
- (Montenegro) Ivan Čančarević (Jul 2009 – Dec 2009)
- (Montenegro) Slaviša Božičić (5 Jan 2010 – Jun 2010)
- (Montenegro) Mladen Vukičević (Jul 2010 – Sep 2011)
- (Montenegro) Bozidar Vuković (22 Sep 2011 - Jun 2012)
- (Montenegro) Fuad Krkanović (Jul 2012 – Jun 2013)
- (Czech Republic) Radim Nečas (Jul 2013 – Mar 2014)
- (Czech Republic) Pavel Malura (6 Mar 2014 – Apr 2014)
- (Montenegro) Fuad Krkanović (22 Apr 2014 – Jun 2015)
- (North Macedonia) Viktor Trenevski (Jul 2015 - Oct 2015)
- (Montenegro) Fuad Krkanović (28 Oct 2015 – Jun 2016)
- (Montenegro) Milija Savović (Jul 2016 – Sep 2016)
- (Bosnia and Herzegovina) Edis Mulalić (Sep 2016 - Mar 2017)
- (Montenegro) Fuad Krkanović (Mar 2017)
- (Bosnia and Herzegovina) Edis Mulalić (Mar 2017 - May 2017)
- (Montenegro) Fuad Krkanović (May 2017 – Jun 2017)
- (Montenegro) Mirko Marić (Jul 2017 – Dec 2017)
- (North Macedonia) Viktor Trenevski (Jan 2018 - May 2018)
- (Montenegro) Fuad Krkanović (May 2018 – Jul 2020)
- (Bosnia and Herzegovina) Edis Mulalić (Jul 2020 – Sep 2021)
- (Montenegro) Miljan Radović (Sep 2021 – Apr 2022)
- (Serbia) Vladimir Janković (Apr 2022 – Sep 2022)
- (Montenegro) Derviš Hadžiosmanović (Sep 2022 – Dec 2022)
- (Serbia) Vladimir Gaćinović (Jan 2023 – Mar 2023)
- (Slovakia) Juraj Jarábek (Mar 2023 – Sep 2023)
- (Montenegro) Milorad Peković (Sep 2023 – Oct 2024)
- (Bosnia and Herzegovina) Edis Mulalić (Oct 2024 – Mar 2025)
- (Montenegro) Nenad Brnović (Mar 2025 – Apr 2025)
- (Serbia) Nebojša Jandrić (Apr 2025 – Jun 2026)
- (Montenegro) Ivan Brnović (Jun 2026 – present)
- Official sponsor: Castellana
- Official kit supplier: Macron

== Stadium ==
FK Dečić's home ground is Stadion Tuško Polje, built in 2006. The stadium was renovated several times; today it has a capacity of 2,000 spectators between two stands. The next phase of works will be the expansion of the western stand, and after that, capacity of the stadium will be 3,000 seats. In addition to the main field, there is an auxiliary field with artificial grass that is used for competitions in the junior categories.

== See also ==
- KB Deçiq
- Tuzi
- Podgorica
- Montenegrin First League
- Montenegrin clubs in Yugoslav football competitions (1946–2006)
