= Draško Božović =

Montenegrin footballer

Personal information
- Full name: Draško Božović
- Date of birth: 30 June 1988 (age 38)
- Place of birth: Titograd, SFR Yugoslavia
- Height: 1.83 m (6 ft 0 in)
- Position: Midfielder

Team information
- Current team: Dečić
- Number: 7

Youth career
- 1998–2005: Budućnost Podgorica

Senior career*
Years	Team	Apps	(Gls)
2005–2008	Budućnost	19	(0)
2008–2011	Mogren	67	(4)
2011–2012	Budućnost	12	(0)
2012–2013	Hapoel Be'er Sheva	2	(0)
2013	Mladost Podgorica	10	(1)
2013–2014	Domžale	6	(0)
2014–2015	Lovćen	29	(9)
2015	Sutjeska	15	(5)
2015–2016	Rudar Pljevlja	25	(3)
2016	Sutjeska	13	(0)
2017–2018	Prishtina	27	(3)
2018–2021	Budućnost	81	(24)
2021–	Dečić	150	(25)

International career^{‡}
2007–2010	Montenegro U21	15	(1)
2010–2022	Montenegro	13	(0)
- * Club domestic league appearances and goals as of 17 June 2026 ‡ National team caps and goals as of 19 April 2023

Draško Božović (Cyrillic: Драшко Божовић; born 30 June 1988) is a Montenegrin footballer who plays for Dečić.

== Club career ==
He played for Sutjeska Nikšić, FK Budućnost, FK Mogren and FK Mladost in the Montenegrin First League.

== International career ==
Božović made his debut for Montenegro in an August 2010 friendly match against Northern Ireland and has earned a total of 13 caps, scoring no goals. His final international was a June 2022 Nations League match away against Romania.
