= OFK Petrovac =

Petrovac
- Full name: Omladinski fudbalski klub Petrovac
- Nickname: Nebesko plavi (The Sky-Blues)
- Founded: 1969; 57 years ago (as FK Nafta)
- Ground: Stadion Mitar Mićo Goliš
- Capacity: 1,630
- Chairman: Balša Mitrović
- Manager: Zoran Đurašković
- League: Montenegrin First League
- 2025–26: Montenegrin First League, 3rd of 10
Home colours	Away colours	Third colours

OFK Petrovac is a professional football club based in Petrovac, Montenegro. They currently compete in the First League of Montenegro.

== History ==
OFK Petrovac was founded in 1969, under the name FK Nafta. During the first season, they played in the lowest-tier competition - Fourth League - South. At season 1971–72, FK Nafta became a runner-up in Fourth League championship, which gained them promotion to Montenegrin Republic League.
From 1972 until the end of the century, most of the seasons, OFK Petrovac played in Montenegrin Republic League, with few relegations and comebacks from lower rank. Among the historical seasons in the club's history was 2000–01. As a second-placed team in Montenegrin Republic League, OFK Petrovac gained promotion to Yugoslav Second League. They played five consecutive seasons in Second League, until the split of Serbia and Montenegro Federation.
After Montenegrin independence, OFK Petrovac was among 12 teams which are chosen to play in the first season of Montenegrin First League (2006–07).
Historical success in club's history, OFK Petrovac made at season 2008–09. They won the trophy of winner of the Montenegrin Cup, after extra-time final game against FK Lovćen in Podgorica (1–0). With the Cup trophy, OFK Petrovac gained participation in UEFA Europa League in season 2009–10. On their European debut, OFK Petrovac won against Anorthosis Famagusta, but were eliminated in the third leg against Sturm Graz.
OFK Petrovac played another final of the Montenegrin Cup on season 2014–15, but this time were defeated in extra time by Mladost (1–2).
Since 2006, OFK Petrovac played all the seasons of Montenegrin First League, without any relegation. Best placement, team from Petrovac made at seasons 2011–12 and 2013–14, finishing as a fifth-placed team.

=== First League Record ===
For the first time, OFK Petrovac played in Montenegrin First League on season 2006–07. Below is a list of OFK Petrovac scores in First League by every single season.

Season	Pos	G	W	D	L	GF	GA
2006–07	6	33	10	10	13	24	37
2007–08	8	33	8	12	13	36	46
2008–09	6	33	12	5	16	42	56
2009–10	8	33	10	6	17	38	49
2010–11	9	33	8	11	14	26	38
2011–12	5	33	13	9	11	36	39
2012–13	7	33	8	14	11	36	42
2013–14	5	33	11	13	9	37	31
2014–15	7	33	12	7	14	30	35
2015–16	11	33	8	9	16	33	51
2016–17	9	33	11	6	16	30	50
2017–18	9	36	9	11	16	25	40
2018–19	7	36	13	8	15	40	45
2019–20	6	31	9	10	12	30	46
2020–21	9	36	7	11	18	29	45
2021–22	7	36	10	13	13	47	60
2022–23	6	36	11	12	13	50	57
2023–24	6	36	11	15	10	42	40
2024–25	2	36	17	9	10	50	37
2025–26	3	36	13	12	11	44	36

=== OFK Petrovac in European competitions ===
Season	Competition	Round	Club	Home	Away	Aggregate
2009–10	UEFA Europa League	2QR	(Cyprus) Anorthosis Famagusta	3–1 (a.e.t.)	1–2	4–3
2009–10	UEFA Europa League	3QR	(Austria) Sturm Graz	1–2	0–5	1–7
2026–27	UEFA Conference League	1QR	(Lithuania) Žalgiris	1–3	1–2	2–5

== Honours ==
- Montenegrin Cup
  - Winners (1): 2008–09
  - Runners-up (1): 2014–15

== Players ==
=== Current squad ===
As of 25 February 2026

Note: Flags indicate national team as defined under FIFA eligibility rules; some limited exceptions apply. Players may hold more than one non-FIFA nationality.

No.	Pos.	Nation	Player
1	GK	MNE	Suad Ličina
4	MF	MNE	Žarko Popović
5	DF	MNE	Aleksandar Kapisoda
7	MF	MNE	Nikola Zvrko
8	MF	MNE	Danilo Bakić
9	FW	MNE	Boban Đorđević
10	FW	BIH	Adnan Bašić
11	FW	MNE	Nemanja Belaković
13	DF	MNE	Marko Franeta
14	MF	MNE	Nikola Balević
15	DF	MNE	Luka Šćekić
17	FW	SRB	Savo Arambašić
18	MF	SRB	Stefan Fićović

No.	Pos.	Nation	Player
19	DF	MNE	Janko Vukićević
21	MF	MNE	Nemanja Carević
22	DF	MNE	Dragan Miranović
23	MF	MNE	Zaim Divanović
25	GK	MNE	Marko Kordić
27	MF	MNE	Đorđe Fabris
29	DF	MNE	Danilo Pešukić
32	MF	MNE	Strahinja Tešović
33	DF	MNE	Dejan Boljević (captain)
44	DF	MNE	Marko Merdović
98	FW	MNE	Vladan Kordić
99	DF	MNE	Marko Roganović

=== Out on loan ===
Note: Flags indicate national team as defined under FIFA eligibility rules; some limited exceptions apply. Players may hold more than one non-FIFA nationality.

No. / Pos. / Nation / Player	No. / Pos. / Nation / Player

=== Notable players ===
Below is the list of former Petrovac players who represented their countries at the full international level.

- (Socialist Federal Republic of Yugoslavia) Budimir Vujačić
- (Serbia and Montenegro) Goran Trobok
- (Serbia and Montenegro) (Montenegro) Igor Burzanović
- (Montenegro) Miloš Dragojević
- (Montenegro) Vladimir Vujović
- (Montenegro) Nemanja Sekulić
- (Montenegro) Kristijan Vulaj
- (North Macedonia) Toni Meglenski

For the list of former and current players with Wikipedia article, please see Category:OFK Petrovac players.

== Managerial history ==
- (Montenegro) Milorad Malovrazić (Jun 2006 – Mar 2008)
- (Montenegro) Obren Sarić (21 Mar 2008 – Oct 2008)
- (Montenegro) Aleksandar Miljenović (20 Oct 2008 – Jun 2009)
- (Montenegro) Milan Vraneš (Jul 2009 – Dec 2009)
- (Montenegro) Milovan Minja Prelević (Dec 2009)
- (Montenegro) Milorad Malovrazić (25 Dec 2009 – May 2010)
- (Montenegro) Dejan Mrvaljević (Jun 2010 – Aug 2010)
- (Montenegro) Dragoljub Đuretić (Sep 2010)
- (Montenegro) Milorad Malovrazić (1 Oct 2010 – Mar 2016)
- (Montenegro) Ivan Brnović (14 Mar 2016 – Jun 2016)
- (Montenegro) Aleksandar Nedović (17 Jun 2016 – May 2017)
- (Montenegro) Rudolf Marčić (May 2017 – Aug 2019)
- (Montenegro) Željko Mrvaljević (Aug 2019)
- (Montenegro) Nenad Vukčević (23 Sep 2019 – 29 Aug 2021)
- (Serbia) Vladimir Janković (1 Sep 2021 – 25 Feb 2022)
- (Montenegro) Nikola Rakojević (2 Mar 2022 – present)

== Stadium ==
OFK Petrovac plays its home games at Stadion Mitar Mićo Goliš, whose capacity is 1,630 seats. Stadium is built near the coast of Adriatic Sea. It was reconstructed during the 2013 and now is eligible for UEFA international matches.
The stadium has two all-seated stands, floodlights and other facilities.

== See also ==
- Petrovac
- Montenegrin First League
- Montenegrin clubs in Yugoslav football competitions (1946–2006)
