= List of Serbian football transfers summer 2012 =

This is a list of transfers in Serbian football for the 2012 summer transfer window. Only moves featuring a Serbian SuperLiga side are listed. The order by which the clubs are listed is equal to the classification of the SuperLiga at the end of the previous season, 2011–12.

== Serbian SuperLiga ==
=== Partizan ===
In: Note: Flags indicate national team as defined under FIFA eligibility rules; some limited exceptions apply. Players may hold more than one non-FIFA nationality.

No.	Pos.	Nation	Player}
14	MF	SRB	Darko Brašanac (loan return from FK Smederevo)
39	MF	SRB	Miloš Jojić (loan return from FK Teleoptik)
27	FW	LBA	Mohamed Zubya (from (Kuwait) Al-Arabi)
19	DF	SRB	Branko Pauljević (from Hajduk Kula)
8	MF	SRB	Goran Lovre (free, last with (England) Barnsley)
12	FW	SRB	Stefan Šćepović (from (Israel) Hapoel Acre)
77	MF	SRB	Filip Knežević (from Borac Čačak)
23	MF	SRB	Filip Marković (from FK Teleoptik)
37	DF	MKD	Stefan Aškovski (from FK Teleoptik)
45	FW	SRB	Aleksandar Mitrović (from FK Teleoptik)
17	DF	SRB	Sreten Sretenović (from (Slovenia) Olimpija Ljubljana)
—	DF	MNE	Žarko Tomašević (from (Portugal) Nacional da Madeira)

Out: Note: Flags indicate national team as defined under FIFA eligibility rules; some limited exceptions apply. Players may hold more than one non-FIFA nationality.

No.	Pos.	Nation	Player
26	FW	SEN	Lamine Diarra (to (Turkey) Antalyaspor)
24	DF	SRB	Nemanja Rnić (released)
23	MF	SRB	Aleksandar Davidov (on loan to (Israel) Bnei Sakhnin, was on loan to (Israel) Hapoel Acre)
14	FW	SRB	Nikola Trujić (on loan to Napredak Kruševac, was on loan to (Israel) Hapoel Acre)
44	DF	BRA	Anderson Marques (to (Brazil) Monte Azul)
—	DF	MNE	Igor Zonjić (on loan to FK Teleoptik, previously brought from Banat Zrenjanin)
1	GK	SRB	Živko Živković (on loan to FK Teleoptik)
5	DF	SRB	Stefan Savić (on loan to FK Teleoptik)
—	MF	BIH	Nikola Popara (to Spartak Subotica, previously on loan at Teleoptik)
17	MF	CAF	David Manga (on loan to (Israel) Hapoel Ramat Gan)
25	MF	SRB	Stefan Babović (to (Spain) Real Zaragoza)
13	DF	SRB	Nikola Aksentijević (to (Netherlands) Vitesse)

=== Red Star Belgrade ===
In: Note: Flags indicate national team as defined under FIFA eligibility rules; some limited exceptions apply. Players may hold more than one non-FIFA nationality.

No.	Pos.	Nation	Player
3	DF	SRB	Ljubo Nenadić (from Radnički 1923)
34	MF	SRB	Stevan Luković (from FK Sopot)
5	DF	SRB	Uroš Spajić (loan return from FK Sopot)
9	FW	AUS	Eli Babalj (from (Australia) Melbourne Heart)
15	DF	MNE	Milan Jovanović (from (Russia) Spartak Nalchik)
91	FW	SRB	Ognjen Mudrinski (from Jagodina)
10	MF	SRB	Nenad Milijaš (from (England) Wolverhampton Wanderers)
2	DF	SRB	Aleksandar Pantić (from Rad)

Out: Note: Flags indicate national team as defined under FIFA eligibility rules; some limited exceptions apply. Players may hold more than one non-FIFA nationality.

No.	Pos.	Nation	Player
5	DF	SRB	Uroš Ćosić (loan return to (Russia) CSKA Moscow)
—	DF	SRB	Milan Vilotić (to (Switzerland) Grasshopper)
—	DF	SRB	Bojan Đorđević (was on loan, now signed with Radnički Niš)
55	DF	SRB	Nikola Petković (to (Israel) Hapoel Tel Aviv)
—	DF	SRB	Dragoljub Srnić (on loan to Čukarički, was on loan at FK Sopot)
—	MF	SRB	Slavoljub Srnić (on loan to Čukarički, was on loan at FK Sopot)
19	FW	COL	Cristian Borja (loan return to (Brazil) Caxias do Sul, next signed with (Colombia) Santa Fe)
11	MF	BRA	Vinícius Pacheco (to (Brazil) Náutico)
3	DF	SRB	Duško Tošić (to (Turkey) Gençlerbirliği)
23	MF	SRB	Petar Đuričković (on loan to Radnički 1923)
18	FW	SRB	Ognjen Ožegović (on loan to Banat Zrenjanin)
—	MF	SRB	Vladan Binić (to Radnički Niš, was on loan at Spartak Subotica)
10	MF	BRA	Evandro Goebel (to (Portugal) Estoril)
24	DF	SRB	Filip Stojković (on loan to Banat)
34	MF	SRB	Stevan Luković (on loan to Kolubara)
30	DF	SRB	Danijel Mihajlović (to Jagodina)

=== FK Vojvodina ===
In: Note: Flags indicate national team as defined under FIFA eligibility rules; some limited exceptions apply. Players may hold more than one non-FIFA nationality.

No.	Pos.	Nation	Player
24	DF	SRB	Dejan Karan (loan return from Javor Ivanjica)
11	FW	BIH	Nemanja Bilbija (loan return from (Bosnia and Herzegovina) Borac Banja Luka)
2	DF	SRB	Nemanja Radoja (loan return from Cement Beočin)
21	FW	SRB	Miloš Deletić (from OFK Mladenovac)
1	GK	SRB	Srđan Žakula (from Radnički Sombor)
23	DF	SRB	Igor Đurić (from (United Arab Emirates) Al Sharjah SC)
4	MF	NED	Serginho Greene (from (Bulgaria) Levski Sofia)
37	DF	SRB	Đorđe Jokić (from (Russia) Dynamo Bryansk)
—	GK	SRB	Aleksandar Kesić (from FK Rad)
—	MF	SRB	Aleksandar Katai (loan extension from (Greece) Olympiacos)
8	FW	GHA	Yaw Antwi (loan return from FK Bežanija)
—	MF	MNE	Božidar Janjušević (from (Montenegro) Sutjeska Nikšić, next to youth team)

Out: Note: Flags indicate national team as defined under FIFA eligibility rules; some limited exceptions apply. Players may hold more than one non-FIFA nationality.

No.	Pos.	Nation	Player
—	DF	SRB	Dušan Nestorović (loan extension to (Montenegro) Rudar Pljevlja)
—	DF	SRB	Srđan Bečelić (on loan to (Montenegro) Sutjeska Nikšić, was on loan at Veternik)
11	MF	SRB	Slobodan Novaković (to Spartak Subotica)
9	FW	MNE	Šaleta Kordić (on loan to (Montenegro) Mladost Podgorica)
—	GK	SRB	Đorđe Lazović (on loan to Javor Ivanjica, was on loan at Dunav Stari Banovci)
26	DF	SRB	Vladimir Kovačević (on loan to Proleter Novi Sad)
4	MF	GHA	Stephen Appiah (end of contract)
—	FW	SRB	Vladimir Silađi (to Sloga Temerin)
1	GK	SRB	Budimir Janošević (to FK Rad)
26	FW	MNE	Đorđe Šušnjar (loan extension to (Montenegro) Sutjeska Nikšić)
—	FW	SRB	Brana Ilić (to (Greece) PAS Giannina, was on loan at (Kazakhstan) FC Aktobe)
19	DF	SRB	Milovan Milović (to Javor Ivanjica)
5	MF	SRB	Mirko Ivanić (on loan to Proleter Novi Sad)
8	FW	GHA	Yaw Antwi (on loan to FK Bežanija, was on loan at FK Metalac G.M.)

=== FK Jagodina ===
In: Note: Flags indicate national team as defined under FIFA eligibility rules; some limited exceptions apply. Players may hold more than one non-FIFA nationality.

No.	Pos.	Nation	Player
21	FW	SRB	Igor Dimitrijević (from Trgovački Jagodina)
23	MF	SRB	Miloš Lepović (from Radnički 1923)
39	FW	SRB	Slaviša Stojanović (from Smederevo)
28	MF	BRA	Marcio Teruel (from (El Salvador) FAS)
16	FW	POR	Marcelo Santiago (from (Portugal) Tondela)
7	MF	SRB	Milan Đurić (loan return from (Bosnia and Herzegovina) Radnik Bijeljina)
31	MF	SRB	Ivan Cvetković (from (Kazakhstan) FC Zhetysu)
14	MF	ESP	Francis Durán (from (Spain) Elche CF)
3	DF	SRB	Nikola Valentić (from (Russia) Sibir Novosibirsk)
55	DF	SRB	Ivan Dragičević (from Napredak Kruševac)
22	GK	SRB	Petar Jokić (from Trgovački Jagodina)

Out: Note: Flags indicate national team as defined under FIFA eligibility rules; some limited exceptions apply. Players may hold more than one non-FIFA nationality.

No.	Pos.	Nation	Player
22	DF	SRB	Marko Lukić (loan return to (Spain) Huesca)
11	MF	SRB	Saša Marjanović (to (Moldova) Sheriff Tiraspol)
12	GK	CRO	Marko Šimić (to (Iran) Sanat Naft)
14	MF	SRB	Miloš Krstić (to (Switzerland) FC Thun)
21	FW	SRB	Milutin Ivanović (to Radnički Niš)
7	MF	BIH	Esmir Ahmetović (on loan to (Bosnia and Herzegovina) Sloboda Tuzla)
—	MF	SRB	Predrag Đorđević (to Javor Ivanjica, was on loan at Sinđelić Niš)
77	MF	SLE	Lamin Suma (on loan to (Montenegro) Jedinstvo Bijelo Polje)
9	FW	SRB	Ognjen Mudrinski (to Red Star Belgrade)
16	MF	SRB	Jovan Timić (on loan to Trgovački Jagodina)
30	MF	SRB	Stefan Vukmirović (on loan to Jedinstvo Putevi)

=== Sloboda Užice ===
In: Note: Flags indicate national team as defined under FIFA eligibility rules; some limited exceptions apply. Players may hold more than one non-FIFA nationality.

No.	Pos.	Nation	Player
8	FW	BIH	Duško Stajić (from (Bosnia and Herzegovina) Borac Banja Luka)
31	DF	SRB	Darko Lovrić (from (Israel) Hapoel Ashkelon)
1	GK	SRB	Dejan Ranković (from Smederevo)
—	DF	SRB	Milan Ilić (from (Portugal) Santa Clara)
14	MF	SRB	Miloš Janićijević (from Sloga Kraljevo)
5	MF	SRB	Zoran Knežević (from (Russia) Gazovik Orenburg)
17	MF	BIH	Dario Purić (from (Bosnia and Herzegovina) Čelik Zenica)
—	MF	BIH	Ajdin Maksumić (from (Switzerland) FC Staad)

Out: Note: Flags indicate national team as defined under FIFA eligibility rules; some limited exceptions apply. Players may hold more than one non-FIFA nationality.

No.	Pos.	Nation	Player
3	MF	GHA	Francis Bossman (to (Azerbaijan) Ravan Baku)
8	MF	SRB	Vojislav Vranjković (to (Montenegro) Čelik Nikšić)
1	GK	MNE	Darko Božović (to (Iran) Zob Ahan Isfahan)
44	DF	LBR	Omega Roberts (to FK Smederevo)
—	DF	BIH	Jovan Vujanić (on loan to (Bosnia and Herzegovina) FK Modriča, was on loan at (Bosnia and Herzegovina) Slavija Sarajevo)

=== Radnički 1923 Kragujevac ===
In: Note: Flags indicate national team as defined under FIFA eligibility rules; some limited exceptions apply. Players may hold more than one non-FIFA nationality.

No.	Pos.	Nation	Player
16	FW	SRB	Bojan Zoranović (from Šumadija Aranđelovac)
21	MF	SRB	Petar Đuričković (on loan from Red Star Belgrade)
8	MF	SRB	Milan Svojić (from Metalac Gornji Milanovac)
31	MF	SRB	Srđan Simović (from Metalac Gornji Milanovac)
33	DF	SRB	Dragan Radosavljević (from (Cyprus) Aris Limassol)
1	GK	SRB	Marko Knežević (from Banat Zrenjanin)
19	FW	SRB	Predrag Sikimić (from (Russia) Ural Sverdlovsk)
11	FW	SRB	Ivan Pejčić (from Radnički Niš)
28	DF	SRB	Vladimir Otašević (from Spartak Subotica)
7	MF	SRB	Dušan Petronijević (from (Kazakhstan) Astana)
3	DF	SRB	Darko Fejsa (from Hajduk Kula)

Out: Note: Flags indicate national team as defined under FIFA eligibility rules; some limited exceptions apply. Players may hold more than one non-FIFA nationality.

No.	Pos.	Nation	Player
11	MF	SRB	Filip Kostić (to (Netherlands) Groningen)
33	DF	SRB	Ljubo Nenadić (to Red Star Belgrade)
30	GK	SRB	Danilo Pustinjaković (to Mladost Lučani)
7	MF	SRB	Nikola Simić (to (Montenegro) Čelik Nikšić)
16	FW	BIH	Stefan Udovičić (to (Bosnia and Herzegovina) Radnik Bijeljina)
—	DF	SRB	Danko Opančina (to Smederevo, was on loan at Pobeda Beloševac)
—	MF	SRB	Igor Krmar (to Smederevo, was on loan to (Bosnia and Herzegovina) Slavija Sarajevo)
8	MF	SRB	Miloš Lepović (to Jagodina)
21	FW	SRB	Predrag Živadinović (to Metalac Gornji Milanovac)
19	MF	SRB	Milan Vukašinović (to Smederevo)
99	GK	SRB	Hristijan Josifović (to Smederevo)
—	GK	SRB	Žarko Trifunović (on loan to Pobeda Beloševac)
9	FW	SRB	Miloš Đorđević (to FK Smederevo)
20	MF	SRB	Stefan Petrović (on loan to Pobeda Beloševac)
14	MF	SRB	Ivan Obrovac (to Hajduk Kula)
3	DF	SRB	Marko Ristić (released)
26	FW	SRB	Lazar Popović (on loan to Pobeda Beloševac)

=== Spartak Subotica ===
In: Note: Flags indicate national team as defined under FIFA eligibility rules; some limited exceptions apply. Players may hold more than one non-FIFA nationality.

No.	Pos.	Nation	Player
16	FW	SRB	Borko Veselinović (free, last with (China) Dalian Shide)
13	MF	SRB	Slobodan Novaković (from FK Vojvodina)
22	MF	BIH	Nikola Popara (from Partizan, was on loan at FK Teleoptik)
14	DF	SRB	Novica Milenović (from OFK Beograd)
24	DF	SRB	Goran Adamović (from (Montenegro) Budućnost Podgorica)

Out: Note: Flags indicate national team as defined under FIFA eligibility rules; some limited exceptions apply. Players may hold more than one non-FIFA nationality.

No.	Pos.	Nation	Player
13	MF	SRB	Vladan Binić (loan return to Red Star Belgrade, next moved to Radnički Niš)
—	GK	SRB	Nikola Mirković (on loan to (Bosnia and Herzegovina) Zvijezda Gradačac)
16	DF	SRB	Borko Novaković (to (Bosnia and Herzegovina) FK Leotar)
5	DF	SRB	Đorđe Đurić (to (Hungary) MTK Budapest)
—	DF	SRB	Miloš Bokić (on loan to FK Palić, was on loan at FK Senta)
21	DF	SRB	Bojan Bjedov (on loan to FK Palić)
5	DF	SRB	Vladimir Otašević (to Radnički 1923)
—	MF	SRB	Marko Stančetić (to RFK Novi Sad, was on loan at Radnički Sombor)
—	DF	SRB	Daniel Farkaš (loan extension to FK Senta)
—	DF	SRB	Nebojša Mezei (on loan to FK Palić, was on loan at Radnički Sombor)
—	FW	SRB	Miljan Ljubenović (on loan to FK Palić, previously brought from Sloga Kraljevo youth team)
—	GK	SRB	Nikola Ićitović (on loan to FK Palić, previously brought from Mladost Apatin)
—	DF	SRB	Luka Slijepčević (on loan to FK Palić, previously brought from FK Veternik)
—	FW	SRB	Đorđija Milić (on loan to FK Palić, previously brought from FK Senta)
—	FW	SRB	Đorđe Antonić (on loan to FK Palić, previously brought from FK Inđija)
3	DF	SRB	Milan Joksimović (to Jedinstvo Putevi)

=== OFK Beograd ===
In: Note: Flags indicate national team as defined under FIFA eligibility rules; some limited exceptions apply. Players may hold more than one non-FIFA nationality.

No.	Pos.	Nation	Player
11	FW	SRB	Aleksandar Čavrić (from Banat Zrenjanin)
8	MF	SRB	Veseljko Trivunović (from (Azerbaijan) Gabala)
19	FW	SRB	Vladimir Tufegdžić (from RFK Novi Sad)
7	FW	MNE	Dragan Bogavac (free, last with (Kazakhstan) FC Astana)
22	FW	SRB	Igor Stanojević (loan return from PKB Padinska Skela)
—	DF	SRB	Dušan Punoševac (from Napredak Kruševac, was on loan at PP Trstenik)
5	DF	MNE	Vladan Adžić (from (Montenegro) Rudar Pljevlja)
15	DF	SRB	Petar Golubović (from Red Star Belgrade youth)
—	MF	BIH	Nikola Danilović (from (Bosnia and Herzegovina) Sutjeska Foča)
16	FW	SRB	Ivica Jovanović (from (Montenegro) Rudar Pljevlja)
30	MF	SRB	Goran Brkić (loan return from FK Kolubara)
18	MF	MNE	Petar Grbić (on loan from (Greece) Olympiacos)
12	GK	MNE	Andrija Dragojević (loan return from OFK Mladenovac)
—	GK	SRB	Marko Matić (from FK Beograd)

Out: Note: Flags indicate national team as defined under FIFA eligibility rules; some limited exceptions apply. Players may hold more than one non-FIFA nationality.

No.	Pos.	Nation	Player
22	MF	BIH	Amer Osmanagić (to (Norway) Haugesund)
35	DF	SRB	Marko Milić (to (Bosnia and Herzegovina) Borac Banja Luka)
18	FW	SRB	Mladen Popović (to Hajduk Kula)
26	MF	SRB	Igor Jelić (to FK Novi Pazar)
42	MF	SRB	Uroš Sinđić (to FK Voždovac)
37	MF	SRB	Aleksandar Simić (to FK Voždovac)
12	MF	SRB	Dušan Kolarević (to Radnički Niš)
16	DF	SRB	Petar Planić (to BSK Borča)
33	DF	MNE	Stevan Marković (released)
—	MF	MNE	Miloje Raičević (to Radnički Nova Pazova)
—	MF	SRB	Goran Brkić (on loan to Jedinstvo Putevi, was on loan at FK Kolubara)
6	DF	SRB	Novica Milenović (to Spartak Subotica)
20	FW	MNE	Milan Purović (to (Ukraine) Metalurh Zaporizhya)
—	FW	MNE	Luka Merdović (to (Montenegro) OFK Grbalj, was on loan at Mladost Podgorica)
—	DF	SRB	Dušan Stanković (on loan to Timok, was on loan at FK Bačka Topola)
—	FW	SRB	Miloš Stanković (on loan to Timok, was on loan at FK Bačka Topola)
—	DF	SRB	Filip Pjević (to FK Teleoptik, was on loan at OFK Mladenovac)
5	DF	MNE	Ivan Kecojević (to (Turkey) Gaziantepspor)
27	GK	SRB	Đorđe Topalović (retired)
23	MF	SRB	Ilija Tutnjević (on loan to Sloga Temerin)
18	FW	SRB	Tamás Takács (on loan to FK Bačka Topola)
—	DF	MNE	Miloš Mrvaljević (released, after loan return from Sloga Temerin)
—	FW	SRB	Aleksandar Stojiljković (was on loan, now signed with Čukarički)
—	MF	BIH	Borisav Cicović (on loan to FK Bačka Topola)
—	FW	SRB	Uroš Nenadović (on loan to RFK Novi Sad)

=== Javor Ivanjica ===
In: Note: Flags indicate national team as defined under FIFA eligibility rules; some limited exceptions apply. Players may hold more than one non-FIFA nationality.

No.	Pos.	Nation	Player
12	GK	SRB	Đorđe Lazović (on loan from FK Vojvodina)
2	MF	SRB	Predrag Đorđević (from FK Jagodina, was on loan at Sinđelić Niš)
13	FW	SRB	Žarko Lazetić (from (Indonesia) Persis Solo)
20	DF	SRB	Milovan Milović (from Vojvodina)
9	FW	SRB	Bojan Spasojević (loan return from Sloga Petrovac)
19	MF	SRB	Jovan Đokić (loan return from Rudar Kostolac)
30	FW	SRB	Dragan Milovanović (from Banat Zrenjanin)
15	FW	SRB	Nemanja Kostić (from OFK Osečina)

Out: Note: Flags indicate national team as defined under FIFA eligibility rules; some limited exceptions apply. Players may hold more than one non-FIFA nationality.

No.	Pos.	Nation	Player
6	DF	SRB	Dejan Karan (loan return to FK Vojvodina)
9	DF	MNE	Nikola Vujadinović (loan return to (Italy) Udinese, next moved to (Austria) Sturm Graz)
18	FW	NGR	Obiora Odita (to (Kazakhstan) Taraz)
32	FW	SRB	Rade Veljović (loan return to (Romania) CFR Cluj, next moved to Smederevo)
8	MF	SRB	Goran Luković (to Metalac Gornji Milanovac)
4	MF	SRB	Filip Stanisavljević (to (Hungary) Újpest FC)
13	DF	SRB	Vladimir Jašić (to FK Voždovac)
15	MF	SRB	Miloje Šarčević (on loan to Rudar Kostolac)
—	MF	SRB	Dušan Sovilj (to Radnički S. Mitrovica, was on loan at FK Srem)

=== Rad ===
In: Note: Flags indicate national team as defined under FIFA eligibility rules; some limited exceptions apply. Players may hold more than one non-FIFA nationality.

No.	Pos.	Nation	Player
19	MF	BIH	Ognjen Gnjatić (from (Bosnia and Herzegovina) Kozara Gradiška)
12	GK	SRB	Filip Kljajić (from Metalac Gornji Milanovac)
31	GK	SRB	Budimir Janošević (from FK Vojvodina)
15	DF	MKD	Goran Bogdanović (from (North Macedonia) Rabotnički)
22	FW	SRB	Marko Ljubinković (from (China) Changchun Yatai)
3	DF	SRB	Nikola Antić (loan return from FK Palić)
4	DF	SRB	Lazar Ćirković (loan return from FK Palić)
6	MF	SRB	Saša Jovanović (loan return from FK Palić)
28	MF	SRB	Nenad Lukić (from (Bulgaria) Lokomotiv Plovdiv)
29	DF	SRB	Branislav Milošević (from BSK Borča)
26	GK	SRB	Aleksandar Jovanoviċ (loan return from FK Palić)

Out: Note: Flags indicate national team as defined under FIFA eligibility rules; some limited exceptions apply. Players may hold more than one non-FIFA nationality.

No.	Pos.	Nation	Player
28	MF	SRB	Marko Stanojević (to (Moldova) Sheriff Tiraspol)
22	FW	SRB	Nemanja Andrić (to (Hungary) Győri ETO)
15	DF	SRB	Tomislav Pajović (to (Moldova) Sheriff Tiraspol)
29	FW	SRB	Filip Malbašić (to (Germany) TSG 1899 Hoffenheim)
13	DF	FRA	Banfa Sylla (released)
6	DF	SRB	Marko Ranđelović (to Radnički Niš)
—	DF	SRB	Stevan Bates (on loan to (Iran) Mes Kerman, was on loan at (Azerbaijan) Khazar Lankaran)
19	MF	BIH	Duško Sakan (on loan to (Bosnia and Herzegovina) Rudar Prijedor)
3	DF	SRB	Danilo Kuzmanović (on loan to Jedinstvo Putevi)
—	DF	SRB	Marko Klisura (to OFK Mladenovac, was on loan at FK Palić)
—	MF	SRB	Nemanja Obradović (loan extension to Proleter Novi Sad)
22	DF	SRB	Dario Božičić (on loan to RFK Novi Sad)
2	DF	SRB	Aleksandar Pantić (to Red Star)
14	FW	SRB	Andrija Pavlović (on loan to BASK, was on loan at FK Palić)
24	FW	SRB	Saša Varga (on loan to BASK, was on loan at FK Palić)
—	DF	SRB	Vladimir Rodić (on loan to BASK, was on loan at FK Palić)

=== Hajduk Kula ===
In: Note: Flags indicate national team as defined under FIFA eligibility rules; some limited exceptions apply. Players may hold more than one non-FIFA nationality.

No.	Pos.	Nation	Player
10	FW	SRB	Danilo Sekulić (from Proleter Novi Sad)
—	DF	SRB	Stanoje Jovanović (from Jedinstvo Ub)
18	FW	SRB	Mladen Popović (from OFK Beograd)
8	MF	SRB	Milan Ćulum (from (Russia) Volgar Astrakhan)
4	DF	SRB	Radoš Bulatović (from Novi Pazar)
2	DF	BIH	Miroslav Milutinović (from Inđija)
7	MF	SRB	Nenad Adamović (from Smederevo)
14	DF	SRB	Nemanja Crnoglavac (from Teleoptik)
20	MF	BIH	Davor Cavrić (from Banat Zrenjanin)
6	MF	SRB	Ivan Obrovac (from Radnički 1923)
22	MF	SRB	Peđa Jerinić (from Smederevo)

Out: Note: Flags indicate national team as defined under FIFA eligibility rules; some limited exceptions apply. Players may hold more than one non-FIFA nationality.

No.	Pos.	Nation	Player
19	DF	SRB	Branko Pauljević (to Partizan)
8	FW	SRB	Sead Hadžibulić (to (Singapore) Tampines Rovers)
7	FW	SRB	Milan Bubalo (to (Slovenia) Koper)
33	MF	BIH	Miroslav Čovilo (to (Slovenia) Koper)
10	FW	SRB	Rodoljub Paunović (to (Thailand) TOT S.C.)
4	MF	SRB	Njegoš Goločevac (to (Bosnia and Herzegovina) FK Leotar)
5	DF	SRB	Ahmed Mujdragić (on loan to FK Novi Pazar)
6	DF	SRB	Nemanja Dabić (released)
21	DF	BIH	Aleksandar Vasiljević (to (Bosnia and Herzegovina) FK Leotar)
6	DF	SRB	Dragan Žarković (to Novi Pazar, previously brought from (Iran) Shahrdari Tabriz)
—	FW	SRB	Ognjen Šveljo (on loan to FK Crvenka, previously brought from Graničar Riđica)
—	MF	SRB	Ervin Hodonicki (on loan to FK Srbobran, previously brought from FK Srbobran)
3	DF	SRB	Darko Fejsa (to Radnički 1923)
22	MF	SRB	Novica Maksimović (to RFK Novi Sad)
—	MF	SRB	Vladimir Veteha (on loan to Hajduk Višnjićevo, previously brought from Radnički Šid)
—	FW	SRB	Oliver Mezei (on loan to FK Bačka Topola, was on loan at FK Srbobran)
—	FW	SRB	Srđan Vujaklija (released, was on loan at Banat Zrenjanin)

=== BSK Borča ===
In: Note: Flags indicate national team as defined under FIFA eligibility rules; some limited exceptions apply. Players may hold more than one non-FIFA nationality.

No.	Pos.	Nation	Player
20	MF	SRB	Ajazdin Nuhi (from Napredak Kruševac)
31	DF	SRB	Miroslav Gegić (free, last with Hajduk Kula)
17	FW	SRB	Nenad Đorđević (from Partizan Bumbarevo Brdo)
23	DF	SRB	Stefan Milojević (from (Slovakia) MFK Košice)
11	FW	SRB	Vuk Sotirović (from (Poland) Pogoń Szczecin)
69	DF	SRB	Petar Planić (from OFK Beograd)
30	GK	SRB	Goran Škarić (from FK Žarkovo)
33	DF	SRB	Ivica Milutinović (from (Cyprus) Ethnikos Achna)
—	DF	MKD	Perica Stančeski (from (Bosnia and Herzegovina) Željezničar Sarajevo)
—	FW	KOR	Park Tae-Gyu (free, last with (South Korea) Suwon City)

Out: Note: Flags indicate national team as defined under FIFA eligibility rules; some limited exceptions apply. Players may hold more than one non-FIFA nationality.

No.	Pos.	Nation	Player
8	MF	BIH	Jovica Stokić (to (Bosnia and Herzegovina) Borac Banja Luka)
7	MF	SRB	Milan Vignjević (to Napredak Kruševac)
10	MF	SRB	Marko Milunović (to FK Kolubara)
17	MF	MKD	Gjorgji Tanušev (to Proleter Novi Sad)
1	GK	AUS	Tomislav Arčaba (end of contract)
14	MF	SRB	Ivan Tasić (to (Greece) Niki Volos)
29	DF	BIH	Zoran Šupić (to (Greece) Iraklis)
16	MF	BIH	Ognjen Blagojević (on loan to PKB Padinska Skela)
13	DF	SRB	Branislav Milošević (to FK Rad)
34	DF	SRB	Vladimir Advigov (on loan to Vujić Voda)
19	DF	MNE	Aleksandar Radović (to Dinamo Pančevo)
3	DF	BIH	Miodrag Jovanović (to (Slovakia) Podbrezová)

=== FK Smederevo ===
In: Note: Flags indicate national team as defined under FIFA eligibility rules; some limited exceptions apply. Players may hold more than one non-FIFA nationality.

No.	Pos.	Nation	Player
7	MF	SRB	Igor Krmar (from Radnički 1923, was on loan at (Bosnia and Herzegovina) Slavija Sarajevo)
19	MF	SRB	Milan Vukašinović (from Radnički 1923)
—	GK	SRB	Hristijan Josifović (from Radnički 1923)
10	MF	SRB	Nenad Stojaković (free, last with Radnički 1923)
32	FW	SRB	Rade Veljović (from (Romania) CFR Cluj, was on loan at Javor)
44	DF	LBR	Omega Roberts (from Sloboda Užice)
4	DF	MNE	Dejan Ognjanović (loan return from (Albania) Kastrioti)
16	DF	BRA	João Paulo (from (Brazil) Cabofriense)
25	MF	SRB	Nikola Bogić (from (Montenegro) FK Mogren)
14	DF	MKD	Vlade Lazarevski (from (France) Amiens)
18	MF	SRB	Filip Osman (from (Bosnia and Herzegovina) Slavija Sarajevo)
8	MF	MNE	Luka Tiodorović (free, last with (Poland) Polonia Bytom)
15	MF	BRA	Lucas (from (Mexico) Cruz Azul)
77	FW	AUT	Dejan Obućina (from (Austria) Admira Wacker)
5	MF	SRB	Miloš Nikolić (from Radnički Svilajnac)
12	GK	SRB	Igor Kojić (from (Portugal) Santa Clara)
17	FW	SRB	Stefan Stojanović (from Mladi Radnik)
21	MF	SRB	Aleksandar Miljković (from Southern Myanmar)
23	DF	SRB	Danko Opančina (from Radnički 1923, was on loan at Pobeda Beloševac)
27	MF	SRB	Marko Jovanović (from Radnički Klupci)
33	DF	SRB	Mirko Radovanović (from (Slovakia) Trenčín)
11	FW	SRB	Nebojša Stanojlović (from Metalac GM)
6	MF	SRB	Srđan Urošević (from (Israel) Maccabi Nes Tziona)
99	FW	SRB	Miloš Đorđević (from Radnički 1923)
66	DF	MNE	Marko Stanovčić (from Bežanija)
9	FW	MNE	Nikola Radojičić (from (Montenegro) Sutjeska Nikšić)
90	DF	SRB	Vladimir Stanojević (from Čukarički)
84	MF	SRB	Vladimir Miljković (from Napredak)
—	MF	SRB	Miloš Radosavljević (from (Czech Republic) Viktoria Žižkov)
27	MF	SRB	Luka Savić (on loan from (Singapore) SAF)

Out: Note: Flags indicate national team as defined under FIFA eligibility rules; some limited exceptions apply. Players may hold more than one non-FIFA nationality.

No.	Pos.	Nation	Player
10	FW	SRB	Božidar Jelovac (to (United States) Vermont Voltage)
9	MF	SRB	Darko Brašanac (loan return to Partizan)
15	DF	SRB	Dušan Brković (to (Israel) Hapoel Haifa)
8	MF	SRB	Nenad Adamović (to Hajduk Kula)
44	MF	SRB	Stevan Kovačević (to (Portugal) FC Arouca)
18	FW	SRB	Slaviša Stojanović (to Jagodina)
26	FW	MNE	Jovan Vučinić (to Čukarički)
12	GK	SRB	Dejan Ranković (to Sloboda Užice)
6	MF	SRB	Saša Blagojević (to FK Teleoptik)
19	DF	MNE	Dejan Boljević (to (Slovakia) Tatran Prešov)
5	DF	SRB	Slavko Lukić (to Novi Pazar)
17	MF	SRB	Branislav Stanić (to Novi Pazar)
20	MF	BIH	Peđa Jerinić (to Hajduk Kula)
—	FW	BRA	Kamilo Silva (on loan to Jedinstvo Putevi, previously brought from (Hong Kong) Sham Shui Po)
28	DF	SLO	David Kiselak (to (Slovenia) Dravograd)
16	MF	MKD	Zoran Todorov (released)
—	MF	SRB	Nikola Lekić (to PKB Padinska Skela, was on loan at Slavija Beograd)
—	DF	SRB	Aleksandar Tasić (released)
14	MF	SRB	Marko Milosavljević (on loan to Seljak Mihajlovac)
2	DF	SRB	Ivan Milosavljević (to Rudar Kostolac)
29	FW	SRB	Vladimir Peralović (to Žarkovo)
27	MF	SRB	Marko Nikolić (on loan to Kolonija Kovin)

=== FK Novi Pazar ===
In: Note: Flags indicate national team as defined under FIFA eligibility rules; some limited exceptions apply. Players may hold more than one non-FIFA nationality.

No.	Pos.	Nation	Player
1	GK	BIH	Denis Mujkić (from (Bosnia and Herzegovina) Sloboda Tuzla)
10	MF	SRB	Risto Ristović (from Banat Zrenjanin)
5	DF	SRB	Ahmed Mujdragić (on loan from Hajduk Kula)
3	DF	SRB	Miloš Rnić (from Radnički Nova Pazova)
13	MF	BIH	Dario Damjanović (from (Bosnia and Herzegovina) Čelik Zenica)
28	FW	SRB	Saša Popin (from (North Macedonia) Horizont Turnovo)
—	DF	SRB	Nenad Todorović (from (Hungary) Pécsi MFC)
11	MF	SRB	Enver Alivodić (from (Cyprus) Enosis Neon Paralimni)
50	DF	SRB	Slavko Lukić (from Smederevo)
25	DF	SRB	Dragan Žarković (from Hajduk Kula)
15	MF	SRB	Branislav Stanić (from Smederevo)
33	DF	SRB	Ljuba Baranin (from (Azerbaijan) Kapaz PFC)
—	MF	BIH	Amar Rahmanović (from (Bosnia and Herzegovina) Sloboda Tuzla)

Out: Note: Flags indicate national team as defined under FIFA eligibility rules; some limited exceptions apply. Players may hold more than one non-FIFA nationality.

No.	Pos.	Nation	Player
1	GK	SRB	Vladimir Bajić (to Banat Zrenjanin)
6	DF	SRB	Bojan Ostojić (to FK Voždovac)
10	MF	BIH	Edin Ademović (to (Bosnia and Herzegovina) FK Sarajevo)
11	FW	MNE	Miloš Đalac (to (Montenegro) OFK Grbalj)
16	MF	SRB	Radan Šunjevarić (to (Bosnia and Herzegovina) FK Sarajevo)
20	MF	SRB	Ivan Pešić (to Mladost Lučani)
21	FW	BIH	Feđa Dudić (to (Bosnia and Herzegovina) Slavija Sarajevo)
55	FW	SRB	Vladimir Matić (to (Montenegro) OFK Grbalj)
26	DF	SRB	Đorđe Tutorić (to (Kazakhstan) FC Atyrau)
3	DF	SRB	Dragan Šarac (to FK Voždovac)
5	DF	SRB	Ivan Babić (to Metalac Gornji Milanovac)
44	DF	SRB	Radoš Bulatović (to Hajduk Kula)
13	DF	SRB	Elvedin Škrijelj (to Mladost Lučani)
88	DF	SRB	Miloš Marković (footballer born 1986) (to Mladost Lučani)
15	MF	MNE	Ramazan Bišević (released, previously brought from (Bulgaria) Slavia Sofia)
77	MF	SRB	Igor Jelić (to (Georgia (country)) FC Zestafoni, previously brought from OFK Beograd)
29	DF	SRB	Ivan Đoković (on loan to Borac Čačak, previously brought from (Slovakia) MFK Košice)
—	FW	SRB	Rijad Muratović (on loan to Morava Ćuprija)
—	FW	SRB	Elmin Marukic (on loan to Vujic Voda)
—	GK	SRB	Damir Beširović (on loan to Sinđelić Niš)

=== Radnički Niš ===
In: Note: Flags indicate national team as defined under FIFA eligibility rules; some limited exceptions apply. Players may hold more than one non-FIFA nationality.

No.	Pos.	Nation	Player
2	DF	SRB	Bojan Đorđević (was on loan, now signed from Red Star Belgrade)
TBA	FW	SRB	Marko Zdravković (from (Austria) FC Mäder)
TBA	FW	SRB	Milutin Ivanović (from FK Jagodina)
5	MF	SRB	Stevan Stefanović (from Sinđelić Niš)
4	MF	SRB	Nikola Lukić (from Metalac Gornji Milanovac)
3	DF	SRB	Branislav Vukomanović (from (Albania) Kastrioti)
11	DF	SRB	Marko Ranđelović (from FK Rad)
19	MF	SRB	Dušan Kolarević (from OFK Beograd)
8	MF	SRB	Vladan Binić (from Red Star, was on loan at Spartak Subotica)
9	FW	MKD	Aleksandar Bajevski (from (Indonesia) Pelita Jaya)
7	FW	CRO	Milan Pavličić (from (Croatia) NK Osijek)
TBA	DF	MNE	Nemanja Ostojić (from (Montenegro) Sutjeska Nikšić)
25	MF	SRB	Saša Stojanović (from (Cyprus) Ethnikos Achna)
6	DF	SRB	Miloš Živković (from (North Macedonia) Rabotnički)
15	FW	SRB	Milan Jovanović (from (Myanmar) Yangon United)
22	FW	SRB	Dalibor Mitrović (from (Canada) London City)

Out: Note: Flags indicate national team as defined under FIFA eligibility rules; some limited exceptions apply. Players may hold more than one non-FIFA nationality.

No.	Pos.	Nation	Player
19	MF	SRB	Marko Mančić (to Radnički Pirot)
12	MF	SRB	Bojan Stamenković (to Timok)
4	DF	SRB	Aleksandar Cvetković (to Sinđelić Niš)
5	DF	SRB	Aleksandar Petrović (to (Uzbekistan) Nasaf Qarshi)
13	MF	SRB	Nikola Stefanović (to Sloga Kraljevo)
—	DF	SRB	Dušan Mladenović (released, was on loan at Sinđelić Niš)
—	DF	KOR	Kim Seon-Il (released)
21	FW	SRB	Minja Popović (released)
8	FW	SRB	Čedomir Paunović (to Sinđelić Niš)
11	FW	SRB	Ivan Pejčić (to Radnički 1923)
6	DF	SRB	Bojan Dojkić (to (Greece) Pierikos)
—	DF	SRB	Rade Dugalić (on loan to FK Car Konstantin, after loan return from FK Radnik Surdulica)
—	FW	SRB	Jovan Dimitrijević (loan extension to FK Žitorađa)
—	DF	SRB	Stefan Marković (loan extension to Car Konstantin)
9	FW	SRB	Jovan Jovanović (to Sloga Kraljevo)
7	MF	SRB	Petar Mitić (on loan to FK Žitorađa)

=== Donji Srem ===
In: Note: Flags indicate national team as defined under FIFA eligibility rules; some limited exceptions apply. Players may hold more than one non-FIFA nationality.

No.	Pos.	Nation	Player
17	MF	SRB	Marko Putinčanin (from Bežanija)
88	MF	SRB	Milan Milutinović (from Mačva Šabac)
44	FW	SRB	Igor Urošević (from Šumadija Jagnjilo)
5	DF	SRB	Boris Milekić (from FK Inđija)
21	FW	SRB	Ognjen Damnjanović (from (Israel) Ironi Nir Ramat HaSharon)
1	GK	SRB	Anđelko Đuričić (from (Egypt) Ittihad Al-Sakandary)
—	MF	SRB	Uroš Milosavljević (from (Uzbekistan) Bunyodkor)
22	FW	SRB	Marjan Ćirić (from Radnički Šid)

Out: Note: Flags indicate national team as defined under FIFA eligibility rules; some limited exceptions apply. Players may hold more than one non-FIFA nationality.

No.	Pos.	Nation	Player
14	FW	SRB	Nikola Ašćerić (to (Albania) Kastrioti)
17	FW	SRB	Goran Matić (loan return to Čukarički)
—	DF	SRB	Marko Prljević (released)
—	DF	SRB	Vuk Babić (on loan to Radnički Šid)
—	MF	SRB	Ivan Šubert (on loan to Radnički Šid)
—	FW	BIH	Nemanja Mrkajić (on loan to Radnički Šid, was on loan at Mladost Kupinovo)

== See also ==
- Serbian SuperLiga
- 2012–13 Serbian SuperLiga

== External sources ==
- Sportske.net information agency.
- SuperLiga news at Sportski žurnal website.
- Sportal.rs information agency.
- Srpskifudbal.rs football website. Transfers page
- Superliga.rs
