= List of Serbian football transfers winter 2011–12 =

This is a list of transfers in Serbian football for the 2011-12 winter transfer window. Only moves featuring a Serbian SuperLiga side are listed. The order by which the clubs are listed is equal to the classification of the SuperLiga at the winter break.

== Serbian SuperLiga ==
=== Partizan ===
In: Note: Flags indicate national team as defined under FIFA eligibility rules; some limited exceptions apply. Players may hold more than one non-FIFA nationality.

No.	Pos.	Nation	Player
40	DF	SRB	Miloš Ostojić (loan return from FK Teleoptik)

Out: Note: Flags indicate national team as defined under FIFA eligibility rules; some limited exceptions apply. Players may hold more than one non-FIFA nationality.

No.	Pos.	Nation	Player
19	FW	BIH	Vladimir Jovančić (to (South Korea) Seongnam Ilhwa Chunma)
5	DF	SRB	Aleksandar Ranković (released)
—	MF	SRB	Luka Stojanović (to (Portugal) Sporting CP)
—	DF	SRB	Radenko Kamberović (to (Montenegro) Budućnost Podgorica, was on loan at FK Teleoptik)

=== Red Star Belgrade ===
In: Note: Flags indicate national team as defined under FIFA eligibility rules; some limited exceptions apply. Players may hold more than one non-FIFA nationality.

No.	Pos.	Nation	Player
6	DF	SRB	Jovan Krneta (loan return from FK Sopot)
23	MF	SRB	Petar Đuričković (from FK Sopot)
18	FW	SRB	Ognjen Ožegović (from Red Star Belgrade U19)
21	MF	SRB	Marko Perović (free, last with (United States) New England Revolution)
25	DF	SRB	Filip Mladenović (from Borac Čačak)
15	MF	SRB	Luka Milivojević (from Rad)
3	DF	SRB	Duško Tošić (loan return from (Spain) Real Betis)
17	FW	MNE	Filip Kasalica (from Sloboda Užice)
13	DF	SRB	Nikola Maksimović (from Sloboda Užice)
27	MF	SRB	Marko Mirić (from Spartak Subotica)
77	FW	GHA	Nathaniel Asamoah (from (Ghana) Asante Kotoko)
16	FW	SRB	Luka Milunović (from (Belgium) Zulte Waregem)

Out: Note: Flags indicate national team as defined under FIFA eligibility rules; some limited exceptions apply. Players may hold more than one non-FIFA nationality.

No.	Pos.	Nation	Player
9	FW	BRA	Bruno Mezenga (loan return to (Brazil) Flamengo, next moved to (Turkey) Orduspor)
13	DF	GHA	Lee Addy (to (China) Dalian Aerbin)
33	MF	SRB	Nenad Kovačević (to (Azerbaijan) FC Baku)
18	MF	SRB	Milan Jeremić (to Borac Čačak)
2	MF	BRA	Sávio (to (Brazil) Avenida)
27	MF	SRB	Goran Čaušić (to Rad)
6	DF	SRB	Nikola Ignjatijević (to (Ukraine) Zorya Luhansk)
—	MF	MNE	Marko Mugoša (to Borac Čačak, was on loan at FK Novi Pazar)
16	DF	MNE	Stevan Reljić (on loan to Borac Čačak)
—	DF	SRB	Bojan Đorđević (on loan to Radnički Niš, was on loan at Napredak Kruševac)
—	MF	SRB	Aleksandar Kovačević (to Spartak Subotica, was on loan at FK Sopot)
—	MF	SRB	Vladan Binić (on loan to Spartak Subotica, was on loan at Radnički 1923)
—	FW	SRB	Miloš Trifunović (to (China) Liaoning Whowin, was on loan at (Uzbekistan) Bunyodkor)
99	FW	SRB	Andrija Kaluđerović (to (China) Beijing Guoan)

=== FK Vojvodina ===
In: Note: Flags indicate national team as defined under FIFA eligibility rules; some limited exceptions apply. Players may hold more than one non-FIFA nationality.

No.	Pos.	Nation	Player
69	MF	SRB	Aleksandar Katai (on loan from (Greece) Olympiacos)
19	DF	SRB	Milovan Milović (loan return from Javor Ivanjica)
10	MF	GNB	Almami Moreira (from (China) Dalian Aerbin)
18	MF	SRB	Marko Poletanović (loan return from Cement Beočin)
4	MF	GHA	Stephen Appiah (free, last with (Italy) AC Cesena)

Out: Note: Flags indicate national team as defined under FIFA eligibility rules; some limited exceptions apply. Players may hold more than one non-FIFA nationality.

No.	Pos.	Nation	Player
23	DF	GHA	Abraham Frimpong (to Napredak Kruševac)
4	MF	SRB	Slobodan Medojević (to (Germany) VfL Wolfsburg)
17	MF	GEO	Giorgi Merebashvili (to (Georgia (country)) Dinamo Tbilisi)
21	FW	BIH	Nemanja Bilbija (on loan to (Bosnia and Herzegovina) Borac Banja Luka)
—	DF	MNE	Stefan Zogović (was on loan, now signed for (Montenegro) Sutjeska Nikšić)
24	DF	SRB	Dejan Karan (on loan to Javor Ivanjica)
—	FW	SRB	Đorđe Šušnjar (on loan to (Montenegro) Sutjeska Nikšić, was on loan at Donji Srem Pećinci)
—	FW	SRB	Vladimir Silađi (on loan to Sloga Temerin, was on loan at Proleter Novi Sad)
—	DF	SRB	Nemanja Radoja (on loan to Cement Beočin, was on loan at ČSK Čelarevo)
—	DF	SRB	Luka Slijepčević (on loan to FK Veternik)
30	GK	SRB	Đorđe Lazović (on loan to Dunav Stari Banovci)
9	FW	SRB	Brana Ilić (to (Kazakhstan) FC Aktobe)
18	FW	GHA	Yaw Antwi (on loan to Metalac GM, returned in March)

=== Radnički 1923 ===
In: Note: Flags indicate national team as defined under FIFA eligibility rules; some limited exceptions apply. Players may hold more than one non-FIFA nationality.

No.	Pos.	Nation	Player
7	MF	SRB	Nikola Simić (from (Israel) Hapoel Acre)
15	MF	SRB	Miljan Mutavdžić (from (Sweden) Malmö FF)
26	FW	SRB	Lazar Popović (from Bane Raška)
25	MF	SRB	Aleksandar Komljenović (from Bane Raška)
19	MF	SRB	Milan Vukašinović (from FK Srem)
9	FW	SRB	Miloš Đorđević (free, last with (Netherlands) Jong PSV)
23	DF	BIH	Aleksandar Kosorić (from FK Rad)
17	MF	SRB	Aleksandar Varjačić (loan return from Pobeda Beloševac)

Out: Note: Flags indicate national team as defined under FIFA eligibility rules; some limited exceptions apply. Players may hold more than one non-FIFA nationality.

No.	Pos.	Nation	Player
7	MF	SRB	Vladan Binić (loan return to Red Star Belgrade)
9	MF	SRB	Nenad Stojaković (released)
15	DF	SRB	Radosav Aleksić (to (Bosnia and Herzegovina) Slavija Sarajevo)
17	MF	SRB	Žarko Karamatić (to (Bosnia and Herzegovina) Slavija Sarajevo)
31	MF	SRB	Igor Krmar (on loan to (Bosnia and Herzegovina) Slavija Sarajevo)
—	FW	SRB	Lazar Vidić (to (Bosnia and Herzegovina) Slavija Sarajevo, was on loan at Mladi Radnik)

=== Sloboda Užice ===
In: Note: Flags indicate national team as defined under FIFA eligibility rules; some limited exceptions apply. Players may hold more than one non-FIFA nationality.

No.	Pos.	Nation	Player
9	FW	SRB	Predrag Ranđelović (from (Montenegro) FK Mogren)
10	MF	SRB	Bojan Beljić (from (Iran) Shahrdari Tabriz)
4	DF	SRB	Mladen Lazarević (from (Iran) Gostaresh Foolad)
18	MF	SRB	Vladimir Krstić (from BSK Borča)
31	MF	CMR	Didier Tayou (from (Tunisia) Olympique du Kef, was on loan with (Saudi Arabia) Najran SC)
30	DF	SRB	Aleksandar Rizovski (from Red Star Belgrade youth squad)

Out: Note: Flags indicate national team as defined under FIFA eligibility rules; some limited exceptions apply. Players may hold more than one non-FIFA nationality.

No.	Pos.	Nation	Player
4	DF	SRB	Nikola Maksimović (to Red Star Belgrade)
9	FW	MNE	Filip Kasalica (to Red Star Belgrade)
10	MF	SRB	Njegoš Goločevac (to Hajduk Kula)
14	DF	SRB	Đuro Stevančević (to FK Inđija)
17	DF	SRB	Bogdan Planić (to FK Bežanija)
18	MF	MNE	Vuk Đurić (to FK Voždovac)
5	DF	BIH	Jovan Vujanić (on loan to (Bosnia and Herzegovina) Slavija Sarajevo)
6	MF	MKD	Gjorgji Tanušev (to BSK Borča)
21	MF	SRB	Nebojša Prtenjak (to (Kazakhstan) FC Taraz)

=== Spartak Subotica ===
In: Note: Flags indicate national team as defined under FIFA eligibility rules; some limited exceptions apply. Players may hold more than one non-FIFA nationality.

No.	Pos.	Nation	Player
—	GK	SRB	Goran Labus (loan return from (Bosnia and Herzegovina) Zvijezda Gradačac)
4	MF	SRB	Aleksandar Kovačević (from Red Star Belgrade)
13	MF	SRB	Vladan Binić (on loan from Red Star Belgrade)
27	DF	SRB	Stefan Đorđević (from Proleter Novi Sad)
5	DF	SRB	Đorđe Đurić (from Rad)
21	DF	SRB	Bojan Bjedov (from Mladost Apatin)

Out: Note: Flags indicate national team as defined under FIFA eligibility rules; some limited exceptions apply. Players may hold more than one non-FIFA nationality.

No.	Pos.	Nation	Player
24	DF	SRB	Nebojša Mezei (on loan to Radnički Sombor)
14	MF	SRB	Marko Stančetić (on loan to Radnički Sombor)
32	GK	SRB	Nikola Kovačević (on loan to (Bosnia and Herzegovina) Zvijezda Gradačac)
—	MF	SRB	Miloš Bokić (on loan to (Bosnia and Herzegovina) FK Leotar, was on loan at Mladost Lučani)
21	MF	SRB	Marko Mirić (to Red Star Belgrade)
4	MF	SRB	Slobodan Simović (to (Belarus) Dinamo Minsk)
13	MF	USA	Danny Barrera (to (United States) Cal FC)
—	MF	BIH	Miroslav Čovilo (was on loan, now signed with Hajduk Kula)
5	DF	SRB	Nikola Milanković (to (Kazakhstan) FC Atyrau)
—	DF	SRB	Daniel Farkaš (on loan to FK Senta, after being brought from them)

=== OFK Beograd ===
In: Note: Flags indicate national team as defined under FIFA eligibility rules; some limited exceptions apply. Players may hold more than one non-FIFA nationality.

No.	Pos.	Nation	Player
—	FW	USA	Matthew Dunn (from (Germany) 1. FC Köln youth)
12	MF	SRB	Dušan Kolarević (from Sinđelić Niš)
15	DF	SRB	Nikola Vasiljević (from Kolubara)
7	MF	SRB	Jovan Stojanović (from (Belgium) Cercle Brugge)
—	MF	MNE	Milivoje Raičević (from (Montenegro) FK Berane)
—	DF	SRB	Stefan Simić (from Zvižd Kučevo)

Out: Note: Flags indicate national team as defined under FIFA eligibility rules; some limited exceptions apply. Players may hold more than one non-FIFA nationality.

No.	Pos.	Nation	Player
12	MF	SRB	Miloš Filipović (on loan to Kolubara)
7	MF	SRB	Goran Brkić (on loan to Kolubara)
—	MF	SRB	Nemanja Mladenović (on loan to Kolubara)
29	DF	SRB	Filip Pjević (on loan to OFK Mladenovac)
—	GK	MNE	Andrija Dragojević (on loan to OFK Mladenovac)
19	MF	SRB	Miloš Krstić (to FK Jagodina)
—	DF	MNE	Miloš Bakrač (to (Switzerland) FC Sion)
17	DF	MNE	Miloš Mrvaljević (on loan to Sloga Temerin)
—	DF	MNE	Ilija Bogdanović (on loan to (Montenegro) OFK Grbalj)
21	MF	SRB	Miloš Bajić (to Napredak Kruševac)
77	FW	SRB	Igor Stanojević (on loan to PKB Padinska Skela)

=== FK Jagodina ===
In: Note: Flags indicate national team as defined under FIFA eligibility rules; some limited exceptions apply. Players may hold more than one non-FIFA nationality.

No.	Pos.	Nation	Player
14	MF	SRB	Miloš Krstić (from OFK Beograd)
7	MF	BIH	Esmir Ahmetović (from (Bosnia and Herzegovina) NK Tuzla)
77	MF	SLE	Lamin Suma (from (Sierra Leone) FC Kallon)

Out: Note: Flags indicate national team as defined under FIFA eligibility rules; some limited exceptions apply. Players may hold more than one non-FIFA nationality.

No.	Pos.	Nation	Player
—	FW	SRB	Stevan Račić (to Napredak Kruševac)
33	DF	SRB	Aleksandar Vasiljević (to Hajduk Kula)
23	DF	SRB	Nenad Nastić (to (Bosnia and Herzegovina) Leotar Trebinje)
3	DF	SRB	Radoš Protić (to (Ukraine) PFC Oleksandria)
77	MF	SRB	Filip Arsenijević (to (Kazakhstan) Shakhter Karagandy)
7	FW	SRB	Vladimir Vujović (to Metalac G.M.)
27	FW	SRB	Milo Mićunović (on loan to Sloga Kraljevo)
—	MF	SRB	Predrag Đorđević (on loan to Sinđelić Niš)
—	MF	SRB	Miloš Jovanović (on loan to Sinđelić Niš)

=== Hajduk Kula ===
In: Note: Flags indicate national team as defined under FIFA eligibility rules; some limited exceptions apply. Players may hold more than one non-FIFA nationality.

No.	Pos.	Nation	Player
4	MF	SRB	Njegoš Goločevac (from Sloboda Užice)
32	FW	SRB	Danilo Pejović (from Njegoš Lovćenac)
6	DF	SRB	Nemanja Dabić (from Radnički Sombor)
21	DF	SRB	Aleksandar Vasiljević (from FK Jagodina)
14	DF	SRB	Branislav Vejnović (from Radnički Sombor)
9	MF	SRB	Lazar Veselinović (from Mladi Radnik)
2	DF	SRB	Miloš Cvetković (from FK Rad)
28	MF	SRB	Milan Zorica (from Red Star Belgrade U19)
26	MF	BIH	Miroslav Čovilo (was on loan, now signed from Spartak Subotica)

Out: Note: Flags indicate national team as defined under FIFA eligibility rules; some limited exceptions apply. Players may hold more than one non-FIFA nationality.

No.	Pos.	Nation	Player
9	FW	SRB	Srđan Vujaklija (on loan to FK Banat)
32	MF	SRB	Aleksandar Avrić (to Radnički Sombor)
28	MF	SRB	Kenan Ragipović (released)
20	MF	GHA	Quincy Osei (to (Maldives) Club Valencia)
21	FW	SRB	Nenad Panić (released)
2	DF	SRB	Miroslav Gegić (released)
—	GK	SRB	Dejan Kronić (to FK Bačka Topola)
14	MF	SRB	Dejan Kekezović (to FK Bačka Topola)
4	MF	MNE	Jovan Nikolić (to (Montenegro) Sutjeska Nikšić)
6	DF	AUS	Aleksandar Jovanović (to (Thailand) BEC Tero Sasana)

=== FK Smederevo ===
In: Note: Flags indicate national team as defined under FIFA eligibility rules; some limited exceptions apply. Players may hold more than one non-FIFA nationality.

No.	Pos.	Nation	Player
—	DF	SRB	Aleksandar Tasić (from Mladi Radnik)
28	DF	SVN	David Kiselak (from (Slovenia) NK Dravograd)
3	DF	SRB	Borislav Simić (from (Czech Republic) SK Dynamo České Budějovice)
23	FW	SRB	Uroš Momić (from ČSK Čelarevo)
10	FW	SRB	Božidar Jelovac (from (Czech Republic) SK Dynamo České Budějovice)
5	DF	SRB	Slavko Lukić (loan return from (Sweden) Limhamn Bunkeflo)
9	MF	SRB	Darko Brašanac (loan extension from Partizan)

Out: Note: Flags indicate national team as defined under FIFA eligibility rules; some limited exceptions apply. Players may hold more than one non-FIFA nationality.

No.	Pos.	Nation	Player
10	FW	SRB	Nikola Trujić (loan return to Teleoptik, next loaned to (Israel) Hapoel Acre)
11	FW	SRB	Vojislav Bojatović (on loan to Mladi Radnik)
7	FW	SRB	Dragan Ćeran (to (Israel) Hapoel Haifa)
—	FW	SRB	Igor Grkajac (to (Faroe Islands) TB Tvøroyri, was on loan at FK Kolubara)
—	DF	SRB	Miloš Karišik (was on loan, now signed with (Czech Republic) Slovan Liberec)
—	MF	SRB	Nenad Mladenović (on loan to Balkan Bukovica, last was on loan at FK Inđija)
—	FW	SRB	Nikola Lekić (on loan to Slavija Beograd, previously on loan at Mladi Radnik)

=== Javor Ivanjica ===
In: Note: Flags indicate national team as defined under FIFA eligibility rules; some limited exceptions apply. Players may hold more than one non-FIFA nationality.

No.	Pos.	Nation	Player
21	DF	MNE	Milko Novaković (from (Montenegro) OFK Grbalj)
20	MF	SRB	Vladimir Radivojević (from Mladost Lučani)
6	DF	SRB	Dejan Karan (on loan from Vojvodina)
13	DF	SRB	Vladimir Jašić (free, last with (Albania) Vllaznia)
14	MF	SRB	Stefan Stojanov (from Železničar Beograd)
9	DF	MNE	Nikola Vujadinović (on loan from (Italy) Udinese)

Out: Note: Flags indicate national team as defined under FIFA eligibility rules; some limited exceptions apply. Players may hold more than one non-FIFA nationality.

No.	Pos.	Nation	Player
7	DF	SRB	Zoran Rendulić (to (South Korea) Pohang Steelers)
20	DF	SRB	Milovan Milović (loan return to FK Vojvodina)
21	DF	SRB	Marko Milovanović (to (Kazakhstan) FC Okzhetpes)
15	MF	SRB	Fuad Salihović (to Rudar Kostolac)
13	MF	SRB	Dušan Sovilj (to Srem Sremska Mitrovica)
12	GK	SRB	Srđan Soldatović (retired)
14	MF	SRB	Branislav Čonka (on loan to Rudar Kostolac)
6	DF	SRB	Dragan Stević (on loan to GFK Jasenica 1911)
19	MF	SRB	Jovan Đokić (on loan to Rudar Kostolac)

=== Rad ===
In: Note: Flags indicate national team as defined under FIFA eligibility rules; some limited exceptions apply. Players may hold more than one non-FIFA nationality.

No.	Pos.	Nation	Player
18	MF	SRB	Goran Čaušić (from Red Star Belgrade)
3	DF	SRB	Danilo Kuzmanović (from (Sweden) Djurgårdens IF)
19	MF	BIH	Duško Sakan (from (Bosnia and Herzegovina) Borac Banja Luka)

Out: Note: Flags indicate national team as defined under FIFA eligibility rules; some limited exceptions apply. Players may hold more than one non-FIFA nationality.

No.	Pos.	Nation	Player
19	MF	SRB	Luka Milivojević (to Red Star Belgrade)
14	DF	SRB	Predrag Ocokoljić (retired)
—	FW	SRB	Nemanja Obradović (on loan to Proleter Novi Sad, was on loan to FK Srem S.M.)
—	DF	SRB	Miloš Cvetković (to Hajduk Kula, was on loan at FK Palić)
3	DF	SRB	Radomir Koković (to Napredak Kruševac)
—	DF	BIH	Aleksandar Kosorić (to Radnički 1923)
—	DF	SRB	Đorđe Đurić (to Spartak Subotica)
—	DF	SRB	Stevan Bates (on loan to (Azerbaijan) Khazar Lankaran, previously brought from (Azerbaijan) FK Baku)
18	MF	GHA	Ferdinand Opoku (released)
24	DF	SRB	Lazar Ćirković (on loan to FK Palić)

=== BSK Borča ===
In: Note: Flags indicate national team as defined under FIFA eligibility rules; some limited exceptions apply. Players may hold more than one non-FIFA nationality.

No.	Pos.	Nation	Player
31	FW	SRB	Srđan Mulćan (from FK Teleoptik)
14	MF	SRB	Ivan Tasić (from (Greece) Levadiakos)
8	MF	BIH	Jovica Stokić (from (Hungary) Kecskeméti)
15	DF	SRB	Miloš Stamenković (from OFK Mladenovac)
10	FW	SRB	Marko Milunović (from Hajduk Beograd)
29	DF	BIH	Zoran Šupić (from FK Novi Pazar)
17	MF	MKD	Gjorgji Tanušev (from Sloboda Užice)
5	MF	SRB	Jordan Jovanović (loan return from FK Lepušnica)

Out: Note: Flags indicate national team as defined under FIFA eligibility rules; some limited exceptions apply. Players may hold more than one non-FIFA nationality.

No.	Pos.	Nation	Player
14	MF	MNE	Asmir Kajević (to (Switzerland) FC Zürich)
29	MF	SRB	Vladimir Krstić (to Sloboda Užice)
10	MF	SRB	Jovan Vasić (on loan to FK Lepušnica)
31	DF	SRB	Miloš Stojičić (to OFK Mladenovac)
15	DF	SRB	Bojan Ušumović (to Radnički Sombor)
8	MF	BIH	Dejan Vukomanović (to (Armenia) Gandzasar)
34	MF	SRB	Vladimir Buač (to (Kazakhstan) FC Atyrau)
17	FW	MNE	Igor Lambulić (to Čukarički Stankom)
20	FW	SRB	Ivan Damnjanović (on loan to PKB Padinska Skela)
5	MF	SRB	Vojkan Miljković (released)
16	DF	SRB	Nenad Milošević (on loan to Balkan Bukovica)

=== FK Novi Pazar ===
In: Note: Flags indicate national team as defined under FIFA eligibility rules; some limited exceptions apply. Players may hold more than one non-FIFA nationality.

No.	Pos.	Nation	Player
21	FW	BIH	Feđa Dudić (from (Bosnia and Herzegovina) GOŠK Gabela)
30	FW	BIH	Admir Raščić (from (Bosnia and Herzegovina) Olimpik Sarajevo)
55	FW	SRB	Vladimir Matić (from (Armenia) Gandzasar)
26	DF	SRB	Đorđe Tutorić (from (Hungary) Ferencváros)
1	GK	SRB	Vladimir Bajić (from FK Srem)
44	DF	SRB	Radoš Bulatović (from (Hungary) Zalaegerszegi TE)
25	GK	SRB	Damir Beširović (loan return from (Albania) Gramozi Ersekë)

Out: Note: Flags indicate national team as defined under FIFA eligibility rules; some limited exceptions apply. Players may hold more than one non-FIFA nationality.

No.	Pos.	Nation	Player
15	DF	BIH	Bojan Petrić (to (Malaysia) PBDKT T-Team FC)
12	GK	BIH	Sead Ramović (to (Norway) Lillestrøm SK)
33	MF	MNE	Marko Mugoša (loan return to Red Star Belgrade)
77	MF	SRB	Vladan Spasojević (to Mladost Lučani)
15	DF	SRB	Aleksandar Petrović (to Radnički Niš)
26	DF	BIH	Zoran Šupić (to BSK Borča)
21	DF	SRB	Edin Ferizović (on loan to Sinđelić Niš)
18	GK	SRB	Borivoje Ristić (to Čukarički Stankom)
17	FW	SRB	Dino Caković (on loan to Mladi Radnik)
—	DF	SRB	Ivan Vujičić (to (Bosnia and Herzegovina) Olimpik Sarajevo, was on loan at Posavac Boljevci)
2	DF	SRB	Nikola Đurić (to BASK)

=== Borac Čačak ===
In: Note: Flags indicate national team as defined under FIFA eligibility rules; some limited exceptions apply. Players may hold more than one non-FIFA nationality.

No.	Pos.	Nation	Player
33	GK	BIH	Đorđe Babalj (from (Iran) Shahrdari Tabriz)
25	MF	SRB	Branislav Atanacković (from (Moldova) Dacia Chişinău)
28	MF	SRB	Stefan Živković (from Hajduk Beograd)
88	DF	MNE	Stevan Reljić (on loan from Red Star Belgrade)
44	DF	SRB	Siniša Radanović (from (Hungary) Kecskeméti TE)
70	MF	SRB	Milan Jeremić (from Red Star Belgrade)
10	FW	SRB	Marko Pavićević (from (Cyprus) Ethnikos Achna)
13	MF	SRB	Srđan Stanić (from (Hungary) Ferencváros)
14	MF	MNE	Marko Mugoša (from Red Star Belgrade, was on loan at FK Novi Pazar)

Out: Note: Flags indicate national team as defined under FIFA eligibility rules; some limited exceptions apply. Players may hold more than one non-FIFA nationality.

No.	Pos.	Nation	Player
25	DF	SRB	Filip Mladenović (to Red Star Belgrade)
—	MF	BIH	Mario Božić (to (China) Shanghai Shenhua, after being brought from (Israel) FC Ashdod)
2	DF	SRB	Dušan Dunjić (released)
4	DF	SRB	Aleksandar Ignjatović (to (Indonesia) PS Mojokerto Putra)
10	MF	SRB	Dušan Martinović (released)
12	GK	MNE	Blažo Bakrač (to (Montenegro) FK Kom)
14	DF	SRB	Bojan Čukić (on loan to FK Vršac)
15	MF	SRB	Dušan Stojkov (on loan to Radnik Surdulica)
88	MF	SRB	Marko Krasić (to (Indonesia) Arema FC)
—	GK	SRB	Filip Pjevac (to FK Vršac, was on loan at Polet Ljubić)
26	MF	SRB	Miloš Tomašević (on loan to Čukarički Stankom)
8	FW	SRB	Jovan Damjanović (to (Belarus) Dinamo Minsk)
—	MF	SRB	Dušan Kuveljić (on loan to Polet Ljubić, was on loan at Sloboda Čačak)
—	MF	SRB	Nikola Boranijašević (on loan to Rudar Kostolac, was on loan at Polet Ljubić)

=== Metalac G. Milanovac ===
In: Note: Flags indicate national team as defined under FIFA eligibility rules; some limited exceptions apply. Players may hold more than one non-FIFA nationality.

No.	Pos.	Nation	Player
18	DF	SRB	Danko Filipović (from Budućnost Valjevo)
3	MF	SRB	Nenad Živanović (from FK Inđija)
10	MF	SRB	Vladimir Vujović (from FK Jagodina)
7	FW	GHA	Yaw Antwi (on loan from FK Vojvodina, went back in March)

Out: Note: Flags indicate national team as defined under FIFA eligibility rules; some limited exceptions apply. Players may hold more than one non-FIFA nationality.

No.	Pos.	Nation	Player
3	DF	MKD	Nikola Karčev (to (Myanmar) Yangon United)
—	DF	SRB	Miloš Živković (to (North Macedonia) FK Rabotnički, after loan return from FK Srem)
—	DF	MNE	Gojko Žižić (to (Montenegro) Sutjeska Nikšić)
24	MF	MKD	Gjorgji Mojsov (to (North Macedonia) Horizont Turnovo)
3	DF	SRB	Branislav Vukomanović (to (Albania) Kastrioti Krujë)
10	MF	SRB	Ivan Petrović (to (Romania) CSMS Iaşi)
33	GK	SRB	Saša Mišić (on loan to OFK Mladenovac)
18	MF	SRB	Đorđe Ružičić (on loan to Polet Ljubić)
7	FW	SRB	Nebojša Stanojlović (released)

== See also ==
- Serbian SuperLiga
- 2011–12 Serbian SuperLiga
- List of Serbian football transfers summer 2011

== External sources ==
- Sportske.net information agency.
- SuperLiga news at Sportski žurnal website.
- Sportal.rs information agency.
- Srpskifudbal.rs football website.
