= Stefan Stojanović =

Stefan Stojanović may refer to:

- Stefan Stojanovic (soccer, born 2001), American soccer player
- Stefan Stojanović (footballer, born 1988), Serbian footballer
- Stefan Stojanović (footballer, born 1992), Serbian footballer
- Stefan Stojanović (footballer, born 1997), Serbian footballer
