= Jerinić =

Jerinić is a Serbo-Croatian surname. Notable people with the surname include:

- Branislav Jerinić (1932–2006), Serbian actor
- Peđa Jerinić (born 1988), Serbian footballer
