= Fejsa =

Fejsa is a surname. Notable people with the surname include:

- Darko Fejsa (born 1987), Serbian footballer, brother of Ljubomir
- Ljubomir Fejsa (born 1988), Serbian footballer
