= Jovan Vasić =

Serbian footballer

Personal information
- Full name: Jovan Vasić
- Date of birth: January 20, 1987 (age 39)
- Place of birth: Beograd, SFR Yugoslavia
- Height: 1.87 m (6 ft 1 1/2 in)
- Position: Defensive midfielder

Senior career*
Years	Team	Apps	(Gls)
2004–	BSK Borča	2	(0)
2005–2006	→ FK Lepušnica (loan)		
2007	→ PKB Padinska Skela (loan)	8	(2)
2009–2010	→ PKB Padinska Skela(loan)		
2010–2011	→ FK Lepušnica (loan)	29	(20)
2011–2019	BSK Borča	4	(0)
- * Club domestic league appearances and goals

Jovan Vasić (Serbian Cyrillic: Јован Bacић; born 20 January 1987) is a Serbian retired footballer, who primarily played for BSK Borča, partly in the Serbian SuperLiga. He made SuperLiga debut on 13 August 2011, the first matchday of the 2011–12 season, against FK Smederevo.
