= Nebojša Mezei =

Serbian footballer

Personal information
- Full name: Nebojša Mezei
- Date of birth: 15 February 1991 (age 35)
- Place of birth: Subotica, SFR Yugoslavia
- Height: 1.78 m (5 ft 10 in)
- Positions: Left-back; left midfielder

Team information
- Current team: Bačka 1901

Youth career
- Partizan

Senior career*
| Years | Team | Apps | (Gls) |
| 2009–2010 | Voždovac | 24 | (2) |
| 2010–2016 | Spartak Subotica | 39 | (0) |
| 2012 | → Radnički Sombor (loan) | 17 | (1) |
| 2012 | → Palić (loan) | 15 | (3) |
| 2016–2017 | ČSK Čelarevo | 23 | (5) |
| 2017–2019 | TSC | 17 | (0) |
| 2019– | Bačka 1901 | | |
- * Club domestic league appearances and goals as of 7 April 2018

Nebojša Mezei (Serbian Cyrillic: Небојша Мезеи; born 15 February 1991) is a Serbian football defender who plays for Bačka 1901.

== Club career ==
Born in Subotica, Mezei was a member of FK Partizan youth categories. He started his senior career with Voždovac. After the 2009–10 season, he spent in the Serbian League Belgrade scoring 2 goals on 24 matches, Mezei left the club and returned to his home town. Mezei joined Serbian SuperLiga side Spartak Subotica in 2010. During the first season with the club, he noted 5 appearances at total. As he did not make any official appearance in the first half of the 2011–12 season, Mezei was loaned to Radnički Sombor in the winter-break. He collected all 17 matches in the second half-season in the Serbian First League, scoring a goal in the 26 fixture match against Kolubara. Previously, he was also marked as the man of the match in 19 fixture, when he assisted to Miroslav Paunović for 1–0 victory against Radnički Niš. Later, same year, he was also loaned to Palić. After he spent the whole 2012 loaning out, Mezei returned in Spartak Subotica at the beginning of 2013 and signed a new four-year contract with club. Having a limited minutage, Mezei was mostly used as a back-up player in a period between 2013 and 2015. He started the 2015–16 Serbian SuperLiga season as a first squad player, but later injured and the rest of season out of the field. He was also with the team at the beginning of 2016–17 season, but terminated the contract shortly after and moved to ČSK Čelarevo.

== Career statistics ==
As of 1 June 2017

| Club | Season | League | | | Cup | | Continental | | Other | | Total | |
| Club | Season | Division | Apps | Goals | Apps | Goals | Apps | Goals | Apps | Goals | Apps | Goals |
|---|---|---|---|---|---|---|---|---|---|---|---|---|
| Voždovac | 2009–10 | Serbian League Belgrade | 24 | 2 | — | | — | | — | | 24 | 2 |
| Spartak Subotica | 2010–11 | Serbian SuperLiga | 4 | 0 | 1 | 0 | 0 | 0 | — | | 5 | 0 |
| Spartak Subotica | 2011–12 | Serbian SuperLiga | 0 | 0 | 0 | 0 | — | | — | | 0 | 0 |
| Spartak Subotica | 2012–13 | Serbian SuperLiga | 10 | 0 | — | | — | | — | | 10 | 0 |
| Spartak Subotica | 2013–14 | Serbian SuperLiga | 9 | 0 | 2 | 0 | — | | — | | 11 | 0 |
| Spartak Subotica | 2014–15 | Serbian SuperLiga | 7 | 0 | 2 | 0 | — | | — | | 9 | 0 |
| Spartak Subotica | 2015–16 | Serbian SuperLiga | 9 | 0 | 0 | 0 | — | | — | | 9 | 0 |
| Spartak Subotica | 2016–17 | Serbian SuperLiga | 0 | 0 | — | | — | | — | | 0 | 0 |
| Spartak Subotica | Total | | 39 | 0 | 5 | 0 | 0 | 0 | — | | 44 | 0 |
| Radnički Sombor (loan) | 2011–12 | Serbian First League | 17 | 1 | — | | — | | — | | 17 | 1 |
| Palić (loan) | 2012–13 | Serbian League Vojvodina | 15 | 3 | — | | — | | — | | 15 | 3 |
| ČSK Čelarevo | 2016–17 | Serbian First League | 23 | 5 | 1 | 0 | — | | — | | 24 | 5 |
| Career total | | | 95 | 11 | 6 | 0 | 0 | 0 | — | | 101 | 11 |
