= Dejan Kekezović =

Serbian footballer

Personal information
- Full name: Dejan Kekezović
- Date of birth: 6 June 1982 (age 44)
- Place of birth: Subotica, SR Serbia, SFR Yugoslavia
- Height: 1.72 m (5 ft 8 in)
- Position: Midfielder

Senior career*
Years	Team	Apps	(Gls)
1998–1999	Radnički Bajmok	23	(2)
1999–2001	Spartak Subotica	58	(2)
2002–2006	Smederevo	102	(3)
2006–2008	Radnički Bajmok		
2008–2011	Hajduk Kula	54	(4)
2011	→ Radnički Bajmok (loan)		
2012–2015	Bačka Topola		

International career
1998	FR Yugoslavia U16	4	(0)
2000–2001	FR Yugoslavia U18	8	(1)
2002	FR Yugoslavia U21	1	(1)
- * Club domestic league appearances and goals as of 6 August 2016

Dejan Kekezović (Serbian Cyrillic: Дејан Кекезовић; born 6 June 1982) is a Serbian retired footballer who played as a midfielder.

== Club career ==
Kekezović started out at Radnički Bajmok, before joining Spartak Subotica. He subsequently made his top flight debut in 1999, aged 17. In the 2002 winter transfer window, Kekezović moved to Sartid Smederevo. He spent the following four and a half years at the club, winning the Serbia and Montenegro Cup in 2003. After leaving Smederevo in the summer of 2006, Kekezović returned to his parent club Radnički Bajmok.

In the summer of 2008, Kekezović signed with Serbian SuperLiga club Hajduk Kula. He eventually switched to Bačka Topola in the 2012 winter transfer window. Kekezović spent three and a half years with the club, before leaving in the summer of 2015.

== International career ==
Kekezović represented FR Yugoslavia at the 2001 UEFA European Under-18 Championship. He also made one appearance for the FR Yugoslavia U21s during the 2004 UEFA European Under-21 Championship qualification, scoring a goal in a 3–3 draw with Finland.

Kekezović also played for the national team of Croatian national minority in Serbia.

== Statistics ==
Club	Season	League		Continental	
Club	Season	Apps	Goals	Apps	Goals
Spartak Subotica	1999–00	20	0	0	0
Spartak Subotica	Total	20	0	0	0
Smederevo	2001–02	12	0	0	0
Smederevo	2002–03	20	1	3	0
Smederevo	2003–04	23	0	1	0
Smederevo	2004–05	21	0	4	0
Smederevo	2005–06	26	2	2	0
Smederevo	Total	102	3	10	0
Career total		122	3	10	0

== Honours ==
Sartid Smederevo

- Serbia and Montenegro Cup: 2002–03
