= Nikola Radojičić =

Serbian footballer

Personal information
- Full name: Nikola Radojičić
- Date of birth: 19 January 1992 (age 34)
- Place of birth: Valjevo, FR Yugoslavia
- Height: 1.76 m (5 ft 9 in)
- Position: Full-back

Team information
- Current team: FK Radnik Ub

Youth career
- 2007–2010: Zemun

Senior career*
Years	Team	Apps	(Gls)
2010	Železničar Beograd		
2011–2012	Kolubara Lazarevac	39	(0)
2012	Inter Zaprešić	5	(0)
2013	Mladost Lučani	3	(0)
2014	Lokomotíva Košice	0	(0)
2014–2015	Metalac Gornji Milanovac	5	(0)
2015–2016	Železničar Lajkovac		
2016–2021	Jedinstvo Ub		
2021–2022	TEK Sloga		
2022–2023	Jedinstvo Ub	25	(2)
2023–2024	FK Vrelo Sport		
2024–	FK Radnik Ub		
- * Club domestic league appearances and goals as of 12 April 2015

Nikola Radojičić (Serbian Cyrillic: Никола Радојичић; born 19 January 1992) is a Serbian football defender who plays for FK Radnik Ub.
