= Ilija Tutnjević =

Serbian footballer

Personal information
- Full name: Ilija Tutnjević
- Date of birth: 23 April 1994 (age 32)
- Place of birth: Vrbas, FR Yugoslavia
- Height: 1.83 m (6 ft 0 in)
- Position: Midfielder

Team information
- Current team: Bečej

Senior career*
Years	Team	Apps	(Gls)
2011–2013	OFK Beograd	1	(0)
2012	→ Sloga Temerin (loan)	6	(1)
2013	→ Bačka Topola (loan)	12	(0)
2014–2015	Jedinstvo Užice	30	(1)
2015–2016	Cement Beočin	16	(0)
2016–2018	OFK Odžaci	18	(0)
2018–2019	Hajduk 1912	54	(2)
2020–	Bečej		

International career
2012	Serbia U19	2	(0)
- * Club domestic league appearances and goals as of 13 October 2019

Ilija Tutnjević (Serbian Cyrillic: Илија Тутњевић; born 23 April 1994) is a Serbian football midfielder who plays for Bečej.
