= Novica Milenović =

Serbian footballer

Personal information
- Full name: Novica Milenović
- Date of birth: 14 January 1989 (age 37)
- Place of birth: Belgrade, SFR Yugoslavia
- Height: 1.84 m (6 ft 1/2 in)
- Position: Left back

Youth career
- OFK Beograd

Senior career*
Years	Team	Apps	(Gls)
2007–2012	OFK Beograd	45	(0)
2010	→ Radnički Sombor (loan)	0	(0)
2012	Spartak Subotica	2	(0)
2013	Voždovac	3	(0)
2014	Echallens	3	(0)
2015–2016	AF LUC-Dorigny		
2016	Dardania Lausanne	11	(0)
2017	Forward-Morges		

International career
2007–2008	Serbia U19	4	(1)
- * Club domestic league appearances and goals

Novica Milenović (Serbian Cyrillic: Новица Миленовић; born 14 January 1989) is a Serbian retired footballer.

He played in Switzerland for Echallens and AF LUC-Dorigny.
