= Nemanja Kostić =

Serbian association football player

Personal information
- Date of birth: 23 April 2004 (age 22)
- Position: Goalkeeper

Team information
- Current team: Radnik Surdulica
- Number: 1

Senior career*
Years	Team	Apps	(Gls)
2020–	Radnik Surdulica	2	(0)
- * Club domestic league appearances and goals as of 18:02, 13 June 2020 (UTC)

Nemanja Kostić (Serbian Cyrillic: Немања Костић, born 23 April 2004) is a Serbian footballer who currently plays as a goalkeeper for Radnik Surdulica.

== Career statistics ==
=== Club ===
As of 13 June 2020.

Club	Season	League			Cup		Other		Total	
Club	Season	Division	Apps	Goals	Apps	Goals	Apps	Goals	Apps	Goals
Radnik Surdulica	2019–20	Serbian SuperLiga	1	0	0	0	0	0	1	0
Career total			1	0	0	0	0	0	1	0
