= Mladen Popović =

Serbian footballer

Personal information
- Full name: Mladen Popović
- Date of birth: 29 August 1988 (age 38)
- Place of birth: Raška, SFR Yugoslavia
- Height: 1.88 m (6 ft 2 in)
- Position: Forward

Youth career
- 1997–2005: Rudar Baljevac

Senior career*
Years	Team	Apps	(Gls)
2006–2007	INON	3	(0)
2007–2008	Sloga Kraljevo	21	(3)
2008–2009	Sloboda Užice	26	(7)
2009	Vujić Valjevo	13	(9)
2009–2010	→ OFK Beograd (loan)	4	(0)
2010–2012	OFK Beograd	21	(7)
2012–2013	Hajduk Kula	7	(0)
2013–2014	Novi Pazar	34	(2)
2014	Velež Mostar	9	(3)
2015	Sloboda Užice	13	(1)
2015–2016	Jagodina	22	(3)
2016	Inđija	4	(0)
2017	Novi Pazar	3	(1)
2017	Petrovac	11	(2)
2018	Pajde Möhlin	22	(15)
2019	Cement Beočin	14	(2)
2019	Dinamo Vranje	13	(2)
- * Club domestic league appearances and goals as of 30 January 2020

Mladen Popović (Serbian Cyrillic: Младен Поповић; born 29 August 1988) is a Serbian retired footballer.

== Career ==
Born in Raška, Popović began his career in his native Serbia playing for Rudar Baljevac. In the 2009/10 season he moved to OFK Beograd and played in the Serbian SuperLiga. In January 2013 he moved to Novi Pazar and continue to play in Serbian SuperLiga.
