= Park Tae-gyu =

South Korean footballer

Park Tae-Gyu
Personal information
- Full name: Park Tae-Gyu
- Date of birth: 21 February 1990 (age 36)
- Place of birth: Seoul, South Korea
- Height: 1.83 m (6 ft 0 in)
- Position: Forward

Youth career
- 2002–2006: FC Seoul
- 2006–2008: Bežanija

Senior career*
Years	Team	Apps	(Gls)
2008–2009	Bežanija	1	(0)
2010–2011	Gimhae City	52	(15)
2011	Suwon City	10	(0)
2011–2012	Busan Transportation Corporation	24	(1)
2012	BSK Borča	0	(0)
2013	Spartak Subotica	0	(0)

International career
2009–2011	South Korea U20	2	(0)
- * Club domestic league appearances and goals

Park Tae-Gyu (Korean: 박태규; born 21 February 1990) is a Korean football forward.

He previously played with Serbian club FK Bežanija. In summer 2012 he joined Serbian SuperLiga side FK BSK Borča.
