= Kim Seon-il =

Kim Seon-il may refer to:

- Kim Seon-il (footballer)
- Kim Seon-il (sport shooter)

== See also ==
- Kim Sun-il, terrorism victim
