= Marko Stančetić =

Serbian footballer

Personal information
- Full name: Marko Stančetić
- Date of birth: 22 July 1989 (age 37)
- Place of birth: Novi Sad, SFR Yugoslavia
- Height: 1.85 m (6 ft 1 in)
- Position: Winger

Youth career
- Vojvodina

Senior career*
| Years | Team | Apps | (Gls) |
| 2007–2010 | Vojvodina | 0 | (0) |
| 2007–2008 | → Sloga Temerin (loan) | 10 | (2) |
| 2008–2009 | → Proleter Novi Sad (loan) | 19 | (1) |
| 2009 | → Palić (loan) | 3 | (0) |
| 2010 | → Mačva Šabac (loan) | 11 | (0) |
| 2010–2011 | Cement Beočin | 23 | (6) |
| 2011–2012 | Spartak Subotica | 0 | (0) |
| 2012 | → Radnički Sombor (loan) | 17 | (0) |
| 2012 | Novi Sad | 17 | (1) |
| 2013–2014 | Proleter Novi Sad | 37 | (7) |
| 2014–2015 | Karaiskakis | 24 | (3) |
| 2015–2016 | Napredak Kruševac | 2 | (0) |
| 2016–2017 | Mačva Šabac | 24 | (4) |
| 2017 | Kolubara | 9 | (1) |
| 2018 | TSC | 7 | (0) |
| 2018–2019 | Cement Beočin | 31 | (4) |
| 2019-2020 | Borac Šajkaš | | |
| 2021 | Novi Sad | | |
- * Club domestic league appearances and goals as of 8 June 2019

Marko Stančetić (Serbian Cyrillic: Марко Станчетић; born 22 July 1989) is a Serbian football retired winger.

== Honours ==
Napredak Kruševac

- Serbian First League: 2015–16
