= Duško Sakan =

Bosnian footballer (born 1989)

Personal information
- Full name: Dušan Sakan
- Date of birth: 3 March 1989 (age 37)
- Place of birth: Šipovo, SFR Yugoslavia
- Height: 1.86 m (6 ft 1 in)
- Position: Midfielder

Team information
- Current team: Gorica Šipovo

Senior career*
Years	Team	Apps	(Gls)
2006–2007	Borac Banja Luka	9	(0)
2007–2009	Posušje	38	(2)
2009–2011	Borac Banja Luka	35	(0)
2012	Rad	4	(0)
2012	→ Rudar Prijedor (loan)	8	(0)
2013–2014	Sloboda Mrkonjić Grad		
2014–2017	Metalleghe BSI	36+	(4+)
2017	Čelik Zenica	7	(0)
2017	Ängelholm	11	(0)
2017–2018	Sloga Gornje Crnjelovo		
2018–2020	St. Johann	42	(4)
2020	Gorica Šipovo		

International career
2007	Bosnia and Herzegovina U-19	15	(3)
2009	Bosnia and Herzegovina U-21	2	(0)
2011	Bosnia and Herzegovina XI	1	(0)
- * Club domestic league appearances and goals as of 23 December 2017

Duško Sakan (Serbian Cyrillic: Душко Сакан; born 3 March 1989) is a Bosnian-Herzegovinian professional footballer who plays as a midfielder for Gorica Šipovo.

== Club career ==
Born in Šipovo (SR Bosnia and Herzegovina, SFR Yugoslavia) on March 3 1989, Sakan begin his career in the season 2006–07 playing with FK Borac Banja Luka. The following season, he joined another Premier League of Bosnia and Herzegovina side, NK Posušje where he stayed two seasons. In summer 2009 he returned to Borac and played with them in the following two and a half seasons. After finishing the 2009–10 season in third, the following year they became champions of the 2010–11 Premier League of Bosnia and Herzegovina. During the winter break of 2011–12, Sakan became one of the acquisitions of FK Rad for the second half of the 2011–12 Serbian SuperLiga.

He played two seasons for Austrian third-tier side TSV St. Johann.

== International career ==
After having been part of the Bosnian-Herzegovinian U-19 and U-21 teams, Sakan made an appearance for an unofficial Bosnia and Herzegovina selection in 2011. at 16 December 2011, in a friendly match against Poland.

He was also part of the Republika Srpska national football team (league selection) in September 2013.

== Honours ==
Borac Banja Luka

- Bosnian-Herzegovinian Premier League: 2010–11
- Bosnian-Herzegovinian Cup: 2009–10
- Republika Srpska Cup: 2010–11
