= Đorđe Lazović (footballer, born 1992) =

Serbian footballer

Personal information
- Date of birth: 16 November 1992 (age 33)
- Place of birth: Ivanjica, FR Yugoslavia
- Height: 1.96 m (6 ft 5 in)
- Position: Goalkeeper

Youth career
- Vojvodina

Senior career*
Years	Team	Apps	(Gls)
2010–2014	Vojvodina	0	(0)
2010	→ Palić (loan)	14	(0)
2012	→ Dunav Stari Banovci (loan)	14	(0)
2012–2014	→ Javor Ivanjica (loan)	18	(0)
2014–2015	Spartak Subotica	0	(0)
2016	OFK Beograd	0	(0)
2017–2018	Partizan	0	(0)
2018	Radnički Niš	0	(0)
2019–2021	Javor Ivanjica	65	(0)
2022	Radnički Kragujevac	0	(0)
- * Club domestic league appearances and goals as of 9 May 2023

Đorđe Lazović (Serbian Cyrillic: Ђорђе Лазовић; born 16 November 1992) is a Serbian retired footballer who played as a goalkeeper.

== Club career ==
Lazović came through the youth system of Vojvodina, being promoted to the senior squad in early 2010. He was loaned to Serbian League Vojvodina club Palić ahead of the 2010–11 season, before returning to Vojvodina in early 2011. After the end of the first part of the 2011–12 season, Lazović went on loan to Dunav Stari Banovci in early 2012.

In the summer of 2012, Lazović moved on loan to Javor Ivanjica. He spent two seasons at the club, making his Serbian SuperLiga debuts in 2013. After leaving Ivanjica in the summer of 2014, Lazović was on the rosters of Spartak Subotica and OFK Beograd, however failed to make a competitive debut.

In late 2016, early 2017, Lazović trained with Partizan. Shortly after he signed a two-year contract with club, he was optionally loaned to satellite club Teleoptik until the end of 2016–17 season, but stayed in club playing with reserves. He released by the club on 29 January 2018, after which he moved to Radnički Niš.

== International career ==
In 2013 and 2014, Lazović received several call-ups for the Serbia national under-21 team
