= Marko Nikolić (footballer, born August 1989) =

Serbian footballer

Personal information
- Full name: Marko Nikolić
- Date of birth: 27 August 1989 (age 37)
- Place of birth: Belgrade, SFR Yugoslavia
- Height: 1.69 m (5 ft 7 in)
- Position: Midfielder

Senior career*
Years	Team	Apps	(Gls)
2008–2013	Smederevo	6	(0)
2012–	→ Kolonija Kovin (loan)		
2013–2014	Bačka Palanka		
2014–2018	Srem Jakovo		
2018–2020	Tek Sloga		
- * Club domestic league appearances and goals as of 13:13, 20 May 2012 (UTC)

Marko Nikolić (Serbian Cyrillic: Марко Николић; born 27 August 1989) is a Serbian retired football midfielder.
