= Marko Šimić (footballer, born 1985) =

Croatian footballer

Personal information
- Full name: Marko Šimić
- Date of birth: 8 September 1985 (age 41)
- Place of birth: Valjevo, SR Serbia, SFR Yugoslavia
- Height: 1.87 m (6 ft 1 1/2 in)
- Position: Goalkeeper

Youth career
- Dinamo Zagreb

Senior career*
Years	Team	Apps	(Gls)
2004–2010	Croatia Sesvete	110	(0)
2010	→ ZET (loan)	12	(0)
2010–2012	Jagodina	37	(0)
2012–2013	Sanat Naft	7	(0)
2013	Radnički 1923	0	(0)
2014	Novi Pazar	10	(0)
Total		176	(0)

International career
2001–2002	Croatia U17	3	(0)
2003	Croatia U18	5	(0)
2002–2003	Croatia U19	6	(0)
2004	Croatia U20	2	(0)
2006	Croatia U21	1	(0)
- * Club domestic league appearances and goals

Marko Šimić (born 8 September 1985) is a Croatian retired professional footballer who played as a goalkeeper.

== Club career ==
After having played in the youth teams of NK Dinamo Zagreb, Šimić later played as senior with NK Croatia Sesvete in the Croatian First League. He was playing with Croatian side NK ZET when, in summer 2010, he moved to Serbia and signed with FK Jagodina. During 2011 he received Serbian citizenship thus not counting as foreigner while in Serbia anymore. His fine performances during the 2011–12 season earned him the title of best goalkeeper of the season.

== International career ==
Šimić represented Croatia internationally at youth level.

== Honours ==
Individual

- Serbian SuperLiga Team of the Season: 2011–12
