= Esmir Ahmetović =

Bosnian footballer

Personal information
- Full name: Esmir Ahmetović
- Date of birth: 17 January 1991 (age 35)
- Place of birth: Srebrenica, SFR Yugoslavia
- Height: 1.89 m (6 ft 2 1/2 in)
- Position: Left midfielder

Senior career*
Years	Team	Apps	(Gls)
–2011	NK Tuzla		
2012–2013	Jagodina	0	(0)
2012	→ Sloboda Tuzla (loan)		
2013–2014	ACS Poli Timișoara	2	(0)
2016	Bratstvo Gračanica	5	(0)
2017	Sinđelić Beograd	0	(0)
2019	Radnički Lukavac		
2019–2020	Orašje	11	(1)
2020	Zvijezda 09	1	(0)
2020–2021	Slaven Živinice	19	(0)
2021–2022	Orašje	13	(0)
- * Club domestic league appearances and goals as of 20:48, 9 March 2022 (UTC)

Esmir Ahmetović (born 17 January 1991) is a Bosnian footballer.

== Club career ==
Born in Srebrenica, SR Bosnia and Herzegovina, he played with NK Tuzla in Bosnian third-tier, before joining Serbian SuperLiga side FK Jagodina in the winter break of the 2011–12 season. He had a 2-weeks trial and impressed Jagodina coach Simo Krunić who gave green light for signing a 3-year contract with Ahmetović. However, still young and facing tough competition, he failed to make a league debut with Jagodina, so in summer 2012 he went on loan to the historical Bosnian side FK Sloboda Tuzla which had been relegated from the Bosnian Premier League and was now facing a season in the First League of the Federation of Bosnia and Herzegovina to fight for their return to the top-tier. Ahmetović played with them the first half of the 2012–13 season, but during the winter break he returned to Jagodina and stayed in the Serbian SuperLiga side in the second half of the season.

Ahmetović then signed with ACS Poli Timișoara in what was their inaugural season in the Romanian top-tier, and made 2 appearances with them in the 2013–14 Liga I. However, they finished 16th out of 18 clubs, and ended up relegated and Ahmetović left the club at the end of the season.

On March 8, 2016, he signed with Bosnian second-tier-side FK Bratstvo Gračanica.
