= Vladan Binić =

Czech former footballer

Personal information
- Full name: Vladan Binić
- Date of birth: 25 January 1987 (age 39)
- Place of birth: Niš, SFR Yugoslavia
- Height: 1.75 m (5 ft 9 in)
- Position: Winger

Youth career
- Sparta Prague

Senior career*
Years	Team	Apps	(Gls)
2006–2007	Sparta Prague B	14	(3)
2008–2010	Napredak Kruševac	54	(6)
2010–2012	Red Star Belgrade	0	(0)
2011	→ Radnički Kragujevac (loan)	6	(0)
2012	→ Spartak Subotica (loan)	3	(0)
2012–2013	Radnički Niš	21	(3)
2014	Leotar	6	(0)
2015	Radnik Surdulica	6	(0)
Total		110	(12)

International career
2004	Czech Republic U17	1	(0)
- * Club domestic league appearances and goals

Vladan Binić (Serbian Cyrillic: Владан Бинић; born 25 January 1987) is a retired footballer who played as a winger. Born in Yugoslavia, he represented the Czech Republic at youth level. He is the son of former Yugoslav international Dragiša Binić.

== Club career ==
Born in Niš, to a Serbian father, Dragiša, and a Czech mother, Martina, Binić spent the majority of his childhood in Prague. He joined Sparta Prague as a trainee and passed through the club's youth system. In the summer of 2005, Binić went on trial with Red Star Belgrade, but the deal was never finalized. He subsequently played for Sparta's reserve team in the third national tier, making 14 appearances and scoring three goals in the 2006–07 season.

In the 2008 winter transfer window, Binić returned to his homeland and joined Napredak Kruševac. He spent the next two-and-a-half years at the club, scoring six goals in the top flight of Serbian football. In June 2010, Binić was transferred to Red Star Belgrade. He eventually failed to make any league appearance in the 2010–11 season. Afterwards, Binić was loaned to Radnički Kragujevac (fall 2011) and Spartak Subotica (spring 2012).

In the summer of 2012, Binić signed with SuperLiga newcomers Radnički Niš. He also played for Leotar (spring 2014) and Radnik Surdulica (spring 2015), before retiring from the game.

== International career ==
At international level, Binić was capped for the Czech Republic U17s, making one appearance in 2004.

== Honours ==
Radnik Surdulica

- Serbian First League: 2014–15
