= Nenad Živanović =

Serbian footballer

Personal information
- Full name: Nenad Živanović
- Date of birth: 20 July 1980 (age 46)
- Place of birth: Valjevo, SFR Yugoslavia
- Height: 1.75 m (5 ft 9 in)
- Position: Defender

Senior career*
Years	Team	Apps	(Gls)
2001–2006	Valjevo		
2006–2010	Rimavská Sobota		
2010–2011	Valjevo	7	(0)
2011	→ Inđija (loan)	1	(0)
2011–2012	Inđija	11	(1)
2012	Metalac GM	15	(0)
2013	Sloga Kraljevo	7	(1)
- * Club domestic league appearances and goals as of 20:36, 15 September 2011 (UTC)

Nenad Živanović (born 20 July 1980) is a Serbian retired football defender.

Živanović made his first appearance in the Serbian Superliga for Inđija during the 2010–11 season.
