= Darko Fejsa =

Serbian professional footballer

Personal information
- Full name: Darko Fejsa
- Date of birth: 27 August 1987 (age 39)
- Place of birth: Vrbas, SFR Yugoslavia
- Height: 1.84 m (6 ft 1/2 in)
- Position: Left-back

Youth career
- Vrbas

Senior career*
| Years | Team | Apps | (Gls) |
| 2003–2004 | Vrbas | 13 | (0) |
| 2004–2006 | POFK Hajduk Kula | | |
| 2006–2012 | Hajduk Kula | 116 | (1) |
| 2012–2014 | Radnički Kragujevac | 27 | (1) |
- * Club domestic league appearances and goals as of 6 June 2017

Darko Fejsa (Serbian Cyrillic: Дарко Фејса; born 27 August 1987) is a Serbian retired footballer who played as a left-back. He is the older brother of Serbia international Ljubomir Fejsa.

== Career ==
Fejsa started out at his hometown club Vrbas, making his senior debut at the age of 16. He later moved to top-flight side Hajduk Kula and made over 100 league appearances. On the last day of the 2012 summer transfer window, Fejsa signed with fellow Serbian SuperLiga club Radnički Kragujevac.
