= Miroslav Gegić =

Serbian footballer

Personal information
- Full name: Miroslav Gegić
- Date of birth: 27 August 1984 (age 42)
- Place of birth: Smederevo, SFR Yugoslavia
- Height: 1.89 m (6 ft 2 1/2 in)
- Position: Centre-back

Youth career
- 1995–2002: Sartid Smederevo

Senior career*
Years	Team	Apps	(Gls)
2002–2010	Smederevo	46	(1)
2002–2003	→ Mladi Radnik (loan)	2	(0)
2003–2006	→ Železničar Smederevo (loan)	51	(5)
2006–2007	→ INON (loan)	26	(1)
2010	Okzhetpes	16	(0)
2011	Naters	13	(1)
2011–2012	Hajduk Kula	0	(0)
2012–2013	BSK Borča	3	(0)
2013	Smederevo	6	(0)
2013	Timok	1	(0)
2013–2018	Smederevo	22	(1)

International career
2002–2003	Serbia and Montenegro U19	4	(0)
- * Club domestic league appearances and goals as of 18 June 2014

Miroslav Gegić (Serbian Cyrillic: Мирослав Гегић; born 27 August 1984) is a Serbian retired football defender.

== Career ==
Gegić joined compatriot Dragan Dragutinović at Kazakhstan Premier League side FC Okzhetpes in June 2010. After spells playing abroad in Kazakhstan and Switzerland, Gegić returned to Serbia where he played for FK Hajduk Kula and FK BSK Borča before signing with Smederevo in 2013.
