= Peđa Jerinić =

Serbian footballer

Personal information
- Full name: Predrag Jerinić
- Date of birth: 5 December 1988 (age 37)
- Place of birth: Sarajevo, SFR Yugoslavia
- Height: 1.77 m (5 ft 10 in)
- Position: Midfielder

Senior career*
Years	Team	Apps	(Gls)
2006	Sinđelić Beograd	9	(0)
2007	Policajac Beograd		
2007–2008	Posavac	17	(3)
2008–2010	Teleoptik	47	(7)
2010–2012	Smederevo	45	(0)
2012	Hajduk Kula	1	(0)
2013	RFK Novi Sad	11	(0)
- * Club domestic league appearances and goals as of 8 September 2012

Peđa Jerinić (Serbian Cyrillic: Пеђа Јеринић, born 5 December 1988) is a Serbian retired football midfielder.

== Club career ==
Born in Sarajevo, SR Bosnia and Herzegovina, Jerinić played with lower league Belgrade based clubs Sinđelić, Policajac and Posavac before joining Teleoptik in 2008. In summer 2010 he moved to FK Smederevo, making his debut in the Serbian SuperLiga. In 2012, he transferred to another SuperLiga club, FK Hajduk Kula. The following half season he played with RFK Novi Sad in the Serbian First League.
