= Nebojša Stanojlović =

Serbian footballer

Personal information
- Full name: Nebojša Stanojlović
- Date of birth: 2 April 1989 (age 37)
- Place of birth: Šabac, SFR Yugoslavia
- Height: 1.87 m (6 ft 1 1/2 in)
- Position: Forward

Senior career*
Years	Team	Apps	(Gls)
2007	→ Vujić Voda (loan)	13	(1)
2008	→ Železničar Beograd (loan)	24	(5)
2009	→ Pobeda (loan)	15	(3)
2009	→ Srem Jakovo (loan)	10	(2)
2010	Novi Pazar	14	(4)
2010–2012	Metalac Gornji Milanovac	23	(1)
2012	Smederevo	0	(0)
2013	Mladost Lučani	17	(2)
2013	Mačva Šabac	5	(1)
2014	Novi Pazar	3	(0)
Total		124	(19)
- * Club domestic league appearances and goals as of November 5th, 2014

Nebojša Stanojlović (Serbian Cyrillic: Небојша Станојловић; born 2 April 1989) is a Serbian football forward.
