= Dušan Kolarević =

Serbian footballer (born 1987)

Personal information
- Full name: Dušan Kolarević
- Date of birth: 19 April 1987 (age 39)
- Place of birth: Niš, SFR Yugoslavia
- Height: 1.79 m (5 ft 10 in)
- Position: Defensive midfielder

Youth career
- 2004–2005: Red Star Belgrade

Senior career*
Years	Team	Apps	(Gls)
2005–2006	→ Bečej (loan)	4	(0)
2006–2007	Rheindorf Altach	0	(0)
2007–2008	Radnički Beograd	8	(0)
2007–2008	→ Hajduk Beograd (loan)	14	(1)
2008–2009	Hajduk Beograd	20	(1)
2009	Čukarički	3	(0)
2010–2012	Sinđelić Niš	46	(2)
2012	OFK Beograd	7	(0)
2012–2015	Radnički Niš	80	(2)
2015–2016	Rad	19	(0)
2016–2017	Temnić 1924		
- * Club domestic league appearances and goals

Dušan Kolarević (Serbian Cyrillic: Душан Коларевић; born 19 April 1987) is a former Serbian footballer who played as a midfielder.

His father, also named Dušan, owns a company in Ćićevac, engaged in wood economy.
