= Stefan Stojanović (footballer, born 1992) =

Serbian footballer

Personal information
- Full name: Stefan Stojanović
- Date of birth: 25 April 1992 (age 34)
- Place of birth: Belgrade, FR Yugoslavia
- Height: 1.78 m (5 ft 10 in)
- Position: Forward

Team information
- Current team: Skiljebo SK
- Number: 9

Senior career*
Years	Team	Apps	(Gls)
2010–2011	Zvižd Kučevo		
2011–2012	Mladi Radnik	22	(3)
2012–2014	Smederevo	27	(0)
2014	IFK Åmål		
2015	Konyaspor KIF		
2016	Juventus IF		
2017-2018	Bosnisk SK		
2021-	Skiljebo SK	3	(0)
- * Club domestic league appearances and goals as of 17:00, 18 June 2014 (UTC)

Stefan Stojanović (Serbian Cyrillic: Стефан Стојановић; born 25 April 1992) is a Serbian football forward who plays for Division 2 club Skiljebo SK.

== Career ==
=== FK Mladi Radnik (2011-2012) ===
Stojanović began his professional career with FK Mladi Radnik, scoring three goals in 22 appearances.

=== FK Smederevo 1924 (2012-2014) ===
Stojanović arrived at FK Smederevo 1924 on a free transfer, appearing in 27 matches.

=== Skiljebo SK (2021-) ===
After a hiatus, Stojanović signed with Skiljebo SK in 2021 and has appeared in three matches to date.
