= Igor Krmar =

Serbian footballer

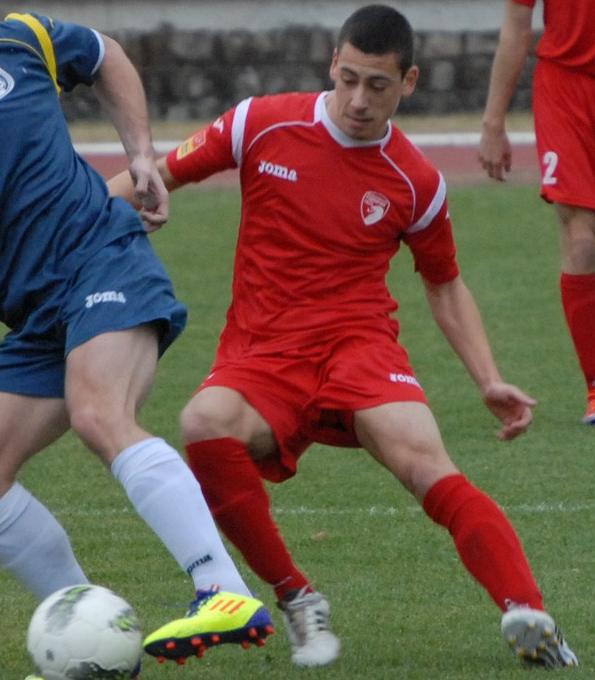
- Krmar in 2012

Personal information
- Full name: Igor Krmar
- Date of birth: 14 May 1991 (age 35)
- Place of birth: Vinkovci, SFR Yugoslavia
- Height: 1.76 m (5 ft 9 1/2 in)
- Position: Right back

Youth career
- Boleč
- Vinča
- 2003–2009: Red Star Belgrade

Senior career*
Years	Team	Apps	(Gls)
2009–2010	Mačva Šabac	27	(6)
2010–2012	Radnički Kragujevac	30	(0)
2011–2012	→ Slavija Sarajevo (loan)	14	(0)
2012–2013	Smederevo	23	(1)
2013	Bohemians Prague	2	(0)
2014	BSK Borča	29	(4)
2015	Mačva Šabac	14	(1)
2015	London City	12	(5)
2016	Slavija Sarajevo	7	(0)
2016–2017	Bežanija	16	(3)
2016	→ Hamilton City (loan)	14	(4)
2017	Sloboda Užice	15	(0)
2018	Rabotnički	9	(0)
2018	Atlantas	2	(0)
2019	Sloga Gornje Crnjelovo	14	(0)
2019	Zemun	16	(0)
2020	Dinamo 1945		
2021	Smederevo 1924		
2021	RSK Rabrovo		
2022	NK Leštane		
2022–2023	NK Hajduk Divos		
2023–2024	NK Boleč Grocka		
2024–	NK Dunavac Grocka		

International career
2007	Serbia U17	1	(0)
- * Club domestic league appearances and goals

Igor Krmar (Serbian Cyrillic: Игор Крмар; born 14 May 1991) is a Serbian footballer who plays as a defender.

== Career ==
=== Early years ===
Krmar was born in the Croatian town of Vinkovci at the outbreak of the Yugoslavian war his family fled to Boleč, a suburb of Belgrade. He started playing football in Boleč, later moving to nearby Vinča, where he was spotted by scouts and brought to Red Star Belgrade. Although he passed the complete youth ranks of Red Star, he first played professionally in the Serbian League West with Mačva Šabac, where he stayed for one year.

The next season, he joined the Kragujevac-based team Radnički 1923, with whom he earned a promotion to the highest league of Serbian football. In his first year in the Serbian SuperLiga, he received minimal playing time and was loaned to Slavija Sarajevo in the Premier League of Bosnia and Herzegovina, where he assisted the club in avoiding relegation. In the summer of 2012, he joined another Serbian SuperLiga club - Smederevo, where he spent the full season, playing 23 games and scoring 1 goal.

=== Europe ===
In 2013, Krmar had a short spell at Czech's Bohemians Prague, where he appeared in 2 matches. His stint in the Czech Republic was followed by a return to the Serbian second division with BSK Borča, where he spent the 2013-14 season. He re-signed with Borča the following season. In 2015, he played the autumn season with Mačva Šabac, appearing in 14 games and scoring 1 goal.

=== Canada ===
In the summer of 2016, he played in the Canadian Soccer League with London City. Krmar helped London secure a playoff berth by finishing eighth in the league's first division. Their participation in the postseason tournament ended in the opening round after a defeat by the Serbian White Eagles.

After the conclusion of the Canadian season, he returned to Slavija Sarajevo for a second spell, where he played 7 games. He left Sarajevo after they were relegated from the top tier.

Krmar returned to the Canadian circuit in late 2016 to play with Hamilton City. In his second season in the league, he helped Hamilton secure a playoff berth. In the opening round of the postseason, Hamilton defeated Scarborough SC. Hamilton's next opponents were the York Region Shooters, whom they defeated in a penalty shootout. He appeared in the championship final match, where the Serbs defeated Hamilton for the title.

=== Return to Serbia ===
Following his second Canadian stint, he returned to the Serbian second tier in the fall of 2016 to sign with Bežanija. Krmar was acquired by league rivals Sloboda Užice in the 2017 summer transfer market.

=== Macedonia ===
In the early winter of 2018, he signed a two-year contract with Macedonian First Football League side Rabotnički. In his single season in the Macedonian top-tier league, he appeared in 9 matches.

=== Lithuania ===
In 2018, he played abroad in the A Lyga with FK Atlantas.

=== Later career ===
In January 2019, Krmar joined Sloga Gornje Crnjelovo in the Bosnian-based First League of the Republika Srpska. In August 2019, he returned to the Serbian First League to play with Zemun. His tenure with Zemun was cut short as he left the club in December 2019.

In 2020, he was recruited to join FK Dinamo Pančevo in the Serbian League Vojvodina. He left Dinamo in the 2021 winter transfer market to join Smederevo 1924. The following season, he signed with FK RSK Rabrovo. Krmar would play the remainder of the 2021-22 season with FK Leštane. In the summer of 2022, he played with FK Hajduk Divos. After a season with Hajduk, he signed with FK Boleč Grocka. He was transferred to NK Dunavac Grocka in January 2024.

== International career ==
In 2007, Krmar debuted for the Serbia national under-17 football team.

== Honors ==
Hamilton City

- CSL Championship runner–up: 2016
