= Aleksandar Vasiljević (footballer, born 1982) =

Serbian footballer

Personal information
- Full name: Александар Васиљевић
- Date of birth: 19 June 1982 (age 44)
- Place of birth: Rudo, SFR Yugoslavia
- Height: 1.87 m (6 ft 2 in)
- Position: Centre-back

Senior career*
| Years | Team | Apps | (Gls) |
| 2003–2004 | Jedinstvo Surčin | 24 | (0) |
| 2004–2006 | Budućnost Dobanovci | 21 | (0) |
| 2006–2008 | Bežanija | 34 | (0) |
| 2008 | Qingdao Hailifeng | | |
| 2008–2009 | Sevojno | 8 | (0) |
| 2009–2010 | Mladi Radnik | 23 | (0) |
| 2010 | Irtysh Pavlodar | 19 | (0) |
| 2010–2011 | Jagodina | 21 | (0) |
| 2011–2012 | Hajduk Kula | 11 | (0) |
| 2012 | Leotar | 5 | (0) |
| 2013 | Novi Pazar | 14 | (0) |
| 2013 | Donji Srem | 5 | (0) |
| 2014 | Voždovac | 9 | (0) |
| 2014 | Napredak Kruševac | 3 | (0) |
| 2014 | Sloga Kraljevo | 4 | (0) |
| 2015–2016 | ASK Elektra | | |
| Total | | 201 | (0) |
- * Club domestic league appearances and goals

Aleksandar Vasiljević (Serbian Cyrillic: Александар Васиљевић; born 19 June 1982) is a retired Bosnian Serb footballer.

Born in Rudo, SR Bosnia and Herzegovina, he spent most of his career in Serbia.
