= Gjorgji Tanushev =

Macedonian footballer

Gjorgji Tanušev
Personal information
- Date of birth: 7 January 1991 (age 35)
- Place of birth: Strumica, SFR Yugoslavia
- Height: 1.76 m (5 ft 9 1/2 in)
- Position: Attacking midfielder

Team information
- Current team: Pelister
- Number: 22

Senior career*
Years	Team	Apps	(Gls)
2009–2010	Belasica		
2010–2012	Sloboda Užice	11	(0)
2012	Proleter Novi Sad	45	(4)
2014	Kolubara	11	(0)
2015	Horizont Turnovo	31	(5)
2016	Bregalnica Štip	13	(6)
2016–2017	Sileks	34	(2)
2017	Borec Veles		
2018	Sileks	8	(0)
2018–2019	Pobeda	23	(6)
2019–2020	Akademija Pandev	19	(1)
2020–2021	Pelister	19	(2)
2021–2022	Sileks		
2022–2023	Gostivari		
2023–	Pelister		

International career
2007	Macedonia U-17	3	(0)
2008	Macedonia U-19	6	(0)
2011	Macedonia U-21	1	(0)
- * Club domestic league appearances and goals as of 27 September 2021

Gjorgji Tanušev (Macedonian: Ѓopѓи Taнушeв, born 7 January 1991) is a Macedonian football midfielder playing for Macedonian Second Football League club Pelister.

== Club career ==
Born in Strumica, Macedonia, he had started playing with local club FK Belasica before moving to Serbia in summer 2010 to sign with a newly promoted Serbian SuperLiga side FK Sloboda Point Sevojno, a club that was renamed that summer after being known as FK Sloboda Užice and merged with FK Sevojno and taking their spot in the promotion to the top Serbian league. In beginning of the 2011–12 season the clubs restored his former name. Tanušev moved in summer 2012 to Serbian First League side FK Proleter Novi Sad.

== International career ==
While still playing with FK Belasica, Tanušev has been part of the Macedonian U-17 team and since 2010 has been a member of the Macedonian U-19 team and in March 2011 he made his debut for the Macedonian U-21 team.

== External sources ==
- Gjorgji Tanushev at Utakmica.rs (in Serbian)
