= Nemanja Dabić =

Serbian footballer

Personal information
- Date of birth: 20 September 1986 (age 40)
- Place of birth: Sombor, SFR Yugoslavia
- Height: 1.90 m (6 ft 3 in)
- Position: Defender

Team information
- Current team: ZAC Sombor

Senior career*
Years	Team	Apps	(Gls)
2004–2005	Polet Rastina	22	(2)
2005–2007	Solunac Rastina		
2006–2011	Radnički Sombor	98	(0)
2012	Hajduk Kula	4	(0)
2012	RFK Novi Sad	1	(0)
2012–2014	Feniks		
2014–2015	Mladost VO	24	(2)
2015	Tekstilac		
2016-2020	SC Mannswörth	108	(14)
2021-	ZAC Sombor		
- * Club domestic league appearances and goals

Nemanja Dabić (Serbian Cyrillic: Немања Дабић; born 20 September 1986) is a Serbian footballer who plays for ZAC Sombor. He is a left-back, defender player.
