= Njegoš Goločevac =

Serbian footballer (born 1983)

Personal information
- Full name: Njegoš Goločevac
- Date of birth: 21 August 1983 (age 43)
- Place of birth: Priboj, SFR Yugoslavia
- Height: 1.73 m (5 ft 8 in)
- Position: Midfielder

Senior career*
Years	Team	Apps	(Gls)
2001–2002	Remont Čačak	1	(0)
2002–2003	FAP		
2003–2009	Sevojno	193	(34)
2009	Oțelul Galați	3	(0)
2010–2011	Sloboda Užice	31	(0)
2012	Hajduk Kula	14	(2)
2012	Leotar	13	(0)
2013	Kolubara	12	(0)
2014	Nordvärmland FF	8	(0)
2014–2015	FAP		
2016	Västanviks AIF	20	(6)
2017	Nora BK	19	(3)
2018-2019	IFK Ås	16	(2)
- * Club domestic league appearances and goals as of 2 August 2024

Njegoš Goločevac (Serbian Cyrillic: Његош Голочевац; born 21 August 1983) is a Serbian former professional footballer who played as a midfielder.

== Career ==
Goločevac spent six seasons at Sevojno, before transferring to Romanian champions Oțelul Galați in June 2009. He made only three league appearances for the club, before being released. In the summer of 2010, Goločevac joined Sloboda Užice, following the club's merger with Sevojno.

After a short spell with Nordvärmland FF in Sweden, Goločevac returned to his hometown club FAP in July 2014. He was the team's captain in the 2014–15 season, helping them win promotion to the Serbian League West. Eventually, Goločevac left the club during the summer.

Subsequently, Goločevac moved back to Sweden and signed with Västanviks AIF. He scored six league goals from 19 games in the 2016 Div 3 Västra Svealand.

== Honours ==
Sevojno

- Serbian Cup: Runner-up 2008–09
