= Vladimir Matić =

Serbian footballer (born 1983)

Personal information
- Date of birth: 12 July 1983 (age 43)
- Place of birth: Belgrade, SFR Yugoslavia
- Height: 1.80 m (5 ft 11 in)
- Position: Striker

Senior career*
Years	Team	Apps	(Gls)
2001–2003	GSP Polet		
2003–2006	Posavac	51	(25)
2006–2009	BSK Borča	111	(24)
2010	Posavac		
2010	Novi Pazar	16	(4)
2011	Gandzasar	26	(4)
2012	Novi Pazar	6	(0)
2012	Grbalj	14	(1)
2013	BSK Borča	12	(0)
2013	Jošanica	13	(2)
2014	Dolina Padina	9	(2)
2014	Smederevo	10	(1)
2015	Osečina		
2015	Turbina Vreoci	13	(1)
2016	Jedinstvo Stara Pazova		
2016–2017	Jedinstvo Surčin		
2017–2018	BSK Batajnica		
2019–2022	Tempo Frankfurt	46	(27)
- * Club domestic league appearances and goals as of 5 July 2018

Vladimir Matić (Serbian Cyrillic: Владимир Матић; born 12 July 1983) is a Serbian former professional footballer who played as a striker. He is best remembered for his time at BSK Borča, making over 100 league appearances and scoring 24 goals for the side.

During his journeyman career, Matić played for numerous clubs in his homeland, also having two brief spells abroad in Armenia and Montenegro.

== Honours ==
BSK Borča

- Serbian First League: 2008–09
