= Miloš Đorđević =

Serbian footballer

Personal information
- Full name: Miloš Đorđević
- Date of birth: 7 June 1992 (age 34)
- Place of birth: Kragujevac, FR Yugoslavia
- Height: 1.87 m (6 ft 2 in)
- Position: Striker

Team information
- Current team: Pomoravlje 1946 Vlaški Do

Youth career
- 2002–2002: Fitnes Kragujevac
- 2005–2009: Radnički Kragujevac
- 2010–2011: PSV Eindhoven

Senior career*
Years	Team	Apps	(Gls)
2008–2010	Radnički Kragujevac	1	(0)
2012	Radnički Kragujevac	0	(0)
2012–2013	Smederevo	8	(0)
2014	Pobeda Beloševac	14	(6)
2014–2015	Bežanija	28	(5)
2015	RNK Split	3	(0)
2016	Bežanija	5	(0)
2016	Dinamo Vranje	10	(3)
2017	BSK Borča	11	(2)
2017-2018	Sileks	29	(4)
2018	Zlatibor Čajetina		
2019	Radnički Kragujevac	9	(0)
2019-2022	Šumadija 1903		
2022-	Pomoravlje 1946 Vlaški Do		
- * Club domestic league appearances and goals as of 15 October 2016

Miloš Đorđević (Serbian Cyrillic: Милош Ђорђевић; born 7 June 1992) is a Serbian football striker.

== Career ==
A native of Kragujevac, Đorđević started out at the local Fitnes football school before moving to Radnički Kragujevac's academy in 2005. In November 2008 he made his first team debut for the third-tier club in the match against FK Inon Požarevac, coming in the 88th minute for Dragan Ristić. That would remain his only cap in the following two seasons. In April 2010 he went on trial at PSV Eindhoven and passed, signing a 1-year contract with possibility of further 2 years in June 2010., as the most expensive player of the youth team. He didn't make the first team, however, playing only for the youth setup, so his contract wasn't prolonged, and he went on trial at K.R.C. Genk

Not passing the trial, he returned to Kragujevac in the winter break, signing for FK Radnički 1923 again. He remained for half a season there, before moving on to FK Smederevo in the Serbian SuperLiga. Unable to break in to the first team there properly, he joined the third-tier FK Pobeda Beloševac from Kragujevac for the spring part of the 2013/2014 season. He spent the 2014-2015 season at the second-tier FK Bežanija.

Đorđević went on trial at the Croatian Prva HNL team RNK Split in the summer of 2015, and passed it, signing a two-year contract in August 2015.
