= Yaw Antwi =

Ghanaian footballer (born 1985)

Personal information
- Full name: Yaw Antwi
- Date of birth: 15 June 1985 (age 41)
- Place of birth: Sunyani, Ghana
- Height: 1.75 m (5 ft 9 in)
- Position: Striker

Team information
- Current team: Berekum Chelsea

Senior career*
| Years | Team | Apps | (Gls) |
| 2004–2005 | Bofoakwa Tano | - | (-) |
| 2006–2009 | Liberty Professionals | - | (-) |
| 2009–2010 | Napredak Kruševac | 26 | (9) |
| 2010–2013 | Vojvodina | 23 | (3) |
| 2012 | → Metalac Gornji Milanovac (loan) | 1 | (0) |
| 2012 | → Bežanija (loan) | 0 | (0) |
| 2014 | Timok | 14 | (5) |
| 2014 | Inđija | 10 | (2) |
| 2017–2019 | Berekum Chelsea | - | (-) |

International career
| 2008–2010 | Ghana | 3 | (1) |
- * Club domestic league appearances and goals as of 6 August 2021

Yaw Antwi (born 15 June 1985) is a Ghanaian professional footballer who plays as a striker. He represented Ghana at international level.

== Club career ==
Born in Sunyani, Antwi played with Bofoakwa Tano and Liberty Professionals in the Ghana Premier League, becoming one of the most prolific strikers in the country.

In the summer of 2009, Antwi moved to Serbia and signed with SuperLiga side Napredak Kruševac. He was the club's top scorer during the 2009–10 season with nine goals in 26 appearances, but failed to save the club from relegation. In July 2010, Antwi was transferred to Vojvodina, signing a three-year deal. He was also sent on loan to Metalac Gornji Milanovac and Bežanija during his contract with Vojvodina.

After six months without a club, Antwi signed with First League side Timok in the winter of 2014. He scored five goals in 14 appearances until the end of the 2013–14 season.

== International career ==
Antwi scored on his official international debut for Ghana in a friendly match against South Africa on 15 October 2008. He made two more appearances for the Black Stars in 2010.

Antwi also represented his country at the 2009 African Nations Championship, scoring two goals, as the team finished runners-up of the competition.
