= Milan Vukašinović =

Serbian footballer

Personal information
- Full name: Milan Vukašinović
- Date of birth: 31 May 1982 (age 44)
- Place of birth: Bor, SFR Yugoslavia
- Height: 1.80 m (5 ft 11 in)
- Position: Forward

Senior career*
Years	Team	Apps	(Gls)
2001–2002	Zvezdara	15	(0)
2002–2003	OFK Niš	27	(10)
2003–2004	Jedinstvo Surčin	29	(16)
2004–2005	Radnički Obrenovac	32	(12)
2005	Hajduk Beograd	13	(10)
2006	BASK	19	(7)
2006–2007	Čukarički	9	(3)
2007–2008	Hajduk Beograd	12	(4)
2008	→ Voždovac (loan)	10	(5)
2008–2009	CFR Timișoara	16	(7)
2009–2010	Srem	14	(7)
2010–2011	Mladi Radnik	24	(11)
2011	Srem	13	(5)
2012	Radnički Kragujevac	9	(1)
2012–2014	Smederevo	28	(10)
2015	Radnički Niš	0	(0)
Total		270	(108)
- * Club domestic league appearances and goals as of 10:09, 18 June 2014 (UTC)

Milan Vukašinović (Serbian Cyrillic: Милан Вукашиновић; born 31 May 1982) is a Serbian retired football forward who primarily played for clubs in the second tier of Serbia's football pyramid.

== Career ==
Vukašinović led Mladi Radnik in scoring during the 2010–11 season with 11 goals.
