= Božidar Jelovac =

Serbian footballer

Personal information
- Full name: Božidar Jelovac
- Date of birth: 31 July 1987 (age 39)
- Place of birth: Belgrade, Serbia
- Height: 1.90 m (6 ft 3 in)
- Position: Forward

College career
Years	Team	Apps	(Gls)
2007–2010	Albany Great Danes	35	(12)

Senior career*
Years	Team	Apps	(Gls)
2005–2006	Radnički Beograd	14	(3)
2007	Bežanija	5	(0)
2011	Dynamo České Budějovice	5	(0)
2012	Smederevo	5	(0)
2012	Vermont Voltage	25	(12)
2012–2023	Utica City FC (indoor)	210	(110)
2013–2015	GBFC Thunder	14	(16)
2017	Syracuse FC	3	(0)

International career
- Serbia & Montenegro U-17
- Serbia & Montenegro U-19

Managerial career
- 2021–2023: Cayuga Spartans
- * Club domestic league appearances and goals as of 22 November2024

Božidar Jelovac (Serbian Cyrillic: Божидар Јеловац; born 31 July 1987 in Karlovac) is a Serbian former professional football forward. Jelovac had also previously played for the GBFC Thunder.

In September 2021, Jelovac renewed his contract with Utica City.

In September 2023, Jelovac retired from professional soccer. He ended his career as one of the top players for Utica City in the Major Arena Soccer League, having played with the club for ten seasons.

== Coaching ==
In October 2021, Jelovac was named head coach of the Cayuga Community College Spartans men's team.
