= Nikola Simić (footballer, born 1981) =

Serbian footballer

Nikola Simić Никола Симић
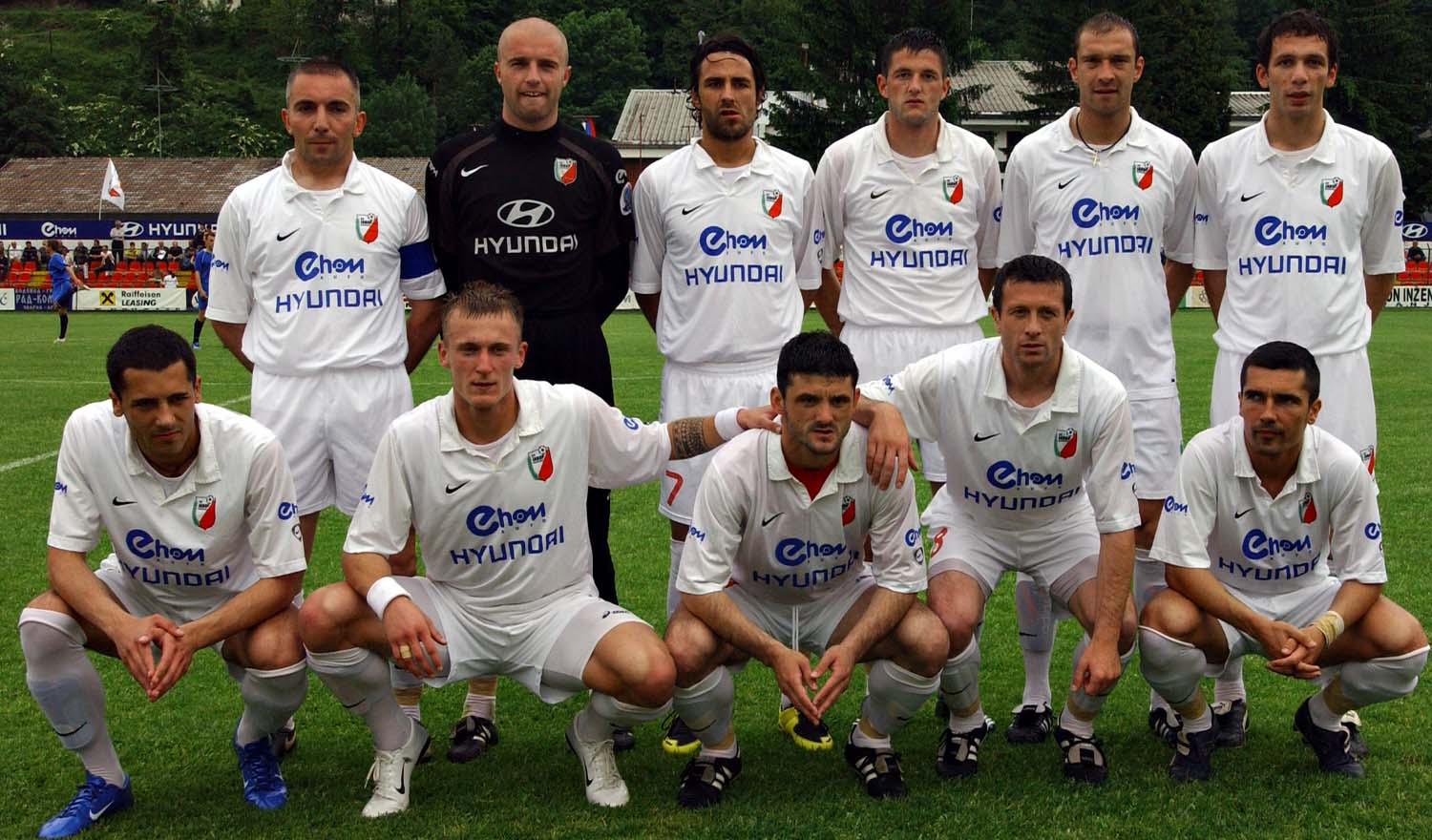
- Simić with Javor Ivanjica in 2008

Personal information
- Full name: Nikola Simić
- Date of birth: 30 July 1981 (age 45)
- Place of birth: Valjevo, SFR Yugoslavia
- Height: 1.86 m (6 ft 1 in)
- Position: Attacking midfielder

Youth career
- Budućnost Valjevo

Senior career*
Years	Team	Apps	(Gls)
2001	OFK Beograd	0	(0)
2002	Kolubara	13	(2)
2002	Radnički Kragujevac	17	(2)
2003–2004	Javor Ivanjica	56	(7)
2005	Egaleo	8	(0)
2006	Javor Ivanjica	10	(1)
2006–2007	Borac Čačak	36	(4)
2008–2009	Javor Ivanjica	48	(13)
2009–2011	OFK Beograd	50	(8)
2011	Hapoel Acre	2	(0)
2011–2012	Radnički Kragujevac	10	(0)
2012–2013	Čelik Nikšić	26	(1)
2013–2015	Čelik Zenica	49	(3)
2015	Zemun	8	(0)
Total		333	(41)
- * Club domestic league appearances and goals as of 16 January 2019

Nikola Simić (Serbian Cyrillic: Никола Симић; born 30 July 1981) is a Serbian retired footballer who plays as an attacking midfielder.

== Career ==
While playing for Javor Ivanjica, Simić was the fourth-highest scorer in the 2008–09 Serbian SuperLiga with 12 goals. He subsequently signed for OFK Beograd in the summer of 2009. Over the next two seasons with the Romantičari, Simić made 50 appearances and scored eight goals in the top flight.

In July 2011, Simić moved to Israeli Premier League club Hapoel Acre. He made just two league appearances for the side, before returning to his country and signing with newly promoted Serbian SuperLiga club Radnički Kragujevac in September 2011.

== Honours ==
Javor Ivanjica

- Serbian First League: 2007–08
