= Nikola Lekić =

Serbian footballer

Personal information
- Full name: Nikola Lekić
- Date of birth: 28 August 1990 (age 36)
- Place of birth: Belgrade, SFR Yugoslavia
- Height: 1.92 m (6 ft 4 in)
- Position: Attacking midfielder

Senior career*
Years	Team	Apps	(Gls)
2007	Dorćol	4	(0)
2007–2009	Dinamo București		
2009–2010	Teleoptik	3	(0)
2010–2012	Smederevo	3	(0)
2011	→ Mladi Radnik (loan)	3	(1)
2012	→ BPI Slavija (loan)	12	(0)
2012	PKB Padinska Skela	13	(3)
2013	Proleter Novi Sad	15	(3)
2013	Voždovac	6	(0)
2014	Proleter Novi Sad	10	(0)
2014–2015	Sloboda Užice	30	(5)
2015–2016	Bežanija	19	(2)
2016	Dorćol	14	(3)
2017	Bežanija	13	(2)
2018	Smederevo		
2018-2019	Zvezdara		
- * Club domestic league appearances and goals as of 16 June 2018

Nikola Lekić (Serbian Cyrillic: Никола Лекић; born 28 August 1990) is a Serbian footballer. He plays as a forward for his team.
