= Miloš Živković (footballer, born December 1984) =

Serbian footballer (born 1984)

Personal information
- Date of birth: 1 December 1984 (age 41)
- Place of birth: Niš, SFR Yugoslavia
- Height: 1.92 m (6 ft 4 in)
- Position: Centre-back

Youth career
- Radnički Niš

Senior career*
Years	Team	Apps	(Gls)
2002–2006	Radnički Niš	1	(0)
2004–2006	→ Železničar Niš (loan)		
2007–2008	Gomel	20	(0)
2009–2010	Sinđelić Niš		
2010	→ Novi Pazar (loan)	12	(1)
2010	Jagodina	1	(0)
2011	Metalac Gornji Milanovac	7	(0)
2012	Rabotnički	14	(2)
2012–2013	Radnički Niš	32	(1)
2014	Botoșani	1	(0)
2014	Novi Pazar	6	(0)
2015	Víkingur Reykjavik	17	(0)
2015–2017	Radnički Niš	20	(0)
2017–2018	OFK Bačka	19	(0)
2019	Bečej	7	(0)
- * Club domestic league appearances and goals

Miloš Živković (Serbian Cyrillic: Милош Живковић; born 1 December 1984) is a Serbian retired footballer who played as a centre-back.

== Career ==
Živković went through all selections Radnički Niš and patiently waited for the opportunity to play in the first team. In 2004, Miloš was loaned to Železničar for two years, then played for Belarusian club Gomel before moving to Sinđelić Niš, Novi Pazar, Jagodina, Metalac and Rabotnički. After all of that, he returned to his home club.

In summer 2017, Živković signed with OFK Bačka.
