= 2011–12 Serbian SuperLiga =

6th season of Serbian SuperLiga

Jelen SuperLiga
- Season: 2011–12
- Champions: Partizan; 5th SuperLiga title 24th domestic title
- Relegated: Metalac; Borac
- Champions League: Partizan
- Europa League: Red Star; Vojvodina; Jagodina
- Matches: 240
- Goals: 527 (2.2 per match)
- Top goalscorer: Darko Spalević (19 goals)
- Biggest home win: Partizan 5–0 Novi Pazar; Red Star 5–0 Metalac
- Biggest away win: Metalac 0–5 Red Star
- Highest scoring: Javor Ivanjica 2–4 Radnički; Partizan 5–1 Borac; Radnički 4–2 Rad; Spartak 5–1 Vojvodina; Sloboda 4–2 Hajduk
- Highest attendance: 45,355; Red Star–Partizan
- Lowest attendance: 0 Red Star–Vojvodina
- Average attendance: 4,008

The 2011–12 Serbian SuperLiga (known as the Jelen SuperLiga for sponsorship reasons) was the sixth season of the Serbian SuperLiga, the top football league of Serbia. The defending champions were Partizan, after having won their fourth Serbian Superliga title in a row at the conclusion of the previous season.

Partizan successfully defended their title after a 4–0 victory at Borac Čačak with three games left to play. It was their fifth consecutive Serbian title and their 24th domestic championship.

== Teams ==
Inđija and Čukarički were relegated to the 2011–12 Serbian First League after the 2010–11 season for finishing in 15th and 16th place, respectively. Čukarički completed a four-year tenure in the league, while Inđija had to immediately return to the First League.

The relegated teams were replaced by 2010–11 First League runners-up Radnički 1923 and third placed Novi Pazar. Radnički will be returning to the top tier for the first time since the season 2001–02. Novi Pazar was granted promotion after 2010–11 First League champions BASK withdrew from the SuperLiga. This will be their first season in top-tier competition.

=== Stadiums and locations ===
Location of teams in the 2011–12 Serbian SuperLiga

All figures for stadiums include seating capacity only, as many stadiums in Serbia have stands without chairs which would otherwise be the actual number of people able to be seated.

Team	City	Stadium	Capacity
Borac	Čačak	Čačak Stadium	8,000
BSK Borča	Belgrade	Stadion Borča	3,000
FK Hajduk	Kula	Stadion Hajduk	5,973
Jagodina	Jagodina	Stadion FK Jagodina	15,000
Javor	Ivanjica	Javor Stadium	10,000
Metalac	Gornji Milanovac	Mladost Stadium (Lučani)	8,000
Novi Pazar	Novi Pazar	Novi Pazar City Stadium	9,000
OFK Beograd	Belgrade	Omladinski Stadium	10,600
Partizan	Belgrade	Partizan Stadium	32,710
Rad	Belgrade	Stadion FK Obilić	4,508
Radnički 1923	Kragujevac	Čika Dača Stadium	15,100
Red Star	Belgrade	Stadion Crvene Zvezde	51,328
Sloboda	Užice	Užice City Stadium	5,979
Smederevo	Smederevo	Smederevo City Stadium	16,656
Spartak	Subotica	Subotica City Stadium	13,000
Vojvodina	Novi Sad	Karađorđe Stadium	12,303

=== Personnel and kits ===
Note: Flags indicate national team as has been defined under FIFA eligibility rules. Players and Managers may hold more than one non-FIFA nationality.

Team	Head coach	Captain	Kit manufacturer	Shirt sponsor
Borac	(Serbia) Ljubiša Dmitrović	(Serbia) Mario Maslać	NAAI	Skoda Auto
BSK Borča	(Serbia) Goran Milojević	(Serbia) Aleksandar Radunović	hummel	ĐAK
Hajduk Kula	(Serbia) Tomislav Sivić	(Serbia) Milan Bubalo	Joma	—
Jagodina	(Bosnia and Herzegovina) Simo Krunić	(Serbia) Miloš Stojanović	Nike	—
Javor Ivanjica	(Serbia) Aleksandar Janjić	(Serbia) Filip Stanisavljević	Jako	ALCEA
Metalac	(Serbia) Jovica Škoro	(Serbia) Nenad Živanović	Nike	Metalac
Novi Pazar	(Serbia) Dragoljub Bekvalac	(Serbia) Irfan Vušljanin	Nike	Conto Bene
OFK Beograd	(Serbia) Branko Babić	(Montenegro) Ivan Kecojević	Jako	Arena Sport
Partizan	(Israel) Avram Grant	(Serbia) Saša Ilić	adidas	—
Rad	(Serbia) Marko Nikolić	(Serbia) Tomislav Pajović	Patrick	—
Radnički 1923	(Serbia) Slavenko Kuzeljević	(Serbia) Željko Milošević	Joma	—
Red Star	(Croatia) Robert Prosinečki	(Serbia) Nikola Mikić	Nike	Gazprom
Sloboda Užice	(Serbia) Ljubiša Stamenković	(Serbia) Aleksandar Pejović	Jako	Point Group
Smederevo	(Serbia) Dragan Đorđević	(Serbia) Slaviša Stojanović	Nike	U.S. Steel
Spartak Zlatibor Voda	(Serbia) Zoran Milinković	(Serbia) Vladimir Torbica	Nike	Zlatibor Voda
Vojvodina	(Bulgaria) Zlatomir Zagorčić	(Serbia) Miroslav Vulićević	Joma	Aleksandar Gradnja

Nike is the official ball supplier for Serbian SuperLiga.

== League table ==
Pos	Team	Pld	W	D	L	GF	GA	GD	Pts	Qualification or relegation
1	Partizan (C)	30	26	2	2	67	12	+55	80	Qualification for Champions League second qualifying round
2	Red Star Belgrade	30	21	5	4	57	18	+39	68	Qualification for Europa League second qualifying round (Note: Red Star as 2011–12 Serbian Cup winners qualified for the second qualifying round of the UEFA Europa League. Since they finished second in the league, the third-placed team also qualified for the Europa League second qualifying round, and the fourth-placed team qualified for the Europa League first qualifying round.)
3	Vojvodina	30	14	10	6	44	26	+18	52	Qualification for Europa League second qualifying round
4	Jagodina	30	14	9	7	34	20	+14	51 (Note: Head-to-head points: Jagodina: 4 pts, Sloboda Užice: 1 pts.)	Qualification for Europa League first qualifying round
5	Sloboda Užice	30	15	6	9	42	35	+7	51	
6	Radnički 1923	30	11	14	5	38	27	+11	47	
7	Spartak Zlatibor Voda	30	11	10	9	31	31	0	43	
8	OFK Beograd	30	12	4	14	34	36	−2	40	
9	Javor Ivanjica	30	11	6	13	28	32	−4	39	
10	Rad	30	10	7	13	33	31	+2	37	
11	Hajduk Kula	30	9	6	15	28	44	−16	33	
12	BSK Borča	30	7	9	14	18	39	−21	30	
13	Smederevo	30	9	2	19	22	42	−20	29	
14	Novi Pazar	30	6	10	14	21	41	−20	28	
15	Borac Čačak (R)	30	4	7	19	16	45	−29	19	Relegation to Serbian First League
16	Metalac G.M. (R)	30	2	9	19	14	48	−34	15	Relegation to Serbian First League

Source: SuperLiga
Rules for classification: 1) points; 2) head-to-head points; 3) head-to-head goal difference; 4) head-to-head goals scored; 5) goal difference; 6) number of goals scored.
(C) Champions; (R) Relegated

== Results ==
Home \ Away	BOR	BSK	HAJ	JAG	JAV	MET	NPZ	OFK	PAR	RAD	RDK	RSB	SUŽ	SME	SZV	VOJ
Borac Čačak		0–2	0–0	0–0	1–0	0–0	0–2	0–2	0–4	0–0	3–1	0–3	1–2	0–1	0–1	0–2
BSK Borča	0–0		0–0	0–4	1–1	0–0	2–2	1–0	0–1	1–0	0–0	1–4	0–2	0–1	2–0	0–4
Hajduk Kula	2–1	3–0		0–2	1–4	0–0	1–0	1–2	0–2	1–0	0–0	0–1	1–2	3–1	3–1	0–1
Jagodina	0–0	2–0	0–1		1–0	0–2	1–0	2–0	0–1	1–1	1–0	1–3	1–1	3–0	3–0	1–1
Javor Ivanjica	0–2	2–0	2–1	0–0		1–1	1–0	0–0	0–2	1–0	2–4	1–3	3–1	0–1	1–0	0–0
Metalac G.M.	3–2	1–2	1–3	0–1	1–2		1–1	0–1	0–3	0–1	0–1	0–5	0–1	0–1	0–0	0–3
Novi Pazar	0–0	1–1	2–1	0–0	1–0	1–1		2–1	1–1	0–3	0–0	0–0	4–0	1–0	0–2	1–2
OFK Beograd	2–0	0–1	2–3	2–0	2–3	2–0	3–0		1–2	2–1	1–3	1–1	0–1	1–0	2–3	1–0
Partizan	5–1	2–0	2–0	4–0	2–1	1–0	5–0	3–0		1–0	3–0	0–1	0–0	3–1	2–0	4–1
Rad	2–1	1–1	3–0	1–2	0–1	3–0	0–0	1–0	1–4		2–1	1–2	1–2	2–0	1–2	1–1
Radnički 1923	2–0	1–1	0–0	0–0	2–0	3–2	3–1	1–1	0–1	4–2		0–0	2–1	3–0	1–1	0–0
Red Star Belgrade	2–0	2–0	3–0	1–0	2–0	5–0	3–1	3–1	0–2	3–1	1–1		1–0	4–0	1–0	0–2
Sloboda Užice	2–1	0–1	4–2	1–2	1–0	4–1	3–0	1–2	2–1	0–2	2–2	1–1		2–1	2–0	2–2
Smederevo	0–1	2–1	3–0	1–2	0–1	1–0	2–0	0–1	0–2	0–0	1–2	0–1	1–2		1–1	2–0
Spartak Zlatibor Voda	2–1	1–0	1–1	0–4	1–0	0–0	1–0	1–1	1–2	0–0	0–0	2–0	0–0	4–1		5–1
Vojvodina	3–1	2–0	4–0	0–0	1–1	0–0	3–0	2–0	1–2	0–2	1–1	2–1	2–0	2–0	1–1	

Source: SuperLiga
Legend: Blue = home team win; Yellow = draw; Red = away team win.

== Top goalscorers ==
Including matches played on 20 May 2012; Sources: Superliga official website, utakmica.rs, soccerway.com

Pos	Scorer	Team	Goals
1	(Serbia) Darko Spalević	Radnički 1923	19
2	(Serbia) Zvonimir Vukić	Partizan	13
3	(Serbia) Savo Kovačević	Sloboda Užice	12
4	(Brazil) Cadú	Red Star	11
4	(Senegal) Lamine Diarra	Partizan	11
4	(Serbia) Nemanja Tomić	Partizan	11

== Awards ==
=== Team of the season ===

Serbian SuperLiga Team of the Year

Position	Player	Team
GK	(Croatia) Marko Šimić	Jagodina
DR	(Serbia) Branko Pauljević	Hajduk Kula
DC	(Serbia) Nikola Maksimović	Red Star
DC	(Serbia) Duško Tošić	Red Star
DL	(Serbia) Filip Mladenović	Red Star
MR	(Serbia) Darko Lazović	Red Star
MC	(Serbia) Luka Milivojević	Red Star
MC	(Sierra Leone) Medo	Partizan
MC	(Serbia) Zvonimir Vukić	Partizan
ML	(Serbia) Stefan Babović	Partizan
FW	(Serbia) Darko Spalević	Radnički 1923
FW	(Serbia) Lazar Marković	Partizan

== Attendance ==
The 2011–12 season saw an average attendance by club:

	Club	Average	Highest	Lowest	Attendance (%)
1	Red Star	19,819	45,355	20*	38.11%
2	Partizan	7,111	21,453	20*	21.68%
3	Novi Pazar	6,636	12,000	20*	55.3%
4	Radnički 1923	5,736	15,000	20*	37.99%
5	Vojvodina	3,767	10,000	1000	23.93%
6	Sloboda	3,567	10,000	700	29.73%
7	Spartak	2,450	13,000	350	18.85%
8	Jagodina	2,267	7,000	1,000	22.67%
9	Hajduk	2,053	5,500	800	18.66%
10	Smederevo	1,747	8,000	400	10.46%
11	BSK Borča	1,399	3,900	80	34.98%
12	Borac	1,387	4,000	300	23.12%
13	Javor	1,013	4,000	300	28.14%
14	Rad	978	3,000	20*	30.56%
15	OFK Beograd	730	3,500	100	5.21%
16	Metalac	537	2,500	200	8.95%

* = due to previous crowd troubles, audience was not allowed on these games

== Champion squad ==
FK Partizan
Goalkeepers: Vladimir Stojković (25); Nikola Petrović (4); Radiša Ilić (2).

Defenders: (Bulgaria) Ivan Ivanov (30/4); Nemanja Rnić (25); Vladimir Volkov (21/1); Aleksandar Miljković (15); Nikola Aksentijević (14/1); (North Macedonia) Aleksandar Lazevski (8); Miloš Ostojić (6); Vojislav Stanković (4); (Brazil) Anderson Marques (1/1).

Midfielders: Stefan Babović (29/4); Nemanja Tomić (28/11); (Sierra Leone) Medo (26); Saša Ilić (25/4); Milan Smiljanić (23); Zvonimir Vukić (21/13); (Central African Republic) David Manga (9/1); Saša Marković (8/1); Nikola Ninković (4); Dejan Babić (3).

Forwards: Lazar Marković (26/6); (Senegal) Lamine Diarra (23/11); (Brazil) Eduardo (16/4); Marko Šćepović (9/4).

(league appearances and goals listed in brackets)

Managers: Aleksandar Stanojević; (Israel) Avram Grant.

Transferred out during the season: (Bosnia and Herzegovina) Vladimir Jovančić (9, to Seongnam Ilhwa Chunma); Aleksandar Davidov (1, to Hapoel Acre); Aleksandar Ranković (1, released).

== Transfers ==
For the list of transfers involving SuperLiga clubs during 2011–12 season, please see: List of Serbian football transfers summer 2011 and List of Serbian football transfers winter 2011–12.
