= FK Palić =

Association football club in Serbia

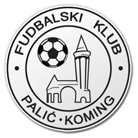
- Full name: Fudbalski Klub Palić
- Founded: 10 June 1954; 72 years ago
- Ground: Sportski centar Janko Pejanović, Palić
- Capacity: 1,500
- Manager: Ilija Dobrić
- League: Gradska liga Subotica
- 2024–25: Gradska liga Subotica, 6th
Home colours	Away colours

FK Palić (Serbian Cyrillic: ФК Палић) is a football club based in Palić, Serbia. As of the 2025-26 season, they compete in the 6th-tier Subotica City League (Gradska Liga).

== History ==
FK Palić was formed on June 10, 1954, by the initiative of former footballers Jožef Balaž, Deže Šefer, Vlada Đorđević, Janko Pejanović and Milorad Icić. During Yugoslav period its major achievements were the qualification for the Vojvodina League in 1977 and winning the Bačka League in the season 1983–84. Club presidents were Miloš Ćosić, Ilija Šakić, Janko Pejanović, Marko Krnjajski, Simo Vukša, Imre Biro, Petar Blagotić, Karlo Vitez, Nikola Radulović, Veso Avdalović and Petar Đorđević.

=== Recent league history ===
Season	Division	P	W	D	L	F	A	Pts	Pos
2020–21	6 - Gradska liga Subotica	20	5	2	13	45	61	17	10th
2021–22	6 - Gradska liga Subotica	22	12	4	6	46	34	40	4th
2022–23	6 - Gradska liga Subotica	22	3	2	17	27	71	11	11th
2023–24	6 - Gradska liga Subotica	20	0	0	20	14	123	0	11th
2024–25	6 - Gradska liga Subotica	22	8	7	7	42	33	31	6th

== Players ==
For the list of former and current players with Wikipedia article, please see: Category:FK Palić players.

== Coaches ==
Former coaches of FK Palić include Deže Demeter, Blaško Milunović, Ivan Bogešić, Ilija Vorgučin, Stipan Kopilović, Aleksandar Gaborović, Jožef Sabo Rac, Mihalj Bleskanj, Josip Zemko, Antun Čikić, Marinko Poljaković, Svetozar Mirolović, Miloš Zakić and Dejan Vrana.

== Stadium ==
Stadium SC Janko Pejanović

Janko Pejanović is a multi-use stadium in the town of Palić, near the city of Subotica, in Serbia. It is currently used mostly for football matches and has been the home ground of FK Palić since its foundation in 1931. The stadium holds 1,500 people. Along the main one, it has another auxiliary football pitch where, beside trainings, it is used for other sports as well.
