= 2013–14 Red Star Belgrade season =

Red Star Belgrade
2013–14 season
- President: Dragan Džajić
- Head coach: Slaviša Stojanović
- Stadium: Red Star Stadium
- SuperLiga: 1st
- Serbian Cup: Quarter-finals
- Europa League: Third qualifying round
- Top goalscorer: League: Dragan Mrđa (19); All: Dragan Mrđa (20)
- Highest home attendance: 48,347 vs OFK Beograd (25 May 2014)
- Lowest home attendance: 0 vs Sloboda (23 November 2013)
- Average home league attendance: 19,232
Home colours	Away colours	Third colours

This article shows player statistics and all results & fixtures (official and friendly) that the club have played (and will play) during the 2013–14 season. In season 2013–14 Red Star will be competing in Serbian SuperLiga, Serbian Cup and UEFA Europa League.

== Previous season positions ==
	Competition	Position 1
(Serbia)	Serbian SuperLiga	2nd
(Serbia)	Serbian Cup	Quarter finals
(European Union)	UEFA Europa League	Play-off round

== Club ==
=== Club management ===
Current management
- President: (Serbia) Dragan Džajić
- Vice-president: (Serbia) Nebojša Čović
- Vice-president: (Serbia) Slaviša Kokeza
- Vice-president: (Serbia) Ivica Tončev
- Sport director: (Serbia) Zoran Stojadinović
- General secretary: (Serbia) Miodrag Zečević
- Deputy general secretary: (Serbia) Stefan Pantović
- Marketing director: (Serbia) Goran Broćić

=== Coaching staff ===
Position	Staff
Manager	(Slovenia) Slaviša Stojanović
1 Assistant manager	(Slovenia) Miloš Kostić
2 Assistant manager	(Serbia) Bratislav Živković
Coach	(Serbia) Ivica Momčilović
Goalkeeping coach	(Serbia) Srđan Maksimović
Fitness coach	(Serbia) Mihajlo Radulović
Fitness coach	(Serbia) Vladimir Čepzanović
Secretary of the coaching staff	(Serbia) Goran Negić
Doctor	(Serbia) Dr. Milisav Popić
Physiotherapist	(Serbia) Mišo Bukumirović
Physiotherapist	(Serbia) Goran Zuvić
Physiotherapist	(Serbia) Ivan Popović
Team manager	(Serbia) Mirko Abramović
Kit manager	(Serbia) Stojan Milanović
Kit manager	(Serbia) Dragan Milanović

=== Grounds ===
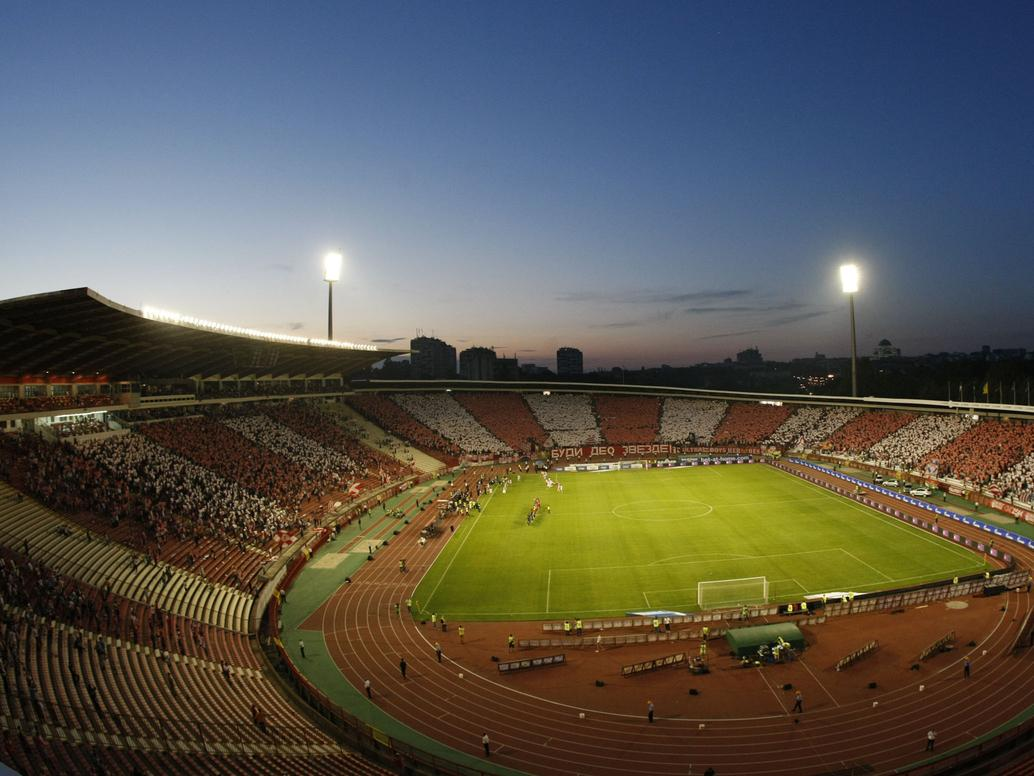
Red Star Stadium aka Marakana

Ground (capacity and dimensions)	Red Star Stadium (55,538 (seated) / 110 x 73 meters)
Training ground	Red Star Stadium auxiliary field

=== Kit ===
Supplier: (Germany) Puma
Sponsor(s): (Russia) Gazprom (main) (Serbia) Telekom Srbija (back) (Russia) G-Energy (shorts)

== Players ==
=== Current squad ===
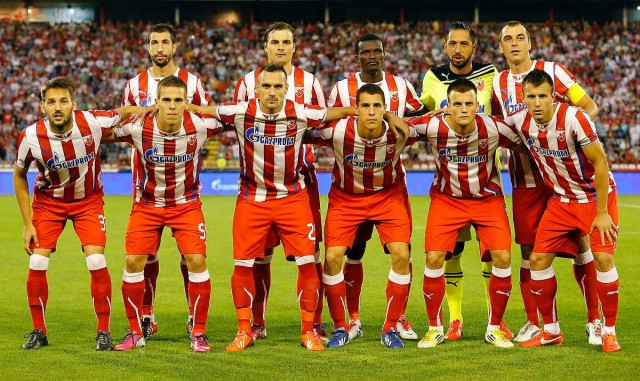
Red Star team, first game in season.

As of 1 September 2013

Note: Flags indicate national team as defined under FIFA eligibility rules; some limited exceptions apply. Players may hold more than one non-FIFA nationality.

No.	Pos.	Nation	Player
1	GK	MNE	Boban Bajković
2	DF	SRB	Marko Petković
3	DF	SRB	Ljubo Nenadić
4	DF	SRB	Darko Lazić
5	DF	SRB	Nikola Mijailović
6	DF	SRB	Jovan Krneta
7	FW	SRB	Đorđe Rakić
8	MF	SRB	Darko Lazović
9	FW	NGR	Abiola Dauda
10	MF	SRB	Nenad Milijaš (captain)
11	MF	SLO	Nejc Pečnik
14	FW	SRB	Nikola Đorđević
15	MF	SRB	Nemanja Ahčin
16	FW	SRB	Luka Milunović
17	FW	MNE	Filip Kasalica
19	DF	SRB	Novak Martinović
20	DF	PER	Miguel Araujo

No.	Pos.	Nation	Player
21	MF	SRB	Marko Mirić
22	GK	SRB	Miloš Vesić
23	MF	SRB	Petar Đuričković
25	DF	SRB	Filip Mladenović
26	MF	SRB	Goran Gogić
27	FW	SRB	Stefan Mihajlović
28	MF	SRB	Vukan Savićević
29	DF	MNE	Marko Vešović
30	DF	LBR	Omega Roberts
31	GK	SRB	Marko Trkulja
33	MF	SRB	Miloš Ninković
34	DF	SRB	Stevan Luković
45	MF	SRB	Milan Jokić
55	MF	SRB	Aleksandar Kovačević
84	FW	SRB	Dragan Mrđa
95	GK	SRB	Predrag Rajković
99	FW	NGR	Ifeanyi Onyilo

=== Foreign players ===
- (Nigeria) Abiola Dauda
- (Nigeria) Ifeanyi Onyilo
- (Slovenia) Nejc Pečnik
- (Liberia) Omega Roberts
- (Peru) Miguel Araujo

=== Players with dual citizenship ===
- (Nigeria) (Sweden) Abiola Dauda
- (Montenegro) (Serbia) Boban Bajković
- (Montenegro) (Serbia) Filip Kasalica
- (Montenegro) (Serbia) Marko Vešović
- (Serbia) (Montenegro) Vukan Savićević

=== Transfers ===
==== In ====
#	Position	Player	Transferred from	Fee	Date	Team	Source
7	FW	(Serbia) Đorđe Rakić	(Qatar) Al-Arabi	Free transfer	17 June 2013	First-team	
5	LB	(Serbia) Nikola Mijailović	(Russia) Amkar	Free transfer	27 June 2013	First-team	
11	LW/RW	(Slovenia) Nejc Pečnik	(England) Sheffield Wednesday	Free transfer (~ €150,000)	1 July 2013	First-team	
33	AM	(Serbia) Miloš Ninković	(Ukraine) Dynamo Kyiv	Free transfer (~ €120,000)	4 July 2013	First-team	
55	DM	(Serbia) Aleksandar Kovačević	(Serbia) Spartak ZV	Undisclosed (~ €85,000 + 40% of future sold)	5 July 2013	First team	
20	CB	(Peru) Miguel Araujo	(Peru) Sport Huancayo	Undisclosed (~ €260,000)	26 July 2013	First-team	
30	CB	(Liberia) Omega Roberts	(Serbia) Smederevo	Free transfer	26 July 2013	First-team	
19	CB	(Serbia) Novak Martinović	(China) Wuhan Zall	Free transfer	26 July 2013	First-team	
99	FW	(Nigeria) Ifeanyi Onyilo	(Serbia) Javor	Undisclosed (~ €450,000 + 30% of future sold)	13 August 2013	First-team	
84	FW	(Serbia) Dragan Mrđa	(Switzerland) Sion	Free transfer	14 August 2013	First-team	
95	GK	(Serbia) Predrag Rajković	(Serbia) Jagodina	Undisclosed (~ €140,000 + 30% of future sold)	28 August 2013	First-team	
26	DM	(Serbia) Goran Gogić	(Serbia) Jagodina	Undisclosed (~ €60,000)	28 August 2013	First-team	
2	DR	(Serbia) Marko Petković	(Serbia) OFK Beograd	Undisclosed (~ €200,000 + 20% of future sold)	29 August 2013	First-team	

Total spending: ▼ Undisclosed (~ €1,500,000)

===== Loan return and promoted =====
#	Position	Player	Moving from	Type	Date	Team	Source
3	LB	(Serbia) Ljubo Nenadić	(Serbia) Novi Pazar	Loan return	17 June 2013	First team	
21	RW	(Serbia) Marko Mirić	(Serbia) Radnički 1923	Loan return	17 June 2013	First team	
23	AM/LW	(Serbia) Petar Đuričković	(Serbia) Radnički 1923	Loan return	17 June 2013	First team	
34	RB	(Serbia) Stevan Luković	(Serbia) Leotar	Loan return	17 June 2013	First team	
4	CB/RB	(Serbia) Darko Lazić	(Serbia) Youth system	Promoted	17 June 2013	First team	
14	FW	(Serbia) Nikola Đorđević	(Serbia) Youth system	Promoted	17 June 2013	First team	
15	CM	(Serbia) Nemanja Ahčin	(Serbia) Youth system	Promoted	17 June 2013	First team	
31	GK	(Serbia) Marko Trkulja	(Serbia) Youth system	Promoted	17 June 2013	First team	
44	CB	(Serbia) Marko Marinković	(Serbia) Youth system	Promoted	17 June 2013	First team	

==== Out ====
#	Position	Player	Transferred to	Fee	Date	Team	Source
15	CB	(Montenegro) Milan Jovanović	(Bulgaria) Lokomotiv Sofia	Free transfer (Released)	17 April 2013	First team	
7	CM	(Serbia) Miloš Dimitrijević	(Australia) Sydney FC	Free transfer (Released)	18 April 2013	First team	
14	RB/CB	(Serbia) Nikola Mikić	(Turkey) Manisaspor	Free transfer (Released)	24 May 2013	First team	
3	LB/CB	(Serbia) Nikola Petković	(Australia) Sydney FC	Free transfer (Released)	24 May 2013	First team	
11	AM	(Brazil) Cadu	(Moldova) Sheriff	Free transfer (Released)	24 May 2013	First team	
20	DM	(Honduras) Luis Garrido	(Honduras) Olimpia	Loan return	24 May 2013	First team	
13	CB	(Serbia) Nikola Maksimović	(Cyprus) Apollon Limassol	Loan return	24 May 2013	First team	
5	CB	(Serbia) Uroš Spajić	(France) Toulouse FC	Undisclosed (~ €1,500,000)	29 May 2013	First team	
4	DM	(Serbia) Srđan Mijailović	(Turkey) Kayserispor	Free transfer (~ €500,000)	20 June 2013	First team	
2	RB/CB	(Serbia) Aleksandar Pantić	(Spain) Villarreal CF	Free transfer (~ €30,000)	20 June 2013	First team	
	LW	(Serbia) Slavoljub Srnić	(Serbia) Čukarički	Undisclosed (~ €30,000) was on loan, now signed	20 June 2013	First team	
	DM	(Serbia) Dragoljub Srnić	(Serbia) Čukarički	Undisclosed (~ ) was on loan, now signed	20 June 2013	First team	
	RB	(Serbia) Filip Stojković	(Serbia) Čukarički	Undisclosed (~ ) was on loan, now signed	20 June 2013	First team	
23	LB	(Montenegro) Stevan Reljić	(North Macedonia) Vardar	Free transfer (Released)	3 July 2013	First team	
91	FW	(Serbia) Ognjen Mudrinski	(Germany) Greuther Fürth	Undisclosed (~ €650,000)	8 July 2013	First team	
19	CM	(Serbia) Luka Milivojević	(Belgium) R.S.C. Anderlecht	Undisclosed (~ €3,000,000), 25% go to Rad	26 July 2013	First team	
77	FW	(Ghana) Nathaniel Asamoah	(Ghana) Medeama SC	Free transfer (Released)	8 August 2013	First team	

Total income: ▲ Undisclosed (~ €4,960,000)

===== Loan out =====
#	Position	Player	Loaned to	Date	Loan expires	Team	Source
32	GK	(Serbia) Aleksandar Kirovski	(Serbia) Zemun	15 July 2013	End of the season	First team	
44	CB	(Serbia) Marko Marinković	(Serbia) Smederevo	8 August 2013	End of the season	First team	
18	FW	(Serbia) Ognjen Ožegović	(Serbia) Voždovac	19 August 2013	End of the season	First team	
2	RB	(Serbia) Nikola Karaklajić	(Serbia) Voždovac	19 August 2013	End of the season	First team	

==== Overall transfer activity ====
===== Spending =====
▼ Undisclosed (~ €1,500,000)

===== Income =====
▲ Undisclosed (~ €4,960,000)

===== Net expenditure =====
▲ Undisclosed (~ €3,460,000)

== Non-competitive ==
=== Preseason ===
26 June 2013 Friendly	Krka (Slovenia)	0–1	(Serbia) Red Star	Novo Mesto, Slovenia
		Novo Mesto	Stefan Mihajlović 64'	Stadium: Portoval; Attendance: 200

29 June 2013 Friendly	Domžale (Slovenia)	0–2	(Serbia) Red Star	Domžale, Slovenia
			Stefan Mihajlović 3'; Filip Kasalica 78'	Stadium: Sports Park; Attendance: 1000

2 July 2013 Friendly	Illichivets (Ukraine)	2–0	(Serbia) Red Star	Krško, Slovenia
	Dmytro Mishnyev 52'; David Targamadze 53'			Stadium: Matija Gubac; Attendance: 300

=== Uhrencup ===
6 July 2013	Grasshopper Club Zürich (Switzerland)	0–1	(Serbia) Red Star	Grenchen, Switzerland
19:30 CEST		(Report) (in German)	30' Filip Kasalica	Stadium: Stadion Brühl; Attendance: 4,326; Referee: Adrien Jaccottet

8 July 2013	Basel (Switzerland)	2–1	(Serbia) Red Star	Grenchen, Switzerland
19:30 CEST	79' Valentin Stocker; 84' Raúl Bobadilla		39' Filip Mladenović	Stadium: Stadion Brühl; Attendance: 4,563; Referee: Fedayi San

== Competitions ==
=== Overall ===
	Competition	Position
(European Union)	UEFA Europa League	Third qualifying round
(Serbia)	Serbian Cup	Quarter Final
(Serbia)	Serbian SuperLiga	1st

=== UEFA Europa League ===
==== Second qualifying round ====
18 July 2013 QR2	Red Star (Serbia)	2–0	(Iceland) ÍBV	Belgrade, Serbia
20:30	Pečnik 12'; Mijailović 76'	Report		Stadium: Red Star Stadium, Belgrade; Attendance: 32,886; Referee: Luca Banti (Italy)

25 July 2013 QR2	ÍBV (Iceland)	0–0	(Serbia) Red Star	Vestmannaeyjar, Iceland
20:30		Report		Stadium: Hásteinsvöllur, Vestmannaeyjar; Attendance: 900; Referee: István Kovács (Romania)

==== Third qualifying round ====
1 August 2013 QR3	Chornomorets Odesa (Ukraine)	3-1	(Serbia) Red Star	Chornomorets Stadium, Odesa
18:15	Riera 32'; Dja Djédjé 38'; Antonov 78' (pen.)	Report	Savićević 59'	Attendance: 28,862; Referee: Kenn Hansen (Denmark)

8 August 2013 QR3	Red Star (Serbia)	0-0	(Ukraine) Chornomorets Odesa	Red Star Stadium, Belgrade
20:30		Report		Attendance: 39,730; Referee: Artur Soares (Portugal)

=== Serbian Cup ===
Red Star will participate in the 8th Serbian Cup starting in First Round.

==== Matches ====
25 September 2013 1/16	Proleter	0–3	Red Star	Novi Sad
15:00 CEST			Pečnik 44'; Dauda 60', 84'	Stadium: Karađorđe Stadium; Attendance: 3,000; Referee: Danilo Grujić

30 October 2013 1/8	Red Star	3–0	Radnički 1923	Belgrade
19:00 CET	Milijaš 8'; Mijailović 55'; Krneta 88'			Stadium: Marakana; Attendance: 4,661; Referee: Ninoslav Spasić

4 December 2013 1/4	Red Star	1–3	Vojvodina	Belgrade
17:00 CET	Mrđa 73'		Kaluđerović 10'; Alivodić 58'; Škuletić 71'	Stadium: Marakana; Attendance: 7,120; Referee: Boško Jovanetić

=== Serbian SuperLiga ===
The 2013–14 season is Red Star's 8th season in Serbian SuperLiga.

==== Matches ====
11 August 2013 1	Javor	4–2	Red Star	Ivanjica
18:00 CEST	Milović 5'; Ifeanyi 12'; Đorđević 81'; Dražić 85'		Kasalica 21'; Pečnik 27'; Martinović (yellow card) 68' (red card)	Stadium: Stadion Ivanjica; Attendance: 2,500; Referee: Vlado Glođović

17 August 2013 2	Red Star	2–1	Jagodina	Belgrade
18:00 CEST	Ninković 31', 45'		Gogić 82'	Stadium: Marakana; Attendance: 11,800; Referee: Milorad Mažić

24 August 2013 3	Napredak	0–1	Red Star	Kruševac
19:00 CEST			Pečnik 20'	Stadium: Stadion Mladosti; Attendance: 13,500; Referee: Boško Jovanetić

31 August 2013 4	Radnički 1923	0–2	Red Star	Kragujevac
17:00 CEST			Kasalica 16'; Dauda 88'	Stadium: Čika Dača; Attendance: 7,000; Referee: Miodrag Gogić

15 September 2013 5	Red Star	2–2	Donji Srem	Belgrade
19:00 CEST	Dauda 9'; Pečnik 54'		Marčeta 76'; Lakić-Pešić (yellow card) 81' (red card); Aškovski 90'	Stadium: Marakana; Attendance: 37,620; Referee: Darko Bogdanović

22 September 2013 6	Voždovac	1–0	Red Star	Belgrade
15:00 CEST	Marušić 26'			Stadium: Voždovac Stadium; Attendance: 3,000; Referee: Milenko Vukаdinović

29 September 2013 7	Red Star	5–0	Spartak	Belgrade
19:00 CEST	Mrđa 11', 18', 21'; Dauda 79'; Milijaš 86'			Stadium: Marakana; Attendance: 5,818; Referee: Nenad Ćokić

6 October 2013 8	Čukarički	2–0	Red Star	Belgrade
19:00 CEST	N. Stojiljković 1', S. Srnić 76'			Stadium: Stadion Čukarički; Attendance: 4,000; Referee: Novica Anđelovski

19 October 2013 9	Red Star	5–1	Novi Pazar	Belgrade
18:00 CEST	Milijaš 8'; Dauda 19', 45+2'; Mrđa 54', 72'		Jelić 76'	Stadium: Marakana; Attendance: 6,549; Referee: Danilo Grujić

26 October 2013 10	Radnički Niš	1–1	Red Star	Niš
19:00 CEST	Hadžibulić 8'		Dauda 45'	Stadium: Čair; Attendance: 15,000; Referee: Miodrag Gogić

2 November 2013 11	Red Star	1–0	Partizan	Belgrade
18:00 CET	Obradović 19' (o.g.); Lazić (red card) 90+7'			Stadium: Marakana; Attendance: 40,034; Referee: Milorad Mažić

10 November 2013 12	Rad	0–1	Red Star	Belgrade
13:00 CET			Milijaš 10'; Mrđa (penalty missed)	Stadium: Obilić Stadium; Attendance: 2,500; Referee: Milenko Vukadimović

23 November 2013 13	Red Star	4–1	Sloboda Užice	Belgrade
18:00 CET	Gogić 11'; Mrđa 40', 43', 62'		Galvao 8'	Stadium: Marakana; Attendance: 0 Referee: Danilo Grujić

30 November 2013 14	OFK Beograd	1–2	Red Star	Belgrade
13:00 CET	Čavrić 55'		Mrđa, 43'; Ninković 80' (pen.)	Stadium: Karaburma; Attendance: 2,300; Referee: Milan Jeremić

7 December 2013 15	Red Star	2–1	Vojvodina	Belgrade
18:00 CET	Dauda 49'; Milijaš (penalty missed); Mrđa 90+3'		Poletanović 38'; Nastić (yellow card) 88' (red card)	Stadium: Marakana; Attendance: 7,230; Referee: Ninoslav Spasić

23 February 2014 16	Red Star	2-1	Javor	Belgrade
18:00 CET	Dauda 32'; Pečnik 45'		Zlatković 67'	Stadium: Marakana; Attendance: 23,420; Referee: Dejan Santrač

1 March 2014 17	Jagodina	0-2	Red Star	Jagodina
14:00 CET			Mrđa 4'; Milijaš 45'	Stadium: Jagodina City Stadium; Attendance: 14,000; Referee: Majo Vujović

8 March 2014 18	Red Star	4-1	Napredak	Belgrade
18:00 CET	Pavicević 45'; Dauda 72', 76'; Ninković 80' (pen.)		Dimitrov 15' (pen.)	Stadium: Marakana; Attendance: 22,640; Referee: Boško Jovanetić

15 March 2014 19	Red Star	1-0	Radnički 1923	Belgrade
18:00 CET	Ninković (penalty missed); Kasalica 75'			Stadium: Marakana; Attendance: 22,480; Referee: Miodrag Gogić

22 March 2014 20	Donji Srem	0-1	Red Star	Pećinci
15:00 CET			Pečnik 21'	Stadium: Karađorđe Stadium; Attendance: 10,000; Referee: Danilo Grujić

29 March 2014 21	Red Star	5-1	Voždovac	Belgrade
18:00 CET	Milijaš 17'; Dauda 29'; Mrđa 44', 62'		Sekulić 54'	Stadium: Marakana; Attendance: 16,250; Referee: Srđan Obradović

5 April 2014 22	Spartak	1-2	Red Star	Subotica
18:00 CEST	Šarac 78'		Mijailović 21'; Mrđa 74'	Stadium: Subotica City Stadium; Attendance: 4,000; Referee: Ninoslav Spasić

12 April 2014 23	Red Star	4-1	Čukarički	Belgrade
18:30 CEST	Lazović 3', 45', 49' (pen.); Mrđa 56'		Mandić 42'	Stadium: Marakana; Attendance: 17,380; Referee: Milenko Vukadimović

19 April 2014 24	Novi Pazar	0-1	Red Star	Novi Pazar
16:00 CEST			Milijaš 17'; Lazović (penalty missed)	Stadium: Novi Pazar City Stadium; Attendance: 6,000; Referee: Boško Jovanetić

22 April 2014 25	Red Star	2-0	Radnički Niš	Belgrade
19:00 CEST	Rakić 49'; Mrđa 74'			Stadium: Marakana; Attendance: 16,230; Referee: Dejan Santrač

26 April 2014 26	Partizan	2-1	Red Star	Belgrade
19:30 CEST	Drinčić 27'; Kojić 89'		Ninković (penalty missed); Mijailović (penalty missed); Mrđa 56'	Stadium: Partizan Stadium; Attendance: 30,000; Referee: Milorad Mažić

3 May 2014 27	Red Star	2-0	Rad	Belgrade
19:30 CEST	Milijaš 17' (pen.); Mrđa 48'			Stadium: Marakana; Attendance: 12,690; Referee: Dejan Filipović

10 May 2014 28	Sloboda Užice	0-2	Red Star	Užice
17:30 CEST			Milijaš 4'; Pečnik 29'	Stadium: Užice City Stadium; Attendance: 10,000; Referee: Danilo Grujić

25 May 2014 29	Red Star	4-2	OFK Beograd	Belgrade
17:00 CEST	Lazović 15'; Pečnik 40'; Mrđa 46'; Ninković 85'		Paločević 11'; Gajić 43'	Stadium: Marakana; Attendance: 48,347; Referee: Majo Vujović

28 May 2014 30	Vojvodina	3-3	Red Star	Novi Sad
17:00 CEST	Rakić 44', 62'; Jović 75'		Veselinović 48'; Puškarić 52'; Popara 63'	Stadium: Stadion Karađorđe; Attendance: 6,000; Referee: Srđan Obradović

==== Results and positions by round ====
Round	1	2	3	4	5	6	7	8	9	10	11	12	13	14	15	16	17	18	19	20	21	22	23	24	25	26	27	28	29	30
Ground	A	H	A	A	H	A	H	A	H	A	H	A	H	A	H	H	A	H	H	A	H	A	H	A	H	A	H	A	H	A
Result	L	W	W	W	D	L	W	L	W	D	W	W	W	W	W	W	W	W	W	W	W	W	W	W	W	L	W	W	W	D
Position	14	9	4	4	4	6	3	5	3	4	2	2	2	2	2	1	1	1	1	1	1	1	1	1	1	1	1	1	1	1

Updated to match(es) played on 28 May 2014. Source:
A = Away; H = Home; W = Win; D = Draw; L = Loss

==== League table ====
Pos	Team	Pld	W	D	L	GF	GA	GD	Pts	Qualification or relegation
1	Red Star Belgrade (C, D)	30	23	3	4	66	27	+39	72	Excluded from European competitions (Note: Red Star Belgrade, the champions of the 2013–14 Serbian SuperLiga, would have qualified for the Champions League second qualifying round, but was banned by UEFA for breaching UEFA Club Licensing and Financial Fair Play Regulations. As a result, the Partizan, the runners-up of the league, entered the Champions League instead of the Europa League second qualifying round and Jagodina, the third-placed team of the league, entered the Europa League second qualifying round instead of the first qualifying round, and the first qualifying round berth was given to Čukarički, the fifth-placed team of the league.)
2	Partizan (Q)	30	22	5	3	64	20	+44	71	Qualification for Champions League second qualifying round
3	Jagodina (Q)	30	13	9	8	40	30	+10	48	Qualification for Europa League second qualifying round (Note: Vojvodina won the 2013–14 Serbian Cup, therefore qualified for the second qualifying round of the 2014–15 UEFA Europa League)
4	Vojvodina (Q)	30	11	12	7	38	32	+6	45	Qualification for Europa League second qualifying round
5	Čukarički (Q)	30	12	8	10	30	31	−1	44	Qualification for Europa League first qualifying round

Source: Serbian SuperLiga
Rules for classification: 1) points; 2) head-to-head points; 3) head-to-head goal difference; 4) head-to-head goals scored; 5) goal difference; 6) number of goals scored.
(C) Champions; (D) Disqualified; (Q) Qualified for the phase indicated

== Statistics ==
=== Squad statistics ===
No.	Name	League		Cup		Europe		Total		Discipline	
No.	Name	Apps	Goals	Apps	Goals	Apps	Goals	Apps	Goals	Yellow card	Red card
Goalkeepers
1	(Montenegro) Boban Bajković	26	-22	1	-3	4	-3	20	-28	0	0
22	(Serbia) Miloš Vesić	0	0	2	0	0	0	2	0	0	0
31	(Serbia) Marko Trkulja	0	0	0	0	0	0	0	0	0	0
95	(Serbia) Predrag Rajković	0	0	0	0	0	0	0	0	0	0
Defenders
2	(Serbia) Marko Petković	4+3	0	1	0	0	0	8	0	1	0
3	(Serbia) Ljubo Nenadić	0	0	0	0	0	0	0	0	0	0
4	(Serbia) Darko Lazić	9	0	1	0	4	0	14	0	4	1
5	(Serbia) Nikola Mijailović	13+1	0	3	1	2	1	19	2	6	0
6	(Serbia) Jovan Krneta	9+2	0	2	1	3	0	16	1	3	0
19	(Serbia) Novak Martinović	6	0	1	0	1	0	9	0	4	1
20	(Peru) Miguel Araujo	4	0	1	0	0	0	4	0	1	0
25	(Serbia) Filip Mladenović	1+2	0	0+2	0	2+2	0	9	0	0	0
29	(Montenegro) Marko Vešović	12	0	2	0	4	0	18	0	5	0
30	(Liberia) Omega Roberts	2	0	1	0	0	0	3	0	0	0
34	(Serbia) Stevan Luković	0	0	0	0	0	0	0	0	0	0
Midfielders
8	(Serbia) Darko Lazović	0	0	0	0	0	0	0	0	0	0
10	(Serbia) Nenad Milijaš ^{(C)}	14	3	2+1	1	4	0	21	4	1	0
11	(Slovenia) Nejc Pečnik	14	3	2+1	1	4	1	21	5	5	0
15	(Serbia) Nemanja Ahčin	0	0	0	0	0	0	0	0	0	0
21	(Serbia) Marko Mirić	1+4	0	0+1	0	0+1	0	6	0	1	0
23	(Serbia) Petar Đuričković	0	0	0	0	0	0	0	0	0	0
26	(Serbia) Goran Gogić	6+4	1	3	0	0	0	13	1	1	0
28	(Serbia) Vukan Savićević	0+8	0	1+1	0	2+2	1	14	1	0	0
33	(Serbia) Miloš Ninković	14	4	2	0	4	0	20	4	1	0
45	(Serbia) Milan Jokić	0	0	0	0	0	0	0	0	0	0
55	(Serbia) Aleksandar Kovačević	10	0	0+1	0	4	0	15	0	3	0
Forwards
7	(Serbia) Đorđe Rakić	0	0	0	0	0	0	0	0	0	0
9	(Nigeria) Abiola Dauda	13+2	7	1+1	2	3+1	0	21	9	1	0
14	(Serbia) Nikola Đorđević	0	0	0	0	0	0	0	0	0	0
16	(Serbia) Luka Milunović	0+6	0	1	0	0+2	0	8	0	1	0
17	(Montenegro) Filip Kasalica	6+5	2	2	0	3+1	0	17	2	3	0
27	(Serbia) Stefan Mihajlović	0+1	0	1	0	0+2	0	4	0	3	1
84	(Serbia) Dragan Mrđa	9+4	10	1	1	0	0	14	11	3	0
99	(Nigeria) Ifeanyi Onyilo	2+2	0	1	0	0	0	5	0	0	0

=== Goalscorers ===
Includes all competitive matches. The list is sorted by shirt number when total goals are equal.

As of 28 May 2014

Rank	Pos	No.	Player	League	Cup	Europa League	Total
1	CF	84	(Serbia) Dragan Mrđa	19	1	0	20
2	CF	9	(Nigeria) Abiola Dauda	11	2	0	13
3	CM	10	(Serbia) Nenad Milijaš	8	1	0	9
3	LW	11	(Slovenia) Nejc Pečnik	7	1	1	9
5	RW	8	(Serbia) Darko Lazović	5	0	0	5
5	AM	33	(Serbia) Miloš Ninković	5	0	0	5
7	LB	5	(Serbia) Nikola Mijailović	1	1	1	3
7	RW	17	(Montenegro) Filip Kasalica	3	0	0	3
7	CF	7	(Serbia) Đorđe Rakić	3	0	0	3
10	AM	21	(Serbia) Marko Mirić	0	1	0	1
10	AM	28	(Serbia) Vukan Savićević	0	0	1	1
10	DF	14	(Montenegro) Savo Pavićević	1	0	0	1
10	FW	40	(Serbia) Luka Jović	1	0	0	1
TOTALS				64	7	3	73

=== Clean sheets ===
Includes all competitive matches. The list is sorted by shirt number when total clean sheets are equal.

As of 8 December 2013

Rank	Pos	No.	Player	League	Cup	Europa League	Total
1	GK	1	(Montenegro) Boban Bajković	5	0	3	8
2	GK	22	(Serbia) Miloš Vesić	0	2	0	2
TOTALS				5	2	3	10

=== Captains ===
No.	P	Name	Country	No. games	Notes
10	CM	Nenad Milijaš	(Serbia)	32	Club captain
1	GK	Boban Bajković	(Montenegro)	1	Vice captain
33	MF	Miloš Ninković	(Serbia)	1	

Last updated: 28 May 2014
Source: Competitive match reports.
Competitive matches only
Matches started as captain only
Country: FIFA nationality; No.: Squad number; P: Position; Name: Player name; No. Games: Number of games started as captain.
