= Predrag Rajković =

Serbian footballer (born 1995)

Predrag Rajković Предраг Рајковић
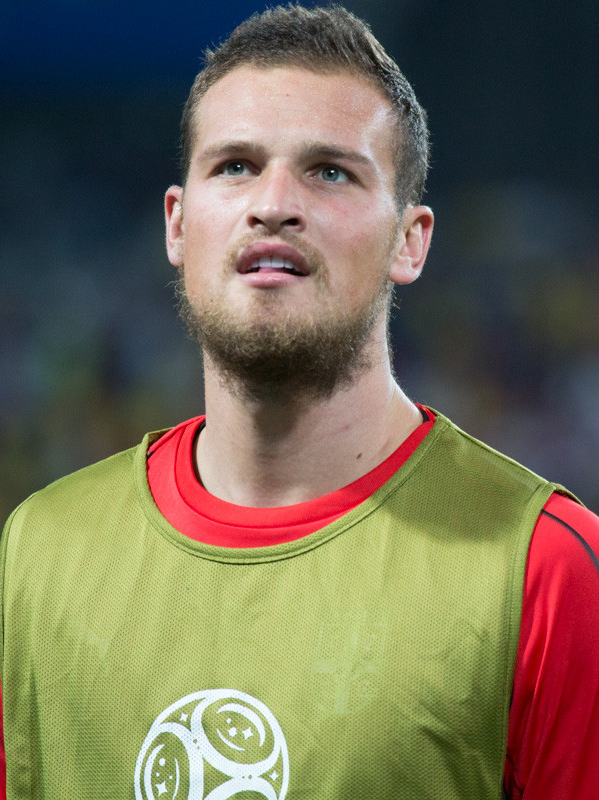
- Rajković with Serbia at the 2018 FIFA World Cup

Personal information
- Full name: Predrag Rajković
- Date of birth: 31 October 1995 (age 31)
- Place of birth: Negotin, Serbia, FR Yugoslavia
- Height: 1.91 m (6 ft 3 in)
- Position: Goalkeeper

Team information
- Current team: Al-Ittihad
- Number: 1

Youth career
- 2002–2009: Hajduk Veljko
- 2009–2013: Jagodina

Senior career*
Years	Team	Apps	(Gls)
2012–2013	Jagodina	4	(0)
2013–2015	Red Star Belgrade	35	(0)
2015–2019	Maccabi Tel Aviv	136	(0)
2019–2022	Reims	102	(0)
2022–2024	Mallorca	72	(0)
2024–	Al-Ittihad	68	(0)

International career^{‡}
2010–2011	Serbia U16	3	(0)
2011–2013	Serbia U17	6	(0)
2013–2014	Serbia U19	14	(0)
2015	Serbia U20	8	(0)
2013	Serbia U21	1	(0)
2013–	Serbia	44	(0)
Medal record
Men's football
Representing Serbia
FIFA U-20 World Cup
Winner	2015 New Zealand
UEFA U-19 Championship
Winner	2013 Lithuania
- * Club domestic league appearances and goals as of 16:02, 30 October 2026 (UTC) ‡ National team caps and goals as of 31 March 2026

Predrag Rajković (Serbian Cyrillic: Предраг Рајковић, pronounced [prêdraːɡ rǎːjkoʋitɕ]; born 31 October 1995) is a Serbian professional footballer who plays as a goalkeeper for Saudi Pro League club Al-Ittihad and the Serbia national team.

== Club career ==
=== Jagodina ===
Born in Negotin, he started training when he was 7 years old with his father Saša, who is also a former goalkeeper of Hajduk Veljko. He was with his hometown club until 2009, when he moved to Jagodina. For next 4 years, he played for youth teams of Jagodina, and was with first team since 2011–12 season, and was licensed with jersey number 45. Next season, Bondžulić changed his squad number to 11 again, so Rajković took 1. Although Bondžulić was the first choice, Rajković mainly was his reserve in front of competitors Petar Jokić and Stevica Zdravković. He made his professional debut for Jagodina on 9 March 2013 in a Serbian SuperLiga match versus Partizan. Until the end of 2012–13 season, he made one more match against Smederevo. After Bondžulić's departure, Anđelko Đuričić joined Jagodina. After first fixture and lose against Napredak Kruševac, Mladen Dodić decided to give Rajković a chance, because of his merits in winning 2013 UEFA European Under-19 Championship. But, after 2 appearances in new season, Rajković left to Red Star Belgrade. Jagodina should receive 30 percent of his next transfer.

=== Red Star Belgrade ===
==== 2013–14 season ====
He signed a four-year contract with Red Star Belgrade on 28 August 2013, and took the jersey number 95, according to year of his birth. He acted as a backup to Boban Bajković, and fought for a place on the bench with Miloš Vesić. He made his official debut for Red Star in last fixture against Vojvodina.

==== 2014–15 season ====
After Bajković's and Vesić's departures, Rajković stayed with a year younger Filip Manojlović and Marko Trkulja who returned from Spartak Subotica, where he was on loan. Club management decided to sign a more experienced goalkeeper, and Damir Kahriman joined Red Star. But Kahriman couldn't play at the beginning of the season because of administrative problems, so Rajković started the season as a first choice. After Milijaš's departure, Mijailović's suspension, Luković's injury, and Lazović's conflict with management, coach Nenad Lalatović decided to give the captain's armband to Rajković. He had 16 clean sheets in 28 league appearances, and was selected as the best goalkeeper in 2014–15 season, chosen by other players.

==== 2015–16 season ====
On 29 June 2015, Rajković signed a new three-year contract with Red Star, after days of speculation about his potential transfer away from the club. After winning 2015 FIFA U-20 World Cup in New Zealand and the award for the best goalkeeper of the tournament, many European clubs wanted Rajković, including French Ligue 1 club Lyon, Belgian side Club Brugge and according to some reports Italian giant Serie A club A.C. Milan. The Crvena zvezda captain was also a top target for Paris Saint Germain along with Kevin Trapp, who signed for Les Parisiens at the end. Rajković was the best member in team during both matches against Kairat in the first qualifying round of the Europa League. Rajković kept the team from suffering a deeper loss with some incredible saves. The coach of Kairat, Vladimír Weiss, said after the game that Rajković is one of the best goalkeepers in Europe. After great saves in first rounds of the Serbian SuperLiga, despite Zvezda's poor start, Turkish champion Galatasaray declared interest in him.

Predrag Rajković was one of the contestants at 2018 FIFA World Cup qualifying draw, which took place at the Konstantinovsky Palace in Strelna, Saint Petersburg on 25 July 2015.

=== Maccabi Tel Aviv ===
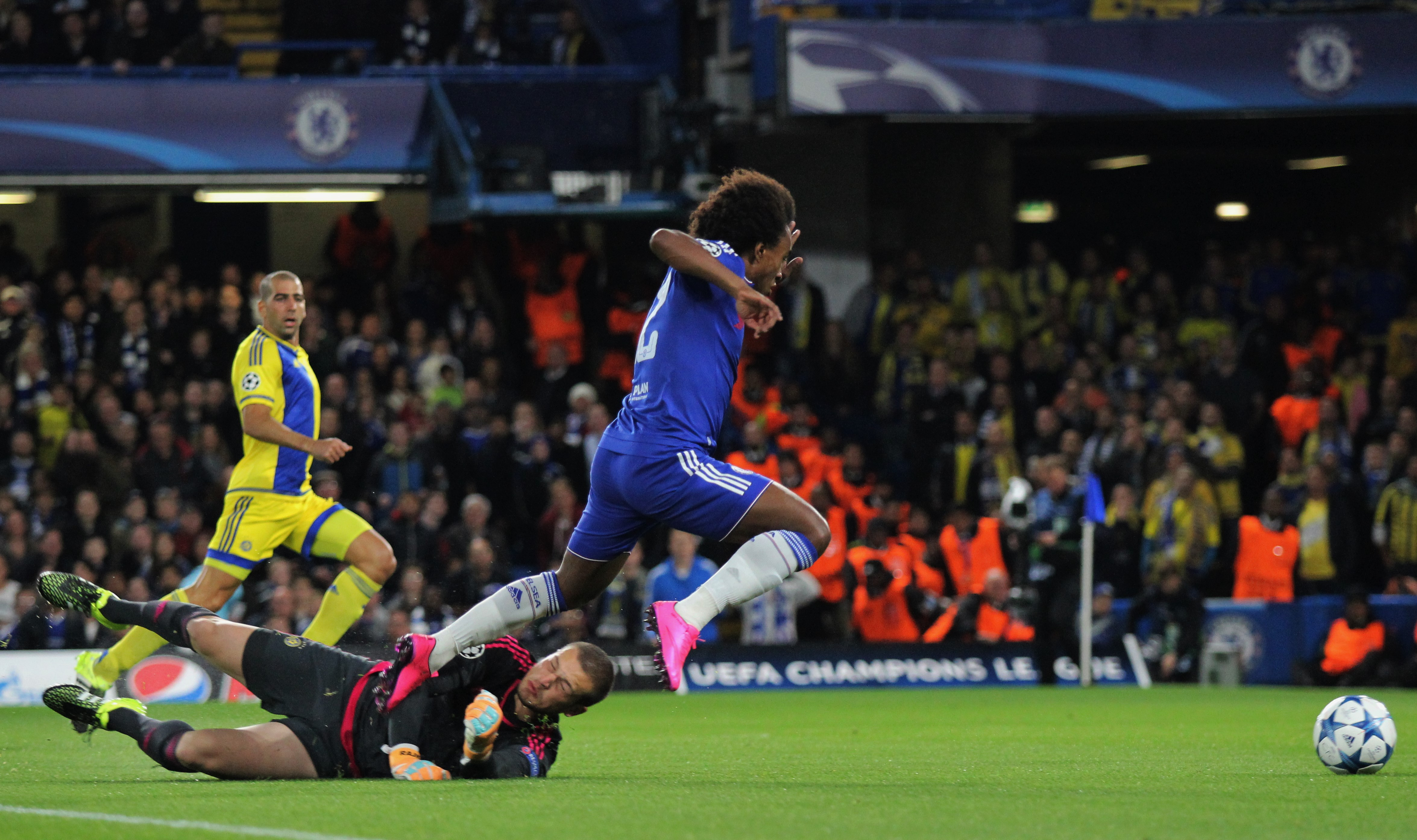
Rajković for Maccabi in a UEFA Champions League match against Chelsea in 2015

On 29 August 2015, Rajković signed a five-year contract with Maccabi Tel Aviv. The transfer fee was €3 million. On 30 August, Rajković made his Israeli Premier League debut in a 1–0 victory over Hapoel Be'er Sheva during the second league match of the season. Rajković made 43 appearances in all competitions, including Israeli Premier League, State Cup, Toto Cup in which he did not play and UEFA Champions League. He noted 21 clean sheets at total until the end of 2015–16 season. Rajković also continued playing as the first choice goalkeeper in the 2016–17 Israeli Premier League season. During the first half-season, he also made 14 appearances in the UEFA Europa League, which the club ended at third place in group stage. Rajković made an assist to Viðar Örn Kjartansson in the State Cup match against Hapoel Bnei Lod played on 7 January 2017, saving a shot from the opponent's previous attack. In May same year, Rajković was elected for the club's player of the season in an inner club event. On 14 December 2017, Rajković won the Toto Cup trophy with Maccabi, beating Hapoel Be'er Sheva in final match of the competition.

=== Reims ===
On 23 July 2019, Rajković signed a four-year contract with Stade de Reims. The transfer fee was €3 million. Rajkovic was brought in for the outgoing Edouard Mendy, who was on his way to Stade Rennais after a summer of heavy speculation on his future. Mendy had been hugely impressive in his first season in Ligue 1, keeping 14 clean sheets bettered only by Lyon's Anthony Lopes and Nice's Walter Benitez. In his first season in the Champagne region, Rajković will have youth academy product Nicolas Lemaitre as a backup. Rajković made his debut on 10 August 2019 in a 2–0 away win against Marseille.

=== Mallorca ===
On 22 July 2022, Rajković signed for La Liga club Mallorca on a four-year contract. The transfer fee paid to Reims was of €4.5 million, with a sell-on clause included in the deal as well.

=== Al-Ittihad ===
On 5 August 2024, Rajković was transferred to Saudi Pro League club Al-Ittihad.

== International career ==
=== Youth ===
Rajković was a member of the Serbia U-16 and Serbia U-17 national teams. Radovan Ćurčić, coach of Serbia U-21, called him for a friendly match against Israel, played on 6 February 2013. Rajković was one of the most deserving players for winning the 2013 UEFA European Under-19 Championship, when he saved goal many times with great interventions and stopped penalties.

In 2014, Rajković represented the Serbian youth team that lost against Portugal in the semi-final after penalties. In the quarter-final, Rajković saved two penalties and missed one in a penalty shootout against the United States. After Maksimović's goal, Serbia advanced to the next round. In the final, Rajković was one of the most important men on the field, keeping the result with incredible saves, being awarded the best goalkeeper in the competition.

=== Senior ===
In 2013, Rajković received his first call-up for the Serbian senior squad under coach Siniša Mihajlović. He debuted the same year on 7 August in a friendly match against Colombia.

Rajković was selected in Serbia's squad for the 2018 and 2022 FIFA World Cups, but did not make any appearance in both tournaments.

Rajković was selected in Serbia's squad for the UEFA Euro 2024. He played in all three group stage matches, against England, Slovenia and Denmark.Serbia finished fourth in the group.

== Personal life ==
On 8 August 2018, Rajković married his Serbian girlfriend Ana Cakić. Predrag picked his teammate from the Serbia national team, Saša Zdjelar, for his best man on the wedding. They have two sons and a daughter together.

== Career statistics ==
=== Club ===
As of match played 20 October 2026

Appearances and goals by club, season and competition
Club	Season	League			National cup (Note: Includes Israel State Cup, King's Cup)		League cup (Note: Includes Toto Cup, Coupe de la Ligue)		Continental		Other		Total	
Club	Season	Division	Apps	Goals	Apps	Goals	Apps	Goals	Apps	Goals	Apps	Goals	Apps	Goals
Jagodina	2011–12	Serbian SuperLiga	0	0	—		—		—		—		0	0
Jagodina	2012–13	Serbian SuperLiga	2	0	0	0	—		0	0	—		2	0
Jagodina	2013–14	Serbian SuperLiga	2	0	0	0	—		0	0	—		2	0
Jagodina	Total		4	0	0	0	—		0	0	—		4	0
Red Star Belgrade	2013–14	Serbian SuperLiga	1	0	0	0	—		0	0	—		1	0
Red Star Belgrade	2014–15	Serbian SuperLiga	28	0	0	0	—		—		—		28	0
Red Star Belgrade	2015–16	Serbian SuperLiga	6	0	—		—		2	0	—		8	0
Red Star Belgrade	Total		35	0	0	0	—		2	0	—		37	0
Maccabi Tel Aviv	2015–16	Israeli Premier League	34	0	3	0	0	0	6 (Note: Appearances in UEFA Champions League)	0	—		43	0
Maccabi Tel Aviv	2016–17	Israeli Premier League	35	0	6	0	2	0	14 (Note: Appearances in UEFA Europa League)	0	—		57	0
Maccabi Tel Aviv	2017–18	Israeli Premier League	36	0	1	0	5	0	14	0	—		56	0
Maccabi Tel Aviv	2018–19	Israeli Premier League	31	0	4	0	3	0	8	0	—		46	0
Maccabi Tel Aviv	Total		136	0	14	0	10	0	42	0	—		202	0
Reims	2019–20	Ligue 1	27	0	0	0	3	0	—		—		30	0
Reims	2020–21	Ligue 1	37	0	0	0	—		2	0	—		39	0
Reims	2021–22	Ligue 1	38	0	0	0	—		—		—		37	0
Reims	Total		102	0	0	0	3	0	2	0	—		107	0
Mallorca	2022–23	La Liga	36	0	0	0	—		—		—		36	0
Mallorca	2023–24	La Liga	36	0	0	0	—		—		—		36	0
Mallorca	Total		72	0	0	0	—		—		—		72	0
Al-Ittihad	2024–25	Saudi Pro League	28	0	5	0	—		—		—		33	0
Al-Ittihad	2025–26	Saudi Pro League	30	0	4	0	—		10 (Note: Appearances in AFC Champions League Elite)	0	0	0	44	0
Al-Ittihad	2026–27	Saudi Pro League	8	0	1	0	—		3	0	—		12	0
Al-Ittihad	Total		66	0	10	0	—		13	0	0	0	89	0
Career total			414	0	24	0	13	0	59	0	0	0	510	0

=== International ===
As of match played 31 March 2026

Appearances and goals by national team and year
National team	Year	Apps	Goals
Serbia	2013	1	0
Serbia	2014	0	0
Serbia	2015	1	0
Serbia	2016	3	0
Serbia	2017	2	0
Serbia	2018	4	0
Serbia	2019	2	0
Serbia	2020	5	0
Serbia	2021	8	0
Serbia	2022	2	0
Serbia	2023	2	0
Serbia	2024	9	0
Serbia	2025	4	0
Serbia	2026	1	0
Total		44	0

== Honours ==
Jagodina

- Serbian Cup: 2012–13

Red Star Belgrade

- Serbian SuperLiga: 2013–14

Maccabi Tel Aviv

- Israeli Premier League: 2018–19
- Toto Cup: 2017–18, 2018–19

Al-Ittihad

- Saudi Pro League: 2024–25
- King's Cup: 2024–25

Serbia

- UEFA European U-19 Championship: 2013
- FIFA U-20 World Cup: 2015

Individual

- The Best Young Athlete of Serbia: 2013
- UEFA European Under-19 Championship Team of the Tournament: 2013
- FIFA U-20 World Cup Golden Glove: 2015
- Serbian SuperLiga Team of the Season: 2014–15
