= Marko Petković =

Serbian footballer (born 1992)

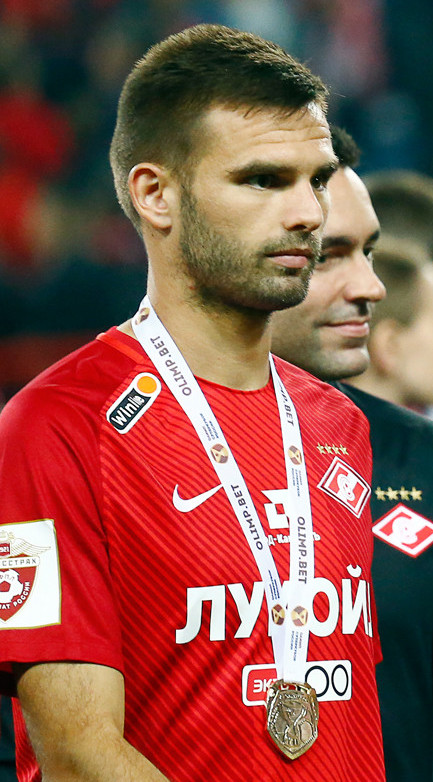
- Petković with Spartak in 2017

Personal information
- Date of birth: 3 September 1992 (age 34)
- Place of birth: Sremska Mitrovica, Serbia, FR Yugoslavia
- Height: 1.85 m (6 ft 1 in)
- Position: Right-back

Senior career*
Years	Team	Apps	(Gls)
2010–2013	OFK Beograd	67	(1)
2013–2017	Red Star Belgrade	98	(4)
2017–2019	Spartak Moscow	12	(0)
2019–2020	Tondela	7	(0)
2020–2022	TSC	36	(4)
2022–2023	Honvéd	12	(1)
2023	Egaleo	6	(0)
2024–2026	Radnički Niš	31	(1)

International career^{‡}
2010–2011	Serbia U19	8	(1)
2011–2015	Serbia U21	21	(0)
2015–	Serbia	4	(0)
- * Club domestic league appearances and goals as of 13 June 2026 ‡ National team caps and goals as of 11 June 2021

Marko Petković (Serbian Cyrillic: Марко Петковић, pronounced [mâːrko pêtkoʋitɕ]; born 3 September 1992) is a Serbian professional footballer who plays as a right-back.

== Club career ==
=== OFK Beograd ===
Petković made his professional debut with OFK's senior team in the 2010-11 season. By the end of that season he made 17 league appearances that season. Overall, Petković spent a total of eight years in OFK Beograd from the time he was enrolled in the youth system.

=== Red Star Belgrade ===
Right at the transfer deadline, Petković signed with Red Star Belgrade at the end of August 2013. On November 20, 2013, it was announced that teammate and right-back Marko Vešović was injured, resulting in Petković being called up by coach Slaviša Stojanović afterwards.

=== Spartak Moscow ===
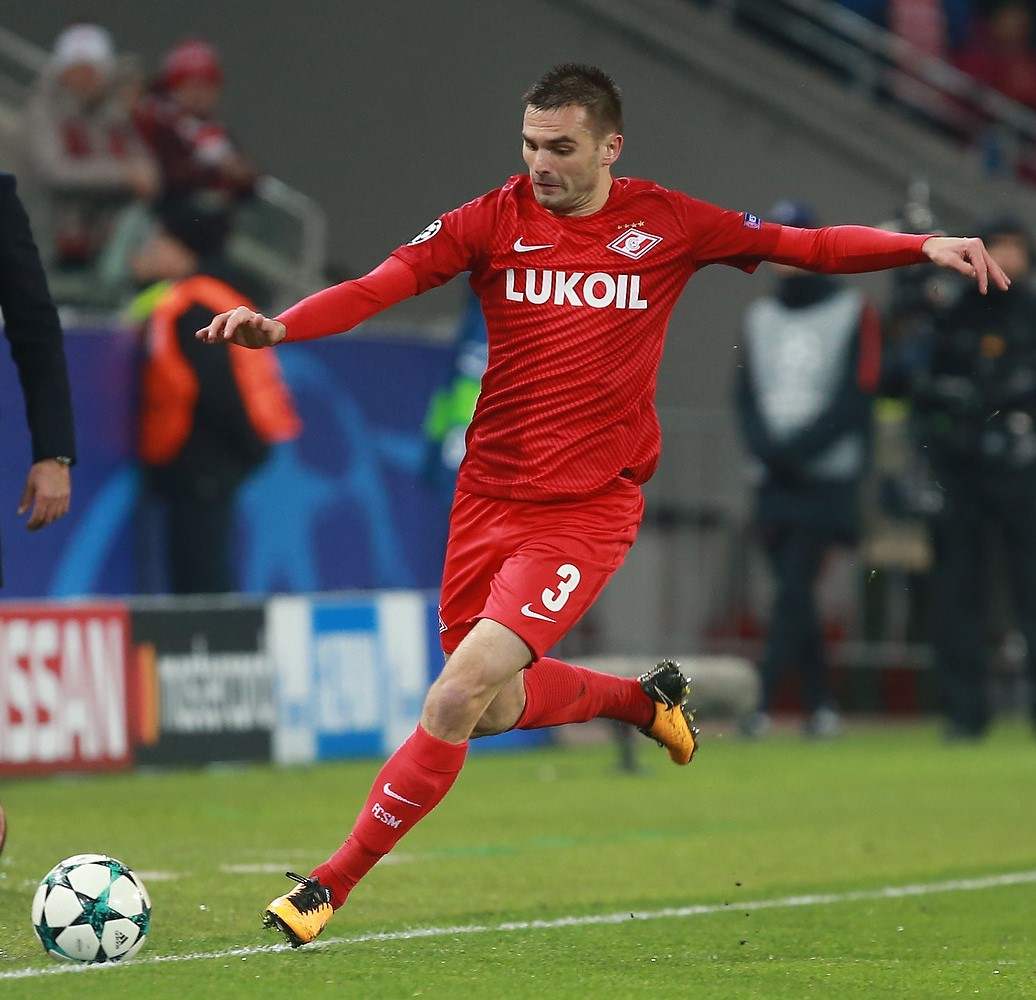
Petković in action for FC Spartak Moscow in 2017–18 UEFA Champions League

On 1 July 2017, he signed a contract with the Russian Premier League champion FC Spartak Moscow. He was released from his Spartak contract on 8 January 2019.

=== Honvéd ===
On 11 January 2022, Petković signed a 1.5-year contract with Honvéd in Hungary.

== International career ==
He was member of the Serbia national under-19 football team and began captaining the Serbia national under-21 football team in 2013. He made his debut for the senior squad on 13 November 2015 in a friendly against Czech Republic as a 82nd-minute substitute for Nenad Tomović. He played his most recent international in June 2021 against Japan.

== Career statistics ==
=== Club ===
As of 15 May 2022

Club	Season	League			National Cup		Continental		Total	
Club	Season	Division	Apps	Goals	Apps	Goals	Apps	Goals	Apps	Goals
OFK Beograd	2010–11	Serbian SuperLiga	17	0	0	0	3	0	20	0
OFK Beograd	2011–12	Serbian SuperLiga	26	0	2	0	–		28	0
OFK Beograd	2012–13	Serbian SuperLiga	21	0	5	0	–		26	0
OFK Beograd	2013–14	Serbian SuperLiga	3	1	0	0	–		3	1
OFK Beograd	Total		67	1	7	0	3	0	77	1
Red Star Belgrade	2013–14	Serbian SuperLiga	17	0	1	0	–		18	0
Red Star Belgrade	2014–15	Serbian SuperLiga	13	0	1	0	–		14	0
Red Star Belgrade	2015–16	Serbian SuperLiga	33	0	1	0	1	0	35	0
Red Star Belgrade	2016–17	Serbian SuperLiga	35	4	5	0	0	0	40	4
Red Star Belgrade	Total		98	4	8	0	1	0	107	4
FC Spartak Moscow	2017–18	Russian Premier League	7	0	1	0	2	0	10	0
FC Spartak Moscow	2018–19	Russian Premier League	5	0	1	0	0	0	6	0
FC Spartak Moscow	Total		12	0	2	0	2	0	16	0
Tondela	2019–20	Primeira Liga	7	0	0	0	–		7	0
TSC	2020–21	Serbian SuperLiga	24	3	1	0	–		25	3
TSC	2021–22	Serbian SuperLiga	12	1	1	1	–		13	2
TSC	Total		36	4	2	1	0	0	38	4
Budapest Honvéd	2021–22	Nemzeti Bajnokság I	12	1	1	0	–		13	1
Career total			232	10	20	1	6	0	258	11

=== International ===
As of 11 June 2021

Serbia
Year	Apps	Goals
2015	1	0
2016	1	0
2021	2	0
Total	4	0

== Honours ==
Red Star Belgrade

- Serbian SuperLiga: 2013–14, 2015–16

Spartak Moscow

- Russian Super Cup: 2017
