= Gogic =

Gogic may refer to:

- Alex Gogić, Cypriot footballer
- Goran Gogić (1986–2015), Serbian footballer
- Siniša Gogić (born 1963), Serbian-born Cypriot footballer
