= Marko Marinković =

Serbian footballer (born 1994)

Personal information
- Date of birth: 6 January 1994 (age 32)
- Place of birth: Užice, FR Yugoslavia
- Height: 1.92 m (6 ft 4 in)
- Position: Centre-back

Team information
- Current team: Jagodina

Youth career
- Red Star Belgrade

Senior career*
Years	Team	Apps	(Gls)
2012–2016	Red Star Belgrade	0	(0)
2012–2013	→ Sopot (loan)	15	(2)
2013–2014	→ Smederevo (loan)	17	(0)
2014–2015	→ Sinđelić Beograd (loan)	28	(2)
2015	→ Spartak Subotica (loan)	5	(0)
2016	→ BSK Borča (loan)	11	(3)
2016	BSK Borča	13	(0)
2017–2018	Borac Čačak	27	(0)
2018–2019	Napredak Kruševac	24	(1)
2019	Spartak Trnava	3	(0)
2020	Sloboda Tuzla	2	(0)
2020–2021	Novi Pazar	22	(0)
2021–2022	Budućnost Dobanovci	28	(2)
2022–2023	Sileks	2	(0)
2023	Loznica	17	(0)
2024	Hajduk 1912		
2024-	Jagodina		

International career
2011	Serbia U17	3	(0)
- * Club domestic league appearances and goals as of 25 June 2023

Marko Marinković (Serbian Cyrillic: Марко Маринковић; born 6 January 1994) is a Serbian professional footballer who plays as a centre-back for Jagodina.

== Club career ==
=== Red Star Belgrade ===
Born in Užice, Marinković passed the Red Star Belgrade youth school. During the time he spent under contract with the team, Marinković did not make an official debut for Red Star Belgrade. He terminated the deal in summer 2016.

After he spenth his youth categories, Marinković was loaned to club from Sopot for the 2012–13 season, together with Darko Lazić and some other players from youth team of Red Star Belgrade. He played 15 matches and scored 2 goals until the end of season.

In summer 2013, he returned from loan he spent in Sopot, and was with first team on the beginning of 2013–14 season. After 2 matches in qualifications for the 2013–14 UEFA Europa League against ÍBV, he spent sitting on the bench, Marinković was sent to Smederevo on loan. He made 17 First League appearances, and also played 1 cup match against Čukarički.

For 2014–15, Marinković was loaned to Sinđelić Beograd. He made 28 First League appearances with 27 starts, and was substituted in for one time, and played one cup match against Sloboda Užice. He also scored two goals, against Bežanija in the 1st, and Sloga Kraljevo in 14th fixture of the Serbian First League. After Uroš Mirković moved to Donji Srem in winter break off-season, Marinković became the captain for the 2nd half of season.

Marinković was loaned to Spartak Subotica at the beginning of season 2015–16. He made his official debut for Spartak Subotica in the 3rd fixture of Serbian SuperLiga, against Mladost Lučani, played on 1 August 2015. After only 5 matches for Spartak, he returnted to Belgrade.

=== BSK Borča ===
At the beginning of 2016, Marinković moved to BSK Borča, on loan. He started match against Loznica in tandem with Aleksandar Cvetković, but he got the red card in 61 minute of match. Previously, he scored a goal beginning of second half. After missed several matches later, he returned in squad. He also scored goals for wins against ČSK Čelarevo in 25, and Napredak Kruševac in 29 fixture of the Serbian First League. During the spring half of 2015–16 season, Marinković made 11 league matches for BSK Borča at total.

Marinković also stayed with BSK Borča for the 2016–17 Serbian First League, but after he broke the contract with Red Star Belgrade, Marinković joined the club as a single player. Later, during the first half of the same season, he appeared in a cup match against his former club.

=== Borac Čačak ===
On 23 January 2017, Marinković signed a two-and-a-half-year deal with Borac Čačak.

== Career statistics ==
As of match played 20 July 2017

Club	Season	League			Cup		Continental		Other		Total	
Club	Season	Division	Apps	Goals	Apps	Goals	Apps	Goals	Apps	Goals	Apps	Goals
Red Star Belgrade	2012–13	Serbian SuperLiga	0	0	—		—		—		0	0
Red Star Belgrade	2013–14	Serbian SuperLiga	0	0	0	0	0	0	—		0	0
Red Star Belgrade	2014–15	Serbian SuperLiga	0	0	0	0	—		—		0	0
Red Star Belgrade	2015–16	Serbian SuperLiga	0	0	0	0	0	0	—		0	0
Red Star Belgrade	Total		0	0	0	0	0	0	—		0	0
Sopot	2012–13 (loan)	Serbian League Belgrade	15	2	—		—		—		15	2
Smederevo	2013–14 (loan)	Serbian First League	17	0	1	0	—		—		18	0
Sinđelić Beograd	2014–15 (loan)	Serbian First League	28	2	1	0	—		—		29	2
Spartak Subotica	2015–16 (loan)	Serbian SuperLiga	5	0	0	0	—		—		5	0
BSK Borča	2015–16 (loan)	Serbian First League	11	3	—		—		—		11	3
BSK Borča	2016–17	Serbian First League	13	0	2	0	—		—		15	0
BSK Borča	Total		24	3	2	0	—		—		26	3
Borac Čačak	2016–17	Serbian SuperLiga	9	0	1	0	—		—		10	0
Borac Čačak	2017–18	Serbian SuperLiga	0	0	0	0	—		—		0	0
Borac Čačak	Total		9	0	0	0	—		—		10	0
Career total			98	7	5	0	0	0	—		103	7
