= Darko Lazić (footballer) =

Serbian footballer

Personal information
- Date of birth: 19 July 1994 (age 32)
- Place of birth: Smederevska Palanka, FR Yugoslavia
- Height: 1.89 m (6 ft 2 1/2 in)
- Positions: Centre-back; right-back

Team information
- Current team: Grafičar
- Number: 15

Youth career
- Red Star Belgrade

Senior career*
Years	Team	Apps	(Gls)
2013–2015	Red Star Belgrade	31	(1)
2014	→ Spartak Subotica (loan)	6	(0)
2015–2017	Anzhi Makhachkala	36	(2)
2017–2018	Alanyaspor	4	(0)
2018	→ Denizlispor (loan)	5	(0)
2019–2020	Sarajevo	28	(1)
2020	Radnički Niš	3	(0)
2021–2022	Sarajevo	16	(2)
2022–2023	Borac Banja Luka	21	(0)
2024	AP Brera	9	(0)
2025–	Grafičar	48	(2)

International career
2011	Serbia U17		
2012	Serbia U18	5	(0)
2014–2017	Serbia U21	5	(1)
- * Club domestic league appearances and goals as of 14 May 2026

Darko Lazić (Serbian Cyrillic: Дарко Лазић; born 19 July 1994) is a Serbian professional footballer who plays as a defender for Grafičar.

== Club career ==
=== Red Star Belgrade ===
Lazić made his professional debut for Red Star Belgrade on 26 May 2013, in a Serbian SuperLiga match versus Vojvodina.

=== Anzhi Makhachkala ===
On 23 June 2015, Lazić signed a four-year contract with Russian Premier League side Anzhi Makhachkala.

=== Alanyaspor ===
On 31 January 2017, Lazić moved to Turkey, signing with Alanyaspor. While at Alanyaspor, he was loaned out to Denizlispor for the rest of the 2017–18 season. He left Alnyaspor in October 2018.

=== Sarajevo ===
On 11 January 2019, Lazić signed a one and a healf-year contract with Bosnian Premier League club Sarajevo. He made his official debut for Sarajevo in a 3–0 win over Tuzla City on 23 February 2019. Lazić scored his first goal for Sarajevo on 6 April 2019, in a 0–3 away win against Željezničar in the Sarajevo derby.

He won his first trophy with the club on 15 May 2019, after Sarajevo beat Široki Brijeg in the final and won the 2018–19 Bosnian Cup. Three days after the cup final, on 18 May 2019, Lazić also won the league title with Sarajevo after the club beat Zvijezda 09 4–0 at home.

He won his second league title with the club on 1 June 2020, though after the 2019–20 Bosnian Premier League season was ended abruptly due to the COVID-19 pandemic in Bosnia and Herzegovina and after which Sarajevo were by default crowned league champions for a second consecutive time. The next day, on 2 June, Lazić left Sarajevo after his contract with the club expired.

=== Radnički Niš ===
On 20 October 2020, Lazić returned to the Serbian SuperLiga, joining Radnički Niš.

=== Return to Sarajevo ===
On 17 June 2021, Lazić returned to the Bosnian Premier League, once again signing with Sarajevo.

== International career ==
Lazić represented Serbia on various youth international levels.

== Career statistics ==
=== Club ===
As of match played 7 November 2020

Club	Season	League	League		Cup		Continental		Total	
Club	Season	League	Apps	Goals	Apps	Goals	Apps	Goals	Apps	Goals
Red Star Belgrade	2012–13	Serbian SuperLiga	1	0	—		—		1	0
Red Star Belgrade	2013–14	Serbian SuperLiga	9	0	1	0	4	0	14	0
Red Star Belgrade	Total		10	0	1	0	4	0	15	0
Spartak Subotica (loan)	2013–14	Serbian SuperLiga	6	0	2	0	—		8	0
Red Star Belgrade	2014–15	Serbian SuperLiga	21	1	1	0	—		22	1
Anzhi	2015–16	Russian Premier League	25	2	3	1	—		28	3
Anzhi	2016–17	Russian Premier League	11	0	0	0	—		11	0
Anzhi	Total		36	2	3	1	—		39	3
Alanyaspor	2016–17	Süper Lig	4	0	—		—		4	0
Alanyaspor	2017–18	Süper Lig	0	0	—		—		0	0
Alanyaspor	Total		4	0	—		—		4	0
Denizlispor (loan)	2017–18	TFF First League	5	0	—		—		5	0
Sarajevo	2018–19	Bosnian Premier League	13	1	4	0	—		17	1
Sarajevo	2019–20	Bosnian Premier League	15	0	1	0	4	0	20	0
Sarajevo	Total		28	1	5	0	4	0	37	1
Radnički Niš	2020–21	Serbian SuperLiga	3	0	0	0	—		3	0
Sarajevo	2021–22	Bosnian Premier League	0	0	0	0	0	0	0	0
Career total			113	4	12	1	8	0	133	5

== Honours ==
Sarajevo

- Bosnian Premier League: 2018–19, 2019–20
- Bosnian Cup: 2018–19
