= Đorđe Rakić =

Serbian footballer (born 1985)

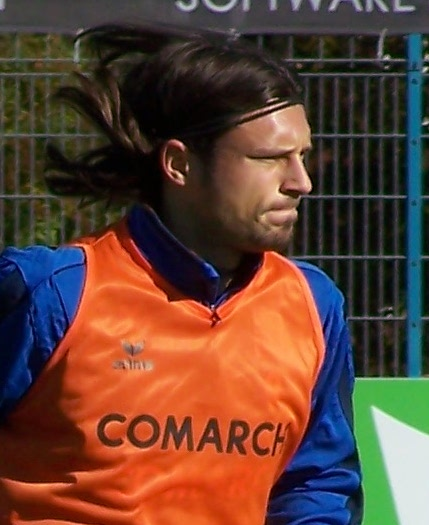
- Rakić training with 1860 Munich in 2010

Personal information
- Full name: Đorđe Rakić
- Date of birth: 31 October 1985 (age 41)
- Place of birth: Kragujevac, SR Serbia, SFR Yugoslavia
- Height: 1.88 m (6 ft 2 in)
- Position: Striker

Youth career
- Radnički Kragujevac

Senior career*
Years	Team	Apps	(Gls)
2003–2006	Radnički Kragujevac	64	(22)
2006–2007	OFK Beograd	41	(14)
2007–2010	Red Bull Salzburg	16	(2)
2008–2009	→ Reggina (loan)	6	(0)
2010–2012	1860 Munich	65	(13)
2012–2013	Al Gharafa	6	(1)
2013	Al Arabi	4	(1)
2013–2015	Red Star Belgrade	20	(7)
2015–2018	Qingdao Huanghai	70	(43)
2018	Zhejiang Greentown	4	(2)
2019	Lokomotiva Zagreb	10	(2)
2019–2020	Kalamata	12	(3)
2020	Lokomotiva Zagreb	5	(0)
Total		325	(110)

International career
2006–2007	Serbia U21	11	(0)
2008	Serbia U23	2	(1)

Managerial career
- 2020–2021: Lokomotiva Zagreb (assistant)
- 2022–2023: Al Nasr (assistant)
- 2024–2025: Al Bataeh (assistant)
- 2025–2026: Serbia U21 (assistant)
- 2026–: Red Star Belgrade (youth)
Medal record
Silver medal – second place	UEFA Under-21 Championship	2007
- * Club domestic league appearances and goals

Đorđe Rakić (Serbian Cyrillic: Ђорђе Ракић, pronounced [dʑôːrdʑe râːkitɕ]; born 31 October 1985) is a Serbian former professional footballer who played as a striker.

== Career ==
=== Club career ===
Rakić played for Radnički Kragujevac from 1992 until January 2006, then for OFK Beograd. In August 2007, he was transferred to Red Bull Salzburg. On 31 August 2008, he was loaned out to Reggina. He returned to Salzburg on 1 July 2009. He mostly played for the Red Bull Salzburg Juniors squad. However he was included in the first team squad for the second leg of playoff round of the UEFA Champions League qualifying phase against Maccabi Haifa. He was given the number 27 shirt for the first team. After being promoted from the reserves at Red Bull Salzburg, he signed a half-year loan deal with TSV 1860 Munich on 1 February 2010. On 8 August 2010, he transferred permanently to 1860 Munich. He signed with Qatari club Al Gharafa in November 2012, on a three-month basis as cover for injured striker Afonso Alves. On 17 June 2013, he signed a two-year contract with former European champions Red Star Belgrade.

=== Later career ===
On 23 August 2019, he signed with Greek Football League club Kalamata. He left the club in January 2020, returning to NK Lokomotiva Zagreb, before retiring at the end of the season. He was immediately appointed assistant coach of NK Lokomotiva Zagreb.

== International career ==
Rakić played for Serbia U21 team in the 2007 UEFA European Under-21 Championship in the Netherlands.

== Personal life ==
Since June 2013 Đorđe Rakić is married to his German wife Kim Danielle. They welcomed their daughter Aviana on 2 July 2014.

== Career statistics ==
As of match played 19 July 2020

Appearances and goals by club, season and competition
Club	Season	League			National Cup		Continental		Other		Total	
Club	Season	Division	Apps	Goals	Apps	Goals	Apps	Goals	Apps	Goals	Apps	Goals
Red Bull Salzburg	2007–08	Austrian Bundesliga	16	2	0	0	2	0	—		18	2
Red Bull Salzburg	2009–10	Austrian Bundesliga	0	0	1	4	2	0	—		3	4
Red Bull Salzburg	Total		16	2	1	4	4	0	—		21	6
Reggina (loan)	2008–09	Serie A	6	0	1	0	—		—		7	0
1860 Munich	2009–10	2. Bundesliga	14	3	—		—		—		8	3
1860 Munich	2010–11	2. Bundesliga	27	5	2	0	—		—		29	5
1860 Munich	2011–12	2. Bundesliga	24	5	1	0	—		—		25	5
1860 Munich	Total		65	13	3	0	—		—		68	13
Al Gharafa	2012–13	Qatar Stars League	6	1			—				6	1
Al Arabi	2012–13	Qatar Stars League	4	1			—				4	1
Red Star Belgrade	2013–14	Serbian SuperLiga	8	3	0	0	0	0	—		8	3
Red Star Belgrade	2014–15	Serbian SuperLiga	12	4	0	0	—		—		13	4
Red Star Belgrade	Total		20	7	0	0	0	0	—		29	3
Qingdao Huanghai	2015	China League One	25	10	0	0	—		—		24	19
Qingdao Huanghai	2016	China League One	24	14	0	0	—		—		27	17
Qingdao Huanghai	2017	China League One	21	19	1	0	—		—		22	19
Qingdao Huanghai	Total		70	43	1	0	—		—		71	43
Zhejiang Greentown	2018	China League One	4	2	0	0	—		—		4	2
Lokomotiva Zagreb	2018–19	1. HNL	10	2	—		—		—		10	2
Kalamata	2019–20	Football League Greece	12	3	3	0	—		—		15	3
Lokomotiva Zagreb	2019–20	1. HNL	5	0	0	0	—		—		5	0
Career total			218	74	9	4	4	0	0	0	231	78

== Honours ==
Red Star

- Serbian SuperLiga: 2013–14
