= Filip Kasalica =

Montenegrin footballer

Personal information
- Full name: Filip Kasalica
- Date of birth: 17 December 1988 (age 37)
- Place of birth: Titovo Užice, SFR Yugoslavia
- Height: 1.79 m (5 ft 10 in)
- Position: Forward

Youth career
- Sloboda Užice

Senior career*
Years	Team	Apps	(Gls)
2004–2008	OFK Beograd	4	(1)
2006	→ Jedinstvo Paraćin (loan)	11	(2)
2007	→ Mačva Šabac (loan)	13	(1)
2007	→ Srem (loan)	15	(3)
2008	→ Hajduk Kula (loan)	6	(0)
2008–2011	Hajduk Kula	66	(7)
2011–2012	Sloboda Užice	14	(7)
2012–2014	Red Star Belgrade	59	(9)
2014–2015	Ulsan Hyundai	14	(0)
2015	NK Istra 1961	14	(0)
2016	Ordabasy	26	(4)
2017	Napredak Kruševac	23	(3)
2018	Platanias	11	(0)
2018–2020	Rad	50	(3)
2020–2022	Radnički Niš	55	(5)
2022–2024	Grafičar Beograd	11	(0)
2023–2024	→ OFK Beograd (loan)	22	(1)
Total		414	(46)

International career^{‡}
2008–2010	Montenegro U21	8	(0)
2012–2014	Montenegro	11	(1)
- * Club domestic league appearances and goals as of 25 May 2024 ‡ National team caps and goals as of 5 March 2014

Filip Kasalica (Serbian Cyrillic: Филип Касалица; born 17 December 1988) is a Montenegrin retired professional footballer who played as a striker.

== Early life ==
Being the son of a former footballer, Kasalica was born in Titovo Užice, SR Serbia, SFR Yugoslavia. His father, Davor Kasalica, had played for the local team, FK Sloboda Užice.

== Club career ==
=== Early career ===
Filip started playing in OFK Beograd in 2004. After minor spells with Jedinstvo Paraćin, Mačva Šabac and Srem, he returned to the top flight by joining Hajduk Kula in 2008. In the first half of the 2011/12 season, Kasalica represented FK Sloboda Užice scoring a total of 7 goals in 14 appearances with 2 assists in the Serbian SuperLiga. He also made an appearance in the Serbian Cup in which se scored a goal. Due to these performances, the two biggest Serbian clubs, FK Partizan and Red Star Belgrade showed interest to sign Kasalica.

=== Red Star Belgrade ===
In December 2011, Kasalica joined Red Star Belgrade from Sloboda for a transfer fee of approximately €220,000. Filip made his debut for Red Star on 14 March 2012 in a match against Smederevo. He came in as a substitute in the 75th minute of the game. After only one minute and thirteen seconds, he managed to score his first goal for the club. This made him the player that scored the fastest goals in his debut in the history of Red Star, beating the 50-year-old previous record of three minutes and 42 seconds held by Bora Kostić. Only a week later on 21 March 2012, he scored a goal against Red Star's arch-rivals Partizan in the Eternal derby after coming on from the bench in the second half.

=== Ulsan Hyundai ===
On 9 July 2014, Kasalica joined Ulsan Hyundai from Red Star Belgrade.

=== Ordabasy ===
In January 2016, Kasalica moved to the Kazakhstan Premier League with FC Ordabasy.

== International career ==
Despite being born in Serbia, Kasalica accepted an invitation from coach Branko Brnović to represent the Montenegrin U-21 national team. He made his debut for the national team on 15 August 2012, during which he scored a goal against Latvia in the 76th minute. He has earned a total of 11 caps, scoring 1 goal. His final international was a March 2014 friendly match against Ghana.

== Career statistics ==
As of 17 March 2013

Club performance			League		Cup		Continental		Total	
Season	Club	League	Apps	Goals	Apps	Goals	Apps	Goals	Apps	Goals
Serbia			League		Serbian Cup		Europe		Total	
2007–08	Hajduk Kula	SuperLiga	6	0	0	0	0	0	6	0
2008–09	Hajduk Kula	SuperLiga	31	3	0	0	0	0	31	3
2009–10	Hajduk Kula	SuperLiga	11	2	0	0	0	0	11	2
2010–11	Hajduk Kula	SuperLiga	24	2	0	0	0	0	24	2
2011–12	Sloboda Užice	SuperLiga	14	7	1	1	0	0	15	8
2011–12	Red Star	SuperLiga	13	2	3	1	0	0	16	3
2012–13	Red Star	SuperLiga	17	4	3	0	5	3	25	7
			League		Cup		Continental		Total	
Total	Serbia		116	20	7	2	5	3	128	25
Career total			116	20	7	2	5	3	128	25

=== International goals ===
Scores and results list Montenegro's goal tally first.

#	Date	Venue	Opponent	Score	Result	Competition
1.	15 August 2012	Stadion Pod Goricom, Podgorica	Latvia	2–0	2–0	Friendly

== Honours ==
Red Star Belgrade

- Serbian SuperLiga: 2013–14
- Serbian Cup: 2011–12
