= Ifeanyi Onyilo =

Nigerian footballer

Personal information
- Full name: Ifeanyi Victor Onyilo
- Date of birth: 31 October 1990 (age 36)
- Place of birth: Enugu, Nigeria
- Height: 1.93 m (6 ft 4 in)
- Position: Forward

Senior career*
Years	Team	Apps	(Gls)
2007–2008	Chukson	17	(3)
2008–2013	Javor Ivanjica	74	(8)
2008–2009	→ Sloga Požega (loan)	13	(3)
2013–2015	Red Star Belgrade	7	(0)
2014–2015	→ Ermis Aradippou (loan)	27	(15)
2015–2017	Al-Faisaly	2	(0)
2016	→ Aris Limassol (loan)	9	(1)
2017	→ Kerkyra (loan)	3	(0)
2017–2018	Cova da Piedade	10	(1)
- * Club domestic league appearances and goals as of 13:50, 1 January 2020 (UTC)

Ifeany Victor Onyilo // (born 31 October 1990) is a Nigerian football player who plays as a forward. He last played for Portuguese side Cova da Piedade.

== Career ==
=== Javor ===
Born in Enugu, he begin his career in Nigeria playing with Chukson. In summer 2008 he moved to Serbia and signed with FK Javor Ivanjica. He spent the first season playing on loan at FK Sloga Požega. Being a foreigner with regular performances for so many seasons in the Serbian SuperLiga, earned him a move to the Serbian powerhouse Red Star Belgrade after five seasons spent with mid-table side Javor.

For unknown reasons, many websites wrongly name him "Onyilov" instead of Onyilo.

=== Red Star Belgrade & Ermis Aradippou ===
On 13 August 2013 Onyilo signed a four-year contract with Red Star Belgrade, having played last match with Javor on 11 August, precisely against Red Star Belgrade, in which Javor won 4-2, and Onyilo was the scorer of the second goal for Javor and also, was the most responsible for the exclusion of players from the opponent's team. Onyilo played the 2013–14 Serbian SuperLiga with Red Star making 7 appearances but without scoring. At the end of the season the team was restructured, and Onyilo was sent on loan to Ermis Aradippou playing in the Cypriot First Division, where he became prolific goalscorer by scoring 15 goals in 27 appearances in the 2014–15 Cypriot First Division.

=== Al-Faisaly ===
In summer 2015, Onyilo signed with Saudi Arabian club Al-Faisaly FC. He made two appearances with Al-Faisaly in the 2015–16 Saudi Professional League.

=== Aris Limassol ===
After Saudi Arabia, Onyilo returned to Cyprus, this time signing in summer 2016 with Aris Limassol FC playing in the Cypriot First Division. He made 3 appearances before released from the club.

== Honours ==
Red Star Belgrade

- Serbian SuperLiga: 2013–14

Ermis Aradippou

- Cypriot Super Cup: 2014
