= Miguel Araujo =

Peruvian footballer (born 1994)

Personal information
- Full name: Miguel Gianpierre Araujo Blanco
- Date of birth: 24 October 1994 (age 32)
- Place of birth: Villa María del Triunfo, Peru
- Height: 1.80 m (5 ft 11 in)
- Position: Centre-back

Team information
- Current team: Sporting Cristal
- Number: 20

Senior career*
Years	Team	Apps	(Gls)
2011	Cobresol	4	(0)
2012–2013	Sport Huancayo	43	(1)
2013–2014	Red Star Belgrade	5	(0)
2014–2019	Alianza Lima	117	(5)
2018–2019	→ Talleres (loan)	12	(0)
2019–2023	Emmen	105	(10)
2023–2025	Portland Timbers	26	(0)
2025–	Sporting Cristal	36	(5)

International career^{‡}
2010–2011	Peru U17	3	(0)
2012–2013	Peru U20	5	(1)
2014–	Peru	47	(1)
Medal record
Men's football
Representing Peru
Copa América
Runner-up	2019 Brazil
- * Club domestic league appearances and goals as of 23:17, 19 September 2026 (UTC) ‡ National team caps and goals as of 22:16, 6 October 2026 (UTC)

Miguel Gianpierre Araujo Blanco (born 24 October 1994) is a Peruvian professional footballer who plays as a centre-back for Sporting Cristal the Peru national team.

== Club career ==
=== Cobresol ===
Miguel Araujo started his senior career by joining Cobresol's first team on 13 July 2011. Then on 5 November 2011, at the age of 17, he made his league debut in the Torneo Descentralizado in matchday 27 away to Universidad César Vallejo. Araujo was included in the starting line-up by manager Teddy Cardama and was later changed for Jaime La Torre in stoppage time as the match finished in a 1–0 win for Vallejo. In his next match he played as a starter again in his side's 1–1 at home draw against Universitario de Deportes for matchday 28. He played the following matches as a starter and recorded his first win for his side in the 3–1 win over Colegio Nacional Iquitos for matchday 30.

=== Sport Huancayo ===
Araujo left Cobresol to join Sport Huancayo in January 2012. He played over 40 league matches with Sport Huancayo before making his move to Europe.

=== Red Star Belgrade ===
On 29 July 2013, he signed a four-year contract with Serbian club Red Star Belgrade and was assigned the number 20 on his jersey. He made his debut for the club in a 5–1 win over Novi Pazar on 19 October 2013, with manager Slaviša Stojanović describing his performance as "solid".

=== Alianza ===
Since his return from Serbia, Araujo has become regular in Alianza Lima in the following seasons.

=== Portland Timbers ===
On 30 June 2023, Araujo was announced to have agreed to join Major League Soccer side Portland Timbers on a two-year contract with the option for a further year. Araujo was waived by Portland on 29 May 2025.

== International career ==
Araujo was part of the Peru U17 national team that finished fourth at the 2011 South American Under-17 Football Championship and in the Peru U20 team at the 2013 South American Youth Championship.

On 27 March 2013, he received a call-up to the Peru senior national team for a match against Trinidad and Tobago. He made his debut for Peru on 18 November 2014, in a friendly match against Paraguay.

In June 2018, he was named in Peru's 23-man squad for the 2018 World Cup in Russia.

== Career statistics ==
=== Club ===
As of 19 September 2026

Appearances and goals by club, season and competition
Club	Season	League			Cup		League Cup		Continental		Other		Total	
Club	Season	Division	Apps	Goals	Apps	Goals	Apps	Goals	Apps	Goals	Apps	Goals	Apps	Goals
Cobresol	2011	Liga 1	4	0	—		—		—		—		4	0
Sport Huancayo	2012	Liga 1	22	0	—		—		1 (Note: Appearance(s) in Copa Libertadores)	0	—		23	0
Sport Huancayo	2013	Liga 1	21	1	—		—		—		—		21	1
Sport Huancayo	Total		43	1	—		—		1	0	—		44	1
Red Star Belgrade	2013-14	Serbian SuperLiga	5	0	1	0	—		—		—		5	0
Alianza Lima	2014	Liga 1	14	0	—		—		—		—		14	0
Alianza Lima	2015	Liga 1	28	2	8	0	—		2	0	—		38	2
Alianza Lima	2016	Liga 1	34	1	—		—		—		—		34	1
Alianza Lima	2017	Liga 1	29	0	—		—		2 (Note: Appearance(s) in Copa Sudamericana)	0	—		31	0
Alianza Lima	2018	Liga 1	12	2	—		—		5	0	—		17	2
Alianza Lima	Total		117	5	8	0	—		9	0	—		134	5
Talleres (loan)	2018-19	AFA Liga Profesional de Fútbol	12	0	0	0	—		1	0	4 (Note: Three appearances in Copa de la Superliga, One appearance in Torneos de Verano)	0	17	0
Emmen	2019-20	Eredivisie	12	1	—		—		—		—		12	1
Emmen	2020-21	Eredivisie	33	4	3	0	—		—		1 (Note: Appearance(s) in Relegation/Promotion Play-offs)	0	37	4
Emmen	2021-22	Eerste Divisie	29	4	2	0	—		—		—		31	4
Emmen	2022-23	Eredivisie	31	1	3	1	—		—		4	0	38	2
Emmen	Total		105	10	8	1	—		—		5	0	118	11
Portland Timbers	2023	MLS	3	0	—		—		—		2 (Note: Appearance(s) in Leagues Cup)	5	0	
Portland Timbers	2024	MLS	23	0	—		—		—		1	0	24	0
Portland Timbers	Total		26	0	—		—		—		3	0	29	0
Sporting Cristal	2025	Liga 1	16	2	—		—		0	0	—		16	2
Sporting Cristal	2026	Liga 1	20	3	—		2	0	11 (Note: Nine appearances in Copa Libertadores, two appearances in Copa Sudamericana)	0	—		33	3
Sporting Cristal	Total		36	5	—		2	0	11	0	—		49	5
Career Total			348	21	17	1	2	0	15	0	19	0	401	22

=== International ===
As of match played on 6 October 2026

Appearances and goals by national team and year
National team	Year	Apps	Goals
Peru	2014	1	0
Peru	2016	1	0
Peru	2017	4	0
Peru	2018	5	0
Peru	2019	6	0
Peru	2020	2	0
Peru	2021	2	0
Peru	2022	4	0
Peru	2023	4	0
Peru	2024	11	1
Peru	2025	2	0
Peru	2026	5	0
Total		47	1

No.	Date	Venue	Opponent	Score	Result	Competition
1.	11 October 2024	Estadio Nacional, Lima, Peru	Uruguay	1–0	1–0	2026 FIFA World Cup qualification

== Honours ==
Red Star

- Serbian SuperLiga: 2013–14

Emmen

- Eerste Divisie: 2021–22
