= Ljubo Nenadić =

Serbian footballer

Ljubo Nenadić Љубo Heнaдић
Personal information
- Date of birth: 29 April 1986 (age 40)
- Place of birth: Kragujevac, SFR Yugoslavia
- Height: 1.72 m (5 ft 8 in)
- Position: Left back

Team information
- Current team: Šumadija 1903

Youth career
- 1998–2003: Partizan

Senior career*
Years	Team	Apps	(Gls)
2003–2005	Partizan	0	(0)
2003–2004	→ Teleoptik (loan)	2	(0)
2004–2005	→ Grafičar Beograd (loan)	24	(2)
2005–2007	Radnički Kragujevac	53	(0)
2007–2011	Metalac Gornji Milanovac	104	(4)
2011–2012	Radnički Kragujevac	23	(0)
2012–2014	Red Star Belgrade	4	(0)
2013	→ Novi Pazar (loan)	7	(0)
2014–2015	Mladost Lučani	4	(0)
2016	Šumadija Kragujevac	11	(0)
2016–2018	Radnički Kragujevac	23	(0)
2018–	Šumadija 1903	0	(0)
- * Club domestic league appearances and goals as of 13 June 2017

Ljubo Nenadić (Serbian Cyrillic: Љубo Heнaдић; born 29 April 1986) is a Serbian football defender who plays for Šumadija 1903.

== Honours ==
Red Star Belgrade

- Serbian SuperLiga: 2013–14

Radnički Kragujevac

- Serbian League West: 2016–17

== External sources ==
- Ljubo Nenadić at Utakmica.rs (in Serbian)
