= 2007 UEFA European Under-21 Championship =

2007 UEFA Under-21 Championship
Europees kampioenschap voetbal onder 21 - 2007

Tournament details
- Host country: Netherlands
- Dates: 10–23 June
- Teams: 8 (finals); 51 (qualifying) (from 1 confederation)
- Venue: 4 (in 4 host cities)

Final positions
- Champions: Netherlands (2nd title)
- Runners-up: Serbia

Tournament statistics
- Matches played: 15
- Goals scored: 34 (2.27 per match)
- Attendance: 211,999 (14,133 per match)
- Top scorer: (Netherlands) Maceo Rigters (4 goals)
- Best player: (Netherlands) Royston Drenthe

The UEFA European Under-21 Championship 2007 were held from 10 to 23 June 2007. It was the 16th staging of UEFA's European Under-21 Championship.

== Summary ==
For the first time, a host nation was chosen ahead of the competition – the Netherlands, who were also the defending champions, were exempt from qualifying. The host nation was chosen on 15 December 2005. England, Italy, Portugal, Turkey, and Sweden also submitted bids. Of UEFA's 52 member countries, only the Faroe Islands did not compete in the qualification round for the tournament. That left 50 nations attempting to qualify for the seven remaining spots at the finals.

This was the first time that the competition's final matches took place in an odd-numbered year. UEFA took this decision with the will to give more visibility to the tournament, since during even-numbered years the competition was clouded by the approaching FIFA World Cup or the UEFA European Championship.

The tournament also served as the European qualifying tournament for the 2008 Summer Olympics, with a place for the four semi-finalists of the tournament. However, as England is not an Olympic nation, their team was ineligible for the Olympics; since England reached the semi-finals, a fifth-place playoff was necessary.

In this competition, a new UEFA penalty shoot-out record was established. The semi final between The Netherlands U21 and England U21 finished 1–1. Thirty-two penalties had to be taken before the tie was decided. The Netherlands U21 won 13–12, and went on to win the tournament by defeating Serbia U21 4–1 in the final.

After the final, some commotion arose in the Netherlands because several Dutch internationals with Surinamese roots carried the flag of Suriname with them during the trophy presentation. Dutch coach Foppe de Haan expressed the actions of these players as "inappropriate".

== Qualification ==
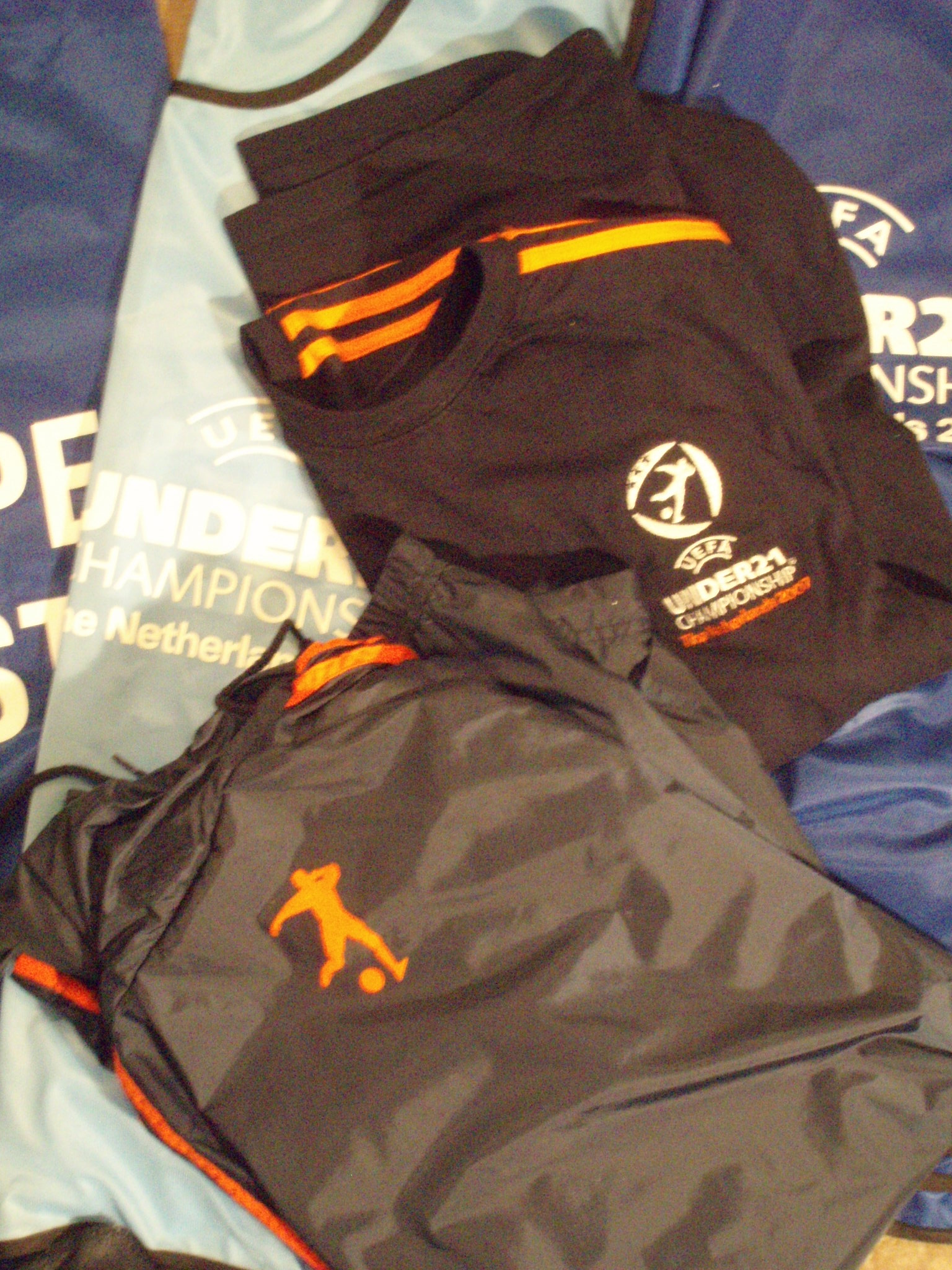
Steward outfit displaying the logo of the UEFA European Under-21 Championship 2007

In order to make the switch from even to odd-numbered years, the 2007 edition was a shortened version, condensed from a two-year campaign into a one-year campaign. Therefore, a completely new qualification format was devised to eliminate the weaker nations early, and saw a decrease in the size and duration of qualification groups.

== Finals tournament ==
=== Draw ===
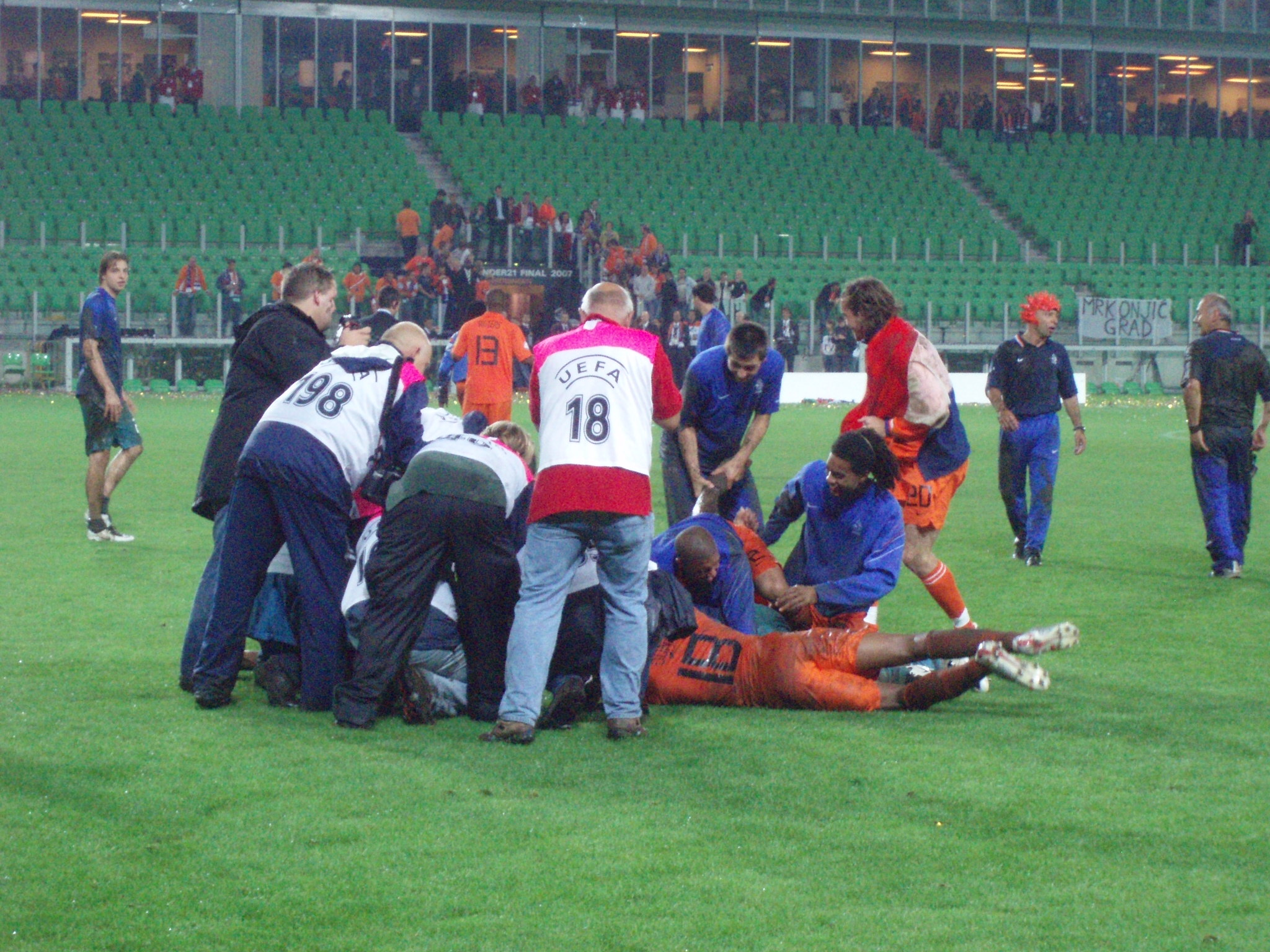
The Dutch team celebrating their victory after the final

The draw for the finals took place in Arnhem on 24 November 2006, putting the eight qualifying nations into two groups. The provisional dates for the group games are 10 June to 17 June 2007, with Heerenveen and Arnhem each staging a semi-final on 20 June. The final took place on Saturday 23 June at Euroborg in Groningen.

The opening game was between the Netherlands and Israel at 10 June.

=== Venues ===
City	Stadium	Capacity
Arnhem	Gelredome	25,000
Heerenveen	Abe Lenstra Stadion	26,100
Groningen	Euroborg	20,000
Nijmegen	De Goffert	13,000

== Group stage ==
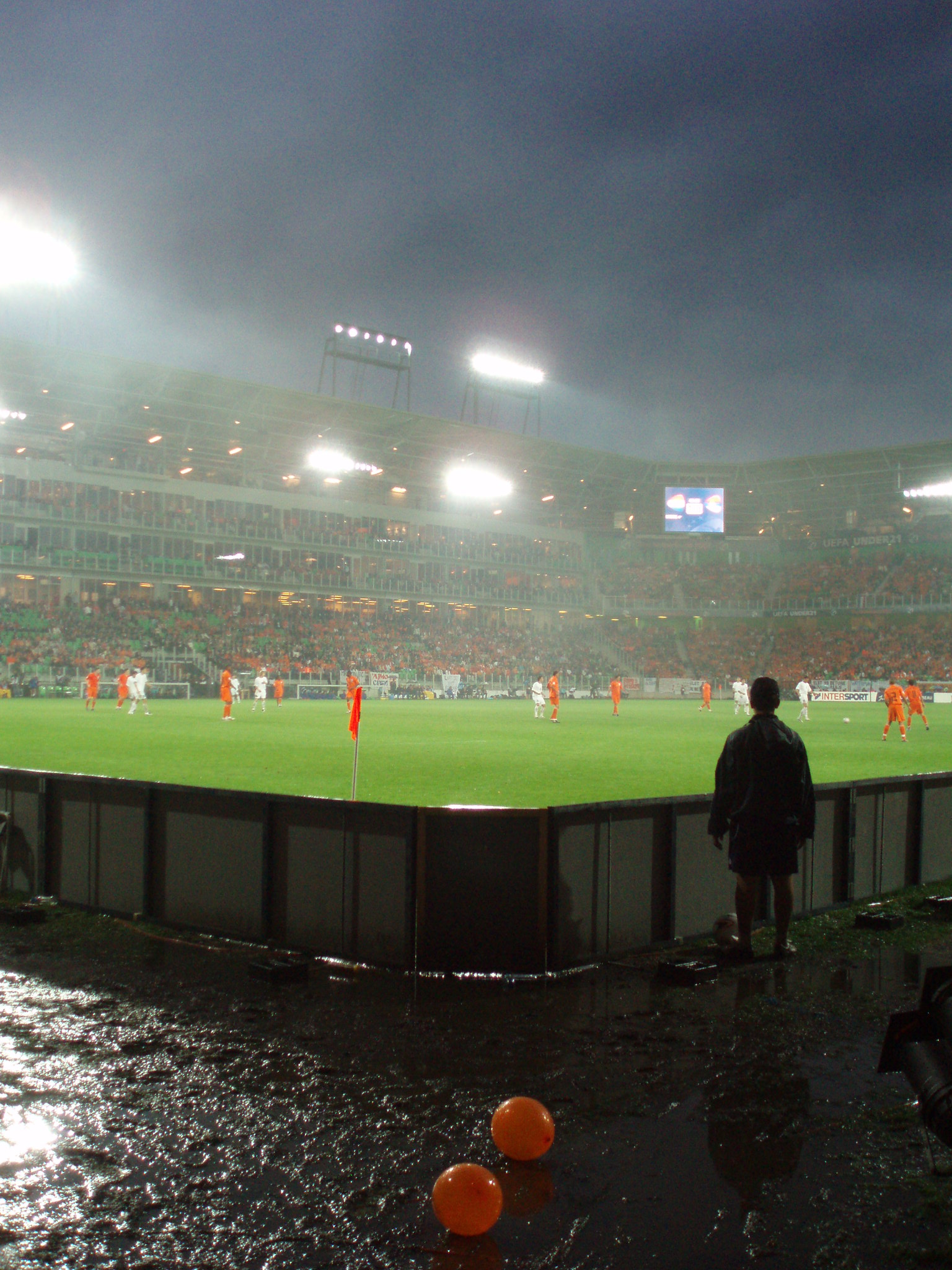
The final, Netherlands–Serbia, in the rain

Team qualified for the knockout stage
Team went to play-off for Olympics

=== Group A ===
Team	Pld	W	D	L	GF	GA	GD	Pts
Netherlands	3	2	1	0	5	3	+2	7
Belgium	3	1	2	0	3	2	+1	5
Portugal	3	1	1	1	5	2	+3	4
Israel	3	0	0	3	0	6	−6	0

10 June 2007
18:15 CEST

Netherlands	1–0	Israel
Maduro 10'	Report

Abe Lenstra Stadion, Heerenveen
Attendance: 22,013
Referee: Damir Skomina (Slovenia)
10 June 2007
20:45 CEST

Portugal	0–0	Belgium
	Report

Euroborg, Groningen
Attendance: 7,197
Referee: Robert Małek (Poland)

13 June 2007
18:15 CEST

Israel	0–1	Belgium
	Report	Mirallas 82'

Abe Lenstra Stadion, Heerenveen
Attendance: 5,239
Referee: Craig Thomson (Scotland)
13 June 2007
20:45 CEST

Netherlands	2–1	Portugal
Babel 33' (pen.); Rigters 75'	Report	Veloso 77'

Euroborg, Groningen
Attendance: 19,498
Referee: Knut Kircher (Germany)

16 June 2007
20:45 CEST

Netherlands	2–2	Belgium
Rigters 13'; Drenthe 37'	Report	Mirallas 9'; Pocognoli 70'

Abe Lenstra Stadion, Heerenveen
Attendance: 24,099
Referee: Stéphane Lannoy (France)
16 June 2007
20:45 CEST

Israel	0–4	Portugal
	Report	Fernandes 37'; Vaz Tê 45'; Veloso 49'; Nani 50'

Euroborg, Groningen
Attendance: 10,833
Referee: Zsolt Szabó (Hungary)

=== Group B ===
Team	Pld	W	D	L	GF	GA	GD	Pts
Serbia	3	2	0	1	2	2	0	6
England	3	1	2	0	4	2	+2	5
Italy	3	1	1	1	5	4	+1	4
Czech Republic	3	0	1	2	1	4	−3	1

11 June 2007
18:15 CEST

Czech Republic	0–0	England
	Report

Gelredome, Arnhem
Attendance: 9,382
Referee: Zsolt Szabó (Hungary)
11 June 2007
20:45 CEST

Serbia	1–0	Italy
Milovanović 63'	Report

De Goffert, Nijmegen
Attendance: 8,347
Referee: Stéphane Lannoy (France)

14 June 2007
18:15 CEST

Czech Republic	0–1	Serbia
	Report	Janković 90+3'

De Goffert, Nijmegen
Attendance: 6,109
Referee: Robert Małek (Poland)
14 June 2007
20:45 CEST

England	2–2	Italy
Nugent 24'; Lita 26'	Report	Chiellini 36'; Aquilani 69'

Gelredome, Arnhem
Attendance: 17,103
Referee: Damir Skomina (Slovenia)

17 June 2007
20:45 CEST

Italy	3–1	Czech Republic
Aquilani 4'; Chiellini 29'; Rossi 45+1'	Report	Papadopulos 14'

Gelredome, Arnhem
Attendance: 7,167
Referee: Craig Thomson (Scotland)
17 June 2007
20:45 CEST

England	2–0	Serbia
Lita 5'; Derbyshire 77'	Report

De Goffert, Nijmegen
Attendance: 9,133
Referee: Knut Kircher (Germany)

== Knockout stage ==
Semi-finals
20 June – Heerenveen
Netherlands	1 (13)
England	1 (12)
20 June – Arnhem
Serbia	2
Belgium	0

Final
23 June – Groningen
Netherlands	4
Serbia	1

=== Semi-finals ===
20 June 2007
18:15 CEST

Netherlands	1–1 (a.e.t.)	England
Rigters 89'	Report	Lita 39'
Penalties
Babel (penalty scored); Drenthe (penalty missed); Janssen (penalty scored); Beerens (penalty scored); Maduro (penalty scored); De Ridder (penalty scored); Zuiverloon (penalty scored); Rigters (penalty scored); Kruiswijk (penalty missed); Waterman (penalty scored); Beerens (penalty scored); Drenthe (penalty scored); Maduro (penalty scored); Janssen (penalty scored); De Ridder (penalty missed); Zuiverloon (penalty scored)	13–12	(penalty scored) Young; (penalty scored) Milner; (penalty scored) Noble; (penalty missed) Hoyte; (penalty scored) Derbyshire; (penalty scored) Ferdinand; (penalty scored) Carson; (penalty scored) Rosenior; (penalty missed) Reo-Coker; (penalty scored) Taylor; (penalty scored) Young; (penalty scored) Milner; (penalty scored) Noble; (penalty scored) Hoyte; (penalty missed) Derbyshire; (penalty missed) Ferdinand

Abe Lenstra Stadion, Heerenveen
Attendance: 23,467
Referee: Knut Kircher (Germany)

20 June 2007
20:45 CEST

Serbia	2–0	Belgium
Kolarov 4'; Mrđa 87'	Report

Gelredome, Arnhem
Attendance: 17,438
Referee: Robert Małek (Poland)

=== Final ===
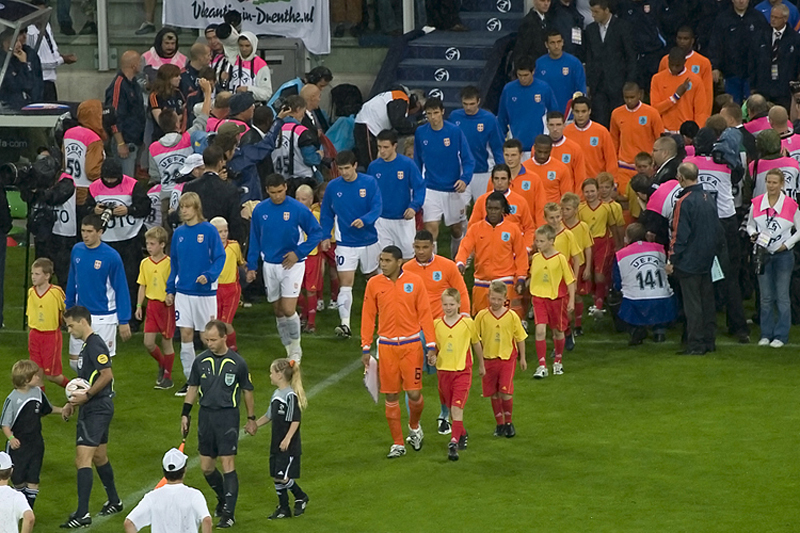
The Serbian and Dutch teams enter the pitch for the final

23 June 2007
20:45 CEST

Netherlands	4–1	Serbia
Bakkal 17'; Babel 60'; Rigters 67'; Bruins 87'	Report	Mrđa 79'

Euroborg, Groningen
Attendance: 19,813
Referee: Damir Skomina (Slovenia)

GK	1	Boy Waterman
RB	2	Gianni Zuiverloon
CB	18	Ryan Donk
CB	4	Arnold Kruiswijk
LB	5	Erik Pieters		(substituted off) 89'
DM	6	Hedwiges Maduro (c)
RM	13	Maceo Rigters		(substituted off) 69'
LM	8	Royston Drenthe	(yellow card) 9'	(substituted off) 78'
AM	10	Otman Bakkal
CF	11	Daniël de Ridder
CF	9	Ryan Babel
Substitutes:
MF	12	Luigi Bruins		(substituted on) 69'
FW	14	Roy Beerens	(yellow card) 89'	(substituted on) 78'
DF	19	Calvin Jong-a-Pin		(substituted on) 89'
Coach:
(Netherlands) Foppe de Haan

GK	1	Damir Kahriman
RB	3	Antonio Rukavina	(yellow card) 89'
CB	2	Branislav Ivanović (c)	(yellow card) 62'
CB	11	Duško Tošić	(yellow card) 43'
LB	6	Aleksandar Kolarov	(yellow card) 28' (yellow-red card) 62'
CM	7	Milan Smiljanić
CM	13	Nikola Drinčić		(substituted off) 65'
RW	19	Dušan Basta		(substituted off) 73'
AM	10	Dejan Milovanović
LW	8	Boško Janković
CF	9	Đorđe Rakić		(substituted off) 73'
Substitutes:
MF	21	Zoran Tošić		(substituted on) 65'
MF	14	Stefan Babović		(substituted on) 73'
FW	18	Dragan Mrđa	(yellow card) 82'	(substituted on) 73'
Coach:
(Serbia) Miroslav Đukić

Man of the Match:
Ryan Babel (Netherlands)

Assistant referees:
Manuel Navarro (Switzerland)
Tomáš Mokoš (Slovakia)
Fourth official:
Stéphane Lannoy (France)

== Awards ==
=== Best player ===
- Royston Drenthe (Netherlands)

=== Team of the tournament ===
Goalkeeper	Defenders	Midfielders	Forwards
(England) Scott Carson (Portugal) Paulo Ribeiro	(Serbia) Branislav Ivanović (Italy) Giorgio Chiellini (England) Leighton Baines (England) Steven Taylor (Portugal) Manuel da Costa (Netherlands) Gianni Zuiverloon (Serbia) Duško Tošić (Belgium) Jan Vertonghen (England) Ashley Young	(Netherlands) Royston Drenthe (Netherlands) Otman Bakkal (England) Nigel Reo-Coker (Portugal) Miguel Veloso (Portugal) Manuel Fernandes (Italy) Alessandro Rosina (Italy) Alberto Aquilani	(Belgium) Kevin Mirallas (Netherlands) Maceo Rigters (England) Leroy Lita (England) David Nugent (Netherlands) Ryan Babel

== Goalscorers ==
4 goals

- (Netherlands) Maceo Rigters

3 goals

- (England) Leroy Lita

2 goals

- (Italy) Alberto Aquilani
- (Netherlands) Ryan Babel
- (Italy) Giorgio Chiellini
- (Belgium) Kevin Mirallas
- (Serbia) Dragan Mrđa
- (Portugal) Miguel Veloso

1 goal

- (Netherlands) Otman Bakkal
- (Netherlands) Luigi Bruins
- (England) Matt Derbyshire
- (Netherlands) Royston Drenthe
- (Portugal) Manuel Fernandes
- (Serbia) Boško Janković
- (Serbia) Aleksandar Kolarov
- (Netherlands) Hedwiges Maduro
- (Serbia) Dejan Milovanović
- (Portugal) Nani
- (England) David Nugent
- (Czech Republic) Michal Papadopulos
- (Belgium) Sébastien Pocognoli
- (Italy) Giuseppe Rossi
- (Portugal) Ricardo Vaz Tê

== Medal table and Olympic qualifiers ==
Pos	Team	Pld	W	D	L	GF	GA	GD	Pts	Final result
1st place, gold medalist(s)	Netherlands (H)	5	3	2	0	10	5	+5	11	Champions
2nd place, silver medalist(s)	Serbia	5	3	0	2	5	6	−1	9	Runners-up
3rd place, bronze medalist(s)	England	4	1	3	0	5	3	+2	6	Eliminated in semi-finals
3rd place, bronze medalist(s)	Belgium	4	1	2	1	3	4	−1	5	Eliminated in semi-finals
5	Portugal	3	1	1	1	5	2	+3	4	Eliminated in group stage
6	Italy	3	1	1	1	5	4	+1	4	Eliminated in group stage
7	Czech Republic	3	0	1	2	1	4	−3	1	Eliminated in group stage
8	Israel	3	0	0	3	0	6	−6	0	Eliminated in group stage

Source: UEFA
(H) Hosts

=== Olympic qualifying play-off ===
The 2007 European Under-21 Championship also served as the European qualifying round for the 2008 Olympic football tournament. Europe's four places at the Olympics were to be filled by the four semi-finalists; however, because England, one of the semi-finalists, cannot compete independently at the Olympics, a play-off match between Portugal and Italy, the two third-placed teams in each group, was arranged to identify the fourth European team to go to Beijing. Italy defeated Portugal through a penalty shoot-out.

21 June 2007
20:45 CEST

Portugal	0–0 (a.e.t.)	Italy
	Report
Penalties
Moutinho (penalty scored); Nani (penalty scored); Fernandes (penalty missed); Veloso (penalty scored); Antunes (penalty missed)	3–4	(penalty scored) Pellè; (penalty scored) Montolivo; (penalty scored) Criscito; (penalty scored) Palladino

De Goffert, Nijmegen
Attendance: 5,161
Referee: Stéphane Lannoy (France)
