= Miloš Vesić =

Serbian footballer

Miloš Vesić Милош Весић
Personal information
- Full name: Miloš Vesić
- Date of birth: 23 July 1989 (age 37)
- Place of birth: Temerin, SFR Yugoslavia
- Height: 1.93 m (6 ft 4 in)
- Position: Goalkeeper

Youth career
- Vojvodina

Senior career*
Years	Team	Apps	(Gls)
2008–2011	Novi Sad	56	(2)
2011–2014	Red Star Belgrade	1	(0)
2014–2015	Radnički Kragujevac	2	(0)
2016–2018	Dinamo Vranje	34	(0)
2018–2019	Proleter Novi Sad	49	(0)
2019–2020	Dinamo Pančevo	20	(0)
2020–2021	Jagodina	19	(0)
Total		181	(2)
- * Club domestic league appearances and goals as of 17 November 2023

Miloš Vesić (Serbian Cyrillic: Милош Весић; born 23 July 1989) is a Serbian retired footballer who played as a goalkeeper. He last played for GFK Jagodina.

== Club career ==
=== Red Star Belgrade ===
In July 2011, Vesić moved to Red Star Belgrade. He made his league debut for the club over two years after signing, on 26 May 2013 in a 3-0 away defeat to FK Vojvodina. He played all ninety minutes of the match.

=== Radnički Kragujevac ===
In July 2014, Vesić moved to Radnički Kragujevac on a free transfer. He made his league debut for the club on 18 October 2014 in a 4-1 away defeat to FK Čukarički. He played all ninety minutes of the match. He was released in July 2015 after making only two appearances during his one-year spell.

=== Dinamo Vranje ===
After over a year being unattached, Vesić was picked up by Serbian First League club FK Dinamo Vranje. He made his league debut for the club on 9 October 2016 in a 2-1 home defeat to FK Budućnost Dobanovci. He played all ninety minutes of the match.

=== Proleter Novi Sad ===
In March 2018, Vesić moved to FK Proleter Novi Sad. He made his league debut for the club on 11 March 2018 in a 1-0 home victory over FK Sloboda Užice. He played all ninety minute of the match.

== Honours ==
Red Star

- Serbian SuperLiga (1): 2013–14
- Serbian Cup (1): 2011–12

Proleter Novi Sad

- Serbian First League (1): 2017–18
