= Goran Gogić =

Serbian footballer

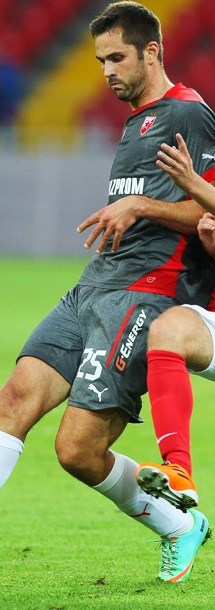
- Gogić in 2014

Personal information
- Full name: Goran Gogić
- Date of birth: 24 April 1986
- Place of birth: Titov Vrbas, SR Serbia, SFR Yugoslavia
- Date of death: 3 July 2015 (aged 29)
- Place of death: Qingdao, Shandong, China
- Height: 1.94 m (6 ft 4 in)
- Position: Defensive midfielder

Youth career
- 1998–2004: Red Star Belgrade

Senior career*
Years	Team	Apps	(Gls)
2004–2006	Jedinstvo Ub	50	(2)
2006–2007	Čukarički	20	(2)
2007–2009	Napredak Kruševac	45	(2)
2009–2010	Javor Ivanjica	41	(2)
2011–2013	Jagodina	54	(5)
2013–2014	Red Star Belgrade	27	(1)
2015	Qingdao Hainiu	15	(1)
Total		252	(15)
- * Club domestic league appearances and goals as of 27 June 2015

Goran Gogić (Serbian Cyrillic: Горан Гогић; 24 April 1986 – 3 July 2015) was a Serbian professional footballer.

== Career ==
Born in Vrbas, Serbia, Yugoslavia, he played with FK Jedinstvo Ub, FK Čukarički, FK Napredak Kruševac, FK Javor Ivanjica and FK Jagodina before joining Red Star Belgrade in summer of 2013.

He signed a contract with Red Star Belgrade in August 2013.

== Death ==
On 3 July 2015, Gogić collapsed and lost consciousness after a training session with Qingdao Hainiu. He died at 22:25 local time (14:25 UTC) on the same day.

== Honours ==
Jagodina

- Serbian Cup: 2013

Red Star Belgrade

- Serbian SuperLiga: 2013–14
