= Nikola Mijailović (footballer) =

Serbian footballer

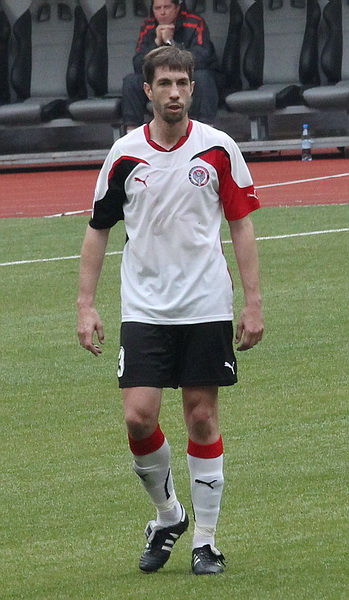
- Mijailović with Amkar Perm in 2011

Personal information
- Date of birth: 15 February 1982 (age 44)
- Place of birth: Zemun, SFR Yugoslavia
- Height: 1.85 m (6 ft 1 in)
- Positions: Left-back; left wing-back

Youth career
- Bežanija
- Obilić

Senior career*
| Years | Team | Apps | (Gls) |
| 1998–1999 | Zemun | 0 | (0) |
| 1999–2003 | Železnik | 48 | (2) |
| 2000–2001 | → Sremčica (loan) | 50 | (10) |
| 2004–2007 | Wisła Kraków | 58 | (1) |
| 2008 | FC Khimki | 5 | (0) |
| 2008 | Red Star Belgrade | 8 | (0) |
| 2009–2011 | Korona Kielce | 34 | (0) |
| 2011–2013 | Amkar Perm | 53 | (2) |
| 2013–2015 | Red Star Belgrade | 40 | (2) |
| Total | | 298 | (17) |

International career
| 2002–2004 | Serbia and Montenegro U21 | 16 | (1) |
| 2016– | Serbia (beach soccer) | 3 | (1) |
Medal record
Representing Serbia and Montenegro
UEFA Euro Under-21
| Runner-up | 2004 Germany |
- * Club domestic league appearances and goals

Nikola Mijailović (Serbian Cyrillic: Никола Мијаиловић; born 15 February 1982) is a Serbian former professional footballer.

== Club career ==
=== Amkar Perm ===
In 2011 Mijailović joined FC Amkar Perm, where coach Rashid Rakhimov frequently played him as defensive midfielder. When Miodrag Božović became Amkar's new coach, Mijailović moved to the left-back position. Mijailović played a total of 53 league games, in which he scored a total of two goals for Amkar.

=== Return to Red Star Belgrade ===
After five years of playing professional football in Poland and Russia, before which Mijailović played for Red Star, Red Star Belgrade was looking to bring back veterans from across borders. On 26 June 2013 Mijailović signed for Red Star Belgrade on a one-year contract. In 2015, he got suspended because of anonymous mails to Red Star Belgrade, in every letter first pasus formed this name – "Nikola Džoni" which is his nickname.

== International career ==
He was part of the Serbia and Montenegro under-21 team which were runners-up at the 2004 UEFA European Under-21 Championship. Mijalović plays as captain for the Serbia national beach soccer team. As a defender he could achieve his first goal at the 2016 Euro Beach Soccer League Division B game against Moldova.

== Honours ==
Wisła Kraków

- Ekstraklasa: 2003–04, 2004–05

Red Star

- Serbian SuperLiga: 2013–14

== External sources ==
- Nikola Mijailović at 90minut.pl (in Polish)
- Profile at Srbijafudbal
