= Dragan Mrđa =

Serbian footballer (born 1984)

- Dragan Mrdja before friendly match Serbia v. Bulgaria on 17 November 2010

Personal information
- Date of birth: 23 January 1984 (age 42)
- Place of birth: Vršac, SR Serbia, SFR Yugoslavia
- Height: 1.87 m (6 ft 2 in)
- Position: Forward

Youth career
- 2000–2001: Red Star Belgrade

Senior career*
Years	Team	Apps	(Gls)
2001–2005	Red Star Belgrade	39	(7)
2003–2005	→ Jedinstvo Ub (loan)	27	(10)
2005–2007	Lierse	30	(2)
2006	→ Zulte Waregem (loan)	5	(0)
2007–2008	Khimki	9	(2)
2008–2010	Vojvodina	56	(35)
2010–2013	Sion	32	(9)
2013–2014	Red Star Belgrade	27	(19)
2014–2017	Omiya Ardija	89	(34)
2017–2018	Shonan Bellmare	10	(1)
2018	Olimpija Ljubljana	1	(0)
Total		325	(119)

International career
2008–2014	Serbia	14	(2)

Managerial career
- 2022: Kashima Antlers (assistant)
Medal record
Silver medal – second place	UEFA Under-21 Championship	2007
- * Club domestic league appearances and goals

Dragan Mrđa (Serbian Cyrillic: Драган Мрђа; born 23 January 1984) is a Serbian football coach and a former forward. At international level, he has represented Serbia 14 times.

== Club career ==
=== Early career ===
After spending many years of his youth playing with Red Star Belgrade, during which he was loaned to FK Jedinstvo Ub, he decided to accept a challenge that came from Belgium and moved to Lierse S.K. in August 2005. In the summer of 2006, he was loaned to another Belgian First Division club, S.V. Zulte Waregem before moving to Russia to play with Premier League club FC Khimki.

=== Vojvodina ===
After one season in Russia, he returned to Serbia to join FK Vojvodina in the Serbian SuperLiga. In spite of arriving to the club off of dry spells in Belgium and Russia, he became Vojvodina's captain after a remarkably short period of time due to a spontaneous explosion of good form. His prolific goal-scoring with Vojvodina earned him calls from the Serbia national team from 2008, having been called up for a friendly against Bulgaria and another friendly match against Austria which took place the same year. By the end of the 2009–10 season, Mrđa had scored 22 goals in 29 league games and was named SuperLiga Player of the Year.

=== Sion ===
After two seasons spent in Novi Sad, in summer 2010, he signed a 3-year contract with Swiss side FC Sion. In March 2011 in a match against FC Zürich he suffered a serious knee injury which kept him out of football for six months.

=== Return to Red Star Belgrade ===
After seasons spent in Sion, Mrđa returned to the club at which he debuted professionally, signing a two-year contract with Red Star Belgrade. On 29 September 2013 he scored a hat-trick in a 5–0 win against FK Spartak Subotica. On 23 November 2013 he scored another hat-trick in a 4–1 win against FK Sloboda Užice, becoming Red Star's highest goal-scorer of the half-season.

=== Omiya Ardija ===
On 1 July 2014, Mrđa joined J. League Division 1 club Omiya Ardija. Mrđa scored on his debut on 19 July 2014 helping them to earn a 3–3 draw against Sanfrecce Hiroshima. He played 18 times for Omiya in the 2014 as they suffered relegation to the Division 2.

He finished his career at Slovenian side Olimpija Ljubljana.

== International career ==
Mrđa was a part of the Serbian U21 team that made it to the final of the 2007 UEFA European Under-21 Championship, where he scored coming off the bench against the Netherlands U21 side. By the end of the championship he had scored a total of two goals, which was on level with the likes of Ryan Babel. Mrđa scored two goals for the Serbia national team in a 3–0 friendly win against Japan on 7 April 2010.

In June 2010, he was called up by Radomir Antić to Serbia's squad at the 2010 FIFA World Cup, but didn't make any appearances there.

== Career statistics ==
=== Club ===
Updated to 23 February 2017.

Appearances and goals by club, season and competition
Club	Season	League			Emperor's Cup		J.League Cup		Total	
Club	Season	Division	Apps	Goals	Apps	Goals	Apps	Goals	Apps	Goals
Omiya Ardija	2014	J1 League	18	9	1	0	–		19	9
Omiya Ardija	2015	J2 League	36	19	1	0	–		37	19
Omiya Ardija	2016	J1 League	27	6	2	0	3	0	32	6
Career total			81	34	4	0	3	0	88	34

=== International ===
Serbia national team
Year	Apps	Goals
2008	2	0
2009	0	0
2010	7	2
2011	3	0
2012	0	0
2013	0	0
2014	2	0
Total	14	2

==== International goals ====
#	Date	Venue	Opponent	Score	Result	Competition
1.	7 April 2010	Nagai Stadium, Osaka, Japan	Japan	0–1	0–3	Friendly
2.	7 April 2010	Nagai Stadium, Osaka, Japan	Japan	0–3	0–3	Friendly
