= 2014–15 Red Star Belgrade season =

Red Star Belgrade
2014–15 season
- President: Svetozar Mijailović
- Head coach: Nenad Lalatović
- Stadium: Red Star Stadium
- SuperLiga: 2nd
- Serbian Cup: Second round
- Top goalscorer: League: Darko Lazović (10); All: Darko Lazović (10)
Home colours	Away colours	Third colours

During the 2014–15 season, Red Star competed in the Serbian SuperLiga and the Serbian Cup.

== Competitions ==
=== Overall ===
	Competition	Position
(Serbia)	Serbian Cup	Second Round
(Serbia)	Serbian SuperLiga	2nd

=== Serbian Cup ===
Red Star will participate in the 9th Serbian Cup starting in First Round.

==== Matches ====
24 September 2014 1/16	Red Star	1–0	Borac Čačak	Belgrade
	Despotović 50'			Stadium: Stadion Crvena Zvezda; Attendance: 4,184

29 October 2014 1/8	FK Rad	1–0	Red Star	Belgrade
	Perović 50'			Stadium: Stadion FK Obilić; Attendance: 2,000

=== Serbian SuperLiga ===
The 2014–15 season is Red Star's 9th season in Serbian SuperLiga.

==== Matches ====
9 August 2014 1	Red Star	2–0	Radnički Niš	Belgrade
				Stadium: Stadion Crvena Zvezda; Attendance: 22,332

17 August 2014 2	Red Star	3–0	FK Jagodina	Belgrade
				Stadium: Stadion Crvena Zvezda; Attendance: 12,718

24 August 2014 3	FK Vojvodina	0–1	Red Star	Novi Sad
				Stadium: Karađorđe Stadium; Attendance: 8,000

31 August 2014 4	Red Star	1–0	Spartak Subotica	Belgrade
				Stadium: Stadion Crvena Zvezda; Attendance: 12,650

13 September 2014 5	Napredak Kruševac	0–0	Red Star	Kruševac
				Stadium: Stadium Mladost; Attendance: 4,366

21 September 2014 6	Red Star	2–0	FK Novi Pazar	Belgrade
				Stadium: Stadion Crvena Zvezda; Attendance: 8,000

29 September 2014 7	Borac Čačak	0–1	Red Star	Čačak
				Stadium: Čačak Stadium; Attendance: 3,538

4 October 2014 8	Red Star	2–2	FK Voždovac	Belgrade
				Stadium: Stadion Crvena Zvezda; Attendance: 10,450

18 October 2014 9	FK Partizan	1–0	Red Star	Belgrade
				Stadium: Partizan Stadium; Attendance: 30,812

25 October 2014 10	Red Star	1–0	Donji Srem	Belgrade
				Stadium: Stadion Crvena Zvezda; Attendance: 6,830

2 November 2014 11	FK Rad	1–2	Red Star	Belgrade
				Stadium: King Peter I Attendance: 3,855

8 November 2014 12	Red Star	0–0	FK Čukarički	Belgrade
				Stadium: Stadion Crvena Zvezda; Attendance: 14,000

22 November 2014 13	Radnički Kragujevac	0–0	Red Star	Niš
				Stadium: Čair Stadium; Attendance: 3,076

29 November 2014 14	Red Star	2–1	OFK Beograd	Belgrade
				Stadium: Stadion Crvena Zvezda; Attendance: 9,078

7 December 2014 15	Mladost Lučani	1–1	Red Star	Lučani
				Stadium: Stadion Mladost; Attendance: 4,569

23 February 2015 16	Radnički Niš	0–0	Red Star	Niš
				Stadium: Čair Stadium; Attendance: 4,039

13 March 2015 17	FK Jagodina	2–3	Red Star	Jagodina
				Stadium: Jagodina City Stadium; Attendance: 4,068

7 March 2015 18	Red Star	3–0	FK Vojvodina	Belgrade
				Stadium: Stadion Crvena Zvezda; Attendance: 16,780

14 March 2015 19	Spartak Subotica	1–3	Red Star	Subotica
				Stadium: Subotica City Stadium; Attendance: 3,638

23 March 2015 20	Red Star	1–0	Napredak Kruševac	Belgrade
				Stadium: Stadion Crvena Zvezda; Attendance: 14,640

4 April 2015 21	FK Novi Pazar	2–1	Red Star	Novi Pazar
				Stadium: Novi Pazar City Stadium; Attendance: 0

9 April 2015 22	Red Star	3–1	Borac Čačak	Belgrade
				Stadium: Stadion Crvena Zvezda; Attendance: 7,462

18 April 2015 23	FK Voždovac	0–1	Red Star	Belgrade
				Stadium: Shopping Center Stadium; Attendance: 3,025

25 April 2015 24	Red Star	0–0	FK Partizan	Belgrade
				Stadium: Stadion Crvena Zvezda; Attendance: 44,120

29 April 2015 25	Donji Srem	1–3	Red Star	Novi Sad
				Stadium: Karadjordje Stadium; Attendance: 2,506

3 May 2015 26	Red Star	2–0	FK Rad	Belgrade
				Stadium: Stadion Crvena Zvezda; Attendance: 0

10 May 2015 27	FK Čukarički	2–0	Red Star	Belgrade
				Stadium: Stadion Čukarički; Attendance: 3,337

13 May 2015 28	Red Star	1–2	Radnički Kragujevac	Belgrade
				Stadium: Stadion Crvena Zvezda; Attendance: 2,224

16 May 2015 29	OFK Beograd	2–4	Red Star	Belgrade
				Stadium: Obilic Stadium; Attendance: 3,049

24 May 2015 30	Red Star	3–1	Mladost Lučani	Belgrade
				Stadium: Stadion Crvena Zvezda; Attendance: 6,000

==== League table ====
Pos	Team	Pld	W	D	L	GF	GA	GD	Pts	Qualification or relegation
1	Partizan (C)	30	21	8	1	67	22	+45	71	Qualification for Champions League second qualifying round
2	Red Star Belgrade	30	19	7	4	46	20	+26	64	Qualification for Europa League first qualifying round (Note: Since Čukarički and Partizan got to the 2014–15 Serbian Cup final, the fourth placed team to have qualified for the first qualifying round of the 2015–16 UEFA Europa League)
3	Čukarički	30	16	9	5	48	24	+24	57	Qualification for Europa League first qualifying round
4	Vojvodina	30	16	4	10	44	36	+8	52	Qualification for Europa League first qualifying round
5	Novi Pazar	30	13	8	9	39	28	+11	47	

Source: Serbian SuperLiga
Rules for classification: 1) points; 2) head-to-head points; 3) head-to-head goal difference; 4) head-to-head goals scored; 5) goal difference; 6) number of goals scored.
(C) Champions

==== Results and positions by round ====
Round	1	2	3	4	5	6	7	8	9	10	11	12	13	14	15	16	17	18	19	20	21	22	23	24	25	26	27	28	29	30
Ground	H	H	A	H	A	H	A	H	A	H	A	H	A	H	A	A	A	H	A	H	A	H	A	H	A	H	A	H	A	H
Result	W	W	W	W	D	W	W	D	L	W	W	D	D	W	D	D	W	W	W	W	L	W	W	D	W	W	L	L	W	W
Position	4	2	2	2	2	2	2	3	3	3	2	2	2	2	2	2	2	2	2	2	2	2	2	2	2	2	2	2	2	2

Updated to match(es) played on 24 May 2015. Source: superliga.rs
A = Away; H = Home; W = Win; D = Draw; L = Loss
