= 2013–14 Serbian SuperLiga =

8th season of Serbian SuperLiga

Jelen SuperLiga
- Season: 2013–14
- Champions: Red Star; 2nd SuperLiga Title; 27th domestic title
- Champions League: Partizan
- Europa League: Jagodina; Vojvodina; Čukarički
- Matches: 224
- Goals: 513 (2.29 per match)
- Top goalscorer: Dragan Mrđa (19)
- Biggest home win: Red Star 5–0 Spartak
- Biggest away win: Radnički 1923 0–5 Partizan
- Highest scoring: Partizan 4–3 Novi Pazar
- Longest winning run: Red Star 15 games
- Longest unbeaten run: Red Star 17 games
- Highest attendance: 48,347; Red Star 4–2 OFK Beograd

The 2013–14 Serbian SuperLiga (known as the Jelen SuperLiga for sponsorship reasons) was the eighth season of the Serbian SuperLiga the top tier of league football in Serbia. The title was won by Red Star Belgrade.

== Teams ==
A total of 16 teams contested the league, including 13 sides from the 2012–13 season and two promoted from the 2012–13 Serbian First League, which were the champions FK Napredak Kruševac and second placed FK Čukarički. A few days before the start of the season Hajduk was dissolved, thus leaving an empty spot. The 16th club was then determined to be FK Voždovac, placed 3rd in Serbian First League in 2012-13 season. At the end of the season, the last two teams will be relegated.

=== Stadiums and locations ===
Location of teams in 2012–13 Serbian SuperLiga

All figures for stadiums include seating capacity only, as many stadiums in Serbia have stands without seats which would otherwise depict the actual number of people able to attend football matches not regulated by UEFA or FIFA.

Team	City	Stadium	Capacity
Donji Srem	Pećinci	Karađorđe Stadium	14,458
Čukarički	Belgrade	Stadion Čukarički	4,070
Jagodina	Jagodina	Jagodina City Stadium	15,000
Javor	Ivanjica	Ivanjica Stadium	5,000
Napredak	Kruševac	Stadion Mladost	10,331
Novi Pazar	Novi Pazar	Novi Pazar City Stadium	12,000
OFK Beograd	Belgrade	Omladinski Stadium	19,100
Partizan	Belgrade	Partizan Stadium	32,710
Rad	Belgrade	Stadion Kralj Petar I	6,000
Radnički 1923	Kragujevac	Čika Dača Stadium	15,100
Radnički	Niš	Čair Stadium	18,151
Red Star	Belgrade	Red Star Stadium	55,538
Sloboda	Užice	Begluk Stadium	12,000
Spartak Zlatibor Voda	Subotica	Subotica City Stadium	13,000
Vojvodina	Novi Sad	Karađorđe Stadium	14,458
Voždovac	Belgrade	Shopping Center Stadium	5,200

=== Personnel and kits ===
Note: Flags indicate national team as has been defined under FIFA eligibility rules. Players and Managers may hold more than one non-FIFA nationality.

Team	Head coach	Captain	Kit manufacturer	Shirt sponsor
Donji Srem	(Serbia) Vlado Čapljić	(Serbia) Nemanja Lakić-Pešić	Joma	Industrija Đurđević
Čukarički	(Serbia) Vladan Milojević	(Serbia) Igor Matić	Kappa	ADOC
Jagodina	(Serbia) Mladen Dodić	(Serbia) Ivan Cvetković	Kubba	—
Javor	(Serbia) Slavenko Kuzeljević	(Serbia) Milovan Milović	Jako	Matis
Napredak	(Serbia) Nenad Lalatović	(Serbia) Nemanja Krznarić	Nike	Floridabel
Novi Pazar	(Serbia) Zoran Njeguš	(Serbia) Admir Kecap	Joma	Dragolovčanin / Numanović
OFK Beograd	(Serbia) Zlatko Krmpotić	(Serbia) Nikola Vasiljević	Beltona	DDOR osiguranje
Partizan	(Serbia) Marko Nikolić	(Serbia) Saša Ilić	adidas	Lav pivo
Rad	(Montenegro) Stevan Mojsilović	(Serbia) Branislav Milošević	NAAI	Rubikon
Radnički Kragujevac	(Serbia) Dragoljub Bekvalac	(Serbia) Darko Spalević	Jako	—
Radnički Niš	(Serbia) Milan Milanović	(Serbia) Aleksandar Jovanović	Legea	—
Red Star	(Slovenia) Slaviša Stojanovič	(Serbia) Nenad Milijaš	Puma	Gazprom
Sloboda	(Serbia) Ljubiša Stamenković	(Serbia) Dejan Ranković	Jako	Farmakom / Kvisko
Spartak	(North Macedonia) Dragi Kanatlarovski	(Serbia) Vladimir Torbica	Errea	Zlatibor Voda O2
Vojvodina	(Serbia) Zoran Marić	(Serbia) Igor Đurić	Joma	Volkswagen
Voždovac	(Serbia) Zoran Milinković	(Serbia) Dejan Milovanović	NAAI	—

Nike is the official ball supplier for Serbian SuperLiga.

== Transfers ==
For the list of transfers involving SuperLiga clubs during 2012–13 season, please see: List of Serbian football transfers summer 2013 and List of Serbian football transfers winter 2013-14.

== League table ==
Pos	Team	Pld	W	D	L	GF	GA	GD	Pts	Qualification or relegation
1	Red Star Belgrade (C, D)	30	23	3	4	66	27	+39	72	Excluded from European competitions (Note: Red Star Belgrade, the champions of the 2013–14 Serbian SuperLiga, would have qualified for the Champions League second qualifying round, but was banned by UEFA for breaching UEFA Club Licensing and Financial Fair Play Regulations. As a result, the Partizan, the runners-up of the league, entered the Champions League instead of the Europa League second qualifying round and Jagodina, the third-placed team of the league, entered the Europa League second qualifying round instead of the first qualifying round, and the first qualifying round berth was given to Čukarički, the fifth-placed team of the league.)
2	Partizan (Q)	30	22	5	3	64	20	+44	71	Qualification for Champions League second qualifying round
3	Jagodina (Q)	30	13	9	8	40	30	+10	48	Qualification for Europa League second qualifying round (Note: Vojvodina won the 2013–14 Serbian Cup, therefore qualified for the second qualifying round of the 2014–15 UEFA Europa League)
4	Vojvodina (Q)	30	11	12	7	38	32	+6	45	Qualification for Europa League second qualifying round
5	Čukarički (Q)	30	12	8	10	30	31	−1	44	Qualification for Europa League first qualifying round
6	Radnički	30	10	13	7	28	22	+6	43	
7	Voždovac	30	12	6	12	34	35	−1	42	
8	Novi Pazar	30	11	6	13	32	34	−2	39	
9	Napredak Kruševac	30	9	8	13	42	44	−2	35	
10	Spartak Subotica	30	8	10	12	24	37	−13	34	
11	OFK Beograd	30	10	3	17	31	43	−12	33	
12	Donji Srem	30	7	11	12	29	40	−11	32	
13	Radnički 1923	30	7	11	12	30	49	−19	32	
14	Rad (Q, O)	30	8	5	17	19	37	−18	29	Qualification for play-off
15	Javor Ivanjica (R)	30	6	11	13	29	38	−9	29	Relegation to Serbian First League
16	Sloboda Užice (R)	30	7	7	16	21	38	−17	28	Relegation to Serbian First League

Source: Serbian SuperLiga
Rules for classification: 1) points; 2) head-to-head points; 3) head-to-head goal difference; 4) head-to-head goals scored; 5) goal difference; 6) number of goals scored.
(C) Champions; (D) Disqualified; (O) Play-off winners; (Q) Qualified for the phase indicated; (R) Relegated

== Results ==
All clubs play each other twice, once at home and once away. Giving a total of 30 matches to be played per team.

Home \ Away	ČUK	DSR	JAG	JAV	NAP	NPZ	OFK	PAR	RAD	RKR	RNI	RSB	SUŽ	SPA	VOJ	VŽD
Čukarički		3–1	0–0	2–1	1–0	1–1	1–0	0–1	2–0	0–1	0–0	2–0	1–0	1–1	0–0	2–3
Donji Srem	1–1		1–1	1–1	1–3	2–1	1–1	0–5	2–0	4–1	0–1	0–1	0–0	1–0	1–1	3–0
Jagodina	4–2	2–0		1–1	0–2	1–0	0–2	0–3	3–1	1–0	2–1	0–2	2–0	2–0	3–0	0–0
Javor Ivanjica	0–2	0–0	0–1		4–3	1–0	1–3	0–1	1–2	1–1	1–1	4–2	0–1	0–0	2–1	0–2
Napredak Kruševac	2–1	4–2	2–1	0–0		2–1	3–0	2–0	0–1	3–3	1–1	0–1	3–1	0–0	0–2	1–1
Novi Pazar	0–0	1–0	2–2	2–0	1–1		2–0	0–0	1–0	0–1	1–0	0–1	2–1	3–0	2–0	3–2
OFK Beograd	1–2	0–1	3–2	2–1	2–1	0–1		0–2	1–0	2–3	2–1	1–2	1–0	1–1	0–2	1–0
Partizan	2–0	3–2	2–0	0–0	1–1	4–3	2–0		3–1	5–1	2–1	2–1	1–0	2–0	1–1	5–0
Rad	0–1	0–0	0–2	1–0	1–1	1–0	1–0	2–4		1–0	0–2	0–1	0–0	2–1	1–2	0–2
Radnički 1923	0–1	2–0	1–1	3–3	2–1	2–0	1–3	0–5	2–1		0–0	0–2	1–1	0–0	1–1	1–1
Radnički	1–0	1–1	1–1	1–1	1–0	2–0	2–1	0–0	1–1	2–0		1–1	2–0	2–1	1–1	2–1
Red Star Belgrade	4–1	2–2	2–1	2–1	4–1	5–1	4–2	1–0	2–0	1–0	2–0		4–1	5–0	2–1	5–1
Sloboda Užice	1–2	0–1	0–4	0–1	2–1	0–0	2–2	1–2	1–0	2–1	0–0	0–2		1–1	1–2	0–1
Spartak Subotica	3–0	2–1	1–1	0–2	3–2	3–2	1–0	1–4	0–0	0–0	1–0	1–2	0–1		1–1	1–0
Vojvodina	1–1	0–0	0–1	2–2	3–1	2–1	2–0	2–1	0–1	2–2	1–0	3–3	1–2	1–0		2–0
Voždovac	2–0	3–0	1–1	1–0	3–1	0–1	1–0	0–1	2–1	5–0	0–0	1–0	0–2	0–1	1–1	

Source: Serbian SuperLiga
Legend: Blue = home team win; Yellow = draw; Red = away team win.

== Play-off ==
Team 1	Agg.	Team 2	1st leg	2nd leg
Metalac	0 – 3	Rad	0 – 0	0 – 3 (W.O.)

^{* Metalac refused to play second leg due to severe crowd disturbance in the first leg, caused by Rad fans.}

== Awards ==
=== Top scorers ===
Sources: Superliga official website, soccerway.com

Pos	Scorer	Team	Goals
1	(Serbia) Dragan Mrđa	Red Star	19
2	(Serbia) Aleksandar Pešić	Jagodina	13
3	(Serbia) Aleksandar Čavrić	OFK	12
4	(Nigeria) Abiola Dauda	Red Star	11
4	(Serbia) Nenad Mirosavljević	Napredak / Čukarički	11
4	(Serbia) Petar Škuletić	Vojvodina / Partizan	11

=== Hat-tricks ===
Player	For	Against	Result	Date
(Serbia) Dragan Mrđa	Red Star	Spartak	5–0	29 September 2013
(Serbia) Dragan Mrđa	Red Star	Sloboda	4–1	23 November 2013
(Serbia) Nikola Trujić	Napredak	Radnički Kragujevac	3–3	1 March 2014
(Serbia) Darko Lazović	Red Star	Čukarički	4–1	12 April 2014
(Serbia) Aleksandar Pešić	Jagodina	Sloboda	4–0	26 April 2014
(Serbia) Nemanja Kojić	Partizan	Donji Srem	0–5	3 May 2014

=== Team of the Season ===
Position	Player	Team
GK	(Serbia) Milan Lukač	Partizan
DR	(Serbia) Miroslav Vulićević	Partizan
DC	(Serbia) Srđan Babić	Vojvodina
DC	(Serbia) Bogdan Planić	OFK Beograd
DL	(Serbia) Nikola Mijailović	Red Star Belgrade
MD	(Serbia) Nemanja Radoja	Vojvodina
MR	(Serbia) Darko Lazović	Red Star Belgrade
MC	(Montenegro) Nikola Drinčić	Partizan
ML	(Serbia) Mijat Gaćinović	Vojvodina
FW	(Serbia) Aleksandar Pešić	Jagodina
FW	(Serbia) Dragan Mrđa	Red Star Belgrade
