= 2010–11 Red Star Belgrade season =

Red Star Belgrade
2010–11 season
- President: (Serbia) Vladan Lukić
- Head coach: (Serbia) Ratko Dostanić (until 6 August) (Serbia) Aleksandar Kristić (from 6 August until 9 December) (Croatia) Robert Prosinečki (from 9 December)
- Stadium: Stadion Crvena Zvezda
- SuperLiga: 2nd
- Serbian Cup: Semi-finals
- UEFA Europa League: Third qualifying round
- Top goalscorer: League: Andrija Kaluđerović (13); All: Andrija Kaluđerović (20)
- Highest home attendance: 41,682 (vs Partizan, 6 April 2011)
- Lowest home attendance: 4,500 (vs Hajduk Kula, 1 May 2011)
- Average home league attendance: 15,695
Home colours	Away colours	Third colours

In season 2010-11 Red Star Belgrade will be competing in Serbian SuperLiga, Serbian Cup and UEFA Europa League.

== Previous season positions ==
The club competed in Serbian SuperLiga, Serbian Cup in domestic and UEFA Europa League in European competitions. Finishing 2nd in domestic league, behind FK Partizan, winning domestic cup by defeating FK Vojvodina in final match, and losing to Czech champion Slavia Prague in play off for UEFA Europa League.

	Competition	Position
(European Union)	UEFA Europa League	Play-off round
(Serbia)	Serbian SuperLiga	2nd
(Serbia)	Serbian Cup	Winner

For winning in the domestic cup team qualified for this year's UEFA Europa League.

== Players ==
=== Squad statistics ===
Nation	No.	Player	SuperLiga		Serbian Cup		Europa League		Total		Discipline	
Nation	No.	Player	Apps.		Apps.		Apps.		Apps.		Yellow card	Red card
Goalkeepers
(Montenegro) ^{1}	1	Boban Bajković	10	0	1	0	0	0	11	0	1	0
(Serbia)	22	Saša Stamenković	20	0	4	0	2	0	26	0	1	0
(Serbia)	31	Marko Dmitrović	0	0	0	0	0	0	0	0	0	0
Defenders
(Serbia)	3	Duško Tošić	25	1	3	0	2	0	30	1	8	0
(Serbia)	4	Uroš Spajić	0	0	1	0	0	0	1	0	0	0
(Serbia)	5	Uroš Ćosić	8	1	2	0	0	0	10	1	1	0
(Ghana)	13	Lee Addy	19	0	2	0	0	0	21	0	4	0
(Serbia)	14	Nikola Mikić	16	1	4	0	0	0	20	1	4	0
(Serbia)	15	Milan Vilotić	10	0	2	0	2	0	14	0	5	0
(Montenegro) ^{1}	16	Stevan Reljić	10	2	0	0	0	0	10	2	5	1
(Serbia)	24	Pavle Ninkov	23	1	5	0	2	0	30	1	5	0
(Serbia)	25	Danijel Mihajlović	3	0	1	0	0	0	4	0	0	0
Midfielders
(Serbia)	7	Milan Jeremić	1	0	0	0	2	0	3	0	0	0
(Serbia)	8	Darko Lazović	16	2	3	0	0	0	19	2	1	0
(Serbia)	9	Ognjen Koroman	23	2	3	0	2	0	28	2	6	0
(Brazil)	10	Evandro Goebel	9	5	2	0	0	0	11	5	0	0
(Serbia)	17	Vladan Binić	0	0	0	0	0	0	0	0	0	0
(Brazil)	20	Cadú	26	5	5	0	2	1	33	6	9	0
(Ghana)	26	Mohammed-Awal Issah	26	0	4	1	1	0	31	1	8	0
(Serbia)	27	Srđan Mijailović	13	0	2	0	0	0	15	0	3	0
(Montenegro) ^{1}	29	Marko Vešović	24	2	3	0	2	0	29	2	4	0
(Serbia)	55	Slavoljub Srnić	1	0	1	0	0	0	2	0	0	0
(Serbia)	88	Dejan Milovanović	18	3	3	1	2	0	23	4	6	0
Forwards
(Colombia)	19	Cristian Borja	14	3	2	0	0	0	16	3	3	0
(Serbia)	21	Aleksandar Jevtić	22	2	4	0	2	0	28	2	1	0
(Serbia)	23	Slavko Perović	12	2	0	0	1	0	13	2	0	0
(Serbia)	99	Andrija Kaluđerović	28	13	5	7	0	0	33	20	2	0
Players sold or loaned out during the season
(Brazil)	2	Sávio	9	1	1	0	0	0	10	1	2	0
(Serbia)	6	Nikola Ignjatijević	6	0	3	0	0	0	9	0	1	1
(Serbia)	11	Miloš Trifunović	15	6	3	0	2	1	20	7	2	0
(Serbia)	18	Slavoljub Đorđević	7	0	0	0	2	0	9	0	2	1
(Azerbaijan) ^{1}	19	Branimir Subašić	0	0	0	0	1	0	1	0	0	0
(Serbia)	32	Vladimir Bogdanović	5	0	1	0	1	0	7	0	0	0
Updated 29 May 2011

1 These players also hold Serbian citizenship.

=== Player transfer ===
==== In ====
No.	Pos.	Player	Moving from	Fee	Transfer Window
-	MF	(Serbia) Nenad Srećković	(Serbia) Mladi Radnik	Loan return	Summer
-	MF	(Serbia) Nemanja Obrić	(Serbia) Mladi Radnik	Loan return	Summer
17	MF	(Serbia) Vladan Binić	(Serbia) Napredak Kruševac	Undisclosed	Summer
29	MF	(Montenegro) Marko Vešović	(Montenegro) Budućnost Podgorica	Undisclosed	Summer
9	MF	(Serbia) Ognjen Koroman	(South Korea) Incheon United	Free	Summer
3	DF	(Serbia) Duško Tošić	(England) Portsmouth F.C.	Free	Summer
88	MF	(Serbia) Dejan Milovanović	(France) RC Lens	Loan	Summer
99	FW	(Serbia) Andrija Kaluđerović	(Serbia) FK Rad	Undisclosed	Summer
25	DF	(Serbia) Danijel Mihajlović	(Serbia) FK Jagodina	Undisclosed	Summer
13	DF	(Ghana) Lee Addy	(Ghana) Bechem Chelsea	Undisclosed	Summer
10	MF	(Brazil) Evandro Goebel	(Brazil) Atlético Paranaense	Undisclosed	Winter
19	FW	(Colombia) Cristian Borja	(Brazil) Caxias do Sul	Loan	Winter
5	DF	(Serbia) Uroš Ćosić	(Russia) CSKA Moscow	Loan	Winter
-	DF	(Serbia) Jovan Krneta	(Serbia) Partizan	Free	Winter

==== Out ====
Pos.	Player	Moving to	Fee	Transfer Window
GK	(Serbia) Ivan Ranđelović	Unattached	Free	Summer
GK	(Serbia) Saša Radivojević	(Serbia) Čukarički	Free	Summer
MF	(Serbia) Nikola Lazetić	(Serbia) Vojvodina	Free	Summer
FW	(Serbia) Dejan Lekić	(Spain) Osasuna	2.6M €	Summer
FW	(North Macedonia) Ivan Tričkovski	(Cyprus) APOEL	400K €	Summer
DF	(Bosnia and Herzegovina) Ognjen Vranješ	(Moldova) Sheriff Tiraspol	Loan	Summer
MF	(Ecuador) Segundo Castillo	(Ecuador) Deportivo Quito	Undisclosed	Summer
DF	(Serbia) Vujadin Savić	(France) Bordeaux	1.2M €	Summer
FW	(Serbia) Miloš Reljić	(Serbia) BSK Borča	Loan	Summer
MF	(Montenegro) Marko Mugoša	(Montenegro) Budućnost Podgorica	Loan	Summer
MF	(Montenegro) Nemanja Nikolić	(Serbia) Spartak Subotica	Loan	Summer
MF	(Serbia) Nenad Srećković	(Serbia) Napredak Kruševac	Loan	Summer
MF	(Serbia) Nemanja Obrić	(Hungary) Szombathelyi Haladás	Undisclosed	Summer
FW	(Azerbaijan) Branimir Subašić	(Azerbaijan) Gabala	Undisclosed	Summer
DF	(Bosnia and Herzegovina) Ognjen Vranješ	(Russia) Krasnodar	200K €	Winter
DF	(Serbia) Andrej Mrkela	(Serbia) Rad	Loan	Winter
MF	(Serbia) Marko Blažić	(Slovakia) Ružomberok	Free	Winter
DF	(Serbia) Bojan Đorđević	(Serbia) Novi Pazar	Loan	Winter
MF	(Montenegro) Marko Mugoša	(Serbia) Jagodina	Loan	Winter
MF	(Brazil) Sávio Oliveira do Vale	(China) Changchun Yatai	Loan	Winter
DF	(Serbia) Nikola Ignjatijević	(Romania) Politehnica Timișoara	Loan	Winter
DF	(Serbia) Slavoljub Đorđević	(Uzbekistan) Bunyodkor	Undisclosed	Winter
FW	(Serbia) Miloš Trifunović	(Uzbekistan) Bunyodkor	Loan	Winter
MF	(Serbia) Vladimir Bogdanović	(China) Liaoning Whowin	Undisclosed	Winter

== Competitions ==
=== Serbian SuperLiga ===
Red Star Belgrade competed with 15 other teams in the 5th season of Serbian SuperLiga. They finished second, for a second time in a row, behind Partizan

Pos	Team	Pld	W	D	L	GF	GA	GD	Pts	Qualification or relegation
1	Partizan (C)	30	24	4	2	75	21	+54	76	Qualification for Champions League second qualifying round
2	Red Star Belgrade	30	22	4	4	52	18	+34	70	Qualification for Europa League third qualifying round (Note: Partizan won the 2010–11 Serbian Cup against Vojvodina. Since both teams will achieve a spot for the European competitions via their final placement, the allocation of the 2011–12 UEFA Europa League spots will be based on final league positions, with the fourth-placed team also qualifying for the competition.)
3	Vojvodina	30	20	7	3	44	14	+30	67	Qualification for Europa League second qualifying round
4	Rad	30	14	10	6	38	21	+17	52	Qualification for Europa League first qualifying round
5	Spartak Zlatibor Voda	30	11	10	9	34	27	+7	43	

Source: SuperLiga
Rules for classification: 1) points; 2) head-to-head points; 3) head-to-head goal difference; 4) head-to-head goals scored; 5) goal difference; 6) number of goals scored.
(C) Champions

==== Results ====
Kickoff times are in CET.

14 August 2010 Round 1	Smederevo	0 – 0	Red Star	Smederevo, Serbia
17:30	Atanacković (yellow card) 05'; Stanić (yellow card) 58'; Lukić (yellow card) 60'; Ognjanović (yellow card) 64'; Živković (yellow card) 67'	Report	(yellow card) 77' Vilotić	Stadium: Stadion FK Smederevo; Attendance: 6,500; Referee: Miodrag Gogić

21 August 2010 Round 2	Inđija	0 – 1	Red Star	Inđija, Serbia
17:00	Dubljević (yellow card) 14'; Čovilo (yellow card) 38'; Anđelković (yellow card) 90'	Report	07' Trifunović; (yellow card) 22' Ignjatijević	Stadium: Stadion FK Inđija; Attendance: 4,500; Referee: Dejan Dimitrijević

28 August 2010 Round 3	Red Star	2 – 1	Jagodina	Belgrade, Serbia
19:00	Ninkov (yellow card) 23'; Kaluđerović 28'; Issah (yellow card) 26'; Milovanović (yellow card) 42'; Cadú 72'	Report	(yellow card) 03' Bojović; (yellow card) 49' Protić; 56' Đenić; (yellow card) 56' Đenić; (yellow card) 69' Bondžulić	Stadium: Stadion Crvena Zvezda; Attendance: 15,000; Referee: Vlado Glođović

11 September 2010 Round 4	BSK Borča	1 – 3	Red Star	Borča, Belgrade, Serbia
16:30	Milošević (yellow card) 21'; Knežević 69'; Alivodić (yellow card) 89'	Report	(yellow card) 36' (goal) 40', 58' Trifunović; 89' Vešović	Stadium: Stadion Borča; Attendance: 5,000; Referee: Dragan Krstić

18 September 2010 Round 5	Red Star	1 – 0	Javor	Belgrade, Serbia
19:00	Milovanović (yellow card) 56'; Ninkov (yellow card) 90'; Kaluđerović 92' (yellow card) 93'; Tošić (yellow card) 97'	Report	(yellow card) 55' (yellow-red card) 69' Stanisavljević; (yellow card) 86' Milovanović; (yellow card) 88' Dragović; (yellow card) 90' Mališić	Stadium: Stadion Crvena Zvezda; Attendance: 12,847; Referee: Dejan Santrač

25 September 2010 Round 6	Čukarički	0 – 1	Red Star	Belgrade, Serbia
16:00	Radivojević (yellow card) 39'; Krčmarević (yellow card) 40'; Rnić (yellow card) 68'	Report	31' (yellow card) 34' Milovanović; (yellow card) 67' Vešović	Stadium: Čukarički Stadion; Attendance: 3,000; Referee: Milan Jeremić

2 October 2010 Round 7	Red Star	2 – 0	Metalac G.M.	Belgrade, Serbia
18:00	Cadú (yellow card) 34' (goal) 56'; Kaluđerović 13'; Mikić (yellow card) 34'	Report	(yellow card) 29' Nikolić; (yellow card) 33' Betoligar; (yellow card) 57' Bogunović; (yellow card) 70' Bajić	Stadium: Stadion Crvena Zvezda; Attendance: 11,344; Referee: Srđan Kaurin

16 October 2010 Round 8	Sloboda Point Sevojno	0 – 3	Red Star	Užice, Serbia
15:00	Radosavljević (yellow card) 19'; Bulatović (yellow card) 44'; Lazić (yellow card) 57'; Vukajlović (yellow card) 73'; Mihailović (yellow card) 80'	Report	(yellow card) 21' Issah; (yellow card) 41' Đorđević; 44' Trifunović; 50' Sávio; 86' Kaluđerović	Stadium: Stadion FK Sloboda; Attendance: 5,000; Referee: Danilo Grujić

23 October 2010 Round 9	Red Star	0 – 1	Partizan	Belgrade, Serbia
13:00	Tošić (yellow card) 57'	Report	05' Moreira; (yellow card) 51' Stojković; (yellow card) 69' Ilić; (yellow card) 90' Babović	Stadium: Stadion Crvena Zvezda; Attendance: 31,135; Referee: Slobodan Veselinović

30 October 2010 Round 10	Hajduk Kula	2 – 0	Red Star	Kula, Serbia
13:00	Kovačević 13'; Radanović (yellow card) 35'; Maksimović (yellow card) 43'; Pauljević (yellow card) 74'; Petrović (yellow card) 83' (goal) 86'	Report	(yellow card) 10' Ninkov; (yellow card) 18' Issah; (yellow card) 48' Addy; (yellow card) 69' Cadú; (yellow card) 72' Tošić; (yellow card) 90' Trifunović	Stadium: Stadion Hajduk; Attendance: 1,000; Referee: Danilo Mihajlović

6 November 2010 Round 11	Red Star	1 – 0	OFK Beograd	Belgrade, Serbia
18:15	Trifunović 14'; Issah (yellow card) 26'; Sávio (yellow card) 89'	Report	(yellow card) 21' Marković	Stadium: Stadion Crvena Zvezda; Attendance: 9,850; Referee: Dejan Filipović

14 November 2010 Round 12	Rad	0 – 1	Red Star	Belgrade, Serbia
13:00	Jovanović (yellow card) 44'; Kojić (yellow card) 82'; Borjan (yellow card) 89'	Report	(yellow card) 10' (yellow-red card) 58' Reljić; (yellow card) 21' Ninkov; 61' Trifunović; (yellow card) 82' Sávio	Stadium: Stadion Kralj Petar I Attendance: 3,000; Referee: Majo Vujović

21 November 2010 Round 13	Red Star	2 – 0	Borac Čačak	Belgrade, Serbia
18:00	Koroman (yellow card) 20'; Cadú 40'; Milovanović 56' (yellow card) 57'	Report	(yellow card) 22' Jeremić; (yellow card) 25' Kamberović; (yellow card) 34' Marić	Stadium: Stadion Crvena Zvezda; Attendance: 7,985; Referee: Bojan Stojanović

28 November 2010 Round 14	Spartak Zlatibor Voda	1 – 2	Red Star	Subotica, Serbia
13:00	Simović (yellow card) 41'; Milanković (yellow card) 41'; Mirić (yellow card) 41'; Nikolić (yellow card) 70'; Ubiparip 74'; Adamović (yellow card) 88'; Crnoglavac (yellow card) 90'	Report	(yellow card) 14' Issah; (yellow card) 41' (goal) 82' Kaluđerović; (yellow card) 41' Mikić; (red card) 75' Ignjatijević; (yellow card) 76' Addy; 81' Koroman; (yellow card) 82' Tošić	Stadium: Subotica City Stadium; Attendance: 3,000; Referee: Danilo Grujić

4 December 2010 Round 15	Red Star	2 – 2	Vojvodina	Belgrade, Serbia
18:00	Kaluđerović 51'; Reljić 62'; Vešović (yellow card) 82'; Koroman (yellow card) 88'; Stamenković (yellow card) 88'	Report	(yellow card) 51' Merebashvili; 73' Antwi; 80' Oumarou; (yellow card) 88' Vulićević	Stadium: Stadion Crvena Zvezda; Attendance: 13,890; Referee: Slobodan Veselinović

5 March 2011 Round 16	Red Star	1 – 0	Smederevo	Belgrade, Serbia
18:00	Cadú 45' (pen.) (yellow card) 58'; Ćosić (yellow card) 67'; Reljić (yellow card) 78'	Report	(yellow card) 4' Ognjanović; (yellow card) 81' Ćeran	Stadium: Stadion Crvena Zvezda; Attendance: 18,742; Referee: Miodrag Gogić

9 March 2011 Round 17	Red Star	3 – 1	Inđija	Belgrade, Serbia
18:00	Ninkov 37'; Issah (yellow card) 42'; Koroman (yellow card) 42' (goal) 59'; Vešović 90'	Report	(yellow card) 4' Joksimović; (yellow card) 56' Tanasijević; 78' Jakšić	Stadium: Stadion Crvena Zvezda; Attendance: 16,820; Referee: Igor Paunović

12 March 2011 Round 18	Jagodina	0 – 2	Red Star	Jagodina, Serbia
13:00	Vasiljević (yellow card) 22'; Projić (yellow card) 31'; Đilas (yellow card) 65'	Report	14' Jevtić; (yellow card) 40' Mikić; 45' Evandro; (yellow card) 46' Vešović; (yellow card) 59' Mijailović; (yellow card) 73' Koroman	Stadium: Stadion FK Jagodina; Attendance: 12,200; Referee: Srđan Kaurin

20 March 2011 Round 19	Red Star	4 – 1	BSK Borča	Belgrade, Serbia
19:00	Evandro 34', 43'; Borja 71'; Kaluđerović 81'	Report	51' Babić	Stadium: Stadion Crvena Zvezda; Attendance: 8,514; Referee: Milan Jeremić

2 April 2011 Round 20	Javor	0 – 2	Red Star	Ivanjica, Serbia
13:00	Ostojić (yellow card) 57'; Luković (red card) 82'; Stojaković (yellow card) 85'	Report	(yellow card) 16' Bajković; (yellow card) 20' Tošić; (yellow card) 24' Cadú; 33' Jevtić; 45' Kaluđerović; (yellow card) 79' Mijailović	Stadium: Ivanjica Stadium; Attendance: 2,500; Referee: Dejan Santrač

9 April 2011 Round 21	Red Star	4 – 0	Čukarički	Belgrade, Serbia
18:00	Perović 17', 21'; Evandro 72' (pen.); Borja 79'	Report	(yellow card) 71' Žižić	Stadium: Stadion Crvena Zvezda; Attendance: 11,000; Referee: Robert Kiščepegi

16 April 2011 Round 22	Metalac G.M.	0 – 1	Red Star	Kragujevac, Serbia
14:00	Bajić (yellow card) 64'; Krnjinac (yellow card) 73'; Bogunović (yellow card) 74'	Report	(yellow card) 80' Cadú; 82' Mikić	Stadium: Stadion Čika Dača; Attendance: 10,000; Referee: Majo Vujović

20 April 2011 Round 23	Red Star	5 – 1	Sloboda Point Sevojno	Belgrade, Serbia
18:00	Ćosić 29'; Lazović 55'; Kaluđerović 65'; Borja 77'; Addy (yellow card) 88'; Evandro 93'	Report	(yellow card) 27' Šunjevarić; 35' Lazić; (yellow card) 61' Vasilić	Stadium: Stadion Crvena Zvezda; Attendance: 15,520; Referee: Danilo Mihajlović

23 April 2011 Round 24	Partizan	1 – 0	Red Star	Belgrade, Serbia
18:30	Smiljanić (yellow card) 13'; Medo (yellow card) 37'; Tagoe 62' (yellow card) 64'; Tomić (yellow card) 68'; Petrović (yellow card) 86'; Stojković (yellow card) 89'; Jovanović (yellow card) 90'	Report	(yellow card) 9' Borja; (yellow card) 21' Tošić; (yellow card) 55' Cadú; (yellow card) 77' Ninkov	Stadium: Stadion FK Partizan; Attendance: 20,000; Referee: Slobodan Veselinović

1 May 2011 Round 25	Red Star	3 – 1	Hajduk Kula	Belgrade, Serbia
18:00	Milovanović 45'; Reljić 61' (yellow card) 80'; Borja (yellow card) 64'; Vilotić (yellow card) 71'; Kaluđerović 77'; Vešović (yellow card) 87'	Report	25' Jovanović; (yellow card) 51' Đukić; (yellow card) 63' Kasalica; (yellow card) 88' Komazec	Stadium: Stadion Crvena Zvezda; Attendance: 4,500; Referee: Dejan Dimitrijević

7 May 2011 Round 26	OFK Beograd	0 – 0	Red Star	Belgrade, Serbia
15:00	Trivunović (yellow card) 31'; Šaranov (yellow card) 90'	Report	(yellow card) 67' Vilotić	Stadium: Omladinski Stadium; Attendance: 5,000; Referee: Milan Karadžić

15 May 2011 Round 27	Red Star	2 – 1	Rad	Belgrade, Serbia
18:00	Cadú 19'; Kaluđerović 89'	Report	(yellow card) 31' (goal) 90' Jovančić	Stadium: Stadion Crvena Zvezda; Attendance: 18,252; Referee: Dejan Filipović

21 May 2011 Round 28	Borac Čačak	2 – 0	Red Star	Čačak, Serbia
15:00	Petronijević (yellow card) 40'; Krasić (yellow card) 47'; Knežević 69'; Kostić 87' (pen.); Tomašević (red card) 90'	Report	(yellow card) 81' Vilotić; (yellow card) 86' Addy; (yellow card) 89' Mijailović	Stadium: Čačak Stadium; Attendance: 4,000; Referee: Danilo Grujić

25 May 2011 Round 29	Red Star	2 – 2	Spartak Zlatibor Voda	Belgrade, Serbia
17:00	Kaluđerović 65'; Cadú (yellow card) 74'; Tošić 83'; Mikić (yellow card) 90'	Report	(yellow card) 19' Milanković; 47', 57' Nosković; (yellow card) 51' Puškarić; (yellow card) 90' Aleksić	Stadium: Stadion Crvena Zvezda; Attendance: 8,800; Referee: Darko Bogdanović

29 May 2011 Round 30	Vojvodina	0 – 2	Red Star	Novi Sad, Serbia
17:00	Vulićević (yellow card) 54'; Mitošević (yellow card) 74'; Antwi (yellow card) 84'	Report	(yellow card) 36' Reljić; 54' Lazović; (yellow card) 58' Borja; (yellow card) 62' Cadú; 72' Kaluđerović	Stadium: Stadion Karađorđe; Attendance: 10,000; Referee: Dejan Dimitrijević

=== Serbian Cup ===
Red Star Belgrade participated in the 5th Serbian Cup starting in the Round of 32. They were eliminated in Semi final by Partizan.

==== Round of 32 ====
22 September 2010 R32	Sloga Kraljevo	0 – 2	Red Star	Kraljevo, Serbia
15:30	Vasilić (yellow card) 37'; Memedović (yellow card) 37'	Report	(yellow card) 37' Milovanović; (yellow card) 37' Tošić; 90', 92' Kaluđerović	Stadium: Gradski stadion Attendance: 4,500; Referee: Danilo Mihajlović

==== Round of 16 ====
27 October 2010 R16	Red Star	4 – 0	Borac Čačak	Belgrade, Serbia
18:00	Milovanović 11'; Kaluđerović 45', 84'; Lazović (yellow card) 46'; Issah (yellow card) 52' (goal) 63'	Report		Stadium: Stadion Crvena Zvezda; Attendance: 4,823; Referee: Majo Vujović

==== Quarter final ====
10 November 2010 QF	Red Star	2 – 1	Teleoptik	Belgrade, Serbia
18:00	Kaluđerović 48', 90'; Koroman (yellow card) 63'	Report	22' Antelj	Stadium: Stadion Crvena Zvezda; Attendance: 6,683; Referee: Dejan Dimitrijević

==== Semi final ====
16 March 2011 SF	Partizan	2 – 0	Red Star	Belgrade, Serbia
17:00	Tagoe 4', 49' (yellow card); Smiljanić (yellow card); Babović (yellow card); Krstajić (yellow card); Stojković (yellow card)		(yellow card) Koroman; (yellow card) Tošić; (yellow card) Vilotić; (yellow card) Cadú	Stadium: Stadion FK Partizan; Attendance: 25,000; Referee: Milan Karadžić

6 April 2011 SF	Red Star	1–0 (1–2 agg.)	Partizan	Belgrade, Serbia
17:00	Kaluđerović 72'		(yellow card) 27' Petrović; (yellow card) 89' S. Ilić	Stadium: Stadion FK Crvena zvezda Attendance: 41,682; Referee: Slobodan Veselinović

=== UEFA Europa League ===
By winning in the 2009-10 Serbian Cup, Red Star Belgrade qualified for the Europa League. They started in the third qualifying round and were immediately by Slovak side Slovan Bratislava.

==== Third qualifying round ====
29 July 2010 QR3	Red Star (Serbia)	1 – 2	(Slovakia) Slovan Bratislava	Belgrade, Serbia
20:30	Jevtić (yellow card) 13'; Trifunović 63'; Djordjević (yellow card) 66'	Report	(yellow card) 13' (goal) 66' Saláta; 43' Ivana; (yellow card) 45' Dosoudil; (yellow card) 47' Božić	Stadium: Stadion Crvena Zvezda; Attendance: 40,826; Referee: Manuel de Sousa (Portugal)

5 August 2010 QR3	Slovan Bratislava (Slovakia)	1 – 1 (3 – 2 agg.)	(Serbia) Red Star	Bratislava, Slovakia
20:30	Đorđević 2' (o.g.); Grendel (yellow card) 19'; Božić (yellow card) 21'; Sylvestr (yellow card) 31'; Had (yellow card) 51'; Dosoudil (red card) 51'; Kiss (yellow card) 74'	Report	(yellow card) 49' Milovanović; (red card) 51' Djordjević; (yellow card) 60' Issah; 73' Cadú	Stadium: Štadión Pasienky; Attendance: 9,250; Referee: Markus Strömbergsson (Sweden)
