= 2009–10 Red Star Belgrade season =

Red Star Belgrade
2009–10 season
- Chairman: (Serbia) Vladan Lukić
- Manager: (Serbia) Vladimir Petrović (until 21 March) (Serbia) Ratko Dostanić (from 21 March)
- Serbian SuperLiga: 2nd
- Serbian Cup: Winners
- UEFA Europa League: Play-off round
- Top goalscorer: League: Dejan Lekić (12); All: Dejan Lekić (17)

During the 2009–10 season, the Serbian football club Red Star Belgrade won the Serbian Cup after a 3–0 win against Vojvodina. There were numerous transfers of players into and out of the team.

== Squad ==
Note: Flags indicate national team as defined under FIFA eligibility rules; some limited exceptions apply. Players may hold more than one non-FIFA nationality.

No.	Pos.	Nation	Player
1	GK	MNE	Boban Bajković
2	MF	BRA	Sávio
5	DF	SRB	Bojan Đorđević
6	DF	SRB	Nikola Ignjatijević
7	MF	SRB	Milan Jeremić
8	MF	SRB	Darko Lazović
9	FW	SRB	Dejan Lekić
10	MF	MNE	Marko Mugoša
11	FW	SRB	Miloš Trifunović
14	DF	SRB	Nikola Mikić
15	DF	SRB	Milan Vilotić
16	DF	MNE	Stevan Reljić
17	MF	SRB	Nikola Lazetić
18	DF	SRB	Slavoljub Đorđević

No.	Pos.	Nation	Player
19	DF	SRB	Nemanja Cvetković
20	MF	BRA	Cadú
21	FW	SRB	Aleksandar Jevtić
22	GK	SRB	Saša Stamenković
23	FW	SRB	Slavko Perović
24	DF	SRB	Pavle Ninkov
25	MF	SRB	Marko Blažić
26	MF	GHA	Mohammed-Awal Issah
28	DF	SRB	Vujadin Savić
29	FW	SRB	Miloš Reljić
30	MF	MNE	Nemanja Nikolić
32	MF	SRB	Vladimir Bogdanović
33	GK	SRB	Bojan Pavlović
34	MF	SRB	Aleksa Vučinić
99	FW	AZE	Branimir Subašić

== Transfers ==
=== Transfers in ===
Note: Flags indicate national team as defined under FIFA eligibility rules; some limited exceptions apply. Players may hold more than one non-FIFA nationality.

No.	Pos.	Nation	Player
21	FW	SRB	Aleksandar Jevtić (From (Turkey) Hacettepe SK, was on loan in OFK Belgrade)
23	FW	SRB	Slavko Perović (Loan return from FK Napredak Kruševac)
28	DF	SRB	Vujadin Savić (Loan return from Rad Belgrade)
2	MF	BRA	Sávio (From (Montenegro) FK Zeta)
20	MF	BRA	Cadú (From (Montenegro) FK Zeta)
8	MF	SRB	Darko Lazović (From Borac Čačak)
7	MF	SRB	Nemanja Obrić (From (Hungary) Kaposvári Rákóczi FC)
3	DF	SRB	Nikola Ignjatijević (From FK Javor)
18	DF	SRB	Slavoljub Đorđević (From (Austria) SCR Altach)
9	FW	SRB	Dejan Lekić (From FK Zemun)
16	MF	SRB	Nenad Srećković (Loan return from Srem S.Mitrovica)
15	DF	SRB	Milan Vilotić (From FK Čukarički)
19	DF	SRB	Nemanja Cvetković (From (Belgium) UR Namur)
21	DF	BIH	Nikola Vasiljević (From (Ukraine) Metalurh Zaporizhzhia)

=== Transfers out ===
Note: Flags indicate national team as defined under FIFA eligibility rules; some limited exceptions apply. Players may hold more than one non-FIFA nationality.

No.	Pos.	Nation	Player
-	DF	SRB	Nino Pekarić (Loan return to (Romania) Dinamo Bucharest)
-	FW	BRA	Cleo (Loan return to (Portugal) C.D. Olivais e Moscavide, to Partizan Belgrade)
-	MF	SVN	Mirnes Šišić (released)
-	DF	SRB	Ivan Gvozdenović (released, to FK Vojvodina)
-	MF	SRB	Ognjen Koroman (To (South Korea) Incheon United)
-	DF	POL	Grzegorz Bronowicki (released, To (Poland) Górnik Łęczna)
-	DF	SRB	Nemanja Pejčinović (Loan return to Rad Belgrade, to Hertha Berlin)
-	FW	BRA	Josiesley Ferreira (released, to (Brazil) Náutico)
-	MF	SRB	Nenad Milijaš (To (England) Wolverhampton Wanderers)
-	DF	SRB	Nenad Tomović (To (Italy) Genoa)
-	FW	RSA	Bernard Parker (To (Netherlands) FC Twente, was on loan from (South Africa) Thanda Royal Zulu)
-	DF	BRA	Jeff Silva (Released)
-	MF	ECU	Segundo Castillo (To (England) Wolverhampton Wanderers, was on loan in (England) Everton FC)
-	MF	SRB	Nikola Trajković (released, was on loan in (Greece) Thrasyvoulos F.C.)
-	FW	COD	Ibrahim Some Salombo (To (Belgium) FCV Dender)
-	FW	MNE	Igor Burzanović (Loan return from (Montenegro) FK Budućnost Podgorica, to (Japan) Nagoya Grampus Eight)
-	FW	MKD	Ivan Tričkovski (On loan to (Cyprus) Enosis Paralimni)
-	FW	CMR	Aboubakar Oumarou (On loan to OFK Belgrade)

== Competitions ==
=== Serbian SuperLiga ===
Pos	Team	Pld	W	D	L	GF	GA	GD	Pts	Qualification or relegation
1	Partizan (C)	30	24	6	0	63	14	+49	78	Qualification for Champions League second qualifying round
2	Red Star Belgrade	30	23	2	5	53	17	+36	71	Qualification for Europa League third qualifying round (Note: Red Star Belgrade as 2009–10 Serbian Cup winners have qualified for the third qualifying round of the UEFA Europa League.)
3	OFK Beograd	30	15	5	10	38	33	+5	50	Qualification for Europa League second qualifying round
4	Spartak Zlatibor Voda	30	14	7	9	34	27	+7	49	Qualification for Europa League second qualifying round
5	Vojvodina	30	13	6	11	51	30	+21	45	

Source: SuperLiga
Rules for classification: 1) points; 2) goal difference; 3) number of goals scored.
(C) Champions
Notes:

Date	Opponent	Venue	Result	Scorers
15 August 2009	Jagodina	A	3–0	Lekić (2), Blažić
23 August 2009	Rad	H	1–0	Perović
30 August 2009	Napredak Kruševac	A	1–1	Lekić
12 September 2009	Metalac Gornji Milanovac	H	3–0	Lekić (2), Blažić
20 September 2009	Smederevo	A	3–0	Perović, Bogdanović (pen.), Jevtić
27 September 2009	Vojvodina	A	1–0	Perović
3 October 2009	OFK Beograd	H	2–1	Perović, Bogdanović (pen.)
17 October 2009	Mladi Radnik	A	1–0	Issah
24 October 2009	Borac Čačak	H	1–0	Bogdanović
31 October 2009	Javor Ivanjica	A	2–0	Vilotić, Lekić
7 November 2009	Hajduk Kula	H	1–0	Sávio
21 November 2009	Čukarički	A	3–0	Lekić (2), Jevtić
28 November 2009	Partizan	H	1–2	Knežević (o.g.)
5 December 2009	BSK Borča	A	1–0	Jevtić
12 December 2009	Spartak Zlatibor Voda	H	5–2	Cadú (pen.), Perović (2), Blažić, Jevtić
27 February 2010	Jagodina	H	1–0	Ignjatijević
7 March 2010	Rad	A	2–1	Vilotić, Ignjatijević
13 March 2010	Napredak Kruševac	H	2–1	Ninkov, Jevtić
20 March 2010	Metalac Gornji Milanovac	A	1–2	Bogdanović (pen.)
24 March 2010	Smederevo	H	2–1	Cadú (pen.), Lazović
27 March 2010	Vojvodina	H	3–0	Lekić (2), Trifunović
3 April 2010	OFK Beograd	A	2–0	Perović, Lekić
11 April 2010	Mladi Radnik	H	4–1	Jevtić (2), Cadú (pen.), Sávio
17 April 2010	Borac Čačak	A	0–0	
21 April 2010	Javor Ivanjica	H	0–1	
25 April 2010	Hajduk Kula	A	1–0	Kasalica (o.g.)
1 May 2010	Čukarički	H	4–0	Jevtić (3), Trifunović
8 May 2010	Partizan	A	0–1	
13 May 2010	BSK Borča	H	1–3	Sávio
16 May 2010	Spartak Zlatibor Voda	A	1–0	Lekić

=== Serbian Cup ===
Date	Opponent	Venue	Result	Scorers
22 September 2009	Mladost Apatin	H	6–1	Jevtić (2), Perović, Lazović (2), Nikolić
28 October 2009	Novi Pazar	A	1–0	Jevtić
25 November 2009	Spartak Zlatibor Voda	H	3–2	Vilotić, Perović, Lekić
14 April 2010	OFK Beograd	H	1–0	Lekić
5 May 2010	Vojvodina	N	3–0	Jevtić, Cadú, Trifunović

=== UEFA Europa League ===
==== Second qualifying round ====
16 July 2009 QR2	Rudar Velenje (Slovenia)	0–1	(Serbia) Red Star	Velenje, Slovenia
20:00		Report	Perović 59'	Stadium: Ob Jezeru; Attendance: 3,000; Referee: Jérôme Laperrière (Switzerland)

23 July 2009 QR2	Red Star (Serbia)	4–0 (5–0 agg.)	(Slovenia) Rudar Velenje	Belgrade, Serbia
20:30	Bogdanović 37'; Jevtić 74', 90+4'; Cadu 85'	Report		Stadium: Stadion Crvena Zvezda; Attendance: 25,000; Referee: Maxim Layushkin (Russia)

==== Third qualifying round ====
30 July 2009 QR3	Dinamo Tbilisi (Georgia (country))	2–0	(Serbia) Red Star	Tbilisi, Georgia
16:00	Merebashvili 41'; Khmaladze 87'	Report		Stadium: Boris Paichadze Stadium; Attendance: 10,000; Referee: Pol van Boekel (Netherlands)

6 August 2009 QR3	Red Star (Serbia)	5–2 (5–4 agg.)	(Georgia (country)) Dinamo Tbilisi	Belgrade, Serbia
20:45	Perović 18'; Lekić 26', 45+2', 88'; Cadu 76' (pen.)	Report	Lekić 3' (o.g.); Vatsadze 24'	Stadium: Stadion Crvena Zvezda; Attendance: 30,000; Referee: Said Ennjimi (France)

==== Play-off round ====
20 August 2009 Play-off	Slavia Prague (Czech Republic)	3–0	(Serbia) Red Star	Prague, Czech Republic
20:00	Šenkeřík 34', 65'; Vlček 81'	Report		Stadium: Synot Tip Arena; Attendance: 12,625; Referee: Paul Allaerts (Belgium)

27 August 2009 Play-off	Red Star (Serbia)	2–1 (2–4 agg.)	(Czech Republic) Slavia Prague	Belgrade, Serbia
20:30	Bogdanović 23' (pen.); Perović 45'	Report	Vlček 63'	Stadium: Stadion Crvena Zvezda; Attendance: 35,000; Referee: Thorsten Kinhöfer (Germany)

== See also ==
- List of Red Star Belgrade seasons
