= List of Serbian football transfers winter 2009–10 =

This is a list of transfers in Serbian football for the 2009–10 winter transfer window. Only moves featuring a Serbian Superliga side are listed.

== Serbian SuperLiga ==
=== Red Star Belgrade ===
In: Note: Flags indicate national team as defined under FIFA eligibility rules; some limited exceptions apply. Players may hold more than one non-FIFA nationality.

No.	Pos.	Nation	Player
99	FW	AZE	Branimir Subašić (Loan return from (China) Changchun Yatai)
10	MF	MNE	Marko Mugoša (From Borac Čačak)
5	DF	SRB	Bojan Đorđević (On loan from FK Novi Pazar)
7	MF	SRB	Milan Jeremić (From FK Zemun)
14	DF	SRB	Nikola Mikić (From FK Napredak Kruševac)
29	FW	SRB	Miloš Reljić (Loan return from Srem (SM))
11	FW	SRB	Miloš Trifunović (From FK Javor)
16	DF	MNE	Stevan Reljić (From (Montenegro) Rudar Pljevlja)

Out: Note: Flags indicate national team as defined under FIFA eligibility rules; some limited exceptions apply. Players may hold more than one non-FIFA nationality.

No.	Pos.	Nation	Player
4	DF	BIH	Ognjen Vranješ (On loan to FK Napredak Kruševac)
16	MF	SRB	Nenad Srećković (On loan to FK Mladi Radnik)
13	DF	SRB	Đorđe Tutorić (To (Hungary) Ferencváros)
3	DF	BIH	Nikola Vasiljević (On loan to NK Croatia Sesvete)
29	MF	SRB	Igor Mijović (On loan to FK Mladi Radnik)
12	GK	SRB	Saša Radivojević (On loan to Čukarički)
7	MF	SRB	Nemanja Obrić (On loan to FK Mladi Radnik)

=== Partizan ===
In: Note: Flags indicate national team as defined under FIFA eligibility rules; some limited exceptions apply. Players may hold more than one non-FIFA nationality.

No.	Pos.	Nation	Player
3	DF	SRB	Vojislav Stankovic (From OFK Beograd)
17	FW	SRB	Predrag Mijić (From Spartak Subotica)
6	DF	SRB	Radenko Kamberovic (From FK Sevojno)
23	FW	SRB	Aleksandar Davidov (From Hajduk Kula)
22	MF	SRB	Saša Ilić (From (Austria) Red Bull Salzburg)
18	DF	MKD	Aleksandar Lazevski (Loan return from FK Teleoptik)
15	DF	SRB	Jovan Krneta (From youth squad)
14	MF	SRB	Darko Brašanac (From youth squad)

Out: Note: Flags indicate national team as defined under FIFA eligibility rules; some limited exceptions apply. Players may hold more than one non-FIFA nationality.

No.	Pos.	Nation	Player
52	DF	SRB	Goran Gavrančić (To (China) Henan Construction)
17	FW	SRB	Miloš Bogunović (On loan to (Spain) Cádiz CF)
2	DF	SRB	Siniša Stevanović (On loan to Spartak Subotica)
22	MF	SRB	Adem Ljajić (To (Italy) ACF Fiorentina)
33	DF	BIH	Aleksandar Kosorić (To Rad)
2	DF	SRB	Bogdan Stević (On loan to FK Teleoptik)
-	MF	SRB	Nenad Marinković (On loan to FK Teleoptik, previously on loan to (Greece) OFI)
31	DF	SRB	Rajko Brezančić (On loan to FK Teleoptik)
4	DF	SRB	Nenad Đorđević (To (Russia) Krylia Sovetov)

=== FK Vojvodina ===
In: Note: Flags indicate national team as defined under FIFA eligibility rules; some limited exceptions apply. Players may hold more than one non-FIFA nationality.

No.	Pos.	Nation	Player
20	FW	GHA	Sadick Adams (From (Spain) Atlético Madrid B)
23	DF	SRB	Dušan Nestorović (From (Montenegro) Rudar Pljevlja)
5	DF	MNE	Duško Đurišić (From (Cyprus) Apollon Limassol)
7	MF	SRB	Slobodan Novaković (From FK Novi Sad)
21	FW	BIH	Nemanja Bilbija (From (Bosnia and Herzegovina) Borac Banja Luka)
13	MF	SRB	Vuk Mitošević (Loan return from FK Palić)
17	MF	GEO	Giorgi Merebashvili (From (Georgia (country)) Dinamo Tbilisi)

Out: Note: Flags indicate national team as defined under FIFA eligibility rules; some limited exceptions apply. Players may hold more than one non-FIFA nationality.

No.	Pos.	Nation	Player
5	DF	SRB	Mitar Peković (Free, To (Russia) Anzhi Makhachkala)
21	MF	MKD	Vlatko Grozdanoski (To (Cyprus) AEL Limassol)
33	FW	SRB	Danijel Aleksić (To (Italy) Genoa CFC)
7	DF	SRB	Ivan Gvozdenović (To (Greece) Kavala F.C.)
19	MF	SUI	Boban Maksimović (To (Switzerland) FC Biel-Bienne)
15	DF	SRB	Darko Lovrić (On loan to (Armenia) FC Banants)
-	FW	MNE	Davor Božović (On loan to FK Palić, previously bought from (Montenegro) FK Čelik Nikšić)
-	DF	MNE	Ilija Bulatović (On loan to FK Palić, previously bought from (Montenegro) FK Čelik Nikšić)
-	DF	BIH	Miroslav Stevanović (On loan to (Bosnia and Herzegovina) Borac Banja Luka, previously on loan at FK Palić)
-	-	SRB	Damir Zeljko (On loan to Radnički Sombor)
30	GK	SRB	Darko Ristić (On loan to FK Veternik)
-	GK	SRB	Damir Drinić (On loan to Proleter Novi Sad)
-	MF	BIH	Nikola Mojović (On loan to Proleter Novi Sad)

=== OFK Belgrade ===
In: Note: Flags indicate national team as defined under FIFA eligibility rules; some limited exceptions apply. Players may hold more than one non-FIFA nationality.

No.	Pos.	Nation	Player
3	DF	SRB	Aleksandar Mijatović (Free, previously with Metalac Futog)
6	DF	MNE	Miloš Mrvaljević (Loan return from Mladost Apatin)
20	FW	SRB	Bojan Aleksić (Loan return from Mladost Apatin)
32	FW	SRB	Mladen Popović (From Vujić Voda Valjevo)
17	FW	SRB	Nenad Injac (From (Russia) Volga NN)
-	MF	SRB	Andrej Mrkela (On loan from Red Star Belgrade)

Out: Note: Flags indicate national team as defined under FIFA eligibility rules; some limited exceptions apply. Players may hold more than one non-FIFA nationality.

No.	Pos.	Nation	Player
3	DF	SRB	Vojislav Stanković (To Partizan)
6	DF	SRB	Nikola Jolović (Free)
20	MF	SRB	Emir Lotinac (To FK Novi Pazar)
31	GK	SRB	Nikola Matek (On loan to Srem Jakovo)
2	DF	SRB	Novica Milenović (On loan to Radnički Sombor)
4	DF	SRB	Nebojša Skopljak (On loan to FK Novi Pazar)
24	DF	SRB	Nenad Stjepić (On loan to Radnički Sombor)
-	DF	SRB	Filip Pjević (On loan to Radnički Sombor)
17	MF	SRB	Zoran Milovac (On loan to FK Inđija)
-	MF	BIH	Igor Mišan (On loan to Radnički Sombor)
28	FW	SRB	Stefan Šćepović (On loan to (Italy) Sampdoria)
-	FW	SRB	Rodoljub Marjanović (On loan to Hajduk Kula, previously on loan at Radnički Sombor)
16	MF	SRB	Miloš Adamović (On loan to (Moldova) Sheriff Tiraspol)

=== Spartak Subotica ===
In: Note: Flags indicate national team as defined under FIFA eligibility rules; some limited exceptions apply. Players may hold more than one non-FIFA nationality.

No.	Pos.	Nation	Player
17	DF	SRB	Siniša Stevanović (On loan from Partizan)
9	FW	SRB	Srđan Vujaklija (From FK Novi Sad)
23	DF	SRB	Marko Veselinović (From Radnički Sombor)
7	MF	SRB	Marko Adamović (From Jedinstvo Ub)

Out: Note: Flags indicate national team as defined under FIFA eligibility rules; some limited exceptions apply. Players may hold more than one non-FIFA nationality.

No.	Pos.	Nation	Player
7	FW	SRB	Predrag Mijić (To Partizan)
25	GK	SRB	Miloš Milinović (To (Bosnia and Herzegovina) Borac Banja Luka, was on loan from ČSK Čelarevo)
23	FW	SRB	Lazar Veselinović (To ČSK Čelarevo)
9	FW	SRB	Milorad Janjus (To (Uzbekistan) Pakhtakor Tashkent)

=== FK Jagodina ===
In: Note: Flags indicate national team as defined under FIFA eligibility rules; some limited exceptions apply. Players may hold more than one non-FIFA nationality.

No.	Pos.	Nation	Player
2	DF	SRB	Aleksandar Simčević (From (Bosnia and Herzegovina) FK Olimpik Sarajevo)
21	FW	SRB	Milutin Ivanović (From Radnički Niš)
32	DF	SRB	Dušan Ivanov (From (Portugal) CD Nacional(Youth team))
16	DF	SRB	Nenad Nastić (From (Russia) FC Khimki)
1	GK	SRB	Budimir Janošević (From Čukarički)
7	MF	SRB	Nenad Šljivić (From (Russia) FC Rostov)
12	GK	SRB	Danijel Milanović (On loan from OFK Beograd, previously with Jedinstvo Paraćin)
-	-	SRB	Stefan Sibinović (From Jedinstvo Paraćin)

Out: Note: Flags indicate national team as defined under FIFA eligibility rules; some limited exceptions apply. Players may hold more than one non-FIFA nationality.

No.	Pos.	Nation	Player
23	MF	SRB	Miloš Nikolić (On loan to Srem (SM))
26	DF	SRB	Vukašin Tomić (On loan to Mladost Lučani)
12	GK	SRB	Zoran Vasković (On loan to Radnički Niš)
16	FW	GHA	Kennedy Boateng (To (Tanzania) Young Africans)
8	MF	SRB	Miloš Živković (Free)
20	MF	SRB	Marko Avramović (To FK Banat)
14	MF	SRB	Stefan Stevanović (free)
35	GK	SRB	Aleksandar Vekić (To Sloga Despotovac)

=== FK Javor ===
In: Note: Flags indicate national team as defined under FIFA eligibility rules; some limited exceptions apply. Players may hold more than one non-FIFA nationality.

No.	Pos.	Nation	Player
24	FW	MKD	Filip Petrov (From (North Macedonia) Vardar Skopje)
23	GK	SRB	Vladan Đogatović (Loan return from Mladost Lučani)
3	FW	SRB	Aleksandar Leposavić (From Sloga Požega)
22	DF	SRB	Milan Milinković (From FK Teleoptik)
6	DF	SRB	Boris Miličić (From (Hungary) Diósgyőri VTK)
7	MF	SRB	Ivan Cvetković (From (Russia) FC Khimki)
9	FW	SRB	Stevan Račić (From (South Korea) Daejeon Citizen)
-	FW	SRB	Dino Caković (From FK Novi Pazar)

Out: Note: Flags indicate national team as defined under FIFA eligibility rules; some limited exceptions apply. Players may hold more than one non-FIFA nationality.

No.	Pos.	Nation	Player
9	FW	SRB	Miloš Trifunović (To Red Star Belgrade)
24	MF	URU	Gerardo Vonder Putten (To (Chile) Cobreloa)
2	FW	NGR	Frank Egharevba (To Austria Lustenau)
23	GK	MNE	Branko Vujović (To Metalac G.M.)
6	DF	SRB	Đuro Jandrić (Free)
22	MF	SRB	Bojan Čukić (To (Bosnia and Herzegovina) Borac Banja Luka)
7	MF	SRB	Filip Stojanović (On loan to Čukarički)

=== FK Smederevo ===
In: Note: Flags indicate national team as defined under FIFA eligibility rules; some limited exceptions apply. Players may hold more than one non-FIFA nationality.

No.	Pos.	Nation	Player
22	GK	SRB	Igor Kojić (From (Romania) Dinamo Bucharest)
2	DF	SRB	Nemanja Ilić (From FK Mladi Radnik)
23	FW	BRA	Renan (From (Brazil) SC São Paulo)
15	MF	SLO	Milan Rakič (From (Hungary) Kecskeméti TE)
4	DF	MNE	Dejan Ognjanović (From (Poland) ŁKS Łódź)
7	MF	SRB	Marko Mitrović (From (Kazakhstan) Lokomotiv Astana)

Out: Note: Flags indicate national team as defined under FIFA eligibility rules; some limited exceptions apply. Players may hold more than one non-FIFA nationality.

No.	Pos.	Nation	Player
2	DF	SRB	Predrag Stamenković (To Radnički Niš)
15	DF	SRB	Zoran Ljubinković (To Radnički Niš)
-	MF	SRB	Milan Milojević (To (Slovakia) FC Nitra, previously on loan in Morava V.Plana)
4	DF	SRB	Željko Kovačević (To (Hungary) Nyíregyháza Spartacus)
8	FW	SRB	Dragan Ćeran (On loan to (Belgium) KVC Westerlo)
1	GK	SRB	Borivoje Rumenić (To Hajduk Beograd)
22	GK	SRB	Željko Kuzmić (To (Ethiopia) Saint George SC)

=== Borac Čačak ===
In: Note: Flags indicate national team as defined under FIFA eligibility rules; some limited exceptions apply. Players may hold more than one non-FIFA nationality.

No.	Pos.	Nation	Player
24	FW	SRB	Slađan Nikodijević (From Radnički Svilajnac)
33	GK	SRB	Radiša Ilić (From (Greece) Panserraikos)
4	DF	SRB	Aleksandar Ignjatović (Loan return from (Netherlands) Feyenoord)
26	MF	SRB	Miloš Tomašević (From Palilulac Beograd)
22	MF	MKD	Stefan Spirovski (From (North Macedonia) FK Pelister)
3	FW	SRB	Boban Stojanović (From (Greece) Panetolikos)
7	MF	BRA	Andrezinho (Free, previously with (Lebanon) Al-Ansar Beirut)
10	MF	SRB	Dušan Martinović (From FK Napredak Kruševac)
16	MF	MNE	Danilo Radulović (From (Montenegro) Sutjeska Nikšić)
17	DF	SRB	Mario Maslac (From youth squad)

Out: Note: Flags indicate national team as defined under FIFA eligibility rules; some limited exceptions apply. Players may hold more than one non-FIFA nationality.

No.	Pos.	Nation	Player
10	MF	MNE	Marko Mugoša (To Red Star Belgrade)
12	GK	BIH	Branko Grahovac (To (Romania) FC Oţelul Galaţi)
22	MF	SRB	Milan Davidov (To (Hungary) Nyíregyháza Spartacus)
7	MF	SRB	Ivan Đoković (To (Slovakia) MFK Košice)
77	MF	SRB	Filip Knežević (To FK Bežanija, previously on loan with FK Voždovac)
4	DF	SRB	Dragan Dragutinović (To FK Metalac G.M.)
8	FW	MNE	Ilija Spasojević (To (Latvia) FK Liepājas Metalurgs)

=== Hajduk Kula ===
In: Note: Flags indicate national team as defined under FIFA eligibility rules; some limited exceptions apply. Players may hold more than one non-FIFA nationality.

No.	Pos.	Nation	Player
11	FW	SRB	Rodoljub Marjanović (On loan from OFK Beograd)
16	DF	SRB	Dušan Brković (On loan from Partizan, previously on loan at FK Teleoptik)
4	MF	SRB	Branislav Stanić (On loan from Partizan, previously on loan at FK Teleoptik)
25	GK	SRB	Nemanja Jovšić (Free)
6	DF	SRB	Đorđe Mrđanin (From (Hungary) Vasas SC)
-	MF	MNE	Igor Kostić (From (Montenegro) Sutjeska Nikšić)
20	DF	MNE	Blažo Lalević (From Tekstilac Ites)

Out: Note: Flags indicate national team as defined under FIFA eligibility rules; some limited exceptions apply. Players may hold more than one non-FIFA nationality.

No.	Pos.	Nation	Player
11	MF	SRB	Aleksandar Davidov (To Partizan)
25	GK	SRB	Srđan Žakula (To Radnički Sombor)
4	DF	SRB	Siniša Radanović (To (China) Shandong Luneng)
6	DF	SRB	Bojan Dojkić (To Radnički Niš)
20	FW	SRB	Marko Jovanović (On loan to Proleter Novi Sad)
-	MF	SRB	Uroš Milosavljević (Free)
17	MF	MNE	Srđan Đukanović (To Cement Beočin)
-	FW	SRB	Boris Bošnjaković (To ČSK Čelarevo)
26	FW	SRB	Branko Pauljević (Free)
16	DF	SRB	Aleksandar Kaurin (Free)

=== FK Napredak Kruševac ===
In: Note: Flags indicate national team as defined under FIFA eligibility rules; some limited exceptions apply. Players may hold more than one non-FIFA nationality.

No.	Pos.	Nation	Player
12	GK	SRB	Dalibor Milenković (Loan return from Kolubara Lazarevac)
-	GK	SRB	Danilo Pustinjaković (From (North Macedonia) FK Makedonija G.P.)
14	DF	BIH	Ognjen Vranješ (On loan from Red Star Belgrade)
2	MF	SRB	Nenad Milunović (From Radnički Niš)
-	MF	SRB	Stefan Milosavljević (Loan return from Trajal Kruševac)
24	DF	SRB	Boban Vukmirović (Loan return from Trajal Kruševac)
-	-	SRB	Igor Stanojević (Loan return from Trajal Kruševac)
8	MF	SRB	Nikola Mitrović (From (Russia) Volga NN)
18	DF	SRB	Josip Projić (From (Russia) Volga NN)
-	MF	BIH	Ilija Ristanić (Free, previously with (Bosnia and Herzegovina) FK Modriča)
4	MF	SRB	Milorad Savić (Loan return from Kopaonik Brus)
1	GK	SRB	Marko Nikolić (Loan return from FK Trstenik)
-	DF	SRB	Slobodan Aleksov (From BASK Beograd)

Out: Note: Flags indicate national team as defined under FIFA eligibility rules; some limited exceptions apply. Players may hold more than one non-FIFA nationality.

No.	Pos.	Nation	Player
6	DF	SRB	Nikola Mikić (To Red Star Belgrade)
3	MF	SRB	Radmilo Pavlović (Free)
4	DF	MNE	Dejan Damjanović (To (Montenegro) Rudar Pljevlja)
18	FW	NGR	Ikechukwu Ezeh (To (Montenegro) FK Dečić)
1	GK	SRB	Bojan Šejić (To (Bosnia and Herzegovina) FK Laktaši)
2	DF	SRB	Goran Stojković (To (Bosnia and Herzegovina) FK Laktaši)
25	GK	SRB	Dalibor Radovanović (Free)
22	GK	SRB	Nikola Mirković (To Srem (SM))
8	MF	SRB	Dušan Martinović (To Borac Čačak)
11	MF	SRB	Dušan Mihajlović (To FK Sevojno)
-	MF	SRB	Ivan Marinković (To (North Macedonia) Milano Kumanovo)
24	FW	PRK	Yong Lee-Ja (Free)
31	DF	SRB	Dušan Petronijević (To (Iran) Damash Iranian FC)

=== Mladi Radnik ===
In: Note: Flags indicate national team as defined under FIFA eligibility rules; some limited exceptions apply. Players may hold more than one non-FIFA nationality.

No.	Pos.	Nation	Player
18	MF	SRB	Nenad Srećković (On loan from Red Star Belgrade)
20	MF	SRB	Igor Mijović (On loan from Red Star Belgrade)
21	MF	SRB	Nemanja Obrić (On loan from Red Star Belgrade)
-	GK	SRB	Bojan Mišić (From (Russia) FC Khimki)
17	FW	SRB	Goran Antelj (On loan from (Poland) Warta Poznań, previously with BSK Borča)
15	DF	SRB	Nikola Prebiračević (From Hajduk Beograd)

Out: Note: Flags indicate national team as defined under FIFA eligibility rules; some limited exceptions apply. Players may hold more than one non-FIFA nationality.

No.	Pos.	Nation	Player
18	FW	SRB	Milan Perić (To Metalac G.M.)
23	FW	UGA	Eugene Sseppuya (To (Lithuania) FK Sūduva)
29	FW	SRB	Dušan Janković (To Sloboda Užice)
-	DF	SRB	Nenad Nikolić (To (Croatia) Inter Zaprešić)
26	DF	SRB	Dušan Rajda (Free)
17	MF	SRB	Bratislav Pejčić (To Radnički Niš)
-	MF	SRB	Goran Lepojević (To Rudar Kostolac)
18	MF	SRB	Miloš Damnjanović (To Rudar Kostolac)
3	DF	SRB	Aleksandar Vasiljević (To (Kazakhstan) Irtysh Pavlodar)
-	FW	SWE	Denijal Klačar (Free)

=== Rad ===
In: Note: Flags indicate national team as defined under FIFA eligibility rules; some limited exceptions apply. Players may hold more than one non-FIFA nationality.

No.	Pos.	Nation	Player
40	GK	SRB	Miloš Stepandić (From Mačva Šabac)
12	DF	BIH	Boris Savić (From (Bosnia and Herzegovina) FK Laktaši)
28	MF	SRB	Marko Stanojević (From (Bosnia and Herzegovina) FK Laktaši)
14	DF	BIH	Aleksandar Kosorić (From Partizan)
7	MF	SRB	Miloš Dimitrijević (From (France) Grenoble)
24	MF	CHN	Li Chunyu (From (China) Changsha Ginde)

Out: Note: Flags indicate national team as defined under FIFA eligibility rules; some limited exceptions apply. Players may hold more than one non-FIFA nationality.

No.	Pos.	Nation	Player
-	MF	SRB	Slaviša Jeremić (To (Romania) Ceahlăul Piatra Neamţ, was on loan in FK Metalac G.M.)
14	FW	SRB	Dalibor Mitrović (To (Vietnam) SLNA FC)
7	MF	SRB	Nenad Stojaković (To (Vietnam) SLNA FC)
12	MF	SRB	Miroslav Petronijević (To Čukarički)
-	DF	SRB	Radoš Protić (On loan to Mačva Šabac, previously on loan with (Bosnia and Herzegovina) FK Leotar)
-	MF	MNE	Darko Karadžić (On loan to FK Inđija, previously on loan with (Hungary) FC Fehérvár)
-	MF	SRB	Milan Vignjević (To BSK Borča)
14	FW	SRB	Nemanja Obradović (Free)

=== BSK Borča ===
In: Note: Flags indicate national team as defined under FIFA eligibility rules; some limited exceptions apply. Players may hold more than one non-FIFA nationality.

No.	Pos.	Nation	Player
8	MF	SRB	Ivan Obrovac (From Mačva Šabac)
-	MF	SRB	Elhan Bejtović (From FK Novi Pazar)
-	MF	SRB	Jovan Vasić (Loan return from PKB Padinska Skela)
17	MF	SRB	Milan Vignjević (From Rad)

Out: Note: Flags indicate national team as defined under FIFA eligibility rules; some limited exceptions apply. Players may hold more than one non-FIFA nationality.

No.	Pos.	Nation	Player
17	FW	SRB	Goran Antelj (To FK Mladi Radnik)
2	DF	SUI	Nikola Nikolić (Free)
8	MF	SRB	Miloš Milivojević (Free)

=== FK Metalac G.M. ===
In: Note: Flags indicate national team as defined under FIFA eligibility rules; some limited exceptions apply. Players may hold more than one non-FIFA nationality.

No.	Pos.	Nation	Player
15	DF	SRB	Aleksandar Miljković (From FK Teleoptik)
19	MF	SRB	Aleksandar Petrović (From Radnički Obrenovac)
10	FW	SRB	Milan Perić (From FK Mladi Radnik)
22	MF	SRB	Bojan Pavlović (From Čukarički)
24	DF	SRB	Dragan Dragutinović (From Borac Čačak)
25	GK	MNE	Branko Vujović (From FK Javor)
-	DF	SRB	Marko Jakšić (From FK Inđija)
-	MF	SRB	Damir Opačić (From ČSK Čelarevo)

Out: Note: Flags indicate national team as defined under FIFA eligibility rules; some limited exceptions apply. Players may hold more than one non-FIFA nationality.

No.	Pos.	Nation	Player
15	MF	SRB	Slaviša Jeremić (Loan return to Rad)
5	DF	SRB	Dragiša Žunić (To Mladost Lučani)
22	MF	SRB	Miloš Obradović (Loan return to Mladost Lučani)
20	MF	SRB	Zoran Zukić (On loan to Proleter Novi Sad)
-	MF	SRB	Nemanja Ilić (To Smederevo)
10	FW	SRB	Milan Mijaijlović (To Sloga Kraljevo)
24	MF	SRB	Mirko Teodorović (To (Hong Kong) Shatin SA)
9	FW	SRB	Saša Jovanović (Free)

=== Čukarički ===
In: Note: Flags indicate national team as defined under FIFA eligibility rules; some limited exceptions apply. Players may hold more than one non-FIFA nationality.

No.	Pos.	Nation	Player
-	MF	SRB	Stefan Milojević (From FK Teleoptik)
-	MF	SRB	Marko Milenković (From FK Teleoptik)
-	MF	SRB	Aleksandar Andrejević (From OFK Mladenovac)
-	DF	SRB	Jovica Tabaković (From Srem (SM))
-	-	SRB	Milan Vignjević (From Rad (Youth squad))
14	MF	SRB	Miroslav Petronijević (From Rad)
1	GK	SRB	Saša Radivojević (On loan from Red Star Belgrade)
-	MF	SRB	Filip Stojanović (On loan from FK Javor)
21	DF	SRB	Nenad Višnjić (From (Montenegro) Budućnost Podgorica)
8	MF	SRB	Miloš Jokić (From (Bosnia and Herzegovina) Olimpik Sarajevo)
12	DF	SRB	Aleksandar Trninić (From (Bosnia and Herzegovina) FK Leotar)
7	FW	SRB	Nikola Grubješić (Free, previously with (Russia) FC KAMAZ)
10	MF	SRB	Nikola Trajković (Free, previously with (Greece) Thraysvoulos)
11	MF	SRB	Aleksandar Stoimirović (From (Bulgaria) Chernomorets Burgas)

Out: Note: Flags indicate national team as defined under FIFA eligibility rules; some limited exceptions apply. Players may hold more than one non-FIFA nationality.

No.	Pos.	Nation	Player
50	GK	SRB	Bojan Isailović (To (Poland) Zaglebie Lubin)
27	MF	SRB	Bojan Pavlović (To Metalac G.M.)
1	GK	SRB	Budimir Janošević (To FK Jagodina)
12	MF	SRB	Sreten Stanić (To (Bosnia and Herzegovina) Borac Banja Luka)
16	FW	SRB	Marko Rajić (To FK Sopot)
-	MF	SRB	Vladimir Ilić (To FK Sopot)
14	DF	SRB	Saša Blagojević (To (Kuwait) Kazma SC)
25	DF	SRB	Mirko Bunjevčević (To (Azerbaijan) Olimpik Baku)
8	MF	SRB	Vladimir Tintor (To (Montenegro) FK Berane)
15	MF	SRB	Dušan Kolarević (To Sinđelić Niš)
34	DF	MNE	Marko Filipović (Free)
17	FW	SRB	Vladimir Ribić (to (Iran) Tarbiat Yazd F.C.)

== See also ==
- Serbian SuperLiga
- Serbian Superliga 2009-10
- List of Serbian football transfers summer 2009
