= Mijović =

Mijović is a surname. Notable people with the surname include:

- Carley Mijović, a.k.a. Carley Ernst (born 1994), Australian basketball player
- Igor Mijović (born 1985), Serbian footballer
- Luna Mijović (born 1991), Bosnian actress
- Marko Mijović (born 1987), Montenegrin basketball player
- Milivoje Mijović (born 1991), Serbian basketball player
- Petar Mijović (born 1982), Montenegrin basketball coach
- Rajko Mijović (born 1959), Serbian politician
