= Nemanja Cvetković =

Nemanja Cvetković may refer to:

- Nemanja Cvetković (footballer, born 1980)
- Nemanja Cvetković (footballer, born 1996)
