= Marko Jakšić =

Marko Jakšić may refer to:

- Marko Jakšić (footballer, born 1983), Serbian association football player
- Marko Jakšić (footballer, born 1987), Serbian association football player
