= Vignjević =

Vignjević (Serbian: Вигњевић) is a Serbian surname. Notable people with the surname include:

- Milan Vignjević (born 1989), Serbian football player
- Nebojša Vignjević (born 1968), Serbian footballer and manager
- Nikola Vignjević (born 1971), Serbian footballer and coach
