= Stepandić =

Stepandić, anglicised Stepandic or Stepandich (Serbian Cyrillic: Степандић) is a Serbian surname.

Notable people with this surname include:

- Miloš Stepandić (born 1990), Serbian football player
- Milovan Stepandić (1954–2020), Serbian basketball coach
