= Darko Lazović =

Serbian footballer

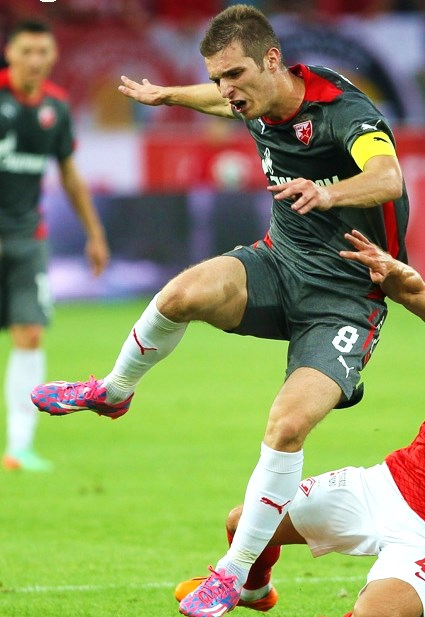
- Lazović playing for Red Star Belgrade in 2014

Personal information
- Full name: Darko Lazović
- Date of birth: 15 September 1990 (age 36)
- Place of birth: Čačak, SR Serbia, Yugoslavia
- Height: 1.81 m (5 ft 11 in)
- Position: Winger

Youth career
- 1996–2007: Borac Čačak

Senior career*
Years	Team	Apps	(Gls)
2008–2009	Borac Čačak	42	(6)
2009–2015	Red Star Belgrade	117	(29)
2015–2019	Genoa	102	(5)
2019–2025	Hellas Verona	194	(16)
2025	Al Wahda	2	(0)
Total		457	(56)

International career^{‡}
2008–2009	Serbia U19	2	(0)
2011–2012	Serbia U21	11	(4)
2008–2023	Serbia	29	(1)
- * Club domestic league appearances and goals as of 18 May 2025 ‡ National team caps and goals as of 20 June 2023

Darko Lazović (Serbian Cyrillic: Дарко Лазовић, pronounced [dǎːrko lâːzoʋitɕ]; born 15 September 1990) is a Serbian professional footballer who plays as a left winger.

At the age of 21, Lazović was recognized as the best young player of the Serbian Superliga in 2011.

== Club career ==
=== Borac Čačak ===
From the age of six, Lazović began to train in the youth academy of FK Borac Čačak. By the time he played for the junior team, he was attracting the attention of scouts from outside of Čačak. On 2 March 2008, he made his senior debut for Borac head coach Milovan Rajevac in a league match against Hajduk Kula. He scored his first competitive goal for Borac Čačak on 22 March 2008, in a Serbian Superliga match against Vojvodina. In February 2009, Lazović trained with the first-team of Tottenham Hotspur F.C. for a couple of days, and by 10 February, Borac coach Ljubiša Dmitrović, told the press "For all I know, Lazović has been transferred to Tottenham". However, a contract was never signed, and domestic club Red Star Belgrade took the initiative.

=== Red Star Belgrade ===
On 22 June 2009, at the age of 18, Lazović completed a transfer from Borac to Red Star, whose coach at the time was Vladimir Petrović. He signed a four-year contract with Red Star. He missed the start of the season due to injury, but made his debut on 12 September 2009 against Metalac Gornji Milanovac. He came off the bench in the 65th minute to replace Nikola Vasiljević. He scored his first goal for Red Star on 23 September 2009, in the sixteenth Serbian Cup match against Mladost Apatin. Red Star went on to win 6–1 and Lazović scored a brace. Otherwise, Lazović saw little playing time until the arrival of coach Robert Prosinečki, after which he was named as best young player in the Serbian Superliga. He played an important role in Red Star's 2011–12 UEFA Europa League qualifying campaign, as he started most of the games and contributed to a deep run into the qualification playoff, where Red Star lost to Stade Rennais.

In the semi-final of the 2011–12 Serbian Cup, On 11 April 2012, he scored a goal against historic rival Partizan, in a game which Red Star won 2–0. That year, Red Star would go on to win the 2012 Serbian Cup Final. On 4 July 2012, Lazović signed a three-year contract extension, ending speculation about a possible transfer after Red Bull Salzburg made an offer for him. Although Red Star didn't win the league that season, it was the second consecutive season in which Red Star made a play-off run in the UEFA Europa League qualifying phase. During the 2011-12 Europa League campaign, Lazović contributed with assists against Naftan Novopolotsk and played full matches against Omonia and Bordeaux.

Although a period of instability followed at Red Star, Lazović remained in the starting eleven even after a quick succession of coaches: Robert Prosinečki, Aleksandar Janković, and Ricardo Sá Pinto. However, on 18 May 2013, in a match against Partizan, he suffered a season-ending knee injury, eight minutes into the game.

While Lazović was injured, Ricardo Sá Pinto voluntarily resigned from Red Star, and new coach Slaviša Stojanovič was enthusiastic about giving Lazović some playing time as soon as his injury allowed. On 22 February 2014, Lazović played his first competitive match after eight months of injury and made an assist against Javor. On 12 April 2014, Lazović scored a hat-trick against Čukarički. first in career. Lazović won his first championship with Red Star at the end of the season, after a win against OFK Beograd in a front of 55,000 fans.

After the departure of Nenad Milijaš and suspension of Nikola Mijailović during season, Lazović was appointed as new captain of Red Star Belgrade. On 14 January 2015, it was announced that at the end of the season, after six years in Red Star Belgrade, as a free player, Lazović would sign A multiyear contract with Serie A club Genoa. In his last season with Red Star, he scored 10 goals and was the team's top scorer. His last game with Red Star was on 24 May 2015, in a win against Mladost Lučani.

=== Genoa ===
In summer 2015, Lazović signed with Serie A team Genoa. In a friendly match against Hertha BSC on 1 August 2015, Lazović scored his first goal for Genoa in their 0–2 away win. On 8 November 2015, Lazović produced two assists in a 2–2 tie with Frosinone Calcio, and was subsequently named in the Serie A "Team of the Week". On 16 December 2016, Lazović scored his first goal for Genoa against Fiorentina, in a match that was only 62 minutes long as it was meant as a continuation of an unfinished match from 11 September which had been abandoned due to an unusual hailstorm. His contract expired and he left the club on 30 June 2019.

=== Hellas Verona ===
On 6 August 2019, Lazović signed a three-year contract with Serie A club Hellas Verona.

== International career ==
After being called up by coach Radomir Antić, Lazović debuted for Serbia on 14 December 2008, in a friendly match against Poland. Four years later, he came in as a substitute in the 76th minute against France during a friendly match on 31 May 2012. On 5 June 2012, during his third game for the senior team, Lazović scored an impressive goal against Sweden which was disallowed by the referee.

In November 2022, he was selected in Serbia's squad for the 2022 FIFA World Cup in Qatar. He played in a group stage match against Brazil. Serbia finished fourth in the group.

== Career statistics ==
=== Club ===
As of match played 18 May 2025

Appearances and goals by club, season and competition
Club	Season	League			Cup		Europe		Other		Total	
Club	Season	Division	Apps	Goals	Apps	Goals	Apps	Goals	Apps	Goals	Apps	Goals
Borac Čačak	2007–08	Serbian SuperLiga	14	3	0	0	–		–		14	3
Borac Čačak	2008–09	Serbian SuperLiga	28	3	2	1	5 (Note: Appearances in UEFA Europa League)	1	–		35	5
Borac Čačak	Total		42	6	2	1	5	1	–		49	8
Red Star Belgrade	2009–10	Serbian SuperLiga	9	1	2	2	0	0	–		11	3
Red Star Belgrade	2010–11	Serbian SuperLiga	16	2	3	0	0	0	–		19	2
Red Star Belgrade	2011–12	Serbian SuperLiga	27	7	6	1	4	1	–		37	9
Red Star Belgrade	2012–13	Serbian SuperLiga	23	4	2	1	6	0	–		31	5
Red Star Belgrade	2013–14	Serbian SuperLiga	14	5	0	0	0	0	–		14	5
Red Star Belgrade	2014–15	Serbian SuperLiga	28	10	2	0	0	0	–		30	10
Red Star Belgrade	Total		117	29	15	4	10	1	–		142	34
Genoa	2015–16	Serie A	15	0	1	0	–		–		16	0
Genoa	2016–17	Serie A	33	2	3	0	–		–		36	2
Genoa	2017–18	Serie A	21	0	3	0	–		–		24	0
Genoa	2018–19	Serie A	33	3	1	0	–		–		34	3
Genoa	Total		102	5	8	0	–		–		110	5
Hellas Verona	2019–20	Serie A	38	3	1	0	–		–		39	3
Hellas Verona	2020–21	Serie A	32	3	1	0	–		–		33	3
Hellas Verona	2021–22	Serie A	34	1	1	1	–		–		35	2
Hellas Verona	2022–23	Serie A	30	4	1	0	–		1 (Note: Appearances in Serie A – Relegation tie-breaker)	0	32	4
Hellas Verona	2023–24	Serie A	32	3	1	0	–		–		33	3
Hellas Verona	2024–25	Serie A	27	2	1	0	–		–		28	2
Total			193	16	6	1	–		–		200	17
Career total			455	56	31	6	15	2	1	0	502	64

=== International ===
As of match played 20 June 2023

Appearances and goals by national team and year
National team	Year	Apps	Goals
Serbia	2008	1	0
Serbia	2009	0	0
Serbia	2010	0	0
Serbia	2011	0	0
Serbia	2012	3	0
Serbia	2013	0	0
Serbia	2014	1	0
Serbia	2015	0	0
Serbia	2016	0	0
Serbia	2017	0	0
Serbia	2018	0	0
Serbia	2019	4	0
Serbia	2020	6	0
Serbia	2021	6	0
Serbia	2022	6	0
Serbia	2023	2	1
Total		29	1

==== International goals ====
Scores and results list Serbia's goal tally first.

No.	Date	Venue	Cap	Opponent	Score	Result	Competition
1.	20 June 2023	Huvepharma Arena, Razgrad, Bulgaria	29	Bulgaria	1–1	1–1	UEFA Euro 2024 qualifying

== Honours ==
Red Star Belgrade

- Serbian SuperLiga: 2013–14
- Serbian Cup: 2009–10, 2011–12

Individual

- Serbian SuperLiga Team of the Season: 2011–12, 2013–14
