= Slavoljub Đorđević =

Serbian footballer

Personal information
- Date of birth: 15 February 1981 (age 45)
- Place of birth: Belgrade, SFR Yugoslavia
- Height: 1.85 m (6 ft 1 in)
- Position: Defender

Team information
- Current team: Napredak Kruševac (manager)

Youth career
- Red Star Belgrade

Senior career*
Years	Team	Apps	(Gls)
2000–2005	Red Star Belgrade	44	(0)
2001	→ Radnički Niš (loan)	12	(0)
2001–2002	→ Jedinstvo Ub (loan)	22	(1)
2002–2003	→ Leotar (loan)	30	(0)
2005–2007	Alania Vladikavkaz	8	(0)
2006	→ Volyn Lutsk (loan)	6	(0)
2006	→ Kryvbas Kryvyi Rih (loan)	9	(0)
2007–2008	Shinnik Yaroslavl	57	(5)
2009	Rheindorf Altach	13	(0)
2009–2011	Red Star Belgrade	33	(0)
2011–2012	Bunyodkor	26	(0)
Total		260	(6)

International career
2003	Serbia and Montenegro U21	3	(0)

Managerial career
- 2018–2020: Red Star Belgrade (youth)
- 2020–2021: Radnik Surdulica
- 2021–2022: Vojvodina
- 2022–2023: Radnik Surdulica
- 2023: Radnički Niš
- 2024–2025: Napredak Kruševac
- * Club domestic league appearances and goals

Slavoljub Đorđević (Serbian Cyrillic: Славољуб Ђорђевић; born 15 February 1981) is a Serbian professional football coach and a former defender who is the manager of Napredak Kruševac.

== Honours ==
Leotar

- Premier League of Bosnia and Herzegovina: 2002–03

Red Star Belgrade

- First League of Serbia and Montenegro: 2003–04
- Serbia and Montenegro Cup: 2003–04
- Serbian Cup: 2009–10

Bunyodkor

- Uzbek League: 2011
- Uzbekistan Cup: 2012

== Managerial statistics ==
As of match played 29 December 2023

Managerial record by team and tenure
Team	From	To	Record					
Team	From	To	P	W	D	L	Win %	
Radnik Surdulica	9 September 2020	6 June 2021	36	18	6	12	50.00	
Vojvodina	12 June 2021	12 March 2022	33	14	6	13	42.42	
Radnik Surdulica	29 December 2022	30 June 2023	20	8	6	6	40.00	
Radnički Niš	15 November 2023	26 December 2023	6	1	1	4	16.67	
Total			95	41	19	35	43.16	—
