= Dragan Dragutinović =

Serbian footballer

Personal information
- Full name: Dragan Dragutinović
- Date of birth: January 17, 1980 (age 46)
- Place of birth: Čačak, SFR Yugoslavia
- Height: 1.80 m (5 ft 11 in)
- Position: Defender

Senior career*
Years	Team	Apps	(Gls)
1997–2004	Borac Čačak	166	(16)
2004–2005	Vojvodina	37	(0)
2005–2010	Borac Čačak	105	(0)
2010	Metalac Gornji Milanovac	12	(0)
2010–2011	Okzhetpes	13	(1)
2011	Mladost Lučani	10	(1)
2012	Borac Čačak	0	(0)
2013	Sloboda Čačak	10	(0)
2013–2016	Serbian White Eagles		
2018–2020	Serbian White Eagles		
- * Club domestic league appearances and goals

Dragan Dragutinović (Serbian Cyrillic: Драган Драгутиновић; born 17 January 1980) is a Serbian retired footballer.

== Career ==
Born in Čačak, his previous clubs were FK Borac Čačak, FK Vojvodina and FK Metalac Gornji Milanovac in the Serbian SuperLiga. In 2008, he played in the 2008–09 UEFA Cup with Borac Cacak against FC Dacia Chișinău, PFC Lokomotiv Sofia, and AFC Ajax. He later played with FC Okzhetpes in the Kazakhstan Premier League and later with FK Mladost Lučani in the Serbian First League. In 2013, he went abroad to play in the Canadian Soccer League with Serbian White Eagles FC. In 2018, he returned to play with the Serbian White Eagles for the 2018 season. He re-signed with the White Eagles for the 2019 season.
