= Mohammed-Awal Issah =

Ghanaian footballer

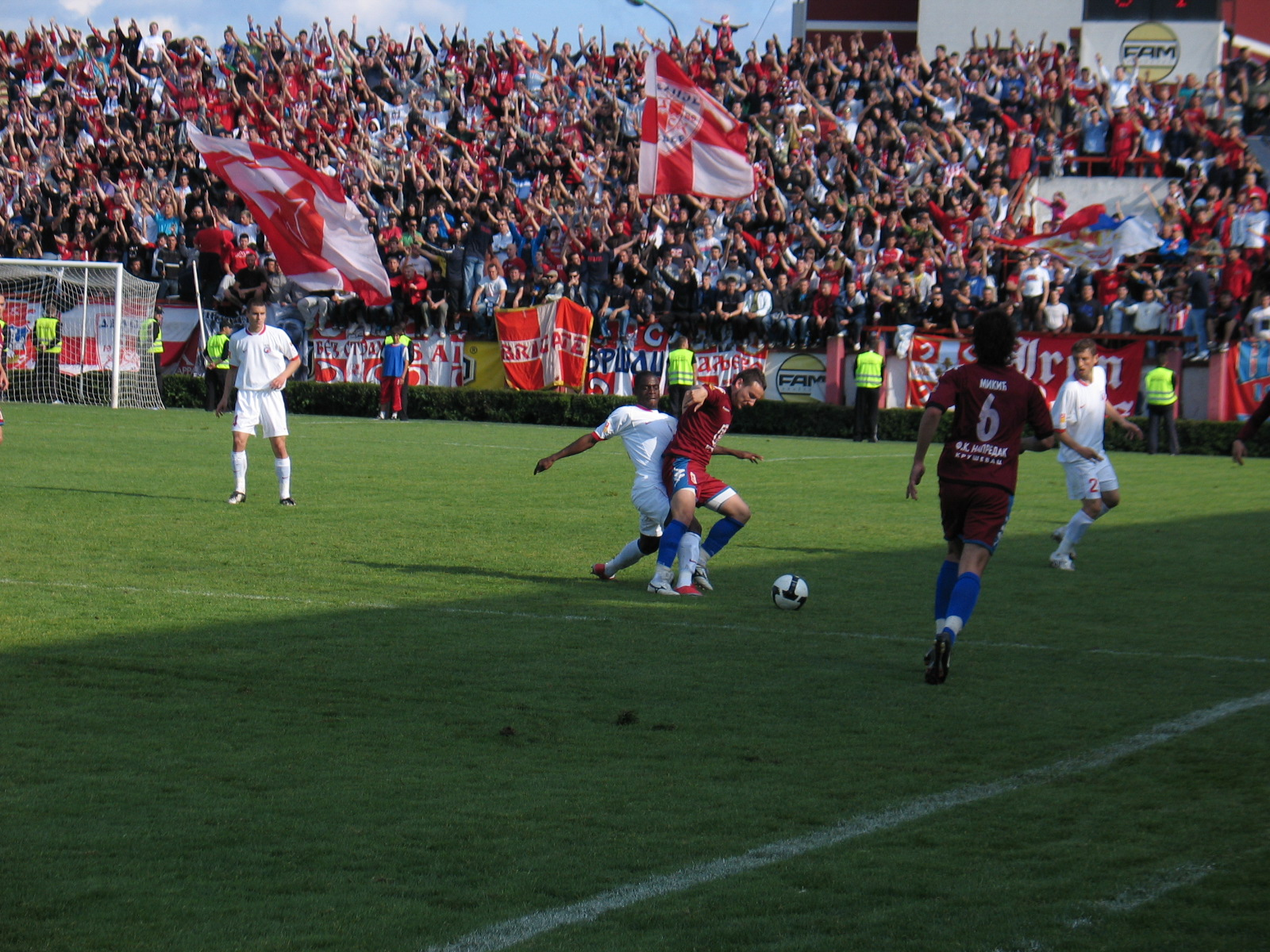
- Issah (in white) tackling Dušan Petronijević in 2009

Personal information
- Date of birth: 4 April 1986 (age 40)
- Place of birth: Accra, Ghana
- Height: 1.74 m (5 ft 9 in)
- Position: Defensive midfielder

Youth career
- Real Sportive

Senior career*
Years	Team	Apps	(Gls)
2007	Real Sportive	?	(?)
2007–2009	AmaZulu	34	(2)
2009–2011	Red Star Belgrade	65	(1)
2011–2013	Rosenborg	24	(0)
2013	→ Veria (loan)	0	(0)
2013–2014	AmaZulu	4	(0)

International career
2007	Ghana U-20		
- * Club domestic league appearances and goals

Mohammed-Awal Issah (born 4 April 1986) is a Ghanaian former professional footballer who played as a defensive midfielder.

== Club career ==
Issah began his career by Real Sportive before signing a two-year contract with AmaZulu in the South African PSL in August 2007.

On 10 October 2008, he went to Serbia for trials with Red Star Belgrade and in December 2008, he signed a 4.5-year contract with the club. In mid-May 2009, AmaZulu contacted FIFA stating they had not received the full transfer fee for Issah from Red Star Belgrade. Later that month, Issah, together with teammate and compatriot Bernard Parker sued Red Star Belgrade for failing to fulfil financial obligations. In January 2011, Issah was one of eight players told they were surplus to requirements.

In the 2011 summer transfer window, Issah signed for Norwegian club Rosenborg BK.

On 25 January 2013, Issah joined Greek Super League club Veria on a 1.5-year loan contract. After half a season, the loan was terminated.

On 1 August 2013, Issah re-joined AmaZulu after almost five years in European football while AmaZulu agreed a transfer deal with Rosenborg. In February 2014, the club reported him to the South African Football Association claiming he had disappeared. Two months later, Issah was fined $170,000 for going absent and received a four-month playing ban.

== International career ==
Issah was a member of the Ghana national under-20 team at the 2007 Toulon Tournament.

== Career statistics ==
=== Club ===
As of 30 May 2017

Appearances and goals by club, season and competition
Club	Season	League			Cup		Continental		Total	
Club	Season	Division	Apps	Goals	Apps	Goals	Apps	Goals	Apps	Goals
Red Star	2008–09	Serbian SuperLiga	16	0	0	0	0	0	16	0
Red Star	2009–10	Serbian SuperLiga	23	1	0	0	6	0	29	1
Red Star	2010–11	Serbian SuperLiga	26	0	4	1	1	0	31	1
Red Star	Total		65	1	4	1	7	0	76	2
Rosenborg	2011	Tippeligaen	12	0	1	0	2	0	15	0
Rosenborg	2012	Tippeligaen	12	0	1	0	9	0	23	0
Rosenborg	Total		24	0	2	0	11	0	37	0
AmaZulu	2013–2014	South African Premier Division	4	0	0	0	0	0	4	0
Career total			93	1	6	1	18	0	117	2

== Honours ==
Red Star

- Serbian Cup: 2010
