= Goran Dragović =

Bosnian-Herzegovinian footballer

Personal information
- Date of birth: 20 October 1981 (age 45)
- Place of birth: Sarajevo, SFR Yugoslavia
- Height: 1.87 m (6 ft 1 1/2 in)
- Position: Defender

Senior career*
Years	Team	Apps	(Gls)
2001–2002	Radnički Beograd	2	(0)
2002–2005	Voždovac	60	(22)
2006	Kazma		
2006–2008	Voždovac	47	(0)
2008–2011	Javor Ivanjica	57	(1)
2011–2013	Metalurg Skopje	62	(3)
2013–2014	Voždovac	19	(0)
2016	Zvezdara		
2016–2018	Hajduk Beograd		
- * Club domestic league appearances and goals as of 12 May 2014

Goran Dragović (Serbian Cyrillic: Горан Драговић; born 20 October 1981) is a Bosnian-Herzegovinian professional footballer.

== Club career ==
Born in Sarajevo, SR Bosnia and Herzegovina, he spent most of his career playing in Serbia. He made his professional debut with FK Radnički Beograd, however it was with FK Voždovac that he spent most time, 6 seasons. He later played for FK Javor Ivanjica in the Serbian SuperLiga before moving to FK Metalurg Skopje in the summer of 2011 to play in the Macedonian First League.

In July 2013 he returned to FK Voždovac who had just been promoted to the Serbian SuperLiga.
