= Milan Milojević =

Serbian footballer

Personal information
- Date of birth: 24 April 1989 (age 37)
- Place of birth: Smederevo, SFR Yugoslavia
- Position: Midfielder

Team information
- Current team: BSV Enzesfeld/Hirtenberg
- Number: 19

Youth career
- Smederevo

Senior career*
Years	Team	Apps	(Gls)
2007–2010	Smederevo	6	
2010–2012	OFK Mihajlovac		
2013–2015	Rudar Kostolac		
2015–2016	Smederevo		
2016-2021	SC-Pfaffstätten	97	(65)
2022–2023	SC Maria Lanzendorf	35	(6)
2023–	BSV Enzesfeld/Hirtenberg	32	(6)
- * Club domestic league appearances and goals as of 26 December 2024

Milan Milojević (Serbian Cyrillic: Mилан Mилојевић; born 24 April 1989 in Smederevo) is a Serbian football midfielder.

Previously he played for Smederevo (1 match in the Serbian SuperLiga season 2006–07, and 5 matches in the Serbian First League in the season 2008–09) and on loan at Morava Velika Plana in the first half of the 2009–10 season.
