= Rajko Mijović =

Serbian politician

Rajko Mijović (Serbian Cyrillic: Рајко Мијовић; born 1959) is a politician in Serbia. He served in the Assembly of Vojvodina from 2016 to 2020 as a member of the Social Democratic Party of Serbia (Socijaldemokratska partija Srbije, SDPS).

== Private and military career ==
Mijović holds a Ph.D. in Military Sciences. He was an officer in the Armed Forces of Yugoslavia and oversaw the air defence missile division in the Pančevo area during the 1999 NATO bombing of Yugoslavia. He continues to live in Pančevo.

== Politician ==
=== Early candidacies ===
Mijović sought election to the Pančevo municipal assembly in the 2000 Serbian local elections, running in the twenty-ninth division as a candidate of the Serbian Renewal Movement (Srpski pokret obnove, SPO). He was defeated by a candidate of the Democratic Opposition of Serbia (Demokratska opozicija Srbije, DOS).

He sought election to the Serbian national assembly in the 2003 parliamentary election on the electoral list of Odbrana i Pravda alliance. The list did not cross the electoral threshold to win any mandates. He subsequently appeared in the first position on a coalition list in Pančevo in the 2008 Serbian local elections, leading an alliance that comprised the Banat Party, the Pančevo Party, and the Vojvodina Green Party. This list, too, did not cross the threshold to win any mandates.

=== Social Democratic Party of Serbia ===
Mijović subsequently joined the SDPS, which contested the 2012 provincial and local elections in Vojvodina as part of the coalition around the Socialist Party of Serbia (Socijalistička partija Srbije, SPS). He received the fourth position on the Socialist list in the 2012 local elections and was elected to the city assembly when the list won twelve mandates. He also received the seventeenth position on the Socialist-led list for the concurrent provincial election and was not elected when the list won only nine mandates.

The SDPS subsequently switched its affiliation to the alliance around the Serbian Progressive Party (Srpska napredna stranka, SNS). Mijović was given the thirty-eighth position on the Progressive-led list in the 2016 provincial election and was this time elected when the list won a majority victory with sixty-three out of 120 mandates. He also received the tenth position on the Progressive list for the concurrent 2016 local elections in Pančevo and was re-elected when the list won a majority with thirty-nine out of seventy mandates. He served as president of the SDPS's board in Pančevo during this period.

He did not seek re-election at either the provincial or local level in 2020.

== Electoral record ==
=== Municipal (Pančevo) ===
2000 Pančevo municipal assembly election Pančevo XXIX – Gornji Grad II (constituency seat)
Sava Vukašinov	Democratic Movement for Pančevo	
Goran Vuković	Serbian Radical Party	
Savica Kolarski	Democratic Opposition of Serbia	elected
Rajko Mijović	Serbian Renewal Movement	
Miodrag Radojković	Socialist Party of Serbia–Yugoslav Left	
