= Goran Antelj =

Serbian footballer (born 1988)

Personal information
- Full name: Goran Antelj
- Date of birth: 6 April 1988 (age 38)
- Place of birth: Belgrade, SR Serbia, Yugoslavia
- Height: 1.85 m (6 ft 1 in)
- Position: Forward

Youth career
- –2005: OFK Beograd

Senior career*
Years	Team	Apps	(Gls)
2005–2008	OFK Beograd	1	(0)
2006–2007	→ Dinamo Pančevo (loan)	16	(4)
2008–2009	Palilulac Beograd	12	(2)
2008–2010	Warta Poznań	5	(0)
2009–2010	→ BSK Borča (loan)	0	(0)
2009–2010	→ Mladi Radnik (loan)	4	(0)
2010–2011	Teleoptik	25	(5)
2011–2013	Bežanija	56	(12)
2013	Metalac Gornji Milanovac	10	(0)
2014	Borac Starčevo		
2014	BSK Borča	10	(1)
2015	Bežanija	14	(2)
2015	Drina Zvornik	10	(0)
2016	Železničar Pančevo		
2017	SG Worringen	0	(0)
2017-2018	Vatanspor Solingen	24	(16)
2018	SV DITIB Solingen	4	(1)
2019	FC Leverkusen	11	(4)
- * Club domestic league appearances and goals

Goran Antelj (Serbian Cyrillic: Горан Антељ; born 6 April 1988) is a former Serbian professional footballer. In 2016, he was diagnosed with cancer.
