= Pavle Ninkov =

Serbian football right-back (born 1985)

Personal information
- Full name: Pavle Ninkov
- Date of birth: 20 April 1985 (age 41)
- Place of birth: Belgrade, SFR Yugoslavia
- Height: 1.81 m (5 ft 11 in)
- Position: Right-back

Senior career*
Years	Team	Apps	(Gls)
2003	Železničar Beograd	14	(3)
2004–2005	Radnički Beograd	27	(3)
2005	Rad	4	(0)
2006–2007	Čukarički	56	(4)
2008–2011	Red Star Belgrade	88	(3)
2011–2017	Toulouse	109	(1)
2018	Zemun	7	(0)

International career
2008–2012	Serbia	9	(0)
- * Club domestic league appearances and goals

Pavle Ninkov (Serbian Cyrillic: Павле Нинков, born 20 April 1985) is a Serbian retired football right-back. His former clubs include Radnički Beograd, Rad, Čukarički, and Ligue 1 side Toulouse FC. In international competition, Ninkov has represented Serbia.

== Club career ==
=== Red Star Belgrade ===
In January 2008, he joined Red Star Belgrade from FK Čukarički. Ninkov was given the number 24 shirt for Red Star Belgrade and became an integral member of the squad. During the 2010–11 season he was promoted to team captain.

=== Toulouse ===
On 21 June 2011, he joined Toulouse FC, signing a four-year contract with the club.

Ninkov began the 2013–14 season playing 13 league matches, starting eight times. In December 2013, Toulouse announced he would be out of action for three weeks due to a foot injury.

He was released by the club at the end of the 2016–17 season.

=== Zemun ===
In February 2018, Ninkov signed for FK Zemun.

== International career ==
Ninkov made his debut for the Serbia national football team on 6 February 2008 during a friendly match away against Macedonia. Ninkov was then called up by coach Miroslav Đukić to represent Serbia's Olympic football team at the 2008 Summer Olympics in Beijing, but did not participate.

On 11 November 2011, in a friendly match against Mexico, Mexican TV referred to Ninkov as "Pablo Ninkon".

== Career statistics ==
As of 3 December 2017

Club	Season	League			Cup		Continental		Other		Total	
Club	Season	Division	Apps	Goals	Apps	Goals	Apps	Goals	Apps	Goals	Apps	Goals
Serbia			League		Serbian Cup		Europe		Other		Total	
Red Star	2007–08	SuperLiga	14	0	2	0	0	0	–		16	0
Red Star	2008–09	SuperLiga	26	1	1	0	2	0	–		29	1
Red Star	2009–10	SuperLiga	25	1	4	0	6	0	–		35	1
Red Star	2010–11	SuperLiga	23	1	4	0	2	0	–		29	1
Red Star	Total		88	3	11	0	10	0	0	0	109	3
France			League		Coupe de France		Europe		Coupe de la Ligue		Total	
Toulouse	2011–12	Ligue 1	29	0	1	0	0	0	1	0	31	0
Toulouse	2012–13	Ligue 1	21	0	1	0	0	0	2	0	24	0
Toulouse	2013–14	Ligue 1	19	0	0	0	0	0	1	0	20	0
Toulouse	2014–15	Ligue 1	21	1	1	0	0	0	1	0	23	1
Toulouse	2015–16	Ligue 1	10	0	1	0	0	0	1	0	12	0
Toulouse	2016–17	Ligue 1	9	0	0	0	0	0	1	0	10	0
Toulouse	Total		109	1	4	0	0	0	7	0	120	1
Career total			197	4	15	0	10	0	7	0	229	4
