= Ognjen Koroman =

Serbian footballer and manager

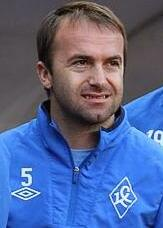
- Koroman with Krylia Sovetov Samara in 2011

Personal information
- Full name: Ognjen Koroman
- Date of birth: 19 September 1978 (age 48)
- Place of birth: Pale, SR Bosnia and Herzegovina, Yugoslavia
- Height: 1.77 m (5 ft 10 in)
- Position: Winger

Youth career
- Željezničar
- Red Star Belgrade

Senior career*
Years	Team	Apps	(Gls)
1997–1998	Radnički Kragujevac	41	(1)
1999–2000	Spartak Subotica	39	(3)
2000–2001	OFK Beograd	46	(4)
2002–2003	Dynamo Moscow	38	(12)
2003–2005	Krylia Sovetov Samara	50	(3)
2005–2006	Terek Grozny	6	(1)
2006	→ Portsmouth (loan)	4	(1)
2007–2009	Red Star Belgrade	63	(12)
2009–2010	Incheon United	22	(4)
2010–2011	Red Star Belgrade	23	(2)
2011–2013	Krylia Sovetov Samara	9	(1)
Total		341	(44)

International career
2002–2007	Serbia (Note: Including 27 caps and 1 goal for Serbia and Montenegro (known as FR Yugoslavia until 2003))	36	(1)

Managerial career
- 2019: Žarkovo
- 2019–2020: Smederevo 1924
- 2022: Tekstilac Derventa
- * Club domestic league appearances and goals

Ognjen Koroman (Serbian Cyrillic: Огњен Короман, pronounced [ǒɡɲen kǒroman]; born 19 September 1978) is a Serbian football manager and current professional player for FK Ježevica in Serbian lower league Zona Drina.

As a player, he represented Serbia and Montenegro at the 2006 FIFA World Cup.

== Club career ==
After coming through the youth systems Željezničar and Red Star Belgrade, Koroman played for Radnički Kragujevac, Spartak Subotica, and OFK Beograd in the First League of FR Yugoslavia. He spent a year and a half with each side, before moving abroad in the 2002 winter transfer window.

While playing for Russian Premier League clubs Dynamo Moscow, Krylia Sovetov Samara, and Terek Grozny, Koroman amassed 94 appearances and scored 16 goals in the top flight, being named in the league's best 33 players for the 2002 season.

In January 2006, Koroman moved on loan to English club Portsmouth. He made three appearances for the side in the league, scoring on the final day of the season in a 3–1 loss to Liverpool. In August of the same year, Koroman returned to Portsmouth on a season-long loan. He appeared in three games before leaving the club in the 2007 winter transfer window.

In February 2007, Koroman returned to Serbia and joined his parent club Red Star Belgrade on a seven-month loan deal. He helped the side win the double in the 2006–07 season. In August 2007, Koroman signed a permanent contract with the club.

In July 2009, Koroman moved to Asia and signed with Korean club Incheon United. He thus rejoined his former manager Ilija Petković. In June 2010, Koroman returned to Red Star Belgrade, penning a two-year contract. However, he left the club after just one season.

In June 2011, Koroman returned to Russia and joined his former club Krylia Sovetov Samara, signing a two-and-a-half-year deal. He appeared in nine league games and scored one goal in the first half of the 2011–12 season, before being demoted to the youth squad. In June 2013, Koroman said that he would end his career after his contract with Krylia expires in December of that year.

In 2025, Koroman came back from retirement and signed with Serbian club FK Ježevica, that plays in Zona Drina, fourth tier of Serbian football.

== International career ==
Koroman was capped 36 times and scored once for Serbia (and its predecessors) from 2002 to 2007. He was a member of the Serbia and Montenegro team in the 2006 FIFA World Cup, making two appearances and receiving two yellow cards in the process. His final international was an August 2007 European Championship qualification match away against Belgium.

== Managerial career ==
=== Žarkovo ===
Koroman started off his managerial career at Serbian First League club Žarkovo, being appointed manager on 21 May 2019. He started off well, as his team beat Budućnost Dobanovci 4–0 in his first game in charge. However, things changed quickly, as in the next 14 games with Koroman as manager, Žarkovo managed to win only three more games, while from September to October, the team didn't manage to win any game. These results made Koroman resign on 17 October 2019, not even five months after becoming manager.

=== Smederevo 1924 ===
On 28 December 2019, two months after leaving Žarkovo, Koroman became manager of fellow Serbian First League club Smederevo 1924.

== Career statistics ==
=== Club ===
Appearances and goals by club, season and competition
Club	Season	League		
Club	Season	Division	Apps	Goals
Radnički Kragujevac	1997–98	First League of FR Yugoslavia	32	0
Radnički Kragujevac	1998–99	First League of FR Yugoslavia	9	1
Radnički Kragujevac	Total		41	1
Spartak Subotica	1998–99	First League of FR Yugoslavia	6	1
Spartak Subotica	1999–2000	First League of FR Yugoslavia	33	2
Spartak Subotica	Total		39	3
OFK Beograd	2000–01	First League of FR Yugoslavia	29	1
OFK Beograd	2001–02	First League of FR Yugoslavia	17	3
OFK Beograd	Total		46	4
Dynamo Moscow	2002	Russian Premier League	24	6
Dynamo Moscow	2003	Russian Premier League	14	6
Dynamo Moscow	Total		38	12
Krylia Sovetov Samara	2003	Russian Premier League	6	1
Krylia Sovetov Samara	2004	Russian Premier League	26	1
Krylia Sovetov Samara	2005	Russian Premier League	18	1
Krylia Sovetov Samara	Total		50	3
Terek Grozny	2005	Russian Premier League	6	1
Portsmouth (loan)	2005–06	Premier League	3	1
Portsmouth (loan)	2006–07	Premier League	1	0
Portsmouth (loan)	Total		4	1
Red Star Belgrade (loan)	2006–07	Serbian SuperLiga	12	2
Red Star Belgrade	2007–08	Serbian SuperLiga	30	6
Red Star Belgrade	2008–09	Serbian SuperLiga	21	4
Red Star Belgrade	Total		51	10
Incheon United	2009	K League	10	3
Incheon United	2010	K League	12	1
Incheon United	Total		22	4
Red Star Belgrade	2010–11	Serbian SuperLiga	23	2
Krylia Sovetov Samara	2011–12	Russian Premier League	9	1
Krylia Sovetov Samara	2012–13	Russian Premier League	0	0
Krylia Sovetov Samara	Total		9	1
Career total			341	44

=== International ===
Appearances and goals by national team and year
National team	Year	Apps	Goals
FR Yugoslavia; Serbia and Montenegro; Serbia
FR Yugoslavia; Serbia and Montenegro; Serbia	2002	8	0
FR Yugoslavia; Serbia and Montenegro; Serbia	2003	0	0
FR Yugoslavia; Serbia and Montenegro; Serbia	2004	5	1
FR Yugoslavia; Serbia and Montenegro; Serbia	2005	10	0
FR Yugoslavia; Serbia and Montenegro; Serbia	2006	10	0
FR Yugoslavia; Serbia and Montenegro; Serbia	2007	3	0
Total		36	1

== Managerial statistics ==
As of 19 November 2022

Managerial record by team and tenure
Team	From	To	Record							
Team	From	To	G	W	D	L	GF	GA	GD	Win %
Žarkovo	21 May 2019	17 October 2019	15	4	5	6	16	16	+0	26.67
Smederevo 1924	28 December 2019	28 May 2020	3	0	3	0	1	1	+0	0.00
Tekstilac Derventa	6 September 2022	19 November 2022	12	3	3	6	13	16	−3	25.00
Total			30	7	11	12	30	33	−3	23.33

== Honours ==
=== Player ===
Red Star Belgrade

- Serbian SuperLiga: 2006–07
- Serbian Cup: 2006–07

=== Individual ===
Awards

- Serbian SuperLiga Team of the Season: 2008–09

== Political activities ==
Koroman is a strong critic of the ruling Serbian Progressive Party (SNS) and called it the "greatest evil". On 17 March 2021, Koroman was elected vice president of the People's Party (NS) sports committee. Dragan J. Vučićević, editor of the pro-government tabloid Informer, accused Koroman of physically attacking him and insulting him on 30 May 2023.
