= Sávio (footballer, born 1984) =

Brazilian footballer

Personal information
- Full name: Sávio Oliveira do Vale
- Date of birth: 1 November 1984 (age 42)
- Place of birth: Rio Grande, Brazil
- Height: 1.91 m (6 ft 3 in)
- Position: Defensive midfielder

Youth career
- 2004: São Paulo

Senior career*
Years	Team	Apps	(Gls)
2004–2006	Pelotas	0	(0)
2006–2007	Porto Alegre	0	(0)
2007–2009	Zeta	51	(6)
2009–2011	Red Star Belgrade	37	(4)
2011	→ Changchun Yatai (loan)	0	(0)
2012	Avenida	6	(0)
2013	Esportivo	6	(0)
2017	Sport Club São Paulo	3	(0)
- * Club domestic league appearances and goals

Sávio Oliveira do Vale (born 11 November 1984) is a Brazilian former professional footballer who played as a midfielder.

== Career ==
Born in Rio Grande, he played in the youth team of Sport Club São Paulo. His career as senior begin in 2005 with Esporte Clube Pelotas. After two seasons he moved to Porto Alegre Futebol Clube. In 2007, he moved abroad by signing with FK Zeta, playing in the Montenegrin First League.

In June 2009, he signed for Red Star Belgrade, along with Cadú, having both been playing together since 2007, first in Porto Alegre then in Zeta. After almost two seasons playing for Red Star Belgrade, he was loaned to Chinese side Changchun Yatai on 26 January 2011. The Chinese club later stated that they terminated this deal with Savio. In the summer of 2011, he returned to Red Star.

== Career statistics ==
As of 23 November 2011

Appearances and goals by club, season and competition
Club	Season	League			Cup (Note: Includes Serbian Cup.)		Continental		Total	
Club	Season	Division	Apps	Goals	Apps	Goals	Apps	Goals	Apps	Goals
Red Star Belgrade	2009–10	SuperLiga	27	3	0	0	0	0	27	3
Red Star Belgrade	2010–11	SuperLiga	9	1	1	0	0	0	10	1
Red Star Belgrade	2011–12	SuperLiga	1	0	1	0	0	0	2	0
Career total			37	4	2	0	0	0	39	4
