= Nikola Mikić =

Serbian footballer

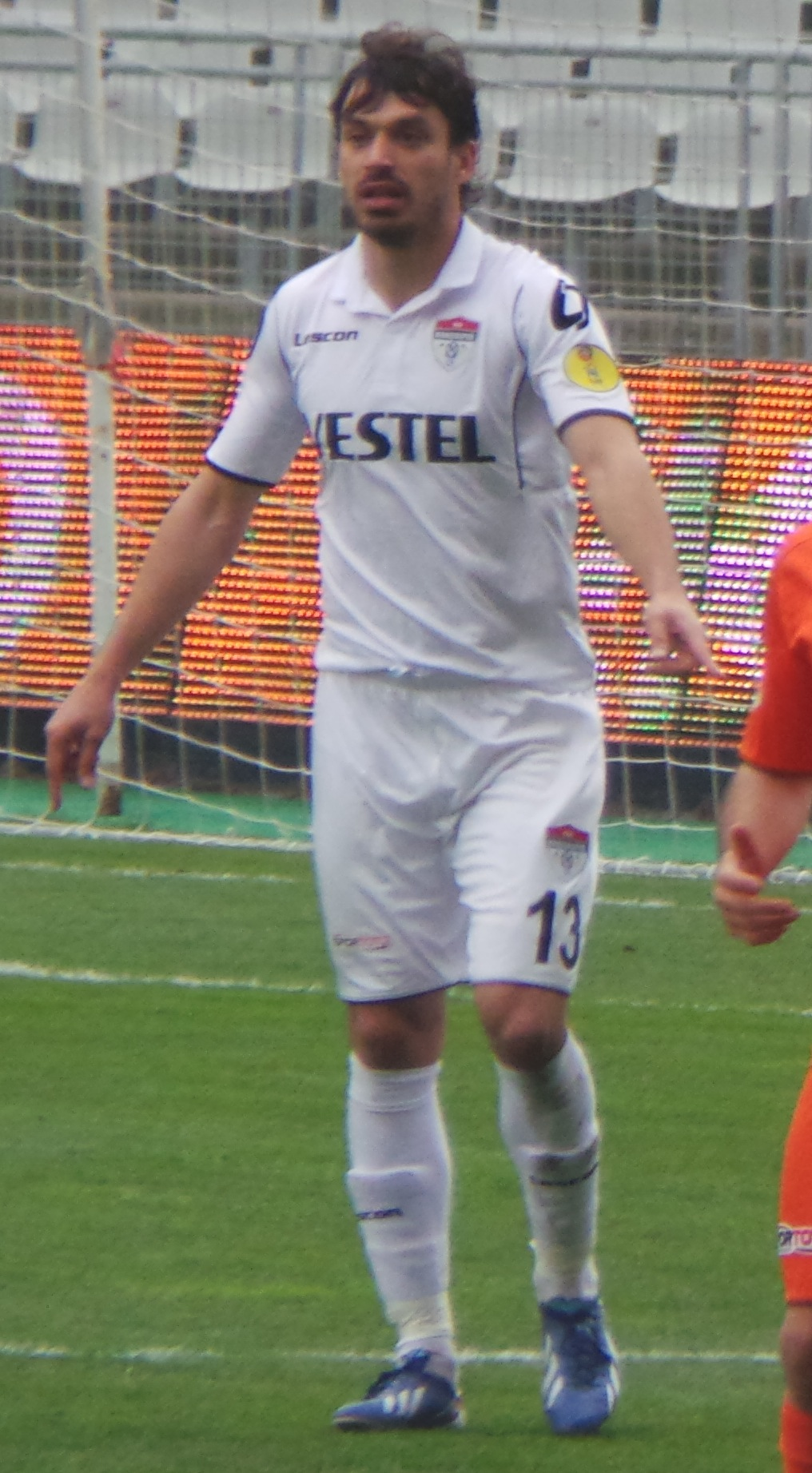
- Mikić with Manisaspor in 2014

Personal information
- Full name: Nikola Mikić
- Date of birth: 13 September 1985 (age 41)
- Place of birth: Kraljevo, SFR Yugoslavia
- Height: 1.82 m (6 ft 0 in)
- Positions: Right-back; centre-back

Senior career*
Years	Team	Apps	(Gls)
2003–2004	Policajac	23	(1)
2004–2005	Posavac	28	(2)
2005–2008	Radnički Niš	69	(1)
2008–2009	Napredak Kruševac	47	(0)
2010–2013	Red Star Belgrade	67	(7)
2013–2015	Manisaspor	57	(4)
2015	OFK Beograd	11	(2)
2016	AEL Kalloni	11	(0)
2016–2017	OFI	5	(1)
2017–2018	Manisaspor	20	(1)
2018–2020	Voždovac	49	(1)
2020	Grafičar Beograd	14	(2)
Total		401	(22)

Managerial career
- 2024–: Red Star Belgrade (assistant)
- * Club domestic league appearances and goals as of 22 January 2021

Nikola Mikić (Serbian Cyrillic: Никола Микић; born 13 September 1985) is a Serbian retired professional footballer who played as a defender.

== Career ==
Mikić played for Radnički Niš and Napredak Kruševac, before transferring to Red Star Belgrade in the 2010 winter transfer window. He spent three and a half years with the club and won two Serbian Cups (2000 and 2012). In the summer of 2013, Mikić moved abroad for the first time and joined Turkish club Manisaspor, spending there the next two seasons.

Since 22 December 2023, he has been an assistant coach at Red Star Belgrade.

== Honours ==
Red Star Belgrade

- Serbian Cup: 2009–10, 2011–12
