= Cadú (footballer, born 1986) =

Brazilian footballer

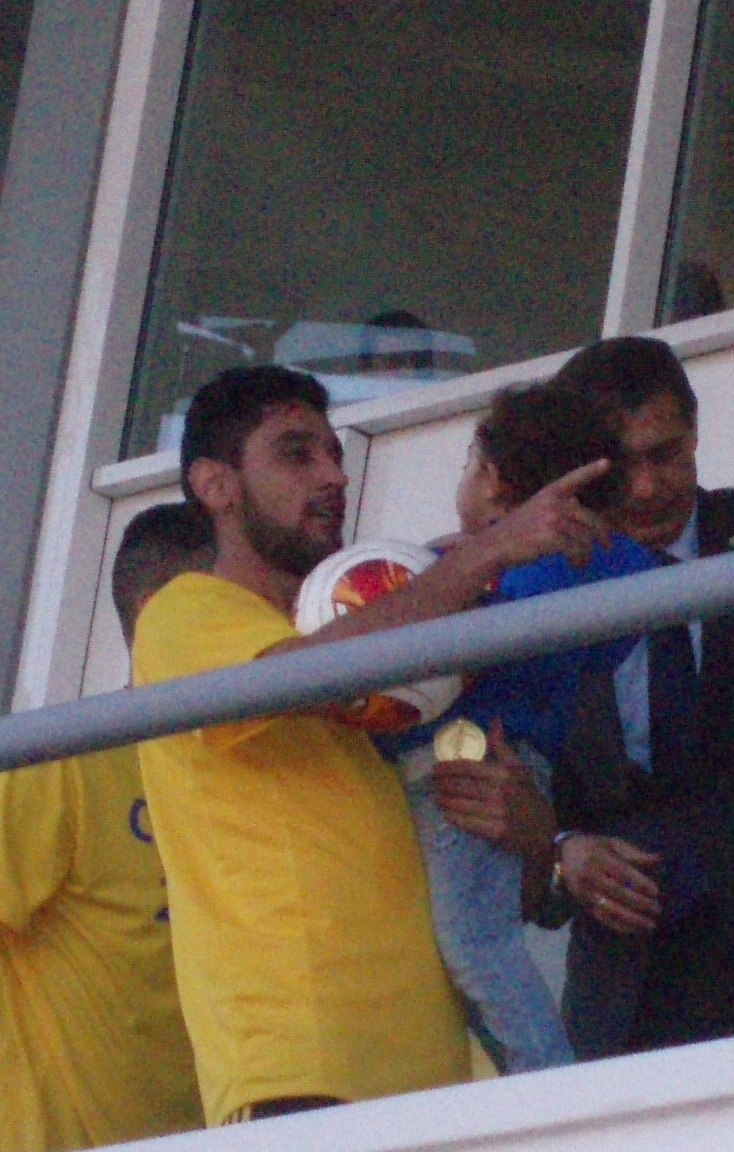
- Cadú with Sheriff Tiraspol in 2014

Personal information
- Full name: Carlos Eduardo de Fiori Mendes
- Date of birth: 31 August 1986 (age 40)
- Place of birth: Andradina, São Paulo, Brazil
- Height: 1.77 m (5 ft 10 in)
- Position: Attacking midfielder

Senior career*
Years	Team	Apps	(Gls)
2005–2007	Porto Alegre	0	(0)
2007–2009	Zeta	51	(15)
2009–2013	Red Star Belgrade	80	(21)
2013–2016	Sheriff Tiraspol	58	(11)
2016–2017	Akhaa Ahli Aley	13	(5)
2017–2019	Balzan	34	(5)
Total		236	(57)
- * Club domestic league appearances and goals

Carlos Eduardo de Fiori Mendes (born 31 August 1986), commonly known as Cadú, is a Brazilian former professional footballer who played as an attacking midfielder.

== Career ==
=== Early career ===
Born in Andradina, Brazil, Cadú started his senior career in his homeland by playing with Campinas Futebol Clube and Porto Alegre. He left Brazil and moved to Montenegro in summer 2007 by joining Montenegrin First League side FK Zeta where he played the following two seasons.

=== Red Star Belgrade ===
Cadú and Sávio had been teammates since 2007, first in Porto Alegre, then in Zeta, when both were signed by Serbian side Red Star Belgrade in June 2009. Cadú signed a four-year contract with Red Star, earning €200,000 per season. Cadú played an important role in Red Star's matches during the qualification for the UEFA Europa League since he joined the team in 2009. His first goal for Red Star Belgrade in any UEFA league was scored against Dinamo Tbilisi in the second qualifying round of the Europa League. In the third qualifying round of the 2010–11 UEFA Europa League qualifying phase and play-off round, he scored a goal against Slovan Bratislava. In a Belgrade Derby match on 5 May 2012, Red Star won against its eternal rival Partizan by 1–0, with Cadú scoring the decisive 90th-minute goal from over 20 meters out. By the end of his career at Red Star, he was the top scorer foreign player, and also a foreign player with most appearances in Red Star Belgrade's history.

=== Sheriff Tiraspol ===
Cadú joined Sheriff Tiraspol on 17 June 2013, through a Bosman move after his contract at Red Star wasn't renewed. In the 2013-14 UEFA Champions League second qualifying round, Cadú scored his first goal for Sheriff in a 5–0 win against FK Sutjeska Nikšić. He played as a starting player throughout Sheriff's 2013-14 Europa League group stage campaign, and scored a goal against Tromsø in Tiraspol. On 21 March 2016, Cadú left Sheriff abruptly due to a family circumstance.

== Career statistics ==
As of match played 10 December 2016

Appearances and goals by club, season and competition
Club	Season	League			National cup		Continental		Other		Total	
Club	Season	Division	Apps	Goals	Apps	Goals	Apps	Goals	Apps	Goals	Apps	Goals
Red Star Belgrade	2009–10	SuperLiga	21	3	3	1	4	2	0	0	28	6
Red Star Belgrade	2010–11	SuperLiga	26	5	4	0	2	1	0	0	32	6
Red Star Belgrade	2011–12	SuperLiga	20	11	2	0	4	1	0	0	26	12
Red Star Belgrade	2012–13	SuperLiga	13	2	0	0	3	0	0	0	16	2
Red Star Belgrade	Total		80	21	10	1	13	4	0	0	102	26
Sheriff Tiraspol	2013–14	Divizia Națională	23	7	3	0	11	2	1	0	13	13
Sheriff Tiraspol	2014–15	Divizia Națională	18	3	3	0	6	0	1	0	30	9
Sheriff Tiraspol	2015–16	Divizia Națională	18	1	0	0	2	0	1	1	21	5
Sheriff Tiraspol	Total		59	11	6	0	19	3	3	1	87	15
Career total			139	32	16	0	32	7	3	1	189	41

== Honours ==
Sheriff Tiraspol

- Moldovan National Division: 2013–14
- Moldovan Super Cup: 2014

Red Star

- Serbian Cup: 2009–10, 2011–12
