= Milan Vignjević =

Serbian footballer

Personal information
- Date of birth: 30 March 1989 (age 37)
- Place of birth: Zagreb, SR Croatia, SFR Yugoslavia
- Height: 1.86 m (6 ft 1 in)
- Position: Midfielder

Youth career
- 2000–2007: Partizan

Senior career*
Years	Team	Apps	(Gls)
2007–2008	Radnički Obrenovac	24	(3)
2008	Šumadija Jagnjilo	9	(1)
2009	Sopot	12	(1)
2009	Rad	0	(0)
2010–2012	BSK Borča	57	(6)
2012–2013	Napredak Kruševac	8	(3)
2013–2014	Metalac Gornji Milanovac	8	(0)
2014–2015	Naxxar Lions	12	(0)
2015	Radnik Bijeljina	1	(0)
2015	Dinamo Vranje	7	(0)
2016-2017	Radnički Obrenovac		
2018-2022	Borac Čačak		
2022	Zvezda Konatice		
- * Club domestic league appearances and goals as of 23 January 2016

Milan Vignjević (born 30 March 1989) is a Serbian football retired left winger.

== Club career ==
Born in Zagreb, SR Croatia, he played with FK Radnički Obrenovac, FK Šumadija Jagnjilo and Sopot until summer 2009 when he joined Serbian SuperLiga side FK Rad. During the winter break of the 2009–10 season, he moved to the newly promoted FK BSK Borča where he played in the following two and a half seasons. In summer 2012, he moved to FK Napredak Kruševac until the 1 February 2013 where he joined Metalac Gornji Milanovac. During the winter transfer window of the 2013/2014 season he joined Naxxar lions until the 2014/2015 winter transfer window in which he joined Radnik Bijeljina but will leave shortly after in the 2015/2016 summer transfer window to join Dinamo Vranje, in winter 2016 he moved to Radnicki Obrenovac which he stayed 4 seasons.

== Video ==
- http://www.dailymotion.com/video/x1bhkml_milan-vignjevic_sport
- https://www.youtube.com/watch?v=bKIklxgxt5g
