= Miloš Stepandić =

Serbian footballer

Personal information
- Date of birth: 21 October 1990 (age 36)
- Place of birth: Šabac, SFR Yugoslavia
- Height: 1.94 m (6 ft 4 in)
- Position: Goalkeeper

Senior career*
Years	Team	Apps	(Gls)
2007–2009	Mačva Šabac	44	(0)
2010–2011	Rad	0	(0)
2011	→ Mačva Šabac (loan)	13	(0)
2011–2015	Mačva Šabac	104	(0)
2015	→ Zemun (loan)	7	(0)
2016	OFK Bačka	18	(0)
2017-2020	Železničar Lajkovac		
- * Club domestic league appearances and goals as of 30 December 2016

Miloš Stepandić (Serbian Cyrillic: Милош Степандић; born 21 October 1990) is a Serbian retired football goalkeeper.
