= Igor Mijović =

Serbian footballer

Personal information
- Full name: Igor Mijović
- Date of birth: 11 July 1985 (age 41)
- Place of birth: Belgrade, SFR Yugoslavia
- Height: 1.81 m (5 ft 11 1/2 in)
- Position: Forward

Youth career
- Red Star Belgrade

Senior career*
Years	Team	Apps	(Gls)
2003–2014	Red Star Belgrade	0	(0)
2003–2004	→ Hajduk Beograd (loan)	10	(1)
2004	→ Srem (loan)	2	(0)
2005	→ Hajduk Beograd (loan)	12	(0)
2006–2007	→ Hajduk Beograd (loan)	0	(0)
2007–2008	→ Lisović (loan)	?	(?)
2008–2009	→ Hajduk Beograd (loan)	10	(0)
2010	→ Mladi Radnik (loan)	1	(0)
2011	→ Dorćol (loan)	3	(0)
2012	→ Hajduk Beograd (loan)	17	(5)
2013	→ Srem (loan)	6	(0)
2014–2021	Hajduk Beograd	35	(17)
- * Club domestic league appearances and goals as of 22 June 2015

Igor Mijović (Serbian Cyrillic: Игор Мијовић, born 11 July 1985) is a Serbian retired footballer.

Born in Belgrade, he was Red Star Belgrade player for a decade but never debuted for team in the league but instead playing on loan at several Serbian clubs. Among those clubs, he played with FK Hajduk Beograd in the 2004–05 First League of Serbia and Montenegro and later has made one appearance while on loan at FK Mladi Radnik in their only season in the Serbian SuperLiga in 2009–10.
