= Nemanja Cvetković (footballer, born 1980) =

Serbian footballer

Personal information
- Full name: Nemanja Cvetković
- Date of birth: 8 February 1980 (age 46)
- Place of birth: Belgrade, SFR Yugoslavia
- Height: 1.79 m (5 ft 10 1/2 in)
- Position: Right-back

Youth career
- Red Star Belgrade

Senior career*
Years	Team	Apps	(Gls)
1999–2001	Mladi Radnik		
2001–2002	Čukarički	25	(2)
2002–2003	Mladi Radnik	45	(4)
2003–2004	Vojvodina	8	(0)
2005	Obilić	5	(0)
2006	Radomiak	12	(0)
2006–2007	Smederevo	17	(1)
2007	Wohlen	12	(1)
2008	Winterthur	14	(0)
2008–2009	UR Namur	19	(2)
2009–2010	Red Star Belgrade	4	(0)
2011	Neman Grodno	10	(0)
2012–2013	Srem		
2013	Trikala		
2014	BASK		
2014–2015	Dorćol		
2015–2016	Hajduk Beograd		
- * Club domestic league appearances and goals

Nemanja Cvetković (Serbian Cyrillic: Немања Цветковић; born 8 February 1980) is a Serbian retired footballer who played as a right-back.
