= Aleksandar Jevtić =

Serbian footballer

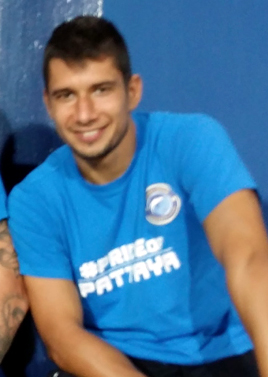
- Jevtić in 2017

Personal information
- Full name: Aleksandar Jevtić
- Date of birth: 30 March 1985 (age 41)
- Place of birth: Šabac, SFR Yugoslavia
- Height: 1.81 m (5 ft 11 in)
- Position: Forward

Senior career*
Years	Team	Apps	(Gls)
2003–2004	Balkan Bukovica	30	(11)
2004–2005	Smederevo	6	(0)
2005	Železničar Smederevo	13	(2)
2005–2007	Mačva Šabac	45	(13)
2007	Borac Čačak	11	(5)
2007–2009	Gençlerbirliği OFTAŞ	6	(0)
2008	→ Borac Čačak (loan)	15	(3)
2008–2009	→ OFK Beograd (loan)	28	(8)
2009–2011	Red Star Belgrade	50	(12)
2011–2013	Jiangsu Sainty	73	(21)
2014	Liaoning Hongyun	24	(3)
2015	BATE Borisov	7	(1)
2016	Jagodina	15	(2)
2016–2017	Čukarički	25	(6)
2017	Pattaya United	13	(8)
2018–2019	Voždovac	18	(4)
Total		379	(99)

International career
2008	Serbia	1	(0)
- * Club domestic league appearances and goals

Aleksandar Jevtić (Serbian Cyrillic: Aлекcaндap Jeвтић, pronounced [aleksǎːndar jěːʋtitɕ, alěksaːn-]; born 30 March 1985) is a Serbian retired football striker.

== International career ==
Jevtić made his debut for Serbia in a December 2008 friendly match away against Poland, coming on as a 58th-minute substitute for Miloš Bogunović. It remained his only international appearance.

== Career statistics ==
As of 21 September 2019

Appearances and goals by club, season and competition
Club	Season	League			Cup		League Cup		Continental		Total	
Club	Season	Division	Apps	Goals	Apps	Goals	Apps	Goals	Apps	Goals	Apps	Goals
Borac Čačak	2006–07	Serbian SuperLiga	11	5	0	0	—		—		11	5
Gençlerbirliği OFTAŞ	2007–08	Süper Lig	6	0	0	0	—		—		6	0
Borac Čačak (loan)	2007–08	Serbian SuperLiga	15	3	0	0	—		—		15	3
OFK Beograd (loan)	2008–09	Serbian SuperLiga	28	8	0	0	—		—		28	8
Red Star Belgrade	2009–10	Serbian SuperLiga	28	10	3	2	—		3	2	34	14
Red Star Belgrade	2010–11	Serbian SuperLiga	22	2	4	0	—		2	0	28	2
Red Star Belgrade	Total		50	12	7	2	—		5	2	62	16
Jiangsu Sainty	2011	Chinese Super League	17	11	0	0	—		—		17	11
Jiangsu Sainty	2012	Chinese Super League	28	6	1	0	—		0	0	29	6
Jiangsu Sainty	2013	Chinese Super League	28	4	2	2	—		6	0	36	6
Jiangsu Sainty	Total		73	21	3	2	—		6	0	82	23
Liaoning Whowin	2014	Chinese Super League	24	2	0	0	—		—		24	2
BATE Borisov	2015	Belarusian Premier League	7	1	1	1	—		0	0	8	1
Jagodina	2015–16	Serbian SuperLiga	15	2	1	0	—		—		16	2
Čukarički	2016–17	Serbian SuperLiga	25	6	1	0	—		—		27	6
Samut Prakan City	2017	Thai Premier League	13	8	1	0	1	1	—		15	9
Voždovac	2018–19	Serbian SuperLiga	11	1	1	0	—		—		12	1
Voždovac	2019–20	Serbian SuperLiga	7	3	0	0	—		—		7	3
Voždovac	Total		18	4	1	0	—		—		19	4
Career total			285	72	15	5	1	1	11	2	312	80
