= Nenad Srećković =

Serbian footballer

Personal information
- Full name: Nenad Srećković
- Date of birth: 11 April 1988 (age 38)
- Place of birth: Gornji Milanovac, SFR Yugoslavia
- Height: 1.79 m (5 ft 10 1/2 in)
- Positions: Left winger; left back

Team information
- Current team: Drina Zvornik (manager)

Youth career
- –2005: Red Star Belgrade

Senior career*
Years	Team	Apps	(Gls)
2005–2011	Red Star Belgrade	2	(0)
2005–2006	→ Tavankut (loan)	9	(3)
2006–2007	→ Rad (loan)	9	(0)
2007–2008	→ Napredak Kruševac (loan)	6	(1)
2008–2009	→ Srem (loan)	29	(3)
2010	→ Mladi Radnik (loan)	12	(0)
2010–2011	→ Napredak Kruševac (loan)	17	(4)
2011–2013	De Graafschap	22	(0)
2012	→ Fredrikstad (loan)	12	(2)
2014	Rad	11	(0)
2014–2015	Koper	15	(0)
2015	Kolubara	9	(0)
2016–2018	Radnik Bijeljina	52	(4)
2018–2019	Krško	18	(0)
2019	Radnik Bijeljina	3	(0)
2019–2020	Aspropyrgos	22	(3)
2020-2021	Aiolikos		
2021-2022	Jedinstvo Ub		
2022-2023	Radnik Bijeljina		
2024	Drina Zvornik		

Managerial career
- 2025-: Drina Zvornik (caretaker)
- * Club domestic league appearances and goals as of 12 August 2020

Nenad Srećković (Serbian Cyrillic: Ненад Срећковић; born 11 April 1988) is a Serbian retired footballer.

In August 2011, Srećković signed a three-year deal with Dutch side De Graafschap.

== Honours ==
=== Club ===
Koper

- Slovenian Cup: 2014–15

Radnik Bijeljina

- Bosnian Cup: 2015–16
- Republika Srpska Cup: 2015–16, 2016–17, 2017–18, 2018–19
