= Marko Mugoša =

Montenegrin footballer

Personal information
- Full name: Marko Mugoša
- Date of birth: 4 April 1984 (age 42)
- Place of birth: Titograd, SFR Yugoslavia
- Height: 1.82 m (6 ft 0 in)
- Position: Midfielder

Senior career*
Years	Team	Apps	(Gls)
2002–2008	Budućnost	124	(8)
2008–2010	Borac Čačak	50	(6)
2010–2012	Red Star Belgrade	1	(0)
2010	→ Budućnost (loan)	8	(1)
2011	→ Jagodina (loan)	14	(0)
2011	→ Novi Pazar (loan)	9	(1)
2012–2013	Borac Čačak	23	(1)
2013–2014	Mogren	25	(2)
2015	Landskrona	5	(0)
2015	Grbalj	9	(0)
2016–2017	Kom	2	(0)
- * Club domestic league appearances and goals

Marko Mugoša (Montenegrin: Марко Мугоша; born 4 April 1984) is a Montenegrin retired football midfielder.

== Club career ==
Born in Podgorica, he played with FK Budućnost Podgorica in the beginning of his career, and beside them he also represented FK Borac Čačak in the Serbian SuperLiga. 2010 he moved to Red Star. Same year he was loaned to FK Budućnost Podgorica. 2011 he was loaned to FK Jagodina and FK Novi Pazar. In 2015, he joined Swedish side Landskrona BoIS where he played 5 games.
