= Stevan Reljić =

Montenegrin footballer

Personal information
- Date of birth: 31 March 1986 (age 40)
- Place of birth: Pljevlja, SFR Yugoslavia
- Height: 1.83 m (6 ft 0 in)
- Position: Left back

Senior career*
Years	Team	Apps	(Gls)
2003–2005	Rudar Pljevlja	61	(5)
2005–2006	ČSK Čelarevo	7	(0)
2006	→ Tekstilac Odžaci (loan)	4	(0)
2006–2010	Rudar Pljevlja	97	(6)
2010–2013	Red Star Belgrade	21	(2)
2012	→ Borac Čačak (loan)	27	(0)
2013–2014	Vardar	32	(1)
2014	Concordia Chiajna	4	(0)
2014–2018	Rudar Pljevlja	90	(2)
- * Club domestic league appearances and goals as of 1 October 2020

Stevan Reljić (Cyrillic: Стеван Рељић, born 31 March 1986) is a Montenegrin retired footballer who last played for hometown club Rudar Pljevlja.

== Club career ==
He played for Concordia Chiajna, FK ČSK Čelarevo, FK Tekstilac Odžaci, FK Rudar Pljevlja, Red Star Belgrade and FK Borac Čačak.

== Career statistics ==
Club performance			League		Cup		Continental		Total	
Season	Club	League	Apps	Goals	Apps	Goals	Apps	Goals	Apps	Goals
Serbia			League		Serbian Cup		Europe		Total	
2009–10	Red Star	Serbian SuperLiga	4	0	0	0	0	0	4	0
2010–11	Red Star	Serbian SuperLiga	10	2	0	0	0	0	10	2
2011–12	Red Star	Serbian SuperLiga	7	0	2	0	1	0	10	0
2011–12	Borac Čačak (loan)	Serbian SuperLiga	27	0	3	0	0	0	30	0
2012–13	Red Star	Serbian SuperLiga	0	0	0	0	0	0	0	0
			League		Cup		Continental		Total	
Total	Serbia		48	2	5	0	1	0	54	2
Macedonia			League		Macedonian Cup		Europe		Total	
2013–14	Vardar	Macedonian First Football League	32	1	4	0	2	0	38	1
			League		Cup		Continental		Total	
Total	Macedonia		32	1	4	0	2	0	38	1
Career total			62	3	9	0	3	0	74	3
