= Milan Jeremić (footballer) =

Serbian footballer

Personal information
- Full name: Milan Jeremić
- Date of birth: 22 September 1988 (age 38)
- Place of birth: Belgrade, SFR Yugoslavia
- Height: 1.78 m (5 ft 10 in)
- Position: Winger

Youth career
- 2004–2005: Red Star Belgrade
- 2006–2008: Benfica

Senior career*
| Years | Team | Apps | (Gls) |
| 2005–2006 | Sinđelić Beograd | 7 | (0) |
| 2008–2010 | Zemun | 45 | (9) |
| 2010–2011 | Red Star Belgrade | 4 | (0) |
| 2012–2013 | Borac Čačak | 41 | (7) |
| 2014 | Kolubara | 9 | (1) |
| 2014–2017 | Sloboda Užice | 46 | (4) |
| 2017 | Dinamo Vranje | 7 | (0) |
| 2018 | Gorodeya | 1 | (0) |
| 2018 | Dinamo 1945 | | |
- * Club domestic league appearances and goals

Milan Jeremić (Serbian Cyrillic: Милан Јеремић; born 22 September 1988) is a Serbian retired footballer who played as a winger.

== Career ==
His career started in Serbia when Red Star Belgrade signed him after a successful trial at age of 16. However, after alerting attention from other European clubs, Red Star Belgrade sold the youngster to S.L. Benfica, where he has been one of their most prolific goal scorers for the junior squad, averaging over 1 goal in every 2 games. In December 2009, he signed a 3,5 year contract with Red Star Belgrade.
