= Miloš Reljić =

Serbian footballer

Personal information
- Full name: Miloš Reljić
- Date of birth: 12 June 1989 (age 37)
- Place of birth: Petrovac na Mlavi, SFR Yugoslavia
- Height: 1.76 m (5 ft 9 1/2 in)
- Position: Forward

Senior career*
Years	Team	Apps	(Gls)
2007–2011	Red Star Belgrade	2	(1)
2008–2009	→ Srem (loan)	20	(4)
2009	→ Sopot (loan)	2	(0)
2010–2011	→ BSK Borča (loan)	13	(0)
2011	Lokomotiv Plovdiv	7	(0)
2012–2013	Valsta Syrianska	23	(7)
2013–2014	Znojmo	21	(3)
2014	Sloga Petrovac	14	(2)
2015	Velež Mostar	25	(2)
2016	Sloga Petrovac	14	(5)
2016–2017	Kolubara	23	(4)
2017–2018	Ungheni		
2018–2019	Budućnost Dobanovci	9	(1)
2019	IMT		
2020-2022	Sloga 33		
2022-2023	Rudar 1947 Stamnica		
- * Club domestic league appearances and goals

Miloš Reljić (Serbian Cyrillic: Милош Рељић; born 12 June 1989) is a Serbian retired footballer.

== Club career ==
He played for the U-19 at Red Star Belgrade before moving out on loan to FK Srem. In 2009 Reljic returned to Red Star Belgrade.

In February 2018, Reljić left FC Ungheni and joined Budućnost Dobanovci. He left the club again in February 2019, before joining FK IMT in the summer 2019, which he left at the end of the year and then returned to Sloga Petrovac in January 2020.
