= Marko Jakšić (footballer, born 1987) =

Serbian footballer

Personal information
- Full name: Marko Jakšić
- Date of birth: 6 March 1987 (age 39)
- Place of birth: Karlovac, SFR Yugoslavia
- Height: 1.86 m (6 ft 1 in)
- Position: Centre-back

Senior career*
Years	Team	Apps	(Gls)
2005–2008	Mladost Apatin	15	(1)
2005	→ Big Bull Bačinci (loan)	1	(0)
2006	→ OFK Tavankut (loan)	1	(0)
2006–2008	→ Big Bull Bačinci (loan)	49	(2)
2009–2011	Inđija	71	(1)
2012–2014	Bežanija	41	(0)
2015	Jedinstvo Užice	14	(1)
2015	ČSK Čelarevo	5	(0)
2016	Radnički Šid		
- * Club domestic league appearances and goals as of 19 June 2016

Marko Jakšić (Serbian Cyrillic: Марко Јакшић; born 6 March 1987) is a Serbian retired football defender.
