= 2009–10 Serbian Cup =

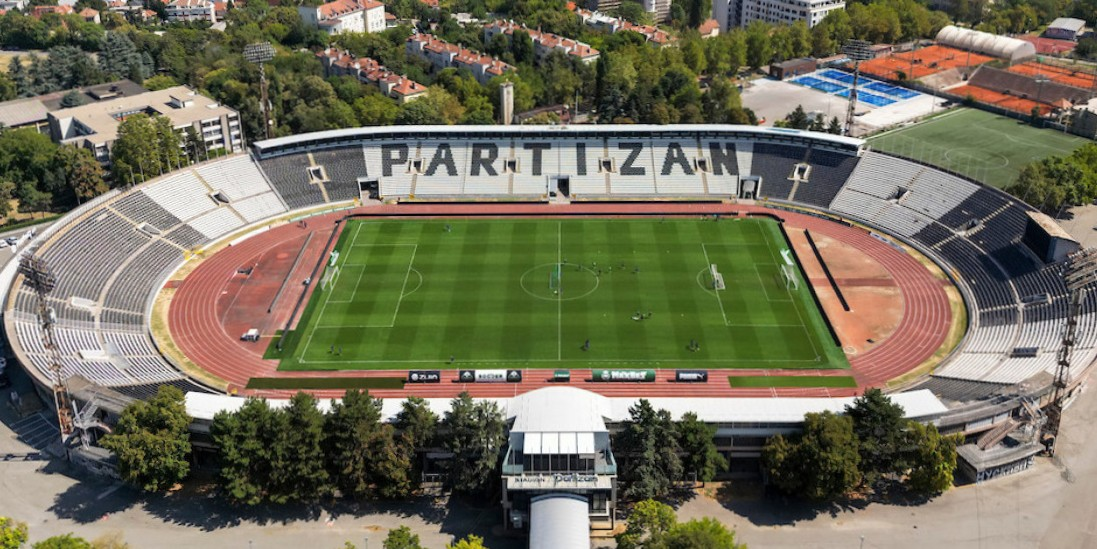
- Partizan Stadium hosted the final

Tournament details
- Country: Serbia

Final positions
- Champions: Red Star
- Runners-up: Vojvodina

Tournament statistics
- Matches played: 34
- Goals scored: 93 (2.74 per match)

The 2009–10 Serbian Cup season was the fourth season of the Serbian national football tournament. The competition started on 2 September 2009 and ended with the final on 5 May 2010. FK Partizan were the defending champions. Red Star Belgrade won the cup after a 3–0 win against Vojvodina.

== Preliminary round ==
A preliminary round was held in order to reduce the number of teams competing in the next round to 32 and featured six teams from Serbian lower divisions. The matches were played on 2 September 2009.

Team 1	Score	Team 2
Srem Jakovo (III)	1–1 (p. 1–4)	Proleter Novi Sad (II)
Radnički Svilajnac (III)	1–0	Hajduk Beograd (III)
Partizan Kosovska Mitrovica (IV)	3–1	Lokomotiva Lapovo (V)

Note: Roman numerals in brackets denote the league tier the clubs participate in during the 2009–10 season.

== Round of 32 ==
In this round entered three winners from the previous round as well as all 12 teams from Serbian SuperLiga from 2008–09 and all 18 teams from Serbian First League from 2008–09. The matches were played on 22–23 September 2009.

Team 1	Score	Team 2
OFK Beograd	1–1 (p. 5–4)	Novi Sad (II)
Čukarički	1–1 (p. 3–5)	Metalac
Partizan	3–0	Inđija (II)
Vojvodina	4–0	Dinamo Vranje (II)
Red Star	6–1	Mladost Apatin(II)
BSK Borča	1–1 (p. 4–5)	Sevojno (II)
Hajduk Kula	1–1 (p. 5–3)	ČSK (II)
Rad	2–3	Mladost Lučani (II)
Smederevo	4–0	Kolubara (II)
Spartak Zlatibor Voda	3–0	Bežanija (II)
Proleter Novi Sad (II)	3–1	Javor
Srem (II)	1–1 (p. 1–4)	Borac Čačak
Novi Pazar (II)	2–1	Mladi Radnik
Voždovac (III)	0–1	Jagodina
Partizan Kosovska Mitrovica (IV)	0–0 (p. 5–4)	Napredak
Radnički Svilajnac (III)	1–3	Banat Zrenjanin (II)

Note: Roman numerals in brackets denote the league tier the clubs participate in during the 2009–10 season.

== Round of 16 ==
The matches were played on 28 October 2009.

Team 1	Score	Team 2
Smederevo	3–0	Hajduk Kula
Metalac	0–1	Borac Čačak
Jagodina	1–0	Sevojno (II)
Novi Pazar (II)	0–1	Red Star
Proleter Novi Sad (II)	1–2	Partizan
Mladost Lučani (II)	1–3	Vojvodina
Banat Zrenjanin (II)	0–2	Spartak Zlatibor Voda
OFK Beograd	3–1	Partizan Kosovska Mitrovica (IV)

Note: Roman numerals in brackets denote the league tier the clubs participate in during the 2009–10 season.

== Quarter-finals ==
The matches were played on 25 November 2009.

Team 1	Score	Team 2
Jagodina	1–2	Partizan
Red Star	3–2	Spartak Zlatibor Voda
Vojvodina	1–0	Smederevo
Borac Čačak	0–2	OFK Beograd

== Semi-finals ==
14 April 2010

Red Star	1–0	OFK Beograd
Lekić 88'

Red Star Stadium
Attendance: 10,000
Referee: Slobodan Veselinović

15 April 2010

Partizan	1–3	Vojvodina
Petrović 45'		Mrđa 36' 49'; Đurovski 59'

Partizan Stadium
Attendance: 8,000
Referee: Milenko Vukadinović

== Final ==
5 May 2010

Red Star	3–0	Vojvodina
Jevtić 14', Cadú 62'; Trifunović 72'	Report

Partizan Stadium, Belgrade
Attendance: 23,000
Referee: Dragomir Stanković
