= 2011–12 Sloboda Point Sevojno season =

Sloboda Užice
2011–12 season
- Chairman: Dragan Subotić
- Manager: Ljubiša Stamenković
- Stadium: Užice City Stadium
- Serbian SuperLiga: 5th
- Serbian Cup: Last 16
- Top goalscorer: League: Savo Kovačević (12); All: Savo Kovačević (12)
- Highest home attendance: 11,000 vs Partizan (21 August 2011)
- Lowest home attendance: 500 vs Smederevo (4 April 2012)
- Average home league attendance: 3,567
Home colours	Away colours	Third colours

The 2011–12 season was Sloboda Point Sevojno's second consecutive season in the Serbian SuperLiga. It was the first season Sloboda played on the renovated Užice City Stadium. Sloboda kicked off the season away against Jagodina on 13 August. The first home game, in the renovated stadium, was against the champions Partizan on 21 August. The club had been playing under the name FK Sloboda Point Sevojno, until the name Sloboda Užice was restored as the club's name on 13 October 2011.

Because the club started the season with the name FK Sloboda Point Sevojno the name change wasn't effective until the end of the 2011–12 season.

Since Red Star won the Serbian Cup the 4th placed team would achieve Europa League spot. Sloboda gathered their form and eventually found themselves fighting for Europa League. At the end of round 29, the table was: Vojvodina in third place with 49 points, Jagodina in fourth place with 48 points, Sloboda Point in fifth place with 48 points, Radnički 1923 in sixth place with 47 points. In the last round Vojvodina faced Red Star at home, Jagodina faced Novi Pazar at home, Sloboda faced OFK Beograd away, and Radnički faced Rad away. Sloboda got the lead against OFK Beograd through Bojan Beljić in the 11th minute. At the 89th minute mark Sloboda was 4th, Vojvodina 5th. In the dying seconds of the match between Vojvodina and Red Star, Aboubakar Oumarou scored the winner for Vojvodina in a match which ended 2–1. That meant that Sloboda had the same number of points as 4th place Jagodina. However, because of a better head to head score (1-1 at Jagodina and 2–1 win for Jagodina in Užice), Jagodina achieved Europe.

== Transfers ==
=== In ===
Date	Pos.	Name	From	Fee
1 July 2011	DF	(Bosnia and Herzegovina) Jovan Vujanić	(Bosnia and Herzegovina) Modriča	Free
1 July 2011	FW	(Serbia) Marko Memedović	(Serbia) Sloga Kraljevo	Free
9 July 2011	MF	(Serbia) Nebojša Prtenjak	(Serbia) Borac Čačak	Free
9 July 2011	FW	(Montenegro) Filip Kasalica	(Montenegro) Hajduk Kula	Free
28 July 2011	DF	(Bosnia and Herzegovina) Slavko Marić	(Serbia) Borac Čačak	Free
8 August 2011	MF	(Serbia) Vojislav Vranjković	(Romania) Pandurii Târgu Jiu	Free
8 August 2011	DF	(Serbia) Aleksandar Gojković	(Serbia) Sloga Kraljevo	Free
14 August 2011	DF	(Liberia) Omega Roberts	(Mali) Cercle Bamako	Free
14 August 2011	DF	(Serbia) Jovica Vasilić	(Serbia) Sloga Kraljevo	Loan
31 August 2011	DF	(Serbia) Slavko Ćulibrk	(Serbia) Banat Zrenjanin	Free
31 August 2011	MF	(Serbia) Stojan Pilipović	(Serbia) Banat Zrenjanin	Free
1 September 2011	MF	(Montenegro) Vuk Đurić	(Serbia) Hajduk Kula	Free
27 January 2012	FW	(Serbia) Predrag Ranđelović	(Montenegro) Mogren	Free
28 January 2012	MF	(Serbia) Bojan Beljić	(Iran) Shahrdari Tabriz	Free
1 February 2012	DF	(Serbia) Mladen Lazarević	(Iran) Gostaresh Foolad	Free
6 February 2012	MF	(Serbia) Vladimir Krstić	(Serbia) BSK Borča	Free
1 March 2012	FW	(Cameroon) Didier Tayou	(Tunisia) Olympique du Kef	Free

=== Out ===
Date	Pos.	Name	To	Fee
30 June 2011	MF	(Serbia) Vladimir Vukajlović	(Greece) Diagoras Rodos	Free
30 June 2011	DF	(Serbia) Radoš Bulatović	(Hungary) Zalaegerszeg	Free
30 June 2011	FW	(Serbia) Predrag Lazić	(Cyprus) Aris Limassol	Free
30 June 2011	DF	(Slovakia) Maroš Klimpl	(Cyprus) Aris Limassol	Free
30 June 2011	DF	(Serbia) Dragan Radosavljević	(Cyprus) Aris Limassol	Free
30 June 2011	MF	(Serbia) Radan Šunjevarić	(Serbia) Novi Pazar	Free
30 June 2011	FW	(Serbia) Edin Ademović	(Serbia) Novi Pazar	Free
30 June 2011	FW	(Serbia) Vladimir Vujović	(Serbia) Jagodina	Free
1 July 2011	GK	(Serbia) Milorad Nikolić	(Serbia) Javor Ivanjica	Free
1 July 2011	MF	(Czech Republic) Tomáš Poláček	(Czech Republic) Chmel Blšany	Free
1 July 2011	DF	(Serbia) Aleksandar Petrović	(Serbia) Novi Pazar	Free
1 July 2011	FW	(Serbia) Marko Pavićević	(Cyprus) Ethnikos Achna	Free
1 July 2011	FW	(Serbia) Igor Stanisavljević	(Serbia) FK Beograd	Free
1 July 2011	MF	(Serbia) Dušan Mihailović	Released	Free
8 January 2012	DF	(Serbia) Nikola Maksimović	(Serbia) Red Star Belgrade	€330K
8 January 2012	FW	(Montenegro) Filip Kasalica	(Serbia) Red Star Belgrade	€220K
1 February 2012	MF	(Serbia) Njegoš Goločevac	(Serbia) Hajduk Kula	Free
1 February 2012	DF	(Serbia) Đuro Stevančević	(Serbia) Inđija	Free
8 February 2012	DF	(Serbia) Bogdan Planić	(Serbia) Bežanija	Free
9 February 2012	MF	(Montenegro) Vuk Đurić	(Serbia) Voždovac	Free
10 February 2012	DF	(Bosnia and Herzegovina) Jovan Vujanić	(Bosnia and Herzegovina) Slavija Sarajevo	Loan
10 February 2012	MF	(North Macedonia) Gjorgji Tanušev	(Serbia) BSK Borča	Free
17 February 2012	MF	(Serbia) Nebojša Prtenjak	(Kazakhstan) Taraz	Free

== Fixtures ==
Round

13 August 2011 1	Jagodina	1 - 1	Sloboda PS	Jagodina
17:30 CET	Đenić 45'		Kasalica 40'	Stadium: Stadion pod Đurđevim brdom Attendance: 1,000; Referee: Milenko Vukadinović

21 August 2011 2	Sloboda PS	2 - 1	Partizan	Užice
17:00 CET	Kasalica 37'; Marić 90+3'		Aksentijević 30'	Stadium: Begluk; Attendance: 11,000; Referee: Vlado Glođović

28 August 2011 3	Rad	1 - 2	Sloboda PS	Belgrade
17:00 CET	Mitrović 25'		Kasalica 22'; Galvão 50' (pen.)	Stadium: Banjice; Attendance: 1,000; Referee: Miodrag Gogić

10 September 2011 4	Sloboda PS	2 - 2	Vojvodina	Užice
16:30 CET	Prtenjak 36'; Kovačević 83'		Ilić 14' (pen.); Oumarou 43'	Stadium: Begluk; Attendance: 4,500; Referee: Danilo Grujić

17 September 2011 5	Spartak ZV	0 - 0	Sloboda PS	Subotica
16:30 CET				Stadium: Subotica City Stadium; Attendance: 2,000; Referee: Danilo Grujić

24 September 2011 6	Sloboda PS	1 - 0	Javor	Užice
16:00 CET	Kasalica 28'			Stadium: Begluk; Attendance: 2,500; Referee: Milan Karadžić

1 October 2011 7	Smederevo	1 - 2	Sloboda PS	Smederevo
15:30 CET	Ćeran 63'		Kasalica 21'; Galvão 36'	Stadium: Stadion FK Smederevo; Attendance: 1,000; Referee: Marko Popović

15 October 2011 8	Sloboda PS	0 - 1	BSK	Užice
14:30 CET			Milošević 22'	Stadium: Begluk; Attendance: 2,500; Referee: Milorad Mažić

22 October 2011 9	Borac Čačak	1 - 2	Sloboda PS	Čačak
14:30 CET	Alves 32'		Kovačević 3'; Galvão 21'	Stadium: Čačak Stadium; Attendance: 700; Referee: Danilo Mihajlović

30 October 2011 10	Sloboda PS	1 - 1	Red Star	Užice
14:00 CET	Kasalica 73'		Borja 87'	Stadium: Begluk; Attendance: 10,000; Referee: Danilo Grujić

6 November 2011 11	Radnički 1923	2 - 1	Sloboda PS	Kragujevac
13:00 CET	Spalević 14' (pen.), 25'		Kovačević 77'	Stadium: Čika Dača; Attendance: 8,000; Referee: Slobodan Veselinović

19 November 2011 12	Sloboda PS	4 - 1	Metalac	Užice
13:00 CET	Kovačević 34' (pen.); Galvão 43', 60'; Kasalica 67'		Svojić 24'	Stadium: Begluk; Attendance: 1,500; Referee: Darko Bogdanović

26 November 2011 13	Novi Pazar	4 - 0	Sloboda PS	Novi Pazar
13:00 CET	Vušljanin 29'; Hadžibulić 36'; Ademović 45'; Stojanović 80'			Stadium: Gradski stadion Attendance: closed to the public Referee: Dejan Dimitrijević

4 December 2011 14	Hajduk Kula	1 - 2	Sloboda PS	Kula
13:00 CET	Paunović 14'		Jovanović 87' (og.); Pauljević 90+3' (og.)	Stadium: Stadion Hajduk; Attendance: 1,000; Referee: Milan Karadžić

10 December 2011 15	Sloboda PS	1 - 2	OFK Beograd	Užice
13:00 CET	Prtenjak 73'		Popović 7', 25'	Stadium: Begluk; Attendance: 3,000; Referee: Dejan Santrač

3 March 2012 16	Sloboda PS	1 - 2	Jagodina	Užice
14:00 CET	Galvão 57'		Gogić 70'; Krstić 75'	Stadium: Begluk; Attendance: 3,000; Referee: Milenko Vukadinović

10 March 2012 17	Partizan	0 - 0	Sloboda PS	Belgrade
19:00 CET				Stadium: JNA; Attendance: 21,453; Referee: Vlado Glođović

14 March 2012 18	Sloboda PS	0 - 2	Rad	Užice
14:30 CET			Stanojević 47'; Perović 79'	Stadium: Begluk; Attendance: 2,500; Referee: Aleksandar Vasić

17 March 2012 19	Vojvodina	2 - 0	Sloboda PS	Novi Sad
17:00 CET	Mojsov 82'; Katai 87'			Stadium: Karađorđe; Attendance: 4,500; Referee: Ninoslav Spasić

24 March 2012 20	Sloboda PS	2 - 0	Spartak ZV	Užice
14:30 CET	Kovačević 53' (pen.), 85'			Stadium: Begluk; Attendance: 1,754; Referee: Danilo Grujić

31 March 2012 21	Javor	3 - 1	Sloboda PS	Ivanjica
15:00 CET	Odita 29'; Eliomar 41'; Vujadinović 80'		Kovačević 65'	Stadium: Stadion kraj Moravice; Attendance: 900; Referee: Vlado Glođović

4 April 2012 22	Sloboda PS	2 - 1	Smederevo	Užice
16:00 CET	Beljić 14' (pen.); Milović 67' (o.g.)		Milosavljević 9'	Stadium: Begluk; Attendance: 500; Referee: Milorad Mažić

8 April 2012 23	BSK	0 - 2	Sloboda PS	Belgrade
16:00 CET			Beljić 13'; Memedović 87'	Stadium: Vizelj Park; Attendance: 500; Referee: Danilo Mihajlović

14 April 2012 24	Sloboda PS	2 - 1	Borac	Užice
16:00 CET	Ranđelović 35', 41'		Jeremić 26'	Stadium: Begluk; Attendance: 4,000; Referee: Slobodan Veselinović

21 April 2012 25	Red Star	1 - 0	Sloboda PS	Belgrade
18:00 CET	Mikić 83'			Stadium: Marakana; Attendance: 11,120; Referee: Aleksandar Vasić

25 April 2012 26	Sloboda PS	2 - 2	Radnički 1923	Užice
16:30 CET	Kovačević 23'; Ranđelović 29'		Spalević 28' (pen.); Tintor 67'	Stadium: Begluk; Attendance: 6,000; Referee: Dejan Dimitrijević

29 April 2012 27	Metalac	0 - 1	Sloboda PS	Gornji Milanovac
16:30 CET			Kovačević 45' (pen.)	Stadium: Stadion Kraj Despotovice; Attendance: 400; Referee: Darko Bogdanović

5 May 2012 28	Sloboda PS	3 - 0	Novi Pazar	Užice
17:00 CET	Kovačević 15', 58'; Ranđelović 37'			Stadium: Begluk; Attendance: 3,850; Referee: Slobodan Veselinović

12 May 2012 29	Sloboda PS	4 - 2	Hajduk Kula	Užice
17:00 CET	Kovačević 34'; Beljić 40', 71'; Ranđelović 59'		Ćovin 3'; Zorica 75'	Stadium: Begluk; Attendance: 4,000; Referee: Svetislav Marušić

20 May 2012 30	OFK Beograd	0 - 1	Sloboda PS	Belgrade
15:00 CET			Beljić 11'	Stadium: Karaburma; Attendance: 1,000; Referee: Danilo Mihajlović

=== Results and positions by round ===
Round	1	2	3	4	5	6	7	8	9	10	11	12	13	14	15	16	17	18	19	20	21	22	23	24	25	26	27	28	29	30
Ground	A	H	A	H	A	H	A	H	A	H	A	H	A	A	H	H	A	H	A	H	A	H	A	H	A	H	A	H	H	A
Result	D	W	W	D	D	W	W	L	W	D	L	W	L	W	D	L	D	L	L	W	L	W	W	W	L	D	W	W	W	W
Position	10	6	3	7	7	7	3	3	3	3	4	4	5	5	5	5	6	7	7	7	7	6	6	6	6	6	6	6	5	5

Updated to match(es) played on 20 May 2012. Source: superliga.rs
A = Away; H = Home; W = Win; D = Draw; L = Loss

=== Serbian SuperLiga ===
Pos	Club	Pld	W	D	L	GF	GA	GD	Pts
4	Jagodina	30	14	9	7	34	20	+14	51
5	Sloboda Point Sevojno	30	15	6	9	42	35	+7	51
6	Radnički 1923	30	11	14	5	38	27	+11	47

Pld = Matches played; W = Matches won; D = Matches drawn; L = Matches lost; GF = Goals for; GA = Goals against; GD = Goal difference; Pts = Points

== Serbian Cup ==
Round

21 September 2011 1st Round	Sloboda PS	1 – 1 (4 – 2 p)	Teleoptik	Užice
15:30	Kasalica 14'		Jojić 66'	Stadium: Begluk; Attendance: 1,000; Referee: Dejan Santrač
	Penalties
	Kovačević (penalty scored); Thiago Galvão (penalty scored); Marić (penalty scored); Prtenjak (penalty scored)		(penalty scored) Ostojić; (penalty missed) Jojić; (penalty scored) Mitrović; (penalty missed) Crnoglavac

26 October 2011 Last 16	Sloboda PS	1 – 1 (2 – 4 p)	Smederevo	Užice
14:00	Goločevac 52'		Brašanac 58'	Stadium: Begluk; Attendance: 1,500; Referee: Dragan Krstić
	Penalties
	Kovačević (penalty scored); Thiago Galvão (penalty missed); Pejović (penalty scored); Vasilić (penalty missed)		(penalty scored) Brašanac; (penalty scored) St. Kovačević; (penalty missed) Trujić; (penalty scored) Ćeran; (penalty scored) D. Živković

== Squad statistics ==
No.	Name	League		Cup		Europe		Total		Discipline	
No.	Name	Apps	Goals	Apps	Goals	Apps	Goals	Apps	Goals	Yellow card	Red card
Goalkeepers
1	(Montenegro) Darko Božović	27	0	2	0	0	0	29	0	4	0
12	(Serbia) Bojan Šejić	3(1)	0	0	0	0	0	3(1)	0	1	0
Defenders
2	(Serbia) Jovica Vasilić	26	0	2	0	0	0	28	0	6	1
Left	(Serbia) Nikola Maksimović^{(C)}	12	0	1(1)	0	0	0	13(1)	0	1	0
4	(Serbia) Mladen Lazarević	6	0	0	0	0	0	6	0	0	0
5	(Bosnia and Herzegovina) Jovan Vujanić	0	0	0	0	0	0	0	0	0	0
7	(Bosnia and Herzegovina) Slavko Marić	26	1	2	0	0	0	28	1	6	0
Left	(Serbia) Đuro Stevančević	4(6)	0	0(1)	0	0	0	4(7)	0	3	0
15	(Serbia) Aleksandar Gojković	11(4)	0	2	0	0	0	13(4)	0	3	0
Left	(Serbia) Bogdan Planić	0	0	0	0	0	0	0	0	0	0
44	(Liberia) Omega Roberts	13(1)	0	1	0	0	0	14(1)	0	5	1
55	(Serbia) Slavko Ćulibrk	10(4)	0	1	0	0	0	11(4)	0	3	0
Midfielders
3	(Ghana) Francis Bossman	14(6)	0	2	0	0	0	16(6)	0	11	0
Left	(North Macedonia) Gjorgji Tanušev	0(4)	0	0	0	0	0	0(4)	0	8	0
8	(Serbia) Vojislav Vranjković	20	0	2	0	0	0	22	0	9	0
Left	(Serbia) Njegoš Goločevac	14	0	2	1	0	0	16	1	5	0
10	(Serbia) Bojan Beljić	15	5	0	0	0	0	15	5	4	0
13	(Serbia) Aleksandar Pejović	14(13)	0	0(1)	0	0	0	14(14)	0	8	0
16	(Serbia) Stojan Pilipović	19(4)	0	0(1)	0	0	0	19(5)	0	4	0
18	(Serbia) Vladimir Krstić	5(9)	0	0	0	0	0	5(9)	0	1	0
Left	(Serbia) Nebojša Prtenjak	13	2	2	0	0	0	15	2	4	0
Left	(Montenegro) Vuk Đurić	0	0	0	0	0	0	0	0	0	0
Forwards
Left	(Montenegro) Filip Kasalica	14	7	1	1	0	0	15	8	4	0
9	(Serbia) Predrag Ranđelović	13(1)	5	0	0	0	0	13(1)	5	3	0
11	(Serbia) Marko Memedović	7(14)	1	0(1)	0	0	0	7(15)	1	5	0
20	(Brazil) Thiago Galvão	29	6	2	0	0	0	31	6	4	0
23	(Serbia) Savo Kovačević	17(9)	12	1(1)	0	0	0	18(10)	12	6	0
31	(Cameroon) Didier Tayou	1(1)	0	0	0	0	0	1(1)	0	0	0
33	(Serbia) Lazar Jovanović	0(4)	0	0	0	0	0	0(4)	0	1	0
