= 2010–11 Sloboda Point Sevojno season =

Sloboda Užice
2010–11 season
- Chairman: Dragan Subotić
- Manager: Ljubiša Stamenković
- Stadium: Mladost Stadium (Lučani)
- Serbian SuperLiga: 6th
- Serbian Cup: Semi-finals
- Top goalscorer: League: Nemanja Arsenijević (7); All: Nemanja Arsenijević (10)
- Highest home attendance: 4,500 vs Red Star (17 October 2010)
- Lowest home attendance: 200 vs Čukarički (13 November 2010)
- Average home league attendance: 1,257
Home colours	Away colours	Third colours

The 2011–12 season was Sloboda Point Sevojno's first season in the Serbian SuperLiga, after Sevojno finished 2nd in the Serbian First League. In the summer of 2010 Sloboda Užice and FK Sevojno merged, forming the club Sloboda Point Sevojno. Because of the reconstruction of the Užice City Stadium, Sloboda played their first season in SuperLiga on Mladost Lučani Stadium.

== Transfers ==
=== In ===
Date	Pos.	Name	From	Fee
1 July 2011	DF	(Serbia) Đuro Stevančević	(Serbia) Novi Sad	Free
1 July 2010	FW	(Serbia) Predrag Lazić	(Romania) Pandurii Târgu Jiu	Free
5 July 2010	MF	(Serbia) Njegoš Goločevac	(Romania) Oţelul Galaţi	Free
5 July 2010	MF	(Ghana) Francis Jojo Bossman	(Ghana) New Edubiase United	Free
10 August 2010	MF	(North Macedonia) Gjorgi Tanušev	(North Macedonia) Belasica Strumica	Free
11 August 2010	GK	(Serbia) Bojan Šejić	(Bosnia and Herzegovina) Laktaši	Free
14 August 2010	MF	(Serbia) Vladimir Vukajlović	(Russia) Dynamo Bryansk	Free
20 August 2010	MF	(Serbia) Marko Ljubinković	(Romania) Vaslui	Free
31 August 2010	DF	(Serbia) Rade Novković	(Russia) Luch-Energiya	Free
9 January 2011	GK	(Montenegro) Darko Božović	(Serbia) Partizan	Free
14 January 2011	DF	(Serbia) Aleksandar Petrović	(Serbia) Rad	Free
1 February 2011	FW	(Serbia) Savo Kovačević	(Serbia) Proleter Novi Sad	Free
4 February 2011	DF	(Serbia) Bogdan Planić	(Serbia) Zlatibor Čajetina	Free
10 February 2011	DF	(Serbia) Jovica Vasilić	(Serbia) Sloga Kraljevo	Loan
12 February 2011	DF	(Slovakia) Maroš Klimpl	(Czech Republic) Viktoria Žižkov	Free
12 February 2011	DF	(Czech Republic) Tomáš Poláček	(Czech Republic) Mladá Boleslav	Free
15 February 2011	FW	(Brazil) Tiago Galvão	(Brazil) Paulista	Free
15 February 2011	MF	(Brazil) Ricardinho	(Brazil) Corinthians B	Free

=== Out ===
Date	Pos.	Name	To	Fee
30 June 2010	DF	(Serbia) Darko Matejić	(Serbia) Šumadija Jagnjilo	Loan return
30 June 2010	MF	(Serbia) Nebojša Gavrilović	(Serbia) Kovačevac	Loan return
30 June 2010	FW	(Serbia) Ivan Maksimović	(Serbia) Sloga Bajina Bašta	Loan return
1 July 2010	MF	(Serbia) Vladislav Virić	(Uzbekistan) Mash'al Mubarek	Free
1 July 2010	MF	(Serbia) Aleksandar Brđanin	(Uzbekistan) Mash'al Mubarek	Free
1 July 2010	DF	(Serbia) Savo Raković	(Hungary) Diósgyőri VTK	Free
1 July 2010	DF	(Serbia) Marko Kostić	(Serbia) Sinđelić Niš	Free
1 July 2010	MF	(Serbia) Marin Miok	Released	Free
1 July 2010	MF	(Serbia) Milan Antonijević	Released	Free
4 July 2010	FW	(Serbia) Dušan Janković	(Serbia) Sloga Bajina Bašta	Free
5 July 2010	FW	(Serbia) Damir Skorupan	Released	Free
5 July 2010	FW	(Serbia) Bojan Brajković	(Serbia) Kolubara Lazarevac	Free
5 July 2010	MF	(Serbia) Lazar Jovičić	Released	Free
5 July 2010	MF	(Serbia) Stefan Lijeskić	Released	Free
6 July 2010	DF	(Serbia) Vladimir Sandulović	Released	Free
6 July 2010	DF	(Serbia) Darko Matejić	(Serbia) OFK Mladenovac	Free
6 July 2010	DF	(Serbia) Nikola Stanojević	Released	Free
6 July 2010	GK	(Serbia) Darko Rogić	Released	Free
6 July 2010	DF	(Serbia) Strahinja Aritonović	(Serbia) Sopot	Free
1 January 2011	MF	(Bosnia and Herzegovina) Petar Jovanović	(Serbia) Vaslui	Loan return
1 January 2011	FW	(Serbia) Nemanja Arsenijević	(Greece) Asteras Tripolis	Free
1 January 2011	MF	(Serbia) Marko Ljubinković	(Cyprus) Anorthosis Famagusta	Free
1 January 2011	DF	(North Macedonia) Darko Micevski	(North Macedonia) Rabotnički Skopje	Free
1 January 2011	DF	(Serbia) Rade Novković	Released	Free
1 January 2011	GK	(Serbia) Aleksandar Marinković	(Serbia) Jedinstvo Putevi	Loan
1 January 2011	MF	(Serbia) Ivan Petrović	Released	Free

== Fixtures ==
Round

15 August 2010 1	Hajduk Kula	1 - 2	Sloboda PS	Kula
16:30 CET	Kasalica 14'		Arsenijević 24'; Pavićević 51' (pen.)	Stadium: Stadion Hajduk; Attendance: 300; Referee: Milan Karadžić

21 August 2010 2	Sloboda PS	1 - 0	OFK Beograd	Lučani
16:30 CET	Pavićević 60'			Stadium: Mladost Stadium (Lučani); Attendance: 1,500; Referee: Bojan Stojanović

28 August 2010 3	Rad	0 - 0	Sloboda PS	Belgrade
16:00 CET				Stadium: Banjice; Attendance: 1,000; Referee: Milorad Mažić

11 September 2010 4	Sloboda PS	0 - 0	Borac	Lučani
15:30 CET				Stadium: Mladost Stadium (Lučani); Attendance: 2,500; Referee: Majo Vujović

19 September 2010 5	Spartak ZV	2 - 2	Sloboda PS	Subotica
15:30 CET	Torbica 1'; Ubiparip 68'		Ademović 82'; Pavićević 88'	Stadium: Subotica City Stadium; Attendance: 500; Referee: Igor Paunović

26 September 2010 6	Sloboda PS	0 - 0	Vojvodina	Lučani
13:00 CET				Stadium: Mladost Stadium (Lučani); Attendance: 1,750; Referee: Danilo Mihajlović

2 October 2010 7	Smederevo	0 - 0	Sloboda PS	Smederevo
12:45 CET				Stadium: Stadion FK Smederevo; Attendance: 1,200; Referee: Dejan Filipović

17 October 2010 8	Sloboda PS	0 - 3	Red Star	Lučani
14:00 CET			Trifunović 44'; Sávio 50'; Kaluđerović 85'	Stadium: Mladost Stadium (Lučani); Attendance: 4,500; Referee: Danilo Grujić

23 October 2010 9	Jagodina	0 - 1	Sloboda PS	Jagodina
13:30 CET			Arsenijević 64'	Stadium: Stadion pod Đurđevim brdom Attendance: 500; Referee: Milorad Mažić

30 October 2010 10	Sloboda PS	2 - 1	BSK	Lučani
12:00 CET	Lazić 38'; Ademović 56'		Vukadinović 33'	Stadium: Mladost Stadium (Lučani); Attendance: 300; Referee: Robert Kiš Čepegi

6 November 2010 11	Javor	1 - 0	Sloboda PS	Ivanjica
12:00 CET	Rendulić 90'			Stadium: Stadion kraj Moravice; Attendance: 1,000; Referee: Milan Karadžić

13 November 2010 12	Sloboda PS	4 - 0	Čukarički	Lučani
12:00 CET	Arsenijević 43', 57', 75'; Ljubinković 45'			Stadium: Mladost Stadium (Lučani); Attendance: 300; Referee: Novica Anđelovski

20 November 2010 13	Metalac	3 - 2	Sloboda PS	Gornji Milanovac
12:00 CET	Betolngar 8', 60'; Simović 86'		Ljubinković 18'; Lazić 27'	Stadium: Stadion Kraj Despotovice; Attendance: 400; Referee: Vlado Glođović

27 November 2010 14	Inđija	1 - 3	Sloboda PS	Inđija
12:00 CET	Vučetić 86'		Arsenijević 11', 13'; Ljubinković 51'	Stadium: Inđija Stadium; Attendance: 600; Referee: Dragan Krstić

4 December 2010 15	Partizan	5 - 2	Sloboda PS	Belgrade
12:00 CET	Cléo 1', 6'; Petrović 51'; Iliev 72'		Stevančević 65'; Ademović 77'	Stadium: JNA; Attendance: 4,467; Referee: Dejan Santrač

5 March 2011 16	Sloboda PS	2 - 2	Hajduk Kula	Lučani
14:00 CET	Maksimović 66'; Lalić 68' (og.)		Đukić 21'; Pauljević 80'	Stadium: Mladost Stadium (Lučani); Attendance: 200; Referee: Miodrag Gogić

9 March 2011 17	OFK Beograd	1 - 0	Sloboda PS	Belgrade
14:00 CET	Trivunović 54'			Stadium: Karaburma; Attendance: 400; Referee: Majo Vujović

12 March 2011 18	Sloboda PS	0 - 0	Rad	Lučani
14:30 CET				Stadium: Mladost Stadium (Lučani); Attendance: 500; Referee: Danilo Grujić

19 March 2011 19	Borac Čačak	1 - 0	Sloboda PS	Čačak
14:30 CET	Damjanović 32'			Stadium: Čačak Stadium; Attendance: 1,500; Referee: Vlado Glođović

2 April 2011 20	Sloboda PS	0 - 1	Spartak ZV	Lučani
15:00 CET			Torbica 13' (pen.)	Stadium: Mladost Stadium (Lučani); Attendance: 200; Referee: Dragan Krstić

9 April 2011 21	Vojvodina	3 - 1	Sloboda PS	Novi Sad
15:30 CET	Lazetić 41'; Katai 55'; Trajković 58'		Šunjevarić 18'	Stadium: Karađorđe; Attendance: 2,500; Referee: Dejan Filipović

16 April 2011 22	Sloboda PS	2 - 1	Smederevo	Lučani
16:00 CET	Lukić 59' (og.); Ademović 80'		Ćeran 21'	Stadium: Mladost Stadium (Lučani); Attendance: 400; Referee: Igor Paunović

20 April 2011 23	Red Star	5 - 1	Sloboda PS	Belgrade
18:00 CET	Ćosić 29'; Lazović 55'; Kaluđerović 66'; Borja 79'; Evandro 90'		Lazić 35'	Stadium: Marakana; Attendance: 15,520; Referee: Aleksandar Vasić

23 April 2011 24	Sloboda PS	2 - 0	Jagodina	Lučani
16:30 CET	Lazić 70'; Bossman 88'			Stadium: Mladost Stadium (Lučani); Attendance: 200; Referee: Marko Popović

30 April 2011 25	BSK	0 - 1	Sloboda PS	Belgrade
17:00 CET			Vasilić 26'	Stadium: Vizelj Park; Attendance: 150; Referee: Robert Kiš Čepegi

7 May 2011 26	Sloboda PS	2 - 0	Javor	Lučani
17:00 CET	Lazić 26', 90'			Stadium: Mladost Stadium (Lučani); Attendance: 200; Referee: Svetislav Marušić

15 May 2011 27	Čukarički	1 - 2	Sloboda PS	Belgrade
17:00 CET	Morariju 50'		Ademović 1'; Pavićević 17'	Stadium: Stadion na Banovom Brdu; Attendance: 150; Referee: Igor Paunović

21 May 2011 28	Sloboda PS	0 - 1	Metalac	Lučani
13:00 CET			Adamović 2'	Stadium: Mladost Stadium (Lučani); Attendance: 200; Referee: Majo Vujović

25 May 2011 29	Sloboda PS	1 - 0	Inđija	Lučani
17:00 CET	Kovačević 73' (pen.)			Stadium: Mladost Stadium (Lučani); Attendance: 150; Referee: Dragan Krstić

29 May 2011 30	Sloboda PS	1 - 2	Partizan	Lučani
17:00 CET	Pejović 89'		Tagoe 19'; Miljković 53'	Stadium: Mladost Stadium (Lučani); Attendance: 3,000; Referee: Srđan Kaurin

=== Results and positions by round ===
Round	1	2	3	4	5	6	7	8	9	10	11	12	13	14	15	16	17	18	19	20	21	22	23	24	25	26	27	28	29	30
Ground	A	H	A	H	A	H	A	H	A	H	A	H	A	A	A	H	A	H	A	H	A	H	A	H	A	H	A	H	H	H
Result	W	W	D	D	D	D	D	L	W	W	L	W	L	W	L	D	L	D	L	L	L	W	L	W	W	W	W	L	W	L
Position	2	2	4	5	5	6	6	8	6	5	6	5	5	5	5	5	5	6	7	8	9	8	10	9	8	5	5	5	5	6

Updated to match(es) played on 29 May 2011. Source: superliga.rs
A = Away; H = Home; W = Win; D = Draw; L = Loss

=== Serbian SuperLiga ===
Pos	Club	Pld	W	D	L	GF	GA	GD	Pts
5	Spartak ZV	30	11	10	9	34	27	+7	43
6	Sloboda Point Sevojno	30	12	7	11	34	35	-1	43
7	OFK Beograd	30	12	6	12	27	26	+1	42

Pld = Matches played; W = Matches won; D = Matches drawn; L = Matches lost; GF = Goals for; GA = Goals against; GD = Goal difference; Pts = Points

== Serbian Cup ==
Round

22 September 2010 1st Round	Mladi Radnik	1 - 3	Sloboda PS	Požarevac
15:30 CET	Stojanović 35'		Arsenijević 1'; Goločevac 27'; Stevančević 39'	Stadium: Vašarište; Attendance: 500; Referee: Srđan Kaurin

27 October 2010 Last 16	Sloboda PS	2 - 1	Metalac	Lučani
13:30 CET	Arsenijević 33'; Ademović 46'		Otašević 55'	Stadium: Mladost Stadium (Lučani); Attendance: 500; Referee: Bojan Stojanović

10 November 2010 Quarter-Finals	Sloboda PS	3 - 2	Spartak ZV	Lučani
13:00 CET	Arsenijević 12'; Goločevac 43'; Šunjevarić 45'		Ubiparip 27'; Nošković 49'	Stadium: Mladost Stadium (Lučani); Attendance: 200; Referee: Milenko Vukadinović

16 March 2011 Semi-finals 1st leg	Sloboda PS	1 - 2	Vojvodina	Lučani
14:00 CET	Kovačević 20'		Oumarou 28'; Mojsov 77'	Stadium: Mladost Stadium (Lučani); Attendance: 1,000; Referee: Milenko Vukadinović

6 April 2011 Semi-finals 2nd leg	Vojvodina	1 - 0	Sloboda PS	Novi Sad
14:00 CET	Katai 7'			Stadium: Karađorđe; Attendance: 2,500; Referee: Danilo Mihajlović

== Squad statistics ==
No.	Name	League		Cup		Europe		Total		Discipline	
No.	Name	Apps	Goals	Apps	Goals	Apps	Goals	Apps	Goals	Yellow card	Red card
Goalkeepers
1	(Serbia) Marko Nikolić	16	0	3	0	0	0	19	0	0	0
12	(Serbia) Bojan Šejić	1	0	0	0	0	0	1	0	0	0
25	(Montenegro) Darko Božović	13	0	2	0	0	0	15	0	1	0
Defenders
2	(Serbia) Jovica Vasilić	10	1	1	0	0	0	11	1	2	0
4	(Serbia) Radoš Bulatović	26	0	4	0	0	0	30	0	10	1
5	(Serbia) Dragan Radosavljević	26	0	4	0	0	0	30	0	8	0
11	(Serbia) Igor Stanisavljević	15(1)	0	4	0	0	0	19(1)	0	4	0
14	(Serbia) Đuro Stevančević	11(8)	1	2	1	0	0	13(8)	2	2	0
Left	(Bosnia and Herzegovina) Petar Jovanović	10	0	1	0	0	0	11	0	5	1
31	(Serbia) Nikola Maksimović	18(2)	1	3	0	0	0	21(2)	0	5	0
Left	(Serbia) Rade Novković	2	0	0(1)	0	0	0	2(1)	0	1	0
44	(Slovakia) Maroš Klimpl	12	0	2	0	0	0	14	0	7	0
55	(Serbia) Aleksandar Petrović	1	0	0	0	0	0	1	0	0	0
Midfielders
3	(Ghana) Francis Bossman	15(3)	1	3	0	0	0	18(3)	0	7	0
6	(North Macedonia) Gjorgji Tanušev	1(6)	0	0(2)	0	0	0	1(8)	0	2	0
7	(Serbia) Radan Šunjevarić^{(C)}	29	1	5	1	0	0	34	2	5	0
8	(Serbia) Njegoš Goločevac	11(6)	0	3(1)	2	0	0	14(7)	2	0	0
Left	(Serbia) Vladimir Vukajlović	0(3)	0	1	0	0	0	1(3)	0	0	0
13	(Serbia) Aleksandar Pejović	1(11)	1	0(3)	0	0	0	1(14)	1	5	0
15	(Serbia) Dušan Mihajlović	6(4)	0	1(3)	0	0	0	7(7)	0	5	0
Left	(Serbia) Ivan Petrović	0(5)	0	0(2)	0	0	0	0(7)	0	1	0
Left	(Serbia) Marko Ljubinković	4	3	0	0	0	0	4	3	1	0
Left	(North Macedonia) Darko Micevski	0	0	0	0	0	0	0	0	0	0
33	(Czech Republic) Tomáš Poláček	5(5)	0	0(1)	0	0	0	5(6)	0	1	0
Forwards
9	(Serbia) Marko Pavićević	25	4	3	0	0	0	28	4	5	0
16	(Brazil) Tiago Galvão	1(10)	0	0	0	0	0	1(10)	0	0	0
18	(Serbia) Predrag Lazić	28	6	5	0	0	0	33	6	6	0
Left	(Serbia) Nemanja Arsenijević	15	7	3	3	0	0	18	10	3	0
19	(Brazil) Ricardinho	2(1)	0	0	0	0	0	2(1)	0	1	0
20	(Serbia) Savo Kovačević	4(7)	1	2	1	0	0	6(7)	2	1	0
22	(Serbia) Vladimir Vujović	4(3)	0	0(1)	0	0	0	4(4)	0	2	0
23	(Serbia) Edin Ademović	16(8)	5	3	1	0	0	19(8)	6	8	0
