= 2013–14 Sloboda Užice season =

Sloboda Užice
2013–14 season
- Chairman: Dragan Subotić
- Manager: Ljubiša Stamenković
- Stadium: Užice City Stadium
- Serbian SuperLiga: 16th (relegated)
- Serbian Cup: Quarter-finals
- Top goalscorer: League: Tiago Galvão (7); All: Tiago Galvão (10)
- Highest home attendance: 10,202 vs Partizan (14 September 2013)
- Lowest home attendance: 1,000 vs Donji Srem (30 November 2013)
- Average home league attendance: 3,187
Home colours	Away colours	Third colours

The 2013–14 season was Sloboda Užice's 4th consecutive season in the Serbian SuperLiga. Pre-season started on 9 July 2013. Sloboda kicked off the season at home against Spartak ZV on 10 August.First away game was against newly promoted Čukarički on 18 August.The stadium was upgraded with floodlights, for the first time in history of the club, from 1 September. Sloboda was relegated on 28 May after a 1–0 home loss to Voždovac.

== Transfers ==
=== In ===
Date	Pos.	Name	From	Fee
9 July 2013	DF	(Serbia) Bogdan Miličić	(Serbia) Borac Čačak	Free
20 July 2013	MF	(Japan) Keisuke Ogawa	(Latvia) Jūrmala	Free
20 July 2013	MF	(Japan) Shohei Okuno	(Latvia) Auda	Free
26 July 2013	FW	(Serbia) Miloš Živanović	(Serbia) BSK Borča	Free
30 July 2013	FW	(Serbia) Dino Dolmagić	(Serbia) Zemun	Free
3 August 2013	MF	(Serbia) Miloš Žeravica	(Serbia) Napredak	Free
31 August 2013	MF	(Serbia) Dejan Babić	(Serbia) Partizan	Loan
9 September 2013	FW	(Azerbaijan) Murad Hüseynov	(Azerbaijan) Sumgayit	Free
25 January 2014	DF	(Serbia) Savo Raković	(Hungary) Egri	Free
25 January 2014	DF	(Bosnia and Herzegovina) Borislav Terzić	(Georgia (country)) Zestafoni	Free
25 January 2014	MF	(Serbia) Aleksandar Ćovin	(Belarus) Slavia-Mozyr	Free
27 January 2014	MF	(France) Sacha Petshi	(France) Troyes	Free
15 February 2014	FW	(Serbia) Stefan Mihajlović	(Serbia) Red Star	Loan
17 February 2014	MF	(Serbia) Novica Maksimović	(Hungary) Lombard-Pápa	Free
18 February 2014	MF	(Bosnia and Herzegovina) Nemanja Lekanić	(Serbia) Sloga Kraljevo	Free
20 February 2014	FW	(Nigeria) Kevin Amuneke	(Portugal) Tondela	Free

=== Out ===
Date	Pos.	Name	To	Fee
1 July 2013	FW	(Nigeria) Daniel Olerum	(Jordan) Al-Wehdat	Free
1 July 2013	FW	(Cameroon) Didier Tayou	(Malta) Mqabba	Free
1 July 2013	FW	(Serbia) Predrag Ranđelović	(Serbia) Kolubara	Free
1 July 2013	MF	(Serbia) Miloš Janićijević	(Serbia) Sloga Kraljevo	Free
1 July 2013	DF	(Serbia) Mladen Lazarević	(Serbia) Radnički Niš	Free
30 July 2013	MF	(Tajikistan) Nuriddin Davronov	(Tajikistan) Istiqlol Dushanbe	Free
30 July 2013	MF	(Guinea) Kalla Toure	Released	Free
15 August 2013	FW	(Serbia) Marko Memedović	(Serbia) Metalac	Undisclosed fee
1 September 2013	FW	(Serbia) Miloš Živanović	(Serbia) Jedinstvo Putevi	Free
23 September 2013	DF	(Bosnia and Herzegovina) Delimir Bajić	Released	Free
4 November 2013	FW	(Azerbaijan) Murad Hüseynov	Released	Free
31 December 2013	MF	(Bosnia and Herzegovina) Dario Purić	(Bosnia and Herzegovina) FK Sarajevo	Free
31 December 2013	MF	(Serbia) Vladimir Krstić	Released	Free
31 December 2013	MF	(Japan) Keisuke Ogawa	Released	Free
1 January 2014	MF	(Serbia) Stojan Pilipović	(Serbia) OFK Beograd	Free
1 January 2014	MF	(Serbia) Dejan Babić	(Serbia) Partizan	Loan Return
18 February 2014	DF	(Serbia) Jovica Vasilić	(Serbia) OFK Beograd	Undisclosed Fee

== Friendlies ==
15 July 2013	Sloboda Užice (Serbia)	1 - 1	Čelik Zenica (Bosnia and Herzegovina)	Zlatibor
17:00 CET	Ogawa		Dedić	Stadium: Švajcarija; Attendance: N/A; Referee: N/A

17 July 2013	Sloboda Užice (Serbia)	0 - 2	OFK Beograd (Serbia)	Tara
18:00 CET			Radivojević 7'; Adžić 26'	Stadium: Tara training ground Attendance: 300; Referee: N/A

23 July 2013	Sloboda Užice (Serbia)	5 - 2	Napredak (Serbia)	Zlatibor
19:30 CET	Pilipović; Krstić; Purić; Bajić; Djerić		N'Diaye; Deletić	Stadium: Švajcarija; Attendance: N/A; Referee: N/A

25 July 2013	Sloboda Užice (Serbia)	0 - 3	Metalac (Serbia)	Zlatibor
16:45 CET				Stadium: Stadion Kraj Jezera; Attendance: N/A; Referee: N/A

27 July 2013	Sloboda Užice (Serbia)	1 - 1	Mogren (Montenegro)	Zlatibor
20:00 CET	Krstić 40'		Đurović 68'	Stadium: Švajcarija; Attendance: N/A; Referee: N/A

31 July 2013	Javor (Serbia)	1 - 2	Sloboda Užice (Serbia)	Ivanjica
17:30 CET	Dražič		Gojković; Jovanović	Stadium: Stadion Kraj Moravice; Attendance: N/A; Referee: N/A

1 August 2013	Sloboda Užice (Serbia)	2 - 0	Mladenovac (Serbia)	Zlatibor
18:00 CET	Krstić 27'; Dolmagić 64'			Stadium: Stadium Selters; Attendance: N/A; Referee: N/A

3 August 2013	Sloboda Užice (Serbia)	1 - 0	Budućnost (Montenegro)	Užice
18:00 CET	Vasilić 44'			Stadium: Užice City Stadium; Attendance: N/A; Referee: N/A

2 February 2014	Čukarički (Serbia)	0 - 1	Sloboda Užice (Serbia)	Limassol
15:00 CET		Report	Ćovin 40'	Stadium: Training ground Attendance: N/A; Referee: N/A

5 February 2014	Mordovia Saransk (Russia)	1 - 2	Sloboda Užice (Serbia)	Limassol
15:00 CET		Report	Petshi 9'; Pejović 41'	Stadium: Training ground Attendance: N/A; Referee: N/A

7 February 2014	Rostov (Russia)	0 - 1	Sloboda Užice (Serbia)	Limassol
15:00 CET		Report	Ćovin 41'	Stadium: Training ground Attendance: N/A; Referee: N/A

8 February 2014	Kalmar FF (Sweden)	3 - 0	Sloboda Užice (Serbia)	Limassol
15:00 CET		Report		Stadium: Training ground Attendance: N/A; Referee: N/A

10 February 2014	Changchun Yatai (China)	2 - 2	Sloboda Užice (Serbia)	Limassol
15:00 CET		Report	Galvão; Ćovin	Stadium: Training ground Attendance: N/A; Referee: N/A

12 February 2014	Botev Plovdiv (Bulgaria)	5 - 1	Sloboda Užice (Serbia)	Limassol
15:00 CET		Report	Jovanović 71'	Stadium: Training ground Attendance: N/A; Referee: N/A

13 February 2014	Ural Sverdlovsk Oblast (Russia)	2 - 1	Sloboda Užice (Serbia)	Limassol
15:00 CET		Report	Maksimović	Stadium: Training ground Attendance: N/A; Referee: N/A

14 February 2014	Dynamo Kyiv (II) (Ukraine)	0 - 1	Sloboda Užice (Serbia)	Limassol
15:00 CET		Report	Lekanić	Stadium: Training ground Attendance: N/A; Referee: N/A

== Fixtures ==
Round

10 August 2013 1	Sloboda Užice	1 - 1	Spartak ZV	Užice
17:30 CET	Pejović 52'	Report	Torbica 55'	Stadium: Gradski Stadion u Užicu; Attendance: 2,500; Referee: Danilo Grujić

18 August 2013 2	Čukarički	1 - 0	Sloboda Užice	Belgrade
19:00 CET	Matić 31'	Report		Stadium: Stadion na Banovom Brdu; Attendance: 3,500; Referee: Dejan Santrač

24 August 2013 3	Sloboda Užice	0 - 0	Novi Pazar	Užice
17:00 CET		Report		Stadium: Gradski Stadion u Užicu; Attendance: 3,500; Referee: Dejan Dimitrijeć

31 August 2013 4	Radnički Niš	2 - 0	Sloboda Užice	Niš
19:00 CET	Jovanović 76'; Bulatović 79'	Report		Stadium: Čair; Attendance: 7,000; Referee: Marko Popović

14 September 2013 5	Sloboda Užice	1 - 2	Partizan	Užice
20:00 CET	Pilipović 83'	Report	Živković 48'; Kojić 82'	Stadium: Gradski Stadion u Užicu; Attendance: 10,202; Referee: Milorad Mažić

21 September 2013 6	Rad	0 - 0	Sloboda Užice	Belgrade
16:30 CET		Report		Stadium: Banjice; Attendance: 1,500; Referee: Vlado Glođović

29 September 2013 7	Sloboda Užice	2 - 1	Radnički 1923	Užice
19:00 CET	Žeravica 8'; Okuno 76'	Report	Kovačević 66'	Stadium: Gradski Stadion u Užicu; Attendance: 4,000; Referee: Slobodan Veselinović

5 October 2013 8	Sloboda Užice	2 - 2	OFK Beograd	Užice
15:30 CET	Galvão 11'; Babić 45'	Report	Damjanović 8', 86'	Stadium: Gradski Stadion u Užicu; Attendance: 2,500; Referee: Ninoslav Spasić

19 October 2013 9	Vojvodina	1 - 2	Sloboda Užice	Novi Sad
16:00 CET	Kaluđerović 25'	Report	Žeravica 33'; Jovanović 77'	Stadium: Karađorđe; Attendance: 2,000; Referee: Milenko Vukadinović

26 October 2013 10	Sloboda Užice	0 - 1	Javor	Užice
13:30 CET		Report	Sotirović 61'	Stadium: Gradski Stadion u Užicu; Attendance: 4,000; Referee: Darko Bogdanović

3 November 2013 11	Jagodina	2 - 0	Sloboda Užice	Jagodina
19:00 CET	Cvetković 56'; Lepović 67' (pen.)	Report		Stadium: Stadion pod Đurđevim brdom Attendance: 1,500; Referee: Dejan Dimitrijević

9 November 2013 12	Sloboda Užice	2 - 1	Napredak	Užice
17:00 CET	Galvão 26'; Purić 80'	Report	Knežević 20' (og.)	Stadium: Gradski Stadion u Užicu; Attendance: 3,500; Referee: Dejan Filipović

23 November 2013 13	Red Star	4 - 1	Sloboda Užice	Belgrade
17:00 CET	Gogić 12'; Mrđa 40', 42', 62'	Report	Galvão 10'	Stadium: Marakana; Attendance: closed to the public Referee: Danilo Grujić

30 November 2013 14	Sloboda Užice	0 - 1	Donji Srem	Užice
16:30 CET		Report	Zec 63'	Stadium: Gradski Stadion u Užicu; Attendance: 1,000; Referee: Marko Popović

7 December 2013 15	Voždovac	0 - 2	Sloboda Užice	Voždovac
13:00 CET		Report	Pejović 9'; Galvão 73'	Stadium: Stadium Voždovac; Referee: Danilo Mihajlović

26 February 2014 16	Spartak ZV	0 - 1	Sloboda Užice	Subotica
13:30 CET		Report	Žeravica 90'	Stadium: Subotica City Stadium; Referee: Dejan Filipović

2 March 2014 17	Sloboda Užice	1 - 2	Čukarički	Užice
14:30 CET	Ćovin 25'	Report	Matić 13'; Stojiljković 28'	Stadium: Gradski Stadion u Užicu; Attendance: 2,000; Referee: Srđan Obradović

8 March 2014 18	Novi Pazar	2 - 1	Sloboda Užice	Novi Pazar
14:00 CET	Sotirović 60'; Selimović 73'	Report	Mihajlović 66'	Stadium: Gradski stadion Attendance: 4,000; Referee: Slobodan Veselinović

15 March 2014 19	Sloboda Užice	0 - 0	Radnički Niš	Užice
14:30 CET		Report		Stadium: Gradski Stadion u Užicu; Attendance: 4,500; Referee: Aleksandar Vasić

22 March 2014 20	Partizan	1 - 0	Sloboda Užice	Belgrade
17:00 CET	Ilić 83'	Report		Stadium: JNA; Attendance: 12,500; Referee: Dejan Dimitrijević

29 March 2014 21	Sloboda Užice	1 - 0	Rad	Užice
17:00 CET	Galvão 65'	Report		Stadium: Gradski Stadion u Užicu; Attendance: 4,000; Referee: Danilo Grujić

5 April 2014 22	Radnički 1923	1 - 1	Sloboda Užice	Kragujevac
15:30 CET	Spalević 73'		Galvão 49'	Stadium: Čika Dača; Attendance: 700; Referee: Milenko Vukadinović

13 April 2014 23	OFK Beograd	1 - 0	Sloboda Užice	Belgrade
16:00 CET	Jovanović 45'	Report		Stadium: Karaburma; Attendance: 900; Referee: Dejan Santrač?

17 April 2014 24	Sloboda Užice	1 - 2	Vojvodina	Užice
18:30 CET	Galvão 33'	Report	Alivodić 37'; Stojanović 75'	Stadium: Gradski Stadion u Užicu; Attendance: 2,000; Referee: Milenko Vukadinović

22 April 2014 25	Javor	0 - 1	Sloboda Užice	Ivanjica
16:00 CET		Report	Jovanović 86'	Stadium: Stadion kraj Moravice; Attendance: 1,000; Referee: Dejan Dimitrijević

26 April 2014 26	Sloboda Užice	0 - 4	Jagodina	Užice
16:00 CET		Report	Pešić 18', 76', 79'; Šušnjar 88'	Stadium: Gradski Stadion u Užicu; Attendance: 3,500; Referee: Aleksandar Vasić

4 May 2014 27	Napredak	3 - 1	Sloboda Užice	Kruševac
19:00 CET	Vidaković 16'; Dimitrov 36'; Božović 88'	Report	Mihajlović 54'	Stadium: Stadion Mladosti; Attendance: 2,500; Referee: Novica Anđelovski

10 May 2014 28	Sloboda Užice	0 - 2	Red Star	Užice
17:00 CET		Report	Milijaš 3'; Pečnik 39'	Stadium: Gradski Stadion u Užicu; Attendance: 10,000; Referee: Danilo Grujić

25 May 2014 29	Donji Srem	0 - 0	Sloboda Užice	Pećinci
17:00 CET				Stadium: Sport Center Suvača; Attendance: 400; Referee: Dejan Filipović

28 May 2014 30	Sloboda Užice	0 - 1	Voždovac	Užice
17:00 CET		Report	Obradović 22'	Stadium: Gradski Stadion u Užicu; Attendance: 3,000; Referee: Vlado Glođović

=== Results and positions by round ===
Round	1	2	3	4	5	6	7	8	9	10	11	12	13	14	15	16	17	18	19	20	21	22	23	24	25	26	27	28	29	30
Ground	H	A	H	A	H	A	H	H	A	H	A	H	A	H	A	A	H	A	H	A	H	A	A	H	A	H	A	H	A	H
Result	D	L	D	L	L	D	W	D	W	L	L	W	L	L	W	W	L	L	D	L	W	D	L	L	W	L	L	L	D	L
Position	8	13	14	14	16	15	14	13	10	13	14	13	14	15	13	11	11	11	11	12	11	11	11	11	11	12	13	14	14	16

Updated to match(es) played on 28 May 2014. Source: superliga.rs
A = Away; H = Home; W = Win; D = Draw; L = Loss

=== Serbian SuperLiga ===
Pos	Club	Pld	W	D	L	GF	GA	GD	Pts
14	Rad	30	8	5	17	19	37	-18	29
15	Javor	30	6	11	13	29	38	-9	29
16	Sloboda Užice	30	7	7	16	21	38	-17	28

Pld = Matches played; W = Matches won; D = Matches drawn; L = Matches lost; GF = Goals for; GA = Goals against; GD = Goal difference; Pts = Points

== Serbian Cup ==
Round

25 September 2013 1st Round	Teleoptik	0 - 3	Sloboda Užice	Belgrade
16:00 CET		Report	Galvão 19', 45+2', 64'	Stadium: SC Partizan-Teleoptik; Attendance: 100; Referee: Dejan Santrač

30 October 2013 Last 16	Sloboda Užice	2 - 0	Voždovac	Užice
18:00 CET	Žeravica 71'; Pejović 77'	Report		Stadium: Begluk; Attendance: 2,500; Referee: Dejan Santrač

4 December 2013 Quarter-finals	Sloboda Užice	0 - 2	OFK Beograd	Užice
13:00 CET		Report	Ješić 27'; Čavrić 83'	Stadium: Begluk; Attendance: 1,000; Referee: Vlado Glođović

== Squad statistics ==
No.	Name	League		Cup		Total		Discipline	
No.	Name	Apps	Goals	Apps	Goals	Apps	Goals	Yellow card	Red card
Goalkeepers
1	(Serbia) Nikola Tasić	0	0	0	0	0	0	0	0
12	(Serbia) Dejan Ranković	30	0	3	0	33	0	1	0
Defenders
6	(Serbia) Nemanja Cvetković	1(1)	0	0(2)	0	1(3)	0	0	0
15	(Serbia) Aleksandar Gojković	28	0	3	0	31	0	3	0
23	(Serbia) Bogdan Miličić	3(3)	0	0(1)	0	3(4)	0	2	0
31	(Serbia) Darko Lovrić	25	0	3	0	28	0	7	1
44	(Bosnia and Herzegovina) Borislav Terzić	15	0	0	0	15	0	3	0
55	(Serbia) Savo Raković	12	0	0	0	12	0	3	1
Midfielders
3	(Serbia) Aleksa Vidić	0	0	0	0	0	0	0	0
4	(France) Sacha Petshi	7(2)	0	0	0	7(2)	0	4	0
5	(Serbia) Zoran Knežević	22	0	2	0	24	0	4	0
7	(Serbia) Aleksandar Pejović	24	2	3	1	27	3	4	0
13	(Serbia) Dino Dolmagić	0(10)	0	0(1)	0	0(11)	0	1	0
14	(Japan) Shohei Okuno	28(1)	1	3	0	31(1)	1	0	0
16	(Serbia) Miloš Žeravica	20(3)	3	1(1)	1	21(4)	4	6	0
18	(Bosnia and Herzegovina) Nemanja Lekanić	0	0	0	0	0	0	0	0
21	(Serbia) Aleksandar Ćovin	8(4)	1	0	0	8(4)	1	5	0
22	(Serbia) Novica Maksimović	13	0	0	0	13	0	4	0
Forwards
9	(Serbia) Stefan Mihajlović	8(5)	2	0	0	8(5)	2	4	0
10	(Nigeria) Kevin Amuneke	0(3)	0	0	0	0(3)	0	0	0
20	(Brazil) Tiago Galvão	29	7	3	3	32	10	6	0
33	(Serbia) Lazar Jovanović	6(16)	2	0(2)	0	6(18)	2	5	0
Players who left during the season
2	(Serbia) Jovica Vasilić^{(C)}	14	0	2	0	16	0	5	1
55	(Bosnia and Herzegovina) Delimir Bajić	5	0	0	0	5	0	1	0
8	(Bosnia and Herzegovina) Dario Purić	6(8)	1	2(1)	0	8(9)	1	1	0
10	(Serbia) Stojan Pilipović	15	1	3	0	18	1	5	0
11	(Serbia) Dejan Babić	9	1	3	0	12	1	1	0
17	(Japan) Keisuke Ogawa	0	0	0	0	0	0	0	0
18	(Serbia) Vladimir Krstić	2(10)	0	2	0	4(10)	0	0	0
22	(Serbia) Mirko Petrović	0	0	0	0	0	0	0	0
9	(Serbia) Miloš Živanović	0(2)	0	0	0	0(2)	0	0	0
9	(Azerbaijan) Murad Hüseynov	0	0	0	0	0	0	0	0
