= Nemanja Cvetković (footballer, born 1996) =

Serbian footballer

Personal information
- Date of birth: 3 January 1996 (age 30)
- Place of birth: Užice, FR Yugoslavia
- Height: 1.88 m (6 ft 2 in)
- Position: Centre-back

Team information
- Current team: Loznica
- Number: 25

Youth career
- Sloboda Užice

Senior career*
Years	Team	Apps	(Gls)
2013–2014	Sloboda Užice	3	(0)
2014–2017	Čukarički	0	(0)
2017	→ BASK (loan)		
2017–2018	Jedinstvo Užice		
2018–2021	Kolubara	50	(5)
2021–2022	Voždovac	4	(0)
2022	Leotar	10	(0)
2023-2024	Radnički SM		
2024-	Loznica		
- * Club domestic league appearances and goals as of 11 April 2023

Nemanja Cvetković (Serbian Cyrillic: Немања Цветковић; born 3 January 1996) is a Serbian footballer who plays as a defender.

== Club career ==
=== Sloboda Užice ===
He made his professional debut for Sloboda on 27 April 2013, in Serbian SuperLiga match versus FK Rad, at the age of 16. He played the last 5 minutes of that match. On 4 February 2014, during a training session Cvetković broke both his Tibia and Fibula after a challenge with Dino Dolmagić. Coach Ljubiša Stamenković said that he would miss the rest of the season.

=== Voždovac ===
On 2 July 2021, he signed a three-year contract with Voždovac.

== Career statistics ==
As of 7 December 2013

Club	Season	League		Cup		Continental		Total	
Club	Season	Apps	Goals	Apps	Goals	Apps	Goals	Apps	Goals
Sloboda Užice	2012–13	1	0	0	0	0	0	1	0
Sloboda Užice	2013–14	2	0	2	0	0	0	4	0
Sloboda Užice	Total	3	0	2	0	0	0	5	0
