= Antonijević =

Antonijević, sometimes spelled Antonijevic, is a surname. Notable people with the surname include:

- Atanasije Antonijević (1734–1804), Serbian archpriest
- Živana Antonijević (died 1828), Serbian bard
- Vojislav Antonijević (1874–1946), Serbian and Yugoslav diplomat and journalist
- Jovan Antonijević (1882–1952), Serbian actor
- Gavrilo Antonijević (1899–1999), Serbian centenarian monk
- Dušan Antonijević (1912–1986), Serbian actor
- Mislav Antonijević Drimkolski (1913–2001), Serbian teacher and education inspector
- Milivoje Antonijević (1920–2004), Yugoslav Partisan
- Dušanka Antonijević (1924–1984), Serbian actress
- Spasoje Antonijević (1927–1981), Serbian actor
- Zoran Antonijević (1945–2008), Serbian footballer
- Ingrid Antonijevic (born 1952), Chilean economist
- Predrag Antonijević (born 1959), Serbian film director and screenwriter
- Radovan Antonijević (born 1964), Serbian pedagogue and professor
- Jelena Antonijević (born 1965), Serbian actress
- Radoš Antonijević (born 1969), Serbian sculptor
- Nenad Antonijević (born 1969), Serbian historian
- Milan Antonijević (born 1975), Serbian lawyer
- Ana Antonijević (born 1987), Serbian volleyball player
- Stefan Antonijevic (born 1989), Serbian footballer
- Veljko Antonijević (born 1992), Serbian footballer
- Filip Antonijević (born 2000), Serbian footballer
