= Ivan Petrović (footballer, born 1986) =

Serbian footballer

Personal information
- Full name: Ivan Petrović
- Date of birth: 17 July 1986 (age 40)
- Place of birth: Užice, SFR Yugoslavia
- Height: 1.85 m (6 ft 1 in)
- Position: Central midfielder

Team information
- Current team: Višesava
- Number: 10

Senior career*
| Years | Team | Apps | (Gls) |
| 2003–2009 | Sloboda Užice | 108 | (19) |
| 2009 | Budućnost Podgorica | 4 | (0) |
| 2009–2011 | Sloboda Užice | 25 | (11) |
| 2011–2012 | Metalac Gornji Milanovac | 8 | (0) |
| 2012–2013 | CSMS Iași | 19 | (2) |
| 2013–2014 | Sopot | 11 | (4) |
| 2014 | Jedinstvo Užice | 2 | (0) |
| 2014 | Sloboda Užice | 4 | (0) |
| 2014–2017 | Sevojno | | |
| 2017–2018 | Jedinstvo Užice | 14 | (2) |
| 2018–2019 | Drina Ljubovija | | |
| 2019 | Sloboda Užice | 13 | (1) |
| 2019–2023 | Jedinstvo Užice | 80 | (38) |
| 2023- | Višesava | 20 | (11) |
- * Club domestic league appearances and goals as of 25 October 2014

Ivan Petrović (Serbian Cyrillic: Иван Петровић; born 17 July 1986) is a Serbian football midfielder who currently plays for amateur club Višesava.

== Career ==
Born in Užice, he made his first football steps in the local club FK Sloboda Užice. In 2003, he transferred from the youth team to the first team of Sloboda. He played for Sloboda until 2009 when he transferred to FK Budućnost Podgorica. Until that transfer, Petrović recorded 108 matches and scored 19 goals for Sloboda.

After a short time spent in Montenegro, he returned to Sloboda. This time he spent 2 years at his home club and played a total of 25 matches and scored 11 goals. The following season, he moved to FK Metalac Gornji Milanovac, and after that, he moved to CSMS Iași.

After returning to Serbia in 2013, he played for FK Sopot for 2 years, for the first time for Jedinstvo Užice, for the third time for Sloboda and then moved to FK Sevojno. In 2017, he returned to Jedinstvo for the second time, but the following season he moved to FK Drina Ljubovija.

Shortly afterward, in 2019, Petrović returned for the fourth time to the reconstructed team of Sloboda, which then competed in the Serbian First League. A couple of months later, he came to the Jedinstvo team for the third time. Petrović was the second-best scorer of Jedinstvo in the half-season of 2019, with one goal behind the best scorer of the team. However, the season was interrupted due to the COVID-19 pandemic.

In the summer of 2023, Petrović left Jedinstvo to join Višesava on a free transfer.
