= Slavko Ćulibrk =

Serbian footballer

Personal information
- Full name: Slavko Ćulibrk
- Date of birth: 21 March 1986 (age 40)
- Place of birth: Kikinda, SFR Yugoslavia
- Height: 1.90 m (6 ft 3 in)
- Position: Centre-back

Team information
- Current team: Sloboda Novi Kozarci

Youth career
- OFK Kikinda

Senior career*
Years	Team	Apps	(Gls)
2003–2009	OFK Kikinda	62	(2)
2004	→ Mladost Lukićevo (loan)	2	(0)
2006–2007	→ Sloboda Novi Kozarci (loan)		
- → Senta (loan)
2009–2011	Banat Zrenjanin	54	(6)
2011–2012	Sloboda Užice	22	(0)
2013	Rabotnički	7	(0)
2013–2014	Voždovac	6	(0)
2014–2015	Drina Zvornik	15	(0)
2015	Zemun	12	(0)
2016	Drina Zvornik	11	(1)
2016–	Sloboda Novi Kozarci		
- * Club domestic league appearances and goals as of 19 June 2016

Slavko Ćulibrk (Serbian Cyrillic: Славко Ћулибрк; born 21 March 1984) is a professional football player who plays for Sloboda Novi Kozarci.

== Career ==
A guy from Kikinda, son of football coach, began his career in his hometown club OFK Kikinda. In addition, he played on loan at the Sloboda Novi Kozarci, Senta and a half year in the Mladost Lukićevo.

After that, he played for Banat Zrenjanin in the Serbian First League, and two years later moved to the SuperLiga club Sloboda Užice.

In Užice he played for one year, not always the first choice for coach Ljubiša Stamenković. In January 2013, he went to Rabotnički in Skopje.

In summer of 2013, he returned to Serbia, signed Voždovac.
