= Nikola Maksimović =

Serbian footballer

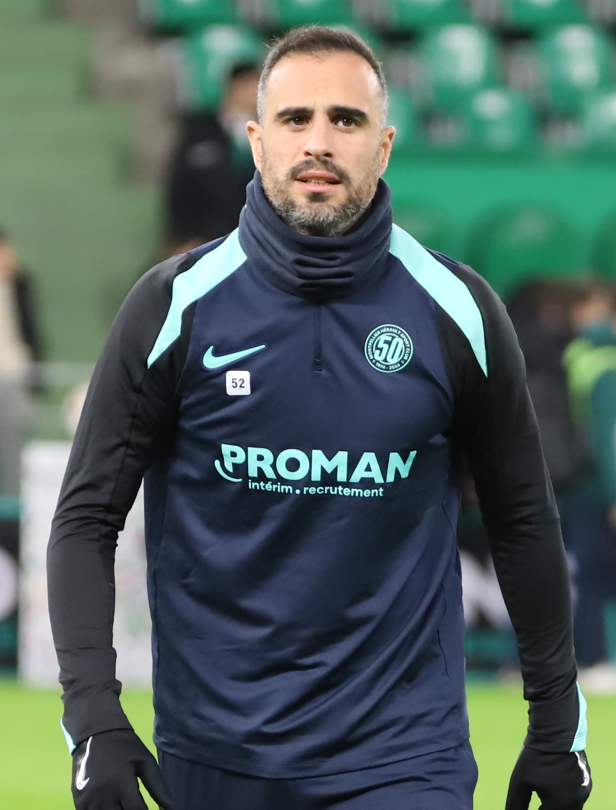
- Maksimović with Montpellier in 2024

Personal information
- Date of birth: 25 November 1991 (age 34)
- Place of birth: Bajina Bašta, SR Serbia, Yugoslavia
- Height: 1.93 m (6 ft 4 in)
- Position: Centre-back

Team information
- Current team: Kustošija

Youth career
- Kosmos Bajina Bašta
- Sloga Bajina Bašta

Senior career*
Years	Team	Apps	(Gls)
2008–2010	Sevojno	31	(2)
2010–2012	Sloboda Užice	32	(1)
2012–2013	Red Star Belgrade	25	(1)
2013–2014	→ Torino (loan)	23	(0)
2014–2016	Torino	43	(0)
2016–2021	Napoli	66	(2)
2018	→ Spartak Moscow (loan)	9	(0)
2021–2022	Genoa	14	(0)
2023–2024	Hatayspor	18	(0)
2024–2025	Montpellier	7	(0)
2025–	Kustošija	0	(0)

International career^{‡}
2012–2020	Serbia	25	(0)
- * Club domestic league appearances and goals as of 25 May 2025 ‡ National team caps and goals as of 3 September 2020

Nikola Maksimović (Serbian Cyrillic: Никола Максимовић, pronounced [nǐkola maksǐːmoʋitɕ]; born 25 November 1991) is a Serbian professional footballer who plays as a centre-back for Kustošija.

== Club career ==
=== Early career ===
Maksimović began his career with Kosmos Bajina Bašta, before moving to Sloga Bajina Bašta. He represented both clubs in youth competitions. Maksimović made his senior debut for Sevojno in the 2008–09 Serbian First League. He also played against FBK Kaunas and Lille in the 2009–10 UEFA Europa League.

In the summer of 2010, Sevojno merged with Sloboda Užice. On 19 September 2010, Maksimović received the first yellow card of his career during a match against Spartak Subotica, and scored the first goal of his professional career on 5 March 2011 in Lučani.

=== Red Star ===
During the 2012 winter transfer window, Maksimović was signed by Red Star Belgrade for a reported fee of 300,000€. He made his debut on 3 March 2012 in a match against Spartak Subotica.

At the end of the season, 51% of his contract was acquired by Cypriots Apollon Limassol.

=== Torino ===
On 23 July 2013, he was loaned to Italian Serie A club Torino with a buyout clause; he made his official debut on 6 October as a substitute against Sampdoria in Genoa, finishing 2–2. Over the course of the season he earned a spot in the starting lineup, first, as a central defender, then as a right-sided midfielder.

On 27 May 2014, Torino exercised the right to purchase him outright; Maksimović signed a contract until 2018.

=== Napoli ===
On 31 August 2016 he was transferred to Napoli on loan with obligation to buy. On 28 September 2016, Maksimović made his debut in 4–2 home victory over Benfica. On 23 October 2016, he scored his first goal in Serie A, in 2–1 away victory over Crotone.

=== Spartak ===
On 26 January 2018, he joined the Russian champions FC Spartak Moscow on loan until the end of the 2017–18 season.

=== Genoa ===
On 31 August 2021, Maksimović signed with Genoa for free.

=== Hatayspor ===
After not playing in the 2022–23 season, on 7 July 2023 Maksimović joined Hatayspor in Turkey on a two-year contract.

=== Montpellier ===
On 31 October 2024, Maksimović signed with Montpellier for free.

== International career ==
He made 4 appearances for the Serbia national youth teams: two with the under-19 and two with the under-21. He was first called up to the Serbia national team on 31 May 2012, for two friendly matches against France and Sweden, in which he was played as a starter. He returned for two friendlies against Ireland (where he entered in the second half) and Chile (from the onset), a 3–1 win.

As of November 2024, Maksimović has earned a total of 25 caps (no goals) and his final international was a September 2020 Nations League match away against Russia.

== Style of play ==
Able to play as a defensive midfielder, he grew up playing mainly as a central defender. He is agile for his considerable height of 1.93 metres (6 ft 4 in), combined with a predisposition for the air and marking opponents. At home he has been repeatedly compared to Nemanja Vidić.

== Career statistics ==
=== Club ===
As of match played 22 May 2022.

Club	Season	League			Cup		Europe		Other		Total	
Club	Season	Division	Apps	Goals	Apps	Goals	Apps	Goals	Apps	Goals	Apps	Goals
Sevojno	2008–09	Serbian First League	7	0			—		—		7	0
Sevojno	2009–10	Serbian First League	24	2			3 (Note: All appearances in UEFA Europa League)	0	—		27	2
Sevojno	Total		31	2			3	0	—		34	2
Sloboda Užice	2010–11	Serbian SuperLiga	20	1	3	0	—		—		23	1
Sloboda Užice	2011–12	Serbian SuperLiga	12	0	1	0	—		—		13	0
Sloboda Užice	Total		32	1	4	0	—		—		36	1
Red Star Belgrade	2011–12	Serbian SuperLiga	12	0	3	0	—		—		15	0
Red Star Belgrade	2012–13	Serbian SuperLiga	13	1	1	0	6	0	—		20	1
Red Star Belgrade	Total		25	1	4	0	6	0	—		35	1
Torino	2013–14	Serie A	23	0	0	0	—		—		23	0
Torino	2014–15	Serie A	27	0	1	0	9	0	—		37	0
Torino	2015–16	Serie A	16	0	0	0	—		—		16	0
Torino	Total		66	0	1	0	9	0	—		76	0
Napoli	2016–17	Serie A	8	1	2	0	2 (Note: All appearances in UEFA Champions League)	0	—		12	1
Napoli	2017–18	Serie A	2	0	1	0	1	0	—		4	0
Napoli	2018–19	Serie A	17	0	2	0	9 (Note: Five appearances in UEFA Champions League, four appearances in UEFA Europa League)	0	—		28	0
Napoli	2019–20	Serie A	22	1	3	0	3	0	—		28	1
Napoli	2020–21	Serie A	17	0	2	0	8	0	0	0	27	0
Napoli	Total		66	2	10	0	23	0	0	0	99	2
Spartak Moscow (loan)	2017–18	Russian Premier League	9	0	2	0	—		—		11	0
Genoa	2021–22	Serie A	14	0	0	0	—		—		14	0
Career total			243	6	21	0	41	0	0	0	305	6

=== International ===
As of 3 September 2020

Serbia
Year	Apps	Goals
2012	4	0
2013	0	0
2014	1	0
2015	2	0
2016	8	0
2017	4	0
2018	1	0
2019	4	0
2020	1	0
Total	25	0

== Honours ==
=== Club ===
Red Star Belgrade

- Serbian Cup: 2011–12

Napoli

- Coppa Italia: 2019–20

=== Individual ===
- Serbian SuperLiga Team of the Year: 2011–12
