= Marko Milosavljević =

Serbian footballer

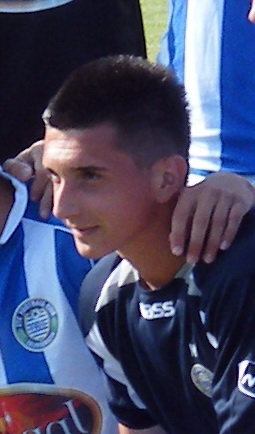

Personal information
- Full name: Marko Milosavljević
- Date of birth: 21 April 1985 (age 41)
- Place of birth: Smederevo, SFR Yugoslavia
- Height: 1.78 m (5 ft 10 in)
- Position: Midfielder

Senior career*
Years	Team	Apps	(Gls)
2004–2006	Železničar Smederevo	42	(2)
2006–2007	ČSK Čelarevo	1	(0)
2007–2009	Sloga Petrovac	37	(2)
2009–2013	Smederevo	84	(6)
2012	→ OFK Mihajlovac (loan)		
2016–2020	OFK Mihajlovac		
2020	RSK Rabrovo		
2021	Zvižd Kučevo		
- * Club domestic league appearances and goals

Marko Milosavljević (Serbian Cyrillic: Марко Милосављевић; born 21 April 1985) is a Serbian retired footballer who played as a midfielder.
