= Marin Miok =

Serbian footballer

Personal information
- Full name: Marin Miok
- Date of birth: 19 November 1985 (age 40)
- Place of birth: Belgrade, SFR Yugoslavia
- Height: 1.86 m (6 ft 1 in)
- Position: Midfielder

Senior career*
Years	Team	Apps	(Gls)
2003–2004	Red Star Belgrade	0	(0)
2004	→ Radnički Pirot (loan)	3	(1)
2004–2005	Grafičar Beograd	45	(6)
2005–2006	Tavriya Simferopol	0	(0)
2006–2008	Banat Zrenjanin	19	(0)
2008–2009	Ventspils	0	(0)
2009–2010	Sevojno	4	(0)
2010–2011	Oțelul Galați	0	(0)
2012	Radnički Sombor	12	(1)
2013–2014	Vršac		
2015	Zlatibor Čajetina		
- * Club domestic league appearances and goals

Marin Miok (Serbian Cyrillic: Марин Миок; born 19 November 1985) is a Serbian retired footballer who played as a midfielder.
