= Ricardinho (footballer, born June 1989) =

Brazilian footballer

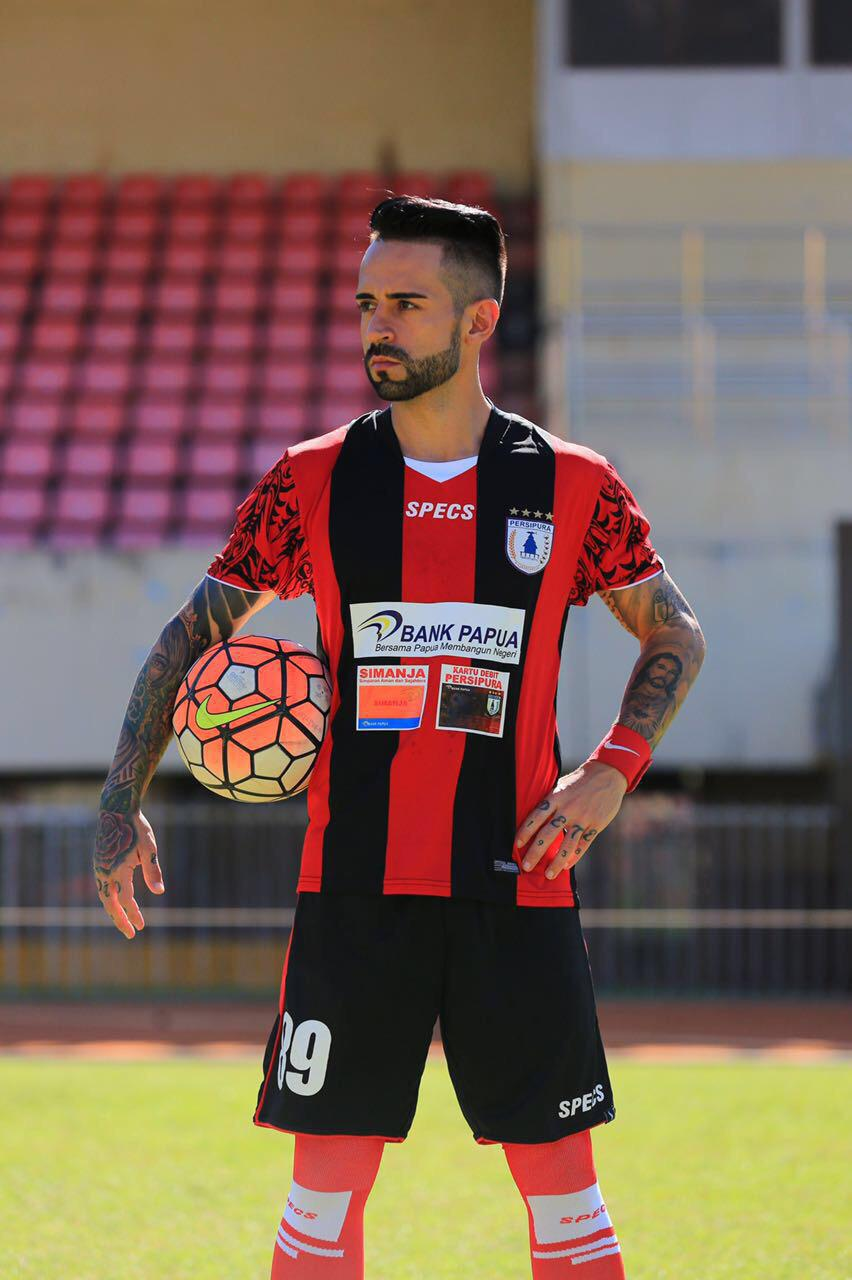

Personal information
- Full name: Ricardo Silva de Almeida
- Date of birth: 2 June 1989 (age 37)
- Place of birth: São Paulo, Brazil
- Height: 1.70 m (5 ft 7 in)
- Position: Midfielder

Team information
- Current team: Persik Kediri

Youth career
- 2002–2003: Corinthians
- 2004: Osasco
- 2005: Sport Barueri
- 2006: Nacional (SP)
- 2007: União Mogi
- 2008: Assisense

Senior career*
| Years | Team | Apps | (Gls) |
| 2008 | Assisense | | |
| 2009 | Comercial do Registro | | |
| 2010 | AA São Bento | | |
| 2011 | Corinthians B | | |
| 2011 | Sloboda Užice | 3 | (0) |
| 2012 | Marília | 4 | (0) |
| 2012 | Roma | 9 | (0) |
| 2013 | Borac Čačak | 2 | (0) |
| 2014 | Operário | 5 | (0) |
| 2014 | Stade Tunisien | | |
| 2015 | Tigres do Brasil | 5 | (0) |
| 2015 | Queimados FC | | |
| 2015 | Guabirá | | |
| 2016 | Real Estelí | 12 | (0) |
| 2016 | Managua | | |
| 2017 | Persipura Jayapura | 7 | (0) |
| 2018 | CA Juventus | 3 | (0) |
| 2018 | Trang | | |
| 2018 | Zeravani | | |
| 2019 | Episkopi | | |
| 2019–2020 | Senglea Athletic | 6 | (1) |
| 2020– | Persik Kediri | | |
- * Club domestic league appearances and goals as of 18 March 2020

Ricardo Silva de Almeida (born 2 June 1989), commonly known as Ricardinho, is a Brazilian football who plays as a midfielder for Indonesian club Persik Kediri.

== Career ==
Born in São Paulo, Ricardinho played in Brazil with Corinthians B. During the second part of the 2010–11 season, he played three matches for Serbian SuperLiga club Sloboda Užice. After that he returned to Brazil. At the beginning of 2013, he returned to Serbia to Borac Čačak. By the end of 2013 he returned to Brazil ald joined Operário playing in the Campeonato Paranaense.

In summer 2014 he signed with Stade Tunisien.

In August 2015 he signed with Bolivian club Guabirá.

Ricardinho joined Greek side Episkopi in Greece in January 2019.

== Honours ==
Real Estelí

- Nicaraguan Primera División: 2015–16
