= FK Železničar 1930 =

Železničar 1930
- Full name: Fudbalski klub Železničar 1930
- Nickname: Želja
- Founded: 1930; 96 years ago
- Ground: Želvoz Stadium
- Capacity: 1,200
- League: Smederevo League - First Division
- 2024–25: Smederevo League - First Division, 10th
Home colours	Away colours

Fudbalski klub Železničar 1930 (Serbian Cyrillic: Фудбалски клуб Железничар 1930) is a Serbian football club based in Smederevo.

== History ==
The club was founded in 1930. The stadium of Železničar has about 300 blue and white seats. The most popular player of the team was Ljubiša Stamenković, who later played for OFK Beograd.

In the 2003–04 season the team got relegated from third league, Serbian League West. One of the most successful seasons in their history was in 2001–02 season when they almost got into the Second League of FR Yugoslavia.

== Recent league history ==
Season	Division	P	W	D	L	F	A	Pts	Pos
2021–22	7 - Smederevo League - Second Division	16	7	0	9	33	22	21	5th
2022–23	6 - Smederevo League - First Division	20	7	2	11	27	33	23	8th
2023–24	6 - Smederevo League - First Division	22	11	5	6	55	39	38	5th
2024–25	6 - Smederevo League - First Division	22	7	2	13	38	61	23	10th
