= Igor Stanisavljević =

Serbian footballer

Personal information
- Date of birth: 3 August 1978 (age 48)
- Place of birth: Split, SFR Yugoslavia
- Height: 1.82 m (5 ft 11 1/2 in)
- Position: Defender

Youth career
- 1990–1993: Hajduk Split

Senior career*
Years	Team	Apps	(Gls)
1993–1997	Budućnost Podgorica	64	(10)
1997–1998	Borac Čačak	11	(1)
1998–1999	Sloboda Užice	33	(6)
1999–2003	Železnik	56	(3)
2001–2002	→ Sloboda Užice (loan)	14	(5)
2002	→ Dorćol (loan)	16	(1)
2003–2005	Radnički Beograd	24	(1)
2004	→ Kom (loan)	11	(0)
2005–2007	Mladenovac	64	(6)
2007–2009	Inđija	56	(10)
2009–2010	Sevojno	30	(1)
2010–2011	Sloboda Užice	16	(0)
Total		395	(44)
- * Club domestic league appearances and goals

Igor Stanisavljević (Serbian Cyrillic: Игор Станисављевић; born 3 August 1978) is a Serbian football defender.

Born in Split, SR Croatia, after playing in the youth team of HNK Hajduk Split he moved in 1993 to FR Yugoslavia and made his debut as senior with FK Budućnost Podgorica. During the following 15 years he would play for numerous Serbian top league clubs, such as FK Borac Čačak, FK Sloboda Užice, FK Železnik, FK Radnički Beograd and FK Kom.
