= Vašarište =

- Village
- Location within Bosnia and Herzegovina
- Coordinates: 44.4354186°N 18.0294586°E
- Country: Bosnia and Herzegovina
- Entity: Federation of Bosnia and Herzegovina
- Canton: Zenica-Doboj
- Municipality: Žepče

Area
  - Total: 0.39 sq mi (1.00 km^{2})

Population (2013)
  - Total: 566
  - Density: 1,470/sq mi (566/km^{2})
- Time zone: UTC+1 (CET)
  - Summer (DST): UTC+2 (CEST)

Vašarište is a village in the municipality of Žepče, Bosnia and Herzegovina.

== Demographics ==
According to the 2013 census, its population was 566.

Ethnicity in 2013
Ethnicity	Number	Percentage
Bosniaks	386	68.2%
Croats	177	31.3%
other/undeclared	3	0.5%
Total	566	100%
