= Danijel Morariju =

Serbian footballer (born 1991)

Personal information
- Date of birth: 1 January 1991 (age 35)
- Place of birth: Grebenac, SFR Yugoslavia
- Height: 1.80 m (5 ft 11 in)
- Position: Left-back

Team information
- Current team: ASV Salzburg
- Number: 33

Senior career*
Years	Team	Apps	(Gls)
2009–2011	Čukarički	23	(2)
2011–2013	Mladi Radnik	19	(0)
2013	Lushnja	2	(0)
2014–2015	Poli Timișoara	13	(0)
2015	AFC United	12	(0)
2015–2016	Kolubara	9	(0)
2016–2017	Austria Salzburg	21	(2)
2017–2018	Oberndorfer SK	29	(13)
2019	Austria Salzburg	3	(0)
2019–2020	ASV Salzburg	19	(12)
2021–2022	USV St. Pantaleon	18	(1)
2022–2023	ATSV Salzburg	21	(4)
2024–	ASV Salzburg	31	(6)
- * Club domestic league appearances and goals as of 18 January 2025

Danijel Morariju (Serbian Cyrillic: Данијел Морарију, Romanian: Daniel Morariu; born 1 January 1991) is a Serbian football defender who plays for Austrian club ASV Salzburg.
