= Miloš Žeravica =

Serbian footballer

Personal information
- Full name: Miloš Žeravica
- Date of birth: 22 July 1988 (age 38)
- Place of birth: Zrenjanin, SFR Yugoslavia
- Height: 1.77 m (5 ft 10 in)
- Position: Midfielder

Youth career
- Proleter Zrenjanin

Senior career*
Years	Team	Apps	(Gls)
2004–2005	Proleter Zrenjanin	8	(0)
2005–2013	OFK Beograd	71	(5)
2006–2008	→ Palilulac Beograd (loan)	49	(3)
2013	→ Napredak Kruševac (loan)	7	(0)
2013–2014	Sloboda Užice	23	(3)
2014–2015	Borac Banja Luka	20	(0)
2015–2017	Zrinjski Mostar	37	(0)
2017	Grindavík	20	(1)
2018–2019	Borac Banja Luka	34	(1)
2019–2020	Sileks	31	(2)
2021	OFK Vršac		
2021–2022	Bečej		
2022	Naftagas Elemir		
Total		300	(15)
- * Club domestic league appearances and goals as of 22 May 2021

Miloš Žeravica (Serbian Cyrillic: Милош Жеравица; born 22 Јuly 1988) is a Serbian retired footballer who plays as a midfielder.

== Honours ==
Napredak Kruševac

- Serbian First League: 2012–13

Zrinjski Mostar

- Bosnian Premier League: 2015–16

Borac Banja Luka

- First League of RS: 2018–19
