= Borislav Terzić =

Bosnian professional footballer (born 1991)

Personal information
- Full name: Borislav Terzić
- Date of birth: 1 November 1991 (age 35)
- Place of birth: Vlasenica, Bosna i Hercegovina
- Height: 1.84 m (6 ft 1/2 in)
- Position: Right-back

Team information
- Current team: Trayal Kruševac

Youth career
- Obilić

Senior career*
Years	Team	Apps	(Gls)
2009–2011	Lokomotiva Beograd	2	(0)
2011–2012	BASK	24	(0)
2012	Zemun	13	(2)
2013	Donji Srem	12	(0)
2013	Zestaponi	2	(0)
2014	Sloboda Užice	15	(0)
2014–2015	Radnički Kragujevac	19	(0)
2015–2016	Voždovac	19	(2)
2016–2017	Javor Ivanjica	21	(0)
2018–2019	Sloboda Tuzla	16	(1)
2019	Zemun	3	(0)
2019	Tuzla City	15	(0)
2020	Zvijezda 09		
2021–	Trayal Kruševac	10	(0)
- * Club domestic league appearances and goals as of 9 November 2019

Borislav Terzić (Serbian Cyrillic: Борислав Терзић; born 1 November 1991) is a Bosnian professional footballer who plays as a right-back for Serbian side Trayal Kruševac.

== Club career ==
Terzić started his career at FK Lokomotiva Beograd, then he played for FK BASK and FK Zemun. He moved to FK Donji Srem, and made his debut in the highest rank of the Serbian football league, the Serbian SuperLiga. Also, he had two appearances for FC Zestaponi in Georgian Premier League. In a winter break of the 2013–14 season, he signed with FK Sloboda Užice.

In January 2018, Terzić signed with FK Sloboda Tuzla. After Sloboda, he also played with Zemun once again, before coming back to Bosnia and singing with FK Tuzla City on 8 June 2019. Terzić made his official debut for Tuzla City on 20 July 2019, in a 1–5 away league win against FK Zvijezda 09. On 27 November 2019, Terzić and Tuzla City terminated his contract on mutual agreement.
