= Nebojša Prtenjak =

Serbian footballer

Personal information
- Full name: Nebojša Prtenjak
- Date of birth: 10 May 1983 (age 43)
- Place of birth: Čačak, SFR Yugoslavia
- Height: 1.80 m (5 ft 11 in)
- Position: Winger

Senior career*
Years	Team	Apps	(Gls)
2001–2002	Mladost Lučani	20	(2)
2003–2006	Srem	114	(23)
2006–2007	Mladost Apatin	6	(0)
2007–2008	Mladost Lučani	24	(9)
2008–2011	Borac Čačak	65	(5)
2011	Sloboda Užice	13	(2)
2012	Taraz	11	(1)
2012	Mladost Lučani	9	(1)
2013	Voždovac	11	(0)
2013–2014	Čelik Nikšić	21	(2)
2014	Sloboda Užice	12	(1)
2015	Dečić		
2015	Dragačevo Guča		
2016	Miokovci		
2017–2018	Dragačevo Guča		
- * Club domestic league appearances and goals as of 18 June 2019

Nebojša Prtenjak (Serbian Cyrillic: Небојша Пртењак; born 10 May 1983) is a Serbian professional footballer who plays as a winger.

== Career ==
Born in Čačak, Prtenjak started out at Mladost Lučani, making his debut during the 2001–02 First League of FR Yugoslavia, as the club suffered relegation to the Second League. He later switched to fellow Second League club Srem in the 2002–03 winter transfer window. While playing at Stadion Promenada, Prtenjak was teammates with two future Serbia national team players, Branislav Ivanović and Igor Đurić. He later joined Mladost Apatin, making his Serbian SuperLiga debut in the competition's inaugural season.

In the summer of 2007, Prtenjak returned to his former club Mladost Lučani. He went on to have his best season ever in the 2007–08 Serbian SuperLiga, scoring nine goals in 24 appearances. When the club withdrew from the league due to financial problems, Prtenjak moved to local rivals Borac Čačak. He played for the club in two games against Ajax in the 2008–09 UEFA Cup and spent a total of three seasons with the Zebre.
