= Edin Selimović =

Serbian footballer

Personal information
- Full name: Edin Selimović
- Date of birth: 28 January 1991 (age 35)
- Place of birth: Novi Pazar, SFR Yugoslavia
- Height: 1.77 m (5 ft 9 1/2 in)
- Position: Winger

Youth career
- Novi Pazar

Senior career*
Years	Team	Apps	(Gls)
2010–2016	Novi Pazar	32	(1)
2012	→ Berane (loan)	6	(0)
2016–2018	Modafen	44	(11)
2018–2019	Moravac Mrštane		
2019–2020	Novi Pazar	27	(2)
2020–2022	Sloboda Užice		
- * Club domestic league appearances and goals as of 17:28, 20 January 2021 (UTC)

Edin Selimović (Serbian Cyrillic: Един Селимовић, born 28 January 1991) is a Serbian football midfielder.
