= Vuk Đurić =

Serbian-born Montenegrin footballer

Personal information
- Full name: Vuk Đurić
- Date of birth: 30 September 1988 (age 38)
- Place of birth: Bajina Bašta, SFR Yugoslavia
- Height: 1.83 m (6 ft 0 in)
- Position: Midfielder

Senior career*
| Years | Team | Apps | (Gls) |
| 2005–2007 | Sloboda Užice | 29 | (3) |
| 2007–2009 | Zeta | | |
| 2009–2010 | Srem | 18 | (0) |
| 2011 | Hajduk Kula | 3 | (0) |
| 2011–2012 | Sloboda Užice | 0 | (0) |
| 2012–2013 | Voždovac | 12 | (1) |
| 2013 | Sinđelić Beograd | 1 | (0) |
| 2013–2015 | Jedinstvo Užice | 42 | (0) |
| 2015–2016 | Sloboda Užice | 17 | (0) |
| 2016–2017 | Sloga Bajina Bašta | | |
| 2017– | Jedinstvo Užice | | |

International career^{‡}
| 2009 | Montenegro U21 | 2 | (0) |
- * Club domestic league appearances and goals as of 29 May 2016 ‡ National team caps and goals as of 1 August 2013

Vuk Đurić (Serbian Cyrillic: Вук Ђурић; born 30 September 1988) is a Serbian-born Montenegrin football midfielder.

He had played with Serbian club FK Sloboda Užice, Montenegrin First League club FK Zeta and back in Serbia with FK Srem.

He was part of the Montenegro national under-21 football team.
