= Nemanja Lekanić =

Bosnian footballer

Personal information
- Date of birth: 10 January 1990 (age 36)
- Place of birth: Sarajevo, SFR Yugoslavia
- Height: 1.72 m (5 ft 8 in)
- Position: Right midfielder

Team information
- Current team: Olimpik
- Number: 46

Youth career
- 2009: Partizan

Senior career*
Years	Team	Apps	(Gls)
2008	Sinđelić Beograd	12	(0)
2009–2010	Dorćol	26	(0)
2010	Zemun	5	(0)
2011	Mladenovac	4	(0)
2011–2013	Sinđelić Beograd	49	(10)
2013	Sloga Kraljevo	14	(0)
2014	Sloboda Užice	0	(0)
2014–2015	Smederevo 1924	13	(1)
2015–2017	Mačva Šabac	41	(8)
2017–2018	Sinđelić Beograd	21	(0)
2018–2019	Sloga Gornje Crnjelovo	16	(2)
2019	Borac Banja Luka	11	(2)
2020–	Olimpik	21	(3)
- * Club domestic league appearances and goals as of 21 March 2021

Nemanja Lekanić (Serbian Cyrillic: Немања Леканић; born 10 January 1990) is a Bosnian professional footballer who plays as a right midfielder for Bosnian Premier League club Olimpik.

== Career ==
Born in Sarajevo, the capital of SR Bosnia and Herzegovina, back then within SFR Yugoslavia, Lekanić played in Serbia for almost his whole career. Starting at the youth team of Partizan, he later played with Sinđelić Beograd in Serbian League Belgrade, with Dorćol at same level, Zemun in the Serbian First League, then Mladenovac at Serbian League Belgrade, Sloga Kraljevo in the Serbian First League, then second half of the 2013–14 Serbian SuperLiga season with Sloboda Užice, although he didn't make nay appearances, then with Smederevo 1924 in the Serbian League West, until the summer of 2015 when he joined Mačva Šabac.

His move to Mačva was decisive because he was part of a generation that made the club climb two levels in just two seasons, and also making him debut in the 2017–18 Serbian SuperLiga. However, after the initial stat of the season, Lekanić still in the early stage moved to Sinđelić Beograd, playing in the 2017–18 Serbian First League. He then joined Bosnian club Sloga Gornje Crnjelovo in the summer of 2018, then playing in the First League of RS. In March 2019, he joined Borac Banja Luka, with whom he secured promotion to the 2019–20 Bosnian Premier League.

On 13 January 2020, Lekanić signed a contract with, at the time, First League of FBiH club Olimpik. On 26 May 2020, the 2019–20 First League of FBiH season ended abruptly due to the COVID-19 pandemic in Bosnia and Herzegovina and, by default, Lekanić with Olimpik were crowned league champions and got promoted back to the Bosnian Premier League.

== Honours ==
Mačva Šabac

- Serbian First League: 2016–17
- Serbian League West: 2015–16

Borac Banja Luka

- First League of RS: 2018–19

Olimpik

- First League of FBiH: 2019–20
