= Bojan Beljić =

Serbian footballer

Personal information
- Full name: Bojan Beljić
- Date of birth: 8 May 1985 (age 41)
- Place of birth: Lazarevac, SFR Yugoslavia
- Height: 1.76 m (5 ft 9 1/2 in)
- Position: Midfielder

Team information
- Current team: Napredak Medoševac

Senior career*
Years	Team	Apps	(Gls)
2004–2008	Kolubara	97	(26)
2009–2011	Jagodina	55	(6)
2011	Shahrdari Tabriz	10	(0)
2012	Sloboda Užice	28	(6)
2013–2014	Radnički Kragujevac	40	(8)
2014	Donji Srem	14	(2)
2015	BEC Tero Sasana	3	(0)
2015–2017	Napredak Kruševac	30	(12)
2017–2018	Jedinstvo Ub		
2018–2021	Turbina Vreoci		
2021	Borac 1966		
2022-	Napredak Medoševac		
- * Club domestic league appearances and goals as of 22 April 2017

Bojan Beljić (Serbian Cyrillic: Бојан Бељић; born 8 May 1985) is a Serbian professional footballer who plays for Napredak Medoševac, as an attacking midfielder.

After starting out at Kolubara, Beljić went on to play for various clubs, most notably Jagodina, Sloboda Užice and Radnički Kragujevac.

== Honours ==
Napredak Kruševac

- Serbian First League: 2015–16
