= Ljubiša Stamenković =

Serbian footballer and manager

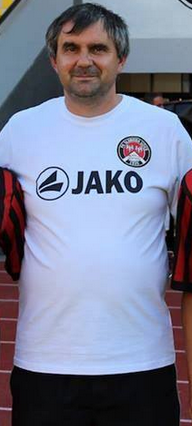
- Stamenković in 2013

Personal information
- Date of birth: 21 July 1964 (age 62)
- Place of birth: Vlasotince, SFR Yugoslavia

Senior career*
Years	Team	Apps	(Gls)
- Železničar Smederevo
1988–1990	OFK Beograd	27	(6)
- Smederevo
- Mladi Radnik
- Balkan Mirijevo
- Vranovo

Managerial career
- Mladost Goša (assistant)
- 1997–1998: Zvezdara (assistant)
- 1998–1999: Mladi Radnik Radinac
- 1999–2000: Mladi Radnik
- 2000–2001: Napredak Kušiljevo
- 2001–2002: Mladenovac
- 2002–2003: Timok
- 2003–2006: Sevojno
- 2006–2007: Mladenovac
- 2007–2008: Bežanija
- 2008–2010: Sevojno
- 2010–2014: Sloboda Užice
- 2015: Napredak Kruševac
- 2016: Borac Čačak
- 2016–2017: OFK Beograd
- 2018: Smederevo
- 2019–2020: Jagodina
- 2024: Sloboda Užice
- 2025: Sloboda Užice
- * Club domestic league appearances and goals

Ljubiša "Piskavac" Stamenković (Serbian Cyrillic: Љубиша "Пискавац" Стаменковић; born 21 July 1964) is a Serbian football manager.

== Playing career ==
Born in Vlasotince, he spent almost whole his life in Smederevo, where he started playing for local club Železničar. Then he has moved to Belgrade for studies and joined OFK Beograd just to spend a short time there. For most of his career he played for lower league level clubs Smederevo and Mladi Radnik whose shirts he has worn on several occasions. At the end of playing career, he played for Balkan Mirijevo and Vranovo.

== Coaching career ==
After retiring as a player, Stamenković has started working as an assistant coach with Velimir Ciga Đorđević.

=== Sevojno (2003–2006): First success ===
In the middle of 2003, then 39-year-old Stamenković took the job at then 3rd league club Sevojno. In his first season the club finished short in achieving promotion finished second, 11 points behind the promoted Mladost Lučani The following season the club achieved what they failed the previous season, promotion. In the 2005–06 season they found themselves in the second division and finished in a respectable 8th spot, thus avoiding relegation, which was the goal at the beginning of the season. That was undoubtedly his first successful period as a coach.

=== Mladenovac (2006–2007) ===
After leaving Sevojno, Stamenković returned to his old club Mladenovac which then played in the Serbian First League second highest tier in Serbian football. They finished in a solid 10th position and were 4 points short of promotion play-offs, the main reason being too many draws.

=== Bežanija (2007–2008): First job in the top flight of Serbia ===
Stamenković started the season as OFK Mladenovac coach but in October 2007 Bežanija, struggling in the Jelen SuperLiga with only one win, offered the job to Stamenković. His job was to help the club survive and avoid relegation. In the end he failed to achieve survival in the league. Under his management the club only won four games and was relegated convincingly. This was the first time Stamenković managed in the top tier of Serbian football.

=== Sevojno and Sloboda Užice (2008–2014): Most successful period ===
Stamenković returned to the club in which he had his biggest success, Sevojno which also played in the Serbian First League, just so he could make the biggest success in history of the club, entering a Cup final, on the way beating Serbian giants Red Star and thus achieved UEFA Europa League qualifications. In the league, however, they were not that successful and finished 7th, 4 points behind promotion.

The following season club started in the UEFA Europa League qualification where his second division club knocked out Lithuanian side FBK Kaunas, but next rival, French Lille were too strong and they lost 4–0 on aggregate. However, this season the club achieved promotion finishing 2nd in the First League and thus achieving the joy of playing in the highest rank of Serbian football.

That summer (2010) Sevojno and Sloboda Užice have merged. In his first full season in the elite rank Sloboda finished in 6th place and again being successful in the Serbian Cup reaching the semi-finals, but losing to Vojvodina 3–1 on aggregate.

In the 2011–12 season the club finished 5th and didn't achieve the Europa League qualifications on goal difference. That was also the highest ranking in the history of the club.

The 2012–13 season was the same as they finished 5th again.

On 26 October 2013, Stamenković coached his 100th SuperLiga game with Sloboda, against Javor at home. However, Sloboda lost 1–0.

On 6 November 2013, Stamenković, alongside Milovan Rajevac, was selected to be the head coach of the media selection team that would play Serbia national football team in a revival match in Užice. Media selected Stamenković because he is the longest serving coach in the Serbian SuperLiga and the first person to be in charge of a club for 100 games in the Serbian SuperLiga. Media selection team lost 2–0.

On 23 November 2013, Stamenković coached his 200th game since joining the club in 2008. Sloboda lost 4–1 to Red Star Belgrade. On 26 April 2014, Sloboda lost 4–0 to Jagodina at home, this being their biggest defeat at home under Stamenković. In the final round of the 2013–14 season, Sloboda lost to Voždovac 1–0 at home, and finished in 16th place therefore being relegated. At the end of the season Stamenković left Sloboda after four years with the club.

He was appointed manager of Napredak Kruševac in May 2015 and managed FK Borac Čačak in the 2015–16 Serbian SuperLiga season.

== Nickname ==
Stamenković is rarely mentioned after his full name, instead he is referred as "Piskavac" (Serbian word for whistler), the nickname that he has gained as a kid.

== Education ==
Beside a coaching licence, Stamenković has a diploma from a Faculty of Organizational Sciences in University of Belgrade.

== Attack after the match ==
On 13 April 2013, Stamenković's side Sloboda drew 2–2 with FK Vojvodina at Karađorđe Stadium in Novi Sad. After the match some unknown person hit Stamenković while he was going to the locker room. After the match a delegate said that Stamenković was indeed hit in the face but Stamenković denied it and said he only wanted to concentrate on football. After the investigation it was confirmed that Stamenković was hit and that the person who did it was in custody. Stamenković and the crowd had some exchanges during and after the game.

== Honours ==
=== Manager ===
Sevojno

- Serbian Cup Runner up: 2008–09
- Serbian First League Runner up: 2009–10

== Statistics ==
=== As a manager ===
As of 25 May 2025

Team	From	To	Record				
Team	From	To	G	W	D	L	Win %
Bežanija	15 October 2007	30 June 2008	26	4	3	19	15.38
Sevojno	1 July 2008	30 June 2010	79	31	25	23	39.24
Sloboda Užice	1 July 2010	1 June 2014	131	50	34	47	38.17
Napredak Kruševac	27 May 2015	3 June 2015	2	0	1	1	0.00
Borac Čačak	31 January 2016	23 April 2016	12	2	7	3	16.67
OFK Beograd	22 December 2016	5 April 2017	5	1	2	2	20.00
Smederevo 1924	19 March 2018	17 October 2018	24	12	5	7	50.00
Jagodina	1 July 2019	30 June 2020	17	12	3	2	70.59
Sloboda Užice	4 March 2024	26 November 2024	33	11	11	11	33.33
Sloboda Užice	6 February 2025	1 June 2025	17	4	4	9	23.53
Total			345	127	94	124	36.81

==== List of seasons ====
- UCL = UEFA Champions League
- UEL = UEFA Cup / UEFA Europa League

Champions	Runners-up	Third / SF	Promoted	Unfinished	Relegated

Season	Club	Domestic		International		Trophies
Season	Club	League	Cup	UCL	UEL	Trophies
2007–08	Bežanija	12th	R16			0
2008–09	Sevojno	7th ^{2}	RU			0
2009–10	Sevojno	2nd ^{2}	R16		3QR ^{1}	0
2010–11	Sloboda Užice	6th	SF			0
2011–12	Sloboda Užice	5th	R16			0
2012–13	Sloboda Užice	5th	1R			0
2013–14	Sloboda Užice	16th	QF			0
2014–15	Napredak Kruševac	14th				0
2015–16	Borac Čačak	7th	SF			0
2016–17	OFK Beograd	16th^{2}				0
2017–18	Smederevo 1924	3rd^{3}				0
2018–19	Smederevo 1924	3rd^{3}				0
2019–20	Jagodina	1st^{3}				1
2023–24	Sloboda Užice	12th^{2}				0
2024–25	Sloboda Užice	16th^{2}	1R			0

^{1} Third qualifying round
^{2} Second tier
^{3} Third tier
