= Predrag Lazić =

Serbian footballer

Personal information
- Full name: Predrag Lazić
- Date of birth: 15 January 1982 (age 44)
- Place of birth: Pristina, SFR Yugoslavia
- Height: 1.68 m (5 ft 6 in)
- Position: Winger

Senior career*
Years	Team	Apps	(Gls)
2001–2003	Obilić	12	(0)
2003	→ Mladi Obilić (loan)	11	(2)
2004	Kneževac	22	(6)
2005–2006	BSK Borča	49	(8)
2006–2007	Partizan	13	(1)
2007	→ Bežanija (loan)	13	(1)
2007	Bežanija	10	(1)
2008	OFK Beograd	14	(1)
2008–2009	Otopeni	23	(0)
2009–2010	Pandurii Târgu Jiu	17	(0)
2010–2011	Sloboda Užice	28	(5)
2011–2012	Aris Limassol	31	(2)
2012–2013	Ayia Napa	23	(0)
2013–2014	Ethnikos Achna	29	(2)
2014	Napredak Kruševac	10	(0)
2015	Radnik Surdulica	10	(1)
2016–2017	Kolubara	28	(2)
2017–2018	OFK Beograd	21	(1)
2018–2019	Radnički Obrenovac	27	(2)
Total		391	(35)
- * Club domestic league appearances and goals as of 29 October 2019

Predrag Lazić (Serbian Cyrillic: Предраг Лазић; born 15 January 1982) is a Serbian retired footballer who played as a winger.

== Career ==
In June 2006, Lazić signed a four-year contract with Partizan. He was loaned to Bežanija the following January. During his journeyman career, Lazić also spent five years abroad, playing for two Romanian and three Cypriot clubs.

== Honours ==
BSK Borča

- Serbian League Belgrade: 2005–06

Radnik Surdulica

- Serbian First League: 2014–15
