= Dino Dolmagić =

Serbian footballer

Personal information
- Date of birth: 26 February 1994 (age 32)
- Place of birth: Nova Varoš, FR Yugoslavia
- Height: 1.75 m (5 ft 9 in)
- Position: Attacking midfielder

Team information
- Current team: Dubočica
- Number: 50

Youth career
- Zlatar Nova Varoš

Senior career*
Years	Team	Apps	(Gls)
2011–2013	Zemun	47	(2)
2013–2016	Sloboda Užice	52	(1)
2016–2017	Inđija	25	(1)
2017	Breiðablik	7	(0)
2018–2020	Javor Ivanjica	55	(7)
2020–2022	TSC Bačka Topola	2	(0)
2022–2024	Javor Ivanjica	52	(1)
2024–2025	Radnik Surdulica	25	(4)
2026–	Dubočica	8	(0)

International career
2013	Serbia U19		
- * Club domestic league appearances and goals as of 14 May 2026

Dino Dolmagić (Serbian Cyrillic: Дино Долмагић; born 26 February 1994) is a Serbian professional footballer who plays as a midfielder for Dubočica.
