= Bojan Šejić =

Serbian footballer

Personal information
- Full name: Bojan Šejić
- Date of birth: 14 July 1983 (age 43)
- Place of birth: Niš, SFR Yugoslavia
- Height: 1.91 m (6 ft 3 in)
- Position: Goalkeeper

Senior career*
Years	Team	Apps	(Gls)
2001–2005	Kosanica	28	(0)
2005–2006	Napredak Kruševac	38	(0)
2006–2007	Zemun	0	(0)
2007	→ Radnički Niš (loan)	15	(0)
2007–2008	Radnički Niš	4	(0)
2008–2009	Napredak Kruševac	42	(0)
2010	Laktaši	11	(0)
2010–2012	Sloboda Užice	5	(0)
2013–2014	Sloga Kraljevo	37	(0)
2014–2015	Radnik Surdulica	33	(0)
Total		213	(0)
- * Club domestic league appearances and goals

Bojan Šejić (Serbian Cyrillic: Бојан Шејић; born July 14, 1983) is a Serbian football goalkeeper who last played for Radnik Surdulica.

== Honours ==
Radnik Surdulica

- Serbian First League: 2014–15
