= Vladimir Krstić (footballer) =

Serbian footballer

Personal information
- Full name: Vladimir Krstić
- Date of birth: 28 June 1987 (age 39)
- Place of birth: Valjevo, SFR Yugoslavia
- Height: 1.78 m (5 ft 10 in)
- Position: Right wing

Youth career
- 1993–2002: Budućnost Valjevo
- 2002–2007: Red Star Belgrade

Senior career*
| Years | Team | Apps | (Gls) |
| 2005–2006 | → Bečej (loan) | 30 | (11) |
| 2006–2007 | → Kolubara (loan) | 28 | (7) |
| 2007–2008 | Voždovac | 1 | (0) |
| 2007–2008 | → BSK Borča (loan) | 11 | (1) |
| 2008–2012 | BSK Borča | 79 | (8) |
| 2012–2013 | Sloboda Užice | 44 | (3) |
| 2014 | Sloga Petrovac na Mlavi | 14 | (1) |
| 2014 | Kolubara | 15 | (0) |
| 2015–2016 | Borac Čačak | 8 | (1) |
| 2016 | Napredak Kruševac | 1 | (0) |
| 2016 | Budućnost Krušik 2014 | | |
| 2017–2018 | Jedinstvo Ub | | |
| 2018–2019 | Budućnost Krušik 2014 | | |
- * Club domestic league appearances and goals

Vladimir Krstić (Serbian Cyrillic: Владимир Крстић; born 28 June 1987) is a retired Serbian footballer.

== Career statistics ==
As of 6 May 2016

| Club | Season | League | | Cup | | Continental | | Total | |
| Club | Season | Apps | Goals | Apps | Goals | Apps | Goals | Apps | Goals |
|---|---|---|---|---|---|---|---|---|---|
| Bečej (loan) | 2005–06 | 30 | 11 | 0 | 0 | 0 | 0 | 30 | 11 |
| Bečej (loan) | Total | 30 | 11 | 0 | 0 | 0 | 0 | 30 | 11 |
| Kolubara (loan) | 2006–07 | 28 | 7 | 0 | 0 | 0 | 0 | 28 | 7 |
| Kolubara (loan) | Total | 28 | 7 | 0 | 0 | 0 | 0 | 28 | 7 |
| Voždovac | 2007-08 | 1 | 0 | 0 | 0 | 0 | 0 | 1 | 0 |
| Voždovac | Total | 1 | 0 | 0 | 0 | 0 | 0 | 1 | 0 |
| BSK | 2007-08 (loan) | 11 | 1 | 0 | 0 | 0 | 0 | 11 | 1 |
| BSK | 2008-09 | 22 | 4 | 0 | 0 | 0 | 0 | 22 | 4 |
| BSK | 2009-10 | 20 | 2 | 0 | 0 | 0 | 0 | 22 | 2 |
| BSK | 2010-11 | 25 | 2 | 0 | 0 | 0 | 0 | 25 | 2 |
| BSK | 2011-12 | 12 | 0 | 1 | 0 | 0 | 0 | 13 | 0 |
| BSK | Total | 90 | 9 | 1 | 0 | 0 | 0 | 91 | 9 |
| Sloboda Užice | 2011-12 | 14 | 0 | 0 | 0 | 0 | 0 | 14 | 0 |
| Sloboda Užice | 2012-13 | 18 | 3 | 1 | 0 | 0 | 0 | 19 | 3 |
| Sloboda Užice | 2013-14 | 12 | 0 | 2 | 0 | 0 | 0 | 14 | 0 |
| Sloboda Užice | Total | 44 | 3 | 3 | 0 | 0 | 0 | 47 | 3 |
| Sloga PM | 2013-14 | 14 | 1 | 0 | 0 | 0 | 0 | 14 | 1 |
| Sloga PM | Total | 14 | 1 | 0 | 0 | 0 | 0 | 14 | 1 |
| Kolubara | 2014-15 | 15 | 0 | 0 | 0 | 0 | 0 | 15 | 0 |
| Kolubara | Total | 15 | 0 | 0 | 0 | 0 | 0 | 15 | 0 |
| Borac Čačak | 2014-15 | 0 | 0 | 0 | 0 | 0 | 0 | 0 | 0 |
| Borac Čačak | 2015-16 | 8 | 1 | 0 | 0 | 0 | 0 | 8 | 1 |
| Borac Čačak | Total | 8 | 1 | 0 | 0 | 0 | 0 | 8 | 1 |
| Napredak Kruševac | 2015-16 | 1 | 0 | 0 | 0 | 0 | 0 | 1 | 0 |
| Napredak Kruševac | Total | 1 | 0 | 0 | 0 | 0 | 0 | 1 | 0 |
| Career totals | | 231 | 32 | 4 | 0 | 0 | 0 | 235 | 32 |

== Honours ==
Napredak Kruševac

- Serbian First League: 2015–16
