= Marko Memedović =

Serbian footballer (born 1991)

Personal information
- Full name: Marko Memedović
- Date of birth: 18 January 1991 (age 35)
- Place of birth: Kraljevo, SFR Yugoslavia
- Height: 1.77 m (5 ft 10 in)
- Position: Winger

Team information
- Current team: North Shore United
- Number: 7

Youth career
- Bubamara 1991
- Sloga Kraljevo

Senior career*
Years	Team	Apps	(Gls)
2007–2011	Sloga Kraljevo	45	(5)
2011–2013	Sloboda Užice	41	(1)
2013–2014	Metalac Gornji Milanovac	8	(0)
2014	Mornar	15	(3)
2014–2015	Petrovac	11	(0)
2015	Radnik Surdulica	15	(4)
2015–2016	Sloga Petrovac na Mlavi	29	(4)
2016	Mačva Šabac	14	(1)
2017	Radnički Pirot	11	(0)
2017	Sloga Kraljevo	14	(3)
2018	Waiheke United	19	(3)
2019–	North Shore United	30	(16)
- * Club domestic league appearances and goals as of 2 June 2020

Marko Memedović (Serbian Cyrillic: Марко Мемедовић; born 18 January 1991) is a Serbian footballer who currently plays for New Zealand club North Shore United.

== Honours ==
Sloga Kraljevo

- Serbian League West: 2010–11

Radnik Surdulica

- Serbian First League: 2014–15
