= Savo Kovačević =

Serbian footballer

Personal information
- Full name: Savo Kovačević
- Date of birth: 15 August 1988 (age 38)
- Place of birth: Novi Sad, SFR Yugoslavia
- Height: 1.85 m (6 ft 1 in)
- Position: Forward

Youth career
- Vojvodina

Senior career*
Years	Team	Apps	(Gls)
2006–2008	Vojvodina	0	(0)
2006	→ ČSK Čelarevo (loan)	7	(2)
2007–2008	→ Proleter Novi Sad (loan)	40	(9)
2008–2010	Proleter Novi Sad	63	(13)
2011–2012	Sloboda Užice	45	(14)
2013	St. Gallen	0	(0)
2013	St. Gallen II	12	(2)
2014	Spartak Semey	8	(1)
2014–2015	Radnički Kragujevac	8	(0)
2015	Cement Beočin	11	(2)
2016–2017	Favoritner AC	41	(13)
2017	ASV Asparn/Zaya	5	(1)
2018	Sloga Erdevik		
2018	Mladost Bački Jarak		
2019-2020	1. FC Südring Aschaffenburg	20	(5)
2020-	Mladost Bački Jarak		
- * Club domestic league appearances and goals as of 20 January 2019

Savo Kovačević (Serbian Cyrillic: Саво Ковачевић; born 15 August 1988) is a Serbian professional footballer who plays as a forward.

While playing for Sloboda Užice, Kovačević was the third-highest scorer in the 2011–12 Serbian SuperLiga with 12 goals. He also played professionally in Switzerland, Kazakhstan, and Austria, respectively.
