= Aleksandar Ćovin =

Serbian footballer

Personal information
- Full name: Aleksandar Ćovin
- Date of birth: 23 November 1988 (age 37)
- Place of birth: Subotica, SFR Yugoslavia
- Height: 1.87 m (6 ft 2 in)
- Position: Midfielder

Senior career*
Years	Team	Apps	(Gls)
2006–2009	Hajduk Kula		
2009–2010	Radnički Sombor	21	(2)
2010–2011	Bačka Topola		
2011–2012	Hajduk Kula	33	(3)
2013	Slavia Mozyr	11	(0)
2014	Sloboda Užice	12	(1)
2014	Proleter Novi Sad	10	(1)
2015	Mladost Velika Obarska	5	(0)
2015–2016	OFK Odžaci	34	(8)
- * Club domestic league appearances and goals as of 23 December 2016

Aleksandar Ćovin (Serbian Cyrillic: Александар Ћовин; born 23 November 1988) is a Serbian retired footballer.
