= Milan Antonijević =

Serbian lawyer and humans rights activist

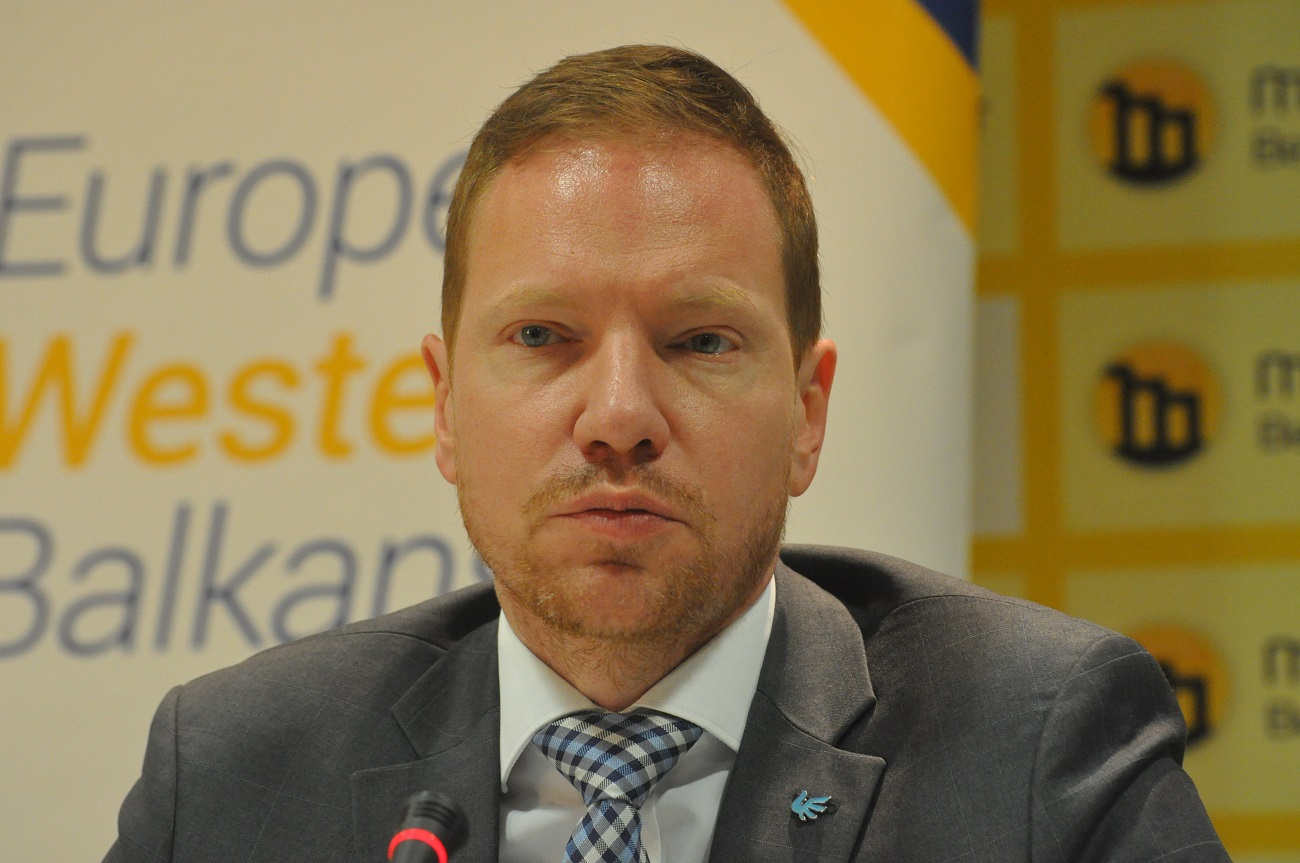
- Born: Милан Антонијевић; 24 September 1975 (age 51); Belgrade, SFR Yugoslavia

Academic background
- Education: University of Bradford; University of Belgrade Faculty of Law

Academic work
- Institutions: Open Society Foundations Serbia; National Convent on the European Union
- Main interests: European integration of Serbia; Human Rights; Minority rights Social rights International humanitarian law

Milan Antonijevic (Serbian: Милан Антонијевић; Belgrade, SFR Yugoslavia; 24 September 1975) is a Serbian lawyer. After a career as human rights activist, and as of 2019, executive director of the Open Society Foundation Serbia, he distanced himself from the human rights movement as off 2020. In December 2025 he was appointed Commissioner for the Protection of Equality on the recommendation of ruling party SNS. Civil society has announced a boycott of the institution because of Antonijević' appointment.

== Life and career ==
Milan Antonijević was born on 24 September 1975 in Belgrade, Serbia, Yugoslavia. He graduated from the Third Belgrade Gymnasium and the University of Belgrade Faculty of Law, Department of International Law. From 1997 to 2000 he worked as a lawyer and in 1999 he graduated from the Human Rights School of the Belgrade Center for Human Rights.

Since 2001, Antonijević has worked as an associate on The Lawyers’ Committee For Human Rights (YUCOM); since 2005 he has been executive director and in 2010 he became director of the committee. During his time at YUCOM, as a member of a team of lawyers and jurists, he represented people whose human rights were endangered before the Serbian and international courts.

Antonijević was a 2006 trainer in Amman, training representatives of Iraqi civil society on constitutional reform advocacy. In the same year, he followed the referendum on the independence of Montenegro as an observer of the Montenegrin Helsinki Committee. He worked on a number of laws in the field of education and social protection, which were adopted in 2009 and 2010, as well as in drafting amendments to the Criminal Code of the Republic of Serbia, whose provisions were adopted in 2012. Antonijević received a Chevening Scholarship from the UK Government in 2009 and completed a major in Conflict Prevention and Using Democracy for Peace at the University of Bradford.

Antonijević is the founder of the Human Rights House in Belgrade in 2011. During his career, he worked as a consultant to the United Nations, Organization for Security and Co-operation in Europe and other international organizations, and was a consultant to the Government of Serbia's Poverty Reduction Team. He also contributed to the writing of reports on human rights of domestic and international organizations, reports on Serbia's progress in the European integration process and the UN Universal Periodic Review. He was also a Serbian candidate for membership of the United Nations Committee against Torture. Antonijević participated in the National Preventive Mechanism (NPM) set up by the Ombudsman of Serbia in 2011 and made visits, wrote reports and made recommendations.

Between 2014 and 2018, Antonijević was an independent member of the Council for Monitoring the Implementation of the Action Plan for the Implementation of the Strategy of Prevention and Protection against Discrimination from 2014 to 2018. On 1 December 2018, he was named Executive Director of the Open Society Foundation Serbia. He initiated the meeting between the Serbian authorities and the opposition at the Faculty of Political Science in Belgrade, which began in August 2019.

Antonijević is a member of the Serbian Council for Monitoring the Implementation of the Recommendations of the UN Human Rights Mechanism and of the National Convent on the European Union in Serbia, where he has been active since 2015 in Chapters 23 as Coordinator, and 24 in Serbia's EU membership negotiations. He is also a fellow to the Salzburg Global Seminar.

On 1 April 2024, he appeared on the Serbian talk show program Kec na jedanaest where he discussed the ongoing dialogues between Serbia and the EU. He shared his view that "the dialogue in Serbia has sunk" in 2010.

On November 12, 2025 it became public he is candidate for Commissioner for the Protection of Equality. Since, Serbian civil society has announced a boycot of the Commissioner's office if Antonijević gets appointed. This follows a reported change from human rights lawyer to Vučić-regime apologist, starting in 2020. The appointment as Commissioner was confirmed by Serbian parliament on December 3, 2025. Serbian diaspora organisations had warned against this appointment and spoke out against it.

== Private life ==
Antonijević is fluent in English and French, and also using Hungarian.

== Selected bibliography ==
Milan Antonijević is the editor and author of more than 80 papers and articles in professional journals on human and minority rights. Some of his works are:

- Antonijević, Milan; Filipović, Milan; Janković Jovanović, Ana (2016). Pristup pravdi : pružanje informacija, saveta i besplatne pravne pomoći u Srbiji. Beograd: Komitet pravnika za ljudska prava YUCOM.
- Antonijević, Milan; Vasić, Milena; Ćurčić, Danilo; Golubović, Katarina (2015). Dani posle : priručnik o vanrednoj situaciji u slučaju poplava - pravna pitanja. Beograd: Komitet pravnika za ljudska prava YUCOM.
- Antonijević, Milan [priredio] (2015). Diskriminacija? : Ne u mojoj školi! : Jedna škola za sve! : priručnik za srednjoškolce i njihove roditelje. Beograd: Komitet pravnika za ljudska prava YUCOM. ISBN 978-86-83209-60-6.
- Antonijević, Milan [priredio] (2015). Borba protiv diskriminacije u obrazovnom sistemu : priručnik za nastavnike i stručne saradnike. Beograd: Komitet pravnika za ljudska prava YUCOM. ISBN 978-86-83209-59-0.
- Antonijević, Milan [priredio] (2014). Studija o položaju izbeglih lica iz Republike Hrvatske : [IPA projekat Naglašavanje ljudskih prava u područjima od posebnog državnog interesa u Hrvatskoj. Beograd: Komitet pravnika za ljudska prava YUCOM.
- Antonijević, Milan; Vuković, Danilo; Golubović, Katarina; Vujić, Kristina (2013). Pristup pravdi i besplatna pravna pomoć u Srbiji : izazovi i reforme. Beograd: YUCOM i SeConS.
- Antonijević, Milan [priredio] (2013). Ustav Republike Srbije : sedam godina pravne neizvesnosti i pet prioriteta za promenu. Beograd: Komitet pravnika za ljudska prava YUCOM. ISBN 978-86-83209-51-4.
- Antonijević, Milan [priredio] (2014). Jačanje pravosuđa u borbi protiv korupcije. Beograd: Komitet pravnika za ljudska prava YUCOM. ISBN 978-86-83209-56-9.<
- Antonijević, Milan [priredio] (2012). Borba protiv diskriminacije u obrazovnom sistemu : priručnik za prosvetne inspektore i prosvetne savetnike. Beograd: Komitet za ljudska prava YUCOM. ISBN 978-86-83209-39-2.
- Antonijević, Milan [priredio] (2012). Uputstvo za usklađivanje propisa sa međunarodnim standardima u oblasti ljudskih prava i vladavine prava. Beograd: Komitet pravnika za ljudska prava YUCOM. ISBN 978-86-83209-35-4.
