= FK Sevojno =

Serbian football club

Sevojno
- Full name: Fudbalski klub Sevojno
- Nickname: Jarčevi (The Billy Goats)
- Founded: 1950; 76 years ago 2010; 16 years ago (refounded)
- Ground: Stadion kraj Valjaonice
- Capacity: 1,460
- President: Nedeljko Milosavljević
- League: Drina Zone League
- 2025–26: Drina Zone League, 5th of 12
Home colours	Away colours

FK Sevojno (Serbian Cyrillic: ФК Севојно) is a football club based in Sevojno, Užice, Serbia. They compete in the Drina Zone League, the fourth tier of the national league system.

== History ==
The beginnings of the club coincided with the construction of a local copper rolling mill, which broke ground in May 1950. The workers played their first friendly game against Sloboda Užice on 25 June, winning 1–0. The official club was formed on 7 July 1951 as FK Radnički. The first game took place on 2 August, a 3–2 loss to Borac Čačak. In 1961, the club became known as FK Sevojno.

The club enjoyed most success during the 2000s under the managerial reign of Ljubiša Stamenković over two spells. They finished as runners-up of the Serbian League West for the second consecutive time in 2004–05, earning a spot in the promotion play-offs. The club subsequently defeated Železničar Niš and Radnički Obrenovac to qualify for the Serbian First League, reaching the second tier for the first time in history. They placed eight in their debut appearance.

After narrowly avoiding relegation in 2007–08, the club brought back Stamenković as manager and went on to finish as runners-up in the 2008–09 Serbian Cup. They managed to upset Red Star Belgrade in the semi-final, but eventually lost 3–0 to Partizan in the final. As a result, the club automatically earned a spot in the 2009–10 UEFA Europa League, gaining the license despite competing in the second tier of Serbian football. They would eliminate Lithuanian side Kaunas on the away goals rule in the second qualifying round. However, the club exited the competition in the next round, losing 4–0 on aggregate to Lille. They also finished the season as runners-up in the Serbian First League and gained promotion to the Serbian SuperLiga. After years of speculation, the club officially merged with Sloboda Užice on 30 June 2010.

== Honours ==
Zlatibor District League (Tier 5)

- 2010–11, 2015–16

== Recent league history ==
Season	Division	P	W	D	L	F	A	Pts	Pos
2020–21	Serbian League Vojvodina	38	12	5	21	48	73	41	15th
2021–22	Vojvodina League North	30	17	6	7	69	43	57	2nd
2022–23	Vojvodina League North	30	13	3	14	63	48	42	7th
2023–24	Vojvodina League North	30	13	4	13	49	54	43	9th
2024–25	Vojvodina League North	30	7	7	16	32	45	28	14th

== European record ==
Season	Competition	Round	Opponent	Score	Aggregate
2009–10	Europa League	Second qualifying round	(Lithuania) Kaunas	0–0 (H), 1–1 (A)	1–1
2009–10	Europa League	Third qualifying round	(France) Lille	0–2 (H), 0–2 (A)	0–4

== Notable players ==
This is a list of players who have played at full international level.

- (Armenia) Ognjen Čančarević
- (El Salvador) Vladan Vićević
- (Serbia) Bojan Isailović
- (Serbia) Nikola Maksimović
- (Serbia and Montenegro) Radivoje Manić

For a list of all FK Sevojno players with a Wikipedia article, see Category:FK Sevojno players.

== Historical list of coaches ==
- (Serbia and Montenegro) Timotije Davidović (2002–2003)
- (El Salvador) Vladan Vićević (2003)
- (Serbia and Montenegro) Ljubiša Stamenković (2003–2006)
- (Serbia) Dušan Arsenijević (2006–2007)
- (Serbia) Nenad Markićević (2007–2008)
- (Serbia) Ljubiša Stamenković (2008–2010)
- (Serbia) Nemanja Blagojević (Apr 2019 – Sep 2020)
- (Serbia) Nenad Đoković (2020–2022)
- (Serbia) Bojan Brajković (2022 - Mar 2024)
- (Serbia) Vladan Vicević (Mar 2024 - Oct 2025)
- (Serbia) Nenad Popović (Oct 2025-)
