= List of FK Vojvodina managers =

FK Vojvodina is a professional football club based in Novi Sad, Vojvodina, Serbia.

== Managers ==
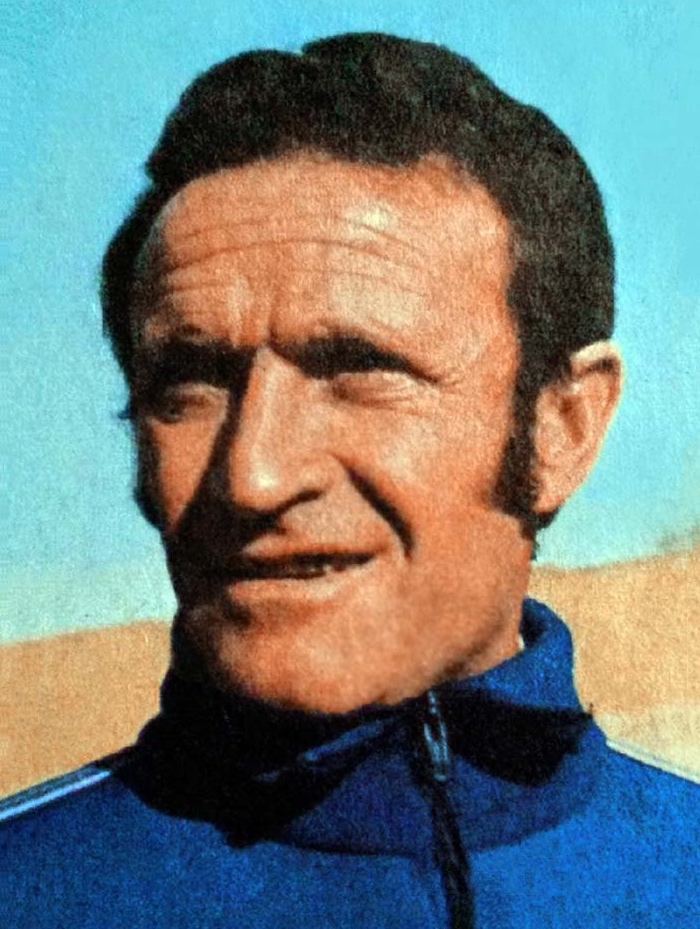
Zdravko Rajkov

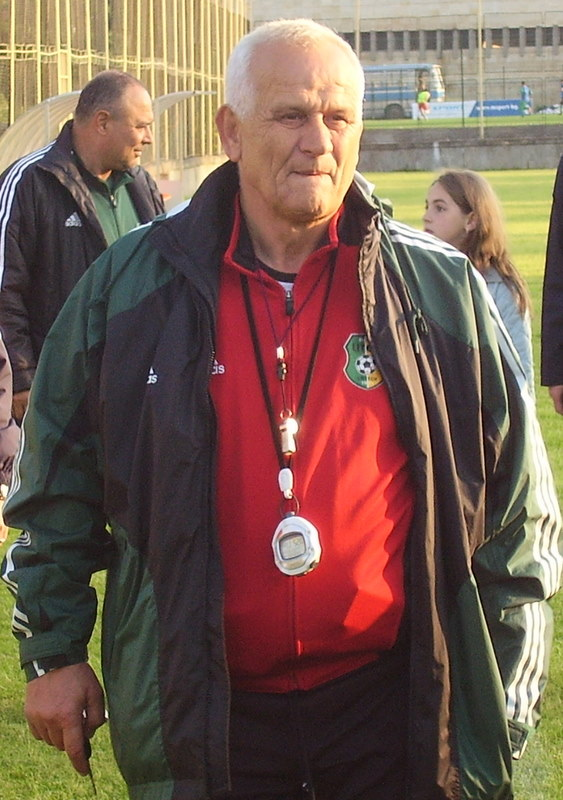
Ljupko Petrović

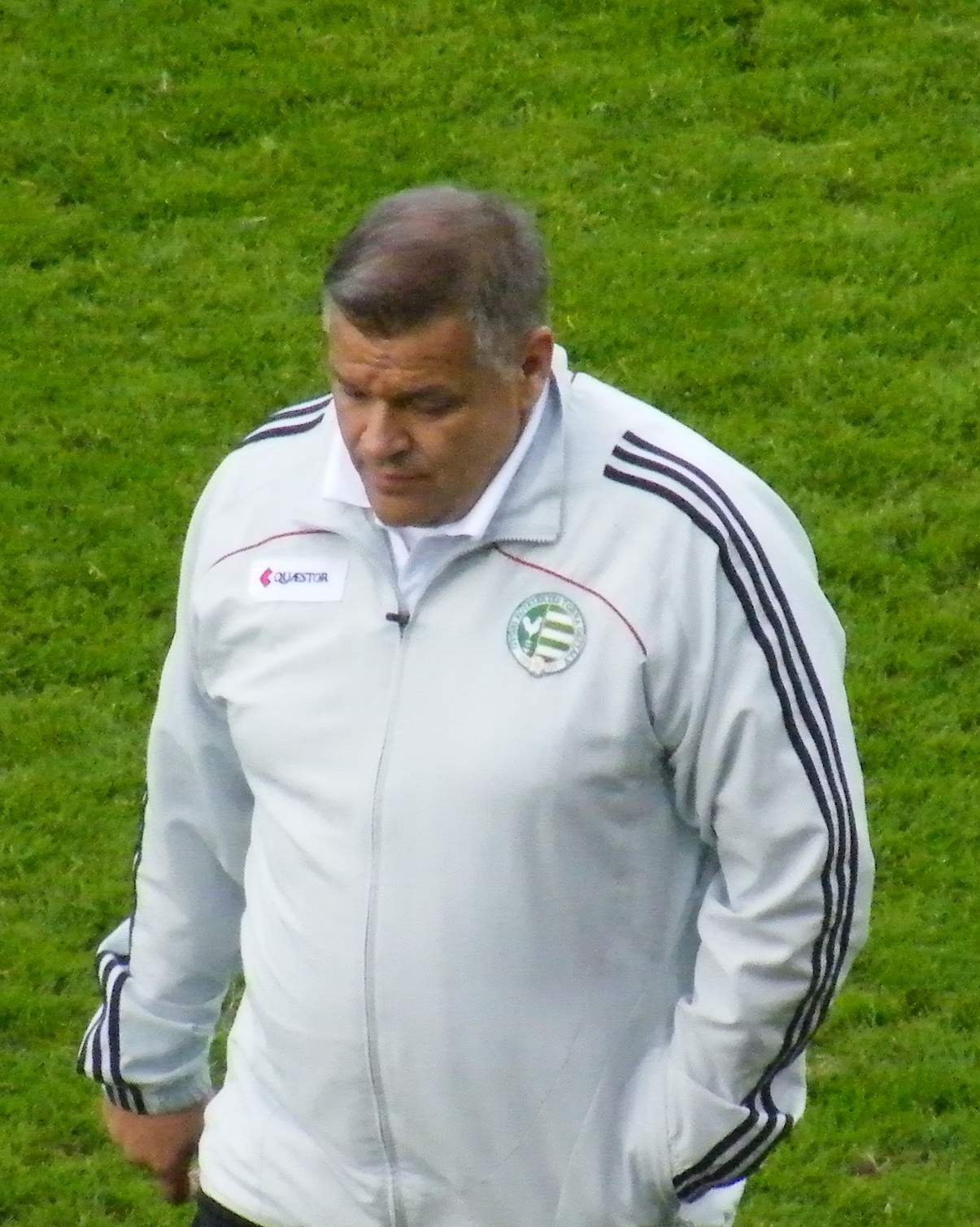
Dragoljub Bekvalac

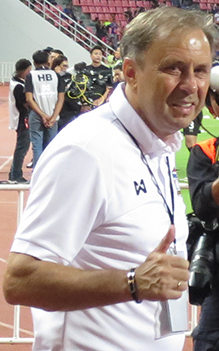
Milovan Rajevac

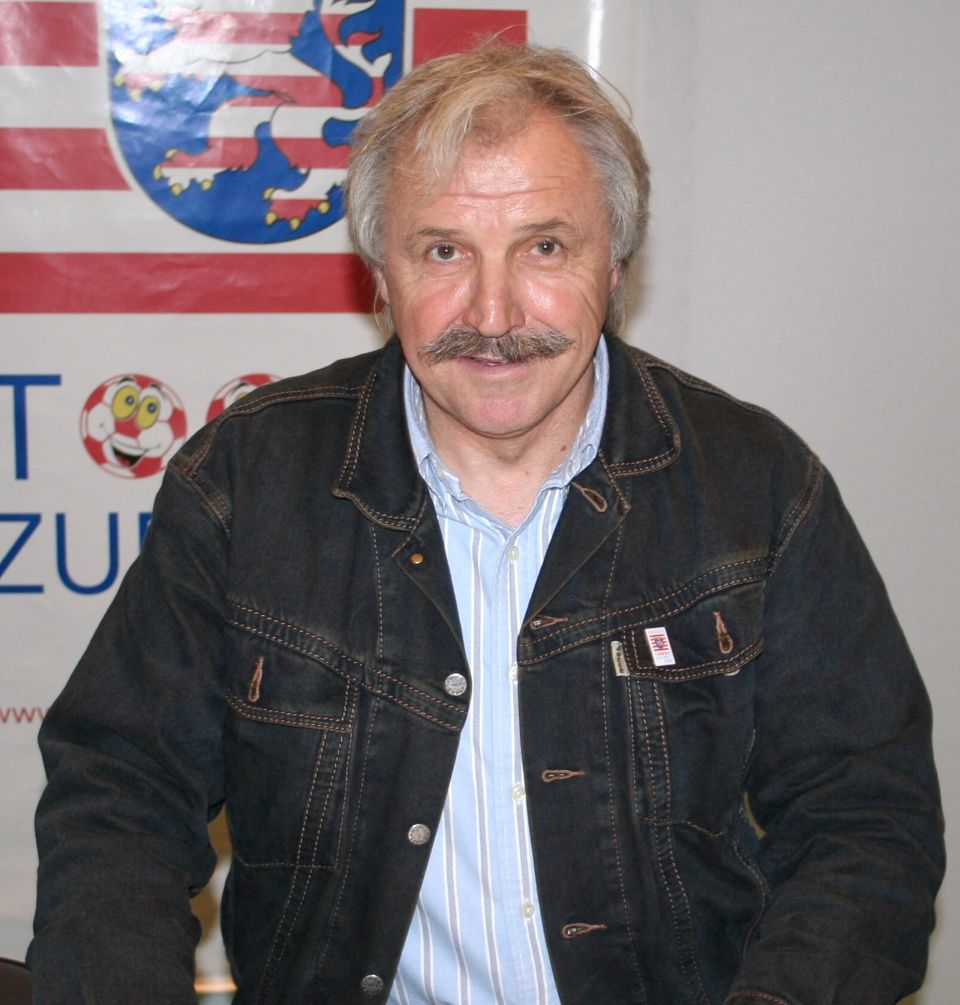
Dragoslav Stepanović

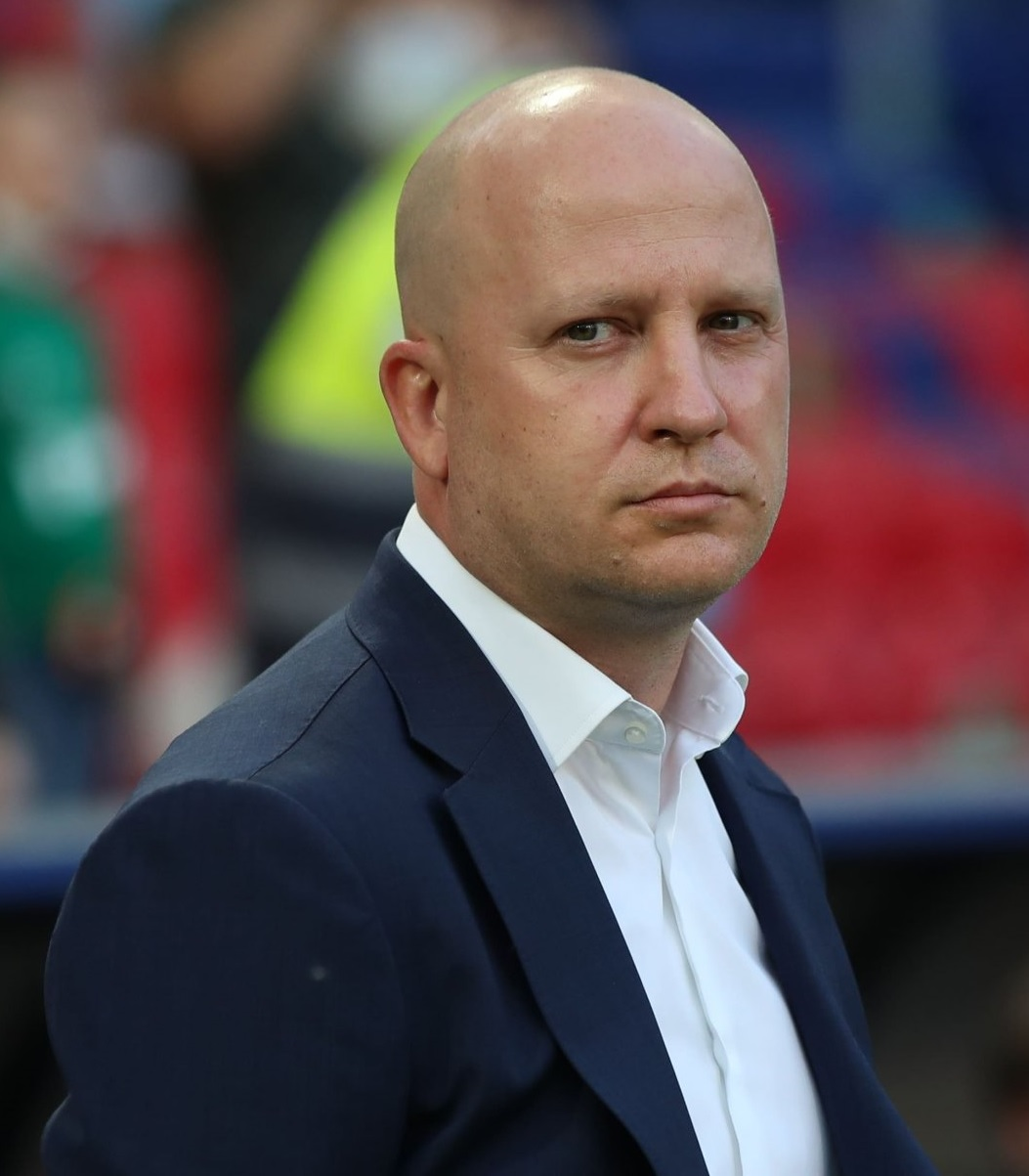
Marko Nikolić

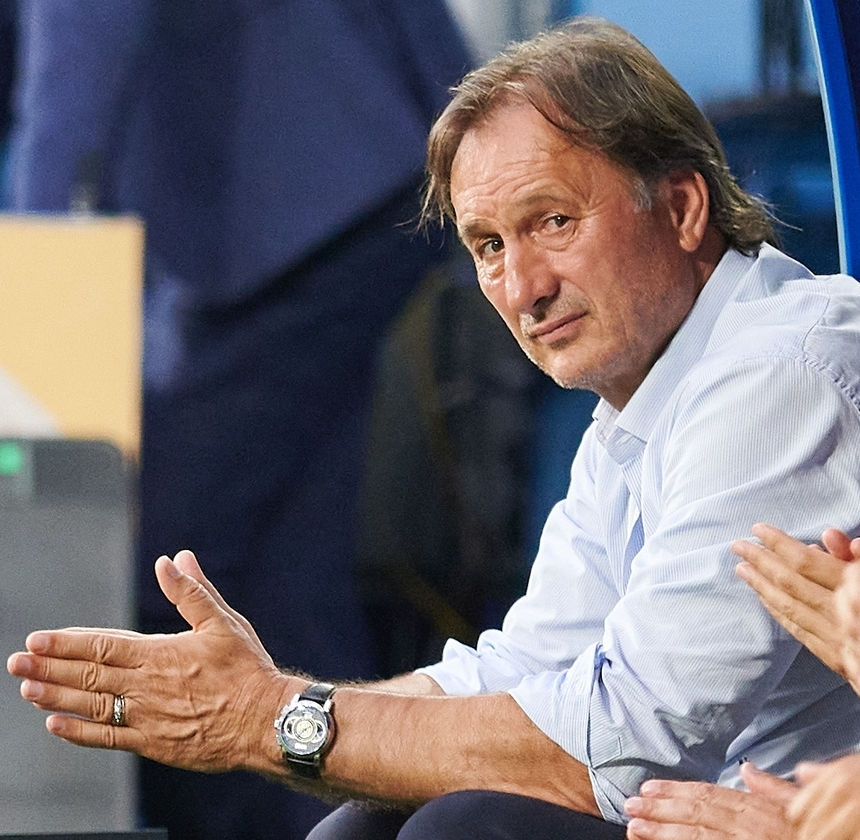
Miroslav Tanjga

Name	Period		Pld	W	D	L	Win %	Honours
Name	From	To	Pld	W	D	L	Win %	Honours
(Austria) Otto Neczas	1926							
(Hungary) Károly Nemes								
(Austria) Otto Neczas		1930						
(Austria) Otto Hamacek	1930							
(Hungary) Károly Nemes	1932							
(Austria) Willi Schürmann								
(Hungary) Károly Nemes	1935							
(Austria) Fritz Levitus	September 1936	1938						
(Socialist Federal Republic of Yugoslavia) Milorad Ognjanov	1938							
(Hungary) Károly Nemes	January 1940	November 1940						
(Hungary) János Neu	1941							
(Socialist Federal Republic of Yugoslavia) Milorad Ognjanov								
(Socialist Federal Republic of Yugoslavia) Branislav Sekulić								
(Socialist Federal Republic of Yugoslavia) Ljubiša Broćić								
(Socialist Federal Republic of Yugoslavia) Milorad Ognjanov								
(Socialist Federal Republic of Yugoslavia) Gustav Lechner	1953	1957						
(Hungary) Antal Lyka	1957	1959						Mitropa Cup runners-up: 1957
(Socialist Federal Republic of Yugoslavia) Ratomir Čabrić	1959	1960						
(Socialist Federal Republic of Yugoslavia) Radoslav Momirski	1960	1961						
(Socialist Federal Republic of Yugoslavia) Franja Hirman	1961	1964						
(Socialist Federal Republic of Yugoslavia) Branko Stanković	1964	1967						Yugoslav First League champions: 1965–66
(Socialist Federal Republic of Yugoslavia) Zdravko Rajkov	1967	1968						
(Socialist Federal Republic of Yugoslavia) Ratomir Čabrić	1968	1970						
(Socialist Federal Republic of Yugoslavia) Dragoljub Milošević	1970	1973						
(Socialist Federal Republic of Yugoslavia) Gojko Zec	1973	May 1974						
(Socialist Federal Republic of Yugoslavia) Todor Veselinović	May 1974	June 1977						Mitropa Cup winners: 1976–77
(Socialist Federal Republic of Yugoslavia) Branko Stanković	1977	1978						
(Socialist Federal Republic of Yugoslavia) Ivica Brzić	1978	1979						
(Socialist Federal Republic of Yugoslavia) Milorad Pavić	July 1979	December 1979						
(Socialist Federal Republic of Yugoslavia) Marko Valok	January 1980	December 1980						
(Socialist Federal Republic of Yugoslavia) Dušan Drašković	January 1981	April 1983						
(Socialist Federal Republic of Yugoslavia) Tomislav Kaloperović	April 1983	1983						
(Socialist Federal Republic of Yugoslavia) Josip Duvančić	June 1983	1984						
(Socialist Federal Republic of Yugoslavia) Jovan Kovrlija	1984	1984						
(Socialist Federal Republic of Yugoslavia) Vukašin Višnjevac	December 1984	1985						
(Socialist Federal Republic of Yugoslavia) Tomislav Kaloperović	1985	January 1986						
(Socialist Federal Republic of Yugoslavia) Vladimir Savić	1986	1986						
(Socialist Federal Republic of Yugoslavia) Tonko Vukušić	1986	1987						Yugoslav Second League champions: 1986–87 (Group West)
(Socialist Federal Republic of Yugoslavia) Ivica Brzić	1987	1988						
(Socialist Federal Republic of Yugoslavia) Ljupko Petrović	1988	November 1989						Yugoslav First League champions: 1988–89
(Socialist Federal Republic of Yugoslavia) Jovan Kovrlija (caretaker)	November 1989	December 1989						
(Socialist Federal Republic of Yugoslavia) Ivica Brzić	December 1989	1991						
(Socialist Federal Republic of Yugoslavia) Žarko Nikolić	1991	1991						
(Socialist Federal Republic of Yugoslavia) Jovan Kovrlija	1991	1992						
(Federal Republic of Yugoslavia) Milorad Kosanović		1995						
(North Macedonia) Đoko Hadžievski	1995	1996						
(Federal Republic of Yugoslavia) Dragoljub Bekvalac	1996							
(Federal Republic of Yugoslavia) Ljupko Petrović		October 1997						FR Yugoslavia Cup runners-up: 1996–97
(Federal Republic of Yugoslavia) Josip Pirmajer	1997	1998						
(Federal Republic of Yugoslavia) Tomislav Manojlović	1998	February 2000						UEFA Intertoto Cup runners-up: 1998
(Federal Republic of Yugoslavia) Dragoljub Bekvalac	February 2000	May 2000						
(Federal Republic of Yugoslavia) Dragan Okuka	June 2000	November 2000	17	6	3	8	35.29	
(Federal Republic of Yugoslavia) Dragoljub Bekvalac	December 2000	September 2001	22	8	8	6	36.36	
(Federal Republic of Yugoslavia) Branislav Novaković (caretaker)	September 2001	September 2001						
(Federal Republic of Yugoslavia) Slobodan Pavković	September 2001	March 2002						
(Federal Republic of Yugoslavia) Milan Popović (caretaker)	March 2002	March 2002						
(Federal Republic of Yugoslavia) Čedomir Đoinčević	March 2002	December 2002						
(Federal Republic of Yugoslavia) Miroslav Vukašinović	December 2002	September 2003						
(Serbia and Montenegro) Josif Ilić	September 2003	January 2004						
(Serbia and Montenegro) Branko Smiljanić	January 2004	November 2004	29	11	9	9	37.93	
(Serbia and Montenegro) Miroslav Ćurčić (caretaker)	November 2004	December 2004	3	1	0	2	33.33	
(Serbia and Montenegro) Vladimir Petrović	December 2004	December 2004	0	0	0	0	—	
(Serbia and Montenegro) Milan Đuričić	December 2004	August 2005	17	5	4	8	29.41	
(Serbia and Montenegro) Zoran Marić	August 2005	August 2006	31	11	10	10	35.48	
(Serbia) Milovan Rajevac	August 2006	September 2007	44	24	8	12	54.55	Serbian Cup runners-up: 2006–07
(Serbia) Ivica Brzić	September 2007	May 2008	29	16	6	7	55.17	
(Serbia) Dragoljub Bekvalac	June 2008	October 2008	13	7	2	4	53.85	
(Montenegro) Dragan Radojičić (caretaker)	October 2008	December 2008	10	6	2	2	60.00	
(Serbia) Ljupko Petrović	December 2008	March 2009	2	0	1	1	0.00	
(Serbia) Zoran Marić	March 2009	May 2009	14	7	5	2	50.00	
(Serbia) Dragoslav Stepanović	June 2009	October 2009	9	4	2	3	44.44	
(Bulgaria) Zlatomir Zagorčić (caretaker)	October 2009	October 2009	1	1	0	0	100.00	
(Serbia) Branko Babić	October 2009	March 2010	12	6	2	4	50.00	
(Serbia) Milan Đuričić	March 2010	May 2010	15	6	3	6	40.00	Serbian Cup runners-up: 2009–10
(Serbia) Zoran Milinković	May 2010	May 2011	36	24	8	4	66.67	Serbian Cup runners-up: 2010–11
(Serbia) Ljubomir Ristovski	June 2011	August 2011	3	1	1	1	33.33	
(Montenegro) Dejan Vukićević	August 2011	April 2012	27	13	9	5	48.15	
(Serbia) Spasoje Jelačić (caretaker)	April 2012	April 2012	2	1	0	1	50.00	
(Bulgaria) Zlatomir Zagorčić (Note: Zagorčić initially served as a caretaker manager before being appointed on a permanent basis in June 2012.)	April 2012	September 2012	13	8	3	2	61.54	
(Serbia) Nebojša Vignjević	September 2012	June 2013	32	17	11	4	53.13	Serbian Cup runners-up: 2012–13
(Serbia) Marko Nikolić	June 2013	December 2013	26	12	10	4	46.15	
(Serbia) Branko Babić	January 2014	May 2014	16	7	5	4	43.75	Serbian Cup winners: 2013–14
(Serbia) Milan Kosanović (caretaker)	May 2014	May 2014	2	1	1	0	50.00	
(Serbia) Zoran Marić	June 2014	March 2015	24	13	3	8	54.17	
(Bulgaria) Zlatomir Zagorčić	March 2015	October 2015	33	15	5	13	45.45	
(Serbia) Goran Šaula (caretaker)	October 2015	November 2015	4	0	3	1	0.00	
(Serbia) Nenad Lalatović	November 2015	December 2016	53	30	15	8	56.60	
(Serbia) Dragan Ivanović	December 2016	April 2017	7	4	0	3	57.14	
(Serbia) Aleksandar Veselinović	April 2017	April 2017	4	2	2	0	50.00	
(Serbia) Vladimir Buač (caretaker)	April 2017	April 2017	1	0	0	1	0.00	
(Montenegro) Radoslav Batak	April 2017	June 2017	8	4	2	2	50.00	
(Serbia) Nenad Vanić	June 2017	September 2017	8	5	0	3	62.50	
(Serbia) Vladimir Buač	September 2017	November 2017	14	6	4	4	42.86	
(Serbia) Zoran Vasiljević (caretaker)	December 2017	December 2017	3	0	2	1	0.00	
(Serbia) Ilija Stolica	December 2017	April 2018	8	2	2	4	25.00	
(Serbia) Zoran Vasiljević (caretaker)	April 2018	April 2018	1	1	0	0	100.00	
(Serbia) Aleksandar Veselinović	April 2018	September 2018	14	4	3	7	28.57	
(Serbia) Dragan Okuka	September 2018	November 2018	12	6	1	5	50.00	
(Serbia) Radovan Krivokapić (Note: Krivokapić initially served as a caretaker manager before being appointed on a permanent basis in January 2019.)	November 2018	May 2019	21	4	7	10	19.05	
(Serbia) Nenad Lalatović	June 2019	May 2021	78	46	15	17	58.97	Serbian Cup winners: 2019–20
(Serbia) Slavoljub Đorđević	May 2021	March 2022	33	13	7	13	39.39	
(Montenegro) Dragan Radojičić	March 2022	May 2022	12	4	0	8	33.33	
(Serbia) Milan Rastavac	June 2022	February 2023	25	11	10	4	44.00	
(Montenegro) Radoslav Batak	February 2023	August 2023	20	7	6	7	35.00	
(Serbia) Ranko Popović	August 2023	December 2023	19	10	4	5	52.63	
(Montenegro) Božidar Bandović	December 2023	August 2024	30	12	8	10	40.00	Serbian Cup runners-up: 2023–24
(Serbia) Nemanja Krtolica (caretaker)	August 2024	October 2024	6	3	2	1	50.00	
(Serbia) Nenad Lalatović	October 2024	March 2025	17	7	6	4	41.18	
(Serbia) Miroslav Tanjga	March 2025	July 2026	60	34	11	15	56.67	Serbian Cup runners-up: 2024–25, 2025–26
(Serbia) Predrag Kandić (caretaker)	July 2026	July 2026	1	0	0	1	0.00	
(Serbia) Marko Savić	July 2026							
