= SD Vojvodina =

Multi-sport club in Novi Sad, Serbia

- Full name: Sportsko društvo Vojvodina; Спортско друштво Војводина
- Nicknames: Voša; Lale; Crveno-beli
- Founded: 1914; 112 years ago
- Based in: Novi Sad
- Colors: Red and White
- President: Dušan Bajatović
- Official fan club: Firma (The Firm)

Sportsko društvo Vojvodina (Serbian Cyrillic: Спортско друштво Војводина, lit. 'Vojvodina Sports Society'), commonly abbreviated as SD Vojvodina (Serbian Cyrillic: СД Војводина), formed in 1914, is a multi-sport club based in Novi Sad, Serbia.

== Clubs ==
=== Basketball ===
==== Women's ====
National Championships – 2

- Yugoslav Women's Basketball League:
  - Winners (2) : 1969, 1970
  - Runners-up (2) : 1972, 1992
- First Women's Basketball League of Serbia:
  - Runners-up (4) : 2004, 2005, 2006, 2015

National Cups – 2

- Yugoslav Women's Basketball Cup:
  - Runners-up (2) : 1972
- Milan Ciga Vasojević Cup:
  - Winners (2) : 2001, 2015
  - Runners-up (6) : 1995, 1998, 1999, 2005, 2006, 2007

International titles – 0

- Adriatic League Women:
  - Runners-up (1) : 2006

=== Football ===
==== Men's ====
Honours National Championships - 2

- Yugoslavian First League
  - Winners (2): 1966, 1989
  - Runners-up (3): 1957, 1962, 1975
  - Third place(1): 1992
- Serbia and Montenegro First League
  - Third place(5): 1993, 1994, 1995, 1996, 1997
- Serbian SuperLiga
  - Runners-up (1): 2009
  - Third place(5): 2007, 2008, 2011, 2012, 2013

National Cups

- Yugoslav Cup
  - Runners-up (1): 1951
- Serbia and Montenegro Cup
  - Runners-up (1): 1997
- Serbian Cup
  - Winners (2): 2014, 2020
  - Runners-up (4): 2007, 2010, 2011, 2013

International

- European Cup/UEFA Champions League
  - 1/4 Finalists (1): 1967
- Inter-Cities Fairs Cup/UEFA Cup/UEFA Europa League
  - 1/4 Finalists (2): 1962, 1968
- Mitropa Cup
  - Winners (1): 1977
  - Runners-up (1): 1957
- UEFA Intertoto Cup
  - Winners (1): 1976
  - Runners-up (1): 1998

=== Handball ===
==== Men's ====
Honours

- National League

Winners (12): 2005, 2013, 2014, 2015, 2016, 2017, 2018, 2019, 2021, 2022, 2023, 2024

- National Cup

Winners (8): 2005, 2006, 2011, 2015, 2019, 2020, 2021, 2023

- National Super Cup

Winners (8): 2013, 2014, 2015, 2016, 2018, 2019, 2023, 2024

- EHF European Cup
  - Winners (1): 2022/23

=== Ice hockey club ===
Honours

- Serbian Hockey League:
  - Winners (8) : 1998, 1999, 2000, 2001, 2002, 2003, 2004, 2022
- Serbian Ice Hockey Cup
  - Winners (3): 1999, 2000, 2001
- Panonian League:
  - Winners (1) : 2009

=== Volleyball ===
==== Men's ====
Honours National Championships - 19

- Champion of Yugoslavia (2):
  - 1987-88, 1988–89
- Champion of Serbia and Montenegro (10):
  - 1991-92, 1992–93, 1993–94, 1994–95, 1995–96, 1996–97, 1997–98, 1998–99, 1999-00, 2003–04
- Champion of Serbia (7):
  - 2006-07, 2016-17, 2017-18, 2018-19, 2019-20, 2020-21, 2021-22

National Cups - 16

- Yugoslav Cup (2):
  - 1976-77, 1986–87
- Serbia and Montenegro Cup (8):
  - 1992-93, 1994–95, 1995–96, 1996–97, 1998–99, 2003–04, 2004–05, 2005-06
- Serbian cup (6):
  - 2006-07, 2009–10, 2011–12, 2014-15, 2019-20, 2023-24

National Super Cup- 6

- Serbia and Montenegro Super cup (1):
  - 1993
- Serbian Super cup (5):
  - 2015, 2019, 2020, 2021, 2023

International

- CEV Champions League:
  - Semi finalist (2): 1988/89, 1995/96
- CEV Cup:
  - Semi finalist (2): 1982/83, 2005/06
- CEV Challenge Cup:
  - Winners (1): 2014/15

=== Water polo ===
==== Men's ====
- Serbian League
  - Runners-up (3): 2009, 2010, 2011
- Serbian Cup
  - Runners-up (3): 2009, 2010, 2011

==== Women's ====
- Serbian League
  - Winners (4): 2021, 2022, 2023, 2024
- Serbian Cup
  - Winners (5): 2020, 2021, 2022, 2023, 2024
