= FC Vujadin Boškov =

Training facility of FK Vojvodina in Veternik, Serbia

- Location: Veternik, Serbia
- Owner: FK Vojvodina
- Type: Football training ground
- Events: FK Vojvodina; FK Vojvodina youth teams

Construction
- Opened: 1970s
- Renovated: 2006 (completely renovated)
- Expanded: 2009
- Cost: € 2 million (2006 Renovation)

Website
- FC Vujadin Boškov (in Serbian)

Fudbalski Centar Vujadin Boškov is the training facility of Serbian professional football club FK Vojvodina. The sports complex was named after Vujadin Boškov, a former player and successful trainer of FK Vojvodina.

== History ==
In the early 1970s, on the edge of Novi Sad and the road to Veternik, a sport and training center was built to be the home of the football club FK Vojvodina.

In 2006, the club reconstructed the complex along with the stadium. In 2009 the training facility was expanded.

== Facilities ==
The center has 85,000 m^{2} of sports facilities and 2,000 m^{2} of enclosed space. It hosts six courts. One court offers artificial grass. Bleachers surround two courts, and the main court allows matches and training at night.

The main building houses two press centers for interviews.

The center is one of the most modern training camps in southeastern Europe in terms of functionality, architectural solutions, modern equipment, and building materials used.

== Notables ==
FK Vojvodina has developed renowned professional footballers such as Miloš Krasić, Gojko Kačar, Milan Stepanov, Srđan Bajčetić (retired), Dušan Tadić, Željko Brkić, Danijel Aleksić, Slobodan Medojević, Aleksandar Katai, Goran Šaula, Damir Stojak and former Barnsley player Jovo Bosančić.
