= Zoran Mijucić =

Serbian footballer

Personal information
- Full name: Zoran Mijucić
- Date of birth: 23 December 1968
- Place of birth: Šid, SFR Yugoslavia
- Date of death: 3 October 2009 (aged 40)
- Place of death: Novi Sad, Serbia
- Position: Left wing

Youth career
- Radnički Šid

Senior career*
Years	Team	Apps	(Gls)
1985–1992	FK Vojvodina	109	(20)
1992 august-september	FK Becej	4	(1)
1992 autumn	Olimpiakos Volos		
1993 spring	RFK Novi Sad	13	(0)
- Cement Beočin

International career
1985–1987	Yugoslavia U20		
Medal record
Representing Yugoslavia
Gold medal – first place	FIFA U-20 World Cup	1987
- * Club domestic league appearances and goals

Zoran Mijucić (Serbian Cyrillic: Зоран Мијуцић; 23 December 1968 – 3 October 2009) was a Serbian footballer.

== Career ==
=== Club career ===
Mijucić was part of the famed Vojvodina squad that won the Yugoslav First League in 1989. Later he played for Cement Beočin.

=== International career ===
Mijucić was a member of the highly talented Yugoslavian under-20 team that won the 1987 FIFA World Youth Championship in Chile, playing five games in the tournament.

== Death and legacy ==
Mijucić died on 3 October 2009 after a lengthy battle with cancer. The Zoran Mijucić Memorial Tournament, created in 2010, is named in his honour.

== Honours ==
Vojvodina

- Yugoslav First League: 1988–89
