= FK Vojvodina =

Association football club in Novi Sad, Serbia

Vojvodina
- Full name: Fudbalski Klub Vojvodina
- Nicknames: Воша / Voša; Лале / Lale (Tulips); Стара дама / Stara dama (The Old Lady); Бело-црвени / Belo-crveni (The White-reds)
- Short name: FKV, VOJ
- Founded: 6 March 1914; 112 years ago
- Ground: Karađorđe Stadium
- Capacity: 14,458
- President: Dragoljub Zbiljić
- Head coach: Marko Savić
- League: Serbian SuperLiga
- 2025–26: Serbian SuperLiga, 2nd of 16
- Website: fkvojvodina.rs
Home colours	Away colours

Fudbalski klub Vojvodina (Serbian Cyrillic: Фудбалски клуб Војводина), commonly known as Vojvodina and colloquially as Voša (Serbian Cyrillic: Воша), is a Serbian professional football club based in Novi Sad, Serbia, the second largest city in Serbia, and one of the most popular clubs in the country. The club is the major part of the Vojvodina multi-sport club and the most successful football club in Serbia next to the rivals Red Star Belgrade and Partizan.

In its long history, Vojvodina were one of the most successful clubs in the former Yugoslavia, winning two First League titles, in 1966 and 1989, were runners-up in 1957, 1962 and 1975, achieved 3rd place in 1992 and finished 5th in the competition's all-time table. Vojvodina were also runners-up in the Yugoslav Cup in 1951. They won the UEFA Intertoto Cup in 1976, the Mitropa Cup in 1977 and were also runners-up of the Mitropa Cup in 1957 and the UEFA Intertoto Cup in 1998. From 1993 to 1997, Vojvodina achieved in the national championship 3rd place five times in a row and were runners-up in the domestic cup in 1997. They were runners-up in the Serbian SuperLiga in 2008–09 Serbian SuperLiga and 3rd place in 2007, 2008, 2011, 2012, 2013, 2017 and 2020. Vojvodina were also runners-up of the Serbian Cup in 2007, 2010, 2011 and 2013. They have won the Serbian Cup twice, winning their first title in 2014 and their second in 2020.

== History ==
On 6 March 1914, in Sava Šijakov's weaving mill in the Temerinska Street 12, a group of students of the Serbian Orthodox high school established with the help of intellectuals and craftsmen a football club in Novi Sad. The club was founded in secrecy, because the former Austro-Hungarian authorities banned larger organized gatherings of juveniles in the Vojvodina region which was inhabited mostly by Serbs. The club took the name Vojvodina, in order to emphasize the memory of the political-territorial unit of the Serbs in the "Serbian Vojvodina" in which the Serbs, at least on paper, get the same rights as all other citizens in the Habsburg Empire for which they have fought for years. The name Vojvodina means in Serbian a type of duchy, more specifically, a voivodeship. It derives from the word "vojvoda", and means "one who leads warriors" or "war leader".

Among the club founders on that day were the future textile industrialist Milenko Šijakov, the future university professor Vladimir Milićević, the future chemists Milenko Hinić, the future lawyers Radenko Rakić and Kamenko Ćirić, Gojko Tosić, Đorđe Živanov, Branko Gospođinački, the future doctor of law Kosta Hadži and others. The new club played its first match in the village of Kovilj against local club FK Šajkaš. Vojvodina played in bright blue colours and white shorts and won by 5–0. Svetozar Jocković, Jovan Ljubojević, Milorad Milićević, Dušan Kovačev, Jovan Jocković, Ozren Stojanović, Sava Ignjačev, Gavanski, Predrag Stojanović Ciga, Živojin Đeremov and Uroš Čakovac entered the record books as the first players in the history of Vojvodina. The players were mainly pupils and students, who came from Prague in the summer holidays and played only that one match, because shortly before World War I broke out. The strict hand of the Austro-Hungarian authorities stopped all Serbian organizations in Novi Sad and Vojvodina was the first time in the situation to be shut down.

Flag of Vojvodina Novi Sad.

After the liberation, Vojvodina resumed the work thanks to the enthusiasm of Serbian students from Prague. The first president of Vojvodina became Milenko Šijakov, son of weaving mill owner Sava Šijak, and the first secretary became Dr. Živko Bajazet, the longtime president of the Serbian merchant bank and member of the Sokol organization. The club financed solely by membership fees and by generous contributions as by Maks Grin, Daka Popović, the Novaković brothers, Ilija Balabušić and the members of Dunđerski family. Part of the Vojvodina players and management who studied in Prague, were also members of football club Slavia Prague. The Czech club supported the Vojvodina members during the difficult times before and during World War I and contributed in the development of the club. In 1920, was brought from Prague the first set of red and white jerseys. At the club meeting held on 23 July 1922, it was decided that in honour of Slavia Prague the red and white colors adorn the jerseys of Vojvodina. The coat of arms was also partially modeled after Slavia Prague's coat of arms, where the red star of the Czech team was replaced with the blue star, so that Vojvodina's coat of arms had all the colors of the Serbian flag. The first coach, technical director and chief organizer of Vojvodina was the lawyer Dr. Kosta Hadži, one of the main founder of Vojvodina and the Novi Sad Football Subassociation. Under his leadership, Vojvodina won the Novi Sad Subassociation league in 1926, which was the first trophy in its history. Vojvodina played with following players: Mihajlović, Živić, Kričkov, Popović, Vajs, Aleksić, Grgarov, Marjanović, Šević, Petrović, Dudás and Saraz. The club provided the first professional contracts to its players, and also brought professional players from abroad such as Czech Josef Čapek and Hungarians Sándor Dudás and Abraham Saraz. One of the best and most influential Vojvodina players at that time was Dušan Marković, an effective striker who played for Vojvodina from 1921 to 1935. End of the 1930s, Vojvodina brought many good players into the team, which was later known as the Millionaires team and one of the best was Jožef Velker, which became to a crucial player of the club. In 1932, 1934, 1935, 1937–1940, Vojvodina won the Novi Sad Football Subassociation league. Since then, Vojvodina begun having serious pretensions to gain promotion to the Yugoslav First League. The club failed to immediately make an impact, but during the season 1940/41, Vojvodina fought for the top. The final stage of the championship was interrupted by the beginning of World War II, and the Axis bombing, mobilization and country's occupation made the continuation of the competition impossible.

In 1962, Vojvodina was runners-up. However, the results deteriorated in the following seasons and Vojvodina even started fighting against relegation. In 1964 everything changed with Vujadin Boškov as the technical director and Branko Stanković as coach. Vujadin Boškov remodeled and modernized the club. The infrastructure was improved and a new sports center was built. It also organized a successful scouting network and the administration, headed by president Arsa Kovačević, was able to provide all necessary conditions for the competition. Coach Branko Stanković changed the style of play and shifted the emphasis on discipline and running. The only player who had a free hand was Silvester Takač, one of the best players of this generation. In 1966, Vojvodina won the Yugoslav first league for the first time with eight points ahead of second placed Dinamo Zagreb. Members of this generation were Silvester Takač, Ilija Pantelić, Žarko Nikolić, Ivica Brzić, Rajko Aleksić, Đorđe Pavlić, Dobrivoje Trivić, Stevan Sekereš, Đorđe Milić and Stevan Nešticki.

In 1989, under the new coach Ljupko Petrović, Vojvodina spent almost the whole championship as league leaders. During the season, Vojvodina won at home against all top four Yugoslav clubs. Partizan Belgrade was defeated by goals by 3–2, Dinamo Zagreb by 4–1, Hajduk Split by 2–0 and finally Red Star by 3–1 in front of more than 27,000 spectators. Vojvodina played the decisive game for the championship against Sloboda Tuzla and needed a win to clinch the title ahead of rival Red Star. Vojvodina won in front of 27.000 spectator by goals from Šestić (twice), Vorkapić and Vujačić with 4–2. The final whistle sparked off a huge celebration inside the stadium as well as a massive celebratory pitch invasion. The second championship trophy was finally won with three points ahead, after 23 years of waiting, by the new generation of players, such as Siniša Mihajlović, Miloš Šestić, Slaviša Jokanović, Budimir Vujačić, Ljubomir Vorkapić, Miroslav Tanjga, Goran Kartalija, Dušan Mijić, Svetozar Šapurić, Čedo Maras, Stevan Milovac, Dragan Punišić and Zoran Mijucić. The following season, Vojvodina fell unhappily in the first round of European Cup against Honvéd Budapest, although most of the key players from the previous league-winning season remained. Losing the first leg by 1–0 at Honvéd was extremely disappointing. During the second leg, things went much better as Vojvodina got up 2–0 by goals from Siniša Mihajlović and Miroslav Tanjga, however a late own goal by defender Dragan Gaćeša dashed Vojvodina hopes of progressing further.

In 1990, Vojvodina failed to defend the previously acquired title and finished the season as 11th. The disintegration of Yugoslavia, the civil war (1992–1995), the inflation and the UN sanctions have hit the Yugoslav football teams hard. The difficult situation forced Vojvodina to sell its best players and the champions team broke up in the early nineties. However, Vojvodina's management, led by Milutin Popivoda, succeeded to assemble a new team. The coaches, mainly Milorad Kosanović, made also a great combination of players from Vojvodina's excellent youth like, Jovo Bosančić, Goran Šaula, Radoslav Samardžić, Goran Ćurko and Srđan Bajčetić, and players from other areas like Aleksandar Kocić, Dejan Govedarica, Goran Jezdimirović, Miodrag Pantelić, Vesko Mihajlović and Zoltan Sabo. From 1992, Vojvodina achieved in the championship always the 3rd place, 6 times in a row, and received the call of the eternal third. In 1995, they finished the first half of the season on the first place. Because of the UN sanctions, in this period Vojvodina, as all the rest of the clubs from FR Yugoslavia, was not allowed to compete in European competitions and the question on how this generation would have played on the international scene was left. However, in 1995, Vojvodina played a friendly match in Amsterdam against Ajax, in the season when they won the UEFA Champions League, where the "old lady" of Serbian football defeated them by 3–2. In 1997, Vojvodina achieved also the cup final, but lost against Red Star. In 1998, Vojvodina started one after another victory in UEFA Intertoto Cup. After eliminating Stabæk (2–0, 2–2), Örebro SK (3–0, 1–0) and Baltika Kaliningrad (3–0, 1–0) in the first three rounds, Vojvodina played the semi-final against SC Bastia. In the first leg, held in Bastia, Vojvodina suffered a 2–0 defeat. Although they were not given any chances in the return leg in Novi Sad, Vojvodina pulled off a convincing 4–0 win. The cup final was played against Werder Bremen. The first match in Bremen was lost by 1–0 and the return game ended with 1–1. Vojvodina coach was Tomislav Manojlović and the red-white jersey was worn by players like Nikola Lazetić, Zdravko Drinčić, Vidak Bratić, Jovan Tanasijević, Vladimir Mudrinić, Zoran Janković, Dragan Žilić, Mićo Vranješ, Saša Cilinšek, Vladimir Matijašević and Leo Lerinc.

Vojvodina's team of the decade 2000–2010, elected by the fans.

In the 2000/01 season, Vojvodina fought unexpectedly for competitive survival in the elite and the club ran into financial problems. The departure of the club director Svetozar Šapurić opened the descent and Vojvodina entered into a several-year long crisis. In a short period of time, numerous managers and coaches were changed regularly and the situation deteriorated more and more. This was a period of mediocre results and the circle of selling the best players to richer European clubs after just a couple of seasons of first-team football and replacing them with fresh young talents. Despite that, at that period, a large number of class players worn the jersey of Vojvodina like Miloš Krasić, Milan Jovanović, Milan Stepanov, Ranko Despotović, Vlada Avramov, Bojan Neziri, Vidak Bratić, Jovan Tanasijević, Radoslav Batak, Milan Vještica, Milan Belić and Miodrag Stošić. In 2005, as a final act of desperation, the organised supporters, the Firmaši and Vojvodina's oldest supporters, called the Stara Garda (English: Old Guard), gathered and took over the assembly of the club to make the public aware on their dissatisfaction and the bad situation in the club. In the same year, the newly arrived club president Ratko Butorović announced a better future for club. The squad was improved and in fact followed the stabilization and the rise of the club, both financial and in terms of results. Also, the management announced large reconstructions of the stadium and training facility, which were realized in the following years.

Many players contributed to these successes, some of them are Gojko Kačar, Dušan Tadić, Dragan Mrđa, Marcelo Pletsch, Aboubakar Oumarou, Ranko Despotović, Željko Brkić, Daniel Mojsov, Slobodan Medojević, Miroslav Stevanović, Vlatko Grozdanoski, Giorgi Merebashvili, Miroslav Vulićević, Brana Ilić, Branislav Trajković, Vuk Mitošević, Damir Kahriman, Janko Tumbasević, Darko Lovrić, Savo Pavićević, Joseph Kizito, Danijel Aleksić, Mario Gjurovski, Aleksandar Katai, Nino Pekarić, Vladimir Buač, Nikola Petković and Stephen Appiah.

== Club colours and crest ==
Vojvodina played its first match in bright blue colours and white shorts. Some of the first Vojvodina players and management studied in Prague and were also members of football club Slavia Prague. The Czech club supported the Vojvodina members during the difficult times before and during World War I and contributed in the development of the club. In 1920, was brought from Prague the first set of red and white jerseys. At the club meeting held on 23 July 1922, it was decided that in honour of Slavia Prague the red and white colors adorn the jerseys of Vojvodina. The coat of arms was also partially modeled after Slavia Prague's coat of arms, where the red star of the Czech club was replaced with the blue star, so that Vojvodina's coat of arms had all the colors of the Serbian flag.

== Stadium and training facility ==
=== Stadium ===
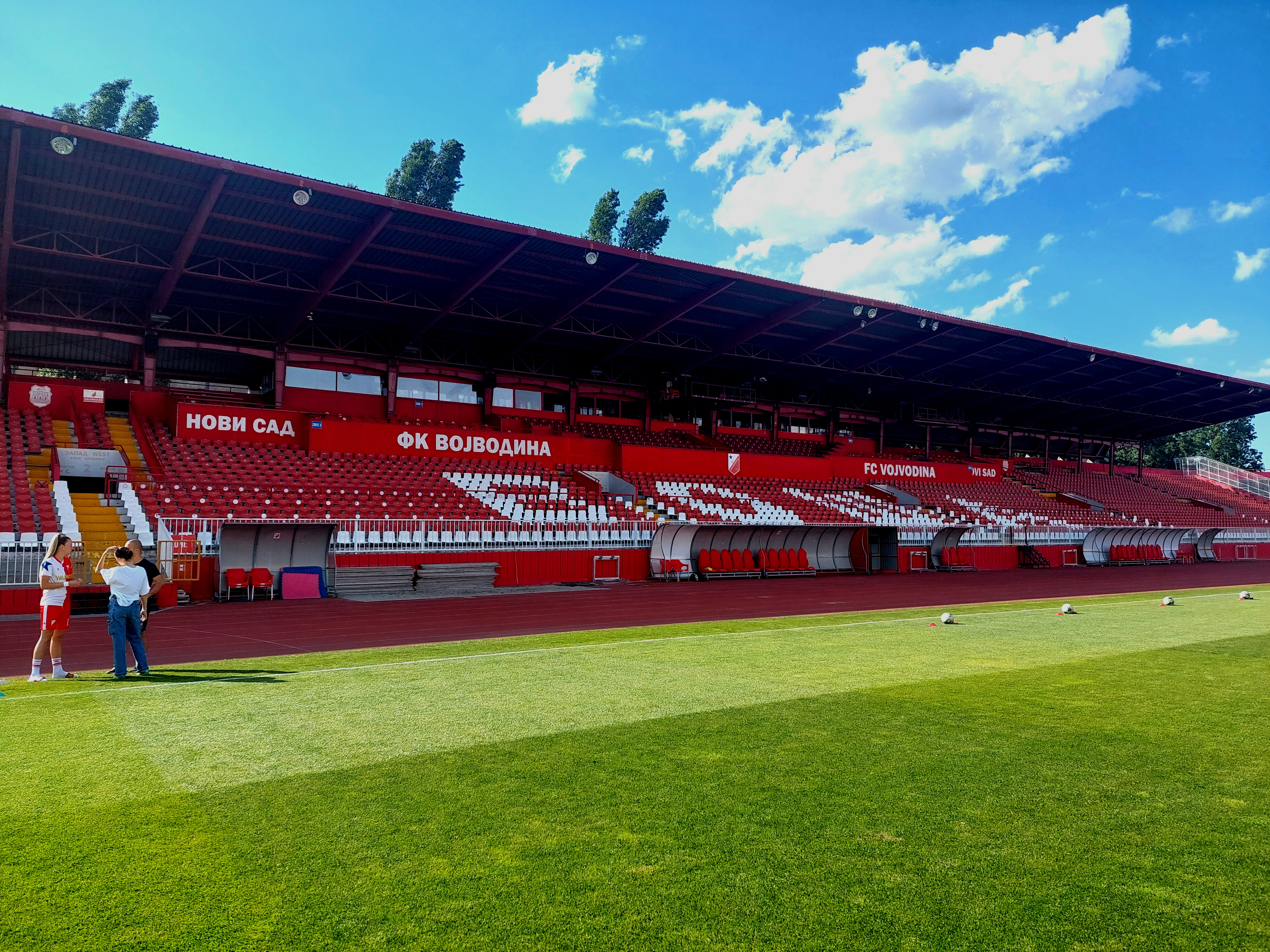

The home field of Vojvodina is the Karađorđe Stadium. It is named after Karađorđe, the leader of the First Serbian uprising against the Ottoman occupation. Formerly, it was known as the City Stadium or Vojvodina Stadium, but it was renamed on request of the Vojvodina fans in 2007 to Karađorđe Stadium. However, it was in fact the older and original name of the stadium that was used from its foundation until the end of World War II. With a total capacity of about 20 000, of which 15 000 seats, it is one of the largest football stadiums in Serbia. The stadium has a new athletic track, and it is equipped with new Philips LED lights and 1700 lux strong floodlights. The stadium features a VIP sector with 150 seats, VIP café-restaurant, press center, and 14 fully equipped broadcast cabins. It is also the home ground for the Serbian U-21 football team.

In 2012, the executive board announced further reconstructions of Karadjordje Stadium. These will include a new South stand, the reconstruction of Eastern and Southwest stands, and the covering of the whole stadium. The reconstruction will increase the stadium's capacity approximately to 19,500 seats.

=== Training facility ===
The FC Vujadin Boškov is the club's training facility and youth academy base. The sports complex is located in Veternik, Novi Sad and was named after football legend Vujadin Boškov. The center has over 85,000 square meters of sports facilities and 2,000 square meters of enclosed space. It has six courts, one with artificial grass and two surrounded by bleachers. It has 8 double rooms and 2 luxury suites, and each unit have most modern equipment. A kitchen supplies the senior team and all the younger categories. The sports complex has also a changing room, gym, medical center, laundry facilities and in the main building houses two press centers. Recreational facility and amusement at both facilities include TV, billiards, table football, computers, air conditioners and other equipment. The sport complex is today among the highest value in Southeast Europe.

== Youth academy ==
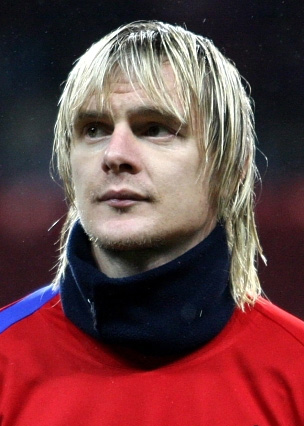
Miloš Krasić, former youth player of Vojvodina.

The clubs scout network, the modern club's training ground and the youth academy base FC Vujadin Boškov, which is professionally equipped, Vojvodina has developed professional footballers such as Miloš Krasić, Gojko Kačar, Milan Stepanov, Srđan Bajčetić, Dušan Tadić, Željko Brkić, Danijel Aleksić, Slobodan Medojević, Aleksandar Katai, Goran Šaula, Jovo Bosančić, Damir Stojak, Miroslav Stevanović, Sergej Milinković-Savić, Mijat Gaćinović, Milan Jovanović among others. In 2008 and 2009, Vojvodina organized together with the A.C. Milan a training camp at the FC Vujadin Boškov. The Vojvodina junior players were trained there by Milan training techniques and methods. In 2012, Vojvodina's team, led by coach Milan Kosanović, won the Serbian youth championship.

== Supporters ==
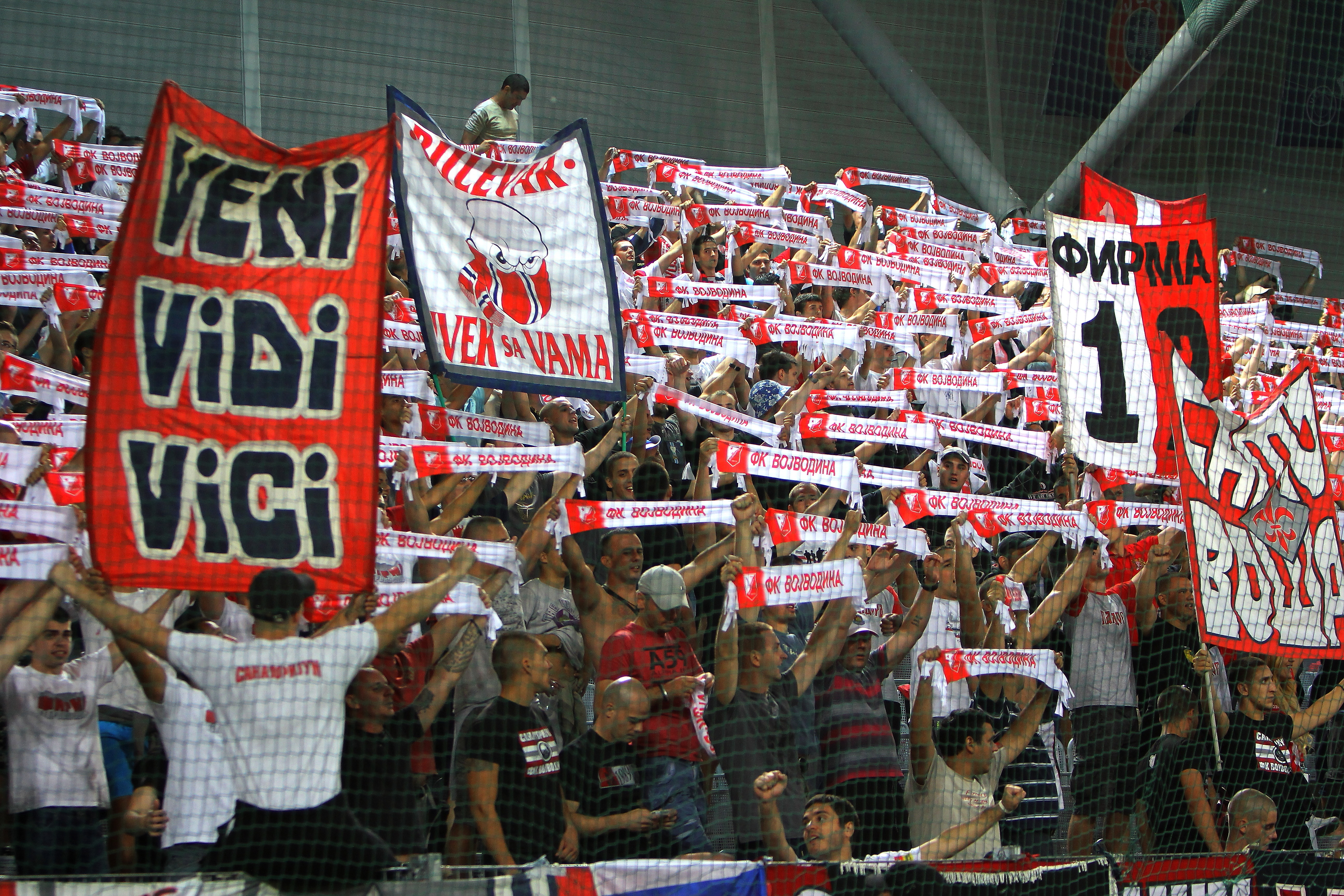
The Firmaši during the UEFA Europa League away match against Rapid Wien in 2012.

In 1931, one of the first organized supports of Vojvodina fans was recorded during an away match against Mačva Šabac. Already in 1937, the first organized supporters club was established, probably the first organized supporter group in the former Yugoslavia.

Although the club had numerous supporters throughout the history, more organized groups emerged end of the 1970s and beginning of the 1980s. In 1989, for the first time starts the idea of uniting of all the smaller supporter groups. This idea is realized and the group was named Red Firm. A few days later, several youngsters established the group Firma (lit. 'The Firm') as one of the subgroups, because they wanted a Serbian name for their group. The disintegration of Yugoslavia and its followers led to stagnation in all Yugoslavian supporter groups, so that in 1992, the Red Firm fell apart and the Firma took over the leadership of the organized supporters.

The members of Firma call themselves Firmaši (lit. 'Members of the Firma'), the plural of the singular form Firmaš, and belong today to the top supporter groups in Serbia. They are more known as ultras, not hooligans. However, they always protected the name and honour of FK Vojvodina, Novi Sad, and Serbia – putting themselves against all who were not doing enough for the club. The Firmaši gather in the north stand of the Karađorđe Stadium, from where they fiercely support their club. Besides football, they also support other sport sections of the Vojvodina Novi Sad Sport Association. The club also has a group of their oldest supporters, called the Stara Garda (lit. 'Old Guard') and who are for more than 40 years in the east stand of the stadium.

== Honours ==
=== Domestic ===
==== National League – 2 ====
- Yugoslav First League
  - Winners: (2) 1965–66, 1988–89
  - Runners-up: (3) 1956–57, 1961–62, 1974–75
- Serbian SuperLiga
  - Runners-up: (2) 2008–09, 2025–26
- Yugoslav Second League
  - Winners: (1): 1986–87 (West)
- Yugoslav Summer Champions League:
  - Winners: (1) 1970

==== National Cups – 2 ====
- Yugoslav Cup
  - Runners-up: (1) 1951
- Serbia and Montenegro Cup
  - Runners-up: (1) 1996–97
- Serbian Cup
  - Winners: (2) 2013–14, 2019–20
  - Runners-up: (7) 2006–07, 2009–10, 2010–11, 2012–13, 2023–24, 2024–25, 2025–26

==== Super Cups ====
- Yugoslav Super Cup
  - Runners-up (1): 1989

=== International ===
- European Cup / UEFA Champions League
  - Quarter-finalists: 1966–67
- UEFA Intertoto Cup
  - Winners: 1976
  - Runners-up: 1998
- Mitropa Cup
  - Winners: 1976–77
  - Runners-up: 1957
- Inter-Cities Fairs Cup
  - Quarter-finalists: 1961–62, 1967–68

=== Individual awards ===
Yugoslav First League top scorers

Season	Name	Goals
1955–56	(Socialist Federal Republic of Yugoslavia) Todor Veselinović	21
1956–57	(Socialist Federal Republic of Yugoslavia) Todor Veselinović	28
1957–58	(Socialist Federal Republic of Yugoslavia) Todor Veselinović	19
1960–61	(Socialist Federal Republic of Yugoslavia) Todor Veselinović	16

First League of Serbia and Montenegro top scorers

Season	Name	Goals
1992–93	(Federal Republic of Yugoslavia) Vesko Mihajlović	22

Serbian SuperLiga top scorers

Season	Name	Goals
2009–10	(Serbia) Dragan Mrđa	22

Serbian SuperLiga Footballer of the Year

- (Serbia) Dragan Mrđa (2009–10)

Serbian SuperLiga Young Footballer of the Year

- (Serbia) Slobodan Medojević (2010–11)

== Club records ==
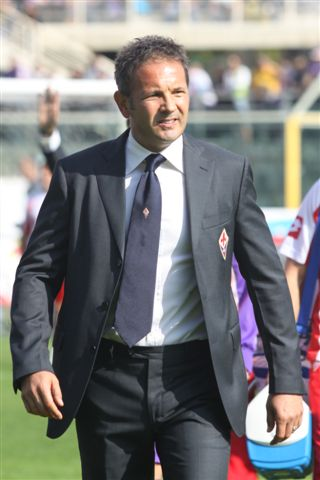
Siniša Mihajlović.

Radomir Krstić is Vojvodinas's record-holder by number of appearances (613 matches). The goal-scoring record-holder is striker Todor Veselinović, with 586 goals (of it 130 goals in the Yugoslav championship). He was also the top scorer of the Yugoslav league in 1956, 1957, 1958 and 1961. In addition, Vojvodina had two more top scorers in its history. In 1993, Vesko Mihajlović with 22 goals and in 2010, Dragan Mrdja also with 22 goals. The first player of Vojvodina, who wore the representative jersey of Yugoslavia was Abraham Saraz Eugen in 1922, where he scored two goals in the match against Czechoslovakia. Since then, numerous Vojvodina football players were in the Yugoslav national team and Todor Veselinović, Vujadin Boškov, Zdravko Rajkov, Dobrosav Krstić, Silvester Takač, Žarko Nikolić, Dobrivoje Trivić and Siniša Mihajlović (a former player of Inter Milan) are among them.

=== Player records ===
Name	Apps
(Socialist Federal Republic of Yugoslavia) Radomir Krstić	613
(Socialist Federal Republic of Yugoslavia) Petar Nikezić	587
(Socialist Federal Republic of Yugoslavia) Žarko Nikolić	563
(Socialist Federal Republic of Yugoslavia) Zdravko Rajkov	555
(Socialist Federal Republic of Yugoslavia) Todor Veselinović	546
(Socialist Federal Republic of Yugoslavia) Sima Milovanov	532
(Socialist Federal Republic of Yugoslavia) Đorđe Vujkov	527
(Socialist Federal Republic of Yugoslavia) Slavko Ličinar	524
(Socialist Federal Republic of Yugoslavia) Šandor Mokuš	519
(Socialist Federal Republic of Yugoslavia) Vujadin Boškov	512

=== Club all-time European record ===
As of 15 August 2024

Competition	P	W	D	L	GF	GA	GD
European Cup / Champions League	9	5	1	3	10	9	+1
UEFA Cup / Europa League	61	24	14	23	89	84	+5
UEFA Conference League	8	3	1	4	7	13	–6
UEFA Intertoto Cup	10	6	1	3	18	9	+9
Mitropa Cup	37	13	11	13	57	51	+6
Inter-Cities Fairs Cup	23	9	6	8	27	22	+5

=== UEFA coefficient ===
Correct as of 1 July 2026.

Rank	Team	Points
261	(Slovakia) Žilina	5.500
262	(Malta) Hibernians	5.500
263	(Serbia) Vojvodina	5.500
264	(Hungary) Videoton	5.500
265	(Israel) Maccabi Petah Tikva	5.500

==== Best results in European competitions ====
Season	Achievement	Notes
European Cup / UEFA Champions League
1967	Quarter Final	eliminated by (Scotland) Celtic 1–0 in Novi Sad, 0–2 in Glasgow
Mitropa Cup
1977	Winner	First in group with (Hungary) Vasas, (Italy) Fiorentina and (Czech Republic) Sparta Prague
UEFA Intertoto Cup
1976	Winner	First in group with (Poland) Zagłębie, (Austria) LASK Linz and (Sweden) Örebro SK
1998	Runner-up	lost to (Germany) Werder Bremen 0–1 in Bremen, 1–1 in Novi Sad

Biggest win in UEFA competition:

Season	Match	Score
UEFA Cup / UEFA Europa League
2015–16	Vojvodina – (Italy) Sampdoria	4–0
2007–08	Vojvodina – (Malta) Hibernians	5–1
Inter-Cities Fairs Cup
1961–62	Vojvodina – (Greece) Iraklis	9–1
Mitropa Cup
1956–57	Vojvodina – (Slovakia) Slovan Bratislava	6–0
1959–60	Vojvodina – (Austria) Wacker Vienna	5–0
UEFA Intertoto Cup
1987–88	Vojvodina – (Hungary) MTK Budapest	5–0
1977–78	Vojvodina – (Norway) IK Start	5–1
1964–65	Vojvodina – (Austria) First Vienna	5–2

=== European matches since 2010 ===
Season	Competition	Round	Club	Home	Away	Aggregate
2011–12	UEFA Europa League	2Q	(Liechtenstein) Vaduz	1–3	2–0	3–3 (a)
2012–13	UEFA Europa League	2Q	(Lithuania) Sūduva	1–1	4–0	5–1
2012–13	UEFA Europa League	3Q	(Austria) Rapid Wien	2–1	0–2	2–3
2013–14	UEFA Europa League	1Q	(Malta) Hibernians	3–2	4–1	7–3
2013–14	UEFA Europa League	2Q	(Hungary) Budapest Honvéd	2–0	3–1	5–1
2013–14	UEFA Europa League	3Q	(Turkey) Bursaspor	2–2	3–0	5–2
2013–14	UEFA Europa League	PO	(Moldova) Sheriff Tiraspol	1–1	1–2	2–3
2014–15	UEFA Europa League	2Q	(Slovakia) AS Trenčín	3–0	0–4	3–4
2015–16	UEFA Europa League	1Q	(Hungary) MTK Budapest	3–1	0–0	3–1
2015–16	UEFA Europa League	2Q	(Latvia) Spartaks Jūrmala	3–0	1–1	4–1
2015–16	UEFA Europa League	3Q	(Italy) Sampdoria	0–2	4–0	4–2
2015–16	UEFA Europa League	PO	(Czech Republic) Viktoria Plzeň	0–3	0–2	0–5
2016–17	UEFA Europa League	1Q	(Montenegro) Bokelj	5–0	1–1	6–1
2016–17	UEFA Europa League	2Q	(Wales) Connah's Quay Nomads	1–0	2–1	3–1
2016–17	UEFA Europa League	3Q	(Belarus) Dinamo Minsk	1–1	2–0	3–1
2016–17	UEFA Europa League	PO	(Netherlands) AZ	0–3	0–0	0–3
2017–18	UEFA Europa League	1Q	(Slovakia) Ružomberok	2–1	0–2	2–3
2020–21	UEFA Europa League	3Q	(Belgium) Standard Liège	—N/a	1–2 (a.e.t.)	—N/a
2021–22	UEFA Europa Conference League	2Q	(Lithuania) Panevėžys	1–0	1–0	2–0
2021–22	UEFA Europa Conference League	3Q	(Austria) LASK	0–1	1–6	1–7
2023–24	UEFA Europa Conference League	2Q	(Cyprus) APOEL	1–2	1–2	2–4
2024–25	UEFA Europa League	2Q	(Netherlands) Ajax	1–3	0–1	1–4
2024–25	UEFA Conference League	3Q	(Slovenia) Maribor	1–0 (a.e.t.)	1–2	2–2 (2–4 p)
2026–27	UEFA Europa League	1Q	(Hungary) Ferencváros	1–2	0–3	1–5
2026–27	UEFA Conference League	2Q	(Netherlands) Ajax	1–4	1–4	2–8

== Current squad ==
As of 29 August 2026

Note: Flags indicate national team as defined under FIFA eligibility rules; some limited exceptions apply. Players may hold more than one non-FIFA nationality.

No.	Pos.	Nation	Player
1	GK	SRB	Matija Gočmanac
2	DF	CMR	Kufre Eta
3	DF	SRB	Dušan Cupara
4	MF	SRB	Marko Poletanović
5	DF	SRB	Đorđe Crnomarković
6	DF	SRB	Siniša Tanjga
7	MF	SRB	Stefan Mitrović (on loan from (Italy) Hellas Verona)
8	MF	SRB	Marko Veličković
9	FW	SRB	Aleksa Vukanović
10	MF	SRB	Dejan Zukić (captain)
12	GK	SRB	Dragan Rosić
13	MF	SRB	Vladan Novevski
15	DF	SRB	Erhan Mašović
16	DF	ROU	Mihai Butean
18	MF	SRB	Njegoš Petrović (vice-captain)

No.	Pos.	Nation	Player
19	FW	SRB	Stefan Stanisavljević
20	MF	SRB	Dragan Kokanović
21	FW	SRB	Milan Kolarević
22	DF	SRB	Lazar Nikolić
23	DF	BRA	Lucas Barros
24	MF	SRB	Jovan Ostojić
26	DF	HUN	Kornél Szűcs
27	MF	SRB	Petar Sukačev
28	DF	SRB	Vukašin Davidov
32	FW	SRB	David Milovanović
33	FW	SRB	Vuk Boškan
35	MF	BIH	Ifet Đakovac
66	DF	SRB	Mateja Gašić
77	MF	SRB	Lazar Ranđelović
99	FW	BIH	Nardin Mulahusejnović

=== On dual registration ===
Note: Flags indicate national team as defined under FIFA eligibility rules; some limited exceptions apply. Players may hold more than one non-FIFA nationality.

No.	Pos.	Nation	Player
71	GK	SRB	Bogdan Bogdanović (at Kabel until winter transfer window)

=== Players with multiple nationalities ===
- (Serbia) (Canada) Stefan Mitrović
- (Serbia) (North Macedonia) Vladan Novevski
- (Serbia) (Slovenia) Vuk Boškan
- (Bosnia and Herzegovina) (Serbia) Ifet Đakovac

=== Out on loan ===
Note: Flags indicate national team as defined under FIFA eligibility rules; some limited exceptions apply. Players may hold more than one non-FIFA nationality.

No.	Pos.	Nation	Player
—	GK	SRB	Branko Nikolić (at Bor until the end of the season)
—	GK	SRB	Viktor Matić (at Indeks until the end of the season)
—	DF	SRB	Vukašin Kravić (at OFK Vršac until the end of the season)
—	DF	BIH	Hamza Redžić (at Bor until the end of the season)
—	DF	SRB	Vladimir Mićunović (at OFK Vrbas until the end of the season)
—	MF	SRB	Andrej Pivaš (at OFK Vršac until the end of the season)
—	MF	SRB	Nikola Ninković (at Indeks until the end of the season)
—	MF	SRB	Đorđe Đorđić (at Mačva Šabac until winter transfer window)
—	MF	SRB	Novak Gojkov (at OFK Vršac until winter transfer window)
—	MF	SRB	Dario Janjić (at Kabel until winter transfer window)

No.	Pos.	Nation	Player
—	MF	SRB	Tadija Stanišić (at Kabel until winter transfer window)
—	FW	GHA	Ibrahim Mustapha (at Radnički Niš until the end of the season)
—	FW	BIH	Srđan Bašić (at OFK Vršac until the end of the season)
—	FW	SRB	Damjan Đokanović (at Bor until the end of the season)
—	FW	SRB	Lazar Peranović (at Bor until the end of the season)
—	FW	SRB	Uroš Paunović (at Kabel until winter transfer window)
—	FW	SRB	Uroš Pavlović (at Real Podunavci until the end of the season)
—	FW	MNE	Petar Jauković (at (Montenegro) Sutjeska Nikšić until the end of the season)
—	FW	SRB	Milutin Vidosavljević (at (Russia) Akron Tolyatti until the end of the season)

== Technical staff ==
As of 7 August 2026

Current technical staff
- Head coach: (Serbia) Marko Savić
- Assistant coach: (Serbia) Nikola Mitić
- Assistant coach: (Serbia) Nikola Puača
- Assistant coach: (Serbia) Slobodan Medojević
- Assistant coach: (Serbia) Goran Žmukić
- Assistant coach: (Serbia) Predrag Kandić
- Goalkeeping coach: (Serbia) Srđan Žakula
- Fitness coach: (Serbia) Uroš Nikolić
- Fitness coach: (Serbia) Aleksandar Jovančević
- Fitness coach: (Serbia) Luka Miljević
- Fitness coach: (Serbia) Bojan Rašković
- Fitness coach: (Serbia) Bojan Antonić
- Analyst: (Serbia) Igor Gagričić
- Doctor: (Serbia) Borko Vukosav
- Doctor: (Serbia) Nikola Vukosav
- Doctor: (Serbia) Branko Baljak
- Physiotherapist: (Serbia) Goran Marijan
- Physiotherapist: (Serbia) Nemanja Mijić
- Physiotherapist: (Serbia) Marijan Ciganović
- Physiotherapist: (Serbia) Miloš Orlić
- Kit manager: (Serbia) Nemanja Jotanović
- Kit manager: (Serbia) Dragan Vasić
- Club representative: (Serbia) Tadija Stantić

== Board and management ==
As of 8 October 2026

Current management
- President: (Serbia) Dragoljub Zbiljić
- Vice-president: (Serbia) Miroslav Tanjga
- Board of directors: (Serbia) Ljubomir Apro, (Serbia) Nikola Vasiljević, (Serbia) Nenad Novaković, (Serbia) Marko Bosanac, (Serbia) Petar Đurđev, (Serbia) Boris Dumnić, (Serbia) Darko Jevtić, (Serbia) Vasa Pušibrk
- General director: (Serbia) Dušan Bajatović
- Sporting director: (Serbia) Vladimir Jugović
- Assistant to the general manager: (Serbia) Aleksandar Vojnović
- President of the assembly: (Serbia) Milan N. Đukić
- Director of youth academy: (Serbia) Duško Grujić
- Director of stadium: (Serbia) Jelena Kulpinski
- Deputy director of stadium: (Serbia) Siniša Popović
- Secretary: (Serbia) Aleksandar Vlaškalić
- President of the supervisory board: (Serbia) Saša Đurđević
- Members of the supervisory board: (Serbia) Goran Karadarević, (Serbia) Dragana Saratlić
- President of the veteran’s section: (Serbia) Miladin Purać

== Notable players ==
For all players, see: List of FK Vojvodina players.

To appear in this section a player must have either:

- Played at least 100 games in Serbian top league.
- Played at least 80 games for the club.
- Set a club record or won an individual award while at the club.
- Played at least one international match for their national team at any time.
- (Kingdom of Yugoslavia) Radivoj Božić
- (Kingdom of Yugoslavia) Svetozar Đanić
- (Kingdom of Yugoslavia) Rodoljub Malenčić
- (Kingdom of Yugoslavia) Dušan Marković
- (Kingdom of Yugoslavia) Ivan Medarić
- (Kingdom of Yugoslavia) Božidar Petrović
- (Kingdom of Yugoslavia) (Slovakia) Ján Podhradský
- (Kingdom of Yugoslavia) Zvonko Požega
- (Kingdom of Yugoslavia) Jenő Ábrahám Saraz
- (Kingdom of Yugoslavia) Jožef Velker
- (Socialist Federal Republic of Yugoslavia) Rajko Aleksić
- (Socialist Federal Republic of Yugoslavia) Stevan Bena
- (Socialist Federal Republic of Yugoslavia) Vujadin Boškov
- (Socialist Federal Republic of Yugoslavia) Dragan Bošnjak
- (Socialist Federal Republic of Yugoslavia) Ivica Brzić
- (Socialist Federal Republic of Yugoslavia) Miroslav Ćurčić
- (Socialist Federal Republic of Yugoslavia) Josif Ilić
- (Socialist Federal Republic of Yugoslavia) Zvonko Ivezić
- (Socialist Federal Republic of Yugoslavia) Aleksandar Ivoš
- (Socialist Federal Republic of Yugoslavia) Željko Jurčić
- (Socialist Federal Republic of Yugoslavia) Dobrosav Krstić
- (Socialist Federal Republic of Yugoslavia) Miodrag Kustudić
- (Socialist Federal Republic of Yugoslavia) Čedo Maras
- (Socialist Federal Republic of Yugoslavia) Zoran Marić
- (Socialist Federal Republic of Yugoslavia) Dušan Mijić
- (Socialist Federal Republic of Yugoslavia) Đorđe Milić
- (Socialist Federal Republic of Yugoslavia) Sima Milovanov
- (Socialist Federal Republic of Yugoslavia) Zoran Mijucić
- (Socialist Federal Republic of Yugoslavia) Petar Nikezić
- (Socialist Federal Republic of Yugoslavia) Žarko Nikolić
- (Socialist Federal Republic of Yugoslavia) Martin Novoselac
- (Socialist Federal Republic of Yugoslavia) Ilija Pantelić
- (Socialist Federal Republic of Yugoslavia) Slobodan Pavković
- (Socialist Federal Republic of Yugoslavia) Đorđe Pavlić
- (Socialist Federal Republic of Yugoslavia) Zdravko Rajkov
- (Socialist Federal Republic of Yugoslavia) Vasa Rutonjski
- (Socialist Federal Republic of Yugoslavia) Ratko Svilar
- (Socialist Federal Republic of Yugoslavia) Svetozar Šapurić
- (Socialist Federal Republic of Yugoslavia) Stevan Sekereš
- (Socialist Federal Republic of Yugoslavia) Miloš Šestić
- (Socialist Federal Republic of Yugoslavia) Ratko Svilar
- (Socialist Federal Republic of Yugoslavia) Slavko Svinjarević
- (Socialist Federal Republic of Yugoslavia) Silvester Takač
- (Socialist Federal Republic of Yugoslavia) Miroslav Tanjga
- (Socialist Federal Republic of Yugoslavia) Dobrivoje Trivić
- (Socialist Federal Republic of Yugoslavia) Todor Veselinović
- (Socialist Federal Republic of Yugoslavia) Ljubomir Vorkapić
- (Socialist Federal Republic of Yugoslavia) Nebojša Vučković
- (Socialist Federal Republic of Yugoslavia) Đorđe Vujkov
- (Socialist Federal Republic of Yugoslavia) Miroslav Vukašinović
- (Socialist Federal Republic of Yugoslavia) Josip Zemko
- (Socialist Federal Republic of Yugoslavia) Marijan Zovko
- (Federal Republic of Yugoslavia) Milan Belić
- (Federal Republic of Yugoslavia) Nikoslav Bjegović
- (Federal Republic of Yugoslavia) Igor Bogdanović
- (Federal Republic of Yugoslavia) Saša Cilinšek
- (Federal Republic of Yugoslavia) Ljubiša Dunđerski
- (Federal Republic of Yugoslavia) Dejan Govedarica
- (Federal Republic of Yugoslavia) Goran Jezdimirović
- (Federal Republic of Yugoslavia) Slaviša Jokanović
- (Serbia and Montenegro) Đorđe Jokić
- (Federal Republic of Yugoslavia) Aleksandar Kocić
- (Federal Republic of Yugoslavia) Radovan Krivokapić
- (Federal Republic of Yugoslavia) Nikola Lazetić
- (Federal Republic of Yugoslavia) Vladan Lukić
- (Federal Republic of Yugoslavia) Siniša Mihajlović
- (Federal Republic of Yugoslavia) Vesko Mihajlović
- (Serbia and Montenegro) Bojan Neziri
- (Federal Republic of Yugoslavia) Miodrag Pantelić
- (Federal Republic of Yugoslavia) Zoltan Sabo
- (Federal Republic of Yugoslavia) Radoslav Samardžić
- (Federal Republic of Yugoslavia) Goran Šaula
- (Federal Republic of Yugoslavia) Damir Stojak
- (Federal Republic of Yugoslavia) Budimir Vujačić
- (Federal Republic of Yugoslavia) Dragan Žilić
- (Federal Republic of Yugoslavia) Bratislav Živković
- (Serbia) Danijel Aleksić
- (Serbia) Enver Alivodić
- (Serbia) Vlada Avramov
- (Serbia) Željko Brkić
- (Serbia) Vladimir Buač
- (Serbia) Ranko Despotović
- (Serbia) Stefan Đorđević
- (Serbia) Igor Đurić
- (Serbia) Mijat Gaćinović
- (Serbia) Brana Ilić
- (Serbia) Dimitrije Injac
- (Serbia) Milan Jovanić
- (Serbia) Milan Jovanović
- (Serbia) Gojko Kačar
- (Serbia) Damir Kahriman
- (Serbia) Andrija Kaluđerović
- (Serbia) Aleksandar Katai
- (Serbia) Miloš Krasić
- (Serbia) (Bosnia and Herzegovina) Milan Lazarević
- (Serbia) Filip Malbašić
- (Serbia) Sergej Milinković-Savić
- (Serbia) Dragan Mrđa
- (Serbia) Aleksandar Paločević
- (Serbia) Nino Pekarić
- (Serbia) Emil Rockov
- (Serbia) Veljko Simić
- (Serbia) Milan Stepanov
- (Serbia) Dušan Tadić
- (Serbia) Mirko Topić
- (Serbia) Saša Todić
- (Serbia) Branislav Trajković
- (Serbia) Veseljko Trivunović
- (Serbia) Jagoš Vuković
- (Serbia) Miroslav Vulićević
- (Serbia) Dejan Zukić
- (Angola) Depú
- (Austria) Goran Kartalija
- (Bosnia and Herzegovina) Nemanja Bilbija
- (Bosnia and Herzegovina) Daniel Graovac
- (Bosnia and Herzegovina) Siniša Mulina
- (Bosnia and Herzegovina) (Serbia) Bojan Nastić
- (Bosnia and Herzegovina) Miroslav Stevanović
- (Bosnia and Herzegovina) Nemanja Supić
- (Bosnia and Herzegovina) Amir Teljigović
- (Bosnia and Herzegovina) Stojan Vranješ
- (Bulgaria) Zoran Janković
- (Canada) Stefan Cebara
- (Cameroon) Aboubakar Oumarou
- (Croatia) Veldin Karić
- (Czechoslovakia) Josef Čapek
- (Democratic Republic of the Congo) Jonathan Bolingi
- (Gabon) Anselme Délicat
- (Georgia (country)) Giorgi Merebashvili
- (Georgia (country)) Guram Giorbelidze
- (Ghana) Sadick Adams
- (Ghana) Stephen Appiah
- (Ghana) Yaw Antwi
- (Guinea-Bissau) (Portugal) Almami Moreira
- (Hungary) János Borsó
- (Indonesia) Ilija Spasojević
- (Kenya) Collins Sichenje
- (Luxembourg) (Serbia) Seid Korać
- (Mali) Mamadou Traoré
- (North Macedonia) Daniel Avramovski
- (North Macedonia) Mario Đurovski
- (North Macedonia) Vlatko Grozdanoski
- (North Macedonia) Sašo Miloševski
- (North Macedonia) Daniel Mojsov
- (North Macedonia) Borislav Tomovski
- (Montenegro) Radoslav Batak
- (Montenegro) Lazar Carević
- (Montenegro) Ivan Fatić
- (Montenegro) (Serbia) Mirko Ivanić
- (Montenegro) Asmir Kajević
- (Montenegro) Vasko Kalezić
- (Montenegro) Damir Kojašević
- (Montenegro) Šaleta Kordić
- (Montenegro) Nebojša Kosović
- (Montenegro) Risto Lakić
- (Montenegro) Savo Pavićević
- (Montenegro) (Serbia) Andrija Radulović
- (Montenegro) Nemanja Sekulić
- (Montenegro) Jovan Tanasijević
- (Montenegro) Janko Tumbasević
- (Montenegro) Igor Vujačić
- (Montenegro) Marko Vukčević
- (Montenegro) (Serbia and Montenegro) Simon Vukčević
- (Nigeria) Nnaemeka Ajuru
- (Romania) Alin Stoica
- (Sweden) Niclas Nyhlén
- (Uganda) Joseph Kizito
- (Uganda) Eugene Sseppuya

For the list of all current and former players with Wikipedia article, please see: Category:FK Vojvodina players.

== Managerial history ==
- (Kingdom of Yugoslavia) Kosta Hadži (1924–1926)
- (Austria) Otto Neczas (1926–1928)
- (Kingdom of Yugoslavia) Boško Simonović (1929)
- (Austria) Otto Neczas (1929–30)
- (Austria) Otto Hamacek (1930–32)
- (Hungary) Károly Nemes (1932–1933)
- (Federal State of Austria) Willi Schürmann (1934–35)
- (Federal State of Austria) Fritz Levitus (1936–1938)
- (Kingdom of Yugoslavia) Milorad Ognjanov (1938–1939)
- (Kingdom of Hungary (1920–1946)) Károly Nemes (1940)
- (Kingdom of Hungary (1920–1946)) János Neu (1941)
- (Socialist Federal Republic of Yugoslavia) Milorad Ognjanov (1945–1947)
- (Socialist Federal Republic of Yugoslavia) Bane Sekulić (1948–1951)
- (Socialist Federal Republic of Yugoslavia) Ljubiša Broćić (1952)
- (Socialist Federal Republic of Yugoslavia) Milorad Ognjanov (1952)
- (Socialist Federal Republic of Yugoslavia) Gustav Lechner (1953–1957)
- (Hungarian People's Republic) Antal Lyka (1957–1959)
- (Socialist Federal Republic of Yugoslavia) Ratomir Čabrić (1959–60)
- (Socialist Federal Republic of Yugoslavia) Radoslav Momirski (1960–61)
- (Socialist Federal Republic of Yugoslavia) Franja Hirman (1961–1964)
- (Socialist Federal Republic of Yugoslavia) Branko Stanković (1964–1967)
- (Socialist Federal Republic of Yugoslavia) Zdravko Rajkov (1967–68)
- (Socialist Federal Republic of Yugoslavia) Ratomir Čabrić (1968–70)
- (Socialist Federal Republic of Yugoslavia) Dragoljub Milošević (1970–1973)
- (Socialist Federal Republic of Yugoslavia) Gojko Zec (1973–74)
- (Socialist Federal Republic of Yugoslavia) Todor Veselinović (1974–1977)
- (Socialist Federal Republic of Yugoslavia) Branko Stanković (1977–78)
- (Socialist Federal Republic of Yugoslavia) Ivica Brzić (1978–79)
- (Socialist Federal Republic of Yugoslavia) Milorad Pavić (1979)
- (Socialist Federal Republic of Yugoslavia) Marko Valok (1980)
- (Socialist Federal Republic of Yugoslavia) Dušan Drašković (1981–1983)
- (Socialist Federal Republic of Yugoslavia) Tomislav Kaloperović (1983)
- (Socialist Federal Republic of Yugoslavia) Josip Duvančić (1983–84)
- (Socialist Federal Republic of Yugoslavia) Jovan Kovrlija (1984)
- (Socialist Federal Republic of Yugoslavia) Vukašin Višnjevac (1985)
- (Socialist Federal Republic of Yugoslavia) Tomislav Kaloperović (1985)
- (Socialist Federal Republic of Yugoslavia) Vladimir Savić (1986)
- (Socialist Federal Republic of Yugoslavia) Željko Jurčić (1986)
- (Socialist Federal Republic of Yugoslavia) Tonko Vukušić (1986–87)
- (Socialist Federal Republic of Yugoslavia) Ivica Brzić (1987–88)
- (Socialist Federal Republic of Yugoslavia) Ljupko Petrović (1988–1989)
- (Socialist Federal Republic of Yugoslavia) Ivica Brzić (1990–91)
- (Socialist Federal Republic of Yugoslavia) Žarko Nikolić (1991)
- (Socialist Federal Republic of Yugoslavia) Jovan Kovrlija (1991–92)
- (Federal Republic of Yugoslavia) Milorad Kosanović (1992–95)
- (North Macedonia) Gjoko Hadžievski (1995–96)
- (Federal Republic of Yugoslavia) Dragoljub Bekvalac (1996)
- (Federal Republic of Yugoslavia) Ljupko Petrović (1996–97)
- (Federal Republic of Yugoslavia) Josip Pirmajer (1997–98)
- (Federal Republic of Yugoslavia) Tomislav Manojlović (1998–00)
- (Federal Republic of Yugoslavia) Dragoljub Bekvalac (2000)
- (Federal Republic of Yugoslavia) Dragan Okuka (2000)
- (Federal Republic of Yugoslavia) Dragoljub Bekvalac (2000–01)
- (Federal Republic of Yugoslavia) Slobodan Pavković (2001–02)
- (Federal Republic of Yugoslavia) Miroslav Vukašinović (2002–03)
- (Federal Republic of Yugoslavia) Josif Ilić (2003)
- (Federal Republic of Yugoslavia) Branko Smiljanić (2004–9 Nov 2004)
- (Federal Republic of Yugoslavia) Vladimir Petrović (24 Nov 2004 – 26 Dec 2004)
- (Federal Republic of Yugoslavia) Milan Đuričić (27 Dec 2004 – 14 Aug 2005)
- (Serbia) Zoran Marić (20 Aug 2005 – 13 Aug 2006)
- (Serbia) Milovan Rajevac (17 Aug 2006 – 17 Sep 2007)
- (Serbia) Ivica Brzić (18 Sep 2007 – 1 Jun 2008)
- (Serbia) Dragoljub Bekvalac (4 Jun 2008 – 20 Oct 2008)
- (Montenegro) Dragan Radojičić (21 Oct 2008 – 23 Dec 2008)
- (Serbia) Ljupko Petrović (23 Dec 2008 – 8 Mar 2009)
- (Serbia) Zoran Marić (9 Mar 2009 – 8 Jun 2009)
- (Serbia) Dragoslav Stepanović (8 Jun 2009 – 2 Oct 2009)
- (Serbia) Branko Babić (11 Oct 2009 – 9 Mar 2010)
- (Serbia) Milan Đuričić (10 Mar 2010 – 18 May 2010)
- (Serbia) Zoran Milinković (27 May 2010 – 30 May 2011)
- (Montenegro) Dejan Vukićević (15 Aug 2011 – 12 Apr 2012)
- (Serbia) Spasoje Jelačić (interim) (13 Apr 2012 – 23 Apr 2012)
- (Bulgaria) (Serbia) Zlatomir Zagorčić (interim) (23 Apr 2012 – 31 May 2012)
- (Bulgaria) (Serbia) Zlatomir Zagorčić (31 May 2012 – 12 Sep 2012)
- (Serbia) Nebojša Vignjević (12 Sep 2012 – 4 Jun 2013)
- (Serbia) Marko Nikolić (7 Jun 2013 – 9 Dec 2013)
- (Serbia) Branko Babić (3 Jan 2014 – 19 May 2014)
- (Serbia) Zoran Marić (19 Jun 2014 – 16 Mar 2015)
- (Bulgaria) (Serbia) Zlatomir Zagorčić (17 Mar 2015 – 22 Oct 2015)
- (Serbia) Nenad Lalatović (11 Nov 2015 – 17 Dec 2016)
- (Serbia) Dragan Ivanović (23 Dec 2016 – 3 Apr 2017)
- (Serbia) Aleksandar Veselinović (4 Apr 2017 – 21 Apr 2017)
- (Montenegro) (Serbia) Radoslav Batak (23 Apr 2017 – 29 Jun 2017)
- (Serbia) Nenad Vanić (30 Jun 2017 – 9 Sep 2017)
- (Serbia) Vladimir Buač (21 Sep 2017 – 30 Nov 2017)
- (Serbia) Ilija Stolica (23 Dec 2017 – 4 Apr 2018)
- (Serbia) Aleksandar Veselinović (9 Apr 2018 – 7 Sep 2018)
- (Serbia) Dragan Okuka (7 Sep 2018 – 25 Nov 2018)
- (Serbia) Radovan Krivokapić (25 Nov 2018 – 29 Jun 2019)
- (Serbia) Nenad Lalatović (29 Jun 2019 – 26 May 2021)
- (Serbia) Slavoljub Đorđević (26 May 2021 – 14 Mar 2022)
- (Montenegro) Dragan Radojičić (15 Mar 2022 – 30 May 2022)
- (Serbia) Milan Rastavac (1 Jun 2022 – 25 Feb 2023)
- (Montenegro) (Serbia) Radoslav Batak (25 Feb 2023 – 8 Aug 2023)
- (Serbia) Ranko Popović (11 Aug 2023 – 21 Dec 2023)
- (Montenegro) Božidar Bandović (28 Dec 2023 – 27 Aug 2024)
- (Serbia) Nemanja Krtolica (27 Aug 2024 – 7 October 2024)
- (Serbia) Nenad Lalatović (7 October 2024 – 3 March 2025)
- (Serbia) Miroslav Tanjga (3 March 2025 – 25 July 2026)
- (Serbia) Marko Savić (28 July 2026 – )

== Kit manufacturers and shirt sponsors ==
=== Shirt sponsors and manufacturers ===
Period	Kit Manufacturer	Shirt Sponsor
1994–1996	Reusch	
1996–2002	NAAI	Braća Mandić
2002–2003	Lotto	
2003–2007	NAAI	
2007–2012	Joma	Aleksandar Gradnja
2012–2015	Joma	Volkswagen
2015–2017	Umbro	Volkswagen
2017–2018	Umbro	Viskol
2018–2019	Umbro	Srbijagas
2019–2024	Kelme	Srbijagas
2024–2026	Joma	MaxBet
2026–present	Capelli Sport	AdmiralBet
