= Mirkovac =

Mirkovac Keselyüs (Hungarian) Mирковац (Serbian)
- Village (Selo)
- Location of Mirkovac in Croatia Mirkovac (Croatia) Mirkovac (Europe)
- Coordinates: 45.73722222°N 18.79888889°E
- Country: Croatia
- Region: Baranya (Podunavlje)
- County: Osijek-Baranja
- Municipality: Kneževi Vinogradi

Area
  - Total: 0.4 km^{2} (0.15 sq mi)

Population (2021)
  - Total: 64
  - Density: 160/km^{2} (410/sq mi)
- Time zone: UTC+1 (CET)
  - Summer (DST): UTC+2 (CEST)

Mirkovac (Hungarian: Keselyüs; Serbian Cyrillic: Mирковац) is a settlement in the region of Baranja, Croatia. Administratively, it is located in the Kneževi Vinogradi municipality within the Osijek-Baranja County. Population is 135 people.

== Ethnic groups (2001 census) ==
- Croats = 118
- Serbs = 10
- Hungarians = 5
- others = 2

== Notable people ==
- Stevan Sekereš

== See also ==
- Osijek-Baranja county
- Baranja
