= Čedo Maras =

Yugoslav footballer

Personal information
- Full name: Čedo Maras
- Date of birth: 21 January 1959 (age 67)
- Place of birth: Sinj, PR Croatia, FPR Yugoslavia
- Height: 6 ft 4 in (1.93 m)
- Position: Goalkeeper

Senior career*
Years	Team	Apps	(Gls)
1978–1984	Osijek	5	(0)
1985–1986	Novi Sad	28	(0)
1987–1990	Vojvodina	76	(0)
1991	Bečej		
1992–1995	Croatia Đakovo		

International career
- Yugoslavia U21
- * Club domestic league appearances and goals

Čedo Maras (born January 21, 1959) is a retired football goalkeeper who played in Yugoslavia and Croatia. The most notable feat in his career was winning the 1988–89 Yugoslav First League as a member of FK Vojvodina.

== Club career ==
Born in Sinj (SR Croatia, SFR Yugoslavia), Maras made his debut in the Yugoslav First League with NK Osijek in the 1978–79 season. In 1985, he joined Second League side RFK Novi Sad but soon after he moved to FK Vojvodina where he will play until 1990 and be part of the championship winning squad in 1989. He later played with FK Bečej. During 1990s he played with NK Croatia Đakovo. Now he lives in Đakovo, Croatia.

== Sources ==
- Prva liga 90/91 (in Serbo-Croatian), Tempo, 1 August 1990
