= Bojan Neziri =

Serbian footballer

Personal information
- Full name: Bojan Neziri
- Date of birth: 26 February 1982 (age 44)
- Place of birth: Šabac, SFR Yugoslavia
- Height: 1.80 m (5 ft 11 in)
- Position: Left back

Youth career
- FK Šabac

Senior career*
Years	Team	Apps	(Gls)
1997–1998	Radnički Zorka	12	(1)
1998–2000	Mačva Šabac	31	(11)
2000–2003	Vojvodina	59	(0)
2003–2009	Metalurh Donetsk	51	(1)
2003	→ Shakhtar Donetsk (loan)	0	(0)
2003	→ Shakhtar-2 Donetsk (loan)	1	(0)
2005–2006	→ VfL Wolfsburg (loan)	20	(0)
2008	→ FC Brussels (loan)	14	(1)
2008–2009	Győri ETO	2	(0)
2009–2010	Győri ETO II	3	(0)
2011	Inđija	4	(0)
Total		203	(14)

International career^{‡}
2004–2005	Serbia and Montenegro U21		
2004–2005	Serbia and Montenegro	3	(0)
Medal record
Silver medal – second place	UEFA Under-21 Championship	2004
- * Club domestic league appearances and goals as of 13 March 2011 ‡ National team caps and goals as of 13 March 2011

Bojan Neziri (Serbian Cyrillic: Бојан Незири, born 26 February 1982) is a Serbian football defender who last played for FK Inđija in the Serbian SuperLiga.

== Career ==
Neziri played for FC Metalurh Donetsk starting in 2003, but was loaned to German team VfL Wolfsburg for one year in 2005. He began his career playing for FK Šabac but was forced to leave for neighbors FK Radnički Zorka after the first club went bankrupt. At 16 years old, he signed with the biggest club in the area, FK Mačva Šabac, and then for FK Vojvodina, one of the biggest clubs in Serbia. There Neziri established his place in the Under-21 Serbia and Montenegro squad.

He was part of the Serbian and Montenegrin 2004 Olympic football team, who exited in the first round, finishing fourth in Group C behind gold-medal winners Argentina, Australia and Tunisia. He earned three senior caps for Serbia and Montenegro.
