= Firma (supporter group) =

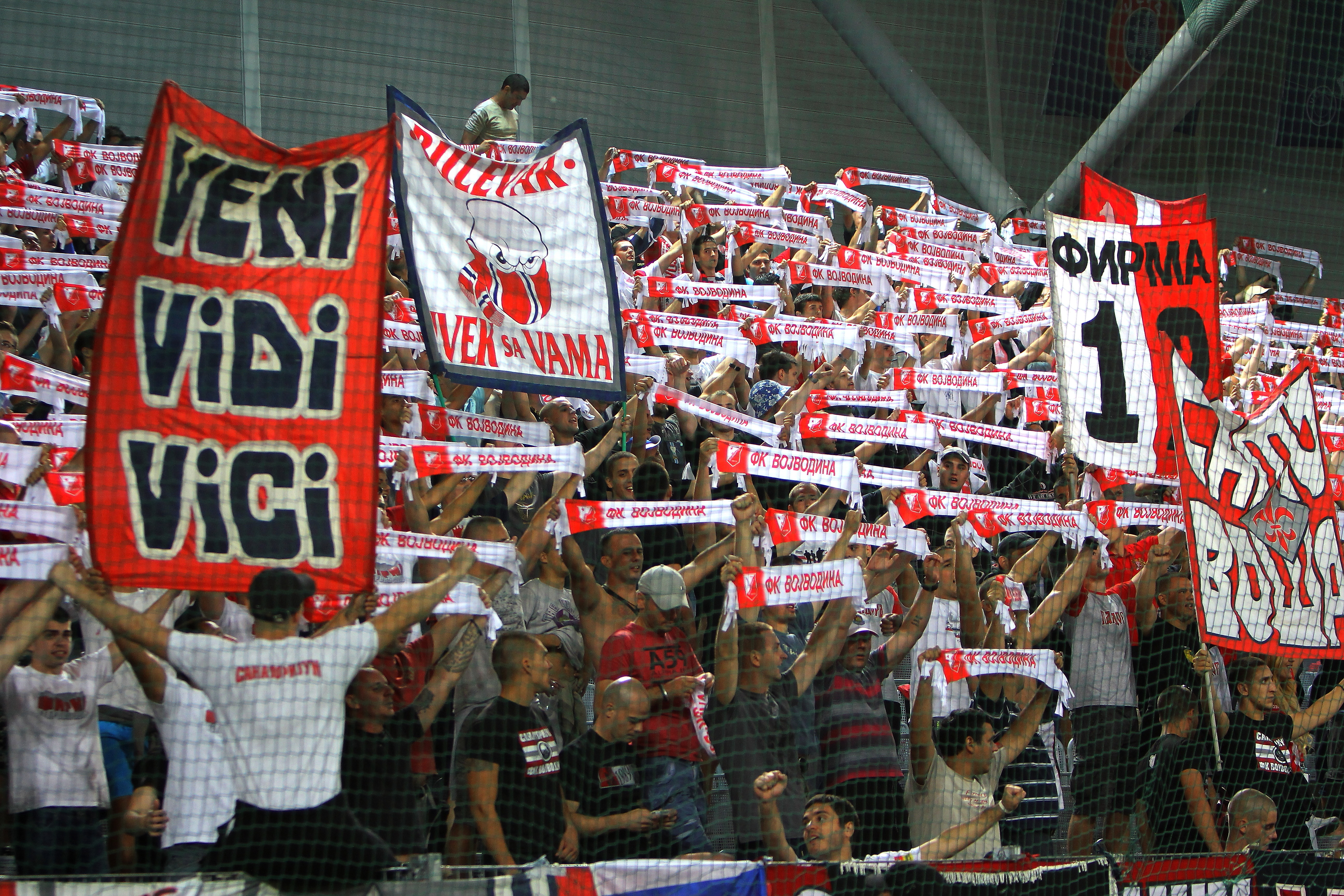
- The Firmaši during an UEFA Europa League away match in 2012
- Abbreviation: F89
- Founded: 12 March 1989; 37 years ago
- Type: Supporters' group, Ultras group
- Team: Vojvodina Novi Sad
- Motto: Yesterday, today, tomorrow, forever the Firm!
- Headquarters: Novi Sad, Vojvodina, Serbia
- Arenas: Karađorđe Stadium, SPENS Sports Center
- Stand: North
- Coordinates: 45°14′48″N 19°50′32″E
- Website: firma1989.com

Firma (Serbian Cyrillic: Фирма, English: The Firm) are the organised supporters of the professional football club Vojvodina Novi Sad, Vojvodina, Serbia. The members of Firma call themselves Firmaši (Serbian Cyrillic: Фирмаши), the plural of the singular form Firmaš, and they generally support all clubs within the Vojvodina Novi Sad Sports Society.

The Firma is consisted mainly of groups from the neighborhoods and suburbs of Novi Sad. In addition to the numerous groups, the Firma has also subgroups like: Bački Odred, G-3, Divizija, Freaks, Old Town Boys, Over Thirty, Pandora, Rajkersi, Red Firm, Sanatorijum, Sremski Front, UltraNS etc. Vojvodina has also a group of their oldest supporters, called the Stara Garda (English: Old Guard).

== History ==
=== Early years and the background ===
As one of the oldest football clubs in Serbia, Vojvodina always had considerable number of supporters. On 15 December 1937, the first organized supporters club was established for a better coordination and harmonization among the Vojvodina fans. It was probably the first organized supporter group in the former Yugoslavia. One of the first organized supports was recorded already on May the 3rd 1931, at the away game against Mačva Šabac. Vojvodina had about 150 supporters present, who arrived with 6 busses. In those years, several thousands fans attended Vojvodina matches in Osijek, Borovo and other cities. Trips to away games were organized usually by train, buses and even by steam boats. The supporters club was active until World War II, but during the war the Kingdom of Yugoslavia was invaded and partitioned by the Axis powers, and its northern parts, including Novi Sad, were annexed by Hungary. The local population were suppressed and many Serb and Jewish civilians were murdered (including women, children and the elderly), have perished in concentration camps or were expelled. But many citizens of all nationalities – mostly Serbs, but also some anti-fascist local Hungarians, Slovaks and others – joined the resistance and fought together against the occupation, including many Vojvodina fans. Especially bloody was the year 1942, when in a single sweep Hungarian Nazis killed over 4000 local Serbs, Jews and Roma. The most were killed during the Novi Sad massacre. At that time, many Vojvodina players, club officials and fans died. After the war the surviving Vojvodina fans have stayed true to their patriotic principles and attempted to re-establish the club. But instead the new communist rulers decided to merge Vojvodina into a new club called Sloga Novi Sad. This met a lot of resistance among the population and the supporters continued to call the club Vojvodina. After a long resistance by the supporters, the old name was returned.

=== 1950s and 1960s ===
During the 1950s and 1960s, the club had a large number of supporters, not only people from Novi Sad, but also people from other parts of Yugoslavia who regularly traveled to stadium. At that time, Vojvodina belonged to the clubs with the most supporters in the country. The gathering were organized in the downtown of the Novi Sad from there the supporters walked to the stadium or drove to away games. The fans traveled by buses, trains and cars to away games to Belgrade, Niš, Skoplje, Tuzla, Sarajevo, Mostar, Zagreb, Subotica and other cities but have never been in Croatian town Split (Hajduk). In 1966, about 4,000 Vojvodina fans visited the decisive away game about the Yugoslav championship against Dinamo Zagreb. In the following season Vojvodina achieved the largest attendance during a home match when they played in European Cup quarter-final against eventual champions Celtic Glasgow. There were about 30,000 enthusiastic Vojvodina fans.

=== 1970s and 1980s ===
In the 1970s, various transparents arrives the stands. One of the first was made in 1974, on which was written: "Supporters from Salajka" (Salajka is a neighborhood of Novi Sad). By the end of the 1970s and the beginning of the 1980s, the stadium were well attended and part of the crowd supported Vojvodina also on the away games. But in 1986, Vojvodina relegated to the second division and the support deteriorated and some fans started to avoid the stadium. But, at those days, the real Vojvodina supporters still remained. At the time a lot of smaller groups still existed, such as: "Tulips", "Red Crew", "Salajka", "Liman Boys", "Old Town Boys" etc.

=== Establishment during the late 1980s ===
In 1989, for the first time starts the idea of uniting of all the smaller supporter groups which previously existed. This idea is realized on 12 March 1989, and the group was named Red Firm. The name was originally proposed by a Vojvodina supporter, known by his nickname Šima, all because of West Ham United's Inter City Firm, where Inter City was replaced by red as the official color of Vojvodina. During the championship match against Dinamo Zagreb appeared for the first time the transparent Red Firm in front of 15,000 fans. A few days later, several youngsters established the group Firma (English: The Firm), because they wanted a Serbian name for their group. Since that time, they started the support as one of the subgroups at the stand. End of the season, Vojvodina played for the Yugoslav championship and this attracted much more fans into the stadium. One of the largest number of spectators were achieved at the match against Sloboda Tuzla with about 27,000 spectators, where also the championship were celebrated. The final whistle sparked off a huge celebration inside the stadium as well as a massive celebratory pitch invasion. The support during this season was legendary with constant cheering, chanting, flags were used, and hats, scarves and shirts were made. During the European Champions Cup in 1989, Vojvodina played against Honved Budapest. Several thousand fans drove to Budapest to help their team. The return game was prepared excellently (smoke bombs, papers, roles were used), but poor result took Vojvodina out of competition.

=== 1990s ===
Beginning of the 1990s the away games were attended in great numbers. The Vojvodina fans drove to Sarajevo, Banja Luka, Belgrade, Skopje, Split, Subotica, Podgorica (former Titograd), Zrenjanin and other cities. But the deterioration of the politic situation in Yugoslavia, the following wars (1991–1995), the inflation and the UN sanctions have hit the state and his population hard. Stagnation was present in all Yugoslav supporter groups and in the Red Firm as well. In 1992, the Red Firm fell apart. Some of the subgroups tried to persist and to reestablish the image of Red Firm. The most persistent and the most organized group among them was the Firma. The crisis of several years were overcome and a new beginning of support started. In 1994, decided a group of older fans of Vojvodina, better known by their nickname "Slaninari" (roughly translates: Bacon Boys), to form their own organized supporter group. The group was named Stara Garda (English: Old Guard). Immediately they started to collect voluntary contributions to finance the first flag of 10 meters which is still visible today. In 1998, Vojvodina played the UEFA Intertoto Cup final against Werder Bremen. In the second leg Vojvodina played in front of 16,000 enthusiastic spectators. The supporter created a choreography, used flags and other stuff to be used during support. Such an exciting atmosphere was not seen for a long time in Novi Sad. In the 1990s many fans visited also volleyball games. In 1996, when Sisley from Italy (then the champion of Europe) came to Novi Sad to play against OK Vojvodina, there were about 9,000-10,000 Vojvodina fans in the SPENS Sports Center hall, including about 3,000 Firmaši.

=== 2000s ===
In 2010, Vojvodina achieved the final of the Serbian Cup and about 2500-3000 Firmaši drove to Belgrade, where the final was played, to support their team. In 2011, Vojvodina achieved again the final of the Serbian Cup and this time traveled about 7000 Firmaši and Vojvodina fans to Belgrade. The trip were organized by about 60 buses and was one of the greatest away visits of Vojvodina supporters.

In the following season, Vojvodina started with the UEFA Europa League qualifiers against Liechtenstein representatives FC Vaduz. The first leg was played in Vaduz and UEFA Commissioner made a condemning report after the match with allegations that Vojvodina supporters, most precisely the Firma, were wearing Nazi-style clothing, that someone chanted the name of Italian fascist dictator Mussolini to confuse a FC Vaduz player with Italian origin and the displaying of a transparent with the abbreviation RFNS. The delegates interpreted the abbreviation as racism, fascism and national socialism. The club officials strongly refuted the accusations and the Firma made an official statement in which they denied the allegations. In their statement, the Firma claimed that there was a misinterpretation of the symbols displayed at the stadium. The symbol which was associated with Nazi symbology was the crossed hammers and is a heritage from the time of the establishment of the Red Firm, who took over the symbol from West Ham United's logo (see establishment and characteristics of the Firma). They also added that the abbreviation RFNS stands for Red Firm Novi Sad and that the chants related to Mussolini came from the western stand of the stadium, while the organized group who arrived from Serbia was located in the north one. Despite the efforts to refute the accusations from the club officials and Firma itself, although it is an image of West Ham United's logo and despite clearly historical prove, UEFA fined the club in 25.000 euros penalty. The decision met on incomprehension among the club officials and the Firmaši. Especially if one takes under consideration that during the World War II many Vojvodina players, club officials and fans died in battles against Nazism or were murdered (see early years and the background of the Firma). This is also a reason, why the Firmaši strongly refuted the accusations.

== Characteristics ==
The Firma does not consist of a certain group of people with a specific identity. In their ranks are assembled people from different social backgrounds, from ordinary workers to lawyers, students, painters and some others. Next to the logo of the Firma, the group has also few symbols. One of the most important are the Ljiljan/Perunika (Englisch: lily/iris), the crossed hammers and Rajke. The Ljiljan/Perunika is also used on Serbian coat of arms. With the Ljiljan the Firmaši shows their closeness to the homeland. The crossed hammers is a symbol of the labor movement and stands for the hard and honest work of the Firmaši. In addition, it is also a heritage from the time of the founding of the Red Firm. The supporter group took over the crossed hammers from West Ham United's logo. And Rajke, an artificial angry-looking bald-headed supporter. The name Rajke is a masculine given name of Serbian origin and comes from the Serbian word "raj" meaning "Paradise". According to him, a subgroup was named, called the Rajkersi or Rajkeri. A group which created especially graffitis and therefore also called Rajkers writers (RWS). The Firmaši wearing on matches mostly the official team products as well as the products based on the Firma. Their style of supporting includes the use of flags, choreography, chanting, displaying of banners and other stuff. They have mostly witty slogans, with a measure of taste, confuse by jokes, but not to insult really a rival fan group. The acoustic support is often coordinated by a so-called "Vodja" (Serbian: leader) by a megaphone and accompanied by drums. The Firmaši expressed often their love for their city, club and Serbia with many creative activities and humanitarian actions. They had been involved several times in a big blood donation for transfusions in Serbia's hospitals, last 2011. They also have anti-fascist tendencies, because during the World War II many Vojvodina players, club officials and fans died in battles against fascism or were murdered by Nazis soldiers, especially during the Novi Sad massacre.

== Friendships ==
The Firma are in a brotherhood with the organized fan group of Borac Banja Luka from Bosnia and Herzegovina, the Lešinari. They have this relationship since the 1989–90 season. It all began before the championship match between Vojvodina and Borac Banja Luka in Novi Sad. The Vojvodina supporters were especially hospitable to the supporter from Banja Luka. Before the match they also played football together, of course the Borac supporters have not forgotten this and return the hospitality as Vojvodina played in Banja Luka. They also made several graffities together which some even survived the Bosnian War (1992–1995) and are still visible on the walls of the city of Banja Luka. The outbreak of war in Bosnia and Herzegovina interrupted the cooperation of the two groups. The battlefields and other destinies removed many of the people who built the friendship. Many contacts were lost, but the friendship still remained. The first club from Serbia who played after the war in Banja Luka was Vojvodina. The new generation of supporters of both club renewed their friendship and it began a new era of cooperation. Their often mentioned slogan is: "i u bolu i u radosti braća do iznemoglosti", which roughly translates to "and in pain and in joy brothers to exhaustion." Today, there exist in both cities new graffitis, which bring the brotherhood for expression.

== Trivia ==
Like after the World War II, where the fans fought for the preservation of the club name, they also fought during the new millennium for the original stadium name. In 1924, the club founders named the stadium after Karađorđe, the leader of the First Serbian uprising against the Ottoman occupation. The stadium bore the name till the fascist occupation in April 1941, because the club was banned. After the war, the new communist government decided to rename the stadium in City Stadium, because Karađorđe remembered on the House of Karađorđević, a royal Serbian dynasty and descended from Karađorđe. In 1992, the stadium was renamed again and the new name was Vojvodina Stadium. The Firma was among the first who lobbied for the return of the original name, in order to honor the founders and to renew the tradition. In 2000, during the club assembly, the Stara Garda filed a formal request for the return of the original name. After long efforts and under pressure of the Firma, the stadium got after more than 65 years its original name again. Among the Vojvodina fans are also some fans who have gone to unusual lengths to attend important games. A Vojvodina supporter, known by his nickname Fale, pulled out a healthy tooth to have a reason to leave his job and to attend a match of Vojvodina. In 2007, an ultra magazine from Germany published an edition with an interview with the Firma.

== Firma today ==
The Firma puts weight on the importance that people support their club. Many of the younger generations from Novi Sad and its surrounding settlements accepted Vojvodina as their club and became to loyal followers. Today, the Firma have several thousand members and are one of top Serbian supporter groups. Well organized, the Firmaši always gather on the north stand of the Karađorđe Stadium, more known as ultras. However, they protected the name and honour of FK Vojvodina, Novi Sad and Serbia, putting themselves against all who were not doing enough for the club. Besides football, they also support other sport sections of the Vojvodina Novi Sad Sport Association, like the basketball club KK Vojvodina, the handball club RK Vojvodina, the volleyball club OK Vojvodina and the water polo club VK Vojvodina. The goal of the Firma is to try to lead the club and the supporter group to encourage their old supporters to come back to the terrace and to motivate younger generations as well.
