= Rajko Aleksić =

Yugoslav and Serbian footballer

Personal information
- Full name: Rajko Aleksić
- Date of birth: 19 February 1947 (age 79)
- Place of birth: Srpska Crnja, FPR Yugoslavia
- Height: 1.82 m (6 ft 0 in)
- Position: Defender

Senior career*
Years	Team	Apps	(Gls)
1965–1977	Vojvodina	214	(3)
1977–1979	Lyon	52	(2)
Total		266	(5)

International career
1968	Yugoslavia	2	(0)
Medal record
Silver medal – second place	UEFA European Championship	1968
- * Club domestic league appearances and goals

Rajko Aleksić (Serbian Cyrillic: Рајко Алексић; born 19 February 1947) is a former Yugoslav and Serbian footballer who played as a defender.

== Career ==
During his active years, Aleksić played for Vojvodina in Yugoslavia (1965–1977) and Lyon in France (1977–1979), winning the Yugoslav First League in his debut season.

At international level, Aleksić was capped twice for Yugoslavia in 1968. He was also a non-playing member of the team at UEFA Euro 1968, as Yugoslavia lost in the final to Italy.

== Honours ==
=== Club ===
Vojvodina

- Yugoslav First League: 1965–66

=== International ===
Yugoslavia

- UEFA European Championship: Runner-up 1968
