= Đorđe Vujkov =

Yugoslav and Serbian footballer

Personal information
- Full name: Đorđe Vujkov
- Date of birth: 19 August 1955 (age 71)
- Place of birth: Titel, PR Serbia, FPR Yugoslavia
- Height: 1.79 m (5 ft 10 in)
- Position: Defender

Youth career
- Sloga Lok
- Novi Sad
- 1971–1973: Vojvodina

Senior career*
Years	Team	Apps	(Gls)
1973–1983	Vojvodina	234	(8)
1983–1986	Lokeren	60	(1)
1986–1988	Castellón	71	(1)
1988–1990	Alpine Donawitz	66	(2)
Total		431	(12)

International career
1974	Yugoslavia U18	5	(0)
1977–1978	Yugoslavia U21	6	(0)
1977	Yugoslavia	4	(0)
Medal record
Gold medal – first place	UEFA Under-21 Championship	1978
Silver medal – second place	UEFA Under-18 Championship	1974
- * Club domestic league appearances and goals

Đorđe Vujkov (Serbian Cyrillic: Ђорђе Вујков; born 19 August 1955) is a former Yugoslav and Serbian professional footballer who played as a defender.

== Club career ==
Vujkov spent 10 seasons with Vojvodina from 1973 to 1983, winning the Mitropa Cup in 1976–77. He later played abroad in Belgium (Lokeren), Spain (Castellón), and Austria (DSV Alpine).

== International career ==
In 1977, Vujkov was capped four times for Yugoslavia at full level. He was also a member of the under-21 team that won the UEFA Under-21 Championship in 1978. His final international was an October 1977 friendly match away against Hungary.

== Honours ==
Vojvodina

- Mitropa Cup: 1976–77

Yugoslavia U21

- UEFA Under-21 Championship: 1978

Yugoslavia U18

- UEFA Under-18 Championship runner-up: 1974
