= Otto Hamacek =

Austrian footballer and coach

Personal information
- Full name: Otto Hamacek
- Date of birth: 1 October 1896
- Place of birth: Vienna, Austro-Hungary
- Date of death: 26 March 1984 (aged 87)
- Position: Midfielder

Senior career*
Years	Team	Apps	(Gls)
1919–1924	Rapid Wien	1	(0)

Managerial career
- 1929: Luzern
- 1930–1932: Vojvodina
- * Club domestic league appearances and goals

Otto Hamacek (1 October 1896 – 26 March 1984) was an Austrian football player and coach.

As player he was a midfielder and played with SK Rapid Wien in the 1923–24 Austrian championship. He played for the Vienna selection team in 1919 representing Rapid.

Later he became a coach and managed Swiss top-flight side FC Luzern between February and summer 1929 and Yugoslav side SK Vojvodina from 1930 to 1932.
