= Otto Neczas =

Austrian footballer and coach

Personal information
- Full name: Otto Neczas
- Date of birth: 20 October 1894
- Place of birth: Vienna, Austro-Hungary
- Date of death: 4 November 1940 (aged 46)
- Place of death: Vienna
- Position: Forward

Senior career*
Years	Team	Apps	(Gls)
1913–1914	1. Simmeringer SC	1	(0)
1915–1925	SC Rudolfshügel	102	(76)
1918	→ ASV Hertha Wien	2	(0)

Managerial career
- 1925–1926: Soko Belgrade
- 1926–1928: Vojvodina
- 1929–1930: Vojvodina
- 1930–1931: FC Metz
- * Club domestic league appearances and goals

Otto Neczas (20 October 1894 – 4 November 1940) was an Austrian football player and coach.

As player he was a striker and became a prolific goalscorer during the 1910s. He played with 1. Simmeringer SC in the 1913/14 season. Then he played with SC Rudolfshügel between 1915 and 1925. In the 1917–18 Austrian championship he ended up the season as the second league top-scorer with 14 goals. Besides SC Rudolfshügel, he played in another Austrian top-flight club, ASV Hertha Wien, in the season 1918–19 Austrian championship.

In 1917 he played for the team of Lower-Austria against Bohemia. In 1918 he played for the Vienna selection against Kraków.

Later he became a coach and managed Yugoslav side FK Vojvodina on two occasions 1926 and 1930. Before coming to Vojvodina he coached for a brief period SK Soko a club from the Yugoslav capital Belgrade.

He died on 4 November and was buried on 8 November at Vienna Central Cemetery.

== Seasons ==
League statistics:

- 1913/14: 1. Simmeringer SC league statistics 1913/14 at austriasoccer.at
- 1915/16: SC Rudolfshügel league statistics 1915/16 at austriasoccer.at - He was 3rd league topscorer with 19 goals.
- 1916/17: SC Rudolfshügel league statistics 1916/17 at austriasoccer.at - He was a 3rd league topscorer with 16 goals.
- 1917/18: SC Rudolfshügel league statistics 1917/18 at austriasoccer.at - He was 2nd league topscorer with 14 goals.
- 1918/19: Hertha Wien league statistics 1918/19 at austriasoccer.at
- 1918/19: SC Rudolfshügel league statistics 1918/19 at austriasoccer.at
- 1919/20: SC Rudolfshügel league statistics 1919/20 at austriasoccer.at
- 1920/21: SC Rudolfshügel league statistics 1920/21 at austriasoccer.at
- 1921/22: SC Rudolfshügel league statistics 1921/22 at austriasoccer.at
- 1922/23: SC Rudolfshügel league statistics 1922/23 at austriasoccer.at
- 1923/24: missing
- 1924/25: SC Rudolfshügel league statistics 1924/25 at austriasoccer.at
