= Jovan Kovrlija =

Yugoslav and Serbian football manager and player (1942–2019)

Personal information
- Date of birth: 20 January 1942
- Place of birth: Bosansko Grahovo, Independent State of Croatia
- Date of death: 24 August 2019 (aged 77)
- Place of death: Novi Sad, Serbia
- Position: Defender

Youth career
- Polet Nakovo

Senior career*
Years	Team	Apps	(Gls)
1964–1974	Proleter Zrenjanin	268	(24)

International career
1971–1972	Yugoslavia Olympic	4	(0)

Managerial career
- 1984: Vojvodina
- 1987–1988: Vrbas
- 1989: Vojvodina (caretaker)
- 1990–1991: Bečej
- 1991–1992: Vojvodina
- 1993: Pierikos
- 1995–1997: Zemun
- 1997–1999: Bečej
- 2001: Mladost Lučani
- 2002: Mladost Lučani
- 2003–2004: Budućnost Banatski Dvor
- * Club domestic league appearances and goals

Jovan Kovrlija (Serbian Cyrillic: Јован Коврлија; 20 January 1942 – 24 August 2019) was a Yugoslav and Serbian football manager and player.

== Club career ==
Born in Bosansko Grahovo, Kovrlija joined Yugoslav Second League side Proleter Zrenjanin in 1964, spending the rest of his playing career with the club. He helped them win promotion to the Yugoslav First League on two occasions, in 1967 and 1973.

== International career ==
At international level, Kovrlija played for the Yugoslavia Olympic team during its unsuccessful qualification campaign for 1972 Summer Olympics.

== Managerial career ==
After hanging up his boots, Kovrlija was manager of numerous clubs, most notably Vojvodina and Zemun. He also served as manager of Mladost Lučani and Budućnost Banatski Dvor in the First League of FR Yugoslavia/Serbia and Montenegro.

== Career statistics ==
Appearances and goals by club, season and competition
Club	Season	League		
Club	Season	Division	Apps	Goals
Proleter Zrenjanin	1964–65	Yugoslav Second League	22	9
Proleter Zrenjanin	1965–66	Yugoslav Second League	31	3
Proleter Zrenjanin	1966–67	Yugoslav Second League	11	3
Proleter Zrenjanin	1967–68	Yugoslav First League	21	1
Proleter Zrenjanin	1968–69	Yugoslav First League	30	0
Proleter Zrenjanin	1969–70	Yugoslav Second League	29	1
Proleter Zrenjanin	1970–71	Yugoslav Second League	30	0
Proleter Zrenjanin	1971–72	Yugoslav Second League	30	2
Proleter Zrenjanin	1972–73	Yugoslav Second League	32	3
Proleter Zrenjanin	1973–74	Yugoslav First League	27	2
Proleter Zrenjanin	1974–75	Yugoslav First League	5	0
Proleter Zrenjanin	Total		268	24

== Honours ==
Proleter Zrenjanin

- Yugoslav Second League: 1966–67 (Group East), 1970–71 (Group North)
