= Fritz Levitus =

Austrian footballer and coach

Personal information
- Full name: Fritz Levitus
- Place of birth: Austro-Hungary
- Position: Midfielder

Senior career*
Years	Team	Apps	(Gls)
1915–1917	Wiener AF	18	(1)
1921–1923	Hakoah Vienna	5	(0)

Managerial career
- 1936–1938: Vojvodina
- 19xx–19xx: Maccabi Brno
- * Club domestic league appearances and goals

Fritz Levitus or Löwitus, was an Austrian football player and coach.

He played in the Austrian championship first with Wiener AF in the seasons 1915, 1915–16 and 1916–17, and then with Hakoah Wien in the seasons 1921–22 and 1922–23.

Later he became a coach and managed Yugoslav club FK Vojvodina between 1936 and 1938. He also coached Maccabi Brno in Czechoslovakia.
