= Žarko Nikolić =

Yugoslav and Serbian footballer

Personal information
- Date of birth: 16 October 1936
- Place of birth: Novi Sad, Kingdom of Yugoslavia
- Date of death: 22 August 2011 (aged 74)
- Place of death: Novi Sad, Serbia
- Position: Defender

Youth career
- 1952–1954: Vojvodina

Senior career*
Years	Team	Apps	(Gls)
1954–1966	Vojvodina	226	(12)
1966–1968	Schalke 04	11	(0)
1968	Vojvodina	1	(0)
Total		238	(12)

International career
1959–1961	Yugoslavia	9	(0)

Managerial career
- 1974: Sloga Kraljevo
Medal record
Gold medal – first place	Olympic Games	1960
Silver medal – second place	European Nations' Cup	1960
- * Club domestic league appearances and goals

Žarko Nikolić (Serbian Cyrillic: Жарко Николић; 16 October 1936 – 22 August 2011) was a Yugoslav and Serbian footballer who played as a defender.

== Career ==
Born in Novi Sad, Nikolić played for Vojvodina from 1954 to 1966, amassing over 200 appearances in the Yugoslav First League and helping them win the championship in the 1965–66 season. He subsequently moved abroad to West Germany and joined Schalke 04, spending two seasons at the club. Before retiring from the game, Nikolić had a brief second spell with Vojvodina.

At international level, Nikolić was capped nine times for Yugoslavia. He represented his country at one European Nations' Cup (finishing runner-up in 1960) and one World Cup (1962). Nikolić was also a member of the team that won the gold medal at the 1960 Summer Olympics, but he did not play in any matches.

== Honours ==
=== Club ===
Vojvodina

- Yugoslav First League: 1965–66

=== International ===
Yugoslavia

- Olympic Games: 1960
- European Nations' Cup: Runner-up 1960
