= Ratomir Čabrić =

Yugoslav football manager and player

Personal information
- Date of birth: 19 September 1918
- Place of birth: Varvarin, Kingdom of Serbia
- Date of death: 13 April 1990 (aged 71)
- Place of death: Belgrade, SR Serbia, SFR Yugoslavia
- Position: Forward

Senior career*
Years	Team	Apps	(Gls)
1936–1939	BASK	51	(23)
1950	Metalac Beograd	10	(6)
1951	Odred Ljubljana	3	(0)

International career
1938	Yugoslavia	1	(0)

Managerial career
- 1954: Rijeka
- 1955–1959: Velež Mostar
- 1959–1960: Vojvodina
- 1960–1961: Velež Mostar
- 1961–1963: Sarajevo
- 1963–1964: Proleter Zrenjanin
- 1964–1965: Iraklis Thessaloniki
- 1967–1968: Radnički Niš
- 1968–1970: Vojvodina
- 1970–1971: Osijek
- 1972–1973: Napredak Kruševac
- * Club domestic league appearances and goals

Ratomir Čabrić (Serbian Cyrillic: Ратомир Чабрић; 19 September 1918 – 13 April 1990) was a Yugoslav football manager and player.

== Club career ==
Čabrić played as a forward with BASK in the Yugoslav State Championship for three seasons during the late 1930s. He also played for Metalac Beograd (First League) and Odred Ljubljana (Second League) at the beginning of the 1950s.

== International career ==
At international level, Čabrić was capped once for Yugoslavia in 1938.

== Managerial career ==
After hanging up his boots, Čabrić was manager of several clubs in the Yugoslav First League, including two spells at both Velež Mostar and Vojvodina. He also spent some time in charge of Greek side Iraklis Thessaloniki during the 1960s.
