= 1965–66 Yugoslav First League =

Prva savezna liga
- Season: 1965–66
- Dates: 15 August 1965 – 19 June 1966
- Champions: Vojvodina (1st title)
- Relegated: Radnički Belgrade; Trešnjevka
- European Cup: Vojvodina
- Cup Winners' Cup: OFK Belgrade
- Inter-Cities Fairs Cup: Dinamo Zagreb; Red Star Belgrade; Olimpija Ljubljana
- Top goalscorer: Petar Nadoveza (21)

The 1965–66 Yugoslav First League season was the 20th season of the First Federal League (Serbo-Croatian: Prva savezna liga), the top level association football league of SFR Yugoslavia, since its establishment in 1946. Sixteen teams contested the competition, with Vojvodina winning their first national title.

== Revelation of match-fixing from May–June 1964 ("Planinić affair") ==
Though the events under scrutiny had taken place fourteen months earlier, the beginning of the 1965-66 Yugoslav First League season and subsequently the rest of the campaign were marked by revelations of match fixing from May and June 1964, during the concluding weeks of the 1963-64 season.

In late August 1965, two weeks into the new league season, FK Željezničar, Hajduk Split, and NK Trešnjevka were found guilty of fixing matches from two seasons earlier at the end of the 1963–64 season. Their guilt was based on a written statement by the Željo goalkeeper Ranko Planinić who decided to come forward some 14 months after the fact. In his statement, Planinić claims on the record that his club threw matches against Hajduk and Trešnjevka towards the end of the 1963-64 season in return for financial compensation that those two relegation-threatened teams paid in order to avoid the drop. Specifically, Planinić claims that the match played on 31 May 1964 in Split when Hajduk beat Željezničar 4-0 was fixed, as well as the match on 7 June 1964 in Sarajevo when Željo and Trešnjevka tied 3-3. He was in Željo's goal for both matches.

Planinić made the information public in August 1965 by approaching the Večernje novine journalist Alija Resulović who in turn took Planinić's testimony in form of an interview and the piece was published by the paper, circulated in 100,000 copies at the time. In his 2006 book Ona vremena, Resulović claims to have contacted FK Željezničar's president Nusret Mahić right before submitting the piece for print, informing him of Planinić's allegations, seeking comment, and even offering to sit on the information if he (Mahić) thinks it necessary. Resulović further claims that Mahić's response was: "Publish it all! It's all a lie that Planinić concocted as revenge for being fined for an incident he caused at a training session".

The explosive testimony immediately erupted in a nationwide scandal that became known as the 'Planinić Affair'. Yugoslav First League had been plagued by rumours of widespread match-fixing on multiple occasions over the preceding decade, however, this was the first occasion that a player came forward and substantiated those claims on the record.

=== Punishment ===
On Friday, 27 August 1965, following a fifteen-hour investigative process, the Yugoslav FA's (FSJ) disciplinary body (disciplinski sud) presided over by Svetozar Savić handed out the following penalties:

- FK Željezničar's board members, including club president Nusret Mahić, got lifelong bans on performing any football-related official functions.
- FK Željezničar's head coach at the time Vlatko Konjevod got a lifetime ban from football.
- FK Željezničar's players Ivica Osim and Mišo Smajlović each got a one-year ban from football.
- NK Hajduk Split's board members, including club president Josip Košto, got lifelong bans on performing any football-related official functions.
- NK Hajduk Split's head coach at the time Milovan Ćirić got a lifetime ban from football.
- Two members of NK Trešnjevka's board got lifelong bans on performing any football-related official functions.
- NK Trešnjevka's club president Ivan Bačun and technical director Marjan Matančić got disciplinary motions started against them.
- NK Dinamo Zagreb's general secretary Oto Hofman got a lifetime ban from football for acting as a go-between for Željezničar and Trešnjevka.

Disciplinary body president Svetozar Savić also announced that the investigation had revealed that Željezničar was paid YUD1.5 million by Hajduk Split, and YUD4 million by Trešnjevka for these matches. Some of the money Trešnjevka paid was obtained from the Zagreb Fair where some of Trešnjevka's board members were employed at. As a reference point, the price of a daily newspaper at the time was YUD40.

Furthermore, NK Hajduk Split, NK Trešnjevka, and FK Željezničar were relegated to the Yugoslav Second League's Western Division, effective immediately. The decision further entailed reorganization of the 1965–66 Yugoslav First League that was already two weeks into its run via reducing the number of clubs from 16 to 13 and voiding all the 1965-66 Yugoslav First League matches played by Hajduk, Trešnjevka, and Željezničar up to that point (6 matches in total). It also meant expanding the 1965–66 Yugoslav Second League Western Division from 18 to 21 clubs.

The draconian punishment caused widespread shock and approval among the Yugoslav public with each of the FSJ's six sub-federations except for SR Croatia's expressing strong support of the decision. Fans of Hajduk, Trešnjevka, and Željezničar organized street protests in their respective cities with the Split demonstration being the most attended. The three clubs quickly lodged an appeal with the FSJ.

=== Appeals ===
On Friday, 9 September 1965, the Yugoslav FA's appeals commission announced its decisions. The main punishment for the three clubs was reduced to points-deduction. Željo, Hajduk, and Trešnjevka were docked 6, 5, and 5 points, respectively.

All of the individual punishments for players and club management members were upheld.

=== Aftermath ===
As a result of having 6 points docked in addition to missing two of their best players for most of the 1965–66 season, Željezničar spent the majority of the league campaign in a desperate fight for league survival. Towards the end of the season, for the deciding league matches in Željo's battle to avoid relegation, the FSJ decided to lift the Željo star player Ivica Osim's ban ahead of its expiration. In the second last week of the season, on 12 June 1966, Osim's goal at Radnički Niš in a 0–1 away win in Niš effectively kept Željo in the First League.

Over the decades since, Planinić's motivation to become a whistleblower has been aggressively questioned by journalists close to the punished clubs. After he blew the whistle, the tone and framing of press write-ups referencing Planinić in various Sarajevo and Split-based print media outlets ranged from dismissing his claims outright to insults, insinuations and speculation about his decision to come forward being made out of spite, hurt ego, or personal vendetta against his club because supposedly his summer 1965 off-season contract negotiations with FK Željezničar stalled or because he had lost the starting position in Željezničar's goal to teammate Vasilije Radović.

== League table ==
Pos	Team	Pld	W	D	L	GF	GA	GD	Pts	Qualification or relegation
1	Vojvodina (C)	30	17	9	4	53	28	+25	43	Qualification for European Cup first round
2	Dinamo Zagreb	30	13	9	8	49	35	+14	35	Invitation for Inter-Cities Fairs Cup first round
3	Velež	30	14	7	9	48	37	+11	35	
4	Rijeka	30	14	5	11	46	40	+6	33	
5	Red Star Belgrade	30	12	7	11	54	54	0	31	Invitation for Inter-Cities Fairs Cup first round
6	OFK Belgrade	30	10	10	10	58	50	+8	30	Qualification for Cup Winners' Cup first round
7	Radnički Niš	30	10	9	11	44	35	+9	29	
8	Olimpija	30	11	7	12	43	47	−4	29	Invitation for Inter-Cities Fairs Cup first round
9	Sarajevo	30	10	9	11	40	44	−4	29	
10	Vardar	30	12	4	14	47	44	+3	28	
11	Partizan	30	10	8	12	45	47	−2	28	
12	Željezničar (Note: Željezničar were docked 6 points due to Planinić Affair.)	30	12	8	10	35	36	−1	26	
13	Hajduk Split (Note: Hajduk Split were docked 5 points due to Planinić Affair.)	30	11	8	11	45	37	+8	25	
14	NK Zagreb	30	9	7	14	39	58	−19	25	
15	Radnički Beograd (R)	30	7	11	12	32	53	−21	25	Relegation to Yugoslav Second League
16	Trešnjevka (Note: Trešnjevka were docked 5 points due to Planinić Affair.) (R)	30	6	6	18	41	74	−33	13	Relegation to Yugoslav Second League

Source: rsssf.org
Rules for classification: 1) points; 2) goal difference; 3) number of goals scored.
(C) Champions; (R) Relegated

== Results ==
Home \ Away	DIN	HAJ	OFK	OLI	PAR	RBE	RNI	RSB	RIJ	SAR	VAR	VEL	VOJ	TRE	ZAG	ŽEL
Dinamo Zagreb		1–1	1–0	3–3	1–1	1–2	1–0	6–0	4–0	1–0	1–0	0–0	0–2	6–4	1–1	3–0
Hajduk Split	0–1		2–0	1–0	4–2	2–0	1–0	1–0	4–0	1–0	1–1	3–3	0–0	5–0	1–0	6–2
OFK Belgrade	2–2	2–2		2–0	4–5	4–1	0–1	2–1	3–0	5–1	1–1	1–1	3–4	3–3	4–1	0–2
Olimpija	0–1	2–1	1–3		3–0	1–1	0–0	3–3	4–1	3–1	1–0	3–0	0–6	5–1	0–1	1–0
Partizan	2–0	1–1	0–2	1–2		1–1	2–0	1–2	3–1	1–0	5–4	2–3	2–3	1–1	3–0	2–0
Radnički Beograd	1–0	0–0	4–4	1–0	1–1		2–4	2–2	0–2	2–2	3–1	0–2	1–3	1–0	1–0	0–2
Radnički Niš	2–2	2–1	4–1	5–2	0–0	0–1		0–0	1–0	1–2	2–1	4–2	0–1	6–1	4–0	1–1
Red Star	4–3	2–2	1–2	2–3	2–1	1–1	1–1		1–2	4–0	2–0	2–6	2–3	2–1	4–1	1–1
Rijeka	1–0	2–0	2–2	1–0	0–1	0–0	2–0	4–0		1–1	1–1	1–0	3–1	5–2	3–0	1–2
Sarajevo	2–0	3–2	1–0	4–1	1–3	0–0	2–2	2–5	0–0		3–2	2–1	2–1	4–0	3–1	0–0
Vardar	1–3	2–1	2–0	1–2	2–2	3–0	1–0	2–0	2–1	2–1		1–0	2–0	5–0	5–4	2–1
Velež	2–1	2–1	4–2	0–0	0–0	2–0	2–0	1–2	2–1	1–0	2–1		0–0	1–1	3–1	2–0
Vojvodina	0–0	1–0	0–0	1–1	1–0	6–1	1–1	1–2	4–1	1–0	2–0	2–1		3–2	0–0	2–2
Trešnjevka	1–2	3–0	1–1	1–1	3–0	4–1	2–1	0–3	2–6	1–1	1–0	1–3	0–1		1–2	2–0
NK Zagreb	2–3	4–1	1–4	2–1	2–1	3–3	2–2	0–2	0–2	1–1	3–2	3–1	1–1	2–1		1–0
Željezničar	1–1	1–0	1–1	3–0	3–1	2–1	1–0	2–1	0–2	1–1	1–0	2–1	1–2	3–1	0–0	

Source: DataSoccer.it
Legend: Blue = home team win; Yellow = draw; Red = away team win.

== Winning squad ==
Champions:

- FK VOJVODINA (coach: Branko Stanković)

players (league matches/league goals):

- Silvester Takač (30/13)
- Vasa Pušibrk (30/2)
- Ilija Pantelić (30/0) -goalkeeper-
- Vladimir Savić (29/5)
- Žarko Nikolić (29/4)
- Ivica Brzić (29/0)
- Stevan Sekereš (29/0)
- Dobrivoje Trivić (28/7)
- Mladen Vučinić (26/0)
- Đorđe Pavlić (18/8)
- Stevan Nestički (17/0)
- Dimitrije Radović (16/1)
- Radivoj Radosav (12/4)
- Adolf Lambi (8/2)
- Veljko Aleksić (4/0)
- Đorđe Milić (3/1)
- Tonče Stamevski (3/0)
- Rajko Aleksić (2/0)
- Branislav Veljković (1/0)-goalkeeper-
- Anđelko Marinković (1/0)
- Dragan Surdučki (1/0)

== Top scorers ==
Rank	Player	Club	Goals
1	(Socialist Federal Republic of Yugoslavia) Petar Nadoveza	Hajduk Split	21
2	(Socialist Federal Republic of Yugoslavia) Slobodan Santrač	OFK Belgrade	20
3	(Socialist Federal Republic of Yugoslavia) Slaven Zambata	Dinamo Zagreb	19
4	(Socialist Federal Republic of Yugoslavia) Bora Kostić	Red Star	14
4	(Socialist Federal Republic of Yugoslavia) Mustafa Hasanagić	Partizan	14
6	(Socialist Federal Republic of Yugoslavia) Silvester Takač	Vojvodina	13
6	(Socialist Federal Republic of Yugoslavia) Milorad Janković	Radnički Niš	13

== See also ==
- 1965–66 Yugoslav Second League
- 1965–66 Yugoslav Cup
