= Stevan Sekereš =

Serbian association football player

Personal information
- Date of birth: 26 September 1937
- Place of birth: Mirkovac, Kingdom of Yugoslavia
- Date of death: 23 November 2012 (aged 75)
- Place of death: Novi Sad, Serbia
- Position: Defender

Senior career*
Years	Team	Apps	(Gls)
1955–1957	Šparta Beli Manastir		
1957–1958	Proleter Osijek		
1958–1967	Vojvodina	169	(12)
1967–1968	Nantes	17	(1)

International career
1966	Yugoslavia	7	(0)
- * Club domestic league appearances and goals

Stevan Sekereš (26 September 1937 – 23 November 2012) was a Serbian football defender who played for SFR Yugoslavia.

He had a spell in France, with Nantes.

== International career ==
Sekereš made his debut for Yugoslavia in a May 1966 friendly match against Hungary and earned a total of 7 caps (no goals). He won his final cap in October that same year in another friendly, against Czechoslovakia.
