= Miroslav Ćurčić =

Serbian footballer (1962–2017)

Personal information
- Date of birth: 22 March 1962
- Place of birth: Melenci, SFR Yugoslavia
- Date of death: 10 August 2017 (aged 55)
- Place of death: Würzburg, Germany
- Position: Forward

Senior career*
Years	Team	Apps	(Gls)
1982–1984	Novi Sad	40	(12)
1984–1988	Vojvodina	119	(45)
1989–1990	FC Antwerp	6	(1)
1990–1991	Farense	34	(12)
1991–1993	Belenenses	30	(5)
1993–1994	Estoril-Praia	17	(1)
1994–1995	Farense	5	(0)
1996	SG Egelsbach	9	(0)

Managerial career
- Bečej
- 2004: Vojvodina (caretaker)
- Kabel
- * Club domestic league appearances and goals

Miroslav Ćurčić (Serbian Cyrillic: Мирослав Ћурчић; 22 March 1962 – 10 August 2017) was a Serbian footballer who played as a forward.

== Career ==
Born in Melenci, Ćurčić played for FK Novi Sad in the Yugoslav Second League, FK Vojvodina in the Yugoslav First League, Royal Antwerp FC in the Belgian First Division, Farense, Belenenses and Estoril in the Portuguese Liga and SG Egelsbach in the German lower leagues. He scored 45 goals in 119 games for Vojvodina.

== Personal life ==
Ćurčić died on 10 August 2017 of cancer in Würzburg, Germany.
