= Marko Savić (footballer) =

Serbian footballer and coach

Personal information
- Date of birth: 19 July 1984 (age 42)
- Place of birth: Belgrade, SFR Yugoslavia
- Height: 1.75 m (5 ft 9 in)
- Position: Forward

Team information
- Current team: Vojvodina (manager)

Senior career*
Years	Team	Apps	(Gls)
2002–2003	Grafičar Beograd		
2003–2004	Žarkovo		
2004–2005	Mladi Obilić	6	(1)
2005–2006	Sarajevo	0	(0)
2006–2007	Rilski Sportist		
2007–2009	Spartak Varna	4	(0)
2009	Radnički Obrenovac		

Managerial career
- 2019–2021: Voždovac (youth)
- 2021–2022: FCI Levadia
- 2023–2024: Voždovac
- 2024: Železničar Pančevo
- 2024–2025: Čukarički
- 2026–: Vojvodina
- * Club domestic league appearances and goals

Marko Savić (Serbian Cyrillic: Марко Савић; born 19 July 1984) is a Serbian professional football coach and former player. He is the current manager of Vojvodina.

He played for some minor Serbian clubs, Grafičar Beograd, Žarkovo and Mladi Obilić before moving to Bosnia to play with FK Sarajevo. Between 2006 and 2009 he played in Bulgaria, first with FC Rilski Sportist Samokov in 2006-07, and later with Spartak Varna between 2007 and 2009. In summer 2009, he returned to Serbia and signed with former top league club FK Radnički Obrenovac.

== Managerial statistics ==
As of 22 November 2026

Managerial record by team and tenure
Team	From	To	Record				
Team	From	To	G	W	D	L	Win %
FCI Levadia	1 January 2021	7 July 2022	30	26	2	2	86.67
Voždovac	6 June 2023	1 February 2024	21	9	7	5	42.86
Železničar	6 June 2024	6 November 2024	15	5	1	9	33.33
Čukarički	2 December 2024	8 April 2025	14	4	3	7	28.57
Vojvodina	25 July 2026	Present	16	10	2	4	62.50
Career total			95	56	13	26	58.95

== Honours ==
Individual

- Meistriliiga Manager of the Month: June/July 2021, May 2022
