= Dragoljub Milošević =

Serbian football manager (1929–2005)

Personal information
- Date of birth: 8 November 1929
- Place of birth: Valjevo, Kingdom of Yugoslavia
- Date of death: 2 October 2005 (aged 75)
- Place of death: Pančevo, Serbia and Montenegro

Youth career
- 1943: VSK
- 1945–1946: OFK Napred

Senior career*
| Years | Team | Apps | (Gls) |
| 1947–1948 | Budućnost Valjevo | | |
| 1948–1949 | Jedinstvo Zemun | | |
| 1949–1952 | Red Star Belgrade | | |
| 1952–1958 | Budućnost Valjevo | | |
| 1958–1960 | Mačva Šabac | | |
| 1960–1962 | Metalac Valjevo | | |

Managerial career
- 1957–1958: Budućnost Valjevo
- 1960–1964: Metalac Valjevo
- 1965–1966: Radnički Niš
- 1966–1968: Sloboda Titovo Užice
- 1969–1970: Sutjeska Nikšić
- 1970–1973: Vojvodina
- 1973–1974: Čelik Zenica
- 1975: Valencia
- 1976–1977: Olimpija Ljubljana
- 1977–1978: Budućnost Titograd
- 1978–1979: Napredak Kruševac
- 1980–1983: Cádiz
- 1984–1986: Tenerife
- 1987: Cádiz
- * Club domestic league appearances and goals

Dragoljub Milošević (8 November 1929 – 2 October 2005) was a Serbian footballer and football manager.

He played for VSK, OFK Napred, Budućnost Valjevo, Jedinstvo Zemun, Red Star Belgrade, Mačva Šabac and Metalac Valjevo.

He coached Budućnost Valjevo, Metalac Valjevo, Radnički Niš, Sloboda Titovo Užice, Vojvodina, Čelik Zenica, Valencia CF, Olimpija Ljubljana, Budućnost Titograd, Napredak Kruševac, Cádiz CF and CD Tenerife.
