= 1957 Mitropa Cup =

Tournament details
- Dates: 30 June – 4 August 1957
- Teams: 8

Final positions
- Champions: (Hungary) Vasas (2nd title)
- Runners-up: (Socialist Federal Republic of Yugoslavia) Vojvodina

Tournament statistics
- Matches played: 16
- Goals scored: 55 (3.44 per match)

The 1957 Mitropa Cup was the 17th season of the Mitropa football club tournament. It was won by Vasas who beat Vojvodina in the two-legged final 5–2 on aggregate.

== Quarter-finals ==
Matches played between 29 June and 7 July 1957. Play-offs took place on 10 and 11 July.

Team 1	Agg.	Team 2	1st leg	2nd leg	Play-off
Vasas (Hungary)	4–2	(Austria) First Vienna	3–0	1–2	
Rapid Wien (Austria)	4–4	(Hungary) MTK Budapest	1–1	3–3	4–1
Slovan Bratislava (Czechoslovakia)	1–6	(Socialist Federal Republic of Yugoslavia) Vojvodina	1–0	0–6	
Red Star (Socialist Federal Republic of Yugoslavia)	2–2	(Czechoslovakia) Dukla Praha	1–1	1–1	1–0

== Semi-finals ==
Matches played between 14 and 20 July 1957.

Team 1	Agg.	Team 2	1st leg	2nd leg
Vasas (Hungary)	6–3	(Socialist Federal Republic of Yugoslavia) Red Star	3–1	3–2
Rapid Wien (Austria)	4–4^{1}	(Socialist Federal Republic of Yugoslavia) Vojvodina	3–0	1–4

^{1} Rapid Wien withdrew from play-off and Vojvodina advanced to Final.

== Final ==
Team 1	Agg.	Team 2	1st leg	2nd leg
Vasas (Hungary)	5–2	(Socialist Federal Republic of Yugoslavia) Vojvodina	4–0	1–2

== See also ==
- 1957–58 European Cup
