= Goran Šaula =

Serbian footballer

Personal information
- Full name: Goran Šaula
- Date of birth: 1 September 1970 (age 56)
- Place of birth: Novi Sad, SR Serbia, SFR Yugoslavia
- Height: 1.84 m (6 ft 0 in)
- Position: Defender

Youth career
- Vojvodina

Senior career*
Years	Team	Apps	(Gls)
1990–1996	Vojvodina	162	(14)
1996–2000	Compostela	63	(2)
Total		225	(16)

International career
1994–1996	FR Yugoslavia	9	(0)
- * Club domestic league appearances and goals

Goran Šaula (Serbian Cyrillic: Горан Шаула; born 1 September 1970) is a Serbian former professional footballer who played as a defender.

== Club career ==
During his 10-year-long career, Šaula played for Vojvodina (1990–1996) and Compostela (1996–2000).

== International career ==
At international level, Šaula was capped nine times for FR Yugoslavia from 1994 to 1996.
