= 2026–27 FK Vojvodina season =

FK Vojvodina
2026–27 season
- Chairman: Dragoljub Zbiljić
- Manager: Miroslav Tanjga
- Stadium: Karađorđe Stadium
- Serbian SuperLiga: TBA
- UEFA Europa League: First qualifying round
colours	colours
- All statistics correct as of July 12, 2026.

The 2026–27 season is the 113th season in the history of FK Vojvodina, and the club's 23rd consecutive season in Serbian SuperLiga. In addition to the domestic league, the team is also scheduled to participate in the Serbian Cup and the UEFA Europa League.

== Transfers ==
=== In ===
Pos.	Player	Transferred from	Fee	Date	Source
FW	(Bosnia and Herzegovina) Nardin Mulahusejnović	(Armenia) Noah	€700,000	2 June 2026	
DF	(Bosnia and Herzegovina) Hamza Redžić	(Bosnia and Herzegovina) Sarajevo U19	€300,000	2 June 2026	
MF	(Serbia) Stefan Mitrović	(Italy) Hellas Verona	Loan	10 June 2026	
MF	(Bosnia and Herzegovina) Ifet Đakovac	(Russia) Akron Tolyatti	€800,000	12 June 2026	
MF	(Serbia) Dejan Zukić	(Austria) Wolfsberger	€2,500,000	20 June 2026	
FW	(Serbia) Stefan Stanisavljević	(Serbia) Novi Pazar	End of Loan	1 July 2026	
MF	(Serbia) Andrej Pivaš	(Serbia) Kabel	End of Loan	1 July 2026	
▼ Spending: €4,300,000

=== Out ===
Pos.	Player	Transferred to	Fee	Date	Source
MF	(Serbia) Uroš Nikolić	Free Agent		1 June 2025	
FW	(Guinea-Bissau) Vando Félix	(Portugal) Vitória S.C.	End of Loan	1 June 2025	
FW	(Cameroon) John Mary	(Serbia) Mladost Lučani	Undisclosed	16 June 2026	
MF	(Montenegro) Vukan Savićević	(Thailand) Buriram United	Free Transfer	21 June 2025	
▲ Income: €0

== Friendlies ==
=== Pre-season ===
24 June 2026 Friendly	Vojvodina	1–2	(Hungary) Győri	Söchau, Austria
18:30	Tanjga 14'	Report	Gavrić 5', 54'	Stadium: Kräuterdorfstadion; Attendance: 40; Referee: Mario Vonić (Austria)

27 June 2026 Friendly	Vojvodina	1–1	(Armenia) Ararat	Oberwart, Austria
11:00	Mladenović 90+3'	Report	Serobyan 48'	Stadium: Oberwart City Stadium; Attendance: 20

2 July 2025 Friendly	Vojvodina	3–0	(Romania) Universitatea Cluj	Söchau, Austria
11:00	Zukić 10' (pen.); Ranđelović 15'; Petrović 28'	Report		Stadium: Kräuterdorfstadion; Attendance: 10

== Competitions ==
=== Overall record ===
Competition	First match	Last match	Starting round	Record							
Competition	First match	Last match	Starting round	Pld	W	D	L	GF	GA	GD	Win %
Serbian SuperLiga	N/A		Matchday 1	0	0	0	0	0	0	+0	—
Serbian Cup	TBA		Round of 32	0	0	0	0	0	0	+0	—
UEFA Europa League	9 July 2026		First qualifying round	1	0	0	1	1	2	−1	0.00
Total				1	0	0	1	1	2	−1	0.00

Last updated: 12 July 2026
Source: Soccerway

=== Serbian SuperLiga ===
==== Results by matchday ====
Round	1	2	3	4	5	6	7	8	9	10	11	12	13	14	15	16	17	18	19	20	21	22	23	24	25	26
Ground	H	A	H	H	A	H	A	H	A	H	A	H	A	A	H	A	A	H	A	H	A	H	A	H	A	H
Result																										
Position																										

Updated to match(es) played on 12 July 2026. Source: https://www.superliga.rs/sezona/raspored-i-rezultati/
A = Away; H = Home; W = Win; D = Draw; L = Loss

=== UEFA Europa League ===
9 July 2026 First leg	Vojvodina (Serbia)	1–2	(Hungary) Ferencvárosi	Novi Sad, Serbia
20:00	Raemaekers 45' (o.g.)	Report	Zachariassen 8'; Dele 86'	Stadium: Karađorđe Stadium; Attendance: 7,623; Referee: Mathieu Vernice (France)

16 July 2026 Second leg	Ferencvárosi (Hungary)	v	(Serbia) Vojvodina	Budapest, Hungary
20:15				Stadium: Ferencváros Stadion

== Statistics ==
=== Squad statistics ===
No.	Pos	Nat	Player	Total		SuperLiga		Cup		Europe	
No.	Pos	Nat	Player	Apps	Goals	Apps	Goals	Apps	Goals	Apps	Goals
Goalkeepers
1	GK	(Serbia) SRB	Matija Gočmanac	0	0	0	0	0	0	0	0
12	GK	(Serbia) SRB	Dragan Rosić	1	0	0	0	0	0	1	0
71	GK	(Serbia) SRB	Bogdan Bogdanović	0	0	0	0	0	0	0	0
Defenders
2	DF	(Cameroon) CMR	Kufre Eta	0	0	0	0	0	0	0	0
5	DF	(Serbia) SRB	Đorđe Crnomarković	1	0	0	0	0	0	1	0
6	DF	(Serbia) SRB	Siniša Tanjga	0	0	0	0	0	0	0	0
16	DF	(Romania) ROU	Mihai Butean	0	0	0	0	0	0	0	0
22	DF	(Serbia) SRB	Lazar Nikolić	1	0	0	0	0	0	1	0
23	DF	(Brazil) BRA	Lucas Barros	1	0	0	0	0	0	1	0
26	DF	(Hungary) HUN	Kornél Szűcs	1	0	0	0	0	0	1	0
44	DF	(Bosnia and Herzegovina) BIH	Hamza Redžić	0	0	0	0	0	0	0	0
Midfielders
4	MF	(Serbia) SRB	Marko Poletanović	0	0	0	0	0	0	0	0
7	MF	(Serbia) SRB	Stefan Mitrović	1	0	0	0	0	0	1	0
8	MF	(Serbia) SRB	Marko Veličković	0	0	0	0	0	0	0	0
10	MF	(Serbia) SRB	Dejan Zukić	1	0	0	0	0	0	1	0
11	MF	(Serbia) SRB	Marko Mladenović	0	0	0	0	0	0	0	0
13	MF	(Serbia) SRB	Vladan Novevski	0	0	0	0	0	0	0	0
18	MF	(Serbia) SRB	Njegoš Petrović	1	0	0	0	0	0	1	0
20	MF	(Serbia) SRB	Dragan Kokanović	1	0	0	0	0	0	1	0
27	MF	(Serbia) SRB	Petar Sukačev	0	0	0	0	0	0	0	0
30	MF	(Serbia) SRB	Jovan Ostojić	0	0	0	0	0	0	0	0
35	MF	(Bosnia and Herzegovina) BIH	Ifet Đakovac	1	0	0	0	0	0	1	0
70	MF	(Serbia) SRB	Andrej Pivaš	0	0	0	0	0	0	0	0
77	MF	(Serbia) SRB	Lazar Ranđelović	1	0	0	0	0	0	1	0
Forwards
9	FW	(Serbia) SRB	Aleksa Vukanović	1	0	0	0	0	0	1	0
17	FW	(Serbia) SRB	Damjan Đokanović	0	0	0	0	0	0	0	0
21	FW	(Serbia) SRB	Milan Kolarević	1	0	0	0	0	0	1	0
25	FW	(Serbia) SRB	Lazar Peranović	0	0	0	0	0	0	0	0
33	FW	(Serbia) SRB	Vuk Boškan	0	0	0	0	0	0	0	0
55	FW	(Serbia) SRB	Milutin Vidosavljević	1	0	0	0	0	0	1	0
99	FW	(Bosnia and Herzegovina) BIH	Nardin Mulahusejnović	1	0	0	0	0	0	1	0

Last updated: 12 July 2026
Source: Competitions

=== Goal scorers ===
Rank	No.	Pos	Nat	Name	SuperLiga	Serbian Cup	Europe	Total
1				Own goal	0	0	1	1
Totals					0	0	1	1

Last updated: 12 July 2026

=== Clean sheets ===
Rank	No.	Pos	Nat	Name	SuperLiga	Serbian Cup	Europe	Total
Totals					0	0	0	0

Last updated: 12 July 2026

=== Disciplinary record ===
Number	Nation	Position	Name	SuperLiga		Serbian Cup		Europe		Total	
Number	Nation	Position	Name	Yellow card	Red card	Yellow card	Red card	Yellow card	Red card	Yellow card	Red card
18	(Serbia)	MF	Njegoš Petrović	0	0	0	0	1	0	1	0
Totals				0	0	0	0	1	0	1	0

Last updated: 12 July 2026

=== Game as captain ===
Rank	No.	Pos	Nat	Name	SuperLiga	Serbian Cup	Europe	Total
1	1	MF	(Serbia)	Dejan Zukić	0	0	1	1
Totals					0	0	1	1

Last updated: 12 July 2026

=== Attendances ===
Competition	Matches	Attendances	Average	High	Low
SuperLiga	0	0	0	0	0
Serbian Cup	0	0	0	0	0
Europe	1	7,623	7,623	7,623	7,623
Total	1	7,623	7,623	7,623	7,623

Last updated: 12 July 2026
