= 2025–26 FK Vojvodina season =

FK Vojvodina
2025–26 season
- Chairman: Dragoljub Zbiljić
- Manager: Miroslav Tanjga
- Stadium: Karađorđe Stadium
- Serbian SuperLiga: 2nd
- Serbian Cup: Runners-up
- Top goalscorer: League: Vidosavljević (8); All: Vidosavljević (10)
- Highest home attendance: 7,100 vs Partizan (8 March 2026)
- Lowest home attendance: 2,000 vs Železničar (27 September 2025)
- Average home league attendance: 3,493
colours	colours
- All statistics correct as of May 24, 2026.

The 2025–26 season is the 112th season in the history of FK Vojvodina, and the club's 22nd consecutive season in Serbian SuperLiga. In addition to the domestic league, the team is also scheduled to participate in the Serbian Cup.

== Transfers ==
=== In ===
Pos.	Player	Transferred from	Fee	Date	Source
MF	(Montenegro) Andrija Radulović	(Austria) Rapid Wien	End of Loan	1 June 2025	
FW	(Montenegro) Ivan Vukčević	(Montenegro) Sutjeska Nikšić	End of Loan	1 June 2025	
FW	(Ghana) Ibrahim Mustapha	(Austria) LASK	Undisclosed	16 June 2025	
FW	(Cameroon) John Mary	(Serbia) Novi Pazar	Free Transfer	16 June 2025	
MF	(Serbia) Vladan Novevski	(Serbia) Kabel	Free Transfer	17 June 2025	
MF	(Serbia) Marko Poletanović	(Poland) Wisła Kraków	Undisclosed	20 June 2025	
FW	(Serbia) Stefan Stanisavljević	(Serbia) Javor Ivanjica	€100,000	17 July 2025	
MF	(Serbia) Milan Kolarević	(Serbia) Voždovac	€250,000	28 July 2025	
DF	(Cameroon) Kufre Eta	(Bulgaria) CSKA 1948 Sofia	€1,000,000	29 July 2025	
GK	(Serbia) Branko Nikolić	(Serbia) Mačva	Free Transfer	30 July 2025	
MF	(Serbia) Milutin Vidosavljević	(Serbia) Radnički 1923	€600,000	13 August 2025	
Winter transfers
MF	(Serbia) Vladan Novevski	(Serbia) Kabel	End of Loan	1 January 2026	
FW	(Guinea-Bissau) Vando Félix	(Portugal) Vitória S.C.	Loan	27 January 2026	
DF	(Hungary) Kornél Szűcs	(England) Plymouth	€500,000	13 February 2026	
▼ Spending: €2,450,000

=== Out ===
Pos.	Player	Transferred to	Fee	Date	Source
FW	(Democratic Republic of the Congo) Jonathan Bolingi	Free Agent		1 June 2025	
FW	(Angola) Depú	(Portugal) Gil Vicente	End of Loan	1 June 2025	
DF	(Serbia) Stefan Đorđević	Free Agent		1 June 2025	
MF	(Montenegro) Andrija Radulović	(Austria) Rapid Wien	€1,100,000	22 June 2025	
FW	(Montenegro) Ivan Vukčević	(Montenegro) Sutjeska Nikšić	Free Transfer	23 June 2025	
DF	(Serbia) Luka Drobnjak	(Serbia) Napredak	Free Transfer	28 June 2025	
DF	(Luxembourg) Seid Korać	(Italy) Venezia	€1,400,000	10 July 2025	
FW	(Serbia) Lazar Romanić	(Japan) Kawasaki Frontale	€1,500,000	2 August 2025	
MF	(Serbia) Vladan Novevski	(Serbia) Kabel	Loan	26 August 2025	
FW	(Nigeria) Bamidele Yusuf	(Hungary) Ferencváros	€2,500,000	31 August 2025	
GK	(Serbia) Ranko Puškić	(Serbia) Grafičar Belgrade	Free Transfer	12 September 2025	
FW	(Serbia) Stefan Stanisavljević	(Serbia) Novi Pazar	Loan	18 September 2025	
Winter transfers
FW	(Ghana) Ibrahim Mustapha	(Serbia) Radnički Niš	Loan	9 January 2026	
DF	(Serbia) Stefan Bukinac	(Switzerland) Young Boys	€2,500,000	1 February 2026	
DF	(Kenya) Collins Sichenje	(England) Charlton Athletic	€2,200,000	2 February 2026	
▲ Income: €11,200,000

== Friendlies ==
=== Pre-season ===
22 June 2025 Friendly	Vojvodina	0–0	(Serbia) Mladost Lučani	Užice, Serbia
18:00		Report		Stadium: Radomir Antić Stadium; Attendance: 40

1 July 2025 Friendly	Grazer AK (Austria)	1–2	Vojvodina	Graz, Austria
18:00	Harakaté 90'	Report	Mustapha 14'; U. Nikolić 69'	Stadium: Merkur-Arena; Attendance: 720

5 July 2025 Friendly	Vojvodina	2–2	(Bulgaria) CSKA 1948 Sofia	Ilz, Austria
17:00	Vukanović 43'; Mary 84'	Report	Franco 74'; Diallo 90'	Stadium: Pfeifer Real Arena; Attendance: 80

8 July 2025 Friendly	Vojvodina	0–0	(Hungary) Fehérvár	Szombathely, Hungary
17:30		Report		Stadium: Haladás Stadium; Attendance: 80

13 July 2025 Friendly	Zenit St. Petersburg (Russia)	7–1	Vojvodina	Saint Petersburg, Russia
18:30	Glushenkov 5', 79'; Henrique 7', 87'; Santos 20', 52'; Cassierra 36'	Report	Petrović 30'	Stadium: Gazprom Arena; Attendance: 20,318; Referee: Alexander Mashlyakevich

14 July 2025 Friendly	Zenit St. Petersburg (Russia)	2–0	Vojvodina	Saint Petersburg, Russia
	Sobolev 52'; Mostovoy 64' (pen.)	Report		Stadium: SDYuShOR Smena Stadium
Note: Mostly players that haven't played in the previous game

=== Winter training camp ===
14 January 2026 Friendly	Vojvodina	2–1	(Slovenia) Maribor	Antalya, Turkey
15:00	Mladenović 53'; Boškan 87'	Report	Repas 34' (pen.)	Stadium: Mardan Sports Complex; Attendance: 100

17 January 2026 Friendly	Vojvodina	2–1	(Bulgaria) Levski Sofia	Belek, Turkey
14:00	Vidosavljević 50'; Mladenović 74'	Report	Kostadinov 29'	Stadium: Football Training Camp of Kaya Belek Hotel; Attendance: 80

20 January 2026 Friendly	Vojvodina	0–1	(Czech Republic) Zlín	Antalya, Turkey
15:00		Report	Kanu 89'	Stadium: Mardan Sports Complex; Attendance: 75

23 January 2026 Friendly	Vojvodina	1–3	(Poland) Raków	Antalya, Turkey
9:00	Ranđelović 9'	Report	Bulat 6', 32'; 41' (o.g.)	Stadium: Mardan Sports Complex; Attendance: 0
Note: Completed after 45 min due to heavy rain.

23 January 2026 Friendly	Vojvodina	v	(Poland) Korona Kielce	Antalya, Turkey
15:00		Report		Stadium: Mardan Sports Complex
Note: Cancelled due to heavy rain storm

29 January 2026 Friendly	Vojvodina	7–2	(Serbia) OFK Vrbas	Novi Sad, Serbia
13:00	Mary; Poletanović; Peranović; Pivaš; Đokanović,,	Report	Marković,	Stadium: FC Vujadin Boškov; Attendance: 100; Referee: Nikola Radaković

=== Mid-season friendlies ===
1 August 2025 Friendly	Vojvodina	3–2	(Serbia) Hajduk Divoš	Novi Sad, Serbia
18:00	Vukanović 5'; Butean 87'; Stanisavljević 90+1'	Report	Ignjić 62' (pen.); Nikolašević 71'	Stadium: FC Vujadin Boškov; Attendance: 30

20 August 2025 Friendly	Obilić Zmajevo (Serbia)	0–8	Vojvodina	Zmajevo, Serbia
17:30		Report	Mustapha; Novevski; Vidosavljević; Đokanović; Kolarević,, Borovina	Stadium: Zmajevo Stadium; Attendance: 350

6 September 2025 Friendly	Vojvodina	3–3	(Bosnia and Herzegovina) Radnik Bijeljina	Novi Sad, Serbia
17:30	Đokanović 6'; Mary 60' (pen.); Petrović 90+1'	Report	Krajišnik 49'; Pantelić 53'; Vasić 89'	Stadium: Karađorđe Stadium; Attendance: 260

26 February 2026 Friendly	Vojvodina	0–0	(Serbia) Mladost Bački Jarak	Novi Sad, Serbia
12:00		Report		Stadium: Karađorđe Stadium; Attendance: 0 Referee: Nikola Radaković

28 March 2026 Friendly	Spartak (Serbia)	1–3	Vojvodina	Subotica, Serbia
13:00	Tomović	Report	Félix 13'; Vidosavljević 38'; Mary 56'	Stadium: Subotica City Stadium; Attendance: 0

== Competitions ==
=== Overall record ===
Competition	First match	Last match	Starting round	Final position	Record							
Competition	First match	Last match	Starting round	Final position	Pld	W	D	L	GF	GA	GD	Win %
Serbian SuperLiga	27 July 2025	23 May 2026	Matchday 1	2nd	37	23	7	7	66	35	+31	62.16
Serbian Cup	3 December 2025	13 May 2026	Round of 16	Runners-up	4	2	2	0	7	5	+2	50.00
Total					41	25	9	7	73	40	+33	60.98

Last updated: 25 May 2026
Source: Soccerway

=== Serbian SuperLiga ===
==== League table ====
Pos	Team	Pld	W	D	L	GF	GA	GD	Pts	Qualification
1	Red Star Belgrade	30	24	3	3	87	23	+64	75	Qualification for the Championship round
2	Vojvodina	30	19	5	6	55	29	+26	62	Qualification for the Championship round
3	Partizan	30	19	4	7	62	39	+23	61	Qualification for the Championship round
4	Železničar	30	15	6	9	42	30	+12	51	Qualification for the Championship round
5	Novi Pazar	30	13	8	9	38	37	+1	47	Qualification for the Championship round

Source: Superliga
Rules for classification: 1) Points; 2) Head-to-head points; 3) Head-to-head goal difference; 4) Head-to-head goals scored; 5) Head-to-head away goals scored (if two teams tied); 6) Goal difference; 7) Goals scored; 8) Fair play ranking; 9) Draw.

==== Results by matchday ====
Round	1	2	3	4	5	6	7	8	9	10	11	12	13	14	15	16	17	18	19	20	21	22	23	24	25	26	27	28	29	30
Ground	H	A	H	A	H	H	A	H	A	H	A	H	A	H	A	A	H	A	H	A	A	H	A	H	A	H	A	H	A	H
Result	W	W	W	W	D	W	D	W	L	D	L	W	W	L	W	L	W	W	D	W	W	W	W	L	L	W	W	W	D	W
Position	3	2	2	2	3	2	3	3	3	3	3	3	3	3	3	3	3	3	3	3	3	3	3	3	3	3	3	2	2	2

Updated to match(es) played on 8 April 2026. Source: https://www.superliga.rs/sezona/raspored-i-rezultati/
A = Away; H = Home; W = Win; D = Draw; L = Loss

=== Results ===
20 July 2025 1	Vojvodina	2–0	Radnik Surdulica	Novi Sad
20:00	Dele 5'; Vukanović 57'; Vukanović (red card) 69'	Report		Stadium: Karađorđe Stadium; Attendance: 3,000; Referee: (Serbia) Pavle Ilić

27 July 2025 2	Spartak	1–3	Vojvodina	Subotica
21:00	Jocić 59'	Report	Petrović 45' (pen.); Mary 89'; U. Nikolić 90+3'	Stadium: Subotica City Stadium; Attendance: 1,500; Referee: (Serbia) Lazar Lukić

30 October 2025 3	Vojvodina	3–2	Red Star Belgrade	Novi Sad
18:00	Mustapha 52'; Ranđelović 77'; Kolarević 90+2'	Report	Katai 42'; Ivanić 45+3'	Stadium: Karađorđe Stadium; Attendance: 5,500; Referee: (Serbia) Pavle Ilić
Note: Game was originally scheduled on 2 August 2025, but was postponed to 30 October due to Red Star match in the UEFA Champions League

9 August 2025 4	OFK Beograd	1–2	Vojvodina	Stara Pazova
21:00	H. Addo 37', (red card) 72'	Report	Dele 28' (pen.); Vukanović 53'	Stadium: SC FSS; Attendance: 700; Referee: (Serbia) Dejan Trifković
Note: OFK Beograd plays home matches at Serbian FA Sports Center in Stara Pazova due to reconstruction on Omladinski Stadium in Belgrade

16 August 2025 5	Vojvodina	2–2	Javor	Novi Sad
20:00	L. Nikolić 72'; Ranđelović 84'	Report	Saliman 78'; Eta 89' (o.g.)	Stadium: Karađorđe Stadium; Attendance: 3,000; Referee: (Serbia) Milan Stefanović

23 August 2025 6	Vojvodina	2–0	TSC	Novi Sad
21:00	Vidosavljević 1'; Dele 21'	Report		Stadium: Karađorđe Stadium; Attendance: 3,500; Referee: (Serbia) Miloš Milanović

30 August 2025 7	Mladost Lučani	0–0	Vojvodina	Lučani
21:00		Report		Stadium: SRC MR Radoš Milovanović; Attendance: 500; Referee: (Serbia) Aleksandar Živković

13 September 2025 8	Vojvodina	3–1	Čukarički	Novi Sad
20:00	Tomović 70' (o.g.); Ranđelović 71'; Mary 86'	Report	Docić 54' (pen.)	Stadium: Karađorđe Stadium; Attendance: 3,250; Referee: (Serbia) Milan Mitić

20 September 2025 9	Novi Pazar	1–0	Vojvodina	Novi Pazar
17:30	Stanisavljević 3'	Report	Sichenje (red card) 43'	Stadium: Novi Pazar City Stadium; Attendance: 500; Referee: (Serbia) Stanko Ostraćanin

27 September 2025 10	Vojvodina	1–1	Železničar	Novi Sad
19:30	Ranđelović 63'	Report	Karikari 28'	Stadium: Karađorđe Stadium; Attendance: 2,000; Referee: (Serbia) Milan Ilić

4 October 2025 11	Partizan	1–0	Vojvodina	Belgrade
20:30	Milošević 18' (pen.)	Report	Tanjga (red card) 30'	Stadium: Partizan Stadium; Attendance: 12,000; Referee: (Serbia) Aleksandar Živković

18 October 2025 12	Vojvodina	4–1	Radnički 1923	Novi Sad
18:00	Kokanović 37'; Vidosavljević 64', 76'; Sichenje (red card) 84'; Mary 90+3'	Report	Hassine 43'	Stadium: Karađorđe Stadium; Attendance: 3,200; Referee: (Serbia) Ivan Stamenković

24 October 2025 13	Napredak	1–4	Vojvodina	Kruševac
16:00	Bubanj 53'	Report	Kokanović 10'; Vidosavljević 14'; Kolarević 19'; Ranđelović 42'	Stadium: Mladost Stadium (Kruševac); Attendance: 300; Referee: (Serbia) Momčilo Marković

2 November 2025 14	Vojvodina	1–3	IMT	Novi Sad
17:00	Sichenje 80'	Report	Thill 18'; Jevtić 78'; Karamoko 86'	Stadium: Karađorđe Stadium; Attendance: 4,300; Referee: (Serbia) Andrija Stojanović

8 November 2025 15	Radnički Niš	0–1	Vojvodina	Niš
19:00		Report	Mary 76'	Stadium: Čair Stadium; Attendance: 1,000; Referee: (Serbia) Milan Stefanović

21 November 2025 16	Radnik Surdulica	3–1	Vojvodina	Surdulica
15:00	Popović 5'; Rosić 20' (o.g.); Hajdarević 35'	Report	Trémoulet 51' (o.g.)	Stadium: Surdulica City Stadium; Attendance: 300; Referee: (Serbia) Milan Ilić

29 November 2025 17	Vojvodina	2–0	Spartak	Novi Sad
16:30	Kokanović 54'; Vidosavljević 90+4'	Report		Stadium: Karađorđe Stadium; Attendance: 2,127; Referee: (Serbia) Marko Ivković

7 December 2025 18	Red Star Belgrade	0–1	Vojvodina	Belgrade
17:00		Report	Petrović 54'	Stadium: Rajko Mitić Stadium; Attendance: 8,126; Referee: (Serbia) Novak Simović

13 December 2025 19	Vojvodina	0–0	OFK Beograd	Novi Sad
16:30		Report		Stadium: Karađorđe Stadium; Attendance: 3,890; Referee: (Serbia) Danilo Nikolić

20 December 2025 20	Javor	1–2	Vojvodina	Ivanjica
14:00	Loué 37'	Report	Vukanović 47'; Mladenović 67'	Stadium: Stadion kraj Moravice; Attendance: 350; Referee: (Serbia) Milan Mitić

1 February 2026 21	TSC	0–2	Vojvodina	Bačka Topola
15:00		Report	Vukanović 41'; Kolarević 67'	Stadium: TSC Arena; Attendance: 2,000; Referee: (Serbia) Dejan Trifković

8 February 2026 22	Vojvodina	5–0	Mladost Lučani	Novi Sad
15:30	Savićević 31' (pen.); Vidosavljević 41' (pen.); Kolarević 44'; Vukanović 51'; Veličković 77'	Report		Stadium: Karađorđe Stadium; Attendance: 2,500; Referee: (Serbia) Predrag Janjuš

14 February 2026 23	Čukarički	2–3	Vojvodina	Belgrade
17:00	Miladinović 47'; Tanjga 52' (o.g.)	Report	Petrović 56'; Vidosavljević 71'; Kokanović 82'	Stadium: Čukarički Stadium; Attendance: 450; Referee: (Serbia) Miloš Milanović

21 February 2026 24	Vojvodina	0–3	Novi Pazar	Novi Sad
16:00		Report	Camaj 10', 78'; Stanisavljević 45+3'	Stadium: Karađorđe Stadium; Attendance: 2,200; Referee: (Serbia) Stefan Jeknić

28 February 2026 25	Železničar	2–0	Vojvodina	Pančevo
16:00	Pirgić 26' (pen.); Karikari 28'	Report		Stadium: SRC Mladost Pančevo; Attendance: 1,200; Referee: (Serbia) Novak Simović

8 March 2026 26	Vojvodina	3–0	Partizan	Novi Sad
18:00	Savićević 43'; Veličković 90+5' (pen.); Mary 90+8' (pen.)	Report		Stadium: Karađorđe Stadium; Attendance: 7,100; Referee: (Serbia) Srđan Jovanović

15 March 2026 27	Radnički 1923	0–1	Vojvodina	Kragujevac
19:30		Report	Mary 88'	Stadium: Čika Dača Stadium; Attendance: 2,200; Referee: (Serbia) Milan Mitić

21 March 2026 28	Vojvodina	4–1	Napredak	Novi Sad
17:00	Vukanović 28'; Veličković 30'; Ranđelović 63'; Kokanović 84'	Report	Bogdanovski 80'	Stadium: Karađorđe Stadium; Attendance: 2,500; Referee: (Serbia) Momčilo Marković

4 April 2026 29	IMT	0–0	Vojvodina	Loznica
20:00		Report		Stadium: Lagator Stadium; Attendance: 250; Referee: (Serbia) Milan Ilić

8 April 2026 30	Vojvodina	3–2	Radnički Niš	Novi Sad
18:00	Veličković 22'; Vukanović 58'; Savićević 64'	Report	Abass 56'; M. Radonjić 82'	Stadium: Karađorđe Stadium; Attendance: 3,500; Referee: (Serbia) Predrag Janjuš

==== Championship round league table ====
Pos	Team	Pld	W	D	L	GF	GA	GD	Pts	Qualification	RSB	VOJ	PAR	ZEL	NPZ	OFK	RAD	CUK
1	Red Star Belgrade (C)	37	27	5	5	100	31	+69	86	Qualification for the Champions League second qualifying round		4–1	3–0		1–2	1–2		
2	Vojvodina	37	23	7	7	66	35	+31	76	Qualification for the Europa League first qualifying round (Note: The winner of the 2025–26 Serbian Cup (Red Star Belgrade) qualifies for the Europa League first qualifying round. Since the champions won the cup, the second place team takes the Europa League berth and the fourth place team gets a Conference League berth.)			0–0	0–0	3–0			1–0
3	Partizan	37	22	7	8	72	45	+27	73	Qualification for the Conference League second qualifying round				2–1	2–1	1–1	5–0	
4	Železničar	37	16	11	10	50	37	+13	59	Qualification for the Conference League second qualifying round	2–2					2–0	1–1	0–0
5	Novi Pazar	37	14	10	13	46	54	−8	52					2–2		1–5		2–2

Updated to match(es) played on 23 May 2026. Source: (in Serbian)
Legend: Blue = home team win; Yellow = draw; Red = away team win.
Rules for classification: 1) Points; 2) Points in regular season; 3) Head-to-head points in regular season; 4) Head-to-head goal difference in regular season; 5) Head-to-head goals scored in regular season; 6) Head-to-head away goals scored in regular season (if two teams tied); 7) Goal difference; 8) Goals scored; 9) Fair play ranking; 10) Drawing of lots.
(C) Champions

==== Championship round result round by round ====
Round	1	2	3	4	5	6	7
Ground	A	H	H	A	H	A	H
Result	L	D	D	W	W	W	W
Position	3	3	3	3	2	2	2

Updated to match(es) played on 24 May 2026. Source: https://www.superliga.rs/sezona/tabela-takmicenja/
A = Away; H = Home; W = Win; D = Draw; L = Loss

==== Championship round matches ====
18 April 2026 31	Red Star Belgrade	4–1	Vojvodina	Belgrade
17:00	Katai 42'; Kostov 45+2'; Arnautović 69'; Enem 79'	Report	Tanjga (red card) 21'; Sukačev 66'	Stadium: Rajko Mitić Stadium; Attendance: 7,000; Referee: (Serbia) Dejan Trifković

22 April 2026 32	Vojvodina	0–0	Partizan	Novi Sad
17:00		Report		Stadium: Karađorđe Stadium; Attendance: 5,500; Referee: (Serbia) Nenad Minaković

26 April 2026 33	Vojvodina	0–0	Železničar	Novi Sad
20:00		Report		Stadium: Karađorđe Stadium; Attendance: 2,500; Referee: (Serbia) Milan Stefanović

4 May 2026 34	Radnik Surdulica	1–4	Vojvodina	Surdulica
17:00	Novaković 50'	Report	Filipović 31' (o.g.); Kolarević 61'. 90+2'; Vidosavljević 68'	Stadium: Surdulica City Stadium; Attendance: 400; Referee: (Serbia) Novak Simović

8 May 2026 35	Vojvodina	1–0	Čukarički	Novi Sad
18:00	Butean 27'	Report		Stadium: Karađorđe Stadium; Attendance: 2,500; Referee: (Serbia) Danilo Nikolić

17 May 2026 36	OFK Beograd	1–2	Vojvodina	Belgrade
20:00	Šljivić 62' (pen.)	Report	Ranđelović 16'; Petrović 72'	Stadium: Omladinski Stadium; Attendance: 520; Referee: (Serbia) Nenad Minaković

23 May 2026 37	Vojvodina	3–0	Novi Pazar	Novi Sad
18:00	Sukačev 8'; Manev 29' (o.g.); Peranović 84'	Report		Stadium: Karađorđe Stadium; Attendance: 4,200; Referee: (Serbia) Ivan Stamenković

=== Serbian Cup ===
Round of 32	Mladost GAT	0–3	Vojvodina	Novi Sad
		Report		Stadium: GAT Arena
Note: FK Mladost GAT withdrew from the competition, and Vojvodina secured a direct place in the round of 16.

3 December 2025 Round of 16	OFK Vršac	1–2	Vojvodina	Vršac
13:00	Lainović 45+1'	Report	Vidosavljević 20'; Barros (red card) 85'; Đokanović 90+10'	Stadium: Vršac City Stadium; Attendance: 520; Referee: (Serbia) Predrag Janjuš

4 March 2026 Quarter-finals	Vojvodina	1–1 (2–0 p)	Trayal Kruševac	Novi Sad
15:30	Vidosavljević 70'	Report	Nikolić 88'	Stadium: Karađorđe Stadium; Attendance: 1,000; Referee: (Serbia) Stanko Ostraćanin
	Penalties
	Veličković (penalty scored); Ranđelović (penalty missed); Vidosavljević (penalty scored); Barros (penalty missed)		(penalty missed) Nikolić; (penalty missed) Cvetojević; (penalty missed) Ivić; (penalty missed) Bogdanović

29 April 2026 Semi-finals	Grafičar	1–2	Vojvodina	Belgrade
18:30	Lazić 47'	Report	Vukanović 8'; Sukačev 64'	Stadium: Rajko Mitić Stadium; Attendance: 250; Referee: (Serbia) Milan Ilić

13 May 2026 Final	Red Star Belgrade	2–2 (5–4 p)	Vojvodina	Loznica
20:00	Arnautović 53'; Rodrigão 90+7'	Report	Szűcs 3'; Vidosavljević 35'	Stadium: Lagator Stadium; Attendance: 6,027; Referee: (Serbia) Pavle Ilić
	Penalties
	Duarte (penalty scored); Händel (penalty scored); Krunić (penalty scored); Lučić (penalty missed); Enem (penalty scored); Rodrigão (penalty scored)		(penalty scored) Medojević; (penalty scored) Szűcs; (penalty missed) Mladenović; (penalty scored) Ranđelović; (penalty scored) Kokanović; (penalty missed) Mary

== Statistics ==
=== Squad statistics ===
No.	Pos	Nat	Player	Total		SuperLiga		Cup	
No.	Pos	Nat	Player	Apps	Goals	Apps	Goals	Apps	Goals
Goalkeepers
1	GK	(Serbia) SRB	Matija Gočmanac	5	0	2	0	3	0
12	GK	(Serbia) SRB	Dragan Rosić	36	0	35	0	1	0
71	GK	(Serbia) SRB	Bogdan Bogdanović	0	0	0	0	0	0
Defenders
2	DF	(Cameroon) CMR	Kufre Eta	11	0	10	0	1	0
5	DF	(Serbia) SRB	Đorđe Crnomarković	31	0	29	0	2	0
6	DF	(Serbia) SRB	Siniša Tanjga	20	0	18	0	2	0
16	DF	(Romania) ROU	Mihai Butean	11	1	10	1	1	0
22	DF	(Serbia) SRB	Lazar Nikolić	36	1	33	1	3	0
23	DF	(Brazil) BRA	Lucas Barros	26	0	22	0	4	0
26	DF	(Hungary) HUN	Kornél Szűcs	12	1	9	0	3	1
Midfielders
4	MF	(Serbia) SRB	Marko Poletanović	21	0	19	0	2	0
8	MF	(Montenegro) MNE	Vukan Savićević	36	3	33	3	3	0
10	MF	(Serbia) SRB	Uroš Nikolić	7	1	7	1	0	0
11	MF	(Serbia) SRB	Marko Mladenović	16	1	15	1	1	0
13	MF	(Serbia) SRB	Vladan Novevski	2	0	2	0	0	0
14	MF	(Serbia) SRB	Miloš Popović	0	0	0	0	0	0
18	MF	(Serbia) SRB	Njegoš Petrović	36	4	33	4	3	0
20	MF	(Serbia) SRB	Dragan Kokanović	34	5	30	5	4	0
24	MF	(Serbia) SRB	Marko Veličković	23	4	21	4	2	0
27	MF	(Serbia) SRB	Petar Sukačev	20	2	17	1	3	1
30	MF	(Serbia) SRB	Jovan Ostojić	1	0	1	0	0	0
34	MF	(Serbia) SRB	Slobodan Medojević	16	0	14	0	2	0
77	MF	(Serbia) SRB	Lazar Ranđelović	37	7	33	7	4	0
Forwards
7	FW	(Guinea-Bissau) GBS	Vando Félix	11	0	8	0	3	0
9	FW	(Serbia) SRB	Aleksa Vukanović	37	8	34	7	3	1
21	FW	(Serbia) SRB	Milan Kolarević	28	6	27	6	1	0
25	FW	(Serbia) SRB	Lazar Peranović	1	1	1	1	0	0
28	FW	(Cameroon) CMR	John Mary	28	6	24	6	4	0
33	FW	(Serbia) SRB	Vuk Boškan	1	0	1	0	0	0
36	FW	(Serbia) SRB	Damjan Đokanović	13	1	12	0	1	1
55	FW	(Serbia) SRB	Milutin Vidosavljević	33	11	29	8	4	3
Players transferred out during the season
7	FW	(Nigeria) NGR	Dele	5	3	5	3	0	0
19	FW	(Serbia) SRB	Stefan Stanisavljević	1	0	1	0	0	0
17	FW	(Ghana) GHA	Ibrahim Mustapha	11	1	10	1	1	0
30	DF	(Serbia) SRB	Stefan Bukinac	21	0	20	0	1	0
29	DF	(Kenya) KEN	Collins Sichenje	18	1	17	1	1	0

Last updated: 24 May 2026
Source: Competitions

=== Goal scorers ===
Rank	No.	Pos	Nat	Name	SuperLiga	Serbian Cup	Total
1	55	MF	(Serbia)	Milutin Vidosavljević	8	3	10
2	9	FW	(Serbia)	Aleksa Vukanović	7	1	8
3	77	MF	(Serbia)	Lazar Ranđelović	7	0	7
4	28	FW	(Cameroon)	John Mary	6	0	6
4	21	FW	(Serbia)	Milan Kolarević	6	0	6
5	20	MF	(Serbia)	Dragan Kokanović	5	0	5
6	18	MF	(Serbia)	Njegoš Petrović	4	0	4
6	24	MF	(Serbia)	Marko Veličković	4	0	4
6				Own goal	4	0	4
7	8	MF	(Montenegro)	Vukan Savićević	3	0	3
7	7	FW	(Nigeria)	Dele	3	0	3
7	27	FW	(Serbia)	Petar Sukačev	2	1	3
8	10	MF	(Serbia)	Uroš Nikolić	1	0	1
8	17	FW	(Ghana)	Ibrahim Mustapha	1	0	1
8	22	MF	(Serbia)	Lazar Nikolić	1	0	1
8	29	DF	(Kenya)	Collins Sichenje	1	0	1
8	11	MF	(Serbia)	Marko Mladenović	1	0	1
8	16	DF	(Romania)	Mihai Butean	1	0	1
8	25	FW	(Serbia)	Lazar Peranović	1	0	1
8	36	FW	(Serbia)	Damjan Đokanović	0	1	1
8	26	DF	(Hungary)	Kornél Szűcs	0	1	1
Totals					66	7	73

Last updated: 24 May 2026

=== Clean sheets ===
Rank	No.	Pos	Nat	Name	SuperLiga	Serbian Cup	Total
1	12	GK	(Serbia)	Dragan Rosić	14	0	14
2	1	GK	(Serbia)	Matija Gočmanac	2	0	2
Totals					16	0	16

Last updated: 24 May 2026

=== Disciplinary record ===
Number	Nation	Position	Name	SuperLiga		Serbian Cup		Total	
Number	Nation	Position	Name	Yellow card	Red card	Yellow card	Red card	Yellow card	Red card
2	(Cameroon)	DF	Kufre Eta	3	0	0	0	3	0
4	(Serbia)	MF	Marko Poletanović	1	0	2	0	3	0
5	(Serbia)	DF	Đorđe Crnomarković	7	0	1	0	8	0
6	(Serbia)	DF	Siniša Tanjga	5	2	0	0	5	2
7	(Guinea-Bissau)	FW	Vando Félix	1	0	0	0	1	0
7	(Nigeria)	FW	Dele	3	0	1	0	4	0
8	(Montenegro)	MF	Vukan Savićević	5	0	1	0	6	0
9	(Serbia)	FW	Aleksa Vukanović	2	1	0	0	2	1
11	(Serbia)	MF	Marko Mladenović	1	0	1	0	2	0
12	(Serbia)	GK	Dragan Rosić	2	0	0	0	2	0
13	(Serbia)	MF	Vladan Novevski	1	0	0	0	1	0
16	(Romania)	DF	Mihai Butean	1	0	0	0	1	0
17	(Ghana)	FW	Ibrahim Mustapha	1	0	0	0	1	0
18	(Serbia)	MF	Njegoš Petrović	7	0	1	0	8	0
20	(Serbia)	MF	Dragan Kokanović	8	0	1	0	9	0
21	(Serbia)	FW	Milan Kolarević	3	0	0	0	3	0
22	(Serbia)	DF	Lazar Nikolić	5	0	2	0	7	0
23	(Brazil)	DF	Lucas Barros	5	0	2	1	7	1
24	(Serbia)	MF	Marko Veličković	2	0	0	0	2	0
26	(Hungary)	DF	Kornél Szűcs	0	0	1	0	1	0
27	(Serbia)	FW	Petar Sukačev	3	0	0	0	3	0
28	(Cameroon)	FW	John Mary	1	0	0	0	1	0
29	(Kenya)	DF	Collins Sichenje	4	2	0	0	4	2
30	(Serbia)	DF	Stefan Bukinac	2	0	0	0	2	0
34	(Serbia)	MF	Slobodan Medojević	1	0	1	0	2	0
36	(Serbia)	FW	Damjan Đokanović	1	0	1	0	2	0
55	(Serbia)	MF	Milutin Vidosavljević	4	0	0	0	4	0
77	(Serbia)	MF	Lazar Ranđelović	3	0	0	0	3	0
Totals				82	5	15	1	97	6

Last updated: 24 May 2026

=== Game as captain ===
Rank	No.	Pos	Nat	Name	SuperLiga	Serbian Cup	Total
1	18	MF	(Serbia)	Njegoš Petrović	25	2	27
2	34	MF	(Serbia)	Slobodan Medojević	7	1	8
3	9	FW	(Serbia)	Aleksa Vukanović	5	1	6
Totals					37	4	41

Last updated: 24 May 2026

=== Attendances ===
Competition	Matches	Attendances	Average	High	Low
SuperLiga	19	66,367	3,493	7,100	2,000
Serbian Cup	1	1,000	1,000	1,000	1,000
Total	20	67,367	3,368	7,100	1,000

Last updated: 24 May 2026
