= Vuk Boškan =

Serbian footballer

Vuk Boškan Вук Бошкан
Personal information
- Date of birth: 8 February 2006 (age 20)
- Place of birth: Tours, France
- Height: 1.91 m (6 ft 3 in)
- Position: Centre-forward

Team information
- Current team: Vojvodina
- Number: 33

Youth career
- Meridianа Novi Sad
- Vojvodina

Senior career*
Years	Team	Apps	(Gls)
2024–	Vojvodina	6	(0)
2024–2026	→ Kabel (loan) (Note: Under the regulations of the Football Association of Serbia, young players under contract with a Serbian SuperLiga club may also appear for an affiliated lower-tier club while remaining registered only with their parent club.)	53	(26)
- * Club domestic league appearances and goals as of 1 November 2026

Vuk Boškan (Serbian Cyrillic: Вук Бошкан; born 8 February 2006) is a Serbian professional footballer who plays as a centre-forward for Vojvodina.

== Club career ==
Boškan began playing football at the Meridiana football school before joining the youth academy of Vojvodina. Initially deployed as a midfielder and defender, he later established himself as a centre-forward.

In June 2023, he signed his first professional contract with Vojvodina.

He was first included in Vojvodina's senior matchday squad in September 2024 for a Serbian SuperLiga match against Partizan. Boškan made his senior debut for Vojvodina on 30 October 2024 in a Serbian Cup match against Radnički Sremska Mitrovica, replacing Yusuf Bamidele in the 75th minute under manager Nenad Lalatović.

Boškan began the 2024–25 season with Vojvodina's youth team before joining affiliated club Kabel, helping the side win the Serbian League Vojvodina title. He finished the season with eight goals for the club. During the first half of the 2025–26 Serbian First League season, Boškan scored another eight goals for Kabel, before finishing the campaign as the league's top scorer with 18 goals.

In January 2026, Boškan extended his contract with Vojvodina and participated in the club's winter preparations under manager Miroslav Tanjga. During the preparations, he scored the winning goal in a friendly match against Maribor. Boškan made his Serbian SuperLiga debut in May 2026 in a victory over Novi Pazar, replacing Damjan Đokanović in the 71st minute.

== Personal life ==
Boškan is the son of former Serbia national volleyball team player Slobodan Boškan.

== Career statistics ==
As of 1 November 2026

Club	Season	League			Cup		Continental		Total	
Club	Season	Division	Apps	Goals	Apps	Goals	Apps	Goals	Apps	Goals
Vojvodina	2024–25	Serbian SuperLiga	0	0	1	0	0	0	1	0
Vojvodina	2025–26	Serbian SuperLiga	1	0	0	0	–		1	0
Vojvodina	2026–27	Serbian SuperLiga	5	0	1	0	–		6	0
Vojvodina	Total		6	0	2	0	0	0	8	0
Kabel (loan)	2024–25	Serbian League Vojvodina	19	8	–		–		19	8
Kabel (loan)	2025–26	Serbian First League	34	18	–		–		34	18
Kabel (loan)	Total		53	26	0	0	–		53	26
Career total			59	26	2	0	0	0	61	26

== Honours ==
=== Kabel ===
- Serbian League Vojvodina: 2024–25

=== Individual ===
- Serbian First League top scorer: 2025–26
