= Pertate =

Pertate Пертате (Serbian)
- Village
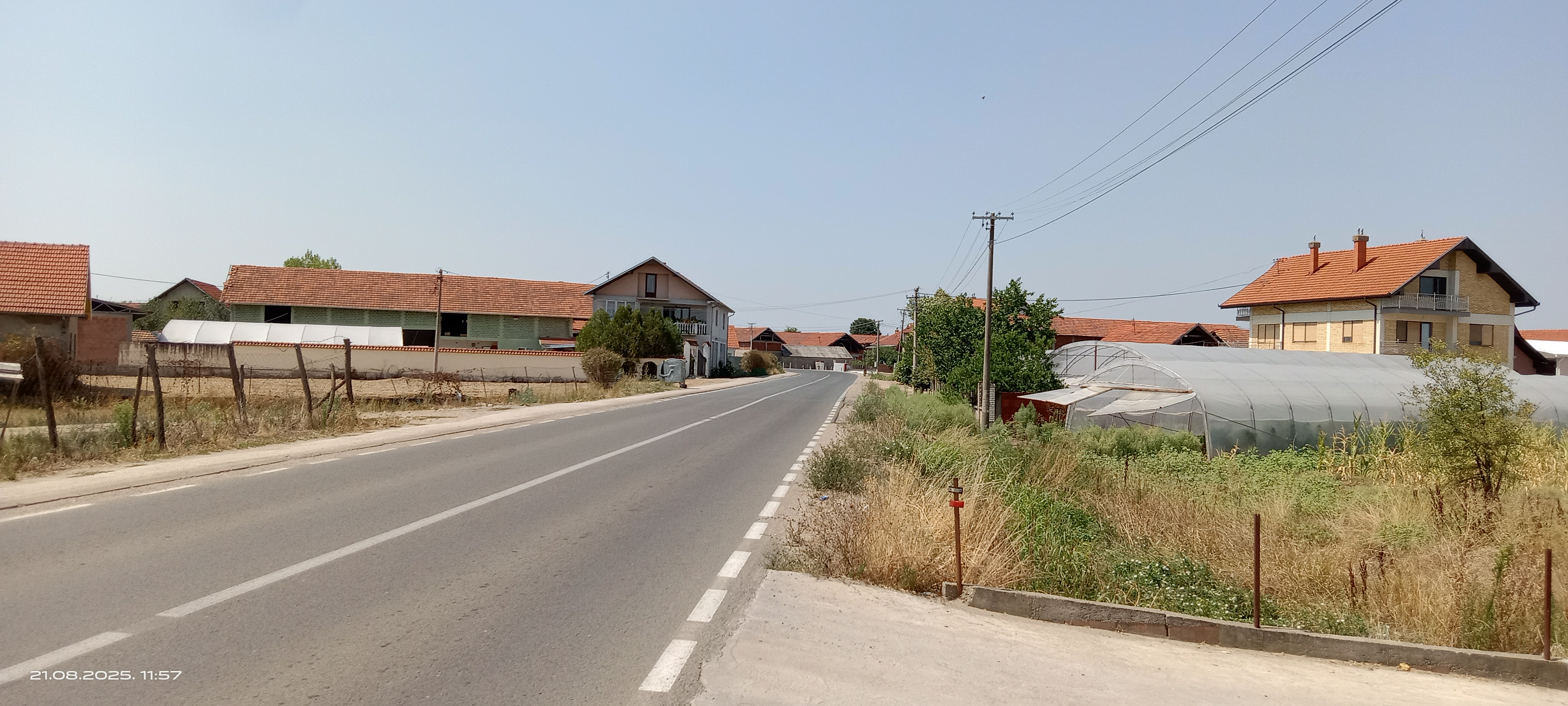

- Location within Serbia
- Coordinates: 42°57′35″N 21°50′19″E
- Country: Serbia
- District: Jablanica District
- Municipality: Lebane
- Elevation: 571 ft (174 m)

Population
  - Total: 2,210
- Time zone: UTC+1 (CET)
  - Summer (DST): UTC+2 (CEST)

Pertate is a village in the municipality of Lebane, Serbia. According to the 2020 census, the village has a population of 2210 people.

== Notable residents ==
- Lazar Ranđelović, born 1997, footballer
