= Đorđe Crnomarković =

Serbian footballer

Personal information
- Date of birth: 10 September 1993 (age 33)
- Place of birth: Belgrade, FR Yugoslavia
- Height: 1.88 m (6 ft 2 in)
- Positions: Centre-back; left-back

Team information
- Current team: Vojvodina
- Number: 5

Senior career*
Years	Team	Apps	(Gls)
2010–2012	Beograd	16	(0)
2012–2013	Šumadija Jagnjilo	30	(3)
2014–2015	Donji Srem	21	(0)
2015–2016	Javor Ivanjica	31	(0)
2016–2017	Olimpija Ljubljana	0	(0)
2017	Čukarički	4	(0)
2018	Javor Ivanjica	9	(0)
2018–2019	Radnički Niš	32	(0)
2019–2021	Lech Poznań	34	(0)
2019	Lech Poznań II	2	(0)
2021	→ Zagłębie Lubin (loan)	9	(0)
2021–2023	Olimpija Ljubljana	52	(3)
2023–	Vojvodina	98	(1)
- * Club domestic league appearances and goals as of 11 October 2026

Đorđe Crnomarković (Serbian Cyrillic: Ђорђе Црномарковић; born 10 September 1993) is a Serbian professional footballer who plays as a defender for Vojvodina.

== Club career ==
Crnomarković started career playing with Beograd, and later played for Šumadija Jagnjilo for a season and a half. In early 2014, he signed with Donji Srem. He made his Serbian SuperLiga debut for Donji Srem in an away match versus Čukarički on 17 April 2014. In summer 2015, he joined Javor Ivanjica. On 26 June 2016, he joined Slovenian champions Olimpija Ljubljana on a three-year contract. Shortly after leaving Olimpija, Crnomarković made a deal with Čukarički in May 2017. In late 2017, Crnomarković mutually terminated his contract with Čukarički, after which he returned to Javor Ivanjica in January 2018. In June 2018, Crnomarković moved to Radnički Niš.

=== Lech Poznań ===
On 25 June 2019, Crnomarković signed a three-year contract with Polish side Lech Poznań. He made his debut for Lech on 20 July 2019 in a game against defending champions Piast Gliwice.

=== Vojvodina ===
On 1 July 2023, Crnomarković signed a three-year deal with Vojvodina.

== Career statistics ==
As of 11 October 2026

Appearances and goals by club, season and competition
Club	Season	League			National cup (Note: Includes Serbian Cup, Polish Cup, Slovenian Cup)		Continental		Total	
Club	Season	Division	Apps	Goals	Apps	Goals	Apps	Goals	Apps	Goals
Beograd	2010–11	Serbian League Belgrade	3	0	—		—		3	0
Beograd	2011–12	Serbian League Belgrade	13	0	—		—		13	0
Beograd	Total		16	0	—		—		16	0
Šumadija Jagnjilo	2012–13	Serbian League Belgrade	19	2	—		—		19	2
Šumadija Jagnjilo	2013–14	Serbian League Belgrade	11	1	—		—		11	1
Šumadija Jagnjilo	Total		30	3	—		—		30	3
Donji Srem	2013–14	Serbian SuperLiga	4	0	—		—		4	0
Donji Srem	2014–15	Serbian SuperLiga	17	0	1	0	—		18	0
Donji Srem	Total		21	0	1	0	—		22	0
Javor Ivanjica	2015–16	Serbian SuperLiga	31	0	4	0	—		35	0
Olimpija Ljubljana	2016–17	Slovenian PrvaLiga	0	0	0	0	0	0	0	0
Čukarički	2017–18	Serbian SuperLiga	4	0	1	0	—		5	0
Javor Ivanjica	2017–18	Serbian SuperLiga	9	0	1	0	—		10	0
Radnički Niš	2018–19	Serbian SuperLiga	32	0	4	0	3 (Note: Appearance(s) in UEFA Europa League)	0	39	0
Lech Poznań	2019–20	Ekstraklasa	26	0	4	0	—		30	0
Lech Poznań	2020–21	Ekstraklasa	8	0	2	0	7	0	17	0
Lech Poznań	Total		34	0	6	0	7	0	47	0
Lech Poznań II	2019–20	II liga	2	0	—		—		2	0
Zagłębie Lubin (loan)	2020–21	Ekstraklasa	9	0	1	0	—		10	0
Olimpija Ljubljana	2021–22	Slovenian PrvaLiga	26	2	1	0	2 (Note: Appearance(s) in UEFA Europa Conference League)	0	29	2
Olimpija Ljubljana	2022–23	Slovenian PrvaLiga	26	1	4	0	4	0	34	1
Olimpija Ljubljana	Total		52	3	5	0	6	0	63	3
Vojvodina	2023–24	Serbian SuperLiga	34	0	4	0	2	0	40	0
Vojvodina	2024–25	Serbian SuperLiga	27	1	0	0	4 (Note: Two appearances in UEFA Europa League, two appearances and one goal in UEFA Conference League)	1	31	2
Vojvodina	2025–26	Serbian SuperLiga	29	0	2	0	—		31	0
Vojvodina	2026–27	Serbian SuperLiga	8	0	1	0	4	1	13	1
Vojvodina	Total		98	1	7	0	10	2	115	3
Career total			338	7	30	0	26	2	394	9

== Honours ==
Olimpija Ljubljana

- Slovenian PrvaLiga: 2022–23
- Slovenian Cup: 2022–23
