= Milan Kolarević =

Serbian footballer

Personal information
- Date of birth: 7 April 2004 (age 22)
- Place of birth: Smederevska Palanka, Serbia and Montenegro
- Height: 1.74 m (5 ft 9 in)
- Position: Winger

Team information
- Current team: Vojvodina
- Number: 21

Youth career
- –2019: Jasenica 2017
- 2019–2021: Sinđelić Beograd

Senior career*
Years	Team	Apps	(Gls)
2021–2024	Sinđelić Beograd	72	(18)
2024–2025	Voždovac	46	(6)
2025–	Vojvodina	43	(9)
2025	→ Kabel (loan)	2	(2)

International career^{‡}
2026–	Serbia U21	4	(0)
Medal record
Men's football
Representing
UEFA Regions' Cup
Silver medal – second place	2023 Spain	Belgrade
- * Club domestic league appearances and goals as of 22 November 2026 ‡ National team caps and goals as of 17 November 2026

Milan Kolarević (Serbian Cyrillic: Милан Коларевић; born 7 April 2004) is a professional footballer who plays as a winger for Serbian SuperLiga club Vojvodina.

== Club career ==
=== Voždovac ===
On 16 January 2024, Kolarević signed three-and-a-half year contract with Serbian SuperLiga club Voždovac.

=== Vojvodina ===
On 28 July 2025, Kolarević signed a four-year contract with Vojvodina, for an estimated transfer fee of €250,000 and 15% of the next sale.

== Career statistics ==
As of 22 November 2026

Club	Season	League			Cup		Continental		Other		Total	
Club	Season	Division	Apps	Goals	Apps	Goals	Apps	Goals	Apps	Goals	Apps	Goals
Sinđelić Beograd	2021–22	Serbian League Belgrade	30	8	–		–		1	0	31	8
Sinđelić Beograd	2022–23	Serbian League Belgrade	27	4	–		–		1	0	28	4
Sinđelić Beograd	2023–24	Serbian League Belgrade	15	6	–		–		1	0	16	6
Sinđelić Beograd	Total		72	18	–		–		3	0	75	18
Voždovac	2023–24	Serbian SuperLiga	11	1	1	0	–		–		12	1
Voždovac	2024–25	Serbian First League	35	5	1	0	–		–		36	5
Voždovac	Total		46	6	2	0	–		–		48	6
Vojvodina	2025–26	Serbian SuperLiga	27	6	1	0	–		–		28	6
Vojvodina	2026–27	Serbian SuperLiga	16	3	0	0	3	0	–		19	3
Vojvodina	Total		43	9	1	0	3	0	–		47	9
Kabel (loan)	2025–26	Serbian First League	2	2	–		–		–		2	2
Career total			163	35	3	0	3	0	3	0	172	35

== Honours ==
Individual

- Serbian SuperLiga Player of the Week: 2026–27 (Round 9)
