= Siniša Tanjga =

Serbian footballer

Personal information
- Date of birth: 11 March 2004 (age 22)
- Place of birth: Berlin, Germany
- Height: 1.89 m (6 ft 2 in)
- Positions: Centre-back; defensive midfielder

Team information
- Current team: Vojvodina
- Number: 6

Youth career
- 2019–2020: Vojvodina
- 2020–2021: Bologna
- 2021–2022: Vojvodina
- 2022–2023: Mainz 05

Senior career*
Years	Team	Apps	(Gls)
2023–	Vojvodina	23	(0)
2024	→ Mladost GAT (loan)	1	(0)
- * Club domestic league appearances and goals as of 16 July 2026

Siniša Tanjga (Serbian Cyrillic: Синиша Тањга; born 11 March 2004) is a Serbian professional footballer who plays as a Defender and Midfielder for Serbian SuperLiga club Vojvodina.

== Club career ==
=== Early career ===
Tanjga started his career at Vojvodina. He spent a brief period at Bologna youth team, before returning to Novi Sad. In July 2022, Tanjga signed a four-year deal with Bundesliga club Mainz 05, where he was initially assigned to the youth team. Despite playing only a couple of games, Tanjga was crowned 2022–23 Under 19 Bundesliga champion with the club.

=== Vojvodina ===
On 1 July 2023, Tanjga returned to Novi Sad once again and signed a two-year deal with Vojvodina. His official debut for the club came on 6 December 2023, when he replaced Lazar Rosić in the 59th minute of the 3:0 away win at Mladost GAT, in the last 16 round of the 2023–24 Serbian Cup.

==== Loan to Mladost GAT ====
Tanjga started the 2024–25 season on loan at Mladost GAT. On 11 September 2024, he scored the only goal in 1:0 home win against Radnički Beograd in the preliminary round of the 2024–25 Serbian Cup. However, after clocking only additional 3 minutes as a substitute in a single game, he was recalled to Vojvodina.

== Career statistics ==
As of 23 July 2026

Club	Season	League			Cup		Continental		Total	
Club	Season	Division	Apps	Goals	Apps	Goals	Apps	Goals	Apps	Goals
Vojvodina	2023–24	Serbian SuperLiga	0	0	1	0	0	0	1	0
Vojvodina	2024–25	Serbian SuperLiga	4	0	0	0	0	0	4	0
Vojvodina	2025–26	Serbian SuperLiga	18	0	2	0	—		20	0
Vojvodina	2026–27	Serbian SuperLiga	1	0	0	0	1	0	2	0
Vojvodina	Total		23	0	3	0	1	0	27	0
Mladost GAT (loan)	2024–25	Serbian First League	1	0	1	1	—		2	1
Career total			24	0	4	1	1	0	29	1

== Personal life ==
His father is Miroslav Tanjga.
