= Milutin Vidosavljević =

Serbian footballer

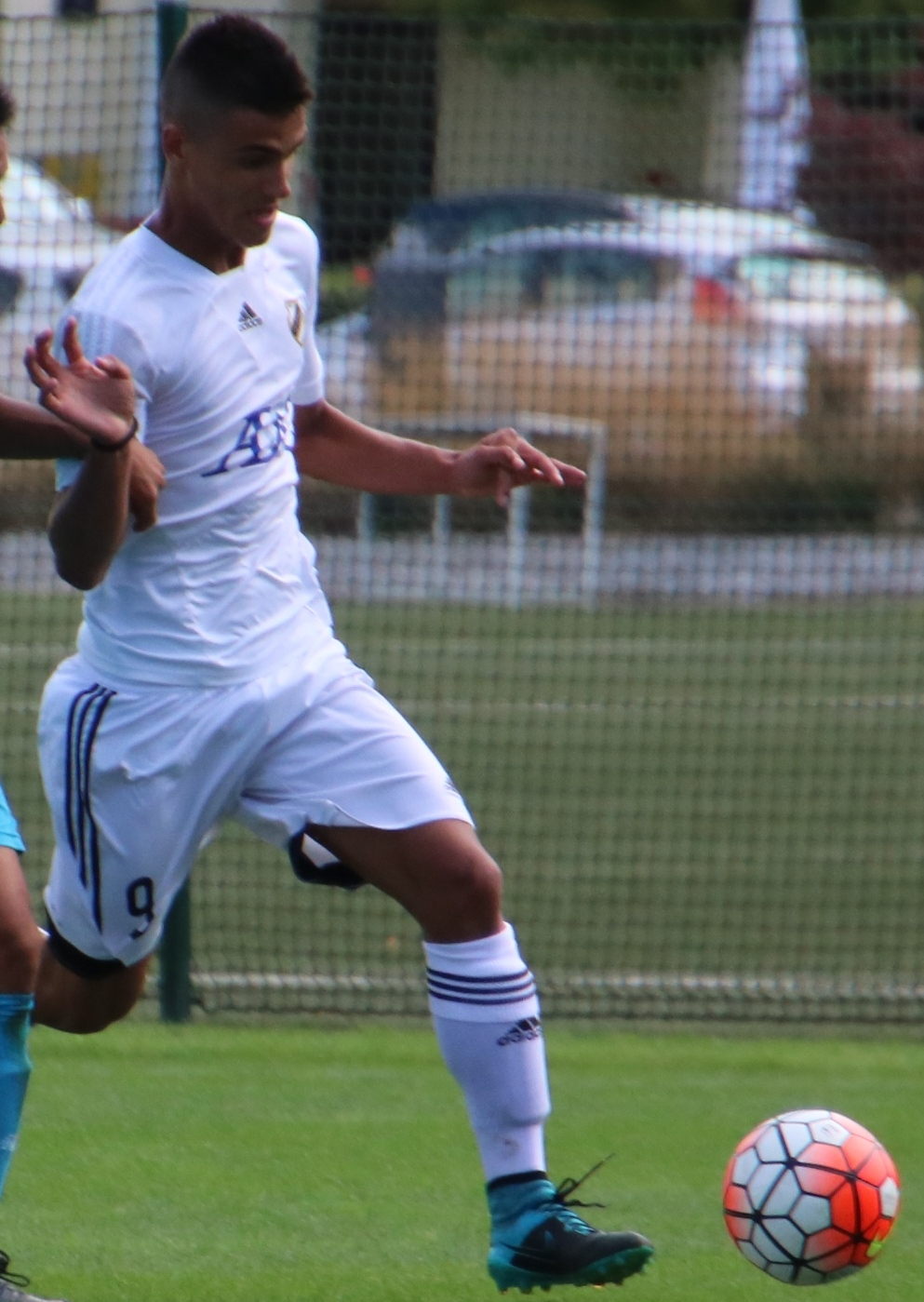
- Milutin Vidosavljević playing for Čukarički in 2016.

Personal information
- Date of birth: 21 February 2001 (age 25)
- Place of birth: Kuršumlija, Serbia, FR Yugoslavia
- Height: 1.80 m (5 ft 11 in)
- Positions: Attacking midfielder; forward; winger

Team information
- Current team: Akron Tolyatti (on loan from Vojvodina)
- Number: 55

Youth career
- 2015–2017: Čukarički

Senior career*
Years	Team	Apps	(Gls)
2017–2023	Čukarički	63	(7)
2021–2022	→ Levante B (loan)	7	(0)
2022–2023	→ Radnički 1923 (loan)	29	(7)
2023–2025	Radnički 1923	40	(16)
2025–	Vojvodina	34	(8)
2026–	→ Akron Tolyatti (loan)	2	(0)

International career^{‡}
2016–2018	Serbia U17	14	(4)
2018–2019	Serbia U19	6	(2)
2019–2021	Serbia U21	4	(0)
- * Club domestic league appearances and goals as of 17 October 2026 ‡ National team caps and goals as of 13 February 2024

Milutin Vidosavljević (Serbian Cyrillic: Милутин Видосављевић; born 21 February 2001) is a Serbian professional footballer who plays as a winger for Russian Premier League club Akron Tolyatti on loan from Vojvodina.

== Club career ==
Born in Kuršumlija, Vidosavljević started out at Kosanica. He joined the youth academy of Čukarički in 2015. Vidosavljević made his senior debut for the club on 24 September 2017, coming off the bench for Samuel Owusu in a 2–0 home league win over Borac Čačak.

In July 2021, Vidosavljević moved on a season-long loan to Levante with an option to buy, being immediately assigned to the reserves.

In June 2022, Vidosavljević was loaned to Radnički 1923. He finished the season as the team's top scorer with seven goals. In August 2023, Vidosavljević returned to Radnički 1923, penning a three-year contract with the club.

On 11 September 2026, he was loaned by Akron Tolyatti in Russia, with an option to buy.

== International career ==
Vidosavljević represented Serbia in two UEFA European Under-17 Championship tournaments, in 2017 and 2018.

== Career statistics ==
As of 28 October 2026

Appearances and goals by club, season and competition
Club	Season	League			Cup		Continental		Total	
Club	Season	Division	Apps	Goals	Apps	Goals	Apps	Goals	Apps	Goals
Čukarički	2017–18	Serbian SuperLiga	2	0	0	0	—		2	0
Čukarički	2018–19	Serbian SuperLiga	11	1	1	1	—		12	2
Čukarički	2019–20	Serbian SuperLiga	24	3	3	0	3 (Note: Appearances in UEFA Europa League)	0	30	3
Čukarički	2020–21	Serbian SuperLiga	26	3	1	1	—		27	4
Čukarički	Total		63	7	5	2	3	0	71	9
Levante B (loan)	2021–22	Segunda División RFEF	7	0	—		—		7	0
Radnički 1923 (loan)	2022–23	Serbian SuperLiga	29	7	0	0	—		29	7
Radnički 1923	2023–24	Serbian SuperLiga	26	11	2	1	—		28	12
Radnički 1923	2024–25	Serbian SuperLiga	12	5	0	0	2 (Note: Appearances in UEFA Conference League)	0	14	5
Radnički 1923	2025–26	Serbian SuperLiga	2	0	0	0	2	0	4	0
Radnički 1923	Total		69	23	2	1	4	0	75	24
Vojvodina	2025–26	Serbian SuperLiga	29	8	4	3	—		33	11
Vojvodina	2026–27	Serbian SuperLiga	5	0	—		4 (Note: Two appearances in UEFA Europa League, two appearances in UEFA Conference League)	0	9	0
Vojvodina	Total		34	8	4	3	4	0	42	11
Akron Tolyatti (loan)	2026–27	Russian Premier League	2	0	2	0	—		4	0
Career total			175	38	13	6	11	0	199	44

== Honors ==
- Serbian SuperLiga Player of the Week: 2023–24 (Round 33)
