= Vasilije Novičić =

Serbian footballer (born 2008)

Personal information
- Date of birth: 7 May 2008 (age 18)
- Place of birth: District of Mitrovica, Kosovo, Serbia
- Height: 1.83 m (6 ft 0 in)
- Position: Midfielder

Team information
- Current team: IMT
- Number: 22

Youth career
- –2023: FK Kosmet
- 2023–2024: FK Ole
- 2024–2025: IMT

Senior career*
| Years | Team | Apps | (Gls) |
| 2024– | IMT | 56 | (9) |

International career^{‡}
| 2024–2025 | Serbia U17 | 6 | (0) |
| 2025 | Serbia U18 | 1 | (0) |
| 2025– | Serbia U19 | 9 | (0) |
- * Club domestic league appearances and goals as of 13 June 2026 ‡ National team caps and goals as of 31 March 2026

Vasilije Novičić (Serbian Cyrillic: Василије Новичић; born 7 May 2008) is a Serbian professional footballer who plays as a midfielder for IMT. He represents Serbia at youth level.

== Early life ==
Novičić was born on 7 May 2008. Born in Kosovo, he is a native of District of Mitrovica, Kosovo.

== Club career ==
As a youth player, Novičić joined the youth academy of Kosovan side FK Kosmet from Leposaviq. Following his stint there, he joined the youth academy of Serbian side FK Ole in 2023. One year later, he joined the youth academy of Serbian side IMT and was promoted to the club's senior team the same year, where he captained them.

== International career ==
Novičić is a Serbia youth international. During the autumn of 2025 and the spring of 2026, he played for the Serbia national under-19 football team for 2026 UEFA European Under-19 Championship qualification.

== Style of play ==
Novičić plays as a midfielder. Serbian news website wrote in 2025 that he is "full of energy, youthfully agile with a strong sense of play".
