= Marko Veličković =

Serbian footballer

Personal information
- Date of birth: 12 October 2004 (age 22)
- Place of birth: Niš, Serbia and Montenegro
- Height: 1.79 m (5 ft 10 in)
- Position: Attacking midfielder

Team information
- Current team: Vojvodina
- Number: 8

Youth career
- –2021: Real Niš
- 2021–2023: Mladost Lučani

Senior career*
Years	Team	Apps	(Gls)
2021–2024	Mladost Lučani	31	(6)
2024–	Vojvodina	51	(10)

International career^{‡}
2019	Serbia U16	3	(0)
2024–	Serbia U21	6	(1)
- * Club domestic league appearances and goals as of 22 November 2026 ‡ National team caps and goals as of 5 October 2026

Marko Veličković (Serbian Cyrillic: Марко Величковић; born 12 October 2004) is a Serbian professional footballer who plays as a midfielder for Serbian SuperLiga club Vojvodina.

== Club career ==
=== Mladost Lučani ===
Veličković joined youth ranks of Mladost in 2021, after impressing in youth categories of his hometown club Real Niš. In following season he made a first-team debut on 23 September 2021 in 2:0 home loss to Partizan

=== Vojvodina ===
On 3 June 2024, Veličković signed a four-year deal with Vojvodina, for an estimated transfer fee of €400,000 making him, at the time, the second most expensive signing in the club's history.

== Career statistics ==
As of 22 November 2026

Club	Season	League			Cup		Continental		Total	
Club	Season	Division	Apps	Goals	Apps	Goals	Apps	Goals	Apps	Goals
Mladost Lučani	2020–21	Serbian SuperLiga	0	0	–		–		0	0
Mladost Lučani	2021–22	Serbian SuperLiga	2	0	0	0	–		2	0
Mladost Lučani	2022–23	Serbian SuperLiga	2	0	1	0	–		3	0
Mladost Lučani	2023–24	Serbian SuperLiga	27	6	0	0	–		27	6
Mladost Lučani	Total		31	6	1	0	–		32	6
Vojvodina	2024–25	Serbian SuperLiga	19	4	2	0	2	0	23	4
Vojvodina	2025–26	Serbian SuperLiga	21	4	2	0	–		23	4
Vojvodina	2026–27	Serbian SuperLiga	11	2	–		0	0	11	2
Vojvodina	Total		51	10	4	0	2	0	57	10
Career total			82	16	5	0	2	0	89	16

== Honours ==
Individual

- Serbian SuperLiga Player of the Week: 2025–26 (Round 26)
