= John Mary =

Nigerian-Cameroonian footballer (born 1993)

Personal information
- Full name: John Mary Uzuegbunam Honi
- Date of birth: 9 March 1993 (age 33)
- Place of birth: Nnobi, Anambra, Nigeria
- Height: 1.81 m (5 ft 11 in)
- Position: Forward

Team information
- Current team: Mladost Lučani
- Number: 39

Youth career
- AS Fortuna

Senior career*
Years	Team	Apps	(Gls)
2012	Buriram United		
2012–2013	BCC		
2013–2014	Krabi		
2014	Prachuap		
2015–2016	Vojvodina	1	(0)
2016–2018	Rudar Velenje	46	(26)
2018–2019	Meizhou Hakka	43	(36)
2019–2022	Shenzhen FC	32	(20)
2021	→ Avispa Fukuoka (loan)	16	(5)
2022	Al-Shabab	6	(1)
2022–2023	Avispa Fukuoka	9	(0)
2023–2024	Çaykur Rizespor	16	(7)
2024	Manisa	12	(2)
2024	Meizhou Hakka	13	(6)
2025	Novi Pazar	12	(5)
2025–2026	Vojvodina	24	(6)
2026–	Mladost Lučani	1	(0)

International career
- Cameroon U20
2021	Cameroon	1	(0)
- * Club domestic league appearances and goals as of 19 July 2026

John Mary Uzuegbunam Honi (born 9 March 1993), commonly known as John Mary, is a professional footballer who plays as a forward for Serbian Superliga club Mladost Lučani. Born in Nigeria, he played for the Cameroon national team internationally.

== Club career ==
Born in the Anambra State in Nigeria, Mary moved to Cameroon to join AS Fortuna de Mfou Yaoundé's youth team. On 28 March 2012, he was signed by Buriram United in what will be the beginning of three seasons spent in Thai football. His time with Buriram only lasted for a few months before he moved to fourth tier side Bangkok Christian College on 1 August 2012. A move to second tier club Krabi for the 2013 Thai Division 1 League would follow before ending his time in Thailand with fourth tier club Prachuap.

His advisor Ognjen Karisik would bring him to Europe, where he had a trial with Serbian club Vojvodina who signed him on 24 January 2015 on a two-and-a-half-year contract. He made his debut in a Serbian Cup game against Kolubara on 28 October 2015 that ended in a goalless draw, before Vojvodina won 5–4 on penalties. He would see very little playing time with the club after suffering from an anterior cruciate ligament injury. His contract with Vojvodina was eventually terminated, and on 18 July 2016 he signed a one-year deal with Slovenian side Rudar Velenje.

In January 2018, Mary moved to the China League One side Meizhou Hakka. He made his debut and scored his first goal for the club in a league game against Shijiazhuang Ever Bright on 10 March 2018 that ended in a 2–1 defeat. After winning the golden boot award at the end of the 2018 China League One campaign, Chinese top tier club Shenzhen signed him on 2 July 2019 halfway through the 2019 Chinese Super League season.

On 30 January 2022, Mary joined Saudi Arabian club Al-Shabab.

== International career ==
Despite being born in Nigeria, Mary was naturalized and played for Cameroon under-20s.

In 2021, he was called to the Cameroon senior team. He made his debut on 6 September 2021 in a World Cup qualifier against the Ivory Coast, a 2–1 away loss. He substituted Moumi Ngamaleu in the 62nd minute.

== Career statistics ==
As of 19 July 2026

Appearances and goals by club, season and competition
Club	Season	League			National cup		League cup		Continental		Total	
Club	Season	Division	Apps	Goals	Apps	Goals	Apps	Goals	Apps	Goals	Apps	Goals
Vojvodina	2014–15	Serbian SuperLiga	0	0	0	0	—		0	0	0	0
Vojvodina	2015–16	Serbian SuperLiga	1	0	1	0	—		0	0	2	0
Vojvodina	Total		1	0	1	0	—		0	0	2	0
Rudar Velenje	2016–17	Slovenian PrvaLiga	30	17	4	1	—		—		34	18
Rudar Velenje	2017–18	Slovenian PrvaLiga	16	9	1	0	—		—		17	9
Rudar Velenje	Total		46	26	5	1	—		—		51	27
Meizhou Hakka	2018	China League One	28	24	0	0	—		—		28	24
Meizhou Hakka	2019	China League One	15	12	0	0	—		—		15	12
Meizhou Hakka	Total		43	36	0	0	—		—		43	36
Shenzhen FC	2019	Chinese Super League	15	9	0	0	—		—		15	9
Shenzhen FC	2020	Chinese Super League	17	11	0	0	—		—		17	11
Shenzhen FC	Total		32	20	0	0	—		—		32	20
Avispa Fukuoka (loan)	2021	J1 League	16	5	1	0	2	2	—		19	7
Al Shabab	2021–22	Saudi Pro League	6	1	1	0	—		2	1	9	2
Avispa Fukuoka	2022	J1 League	9	0	1	0	4	1	—		14	1
Çaykur Rizespor	2022–23	TFF 1. Lig	14	6	—		—		—		14	6
Çaykur Rizespor	2023–24	Süper Lig	2	1	0	0	—		—		2	1
Çaykur Rizespor	Total		16	7	0	0	—		—		16	7
Manisa	2023–24	TFF 1. Lig	12	2	1	0	—		—		13	2
Meizhou Hakka	2024	Chinese Super League	13	6	—		—		—		13	6
Novi Pazar	2024–25	Serbian SuperLiga	12	5	0	0	—		—		12	5
Vojvodina	2025–26	Serbian SuperLiga	24	6	4	0	—		—		28	6
Mladost Lučani	2026–27	Serbian SuperLiga	1	0	0	0	—		—		1	0
Career total			231	113	13	1	6	3	2	1	252	119

== Honours ==
Individual

- Slovenian PrvaLiga top scorer: 2016–17
- China League One top scorer: 2018
