= Njegoš Petrović =

Serbian footballer (born 1999)

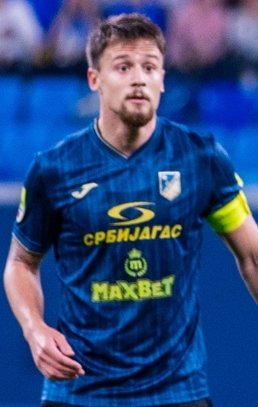
- Petrović in 2024

Personal information
- Full name: Njegoš Petrović
- Date of birth: 18 July 1999 (age 27)
- Place of birth: Krupanj, FR Yugoslavia
- Height: 1.85 m (6 ft 1 in)
- Position: Defensive midfielder

Team information
- Current team: Vojvodina
- Number: 18

Youth career
- Rađevac
- Rad

Senior career*
Years	Team	Apps	(Gls)
2016–2019	Rad	64	(3)
2019–2021	Red Star Belgrade	64	(2)
2022–2024	Granada	51	(0)
2024	→ Vojvodina (loan)	17	(4)
2024–	Vojvodina	82	(9)

International career^{‡}
2014–2015	Serbia U16	17	(1)
2015–2016	Serbia U17	17	(3)
2016–2018	Serbia U19	16	(1)
2018	Serbia U20	1	(0)
2019–2020	Serbia U21	9	(0)
2018	Serbia U23	1	(0)
2026–	Serbia	3	(0)
- * Club domestic league appearances and goals as of 22 November 2026 ‡ National team caps and goals as of 6 June 2026

Njegoš Petrović (Serbian Cyrillic: Његош Петровић; born 18 July 1999) is a Serbian professional footballer who plays as a defensive midfielder for Serbian SuperLiga club Vojvodina and the Serbia national team.

== Club career ==
=== Rad ===
Born in Krupanj, he started playing football with local club Rađevac and later moved to FK Rad, where he passed youth categories and signed a scholarship contract with club in 2014. Petrović was licensed with senior squad for the 2015–16 season, but he officially joined the first team in summer 2016, when he signed a four-year professional contract with Rad. Previously, he made his Serbian SuperLiga debut in fourth fixture match of the 2016–17 season on 10 August 2016 against Radnik Surdulica. After seven league matches which he started from the bench and the whole cup match against Dinamo Vranje, Petrović started his first league match on the field and played the whole game against Borac Čačak in 13th fixture of the 2016–17 season.

=== Red Star Belgrade ===
In August 2019, Petrović signed a four-year contract with Red Star Belgrade in a €400,000 transfer from Rad. Red Star's sports director Mitar Mrkela commented that "Petrović is the best player in [his] position in Serbia". He made his debut for Red Star on 9 August 2019 in a 2–0 win against Mladost Lučani under coach Vladan Milojević.

=== Granada ===
In January 2022, Petrović signed a 4 1/2-year contract with Granada in a €1,500,000 transfer from Red Star.

==== Loan to Vojvodina ====
On 15 January 2024, Petrović was loaned to Serbian club Vojvodina until the end of the season, with the option to buy.

=== Vojvodina ===
On 19 April 2024, Vojvodina made the loan transfer of Petrović permanent, for a reported transfer fee of €800,000. Petrović signed a three-year contract with the club. The move became official on 29 May 2024.

== International career ==
Petrović was a member of Serbia U16 and Serbia U17 squads between 2014 and 2016. In August 2016, Petrović was called into Serbia U19 squad for memorial tournament "Stevan Vilotić – Ćele", where he debuted in opening match against United States. Petrović suffered an anterior cruciate ligament injury during the match against Sweden, played on 14 November 2016.

== Personal life ==
On 22 June 2020 he tested positive for COVID-19.

== Career statistics ==
=== Club ===
As of 22 November 2026

Appearances and goals by club, season and competition
Club	Season	League			Cup		Continental		Total	
Club	Season	Division	Apps	Goals	Apps	Goals	Apps	Goals	Apps	Goals
Rad	2015–16	Serbian SuperLiga	0	0	0	0	—		0	0
Rad	2016–17	Serbian SuperLiga	9	0	1	0	—		10	0
Rad	2017–18	Serbian SuperLiga	25	2	1	0	—		26	2
Rad	2017–18	Serbian SuperLiga	28	1	0	0	—		28	1
Rad	2018–19	Serbian SuperLiga	2	0	0	0	—		2	0
Rad	Total		64	3	2	0	0	0	66	3
Red Star	2019–20	Serbian SuperLiga	17	1	2	0	6	0	25	1
Red Star	2020–21	Serbian SuperLiga	35	1	2	0	10	1	47	2
Red Star	2021–22	Serbian SuperLiga	12	0	1	0	2	0	15	0
Red Star	Total		64	2	5	0	18	1	87	3
Granada	2021–22	La Liga	15	0	—		—		15	0
Granada	2022–23	Segunda División	26	0	1	0	—		27	0
Granada	2023–24	La Liga	10	0	1	0	—		11	0
Granada	Total		51	0	2	0	0	0	53	0
Vojvodina (loan)	2023–24	Serbian SuperLiga	17	4	3	0	—		20	4
Vojvodina	2024–25	Serbian SuperLiga	33	5	5	0	4	0	42	5
Vojvodina	2025–26	Serbian SuperLiga	33	4	2	0	—		36	4
Vojvodina	2026–27	Serbian SuperLiga	16	0	1	0	4	0	21	0
Vojvodina	Total		99	13	12	0	8	0	119	13
Career total			278	18	21	0	26	1	325	19

=== International ===
As of match played 5 June 2026

Appearances and goals by national team and year
National team	Year	Apps	Goals
Serbia	2026	3	0
Total		3	0

== Honours ==
Red Star Belgrade

- Serbian SuperLiga: 2019–20, 2020–21
- Serbian Cup: 2020–21

Granada

- Segunda División: 2022–23

Individual

- Serbian SuperLiga Player of the Week: 2024–25 (Round 25)
