= Uroš Filipović =

Serbian footballer

Personal information
- Full name: Uroš Filipović
- Date of birth: 22 April 1998 (age 28)
- Place of birth: Belgrade, FR Yugoslavia
- Height: 1.80 m (5 ft 11 in)
- Positions: Defensive midfielder; left-back

Team information
- Current team: Vranić

Youth career
- 2008–2016: Red Star Belgrade
- 2016–2017: Radnički Pirot

Senior career*
Years	Team	Apps	(Gls)
2017–2018	Radnički Pirot	29	(2)
2018–2019	Sloboda Užice	26	(0)
2019–2020	Omladinac Novi Banovci		
2020	Podunavac Belegiš		
2021–2024	Karađorđe Mišar		
2024-	Vranić		
- * Club domestic league appearances and goals as of 13 July 2018

Uroš Filipović (Serbian Cyrillic: Урош Филиповић; born 22 April 1998) is a Serbian footballer, who plays for FK Vranić.

== Club career ==
=== Radnički Pirot ===
Born in Belgrade, Filipović passed Red Star Belgrade youth categories, playing as a member of the club for 8 years until the end of 2015–16 season. He was elected in youth ranks under Football Association of Belgrade in his early years. Next he left Red Star Belgrade, Filipović completed his youth career playing with Radnički Pirot.

In summer 2016, Filipović joined Radnički Pirot. After he spent the first half-season playing with youth team, Filipović joined the first team of the club at the beginning of 2017 under coach Marjan Živković. He made his senior debut in 19 fixture away match of the 2016–17 Serbian First League season, played against Mačva Šabac on 25 March 2017. He also appeared several times in the rest of a season. Filipović scored his first goal for Radnički Pirot in 3–1 victory over Jagodina on 15 October 2017. Scoring from the middle of the field in 5th second of the game, Filipović scored the one of fastest goals in the Serbian football. He also scored in 7–2 cup defeat against Napredak Kruševac on 25 October 2017, from penalty kick.

== Style of play ==
During the time he spent in youth ranks, Filipović moulded himself as a utility player. He has started playing football as a forward, but moving through the youth categories, he changed his position a lot. Due to creative abilities, he gradually moved to the middle of the field. In last years playing with Red Star Belgrade youth teams, Filipović was mostly used as a defensive midfielder or creative playmaker, also having a role as a left-back. Finally, he started his senior career at the same position, playing with Radnički Pirot in the Serbian First League. Filipović has confirmed as a long ranger, and he is also an accurate penalty taker.

== Career statistics ==
=== Club ===
As of 13 July 2018

Appearances and goals by club, season and competition
Club	Season	League			Cup		Continental		Other		Total	
Club	Season	Division	Apps	Goals	Apps	Goals	Apps	Goals	Apps	Goals	Apps	Goals
Radnički Pirot	2016–17	First League	8	0	—		—		—		8	0
Radnički Pirot	2017–18	First League	22	2	2	1	—		—		24	3
Radnički Pirot	Total		30	2	2	1	—		—		32	3
