= Petar Sukačev =

Serbian footballer

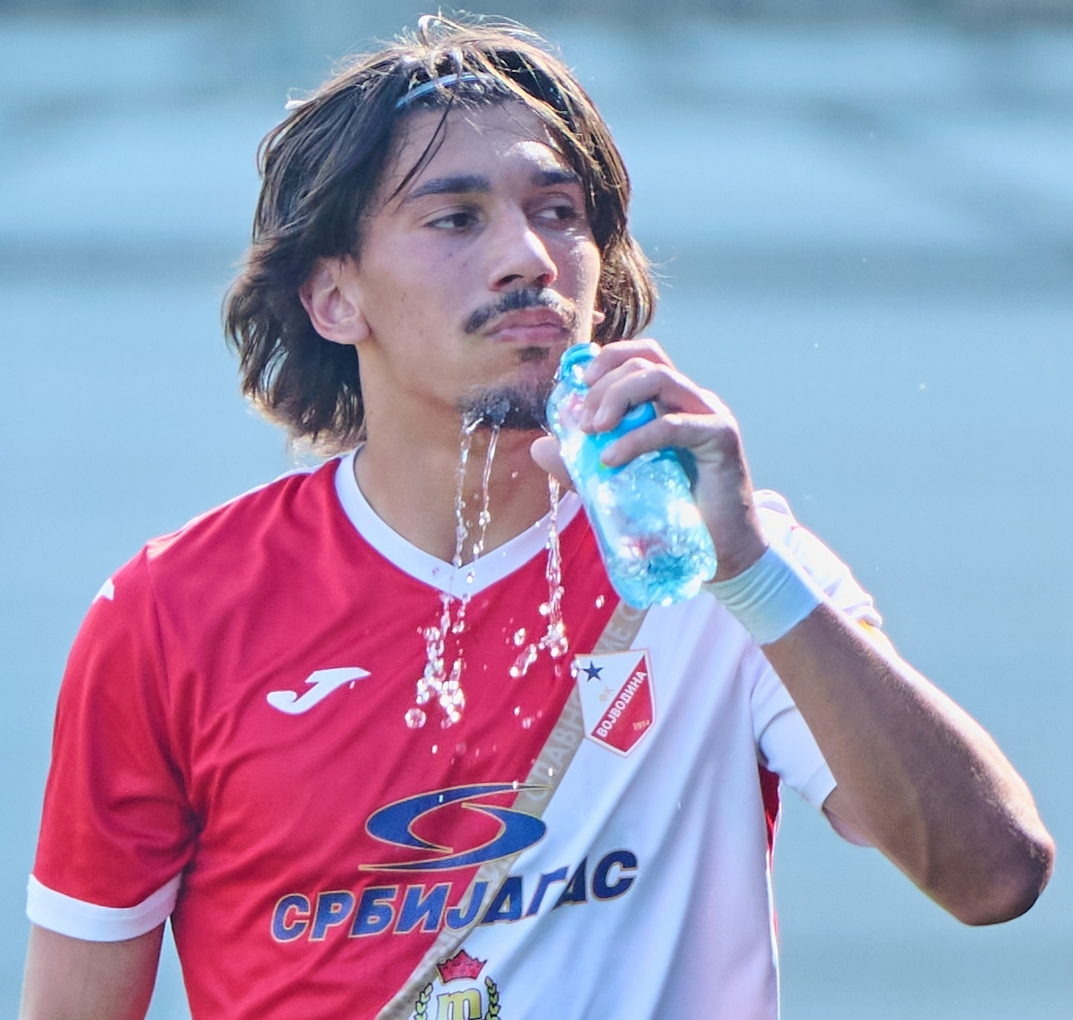
- Sukačev in 2025

Personal information
- Date of birth: 28 August 2005 (age 21)
- Place of birth: Kilchberg, Switzerland
- Height: 1.73 m (5 ft 8 in)
- Positions: Winger; left back

Team information
- Current team: Vojvodina
- Number: 27

Youth career
- –2017: Viola Ćuprija
- 2017–2018: Morava Ćuprija
- 2018–2020: Red Star Belgrade
- 2021–2022: GFK Jagodina
- 2022–2024: Vojvodina

Senior career*
Years	Team	Apps	(Gls)
2022	GFK Jagodina	12	(3)
2022–	Vojvodina	35	(5)
2024–2026	→ Kabel (loan)	31	(7)

International career^{‡}
2022	Serbia U18	2	(0)
2026–	Serbia	3	(0)
- * Club domestic league appearances and goals as of 22 November 2026 ‡ National team caps and goals as of 16 November 2026

Petar Sukačev (Serbian Cyrillic: Петар Сукачев; born 28 August 2005) is a professional footballer who plays as a forward for Serbian SuperLiga club Vojvodina and the Serbia national football team. Born in Switzerland, he plays for the Serbian national football team.

== Biography ==
Sukačev started his career with Jagodina before moving to Vojvodina in 2022. He looks up to teammate Lucas Barros and maintains a good relationship with him, praising him for his advice.

In October 2022, Sukačev signed his first professional contract with Vojvodina that lasted three years. On 4 August 2024, he made his senior debut, playing 56 minutes in 3–1 away loss against Čukarički. On 1 August 2025, Sukačev signed a contract extension with the club until the end of 2028–29 season.

On 17 September 2026, Sukačev received his first call-up to the Serbian senior team by coach Veljko Paunović for 2026–27 UEFA Nations League matches. On 24 September, he made his international debut for the Serbian senior team at said tournament against Greece.

== Career statistics ==
As of 22 November 2026

Club	Season	League			Cup		Continental		Total	
Club	Season	Division	Apps	Goals	Apps	Goals	Apps	Goals	Apps	Goals
GFK Jagodina	2021–22	Serbian League East	12	3	–		–		12	3
Vojvodina	2023–24	Serbian SuperLiga	0	0	0	0	0	0	0	0
Vojvodina	2024–25	Serbian SuperLiga	3	0	0	0	0	0	3	0
Vojvodina	2025–26	Serbian SuperLiga	17	2	3	1	–		20	3
Vojvodina	2026–27	Serbian SuperLiga	15	3	1	0	3	1	19	4
Vojvodina	Total		35	5	4	1	3	1	42	7
Kabel (loan)	2024–25	Serbian League Vojvodina	17	6	–		–		17	6
Kabel (loan)	2025–26	Serbian First League	14	1	–		–		14	1
Kabel (loan)	Total		31	7	0	0	–		31	7
Career total			78	15	4	1	3	1	85	17

=== International ===
As of match played 16 November 2026

Appearances and goals by national team and year
National team	Year	Apps	Goals
Serbia	2026	3	0
Total		3	0
