= Dragan Kokanović =

Serbian footballer

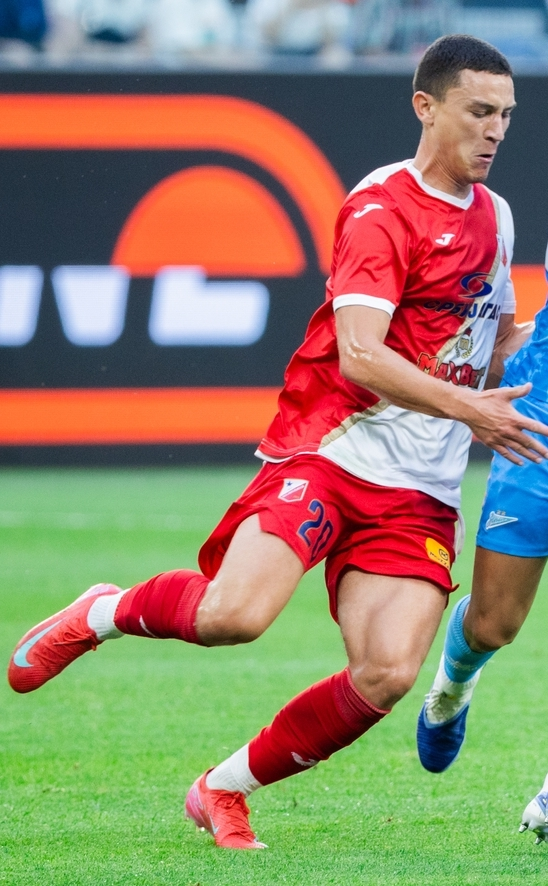

Personal information
- Full name: Dragan Kokanović
- Date of birth: 1 May 2002 (age 24)
- Place of birth: Šabac, FR Yugoslavia
- Height: 1.80 m (5 ft 11 in)
- Position: Midfielder

Team information
- Current team: Vojvodina
- Number: 20

Youth career
- –2019: Red Star Belgrade
- 2018: → Grafičar (loan)
- 2019–2021: Vojvodina

Senior career*
Years	Team	Apps	(Gls)
2021–	Vojvodina	73	(12)
2022–2023	→ Kabel (loan)	38	(10)
2023–2024	→ Mladost GAT (loan)	32	(7)
- * Club domestic league appearances and goals as of 8 November 2026

Dragan Kokanović (Serbian Cyrillic: Драган Кокановић; born 1 May 2002) is a Serbian professional footballer who plays as a midfielder for Vojvodina.

== Club career ==
=== Vojvodina ===
Kokanović is a product of Vojvodina youth academy. His debut for the first team came under coach Nenad Lalatović, on 12 April 2021, replacing Miodrag Gemović, in 2:1 home win against Zlatibor Čajetina. In July 2022, Kokanović signed a new three-year deal with the club. On 13 September 2024, Kokanović extended his contract with the club until 2027. On 14 August 2025, he signed a contract extension with the club until the summer of 2029.

==== Loan to Kabel ====
Kokanović spent season and a half on loan at Kabel.

==== Loan to Mladost GAT ====
He spent the entire 2023–24 season on loan at Mladost GAT in Serbian First League, where he helped the team avoid the relegation. He started the 2024–25 on loan at Mladost GAT as well, but was recalled to Vojvodina.
