= Aleksa Vukanović =

Serbian footballer

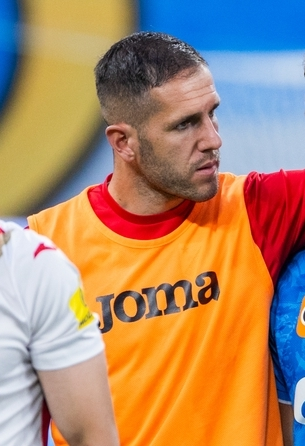

Personal information
- Full name: Aleksa Vukanović
- Date of birth: 18 June 1992 (age 34)
- Place of birth: Bačka Palanka, FR Yugoslavia
- Height: 1.89 m (6 ft 2 in)
- Position: Forward

Team information
- Current team: Vojvodina
- Number: 9

Youth career
- Hercegovac Gajdobra

Senior career*
Years	Team	Apps	(Gls)
2010–2014	ČSK Čelarevo	94	(18)
2014–2015	OFK Bačka	22	(2)
2015–2016	ČSK Čelarevo	25	(11)
2016–2019	Napredak Kruševac	90	(29)
2019–2022	Red Star Belgrade	55	(11)
2022	Meizhou Hakka	26	(9)
2023	Umm Salal	4	(1)
2023–	Vojvodina	77	(15)
- * Club domestic league appearances and goals as of 22 November 2026

Aleksa Vukanović (Serbian Cyrillic: Алекса Вукановић; born 18 June 1992) is a Serbian professional footballer who plays as a forward for Serbian SuperLiga club Vojvodina.

== Club career ==
=== Early career ===
Vukanović started his career with hometown team Hercegovac. Later he moved to ČSK Čelarevo, where he played in the Serbian League Vojvodina between 2010 and 2014. In summer 2014, he moved to OFK Bačka, where he made Serbian First League debut against Sloga Kraljevo on 23 August 2014. Next summer, Vukanović returned to ČSK after club promotion in the First League.

=== Napredak ===
Vukanović joined Napredak Kruševac in summer 2016. On 22 July 2016, he scored a goal in his debut for Napredak in a 2–2 tie against Red Star Belgrade. On 27 October 2018, he scored a goal with his heel in a 1–1 tie against Partizan. By November that year, he was the top scorer in the entire league.

=== Red Star Belgrade ===
On 18 January 2019, Vukanović signed a three-year contract with Red Star Belgrade. On 27 August 2019, he scored a goal in the Champions League play-off in a 1–1 tie against Young Boys, which resulted in Red Star's qualification to the Champions League that season.

=== Meizhou Hakka ===
On 21 April 2022, Vukanović joined Chinese Super League club Meizhou Hakka.

=== Brief spell at Umm Salal and return to Serbia ===
After a short spell at Qatar Stars League club Umm Salal, Vukanović returned to Serbia, and on 15 September 2023 he signed a two-year deal with Vojvodina. On 30 November 2023, Vukanović signed a new three-year deal with the club.

== Career statistics ==
As of 22 November 2026

Appearances and goals by club, season and competition
Club	Season	League			Cup		Continental		Other		Total	
Club	Season	Division	Apps	Goals	Apps	Goals	Apps	Goals	Apps	Goals	Apps	Goals
OFK Bačka	2014–15	Serbian First League	22	2	0	0	—		—		22	2
ČSK Čelarevo	2015–16	Serbian First League	25	11	1	0	—		—		26	11
Napredak Kruševac	2016–17	Serbian SuperLiga	34	10	1	1	—		—		35	11
Napredak Kruševac	2017–18	Serbian SuperLiga	36	7	3	1	—		—		39	8
Napredak Kruševac	2018–19	Serbian SuperLiga	20	12	2	1	—		—		22	13
Napredak Kruševac	Total		90	29	6	3	—		0	0	96	32
Red Star	2018–19	Serbian SuperLiga	10	2	3	0	—		—		13	2
Red Star	2019–20	Serbian SuperLiga	20	6	4	1	11	1	—		35	8
Red Star	2020–21	Serbian SuperLiga	21	3	4	1	5	0	—		30	4
Red Star	2021–22	Serbian SuperLiga	4	0	1	0	0	0	—		5	0
Red Star	Total		55	11	12	2	16	1	0	0	83	14
Meizhou Hakka	2022	Chinese Super League	26	9	1	0	—		—		27	9
Umm Salal	2022–23	Qatar Stars League	4	1	0	0	—		—		4	1
Vojvodina	2023–24	Serbian SuperLiga	29	7	4	2	—		—		33	9
Vojvodina	2024–25	Serbian SuperLiga	4	1	1	0	2	0	—		7	1
Vojvodina	2025–26	Serbian SuperLiga	34	7	3	1	—		—		37	8
Vojvodina	2026–27	Serbian SuperLiga	10	0	0	0	3	0	—		13	0
Vojvodina	Total		77	15	8	3	5	0	—		90	18
Career total			299	79	28	8	21	1	0	0	348	88

== Honours ==
Red Star Belgrade

- Serbian SuperLiga: 2018–19, 2019–20, 2020–21
- Serbian Cup: 2020–21
