= Vando Félix =

Bissau-Guinean footballer

Personal information
- Full name: Vando Baifas Félix
- Date of birth: 3 September 2002 (age 24)
- Place of birth: Bissau, Guinea-Bissau
- Height: 1.79 m (5 ft 10 in)
- Position: Winger

Team information
- Current team: Torreense
- Number: 90

Senior career*
Years	Team	Apps	(Gls)
2021	Leixões	4	(0)
2021–2024	Sporting CP B	60	(7)
2024–2025	Torreense	12	(4)
2025–2026	Vitória de Guimarães	24	(0)
2026	→ Vojvodina (loan)	8	(0)
2026–	Torreense	1	(0)

International career^{‡}
2025–	Guinea-Bissau	1	(0)
- * Club domestic league appearances and goals as of 11 September 2026 ‡ National team caps and goals as of 19:42, 20 March 2025 (UTC)

Vando Baifas Félix (born 3 September 2002) is a Bissau-Guinean professional footballer who plays as a winger for Liga Portugal 2 club Torreense and the Guinea-Bissau national team.

== Club career ==
Having started his career with Leixões, in the summer of 2021, Félix joined Sporting CP's B team, competing in Liga 3.

In July 2024, he signed a two-year contract with Liga Portugal 2 side Torreense. Six months later, he moved to Primeira Liga club Vitória de Guimarães, signing a contract until 2029 for a reported fee of €1.2 million.

On 27 January 2026, Vitória de Guimarães sent Félix on loan to Serbian SuperLiga club Vojvodina until the end of the 2025–26 season, with an optional buy-clause.

== International career ==
Félix was called up to the Guinea-Bissau national team for a set of 2026 FIFA World Cup qualification matches in March 2025.

== Career statistics ==
As of 8 March 2026

Appearances and goals by club, season and competition
Club	Season	League			National Cup		Continental		Total	
Club	Season	Division	Apps	Goals	Apps	Goals	Apps	Goals	Apps	Goals
Leixões	2020–21	Liga Portugal 2	4	0	–		–		4	0
Sporting CP B	2021–22	Liga 3	25	3	–		–		25	3
Sporting CP B	2022–23	Liga 3	14	2	–		–		14	2
Sporting CP B	2023–24	Liga 3	21	2	–		–		21	2
Sporting CP B	Total		60	7	–		–		60	7
Torreense	2024–25	Liga Portugal 2	12	4	1	0	–		13	4
Vitória de Guimarães	2024–25	Primeira Liga	16	0	–		–		16	0
Vitória de Guimarães	2025–26	Primeira Liga	8	0	0	0	–		8	0
Vitória de Guimarães	Total		24	0	0	0	–		24	0
Vojvodina (loan)	2025–26	Serbian SuperLiga	8	0	3	0	–		11	0
Career total			108	11	4	0	0	0	112	11

== Honours ==
Vitória SC

- Taça da Liga: 2025–26
