= 2024–25 Serbian First League =

Serbian football league season

Serbian First League
- Season: 2024–25
- Dates: 2 August 2024 – 4 April 2025
- Champions: Radnik (2nd title)
- Promoted: Radnik; Javor-Matis
- Relegated: GFK Sloboda; Inđija Toyo Tires
- Matches: 177
- Goals: 369 (2.08 per match)
- Top goalscorer: Luka Ratković (18 goals)
- All statistics correct as of 25 May 2025.

The 2024–25 Serbian First League is the 20th season of the Serbian First League since its establishment.

== League format ==
The league consist of 16 teams: ten teams from the previous season, two teams relegated from 2023–24 Serbian SuperLiga and four new teams promoted from Serbian League. Each team will play each other twice in round-robin format after which top half will play in Promotion round and bottom half in Relegation round Play-offs. First two teams from the Promotion round will be promoted to next season of Serbian Superliga, while third and fourth team will play in a Relegation Play-off. Last four teams from Relegation round will be relegated.

== Teams ==
Location of teams in the 2024–25 Serbian First league

Team	City	Stadium	Capacity
Borac 1926	Čačak	Čačak Stadium	8,000
GFK Dubočica	Leskovac	Dubočica Stadium	8,136
RFK Grafičar	Belgrade	South artificial grass field of - Rajko Mitić Stadium	1,000
Inđija Toyo Tires	Inđija	TOYO Tires Arena	4,000
Javor-Matis	Ivanjica	Stadion kraj Moravice	5,000
Mačva	Šabac	Stadion FK Mačva Šabac	5,500
Mladost GAT	Novi Sad	GAT Arena	1,400
Radnik	Surdulica	Surdulica City Stadium	3,312
Radnički (SM)	Sremska Mitrovica	Fudbalska Akademija	1,000
GFK Sloboda	Užice	Radomir Antić Stadium	9,949
Sloven	Ruma	Stadion Sloven	1,000
Smederevo 1924	Smederevo	Smederevo Stadium	17,200
Trayal	Kruševac	Mladost Stadium	10,331
Voždovac	Belgrade	Voždovac Stadium	5,200
OFK Vršac	Vršac	Gradski stadion Vršac	5,000
Zemun	Belgrade	Zemun Stadium	9,600

== Regular season ==
=== League table ===
Pos	Team	Pld	W	D	L	GF	GA	GD	Pts	Qualification
1	Radnik	30	18	8	4	48	12	+36	62	Qualification for the Championship round
2	Javor-Matis	30	14	11	5	31	19	+12	53	Qualification for the Championship round
3	Mačva	30	15	8	7	36	21	+15	53	Qualification for the Championship round
4	Mladost GAT	30	13	13	4	28	20	+8	52	Qualification for the Championship round
5	Voždovac	30	12	10	8	30	21	+9	46	Qualification for the Championship round
6	Borac 1926	30	12	9	9	39	35	+4	45	Qualification for the Championship round
7	RFK Grafičar	30	11	10	9	39	38	+1	43	Qualification for the Championship round
8	OFK Vršac	30	11	9	10	28	29	−1	42	Qualification for the Championship round
9	Zemun	30	9	13	8	35	29	+6	40	Qualification for the Relegation round
10	Radnički (SM)	30	7	14	9	22	27	−5	35	Qualification for the Relegation round
11	GFK Dubočica	30	7	10	13	35	49	−14	31	Qualification for the Relegation round
12	Smederevo 1924	30	7	10	13	23	37	−14	31	Qualification for the Relegation round
13	Sloven	30	6	12	12	27	40	−13	30	Qualification for the Relegation round
14	Trayal	30	8	7	15	30	39	−9	28 (Note: Trayal Kruševac were deducted Three points.)	Qualification for the Relegation round
15	Inđija Toyo Tires	30	5	9	16	26	43	−17	24	Qualification for the Relegation round
16	GFK Sloboda	30	4	9	17	18	36	−18	21	Qualification for the Relegation round

Source: PrvaLiga (in Serbian)
Rules for classification: 1) Points; 2) Head-to-head points; 3) Head-to-head goal difference; 4) Head-to-head goals scored; 5) Head-to-head away goals scored (if two teams tied); 6) Goal difference; 7) Goals scored; 8) Fair play ranking; 9) Draw.

=== Results ===
Home \ Away	JAV	MNS	MAČ	RAD	VRŠ	VOŽ	BOR	GRA	ZEM	SME	RSM	TRA	INĐ	SLR	DUB	SLO
Javor-Matis										2–0			1–0	0–0		1–0
Mladost GAT	1–0		1–1			0–0								2–0		1–0
Mačva	0–2			1–0	5–1	3–1		2–0	0–0						4–0	
Radnik	2–0	3–0			1–1	1–0	4–0		1–1	0–0	0–0			1–0		
OFK Vršac	0–0	1–1						0–1				2–0	0–2			1–0
Voždovac				1–3						0–1	1–1		2–0	5–0		2–0
Borac 1926			2–0		3–1	1–0		2–1			1–0	4–0	2–1		1–1	
RFK Grafičar	1–1			1–0	1–1					2–0	0–0			2–0		3–1
Zemun	0–0	0–2	0–2					2–0				1–0			1–4	
Smederevo 1924	0–0		1–2		0–2		3–2		1–1		2–0		0–0			
Radnički (SM)		1–1	0–1				0–0					1–0			0–0	
Trayal	1–3	0–1				1–0		2–4							1–2	
Inđija Toyo Tires		1–3							0–0			1–2			2–4	
Sloven							0–0		1–1		3–2		1–1			1–4
GFK Dubočica	1–1	1–1	2–2	1–1		0–3		1–3						2–3		
GFK Sloboda									3–0	2–1	1–1	1–1	0–2			

Updated to match(es) played on 26 March 2025. Source: PrvaLiga (in Serbian)
Legend: Blue = home team win; Yellow = draw; Red = away team win.
For upcoming matches, an "a" indicates there is an article about the rivalry between the two participants.

== Play-offs ==
=== Championship round ===
The top eight teams advanced from the regular season. Teams played each other once.

==== League table ====
Pos	Team	Pld	W	D	L	GF	GA	GD	Pts	Qualification
1	Radnik (C, P)	37	23	9	5	64	19	+45	78	Promotion to the Serbian SuperLiga
2	Javor-Matis (P)	37	19	12	6	44	25	+19	69	Promotion to the Serbian SuperLiga
3	Mladost GAT	37	17	14	6	43	31	+12	65	Qualification for play-off
4	Mačva	37	16	9	12	40	33	+7	57	Qualification for play-off
5	Voždovac	37	14	13	10	38	29	+9	55	
6	RFK Grafičar	37	13	14	10	49	49	0	53	
7	OFK Vršac	37	13	10	14	34	39	−5	49	
8	Borac 1926	37	13	9	15	46	49	−3	48	

Source: PrvaLiga (in Serbian)
Rules for classification: 1) Points; 2) Points in regular season; 3) Head-to-head points in regular season; 4) Head-to-head goal difference in regular season; 5) Head-to-head goals scored in regular season; 6) Head-to-head away goals scored in regular season (if two teams tied); 7) Goal difference; 8) Goals scored; 9) Fair play ranking; 10) Drawing of lots.
(C) Champions; (P) Promoted

=== Relegations round ===
The bottom eight teams advanced from the regular season. Teams played each other once.

==== League table ====
Pos	Team	Pld	W	D	L	GF	GA	GD	Pts	Qualification
9	Zemun	37	11	15	11	46	44	+2	48	
10	Trayal	37	13	9	15	45	44	+1	45 (Note: Trayal Kruševac were deducted Three points.)	
11	GFK Dubočica	37	10	11	16	43	57	−14	41	
12	Smederevo 1924	37	10	11	16	31	47	−16	41	
13	Radnički (SM) (R)	37	8	16	13	29	35	−6	40	Relegation to Serbian League
14	Sloven (R)	37	8	15	14	31	44	−13	39	Relegation to Serbian League
15	Inđija Toyo Tires (R)	37	7	11	19	33	52	−19	32	Relegation to Serbian League
16	GFK Sloboda (R)	37	7	10	20	23	42	−19	31	Relegation to Serbian League

Source: First League (in Serbian)
Rules for classification: 1) Points; 2) Points in regular season; 3) Head-to-head points in regular season; 4) Head-to-head goal difference in regular season; 5) Head-to-head goals scored in regular season; 6) Head-to-head away goals scored in regular season (if two teams tied); 7) Goal difference; 8) Goals scored; 9) Fair play ranking; 10) Drawing of lots.
(R) Relegated

== Top scorers ==
As of matches played on 25 May 2025.

Rank	Player	Club	Goals
1	(Serbia) Luka Ratković	Dubočica	18
2	(Serbia) Stefan Stanisavljević	Javor-Matis	13
2	(Serbia) Bogdan Petrović	Voždovac	13
3	(Serbia) Slavoljub Đokić	Borac 1926	12
3	(Senegal) Babacar Mboup	RFK Grafičar	12

== Attendances ==
#	Club	Average
1	Dubočica	939
2	Mačva	828
3	Sloboda	814
4	Smederevo	484
5	Sloven	469
6	Javor	442
7	Zemun	350
8	Radnik	342
9	Borac	303
10	Vršac	272
11	Radnički SM	253
12	Voždovac	250
13	Trayal	213
14	Mladost	196
15	Inđija	178
16	Grafičar	127
