= Marko Mladenović (footballer) =

Serbian footballer

Personal information
- Date of birth: 30 January 2005 (age 21)
- Place of birth: Nürtingen, Germany
- Height: 1.74 m (5 ft 9 in)
- Position: Attacking midfielder

Team information
- Current team: Aluminij

Youth career
- 2011–2022: Stuttgarter Kickers
- 2022–2024: Eintracht Frankfurt

Senior career*
Years	Team	Apps	(Gls)
2024	Eintracht Frankfurt	1	(0)
2024–2026	Vojvodina	29	(2)
2026–	Aluminij	0	(0)

International career^{‡}
2023	Serbia U18	1	(0)
2023–2024	Serbia U19	11	(2)
- * Club domestic league appearances and goals as of 12 June 2026 ‡ National team caps and goals as of 9 September 2024

Marko Mladenović (Serbian Cyrillic: Марко Младеновић; born 30 January 2005) is a professional footballer who plays as an attacking midfielder for Slovenian PrvaLiga club Aluminij. As of 2023, he represents Serbia at youth level.

== Club career ==
=== Eintracht Frankfurt ===
Mladenović started playing football at the age of six with Stuttgarter Kickers, where he progressed through the club’s youth system. In July 2022, he joined Eintracht Frankfurt. He made two appearances for Frankfurt’s second team in the Hessenliga during the fall of 2022, but has primarily played for the club’s Under-19 side. With the U19s, he played in the Under 19 Bundesliga and took part in the UEFA Youth League. In April 2024, Mladenović was called up to the first-team squad for a Bundesliga match against VfB Stuttgart and made his professional debut as a late substitute.

=== Vojvodina ===
In September 2024, Mladenović signed a four-year contract with Vojvodina.

== International career ==
Although eligible to represent Germany, Mladenović opted for Serbia and was called up to the Serbia U18 national team in 2023, playing in a friendly against North Macedonia, after which he became a regular member of the U19 national team.

== Personal life ==
Mladenović holds dual citizenship, with Germany as his birthplace and Serbia as the country of original for his family.

== Honours ==
Individual

- U19 Bundesliga South/Southwest top scorer: 2024 (shared with Max Moerstedt)
