= Lazar Ranđelović =

Serbian footballer (born 1997)

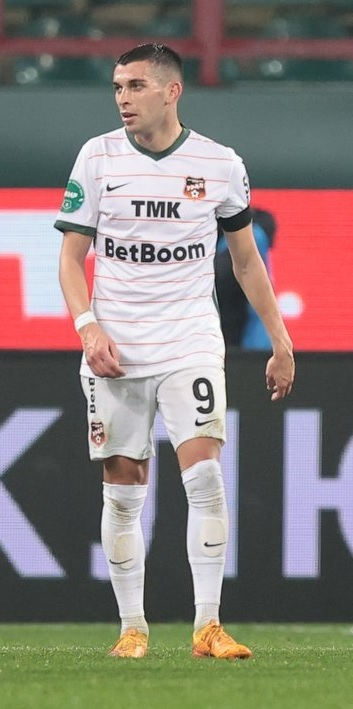
- Ranđelović with Ural Yekaterinburg in 2022

Personal information
- Date of birth: 5 August 1997 (age 29)
- Place of birth: Pertate, FR Yugoslavia
- Height: 1.75 m (5 ft 9 in)
- Position: Winger

Team information
- Current team: Vojvodina
- Number: 77

Youth career
- –2015: Sloga Leskovac

Senior career*
Years	Team	Apps	(Gls)
2015–2016	Jedinstvo Bošnjace	21	(1)
2016	Radan Lebane	15	(4)
2016–2018	Radnički Niš	7	(1)
2017	→ Car Konstantin (loan)	8	(1)
2017–2018	→ Dinamo Vranje (loan)	26	(9)
2018–2024	Olympiacos	41	(3)
2018–2019	→ Radnički Niš (loan)	30	(7)
2021–2022	→ Leganés (loan)	34	(5)
2022–2023	→ Ural Yekaterinburg (loan)	18	(3)
2023–2024	→ Rubin Kazan (loan)	21	(1)
2024–	Vojvodina	56	(10)

International career^{‡}
2018–2019	Serbia U21	7	(2)
2020–	Serbia	3	(0)
- * Club domestic league appearances and goals as of 22 November 2026 ‡ National team caps and goals as of 6 June 2026

Lazar Ranđelović (Serbian Cyrillic: Лазар Ранђеловић; born 5 August 1997) is a Serbian professional footballer who plays as a winger for Serbian SuperLiga club Vojvodina and the Serbia national team.

== Club career ==
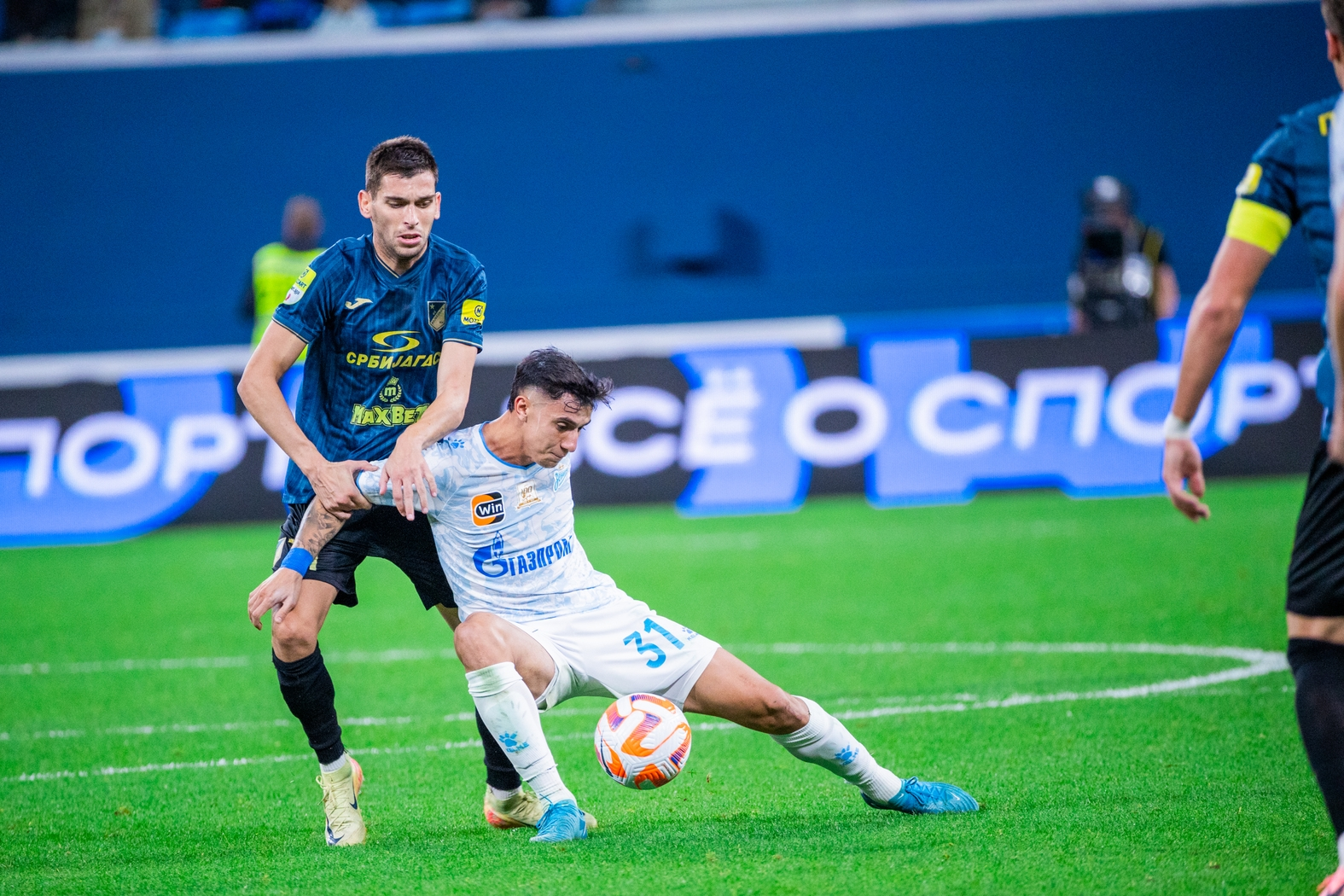
Ranđelović in action for Vojvodina in 2024 against Zenit Saint Petersburg

=== Early career ===
Born in Leskovac, Ranđelović came through the youth categories of the local club Sloga Leskovac. In summer 2015, he moved to the Serbian League East side Jedintvo Bošnjace. Playing with the club he appeared scored a single goal on 21 match in the during the 2015–16 campaign. Next he joined Radan Lebane, where he played for the rest of 2016, making 15 appearances with 4 goals.

=== Radnički Niš ===
After passing trial in early 2017, Ranđelović signed his first four-year professional contract with the Radnički Niš, and shortly after he was loaned to Car Konstantin until the end of the 2016–17 season. Returning from loan, Ranđelović passed the summer pre-season with Radnički after which he was also licensed for the competitive matches. He made his professional debut in the opening fixture of the 2017–18 Serbian SuperLiga campaign, replacing Marko Mrkić in the 73rd minute of the away game against Red Star Belgrade.

He then moved on loan to the Serbian First League club Dinamo Vranje, where he scored 9 goals on 26 matches and contributed to their promotion to the top tier.

=== Olympiacos ===
On 30 August 2018, Ranđelović signed with Greek club Olympiacos for an undisclosed fee. It was a agreed that he would stay with his former club Radnički Niš on loan for the 2018–19 season.

On 21 August 2019, he scored a brace coming on as a substitute in a 4–0 home win game against Krasnodar in the Champions League play-off.

==== Loan to Radnički Niš ====
At the beginning of the 2018–19 Serbian SuperLiga campaign, Ranđelović adapted as an inverted left winger. Following the domestic league matches he made his continental debut in the second leg of the second qualifying round of the Europa League against Maccabi Tel Aviv, when he assisted to Aleksandar Stanisavljević for 2–2 draw.

By the end of the 2018–19 season, he scored a total of seven goals and made eight assists, convincing Olympiacos to bring him back from loan.

==== Loan to Ural Yekaterinburg ====
On 9 September 2022, Ranđelović signed with Russian Premier League club Ural Yekaterinburg. On 14 June 2023, Ural announced that Ranđelović is returning to Olympiacos as his transfer was a loan.

==== Loan to Leganés ====
On the deadline day of the 2021 summer transfer window, Ranđelović moved to Spanish Segunda División side Leganés on a one-year loan deal.

==== Loan to Rubin Kazan ====
On 14 September 2023, Ranđelović returned to the Russian Premier League and signed with Rubin Kazan until the end of the 2023–24 season on loan. On 20 June 2024, Ranđelović left Rubin as his loan period expired.

== International career ==
Ranđelović got his first call in Serbia U21 team by coach Goran Đorović in september 2018.

He scored the first goal in his debut against North Macedonia on 7 September 2018.

Ranđelović made his debut for the senior Serbia national team on 18 November 2020 in a Nations League 5–0 victory over Russia, as a late substitute for Filip Mladenović.

== Career statistics ==
=== Club ===
As of 22 November 2026

Appearances and goals by club, season and competition
Club	Season	League			National Cup		Continental		Total	
Club	Season	Division	Apps	Goals	Apps	Goals	Apps	Goals	Apps	Goals
Jedinstvo Bošnjace	2015–16	Serbian League East	21	1	—		—		21	1
Radan Lebane	2016–17	Serbian League East	15	4	1	0	—		16	4
Car Konstantin	2016–17	Serbian League East	8	1	—		—		8	1
Dinamo Vranje	2017–18	Serbian First League	26	9	0	0	—		26	9
Radnički Niš	2016–17	Serbian SuperLiga	0	0	—		—		0	0
Radnički Niš	2017–18	Serbian SuperLiga	1	0	—		—		1	0
Radnički Niš	2018–19	Serbian SuperLiga	36	7	3	0	1 (Note: Appearances in UEFA Europa League)	0	40	7
Radnički Niš	Total		37	7	3	0	1	0	41	7
Olympiacos	2019–20	Super League Greece	15	2	6	2	10 (Note: Eight appearances and two goals in UEFA Champions League, two appearances in UEFA Europa League)	2	31	6
Olympiacos	2020–21	Super League Greece	23	0	4	0	8 (Note: Six appearances in UEFA Champions League, two appearances in UEFA Europa League)	0	35	0
Olympiacos	2021–22	Super League Greece	0	0	0	0	2 (Note: Appearances in UEFA Champions League)	0	2	0
Olympiacos	2022–23	Super League Greece	3	1	0	0	4	0	7	1
Olympiacos	Total		41	3	10	2	24	2	75	7
Leganés (loan)	2021–22	Segunda División	34	5	3	0	0	0	37	5
Ural (loan)	2022–23	Russian Premier League	18	3	10	0	–		28	3
Rubin Kazan (loan)	2023–24	Russian Premier League	21	1	2	0	–		23	1
Vojvodina	2024–25	Serbian SuperLiga	7	0	1	0	–		8	0
Vojvodina	2025–26	Serbian SuperLiga	33	7	4	0	–		37	7
Vojvodina	2026–27	Serbian SuperLiga	16	3	1	0	4	0	21	3
Vojvodina	Total		56	10	6	0	4	0	66	10
Career total			277	44	35	2	29	2	341	48

=== International ===
As of match played 5 June 2026

National team	Year	Apps	Goals
Serbia	2020	1	0
Serbia	2026	2	0
Total		3	0

== Honours ==
Olympiacos

- Super League Greece: 2019–20, 2020–21
- Greek Cup: 2019–20; runner-up: 2020–21

Individual

- Greek Cup Final Most Valuable Player: 2019–20
- Serbian SuperLiga Player of the Week: 2025–26 (Round 13), 2026–27 (Round 1)
