= Kufre Eta =

Cameroonian footballer

Personal information
- Date of birth: 10 June 2004 (age 22)
- Place of birth: Limbe, Cameroon
- Height: 1.87 m (6 ft 2 in)
- Position: Defensive midfielder

Team information
- Current team: Vojvodina
- Number: 2

Senior career*
Years	Team	Apps	(Gls)
2022	Best Stars		
2022–2025	Belasitsa Petrich	63	(4)
2025	CSKA 1948	7	(1)
2025	→ CSKA 1948 II	3	(0)
2025–	Vojvodina	10	(0)
- * Club domestic league appearances and goals as of 12 June 2026

Kufre Eta (born 10 June 2004) is a Cameroonian professional footballer who plays as a defensive midfielder for Serbian SuperLiga club Vojvodina.

== Club career ==
=== Vojvodina ===
Eta joined Vojvodina in July 2025, signing a contract until the summer of 2029. Reported transfer fee was €1 million, plus 10% of the future transfer.

== Career statistics ==
As of 4 April 2026

Appearances and goals by club, season and competition
Club	Season	League			Cup		Continental		Total	
Club	Season	Division	Apps	Goals	Apps	Goals	Apps	Goals	Apps	Goals
Belasitsa	2022–23	Second League Bulgaria	22	1	0	0	—		22	1
Belasitsa	2023–24	Second League Bulgaria	29	3	0	0	—		29	3
Belasitsa	2024–25	Second League Bulgaria	12	0	0	0	—		12	0
Belasitsa	Total		63	4	0	0	—		63	4
CSKA 1948	2024–25	First League Bulgaria	6	1	0	0	—		6	1
CSKA 1948	2025–26	First League Bulgaria	1	0	0	0	—		1	0
CSKA 1948	Total		7	1	0	0	—		7	1
CSKA 1948 II	2024–25	Second League Bulgaria	3	0	0	0	—		3	0
Vojvodina	2025–26	Serbian SuperLiga	10	0	1	0	—		11	0
Career total			83	5	1	0	0	0	84	5
