= Miloš Popović (footballer, born 2004) =

Serbian footballer

Personal information
- Date of birth: 5 April 2004 (age 22)
- Place of birth: Novi Sad, Serbia and Montenegro
- Height: 1.77 m (5 ft 10 in)
- Position: Midfielder

Team information
- Current team: Radnik Surdulica
- Number: 5

Youth career
- –2022: Vojvodina

Senior career*
Years	Team	Apps	(Gls)
2022–2025	Vojvodina	4	(0)
2022–2023	→ Kabel (loan)	22	(2)
2023–2024	→ Mladost GAT (loan)	28	(0)
2024–2025	→ Kabel (loan)	20	(3)
2025–	Radnik Surdulica	29	(2)
- * Club domestic league appearances and goals as of 12 June 2026

Miloš Popović (Serbian Cyrillic: Милош Поповић; born 5 April 2004) is a Serbian professional footballer who plays as a Midfielder for Serbian SuperLiga club Radnik Surdulica.

== Club career ==
=== Vojvodina ===
In March 2021, Popović signed his first professional contract with Vojvodina. On 1 September 2024, Popović made his first-team debut, replacing Andrija Radulović in 84th minute of 0:0 away draw at Partizan. Just 3 days after his senior debut for the club, Popović signed a deal that would keep him in Vojvodina until 2027.

== Career statistics ==
As of 31 May 2025

Club	Season	League			Cup		Continental		Total	
Club	Season	Division	Apps	Goals	Apps	Goals	Apps	Goals	Apps	Goals
Vojvodina	2024–25	Serbian SuperLiga	4	0	0	0	0	0	4	0
Vojvodina	2025–26	Serbian SuperLiga	0	0	0	0	—		0	0
Vojvodina	Total		4	0	0	0	0	0	4	0
Kabel (loan)	2022–23	Serbian League Vojvodina	22	2	2	0	—		24	2
Mladost GAT (loan)	2023–24	Serbian First League	28	0	1	0	—		29	0
Kabel (loan)	2024–25	Serbian League Vojvodina	20	3	0	0	—		20	3
Career total			74	5	3	0	0	0	77	5
