= Miroslav Tanjga =

Serbian footballer (born 1964)

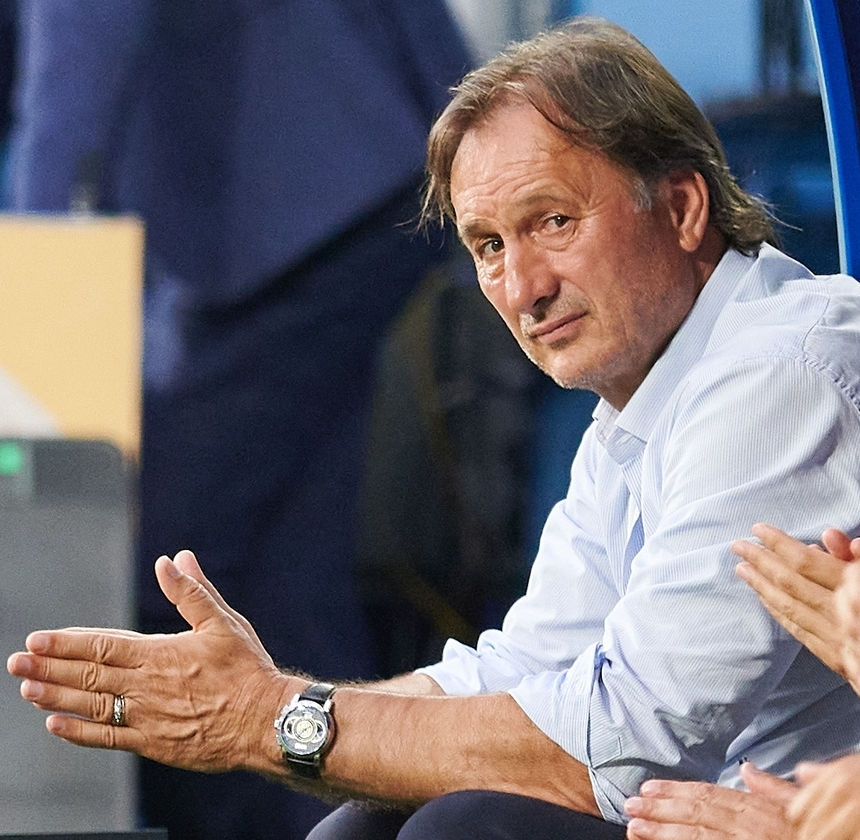
- Tanjga in 2025

Personal information
- Full name: Miroslav Tanjga
- Date of birth: 22 July 1964 (age 62)
- Place of birth: Vinkovci, SR Croatia, SFR Yugoslavia
- Height: 1.91 m (6 ft 3 in)
- Position: Defender

Senior career*
Years	Team	Apps	(Gls)
1984–1988	Dinamo Vinkovci	13	(0)
1988–1991	Vojvodina	79	(9)
1991–1992	Red Star Belgrade	18	(0)
1992	Fenerbahçe	7	(0)
1992–1996	Hertha BSC	94	(4)
1996–1999	Mainz 05	82	(3)
Total		293	(16)

Managerial career
- 2012–2013: Serbia (assistant)
- 2013–2015: Sampdoria (assistant)
- 2015–2016: Milan (assistant)
- 2016–2018: Torino (assistant)
- 2019–2022: Bologna (assistant)
- 2019: Bologna (interim)
- 2025–2026: Vojvodina
- * Club domestic league appearances and goals

Miroslav Tanjga (Serbian Cyrillic: Мирослав Тањга; born 22 July 1964) is a Serbian former footballer who played as a defender.

== Playing career ==
Tanjga was in born in Vinkovci, SR Croatia, and grew up in the village of Stari Jankovci. After playing in the Yugoslav First League with several clubs, Dinamo Vinkovci, Vojvodina and Red Star Belgrade, he moved to first to Turkey, to Fenerbahçe, then to Germany in 1992, and played there the rest of his career, having represented Hertha BSC and Mainz 05.

== Coaching career ==
A longtime friend of Siniša Mihajlović from his playing days at Vojvodina, Tanjga returned to work alongside him in 2012 as his assistant for the Serbia national football team.

He re-joined forces with Mihajlović at Torino in 2016, and then followed him also at Bologna in 2019.

Tanjga took over the sidelines from Mihajlović on 11 April as a result of Mihajlović getting treatment for Leukemia. Bologna beat Sampdoria 2-0 in Tanjga's first match as temporary manager.

3 March 2025, he became the manager of Vojvodina.

== Personal life ==
His son Siniša is a professional footballer that playing for father's former club Vojvodina.

== Managerial statistics ==
As of 25 July 2026

Managerial record by team and tenure
Team	From	To	Record				
Team	From	To	G	W	D	L	Win %
Vojvodina	3 March 2025	25 July 2026	58	34	9	15	58.62
Career total			58	34	9	15	58.62
