= Stefan Stanisavljević =

Serbian footballer (born 2002)

Stefan Stanisavljević Стефан Станисављевић
Personal information
- Date of birth: 16 January 2002 (age 24)
- Place of birth: Jagodina, FR Yugoslavia
- Height: 1.94 m (6 ft 4 in)
- Position: Centre-forward

Team information
- Current team: Vojvodina
- Number: 19

Youth career
- Šampion Ribare
- ŠF Vuk Paraćin
- Spartak Subotica

Senior career*
Years	Team	Apps	(Gls)
2020	Spartak Subotica	0	(0)
2021	Jedinstvo Paraćin		
2022	Bačka Bačka Palanka	13	(1)
2022	GFK Jagodina		(11)
2023–2024	Mladost Lučani	11	(1)
2023	→ Kolubara (loan)	19	(4)
2024	→ Radnički Sremska Mitrovica (loan)	17	(4)
2024–2025	Javor Ivanjica	37	(13)
2025–	Vojvodina	7	(1)
2025–2026	→ Novi Pazar (loan)	19	(8)
- * Club domestic league appearances and goals as of 22 November 2026

Stefan Stanisavljević (Serbian Cyrillic: Стефан Станисављевић; born 16 January 2002) is a Serbian professional footballer who plays as a centre-forward for Serbian SuperLiga club Vojvodina.

== Club career ==
Stanisavljević began his career with Šampion Ribare near Jagodina, before moving to ŠF Vuk Paraćin. He later joined the youth system of Spartak Subotica.

He was included in Spartak's first-team squad for a Serbian SuperLiga match during the 2019–20 season, but did not make an appearance. He left the club during the winter break of the 2020–21 season and joined Jedinstvo Paraćin.

Stanisavljević later signed his first professional contract with OFK Bačka. He made his senior debut in February 2022 against Rad and scored his first goal in the following match against Javor Ivanjica.

Following Bačka's relegation, he moved to Jagodina, where he scored 11 goals in the first half of the 2022–23 season.

In early 2023, he signed a three-year contract with Mladost Lučani. He made his Serbian SuperLiga debut with the club and scored his first top-flight goal in a match against Kolubara.

During the 2023–24 season, he spent time on loan at Kolubara and Radnički Sremska Mitrovica, scoring four goals for each club in the Serbian First League.

In July 2024, he joined Javor Ivanjica. He scored 13 goals during the 2024–25 Serbian First League season, finishing among the league's top scorers.

In July 2025, Stanisavljević signed for Vojvodina. He made his debut later that month against Spartak Subotica.

In September 2025, he joined Novi Pazar on loan for the remainder of the season. He scored on his debut for the club against his parent team Vojvodina. He later scored in consecutive home matches against Radnički Kragujevac and Mladost Lučani.

By March 2026, he had established himself as the club's first-choice striker, recording eight goals and three assists in all competitions. He subsequently missed the remainder of the season due to a back injury.
