= Damjan Đokanović =

Serbian footballer (born 2008)

Damjan Đokanović Дамјан Ђокановић
Personal information
- Date of birth: 31 January 2008 (age 18)
- Place of birth: Novi Sad, Serbia
- Height: 1.89 m (6 ft 2 in)
- Position: Centre-forward

Team information
- Current team: Bor
- Number: 55

Youth career
- Vojvodina

Senior career*
Years	Team	Apps	(Gls)
2025–	Vojvodina	12	(0)
2026–	→ Bor (loan)	17	(1)

International career^{‡}
2022	Serbia U15	5	(0)
2023–2024	Serbia U16	7	(1)
2024–2025	Serbia U17	8	(2)
2025–	Serbia U18	2	(0)
- * Club domestic league appearances and goals as of 22 November 2026 ‡ National team caps and goals as of 18 February 2026

Damjan Đokanović (Serbian Cyrillic: Дамјан Ђокановић; born 31 January 2008) is a Serbian professional footballer who plays as a centre-forward for Serbian First League club Bor on loan from Vojvodina.

== Club career ==
Đokanović came through the youth academy of Vojvodina. He was included in the club's first-team winter preparations in January 2025.

He made his Serbian SuperLiga debut on 13 September 2025, appearing as a substitute against Čukarički during the 2025–26 Serbian SuperLiga season. In October 2025, he extended his contract with Vojvodina until 2028.

Đokanović scored his first senior goal in a Serbian Cup round of 16 match against OFK Vršac in December 2025.

== International career ==
He made his debut for the Serbia U15 in October 2022, featuring in two matches against North Macedonia. He subsequently took part in the UEFA Development Tournament in November 2022.

In November 2023, Đokanović was called up to the Serbia U16 squad. He scored his first goal at that level in a friendly match against Montenegro in March 2024.

He was later selected for the Serbia U17 team in September 2024 for a double-header against Slovakia. In March 2025, he scored twice in a friendly against Slovenia. Later that month, he featured in the second qualifying round for the UEFA European Under-17 Championship, where Serbia failed to reach the final tournament.

In November 2025, Đokanović represented the Serbia U18 team in matches against Russia.

== Career statistics ==
As of 22 November 2026

Appearances and goals by club, season and competition
Club	Season	League			National cup		Continental		Other		Total	
Club	Season	Division	Apps	Goals	Apps	Goals	Apps	Goals	Apps	Goals	Apps	Goals
Vojvodina	2024–25	Serbian SuperLiga	0	0	0	0	—		—		0	0
Vojvodina	2025–26	Serbian SuperLiga	12	0	1	1	—		—		13	1
Vojvodina	Total		12	0	1	1	—		—		13	1
Bor (loan)	2026–27	Serbian First League	17	1	—		—		—		17	1
Career total			29	1	1	1	—		—		30	2
