= 2026–27 Serbian SuperLiga =

Serbian SuperLiga
- Season: 2026–27
- Dates: 17 July 2026 –
- Teams: 14
- Promoted: Zemun; Mačva
- Matches: 104
- Goals: 269 (2.59 per match)
- Average goals/game: 2.59
- Top goalscorer: Dejan Zukić (8 goals)
- Biggest home win: Red Star Belgrade 5–0 Mačva; Radnički 1923 5–0 Mladost
- Biggest away win: Čukarički 0–5 Vojvodina
- Highest scoring: OFK Beograd 3–5 Radnički 1923; Radnik 4–4 Partizan
- Longest winning run: Red Star Belgrade (7 matches)
- Longest unbeaten run: Red Star Belgrade (15 matches)
- Longest winless run: Zemun (12 matches)
- Longest losing run: Zemun (7 matches)
- All statistics correct as of 18 November 2026.

The 2026–27 Serbian SuperLiga is the 21st season of the Serbian SuperLiga, the top flight of football in Serbia. The season began on 17 July 2026. The defending champions are Red Star Belgrade. The league features two promoted clubs, Zemun and Mačva.

== Overview ==
The Serbian SuperLiga will be reduced from 14 to 12 teams from 2027–28 onwards. Four teams will therefore be relegated to the Serbian First League at the end of this season.

== Teams ==
Locations of the 2026–27 Serbian SuperLiga teams
1 Red Star Belgrade
2 Čukarički
3 IMT
4 Mačva
5 Mladost
6 Novi Pazar
7 OFK Beograd
8 Partizan
9 Radnički 1923
10 Radnički Niš
11 Radnik
12 Zemun
13 Vojvodina
14 Železničar

Fourteen teams compete in the league: the top 12 from the previous season and two promoted from the 2025–26 Serbian First League. Zemun returned to the top flight after seven seasons and Mačva after five seasons.

=== Team changes ===
Promoted from 2025–26 Serbian First League	Relegated from 2025–26 Serbian SuperLiga
▲ Zemun ▲ Mačva	▼ Napredak ▼ Spartak ŽK ▼ Javor-Matis ▼TSC

=== Stadiums and locations ===
Club	City	Stadium	Capacity
Red Star Belgrade	Belgrade	Rajko Mitić Stadium	49,167
Čukarički	Belgrade	Čukarički Stadium	4,070
IMT	Belgrade	Lagator Stadium	8,030
Mačva	Šabac	FK Mačva Stadium	5,500
Mladost	Lučani	SRC Mr Radoš Milovanović	6,000
Novi Pazar	Novi Pazar	Novi Pazar City Stadium	10,000
OFK Beograd	Belgrade	SC FSS (temporarily)	3,000
Partizan	Belgrade	Partizan Stadium	29,775
Radnički 1923	Kragujevac	Čika Dača Stadium	15,100
Radnički Niš	Niš	Čair Stadium	18,151
Radnik	Surdulica	Surdulica City Stadium	3,312
Vojvodina	Novi Sad	Karađorđe Stadium	14,458
Zemun	Belgrade	Stadium Dragan Džajić	4,000
Železničar	Pančevo	SC Mladost Stadium	2,967

=== Number of teams by cities ===
No. of teams	City	Team(s)
6	Belgrade	Red Star Belgrade, Čukarički, IMT, OFK Beograd, Partizan, Zemun
1	Šabac	Mačva
1	Lučani	Mladost
1	Novi Pazar	Novi Pazar
1	Kragujevac	Radnički 1923
1	Niš	Radnički Niš
1	Surdulica	Radnik
1	Novi Sad	Vojvodina
1	Pančevo	Železničar

=== Personnel and kits ===
Note: Flags indicate national teams according to FIFA eligibility rules.

Team	Manager	Captain	Kit maker	Shirt sponsor(s)
Red Star Belgrade	(Spain) Albert Riera	(Montenegro) Mirko Ivanić	Macron	Gazprom
Čukarički	(Serbia) Mihajlo Trajković	(Serbia) Marko Docić	Adidas	
IMT	(Serbia) Zoran Popović	(Serbia) Vasilije Novičić	SevenSports	MrBit
Mačva	(Serbia) Nemanja Glušica	(Serbia) Slobodan Sladojević	NAAI	Grad Šabac, MPPD BRAĆA RUŽIĆ DOO KLENJE
Mladost	(Serbia) Radovan Ćurčić	(Serbia) Nikola Ćirković	Kelme	MB Lučani
Novi Pazar	(Serbia) Nenad Lalatović	(Serbia) Jovan Marinković	Macron	Doha Group
OFK Beograd	(Montenegro) Radoslav Batak	(Serbia) Saša Marković	Macron	Mozzart Bet
Partizan	(Serbia) Aleksandar Stanojević	(Serbia) Nikola Simić	Kappa	MaxBet
Radnički 1923	(Bosnia and Herzegovina) Feđa Dudić	(Serbia) Slobodan Simović	SevenSports	AdmiralBet, Sportske.net
Radnički Niš	(Montenegro) Nikola Drinčić	(Serbia) Radomir Milosavljević	Masita	mt:s, MaxBet
Radnik	(Serbia) Zoran Rendulić	(Serbia) Miloš Popović	Jako	New City Hotel & Restaurant
Vojvodina	(Serbia) Marko Savić	(Serbia) Dejan Zukić	Capelli Sport	AdmiralBet, Srbijagas
Zemun	(North Macedonia) Gjorgji Mojsov	(Serbia) Mladen Živković	SevenSports	PMC Inženjering
Železničar	(Serbia) Radomir Koković	(Serbia) Zoran Popović	Capelli Sport	

Notes

- Nike is the official ball supplier for the Serbian SuperLiga.
- Capelli Sport is the official sponsor of the Referee's Committee of the Football Association of Serbia.

== Regular season ==
=== League table ===
Pos	Team	Pld	W	D	L	GF	GA	GD	Pts	Qualification
1	Red Star Belgrade	16	15	1	0	40	6	+34	46	Qualification for the Championship round
2	Vojvodina	15	10	2	3	30	13	+17	32	Qualification for the Championship round
3	Železničar	15	10	2	3	28	12	+16	32	Qualification for the Championship round
4	IMT	15	6	5	4	16	10	+6	23	Qualification for the Championship round
5	Radnički 1923	15	7	2	6	22	19	+3	23	Qualification for the Championship round
6	Radnik	16	6	5	5	20	20	0	23	Qualification for the Championship round
7	Novi Pazar	16	6	4	6	17	16	+1	22	Qualification for the Relegation round
8	Čukarički	15	6	4	5	21	21	0	22	Qualification for the Relegation round
9	Mladost	16	4	6	6	12	25	−13	18	Qualification for the Relegation round
10	Partizan	15	5	2	8	25	26	−1	17	Qualification for the Relegation round
11	Mačva	15	3	4	8	13	26	−13	13	Qualification for the Relegation round
12	OFK Beograd	16	2	5	9	15	29	−14	11	Qualification for the Relegation round
13	Radnički Niš	15	3	2	10	11	25	−14	11	Qualification for the Relegation round
14	Zemun	16	1	4	11	8	30	−22	7	Qualification for the Relegation round

Updated to match(es) played on 21 November 2026. Source:
Rules for classification: 1) Points; 2) Head-to-head points; 3) Head-to-head goal difference; 4) Goal difference; 5) Goals scored.

=== Results ===
Home \ Away	CUK	IMT	MAC	MLA	NPZ	OFK	PAR	RAD	RDK	RNI	RSB	VOJ	ZEL	ZEM
Čukarički		0–1	2–2		1–1	2–0			3–0	2–1		0–5		3–0
IMT	0–0			2–0				1–0		0–0	0–1		0–1	4–0
Mačva		1–0		1–2		1–1	1–3		0–0	1–0	2–4			
Mladost	2–2				0–0	0–0	3–1	0–1		1–0		1–1	0–4	
Novi Pazar		1–2	1–1	2–0		1–4			1–0			2–0	2–0	2–2
OFK Beograd		1–1			0–2			0–0	3–5		0–1	0–2	2–2	1–0
Partizan	0–2	1–2	1–2		1–0	3–1			0–1			2–3		3–0
Radnik	3–1		2–1	1–1	1–0	2–1	4–4			3–0	0–0			
Radnički 1923		2–1		5–0	2–0			1–0			0–3		1–2	3–0
Radnički Niš	0–2				0–2	3–1	2–3		1–1			1–4		1–0
Red Star Belgrade	4–0		5–0	5–1	2–0		2–1	2–0		3–0		3–1		
Vojvodina		1–1	2–0			4–0		2–1	2–0		0–1		1–0	2–1
Železničar	2–1		2–0	0–0			1–0	5–1	3–1	2–1	1–2			
Zemun		1–1	1–0	0–1			2–2	1–1		0–1	0–2		0–3	

Updated to match(es) played on 21 November 2026. Source: SuperLiga (in Serbian)
Legend: Blue = home team win; Yellow = draw; Red = away team win.
For upcoming matches, an "a" indicates there is an article about the rivalry between the two participants.

== Top scorers ==
As of matches played on 8 November 2026 (round 15).

Rank	Player	Club	Goals
1	(Serbia) Dejan Zukić	Vojvodina	8
2	(Ivory Coast) Yacoube Silué	OFK Beograd	7
3	(Serbia) Vukašin Bogdanović	Radnik	6
3	(Serbia) Uroš Miladinović	Čukarički	6
3	(Serbia) Uroš Sremčević	Radnički 1923	6

== Player of the week ==
As of players announced through round 15.

Round	Player	Club	Goals	Assists	Saves	Ref.
1	(Serbia) Lazar Ranđelović	Vojvodina	1	2	0	
2	(Serbia) Vasilije Novičić	IMT	1	0	0	
3	(Serbia) Uroš Miladinović	Čukarički	2	1	0	
4	(France) Mohamed Cissé	Radnički 1923	2	0	0	
5	(Serbia) Bogdan Matijašević	Novi Pazar	0	0	7	
6	(Bulgaria) Kristiyan Balov	Red Star Belgrade	1	1	0	
7	(Ghana) Kwaku Karikari	Železničar	3	1	0	
8	(Montenegro) Mirko Ivanić	Red Star Belgrade	1	1	0	
9	(Serbia) Milan Kolarević	Vojvodina	2	0	0	
10	(Serbia) Vukašin Bogdanović	Radnik Surdulica	2	0	0	
11	(Serbia) Stefan Gudelj	Red Star Belgrade	1	1	0	
12	(Serbia) Mirko Milikić	Železničar	0	0	0	
13	(Serbia) Milan Đoković	Radnički 1923	2	0	0	
14	(Senegal) Bamba Dieng	Red Star Belgrade	3	0	0	
15	(Serbia) Miloš Pantović	Železničar	2	0	0	

== See also ==
- 2026–27 Serbian First League
- 2026–27 Serbian Cup
