= 2024–25 FK Vojvodina season =

FK Vojvodina
2024–25 season
- Chairman: Dragoljub Zbiljić
- Manager: Božidar Bandović (until 27 August 2024); Nemanja Krtolica (from 28 August 2024) (until 7 October 2024); Nenad Lalatović (from 8 October 2024) (until 2 March 2025); Miroslav Tanjga (from 3 March 2025)
- Stadium: Karađorđe Stadium
- Serbian SuperLiga: 6th
- Serbian Cup: Runners-up
- UEFA Europa League: Second qualifying round
- UEFA Europa Conference League: Third qualifying round
- Top goalscorer: League: Dele (15); All: Dele (18)
- Highest home attendance: League: 6,500 vs Red Star Belgrade (29 March 2025); Europe: 4,412 vs Ajax (1 August 2024)
- Lowest home attendance: League: 800 vs Tekstilac (23 November 2024); Europe: 1,900 vs Maribor (15 August 2024)
- Average home league attendance: 2,146
colours	colours
- All statistics correct as of May 25, 2025.

The 2024–25 season was the 111th season in the history of FK Vojvodina, and the club's 21st consecutive season in Serbian SuperLiga. In addition to the domestic league, the team participated in the Serbian Cup and the UEFA Europa League.

== Transfers ==
=== In ===
Pos.	Player	Transferred from	Fee	Date	Source
MF	(Serbia) Njegoš Petrović	(Spain) Granada	€800,000	29 May 2024	
MF	(Serbia) Aleksandar Busnić	(Portugal) Vizela	End of Loan	30 May 2024	
GK	(Serbia) Matija Gočmanac	(Serbia) Mačva Šabac	End of Loan	1 June 2024	
DF	(Romania) Mihai Butean	(Romania) Hermannstadt	Free	1 June 2024	
FW	(Serbia) Marko Veličković	(Serbia) Mladost Lučani	€400,000	3 June 2024	
FW	(Serbia) Stefan Vukić	(Serbia) Radnički Niš	End of Loan	10 June 2024	
MF	(Serbia) Marko Poletanović	(Poland) Zagłębie Lubin	Free	13 June 2024	
DF	(Brazil) Lucas Barros	(Portugal) Gil Vincente	€150,000	30 June 2024	
DF	(Kenya) Collins Sichenje	(Sweden) AIK	€400,000	10 July 2024	
FW	(Nigeria) Bamidele Yusuf	(Serbia) Radnički Niš	€300,000	12 July 2024	
MF	(Serbia) Lazar Nikolić	(Serbia) Red Star	Free	18 July 2024	
MF	(Serbia) Slobodan Medojević	(Cyprus) AEL Limassol	Free	27 July 2024	
FW	(Serbia) Marko Mladenović	(Germany) Eintracht Frankfurt	Free	9 September 2024	
FW	(Angola) Depú	(Portugal) Gil Vicente	Loan	11 September 2024	
MF	(Serbia) Lazar Ranđelović	(Greece) Olympiacos	Undisclosed	13 September 2024	
MF	(Serbia) Dragan Kokanović	(Serbia) Mladost GAT	End of Loan	13 September 2024	
Winter transfers
FW	(Serbia) Lazar Romanić	(Serbia) Železničar	€550,000	11 January 2025	
▼ Spending: €2,600,000

=== Out ===
Pos.	Player	Transferred to	Fee	Date	Source
MF	(Brazil) Matheus Índio	(Portugal) Vitória Guimarães	End of Loan	29 May 2024	
MF	(Montenegro) Asmir Kajević	(Montenegro) Dečić	Free	11 June 2024	
FW	(Montenegro) Ivan Vukčević	(Montenegro) Sutjeska Nikšić	Loan	17 June 2024	
MF	(Serbia) Lazar Jovanović	(Serbia) Red Star Belgrade	€30,000	25 June 2024	
MF	(Serbia) Aleksandar Busnić	(Portugal) Vizela	Undisclosed	27 June 2024	
FW	(Serbia) Filip Malbašić	Free Agent		30 June 2024	
DF	(Serbia) Marko Bjeković	Free Agent		5 July 2024	
GK	(Serbia) Nemanja Toroman	(Serbia) Inđija	Loan	6 July 2024	
MF	(Serbia) Dejan Zukić	(Austria) Wolfsberger AC	€900,000	9 July 2024	
FW	(Jamaica) Norman Campbell	(Denmark) Randers	€300,000	11 July 2024	
FW	(Serbia) Stefan Vukić	(China) Chongqing Tonglianglong	Free	15 July 2024	
DF	(Serbia) Milan Lazarević	(Serbia) Partizan	€80,000	15 July 2024	
MF	(Serbia) Milan Kovačev	(Cyprus) Aris	Undisclosed	19 July 2024	
DF	(Serbia) Filip Antonijević	(Bosnia and Herzegovina) Radnik Bijeljina	Free	20 July 2024	
GK	(Montenegro) Lazar Carević	(Portugal) Famalicão	€800,000	22 August 2024	
DF	(Serbia) Igor Jeličić	(Norway) Kristiansund	Undisclosed	22 August 2024	
FW	(Serbia) Mihailo Ivanović	(England) Millwall	€3,000,000	31 August 2024	
DF	(Georgia (country)) Guram Giorbelidze	(Turkey) Erzurumspor	Free	2 September 2024	
Winter transfers
MF	(Montenegro) Andrija Radulović	(Austria) Rapid Wien	Loan	6 February 2025	
MF	(Serbia) Mihajlo Butraković	(Serbia) Radnički SM	Loan	7 February 2025	
MF	(Serbia) Marko Poletanović	(Poland) Wisła Kraków	Free	10 February 2025	
MF	(Ivory Coast) Caleb Zady Sery	(Norway) Molde	€1,800,000	24 March 2025	
▲ Income: €6,910,000

== Friendlies ==
=== Pre-season ===
22 June 2024 Friendly	Vojvodina	3–0	(Serbia) Spartak Subotica	Novi Sad
18:00	Radulović 28'; Vukanović 52'; Zady 57'	Report		Stadium: SC Vujadin Boškov; Attendance: 100; Referee: Dušan Pjevac

29 June 2024 Friendly	Vojvodina	2–0	(Montenegro) Dečić	Zlatibor
11:00	Vukanović 40', 55'	Report		Stadium: Hotel Galens Football field Attendance: 50

29 June 2024 Friendly	Vojvodina	3–2	(Armenia) Noah	Zlatibor
18:00	Nikolić 49'; Zukić 71' (pen.); Zady 85' (pen.)	Report	Rogerson 11', 18'	Stadium: Hotel Galens Football field Attendance: 80

6 July 2024 Friendly	Vojvodina	3–2	(Serbia) Mladost Lučani	Užice
17:00	Veličković 56'; Sukačev 108'; Nikolić 132'	Report	Silue 5'; N'Diaye 137' (pen.)	Stadium: Radomir Antić Stadium; Attendance: 150
Note: Played 2x70 minutes

14 July 2024 Friendly	Vojvodina	1–1	(Turkey) Başakşehir	Stara Pazova
19:00	Veličković	Report	Figueiredo	Stadium: Serbian FA Sports Center; Attendance: 0

18 September 2024 Friendly	Vojvodina	4–1	(Serbia) Sloga Čonoplja	Novi Sad
16:00	Đorđević; Đokanović; Mladenović	Report		Stadium: SC Vujadin Boškov; Attendance: 150

12 October 2024 Friendly	Zenit St. Petersburg (Russia)	4–1	Vojvodina	Saint Petersburg, Russia
18:00	Sobolev 10' 39'; Mantuan 45+1'; Gondou 48'	Report	Crnomarković 25'	Stadium: Gazprom Arena; Attendance: 17,822; Referee: Artem Lyubimov (Russia)

=== Winter training camp ===
13 January 2025 Friendly	Vojvodina	1–0	(Uzbekistan) Surkhon	Antalya, Turkey
15:00	Dele 14'	Report		Stadium: Titanic Deluxe Belek Football Center; Attendance: 20

16 January 2025 Friendly	Vojvodina	4–0	(Kazakhstan) Kyzylzhar	Antalya, Turkey
15:00	Kokanović 7', 19'; Sery 24'; Depú 67'	Report		Stadium: Titanic Deluxe Belek Football Center; Attendance: 50

19 January 2025 Friendly	Vojvodina	1–2	(Bulgaria) Slavia Sofia	Antalya, Turkey
15:00	Đorđević 16'	Report	Minchev 24' (pen.); Fabien 34'	Stadium: Titanic Deluxe Belek Football Center; Attendance: 30

21 January 2025 Friendly	Vojvodina	0–1	(Russia) Akhmat Grozny	Antalya, Turkey
14:30		Report	Ghandri 84' (pen.)	Stadium: Titanic Deluxe Belek Football Center; Attendance: 50

22 January 2025 Friendly	Vojvodina	v	(Russia) Rubin Kazan	Antalya, Turkey
Note: Cancelled due to bad weather

27 January 2025 Friendly	Vojvodina	2–1	(Serbia) Spartak Subotica	Novi Sad
13:30	Popović 57'; Romanić 70'			Stadium: SC Vujadin Boškov; Attendance: 40

== Competitions ==
=== Overall record ===
Competition	First match	Last match	Starting round	Final position	Record							
Competition	First match	Last match	Starting round	Final position	Pld	W	D	L	GF	GA	GD	Win %
Serbian SuperLiga	21 July 2024	25 May 2025	Matchday 1	6th	37	14	11	12	57	49	+8	37.84
Serbian Cup	30 October 2024	21 May 2025	Round of 32	Runners-up	5	4	0	1	7	4	+3	80.00
UEFA Europa League	25 July 2024	1 August 2024	Second qualifying round	Second qualifying round	2	0	0	2	1	4	−3	0.00
UEFA Europa Conference League	8 August 2024	15 August 2024	Third qualifying round	Third qualifying round	2	1	0	1	2	2	+0	50.00
Total					46	19	11	16	67	59	+8	41.30

Last updated: 25 May 2025
Source: Soccerway

=== Serbian SuperLiga ===
==== League table ====
Pos	Team	Pld	W	D	L	GF	GA	GD	Pts	Qualification
3	OFK Beograd	30	13	7	10	40	39	+1	46	Qualification for the Championship round
4	Radnički 1923	30	13	6	11	47	40	+7	45	Qualification for the Championship round
5	Vojvodina	30	11	9	10	48	40	+8	42	Qualification for the Championship round
6	Mladost Lučani	30	11	9	10	32	35	−3	42	Qualification for the Championship round
7	TSC	30	12	5	13	47	44	+3	41	Qualification for the Championship round

Source: SuperLiga (in Serbian)
Rules for classification: 1) Points; 2) Head-to-head points; 3) Head-to-head goal difference; 4) Head-to-head goals scored; 5) Head-to-head away goals scored (if two teams tied); 6) Goal difference; 7) Goals scored; 8) Fair play ranking; 9) Draw.

==== Results by matchday ====
Round	1	2	3	4	5	6	7	8	9	10	11	12	13	14	15	16	17	18	19	20	21	22	23	24	25	26	27	28	29	30
Ground	A	H	A	H	A	H	A	H	A	H	A	A	H	A	H	H	A	H	A	H	A	H	A	H	A	H	H	A	H	A
Result	W	L	L	L	D	L	D	W	W	D	W	D	W	L	D	D	W	L	W	W	D	D	D	L	W	L	W	L	L	W
Position	2	8	10	12	13	15	14	11	9	11	8	7	6	10	9	8	7	9	6	6	6	6	5	6	5	6	6	6	6	5

Updated to match(es) played on 7 April 2025. Source: https://www.superliga.rs/sezone/2021-22/team/5-super-liga-srbije-2021-22/15-vojvodina
A = Away; H = Home; W = Win; D = Draw; L = Loss

=== Results ===
21 July 2024 1	Tekstilac	1–3	Vojvodina	Bačka Palanka
19:30	Davidović 90'	Report	Vukanović 29'; Veličković 51'; Radulović 88'	Stadium: Slavko Maletin Vava Stadium; Attendance: 2,000; Referee: (Serbia) Lazar Lukić

2 October 2024 2	Vojvodina	0–1	Novi Pazar	Novi Sad
19:00		Report	Antwi 1'	Stadium: Karađorđe Stadium; Attendance: 1,200; Referee: (Serbia) Momčilo Marković
Note: Game was originally scheduled on 27 July, but was postponed to 2 October due to matches in UEFA Europe League

4 August 2024 3	Čukarički	3–1	Vojvodina	Belgrade
20:00	Kovač 19' 39'; Mello 30'	Report	Radulović 37'	Stadium: Čukarički Stadium; Attendance: 350; Referee: (Serbia) Milan Mitić

11 August 2024 4	Vojvodina	1–3	TSC	Bačka Topola
20:00	Ivanović 57'	Report	Ćirković 36'; Pejić 45'; Sós 90+6'	Stadium: TSC Arena; Attendance: 1,700; Referee: (Serbia) Novak Simović
Note: Playing home match at a different stadium - TSC Arena due to reconstruction on Karađorđe Stadium

19 August 2024 5	Radnički 1923	2–2	Vojvodina	Gornji Milanovac
19:00	Ortíz 40'; Vidosavljević 84' (pen.)	Report	Dele 5', 24'	Stadium: Stadion Metalac; Attendance: 1,200; Referee: (Serbia) Lazar Lukić

25 August 2024 6	Vojvodina	1–2	Napredak	Bačka Topola
19:30	Zady Sery 61'	Report	Petković 59'; Šarić 90+5'	Stadium: TSC Arena; Attendance: 1,000; Referee: (Serbia) Dejan Trifković
Note: Playing home match at a different stadium - TSC Arena due to reconstruction on Karađorđe Stadium

1 September 2024 7	Partizan	0–0	Vojvodina	Belgrade
21:05		Report		Stadium: Partizan Stadium; Attendance: 1,500; Referee: (Serbia) Miloš Milanović

14 September 2024 8	Vojvodina	2–0	Železničar	Novi Sad
18:00	Petrović 5'; Zady Sery 43'	Report		Stadium: Karađorđe Stadium; Attendance: 1,600; Referee: (Serbia) Dejan Trifković

22 September 2024 9	IMT	0–3	Vojvodina	Loznica
19:00		Report	Zady Sery 53', 70'; Poletanović 65' (pen.)	Stadium: Lagator Stadium; Attendance: 800; Referee: (Serbia) Miloš Milanović

28 September 2024 10	Vojvodina	3–3	Radnički Niš	Novi Sad
20:00	Dele 52'; Veličković 87'; Crnomarković 90+1'	Report	Stewart 57'; Ilić 61' (pen.); Yamkam 90+5'	Stadium: Karađorđe Stadium; Attendance: 850; Referee: (Serbia) Pavle Ilić

6 October 2024 11	Spartak	0–4	Vojvodina	Subotica
19:00	Prijović (red card) 28'	Report	Dele 6' (pen.); Zady Sery 40', 60'; Kokanović 73'	Stadium: Subotica City Stadium; Attendance: 700; Referee: (Serbia) Dejan Trifković

19 October 2024 12	Jedinstvo	1–1	Vojvodina	Ub
18:00	Jevtić 28'	Report	Veličković 85'	Stadium: Dragan Džajić Stadium; Attendance: 1,200; Referee: (Serbia) Aleksandar Živković

26 October 2024 13	Vojvodina	2–1	OFK Beograd	Novi Sad
20:00	Petrović 19'; Radulović 87' (pen.)	Report	Vlijter 1'; Addo (red card) 65'	Stadium: Karađorđe Stadium; Attendance: 5,300; Referee: (Serbia) Pavle Ilić

3 November 2024 14	Red Star Belgrade	3–0	Vojvodina	Belgrade
17:00	Maksimović 21'; Djiga 34'; Ndiaye 45+1'	Report		Stadium: Rajko Mitić Stadium; Attendance: 7,518; Referee: (Serbia) Danilo Nikolić

9 November 2024 15	Vojvodina	0–0	Mladost Lučani	Novi Sad
18:30		Report		Stadium: Karađorđe Stadium; Attendance: 1,000; Referee: (Serbia) Aleksandar Živković

23 November 2024 16	Vojvodina	0–0	Tekstilac	Novi Sad
19:00		Report		Stadium: Karađorđe Stadium; Attendance: 800; Referee: (Serbia) Stefan Jeknić

29 November 2024 17	Novi Pazar	0–4	Vojvodina	Novi Pazar
14:30		Report	Dele 20', 67', 76', 78'	Stadium: Novi Pazar City Stadium; Attendance: 0 Referee: (Serbia) Pavle Tomić
Note: Played without an audience

8 December 2024 18	Vojvodina	0–1	Čukarički	Novi Sad
15:00		Report	Tufegdžić 56'	Stadium: Karađorđe Stadium; Attendance: 1,312; Referee: (Serbia) Danilo Nikolić

15 December 2024 19	TSC	1–3	Vojvodina	Bačka Topola
16:30	Vulić 86' (pen.)	Report	Kokanović 23'; Dele 37'; Zady Sery 50'; Barros (red card) 85'	Stadium: TSC Arena; Attendance: 1,100; Referee: (Serbia) Miloš Milanović

21 December 2024 20	Vojvodina	3–2	Radnički 1923	Novi Sad
14:00	Nikolić U. 34' (pen.); Kokanović 45'; Zady Sery 67'	Report	Mirčetić 54' (pen.); Bevis 80'	Stadium: Karađorđe Stadium; Attendance: 1,084; Referee: (Serbia) Novak Simović

31 January 2025 21	Napredak	1–1	Vojvodina	Kruševac
17:00	Đeković 44'	Report	Kokanović 74'	Stadium: Mladost Stadium (Kruševac); Attendance: 1,400; Referee: (Serbia) Milan Stefanović

8 February 2025 22	Vojvodina	0–0	Partizan	Novi Sad
18:30		Report		Stadium: Karađorđe Stadium; Attendance: 6,200; Referee: (Serbia) Miloš Milanović

17 February 2025 23	Železničar	1–1	Vojvodina	Pančevo
17:00	Gigić 90+4'	Report	Dele 30'	Stadium: SC Mladost Stadium; Attendance: 720; Referee: (Serbia) Milan Mitić

22 February 2025 24	Vojvodina	0–1	IMT	Novi Sad
13:00		Report	Belfodil 90+5'	Stadium: Karađorđe Stadium; Attendance: 1,000; Referee: (Serbia) Lazar Lukić

26 February 2025 25	Radnički Niš	1–4	Vojvodina	Niš
18:30	Vojnović 20' (pen.); Petković (red card) 44'	Report	Petrović 45+3'; Romanić 61' (pen.); U. Nikolić 88', 90'	Stadium: Čair Stadium; Attendance: 1,000; Referee: (Serbia) Milan Stefanović

2 March 2025 26	Vojvodina	1–3	Spartak	Novi Sad
17:00	Romanić 81'	Report	Babić 38', 57'; Mijić 49'	Stadium: Karađorđe Stadium; Attendance: 2,000; Referee: (Serbia) Danilo Nikolić

9 March 2025 27	Vojvodina	1–0	Jedinstvo	Novi Sad
17:00	Dele 73'	Report		Stadium: Karađorđe Stadium; Attendance: 0 Referee: (Serbia) Pavle Tomić
Note: By decision of the FSS, Vojvodina is suspended and the match will be played without a spectators.

16 March 2025 28	OFK Beograd	3–1	Vojvodina	Zaječar
16:30	Vlijter 4'; Oliveira 34'; Stojilković 48'	Report	U. Nikolić 45'	Stadium: Kraljevica Stadium; Attendance: 350; Referee: (Serbia) Milan Ilić
Note: OFK Beograd plays home matches at Kraljevica Stadium in Zaječar due to reconstruction on Omladinski Stadium in Belgrade

29 March 2025 29	Vojvodina	3–5	Red Star Belgrade	Novi Sad
19:00	Petrović 21'; Romanić 37'; Crnomarković (red card) 57'; Dele 70'	Report	Katai 40', 49'; Seol 52'; Ndiaye 77'; Radonjić 82'	Stadium: Karađorđe Stadium; Attendance: 6,500; Referee: (Serbia) Miloš Milanović

7 April 2025 30	Mladost Lučani	1–3	Vojvodina	Lučani
18:00	Ortiz 51'	Report	Romanić 22'; Savićević 34'; Veličković 90+1'	Stadium: SRC MR Radoš Milovanović; Attendance: 160; Referee: (Serbia) Pavle Ilić

==== Championship round league table ====
Pos	Team	Pld	W	D	L	GF	GA	GD	Pts	Qualification	RSB	PAR	NPZ	OFK	RDK	VOJ	TSC	MLA
4	OFK Beograd	37	15	8	14	53	54	−1	53	Ineligible for European competitions (Note: OFK Beograd qualified for the second qualifying round of the UEFA Conference League but failed to obtain a UEFA license. As a result, the berth was given to the fifth place Radnički 1923.)			2–3		3–0	1–2		1–0
5	Radnički 1923	37	15	8	14	60	53	+7	53	Qualification for the Conference League second qualifying round	4–1		2–3				5–2	1–1
6	Vojvodina	37	14	11	12	57	49	+8	53						0–0		0–3	3–1
7	TSC	37	15	5	17	59	58	+1	50		1–2		1–2	3–2				
8	Mladost Lučani	37	12	11	14	38	48	−10	47			0–4	1–1				2–0	

Source: SuperLiga (in Serbian)
Legend: Blue = home team win; Yellow = draw; Red = away team win.
Rules for classification: 1) Points; 2) Points in regular season; 3) Head-to-head points in regular season; 4) Head-to-head goal difference in regular season; 5) Head-to-head goals scored in regular season; 6) Head-to-head away goals scored in regular season (if two teams tied); 7) Goal difference; 8) Goals scored; 9) Fair play ranking; 10) Drawing of lots.

==== Championship round result round by round ====
Round	1	2	3	4	5	6	7
Ground	H	A	H	A	A	H	A
Result	W	W	L	W	D	D	L
Position	4	4	4	3	4	4	6

Updated to match(es) played on 25 May 2025. Source: https://www.superliga.rs/sezona/tabela-takmicenja/
A = Away; H = Home; W = Win; D = Draw; L = Loss

==== Championship round matches ====
13 April 2025 31	Vojvodina	3–1	Mladost Lučani	Novi Sad
18:00	Korać 20'; Dele 25'; Petrović 85' (pen.)	Report	Tumbasević 71'	Stadium: Karađorđe Stadium; Attendance: 1,563; Referee: (Serbia) Stefan Jenkić

23 April 2025 32	Novi Pazar	0–1	Vojvodina	Novi Pazar
16:00		Report	Dele 31'	Stadium: Novi Pazar City Stadium; Attendance: 3,500; Referee: (Serbia) Miloš Milanović

27 April 2025 33	Vojvodina	0–3	TSC	Novi Sad
20:00		Report	Jovanović 49'; Pantović 55'; Mboungou 65'	Stadium: Karađorđe Stadium; Attendance: 1,520; Referee: (Serbia) Dejan Trifković

2 May 2025 34	OFK Beograd	1–2	Vojvodina	Zaječar
18:30	Knežević 49' (pen.)	Report	Butean 8'; Dele 17' (pen.)	Stadium: Kraljevica Stadium; Attendance: 200; Referee: (Serbia) Novak Simović
Note: OFK Beograd plays home matches at Kraljevica Stadium in Zaječar due to reconstruction on Omladinski Stadium in Belgrade

11 May 2025 35	Red Star Belgrade	1–1	Vojvodina	Belgrade
19:00	Šljivić 2'	Report	Medojević 84'	Stadium: Rajko Mitić Stadium; Attendance: 5,072; Referee: (Serbia) Nikolić

17 May 2025 36	Vojvodina	0–0	Radnički 1923	Novi Sad
18:30		Report		Stadium: Karađorđe Stadium; Attendance: 4,000; Referee: (Serbia) Stanko Ostraćanin

25 May 2025 37	Partizan	3–2	Vojvodina	Belgrade
19:00	Natcho 14', 71'; Vukotić 27'	Report	Romanić 57'; Kokanović 81'	Stadium: Partizan Stadium; Attendance: 3,500; Referee: (Serbia) Milan Mitić

=== Serbian Cup ===
30 October 2024 Round of 32	Radnički Sremska Mitrovica	0–1	Vojvodina	Mačvanska Mitrovica
13:00		Report	Dele 27'	Stadium: Fudbalska Akademija; Attendance: 1,000; Referee: (Serbia) Nikola Petrović

4 December 2024 Round of 16	Vojvodina	3–1	Grafičar	Novi Sad
16:00	Dele 3', 26'; Zady Sery 79'	Report	Nikolić 7'	Stadium: Karađorđe Stadium; Attendance: 1,525; Referee: (Serbia) Stanko Ostraćanin

2 April 2025 Quarter-finals	Radnički Niš	0–1	Vojvodina	Niš
16:00		Report	Depú 52'	Stadium: Čair Stadium; Attendance: 232; Referee: (Serbia) Dejan Trifković

7 May 2025 Semi-finals	Vojvodina	2–0	TSC	Novi Sad
18:30	Korać 10'; Bukinac 85'	Report		Stadium: Karađorđe Stadium; Attendance: 2,200; Referee: (Serbia) Pavle Ilić

21 May 2025 Final	Vojvodina	0–3	Red Star Belgrade	Zaječar
18:00	Sichenje (red card) 90+11'	Report	Duarte 22'; Milson 90+5'; Katai 90+12'	Stadium: Kraljevica Stadium; Attendance: 6,952; Referee: (Serbia) Pavle Ilić
Note: Neutral ground

=== UEFA Europa League ===
==== Second qualifying round ====
The draw was held on 19 June 2024.

25 July 2024 First leg	Ajax (Netherlands)	1–0	(Serbia) Vojvodina	Amsterdam, Netherlands
20:30	van den Boomen 86'	Report		Stadium: Johan Cruyff Arena; Attendance: 53,590; Referee: César Soto Grado (Spain)

1 August 2024 Second leg	Vojvodina (Serbia)	1–3 (1–4 agg.)	(Netherlands) Ajax	Bačka Topola, Serbia
20:00	Šutalo 59' (o.g.)	Report	Šutalo 53'; Hato 85'; Traoré 90+2'	Stadium: TSC Arena; Attendance: 4,412; Referee: Arda Kardeşler (Turkey)
Note: Playing home match at a different stadium - TSC Arena due to reconstruction on Karađorđe Stadium

=== UEFA Europa Conference League ===
==== Third qualifying round ====
The draw for the third qualifying round was held on 22 July 2024.

8 August 2024 First leg	Maribor (Slovenia)	2–1	(Serbia) Vojvodina	Maribor, Slovenia
20:15	Iličić 59'; Soudani 90+8'	Report	Medojević (red card) 70'; Zady Sery 77'	Stadium: Ljudski vrt Attendance: 6,850; Referee: Daniel Stefański (Poland)

15 August 2024 Second leg	Vojvodina (Serbia)	1–0 (2–2 agg.) (2–4 p)	(Slovenia) Maribor	Bačka Topola, Serbia
20:00	Crnomarković 26'	Report	Šimundža (red card) 27'	Stadium: TSC Arena; Attendance: 1,900; Referee: Gustavo Correia (Portugal)
	Penalties
	Petrović (penalty scored); Savićević (penalty scored); Nikolić (penalty missed); Ivanović (penalty missed)		(penalty scored) Mbina; (penalty scored) Soudani; (penalty scored) Repas; (penalty scored) Vrhovec
Note: Playing home match at a different stadium - TSC Arena due to reconstruction on Karađorđe Stadium

== Statistics ==
=== Squad statistics ===
No.	Pos	Nat	Player	Total		SuperLiga		Cup		Europe	
No.	Pos	Nat	Player	Apps	Goals	Apps	Goals	Apps	Goals	Apps	Goals
Goalkeepers
1	GK	(Serbia) SRB	Matija Gočmanac	15	0	15	0	0	0	0	0
12	GK	(Serbia) SRB	Dragan Rosić	24	0	19	0	5	0	0	0
37	GK	(Serbia) SRB	Ranko Puškić	0	0	0	0	0	0	0	0
Defenders
3	DF	(Serbia) SRB	Siniša Tanjga	4	0	4	0	0	0	0	0
5	DF	(Serbia) SRB	Đorđe Crnomarković	31	2	27	1	0	0	4	1
6	DF	(Luxembourg) LUX	Seid Korać	36	2	30	1	5	1	1	0
8	DF	(Serbia) SRB	Stefan Đorđević	12	0	7	0	3	0	2	0
16	DF	(Romania) ROU	Mihai Butean	37	1	29	1	4	0	4	0
23	DF	(Brazil) BRA	Lucas Barros	36	0	29	0	3	0	4	0
29	DF	(Kenya) KEN	Collins Sichenje	34	0	25	0	5	0	4	0
30	DF	(Serbia) SRB	Stefan Bukinac	12	1	10	0	2	1	0	0
78	DF	(Serbia) SRB	Luka Drobnjak	3	0	3	0	0	0	0	0
Midfielders
10	MF	(Serbia) SRB	Uroš Nikolić	29	4	23	4	3	0	3	0
18	MF	(Serbia) SRB	Njegoš Petrović	42	5	33	5	5	0	4	0
20	MF	(Serbia) SRB	Dragan Kokanović	33	5	29	5	4	0	0	0
22	MF	(Serbia) SRB	Lazar Nikolić	29	0	23	0	3	0	3	0
26	MF	(Montenegro) MNE	Vukan Savićević	36	1	27	1	5	0	4	0
34	MF	(Serbia) SRB	Slobodan Medojević	32	1	26	1	5	0	1	0
35	MF	(Serbia) SRB	Miloš Popović	4	0	4	0	0	0	0	0
39	MF	(Serbia) SRB	Marko Veličković	23	4	19	4	2	0	2	0
77	MF	(Serbia) SRB	Lazar Ranđelović	8	0	7	0	1	0	0	0
Forwards
7	FW	(Nigeria) NGR	Bamidele Yusuf	41	18	34	15	3	3	4	0
9	FW	(Serbia) SRB	Aleksa Vukanović	7	1	4	1	1	0	2	0
11	FW	(Serbia) SRB	Marko Mladenović	16	0	13	0	3	0	0	0
19	FW	(Democratic Republic of the Congo) COD	Jonathan Bolingi	6	0	5	0	1	0	0	0
27	FW	(Serbia) SRB	Petar Sukačev	3	0	3	0	0	0	0	0
33	FW	(Serbia) SRB	Vuk Boškan	1	0	0	0	1	0	0	0
91	FW	(Serbia) SRB	Lazar Romanić	20	5	17	5	3	0	0	0
99	FW	(Angola) ANG	Depú	25	1	21	0	4	1	0	0
Players transferred out during the season
25	GK	(Montenegro) MNE	Lazar Carević	7	0	3	0	0	0	4	0
11	FW	(Serbia) SRB	Mihailo Ivanović	10	1	6	1	0	0	4	0
49	MF	(Montenegro) MNE	Andrija Radulović	21	3	17	3	2	0	2	0
47	MF	(Serbia) SRB	Mihajlo Butraković	0	0	0	0	0	0	0	0
4	MF	(Serbia) SRB	Marko Poletanović	20	1	16	1	1	0	3	0
14	MF	(Ivory Coast) CIV	Caleb Zady Sery	32	10	26	8	2	1	4	1

Last updated: 25 May 2025
Source: Competitions

=== Goal scorers ===
Rank	No.	Pos	Nat	Name	SuperLiga	Serbian Cup	Europe	Total
1	7	FW	(Nigeria)	Bamidele Yusuf	15	3	0	18
2	14	MF	(Ivory Coast)	Caleb Zady Sery	8	1	1	10
3	18	MF	(Serbia)	Njegoš Petrović	5	0	0	5
3	91	FW	(Serbia)	Lazar Romanić	5	0	0	5
3	20	MF	(Serbia)	Dragan Kokanović	5	0	0	5
4	10	MF	(Serbia)	Uroš Nikolić	4	0	0	4
4	39	FW	(Serbia)	Marko Veličković	4	0	0	4
5	49	MF	(Montenegro)	Andrija Radulović	3	0	0	3
6	5	DF	(Serbia)	Đorđe Crnomarković	1	0	1	2
6	6	DF	(Luxembourg)	Seid Korać	1	1	0	2
7	9	MF	(Serbia)	Aleksa Vukanović	1	0	0	1
7	99	FW	(Angola)	Depú	0	1	0	1
7	26	MF	(Montenegro)	Vukan Savićević	1	0	0	1
7	34	MF	(Serbia)	Slobodan Medojević	1	0	0	1
7	16	DF	(Romania)	Mihai Butean	1	0	0	1
7	30	DF	(Serbia)	Stefan Bukinac	0	1	0	1
7	4	MF	(Serbia)	Marko Poletanović	1	0	0	1
7	11	FW	(Serbia)	Mihailo Ivanović	1	0	0	1
7				Own goal	0	0	1	1
Totals					57	7	3	67

Last updated: 25 May 2025

=== Clean sheets ===
Rank	No.	Pos	Nat	Name	SuperLiga	Serbian Cup	Europe	Total
1	12	GK	(Serbia)	Dragan Rosić	6	3	0	9
2	1	GK	(Serbia)	Matija Gočmanac	5	0	0	5
3	25	GK	(Montenegro)	Lazar Carević	0	0	1	1
Totals					11	3	1	15

Last updated: 25 May 2025

=== Disciplinary record ===
Number	Nation	Position	Name	SuperLiga		Serbian Cup		Europe		Total	
Number	Nation	Position	Name	Yellow card	Red card	Yellow card	Red card	Yellow card	Red card	Yellow card	Red card
1	(Serbia)	GK	Matija Gočmanac	1	0	0	0	0	0	1	0
3	(Serbia)	DF	Siniša Tanjga	2	0	0	0	0	0	2	0
4	(Serbia)	MF	Marko Poletanović	1	0	0	0	0	0	1	0
5	(Serbia)	DF	Đorđe Crnomarković	10	1	0	0	2	0	12	1
6	(Luxembourg)	DF	Seid Korać	9	0	1	0	0	0	10	0
7	(Nigeria)	FW	Bamidele Yusuf	7	0	1	0	1	0	9	0
9	(Serbia)	FW	Aleksa Vukanović	0	0	1	0	1	0	2	0
10	(Serbia)	MF	Uroš Nikolić	2	0	0	0	0	0	2	0
11	(Serbia)	FW	Marko Mladenović	1	0	1	0	0	0	2	0
12	(Serbia)	GK	Dragan Rosić	2	0	0	0	0	0	2	0
14	(Ivory Coast)	MF	Caleb Zady Sery	0	0	0	0	1	0	1	0
16	(Romania)	DF	Mihai Butean	6	0	0	0	1	0	7	0
18	(Serbia)	MF	Njegoš Petrović	6	0	2	0	2	0	10	0
20	(Serbia)	MF	Dragan Kokanović	4	0	1	0	0	0	5	0
22	(Serbia)	MF	Lazar Nikolić	2	0	0	0	0	0	2	0
23	(Brazil)	DF	Lucas Barros	5	1	1	0	0	0	7	1
26	(Montenegro)	MF	Vukan Savićević	4	0	1	0	1	0	6	0
27	(Serbia)	FW	Petar Sukačev	1	0	0	0	0	0	1	0
29	(Kenya)	DF	Collins Sichenje	7	0	2	1	0	0	9	1
30	(Serbia)	DF	Stefan Bukinac	0	0	1	0	0	0	1	0
34	(Serbia)	MF	Slobodan Medojević	3	0	0	0	0	1	3	1
39	(Serbia)	FW	Marko Veličković	2	0	0	0	0	0	2	0
49	(Montenegro)	MF	Andrija Radulović	1	0	0	0	0	0	1	0
77	(Serbia)	MF	Lazar Ranđelović	1	0	0	0	0	0	1	0
78	(Serbia)	DF	Luka Drobnjak	2	0	0	0	0	0	2	0
91	(Serbia)	FW	Lazar Romanić	2	0	0	0	0	0	2	0
99	(Angola)	FW	Depú	0	0	1	0	0	0	1	0
			TOTALS	81	2	13	1	9	1	103	4

Last updated: 25 May 2025

=== Game as captain ===
Rank	No.	Pos	Nat	Name	SuperLiga	Serbian Cup	Europe	Total
1	34	MF	(Serbia)	Slobodan Medojević	19	3	0	22
2	18	MF	(Serbia)	Njegoš Petrović	15	2	4	21
3	4	MF	(Serbia)	Marko Poletanović	2	0	0	2
4	11	FW	(Serbia)	Mihailo Ivanović	1	0	0	1
Totals					37	5	4	46

Last updated: 25 May 2025

=== Attendances ===
	Matches	Attendances	Average	High	Low
SuperLiga	18	38,628	2,146	6,500	800
Serbian Cup	2	3,725	1,863	2,200	1,525
Europe	2	6,312	3,156	4,412	1,900
Total	22	48,665	2,212	6,500	800

Last updated: 25 May 2025
