= 2024–25 Serbian Cup =

Tournament details
- Country: Serbia
- Teams: 38

Final positions
- Champions: Red Star Belgrade
- Runners-up: Vojvodina
- Semifinalists: TSC; Napredak

Tournament statistics
- Matches played: 21
- Goals scored: 65 (3.1 per match)

The 2024–25 Serbian Cup season was the nineteenth season of the Serbian national football cup competition. It started on 11 September 2024, and ended on 21 May 2025.

== Calendar ==
Round	Date(s)	Number of fixtures	Clubs	New entries this round
Preliminary round	11 September 2024	5	38 → 32	10
Round of 32	30 October 2024	16	32 → 16	27
Round of 16	4 December 2024	8	16 → 8	none
Quarter-finals	2 April 2025	4	8 → 4	none
Semi-finals	7 May 2025	2	4 → 2	none
Final	21 May 2025	1	2 → 1	none

== Preliminary round ==
A preliminary round was held in order to reduce the number of teams competing in the first round to 32. It consisted of 5 single-legged ties, with a penalty shoot-out as the decider if the score was tied after 90 minutes.

11 September 2024	Pusta reka (V)	1–1 (3–5 p)	Trepča (IV)	Bojnik
16:00	Arsić 35'		Vesković 40'	Stadium: Stadion FK Pusta reka

11 September 2024	Hajduk Divoš (III)	2–3	Novi Sad 1921 (III)	Divoš
16:00	Cvijić 53'; Tomac 86'		Obradović 73'; Janjić 77'; Vučetić 84'	Stadium: Stadion FK Hajduk

11 September 2024	FAP (III)	2–1	Metalac Gornji Milanovac (III)	Priboj
16:00	Otašević 21'; Stajović 46'		Riznić 50'	Stadium: Gradski stadion

11 September 2024	Zemun (II)	3–1	Kolubara (III)	Belgrade
16:00	Stoisavljević 47', 67'; Petrović 60'		Blagojević 31'	Stadium: Zemun Stadium

11 September 2024	Mladost GAT (II)	1–0	Radnički Novi Beograd (III)	Novi Sad
16:00	Tanjga 35'			Stadium: Karađorđe Stadium

== Round of 32 ==
Draw for the first round took place on 17 October 2024. Matches were played on 30 October 2024. It consisted of 16 single-legged ties, with a penalty shoot-out as the decider if the score was tied after 90 minutes.

30 October 2024	GFK Dubočica (II)	0–2	Mladost Lučani	Leskovac
13:00		Report	Cvetinović 45'; Bondžulić 84'	Stadium: Dubočica Stadium; Referee: Stefan Đokić

30 October 2024	OFK Vršac (II)	1–1 (3–5 p)	TSC Bačka Topola	Vršac
13:00	Ansah 86'	Report	Banjac 39' (pen.)	Stadium: Gradski stadion Referee: Nikola Bikić
	Penalties
	Koloni (penalty missed); Grek (penalty scored); Radosavljević (penalty scored); Ansah (penalty scored)		(penalty scored) Stevanović; (penalty scored) Milosavljević; (penalty scored) Stanić; (penalty scored) Petrović; (penalty scored) Radojević

30 October 2024	Novi Sad 1921 (III)	1–2	Spartak	Novi Sad
13:00	Volarević 70'	Report	Janjić 38' (o.g.); Ranđelović 43' (o.g.)	Stadium: Stadion Detelinara; Attendance: Marko Gnjatović

30 October 2024	Trepča (IV)	0–6	Radnički Niš	Baljevac na Ibru
13:00		Report	Baščarević 22' (o.g.); Ivelja 25', 86'; Nikolić 62'; Stewart 70'; Terzić 76'	Stadium: Stadion FK Baljevac; Referee: Miroslav Miletić

30 October 2024	Radnički Sremska Mitrovica (II)	0–1	Vojvodina	Mačvanska Mitrovica
13:00		Report	Dele 27'	Stadium: Fudbalska Akademija; Referee: Nikola Petrović

30 October 2024	Grafičar (II)	2–1	Železničar Pančevo	Belgrade
13:00	Stojanović 54', 55'	Report	Ezeh 16'	Stadium: Stadion Rajko Mitić - pomoćni teren Referee: Miroslav Milenković

30 October 2024	Zemun (II)	1–2	Javor Matis (II)	Belgrade
13:00	Diallo 71'	Report	Zuvić 9'; Stojanović 13'	Stadium: Zemun Stadium; Referee: David Matić

30 October 2024	FAP (III)	2–3	Radnik Surdulica (II)	Priboj
13:00	Bojović 57', 61'	Report	Pavlov 24'; Stojanović 41'; Tomašević 55'	Stadium: Gradski stadion Referee: Nikola Đorđević

30 October 2024	Inđija (II)	0–1	Radnički 1923	Inđija
13:00		Report	Evandro 15' (pen.)	Stadium: Inđija Stadium; Referee: Milan Balinovac

30 October 2024	Smederevo 1924 (II)	1–3	Novi Pazar	Smederevo
13:00	Marković 86'	Report	Opara 34'; Brahić 75', 90+1'	Stadium: Smederevo Stadium; Referee: Miroslav Matić

30 October 2024	OFK Beograd	2–2 (4–3 p)	Voždovac (II)	Zaječar
15:00	Marković 47'; Vlijter 90+3'	Report	Furtula 33'; Dimić 85'	Stadium: Stadion Kraljevica; Referee: Mladen Jakovljević
	Penalties
	N. Knežević (penalty scored); Vlijter (penalty scored); Halabrin (penalty scored); Bermúdez (penalty scored)		(penalty missed) Kolarević; (penalty scored) Belić; (penalty scored) Nedeljković; (penalty scored) D. Knežević; (penalty missed) Dimić

30 October 2024	Jedinstvo Ub	0–1	Čukarički	Ub
16:00		Report	Tufegdžić 69'	Stadium: Stadion Dragan Džajić; Referee: Ivan Stamenković

30 October 2024	Sloboda Užice (II)	2–2 (1–3 p)	Napredak Kruševac	Užice
17:00	Pavlović 7', 35'	Report	Šarić 37'; Obradović 90+1'	Stadium: Radomir Antić Stadium; Referee: Ljubiša Borisavljević
	Penalties
	Zogović (penalty missed); Glišović (penalty scored); Rašković (penalty missed); Starčević (penalty scored)		(penalty scored) Šarić; (penalty missed) Marinković; (penalty scored) Obradović; (penalty scored) Luković; (penalty scored) Bastajić

30 October 2024	Tekstilac Odžaci	0–7	Red Star	Belgrade
17:00		Report	Katai 8' (pen.), 29', 59'; Maksimović 12' (pen.); Ilić 57'; Sremčević 64', 89'	Stadium: Rajko Mitić Stadium; Referee: Andrija Stojanović

30 October 2024	Mačva Šabac (II)	0–1	IMT	Šabac
18:00		Report	Radočaj 40'	Stadium: Stadion FK Mačva; Referee: Stefan Jeknić

30 October 2024	Mladost GAT (II)	0–3	Partizan	Novi Sad
19:00		Report	Zubairu 15'; Ilić 56'; Nikolić 83'	Stadium: Karađorđe Stadium; Referee: Milan Stefanović

== Round of 16 ==
Draw for the second round took place on 25 November 2024. Seeding of the teams was determined based on the league performances from previous season. Matches were played on 4 December 2024. It consisted of 8 single-legged ties, with a penalty shoot-out as the decider if the score was tied after 90 minutes.

4 December 2024	Vojvodina	3–1	Grafičar (II)	Novi Sad
16:00	Dele 3', 26'; Zady Sery 79'	Report	Nikolić 8'	Stadium: Karađorđe Stadium; Referee: Stanko Ostraćanin

12 March 2025	Čukarički	0–2	Radnički Niš	Belgrade
				Stadium: Čukarički Stadium

4 December 2024	Napredak	0–0 (5–4 p)	Javor Matis (II)	Kruševac
16:00		Report		Stadium: Mladost Stadium; Referee: Ivan Stamenković
	Penalties
	Tošeski (penalty scored); Marjanović (penalty scored); Đeković (penalty scored); Bubanj (penalty scored); Marinković (penalty scored)		(penalty missed) Mićić; (penalty scored) Milošević; (penalty scored) Zuvić; (penalty scored) Žunić; (penalty scored) Skoko

4 December 2024	Mladost Lučani	1–2	IMT	Lučani
14:00	Ljubomirac 39'	Report	Stevanović 18'; Jović 89'	Stadium: Mladost Stadium; Referee: Stefan Jeknić

26 March 2025	Red Star	5–3	OFK Beograd	Belgrade
17:00	Katai 12', 61'; Ivanić 18'; Maksimović 34'; Radonjić 50'	Report	Momčilović 3'; Marković 29', 35' (pen.)	Stadium: Rajko Mitić Stadium; Referee: Jovan Šegrt

12 March 2025	Radnik Surdulica	0–3	Partizan	Surdulica
			Vukotić 24'; Kovač 32'; Zubairu 59'	Stadium: Surdulica City Stadium

12 March 2025	TSC	2–1	Spartak	Bačka Topola
	Stanić 59'; Miloš Pantović 73'		Nenad Lukić 36'	Stadium: TSC Arena

4 December 2024	Novi Pazar	2–0	Radnički 1923	Novi Pazar
14:00	Adeshina 7'; Islamović 77'	Report		Stadium: Novi Pazar City Stadium; Referee: Nikola Radaković

== Quarter-finals ==
2 April 2025	Radnički Niš	0–1	Vojvodina	Niš
16:00		Report	Depú 52'	Stadium: Čair Stadium

2 April 2025	Napredak	2–1	IMT	Kruševac
16:30	Bastajić 81'; Luković 89'	Report	Belfodil 32'	Stadium: Mladost Stadium

2 April 2025	Partizan	0–0 (9–10 p)	TSC	Belgrade
17:30		Report		Stadium: Partizan Stadium

2 April 2025	Red Star	2–1	Novi Pazar	Belgrade
19:00	Ndiaye 6'; Elšnik 20'	Report	Cissé 29'	Stadium: Rajko Mitić Stadium; Referee: Nikola Radaković

== Semi-finals ==
Draw for the semi-finals took place on 15 April 2025. Matches were played on 7 May 2025. It consisted of 2 single-legged ties, with a penalty shoot-out as the decider if the score was tied after 90 minutes.

7 May 2025	Vojvodina	2–0	TSC	Vojvodina
16:00	Korać 10'; Bukinac 85'	Report		Stadium: Karađorđe Stadium; Referee: Pavle Ilić

7 May 2025	Red Star	4–2	Napredak	Belgrade
19:00	Duarte 3', 45'; Elšnik 49'; Ilić 64'	Report	Bukorac 6'; Bubanj 37' (pen.)	Stadium: Rajko Mitić Stadium; Referee: Miloš Milanović

== Final ==
21 May 2025
18:00 CEST (UTC+2)

Vojvodina	0–3	Red Star
	Report	Duarte 22'; Milson 90+5'; Katai 90+12'

Kraljevica Stadium, Zaječar
Attendance: 7,000
Referee: Pavle Ilić

GK	12	(Serbia) Dragan Rosić
RB	16	(Romania) Mihai Butean
CB	6	(Luxembourg) Seid Korać
CB	29	(Kenya) Collins Sichenje (yellow card) 53' (yellow-red card) 90+11'
LB	23	(Brazil) Lucas Barros (yellow card) 76'	(substituted off) 85'
CM	34	(Serbia) Slobodan Medojević (c)
CM	18	(Serbia) Njegoš Petrović (yellow card) 83'
CM	26	(Montenegro) Vukan Savićević	(substituted off) 46'
RF	10	(Serbia) Uroš Nikolić	(substituted off) 46'
CF	91	(Serbia) Lazar Romanić	(substituted off) 77'
LF	7	(Nigeria) Bamidele Yusuf	(substituted off) 86'
Substitutes:
GK	1	(Serbia) Matija Gočmanac
GK	37	(Serbia) Ranko Puškić
DF	5	(Serbia) Đorđe Crnomarković
DF	8	(Serbia) Stefan Đorđević
DF	22	(Serbia) Lazar Nikolić	(substituted on) 85'
DF	30	(Serbia) Stefan Bukinac
MF	11	(Serbia) Marko Mladenović
MF	20	(Serbia) Dragan Kokanović (yellow card) 50'	(substituted on) 46'
MF	39	(Serbia) Marko Veličković	(substituted on) 46'
FW	9	(Serbia) Aleksa Vukanović (yellow card) 25'	(substituted on) 86'
FW	99	(Angola) Depú	(substituted on) 77'
Manager:
(Serbia) Miroslav Tanjga

GK	18	(Israel) Omri Glazer
RB	66	(South Korea) Seol Young-woo
CB	44	(Serbia) Veljko Milosavljević (yellow card) 17'
CB	30	(Montenegro) Andrej Đurić
LB	88	(Ghana) Ebenezer Annan	(substituted off) 58'
DM	6	(Bosnia and Herzegovina) Rade Krunić
DM	21	(Slovenia) Timi Max Elšnik
RM	55	(Serbia) Andrija Maksimović	(substituted off) 69'
CM	4	(Montenegro) Mirko Ivanić	(substituted off) 90+8'
LM	17	(Brazil) Bruno Duarte	(substituted off) 69'
CF	9	(Senegal) Cherif Ndiaye
Substitutes:
GK	77	(Serbia) Ivan Guteša
DF	3	(Colombia) Keimer Sandoval
DF	23	(Serbia) Milan Rodić	(substituted on) 58'
DF	47	(Serbia) Strahinja Stojković
MF	7	(Serbia) Jovan Šljivić
MF	8	(Gabon) Guélor Kanga	(substituted on) 90+8'
MF	10	(Serbia) Aleksandar Katai	(substituted on) 69'
MF	27	(Angola) Felício Milson	(substituted on) 69'
MF	32	(Serbia) Luka Ilić
MF	49	(Serbia) Nemanja Radonjić
FW	14	(Nigeria) Peter Olayinka
Manager:
(Serbia) Vladan Milojević
