= 2024–25 Red Star Belgrade season =

Red Star Belgrade
2024–25 season
- Chairman: Zvezdan Terzić
- Manager: Vladan Milojević
- Stadium: Rajko Mitić Stadium
- Serbian SuperLiga: 1st (champions)
- Serbian Cup: Winners
- UEFA Champions League: League stage
- Top goalscorer: League: Cherif Ndiaye (19); All: Cherif Ndiaye (22)
- Average home league attendance: 10,719
Home colours	Away colours	Third colours
- All statistics correct as of 25 May 2025.

The 2024–25 Red Star Belgrade season was the club's 19th in the Serbian SuperLiga and 79th consecutive season in topflight of Yugoslav and Serbian football. The club participated in the Serbian SuperLiga, Serbian Cup and UEFA Champions League.

Red Star secured the league title with a 3–1 win over OFK Beograd on 6 April 2025, with seven fixtures left to go. Red Star would go on to win a league and cup double, securing their 11th Serbian league title and their 8th Serbian Cup, both national records.

== Transfers ==
=== In ===
Date	Pos.	Player	From	Fee	Ref.
18 June 2025	DF	(Ghana) Ebenezer Annan	(Italy) Bologna	Undisclosed	
29 June 2024	DF	(South Korea) Seol Young-woo	(South Korea) Ulsan HD	Undisclosed	
13 July 2024	FW	(Brazil) Bruno Duarte	(Portugal) Farense	€2,000,000	
26 July 2024	MF	(Angola) Felício Milson	(Israel) Maccabi Tel Aviv	€4,500,000	
29 July 2024	MF	(Slovenia) Timi Max Elšnik	(Slovenia) Olimpija Ljubljana	€1,500,000	
3 September 2024	MF	(Bosnia and Herzegovina) Rade Krunić	(Turkey) Fenerbahçe	Undisclosed	
3 September 2024	MF	(Democratic Republic of the Congo) Silas	(Germany) Stuttgart	Loan	

=== Out ===
Date	Pos.	Player	To	Fee	Ref.
30 May 2024	MF	(Ghana) Osman Bukari	(United States) Austin FC	$7,000,000	
21 June 2024	MF	(New Zealand) Marko Stamenić	(England) Nottingham Forest	Undisclosed (Note: Transfer fee reported as £4.6m)	
1 July 2024	FW	(Ivory Coast) Jean-Philippe Krasso	(France) Paris FC	Undisclosed	
1 July 2024	DF	(Ghana) Ebenezer Annan	(Serbia) OFK Beograd	Loan	
30 July 2024	DF	(Austria) Aleksandar Dragović	Austria Wien	Free	
2 September 2024	DF	(South Korea) Hwang In-beom	(Netherlands) Feyenoord	Undisclosed	
18 February 2025	DF	(Serbia) Uroš Spajić	(China) Beijing Guoan	Undisclosed	

== Competitions ==
=== Overall record ===
Competition	First match	Last match	Starting round	Final position	Record							
Competition	First match	Last match	Starting round	Final position	Pld	W	D	L	GF	GA	GD	Win %
Serbian SuperLiga	19 July 2024	25 May 2025	Matchday 1	Winners	37	32	4	1	123	35	+88	86.49
Serbian Cup	30 October 2024	21 May 2025	Round of 32	Winners	5	5	0	0	21	6	+15	100.00
UEFA Champions League	20 August 2024	29 January 2025	Play-off round	League stage	10	3	0	7	16	24	−8	30.00
Total					52	40	4	8	160	65	+95	76.92

Last updated: 21 May 2025
Source: FBREF

=== Serbian Superliga ===
==== Regular season ====
===== League table =====
Pos	Team	Pld	W	D	L	GF	GA	GD	Pts	Qualification
1	Red Star Belgrade	30	28	2	0	106	22	+84	86	Qualification for the Championship round
2	Partizan	30	18	9	3	58	29	+29	63	Qualification for the Championship round
3	OFK Beograd	30	13	7	10	40	39	+1	46	Qualification for the Championship round
4	Radnički 1923	30	13	6	11	47	40	+7	45	Qualification for the Championship round
5	Vojvodina	30	11	9	10	48	40	+8	42	Qualification for the Championship round

Source: SuperLiga (in Serbian)
Rules for classification: 1) Points; 2) Head-to-head points; 3) Head-to-head goal difference; 4) Head-to-head goals scored; 5) Head-to-head away goals scored (if two teams tied); 6) Goal difference; 7) Goals scored; 8) Fair play ranking; 9) Draw.

==== Results summary ====
Overall								Home						Away					
Pld	W	D	L	GF	GA	GD	Pts	W	D	L	GF	GA	GD	W	D	L	GF	GA	GD
27	21	3	3	80	20	+60	66	11	1	1	47	6	+41	10	2	2	33	14	+19

==== Results by round ====
Round	1	2	3	4	5	6	7	8	9	10	11	12	13	14	15	16	17	18	19	20	21	22	23	24	25	26	27	28	29	30
Ground	H	H	A	H	A	H	A	H	A	H	A	H	A	H	A	A	A	H	A	H	A	H	A	H	A	H	A	H	A	H
Result	W	D	W	W	W	W	W	W	W	W	W	W	W	W	W	W	W	W	W	W	W	W	W	D	W	W	W	W	W	W
Position	1	2	2	2	2	2	2	1	1	1	1	1	1	1	1	1	1	1	1	1	1	1	1	1	1	1	1	1	1	1

A = Away; H = Home; W = Win; D = Draw; L = Loss; P = Postponed

==== Matches ====
20 July 2024 1	Red Star Belgrade	4-0	Jedinstvo	Belgrade
20:00	Ndiaye 18', 22'; Katai 53'; Bruno 70'			Stadium: Rajko Mitić Stadium; Attendance: 12,000; Referee: Milos Milanovic

27 July 2024 2	Red Star Belgrade	2-2	Mladost Lučani	Belgrade
20:00	Bruno 85'; Ndiaye 90+1'		Ndiaye 19'; Ćirković 39'	Stadium: Rajko Mitić Stadium; Attendance: 11,000; Referee: Milan Ilic

3 August 2024 3	Tekstilac	0-4	Red Star Belgrade	Bačka Palanka
20:00			Milson 53'; Ndiaye 63'; Elšnik 68'; Bruno 83'	Stadium: Stadion Slavko Maletin Vava; Attendance: 2,500; Referee: Danilo Nikolic

10 August 2024 4	Red Star Belgrade	4-1	Novi Pazar	Belgrade
20:00	Seol 9'; Bruno 60'; Elšnik 80'; Puma 86'		Opara 51'	Stadium: Rajko Mitić Stadium; Attendance: 7,000; Referee: Nikola Radakovic

15 August 2024 5	Čukarički	1-4	Red Star Belgrade	Pančevo
20:00	Mello 69'		Olayinka 15', 17'; Sissoko 77' (o.g.); Ilić 89'	Stadium: Stadion SC Mladost; Attendance: 2,000; Referee: Jovan Segrt

1 September 2024 7	Radnički 1923	0-1	Red Star Belgrade	Gornji Milanovac
19:00			Ivanić 85'	Stadium: Stadion Metalac; Attendance: 3,500; Referee: Milan Ilic

14 September 2024 8	Red Star Belgrade	2-0	Napredak Kruševac	Belgrade
19:00	Bruno 29' (pen.); Ivanić 47'			Stadium: Rajko Mitić Stadium; Attendance: 14,000; Referee: Pavle Ilic

23 September 2024 9	Partizan	0-4	Red Star Belgrade	Belgrade
19:00			Ndiaye 25' (pen.), 55', 65'; Silas 45+2'	Stadium: Partizan Stadium; Attendance: 15,000; Referee: Novak Simovic

27 September 2024 10	Red Star Belgrade	2-1	Železničar Pančevo	Belgrade
19:00	Drkušić 33'; Ilić 70'		Ezeh 60'	Stadium: Rajko Mitić Stadium; Attendance: 6,000; Referee: Srdjan Jovanovic

6 October 2024 11	IMT	1-3	Red Star Belgrade	Loznica
19:00	Court 56'		Milson 35'; Rodić 65'; Silas 90+2'	Stadium: Lagator Stadium; Attendance: 4,000; Referee: Jovan Segrt

18 October 2024 12	Red Star Belgrade	5-1	Radnički Niš	Belgrade
16:00	Ilić 4', 33', 43'; Katai 58', 60'		Ivelja 89'	Stadium: Rajko Mitić Stadium; Attendance: 7,000; Referee: Marko Ivkovic

26 October 2024 13	Spartak Subotica	1-5	Red Star Belgrade	Subotica
18:00	Bijelović 58'		Silas 18'; Rodić 41'; Ndiaye 51' (pen.); Milson 62'; Katai 72'	Stadium: Subotica City Stadium; Attendance: 6,000; Referee: Nikola Radakovic

3 November 2024 14	Red Star Belgrade	3-0	Vojvodina	Belgrade
17:00	Maksimović 20'; Djiga 33'; Ndiaye 45'			Stadium: Rajko Mitić Stadium; Attendance: 7,000; Referee: Danilo Nikolic

10 November 2024 15	OFK Beograd	0-1	Red Star Belgrade	Zaječar
17:00			Leković 67'	Stadium: Kraljevica Stadium; Attendance: 6,000; Referee: Jovan Segrt

30 November 2024 17	Mladost Lučani	0-2	Red Star Belgrade	Lučani
17:00			Silas 14'; Katai 47'	Stadium: SRC MR Radoš Milovanović; Attendance: 1,000; Referee: Predrag Janjus

4 December 2024 6	Red Star Belgrade	3-1	TSC	Belgrade
18:30	Bruno 17'; Spajić 38' (pen.); Elšnik 62'		Ćirković 80'	Stadium: Rajko Mitić Stadium; Attendance: 3,000; Referee: Pavle Ilic
Note: Game was originally scheduled on 24 August 2024, but was postponed to 4 December due to Red Star match in the UEFA Champions League

7 December 2024 18	Red Star Belgrade	6-0	Tekstilac	Belgrade
17:00	Ilić 10', 14', 67', 90'; Ndiaye 17'; Katai 62'			Stadium: Rajko Mitić Stadium; Attendance: 7,000; Referee: David Matic

==== Championship round ====
Pos	Team	Pld	W	D	L	GF	GA	GD	Pts	Qualification	RSB	PAR	NPZ	OFK	RDK	VOJ	TSC	MLA
1	Red Star Belgrade (C)	37	32	4	1	123	35	+88	100	Qualification for the Champions League second qualifying round		2–1		5–2		1–1		3–1
2	Partizan	37	21	10	6	73	40	+33	73	Qualification for the Europa League first qualifying round (Note: The winner of the 2024–25 Serbian Cup (Red Star Belgrade) qualifies for the Europa League first qualifying round, so the second place team (Partizan) takes the Europa League berth and the fourth place team gets a Conference League berth.)				2–2	3–1	3–2	1–2	
3	Novi Pazar	37	15	9	13	60	65	−5	54	Qualification for the Conference League second qualifying round	3–3	2–1				0–1		
4	OFK Beograd	37	15	8	14	53	54	−1	53	Ineligible for European competitions (Note: OFK Beograd qualified for the second qualifying round of the UEFA Conference League but failed to obtain a UEFA license. As a result, the berth was given to the fifth place Radnički 1923.)			2–3		3–0	1–2		1–0
5	Radnički 1923	37	15	8	14	60	53	+7	53	Qualification for the Conference League second qualifying round	4–1		2–3				5–2	1–1

Source: SuperLiga (in Serbian)
Legend: Blue = home team win; Yellow = draw; Red = away team win.
Rules for classification: 1) Points; 2) Points in regular season; 3) Head-to-head points in regular season; 4) Head-to-head goal difference in regular season; 5) Head-to-head goals scored in regular season; 6) Head-to-head away goals scored in regular season (if two teams tied); 7) Goal difference; 8) Goals scored; 9) Fair play ranking; 10) Drawing of lots.
(C) Champions

=== Serbian Cup ===
30 October 2024 Round of 32	Tekstilac Odžaci	0–7	Red Star	Belgrade
17:00		Report	Katai 8' (pen.), 29', 59'; Maksimović 12' (pen.); Ilić 57'; Sremčević 64', 89'	Stadium: Rajko Mitić Stadium; Attendance: 1,000; Referee: Andrija Stojanović

26 March 2025 Round of 16	Red Star	5–3	OFK Beograd	Belgrade
17:00	Katai 12', 61'; Ivanić 18'; Maksimović 34'; Radonjić 50'	Report	Momčilović 3'; Marković 29', 35' (pen.)	Stadium: Rajko Mitić Stadium; Attendance: 0 Referee: Jovan Šegrt

2 April 2025 Quarter-final	Red Star	2–1	Novi Pazar	Belgrade
19:00	Ndiaye 6'; Elšnik 20'	Report	Cissé 29'	Stadium: Rajko Mitić Stadium; Attendance: 2,000; Referee: Nikola Radaković

7 May 2025 Semi-final	Red Star	4–2	Napredak	Belgrade
19:00	Duarte 3', 45'; Elšnik 49'; Ilić 64'	Report	Bukorac 6'; Bubanj 37' (pen.)	Stadium: Rajko Mitić Stadium; Attendance: 1,000; Referee: Miloš Milanović

21 May 2025 Final	Vojvodina	0–3	Red Star	Kraljevica Stadium, Zaječar
18:00 CEST (UTC+2)		Report	Duarte 22'; Milson 90+5'; Katai 90+12'	Attendance: 7,000; Referee: Pavle Ilić

=== UEFA Champions League ===
==== Play-off round ====
The draw for the play-off round was held on 5 August 2024.

20 August 2024 First leg	Bodø/Glimt (Norway)	2–1	(Serbia) Red Star	Aspmyra Stadion, Bodø
21:00	Bjørtuft 52'; Määttä 62'	Report	Mimović 75'	Attendance: 7,909; Referee: Ivan Kružliak (Slovakia)

28 August 2024 Second leg	Red Star Belgrade (Serbia)	2–0 (3–2 agg.)	(Norway) Bodø/Glimt	Red Star Stadium, Belgrade
21:00	Duarte 26' (pen.); Spajić 59'	Report		Attendance: 46,167; Referee: Davide Massa (Italy)

==== League phase ====
The league phase draw was held on 29 August 2024.

Pos	Team	Pld	W	D	L	GF	GA	GD	Pts
27	(Ukrainian Association of Football) Shakhtar Donetsk	8	2	1	5	8	16	−8	7
28	(Italian Football Federation) Bologna	8	1	3	4	4	9	−5	6
29	(Football Association of Serbia) Red Star Belgrade	8	2	0	6	13	22	−9	6
30	(Austrian Football Association) Sturm Graz	8	2	0	6	5	14	−9	6
31	(Football Association of the Czech Republic) Sparta Prague	8	1	1	6	7	21	−14	4

Source: UEFA
Rules for classification: League phase tiebreakers

19 September 2024 1	Red Star (Serbia)	1–2	(Portugal) Benfica	Red Star Stadium, Belgrade
18:45	Milson 86'	Report	Aktürkoğlu 9'; Kökçü 29'	Attendance: 44,238; Referee: Michael Oliver (England)

1 October 2024 2	Inter Milan (Italy)	4–0	(Serbia) Red Star	San Siro, Milan
21:00	Çalhanoğlu 11'; Arnautović 59'; L. Martínez 71'; Taremi 81' (pen.)	Report		Attendance: 56,391; Referee: Felix Zwayer (Germany)

22 October 2024 3	Monaco (France)	5–1	(Serbia) Red Star	Stade Louis II, Monaco
18:45	Minamino 20', 70'; Embolo 45+4'; Singo 54'; Akliouche 90+7'	Report	Ndiaye 27' (pen.)	Attendance: 9,590; Referee: Tobias Stieler (Germany)

6 November 2024 4	Red Star (Serbia)	2–5	(Spain) Barcelona	Red Star Stadium, Belgrade
21:00	Silas 27'; Milson 84'	Report	Martínez 13'; Lewandowski 43', 53'; Raphinha 55'; López 76'	Attendance: 48,886; Referee: Espen Eskås (Norway)

27 November 2024 5	Red Star (Serbia)	5–1	(Germany) VfB Stuttgart	Red Star Stadium, Belgrade
18:45	Silas 12'; Krunić 31'; Ivanić 65'; Radonjić 69', 88'	Report	Demirović 5'	Attendance: 41,372; Referee: Erik Lambrechts (Belgium)

11 December 2024 6	Milan (Italy)	2–1	(Serbia) Red Star	San Siro, Milan
21:00	Leão 42'; Abraham 87'	Report	Radonjić 67'	Attendance: 53,717; Referee: Jesús Gil Manzano (Spain)

21 January 2025 7	Red Star (Serbia)	2–3	(Netherlands) PSV Eindhoven	Red Star Stadium, Belgrade
21:00	Ndiaye 71'; Djiga 77'	Report	De Jong 17', 23'; Flamingo 43'	Attendance: 36,648; Referee: István Kovács (Romania)

29 January 2025 8	Young Boys (Switzerland)	0–1	(Serbia) Red Star	Stadion Wankdorf, Bern
21:00		Report	Kanga 69'	Attendance: 31,500; Referee: Halil Umut Meler (Turkey)

== Statistics ==
=== Goal scorers ===
As of match played 25 May 2025

Rank	No.	Pos.	Player	Serbian SuperLiga	Serbian Cup	Champions League	Total
1	9	FW	(Senegal) Cherif Ndiaye	19	1	2	22
2	17	FW	(Brazil) Bruno Duarte	16	3	1	20
3	10	MF	(Serbia) Aleksandar Katai	13	6	0	19
4	32	MF	(Serbia) Luka Ilić	12	2	0	14
5	4	MF	(Montenegro) Mirko Ivanić	11	1	1	13
6	49	MF	(Serbia) Nemanja Radonjić	5	1	3	9
7	7	MF	(Angola) Felício Milson	5	1	2	8
8	13	MF	(Democratic Republic of the Congo) Silas	5	0	2	7
9	21	MF	(Slovenia) Timi Max Elšnik	4	2	0	6
9	55	MF	(Serbia) Andrija Maksimović	4	2	0	6
9	66	DF	(South Korea) Seol Young-woo	6	0	0	6
12	6	MF	(Bosnia and Herzegovina) Rade Krunić	3	0	1	4
13	24	DF	(Burkina Faso) Nasser Djiga	2	0	1	3
14	5	DF	(Serbia) Uroš Spajić	1	0	1	2
14	7	MF	(Serbia) Jovan Šljivić	2	0	0	2
14	8	MF	(Gabon) Guélor Kanga	1	0	1	2
14	23	DF	(Serbia) Milan Rodić	2	0	0	2
14	14	FW	(Nigeria) Peter Olayinka	2	0	0	2
14	19	FW	(Serbia) Uroš Sremčević	0	2	0	2
20	70	DF	(Serbia) Ognjen Mimović	0	0	1	1
20	88	DF	(Ghana) Ebenezer Annan	1	0	0	1
Totals				123	21	16	160
