= 2024–25 FK Železničar Pančevo season =

FK Železničar Pančevo
2024–25 season
- Serbian SuperLiga: Pre-season
- Serbian Cup: Pre-season

The 2024–25 season is the 78th season in the history of FK Železničar Pančevo, and the club's fourth consecutive season in Serbian SuperLiga. In addition to the domestic league, the team is scheduled to participate in the Serbian Cup and the UEFA Conference League.

== Squad ==
As of 20 June 2024

Note: Flags indicate national team as defined under FIFA eligibility rules; some limited exceptions apply. Players may hold more than one non-FIFA nationality.

No.	Pos.	Nation	Player
1	GK	SRB	Aleksandar Stanković
2	DF	SEN	Maissa Ndiaye (on loan from Cremonese)
3	DF	SRB	Marko Konatar
5	DF	MNE	Mirko Milikić
6	DF	SRB	Vojislav Stanković
9	FW	SRB	Lazar Romanić
13	MF	SRB	Branislav Knežević
15	MF	SRB	Aleksandar Kovačević
16	MF	GAM	Sulayman Marreh
20	DF	SRB	Despot Obrenović
22	MF	SRB	Dario Grgić
23	MF	ARG	Augusto Max
25	GK	SRB	Ognjen Lukić
26	DF	SRB	Bojan Balaž

No.	Pos.	Nation	Player
33	DF	SRB	Ivan Lakićević
35	MF	SRB	Dušan Pantelić
46	DF	SRB	Veljko Mirosavić (on loan from Čukarički)
48	FW	SRB	Veljko Trifunović
55	DF	SRB	Marko Gajić
63	DF	SRB	Stefan Obradović
77	MF	SRB	Stefan Purtić
90	FW	SRB	Strahinja Jovanović
91	FW	UKR	Evgeniy Pavlov
—	GK	SRB	Zoran Popović
—	DF	GHA	Abdul Yusif
—	FW	NGR	Francis Ezeh
—	MF	CIV	Sékou Sanogo

== Competitions ==
=== Overall record ===
Competition	First match	Last match	Starting round	Record							
Competition	First match	Last match	Starting round	Pld	W	D	L	GF	GA	GD	Win %
Serbian SuperLiga	19 July 2024		Matchday 1	1	1	0	0	3	2	+1	100.00
Serbian Cup				0	0	0	0	0	0	+0	—
Total				1	1	0	0	3	2	+1	100.00

Last updated: 19 July 2024
Source: Soccerway

=== Serbian SuperLiga ===
==== Results summary ====
Overall								Home						Away					
Pld	W	D	L	GF	GA	GD	Pts	W	D	L	GF	GA	GD	W	D	L	GF	GA	GD
1	1	0	0	3	2	+1	3	0	0	0	0	0	0	1	0	0	3	2	+1

Last updated: 19 July 2024.

==== Results by round ====
Round	1
Ground	A
Result	W
Position	

Updated to match(es) played on 19 July 2024. Source:
A = Away; H = Home; W = Win; D = Draw; L = Loss

==== Matches ====
The match schedule was released on 10 June 2024.

19 July 2024 1	Radnički 1923	2–3	Železničar Pančevo	Leskovac
19:00 UTC+2	Jovanović 29' (o.g.); Mitrović 53' (o.g.)		Knežević 3'; Grgić 15'; Romanić 45+3'	Stadium: Lazar Romanić; Referee: Milan Mitić
