= Luka Drobnjak =

Serbian footballer

Personal information
- Date of birth: 25 April 2004 (age 22)
- Place of birth: Novi Sad, Serbia and Montenegro
- Height: 1.81 m (5 ft 11 in)
- Position: Centre-back

Team information
- Current team: Napredak Kruševac
- Number: 77

Youth career
- –2022: Vojvodina

Senior career*
Years	Team	Apps	(Gls)
2022–2025	Vojvodina	3	(0)
2023	→ Kabel (loan)	11	(1)
2023–2025	→ Mladost GAT (loan)	51	(0)
2025–	Napredak Kruševac	26	(0)

International career^{‡}
2020	Serbia U17	2	(0)
- * Club domestic league appearances and goals as of 13 June 2026 ‡ National team caps and goals as of 22 August 2024

Luka Drobnjak (Serbian Cyrillic: Лука Дробњак; born 25 April 2004) is a Serbian professional footballer who plays as a defender for Serbian SuperLiga club Napredak Kruševac.

== Club career ==
=== Vojvodina ===
In March 2021, Drobnjak signed his first professional contract with Vojvodina. On 21 July 2024, Drobnjak made his first-team debut, playing full 90 minutes in 3:1 away win at Tekstilac Odžaci.

== Career statistics ==
As of 17 May 2025

Club	Season	League			Cup		Continental		Total	
Club	Season	Division	Apps	Goals	Apps	Goals	Apps	Goals	Apps	Goals
Vojvodina	2021–22	Serbian SuperLiga	0	0	0	0	—		0	0
Vojvodina	2024–25	Serbian SuperLiga	3	0	0	0	0	0	3	0
Vojvodina	Total		3	0	0	0	0	0	3	0
Kabel (loan)	2022–23	Serbian League Vojvodina	11	1	—		—		11	1
Mladost GAT (loan)	2023–24	Serbian First League	23	0	2	0	—		25	0
Mladost GAT (loan)	2024–25	Serbian First League	28	0	1	0	—		29	0
Mladost GAT (loan)	Total		51	0	3	0	0	0	54	0
Napredak Kruševac	2025–26	Serbian SuperLiga	0	0	0	0	—		0	0
Career total			65	1	3	0	0	0	68	1
