= Bamidele Yusuf =

Nigerian footballer (born 2001)

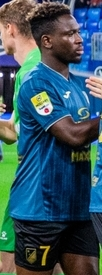
- Yusuf with Vojvodina in 2024

Personal information
- Full name: Bamidele Isa Yusuf
- Date of birth: 22 February 2001 (age 25)
- Place of birth: Jos, Nigeria
- Height: 1.80 m (5 ft 11 in)
- Positions: Winger; forward

Team information
- Current team: Ferencváros
- Number: 11

Youth career
- –2019: FC Obazz

Senior career*
Years	Team	Apps	(Gls)
2019–2022	Spartak Trnava	77	(15)
2022–2024	Estoril	5	(1)
2024	Radnički Niš	16	(6)
2024–2025	Vojvodina	39	(18)
2025–	Ferencváros	31	(6)
- * Club domestic league appearances and goals as of 26 October 2026

Bamidele Isa Yusuf (born 22 February 2001), also known as Dele, is a Nigerian professional footballer who plays as a winger or forward for Hungarian club Ferencváros.

== Club career ==
=== Spartak Trnava ===
Yusuf was transferred to Slovak side Spartak Trnava in November 2019. He made his Fortuna Liga debut for Trnava on 23 February 2020 at OMS Arena against Senica, coming on as a substitute for Theofanis Tzandaris in the second half of a 0–2 defeat.

=== Estoril ===
On 1 September 2022, Yusuf joined Portuguese side Estoril on a five-year contract. He made his debut on 7 October 2022 against Gil Vicente. On 14 October 2022, he played in a 3–2 Taça de Portugal win over Amora. On 1 December 2022, in a cup match played against Académico Viseu, he was ejected from the game with a red card in the 74th minute. On 31 January 2024, Yusuf's contract with Estoril was terminated by mutual agreement.

=== Radnički Niš ===
On 9 February 2024, Bamidele joined Serbian SuperLiga club Radnički Niš.

=== Vojvodina ===
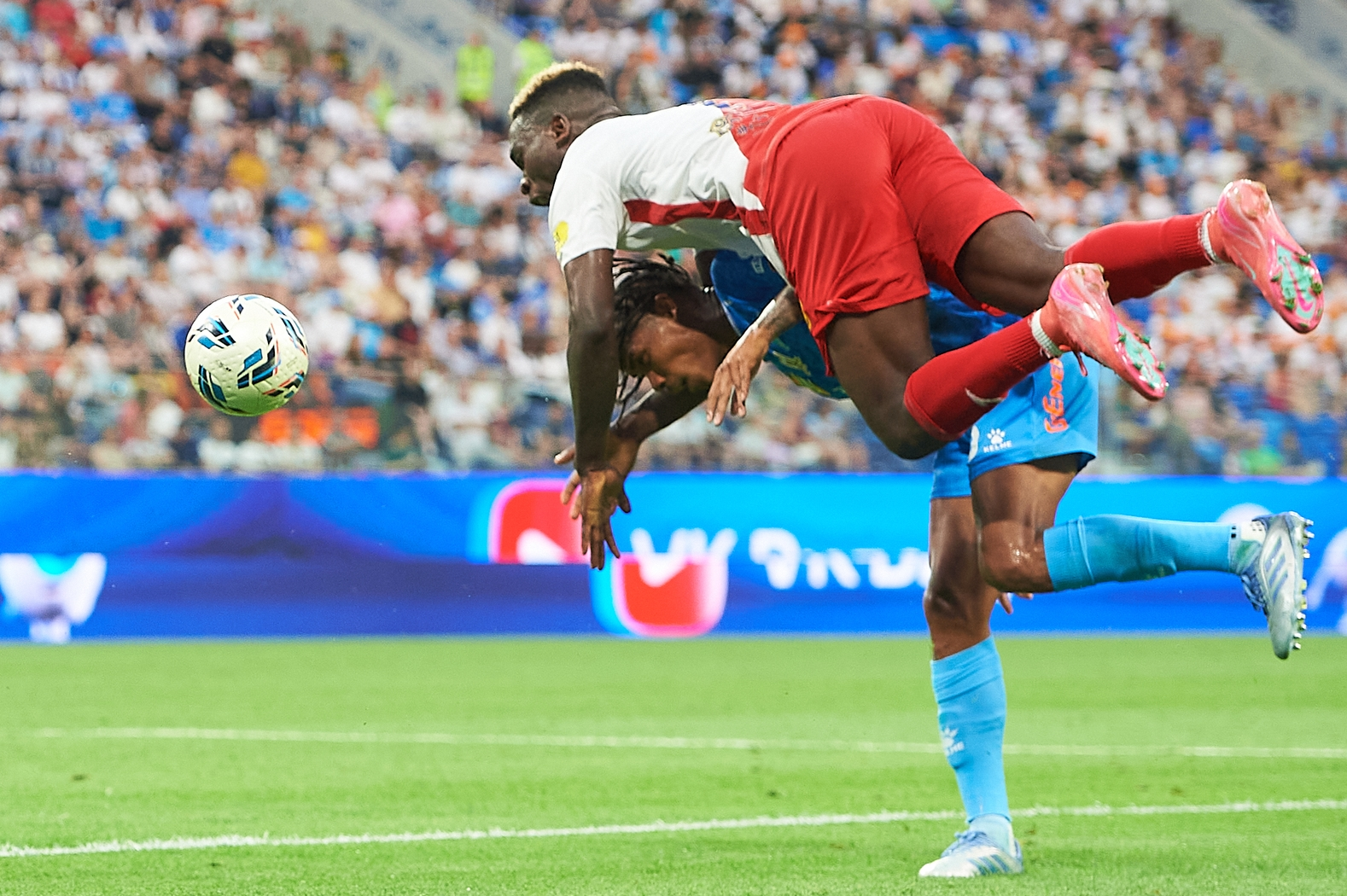
Bamidele in action for Vojvodina in 2025.

After fruitful half-season in Radnički, where he amassed 6 goals and 5 assists in just 15 appearances, Bamidele joined another Serbian SuperLiga outfit, Vojvodina, on a three-year deal.

=== Ferencváros ===
On 31 August 2025, he was signed by Nemzeti Bajnokság I club Ferencvárosi TC. On 22 January 2026, he scored a goal against Panathinaikos F.C. in the 2025–26 UEFA Europa League league phase. The match ended with a 1–1 draw. He scored the only Hungarian goal in a 2–1 defeat from PFC Ludogorets Razgrad in the 2025–26 UEFA Europa League knockout phase on 19 February 2026. On 9 May 2026, he won the 2025–26 Magyar Kupa season with Ferencváros by beating Zalaegerszegi TE 1–0 in the 2026 Magyar Kupa final at Puskás Aréna.

== Career statistics ==
As of match played 23 August 2025

Appearances and goals by club, season and competition
Club	Season	League			National cup (Note: Includes Slovak Cup, Taça de Portugal, Serbian Cup)		League cup (Note: Includes Taça da Liga)		Continental		Total	
Club	Season	Division	Apps	Goals	Apps	Goals	Apps	Goals	Apps	Goals	Apps	Goals
Spartak Trnava	2019–20	Slovak First Football League	9	1	0	0	—		—		9	1
Spartak Trnava	2020–21	Slovak First Football League	29	9	3	2	—		—		32	11
Spartak Trnava	2021–22	Slovak First Football League	31	3	8	2	—		6 (Note: Appearances in UEFA Europa Conference League)	1	45	6
Spartak Trnava	2022–23	Slovak First Football League	8	2	1	0	—		3	3	12	5
Spartak Trnava	Total		77	15	12	4	—		9	4	98	23
Estoril	2022–23	Primeira Liga	5	1	1	0	2	0	—		8	1
Estoril	2023–24	Primeira Liga	0	0	0	0	1	0	—		1	0
Estoril	Total		5	1	1	0	3	0	—		9	1
Radnički Niš	2023–24	Serbian SuperLiga	16	6	0	0	—		—		16	6
Vojvodina	2024–25	Serbian SuperLiga	34	15	3	3	—		4 (Note: Two appearances in UEFA Europa League, two appearances in UEFA Conference League)	0	41	18
Vojvodina	2025–26	Serbian SuperLiga	5	3	0	0	—		—		5	3
Vojvodina	Total		39	18	3	3	—		4	0	46	21
Career total			137	40	16	7	3	0	13	4	168	51

== Honours ==
Spartak Trnava

- Slovak Cup: 2021–22

Ferencváros

- Hungarian Cup: 2025–26

Individual

- Slovak First Football League U21 Team of the Season: 2021–22
- Serbian SuperLiga Player of the Week: 2024–25 (Round 5, Round 17)
