= Dragan Rosić =

Serbian footballer

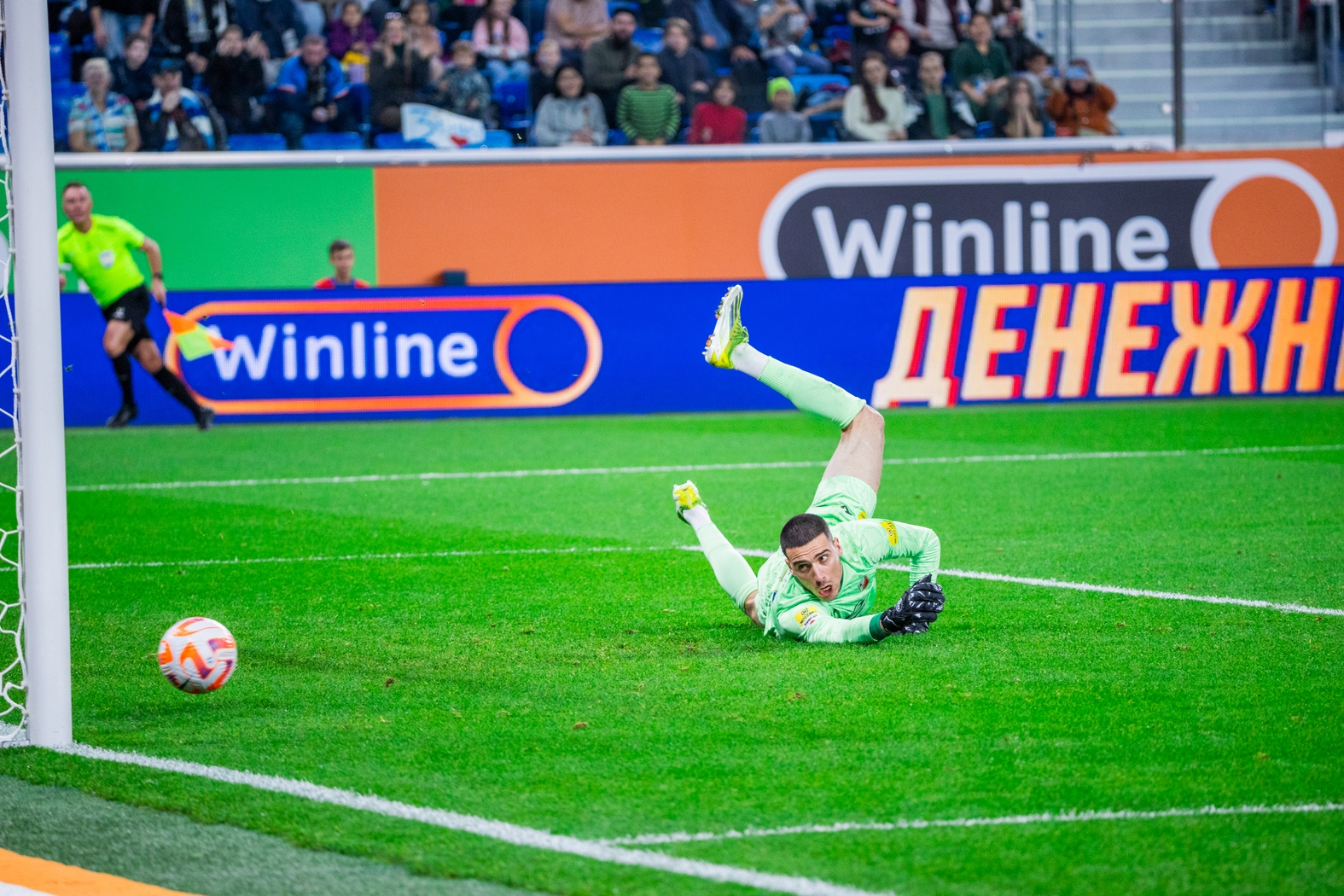
- Rosić in 2024

Personal information
- Date of birth: 22 September 1996 (age 30)
- Place of birth: Užice, FR Yugoslavia
- Height: 1.89 m (6 ft 2 in)
- Position: Goalkeeper

Team information
- Current team: Vojvodina
- Number: 12

Youth career
- Jedinstvo Užice

Senior career*
Years	Team	Apps	(Gls)
2014–2016	Jedinstvo Užice	9	(0)
2016–2019	Mladost Lučani	71	(0)
2017	→ Kolubara (loan)	5	(0)
2019–2022	Almería	0	(0)
2020	→ Celta B (loan)	9	(0)
2020–2021	→ Fuenlabrada (loan)	10	(0)
2021–2022	→ Albacete (loan)	14	(0)
2022–2024	Radnički Niš	36	(0)
2024–	Vojvodina	74	(0)

International career^{‡}
2017	Serbia U20	2	(0)
2018–2019	Serbia U21	3	(0)
2023–	Serbia	1	(0)
- * Club domestic league appearances and goals as of 22 November 2026 ‡ National team caps and goals as of 26 January 2023

Dragan Rosić (Serbian Cyrillic: Драган Росић; born 15 November 1996) is a Serbian professional footballer who plays as a goalkeeper for Serbian SuperLiga club Vojvodina and the Serbia national team.

== Club career ==
=== Jedinstvo Putevi ===
Born in Užice, Rosić started his career with local football club Jedinstvo Putevi. During the 2014–15 Serbian First League season he was used several times as a reserve goalkeeper in the first team squad. After the club relegated in the Serbian League West, Rosić started the 2015–16 as a first choice goalkeeper, but due to injury he earned in the 10 fixture match, against Šumadija 1903 when he was substituted out, he missed the rest of season. He collected 9 league caps as a bonus player and a cup appearance against Zemun.

=== Mladost Lučani ===
After a trial period he passed with the club, Rosić signed a three-year scholarship contract with Mladost Lučani in summer 2016. Next the whole first half-season he spent as a back-up for Nemanja Krznarić, Rosić was loaned on dual registration to Kolubara. After he played 5 matches for the club, Rosić returned to Mladost due to Krznarić's injury. He made his debut for Mladost Lučani in 29 fixture of the 2016–17 Serbian SuperLiga season, played on 9 April 2017, when he was nominated for a man of the match against Čukarički. In summer 2017, Rosić signed his first four-year professional contract with Mladost. At the beginning of new season, Rosić stayed on the bench as an unused substitution in second leg of the second qualifying round for the 2017–18 UEFA Europa League, against Inter Baku. Following the game, Mladost had been eliminated from the further competition after 5–0 aggregate for Inter. Later, during the 2017–18 Serbian SuperLiga campaign, Rosić was named for the first choice goalkeeper, collecting 33 matches in both domestic competitions. Beside the 10th place on the final SuperLiga table, Rosić was awarded for a runner-up in the Serbian Cup.

=== Almería ===
On 16 August 2019, Rosić agreed to a five-year contract with Spanish Segunda División club UD Almería. The following 7 January, after making no appearances, he was loaned to RC Celta de Vigo's reserves in Segunda División B, until June.

On 31 August 2020, Rosić was loaned to CF Fuenlabrada in the second division for the season. He spent the year mainly as a backup to Javier Belman, and moved to Albacete Balompié also in a temporary deal on 4 August 2021. On 30 August 2022, his contract with Almería was terminated by mutual consent.

=== Radnički Niš ===
On 5 September 2022, Rosić signed with Radnički Niš.

=== Vojvodina ===
On 13 January 2024, Rosić was transferred to Vojvodina, for a reported fee of €100,000. He signed a three-year deal with the club.

== International career ==
Rosić was called into the Serbia national under-20 football team in 2017 under coach Milan Obradović. He made his debut for the team on 5 June 2017, replacing Miloš Ostojić in last minutes of the friendly game against Israel. Rosić also appeared in a match against Greece, played at the Karađorđe Stadium on 9 June 2017. As a coach of the Serbian under-21 level, Goran Đorović included Marković to the squad for competitive matches against Macedonia and Russia in September 2018.

Rosić made his debut for Serbia national football team on 25 January 2023 in a friendly match against the United States. Serbia won the game 2–1, with him coming on in a second half as a substitute.

== Career statistics ==
=== Club ===
As of 22 November 2026

Appearances and goals by club, season and competition
Club	Season	League			Cup		Continental		Other		Total	
Club	Season	Division	Apps	Goals	Apps	Goals	Apps	Goals	Apps	Goals	Apps	Goals
Jedinstvo Užice	2014–15	Serbian First League	0	0	0	0	—		—		0	0
Jedinstvo Užice	2015–16	Serbian League West	9	0	1 (Note: Including preliminary round match against Zemun)	0	—		—		10	0
Jedinstvo Užice	Total		9	0	1	0	0	0	0	0	10	0
Kolubara (loan)	2016–17	Serbian First League	5	0	—		—		—		5	0
Mladost Lučani	2016–17	Serbian SuperLiga	4	0	0	0	—		—		4	0
Mladost Lučani	2017–18	Serbian SuperLiga	27	0	6	0	0	0	—		33	0
Mladost Lučani	2018–19	Serbian SuperLiga	36	0	4	0	—		—		40	0
Mladost Lučani	2019–20	Serbian SuperLiga	4	0	0	0	—		—		4	0
Mladost Lučani	Total		71	0	10	0	0	0	0	0	81	0
Almería	2019–20	Segunda División	0	0	0	0	—		—		0	0
Almería	2020–21	Segunda División	0	0	0	0	—		—		0	0
Almería	2021–22	Segunda División	0	0	0	0	—		—		0	0
Almería	Total		0	0	0	0	0	0	0	0	0	0
Celta (loan)	2019–20	La Liga	0	0	0	0	—		—		0	0
Celta B (loan)	2019–20	Segunda División B	9	0	0	0	—		—		9	0
Fuenlabrada (loan)	2020–21	Segunda División	10	0	0	0	—		—		10	0
Albacete (loan)	2021–22	Primera División RFEF	14	0	2	0	—		—		16	0
Radnički Niš	2022–23	Serbian SuperLiga	19	0	3	0	—		1	0	23	0
Radnički Niš	2023–24	Serbian SuperLiga	17	0	0	0	—		—		17	0
Radnički Niš	Total		36	0	3	0	0	0	1	0	40	0
Vojvodina	2023–24	Serbian SuperLiga	4	0	0	0	—		—		4	0
Vojvodina	2024–25	Serbian SuperLiga	19	0	5	0	0	0	—		24	0
Vojvodina	2025–26	Serbian SuperLiga	35	0	1	0	—		—		36	0
Vojvodina	2026–27	Serbian SuperLiga	16	0	0	0	4	0	—		20	0
Vojvodina	Total		74	0	6	0	4	0	0	0	84	0
Career total			228	0	21	0	4	0	1	0	254	0

=== International ===
As of 25 January 2023

Appearances and goals by national team and year
National team	Year	Apps	Goals
Serbia	2023	1	0
Total		1	0

== Honours ==
Mladost Lučani

- Serbian Cup runner-up: 2017–18

Vojvodina

- Serbian Cup runner-up: 2024–25
