= Collins Sichenje =

Kenyan footballer (born 2003)

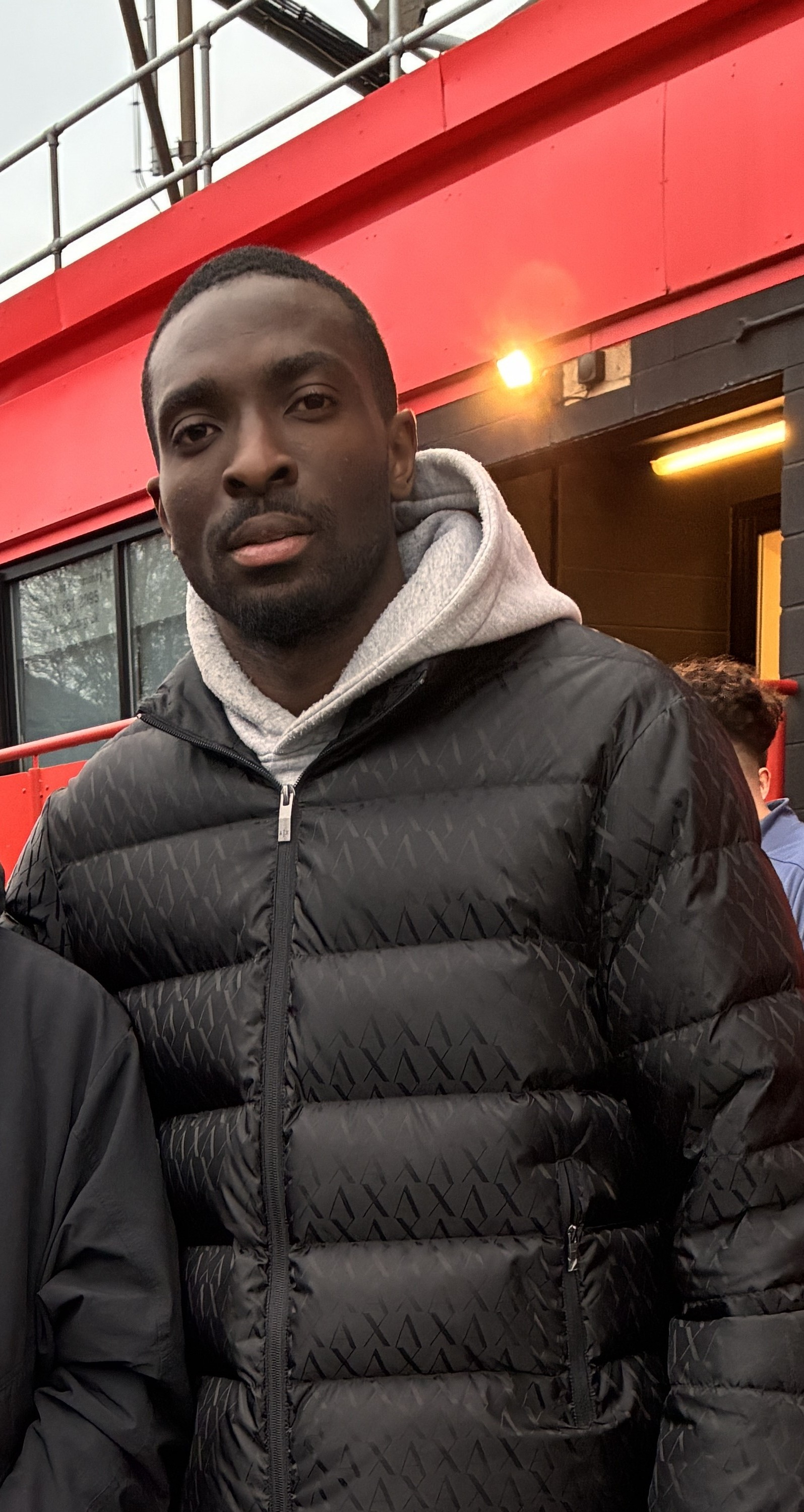
- Sichenje in 2026.

Personal information
- Full name: Collins Lusaka Sichenje
- Date of birth: 19 September 2003 (age 23)
- Place of birth: Butere, Kenya
- Height: 1.89 m (6 ft 2 in)
- Position: Centre-back

Team information
- Current team: Charlton Athletic
- Number: 28

Youth career
- –2019: Green Commandos

Senior career*
Years	Team	Apps	(Gls)
2019–2021	AFC Leopards	1	(0)
2021–2022	PAOK B	0	(0)
2022	AFC Leopards	?	(?)
2022–2024	AIK	8	(0)
2023	→ KuPS (loan)	20	(0)
2024	→ Vojvodina (loan)	3	(0)
2024–2026	Vojvodina	39	(1)
2026–	Charlton Athletic	8	(0)

International career^{‡}
2021–	Kenya	8	(1)
- * Club domestic league appearances and goals as of 17:10, 22 August 2026 (UTC) ‡ National team caps and goals as of 17:10, 2 February 2026 (UTC)

Collins Lusaka Sichenje (born 19 September 2003) is a Kenyan professional footballer who plays as a centre-back for EFL Championship club Charlton Athletic and the Kenya national team.

== Club career ==
=== Early career ===
Sichenje started his career with Green Commandos. After that, he signed for Kenyan Premier League side AFC Leopards in September 2019. In July 2021, he joined B side of Greek team PAOK but failed to settle and returned to his former side without making an appearance. Two months later, he joined Allsvenskan side AIK on a four-year deal. On 7 August 2022, he made his professional league debut starting in a 1–0 defeat to Kalmar. He received interest from teams in Spain.

On 31 March 2023, he joined Veikkausliiga side KuPS on loan for the season. After the season, he returned to AIK as the purchase option was not exercised. Sichenje made 23 appearances for KuPS in total.

=== Vojvodina ===
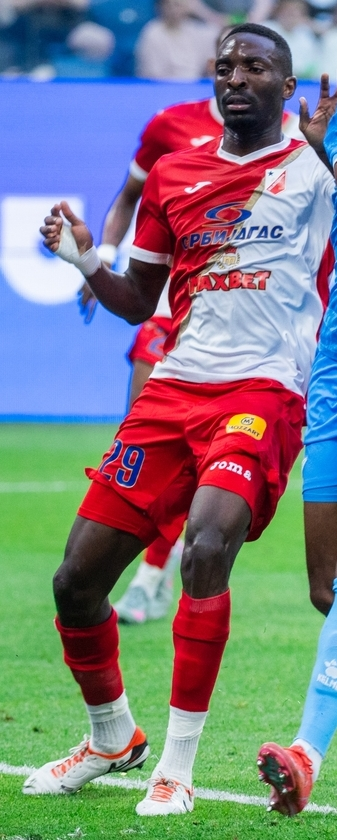
Sichenje playing for Vojvodina in 2025.

On 11 July 2024, Sichenje joined Serbian SuperLiga club Vojvodina on a six-month loan deal, with option to make the loan a permanent transfer. Two months later, after impressing in his first few games for the club, Sichenje's move was made permanent. He signed a three-year deal with the club.

=== Charlton Athletic ===
On 2 February 2026, Sichenje joined Charlton Athletic on a three-and-a-half year deal.

== International career ==
In 2020, he was first called up to the Kenya national team. In March 2021, Sichenje made his debut for Kenya in a 1–0 friendly win over South Sudan.

== Honours ==
KuPS

- Veikkausliiga runner-up: 2023

== Career statistics ==
=== Club ===
As of 26 August 2026

Appearances and goals by club, season and competition
Club	Season	League			National cup (Note: Includes Svenska Cupen, Suomen Cup, Serbian Cup and FA Cup)		League cup (Note: Includes EFL Cup)		Continental		Other		Total	
Club	Season	Division	Apps	Goals	Apps	Goals	Apps	Goals	Apps	Goals	Apps	Goals	Apps	Goals
AFC Leopards	2019–20	Kenyan Premier League	1	0	–		–		–		–		1	0
AFC Leopards	2020–21	Kenyan Premier League	0	0	–		–		–		–		0	0
AFC Leopards	Total		1	0	0	0	0	0	0	0	0	0	1	0
PAOK B	2021–22	Super League 2	0	0	–		–		–		–		0	0
AIK	2022	Allsvenskan	8	0	0	0	–		4 (Note: Includes UEFA Europa Conference League)	0	–		12	0
AIK	2023	Allsvenskan	0	0	0	0	–		–		–		0	0
AIK	2024	Allsvenskan	0	0	0	0	–		–		–		0	0
AIK	Total		8	0	0	0	0	0	4	0	0	0	12	0
KuPS (loan)	2023	Veikkausliiga	20	0	2	0	–		1	0	0	0	23	0
Vojvodina (loan)	2024–25	Serbian SuperLiga	3	0	0	0	–		4 (Note: Appearance(s) in UEFA Europa League)	0	–		7	0
Vojvodina	2024–25	Serbian SuperLiga	22	0	5	0	–		–		–		27	0
Vojvodina	2025–26	Serbian SuperLiga	17	1	1	0	–		–		–		18	1
Vojvodina	Total		42	1	6	0	0	0	4	0	0	0	52	1
Charlton Athletic	2025–26	Championship	6	0	—		–		—		—		6	0
Charlton Athletic	2026–27	Championship	2	0	0	0	2	0	—		—		4	0
Charlton Athletic	Total		8	0	0	0	2	0	0	0	0	0	10	0
Career total			79	1	8	0	2	0	9	0	0	0	98	1

=== International ===
As of match played 14 October 2025

International statistics
National team	Year	Apps	Goals
Kenya	2021	1	0
Kenya	2022	0	0
Kenya	2023	2	0
Kenya	2024	1	0
Kenya	2025	4	1
Total		8	1

Scores and results list Kenya's goal tally first, score column indicates score after each Sichenje goal.

List of international goals scored by Collins Sichenje
No.	Date	Venue	Opponent	Score	Result	Competition
1	9 September 2025	Moi International Sports Centre, Nairobi, Kenya	Seychelles	2–0	5–0	2026 FIFA World Cup qualification
