= Lucas Barros =

Brazilian footballer (born 1999)

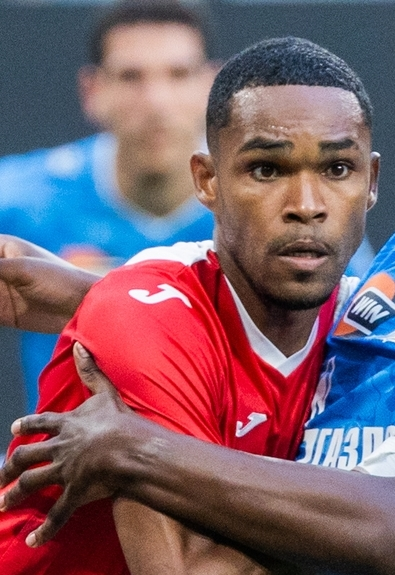

Personal information
- Full name: Lucas Barros da Cunha
- Date of birth: 21 August 1999 (age 27)
- Place of birth: Rio de Janeiro, Brazil
- Height: 1.80 m (5 ft 11 in)
- Position: Left back

Team information
- Current team: Vojvodina
- Number: 23

Youth career
- 2008–2018: Botafogo

Senior career*
Years	Team	Apps	(Gls)
2019–2021	Botafogo	16	(0)
2021–2022	Covilhã	27	(0)
2022–2024	Gil Vicente	0	(0)
2023–2024	→ Tondela (loan)	28	(0)
2024–	Vojvodina	60	(0)
- * Club domestic league appearances and goals as of 22 November 2026

Lucas Barros da Cunha (born 21 August 1999), commonly known as Lucas Barros, is a Brazilian footballer who plays as a left-back for Serbian SuperLiga club Vojvodina.

== Club career ==
Born in Rio de Janeiro, Lucas Barros joined Botafogo's youth setup in 2008, aged nine. On 14 June 2018, he signed a new contract with the club until December of the following year.

Promoted to the first team ahead of the 2019 season, Lucas Barros made his senior debut on 26 January of that year, coming on as a second-half substitute for Jonathan in a 2–1 Campeonato Carioca home loss against Flamengo. He extended his contract until 2022 in March, and made his Série A debut on 12 June, replacing Erik late into a 1–0 home defeat to Grêmio.

On 2 July 2022, Barros signed for Primeira Liga club Gil Vicente.

On 5 July 2023, Gil Vicente sent Barros on a season-long loan to Liga Portugal 2 club Tondela.

In the summer of 2024, Barros signed a three-year contract with Serbian SuperLiga club Vojvodina.
