= Matija Gočmanac =

Serbian footballer (born 2003)

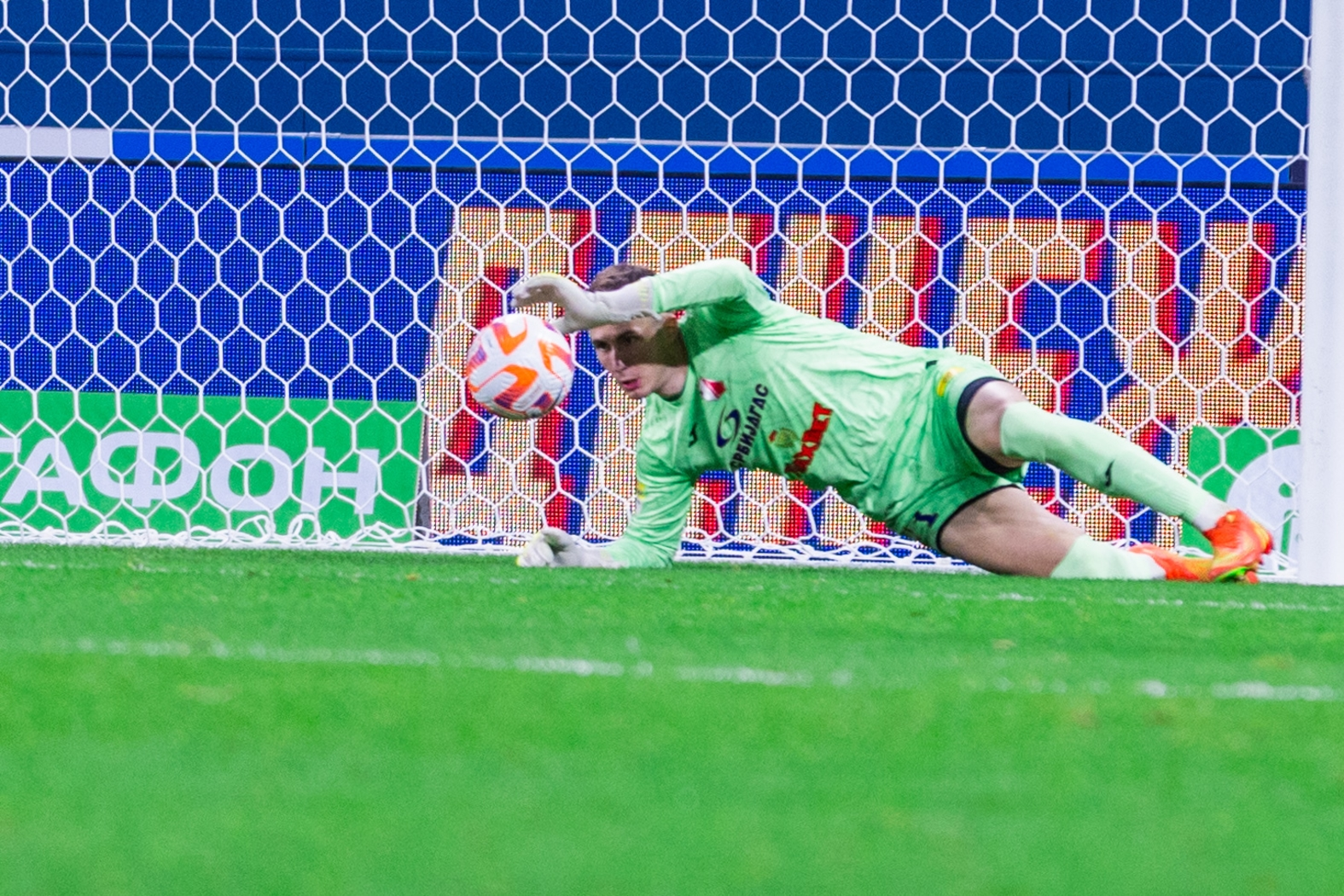
- Gočmanac in 2024

Personal information
- Full name: Matija Gočmanac
- Date of birth: 5 August 2003 (age 23)
- Place of birth: Kruševac, Serbia and Montenegro
- Height: 1.92 m (6 ft 4 in)
- Position: Goalkeeper

Team information
- Current team: Vojvodina
- Number: 1

Youth career
- –2016: Kopaonik Brus
- 2016–2017: OFK Beograd
- 2017–2021: Partizan
- 2018–2019: → Teleoptik (loan)

Senior career*
Years	Team	Apps	(Gls)
2021–2023	Partizan	0	(0)
2021–2023	→ Teleoptik (loan)	48	(0)
2023	Mačva Šabac	18	(0)
2024–	Vojvodina	17	(0)
2024	→ Mačva Šabac (loan)	16	(0)

International career^{‡}
2018	Serbia U15	1	(0)
2018–2019	Serbia U16	3	(0)
2019–2020	Serbia U17	3	(0)
2021–2022	Serbia U19	7	(0)
2022–	Serbia U21	1	(0)
- * Club domestic league appearances and goals as of 12 June 2026 ‡ National team caps and goals as of 27 September 2023

Matija Gočmanac (Serbian Cyrillic: Матија Гочманац; born 5 August 2003) is a Serbian professional footballer who plays as a goalkeeper for Serbian SuperLiga club Vojvodina.

== Club career ==
=== Early career ===
Gočmanac started training at the local Kopaonik Brus. From there, he moved to OFK Beograd, and after spending a year at that club, in the summer of 2017, he joined the youth team of Partizan. After another year, he was transferred to Teleoptik, and later signed a scholarship contract with the club. The following year, he signed a professional contract, and thereafter, he was a regular goalkeeper in the cadet category.

=== Partizan ===
He joined the first team training in early February 2021, and for the first time, he was on the roster for a match against Novi Pazar in the 21st round of the Serbian SuperLiga. By the end of the season, he was on the bench a few more times and regularly played for the youth team. After that, he was loaned to Teleoptik, where he spent two seasons and played in the Serbian League Belgrade. During this time, he occasionally trained with the first team.

=== Mačva Šabac ===
In 2023, he joined Mačva Šabac, signing a one-year contract with an option for an additional season. He became a regular in the team at the start of the 2023–24 season in the Serbian First League.

=== Vojvodina ===
In mid-February 2024, Gočmanac signed a contract with Vojvodina, but according to the agreement, he remained on loan at Mačva until the end of the season. According to Sport Klub, the transfer fee was estimated at five million dinars, with ten percent of the next transfer included. He reported to the coach of the Novi Sad club, Božidar Bandović, at the beginning of preparations for the 2024–25 Serbian SuperLiga season. On 31 July 2025, Gočmanac signed a contract extension with the club until the end of 2029 season.

== International career ==
Gočmanac attended the winter school of the Football Association of Serbia in early 2017. He made his debut for Serbia national under-15 football team in a victory over Hungary in June 2018. He later played for the under-16 national team, and was later included in the squad of the under-17 national team. However, due to the COVID-19 pandemic, the elite round of the UEFA European Under-17 Championship qualifiers and the final tournament were canceled. In June 2021, he played for the under-19 team in a double match against Romania. He then won the Stevan Vilotić Ćele Memorial Tournament with the national team. He was part of the squad at the 2022 UEFA European Under-19 Championship. The coach of the under-21 national team, Goran Stevanović, called him up for friendly matches during the November international window that same year. He made his debut against North Macedonia, replacing Veljko Ilić in the 75th minute of the match.

== Sources ==
- Фудбал, број 35 (PDF). Фудбалски савез Србије. 2017. COBISS 107563532
- Фудбал, ванредни број 20 (PDF). Фудбалски савез Србије. 2018.
- Фудбал, ванредни број 25 (PDF). Фудбалски савез Србије. 2018.
- Фудбал, број 23 (PDF). Фудбалски савез Србије. 2021.
