= Stefan Bukinac =

Serbian footballer

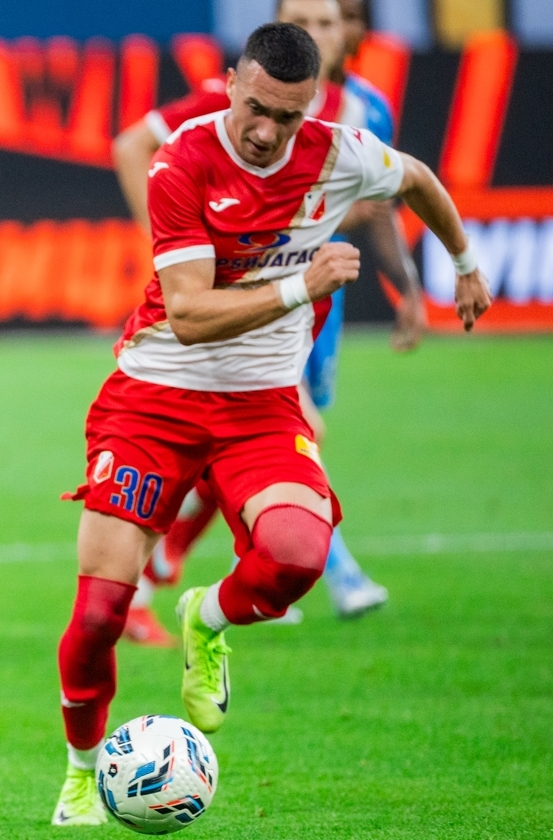
- Stefan Bukinac playing for FK Vojvodina Novi Sad in 2025.

Personal information
- Date of birth: 8 July 2005 (age 21)
- Place of birth: Srbobran, Serbia and Montenegro
- Height: 1.83 m (6 ft 0 in)
- Position: Left-back

Team information
- Current team: Young Boys
- Number: 33

Youth career
- –2023: Vojvodina

Senior career*
Years	Team	Apps	(Gls)
2022–2026	Vojvodina	40	(0)
2026–	Young Boys	22	(0)

International career^{‡}
2021–2022	Serbia U17	10	(0)
2022–	Serbia U18	5	(0)
2023–2024	Serbia U19	11	(0)
2025–	Serbia U21	6	(0)
2026–	Serbia	4	(0)
- * Club domestic league appearances and goals as of 19 September 2026 ‡ National team caps and goals as of 16 November 2026

Stefan Bukinac (Serbian Cyrillic: Стефан Букинац; born 8 July 2005) is a Serbian professional footballer who plays as a defender for Swiss Super League club Young Boys and the Serbia national team.

== Club career ==
=== Vojvodina ===
In October 2022, Bukinac signed his first professional contract with Vojvodina, penning a three-year deal with the club. On 30 July 2023, Bukinac made his first-team debut, playing 72 minutes in a 0:5 away loss to Red Star Belgrade, before being replaced by another first-team debutant Lazar Jovanović.

In September 2023, Bukinac signed a new four-year deal with the club.

=== Young Boys ===
On 1 February 2026 Bukinac signed a four-and-half year deal with Young Boys, in a transfer worth €2,200,000 and 10% of the next sale.

== Career statistics ==
=== Club ===
As of 19 September 2026

Club	Season	League			Cup		Continental		Total	
Club	Season	Division	Apps	Goals	Apps	Goals	Apps	Goals	Apps	Goals
Vojvodina	2022–23	Serbian SuperLiga	0	0	0	0	—		0	0
Vojvodina	2023–24	Serbian SuperLiga	10	0	2	0	0	0	12	0
Vojvodina	2024–25	Serbian SuperLiga	10	0	2	1	0	0	12	1
Vojvodina	2025–26	Serbian SuperLiga	20	0	1	0	—		21	0
Vojvodina	Total		40	0	5	1	0	0	45	1
Young Boys	2025–26	Swiss Super League	14	0	—		—		14	0
Young Boys	2026–27	Swiss Super League	8	0	1	0	—		9	0
Young Boys	Total		22	0	1	0	—		23	0
Career total			62	0	6	1	0	0	68	1

=== International ===
As of match played 16 November 2026

Appearances and goals by national team and year
National team	Year	Apps	Goals
Serbia	2026	4	0
Total		4	0
