= Seid Korać =

Luxembourgish footballer

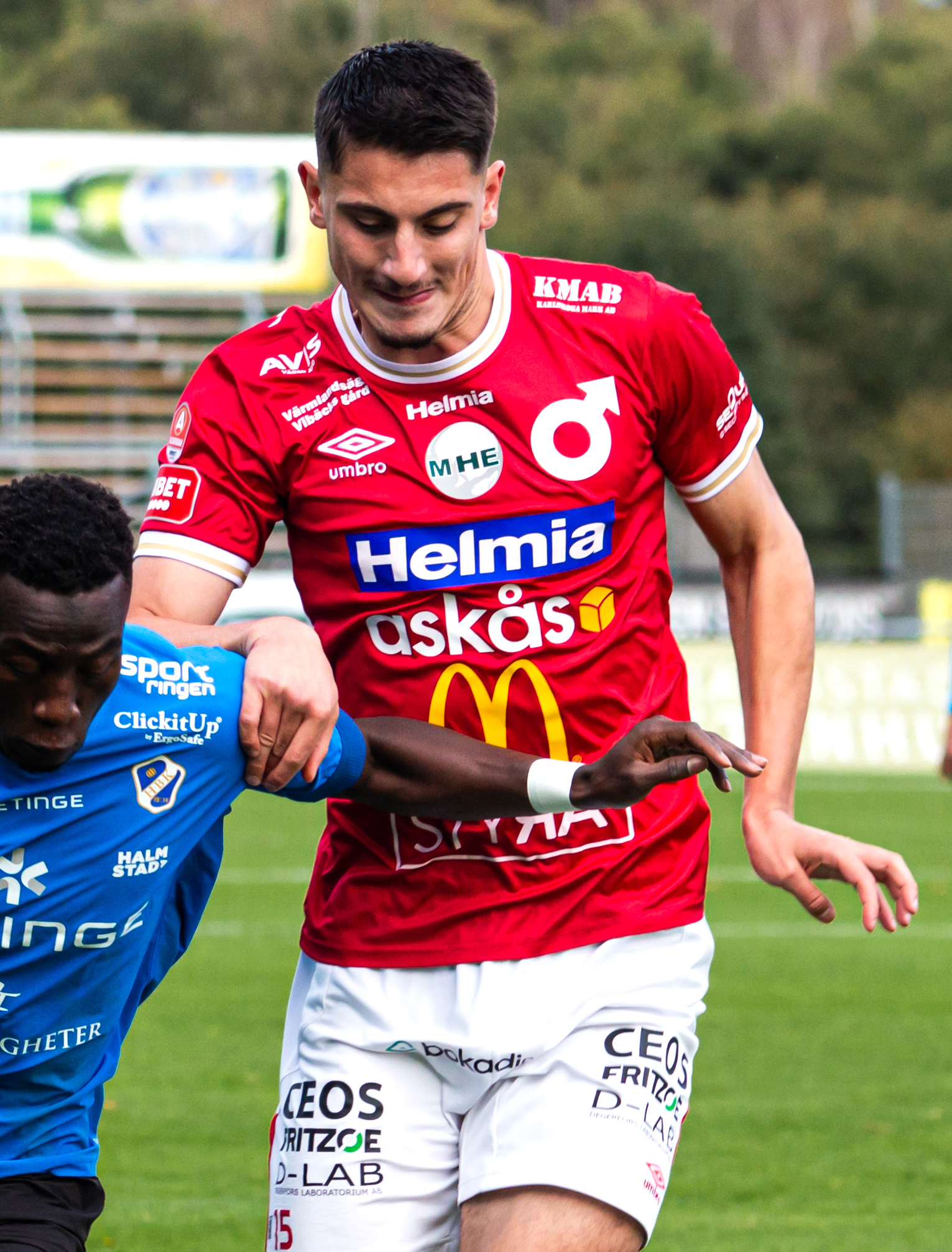

Personal information
- Date of birth: 20 October 2001 (age 25)
- Place of birth: Niederkorn, Luxembourg
- Height: 1.91 m (6 ft 3 in)
- Position: Centre-back

Team information
- Current team: Hellas Verona (on loan from Venezia)
- Number: 48

Youth career
- –2014: CS Oberkorn
- 2014–2017: Rodange 91
- 2019–2020: 1. FC Nürnberg

Senior career*
Years	Team	Apps	(Gls)
2017–2019	Rodange 91	4	(0)
2020–2021	1. FC Nürnberg II	7	(0)
2021–2023	Esbjerg fB	18	(1)
2022	→ Akritas Chlorakas (loan)	13	(0)
2023–2024	Degerfors	25	(1)
2024–2025	Vojvodina	46	(2)
2025–	Venezia	18	(1)
2026–	→ Hellas Verona (loan)	0	(0)

International career^{‡}
2017	Luxembourg U16	6	(0)
2017	Luxembourg U17	8	(0)
2018	Luxembourg U18	2	(0)
2018–2019	Luxembourg U19	7	(0)
2019–2021	Luxembourg U21	8	(1)
2020–	Luxembourg	23	(2)
- * Club domestic league appearances and goals as of 23 August 2026 ‡ National team caps and goals as of 16:00, 6 June 2026 (UTC)

Seid Korać (Serbian Cyrillic: Сеид Кораћ, born 20 October 2001) is a Luxembourgish professional footballer who plays as a centre-back for Serie B club Hellas Verona, on loan from Venezia, and the Luxembourg national team.

== Club career ==
Having started his youth career at CS Oberkorn, Korać joined the Rodange 91 academy in 2014, along with his two older brothers Irfan and Kenan. Integrated into the professional team competing in the Luxembourg National Division from 2017, he contributed to the team avoiding relegation in the 2017–18 season.

Korać left Rodange in January 2019 to join Bundesliga club 1. FC Nürnberg. In Nuremberg, Korać quickly distinguished himself with the youth teams, scoring a goal in his first appearance with the U19s. The following season, he joined the club's reserve team, playing in the Regionalliga.

On 11 August 2021, Korać joined Danish 1st Division club Esbjerg fB on a deal until June 2024. On 24 August 2022, Korać was loaned out to newly promoted Cypriot First Division side Akritas Chlorakas until the end of 2022. In the beginning of January 2023, Korać left Esbjerg and joined Allsvenskan club Degerfors IF, signing a deal until the end of 2025.

On 31 January 2024, Korać signed for Serbian SuperLiga club Vojvodina.

On 10 July 2025, Korać joined Serie B side Venezia on a permanent transfer, signing a four-year contract.

== International career ==
Korać made his international debut for Luxembourg on 11 November 2020 in a friendly match against Austria.

== Personal life ==
Korać is of Serbian Bosniak descent, and holds a Serbian passport.

== Career statistics ==
=== Club ===
As of 21 November 2025

Appearances and goals by club, season and competition
Club	Season	League			National cup		Continental (Note: Appearance in UEFA Europa League)		Other (Note: Appearance in DFL-Ligapokal)		Total	
Club	Season	Division	Apps	Goals	Apps	Goals	Apps	Goals	Apps	Goals	Apps	Goals
Rodange	2017–18	Luxembourg National Division	2	0	1	0	—		—		3	0
Rodange	2018–19	Luxembourg National Division	3	0	1	0	—		—		4	0
Rodange	Total		5	0	2	0	—		—		7	0
Nürnberg U-19	2018–19	U-19 Bundesliga	10	1	—		—		—		10	1
Nürnberg II	2020–21	Regionalliga Bayern	2	0	—		—		1	0	3	0
Nürnberg II	2021–22	Regionalliga Bayern	5	0	—		—		—		5	0
Nürnberg II	Total		7	0	—		—		1	0	8	0
Esbjerg	2021–22	Danish 1st Division	18	1	1	0	—		—		19	1
Akritas Chlorakas (loan)	2022–23	Cypriot First Division	15	0	2	0	—		—		17	0
Degerfors	2023	Allsvenskan	25	1	3	0	—		—		28	1
Vojvodina	2023–24	Serbian Superiga	16	1	3	1	—		—		19	2
Vojvodina	2024–25	Serbian Superiga	30	1	4	1	1	0	—		35	2
Vojvodina	Total		46	2	7	2	1	0	—		54	4
Venezia	2025–26	Italian Serie B	9	1	1	0	—		—		10	1
Career total			135	6	16	2	1	0	1	0	153	8

=== International ===
As of match played 6 June 2026

Luxembourg
Year	Apps	Goals
2020	1	0
2021	0	0
2022	0	0
2023	3	0
2024	6	1
2025	9	1
2026	4	0
Total	23	2

Scores and results list Luxembourg's goal tally first.

List of international goals scored by Seid Korać
No.	Date	Venue	Opponent	Score	Result	Competition
1.	18 November 2024	Stade de Luxembourg, Luxembourg City, Luxembourg	Northern Ireland	1–2	2–2	2024–25 UEFA Nations League C
2.	22 March 2025	Stade de Luxembourg, Luxembourg City, Luxembourg	Sweden	1–0	1–0	Friendly
