= Caleb Zady Sery =

Ivorian association football player

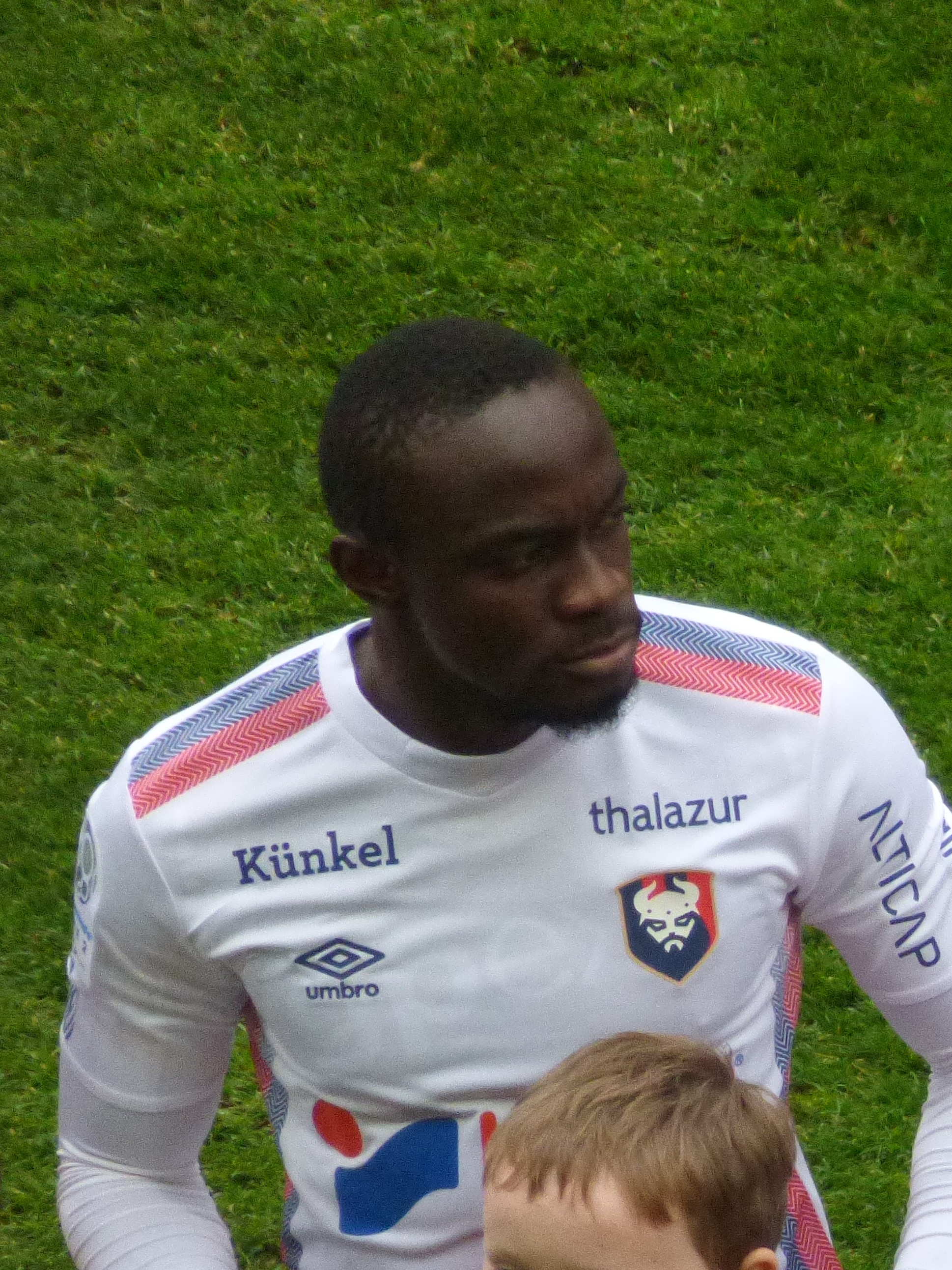
- Zady Sery with Caen in 2020

Personal information
- Date of birth: 20 December 1999 (age 26)
- Place of birth: Gagnoa, Ivory Coast
- Height: 1.77 m (5 ft 10 in)
- Position: Attacking midfielder

Team information
- Current team: Molde
- Number: 11

Youth career
- 2017–2018: Ajaccio

Senior career*
Years	Team	Apps	(Gls)
2017–2019	Ajaccio	25	(1)
2017–2019	→ Ajaccio B	11	(2)
2019–2024	Caen	96	(2)
2020–2024	→ Caen B	12	(6)
2024–2025	Vojvodina	42	(12)
2025–	Molde	18	(3)
- * Club domestic league appearances and goals as of 1 December 2025

Caleb Zady Sery (born 20 December 1999) is an Ivorian professional footballer who plays as an attacking midfielder for Eliteserien club Molde.

== Club career ==
=== Ajaccio ===
Zady Sery made his professional debut for Ajaccio in a 0–0 league draw against Paris FC on 14 September 2018.

=== Caen ===
On 31 August 2019, Zady Sery signed for Caen on a five-year contract.

=== Vojvodina ===
On 10 February 2024, Zady Sery signed a 3 1/2-year contract with Vojvodina in Serbia.

=== Molde ===
On 24 March 2025, Zady Sery signed a 3 1/2-year contract with Norwegian club Molde.

== Honours ==
Individual

- Serbian SuperLiga Player of the Week: 2024–25 (Round 11)
