= Marko Šarić =

Serbian footballer

Personal information
- Date of birth: 28 November 1998 (age 27)
- Place of birth: Zemun, FR Yugoslavia
- Height: 1.88 m (6 ft 2 in)
- Position: Forward

Youth career
- Čukarički

Senior career*
Years	Team	Apps	(Gls)
2017–2021	Čukarički	20	(2)
2018	→ IMT (loan)	13	(8)
2020	→ Radnički Pirot (loan)	7	(1)
2021	→ Rad (loan)	18	(5)
2021	Metalac Gornji Milanovac	19	(3)
2022	Neftchi Fergana	8	(0)
2022–2023	Napredak Kruševac	35	(5)
2023	Qingdao Hainiu	9	(2)
2024	Javor Ivanjica	17	(1)
2024–2026	Napredak Kruševac	39	(9)
2026	Muangthong United	13	(2)
2026–	FK Zemun	6	(0)
- * Club domestic league appearances and goals as of 02:26, 15 September 2026 (UTC)

Marko Šarić (Serbian Cyrillic: Марко Шарић; born 28 November 1998) is a Serbian footballer who plays as Forward.

== Career ==
He made his Serbian SuperLiga debut for FK Čukarički on 31 March 2017 in a game against Metalac.

On 17 January 2020, Šarić joined Serbian First League club FK Radnički Pirot on loan for the rest of the season. He made seven appearances for the club and scored one goal, before returning to FK Čukarički where he was handed shirt number 11.

On 1 August 2023, Šarić signed with Chinese Super League club Qingdao Hainiu.

On 22 February 2024, Šarić returned to his home country to join Javor Ivanjica.

== Career statistics ==
As of match played 22 March 2026

Appearances and goals by club, season and competition
Club	Season	League			Cup		Continental		Other		Total	
Club	Season	Division	Apps	Goals	Apps	Goals	Apps	Goals	Apps	Goals	Apps	Goals
Čukarički	2016–17	Serbian SuperLiga	5	0	0	0	—		—		5	0
Čukarički	2018–19	Serbian SuperLiga	8	1	2	0	—		—		10	1
Čukarički	2020–21	Serbian SuperLiga	7	1	1	0	—		—		8	1
Čukarički	Total		20	2	3	0	—		—		23	2
IMT (loan)	2017–18	Serbian League Belgrade	13	8	0	0	—		—		13	8
Radnički Pirot (loan)	2019–20	Serbian First League	7	1	—		—		—		7	1
Rad (loan)	2020–21	Serbian SuperLiga	18	5	—		—		—		18	5
Metalac Gornji Milanovac	2021–22	Serbian SuperLiga	19	3	1	0	—		—		20	3
Neftchi Fergana	2022	Uzbekistan Super League	8	0	1	0	—		—		9	0
Napredak Kruševac	2022–23	Serbian SuperLiga	35	5	3	1	—		—		38	6
Qingdao Hainiu	2023	Chinese Super League	9	2	2	2	—		—		11	4
Javor Ivanjica	2023–24	Serbian SuperLiga	15	1	—		—		2	0	17	1
Napredak Kruševac	2024–25	Serbian SuperLiga	28	7	3	1	—		—		31	8
Napredak Kruševac	2025–26	Serbian SuperLiga	11	2	1	0	—		—		12	2
Napredak Kruševac	Total		39	9	4	1	—		—		43	10
Muangthong United	2025–26	Thai League 1	9	2	1	0	—		—		10	2
Career total			194	38	15	4	0	0	2	0	209	44
