= Lazar Romanić =

Serbian footballer

Personal information
- Full name: Lazar Romanić
- Date of birth: 25 March 1998 (age 28)
- Place of birth: Kragujevac, FR Yugoslavia
- Height: 1.83 m (6 ft 0 in)
- Position: Winger

Team information
- Current team: Kawasaki Frontale
- Number: 9

Youth career
- Obrenovac 1905
- Omladinac NB
- Red Star Belgrade

Senior career*
Years	Team	Apps	(Gls)
2017–2018	Red Star Belgrade	0	(0)
2017	→ OFK Beograd (loan)	6	(1)
2017–2018	→ Borac Čačak (loan)	18	(0)
2018–2023	Lamia	105	(6)
2023–2025	Železničar Pančevo	56	(19)
2025	Vojvodina	17	(5)
2025–	Kawasaki Frontale	27	(4)

International career
2015–2016	Serbia U18		
2016–2017	Serbia U19	5	(1)
- * Club domestic league appearances and goals as of 6 June 2026

Lazar Romanić (Serbian Cyrillic: Лазар Романић; born 25 March 1998) is a Serbian professional footballer who plays as a winger for J1 League club Kawasaki Frontale.

== Club career ==
=== Red Star Belgrade ===
Born in Kragujevac to Croatian Serb parents who fled Knin, Croatia during Operation Storm, Romanić is a product of Red Star Belgrade youth system. After remarkable games in youth team, he signed his first three-year professional contract with the club on 27 October 2016. At the end of the year, Romanić was nominated for the best youth player in the club academy. He has also been called into the first team, passing the winter break-off season with senior members. For the rest of season, Romanić was loaned to the Serbian First League side OFK Beograd, but also stayed playing with youth team on dual registration. Romanić scored his first senior goal on 9 April 2017 in the 21 fixture match of 2016–17 between Budućnost Dobanovci and OFK Beograd. Although he was Italian side Carpi in summer 2017, Romanić moved at one-year loan deal to Borac Čačak.

=== Lamia ===
On 30 August 2018, Romanić moved to Lamia as a free agent from Red Star Belgrade, which kept a resale rate of 30%.

=== Železničar Pančevo ===
After 5 seasons in Lamia, on 22 June 2023, Romanić returned to Serbia, signing for Železničar Pančevo as part of club's reinforcements for the maiden top flight season.

=== Vojvodina ===
On 11 January 2025, Romanić signed for another Serbian SuperLiga club, Vojvodina for a reported transfer fee of €500,000.

== International career ==
Romanić got a first call into the Serbia U18 level in October 2015 under coach Ivan Tomić. He his debut for Serbia national under-19 football team on 1 September 2016 in a match against the United States, played on the memorial tournament "Stevan Vilotić - Ćele". Romanić scored his first goal for the team in a friendly match against Bulgaria on 23 February 2017.

== Career statistics ==
=== Club ===
As of 25 May 2025

Appearances and goals by club, season and competition
Club	Season	League			Cup		Continental		Other		Total	
Club	Season	Division	Apps	Goals	Apps	Goals	Apps	Goals	Apps	Goals	Apps	Goals
Red Star Belgrade	2016–17	Serbian SuperLiga	0	0	0	0	—		—		0	0
Red Star Belgrade	2017–18	Serbian SuperLiga	0	0	0	0	—		—		0	0
Red Star Belgrade	Total		0	0	0	0	—		—		0	0
OFK Beograd (loan)	2016–17	Serbian First League	6	1	—		—		—		6	1
Borac Čačak (loan)	2017–18	Serbian SuperLiga	18	0	0	0	—		—		18	0
Lamia	2018–19	Super League Greece	7	0	5	1	—		—		12	1
Lamia	2019–20	Super League Greece	32	1	4	2	—		—		36	3
Lamia	2020–21	Super League Greece	28	4	2	0	—		—		30	4
Lamia	2021–22	Super League Greece	26	1	6	1	—		—		32	2
Lamia	2022–23	Super League Greece	12	0	2	0	—		—		14	0
Lamia	Total		105	6	19	4	0	0	0	0	124	10
Železničar Pančevo	2023–24	Serbian SuperLiga	37	10	1	0	—		—		38	10
Železničar Pančevo	2024–25	Serbian SuperLiga	19	9	0	0	—		—		19	9
Železničar Pančevo	Total		56	19	1	0	0	0	0	0	57	19
Vojvodina	2024–25	Serbian SuperLiga	17	5	3	0	—		—		20	5
Kawasaki Frontale	2025	J1 League	0	0	0	0	—		—		0	0
Career Total			202	31	23	4	—		—		225	35
