= Kraljevica Stadium =

Football Stadium in Zaječar, Serbia

Stadium Kraljevica
- Стадион Краљевица / Stadion Kraljevica
- Interactive map of Stadium Kraljevica
- Address: September 7, 19000 Zaječar, Serbia; Zaječar; Serbia
- Coordinates: 43.893695°N 22.265164°E
- Owner: City of Zaječar
- Operator: FSS Stadiums D.O.O.
- Capacity: 8,168
- Surface: Hybrid grass
- Scoreboard: LED
- Field size: 105 × 68 metres

Construction
- Groundbreaking: 29 December 2020
- Built: 2020–2023
- Opened: 19 November 2023
- Cost: €28.8 million (2020)
- Architect: Centar za planiranje urbanog razvoja (CEP) d.o.o. Sintezis inženjering
- Project manager: Pro-Ing d.o.o.
- Main contractors: Termomont d.o.o. Teming Electrotechnology d.o.o. MPP Jedinstvo; Geourb d.o.o. Others

Tenants
- FK Timok (2025–present); OFK Beograd (2024–2026)

Kraljevica Stadium (Serbian: Стадион Краљевица / Stadion Kraljevica) is a football stadium in Zaječar, Serbia, in the district of the same name, in eastern Serbia. Since 2023, the football club FK Timok has played its home games at the football stadium of the Kraljevica sports complex. The covered stands have 8,168 seats. The facility meets the requirements of UEFA stadium categories 4.

== History ==
Zaječar City Stadium, also known as Stadium near Kraljevica, has been a central sports venue in Zaječar, Serbia, for many years. Serving as the home ground for FK Timok, the stadium has a seating capacity of 10,000 spectators. Over time, the facility underwent various renovations to maintain its status as a multi-use stadium.

In 2019, coinciding with FK Timok's 100th anniversary, plans were announced for a new football-specific stadium in Zaječar. The construction of the new stadium, named Kraljevica Stadium, was part of a broader government initiative to improve sports infrastructure across Serbia, Other stadiums that benefited from this funding included the Dubočica Stadium in Leskovac and the Lagator Stadium in Loznica. All three venues offer between 8,000 and 8,200 covered seats.

The project was funded through the government's sports infrastructure improvement programme, with a total investment of approximately 3.38 billion Serbian dinars (about €28.8 million). At the end of October 2020, a tender for the construction of the Kraljevica Stadium was launched, which culminated in the award of the contract in December of that year to the A consortium of companies, including WD Concord West and others, was awarded the construction contract, and the design was prepared by Centar za planiranje urbanog razvoja and Sintezis inženjering.

Construction commenced on 29 December 2020, with a groundbreaking ceremony attended by President Aleksandar Vučić, Minister of Youth and Sports Vanja Udovičić, and the Mayor of Zaječar, Boško Ničić. Despite initial plans to complete the stadium by the end of 2022, the project experienced delays and was ultimately completed in November 2023. The grand opening took place on November 19, 2023, with notable figures such as UEFA President Aleksander Čeferin and Serbian Football Association President Dragan Džajić, President of Republika Srpska Milorad Dodik and Mayor of Zaječar Boško Ničić in attendance.

The Kraljevica Stadium is located in the south of the city on the site of the former hippodrome, near the Stadion pod Kraljevicom. This was the home of FK Timok until the new stadium was built. The old venue is still used as an athletics stadium. Plans are underway to install a new athletics facility. The Kraljevica sports complex also includes the Kraljevica municipal sports and recreation center, the Euroclub Zaječar tennis club, and a swimming pool. The new, rectangular stadium has four single-story, covered tiers that extend to the edge of the pitch. Blue and turquoise plastic folding seats are arranged in a Mosaic on the stands. The LED floodlights are distributed over four masts in the corners of the stadium. The two video scoreboards were installed under the white roof in the northwest and southeast corners.

It also has separate entrances for both football teams. The facility is fully covered by video surveillance cameras. Spectators enter through gates, where systems for reading barcodes on tickets are also installed. Special areas have been set up for people with disabilities and their companions. It also offers around 20 food and refreshment stands, as well as facilities for media coverage. The stadium is intended to attract investors to build a hotel. More hotels are to follow, and athletes will arrive as soon as accommodation becomes available. This is intended to promote the development of sport and tourism in Zaječar and the region.

In April 2024, OFK Beograd announced that the club would move to the Kraljevica Stadium in Zaječar for a transitional period starting in the summer. The reason for this is the modernization work at the Omladinski Stadium, which is being prepared for the Serbian SuperLiga. When the Omladinski Stadium got finished in the end of February 2026, OFK Beograd played their last match in the Kraljevica stadium with Železničar Pančevo in February 21. 2026. For now, its not known who is going to play on the stadium. The Kraljevica Stadium, along with the Karađorđe Stadium, Dubočica Stadium and the Lagator Stadium, is planned as one of four Serbian venues for the 2027 UEFA European Under-21 Championship in Serbia and Albania.
