= 2012–13 FK Vojvodina season =

Vojvodina
2012–13 season
- President: Ratko Butorović
- Head coach: Zlatomir Zagorčić (until September 2012); Nebojša Vignjević (from September 2012)
- Serbian SuperLiga: 3rd
- Serbian Cup: Runners-up
- UEFA Europa League: Third qualifying round
- Top goalscorer: League: Aboubakar Oumarou (11); All: Aboubakar Oumarou (17)

The 2012–13 season was FK Vojvodina's 7th season in Serbian SuperLiga. This article shows player statistics and all matches (official and friendly) that the club played during the 2012–13 season.

== Players ==
=== Squad information ===
Note: Flags indicate national team as defined under FIFA eligibility rules; some limited exceptions apply. Players may hold more than one non-FIFA nationality.

No.	Pos.	Nation	Player
1	GK	(Serbia) SRB	Srđan Žakula
2	DF	(Serbia) SRB	Nemanja Radoja
5	DF	(Montenegro) MNE	Igor Vujačić
6	DF	(Serbia) SRB	Branislav Trajković
7	MF	(Serbia) SRB	Enver Alivodić
9	FW	(Serbia) SRB	Đorđe Šušnjar
10	MF	(Bosnia and Herzegovina) BIH	Stojan Vranješ
11	MF	(Serbia) SRB	Mijat Gaćinović
12	GK	(Serbia) SRB	Miloš Čavić
13	MF	(Serbia) SRB	Vuk Mitošević
14	FW	(Cameroon) CMR	Aboubakar Oumarou
15	DF	(Serbia) SRB	Bojan Nastić
17	MF	(Montenegro) MNE	Nebojša Kosović
18	MF	(Serbia) SRB	Marko Poletanović

No.	Pos.	Nation	Player
19	DF	(Serbia) SRB	Stefan Nikolić
20	MF	(Serbia) SRB	Milan Spremo
21	MF	(Serbia) SRB	Miloš Deletić
22	DF	(Serbia) SRB	Miroslav Vulićević (captain)
23	DF	(Serbia) SRB	Igor Đurić
26	MF	(Serbia) SRB	Nemanja Sekulić
27	GK	(Bosnia and Herzegovina) BIH	Nemanja Supić
28	MF	(Nigeria) NGA	Nnaemeka Ajuru
29	MF	(Serbia) SRB	Goran Smiljanić
30	GK	(Montenegro) MNE	Marko Kordić
31	DF	(Serbia) SRB	Vladan Pavlović
33	MF	(Serbia) SRB	Aleksandar Katai
34	FW	(Serbia) SRB	Georgije Ilić
37	DF	(Serbia) SRB	Đorđe Jokić

=== Squad statistics ===
No.	Pos.	Name	League		Cup		Europe		Total	
No.	Pos.	Name	Apps	Goals	Apps	Goals	Apps	Goals	Apps	Goals
1	GK	(Serbia) Srđan Žakula	3	0	1	0	0	0	4	0
2	DF	(Serbia) Nemanja Radoja	22	0	5	1	0	0	27	1
5	DF	(Montenegro) Igor Vujačić	2	0	0	0	0	0	2	0
6	DF	(Serbia) Branislav Trajković	17	2	5	0	3	0	25	2
7	MF	(Serbia) Enver Alivodić	13	5	3	0	0	0	16	5
9	FW	(Serbia) Đorđe Šušnjar	8	0	2	0	0	0	10	0
10	MF	(Bosnia and Herzegovina) Stojan Vranješ	13	3	3	0	0	0	16	3
11	MF	(Serbia) Mijat Gaćinović	5	1	1	0	0	0	6	1
12	GK	(Serbia) Miloš Čavić	0	0	0	0	0	0	0	0
13	MF	(Serbia) Vuk Mitošević	10	0	2	0	3	0	15	0
14	FW	(Cameroon) Aboubakar Oumarou	29	11	6	3	4	3	39	17
15	DF	(Serbia) Bojan Nastić	14	0	0	0	0	0	14	0
17	MF	(Montenegro) Nebojša Kosović	19	1	3	0	0	0	22	1
18	MF	(Serbia) Marko Poletanović	19	0	3	0	3	0	25	0
19	DF	(Serbia) Stefan Nikolić	0	0	0	0	0	0	0	0
20	MF	(Serbia) Milan Spremo	0	0	0	0	0	0	0	0
21	MF	(Serbia) Miloš Deletić	7	1	1	0	0	0	8	1
22	DF	(Serbia) Miroslav Vulićević	26	3	6	0	4	0	36	3
23	DF	(Serbia) Igor Đurić	21	2	2	0	4	0	27	2
26	MF	(Serbia) Nemanja Sekulić	2	0	0	0	0	0	2	0
27	GK	(Bosnia and Herzegovina) Nemanja Supić	28	0	5	0	4	0	37	0
28	MF	(Nigeria) Nnaemeka Ajuru	19	0	5	0	4	0	28	0
29	MF	(Serbia) Goran Smiljanić	11	0	1	0	1	0	13	0
30	GK	(Montenegro) Marko Kordić	0	0	0	0	0	0	0	0
31	DF	(Serbia) Vladan Pavlović	15	0	4	0	4	0	23	0
33	MF	(Serbia) Aleksandar Katai	20	5	5	0	0	0	25	5
34	FW	(Serbia) Georgije Ilić	1	0	0	0	0	0	1	0
37	DF	(Serbia) Đorđe Jokić	20	0	4	0	2	0	26	0
Players sold or loaned out during the season
3	DF	(Serbia) Vladimir Branković	4	0	2	0	0	0	6	0
4	MF	(Netherlands) Serginho Greene	7	0	2	0	2	0	11	0
7	FW	(Serbia) Petar Škuletić	3	0	1	0	3	1	7	1
8	FW	(Ghana) Yaw Antwi	3	0	0	0	0	0	3	0
9	FW	(Serbia) Milan Bojović	12	3	3	1	4	1	19	5
10	MF	(Guinea-Bissau) Almami Moreira	13	1	3	0	4	1	20	2
11	FW	(Bosnia and Herzegovina) Nemanja Bilbija	9	0	2	0	3	0	14	0
16	MF	(Bosnia and Herzegovina) Miroslav Stevanović	15	2	2	0	4	1	21	3
24	DF	(Serbia) Dejan Karan	0	0	1	0	0	0	1	0
25	GK	(Serbia) Aleksandar Kesić	0	0	0	0	0	0	0	0
32	MF	(Serbia) Dejan Meleg	7	0	1	0	0	0	8	0

== Matches ==
=== Serbian SuperLiga ===
Date	Round	Opponents	Ground	Result	Scorers
12 August 2012	1	Smederevo	H	0 – 0	–
18 August 2012	2	Spartak	A	1 – 0	Stevanović 50'
25 August 2012	3	BSK	H	1 – 0	Moreira 86'
1 September 2012	4	Donji Srem	A	1 – 0	Bojović 56'
16 September 2012	5	Jagodina	H	1 – 1	Đurić 20'
22 September 2012	6	OFK Beograd	A	0 – 0	–
29 September 2012	7	Partizan	H	0 – 3	–
7 October 2012	8	Sloboda	A	1 – 1	Bojović 65'
20 October 2012	9	Hajduk Kula	H	1 – 1	Bojović 78'
28 October 2012	10	Javor	H	1 – 0	Oumarou 77' (pen.)
4 November 2012	11	Rad	A	1 – 1	Trajković 70'
10 November 2012	12	Novi Pazar	H	1 – 0	Katai 4'
17 November 2012	13	Radnički Niš	A	1 – 0	Oumarou 87'
24 December 2012	14	Radnički Kragujevac	H	0 – 0	–
1 December 2012	15	Crvena Zvezda	A	3 – 0	Oumarou 22', 45', Stevanović 47'
27 February 2013	16	Smederevo	A	2 – 1	Vulićević 43', Vranješ 80'
2 March 2013	17	Spartak	H	2 – 1	Alivodić 23', Katai 56'
9 March 2013	18	BSK	A	3 – 3	Oumarou 40', 80' (pen.), Kosović 90'
19 March 2013	19	Donji Srem	H	3 – 0	Vranješ 15', Katai 45', 87'
30 March 2013	20	Jagodina	A	1 – 0	Oumarou 30'
3 April 2013	21	OFK Beograd	H	0 – 1	–
7 April 2013	22	Partizan	A	2 – 1	Oumarou 43', Alivodić 56'
13 April 2013	23	Sloboda	H	2 – 2	Alivodić 10', Vranješ 66'
20 April 2013	24	Hajduk Kula	A	0 – 0	–
27 April 2013	25	Javor	A	4 – 0	Oumarou 7', Alivodić 54', Katai 62', Deletić 88'
2 May 2013	26	Rad	H	1 – 0	Vulićević 81'
12 May 2013	27	Novi Pazar	A	1 – 0	Đurić 90'
18 May 2013	28	Radnički Niš	H	3 – 2	Gaćinović 4', Vulićević 8', Oumarou 66' (pen.)
22 May 2013	29	Radnički Kragujevac	A	0 – 2	–
26 May 2013	30	Crvena Zvezda	H	3 – 0	Oumarou 43' (pen.), Alivodić 56', Trajković 73'

=== Serbian Cup ===
Date	Round	Opponents	Ground	Result	Scorers
26 September 2012	1/16	Donji Srem	H	1 – 0	Bojović 59'
24 October 2012	1/8	Čukarički	A	1 – 0	Oumarou 50'
21 November 2012	1/4	Spartak	A	1 – 1 (5–3p)	Oumarou 88'
13 March 2013	1/2	OFK Beograd	H	1 – 0	Oumarou 70'
17 April 2013	1/2	OFK Beograd	A	1 – 1	Radoja 60'
8 May 2013	Final	Jagodina	N	0 – 1	–

=== UEFA Europa League ===
Date	Round	Opponents	Ground	Result	Scorers
19 July 2012	Second qualifying round	(Lithuania) Sūduva	H	1 – 1	Oumarou 90+3'
26 July 2012	Second qualifying round	(Lithuania) Sūduva	A	4 – 0	Moreira 4', Škuletić 37', Stevanović 40', Oumarou 48'
2 August 2012	Third qualifying round	(Austria) Rapid Wien	H	2 – 1	Oumarou 75', Bojović 90+4'
9 August 2012	Third qualifying round	(Austria) Rapid Wien	A	0 – 2	–
