= 2008–09 FK Vojvodina season =

Vojvodina
2008–09 season
- President: Vojislav Gajić
- Head coach: Dragoljub Bekvalac (until October 2008); Dragan Radojičić (October 2008–December 2008); Ljupko Petrović (December 2008–March 2009); Zoran Marić (from March 2009)
- Serbian SuperLiga: Runners-up
- Serbian Cup: Round of 16
- UEFA Cup: Second qualifying round
- Top goalscorer: League: Dragan Mrđa (13); All: Dragan Mrđa (14)

The 2008–09 season was FK Vojvodina's 3rd season in Serbian SuperLiga. This article shows player statistics and all matches (official and friendly) that the club played during the 2008–09 season.

== Players ==
=== Squad information ===
Note: Flags indicate national team as defined under FIFA eligibility rules; some limited exceptions apply. Players may hold more than one non-FIFA nationality.

No.	Pos.	Nation	Player
1	GK	(Serbia) SRB	Darko Ristić
2	DF	(Uganda) UGA	Joseph Kizito
3	MF	(Serbia) SRB	Slobodan Medojević
4	MF	(Serbia) SRB	Goran Smiljanić
5	DF	(Serbia) SRB	Mitar Peković
6	DF	(Serbia) SRB	Aleksandar Mijatović
7	FW	(Serbia) SRB	Nenad Stojanović
8	MF	(Serbia) SRB	Vladimir Vukajlović
9	FW	(Georgia (country)) GEO	Mikheil Khutsishvili
10	FW	(Serbia) SRB	Vladimir Buač
11	MF	(Montenegro) MNE	Slaven Stjepanović
12	GK	(Serbia) SRB	Aleksandar Kesić
13	MF	(Serbia) SRB	Aleksandar Popović (captain)
14	MF	(Montenegro) MNE	Janko Tumbasević
15	DF	(Serbia) SRB	Darko Lovrić
16	DF	(Serbia) SRB	Miodrag Stošić

No.	Pos.	Nation	Player
17	MF	(North Macedonia) MKD	Mario Đurovski
18	DF	(Serbia) SRB	Vladan Pavlović
19	MF	(Switzerland) SUI	Boban Maksimović
20	MF	(Brazil) BRA	Leandro Montebeler
21	MF	(North Macedonia) MKD	Vlatko Grozdanoski
22	FW	(Serbia) SRB	Miodrag Pantelić
24	DF	(Serbia) SRB	Igor Đurić
27	MF	(Serbia) SRB	Veseljko Trivunović
28	DF	(Montenegro) MNE	Risto Lakić
30	GK	(Serbia) SRB	Željko Brkić
31	MF	(Serbia) SRB	Dušan Tadić
32	FW	(Serbia) SRB	Žarko Lazetić
33	FW	(Serbia) SRB	Danijel Aleksić
34	MF	(Bosnia and Herzegovina) BIH	Miroslav Stevanović
35	MF	(Serbia) SRB	Vuk Mitošević
81	FW	(Serbia) SRB	Dragan Mrđa

=== Squad statistics ===
No.	Pos.	Name	League		Cup		Europe		Total	
No.	Pos.	Name	Apps	Goals	Apps	Goals	Apps	Goals	Apps	Goals
1	GK	(Serbia) Darko Ristić	0	0	0	0	0	0	0	0
2	DF	(Uganda) Joseph Kizito	31	0	0	0	3	0	34	0
3	MF	(Serbia) Slobodan Medojević	2	0	0	0	0	0	2	0
4	MF	(Serbia) Goran Smiljanić	0	0	0	0	0	0	0	0
5	DF	(Serbia) Mitar Peković	7	0	0	0	0	0	7	0
6	DF	(Serbia) Aleksandar Mijatović	15	0	1	0	3	0	19	0
7	FW	(Serbia) Nenad Stojanović	8	2	1	0	0	0	9	2
8	MF	(Serbia) Vladimir Vukajlović	15	0	1	0	4	0	20	0
9	FW	(Georgia (country)) Mikheil Khutsishvili	6	0	0	0	0	0	6	0
10	FW	(Serbia) Vladimir Buač	30	1	2	0	4	0	36	1
11	MF	(Montenegro) Slaven Stjepanović	11	1	1	1	0	0	12	2
12	GK	(Serbia) Aleksandar Kesić	7	0	0	0	0	0	7	0
13	MF	(Serbia) Aleksandar Popović	25	1	2	1	4	0	31	2
14	MF	(Montenegro) Janko Tumbasević	22	2	1	0	3	0	26	2
15	DF	(Serbia) Darko Lovrić	19	0	2	0	1	0	22	0
16	DF	(Serbia) Miodrag Stošić	25	0	2	1	4	0	31	1
17	MF	(North Macedonia) Mario Đurovski	13	1	0	0	0	0	13	1
18	DF	(Serbia) Vladan Pavlović	5	0	2	0	2	0	9	0
19	MF	(Switzerland) Boban Maksimović	0	0	0	0	0	0	0	0
20	MF	(Brazil) Leandro Montebeler	1	0	0	0	0	0	1	0
21	MF	(North Macedonia) Vlatko Grozdanoski	22	2	1	0	3	0	26	2
22	FW	(Serbia) Miodrag Pantelić	22	1	2	0	4	0	28	1
24	DF	(Serbia) Igor Đurić	22	3	2	0	4	2	28	5
27	MF	(Serbia) Veseljko Trivunović	16	2	0	0	2	0	18	2
28	DF	(Montenegro) Risto Lakić	9	0	1	0	0	0	10	0
30	GK	(Serbia) Željko Brkić	27	0	2	0	3	0	32	0
31	MF	(Serbia) Dušan Tadić	29	9	1	0	2	0	32	9
32	FW	(Serbia) Žarko Lazetić	20	1	0	0	2	0	22	1
33	FW	(Serbia) Danijel Aleksić	22	4	1	1	4	0	27	5
34	MF	(Bosnia and Herzegovina) Miroslav Stevanović	0	0	0	0	0	0	0	0
35	MF	(Serbia) Vuk Mitošević	0	0	0	0	0	0	0	0
81	FW	(Serbia) Dragan Mrđa	27	13	2	1	0	0	29	14
Players sold or loaned out during the season
1	GK	(Serbia) Đorđe Babalj	0	0	0	0	1	0	1	0
9	FW	(Uganda) Eugene Sseppuya	1	0	1	0	1	0	3	0
19	FW	(Montenegro) Žarko Korać	0	0	0	0	2	0	2	0

== Matches ==
=== Serbian SuperLiga ===
Date	Round	Opponents	Ground	Result	Scorers
17 August 2008	1	Crvena Zvezda	H	2 – 0	Pantelić 37', Aleksić 89'
23 August 2008	2	Javor	A	0 – 1	–
31 August 2008	3	Čukarički	H	2 – 1	Grozdanoski 37', Đurić 88'
14 September 2008	4	Jagodina	A	1 – 0	Mrđa 9'
20 September 2008	5	Hajduk Kula	H	2 – 0	Tadić 12' (pen.), 28'
27 September 2008	6	Partizan	A	0 – 1	–
4 October 2008	7	Napredak	H	1 – 0	Stojanović 90'
19 October 2008	8	OFK Beograd	A	1 – 2	Đurić 38'
26 October 2008	9	Borac Čačak	H	1 – 0	Aleksić 42'
29 October 2008	10	Rad	A	0 – 1	–
1 November 2008	11	Banat	H	2 – 0	Stojanović 48', Aleksić 50'
8 November 2008	12	Crvena Zvezda	A	1 – 3	Aleksić 59'
15 November 2008	13	Javor	H	1 – 0	Đurić 66'
23 November 2008	14	Čukarički	A	1 – 0	Buač 66'
29 November 2008	15	Jagodina	H	3 – 0	Trivunović 7', Mrđa 50' (pen.), 82'
6 December 2008	16	Hajduk Kula	A	2 – 1	Tadić 76', 88'
10 December 2008	17	Partizan	H	0 – 0	–
28 February 2009	18	Napredak	A	1 – 2	Stjepanović 66'
8 March 2009	19	OFK Beograd	H	1 – 1	Popović 48'
14 March 2009	20	Borac Čačak	A	1 – 1	Mrđa 80'
18 March 2009	21	Rad	H	0 – 1	–
21 March 2009	22	Banat	A	1 – 0	Grozdanoski 72'
4 April 2009	23	Napredak	H	1 – 0	Tadić 12' (pen.)
8 April 2009	24	Čukarički	A	4 – 4	Mrđa 3', 71', Tadić 19' (pen.), Trivunović 59'
12 April 2009	25	Partizan	H	0 – 2	–
18 April 2009	26	Crvena Zvezda	A	1 – 0	Mrđa 55'
22 April 2009	27	Banat	H	4 – 1	Đurovski 28', Tadić 31', Mrđa 82', 86' (pen.)
25 April 2009	28	Javor	H	0 – 0	–
2 May 2009	29	Borac Čačak	A	0 – 1	–
9 May 2009	30	OFK Beograd	H	6 – 1	Tadić 12' (pen.), Tumbasević 42', Mrđa 48', 73' (pen.), 90', Lazetić 51'
17 May 2009	31	Hajduk Kula	A	0 – 0	–
24 May 2009	32	Jagodina	H	1 – 0	Mrđa 45'
30 May 2009	33	Rad	A	2 – 2	Tadić 4', Tumbasević 75'

=== Serbian Cup ===
Date	Round	Opponents	Ground	Result	Scorers
24 September 2008	1/16	Big Bull	A	4 – 0	Stjepanović 38', Mrđa 46', Popović 52', Aleksić 58'
12 November 2008	1/8	Hajduk Beograd	A	1 – 1 (6–7p)	Stošić 55'

=== UEFA Cup ===
Date	Round	Opponents	Ground	Result	Scorers
17 July 2008	First qualifying round	(Azerbaijan) Olimpik-Şüvəlan	H	1 – 0	Đurić 59'
31 July 2008	First qualifying round	(Azerbaijan) Olimpik-Şüvəlan	A	1 – 1	Đurić 86'
14 August 2008	Second qualifying round	(Israel) Hapoel Tel Aviv	H	0 – 0	–
28 August 2008	Second qualifying round	(Israel) Hapoel Tel Aviv	A	0 – 3	–
