= 2013–14 FK Vojvodina season =

Vojvodina
2013–14 season
- President: Milenko Jokić
- Head coach: Marko Nikolić (until December 2013); Branko Babić (from January 2014)
- Serbian SuperLiga: 4th
- Serbian Cup: Winners
- UEFA Europa League: Play-off round
- Top goalscorer: League: Enver Alivodić (5); Andrija Kaluđerović (5); All: Enver Alivodić (9); Petar Škuletić (9)

The 2013–14 season was FK Vojvodina's 8th season in Serbian SuperLiga. This article shows player statistics and all matches (official and friendly) that the club played during the 2013–14 season.

== Players ==
=== Squad information ===
Note: Flags indicate national team as defined under FIFA eligibility rules; some limited exceptions apply. Players may hold more than one non-FIFA nationality.

No.	Pos.	Nation	Player
1	GK	(Serbia) SRB	Srđan Žakula
2	DF	(Serbia) SRB	Nemanja Radoja
4	MF	(Serbia) SRB	Mirko Ivanić
5	DF	(Montenegro) MNE	Milko Novaković
6	DF	(Serbia) SRB	Nino Pekarić
7	MF	(Serbia) SRB	Enver Alivodić
8	MF	(Serbia) SRB	Darko Puškarić
9	FW	(Serbia) SRB	Lazar Veselinović
10	MF	(Serbia) SRB	Luka Luković
11	MF	(Serbia) SRB	Mijat Gaćinović
12	GK	(Serbia) SRB	Milan Jovanić
13	DF	(Serbia) SRB	Radovan Pankov
14	FW	(Serbia) SRB	Uroš Nenadović
15	DF	(Serbia) SRB	Bojan Nastić
16	MF	(Serbia) SRB	Milan Spremo

No.	Pos.	Nation	Player
17	DF	(Serbia) SRB	Marko Živković
18	MF	(Serbia) SRB	Marko Poletanović
19	DF	(Serbia) SRB	Stefan Nikolić
20	MF	(Serbia) SRB	Elmir Asani
21	MF	(Serbia) SRB	Sergej Milinković-Savić
22	FW	(Serbia) SRB	Jovan Stojanović
23	DF	(Serbia) SRB	Igor Đurić (captain)
24	FW	(Serbia) SRB	Georgije Ilić
25	GK	(Montenegro) MNE	Marko Kordić
26	MF	(Bosnia and Herzegovina) BIH	Nikola Popara
27	GK	(Serbia) SRB	Emil Rockov
28	FW	(Serbia) SRB	Luka Grgić
29	FW	(Serbia) SRB	Saša Ćurko
31	FW	(Serbia) SRB	Uroš Stamenić
33	DF	(Serbia) SRB	Srđan Babić

=== Squad statistics ===
No.	Pos.	Name	League		Cup		Europe		Total	
No.	Pos.	Name	Apps	Goals	Apps	Goals	Apps	Goals	Apps	Goals
1	GK	(Serbia) Srđan Žakula	12	0	6	0	0	0	18	0
2	DF	(Serbia) Nemanja Radoja	25	0	6	0	8	0	39	0
4	MF	(Serbia) Mirko Ivanić	10	2	2	0	1	0	13	2
5	DF	(Montenegro) Milko Novaković	6	0	0	0	0	0	6	0
6	DF	(Serbia) Nino Pekarić	12	0	3	0	0	0	15	0
7	MF	(Serbia) Enver Alivodić	28	5	6	2	8	2	42	9
8	MF	(Serbia) Darko Puškarić	10	2	3	0	0	0	13	2
9	FW	(Serbia) Lazar Veselinović	13	4	3	0	0	0	16	4
10	MF	(Serbia) Luka Luković	4	0	0	0	0	0	4	0
11	MF	(Serbia) Mijat Gaćinović	20	0	4	1	3	0	27	1
12	GK	(Serbia) Milan Jovanić	8	0	0	0	0	0	8	0
13	DF	(Serbia) Radovan Pankov	2	0	0	0	0	0	2	0
14	FW	(Serbia) Uroš Nenadović	0	0	0	0	0	0	0	0
15	DF	(Serbia) Bojan Nastić	18	1	2	0	3	0	23	1
16	MF	(Serbia) Milan Spremo	6	0	1	0	0	0	7	0
17	DF	(Serbia) Marko Živković	14	0	3	0	0	0	17	0
18	MF	(Serbia) Marko Poletanović	25	4	6	0	8	0	39	4
19	DF	(Serbia) Stefan Nikolić	2	0	0	0	0	0	2	0
20	MF	(Serbia) Elmir Asani	4	0	0	0	0	0	4	0
21	MF	(Serbia) Sergej Milinković-Savić	13	3	3	0	0	0	16	3
22	FW	(Serbia) Jovan Stojanović	12	3	3	0	0	0	15	3
23	DF	(Serbia) Igor Đurić	17	0	5	0	7	0	29	0
24	FW	(Serbia) Georgije Ilić	3	0	0	0	1	0	4	0
25	GK	(Montenegro) Marko Kordić	0	0	0	0	2	0	2	0
26	MF	(Bosnia and Herzegovina) Nikola Popara	8	1	0	0	0	0	8	1
27	GK	(Serbia) Emil Rockov	0	0	0	0	0	0	0	0
28	FW	(Serbia) Luka Grgić	1	0	0	0	0	0	1	0
29	FW	(Serbia) Saša Ćurko	1	0	0	0	0	0	1	0
31	FW	(Serbia) Uroš Stamenić	2	0	0	0	0	0	2	0
33	DF	(Serbia) Srđan Babić	8	0	3	1	0	0	11	1
Players sold or loaned out during the season
3	DF	(Serbia) Nikola Leković	11	0	2	0	4	1	17	1
5	DF	(Montenegro) Igor Vujačić	0	0	0	0	0	0	0	0
6	DF	(Serbia) Branislav Trajković	11	0	0	0	8	1	19	1
8	MF	(Montenegro) Nebojša Kosović	8	1	2	0	3	1	13	2
9	FW	(Serbia) Petar Škuletić	14	4	3	1	8	4	25	9
10	MF	(Bosnia and Herzegovina) Stojan Vranješ	15	2	3	0	8	3	26	5
12	GK	(Croatia) Matej Delač	10	0	2	0	6	0	18	0
13	MF	(Serbia) Vuk Mitošević	0	0	0	0	1	0	1	0
13	DF	(Montenegro) Ivan Fatić	2	0	0	0	0	0	2	0
14	FW	(Cameroon) Aboubakar Oumarou	0	0	0	0	4	3	4	3
16	DF	(Croatia) Mario Barić	0	0	0	0	4	0	4	0
17	MF	(Montenegro) Stefan Denković	1	0	0	0	1	0	2	0
19	FW	(Bosnia and Herzegovina) Nemanja Bilbija	1	0	0	0	4	1	5	1
19	DF	(Serbia) Jagoš Vuković	9	0	3	0	0	0	12	0
20	MF	(Montenegro) Janko Tumbasević	10	0	3	0	4	0	17	0
21	DF	(Serbia) Vladimir Kovačević	0	0	0	0	1	0	1	0
22	DF	(Serbia) Miroslav Vulićević	15	0	3	0	8	1	26	1
28	MF	(Nigeria) Nnaemeka Ajuru	0	0	0	0	0	0	0	0
30	GK	(Serbia) Zoran Popović	0	0	0	0	0	0	0	0
33	MF	(Montenegro) Simon Vukčević	10	0	1	0	2	0	13	0
99	FW	(Serbia) Andrija Kaluđerović	15	5	2	2	4	1	21	8

== Matches ==
=== Serbian SuperLiga ===
Date	Round	Opponents	Ground	Result	Scorers
11 August 2013	1	Donji Srem	H	0 – 0	–
17 August 2013	2	Voždovac	A	1 – 1	Alivodić 64'
25 August 2013	3	Spartak	H	1 – 0	Škuletić 90'
1 September 2013	4	Čukarički	A	0 – 0	–
14 September 2013	5	Novi Pazar	H	2 – 1	Alivodić 16', Škuletić 32'
2 October 2013	6	Radnički Niš	A	1 – 1	Kaluđerović 54'
29 September 2013	7	Partizan	H	2 – 1	Škuletić 73', Živković 88' (o.g.)
6 October 2013	8	Rad	A	2 – 1	Alivodić 9', Kosović 75'
19 October 2013	9	Sloboda	H	1 – 2	Kaluđerović 25'
26 October 2013	10	OFK Beograd	A	2 – 0	Poletanović 29', Škuletić 61'
2 November 2013	11	Radnički Kragujevac	H	2 – 2	Poletanović 23', Kaluđerović 50'
9 November 2013	12	Javor	H	2 – 2	Kaluđerović 4', Vranješ 40'
23 November 2013	13	Jagodina	A	0 – 3	–
30 November 2013	14	Napredak	H	3 – 1	Kaluđerović 17', Vranješ 21', Alivodić 79'
7 December 2013	15	Crvena Zvezda	A	1 – 2	Poletanović 38'
22 February 2014	16	Donji Srem	A	1 – 1	Stojanović 72'
1 March 2014	17	Voždovac	H	2 – 0	Veselinović 6', 84' (pen.)
9 March 2014	18	Spartak	A	1 – 1	Milinković-Savić 5'
15 March 2014	19	Čukarički	H	1 – 1	Poletanović 62'
22 March 2014	20	Novi Pazar	A	0 – 2	–
30 March 2014	21	Radnički Niš	H	1 – 0	Puškarić 44'
5 April 2014	22	Partizan	A	1 – 1	Milinković-Savić 90'
13 April 2014	23	Rad	H	0 – 1	–
17 April 2014	24	Sloboda	A	2 – 1	Alivodić 37', Stojanović 74'
22 April 2014	25	OFK Beograd	H	2 – 0	Stojanović 60', Milinković-Savić 65'
26 April 2014	26	Radnički Kragujevac	A	1 – 1	Veselinović 9'
3 May 2014	27	Javor	A	1 – 2	Ivanić 21'
10 May 2014	28	Jagodina	H	0 – 1	–
25 May 2014	29	Napredak	A	2 – 0	Ivanić 31', Nastić 59'
28 May 2014	30	Crvena Zvezda	H	3 – 3	Veselinović 48', Puškarić 53', Popara 63'

=== Serbian Cup ===
Date	Round	Opponents	Ground	Result	Scorers
25 September 2013	1/16	Sloga Kraljevo	A	1 – 1 (3–2p)	Kaluđerović 10'
30 October 2013	1/8	Novi Pazar	H	0 – 0 (3–0p)	–
4 December 2013	1/4	Crvena Zvezda	A	3 – 1	Kaluđerović 10', Alivodić 58', Škuletić 71'
26 March 2014	1/2	Spartak	H	1 – 0	Gaćinović 59'
9 April 2014	1/2	Spartak	A	1 – 0	Milinković-Savić 75'
7 May 2014	Final	Jagodina	N	2 – 0	Alivodić 40', Babić 52'

=== UEFA Europa League ===
Date	Round	Opponents	Ground	Result	Scorers
4 July 2013	First qualifying round	(Malta) Hibernians	A	4 – 1	Škuletić 40', Rodolfo Soares 43' (o.g.), Oumarou 50', Kosović 82'
11 July 2013	First qualifying round	(Malta) Hibernians	H	3 – 2	Alivodić 40', Škuletić 62', 67'
18 July 2013	Second qualifying round	(Hungary) Budapest Honvéd	H	2 – 0	Trajković 19', Vranješ 71' (pen.)
25 July 2013	Second qualifying round	(Hungary) Budapest Honvéd	A	3 – 1	Bilbija 27', Alivodić 41', Vranješ 64'
1 August 2013	Third qualifying round	(Turkey) Bursaspor	H	2 – 2	Vulićević 71', Oumarou 81'
8 August 2013	Third qualifying round	(Turkey) Bursaspor	A	3 – 0	Oumarou 9', Vranješ 29', Kaluđerović 83'
22 August 2013	Play-off round	(Moldova) Sheriff Tiraspol	H	1 – 1	Škuletić 54'
29 August 2013	Play-off round	(Moldova) Sheriff Tiraspol	A	1 – 2	Leković 90'
