= 2011–12 FK Vojvodina season =

Vojvodina
2011–12 season
- President: Ratko Butorović
- Head coach: Ljubomir Ristovski (until August 2011); Dejan Vukićević (August 2011–April 2012); Spasoje Jelačić (April 2012); Zlatomir Zagorčić (from April 2012)
- Serbian SuperLiga: 3rd
- Serbian Cup: Semi-finals
- UEFA Europa League: Second qualifying round
- Top goalscorer: League: Aboubakar Oumarou (9); All: Aboubakar Oumarou (11)

The 2011–12 season was FK Vojvodina's 6th season in Serbian SuperLiga. This article shows player statistics and all matches (official and friendly) that the club played during the 2011–12 season.

== Players ==
=== Squad information ===
Note: Flags indicate national team as defined under FIFA eligibility rules; some limited exceptions apply. Players may hold more than one non-FIFA nationality.

No.	Pos.	Nation	Player
1	GK	(Serbia) SRB	Budimir Janošević
2	MF	(Serbia) SRB	Milan Spremo
3	DF	(Serbia) SRB	Vladimir Branković
4	MF	(Ghana) GHA	Stephen Appiah
5	DF	(North Macedonia) MKD	Daniel Mojsov
6	DF	(Serbia) SRB	Branislav Trajković
7	FW	(Serbia) SRB	Petar Škuletić
8	MF	(Serbia) SRB	Goran Smiljanić
9	FW	(Montenegro) MNE	Šaleta Kordić
10	MF	(Guinea-Bissau) GNB	Almami Moreira
11	MF	(Serbia) SRB	Slobodan Novaković
13	MF	(Serbia) SRB	Vuk Mitošević
14	FW	(Cameroon) CMR	Aboubakar Oumarou

No.	Pos.	Nation	Player
15	DF	(Serbia) SRB	Bojan Nastić
16	MF	(Bosnia and Herzegovina) BIH	Miroslav Stevanović
18	MF	(Serbia) SRB	Marko Poletanović
19	DF	(Serbia) SRB	Milovan Milović
21	MF	(Montenegro) MNE	Nebojša Kosović
22	DF	(Serbia) SRB	Miroslav Vulićević (captain)
26	DF	(Serbia) SRB	Vladimir Kovačević
27	GK	(Bosnia and Herzegovina) BIH	Nemanja Supić
28	MF	(Nigeria) NGA	Nnaemeka Ajuru
31	DF	(Serbia) SRB	Vladan Pavlović
32	GK	(Montenegro) MNE	Marko Kordić
55	FW	(Serbia) SRB	Milan Bojović
69	MF	(Serbia) SRB	Aleksandar Katai

=== Squad statistics ===
No.	Pos.	Name	League		Cup		Europe		Total	
No.	Pos.	Name	Apps	Goals	Apps	Goals	Apps	Goals	Apps	Goals
1	GK	(Serbia) Budimir Janošević	4	0	0	0	0	0	4	0
2	MF	(Serbia) Milan Spremo	1	0	0	0	0	0	1	0
3	DF	(Serbia) Vladimir Branković	7	0	3	0	2	0	12	0
4	MF	(Ghana) Stephen Appiah	11	1	2	0	0	0	13	1
5	DF	(North Macedonia) Daniel Mojsov	25	2	3	0	2	0	30	2
6	DF	(Serbia) Branislav Trajković	25	0	3	0	2	0	30	0
7	FW	(Serbia) Petar Škuletić	22	4	4	0	0	0	26	4
8	MF	(Serbia) Goran Smiljanić	11	0	3	0	0	0	14	0
9	FW	(Montenegro) Šaleta Kordić	4	0	0	0	0	0	4	0
10	MF	(Guinea-Bissau) Almami Moreira	9	0	2	0	0	0	11	0
11	MF	(Serbia) Slobodan Novaković	12	0	1	0	0	0	13	0
13	MF	(Serbia) Vuk Mitošević	16	1	5	0	2	0	23	1
14	FW	(Cameroon) Aboubakar Oumarou	30	9	5	1	2	1	37	11
15	DF	(Serbia) Bojan Nastić	1	0	0	0	0	0	1	0
16	MF	(Bosnia and Herzegovina) Miroslav Stevanović	30	6	5	0	2	0	37	6
18	MF	(Serbia) Marko Poletanović	12	0	1	0	0	0	13	0
19	DF	(Serbia) Milovan Milović	7	0	1	0	0	0	8	0
21	MF	(Montenegro) Nebojša Kosović	1	0	0	0	0	0	1	0
22	DF	(Serbia) Miroslav Vulićević	25	0	5	0	2	0	32	0
26	DF	(Serbia) Vladimir Kovačević	3	0	0	0	0	0	3	0
27	GK	(Bosnia and Herzegovina) Nemanja Supić	26	0	5	0	2	0	33	0
28	MF	(Nigeria) Nnaemeka Ajuru	12	0	2	0	1	0	15	0
31	DF	(Serbia) Vladan Pavlović	23	0	2	0	2	0	27	0
32	GK	(Montenegro) Marko Kordić	0	0	0	0	0	0	0	0
55	FW	(Serbia) Milan Bojović	27	7	5	0	0	0	32	7
69	MF	(Serbia) Aleksandar Katai	11	1	2	0	0	0	13	1
Players sold or loaned out during the season
4	MF	(Serbia) Slobodan Medojević	15	2	3	1	2	0	20	3
7	FW	(Serbia) Nemanja Čović	1	0	0	0	2	1	3	1
9	FW	(Serbia) Brana Ilić	13	7	3	1	2	1	18	9
17	MF	(Georgia (country)) Giorgi Merebashvili	13	3	3	1	2	0	18	4
18	FW	(Ghana) Yaw Antwi	4	0	0	0	1	0	5	0
20	MF	(Serbia) Marko Ljubinković	5	1	1	0	0	0	6	1
21	FW	(Bosnia and Herzegovina) Nemanja Bilbija	5	0	0	0	0	0	5	0
24	DF	(Serbia) Dejan Karan	4	0	1	0	0	0	5	0
30	GK	(Serbia) Đorđe Lazović	0	0	0	0	0	0	0	0

== Matches ==
=== Serbian SuperLiga ===
Date	Round	Opponents	Ground	Result	Scorers
13 August 2011	1	Radnički Kragujevac	H	1 – 1	Bojović 85'
20 August 2011	2	Metalac	A	3 – 0	Oumarou 59', Ilić 63', 73'
27 August 2011	3	Novi Pazar	H	3 – 0	Ilić 10' (pen.), Mojsov 37', Oumarou 45'
10 September 2011	4	Sloboda	A	2 – 2	Ilić 14' (pen.), Oumarou 43'
17 September 2011	5	OFK Beograd	H	2 – 0	Oumarou 57', Bojović 90'
24 September 2011	6	Jagodina	A	1 – 1	Stevanović 66'
1 October 2011	7	Partizan	H	1 – 2	Bojović 71'
16 October 2011	8	Rad	A	1 – 1	Medojević 49'
22 October 2011	9	Hajduk Kula	H	4 – 0	Medojević 39', Merebashvili 42', Škuletić 50', Stevanović 74'
30 October 2011	10	Spartak	H	1 – 1	Merebashvili 76'
5 November 2011	11	Javor	A	0 – 0	–
19 November 2011	12	Smederevo	H	2 – 0	Ilić 12', Stevanović 88'
26 November 2011	13	BSK	A	4 – 0	Merebashvili 36' (pen.), Škuletić 43', Oumarou 52', Bojović 60'
3 December 2011	14	Borac Čačak	H	3 – 1	Bojović 53', Ilić 75', 90'
10 December 2011	15	Crvena Zvezda	A	2 – 0	Stevanović 67', Ljubinković 87'
4 March 2012	16	Radnički Kragujevac	A	0 – 0	–
10 March 2012	17	Metalac	H	0 – 0	–
14 March 2012	18	Novi Pazar	A	2 – 1	Škuletić 36', Mitošević 44'
17 March 2012	19	Sloboda	H	2 – 0	Mojsov 82', Katai 88'
24 March 2012	20	OFK Beograd	A	0 – 1	–
31 March 2012	21	Jagodina	H	0 – 0	–
4 April 2012	22	Partizan	A	1 – 4	Škuletić 29'
7 April 2012	23	Rad	H	0 – 2	–
14 April 2012	24	Hajduk Kula	A	1 – 0	Stevanović 53'
21 April 2012	25	Spartak	A	1 – 5	Bojović 59'
25 April 2012	26	Javor	H	1 – 1	Oumarou 81'
28 April 2012	27	Smederevo	A	0 – 2	–
5 May 2012	28	BSK	H	2 – 0	Oumarou 16', 29' (pen.)
15 May 2012	29	Borac Čačak	A	2 – 0	Stevanović 37', Bojović 62'
20 May 2012	30	Crvena Zvezda	H	2 – 1	Appiah 15', Oumarou 90'

=== Serbian Cup ===
Date	Round	Opponents	Ground	Result	Scorers
21 September 2011	1/16	Donji Srem	A	1 – 0	Medojević 69'
26 October 2011	1/8	Inđija	A	2 – 1	Merebashvili 71', Ilić 82'
23 November 2011	1/4	Javor	H	1 – 0	Oumarou 88'
31 March 2012	1/2	Borac Čačak	A	0 – 0	–
11 April 2012	1/2	Borac Čačak	H	0 – 1	–

=== UEFA Europa League ===
Date	Round	Opponents	Ground	Result	Scorers
14 July 2011	Second qualifying round	(Liechtenstein) Vaduz	A	2 – 0	Oumarou 60', Ilić 70'
21 July 2011	Second qualifying round	(Liechtenstein) Vaduz	H	1 – 3	Čović 88'
