= 2010–11 Serbian Cup =

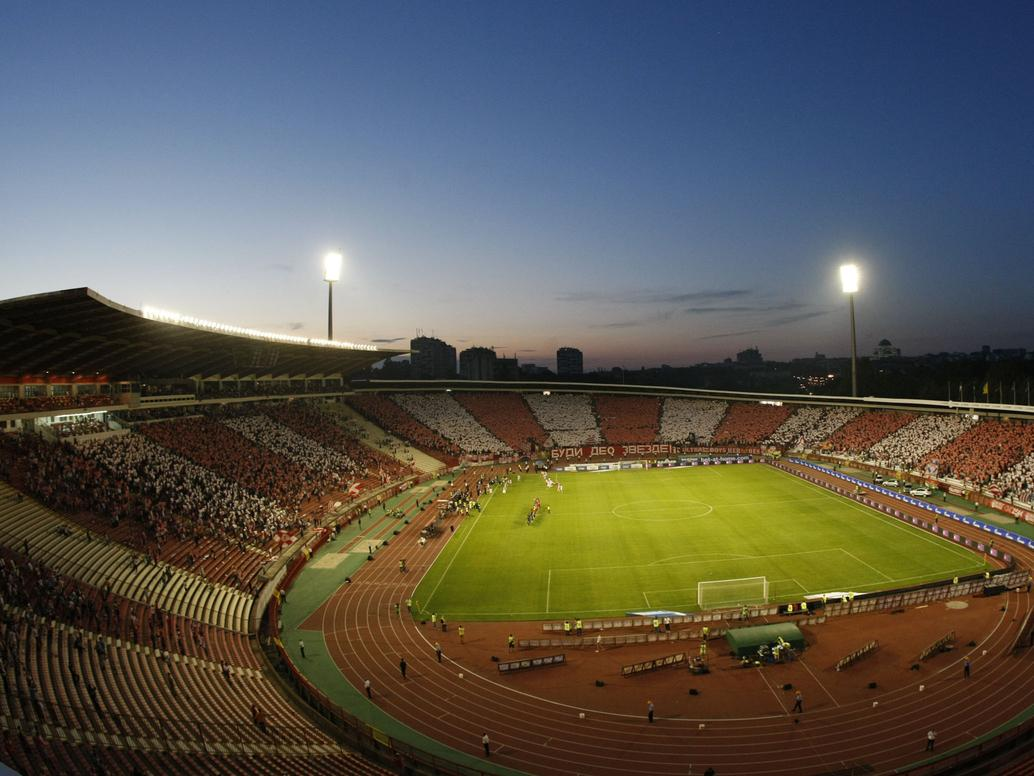
- Red Star Stadium hosted the final

Tournament details
- Country: Serbia

Final positions
- Champions: FK Partizan
- Runners-up: FK Vojvodina

Tournament statistics
- Matches played: 40
- Goals scored: 100 (2.5 per match)
- Top goal scorer: Andrija Kaluđerović

Awards
- Best player: Andrija Kaluđerović

The 2010–11 Serbian Cup season was the fifth season of the Serbian national football tournament. The competition started on 1 September 2010 and concluded with the final on 11 May 2011. FK Partizan won the title 2–1 over FK Vojvodina in controversial fashion. After a series of disputed referee decisions against Vojvodina, the team walked off the pitch and refused to finish the match, leading Partizan to be declared the winner as time expired.

However, later this decision was revised pending further investigation. On Monday, May 16, 2011, the Cup final match result is registered with a Vojvodina forfeit (0:3 victory for Partizan).

== Preliminary round ==
A preliminary round was held in order to reduce the number of teams competing in the next round to 32 and featured 14 teams from Serbian lower divisions. The matches were played on 1 September 2010.

Team 1	Score	Team 2
Srem Jakovo (III)	1–0	ČSK Čelarevo (III)
Sloga Petrovac (III)	1–1 (p. 5–3)	Zemun (II)
Sinđelić Niš (II)	2–0	Dinamo Vranje (II)
Donji Srem (III)	3–2	Banat Zrenjanin (II)
Mokra Gora (IV)	1–1 (p. 5–4)	Mladost Lučani (II)
Mladost Apatin (III)	3–2	Radnički Sombor (II)
Sloga Kraljevo (III)	2–1	Radnički Niš (III)

Note: Roman numerals in brackets denote the league tier the clubs participate in during the 2010–11 season.

== Round of 32 ==
In this round entered seven winners from the previous round as well as all 16 teams from Serbian Superliga from 2009 to 2010 and 9 teams from Serbian First League from 2009 to 2010. Draw was held on September 10, 2010. The matches were played on 22 September, 28 September and 6 October 2010.

Team 1	Score	Team 2
BSK Borča	1–1 (p. 3–5)	Srem (II)
Donji Srem (III)	0–2	Rad
Sloga Kraljevo (III)	0–2	Red Star
Spartak Zlatibor Voda	2–1	Novi Pazar (II)
Mokra Gora (IV)	1–1 (p. 8–9)	Smederevo
Srem Jakovo (III)	2–2 (p. 5–4)	Javor
Mladost Apatin (III)	0–6	Partizan
Sinđelić Niš (II)	2–0	Čukarički
Sloga Petrovac (III)	0–2	Vojvodina
Borac Čačak	2–0	Inđija
Teleoptik (II)	2–1	OFK Beograd
Proleter (II)	1–0	Napredak Kruševac (II)
Metalac	1–1 (p. 5–3)	Novi Sad (II)
Jagodina	4–0	Bežanija (II)
Mladi Radnik (II)	1–3	Sloboda Sevojno
Hajduk Kula	0–0 (p. 4–5)	Kolubara (II)

Note: Roman numerals in brackets denote the league tier the clubs participate in during the 2010–11 season.

== Round of 16 ==
This round consists of 16 winners from previous round of competition. Draw was held on October 15, 2010. Matches were played on October 27, 2010. In case of a tie winner was decided by penalty shoot outs.

Team 1	Score	Team 2
Kolubara (II)	1–2	Spartak Zlatibor Voda
Srem Jakovo (III)	2–2 (p. 6–7)	Vojvodina
Srem (II)	0–2	Jagodina
Red Star	4–0	Borac Čačak
Smederevo	0–0 (p. 3–4)	Teleoptik (II)
Sloboda Sevojno	2–1	Metalac
Partizan	3–0	Proleter (II)
Sinđelić Niš (II)	0–0 (p. 4–2)	Rad

Note: Roman numerals in brackets denote the league tier the clubs participate in during the 2010–11 season.

== Quarter-finals ==
This round consists of 8 winners from previous round of competition. Draw was held on October 29, 2010. Matches will be played on November 10, 2010. In case of a tie winner will be decided by penalty shoot outs.

Team 1	Score	Team 2
Sloboda Sevojno	3–2	Spartak Zlatibor Voda
Vojvodina	1–0	Jagodina
Red Star	2–1	Teleoptik (II)
Sinđelić Niš (II)	0–4	Partizan

Note: Roman numerals in brackets denote the league tier the clubs participate in during the 2010–11 season.

== Semi-finals ==
The semi-final will take place in two legs, on March 16 and April 6. The round consists of two-legged ties. Draw was held on December 1, 2010. No teams were seeded.

Team 1	Agg.	Team 2	1st leg	2nd leg
Partizan	2–1	Red Star	2−0	0−1
Sloboda PS	1–3	Vojvodina	1−2	0−1

=== First legs ===
16 March 2011 SF	Partizan	2–0	Red Star	Belgrade, Serbia
17:00	Tagoe 4', 49'			Stadium: Stadion FK Partizan; Attendance: 25,000; Referee: Milan Karadžić

16 March 2011 SF	Sloboda PS	1–2	Vojvodina	Lučani, Serbia
14:00	Kovačević 21'		Oumarou 30'; Mojsov 32'	Stadium: Stadion Mladost; Attendance: 5,600; Referee: Milenko Vukadinović

=== Second legs ===
6 April 2011 SF	Red Star	1−0 (1−2 agg.)	Partizan	Belgrade, Serbia
17:00	Kaluđerović 72'			Stadium: Stadion FK Crvena zvezda Attendance: 41,682; Referee: Slobodan Veselinović

6 April 2011 SF	Vojvodina	1−0 (3−1 agg.)	Sloboda PS	Novi Sad, Serbia
14.00	Katai 7'			Stadium: Stadion Karađorđe; Attendance: 3,000; Referee: Danilo Mihajlović

== Final ==
11 May 2011
20:15

Vojvodina	0–3 (offic. res.)^{1}	Partizan
Mojsov 63'	Report (in Serbian)	Tagoe 17'; Vukić 72' (pen.)

Stadion FK Crvena Zvezda, Belgrade, Serbia
Attendance: 25.000
Referee: Slobodan Veselinović

Vojvodina	Partizan

FK Vojvodina:
GK	1	(Serbia) Željko Brkić
RB	22	(Serbia) Miroslav Vulićević
CB	6	(Serbia) Branislav Trajković	(yellow card) 83'
CB	5	(North Macedonia) Daniel Mojsov	63' (yellow card) 72'
LB	31	(Serbia) Vladan Pavlović
DM	8	(Montenegro) Janko Tumbasević	(yellow card) 26'
DM	3	(Serbia) Slobodan Medojević	(yellow card) 70'
AM	11	(Serbia) Nikola Lazetić	(yellow card) 8'	(substituted off) 74'
RW	16	(Bosnia and Herzegovina) Miroslav Stevanović		(substituted off) 60'
LW	9	(Serbia) Brana Ilić	(yellow card) 51'
CF	14	(Cameroon) Aboubakar Oumarou
Substitutes:
GK	32	(Serbia) Filip Pajović
DF	15	(Montenegro) Milko Novaković
MF	13	(Serbia) Vuk Mitošević
MF	17	(Georgia (country)) Giorgi Merebashvili		(substituted on) 60'
FW	27	(Serbia) Aleksandar Katai		(substituted on) 74'
FW	21	(Bosnia and Herzegovina) Nemanja Bilbija
FW	18	(Ghana) Yaw Antwi
Manager:
(Serbia) Zoran Milinković

FK Partizan:
GK	88	(Serbia) Vladimir Stojković
RB	2	(Serbia) Aleksandar Miljković
CB	15	(Montenegro) Stefan Savić	(yellow card) 50'
CB	20	(Serbia) Mladen Krstajić
LB	13	(Serbia) Marko Jovanović
DM	4	(Sierra Leone) Medo Kamara
CM	99	(Serbia) Milan Smiljanić		(substituted off) 82'
RW	25	(Serbia) Stefan Babović
LW	7	(Serbia) Nemanja Tomić		(substituted off) 73'
CF	28	(Ghana) Prince Tagoe	17' (yellow card) 19'
CF	77	(Serbia) Ivica Iliev	(yellow card) 2'	(substituted off) 62'
Substitutes:
GK	33	(Serbia) Radiša Ilić
DF	6	(Serbia) Vojislav Stanković
MF	23	(Serbia) Aleksandar Davidov
MF	8	(Serbia) Radosav Petrović		(substituted on) 82'
MF	22	(Serbia) Saša Ilić		(substituted on) 73'
MF	80	(Serbia) Zvonimir Vukić	72' (pen.)	(substituted on) 62'
FW	19	(Serbia) Miloš Bogunović
Manager:
(Serbia) Aleksandar Stanojević

^{1} The match was abandoned in the 83rd minute with Partizan leading 2–1 when Vojvodina walked off to protest the quality of the officiating. Originally, this was declared the final score and the Cup was awarded to Partizan, but on May 16, 2011, after further investigation from Serbian FA concerning the match, the result was officially registered as a 3–0 win to Partizan.
