= 2015–16 Newcastle Jets FC season =

Newcastle Jets
2015–16 season
- Owner: Football Federation Australia
- Manager: Scott Miller
- Stadium: Hunter Stadium, Newcastle
- A-League: 8th
- FFA Cup: Round of 32
- Top goalscorer: League: Miloš Trifunović (9 goals); All: Miloš Trifunović (9 goals)
- Highest home attendance: 14,886 vs Western Sydney Wanderers (7 November 2015)
- Lowest home attendance: 7,120 vs Wellington Phoenix (20 February 2016)
- Average home league attendance: 9,586
Home colours	Away colours	Third colours

The 2015–16 Newcastle Jets FC season was the club's 15th season since its establishment in 2000. The club participated in the A-League for the 11th time and the FFA Cup for the second time.

== Players ==
=== Squad information ===
Note: Flags indicate national team as defined under FIFA eligibility rules; some limited exceptions apply. Players may hold more than one non-FIFA nationality.

No.	Pos.	Nation	Player
1	GK	AUS	Mark Birighitti
2	DF	AUS	Daniel Mullen
3	DF	AUS	Jason Hoffman
4	DF	AUS	Nigel Boogaard (Captain)
5	MF	AUS	Ben Kantarovski
6	MF	AUS	Cameron Watson
7	MF	SRB	Enver Alivodić
8	MF	CRO	Mateo Poljak
10	FW	BRA	Leonardo
11	FW	AUS	Labinot Haliti
12	FW	AUS	Andy Brennan

No.	Pos.	Nation	Player
14	MF	AUS	Mitch Cooper
16	MF	AUS	Steven Ugarković
17	FW	AUS	Radovan Pavicevic
18	MF	AUS	Josh Barresi
19	FW	DEN	Morten Nordstrand
20	GK	AUS	Ben Kennedy
22	DF	AUS	Lachlan Jackson
24	DF	AUS	Nick Cowburn
25	FW	AUS	Brandon Lundy
28	FW	AUS	Ryan Kitto (Injury replacement)

=== From youth squad ===
N	Pos.	Nat.	Name	Age	Notes
24	DF	(Australia)	Nick Cowburn	20	

=== Transfers in ===
No.	Pos.	Nat.	Name	Age	Moving from	Type	Transfer window	Ends	Transfer fee	Source
12	FW	(Australia)	Andy Brennan	22	South Melbourne	Transfer	Pre-season	2017		
4	DF	(Australia)	Nigel Boogaard	28	Adelaide United	Transfer	Pre-season	2018	Free	
1	GK	(Australia)	Mark Birighitti	24	Varese (Italy)	Loan return	Pre-season	2016	Free	
15	DF	(Australia)	Themba Muata-Marlow	21	Sydney FC	Transfer	Pre-season	2017	Free	
22	DF	(Australia)	Lachlan Jackson	20	Brisbane Roar	Transfer	Pre-season	2016	Free	
3	DF	(Australia)	Jason Hoffman	26	Melbourne City	Transfer	Pre-season	2016	Free	
11	FW	(Australia)	Labinot Haliti	29	Western Sydney Wanderers	Transfer	Pre-season	2017	Free	
8	MF	(Croatia)	Mateo Poljak	25	Western Sydney Wanderers	Transfer	Pre-season	2017	Free	
6	MF	(Australia)	Cameron Watson	28	Free agent	Transfer	Pre-season	2016	Free	
10	MF	(Brazil)	Leonardo	32	Free agent	Transfer	Pre-season	2016	Free	
9	FW	(Serbia)	Miloš Trifunović	30	Radnički Niš (Serbia)	Transfer	Pre-season	2016		
28	FW	(Australia)	Ryan Kitto	21	West Torrens Birkalla	Injury Replacement	Round 7	2016		
16	MF	(Australia)	Steven Ugarković	21	Free agent	Transfer	Round 14	2017	Free	
19	FW	(Denmark)	Morten Nordstrand	32	Free agent	Transfer	Round 17	2016		

=== Transfers out ===
No.	Pos.	Nat.	Name	Age	Moving to	Type	Transfer window	Transfer fee	Source
11	DF	(Australia)	Andrew Hoole	21	Sydney FC	Transfer	Pre-season	Free	
8	MF	(Australia)	Zenon Caravella	31		Retired	Pre-season		
1	GK	(Australia)	Jess Vanstrattan	32		Retired	Pre-season		
3	DF	(Australia)	Taylor Regan	26		End of contract	Pre-season		
12	DF	(Australia)	Sam Gallagher	24		End of contract	Pre-season		
17	FW	(Australia)	James Virgili	22		End of contract	Pre-season		
30	GK	(Australia)	John Solari	21		End of contract	Pre-season		
10	FW	(Australia)	Travis Cooper	21	Adamstown Rosebud	Transfer	Pre-season	Free	
2	DF	(Australia)	Scott Neville	26	Western Sydney Wanderers	Transfer	Pre-season	Free	
16	MF	(Australia)	Jacob Pepper	23	Western Sydney Wanderers	Transfer	Pre-season	Free	
13	DF	(South Korea)	Lee Ki-je	24	Ulsan Hyundai (South Korea)	Transfer	Round 11	Undisclosed	
23	MF	(Australia)	David Carney	32		Mutual contract termination	Round 18		
15	DF	(Australia)	Themba Muata-Marlow	21	APIA Leichhardt Tigers	Released	Round 20		
9	FW	(Serbia)	Miloš Trifunović	31		Mutual contract termination	Round 26		

== Technical staff ==
Position	Name
Head coach	(Australia) Scott Miller
Assistant coach	(Australia) Jean-Paul de Marigny
Youth coach	(Australia) Clayton Zane
Football manager	(Australia) Nicholas Deluca (acting)
Physiotherapist	(Australia) Justin Dougherty

== Statistics ==
=== Squad statistics ===
N	Pos.	Nat.	Name	Total					A-League					FFA Cup
N	Pos.	Nat.	Name	Apps	Goals	Yellow card	Second yellow card	Red card	Apps	Goals	Yellow card	Second yellow card	Red card	Apps	Goals	Yellow card	Second yellow card	Red card
1	GK	(Australia)	Mark Birighitti	27	0	2	0	0	26	0	2	0	0	1	0	0	0	0
2	DF	(Australia)	Daniel Mullen	19	0	3	2	0	18	0	2	2	0	1	0	1	0	0
3	DF	(Australia)	Jason Hoffman	26	0	10	0	0	25	0	10	0	0	1	0	0	0	0
4	DF	(Australia)	Nigel Boogaard	22	0	2	2	1	21	0	2	2	1	1	0	0	0	0
5	MF	(Australia)	Ben Kantarovski	23	2	7	1	0	16+6	2	7	1	0	0+1	0	0	0	0
6	MF	(Australia)	Cameron Watson	18	0	4	0	0	12+5	0	4	0	0	1	0	0	0	0
7	MF	(Serbia)	Enver Alivodić	27	2	1	0	0	26	2	1	0	0	0+1	0	0	0	0
8	MF	(Croatia)	Mateo Poljak	27	2	6	0	0	26	2	6	0	0	1	0	0	0	0
10	FW	(Brazil)	Leonardo	20	1	0	0	0	18+2	1	0	0	0	0	0	0	0	0
11	FW	(Australia)	Labinot Haliti	3	1	0	0	0	1+1	0	0	0	0	1	1	0	0	0
12	FW	(Australia)	Andy Brennan	3	0	0	0	0	0+3	0	0	0	0	0	0	0	0	0
14	MF	(Australia)	Mitch Cooper	13	1	0	0	0	4+8	1	0	0	0	1	0	0	0	0
16	MF	(Australia)	Steven Ugarković	11	1	1	0	0	10+1	1	1	0	0	0+0	0	0	0	0
17	FW	(Australia)	Radovan Pavicevic	7	0	2	0	0	0+7	0	2	0	0	0	0	0	0	0
18	MF	(Australia)	Josh Barresi	0	0	0	0	0	0	0	0	0	0	0	0	0	0	0
19	FW	(Denmark)	Morten Nordstrand	11	4	1	0	0	8+3	4	1	0	0	0	0	0	0	0
20	GK	(Australia)	Ben Kennedy	2	0	0	0	0	1+1	0	0	0	0	0	0	0	0	0
22	DF	(Australia)	Lachlan Jackson	18	0	1	0	0	13+5	0	1	0	0	0	0	0	0	0
24	DF	(Australia)	Nick Cowburn	22	0	4	0	0	14+8	0	4	0	0	0	0	0	0	0
25	FW	(Australia)	Brandon Lundy	2	0	0	0	0	0+1	0	0	0	0	1	0	0	0	0
27	FW	(Australia)	Braedyn Crowley	9	0	0	0	0	1+7	0	0	0	0	0+1	0	0	0	0
28	FW	(Australia)	Ryan Kitto	18	2	1	0	0	12+6	2	1	0	0	0	0	0	0	0
29	MF	(Australia)	Andrew Pawiak	0	0	0	0	0	0	0	0	0	0	0+0	0	0	0	0
40	GK	(Australia)	Blake Tuxford	0	0	0	0	0	0	0	0	0	0	0	0	0	0	0
Players no longer at the club:
9	FW	(Serbia)	Miloš Trifunović	22	9	5	0	0	22	9	5	0	0	0	0	0	0	0
13	DF	(South Korea)	Lee Ki-je	9	0	2	0	0	8	0	1	0	0	1	0	1	0	0
15	DF	(Australia)	Themba Muata-Marlow	0	0	0	0	0	0	0	0	0	0	0	0	0	0	0
23	MF	(Australia)	David Carney	16	4	7	0	0	15	3	6	0	0	1	1	1	0	0

- Last updated: 9 April 2016
- Source: au.soccerway.com
- (yellow card) = Number of bookings; (second yellow card) = Number of sending offs after a second yellow card; (red card) = Number of sending offs by a direct red card.

== Pre-season and friendlies ==
5 August 2015	Central Coast Mariners	2–1	Newcastle Jets	Gosford
Wednesday	Bosnar; Fitzgerald	Report		Stadium: Central Coast Stadium; Attendance: Behind closed doors

16 August 2015	Melbourne City	1–1	Newcastle Jets	Melbourne
Sunday				Stadium: AAMI Park; Attendance: Behind closed doors

18 August 2015	Bentleigh Greens	0–1	Newcastle Jets	Melbourne
		Report	Poljak 42' (pen.)	Stadium: Kingston Heath Soccer Complex

12 September 2015	Brisbane Roar	0–0	Newcastle Jets	Redland City, Australia
14:00 AEST		Report		Stadium: Cleveland Showgrounds; Referee: Jarred Gillett

20 September 2015	Central Coast Mariners	0–1	Newcastle Jets	Orange
15:00 AEST		Report	Hoffman 53'	Stadium: Wade Park; Attendance: 2,142; Referee: Matthew Cropper

== Competitions ==
=== Overview ===
Competition	First match	Last match	Starting round	Final position	Record							
Competition	First match	Last match	Starting round	Final position	Pld	W	D	L	GF	GA	GD	Win %
A-League	11 October 2015	9 April 2016	Matchday 1	8th	27	8	6	13	28	41	−13	29.63
FFA Cup	11 August 2015		Round of 32	Round of 32	1	0	1	0	2	2	+0	0.00
Total					28	8	7	13	30	43	−13	28.57

Source: Competitions

=== A-League ===
==== League table ====
Pos	Team	Pld	W	D	L	GF	GA	GD	Pts	Qualification
1	Adelaide United (C)	27	14	7	6	45	28	+17	49	Qualification for 2017 AFC Champions League group stage and Finals series
2	Western Sydney Wanderers	27	14	6	7	44	33	+11	48	Qualification for 2017 AFC Champions League group stage and Finals series
3	Brisbane Roar	27	14	6	7	49	40	+9	48	Qualification for 2017 AFC Champions League second preliminary round and Finals series
4	Melbourne City	27	13	5	9	63	44	+19	44	Qualification for Finals series
5	Perth Glory	27	13	4	10	49	42	+7	43	Qualification for Finals series
6	Melbourne Victory	27	11	8	8	40	33	+7	41	Qualification for Finals series
7	Sydney FC	27	8	10	9	36	36	0	34	
8	Newcastle Jets	27	8	6	13	28	41	−13	30	
9	Wellington Phoenix (Note: Wellington Phoenix cannot qualify for the AFC Champions League as they are not recognised as an AFC club.)	27	7	4	16	34	54	−20	25	
10	Central Coast Mariners	27	3	4	20	33	70	−37	13	

Source: A-Leagues
Rules for classification: 1) points; 2) goal difference; 3) number of goals scored.
(C) Champions

==== Results summary ====
Overall								Home						Away					
Pld	W	D	L	GF	GA	GD	Pts	W	D	L	GF	GA	GD	W	D	L	GF	GA	GD
27	8	6	13	28	41	−13	30	4	3	7	14	23	−9	4	3	6	14	18	−4

Last updated: 9 April 2016.
Source: ultimatealeague.com

==== Results by round ====
Round	1	2	3	4	5	6	7	8	9	10	11	12	13	14	15	16	17	18	19	20	21	22	23	24	25	26	27
Ground	A	H	H	A	H	H	A	H	A	H	H	A	H	A	H	H	A	H	A	H	A	A	H	A	H	A	A
Result	W	L	W	W	L	D	D	D	L	L	D	L	L	L	W	L	L	W	D	W	W	L	L	D	L	L	W
Position	2	6	4	3	3	5	5	5	7	7	7	8	8	8	8	9	9	8	8	8	8	8	8	8	8	8	8

Updated to match(es) played on 9 April 2016. Source: ultimatealeague.com
A = Away; H = Home; W = Win; D = Draw; L = Loss

==== Matches ====
11 October 2015 1	Wellington Phoenix	1–2	Newcastle Jets	Wellington
19:00 NZDT	Lee 45+2' (o.g.)	Report	Carney 30'; Trifunović 70'; Boogaard (yellow card) 52' (yellow-red card) 77'	Stadium: Westpac Stadium; Attendance: 6,255; Referee: Shaun Evans

17 October 2015 2	Newcastle Jets	0–1	Sydney FC	Newcastle
17:15 AEDT		Report	Brosque 89'	Stadium: Hunter Stadium; Attendance: 12,173; Referee: Peter Green

23 October 2015 3	Newcastle Jets	1–0	Melbourne Victory	Newcastle
19:40 AEDT	Carney 75'	Report		Stadium: Hunter Stadium; Attendance: 10,087; Referee: Strebre Delovski

30 October 2015 4	Melbourne City	2–3	Newcastle Jets	Melbourne
19:40 AEDT	Mooy 12'; Mauk 22'	Report	Kantarovski 58'; Trifunović 74' (pen.), 79'	Stadium: AAMI Park; Attendance: 7,209; Referee: Jarred Gillett

7 November 2015 5	Newcastle Jets	1–2	Western Sydney Wanderers	Newcastle
17:15 AEDT	Alivodić 73'	Report	Andreu 79' (pen.); Nichols 86'	Stadium: Hunter Stadium; Attendance: 14,886; Referee: Stephen Lucas

14 November 2015 6	Newcastle Jets	1–1	Central Coast Mariners	Newcastle
17:15 AEDT	Trifunović 83'	Report	McGing (red card) 24'; Sim 90+2'	Stadium: Hunter Stadium; Attendance: 9,422; Referee: Kris Griffiths-Jones

22 November 2015 7	Adelaide United	0–0	Newcastle Jets	Adelaide
16:30 ACDT		Report		Stadium: Coopers Stadium; Attendance: 10,048; Referee: Shaun Evans

28 November 2015 8	Newcastle Jets	1–1	Brisbane Roar	Newcastle
17:15 AEDT	Kantarovski 71'	Report	Maclaren 52'	Stadium: Hunter Stadium; Attendance: 10,155; Referee: Peter Green

4 December 2015 9	Sydney FC	1–0	Newcastle Jets	Sydney
19:40 AEDT	Brosque 57'	Report		Stadium: Allianz Stadium; Attendance: 9,155; Referee: Shaun Evans

13 December 2015 10	Newcastle Jets	0–4	Melbourne City	Newcastle
17:00 AEDT		Report	Mooy 43', 59'; Fornaroli 56', 62'	Stadium: Hunter Stadium; Attendance: 10,087; Referee: Chris Beath

18 December 2015 11	Newcastle Jets	0–0	Adelaide United	Newcastle
19:40 AEDT		Report		Stadium: Hunter Stadium; Attendance: 7,332; Referee: Kris Griffiths-Jones

24 December 2015 12	Western Sydney Wanderers	2–0	Newcastle Jets	Parramatta
19:00 AEDT	Alberto 45+1'; Bridge 70'	Report		Stadium: Pirtek Stadium; Attendance: 10,141; Referee: Stephen Lucas

3 January 2016 13	Newcastle Jets	0–1	Melbourne Victory	Newcastle
17:00 AEDT		Report	Ben Khalfallah 71'	Stadium: Hunter Stadium; Attendance: 8,864; Referee: Jarred Gillett

9 January 2016 14	Sydney FC	2–0	Newcastle Jets	Sydney
17:15 AEDT	Hološko 15'; Abbas 80'	Report		Stadium: ANZ Stadium; Attendance: 15,127; Referee: Jonathan Barreiro

17 January 2016 15	Newcastle Jets	3–1	Wellington Phoenix	Newcastle
17:00 AEDT	Trifunović 7' (pen.); Kitto 26'; Kantarovski (yellow card) 36' (yellow-red card) 58'; Carney 66'	Report	Ridenton 81'	Stadium: Hunter Stadium; Attendance: 7,595; Referee: Jarred Gillett

24 January 2016 16	Newcastle Jets	1–6	Perth Glory	Newcastle
17:00 AEDT	Trifunović 14'; Boogaard (yellow card) 34' (yellow-red card) 45+1'	Report	Harold 24', 54'; Castro 45', 88'; D. Mullen 48' (pen.); A. Grant 74'	Stadium: Hunter Stadium; Attendance: 9,403; Referee: Shaun Evans

31 January 2016 17	Adelaide United	1–0	Newcastle Jets	Adelaide
16:30 ACDT	Carrusca 43'	Report		Stadium: Coopers Stadium; Attendance: 12,434; Referee: Ben Williams

7 February 2016 18	Newcastle Jets	2–1	Melbourne City	Newcastle
17:00 AEDT	Trifunović 48' (pen.), 72'	Report	Melling (red card) 64'; Fornaroli 79'	Stadium: Hunter Stadium; Attendance: 7,266; Referee: Adam Fielding

12 February 2016 19	Brisbane Roar	2–2	Newcastle Jets	Brisbane
19:00 AEST	Maclaren 6'; Alivodić 69' (o.g.)	Report	Cooper 15'; Trifunović 19' (pen.)	Stadium: Suncorp Stadium; Attendance: 9,382; Referee: Kris Griffiths-Jones

20 February 2016 20	Newcastle Jets	3–2	Wellington Phoenix	Newcastle
17:15 AEDT	Durante 27' (o.g.); Nordstrand 53', 73'	Report	Watson 22', 37' (yellow card) 41' (yellow-red card) 71'	Stadium: Hunter Stadium; Attendance: 7,120; Referee: Chris Beath

28 February 2016 21	Central Coast Mariners	0–1	Newcastle Jets	Gosford
17:00 AEDT		Report	Ugarković 57'	Stadium: Central Coast Stadium; Attendance: 7,528; Referee: Ben Williams

7 March 2016 22	Perth Glory	2–0	Newcastle Jets	Perth
17:00 AWST	Keogh 37'; Sándor 46'	Report	D. Mullen (yellow card) 45' (yellow-red card) 58'	Stadium: nib Stadium; Attendance: 11,260; Referee: Chris Beath

13 March 2016 23	Newcastle Jets	0–1	Western Sydney Wanderers	Newcastle
17:00 AEDT		Report	Sotirio 17'	Stadium: Hunter Stadium; Attendance: 12,153; Referee: Koichiro Fukushima (Japan)

20 March 2016 24	Melbourne Victory	1–1	Newcastle Jets	Melbourne
17:00 AEDT	Berisha 57'	Report	Kitto 37'; D. Mullen (yellow card) 5' (yellow-red card) 39'	Stadium: AAMI Park; Attendance: 14,383; Referee: Chris Beath

26 March 2016 25	Newcastle Jets	1–2	Perth Glory	Newcastle
17:15 AEDT	~~Boogaard (red card) 87'~~ (expunged); Poljak 90+2' (pen.)	Report	Vadócz 72'; Keogh 88' (pen.); Djulbic (yellow card) 85' (yellow-red card) 90+1'	Stadium: Hunter Stadium; Attendance: 7,569; Referee: Kris Griffiths-Jones

3 April 2016 26	Brisbane Roar	2–1	Newcastle Jets	Brisbane
17:00 AEST	Henrique 67' (pen.); Broich 74'	Report	Leonardo 50' (pen.); Boogaard (red card) 66'	Stadium: Suncorp Stadium; Attendance: 14,825; Referee: Strebre Delovski

9 April 2016 27	Central Coast Mariners	2–4	Newcastle Jets	Gosford
17:15 AEDT	F. Ferreira 51' (pen.); O'Donovan 76'	Report	Nordstrand 1', 54'; Alivodić 18'; Poljak 79'	Stadium: Central Coast Stadium; Attendance: 7,355; Referee: Jarred Gillett

=== FFA Cup ===
11 August 2015 Round of 32	Newcastle Jets (New South Wales)	2–2 (a.e.t.) (3–4 p)	(Western Australia) Perth Glory	Newcastle
19:30 AEST	Carney 24'; Haliti 115'		Sidnei 87'; Marinković 92'	Stadium: Magic Park; Attendance: 2,563; Referee: Shaun Evans
	Penalties
	Haliti (penalty missed); Poljak (penalty scored); Lee (penalty scored); Carney (penalty missed); Hoffman (penalty scored); Alivodić (penalty missed)		(penalty scored) Marinković; (penalty scored) Valentini; (penalty missed) Harold; (penalty scored) Golec; (penalty missed) Djulbic; (penalty scored) Sándor
