= Slobodan Medojević =

Serbian footballer (born 1990)

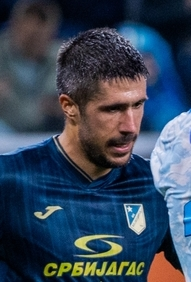

Personal information
- Full name: Slobodan Medojević
- Date of birth: 20 November 1990 (age 35)
- Place of birth: Novi Sad, SFR Yugoslavia
- Height: 1.83 m (6 ft 0 in)
- Positions: Defensive midfielder; centre-back

Youth career
- Vojvodina

Senior career*
Years	Team	Apps	(Gls)
2007–2011	Vojvodina	71	(5)
2012–2014	VfL Wolfsburg	28	(0)
2014–2018	Eintracht Frankfurt	29	(1)
2018–2019	Darmstadt 98	28	(0)
2019–2024	AEL Limassol	110	(5)
2024–2026	Vojvodina	40	(1)

International career
2006–2007	Serbia U17	5	(0)
2008–2009	Serbia U19	10	(1)
2009–2012	Serbia U21	18	(0)
- * Club domestic league appearances and goals as of 12 June 2026

Slobodan Medojević (Serbian Cyrillic: Слободан Медојевић; born 20 November 1990) is a Serbian footballer who last played as a defensive midfielder for Serbian Superliga club Vojvodina.

== Club career ==
=== Vojvodina ===
Medojević came through the youth ranks at Vojvodina and made his professional debut during the 2006–07 season, in a 1–0 away win against Mladost Apatin on 2 May 2007. However, because of his young age, he failed to make appearances during the 2007–08 season. In the 2008–09 season, he returned to the first team and made two league appearances. From the 2009–10 season, Medojević became an important member of the team and collected 25 league appearances, scoring two goals.

=== Wolfsburg ===
On 2 January 2012, after four years playing for Vojvodina, Medojević signed his first contract outside of Serbia with Bundesliga contender VfL Wolfsburg. He finally made his league debut during a 2–2 home draw against 1. FC Nürnberg on 31 March 2013. He was kept off the field by a chronically inflamed achilles tendon while at Wolfsburg, and had not recovered from his injury when he left.

=== Eintracht Frankfurt ===
On 31 August 2014, Medojević signed with Eintracht Frankfurt on a three-year contract. He underwent surgery for his chronic achilles tendon injury, after which a long period of recovery followed. He made his return for Eintracht on 30 September 2017 in a 2–1 win against VfB Stuttgart, after having spent 565 days without playing a professional match.

=== Darmstadt 98 ===
In January 2019, Medojević signed a 1 1/2-year contract with Darmstadt 98.

=== AEL Limassol ===
In September 2019, Medojević joined AEL Limassol.

== Career statistics ==
As of 23 May 2026

Appearances and goals by club, season and competition
Club	Season	League			National cup (Note: Includes Serbian Cup, DFB-Pokal, Cypriot Cup)		Europe		Other		Total	
Club	Season	Division	Apps	Goals	Apps	Goals	Apps	Goals	Apps	Goals	Apps	Goals
Vojvodina	2006–07	Serbian SuperLiga	1	0	0	0	–		—		1	0
Vojvodina	2007–08	Serbian SuperLiga	0	0	0	0	–		—		0	0
Vojvodina	2008–09	Serbian SuperLiga	2	0	0	0	0	0	—		2	0
Vojvodina	2009–10	Serbian SuperLiga	25	2	3	1	–		—		28	3
Vojvodina	2010–11	Serbian SuperLiga	28	1	5	0	—		—		33	1
Vojvodina	2011–12	Serbian SuperLiga	15	2	3	1	2 (Note: Appearances in UEFA Europa League)	0	—		20	3
Vojvodina	Total		71	5	11	2	2	0	—		84	7
VfL Wolfsburg	2011–12	Bundesliga	0	0	0	0	—		—		0	0
VfL Wolfsburg	2012–13	Bundesliga	8	0	1	0	—		—		9	0
VfL Wolfsburg	2013–14	Bundesliga	20	0	2	0	—		—		22	0
VfL Wolfsburg	2014–15	Bundesliga	0	0	1	0	0	0	—		1	0
VfL Wolfsburg	Total		28	0	4	0	0	0	—		32	0
Eintracht Frankfurt	2014–15	Bundesliga	14	0	1	0	—		—		15	0
Eintracht Frankfurt	2015–16	Bundesliga	14	1	1	0	—		0	0	15	1
Eintracht Frankfurt	2016–17	Bundesliga	0	0	1	0	—		—		1	0
Eintracht Frankfurt	2017–18	Bundesliga	1	0	1	0	—		—		2	0
Eintracht Frankfurt	Total		29	1	4	0	—		0	0	33	1
Darmstadt 98	2017–18	2. Bundesliga	12	0	0	0	—		—		12	0
Darmstadt 98	2018–19	2. Bundesliga	16	0	2	0	—		—		18	0
Darmstadt 98	Total		28	0	2	0	—		—		30	0
AEL Limassol	2019–20	Cypriot First Division	15	0	3	0	—		1 (Note: Appearances in Cypriot Super Cup)	0	19	0
AEL Limassol	2020–21	Cypriot First Division	23	1	3	0	—		—		26	1
AEL Limassol	2021–22	Cypriot First Division	20	0	2	0	4 (Note: Appearance in UEFA Europa Conference League)	0	—		26	0
AEL Limassol	2022–23	Cypriot First Division	18	0	3	0	—		—		21	0
AEL Limassol	2023–24	Cypriot First Division	34	4	1	0	—		—		35	4
AEL Limassol	Total		110	5	12	0	4	0	1	0	127	5
Vojvodina	2024–25	Serbian SuperLiga	26	1	5	0	1	0	—		32	1
Vojvodina	2025–26	Serbian SuperLiga	14	0	2	0	—		—		16	0
Vojvodina	Total		40	1	7	0	1	0	—		48	1
Career total			305	12	40	2	7	0	1	0	353	14

== Honours ==
Vojvodina

- Serbian Cup runner-up: 2009–10, 2010–11, 2024–25

VfL Wolfsburg

- DFB-Pokal: 2014–15

Eintracht Frankfurt

- DFB-Pokal: 2017–18; runner-up: 2016–17

AEL Limassol

- Cypriot Cup runner-up: 2022–23
- Cypriot Super Cup runner-up: 2019

Individual

- Serbian SuperLiga Team of the Season: 2010–11
- Serbian SuperLiga Young Footballer of the Year: 2010–11
