= Bojan Nastić =

Bosnian footballer (born 1994)

Personal information
- Date of birth: 6 July 1994 (age 32)
- Place of birth: Vlasenica, Bosnia and Herzegovina
- Height: 1.82 m (6 ft 0 in)
- Position: Left-back

Team information
- Current team: Željezničar
- Number: 15

Youth career
- Vlasenica
- 2009–2012: Vojvodina

Senior career*
Years	Team	Apps	(Gls)
2012–2016	Vojvodina	86	(2)
2016–2019	Genk	39	(0)
2019	→ Oostende (loan)	12	(1)
2019–2021	BATE Borisov	26	(1)
2021–2024	Jagiellonia	65	(1)
2023	Jagiellonia II	3	(0)
2024–2026	Wisła Płock	36	(0)
2026–	Željezničar	18	(0)

International career
2010–2011	Serbia U17	5	(0)
2015	Serbia U21	1	(0)
2018–2020	Bosnia and Herzegovina	5	(0)
- * Club domestic league appearances and goals as of 21 November 2026

Bojan Nastić (pronounced [bǒjan nâːstitɕ]; born 6 July 1994) is a Bosnian professional footballer who plays as a left-back for Bosnian Premier League club Željezničar.

Nastić started his professional career at Vojvodina, before joining Genk in 2016. In 2019, he was loaned to Oostende. Later that year, Nastić moved to BATE Borisov. He signed with Jagiellonia in 2021, before joining Wisła Płock in 2024. He left Wisła to join Željezničar in 2026.

A former Serbian youth international, Nastić made his senior international debut for Bosnia and Herzegovina in 2018, earning 5 caps until 2020.

== Club career ==
=== Early career ===
Nastić started playing football at his hometown club Vlasenica, before joining the youth academy of Serbian team Vojvodina in 2009. He made his professional debut against Rad on 7 April 2012 at the age of 17. On 25 May 2014, he scored his first professional goal in a triumph over Napredak Kruševac.

=== Genk ===
In August 2016, Nastić was transferred to Belgian outfit Genk for an undisclosed fee. He made his official debut for the side against Zulte Waregem on 28 August.

In April 2018, he extended his contract with the squad until June 2020.

In January 2019, Nastić was loaned to Oostende until the end of season.

He won his first trophy with the club on 20 July, by beating Mechelen in the Belgian Super Cup final.

=== BATE Borisov ===
In September, Nastić signed a multi-year deal with Belarusian side BATE Borisov. On 19 March 2020, he made his competitive debut for the team against Energetik-BGU. He won his first title with the club on 24 May, by triumphing over Dynamo Brest in the Belarusian Cup final. On 18 July, he scored his first goal for BATE Borisov in a defeat of Rukh Brest.

=== Jagiellonia ===
In January 2021, Nastić moved to Polish outfit Jagiellonia on a contract until June 2024. He debuted officially for the squad on 7 February against Wisła Kraków. On 20 March, he scored his first goal for Jagiellonia in a victory over Lech Poznań. He won his first piece of silverware with the club on 25 May 2024, when they were crowned league champions.

=== Wisła Płock ===
On 24 June 2024, Nastić moved to second-tier club Wisła Płock on a free transfer. He signed a deal until the end of the 2024–25 season, with a one-year extension option. Nastić debuted there three days later, during a 2–1 away victory over Warta Poznań. He terminated his contract with Wisła and left the club on 17 January 2026.

=== Željezničar ===
After leaving Wisła, Nastić signed a two-and-a-half-year contract with Bosnian Premier League side Željezničar on 18 January. He debuted in a league game against Posušje on 8 February 2026.

== International career ==
Despite representing Serbia at various youth levels, Nastić decided to play for Bosnia and Herzegovina at the senior level.

In May 2018, his request to change sports citizenship from Serbian to Bosnian was approved by FIFA. Later that month, he received his first senior call-up, for friendly games against Montenegro and South Korea. He debuted against the former on 28 May.

== Personal life ==
Nastić married his long-time girlfriend Eline in December 2019. Together they have a son named Mathea.

== Career statistics ==
=== Club ===
As of match played 21 November 2026

Appearances and goals by club, season and competition
Club	Season	League			National cup (Note: Includes Serbian Cup, Belgian Cup, Belarusian Cup, Polish Cup)		Continental		Total	
Club	Season	Division	Apps	Goals	Apps	Goals	Apps	Goals	Apps	Goals
Vojvodina	2011–12	Serbian SuperLiga	1	0	0	0	—		1	0
Vojvodina	2012–13	Serbian SuperLiga	14	0	0	0	0	0	14	0
Vojvodina	2013–14	Serbian SuperLiga	18	1	2	0	3 (Note: Appearance(s) in UEFA Europa League)	0	23	1
Vojvodina	2014–15	Serbian SuperLiga	28	0	2	0	2	0	32	0
Vojvodina	2015–16	Serbian SuperLiga	25	1	2	0	8	0	35	1
Vojvodina	Total		86	2	6	0	13	0	105	2
Genk	2016–17	Belgian Pro League	14	0	1	0	4	0	19	0
Genk	2017–18	Belgian Pro League	18	0	4	0	—		22	0
Genk	2018–19	Belgian Pro League	7	0	2	0	4	0	13	0
Genk	Total		39	0	7	0	8	0	54	0
Oostende (loan)	2018–19	Belgian Pro League	12	1	—		—		12	1
BATE Borisov	2020	Belarusian Premier League	26	1	7	0	1	0	34	1
Jagiellonia	2020–21	Ekstraklasa	9	1	—		—		9	1
Jagiellonia	2021–22	Ekstraklasa	32	0	1	0	—		33	0
Jagiellonia	2022–23	Ekstraklasa	21	0	2	0	—		23	0
Jagiellonia	2023–24	Ekstraklasa	3	0	2	0	—		5	0
Jagiellonia	Total		65	1	5	0	—		70	1
Jagiellonia II	2023–24	III liga, group I	3	0	—		—		3	0
Wisła Płock	2024–25	I liga	27 (Note: Includes two appearances in I liga promotion play-offs)	0	0	0	—		27	0
Wisła Płock	2025–26	Ekstraklasa	9	0	0	0	—		9	0
Wisła Płock	Total		36	0	0	0	—		36	0
Željezničar	2025–26	Bosnian Premier League	7	0	2	0	—		9	0
Željezničar	2026–27	Bosnian Premier League	11	0	1	0	—		12	0
Željezničar	Total		18	0	3	0	—		21	0
Career total			285	5	28	0	22	0	335	5

=== International ===
Appearances and goals by national team and year
National team	Year	Apps	Goals
Bosnia and Herzegovina
Bosnia and Herzegovina	2018	3	0
Bosnia and Herzegovina	2019	1	0
Bosnia and Herzegovina	2020	1	0
Total		5	0

== Honours ==
Vojvodina

- Serbian Cup: 2013–14

Genk

- Belgian Super Cup: 2019

BATE Borisov

- Belarusian Cup: 2019–20

Jagiellonia Białystok

- Ekstraklasa: 2023–24
