= Petar Škuletić =

Serbian footballer

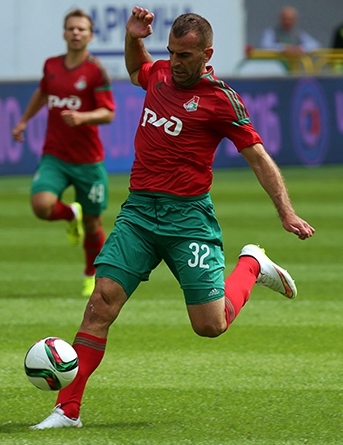
- Škuletić with Lokomotiv Moscow in 2015

Personal information
- Date of birth: 29 June 1990 (age 36)
- Place of birth: Danilovgrad, SR Montenegro, Yugoslavia
- Height: 1.93 m (6 ft 4 in)
- Position: Striker

Youth career
- 2004–2008: Partizan

Senior career*
Years	Team	Apps	(Gls)
2007–2009	Teleoptik	32	(7)
2009–2011	LASK	15	(1)
2011	→ Zeta (loan)	15	(2)
2011–2014	Vojvodina	39	(8)
2013	→ Radnički Niš (loan)	12	(3)
2014–2015	Partizan	28	(21)
2015–2017	Lokomotiv Moscow	39	(10)
2017–2018	Gençlerbirliği	27	(8)
2018–2021	Montpellier	52	(3)
2020	→ Sivasspor (loan)	7	(1)
2021	Sabah	4	(0)
2022	TSC	6	(1)

International career
2006–2007	Serbia U17 (Note: Only official UEFA matches included)	4	(3)
2008–2009	Serbia U19	4	(0)
2015	Serbia	6	(1)
- * Club domestic league appearances and goals

Petar Škuletić (Serbian Cyrillic: Петар Шкулетић; born 29 June 1990) is a Serbian former professional footballer who played as a striker.

== Club career ==
=== Early years ===
At the age of 14, Škuletić joined the youth system of Partizan. He was promoted to their affiliated side Teleoptik during the 2007–08 season. In late May, early June 2008, Škuletić represented Partizan at the Trofeo Quixote, the unofficial youth world championship for clubs, becoming the tournament's top scorer with seven goals. He still failed to secure a first team spot with Partizan, but helped Teleoptik win promotion to the Serbian First League via the playoffs in 2009.

After previously being linked with Celtic and Blackburn Rovers, Škuletić was eventually transferred to Austrian side LASK in the summer of 2009. He made 15 league appearances and scored once in the 2009–10 season. After six months without competitive football, Škuletić was loaned to Montenegrin First League club Zeta in the 2011 winter transfer window.

On 30 August 2011, Škuletić was signed by Vojvodina, in order to replace Nemanja Čović, penning a three-year contract. He made 22 league appearances and scored four goals throughout the 2011–12 season. Škuletić was loaned to Radnički Niš in the second part of the 2012–13 season, before returning to Novi Sad ahead of the start of the 2013–14 campaign.

=== Partizan ===
On 10 January 2014, Škuletić signed a four-year contract with his parent club Partizan and was given the number 32 shirt. He made his competitive debut for the side in a 0–0 away draw with Novi Pazar on 22 February 2014. Škuletić scored his first official goals for Partizan on 8 March 2014, netting a brace in a 5–0 away win over Radnički Kragujevac. He scored another brace in a 5–0 home victory over Voždovac on 10 May 2014. Škuletić scored a total of seven league goals in 13 appearances during the second part of the 2013–14 season.

In the opening match of the 2014–15 season, Škuletić scored the final goal of the game in a UEFA Champions League qualifier versus Faroese champions HB Tórshavn, a 3–0 win for Partizan. He subsequently scored a brace to help his team to a 2–2 home draw with Bulgarian side Ludogorets Razgrad in the third round on 6 August 2014. However, they were eliminated on the away goals rule. Škuletić then scored both of his team's goals in a 2–1 away win over Azerbaijani club Neftçi in the UEFA Europa League play-off round on 28 August 2014. He was also sent off in the game's injury time, causing him to miss the first two games of the group stage due to suspension. On 9 November 2014, Škuletić scored a hat-trick in a 3–0 away win over Spartak Subotica. He managed to score a total of 21 goals in the second half of 2014, breaking the club's record of 20 goals set by Cléo in the fall of 2010.

=== Lokomotiv Moscow ===
On 12 February 2015, it was announced that Škuletić would join Lokomotiv Moscow. He was officially transferred to the Russian club on the following day, penning a four-year contract. The transfer fee was €4 million.

On 3 March 2015, Škuletić made his competitive debut for the club in the Russian Cup quarter-final versus Rubin Kazan, scoring the winning goal in the penalty shootout. He then scored on his league debut on 8 March 2015, to give his new club a 1–0 away win over Rostov.

=== Gençlerbirliği ===
On 31 May 2017, Škuletić signed a two-year contract with Turkish side Gençlerbirliği. He scored his first goal for the club in a 2–3 away loss to Göztepe on 17 September 2017.

=== Montpellier ===
On 13 June 2018, Škuletić joined French side Montpellier.

=== Sabah ===
On 14 September 2021, Škuletić signed for Azerbaijan Premier League side Sabah on a two-year contract. Six weeks later, on 27 October 2021, Škuletić left Sabah by mutual consent.

== International career ==
Although born in Montenegro, Škuletić represented Serbia at under-17 and under-19 level. He was the team's joint top scorer with three goals (a hat-trick in a 5–1 win over Azerbaijan) in the qualification campaign for the 2007 UEFA Under-17 Championship.

In the fall of 2014, after a string of impressive performances at club level, Škuletić again expressed his desire to represent Serbia internationally. He made his senior international debut for Serbia on 29 March 2015, after coming on as a second-half substitute for Adem Ljajić in the 1–2 away loss to Portugal. Škuletić scored his first goal for the national team in a 1–4 friendly loss against the Czech Republic on 13 November 2015.

== Career statistics ==
=== Club ===
As of 1 July 2019

Club	Season	League			Cup		Continental		Total	
Club	Season	Division	Apps	Goals	Apps	Goals	Apps	Goals	Apps	Goals
LASK	2009–10	Austrian Bundesliga	15	1	2	0	—		17	1
Zeta (loan)	2010–11	Montenegrin First League	15	2	2	1	0	0	17	3
Zeta (loan)	2011–12	Montenegrin First League	0	0	0	0	1	0	1	0
Zeta (loan)	Total		15	2	2	1	1	0	18	3
Vojvodina	2011–12	Serbian SuperLiga	22	4	4	0	0	0	26	4
Vojvodina	2012–13	Serbian SuperLiga	3	0	1	0	3	1	7	1
Vojvodina	2013–14	Serbian SuperLiga	14	4	3	1	8	4	25	9
Vojvodina	Total		39	8	8	1	11	5	58	14
Radnički Niš (loan)	2012–13	Serbian SuperLiga	12	3	0	0	—		12	3
Partizan	2013–14	Serbian SuperLiga	13	7	0	0	0	0	13	7
Partizan	2014–15	Serbian SuperLiga	15	14	2	2	10	5	27	21
Partizan	Total		28	21	2	2	10	5	40	28
Lokomotiv Moscow	2014–15	Russian Premier League	11	2	2	1	0	0	13	3
Lokomotiv Moscow	2015–16	Russian Premier League	18	6	2	1	4	0	24	7
Lokomotiv Moscow	2016–17	Russian Premier League	10	2	0	0	—		10	2
Lokomotiv Moscow	Total		39	10	4	2	4	0	47	12
Gençlerbirliği	2017–18	Süper Lig	27	8	4	3	—		31	11
Montpellier	2018–19	Ligue 1	28	1	2	0	—		30	1
Montpellier	2019–20	Ligue 1	5	0	1	0	—		6	0
Montpellier	2020–21	Ligue 1	19	2	4	1	—		23	3
Career total			227	56	29	10	26	10	282	76

=== International ===
National team	Year	Apps	Goals
Serbia	2015	6	1
Total		6	1

== Honours ==
Partizan

- Serbian SuperLiga: 2014–15

Lokomotiv Moscow

- Russian Cup: 2014–15, 2016–17
