= Dragan Radojičić =

Montenegrin football manager and player

Personal information
- Full name: Dragan Radojičić
- Date of birth: 3 June 1970 (age 56)
- Place of birth: Nikšić, SFR Yugoslavia
- Height: 1.80 m (5 ft 11 in)
- Position: Attacking midfielder

Senior career*
Years	Team	Apps	(Gls)
1988–1994	Sutjeska Nikšić	92	(28)
1994–1996	Vojvodina	50	(19)
1996–1997	Las Palmas	12	(3)
1997–1998	Budućnost Podgorica	24	(6)
1999	St. Pölten	13	(6)
1999–2000	Aris	7	(1)
2000	Kavala	21	(2)
2001	Debrecen	24	(10)
Total		243	(75)

Managerial career
- 2008–2009: Vojvodina (assistant)
- 2008: Vojvodina (caretaker)
- 2009–2010: Novi Sad
- 2011: Grbalj
- 2011–2012: Rudar Pljevlja
- 2012–2014: Sutjeska Nikšić
- 2014–2015: Budućnost Podgorica
- 2015–2016: OFK Beograd
- 2016: Rudar Pljevlja
- 2017: Grbalj
- 2018–2019: Proleter Novi Sad
- 2019: Rad
- 2020: Sutjeska Nikšić
- 2021: Kolubara
- 2021–2022: Novi Pazar
- 2022: Vojvodina
- 2022: Radnik Surdulica
- 2024: Smederevo 1924
- * Club domestic league appearances and goals

Dragan Radojičić (Serbian Cyrillic: Драган Радојичић; born 3 June 1970) is a Montenegrin football manager and former player.

== Playing career ==
Radojičić started out at his hometown club Sutjeska Nikšić, making 31 appearances and scoring eight goals in the Yugoslav Second League between 1988 and 1991. He also played for the club in the First League of FR Yugoslavia from 1992 to 1994. Before moving abroad in 1996, Radojičić spent two seasons at Vojvodina. He would later play professionally in Spain, Greece, and Hungary.

== Managerial career ==
After hanging up his boots, Radojičić served as manager of numerous clubs in both Serbia and Montenegro. He began his career at Vojvodina as assistant manager under Dragoljub Bekvalac in the 2008–09 season. After the departure of Bekvalac in October, Radojičić held the role of caretaker manager and continued in the role of assistant manager after the appointment of Ljupko Petrović two months later.

In June 2012, Radojičić was appointed as manager of Montenegrin First League club Sutjeska Nikšić, winning back-to-back championship titles in 2013 and 2014.

== Honours ==
=== Player ===
Debrecen

- Magyar Kupa: 2000–01

=== Manager ===
Sutjeska Nikšić

- Montenegrin First League: 2012–13, 2013–14
