= Aleksandar Mijatović =

Serbian footballer

Personal information
- Full name: Aleksandar Mijatović
- Date of birth: September 20, 1982 (age 44)
- Place of birth: Kraljevo, SFR Yugoslavia
- Height: 1.86 m (6 ft 1 in)
- Position: Defender

Youth career
- Sloga Kraljevo

Senior career*
Years	Team	Apps	(Gls)
2000–2001	Red Star Belgrade	2	(0)
2001	Obilić	9	(0)
2002	Radnički Kragujevac	13	(0)
2002–2004	Rad	31	(0)
2004	Hajduk Beograd	18	(1)
2005–2006	Obilić	23	(0)
2006	Kallithea	13	(1)
2006–2007	Banat Zrenjanin	2	(0)
2007	→ Bežanija (loan)	6	(0)
2007–2008	Napredak Kruševac	25	(0)
2008–2009	Vojvodina	15	(0)
2009–2010	OFK Beograd	15	(0)
2011–2012	Radnički Niš	4	(0)
2012–2013	Kolubara	3	(0)
2013	Novi Sad	9	(0)
2013	Sloga Kraljevo	0	(0)
- * Club domestic league appearances and goals as of 4 September 2013

Aleksandar Mijatović (Serbian Cyrillic: Александар Мијатовић; born September 20, 1982) is a Serbian former professional footballer, and current president of Sloga Kraljevo. He is a son of Serbian accordionist Miša Mijatović.
