= Leandro Montebeler =

Brazilian footballer

Personal information
- Full name: Leandro Rodrigues Montebeler
- Date of birth: 6 April 1984 (age 42)
- Place of birth: Baixo Guandu, Brazil
- Height: 1.72 m (5 ft 8 in)
- Position: Midfielder

Team information
- Current team: Santa Quitéria

Youth career
- 1999-2000: Mirassol

Senior career*
| Years | Team | Apps | (Gls) |
| 2004–2006 | Paysandu | | |
| 2007 | Young Lions | | |
| 2008 | Colatinense | | |
| 2008 | Glória | | |
| 2008–2009 | Vojvodina | 1 | (0) |
| 2009–2010 | Napredak | 15 | (1) |
| 2012 | Adapazarıspor | 10 | (1) |
| 2012 | Águia Negra | | |
| 2013 | Ji-Paraná | 2 | (0) |
| 2014 | Castelo | | |
| 2016–? | Santa Quitéria | | |
- * Club domestic league appearances and goals

Leandro Rodrigues Montebeler (born 6 April 1984) is a Brazilian former professional footballer who played as a midfielder with Santa Quitéria.

Leandro Montebeler started his professional career with Paysandu in his homeland and later went on to play in Singapore, Serbia and Turkey.

He won the Campeonato Sul-Mato-Grossense with Águia Negra in 2012.

In 2013, Leandro Montebeler played with Ji-Paraná in the Campeonato Rondoniense.

He played with Vojvodina and Napredak Kruševac in the Serbian SuperLiga. He also had a spell in Turkey with Adapazarıspor. Then he returned to Brazil where he played, since 2012 onwards, with Águia Negra, Ji-Paraná, Castelo and Santa Quitéria.
