= Slobodan Novaković =

Serbian footballer

Personal information
- Date of birth: 15 October 1986 (age 40)
- Place of birth: Subotica, SFR Yugoslavia
- Height: 1.74 m (5 ft 9 in)
- Position: Midfielder

Senior career*
Years	Team	Apps	(Gls)
2004–2007	Vojvodina	0	(0)
2004–2005	→ Kabel (loan)	-	(-)
2005–2006	→ Sloga Temerin (loan)	30	(1)
2006–2009	Novi Sad	53	(3)
2007–2008	→ Mladost Bački Jarak (loan)	13	(1)
2009–2012	Vojvodina	23	(0)
2010–2011	→ Hajduk Kula (loan)	8	(0)
2012–2014	Spartak Subotica	39	(8)
2014–2015	Vojvodina	21	(1)
2015	Proleter Novi Sad	12	(4)
2016	Spartak Subotica	6	(0)
2016–2017	BSC Old Boys	8	(1)
2017–2020	Proleter Novi Sad	88	(20)
2020–	Kabel	82	(19)
- * Club domestic league appearances and goals as of 11 November 2024

Slobodan Novaković (Serbian Cyrillic: Слободан Новаковић; born 15 October 1986) is a Serbian footballer.
