= Miodrag Stošić =

Serbian footballer

Personal information
- Full name: Miodrag Stošić
- Date of birth: 25 February 1981 (age 45)
- Place of birth: Loznica, SFR Yugoslavia
- Height: 1.83 m (6 ft 0 in)
- Position: Defender

Senior career*
Years	Team	Apps	(Gls)
2001–2003	Loznica	57	(6)
2003–2005	Radnički Obrenovac	47	(1)
2005–2009	Vojvodina	102	(1)
2009–2012	Nîmes	91	(6)
2013–2014	Laval	21	(0)
2014	Voždovac	4	(0)
Total		322	(14)
- * Club domestic league appearances and goals as of 1 March 2015

Miodrag Stošić (Serbian Cyrillic: Миодраг Стошић; born 25 February 1981) is a Serbian retired footballer who played as a defender.

== Career ==
Stošić represented Loznica, Radnički Obrenovac and Vojvodina in his homeland, before moving to France in the summer of 2009. He stayed the following five years in the country, playing for Nîmes and Laval, before returning to Serbia by joining Voždovac in the summer of 2014.
