= Aleksandar Popović (footballer, born 1983) =

Austrian-Serbian footballer

Personal information
- Full name: Aleksandar Popović
- Date of birth: 2 November 1983 (age 43)
- Place of birth: Klagenfurt, Austria
- Height: 1.80 m (5 ft 11 in)
- Position: Midfielder

Youth career
- BSV Bad Bleiberg

Senior career*
Years	Team	Apps	(Gls)
2001–2002	Red Star Belgrade	0	(0)
2001–2002	→ Jedinstvo Ub (loan)	5	(0)
2002–2003	BSV Bad Bleiberg	18	(0)
2003–2005	Olimpija Ljubljana	25	(1)
2005–2009	Vojvodina	51	(2)
2009–2010	Kavala	7	(0)
2010–XXXX	FK Beograd		
- * Club domestic league appearances and goals

Aleksandar Popović (Serbian Cyrillic: Александар Поповић, born 2 November 1983) is a retired Austrian-Serbian football midfielder who plays for FK Beograd.

== Career ==
He was born in Klagenfurt, Austria. He started his career playing with BSV Bad Bleiberg. In 2001, he moved to FR Yugoslavia and joined Serbian giants red Star Belgrade, however he spent most time on loan at FK Jedinstvo Ub. Afterwards, he returned to Austria and then played one season, already as senior, at his previous club, BSV Bad Bleiberg.

In 2003, he moved abroad again, this time just crossing the border and joining Slovenian top-league side Olimpija Ljubljana, playing with them the seasons 2003–04 and 2004–05.

His fine performances in SLovenian PrvaLiga made interest in the region grow, and he returned to Serbia and signed with FK Vojvodina. Popović became the team captain in Serbian SuperLiga club FK Vojvodina, and in summer 2009, he moved to Super League Greece to play in Kavala F.C. in the Greek Super League. In 2010, he returned again to Serbia and played with FK Beograd in third-tier, the Serbian League Belgrade.
