= Darko Puškarić =

Serbian footballer

Personal information
- Full name: Darko Puškarić
- Date of birth: 13 July 1985 (age 41)
- Place of birth: Novi Sad, SR Serbia, SFR Yugoslavia
- Height: 1.83 m (6 ft 0 in)
- Position: Defender

Senior career*
Years	Team	Apps	(Gls)
2003–2009	Novi Sad	124	(3)
2003–2004	→ Šajkaš Kovilj (loan)	24	(2)
2009–2013	Spartak Subotica	98	(6)
2014–2017	Vojvodina	62	(5)
2017–2023	Čukarički	98	(4)
Total		406	(20)
- * Club domestic league appearances and goals as of 9 May 2023

Darko Puškarić (Serbian Cyrillic: Дарко Пушкарић; born 13 July 1985) is a Serbian professional footballer who plays as a defender.

== Career ==
Puškarić started his senior career at Novi Sad in the Second League of Serbia and Montenegro. He also spent some time on loan with Serbian League Vojvodina side Šajkaš Kovilj during the 2003–04 and 2004–05 seasons.

In the summer of 2009, Puškarić moved to newly promoted Serbian SuperLiga club Spartak Subotica. He switched to Vojvodina in the 2014 winter transfer window, helping them win the Serbian Cup later that year. In the summer of 2017, Puškarić signed with Čukarički.

== Honours ==
Vojvodina

- Serbian Cup: 2013–14
