= Nemanja Sekulić =

Montenegrin footballer

Personal information
- Full name: Nemanja Sekulić
- Date of birth: 29 March 1994 (age 32)
- Place of birth: Podgorica, FR Yugoslavia
- Height: 1.80 m (5 ft 11 in)
- Position: Defensive midfielder

Team information
- Current team: OFK Petrovac
- Number: 23

Youth career
- Red Star Belgrade
- Vojvodina

Senior career*
Years	Team	Apps	(Gls)
2012–2013	Vojvodina	2	(0)
2014	Rudar Pljevlja	7	(0)
2015	Petrovac	1	(0)
2015	Bratstvo	16	(0)
2016–2017	Zeta	42	(1)
2018	Kom	16	(1)
2018	Rudar Pljevlja	17	(0)
2019–2020	Zeta	45	(3)
2020-2023	Budućnost	16	(0)
2023	Kom Podgorica	17	(1)
2024-	OFK Petrovac	3	(0)

International career^{‡}
2019–	Montenegro	1	(0)
- * Club domestic league appearances and goals as of 29 May 2024 ‡ National team caps and goals as of 11 October 2019

Nemanja Sekulić (Serbian Cyrillic: Немања Секулић; born 29 March 1994) is a Montenegrin football midfielder who plays for OFK Petrovac.

== International career ==
He made his Montenegro national football team debut on 11 October 2019 in a Euro 2020 qualifier against Bulgaria. He started the game and played the whole match.
