= Aleksandar Kesić =

Serbian footballer

Personal information
- Full name: Aleksandar Kesić
- Date of birth: 18 August 1987 (age 39)
- Place of birth: Apatin, SFR Yugoslavia
- Height: 1.87 m (6 ft 1 1/2 in)
- Position: Goalkeeper

Youth career
- Mladost Apatin

Senior career*
Years	Team	Apps	(Gls)
2005–2007	Mladost Apatin	3	(0)
2005–2006	→ Big Bull Bačinci (loan)	24	(0)
2006–2007	→ Palić (loan)	21	(0)
2007–2011	Vojvodina	12	(0)
2007–2008	→ Palić (loan)	10	(0)
2011–2012	Rad	7	(0)
2012–2013	Vojvodina	0	(0)
2013	→ Radnički Niš (loan)	12	(0)
2013–2015	Radnički Niš	29	(0)
2016–2017	Spartak Subotica	0	(0)

International career
2003–2004	Serbia and Montenegro U17 (Note: Only official UEFA matches included)	6	(0)
2006	Serbia and Montenegro U19	2	(0)
2007	Serbia U21	1	(0)
- * Club domestic league appearances and goals as of 20 August 2018

Aleksandar Kesić (Serbian Cyrillic: Александар Кесић; born 18 August 1987) is a Serbian professional footballer who plays as a goalkeeper.

== Club career ==
During his footballing career, Kesić played for Mladost Apatin, Vojvodina, Rad, Radnički Niš and Spartak Subotica in the Serbian SuperLiga. He had previously gained experience at Big Bull Bačinci and Palić in the Serbian League Vojvodina.

== International career ==
Kesić represented Serbia at the 2007 UEFA European Under-21 Championship. He played one match during the tournament, in a 2–0 loss against England in Group B. However, Serbia progressed to the semi-finals and later went on to finish as runners-up of the competition.
