= Srđan Žakula =

Serbian footballer

Personal information
- Date of birth: 22 March 1979 (age 47)
- Place of birth: Korenica, SFR Yugoslavia
- Height: 1.91 m (6 ft 3 in)
- Position: Goalkeeper

Youth career
- Partizan Korenica
- Mladost Apatin

Senior career*
| Years | Team | Apps | (Gls) |
| 1997–2007 | Mladost Apatin | 150 | (0) |
| 2007–2008 | Unirea Urziceni | 1 | (0) |
| 2009 | Hajduk Kula | 5 | (0) |
| 2010–2012 | Radnički Sombor | 79 | (0) |
| 2012–2016 | Vojvodina | 29 | (0) |
| 2016 | Omladinac Deronje | | |
| 2017 | Radnički Šid | 13 | (0) |
| Total | | 277 | (0) |

Managerial career
- 2018–2021: Spartak Subotica (Goalkeeping coach)
- 2021–: Vojvodina (Goalkeeping coach)
- * Club domestic league appearances and goals

Srđan Žakula (Serbian Cyrillic: Срђан Жакула; born 22 March 1979) is a Serbian retired football player. He played as a goalkeeper for Radnički Šid last, and then retired and became goalkeeping coach.

== Honours ==
Vojvodina

- Serbian Cup: 2013–14
