= Stefan Nikolić (footballer, born 1994) =

Serbian footballer

Personal information
- Full name: Stefan Nikolić
- Date of birth: 14 March 1994 (age 32)
- Place of birth: Belgrade, FR Yugoslavia
- Height: 1.80 m (5 ft 11 in)
- Position: Right-back

Youth career
- Red Star Belgrade
- –2013: Vojvodina

Senior career*
Years	Team	Apps	(Gls)
2013	Mladost Podgorica	2	(0)
2014–2015	Vojvodina	3	(0)
2015–2017	OFK Bačka	56	(0)
2018–2020	Krupa	26	(0)
- * Club domestic league appearances and goals as of 2 August 2020

Stefan Nikolić (Serbian Cyrillic: Стефан Николић; born 14 March 1994) is a Serbian professional footballer who plays as a right-back.

== Career ==
=== Mladost Podgorica ===
Nikolić is a product of the Red Star Belgrade and Vojvodina academy. Although he played successfully for the youth team's first eleven on the right-back position, Nikolić failed to secure a first team contract. He signed his first professional contract with Montenegrin side Mladost Podgorica. However, he was released after only 6 months at the club, appearing in only two league matches.

=== Vojvodina ===
In a bizarre twist of events, Nikolić was invited to a trial at Vojvodina, due to the club's new policy to focus on youth players from its own academy. He secured a two-year deal at his old club. He made his debut for Vojvodina on 13 April 2014, under manager Branko Babić, in a 1–0 home loss against Rad. While at Vojvodina, Nikolić won the 2013–14 Serbian Cup. He was released from the club at the end of the 2014–15 season.

=== OFK Bačka ===
In early July 2015, Nikolić signed with OFK Bačka on a free transfer. He left Bačka in late 2017.

=== Krupa ===
In March 2018, Nikolić signed a contract with Bosnian Premier League club Krupa. He was part of the Krupa team that played in the 2017–18 Bosnian Cup final against Željezničar, losing both final matches. Nikolić got relegated with Krupa back to the First League of RS in the 2018–19 season, but got promoted back to the Bosnian Premier League in the next season, though after the season was ended abruptly due to the COVID-19 pandemic in Bosnia and Herzegovina, after which, by default, Krupa were crowned league champions and got promoted. He terminated his contract with the club on 19 December 2020.

== Honours ==
Vojvodina

- Serbian Cup: 2013–14

Krupa

- First League of RS: 2019–20
