= Enver Alivodić =

Serbian footballer (born 1984)

Personal information
- Full name: Enver Alivodić
- Date of birth: 27 December 1984 (age 41)
- Place of birth: Novi Pazar, SFR Yugoslavia
- Height: 1.78 m (5 ft 10 in)
- Positions: Midfielder; forward

Youth career
- Novi Pazar

Senior career*
Years	Team	Apps	(Gls)
2001–2004	Novi Pazar	45	(6)
2002	→ Radnički Niš (loan)	4	(0)
2004–2007	Čukarički	89	(5)
2007–2008	Novi Pazar	37	(7)
2009–2011	BSK Borča	72	(8)
2011–2012	EN Paralimni	29	(0)
2012	Novi Pazar	15	(5)
2013–2014	Vojvodina	53	(13)
2015–2016	Newcastle Jets	35	(4)
2016	Novi Pazar	19	(6)
2017	Napredak Kruševac	38	(9)
2018	Apollon Smyrnis	2	(0)
2018–2019	Napredak Kruševac	33	(3)
2019–2020	Novi Pazar	17	(2)

International career
2017	Serbia	1	(0)
- * Club domestic league appearances and goals

Enver Alivodić (Serbian Cyrillic: Енвер Аливодић; born 27 December 1984) is a Serbian retired footballer who played as a midfielder.

== Club career ==
=== Early years ===
Alivodić started out at his hometown club Novi Pazar, making his senior debuts in 2001. He also spent some time on loan at Radnički Niš (2002), before moving to Čukarički in the summer of 2004. In his debut season at the club, Alivodić scored three goals from 27 appearances in the top flight, but failed to save them from relegation. He remained with Čukarički for two more years, playing regularly in the second tier, before returning to his parent club.

In the 2009 winter transfer window, Alivodić was transferred to fellow Serbian First League side BSK Borča, helping them win promotion to the Serbian SuperLiga. He scored a hat-trick in a 4–0 home league win over Inđija on 9 April 2011.

In the summer of 2011, Alivodić moved abroad to play for Cypriot club Enosis Neon Paralimni. He was their regular member in the 2011–12 season, helping them avoid relegation from the top flight. Shortly after, Alivodić moved back to Novi Pazar.

=== Vojvodina ===
On 18 January 2013, Alivodić signed with Vojvodina on a two-year contract. He made his debut for the club on 27 February, playing the full 90 minutes in a 2–1 away league win against Smederevo. Three days later, on 2 March, Alivodić netted his first goal for the side, scoring the opener in an eventual 2–1 home win over Spartak Subotica. He also found the back of the net in a 2–1 league win over Partizan on 7 April. Subsequently, Alivodić took part in the final of the 2012–13 Serbian Cup, as Vojvodina lost 0–1 to Jagodina. He later scored a goal in a 3–0 win over Red Star Belgrade in the last fixture of the 2012–13 Serbian SuperLiga, as the team finished in third place.

On 11 July 2013, Alivodić netted his first goal of the season in a 3–2 home win over Maltese side Hibernians in the return leg of the 2013–14 UEFA Europa League first qualifying round. He subsequently scored in the second leg of the following round, as Vojvodina celebrated a 3–1 win away against Budapest Honvéd in Hungary. In the 2013–14 Serbian SuperLiga, Alivodić was the team's joint top scorer with five goals. He also scored the opener against Jagodina in the final of the 2013–14 Serbian Cup, as Vojvodina won the game 2–0.

During his stay at the Stadion Karađorđe, Alivodić collected 73 appearances and netted 19 goals in all competitions.

=== Newcastle Jets ===
In February 2015, Alivodić move abroad for the second time and joined A-League club Newcastle Jets. He made his debut for the side in a 0–0 home draw with Central Coast Mariners, coming on as a substitute for Radovan Pavicevic. On 21 March 2015, Alivodić scored his first goal for the Jets, opening the scoring in his team's 2–1 win away against Western Sydney. He eventually signed a one-year contract extension with the club in April 2015. In his second season at Newcastle, Alivodić only missed one game in the league, collecting 26 appearances and scoring two goals in the process.

=== Later years ===
In July 2016, Alivodić returned to Novi Pazar, being named captain. He was the team's top scorer in the first half of the 2016–17 Serbian SuperLiga, netting six goals in 19 games. In January 2017, Alivodić signed a six-month deal with fellow SuperLiga club Napredak Kruševac. He eventually stayed until the end of the year.

In early 2018, Alivodić moved abroad for the third time and joined Greek club Apollon Smyrnis. He appeared in just two games before returning to Napredak Kruševac for the 2018–19 season. In August 2019, Alivodić rejoined his parent club Novi Pazar after almost three years.

After 2019/2020 season Alivodić retired from football at age 35.

After the retirement, Alivodić moved to Denmark with his family, because his wife and children had Danish passports, since his wife was raised in the country. In 2020, Alivodić played for Danish amateur club Horsens fS, while he moved to another Danish amateur club, Horsens United, in March 2021.

== International career ==
On 29 January 2017, Alivodić made his international debut for Serbia, coming on as a second-half substitute for Saša Jovanović in a goalless draw against the United States in San Diego. He thus became the oldest player to make his debut for Serbia at 32 years, one month, and two days.

== Statistics ==
=== Club ===
Club	Season	League		Cup		Continental		Total	
Club	Season	Apps	Goals	Apps	Goals	Apps	Goals	Apps	Goals
Novi Pazar	2007–08	20	3	0	0	—		20	3
Novi Pazar	2008–09	17	4	1	0	—		18	4
Novi Pazar	Total	37	7	1	0	—		38	7
BSK Borča	2008–09	15	2	0	0	—		15	2
BSK Borča	2009–10	29	2			—		29	2
BSK Borča	2010–11	28	4	1	0	—		29	4
BSK Borča	Total	72	8	1	0	—		73	8
Enosis Neon Paralimni	2011–12	29	0			—		29	0
Novi Pazar	2012–13	15	5	2	1	—		17	6
Vojvodina	2012–13	13	5	3	0	—		16	5
Vojvodina	2013–14	28	5	6	2	8	2	42	9
Vojvodina	2014–15	12	3	1	1	2	1	15	5
Vojvodina	Total	53	13	10	3	10	3	73	19
Newcastle Jets	2014–15	9	2	0	0	—		9	2
Newcastle Jets	2015–16	26	2	1	0	—		27	2
Newcastle Jets	Total	35	4	1	0	—		36	4
Novi Pazar	2016–17	19	6	1	0	—		20	6
Napredak Kruševac	2016–17	16	2	0	0	—		16	2
Napredak Kruševac	2017–18	22	7	2	2	—		24	9
Napredak Kruševac	Total	38	9	2	2	—		40	11
Apollon Smyrnis	2017–18	2	0	0	0	—		2	0
Napredak Kruševac	2018–19	33	3	2	1	—		35	4
Career total		333	55	20	7	10	3	363	65

=== International ===
National team	Year	Apps	Goals
Serbia	2017	1	0
Total		1	0

== Honours ==
=== Club ===
BSK Borča

- Serbian First League: 2008–09

Vojvodina

- Serbian Cup: 2013–14
