= Marko Kordić =

Montenegrin footballer

Personal information
- Full name: Marko Kordić
- Date of birth: 22 February 1995 (age 31)
- Place of birth: Podgorica, FR Yugoslavia
- Height: 1.90 m (6 ft 3 in)
- Position: Goalkeeper

Team information
- Current team: Petrovac
- Number: 25

Youth career
- Vojvodina

Senior career*
Years	Team	Apps	(Gls)
2012–2017	Vojvodina	44	(0)
2013	→ Bačka (loan)	0	(0)
2018–2019	Grbalj	49	(0)
2019	Bokelj	16	(0)
2020	Napredak Kruševac	9	(0)
2020–2023	Iskra Danilovgrad	102	(0)
2023–	Petrovac	101	(1)

International career
2011	Montenegro U17	3	(0)
2013	Montenegro U19	3	(0)
2015–2016	Montenegro U21	7	(0)
- * Club domestic league appearances and goals as of 17 June 2026

Marko Kordić (Serbian Cyrillic: Марко Кордић; born 22 February 1995) is a Montenegrin footballer who plays as a goalkeeper for OFK Petrovac.

== Club career ==
=== Vojvodina ===
Kordić joined Vojvodina's first team for season 2011–12, as a youth squad member. He was loaned to Bačka at the beginning of the 2013–14 season, but he returned to Vojvodina in short time, because of deficit of goalkeepers. In winter break off-season, he injured Cruciate ligaments and ended that season. After recovery, he regularly trained with other players in the 2014–15 season. Kordić made solid performances in winter break off-season and confirmed full recovery. He made his professional debut for Vojvodina in away match against OFK Beograd in 16th round of Serbian SuperLiga played on 21 February 2015 at the Omladinski Stadium and ended with draw result, 0:0.
