= Goran Smiljanić =

Serbian footballer

Personal information
- Date of birth: 31 January 1990 (age 36)
- Place of birth: Novi Sad, SR Serbia, Yugoslavia
- Height: 1.73 m (5 ft 8 in)
- Position: Right-back

Team information
- Current team: Jadran Golubinci

Youth career
- Vojvodina

Senior career*
Years	Team	Apps	(Gls)
2007–2013	Vojvodina	47	(1)
2008	→ Inđija (loan)	8	(0)
2013–2014	Bežanija	15	(0)
2014–2015	Inđija	24	(1)
2015–2016	Kolubara	7	(0)
2016	Inđija	5	(0)
2016	Bačka BP	11	(0)
2017	Hajduk Beška		
2017–2018	Bežanija	26	(1)
2018–2019	Inđija	18	(5)
2019–2020	Rad	26	(3)
2020	Proleter Novi Sad	5	(0)
2020–2021	Budućnost Dobanovci	28	(2)
2021–2022	Borac Sajkas		
2022	Radnički Beograd	14	(0)
2023	Železničar Inđija		
2023–2024	Hajduk Beška		
2025–	Jadran Golubinci		

International career
2006–2007	Serbia U17	6	(1)
- * Club domestic league appearances and goals as of 19:52, 21 May 2023 (UTC)

Goran Smiljanić (Serbian Cyrillic: Горан Смиљанић; born 31 January 1990) is a Serbian footballer who plays for Jadran Golubinci.
