= Igor Đurić (Serbian footballer) =

Serbian footballer

Personal information
- Full name: Igor Đurić
- Date of birth: 22 February 1985 (age 41)
- Place of birth: Novi Sad, SFR Yugoslavia
- Height: 1.92 m (6 ft 4 in)
- Position: Centre-back

Youth career
- Partizan
- Inđija

Senior career*
Years	Team	Apps	(Gls)
2003–2005	Srem	42	(2)
2005–2009	Vojvodina	96	(4)
2009–2011	Heerenveen	5	(0)
2011–2012	Sharjah	7	(0)
2012–2015	Vojvodina	42	(2)
2015	→ Rad (loan)	12	(2)
2015	Karşıyaka	11	(0)
2016–2017	Bačka	14	(0)
Total		229	(10)

International career
2008–2009	Serbia	4	(0)

Managerial career
- 2018: Cement Beočin (assistant)
- * Club domestic league appearances and goals

Igor Đurić (Serbian Cyrillic: Игор Ђурић; born 22 February 1985) is a Serbian retired footballer who played as a defender.

== Club career ==
On 23 June 2009, the SC Heerenveen agreed a deal with FK Vojvodina that saw the 24-year-old central defender sign a four-year contract until 30 June 2013 with the Eredivisie side. He left Heerenveen by mutual consent end of August 2011 and signed at Emirati club Sharjah in November. On 28 June 2012 he signed his second contract with Novi Sad's FK Vojvodina.

== International career ==
Đurić was a Serbia and Montenegro U19 international during the 2004 UEFA European Under-19 Championship qualifying round.

Đurić made his debut for the senior side in November 2008, a friendly match 6–1 Bulgaria. The then played three more friendlies, including a 4 nation-tournament hosted by Cyprus.

== Honours ==
Vojvodina

- Serbian Cup runner-up: 2006–07

Heerenveen

- Johan Cruyff Shield runner-up: 2009
