= Vladan Pavlović =

Serbian footballer

Personal information
- Date of birth: 24 February 1984 (age 42)
- Place of birth: Surdulica, SFR Yugoslavia
- Height: 1.81 m (5 ft 11 1/2 in)
- Positions: Left-back; left midfielder

Team information
- Current team: Radnik Surdulica (assistant coach)

Senior career*
Years	Team	Apps	(Gls)
2002–2005	Obilić	33	(1)
2003–2004	→ Mladi Obilić (loan)	25	(2)
2005–2006	Rad	2	(0)
2005–2008	Bežanija	51	(3)
2008–2013	Vojvodina	65	(0)
2009–2010	→ Javor Ivanjica (loan)	30	(1)
2013–2015	Radnički Niš	53	(2)
2015–2020	Radnik Surdulica	92	(3)
Total		351	(12)

Managerial career
- 2021–: Radnik Surdulica (assistant)
- * Club domestic league appearances and goals

Vladan Pavlović (Serbian Cyrillic: Bлaдaн Пaвлoвић; born 24 February 1984) is a Serbian football coach and a former defender. He is an assistant coach for Radnik Surdulica.

He was born in Surdulica and he played for FK Obilić, FK Rad and FK Bežanija, before moving to FK Vojvodina. In the 2009–10 he was loaned to FK Javor.
