= Aboubakar Oumarou =

Cameroonian footballer

Personal information
- Date of birth: 4 January 1987 (age 39)
- Place of birth: Yaoundé, Cameroon
- Height: 1.82 m (6 ft 0 in)
- Position: Forward

Senior career*
Years	Team	Apps	(Gls)
2006	Yanbian	4	(0)
2007–2008	Changsha Ginde	52	(7)
2008–2009	Red Star Belgrade	13	(2)
2009–2010	OFK Beograd	23	(3)
2010–2013	Vojvodina	86	(31)
2013–2015	Waasland-Beveren	39	(3)
2015–2016	Partizan	13	(3)
2016–2018	Shenzhen FC	62	(24)
2018–2019	Al-Qadsiah	11	(1)
2020	Napredak Kruševac	4	(0)
Total		307	(74)

International career
2012–2015	Cameroon	3	(0)
- * Club domestic league appearances and goals

Aboubakar Oumarou (born 4 January 1987) is a Cameroonian former professional footballer who played as a forward. Having started his professional career in China, he played in five different Serbian clubs. Oumarou was capped three times by the Cameroon national team.

== Club career ==
=== Early career ===
Oumarou started his professional career in China with Yanbian before moving to Changsha Ginde where he played in the 2007 and 2008 Chinese Super League. In the 2009 winter transfer window, Milan Živadinović discovered Oumarou in China and after that, he was sold to the Serbian club Red Star Belgrade. Oumarou stayed there for only six months before he signed for another city club OFK Beograd, for the 2009–10 season.

=== Vojvodina ===
After playing an entire season with OFK, Oumarou moved to FK Vojvodina in the summer of 2010. In Vojvodina, he was elected three times in a row as Vojvodina Supporters' Player of the Year for the 2010–11, 2011–12 and 2012–13 seasons by the unofficial club fansite fkvojvodina.com.

His first match of the 2012–13 season was against Lithuanian club Sūduva on 19 July 2012, in the second qualifying round for UEFA Europa League. In that game, he scored a goal in the last minute of the match in a 1–1 home draw. A week later he also scored against Sūduva and enrolled assists in the away victory 4–0. A week later after winning against Suduva 4–0, he scored a goal against the Rapid Wien and so helped the Vojvodina to win rapid and closer to the play-off of the UEFA Europa League. His first goal of the new season of Serbian SuperLiga scored on 28 October 2012 against Javor. Oumarou scored the goal in the 77th minute of the match in a penalty shootout. On 1 December 2012, he scored twice against his former club Red Star Belgrade.

On 31 January 2013, thanks to his much-needed contribution to the club over the years, Oumarou signed a new one-year contract with Vojvodina.

=== Waasland-Beveren ===
On 9 August 2013, Oumarou signed a two-year deal with Belgian side Waasland-Beveren. On 18 August 2013, he has made his debut for Waasland-Beveren against Anderlecht and he spent 45 minutes on the pitch. On 15 February 2014, in 78th minute he scored his first goal for Waasland-Beveren against OH Leuven in a 3–1 home win.

=== Partizan ===
On 30 June 2015, Oumarou signed a two-year contract with Partizan. He made his official debut for the club in the first leg of the UEFA Champions League second qualifying round against Dila Gori on 14 July 2015. In the second leg of that round, Oumarou scored a goal in the 2–0 victory.

On 17 September 2015, Oumarou scored twice in a 3–2 home victory over Dutch club AZ in the opening round of the Europa League group stage, marking the 400th goal of Partizan in European competitions. Oumarou was declared as a player of the first round of the Europa League, becoming the first player from the Serbian club to be the player of the round in European competitions. On 1 October 2015, Oumarou was injured 22 minutes into the match and had to leave the game against Augsburg. He had missed the match against Athletic Bilbao in the third round of the group stage of the Europa League on 22 October 2015. On 5 November 2015, Oumarou has scored an equalizer at San Mamés in the defeat of his team 's 5–1. On 26 November 2015, Oumarou scored the equalizer a header after a cross from Nikola Ninković, and in 89 minutes he was after a fantastic solo raid assisted to Andrija Živković score a winning goal in 1–2 away victory against AZ. earning Abubakar man of the match honors against AZ.

=== Shenzhen FC ===
On 25 February 2016, Aboubakar signed a two-year deal with China League One side Shenzhen FC. After scoring 24 goals in 62 appearances, he left the club in July 2018 due to the limit of the foreign player slots.

== International career ==
Oumarou got his first call-up from the national team of Cameroon for a 2013 African Cup of Nations qualifier on 8 September 2012 against Cape Verde. He made his debut against Cape Verde as a substitute for Yannick N'Djeng in the 67th minute.

Already having 2 caps for Cameroon, Oumarou was again called again in November 2015, for the 2018 FIFA World Cup qualifiers against Niger on 13 and 17 November 2015.

== Career statistics ==
=== Club ===
Appearances and goals by club, season and competition
Club	Season	League			Cup		Continental		Total	
Club	Season	Division	Apps	Goals	Apps	Goals	Apps	Goals	Apps	Goals
Yanbian	2006	China League One	4	0	0	0	—		4	0
Changsha Ginde	2007	Chinese Super League	27	2	0	0	—		27	2
Changsha Ginde	2008	Chinese Super League	25	5	0	0	—		25	5
Changsha Ginde	Total		52	7	0	0	—		52	7
Red Star Belgrade	2008–09	Serbian SuperLiga	13	2	2	0	0	0	15	2
OFK Beograd	2009–10	Serbian SuperLiga	23	3	2	0	—		25	3
Vojvodina	2010–11	Serbian SuperLiga	27	11	4	2	—		31	13
Vojvodina	2011–12	Serbian SuperLiga	30	9	5	1	2	1	37	11
Vojvodina	2012–13	Serbian SuperLiga	29	11	6	3	4	3	39	17
Vojvodina	2013–14	Serbian SuperLiga	0	0	0	0	4	3	4	3
Vojvodina	Total		86	31	15	6	10	7	111	44
Waasland-Beveren	2013–14	Belgian Pro League	24	3	1	1	—		25	4
Waasland-Beveren	2014–15	Belgian Pro League	15	0	0	0	—		15	0
Waasland-Beveren	Total		39	3	1	1	—		40	4
Partizan	2015–16	Serbian SuperLiga	13	3	2	1	11	6	26	10
Shenzhen FC	2016	China League One	28	11	0	0	—		28	11
Shenzhen FC	2017	China League One	28	12	0	0	—		28	12
Shenzhen FC	2018	China League One	6	1	0	0	—		6	1
Shenzhen FC	Total		62	24	0	0	—		62	24
Al Qadsiah	2018–19	Saudi Pro League	11	1	0	0	—		11	1
Napredak Kruševac	2019–20	Serbian SuperLiga	1	0	0	0	—		1	0
Napredak Kruševac	2020–21	Serbian SuperLiga	3	0	0	0	—		3	0
Napredak Kruševac	Total		4	0	0	0	—		4	0
Career total			307	74	22	8	21	13	350	95

=== International ===
Appearances and goals by national team and year
National team	Year	Apps	Goals
Cameroon	2012	1	0
Cameroon	2013	1	0
Cameroon	2014	0	0
Cameroon	2015	1	0
Total		3	0

== Honours ==
Individual

- Serbian SuperLiga Team of the Year: 2010–11, 2012–13 (with Vojvodina)
- Serbian Cup Top Scorer: 2008–09
