= Vuk Mitošević =

Serbian footballer

Personal information
- Date of birth: 12 February 1991 (age 35)
- Place of birth: Novi Sad, SFR Yugoslavia
- Height: 1.80 m (5 ft 11 in)
- Position: Midfielder

Youth career
- 1999–2009: Vojvodina

Senior career*
Years	Team	Apps	(Gls)
2009–2013	Vojvodina	51	(2)
2009	→ Palić (loan)	10	(2)
2013–2016	Jagodina	51	(0)
2015	→ Kaisar (loan)	23	(0)
2016	Aktobe	13	(0)
2017	Javor Ivanjica	33	(2)
2017–2018	Radnik Surdulica	14	(0)
2018–2019	Kisvárda	8	(0)
2019	Vojvodina	14	(1)
2019–2021	Radnik Surdulica	39	(5)
2021	Shakhter Karagandy	18	(0)
2022–2023	Radnik Surdulica	31	(2)
2024	Mladost Novi Sad	14	(0)
2024	Smederevo 1924	16	(0)

International career
2007–2008	Serbia U17	9	(0)
2008–2010	Serbia U19	12	(1)
2011–2012	Serbia U21	6	(0)
- * Club domestic league appearances and goals as of 31 December 2024

Vuk Mitošević (Serbian Cyrillic: Вук Митошевић; born 12 February 1991) is a Serbian professional footballer who plays as a midfielder.
