= FK Hajduk Beograd =

Serbian football club

Hajduk Beograd
- Full name: Fudbalski Klub Hajduk Beograd
- Nickname: Beli golubovi (The White Pigeons)
- Founded: 1937; 89 years ago
- Ground: Stadion FK Hajduk
- Capacity: 1,000
- League: Belgrade First League
- 2024–25: Belgrade First League, 9th of 14
Home colours	Away colours

FK Hajduk Beograd (Serbian Cyrillic: ФК Хајдук Београд) is a football club based in Lion, Belgrade, Serbia. They compete in the Belgrade First League, the fifth tier of the national league system. The club is often referred to as Hajduk Lion, though this has never been its official name.

== History ==
After the breakup of Yugoslavia, the club started climbing up the league pyramid by winning the Belgrade Zone League in the 1992–93 season. They subsequently finished as champions of the Serbian League North in 1993–94 and reached the Second League of FR Yugoslavia. In the NATO bombing-suspended 1998–99 season, the club placed second in Group East and gained promotion to the First League of FR Yugoslavia. However, they were immediately relegated from the top flight in their debut season, finishing 18th out of 21.

At the beginning of the new millennium, the club played in the Second League and managed to top Group East in the 2003–04 season to earn promotion to the First League of Serbia and Montenegro. They finished bottom of the table in their comeback appearance in the top flight, but were administratively relegated to the third tier. After winning the 2006–07 Serbian League Belgrade title, the club spent two seasons in the Serbian First League, before suffering relegation back to the third tier. They surprisingly reached the quarter-finals of the 2008–09 Serbian Cup after eliminating Vojvodina on penalties, but were subsequently eliminated by Partizan.

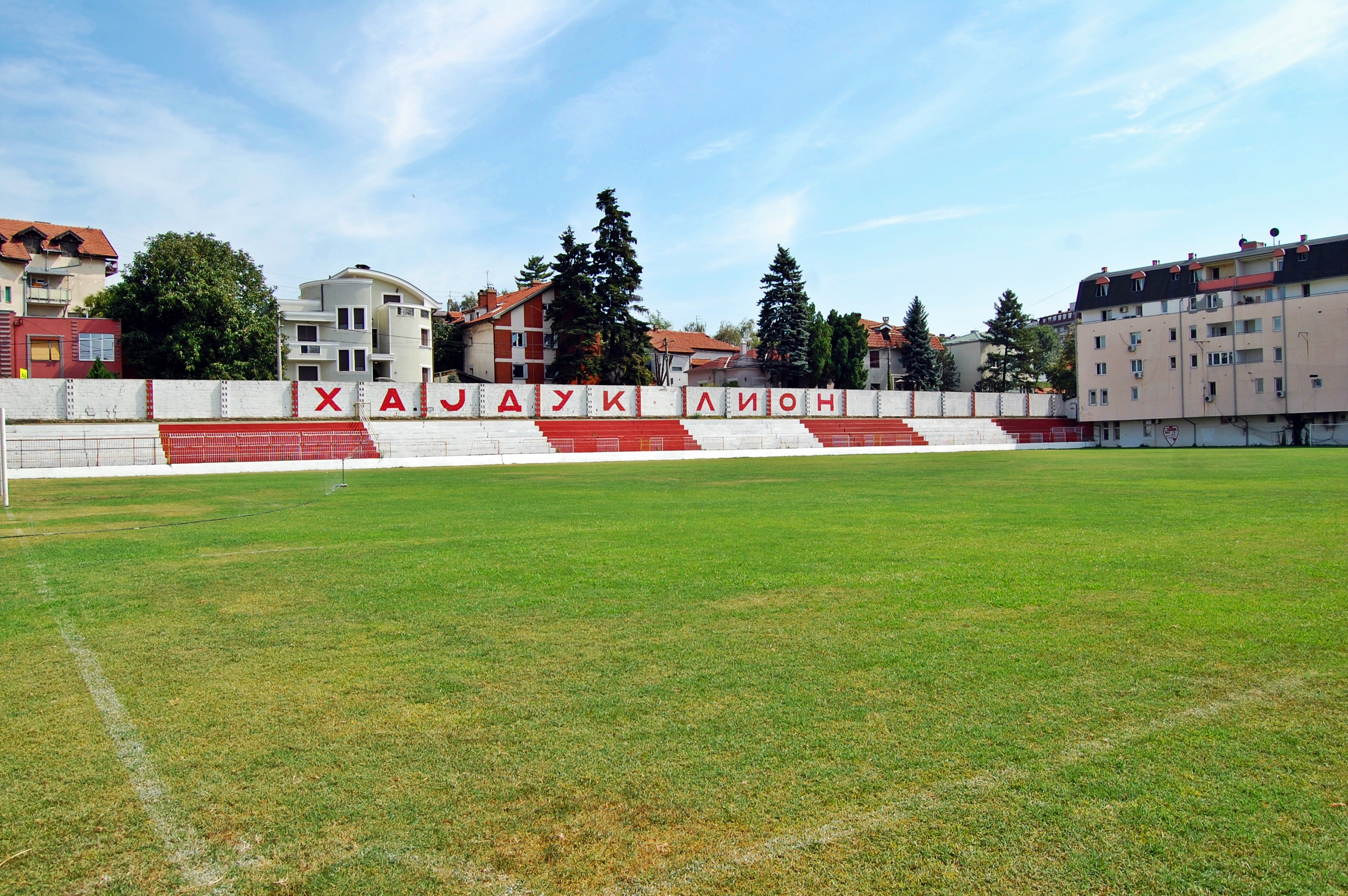
Stadion FK Hajduk

== Honours ==
Second League of Serbia and Montenegro (Tier 2)

- 2003–04 (Group East)

Serbian League North / Serbian League Belgrade (Tier 3)

- 1993–94 / 2006–07

Belgrade Zone League (Tier 4)

- 1992–93

== Seasons ==
Season	League									Cup
Season	Division	Pld	W	D	L	GF	GA	Pts	Pos	Cup
Serbia and Montenegro
1992–93	4 – Belgrade	30	23	5	2	100	21	51	1st	—
1993–94	3 – North	34	19	12	3	66	31	50	1st	—
1994–95	2 – II/B	18	7	4	7	40	33	18	6th	—
1994–95	2 – II/B	18	10	2	6	32	20	28	2nd	—
1995–96	2 – II/A	18	11	1	6	30	22	34	1st	—
1995–96	2 – II/A	18	5	3	10	15	28	32	6th	—
1996–97	2 – East	34	13	12	9	52	44	51	5th	—
1997–98	2 – East	34	17	8	9	65	44	59	4th	Round of 32
1998–99	2 – East	21 (Note: The season was cut short due to the NATO bombing of Yugoslavia.)	12	8	1	28	13	44	2nd	—
1999–2000	1	40	14	3	23	56	75	45	18th	—
2000–01	2 – East	34	28	2	4	93	26	86	2nd	Round of 32
2001–02	2 – East	34	15	10	9	64	44	55	5th	—
2002–03	2 – East	33	11	12	10	46	37	45	7th	—
2003–04	2 – East	36	20	6	10	59	49	66	1st	Round of 32
2004–05	1	30	2	6	22	20	76	12	16th (Note: The club was administratively relegated to the third tier.)	—
2005–06	3 – Belgrade	38	14	16	18	41	48	48	12th	Round of 32
Serbia
2006–07	3 – Belgrade	34	25	7	2	52	15	82	1st	—
2007–08	2	34	12	8	14	28	33	44	13th	—
2008–09	2	34	2	4	28	20	80	10	18th	Quarter-finals
2009–10	3 – Belgrade	30	10	6	14	42	51	36	12th	Preliminary round
2010–11	3 – Belgrade	30	11	7	12	35	39	40	7th	—
2011–12	3 – Belgrade	30	11	8	11	32	43	41	7th	—
2012–13	3 – Belgrade	30	11	6	13	40	52	37 (Note: The club was docked two points.)	10th	—
2013–14	3 – Belgrade	30	10	4	16	45	53	34	13th	—
2014–15	3 – Belgrade	30	4	4	22	33	82	16	16th	—
2015–16	4 – Belgrade	28	7	4	17	35	62	25	13th	—
2016–17	4 – Belgrade	30	12	6	12	36	48	42	10th	—
2017–18	4 – Belgrade	30	11	6	13	48	54	39	9th	—
2018–19	4 – Belgrade	30	5	6	19	31	74	21	16th	—
2019–20	5 – Belgrade	14 (Note: The season was cut short due to the COVID-19 pandemic in Serbia.)	9	1	4	38	18	28	3rd	—
2020–21	5 – Belgrade	30	12	9	9	59	47	45	5th	—
2021–22	5 – Belgrade	26	23	1	2	89	25	70	1st	—
2022–23	4 – Belgrade	30	11	6	13	50	51	39	8th	—
2023–24	4 – Belgrade	30	2	2	26	21	82	8	16th	—
2024–25	5 – Belgrade	26	8	4	14	43	53	28	9th	—

== Rivalries ==
The club has a long-standing rivalry with nearby neighbours Zvezdara. Matches between the two sides are known as the Zvezdara derby.

== Notable players ==
This is a list of players who have played at full international level.

- (North Macedonia) Perica Stančeski
- (Serbia) (Serbia and Montenegro) Vladimir Dišljenković
- (Serbia) Andrija Kaluđerović
- (Serbia) Miljan Vukadinović
- (Serbia and Montenegro) Saša Kovačević
- (Serbia and Montenegro) Nikola Lazetić
- (Serbia and Montenegro) Zoran Ranković
- (Serbia and Montenegro) Miroslav Savić
- (Socialist Federal Republic of Yugoslavia) Stanislav Karasi

For a list of all FK Hajduk Beograd players with a Wikipedia article, see Category:FK Hajduk Beograd players.

== Managerial history ==
Period	Name
	(Federal Republic of Yugoslavia) Miloljub Ostojić
	(Federal Republic of Yugoslavia) Slavko Jović
1999	(Federal Republic of Yugoslavia) Đorđe Gerum
	(Federal Republic of Yugoslavia) Slavko Jović
	(Federal Republic of Yugoslavia) Branko Đokić
	(Serbia and Montenegro) Branko Vojinović
2004	(Serbia and Montenegro) Miodrag Božović
2005	(Serbia and Montenegro) Vojo Ćalov
	(Serbia) Vladimir Madžarević
2008	(Serbia) Aleksandar Kristić
	(Serbia) Branko Đokić
2010–2011	(Serbia) Slavko Jović
	(North Macedonia) Slobodan Goračinov
	(Serbia) Slobodan Slović
	(Serbia) Marjan Živković

Period	Name
	(Serbia) Branko Đokić
	(North Macedonia) Slobodan Goračinov
	(Montenegro) Dragoslav Poleksić
2014	(Serbia) Vladimir Madžarević
2014	(Serbia) Dragan Mučibabić
2015	(Serbia) Miloš Đolović
2015	(Serbia) Predrag Pejović
2015	(Serbia) Jovo Čučković
2015	(Serbia) Vedran Mitrović
2015	(Serbia) Branko Đokić
2016	(Serbia) Bojan Bojičić
2016–2017	(Serbia) Nikola Stojković
	(Serbia) Boško Vukojević
	(Serbia) Vedran Mitrović
