= FK Milicionar =

Defunct football club

Milicionar
- Full name: Fudbalski Klub Milicionar
- Nickname: Plavci (The Blues)
- Founded: 1946; 80 years ago
- Dissolved: 2001
- Ground: Makiš Stadium
- Capacity: 4,000
- 2000–01: First League of FR Yugoslavia, 18th of 18 (relegated)
| Home colours | Away colours |

FK Milicionar (Serbian Cyrillic: ФК Милиционар) was a football club based in Makiš, Belgrade, Serbia.

== History ==
The club was founded as FD Milicionar in 1946 by the Ministry of the Interior. They qualified for the 1946–47 Serbian League, placing fifth in Group North. After the breakup of Yugoslavia, the club started to climb up the league pyramid. They won the Second League of FR Yugoslavia (Group East) in 1998 and took promotion to the First League. The club spent the next three seasons in the top flight, before finishing bottom of the table in 2000–01. They subsequently merged with Radnički Obrenovac, which continued to compete in the 2001–02 Second League of FR Yugoslavia. Simultaneously, the Ministry of the Interior formed a new club called FK Policajac.

== Honours ==
Second League of FR Yugoslavia (Tier 2)

- 1997–98 (Group East)

== Final seasons ==
| Season | League | | | | | | | | | Cup |
| Season | Division | Pld | W | D | L | GF | GA | Pts | Pos | Cup |
FR Yugoslavia
| 1997–98 | 2 – East | 34 | 26 | 3 | 5 | 95 | 31 | 81 | 1st | — |
| 1998–99 | 1 | 24 (Note: The season was cut short due to the NATO bombing of Yugoslavia.) | 8 | 5 | 11 | 39 | 39 | 29 | 11th | — |
| 1999–00 | 1 | 40 | 14 | 9 | 17 | 52 | 52 | 51 | 15th | Semi-finals |
| 2000–01 | 1 | 34 | 8 | 6 | 20 | 29 | 50 | 30 | 18th | Round of 16 |

== Notable players ==
This is a list of players who have played at full international level.

- (Bosnia and Herzegovina) Siniša Mulina
- (Serbia and Montenegro) Milivoje Ćirković
- (Serbia and Montenegro) Ivan Gvozdenović
- (Serbia and Montenegro) Oliver Kovačević
- (Serbia and Montenegro) Nenad Lalatović
- (Serbia and Montenegro) Nikola Lazetić

For a list of all FK Milicionar players with a Wikipedia article, see Category:FK Milicionar players.

== Managerial history ==
| Period | Name |
|---|---|
| 1997–1998 | (Serbia and Montenegro) Stanislav Karasi |
| 1998–1999 | (Serbia and Montenegro) Đorđe Gerum |
| 1999–2000 | (Serbia and Montenegro) Branko Smiljanić |
| 2000 | (Serbia and Montenegro) Vojin Lazarević |
| 2000–2001 | (Serbia and Montenegro) Đorđe Gerum |
| 2001 | (Serbia and Montenegro) Slaviša Božičić |
