= 1994–95 Second League of FR Yugoslavia =

Statistics of Second League of FR Yugoslavia (Serbian: Дpугa савезна лига, Druga savezna liga) for the 1994–95 season.

== Overview ==
The league was divided into 2 groups, A and B, consisting each of 10 clubs. Both groups were played in league system. By winter break all clubs in each group meet each other twice, home and away, with the bottom four classified from A group moving to the group B, and being replaced by the top four from the B group. At the end of the season the same situation happened with four teams being replaced from A and B groups, adding the fact that the bottom three clubs from the B group were relegated into the third national tier. The champion and the second following team were promoted into the 1995–96 First League of FR Yugoslavia.

At the end of the season FK Mladost Lučani became champions, and together with FK Čukarički and FK Mladost Bački Jarak got promoted.

== Club names ==
Some club names were written in a different way in other sources, and that is because some clubs had in their names the sponsorship company included. These cases were:

- Čukarički / Čukarički Stankom
- Novi Sad / Novi Sad Gumins
- Budućnost Valjevo / Budućnost Vujić

== Final table ==
Pos	Club	P	W	D	L	F	A	Pts (from autumn bonification)
1	Mladost Lučani	38						34 (11)
2	Čukarički	38						31 (8)
3	Mladost Bački Jarak	38						29 (9)
4	Novi Pazar	38						28 (7)
5	Mogren	38						28 (10)
6	Mačva Šabac	38						26 (7)
7	Železničar Niš	38						24 (7)
8	Badnjevac	38						23 (8)
9	Javor Ivanjica	38						18 (8)
10	Novi Sad	38						17 (6)
11	Hajduk Beograd	38						28 (6)
12	Jastrebac Niš	38						28 (6)
13	OFK Kikinda	38						28 (7)
14	Priština	38						27 (3)
15	Budućnost Valjevo	38						26 (5)
16	Borac Banja Luka (Note: Between 1992 and 1995, Borac Banja Luka participated in the national competitions organized by the Football Association of FR Yugoslavia. They played their home games in Valjevo due to the Bosnian War.)	38						26 (7)
17	Dinamo Pančevo	38						23 (18)
18	Dubočica	38						22 (4)
19	Iskra Danilovgrad	38						9 (1)
20	Jedinstvo Bijelo Polje	38						3 (1)

== External sources ==
- Season tables at FSGZ
