= Petar Puača =

Serbian footballer

Personal information
- Full name: Petar Puača
- Date of birth: 14 April 1972 (age 54)
- Place of birth: Belgrade, SFR Yugoslavia
- Height: 1.86 m (6 ft 1 in)
- Position: Striker

Youth career
- Bežanija
- Partizan
- Red Star Belgrade

Senior career*
Years	Team	Apps	(Gls)
1989–1990	Red Star Belgrade	0	(0)
1990–1991	Partizan	0	(0)
1991–1994	OFK Beograd	35	(12)
1994–1995	Obilić	35	(21)
1995	OFK Beograd	15	(9)
1996	Red Star Belgrade	11	(2)
1997	Helsingborg	6	(0)
1998–1999	Cremonese	8	(2)
2000	Vojvodina	17	(1)
2001	Zeta	16	(8)
2001–2002	AEK Larnaca	13	(5)
2004	Borac Čačak	1	(0)
2005	Nyíregyháza	5	(2)
Total		162	(62)
- * Club domestic league appearances and goals

Petar Puača (Serbian Cyrillic: Петар Пуача; born 14 April 1972) is a Serbian former professional footballer who played as a striker.

== Career ==
After failing to receive any playing time at Partizan in the 1990–91 season, Puača moved to OFK Beograd, making his first senior appearances during the 1991–92 Yugoslav First League. He spent two more years with the Romantičari, before switching to Obilić in 1994. During the 1996 winter transfer window, Puača was transferred to Red Star Belgrade.

Following his stint with Helsingborgs IF in the 1997 Allsvenskan, Puača moved to Italy and joined Serie B club Cremonese in 1998, initially on trial. He appeared eight times and scored two goals in the second half of the 1998–99 season, as the club finished bottom of the table.

After playing for Vojvodina and Zeta in the First League of FR Yugoslavia, Puača moved to Cyprus and joined AEK Larnaca in the summer of 2001. He was released in February 2002. Before retiring from the game, Puača also briefly played for Borac Čačak and Nyíregyháza Spartacus.

== Career statistics ==
Club	Season	League	
Club	Season	Apps	Goals
OFK Beograd	1991–92	7	0
OFK Beograd	1992–93	17	7
OFK Beograd	1993–94	11	5
OFK Beograd	Total	35	12
Obilić	1994–95	34	21
Obilić	1995–96	1	0
Obilić	Total	35	21
OFK Beograd	1995–96	15	9
Red Star Belgrade	1995–96	11	2
Helsingborgs IF	1997	6	0
Cremonese	1998–99	8	2
Vojvodina	1999–2000	9	0
Vojvodina	2000–01	8	1
Vojvodina	Total	17	1
Zeta	2000–01	16	8
AEK Larnaca	2001–02	13	5
Borac Čačak	2004–05	1	0
Nyíregyháza Spartacus	2005–06	5	2
Career total		162	62

== Honours ==
Red Star Belgrade

- FR Yugoslavia Cup: 1995–96
