= Mike Temwanjera =

Zimbabwean footballer (born 1982)

Personal information
- Date of birth: 21 May 1982 (age 44)
- Place of birth: Harare, Zimbabwe
- Height: 1.87 m (6 ft 2 in)
- Position: Forward

Youth career
- –2001: CAPS United

Senior career*
Years	Team	Apps	(Gls)
2001–2002	CAPS United		
2003–2006	Javor Ivanjica	26	(3)
2006	Borac Čačak	16	(3)
2007–2014	Vaslui	175	(39)
2014–2015	Bangkok United	14	(7)
Total		231	(52)

International career
2005	Zimbabwe	1	(0)
- * Club domestic league appearances and goals

Mike Temwanjera (born 21 May 1982) is a Zimbabwean former professional footballer who played as a forward.

A member of FC Vaslui from January 2007 until summer 2014, he was one of the team's longest serving players, second in scoring during Vaslui's spell in Liga I, with 39 goals. He also appeared once for the Zimbabwe national team.

== Club career ==
=== CAPS United ===
Early on Temwanjera played with CAPS United, traditionally one of the strongest teams in the Zimbabwe Premier Soccer League.

=== Javor Ivanjica ===
In early 2003 Temwanjera came to Serbia for trials with FK Javor Ivanjica, alongside his CAPS United colleagues, Leonard Tsipa and Blessing Makunike. That season, the club suffered relegation from the top league, so Temwanjera played next two seasons in the Second League of Serbia and Montenegro. It was at the end of the 2004–05 season that Javor returned to the First League of Serbia and Montenegro. In the 2005–06 season, Temwanjera played 26 matches and scored 3 goals. However, the club finished 12th and was relegated again.

=== Borac Čačak ===
In the summer of 2006, he signed with FK Borac Čačak. By the end of the first half of the 2006–07 Serbian SuperLiga, Temwanjera had played 16 matches and scored 3 goals, and the club was having a mediocre season. During one match, discontented supporters shouted racially abusive remarks at Temwanjera, who decided to leave the club immediately afterwards. The quickest one to react was Romanian Liga I club SC Vaslui that brought him in that 2006–07 winter transfer window.

=== Vaslui ===
In February 2007, Temwanjera completed his move to Vaslui on a four-and-a-half-year contract for an undisclosed fee. On 27 January, while he was still on trial, Temwanjera made his unofficial debut for Vaslui, against FCM Bârlad, scoring three times in the process. On 24 February, Temwanjera made his competitive debut for Vaslui, in a 1–1 away draw against Farul Constanța. Two weeks later, he scored the equaliser, in the 1–1 draw against FC Argeș, counting his first Liga I goal. On 6 April, he scored twice in the home league match against Gloria Bistrița, once for his own team, and once in his own net. Vaslui eventually won the game with 3–2. In the 2006–07 campaign, he played every single match for Vaslui, scoring three times and helping his team to finish 8th in Liga I, competition best at the time for the Moldavian team.

On 27 July 2007, Temwanjera scored his team's second goal, in Vaslui's opening match against UTA Arad. Nine days later, he provided his first assist from the new season, helping Adrian Gheorghiu to score for 2–0, against Dinamo București. On 31 October, Vaslui won against arch rivals Politehnica Iaşi, thanks to Temwanjera's only goal from the 50th minute. Following a 1–0 loss against Steaua București, and due to his low goal-per-match rate, Temwanjera was put on the transfer list, alongside many other teammates. However, on 7 May 2008, he was not for sale any more, following his two goals scored against Rapid București. He finished 7th with his team in Liga I, thus qualifying in the European Competitions, for the first time.

Although in July 2008, it was rumoured that Metalurh Donetsk was interested in Temwanjera, he eventually remained in Vaslui. On 26 July, he scored his first European goal in UEFA Intertoto's Third Round, against Neftchi Baku, helping his team to advance in the UEFA Cup, for the first time. One week later, he scored the equaliser in the Moldavian Derby against Politehnica Iaşi, match eventually won by Vaslui with 3–1. In August, he provided six points for his team, scoring Vaslui's winning goals against Gloria Bistrița and Oţelul Galaţi. On 5 October, he scored his first cup goal, in his first Romanian Cup appearance against Politehnica Iaşi. On 28 November, he scored his sixth league goal against Universitatea Craiova, surpassing his own personal tally from the previous season. On 18 April 2009, he scored Vaslui's third in a 4–3 home win against Politehnica Timișoara. On 6 May, he scored his last goal of the season, against Pandurii Târgu Jiu, taking his tally of goals to 11. Despite Vaslui's up and down season, he managed to finish 5th with his team, securing its spot for UEFA Europa League, for the second year in a row.

Temwanjera started the 2009–10 season with a double in Vaslui's opening game against Omonia Nicosia. On 23 August, he scored his first league goal against Gloria Bistrița, giving his team a 2–1 lead. Vaslui eventually won with 3–1. On 23 September, he scored his second double from the season, in the cup match against Chimia Brazi. On 3 October, Temwanjera scored his team's second goal in Marius Lăcătuş's first competitive match as manager, in Vaslui's 3–1 home win over Astra Ploiești. On 7 November, he scored the winning goal against Ceahlăul Piatra Neamț. On 23 November, Temwanjera scored Vaslui's first goal, from the 2–0 home league win against CFR Cluj, helping his team winning the eighth match in a row. On 27 February 2010, he suffered a meniscal laceration, in the 2–1 home league win against Pandurii Târgu Jiu, which forced him out from the field for almost nine months.

On 4 November 2010, Mike was awarded "Sportsman of the Year in Vaslui", for his entire activity for the club. After being sidelined for nine months, he returned for Vaslui's 3–1 league win over Pandurii Târgu Jiu on 26 November, coming as a late substitute for Yero Bello. On 12 April 2011, he was in the startup team against Gloria Bistrița, for the first time since February 2010, and he managed to score Vaslui's only goal. Late in April, following his Romanian citizenship request, he stated "My future is tied with this town. I am happy here, and I want to end my career in the yellow-green shirt, when the time will come." On 9 May, in a league game against Astra Ploiești, he was sent off for a bad foul on Alexandru Măţel. He was punished with a two-match ban with two rounds to spare, meaning that Temwanjera's season was over.

On 24 July 2011, played his 100th Liga I match, in Vaslui's opening game against Rapid București. He is only the second Vaslui player, to achieve this feat, joining Bogdan Buhuş. On 18 August, Temwanjera scored his first goal of the season as he netted Vaslui's first in a 2–0 home win over Sparta Prague, helping his team qualifying for the first time in the UEFA Europa League's Group Stages. Three days later, he scored his first league goal of the season, in a 2–1 home defeat against newly promoted Ceahlăul Piatra Neamț. One week later, he scored the 2–1 winning goal for Vaslui, against FC Brașov. On 11 September, he scored the equaliser against Dinamo București, counting his third league goal in a row. Vaslui went on winning with 3–1. Four days later, he won a penalty that gave Vaslui a 2–1 lead in the first match from the group stages of UEFA Europa League against Lazio, after Wesley converted from the spot. The game eventually ended a 2–2 draw. He scored his second goal in UEFA Europa League against FC Zurich in 2–2 draw. On 7 May 2012, he scored a hat-trick against CS Gaz Metan Mediaș. He ended the season with a total of 7 goals in Liga I.

== International career ==
Temwanjera made his international debut for Zimbabwe in a friendly game against Zambia in 2005. It remained his only international appearance.

== Personal life ==
His brothers David and Jealous Wilson are also footballers. In 2012, Temwanjera created his own football academy in Zimbabwe which he named Vaslui Football Academy, after the Vaslui club he played for in Romania.

== Career statistics ==
=== International ===
Appearances and goals by national team and year
National team	Year	Apps	Goals
Zimbabwe
Zimbabwe	2005	1	0
Total		1	0

== Honours ==
Vaslui

- Cupa României runner-up: 2009–10
- UEFA Intertoto Cup: 2008
