= FK Zastava 1973 =

Serbian football club

Zastava 1973
- Full name: Fudbalski Klub Zastava 1973
- Founded: 1973; 53 years ago
- Ground: Stadion Bubanj
- Capacity: 1,000
- League: Kragujevac First League
- 2024–25: Kragujevac First League, 12th of 14
Home colours	Away colours

FK Zastava 1973 (Serbian Cyrillic: ФК Застава 1973) is a football club based in Kragujevac, Serbia. They compete in the Kragujevac First League, the fifth tier of the national league system.

== History ==
Founded in 1973, the club surprisingly reached the semi-finals of the FR Yugoslavia Cup in the competition's inaugural 1992–93 edition, being eliminated by Partizan (losing 6–0 on aggregate). They also competed in the Second League of FR Yugoslavia for four years during the 1990s (1992–1994 and 1996–1998). In 1999–2000, the club won the Serbian League Morava to return to the Second League. They placed 11th in Group West in their comeback season. After the opening four rounds of the 2001–02 campaign, the club withdrew from the league.

== Recent league history ==
Season	Division	P	W	D	L	F	A	Pts	Pos
2020–21	5 - Kragujevac First League	28	13	2	13	56	57	41	8th
2021–22	5 - Kragujevac First League	28	9	4	15	67	68	31	11th
2022–23	5 - Kragujevac First League	26	20	5	1	105	22	65	1st
2023–24	4 - Šumadija-Raška Zone League	24	1	1	22	23	73	4	11th
2024–25	5 - Kragujevac First League	26	8	3	15	37	75	27	12th

== Honours ==
Serbian League Morava (Tier 3)

- 1999–2000

Kragujevac First League (Tier 5)

- 2022–23

== Notable players ==
This is a list of players who have played at full international level.

- (Bosnia and Herzegovina) Đorđe Kamber
- (Montenegro) Vladimir Božović

For a list of all FK Zastava Kragujevac players with a Wikipedia article, see Category:FK Zastava Kragujevac players.
