= 1995–96 FR Yugoslavia Cup =

Tournament details
- Country: Yugoslavia
- Teams: 32

Final positions
- Champions: Red Star
- Runners-up: Partizan

Tournament statistics
- Matches played: 46
- Goals scored: 159 (3.46 per match)

The 1995–96 FR Yugoslavia Cup was the fourth season of the FR Yugoslavia's annual football cup. The cup defenders was Red Star Belgrade, and they were him successfully defended, after they defeated FK Partizan in the final.

== First round ==
Team 1	Score	Team 2
Red Star	6–1	Novi Pazar (II)
Inđija (III)	0–5	Partizan
Novi Sad (II)	4–2	Obilić
Badnjevac (II)	2–1	Vojvodina
Kikinda (II)	3–5	Loznica
Rudar Pljevlja (II)	2–3	Rad
Crvena Stijena (?)	1–8	Napredak Kruševac
Čukarički	2–1	Zemun
Radnički Novi Beograd	4–1	Budućnost Valjevo (II)
Mladost Lučani	2–0	Hajduk Kula
Sutjeska (II)	1–0	Bečej
Sloboda Užice	0–2	Radnički Niš
Borac Čačak	4–0	Mornar (II)
Budućnost Podgorica	3–3 (5–4 p)	Dinamo Pančevo (III)
OFK Beograd	1–2	Priština (II)
Spartak Subotica (II)	1–2	Proleter Zrenjanin

Note: Roman numerals in brackets denote the league tier the clubs participated in the 1995–96 season.

== Second round ==
Team 1	Agg.	Team 2	1st leg	2nd leg
Radnički Novi Beograd	0–4	Red Star	0–1	0–3
Mladost Lučani	1–7	Partizan	1–2	0–5
Novi Sad (II)	2–1	Sutjeska (II)	1–0	1–1
Radnički Niš	1–2	Badnjevac (II)	1–1	0–1
Loznica	2–2 (a)	Borac Čačak	1–0	1–2
Rad	4–1	Budućnost Podgorica	4–0	0–1
Priština (II)	1–4	Napredak Kruševac	1–0	0–4
Čukarički	5–3	Proleter Zrenjanin	3–0	2–3

Note: Roman numerals in brackets denote the league tier the clubs participated in the 1995–96 season.

== Quarter-finals ==
Team 1	Agg.	Team 2	1st leg	2nd leg
Badnjevac (II)	5–3	Čukarički	1–1	1–0
Loznica	3–8	Red Star	2–2	1–6
Novi Sad (II)	3–3 (a)	Napredak Kruševac	2–0	1–2
Rad	1–2	Partizan	0–0	1–2

Note: Roman numerals in brackets denote the league tier the clubs participated in the 1995–96 season.

== Semi-finals ==
12 March 1996

Novi Sad (II)	0–4	Red Star
		Adžić 46', 47'; Milivojev 65'; Puača 81'

Stadion Detelinara, Novi Sad
Attendance: 1,000
Referee: Rade Đurović (Vrbas)
9 April 1996

Red Star	3–0	Novi Sad (II)
Marinović 15'; Puača 53'; Milivojev 74'

Red Star Stadium, Belgrade
Attendance: 400
Referee: Milun Dostanić (Gornji Milanovac)

Red Star won 7–0 on aggregate.

13 March 1996

Badnjevac (II)	1–1	Partizan
Pelemiš 24'		Beširović 81'

Stadion FK Badnjevac, Badnjevac
Attendance: 6,000
Referee: Milan Vidić (Užice)
10 April 1996

Partizan	2–1	Badnjevac (II)
Spasić 10' (o.g.); Trenevski 87'		Jekić 90'

Partizan Stadium, Belgrade
Attendance: 2,000
Referee: Miroslav Radoman (Vrbas)

Partizan won 3–2 on aggregate.

Note: Roman numerals in brackets denote the league tier the clubs participated in the 1995–96 season.

== Final ==
=== First leg ===
8 May 1996

Red Star	3–0	Partizan
Jovičić 8'; Krupniković 37'; Živković 51'	Report

Red Star Stadium, Belgrade
Attendance: 25,000
Referee: Branimir Babarogić (Belgrade)

=== Second leg ===
15 May 1996

Partizan	1–3	Red Star
Vukićević 62'	Report	P. Stanković 45'; Krupniković 65'; D. Stanković 79'

Partizan Stadium, Belgrade
Attendance: 30,000
Referee: Milan Vidić (Užice)

Red Star won 6–1 on aggregate.

== See also ==
- 1995–96 First League of FR Yugoslavia
- 1995–96 Second League of FR Yugoslavia
