= 2008 UEFA European Under-17 Championship elite round =

UEFA U-17 Championship 2008 elite round is the second round of qualifications for the final tournament of UEFA U-17 Championship 2008. The winners of each group join hosts Turkey at the final tournament.

== Group 1 ==
=== Table ===
Team	Pld	W	D	L	GF	GA	GD	Pts
Republic of Ireland	3	1	1	1	4	3	1	4
Portugal	3	1	1	1	3	3	0	4
Germany	3	1	1	1	3	3	0	4
Greece	3	1	1	1	3	4	–1	4

=== Results ===
13 March 2008
14:30

Portugal	1–1	Greece
Nélson Oliveira 18'	Report	K. Papadopoulos 80+1'

Athlone Town Stadium, Athlone
Referee: Hannes Kaasik (Estonia)

13 March 2008
19:00

Republic of Ireland	1–1	Germany
Cunningham 67'	Report	Kroos 8'

Terryland Park, Galway
Referee: Arman Amirkhanyan (Armenia)

15 March 2008
14:30

Germany	0–2	Portugal
	Report	Nuno Reis 68'; Teixeira Caetano 74'

Terryland Park, Galway
Referee: Marcin Borski (Poland)

15 March 2008
19:00

Republic of Ireland	1–2	Greece
Gunning 52'	Report	Dunleavy 39' (o.g.); Vellios 76'

Athlone Town Stadium, Athlone
Referee: Hannes Kaasik (Estonia)

18 March 2008
19:00

Portugal	0–2	Republic of Ireland
	Report	Sullivan 46'; Gunning 55'

Terryland Park, Galway
Referee: Arman Amirkhanyan (Armenia)

18 March 2008
19:00

Greece	0–2	Germany
	Report	Gulde 37' (pen.); Cincotta 69'

Athlone Town Stadium, Athlone
Referee: Marcin Borski (Poland)

== Group 2 ==
=== Table ===
Team	Pld	W	D	L	GF	GA	GD	Pts
Switzerland	3	2	1	0	3	1	2	7
Croatia	3	2	0	1	7	1	6	6
Belgium	3	1	1	1	6	7	–1	4
Denmark	3	0	0	3	2	9	–7	0

=== Results ===
19 March 2008
15:00

Switzerland	1–1	Belgium
Ben Khalifa 73'	Report	Bruno 48'

Makarska
Referee: Babak Guliyev (Azerbaijan)

19 March 2008
15:00

Croatia	3–0	Denmark
Kramarić 11', 17'; Andrijašević 54'	Report

Metković
Referee: István Vad (Hungary)

21 March 2008
15:00

Switzerland	1–0	Denmark
Mehmedi 5'	Report

Ploče
Referee: Babak Guliyev (Azerbaijan)

21 March 2008
15:00

Belgium	0–4	Croatia
	Report	Ivanović 29' (pen.); Vrsaljko 35'; Kramarić 56' (pen.); Maričić 80'

Stadion Gospin dolac, Imotski
Referee: Ovidiu Alin Hategan (Romania)

24 March 2008
15:00

Denmark	2–5	Belgium
Lund Lindsten 13'; Sarić 15'	Report	David 1'; Pottiez 33', 74'; Cosemans 37'; Bruno 80'

Stadion Gospin dolac, Imotski
Referee: István Vad (Hungary)

24 March 2008
15:00

Croatia	0–1	Switzerland
	Report	Borkovic 80+3'

Makarska
Referee: Ovidiu Alin Hategan (Romania)

== Group 3 ==
=== Table ===
Team	Pld	W	D	L	GF	GA	GD	Pts
France	3	2	1	0	7	4	3	7
Israel	3	1	1	1	7	6	1	4
Russia	3	1	0	2	5	8	–3	3
England	3	0	2	1	5	6	–1	2

=== Results ===
25 March 2008
16:00 IDT

England	1–1	France
Rodwell 58'	Report	Nego 78'

Haberfeld Stadium, Rishon LeZion
Referee: Robert Schörgenhofer (Austria)

25 March 2008
16:00 IDT

Israel	3–1	Russia
Golasa 22'; Ghadir 25'; Hakim 43'	Report	Logua 61' (pen.)

Ness Ziona Stadium, Ness Ziona
Referee: Leontios Trattou (Cyprus)

27 March 2008
16:00 IDT

England	2–3	Russia
James 45'; Delfouneso 73'	Report	Kokorin 36'; Stolyarenko 39'; Pugachyov 67'

Haberfeld Stadium, Rishon LeZion
Referee: Robert Schörgenhofer (Austria)

27 March 2008
16:00 IDT

France	3–2	Israel
Grenier 17'; Tafer 39', 69'	Report	Golasa 8'; Ghadir 47'

Ness Ziona Stadium, Ness Ziona
Referee: Dejan Filipović (Serbia)

30 March 2008
16:00 IDT

Israel	2–2	England
Ghadir 38'; Hakim 63'	Report	Mellis 10'; Delfouneso 80+2'

Ness Ziona Stadium, Ness Ziona
Referee: Dejan Filipović (Serbia)

30 March 2008
16:00 IDT

Russia	1–3	France
Zabolotni 39'	Report	Kakuta 13', 49'; Damour 80+2'

Haberfeld Stadium, Rishon LeZion
Referee: Leontios Trattou (Cyprus)

== Group 4 ==
=== Table ===
Team	Pld	W	D	L	GF	GA	GD	Pts
Serbia	3	2	1	0	6	3	+3	7
Sweden	3	1	1	1	3	8	−5	4
Slovakia	3	1	0	2	4	6	−2	3
Czech Republic	3	1	0	2	8	4	+4	3

=== Results ===
26 March 2008
14:30

Slovakia	1–3	Serbia
Bagi 17'	Report	Aleksić 5', 46'; Ljajić 43'

Stadion Čika Dača, Kragujevac
Referee: Pol van Boekel (Netherlands)

26 March 2008
14:30

Czech Republic	6–0	Sweden
Stourac 34', 61'; Vydra 56'; Kadlec 63'; Putz 65'; Dolezel 80+1'	Report

Stadion Badnjevac, Badnjevac
Referee: Dumitru Aurelian Bogaciu (Romania)

28 March 2008
14:30

Slovakia	1–2	Sweden
Mak 9'	Report	Söder 27'; Lundberg 62' (pen.)

Stadion Badnjevac, Badnjevac
Referee: Dumitru Aurelian Bogaciu (Romania)

28 March 2008
14:30

Serbia	2–1	Czech Republic
Aleksić 35' (pen.), 55'	Report	Kadlec 58'

Stadion Čika Dača, Kragujevac
Referee: Vedat Yüksel (Turkey)

31 March 2008
15:30

Czech Republic	1–2	Slovakia
Folprecht 76'	Report	Bagi 38'; Mak 80+2'

Stadion Badnjevac, Badnjevac
Referee: Vedat Yüksel (Turkey)

31 March 2008
15:30

Sweden	1–1	Serbia
Kačaniklić 40'	Report	Aleksić 57' (pen.)

Stadion Čika Dača, Kragujevac
Referee: Pol van Boekel (Netherlands)

== Group 5 ==
=== Table ===
Team	Pld	W	D	L	GF	GA	GD	Pts
Scotland	3	3	0	0	5	1	4	9
Wales	3	1	1	1	4	3	1	4
Slovenia	3	1	1	1	3	2	1	4
Northern Ireland	3	0	0	3	2	8	-6	0

=== Results ===
17 March 2008
16:00

Wales	1–1	Slovenia
Stephens 67'	Report	Berić 51'

Mourneview Park, Lurgan
Referee: Marco Borg (Malta)

17 March 2008
19:30

Northern Ireland	1–3	Scotland
Curran 68'	Report	Fleck 5', 18'; McHugh 9'

The Oval, Belfast
Referee: Libor Kovařík (Czech Republic)

19 March 2008
16:00

Scotland	1–0	Wales
Campbell 70'	Report

Showgrounds, Newry
Referee: Marco Borg (Malta)

19 March 2008
20:00

Northern Ireland	0–2	Slovenia
	Report	Bračko 3'; Vučkić 10'

Showgrounds, Newry
Referee: Dimitrios Kalopoulos (Greece)

22 March 2008
19:30

Wales	3–1	Northern Ireland
Edwards 5'; Dawkin 13'; Williams 49'	Report	P. McLaughlin 43'

Mourneview Park, Lurgan
Referee: Dimitrios Kalopoulos (Greece)

22 March 2008
19:30

Slovenia	0–1	Scotland
	Report	Fleck 75'

Showgrounds, Newry
Referee: Libor Kovařík (Czech Republic)

== Group 6 ==
=== Table ===
Team	Pld	W	D	L	GF	GA	GD	Pts
Spain	3	2	1	0	4	2	2	7
Romania	3	1	2	0	4	3	1	5
Italy	3	0	2	1	2	3	–1	2
Austria	3	0	1	2	1	3	–2	1

=== Results ===
26 March 2008
12:00

Spain	2–2	Romania
Rubén 45'; Gazta 63'	Report	Alibec 7'; Pop 42'

Stadionul Mogoşoaia, Mogoşoaia
Referee: Jan Jílek (Czech Republic)

26 March 2008
14:00

Italy	1–1	Austria
Destro 33' (pen.)	Report	Dragović 9'

Stadionul Concordia, Chiajna
Referee: Stanislav Todorov (Bulgaria)

28 March 2008
12:00

Austria	0–1	Spain
	Report	Canales 80+2'

Stadionul Concordia, Chiajna
Referee: Simon Lee Evans (Wales)

28 March 2008
14:00

Italy	1–1	Romania
Borini 40'	Report	Alibec 79'

Stadionul Mogoşoaia, Mogoşoaia
Referee: Stanislav Todorov (Bulgaria)

31 March 2008
14:00

Spain	1–0	Italy
Manu 60'	Report

Stadionul Concordia, Chiajna
Referee: Jan Jílek (Czech Republic)

31 March 2008
14:00

Romania	1–0	Austria
Albu 8'	Report

Stadionul Mogoşoaia, Mogoşoaia
Referee: Simon Lee Evans (Wales)

== Group 7 ==
=== Table ===
Team	Pld	W	D	L	GF	GA	GD	Pts
Netherlands	3	2	0	1	4	1	3	6
Norway	3	1	1	1	3	3	0	4
Bosnia and Herzegovina	3	1	1	1	3	4	–1	4
Hungary	3	0	2	1	3	5	–2	2

=== Results ===
13 March 2008
17:00

Netherlands	0–1	Bosnia and Herzegovina
	Report	Fazlić 64'

De Winkewijert, Apeldoorn
Referee: Sascha Kever (Switzerland)

13 March 2008
17:00

Hungary	1–1	Norway
Andersen Aase 80+3' (o.g.)	Report	Ibrahim 63'

Sportpark Orderbos, Apeldoorn
Referee: Albert Toussaint (Luxembourg)

15 March 2008
17:00

Netherlands	2–0	Norway
Castillion 19'; Cabral 38'	Report

Sportpark Muldersingel, Wezep
Referee: Sascha Kever (Switzerland)

15 March 2008
17:00

Bosnia and Herzegovina	2–2	Hungary
Durak 9'; Fazlić 61'	Report	Csorba 27'; Tischler 36'

De Winkewijert, Apeldoorn
Referee: Mario Vlk (Slovakia)

18 March 2008
17:00

Hungary	0–2	Netherlands
	Report	Castillion 36'; Sneijder 45'

Sportpark Orderbos, Apeldoorn
Referee: Albert Toussaint (Luxembourg)

18 March 2008
17:00

Norway	2–0	Bosnia and Herzegovina
Eggen Hedenstad 62'; Johansen 69'	Report

Sportpark Muldersingel, Wezep
Referee: Mario Vlk (Slovakia)
