= Đorđe Kamber =

Bosnian footballer

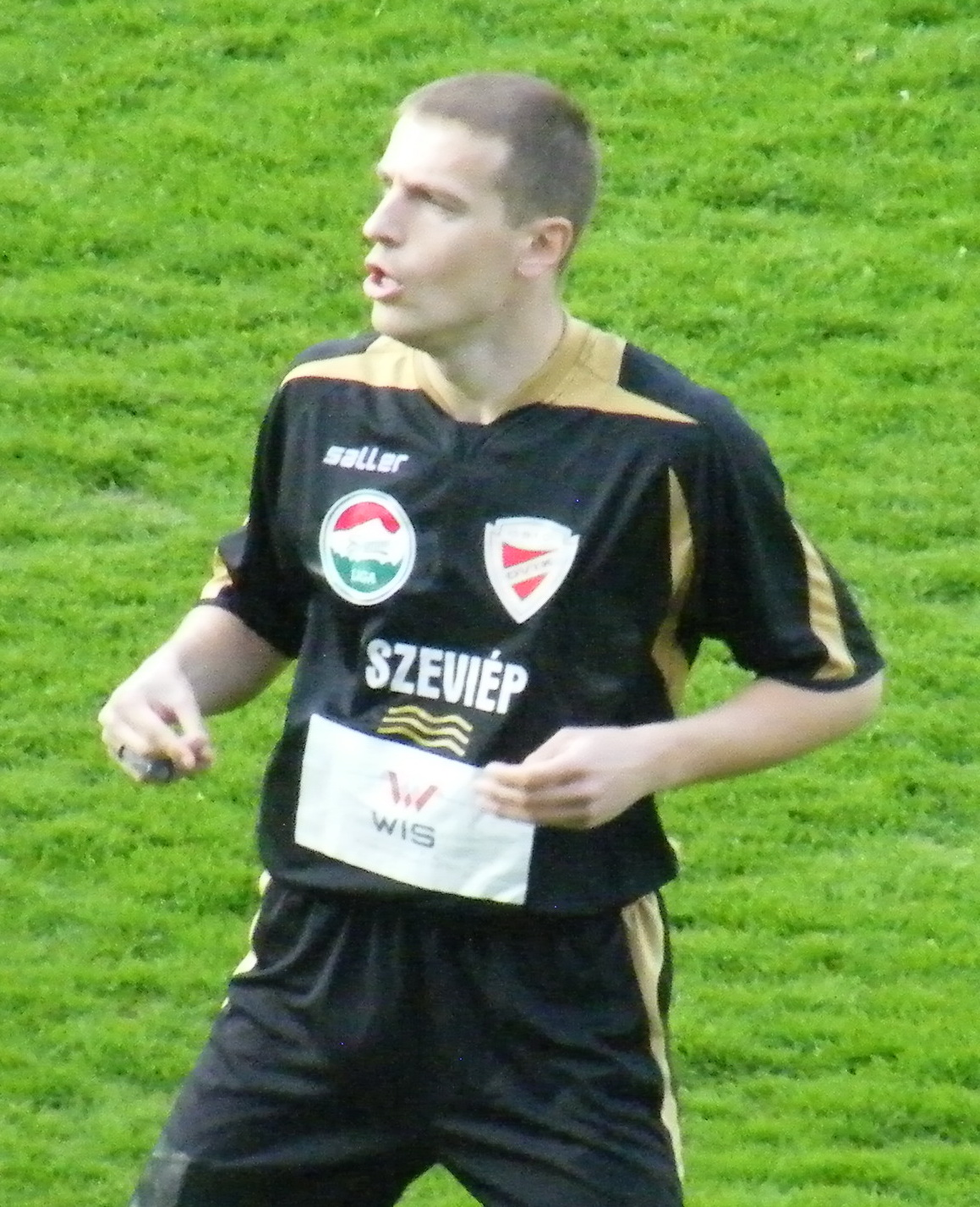

Personal information
- Date of birth: 20 November 1983 (age 42)
- Place of birth: Sanski Most, Bosnia and Herzegovina, Yugoslavia
- Height: 1.83 m (6 ft 0 in)
- Position: Midfielder

Team information
- Current team: Budapest Honvéd II

Senior career*
Years	Team	Apps	(Gls)
1998–2002	Zastava Kragujevac	12	(1)
2001–2002	Remont Čačak	24	(1)
2002–2006	OFK Beograd	37	(0)
2004–2005	→ Mačva Šabac (loan)	39	(1)
2005–2006	→ FK Srem (loan)	15	(0)
2006–2008	Željezničar Sarajevo	41	(3)
2008–2009	Diósgyőr	39	(5)
2009–2012	Zalaegerszeg	75	(12)
2012–2015	Győr	90	(11)
2015–2021	Budapest Honvéd	173	(17)
2021–	Budapest Honvéd II	0	(0)

International career^{‡}
2007	Bosnia and Herzegovina (unofficial)	1	(0)
- * Club domestic league appearances and goals as of 15 May 2021 ‡ National team caps and goals as of 9 June 2010

Đorđe Kamber (Serbian Cyrillic: Ђорђе Камбер; born 20 November 1983) is a Bosnian professional footballer who plays for Hungarian club Budapest Honvéd II.

== Club career ==
He has previously played with Serbian lower leagues clubs FK Zastava Kragujevac, FK Remont Čačak, FK Mačva Šabac and FK Srem, First League of Serbia and Montenegro club OFK Beograd, Premier League of Bosnia and Herzegovina club FK Željezničar and Hungarian National Championship I clubs Diósgyőri VTK and Győri ETO.

=== Budapest Honvéd ===
In the summer of 2015, Kamber left Győr and signed for Honvéd ahead of the 2015–16 Nemzeti Bajnokság I season.

Kamber was an influential member of the Budapest Honvéd squad that won the league title for the first time in 24 years in 2016–17, playing in all 32 league matches. On 3 June 2020, Kamber scored the winning goal for Budapest Honvéd in the final of the Magyar Kupa against Mezőkövesdi SE.

== Club statistics ==
Updated 15 May 2021.

Club	Season	League		Cup		League Cup		Europe		Total	
Club	Season	Apps	Goals	Apps	Goals	Apps	Goals	Apps	Goals	Apps	Goals
Kragujevac
Kragujevac	2000–01	8	1	?	?	–	–	–	–	8	1
Kragujevac	2001–02	4	0	?	?	–	–	–	–	4	0
Kragujevac	Total	12	1	0	0	–	–	–	–	12	1
Remont Čačak
Remont Čačak	2001–02	8	0	?	?	–	–	–	–	8	0
Remont Čačak	2002–03	16	1	?	?	–	–	–	–	16	1
Remont Čačak	Total	24	1	0	0	–	–	–	–	24	1
OFK Beograd
OFK Beograd	2002–03	11	0	?	?	–	–	–	–	11	0
OFK Beograd	2003–04	17	0	?	?	–	–	?	?	17	0
OFK Beograd	2004–05	1	0	?	?	–	–	?	?	17	0
OFK Beograd	2005–06	8	0	?	?	–	–	?	?	8	0
OFK Beograd	Total	37	0	0	0	–	–	0	0	37	0
Mačva Šabac
Mačva Šabac	2004–05	31	1	?	?	–	–	–	–	31	1
Mačva Šabac	2005–06	8	0	?	?	–	–	–	–	8	0
Mačva Šabac	Total	39	1	0	0	–	–	–	–	39	1
Srem
Srem	2005–06	15	0	?	?	–	–	–	–	15	0
Srem	Total	15	0	0	0	–	–	–	–	15	0
Željezničar
Željezničar	2006–07	26	2	?	?	–	–	?	?	26	2
Željezničar	2007–08	15	1	?	?	–	–	–	–	15	1
Željezničar	Total	41	3	0	0	–	–	–	–	41	3
Diósgyőr
Diósgyőr	2007–08	12	2	2	0	–	–	–	–	14	2
Diósgyőr	2008–09	27	3	1	0	12	5	–	–	40	8
Diósgyőr	Total	39	5	3	0	12	5	–	–	54	10
Zalaegerszeg
Zalaegerszeg	2009–10	29	2	9	1	3	1	–	–	41	4
Zalaegerszeg	2010–11	30	6	7	2	4	1	2	0	43	9
Zalaegerszeg	2011–12	17	4	1	0	0	0	–	–	18	4
Zalaegerszeg	Total	76	12	17	3	7	2	2	0	102	17
Győr
Győr	2011–12	12	1	1	0	0	0	–	–	13	1
Győr	2012–13	27	8	5	1	4	1	–	–	36	10
Győr	2013–14	28	2	4	0	3	0	2	0	37	2
Győr	2014–15	24	0	3	0	4	0	2	0	33	0
Győr	Total	91	11	13	1	11	1	4	0	119	13
Budapest Honvéd
Budapest Honvéd	2015–16	31	9	3	0	–	–	–	–	34	9
Budapest Honvéd	2016–17	32	3	2	0	–	–	–	–	34	3
Budapest Honvéd	2017–18	28	1	5	0	–	–	2	0	35	1
Budapest Honvéd	2018–19	30	3	6	1	–	–	4	0	40	4
Budapest Honvéd	2019–20	32	1	5	3	–	–	4	1	41	5
Budapest Honvéd	2020–21	20	0	4	0	–	–	1	0	25	0
Budapest Honvéd	Total	173	17	25	4	–	–	11	1	209	22
Career Total		547	51	58+	8+	30	8	16+	0+	652+	68+

Updated to games played as of 15 May 2021.

== Honours ==
Gyõr

- NB I: 2012–13

Budapest Honvéd

- NB I: 2016–17
- Magyar Kupa: 2019–20
