= 1996–97 Second League of FR Yugoslavia =

Second League of FR Yugoslavia
- Season: 1996–97
- Champions: Priština (East); Sartid Smederevo (West)

1996–97 Second League of FR Yugoslavia (Serbian: Druga liga SR Jugoslavije 1996/97) consisted of two groups of 18 teams.

== League table ==
=== East ===
Pos	Team	Pld	W	D	L	GF	GA	GD	Pts	Promotion or relegation
1	Priština (C, P)	34	19	9	6	56	24	+32	66	Promotion to First League of FR Yugoslavia
2	Palilulac Beograd	34	21	3	10	67	33	+34	66	Qualification for promotion play-off
3	Radnički Pirot	34	17	11	6	56	41	+15	62	
4	Napredak Kruševac	34	16	7	11	51	42	+9	55	
5	Hajduk Beograd	34	13	12	9	52	44	+8	51	
6	Zvezdara	34	14	7	13	47	33	+14	49	
7	Radnički Beograd	34	14	7	13	54	47	+7	49	
8	Novi Sad	34	15	4	15	46	43	+3	49	
9	Dinamo Pančevo	34	12	11	11	53	45	+8	47	
10	Beograd	34	13	8	13	34	42	−8	47	
11	Balkan Bukovica	34	14	5	15	47	62	−15	47	
12	Solunac Karađorđevo	34	13	7	14	46	39	+7	46	
13	Bor	34	13	7	14	41	46	−5	46	
14	Jedinstvo Paraćin (R)	34	12	9	13	35	39	−4	45	Relegation to Serbian League
15	Cement Beočin (R)	34	12	9	13	48	42	+6	45	Relegation to Serbian League
16	Železničar Niš (R)	34	9	10	15	36	52	−16	37	Relegation to Serbian League
17	Sinđelić Niš (R)	34	9	6	19	51	75	−24	33	Relegation to Serbian League
18	Dubočica (R)	34	2	4	28	26	97	−71	10	Relegation to Serbian League

(C) Champions; (P) Promoted; (R) Relegated

=== West ===
Pos	Team	Pld	W	D	L	GF	GA	GD	Pts	Promotion or relegation
1	Sartid Smederevo (C, P)	34	26	4	4	77	20	+57	82	Promotion to First League of FR Yugoslavia
2	Radnički Kragujevac (P)	34	23	6	5	74	28	+46	75	Qualification for promotion play-off
3	Čelik Nikšić	34	23	1	10	77	36	+41	70	
4	Mladi Radnik	34	18	5	11	56	41	+15	59	
5	Rudar Kostolac	34	16	6	12	56	41	+15	54	
6	Badnjevac	34	14	8	12	50	59	−9	50	
7	Mačva Šabac	34	11	13	10	40	31	+9	46	
8	Polimlje	34	12	9	13	41	40	+1	45	
9	Mladost Podgorica	34	13	6	15	48	54	−6	45	
10	Zastava Kragujevac	34	11	10	13	50	47	+3	43	
11	Novi Pazar	34	12	6	16	34	45	−11	42	
12	Šumadija Aranđelovac	34	11	9	14	27	43	−16	42	
13	Mačva Bogatić	34	10	11	13	45	45	0	41	
14	Mogren	34	11	8	15	40	49	−9	41	
15	Javor Ivanjica	34	12	5	17	32	45	−13	41	
16	Iskra Danilovgrad (R)	34	9	7	18	28	64	−36	34	Relegation to Montenegrin League
17	Arsenal Kragujevac (R)	34	8	5	21	42	62	−20	29	Relegation to Serbian League
18	HTP Igalo (R)	34	6	1	27	20	87	−67	19	Relegation to Montenegrin League

(C) Champions; (P) Promoted; (R) Relegated
