= Vladimir Božović (footballer) =

Montenegrin footballer (born 1981)

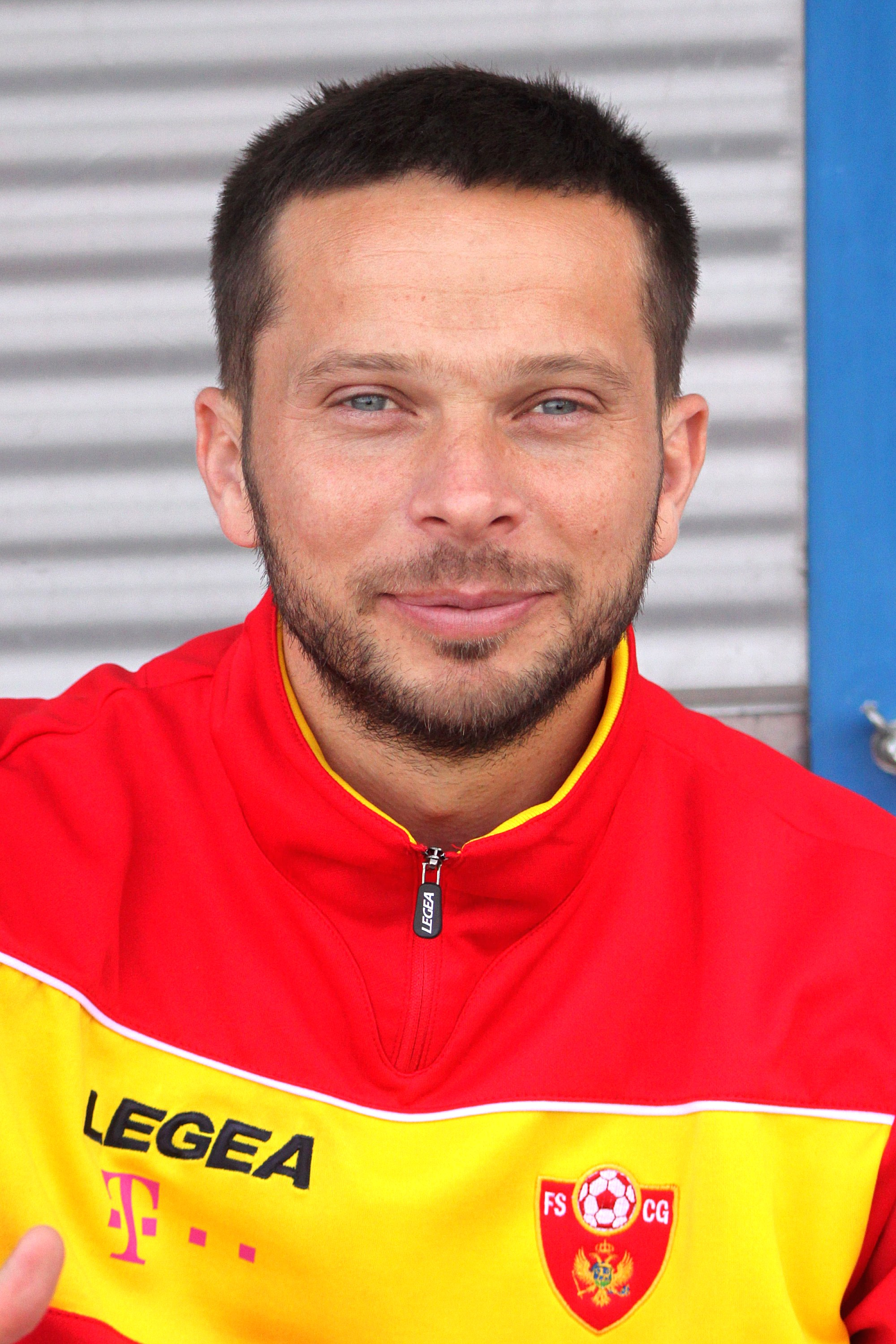
- Božović with Montenegro in 2014

Personal information
- Date of birth: 13 November 1981 (age 44)
- Place of birth: Peć, SR Serbia, SFR Yugoslavia
- Height: 1.82 m (6 ft 0 in)
- Positions: Left-back; left winger

Youth career
- –1999: Sušica Kragujevac

Senior career*
Years	Team	Apps	(Gls)
1999–2000	Zastava Kragujevac	17	(0)
2000–2007	OFK Beograd	80	(14)
2003	→ Proleter Zrenjanin (loan)	17	(0)
2007–2012	Rapid București	131	(3)
2013–2015	Mordovia Saransk	49	(0)
2015–2016	Sušica Kragujevac		
2017	Šumadija 1903	12	(0)
2018–2020	Sušica Kragujevac		
Total		306	(17)

International career
2007–2015	Montenegro	42	(0)

Managerial career
- 2021–2022: Sušica Kragujevac
- * Club domestic league appearances and goals

Vladimir Božović (Serbian Cyrillic: Владимир Божовић, pronounced [ʋlǎdimiːr bôːʒoʋitɕ]; born 13 November 1981) is a Montenegrin former professional football who played as a left-back or a left winger.

== Club career ==
Born in Peć, modern day Kosovo, Božović moved to Kragujevac at an early age. He played for local clubs Sušica and Zastava, before transferring to OFK Beograd in the summer of 2001. Subsequently, Božović spent six seasons with the Romantičari, reaching the final of the Serbia and Montenegro Cup in 2006. He also had two loan spells at Proleter Zrenjanin (2002 and 2004).

In the summer of 2007, Božović signed for Romanian club Rapid București. He made over 150 competitive appearances for the side, winning the domestic Super Cup in his debut year. In the 2013 winter transfer window, Božović moved to Russia and joined Mordovia Saransk.

In early 2016, Božović returned to Serbia and joined his parent club Sušica, helping them earn promotion to the Morava Zone League. He stayed there for a year, before switching to fellow Kragujevac side Šumadija 1903, competing in the Serbian League West. In early 2018, Božović made another return to Sušica, helping them remain in the fourth tier of Serbian football.

== International career ==
Božović was among the founding members of the Montenegro national team, starting their inaugural match versus Hungary on 24 March 2007. He earned 42 international caps for Montenegro between 2007 and 2014.

== Career statistics ==
=== International ===
Appearances and goals by national team and year
National team	Year	Apps	Goals
Montenegro	2007	6	0
Montenegro	2008	8	0
Montenegro	2009	3	0
Montenegro	2010	5	0
Montenegro	2011	7	0
Montenegro	2012	1	0
Montenegro	2013	6	0
Montenegro	2014	6	0
Montenegro	2015	0	0
Total		42	0

== Honours ==
OFK Beograd

- Serbia and Montenegro Cup runner-up: 2005–06

Rapid București

- Supercupa României: 2007
- Cupa României runner-up: 2011–12

Mordovia Saransk

- FNL: 2013–14
