= Blessing Makunike =

Zimbabwean footballer (1977–2004)

Personal information
- Full name: Blessing Makunike
- Date of birth: 24 January 1977
- Place of birth: Salisbury, Rhodesia
- Date of death: 13 March 2004 (aged 27)
- Place of death: Harare, Zimbabwe
- Position: Defender

Senior career*
Years	Team	Apps	(Gls)
- Kadoma Wildcats
1997–2002	CAPS United		
2003	Javor Ivanjica		
2003–2004	CAPS United		

International career
1998–2001	Zimbabwe	8	(1)
- * Club domestic league appearances and goals

Blessing Makunike (24 January 1977 – 13 March 2004) was a Zimbabwean international footballer.

== Club career ==
Makunike started his career in 1997 with Zimbabwe Premier Soccer League club CAPS United F.C., where he played until the end of the 2002 season. Together with his teammate, Leonard Tsipa, he then spent half a season with Serbian club FK Javor Ivanjica, where international Zimbabwean footballer Mike Temwanjera, together with other African players, helped them incorporate into the squad. However, he and Leonard went back to CAPS in the next summer, playing in the second semester of the 2003 Zimbabwean football season.

== International career ==
From 1998 to 2001 he played eight matches for the Zimbabwe national football team having scored one goal.

== Car accident ==
On 13 March 2004, Makunike, together with two other players, Shingirai Alron and Gary Mashoko, and two supporters, burned to death when their car hit the pillar of the bridge and caught fire, the greatest loss of lives in a single incident in Zimbabwean football.

== Honours ==
CAPS United

- Zimbabwe Premier League: 2004
- Zimbabwe Cup: 1997, 1998, 2004
- Independence Trophy: 1997
