= 1995–96 Second League of FR Yugoslavia =

Statistics of Second League of FR Yugoslavia (Serbian: Дpугa савезна лига, Druga savezna liga) for the 1995–96 season.

== Overview ==
The league was divided into 2 groups, A and B, consisting each of 10 clubs. Both groups were played in league system. By winter break all clubs in each group meet each other twice, home and away, with the bottom four classified from A group moving to the group B, and being replaced by the top four from the B group. At the end of the season the same situation happened with four teams being replaced from A and B groups, adding the fact that the bottom three clubs from the B group were relegated into the third national tier. The champion and the second following team were promoted into the 1996–97 First League of FR Yugoslavia.

At the end of the season FK Budućnost Valjevo became champions, and together with OFK Kikinda, FK Železnik, FK Spartak Subotica, FK Rudar Pljevlja and FK Sutjeska Nikšić got promoted.

== Club names ==
Some club names were written in a different way in other sources, and that is because some clubs had in their names the sponsorship company included. These cases were:

- Budućnost Valjevo / Budućnost Vujić
- RFK Novi Sad / Novi Sad Gumins
- Jedinstvo Paraćin / Jedinstvo Cement

== Tables ==
=== Autumn ===
==== IIA league ====
Pos	Team	Pld	W	D	L	GF	GA	GD	Pts	Result
1	Hajduk Beograd	18	–	–	–	–	–	—	34	
2	Mačva Šabac	18	–	–	–	–	–	—	32	
3	OFK Kikinda	18	–	–	–	–	–	—	32	
4	Rudar Pljevlja	18	–	–	–	–	–	—	31	
5	Spartak Subotica	18	–	–	–	–	–	—	31	
6	Novi Pazar	18	–	–	–	–	–	—	28	
7	Sutjeska	18	–	–	–	–	–	—	25	Transfer to Spring IIB League
8	Priština	18	–	–	–	–	–	—	19	Transfer to Spring IIB League
9	Jastrebac Niš	18	–	–	–	–	–	—	17	Transfer to Spring IIB League
10	Mogren	18	–	–	–	–	–	—	11	Transfer to Spring IIB League

==== IIB league ====
Pos	Team	Pld	W	D	L	GF	GA	GD	Pts	Result
1	Budućnost Valjevo	18	–	–	–	–	–	—	39	Transfer to Spring IIA League
2	Badnjevac	18	–	–	–	–	–	—	36	Transfer to Spring IIA League
3	Železnik	18	–	–	–	–	–	—	35	Transfer to Spring IIA League
4	Jedinstvo Paraćin	18	–	–	–	–	–	—	29	Transfer to Spring IIA League
5	Železničar Niš	18	–	–	–	–	–	—	25	
6	Beograd	18	–	–	–	–	–	—	22	
7	Novi Sad	18	–	–	–	–	–	—	21	
8	Radnički Kragujevac	18	–	–	–	–	–	—	17	
9	Javor Ivanjica	18	–	–	–	–	–	—	17	
10	Mornar Bar	18	–	–	–	–	–	—	14	

=== Spring ===
==== IIA league ====
Pos	Team	Pld	W	D	L	GF	GA	GD	BP	Pts	Promotion
1	Budućnost Valjevo (C, P)	18	12	3	3	35	16	+19	11	50	Promotion to First League of FR Yugoslavia
2	OFK Kikinda (P)	18	10	2	6	24	21	+3	11	43	Promotion to First League of FR Yugoslavia
3	Železnik (P)	18	11	1	6	38	19	+19	8	42	Promotion to First League of FR Yugoslavia
4	Spartak Subotica (P)	18	9	3	6	30	17	+13	10	40	Promotion to First League of FR Yugoslavia
5	Rudar Pljevlja (P)	18	5	3	10	30	28	+2	11	29	Qualification for promotion play-off
6	Hajduk Beograd	18	5	3	10	15	28	−13	14	32	
7	Novi Pazar	18	7	1	10	23	32	−9	9	31	
8	Jedinstvo Paraćin	18	7	1	10	30	31	−1	6	28	
9	Badnjevac	18	5	4	9	22	29	−7	9	28	
10	Mačva Šabac	18	4	3	11	15	31	−16	12	27	

Source: Borba
(C) Champions; (P) Promoted

==== IIB league ====
Pos	Team	Pld	W	D	L	GF	GA	GD	BP	Pts	Promotion or relegation
1	Sutjeska (P)	18	10	2	6	38	20	+18	9	41	Promotion to First League of FR Yugoslavia
2	Novi Sad	18	11	3	4	34	14	+20	5	41	
3	Radnički Kragujevac	18	11	3	4	33	10	+23	3	39	
4	Železničar Niš	18	8	2	8	29	28	+1	8	34	
5	Mogren	18	9	1	8	18	29	−11	3	31	
6	Beograd	18	7	3	8	17	19	−2	6	30	
7	Priština	18	7	2	9	32	22	+10	6	29	
8	Javor Ivanjica	18	6	6	6	21	20	+1	2	26	
9	Jastrebac Niš (R)	18	5	4	9	10	31	−21	4	23	Relegation to Serbian League
10	Mornar Bar (R)	18	1	4	13	9	47	−38	1	8	Relegation to Montenegrin League

Source: Borba
(P) Promoted; (R) Relegated

== External sources ==
- Season tables at FSGZ
