= Leonard Tsipa =

Zimbabwean footballer (born 1982)

Personal information
- Full name: Leonard Tsipa
- Date of birth: 25 January 1982 (age 44)
- Place of birth: Harare, Zimbabwe
- Position: Striker

Team information
- Current team: CAPS United

Senior career*
Years	Team	Apps	(Gls)
1999–2002	CAPS United		
2003	Javor Ivanjica	4	(0)
2003–2007	CAPS United		
2008	Dynamos		
2009–2010	CAPS United		
2011	Gunners		
2013–2017	CAPS United		

International career^{‡}
2004–2016	Zimbabwe	7	(1)
- * Club domestic league appearances and goals as of 2 May 2018 ‡ National team caps and goals as of 2 May 2018

Leonard Tsipa (born 25 January 1982) is a Zimbabwean former international footballer.

== Club career ==
In early 2003, together with his CAPS teammates Blessing Makunike and Mike Temwanjera, he went to Serbia, to play with FK Javor Ivanjica. They played in the 2002–03 First League of Serbia and Montenegro but the club finished 12th and was consequently relegated to the second league for the following season. After not getting much chances to play, both returned to CAPS United F.C., where they achieved major success by winning, in 2004 and 2005, the Zimbabwe Premier Soccer League titles. He played most of his career with CAPS, the exceptions were only his spell in Serbia in 2003, and when he played one season in 2008 with previous year Zimbabwean champions Dynamos F.C. managing to finish that season runners-up, however the goal that season was the CAF Champions League where they reached the record semi-finals in 2008 edition. For the 2011 season he moved to the 2010 Zimbabwean champions Gunners F.C. In 2015, he moved back at CAPS United.

== International career ==
By May 2011 Leonard Tsipa has played five matches for the Zimbabwean national team and scored one goal.

== Honours ==
CAPS United

- Zimbabwe Premier League: 2004, 2005, 2016
- Zimbabwean Cup: 2004
