= Slobodan Goračinov =

Macedonian footballer and manager

Personal information
- Full name: Slobodan Goračinov
- Date of birth: 20 January 1963 (age 63)
- Place of birth: Skopje, SR Macedonia
- Position: Defender

Senior career*
Years	Team	Apps	(Gls)
1980–1983	Red Star Belgrade	5	(0)
1983–1986	Vardar	39	(0)
1987–1990	Grazer AK		
1992	LUV Graz		
1992–1993	Waidhofen		

Managerial career
- 1998: Vardar
- 1999: Makedonija Gjorče Petrov
- Palić
- 2013: Hajduk Beograd
- * Club domestic league appearances and goals

Slobodan Goračinov (Macedonian: Слободан Горачинов; born 20 January 1963) is a Macedonian football manager and former player.

== Playing career ==
Born in Skopje, PR Macedonia, still young, he came to Belgrade to play in the Yugoslav giants Red Star youth teams. After playing three seasons in their senior team, he returned to his home town, Skopje, and signed with FK Vardar where he would become a standard player. Afterwards, he went abroad, and signed with Austrian Football Bundesliga club Grazer AK where he played until 1990.

== Managerial career ==
After retiring he became a coach, he coached his former club Vardar in the 1996–97 season. In the 2013–14 season he coached Serbian side FK Hajduk Beograd playing in the Serbian League Belgrade.
