= 1999–2000 First League of FR Yugoslavia =

First League of FR Yugoslavia
- Season: 1999–2000
- Dates: 30 July 1999 – 20 May 2000
- Champions: Red Star; 22nd domestic title
- Relegated: Proleter; Hajduk Beograd; Mogren; Spartak Subotica; Borac Čačak; Priština (withdrew)
- Champions League: Red Star
- UEFA Cup: Partizan; Napredak Kruševac
- Intertoto Cup: Obilić
- Matches: 420
- Goals: 1,094 (2.6 per match)
- Top goalscorer: Mateja Kežman (27)

The 1999–2000 First League of FR Yugoslavia was the eighth season of the FR Yugoslavia's top-level football league since its establishment. It was contested by 21 teams (18 from Serbia and three from Montenegro), and Red Star Belgrade won the championship.

== Incidents ==
The season was marred by a tragic event on 30 October 1999, during the Partizan vs. Red Star tie (113th edition of the Večiti derbi) when seventeen-year-old Red Star fan Aleksandar "Aca" Radović from Opovo was killed by a signalling rocket fired from within the stadium. Radović, a third-year student at the First Belgrade Gymnasium, was supporting his team from the Partizan Stadium's north end when in 20th minute of the match he got hit in the chest by a flare gun-fired signaling rocket from the opposite end of the stadium, which is where Partizan fans were located. Partizan had just scored courtesy of Saša Ilić to go up 1-0 and, as a way of celebrating the goal, certain section of their ultra fans, Grobari, fired a series of ship-signalling rockets from the south stand where they traditionally gather. Most of the rockets landed on the stadium's north stand, the gathering point of Red Star's fans Delije, and one of them hit the unfortunate teenager right in the chest near his throat, cutting his aorta. He died almost instantly as he was being moved from the stands onto the stadium's athletic track and into the ambulance car.

Amazingly, the match was not stopped and the two teams continued playing, a decision that led to a lot of public criticism directed at two clubs, the football league, and the FA.

Further investigation conducted by the police discovered that the particular rocket that killed Radović was fired by Partizan fan Majk Halkijević (born 1975) from Krnjača. In addition to Halkijević, three other individuals—Nenad "Kec" Kecojević (born 1976) from Mali Mokri Lug, Aleksandar "Sale" Aleksić (born 1975) from Krnjača, and Zoran "Prcko" Jovanović (born 1974) from Belgrade—were also firing rockets at the stadium during the match. According to the investigation, the German-made Comet ship-signalling rockets were originally purchased in Greece before being smuggled into Serbia. In Belgrade, Grobari leader Zoran "Čegi" Živanović bought 10 of them along with 60 flares, all from Mirko Urban. Čegi brought the stuff to Partizan Stadium on the day of the derby, handing it over to Časlav "Čaja" Kurandić. Čaja then took the flares and rockets into the stadium with help from FK Partizan's equipment manager Branko "Gavran" Vučićević who hid them inside the bags with team's sports equipment. Once inside the team's dressing room, the packages with flares and rockets were passed to Goran "Tuljak" Matović and Dragan "Lepi Gaga" Petronić through the dressing room's window. The packages were then carried through the east stand and onto the south stand through the protective fence while Nikola "Džoni" Dedović diverted steward's attention. On the south stand, group leader Čegi distributed the rockets and flares to a certain number of Grobari, including Majk Halkijević.

At an almost two-year trial before the Second Municipal Court in Belgrade, the defendants did not face murder charges but a lesser charge of "disturbing public order and causing general endangerment". The verdict by the presiding judge Nataša Albijanić was delivered on 1 March 2001, with Halkijević receiving a 23-month sentence. Aleksandar "Sale" Aleksić got 20 months while Nenad "Kec" Kecojević, Zoran "Čegi" Živanović (Grobari leader), and Časlav "Čaja" Kurandić got 18 months. Furthermore, Dragan "Lepi Gaga" Petronić and Srđan Šalipurović got six months, while Mirko Urban also known as Mirko Pekar (Mirko the Baker), accused of selling the rockets to Grobari, got 18 months. The rest of the accused—Zoran "Prcko" Jovanović, Nikola "Džoni" Dedović, Branko "Gavran" Vučićević, and Goran "Tuljak" Matović—were acquitted.

== Teams ==
Due to decision of the Football Association of FR Yugoslavia of enlargement of the league from 18 to 22 teams, the teams from earlier season was not relegated.

Before the season FK Priština withdrew from the competition due to the situation in Kosovo, so the status of the team was frozen.

From the 1998–99 Second League of FR Yugoslavia to the league was entered: Borac Čačak, Čukarički, Hajduk Beograd and Sutjeska Nikšić.

Location of teams in the 1999–2000 First League

Club	City	Stadium	Capacity
Partizan	Belgrade	Partizan Stadium	32,710
Red Star	Belgrade	Red Star Stadium	55,538
Vojvodina	Novi Sad	Karađorđe Stadium	17,204
Zemun	Zemun, Belgrade	Zemun Stadium	10,000
Rad	Belgrade	Stadion Kralj Petar I	6,000
Proleter	Zrenjanin	Stadion Karađorđev park	13,500
Hajduk Kula	Kula	Stadion Hajduk	6,000
Obilić	Belgrade	FK Obilić Stadium	4,500
Železnik	Belgrade	Železnik Stadium	8,000
Mogren	Budva	Stadion Lugovi	4,000
OFK Beograd	Karaburma, Belgrade	Omladinski Stadium	20,000
Sartid	Smederevo	Smederevo City Stadium	17,200
Spartak	Subotica	Subotica City Stadium	13,000
Radnički	Kragujevac	Čika Dača Stadium	15,000
Hajduk Beograd	Belgrade	Stadion Hajduk Lion	4,500
Čukarički	Belgrade	Stadion Čukarički	7,000
Sutjeska	Nikšić	Gradski stadion (Nikšić)	10,800
Borac	Čačak	Čačak Stadium	6,000
Budućnost Podgorica	Podgorica	Podgorica City Stadium	12,000
Radnički Niš	Niš	Čair Stadium	18,000
Milicionar	Belgrade	SC MUP Makiš	4,000
Priština (withdrew)	Pristina	Pristina City Stadium	25,000

== League table ==
Pos	Team	Pld	W	D	L	GF	GA	GD	Pts	Qualification or relegation
1	Red Star Belgrade (C)	40	33	6	1	85	19	+66	105	Qualification for Champions League first qualifying round
2	Partizan	40	32	5	3	111	30	+81	101	Qualification for UEFA Cup qualifying round
3	Obilić	40	28	5	7	71	32	+39	89	Qualification for Intertoto Cup first round
4	Rad	40	17	9	14	56	46	+10	60	
5	Sutjeska	40	17	9	14	50	50	0	60	
6	Čukarički	40	15	11	14	42	43	−1	56	
7	OFK Beograd	40	15	10	15	58	62	−4	55	
8	Železnik	40	15	9	16	55	47	+8	54	
9	Zemun	40	15	9	16	47	57	−10	54	
10	Vojvodina	40	15	8	17	54	50	+4	53	
11	Radnički Niš	40	16	4	20	50	49	+1	52	
12	Budućnost Podgorica	40	15	7	18	45	45	0	52	
13	Radnički Kragujevac	40	13	13	14	35	41	−6	52	
14	Hajduk Kula	40	15	7	18	39	46	−7	52	
15	Milicionar	40	14	9	17	52	52	0	51	
16	Sartid	40	14	8	18	42	47	−5	50	
17	Proleter Zrenjanin (R)	40	12	10	18	36	49	−13	46	Relegation to Second League of FR Yugoslavia
18	Hajduk Beograd (R)	40	14	3	23	56	75	−19	45	Relegation to Second League of FR Yugoslavia
19	Mogren (R)	40	13	5	22	40	70	−30	44	Relegation to Second League of FR Yugoslavia
20	Spartak Subotica (R)	40	8	5	27	34	84	−50	29	Relegation to Second League of FR Yugoslavia
21	Borac Čačak (R)	40	6	4	30	36	100	−64	22	Relegation to Second League of FR Yugoslavia

Source: RSSSF.org
Rules for classification: 1) points; 2) goal difference; 3) number of goals scored.
Napredak Kruševac from Second League qualify for 2000–01 UEFA Cup as runner-up of 1999–2000 FR Yugoslavia Cup.
(C) Champions; (R) Relegated

== Results ==
Home \ Away	BOR	BUD	ČUK	HJB	HAJ	MIL	MOG	OBI	OFK	PAR	PRO	RAD	RDK	RNI	RSB	SAR	SPA	SUT	VOJ	ŽEL	ZEM
Borac Čačak		2–1	1–2	0–1	1–3	0–5	0–1	0–2	0–2	0–1	0–1	2–3	0–1	0–2	2–2	1–0	1–0	0–2	2–3	2–1	3–2
Budućnost Podgorica	2–0		0–0	2–0	0–2	2–1	4–1	0–2	3–1	1–4	2–0	1–0	2–0	1–0	0–2	1–1	4–0	0–0	4–0	1–0	1–0
Čukarički	2–0	1–1		1–0	0–0	1–1	1–0	1–2	3–3	0–2	2–0	1–1	2–0	2–0	0–1	2–1	2–1	2–2	0–1	0–0	1–2
Hajduk Beograd	3–0	0–2	1–0		1–1	5–1	1–0	0–3	1–2	1–2	2–1	2–2	2–1	4–1	0–3	3–0	3–2	2–0	2–2	2–1	2–1
Hajduk Kula	4–0	0–3	2–0	3–1		2–0	1–0	0–2	2–0	0–5	1–1	2–1	0–1	1–0	1–3	0–1	3–0	0–0	1–1	1–0	3–1
Milicionar	7–4	2–1	2–0	2–0	1–0		5–0	1–0	1–1	0–1	0–0	0–3	1–0	0–0	1–2	1–1	2–0	2–1	0–0	0–2	1–0
Mogren	3–1	1–1	1–3	3–0	1–0	3–1		4–0	1–1	0–7	2–0	1–2	2–1	2–0	0–2	1–0	1–1	2–1	0–0	2–1	1–2
Obilić	6–0	3–1	0–1	3–2	1–0	1–0	2–0		2–2	3–0	3–1	1–0	3–0	2–1	1–1	1–0	2–0	2–1	2–0	2–0	1–0
OFK Beograd	1–4	2–1	3–1	2–1	1–0	2–1	3–1	4–2		2–2	3–1	0–0	1–1	1–0	1–2	0–1	3–0	2–3	2–0	1–1	1–1
Partizan	8–1	4–1	2–1	4–2	3–0	2–1	2–0	0–1	3–0		1–0	1–0	4–0	5–2	2–0	4–0	7–2	2–0	4–1	1–1	4–1
Proleter Zrenjanin	1–1	1–0	0–0	2–0	1–0	3–0	1–2	0–2	2–1	0–2		2–0	1–1	0–0	0–1	1–1	3–0	2–1	0–1	0–0	1–0
Rad	3–0	1–0	2–0	2–1	2–0	1–1	3–1	2–3	0–1	1–2	2–2		1–1	2–1	1–1	0–1	1–0	2–1	1–0	1–0	5–1
Radnički Kragujevac	1–1	1–2	1–3	3–1	2–0	1–0	0–0	0–0	0–0	1–1	0–0	1–2		2–0	1–1	1–0	3–1	3–0	2–1	0–0	1–0
Radnički Niš	4–1	1–0	3–0	2–0	1–0	1–0	4–2	2–1	4–0	0–1	1–3	3–0	0–0		1–2	2–1	2–0	2–0	2–1	2–0	2–3
Red Star	4–0	3–0	1–0	3–0	2–0	3–2	2–0	2–0	3–1	2–1	4–0	1–0	1–0	1–0		2–0	4–0	5–0	4–0	0–0	1–1
Sartid	2–0	2–0	1–1	4–2	4–0	0–2	3–1	2–3	1–0	1–3	2–0	1–1	1–2	1–0	1–2		2–0	0–0	1–0	3–2	1–2
Spartak Subotica	1–1	2–2	2–3	2–0	1–3	3–2	3–0	0–0	1–2	0–6	1–3	2–3	2–1	1–1	0–2	1–0		0–2	1–0	1–0	2–1
Sutjeska	2–1	1–0	0–0	4–3	1–0	2–0	2–0	1–2	3–2	2–2	3–1	1–0	0–1	3–2	0–1	4–1	1–0		1–0	2–1	0–0
Vojvodina	4–0	2–0	2–0	5–1	1–2	0–1	3–0	1–1	3–0	2–2	2–1	3–2	2–0	2–0	1–2	0–1	4–1	1–1		1–0	3–3
Železnik	5–3	1–0	1–2	3–1	2–0	2–2	4–0	0–3	4–3	0–1	3–0	2–2	3–1	3–1	1–3	1–0	3–0	3–1	1–0		2–1
Zemun	2–1	2–0	0–1	0–3	1–1	2–2	2–0	2–1	2–1	0–3	2–0	2–1	2–0	1–0	0–4	0–0	1–0	1–1	2–1	1–1	

Source: RSSSF.org
Legend: Blue = home team win; Yellow = draw; Red = away team win.

== Winning squad ==
Champions: Red Star Belgrade (Coach: Miloljub Ostojić (sacked couple of weeks into the season), Slavoljub Muslin)

Players (league matches/league goals)

- (Slovenia) Milenko Ačimovič
- (Federal Republic of Yugoslavia) Srđan Bajčetić
- (Federal Republic of Yugoslavia) Nikoslav Bjegović
- (Federal Republic of Yugoslavia) Branko Bošković
- (Federal Republic of Yugoslavia) Goran Bunjevčević
- (Federal Republic of Yugoslavia) Milivoje Vitakić
- (Federal Republic of Yugoslavia) Ivan Vukomanović
- (North Macedonia) Blaže Georgioski
- (Bosnia and Herzegovina) Stevo Glogovac
- (Federal Republic of Yugoslavia) Jovan Gojković
- (Federal Republic of Yugoslavia) Ivan Gvozdenović
- (Federal Republic of Yugoslavia) Ivan Dudić
- (Federal Republic of Yugoslavia) Goran Drulić
- (Federal Republic of Yugoslavia) Dejan Ilić
- (Federal Republic of Yugoslavia) Branko Jelić
- (Federal Republic of Yugoslavia) Aleksandar Kocić (goalkeeper)
- (Federal Republic of Yugoslavia) Nenad Lalatović
- (Federal Republic of Yugoslavia) Leo Lerinc
- (Federal Republic of Yugoslavia) Marjan Marković
- (Bosnia and Herzegovina) Dragan Mićić
- (Bosnia and Herzegovina) Nenad Miljković
- (Federal Republic of Yugoslavia) Vladislav Mirković
- (Federal Republic of Yugoslavia) Miodrag Pantelić
- (Federal Republic of Yugoslavia) Dejan Pešić
- (Federal Republic of Yugoslavia) Mihajlo Pjanović
- (Federal Republic of Yugoslavia) Dragan Stevanović
- (Federal Republic of Yugoslavia) Boban Stojanović
- (Federal Republic of Yugoslavia) Dalibor Škorić

== Top goalscorers ==
Rank	Player	Club	Goals
1	(Federal Republic of Yugoslavia) Mateja Kežman	Partizan	27
2	(Federal Republic of Yugoslavia) Mihajlo Pjanović	Red Star	22
3	(Federal Republic of Yugoslavia) Petar Divić	OFK Beograd	21
4	(Federal Republic of Yugoslavia) Vladimir Ivić	Partizan	19
4	(Federal Republic of Yugoslavia) Saša Ilić	Partizan	19
6	(Federal Republic of Yugoslavia) Dragan Đukanović	Mogren	17
7	(Federal Republic of Yugoslavia) Nenad Mirosavljević	Proleter Zrenjanin	15
7	(Federal Republic of Yugoslavia) Gabrijel Radojičić	Obilić	15
9	(Federal Republic of Yugoslavia) Bogić Popović	Hajduk Beograd	14
9	(Federal Republic of Yugoslavia) Zoran Janković	Vojvodina	14
