= Dragoslav Poleksić =

Montenegrin footballer

Personal information
- Full name: Dragoslav Poleksić
- Date of birth: 26 July 1970 (age 56)
- Place of birth: Nikšić, SR Montenegro, SFR Yugoslavia
- Height: 1.91 m (6 ft 3 in)
- Position: Goalkeeper

Senior career*
Years	Team	Apps	(Gls)
1992–1995	Sutjeska Nikšić	49	(0)
1995	Mladost Umčari		
1996	Hajduk Kula	0	(0)
1996–1998	Chaves	8	(0)
1998–2001	Campomaiorense	31	(0)
2001–2002	Espinho	32	(0)
2003–2004	Radnički Obrenovac	28	(0)
2004–2005	Radnički Beograd	4	(0)
2006–2007	Mladenovac	53	(0)
2007–2011	Inđija	118	(0)
2011–2013	Hajduk Beograd	53	(1)
Total		376	(1)

Managerial career
- 2010–2011: Inđija (goealkeeper coach)
- 2013–2014: Hajduk Beograd (coach)
- 2018–2022: Azerbaijan U21 (goalkeeper coach)
- 2022–2023: XO United FC (goalkeeper coach)
- 2023-2024: Voska Sport (coach)
- 2024: Sutjeska Nikšić (assistant)
- 2025-2026: Al-Ramtha (goalkeeper coach)
- * Club domestic league appearances and goals

Dragoslav Poleksić (Serbian Cyrillic: Драгослав Полексић; born 26 July 1970) is a Montenegrin former professional footballer who played as a goalkeeper.

== Playing career ==
After starting out at Sutjeska Nikšić, Poleksić briefly played for Mladost Umčari and Hajduk Kula, before moving abroad in the summer of 1996. He spent six years in Portugal, having stints at Chaves, Campomaiorense and finally Espinho. Subsequently, Poleksić returned to Serbia and Montenegro, joining Radnički Obrenovac in 2003. He would switch to Radnički Beograd the next season. Later on, Poleksić spent one-and-a-half years with Mladenovac, before joining Inđija in the summer of 2007. He helped them win promotion from the third tier to the top flight of Serbian football in three seasons. During the 2010–11 campaign, Poleksić became the oldest player to make an appearance in the Serbian SuperLiga. He also spent two seasons at Serbian League Belgrade club Hajduk Beograd, before hanging up his boots.

== Post-playing career ==
Poleksić served as manager of Hajduk Beograd during the 2013–14 season.

== Honours ==
Campomaiorense

- Taça de Portugal runner-up: 1998–99

Inđija

- Serbian First League: 2009–10
