= FK Badnjevac =

Serbian football club

Badnjevac
- Full name: Fudbalski Klub Badnjevac
- Founded: 1922; 104 years ago
- Ground: Stadion FK Badnjevac
- Capacity: 6,000
- League: Rača-Batočina Municipal League
- 2024–25: Rača-Batočina Municipal League, 5th of 8
Home colours	Away colours

FK Badnjevac (Serbian Cyrillic: ФК Бадњевац) is a football club based in Badnjevac, Serbia. They compete in the Rača-Batočina Municipal League, the seventh tier of the national league system.

== History ==
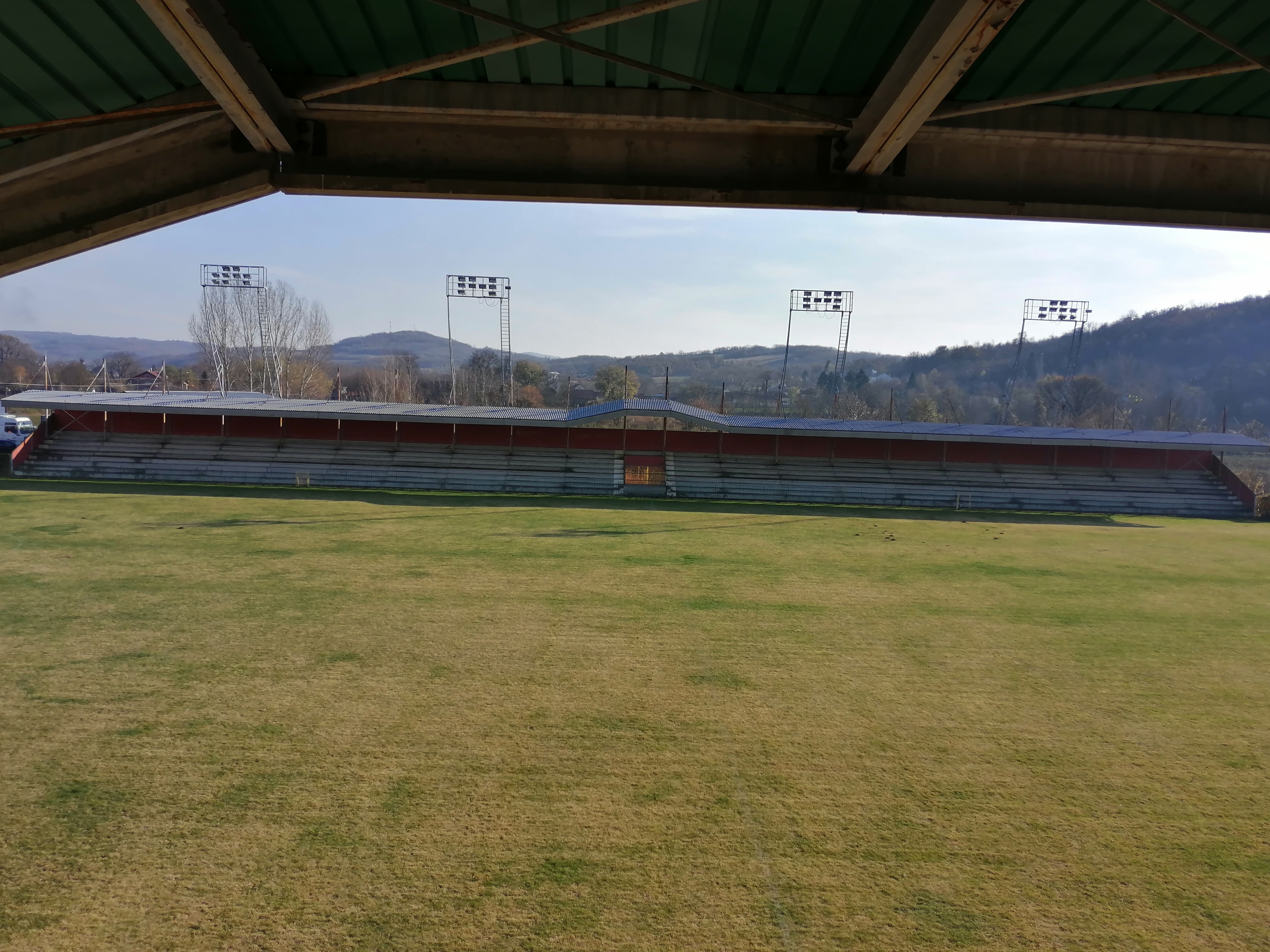
Stadion FK Badnjevac

Following the dissolution of SFR Yugoslavia, the club won the Serbian League West to earn promotion to the Second League of FR Yugoslavia in 1993. They subsequently placed seventh in their debut appearance in the second tier. Over the next two seasons (1994–95 and 1995–96), the club finished in eight and ninth place, respectively. They also surprisingly reached the 1995–96 FR Yugoslavia Cup semi-finals, losing 3–2 on aggregate to Partizan. The club spent two more years in the Second League before suffering relegation to the Serbian League Morava in 1998.

== Recent league history ==
Season	Division	P	W	D	L	F	A	Pts	Pos
2020–21	Interm. League R-K-Batočina	26	21	3	2	86	18	66	1st
2021–22	Šumadija District League	28	7	4	17	28	55	24	14th
2024–25	Rača-Batočina Mun.League	12	4	1	7	18	36	13	5th

== Honours ==
Serbian League West (Tier 3)

- 1992–93

Rača-Knić-Batočina Intermunicipal League (Tier 6)

- 2020–21

Rača-Batočina Municipal League (Tier 7)

- 2017–18

== Managerial history ==
Period	Name
1995–1996	(Federal Republic of Yugoslavia) Aleksandar Miličić
