= 1997–98 Second League of FR Yugoslavia =

Second League of FR Yugoslavia
- Season: 1997–98
- Champions: Milicionar (East); Mogren (West)

1997–98 Second League of FR Yugoslavia (Serbian: Druga liga SR Jugoslavije 1997/98) consisted of two groups of 18 teams.

== League table ==
=== East ===
Pos	Team	Pld	W	D	L	GF	GA	GD	Pts	Promotion or relegation
1	Milicionar (C, P)	34	26	3	5	95	31	+64	81	Promotion to First League of FR Yugoslavia
2	Zvezdara	34	20	5	9	57	27	+30	65	
3	Mladost Apatin	34	19	6	9	65	38	+27	63	
4	Hajduk Beograd	34	17	8	9	65	44	+21	59	
5	Napredak Kruševac	34	16	7	11	66	44	+22	55	
6	Kikinda	34	17	4	13	58	42	+16	55	
7	Dinamo Pančevo	34	16	6	12	55	47	+8	54	
8	Bor	34	15	8	11	51	38	+13	53	
9	Novi Sad	34	14	10	10	62	39	+23	52	
10	Beograd	34	15	7	12	53	41	+12	52	
11	Palilulac Beograd	34	14	9	11	51	43	+8	51	
12	Radnički Beograd	34	14	9	11	53	43	+10	51	
13	Radnički Pirot (R)	34	16	3	15	45	59	−14	51	Relegation to Serbian League
14	Balkan Bukovica (R)	34	14	6	14	59	52	+7	48	Relegation to Serbian League
15	Vučje (R)	34	14	4	16	55	54	+1	46	Relegation to Serbian League
16	Solunac Karađorđevo (R)	34	5	3	26	31	102	−71	18	Relegation to Serbian League
17	Napredak Kušiljevo (R)	34	1	4	29	26	100	−74	7	Relegation to Serbian League
18	Mladost Bački Jarak (R)	34	1	2	31	17	120	−103	5	Relegation to Serbian League

Source: rsssf.org
(C) Champions; (P) Promoted; (R) Relegated

=== West ===
Pos	Team	Pld	W	D	L	GF	GA	GD	Pts	Promotion or relegation
1	Mogren (C, P)	34	21	8	5	69	24	+45	71	Promotion to First League of FR Yugoslavia
2	Čelik Nikšić	34	22	4	8	78	35	+43	70	
3	Mladi Radnik	34	19	5	10	62	33	+29	62	
4	Javor Ivanjica	34	18	3	13	55	39	+16	57	
5	Sloboda Užice	34	17	5	12	54	31	+23	56	
6	Novi Pazar	34	17	4	13	47	32	+15	55	
7	Berane	34	16	6	12	37	34	+3	54	
8	Sloga Kraljevo	34	16	5	13	56	39	+17	53	
9	Mačva Šabac (R)	34	16	4	14	57	56	+1	52	Relegation to Serbian League
10	Zastava Kragujevac (R)	34	15	5	14	48	30	+18	50	Relegation to Serbian League
11	Rudar Kostolac (R)	34	15	2	17	48	30	+18	47	Relegation to Serbian League
12	Mladost Goša (R)	34	14	4	16	50	60	−10	46	Relegation to Serbian League
13	Mačva Bogatić (R)	34	13	4	17	44	42	+2	43	Relegation to Serbian League
14	Ibar (R)	34	12	4	18	48	75	−27	40	Relegation to Montenegrin League
15	Mladost Podgorica (R)	34	11	7	16	33	62	−29	40	Relegation to Montenegrin League
16	Šumadija Aranđelovac (R)	34	10	5	19	36	58	−22	35	Relegation to Serbian League
17	Badnjevac (R)	34	7	6	21	40	71	−31	27	Relegation to Serbian League
18	Polimlje (R)	34	5	2	27	21	86	−65	17	Relegation to Serbian League

Source: rsssf.org, Ibarske novosti (p. 20)
(C) Champions; (P) Promoted; (R) Relegated
