= FK Jastrebac Niš =

Serbian football club

Jastrebac Niš
- Full name: Fudbalski Klub Jastrebac Niš
- Nickname: Jastrebovi (The Goshawks)
- Founded: 1946; 80 years ago
- Dissolved: 2010
- Ground: Stadion FK Jastrebac
- Capacity: 5,000
- 2009–10: Niš First League (withdrew)
Home colours	Away colours

FK Jastrebac Niš (Serbian Cyrillic: ФК Јастребац Ниш) is a defunct football club based in Niš, Serbia.

== History ==
Simultaneously with the final breakup of Yugoslavia, the club placed first in the Yugoslav Inter-Republic League (Group East), earning promotion to the second tier. They subsequently won the Second League of FR Yugoslavia in the 1992–93 season and took promotion to the First League (I/B League). However, the club finished bottom of the table and suffered relegation after just one season. They spent the next two years in the Second League (1994–95 and 1995–96), before suffering relegation to the Serbian League Niš.

== Honours ==
Second League of FR Yugoslavia (Tier 2)

- 1992–93

Yugoslav Inter-Republic League (Tier 3)

- 1991–92 (Group East)

== Notable players ==
This is a list of players who have played at full international level.

- (Serbia and Montenegro) Ivica Kralj
- (Serbia and Montenegro) Saša Zorić

For a list of all FK Jastrebac Niš players with a Wikipedia article, see Category:FK Jastrebac Niš players.
