= FK Priština =

Defunct football club

Priština
- Full name: FK Priština
- Founded: 1922 (disputed)
- Dissolved: 1999
- Ground: Pristina City Stadium
- Capacity: 25,000
- 1999–2000: First League of FR Yugoslavia (withdrew)
Home colours	Away colours

FK Priština (Serbian Cyrillic: ФК Приштина) was a football club based in Pristina. They competed in the First League of FR Yugoslavia for three seasons between 1992 and 1999, before withdrawing due to the Kosovo War.

== History ==
In 1992, following the dissolution of SFR Yugoslavia, the club was operated by Kosovo Serbs and competed within the leagues of the Football Association of FR Yugoslavia. They took part in the inaugural edition of the First League of FR Yugoslavia, but were relegated. Over the next four seasons, the club participated in the Second League, placing first in Group East in 1996–97 to earn promotion back to the First League. They lastly played in the NATO bombing-suspended 1998–99 season. With the conclusion of the Kosovo War, the club was taken over by Kosovo Albanians and withdrew from the league.

== Honours ==
Second League of FR Yugoslavia (Tier 2)

- 1996–97 (Group East)

== Seasons ==
Season	League									Cup
Season	Division	Pld	W	D	L	GF	GA	Pts	Pos	Cup
SFR Yugoslavia
1991–92	2	36	19	1	16	52	44	39	6th	—
FR Yugoslavia
1992–93	1	36	7	9	20	32	64	23	18th	Round of 32
1993–94	2 – II/A	18	9	5	4	18	12	23	1st	Round of 32
1993–94	2 – II/A	18	2	5	11	14	27	20	9th	Round of 32
1994–95	2 – II/B	18	6	2	10	29	35	14	8th	—
1994–95	2 – II/B	18	10	4	4	35	20	27	4th	—
1995–96	2 – II/A	18	5	4	9	18	29	19	8th	Round of 16
1995–96	2 – II/B	18	7	2	9	32	22	29	7th	Round of 16
1996–97	2 – East	34	19	9	6	56	24	66	1st	—
1997–98	1 – I/B	33	17	9	7	57	28	60	3rd	Round of 16
1998–99	1	24 (Note: The season was cut short due to the NATO bombing of Yugoslavia.)	5	3	16	25	49	18	17th	Round of 32
1999–2000	1	Withdrew								Withdrew

== Notable players ==
This is a list of players who have played at full international level.

- (Montenegro) Jovan Tanasijević
- (Federal Republic of Yugoslavia) Goran Đorović

For a list of all FK Priština players with a Wikipedia article, see Category:FK Priština players.

== Managerial history ==
Period	Name
1992–1993	(North Macedonia) Ilija Dimoski
1993–1994	(Federal Republic of Yugoslavia) Dušan Radonjić
1994	(Federal Republic of Yugoslavia) Dragutin Spasojević
1996–1997	(Federal Republic of Yugoslavia) Slavenko Kuzeljević
1997–1998	(Federal Republic of Yugoslavia) Zoran Čolaković
1998–1999	(Federal Republic of Yugoslavia) Timotije Davidović
