= 1993–94 Second League of FR Yugoslavia =

Second League of FR Yugoslavia
- Season: 1993–94
- Champions: Borac Čačak
- Promoted: Borac Čačak; Obilić
- Relegated: Topličanin; Inđija; Zastava Kragujevac; Jagodina; Lovćen

The 1993–94 Second League of FR Yugoslavia was the second season of the Second League of FR Yugoslavia. It was won by Borac Čačak, finishing as one of two promoted teams.

== Overview ==
The league consisted of 20 clubs divided into two groups, "A" and "B", with 10 clubs each. At the end of the Fall half-season, the last four clubs were relegated from "A" League and their spots taken by the four first-placed clubs from "B" League. According to the standings, the clubs were awarded "bonus points" for the Spring half-season.

At the end of the Spring half-season, first two clubs from "A" League were promoted to the First "B" League. The third-paced played a play-off tie with the eight from First "B" League and the fourth-placed played with the seventh from First "B" League. Last four clubs were relegated, while the fifth and sixth from the bottom played a play-off tie with the runners-up of the Republican Leagues.

== League table ==
=== Fall ===
==== Second "A" League ====
Pos	Team	Pld	W	D	L	GF	GA	GD	Pts	Promotion, qualification or relegation
1	Priština	18	9	5	4	18	12	+6	23	
2	Borac Čačak	18	10	2	6	33	13	+20	22	
3	Obilić	18	9	4	5	29	10	+19	22	
4	Dinamo Pančevo	18	9	3	6	26	29	−3	21	
5	Novi Sad	18	7	5	6	14	9	+5	19	
6	Novi Pazar	18	8	3	7	19	17	+2	19	
7	Mačva Šabac (R)	18	6	6	6	16	19	−3	18	Transfer to Second "B" League
8	Borac Banja Luka (Note: Between 1992 and 1995, Borac Banja Luka participated in the national competitions organized by the Football Association of FR Yugoslavia. They played their home games in Valjevo due to the Bosnian War.) (R)	18	4	5	9	12	17	−5	13	Transfer to Second "B" League
9	Mladost Lučani (R)	18	4	4	10	18	30	−12	12	Transfer to Second "B" League
10	Agrounija Inđija (R)	18	4	3	11	20	49	−29	11	Transfer to Second "B" League

(R) Relegated

==== Second "B" League ====
Pos	Team	Pld	W	D	L	GF	GA	GD	Pts	Promotion, qualification or relegation
1	Čukarički (P)	18	8	4	6	30	18	+12	20	Transfer to Second "A" League
2	Badnjevac (P)	18	8	4	6	34	24	+10	20	Transfer to Second "A" League
3	Jedinstvo Bijelo Polje (P)	18	9	2	7	19	18	+1	20	Transfer to Second "A" League
4	Loznica (P)	18	7	6	5	21	23	−2	20	Transfer to Second "A" League
5	Topličanin	18	7	4	7	23	21	+2	18	
6	Dubočica	18	8	2	8	28	30	−2	18	
7	Mladost Bački Jarak	18	7	3	8	24	20	+4	17	
8	Zastava Kragujevac	18	6	5	7	14	21	−7	17	
9	Lovćen	18	7	2	9	26	26	0	16	
10	Jagodina	18	5	4	9	16	34	−18	14	

(P) Promoted

=== Spring ===
==== Second "A" League ====
Pos	Team	Pld	W	D	L	GF	GA	GD	Pts	Promotion, qualification or relegation
1	Borac Čačak (C, P)	18	10	4	4	32	14	+18	34	Promotion to First "B" League
2	Obilić (P)	18	9	4	5	28	17	+11	31	Promotion to First "B" League
3	Novi Pazar	18	8	5	5	25	26	−1	28	Qualification for First "B" League play-offs
4	Loznica	18	8	5	5	25	18	+7	27	Qualification for First "B" League play-offs
5	Čukarički	18	10	3	5	23	18	+5	27	
6	Badnjevac	18	8	4	6	25	19	+6	25	
7	Dinamo Pančevo (R)	18	3	10	5	15	18	−3	25	Transfer to Second "B" League
8	Novi Sad (R)	18	4	5	9	18	25	−7	20	Transfer to Second "B" League
9	Priština (R)	18	2	5	11	14	27	−13	20	Transfer to Second "B" League
10	Jedinstvo Bijelo Polje (R)	18	3	5	10	12	35	−23	15	Transfer to Second "B" League

(C) Champions; (P) Promoted; (R) Relegated

==== Second "B" League ====
Pos	Team	Pld	W	D	L	GF	GA	GD	Pts	Promotion, qualification or relegation
1	Mladost Lučani (P)	18	11	3	4	33	18	+15	29	Transfer to Second "A" League
2	Mačva Šabac (P)	18	7	6	5	26	22	+4	28	Transfer to Second "A" League
3	Mladost Bački Jarak (P)	18	10	2	6	29	20	+9	26	Transfer to Second "A" League
4	Dubočica (P)	18	7	5	6	21	19	+2	26	Transfer to Second "A" League
5	Borac Banja Luka	18	9	2	7	27	26	+1	25	Qualification for Second "B" League play-offs
6	Topličanin (R)	18	8	2	8	27	27	0	24	Qualification for Second "B" League play-offs
7	Agrounija Inđija (R)	18	9	2	7	27	21	+6	23	Relegation to Serbian League
8	Zastava Kragujevac (R)	18	7	2	9	21	22	−1	20	Relegation to Serbian League
9	Jagodina (R)	17	4	3	10	22	31	−9	13	Relegation to Serbian League
10	Lovćen (R)	17	3	1	13	11	38	−27	10	Relegation to Serbian League

(P) Promoted; (R) Relegated
