= 1992–93 Second League of FR Yugoslavia =

Yugoslavian football league

Second League of FR Yugoslavia
- Season: 1992–93
- Champions: Jastrebac Niš
- Top goalscorer: Vojislav Budimirović

Statistics of Second League of FR Yugoslavia (Serbian: Druga liga SR Jugoslavije 1992/93) for the 1992–93 season.

== Overview ==
The league was composed of clubs from Serbia and Montenegro after the other former Yugoslav republics became independent and left the league at the end of the 1991–92 Yugoslav Second League.

The champion and the 2 following teams were promoted into the 1993–94 First League of FR Yugoslavia.

At the end of the season FK Jastrebac Niš became champions.

== Club names ==
Some club names were written in a different way in other sources, and that is because some clubs had in their names the sponsorship company included. These cases were:

- Jastrebac Niš / Jastrebac Narvik
- Rudar Pljevlja / Rudar Volvoks
- Borac Čačak / Borac Cane
- Obilić / Obilić Kopeneks
- Jedinstvo Bijelo Polje / Jedinstvo Tošpred
- Radnički Pirot / Radnički Trikom

== Final table ==
| Pos | Team | Pld | W | D | L | GF | GA | GD | Pts | Promotion or relegation |
|---|---|---|---|---|---|---|---|---|---|---|
| 1 | Jastrebac Niš (C, P) | 38 | 23 | 5 | 10 | 64 | 32 | +32 | 51 | Promotion to First League of FR Yugoslavia |
| 2 | Sloboda Užice (P) | 38 | 19 | 13 | 6 | 57 | 27 | +30 | 51 | Promotion to First League of FR Yugoslavia |
| 3 | Rudar Pljevlja (P) | 38 | 19 | 10 | 9 | 63 | 27 | +36 | 48 | Qualification for promotion play-off |
| 4 | Mačva Šabac | 38 | 19 | 9 | 10 | 58 | 33 | +25 | 47 | Qualification for promotion play-off |
| 5 | Borac Čačak | 38 | 20 | 7 | 11 | 62 | 31 | +31 | 47 | |
| 6 | Mladost Lučani | 38 | 18 | 9 | 11 | 52 | 34 | +18 | 45 | |
| 7 | Dinamo Pančevo | 38 | 16 | 11 | 11 | 42 | 28 | +14 | 43 | |
| 8 | Novi Sad | 38 | 17 | 8 | 13 | 50 | 31 | +19 | 42 | |
| 9 | Obilić | 38 | 15 | 8 | 15 | 45 | 39 | +6 | 38 | |
| 10 | Agrounija Inđija | 38 | 13 | 11 | 14 | 45 | 51 | −6 | 37 | |
| 11 | Novi Pazar | 38 | 15 | 7 | 16 | 49 | 47 | +2 | 37 | |
| 12 | Zastava Kragujevac | 38 | 12 | 10 | 16 | 38 | 48 | −10 | 34 | |
| 13 | Dubočica | 38 | 11 | 12 | 15 | 31 | 42 | −11 | 34 | |
| 14 | Jedinstvo Bijelo Polje | 38 | 12 | 10 | 16 | 30 | 39 | −9 | 34 | Qualification for relegation play-off |
| 15 | Radnički Kragujevac (R) | 38 | 10 | 12 | 16 | 30 | 46 | −16 | 32 | Qualification for relegation play-off |
| 16 | Vrbas (R) | 38 | 11 | 9 | 18 | 44 | 57 | −13 | 31 | Qualification for relegation play-off |
| 17 | Sloga Kraljevo (R) | 38 | 12 | 7 | 19 | 43 | 71 | −28 | 31 | Qualification for relegation play-off |
| 18 | Radnički Pirot (R) | 38 | 13 | 4 | 21 | 41 | 74 | −33 | 30 | Relegation to Serbian League |
| 19 | Bor (R) | 38 | 8 | 9 | 21 | 36 | 67 | −31 | 25 | Relegation to Serbian League |
| 20 | Timok (R) | 38 | 8 | 7 | 23 | 33 | 79 | −46 | 23 | Relegation to Serbian League |

Source: FK Vrbas 1969-2007 (p. 117)
(C) Champions; (P) Promoted; (R) Relegated
