= Saša Zorić =

Serbian footballer

Personal information
- Full name: Saša Zorić
- Date of birth: 2 September 1974 (age 52)
- Place of birth: Gornji Milanovac, SFR Yugoslavia
- Height: 1.70 m (5 ft 7 in)
- Position: Midfielder

Youth career
- Takovo
- Red Star Belgrade

Senior career*
| Years | Team | Apps | (Gls) |
| 1993–1994 | Jastrebac Niš | 11 | (0) |
| 1994–1996 | Obilić | 53 | (9) |
| 1996–1998 | Baltimore Spirit (indoor) | 75 | (67) |
| 1997 | Hershey Wildcats | 11 | (6) |
| 1998–2000 | Obilić | 49 | (14) |
| 2000–2001 | Red Star Belgrade | 22 | (1) |
| 2001–2003 | Obilić | 36 | (3) |
| 2003–2006 | Smederevo | 63 | (7) |
| 2006 | Nanjing Yoyo | 14 | (1) |
| 2007 | Changsha Ginde | 3 | (0) |
| 2007 | Xiamen Lanshi | 11 | (0) |
| 2008 | Kolubara | 21 | (2) |
| 2009 | Srem | 9 | (0) |
| 2009 | Banat Zrenjanin | 13 | (0) |
| Total | | 391 | (110) |

International career
| 2001 | FR Yugoslavia | 2 | (0) |
- * Club domestic league appearances and goals

Saša Zorić (Serbian Cyrillic: Саша Зорић; born 2 September 1974) is a Serbian former footballer who played as a midfielder.

== Club career ==
Born in Gornji Milanovac, Zorić started out at local club Takovo, before joining the youth system of Red Star Belgrade. He would make his senior debut with First League of FR Yugoslavia newcomers Jastrebac Niš during the 1993–94 season. Between 1994 and 1996, Zorić spent two seasons with Obilić.

In late 1996, Zorić moved to the United States to play indoor soccer by signing with the Baltimore Spirit on a two-year contract. He totaled 75 appearances and scored 67 goals over his two seasons in the National Professional Soccer League (NPSL). In 1997, Zorić briefly played for the Hershey Wildcats of the A-League.

In 1998, Zorić returned to his homeland and rejoined Obilić. He spent two seasons with the club, scoring 14 goals in 49 league games over the next two seasons. In July 2000, Zorić was transferred to his parent club Red Star Belgrade. He helped them win the championship title in the 2000–01 season, before returning to Obilić. From 2003 to 2006, Zorić played three seasons for Smederevo, formerly known as Sartid.

In 2006, Zorić moved abroad for the second time and joined Chinese club Nanjing Yoyo. He also played for Changsha Ginde and Xiamen Lanshi, before returning to Serbia and joining Kolubara in early 2008. After brief stints with Srem and Banat Zrenjanin, Zorić retired from the game.

== International career ==
At international level, Zorić represented FR Yugoslavia at the 2001 Kirin Cup, appearing in both of his team's matches in the tournament.

== Honours ==
Red Star Belgrade

- First League of FR Yugoslavia: 2000–01

Kolubara

- Serbian League Belgrade: 2007–08
