= Dalibor Škorić =

Serbian footballer (born 1971)

Personal information
- Full name: Dalibor Škorić
- Date of birth: 9 September 1971 (age 55)
- Place of birth: Knin, SFR Yugoslavia
- Height: 1.81 m (5 ft 11 in)
- Position: Midfielder

Youth career
- Dinara

Senior career*
| Years | Team | Apps | (Gls) |
| 1991–1992 | Mogren | 28 | (0) |
| 1992–1993 | Rudar Pljevlja | | |
| 1993 | Partizan | 4 | (0) |
| 1994–1995 | Rudar Pljevlja | 47 | (5) |
| 1995–1997 | Rad | 59 | (14) |
| 1997–1999 | Red Star Belgrade | 43 | (7) |
| 2000 | Dalian Shide | | |
| 2000–2001 | APOEL | 23 | (9) |
| 2001 | Rad | 15 | (1) |
| 2002 | MTK Budapest | 1 | (0) |
| Total | | 220 | (36) |
- * Club domestic league appearances and goals

Dalibor Škorić (Serbian Cyrillic: Далибор Шкорић; born 9 September 1971) is a Serbian former footballer who played as a midfielder.

== Career ==
After starting out at his hometown club Dinara, Škorić played for Mogren in the 1991–92 Yugoslav Second League. He also played for Rudar Pljevlja, before joining Partizan in 1993.

Between 1995 and 1997, Škorić had two successful seasons with Rad, earning himself a transfer to Red Star Belgrade. He helped the team win the FR Yugoslavia Cup in the 1998–99 season.

In the 2000 winter transfer window, Škorić moved abroad and joined Chinese club Dalian Shide. He also played professionally in Cyprus (APOEL) and Hungary (MTK Budapest).

== Honours ==
Red Star Belgrade

- FR Yugoslavia Cup: 1998–99
