= FK Javor Ivanjica =

Serbian football club

Javor Matis
- Full name: FK Javor Ivanjica
- Founded: 1912; 114 years ago
- Ground: Stadion kraj Moravice
- Capacity: 5,000
- President: Dragomir Lazović
- Head coach: Branko Mirjačić
- League: Serbian First League
- 2025–26: Serbian SuperLiga, 14th of 16 (relegated)
- Website: fkjavor.com
Home colours	Away colours	Third colours

FK Javor Ivanjica (Serbian Cyrillic: ФК Јавор Ивањица), known as Javor Matis for sponsorship reasons, is a professional football club based in Ivanjica, Serbia. They compete in the Serbian First League, the second tier of Serbian football.

== History ==
In 1912, a student named Milan Radojević brought the first football ball to Ivanjica, which led to the formation of the club. The team mostly played friendly matches before the conclusion of World War II due to a lack of organized football competitions. Between 1958 and 1962, they were close to achieving promotion to the Yugoslav Second League. However, the club never reached higher than the third level until the 1990s.

In 1994, led by manager Slavenko Kuzeljević, the club earned promotion to the Second League of FR Yugoslavia after eliminating Zvezdara and Topličanin in the playoffs. They spent the next eight years in the second tier, having their best season in 1997–98, when they placed fourth in Group West.

In 2002, the club won the Second League (Group West) and took promotion to the First League of FR Yugoslavia for the first time in history. They remained for just one season in the elite division, finishing bottom of the table. During this time, the club became recognizable for featuring a number of young African footballers, mainly from Nigeria and Zimbabwe. They earned another promotion to the top flight in 2005, but again suffered relegation in the same season.

After underperforming in the 2006–07 Serbian First League, the second tier of the restructured national league system, the club managed to convincingly win first place in the 2007–08 season. Moreover, manager Radovan Ćurčić led his team to an unbeaten record and promotion to the Serbian SuperLiga. They subsequently placed fourth in the top flight, their highest league position to date. In 2012, the club celebrated its 100th anniversary.

After a total of six consecutive seasons in the SuperLiga, the club suffered relegation in 2014. However, they won promotion back in the next season. The club subsequently made its greatest success by reaching the final of the 2015–16 Serbian Cup, losing 2–0 to Partizan at the Stadion Metalac.

== Honours ==
- Second League of FR Yugoslavia / Serbian First League (Tier 2)
  - Champions (2): 2001–02 (Group West), 2007–08

== Seasons ==
Season	League									Cup
Season	Division	Pld	W	D	L	GF	GA	Pts	Pos	Cup
Serbia and Montenegro
1996–97	2 – West	34	12	5	17	32	45	41	15th	—
1997–98	2 – West	34	18	3	13	55	39	57	4th	Round of 32
1998–99	2 – West	21 (Note: The season was cut short due to the NATO bombing of Yugoslavia.)	9	3	9	28	30	30	9th	—
1999–2000	2 – West	34	11	11	12	50	47	44	10th	—
2000–01	2 – West	34	15	8	11	40	33	53	6th	—
2001–02	2 – West	32	27	4	1	81	14	85	1st	—
2002–03	1	34	9	7	18	21	44	34	15th	—
2003–04	2 – West	36	17	5	14	55	39	56	4th	Quarter-finals
2004–05	2 – Serbia	38	22	8	8	44	30	74	2nd	Round of 16
2005–06	1	30	8	8	14	22	35	32	12th	Round of 32
Serbia
2006–07	2	38	15	9	14	35	42	54	12th	Round of 32
2007–08	2	34	18	16	0	38	12	70	1st	Quarter-finals
2008–09	1	33	13	14	6	39	27	53	4th	Round of 16
2009–10	1	30	8	14	8	22	23	38	7th	Round of 32
2010–11	1	30	10	11	9	21	24	41	8th	Round of 32
2011–12	1	30	11	6	13	28	32	39	9th	Quarter-finals
2012–13	1	30	9	7	14	38	40	34	10th	Semi-finals
2013–14	1	30	6	11	13	29	38	29	15th	Round of 32
2014–15	2	30	17	10	3	47	19	61	2nd	Round of 32
2015–16	1	37	10	13	14	25	29	26	13th	Runners-up
2016–17	1	37	11	10	16	34	50	22	8th	Round of 16
2017–18	1	37	10	6	21	33	57	24	15th	Quarter-finals
2018–19	2	37	23	8	6	78	37	46	2nd	Round of 16
2019–20	1	30 (Note: The season was shortened due to the COVID-19 pandemic in Serbia.)	6	10	14	43	62	28	13th	Round of 32
2020–21	1	38	12	10	16	45	53	46	16th	Round of 16
2021–22	2	37	19	12	6	57	30	69	2nd	Round of 16
2022–23	1	37	9	10	18	35	56	37	12th	Round of 32
2023–24	1	37	11	7	19	34	51	40	13th	Round of 16
2024-25	2	37	19	12	6	44	25	69	2nd	Round of 16

== Players ==
=== First-team squad ===
As of 31 January 2026

Note: Flags indicate national team as defined under FIFA eligibility rules; some limited exceptions apply. Players may hold more than one non-FIFA nationality.

No.	Pos.	Nation	Player
1	GK	SRB	Nikola Vasiljević
2	DF	SRB	Milan Ilić
3	DF	SRB	Stefan Vilotić
5	DF	SRB	Nemanja Đokić
6	MF	NIG	Mamane Amadou Sabo
7	MF	SRB	Andrej Mandić
8	FW	SRB	Andreja Ristić (on loan from Sarajevo)
9	FW	GHA	Ibrahim Tanko
10	MF	SRB	Dušan Pantelić
11	DF	SRB	Stefan Milošević (captain)
12	GK	SRB	Dimitrije Stevanović
13	DF	SRB	Marko Bjeković
14	FW	NGR	Kayode Saliman
15	DF	BIH	Dušan Ristić

No.	Pos.	Nation	Player
17	MF	GHA	Benjamin Acquah
18	MF	CIV	Hervé Touré (on loan from Boulogne)
19	MF	FRA	Boubacari Doucouré (vice-captain)
20	FW	SRB	Aleksa Radonjić
21	DF	SRB	Petar Petrović
22	FW	SRB	Ognjen Krsmanović (on loan from Mladost Lučani)
23	GK	SRB	Nikola Petrović
24	FW	DEN	Mass Sise
25	FW	SRB	Petar Đoković
26	DF	SRB	Đorđe Skoko
28	MF	SRB	Lazar Mićić
29	DF	BIH	Savo Šušić
30	DF	SRB	Marko Kolaković
32	MF	SRB	Mateja Zuvić

=== On dual registration ===
Note: Flags indicate national team as defined under FIFA eligibility rules; some limited exceptions apply. Players may hold more than one non-FIFA nationality.

No.	Pos.	Nation	Player
29	DF	BIH	Savo Šušić (with FAP until the end of the 2025–26 season)

=== Out on loan ===
Note: Flags indicate national team as defined under FIFA eligibility rules; some limited exceptions apply. Players may hold more than one non-FIFA nationality.

No.	Pos.	Nation	Player
—	DF	SRB	Stefan Mitrović (at Loznica until the end of the 2025–26 season)
—	DF	SRB	Ivan Trač (at FK Mladi Radnik until the end of the 2025–26 season)

No.	Pos.	Nation	Player
—	FW	SRB	Nikola Čolić (at Borac Čačak until the end of the 2025–26 season)
—	FW	SRB	Martin Anđelković (at FAP until the end of the 2025–26 season)

=== Coaching staff ===
Position	Name
Manager	(Serbia) Branko Mirjačić
Assistant manager	(Serbia) Dušan Stojanović (Serbia) Nebojša Milosavljević (Serbia) Igor Tufegdžić
Goalkeeping coach	(Serbia) Gordan Kostić
Fitness coach	(Serbia) Nebojša Pešić
Physiotherapist	(Serbia) Mirko Stević
Doctor	(Serbia) Miodrag Kurtić

=== Notable players ===
This is a list of players who have played at full international level.

- (Angola) Alexander Christovão
- (Bosnia and Herzegovina) Nemanja Supić
- (Cameroon) Ibrahim Walidjo
- (Canada) Derek Cornelius
- (Jamaica) Norman Campbell
- (Jamaica) Trivante Stewart
- (Montenegro) Boris Kopitović
- (Montenegro) Aleksandar Šofranac
- (North Macedonia) Filip Ivanovski
- (Serbia) Jovan Đokić
- (Serbia) Marko Gajić
- (Serbia) Andrej Ilić
- (Serbia) Marko Jevremović
- (Serbia) Damir Kahriman
- (Serbia) Nemanja Miletić
- (Serbia) Milovan Milović
- (Serbia) Miljan Mutavdžić
- (Serbia) Petar Petrović
- (Serbia) Miroslav Vulićević
- (Serbia and Montenegro) Mihajlo Pjanović
- (Uzbekistan) Husniddin Gafurov
- (Socialist Federal Republic of Yugoslavia) Petar Krivokuća
- (Socialist Federal Republic of Yugoslavia) Srboljub Krivokuća
- (Zimbabwe) Blessing Makunike
- (Zimbabwe) Mike Temwanjera
- (Zimbabwe) Leonard Tsipa

For a list of all FK Javor Ivanjica players with a Wikipedia article, see Category:FK Javor Ivanjica players.

== Coaching history ==
- (Serbia and Montenegro) Slavko Vojičić
- (Serbia and Montenegro) Slavenko Kuzeljević (1993–1995)
- (Serbia and Montenegro) Slavko Vojičić
- (Serbia and Montenegro) Boris Bunjak (1997–1998)
- (Serbia and Montenegro) Slavko Vojičić
- (Serbia and Montenegro) Radovan Ćurčić (2003–2006)
- (Serbia) Srđan Vasiljević (2006)
- (Serbia) Goran Marić (2006–2007)
- (Serbia) Radovan Ćurčić (2007–2010)
- (Serbia) Zoran Njeguš (2010–2011)
- (Serbia) Vladan Milojević (2011)
- (Serbia) Goran Marić (caretaker) (2011)
- (Serbia) Aleksandar Janjić (2011–2012)
- (Serbia) Mladen Dodić (2012–2013)
- (Serbia) Bogić Bogićević (2013)
- (Serbia) Predrag Ristanović (2013–2014)
- (Serbia) Slavenko Kuzeljević (10 Mar 2014– Apr 15)
- (Serbia) Aleksandar Janjić (27 Apr 2015–7 Jan 16)
- (Serbia) Mladen Dodić (9 Jan 2016-23 May 16)
- (Serbia) Miloš Veselinović (5 Jun 2016-22 Dec 16)
- (Serbia) Srđan Blagojević (25 Dec 2016–Apr 17)
- (Serbia) Srđan Vasiljević (12 Apr 2017-Sep 17)
- (Bosnia and Herzegovina) Vlado Jagodić (21 Sep 2017–18)
- (Serbia) Milovan Milović (caretaker) (2018)
- (Serbia) Igor Tufegdžić (2018–2019)
- (Serbia) Igor Bondžulić (4 Jun 2019–Jun 21)
- (Serbia) Milovan Milović (11 Jun 2021–14 Mar 22)
- (Serbia) Igor Bondžulić (14 Mar 2022-Oct 22)
- (Serbia) Mladen Dodić (4 Oct 2022–2023)
- (Serbia) Milovan Milović (caretaker) (2023)
- (Serbia) Radovan Ćurčić (5 Jun 2023-22 May 2026)
- (Serbia) Branko Mirjačić (8 Jun 2026-)
