= Badnjevac, Batočina =

Badnjevac Бадњевац
- Village (Selo)
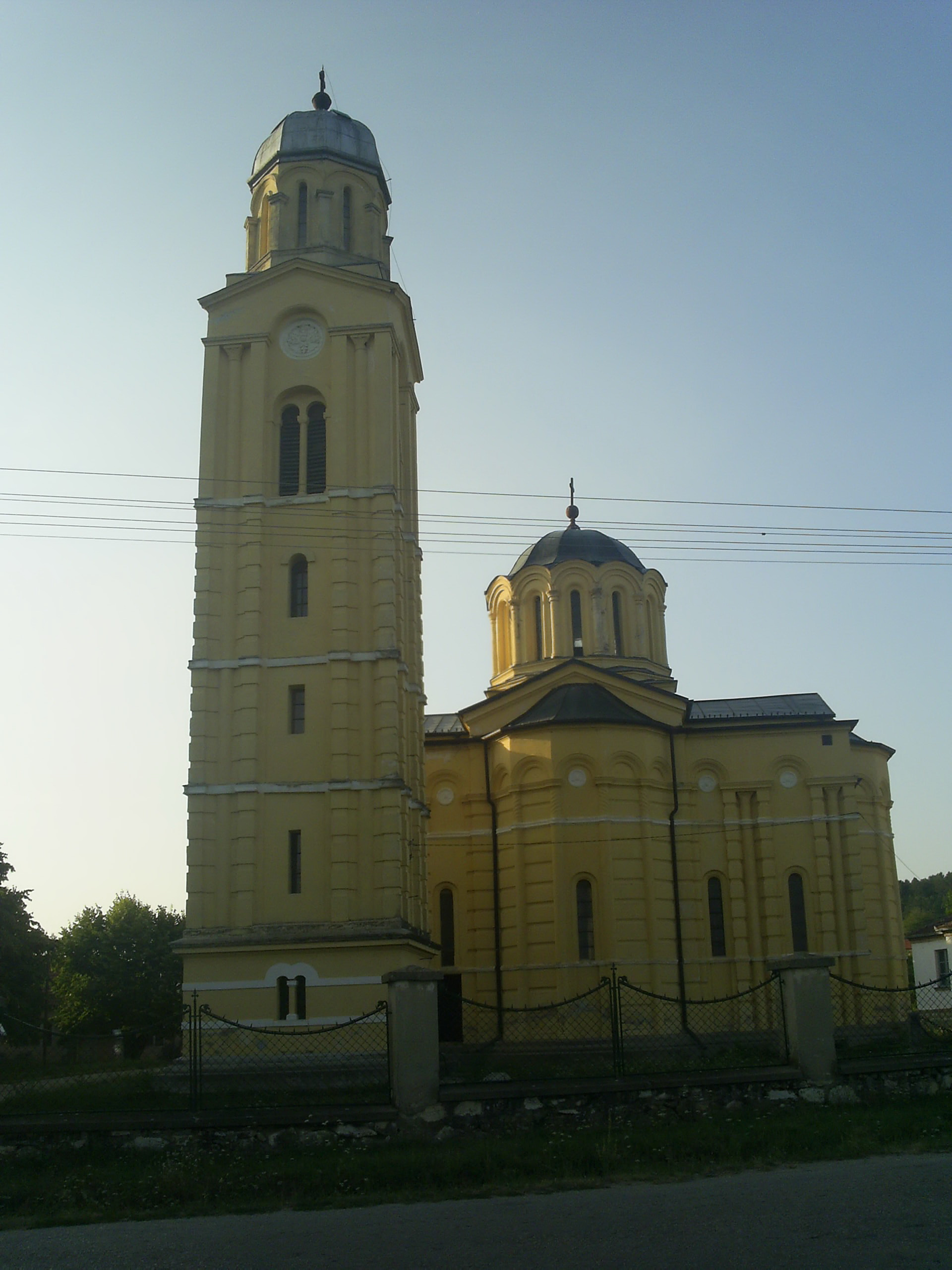
- Church of Saints Peter and Paul in Badnjevac

- Location of Badnjevac in Serbia
- Coordinates: 44°8′20″N 21°1′10″E
- Country: Serbia
- District: Šumadija
- Municipality: Batočina
- Elevation: 495 ft (151 m)

Population (2011)
  - Total: 1,084
- Time zone: UTC+1 (CET)
  - Summer (DST): UTC+2 (CEST)
- Postal code: 34226
- Area code: 034
- Geocode: 702838
- Car plates: KG

Badnjevac (Serbian: Бадњевац) is a village in the municipality of Batočina in the Šumadija District of Serbia. The population was 1,084 in the 2011 census.

== Geography ==
The village of Badnjevac is located in the central part of Serbia, in the eastern half of Šumadija District. It lies 7.75 kilometres (4.82 mi) to the west of the town of Batočina, the seat of the municipality. The nearest city is Kragujevac, about 15.65 kilometres (9.72 mi) to the southwest. Belgrade is 87 kilometres (54 mi) to the north. Badnjevac lies along the Lepenica River, which flows northeast towards the Great Morava River.

== Demographics ==
As of the 2011 census, there were 1,084 people, 342 households and 323 families residing in the village. The average household size was 3.17 and the average family size was 2.90.

Of the total families, 53.2% were couples living together with children, 36.5% were couples living together without children, 5.8% had a female householder with no husband present, and 4.3% had a male householder with no wife present. 23.1% of total households were made up of individuals; 36.3% had 2 or 3 members; 26.3% had 4 or 5 members; and 14.3% had 6 or more members.

The median age in the village was 44.0 years. 16.6% of residents were under the age of 18; 15.4% were between the ages of 18 and 29; 23.8% were from 30 to 49; 27.8% were from 50 to 69; and 16.3% were 70 years of age or older. The gender makeup of the village was 52.8% male and 47.2% female.

According to the 2002 census, the village had a population of 1,165 people. The ethnic composition of the village was 99.1% Serbian, with 0.9% identifying as other groups. The population has declined over the past 5 censuses since 1961.

== Transportation ==
The village has a railway station on the line between Lapovo and Kragujevac. The nearest expressway is the State Road 24, which links Batočina and Kraljevo.

== Sports ==
FK Badnjevac once played in Serbia's third tier, but as of 2025/26 features on the 7th level.
