= Second League of Serbia and Montenegro =

- Founded: 1992
- Folded: 2006
- Country: Serbia and Montenegro
- Confederation: UEFA
- Number of clubs: 16-20
- Level on pyramid: 2
- Promotion to: First League of Serbia and Montenegro
- Relegation to: Serbian League; Montenegrin League
- Domestic cup(s): Serbia and Montenegro Cup
- International cup(s): UEFA Cup; UEFA Intertoto Cup

The Second League of Serbia and Montenegro was the second tier of the football league system in Serbia and Montenegro, one level below the First League of Serbia and Montenegro.

== History ==
Formed in 1992 after the breakup of Yugoslavia, it consisted of a single league for the first four seasons of its formation before splitting into regional leagues in 1996. In 2004 the league was divided into two groups, Group Serbia and Group Montenegro. In 2005, Second League was split into the Serbian First League and the Montenegrin First League, one year before the split of the country.

From 1992 to 1996, the division was split into two groups of 10; Group A (known as IIA) for the top seeded teams and Group B (IIB) for the other teams. After the first half of the season, when all teams have played each other twice in their respective group, the bottom four teams of the IIA group are replaced with the top four teams of IIB for the second half of the season. At the end of the season, performance-based bonus points are applied and the standings from both groups are collated to determine the champions, promotion and relegation, and which group the remaining teams will start next season in.

The two-group format was scrapped in 1996 and the division was split geographically into parallel leagues, starting with Eastern and Western sections until 1999. A Northern section was included to the tier in 1999 and in 2000, a Southern section was added containing only Montenegrin teams.

== List of champions ==
=== 1992–1996: Second League ===
Season	Champions	Runners-up	Third place
1992–93	Jastrebac Niš (1)	Sloboda Užice	Rudar Pljevlja
1993–94	Borac Čačak (1)	Obilić	Novi Pazar
1994–95	Mladost Lučani (1)	Čukarički	Mladost Bački Jarak
1995–96	Budućnost Valjevo (1)	OFK Kikinda	Železnik

=== 1996–1999: Second League – East / West ===
Season	Region	Champions	Runners-up	Third place
1996–97	East	Priština (1)	Palilulac Beograd	Radnički Pirot
1996–97	West	Sartid Smederevo	Radnički Kragujevac	Čelik Nikšić
1997–98	East	Milicionar (1)	Zvezdara	Mladost Apatin
1997–98	West	Mogren	Čelik Nikšić	Mladi Radnik
1998–99	East	Čukarički (1)	Hajduk Beograd	Zvezdara
1998–99	West	Borac Čačak (2)	Sutjeska Nikšić	Bane

=== 1999–2000: Second League – North / East / West ===
Season	Region	Champions	Runners-up	Third place
1999–00	North	Beograd (1)	Novi Sad	Radnički Beograd
1999–00	East	Napredak Kruševac (5)	Železničar Lajkovac	Budućnost Valjevo
1999–00	West	Zeta (1)	Mladost Lučani	Novi Pazar

=== 2000–2004: Second League – North / East / South / West ===
Season	Region	Champions	Runners-up	Third place
2000–01	North	Mladost Apatin (1)	Proleter Zrenjanin	Radnički Beograd
2000–01	East	Zvezdara (1)	Hajduk Beograd	Dubočica
2000–01	South	Rudar Pljevlja (1)	Bokelj	Mogren
2000–01	West	Mladost Lučani (2)	Borac Čačak	Železničar Lajkovac
2001–02	North	Radnički Obrenovac (1)	Budućnost Banatski Dvor	Novi Sad
2001–02	East	Radnički Niš (2)	Napredak Kruševac	Mladenovac
2001–02	South	Mogren (1)	Budućnost Podgorica	Mornar
2001–02	West	Javor Ivanjica (1)	Borac Čačak	Bane
2002–03	North	Budućnost Banatski Dvor (1)	Mladost Apatin	Radnički Beograd
2002–03	East	Napredak Kruševac (6)	Mladi Radnik	Timok
2002–03	South	Kom (1)	Bokelj	Budućnost Podgorica
2002–03	West	Borac Čačak (3)	Bane	Šumadija 1903
2003–04	North	Radnički Beograd (1)	Mladost Apatin	Novi Sad
2003–04	East	Hajduk Beograd (1)	OFK Niš	Radnički Niš
2003–04	South	Budućnost Podgorica (2)	Bokelj	Grbalj
2003–04	West	Čukarički (2)	Rad	Jedinstvo Ub

=== 2004–2005: Second League – Serbia / Montenegro ===
Season	Region	Champions	Runners-up	Third place
2004–05	Serbia	Budućnost Banatski Dvor (2)	Javor Ivanjica	Rad
2004–05	Montenegro	Jedinstvo Bijelo Polje (1)	Kom	Dečić

=== 2005–2006: First League – Serbia / Montenegro ===
Season	Region	Champions	Runners-up	Third place
2005–06	Serbia	Bežanija	Mladost Apatin	Čukarički
2005–06	Montenegro	Rudar Pljevlja (2)	Sutjeska Nikšić	Kom
