= 1998–99 FR Yugoslavia Cup =

Tournament details
- Country: Yugoslavia
- Teams: 32

Final positions
- Champions: Red Star
- Runners-up: Partizan

Tournament statistics
- Matches played: 43
- Goals scored: 141 (3.28 per match)

The 1998–99 FR Yugoslavia Cup was the seventh season of the FR Yugoslavia's annual football cup. The cup defenders was FK Partizan, but was defeated by Red Star Belgrade in the final.

== First round ==
Thirty-two teams entered in the First Round.

Team 1	Score	Team 2
ČSK Čelarevo (II)	3–4	Partizan
Zemun	3–2	Loznica (II)
Hajduk Kula	2–0	Borac Čačak (II)
Radnički Niš	2–4	Rad
Bečej (II)	1–2	Spartak Subotica
Teleoptik (III)	1–2	Sartid
Trayal Kruševac (III)	1–2	Proleter Zrenjanin
Radnički Kragujevac	1–0	OFK Beograd
Mladost Lučani (II)	3–0	Rudar Pljevlja (II)
Dinamo Pančevo (II)	1–1 (6–5 p)	Priština
Crvena Zvezda Gnjilane (II)	1–3	Železnik
Sutjeska (II)	0–2	Čukarički (II)
Red Star	10–1	Mladost Podgorica (III)
Budućnost Podgorica	2–1	Budućnost Valjevo (II)
Mladi Radnik (II)	0–2	Vojvodina
Obilić	5–1	Radnički JP (II)

Note: Roman numerals in brackets denote the league tier the clubs participated in the 1998–99 season.

== Second round ==
The 16 winners from the prior round enter this round. The first legs were played on 1 and 2 September and the second legs were played on 22, 23 September and 6 October 1998.

Team 1	Agg.	Team 2	1st leg	2nd leg
Spartak Subotica	3–2	Hajduk Kula	3–0	0–2
Budućnost Podgorica	2–3	Sartid	2–2	0–1
Zemun	2–0	Mladost Lučani (II)	0–0	2–0
Železnik	1–11	Red Star	0–4	1–7
Rad	5–1	Dinamo Pančevo (II)	3–0	2–1
Partizan	3–0	Radnički Kragujevac	2–0	1–0
Proleter Zrenjanin	3–5	Vojvodina	2–4	2–1
Čukarički (II)	0–3	Obilić	0–1	0–2

Note: Roman numerals in brackets denote the league tier the clubs participated in the 1998–99 season.

== Quarter-finals ==
The eight winners from the prior round enter this round. The first legs were played on 10 October and the second legs were played on 28 and 29 October 1998.

Team 1	Agg.	Team 2	1st leg	2nd leg
Vojvodina	2–1	Rad	1–0	1–1
Spartak Subotica	2–5	Red Star	0–4	1–3
Partizan	7–1	Zemun	3–0	4–1
Sartid	2–7	Obilić	1–3	1–4

== Semi-finals ==
23 June 1999

Partizan	1–0	Obilić
Kežman 5'	Report

Partizan Stadium, Belgrade
Attendance: 5,000
Referee: Dejan Delević (Belgrade)
23 June 1999

Vojvodina	0–2	Red Star
	Report	Škorić 32' (pen.); Drulić 70'

Karađorđe Stadium, Novi Sad
Attendance: 10,000
Referee: Dragan Tripković (Valjevo)

== Final ==
26 June 1999

Red Star	4–2	Partizan
Škorić 16', 62' (pen.); Pjanović 18'; Gojković 86'	Report	Rašović 37' (pen.); Kežman 45'

Red Star Stadium, Belgrade
Attendance: 35,000
Referee: Krstivoje Filipović (Belgrade)

== See also ==
- 1998–99 First League of FR Yugoslavia
- 1998–99 Second League of FR Yugoslavia
