= 2001–02 Second League of FR Yugoslavia =

Second League of FR Yugoslavia 2001–02 (Serbian: Druga savezna liga) consist of three groups of 18 teams (Serbia) and 1 group of 12 teams (Montenegro).

Due to a reduction in the number of teams in Serbian groups (North, East and West), there were 28 teams relegated (10 in the North Group, 7 in East and 11 in West).

== League table ==
=== North ===
Pos	Team	Pld	W	D	L	GF	GA	GD	Pts	Promotion or relegation
1	Radnički Obrenovac (C, P)	34	22	8	4	47	15	+32	74	Promotion to First League of Serbia and Montenegro
2	Budućnost Banatski Dvor	34	22	5	7	74	30	+44	71	
3	Novi Sad	34	17	14	3	43	24	+19	65	
4	Veternik	34	18	6	10	53	36	+17	60	
5	Dinamo Pančevo	34	17	7	10	60	45	+15	58	
6	Radnički Beograd	34	14	15	5	47	28	+19	57	
7	Bečej	34	17	3	14	51	44	+7	54	
8	Big Bull Bačinci	34	16	5	13	47	39	+8	53 (Note: Head-to-head record: Vrbas – Big Bull Bačinci 1–2, Big Bull Bačinci – Vrbas 3–0.)	
9	Vrbas (R)	34	16	5	13	39	29	+10	53	Relegation to Serbian League
10	Proleter Zrenjanin (R)	34	16	4	14	51	33	+18	52	Relegation to Serbian League
11	ČSK (R)	34	15	4	15	49	47	+2	49	Relegation to Serbian League
12	Železničar Beograd (R)	34	11	9	14	46	47	−1	42	Relegation to Serbian League
13	Balkan Bukovica (R)	34	12	6	16	46	58	−12	42	Relegation to Serbian League
14	Teleoptik (R)	34	12	3	19	49	50	−1	39	Relegation to Serbian League
15	Solunac Karađorđevo (R)	34	8	4	22	35	73	−38	28	Relegation to Serbian League
16	Kabel (R)	34	6	7	21	32	71	−39	25	Relegation to Serbian League
17	Spartak Subotica (R)	34	4	7	23	30	77	−47	19	Relegation to Serbian League
18	Bežanija (R)	34	4	6	24	24	76	−52	18	Relegation to Serbian League

Source: rsssf.org
Rules for classification: 1) points; 2) goal difference; 3) number of goals scored.
(C) Champions; (P) Promoted; (R) Relegated

=== East ===
Pos	Team	Pld	W	D	L	GF	GA	GD	Pts	Promotion or relegation
1	Radnički Niš (C, P)	34	26	5	3	79	27	+52	83	Promotion to First League of Serbia and Montenegro
2	Napredak Kruševac	34	26	4	4	96	24	+72	82	
3	Mladenovac	34	17	12	5	73	38	+35	63	Transfer to Second League - Group West
4	OFK Niš	34	16	8	10	54	38	+16	56	
5	Hajduk Beograd	34	15	10	9	64	44	+20	55	
6	Radnički Pirot	34	16	7	11	63	45	+18	55	
7	Žitorađa	34	16	6	12	51	47	+4	54	
8	BSK Borča	34	15	7	12	66	52	+14	52	
9	Beograd	34	14	10	10	74	51	+23	52	Transfer to Second League - Group North
10	Mladi Radnik (R)	34	15	6	13	64	38	+26	51	Relegation to Serbian League (Note: Mladi Radnik are relegated because they are regrouped into the western group but have a worse record than last non-relegated teams from that group)
11	Dubočica	34	14	6	14	55	60	−5	48	
12	Građanski Svilajnac	34	13	8	13	45	48	−3	47 (Note: Head-to-head record: Napredak Kusiljevo – Građanski Svilajnac 0–3, Građanski Svilajnac – Napredak Kusiljevo 3–1.)	
13	Napredak Kušiljevo (R)	34	13	8	13	49	65	−16	47	Relegation to Serbian League
14	Jedinstvo Paraćin (R)	34	10	6	18	55	85	−30	36	Relegation to Serbian League
15	Trayal Kruševac (R)	34	7	4	23	37	100	−63	25	Relegation to Serbian League
16	Radnički Svilajnac (R)	34	5	6	23	33	83	−50	21	Relegation to Serbian League
17	Železničar Niš (R)	34	4	5	25	36	88	−52	17	Relegation to Serbian League
18	Vučje (R)	34	4	2	28	31	92	−61	14	Relegation to Serbian League

Source: rsssf.org
Rules for classification: 1) points; 2) goal difference; 3) number of goals scored.
(C) Champions; (P) Promoted; (R) Relegated

=== West ===
Pos	Team	Pld	W	D	L	GF	GA	GD	Pts	Promotion or relegation
1	Javor Ivanjica (C, P)	32	27	4	1	81	14	+67	85	Promotion to First League of Serbia and Montenegro
2	Borac Čačak	32	24	5	3	78	27	+51	77	
3	Bane	32	17	6	9	68	31	+37	57	
4	Šumadija 1903	32	16	7	9	56	30	+26	55	
5	Remont Čačak	32	16	6	10	58	39	+19	54	
6	Loznica	32	16	5	11	58	33	+25	53	
7	Radnički Stobex	32	15	8	9	42	32	+10	53	
8	Polet Ljubić (R)	32	15	7	10	46	45	+1	52	Relegation to Serbian League
9	Sloboda Užice (R)	32	14	8	10	44	32	+12	50	Relegation to Serbian League
10	Jedinstvo Ub (R)	32	13	10	9	50	41	+9	49	Relegation to Serbian League
11	Novi Pazar (R)	32	12	5	15	35	48	−13	41	Relegation to Serbian League
12	Železničar Lajkovac (R)	32	12	4	16	42	63	−21	40	Relegation to Serbian League
13	Kolubara (R)	32	8	8	16	42	53	−11	32	Relegation to Serbian League
14	Sloga Kraljevo (R)	32	5	6	21	24	69	−45	21	Relegation to Serbian League
15	GP Zlatibor Užice (R)	32	5	5	22	27	81	−54	20	Relegation to Serbian League
16	Sloga Lipnički Šor (R)	32	3	9	20	25	68	−43	18	Relegation to Serbian League
17	ZSK Valjevo (R)	32	1	3	28	20	90	−70	6	Relegation to Serbian League
18	Zastava Kragujevac (R)	0	0	0	0	0	0	0	0	Withdrew after round 4

Source: rsssf.org
Rules for classification: 1) points; 2) goal difference; 3) number of goals scored.
(C) Champions; (P) Promoted; (R) Relegated

=== South (Montenegro) ===
Pos	Team	Pld	W	D	L	GF	GA	GD	Pts	Promotion or relegation
1	Mogren (C, P)	33	23	5	5	63	26	+37	74	Promotion to First League of Serbia and Montenegro
2	Budućnost Podgorica	33	20	9	4	54	17	+37	69	
3	Mornar	33	19	3	11	69	36	+33	60	
4	Mladost Podgorica	33	14	8	11	45	31	+14	50	
5	Jedinstvo Bijelo Polje	33	14	6	13	60	46	+14	48	
6	Čelik Nikšić	33	13	9	11	47	40	+7	48	
7	Petrovac	33	11	13	9	43	35	+8	46	
8	Zabjelo	33	12	6	15	43	47	−4	42	
9	Lovćen	33	10	8	15	29	45	−16	38	
10	Bokelj	33	9	8	16	38	47	−9	35	
11	Iskra Danilovgrad	33	8	6	19	32	63	−31	30	
12	Ibar (R)	33	4	1	28	12	102	−90	13	Relegation to Montenegrin League

Source: rsssf.org
Rules for classification: 1) points; 2) goal difference; 3) number of goals scored.
(C) Champions; (P) Promoted; (R) Relegated
