= 1996–97 FR Yugoslavia Cup =

Tournament details
- Country: Yugoslavia
- Teams: 32

Final positions
- Champions: Red Star
- Runners-up: Vojvodina

Tournament statistics
- Matches played: 46
- Goals scored: 107 (2.33 per match)

The 1996–97 FR Yugoslavia Cup was the fifth season of the FR Yugoslavia's annual football cup. The cup defenders was Red Star Belgrade, and they were him successfully defended, after they defeated FK Vojvodina in the final.

== First round ==
Team 1	Score	Team 2
Omladinac Goraždevac (?)	0–3	Borac Čačak
Igalo (II)	2–3	Bečej
Obilić	1–0	Napredak Kruševac (II)
Novi Pazar (II)	0–2	Proleter Zrenjanin
OFK Beograd	2–0	Mladost Bački Jarak
Zemun	2–0	Loznica
Novi Sad (II)	1–0	Čukarički
Radnički Sombor (III)	1–2	Budućnost Podgorica
Red Star	4–0	Kom (?)
Cement (II)	0–2	Vojvodina
Hajduk Kula	1–0	Kikinda
Bor (II)	0–1	Radnički Niš
BSK Batajnica (III)	2–1	Partizan
Železnik	1–4	Mladost Lučani
Jedinstvo Paraćin (II)	2–0	Sloboda Užice
Radnički Beograd (II)	2–2 (7–8 p)	Rad

Note: Roman numerals in brackets denote the league tier the clubs participated in the 1996–97 season. Sources: forum.sportsport.ba, ,

== Second round ==
The 16 winners from the prior round enter this round. The first legs were played on 9 October and the second legs were played on 23 October 1996.

Team 1	Agg.	Team 2	1st leg	2nd leg
BSK Batajnica (III)	1–1 (8–7 p)	Budućnost Podgorica	1–0	0–1
Bečej	0–1	Obilić	0–0	0–1
Hajduk Kula	0–2	Red Star	0–2	0–0
Proleter Zrenjanin	5–1	Borac Čačak	4–1	1–0
OFK Beograd	3–6	Mladost Lučani	2–1	1–5
Vojvodina	4–1	Radnički Niš	2–0	2–1
Zemun	2–3	Rad	2–0	0–3
Jedinstvo Paraćin (II)	8–2	Novi Sad (II)	4–1	4–1

Note: Roman numerals in brackets denote the league tier the clubs participated in the 1996–97 season.

== Quarter-finals ==
The eight winners from the prior round enter this round. The first legs were played on 13 November and the second legs were played on 26 and 27 November 1996.

Team 1	Agg.	Team 2	1st leg	2nd leg
BSK Batajnica (III)	2–4	Jedinstvo Paraćin (II)	0–0	2–4
Red Star	3–0	Rad	2–0	1–0
Vojvodina	3–2	Proleter Zrenjanin	1–0	2–2
Obilić	2–1	Mladost Lučani	2–0	0–1

Note: Roman numerals in brackets denote the league tier the clubs participated in the 1996–97 season.

== Semi-finals ==
The eight winners from the prior round enter this round. The first legs were played on 19 March and the second legs were played on 9 April 1997.

19 March 1997

Vojvodina	1–0	Jedinstvo Paraćin (II)
Miloševski 88'

Karađorđe Stadium, Novi Sad
9 April 1997

Jedinstvo Paraćin (II)	0–0	Vojvodina

Paraćin City Stadium, Paraćin
Attendance: 7,000
Referee: Dušan Čolić (Belgrade)

Vojvodina won 1–0 on aggregate.

19 March 1997

Red Star	1–2	Obilić
Mićić 20'		Ranković 41'; Savić 67'

Red Star Stadium, Belgrade
Attendance: 1,500
Referee: Zdravko Savić (Bačka Topola)
9 April 1997

Obilić	1–2	Red Star
Jelić 89'		Mićić 26'; Đorović 85'
Penalties
Lešnjak (penalty scored); Milošević (penalty scored); Šarac (penalty missed); Litera (penalty scored); Juškić (penalty scored)	4–5	(penalty scored) Njeguš; (penalty scored) Vanić; (penalty scored) Stanković; (penalty scored) Radosavljević; (penalty scored) Anić

Obilić Stadium, Belgrade
Attendance: 2,500
Referee: Miroslav Radoman (Vrbas)

2–2 on aggregate. Red Star won 5–4 in penalty shootout.

Note: Roman numerals in brackets denote the league tier the clubs participated in the 1996–97 season.

== Final ==
=== First leg ===
7 May 1997

Vojvodina	0–0	Red Star

Karađorđe Stadium, Novi Sad
Attendance: 8,000
Referee: Miroslav Radoman (Vrbas)

=== Second leg ===
21 May 1997

Red Star	1–0	Vojvodina
Njeguš 85' (pen.)

Red Star Stadium, Belgrade
Attendance: 20,000
Referee: Slavko Radulović (Podgorica)

Red Star won 1–0 on aggregate.

== See also ==
- 1996–97 First League of FR Yugoslavia
- 1996–97 Second League of FR Yugoslavia
