= Nikola Lazetić =

Serbian footballer (born 1978)

Personal information
- Date of birth: 9 February 1978 (age 48)
- Place of birth: Kosovska Mitrovica, SFR Yugoslavia
- Height: 1.75 m (5 ft 9 in)
- Position: Winger

Youth career
- Trepča
- Red Star Belgrade

Senior career*
Years	Team	Apps	(Gls)
1995–1998	Red Star Belgrade	15	(0)
1996	→ Budućnost Valjevo (loan)	8	(2)
1997	→ Hajduk Beograd (loan)		
1997	→ Milicionar (loan)		
1998	→ Železnik (loan)	4	(1)
1998	Vojvodina	12	(0)
1999–2000	Obilić	35	(9)
2000–2002	Fenerbahçe	46	(6)
2002–2003	Como	0	(0)
2002–2003	→ Chievo (loan)	11	(0)
2003	→ Lazio (loan)	5	(0)
2003–2005	Genoa	39	(1)
2003–2004	→ Siena (loan)	31	(2)
2005–2006	Livorno	16	(0)
2006–2008	Torino	57	(0)
2008–2010	Red Star Belgrade	41	(3)
2010–2011	Vojvodina	19	(2)
Total		339	(26)

International career
1997–2000	FR Yugoslavia U21 (Note: Official UEFA matches only)	9	(2)
1998–2003	Serbia and Montenegro	25	(1)
- * Club domestic league appearances and goals

Nikola Lazetić (Serbian Cyrillic: Никола Лазетић; born 9 February 1978) is a Serbian retired footballer who played as a winger. He is currently the President of the Football Association of Belgrade.

== Club career ==
Born in Kosovska Mitrovica, Lazetić started out at his hometown club Trepča. He was later discovered by Tomislav Milićević who brought him to Red Star Belgrade. In December 1995, Lazetić made his league debut for the club in a 5–1 home win over Proleter Zrenjanin. He made three more appearances in the second half of the 1995–96 season. In the summer of 1996, Lazetić was loaned to Budućnost Valjevo, before returning to Red Star in the second part of the 1996–97 season. He also played on dual registration for Hajduk Beograd during the spring of 1997.

In the summer of 1998, Lazetić signed a contract with Vojvodina, helping them reach the 1998 UEFA Intertoto Cup final. He subsequently moved to Obilić in a controversial transfer during the winter of 1999, spending the next year and a half at the club. After his retirement, he confirmed that he had been brought to Obilić against his will.

In May 2000, Lazetić was sold to Turkish club Fenerbahçe for an undisclosed fee. He helped them win the league in his debut season, contributing with five goals in 30 appearances. In his second year, Lazetić appeared in 16 league games and scored once, as the team finished runners-up to Galatasaray.

In June 2002, Lazetić moved to Italy and joined Serie A newcomers Como. He was loaned to Chievo three months later, without making his debut for Como. In January 2003, Lazetić's rights were transferred to Lazio until the end of the season.

In July 2003, Lazetić joined fellow Serie A club Siena on a season-long loan from Como. He was subsequently sold to Serie B side Genoa, but remained on loan at Siena. In August 2005, Lazetić signed a two-year contract with Serie A club Livorno. He later moved to Serie B side Torino in January 2006, helping them win promotion to the top flight. Afterwards, Lazetić spent two more seasons at the club.

In August 2008, Lazetić returned to Serbia and joined his parent club Red Star Belgrade, signing a two-year contract. He captained the side that won the 2009–10 Serbian Cup. In June 2010, Lazetić left the club after failing to agree to a contract extension.

In August 2010, Lazetić signed a one-year deal with his former club Vojvodina. He helped the team reach the 2010–11 Serbian Cup final, before leaving at the end of his contract.

== International career ==
At international level, Lazetić made his debut for Serbia and Montenegro (formerly known as FR Yugoslavia) in a September 1998 friendly match away against Brazil, coming on as a 75th-minute substitute for Predrag Mijatović, and earned a total of 25 caps, scoring 1 goal. His final international was an April 2003 friendly away against Germany.

== Post-playing career ==
In June 2019, Lazetić was appointed as sporting director of Vojvodina.

He was the Director of all youth national teams of Serbia from 2019 to 2025.

He is currently the President of the Football Association of Belgrade.

== Personal life ==
Lazetić is the older brother of fellow former footballer Žarko Lazetić.

Nikola Lazetić is happily married to his wife Sonja, with whom he has four children. His family has been a constant source of strength and support throughout his career. His brother, Žarko Lazetić, is a successful football coach, while his nephew, Marko Lazetić, is a professional football player currently playing for the Scottish club Aberdeen.

== Career statistics ==
=== Club ===
Appearances and goals by club, season and competition
Club	Season	League		
Club	Season	Division	Apps	Goals
Red Star Belgrade	1995–96	First League of FR Yugoslavia	4	0
Red Star Belgrade	1996–97	First League of FR Yugoslavia	11	0
Red Star Belgrade	Total		15	0
Budućnost Valjevo (loan)	1996–97	First League of FR Yugoslavia	8	2
Hajduk Beograd (loan)	1996–97	Second League of FR Yugoslavia		
Milicionar (loan)	1997–98	Second League of FR Yugoslavia		
Železnik (loan)	1997–98	First League of FR Yugoslavia	4	1
Vojvodina	1998–99	First League of FR Yugoslavia	12	0
Obilić	1998–99	First League of FR Yugoslavia	7	2
Obilić	1999–2000	First League of FR Yugoslavia	28	7
Obilić	Total		35	9
Fenerbahçe	2000–01	Süper Lig	30	5
Fenerbahçe	2001–02	Süper Lig	16	1
Fenerbahçe	Total		46	6
Como	2002–03	Serie A	0	0
Chievo (loan)	2002–03	Serie A	11	0
Lazio (loan)	2002–03	Serie A	5	0
Siena (loan)	2003–04	Serie A	31	2
Genoa	2004–05	Serie B	39	1
Livorno	2005–06	Serie A	16	0
Torino	2005–06	Serie B	14	0
Torino	2006–07	Serie A	28	0
Torino	2007–08	Serie A	15	0
Torino	Total		57	0
Red Star Belgrade	2008–09	Serbian SuperLiga	21	3
Red Star Belgrade	2009–10	Serbian SuperLiga	20	0
Red Star Belgrade	Total		41	3
Vojvodina	2010–11	Serbian SuperLiga	19	2
Career total			339	26

=== International ===
Appearances and goals by national team and year
National team	Year	Apps	Goals
FR Yugoslavia	1998	1	0
FR Yugoslavia	1999	0	0
FR Yugoslavia	2000	3	0
FR Yugoslavia	2001	9	0
FR Yugoslavia	2002	9	0
Serbia and Montenegro	2003	3	1
Total		25	1

== Honours ==
Red Star Belgrade

- FR Yugoslavia Cup: 1996–97
- Serbian Cup: 2009–10

Fenerbahçe

- Süper Lig: 2000–01

Individual

- Serbian SuperLiga Team of the Season: 2009–10
