= Zoran Ranković =

Serbian footballer

Personal information
- Full name: Zoran Ranković
- Date of birth: 17 December 1969 (age 56)
- Place of birth: Belgrade, SFR Yugoslavia
- Height: 1.83 m (6 ft 0 in)
- Position: Striker

Youth career
- Red Star Belgrade
- Rakovica

Senior career*
Years	Team	Apps	(Gls)
1991–1992	Rakovica		
1993–1996	Dinamo Pančevo		
1997–2000	Obilić	75	(45)
2000–2001	Shanghai Shenhua	42	(21)
2002	Beijing Guoan	1	(0)
2002–2003	Obilić	25	(3)
2003	Nanjing Yoyo	12	(2)
2004–2005	Hajduk Beograd	16	(1)
2006	Radnički Pirot	3	(0)
2008	Kolubara	9	(1)
Total		183	(73)

International career
1998	FR Yugoslavia	1	(0)
- * Club domestic league appearances and goals

Zoran Ranković (Serbian Cyrillic: Зоран Ранковић; born 17 December 1969) is a Serbian former professional footballer who played as a striker.

== Club career ==
After showing promising displays for Dinamo Pančevo, Ranković gained more attention for his performances with Obilić. He was the leading scorer of the team that won the 1997–98 First League of FR Yugoslavia. In March 2000, Ranković was transferred to Chinese Jia-A League club Shanghai Shenhua, alongside his teammate Saša Viciknez. He spent two seasons with the team, scoring 21 goals in 42 league appearances. After a brief spell with fellow Jia-A side Beijing Guoan, Ranković returned to his homeland and rejoined his former club Obilić.

In late 2003, Ranković moved to China for the second time and played for Jia-B League club Nanjing Yoyo. He later spent one season with newly promoted First League of Serbia and Montenegro side Hajduk Beograd. In early 2006, Ranković joined Second League club Radnički Pirot led by manager Marjan Živković, his former Obilić teammate. He retired from the game after playing for Kolubara in the Serbian League Belgrade.

== International career ==
Ranković made his international debut for FR Yugoslavia on 25 February 1998, playing 55 minutes in a 3–1 away friendly loss against Argentina.

== Honours ==
Obilić

- First League of FR Yugoslavia: 1997–98
- FR Yugoslavia Cup: Runner-up 1997–98
