= Ivan Litera =

Serbian footballer

Personal information
- Full name: Ivan Litera
- Date of birth: 13 February 1976 (age 50)
- Place of birth: Belgrade, SR Serbia, SFR Yugoslavia
- Height: 1.73 m (5 ft 8 in)
- Position: Midfielder

Youth career
- Zemun

Senior career*
Years	Team	Apps	(Gls)
1993–1996	Zemun	18	(0)
1996–1999	Obilić	52	(10)
1999	CSKA Sofia	1	(0)
2000	Velbazhd Kyustendil	10	(5)
2000–2002	Salgueiros	46	(3)
2002–2003	Portimonense	24	(2)
2003–2004	Estrela da Amadora	5	(0)
2005–2007	Zemun	2	(0)
Total		158	(20)

International career
1996–1997	FR Yugoslavia U21	3	(0)
- * Club domestic league appearances and goals

Ivan Litera (Serbian Cyrillic: Иван Литера; born 13 February 1976) is a Serbian former professional footballer who played as a midfielder.

== Club career ==
Litera came through the youth system of Zemun and made his senior debut in the second half of the 1992–93 season. He later played three seasons for Obilić, winning the championship in 1997–98. In the summer of 1999, Litera moved abroad and signed with Bulgarian club CSKA Sofia.

== International career ==
Litera was capped for FR Yugoslavia at under-21 level.

== Career statistics ==
Club	Season	League	
Club	Season	Apps	Goals
Zemun	1992–93	1	0
Zemun	1993–94	2	0
Zemun	1994–95	1	0
Zemun	1995–96	14	0
Zemun	Total	18	0
Obilić	1996–97	25	6
Obilić	1997–98	15	2
Obilić	1998–99	12	2
Obilić	Total	52	10

== Honours ==
Obilić

- First League of FR Yugoslavia: 1997–98
- FR Yugoslavia Cup: Runner-up 1997–98
