= Kuzman Babeu =

Serbian football manager and player

Personal information
- Full name: Kuzman Babeu
- Date of birth: 4 November 1971 (age 54)
- Place of birth: Belgrade, SR Serbia, SFR Yugoslavia
- Height: 1.90 m (6 ft 3 in)
- Position: Centre-back

Youth career
- OFK Beograd
- Beograd

Senior career*
Years	Team	Apps	(Gls)
1991–1992	Beograd		
1992–1995	Trudbenik		
1995–1996	Dinamo Pančevo		
1996–2000	Obilić	100	(9)
2000	Slavia Sofia	6	(1)
2001	Sutjeska Nikšić	7	(0)
2001	Remont Čačak		
2002	Mladost Apatin	9	(0)
2003	Palilulac Beograd		
2004	Henan Construction	27	(1)
2005	Hajduk Beograd	13	(0)
Total		162+	(11+)

Managerial career
- 2011: Balkan Mirijevo
- 2016–2017: Polimlje
- * Club domestic league appearances and goals

Kuzman Babeu (Serbian Cyrillic: Кузман Бабеу; born 4 November 1971) is a Serbian football manager and former player.

== Playing career ==
Regarded as a physical player, Babeu, who has Romanian ancestry, is best remembered for his time at Obilić, between 1996 and 2000, during Arkan's ownership of the club. He was one of the most regular members of the team that controversially won the 1997–98 First League of FR Yugoslavia. In the summer of 2000, Babeu was close to signing with Red Star Belgrade. However, according to Babeu, the club's president, Dragan Džajić, eventually decided to pull out of the deal due to Babeu's mature age. After leaving Obilić, Babeu briefly played for Slavia Sofia (2000), Sutjeska Nikšić (2001), Remont Čačak (2001), Mladost Apatin (2002), Palilulac Beograd (2003), Henan Construction (2004), and Hajduk Beograd (2005).

== Managerial career ==
After hanging up his boots, Babeu served as manager of several lower league clubs, including Serbian League Belgrade's Balkan Mirijevo and Drina Zone League's Polimlje.

== Career statistics ==
Club	Season	League	
Club	Season	Apps	Goals
Obilić	1996–97	21	0
Obilić	1997–98	29	4
Obilić	1998–99	18	3
Obilić	1999–2000	32	2
Obilić	Total	100	9

== Honours ==
Obilić

- First League of FR Yugoslavia: 1997–98
- FR Yugoslavia Cup: Runner-up 1997–98
