= Živojin Juškić =

Serbian football manager and player

Personal information
- Full name: Živojin Juškić
- Date of birth: 16 December 1969 (age 56)
- Place of birth: Zaječar, SR Serbia, SFR Yugoslavia
- Height: 1.75 m (5 ft 9 in)
- Position: Defensive midfielder

Senior career*
Years	Team	Apps	(Gls)
- Radnički Beograd
- Zvezdara
1995–1996	Dinamo Pančevo		
1996–1998	Obilić	65	(7)
1999	1. FC Nürnberg	3	(0)
1999–2000	Greuther Fürth	10	(0)
2000–2007	Darmstadt 98	181	(3)
Total		259+	(10+)

Managerial career
- 2003: Darmstadt 98 (caretaker)
- 2009–2010: Darmstadt 98
- 2011–2016: TS Ober-Roden
- 2017–2018: TS Ober-Roden
- * Club domestic league appearances and goals

Živojin Juškić (Serbian Cyrillic: Живојин Јушкић; born 16 December 1969) is a Serbian football manager and former player.

== Playing career ==
In the summer of 1996, Juškić was one of the players transferred from Dinamo Pančevo to Obilić. He eventually captained the team that surprisingly won the 1997–98 First League of FR Yugoslavia. In January 1999, Juškić moved abroad to Bundesliga side 1. FC Nürnberg, appearing in three games until the end of the season. He subsequently spent one year at Greuther Fürth, making 10 appearances in the Zweite Bundesliga. In the summer of 2000, Juškić switched to Regionalliga Süd side Darmstadt 98. He spent the rest of his career with the club, amassing over 150 appearances in seven years.

== Managerial career ==
In April 2003, while recovering from injury, Juškić was set to replace Hans-Werner Moser at the helm of Darmstadt 98 as interim player-manager. He again served as manager of Darmstadt 98 from 2009 to 2010.

Juškić was manager of TS Ober-Roden from 2011 to 2016. He subsequently served as the club's sporting director, before retaking the managerial role in late 2017.

== Career statistics ==
Club	Season	League	
Club	Season	Apps	Goals
Obilić	1996–97	26	3
Obilić	1997–98	28	4
Obilić	1998–99	11	0
Obilić	Total	65	7

== Honours ==
Obilić

- First League of FR Yugoslavia: 1997–98
- FR Yugoslavia Cup: Runner-up 1997–98
