= Dražen Bolić =

Serbian footballer

Personal information
- Full name: Dražen Bolić
- Date of birth: 12 September 1971 (age 55)
- Place of birth: Karlovac, SFR Yugoslavia
- Height: 1.84 m (6 ft 0 in)
- Position: Defender

Youth career
- Duga Resa

Senior career*
Years	Team	Apps	(Gls)
1993–1994	Obilić		
1994–1998	Partizan	90	(19)
1998–2001	Salernitana	85	(3)
2001–2004	Ancona	83	(4)
2004–2005	Vicenza	19	(0)
2005–2009	Lanciano	97	(8)
Total		374	(34)

International career
1995–2000	FR Yugoslavia	7	(0)

Managerial career
- 2015–2016: Partizan (assistant)
- 2020–2021: Metalac Gornji Milanovac (assistant)
- 2021–2024: TSC (assistant)
- * Club domestic league appearances and goals

Dražen Bolić (Serbian Cyrillic: Дражен Болић; born 12 September 1971) is a Serbian former footballer who played as a defender.

== Club career ==
After playing for Obilić, Bolić was transferred to Partizan in 1994, spending the next four seasons with the Crno-beli. He then went abroad to Italy and signed with Serie A club Salernitana in 1998. In his debut season, Bolić played regularly for the side, but the club failed to avoid relegation to Serie B. He spent the following 10 years in the country, also playing for Ancona, Vicenza, and Lanciano.

== International career ==
At international level, Bolić was capped seven times for FR Yugoslavia between 1995 and 2000, making his debut in a 2–0 friendly loss to Greece.

== Post-playing career ==
After hanging up his boots, Bolić served as assistant manager to Ivan Tomić at Partizan from 2015 to 2016. He also worked as an assistant to Žarko Lazetić at Metalac Gornji Milanovac and TSC.

== Career statistics ==
Appearances and goals by national team and year
National team	Year	Apps	Goals
FR Yugoslavia	1995	1	0
FR Yugoslavia	1996	1	0
FR Yugoslavia	1997	2	0
FR Yugoslavia	1998	0	0
FR Yugoslavia	1999	2	0
FR Yugoslavia	2000	1	0
Total		7	0

== Honours ==
Partizan

- First League of FR Yugoslavia: 1995–96, 1996–97
- FR Yugoslavia Cup: 1997–98
