= Marjan Živković =

Serbian football manager and player

Personal information
- Full name: Marjan Živković
- Date of birth: 21 May 1973 (age 53)
- Place of birth: Pirot, SR Serbia, SFR Yugoslavia
- Height: 1.78 m (5 ft 10 in)
- Position: Midfielder

Senior career*
Years	Team	Apps	(Gls)
1990–1992	Radnički Pirot		
1992–1993	Mogren Budva	9	(0)
1993	Radnički Niš	5	(0)
1994	Red Star Belgrade	1	(0)
1994–1999	Obilić	128	(11)
1999–2000	Litex Lovech	17	(0)
2000–2001	Železnik	28	(1)
2001–2002	OFK Beograd	2	(0)
2002–2003	Obilić	0	(0)
2003	Nanjing Yoyo	9	(1)
2004–2005	Hajduk Beograd	20	(3)
Total		219	(16)

Managerial career
- 2005–2006: Radnički Pirot
- 2006–2007: Obilić
- 2008: Kolubara
- 2009: Radnički Pirot
- 2012: Hajduk Beograd
- 2015–2017: Radnički Pirot
- 2017–2018: Novi Pazar
- 2018: Shenyang Dongjin
- 2018: Belasica
- 2019: Al-Shamal (assistant)
- 2020–2021: Al-Shabab
- 2021–2022: Al-Suwaiq
- 2022: Al-Orouba
- 2023–2024: Dubočica
- * Club domestic league appearances and goals

Marjan Živković (Serbian Cyrillic: Марјан Живковић; born 21 May 1973) is a Serbian football manager and former player.

== Playing career ==
After a brief stint at Red Star Belgrade, Živković joined Obilić in 1994. He was a regular member of the team that won the championship in the 1997–98 season. In 1999, Živković was transferred to Bulgarian club Litex Lovech, alongside Nebojša Jelenković.

== Managerial career ==
After hanging up his boots, Živković started his managerial career at his parent club Radnički Pirot.

From November 2021 to March 2022, Živković served as manager of Omani club Al-Suwaiq.

== Career statistics ==
Club	Season	League	
Club	Season	Apps	Goals
Obilić	1994–95	30	1
Obilić	1995–96	21	1
Obilić	1996–97	29	0
Obilić	1997–98	28	7
Obilić	1998–99	20	2
Obilić	Total	128	11

== Honours ==
Obilić

- First League of FR Yugoslavia: 1997–98
- FR Yugoslavia Cup runner-up: 1994–95, 1997–98
