= Viktor Trenevski =

Macedonian football manager and player

Personal information
- Full name: Viktor Trenevski
- Date of birth: 8 October 1972 (age 54)
- Place of birth: Skopje, SR Macedonia, SFR Yugoslavia
- Height: 1.72 m (5 ft 8 in)
- Position: Attacking midfielder

Team information
- Current team: Balkan Eagles (manager)

Senior career*
| Years | Team | Apps | (Gls) |
| 1991–1994 | Budućnost Podgorica | 94 | (14) |
| 1995–1998 | Partizan | 88 | (19) |
| 1998 | Puebla | 9 | (1) |
| 1999 | Sileks | | |
| 2000 | Pelister | 12 | (2) |
| 2002–2003 | Mura | 28 | (9) |
| 2003–2004 | Koper | 21 | (7) |
| 2005 | Olimpija Ljubljana | 13 | (4) |
| 2005–2006 | Drava Ptuj | 45 | (17) |
| 2007–2008 | Nafta Lendava | 30 | (7) |
| 2008 | Malečnik | 2 | (1) |
| Total | | 342+ | (81+) |

International career
| 1997–2004 | Macedonia | 17 | (0) |

Managerial career
- 2011: Malečnik
- 2011–2012: Veržej
- 2013–2014: Zavrč
- 2015–2016: Dečić
- 2016–2017: Rabotnički
- 2018: Dečić
- 2018–2020: Kom
- 2020–2021: Drava Ptuj
- 2021: Kom
- 2021–2022: Grbalj
- 2022–2025: Partizan Bar
- 2025–: Balkan Eagles
- * Club domestic league appearances and goals

Viktor Trenevski (Macedonian: Виктор Треневски; born 8 October 1972) is a Macedonian football manager and former player.

A former Macedonia international, Trenevski made 17 appearances for his nation between 1997 and 2004.

== Club career ==
Born in Skopje, Trenevski moved at an early age to Titograd, where his father was stationed in the Yugoslav People's Army. He started out with local club Budućnost, making his senior debut in the 1991–92 season. In the 1995 winter transfer window, Trenevski was transferred to Partizan. He remained with the Crno-beli for three and a half years, winning two national championships (1996 and 1997) and one national cup (1998). In the summer of 1998, Trenevski moved abroad and joined Mexican club Puebla. He subsequently went on trial to Brazilian club Fluminense in 1999, without signing a contract.

In the summer of 2002, Trenevski moved to Slovenia and signed with Mura. He went on to play for four other Slovenian clubs in the top flight, amassing 137 appearances and scoring 44 league goals over the course of six years. Before retiring from the game, Trenevski also played for Slovenian Third League club Malečnik in the 2008–09 season.

== International career ==
At international level, Trenevski was capped 17 times for the Macedonia national team, making his debut in a 1–0 win over Iceland on 7 June 1997. His last cap came in a 1–0 friendly loss to China on 29 January 2004.

== Managerial career ==
After starting his managerial career with his former club Malečnik, Trenevski was appointed manager of Slovenian Third League side Veržej in November 2011. He subsequently took charge at Slovenian Second League club Zavrč in January 2013, immediately leading them to promotion to the top flight of Slovenian football. Despite the team's initial success, Trenevski eventually left the club by mutual consent in March 2014.

In July 2015, Trenevski returned to the country of his childhood to take charge of Dečić. He was suspended by the Montenegrin FA in October 2015, receiving a six-month ban due to issues regarding his UEFA Pro Licence. In May 2016, Trenevski parted ways with the club.

On 19 July 2016, Trenevski was appointed manager of Rabotnički, replacing Tomislav Franc, following the club's elimination from the 2016–17 UEFA Europa League.

== Career statistics ==
=== Club ===
Appearances and goals by club, season and competition
| Club | Season | League | | | Cup | | Continental | | Total | |
| Club | Season | Division | Apps | Goals | Apps | Goals | Apps | Goals | Apps | Goals |
|---|---|---|---|---|---|---|---|---|---|---|
| Budućnost Podgorica | 1991–92 | Yugoslav First League | 12 | 0 | | | — | | 12 | 0 |
| Budućnost Podgorica | 1992–93 | First League of FR Yugoslavia | 34 | 6 | | | — | | 34 | 6 |
| Budućnost Podgorica | 1993–94 | First League of FR Yugoslavia | 33 | 6 | | | — | | 33 | 6 |
| Budućnost Podgorica | 1994–95 | First League of FR Yugoslavia | 15 | 2 | | | — | | 15 | 2 |
| Budućnost Podgorica | Total | | 94 | 14 | | | — | | 94 | 14 |
| Partizan | 1994–95 | First League of FR Yugoslavia | 17 | 2 | 0 | 0 | — | | 17 | 2 |
| Partizan | 1995–96 | First League of FR Yugoslavia | 24 | 6 | 7 | 1 | — | | 31 | 7 |
| Partizan | 1996–97 | First League of FR Yugoslavia | 26 | 7 | 1 | 0 | 3 | 1 | 30 | 8 |
| Partizan | 1997–98 | First League of FR Yugoslavia | 21 | 4 | 7 | 3 | 0 | 0 | 28 | 7 |
| Partizan | Total | | 88 | 19 | 15 | 4 | 3 | 1 | 106 | 24 |
| Mura | 2002–03 | Slovenian First League | 28 | 9 | 2 | 1 | — | | 30 | 10 |
| Koper | 2003–04 | Slovenian First League | 19 | 7 | 0 | 0 | 7 | 6 | 26 | 13 |
| Koper | 2004–05 | Slovenian First League | 2 | 0 | 0 | 0 | — | | 2 | 0 |
| Koper | Total | | 21 | 7 | 0 | 0 | 7 | 6 | 28 | 13 |
| Olimpija Ljubljana | 2004–05 | Slovenian First League | 13 | 4 | 0 | 0 | — | | 13 | 4 |
| Drava Ptuj | 2005–06 | Slovenian First League | 31 | 15 | 1 | 1 | 2 | 0 | 34 | 16 |
| Drava Ptuj | 2006–07 | Slovenian First League | 14 | 2 | 0 | 0 | — | | 14 | 2 |
| Drava Ptuj | Total | | 45 | 17 | 1 | 1 | 2 | 0 | 48 | 18 |
| Nafta Lendava | 2006–07 | Slovenian First League | 14 | 1 | 0 | 0 | — | | 14 | 1 |
| Nafta Lendava | 2007–08 | Slovenian First League | 16 | 6 | 1 | 0 | — | | 17 | 6 |
| Nafta Lendava | Total | | 30 | 7 | 1 | 0 | — | | 31 | 7 |
| Malečnik | 2008–09 | Slovenian Third League | 2 | 1 | 0 | 0 | — | | 2 | 1 |
| Career total | | | 321 | 78 | 19 | 6 | 12 | 7 | 352 | 91 |

=== International ===
Appearances and goals by national team and year
| National team | Year | Apps | Goals |
|---|---|---|---|
| Macedonia | 1997 | 4 | 0 |
| Macedonia | 1998 | 8 | 0 |
| Macedonia | 1999 | 3 | 0 |
| Macedonia | 2000 | 0 | 0 |
| Macedonia | 2001 | 0 | 0 |
| Macedonia | 2002 | 0 | 0 |
| Macedonia | 2003 | 0 | 0 |
| Macedonia | 2004 | 2 | 0 |
| Total | | 17 | 0 |

== Honours ==
=== Player ===
Partizan

- First League of FR Yugoslavia: 1995–96, 1996–97
- FR Yugoslavia Cup: 1997–98

=== Manager ===
Zavrč

- Slovenian Second League: 2012–13
