= Ivan Tomić =

Serbian footballer and manager

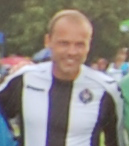
- Tomić in 2010

Personal information
- Full name: Ivan Tomić
- Date of birth: 5 January 1976 (age 50)
- Place of birth: Belgrade, SFR Yugoslavia
- Height: 1.81 m (5 ft 11 1/2 in)
- Position: Midfielder

Youth career
- Radnički Beograd

Senior career*
Years	Team	Apps	(Gls)
1993–1998	Partizan	82	(24)
1998–2003	Roma	15	(0)
2000–2001	→ Alavés (loan)	29	(2)
2003	→ Alavés (loan)	10	(1)
2003–2004	Rayo Vallecano	5	(0)
2004–2007	Partizan	51	(4)
Total		192	(31)

International career
1996–1997	FR Yugoslavia U21 (Note: Only official UEFA matches included)	6	(3)
1998–2001	FR Yugoslavia	5	(0)

Managerial career
- 2014: Serbia (assistant)
- 2014–2015: Serbia U19
- 2015: Teleoptik
- 2015–2016: Partizan
- * Club domestic league appearances and goals

Ivan Tomić (Serbian Cyrillic: Иван Томић; born 5 January 1976) is a Serbian football manager and former player.

== Club career ==
After coming through the youth categories of Radnički Beograd, Tomić joined Partizan in the summer of 1993, aged 17. He made his debut for the club during the 1993–94 season, as they won the double. Tomić made a couple of appearances in his first two seasons as a senior, before becoming a first team regular in the 1995–96 season. He subsequently became one of the club's key players, scoring 10 league goals in the 1996–97 season. After the departure of Dragan Ćirić to Barcelona in the summer of 1997, Tomić became the club's captain, aged 21, leading the team to the national cup success in the 1997–98 campaign.

In the 1998 summer transfer window, Tomić was transferred to Italian club Roma. He struggled to become a first team regular under both Zdeněk Zeman and Fabio Capello. In July 2000, Tomić was loaned to Spanish club Alavés. He finally found his old form, helping the side reach the 2000–01 UEFA Cup final, eventually lost 4–5 to Liverpool in a remarkable game. Tomić subsequently returned to Roma, still failing to make an impact at the club. He was again loaned to Alavés in January 2003 until the end of the season. After failing to help them avoid relegation from La Liga, Tomić became a free agent after his contract with Roma expired. He later signed a one-year deal with Rayo Vallecano, another club that suffered relegation to Segunda División in 2003.

In May 2004, Tomić returned to Partizan, penning a three-year deal. He helped the club win the national championship title in his comeback season, as well as to reach the 2004–05 UEFA Cup round of 16. In the next two seasons, Tomić was often sidelined due to injuries, eventually retiring at the end of his contract with Partizan.

== International career ==
Tomić made his senior international debut for FR Yugoslavia on 25 February 1998, coming on as a substitute for Nenad Grozdić in a 1–3 away loss to Argentina. He failed to make another national team appearance until 2001, before receiving a call up by Milovan Đorić. In total, Tomić earned five caps for FR Yugoslavia between 1998 and 2001.

== Post-playing career ==
Immediately after ending his playing career, Tomić became the director of football at Partizan, replacing Nenad Bjeković after almost two decades in charge. He was responsible for the signings of such players as Juca, Lamine Diarra and Almami Moreira, leading to the club's long-term dominance in the country. In December 2009, after the club's presidential election, Tomić resigned from the position by mutual consent.

In May 2014, together with Gordan Petrić, Tomić was named as assistant to Serbia caretaker Ljubinko Drulović. He subsequently led the Serbia U19s, but failed to qualify the team for the 2015 UEFA Under-19 Championship. In October 2015, Tomić took charge at Teleoptik.

In December 2015, Tomić was appointed manager of Partizan. He won the Serbian Cup in May 2016, while finishing second in the league. On 31 July 2016, after poor results early into the new season, Tomić resigned from the position.

== Statistics ==
National team	Year	Apps	Goals
FR Yugoslavia	1998	1	0
FR Yugoslavia	1999	0	0
FR Yugoslavia	2000	0	0
FR Yugoslavia	2001	4	0
Total		5	0

== Managerial statistics ==
As of match played 29 June 2022

Team	Nat	From	To	Record				
Team	Nat	From	To	G	W	D	L	Win %
Serbia U19	(Serbia)	August 2014	June 2015	8	5	1	2	62.50
Teleoptik	(Serbia)	October 2015	December 2015	8	3	0	5	37.50
Partizan	(Serbia)	December 2015	August 2016	23	13	4	6	56.52
Total				39	21	5	13	53.85

== Honours ==
=== Player ===
Partizan

- First League of FR Yugoslavia: 1993–94, 1995–96, 1996–97, 2004–05
- FR Yugoslavia Cup: 1993–94, 1997–98

Roma

- Supercoppa Italiana: 2001

Alavés

- UEFA Cup: Runner-up 2000–01

=== Manager ===
Partizan

- Serbian Cup: 2015–16
