= Saša Kovačević (footballer) =

Serbian footballer

Personal information
- Full name: Saša Kovačević
- Date of birth: 29 March 1973 (age 53)
- Place of birth: Belgrade, SR Serbia, SFR Yugoslavia
- Height: 1.68 m (5 ft 6 in)
- Position: Forward

Youth career
- Radnički Beograd

Senior career*
Years	Team	Apps	(Gls)
1993–1996	Radnički Beograd	50	(8)
1993–1994	→ Hajduk Beograd (loan)		
1996–2000	Obilić	93	(27)
1999	→ CSKA Sofia (loan)	0	(0)
2000–2001	Erzurumspor	26	(7)
2001	Malatyaspor	8	(0)
2002	Železnik	7	(2)
2003–2004	Radnički Beograd		
2004–2005	Turan Tovuz	30	(3)
2006	Olimpik Baku	9	(2)
2007	Hajduk Beograd	4	(0)
2008	Kolubara		
Total		227	(49)

International career
1998	FR Yugoslavia	1	(0)
- * Club domestic league appearances and goals

Saša Kovačević (Serbian Cyrillic: Саша Ковачевић; born 29 March 1973) is a Serbian former professional footballer who played as a forward.

== Club career ==
After starting out at Radnički Beograd, Kovačević joined Obilić in 1996. He was a regular member of the team that won the 1997–98 First League of FR Yugoslavia. In 1999, Kovačević briefly played for Bulgarian club CSKA Sofia, before returning to Obilić, alongside Dragan Šarac.

In August 2000, Kovačević was transferred to Turkish club Erzurumspor, alongside his teammate Milorad Korać, but departed in May 2001. He subsequently joined Super Lig rivals Malatyaspor.

== International career ==
Kovačević made his international debut for FR Yugoslavia on 23 December 1998, coming on as a second-half substitute for Dejan Savićević in a 2–0 away friendly loss to Israel.

== Career statistics ==
Club	Season	League	
Club	Season	Apps	Goals
Obilić	1996–97	23	9
Obilić	1997–98	30	7
Obilić	1998–99	22	9
Obilić	1999–2000	18	2
Obilić	Total	93	27

== Honours ==
Obilić

- First League of FR Yugoslavia: 1997–98
- FR Yugoslavia Cup runner-up: 1997–98
