= Nenad Lukić =

Serbian footballer

Personal information
- Full name: Nenad Lukić
- Date of birth: 14 December 1968
- Place of birth: Leskovac, SFR Yugoslavia
- Date of death: 10 February 2014 (aged 45)
- Place of death: Belgrade, Serbia
- Height: 1.83 m (6 ft 0 in)
- Position: Goalkeeper

Youth career
- Dubočica

Senior career*
Years	Team	Apps	(Gls)
1989–1992	Dubočica		
1992–1994	Topličanin		
1994–1996	Napredak Kruševac	20	(0)
1996–1999	Obilić	67	(0)
1999	CSKA Sofia	0	(0)
1999–2000	Sutjeska Nikšić	21	(0)
2000–2001	Sartid Smederevo	30	(0)
2001–2002	CSKA Sofia	30	(0)
2002–2003	Spartak Varna	1	(0)
Total		169	(0)
- * Club domestic league appearances and goals

Nenad Lukić (Serbian Cyrillic: Ненад Лукић; 14 December 1968 – 10 February 2014) was a Serbian footballer who played as a goalkeeper.

== Club career ==
After spending two seasons with Napredak Kruševac, Lukić became best known for his spell at Obilić and was the team's starting goalkeeper (appearing in 32 of 33 games) in the title-winning 1997–98 season. He subsequently set the league record for the longest time without conceding a goal (over 900 minutes) during the NATO bombing-suspended 1998–99 season. Later on, Lukić played for Bulgarian club CSKA Sofia on two occasions.

== International career ==
In March 1999, Lukić received his first call-up to the FR Yugoslavia national team by manager Milan Živadinović, but remained uncapped.

== Death ==
Lukić died on 10 February 2014 at the age of 45 after a long illness.

== Honours ==
Obilić

- First League of FR Yugoslavia: 1997–98
