= Saša Kovačević =

Saša Kovačević may refer to:

- Saša Kovačević (footballer)
- Saša Kovačević (singer)
