= Zoran Radosavljević =

Zoran Radosavljević may refer to:

- Zoran Radosavljević (footballer) (born 1968), Serbian footballer
- Zoran Radosavljević (pilot) (1965–1999), Yugoslav fighter pilot
