= 1997–98 FR Yugoslavia Cup =

Tournament details
- Country: Yugoslavia
- Teams: 32

Final positions
- Champions: Partizan
- Runners-up: Obilić

Tournament statistics
- Matches played: 46
- Goals scored: 160 (3.48 per match)

The 1997–98 FR Yugoslavia Cup was the sixth season of the FR Yugoslavia's annual football cup. The cup defenders was Red Star Belgrade, but was defeated by FK Obilić in the semi-finals. FK Partizan has the winner of the competition, after they defeated FK Obilić.

== First round ==
Thirty-two teams entered in the first round. The matches were played on 3 September 1997.

Team 1	Score	Team 2
Mladost Apatin (II)	2–3	Obilić
Borac Čačak	0–1	Sutjeska
Rad	2–0	Javor (II)
Čelik Nikšić (II)	3–4	Vojvodina
Spartak Subotica	4–3	Mladost Lučani
Hajduk Kula	2–1	Kikinda (II)
Sloboda Užice (II)	0–3	Partizan
Bečej	2–0	Solunac Karađorđevo (II)
Sartid	1–0	Proleter Zrenjanin
Priština	3–0	Zemun
Loznica	4–2	Budućnost Valjevo
Mladost Bački Jarak (II)	1–7	Čukarički
Radnički Niš	4–1	Rudar Pljevlja
Vrbas (III)	1–0	Železnik
Budućnost Podgorica	2–1	OFK Beograd
Red Star	9–1	Hajduk Beograd (II)

Note: Roman numerals in brackets denote the league tier the clubs participated in the 1997–98 season.

== Second round ==
The 16 winners from the prior round enter this round.

Team 1	Agg.	Team 2	1st leg	2nd leg
Obilić	3–3 (a)	Priština	1–0	2–3
Red Star	6–0	Loznica	3–0	3–0
Spartak Subotica	3–1	Bečej	3–1	0–0
Vrbas (III)	2–5	Hajduk Kula	1–5	1–0
Čukarički	8–0	Budućnost Podgorica	3–0	5–0
Sartid	2–1	Radnički Niš	1–1	1–0
Partizan	5–0	Rad	3–0	2–0
Sutjeska	1–6	Vojvodina	1–1	0–5

Note: Roman numerals in brackets denote the league tier the clubs participated in the 1997–98 season.

== Quarter-finals ==
The eight winners from the prior round enter this round. The first legs were played on 19 November and the second legs were played on 3 December 1997.

Team 1	Agg.	Team 2	1st leg	2nd leg
Čukarički	3–8	Partizan	2–5	1–3
Red Star	5–4	Spartak Subotica	4–3	1–1
Sartid 1913	3–6	Vojvodina	2–1	1–5
Hajduk Kula	2–4	Obilić	1–1	1–3

== Semi-finals ==
The eight winners from the prior round enter this round. The first legs were played on 18 March and the second legs were played on 1 April 1998.

18 March 1998

Red Star	2–0	Obilić
Pantelić 12'; Stanković 56'

Red Star Stadium, Belgrade
Attendance: 8,000
Referee: Dejan Delević (Belgrade)
1 April 1998

Obilić	2–0	Red Star
Grozdić 36'; Kovačević 70'
Penalties
Litera (penalty scored); Viciknez (penalty scored); Živković (penalty scored); Garčević (penalty scored); Vukomanović (penalty scored); Savić (penalty scored)	6–5	(penalty scored) Škorić; (penalty scored) Marković; (penalty scored) Pantelić; (penalty scored) Mićić; (penalty scored) D. Ilić; (penalty missed) Marinović

Obilić Stadium, Belgrade
Attendance: 3,000
Referee: Petar Savanović (Omoljica)

2–2 on aggregate. Obilić won 6–5 in penalty shootout.

18 March 1998

Partizan	4–1	Vojvodina
Isailović 27', 36', 77'; S. Ilić 87'		Mudrinić 90'

Partizan Stadium, Belgrade
Attendance: 1,000
Referee: Milan Vidić (Užice)
1 April 1998

Vojvodina	1–0	Partizan
Vasić 37'

Karađorđe Stadium, Novi Sad
Attendance: 5,000
Referee: Dragan Tripković (Valjevo)

Partizan won 4–2 on aggregate.

== Final ==
=== First leg ===
6 May 1998

Obilić	0–0	Partizan
	Report

FK Obilić Stadium, Belgrade
Attendance: 1,000
Referee: Slavko Radulović (Podgorica)

=== Second leg ===
13 May 1998

Partizan	2–0	Obilić
Trenevski 24'; Obradović 56'	Report

Partizan Stadium, Belgrade
Attendance: 10,000
Referee: Milan Vidić (Užice)

Partizan won 2–0 on aggregate.

== See also ==
- 1997–98 First League of FR Yugoslavia
- 1997–98 Second League of FR Yugoslavia
