= Zoran Jovičić =

Zoran Jovičić may refer to:

- Zoran Jovičić (footballer)
- Zoran Jovičić (handballer)
