= Babeu =

Babeu is a surname. Notable people with the surname include:

- Kuzman Babeu (born 1971), Serbian footballer and manager
- Paul Babeu (born 1969), American politician
