= Saša Marković (footballer, born 1971) =

Serbian footballer

Personal information
- Full name: Saša Marković
- Date of birth: 17 September 1971 (age 55)
- Place of birth: Niš, SR Serbia, SFR Yugoslavia
- Height: 1.80 m (5 ft 11 in)
- Position: Striker

Youth career
- Radnički Niš

Senior career*
Years	Team	Apps	(Gls)
1993–1994	Jastrebac Niš	9	(5)
1994–1996	Čukarički	35+	(13+)
1997	Železnik	30	(23)
1998	Red Star Belgrade	11	(14)
1998–2000	VfB Stuttgart	4	(1)
2000–2001	Železnik	31	(18)
2002	MTK Hungária	1	(0)
2003	Radnički Niš		
2004	OFK Niš		
2004	Radnički Niš	18	(10)
2005	Železničar Niš		
2006–2007	Radnički Niš	24	(7)
Total		163+	(91+)
- * Club domestic league appearances and goals

Saša Marković (Serbian Cyrillic: Саша Марковић; born 17 September 1971) is a Serbian former professional footballer who played as a striker. He led the First League of FR Yugoslavia in scoring during the 1997–98 season and is one of the league's all-time leading scorers. Marković also had two unassuming spells abroad, in Germany and Hungary.

== Career ==
Marković made his First League of FR Yugoslavia debut with Jastrebac Niš in the 1993–94 season, as the club suffered relegation to the Second League. He later moved to Čukarički and scored 13 goals in the 1995–96 First League of FR Yugoslavia. During the 1997 winter transfer window, Marković switched to fellow First League side Železnik and netted 10 goals in the remainder of the 1996–97 campaign.

After bagging 13 goals for Železnik in the first half of the 1997–98 First League of FR Yugoslavia, Marković was transferred to Red Star Belgrade. He continued his scoring form in the second half of the season, netting 14 more times and becoming the league's top scorer with 27 goals in total.

In the summer of 1998, Marković was sold to Bundesliga club VfB Stuttgart. He appeared in four games and scored once in his debut season. In the summer of 2000, Marković rejoined his former club Železnik. He managed to quickly refound his form, tallying 18 goals in the 2000–01 season. In early 2002, Marković moved abroad for the second time and signed with Hungarian side MTK Hungária.

In the summer of 2003, Marković joined his hometown club Radnički Niš to play in the Second League of Serbia and Montenegro. He later spent some time with OFK Niš (Second League) and Železničar Niš (Serbian League). During the 2006 winter transfer window, Marković returned to Radnički Niš.

== Career statistics ==
Club	Season	League	
Club	Season	Apps	Goals
Jastrebac Niš	1993–94	9	5
Čukarički	1994–95		
Čukarički	1995–96	30	13
Čukarički	1996–97	5	0
Čukarički	Total	35	13
Železnik	1996–97	14	10
Železnik	1997–98	16	13
Železnik	Total	30	23
Red Star Belgrade	1997–98	11	14
VfB Stuttgart	1998–99	4	1
Železnik	2000–01	31	18
MTK Hungária	2001–02	1	0
Radnički Niš	2003–04		
OFK Niš	2003–04		
Radnički Niš	2004–05	18	10
Železničar Niš	2004–05		
Železničar Niš	2005–06		
Železničar Niš	Total		
Radnički Niš	2005–06	16	4
Radnički Niš	2006–07	8	3
Radnički Niš	Total	24	7
Career total		163	91

== Honours ==
- First League of FR Yugoslavia Top Scorer: 1997–98
