= Darko Vargec =

Serbian footballer

Personal information
- Date of birth: 1 August 1972 (age 54)
- Place of birth: Bačko Polje, SFR Yugoslavia
- Height: 1.81 m (5 ft 11 1/2 in)
- Position: Centre back

Youth career
- Bačko Polje
- Kabel
- Vojvodina

Senior career*
Years	Team	Apps	(Gls)
1994–1997	Novi Sad	56	(0)
1997–2005	Obilić	186	(2)
Total		242	(2)

Managerial career
- 2006: Obilić
- 2012: Arema Malang (assistant)
- 2013–2015: Pelita Bandung Raya (assistant)
- 2016: Persib Bandung (assistant)
- 2016–xxxx: South China (assistant)
- * Club domestic league appearances and goals

Darko Vargec (Serbian Cyrillic: Дарко Варгец; born 1 August 1972) is a retired Serbian footballer that was for many years the team captain of the 1997–98 Yugoslav champions FK Obilić.

== Honours ==
Obilić

- First League of FR Yugoslavia Champion: 1997-98
