= Dragan Isailović =

Serbian footballer

Personal information
- Full name: Dragan Isailović
- Date of birth: 12 January 1976 (age 50)
- Place of birth: Belgrade, SR Serbia, SFR Yugoslavia
- Height: 1.80 m (5 ft 11 in)
- Position: Striker

Senior career*
Years	Team	Apps	(Gls)
1992–1994	Radnički Obrenovac	32	(13)
1994–1995	Čukarički	17	(6)
1995–1997	Zemun	39	(13)
1997–1998	Partizan	25	(13)
1998–2001	Valladolid	13	(0)
2001–2002	Burgos	38	(4)
2003	Marco	10	(2)
2004	AEK Larnaca	20	(7)
2005	Litex Lovech	14	(2)
2005	Ethnikos Achna	12	(2)
2006–2007	Alcoyano	20	(2)
2007	Digenis Morphou		
2008	Alki Larnaca	8	(0)
2008–2009	Ermis Aradippou		
Total		248	(64)

International career
1996–1997	FR Yugoslavia U21	5	(4)
- * Club domestic league appearances and goals

Dragan Isailović (Serbian Cyrillic: Драган Исаиловић; born 12 January 1976) is a Serbian former professional footballer who played as a striker. He is best remembered for his performances in his one season with Partizan, securing him a transfer to La Liga side Valladolid in 1998. However, Isailović failed to make an impact in Spain, before going on to play for numerous clubs in Portugal, Cyprus, and Bulgaria.

== Club career ==
After spending two seasons at Zemun, Isailović moved to Partizan in the summer of 1997. He soon became a fan favorite after scoring the winning goal in a 1–0 home win over Croatia Zagreb in the first leg of the UEFA Champions League first qualifying round. However, they were eliminated after a 5–0 loss in the return leg. Isailović finished the 1997–98 season as the team's top scorer across all competitions, helping them win the national cup.

Between 1998 and 2001, Isailović was under contract with Spanish club Valladolid, but made just 13 appearances in La Liga over the course of three seasons. He subsequently moved to Segunda División side Burgos, helping them avoid relegation in his debut season. However, the club was expelled from the league due to administrative problems.

== International career ==
Isailović represented FR Yugoslavia at under-21 level, scoring four goals in five appearances during the team's unsuccessful qualification campaign for the 1998 UEFA Under-21 Championship.

== Personal life ==
His son, Aleksandar, is also a footballer.

== Career statistics ==
Club	Season	League	
Club	Season	Apps	Goals
Partizan	1997–98	25	13
Valladolid	1998–99	6	0
Valladolid	1999–2000	7	0
Valladolid	2000–01	0	0
Valladolid	Total	13	0
Burgos	2001–02	32	4
Burgos	2002–03	6	0
Burgos	Total	38	4
Marco	2002–03	10	2
AEK Larnaca	2003–04	8	4
AEK Larnaca	2004–05	12	3
AEK Larnaca	Total	20	7
Ethnikos Achna	2005–06	12	2
Alcoyano	2006–07	20	2
Alki Larnaca	2007–08	8	0
Career total		146	30

== Honours ==
Partizan

- FR Yugoslavia Cup: 1997–98

AEK Larnaca

- Cypriot Cup: 2003–04
