= Dragan Šarac =

Serbian football manager and player

Personal information
- Full name: Dragan Šarac
- Date of birth: 27 September 1975 (age 51)
- Place of birth: Ruma, SR Serbia, SFR Yugoslavia
- Height: 1.85 m (6 ft 1 in)
- Position: Left-back

Senior career*
Years	Team	Apps	(Gls)
1992–1995	Sloven Ruma	53	(5)
1995–2000	Obilić	137	(17)
1999	→ CSKA Sofia (loan)	0	(0)
2000–2002	Austria Wien	59	(2)
2002–2003	Pasching	33	(4)
2003–2005	Red Star Belgrade	37	(1)
2005–2007	Sturm Graz	61	(6)
2007	Vojvodina	11	(0)
2008	Horgoš	14	(2)
2008	Laktaši	14	(1)
2009–2011	Spartak Subotica	70	(1)
2011–2012	Novi Pazar	23	(0)
2012–2013	Voždovac	30	(0)
Total		542	(39)

International career
1996–1997	FR Yugoslavia U21	2	(0)
1998–2004	FR Yugoslavia / Serbia and Montenegro	6	(0)

Managerial career
- 2013–2014: Voždovac (assistant)
- 2014: Napredak Kruševac (assistant)
- 2014–2015: Red Star Belgrade (assistant)
- 2015: Borac Čačak (assistant)
- 2015–2016: Vojvodina (assistant)
- 2016–2018: Čukarički (assistant)
- 2018–2019: Radnički Niš (assistant)
- 2019–2021: Vojvodina (assistant)
- 2021: Radnički Niš (assistant)
- 2021: Al Batin (assistant)
- 2022: Radnički 1923 (assistant)
- 2022: Borac Banja Luka (assistant)
- 2022–2023: Radnički Niš (assistant)
- 2023: Radnički Niš
- * Club domestic league appearances and goals

Dragan Šarac (Serbian Cyrillic: Драган Шарац; born 27 September 1975) is a Serbian football manager and former player.

== Club career ==
After playing for his hometown club Sloven Ruma, Šarac joined ambitious Obilić in the summer of 1995. He was a regular member of the team that became champions of FR Yugoslavia for the 1997–98 season. In the summer of 1999, Šarac moved abroad to Bulgarian side CSKA Sofia, alongside several teammates. He stayed for only a couple of months and made three appearances in the 1999–2000 UEFA Cup, before returning to Obilić.

In July 2000, Šarac moved abroad for the second time and signed with Austria Wien. He spent two seasons at the club and then left for fellow Bundesliga side Pasching. In July 2003, Šarac returned to his homeland and joined Red Star Belgrade on a two-year contract. He played regularly in his debut season and helped the team win the double. In May 2005, Šarac moved back to Austria and signed with Sturm Graz for two years.

In July 2007, Šarac returned to Serbia and signed with Vojvodina. He was released the following January, alongside Saša Drakulić, after playing futsal without permission during the winter break.

== International career ==
Between 1998 and 2004, Šarac was capped six times for Serbia and Montenegro (formerly known as FR Yugoslavia) at full level. He previously played for the national under-21 team. His final international was a July 2004 Kirin Cup match against Japan.

== Managerial career ==
After hanging up his boots, Šarac served as assistant manager to Nenad Lalatović at numerous clubs, including Voždovac, Napredak Kruševac, Red Star Belgrade, Borac Čačak, Vojvodina (two spells), Čukarički, Radnički Niš (three spells), Al Batin, Radnički 1923, and Borac Banja Luka.

In March 2023, Šarac was appointed as Nenad Lalatović's replacement as manager of Radnički Niš.

== Career statistics ==
Club	Season	League	
Club	Season	Apps	Goals
Obilić	1995–96	31	3
Obilić	1996–97	29	3
Obilić	1997–98	29	3
Obilić	1998–99	22	7
Obilić	1999–2000	26	1
Obilić	Total	137	17

== Honours ==
Obilić

- First League of FR Yugoslavia: 1997–98

Red Star Belgrade

- First League of Serbia and Montenegro: 2003–04
- Serbia and Montenegro Cup: 2003–04
