= Milan Lešnjak =

Serbian footballer and manager

Personal information
- Date of birth: 9 September 1975 (age 51)
- Place of birth: Belgrade, SFR Yugoslavia
- Height: 1.85 m (6 ft 1 in)
- Position: Defender

Youth career
- Red Star Belgrade

Senior career*
Years	Team	Apps	(Gls)
1993–1994	Red Star Belgrade	5	(0)
1994–1998	Obilić	89	(3)
1998–2002	Club Brugge	59	(2)
2003–2005	Saturn Ramenskoye	27	(0)
Total		180	(5)

International career
1996–1997	FR Yugoslavia U21	7	(0)

Managerial career
- 2012–2013: Serbia U17
- 2013: Napredak Kruševac
- 2014: Sinđelić Beograd
- 2016: Čukarički
- 2017: Rudar Pljevlja
- 2017–2018: Red Star Belgrade (U19)
- 2019–2020: Serbia U19
- 2022: Čukarički
- 2022: Čukarički (assistant)
- 2023: Čukarički
- 2025–2026: Čukarički
- * Club domestic league appearances and goals

Milan Lešnjak (Serbian Cyrillic: Милан Лешњак; born 9 September 1975) is a Serbian football manager and former player. He last managed club Čukarički.

== Career ==
During his playing career, Lešnjak represented Red Star Belgrade, Obilić, Club Brugge and Saturn Ramenskoye. He was also capped for FR Yugoslavia at under-21 level.

In 2013, Lešnjak served as manager of Napredak Kruševac. He was appointed manager of Čukarički in March 2016.

== Honours ==
Obilić

- First League of FR Yugoslavia: 1997–98

Club Brugge

- Belgian Cup: 2001–02
- Belgian Super Cup: 1998

== Political activities ==
In November 2021, Lešnjak was appointed vice president of the Alliance 90/Greens of Serbia political party in charge of sports issues. In August 2023, Lešnjak stated his support for Rade Basta and his European Way Movement.
