= Nenad Grozdić =

Serbian football manager and player

Personal information
- Full name: Nenad Grozdić
- Date of birth: 3 February 1974 (age 52)
- Place of birth: Kučevo, SR Serbia, SFR Yugoslavia
- Height: 1.68 m (5 ft 6 in)
- Position: Midfielder

Youth career
- Zvižd
- Majdanpek

Senior career*
Years	Team	Apps	(Gls)
1992–1993	Majdanpek		
1993–1994	Zvižd		
1994–1995	Rudar Kostolac		
1996–1999	Obilić	96	(15)
1999–2000	Vitesse	29	(1)
2000–2002	Lens	10	(0)
2001–2002	→ Racing Ferrol (loan)	22	(2)
2002–2003	Rad	29	(0)
2004	Bursaspor	18	(1)
2006	Parndorf	24	(5)
2007–2008	Schwadorf	23	(0)
2008–2009	Pasching	41	(4)
2010	Schwadorf	13	(3)
2010	Lackenbach	7	(0)
Total		312	(31)

International career
1998–2000	FR Yugoslavia	11	(0)

Managerial career
- 2010: Lackenbach (player-manager)
- 2013: Timok
- 2015: Timočanin
- 2017: Sloga 33
- 2020: Jošanica
- 2021: Jedinstvo Stara Pazova
- 2022: OFK Beograd
- * Club domestic league appearances and goals

Nenad Grozdić (Serbian Cyrillic: Ненад Гроздић; born 3 February 1974) is a Serbian football manager and former player.

After making a name for himself in his homeland at Obilić, Grozdić went on to play abroad for Vitesse and Lens, among others. He also represented FR Yugoslavia internationally, earning 11 caps between 1998 and 2000.

== Club career ==
After playing in the lower leagues of FR Yugoslavia, Grozdić joined First League club Obilić in the 1996 winter transfer window, spending the next three-and-a-half years with the Vitezovi. He was an integral part of the team that won the national championship in the 1997–98 season. In the summer of 1999, Grozdić moved abroad and signed with Dutch club Vitesse. He made 29 Eredivisie appearances in his sole season at the GelreDome, scoring once. In August 2000, Grozdić was transferred to French side Lens for a reported fee of 7.5 million guilder. He finished his career playing in the lower leagues of Austria.

== International career ==
At international level, Grozdić was capped 11 times for FR Yugoslavia, making his national team debut in a 3–1 friendly loss away to Argentina on 25 February 1998. He was named in the preliminary 24-man squad for UEFA Euro 2000 by manager Vujadin Boškov, failing to make the final cut. His last cap came in a 2–1 away friendly win over Northern Ireland on 16 August 2000.

== Managerial career ==
In July 2022, Grozdić was appointed as manager of OFK Beograd. He left the Serbian League Belgrade club by mutual consent in December of that year.

== Career statistics ==
Club	Season	League	
Club	Season	Apps	Goals
Obilić	1995–96	16	0
Obilić	1996–97	28	4
Obilić	1997–98	29	4
Obilić	1998–99	23	7
Obilić	Total	96	15

== Honours ==
Obilić

- First League of FR Yugoslavia: 1997–98
