= Miroslav Savić =

Serbian footballer

Personal information
- Full name: Miroslav Savić
- Date of birth: 20 April 1973 (age 53)
- Place of birth: Prijedor, SFR Yugoslavia
- Height: 1.80 m (5 ft 11 in)
- Position: Defender

Senior career*
Years	Team	Apps	(Gls)
1992–1995	Borac Banja Luka	24	(1)
1994–1996	Radnički Beograd	40	(4)
1996–1999	Obilić	69	(4)
1999	Zemun	10	(0)
2000	Aris Thessaloniki	11	(0)
2000–2001	Levski Sofia	9	(0)
2002–2003	Obilić	31	(0)
2004	Hajduk Beograd	17	(0)
2004–2006	Khazar Lankaran	45	(0)
2007	Masallı	3	(0)
Total		259	(9)

International career
1998	FR Yugoslavia	2	(0)
- * Club domestic league appearances and goals

Miroslav Savić (Serbian Cyrillic: Мирослав Савић; born 20 April 1973) is a Serbian retired footballer who played as a defender.

== Club career ==
After playing for Radnički Beograd, Savić moved to Obilić in 1996. He was a regular member of the team that won the 1997–98 First League of FR Yugoslavia. In January 2000, Savić was transferred to Greek side Aris Thessaloniki. He then spent one season at Bulgarian club Levski Sofia and won the league title.

== International career ==
In 1998, Savić made two appearances for FR Yugoslavia in friendly matches against Argentina and Israel.

== Honours ==
Obilić

- First League of FR Yugoslavia: 1997–98
- FR Yugoslavia Cup: Runner-up 1997–98

Levski Sofia

- Bulgarian First League: 2000–01
