= Sahmir Garčević =

Bosnian footballer

Personal information
- Full name: Sahmir Garčević
- Date of birth: 18 January 1973 (age 53)
- Place of birth: Nikšić, SFR Yugoslavia
- Position: Striker

Senior career*
Years	Team	Apps	(Gls)
1991–1994	Sutjeska	42	(1)
1994–1997	Budućnost	50	(5)
1997–1998	Obilić	16	(1)
1998–1999	Beograd		
1999–2002	Željezničar	49	(9)
2002–2003	Žepče	14	(1)
2004–2005	Bashkimi	10	(1)
2005–2006	Olimpik Sarajevo		
- * Club domestic league appearances and goals

Sahmir Garčević (born 18 January 1973) is a Bosnian retired football forward.

== Club career ==
He played as forward or attacking midfielder. His playing career include clubs such as FK Budućnost Podgorica, FK Obilić, FK Beograd, FK Željezničar Sarajevo, NK Žepče, KF Bashkimi and FK Olimpik Sarajevo. He played with FK Sutjeska Nikšić in the 1991–92 Yugoslav First League making 3 appearances as substitute.

== Honours ==
Obilić

- First League of FR Yugoslavia: 1997–98

Željezničar Sarajevo

- Premier League of Bosnia and Herzegovina: 2001–02
