= Nikola Damjanac =

Serbian former professional footballer

Personal information
- Full name: Nikola Damjanac
- Date of birth: 21 October 1971 (age 55)
- Place of birth: Mostar, SFR Yugoslavia
- Height: 1.90 m (6 ft 3 in)
- Position: Goalkeeper

Youth career
- Velež Mostar

Senior career*
Years	Team	Apps	(Gls)
1991–1997	Partizan	40	(0)
1993–1994	→ OFK Beograd (loan)	30	(0)
1997–1998	Roda JC	10	(0)
1998–2000	Partizan	36	(0)
2000–2001	Antalyaspor	6	(0)
2001	Fluminense	2	(0)
2002	OFK Beograd	7	(0)
2002	Saturn Ramenskoye	2	(0)
2004–2005	OFK Beograd	18	(0)
Total		151	(0)

International career
1991	Yugoslavia U21	1	(0)
- * Club domestic league appearances and goals

Nikola Damjanac (Serbian Cyrillic: Никола Дамјанац; born 21 October 1971) is a Serbian former professional footballer who played as a goalkeeper.

== Playing career ==
=== Club career ===
After starting out at his hometown club Velež Mostar, Damjanac joined Partizan. He was loaned to OFK Beograd in the 1993–94 season, before returning to Stadion JNA. In the summer of 1997, Damjanac moved to the Netherlands and signed with Roda JC. He subsequently returned to Partizan in 1998. In the summer of 2000, Damjanac again moved abroad and joined Turkish side Antalyaspor. He left Turkey after one season and moved to Brazilian club Fluminense, alongside Miodrag Anđelković. Consequently, Damjanac briefly returned to OFK Beograd, before moving to Russian club Saturn Ramenskoye in the summer of 2002. He again returned to OFK Beograd in the 2004–05 season.

=== International career ===
In 1991, Damjanac made one appearance for the Yugoslavia U21s during the 1992 UEFA Under-21 Championship.

== Post-playing career ==
After retiring as a player in 2005, Damjanac became a sports agent, being a co-owner of Lian Sports, alongside Fali Ramadani.

== Personal life ==
His son is footballer Aleksa Damjanac.

== Honours ==
Partizan

- First League of FR Yugoslavia: 1992–93, 1995–96, 1996–97, 1998–99
