= Dragan Mićić =

Bosnian-Serbian footballer and manager

Personal information
- Full name: Dragan Mićić
- Date of birth: 20 June 1969 (age 57)
- Place of birth: Bijeljina, SFR Yugoslavia
- Height: 1.73 m (5 ft 8 in)
- Position: Forward

Senior career*
Years	Team	Apps	(Gls)
1987–1992	Podrinje Janja		
1993–1996	Loznica	77	(25)
1996–2000	Red Star Belgrade	74	(24)
2000–2001	Rad	24	(7)
2002	Koper	11	(2)
2002–2006	Budućnost Banatski Dvor	80	(20)
2006–2007	Banat Zrenjanin	20	(2)
2008	Radnički Obrenovac	12	(4)

Managerial career
- 2011–2015: Drina Zvornik
- 2017–2018: Zvijezda 09
- 2018–2019: Sloga Gornje Crnjelovo
- 2019–2021: Loznica
- 2022: Loznica
- * Club domestic league appearances and goals

Dragan Mićić (Serbian Cyrillic: Драган Мићић, born 20 June 1969) is a Bosnian-Serbian professional football manager and former player.

== Playing career ==
Born in Bijeljina, SR Bosnia and Herzegovina, he started his career in FK Podrinje Janja. In 1993, he moved to Serbian club FK Loznica playing in the First League of FR Yugoslavia. After three seasons showing excellent attacking skills, he signed with the 1991 European and World Champions, Red Star Belgrade, where he stayed until 2000. Next he moved to another First League club, FK Rad. In the winter break of the 2001–02 season, he moved to Slovenia and played, until the end of that season, in Slovenian Prva Liga club FC Koper. Next, he was back to Serbia, this time signing with FK Budućnost Banatski Dvor. In 2006, he became a member of FK Banat Zrenjanin, playing one and a half seasons with them in Serbian Superliga. He last played for FK Radnički Obrenovac in 2008.

== Managerial career ==
On 25 March 2011, Mićić was appointed manager of Drina Zvornik. In the 2013–14 season he won the First League of RS with his team and promoted Drina back to the Bosnian Premier League. He left the club in March 2015. He then worked for some time with the Serbian national youth teams.

On 28 December 2017, he was appointed as manager of Zvijezda 09, which he was until 26 February 2018. Then in the summer of 2018, Mićić became the manager of Sloga Gornje Crnjelovo, who he promoted to the First League of RS in the 2017–18 season. On 9 April 2019, he became the manager of Loznica.

== Honours ==
=== Player ===
Red Star Belgrade

- First League of FR Yugoslavia: 1999–2000
- FR Yugoslavia Cup: 1996–97, 1997–98, 1999–2000

=== Manager ===
Drina Zvornik

- First League of the Republika Srpska: 2013–14

Sloga Gornje Crnjelovo

- Second League of the Republika Srpska: 2017–18 (East)
