= Saša Viciknez =

Serbian footballer (born 1974)

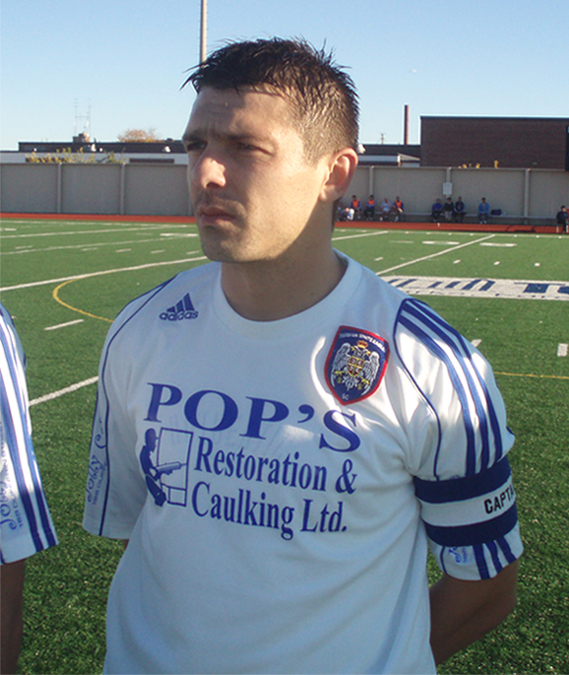
- Viciknez in 2006

Personal information
- Full name: Aleksandar Viciknez
- Date of birth: 30 May 1974 (age 52)
- Place of birth: Vršac, SFR Yugoslavia
- Height: 5 ft 9 in (1.75 m)
- Positions: Left wing; forward

Senior career*
| Years | Team | Apps | (Gls) |
| 1995–1997 | Dinamo Pančevo | | |
| 1997–2001 | Obilić | 46 | (12) |
| 2000 | → Shanghai Shenhua (loan) | 3 | (1) |
| 2001–2002 | Hajduk Kula | 11 | (1) |
| 2002–2004 | Naftex Burgas | 24 | (5) |
| 2004–2005 | Crvena Zvezda Pavliš | | |
| 2005–2006 | ČSK Pivara | | |
| 2006–2013 | Serbian White Eagles | 116 | (64) |
| Total | | 200 | (83) |
- * Club domestic league appearances and goals

Aleksandar “Saša” Viciknez (Serbian Cyrillic: Александар Саша Вицикнез, pronounced [aleksǎːndar sâʃa ʋǐtsiknez]; born 30 May 1974) is a retired Serbian footballer who played mostly as a left winger.

Viciknez debuted in the Second League of FR Yugoslavia in 1995 with FK Dinamo Pančevo, and ultimately reached the highest tier in 1997 with FK Obilić. During his tenure in Belgrade he won the 1997-98 Yugoslav Championship, and featured in the 1998–99 UEFA Champions League. Following an early successful domestic career and a brief stint with FK Hajduk Kula he ventured abroad to play in the Chinese Jia-A League, and Bulgarian A PFG. He returned home in 2004 to spend time with Crvena Zvezda Pavliš, and FK ČSK Čelarevo.

In 2006, he went abroad for the third time to play in the Canadian Soccer League with the Serbian White Eagles FC. The acquisition of Viciknez played a prominent role in the procession of European professional players to the CSL, which ushered in an era of a large volume of import players to the league. Throughout his time in Toronto he served numerous times as the club's team captain, and won several accolades such as the CSL Championship, International Division title, and the CSL MVP award.

== Career ==
Viciknez began his career in 1995 with FK Dinamo Pančevo in the Second League of FR Yugoslavia. In 1997, he signed with FK Obilić of the First League of FR Yugoslavia. In his debut season he was part of the famed Obilić squad that won the 1997–98 Yugoslav Championship. As a result, participated in the 1998–99 UEFA Champions League, where he played against FC Bayern Munich. In 2000, he went abroad to China to play with Shanghai Shenhua in the Chinese Jia-A League. While playing in China, he was sometimes mistakenly referred to as Sasa Racha (his name was confused with his teammate Saša Raca).

His stay in China was short-lived and he returned to Europe to briefly play with FK Hajduk Kula, before heading abroad once more to Bulgaria. During his time in Bulgaria he played with PFC Naftex Burgas in the Bulgarian A PFG. After two seasons abroad he returned to Serbia to play in the Serbian League Vojvodina, and the Serbian First League with Crvena Zvezda Pavliš, and FK ČSK Čelarevo.

In 2006, he went overseas to play with the Serbian White Eagles in the Canadian Soccer League. He made his debut on 19 May 2006 against Italia Shooters, where he also recorded a goal in a 3–2 victory. In his debut season he was named to the CSL All-Star roster against Clyde F.C., where he scored the lone goal in a 2–1 defeat. He finished as the club's second highest goal scorer, and clinched the International Division title. In the postseason he scored both goals in a 3–0 victory over Toronto Supra Portuguese to advance Serbia to the semi-finals. He featured in the CSL Championship final against Italia Shooters where Italia managed to upset Serbia with a 1–0 defeat. At the conclusion of the season he received the MVP award.

During the 2007 season he contributed to Serbia's second International Division title, and reached the championship final for the second straight season. He also was named to the all-star squad for the second year in a row. Viciknez added the championship to his resume in the 2008 season, where in the finals Serbia faced Trois-Rivières Attak and won the title after a 2–1 victory in a penalty shootout. The following season, Serbia added their third International Division title to their trophy cabinet. During the preliminary round of the postseason he contributed significantly by recording several goals in their two-leg quarter-final series against TFC Academy. He featured in his fourth championship appearance in a rematch against Trois-Rivières, where the Attak denied Serbia their championship after a 3–2 defeat in a penalty shootout at BMO Field. The league recognized his efforts by awarding him with his second CSL MVP award.

== Honours ==
Obilić

- First League of FR Yugoslavia: 1997–98

Serbian White Eagles

- CSL Championship: 2008
- Canadian Soccer League International Division: 2006, 2007, 2009
