= FK Budućnost Valjevo =

Serbian football club (1920–2014)

Budućnost Valjevo
- Full name: Fudbalski Klub Budućnost
- Nickname: Stara dama (The Old Lady)
- Founded: 1920; 106 years ago
- Dissolved: 2014 (became FK Budućnost Krušik 2014)
- Ground: Stadion Park Pećina, Valjevo
- Capacity: 4,000
- 2013–14: Drina Zone League, 4th of 16
Home colours	Away colours

FK Budućnost Valjevo (Serbian Cyrillic: ФК Будућност Ваљево) is a defunct football club based in Valjevo, Serbia.

== History ==
The original club was founded as SK Sloga in 1920. They were, however, banned by the authorities after just a year. In 1925, the club continued its activities as RSK Valjevo and was led by some founding members of the previous club. Their first recorded game occurred in 1926. In 1929, the club changed its name to FK Budućnost. They became members of the Belgrade Football Subassociation in 1930.

In 1959, the club merged with FK Radnički to form FK Metalac. They earned promotion to the Yugoslav Second League in 1969. In 1971, the club changed its name back to FK Budućnost. They spent two more seasons in the second tier of Yugoslav football.

After the breakup of Yugoslavia, the club won the Serbian League West in 1993–94 and subsequently the Second League of FR Yugoslavia in 1995–96 to reach the First League of FR Yugoslavia. They competed in the I/B League for two seasons (1996–97 and 1997–98).

In July 2014, after three unsuccessful seasons in the Drina Zone League, the club was controversially merged with local rivals FK Krušik to create FK Budućnost Krušik 2014.

== Honours ==
Second League of FR Yugoslavia (Tier 2)

- 1995–96

Serbian League West / Serbian League Danube (Tier 3)

- 1993–94 / 2001–02

== Notable players ==
This is a list of players who have played at full international level.

- (Serbia and Montenegro) Milivoje Ćirković
- (Serbia and Montenegro) Nikola Lazetić
- (Socialist Federal Republic of Yugoslavia) Slobodan Santrač

For a list of all FK Budućnost Valjevo players with a Wikipedia article, see Category:FK Budućnost Valjevo players.

== Managerial history ==
Period	Name
1996–1997	(Federal Republic of Yugoslavia) Jovica Škoro
	(Federal Republic of Yugoslavia) Zoran Lučić
2007	(Serbia) Goran Nikić
	(Serbia and Montenegro) Dragan Rebić
2013	(Serbia) Vladica Petrović
2013–2014	(Serbia) Saša Đoković
