= Zoran Radosavljević (footballer) =

Serbian footballer (born 1968)

Personal information
- Date of birth: 4 July 1968 (age 58)
- Place of birth: Kragujevac, SFR Yugoslavia
- Height: 1.83 m (6 ft 0 in)
- Position: Midfielder

Senior career*
Years	Team	Apps	(Gls)
1987–1994	Radnički Kragujevac		
1987–1988	→ Azbest Stragari (loan)		
1994–1996	Badnjevac		
1996–1997	Red Star Belgrade	18	(0)
1997	Radnički Kragujevac		
1998	Panargiakos		
1998–2001	Radnički Kragujevac	69+	(11)
2002–2007	Javor Ivanjica	56+	(3+)
2007–2008	Radnički Kragujevac		
- * Club domestic league appearances and goals

Zoran Radosavljević (Serbian Cyrillic: Зоран Радосављевић; born 4 July 1968) is a Serbian former professional footballer who played as a midfielder.

== Career ==
Born in Sušica, Kragujevac, Radosavljević began playing football with local side FK Radnički Kragujevac. He would later play in the Yugoslav First League for Red Star Belgrade and the Serbian SuperLiga with Javor Ivanjica, but spent most of his career with Radnički. He won the 1997 Yugoslav Cup with Red Star.

Radosavljević moved to Greece in December 1997, joining Greek second division side Panargiakos for the second half of the 1997–98 season. He made his league debut against Trikala in January 1998, but after just six months with the club, he returned to Serbia and Radnički Kragujevac. Next, he joined Javor Ivanjica for five seasons and finished his career after one more season with Radnički Kragujevac. He retired in 2008.
