= FK Obilić Stadium =

Multi-purpose stadium in Belgrade, Serbia

Coordinates: 44°47′29.71″N 20°29′40.72″E

Obilić Stadium
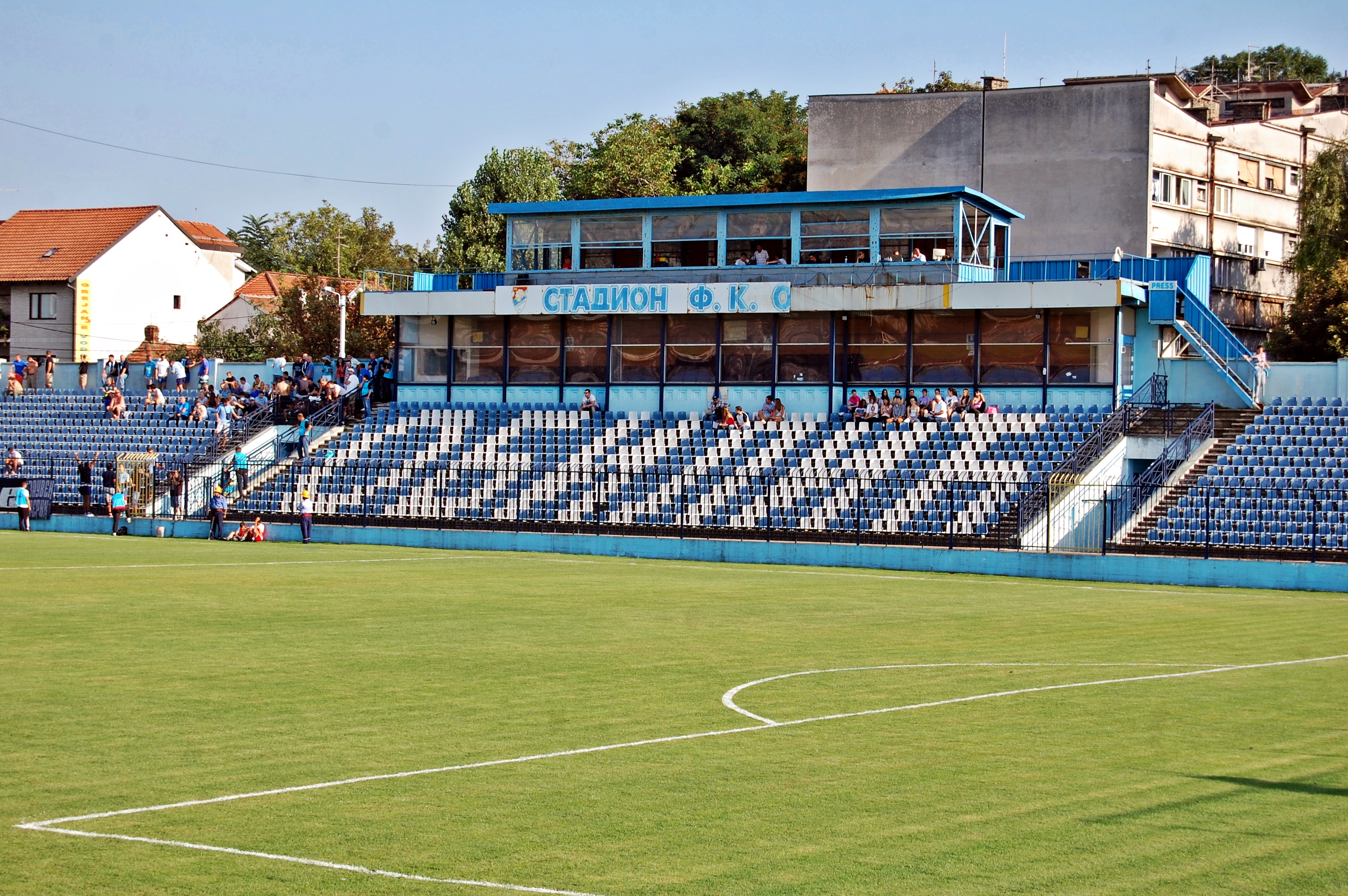
- Obilić Stadium in August 2014

- Location within Belgrade
- Location: Belgrade, Serbia
- Capacity: 4,508
- Surface: Grass
- Field size: 105 by 68 metres (344 ft × 223 ft)

Obilić Stadium (Serbian: Стадион ФК Обилић / Stadion FK Obilić) is a football stadium in Belgrade, Serbia, located in Vračar municipality. The stadium has a seating capacity for 4,508 people. The venue was the home ground of FK Obilić until 2015 and was used during the 2011 UEFA European Under-17 Championship.

== History ==
The stadium was built at the beginning of 1950s. From its earliest years, it served as home venue for FK Obilić. Initially, it was just a football pitch, but was developed over the years. In 1976, the ground received a grass surface. For many years, FK Obilić played in lower, regional divisions. In 1988, the club was promoted to Yugoslav Third League. From 1992–93 season, it played in Second League of FR Yugoslavia. In 1994, the club was promoted to "B Group" of First League of FR Yugoslavia.

In 1995, FK Obilić achieved greater success by reaching Yugoslav Cup final. The first leg of the final was played on 10 May 1995 at Obilić Stadium, where the hosts lost 0–4 to FK Crvena zvezda. After a 0–0 draw at Marakana, the title went to the opponent, but it gave FK Obilić right to play in UEFA Cup Winners' Cup in next season. On 10 August 1995, the first-ever European competition game took place at Obilić Stadium. The hosts lost 0–1 to Georgian side FC Dinamo Batumi in the qualifying round. After 2–2 draw in Batumi two weeks later, they were eliminated.

For the 1996–97 season, the club was bought by Arkan. The club was promoted to "A Group" of First League of FR Yugoslavia. In the next season, FK Obilić achieved its greatest official success and was declared Champion of Yugoslavia. Many reports indicated that the good result was achieved by Arkan's threats against referees and opposing players. In that season club for the second time reached National Cup final. On 6 May 1998 the first leg against FK Partizan was played at Obilić Stadium. Game ended with a 0–0 draw. In second leg played week later at Partizan Stadium Obilić lost 0–2.

Thanks to the success, FK Obilić took part in the following season's UEFA Champions League qualification; it was eliminated from the UEFA Cup, but played matches against notable opponents, FC Bayern Munich and Atlético Madrid, at Partizan Stadium instead of Obilić Stadium. Before the season UEFA threatened to exclude FK Obilić from the competition as its owner was indicted for crimes against humanity, so Arkan transferred the ownership to his wife, turbofolk performer Ceca. In 1998–99 season FK Obilić finished in second place in the domestic competition.

Under Arkan's control, unlicensed construction began to improve the stadium's infrastructure. New stands were erected on the north and south side of the pitch. The north stand was equipped with a unique, panoramic glass lounge. Plans were developed to completely rebuild the entire stadium, giving it a capacity of 16,200 spectators and becoming one of the most modern football venues in Serbia. However, on 15 January 2000, Arkan was murdered by another criminal and the works were discontinued.

As the new stands were built without permits, a dispute arose as to whether they should be demolished. Also, the stadium stands at a place where Nazi German soldiers were executed during World War II. It is rumored that the remains of at least 700 members of the Prinz Eugen Division lie under the south stand.

After Arkan's death, the team dropped inexorably lower. FK Obilić continued to play in top division until 2006, when it was relegated, and then dropped lower and lower each year until, in 2015, the club's senior team was dismantled. Until 2016, the stadium was often rented by local clubs (FK Voždovac, FK Partizan, FK Rad, FK Bežanija, FK Čukarički, OFK Beograd) for games. After this, the stadium fell into disrepair. In 2021, the facility was restored for young footballers.

On 31 October 2013, a Women's World Cup qualification game was played at the stadium (Serbia – Iceland 1–2). The stadium has also hosted multiple international games of youth national football teams and was one of the venues of men's and women's football tournament at 2009 Summer Universiade as well as 2011 UEFA European Under-17 Championship (three group stage matches were played at Obilić Stadium during that tournament).
