= 1997–98 First League of FR Yugoslavia =

First League of FR Yugoslavia
- Season: 1997–98
- Champions: Obilić; 1st domestic title
- Champions League: Obilić
- UEFA Cup: Red Star
- Cup Winners' Cup: Partizan
- Intertoto Cup: Vojvodina
- Goals: 560
- Top goalscorer: Saša Marković (27)

The 1997–98 First League of FR Yugoslavia was the sixth season of the FR Yugoslavia's top-level football league since its establishment.

== Overview ==
The league was divided into 2 groups, A and B, consisting each of 10 clubs. Both groups were played in league system. By winter break all clubs in each group meet each other twice, home and away, with the bottom four classified from A group moving to the group B, and being replaced by the top four from the B group. At the end of the season because the two groups league format was being abandoned for the next season and replaced by a single league consisting of 16 clubs, more clubs were relegated, six, and only the two first classified from the Second League of FR Yugoslavia would be promoted.

At the end of the season FK Obilić became champions for the first time in their history.

The league's top-scorer with a total of 27 goals was Saša Marković who played the first half of the season with FK Železnik and moved during the winter break to Red Star Belgrade where he played the rest of the season.

Six clubs were relegated at the end of the season: FK Budućnost Valjevo, FK Rudar Pljevlja, FK Sutjeska Nikšić, FK Loznica, FK Borac Čačak and FK Bečej.

== Teams ==
Location of teams in the 1997–98 First League
Red: 1A League; Blue: 1B League.

=== 1A League ===
Club	City	Stadium	Capacity
Partizan	Belgrade	Partizan Stadium	32,710
Red Star	Belgrade	Red Star Stadium	55,538
Vojvodina	Novi Sad	Karađorđe Stadium	17,204
Zemun	Zemun, Belgrade	Zemun Stadium	10,000
Rad	Belgrade	Stadion Kralj Petar I	6,000
Proleter	Zrenjanin	Stadion Karađorđev park	13,500
Hajduk Kula	Kula	Stadion Hajduk	6,000
Budućnost Podgorica	Podgorica	Podgorica City Stadium	12,000
Obilić	Belgrade	FK Obilić Stadium	4,500
Železnik	Belgrade	Železnik Stadium	8,000
Mladost Lučani	Lučani	Mladost Stadium	8,000
Čukarički	Belgrade	Stadion Čukarički	7,000

=== 1B League ===
Club	City	Stadium	Capacity
Priština	Priština	Priština City Stadium	25,000
Radnički	Kragujevac	Čika Dača Stadium	15,000
Loznica	Loznica	Stadion Lagator	4,000
Borac	Čačak	Čačak Stadium	6,000
Sutjeska	Nikšić	Gradski stadion (Nikšić)	10,800
OFK Beograd	Karaburma, Belgrade	Omladinski Stadium	20,000
Spartak	Subotica	Subotica City Stadium	13,000
Radnički Niš	Niš	Čair Stadium	18,000
Bečej	Bečej	Stadion kraj Tise	3,000
Budućnost Valjevo	Valjevo	Park Pećina	6,000
Sartid	Smederevo	Smederevo City Stadium	17,200
Rudar Pljevlja	Pljevlja	Stadion pod Golubinjom	10,000

== IA league ==
=== Table ===
Pos	Team	Pld	W	D	L	GF	GA	GD	Pts	Qualification or relegation
1	Obilić (C)	33	27	5	1	72	19	+53	86	Qualification for Champions League first qualifying round
2	Red Star	33	27	3	3	86	22	+64	84	Qualification for UEFA Cup first qualifying round
3	Partizan	33	22	4	7	73	38	+35	70	Qualification for Cup Winners' Cup qualifying round
4	Vojvodina	33	14	7	12	57	63	−6	49	Qualification for Intertoto Cup first round
5	Rad	33	12	6	15	35	39	−4	42	
6	Zemun	33	10	9	14	38	50	−12	39	
7	Hajduk Kula	33	10	5	18	32	51	−19	35	
8	Budućnost Podgorica	33	8	9	16	27	53	−26	33	
9	Proleter Zrenjanin	33	10	2	21	40	64	−24	32	
10	Železnik	33	9	5	19	43	62	−19	32	
11	Čukarički (R)	33	9	4	20	32	45	−13	31	Qualification for relegation play-off
12	Mladost Lučani (R)	33	9	3	21	25	54	−29	30	Relegation to Second League of FR Yugoslavia

(C) Champions; (R) Relegated

=== Results ===
==== First and second round ====
Home \ Away	BPO	ČUK	HAJ	MLA	OBI	PAR	PRO	RAD	RSB	VOJ	ZEM	ŽEL
Budućnost Podgorica		0–1	0–0	3–0	0–0	1–1	3–1	0–1	1–1	2–3	1–1	4–2
Čukarički	2–0		4–1	2–0	0–1	1–2	3–1	1–2	1–3	2–1	1–1	1–1
Hajduk Kula	2–0	1–0		3–1	0–4	0–1	2–1	0–0	0–0	2–2	4–1	1–0
Mladost Lučani	1–0	0–0	2–1		1–5	0–2	2–1	3–1	0–1	0–0	0–0	3–2
Obilić	2–0	1–0	6–0	4–0		1–2	1–0	1–0	4–2	1–0	2–1	3–1
Partizan	6–0	1–0	4–1	2–0	1–2		4–1	2–1	1–2	5–6	10–3	3–0
Proleter Zrenjanin	2–1	0–3	3–1	2–0	1–2	1–2		2–2	0–3	2–0	0–1	2–1
Rad	0–0	1–1	1–0	3–1	0–4	1–1	2–0		0–1	0–2	4–0	0–1
Red Star	2–0	2–0	4–1	4–0	0–1	2–0	5–0	1–0		5–0	4–1	2–1
Vojvodina	2–2	4–2	3–1	3–2	1–1	2–3	3–1	3–1	1–7		1–1	3–2
Zemun	5–1	1–0	1–0	1–0	0–0	1–2	2–1	0–0	0–1	1–2		3–1
Železnik	2–0	2–1	2–1	0–1	3–4	1–1	1–4	2–0	3–4	1–1	2–1	

Source: Soccerway
Legend: Blue = home team win; Yellow = draw; Red = away team win.

==== Third round ====
Home \ Away	BPO	ČUK	HAJ	MLA	OBI	PAR	PRO	RAD	RSB	VOJ	ZEM	ŽEL
Budućnost Podgorica		2–0	0–0	2–0			2–1					1–0
Čukarički			1–0		1–3	0–1					0–0	1–0
Hajduk Kula				1–0			3–1	2–1	0–1	2–0		
Mladost Lučani		3–0			0–2	2–0					0–1	2–1
Obilić	2–0		2–0					2–1	2–2	4–0		2–0
Partizan	4–0		1–1		0–1			1–0		2–1		4–0
Proleter Zrenjanin		2–1		1–0	1–1	0–1					1–0	
Rad	4–0	2–1		1–0			2–1		0–1	2–0		
Red Star	4–0	3–0		2–0		4–0	5–1				3–1	
Vojvodina	0–0	2–0		3–1			3–2		1–3		3–1	
Zemun	0–0		1–0		0–1	2–3		4–0				2–2
Železnik			2–1				2–3	1–1	2–1	2–1		

Source: Soccerway
Legend: Blue = home team win; Yellow = draw; Red = away team win.

== IB league ==
=== Table ===
Pos	Team	Pld	W	D	L	GF	GA	GD	Pts	Promotion or relegation
1	OFK Beograd (P)	33	19	8	6	61	34	+27	65	Promotion to First League of FR Yugoslavia
2	Sartid (P)	33	19	6	8	46	23	+23	63	Promotion to First League of FR Yugoslavia
3	Priština (P)	33	17	9	7	57	28	+29	60	Promotion to First League of FR Yugoslavia
4	Spartak Subotica (P)	33	17	5	11	56	40	+16	56	Promotion to First League of FR Yugoslavia
5	Radnički Niš (P)	33	14	12	7	49	35	+14	54	Promotion to First League of FR Yugoslavia
6	Radnički Kragujevac (P)	33	16	5	12	50	43	+7	53	Qualification for relegation play-off
7	Budućnost Valjevo (R)	33	13	6	14	43	52	−9	45	Relegation to Second League of FR Yugoslavia
8	Rudar Pljevlja (R)	33	13	4	16	44	54	−10	43	Relegation to Second League of FR Yugoslavia
9	Sutjeska (R)	33	8	8	17	34	43	−9	32	Relegation to Second League of FR Yugoslavia
10	Loznica (R)	33	7	7	19	24	46	−22	28	Relegation to Second League of FR Yugoslavia
11	Borac Čačak (R)	33	7	7	19	32	65	−33	28	Relegation to Second League of FR Yugoslavia
12	Bečej (R)	33	8	3	22	22	54	−32	27	Relegation to Second League of FR Yugoslavia

(P) Promoted; (R) Relegated

=== Results ===
==== First and second round ====
Home \ Away	BEČ	BOR	BVA	LOZ	OFK	PRI	RDK	RNI	RUD	SAR	SPA	SUT
Bečej		3–1	0–2	1–0	1–0	0–3	0–4	1–2	3–2	0–0	0–1	1–0
Borac Čačak	1–3		0–1	0–1	0–4	1–1	0–0	2–2	1–0	1–1	3–1	3–1
Budućnost Valjevo	2–0	3–1		3–1	0–2	2–0	3–0	1–1	4–1	1–0	0–3	1–1
Loznica	2–0	1–0	2–2		1–2	1–2	3–0	0–3	1–0	0–1	1–0	1–0
OFK Beograd	3–2	1–2	4–1	3–0		0–0	1–0	2–1	2–1	2–1	3–3	2–0
Priština	5–0	5–1	4–0	1–1	2–0		3–1	0–0	2–1	2–0	3–1	1–0
Radnički Kragujevac	1–0	3–1	1–0	3–1	2–4	1–3		2–1	1–0	1–0	3–1	3–1
Radnički Niš	3–1	3–0	3–0	3–0	1–1	1–0	2–1		5–1	1–1	2–1	1–0
Rudar Pljevlja	1–0	2–1	5–0	1–0	1–3	3–1	1–1	1–1		1–0	2–1	3–0
Sartid	3–0	4–1	2–0	1–0	0–0	2–3	2–1	4–1	5–0		1–0	3–1
Spartak Subotica	1–0	3–1	4–2	1–1	1–1	2–1	2–4	1–0	3–1	0–1		1–0
Sutjeska	1–0	4–0	4–1	1–1	2–0	2–2	1–0	1–1	1–2	0–0	2–1	

Legend: Blue = home team win; Yellow = draw; Red = away team win.

==== Third round ====
Home \ Away	BEČ	BOR	BVA	LOZ	OFK	PRI	RDK	RNI	RUD	SAR	SPA	SUT
Bečej			1–0			0–1	0–1	0–0				2–2
Borac Čačak	2–0		0–2	2–2					3–0			2–1
Budućnost Valjevo				1–0		3–1		1–0	1–1			
Loznica	2–1				0–2				1–1	0–2	1–2	
OFK Beograd	1–0	3–2	1–1				5–2	4–1				2–1
Priština		0–0		2–0	0–0				3–0	0–1	0–0	
Radnički Kragujevac		4–1	3–2	2–0		2–2		0–0	2–0		1–2	
Radnički Niš		1–1		0–0		0–3			5–3	1–0	1–1	
Rudar Pljevlja	5–1				1–0					0–1	1–0	2–1
Sartid	1–0	2–0	3–1		0–0		1–0					2–0
Spartak Subotica	3–0	2–0	2–1		5–3					5–0		2–0
Sutjeska			1–1	2–0		2–1	0–0	1–2				

Legend: Blue = home team win; Yellow = draw; Red = away team win.

== Relegation playoff ==
Team 1	Agg.	Team 2	1st leg	2nd leg
Čukarički	1–1 (4–5 p)	Radnički Kragujevac	1–0	0–1

== Winning squad ==
Champions: FK Obilić (Coach: Dragan Okuka)

Players (league matches/goals)

- (Federal Republic of Yugoslavia) Milan Lešnjak
- (Federal Republic of Yugoslavia) Miroslav Savić (32/1)
- (Federal Republic of Yugoslavia) Nenad Lukić (32/0)
- (Federal Republic of Yugoslavia) Saša Kovačević (30/7)
- (Federal Republic of Yugoslavia) Zoran Ranković (29/23)
- (Federal Republic of Yugoslavia) Nenad Grozdić (29/4)
- (Federal Republic of Yugoslavia) Kuzman Babeu (29/4)
- (Federal Republic of Yugoslavia) Dragan Šarac (29/3)
- (Federal Republic of Yugoslavia) Marjan Živković (28/7)
- (Federal Republic of Yugoslavia) Živojin Juškić (28/4)
- (Federal Republic of Yugoslavia) Darko Nović (27/1)
- (Federal Republic of Yugoslavia) Ivan Vukomanović (24/3)
- (Federal Republic of Yugoslavia) Saša Viciknez (16/3)
- (Bosnia and Herzegovina) Sahmir Garčević (16/1)
- (Federal Republic of Yugoslavia) Darko Vargec (14/0)
- (Federal Republic of Yugoslavia) Goran Serafimović (8/0)
- (Federal Republic of Yugoslavia) Siniša Jelić (7/3)
- (Federal Republic of Yugoslavia) Veselin Popović (7/3)
- (Federal Republic of Yugoslavia) Ivan Litera (7/2)
- (Federal Republic of Yugoslavia) Predrag Filipović (7/0)
- (Federal Republic of Yugoslavia) Miroslav Milošević (7/0)
- (Federal Republic of Yugoslavia) Vladan Milosavljević (5/0)
- (Federal Republic of Yugoslavia) Duško Košutić (2/0)
- (Federal Republic of Yugoslavia) Zoran Ivić (2/0)
- (Federal Republic of Yugoslavia) Mirko Babić (1/1)
- (Bosnia and Herzegovina) Radovan Gajić (1/0)
- (Federal Republic of Yugoslavia) Slaviša Mitić (1/0)

== Top goalscorers ==
Rank	Player	Club	Goals
1	(Federal Republic of Yugoslavia) Saša Marković	Red Star	27
2	(Federal Republic of Yugoslavia) Zoran Ranković	Obilić	23
3	(Federal Republic of Yugoslavia) Dejan Stanković	Red Star	15
4	(Federal Republic of Yugoslavia) Zoran Jovičić	Red Star	13
5	(Federal Republic of Yugoslavia) Dragan Isailović	Partizan	12
6	(Federal Republic of Yugoslavia) Aleksandar Jović	Čukarički	11
6	(Federal Republic of Yugoslavia) Zoran Janković	Železnik	11
6	(Federal Republic of Yugoslavia) Goran Obradović	Partizan	11
9	(Federal Republic of Yugoslavia) Radovan Marković	Mladost Lučani	10
9	(Federal Republic of Yugoslavia) Dragan Jović	Proleter Zrenjanin	10

== External sources ==
- Obilic team in Tripod.com
