= Zoran Jovičić (footballer) =

Serbian footballer

Personal information
- Date of birth: 17 April 1973 (age 53)
- Place of birth: Belgrade, SFR Yugoslavia
- Height: 1.82 m (6 ft 0 in)
- Position: Forward

Youth career
- Red Star Belgrade

Senior career*
Years	Team	Apps	(Gls)
1991–1993	Red Star Belgrade	1	(0)
1991–1992	→ Sutjeska Nikšić (loan)	20	(8)
1993	→ Borac Banja Luka (loan)	16	(0)
1993–1995	Ethnikos Piraeus	57	(19)
1995–1998	Red Star Belgrade	62	(37)
1998–2003	Sampdoria	33	(5)
2003–2005	Caen	30	(1)
2005–2006	Panionios	2	(0)
Total		221	(70)

International career
1996–1997	FR Yugoslavia	2	(1)
- * Club domestic league appearances and goals

Zoran Jovičić (Serbian Cyrillic: Зоран Joвичић; born 17 April 1973) is a Serbian retired professional footballer who played as a forward.

Jovičić played in two friendly matches for FR Yugoslavia in 1996 and 1997.
