= 1995–96 First League of FR Yugoslavia =

First League of FR Yugoslavia
- Season: 1995–96
- Champions: Partizan; 14th domestic title
- Champions League: Partizan
- UEFA Cup: Vojvodina
- Cup Winners' Cup: Red Star
- Intertoto Cup: Zemun; Čukarički
- Top goalscorer: Vojislav Budimirović (23)

Statistics of First League of FR Yugoslavia (Serbian: Пpвa савезна лига, Prva savezna liga) for the 1995–96 season.

== Overview ==
Just as in the two previous seasons, the league was divided into 2 groups, A and B, consisting each one of 10 clubs. Both groups were played in league system. By winter break all clubs in each group meet each other twice, home and away, with the bottom four classified from A group moving to the group B, and being replaced by the top four from the B group. At the end of the season the same situation happened with four teams being replaced from A and B groups, adding the fact that the bottom two clubs from the B group were relegated into the Second League of FR Yugoslavia for the next season and replaced by the top two from that league.

At the end of the season FK Partizan became champions.

The league top-scorer was FK Čukarički striker Vojislav Budimirović with 23 goals.

The relegated clubs were FK Napredak Kruševac and FK Radnički Beograd.

== Autumn ==
=== IA league ===
==== Table ====
Pos	Team	Pld	W	D	L	GF	GA	GD	Pts	Result
1	Partizan	18	14	4	0	52	9	+43	46	
2	Red Star	18	14	1	3	49	16	+33	43	
3	Vojvodina	18	11	4	3	34	14	+20	37	
4	Radnički Niš	18	7	6	5	23	19	+4	27	
5	Bečej	18	7	6	5	28	16	+12	27	
6	Proleter Zrenjanin	18	6	3	9	19	31	−12	21	
7	Zemun	18	5	4	9	20	26	−6	19	Transfer to Spring IB League
8	OFK Beograd	18	2	5	11	20	56	−36	11	Transfer to Spring IB League
9	Napredak Kruševac	18	2	4	12	14	46	−32	10	Transfer to Spring IB League
10	Budućnost Podgorica	18	2	3	13	14	40	−26	9	Transfer to Spring IB League

==== Results ====
Home \ Away	BEČ	BUD	NAP	OFK	PAR	PRO	RNI	RSB	VOJ	ZEM
Bečej		2–0	6–0	3–1	1–1	1–1	1–2	1–3	0–0	3–0
Budućnost Podgorica	1–1		1–1	2–3	1–5	3–1	1–0	1–4	1–2	1–2
Napredak Kruševac	2–2	1–0		1–1	1–3	0–3	2–3	0–1	2–3	1–0
OFK Beograd	0–4	1–1	2–2		1–8	3–1	1–1	2–6	0–1	1–1
Partizan	2–1	3–0	4–0	6–0		2–0	1–1	1–1	1–0	5–0
Proleter Zrenjanin	0–1	1–0	3–1	3–2	0–3		0–0	0–3	1–0	1–0
Radnički Niš	0–0	2–0	4–0	3–0	1–3	2–0		0–2	0–0	2–1
Red Star	0–1	5–1	3–0	4–1	0–1	5–1	4–0		2–1	2–1
Vojvodina	2–0	3–0	6–0	3–0	1–1	4–2	2–1	3–2		2–0
Zemun	1–0	3–0	1–0	6–1	0–2	1–1	1–1	1–2	1–1	

Source: EU-Football.info
Legend: Blue = home team win; Yellow = draw; Red = away team win.

=== IB league ===
==== Table ====
Pos	Team	Pld	W	D	L	GF	GA	GD	Pts	Result
1	Čukarički	18	10	8	0	34	6	+28	38	Transfer to Spring IA League
2	Rad	18	9	5	4	32	12	+20	32	Transfer to Spring IA League
3	Mladost Lučani	18	8	5	5	26	20	+6	29	Transfer to Spring IA League
4	Sloboda Užice	18	8	3	7	18	23	−5	27	Transfer to Spring IA League
5	Hajduk Kula	18	5	8	5	16	18	−2	23	
6	Radnički Beograd	18	6	4	8	29	32	−3	22	
7	Obilić	18	6	4	8	28	34	−6	22	
8	Mladost Bački Jarak	18	5	5	8	22	36	−14	20	
9	Borac Čačak	18	4	4	10	15	25	−10	16	
10	Loznica	18	3	6	9	24	38	−14	15	

==== Results ====
Home \ Away	BOR	ČUK	HAJ	LOZ	MBJ	MLU	OBI	RAD	RNB	SLO
Borac Čačak		0–1	1–0	4–0	1–0	0–0	2–3	2–1	0–2	1–2
Čukarički	0–0		3–0	4–2	3–0	4–0	3–0	0–0	3–1	6–0
Hajduk Kula	1–0	0–0		2–2	2–1	1–1	3–0	3–3	2–1	0–0
Loznica	4–0	1–4	1–1		2–2	2–2	2–1	1–1	1–5	1–0
Mladost Bački Jarak	0–0	1–1	1–0	2–1		1–1	4–2	0–4	5–2	2–1
Mladost Lučani	2–0	0–0	2–0	2–1	3–1		2–1	2–1	5–0	0–1
Obilić	2–2	1–1	0–1	3–1	1–1	3–1		3–0	2–0	2–1
Rad	2–0	0–0	2–0	1–0	6–0	2–0	5–0		3–0	0–1
Radnički Beograd	2–1	0–0	0–0	2–2	4–1	2–0	3–3	0–1		3–0
Sloboda Užice	3–1	0–1	0–0	2–0	2–0	0–3	2–1	0–0	3–2	

Source: EU-Football.info
Legend: Blue = home team win; Yellow = draw; Red = away team win.

== Spring ==
=== IA league ===
==== Table ====
Pos	Team	Pld	W	D	L	GF	GA	GD	BP	Pts	Qualification or relegation
1	Partizan (C)	18	13	3	2	51	17	+34	18	60	Qualification for UEFA Cup preliminary round
2	Red Star	18	9	5	4	27	16	+11	16	48	Qualification for Cup Winners' Cup qualifying round
3	Vojvodina	18	8	6	4	33	19	+14	13	43	Qualification for UEFA Cup preliminary round
4	Bečej	18	9	6	3	18	19	−1	8	41	Qualification for UEFA Cup preliminary round
5	Mladost Lučani	18	8	2	8	24	27	−3	6	32	
6	Čukarički	18	4	6	8	23	23	0	11	29	Qualification for Intertoto Cup group stage
7	Rad	18	5	5	8	21	23	−2	8	28	
8	Proleter Zrenjanin	18	6	3	9	24	28	−4	6	27	
9	Radnički Niš	18	4	5	9	19	37	−18	9	26	Transfer to IB League
10	Sloboda Užice	18	2	3	13	10	41	−31	5	14	Transfer to IB League

(C) Champions

==== Results ====
Home \ Away	BEČ	ČUK	MLA	PAR	PRO	RAD	RNI	RSB	SLO	VOJ
Bečej		1–0	1–0	0–0	1–0	1–0	2–1	1–0	1–0	1–0
Čukarički	1–1		1–1	1–2	0–1	3–1	4–1	0–0	3–0	0–1
Mladost Lučani	2–0	2–1		1–0	0–1	3–1	4–1	3–2	5–1	1–2
Partizan	4–1	4–2	5–0		4–1	2–1	4–0	0–0	5–0	6–3
Proleter Zrenjanin	2–2	5–3	0–2	0–1		4–3	0–1	3–1	3–0	0–2
Rad	0–1	1–1	0–0	2–1	1–0		3–1	0–1	4–0	2–2
Radnički Niš	2–2	0–2	2–0	1–4	1–1	0–0		1–3	2–1	3–1
Red Star	1–1	1–0	2–0	2–3	3–1	3–1	1–1		1–0	1–0
Sloboda Užice	1–1	0–0	2–0	1–5	2–1	0–1	1–1	0–4		1–2
Vojvodina	5–0	1–1	5–0	1–1	1–1	0–0	4–0	1–1	2–0	

Source: EU-Football.info
Legend: Blue = home team win; Yellow = draw; Red = away team win.

=== IB league ===
==== Table ====
Pos	Team	Pld	W	D	L	GF	GA	GD	BP	Pts	Qualification or relegation
1	Zemun	18	10	3	5	29	14	+15	7	40	Qualification for Intertoto Cup group stage Transfer to IA League
2	Borac Čačak	18	10	2	6	24	13	+11	2	34	Transfer to IA League
3	Hajduk Kula	18	8	4	6	20	20	0	6	34	Transfer to IA League
4	Budućnost Podgorica	18	8	5	5	15	14	+1	3	32	Qualification for IA play-off
5	Obilić	18	8	2	8	20	18	+2	5	31	
6	OFK Beograd	18	8	3	7	23	22	+1	4	31	
7	Loznica	18	7	4	7	23	22	+1	2	27	
8	Mladost Bački Jarak	18	7	2	9	18	25	−7	4	27	
9	Napredak Kruševac (R)	18	6	3	9	22	27	−5	3	24	Qualification for relegation play-off
10	Radnički Beograd (R)	18	2	4	12	13	32	−19	7	17	Relegation to Second League of FR Yugoslavia

(R) Relegated

==== Results ====
Home \ Away	BOR	BUD	HAJ	LOZ	MBJ	NAP	OBI	OFK	RNB	ZEM
Borac Čačak		2–0	2–0	1–1	1–0	1–0	0–1	4–0	2–1	2–1
Budućnost Podgorica	1–1		0–1	2–1	1–0	2–0	1–0	0–0	2–0	0–0
Hajduk Kula	1–0	2–0		0–0	3–0	0–0	3–0	2–1	3–0	0–0
Loznica	2–1	1–1	2–0		2–1	2–3	2–0	1–3	2–0	3–2
Mladost Bački Jarak	1–0	0–0	1–2	2–1		2–0	0–1	4–1	1–1	1–0
Napredak Kruševac	0–1	3–1	5–2	2–1	1–2		3–1	2–1	2–3	1–1
Obilić	0–2	0–1	2–0	0–0	5–1	2–0		1–1	5–1	1–0
OFK Beograd	1–0	2–0	2–0	2–0	3–0	2–0	0–1		0–0	0–2
Radnički Beograd	0–3	0–1	1–1	1–2	0–1	0–0	2–0	2–3		0–2
Zemun	3–1	1–2	4–0	1–0	3–1	3–0	1–0	3–1	2–1	

Source: EU-Football.info
Legend: Blue = home team win; Yellow = draw; Red = away team win.

== IA Playoff ==
Team 1	Agg.	Team 2	1st leg	2nd leg
Budućnost Valjevo	1–3	Budućnost Podgorica	1–0	0–3

== Relegation playoff ==
Team 1	Agg.	Team 2	1st leg	2nd leg
Rudar Pljevlja	4–2	Napredak Kruševac	2–0	2–2

== Winning squad ==
Champions: Partizan Belgrade (Coach: Ljubiša Tumbaković)

Players (league matches/league goals)

- (Federal Republic of Yugoslavia) Ivica Kralj
- (Bosnia and Herzegovina) Nikola Damjanac
- (North Macedonia) Viktor Trenevski
- (Federal Republic of Yugoslavia) Bratislav Mijalković
- (Federal Republic of Yugoslavia) Darko Tešović
- (North Macedonia) Georgi Hristov
- (Federal Republic of Yugoslavia) Ivan Tomić
- (Federal Republic of Yugoslavia) Dražen Bolić
- (Federal Republic of Yugoslavia) Mladen Krstajić
- (Federal Republic of Yugoslavia) Predrag Pažin
- (Federal Republic of Yugoslavia) Đorđe Svetličić
- (Federal Republic of Yugoslavia) Dejan Peković
- (Federal Republic of Yugoslavia) Dejan Vukićević
- (Federal Republic of Yugoslavia) Damir Čakar
- (Federal Republic of Yugoslavia) Dragan Ćirić
- (Federal Republic of Yugoslavia) Zoran Mirković
- (Federal Republic of Yugoslavia) Niša Saveljić
- (Federal Republic of Yugoslavia) Zoran Đurić
- (Federal Republic of Yugoslavia) Igor Taševski
- (Federal Republic of Yugoslavia) Albert Nađ
- (Federal Republic of Yugoslavia) Marko Marković
- (Federal Republic of Yugoslavia) Rahim Beširović

== Top goalscorers ==
Rank	Player	Club	Goals
1	(Federal Republic of Yugoslavia) Vojislav Budimirović	Čukarički	23
2	(Federal Republic of Yugoslavia) Nebojša Krupniković	Red Star	19
3	(Federal Republic of Yugoslavia) Damir Čakar	Partizan	16
4	(Federal Republic of Yugoslavia) Dragan Ćirić	Partizan	15
5	(North Macedonia) Milan Stojanoski	Proleter Zrenjanin	13
5	(Federal Republic of Yugoslavia) Darko Kovačević	Red Star	13
5	(Federal Republic of Yugoslavia) Darko Tešović	Partizan	13
8	(Federal Republic of Yugoslavia) Petar Puača	OFK Beograd/Red Star	11
8	(Federal Republic of Yugoslavia) Rahim Beširović	Partizan	11
10	(Federal Republic of Yugoslavia) Zoran Ćirić	Bečej	9
10	(North Macedonia) Georgi Hristov	Partizan	9
10	(Federal Republic of Yugoslavia) Goran Šaula	Vojvodina	9
