= 1996–97 First League of FR Yugoslavia =

Football tournament edition

First League of FR Yugoslavia
- Season: 1996–97
- Champions: Partizan; 15th domestic title
- Champions League: Partizan
- UEFA Cup: Vojvodina
- Cup Winners' Cup: Red Star
- Intertoto Cup: Hajduk Kula; Proleter Zrenjanin; Čukarički
- Goals: 533
- Top goalscorer: Zoran Jovičić (21)

The 1996–97 First League of FR Yugoslavia was the fifth season of the FR Yugoslavia's top-level football league since its establishment.

== Overview ==
For the fourth season in a raw that the league was divided in 2 groups, A and B, consisting each of 10 clubs. Both groups were played in league system. By winter break all clubs in each group meet each other twice, home and away, with the bottom four classified from A group moving to the group B, and being replaced by the top four from the B group. At the end of the season the same situation happened with four teams being replaced from A and B groups, adding the fact that the bottom three clubs from the B group were relegated into the Second League of FR Yugoslavia for the next season and replaced by the top three from that league.

At the end of the season FK Partizan became the champions in the second consecutive year.

The league top-scorer was Red Star Belgrade striker Zoran Jovičić with 21 goals.

The relegated clubs were OFK Kikinda, FK Sloboda Užice and FK Mladost Bački Jarak.

== Teams ==
Location of teams in the 1996–97 First League
Red: 1A League; Blue: 1B League.

=== 1A League ===
| Club | City | Stadium | Capacity |
|---|---|---|---|
| Partizan | Belgrade | Partizan Stadium | 32,710 |
| Red Star | Belgrade | Red Star Stadium | 55,538 |
| Vojvodina | Novi Sad | Karađorđe Stadium | 17,204 |
| Zemun | Zemun, Belgrade | Zemun Stadium | 10,000 |
| Rad | Belgrade | Stadion Kralj Petar I | 6,000 |
| Proleter | Zrenjanin | Stadion Karađorđev park | 13,500 |
| Hajduk Kula | Kula | Stadion Hajduk | 6,000 |
| Budućnost Podgorica | Podgorica | Podgorica City Stadium | 12,000 |
| Bečej | Bečej | Stadion kraj Tise | 3,000 |
| Borac | Čačak | Čačak Stadium | 6,000 |
| Mladost Lučani | Lučani | Mladost Stadium | 8,000 |
| Čukarički | Belgrade | Stadion Čukarički | 7,000 |

=== 1B League ===
| Club | City | Stadium | Capacity |
|---|---|---|---|
| Mladost Bački Jarak | Bački Jarak | Stadion Livadice | 3,000 |
| Sloboda | Užice | Užice City Stadium | 12,000 |
| Loznica | Loznica | Stadion Lagator | 4,000 |
| Obilić | Belgrade | FK Obilić Stadium | 4,500 |
| Sutjeska | Nikšić | Gradski stadion (Nikšić) | 10,800 |
| OFK Beograd | Karaburma, Belgrade | Omladinski Stadium | 20,000 |
| Spartak | Subotica | Subotica City Stadium | 13,000 |
| Radnički Niš | Niš | Čair Stadium | 18,000 |
| Železnik | Belgrade | Železnik Stadium | 8,000 |
| Budućnost Valjevo | Valjevo | Park Pećina | 6,000 |
| OFK Kikinda | Kikinda | Kikinda City Stadium | 6,000 |
| Rudar Pljevlja | Pljevlja | Stadion pod Golubinjom | 10,000 |

== IA league ==
=== Table ===
| Pos | Team | Pld | W | D | L | GF | GA | GD | Pts | Qualification or relegation |
|---|---|---|---|---|---|---|---|---|---|---|
| 1 | Partizan (C) | 33 | 26 | 6 | 1 | 88 | 17 | +71 | 84 | Qualification for Champions League first qualifying round |
| 2 | Red Star | 33 | 25 | 3 | 5 | 79 | 30 | +49 | 78 | Qualification for Cup Winners' Cup qualifying round |
| 3 | Vojvodina | 33 | 15 | 8 | 10 | 49 | 35 | +14 | 53 | Qualification for UEFA Cup first qualifying round |
| 4 | Hajduk Kula | 33 | 12 | 8 | 13 | 34 | 37 | −3 | 44 | Qualification for Intertoto Cup group stage |
| 5 | Proleter Zrenjanin | 33 | 12 | 6 | 15 | 48 | 46 | +2 | 42 | Qualification for Intertoto Cup group stage |
| 6 | Čukarički | 33 | 11 | 8 | 14 | 35 | 46 | −11 | 41 | Qualification for Intertoto Cup group stage |
| 7 | Zemun | 33 | 10 | 11 | 12 | 40 | 37 | +3 | 41 | |
| 8 | Mladost Lučani | 33 | 12 | 5 | 16 | 45 | 59 | −14 | 41 | |
| 9 | Rad | 33 | 10 | 10 | 13 | 33 | 38 | −5 | 40 | |
| 10 | Budućnost Podgorica | 33 | 11 | 6 | 16 | 26 | 44 | −18 | 39 | Qualification for IA/IB play-off |
| 11 | Bečej | 33 | 11 | 5 | 17 | 34 | 48 | −14 | 38 | Transfer to IB League |
| 12 | Borac Čačak | 33 | 4 | 2 | 27 | 22 | 93 | −71 | 14 | Transfer to IB League |

(C) Champions

=== Results ===
==== First and second round ====
| Home \ Away | BEČ | BOR | BPO | ČUK | HAJ | MLA | PAR | PRO | RAD | RSB | VOJ | ZEM |
|---|---|---|---|---|---|---|---|---|---|---|---|---|
| Bečej | | 2–0 | 2–0 | 3–0 | 0–0 | 1–1 | 2–3 | 3–0 | 1–0 | 0–0 | 0–0 | 2–3 |
| Borac Čačak | 2–1 | | 2–1 | 0–0 | 1–2 | 1–2 | 0–10 | 3–2 | 0–2 | 1–3 | 0–2 | 0–2 |
| Budućnost Podgorica | 3–1 | 1–0 | | 2–0 | 1–0 | 3–2 | 0–3 | 1–1 | 0–0 | 1–3 | 1–0 | 2–1 |
| Čukarički | 1–0 | 4–0 | 0–0 | | 0–2 | 2–1 | 1–3 | 3–1 | 2–2 | 0–2 | 1–0 | 2–1 |
| Hajduk Kula | 2–0 | 2–0 | 0–0 | 0–0 | | 1–0 | 1–2 | 2–0 | 1–0 | 0–1 | 1–1 | 2–2 |
| Mladost Lučani | 3–0 | 3–2 | 1–0 | 2–1 | 2–1 | | 0–1 | 4–1 | 2–0 | 1–0 | 2–2 | 0–0 |
| Partizan | 6–0 | 3–0 | 1–0 | 4–1 | 2–1 | 2–0 | | 3–1 | 2–1 | 3–0 | 1–1 | 0–0 |
| Proleter Zrenjanin | 2–1 | 4–0 | 3–1 | 1–0 | 5–0 | 6–1 | 0–2 | | 0–0 | 1–2 | 1–3 | 2–1 |
| Rad | 1–2 | 3–0 | 1–0 | 3–0 | 1–1 | 1–2 | 0–5 | 0–0 | | 1–2 | 0–0 | 2–1 |
| Red Star | 1–0 | 5–0 | 2–0 | 8–1 | 3–0 | 2–1 | 1–3 | 3–1 | 5–1 | | 3–1 | 0–0 |
| Vojvodina | 3–0 | 5–1 | 2–0 | 1–0 | 1–0 | 2–1 | 1–1 | 2–0 | 1–1 | 0–3 | | 2–1 |
| Zemun | 1–1 | 2–1 | 2–0 | 1–1 | 1–1 | 3–0 | 0–2 | 2–1 | 1–0 | 1–2 | 0–1 | |

Source: Soccerway
Legend: Blue = home team win; Yellow = draw; Red = away team win.

==== Third round ====
| Home \ Away | BEČ | BOR | BPO | ČUK | HAJ | MLA | PAR | PRO | RAD | RSB | VOJ | ZEM |
|---|---|---|---|---|---|---|---|---|---|---|---|---|
| Bečej | | | 2–0 | 1–0 | | | 0–3 | | | | 3–2 | 2–1 |
| Borac Čačak | 1–3 | | 2–0 | 0–2 | | | | 2–2 | 1–2 | | | |
| Budućnost Podgorica | | | | 1–0 | | | 1–1 | 1–1 | | | 2–1 | 2–1 |
| Čukarički | | | | | 1–1 | 2–1 | | 2–0 | 1–1 | 4–1 | | |
| Hajduk Kula | 2–0 | 3–0 | 2–0 | | | 2–1 | | | 1–0 | 1–3 | | |
| Mladost Lučani | 1–0 | 5–2 | 0–1 | | | | | | 1–1 | 2–5 | | 2–2 |
| Partizan | | 4–0 | | 1–1 | 2–0 | 7–0 | | 3–1 | | 2–1 | | |
| Proleter Zrenjanin | 2–0 | | | | 2–1 | 1–0 | | | 4–1 | 0–0 | | |
| Rad | 3–1 | | 3–0 | | | 1–2 | 1–0 | | | | 1–0 | 0–0 |
| Red Star | 1–0 | 7–0 | 4–1 | | | | | | 1–0 | | 4–3 | 1–0 |
| Vojvodina | | 2–0 | | 2–1 | 2–0 | 4–1 | 0–2 | 0–1 | | | | |
| Zemun | | 2–0 | | 0–1 | 3–1 | | 1–1 | 2–1 | | | 2–2 | |

Source: Soccerway
Legend: Blue = home team win; Yellow = draw; Red = away team win.

== IB league ==
=== Table ===
| Pos | Team | Pld | W | D | L | GF | GA | GD | Pts | Qualification or relegation |
|---|---|---|---|---|---|---|---|---|---|---|
| 1 | Obilić | 33 | 25 | 4 | 4 | 65 | 16 | +49 | 79 | Transfer to IA League |
| 2 | Železnik | 33 | 20 | 4 | 9 | 54 | 34 | +20 | 64 | Transfer to IA League |
| 3 | Loznica | 33 | 20 | 1 | 12 | 48 | 25 | +23 | 61 | Qualification for IA/IB play-off |
| 4 | Radnički Niš | 33 | 16 | 8 | 9 | 66 | 36 | +30 | 56 | |
| 5 | OFK Beograd | 33 | 16 | 8 | 9 | 44 | 28 | +16 | 56 | |
| 6 | Rudar Pljevlja | 33 | 14 | 4 | 15 | 44 | 46 | −2 | 46 | |
| 7 | Budućnost Valjevo | 33 | 11 | 8 | 14 | 42 | 49 | −7 | 41 | |
| 8 | Sutjeska | 33 | 12 | 4 | 17 | 43 | 56 | −13 | 40 | |
| 9 | OFK Kikinda (R) | 33 | 8 | 7 | 18 | 16 | 41 | −25 | 31 | Qualification for relegation play-off |
| 10 | Spartak Subotica | 33 | 8 | 6 | 19 | 27 | 60 | −33 | 30 | Qualification for relegation play-off |
| 11 | Sloboda Užice (R) | 33 | 7 | 7 | 19 | 27 | 52 | −25 | 28 | Relegation to Second League of FR Yugoslavia |
| 12 | Mladost Bački Jarak (R) | 33 | 5 | 11 | 17 | 23 | 56 | −33 | 26 | Relegation to Second League of FR Yugoslavia |

(R) Relegated

=== Results ===
==== First and second round ====
| Home \ Away | BVA | KIK | LOZ | MBJ | OBI | OFK | RNI | RUD | SLO | SPA | SUT | ŽEL |
|---|---|---|---|---|---|---|---|---|---|---|---|---|
| Budućnost Valjevo | | 1–0 | 0–1 | 3–2 | 1–1 | 0–1 | 1–1 | 1–0 | 3–1 | 6–2 | 4–1 | 2–1 |
| Kikinda | 2–0 | | 1–2 | 3–0 | 0–1 | 0–0 | 1–0 | 1–0 | 1–0 | 1–0 | 1–0 | 0–2 |
| Loznica | 1–0 | 3–1 | | 1–0 | 0–1 | 3–0 | 4–2 | 2–1 | 3–0 | 4–1 | 2–0 | 2–0 |
| Mladost Bački Jarak | 0–1 | 0–0 | 0–0 | | 0–3 | 0–0 | 0–0 | 1–1 | 1–0 | 0–1 | 2–1 | 1–2 |
| Obilić | 2–0 | 3–1 | 1–0 | 3–0 | | 2–0 | 2–0 | 3–1 | 4–1 | 4–0 | 3–0 | 2–0 |
| OFK Beograd | 2–1 | 2–0 | 2–0 | 2–2 | 1–2 | | 1–1 | 3–0 | 1–0 | 3–0 | 1–0 | 0–2 |
| Radnički Niš | 7–2 | 2–0 | 1–0 | 2–0 | 0–1 | 1–2 | | 2–0 | 1–0 | 1–0 | 4–0 | 3–1 |
| Rudar Pljevlja | 2–0 | 0–1 | 0–3 | 4–0 | 1–0 | 2–0 | 1–1 | | 4–2 | 6–0 | 2–0 | 3–0 |
| Sloboda Užice | 0–0 | 2–0 | 1–2 | 4–0 | 0–2 | 1–1 | 1–1 | 1–1 | | 3–0 | 0–0 | 1–0 |
| Spartak Subotica | 1–2 | 1–0 | 2–1 | 2–1 | 0–1 | 1–1 | 0–5 | 1–4 | 1–2 | | 3–0 | 1–1 |
| Sutjeska | 3–2 | 2–1 | 1–0 | 0–0 | 2–3 | 1–0 | 4–1 | 3–0 | 3–2 | 3–0 | | 3–1 |
| Železnik | 3–1 | 2–0 | 1–0 | 4–1 | 0–0 | 0–1 | 3–0 | 0–1 | 1–0 | 3–0 | 2–1 | |

Legend: Blue = home team win; Yellow = draw; Red = away team win.

==== Third round ====
| Home \ Away | BVA | KIK | LOZ | MBJ | OBI | OFK | RNI | RUD | SLO | SPA | SUT | ŽEL |
|---|---|---|---|---|---|---|---|---|---|---|---|---|
| Budućnost Valjevo | | | | | 1–0 | 2–2 | 2–2 | | 3–0 | | 1–1 | |
| Kikinda | 0–0 | | | | 0–0 | 0–0 | 0–5 | | 0–0 | | | |
| Loznica | 4–0 | 2–0 | | 1–2 | | 0–1 | 3–2 | | | 1–0 | | |
| Mladost Bački Jarak | 2–1 | 0–0 | | | | | | | 3–1 | 0–0 | 1–1 | |
| Obilić | | | 1–0 | 5–1 | | | | 4–1 | 3–0 | | 2–0 | 2–2 |
| OFK Beograd | | | | 3–0 | 0–3 | | | 4–0 | 4–0 | | 3–0 | 1–2 |
| Radnički Niš | | | | 1–1 | 1–0 | 2–1 | | 4–1 | 4–0 | | 7–0 | |
| Rudar Pljevlja | 1–0 | 2–0 | 2–0 | 2–0 | | | | | | 0–1 | | 0–1 |
| Sloboda Užice | | | 0–1 | | | | | 1–1 | | 1–0 | 2–1 | 0–2 |
| Spartak Subotica | 1–1 | 4–0 | | | 2–1 | 0–1 | 1–1 | | | | | |
| Sutjeska | | 2–0 | 0–2 | | | | | 6–0 | | 1–0 | | 3–4 |
| Železnik | 2–0 | 3–1 | 1–0 | 4–2 | | | 3–1 | | | 1–1 | | |

Legend: Blue = home team win; Yellow = draw; Red = away team win.

== IA/IB Playoff ==
| Team 1 | Agg. | Team 2 | 1st leg | 2nd leg |
|---|---|---|---|---|
| Loznica | 0–1 | Budućnost Podgorica | 0–0 | 0–1 |

== Relegation playoff ==
| Team 1 | Agg. | Team 2 | 1st leg | 2nd leg |
|---|---|---|---|---|
| Kikinda | 2–4 | Radnički Kragujevac | 1–2 | 1–2 |
| Spartak Subotica | 3–1 | Palilulac Beograd | 2–1 | 1–0 |

== Winning squad ==
Champions: Partizan Belgrade (Coach: Ljubiša Tumbaković)

Players (league matches/league goals)

- (Federal Republic of Yugoslavia) Ivica Kralj (goalkeeper)
- (Bosnia and Herzegovina) Nikola Damjanac (goalkeeper)
- (North Macedonia) Viktor Trenevski
- (Federal Republic of Yugoslavia) Bratislav Mijalković
- (Federal Republic of Yugoslavia) Darko Tešović
- (North Macedonia) Georgi Hristov
- (Federal Republic of Yugoslavia) Ivan Tomić
- (Federal Republic of Yugoslavia) Dražen Bolić
- (Federal Republic of Yugoslavia) Mladen Krstajić
- (Federal Republic of Yugoslavia) Predrag Pažin
- (Federal Republic of Yugoslavia) Đorđe Svetličić
- (Federal Republic of Yugoslavia) Dejan Peković
- (Federal Republic of Yugoslavia) Dejan Vukićević
- (Federal Republic of Yugoslavia) Damir Čakar
- (Federal Republic of Yugoslavia) Dragan Ćirić
- (Federal Republic of Yugoslavia) Niša Saveljić
- (Federal Republic of Yugoslavia) Igor Taševski

== Top goalscorers ==
| Rank | Player | Club | Goals |
|---|---|---|---|
| 1 | (Federal Republic of Yugoslavia) Zoran Jovičić | Red Star | 21 |
| 2 | (Federal Republic of Yugoslavia) Damir Čakar | Partizan | 20 |
| 3 | (Federal Republic of Yugoslavia) Damir Stojak | Vojvodina | 16 |
| 4 | (Federal Republic of Yugoslavia) Dragan Mićić | Red Star | 14 |
| 5 | (Federal Republic of Yugoslavia) Branko Stojanović | Mladost Lučani | 12 |
| 5 | (Federal Republic of Yugoslavia) Darko Pivaljević | Mladost Lučani | 12 |
| 7 | (North Macedonia) Milan Stojanoski | Proleter Zrenjanin | 11 |
| 8 | (Federal Republic of Yugoslavia) Ivan Tomić | Partizan | 10 |
| 8 | (Federal Republic of Yugoslavia) Dejan Stanković | Red Star | 10 |
