= FK Obilić =

Obilić
- Full name: Fudbalski klub Obilić
- Nickname: Vitezovi (The Knights)
- Founded: 1 August 1924; 102 years ago
- Ground: Obilić Stadium
- Capacity: 4,600
- President: Goran Zelenović
- 2014-15: Inter-municipal league Belgrade group "A", 8th
Home colours	Away colours

Fudbalski klub Obilić (Serbian Cyrillic: Фудбалски клуб Обилић) is a Serbian football club based in Vračar, a neighbourhood of Belgrade. It was named after medieval Serbian hero Miloš Obilić, a legendary 14th-century knight.

In its long history, Obilić's most notable success occurred in 1998, when it became only the third club since the breakup of Yugoslavia to win the national league, winning the 1997–98 season. As of 2025, one of the two Belgrade football giants, Crvena Zvezda and Partizan, have won every other year. At the time, it was bankrolled by Serbian warlord Arkan.

Since the 2001–02 season, when it finished in fourth place, Obilić has declined steeply: a club which once competed in European club competitions was relegated to the lowest tier of the Serbian football league system and now no longer competes in any recognised competition (with the exception of the women's team).

== History ==
=== Beginnings (1924–44) ===
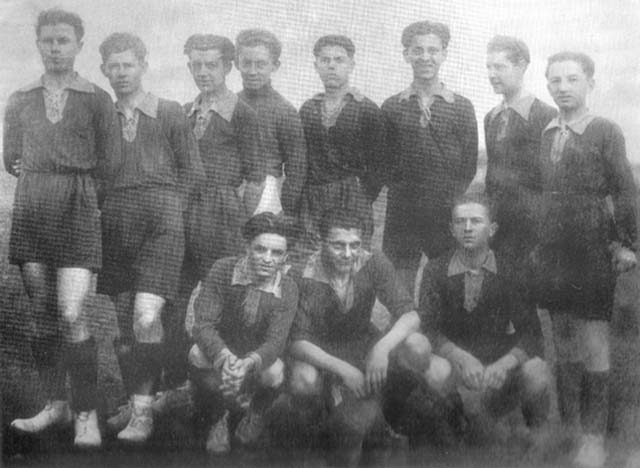
First team of Obilić in 1924

The club was founded in 1924 by the young Serbs Milan Petrović, Boža Popović, Danilo "Dača" Anastasijević, Petar Daničić, Dragutin Volić, and Svetislav Bošnjaković, the first secretary and goalkeeper. One year after its foundation, the club began playing competitively during the 1925–26 season as part of the Belgrade Football Subassociation, an organization under the umbrella of the Yugoslav Football Association. The Serbian football committee was very well organized and was divided into three tiers. Obilić enjoyed early success and moved to the first tier by the 1928–29 season. They would stay amongst the top having finished second once and third three times. This continued until World War II which dramatically changed the structure of Yugoslav football. During World War II, the club played in the Serbian Football League, which usually consisted of ten clubs, and the competition ran from 1941 to 1944 under specific wartime circumstances. Obilić's placement in that league was usually 3rd, right behind the famous Belgrade clubs BSK and SK Jugoslavija. In the 1942 season they finished 7th; however, that season they acquired Valok, Zečević, Lojančić, Anđelković and Dimitrijević in the team, securing the 3rd place again in 1943.

=== SFR Yugoslavia (1945–92) ===
After World War II, the name Obilić was banned by the Communist Party of Yugoslavia which had just taken over Yugoslavia. Considering the name to be "too Serbian" because of Miloš Obilić, a legendary 14th-century knight much celebrated in Serbian epic poetry, the authorities forced the club into changing it. The new name became FK Čuburac after Čubura, the neighbourhood where the ground was located. The next big event in the club's history occurred in 1952, when FK Šumadija merged into FK Čuburac. Combined they restored the previous name "Obilić" after the government changed its mind and finally let them use the historic name.

The club rose higher in the ranks in small steps. Starting from 1952, Obilić played in the Belgrade Second Division. In the 1972–73 season, the club finally won the division and was promoted to the Belgrade First Division. They stayed in that division until the 1981–82 season, when Obilić placed fourth in the Belgrade Zone League and moved up to the Serbian Second League North. Proving their momentum, they won the league the following season and were promoted to the Serbian First League. After several years, in the 1987–88 season, Obilić earned the right to compete in the inter-republic league North of the Yugoslav Third League. This was a huge moment for the club, having finally left the small regional leagues for European quality football, now playing against teams from all over Yugoslavia. The club stayed in that third division until the Yugoslav Wars.

=== Rise (1992–96) ===
During the Yugoslav Wars, all phases of life were affected, including football. In 1992, as the Socialist Federal Republic of Yugoslavia fell apart, the Football Association of Yugoslavia had lost many clubs. Serbia and Montenegro remained united under the new Federal Republic of Yugoslavia and Obilić was placed for the 1992–93 season in the newly created Second National League. It took only three years for the club to reach the First National League Group B. Previously, Obilić reached the 1994–95 Yugoslav Cup final, eventually losing to Red Star Belgrade. In the 1995–96 First League debut season, they began to show their potential future top tier competitiveness.

=== Arkan years (1996–2000) ===
In June 1996, the career criminal and paramilitary leader Željko Ražnatović, known by his nom de guerre Arkan, took over Obilić and swiftly brought "victories." With him in charge, Obilić started a rise to the top of Yugoslav football, which cross-town powerhouses Red Star and Partizan had always monopolized. In the 1996–97 season, the club finished the First National league Group B as 1st, and advanced further for the first time to the First National league Group A (then the league was divided into two groups, A and B, each consisting of 10 clubs). In the 1997–98 season, led by coach Dragan Okuka, Obilić won the league and become the champions of Yugoslavia for the first time in one of the most remarkable seasons ever in Yugoslav football. In the same season, Obilić also made it to the 1997–98 Yugoslav Cup final, but lost to Partizan and barely missed the double. In the first qualifying round of the 1998–99 UEFA Champions League, Obilić defeated Icelandic club ÍBV by 4–1 on aggregate and played the second round against Germany's record champions Bayern Munich. In the first leg in Munich, Bayern won 4–0 and the return match ended 1–1, resulting in Obilić being eliminated by the eventual runners-up of the 1998–99 Champions League. In the domestic league, the club failed to defend its title, but became the runners-up of the 1998–99 season, and finished third the following season. During this period, upstart Obilić made an unbelievable run of 47 consecutive league matches without defeat (matchday 11 of the 1997–98 season until matchday 2 of the 1999–2000 season).

This feat came amid great controversy. According to journalist Franklin Foer, How Football Explains the World: An Unlikely Theory of Globalization, Ražnatović threatened players on opposing teams if they scored against Obilić. This threat was enforced by the many paramilitary veterans from his militia that filled their home ground, chanting threats, and pointing firearms at opposing players. Ražnatović's armed thugs even "escorted" referees to the matches. One player told the British football magazine FourFourTwo that he was locked in a garage when his team played Obilić. Obilić's ostensible "wins" from the era have not yet been vacated.

Over the summer 1998, UEFA considered prohibiting the club from European participation of the criminal connections of Obilić's president, Arkan. As a result, Arkan stepped down as president in favor of his wife Svetalana "Ceca" Ražnatović, in July 1998. Ceca held the role for a short time before ceding it to Žarko Nikolić, who held it for about a year, before Ceca reclaimed it in August 2000.

=== Vertiginous collapse (2000–2015) ===
Under Ceca's leadership, Obilić achieved third place in season 2000–01, and in the season 2001–02, they finished fourth. This was the last time that Obilić would be considered a top club in Yugoslavia. The next season, Obilić fell further and finished the season seventh. It marked their irrevocable decline. The club who achieved European club competitions began to sink slowly and continuously into indisputable ignominy. In the 2003–04 season, they were still considered "average" as managed sixth. In the 2004–05 season, Obilić fell outside the top ten for the first time since its arrival in the First League. Finally, Obilić was relegated to the Serbian First League after the season 2005–06. Obilić finished 15th, with only three wins the entire season. After just one year in the second division, Obilić has again been relegated to the Serbian League Belgrade in the 2006–07 season, ending its 15-year run at the national level.

With Arkan dead, Obilić fell on hard times. Its humiliation continued as it was relegated to amateur level for the 2007–08 season. For the 2008–09 season, Obilić finished last in the Belgrade Zone League and were relegated to the Belgrade First League. For the 2010–11 season, Obilić again finished last, in Belgrade First League, and were again relegated, to the Belgrade Second League. For the 2011–12 season, Obilić finished last yet again, and were again relegated, this time to the Belgrade Third League—7 divisions below Serbia's elite football league. The humiliation briefly paused, as Obilić finished champions in Group A of Belgrade Third League for the 2012–13 season, earning promotion to Second Belgrade League. Though Obilić was admitted to Belgrade First League for the 2013–14 season, it was again relegated to Belgrade Second League after collecting only 11 points in 26 matches.

=== Inactivity (2015–present) ===
Since 2015, Obilić no longer participates in any organized football competitions. The club still exists on paper and occasionally collects funds from renting out its stadium but the Obilić female team is the only one left in any official competitions.

== Stadium ==
The club's stadium is also named accordingly to venerate the Serbian knight it is called the Obilić Stadium with a capacity of about 4,550. The team was founded in 1924 and is recognized as one of the oldest active football clubs in Serbia.

== Trivia ==
When Miljan Miljanić stepped down from his presidential post at the Football Association of Yugoslavia in September 2001, the press jokingly cheered Svetlana Ražnatović's election for the post campaigning that she would have been the most beautiful president. However, former Crvena zvezda player Dragan Stojković, known lovingly by his nickname Piksi, was elected to the post.

== Honours and achievements ==
National Championships

- FR Yugoslavia First League:
  - Winners (1): 1997–98
  - Runners-up (1): 1998–99
- FR Yugoslavia First B League:
  - Winners (1): 1996-97
- Second Serbian League:
  - Winners (1): 1982-83
- Belgrade League:
  - Winners (1): 1972-73
- Third Belgrade League:
  - Winners (1): 2012-13

National Cups

- FR Yugoslavia Cup:
  - Runners-up (2): 1994–95, 1997–98
- Belgrade Cup:
  - Winners (4): 1962-63, 1985-86, 1986-87, 1990-91

== Obilić in Europe ==
Season	Competition	Round	Opposition	Score
1995–96	Cup Winners' Cup	Qualifying round	(Georgia (country)) Dinamo Batumi	0–1 (H), 2–2 (A)
1998–99	Champions League	First qualifying round	(Iceland) IBV	2–0 (H), 2–1 (A)
1998–99	Champions League	Second qualifying round	(Germany) Bayern Munich	0–4 (A), 1–1 (H)
1998–99	UEFA Cup	First round	(Spain) Atlético Madrid	0–2 (A), 0–1 (H)
2000–01	Intertoto Cup	First round	(Croatia) Cibalia	1–3 (A), 1–1 (H)
2001–02	UEFA Cup	Qualifying round	(Faroe Islands) Gøta	4–0 (H), 1–1 (A)
2001–02	UEFA Cup	First round	(Denmark) København	0–2 (A), 2–2 (H)
2002–03	Intertoto Cup	First round	(Finland) Haka	1–2 (H), 1–1 (A)

== Notable former players ==
This is a list of players with national team appearances:

- (Serbia) Milovan Milović
- (Serbia) (Serbia and Montenegro) Marko Pantelić
- (Serbia) (Serbia and Montenegro) Bojan Zajić
- (Serbia and Montenegro) Dražen Bolić
- (Serbia and Montenegro) Bojan Brnović
- (Serbia and Montenegro) Nenad Đorđević
- (Serbia and Montenegro) Nenad Grozdić
- (Serbia and Montenegro) Dragoslav Jevrić
- (Serbia and Montenegro) Saša Kovačević
- (Serbia and Montenegro) Nikola Lazetić
- (Serbia and Montenegro) Nenad Mladenović
- (Serbia and Montenegro) Milan Obradović
- (Serbia and Montenegro) Predrag Ocokoljić
- (Serbia and Montenegro) Aleksandar Pantić
- (Serbia and Montenegro) Radovan Radaković
- (Serbia and Montenegro) Zoran Ranković
- (Serbia and Montenegro) Predrag Ristović
- (Serbia and Montenegro) Dragan Šarac
- (Serbia and Montenegro) Miroslav Savić
- (Serbia and Montenegro) Saša Simonović
- (Serbia and Montenegro) Aleksandar Živković
- (Serbia and Montenegro) Bratislav Živković
- (Serbia and Montenegro) Saša Zorić
- (Socialist Federal Republic of Yugoslavia) Petar Krivokuća
- (Bosnia and Herzegovina) Vladan Grujić
- (Bosnia and Herzegovina) Stevo Nikolić
- (Bosnia and Herzegovina) Vule Trivunović
- (Montenegro) (Serbia and Montenegro) Dejan Ognjanović
- (Montenegro) Mirko Raičević
- (North Macedonia) Antonio Filevski

For the list of all former and current players with Wikipedia article, please see Category:FK Obilić players.
