= Serbia and Montenegro Cup =

- Founded: 1992
- Abolished: 2006
- Region: FR Yugoslavia /Serbia and Montenegro
- Teams: 46
- Last champions: Red Star
- Most championships: Red Star (9 titles)

The Serbia and Montenegro Cup was an association football knockout cup tournament of Serbia and Montenegro played between 1992 and 2006, after which Serbia and Montenegro became separate nations. The competition was the continuation of the old Marshal Tito Cup of the SFR Yugoslavia, and it was named FR Yugoslavia Cup between 1992 and 2003, when the official name of the country was Federal Republic of Yugoslavia. It was renamed to Serbia and Montenegro Cup in 2003 when the country changed its official name. The cup was organized by the Football Association of Serbia and Montenegro.

This tournament was played for a total of 15 seasons, the tournament was dominated by Serbian clubs with no Montenegrin sides ever reaching the final. Belgrade club Red Star were the most successful club, reaching the final in all but two seasons and winning the tournament nine times.

Between 1993 and 1998, the finals were played on a home and away basis, but this was later changed to a single-game final.

After Montenegro proclaimed its independence in 2006, both football associations got to work on organizing a new tournament. The Football Association of Serbia formed a deal with Carlsberg affiliate Lav pivo and quickly formed the Lav Kup Srbije. Football Association of Montenegro had much more trouble organizing their cup tournament as most of the organizers of the Serbia and Montenegro cup were in Serbia and they directly inherited the rights to the former association as well as cup tournament. However, after a long and difficult struggle, the Montenegrin Cup was formed.

== Finals ==
Season	Winner	Score	Runner-up	Venue(s)
Yugoslav Cup (Federal Republic of Yugoslavia)
1992–93	Red Star (13)	0 – 1; 1 – 0 (5 – 4 p)	Partizan	Partizan Stadium, Belgrade; Red Star Stadium, Belgrade
1993–94	Partizan (7)	3 – 2; 6 – 1	Spartak Subotica	City Stadium, Subotica; Partizan Stadium, Belgrade
1994–95	Red Star (14)	4 – 0; 0 – 0	Obilić	Obilić Stadium, Belgrade; Red Star Stadium, Belgrade
1995–96	Red Star (15)	3 – 0; 3 – 1	Partizan	Red Star Stadium, Belgrade; Partizan Stadium, Belgrade
1996–97	Red Star (16)	0 – 0; 1 – 0	Vojvodina	City Stadium, Novi Sad; Red Star Stadium, Belgrade
1997–98	Partizan (8)	0 – 0; 2 – 0	Obilić	Obilić Stadium, Belgrade; Partizan Stadium, Belgrade
1998–99	Red Star (17)	4 – 2	Partizan	Red Star Stadium, Belgrade
1999–00	Red Star (18)	4 – 0	Napredak Kruševac	Red Star Stadium, Belgrade
2000–01	Partizan (9)	1 – 0	Red Star	Red Star Stadium, Belgrade
2001–02	Red Star (19)	1 – 0	Sartid	Partizan Stadium, Belgrade
Serbia and Montenegro Cup
2002–03	Sartid (1)	1 – 0 (a.e.t.)	Red Star	Partizan Stadium, Belgrade
2003–04	Red Star (20)	1 – 0	Budućnost Banatski Dvor	Partizan Stadium, Belgrade
2004–05	Železnik (1)	1 – 0	Red Star	Partizan Stadium, Belgrade
2005–06	Red Star (21)	4 – 2 (a.e.t.)	OFK Beograd	Partizan Stadium, Belgrade

Note: In 2005 FK Železnik won the cup but after suffering financial problems the club merged with FK Voždovac and the trophy remains with the newly formed club. FK Sartid won the cup in 2003 and later changed its name back to FK Smederevo.

== Performance by club ==
Club	Winners	Runners-up	Winning years
Red Star	9	3	1993, 1995, 1996, 1997, 1999, 2000, 2002, 2004, 2006
Partizan	3	3	1994, 1998, 2001
Sartid	1	1	2003
Železnik	1	0	2005
Obilić	0	2	
Spartak Subotica	0	1	
Vojvodina	0	1	
Napredak Kruševac	0	1	
Budućnost Banatski Dvor	0	1	
OFK Beograd	0	1	

== See also ==
- Yugoslav Cup
- Serbian Cup
- Montenegrin Cup
