= 1994–95 Red Star Belgrade season =

Red Star Belgrade
1994–95 season
- Manager: Ljupko Petrović
- First League of FR Yugoslavia: 1st
- FR Yugoslavia Cup: Winners
- Top goalscorer: League: Darko Kovačević (24); All: Darko Kovačević, Nebojša Krupniković (28)

During the 1994–95 season, Red Star Belgrade participated in the 1994–95 First League of FR Yugoslavia and 1994–95 FR Yugoslavia Cup.

== Season summary ==
Red Star won their sixth double in this season.

On 12 November 1994, Red Star played a friendly match against Olympiacos.

Date	Opponent	Venue	Result	Scorers
12 November 1994	Olympiacos	H	4–1	Perović (2), Petković, Kovačević

Red Star were awarded a special trophy to commemorate their win in the 100th Eternal derby.

6 May 1995	Red Star Belgrade	2–1	Partizan	Red Star Stadium, Belgrade
	Kovačević 84' (pen.); Stojkovski 89'		Bjeković 76'	Attendance: 90,000; Referee: Branimir Babarogić

== Squad ==
Name	First League of FR Yugoslavia		FR Yugoslavia Cup		Total	
Name	Apps	Goals	Apps	Goals	Apps	Goals
Goalkeepers
(Federal Republic of Yugoslavia) Zvonko Milojević	31	0	8	0	39	0
(Federal Republic of Yugoslavia) Milan Simeunović	4	0	2	0	6	0
(Federal Republic of Yugoslavia) Rade Mojović	1	0	0	0	1	0
Defenders
(Federal Republic of Yugoslavia) Dejan Stefanović	30	9	8	0	38	9
(Federal Republic of Yugoslavia) Nenad Sakić	29	0	7	0	36	0
(Federal Republic of Yugoslavia) Goran Đorović	28	0	7	0	35	0
(North Macedonia) Mitko Stojkovski	28	1	6	0	34	1
(Federal Republic of Yugoslavia) Bratislav Živković	25	2	4	2	29	4
(Federal Republic of Yugoslavia) Predrag Stanković	13	2	4	1	17	3
(Federal Republic of Yugoslavia) Aleksandar Kristić	7	0	2	0	9	0
(Federal Republic of Yugoslavia) Vinko Marinović	2	0	1	0	3	0
Midfielders
(Federal Republic of Yugoslavia) Dejan Petković	36	8	8	2	44	10
(Federal Republic of Yugoslavia) Marko Perović	33	7	8	1	41	8
(Federal Republic of Yugoslavia) Ivan Adžić	33	6	8	1	41	7
(Federal Republic of Yugoslavia) Nebojša Krupniković	30	23	9	5	39	28
(Federal Republic of Yugoslavia) Nikola Radmanović	24	0	7	0	31	0
(Federal Republic of Yugoslavia) Jovan Stanković	13	0	6	0	19	0
(Federal Republic of Yugoslavia) Srđan Bajčetić	14	1	4	0	18	1
(Federal Republic of Yugoslavia) Dejan Stanković	7	0	1	0	8	0
(Federal Republic of Yugoslavia) Zoran Đorović	2	0	0	0	2	0
(Federal Republic of Yugoslavia) Darko Ljubojević	1	0	0	0	1	0
(Federal Republic of Yugoslavia) Žarko Dragaš	1	0	0	0	1	0
Forwards
(Federal Republic of Yugoslavia) Darko Kovačević	31	24	8	4	39	28
(Federal Republic of Yugoslavia) Goran Stojiljković	17	7	5	3	22	10
(Federal Republic of Yugoslavia) Darko Pivaljević	7	2	0	0	7	2
(Federal Republic of Yugoslavia) Zoran Mašić	6	4	0	0	6	4
(Federal Republic of Yugoslavia) Perica Ognjenović	3	0	1	0	4	0
Players sold or loaned out during the season
(Federal Republic of Yugoslavia) Miodrag Božović	1	0	1	0	2	0
(Federal Republic of Yugoslavia) Božidar Bandović	1	0	1	0	2	0
(Federal Republic of Yugoslavia) Zoran Riznić	7	2	2	0	9	2

== Results ==
=== First League of FR Yugoslavia ===
Fall IA league
Pos	Team	Pld	W	D	L	GF	GA	GD	Pts
1	Vojvodina	18	11	5	2	34	18	+16	27
2	Red Star	18	10	5	3	36	12	+24	25
3	Partizan	18	10	5	3	42	15	+27	25
4	Rad	18	6	7	5	16	16	0	19
5	Zemun	18	7	4	7	18	27	−9	18

Spring IA league
Pos	Team	Pld	W	D	L	GF	GA	GD	BP	Pts	Qualification or relegation
1	Red Star (C)	18	14	3	1	63	17	+46	11	42	Qualification for UEFA Cup preliminary round
2	Partizan	18	13	2	3	43	17	+26	10	38	
3	Vojvodina	18	10	4	4	37	26	+11	13	37	
4	Bečej	18	7	4	7	17	27	−10	8	26	Qualification for Intertoto Cup group stage
5	Zemun	18	6	5	7	24	25	−1	7	24	

(C) Champions

Date	Opponent	Venue	Result	Scorers
20 August 1994	OFK Beograd	A	1–2	Kovačević
27 August 1994	Zemun	A	2–0	Stefanović, Perović
3 September 1994	Vojvodina	H	2–2	Riznić, Krupniković
10 September 1994	Spartak Subotica	A	0–0	
17 September 1994	Rudar Pljevlja	H	3–1	Stojiljković, Stefanović, Riznić
24 September 1994	Partizan	A	1–1	Kovačević
1 October 1994	Radnički Niš	H	3–0	Kovačević (2), Perović
8 October 1994	Rad	A	0–0	
15 October 1994	Napredak Kruševac	H	4–0	Kovačević, Perović, Stojiljković (2)
22 October 1994	OFK Beograd	H	2–0	Perović, Adžić
29 October 1994	Zemun	H	5–0	Kovačević, Perović, Stojiljković (2), Petković
5 November 1994	Vojvodina	A	3–0	Krupniković (2), Kovačević
15 November 1994	Spartak Subotica	H	3–0	Pivaljević (2), Kovačević
19 November 1994	Rudar Pljevlja	A	1–1	Stefanović
26 November 1994	Partizan	H	3–2	Krupniković, P. Stanković, Petković
3 December 1994	Radnički Niš	A	0–1	
10 December 1994	Rad	H	0–1	
17 December 1994	Napredak Kruševac	A	3–1	Krupniković, P. Stanković, Stojiljković
11 February 1995	OFK Beograd	A	2–1	Krupniković (pen.), Stefanović
18 February 1995	Zemun	A	1–2	Kovačević
25 February 1995	Vojvodina	H	2–1	Živković, Petković
4 March 1995	Hajduk Kula	A	2–0	Petković, Kovačević
18 March 1995	Partizan	A	2–2	Krupniković, Adžić
22 March 1995	Radnički Beograd	H	4–0	Stefanović, Mašić (2), Krupniković
25 March 1995	Bečej	H	5–0	Kovačević (3), Petković, Krupniković
4 April 1995	Rad	A	3–1	Adžić, Vignjević (o.g.), Bajčetić
8 April 1995	Borac Čačak	H	6–0	Krupniković (3), Kovačević (2), Adžić
12 April 1995	OFK Beograd	H	5–0	Kovačević (3), Krupniković, Perović
15 April 1995	Zemun	H	3–1	Adžić, Stojiljković, Kovačević
22 April 1995	Vojvodina	A	2–2	Kovačević (2)
29 April 1995	Hajduk Kula	H	4–0	Krupniković (2), Stefanović, Petković
3 May 1995	Radnički Beograd	A	3–0	Stefanović, Adžić, Kovačević (pen.)
6 May 1995	Partizan	H	2–1	Kovačević (pen.), Stojkovski
13 May 1995	Bečej	A	2–2	Krupniković (2)
20 May 1995	Rad	H	8–1	Krupniković (3), Perović, Petković, Kovačević, Stefanović (2)
27 May 1995	Borac Čačak	A	7–3	Krupniković (3), Petković (pen.), Živković, Mašić (2)

=== FR Yugoslavia Cup ===
Date	Opponent	Venue	Result	Scorers
14 August 1994	Badnjevac	A	2–0	Kovačević, Petković (pen.)
20 September 1994	Radnički Niš	A	0–2	
5 October 1994	Radnički Niš	H	4–0	Kovačević (2), Stojiljković, Krupniković
26 October 1994	Partizan	H	2–0	Krupniković (2)
9 November 1994	Partizan	A	3–3	Perović, P. Stanković, Živković
21 February 1995	Bečej	H	2–1	Krupniković (pen.), Stojiljković
1 March 1995	Bečej	A	2–0	Petković, Kovačević
10 May 1995	Obilić	A	4–0	Krupniković, Živković, Adžić, Stojiljković
17 May 1995	Obilić	H	0–0	

== See also ==
- List of Red Star Belgrade seasons
