= Football Association of Serbia and Montenegro =

Governing body of association football in Serbia and Montenegro

UEFA
- Founded: 1992
- Folded: 2006
- Headquarters: Belgrade
- President: (none)

The Football Association of Serbia and Montenegro (Serbo-Croatian: Fudbalski savez Srbije i Crne Gore, FS SCG / Фудбалски савез Србије и Црне Горе, ФС СЦГ, lit. 'Football Alliance [of] Serbia and Montenegro') was the governing body of association football in Serbia and Montenegro, based in Belgrade. It organized the First League, the national team, the domestic cup as well as the Second Leagues of both republics.

== Etymology ==
The logo used between 1998 and 2003, when the team competed as the Federal Republic of Yugoslavia.

From 1992 to 2003 it was called the Football Association of Yugoslavia (Serbo-Croatian: Fudbalski Savez Jugoslavije [FSJ], lit. 'Football Alliance [of] Yugoslavia'), which was also the name of its predecessor FA.

== Career ==
The FSSCG replaced the Football Association of Yugoslavia, which was founded in 1919. It was run exactly the same way but the name changed in 2003. In 2006, Montenegro opted to declare independence thus breaking the union with Serbia. Both countries formed new football associations accordingly:

- Football Association of Serbia
- Football Association of Montenegro

Serbia inherited the former Yugoslavia and Serbia and Montenegro spot and records in UEFA and FIFA while Montenegro became the newest member to join the two organizations.

== Famous players ==
- Predrag Mijatović
- Savo Milošević
- Siniša Mihajlović
- Perica Ognjenović
- Dragan Stojković
- Branko Brnović
- Dejan Savićević
- Dejan Govedarica
- Dejan Stanković
- Vladimir Jugović
- Slaviša Jokanović
- Aleksandar Kocić
- Ljubinko Drulović
- Albert Nađ
- Goran Đorović
- Dragoje Leković
- Mateja Kežman
- Darko Kovačević
- Ivica Kralj
- Niša Saveljić
- Miroslav Đukić
- Dragoslav Jevrić
- Zoran Mirković
- Ognjen Koroman
- Milan Dudić
- Ilija Spasojević
- Nikola Žigić
- Danijel Ljuboja

== Achievements ==
- 1998 FIFA World Cup - Round of 16
- Euro 2000 - Quarterfinals

== See also ==
- Football Association of Yugoslavia
- Football Association of Serbia
- Football Association of Montenegro
