= Zoran Riznić =

Serbian footballer

Personal information
- Full name: Zoran Riznić
- Date of birth: 1 July 1967 (age 59)
- Place of birth: Šabac, SR Serbia, SFR Yugoslavia
- Position: Midfielder

Youth career
- c. 1979–1984: Red Star Belgrade

Senior career*
Years	Team	Apps	(Gls)
1986–1990	Mačva Šabac		
1990–1994	Rad	88	(22)
1994–1995	Red Star Belgrade	7	(2)
1995	→ Rad (loan)	8	(3)
1995–1998	OFI	65	(16)
1998–2000	AEL	37	(10)
- * Club domestic league appearances and goals

Zoran Riznić (Serbian Cyrillic: Зоран Ризнић; born 1 July 1967), also known by the nickname Rizna, is a Serbian former professional footballer who played as a midfielder.

Riznić began his career in the youth system of Red Star Belgrade before establishing himself with Mačva Šabac and later Rad. He returned to Red Star as a senior player in 1994 and was part of the side that won the league and cup double in 1994–95. He subsequently spent five seasons in Greece with OFI and AEL. During his first season at OFI he scored 12 league goals, while in 1996–97 he was part of the team which finished third in the Alpha Ethniki and qualified for the UEFA Cup.

== Club career ==
=== Early years and Mačva Šabac ===
Riznić was born in Šabac and spent part of his childhood in Belgrade. He later recalled that he joined the youth system of Red Star Belgrade at the age of 12 after being noticed by coach Gojko Zec. He remained with Red Star's youth sides until 1984, leaving at the age of 17. Among the coaches who worked with him there were Vladica Popović, Dragoslav Šekularac and Milovan Đorić.

After leaving Red Star, Riznić returned to the Šabac area and played local football. In early 1986, following a match in which his village side played against Mačva, he was recruited by Mačva Šabac. He quickly established himself in the first team and helped Mačva win promotion to the Yugoslav Second League in the 1986–87 season.

The following season, Riznić finished as the leading scorer in the eastern group of the 1987–88 Yugoslav Second League, scoring 17 goals.

=== Rad ===
In 1990, Riznić moved to Belgrade club Rad, where he spent four seasons. His performances attracted interest from Red Star, and Riznić later said that coach Milan Živadinović had wanted to bring him back to the club as early as 1992, but that Rad were unwilling to release him.

He remained with Rad until his contract expired in 1994, allowing him to join Red Star.

=== Red Star Belgrade ===
Riznić returned to Red Star Belgrade in 1994, this time as a senior player. According to Riznić, coach Ljupko Petrović was particularly keen on signing him. He agreed terms with club officials Dragan Džajić and Vladimir Cvetković and joined a squad which also included Dejan Petković, Darko Kovačević, Nebojša Krupniković and Ivan Adžić.

Riznić made seven league appearances and scored twice during the 1994–95 campaign. He also appeared in the Yugoslav Cup. Red Star went on to win both the First League of FR Yugoslavia and the FR Yugoslavia Cup, completing a domestic double.

One of the best-known episodes of Riznić's Red Star career occurred during an Eternal derby against Partizan in 1994. While the teams were warming up, Red Star supporters displayed a banner reading "Rizna, živeli!" ("Rizna, cheers!") accompanied by a drawing of a bottle. Riznić later said that he had not known about the banner beforehand and found it amusing.

Riznić has spoken openly in later interviews about his drinking during his playing career and its effect on his time at Red Star. In a 2013 interview, he said that he had never hidden the fact that he enjoyed drinking and identified beer as his usual drink. In a 2025 interview, he recalled that on one occasion he drank several beers after a morning training session and was unable to perform properly at training later that day. Petrović nevertheless kept him with the squad and attributed his condition to a back problem.

Riznić said that a later incident ultimately ended his place in Petrović's plans. After suffering an injury against his former club Rad, he was expected to attend treatment but instead went drinking and missed the session. Petrović subsequently told him that he could no longer rely on him. Riznić later accepted responsibility and said that the coach had been right. Although Džajić subsequently allowed him to return to training, Petrović maintained his decision.

Riznić later returned to Rad before continuing his career abroad.

=== OFI ===
In the summer of 1995, Riznić moved to Greece and signed for OFI in the Alpha Ethniki. In his first season he made 29 league appearances and scored 12 goals, placing him among the league's leading scorers.

In 1996–97, Riznić made 19 league appearances and scored twice. OFI finished third in the league with 66 points and qualified for the UEFA Cup.

He remained with OFI for the 1997–98 season, making another 17 league appearances and scoring twice. In total, he recorded 65 league appearances and 16 goals during his three seasons at the club.

Riznić later recalled his period in Crete positively. In a 2013 interview, he said that Dušan Bajević, then manager of Olympiacos, had followed his performances at OFI and proposed signing him after a strong display against Olympiacos. According to Riznić, the proposed transfer did not proceed after Olympiacos officials asked Bajević to guarantee his conduct away from the pitch and Bajević declined to do so.

=== AEL and retirement ===
Riznić left OFI in 1998 and joined AEL, where he spent two seasons. He made 37 league appearances and scored ten goals for the club.

After leaving AEL in 2000, Riznić returned to the Šabac area and continued playing for local lower-division clubs before ending his playing career.

== Personal life ==
Riznić is married and has three children. In a 2013 interview he named his wife as Danijela and said that they had two daughters and a son. His son, Branko Riznić, also became a professional footballer.

After his playing career, Riznić returned to live in Šabac. He has said that he did not pursue a coaching career despite being offered opportunities to become involved with Mačva.

== Career statistics ==
Club	Season	League	
Club	Season	Apps	Goals
OFI	1995–96	29	12
OFI	1996–97	19	2
OFI	1997–98	17	2
OFI	Total	65	16

== Honours ==
Red Star Belgrade

- First League of FR Yugoslavia: 1994–95
- FR Yugoslavia Cup: 1994–95

Individual

- Yugoslav Second League East group top scorer: 1987–88 (17 goals)
