= Zoran Mašić =

Serbian footballer (born 1969)

Personal information
- Date of birth: 2 January 1969 (age 57)
- Place of birth: Belgrade, Yugoslavia
- Height: 1.85 m (6 ft 1 in)
- Position: Forward

Youth career
- 1983–1987: Teleoptik

Senior career*
Years	Team	Apps	(Gls)
1988–1992	Teleoptik	70+	
1992–1994	OFK Beograd	50+	(27)
1994	→ Panionios (loan)	6	(1)
1995	Red Star Belgrade	12	(5)
1996	Mallorca	15	(2)
1996–1997	Écija Balompié	7	(0)
1998	Sichuan Guancheng	5+	(3)
1999	OFK Beograd		
1999–2000	Apollon Limassol	24	(13)
2000–2001	Ethnikos Achna	5+	
- * Club domestic league appearances and goals

Zoran Mašić (Serbian: Зоран Машић, Greek: Ζόραν Μάσιτς; born 02 January 1969) is a Serbian former footballer who played as a forward.

== Career ==
Zoran Mašić joined OFK Beograd in 1992 from FK Teleoptik, where he had spent four years in the first team after being first registered for the club back in 1983. Having previously passed through all youth academy selections from the youngest categories to the youth team, he captained FK Teleoptik that same year to their first-ever regional FR Yugoslavia Football Cup title in the club's history. Following this historic regional success, Teleoptik hosted Red Star Belgrade in the national Cup's round of 32 (šesnaestina finala), where they suffered a 0–5 defeat against the side that would go on to win the FR Yugoslavia Football Cup that season. Over the next two seasons, he was considered one of the best players in Serbia. In the 1992–93 season of the First League of FR Yugoslavia, he scored 13 goals, sharing 9th place on the top scorers list. He also scored four goals in the 1993–94 FR Yugoslavia Football Cup, helping OFK Beograd reach the quarter-finals.

In the following 1993–94 season, Mašić improved his league tally by scoring 14 goals for OFK Beograd. His impressive domestic performances earned him a call-up to the national team selection (the "A" team) chosen by head coach Ivan Čabrinović for the traditional match against the Journalists' Selection (Tim novinara). The match, organized by the Football Association of Yugoslavia (FSJ) and the Sports Journalists Association of Belgrade, took place on 16 November 1993 at the Red Star Stadium. Mašić was one of the few domestic league players selected by the national team coach to feature alongside established international stars.

=== 1993 Journalists vs Selectors Match squads ===
- Referee: Branimir Babarogić (Belgrade)
- Assistant Referees: Mirko Simić (Požarevac), Dušan Dukelić (Lazarevac)

Selectors' Team ("A" Team):

- Head Coach: Ivan Čabrinović
- Staff: Ljubiša Tumbaković (Coach), Dr. Bratislav Stojković (Doctor), Milan Aranđelović (Physiotherapist), Dragoslav Pivić (Secretary), Stanko Nikolić (Kit man)
- Squad: Goran Pandurović, Dragoje Leković, Miroslav Đukić, Slobodan Dubajić, Budimir Vujačić, Vladimir Jugović, Slaviša Jokanović, Siniša Mihajlović, Dragan Stojković, Predrag Mijatović, Dejan Savićević, Vladan Lukić, Branko Brnović, Gordan Petrić, Saša Ćurčić, Dejan Petković, Zoran Mašić, Slobodan Krčmarević.

Journalists' Team:

- Selection Committee: Vladan Stojaković, Jovan Sekulić, Radisav Gvozdenović
- Staff: Milan Živadinović (Coach), Dr. Milorad Erceg (Doctor), Zoran Rakić (Physiotherapist), Miša Bukumirović (Physiotherapist), Sreten Begovac (Secretary), Ljubomir Kosanović (Kit man)
- Squad: Aleksandar Kocić, Zvonko Milojević, Zoran Mirković, Nebojša Gudelj, Miodrag Božović, Goran Šaula, Niša Saveljić, Zoran Riznić, Srđan Bajčetić, Ilija Ivić, Anto Drobnjak, Darko Kovačević, Saša Simić, Goran Đorović, Mitko Stojkovski, Albert Nađ, Nenad Maslovar, Dejan Đurđević.

In January 1995, he joined Red Star Belgrade, after going on loan from OFK Beograd to Greek club Panionios in August 1994. After his return from loan, he scored four goals in six matches during the 1994–95 league season, helping Red Star win the domestic double by capturing both the First League of FR Yugoslavia title and the FR Yugoslavia Football Cup. He also made his European debut in the following season's UEFA Cup, coming on as a substitute for Perica Ognjenović in a 0–0 draw against Swiss side Neuchâtel Xamax.

In January 1996, he joined Spanish club Mallorca, where he scored two goals in 15 matches, before playing seven matches in the 1996–97 season for Écija Balompié. After a season in China with Sichuan Guancheng, he returned to OFK Beograd for a season before joining Cypriot side Apollon Limassol,

At Apollon Limassol, during matchday 20 of the 1999–2000 season, he scored two goals at home against APOEL, becoming only the third footballer to do so at the time, after Kostakis Vassiliadis and Giannakis Giangoudakis. In total, he scored 13 goals in 24 matches, finishing the season as the club's top goalscorer, before joining Ethnikos Achna on a free transfer.
