= Dejan Stanković =

Serbian football manager (born 1978)

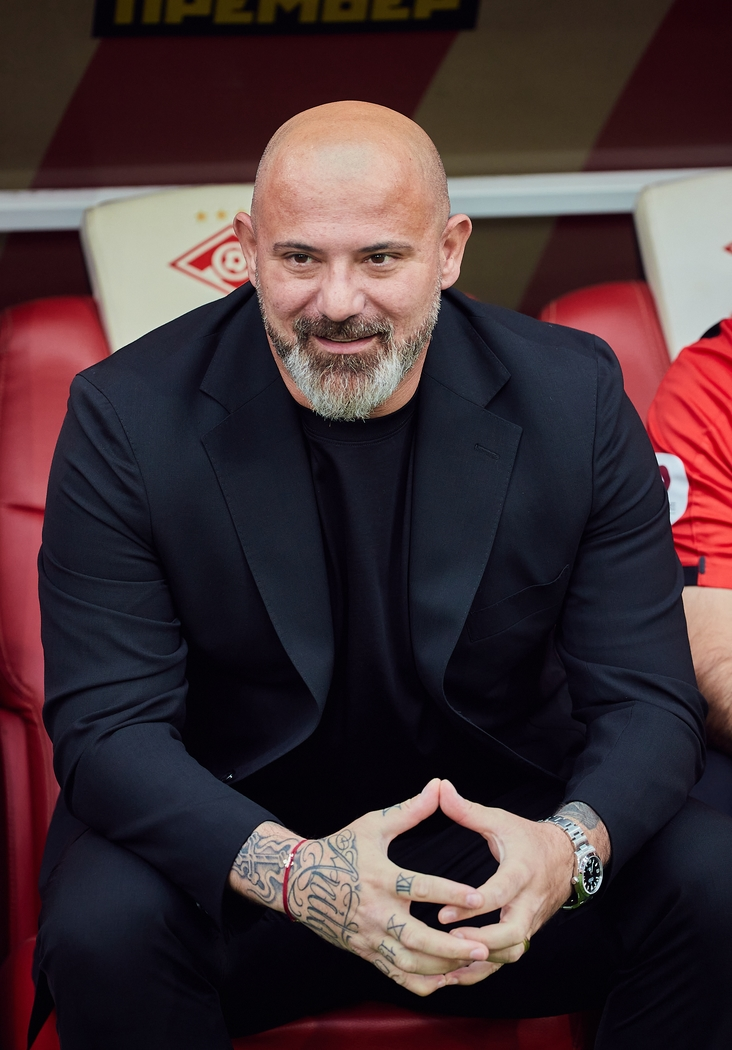
- Stanković with Spartak Moscow in 2025

Personal information
- Full name: Dejan Stanković
- Date of birth: 11 September 1978 (age 48)
- Place of birth: Belgrade, SR Serbia, Yugoslavia
- Height: 1.81 m (5 ft 11 in)
- Position: Midfielder

Youth career
- 1985–1992: Teleoptik
- 1992–1995: Red Star Belgrade

Senior career*
Years	Team	Apps	(Gls)
1995–1998	Red Star Belgrade	85	(29)
1998–2004	Lazio	137	(22)
2004–2013	Inter Milan	231	(29)
Total		453	(80)

International career
1998–2013	Serbia (Note: Including 61 caps and 12 goals for Serbia and Montenegro (known as FR Yugoslavia until 2003))	103	(15)

Managerial career
- 2019–2022: Red Star Belgrade
- 2022–2023: Sampdoria
- 2023–2024: Ferencváros
- 2024–2025: Spartak Moscow
- 2025–2026: Red Star Belgrade
- * Club domestic league appearances and goals

Dejan Stanković (Serbian Cyrillic: Дејан Станковић, Serbian pronunciation: [dějan stǎŋkoʋitɕ], born 11 September 1978) is a Serbian professional football manager and former player. He last served as the head coach of Serbian Super League club Red Star Belgrade. He captained the Serbia national team from 2007 until 2011, when he announced his retirement from international football.

Stanković began his career at Red Star Belgrade. He joined Lazio in 1998 and spent more than five years with the club before joining Inter Milan, where he remained until his retirement in 2013. Stanković is the only man to represent three differently named nations at FIFA World Cups – Yugoslavia, Serbia and Montenegro and Serbia.

== Club career ==
=== Red Star Belgrade ===
Stanković grew up in Zemun, a municipality of Belgrade. Both of his parents, Borislav and Dragica, have strong football backgrounds. Stanković began playing football for FK Teleoptik, based in his neighbourhood of Zemun. When spotted by Red Star cadet squad coach Branko Radović, however, 14-year-old Dejan transferred to Red Star Belgrade's youth system. Stanković then passed every age category at his hometown club. In the youth teams, he was coached by Vladimir Petrović, playing alongside future professionals Nikola Lazetić and Nenad Lalatović.

During the 1994–95 season, Stanković's debut opportunity for first-team action came under head coach Ljupko Petrović against crosstown rivals OFK Beograd on 11 February 1995, becoming the youngest player to debut with Red Star at senior level. Fighting for a spot on the team led by, among others, Rambo Petković, Darko Kovačević, and Nebojša Krupniković, 16-year-old Stanković made seven league appearances that season as the team won the league title. He scored his first goal against Budućnost Podgorica, becoming the youngest goalscorer in Red Star history as well as a first-team regular and a fan favourite.

During the early 1990s, Red Star was under an international ban because of a United Nations sanction imposed on FR Yugoslavia, meaning that the team could not compete in any European competition. The ban was lifted ahead of the 1995–96 season, and just a year later Stanković debuted in a European competition in two-leg victory over 1. FC Kaiserslautern in the Cup Winners' Cup.

Before the start of the 1997–98 season, he was made squad captain at the age of 19, the youngest ever in the club's history. Despite not winning the league, he captained the team to two domestic cup victories.

=== Lazio ===
In summer 1998, Stanković transferred for ₤24 million to Lazio, where he scored on his Serie A debut versus Piacenza on 13 September 1998. In those years, Lazio had an all-star squad with world-class players at almost every position, but Stanković quickly secured a regular first-team place despite competition from Pavel Nedvěd, Juan Sebastián Verón and Roberto Mancini. He formed a formidable midfield combination with Argentinian Verón and Diego Simeone and were an integral part of the successful Lazio side at the turn of the decade. His work rate and impressive performances earned him the nickname "Il Dragone" ("The Dragon"). He had five-and-a-half successful seasons in the Biancoceleste part of Rome – winning 1999–2000 Serie A, 1999–2000 Coppa Italia, 1998 and 2000 Supercoppa Italiana, 1998–99 UEFA Cup Winners' Cup and 1999 UEFA Super Cup – before earning a high-profile move to Inter Milan in February 2004.

=== Inter Milan ===
==== 2004–2008 ====
Although Lazio had suffered from financial issues since 2001 and had been forced to sell some of its best players, Stanković began the 2003–04 season at Lazio. In January 2004, Juventus were favorites in the chase for the Serb's signature, with even some preliminary paperwork reportedly signed between the two parties in early January 2004, but the player eventually chose Inter. He was signed as part of a deal worth €4 million, that also sent Macedonian international Goran Pandev in the opposite direction.

In early February 2004, Stanković played his debut for Inter under head coach Alberto Zaccheroni, a Serie A clash at home against Siena that ended 4–0. On 21 February 2004, he scored a spectacular goal directly from a corner kick to put Inter 1–0 up in the Derby della Madonnina versus fierce rivals Milan. Inter finished the league season in fourth place, thus qualifying for Champions League. Still, Inter president Massimo Moratti was not convinced with Zaccheroni, who quit at the end of the season because of a feeling of distrust; Mancini was then brought in by Moratti from the financial shipwreck at Lazio. In summer 2004, Stanković reunited with another familiar face from Lazio: Siniša Mihajlović.

On 7 May 2006, Stanković played his 100th match for Inter. Coming off the summer appearance at the 2006 World Cup, he carried excellent form right from the start of the 2006–07 Serie A campaign, scoring some decisive goals. His double against Catania and his memorable goal against city rivals Milan only further enhanced his central role in a team that will win the league in a record-breaking season. He renewed his contract on 2 February 2007, with Inter securing his services until at least 2010.

==== 2008–09 season ====
With the appointment of José Mourinho to replace Mancini as Inter's head coach in June 2008, there was much press speculation about Stanković's exit from the Nerazzuri – along with Adriano, David Suazo and Nicolás Burdisso – being imminent, due to reportedly not being held in high regard by the newly-arrived Portuguese coach as well as the strong connection the Serbian midfielder had with the previous coach. Then in late June, after reports that Stanković was told by Mourinho that he would not be allowed to show up for the pre-season training in South Tyrol, and more reports on the interest of Juventus, it seemed that Stanković was definitely on his way out. The press reports of Stanković's pending arrival to Juventus, sparked the club's fans into protests and online petitions, as they would neither forgive his turning down the club back in January 2004, nor his exuberant public celebrations after the 2005–06 Serie A title that was stripped from Juventus and handed to Inter following the Calciopoli scandal. The Juve deal fell through within days for a variety of other reasons, and Stanković was suddenly reported to be happy to stay at Inter. However, the transfer talk was temporarily reignited again by Mourinho's suggestion in mid-July 2008 that "Stanković was not the same player that he was at Lazio".

Stanković, however, remained with the club to fight for a spot on Mourinho's team. On 19 October 2008, Stanković scored a superb goal in Inter's 4–0 hammering of Luciano Spalletti's Roma away at the Stadio Olimpico. After receiving a pass from Sulley Muntari, he drove the ball past the Roma goalkeeper into the net, his 24th goal in all competitions for the Nerazzuri, thus ending a year-long goal drought. In the interviews after the match, Stanković talked of his joy to be fully back on form following the injury-prone previous season, also thanking Mourinho for giving him an opportunity, even after the two did not get off on the right foot during the summer pre-season. In December 2008, Stanković, by now an irreplaceable part of Mourinho's midfield, gave another display of his rediscovered form versus Chievo at home: first with a through-pass to Maxwell for the game's opening goal, followed by a goal of his own for 2–0 with a first time shot from the edge of the penalty area, and finally an assist from the right wing to Zlatan Ibrahimović as Inter recorded a 4–2 victory.

On 7 February 2009, Stanković celebrated his 200th appearance for Inter in all competitions at the away game versus Lecce. Inter hammered the newly promoted team 3–0, with Stanković heading in the third goal, following a slick free-kick cross from Maicon. Stanković's season-long good form continued, as he scored Inter's second goal against Milan in the 270th Milan Derby on 15 February. This turned out to be the winning goal, after Alexandre Pato had pulled one back. Inter went on to win a fourth consecutive title.

In the Champions League, Inter limped into the second round, after losing their final two group stage matches against Panathinaikos and Werder Bremen. In the first elimination round (round of 16), they lost to Manchester United in a hard-fought tie. Stanković played the full 90 minutes in the first leg at San Siro, putting in a very active display. In the return at Old Trafford, Stanković started the match and had a lively first half, with two missed opportunities to score. In the 58th minute, with United leading 2–0, and Inter forced to chase the result, Mourinho took Stanković off and inserted striker Adriano.

==== 2009–10: Triplete season ====
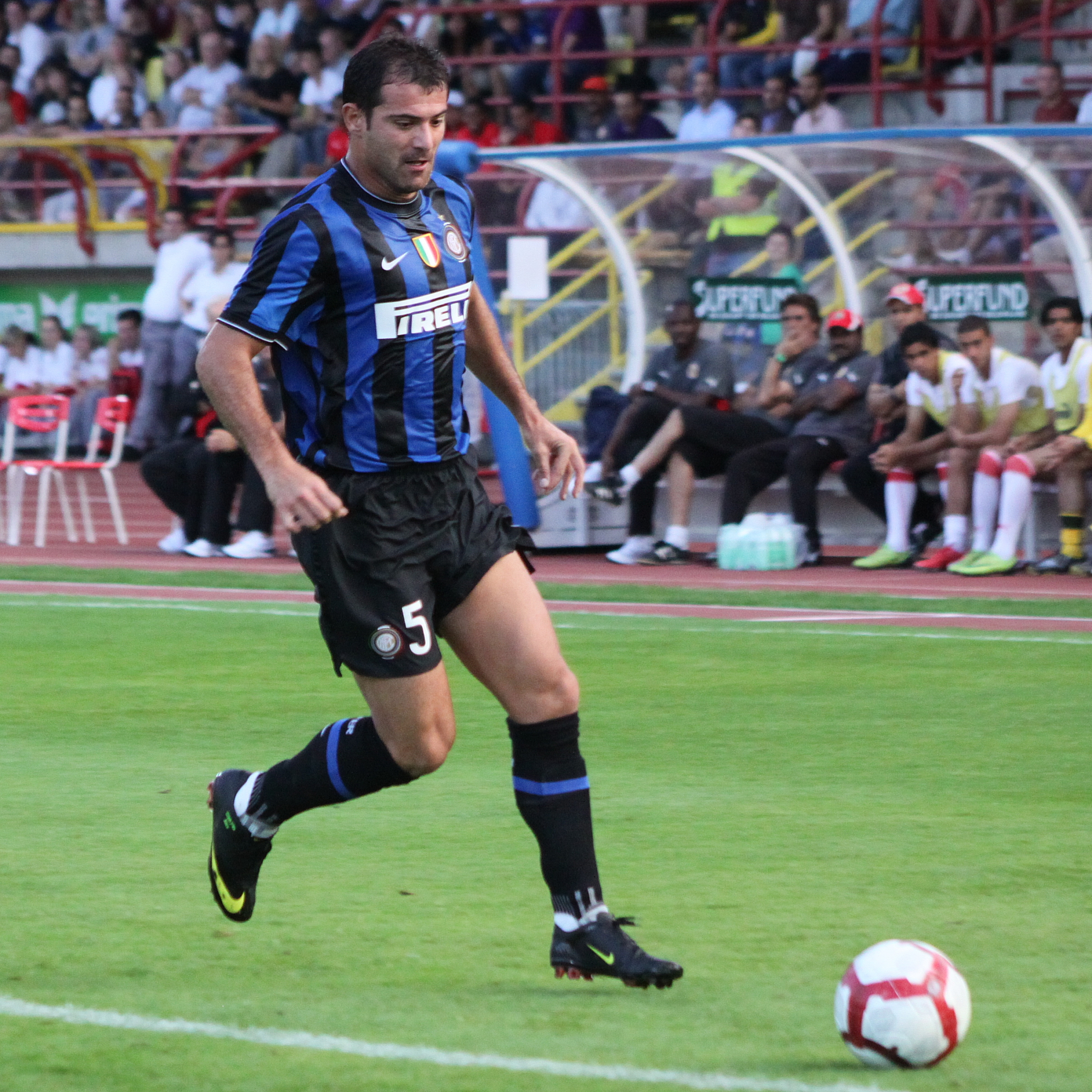
Stanković in action for Inter in 2009

The 2009–10 season began well for Stanković. In the Milan derby on 29 August, he played in a deeper role to replace the injured Esteban Cambiasso. Nevertheless, he scored Inter's fourth goal and his second in consecutive Milan derbies in a 4–0 thrashing, a spectacular 30-yard strike after quickly collecting Sulley Muntari's pass. He subsequently scored against Rubin Kazan and Udinese to continue his rich vein of form under José Mourinho.

He also scored a wonder goal from 54 metres out in a 5–0 thrashing against Genoa, volleying the ball straight in from Marco Amelia's clearance. At the end of the season, Stanković won an historical treble with Inter, conquering the 2009–10 Serie A, Coppa Italia and Champions League.

==== 2010–11 season ====
Playing under new head coach Rafael Benítez, Stanković continued his usual midfield role. On 28 November 2010, Stanković netted a hat-trick in an emphatic 5–2 victory against Parma at the San Siro.

At the 2010 FIFA Club World Cup in Abu Dhabi in mid-December, Stanković played an excellent semi-final against Seongnam, scoring the opening goal and performing well. However, Benítez decided to bench him for the final against TP Mazembe, only bringing him on for Christian Chivu in the 54th minute. Benítez was soon sacked despite winning the trophy, and a couple of weeks later, Stanković expressed his dismay at Spaniard's decision to leave him on the bench for the final. On the same occasion, despite publicly backing the beleaguered coach months earlier, Stanković stated that Benítez simply "didn't work" at Inter.

Under newly-arrived head coach Leonardo, Stanković continued his role in midfield. Stanković scored his first goal under the new coach at home versus Bologna in mid-January, and then continued with the same form away at Udinese, scoring the opening goal in a match that Inter lost 3–1. In Coppa Italia quarter-final at Napoli on 26 January, Stanković injured his thigh muscle. He returned for a Serie A match at Sampdoria on 27 February, as Inter won 2–0. Inter made good recovery chasing the league-leaders Milan, getting within two points of them ahead of Milan derby, but lost disastrously 0–3.

Stanković scored a spectacular volley from the halfway line against Schalke 04 in the Champions League quarter-final first leg on 5 April 2011, as goalkeeper Manuel Neuer ran out of the box to make a daring header clearance that made it up to the halfway line, leaving an open goal as a target for Stanković's firm first-time volley. However, Inter lost that match 2–5 at home. On 19 April, in the Coppa Italia semi-final first leg, Stanković scored the winning goal with another spectacular long-range effort, hitting a sweet outside foot volley past the despairing dive of the goalkeeper. Stanković played the full 90 in the 2011 Coppa Italia Final, winning his last trophy with Inter.

==== Retirement ====
Stanković played two additional seasons at Inter without reaching the same heights. On 6 July 2013, he announced his goodbye to Inter fans via a letter published on the club's official website. He made a total of 326 appearances with Inter, scoring 42 goals. In 2019, he was inducted into Inter Milan Hall of Fame.

== International career ==
=== Pre-split Serbia ===
Stanković made his international debut for the FR Yugoslavia team against South Korea on 22 April 1998, scoring two goals in a 6–1 victory. He represented the FR Yugoslavia national team at the 1998 World Cup and Euro 2000, soon establishing himself as an important player.

The Yugoslav team was renamed Serbia and Montenegro by the time 2006 World Cup qualifying started. Stanković played all games but last one, scoring two goals. At the 2006 FIFA World Cup, he was given the number 10 shirt and Savo Milošević captained the new Serbia and Montenegro team in their first World Cup, but they failed to progress to the knock-out rounds after losing all their group matches to the Ivory Coast, Argentina and the Netherlands. After Milošević retired, the midfielder took over as captain of the reformed Serbia national team, following the breakup of Serbia and Montenegro.

Stanković was a silver medalist at the 2009 Cyprus International Football Tournament. In the 2010 World Cup qualifying, Stanković started in and captained all except two of Serbia's matches. They qualified for their first World Cup as an independent nation.

=== Serbia ===
In June 2010, Stanković was selected in Serbia's squad for the 2010 FIFA World Cup, where he played every minute in group stage. Their second match was a shocking 1–0 victory against Germany, but they failed to progress to the next round due to narrow losses against Ghana and Australia.

After captaining the team in a 1–0 loss in the final match of the UEFA Euro 2012 qualifying phase against Slovenia, Stanković announced his retirement from international football after 13 years since his debut against South Korea in 1998. He played a testimonial match two years later, becoming the most capped player in the history of Serbia (103), playing one more match than Savo Milošević. The match was played against Japan, in which he played until the tenth minute, making room for Ivan Radovanović. He received a standing ovation as he said his final goodbye to football. Serbia went on to win the match 2–0.

== Style of play ==
A former defender, Stanković usually played as an attacking midfielder; however, he was a versatile player who was capable of operating in many different positions, making a name for himself as a player who could also play out wide on the wings or track back in a defensive midfield role. He was also capable of playing in the centre of the pitch in a box-to-box role. "Deki" – as he is nicknamed– was best-known for his efficient, accurate passing, versatility and creativity, as well as his ability to score goals, in particular from long distance, courtesy of his striking ability with his right foot. he was also effective in the air, and was capable making late runs into the box. He was also known for his pace, skill, and influence on the pitch, as well as his composure. In his prime, he was considered to be one of the best players in European football. Despite his ability, however, he was occasionally criticised in the media for being inconsistent.

== Managerial career ==
=== Red Star Belgrade ===
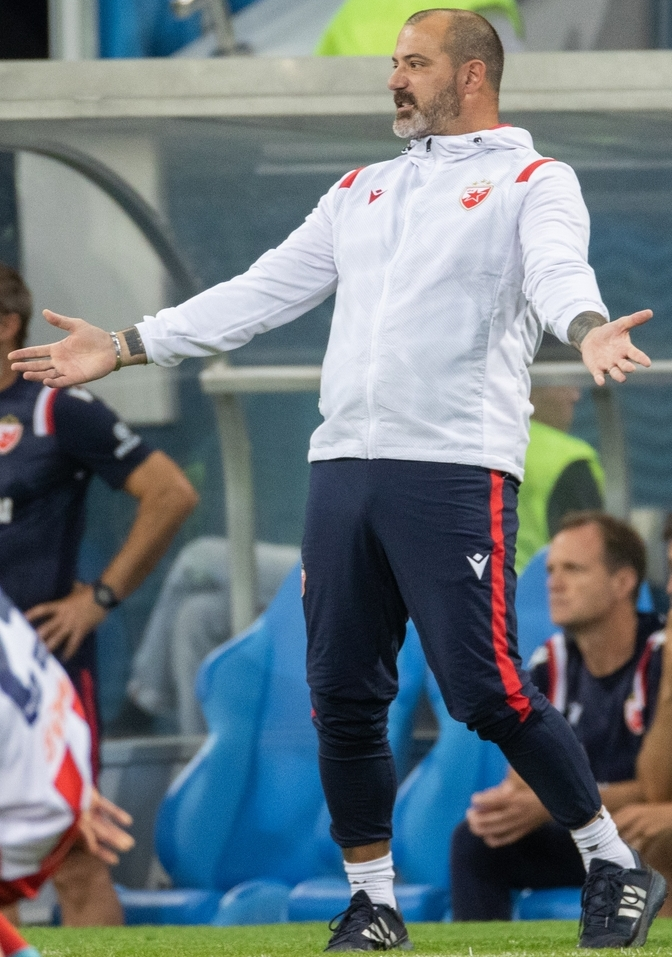
Stanković with Red Star Belgrade in 2022

On 21 December 2019, Stanković was appointed as the manager of Serbian SuperLiga club Red Star Belgrade on a two-and-a-half-year contract. The club won the 2019–20 Serbian SuperLiga, Stankovic's first trophy as a manager, 14 points clear of city rivals Partizan.

In 2020–21, Red Star Belgrade went unbeaten through the whole league season, winning 35 of 38 fixtures, while scoring a record-breaking 114 goals. On 25 May, the club also won the Serbian Cup through a 4–3 win on penalties (0–0 after full time) against Partizan in the final. Together with Hoffenheim, they advanced through the group stage of the 2020–21 UEFA Europa League, eliminating Slovan Liberec and Gent in the process. The club was knocked out in the round of 32 by Italian club Milan on away goals after the tie ended 3–3 on aggregate.

On 26 August 2022, Stanković resigned as Red Star manager after being eliminated by Maccabi Haifa in the 2022–23 UEFA Champions League qualification playoff round.

=== Sampdoria ===
On 6 October 2022, Stanković signed a contract until the end of the season with struggling Serie A club Sampdoria. He left Sampdoria by the end of season, after failing to save the team from relegation in a situation aggravated by financial struggles.

=== Ferencváros ===
On 4 September 2023, he was appointed as the coach of Nemzeti Bajnokság I club Ferencvárosi TC. On 14 December 2023, Ferencváros drew with ACF Fiorentina at the Groupama Arena on the last match day of the 2023–24 UEFA Europa Conference League group stage. Ferencváros finished in the second place and qualified for the knockout stage.

In an interview with La Gazzetta dello Sport, it was a big achievement to draw twice with ACF Fiorentina and being the coach of Ferencváros teaches him to handle stress as a football manager.

On 15 May 2024, Ferencváros were defeated by Paks 2–0 in the 2024 Magyar Kupa Final at the Puskás Aréna. On 16 May 2024, he resigned from his position.

=== Spartak Moscow ===
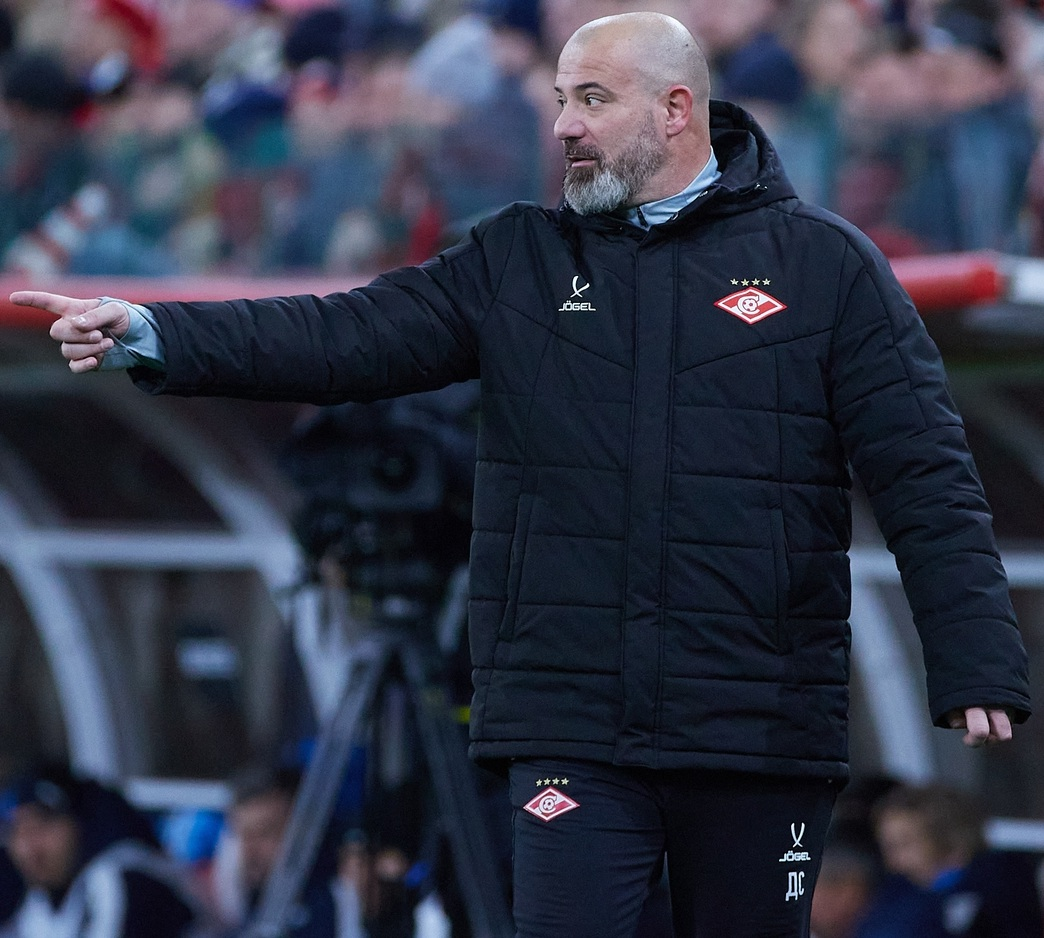
Stanković managing Spartak Moscow in 2025

On 16 May 2024, Russian Premier League club Spartak Moscow announced they signed a two-year contract with Stanković, beginning in the 2024–25 season, he would not be coaching the remaining 2023–24 games. On 11 November 2025, Stanković left Spartak by mutual consent, with the club in 6th place.

=== Return to Red Star Belgrade ===
On 21 December 2025, Stanković returned for a second spell as head coach of Red Star Belgrade. He led the team to the domestic double in the 2025–26 season. On 11 August 2026, Stanković left his position following a 2–0 home defeat to Hapoel Be'er Sheva in the Champions League third qualifying round, which resulted in the club's elimination from the competition.

== Personal life ==
Stanković was born in Belgrade, present day Serbia, to Borislav and Dragica and has a brother Siniša. He was married to Ana Ačimovič, whom he met at the age of 19, and who is a sister of former professional footballer Milenko Ačimovič, Stanković's former teammate at Red Star. The pair has three sons; Stefan (b. 2000), Filip (b. 2002) and Aleksandar (b. 2005). All of his three sons were members of Inter Milan football academy.

Stanković is married to Slovene journalist Anita Bojanić. On 19 January 2025, their daughter Anđela was born.

== Career statistics ==
=== Club ===
Appearances and goals by club, season and competition
Club	Season	League			Cup		Europe		Other (Note: Includes Supercoppa Italiana, UEFA Super Cup, and FIFA Club World Cup)		Total	
Club	Season	Division	Apps	Goals	Apps	Goals	Apps	Goals	Apps	Goals	Apps	Goals
Red Star Belgrade	1994–95	First League of FR Yugoslavia	7	0	0	0	0	0	0	0	7	0
Red Star Belgrade	1995–96	First League of FR Yugoslavia	24	4	4	1	2	0	0	0	30	5
Red Star Belgrade	1996–97	First League of FR Yugoslavia	26	10	6	1	5	2	0	0	37	13
Red Star Belgrade	1997–98	First League of FR Yugoslavia	28	15	7	3	4	3	0	0	39	21
Red Star Belgrade	Total		85	29	17	5	11	5	0	0	113	39
Lazio	1998–99	Serie A	29	4	5	1	7	4	1	0	42	9
Lazio	1999–2000	Serie A	16	3	4	0	11	2	1	0	32	5
Lazio	2000–01	Serie A	21	0	2	1	9	0	1	0	33	1
Lazio	2001–02	Serie A	27	7	4	0	5	1	0	0	36	8
Lazio	2002–03	Serie A	29	6	2	0	7	0	0	0	38	6
Lazio	2003–04	Serie A	15	2	4	2	8	0	0	0	27	4
Lazio	Total		137	22	21	4	47	7	3	0	208	33
Inter Milan	2003–04	Serie A	14	4	2	0	0	0	0	0	16	4
Inter Milan	2004–05	Serie A	31	3	6	0	10	3	0	0	47	6
Inter Milan	2005–06	Serie A	23	2	7	2	8	2	0	0	38	6
Inter Milan	2006–07	Serie A	34	6	3	0	7	0	1	0	45	6
Inter Milan	2007–08	Serie A	21	1	3	0	6	0	1	0	31	1
Inter Milan	2008–09	Serie A	31	5	1	0	5	0	1	0	38	5
Inter Milan	2009–10	Serie A	29	3	1	0	12	2	1	0	43	5
Inter Milan	2010–11	Serie A	26	5	3	1	7	2	4	1	40	9
Inter Milan	2011–12	Serie A	19	0	0	0	5	0	1	0	25	0
Inter Milan	2012–13	Serie A	3	0	0	0	0	0	0	0	3	0
Inter Milan	Total		231	29	26	3	60	9	9	1	326	42
Career total			453	80	64	12	118	21	12	1	647	114

=== International ===
As of match played 13 October 2013

Appearances and goals by national team and year
National team	Year	Apps	Goals
FR Yugoslavia / Serbia	1998	10	3
FR Yugoslavia / Serbia	1999	7	3
FR Yugoslavia / Serbia	2000	8	0
FR Yugoslavia / Serbia	2001	6	2
FR Yugoslavia / Serbia	2002	8	0
FR Yugoslavia / Serbia	2003	4	1
FR Yugoslavia / Serbia	2004	6	2
FR Yugoslavia / Serbia	2005	7	0
FR Yugoslavia / Serbia	2006	11	2
FR Yugoslavia / Serbia	2007	5	0
FR Yugoslavia / Serbia	2008	6	0
FR Yugoslavia / Serbia	2009	7	0
FR Yugoslavia / Serbia	2010	10	2
FR Yugoslavia / Serbia	2011	7	0
FR Yugoslavia / Serbia	2012	0	0
FR Yugoslavia / Serbia	2013	1	0
Total		103	15

Scores and results list FR Yugoslavia/Serbia's goal tally first, score column indicates score after each Stanković goal.

List of international goals scored by Dejan Stanković
No.	Date	Venue	Opponent	Score	Result	Competition	Ref.
FR Yugoslavia goals
1	22 April 1998	Stadion Crvena Zvezda, Belgrade, FR Yugoslavia	South Korea	1–1	3–1	Friendly	
2	22 April 1998	Stadion Crvena Zvezda, Belgrade, FR Yugoslavia	South Korea	2–1	3–1	Friendly	
3	2 September 1998	Čair Stadium, Niš, FR Yugoslavia	Switzerland	1–0	1–1	Friendly	
4	1 September 1999	Lansdowne Road, Dublin, Republic of Ireland	Republic of Ireland	1–1	1–2	UEFA Euro 2000 qualifying	
5	8 September 1999	Philip II Arena, Skopje, Macedonia	Macedonia	3–0	4–2	UEFA Euro 2000 qualifying	
6	9 October 1999	Stadion Maksimir, Zagreb, Croatia	Croatia	2–1	2–2	UEFA Euro 2000 qualifying	
7	6 June 2001	Svangaskarð, Toftir, Faroe Islands	Faroe Islands	1–0	6–0	2002 FIFA World Cup qualification	
8	6 June 2001	Svangaskarð, Toftir, Faroe Islands	Faroe Islands	3–0	6–0	2002 FIFA World Cup qualification	
Serbia and Montenegro goals
9	16 November 2003	Kazimierz Górski Stadium, Płock, Poland	Poland	1–2	3–4	Friendly	
10	13 October 2004	Stadion Crvena Zvezda, Belgrade, Serbia and Montenegro	San Marino	2–0	5–0	2006 FIFA World Cup qualification	
11	13 October 2004	Stadion Crvena Zvezda, Belgrade, Serbia and Montenegro	San Marino	3–0	5–0	2006 FIFA World Cup qualification	
12	27 May 2006	Stadion Crvena Zvezda, Belgrade, Serbia and Montenegro	Uruguay	1–0	1–1	Friendly	
Serbia goals
13	11 October 2006	Stadion Crvena Zvezda, Belgrade, Serbia	Armenia	1–0	3–0	UEFA Euro 2008 qualifying	
14	5 June 2010	Stadion Partizana, Belgrade, Serbia	Cameroon	2–2	4–3	Friendly	
15	3 September 2010	Tórsvøllur, Tórshavn, Faroe Islands	Faroe Islands	2–0	3–0	UEFA Euro 2012 qualifying	

== Managerial statistics ==
As of match played 11 August 2026

Managerial record by team and tenure
Team	Nat	From	To	Record								Ref.
Team	Nat	From	To	G	W	D	L	GF	GA	GD	Win %	Ref.
Red Star Belgrade	(Serbia)	21 December 2019	26 August 2022	134	108	17	9	334	79	+255	80.60	
Sampdoria	(Italy)	6 October 2022	6 June 2023	32	4	8	20	22	58	−36	12.50	
Ferencváros	(Hungary)	5 September 2023	30 June 2024	50	33	10	7	108	37	+71	66.00	
Spartak Moscow	(Russia)	1 July 2024	11 November 2025	64	37	11	16	120	64	+56	57.81	
Red Star Belgrade	(Serbia)	21 December 2025	11 August 2026	32	24	3	5	75	24	+51	75.00	
Total				310	206	47	57	655	260	+395	66.45	

== Honours ==
=== Player ===
Red Star Belgrade

- Yugoslav First League: 1994–95
- Yugoslav Cup: 1994–95, 1995–96, 1996–97

Lazio

- Serie A: 1999–2000
- Coppa Italia: 1999–2000
- Supercoppa Italiana: 1998, 2000
- UEFA Cup Winners' Cup: 1998–99
- UEFA Super Cup: 1999

Inter Milan

- Serie A: 2005–06, 2006–07, 2007–08, 2008–09, 2009–10
- Coppa Italia: 2004–05, 2005–06, 2009–10, 2010–11
- Supercoppa Italiana: 2005, 2006, 2008, 2010
- UEFA Champions League: 2009–10
- FIFA Club World Cup: 2010

=== Individual ===
- ESM Team of the Season: 2006–07
- Serbian Player of the Year: 2006, 2010
- ADN Eastern European Footballer of the Season: 2010
- Inter Milan Hall of Fame: 2019

=== Manager ===
Red Star Belgrade

- Serbian SuperLiga: 2019–20, 2020–21, 2021–22, 2025–26
- Serbian Cup: 2020–21, 2021–22, 2025–26

Ferencváros

- Nemzeti Bajnokság I: 2023–24

Individual

- Nemzeti Bajnokság I Manager of the Month: October 2023
- Russian Premier League Manager of the Month: November/December 2024.

== See also ==
- List of footballers with 100 or more caps

Sporting positions
Preceded by Savo Milošević	Serbia captain 2006–2011	Succeeded by Nikola Žigić
