= Aleksandar Kristić =

Serbian football manager and player

Personal information
- Date of birth: 5 October 1970 (age 56)
- Place of birth: Valjevo, SR Serbia, SFR Yugoslavia
- Height: 1.86 m (6 ft 1 in)
- Position: Defender

Youth career
- Krušik Valjevo
- Red Star Belgrade

Senior career*
Years	Team	Apps	(Gls)
1990–1995	Red Star Belgrade	52	(0)
1991	→ Bor (loan)	16	(0)
1991	→ Mačva Šabac (loan)		
1995	Degerfors IF	7	(0)
1996	OFK Beograd	6	(2)
1996–1997	Zemun	21	(1)
1997–1998	Red Star Belgrade	15	(1)
1998–2000	Salernitana	2	(1)
Total		119	(5)

International career
1998	FR Yugoslavia	1	(0)

Managerial career
- 2004–2006: OFK Beograd (youth)
- 2008: Hajduk Beograd
- 2008–2010: Red Star Belgrade (assistant)
- 2010: Red Star Belgrade
- 2011–2012: Napredak Kruševac
- 2012–2013: Baku (assistant)
- 2014: Buriram United (assistant)
- 2015–2016: Beijing Enterprises (assistant)
- 2018–2019: Qingdao Jonoon
- 2023: Jedinstvo Ub
- * Club domestic league appearances and goals

Aleksandar Kristić (Serbian Cyrillic: Александар Кристић; born 5 October 1970) is a Serbian football manager and former player.

== Club career ==
After starting out at Krušik Valjevo, Kristić joined the youth system of Red Star Belgrade. He spent some time on loan to Bor and Mačva Šabac, before returning to Red Star in the second half of the 1991–92 season.

In the summer of 1998, Kristić was transferred to Serie A side Salernitana. He made his league debut for the club in a 4–0 home victory over Bologna on 25 April 1999, scoring the final goal of the match deep into injury time, less than 30 seconds after coming off the bench.

== International career ==
At international level, Kristić was capped once for FR Yugoslavia, playing the full 90 minutes in a 3–1 away friendly loss to Argentina on 25 February 1998.

== Managerial career ==
In June 2008, Kristić returned to Red Star Belgrade as assistant manager to Zdeněk Zeman. He would serve as an assistant under several managers over the next two years, before replacing Ratko Dostanić as manager in August 2010. In December 2010, Kristić left his position as manager of Red Star by mutual consent after a meeting with the board members.

In December 2011, it was reported that Kristić would be taking charge of Serbian First League side Napredak Kruševac.

On 14 June 2018, Kristić was appointed as manager of China League Two club Qingdao Jonoon.

== Honours ==
Red Star Belgrade

- Yugoslav First League: 1991–92
- First League of FR Yugoslavia: 1994–95
- FR Yugoslavia Cup: 1992–93, 1994–95
