= Srboljub Nikolić =

Serbian footballer (1965–2022)

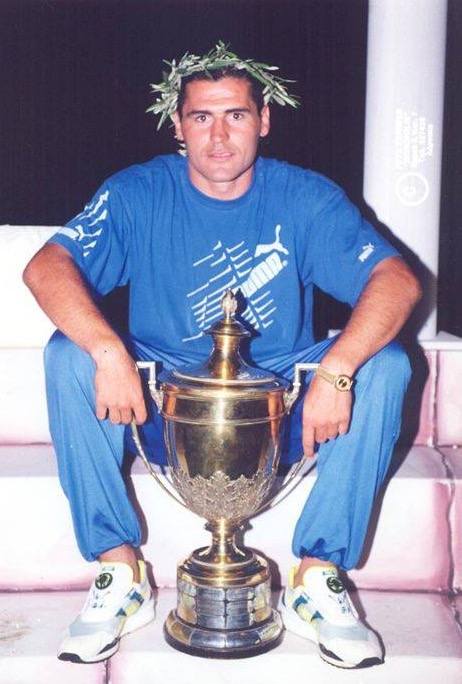
- Nikolic at Anorthosis Famagusta

Personal information
- Date of birth: 1 April 1965
- Place of birth: Skopje, SR Macedonia, SFR Yugoslavia
- Date of death: 4 February 2022 (aged 56)
- Place of death: Smederevska Palanka, Serbia
- Position: Forward

Youth career
- 1975–1983: Mladost Goša

Senior career*
Years	Team	Apps	(Gls)
1983-1986	Mladost Goša	10	(3)
1986-1987	Radnički Kragujevac	10	(3)
1987-1988	Jedinstvo Brčko	35	(10)
1988–1990	Šibenik	75	(22)
1990-1992	Bor	50	(18)
1992–1994	Enosis Neon Paralimni	49	(22)
1994–1995	Anorthosis Famagusta	25	(13)
1995–1996	Aris Limassol	24	(12)
1996	Denizlispor	9	(0)
1997	Veria	12	(2)
1997–1998	Anagennisi Deryneia	23	(11)
1998–1999	Napredak Kušiljevo	32	(13)
1999–2000	Mogren	16	(6)
2000–2003	Ljubić Prnjavor	42	(32)
2003-2004	Leotar	32	(15)
2004-2005	Sloga Doboj	32	(13)
2005-2009	Ljubić Prnjavor	120	(56)

Managerial career
- 2005–2009: Ljubić Prnjavor (youth)
- 2009–2010: Ljubić Prnjavor
- 2010–2011: GFK Jasenica 1911
- 2011–2012: Morava Velika Plana
- 2012–2013: Šumadinac Natalinci
- 2013–2014: Napredak Markovac
- 2015–2016: Mladi Borac Orašje
- 2016–2018: GFK Jasenica 1911
- 2020–2021: Mladi Borac Orašje
- * Club domestic league appearances and goals

Srboljub Nikolić (Serbian Cyrillic: Србољуб Николић; Greek: Σέρπολ Νίκολιτς; 1 April 1965 – 4 February 2022) was a Serbian football player and manager who played as a forward.

== Playing career ==
Nikolić started his club playing career in his hometown with FK Mladost Goša (current name GFK Jasenica 1911), where he played through youth categories to senior team. Nikolić initiated his international career when he joined Enosis Neon Paralimni in 1992 to play in Cypriot First Division. In 1995 he won the Cyprus Championship with Anorthosis Famagusta scoring 23 goals (16 in the league 16, six in the cup, one in the UEFA Cup).

Nikolić was very dedicated to football training and played until the age of 44. He played for teams from several countries including Yugoslavia, Cyprus, Turkey, Greece, Serbia, Bosnia and Herzegovina and Montenegro.

== Personal life and death ==
Outside of football, Nikolić led a quiet life. He was married and had a son. Nikolić died on 4 February 2022, at the age of 56.
