= 1964–65 Yugoslav Second League =

Yugoslav Second League
- Season: 1964–65
- Champions: Olimpija Ljubljana (West Division); Radnički Belgrade (East Division)
- Promoted: Olimpija Ljubljana; Radnički Belgrade
- Relegated: BSK Slavonski Brod; Kladivar; Mladost; Bregalnica Štip

The 1964–65 Yugoslav Second League season was the 19th season of the Second Federal League (Serbo-Croatian: Druga savezna liga), the second level association football competition of SFR Yugoslavia, since its establishment in 1946. The league was contested in two regional groups (West Division and East Division), with 16 clubs each.

== West Division ==
=== Teams ===
A total of sixteen teams contested the league, including thirteen sides from the 1963–64 season and three sides promoted from the third tier leagues played in the 1963–64 season. The league was contested in a double round robin format, with each club playing every other club twice, for a total of 30 rounds. Two points were awarded for wins and one point for draws.

There were no teams relegated from the 1963–64 Yugoslav First League as the 14th placed Vardar was allowed to remain in the top level. The three clubs promoted to the second level were Kladivar, Rudar Kakanj and RNK Split.

Locations of teams' home cities in the 1964–65 Yugoslav Second League West

Team	Location	Federal subject	Position in 1963–64
Borac Banja Luka	Banja Luka	SR Bosnia and Herzegovina	3rd
Borovo	Borovo Naselje	SR Croatia	13th
BSK Slavonski Brod	Slavonski Brod	SR Croatia	11th
Čelik	Zenica	SR Bosnia and Herzegovina	8th
Famos Hrasnica	Hrasnica	SR Bosnia and Herzegovina	14th
Istra	Pula	SR Croatia	12th
Kladivar	Celje	SR Slovenia	—
Lokomotiva Zagreb	Zagreb	SR Croatia	10th
Maribor	Maribor	SR Slovenia	2nd
Olimpija Ljubljana	Ljubljana	SR Slovenia	4th
Slavonija Osijek	Osijek	SR Croatia	5th
Rudar Kakanj	Kakanj	SR Bosnia and Herzegovina	—
Sloboda	Tuzla	SR Bosnia and Herzegovina	6th
RNK Split	Split	SR Croatia	—
Šibenik	Šibenik	SR Croatia	9th
Varteks	Varaždin	SR Croatia	7th

=== League table ===
Pos	Team	Pld	W	D	L	GF	GA	GR	Pts	Promotion or relegation
1	Olimpija (C, P)	30	21	7	2	84	25	3.360	49	Promotion to Yugoslav First League
2	Sloboda Tuzla	30	20	7	3	64	22	2.909	47	
3	Maribor	30	16	6	8	56	33	1.697	38	
4	Šibenik	30	13	8	9	37	42	0.881	34	
5	Čelik	30	13	6	11	48	42	1.143	32	
6	Slavonija	30	11	8	11	59	48	1.229	30	
7	Rudar Kakanj	30	13	4	13	56	58	0.966	30	
8	Borac Banja Luka	30	9	12	9	49	51	0.961	30	
9	Famos Hrasnica	30	9	10	11	43	59	0.729	28	
10	Borovo	30	8	11	11	39	45	0.867	27	
11	Lokomotiva Zagreb	30	8	11	11	52	61	0.852	27	
12	RNK Split	30	9	6	15	34	53	0.642	24	
13	Varteks	30	8	7	15	35	44	0.795	23	
14	Istra Pula	30	8	7	15	28	46	0.609	23	
15	BSK Slavonski Brod (R)	30	6	7	17	47	71	0.662	19	Relegation to Third Level
16	Kladivar (R)	30	6	7	17	31	62	0.500	19	Relegation to Third Level

Source: fsgzrenjanin.com
Rules for classification: 1st points; 2nd goal average.
(C) Champions; (P) Promoted; (R) Relegated

== East Division ==
=== Teams ===
A total of sixteen teams contested the league, including twelve sides from the 1963–64 season, one club relegated from the 1963–64 Yugoslav First League and three sides promoted from the third tier leagues played in the 1963–64 season. The league was contested in a double round robin format, with each club playing every other club twice, for a total of 30 rounds. Two points were awarded for wins and one point for draws.

Novi Sad were relegated from the 1963–64 Yugoslav First League after finishing in the 13th place of the league table. The three clubs promoted to the second level were Bregalnica Štip, Mladost and Voždovački.

Locations of teams' home cities in the 1964–65 Yugoslav Second League East

Team	Location	Federal subject	Position in 1963–64
Bačka	Bačka Palanka	(Socialist Republic of Serbia) SAP Vojvodina	9th
Bor	Bor	SR Serbia	2nd
Borac Čačak	Čačak	SR Serbia	8th
Bregalnica Štip	Štip	SR Macedonia	—
Budućnost	Titograd	SR Montenegro	7th
Mladost	Smederevska Palanka	SR Serbia	—
Novi Sad	Novi Sad	(Socialist Republic of Serbia) SAP Vojvodina	—
Pobeda	Prilep	SR Macedonia	4th
Prishtina	Pristina	(Socialist Republic of Serbia) SAP Kosovo	13th
Proleter Zrenjanin	Zrenjanin	(Socialist Republic of Serbia) SAP Vojvodina	11th
Radnički Belgrade	Belgrade	SR Serbia	3rd
Spartak Subotica	Subotica	(Socialist Republic of Serbia) SAP Vojvodina	12th
Srem	Sremska Mitrovica	(Socialist Republic of Serbia) SAP Vojvodina	10th
Trepča	Kosovska Mitrovica	(Socialist Republic of Serbia) SAP Kosovo	5th
Voždovački	Belgrade	SR Serbia	—
Železničar Niš	Niš	SR Serbia	6th

=== League table ===
Pos	Team	Pld	W	D	L	GF	GA	GR	Pts	Promotion or relegation
1	Radnički Beograd (C, P)	30	16	9	5	72	38	1.895	41	Promotion to Yugoslav First League
2	Proleter Zrenjanin	30	15	9	6	69	41	1.683	39	
3	Budućnost	30	16	7	7	47	27	1.741	39	
4	Železničar Niš	30	14	8	8	56	37	1.514	36	
5	Srem	30	13	7	10	49	41	1.195	33	
6	Novi Sad	30	12	9	9	44	40	1.100	33	
7	Prishtina	30	14	4	12	45	46	0.978	32	
8	Spartak Subotica	30	10	10	10	40	34	1.176	30	
9	Bačka	30	9	12	9	43	47	0.915	30	
10	Borac Čačak	30	10	8	12	40	39	1.026	28	
11	Voždovački	30	10	7	13	37	50	0.740	27	
12	Pobeda	30	9	9	12	33	58	0.569	27	
13	Trepča	30	9	8	13	48	51	0.941	26	
14	Bor	30	9	6	15	47	48	0.979	24	
15	Mladost (R)	30	6	6	18	26	57	0.456	18	Relegation to Third Level
16	Bregalnica Shtip (R)	30	4	9	17	25	67	0.373	17	Relegation to Third Level

Source: fsgzrenjanin.com
Rules for classification: 1st points; 2nd goal average.
(C) Champions; (P) Promoted; (R) Relegated

== See also ==
- 1964–65 Yugoslav First League
- 1964–65 Yugoslav Cup
