= Yiangoudakis =

Yiangoudakis is a surname. Notable people with the surname include:

- Rafael Yiangoudakis (born 1990), Cypriot footballer
- Yiannakis Yiangoudakis (born 1959), Cypriot footballer
