= Nenad Sakić =

Serbian football manager and player

Personal information
- Date of birth: 15 June 1971 (age 55)
- Place of birth: Kruševac, SFR Yugoslavia
- Height: 1.80 m (5 ft 11 in)
- Position: Defender

Team information
- Current team: Red Star Belgrade (assistant coach)

Senior career*
Years	Team	Apps	(Gls)
1989–1994	Napredak Kruševac	89	(4)
1994–1997	Red Star Belgrade	83	(4)
1997–1998	Lecce	32	(0)
1998–2004	Sampdoria	137	(1)
2004–2006	Napredak Kruševac	46	(2)
Total		387	(11)

International career
1998–2000	FR Yugoslavia	6	(0)

Managerial career
- 2008–2009: Napredak Kruševac
- 2011–2012: Serbia U17
- 2012–2013: Serbia (assistant)
- 2013–2015: Sampdoria (assistant)
- 2015–2016: Milan (assistant)
- 2017: Napredak Kruševac
- 2018–2019: Serbia U19
- 2019–2020: Trayal Kruševac
- 2021–2022: Red Star Belgrade (assistant)
- 2022–2023: Sampdoria (assistant)
- 2023–2024: Ferencváros (assistant)
- 2024–2025: Spartak Moscow (assistant)
- 2025-: Red Star Belgrade (assistant)
- * Club domestic league appearances and goals

Nenad Sakić (Serbian Cyrillic: Ненад Сакић; born 15 June 1971) is a Serbian football manager and former player. He is the assistant manager of Russian club Spartak Moscow.

== Club career ==
Sakić came to Napredak Kruševac in 1989 and spent five seasons with the club. He was signed by Red Star Belgrade in 1994, helping them win the championship in his debut season. During his time with the Crveno-beli, Sakić also won three consecutive national cups.

In 1997, Sakić moved abroad to Italy and signed with Serie A side Lecce. He played regularly during his only season at the club, before switching to Sampdoria. From 1998 to 2004, Sakić played 137 league games for Sampdoria, scoring once. He played two more seasons with Napredak Kruševac before retiring.

== International career ==
Between 1998 and 2000, Sakić was capped six time for FR Yugoslavia, making his debut in a friendly against Brazil (1–1 draw).

== Managerial career ==
In December 2008, it was announced that Sakić would be taking charge of Napredak Kruševac. He was also manager of Serbia U17, before serving as an assistant to Siniša Mihajlović during Mihajlović's managerial stints with Serbia, Sampdoria and Milan.

Since 2021, he works as an assistant to Dejan Stanković in the clubs Stanković is managing.

== Career statistics ==
Appearances and goals by club, season and competition
Club	Season	League	
Club	Season	Apps	Goals
Napredak Kruševac	1989–90	6	1
Napredak Kruševac	1990–91	3	0
Napredak Kruševac	1991–92	15	1
Napredak Kruševac	1992–93	33	1
Napredak Kruševac	1993–94	32	1
Napredak Kruševac	2004–05	19	0
Napredak Kruševac	2005–06	27	2
Napredak Kruševac	Total	135	6

== Honours ==
Red Star Belgrade

- First League of FR Yugoslavia: 1994–95
- FR Yugoslavia Cup: 1994–95, 1995–96, 1996–97
