= Giannakis =

Giannakis is both a surname and a given name. Notable people with the name include:

- Panagiotis Giannakis
- Georgios B. Giannakis
- Giannakis Giangoudakis
