= Rade Mojović =

Serbian footballer

Personal information
- Full name: Rade Mojović
- Date of birth: 1 June 1971 (age 55)
- Place of birth: Titovo Užice, SR Serbia, SFR Yugoslavia
- Height: 1.90 m (6 ft 3 in)
- Position: Goalkeeper

Youth career
- 1978-1986: Javor Ivanjica
- 1986-1989: Partizan

Senior career*
Years	Team	Apps	(Gls)
1989–1993	Partizan	0	(0)
1993–1994	Obilić		
1994–1995	Red Star Belgrade	1	(0)
1995–1996	Beltinci	5	(0)
1996–1998	Mouscron	3	(0)
1998–2000	Royal Antwerp	3	(0)
2000–2002	Eendracht Aalst	5	(0)
2002–2003	RFC Athois		
2003–2005	Francs Borains		
Total		17	(0)

Managerial career
- 2016-2017: Francs Borains (gk coach)
- 2017-2018: Ronse (gk coach)
- 2018-: Mouscron (gk coach)
- Belgium (gk coach)
- 2022-2023: Francs Borains (gk coach)
- 2023-: Esplechin
- * Club domestic league appearances and goals

Rade Mojović (Serbian Cyrillic: Раде Мојовић; born 1 June 1971) is a Serbian retired footballer who played as a goalkeeper.

== Career ==
After spending some time at Obilić, Mojović was transferred to Red Star Belgrade and recorded one league appearance in the 1994–95 season, as the team won the double. He subsequently moved abroad and signed with Slovenian club Beltinci.

Following his move to Belgium in 1996, Mojović spent the rest of his career there and went on to play for Mouscron, Royal Antwerp, Eendracht Aalst, and Francs Borains.

After his playing career, Mojović worked as a goalkeeper coach at several Belgian clubs and the Belgian FA.

== Honours ==
Red Star Belgrade

- First League of FR Yugoslavia: 1994–95
- FR Yugoslavia Cup: 1994–95
