= Mirović =

Mirović (Serbian: Мировић) is a South Slavic surname. It may refer to:

- Bob Mirovic (born 1966), Australian boxer
- Goran Mirović (born 1982), footballer
- Igor Mirović (born 1968), politician
- Berislav Mirović (born 1982), Aircraft Mechanic
