= Nikola Radmanović =

Serbian footballer (1969–2022)

Personal information
- Date of birth: 1 March 1969
- Place of birth: Bihać, SR Bosnia and Herzegovina, SFR Yugoslavia
- Date of death: 21 July 2022 (aged 53)
- Height: 1.80 m (5 ft 11 in)
- Position: Defensive midfielder

Senior career*
Years	Team	Apps	(Gls)
1988–1990	Vrbas	59	(1)
1991–1992	Bečej	29	(1)
1992–1996	Red Star Belgrade	91	(1)
1996–1997	Mérida	1	(0)
1999–2000	Spartak Subotica	4	(0)
Total		184	(3)

Managerial career
- 2009–2010: Red Star Belgrade (assistant)
- * Club domestic league appearances and goals

Nikola Radmanović (Serbian Cyrillic: Никола Радмановић; 1 March 1969 – 21 July 2022) was a Serbian professional footballer who played as a defensive midfielder.

== Playing career ==
Born in Velika Gata, a village near Bihać, Radmanović spent two seasons with Vrbas from 1988 to 1990. He later played for Bečej in the 1991–92 Yugoslav Second League, winning the competition and promotion to the top flight.

In the summer of 1992, Radmanović was transferred to Red Star Belgrade. He spent the next four seasons with the club and won four major trophies. In the summer of 1996, Radmanović moved abroad to Spanish club Mérida, as the team would finish in first place in the 1996–97 Segunda División.

== Post-playing career ==
After hanging up his boots, Radmanović served as an assistant to Vladimir Petrović at Red Star Belgrade between 2009 and 2010.

== Honours ==
Bečej

- Yugoslav Second League: 1991–92

Red Star Belgrade

- First League of FR Yugoslavia: 1994–95
- FR Yugoslavia Cup: 1992–93, 1994–95, 1995–96

Mérida

- Segunda División: 1996–97
