= Milan Simeunović =

Serbian footballer (born 1967)

Personal information
- Full name: Milan Simeunović
- Date of birth: 14 May 1967 (age 59)
- Place of birth: Kraljevo, SFR Yugoslavia
- Height: 1.86 m (6 ft 1 in)
- Position: Goalkeeper

Senior career*
Years	Team	Apps	(Gls)
1989–1990	Borac Čačak	22	(0)
1990–1991	Sloboda Užice	12	(0)
1991–1992	Borac Banja Luka	28	(0)
1992–1996	Red Star Belgrade	27	(0)
1996–1997	Standard Liège	4	(0)
1998	IK Brage	12	(1)
1998–1999	Malmö FF	14	(0)
2000	Viborg FF	1	(0)
2001–2002	Silkeborg IF	0	(0)
Total		120	(1)
- * Club domestic league appearances and goals

Milan Simeunović (Serbian Cyrillic: Милан Симеуновић; born 14 May 1967) is a Serbian retired footballer who played as a goalkeeper.

== Career ==
Simeunović played for Borac Čačak in the 1989–90 Yugoslav Second League, Sloboda Užice in the 1990–91 Yugoslav Second League, and Borac Banja Luka in the 1991–92 Yugoslav First League. He won the 1992 Mitropa Cup with the latter side. In the summer of 1992, Simeunović was transferred to Red Star Belgrade. He spent the next four seasons with the club and won four major trophies.

In the summer of 1996, Simeunović moved abroad to Belgian club Standard Liège. He later played for two Swedish clubs (IK Brage and Malmö FF) and two Danish clubs (Viborg FF and Silkeborg IF).

== Honours ==
Borac Banja Luka

- Mitropa Cup: 1992

Red Star Belgrade

- First League of FR Yugoslavia: 1994–95
- FR Yugoslavia Cup: 1992–93, 1994–95, 1995–96
