= Goran Mirović =

Serbian footballer

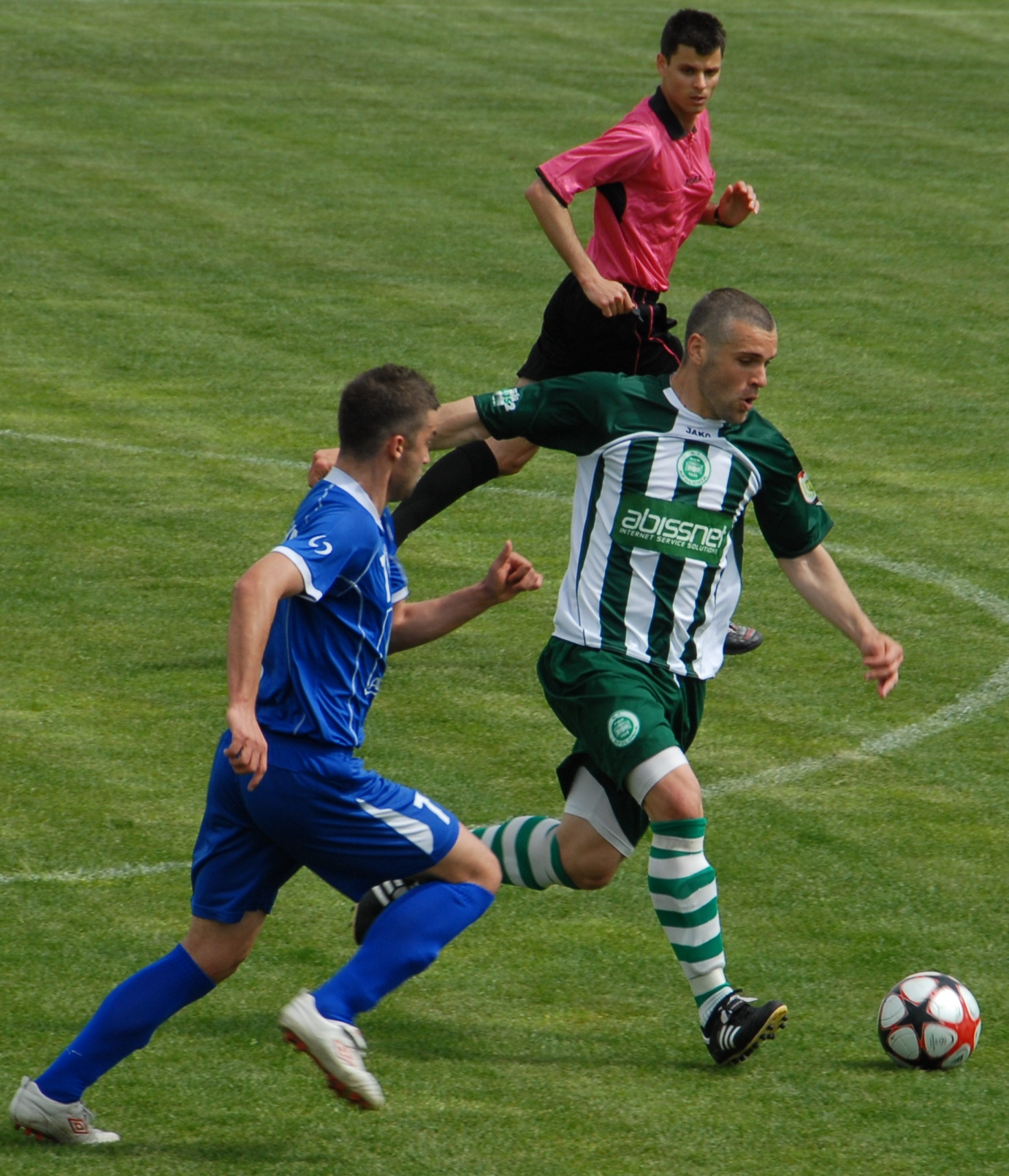

Personal information
- Full name: Goran Mirović
- Date of birth: May 18, 1982 (age 44)
- Place of birth: Smederevska Palanka, SFR Yugoslavia
- Height: 1.83 m (6 ft 0 in)
- Position: Midfielder

Senior career*
Years	Team	Apps	(Gls)
1998–2002	Mladost Goša		
2002–2003	Pelister		
2002–2003	Tikves	18	(0)
2003–2004	Morava Velika Plana		
2005–2006	Selevac		
2006–2008	Šumadija Jagnjilo		
2008	Borac Šamac		
2009	Mladenovac	12	(0)
2009	Pelister	14	(2)
2010	Apolonia Fier	13	(0)
2010–2011	Gramshi		
2011	Mladenovac	8	(0)
2012	Rudar Prijedor	12	(1)
2012–2013	Mladenovac	12	(0)
2013–2014	Jasenica 1911		
2014–2016	Mihajlovac 1934		
2016–2017	Proleter Vranovo		
- * Club domestic league appearances and goals

Goran Mirović (Serbian Cyrillic: Горан Мировић; born 18 May 1982) is a Serbian retired footballer. He played as midfielder. He ended his career in 2017.

He also played at Premier League of Bosnia and Herzegovina club FK Rudar Prijedor, Macedonian First League clubs GFK Tikvesh and FK Pelister, First League of the Republika Srpska club FK Borac Šamac, Albanian Superliga club FK Apolonia Fier, and Serbian First League club OFK Mladenovac.
