= FK Jasenica 2017 =

Jasenica 2017
- Full name: Fudbalski Klub Jasenica 2017
- Founded: 23 January 2017; 9 years ago
- Ground: Smederevska Palanka City Stadium
- Capacity: 3,000
- President: Zoran Živanović
- League: Dunav Zone League
- 2024–25: Podunavlje District League, 1st (promoted)

FK Jasenica 2017 (Serbian Cyrillic: ФК Јасеница 2017) is a football club from Smederevska Palanka, Serbia. The club currently competes in the 4th-tier Dunav Zone League.

== History ==
In 2016 the municipality of Smederevska Palanka decided to close local football club GFK Jasenica 1911 down and a new club was founded in January 2017 as FK Jasenica 2017.

=== Recent league history ===
| Season | Division | P | W | D | L | F | A | Pts | Pos |
|---|---|---|---|---|---|---|---|---|---|
| 2020–21 | 4 - Podunavlje-Šumadija Zone League | 34 | 8 | 8 | 18 | 21 | 58 | 32 | 15th |
| 2021–22 | 5 - Podunavlje District League | 28 | 12 | 3 | 13 | 43 | 45 | 39 | 7th |
| 2022–23 | 5 - Podunavlje District League | 30 | 14 | 6 | 10 | 67 | 52 | 48 | 4th |
| 2023–24 | 5 - Podunavlje District League | 30 | 21 | 1 | 8 | 90 | 44 | 64 | 3rd |
| 2024–25 | 5 - Podunavlje District League | 26 | 21 | 3 | 2 | 92 | 32 | 66 | 1st |

== Honours ==
Podunavlje District League (2)

- 2019–20, 2024-25
