= Mitko Stojkovski =

Macedonian footballer (born 1972)

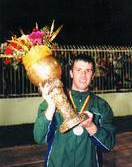
- Stojkovski with the 2001 Macedonian Cup following a 2–1 victory over Sloga Jugomagnat in the final.

Personal information
- Full name: Mitko Stojkovski
- Date of birth: 18 December 1972 (age 53)
- Place of birth: Bitola, SR Macedonia, SFR Yugoslavia
- Height: 1.83 m (6 ft 0 in)
- Position: Left-back

Youth career
- Pelister

Senior career*
Years	Team	Apps	(Gls)
1989–1991	Pelister	54	(1)
1991–1995	Red Star Belgrade	123	(2)
1995–1997	Real Oviedo	63	(1)
1998–2000	VfB Stuttgart	20	(0)
2000–2001	Pelister	34	(2)
Total		294	(6)

International career
1994–2002	Macedonia	28	(5)
- * Club domestic league appearances and goals

Mitko Stojkovski (Macedonian: Митко Стојковски; born 18 December 1972) is a Macedonian former professional footballer who played as a defender.

== Club career ==
Stojkovski started his career playing with his home town club FK Pelister, back then playing in the Yugoslav Second League. In 1991 his skills were noted and he moves to the 1991 European Champions Red Star Belgrade where he stayed four seasons and played over 120 games. In the legendary 100th eternal derby against their greatest rivals Partizan, he scored and was named the man of the match. In 1995, he signed with Spanish La Liga club Real Oviedo where he played 67 league matches in two seasons with the side. In 1998 VfB Stuttgart signed him and he was part of the team that reached the 1998 UEFA Cup Winners' Cup Final where they lost against Chelsea. After two and a half years in Germany, he returned to Pelister where he retired in 2001 by winning the Macedonian Cup that year.

After retiring, for a period he was a sports director at FK Pelister.

== International career ==
Stojkovski made his debut for the Macedonia national team in a March 1994 friendly match against Slovenia, he has earned 28 caps, scoring 5 goals in total. His final international was a November 2002 friendly against Israel.

== Honours ==
Red Star

- Yugoslav First League and First League of FR Yugoslavia: 1991–92, 1994–95
- FR Yugoslav Cup: 1992–93, 1994–95

Stuttgart

- German League Cup runner-up: 1998
- UEFA Cup Winners' Cup runner-up: 1997–98

Pelister

- Macedonian Cup: 2001
