= Bratislav Živković (footballer) =

Serbian football manager and player

Personal information
- Full name: Bratislav Živković
- Date of birth: 28 November 1970 (age 55)
- Place of birth: Leskovac, SR Serbia, SFR Yugoslavia
- Height: 1.84 m (6 ft 0 in)
- Position: Wing-back

Youth career
- Dubočica

Senior career*
Years	Team	Apps	(Gls)
1988–1990	Dubočica		
1990–1994	Vojvodina	39	(2)
1994–1998	Red Star Belgrade	99	(5)
1998–2004	Sampdoria	106	(4)
2004–2005	Obilić	4	(0)
Total		248	(11)

International career
1996–1998	FR Yugoslavia	6	(0)

Managerial career
- 2012: Sopot
- 2013–2014: Red Star Belgrade (assistant)
- 2014–2015: Lierse SK (assistant)
- 2015–2016: Voždovac
- 2017: Radnik Surdulica
- 2017: Napredak Kruševac (assistant)
- 2018: Red Star Belgrade (youth)
- 2019: Guangzhou R&F (assistant)
- 2020: Inđija
- 2021–2025: Serbia (coach)
- * Club domestic league appearances and goals

Bratislav Živković (Serbian Cyrillic: Братислав Живковић; born 28 November 1970) is a Serbian football manager and former player.

== Club career ==
During his career that spanned from the late 1980s to the mid 2000s, Živković played for Dubočica, Vojvodina, Red Star Belgrade, Sampdoria, and Obilić.

== International career ==
At international level, Živković was capped six times by FR Yugoslavia between 1996 and 1998; his final international was a February 1998 friendly match away against Argentina.

== Post-playing career ==
In July 2007, Živković was named the president of his hometown club Dubočica.

He worked as an assistant to head coach Slaviša Stojanović at Belgian side Lierse SK and in March 2015, Živković was appointed manager of Voždovac.

When Dragan Stojković was appointed head coach of the Serbia national team in March 2021, he brought in Živković as one of three coaches.

== Honours ==
Red Star Belgrade

- First League of FR Yugoslavia: 1994–95
- FR Yugoslavia Cup: 1994–95, 1995–96, 1996–97
