= Darko Pivaljević =

Serbian football manager and player

Personal information
- Full name: Darko Pivaljević
- Date of birth: 18 February 1975 (age 51)
- Place of birth: Valjevo, SFR Yugoslavia
- Height: 1.78 m (5 ft 10 in)
- Position: Striker

Youth career
- Krušik Valjevo

Senior career*
Years	Team	Apps	(Gls)
1993–1994	Čukarički		
1994–1995	Red Star Belgrade	7	(2)
1995–1996	Čukarički	19	(3)
1996–1997	Mladost Lučani	24	(12)
1997–2000	Royal Antwerp	80	(49)
2000–2002	1. FC Köln	8	(1)
2001–2002	→ Charleroi (loan)	19	(9)
2002–2003	Rad	25	(7)
2003–2004	Royal Antwerp	18	(4)
2004–2007	Cercle Brugge	78	(17)
2007–2011	Royal Antwerp	94	(23)
2011–2012	Cappellen		
2012–2013	Merksem		
2013–2014	Edegem		
Total		372	(127)

Managerial career
- 2012–2013: Merksem (player-manager)
- * Club domestic league appearances and goals

Darko Pivaljević (Serbian Cyrillic: Дарко Пиваљевић; born 18 February 1975) is a Serbian football manager and former player.

== Playing career ==
Pivaljević appeared in seven games and scored two goals for Red Star Belgrade in the 1994–95 First League of FR Yugoslavia, as the team won the title. He subsequently played with Čukarički and Mladost Lučani, before moving abroad to Belgian First Division club Royal Antwerp in the 1997 summer transfer window.

After three prolific seasons at Antwerp, the last two of which were in the Belgian Second Division, Pivaljević secured a transfer to Bundesliga side 1. FC Köln in 2000. He, however, failed to make an impact with the German team and was loaned to Belgian First Division club Charleroi in November 2001. At the end of the season, Pivaljević terminated his contract with 1. FC Köln and signed with Rad in his homeland.

In 2003, Pivaljević moved back to Belgium and rejoined Royal Antwerp for one year. He subsequently spent three seasons with Cercle Brugge until 2007, before returning to Royal Antwerp once again. Later on, Pivaljević signed with Belgian Fourth Division club Cappellen in August 2011.

== Managerial career ==
In the 2012–13 season, Pivaljević served as player-manager of Belgian Fourth Division club Merksem.

== Honours ==
Red Star Belgrade

- First League of FR Yugoslavia: 1994–95
