= Ivan Adžić =

Serbian footballer

Personal information
- Full name: Ivan Adžić
- Date of birth: 21 June 1973 (age 53)
- Place of birth: Belgrade, SR Serbia, SFR Yugoslavia
- Height: 1.80 m (5 ft 11 in)
- Position: Midfielder

Youth career
- Red Star Belgrade

Senior career*
Years	Team	Apps	(Gls)
1989–1996	Red Star Belgrade	114	(9)
1991	→ Borac Banja Luka (loan)	16	(2)
1996	Logroñés	3	(0)
1997	Toledo	13	(2)
1998	Borac Čačak	11	(3)
1998–1999	Rapid Wien	22	(2)
1999	Borac Čačak	3	(0)
Total		182	(18)

Managerial career
- 2004–2006: Red Star Belgrade (assistant)
- 2007: Mladenovac
- 2008–2009: Rudar Pljevlja
- * Club domestic league appearances and goals

Ivan Adžić (Serbian Cyrillic: Иван Аџић; born 21 June 1973) is a Serbian former professional footballer who played as a midfielder.

== Playing career ==
Adžić came through the youth system of Red Star Belgrade, making his senior debut on 2 December 1989, at the age of 16. He came on as a substitute for Darko Pančev in a 3–1 away league win over Spartak Subotica. In the first half of the 1991–92 season, Adžić played on loan for Borac Banja Luka, before returning to his parent club.

== Post-playing career ==
After hanging up his boots, Adžić served as assistant manager to Ratko Dostanić and Walter Zenga at Red Star Belgrade from 2004 to 2006. He also spent one season as manager of Montenegrin club Rudar Pljevlja.

Between 2009 and 2011, Adžić served as sporting director of Red Star Belgrade. He was appointed as sporting director of Železničar Pančevo in August 2022.

== Personal life ==
Adžić is the father of fellow footballer Luka Adžić.

== Career statistics ==
Club	Season	League	
Club	Season	Apps	Goals
Red Star Belgrade	1989–90	2	0
Red Star Belgrade	1990–91	4	1
Red Star Belgrade	1991–92	3	0
Red Star Belgrade	1992–93	22	0
Red Star Belgrade	1993–94	23	2
Red Star Belgrade	1994–95	33	6
Red Star Belgrade	1995–96	27	0
Red Star Belgrade	Total	114	9
Borac Banja Luka (loan)	1991–92	16	2
Logroñés	1996–97	3	0
Toledo	1996–97	13	2
Borac Čačak	1997–98	11	3
Rapid Wien	1998–99	22	2
Borac Čačak	1999–2000	3	0
Career total		182	18

== Honours ==
Red Star Belgrade

- Yugoslav First League: 1989–90, 1990–91, 1991–92
- First League of FR Yugoslavia: 1994–95
- Yugoslav Cup: 1989–90
- FR Yugoslavia Cup: 1992–93, 1994–95, 1995–96
