= Nebojša Krupniković =

Serbian footballer (born 1973)

Personal information
- Date of birth: 15 August 1973 (age 53)
- Place of birth: Arilje, SFR Yugoslavia
- Height: 1.84 m (6 ft 0 in)
- Position: Attacking midfielder

Youth career
- Red Star Belgrade

Senior career*
Years	Team	Apps	(Gls)
1991–1996	Red Star Belgrade	72	(43)
1992	→ Radnički Beograd (loan)	8	(0)
1993	→ Bor (loan)		
1993–1994	→ Panionios (loan)	30	(9)
1996	Standard Liège	15	(5)
1997–1998	Gamba Osaka	40	(11)
1999	Bastia	10	(1)
1999–2000	Chemnitzer FC	38	(9)
2001–2005	Hannover 96	117	(17)
2005	Arminia Bielefeld	8	(3)
2006	JEF United Chiba	25	(5)
2007–2008	SC Paderborn	29	(2)
Total		392	(105)

International career
1991	Yugoslavia U18	2	(1)
- * Club domestic league appearances and goals

Nebojša Krupniković (Serbian Cyrillic: Небојша Крупниковић; born 15 August 1973) is a Serbian former professional footballer who played as an attacking midfielder.

== Club career ==
Born in Arilje, Krupniković started out at Red Star Belgrade, making his first senior appearances during the 1991–92 season. He went on loan to Greek club Panionios in 1993–94 in what would be his breakthrough season. After returning from loan, Krupniković established himself as the team's leader, helping them win the double in 1994–95. He was also instrumental in winning another national cup the following year.

In the summer of 1996, Krupniković was transferred abroad to Belgian side Standard Liège. He left the club over the next winter and went to Asia by signing with Japanese side Gamba Osaka. After spending two seasons in the Far East, Krupniković returned to Europe and joined French club Bastia in early 1999.

Between 1999 and 2008, Krupniković played for four clubs in Germany, aside from one year with JEF United Chiba in Japan. He is best remembered for his time at Hannover 96, helping them win promotion to the Bundesliga in 2002.

== International career ==
Despite enjoying success at club level, Krupniković failed to make his international debut for Serbia and Montenegro (previously known as FR Yugoslavia). He was only capped for Yugoslavia at youth level.

== Career statistics ==
Appearances and goals by club, season and competition
Club	Season	League		National cup		League cup		Continental		Total	
Club	Season	Apps	Goals	Apps	Goals	Apps	Goals	Apps	Goals	Apps	Goals
Red Star Belgrade	1991–92	2	0	0	0	—		0	0	2	0
Red Star Belgrade	1992–93	8	0	0	0	—		—		8	0
Red Star Belgrade	1993–94	0	0	0	0	—		—		0	0
Red Star Belgrade	1994–95	30	24	9	5	—		—		39	29
Red Star Belgrade	1995–96	32	19	9	7	—		2	0	43	26
Red Star Belgrade	Total	72	43	18	12	—		2	0	92	55
Radnički Beograd (loan)	1992–93	8	0			—		—		8	0
Bor (loan)	1992–93			—		—		—			
Panionios (loan)	1993–94	30	9			—		—		30	9
Standard Liège	1996–97	15	5			—				15	5
Gamba Osaka	1997	27	9	3	1	6	2	—		36	12
Gamba Osaka	1998	13	2	1	0	2	0	—		16	2
Gamba Osaka	Total	40	11	4	1	8	2	—		52	14
Bastia	1998–99	10	1	0	0	0	0	—		10	1
Chemnitzer FC	1999–2000	26	5	1	0	—		—		27	5
Chemnitzer FC	2000–01	12	4	1	0	—		—		13	4
Chemnitzer FC	Total	38	9	2	0	—		—		40	9
Hannover 96	2000–01	3	0	0	0	—		—		3	0
Hannover 96	2001–02	34	9	3	0	—		—		37	9
Hannover 96	2002–03	32	5	2	0	—		—		34	5
Hannover 96	2003–04	19	2	2	1	—		—		21	3
Hannover 96	2004–05	29	1	3	1	—		—		32	2
Hannover 96	Total	117	17	10	2	—		—		127	19
Arminia Bielefeld	2005–06	8	3	0	0	—		—		8	3
JEF United Chiba	2006	25	5	1	0	10	0	—		36	5
SC Paderborn	2006–07	12	2	0	0	—		—		12	2
SC Paderborn	2007–08	17	0	1	0	—		—		18	0
SC Paderborn	Total	29	2	1	0	—		—		30	2
Career total		392	105	36	15	18	2	2	0	448	122

== Honours ==
Red Star Belgrade

- First League of FR Yugoslavia: 1994–95
- FR Yugoslavia Cup: 1994–95, 1995–96

Hannover 96

- 2. Bundesliga: 2001–02

JEF United Chiba

- J.League Cup: 2006
