= 1994–95 First League of FR Yugoslavia =

First League of FR Yugoslavia
- Season: 1994–95
- Champions: Red Star; 21st domestic title
- Champions League: Red Star
- Cup Winners' Cup: Obilić
- Intertoto Cup: Budućnost Podgorica; Bečej
- Top goalscorer: Savo Milošević (30)

Statistics of First League of FR Yugoslavia (Serbian: Пpвa савезна лига, Prva savezna liga) for the 1994–95 season.

== Overview ==
Just as the previous season, the league consisted of 2 groups, A and B, each containing 10 clubs. Both groups were played in a league system. By winter break all clubs in each group had met each other twice, home and away, with the bottom four from A group moving to group B, and being replaced by the top four from the B group. At the end of the season the same situation happened with four teams being replaced from A and B groups, and in addition, the bottom three clubs from the B group were relegated into the Second League of FR Yugoslavia for the next season and replaced by the top three from that league.

At the end of the season Red Star Belgrade became champions.

FK Partizan striker Savo Milošević became the league's top-scorer for second consecutive time, this time with 30 goals.

The relegated clubs were FK Spartak Subotica, FK Sutjeska Nikšić, and FK Rudar Pljevlja.

That was the first season when Yugoslav clubs again qualified to the UEFA competitions after three years of ban due to UN embargo.

== Teams ==
Location of teams in the 1994–95 First League

Club	City	Stadium	Capacity
Partizan	Belgrade	Partizan Stadium	32,710
Red Star	Belgrade	Red Star Stadium	55,538
Vojvodina	Novi Sad	Karađorđe Stadium	17,204
Zemun	Zemun, Belgrade	Zemun Stadium	10,000
Rad	Belgrade	Stadion Kralj Petar I	6,000
Napredak Kruševac	Kruševac	Mladost Stadium	10,000
Radnički Niš	Niš	Čair Stadium	18,000
Hajduk Kula	Kula	Stadion Hajduk	6,000
Proleter	Zrenjanin	Stadion Karađorđev park	13,500
Budućnost Podgorica	Podgorica	Podgorica City Stadium	12,000
OFK Beograd	Karaburma, Belgrade	Omladinski Stadium	20,000
Bečej	Bečej	Stadion kraj Tise	3,000
Borac	Čačak	Čačak Stadium	6,000
Radnički Beograd	Novi Beograd	Stadion FK Radnički	5,000
Obilić	Belgrade	FK Obilić Stadium	4,500
Sutjeska	Nikšić	Gradski stadion (Nikšić)	10,800
Spartak	Subotica	Subotica City Stadium	13,000
Loznica	Loznica	Stadion Lagator	4,000
Sloboda	Užice	Užice City Stadium	12,000
Rudar Pljevlja	Pljevlja	Stadion pod Golubinjom	10,000

== Autumn ==
=== IA league ===
==== Table ====
Pos	Team	Pld	W	D	L	GF	GA	GD	Pts	Result
1	Vojvodina	18	11	5	2	34	18	+16	27	
2	Red Star	18	10	5	3	36	12	+24	25	
3	Partizan	18	10	5	3	42	15	+27	25	
4	Rad	18	6	7	5	16	16	0	19	
5	Zemun	18	7	4	7	18	27	−9	18	
6	OFK Beograd	18	6	6	6	18	23	−5	18	
7	Radnički Niš	18	7	4	7	23	21	+2	18	Transfer to Spring IB League
8	Napredak Kruševac	18	5	3	10	16	34	−18	13	Transfer to Spring IB League
9	Rudar Pljevlja	18	2	6	10	12	28	−16	10	Transfer to Spring IB League
10	Spartak Subotica	18	2	3	13	12	33	−21	7	Transfer to Spring IB League

==== Results ====
Home \ Away	NAP	OFK	PAR	RAD	RNI	RSB	RUD	SPA	VOJ	ZEM
Napredak Kruševac		1–1	0–4	0–0	0–0	1–3	3–1	1–0	1–2	1–0
OFK Beograd	5–1		0–5	0–0	1–0	2–1	3–0	0–0	0–0	0–2
Partizan	1–0	0–0		3–0	2–1	1–1	4–1	3–0	3–1	7–0
Rad	0–1	4–0	1–1		0–0	0–0	1–0	1–0	1–1	2–1
Radnički Niš	3–1	1–1	2–1	2–0		1–0	2–0	7–1	0–2	1–0
Red Star	4–0	2–0	3–2	0–1	3–0		3–1	3–0	2–2	5–0
Rudar Pljevlja	1–2	1–2	1–1	1–0	1–1	1–1		1–0	0–0	2–2
Spartak Subotica	4–3	0–2	0–1	2–3	3–1	0–0	0–0		0–2	1–2
Vojvodina	4–0	3–0	4–3	3–1	3–1	0–3	1–0	2–1		2–0
Zemun	1–0	2–1	0–0	1–1	2–0	0–2	2–0	1–0	2–2	

Source: EU-Football.info
Legend: Blue = home team win; Yellow = draw; Red = away team win.

=== IB league ===
==== Table ====
Pos	Team	Pld	W	D	L	GF	GA	GD	Pts	Result
1	Bečej	18	11	3	4	27	13	+14	25	Transfer to Spring IA League
2	Borac Čačak	18	11	3	4	30	14	+16	25	Transfer to Spring IA League
3	Radnički Beograd	18	11	2	5	24	16	+8	24	Transfer to Spring IA League
4	Hajduk Kula	18	8	6	4	25	17	+8	22	Transfer to Spring IA League
5	Budućnost Podgorica	18	9	3	6	27	16	+11	21	
6	Obilić	18	5	7	6	21	20	+1	17	
7	Proleter Zrenjanin	18	6	3	9	22	24	−2	15	
8	Loznica	18	5	5	8	21	29	−8	15	
9	Sloboda Užice	18	3	6	9	10	23	−13	12	
10	Sutjeska	18	1	2	15	10	45	−35	4	

==== Results ====
Home \ Away	BEČ	BOR	BUD	HAJ	LOZ	OBI	PRO	RNB	SLO	SUT
Bečej		1–0	2–1	2–0	1–0	1–0	3–2	2–0	2–1	2–0
Borac Čačak	1–1		3–1	1–0	4–1	2–1	3–0	1–0	2–0	4–0
Budućnost Podgorica	1–1	5–1		1–0	1–0	3–1	1–0	2–1	4–0	3–0
Hajduk Kula	2–1	1–0	1–0		1–1	2–1	2–0	1–2	2–1	6–2
Loznica	2–1	0–3	2–0	1–1		1–1	1–0	1–3	1–1	2–0
Obilić	1–0	0–0	1–1	1–1	2–1		1–0	0–1	0–1	4–0
Proleter Zrenjanin	0–3	2–0	1–0	1–1	5–3	1–1		1–0	4–1	3–0
Radnički Beograd	1–0	0–3	2–1	1–1	3–1	2–2	1–0		1–0	2–0
Sloboda Užice	0–0	0–0	0–0	0–0	1–1	1–2	2–1	0–2		1–0
Sutjeska	1–4	1–2	0–2	1–3	1–2	2–2	1–1	0–2	1–0	

Source: EU-Football.info
Legend: Blue = home team win; Yellow = draw; Red = away team win.

== Spring ==
=== IA league ===
==== Table ====
Pos	Team	Pld	W	D	L	GF	GA	GD	BP	Pts	Qualification or relegation
1	Red Star (C)	18	14	3	1	63	17	+46	11	42	Qualification for UEFA Cup preliminary round
2	Partizan	18	13	2	3	43	17	+26	10	38	
3	Vojvodina	18	10	4	4	37	26	+11	13	37	
4	Bečej	18	7	4	7	17	27	−10	8	26	Qualification for Intertoto Cup group stage
5	Zemun	18	6	5	7	24	25	−1	7	24	
6	OFK Beograd	18	7	3	8	21	28	−7	7	24	
7	Rad	18	4	6	8	22	38	−16	8	22	Transfer to 1995 Autumn IB League
8	Borac Čačak	18	3	6	9	15	28	−13	7	19	Transfer to 1995 Autumn IB League
9	Hajduk Kula	18	4	2	12	15	32	−17	5	15	Transfer to 1995 Autumn IB League
10	Radnički Beograd	18	3	3	12	20	39	−19	6	15	Transfer to 1995 Autumn IB League

(C) Champions

==== Results ====
Home \ Away	BEČ	BOR	HAJ	OFK	PAR	RAD	RNB	RSB	VOJ	ZEM
Bečej		2–0	3–1	2–0	0–2	1–1	1–0	2–2	0–0	1–0
Borac Čačak	3–0		2–0	0–1	0–1	0–0	2–0	3–7	1–2	0–0
Hajduk Kula	1–2	3–1		1–0	0–1	2–1	3–1	0–2	0–2	1–2
OFK Beograd	2–1	2–0	2–1		2–1	1–1	3–1	1–2	1–1	1–0
Partizan	3–0	1–1	4–1	4–0		3–0	5–1	2–2	4–2	2–1
Rad	3–0	1–1	0–0	2–1	1–3		1–0	1–3	4–4	0–1
Radnički Beograd	0–1	1–1	2–0	1–1	1–2	1–3		0–3	3–1	1–1
Red Star	5–0	6–0	4–0	5–0	2–1 (Note: The 100th Eternal derby.)	8–1	4–0		2–1	3–1
Vojvodina	3–0	1–0	2–0	2–1	1–3	4–1	4–3	2–2		4–1
Zemun	1–1	0–0	1–1	3–2	2–1	5–1	3–4	2–1	0–1	

Source: EU-Football.info
Legend: Blue = home team win; Yellow = draw; Red = away team win.

=== IB league ===
==== Table ====
Pos	Team	Pld	W	D	L	GF	GA	GD	BP	Pts	Qualification or relegation
1	Budućnost Podgorica	18	9	4	5	31	23	+8	8	30	Qualification for Intertoto Cup group stage Transfer to Autumn IA League
2	Radnički Niš	18	8	5	5	27	13	+14	8	29	Transfer to Autumn IA League
3	Proleter Zrenjanin	18	8	4	6	30	27	+3	4	24	Transfer to Autumn IA League
4	Napredak Kruševac	18	8	2	8	19	21	−2	5	23	Transfer to Autumn IA League
5	Obilić	18	7	3	8	25	27	−2	5	22	Qualification for Cup Winners' Cup qualifying round
6	Loznica	18	7	3	8	26	29	−3	4	21	
7	Sloboda Užice	18	7	5	6	16	18	−2	2	21	Qualification for relegation play-off
8	Spartak Subotica (R)	18	7	3	8	15	18	−3	3	20	Qualification for relegation play-off
9	Sutjeska (R)	18	7	2	9	23	25	−2	1	17	Relegation to Second League of FR Yugoslavia
10	Rudar Pljevlja (R)	18	5	3	10	17	28	−11	3	16	Relegation to Second League of FR Yugoslavia

(R) Relegated

==== Results ====
Home \ Away	BUD	LOZ	NAP	OBI	PRO	RNI	RUD	SLO	SPA	SUT
Budućnost Podgorica		4–0	1–0	2–1	2–2	2–1	3–1	0–0	2–0	5–1
Loznica	3–2		1–1	2–2	4–0	1–1	0–2	1–0	1–0	3–1
Napredak Kruševac	1–0	2–3		1–0	4–3	2–1	1–0	1–0	0–1	2–1
Obilić	1–1	1–0	1–0		2–1	0–0	6–2	4–2	1–0	3–2
Proleter Zrenjanin	5–1	2–1	4–1	1–0		1–1	2–0	1–0	2–0	3–1
Radnički Niš	0–1	3–1	1–0	2–0	5–0		3–0	4–0	3–2	1–0
Rudar Pljevlja	1–2	1–2	1–1	3–2	1–0	1–0		1–1	0–0	1–0
Sloboda Užice	1–1	3–2	1–0	2–0	2–1	1–1	1–0		0–0	1–0
Spartak Subotica	4–2	1–0	0–2	1–0	1–1	1–0	2–1	0–1		1–0
Sutjeska	1–0	3–1	2–0	5–1	1–1	0–0	2–1	1–0	2–1	

Source: EU-Football.info
Legend: Blue = home team win; Yellow = draw; Red = away team win.

== UEFA Cup Playoff ==
Team 1	Agg.	Team 2	1st leg	2nd leg
Budućnost Podgorica	4–6	Vojvodina	3–1	2–5

Vojvodina was qualified to the 1995–96 UEFA Cup but they are not admitted, along with Partizan, because the country coefficient of Yugoslavia has been recalculated due to the split up. Budućnost Podgorica was qualified to the 1995 UEFA Intertoto Cup.

== Relegation Playoff ==
Team 1	Agg.	Team 2	1st leg	2nd leg
Mladost Bački Jarak	3–1	Spartak Subotica	2–0	1–1
Sloboda Užice	2–2 (5–4 p)	Novi Pazar	2–0	0–2

== Winning squad ==
Champions: Red Star Belgrade (coach: Ljupko Petrović)

Players (league matches/league goals)

- (Federal Republic of Yugoslavia) Dejan Petković (36/8)
- (Federal Republic of Yugoslavia) Marko Perović (33/7)
- (Federal Republic of Yugoslavia) Ivan Adžić (33/6)
- (Federal Republic of Yugoslavia) Darko Kovačević (31/24)
- (Federal Republic of Yugoslavia) Zvonko Milojević (31/0) -goalkeeper-
- (Federal Republic of Yugoslavia) Nebojša Krupniković (30/23)
- (Federal Republic of Yugoslavia) Dejan Stefanović (30/9)
- (Federal Republic of Yugoslavia) Nenad Sakić (29/0)
- (North Macedonia) Mitko Stojkovski (28/1)
- (Federal Republic of Yugoslavia) Goran Đorović (28/0)
- (Federal Republic of Yugoslavia) Bratislav Živković (25/2)
- (Federal Republic of Yugoslavia) Nikola Radmanović (24/0)
- (Federal Republic of Yugoslavia) Goran Stojiljković (17/7)
- (Federal Republic of Yugoslavia) Srđan Bajčetić (14/1) sold to Celta de Vigo after 1st half of the season
- (Federal Republic of Yugoslavia) Predrag Stanković (13/2)
- (Federal Republic of Yugoslavia) Jovan Stanković (13/0)
- (Federal Republic of Yugoslavia) Darko Pivaljević (7/2)
- (Federal Republic of Yugoslavia) Zoran Riznić (7/2)
- (Federal Republic of Yugoslavia) Aleksandar Kristić (7/0)
- (Federal Republic of Yugoslavia) Dejan Stanković (7/0)
- (Federal Republic of Yugoslavia) Zoran Mašić (6/3)
- (Federal Republic of Yugoslavia) Milan Simeunović (4/0) -goalkeeper-
- (Federal Republic of Yugoslavia) Perica Ognjenović (3/0)
- (Federal Republic of Yugoslavia) Zoran Đorović (2/0)
- (Federal Republic of Yugoslavia) Vinko Marinović (2/0)
- (Federal Republic of Yugoslavia) Božidar Bandović (1/0)
- (Federal Republic of Yugoslavia) Miodrag Božović (1/0)
- (Federal Republic of Yugoslavia) Žarko Dragaš (1/0)
- (Federal Republic of Yugoslavia) Darko Ljubojević (1/0)
- (Federal Republic of Yugoslavia) Rade Mojović (1/0) -goalkeeper-

== Top goalscorers ==
Rank	Player	Club	Goals
1	(Federal Republic of Yugoslavia) Savo Milošević	Partizan	30
2	(Federal Republic of Yugoslavia) Darko Kovačević	Red Star	24
2	(Federal Republic of Yugoslavia) Nebojša Krupniković	Red Star	24
4	(Federal Republic of Yugoslavia) Miodrag Pantelić	Vojvodina	15
5	(Federal Republic of Yugoslavia) Dragan Radojičić	Vojvodina	14
6	(Federal Republic of Yugoslavia) Radivoje Manić	Radnički Niš	13
6	(Federal Republic of Yugoslavia) Radoslav Samardžić	Vojvodina	13
8	(Federal Republic of Yugoslavia) Zdravko Drinčić	Rad	10
8	(Federal Republic of Yugoslavia) Nenad Bjeković	Partizan	10
10	(Federal Republic of Yugoslavia) Dejan Stefanović	Red Star	9
10	(Federal Republic of Yugoslavia) Dragan Ćirić	Partizan	9
