= Perica Ognjenović =

Serbian footballer and manager (born 1977)

Personal information
- Date of birth: 24 February 1977 (age 49)
- Place of birth: Smederevska Palanka, SR Serbia, Yugoslavia
- Height: 1.70 m (5 ft 7 in)
- Positions: Forward; right winger

Youth career
- –1993: Mladost Smederevska Palanka

Senior career*
Years	Team	Apps	(Gls)
1993–1994	Mladost Smederevska Palanka	28	(9)
1994–1998	Red Star Belgrade	78	(19)
1999–2001	Real Madrid	12	(1)
2002	1. FC Kaiserslautern	2	(0)
2003	Dalian Shide	2	(0)
2003–2004	Dynamo Kyiv	2	(0)
2003–2004	→ Dynamo-2 Kyiv	21	(9)
2005	Angers	7	(0)
2006	Selangor	16	(2)
2006–2008	Ergotelis	26	(3)
2008–2009	Kallithea	9	(1)
2009–2011	Jagodina	43	(3)
Total		246	(46)

International career
1999	FR Yugoslavia U21	1	(0)
1995–1998	FR Yugoslavia	8	(0)

Managerial career
- 2015–2016: Red Star Belgrade (youth)
- 2017: Serbia U17
- 2017–2018: Serbia U19
- 2020: Zvijezda 09
- 2023: Metalist Kharkiv (assistant)
- 2023: Metalist Kharkiv (caretaker)
- 2025–2026: Rudar Prijedor
- 2026: Sloga Doboj
- * Club domestic league appearances and goals

Perica Ognjenović (Serbian Cyrillic: Перица Огњеновић; born 24 February 1977) is a Serbian professional football manager and former player who played as a forward or right winger.

At one point considered to be among Serbia's brightest footballing talents, Ognjenović signed with European giants Real Madrid in his early 20s, but never became a regular there, despite winning major titles, eventually going on to have an irregular career in six other countries. He represented FR Yugoslavia at the 1998 FIFA World Cup.

== Club career ==
=== Early career ===
Born in Smederevska Palanka, Serbia, Socialist Federal Republic of Yugoslavia, Ognjenović's first football steps were taken with modest hometown club Mladost Smederevska Palanka where he went through all age levels before breaking through to the senior squad just short of his 16th birthday, during the 1992–93 season. At the time, the team competed in the third division, and it soon became apparent the player's skill and talent far surpassed that level of competition.

Ognjenović caught the eye of country powerhouse Red Star Belgrade, which signed the promising youngster in the 1994 summer.

=== Real Madrid ===
A series of solid performances for Red Star earned Ognjenović a move to Real Madrid on 12 January 1999 for a transfer fee of DM5 million (€2.5 million), and a reported annual salary of DM1.2 million. The contract negotiations between his agent and Real president Lorenzo Sanz ran very long, as the team had a surplus of forwards on its roster and had to offload 17-year-old Samuel Eto'o on a loan spell to Espanyol before signing any new ones; everything was finally concluded just hours before the Spanish winter transfer window closed, and the player joined compatriot Predrag Mijatović at his new club.

Ognjenović's time in the Spanish capital was not a happy one overall: only after manager Guus Hiddink was replaced by John Toshack late into the 1998–99 season did he make his official debut with the Merengues, appearing as a second-half substitute in the Copa del Rey semi-final clash against Valencia (2–1 home win after a 0–6 away loss). He spent two and a half seasons with Real Madrid, amassing only around 30 appearances all competitions comprised – mostly from the bench – before being finally released during the summer of 2001; his only official goal came against Real Zaragoza in the 1999–2000 edition of the domestic cup (2–0 home win and on aggregate).

=== Journeyman years ===
For the following six months after leaving Real, Ognjenović could not find a team. He trained alone with a private coach until Kaiserslautern arranged a tryout and brought him in for free on 17 January 2002, in a deal until the end of the campaign with a two-year extension option; they finished seventh in the Bundesliga and qualified for the UEFA Intertoto Cup, but the player only appeared twice.

After failing to settle in Germany, Ognjenović's next stop was China with Dalian Shide, where he was brought to in January 2003 by the club's coach Milorad Kosanović, who had already managed him at Red Star. He then moved on to Dynamo Kyiv in late November 2003, but could not earn playing time there either; the next stop was in France, as he signed in January 2005 with Angers in Ligue 2.

In May 2006, Ognjenović joined Malaysian Super League side Selangor, signing a six-month contract– the team was sitting in last place at the time of his signing. His career settled relatively from 2006 to 2008 as he played with Greece's Ergotelis in the Super League, although he only appeared 26 times in the league combined; the following year was spent also in the country, with lowly Kallithea.

Ognjenović joined Jagodina on 29 July 2009, returning to his homeland after more than a decade.

== International career ==
Ognjenović made his debut for the Yugoslavia national team at only 18, in a friendly with El Salvador on 12 November 1995. The nation was suspended for the UEFA Euro 1996 qualifiers.

Subsequently, he was picked for the squad at the 1998 FIFA World Cup, appearing as a substitute in all three group stage matches as Yugoslavia exited in the Round-of-16.

== Honours ==
=== Player ===
Red Star Belgrade

- Yugoslav First League: 1994–95
- Yugoslav Cup: 1994–95, 1995–96, 1996–97

Real Madrid

- La Liga: 2000–01
- Supercopa de España: 2001
- UEFA Champions League: 1999–2000

Dynamo Kyiv

- Ukrainian Premier League: 2003–04
- Ukrainian Cup: 2004–05
