= 1992–93 FR Yugoslavia Cup =

Tournament details
- Country: Yugoslavia
- Teams: 32

Final positions
- Champions: Red Star
- Runners-up: Partizan

Tournament statistics
- Matches played: 46
- Goals scored: 143 (3.11 per match)

The 1992–93 FR Yugoslavia Cup was the first season of the FR Yugoslavia's annual football cup. Red Star Belgrade has the winner of the competition, after they defeated FK Partizan.

== First round ==
| Team 1 | Score | Team 2 |
|---|---|---|
| Agrounija Inđija (II) | 0–0 (5–4 p) | Rad |
| AIK Bačka Topola (III) | 2–1 | Napredak Kruševac |
| Novi Sad (II) | 2–0 | Spartak Subotica |
| Priština | 2–3 | Vojvodina |
| Jastrebac Niš (II) | 0–1 | Sutjeska |
| Kabel (III) | 3–1 | Bečej |
| Kom (?) | 2–1 | Borac Čačak (II) |
| Mladost Goša (?) | 1–4 | OFK Beograd |
| Mladost Lučani (II) | 2–1 | Radnički Kragujevac (II) |
| Radnički Niš | 0–1 | Mačva Šabac (II) |
| Radnički Novi Beograd | 3–0 | Mogren |
| Radnički Sombor (III) | 1–2 | Budućnost Podgorica |
| Rudar Pljevlja (II) | 1–4 | Partizan |
| Sloga Lipljan (?) | 0–7 | Zemun |
| Teleoptik (?) | 0–5 | Red Star |
| Zastava Kragujevac (II) | 1–0 | Proleter Zrenjanin |

Note: Roman numerals in brackets denote the league tier the clubs participated in the 1992–93 season.

== Second round ==
| Team 1 | Agg. | Team 2 | 1st leg | 2nd leg |
|---|---|---|---|---|
| Red Star | 8–3 | Radnički Novi Beograd | 3–2 | 5–1 |
| Novi Sad (II) | 3–0 | AIK Bačka Topola (III) | 3–0 | 0–0 |
| Kabel (III) | 3–4 | Agrounija Inđija (II) | 2–1 | 1–3 |
| Kom (?) | 0–6 | Zemun | 0–1 | 0–5 |
| Mladost Lučani (II) | 1-6 | Partizan | 1-2 | 0–4 |
| Sutjeska | 5–2 | Mačva Šabac (II) | 5–0 | 0–2 |
| Vojvodina | 3–3 (a) | Budućnost Podgorica | 2–2 | 1–1 |
| Zastava Kragujevac (II) | 3–3 (a) | OFK Beograd | 1–0 | 2–3 |

Note: Roman numerals in brackets denote the league tier the clubs participated in the 1992–93 season.

== Quarter-finals ==
| Team 1 | Agg. | Team 2 | 1st leg | 2nd leg |
|---|---|---|---|---|
| Zemun | 6–1 | Agrounija Inđija (II) | 5–1 | 1–0 |
| Novi Sad (II) | 2–5 | Partizan | 1–1 | 1–4 |
| Sutjeska | 2–3 | Red Star | 2–1 | 0–2 |
| Zastava Kragujevac (II) | 3–3 (a) | Budućnost Podgorica | 1–1 | 2–2 |

Note: Roman numerals in brackets denote the league tier the clubs participated in the 1992–93 season.

== Semi-finals ==
| Team 1 | Agg. | Team 2 | 1st leg | 2nd leg |
|---|---|---|---|---|
| Zemun | 2–6 | Red Star | 0–2 | 2–4 |
| Zastava Kragujevac (II) | 0–6 | Partizan | 0–4 | 0–2 |

Note: Roman numerals in brackets denote the league tier the clubs participated in the 1992–93 season.

== Final ==
=== First leg ===
8 May 1993

| Partizan | 1–0 | Red Star |
|---|---|---|
| Zahovič 29' | Report |

Partizan Stadium, Belgrade
Attendance: 30,000
Referee: Radisav Rabrenović (Novi Sad)

=== Second leg ===
15 May 1993

| Red Star | 1–0 | Partizan |
|---|---|---|
| Drobnjak 50' (yellow card) 79' (red card) | Report |
Penalties
| Ivić (penalty scored); Vidaković (penalty scored); Vasilijević (penalty scored); Stojkovski (penalty scored); Simeunović (penalty scored) | 5–4 | (penalty scored) Jokanović; (penalty scored) Krčmarević; (penalty missed) Mijatović; (penalty scored) Gudelj; (penalty scored) Milošević |

Red Star Stadium, Belgrade
Attendance: 50,000
Referee: Zdravko Jokić (Belgrade)

1–1 on aggregate. Red Star won 5–4 on penalties.

== See also ==
- 1992–93 First League of FR Yugoslavia
- 1992–93 Second League of FR Yugoslavia
