= Goran Stojiljković (footballer) =

Serbian footballer (born 1970)

Personal information
- Full name: Goran Stojiljković
- Date of birth: December 14, 1970 (age 55)
- Place of birth: Leskovac, Yugoslavia
- Height: 1.77 m (5 ft 10 in)
- Position: Forward

Senior career*
Years	Team	Apps	(Gls)
1985–1987	Dubočica	18	(2)
1987–1994	Radnički Niš	151	(65)
1994–1995	Red Star Belgrade	17	(7)
1995–1996	Getafe	32	(15)
1996–1997	Mallorca	24	(4)
1997–1998	Leganés	27	(3)
1998–1999	Vojvodina	6	(0)
1999–2000	BV Cloppenburg	10	(1)
2000–2003	Radnički Niš	36	(27)
Total		321	(124)
- * Club domestic league appearances and goals

Goran Stojiljković (Serbian Cyrillic: Горан Стојиљковић; born 14 December 1970) is a Serbian retired footballer who played as a forward.

== Football career ==
After making his professional debuts with FK Radnički Niš at the age of 17, and remaining there for seven years, Stojiljković signed with Red Star Belgrade. In his only season with the capital side he was relatively used as the team won the double, scoring seven goals in the league.

In the 1995 summer Stojiljković moved abroad, joining Spanish second division club Getafe CF. He would spend the next two seasons in the same country and level, with as many teams, being relatively played as RCD Mallorca returned to La Liga in 1997; at the Balearic Islands outfit, he reunited with countryman – and former Red Star teammate – Jovan Stanković.

Subsequently, Stojiljković returned to his country, where he played for a further five years in representation of three teams until his retirement in 2003. This included a second spell with Radnički Niš.
