= Darko Kovačević =

Serbian footballer (born 1973)

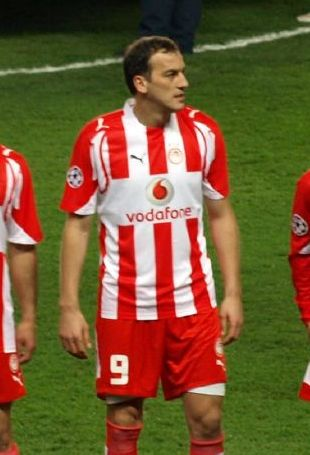
- Kovačević with Olympiacos in 2008

Personal information
- Date of birth: 18 November 1973 (age 52)
- Place of birth: Kovin, SR Serbia, Yugoslavia
- Height: 1.87 m (6 ft 2 in)
- Position: Striker

Youth career
- Radnički Kovin

Senior career*
Years	Team	Apps	(Gls)
1992–1994	Proleter Zrenjanin	63	(25)
1994–1995	Red Star Belgrade	47	(37)
1995–1996	Sheffield Wednesday	16	(4)
1996–1999	Real Sociedad	98	(41)
1999–2001	Juventus	47	(11)
2001	Lazio	7	(0)
2001–2007	Real Sociedad	163	(51)
2007–2009	Olympiacos	41	(21)
Total		482	(190)

International career
1994–2004	Serbia and Montenegro	59	(10)
- * Club domestic league appearances and goals

Darko Kovačević (Serbian Cyrillic: Дарко Ковачевић; born 18 November 1973) is a Serbian former professional footballer who played as a forward.

Kovačević began his career in his native country with Proleter Zrenjanin and subsequently played for Red Star Belgrade, with whom he won a Yugoslav League title and two Yugoslav Cups. His performances earned him a move to Premier League side Sheffield Wednesday, although his time in England was less successful. He is mainly known for his spells at Real Sociedad, where his offensive partnership with Nihat Kahveci was one of the best in Spain. Kovačević also had positive spells with Italian club Juventus and Greek side Olympiacos.

Internationally, Kovačević represented Yugoslavia at the 1998 FIFA World Cup and at the UEFA Euro 2000.

== Club career ==
=== Proleter and Red Star Belgrade ===
Beginning his career with his hometown club Radnički Kovin, he was soon spotted by Zrenjanin-based top league club Proleter Zrenjanin. Spending two seasons with the club, Kovačević managed over a goal every other game, and was signed by Serbian football club Red Star Belgrade. Kovačević won a Yugoslav League title and two Yugoslav Cups, earning a call-up to the Yugoslavia national team.

=== Sheffield Wednesday ===
Kovačević was then signed by Premier League club Sheffield Wednesday in December 1995, valued at £2.5m in a joint £4.5m transfer also involving Dejan Stefanovic. Kovačević's notable goals for The Owls were two against Bolton Wanderers at Hillsborough and an important finish versus Liverpool, also at home.

Kovačević played the remainder of the 1995/96 season, but his failure to adapt and settle into the UK way of life prompted a bid of £2.5m from Real Sociedad to be accepted. A sell-on clause in the transfer agreement ensured Sheffield Wednesday received a further £2.0m (taking the transfer to £4.5m) when Real Sociedad later sold him to Juventus.

=== Real Sociedad ===
Kovačević moved to La Liga side Real Sociedad in 1996. Larger clubs soon came calling, with Italian giants Juventus acquiring the big Serbian in the summer of 1999 for 33 billion lire (£12 million).

=== Juventus and Lazio ===
At Juventus, Kovačević found goals in both the Serie A and competitions such as the UEFA Champions League and UEFA Cup becoming their leading European goalscorer, and the top-scorer of the UEFA Cup during the 1999–2000 season, with 10 goals; despite facing competition from the club's starting attacking partnership of Filippo Inzaghi and Alessandro Del Piero, Kovačević made a total of 44 appearances in all competitions in his first season with the club (27 in Serie A, 3 in the Coppa Italia, and 11 in European competitions), scoring 21 goals in all competitions (eight in Serie A, two in the Coppa Italia, and 11 in European competitions, one of which came in Juventus's victorious UEFA Intertoto Cup campaign, which enabled them to qualify for the UEFA Cup).

The following season, due to the arrival of French striker David Trezeguet, Kovačević found less space in the squad under manager Carlo Ancelotti, making 27 appearances in all competitions (20 of which came in Serie A), mostly from the bench, and scoring only six goals (five in Serie A). The Juventus management felt Kovačević was underachieving, and soon both parties were looking for a move out of Italy, with clubs such as Rangers willing to offer £12m for his transfer. In 2001, Kovačević spent a brief time with Lazio (as part-swap deal with Marcelo Salas), making only seven appearances, before moving back to Spain in the middle of the season.

=== Return to Real Sociedad ===
In 2001, Kovačević returned to Real Sociedad, where he spent six more seasons at the club, netting 51 goals in his second spell with Sociedad. The 2006–07 season would be Kovačević's last season with the Spanish side, ending in the club's relegation. Alongside Jesús María Satrústegui, Kovačević is Real Sociedad's all-time top goalscorer in European club competitions, with 10 goals.

Kovačević scored 107 goals in his stages with Real Sociedad in nine seasons, with a total average of between eleven and twelve goals per season. They are only surpassed by Jesús María Satrústegui and López Ufarte in the txuri-urdin team. He is the most efficient foreigner that Real Sociedad has had in all its years of existence.

=== Olympiacos ===
In 2007, Kovačević signed with Greek champions Olympiacos. In early 2009, he was diagnosed with a blocked artery; he successfully underwent heart surgery to improve the flow of blood to his heart. His doctors advised to retire from football, and Kovačević officially retired in May 2009, playing a final friendly match for Olympiacos to celebrate the winning of the Greek domestic double. With Olympiacos, Kovačević won two Greek Super League titles, two Greek Cups and a Greek Super Cup.

== International career ==
On the national level, Kovačević made his debut for Serbia and Montenegro in a December 1994 friendly match away against Argentina, coming on as a 74th-minute substitute for Predrag Mijatović, and earned a total of 59 caps, scoring 10 goals. He would go on to compete in both UEFA Euro 2000 and the 1998 FIFA World Cup. His final international was a March 2004 friendly against Norway.

== Style of play ==
A quick and powerful striker, Kovačević was noted for his movement, technique, and goalscoring instinct. His key attributes were his strength and aerial ability.

== After retirement ==
After his retirement, Kovačević stated that he may take another role at his former team, Olympiacos. Kovačević and his family subsequently returned to Spain. However, Kovačević returned to Greece, as he loved the country and worked for several months as a columnist. In June 2010, the new president of Olympiacos, Evangelos Marinakis, hired Kovačević as a chief scout; he eventually became the sports director for the club. He remained in that position until 2018. He is the current sports director of the Serbian Football Association.

== Personal life ==
Kovačević has three children, Mia, Darko (Jr.) and Stella.

== Career statistics ==
=== Club ===
Appearances and goals by club, season and competition
Club	Season	League			Cup		Continental		Other		Total	
Club	Season	Division	Apps	Goals	Apps	Goals	Apps	Goals	Apps	Goals	Apps	Goals
Proleter Zrenjanin	1992–93	First League of FR Yugoslavia	32	6			—		—		32	6
Proleter Zrenjanin	1993–94	First League of FR Yugoslavia	31	19			—		—		31	19
Proleter Zrenjanin	Total		63	25			—		—		63	25
Red Star Belgrade	1994–95	First League of FR Yugoslavia	31	24			—		—		31	24
Red Star Belgrade	1995–96	First League of FR Yugoslavia	16	13			2	0	—		18	13
Red Star Belgrade	Total		47	37			2	0	—		49	37
Sheffield Wednesday	1995–96	Premier League	16	4	1	0	0	0	—		17	4
Real Sociedad	1996–97	La Liga	35	8	1	1	—		—		36	9
Real Sociedad	1997–98	La Liga	33	17	4	3	—		—		37	20
Real Sociedad	1998–99	La Liga	30	16	1	0	6	8	—		37	24
Real Sociedad	Total		98	41	6	4	6	8	—		110	53
Juventus	1999–2000	Serie A	26	6	4	3	14	11	—		44	20
Juventus	2000–01	Serie A	21	5	2	0	4	1	—		27	6
Juventus	Total		47	11	6	3	18	12	—		71	26
Lazio	2001–02	Serie A	7	0	1	0	3	0	—		11	0
Real Sociedad	2001–02	La Liga	19	8	0	0	—		—		19	8
Real Sociedad	2002–03	La Liga	36	20	1	0	—		—		37	20
Real Sociedad	2003–04	La Liga	36	8	0	0	7	2	—		43	10
Real Sociedad	2004–05	La Liga	30	8	2	1	—		—		32	9
Real Sociedad	2005–06	La Liga	9	4	0	0	—		—		9	4
Real Sociedad	2006–07	La Liga	33	3	1	0	—		—		34	3
Real Sociedad	Total		163	51	4	1	7	2	—		174	54
Olympiacos	2007–08	Super League Greece	27	17	4	4	8	3	—		39	24
Olympiacos	2008–09	Super League Greece	14	4	1	1	6	2	—		21	7
Olympiacos	Total		41	21	5	5	14	5	—		60	31
Career total			482	190	23	13	50	27	—		555	230

=== International ===
- Includes caps for FR Yugoslavia (1994–2002) and Serbia and Montenegro (2003–2004)

Appearances and goals by national team and year
National team	Year	Apps	Goals
FR Yugoslavia	1994	1	0
FR Yugoslavia	1995	6	3
FR Yugoslavia	1996	4	0
FR Yugoslavia	1997	4	0
FR Yugoslavia	1998	11	1
FR Yugoslavia	1999	6	1
FR Yugoslavia	2000	8	1
FR Yugoslavia	2001	4	0
FR Yugoslavia	2002	7	3
Serbia and Montenegro
Serbia and Montenegro	2003	7	1
Serbia and Montenegro	2004	1	0
Total		59	10

Scores and results list FR Yugoslavia/Serbia and Montenegro's goal tally first, score column indicates score after each Kovačević goal.

List of international goals scored by Darko Kovačević
No.	Date	Venue	Opponent	Score	Result	Competition
1	4 February 1995	Hong Kong Stadium, So Kon Po, Hong Kong	South Korea	1–0	1–0	1995 Lunar New Year Cup
2	8 April 1995	Estadio Tecnológico, Monterrey, Mexico	Mexico	1–0	4–1	Friendly
3	8 April 1995	Estadio Tecnológico, Monterrey, Mexico	Mexico	2–0	4–1	Friendly
4	29 May 1998	Red Star Stadium, Belgrade, FR Yugoslavia	Nigeria	3–0	3–0	Friendly
5	8 June 1999	Toumba Stadium, Thessaloniki, Greece	Malta	3–1	4–1	UEFA Euro 2000 qualifying
6	25 May 2000	Workers' Stadium, Beijing, China	China	2–0	2–0	Friendly
7	19 May 2002	Central Dynamo Stadium, Moscow, Russia	Russia	1–1	1–1	2002 LG Cup
8	21 August 2002	Sarajevo, Bosnia and Herzegovina	Bosnia and Herzegovina	2–0	2–0	Friendly
9	16 October 2002	Red Star Stadium, Belgrade, FR Yugoslavia	Finland	1–0	2–0	UEFA Euro 2004 qualifying
10	27 March 2003	Mladost Stadium, Kruševac, Serbia and Montenegro	Bulgaria	1–1	1–2	Friendly

== Honours ==
Red Star Belgrade

- First League of FR Yugoslavia: 1994–95
- FR Yugoslavia Cup: 1994–95, 1995–96

Juventus

- UEFA Intertoto Cup: 1999

Olympiacos

- Super League Greece: 2007–08, 2008–09
- Greek Cup: 2007–08, 2008–09
- Greek Super Cup: 2007

Individual

- UEFA Cup top scorer: 1998–99 (8 goals), 1999–2000 (10 goals)
- Super League Greece Best Foreign Player: 2007–08

== Notes ==
1. Known as FR Yugoslavia until 4 February 2003.
