= Yiannakis Yiangoudakis =

Cypriot footballer (born 1959)

Personal information
- Full name: Yiannakis Yiangoudakis
- Date of birth: January 17, 1959 (age 67)
- Place of birth: Limassol, Cyprus
- Position: Midfielder

Senior career*
Years	Team	Apps	(Gls)
1980–1995	Apollon Limassol	195	(16)
Total		195	(16)

International career
1980–1994	Cyprus	68	(1)

Managerial career
- 2005: Apollon Limassol
- * Club domestic league appearances and goals

Yiannakis Yiangoudakis (Greek: Γιαννάκης Γιαγκουδάκης) (born January 17, 1959) is a former Cyprus international football midfielder. During his career, he played in three international cups with Apollon Limassol. These include the 1991-92 European Cup, the 1993-94 UEFA Cup, and the 1994-95 UEFA Cup.
