= GFK Jasenica 1911 =

Jasenica
- Full name: GFK Jasenica 1911
- Founded: 1911; 115 years ago as PSK; 2005; 21 years ago (refounded as GFK Jasenica 1911)
- Dissolved: 2016
- Ground: Smederevska Palanka City Stadium
- Capacity: 3,000
- League: Podunavlje-Šumadija Zone League
- 2019–20: Podunavlje District League, 1st (promoted)

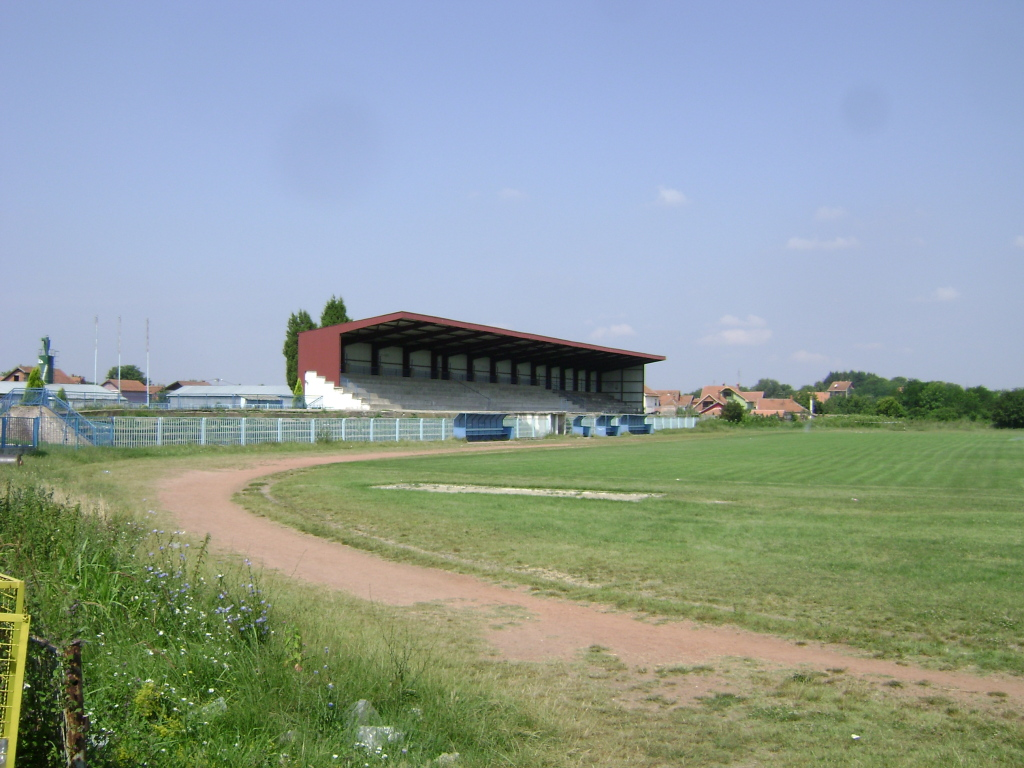
GFC Jasenica Stadium, Smederevska Palanka, Serbia.

GFK Jasenica 1911 (Serbian Cyrillic: ГФК Јасеница 1911) was a football club from Smederevska Palanka, Serbia.

== History ==
Founded on 3 September 1911, the club was originally called PSK (Palanački sport klub). The word "Jasenica" (after the river of the same name) was added to the name in 1922, making it PSK Jasenica. After the merger with Radnički in 1962, the club was renamed to Mladost. The club later became known as Mladost-Goša due to sponsorship reasons.

In 2005, the club was refounded as GFK Jasenica 1911 (Gradski fudbalski klub). Perica Ognjenović, a former player, became the honorary president of the club. In 2016 the municipality of Smederevska Palanka decided to close the club down and a new club was refounded in January 2017 as FK Jasenica 2017.

== Honours ==
Dunav Zone League

- 2010–11

== Coaching history ==
- Ljubiša Stamenković
