= 1994–95 FR Yugoslavia Cup =

Tournament details
- Country: Yugoslavia
- Teams: 32

Final positions
- Champions: Red Star
- Runners-up: Obilić

Tournament statistics
- Matches played: 45
- Goals scored: 134 (2.98 per match)

The 1994–95 FR Yugoslavia Cup was the third season of the FR Yugoslavia's annual football cup. The cup defenders was FK Partizan, but was defeated by Red Star Belgrade in the quarter-finals. Red Star Belgrade has the winner of the competition, after they defeated FK Obilić.

== First round ==
Team 1	Score	Team 2
Badnjevac (II)	0–2	Red Star
Obilić	2–1	Vojvodina
Bečej	w/o	Lovćen (?)
Proleter Zrenjanin	2–1	Mogren (II)
Partizan	3–0	Sutjeska
Borac Čačak	1–0	Hajduk Kula
Rudar Pljevlja	2–0	Jastrebac Niš (II)
Napredak Čestereg (?)	1–3	Napredak Kruševac
Agrounija Inđija (II)	1–4	Radnički Niš
OFK Kikinda (II)	0–2	Rad
Novi Sad (II)	4–1	OFK Beograd
Loznica	0–2	Zemun
Iskra Danilovgrad (II)	2–0	Sloboda Užice
Mladost Lučani (II)	1–0	Radnički Novi Beograd
Spartak Subotica	4–1	Novi Pazar (II)
ČSK Čelarevo (III)	0–1	Budućnost Podgorica

Note: Roman numerals in brackets denote the league tier the clubs participated in the 1994–95 season.

== Second round ==
Team 1	Agg.	Team 2	1st leg	2nd leg
Radnički Niš	2–4	Red Star	2–0	0–4
Spartak Subotica	3–3 (a)	Rudar Pljevlja	2–2	1–1
Budućnost Podgorica	1–2	Napredak Kruševac	1–0	0–2
Partizan	13–0	Iskra Danilovgrad (II)	10–0	3–0
Obilić	1–1 (4–3 p)	Rad	2–0	0–2
Bečej	7–1	Novi Sad (II)	6–1	1–0
Proleter Zrenjanin	4–4 (a)	Zemun	2–1	2–3
Borac Čačak	4–3	Mladost Lučani (II)	3–1	1–2

Note: Roman numerals in brackets denote the league tier the clubs participated in the 1994–95 season.

== Quarter-finals ==
Team 1	Agg.	Team 2	1st leg	2nd leg
Red Star	5–3	Partizan	2–0	3–3
Obilić	2–2 (a)	Borac Čačak	1–0	1–2
Proleter Zrenjanin	6–1	Napredak Kruševac	3–0	3–1
Rudar Pljevlja	3–4	Bečej	3–3	0–1

== Semi-finals ==
Team 1	Agg.	Team 2	1st leg	2nd leg
Red Star	4–1	Bečej	2–1	2–0
Proleter Zrenjanin	2–3	Obilić	1–1	1–2

== Final ==
=== First leg ===
10 May 1995

Obilić	0–4	Red Star
		Krupniković 22'; Živković 45'; Adžić 56'; Stojiljković 62'

FK Obilić Stadium, Belgrade
Attendance: 1,000
Referee: Radisav Rabrenović (Belgrade)

=== Second leg ===
17 May 1995

Red Star	0–0	Obilić

Red Star Stadium, Belgrade
Attendance: 5,000
Referee: Vaso Vujović (Cetinje)

Red Star won 4–0 on aggregate.

== See also ==
- 1994–95 First League of FR Yugoslavia
- 1994–95 Second League of FR Yugoslavia
