= Srđan Baljak =

Serbian footballer

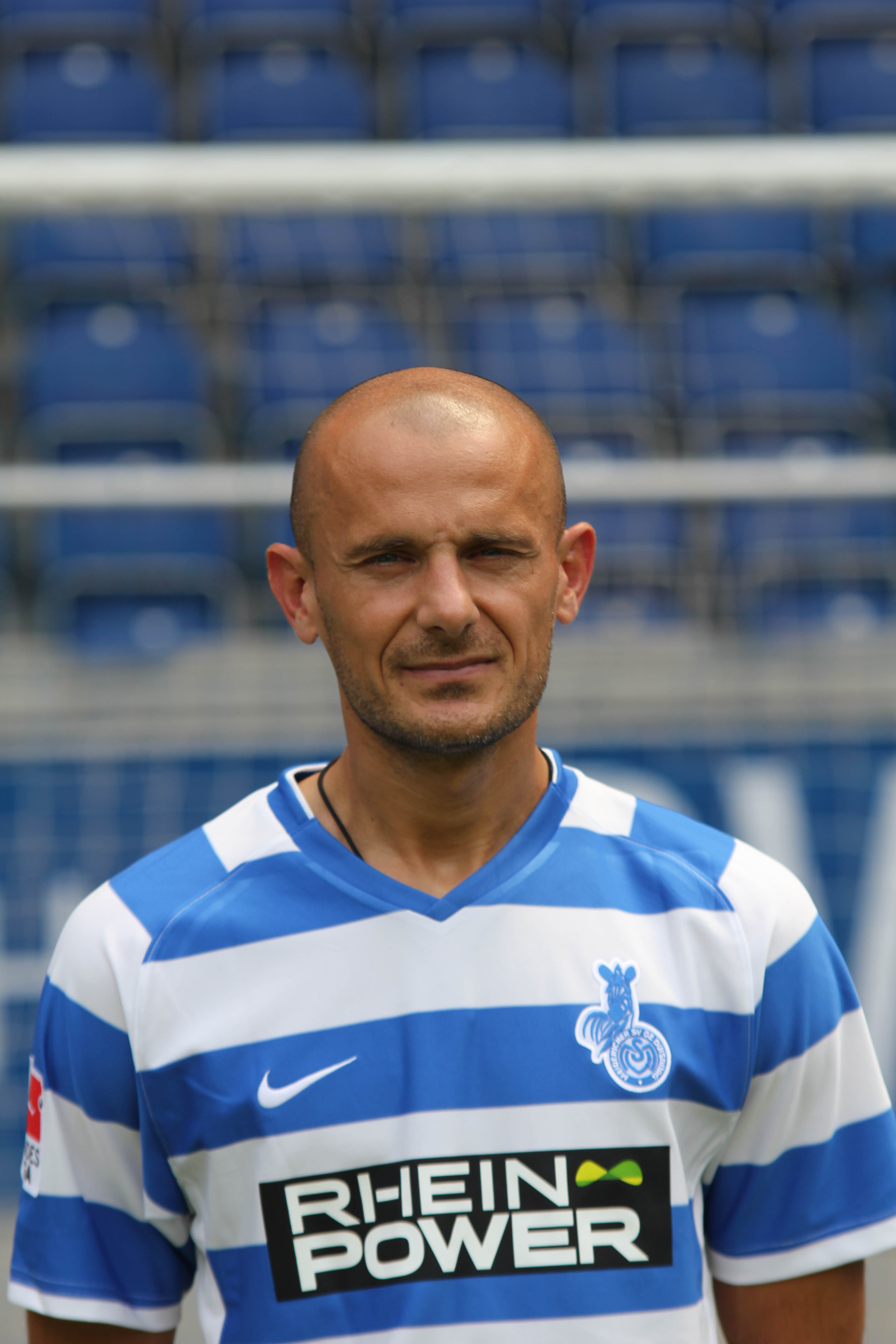
- Baljak with MSV Duisburg in 2012

Personal information
- Date of birth: 25 November 1978 (age 47)
- Place of birth: Sremska Mitrovica, SFR Yugoslavia
- Height: 1.79 m (5 ft 10 in)
- Position: Striker

Youth career
- Partizan

Senior career*
Years	Team	Apps	(Gls)
1997–2002	Partizan	1	(0)
1997–1999	→ Teleoptik (loan)	29	(9)
2000	→ Radnički Kragujevac (loan)	15	(0)
2000–2001	→ Teleoptik (loan)	34	(16)
2002	→ Budućnost Banatski Dvor (loan)	21	(20)
2002	Consadole Sapporo	13	(3)
2003–2006	Budućnost Banatski Dvor	66	(33)
2005	→ Olimpik Bakı (loan)	10	(3)
2006–2007	Banat Zrenjanin	30	(18)
2007–2009	Mainz 05	58	(17)
2010–2013	MSV Duisburg	73	(17)
2013–2014	Wormatia Worms	19	(1)
2014–2017	Schott Mainz	57	(19)
Total		426	(156)
- * Club domestic league appearances and goals

Srđan Baljak (Serbian Cyrillic: Срђан Баљак; born 25 November 1978) is a Serbian former professional footballer who played as a striker.

== Career ==
Born in Sremska Mitrovica, Baljak made his senior debut at Teleoptik, before being promoted to Partizan. He recorded one league appearance with the Crno-beli during the 1999–2000 season. Baljak also appeared as a substitute in a 0–1 away loss to Leeds United in the second leg of the 1999–2000 UEFA Cup first round. He was subsequently sent on a six-month loan to Radnički Kragujevac in the 2000 winter transfer window, but failed to make an impact.

In June 2002, Baljak moved abroad for the first time and signed with Japanese club Consadole Sapporo. He made 13 league appearances and scored three goals in the remainder of the 2002 campaign, but failed to help them avoid relegation from the top flight.

In the 2003 summer transfer window, Baljak returned to his homeland and rejoined Budućnost Banatski Dvor, after the club won promotion to the First League for the first time in its history. They eventually suffered relegation from the top flight in their debut season. Simultaneously, the club surprisingly reached the Serbia and Montenegro Cup final, thus securing a spot in the 2004–05 UEFA Cup.

While playing for Banat Zrenjanin, Baljak became the Serbian SuperLiga top scorer with 18 goals in the 2006–07 season, thus saving the club from relegation. He also helped the side reach the Serbian Cup semi-final that year, being eliminated by Vojvodina.

In June 2007, Baljak moved to Germany and signed with Mainz 05 on a three-year deal. He was their second-highest scorer in the 2008–09 2. Bundesliga with 11 goals, as they earned promotion to the Bundesliga. After making his debut in the top flight of German football, receiving limited playing time, Baljak was transferred to MSV Duisburg in January 2010. He was named the team's captain ahead of the 2010–11 campaign, leading the side to the DFB-Pokal final that season.

In July 2013, Baljak signed with Wormatia Worms on a free transfer. He left the club after only one season and joined Schott Mainz. In April 2017, it was revealed that Baljak would be retiring at the end of the season.

== Career statistics ==
Appearances and goals by club, season and competition
Club	Season	League		Cup		Continental		Total	
Club	Season	Apps	Goals	Apps	Goals	Apps	Goals	Apps	Goals
Partizan	1998–99	0	0	0	0	0	0	0	0
Partizan	1999–2000	1	0	0	0	1	0	2	0
Partizan	2000–01	0	0	0	0	0	0	0	0
Partizan	2001–02	0	0	0	0	0	0	0	0
Partizan	Total	1	0	0	0	1	0	2	0
Radnički Kragujevac (loan)	1999–2000	15	0	1	0	—		16	0
Consadole Sapporo	2002	13	3			—		13	3
Budućnost Banatski Dvor	2003–04	17	7			—		17	7
Budućnost Banatski Dvor	2004–05	38	24			2	0	40	24
Budućnost Banatski Dvor	2005–06	11	2	0	0	—		11	2
Budućnost Banatski Dvor	Total	66	33	0	0	2	0	68	33
Olimpik Bakı (loan)	2005–06	10	3			—		10	3
Banat Zrenjanin	2006–07	30	18	4	1	—		34	19
Mainz 05	2007–08	23	6	1	0	—		24	6
Mainz 05	2008–09	31	11	4	0	—		35	11
Mainz 05	2009–10	4	0	0	0	—		4	0
Mainz 05	Total	58	17	5	0	0	0	63	17
MSV Duisburg	2009–10	17	6	0	0	—		17	6
MSV Duisburg	2010–11	25	9	4	1	—		29	10
MSV Duisburg	2011–12	8	0	0	0	—		8	0
MSV Duisburg	2012–13	23	2	1	0	—		24	2
MSV Duisburg	Total	73	17	5	1	0	0	78	18
Wormatia Worms	2013–14	19	1	0	0	—		19	1
Schott Mainz	2014–15	20	6	0	0	—		20	6
Schott Mainz	2015–16	23	7	0	0	—		23	7
Schott Mainz	2016–17	14	6	0	0	—		14	6
Schott Mainz	Total	57	19	0	0	0	0	57	19
Career total		342	111	15	2	3	0	360	113

== Honours ==
Budućnost Banatski Dvor

- Second League of Serbia and Montenegro: 2004–05
- Serbia and Montenegro Cup runner-up: 2003–04

MSV Duisburg

- DFB-Pokal runner-up: 2010–11

Schott Mainz

- Oberliga Rheinland-Pfalz/Saar: 2016–17

Individual

- Serbian SuperLiga top scorer: 2006–07
