= FK Banat Zrenjanin =

Serbian football club

Banat Zrenjanin
- Full name: Fudbalski klub Banat Zrenjanin
- Founded: 2006; 20 years ago
- Dissolved: 2016
- Ground: Stadion Karađorđev park
- Capacity: 13,500
- 2015–16: Serbian League Vojvodina, 15th of 16 (relegated)
Home colours	Away colours

FK Banat Zrenjanin (Serbian Cyrillic: ФК Банат Зрењанин) was a football club based in Zrenjanin, Vojvodina, Serbia.

== History ==
The club was founded in June 2006 by the merger of Budućnost Banatski Dvor and Proleter Zrenjanin. They started competing in the Serbian SuperLiga in the competition's inaugural 2006–07 season, managing to avoid relegation. Moreover, the club's striker Srđan Baljak became the league's top scorer with 18 goals. They also reached the 2006–07 Serbian Cup semi-finals, being eliminated by Vojvodina. Later on, the club spent two more seasons in the top flight, before finishing bottom of the table in 2009 and suffering relegation to the Serbian First League. They also reached the 2008–09 Serbian Cup semi-finals, but were eliminated by eventual winners Partizan.

Between 2009 and 2013, the club competed in the second tier of Serbian football, but failed to make any notable results. They placed 15th out of 18 teams in the 2012–13 campaign and suffered relegated to the Serbian League Vojvodina. The club spent the next three years in the third tier, before finishing second from the bottom in the 2015–16 season, being relegated to the fourth tier. In August 2016, it was announced that they withdrew from the Vojvodina League East, eventually ceasing to exist.

== Seasons ==
Season	League									Cup
Season	Division	Pld	W	D	L	GF	GA	Pts	Pos	Cup
Serbia
2006–07	1	32	12	6	14	36	44	42	9th	Semi-finals
2007–08	1	33	6	10	17	34	57	28	11th	Quarter-finals
2008–09	1	33	7	10	16	21	40	31	12th	Semi-finals
2009–10	2	34	11	12	11	31	28	45	10th	Round of 16
2010–11	2	34	15	11	8	41	31	56	4th	Preliminary round
2011–12	2	34	9	14	11	35	41	41	13th	Round of 16
2012–13	2	34	9	8	17	29	47	35	15th	Preliminary round
2013–14	3 – Vojvodina	30	10	7	13	27	30	37	9th	Round of 32
2014–15	3 – Vojvodina	30	8	12	10	30	29	36	11th	—
2015–16	3 – Vojvodina	30	6	9	15	19	36	21 (Note: The club was docked six points.)	15th	—

== Notable players ==
This is a list of players who have played at full international level.

- (Bosnia and Herzegovina) Nenad Mišković
- (Burkina Faso) Issouf Compaoré
- (Montenegro) Filip Stojković
- (Montenegro) Goran Vujović
- (North Macedonia) Borče Manevski
- (North Macedonia) Milan Stojanoski
- (Serbia) Ognjen Ožegović
- (Serbia) Zoran Tošić
- (Serbia and Montenegro) Dejan Rađenović
- (Serbia and Montenegro) Saša Zorić

For a list of all FK Banat Zrenjanin players with a Wikipedia article, see Category:FK Banat Zrenjanin players.

== Managerial history ==
Period	Name
2006–2007	(Montenegro) Nikola Rakojević
2007	(Serbia) Petar Kurćubić
2007–2008	(Serbia) Žarko Soldo
2008	(Serbia) Ljubinko Drulović
2008	(Serbia) Vladimir Stević
2008	(Serbia) Saša Nikolić
2008–2009	(Serbia) Momčilo Raičević
2009	(Serbia) Žarko Soldo
2009–2010	(Serbia) Slavenko Kuzeljević

Period	Name
2011	(Serbia) Milan Budisavljević
2011	(Serbia) Danilo Bjelica
2011	(Serbia) Milan Budisavljević
2011–2012	(Serbia) Radivoje Drašković
2012	(Serbia) Miodrag Radanović
2012	(Bulgaria) Zoran Janković
2013	(Serbia) Dragan Lacmanović
2013	(Serbia) Jovo Simanić
2014–2016	(Serbia) Marko Guteša
