= Radivoje Drašković =

Serbian football manager and player

Personal information
- Date of birth: 6 May 1943 (age 83)
- Position: Defender

Youth career
- Radnički Jaša Tomić

Senior career*
Years	Team	Apps	(Gls)
1964–1975	Proleter Zrenjanin	270	(7)

Managerial career
- 1991–1993: Proleter Zrenjanin
- 1993: Kallithea
- 1996–1997: Proleter Zrenjanin
- 1997: Loznica
- 1998–1999: Proleter Zrenjanin
- 2004–2005: Budućnost Banatski Dvor
- 2011–2012: Banat Zrenjanin
- 2015–2016: Dolina Padina
- * Club domestic league appearances and goals

Radivoje Drašković (Serbian Cyrillic: Радивоје Драшковић; born 6 May 1943) is a Serbian former football manager and player.

== Playing career ==
After starting out at Radnički Jaša Tomić, Drašković spent most of his career with Proleter Zrenjanin, helping the club win promotion to the Yugoslav First League on two occasions, in 1967 and 1973. He amassed 270 league appearances and scored seven times for the club, including 111 games and two goals in the top flight of Yugoslav football.

== Managerial career ==
After hanging up his boots, Drašković was manager of Proleter Zrenjanin on several occasions. He also served as manager of Greek club Kallithea in the first part of the 1993–94 Beta Ethniki. Lastly, Drašković spent some time in charge of Banat Zrenjanin and Dolina Padina.

== Career statistics ==
Appearances and goals by club, season and competition
Club	Season	League		
Club	Season	Division	Apps	Goals
Proleter Zrenjanin	1964–65	Yugoslav Second League	6	0
Proleter Zrenjanin	1965–66	Yugoslav Second League	32	0
Proleter Zrenjanin	1966–67	Yugoslav Second League	27	2
Proleter Zrenjanin	1967–68	Yugoslav First League	25	0
Proleter Zrenjanin	1968–69	Yugoslav First League	33	1
Proleter Zrenjanin	1969–70	Yugoslav Second League	29	1
Proleter Zrenjanin	1970–71	Yugoslav Second League	15	1
Proleter Zrenjanin	1971–72	Yugoslav Second League	11	0
Proleter Zrenjanin	1972–73	Yugoslav Second League	27	1
Proleter Zrenjanin	1973–74	Yugoslav First League	28	1
Proleter Zrenjanin	1974–75	Yugoslav First League	25	0
Proleter Zrenjanin	1975–76	Yugoslav Second League	12	0
Proleter Zrenjanin	Total		270	7

== Honours ==
Proleter Zrenjanin

- Yugoslav Second League: 1966–67 (Group East), 1970–71 (Group North)
