= Nikola Beljić =

Serbian footballer

Personal information
- Full name: Nikola Beljić
- Date of birth: 14 May 1983 (age 43)
- Place of birth: Belgrade, SFR Yugoslavia
- Height: 1.73 m (5 ft 8 in)
- Position: Winger

Youth career
- Kolubara
- Red Star Belgrade

Senior career*
Years	Team	Apps	(Gls)
2002–2007	Red Star Belgrade	4	(0)
2002–2003	→ Budućnost Banatski Dvor (loan)	29	(1)
2003–2005	→ Jedinstvo Ub (loan)	53	(1)
2005–2006	→ Budućnost Banatski Dvor (loan)	12	(0)
2006–2007	→ Smederevo (loan)	26	(2)
2007–2010	OFK Beograd	79	(3)
2010–2011	Panserraikos	27	(3)
2011–2012	Atromitos	22	(0)
2012	→ Panthrakikos (loan)	10	(0)
2013–2014	Platanias	39	(2)
2014	Voždovac	11	(1)
2015	Xanthi	8	(0)
2015	Voždovac	6	(0)
2016	Acharnaikos	11	(1)
2016–2018	Zemun	46	(1)

International career
2004	Serbia and Montenegro U21	1	(0)
2010	Serbia	1	(0)
- * Club domestic league appearances and goals as of 20:55, 1 April 2021 (UTC)

Nikola Beljić (Serbian Cyrillic: Никола Бељић; born 14 May 1983) is a Serbian retired footballer who played as a winger.

== Club career ==
Beljić came through the youth system at Red Star Belgrade. He was later sent on loans to Budućnost Banatski Dvor, Jedinstvo Ub and Smederevo. In mid-2007, Beljić signed with OFK Beograd, spending the following three seasons there. He subsequently moved abroad and joined Greek club Panserraikos. In the following years, Beljić went on to play for numerous clubs in Greece and Serbia.

== International career ==
Beljić was capped once for Serbia, coming on as a substitute for Nemanja Tomić in a 3–0 away friendly win over Japan in April 2010.

== Honours ==
Red Star Belgrade

- First League of Serbia and Montenegro: 2003–04
- Serbia and Montenegro Cup: 2003–04
