= Dejan Ilić =

Serbian footballer

Dejan Ilić Дејан Илић
Personal information
- Full name: Dejan Ilić
- Date of birth: 24 March 1976 (age 50)
- Place of birth: Leskovac, SFR Yugoslavia
- Height: 1.79 m (5 ft 10 in)
- Position: Midfielder

Youth career
- Dubočica

Senior career*
Years	Team	Apps	(Gls)
1995–1997	Zemun	51	(0)
1997–2002	Red Star Belgrade	118	(7)
2002–2003	Zemun	25	(1)
2003	Obilić	13	(0)
2004	Red Star Belgrade	12	(0)
2004–2005	Istres	21	(0)
2006	Gorica	10	(0)
2007	Maccabi Tel Aviv	14	(2)
2008–2009	AEK Larnaca	12	(0)
Total		276	(10)
- * Club domestic league appearances and goals

Dejan Ilić (Serbian Cyrillic: Дејан Илић; born 24 March 1976) is a Serbian former footballer who played as a midfielder.

== Career ==
Ilić spent five and a half seasons with Red Star Belgrade over two spells between 1997 and 2004, winning three national championships (2000, 2001, and 2004) and three national cups (1999, 2000, and 2004).

In 2004, Ilić moved abroad to France and signed with Istres. He also played professionally in Slovenia (Gorica), Israel (Maccabi Tel Aviv), and Cyprus (AEK Larnaca).

== Honours ==
Red Star Belgrade

- First League of Serbia and Montenegro: 1999–2000, 2000–01, 2003–04
- Serbia and Montenegro Cup: 1998–99, 1999–2000, 2003–04
