= Omeragić =

Omeragić is a Slavic surname. Notable people with the surname include:

- Azer Omeragić (born 2002), Macedonian footballer
- Bećir Omeragić (born 2002), Swiss footballer
- Edin Omeragić (born 2002), Swiss footballer
- Kemal Omeragić (1931-2014), Macedonian football manager and former player
