= 1999–2000 FR Yugoslavia Cup =

Tournament details
- Country: Yugoslavia
- Teams: 32

Final positions
- Champions: Red Star
- Runners-up: Napredak Kruševac

Tournament statistics
- Matches played: 31
- Goals scored: 82 (2.65 per match)

The 1999–2000 FR Yugoslavia Cup was the seventh season of the FR Yugoslavia's annual football cup. The cup defenders was Red Star Belgrade, and they were him successfully defended, after they defeated FK Napredak Kruševac in the final.

== First round ==
Thirty-two teams entered in the First Round. The matches were played on 23, 24 and 25 November 1999.

Team 1	Score	Team 2
Železnik	3–2	ČSK Čelarevo (II)
Železničar Lajkovac (II)	2–3	Zemun
Vojvodina	2–1	Bečej (II)
Zeta (II)	2–2 (8–7 p)	Budućnost Podgorica
Partizan	4–2	Spartak Subotica
Borac Čačak	1–3	Milicionar
Čelik Nikšić (II)	1–1 (4–3 p)	Radnički Niš
Balkan Mirijevo (III)	2–1	Hajduk Kula
Bor (II)	0–3	Red Star
Napredak Kruševac (II)	3–1	Rad
OFK Kikinda (II)	0–0 (3–4 p)	Radnički Kragujevac
Čukarički	2–0	Proleter Zrenjanin
Sloboda Užice (II)	0–2	Sartid
Budućnost Banatski Dvor (III)	1–0	OFK Beograd
Obilić	3–1	Radnički Beograd (II)
Priština (x)	w/o	Mogren

Note: Roman numerals in brackets denote the league tier the clubs participated in the 1999–2000 season.

== Second round ==
The 16 winners from the prior round enter this round. The matches were played on 8 and 10 December 1999.

Team 1	Score	Team 2
Zeta (II)	1–2	Obilić
Napredak Kruševac (II)	2–0	Mogren
Sartid	0–3	Red Star
Budućnost Banatski Dvor (III)	1–1 (2–4 p)	Čelik Nikšić (II)
Radnički Kragujevac	1–0	Čukarički
Železnik	1–0	Vojvodina
Zemun	0–0 (4–3 p)	Partizan
Balkan Mirijevo (III)	0–2	Milicionar

Note: Roman numerals in brackets denote the league tier the clubs participated in the 1999–2000 season.

== Quarter-finals ==
The eight winners from the prior round enter this round. The matches were played on 5 April 2000.

Team 1	Score	Team 2
Red Star	1–0	Radnički Kragujevac
Milicionar	1–1 (5–4 p)	Obilić
Čelik Nikšić (II)	0–5	Zemun
Napredak Kruševac (II)	3–2 (3–1 p)	Železnik

Note: Roman numerals in brackets denote the league tier the clubs participated in the 1999–2000 season.

== Semi-finals ==
19 April 2000
16:30

Milicionar	0–3	Red Star
		Georgioski 7'; Lerinc 41'; Bošković 56'

SC MUP Makiš, Belgrade
Attendance: 6,000
Referee: Dušan Mrakić (Belgrade)
19 April 2000
16:30

Napredak Kruševac (II)	0–0	Zemun
Penalties
	5–4

Mladost Stadium, Kruševac
Attendance: 25,000
Referee: Milan Vidić (Užice)

Note: Roman numerals in brackets denote the league tier the clubs participated in the 1999–2000 season.

== Final ==
10 May 2000
18:00

Red Star	4–0	Napredak Kruševac (II)
Pjanović 13' (pen.), 38'; Ilić 55'; Vukomanović 58'	Report

Red Star Stadium, Belgrade
Attendance: 25,000
Referee: Sava Čokanica (Novi Sad)

Note: Roman numerals in brackets denote the league tier the clubs participated in the 1999–2000 season.

== See also ==
- 1999–2000 First League of FR Yugoslavia
- 1999–2000 Second League of FR Yugoslavia
