= 2003–04 First League of Serbia and Montenegro =

First League of Serbia and Montenegro
- Season: 2003–04
- Champions: Red Star; 24th domestic title
- Relegated: Budućnost (BD); Napredak Kruševac; Radnički Obrenovac; Kom
- Champions League: Red Star
- UEFA Cup: Partizan; Železnik; Budućnost (BD)
- Intertoto Cup: OFK Beograd; Sartid
- Matches: 240
- Goals: 584 (2.43 per match)
- Top goalscorer: Nikola Žigić (19)

The 2003–04 First League of Serbia and Montenegro was the second and first full season of the Serbia and Montenegro's top-level football league since its establishment. It was contested by 16 teams (13 from Serbia and 3 from Montenegro), and Red Star Belgrade won the championship.

== Teams ==
Rad, Čukarički, Javor Ivanjica, Rudar, Mogren and Radnički Niš were relegated to the 2003–04 Second League of Serbia and Montenegro.

The relegated teams were replaced by 2002–03 Second League of Serbia and Montenegro east, west, south and north champions Budućnost Banatski Dvor, Napredak Kruševac, Kom and Borac Čačak.

Location of teams in the 2003–04 First League

Club	City	Stadium	Capacity
Partizan	Belgrade	Partizan Stadium	32,710
Red Star	Belgrade	Red Star Stadium	55,538
Vojvodina	Novi Sad	Karađorđe Stadium	17,204
Zemun	Zemun, Belgrade	Zemun Stadium	10,000
Hajduk Kula	Kula	Stadion Hajduk	6,000
Obilić	Belgrade	FK Obilić Stadium	4,500
Železnik	Belgrade	Železnik Stadium	8,000
OFK Beograd	Karaburma, Belgrade	Omladinski Stadium	20,000
Sartid	Smederevo	Smederevo City Stadium	17,200
Sutjeska	Nikšić	Gradski stadion (Nikšić)	10,800
Zeta	Golubovci	Stadion Trešnjica	7,000
Radnički Obrenovac	Obrenovac	Stadion pored Kolubare	5,000
Budućnost	Banatski Dvor	Stadion Mirko Vučurević	4,000
Borac	Čačak	Čačak Stadium	6,000
Napredak	Kruševac	Stadion Mladost	10,811
Kom	Podgorica	Stadion Zlatica	3,000

== League table ==
Pos	Team	Pld	W	D	L	GF	GA	GD	Pts	Qualification or relegation
1	Red Star Belgrade (C)	30	23	5	2	59	13	+46	74	Qualification for Champions League second qualifying round
2	Partizan	30	19	6	5	48	20	+28	63	Qualification for UEFA Cup second qualifying round
3	Železnik	30	17	7	6	48	20	+28	58	Qualification for UEFA Cup second qualifying round
4	OFK Beograd	30	14	9	7	50	57	−7	51	Qualification for Intertoto Cup second round
5	Sartid	30	14	7	9	43	36	+7	49	Qualification for Intertoto Cup first round
6	Obilić	30	14	4	12	42	29	+13	46	
7	Zemun	30	11	8	11	27	29	−2	41	
8	Sutjeska	30	12	4	14	38	36	+2	40	
9	Vojvodina	30	10	10	10	33	33	0	40	
10	Hajduk Kula	30	11	5	14	28	29	−1	38	
11	Zeta	30	10	6	14	38	41	−3	36	
12	Borac Čačak	30	8	11	11	30	41	−11	35	
13	Budućnost Banatski Dvor (R)	30	10	4	16	30	49	−19	34	UEFA Cup qualifying and relegation to Second League (Note: Budućnost Banatski Dvor qualified for 2004–05 UEFA Cup as runner-up of 2003–04 Serbia and Montenegro Cup.)
14	Napredak Kruševac (R)	30	7	4	19	28	46	−18	25	Relegation to Serbian Second League
15	Radnički Obrenovac (R)	30	4	12	14	18	47	−29	24	Relegation to Serbian Second League
16	Kom (R)	30	4	2	24	21	67	−46	14	Relegation to Montenegrin First League

Source: RSSSF.org
Rules for classification: 1) points; 2) goal difference; 3) number of goals scored.
(C) Champions; (R) Relegated

== Results ==
Home \ Away	BOR	BBD	HAJ	KOM	NAP	OBI	OFK	PAR	ROB	RSB	SAR	SUT	VOJ	ŽEL	ZEM	ZET
Borac Čačak		2–0	1–0	4–0	2–1	1–0	1–2	0–1	2–2	1–1	0–0	0–2	0–0	2–2	0–0	1–1
Budućnost Banatski Dvor	0–0		2–1	2–1	2–1	0–2	1–1	1–0	3–0	0–2	0–0	2–4	3–1	0–2	1–2	3–1
Hajduk Kula	2–0	2–0		3–1	0–1	0–3	1–1	0–0	1–1	1–2	0–2	1–0	0–1	1–0	3–1	2–1
Kom	3–3	1–4	1–3		1–2	0–3	0–1	0–0	1–0	0–2	1–0	1–2	2–4	0–2	0–1	1–2
Napredak Kruševac	2–1	0–1	0–2	0–1		0–3	1–1	0–1	0–0	2–1	0–1	2–1	3–4	1–1	1–0	4–2
Obilić	0–1	3–0	0–2	3–1	2–1		3–0	2–1	3–0	1–3	2–4	1–1	2–1	0–1	3–0	2–0
OFK Beograd	0–0	2–1	1–0	2–0	2–1	1–0		1–1	1–0	1–0	2–4	3–2	0–1	1–0	1–0	1–0
Partizan	6–1	3–0	1–0	6–2	1–0	2–0	3–2		3–1	0–0	1–0	3–0	2–1	0–2	0–0	3–0
Radnički Obrenovac	0–0	1–0	1–2	1–0	0–0	0–0	1–1	0–3		0–0	3–1	0–3	1–1	1–2	0–0	3–2
Red Star	5–1	4–0	2–0	2–0	2–0	2–0	2–1	3–0	3–0		1–0	1–0	3–0	0–0	2–1	4–0
Sartid	1–0	5–1	1–0	3–0	3–2	3–1	1–1	2–1	2–0	3–5		3–2	1–0	0–0	0–0	0–0
Sutjeska	4–1	1–0	1–1	0–1	2–1	0–0	2–1	0–1	0–0	0–1	2–1		1–0	3–1	0–1	2–0
Vojvodina	1–2	1–0	0–0	4–2	1–0	1–0	0–0	0–0	5–0	0–2	2–2	2–1		0–3	0–0	0–0
Železnik	2–0	5–1	1–0	3–0	2–1	0–0	1–1	0–1	4–0	0–2	2–0	3–0	2–2		4–2	2–0
Zemun	2–1	1–2	1–0	1–0	1–0	3–2	2–3	1–2	0–0	0–1	3–0	2–1	0–0	0–1		1–0
Zeta	1–2	0–0	2–0	4–0	5–1	0–1	2–1	1–2	4–2	1–1	4–0	2–1	1–0	1–0	1–1	

Source: Soccerway
Legend: Blue = home team win; Yellow = draw; Red = away team win.

== Winning squad ==
Champions: Red Star Belgrade (Coach: Slavoljub Muslin)

Players (league matches/league goals)

- (Serbia and Montenegro) Dušan Basta
- (Serbia and Montenegro) Nikola Beljić
- (Serbia and Montenegro) Dragan Bogavac
- (Bosnia and Herzegovina) Jadranko Bogičević
- (Serbia and Montenegro) Branko Bošković
- (Serbia and Montenegro) Nemanja Vidić
- (Serbia and Montenegro) Milivoje Vitakić
- (Serbia and Montenegro) Vladimir Dišljenković (goalkeeper)
- (Serbia and Montenegro) Ivan Dudić
- (Serbia and Montenegro) Milan Dudić
- (Sweden) Bojan Djordjic
- (Serbia and Montenegro) Slavoljub Đorđević
- (Serbia and Montenegro) Nikola Žigić
- (Serbia and Montenegro) Dejan Ilić
- (Serbia and Montenegro) Boško Janković
- (Serbia and Montenegro) Nenad Kovačević
- (Serbia and Montenegro) Radovan Krivokapić
- (Serbia and Montenegro) Marjan Marković
- (Serbia and Montenegro) Bojan Miladinović
- (Serbia and Montenegro) Dejan Milovanović
- (Serbia and Montenegro) Dragan Mladenović
- (Serbia and Montenegro) Dragan Mrđa
- (France) Marko Muslin
- (Serbia and Montenegro) Sanibal Orahovac
- (Serbia and Montenegro) Marko Pantelić
- (Serbia and Montenegro) Marko Perović
- (Serbia and Montenegro) Ivan Ranđelović (goalkeeper)
- (Serbia and Montenegro) Nenad Stojanović
- (Serbia and Montenegro) Dragan Šarac

== Top goalscorers ==
Rank	Player	Club	Goals
1	(Serbia and Montenegro) Nikola Žigić	Red Star	19
2	(Serbia and Montenegro) Nenad Mirosavljević	Sartid	14
3	(Serbia and Montenegro) Marko Pantelić	Sartid/Red Star	13
3	(Serbia and Montenegro) Dušan Đokić	Obilić	13
3	(Serbia and Montenegro) Nikola Nikezić	Sutjeska	13
6	(Serbia and Montenegro) Zoran Đurašković	Železnik	12
7	(Serbia and Montenegro) Milan Belić	Vojvodina	11
8	(Serbia and Montenegro) Borislav Mikić	Železnik	10
9	(Serbia and Montenegro) Andrija Delibašić	Partizan	9
9	(Serbia and Montenegro) Ardijan Đokaj	Obilić	9
9	(Serbia and Montenegro) Dražen Milić	Zeta	9
