= 2022 FC Tobol season =

FC Tobol
2022 season
- Chairman: Nikolay Panin
- Manager: Alexander Moskalenko (Caretaker) (until 16 May); Milan Milanović (from 20 May)
- Stadium: Central Stadium
- Premier League: 3rd
- Kazakhstan Cup: Group stage
- Super Cup: Winners
- Champions League: First qualifying round vs Ferencváros
- Europa Conference League: Third qualifying round vs Zrinjski Mostar
- Top goalscorer: League: Igor Sergeyev (9); All: Igor Sergeyev (12)
- Highest home attendance: 8,420 vs Ferencváros (6 July 2022)
- Lowest home attendance: 1,200 vs Taraz (7 August 2022)
- Average home league attendance: 2,959 (15 October 2022)
Home colours	Away colours

The 2022 FC Tobol season was the 24th successive season that the club played in the Kazakhstan Premier League, the highest tier of association football in Kazakhstan. Tobol finished the season in third place, qualifying for the 2023–24 UEFA Europa Conference League. Tobol also participated in the Kazakhstan Cup where they finished bottom of their group, won the Super Cup against Kairat, and were knocked out of the UEFA Champions League by Ferencváros in the First Qualifying Round and then the Europa Conference League at the Third Qualifying Round by Zrinjski Mostar.

== Season events ==
On 27 January, Tobol announced the free-agent signings of Dmytro Nepohodov and Žarko Tomašević after they'd previously left Astana, and the signing of Aybar Zhaksylykov from Zhetysu.

On 25 April, Tobol announced the loan signing of Rudi Požeg Vancaš from Chornomorets Odesa.

On 16 May, Caretaker Head Coach Alexander Moskalenko left his role by mutual consent, with Milan Milanović being appointed as the clubs new Head Coach on 20 May.

On 9 June, Tobol announced the departure of Dmitry Miroshnichenko by mutual agreement. Six days later, 15 June, Tobol announced the departure of Dmytro Nepohodov by mutual agreement.

On 23 June, Tobol announced the signing of Timur Akmurzin from Spartak Moscow on a contract until the end of the season.

On 28 June, Tobol announced the signing of Serges Déblé from Pyunik on a one-year contract.

On 30 June, Tobol confirmed that Rudi Požeg Vancaš had returned to Chornomorets Odesa after his loan ended.

On 2 July, Tobol announced the signing of Miljan Vukadinović from Vojvodina on a contract until the end of 2023.

On 21 July, Tobol announced the departure of Rúben Brígido by mutual agreement.

== Squad ==
As of match played 6 November 2022

No.	Name	Nationality	Position	Date of birth (age)	Signed from	Signed in	Contract ends	Apps.	Goals
Goalkeepers
12	Sultan Busurmanov	(Kazakhstan)	GK	10 May 1996 (aged 26)	Academy	2015		19	0
27	Vladimir Shpakovsky	(Kazakhstan)	GK	1 January 2001 (aged 21)	Academy	2021		4	0
28	Yuri Melikhov	(Kazakhstan)	GK	1 September 2003 (aged 19)	Academy	2021		0	0
35	Aleksandr Mokin	(Kazakhstan)	GK	19 June 1981 (aged 41)	Atyrau	2020		68	0
88	Timur Akmurzin	(Russia)	GK	7 December 1997 (aged 24)	Spartak Moscow	2022	2022	14	0
Defenders
3	Roman Asrankulov	(Kazakhstan)	DF	30 July 1999 (aged 23)	Academy	2018		36	3
5	Daniyar Semchenkov	(Kazakhstan)	DF	12 February 1997 (aged 25)	Academy	2019		16	0
22	Aleksandr Marochkin	(Kazakhstan)	DF	14 February 1990 (aged 32)	Kaisar	2020		62	1
24	Bagdat Kairov	(Kazakhstan)	DF	27 April 1993 (aged 29)	Ordabasy	2021		45	0
25	Serhiy Malyi	(Kazakhstan)	DF	5 June 1990 (aged 32)	Astana	2020		92	13
32	Dmitriy Panov	(Kazakhstan)	DF	7 December 2001 (aged 20)	Academy	2021		6	0
33	Žarko Tomašević	(Montenegro)	DF	22 February 1990 (aged 32)	Astana	2022		28	2
34	Asan Bitekenov	(Kazakhstan)	DF	7 October 2003 (aged 19)	Academy	2022		1	0
36	Aleksandr Krytsa	(Kazakhstan)	DF	15 August 2002 (aged 20)	Academy	2021		4	0
37	Arman Tungushbaev	(Kazakhstan)	DF	6 December 2001 (aged 20)	Academy	2021		5	0
42	Evgeniy Kochetkov	(Kazakhstan)	DF	29 January 2004 (aged 18)	Academy	2022		1	0
45	Aleksa Amanović	(North Macedonia)	DF	24 October 1996 (aged 26)	Javor Ivanjica	2020	2021	82	4
48	Marat Alpispaev	(Kazakhstan)	DF	8 April 2002 (aged 20)	Academy	2021		8	0
49	Andrey Drobyshev	(Kazakhstan)	DF	3 May 2000 (aged 22)	Academy	2021		1	0
53	Bekzat Minaydarov	(Kazakhstan)	DF	21 January 2003 (aged 19)	Academy	2022		2	0
Midfielders
8	Askhat Tagybergen	(Kazakhstan)	MF	9 August 1990 (aged 32)	Kaisar	2021		65	16
10	Serikzhan Muzhikov	(Kazakhstan)	MF	17 June 1989 (aged 33)	Astana	2020		64	10
11	Zoran Tošić	(Serbia)	MF	28 April 1987 (aged 35)	Taizhou Yuanda	2021		47	11
14	Samat Zharynbetov	(Kazakhstan)	MF	4 January 1994 (aged 28)	Ekibastuz	2017		127	4
17	Vladislav Vasilyev	(Kazakhstan)	MF	10 April 1997 (aged 25)	Energetik-BGU Minsk	2022		27	1
20	Zhaslan Zhumashev	(Kazakhstan)	MF	27 September 2001 (aged 21)	Academy	2020		23	2
21	Miljan Vukadinović	(Serbia)	MF	27 December 1992 (aged 29)	Vojvodina	2022		14	1
29	Dušan Jovančić	(Serbia)	MF	19 October 1990 (aged 32)	Çaykur Rizespor	2021	2022	61	4
31	Toktar Baydavletov	(Kazakhstan)	MF	23 February 2004 (aged 18)	Academy	2022		4	0
34	Alsaid Akhmetzhanov	(Kazakhstan)	MF	9 August 2000 (aged 22)	Academy	2021		1	0
40	Timur Igubaev	(Kazakhstan)	MF	27 September 2003 (aged 19)	Academy	2022		1	0
41	Daniil Dubrovin	(Kazakhstan)	MF	11 July 2002 (aged 20)	Academy	2022		3	0
46	Ali Abdibek	(Kazakhstan)	MF	23 June 2003 (aged 19)	Academy	2021		2	0
47	Vyacheslav Kulpeisov	(Kazakhstan)	MF	24 December 2001 (aged 20)	Academy	2021		9	0
50	Bekzat Zhaparov	(Kazakhstan)	MF	5 March 2002 (aged 20)	Academy	2021		6	0
51	Beybit Galym	(Kazakhstan)	MF	25 October 2004 (aged 18)	Academy	2022		2	0
52	Nurbek Bayzhanov	(Kazakhstan)	MF	4 April 2003 (aged 19)	Academy	2021		6	0
54	Matvey Tsoy	(Kazakhstan)	MF	9 November 2004 (aged 17)	Academy	2022		1	0
57	Nurali Zhaksylykov	(Kazakhstan)	MF	4 November 2004 (aged 18)	Academy	2022		2	1
93	Chidi Osuchukwu	(Nigeria)	MF	11 August 1993 (aged 29)	Turan	2022		10	1
Forwards
30	Farid Shaymerdenov	(Kazakhstan)	FW	15 January 2000 (aged 22)	Academy	2021		1	0
39	Bekzat Yermekbaev	(Kazakhstan)	FW	6 December 2001 (aged 20)	Academy	2022		6	1
43	Dias Nurkanov	(Kazakhstan)	FW	14 November 2003 (aged 18)	Academy	2022		4	0
44	Aybar Zhaksylykov	(Kazakhstan)	FW	24 July 1997 (aged 25)	Zhetysu	2022		32	7
55	Ali Akhmet	(Kazakhstan)	FW	13 February 2003 (aged 19)	Academy	2021		7	0
77	Igor Sergeev	(Uzbekistan)	FW	30 April 1993 (aged 29)	Aktobe	2021		51	22
89	Serges Déblé	(Ivory Coast)	FW	1 October 1989 (aged 33)	Pyunik	2022	2023	16	4
Players away on loan
Left during the season
7	Dmitri Miroshnichenko	(Kazakhstan)	DF	26 February 1992 (aged 30)	Aktobe	2016		161	6
18	Rúben Brígido	(Portugal)	MF	23 June 1991 (aged 31)	Ordabasy	2021		35	1
23	Dmytro Nepohodov	(Kazakhstan)	GK	17 February 1988 (aged 34)	Unattached	2022	2022	70	0
94	Rudi Požeg Vancaš	(Slovenia)	MF	15 March 1994 (aged 28)	on loan from Chornomorets Odesa	2022	2022	6	1

== Transfers ==
=== In ===
Date	Position	Nationality	Name	From	Fee	Ref.
27 January 2022	GK	(Kazakhstan)	Dmytro Nepohodov	Unattached	Free	
27 January 2022	DF	(Montenegro)	Žarko Tomašević	Unattached	Free	
27 January 2022	FW	(Kazakhstan)	Aybar Zhaksylykov	Zhetysu	Undisclosed	
9 February 2022	MF	(Kazakhstan)	Vladislav Vasilyev	Energetik-BGU Minsk	Undisclosed	
23 June 2022	GK	(Russia)	Timur Akmurzin	Spartak Moscow	Undisclosed	
28 June 2022	FW	(Ivory Coast)	Serges Déblé	Pyunik	Undisclosed	
2 July 2022	MF	(Serbia)	Miljan Vukadinović	Vojvodina	Undisclosed	
20 July 2022	MF	(Nigeria)	Chidi Osuchukwu	Turan	Undisclosed	

=== Loans in ===
Date from	Position	Nationality	Name	From	Date to	Ref.
25 April 2022	MF	(Slovenia)	Rudi Požeg Vancaš	Chornomorets Odesa	30 June 2022	

=== Released ===
Date	Position	Nationality	Name	Joined	Date	Ref.
2 January 2022	MF	(Kazakhstan)	Azat Nurgaliyev	Turan	14 January 2022	
9 June 2022	DF	(Kazakhstan)	Dmitry Miroshnichenko	Chernomorets Novorossiysk		
15 June 2022	GK	(Kazakhstan)	Dmytro Nepohodov	Chornomorets Odesa		
21 July 2022	MF	(Portugal)	Rúben Brígido	Caspiy		

== Friendlies ==
2022	–
(UTC+6)

== Competitions ==
=== Overview ===
Competition	First match	Last match	Starting round	Final position	Record							
Competition	First match	Last match	Starting round	Final position	Pld	W	D	L	GF	GA	GD	Win %
Premier League	6 March 2022	6 November 2022	Matchday 1	3rd	26	14	5	7	46	33	+13	53.85
Kazakhstan Cup	9 July 2022	14 August 2022	Group Stage	Group Stage	6	1	0	5	7	18	−11	16.67
Super Cup	2 March 2022		Final	Winners	1	1	0	0	2	1	+1	100.00
UEFA Champions League	6 July 2022	14 July 2022	Second Qualifying Round	Second Qualifying Round	2	0	1	1	1	5	−4	0.00
UEFA Europa Conference League	21 July 2022	11 August 2022	Second Qualifying Round	Third Qualifying Round	4	2	1	1	4	2	+2	50.00
Total					39	18	7	14	60	59	+1	46.15

Last updated: 6 November 2022
Source: Competitions

=== Super Cup ===
2 March 2022	Tobol	2 – 1	Kairat	Nur-Sultan
19:30 (UTC+6)	Muzhikov 30' (pen.) (yellow card) 79'; Jovančić (yellow card) 60'; Zhaksylykov 83'	Report	Paulo 39'; Seydakhmet (yellow card) 60'	Stadium: Astana Arena; Attendance: 6,000; Referee: Daniyar Sakhi

=== Premier League ===
==== Results summary ====
Overall								Home						Away					
Pld	W	D	L	GF	GA	GD	Pts	W	D	L	GF	GA	GD	W	D	L	GF	GA	GD
26	14	5	7	46	33	+13	47	9	3	1	26	10	+16	5	2	6	20	23	−3

Last updated: 6 November 2022.
Source: See Results

==== Results by round ====
Round	1	2	3	4	5	6	7	8	9	10	11	12	13	14	15	16	17	18	19	20	21	22	23	24	25	26
Ground	H	A	H	H	A	H	A	H	A	H	A	H	H	A	A	H	H	A	H	A	H	A	H	A	A	A
Result	W	D	W	W	L	D	L	D	L	W	L	W	W	W	D	D	W	W	L	W	W	L	W	L	W	W
Position																										

Source: See Results
A = Away; H = Home; W = Win; D = Draw; L = Loss

==== Results ====
6 March 2022 1	Tobol	1–0	Akzhayik	Kostanay
17:00 (UTC+6)	Malyi (yellow card) 16'; Sergeyev 79'; Zharynbetov (yellow card) 81'	Report	Sapanov (yellow card) 90'	Stadium: Central Stadium; Attendance: 1,500; Referee: Rustam Omarov

11 March 2022 2	Caspiy	0–0	Tobol	Aktau
15:00 (UTC+6)	Tigroudja (yellow card) 20'; Nurgaliyev (yellow card) 39'; Ardazishvili (yellow card) 65'; Teles (yellow card) 69'	Report	Tošić (yellow card) 39'; Kairov (yellow card) 84'; Jovančić (yellow card) 90+7'	Stadium: Zhastar Stadium; Attendance: 2,500; Referee: Alexander Gauzer

17 March 2022 3	Tobol	2–0	Kyzylzhar	Kostanay
19:00 (UTC+6)	Tošić 32'; Tomašević (yellow card) 34'; Amanović (yellow card) 34'; Tagybergen 73' (pen.); Brígido (yellow card) 88'	Report	Murachyov (yellow card) 44'; Dovbnya (yellow card) 45+2'; Yesimov (yellow card) 62'; Gian (yellow card) 80'; Zorić (yellow card) 90'	Stadium: Central Stadium; Attendance: 1,500; Referee: Alexander Zatula

4 April 2022 4	Tobol	3–0	Turan	Kostanay
19:00 (UTC+6)	Tošić 19' (pen.); Jovančić (yellow card) 31'; Tagybergen 49', 55' (yellow card) 61'	Report	Fedin (yellow card) 10'	Stadium: Central Stadium; Attendance: 1,700; Referee: Saken Bayimbet

9 April 2022 5	Ordabasy	3–1	Tobol	Shymkent
17:00 (UTC+6)	Astanov 22' (pen.); Nyuiadzi 44', 85'; Dobay (yellow card) 54'	Report	Marochkin (red card) 21'; Sergeyev 41'; Kairov (yellow card) 65'; Tagybergen (yellow card) 79'; Jovančić (yellow card) 86'; Zharynbetov (yellow card) 87'; Zhaksylykov (yellow card) 89'	Stadium: Kazhymukan Munaitpasov Stadium; Attendance: 3,500; Referee: Bagdat Abdullaev

16 April 2022 6	Tobol	2–2	Kairat	Kostanay
20:00 (UTC+6)	Tagybergen (penalty missed) 34'; Malyi 45+2'; Tošić 72'	Report	Kanté 8'; Jaloliddinov (yellow card) 45+1'; Seydakhmet (yellow card) 84'; A.Buranchiev (red card) 90+5'; Vasilyev 90+7' (o.g.)	Stadium: Central Stadium; Attendance: 3,000; Referee: Artem Kuchin

22 April 2022 7	Atyrau	2–1	Tobol	Atyrau
17:00 (UTC+6)	Filipović 66' (pen.), 83'	Report	Sergeyev 77'	Stadium: Munaishy Stadium; Attendance: 3,580; Referee: Sergey Nozhenko

26 April 2022 8	Tobol	1–1	Astana	Kostanay
20:00 (UTC+6)	Tomašević 32'; Jovančić (yellow card) 79'; Zhaksylykov (yellow card) 86'; Tošić (yellow card) 90+3'; Amanović (yellow card) 90+6'	Report	Tomasov (yellow card) 8'; Milošević (yellow card) 45+4'; T.Kusyapov (yellow card) 48'; Eugénio 54'; Beskorovaynyi (yellow card) 67'; Manzorro (yellow card) 90+6'	Stadium: Central Stadium; Attendance: 3,000; Referee: Elvira Nurmustafina

2 May 2022 9	Shakhter Karagandy	4–1	Tobol	Karaganda
17:00 (UTC+6)	Sviridov (yellow card) 21'; Dosmagambetov 33' (pen.), 62' (pen.); Kovtalyuk 47'; Bukorac (yellow card) 55'; Nazimkhanov (yellow card) 59'; Murtazayev 81'	Report	Tomašević (yellow card) 5'; Amanović (yellow card) 12' (yellow-red card) 31'; Tošić (yellow card) 52'; Tagybergen (yellow card) 60'; Zhaksylykov 70'; Brígido (yellow card) 73'	Stadium: Shakhter Stadium; Attendance: 3,000; Referee: Sergey Gorohovodatsky

7 May 2022 10	Tobol	2–0	Aksu	Kostanay
20:00 (UTC+6)	Tošić 12'; Tagybergen 73'	Report	Bachek (yellow card) 20'; Zhilov (yellow card) 25'; Smailov (yellow card) 85'	Stadium: Central Stadium; Attendance: 2,000; Referee: Daniyar Sakhi

14 May 2022 11	Aktobe	2–1	Tobol	Aktobe
20:00 (UTC+6)	Shomko (yellow card) 41'; Kenesov (red card) 45+2'; Serderov 54'; Kybyrai (yellow card) 90+6'; Gohou 90+12'	Report	Tagybergen (yellow card) 31'; Tomašević (yellow card) 45+2'; Amanović 79'; Jovančić (yellow card) 90+8'	Stadium: Central Stadium; Attendance: 11,800; Referee: Aidyn Rakhimbaev

22 May 2022 12	Tobol	4–2	Maktaaral	Kostanay
17:00 (UTC+6)	Sergeyev 47', 68'; Brígido 55'; Kairov (yellow card) 70'; Malyi 88'	Report	Yudenkov 60'; Karimov 76'	Stadium: Central Stadium; Attendance: 2,000; Referee: Timur Kumashev

19 June 2022 14	Tobol	1–0	Caspiy	Kostanay
21:00 (UTC+6)	Sergeyev 6'; Tošić (penalty missed) 45+4'	Report	Taykenov (penalty missed) 81'	Stadium: Central Stadium; Attendance: 5,000; Referee: Saken Baimbet

26 June 2022 15	Kyzylzhar	1–3	Tobol	Petropavl
17:00 (UTC+6)	Gian 24'; Muldinov (yellow card) 26'	Report	Vancaš 8'; Amanović (yellow card) 33'; Tagybergen (yellow card) 43' (goal) 81'; Jovančić 64' (pen.); Tomašević (yellow card) 49'	Stadium: Karasai Stadium; Attendance: 6,000; Referee: Daniyar Sakhi

1 July 2022 16	Turan	2–2	Tobol	Turkistan
21:00 (UTC+6)	Satanov (yellow card) 16'; Abzalov (yellow card) 57' (goal) 60'; Fazli (yellow card) 79'; Osuchukwu 83'; Taipov (yellow card) 86'	Report	Kairov (yellow card) 30'; Jovančić (yellow card) 50' (goal) 90+10' (pen.); Malyi 87'; Tošić (yellow card) 90+6'	Stadium: Turkistan Arena; Attendance: 1,500; Referee: Elvira Nurmustafina

21 August 2022 13	Tobol	2–2	Taraz	Kostanay
19:00 (UTC+6)	Tagybergen 15'; Osuchukwu 24'; Vasilyev (yellow card) 88'	Report	Karaman 20'; Kozhamberdy (yellow card) 23' (goal) 36'; Akhmetov (yellow card) 44'; Gamakov (yellow card) 75'	Stadium: Central Stadium; Attendance: 2,000; Referee: Daniyar Sakhi

27 August 2022 17	Tobol	4–0	Ordabasy	Kostanay
21:00 (UTC+6)	Kairov (yellow card) 4'; Tošić 16'; Vukadinović 33'; Muzhikov 69'; Zhaksylykov 73'; Tomašević (yellow card) 84'	Report	Abdumajidov (yellow card) 13'	Stadium: Central Stadium; Attendance: 2,500; Referee: Timur Kumashev

5 September 2022 18	Kairat	2–3	Tobol	Almaty
19:00 (UTC+6)	Astanov (yellow card) 50'; Shushenachev 53'; Alykulov 90+1' (pen.) (yellow card) 90+1'	Report	Sergeyev 26', 77'; Zhaksylykov 42'; Akmurzin (yellow card) 90+1'	Stadium: Central Stadium; Attendance: 6,200; Referee: Saken Bayimbet

10 September 2022 19	Tobol	0–2	Atyrau	Kostanay
20:00 (UTC+6)	Amanović (yellow card) 38'; Tošić (yellow card) 44'	Report	Imeri 39', 75'; Filipović (yellow card) 54'; Mitrofanov (yellow card) 90+2'	Stadium: Central Stadium; Attendance: Sergey Gorohovodatsky; Referee: 1,400

14 September 2022 20	Astana	1–2	Tobol	Astana
19:00 (UTC+6)	Tomasov (penalty missed) 24'; A.Zarutskiy (yellow card) 29'; Aymbetov 35'; Beysebekov (yellow card) 90+4'	Report	Muzhikov 30' (pen.); Malyi (yellow card) 35' (goal) 71'; Tagybergen (yellow card) 66'; Vasilyev (yellow card) 89'	Stadium: Astana Arena; Attendance: 3,200; Referee: Sariev Bulat
Note: On 13 September, Nur-Sultan was renamed back to Astana.

2 October 2022 21	Tobol	3–1	Shakhter Karagandy	Kostanay
15:00 (UTC+6)	Muzhikov 17'; Zharynbetov (yellow card) 67'; Jovančić 75' (pen.); Amanović (yellow card) 77'; Déblé 82'	Report	Musabekov (yellow card) 16'; Bukorac 39'; Sapanov (yellow card) 47'; Tattybayev (red card) 54'	Stadium: Central Stadium; Attendance: 1,500; Referee: Alexander Zatula

8 October 2022 22	Aksu	3–0	Tobol	Pavlodar
18:00 (UTC+6)	Yesimov 2'; Zhyrgalbek (yellow card) 4'; Silva 7' (yellow card) 22'; Obilor (yellow card) 13'; Zličić 36'	Report		Stadium: Central Stadium; Attendance: 3,270; Referee: Georgy Chekhovsky

15 October 2022 23	Tobol	1–0	Aktobe	Kostanay
15:00 (UTC+6)	Tagybergen (yellow card) 84'; Muzhikov 87' (pen.)	Report	Tanzharikov (yellow card) 8'; Baytana (yellow card) 24'; Žulpa (yellow card) 64'; Orazov (yellow card) 67'; Adukor (yellow card) 82'; Ghinaitis (yellow card) 84'; China (yellow card) 86'; Pokatilov (yellow card) 87'	Stadium: Central Stadium; Attendance: 3,000; Referee: Saken Bayimbet

23 October 2022 24	Maktaaral	2–1	Tobol	Turkistan
16:00 (UTC+6)	Nosko 41'; Djaha (yellow card) 57'; Karimov 45+1' (penalty missed) 69'	Report	Muzhikov (yellow card) 19' (yellow-red card) 88'; Zhumashev (yellow card) 34'; Malyi (yellow card) 54'; Amanović (yellow card) 60'; Vasilyev 73'	Stadium: Turkistan Arena; Attendance: 700; Referee: Artem Kuchin

29 October 2022 25	Taraz	0–2	Tobol	Taraz
17:00 (UTC+6)	Nurdaulet (yellow card) 44'; Junior (yellow card) 65'; Gamakov (yellow card) 77'	Report	Tagybergen 30', 39' (yellow card) 90+4'; Amanović (yellow card) 37'; Kairov (yellow card) 45+1'; Semchenkov (yellow card) 52'	Stadium: Central Stadium; Attendance: 3,500; Referee: Timur Kumashev

6 November 2022 26	Akzhayik	1–3	Tobol	Oral
15:00 (UTC+6)	Kovalenko 78'	Report	Vasilyev (yellow card) 26'; Sergeyev 39'; Déblé 48', 70'	Stadium: Petr Atoyan Stadium; Attendance: 1,500; Referee: Rustam Omarov

==== League table ====
Pos	Team	Pld	W	D	L	GF	GA	GD	Pts	Qualification or relegation
1	Astana (C)	26	16	5	5	65	24	+41	53	Qualification for the Champions League first qualifying round
2	Aktobe	26	16	4	6	43	28	+15	52	Qualification for the Europa Conference League second qualifying round
3	Tobol	26	14	5	7	46	33	+13	47	Qualification for the Europa Conference League first qualifying round
4	Kairat	26	12	6	8	34	36	−2	42	
5	Ordabasy (Note: Qualified as cup winners)	26	11	5	10	36	39	−3	38	Qualification for the Europa Conference League second qualifying round

Source: UEFA, Soccerway
Rules for classification: 1) Points; 2) Goal difference; 3) Matches won; 4) Goals scored; 5) Away goals scored; 6) Head-to-head points; 7) Head-to-head matches won; 8) Head-to-head goal difference; 9) Head-to-head goals scored; 10) Head-to-head away goals scored; 11) Draw.
(C) Champions

=== Kazakhstan Cup ===
==== Group stage ====
Pos	Team	Pld	W	D	L	GF	GA	GD	Pts	Qualification
1	Taraz (A)	6	3	3	0	17	8	+9	12	Advanced to Quarterfinals
2	Maktaaral (A)	6	3	1	2	11	9	+2	10	Advanced to Quarterfinals
3	Aktobe	6	2	2	2	6	6	0	8	
4	Tobol	6	1	0	5	7	18	−11	3	

Updated to match(es) played on 14 August 2022. Source: PFLK
(A) Advance to a further round

9 July 202 1	Taraz	6–1	Tobol	Taraz
21:00 (UTC+6)	Karaman 14'; Kuantayev 17'; Kaldybekov (yellow card) 27'; Junior 57'; Gadrani 77'; Shakhmetov 82'; Baytana 87'	Report	Alpispaev (yellow card) 51'; A.Zhaksylykov 60'; Zhaparov (yellow card) 63'	Stadium: Central Stadium; Attendance: 5,500; Referee: Aydyn Tasybaev

16 July 2022 2	Tobol	2–1	Aktobe	Kostanay
19:00 (UTC+6)	Marochkin 24'; A.Zhaksylykov 41'; Muzhikov (yellow card) 43'; Semchenkov (yellow card) 87'	Report	Balashov 33'; Orazov (yellow card) 39'; Žulpa (yellow card) 58'; Samorodov (yellow card) 78'; Kenesov (yellow card) 88'	Stadium: Central Stadium; Attendance: 2,000; Referee: Denis Tevyashov

24 July 2022 3	Tobol	1–4	Maktaaral	Kostanay
19:00 (UTC+6)	Yermekbaev 36'	Report	Yudenkov 15'; Abdurakhmanov (yellow card) 18'; Ryskul 35'; Karimov 49'; Kenzhebek 88'	Stadium: Central Stadium; Attendance: 2,500; Referee: Bagdat Abdullaev

31 July 2022 4	Maktaaral	1–0	Tobol	Turkistan
21:00 (UTC+6)	Sebaihi (yellow card) 40'; Karimov 53'; Ryskul (yellow card) 66'; Zhaparov (yellow card) 72'; Payruz (yellow card) 90+1'	Report	Panov (yellow card) 21'	Stadium: Turkistan Arena; Attendance: 1,200; Referee: Sergey Gorokhovodatskiy

7 August 2022 5	Tobol	3–5	Taraz	Kostanay
21:00 (UTC+6)	Sergeyev 9', 18'; A.Zhaksylykov 53'; Dubrovin (yellow card) 80'	Report	Zhumabek 23', 61', 82', 88'; Kalmuratov (yellow card) 43'; Shakhmetov 34'; Dairov (yellow card) 64'	Stadium: Central Stadium; Attendance: 1,200; Referee: Aleksandr Zatula

14 August 2022 6	Aktobe	1–0	Tobol	Aktobe
21:00 (UTC+6)	Kulpeisov 27' (o.g.); Orazov (yellow card) 76'	Report	N.Zhaksylykov (yellow card) 36'	Stadium: Koblandy Batyr Stadium; Attendance: 11,000; Referee: Aydyn Tasybaev

=== UEFA Champions League ===
==== Qualifying rounds ====
6 July 2022 First Qualifying Round 1st leg	Tobol (Kazakhstan)	0–0	(Hungary) Ferencváros	Kostanay, Kazakhstan
20:00 (UTC+6)	Jovančić (yellow card) 32'; Kairov (yellow card) 38'	Report	Vécsei (yellow card) 33'; Boli (yellow card) 38'; Laïdouni (yellow card) 71'	Stadium: Central Stadium; Attendance: 8,420; Referee: Dario Bel (Croatia)

14 July 2022 First Qualifying Round 2nd leg	Ferencváros (Hungary)	5–1 (5–1 agg.)	(Kazakhstan) Tobol	Budapest, Hungary
00:00 (UTC+6)	Traoré 4', 17'; Laïdouni 21'; Kovačević (yellow card) 56'; Bassey 74', 90+1'	Report	Sergeyev 23'; Muzhikov (yellow card) 78' (yellow-red card) 81'	Stadium: Ferencváros Stadion; Attendance: 17,347; Referee: Krzysztof Jakubik (Poland)

=== UEFA Europa Conference League ===
==== Qualifying rounds ====
21 July 2022 Second Qualifying Round 1st leg	Tobol (Kazakhstan)	2–0	(Gibraltar) Lincoln Red Imps	Kostanay, Kazakhstan
20:00 (UTC+6)	Zharynbetov (yellow card) 35'; Kairov (yellow card) 43'; Zhaksylykov 65'; Tomašević (yellow card) 79' (goal) 90+1'	Report	Toscano (yellow card) 54'; Ronan (yellow card) 62'	Stadium: Central Stadium; Attendance: 6,000; Referee: Matthew De Gabriele (Malta)

26 July 2022 Second Qualifying Round 2nd leg	Lincoln Red Imps (Gibraltar)	0–1 (0–3 agg.)	(Kazakhstan) Tobol	Gibraltar
22:00 (UTC+6)	Nano (yellow card) 13'; Yahaya (yellow card) 14'	Report	Kairov (yellow card) 27'; Tošić 31'; Déblé (yellow card) 80'; Zharynbetov (yellow card) 82'	Stadium: Victoria Stadium; Attendance: 742; Referee: Gal Leibovitz (Israel)

5 August 2022 Third Qualifying Round 1st leg	Zrinjski Mostar (Bosnia and Herzegovina)	1–0	(Kazakhstan) Tobol	Mostar, Bosnia and Herzegovina
01:00 (UTC+6)	Bilbija (yellow card) 31'; Ćorluka (yellow card) 42' (yellow-red card) 55'; Janković 76'; Mandić (yellow card) 90+1'	Report	Tagybergen (yellow card) 28'; Malyi (yellow card) 48'; Tomašević (yellow card) 84' (red card) 85'; Zharynbetov (yellow card) 90+3'	Stadium: Stadion pod Bijelim Brijegom; Attendance: 4,754; Referee: António Nobre (Portugal)

11 August 2022 Third Qualifying Round 2nd leg	Tobol (Kazakhstan)	1–1 (1–2 agg.)	(Bosnia and Herzegovina) Zrinjski Mostar	Kostanay, Kazakhstan
20:00 (UTC+6)	Tošić (yellow card) 6'; Marochkin (yellow card) 37'; Déblé (yellow card) 49' (goal) 53'; Malyi (yellow card) 58'; Mokin (red card) 80'; Amanović (yellow card) 90'; Jovančić (yellow card) 90'; Kairov (yellow card) 90+7'	Report	Ćuže 34' (yellow card) 57'; Savić (yellow card) 36'; Jukić (yellow card) 50'; Malekinušić (yellow card) 65'; Janković (yellow card) 90+2'; Čondrić (yellow card) 90+6'	Stadium: Central Stadium; Attendance: 6,000; Referee: Nathan Verboomen (Belgium)

== Squad statistics ==
As of match played 6 November 2022

=== Appearances and goals ===
No.	Pos	Nat	Player	Total		Premier League		Kazakhstan Cup		Super Cup		UEFA Champions League		UEFA Europa Conference League	
No.	Pos	Nat	Player	Apps	Goals	Apps	Goals	Apps	Goals	Apps	Goals	Apps	Goals	Apps	Goals
3	DF	(Kazakhstan) KAZ	Roman Asrankulov	14	0	0+10	0	4	0	0	0	0	0	0	0
5	DF	(Kazakhstan) KAZ	Daniyar Semchenkov	4	0	0+1	0	3	0	0	0	0	0	0	0
8	MF	(Kazakhstan) KAZ	Askhat Tagybergen	32	8	23+1	8	0+1	0	0+1	0	2	0	4	0
10	MF	(Kazakhstan) KAZ	Serikzhan Muzhikov	22	5	11+3	4	1+1	0	1	1	0+2	0	1+2	0
11	MF	(Serbia) SRB	Zoran Tošić	31	6	21+2	5	0+1	0	1	0	2	0	4	1
14	MF	(Kazakhstan) KAZ	Samat Zharynbetov	31	0	11+12	0	0+1	0	0+1	0	2	0	4	0
17	MF	(Kazakhstan) KAZ	Vladislav Vasilyev	27	1	13+9	1	2	0	1	0	0	0	0+2	0
20	MF	(Kazakhstan) KAZ	Zhaslan Zhumashev	16	0	1+10	0	3	0	0	0	0	0	0+2	0
21	MF	(Serbia) SRB	Miljan Vukadinović	14	1	5+1	1	2	0	0	0	0+2	0	2+2	0
22	DF	(Kazakhstan) KAZ	Aleksandr Marochkin	24	0	13+5	0	1	0	1	0	0	0	4	0
24	DF	(Kazakhstan) KAZ	Bagdat Kairov	28	0	19+1	0	1+1	0	1	0	2	0	3	0
25	DF	(Kazakhstan) KAZ	Serhiy Malyi	30	4	22+1	4	0	0	1	0	2	0	3+1	0
27	GK	(Kazakhstan) KAZ	Vladimir Shpakovskiy	3	0	0	0	3	0	0	0	0	0	0	0
29	MF	(Serbia) SRB	Dušan Jovančić	32	3	24	3	1	0	1	0	2	0	4	0
31	MF	(Kazakhstan) KAZ	Toktar Baydavletov	4	0	0	0	1+3	0	0	0	0	0	0	0
32	DF	(Kazakhstan) KAZ	Dmitry Panov	5	0	0	0	4+1	0	0	0	0	0	0	0
33	DF	(Montenegro) MNE	Žarko Tomašević	28	2	22	1	0	0	1	0	2	0	3	1
34	DF	(Kazakhstan) KAZ	Asan Bitekenov	1	0	0	0	0+1	0	0	0	0	0	0	0
35	GK	(Kazakhstan) KAZ	Aleksandr Mokin	22	0	15	0	0	0	1	0	2	0	4	0
36	DF	(Kazakhstan) KAZ	Aleksandr Krytsa	3	0	0	0	3	0	0	0	0	0	0	0
37	DF	(Kazakhstan) KAZ	Arman Tungushbaev	4	0	0	0	2+2	0	0	0	0	0	0	0
39	FW	(Kazakhstan) KAZ	Bekzat Yermekbaev	5	1	0	0	4+1	1	0	0	0	0	0	0
40	MF	(Kazakhstan) KAZ	Timur Igubaev	1	0	0	0	0+1	0	0	0	0	0	0	0
41	MF	(Kazakhstan) KAZ	Daniil Dubrovin	3	0	0	0	0+3	0	0	0	0	0	0	0
42	DF	(Kazakhstan) KAZ	Evgeniy Kochetkov	1	0	0	0	1	0	0	0	0	0	0	0
43	FW	(Kazakhstan) KAZ	Dias Nurkanov	4	0	0	0	2+2	0	0	0	0	0	0	0
44	FW	(Kazakhstan) KAZ	Aybar Zhaksylykov	32	7	7+16	3	2	2	0+1	1	1+1	0	1+3	1
45	DF	(North Macedonia) MKD	Aleksa Amanović	27	1	20+1	1	0	0	0	0	2	0	4	0
46	MF	(Kazakhstan) KAZ	Ali Abdibek	1	0	0	0	0+1	0	0	0	0	0	0	0
47	MF	(Kazakhstan) KAZ	Vyacheslav Kulpeisov	3	0	0	0	3	0	0	0	0	0	0	0
48	DF	(Kazakhstan) KAZ	Marat Alpisbaev	5	0	0	0	4+1	0	0	0	0	0	0	0
50	MF	(Kazakhstan) KAZ	Bekzat Zhaparov	4	0	0	0	4	0	0	0	0	0	0	0
51	MF	(Kazakhstan) KAZ	Beybit Galym	2	0	0	0	0+2	0	0	0	0	0	0	0
52	MF	(Kazakhstan) KAZ	Nurbek Bayzhanov	5	0	0	0	4+1	0	0	0	0	0	0	0
53	DF	(Kazakhstan) KAZ	Bekzat Minaydarov	2	0	0	0	0+2	0	0	0	0	0	0	0
54	MF	(Kazakhstan) KAZ	Matvey Tsoy	1	0	0	0	0+1	0	0	0	0	0	0	0
55	FW	(Kazakhstan) KAZ	Ali Akhmet	4	0	0	0	2+2	0	0	0	0	0	0	0
57	MF	(Kazakhstan) KAZ	Nurali Zhaksylykov	2	1	0	0	2	1	0	0	0	0	0	0
77	FW	(Uzbekistan) UZB	Igor Sergeyev	33	12	20+6	9	1+1	2	1	0	1+1	1	1+1	0
88	GK	(Russia) RUS	Timur Akmurzin	14	0	9+1	0	3	0	0	0	0	0	0+1	0
89	FW	(Ivory Coast) CIV	Serges Déblé	16	4	9+1	3	1	0	0	0	0+1	0	2+2	1
93	MF	(Nigeria) NGR	Chidi Osuchukwu	10	1	2+5	1	2	0	0	0	0	0	0+1	0
Players away from Tobol on loan:
Players who left Tobol during the season:
7	DF	(Kazakhstan) KAZ	Dmitry Miroshnichenko	6	0	3+3	0	0	0	0	0	0	0	0	0
18	MF	(Portugal) POR	Rúben Brígido	17	1	13+1	1	0	0	1	0	2	0	0	0
23	GK	(Kazakhstan) KAZ	Dmytro Nepohodov	2	0	2	0	0	0	0	0	0	0	0	0
94	MF	(Slovenia) SLO	Rudi Požeg Vancaš	6	1	1+5	1	0	0	0	0	0	0	0	0

=== Goal scorers ===
Place	Position	Nation	Number	Name	Premier League	Kazakhstan Cup	Super Cup	UEFA Champions League	UEFA Europa Conference League	Total
1	FW	(Uzbekistan)	77	Igor Sergeyev	9	2	0	1	0	12
2	MF	(Kazakhstan)	8	Askhat Tagybergen	8	0	0	0	0	8
2	FW	(Kazakhstan)	44	Aybar Zhaksylykov	3	3	1	0	1	8
4	MF	(Serbia)	11	Zoran Tošić	5	0	0	0	1	6
5	MF	(Kazakhstan)	10	Serikzhan Muzhikov	4	0	1	0	0	5
6	DF	(Kazakhstan)	25	Serhiy Malyi	4	0	0	0	0	4
6	FW	(Ivory Coast)	89	Serges Déblé	3	0	0	0	1	4
8	MF	(Serbia)	29	Dušan Jovančić	3	0	0	0	0	3
9	DF	(Montenegro)	33	Žarko Tomašević	1	0	0	0	1	2
10	DF	(North Macedonia)	45	Aleksa Amanović	1	0	0	0	0	1
10	MF	(Portugal)	18	Rúben Brígido	1	0	0	0	0	1
10	MF	(Slovenia)	94	Rudi Požeg Vancaš	1	0	0	0	0	1
10	MF	(Serbia)	21	Miljan Vukadinović	1	0	0	0	0	1
10	MF	(Nigeria)	93	Chidi Osuchukwu	1	0	0	0	0	1
10	MF	(Kazakhstan)	17	Vladislav Vasilyev	1	0	0	0	0	1
10	DF	(Kazakhstan)	22	Aleksandr Marochkin	0	1	0	0	0	1
10	FW	(Kazakhstan)	39	Bekzat Yermekbaev	0	1	0	0	0	1
				TOTALS	46	7	2	1	4	60

=== Clean sheets ===
Place	Position	Nation	Number	Name	Premier League	Kazakhstan Cup	Super Cup	UEFA Champions League	UEFA Europa Conference League	Total
1	GK	(Kazakhstan)	35	Aleksandr Mokin	6	0	0	1	2	9
2	GK	(Russia)	88	Timur Akmurzin	3	0	0	0	0	3
3	GK	(Kazakhstan)	23	Dmytro Nepohodov	1	0	0	0	0	1
				TOTALS	10	0	0	1	2	13

=== Disciplinary record ===
Number	Nation	Position	Name	Premier League		Kazakhstan Cup		Super Cup		UEFA Champions League		UEFA Europa Conference League		Total	
Number	Nation	Position	Name	Booked	Sent off (straight red)	Booked	Sent off (straight red)	Booked	Sent off (straight red)	Booked	Sent off (straight red)	Booked	Sent off (straight red)	Booked	Sent off (straight red)
5	(Kazakhstan)	DF	Daniyar Semchenkov	1	0	1	0	0	0	0	0	0	0	2	0
8	(Kazakhstan)	MF	Askhat Tagybergen	8	0	0	0	0	0	0	0	1	0	9	0
10	(Kazakhstan)	MF	Serikzhan Muzhikov	2	1	1	0	1	0	2	1	0	0	5	2
11	(Serbia)	MF	Zoran Tošić	6	0	0	0	0	0	0	0	1	0	7	0
14	(Kazakhstan)	MF	Samat Zharynbetov	3	0	0	0	0	0	0	0	3	0	6	0
17	(Kazakhstan)	MF	Vladislav Vasilyev	3	0	0	0	0	0	0	0	0	0	3	0
20	(Kazakhstan)	MF	Zhaslan Zhumashev	1	0	0	0	0	0	0	0	0	0	1	0
22	(Kazakhstan)	DF	Aleksandr Marochkin	0	0	0	0	0	0	0	0	1	0	1	0
24	(Kazakhstan)	DF	Bagdat Kairov	6	0	0	0	0	0	1	0	3	0	9	0
25	(Kazakhstan)	DF	Serhiy Malyi	4	0	0	0	0	0	0	0	2	0	6	0
29	(Serbia)	MF	Dušan Jovančić	7	0	0	0	1	0	0	0	1	0	9	0
32	(Kazakhstan)	MF	Dmitry Panov	0	0	1	0	0	0	0	0	0	0	1	0
33	(Montenegro)	DF	Žarko Tomašević	5	0	0	0	0	0	0	0	2	1	7	1
35	(Kazakhstan)	GK	Aleksandr Mokin	0	0	0	0	0	0	0	0	0	1	0	1
41	(Kazakhstan)	MF	Daniil Dubrovin	0	0	1	0	0	0	0	0	0	0	1	0
44	(Kazakhstan)	FW	Aybar Zhaksylykov	2	0	0	0	0	0	0	0	0	0	2	0
45	(North Macedonia)	DF	Aleksa Amanović	10	1	0	0	0	0	0	0	1	0	11	1
48	(Kazakhstan)	DF	Marat Alpispaev	0	0	1	0	0	0	0	0	0	0	1	0
50	(Kazakhstan)	MF	Bekzat Zhaparov	0	0	1	0	0	0	0	0	0	0	1	0
57	(Kazakhstan)	MF	Nurali Zhaksylykov	0	0	1	0	0	0	0	0	0	0	1	0
88	(Russia)	GK	Timur Akmurzin	1	0	0	0	0	0	0	0	0	0	1	0
89	(Ivory Coast)	FW	Serges Déblé	0	0	0	0	0	0	0	0	2	0	2	0
Players who left Tobol during the season:
18	(Portugal)	MF	Rúben Brígido	2	0	0	0	0	0	0	0	0	0	2	0
			TOTALS	61	2	7	0	2	0	3	1	17	2	90	5
