= Zoran Tošić =

Serbian footballer (born 1987)

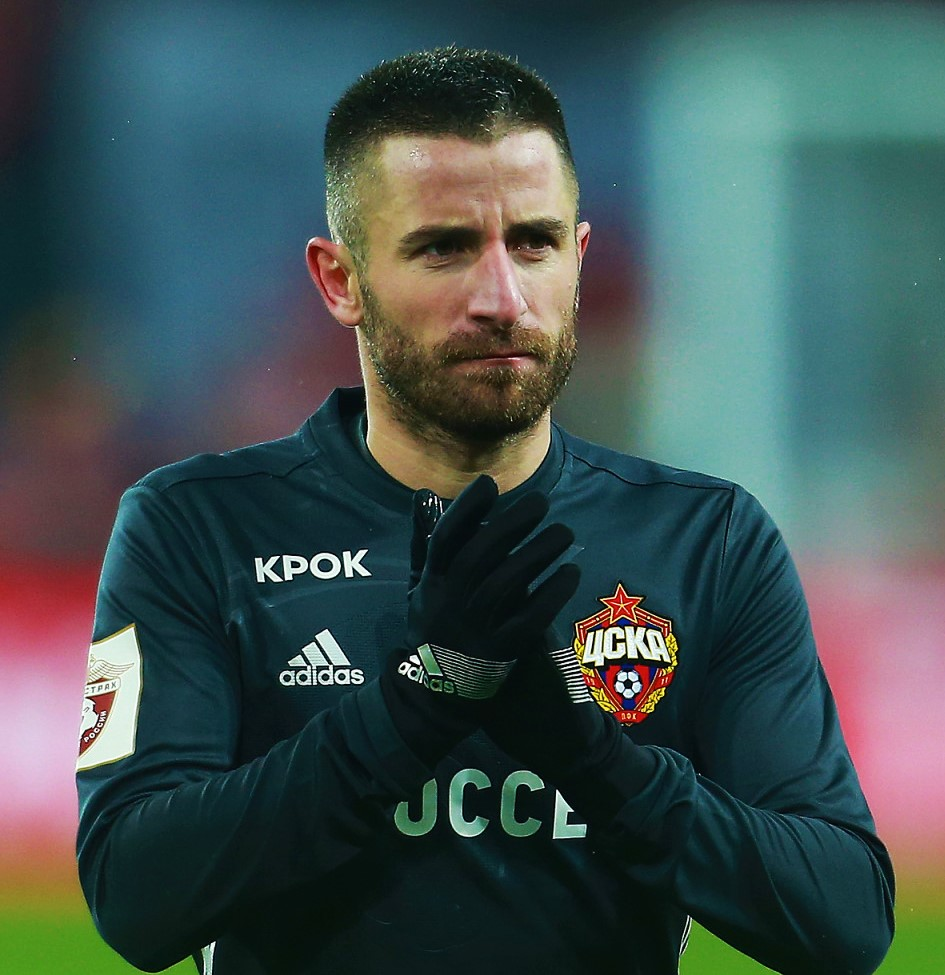
- Tošić with CSKA Moscow in 2016

Personal information
- Date of birth: 28 April 1987 (age 39)
- Place of birth: Zrenjanin, SR Serbia, SFR Yugoslavia
- Height: 1.71 m (5 ft 7 in)
- Position: Winger

Youth career
- Radnički Zrenjanin
- Proleter Zrenjanin

Senior career*
Years	Team	Apps	(Gls)
2004–2005	Mladost Lukićevo	12	(0)
2005–2006	Budućnost Banatski Dvor	7	(0)
2006–2007	Banat Zrenjanin	25	(2)
2007–2009	Partizan	49	(14)
2009–2010	Manchester United	2	(0)
2010	→ 1. FC Köln (loan)	13	(5)
2010–2017	CSKA Moscow	182	(37)
2017–2020	Partizan	55	(20)
2020	Taizhou Yuanda	9	(3)
2021–2022	Tobol	31	(6)
2023–2024	Lamia	35	(3)
Total		420	(90)

International career
2007–2009	Serbia U21	17	(2)
2007–2016	Serbia	76	(11)
Medal record
Silver medal – second place	UEFA Under-21 Championship	2007
- * Club domestic league appearances and goals

Zoran Tošić (Serbian Cyrillic: Зоран Тошић, pronounced [zǒran tǒʃitɕ, - tôː-]; born 28 April 1987) is a Serbian former footballer who played as a winger. He built a reputation as a free-kick specialist and a tricky dribbler.

Tošić began his career with two local clubs, Radnički Zrenjanin and Proleter Zrenjanin, before making his senior debut with Mladost Lukićevo. He joined Budućnost Banatski Dvor, which later merged with Proleter to form Banat Zrenjanin. One year later, Tošić signed for Serbian giants Partizan, for whom he played for two years before a high-profile move to Manchester United of England. Struggling to break into the Red Devils first team, he was sent on a six-month loan to German club 1. FC Köln in January 2010 before transferring to Russian club CSKA Moscow the same year in summer.

A full international footballer between 2007 and 2016, Tošić has earned 76 appearances for Serbia. He was part of their teams at the 2008 Summer Olympics and 2010 World Cup.

== Club career ==
=== Early career ===
Born in Zrenjanin, SR Serbia, SFR Yugoslavia, Tošić begin his career in Radnički and Proleter Zrenjanin, but left the latter because he was thought to be "physically weak". He began his senior career with Mladost Lukićevo in early 2004. After he terminated a contract with the club, he stayed without a club to play for a six-month period. He also played futsal with KMF SAS in the meantime. He later moved to Budućnost Banatski Dvor before the club merged with Proleter Zrenjanin to form Banat Zrenjanin. With 25 appearances for Banat in the 2006–07 Serbian SuperLiga, Tošić scored two goals and helped his team avoid relegation.

Tošić's performances on both the domestic appearance with Banat and international appearance with Serbia earned him interests from many clubs across Europe. On 6 August 2007, Tošić signed a four-year professional contract with Partizan. He made his Partizan debut in a 1–0 league victory against Vojvodina at Stadion Karađorđe on 11 August, coming on as a substitute for the injured Almami Moreira in the 15th minute.

=== Manchester United ===
Tošić was subject to a successful work permit application as the player had not played the required 75% of his team's matches in the previous year. On 28 November, there were reports that Tošić had been granted a work permit, with the transfer expected to go through at the start of the transfer window. Despite claims that negotiations had stalled over Tošić's personal terms, the transfer was finalised on 2 January 2009, with both Tošić and his Partizan teammate Adem Ljajić joining United. Tošić was given the number 14 shirt.

Tošić received his first team football debut on 20 January 2009, when he was named on the bench for United's League Cup semi-final second leg at home to Derby County. He made his debut in an FA Cup Fourth round match against Tottenham Hotspur on 24 January 2009, when he came on as a 72nd-minute substitute for Cristiano Ronaldo. Tošić made his league debut on 27 January 2009, coming on as a substitute at the 77th minute for Dimitar Berbatov in Manchester United's 5–0 victory against West Bromwich Albion. Although he did not make many first team appearances in his first season at Manchester United, Tošić became a regular footballer in the club's reserve team, helping the team to reach second place in the Premier Reserve League before scoring the winning goal in the final of the 2009 Manchester Senior Cup against Bolton Wanderers at the Reebok Stadium.

Tošić scored his first senior goal for the club on 26 July 2009 in an 8–2 victory against Hangzhou Greentown during United's pre-season campaign in Asia.

In a Scottish newspaper interview in September 2012, Tošić stated that he regretted walking out on Manchester United.

=== Loan to 1. FC Köln ===
On 27 January 2010, Tošić joined 1. FC Köln on loan until the end of the 2009–10 season. He made his debut three days later, coming on as a substitute for Taner Yalçın in the 54th minute of Köln's 2–1 away victory against Eintracht Frankfurt on 30 January. On 27 March 2010, Tošić scored his first two goals for Köln in his eighth appearance for them, in a 4–1 away victory against Hannover 96. However, in his next league match one week later, he was sent off after two offences at 45 seconds, coming in a 3–0 home defeat against Hertha BSC. On 17 April 2010, after his one-match ban was over, Tošić returned to the squad and scored two goals in a 2–0 victory against VfL Bochum. After five months with Köln, he returned to Manchester United in June 2010.

=== CSKA Moscow ===
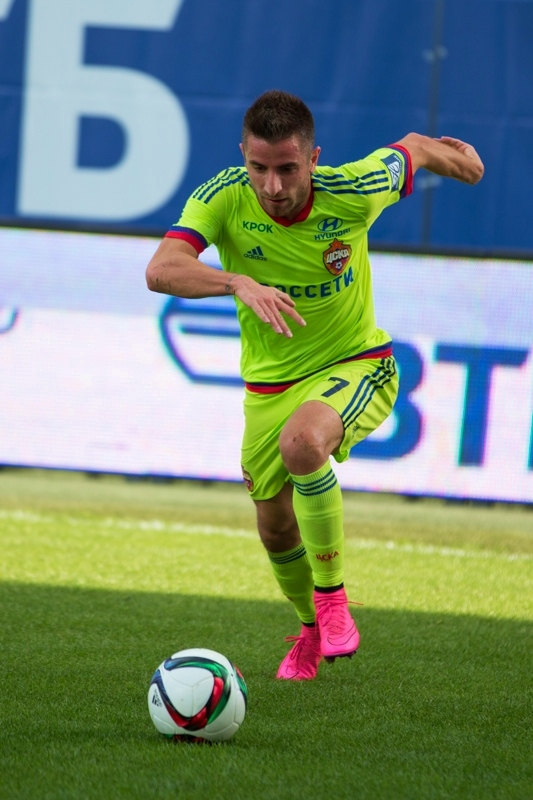
Tošić with CSKA Moscow in 2015

On 15 June 2010, Tošić was signed on a five-year contract by CSKA Moscow for an undisclosed fee, believed to be in the region of £8 million.

On 15 August 2010, Tošić scored his first goal for CSKA in a home match against Anzhi Makhachkala in the Russian Premier League. Four days later, in his European debut for the Russian side, he scored two goals in a UEFA Europa League 4–0 home victory against Cypriot club Anorthosis Famagusta. On 12 December 2010, Tošić scored his first goal in a UEFA Europa League group stage match in a 5–1 victory against Lausanne. On 17 March 2011, Tošić scored one more goal in Europa League in return leg of Round of 16 against Porto at Estádio do Dragão.

On 22 May 2011, Tošić played as a starter for CSKA Moscow in a 2–1 victory against Alania Vladikavkaz in the 2011 Russian Cup final, only to be replaced by Lithuanian defender Deividas Šemberas in the 83rd minute. Three days later, he netted the final goal of a 3–0 victory against Krylia Sovetov Samara after Keisuke Honda had given the visitors a 2–0 lead.

On 14 March 2012, Tošić scored a spectacular goal against Real Madrid at Santiago Bernabéu in second leg of Round of 16 of UEFA Champions League.

Tošić opened the scoring against Spartak on 19 March 2012 as his side claimed a 2–1 victory thanks to a late Seydou Doumbia goal. He scored both goals on 28 April against city rivals Spartak Moscow, as CSKA again won 2–1 in front of 50,000 fans at the Luzhniki Stadium. He then scored two late goals against their other local rivals Lokomotiv Moscow on 2 May, propelling CSKA to a 3–1 victory on the penultimate matchday of the Championship Group of the Premier League season.

On 2 October 2013, Tošić scored a goal and made an assist in a 3–2 home victory against Viktoria Plzeň in UEFA Champions League. On 23 October 2013, in next round of UCL, Tošić scored a goal against Manchester City. Four days later, Tošić scored a hat-trick in a 5–1 league victory against Krasnodar. Tošić scored the game's only goal as CSKA defeated rivals Lokomotiv on 15 May 2014 to secure a second successive Russian Premier League title.

On 23 July 2014, Tošić signed a new contract with CSKA until the end of the 2016–17 season, with Tošić leaving CSKA at the end of this contract on 5 July 2017.

=== Return to Partizan ===
On 28 August 2017, Tošić returned to Partizan on a three-year contract. On 9 September 2017, he re-debutted for the club against Mladost Lučani. Eight days later, Tošić scored the opening goal in a 3–1 victory against Radnički Niš. On 20 October, he successfully converted the first penalty in his career, in 2–0 away victory against Radnik Surdulica. Nine days later, he missed the penalty in the 88th minute, but scored in the injury time from a free-kick end the match with Partizan's 2–1 away victory against Borac Čačak. On 2 November, Tošić scored the opener from a free kick in a 2–0 home victory against Skënderbeu Korçë in the fourth match of the 2017–18 UEFA Europa League group stage.

On 1 August 2019, Tošić scored the opening goal in a 3–0 home victory against Connah's Quay Nomads in the UEFA Europa League qualifications. This was Partizan's 350th goal in Europe since the inaugural European Cup game in 1955. Tošić scored his first Eternal derby goal on 22 September 2019 in a 2–0 home victory against rivals Red Star Belgrade.

=== Later career ===
On 27 February 2020, Tošić signed for Chinese football club Taizhou Yuanda.

On 16 April 2021, Tošić signed for Kazakh cub FC Tobol on a contract until the end of the year. He made his debut two weeks later, coming on in the 81st minute as a substitute for Azat Nurgaliyev in a 2–1 away loss against Caspiy. Tošić's first goals came on 10 July in the first round of Group B of the 2021 Kazakhstan Cup in a 3–1 win over FC Taraz. On 17 January 2023, Tobol announced that Tošić had left the club after his contract had expired.

On 26 January 2023, Tošić signed for Super League Greece club Lamia. He retired from football in September 2024.

== International career ==
=== Early career ===
Tošić made his debut for the Serbia under-21 team on 23 March 2007, against Belgium. Four days later, against Portugal, he scored his first international goal. He also took part in Serbia's 2007 UEFA European Under-21 Championship campaign, in which they reached the final before losing against the Netherlands.

=== Senior ===
On 31 August 2007, Tošić received his first call-up to the senior Serbian senior team for the Euro 2008 qualifier against Finland and Portugal by national team manager Javier Clemente. He made his international debut in a match against the former opponent. Tošić scored his first international goal on 12 August 2009 against South Africa in a friendly match; he scored twice in a 3–1 victory.

In June 2010, Tošić was selected in Serbia's squad for the 2010 FIFA World Cup, where he appeared in group stage match against Australia.

On 11 October 2014, Tošić scored an extra-time equaliser for a 1–1 draw away against Armenia in a UEFA Euro 2016 qualifying. In November 2016, he played his final international match during an away friendly one against Ukraine.

== Career statistics ==
=== Club ===
As of match played 15 May 2024

Appearances and goals by club, season and competition
Club	Season	League			National cup		League cup		Continental		Other (Note: Appearances in FA Community Shield, UEFA Super Cup, Intercontinental Cup, FIFA Club World Cup)		Total	
Club	Season	Division	Apps	Goals	Apps	Goals	Apps	Goals	Apps	Goals	Apps	Goals	Apps	Goals
Mladost Lukićevo	2003–04	Second League of Serbia and Montenegro	3	0	—		—		—				3	0
Mladost Lukićevo	2004–05	Serbian League Vojvodina	9	0	—		—		—				9	0
Mladost Lukićevo	Total		12	0	—		—		—				12	0
Budućnost Banatski Dvor	2005–06	First League of Serbia and Montenegro	7	0	0	0	—		—		—		7	0
Banat Zrenjanin	2006–07	Serbian SuperLiga	25	2	3	0	—		—		—		28	2
Partizan	2007–08	Serbian SuperLiga	32	8	4	1	—		0	0	—		36	9
Partizan	2008–09	Serbian SuperLiga	17	6	1	1	—		7	2	—		25	9
Partizan	Total		49	14	5	2	—		7	2	—		61	18
Manchester United	2008–09	Premier League	2	0	1	0	0	0	0	0	0	0	3	0
Manchester United	2009–10	Premier League	0	0	0	0	2	0	0	0	0	0	2	0
Manchester United	Total		2	0	1	0	2	0	0	0	0	0	5	0
1. FC Köln (loan)	2009–10	Bundesliga	13	5	1	0	—		—		—		14	5
CSKA Moscow	2010	Russian Premier League	15	3	3	0	—		12	4	0	0	30	7
CSKA Moscow	2011–12	Russian Premier League	36	8	1	0	—		6	1	0	0	43	9
CSKA Moscow	2012–13	Russian Premier League	25	3	1	0	—		2	0	0	0	28	3
CSKA Moscow	2013–14	Russian Premier League	27	11	3	0	—		6	2	0	0	36	13
CSKA Moscow	2014–15	Russian Premier League	27	7	1	0	—		5	0	1	1	34	8
CSKA Moscow	2015–16	Russian Premier League	28	4	3	1	—		10	1	0	0	41	6
CSKA Moscow	2016–17	Russian Premier League	24	1	0	0	—		4	0	1	0	29	1
CSKA Moscow	Total		182	37	12	1	—		45	8	2	1	241	47
Partizan	2017–18	Serbian SuperLiga	22	11	4	2	—		5	1	—		31	14
Partizan	2018–19	Serbian SuperLiga	16	4	4	1	—		1	0	—		21	5
Partizan	2019–20	Serbian SuperLiga	17	5	0	0	—		12	2	—		29	7
Partizan	Total		55	20	8	3	—		18	3	—		81	26
Taizhou Yuanda	2020	China League One	9	3	1	0	—		—		—		10	3
Tobol	2021	Kazakhstan Premier League	8	1	5	4	—		4	0	—		17	5
Tobol	2022	Kazakhstan Premier League	23	5	1	0	—		6	1	1	0	31	6
Tobol	Total		31	6	6	4	—		10	1	1	0	48	11
Lamia	2022–23	Super League Greece	4	2	0	0	—		—		—		4	2
Lamia	2023–24	Super League Greece	31	1	0	0	—		—		—		31	1
Lamia	Total		35	3	0	0	—		—		—		35	3
Career total			420	90	37	10	2	0	80	14	3	1	542	115

=== International ===
Appearances and goals by national team and year
National team	Year	Apps	Goals
Serbia	2007	4	0
Serbia	2008	7	0
Serbia	2009	6	3
Serbia	2010	10	1
Serbia	2011	10	3
Serbia	2012	9	1
Serbia	2013	7	0
Serbia	2014	9	2
Serbia	2015	8	1
Serbia	2016	6	0
Total		76	11

Scores and results list Serbia's goal tally first, score column indicates score after each Tošić goal.

List of international goals scored by Zoran Tošić
No.	Date	Venue	Opponent	Score	Result	Competition
1	12 August 2009	Lucas Masterpieces Moripe Stadium, Pretoria, South Africa	South Africa	1–0	3–1	Friendly
2	12 August 2009	Lucas Masterpieces Moripe Stadium, Pretoria, South Africa	South Africa	3–0	3–1	Friendly
3	14 October 2009	Sūduva Stadium, Marijampolė, Lithuania	Lithuania	1–1	1–2	2010 FIFA World Cup qualification
4	3 March 2010	Stade du 5 Juillet 1962, Algiers, Algeria	Algeria	3–0	3–0	Friendly
5	9 February 2011	Bloomfield Stadium, Tel Aviv, Israel	Israel	1–0	2–0	Friendly
6	25 March 2011	Stadion Rajko Mitić, Belgrade, Serbia	Northern Ireland	2–1	2–1	UEFA Euro 2012 qualification
7	6 September 2011	Partizan Stadium, Belgrade, Serbia	Faroe Islands	2–0	3–0	UEFA Euro 2012 qualification
8	11 September 2012	Karađorđe Stadium, Novi Sad, Serbia	Wales	2–0	6–1	2014 FIFA World Cup qualification
9	11 October 2014	Vazgen Sargsyan Republican Stadium, Yerevan, Armenia	Armenia	1–1	1–1	UEFA Euro 2016 qualification
10	14 November 2014	Partizan Stadium, Belgrade, Serbia	Denmark	1–0	1–3	UEFA Euro 2016 qualification
11	11 October 2015	Partizan Stadium, Belgrade, Serbia	Portugal	1–1	1–2	UEFA Euro 2016 qualification

== Honours ==
Partizan

- Serbian SuperLiga: 2007–08, 2008–09
- Serbian Cup: 2007–08, 2017–18, 2018–19

CSKA Moscow

- Russian Premier League: 2012–13, 2013–14, 2015–16
- Russian Cup: 2010–11, 2012–13
- Russian Super Cup: 2014

Tobol

- Kazakhstan Premier League: 2021
- Kazakhstan Super Cup: 2022

Individual

- List of 33 top players of the Russian league: 2012–13, 2013–14, 2014–15
