= 2004–05 Second League of Serbia and Montenegro =

Second League of Serbia and Montenegro
- Season: 2004–05
- Champions: Budućnost Banatski Dvor (Serbia); Jedinstvo Bijelo Polje (Montenegro)

2004–05 Second League of Serbia and Montenegro (Serbian: Druga liga Srbije i Crne Gore 2004/05) consisted of two groups, Serbia with 20 teams and Montenegro with 10 teams.

== League table ==
=== Serbia ===
Pos	Team	Pld	W	D	L	GF	GA	GD	Pts	Promotion or relegation
1	Budućnost Banatski Dvor (C, P)	38	22	10	6	69	34	+35	76	Promotion to Serbia and Montenegro SuperLiga
2	Javor Ivanjica (P)	38	22	8	8	44	30	+14	74	Promotion to Serbia and Montenegro SuperLiga
3	Rad (P)	38	21	8	9	64	30	+34	71	Promotion to Serbia and Montenegro SuperLiga
4	Mladost Apatin	38	17	12	9	50	31	+19	63	
5	Bežanija	38	17	7	14	59	53	+6	58	
6	Napredak Kruševac	38	14	13	11	46	37	+9	55	
7	Jedinstvo Ub	38	13	14	11	44	35	+9	53	
8	Spartak Subotica	38	13	13	12	53	44	+9	52	
9	Srem	38	15	7	16	50	48	+2	52	
10	Novi Pazar	38	14	10	14	37	39	−2	52	
11	Mačva Šabac	38	14	10	14	44	51	−7	52	
12	Voždovac (P)	38	12	15	11	46	37	+9	51	Promotion to Serbia and Montenegro SuperLiga (Note: Voždovac was promoted after merging with Železnik.)
13	Novi Sad	38	15	6	17	43	40	+3	51	
14	OFK Niš	38	13	11	14	39	47	−8	50	
15	Radnički Niš	38	13	10	15	40	44	−4	49	
16	Vlasina	38	15	3	20	45	53	−8	48	
17	Radnički Obrenovac (R)	38	11	10	17	26	50	−24	43	Qualification for relegation play-offs
18	Proleter Zrenjanin (R)	38	11	7	20	38	59	−21	40	Qualification for relegation play-offs
19	Kosanica (R)	38	6	11	21	22	64	−42	29	Relegation to Serbian League
20	Mladost Lučani (R)	38	7	5	26	27	60	−33	26	Relegation to Serbian League

Source: rsssf.org
(C) Champions; (P) Promoted; (R) Relegated

=== Montenegro ===
Pos	Team	Pld	W	D	L	GF	GA	GD	Pts	Promotion or relegation
1	Jedinstvo (C, P)	36	19	11	6	57	26	+31	68	Promotion to Serbia and Montenegro SuperLiga
2	Kom	36	16	10	10	54	30	+24	58	
3	Dečić	36	12	19	5	40	27	+13	55	
4	Rudar	36	13	12	11	38	39	−1	51	
5	Petrovac	36	12	9	15	34	38	−4	45	
6	Mogren	36	11	12	13	40	46	−6	45	
7	Grbalj	36	11	10	15	36	50	−14	43	
8	Bokelj	36	10	11	15	30	40	−10	41	
9	Mornar	36	10	9	17	31	46	−15	39	Qualification for relegation play-offs
10	Mladost (R)	36	9	11	16	31	49	−18	38	Relegation to Montenegrin Republic League

Source: rsssf.org
Rules for classification: 1) points; 2) goal difference; 3) number of goals scored.
(C) Champions; (P) Promoted; (R) Relegated
