= Kemal Omeragić =

Macedonian football manager and player (1931–2014)

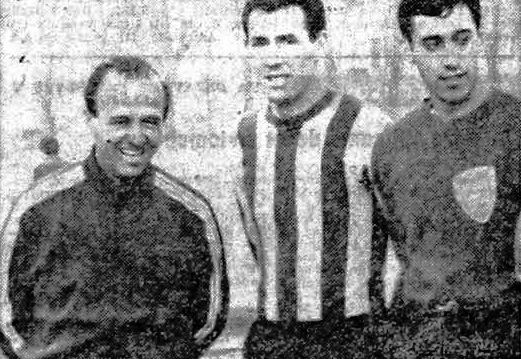
- Omeragić as Maribor manager

Personal information
- Date of birth: 16 September 1931
- Place of birth: Skopje, Kingdom of Yugoslavia
- Date of death: 19 June 2014 (aged 82)
- Place of death: Zrenjanin, Serbia
- Position: Defender

Youth career
- Železničar Zrenjanin

Senior career*
Years	Team	Apps	(Gls)
1954–1960	Proleter Zrenjanin		

Managerial career
- 1964–1965: Rudar Kakanj
- 1965–1968: Proleter Zrenjanin
- 1968–1972: Maribor
- 1973–1974: Priština
- 1974–1976: Altay
- 1976–1978: Bursaspor
- 1980: Maribor
- 1980–1981: Proleter Zrenjanin
- 1981–1982: Altay
- 1982–1984: Bursaspor
- 1985–1986: Altay
- 1986: Priština
- 1986–1987: Bursaspor
- 1987–1989: Proleter Zrenjanin
- 1991–1992: Adana Demirspor
- 1993: Altay
- 1995: Adana Demirspor
- 1995–1996: Yeni Salihlispor
- 1996: Göztepe
- * Club domestic league appearances and goals

Kemal Omeragić (Serbian Cyrillic: Кемал Омерагић; 16 September 1931 – 19 June 2014) was a Macedonian football manager and player.

== Playing career ==
Omeragić played for Proleter Zrenjanin during the 1950s, including two seasons in the Yugoslav Second League from 1958 to 1960. He retired after playing for Rudar Kakanj.

== Managerial career ==
After hanging up his boots, Omeragić started his managerial career at Rudar Kakanj. He subsequently returned to Proleter Zrenjanin as manager, leading them to promotion to the Yugoslav First League for the first time in the club's history in 1967.

During the 1970s and 1980s, Omeragić served as manager of Turkish clubs Altay and Bursaspor on several occasions.

== Honours ==
Proleter Zrenjanin

- Yugoslav Second League: 1966–67 (Group East)
