= 2004–05 Second League of Serbia and Montenegro – Group Serbia =

Second League of Serbia and Montenegro
- Season: 2004–05
- Champions: Budućnost Banatski Dvor
- Promoted: Budućnost Banatski Dvor; Javor Ivanjica; Rad; Voždovac
- Relegated: Radnički Obrenovac; Proleter Zrenjanin; Kosanica; Mladost Lučani
- Matches played: 380
- Goals scored: 886 (2.33 per match)
- Top goalscorer: Srđan Baljak (24 goals)

The 2004–05 Second League of Serbia and Montenegro – Group Serbia (Serbian: Друга лига Србије и Црне Горе 2004/05 – група Србија, Druga liga Srbije i Crne Gore 2004/05 – grupa Srbija) consisted of 20 teams. Two teams were promoted to the Serbia and Montenegro SuperLiga and six were relegated the Serbian League.

== League table ==
Pos	Team	Pld	W	D	L	GF	GA	GD	Pts	Promotion or relegation
1	Budućnost Banatski Dvor (C, P)	38	22	10	6	69	34	+35	76	Promotion to Serbia and Montenegro SuperLiga
2	Javor Ivanjica (P)	38	22	8	8	44	30	+14	74	Promotion to Serbia and Montenegro SuperLiga
3	Rad (P)	38	21	8	9	64	30	+34	71	Promotion to Serbia and Montenegro SuperLiga
4	Mladost Apatin	38	17	12	9	50	31	+19	63	
5	Bežanija	38	17	7	14	59	53	+6	58	
6	Napredak Kruševac	38	14	13	11	46	37	+9	55	
7	Jedinstvo Ub	38	13	14	11	44	35	+9	53	
8	Spartak Subotica	38	13	13	12	53	44	+9	52	
9	Srem	38	15	7	16	50	48	+2	52	
10	Novi Pazar	38	14	10	14	37	39	−2	52	
11	Mačva Šabac	38	14	10	14	44	51	−7	52	
12	Voždovac (P)	38	12	15	11	46	37	+9	51	Promotion to Serbia and Montenegro SuperLiga (Note: Voždovac was promoted after merging with Železnik.)
13	Novi Sad	38	15	6	17	43	40	+3	51	
14	OFK Niš	38	13	11	14	39	47	−8	50	
15	Radnički Niš	38	13	10	15	40	44	−4	49	
16	Vlasina	38	15	3	20	45	53	−8	48	
17	Radnički Obrenovac (R)	38	11	10	17	26	50	−24	43	Qualification for relegation play-offs
18	Proleter Zrenjanin (R)	38	11	7	20	38	59	−21	40	Qualification for relegation play-offs
19	Kosanica (R)	38	6	11	21	22	64	−42	29	Relegation to Serbian League
20	Mladost Lučani (R)	38	7	5	26	27	60	−33	26	Relegation to Serbian League

Source: rsssf.org
(C) Champions; (P) Promoted; (R) Relegated

== Results ==
Home \ Away	BEŽ	BBD	JAV	JED	KOS	MAČ	MAP	MLU	NAP	NPZ	NSD	NIŠ	PRO	RAD	RNI	ROB	SPA	SRM	VLA	VOŽ
Bežanija		1–2	4–0	1–4	0–3	3–1	1–0	2–0	2–3	1–1	2–1	1–2	1–0	3–0	1–3	1–0	1–1	2–1	2–1	2–1
Budućnost Banatski Dvor	1–0		3–0	1–0	0–0	1–3	0–0	3–2	3–0	2–1	2–0	1–0	3–1	2–1	2–0	4–1	1–1	2–2	4–0	2–2
Javor Ivanjica	2–1	1–1		1–0	4–0	0–2	1–0	1–0	1–0	2–0	1–0	2–0	1–0	2–1	1–0	1–1	2–2	2–2	2–1	0–1
Jedinstvo Ub	1–2	3–1	1–1		0–0	3–0	1–1	1–0	2–0	1–0	2–0	3–3	2–0	0–2	1–1	0–0	2–1	3–1	2–1	2–2
Kosanica	1–2	0–5	1–0	0–0		2–2	0–3	2–2	0–0	1–3	0–0	1–2	1–0	0–2	0–2	0–0	0–1	0–2	0–1	2–1
Mačva Šabac	1–1	0–1	0–0	1–0	1–4		1–1	3–1	1–1	2–1	1–0	1–1	4–0	0–2	4–2	1–0	3–0	4–2	1–0	0–1
Mladost Apatin	2–1	1–2	0–0	1–1	3–0	1–1		2–1	1–1	2–0	1–0	2–0	4–0	1–0	4–0	2–0	0–0	2–1	2–1	1–1
Mladost Lučani	2–3	2–4	0–1	1–0	2–0	0–2	0–1		0–2	2–3	0–2	0–0	2–0	1–1	0–1	0–1	1–0	1–0	0–4	0–1
Napredak Kruševac	4–2	1–0	0–1	1–0	1–1	1–0	0–0	4–0		0–0	0–1	1–1	2–2	0–2	3–0	2–1	0–0	5–1	4–0	2–1
Novi Pazar	1–1	1–1	1–0	1–0	0–1	0–0	2–0	3–1	3–3		3–0	1–1	2–1	1–0	1–0	0–1	0–0	1–0	1–0	1–0
Novi Sad	3–2	0–1	1–2	0–1	0–2	4–1	2–1	1–0	0–0	1–0		1–0	5–0	0–3	1–0	6–0	3–2	2–1	2–1	0–1
OFK Niš	1–0	0–2	1–2	1–0	2–1	0–1	2–0	1–2	1–2	1–0	1–1		2–1	2–1	1–2	3–0	1–1	1–0	3–1	0–0
Proleter Zrenjanin	0–1	1–2	1–0	2–0	6–1	2–0	1–2	1–0	0–0	2–1	2–1	0–0		1–3	1–4	3–2	1–1	2–1	1–0	2–2
Rad	2–2	1–1	0–1	3–2	5–0	1–1	3–2	1–1	1–0	2–0	0–0	6–0	0–1		3–0	3–0	3–0	1–0	2–0	3–1
Radnički Niš	0–0	1–0	1–0	1–1	0–0	2–0	1–1	0–0	1–0	0–2	2–2	0–1	2–2	3–1		1–0	2–3	2–0	4–1	1–1
Radnički Obrenovac	0–0	0–0	2–3	1–1	1–0	2–1	0–2	1–0	0–2	1–0	1–0	2–0	1–0	0–0	1–0		0–0	1–4	2–2	0–1
Spartak Subotica	3–2	2–1	0–1	2–2	1–0	5–0	1–1	3–2	2–0	6–0	0–1	1–1	2–0	0–1	2–0	1–1		1–3	3–2	4–1
Srem	1–2	2–1	0–2	0–0	3–1	0–0	2–1	1–0	2–0	2–2	3–2	3–0	3–1	0–0	2–1	3–0	1–0		0–1	1–0
Vlasina	5–3	2–6	0–1	1–2	0–0	1–0	2–0	0–1	3–0	1–0	1–0	3–2	1–0	1–2	0–0	2–0	1–0	2–0		2–0
Voždovac	2–0	1–1	2–2	0–0	4–0	5–0	1–2	4–0	1–1	0–0	0–0	1–1	0–0	1–2	1–0	1–2	3–1	0–0	1–0	

Source: rsssf.org
Legend: Blue = home team win; Yellow = draw; Red = away team win.

== Relegation play-offs ==
First legs were player on 3 July and second legs on 6 July 2005.

Team 1	Agg.	Team 2	1st leg	2nd leg
Sevojno	4–0	Radnički Obrenovac	3–0	1–0
ČSK Čelarevo	2–1	Proleter Zrenjanin	2–1	0–0
