= OFK Kosanica =

Serbian football club

Kosanica
- Full name: Omladinski Fudbalski Klub Kosanica
- Founded: 1928; 98 years ago
- Ground: Stadion Poplava, Kuršumlija
- Capacity: 3,000
- League: Toplica District League
- 2024–25: Toplica District League, 3rd
Home colours	Away colours

OFK Kosanica (Serbian Cyrillic: ОФК Косаница) is a football club based in Kuršumlija, Serbia. They compete in the Toplica District League, the fifth tier of the national league system.

== History ==
After winning the Serbian League East in the 2003–04 season, the club was promoted to the Second League of Serbia and Montenegro. However, they were relegated after only one season, finishing second from the bottom in Group Serbia.

=== Recent league history ===
Season	Division	P	W	D	L	F	A	Pts	Pos
2020–21	4 - Zone League East	28	10	6	12	46	44	36	12th
2021–22	5 - Toplica District League	18	16	1	1	72	12	49	1st
2022–23	4 - Zone League East	28	12	3	13	61	60	39	8th
2023–24	4 - Zone League East	34	15	3	16	61	77	48	12th
2024–25	5 - Toplica District League	16	7	4	5	17	19	25	3rd

== Honours ==
Serbian League East (Tier 3)

- 2003–04

Toplica District League (Tier 5)

- 2010–11, 2013–14, 2021–22
