= Žarko Soldo =

Serbian football manager and player (1953–2011)

Personal information
- Full name: Žarko Soldo
- Date of birth: 14 April 1953
- Place of birth: Zrenjanin, PR Serbia, FPR Yugoslavia
- Date of death: 12 March 2011 (aged 57)
- Place of death: Petrovac, Serbia
- Position: Midfielder

Senior career*
Years	Team	Apps	(Gls)
1971–1986	Proleter Zrenjanin	298	(32)
Total		298	(32)

Managerial career
- 1993–1994: Proleter Zrenjanin
- 1997: Proleter Zrenjanin
- 2002: Inđija
- 2002–2004: Mladost Lukićevo
- 2004–2005: Proleter Zrenjanin
- 2006: Srem
- 2007: Hajduk Kula
- 2007–2008: Banat Zrenjanin
- 2008: Kikinda
- 2009: Banat Zrenjanin
- 2010: Hajduk Kula
- 2011: Timok
- * Club domestic league appearances and goals

Žarko Soldo (Serbian Cyrillic: Жарко Солдо; 14 April 1953 – 12 March 2011) was a Serbian football manager and player.

== Playing career ==
Soldo spent his entire playing career at his hometown club Proleter Zrenjanin, making over 250 league appearances for the side between the early 1970s and late 1980s, mainly in the Yugoslav Second League.

== Managerial career ==
After hanging up his boots, Soldo started his managerial career at Proleter Zrenjanin in the First League of FR Yugoslavia. He later served as manager of numerous clubs in his homeland, including two spells at Serbian SuperLiga sides Hajduk Kula and Banat Zrenjanin.

== Death ==
On 12 March 2011, while serving as manager of Timok, Soldo died during a friendly match due to heart attack at the age of 57.

== Career statistics ==
Appearances and goals by club, season and competition
Club	Season	League		
Club	Season	Division	Apps	Goals
Proleter Zrenjanin	1971–72	Yugoslav Second League	9	0
Proleter Zrenjanin	1972–73	Yugoslav Second League	17	2
Proleter Zrenjanin	1973–74	Yugoslav First League	6	0
Proleter Zrenjanin	1974–75	Yugoslav First League	16	1
Proleter Zrenjanin	1975–76	Yugoslav Second League	20	2
Proleter Zrenjanin	1976–77	Yugoslav Second League	16	1
Proleter Zrenjanin	1977–78	Yugoslav Second League	0	0
Proleter Zrenjanin	1978–79	Yugoslav Second League	20	2
Proleter Zrenjanin	1979–80	Yugoslav Second League	18	3
Proleter Zrenjanin	1980–81	Yugoslav Second League	24	2
Proleter Zrenjanin	1981–82	Yugoslav Second League	26	4
Proleter Zrenjanin	1982–83	Yugoslav Second League	31	3
Proleter Zrenjanin	1983–84	Yugoslav Second League	33	3
Proleter Zrenjanin	1984–85	Yugoslav Second League	33	5
Proleter Zrenjanin	1985–86	Yugoslav Second League	29	4
Proleter Zrenjanin	Total		298	32
