= Timur Akmurzin =

Russian footballer

Personal information
- Full name: Timur Andreyevich Akmurzin
- Date of birth: 7 December 1997 (age 28)
- Place of birth: Moscow, Russia
- Height: 1.89 m (6 ft 2 in)
- Position: Goalkeeper

Team information
- Current team: Dynamo Bryansk
- Number: 1

Youth career
- –2008: FC Lokomotiv Moscow
- 2008–2009: Barcelona
- 2013–2018: Rubin Kazan
- 2019: → Ufa (loan)

Senior career*
Years	Team	Apps	(Gls)
2014–2015	Rubin-2 Kazan	2	(0)
2015–2019	Rubin Kazan	0	(0)
2019	→ Ufa (loan)	0	(0)
2019–2022	Spartak Moscow	0	(0)
2019–2022	Spartak-2 Moscow	74	(0)
2022–2023	Tobol	10	(0)
2023	Veles Moscow	8	(0)
2024	Akron Tolyatti	0	(0)
2024–	Dynamo Bryansk	63	(0)

International career^{‡}
2012	Russia U-15	2	(0)
2012–2013	Russia U-16	7	(0)
2013–2014	Russia U-17	2	(0)
2014–2015	Russia U-18	10	(0)
- * Club domestic league appearances and goals as of 15 November 2026 ‡ National team caps and goals as of 8 June 2015

Timur Andreyevich Akmurzin (Russian: Тимур Андреевич Акмурзин; born 7 December 1997) is a Russian football goalkeeper who plays for Dynamo Bryansk.

== Club career ==
He made his professional debut in the Russian Professional Football League for Rubin-2 Kazan on 18 July 2014 in a game against Syzran-2003 Syzran.

He made his Russian Football National League debut for Spartak-2 Moscow on 7 July 2019 in a game against Baltika Kaliningrad.

On 23 June 2022, Tobol announced the signing of Akmurzin. On 24 July 2023, Akmurzin left Tobol by mutual agreement.
