= Jovo Simanić =

Serbian footballer

Personal information
- Full name: Jovica Simanić
- Date of birth: 8 August 1965 (age 61)
- Place of birth: Zrenjanin, SFR Yugoslavia
- Height: 1.93 m (6 ft 4 in)
- Position: Centre back

Senior career*
Years	Team	Apps	(Gls)
1989–1991	Proleter Zrenjanin	80	(16)
1992–1993	VfB Stuttgart II	18	(2)
1992	VfB Stuttgart	0	(0)
1993–1994	Benfica	0	(0)
1994–1995	Boavista	5	(0)
1995–1996	Famalicão	11	(1)
1996–1997	Ovarense	12	(0)
1997–2000	Proleter Zrenjanin	68	(7)
Total		194	(26)

Managerial career
- 2002: Proleter Zrenjanin
- 2012–2013: Sloga Petrovac
- * Club domestic league appearances and goals

Jovica "Jovo" Simanić (Serbian Cyrillic: Јовица "Јово" Симанић; born 8 August 1965) is a Serbian former professional footballer who played as a central defender.

== Career ==
Born in Zrenjanin in the Socialist Federal Republic of Yugoslavia, Simanić started and ended his 11-year professional career with hometown club Proleter Zrenjanin, scoring 16 goals, but also played abroad in Germany and Portugal. In January 1992, he joined VfB Stuttgart, appearing almost exclusively for the reserve team. On 30 September 1992, in his only appearance for the main squad, a UEFA Champions League play-off match against Leeds United, he was introduced in the last minutes of a 4–1 away loss by manager Christoph Daum, causing Stuttgart to play with one foreign player too many; the Germans would have won on the away goals rule but, after being punished with a 3–0 defeat instead, the two teams had to play a third match, which ended 2–1 for the English side.

Simanić then represented Benfica, being called to the bench twice and Boavista in six Primeira Liga games, after which he competed in the country's second (Famalicão) and third divisions for Ovarense. He returned to his country aged 32 and played for Proleter, retiring from football three years later.
