= 2003–04 Serbia and Montenegro Cup =

Tournament details
- Country: Serbia and Montenegro
- Teams: 32

Final positions
- Champions: Red Star
- Runners-up: Budućnost (BD)

Tournament statistics
- Matches played: 31
- Goals scored: 83 (2.68 per match)

The 2003–04 Serbia and Montenegro Cup was the second and first full season of the Serbia and Montenegro's annual football cup. The cup defenders was FK Sartid, but was defeated by FK Obilić in the second round. Red Star Belgrade has the winner of the competition, after they defeated Budućnost Banatski Dvor. She later clinched the First League title to claim its 8th domestic double.

== First round ==
Thirty-two teams entered in the First Round. The matches were played on 28, 29 October, 11 and 12 November 2003.

Team 1	Score	Team 2
Napredak	1–0	Zeta
Železnik	1–0	Kom
Zeta	1–0	Mladost Apatin (II)
Vojvodina	0–0 (2–4 p)	Jedinstvo Ub (II)
Partizan	4–1	Šumadija 1903 (II)
Hajduk Beograd (II)	2–3	Obilić
Mladost Podgorica (II)	0–0 (0–3 p)	Hajduk Kula
Mogren (II)	1–3	Budućnost Banatski Dvor
Čukarički (II)	2–1	Borac Čačak
Radnički Niš (II)	2–2 (2–4 p)	OFK Beograd
Trepča (IV)	0–0 (0–3 p)	Zemun
Srem (II)	0–0 (2–4 p)	Rad (II)
ČSK Čelarevo (III)	1–2	Javor (II)
Red Star	7–0	Car Konstantin (III)
Radnički Obrenovac	1–3	Radnički Beograd (II)
Rudar (II)	1–3	Sartid

Note: Roman numerals in brackets denote the league tier the clubs participated in the 2003–04 season.

== Second round ==
The 16 winners from the prior round enter this round. The matches were played on 3 December 2003.

Team 1	Score	Team 2
Obilić	1–0	Sartid
Hajduk Kula	2–2 (1–3 p)	Železnik
Budućnost Banatski Dvor	3–0	Napredak
OFK Beograd	2–1	Rad (II)
Partizan	5–2	Čukarički (II)
Radnički Beograd (II)	0–2	Red Star
Jedinstvo Ub (II)	0–1	Zemun
Javor (II)	1–0	Zeta

Note: Roman numerals in brackets denote the league tier the clubs participated in the 2003–04 season.

== Quarter-finals ==
The eight winners from the prior round enter this round. The matches were played on 3 and 24 March 2004.

Team 1	Score	Team 2
Red Star	1–0	Železnik
Obilić	3–3 (5–4 p)	OFK Beograd
Zemun	1–4	Budućnost Banatski Dvor
Javor (II)	0–2	Partizan

Note: Roman numerals in brackets denote the league tier the clubs participated in the 2003–04 season.

== Semi-finals ==
21 April 2004
15:30

Budućnost (BD)	2–1	Obilić
Mitrović 45'; Zafirović 82'		Đorđević 19'

Stadion Mirko Vučurević, Banatski Dvor
Attendance: 500
Referee: Dejan Stanišić (Podgorica)
21 April 2004
16:30

Red Star	1–0	Partizan
Pantelić 14'	Report

Red Star Stadium, Belgrade
Attendance: 30,000
Referee: Dejan Delević (Belgrade)

== Final ==
12 May 2004
17:30

Red Star	1–0	Budućnost (BD)
Žigić 1'	Report

Partizan Stadium, Belgrade
Attendance: 10,000
Referee: Miroslav Radoman (Lovćenac)

== See also ==
- 2003–04 First League of Serbia and Montenegro
- 2003–04 Second League of Serbia and Montenegro
