= Stadion Mirko Vučurević =

Multi-use stadium in Banatski Dvor, Serbia

- Interactive map of Stadion Mirko Vučurević
- Location: Banatski Dvor, Serbia
- Coordinates: 45°31′19.38″N 20°30′58.58″E
- Operator: Budućnost Banatski Dvor
- Capacity: 2,500
- Surface: Grass

Construction
- Opened: September 1998

Tenant
- Budućnost Banatski Dvor (1998–2006)

Stadion Mirko Vučurević (Serbian Cyrillic: Стадион Мирко Вучуревић) is a football stadium in Banatski Dvor, Serbia.

== History ==
The stadium was named after Serbian-Swiss businessman Mirko Vučurević, the owner of Budućnost Banatski Dvor, who financed its construction. The opening ceremony was held in September 1998 and the event was attended by many of Vučurević's friends and colleagues, including politicians Mihalj Kertes, Jovica Stanišić and Milorad Vučelić, among others.
