= 1966–67 Yugoslav Second League =

Yugoslav Second League
- Season: 1966–67
- Champions: Maribor (West Division); Proleter Zrenjanin (East Division)
- Promoted: Maribor; Proleter Zrenjanin
- Relegated: Segesta; Bosna; Istra; Rabotnički; Železničar Niš; Radnički Belgrade

The 1966–67 Yugoslav Second League season was the 21st season of the Second Federal League (Serbo-Croatian: Druga savezna liga), the second level association football competition of SFR Yugoslavia, since its establishment in 1946. The league was contested in two regional groups (West Division and East Division), with 18 clubs each.

== West Division ==
=== Teams ===
A total of eighteen teams contested the league, including fourteen sides from the 1965–66 season, one club relegated from the 1965–66 Yugoslav First League and three sides promoted from the third tier leagues played in the 1965–66 season. The league was contested in a double round robin format, with each club playing every other club twice, for a total of 34 rounds. Two points were awarded for wins and one point for draws.

Trešnjevka were relegated from the 1965–66 Yugoslav First League after finishing in the 16th place of the league table. The three clubs promoted to the second level were Aluminij, Bratstvo Travnik and BSK Slavonski Brod.

Locations of teams' home cities in the 1966–67 Yugoslav Second League West

Team	Location	Federal subject	Position in 1965–66
Aluminij	Kidričevo	SR Slovenia	—
Borac Banja Luka	Banja Luka	SR Bosnia and Herzegovina	12th
Borovo	Borovo Naselje	SR Croatia	3rd
Bosna	Visoko	SR Bosnia and Herzegovina	11th
Bratstvo Travnik	Travnik	SR Bosnia and Herzegovina	—
BSK Slavonski Brod	Slavonski Brod	SR Croatia	—
Famos Hrasnica	Hrasnica	SR Bosnia and Herzegovina	10th
Istra	Pula	SR Croatia	7th
Leotar	Trebinje	SR Bosnia and Herzegovina	9th
Lokomotiva Zagreb	Zagreb	SR Croatia	5th
Maribor	Maribor	SR Slovenia	4th
Osijek	Osijek	SR Croatia	8th
Rudar Kakanj	Kakanj	SR Bosnia and Herzegovina	15th
Segesta	Sisak	SR Croatia	13th
Sloboda	Tuzla	SR Bosnia and Herzegovina	2nd
Šibenik	Šibenik	SR Croatia	6th
Trešnjevka	Zagreb	SR Croatia	—
Varteks	Varaždin	SR Croatia	14th

=== League table ===
Pos	Team	Pld	W	D	L	GF	GA	GD	Pts	Promotion or relegation
1	Maribor (C, P)	34	23	10	1	67	17	+50	56	Promotion to Yugoslav First League
2	Osijek	34	18	8	8	60	35	+25	44	
3	Sloboda Tuzla	34	19	6	9	53	28	+25	44	
4	Lokomotiva Zagreb	34	16	8	10	56	47	+9	40	
5	Šibenik	34	13	10	11	43	42	+1	36	
6	Bratstvo Travnik	34	13	9	12	45	53	−8	35	
7	Leotar	34	12	10	12	43	44	−1	34	
8	Borovo	34	9	15	10	52	38	+14	33	
9	Trešnjevka	34	12	9	13	45	39	+6	33	
10	Rudar Kakanj	34	11	11	12	34	40	−6	33	
11	Aluminij	34	12	8	14	39	44	−5	32	
12	Famos Hrasnica	34	11	9	14	48	57	−9	31	
13	BSK Slavonski Brod	34	12	7	15	45	57	−12	31	
14	Varteks	34	9	12	13	35	34	+1	30	
15	Borac Banja Luka	34	12	6	16	44	59	−15	30	
16	Segesta (R)	34	12	6	16	54	74	−20	30	Relegation to Third Level
17	Bosna (R)	34	5	12	17	34	52	−18	22	Relegation to Third Level
18	Istra Pula (R)	34	5	8	21	37	74	−37	18	Relegation to Third Level

Source: fsgzrenjanin.com
Rules for classification: 1) points; 2) goal difference; 3) number of goals scored.
(C) Champions; (P) Promoted; (R) Relegated

== East Division ==
=== Teams ===
A total of eighteen teams contested the league, including fourteen sides from the 1965–66 season, one club relegated from the 1965–66 Yugoslav First League and three sides promoted from the third tier leagues played in the 1965–66 season. The league was contested in a double round robin format, with each club playing every other club twice, for a total of 34 rounds. Two points were awarded for wins and one point for draws.

Radnički Belgrade were relegated from the 1965–66 Yugoslav First League after finishing in the 15th place of the league table. The three clubs promoted to the second level were Crvenka, Rabotnički and Radnički Kragujevac.

Locations of teams' home cities in the 1966–67 Yugoslav Second League East

Team	Location	Federal subject	Position in 1965–66
Bačka	Bačka Palanka	(Socialist Republic of Serbia) SAP Vojvodina	13th
Bor	Bor	SR Serbia	4th
Borac Čačak	Čačak	SR Serbia	15th
Budućnost	Titograd	SR Montenegro	9th
Crvenka	Crvenka	(Socialist Republic of Serbia) SAP Vojvodina	—
Lovćen	Cetinje	SR Montenegro	14th
Pobeda	Prilep	SR Macedonia	3rd
Prishtina	Pristina	(Socialist Republic of Serbia) SAP Kosovo	10th
Proleter Zrenjanin	Zrenjanin	(Socialist Republic of Serbia) SAP Vojvodina	2nd
Rabotnički	Skopje	SR Macedonia	—
Radnički Belgrade	Belgrade	SR Serbia	—
Radnički Kragujevac	Kragujevac	SR Serbia	—
Radnički Sombor	Sombor	(Socialist Republic of Serbia) SAP Vojvodina	5th
Sloboda Titovo Užice	Titovo Užice	SR Serbia	12th
Spartak Subotica	Subotica	(Socialist Republic of Serbia) SAP Vojvodina	7th
Trepča	Kosovska Mitrovica	(Socialist Republic of Serbia) SAP Kosovo	8th
Voždovački	Belgrade	SR Serbia	6th
Železničar Niš	Niš	SR Serbia	11th

=== League table ===
Pos	Team	Pld	W	D	L	GF	GA	GD	Pts	Promotion or relegation
1	Proleter Zrenjanin (C, P)	34	21	6	7	79	40	+39	48	Promotion to Yugoslav First League
2	Prishtina	34	17	5	12	56	43	+13	39	
3	Radnički Sombor	34	15	7	12	49	53	−4	37	
4	Trepča	34	15	6	13	67	62	+5	36	
5	Spartak Subotica	33	14	7	12	39	39	0	35	
6	Voždovački	34	12	11	11	54	54	0	35	
7	Sloboda Titovo Užice	34	11	13	10	41	48	−7	35	
8	Bor	34	13	9	12	32	42	−10	35	
9	Pobeda	34	14	7	13	46	60	−14	35	
10	Budućnost	34	13	8	13	43	30	+13	34	
11	Radnički Kragujevac	34	14	6	14	65	57	+8	34	
12	Borac Čačak	34	11	11	12	42	41	+1	33	
13	Lovćen	34	11	11	12	29	38	−9	33	
14	Crvenka	34	11	10	13	57	57	0	32	
15	Bačka	34	12	7	15	53	49	+4	31	
16	Rabotnichki (R)	34	13	5	16	66	69	−3	31	Relegation to Third Level
17	Železničar Niš (R)	34	10	8	16	52	58	−6	28	Relegation to Third Level
18	Radnički Beograd (R)	34	7	6	21	37	67	−30	20	Relegation to Third Level

Source: fsgzrenjanin.com
Rules for classification: 1) points; 2) goal difference; 3) number of goals scored.
(C) Champions; (P) Promoted; (R) Relegated

== See also ==
- 1966–67 Yugoslav First League
- 1966–67 Yugoslav Cup
