= FK Budućnost Banatski Dvor =

Serbian football club (1929–2006)

Budućnost Banatski Dvor
- Full name: Fudbalski Klub Budućnost
- Founded: 1929; 97 years ago
- Dissolved: 2006 (became FK Banat Zrenjanin)
- Ground: Stadion Mirko Vučurević, Banatski Dvor
- Capacity: 2,500
- 2005–06: First League of Serbia and Montenegro, 8th of 16
Home colours	Away colours

FK Budućnost Banatski Dvor (Serbian Cyrillic: ФК Будућност Банатски Двор) was a football club based in Banatski Dvor, Vojvodina, Serbia. They competed in the First League of Serbia and Montenegro for two seasons in 2003–04 and 2005–06. The club also reached the final of the 2003–04 Serbia and Montenegro Cup, securing a spot in the 2004–05 UEFA Cup.

== History ==
Founded in 1929, the club began to climb up the leagues during the 1990s under the ownership of Yugoslav-Swiss businessman Mirko Vučurević. They placed first in each season between 1995–96 and 1998–99, earning four consecutive promotions to reach the Serbian League Vojvodina. The club subsequently finished as runners-up in the third tier and gained promotion to the Second League of FR Yugoslavia.

At the beginning of the new millennium, the club reached the quarter-finals of the FR Yugoslavia Cup in the 2000–01 season and the semi-finals two years later, losing to Red Star Belgrade on both occasions. They also won the Second League (Group North) in the 2002–03 season and took promotion to the First League of Serbia and Montenegro for the first time in history. However, the club was promptly relegated from the top flight, but managed to reach the final of the 2003–04 Serbia and Montenegro Cup, losing 1–0 to Red Star Belgrade. As a result, they earned a spot in the 2004–05 UEFA Cup, but were eliminated by Slovenian side Maribor on the away goals rule in the second qualifying round. The same season, the club earned promotion back to the top flight.

=== Banat Zrenjanin ===
In January 2006, following the cessation of Proleter Zrenjanin, it was reported that Budućnost Banatski Dvor became Banat Zrenjanin. However, the club's transformation was finalized after the 2005–06 season.

== Honours ==
Second League of Serbia and Montenegro (Tier 2)

- 2002–03 (Group North), 2004–05 (Group Serbia)

Vojvodina League East (Tier 4)

- 1998–99

== Seasons ==
Season	League									Cup	Continental
Season	Division	Pld	W	D	L	GF	GA	Pts	Pos	Cup	Continental
Serbia and Montenegro
1999–2000	3 – Vojvodina	40	28	6	6	95	26	90	2nd	Round of 16	—
2000–01	2 – North	34	15	10	9	53	47	55	6th	Quarter-finals	—
2001–02	2 – North	34	22	5	7	74	30	71	2nd	—	—
2002–03	2 – North	33	22	10	1	55	18	76	1st	Semi-finals	—
2003–04	1	30	10	4	16	30	49	34	13th	Runners-up	—
2004–05	2 – Serbia	38	22	10	6	69	34	76	1st	Round of 16	UEFA Cup – Second qualifying round
2005–06	1	30	13	5	12	34	31	44	8th	Round of 32	—

== European record ==
Season	Competition	Round	Opponent	Score	Aggregate
2004–05	UEFA Cup	Second qualifying round	(Slovenia) Maribor	1–2 (H), 1–0 (A)	2–2

== Notable players ==
This is a list of players who have played at full international level.

- (Montenegro) Nikola Drinčić
- (Serbia) Nikola Beljić
- (Serbia) Zoran Tošić
- (Serbia and Montenegro) Nenad Kovačević

For a list of all FK Budućnost Banatski Dvor players with a Wikipedia article, see Category:FK Budućnost Banatski Dvor players.

== Managerial history ==
Period	Name
2002	(Serbia and Montenegro) Josif Ilić
2002–2003	(Serbia and Montenegro) Blagoje Paunović
2003–2004	(Serbia and Montenegro) Jovan Kovrlija
2004	(Serbia and Montenegro) Milan Budisavljević (caretaker)
2004	(Serbia and Montenegro) Miroslav Vukašinović
2004–2005	(Serbia and Montenegro) Radivoje Drašković
2005–2006	(Serbia and Montenegro) Nikola Rakojević
