= FK Proleter Zrenjanin =

Serbian football club

Proleter Zrenjanin
- Full name: Fudbalski klub Proleter Zrenjanin
- Founded: 27 June 1947; 79 years ago
- Dissolved: 11 December 2005
- Ground: Stadion Karađorđev park, Zrenjanin
- Capacity: 8,500
- 2005–06: Serbian League Vojvodina (withdrew)
Home colours	Away colours

FK Proleter Zrenjanin (Serbian Cyrillic: ФК Пролетер Зрењанин) was a football club based in Zrenjanin, Vojvodina, Serbia.

== History ==
The club was founded on 27 June 1947 by the merger of three local rivals. Their first notable result was reaching the quarter-finals of the 1951 Yugoslav Cup, where they were heavily defeated by Dinamo Zagreb (8–0).

In 1958, the club joined the reformed Yugoslav Second League, competing in Group East for two seasons. They promptly returned to the league in 1961, spending the next six seasons in the second tier. In 1966–67, the club finished as champions and earned promotion to the Yugoslav First League for the first time ever. They placed eight in their debut appearance in the top flight. The club subsequently ended bottom of the table in 1968–69 and dropped to the Second League.

In 1973, the club returned to the Yugoslav First League. They spent two seasons in the top flight, but suffered relegation in 1974–75. The club went on to compete in the Second League until 1990. They ended their comeback season in fourth place, their highest ever league finish.

After the breakup of Yugoslavia in 1992, the club competed in the First League of FR Yugoslavia for eight consecutive seasons. They placed fifth in the 1996–97 season, qualifying for the UEFA Intertoto Cup. The club was relegated to the Second League in 1999–2000. They were soon relegated to the Serbian League Vojvodina in 2002. The club was dissolved on 11 December 2005.

== Honours ==
Yugoslav Second League (Tier 2)

- 1966–67 (Group East), 1970–71 (Group East)

Serbian League Vojvodina (Tier 3)

- 2002–03

== European record ==
Season	Competition	Round	Opponent	Score	Aggregate
1997–98	Intertoto Cup	Group stage	(Israel) Maccabi Haifa	4–0 (H)	3rd of 5
1997–98	Intertoto Cup	Group stage	(Russia) Lokomotiv Nizhny Novgorod	0–1 (A)	3rd of 5
1997–98	Intertoto Cup	Group stage	(Slovenia) Publikum Celje	0–0 (H)	3rd of 5
1997–98	Intertoto Cup	Group stage	(Turkey) Antalyaspor	0–1 (A)	3rd of 5

== Notable players ==
This is a list of players who have played at full international level.

- (Bosnia and Herzegovina) Nenad Mišković
- (Bosnia and Herzegovina) Amir Teljigović
- (Montenegro) (Serbia and Montenegro) Marko Baša
- (Montenegro) Vladimir Božović
- (North Macedonia) Milan Stojanoski
- (Serbia and Montenegro) Slobodan Dubajić
- (Serbia and Montenegro) Dejan Govedarica
- (Serbia and Montenegro) Ilija Ivić
- (Serbia and Montenegro) Vladimir Ivić
- (Serbia and Montenegro) Darko Kovačević
- (Serbia and Montenegro) Zvonimir Vukić
- (Slovenia) Aleksandar Rodić
- (Slovenia) Zlatko Zahovič
- (Socialist Federal Republic of Yugoslavia) Radoslav Bečejac
- (Socialist Federal Republic of Yugoslavia) Nenad Bjeković
- (Socialist Federal Republic of Yugoslavia) Milan Galić
- (Socialist Federal Republic of Yugoslavia) Anton Herceg
- (Socialist Federal Republic of Yugoslavia) Bela Palfi
- (Socialist Federal Republic of Yugoslavia) Božidar Sandić
- (Socialist Federal Republic of Yugoslavia) Todor Veselinović

For a list of all FK Proleter Zrenjanin players with a Wikipedia article, see Category:FK Proleter Zrenjanin players.

== Managerial history ==
Period	Name
	(Socialist Federal Republic of Yugoslavia) Branislav Hrnjiček
1963-1964	(Socialist Federal Republic of Yugoslavia) Ratomir Čabrić
	(Socialist Federal Republic of Yugoslavia) Boris Marović
1965-1968	(Socialist Federal Republic of Yugoslavia) Kemal Omeragić
1968-1969	(Socialist Federal Republic of Yugoslavia) Bela Palfi
	(Socialist Federal Republic of Yugoslavia) Mladen Kašanin
	(Socialist Federal Republic of Yugoslavia) Tomislav Manojlović
1972-1974	(Socialist Federal Republic of Yugoslavia) Miloš Milutinović
	(Socialist Federal Republic of Yugoslavia) Tomislav Manojlović
1980-1981	(Socialist Federal Republic of Yugoslavia) Kemal Omeragić
	(Socialist Federal Republic of Yugoslavia) Tomislav Manojlović
1984-1985	(Socialist Federal Republic of Yugoslavia) Bela Palfi
1985-1986	(Socialist Federal Republic of Yugoslavia) Milan Đuričić
1987-1989	(Socialist Federal Republic of Yugoslavia) Kemal Omeragić
	(Socialist Federal Republic of Yugoslavia) Tomislav Manojlović
1991–1993	(Federal Republic of Yugoslavia) Radivoje Drašković
1993–1994	(Federal Republic of Yugoslavia) Žarko Soldo

Period	Name
1994	(Federal Republic of Yugoslavia) Miloš Vidović
1994	(Federal Republic of Yugoslavia) Dragan Škorić
1994	(Federal Republic of Yugoslavia) Miloš Vidović
1994–1996	(Federal Republic of Yugoslavia) Tomislav Manojlović
1996–1997	(Federal Republic of Yugoslavia) Radivoje Drašković
1997	(Federal Republic of Yugoslavia) Tomislav Manojlović
1997	(Federal Republic of Yugoslavia) Žarko Soldo
1997–1998	(Federal Republic of Yugoslavia) Miloljub Ostojić
1998–1999	(Federal Republic of Yugoslavia) Radivoje Drašković
1999–2000	(Federal Republic of Yugoslavia) Zlatomir Mićanović
2002	(Federal Republic of Yugoslavia) Jovo Simanić
2002–2003	(Serbia and Montenegro) Zlatomir Mićanović
2003	(Serbia and Montenegro) Milan Rađenović (caretaker)
2003–2004	(Serbia and Montenegro) Rade Vešović
2004–2005	(Serbia and Montenegro) Žarko Soldo
