= UEFA Euro 2000 statistics =

Football tournament statistics

These are the statistics for UEFA Euro 2000, held in Belgium and Netherlands.

== Goalscorers ==
There were 85 goals scored in 31 matches, for an average of 2.74 goals per match.

5 goals

- (Federal Republic of Yugoslavia) Savo Milošević
- (Netherlands) Patrick Kluivert

4 goals

- (Portugal) Nuno Gomes

3 goals

- (France) Thierry Henry
- (Portugal) Sérgio Conceição
- (Slovenia) Zlatko Zahovič

2 goals

- (Czech Republic) Vladimír Šmicer
- (England) Alan Shearer
- (France) Youri Djorkaeff
- (France) David Trezeguet
- (France) Sylvain Wiltord
- (France) Zinedine Zidane
- (Italy) Filippo Inzaghi
- (Italy) Francesco Totti
- (Netherlands) Frank de Boer
- (Netherlands) Marc Overmars
- (Netherlands) Boudewijn Zenden
- (Spain) Alfonso
- (Spain) Gaizka Mendieta
- (Turkey) Hakan Şükür

1 goal

- (Belgium) Bart Goor
- (Belgium) Émile Mpenza
- (Czech Republic) Karel Poborský
- (England) Steve McManaman
- (England) Michael Owen
- (England) Paul Scholes
- (Federal Republic of Yugoslavia) Ljubinko Drulović
- (Federal Republic of Yugoslavia) Dejan Govedarica
- (Federal Republic of Yugoslavia) Slobodan Komljenović
- (France) Laurent Blanc
- (France) Christophe Dugarry
- (Germany) Mehmet Scholl
- (Italy) Antonio Conte
- (Italy) Alessandro Del Piero
- (Italy) Marco Delvecchio
- (Italy) Luigi Di Biagio
- (Italy) Stefano Fiore
- (Netherlands) Ronald de Boer
- (Norway) Steffen Iversen
- (Portugal) Costinha
- (Portugal) Luís Figo
- (Portugal) João Pinto
- (Romania) Cristian Chivu
- (Romania) Ionel Ganea
- (Romania) Viorel Moldovan
- (Romania) Dorinel Munteanu
- (Slovenia) Miran Pavlin
- (Spain) Joseba Etxeberria
- (Spain) Pedro Munitis
- (Spain) Raúl
- (Sweden) Henrik Larsson
- (Sweden) Johan Mjällby
- (Turkey) Okan Buruk

1 own goal

- (Federal Republic of Yugoslavia) Dejan Govedarica (against Netherlands)

Source: UEFA

== Assists ==
4 assists

- (Federal Republic of Yugoslavia) Ljubinko Drulovic

3 assists

- (England) David Beckham
- (Netherlands) Dennis Bergkamp
- (Portugal) Rui Costa
- (Portugal) Luís Figo

2 assists

- (France) Patrick Vieira
- (Italy) Demetrio Albertini
- (Netherlands) Boudewijn Zenden
- (Portugal) Capucho

1 assist

- (Belgium) Branko Strupar
- (Czech Republic) Jan Koller
- (Czech Republic) Karel Poborsky
- (England) Paul Scholes
- (Spain) Gaizka Mendieta
- (Spain) Raúl González
- (Spain) Ismael Urzáiz
- (France) Nicolas Anelka
- (France) Thierry Henry
- (France) David Trezeguet
- (France) Robert Pires
- (France) Johan Micoud
- (France) Sylvain Wiltord
- (France) Zinedine Zidane
- (Germany) Paulo Rink
- (Italy) Alessandro Del Piero
- (Italy) Stefano Fiore
- (Italy) Filippo Inzaghi
- (Italy) Gianluca Pessotto
- (Netherlands) Edgar Davids
- (Netherlands) Michael Reiziger
- (Netherlands) Sander Westerveld
- (Norway) Thomas Myhre
- (Portugal) Sérgio Conceição
- (Portugal) Pauleta
- (Romania) Adrian Ilie
- (Slovenia) Aleš Čeh
- (Slovenia) Mladen Rudonja
- (Slovenia) Zlatko Zahovic
- (Sweden) Kennet Andersson
- (Turkey) Suat Kaya
- (Turkey) Sergen Yalçin
- (Federal Republic of Yugoslavia) Miroslav Djukic
- (Federal Republic of Yugoslavia) Predrag Mijatovic

== Best goalkeepers ==
3 clean sheets

- (Italy) Francesco Toldo
- (Netherlands) Edwin van der Sar

2 clean sheets

- (Norway) Thomas Myhre
- (Portugal) Vítor Baía
- (Turkey) Rüştü Reçber

1 clean sheet

- (Czech Republic) Pavel Srníček
- (England) David Seaman
- (France) Fabien Barthez
- (Portugal) Pedro Espinha (Note: Quim was substituted on for Pedro Espinha in the 90th minute of Portugal's 3–0 win in Group A against Germany)
- (Portugal) Quim
- (Slovenia) Mladen Dabanovič
- (Sweden) Magnus Hedman
- (Federal Republic of Yugoslavia) Ivica Kralj

Source: statbunker

== Awards ==
UEFA Best XI of the Tournament

| Goalkeepers | Defenders | Midfielders | Forwards |
|---|---|---|---|
| (France) Fabien Barthez (Italy) Francesco Toldo | (France) Laurent Blanc (France) Marcel Desailly (France) Lilian Thuram (Italy) Fabio Cannavaro (Italy) Paolo Maldini (Italy) Alessandro Nesta (Netherlands) Frank de Boer | (France) Patrick Vieira (France) Zinedine Zidane (Italy) Demetrio Albertini (Netherlands) Edgar Davids (Portugal) Rui Costa (Portugal) Luís Figo (Spain) Pep Guardiola | (Federal Republic of Yugoslavia) Savo Milošević (France) Thierry Henry (Italy) Francesco Totti (Netherlands) Patrick Kluivert (Portugal) Nuno Gomes (Spain) Raúl |

Golden Boot

- (Federal Republic of Yugoslavia) Savo Milošević (5 goals)
- (Netherlands) Patrick Kluivert (5 goals)

UEFA Player of the Tournament

- (France) Zinedine Zidane

=== Man of the Match ===
| Rank | Player | Team | Opponent(s) | Awards |
|---|---|---|---|---|
| 1 | Thierry Henry | France | vs Denmark (GS), vs Czech Republic (GS), vs Italy (F) | 3 |
| 2 | Luis Figo | Portugal | vs England (GS), vs Turkey (QF) | 2 |
| 2 | Erik Mykland | Norway | vs Spain (GS), vs Slovenia (GS) | 2 |
| 2 | Zinedine Zidane | France | vs Spain (QF), vs Portugal (SF) | 2 |
| 5 | Frank de Boer | Netherlands | vs Denmark (GS) | 1 |
| 5 | Sérgio Conceição | Portugal | vs Germany (GS) | 1 |
| 5 | Fernando Couto | Portugal | vs Romania (GS) | 1 |
| 5 | Edgar Davids | Netherlands | vs France (GS) | 1 |
| 5 | Pep Guardiola | Spain | vs FR Yugoslavia (GS) | 1 |
| 5 | Filippo Inzaghi | Italy | vs Turkey (GS) | 1 |
| 5 | Patrick Kluivert | Netherlands | vs FR Yugoslavia (QF) | 1 |
| 5 | Henrik Larsson | Sweden | vs Italy (GS) | 1 |
| 5 | Freddie Ljungberg | Sweden | vs Turkey (GS) | 1 |
| 5 | Émile Mpenza | Belgium | vs Sweden (GS) | 1 |
| 5 | Dorinel Munteanu | Romania | vs England (GS) | 1 |
| 5 | Pavel Nedvěd | Czech Republic | vs Netherlands (GS) | 1 |
| 5 | Alessandro Nesta | Italy | vs Romania (QF) | 1 |
| 5 | Raúl | Spain | vs Slovenia (GS) | 1 |
| 5 | Mehmet Scholl | Germany | vs Romania (GS) | 1 |
| 5 | Alan Shearer | England | vs Germany (GS) | 1 |
| 5 | Vladimír Šmicer | Czech Republic | vs Denmark (GS) | 1 |
| 5 | Dragan Stojković | (Federal Republic of Yugoslavia) | vs Norway (GS) | 1 |
| 5 | Hakan Şükür | Turkey | vs Belgium (GS) | 1 |
| 5 | Francesco Toldo | Italy | vs Netherlands (SF) | 1 |
| 5 | Francesco Totti | Italy | vs Belgium (GS) | 1 |
| 5 | Zlatko Zahovič | Slovenia | vs FR Yugoslavia (GS) | 1 |

Source: UEFA Technical Study Group

== Scoring ==
Overview

- Total number of goals scored: 85
- Average goals per match: 2.74
- Total number of braces: 3
  Nuno Gomes, Savo Milošević, Vladimír Šmicer
- Total number of hat-tricks: 2
  Sérgio Conceição, Patrick Kluivert
- Total number of penalty kicks awarded: 12
- Total number of penalty kicks scored: 8
  * (England) Alan Shearer in a match against Romania
- (Romania) Ionel Ganea in a match against England
- (Italy) Filippo Inzaghi in a match against Turkey
- (Spain) Gaizka Mendieta in a match against FR Yugoslavia
- (Netherlands) Frank de Boer in a match against Czech Republic
- (Czech Republic) Karel Poborský in a match against France
- (Spain) Gaizka Mendieta in a match against France
- (France) Zinedine Zidane in a match against Portugal
- Total number of penalty kicks missed or saved: 4
  * (Turkey) Arif Erdem in a match against Portugal, stopped by Vítor Baía
- (Spain) Raúl in a match against France, over the bar
- (Netherlands) Frank de Boer in a match against Italy, stopped by Francesco Toldo
- (Netherlands) Patrick Kluivert in a match against Italy, hit the post
- Penalty kick success rate: 66.67%
- Own goals scored: 1
  Dejan Govedarica
- Average goals per match: 2.74
- Top scorer(s): 5 - (Netherlands) Patrick Kluivert, (Federal Republic of Yugoslavia) Savo Milošević
- Most goals scored by a team: 13 – Netherlands, France
- Fewest goals scored by a team: 0 – Denmark
- Most goals conceded by a team: 13 – FR Yugoslavia
- Fewest goals conceded by a team: 1 – Norway
- First goal of the tournament: (Belgium) Bart Goor vs. Sweden
- Last goal of the tournament: (France) David Trezeguet vs. Italy
- Fastest goal in a match: 3 minutes – (England) Paul Scholes vs. Portugal
- Latest goal in a match without extra time: 90+6 minutes – (Spain) Alfonso vs. FR Yugoslavia
- Latest goal in a match with extra time: 117 minutes – (France) Zinedine Zidane vs. Portugal

== Wins and losses ==
- Most wins: 5 - France, Italy
- Fewest wins: 0 - Denmark, Germany, Slovenia, Sweden
- Most losses: 3 - Denmark
- Fewest losses: - 0 - Netherlands

== Discipline ==
Sanctions against foul play at UEFA Euro 2000 are in the first instance the responsibility of the referee, but when he deems it necessary to give a caution, or dismiss a player, UEFA keeps a record and may enforce a suspension. Referee decisions are generally seen as final. However, UEFA's disciplinary committee may additionally penalise players for offences unpunished by the referee.

=== Overview ===
==== Red cards ====
A player receiving a red card is automatically suspended for the next match. A longer suspension is possible if the UEFA disciplinary committee judges the offence as warranting it. In keeping with the FIFA Disciplinary Code (FDC) and UEFA Disciplinary Regulations (UDR), UEFA does not allow for appeals of red cards except in the case of mistaken identity. The FDC further stipulates that if a player is sent off during his team's final Euro 2008 match, the suspension carries over to his team's next competitive international(s). For Euro 2000 these were the qualification matches for the 2002 FIFA World Cup.

Any player who was suspended due to a red card that was earned in Euro 2000 qualifying was required to serve the balance of any suspension unserved by the end of qualifying either in the Euro 2000 finals (for any player on a team that qualified, whether he had been selected to the final squad or not) or in World Cup qualifying (for players on teams that did not qualify).

==== Yellow cards ====
Any player receiving a single yellow card during two of the three group stage matches plus the quarter-final match was suspended for the next match. A single yellow card does not carry over to the semi-finals. This means that no player will be suspended for final unless he gets sent off in semi-final or he is serving a longer suspension for an earlier incident. Suspensions due to yellow cards will not carry over to the World Cup qualifiers. Yellow cards and any related suspensions earned in the Euro 2004 qualifiers are neither counted nor enforced in the final tournament.

In the event a player is sent off for two bookable offences, only the red card is counted for disciplinary purposes. However, in the event a player receives a direct red card after being booked in the same match, then both cards are counted. If the player was already facing a suspension for two tournament bookings when he was sent off, this would result in separate suspensions that would be served consecutively. The one match ban for the yellow cards would be served first unless the player's team is eliminated in the match in which he was sent off. If the player's team is eliminated in the match in which he was serving his ban for the yellow cards, then the ban for the sending off would be carried over to the World Cup qualifiers.

==== Additional punishment ====
For serious transgressions, a longer suspension may be handed down at the discretion of the UEFA disciplinary committee. The disciplinary committee is also charged with reviewing any incidents that were missed by the officials and can award administrative red cards and suspensions accordingly. However, just as appeals of red cards are not considered, the disciplinary committee is also not allowed to review transgressions that were already punished by the referee with something less than a red card. For example, if a player is booked but not sent off for a dangerous tackle, the disciplinary committee cannot subsequently deem the challenge to be violent conduct and then upgrade the card to a red. However, if the same player then spits at the opponent but is still not sent off, then the referee's report would be unlikely to mention this automatic red card offence. Video evidence of the spitting incident could then be independently reviewed.

Unlike the rules in many domestic competitions, there is no particular category of red card offence that automatically results in a multi-game suspension. In general however, extended bans are only assessed for red cards given for serious foul play, violent conduct, spitting or perhaps foul and abusive language. Also, unlike many sets of domestic rules second and subsequent red cards also do not automatically incur an extended ban, although a player's past disciplinary record (including prior competition) might be considered by the disciplinary committee when punishing him. As a rule, only automatic red card offenses are considered for longer bans. A player who gets sent off for picking up two yellow cards in the same match will not have his automatic one-match ban extended by UEFA on account of what he did to get the second booking, because the referee has deemed him as not to have committed an automatic red card offense.

If UEFA suspends a player after his team's elimination from the tournament, or for more games than the team ends up playing without him prior to the final or their elimination (whichever comes first), then the remaining suspension must be served during World Cup qualifying. For a particularly grave offence UEFA has the power to impose a lengthy ban against the offender.

=== Disciplinary statistics ===
- Total number of yellow cards (yellow card) : 122
- Average yellow cards per match: 3.93
- Total number of red cards (red card) : 10
- Average red cards per match: 0.32
- First yellow card: Gheorghe Hagi and Adrian Ilie against Germany
- First red card: Patrik Andersson against Belgium
- Most yellow cards: 13 – Netherlands Portugal
- Fewest yellow cards: 2 – Sweden
- Most yellow cards in a match: 9 - Italy vs. Netherlands

=== By individual ===
==== Red cards ====
Ten red cards were shown over the course of the tournament's 31 matches, an average of 0.32 red cards per match.

1 red card

- (Belgium) Filip De Wilde
- (Czech Republic) Radoslav Látal
- (Italy) Gianluca Zambrotta
- (Portugal) Nuno Gomes
- (Romania) Gheorghe Hagi
- (Sweden) Patrik Andersson
- (Turkey) Alpay Özalan
- (Federal Republic of Yugoslavia) Slaviša Jokanović
- (Federal Republic of Yugoslavia) Mateja Kežman
- (Federal Republic of Yugoslavia) Siniša Mihajlović

==== Yellow cards ====
122 yellow cards were shown over the course of the tournament's 31 matches, an average of 3.94 yellow cards per match

3 yellow cards

- (Netherlands) Giovanni van Bronckhorst
- (Romania) Gheorghe Hagi

2 yellow cards

- (Czech Republic) Karel Poborský
- (France) Marcel Desailly
- (France) Lillian Thuram
- (France) Patrick Vieira
- (Italy) Luigi Di Biagio
- (Italy) Gianluca Zambrotta
- (Netherlands) Edgar Davids
- (Portugal) Luís Figo
- (Portugal) João Pinto
- (Romania) Gheorghe Hagi
- (Romania) Adrian Ilie
- (Romania) Dan Petrescu
- (Slovenia) Darko Milanič
- (Slovenia) Miran Pavlin
- (Federal Republic of Yugoslavia) Slaviša Jokanović
- (Federal Republic of Yugoslavia) Siniša Mihajlović

1 yellow card

- (Belgium) Mbo Mpenza
- (Belgium) Luc Nilis
- (Belgium) Nico Van Kerckhoven
- (Belgium) Yves Vanderhaeghe
- (Belgium) Gert Verheyen
- (Belgium) Marc Wilmots
- (Czech Republic) Milan Fukal
- (Czech Republic) Petr Gabriel
- (Czech Republic) Marek Jankulovski
- (Czech Republic) Pavel Nedvěd
- (Czech Republic) Jiří Němec
- (Czech Republic) Karel Rada
- (Czech Republic) Tomáš Řepka
- (Denmark) Jesper Grønkjær
- (Denmark) Miklos Molnar
- (Denmark) Allan Nielsen
- (Denmark) Michael Schjønberg
- (Denmark) Stig Tøfting
- (England) David Beckham
- (England) Paul Ince
- (England) Alan Shearer
- (France) Didier Deschamps
- (France) Christophe Dugarry
- (Germany) Markus Babbel
- (Germany) Michael Ballack
- (Germany) Carsten Jancker
- (Germany) Jens Jeremies
- (Germany) Paulo Rink
- (Italy) Demetrio Albertini
- (Italy) Fabio Cannavaro
- (Italy) Antonio Conte
- (Italy) Mark Iuliano

1 yellow card (cont.)

- (Italy) Paolo Maldini
- (Italy) Francesco Toldo
- (Italy) Francesco Totti
- (Netherlands) Paul Bosvelt
- (Netherlands) Phillip Cocu
- (Netherlands) Frank de Boer
- (Netherlands) Bert Konterman
- (Netherlands) Michael Reiziger
- (Netherlands) Jaap Stam
- (Netherlands) Edwin van der Sar
- (Netherlands) Boudewijn Zenden
- (Portugal) Vítor Baía
- (Portugal) Beto
- (Portugal) Costinha
- (Portugal) Jorge Costa
- (Portugal) Rui Costa
- (Portugal) Fernando Couto
- (Portugal) Paulo Sousa
- (Portugal) Dimas Teixeira
- (Portugal) Luís Vidigal
- (Romania) Cristian Chivu
- (Romania) Cosmin Contra
- (Romania) Iulian Filipescu
- (Slovenia) Amir Karič
- (Slovenia) Džoni Novak
- (Spain) Alfonso
- (Spain) Agustín Aranzábal
- (Spain) Joseba Etxeberría
- (Spain) Josep Guardiola
- (Spain) Iván Helguera
- (Spain) Paco
- (Spain) Sergi
- (Sweden) Patrik Andersson
- (Sweden) Johan Mjällby
- (Turkey) Okan Buruk
- (Turkey) Suat Kaya
- (Turkey) Tayfun Korkut
- (Turkey) Ogün Temizkanoğlu
- (Turkey) Hakan Ünsal
- (Federal Republic of Yugoslavia) Ljubinko Drulović
- (Federal Republic of Yugoslavia) Vladimir Jugović
- (Federal Republic of Yugoslavia) Slobodan Komljenović
- (Federal Republic of Yugoslavia) Albert Nađ
- (Federal Republic of Yugoslavia) Niša Saveljić
- (Federal Republic of Yugoslavia) Jovan Stanković
- (Federal Republic of Yugoslavia) Dragan Stojković

=== By referee ===
| Referee | Matches | Red | Yellow | Red Cards |
|---|---|---|---|---|
| (Germany) Markus Merk | 3 | 2 | 19 | 1 straight red 1 second yellow |
| (Portugal) Vítor Melo Pereira | 3 | 2 | 3 | 1 straight red 1 second yellow |
| (Austria) Günter Benkö | 3 | 2 | 9 | 2 straight red |
| (Netherlands) Dick Jol | 3 | 1 | 15 | 1 straight red |
| (Italy) Pierluigi Collina | 3 | 1 | 13 | 1 straight red |
| (Sweden) Anders Frisk | 3 | 0 | 11 | |
| (France) Gilles Veissière | 2 | 1 | 9 | 1 second yellow |
| (Scotland) Hugh Dallas | 2 | 1 | 7 | 1 straight red |
| (Switzerland) Urs Meier | 2 | 0 | 11 | |
| (Egypt) Gamal Al-Ghandour | 2 | 0 | 9 | |
| (England) Graham Poll | 2 | 0 | 7 | |
| (Denmark) Kim Milton Nielsen | 2 | 0 | 5 | |
| (Spain) José García Aranda | 2 | 0 | 4 | |

=== By team ===
| Team | Matches | Red | Yellow | Red Cards | Suspensions |
|---|---|---|---|---|---|
| FR Yugoslavia | 4 | 3 | 11 | S. Mihajlović vs Slovenia; M. Kežman vs Norway; S. Jokanović vs Spain | S. Mihajlović vs Norway; M. Kežman vs Spain; S. Jokanović vs Netherlands |
| Portugal | 6 | 1 | 13 | Nuno Gomes vs France (semi-final) | L. Figo vs Estonia (WCQ); Nuno Gomes vs Estonia (WCQ); J. Pinto vs Estonia (WCQ) |
| Italy | 6 | 1 | 11 | G. Zambrotta vs Netherlands (semi-final) | G. Zambrotta vs Netherlands (semi-final); G. Zambrotta vs France (final) |
| Romania | 4 | 1 | 11 | G. Hagi vs Italy (quarter-final) | A. Ilie vs Italy (quarter-final); D. Petrescu vs Italy (quarter-final); G. Hagi vs Lithuania (WCQ) |
| Czech Republic | 3 | 1 | 9 | R. Látal vs Netherlands | R. Látal vs France; K. Poborský vs Bulgaria (WCQ) |
| Belgium | 3 | 1 | 6 | F. De Wilde vs Turkey | F. De Wilde vs Croatia (WCQ) |
| Turkey | 4 | 1 | 5 | A. Özalan vs Portugal (quarter-final) | A. Özalan vs Moldova (WCQ) |
| Sweden | 3 | 1 | 2 | P. Andersson vs Belgium | P. Andersson vs Turkey |
| Netherlands | 5 | 0 | 13 | | G. Van Bronckhorst vs France; E. Davids vs Republic of Ireland (WCQ) |
| Spain | 4 | 0 | 9 | | M. Salgado vs Bosnia and Herzegovina (WCQ) |
| France | 6 | 0 | 8 | | M. Desailly vs Italy (final); P. Vieira vs Italy (final) |
| Germany | 3 | 0 | 6 | | |
| Slovenia | 3 | 0 | 6 | | D. Milanič vs Norway; M. Pavlin vs Faroe Islands (WCQ) |
| Denmark | 3 | 0 | 5 | | |
| Norway | 4 | 0 | 5 | | E. Mykland vs Armenia (WCQ) |
| England | 4 | 0 | 3 | | |

== Clean sheets ==
- Most clean sheets (team): 3 - Italy, Netherlands, Portugal
- Fewest clean sheets (team): 0 – Belgium, Denmark, Germany, Romania, Spain

== Overall statistics ==
In the following tables:

- **Pld** = total games played
- **W** = total games won
- **D** = total games drawn (tied)
- **L** = total games lost
- **Pts** = total points accumulated (teams receive three points for a win, one point for a draw and no points for a loss)
- **APts** = average points per game
- **GF** = total goals scored (goals for)
- **AGF** = average goals scored per game
- **GA** = total goals conceded (goals against)
- **AGA** = average goals conceded per game
- **GD** = goal difference (GF−GA)
- **CS** = clean sheets
- **ACS** = average clean sheets
- **YC** = yellow cards
- **AYC** = average yellow cards
- **RC** = red cards
- **ARC** = average red cards

BOLD indicates that this nation has the highest
Italics indicates the host nation

| Nation | Pld | W | D | L | Pts | APts | GF | AGF | GA | AGA | GD | CS | ACS | YC | AYC | RC | ARC |
|---|---|---|---|---|---|---|---|---|---|---|---|---|---|---|---|---|---|
| Belgium | 3 | 1 | 0 | 2 | 3 | 1 | 2 | 0.66 | 5 | 1.66 | -3 | 0 | 0 | 6 | 2 | 1 | 0.33 |
| Czech Republic | 3 | 1 | 0 | 2 | 3 | 1 | 3 | 1 | 3 | 1 | 0 | 1 | 0.33 | 9 | **3** | 0 | 0 |
| Denmark | 3 | 0 | 0 | **3** | 0 | 0 | 0 | 0 | 8 | 2.66 | -8 | 0 | 0 | 5 | 1.66 | 0 | 0 |
| England | 3 | 1 | 0 | 2 | 3 | 1 | 5 | 1.66 | 6 | 2 | -1 | 1 | 0.33 | 3 | 1 | 0 | 0 |
| France | **6** | **5** | 0 | 1 | **15** | **2.5** | **13** | 2.16 | 7 | 1.16 | +6 | 1 | 0.16 | 8 | 1.33 | 0 | 0 |
| Germany | 3 | 0 | 1 | 2 | 1 | 0.33 | 1 | 0.33 | 5 | 1.66 | -4 | 0 | 0 | 5 | 1.66 | 0 | 0 |
| Italy | **6** | **4** | 1 | 1 | **13** | **2.17** | 9 | 1.5 | 4 | 0.66 | +5 | **3** | 0.50 | 11 | 1.83 | 1 | 0.16 |
| Netherlands | 5 | 4 | 1 | 0 | 13 | 2.60 | **13** | **2.60** | 3 | 0.60 | **+10** | **3** | 0.60 | **13** | 2.16 | 0 | 0 |
| Norway | 3 | 1 | 1 | 1 | 4 | 1.33 | 1 | 0.33 | 1 | 0.33 | 0 | 2 | **0.66** | 5 | 1.66 | 0 | 0 |
| Portugal | 5 | 4 | 0 | 1 | 12 | 2.4 | 10 | 2 | 4 | 0.8 | +6 | **3** | 0.60 | **13** | 2.60 | 0 | 0 |
| Romania | 4 | 1 | 1 | 2 | 4 | 1 | 4 | 1 | 6 | 1.5 | -2 | 0 | 0 | 11 | 2.74 | 1 | 0.25 |
| Slovenia | 3 | 0 | **2** | 1 | 2 | 0.66 | 4 | 1.33 | 5 | 1.66 | -1 | 1 | 0.33 | 6 | 2 | 0 | 0 |
| Spain | 4 | 2 | 0 | 2 | 6 | 1.50 | 7 | 1.75 | 7 | 1.75 | 0 | 0 | 0 | 9 | 2.25 | 0 | 0 |
| Sweden | 3 | 0 | 1 | 2 | 1 | 0.33 | 2 | 0.66 | 4 | 1.33 | -2 | 1 | 0.33 | 2 | 0.66 | 1 | 0.33 |
| Turkey | 4 | 1 | 1 | 2 | 4 | 1.00 | 3 | 0.75 | 4 | 1 | -1 | 2 | 0.50 | 6 | 1.50 | 1 | 0.25 |
| FR Yugoslavia | 4 | 1 | 1 | 2 | 4 | 1 | 8 | 2 | **13** | **3.25** | -5 | 1 | 0.25 | 10 | 2.50 | **3** | **0.75** |
| **Total** | 31 | 27 | 8 | 27 | 89 | 2.87 | 85 | 2.74 | 85 | 2.74 | 0 | 19 | 0.61 | 122 | 3.93 | 8 | 0.25 |
