= UEFA Euro 2000 knockout stage =

International football tournament stage

The knockout stage of UEFA Euro 2000 started with the first quarter-final on 24 June and ended with the final on 2 July 2000.

All times Central European Summer Time (UTC+2)

== Format ==
Any game in the knockout stage that was undecided by the end of the regular 90 minutes, was followed by up to 30 minutes of extra time (two 15-minute halves). In extra time, the golden goal rule was applied, whereby the match would immediately end upon either team scoring, with the team having scored being declared the winner. If scores were still level after 30 minutes of extra time, there would be a penalty shoot-out to determine who progressed to the next round. As with every tournament since UEFA Euro 1984, there was no third place play-off.

== Qualified teams ==
The top two placed teams from each of the four groups qualified for the knockout stage.

Group	Winners	Runners-up
A	Portugal	Romania
B	Italy	Turkey
C	Spain	FR Yugoslavia
D	Netherlands	France

== Bracket ==
Quarter-finals
25 June – Bruges
Spain	1
France	2
24 June – Amsterdam
Turkey	0
Portugal	2
24 June – Brussels
Italy	2
Romania	0
25 June – Rotterdam
Netherlands	6
FR Yugoslavia	1

Semi-finals
28 June – Brussels
France (g.g.)	2
Portugal	1
29 June – Amsterdam
Italy (p)	0 (3)
Netherlands	0 (1)

Final
2 July – Rotterdam
France (g.g.)	2
Italy	1

== Quarter-finals ==
In the first quarter-final, Portugal defeated Turkey thanks to a brace from striker Nuno Gomes. Italy beat Romania by the same scoreline, with Francesco Totti and Filippo Inzaghi scoring a goal apiece.

The Netherlands thrashed FR Yugoslavia 6–1 in the third match, Patrick Kluivert (3) and Marc Overmars (2) amongst the scorers. In the final game, Spain's European dream came to an end with a 2–1 loss to France: Gaizka Mendieta's penalty goal was sandwiched by goals from Zinedine Zidane and Youri Djorkaeff. Raúl failed to convert a last-minute penalty kick that would have sent the match to extra time.

=== Portugal vs Turkey ===
24 June 2000
18:00

Portugal	2–0	Turkey
Nuno Gomes 44', 56'	Report

Amsterdam Arena, Amsterdam
Attendance: 42,000
Referee: Dick Jol (Netherlands)

Portugal	Turkey

GK	1	Vítor Baía (c)
CB	2	Jorge Costa
CB	5	Fernando Couto	(yellow card) 37'
CB	13	Dimas
CM	15	Costinha	(yellow card) 41'	(substituted off) 46'
CM	17	Paulo Bento
RW	11	Sérgio Conceição
AM	10	Rui Costa	(yellow card) 39'	(substituted off) 87'
LW	7	Luís Figo
CF	8	João Pinto	(yellow card) 29'
CF	21	Nuno Gomes		(substituted off) 75'
Substitutions:
MF	6	Paulo Sousa	(yellow card) 60'	(substituted on) 46'
FW	9	Ricardo Sá Pinto		(substituted on) 75'
MF	19	Capucho		(substituted on) 87'
Manager:
Humberto Coelho

GK	1	Rüştü Reçber
CB	4	Fatih Akyel
CB	3	Ogün Temizkanoğlu (c)	(yellow card) 82'	(substituted off) 84'
CB	5	Alpay Özalan	(red card) 30'
RWB	11	Tayfun Korkut
LWB	16	Ergün Penbe
CM	2	Tayfur Havutçu
CM	7	Okan Buruk	(yellow card) 32'	(substituted off) 62'
CM	20	Hakan Ünsal	(yellow card) 56'
CF	6	Arif Erdem		(substituted off) 62'
CF	9	Hakan Şükür
Substitutions:
DF	14	Suat Kaya		(substituted on) 62'
FW	17	Oktay Derelioğlu		(substituted on) 62'
MF	10	Sergen Yalçın		(substituted on) 84'
Manager:
Mustafa Denizli

Man of the Match:
Luís Figo (Portugal)

Assistant referees:
Jaap Pool (Netherlands)
Roland Van Nylen (Belgium)
Fourth official:
Markus Merk (Germany)

=== Italy vs Romania ===
24 June 2000
20:45

Italy	2–0	Romania
Totti 33'; Inzaghi 43'	Report

King Baudouin Stadium, Brussels
Attendance: 41,000
Referee: Vítor Melo Pereira (Portugal)

Italy	Romania

GK	12	Francesco Toldo
CB	5	Fabio Cannavaro
CB	13	Alessandro Nesta
CB	15	Mark Iuliano
RWB	17	Gianluca Zambrotta
LWB	3	Paolo Maldini (c)		(substituted off) 46'
CM	18	Stefano Fiore
CM	4	Demetrio Albertini	(yellow card) 38'
AM	8	Antonio Conte		(substituted off) 55'
CF	9	Filippo Inzaghi
CF	20	Francesco Totti		(substituted off) 75'
Substitutions:
DF	11	Gianluca Pessotto		(substituted on) 46'
MF	14	Luigi Di Biagio		(substituted on) 55'
FW	10	Alessandro Del Piero		(substituted on) 75'
Manager:
Dino Zoff

GK	12	Bogdan Stelea
RB	4	Iulian Filipescu
CB	17	Miodrag Belodedici
CB	3	Liviu Ciobotariu
LB	13	Cristian Chivu
RM	14	Florentin Petre
CM	5	Constantin Gâlcă		(substituted off) 68'
CM	10	Gheorghe Hagi (c)	(yellow card) 55' (yellow-red card) 59'
LM	8	Dorinel Munteanu
CF	9	Viorel Moldovan		(substituted off) 54'
CF	7	Adrian Mutu
Substitutions:
FW	18	Ionel Ganea		(substituted on) 54'
MF	15	Ioan Lupescu		(substituted on) 68'
Manager:
Emerich Jenei

Man of the Match:
Alessandro Nesta (Italy)

Assistant referees:
Jacques Poudevigne (France)
Igor Šramka (Slovakia)
Fourth official:
Anders Frisk (Sweden)

=== Netherlands vs FR Yugoslavia ===
25 June 2000
18:00

Netherlands	6–1	FR Yugoslavia
Kluivert 24', 38', 54'; Govedarica 51' (o.g.); Overmars 78', 90+1'	Report	Milošević 90+2'

Feijenoord Stadion, Rotterdam
Attendance: 44,000
Referee: José María García-Aranda (Spain)

Netherlands	FR Yugoslavia

GK	1	Edwin van der Sar		(substituted off) 65'
RB	15	Paul Bosvelt	(yellow card) 48'
CB	3	Jaap Stam
CB	4	Frank de Boer (c)
LB	19	Arthur Numan
RM	11	Marc Overmars
CM	7	Philip Cocu
CM	8	Edgar Davids
LM	5	Boudewijn Zenden		(substituted off) 86'
CF	9	Patrick Kluivert		(substituted off) 60'
CF	10	Dennis Bergkamp
Substitutions:
FW	21	Roy Makaay		(substituted on) 60'
GK	22	Sander Westerveld		(substituted on) 65'
MF	16	Ronald de Boer		(substituted on) 86'
Manager:
Frank Rijkaard

GK	22	Ivica Kralj
RB	13	Slobodan Komljenović
CB	5	Miroslav Đukić
CB	11	Siniša Mihajlović
LB	14	Niša Saveljić	(substituted off) 56'
RM	10	Dragan Stojković (c)	(substituted off) 52'
CM	16	Dejan Govedarica
CM	7	Vladimir Jugović
LM	17	Ljubinko Drulović	(substituted off) 70'
CF	8	Predrag Mijatović
CF	9	Savo Milošević
Substitutions:
MF	6	Dejan Stanković	(substituted on) 52'
MF	19	Jovan Stanković	(substituted on) 56'
FW	18	Darko Kovačević	(substituted on) 70'
Manager:
Vujadin Boškov

Man of the Match:
Patrick Kluivert (Netherlands)

Assistant referees:
Carlos Martín Nieto (Spain)
Jens Larsen (Denmark)
Fourth official:
Günter Benkö (Austria)

=== Spain vs France ===
25 June 2000
20:45

Spain	1–2	France
Mendieta 38' (pen.)	Report	Zidane 32'; Djorkaeff 44'

Jan Breydel Stadium, Bruges
Attendance: 26,614
Referee: Pierluigi Collina (Italy)

Spain	France

GK	1	Santiago Cañizares
RB	2	Míchel Salgado	(yellow card) 64'
CB	5	Abelardo (c)
CB	18	Paco	(yellow card) 71'
LB	3	Agustín Aranzábal
RM	16	Gaizka Mendieta		(substituted off) 57'
CM	4	Pep Guardiola	(yellow card) 61'
CM	7	Iván Helguera		(substituted off) 77'
LM	9	Pedro Munitis		(substituted off) 73'
CF	11	Alfonso	(yellow card) 55'
CF	10	Raúl
Substitutions:
FW	20	Ismael Urzaiz		(substituted on) 57'
FW	17	Joseba Etxeberria		(substituted on) 73'
MF	14	Gerard		(substituted on) 77'
Manager:
José Antonio Camacho

GK	16	Fabien Barthez
RB	15	Lilian Thuram
CB	8	Marcel Desailly
CB	5	Laurent Blanc
LB	3	Bixente Lizarazu
CM	4	Patrick Vieira
CM	7	Didier Deschamps (c)	(yellow card) 60'
RW	6	Youri Djorkaeff
AM	10	Zinedine Zidane
LW	12	Thierry Henry		(substituted off) 81'
CF	21	Christophe Dugarry
Substitutions:
FW	9	Nicolas Anelka		(substituted on) 81'
Manager:
Roger Lemerre

Man of the Match:
Zinedine Zidane (France)

Assistant referees:
Nicolae Grigorescu (Romania)
Philip Sharp (England)
Fourth official:
Hugh Dallas (Scotland)

== Semi-finals ==
France and Italy both emerged victorious from their semi-finals against difficult opposition to reach the final. France beat Portugal 2–1 after extra-time; Nuno Gomes gave Portugal the lead in the 19th minute, which they held until just after half-time, when Thierry Henry equalised. The game went to extra-time and looked to be heading for a penalty shootout until Zidane struck the golden goal in the 117th minute.

Italy drew 0–0 in normal time with the Netherlands and it remained the same through extra-time. The game went to penalties and Italy won the penalty shoot-out 3–1. The Netherlands had a particularly dismal showing from the penalty spot this game, with Frank de Boer having a penalty saved and Kluivert hitting the post during normal time, in addition to the failure of the Dutch to convert three out of their four penalties taken during the shoot-out. Perhaps most infamous was Jaap Stam's attempt during the shoot-out (which ballooned well over the crossbar), described by the BBC as "one of the worst spot kicks ever".

=== France vs Portugal ===
28 June 2000
20:45

France	2–1 (a.e.t./g.g.)	Portugal
Henry 51'; Zidane 117' (pen.)	Report	Nuno Gomes 19'

King Baudouin Stadium, Brussels
Attendance: 48,000
Referee: Günter Benkö (Austria)

France	Portugal

GK	16	Fabien Barthez
RB	15	Lilian Thuram
CB	8	Marcel Desailly	(yellow card) 39'
CB	5	Laurent Blanc
LB	3	Bixente Lizarazu
CM	4	Patrick Vieira	(yellow card) 23'
CM	7	Didier Deschamps (c)
CM	17	Emmanuel Petit		(substituted off) 87'
AM	10	Zinedine Zidane
CF	9	Nicolas Anelka		(substituted off) 72'
CF	12	Thierry Henry		(substituted off) 105'
Substitutions:
FW	13	Sylvain Wiltord		(substituted on) 72'
MF	11	Robert Pires		(substituted on) 87'
FW	20	David Trezeguet		(substituted on) 105'
Manager:
Roger Lemerre

GK	1	Vítor Baía (c)
RB	14	Abel Xavier
CB	5	Fernando Couto
CB	2	Jorge Costa	(yellow card) 55'
LB	13	Dimas	(yellow card) 62'	(substituted off) 91'
CM	15	Costinha
CM	4	José Luís Vidigal	(yellow card) 44'	(substituted off) 61'
RW	11	Sérgio Conceição
AM	10	Rui Costa		(substituted off) 78'
LW	7	Luís Figo	(yellow card) 54'
CF	21	Nuno Gomes	(red card) 117'
Substitutions:
MF	17	Paulo Bento		(substituted on) 61'
FW	8	João Pinto	(yellow card) 107'	(substituted on) 78'
DF	3	Rui Jorge		(substituted on) 91'
Manager:
Humberto Coelho

Man of the Match:
Zinedine Zidane (France)

Assistant referees:
Igor Šramka (Slovakia)
Roland Van Nylen (Belgium)
Fourth official:
Hugh Dallas (Scotland)

=== Italy vs Netherlands ===
29 June 2000
18:00

Italy	0–0 (a.e.t.)	Netherlands
	Report
Penalties
Di Biagio (penalty scored); Pessotto (penalty scored); Totti (penalty scored); Maldini (penalty missed)	3–1	(penalty missed) F. de Boer; (penalty missed) Stam; (penalty scored) Kluivert; (penalty missed) Bosvelt

Amsterdam Arena, Amsterdam
Attendance: 50,000
Referee: Markus Merk (Germany)

Italy	Netherlands

GK	12	Francesco Toldo	(yellow card) 38'
RB	17	Gianluca Zambrotta	(yellow card) 15' (yellow-red card) 34'
CB	5	Fabio Cannavaro
CB	13	Alessandro Nesta
CB	15	Mark Iuliano	(yellow card) 16'
LB	3	Paolo Maldini (c)	(yellow card) 45'
RM	14	Luigi Di Biagio	(yellow card) 87'
CM	4	Demetrio Albertini		(substituted off) 77'
LM	18	Stefano Fiore		(substituted off) 83'
CF	10	Alessandro Del Piero
CF	9	Filippo Inzaghi		(substituted off) 67'
Substitutions:
FW	21	Marco Delvecchio		(substituted on) 67'
DF	11	Gianluca Pessotto		(substituted on) 77'
MF	20	Francesco Totti		(substituted on) 83'
Manager:
Dino Zoff

GK	1	Edwin van der Sar
RB	15	Paul Bosvelt
CB	3	Jaap Stam	(yellow card) 93'
CB	4	Frank de Boer (c)
LB	12	Giovanni van Bronckhorst	(yellow card) 75'
RM	11	Marc Overmars
CM	7	Philip Cocu		(substituted off) 95'
CM	8	Edgar Davids	(yellow card) 50'
LM	5	Boudewijn Zenden	(yellow card) 28'	(substituted off) 77'
CF	9	Patrick Kluivert
CF	10	Dennis Bergkamp		(substituted off) 86'
Substitutions:
FW	14	Peter van Vossen		(substituted on) 77'
MF	6	Clarence Seedorf		(substituted on) 86'
MF	20	Aron Winter		(substituted on) 95'
Manager:
Frank Rijkaard

Man of the Match:
Francesco Toldo (Italy)

Assistant referees:
Kurt Ertl (Germany)
Philip Sharp (England)
Fourth official:
José María García-Aranda (Spain)

== Final ==
2 July 2000
20:00

France	2–1 (a.e.t./g.g.)	Italy
Wiltord 90+4'; Trezeguet 103'	Report	Delvecchio 55'

De Kuip, Rotterdam
Attendance: 48,100
Referee: Anders Frisk (Sweden)

France	Italy

GK	16	Fabien Barthez
RB	15	Lilian Thuram	(yellow card) 58'
CB	8	Marcel Desailly
CB	5	Laurent Blanc
LB	3	Bixente Lizarazu		(substituted off) 86'
CM	4	Patrick Vieira
CM	7	Didier Deschamps (c)
RW	6	Youri Djorkaeff		(substituted off) 76'
AM	10	Zinedine Zidane
LW	12	Thierry Henry
CF	21	Christophe Dugarry		(substituted off) 58'
Substitutions:
FW	13	Sylvain Wiltord		(substituted on) 58'
FW	20	David Trezeguet		(substituted on) 76'
MF	11	Robert Pires		(substituted on) 86'
Manager:
Roger Lemerre

GK	12	Francesco Toldo
CB	5	Fabio Cannavaro	(yellow card) 42'
CB	13	Alessandro Nesta
CB	15	Mark Iuliano
RWB	11	Gianluca Pessotto
LWB	3	Paolo Maldini (c)
CM	4	Demetrio Albertini
CM	14	Luigi Di Biagio	(yellow card) 31'	(substituted off) 66'
AM	18	Stefano Fiore		(substituted off) 53'
SS	20	Francesco Totti	(yellow card) 90'
CF	21	Marco Delvecchio		(substituted off) 86'
Substitutions:
FW	10	Alessandro Del Piero		(substituted on) 53'
MF	16	Massimo Ambrosini		(substituted on) 66'
FW	19	Vincenzo Montella		(substituted on) 86'
Manager:
Dino Zoff

Man of the Match:
Thierry Henry (France) (Note: While some UEFA sources credit Italy's Francesco Totti as the man of the match for the final, UEFA's Technical Study Group named Thierry Henry as the award winner.)

Assistant referees:
Leif Lindberg (Sweden)
Jens Larsen (Denmark)
Fourth official:
José María García-Aranda (Spain)
