= Moldovan Orthodox Church (disambiguation) =

The Moldovan Orthodox Church is the Metropolis of Chișinău and All Moldova, established in 1944 in the Republic of Moldova.

Moldovan Orthodox Church may also refer to:

- Metropolis of Moldavia and Bukovina (established in 1386), a metropolis of the Romanian Orthodox Church in Iași, Romania
- Metropolis of Bessarabia (established in 1918), a self-governing church body in the Republic of Moldova, under the Romanian Orthodox Church

== See also ==
- Moldovan (disambiguation)
- Moldavians (disambiguation)
