= Mordova =

Mordova may refer (as misspelling) to:

- Mordovia, a republic of Russia
- Moldova, the Republic of Moldova, a country in Eastern Europe

== See also ==
- Moldova (disambiguation)
