= UEFA Euro 2000 Group A =

International football tournament group

Group A of UEFA Euro 2000 began on 12 June and ended on 20 June 2000. Portugal won the group ahead of Romania, while England and Germany were surprisingly eliminated.

== Teams ==
Draw position	Team	Pot	Method of qualification	Date of qualification	Finals appearance	Last appearance	Previous best performance	UEFA Rankings November 1999 (Note: The UEFA rankings of November 1999 were used for seeding for the final draw.)	FIFA Rankings June 2000
A1	Germany (Note: From 1972 to 1988, Germany competed as West Germany.)	1	Group 3 winner	9 October 1999	8th	1996	Winners (1972, 1980, 1996)	7	6
A2	Romania	2	Group 7 winner	9 October 1999	3rd	1996	Group stage (1984, 1996)	2	11
A3	Portugal	3	Best runner-up	9 October 1999	3rd	1996	Semi-finals (1984)	11	15
A4	England	4	Play-off winner	17 November 1999	6th	1996	Third place (1968), Semi-finals (1996)	17	12

== Standings ==
Pos	Team	Pld	W	D	L	GF	GA	GD	Pts	Qualification
1	Portugal	3	3	0	0	7	2	+5	9	Advance to knockout stage
2	Romania	3	1	1	1	4	4	0	4	Advance to knockout stage
3	England	3	1	0	2	5	6	−1	3	
4	Germany	3	0	1	2	1	5	−4	1	

Source: UEFA
Rules for classification: Group stage tiebreakers

In the quarter-finals,

- The winner of Group A, Portugal, advanced to play the runner-up of Group B, Turkey.
- The runner-up of Group A, Romania, advanced to play the winner of Group B, Italy.

== Matches ==
=== Germany vs Romania ===
12 June 2000
18:00

Germany	1–1	Romania
Scholl 28'	Report	Moldovan 5'

Stade Maurice Dufrasne, Liège
Attendance: 28,500
Referee: Kim Milton Nielsen (Denmark)

Germany	Romania

GK	1	Oliver Kahn
SW	10	Lothar Matthäus	(substituted off) 78'
CB	4	Thomas Linke	(substituted off) 46'
CB	6	Jens Nowotny
RWB	2	Markus Babbel
LWB	17	Christian Ziege
DM	16	Jens Jeremies
AM	7	Mehmet Scholl
AM	8	Thomas Häßler	(substituted off) 73'
CF	20	Oliver Bierhoff (c)
CF	11	Paulo Rink
Substitutions:
DF	3	Marko Rehmer	(substituted on) 46'
MF	14	Dietmar Hamann	(substituted on) 73'
MF	18	Sebastian Deisler	(substituted on) 78'
Manager:
Erich Ribbeck

GK	12	Bogdan Stelea
SW	6	Gheorghe Popescu
RB	2	Dan Petrescu		(substituted off) 69'
CB	3	Liviu Ciobotariu
CB	4	Iulian Filipescu
LB	13	Cristian Chivu
CM	8	Dorinel Munteanu
CM	5	Constantin Gâlcă
AM	10	Gheorghe Hagi (c)	(yellow card) 49'	(substituted off) 73'
CF	9	Viorel Moldovan		(substituted off) 85'
CF	11	Adrian Ilie	(yellow card) 49'
Substitutions:
DF	22	Cosmin Contra		(substituted on) 69'
FW	7	Adrian Mutu		(substituted on) 73'
MF	15	Ioan Lupescu		(substituted on) 85'
Manager:
Emerich Jenei

Man of the Match:
Mehmet Scholl (Germany)

Assistant referees:
Jens Larsen (Denmark)
Roland Van Nylen (Belgium)
Fourth official:
Gilles Veissière (France)

=== Portugal vs England ===
12 June 2000
20:45

Portugal	3–2	England
Figo 22'; João Pinto 37'; Nuno Gomes 59'	Report	Scholes 3'; McManaman 18'

Philips Stadion, Eindhoven
Attendance: 31,500
Referee: Anders Frisk (Sweden)

Portugal	England

GK	1	Vítor Baía (c)	(yellow card) 89'
RB	14	Abel Xavier
CB	2	Jorge Costa
CB	5	Fernando Couto
LB	13	Dimas Teixeira
CM	17	Paulo Bento
CM	4	José Luís Vidigal
AM	10	Rui Costa		(substituted off) 85'
RF	7	Luís Figo
CF	21	Nuno Gomes		(substituted off) 89'
LF	8	João Pinto		(substituted off) 75'
Substitutions:
MF	11	Sérgio Conceição		(substituted on) 75'
DF	16	Beto		(substituted on) 85'
MF	19	Capucho		(substituted on) 89'
Manager:
Humberto Coelho

GK	1	David Seaman
RB	2	Gary Neville
CB	5	Tony Adams		(substituted off) 82'
CB	4	Sol Campbell
LB	3	Phil Neville
RM	7	David Beckham
CM	8	Paul Scholes
CM	14	Paul Ince	(yellow card) 44'
LM	11	Steve McManaman		(substituted off) 58'
CF	9	Alan Shearer (c)
CF	10	Michael Owen		(substituted off) 46'
Substitutions:
FW	19	Emile Heskey		(substituted on) 46'
MF	17	Dennis Wise		(substituted on) 58'
DF	6	Martin Keown		(substituted on) 82'
Manager:
Kevin Keegan

Man of the Match:
Luís Figo (Portugal)

Assistant referees:
Leif Lindberg (Sweden)
Emanuel Zammit (Malta)
Fourth official:
Urs Meier (Switzerland)

=== Romania vs Portugal ===
17 June 2000
18:00

Romania	0–1	Portugal
	Report	Costinha 90+4'

GelreDome, Arnhem
Attendance: 28,400
Referee: Gilles Veissière (France)

Romania	Portugal

GK	12	Bogdan Stelea
RB	22	Cosmin Contra	(yellow card) 27'
CB	4	Iulian Filipescu
CB	6	Gheorghe Popescu
LB	13	Cristian Chivu
DM	5	Constantin Gâlcă
RM	2	Dan Petrescu	(yellow card) 22'	(substituted off) 64'
LM	8	Dorinel Munteanu
AM	10	Gheorghe Hagi (c)	(yellow card) 16'
CF	9	Viorel Moldovan		(substituted off) 69'
CF	11	Adrian Ilie		(substituted off) 78'
Substitutions:
MF	14	Florentin Petre		(substituted on) 64'
FW	18	Ionel Ganea		(substituted on) 69'
FW	16	Laurenţiu Roşu		(substituted on) 78'
Manager:
Emerich Jenei

GK	1	Vítor Baía (c)
RB	20	Carlos Secretário
CB	2	Jorge Costa
CB	5	Fernando Couto
LB	13	Dimas Teixeira
CM	17	Paulo Bento
CM	4	José Luís Vidigal
AM	10	Rui Costa		(substituted off) 87'
RF	7	Luís Figo	(yellow card) 30'
CF	21	Nuno Gomes		(substituted off) 56'
LF	8	João Pinto		(substituted off) 56'
Substitutions:
FW	9	Ricardo Sá Pinto		(substituted on) 56'
MF	11	Sérgio Conceição		(substituted on) 56'
MF	15	Costinha		(substituted on) 87'
Manager:
Humberto Coelho

Man of the Match:
Fernando Couto (Portugal)

Assistant referees:
Jacques Poudevigne (France)
Dramane Dante (Mali)
Fourth official:
Michel Piraux (Belgium)

=== England vs Germany ===
17 June 2000
20:45

England	1–0	Germany
Shearer 53'	Report

Stade du Pays de Charleroi, Charleroi
Attendance: 29,000
Referee: Pierluigi Collina (Italy)

England	Germany

GK	1	David Seaman
RB	2	Gary Neville
CB	4	Sol Campbell
CB	6	Martin Keown
LB	3	Phil Neville
RM	7	David Beckham	(yellow card) 41'
CM	8	Paul Scholes		(substituted off) 71'
CM	14	Paul Ince
LM	17	Dennis Wise
CF	9	Alan Shearer (c)
CF	10	Michael Owen		(substituted off) 61'
Substitutions:
MF	16	Steven Gerrard		(substituted on) 61'
MF	18	Nick Barmby		(substituted on) 71'
Manager:
Kevin Keegan

GK	1	Oliver Kahn (c)
SW	10	Lothar Matthäus
CB	2	Markus Babbel	(yellow card) 89'
CB	6	Jens Nowotny
RWB	18	Sebastian Deisler		(substituted off) 72'
LWB	17	Christian Ziege
CM	14	Dietmar Hamann
CM	16	Jens Jeremies	(yellow card) 43'	(substituted off) 78'
AM	7	Mehmet Scholl
CF	19	Carsten Jancker
CF	9	Ulf Kirsten		(substituted off) 70'
Substitutions:
FW	11	Paulo Rink		(substituted on) 70'
MF	13	Michael Ballack		(substituted on) 72'
MF	5	Marco Bode		(substituted on) 78'
Manager:
Erich Ribbeck

Man of the Match:
Alan Shearer (England)

Assistant referees:
Sergio Zuccolini (Italy)
Carlos Martín Nieto (Spain)
Fourth official:
Gamal Al-Ghandour (Egypt)

=== England vs Romania ===
20 June 2000
20:45

England	2–3	Romania
Shearer 41' (pen.); Owen 45'	Report	Chivu 22'; Munteanu 48'; Ganea 89' (pen.)

Stade du Pays de Charleroi, Charleroi
Attendance: 30,000
Referee: Urs Meier (Switzerland)

England	Romania

GK	13	Nigel Martyn
RB	2	Gary Neville
CB	4	Sol Campbell
CB	6	Martin Keown
LB	3	Phil Neville
RM	7	David Beckham
CM	8	Paul Scholes		(substituted off) 81'
CM	14	Paul Ince
LM	17	Dennis Wise		(substituted off) 75'
CF	9	Alan Shearer (c)	(yellow card) 64'
CF	10	Michael Owen		(substituted off) 66'
Substitutions:
FW	19	Emile Heskey		(substituted on) 66'
MF	18	Nick Barmby		(substituted on) 75'
MF	12	Gareth Southgate		(substituted on) 81'
Manager:
Kevin Keegan

GK	12	Bogdan Stelea
RB	22	Cosmin Contra	(yellow card) 44'
CB	4	Iulian Filipescu	(yellow card) 71'
CB	6	Gheorghe Popescu (c)		(substituted off) 32'
LB	13	Cristian Chivu	(yellow card) 18'
RM	2	Dan Petrescu	(yellow card) 40'
CM	5	Constantin Gâlcă		(substituted off) 68'
CM	8	Dorinel Munteanu
LM	11	Adrian Ilie	(yellow card) 45'	(substituted off) 74'
CF	9	Viorel Moldovan
CF	7	Adrian Mutu
Substitutions:
DF	17	Miodrag Belodedici		(substituted on) 32'
FW	16	Laurenţiu Roşu		(substituted on) 68'
FW	18	Ionel Ganea		(substituted on) 74'
Manager:
Emerich Jenei

Man of the Match:
Dorinel Munteanu (Romania)

Assistant referees:
Igor Šramka (Slovakia)
Yuri Dupanov (Belarus)
Fourth official:
Terje Hauge (Norway)

=== Portugal vs Germany ===
20 June 2000
20:45

Portugal	3–0	Germany
Conceição 35', 54', 71'	Report

Feijenoord Stadion, Rotterdam
Attendance: 44,000
Referee: Dick Jol (Netherlands)

Portugal	Germany

GK	12	Pedro Espinha		(substituted off) 90'
RB	16	Beto	(yellow card) 27'
CB	2	Jorge Costa
CB	5	Fernando Couto (c)
LB	3	Rui Jorge
RM	11	Sérgio Conceição
CM	6	Paulo Sousa		(substituted off) 72'
CM	15	Costinha
LM	19	Capucho
CF	9	Ricardo Sá Pinto
CF	18	Pauleta		(substituted off) 67'
Substitutions:
FW	21	Nuno Gomes		(substituted on) 67'
MF	4	José Luís Vidigal		(substituted on) 72'
GK	22	Quim		(substituted on) 90'
Manager:
Humberto Coelho

GK	1	Oliver Kahn (c)
SW	10	Lothar Matthäus
RB	3	Marko Rehmer
CB	4	Thomas Linke
LB	6	Jens Nowotny
CM	13	Michael Ballack	(yellow card) 25'	(substituted off) 46'
CM	14	Dietmar Hamann
RW	18	Sebastian Deisler	(yellow card) 27'
AM	7	Mehmet Scholl		(substituted off) 60'
LW	5	Marco Bode
CF	19	Carsten Jancker	(yellow card) 26'	(substituted off) 69'
Substitutions:
FW	11	Paulo Rink	(yellow card) 90'	(substituted on) 46'
MF	8	Thomas Häßler		(substituted on) 60'
FW	9	Ulf Kirsten		(substituted on) 69'
Manager:
Erich Ribbeck

Man of the Match:
Sérgio Conceição (Portugal)

Assistant referees:
Jaap Pool (Netherlands)
Roland Van Nylen (Belgium)
Fourth official:
Ľuboš Micheľ (Slovakia)

== See also ==
- England at the UEFA European Championship
- Germany at the UEFA European Championship
- Portugal at the UEFA European Championship
- Romania at the UEFA European Championship
