= Moldova (disambiguation) =

Moldova, officially the Republic of Moldova, is a country in southeastern Europe.

Moldova or Moldavia may also refer to:

== Places ==
=== Historical ===
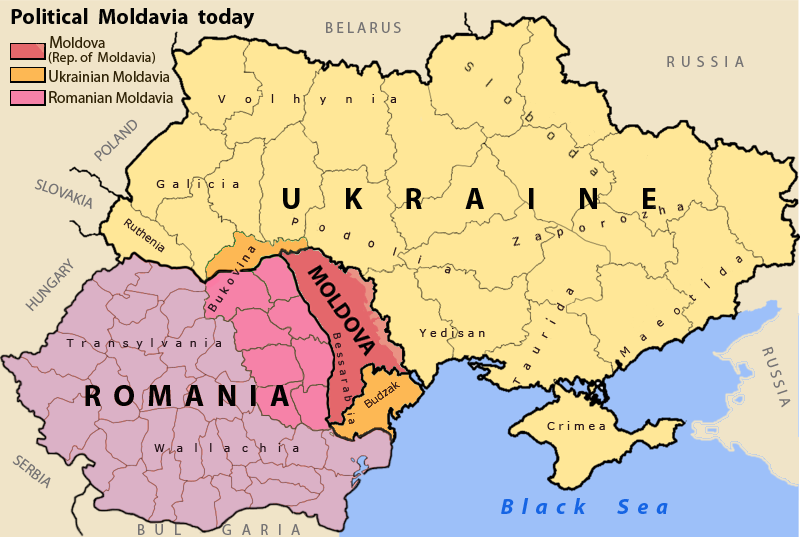
The Principality of Moldavia: red, pink, orange; The Moldavia nowadays: Moldova (red), Romania (pink), and Ukraine (orange).

- Moldavia, a geographic and historical region, and former principality in Eastern Europe (1346–1859)
- Moldavia (region of Romania), one of the four historical regions in contemporary Romania
- Moldavian Democratic Republic, a short-lived state (1917–1918)
- Moldavian ASSR, an autonomous Soviet republic within Ukrainian SSR (1924–1940)
- Moldavian SSR, a republic of the Soviet Union (1940–1941 / 1944–1991)

=== Other places ===
- Moldova Nouă, a town in Caraș-Severin County, Romania
- Moldova, Estonia, a village in Lüganuse Parish, Ida-Viru County, Estonia
- Moldova (river), a river in Romania, in the historical region of Moldavia

== Ships ==
- RMS Moldavia, British steam ship, as HMS Moldavia sunk during World War I
- MV Anne Scan, a Slovenian-built cargo ship also known as Moldavia

== Other uses ==
- Moldova (newspaper), a Romanian newspaper in the 1930s
- Editura Moldova, a Moldovan publishing house; See List of Romanian-language publishers
- György Moldova (1934–2022), Hungarian writer
- 2419 Moldavia, an asteroid discovered in 1974
- TVR Moldova, a Romanian television channel aimed at Moldova

== See also ==
- Moldavians (disambiguation)
- Moldovan (disambiguation)
- Moldava (disambiguation)
- Moldau (disambiguation)
- Eastern Moldova (disambiguation)
