= Eastern Moldova =

Eastern Moldova may refer to:

- Transnistria, a breakaway state
- Moldavia, a historical region
- Bessarabia, a historical region

== See also ==
- Moldova (disambiguation)
