= Moldava =

Moldava may refer to:

- Moldava (Teplice District), a municipality and village in the Czech Republic
- Moldava nad Bodvou, a town in Slovakia

== See also ==
- Moldova, a country in Europe
- Moldavia, a historical region in Europe
- Moldova (disambiguation)
- Moldau (disambiguation)
