= Moldovan (surname) =

Moldovan or Moldovanu is a common surname in Romania and Moldova. It may refer to any of the following:

== People named Moldovan ==
- Leonte Moldovan (1865–1943), Romanian politician
- Marcela Moldovan-Zsak (born 1956), Romanian fencer
- Oleg Moldovan (born 1966), Moldovan sports shooter and Olympic medalist
- Ovidiu Iuliu Moldovan (1942–2008), Romanian actor
- Sacha Moldovan (1901–1982), American painter
- Tibor Moldovan (born 1982), Romanian football player
- Valeriu Moldovan (1875–1954), Romanian politician
- Vasile Moldovan (1911–1990), Olympic gymnast
- Viorel Moldovan (born 1972), Romanian football player

== People named Moldovanu ==
- Benny Moldovanu (born 1962), German economist
- Corneliu Moldovanu (1883–1952), Romanian poet
- Mihai Moldovanu (born 1965), Moldovan politician

== See also ==
- Moldoveanu (surname)
