= Moldau =

Moldau is a German name for:

- German name for the Vltava river, Czech Republic
- German name for Moldava (Teplice District), municipality and village in the Czech Republic
- German title for "Vltava", symphonic poem by Bedřich Smetana
- Herbert Moldau, pen name of Ludwig Winder (1889–1946), Austrian-Czech German-language writer, journalist and literary critic
- Moldau-Stipendium, literary and art prize of the Hessian Ministry for Science and the Arts (1998–2010)

== See also ==
- Moldavia (disambiguation)
- Moldava (disambiguation)
