= Moldoveanu (surname) =

Moldoveanu is a Romanian-language surname that may refer to:

- Alin Moldoveanu (born 1983), Romanian 10 m Air Rifle sport shooter
- Ioachim Moldoveanu (1913–1981), Romanian footballer
- Vasile Moldoveanu (born 1935), Romanian tenor
- Vlad Moldoveanu (born 1988), Romanian basketball player

== See also ==
- Moldovan (surname)
