= Pedro Espinha =

Portuguese football coach and former player

Personal information
- Full name: Pedro Manuel Espinha Ferreira
- Date of birth: 25 September 1965 (age 61)
- Place of birth: Mafra, Portugal
- Height: 1.78 m (5 ft 10 in)
- Position: Goalkeeper

Youth career
- Benfica Corvense
- 1982–1984: Belenenses

Senior career*
Years	Team	Apps	(Gls)
1984–1985	Cova Piedade	20	(0)
1985–1986	Torreense	29	(0)
1986–1987	Académica	1	(0)
1987–1989	Sacavenense	64	(0)
1989–1994	Belenenses	85	(0)
1994–1997	Salgueiros	82	(0)
1997–2000	Vitória Guimarães	97	(0)
2000–2002	Porto	1	(0)
2002	Porto B	1	(0)
2002–2003	Vitória Setúbal	17	(0)
Total		397	(0)

International career
1998–2000	Portugal	6	(0)
Medal record
Men's football
Representing Portugal
UEFA European Championship
Bronze medal – third place	2000 Belgium-Netherlands
- * Club domestic league appearances and goals

Pedro Manuel Ferreira Espinha (born 25 September 1965) is a Portuguese former professional footballer who played as a goalkeeper.

== Club career ==
Espinha was born in Mafra, Lisbon District. During his career, he played for C.D. Cova da Piedade, S.C.U. Torreense, Académica de Coimbra, SG Sacavenense, C.F. Os Belenenses, S.C. Salgueiros, Vitória de Guimarães, FC Porto– arriving at the Primeira Liga club aged 35 and backing up legendary Vítor Baía during his two-year spell– and Vitória de Setúbal.

Espinha retired in June 2003, with 249 Portuguese top-flight games to his credit.

== International career ==
Espinha earned six caps for Portugal, including one at UEFA Euro 2000 against Germany in the group stage, keeping a clean sheet in the 3–0 win as the nation was already qualified and rested practically all its starting XI. From 2007 onwards, he worked as a goalkeeper coach with several youth categories of the national team.

== Honours ==
Porto

- Taça de Portugal: 2000–01
- Supertaça Cândido de Oliveira: 2001
