= Ljubinko Drulović =

Serbian footballer (born 1968)

Personal information
- Date of birth: 11 September 1968 (age 58)
- Place of birth: Nova Varoš, SFR Yugoslavia
- Height: 1.70 m (5 ft 7 in)
- Position: Winger

Youth career
- Zlatar Nova Varoš
- Sloga Užička Požega

Senior career*
Years	Team	Apps	(Gls)
1988–1989	Sloboda Titovo Užice	55	(9)
1990–1992	Rad	77	(25)
1992–1993	Gil Vicente	44	(17)
1994–2001	Porto	225	(40)
2001–2003	Benfica	50	(5)
2003–2004	Partizan	26	(5)
2004–2005	Penafiel	8	(0)
Total		485	(101)

International career
1996–2001	FR Yugoslavia	38	(3)

Managerial career
- 2006: Tourizense
- 2008: Banat Zrenjanin
- 2008–2009: Drava Ptuj
- 2010–2011: 1º Agosto
- 2012–2013: Serbia U19
- 2014: Serbia (caretaker)
- 2015: Macedonia
- 2015: Partizan
- 2019–2020: Uzbekistan U23
- 2021–2023: Serbia (assistant)
- 2023–2024: Serbia U21
- * Club domestic league appearances and goals

Ljubinko Drulović (Serbian Cyrillic: Љубинко Друловић; born 11 September 1968) is a Serbian former professional footballer who played as a winger, and is a current manager.

He spent the most notable part of his playing career in Portugal, with stints at Porto and Benfica – a combined ten seasons between the two clubs, winning 14 major titles with the former. He also had brief spells at Partizan as player and manager.

Drulović represented the Yugoslavia national team in one World Cup and one European Championship, earning 38 caps (including 1 unofficial). He had brief spells as manager of his country and North Macedonia, as well as coaching Serbia under-19 to the European title in 2013.

== Club career ==
Drulović was born in Nova Varoš, Serbia, Socialist Federal Republic of Yugoslavia. After playing out his contract at FK Rad in the summer of 1992, he signed a two-year deal with Portuguese club Gil Vicente FC, but only remained there until December 1993, after which he moved to FC Porto also of the Primeira Liga; between both teams, he finished the 1993–94 season with a career-best 18 goals.

Drulović was one of very few players to have contributed to each of Porto's five consecutive titles during the 90s. He was mostly remembered at the side for his pin-point assists and ability to cross the ball, mainly to the head of Mário Jardel.

In June 2001, already 33, Drulović joined S.L. Benfica. In June 2002, he obtained Portuguese nationality by naturalisation. After a slow 2002–03 campaign, he returned home and signed with FK Partizan, being one of the side's most influential players as they reached the group stage in the UEFA Champions League. He moved back to Portugal a year later, finishing his career with F.C. Penafiel alongside former Porto teammate António Folha.

== International career ==
Drulović made his debut for FR Yugoslavia on 28 December 1996, in a friendly with Argentina played in Mar del Plata (3–2). He went on to play a further 37 times in the following five years, appearing for the nation at the 1998 FIFA World Cup and UEFA Euro 2000 tournaments and contributing with one goal in the 3–3 group stage draw against Slovenia and four assists in the latter as the country reached the quarter-finals.

== Coaching career ==
Drulović began his coaching career with modest Portuguese club G.D. Tourizense, in 2006–07. At the season's closure, he obtained a professional licence.

In early April 2008, Drulović became manager of FK Banat Zrenjanin in the Serbian SuperLiga. As the fifth manager of the season – he replaced Žarko Soldo – he took over a team under relegation threat (eighth place out of 12), with eleven matches to go. Eventually, he could not help prevent them from dropping down a level after a 4–1 loss to FK Vojvodina on 17 May.

In June 2008, Drulović moved to Slovenia and signed with NK Drava Ptuj. Eighteen months later, he was appointed coach of C.D. Primeiro de Agosto of the Angolan Girabola.

As manager of his country's under-19 team, Drulović won the 2013 UEFA European Championship in Lithuania with a shock 1–0 win over France in the final. The following February, he became the senior team's interim manager after Siniša Mihajlović failed to make the year's World Cup. He led the team for four exhibition games before the appointment of Dick Advocaat, starting with a 2–1 win away to the Republic of Ireland on 5 March.

Drulović was named in charge of neighbours Macedonia on 23 April 2015. In five games before leaving for Partizan in October, he avoided defeat in only his last – a goalless draw away to Belarus in UEFA Euro 2016 qualification. His spell back at the reigning Serbian champions lasted only until 22 December, when he was dismissed from the fourth-placed team who were 26 points behind rivals Red Star Belgrade.

== Career statistics ==
Appearances and goals by national team and year
National team	Year	Apps	Goals
FR Yugoslavia	1996	1	1
FR Yugoslavia	1997	11	0
FR Yugoslavia	1998	6	0
FR Yugoslavia	1999	6	1
FR Yugoslavia	2000	9	1
FR Yugoslavia	2001	5	0
Total		38	3

== Honours ==
=== Player ===
Porto

- Primeira Liga: 1994–95, 1995–96, 1996–97, 1997–98, 1998–99
- Taça de Portugal: 1993–94, 1997–98, 1999–2000, 2000–01
- Supertaça Cândido de Oliveira: 1993, 1994, 1996, 1998, 2001

Individual

- UEFA Euro 2000: Top assist provider

=== Manager ===
1º de Agosto

- Supertaça de Angola: 2010

Serbia U19

- UEFA European Under-19 Championship: 2013

Individual

- Serbian Coach of the Year: 2013

== Managerial statistics ==
As of 9 September 2019

Team	Nat	From	To	Record				
Team	Nat	From	To	G	W	D	L	Win %
Macedonia	(North Macedonia)	April 2015	October 2015	5	0	1	4	0.00
Partizan	(Serbia)	October 2015	December 2015	15	7	3	5	46.67
Uzbekistan U23	(Uzbekistan)	March 2019		17	11	4	2	64.71
