= Moldovan =

Moldovan and Moldavian refer to something of, from, or related to Moldova or Moldavia. In particular, it may refer to:

- Moldovans, the main ethnic group of the Republic of Moldova
- Moldavians, the inhabitants of the historical territory of the Principality of Moldavia (14th century to 1859)
- Moldavians, residents of Moldavia (region of Romania)
- Moldovan language, the former name for the Romanian language as used in Moldova, until 2023
- Moldavian dialect, one of the several regional varieties of the Romanian language
- Moldovan (surname)

== See also ==
- Moldavians (disambiguation)
