= Paulo Rink =

German footballer (born 1973)

Personal information
- Full name: Paulo Roberto Rink
- Date of birth: 21 February 1973 (age 53)
- Place of birth: Curitiba, Paraná, Brazil
- Height: 1.84 m (6 ft 0 in)
- Position: Forward

Youth career
- 1989–1990: Atlético Paranaense

Senior career*
Years	Team	Apps	(Gls)
1990–1997	Atlético Paranaense	35	(14)
1991	→ Atlético Mineiro (loan)		
1995	→ Chapecoense (loan)	0	(0)
1997–2001	Bayer Leverkusen	88	(29)
1999	→ Santos (loan)	12	(0)
2002	1. FC Nürnberg	19	(3)
2002–2003	Energie Cottbus	13	(3)
2003	Olympiakos Nicosia	14	(9)
2004	Vitesse	17	(5)
2004	Jeonbuk Hyundai Motors	11	(1)
2005	Olympiakos Nicosia	21	(14)
2005–2006	Omonia Nicosia	13	(10)
2006–2007	Atlético Paranaense	13	(1)

International career
1998–2000	Germany	13	(0)
- * Club domestic league appearances and goals

Paulo Roberto Rink (born 21 February 1973) is a former footballer who played as a forward. Most commonly known for his time at Bayer Leverkusen, the Brazilian-born player earned 13 caps representing Germany. He retired in 2007.

== Club career ==
Born in Curitiba, Rink began his career playing for Athletico Paranaense. After a solid career with the club, he negotiated with Bayer Leverkusen, and was transferred for US$6 million, the highest transfer fee paid for an Athletico Paranaense player at that time. Rink remained there for four years, barring a six-month break, when he was loaned out to Santos FC.

He played for several other clubs, 1. FC Nürnberg, FC Energie Cottbus, Vitesse Arnhem, Jeonbuk Hyundai Motors, Olympiakos Nicosia and Omonia Nicosia.

Rink ended his career in Athletico Paranaense, where his career started. His honorary match took place on 24 May 2007 at the Kyocera Arena. Playing in Paulo Rink's friends team were amongst others: Oséas, his old friend, who from 1995 to 1998 acted as his striking partner at Athletico Paranaense. Also present was the Uruguayan Gustavo Matosas, teammate in 1997 and 1998 and Kléberson, who played with him in 1998.

== International career ==
Rink, whose great-grandfather had emigrated from Heidelberg to Brazil in 1904, was naturalised as a German citizen and subsequently called up to the Germany national team by then manager Berti Vogts in September 1998. He was the first Brazilian to play for Germany. The attacker took part in friendlies against Romania and Malta. A year later, while still playing for Bayer Leverkusen, he was once again called up, this time for the 1999 Confederations Cup in Mexico. He played for Germany in the 2000 UEFA European Championship as well. In total, Rink was able to collect 13 international caps between 1998 and 2000.
