= Miran Pavlin =

Slovenian footballer (born 1971)

Personal information
- Date of birth: 8 October 1971 (age 55)
- Place of birth: Kranj, SR Slovenia, Yugoslavia
- Height: 1.87 m (6 ft 2 in)
- Position: Midfielder

Youth career
- Triglav

Senior career*
Years	Team	Apps	(Gls)
1992–1993	Živila Naklo	30	(8)
1993–1996	Olimpija	71	(9)
1996–1997	Dynamo Dresden	29	(6)
1997–2000	SC Freiburg	61	(5)
1999–2000	→ Karlsruher SC (loan)	13	(0)
2000–2002	Porto	12	(1)
2002–2003	Olimpija	6	(0)
2003–2004	Olympiakos Nicosia	7	(0)
2004–2005	APOEL	3	(0)
2005–2009	Olimpija Ljubljana	64	(47)
2009–2010	Koper	32	(11)
Total		328	(74)

International career
1992	Slovenia U21	1	(0)
1994–2004	Slovenia	63	(5)
- * Club domestic league appearances and goals

Miran Pavlin (born 8 October 1971) is a Slovenian football executive and former player who played as midfielder. He featured for clubs such as Olimpija, SC Freiburg, Olympiakos Nicosia, APOEL, Porto and Olimpija Ljubljana.

As of August 2024, Pavlin is the sporting director at Nottingham Forest.

== Club career ==
In 2009, Pavlin joined Koper on a combined player-director of football contract. In his first season with Koper, he won the Slovenian PrvaLiga. His second season there started poorly – after a resounding 5–1 defeat away to Dinamo Zagreb in UEFA Champions League qualifiers, he announced his immediate retirement, only to return to the Koper team a week later for a single league match against Rudar Velenje. Soon, after another dispute with club leadership regarding player signings and departures, he left the club altogether.

== International career ==
Pavlin made 63 appearances for the senior Slovenia national team between 1994 and 2004, scoring five goals. He was a participant at the 2002 FIFA World Cup and UEFA Euro 2000. During the second leg of Slovenia's Euro 2000 play-off against Ukraine, it was Pavlin's goal which secured a 1–1 draw and an aggregate victory to send Slovenia to their first major tournament. His final international was an April 2004 friendly match away against Switzerland.

== Personal life ==
Luka Pavlin, who is also a footballer, is his nephew.

== Career statistics ==
=== International ===
Scores and results list Slovenia's goal tally first, score column indicates score after each Pavlin goal.

List of international goals scored by Miran Pavlin
No.	Date	Venue	Opponent	Score	Result	Competition
1	17 November 1999	Olimpiyskyi National Sports Complex, Kyiv, Ukraine	Ukraine	1–1	1–1	UEFA Euro 2000 qualifying
2	23 February 2000	Sultan Qaboos Sports Complex, Muscat, Oman	Oman	1–0	4–0	Friendly
3	13 June 2000	Stade du Pays de Charleroi, Charleroi, Belgium	FR Yugoslavia	2–0	3–3	UEFA Euro 2000
4	16 August 2000	Bazaly, Ostrava, Czech Republic	Czech Republic	1–0	1–0	Friendly
5	17 April 2002	Bežigrad Stadium, Ljubljana, Slovenia	Tunisia	1–0	1–0	Friendly

== Honours ==
Porto

- Taça de Portugal: 2000–01

Koper

- Slovenian PrvaLiga: 2009–10
