= Philip Sharp (referee) =

English football referee (born 1964)

- Born: 5 April 1964 (age 62); United Kingdom

Domestic
Years	League	Role

International
Years	League	Role
1997–	FIFA	Assistant referee

Philip Sharp (born 5 April 1964) is a former English Premier League assistant referee and one of only 10 match officials from the United Kingdom to have officiated in a FIFA World Cup Final.

== Career ==
Sharp first played football for Livingstone School but became a referee via the Duke of Edinburgh's Award Scheme in order to fulfil the Service in the Community component of the course. He gained his apprenticeship through the Hertfordshire County League before gaining promotion onto the Southern Football League middle from where he was promoted to panel referee for two seasons before being promoted as an assistant referee to the Football League and, finally, the Premier League. He was selected to run the line at the 1999 FA Cup Final. Sharp currently referees on the national contributory list of match referees.

Sharp was promoted to the FIFA list of match officials on 1 January 1997. His progression, internationally, was exceptional being appointed to hold the flag in the opening game of his first senior tournament, the year 2000 European Championship and the semi-final of that tournament. In the 2002 FIFA World Cup Sharp was appointed to five games in total, including the Croatia v Italy match and the final between Germany and Brazil. As such he was England's second successive match official at a Final match, Mark Warren having been the assistant referee at the 1998 FIFA World Cup Final.

Sharp was selected to represent Great Britain at the 2004 Olympic Games football tournament and represented England at the 2006 FIFA World Cup in Germany.

On 18 October 2008, Sharp was hit by an object thrown from the crowd in the game between Aston Villa and Portsmouth. It resulted in a cut to his face, although he was eventually fit to continue till the end of the game. The police subsequently arrested a man from Birmingham and charged him with battery.

He now works for the Hertfordshire FA as the referee development officer.

In 2010 he started instructing as an assistant referee coach and invited to Turkey, Cyprus, Scotland, Wales and Northern Ireland to help develop their assistant referees. For the UEFA Euro 2012 tournament in Poland and Ukraine, he was the specialist assistant referee coach to prepare the assistant referees before and during the tournament. In 2018, he was also requested to do the same again for the European Championships in France.
