= Moldavians =

Moldavians or Moldavian may refer to:

- Moldavians, residents of the medieval Principality of Moldavia (14th century to 1859), currently divided between Romania, Moldova and Ukraine
- Moldavians, residents of the historical region of Moldavia, specially of Western Moldavia
- Moldovans, residents of Moldova, a country in Eastern Europe

== See also ==
- Moldovan (disambiguation)
