= Slobodan Komljenović =

Serbian footballer (born 1971)

Personal information
- Date of birth: 2 January 1971 (age 55)
- Place of birth: Frankfurt, West Germany
- Height: 1.88 m (6 ft 2 in)
- Position: Defender

Youth career
- 1977–1985: SG Griesheim
- 1985–1989: SG 01 Hoechst

Senior career*
Years	Team	Apps	(Gls)
1989–1990	SG 01 Hoechst	19	(0)
1990–1992	Eintracht Frankfurt II	18	(1)
1992–1997	Eintracht Frankfurt	134	(5)
1997–1999	MSV Duisburg	64	(3)
1999–2001	1. FC Kaiserslautern	39	(3)
2001–2003	Zaragoza	38	(2)
2004	Wacker Burghausen	15	(1)
2004–2006	1860 Munich	35	(0)
2007	Union Weißkirchen	8	(0)
Total		370	(15)

International career
1994–2000	FR Yugoslavia	22	(3)

Managerial career
- 2010–2011: Eintracht Frankfurt (youth)
- 2011–2013: FSV Frankfurt (youth)
- 2013–2015: Viktoria Aschaffenburg
- 2016–2018: Alemannia Haibach
- 2018–2020: Rot-Weiss Frankfurt
- 2021: Vatan Spor
- * Club domestic league appearances and goals

Slobodan Komljenović (Serbian Cyrillic: Слободан Комљеновић, born 2 January 1971) is a Serbian football manager and retired footballer who played as either a central or right defender.

He played several years in Germany in representation of five teams, namely Eintracht Frankfurt, also representing Zaragoza in Spain for two and a half seasons.

At international level, Komljenović appeared for Yugoslavia in one World Cup and one European Championship. He earned a total of 22 caps, scoring 3 goals.

== Club career ==
Born in Frankfurt, West Germany, Komljenović joined hometown side Eintracht Frankfurt in 1990, from amateurs SG 01 Hoechst. He made his Bundesliga debut on 21 November 1992, playing the full 90 minutes in a 0–0 away draw against FC Schalke 04, and finished his debut season with 18 first-team appearances, being a very important defensive unit in the following years, and suffering top flight relegation in 1996.

Komljenović returned to the top division with MSV Duisburg, only missing three games with the Zebras in his two seasons combined, and helping them to two consecutive eighth-place finishes. In 1999, he moved to 1. FC Kaiserslautern, helping the club qualify to the UEFA Cup in his first season, but being sparingly used in his second, where he played seven times in the team's quarterfinal run in European competition.

Aged 30, Komljenović signed for Real Zaragoza in La Liga, appearing 15 times in his first season, which ended in relegation. In January 2004, after having contributed to the Aragonese return to the top division but spending the following months without any official appearances, he returned to Germany and joined SV Wacker Burghausen in the second division.

After two seasons in the same category with TSV 1860 Munich, Komljenović retired from football at the age of 35, amassing German top flight totals of 210 games and ten goals. In January 2007, after taking a six-month break, he signed for Union Weißkirchen in Austria (third level) and, in June of the following year, he joined another semi-professional side, VfR Jettingen from Bavaria, competing in Bezirksliga Schwaben-Nord, the eight-tier of German football league system.

During the 2009–10 season, Komljenović returned to the land of his ancestors and became the director of football at Bosnian club FK Laktaši. At the time of his arrival to the post, the club was dead last in the league standings, and finally suffered top flight relegation as second from last.

== International career ==
Komljenović made his debut for FR Yugoslavia on 23 December 1994, in a 0–2 friendly defeat with Brazil. Even though he played no part in the 1998 FIFA World Cup qualifying campaign, he was selected by manager Slobodan Santrač for the finals in France, where he would score twice in only three games, against the United States in the group stage (1–0) and against the Netherlands in the round of 16 (1–2 loss).

Komljenović also appeared at the UEFA Euro 2000 in Belgium and the Netherlands, making three appearances (270 minutes) and netting – and being booked – in the 3–4 group stage loss against Spain. He played his final international at the tournament.

== Personal life ==
Komljenović married Ivana Stepanović, daughter of his former Eintracht Frankfurt manager Dragoslav Stepanović. The couple have two children.

== Career statistics ==
Appearances and goals by national team and year
National team	Year	Apps	Goals
FR Yugoslavia	1994	2	0
FR Yugoslavia	1995	1	0
FR Yugoslavia	1996	0	0
FR Yugoslavia	1997	0	0
FR Yugoslavia	1998	11	2
FR Yugoslavia	1999	2	0
FR Yugoslavia	2000	6	1
Total		22	3

== Honours ==
- DFB-Pokal: runner-up 1997–98
