= Paul Bosvelt =

Dutch footballer and coach (born 1970)

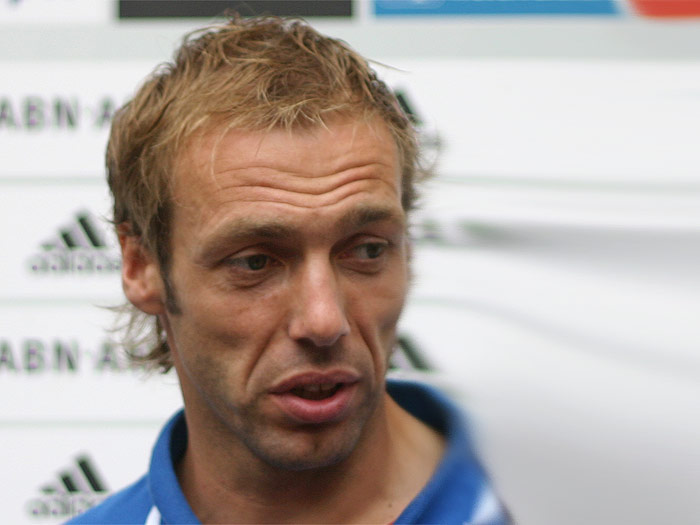

Personal information
- Date of birth: 26 March 1970 (age 56)
- Place of birth: Doetinchem, Netherlands
- Height: 1.83 m (6 ft 0 in)
- Position: Defensive midfielder

Team information
- Current team: Go Ahead Eagles (technical director)

Senior career*
Years	Team	Apps	(Gls)
1989–1994	Go Ahead Eagles	139	(27)
1994–1997	Twente	96	(21)
1997–2003	Feyenoord	177	(33)
2003–2005	Manchester City	53	(2)
2005–2007	Heerenveen	58	(5)
Total		523	(88)

International career
2000–2004	Netherlands	24	(0)

Managerial career
- 2016–2017: Jong FC Twente
Medal record
Men's football
Representing Netherlands
UEFA European Championship
Bronze medal – third place	2000
Bronze medal – third place	2004
- * Club domestic league appearances and goals

Paul Bosvelt (Dutch pronunciation: [ˈpʌul ˈbɔsfɛlt], born 26 March 1970) is a Dutch football coach and former professional footballer who is technical director of Go Ahead Eagles.

As a player he was a midfielder who notably played in the Eredivisie for FC Twente and Feyenoord and in the Premier League for Manchester City. He also had spells with Go Ahead Eagles and SC Heerenveen. He was capped 24 times by Netherlands.

As a coach he returned to Go Ahead Eagles as assistant manager, later returning to FC Twente as under-17 manager and a spell as Netherlands U21 assistant coach.

== Club career ==
Bosvelt went on to develop a reputation as a "hard-tackling midfielder" at de Kuip, making 167 appearances, during which he led Feyenoord to the league title in 1999 and the UEFA Cup in 2002.

During the game against Manchester United at home, on 5 November 1997, for the Champions League, which United eventually won 1–3, he tackled Denis Irwin from behind so "ferociously" that he almost broke the Irishman's leg. Irwin stayed off the field for several weeks to recover from the injury and was unable to join Ireland's national team. A few days after the game, United made public the fact that Bosvelt sent a fax to Irwin at Old Trafford, soon after the incident, in which he said that he "regretted making the tackle."

In 2003, Bosvelt joined Manchester City. After two seasons there, he returned to the Netherlands and finished his career playing for SC Heerenveen.

Bosvelt retired from football on 13 May 2007, after Heerenveen's 4–0 defeat by Ajax. He had played a total number of 470 games in both Eredivisie and Eerste Divisie. In December 2008 it was confirmed, that Bosvelt from 1 January 2009 would become the new assistant coach of Go Ahead Eagles.

== International career ==
Three days after his thirtieth birthday, Bosvelt made his debut for the Netherlands on 29 March 2000 in a friendly match against Belgium, he went on to earn a total of 24 caps, scoring no goals. He played in Euro 2000 and Euro 2004. During Euro 2000, he reached the semi-final with Netherlands. Bosvelt missed an important penalty kick in the penalty shootout in the semi-finals, which led to a 3–1 defeat against Italy. At Euro 2004 Bosvelt was initially named on the stand-by list, but was then added to the squad after Mark van Bommel withdrew through injury. Bosvelt came on as a substitute for Arjen Robben in the group game against the Czech Republic. The Netherlands were winning 2-1 when Bosvelt was introduced but ultimately lost 3-2. Dick Advocaat's decision to sub Bosvelt on in place of Robben was considered a turning point in the match and was widely criticised in the Dutch media. Bosvelt did not feature again for the Netherlands.

== Coaching career ==
After his contract in Go Ahead Eagles, he joined FC Twente in June 2012 as an assistant coach for the club's U19s. Two years later, in June 2014, he took charge of Twente's U17s. Beside that, he was also appointed assistant coach for the Dutch U21 national team.

In summer 2016, Bosvelt was named manager of Jong FC Twente next to his position as an assistant for the Dutch U-21 national team. However, he ended the season with relegation from the Tweede Divisie and was fired at the end of the season.

In December 2017, Bosvelt returned to Go Ahead Eagles and was hired as technical advisor, still next to his position on the Dutch U-21 national team, which he, however, left at the end of August 2018.

In April 2018, Bosvelt was hired in a new role at Go Ahead Eagles: he was announced as the new technical director. In November 2021, he signed a new contract with Go Ahead Eagles until June 2024.

== Honours ==
Feyenoord

- Eredivisie: 1998–99
- Johan Cruyff Shield: 1999
- UEFA Cup: 2001–02
