= Dejan Govedarica =

Serbian footballer

Personal information
- Date of birth: 2 October 1969 (age 57)
- Place of birth: Zrenjanin, SR Serbia, SFR Yugoslavia
- Height: 1.91 m (6 ft 3 in)
- Position: Midfielder

Youth career
- Radnički Sutjeska

Senior career*
Years	Team	Apps	(Gls)
1989–1992	Proleter Zrenjanin	75	(16)
1992–1995	Vojvodina	102	(23)
1996–1997	Volendam	37	(8)
1997–1998	Lecce	21	(1)
1998–2002	RKC Waalwijk	78	(7)
2002–2004	NEC Nijmegen	56	(2)
2004–2005	Vojvodina	14	(1)
Total		383	(58)

International career
1994–2000	FR Yugoslavia	29	(2)

Managerial career
- 2006–2007: Serbia U21 (assistant)
- 2011: Serbia U19
- 2014–2015: Serbia U17
- 2016–2018: Guangzhou R&F (assistant)
- * Club domestic league appearances and goals

Dejan Govedarica (Serbian Cyrillic: Дејан Говедарица, pronounced [dějan ɡoʋedǎritsa]; born 2 October 1969) is a Serbian retired footballer who played as a midfielder.

== Club career ==
Govedarica played three seasons for Proleter Zrenjanin between 1989 and 1992, before switching to Vojvodina. He then spent three and half years in Novi Sad, making 102 appearances and scoring 23 goals in the top flight.

In the 1996 winter transfer window, Govedarica moved abroad and joined the Dutch club Volendam. He was transferred to Serie A side Lecce in 1997, but was unable to help them avoid relegation.

After one season in Italy, Govedarica didn't want to play in Serie B so he moved back to the Netherlands and signed with RKC Waalwijk, spending the next four seasons with the club. He was subsequently signed by NEC Nijmegen on a two-year contract. In 2004, Govedarica returned to Vojvodina.

== International career ==
At international level, Govedarica was capped 29 times and scored two goals for FR Yugoslavia from 1994 to 2000. He participated at the 1998 FIFA World Cup and UEFA Euro 2000. His final international was at the lattertournament against the Netherlands.

== Managerial career ==
After hanging up his boots, Govedarica started his managerial career as an assistant to Miroslav Đukić with the Serbia national under-21 football team, finishing as runners-up in the 2007 UEFA European Under-21 Championship.

== Career statistics ==
Appearances and goals by national team and year
National team	Year	Apps	Goals
FR Yugoslavia	1994	1	0
FR Yugoslavia	1995	6	0
FR Yugoslavia	1996	1	1
FR Yugoslavia	1997	9	0
FR Yugoslavia	1998	5	0
FR Yugoslavia	1999	2	0
FR Yugoslavia	2000	5	1
Total		29	2
