= Viorel Moldovan =

Romanian footballer and manager

Personal information
- Full name: Viorel Dinu Moldovan
- Date of birth: 8 July 1972 (age 54)
- Place of birth: Bistrița, Romania
- Height: 1.77 m (5 ft 10 in)
- Position: Striker

Youth career
- 1984–1989: Gloria Bistrița

Senior career*
Years	Team	Apps	(Gls)
1989–1993	Gloria Bistrița	86	(15)
1993–1995	Dinamo București	60	(19)
1995–1996	Neuchâtel Xamax	32	(19)
1996–1997	Grasshoppers	51	(44)
1998	Coventry City	10	(1)
1998–2000	Fenerbahçe	53	(33)
2000–2004	Nantes	69	(31)
2003	→ Al-Wahda (loan)	1	(0)
2004	Servette	13	(3)
2005	Politehnica Timișoara	23	(8)
2006–2007	Rapid București	41	(15)
Total		439	(188)

International career
1991–1993	Romania U21	16	(3)
1993–2005	Romania	70	(25)

Managerial career
- 2007: Rapid București (sporting director)
- 2007–2008: Unirea Urziceni (sporting director)
- 2008–2009: Vaslui
- 2009–2010: FC Brașov
- 2010: Sportul Studențesc
- 2013–2014: Rapid București
- 2014: Romania U21
- 2014–2016: Romania (assistant)
- 2016: Auxerre
- 2018–2020: Chindia Târgoviște
- 2020–2021: Petrolul Ploiești
- 2024–2025: Rapid București (president)
- * Club domestic league appearances and goals

Viorel Dinu Moldovan (born 8 July 1972) is a Romanian football manager and former player.

A former striker, Moldovan's most successful career years were playing for Neuchâtel Xamax and Grasshoppers from 1996 to 1998 in Switzerland (he was the Nationalliga A top scorer in 1996 and 1997), for Fenerbahçe between 1998 and 2000 and for Nantes from 2000 until 2004. He was a key player when Nantes won the French Division 1 in 2001. He represented Romania in two editions of the World Cup, those held in the United States in 1994 and France in 1998, as well as two European Championships in 1996 and 2000.

== Club career ==
=== Gloria Bistrița and Dinamo București ===
Moldovan was born on 8 July 1972 in Bistrița, Romania and began playing junior-level football at local club Gloria. He started his senior career by playing for Gloria during the 1988–89 Divizia B season. In the following season he helped the team earn promotion to Divizia A. Subsequently, he made his debut in the competition on 21 October 1990 under coach Remus Vlad in a 1–0 home loss to Petrolul Ploiești.

In 1993 he went to play for Dinamo București. There, he made his debut in European competitions, scoring a double in the 4–3 aggregate loss to Cagliari in the first round of the 1993–94 UEFA Cup.

=== Neuchâtel Xamax and Grasshoppers ===
In 1995, Moldovan went to play for Neuchâtel Xamax, making his Nationalliga A debut on 29 July under coach Gilbert Gress in a 1–0 home win over Basel. In the next round he netted his first goals in the competition, managing a brace in a 3–0 victory against Lugano. Until the end of his first season, he netted 19 goals which earned him the top-scorer of the season title alongside Lugano's Petar Aleksandrov, also being named the league's Foreigner of the Year.

In the following season he played for Grasshoppers, scoring a goal on his debut in a 1–1 draw against Sion. Until the end of the season, he netted a personal record of 27 goals, including two hat-tricks in victories against Young Boys and Lausanne-Sport, being again the top-scorer of the season and the Foreigner of the Year. In the same season, Moldovan scored a goal which helped the club eliminate Slavia Prague in the 1996–97 Champions League qualifying round, reaching the group stage where he made five appearances and scored a brace in a 3–1 victory against Auxerre. For the way he played in 1996, Moldovan was placed third in the ranking for the Romanian Footballer of the Year award. In the next season he netted two hat-tricks in two wins against his former club, Neuchâtel Xamax and Servette respectively. He scored 17 league goals until the end of the first half of the season, and though he left afterwards, the team managed to win the title without him. During his spell with The Hoppers, Moldovan also scored three goals which helped the team earn two victories in the Zurich derby against FC Zürich.

=== Coventry City ===
In 1998, Coventry City paid 10 million Swiss francs to Grasshoppers for Moldovan's transfer. He made his Premier League debut on 10 January 1998 when coach Gordon Strachan sent him in the 58th minute to replace John Salako in a 3–1 away loss to Chelsea. During his brief spell in England he scored twice, first the winner against local rivals Aston Villa in the FA Cup and then another in a 3–0 league win against Crystal Palace, also having a goal disallowed in that same game. He had a hard time earning his place in the team, as the first options for the offence were Dion Dublin and Darren Huckerby.

=== Fenerbahçe ===
Moldovan's next spell was at Fenerbahçe, making his Turkish First Football League debut on 7 August 1998 when coach Joachim Löw used him the entire match in a 0–0 draw against Dardanelspor. In the following round he netted his first goals, managing a double in a 3–0 victory against Gençlerbirliği. He scored a total of 15 goals until the end of the season, including a hat-trick in a 6–0 win over Adanaspor. Moldovan also scored a goal in a 1–0 victory against Parma in the first round of the 1998–99 UEFA Cup, but the qualification was lost as the Italians defeated them 3–1 in the second leg. He started the 1999–2000 season by scoring a goal in a 4–1 away win over İstanbulspor, netting a total of 18 goals in that season, including another hat-trick in another victory against Adanaspor.

=== Nantes and Al-Wahda ===
Afterwards Moldovan joined Nantes which paid €5 million to Fenerbahçe for his transfer, and Moldovan earned there the nickname Moldo-but thanks to his goalscoring ability. He made his debut in the French Division 1 on 19 August 2000 when coach Raynald Denoueix sent him in the 71st minute to replace Olivier Monterrubio, managing to score the victory goal in the 90th minute of the 3–2 win over Marseille. Until the end of the season, he netted 11 goals in 23 matches which helped the club win the championship. In the same season, The Canaries participated in the UEFA Cup, Moldovan helping the club eliminate Kryvbas and Lausanne-Sport, netting a hat-trick against the first and scoring two goals against the latter, reaching the round of 16 where they were defeated by Porto. He started the following season by winning the Trophée des Champions, coach Denoueix using him as a starter in the 4–1 win over Strasbourg. He then played in three games in the 2001–02 Champions League second group stage, scoring two goals in two 1–1 draws against Manchester United and Boavista.

In 2003, coach Rolland Courbis convinced him to sign with Al-Wahda. However, Moldovan made only one appearance in the UAE Football League, claiming he couldn't adapt due to the hot climate.

Afterwards he went back to Nantes, scoring 11 goals in 12 league appearances in the second half of the 2003–04 season, including two doubles in victories against Nice and rivals Rennes and a hat-trick in 3–2 win over Montpellier. In the same season, the team reached the 2004 Coupe de la Ligue final, Moldovan being used as a starter by coach Loïc Amisse in the loss at the penalty shoot-out to Sochaux in which he netted his spot kick.

=== Servette ===
Moldovan returned to Switzerland when he signed with Servette, making his debut for the team on 20 July 2004 as coach Marco Schällibaum used him the entire match in a 3–0 away loss to FC Thun. Moldovan scored his first goal in a 1–1 draw against Schaffhausen. On 5 December 2004 he played his last game in the Swiss league when he also scored in Servette's 4–1 away win over Schaffhausen, totaling 96 matches with 66 goals in the competition.

=== Politehnica Timișoara and Rapid București ===
In 2005, Moldovan returned to Romania, signing with Politehnica Timișoara, and coach Cosmin Olăroiu gave him his debut on 11 March when he scored in the 3–0 victory against CFR Cluj. In the following game, he netted the victory goal from a penalty in the 2–1 win over Național București. For the next season, coach Olăroiu named him the team's captain. On 10 September 2005 he scored a brace in a 4–0 win over his former team Gloria Bistrița.

In early 2006 he was transferred from Politehnica to Rapid București. Moldovan helped the club eliminate Hamburg and reach the quarter-finals of the 2005–06 UEFA Cup where he scored his side's only goal against rivals Steaua București as they were eliminated on the away goal rule after a 1–1 on aggregate. On 12 April 2006 he scored a brace in a 3–0 win in a derby against Dinamo București. At the end of the season, the club won the Cupa României, coach Răzvan Lucescu sending him in the 55th minute to replace Daniel Pancu in the 1–0 victory against Național București in the final.

Afterwards he wanted to retire but Lucescu convinced him to play for one more season. He then netted a goal which helped The Railwaymen eliminate Nacional and reach the group stage of the 2006–07 UEFA Cup. There, Moldovan would make his last four appearances in European competitions in which he accumulated a total of 43 matches and 19 goals scored. He netted seven league goals during his last season of activity, including two doubles in victories against FC Vaslui and Gloria Bistrița. On 23 May 2007, Moldovan played his last game in the Romanian top-league which ended with a 4–0 loss to Național București, totaling 196 appearances with 55 goals in the competition. He ended his career by winning another Cupa României, this time coach Lucescu sending him in the 82nd minute to replace Ionuț Mazilu in Rapid's 2–0 victory against Politehnica Timișoara in the final.

== International career ==
=== Early years and 1994 World Cup ===
Moldovan played 70 matches and scored 25 goals for Romania, making his debut on 22 September 1993 at age 21 under coach Anghel Iordănescu in a 1–0 friendly win over Israel. He was selected by Iordănescu to be part of the 1994 World Cup squad where the team reached the quarter-finals, but he did not play in any games from the campaign. He scored his first goals for the national team on 24 April 1996, managing a hat-trick in a friendly that ended with a 5–0 victory against Georgia.

=== Euro 1996 ===
Moldovan played in one game in the successful Euro 1996 qualifiers, a 2–0 away win over Slovakia. He was sent as a substitute by Iordănescu in the 1–0 losses to France and Bulgaria during the final tournament, and the team also lost the game against Spain, being unable to progress from their group.

=== 1998 World Cup ===
During the 1998 World Cup qualifiers, he made eight appearances, scoring two goals in both victories against Liechtenstein, two goals in both wins over Lithuania and a brace in a 4–2 victory against Macedonia. Moldovan was used as a starter by Iordănescu in all four games in the final tournament. In the group stage, Romania earned victories in the first two rounds against Colombia and England, Moldovan scoring once against the latter, thus securing mathematical qualification before the last group match against Tunisia. To celebrate, the team dyed their hair blonde and showed up on the pitch with their new look, Moldovan netting his side's goal in the 1–1 draw against the Tunisians. The campaign ended as they were defeated 1–0 by Croatia in the round of 16 after Davor Šuker scored from a penalty.

=== Euro 2000 ===
Moldovan played 10 games in the Euro 2000 qualifiers and scored one goal in a 7–0 win over Liechtenstein, his side's goal in the 1–1 draw against rivals Hungary and a double in a 5–1 away victory against Slovakia. Coach Emerich Jenei used him as a starter in all four matches during the final tournament, netting a goal in the 1–1 draw against Germany in the group stage. In the last group match, against England, he obtained a penalty in the 89th minute from which Ionel Ganea scored the victory goal in the 3–2 win that helped The Tricolours reach the quarter-finals. Over there, the campaign ended as they lost 2–0 to Italy.

=== Final years ===
In his final years with the national team, Moldovan played six games and netted once in a 2–1 victory against Lithuania during the 2002 World Cup qualifiers. He then played two matches in the Euro 2004 qualifiers, scoring a brace in a 7–0 win over Luxembourg. His last two appearances were during the Euro 2004 qualifiers, the last one taking place on 30 March 2005 in a 2–1 away victory against Macedonia.

For representing his country at four final tournaments, Moldovan was decorated by then President of Romania, Traian Băsescu on 25 March 2008, with the Ordinul "Meritul Sportiv" – (The Medal of "Sportive Merit") Class III.

== Managerial career ==
After he ended his career, Moldovan started working as a sporting director for Rapid București during the year 2007. Afterwards he went to work for Unirea Urziceni in the same position until 2008.

He started his coaching career when he replaced Viorel Hizo at FC Vaslui in November 2008. However, on 26 May 2009 he resigned from Vaslui after a 4–1 loss to Gloria Buzău which lowered the team's chances of finishing on a place that would grant them participation in a European competition. On 28 July 2009, the Italian coach Nicolò Napoli quit FC Brașov and was replaced by Moldovan, who signed a two-year deal. After a good start, the team eventually finished the season in 9th place and he left the club. In September 2010, Moldovan was named the coach of Sportul Studențesc but left the club in late October after not managing to earn a single victory in the league during this time. From September 2013 until July 2014 he coached Rapid in Liga II, managing to earn promotion to the first league at the end of the season.

In 2014 he was named by the Romanian Football Federation as coach of Romania's under-21 national team. Later in that year he became an assistant of head coach Anghel Iordănescu at Romania's senior squad, helping it qualify to the Euro 2016 final tournament. After the tournament in which The Tricolours did not get past the group stage, he was appointed as the head coach of Ligue 2 team, Auxerre. After nine games in which he earned only one victory, Moldovan was dismissed because after a loss to Le Havre he publicly criticized the club officials for not bringing more players to the club.

About two years later, on 26 June 2018 he was named coach of Liga II team, Chindia Târgoviște, managing to promote them to the first league at the end of the season. Because by the end of the following season, Chindia was on a relegation place, Moldovan was dismissed by the club. In August 2020, he returned to Liga II football, signing with Petrolul Ploiești, having as an objective to achieve promotion to the first league. In March 2021 he resigned from Petrolul as the team was only in 10th place.

In June 2024 Moldovan was appointed as president of Rapid, a position he held for exactly one year, leaving after the team finished the 2024–25 Liga I season in fifth place.

== Personal life ==
His father, Vasile, was also a footballer who played 10 years for Gloria Bistrița.

In 1994, Moldovan received the Honorary Citizen of Bucharest title. In 2002, he was named Honorary Citizen of Bistrița. On 29 March 2006, he was decorated by the President of Romania, Traian Băsescu, with the Ordinul "Meritul Sportiv" (Order of "Sporting Merit"), Class II, for his contribution to reaching the 2005–06 UEFA Cup quarter-finals with Rapid București.

== Career statistics ==
Appearances and goals by national team and year
National team	Year	Apps	Goals
Romania	1993	1	0
Romania	1994	3	0
Romania	1995	1	0
Romania	1996	9	4
Romania	1997	7	5
Romania	1998	13	8
Romania	1999	10	2
Romania	2000	11	2
Romania	2001	8	2
Romania	2002	4	2
Romania	2003	1	0
Romania	2004	0	0
Romania	2005	2	0
Total		70	25

Scores and results list Romania's goal tally first, score column indicates score after each Moldovan goal.

List of international goals scored by Viorel Moldovan
No.	Date	Venue	Opponent	Score	Result	Competition
1	24 April 1996	Stadionul Steaua, Bucharest, Romania	Georgia	1–0	5–0	Friendly
2	24 April 1996	Stadionul Steaua, Bucharest, Romania	Georgia	2–0	5–0	Friendly
3	24 April 1996	Stadionul Steaua, Bucharest, Romania	Georgia	3–0	5–0	Friendly
4	31 August 1996	Stadionul Steaua, Bucharest, Romania	Lithuania	1–0	3–0	1998 FIFA World Cup qualification
5	29 March 1997	Stadionul Steaua, Bucharest, Romania	Liechtenstein	1–0	8–0	1998 FIFA World Cup qualification
6	2 April 1997	Žalgiris Stadium, Vilnius, Lithuania	Lithuania	1–0	1–0	1998 FIFA World Cup qualification
7	20 August 1997	Stadionul Steaua, Bucharest, Romania	Macedonia	1–0	4–2	1998 FIFA World Cup qualification
8	20 August 1997	Stadionul Steaua, Bucharest, Romania	Macedonia	3–1	4–2	1998 FIFA World Cup qualification
9	6 September 1997	Sportpark Eschen-Mauren, Eschen, Liechtenstein	Liechtenstein	1–0	8–1	1998 FIFA World Cup qualification
10	8 April 1998	Stadionul Steaua, Bucharest, Romania	Greece	1–0	2–1	Friendly
11	22 April 1998	King Baudouin Stadium, Brussels, Belgium	Belgium	1–0	1–1	Friendly
12	6 June 1998	Ilie Oană Stadium, Ploiești, Romania	Moldova	4–0	5–1	Friendly
13	22 June 1998	Stadium Municipal, Toulouse, France	England	1–0	2–1	1998 FIFA World Cup
14	26 June 1998	Stade de France, Saint Denis, France	Tunisia	1–1	1–1	1998 FIFA World Cup
15	2 September 1998	Stadionul Steaua, Bucharest, Romania	Liechtenstein	6–0	7–0	UEFA Euro 2000 qualifying
16	5 September 1998	Ta' Qali, Attard, Malta	Germany	1–0	1–1	Friendly
17	14 October 1998	Népstadion, Budapest, Hungary	Hungary	1–0	1–1	UEFA Euro 2000 qualifying
18	4 September 1999	Tehelné pole, Bratislava, Slovakia	Slovakia	4–1	5–1	UEFA Euro 2000 qualifying
19	4 September 1999	Tehelné pole, Bratislava, Slovakia	Slovakia	5–1	5–1	UEFA Euro 2000 qualifying
20	27 May 2000	Amsterdam ArenA, Amsterdam, Netherlands	Netherlands	1–2	1–2	Friendly
21	12 June 2000	Stade de Sclessin, Liège, Belgium	Germany	1–0	1–1	UEFA Euro 2000
22	6 June 2001	Darius and Girėnas Stadium, Kaunas, Lithuania	Lithuania	2–0	2–1	2002 FIFA World Cup qualification
23	15 August 2001	Bežigrad Stadium, Ljubljana, Slovenia	Slovenia	2–1	2–2	Friendly
24	16 October 2002	Stade Josy Barthel, Luxembourg, Luxembourg	Luxembourg	1–0	7–0	UEFA Euro 2004 qualifying
25	16 October 2002	Stade Josy Barthel, Luxembourg, Luxembourg	Luxembourg	2–0	7–0	UEFA Euro 2004 qualifying

== Honours ==
=== Player ===
Gloria Bistrița

- Divizia B: 1989–90

Grasshoppers

- Nationalliga A: 1997–98

Nantes

- French Division 1: 2000–01
- Coupe de la Ligue runner-up: 2003–04
- Trophée des Champions: 2001

Rapid București

- Cupa României: 2005–06, 2006–07
- Supercupa României runner-up: 2006

Individual

- Nationalliga A top scorer: 1995–96 (joint with Petar Aleksandrov), 1996–97
- Swiss Foreign Footballer of the Year: 1995–96, 1996–97
- Romanian Footballer of the Year (third place): 1996

=== Manager ===
Chindia Târgoviște

- Liga II: 2018–19
