= UEFA Euro 2000 =

11th European association football championship

Europees Voetbalkampioenschap België/Nederland 2000 (in Dutch) Championnat d'Europe de football Belgique/Pays-Bas 2000 (in French) Fußball-Europameisterschaft Belgien/Niederlande 2000 (in German)
- Football without frontiers

Tournament details
- Host countries: Belgium; Netherlands
- Dates: 10 June – 2 July
- Teams: 16
- Venues: 8 (in 8 host cities)

Final positions
- Champions: France (2nd title)
- Runners-up: Italy
- Third place: Portugal; Netherlands

Tournament statistics
- Matches played: 31
- Goals scored: 85 (2.74 per match)
- Attendance: 1,122,833 (36,220 per match)
- Top scorer(s): (Federal Republic of Yugoslavia) Savo Milošević (Netherlands) Patrick Kluivert (5 goals each)
- Best player: (France) Zinedine Zidane

The 2000 UEFA European Football Championship, also known as Euro 2000, was the 11th UEFA European Championship, a football tournament held every four years and organised by UEFA, the sport's governing body in Europe.

The finals tournament was played between 10 June and 2 July 2000, and co-hosted by Belgium and the Netherlands, the first time the tournament had been held in more than one nation. Spain and Austria also bid to host the event. The finals tournament was contested by 16 nations; with the exception of the hosts, Belgium and the Netherlands, the finalists had to go through a qualifying tournament to reach the final stage. France won the tournament by defeating Italy 2–1 in the final, via a golden goal. Germany were defending champions but were eliminated in the group stage.

The finals saw the first major UEFA competition contested in the King Baudouin Stadium (formerly the Heysel Stadium) since the events of the 1985 European Cup final and the Heysel Stadium disaster, with the opening game being played in the rebuilt stadium.

With many high scoring games and a positive standard of play, Euro 2000 is often labelled by football writers as one of the greatest international tournaments of all time.

== Bid process ==
Belgium and the Netherlands were selected as co-hosts on 14 July 1995 by the UEFA Executive Committee at a meeting in Geneva, Switzerland.

=== Hooliganism concerns ===
Football hooliganism was a significant problem in the Netherlands in the 1990s, especially the fierce rivalry between Ajax and Feyenoord. There were concerns that hooliganism would overshadow the finals. Many instances of violence occurred, including several football riots in Rotterdam between 1995 and 1999, which would host the Euro 2000 final. One of the most infamous incidents was the Battle of Beverwijk in 1997. Although the violence is normally associated with domestic clubs, there were concerns that it could attach to the Dutch national team.

Violence did eventually occur during the Euro 2000 finals, albeit not involving the Dutch team. On 17 June, 174 England fans were arrested in Brussels, Belgium, following violence with Germans and local Turkish groups ahead of an England v Germany match.

== Summary ==
Belgium had a surprise exit in the group stage, winning the tournament's first game against Sweden, but losing to Turkey and Italy. They finished third in Group B, behind Italy and Turkey. The other co-host and favourite, the Netherlands, progressed as expected from Group D, along with World Cup winners France. The Netherlands won the group, by beating a second-string France in their last group match. Also in Group D, Denmark's three losses with eight goals conceded and none scored set a new record for the worst team performance in the group stages of a Euros. Group C was memorable for the match between FR Yugoslavia and Spain. Spain needed a win to ensure progression, but found themselves trailing 3–2 after Slobodan Komljenović scored in the 75th minute. The Spanish side rescued their tournament by scoring twice in injury time to record a 4–3 victory. FR Yugoslavia managed to go through as well, despite losing because Norway and Slovenia played to a draw. One of the biggest surprises of the tournament was Portugal, winning Group A with three wins, including their second-string getting a 3–0 victory against Germany, with Sérgio Conceição scoring a hat-trick, and a 3–2 victory against England, in which they came back from 2–0 down. Romania was the other qualifier from the group, beating England with a late penalty in their last group game.

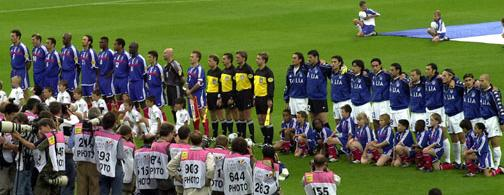
France and Italy before the final on 2 July

Italy and Portugal maintained their perfect records in the quarter-finals, beating Romania and Turkey, respectively. Netherlands started a goal-avalanche against FR Yugoslavia, winning 6–1, with Dutch striker Patrick Kluivert originally credited with four goals, but the third was later re-attributed as an own goal by Yugoslavia's Dejan Govedarica, after Kluivert admitted not getting a touch on Paul Bosvelt's cross; otherwise Kluivert would have become the first player to score four times in a European Championship match. Spain fell 2–1 to France; Raúl missed a late penalty that ended Spanish hopes.

Italy eliminated the Netherlands in the semi-finals after a 0-0 draw, despite going down to ten men and facing two penalty kicks. Italian goalkeeper Francesco Toldo, who had been drafted into the starting XI as Gianluigi Buffon missed the tournament through injury, made two saves in the penalty shootout – apart from his penalty save in normal time on – to carry the Italians to the final. The Dutch converted just one spot kick which was Patrick Kluivert's in the shootout; Kluivert hit the goal post on his penalty kick attempt while Frank de Boer's penalty kick and shootout kick saved were saved. In the other semi-final, Portugal lost in extra time to France after Zinedine Zidane converted a controversial penalty kick. Several Portuguese players challenged the awarding of the penalty for a handball and were given lengthy suspensions for verbally abusing and shoving the referee.

France won the tournament, defeating Italy 2–1 in the final with a golden goal by David Trezeguet after equalising with a last-minute goal, and became the first team to win the European championship while being world champion.

In Britain, Match of the Day named Stefano Fiore's goal against Belgium the Goal of the Tournament, ahead of Patrick Kluivert's against France and Zinedine Zidane's against Spain.

== Qualification ==
Qualification for the tournament took place throughout 1998 and 1999. Forty-nine teams were divided into nine groups and each played the others in their group, on a home-and-away basis. The winner of each group and the best runner-up qualified automatically for the final tournament. The eight other runners-up played an additional set of play-off matches to determine the last four qualifiers. Belgium and the Netherlands automatically qualified for the tournament as co-hosts. Notably, this was the only European Championship Belgium appeared in between 1984 and 2016.

As of 2024, this was the only time Norway qualified for the European Championship finals, the last time they qualified for a major tournament until the 2026 FIFA World Cup as well as the only time that Croatia failed to qualify for the European Championship finals since gaining independence. It also marks the last time Russia failed to qualify, being disqualified starting in 2024 due to the Russian invasion of Ukraine.

=== Qualified teams ===
Team	Qualified as	Qualified on	Previous appearances in tournament (Note: Bold indicates champion for that year. Italic indicates host for that year.)
Belgium	Co-host	14 July 1995	3 (1972, 1980, 1984)
Netherlands	Co-host	14 July 1995	5 (1976, 1980, **1988**, 1992, 1996)
Czech Republic (Note: From 1960 to 1980, the Czech Republic competed as Czechoslovakia.)	Group 9 winner	9 June 1999	4 (1960, **1976**, 1980, 1996)
Norway	Group 2 winner	8 September 1999	0 (debut)
Sweden	Group 5 winner	8 September 1999	1 (1992)
Spain	Group 6 winner	8 September 1999	5 (**1964**, 1980, 1984, 1988, 1996)
Italy	Group 1 winner	9 October 1999	4 (**1968**, 1980, 1988, 1996)
Germany (Note: From 1972 to 1988, Germany competed as West Germany.)	Group 3 winner	9 October 1999	7 (**1972**, 1976, **1980**, 1984, 1988, 1992, **1996**)
France	Group 4 winner	9 October 1999	4 (1960, **1984**, 1992, 1996)
Romania	Group 7 winner	9 October 1999	2 (1984, 1996)
FR Yugoslavia (Note: From 1960 to 1984, FR Yugoslavia competed as Yugoslavia.)	Group 8 winner	9 October 1999	4 (1960, 1968, 1976, 1984)
Portugal	Best runner-up	9 October 1999	2 (1984, 1996)
Denmark	Play-off winner	17 November 1999	5 (1964, 1984, 1988, **1992**, 1996)
England	Play-off winner	17 November 1999	5 (1968, 1980, 1988, 1992, 1996)
Slovenia	Play-off winner	17 November 1999	0 (debut)
Turkey	Play-off winner	17 November 1999	1 (1996)

=== Final draw ===
The finals draw took place 15:00 CET on 12 December 1999, at the Brussels Expo in Belgium; and was streamed live on UEFA's official website.

The composition of pots 1 to 4 was based on the teams' UEFA national team coefficient ranking at the end of 1999, with the exception of pot 1 automatically top seeding Germany as holders along with co-hosts Belgium and Netherlands.

Pot 1
Team	Coeff	Rank
Germany (holders) (Note: Defending champions Germany (coefficient 2.278; rank 7th) were automatically assigned to position A1.)	2.278	7
Belgium (co-hosts) (Note: Co-hosts Belgium (coefficient 2.375; rank 5th) were automatically assigned to position B1.)	2.375	5
Netherlands (co-hosts) (Note: Co-hosts Netherlands (coefficient 2.250; rank 8th) were automatically assigned to position D1.)	2.250	8
Spain (Note: Highest ranked Spain (coefficient 2.611; rank 1st) were automatically assigned to position C1.)	2.611	1

Pot 2
Team	Coeff	Rank
Romania	2.600	2
Norway	2.500	3
Sweden	2.389	4
Czech Republic	2.300	6

Pot 3
Team	Coeff	Rank
FR Yugoslavia	2.222	9
Portugal	2.100	11
France	2.100	12
Italy	2.063	13

Pot 4
Team	Coeff	Rank
England	2.000	15
Turkey	1.938	18
Denmark	1.938	19
Slovenia	1.000	37

Automatically selected as a top-seeded team into pot 1, irrespectively of their ranking position.

Prior to the draw, the seeded teams in Pot 1 were assigned positions: Germany (defending champion) to A1, Belgium (co-host) to B1, Spain (highest coefficient) to C1, and the Netherlands (co-host) to D1. Teams were drawn consecutively from Pots 2 to 4 into a group, with each team then being assigned a specific position (for the purposes of determining the match schedules in each group).

The draw resulted in the following groups:

Group A Team Germany Romania Portugal England	Group B Team Belgium Sweden Turkey Italy	Group C Team Spain Norway FR Yugoslavia Slovenia	Group D Team Netherlands Czech Republic France Denmark

== Venues ==
Capacity figures are those for matches at UEFA Euro 2000 and are not necessarily the total capacity that the stadium is capable of holding.

Belgium		Netherlands	
Brussels	Bruges	Amsterdam	Rotterdam
King Baudouin Stadium	Jan Breydel Stadium	Amsterdam Arena	Feijenoord Stadion
Capacity: 50,000	Capacity: 30,000	Capacity: 52,000	Capacity: 51,000
UEFA Euro 2000 is located in Belgium		UEFA Euro 2000 is located in Netherlands	
Liège	Charleroi	Eindhoven	Arnhem
Stade Maurice Dufrasne	Stade du Pays de Charleroi	Philips Stadion	GelreDome
Capacity: 30,000	Capacity: 30,000	Capacity: 33,000	Capacity: 30,000

=== Team base camps ===
The 16 national teams each stayed in their own "team base camp" during the tournament.

Team	Base camp	Ref.
Belgium	Lichtaart	
Czech Republic	Knokke-Heist	
Denmark	Brunssum	
England	Spa/Waterloo	
FR Yugoslavia	Edegem	
France	Genval	
Germany	Vaals	
Italy	Grobbendonk	
Netherlands	Hoenderloo	
Norway	Knokke-Heist	
Portugal	Ermelo	
Romania	Grimbergen/Arnhem	
Slovenia	Soestduinen	
Spain	Tegelen	
Sweden	Oisterwijk	
Turkey	Delden	

== Squads ==
Each national team had to submit a squad of 22 players, three of whom had to be goalkeepers.

== Match officials ==
On 15 February 2000, UEFA appointed 12 referees, 16 assistant referees and four fourth officials for the competition, including a referee and an assistant referee from the Confederation of African Football. The event saw assistant referees being allowed to intervene an ongoing game, in particular to help the match official apply the 10-metre rule when deciding free-kicks – as well as warn the referee instantly if he had booked or ejected the wrong player, something that was not possible in previous tournaments. Also, fourth officials were given a larger role in assisting to take command of the match if any decisions are gone unnoticed by the referee or an assistant referee.

The German referee Markus Merk was selected to referee the opening game between Belgium and Sweden.

Referees	Assistant referees	Fourth officials
(Austria) Günter Benkö	(Belarus) Yuri Dupanov	(Belgium) Michel Piraux
(Denmark) Kim Milton Nielsen	(Belgium) Roland Van Nylen	(Greece) Kyros Vassaras
(Egypt) Gamal Al-Ghandour	(Bulgaria) Ivan Lekov	(Norway) Terje Hauge
(England) Graham Poll	(Denmark) Jens Larsen	(Slovakia) Ľuboš Micheľ
(France) Gilles Veissière	(England) Philip Sharp	
(Germany) Markus Merk	(France) Jacques Poudevigne	
(Italy) Pierluigi Collina	(Germany) Kurt Ertl	
(Netherlands) Dick Jol	(Italy) Sergio Zuccolini	
(Portugal) Vítor Melo Pereira	(Mali) Dramane Dante	
(Scotland) Hugh Dallas	(Malta) Emanuel Zammit	
(Spain) José María García-Aranda	(Netherlands) Jaap Pool	
(Sweden) Anders Frisk	(Republic of Ireland) Eddie Foley	
(Switzerland) Urs Meier	(Romania) Nicolae Grigorescu	
	(Slovakia) Igor Šramka	
	(Spain) Carlos Martín Nieto	
	(Sweden) Leif Lindberg	
	(Turkey) Turgay Güdü	

== Group stage ==
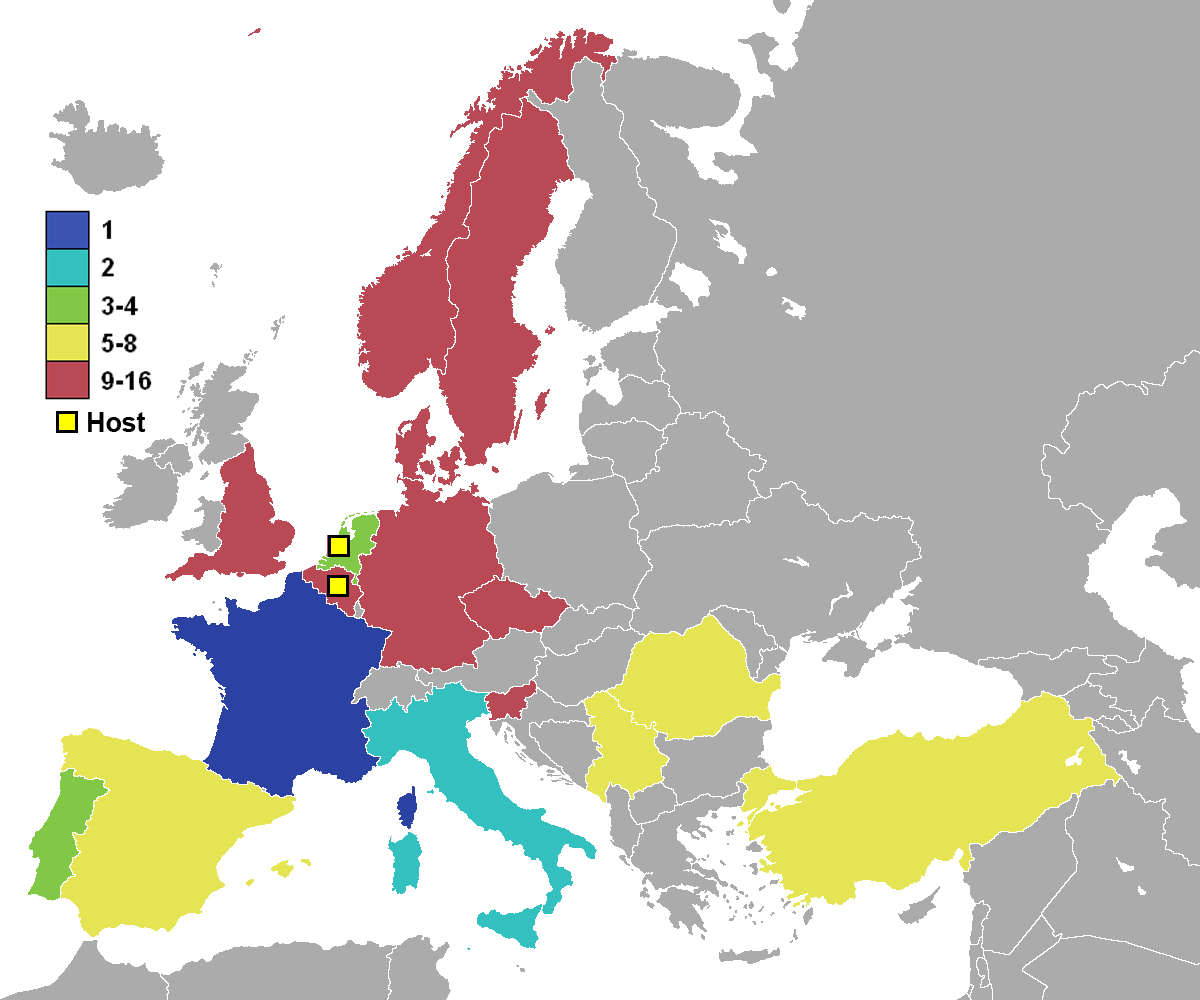
UEFA Euro 2000 finalists and their results

The teams finishing in the top two positions in each of the four groups progress to the quarter-finals, while the bottom two teams in each group were eliminated.

All times are local, CEST (UTC+2).

=== Tiebreakers ===
If two or more teams finished level on points after completion of the group matches, the following tie-breakers were used to determine the final ranking:

1. greater number of points in the matches between the teams in question;
2. greater goal difference in matches between the teams in question;
3. greater number of goals scored in matches between the teams in question;
4. greater goal difference in all group games;
5. greater number of goals scored in all group games;
6. higher coefficient derived from Euro 2000 and 1998 World Cup qualifiers (points obtained divided by number of matches played);
7. fair play conduct in Euro 2000;
8. drawing of lots.

=== Group A ===
Pos	Team	Pld	W	D	L	GF	GA	GD	Pts	Qualification
1	Portugal	3	3	0	0	7	2	+5	9	Advance to knockout stage
2	Romania	3	1	1	1	4	4	0	4	Advance to knockout stage
3	England	3	1	0	2	5	6	−1	3	
4	Germany	3	0	1	2	1	5	−4	1	

Source: UEFA
12 June 2000
18:00

Germany	1–1	Romania
Scholl 28'	Report	Moldovan 5'

Stade Maurice Dufrasne, Liège
Attendance: 28,500
Referee: Kim Milton Nielsen (Denmark)
12 June 2000
20:45

Portugal	3–2	England
Figo 22'; João Pinto 37'; Nuno Gomes 59'	Report	Scholes 3'; McManaman 18'

Philips Stadion, Eindhoven
Attendance: 31,500
Referee: Anders Frisk (Sweden)

17 June 2000
18:00

Romania	0–1	Portugal
	Report	Costinha 90+4'

GelreDome, Arnhem
Attendance: 28,400
Referee: Gilles Veissière (France)
17 June 2000
20:45

England	1–0	Germany
Shearer 53'	Report

Stade du Pays de Charleroi, Charleroi
Attendance: 29,000
Referee: Pierluigi Collina (Italy)

20 June 2000
20:45

England	2–3	Romania
Shearer 41' (pen.); Owen 45'	Report	Chivu 22'; Munteanu 48'; Ganea 89' (pen.)

Stade du Pays de Charleroi, Charleroi
Attendance: 30,000
Referee: Urs Meier (Switzerland)
20 June 2000
20:45

Portugal	3–0	Germany
Conceição 35', 54', 71'	Report

Feijenoord Stadion, Rotterdam
Attendance: 44,000
Referee: Dick Jol (Netherlands)

=== Group B ===
Pos	Team	Pld	W	D	L	GF	GA	GD	Pts	Qualification
1	Italy	3	3	0	0	6	2	+4	9	Advance to knockout stage
2	Turkey	3	1	1	1	3	2	+1	4	Advance to knockout stage
3	Belgium (H)	3	1	0	2	2	5	−3	3	
4	Sweden	3	0	1	2	2	4	−2	1	

Source: UEFA
(H) Hosts
10 June 2000
20:45

Belgium	2–1	Sweden
Goor 43'; É. Mpenza 46'	Report	Mjällby 53'

King Baudouin Stadium, Brussels
Attendance: 46,700
Referee: Markus Merk (Germany)
11 June 2000
14:30

Turkey	1–2	Italy
Okan 62'	Report	Conte 52'; Inzaghi 70' (pen.)

GelreDome, Arnhem
Attendance: 22,500
Referee: Hugh Dallas (Scotland)

14 June 2000
20:45

Italy	2–0	Belgium
Totti 6'; Fiore 66'	Report

King Baudouin Stadium, Brussels
Attendance: 44,500
Referee: José María García-Aranda (Spain)
15 June 2000
20:45

Sweden	0–0	Turkey
	Report

Philips Stadion, Eindhoven
Attendance: 27,000
Referee: Dick Jol (Netherlands)

19 June 2000
20:45

Turkey	2–0	Belgium
Şükür 45+2', 70'	Report

King Baudouin Stadium, Brussels
Attendance: 48,000
Referee: Kim Milton Nielsen (Denmark) (Note: Nielsen suffered an injury in the 39th minute and was replaced by fourth official Günter Benkö (Austria).)
19 June 2000
20:45

Italy	2–1	Sweden
Di Biagio 39'; Del Piero 88'	Report	Larsson 77'

Philips Stadion, Eindhoven
Attendance: 30,000
Referee: Vítor Melo Pereira (Portugal)

=== Group C ===
Pos	Team	Pld	W	D	L	GF	GA	GD	Pts	Qualification
1	Spain	3	2	0	1	6	5	+1	6	Advance to knockout stage
2	FR Yugoslavia	3	1	1	1	7	7	0	4 (Note: Head-to-head result: Norway 0–1 FR Yugoslavia.)	Advance to knockout stage
3	Norway	3	1	1	1	1	1	0	4	
4	Slovenia	3	0	2	1	4	5	−1	2	

Source: UEFA
Notes:
13 June 2000
18:00

Spain	0–1	Norway
	Report	Iversen 65'

Feijenoord Stadion, Rotterdam
Attendance: 41,000
Referee: Gamal Al-Ghandour (Egypt)
13 June 2000
20:45

FR Yugoslavia	3–3	Slovenia
Milošević 67', 73'; Drulović 70'	Report	Zahovič 23', 57'; Pavlin 52'

Stade du Pays de Charleroi, Charleroi
Attendance: 18,500
Referee: Vítor Melo Pereira (Portugal)

18 June 2000
18:00

Slovenia	1–2	Spain
Zahovič 59'	Report	Raúl 4'; Etxeberria 60'

Amsterdam Arena, Amsterdam
Attendance: 51,300
Referee: Markus Merk (Germany)
18 June 2000
20:45

Norway	0–1	FR Yugoslavia
	Report	Milošević 8'

Stade Maurice Dufrasne, Liège
Attendance: 28,750
Referee: Hugh Dallas (Scotland)

21 June 2000
18:00

FR Yugoslavia	3–4	Spain
Milošević 30'; Govedarica 50'; Komljenović 75'	Report	Alfonso 38', 90+5'; Munitis 51'; Mendieta 90+4' (pen.)

Jan Breydel Stadium, Bruges
Attendance: 26,611
Referee: Gilles Veissière (France)
21 June 2000
18:00

Slovenia	0–0	Norway
	Report

GelreDome, Arnhem
Attendance: 21,000
Referee: Graham Poll (England)

=== Group D ===
Pos	Team	Pld	W	D	L	GF	GA	GD	Pts	Qualification
1	Netherlands (H)	3	3	0	0	7	2	+5	9	Advance to knockout stage
2	France	3	2	0	1	7	4	+3	6	Advance to knockout stage
3	Czech Republic	3	1	0	2	3	3	0	3	
4	Denmark	3	0	0	3	0	8	−8	0	

Source: UEFA
(H) Hosts
11 June 2000
18:00

France	3–0	Denmark
Blanc 16'; Henry 64'; Wiltord 90+2'	Report

Jan Breydel Stadium, Bruges
Attendance: 28,100
Referee: Günter Benkö (Austria)
11 June 2000
20:45

Netherlands	1–0	Czech Republic
F. de Boer 89' (pen.)	Report

Amsterdam Arena, Amsterdam
Attendance: 50,800
Referee: Pierluigi Collina (Italy)

16 June 2000
18:00

Czech Republic	1–2	France
Poborský 35' (pen.)	Report	Henry 7'; Djorkaeff 60'

Jan Breydel Stadium, Bruges
Attendance: 27,243
Referee: Graham Poll (England)
16 June 2000
20:45

Denmark	0–3	Netherlands
	Report	Kluivert 57'; R. de Boer 66'; Zenden 77'

Feijenoord Stadion, Rotterdam
Attendance: 51,425
Referee: Urs Meier (Switzerland)

21 June 2000
20:45

Denmark	0–2	Czech Republic
	Report	Šmicer 64', 67'

Stade Maurice Dufrasne, Liège
Attendance: 20,000
Referee: Gamal Al-Ghandour (Egypt)
21 June 2000
20:45

France	2–3	Netherlands
Dugarry 8'; Trezeguet 31'	Report	Kluivert 14'; F. de Boer 51'; Zenden 59'

Amsterdam Arena, Amsterdam
Attendance: 50,000
Referee: Anders Frisk (Sweden)

== Knockout stage ==
The knockout stage was a single-elimination tournament with each round eliminating the losers. Any game that was undecided by the end of the regular 90 minutes, was followed by up to thirty minutes of extra time. For the second time the golden goal system was applied, whereby the first team to score during the extra time would become the winner. If no goal was scored there would be a penalty shoot-out to determine the winner. For the second time the final was won by a golden goal.

As with every tournament since UEFA Euro 1984, there was no third place play-off.

All times are local, CEST (UTC+2).

=== Bracket ===
Quarter-finals
25 June – Bruges
Spain	1
France	2
24 June – Amsterdam
Turkey	0
Portugal	2
24 June – Brussels
Italy	2
Romania	0
25 June – Rotterdam
Netherlands	6
FR Yugoslavia	1

Semi-finals
28 June – Brussels
France (g.g.)	2
Portugal	1
29 June – Amsterdam
Italy (p)	0 (3)
Netherlands	0 (1)

Final
2 July – Rotterdam
France (g.g.)	2
Italy	1

=== Quarter-finals ===
24 June 2000
18:00

Portugal	2–0	Turkey
Nuno Gomes 44', 56'	Report

Amsterdam Arena, Amsterdam
Attendance: 42,000
Referee: Dick Jol (Netherlands)

24 June 2000
20:45

Italy	2–0	Romania
Totti 33'; Inzaghi 43'	Report

King Baudouin Stadium, Brussels
Attendance: 41,000
Referee: Vítor Melo Pereira (Portugal)

25 June 2000
18:00

Netherlands	6–1	FR Yugoslavia
Kluivert 24', 38', 54'; Govedarica 51' (o.g.); Overmars 78', 90+1'	Report	Milošević 90+2'

Feijenoord Stadion, Rotterdam
Attendance: 44,000
Referee: José María García-Aranda (Spain)

25 June 2000
20:45

Spain	1–2	France
Mendieta 38' (pen.)	Report	Zidane 32'; Djorkaeff 44'

Jan Breydel Stadium, Bruges
Attendance: 26,614
Referee: Pierluigi Collina (Italy)

=== Semi-finals ===
28 June 2000
20:45

France	2–1 (a.e.t./g.g.)	Portugal
Henry 51'; Zidane 117' (pen.)	Report	Nuno Gomes 19'

King Baudouin Stadium, Brussels
Attendance: 48,000
Referee: Günter Benkö (Austria)

29 June 2000
18:00

Italy	0–0 (a.e.t.)	Netherlands
	Report
Penalties
Di Biagio (penalty scored); Pessotto (penalty scored); Totti (penalty scored); Maldini (penalty missed)	3–1	(penalty missed) F. de Boer; (penalty missed) Stam; (penalty scored) Kluivert; (penalty missed) Bosvelt

Amsterdam Arena, Amsterdam
Attendance: 50,000
Referee: Markus Merk (Germany)

=== Final ===
2 July 2000
20:00

France	2–1 (a.e.t./g.g.)	Italy
Wiltord 90+4'; Trezeguet 103'	Report	Delvecchio 55'

De Kuip, Rotterdam
Attendance: 48,100
Referee: Anders Frisk (Sweden)

== Statistics ==
=== Goalscorers ===
There were 85 goals scored in 31 matches, for an average of 2.74 goals per match.

5 goals

- (Federal Republic of Yugoslavia) Savo Milošević
- (Netherlands) Patrick Kluivert

4 goals

- (Portugal) Nuno Gomes

3 goals

- (France) Thierry Henry
- (Portugal) Sérgio Conceição
- (Slovenia) Zlatko Zahovič

2 goals

- (Czech Republic) Vladimír Šmicer
- (England) Alan Shearer
- (France) Youri Djorkaeff
- (France) David Trezeguet
- (France) Sylvain Wiltord
- (France) Zinedine Zidane
- (Italy) Filippo Inzaghi
- (Italy) Francesco Totti
- (Netherlands) Frank de Boer
- (Netherlands) Marc Overmars
- (Netherlands) Boudewijn Zenden
- (Spain) Alfonso
- (Spain) Gaizka Mendieta
- (Turkey) Hakan Şükür

1 goal

- (Belgium) Bart Goor
- (Belgium) Émile Mpenza
- (Czech Republic) Karel Poborský
- (England) Steve McManaman
- (England) Michael Owen
- (England) Paul Scholes
- (Federal Republic of Yugoslavia) Ljubinko Drulović
- (Federal Republic of Yugoslavia) Dejan Govedarica
- (Federal Republic of Yugoslavia) Slobodan Komljenović
- (France) Laurent Blanc
- (France) Christophe Dugarry
- (Germany) Mehmet Scholl
- (Italy) Antonio Conte
- (Italy) Alessandro Del Piero
- (Italy) Marco Delvecchio
- (Italy) Luigi Di Biagio
- (Italy) Stefano Fiore
- (Netherlands) Ronald de Boer
- (Norway) Steffen Iversen
- (Portugal) Costinha
- (Portugal) Luís Figo
- (Portugal) João Pinto
- (Romania) Cristian Chivu
- (Romania) Ionel Ganea
- (Romania) Viorel Moldovan
- (Romania) Dorinel Munteanu
- (Slovenia) Miran Pavlin
- (Spain) Joseba Etxeberria
- (Spain) Pedro Munitis
- (Spain) Raúl
- (Sweden) Henrik Larsson
- (Sweden) Johan Mjällby
- (Turkey) Okan Buruk

1 own goal

- (Federal Republic of Yugoslavia) Dejan Govedarica (against Netherlands)

Source: UEFA

=== Discipline ===
Player	Offence(s)	Suspension(s)
(Sweden) Patrik Andersson	(yellow card) (yellow-red card) in Group B vs Belgium (matchday 1; 10 June)	Group B vs Turkey (matchday 2; 15 June)
(Czech Republic) Radoslav Látal	(red card) in Group D vs Netherlands (matchday 1; 11 June)	Group D vs France (matchday 2; 16 June)
(Federal Republic of Yugoslavia) Siniša Mihajlović	(yellow card) (yellow-red card) in Group C vs Slovenia (matchday 1; 13 June)	Group C vs Norway (matchday 2; 18 June)
(Netherlands) Giovanni van Bronckhorst	(yellow card) in Group D vs Czech Republic (matchday 1; 11 June); (yellow card) in Group D vs Denmark (matchday 2; 16 June)	Group D vs France (matchday 3; 21 June)
(Romania) Gheorghe Hagi	(yellow card) in Group A vs Germany (matchday 1; 12 June); (yellow card) in Group A vs Portugal (matchday 2; 17 June)	Group A vs England (matchday 3; 20 June)
(Slovenia) Darko Milanič	(yellow card) in Group C vs FR Yugoslavia (matchday 1; 13 June); (yellow card) in Group C vs Spain (matchday 2; 18 June)	Group C vs Norway (matchday 3; 21 June)
(Federal Republic of Yugoslavia) Mateja Kežman	(red card) in Group C vs Norway (matchday 2; 18 June)	Group C vs Spain (matchday 3; 21 June)
(Belgium) Filip De Wilde	(red card) in Group B vs Turkey (matchday 3; 19 June)	Suspension served outside tournament
(Romania) Dan Petrescu	(yellow card) in Group A vs Portugal (matchday 2; 17 June); (yellow card) in Group A vs England (matchday 3; 20 June)	Quarter-finals vs Italy (24 June)
(Romania) Cosmin Contra	(yellow card) in Group A vs Portugal (matchday 2; 17 June); (yellow card) in Group A vs England (matchday 3; 20 June)	Quarter-finals vs Italy (24 June)
(Romania) Adrian Ilie	(yellow card) in Group A vs Germany (matchday 1; 12 June); (yellow card) in Group A vs England (matchday 3; 20 June)	Quarter-finals vs Italy (24 June)
(Federal Republic of Yugoslavia) Slaviša Jokanović	(red card) in Group C vs Spain (matchday 3; 21 June)	Quarter-finals vs Netherlands (25 June)
(Turkey) Alpay Özalan	(red card) in Quarter-finals vs Portugal (24 June)	Suspension served outside tournament
(Romania) Gheorghe Hagi	(yellow card) (yellow-red card) in Quarter-finals vs Italy (24 June)	Suspension served outside tournament
(Portugal) Nuno Gomes	(red card) in Semi-finals vs France (28 June)	Suspension served outside tournament
(Italy) Gianluca Zambrotta	(yellow card) (yellow-red card) in Semi-finals vs Netherlands (29 June)	Final vs France (2 July)

=== UEFA Team of the Tournament ===
UEFA's Technical Study Group selected a 22-man Team of the Tournament for UEFA Euro 2000, with Zinedine Zidane named Player of the Tournament.

Goalkeepers	Defenders	Midfielders	Forwards
(France) Fabien Barthez (Italy) Francesco Toldo	(France) Laurent Blanc (France) Marcel Desailly (France) Lilian Thuram (Italy) Fabio Cannavaro (Italy) Paolo Maldini (Italy) Alessandro Nesta (Netherlands) Frank de Boer	(France) Patrick Vieira (France) Zinedine Zidane (Italy) Demetrio Albertini (Netherlands) Edgar Davids (Portugal) Rui Costa (Portugal) Luís Figo (Spain) Pep Guardiola	(Federal Republic of Yugoslavia) Savo Milošević (France) Thierry Henry (Italy) Francesco Totti (Netherlands) Patrick Kluivert (Portugal) Nuno Gomes (Spain) Raúl

Golden Boot

- (Netherlands) Patrick Kluivert (5 goals)
- (Federal Republic of Yugoslavia) Savo Milošević (5 goals)

UEFA Player of the Tournament

- (France) Zinedine Zidane

=== Prize money ===
Prize money
Rank	Team	CHFMillion
1	France	14.4
2	Italy	13.2
3	Netherlands; Portugal	10.2
5	Romania; Spain; Turkey; FR Yugoslavia	7.8
9	Belgium; Czech Republic; England; Norway	5.4
13	Denmark; Germany; Slovenia; Sweden	4.8

A sum of CHF120 million was awarded to the 16 qualified teams in the competition. France, the winners of the tournament, received a total prize money of CHF14.4 million. Below is a complete list of the allocations:

Extra payment based on teams performances:

- Winner: CHF14.4 million
- Runner-up: CHF13.2 million
- Semi-finals: CHF10.2 million
- Quarter-finals: CHF7.8 million
- Group stage:
  - Third place: CHF5.4 million
  - Fourth place: CHF4.8 million

On 9 July 2000, UEFA refused to hand FR Yugoslavia their prize money of CHF7.8 million, because of alleged ties between the Football Association of FR Yugoslavia and Slobodan Milošević's government. However, no connections were found and the Football Association of FR Yugoslavia later received their money with an additional bonus.

== Marketing ==
=== Slogan and theme song ===
The slogan of the competition was "Football without frontiers". "Campione 2000" by E-Type was the official anthem of the event.

=== Match ball ===
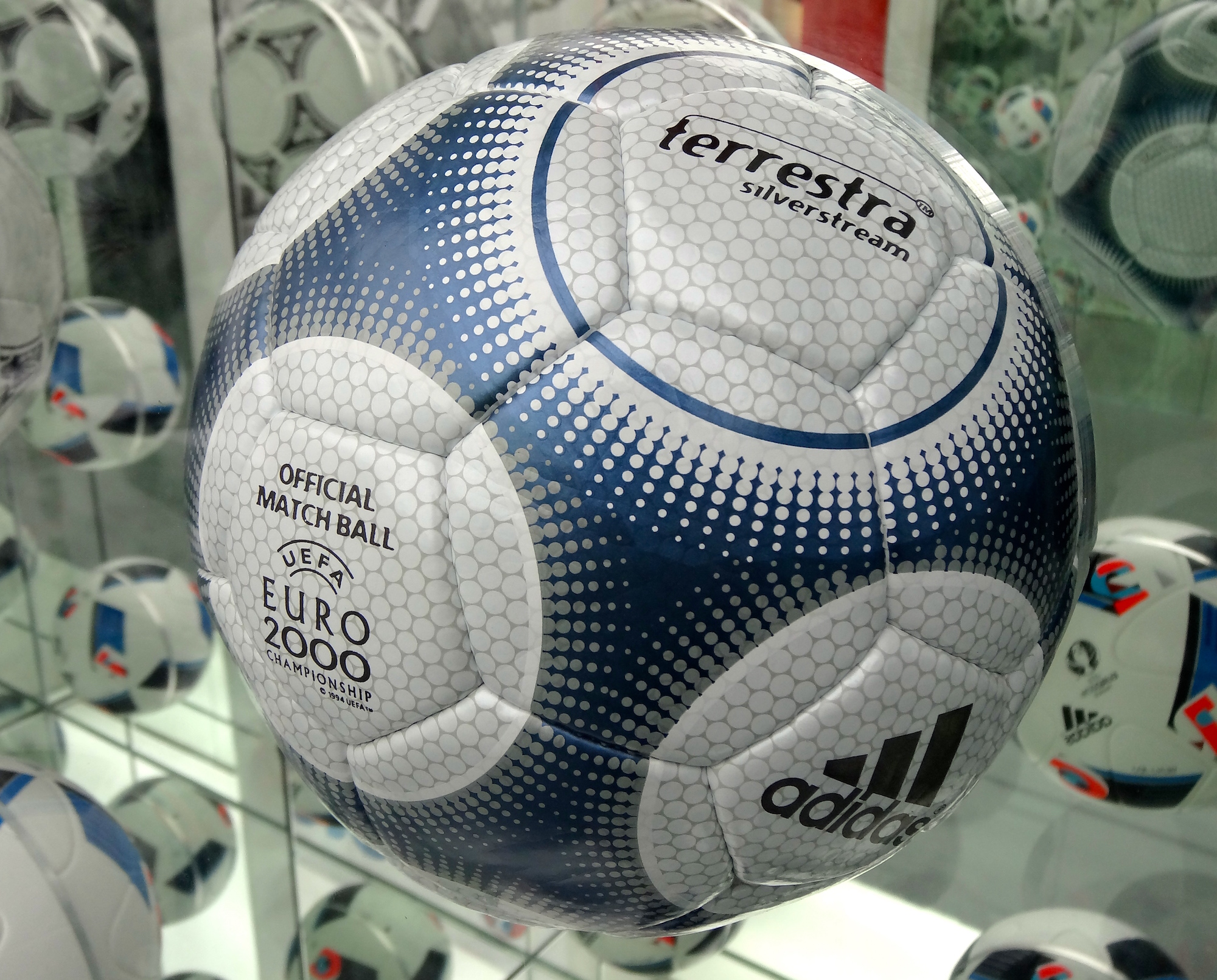
The Adidas Terrestra Silverstream, the match ball used at the tournament.

The Adidas Terrestra Silverstream was unveiled as the official match ball of the competition on 13 December 1999 at Constant Vanden Stock Stadium, Anderlecht's home arena by Alessandro Del Piero, Edwin van der Sar, Zinedine Zidane and Luc Nilis. It was the first ball developed specially for the Euros, without reusing the match ball from the most recent FIFA World Cup.

=== Mascot ===
Benelucky, the Euro 2000 mascot

The official mascot for the tournament was Benelucky (a pun on Benelux), a lion-devil hybrid with its mane having the flag colours of both host nations. The lion is the national football emblem of the Netherlands and a devil is the emblem of Belgium (the team being nicknamed "the Red Devils").

=== Sponsorships ===
Official Sponsors	Official Suppliers
Carlsberg; Coca-Cola; Fujifilm; Hyundai; JVC; Mastercard; McDonald's; Philips; PlayStation; Pringles; PSINet; Sportal	Adecco; Adidas; Cisco Systems; Connexxion; KLM; Lever Fabergé; Nestlé Cereals; Telfort; TotalFina
