= Brazil at the 2002 FIFA World Cup =

Matches of the Brazil national football team in the 2002 FIFA World Cup

At the 2002 FIFA World Cup, Brazil participated for the 17th time in the event. The country remained as the only national team to have participated in every installment of the FIFA World Cup. They are the only team to win all seven matches they played, achieving the highest number of matches won by a team in a single tournament in the history of the FIFA World Cup. Brazil reached the final where they defeated Germany 2–0.

== Squad ==
Head coach: Luiz Felipe Scolari

No.	Pos.	Player	Date of birth (age)	Caps	Club
1	GK	Marcos	4 August 1973 (aged 28)	15	(Brazil) Palmeiras
2	DF	Cafu (c)	7 June 1970 (aged 31)	103	(Italy) Roma
3	DF	Lúcio	8 May 1978 (aged 24)	15	(Germany) Bayer Leverkusen
4	DF	Roque Júnior	31 August 1976 (aged 25)	17	(Italy) Milan
5	DF	Edmílson	10 July 1976 (aged 25)	12	(France) Lyon
6	DF	Roberto Carlos	10 April 1973 (aged 29)	84	(Spain) Real Madrid
7	MF	Ricardinho	23 May 1976 (aged 26)	3	(Brazil) Corinthians
8	MF	Gilberto Silva	7 October 1976 (aged 25)	6	(Brazil) Atlético Mineiro
9	FW	Ronaldo	22 September 1976 (aged 25)	56	(Italy) Inter Milan
10	MF	Rivaldo	19 April 1972 (aged 30)	58	(Spain) Barcelona
11	MF	Ronaldinho	21 March 1980 (aged 22)	24	(France) Paris Saint-Germain
12	GK	Dida	7 October 1973 (aged 28)	49	(Brazil) Corinthians
13	DF	Juliano Belletti	20 June 1976 (aged 25)	10	(Brazil) São Paulo
14	DF	Ânderson Polga	9 February 1979 (aged 23)	5	(Brazil) Grêmio
15	MF	Kléberson	19 June 1979 (aged 22)	5	(Brazil) Atlético Paranaense
16	DF	Júnior	20 June 1973 (aged 28)	12	(Italy) Parma
17	FW	Denílson	24 August 1977 (aged 24)	53	(Spain) Real Betis
18	MF	Vampeta	13 March 1974 (aged 28)	36	(Brazil) Corinthians
19	MF	Juninho	22 February 1973 (aged 29)	43	(England) Middlesbrough
20	FW	Edílson	17 September 1971 (aged 30)	17	(Brazil) Cruzeiro
21	FW	Luizão	14 November 1975 (aged 26)	8	(Brazil) Grêmio
22	GK	Rogério Ceni	22 January 1973 (aged 29)	12	(Brazil) São Paulo
23	MF	Kaká	22 April 1982 (aged 20)	2	(Brazil) São Paulo

== Brazil vs Turkey ==
3 June 2002
18:00

Brazil	2-1	Turkey
Ronaldo 50'; Rivaldo 87' (pen.)	report	Şaş 45+2'

Munsu Cup Stadium, Ulsan
Attendance: 33,842
Referee: Kim Young-joo (Korea Republic)

Brazil	Turkey

GK	1	Marcos
CB	4	Roque Júnior
CB	3	Lúcio
CB	5	Edmílson
RWB	2	Cafu (c)
LWB	6	Roberto Carlos
CM	8	Gilberto Silva
CM	19	Juninho		(substituted off) 72'
RF	11	Ronaldinho		(substituted off) 67'
CF	9	Ronaldo		(substituted off) 73'
LF	10	Rivaldo
Substitutions:
FW	17	Denílson	(yellow card) 73'	(substituted on) 67'
MF	18	Vampeta		(substituted on) 72'
FW	21	Luizão		(substituted on) 73'
Manager:
Luiz Felipe Scolari

GK	1	Rüştü Reçber
CB	5	Alpay Özalan	(yellow card) 44' (red card) 86'
CB	16	Ümit Özat
CB	3	Bülent Korkmaz		(substituted off) 66'
RM	4	Fatih Akyel	(yellow card) 21'
CM	8	Tugay Kerimoğlu		(substituted off) 88'
LM	20	Hakan Ünsal	(yellow card) 24' (yellow-red card) 90+4'
RW	21	Emre Belözoğlu
AM	10	Yıldıray Baştürk		(substituted off) 66'
LW	11	Hasan Şaş
CF	9	Hakan Şükür (c)
Substitutions:
FW	17	İlhan Mansız		(substituted on) 66'
MF	22	Ümit Davala		(substituted on) 66'
FW	6	Arif Erdem		(substituted on) 88'
Manager:
Şenol Güneş

Man of the Match:
Rivaldo (Brazil)

Assistant referees:
Visva Krishnan (Singapore)
Vladimir Fernández (El Salvador)
Fourth official:
Vítor Melo Pereira (Portugal)

== Brazil vs China PR ==
8 June 2002
20:30

Brazil	4-0	China
Roberto Carlos 15'; Rivaldo 32'; Ronaldinho 45' (pen.); Ronaldo 55'	Report

Jeju World Cup Stadium, Seogwipo
Attendance: 36,750
Referee: Anders Frisk (Sweden)

Brazil	China PR

GK	1	Marcos
CB	3	Lúcio
CB	14	Ânderson Polga
CB	4	Roque Júnior	(yellow card) 69'
RWB	2	Cafu (c)
LWB	6	Roberto Carlos
CM	19	Juninho		(substituted off) 70'
CM	8	Gilberto Silva
RF	10	Rivaldo
CF	9	Ronaldo		(substituted off) 72'
LF	11	Ronaldinho	(yellow card) 25'	(substituted off) 46'
Substitutions:
FW	17	Denílson		(substituted on) 46'
MF	7	Ricardinho		(substituted on) 70'
FW	20	Edílson		(substituted on) 72'
Manager:
Luiz Felipe Scolari

GK	22	Jiang Jin
RB	21	Xu Yunlong
CB	17	Du Wei
CB	14	Li Weifeng
LB	4	Wu Chengying
CM	8	Li Tie
CM	15	Zhao Junzhe
RM	18	Li Xiaopeng
LM	9	Ma Mingyu (c)	(substituted off) 62'
AM	19	Qi Hong	(substituted off) 66'
CF	10	Hao Haidong	(substituted off) 75'
Substitutions:
MF	3	Yang Pu	(substituted on) 62'
MF	6	Shao Jiayi	(substituted on) 66'
FW	16	Qu Bo	(substituted on) 75'
Manager:
(Federal Republic of Yugoslavia) Bora Milutinović

Man of the Match:
Roberto Carlos (Brazil)

Assistant referees:
Leif Lindberg (Sweden)
Bomer Fierro (Ecuador)
Fourth official:
Ali Bujsaim (United Arab Emirates)

== Costa Rica vs Brazil ==
13 June 2002
15:30

Costa Rica	2–5	Brazil
Wanchope 39'; Gómez 56'	Report	Ronaldo 10', 13'; Edmílson 38'; Rivaldo 62'; Júnior 64'

Suwon World Cup Stadium, Suwon
Attendance: 38,524
Referee: Gamal Al-Ghandour (Egypt)

Costa Rica	Brazil

GK	1	Erick Lonnis (c)
CB	5	Gilberto Martínez	(substituted off) 74'
CB	4	Mauricio Wright
CB	3	Luis Marín
RM	15	Harold Wallace	(substituted off) 46'
CM	8	Mauricio Solís	(substituted off) 65'
CM	6	Wilmer López
CM	10	Walter Centeno
LM	22	Carlos Castro
CF	9	Paulo Wanchope
CF	11	Rónald Gómez
Substitutions:
FW	16	Steven Bryce	(substituted on) 46'
FW	7	Rolando Fonseca	(substituted on) 65'
MF	12	Winston Parks	(substituted on) 74'
Manager:
Alexandre Guimarães

GK	1	Marcos
CB	3	Lúcio
CB	14	Ânderson Polga
CB	5	Edmílson
RWB	2	Cafu (c)	(yellow card) 90+3'
LWB	16	Júnior
CM	19	Juninho		(substituted off) 61'
CM	8	Gilberto Silva
RF	20	Edílson		(substituted off) 57'
CF	9	Ronaldo
LF	10	Rivaldo		(substituted off) 72'
Substitutions:
MF	15	Kléberson		(substituted on) 57'
MF	7	Ricardinho		(substituted on) 61'
FW	23	Kaká		(substituted on) 72'
Manager:
Luiz Felipe Scolari

Man of the Match:
Júnior (Brazil)

Assistant referees:
Wagih Farag (Egypt)
Egon Bereuter (Austria)
Fourth official:
Ľuboš Micheľ (Slovakia)

== Brazil vs Belgium ==
17 June 2002
20:30

Brazil	2-0	Belgium
Rivaldo 67'; Ronaldo 87'	Report

Kobe Wing Stadium, Kobe
Attendance: 40,440
Referee: Peter Prendergast (Jamaica)

Brazil	Belgium

GK	1	Marcos
CB	3	Lúcio
CB	4	Roque Júnior
CB	5	Edmílson
RWB	2	Cafu (c)
LWB	6	Roberto Carlos	(yellow card) 28'
CM	19	Juninho		(substituted off) 57'
CM	8	Gilberto Silva
AM	11	Ronaldinho		(substituted off) 81'
AM	10	Rivaldo		(substituted off) 90'
CF	9	Ronaldo
Substitutions:
MF	17	Denílson		(substituted on) 57'
MF	15	Kléberson		(substituted on) 81'
MF	7	Ricardinho		(substituted on) 90'
Manager:
Luiz Felipe Scolari

GK	1	Geert De Vlieger
RB	15	Jacky Peeters		(substituted off) 72'
CB	16	Daniel Van Buyten
CB	6	Timmy Simons
LB	5	Nico Van Kerckhoven
RM	22	Mbo Mpenza
CM	18	Yves Vanderhaeghe	(yellow card) 24'
CM	10	Johan Walem
LM	8	Bart Goor
CF	11	Gert Verheyen
CF	7	Marc Wilmots (c)
Substitutions:
FW	9	Wesley Sonck		(substituted on) 72'
Manager:
Robert Waseige

Man of the Match:
Rivaldo (Brazil)

Assistant referees:
Yuri Dupanov (Belarus)
Mohamed Saeed (Maldives)
Fourth official:
Toru Kamikawa (Japan)

== Brazil vs England ==
21 June 2002
15:30

England	1–2	Brazil
Owen 23'	Report	Rivaldo 45+2'; Ronaldinho 50'

Stadium Ecopa, Shizuoka
Attendance: 47,436
Referee: Felipe Ramos (Mexico)

England	Brazil

GK	1	David Seaman
RB	2	Danny Mills
CB	5	Rio Ferdinand	(yellow card) 86'
CB	6	Sol Campbell
LB	3	Ashley Cole		(substituted off) 80'
RM	7	David Beckham (c)
CM	21	Nicky Butt
CM	8	Paul Scholes	(yellow card) 75'
LM	4	Trevor Sinclair		(substituted off) 56'
CF	10	Michael Owen		(substituted off) 79'
CF	11	Emile Heskey
Substitutions:
MF	23	Kieron Dyer		(substituted on) 56'
FW	20	Darius Vassell		(substituted on) 79'
FW	17	Teddy Sheringham		(substituted on) 80'
Manager:
(Sweden) Sven-Göran Eriksson

GK	1	Marcos
CB	3	Lúcio
CB	5	Edmílson
CB	4	Roque Júnior
RWB	2	Cafu (c)
LWB	6	Roberto Carlos
CM	15	Kléberson
CM	8	Gilberto Silva
AM	11	Ronaldinho	(red card) 57'
AM	10	Rivaldo
CF	9	Ronaldo		(substituted off) 70'
Substitutions:
FW	20	Edílson		(substituted on) 70'
Manager:
Luiz Felipe Scolari

Man of the Match:
Rivaldo (Brazil)

Assistant referees:
Héctor Vergara (Canada)
Mohamed Saeed (Maldives)
Fourth official:
Ali Bujsaim (United Arab Emirates)

== Brazil vs Turkey ==
26 June 2002
20:30

Brazil	1–0	Turkey
Ronaldo 49'	Report

Saitama Stadium, Saitama
Attendance: 61,058
Referee: Kim Milton Nielsen (Denmark)

Brazil	Turkey

GK	1	Marcos
CB	3	Lúcio
CB	4	Roque Júnior
CB	5	Edmílson
RM	2	Cafu (c)
CM	15	Kléberson		(substituted off) 85'
CM	8	Gilberto Silva	(yellow card) 41'
LM	6	Roberto Carlos
RF	20	Edílson		(substituted off) 75'
CF	9	Ronaldo		(substituted off) 68'
LF	10	Rivaldo
Substitutions:
FW	21	Luizão		(substituted on) 68'
MF	17	Denílson		(substituted on) 75'
DF	13	Juliano Belletti		(substituted on) 85'
Manager:
Luiz Felipe Scolari

GK	1	Rüştü Reçber
RB	4	Fatih Akyel
CB	5	Alpay Özalan
CB	3	Bülent Korkmaz
LB	18	Ergün Penbe
DM	8	Tugay Kerimoğlu	(yellow card) 59'
RM	22	Ümit Davala		(substituted off) 74'
CM	10	Yıldıray Baştürk		(substituted off) 88'
LM	21	Emre Belözoğlu		(substituted off) 62'
CF	11	Hasan Şaş	(yellow card) 90'
CF	9	Hakan Şükür (c)
Substitutions:
FW	17	İlhan Mansız		(substituted on) 62'
MF	13	Muzzy Izzet		(substituted on) 74'
FW	6	Arif Erdem		(substituted on) 88'
Manager:
Şenol Güneş

Man of the Match:
Ronaldo (Brazil)

Assistant referees:
Maciej Wierzbowski (Poland)
Igor Šramka (Slovakia)
Fourth official:
Brian Hall (United States)

== Final ==
30 June 2002
20:00

Germany	0–2	Brazil
	Report	Ronaldo 67', 79'

International Stadium Yokohama
Attendance: 69,029
Referee: Pierluigi Collina (Italy)

Germany	Brazil

GK	1	Oliver Kahn (c)
CB	2	Thomas Linke
CB	5	Carsten Ramelow
CB	21	Christoph Metzelder
RM	22	Torsten Frings
CM	8	Dietmar Hamann
CM	16	Jens Jeremies		(substituted off) 77'
LM	17	Marco Bode		(substituted off) 84'
AM	19	Bernd Schneider
CF	11	Miroslav Klose	(yellow card) 9'	(substituted off) 74'
CF	7	Oliver Neuville
Substitutes:
FW	20	Oliver Bierhoff		(substituted on) 74'
FW	14	Gerald Asamoah		(substituted on) 77'
DF	6	Christian Ziege		(substituted on) 84'
Manager:
Rudi Völler

GK	1	Marcos
CB	3	Lúcio
CB	5	Edmílson
CB	4	Roque Júnior	(yellow card) 6'
RM	2	Cafu (c)
CM	8	Gilberto Silva
CM	15	Kléberson
LM	6	Roberto Carlos
AM	11	Ronaldinho		(substituted off) 85'
CF	10	Rivaldo
CF	9	Ronaldo		(substituted off) 90'
Substitutes:
MF	19	Juninho		(substituted on) 85'
MF	17	Denílson		(substituted on) 90'
Manager:
Luiz Felipe Scolari

Man of the Match:
Ronaldo (Brazil)

Assistant referees:
Leif Lindberg (Sweden)
Philip Sharp (England)
Fourth official:
Hugh Dallas (Scotland)
