= Turkey at the FIFA World Cup =

International football delegation

This is a record of Turkey's results at the FIFA World Cup. Turkey has qualified for the tournament on three occasions, most recently in 2026. Their highest-place finish was in 2002, where they finished third.

== Overall record ==
FIFA World Cup record									FIFA World Cup qualification record					
Year	Round	Position	Pld	W	D*	L	GF	GA	Pld	W	D	L	GF	GA
(Uruguay) 1930	Did not enter								Did not enter					
(Italy) 1934	Withdrew								Withdrew					
(France) 1938	Did not enter								Did not enter					
(Brazil) 1950	Qualified but withdrew								1	1	0	0	7	0
(Switzerland) 1954	Group stage	9th	3	1	0	2	10	11	3	1	1	1	4	6
(Sweden) 1958	Withdrew								Withdrew					
(Chile) 1962	Did not qualify								4	2	0	2	4	4
(England) 1966	Did not qualify								6	1	0	5	4	19
(Mexico) 1970	Did not qualify								4	0	0	4	2	13
(West Germany) 1974	Did not qualify								6	2	2	2	5	3
(Argentina) 1978	Did not qualify								6	2	1	3	9	5
(Spain) 1982	Did not qualify								8	0	0	8	1	22
(Mexico) 1986	Did not qualify								8	0	1	7	2	24
(Italy) 1990	Did not qualify								8	3	1	4	12	10
(United States) 1994	Did not qualify								10	3	1	6	11	19
(France) 1998	Did not qualify								8	4	2	2	21	9
(South Korea) (Japan) 2002	Third place	3rd	7	4	1	2	10	6	12	8	3	1	24	8
(Germany) 2006	Did not qualify								14	7	5	2	27	13
(South Africa) 2010	Did not qualify								10	4	3	3	13	10
(Brazil) 2014	Did not qualify								10	5	1	4	16	9
(Russia) 2018	Did not qualify								10	4	3	3	14	13
(Qatar) 2022	Did not qualify								11	6	3	2	28	19
(Canada) (Mexico) (United States) 2026	Group stage	35th	3	1	0	2	3	5	8	6	1	1	19	12
(Morocco) (Portugal) (Spain) 2030	To be determined								To be determined					
(Saudi Arabia) 2034	To be determined								To be determined					
Total	Third place	3/23	13	6	1	6	23	22	146	59	28	60	223	218

*Draws include knockout matches decided via penalty shoot-out

=== By match ===
World Cup	Round	Opponent	Score	Result	Venue	Turkey scorers
(Switzerland) 1954	Group 2	West Germany	1–4	L	Bern	S. Mamat
(Switzerland) 1954	Group 2	South Korea	7–0	W	Geneva	B. Sargun (3), S. Mamat (2), L. Küçükandonyadis, E. Keskin
(Switzerland) 1954	Group 2	West Germany	2–7	L	Zürich	M. Ertan, L. Küçükandonyadis
(South Korea) (Japan) 2002	Group C	Brazil	1–2	L	Ulsan	H. Şaş
(South Korea) (Japan) 2002	Group C	Costa Rica	1–1	D	Incheon	E. Belözoğlu
(South Korea) (Japan) 2002	Group C	China	3–0	W	Seoul	H. Şaş, B. Korkmaz, Ü. Davala
(South Korea) (Japan) 2002	Round of 16	Japan	1–0	W	Rifu	Ü. Davala
(South Korea) (Japan) 2002	Quarter-finals	Senegal	1–0 (g.g.)	W	Osaka	İ. Mansız
(South Korea) (Japan) 2002	Semi-finals	Brazil	0–1	L	Saitama	—
(South Korea) (Japan) 2002	Match for third place	South Korea	3–2	W	Daegu	İ. Mansız (2), H. Şükür
(Canada) (Mexico) (United States) 2026	Group D	Australia	0–2	L	Vancouver	—
(Canada) (Mexico) (United States) 2026	Group D	Paraguay	0–1	L	Santa Clara	—
(Canada) (Mexico) (United States) 2026	Group D	United States	3–2	W	Inglewood	A. Güler, B. Yilmaz, K. Ayhan

=== Record by opponent ===
FIFA World Cup matches (by team)
Opponent	W	D	L	Pld	GF	GA
Australia	0	0	1	1	0	2
Brazil	0	0	2	2	1	3
China	1	0	0	1	3	0
Costa Rica	0	1	0	1	1	1
Japan	1	0	0	1	1	0
Paraguay	0	0	1	1	0	1
Senegal	1	0	0	1	1	0
South Korea	2	0	0	2	10	2
United States	1	0	0	1	3	2
West Germany	0	0	2	2	3	11

== Turkey at 1954 FIFA World Cup ==
Head coach: (Italy) Sandro Puppo

No.	Pos.	Player	Date of birth (age)	Caps	Club
1	GK	Turgay Şeren (captain)	15 May 1932 (aged 22)	11	(Turkey) Galatasaray S.K.
2	DF	Rıdvan Bolatlı	2 December 1928 (aged 25)	2	(Turkey) MKE Ankaragücü SK
3	DF	Basri Dirimlili	7 June 1929 (aged 25)	3	(Turkey) Fenerbahçe SK
4	DF	Mustafa Ertan	21 April 1926 (aged 28)	4	(Turkey) MKE Ankaragücü SK
5	MF	Çetin Zeybek	12 September 1932 (aged 21)	2	(Turkey) Kasımpaşa SK
6	MF	Rober Eryol	21 December 1930 (aged 23)	5	(Turkey) Galatasaray S.K.
7	FW	Erol Keskin	2 March 1927 (aged 27)	1	(Turkey) Adalet SK Istanbul
8	FW	Suat Mamat	8 November 1930 (aged 23)	2	(Turkey) Galatasaray S.K.
9	FW	Feridun Buğeker	5 April 1933 (aged 21)	3	(Turkey) Fenerbahçe SK
10	FW	Burhan Sargun	11 February 1929 (aged 25)	5	(Turkey) Fenerbahçe SK
11	FW	Lefter Küçükandonyadis	22 December 1925 (aged 28)	3	(Turkey) Fenerbahçe SK
12	GK	Şükrü Ersoy	14 January 1934 (aged 20)	3	(Turkey) Vefa SK
13	DF	Bülent Eken	26 January 1923 (aged 31)	11	(Turkey) Galatasaray S.K.
14	DF	Ali Beratlıgil	21 October 1931 (aged 22)	2	(Turkey) Galatasaray S.K.
15	MF	Mehmet Dinçer	20 February 1933 (aged 21)	0	(Turkey) Fenerbahçe SK
16	DF	Nedim Günar	2 January 1932 (aged 22)	0	(Turkey) Fenerbahçe SK
17	DF	Naci Erdem	28 January 1931 (aged 23)	0	(Turkey) Fenerbahçe SK
18	DF	Kaçmaz Akgün	19 February 1935 (aged 19)	1	(Turkey) MKE Ankaragücü SK
19	DF	Ahmet Berman	1 January 1932 (aged 22)	0	(Turkey) Beşiktaş J.K.
20	FW	Necmi Onarıcı	2 November 1925 (aged 28)	0	(Turkey) Adalet SK Istanbul
21	FW	Kadri Aytaç	6 August 1931 (aged 22)	0	(Turkey) Galatasaray S.K.
22	FW	Coşkun Taş	23 April 1935 (aged 19)	2	(Turkey) Beşiktaş J.K.

=== Group stage ===
Pos	Team	Pld	W	D	L	GF	GA	GD	Pts	Qualification
1	Hungary	2	2	0	0	17	3	+14	4	Advance to the knockout stage
2	West Germany	2	1	0	1	7	9	−2	2 (Note: Second place decided over through play-off: West Germany 7–2 Turkey.)	Advance to the knockout stage
3	Turkey	2	1	0	1	8	4	+4	2	
4	South Korea	2	0	0	2	0	16	−16	0	

Source: FIFA
Notes:
17 June 1954
18:00 (CET)

West Germany	4 – 1	Turkey
Schäfer 14'; Klodt 52'; O. Walter 60'; Morlock 84'	Report	Mamat 2'

Wankdorf Stadium, Bern
Attendance: 39,000
Referee: Jose da Costa Vieira (Portugal)

20 June 1954
17:00 (CET)

Turkey	7 – 0	South Korea
Mamat 10', 30'; Küçükandonyadis 24'; Sargun 37', 64', 70'; Keskin 76'	Report

Charmilles Stadium, Geneva
Attendance: 3,000
Referee: Esteban Marino (Uruguay)

=== Play-off ===
23 June 1954
18:00 (CET)

West Germany	7 – 2	Turkey
O. Walter 7'; Schäfer 12', 79'; Morlock 30', 60', 77'; F. Walter 62'	Report	Ertan 21'; Küçükandonyadis 82'

Hardturm Stadium, Zürich
Attendance: 18,000
Referee: Raymond Vincenti (France)

== Turkey at 2002 FIFA World Cup ==
Head coach: Şenol Güneş

No.	Pos.	Player	Date of birth (age)	Caps	Club
1	GK	Rüştü Reçber	10 May 1973 (aged 29)	64	(Turkey) Fenerbahçe
2	DF	Emre Aşık	13 December 1973 (aged 28)	16	(Turkey) Galatasaray
3	DF	Bülent Korkmaz	24 November 1968 (aged 33)	68	(Turkey) Galatasaray
4	DF	Fatih Akyel	26 December 1977 (aged 24)	36	(Turkey) Fenerbahçe
5	DF	Alpay Özalan	29 May 1973 (aged 29)	62	(England) Aston Villa
6	FW	Arif Erdem	2 January 1972 (aged 30)	50	(Turkey) Galatasaray
7	MF	Okan Buruk	19 October 1973 (aged 28)	26	(Italy) Inter
8	MF	Tugay Kerimoğlu	24 August 1970 (aged 31)	69	(England) Blackburn Rovers
9	FW	Hakan Şükür (c)	1 September 1971 (aged 30)	73	(Italy) Parma
10	MF	Yıldıray Baştürk	24 December 1978 (aged 23)	13	(Germany) Bayer 04 Leverkusen
11	FW	Hasan Şaş	1 August 1976 (aged 25)	14	(Turkey) Galatasaray
12	GK	Ömer Çatkıç	15 October 1974 (aged 27)	6	(Turkey) Gaziantepspor
13	MF	Mustafa İzzet	31 October 1974 (aged 27)	7	(England) Leicester City
14	MF	Tayfur Havutçu	23 April 1970 (aged 32)	39	(Turkey) Beşiktaş
15	FW	Nihat Kahveci	23 November 1979 (aged 22)	11	(Spain) Real Sociedad
16	DF	Ümit Özat	30 October 1976 (aged 25)	14	(Turkey) Fenerbahçe
17	FW	İlhan Mansız	10 August 1975 (aged 26)	6	(Turkey) Beşiktaş
18	MF	Ergün Penbe	17 May 1972 (aged 30)	21	(Turkey) Galatasaray
19	MF	Abdullah Ercan	8 December 1971 (aged 30)	70	(Turkey) Fenerbahçe
20	DF	Hakan Ünsal	14 May 1973 (aged 29)	25	(Turkey) Galatasaray
21	MF	Emre Belözoğlu	7 September 1980 (aged 21)	11	(Italy) Inter
22	MF	Ümit Davala	30 July 1973 (aged 28)	24	(Italy) A.C. Milan
23	GK	Zafer Özgültekin	10 March 1975 (aged 27)	1	(Turkey) Ankaragücü

Pos	Team	Pld	W	D	L	GF	GA	GD	Pts	Qualification
1	Brazil	3	3	0	0	11	3	+8	9	Advance to knockout stage
2	Turkey	3	1	1	1	5	3	+2	4	Advance to knockout stage
3	Costa Rica	3	1	1	1	5	6	−1	4	
4	China	3	0	0	3	0	9	−9	0	

Source: FIFA
Rules for classification: Tie-breaking criteria

=== Brazil vs Turkey ===
3 June 2002
18:00

Brazil	2–1	Turkey
Ronaldo 50'; Rivaldo 87' (pen.)	Report	Şaş 45+2'

Munsu Cup Stadium, Ulsan
Attendance: 33,842
Referee: Kim Young-joo (South Korea)

Brazil	Turkey

GK	1	Marcos
CB	4	Roque Júnior
CB	3	Lúcio
CB	5	Edmílson
RWB	2	Cafu (c)
LWB	6	Roberto Carlos
CM	8	Gilberto Silva
CM	19	Juninho Paulista		(substituted off) 72'
RF	11	Ronaldinho		(substituted off) 67'
CF	9	Ronaldo		(substituted off) 73'
LF	10	Rivaldo
Substitutions:
FW	17	Denílson	(yellow card) 73'	(substituted on) 67'
MF	18	Vampeta		(substituted on) 72'
FW	21	Luizão		(substituted on) 73'
Manager:
Luiz Felipe Scolari

GK	1	Rüştü Reçber
CB	5	Alpay Özalan	(yellow card) 44' (red card) 86'
CB	16	Ümit Özat
CB	3	Bülent Korkmaz		(substituted off) 66'
RM	4	Fatih Akyel	(yellow card) 21'
CM	8	Tugay Kerimoğlu		(substituted off) 88'
LM	20	Hakan Ünsal	(yellow card) 24' (yellow-red card) 90+4'
RW	21	Emre Belözoğlu
AM	10	Yıldıray Baştürk		(substituted off) 66'
LW	11	Hasan Şaş
CF	9	Hakan Şükür (c)
Substitutions:
FW	17	İlhan Mansız		(substituted on) 66'
MF	22	Ümit Davala		(substituted on) 66'
FW	6	Arif Erdem		(substituted on) 88'
Manager:
Şenol Güneş

Man of the Match:
Rivaldo (Brazil)

Assistant referees:
Visva Krishnan (Singapore)
Vladimir Fernández (El Salvador)
Fourth official:
Vítor Melo Pereira (Portugal)

=== Costa Rica vs Turkey ===
9 June 2002
18:00

Costa Rica	1–1	Turkey
Parks 86'	Report	Belözoğlu 56'

Incheon Munhak Stadium, Incheon
Attendance: 42,299
Referee: Coffi Codjia (Benin)

Costa Rica	Turkey

GK	1	Erick Lonnis (c)
CB	5	Gilberto Martínez	(yellow card) 24'
CB	4	Mauricio Wright
CB	3	Luis Marín
RM	15	Harold Wallace		(substituted off) 77'
CM	10	Walter Centeno		(substituted off) 66'
CM	8	Mauricio Solís
CM	6	Wilmer López		(substituted off) 77'
CM	11	Rónald Gómez
LM	22	Carlos Castro	(yellow card) 43'
CF	9	Paulo Wanchope
Substitutions:
FW	17	Hernán Medford		(substituted on) 66'
MF	12	Winston Parks		(substituted on) 77'
FW	16	Steven Bryce		(substituted on) 77'
Manager:
Alexandre Guimarães

GK	1	Rüştü Reçber
CB	16	Ümit Özat
CB	2	Emre Aşık	(yellow card) 20'
CB	18	Ergün Penbe
RM	4	Fatih Akyel
CM	8	Tugay Kerimoğlu	(yellow card) 45'	(substituted off) 88'
LM	21	Emre Belözoğlu	(yellow card) 89'
RW	22	Ümit Davala
AM	10	Yıldıray Baştürk		(substituted off) 79'
LW	11	Hasan Şaş
CF	9	Hakan Şükür (c)		(substituted off) 75'
Substitutions:
FW	17	İlhan Mansız		(substituted on) 75'
FW	15	Nihat Kahveci		(substituted on) 79'
FW	6	Arif Erdem		(substituted on) 88'
Manager:
Şenol Güneş

Man of the Match:
Paulo Wanchope (Costa Rica)

Assistant referees:
Dramane Danté (Mali)
Brighton Mudzamiri (Zimbabwe)
Fourth official:
Óscar Ruiz (Colombia)

=== Turkey vs China PR ===
13 June 2002
15:30

Turkey	3–0	China
Şaş 6'; Korkmaz 9'; Davala 85'	Report

Seoul World Cup Stadium, Seoul
Attendance: 43,605
Referee: Óscar Ruiz (Colombia)

Turkey	China PR

GK	1	Rüştü Reçber		(substituted off) 35'
CB	4	Fatih Akyel
CB	2	Emre Aşık	(yellow card) 19'
CB	3	Bülent Korkmaz
RM	22	Ümit Davala
CM	8	Tugay Kerimoğlu		(substituted off) 84'
LM	20	Hakan Ünsal
RW	10	Yıldıray Baştürk		(substituted off) 70'
AM	11	Hasan Şaş	(yellow card) 81'
LW	21	Emre Belözoğlu	(yellow card) 30'
CF	9	Hakan Şükür (c)
Substitutions:
GK	12	Ömer Çatkıç		(substituted on) 35'
FW	17	İlhan Mansız		(substituted on) 70'
MF	14	Tayfur Havutçu		(substituted on) 84'
Manager:
Şenol Güneş

GK	22	Jiang Jin (c)
RB	21	Xu Yunlong
CB	17	Du Wei
CB	14	Li Weifeng	(yellow card) 62'
LB	4	Wu Chengying		(substituted off) 46'
RM	18	Li Xiaopeng
CM	8	Li Tie
CM	15	Zhao Junzhe
LM	3	Yang Pu	(yellow card) 45+1'
CF	10	Hao Haidong		(substituted off) 73'
CF	20	Yang Chen		(substituted off) 73'
Substitutions:
MF	6	Shao Jiayi	(red card) 58'	(substituted on) 46'
MF	11	Yu Genwei		(substituted on) 73'
FW	16	Qu Bo		(substituted on) 73'
Manager:
(Federal Republic of Yugoslavia) Bora Milutinović

Man of the Match:
Hasan Şaş (Turkey)

Assistant referees:
Ali Tomusange (Uganda)
Curtis Charles (Antigua and Barbuda)
Fourth official:
Byron Moreno (Ecuador)

=== Second Round Japan vs Turkey ===
18 June 2002
15:30

Japan	0–1	Turkey
	Report	Davala 12'

Miyagi Stadium, Rifu
Attendance: 45,666
Referee: Pierluigi Collina (Italy)

Japan	Turkey

GK	12	Seigo Narazaki
CB	3	Naoki Matsuda
CB	17	Tsuneyasu Miyamoto (c)
CB	16	Kōji Nakata
RM	20	Tomokazu Myojin
CM	21	Kazuyuki Toda	(yellow card) 45'
CM	7	Hidetoshi Nakata
CM	5	Junichi Inamoto		(substituted off) 46'
LM	18	Shinji Ono
CF	9	Akinori Nishizawa
CF	14	Alex		(substituted off) 46'
Substitutions:
FW	11	Takayuki Suzuki		(substituted on) 46'
MF	22	Daisuke Ichikawa		(substituted on) 46'	(substituted off) 86'
MF	8	Hiroaki Morishima			(substituted on) 86'
Manager:
(France) Philippe Troussier

GK	1	Rüştü Reçber
RB	5	Alpay Özalan	(yellow card) 21'
CB	3	Bülent Korkmaz
LB	20	Hakan Ünsal
CM	4	Fatih Akyel
CM	8	Tugay Kerimoğlu
CM	18	Ergün Penbe	(yellow card) 44'
RW	22	Ümit Davala		(substituted off) 74'
AM	10	Yıldıray Baştürk		(substituted off) 90'
LW	11	Hasan Şaş		(substituted off) 85'
CF	9	Hakan Şükür (c)	(yellow card) 90'
Substitutions:
MF	15	Nihat Kahveci		(substituted on) 74'
FW	14	Tayfur Havutçu		(substituted on) 85'
FW	17	İlhan Mansız		(substituted on) 90'
Manager:
Şenol Güneş

Man of the Match:
Alpay Özalan (Turkey)

Assistant referees:
Maciej Wierzbowski (Poland)
Paul Smith (New Zealand)
Fourth official:
Graham Poll (England)

=== Quarter-Final Senegal vs Turkey ===
22 June 2002
20:30

Senegal	0–1 (a.e.t.)	Turkey
	Report	Mansız 94'

Nagai Stadium, Osaka
Attendance: 44,233
Referee: Óscar Ruiz (Colombia)

Senegal	Turkey

GK	1	Tony Sylva
RB	17	Ferdinand Coly
CB	13	Lamine Diatta
CB	4	Papa Malick Diop
LB	2	Omar Daf	(yellow card) 12'
CM	19	Papa Bouba Diop
CM	6	Aliou Cissé (c)	(yellow card) 63'
CM	15	Salif Diao
RF	7	Henri Camara
CF	11	El Hadji Diouf
LF	10	Khalilou Fadiga
Manager:
(France) Bruno Metsu

GK	1	Rüştü Reçber
RB	4	Fatih Akyel
CB	5	Alpay Özalan
CB	3	Bülent Korkmaz
LB	18	Ergün Penbe
RM	22	Ümit Davala
CM	8	Tugay Kerimoğlu
LM	21	Emre Belözoğlu	(yellow card) 22'	(substituted off) 91'
AM	10	Yıldıray Baştürk
AM	11	Hasan Şaş
CF	9	Hakan Şükür (c)		(substituted off) 67'
Substitutions:
FW	17	İlhan Mansız	(yellow card) 87'	(substituted on) 67'
FW	6	Arif Erdem		(substituted on) 91'
Manager:
Şenol Güneş

Man of the Match:
Hasan Şaş (Turkey)

Assistant referees:
Jorge Rattalino (Argentina)
Miguel Giacomuzzi (Paraguay)
Fourth official:
Gilles Veissière (France)

=== Semi-final Brazil vs Turkey ===
26 June 2002
20:30

Brazil	1–0	Turkey
Ronaldo 49'	Report

Saitama Stadium, Saitama
Attendance: 61,058
Referee: Kim Milton Nielsen (Denmark)

Brazil	Turkey

GK	1	Marcos
CB	3	Lúcio
CB	4	Roque Júnior
CB	5	Edmílson
RM	2	Cafu (c)
CM	15	Kléberson		(substituted off) 85'
CM	8	Gilberto Silva	(yellow card) 41'
LM	6	Roberto Carlos
RF	20	Edílson		(substituted off) 75'
CF	9	Ronaldo		(substituted off) 68'
LF	10	Rivaldo
Substitutions:
FW	21	Luizão		(substituted on) 68'
MF	17	Denílson		(substituted on) 75'
DF	13	Belletti		(substituted on) 85'
Manager:
Luiz Felipe Scolari

GK	1	Rüştü Reçber
RB	4	Fatih Akyel
CB	5	Alpay Özalan
CB	3	Bülent Korkmaz
LB	18	Ergün Penbe
DM	8	Tugay Kerimoğlu	(yellow card) 59'
RM	22	Ümit Davala		(substituted off) 74'
CM	10	Yıldıray Baştürk		(substituted off) 88'
LM	21	Emre Belözoğlu		(substituted off) 62'
CF	11	Hasan Şaş	(yellow card) 90'
CF	9	Hakan Şükür (c)
Substitutions:
FW	17	İlhan Mansız		(substituted on) 62'
MF	13	Muzzy Izzet		(substituted on) 74'
FW	6	Arif Erdem		(substituted on) 88'
Manager:
Şenol Güneş

Man of the Match:
Ronaldo (Brazil)

Assistant referees:
Maciej Wierzbowski (Poland)
Igor Šramka (Slovakia)
Fourth official:
Brian Hall (United States)

=== Match for third place ===
Hakan Şükür scored the fastest goal in World Cup finals history with a low left footed shot past the goalkeeper from the edge of the penalty box after 11 seconds.

29 June 2002
20:00

South Korea	2–3	Turkey
Lee Eul-yong 9'; Song Chong-gug 90+3'	Report	Şükür 1'; Mansız 13', 32'

Daegu World Cup Stadium, Daegu
Attendance: 63,483
Referee: Saad Mane (Kuwait)

South Korea	Turkey

GK	1	Lee Woon-jae
CB	6	Yoo Sang-chul
CB	20	Hong Myung-bo (c)		(substituted off) 46'
CB	15	Lee Min-sung
RM	22	Song Chong-gug
CM	21	Park Ji-sung
CM	10	Lee Young-pyo
LM	13	Lee Eul-yong	(yellow card) 23'	(substituted off) 65'
RF	9	Seol Ki-hyeon		(substituted off) 79'
CF	19	Ahn Jung-hwan
LF	14	Lee Chun-soo
Substitutions:
DF	7	Kim Tae-Young		(substituted on) 46'
FW	16	Cha Du-ri		(substituted on) 65'
MF	8	Choi Tae-uk		(substituted on) 79'
Manager:
(Netherlands) Guus Hiddink

GK	1	Rüştü Reçber	(yellow card) 83'
RB	4	Fatih Akyel
CB	5	Alpay Özalan
CB	3	Bülent Korkmaz
LB	18	Ergün Penbe
RM	22	Ümit Davala		(substituted off) 76'
CM	8	Tugay Kerimoğlu	(yellow card) 50'
CM	10	Yıldıray Baştürk		(substituted off) 86'
LM	21	Emre Belözoğlu		(substituted off) 41'
CF	9	Hakan Şükür (c)
CF	17	İlhan Mansız
Substitutions:
MF	20	Hakan Ünsal		(substituted on) 41'
MF	7	Okan Buruk		(substituted on) 76'
MF	14	Tayfur Havutçu		(substituted on) 86'
Manager:
Şenol Güneş

Man of the Match:
Hakan Şükür (Turkey)

Assistant referees:
Ali Al Traifi (Saudi Arabia)
Héctor Vergara (Canada)
Fourth official:
Felipe Ramos (Mexico)

== Turkey at 2026 FIFA World Cup ==
=== Group stage ===
Pos	Team	Pld	W	D	L	GF	GA	GD	Pts	Qualification
1	United States (H)	3	2	0	1	8	4	+4	6	Advance to knockout stage
2	Australia	3	1	1	1	2	2	0	4 (Note: Tied on head-to-head result (Paraguay 0–0 Australia). Overall goal difference was used as the tiebreaker.)	Advance to knockout stage
3	Paraguay	3	1	1	1	2	4	−2	4	Advance to knockout stage
4	Turkey	3	1	0	2	3	5	−2	3	

Source: FIFA
(H) Hosts
Notes:
June 13, 2026
9:00 p.m. UTC−7

Australia	2–0	Turkey
Irankunda 27'; Metcalfe 75'	(Note: "Australia vs Türkiye | First Stage | FIFA World Cup 2026". FIFA. Retrieved June 14, 2026.; "Match Report – Group D – Australia v. Türkiye". FIFA. June 13, 2026. Retrieved June 14, 2026.; "Post match summary report – Group D – Australia v. Türkiye". FIFA. June 14, 2026. Retrieved June 14, 2026.)

BC Place, Vancouver
Attendance: 52,497
Referee: Jesús Valenzuela (Venezuela)

June 19, 2026
8:00 p.m. UTC−7

Turkey	0–1	Paraguay
	(Note: "Türkiye vs Paraguay | First Stage | FIFA World Cup 2026". FIFA. Retrieved June 19, 2026.; "Match Report – Group D – Türkiye v. Paraguay". FIFA. June 19, 2026. Retrieved June 20, 2026.; "Post match summary report – Group D – Türkiye v. Paraguay". FIFA. June 19, 2026. Retrieved June 20, 2026.)	Galarza 2'

Levi's Stadium, Santa Clara
Attendance: 68,827
Referee: Iván Barton (El Salvador)

June 25, 2026
7:00 p.m. UTC−7

Turkey	3–2	United States
Güler 10'; Yılmaz 31'; Ayhan 90+8'	(Note: "Türkiye vs USA | First Stage | FIFA World Cup 2026". FIFA. Retrieved June 26, 2026.; "Match Report – Group D – Türkiye v. USA". FIFA. June 26, 2026. Retrieved June 26, 2026.; "Post match summary report – Group D – Türkiye v. USA". FIFA. June 26, 2026. Retrieved June 27, 2026.)	Trusty 3'; Berhalter 49'

SoFi Stadium, Inglewood
Attendance: 70,492
Referee: Mustapha Ghorbal (Algeria)

== Player records ==
=== Most appearances ===
Seven players were fielded in all seven matches of Turkey's third-place run in 2002. Of those seven, only Fatih Akyel played every minute of the tournament.

Rank	Player	Matches	World Cups
1	Fatih Akyel	7	2002
1	Hakan Şükür	7	2002
1	İlhan Mansız	7	2002
1	Rüştü Reçber	7	2002
1	Tugay Kerimoğlu	7	2002
1	Ümit Davala	7	2002
1	Yıldıray Baştürk	7	2002
8	Bülent Korkmaz	6	2002
8	Emre Belözoğlu	6	2002
8	Hasan Şaş	6	2002

=== Goalscorers ===
Player	Goals	1954	2002	2026
Suat Mamat	3	3		
Burhan Sargun	3	3		
İlhan Mansız	3		3	
Lefter Küçükandonyadis	2	2		
Hasan Şaş	2		2	
Ümit Davala	2		2	
Mustafa Ertan	1	1		
Erol Keskin	1	1		
Emre Belözoğlu	1		1	
Bülent Korkmaz	1		1	
Hakan Şükür	1		1	
Kaan Ayhan	1			1
Arda Güler	1			1
Barış Alper Yılmaz	1			1
Total	23	10	10	3

== See also ==
- Turkey at the FIFA Confederations Cup
- Turkey at the UEFA European Championship
