= UEFA Euro 2000 Group B =

Football tournament group stage

Group B of UEFA Euro 2000 began on 10 June and ended on 19 June 2000. Italy won the group ahead of Turkey. Belgium and Sweden were eliminated.

== Teams ==
Draw position	Team	Pot	Method of qualification	Date of qualification	Finals appearance	Last appearance	Previous best performance	UEFA Rankings November 1999 (Note: The UEFA rankings of November 1999 were used for seeding for the final draw.)	FIFA Rankings June 2000
B1	Belgium	1	Co-host	14 July 1995	4th	1984	Runners-up (1980)	8	30
B2	Sweden	2	Group 5 winner	8 September 1999	2nd	1992	Semi-finals (1992)	4	16
B3	Turkey	4	Play-off winner	17 November 1999	2nd	1996	Group stage (1996)	18	35
B4	Italy	3	Group 1 winner	9 October 1999	5th	1996	Winners (1968)	13	14

== Standings ==
Pos	Team	Pld	W	D	L	GF	GA	GD	Pts	Qualification
1	Italy	3	3	0	0	6	2	+4	9	Advance to knockout stage
2	Turkey	3	1	1	1	3	2	+1	4	Advance to knockout stage
3	Belgium (H)	3	1	0	2	2	5	−3	3	
4	Sweden	3	0	1	2	2	4	−2	1	

Source: UEFA
Rules for classification: Group stage tiebreakers
(H) Hosts

In the quarter-finals,

- The winner of Group B, Italy, advanced to play the runner-up of Group A, Romania.
- The runner-up of Group B, Turkey, advanced to play the winner of Group A, Portugal.

== Matches ==
=== Belgium vs Sweden ===
10 June 2000
20:45

Belgium	2–1	Sweden
Goor 43'; É. Mpenza 46'	Report	Mjällby 53'

King Baudouin Stadium, Brussels
Attendance: 46,700
Referee: Markus Merk (Germany)

Belgium	Sweden

GK	1	Filip De Wilde
SW	4	Lorenzo Staelens (c)
RB	2	Éric Deflandre
CB	3	Joos Valgaeren
LB	17	Philippe Léonard		(substituted off) 72'
DM	6	Yves Vanderhaeghe
RM	11	Gert Verheyen	(yellow card) 65'	(substituted off) 88'
LM	8	Bart Goor
AM	7	Marc Wilmots
CF	9	Émile Mpenza
CF	10	Branko Strupar		(substituted off) 69'
Substitutions:
FW	16	Luc Nilis	(yellow card) 77'	(substituted on) 69'
DF	18	Nico Van Kerckhoven	(yellow card) 90'	(substituted on) 72'
DF	15	Jacky Peeters		(substituted on) 88'
Manager:
Robert Waseige

GK	1	Magnus Hedman
RB	2	Roland Nilsson		(substituted off) 46'
CB	3	Patrik Andersson (c)	(yellow card) 45' (yellow-red card) 81'
CB	4	Joachim Björklund
LB	14	Olof Mellberg
DM	17	Johan Mjällby
RM	11	Niclas Alexandersson
CM	15	Daniel Andersson		(substituted off) 70'
LM	9	Freddie Ljungberg
CF	19	Kennet Andersson
CF	10	Jörgen Pettersson		(substituted off) 50'
Substitutions:
DF	5	Teddy Lučić		(substituted on) 46'
FW	20	Henrik Larsson		(substituted on) 50'
FW	18	Yksel Osmanovski		(substituted on) 70'
Managers:
Lars Lagerbäck; Tommy Söderberg

Man of the Match:
Émile Mpenza (Belgium)

Assistant referees:
Kurt Ertl (Germany)
Philip Sharp (England)
Fourth official:
Ľuboš Micheľ (Slovakia)

=== Turkey vs Italy ===
11 June 2000
14:30

Turkey	1–2	Italy
Okan 62'	Report	Conte 52'; Inzaghi 70' (pen.)

GelreDome, Arnhem
Attendance: 22,500
Referee: Hugh Dallas (Scotland)

Turkey	Italy

GK	1	Rüştü Reçber
CB	3	Ogün Temizkanoğlu (c)
CB	4	Fatih Akyel
CB	5	Alpay Özalan
DM	2	Tayfur Havutçu
RM	22	Ümit Davala	(substituted off) 76'
CM	7	Okan Buruk	(substituted off) 88'
CM	11	Tayfun Korkut
LM	19	Abdullah Ercan
AM	10	Sergen Yalçın	(substituted off) 81'
CF	9	Hakan Şükür
Substitutions:
MF	8	Tugay Kerimoğlu	(substituted on) 76'
FW	6	Arif Erdem	(substituted on) 81'
MF	16	Ergün Penbe	(substituted on) 88'
Manager:
Mustafa Denizli

GK	12	Francesco Toldo
CB	5	Fabio Cannavaro
CB	13	Alessandro Nesta
CB	3	Paolo Maldini (c)
RWB	17	Gianluca Zambrotta
LWB	11	Gianluca Pessotto	(substituted off) 62'
CM	4	Demetrio Albertini
CM	8	Antonio Conte
AM	18	Stefano Fiore	(substituted off) 75'
CF	20	Francesco Totti	(substituted off) 83'
CF	9	Filippo Inzaghi
Substitutions:
DF	15	Mark Iuliano	(substituted on) 62'
FW	10	Alessandro Del Piero	(substituted on) 75'
MF	7	Angelo Di Livio	(substituted on) 83'
Manager:
Dino Zoff

Man of the Match:
Filippo Inzaghi (Italy)

Assistant referees:
Eddie Foley (Republic of Ireland)
Igor Šramka (Slovakia)
Fourth official:
Terje Hauge (Norway)

=== Italy vs Belgium ===
14 June 2000
20:45

Italy	2–0	Belgium
Totti 6'; Fiore 66'	Report

King Baudouin Stadium, Brussels
Attendance: 44,500
Referee: José María García-Aranda (Spain)

Italy	Belgium

GK	12	Francesco Toldo
CB	5	Fabio Cannavaro
CB	13	Alessandro Nesta
CB	15	Mark Iuliano
RWB	17	Gianluca Zambrotta	(yellow card) 47'
LWB	3	Paolo Maldini (c)
CM	4	Demetrio Albertini
CM	8	Antonio Conte	(yellow card) 44'
AM	18	Stefano Fiore		(substituted off) 83'
CF	20	Francesco Totti		(substituted off) 63'
CF	9	Filippo Inzaghi		(substituted off) 77'
Substitutions:
FW	10	Alessandro Del Piero		(substituted on) 63'
FW	21	Marco Delvecchio		(substituted on) 77'
MF	16	Massimo Ambrosini		(substituted on) 83'
Manager:
Dino Zoff

GK	1	Filip De Wilde
SW	4	Lorenzo Staelens (c)
RB	2	Éric Deflandre
CB	3	Joos Valgaeren
LB	18	Nico Van Kerckhoven		(substituted off) 46'
DM	6	Yves Vanderhaeghe
RM	11	Gert Verheyen		(substituted off) 67'
LM	8	Bart Goor
AM	7	Marc Wilmots	(yellow card) 70'
CF	9	Émile Mpenza
CF	10	Branko Strupar		(substituted off) 58'
Substitutions:
MF	22	Marc Hendrikx		(substituted on) 46'
FW	16	Luc Nilis		(substituted on) 58'
FW	21	Mbo Mpenza		(substituted on) 67'
Manager:
Robert Waseige

Man of the Match:
Francesco Totti (Italy)

Assistant referees:
Carlos Martín Nieto (Spain)
Ivan Lekov (Bulgaria)
Fourth official:
Kyros Vassaras (Greece)

=== Sweden vs Turkey ===
15 June 2000
20:45

Sweden	0–0	Turkey
	Report

Philips Stadion, Eindhoven
Attendance: 27,000
Referee: Dick Jol (Netherlands)

Sweden	Turkey

GK	1	Magnus Hedman
RB	6	Gary Sundgren
CB	4	Joachim Björklund
CB	14	Olof Mellberg
LB	5	Teddy Lučić
DM	17	Johan Mjällby (c)	(yellow card) 68'
RM	11	Niclas Alexandersson		(substituted off) 63'
CM	9	Freddie Ljungberg
LM	7	Håkan Mild
CF	19	Kennet Andersson		(substituted off) 46'
CF	20	Henrik Larsson		(substituted off) 78'
Substitutions:
FW	10	Jörgen Pettersson		(substituted on) 46'
MF	16	Anders Andersson		(substituted on) 63'
MF	13	Magnus Svensson		(substituted on) 78'
Managers:
Lars Lagerbäck; Tommy Söderberg

GK	1	Rüştü Reçber
RB	22	Ümit Davala		(substituted off) 45'
CB	3	Ogün Temizkanoğlu (c)		(substituted off) 59'
CB	4	Fatih Akyel
CB	5	Alpay Özalan
LB	20	Hakan Ünsal
DM	14	Suat Kaya	(yellow card) 5'
RM	7	Okan Buruk
LM	15	Mustafa Izzet		(substituted off) 58'
CF	6	Arif Erdem
CF	9	Hakan Şükür
Substitutions:
MF	11	Tayfun Korkut		(substituted on) 45'
MF	10	Sergen Yalçın		(substituted on) 58'
MF	8	Tugay Kerimoğlu		(substituted on) 59'
Manager:
Mustafa Denizli

Man of the Match:
Freddie Ljungberg (Sweden)

Assistant referees:
Jaap Pool (Netherlands)
Emanuel Zammit (Malta)
Fourth official:
Terje Hauge (Norway)

=== Turkey vs Belgium ===
19 June 2000
20:45

Turkey	2–0	Belgium
Şükür 45+2', 70'	Report

King Baudouin Stadium, Brussels
Attendance: 48,000
Referee: Kim Milton Nielsen (Denmark) (Note: Nielsen suffered an injury in the 39th minute and was replaced by fourth official Günter Benkö (Austria).)

Turkey	Belgium

GK	1	Rüştü Reçber
RB	5	Alpay Özalan
CB	3	Ogün Temizkanoğlu (c)
LB	4	Fatih Akyel
DM	14	Suat Kaya
RM	11	Tayfun Korkut	(yellow card) 50'
LM	19	Abdullah Ercan
AM	7	Okan Buruk		(substituted off) 77'
AM	8	Tugay Kerimoğlu		(substituted off) 37'
CF	6	Arif Erdem		(substituted off) 87'
CF	9	Hakan Şükür
Substitutions:
MF	2	Tayfur Havutçu		(substituted on) 37'
MF	16	Ergün Penbe		(substituted on) 77'
DF	13	Osman Özköylü	(yellow card) 88'	(substituted on) 87'
Manager:
Mustafa Denizli

GK	1	Filip De Wilde	(red card) 84'
SW	4	Lorenzo Staelens (c)
RB	2	Éric Deflandre
CB	3	Joos Valgaeren
LB	18	Nico Van Kerckhoven
DM	6	Yves Vanderhaeghe	(yellow card) 44'
RM	11	Gert Verheyen		(substituted off) 63'
LM	8	Bart Goor		(substituted off) 59'
AM	7	Marc Wilmots
CF	9	Émile Mpenza	(yellow card) 63'
CF	16	Luc Nilis		(substituted off) 79'
Substitutions:
MF	22	Marc Hendrikx		(substituted on) 59'
FW	10	Branko Strupar		(substituted on) 63'
FW	20	Gilles De Bilde		(substituted on) 79'
Manager:
Robert Waseige

Man of the Match:
Hakan Şükür (Turkey)

Assistant referees:
Jens Larsen (Denmark)
Nicolae Grigorescu (Romania)
Fourth official:
Günter Benkö (Austria)

=== Italy vs Sweden ===
19 June 2000
20:45

Italy	2–1	Sweden
Di Biagio 39'; Del Piero 88'	Report	Larsson 77'

Philips Stadion, Eindhoven
Attendance: 30,000
Referee: Vítor Melo Pereira (Portugal)

Italy	Sweden

GK	12	Francesco Toldo
CB	2	Ciro Ferrara
CB	6	Paolo Negro
CB	15	Mark Iuliano	(substituted off) 46'
RWB	11	Gianluca Pessotto
LWB	3	Paolo Maldini (c)	(substituted off) 42'
CM	7	Angelo Di Livio	(substituted off) 64'
CM	14	Luigi Di Biagio
CM	16	Massimo Ambrosini
CF	10	Alessandro Del Piero
CF	19	Vincenzo Montella
Substitutions:
DF	13	Alessandro Nesta	(substituted on) 42'
DF	5	Fabio Cannavaro	(substituted on) 46'
MF	18	Stefano Fiore	(substituted on) 64'
Manager:
Dino Zoff

GK	1	Magnus Hedman
RB	14	Olof Mellberg
CB	3	Patrik Andersson (c)
CB	4	Joachim Björklund
LB	8	Tomas Gustafsson	(substituted off) 75'
DM	17	Johan Mjällby	(substituted off) 56'
RM	13	Magnus Svensson	(substituted off) 52'
LM	7	Håkan Mild
AM	9	Freddie Ljungberg
CF	18	Yksel Osmanovski
CF	20	Henrik Larsson
Substitutions:
MF	11	Niclas Alexandersson	(substituted on) 52'
MF	15	Daniel Andersson	(substituted on) 56'
FW	19	Kennet Andersson	(substituted on) 75'
Managers:
Lars Lagerbäck; Tommy Söderberg

Man of the Match:
Henrik Larsson (Sweden)

Assistant referees:
Jacques Poudevigne (France)
Dramane Dante (Mali)
Fourth official:
Gilles Veissière (France)

== See also ==
- Belgium at the UEFA European Championship
- Italy at the UEFA European Championship
- Sweden at the UEFA European Championship
- Turkey at the UEFA European Championship
