= 2002 FIFA World Cup Group C =

Football tournament group stage

Group C of the 2002 FIFA World Cup took place between 3 and 13 June 2002. The group consisted of eventual champions Brazil, Turkey, Costa Rica, and China. Brazil finished top of the group, winning all three matches, and advanced to the second round, alongside Turkey, and then the two teams went on to meet each other in the semi-finals. Costa Rica were eliminated on goal difference, having shared the same number of points as Turkey, while China lost all three of their matches without scoring a goal in any of them, thus making the only team to not score in this World Cup alongside France and Saudi Arabia.

== Standings ==
Pos	Team	Pld	W	D	L	GF	GA	GD	Pts	Qualification
1	Brazil	3	3	0	0	11	3	+8	9	Advance to knockout stage
2	Turkey	3	1	1	1	5	3	+2	4	Advance to knockout stage
3	Costa Rica	3	1	1	1	5	6	−1	4	
4	China	3	0	0	3	0	9	−9	0	

Source: FIFA
Rules for classification: Tie-breaking criteria
- Brazil advanced to play Belgium (runner-up of Group H) in the round of 16.
- Turkey advanced to play Japan (winner of Group H) in the round of 16.

== Matches ==
All times are local (UTC+9)

=== Brazil vs Turkey ===
3 June 2002
18:00

Brazil	2–1	Turkey
Ronaldo 50'; Rivaldo 87' (pen.)		Şaş 45+2'

Munsu Football Stadium, Ulsan
Attendance: 33,842
Referee: Kim Young-joo (South Korea)

Brazil	Turkey

GK	1	Marcos
CB	4	Roque Júnior
CB	3	Lúcio
CB	5	Edmílson
RWB	2	Cafu (c)
LWB	6	Roberto Carlos
CM	8	Gilberto Silva
CM	19	Juninho Paulista		(substituted off) 72'
RF	11	Ronaldinho		(substituted off) 67'
CF	9	Ronaldo		(substituted off) 73'
LF	10	Rivaldo
Substitutions:
FW	17	Denílson	(yellow card) 73'	(substituted on) 67'
MF	18	Vampeta		(substituted on) 72'
FW	21	Luizão		(substituted on) 73'
Manager:
Luiz Felipe Scolari

GK	1	Rüştü Reçber
CB	5	Alpay Özalan	(yellow card) 44' (red card) 86'
CB	16	Ümit Özat
CB	3	Bülent Korkmaz		(substituted off) 66'
RM	4	Fatih Akyel	(yellow card) 21'
CM	8	Tugay Kerimoğlu		(substituted off) 88'
LM	20	Hakan Ünsal	(yellow card) 24' (yellow-red card) 90+4'
RW	21	Emre Belözoğlu
AM	10	Yıldıray Baştürk		(substituted off) 66'
LW	11	Hasan Şaş
CF	9	Hakan Şükür (c)
Substitutions:
FW	17	İlhan Mansız		(substituted on) 66'
MF	22	Ümit Davala		(substituted on) 66'
FW	6	Arif Erdem		(substituted on) 88'
Manager:
Şenol Güneş

Man of the Match:
Rivaldo (Brazil)

Assistant referees:
Visva Krishnan (Singapore)
Vladimir Fernández (El Salvador)
Fourth official:
Vítor Melo Pereira (Portugal)

=== China vs Costa Rica ===
4 June 2002
15:30

China	0–2	Costa Rica
		Gómez 61'; Wright 65'

Gwangju World Cup Stadium, Gwangju
Attendance: 27,217
Referee: Kyros Vassaras (Greece)

China	Costa Rica

GK	22	Jiang Jin
RB	21	Xu Yunlong	(yellow card) 72'
CB	5	Fan Zhiyi		(substituted off) 74'
CB	14	Li Weifeng
LB	4	Wu Chengying
DM	8	Li Tie	(yellow card) 60'
RM	7	Sun Jihai		(substituted off) 26'
LM	9	Ma Mingyu (c)
AM	18	Li Xiaopeng	(yellow card) 77'
CF	10	Hao Haidong
CF	20	Yang Chen		(substituted off) 66'
Substitutions:
FW	16	Qu Bo		(substituted on) 26'
FW	12	Su Maozhen		(substituted on) 66'
MF	11	Yu Genwei		(substituted on) 74'
Manager:
(Federal Republic of Yugoslavia) Bora Milutinović

GK	1	Erick Lonnis (c)
CB	3	Luis Marín	(yellow card) 15'
CB	4	Mauricio Wright
CB	5	Gilberto Martínez
RM	15	Harold Wallace		(substituted off) 70'
CM	8	Mauricio Solís	(yellow card) 17'
CM	10	Walter Centeno	(yellow card) 85'
CM	11	Rónald Gómez	(yellow card) 79'
LM	22	Carlos Castro
CF	7	Rolando Fonseca		(substituted off) 57'
CF	9	Paulo Wanchope		(substituted off) 80'
Substitutions:
FW	17	Hernán Medford		(substituted on) 57'
FW	16	Steven Bryce		(substituted on) 70'
MF	6	Wilmer López		(substituted on) 80'
Manager:
Alexandre Guimarães

Man of the Match:
Rónald Gómez (Costa Rica)

Assistant referees:
Carlos Mato (Portugal)
Jaap Pool (Netherlands)
Fourth official:
Anders Frisk (Sweden)

=== Brazil vs China ===
8 June 2002
20:30

Brazil	4–0	China
Roberto Carlos 15'; Rivaldo 32'; Ronaldinho 45' (pen.); Ronaldo 55'

Jeju World Cup Stadium, Seogwipo
Attendance: 36,750
Referee: Anders Frisk (Sweden)

Brazil	China

GK	1	Marcos
CB	3	Lúcio
CB	14	Ânderson Polga
CB	4	Roque Júnior	(yellow card) 69'
RWB	2	Cafu (c)
LWB	6	Roberto Carlos
CM	19	Juninho Paulista		(substituted off) 70'
CM	8	Gilberto Silva
RF	10	Rivaldo
CF	9	Ronaldo		(substituted off) 72'
LF	11	Ronaldinho	(yellow card) 25'	(substituted off) 46'
Substitutions:
FW	17	Denílson		(substituted on) 46'
MF	7	Ricardinho		(substituted on) 70'
FW	20	Edílson		(substituted on) 72'
Manager:
Luiz Felipe Scolari

GK	22	Jiang Jin
RB	21	Xu Yunlong
CB	17	Du Wei
CB	14	Li Weifeng
LB	4	Wu Chengying
CM	8	Li Tie
CM	15	Zhao Junzhe
RM	18	Li Xiaopeng
LM	9	Ma Mingyu (c)	(substituted off) 62'
AM	19	Qi Hong	(substituted off) 66'
CF	10	Hao Haidong	(substituted off) 75'
Substitutions:
MF	3	Yang Pu	(substituted on) 62'
MF	6	Shao Jiayi	(substituted on) 66'
FW	16	Qu Bo	(substituted on) 75'
Manager:
(Federal Republic of Yugoslavia) Bora Milutinović

Man of the Match:
Roberto Carlos (Brazil)

Assistant referees:
Leif Lindberg (Sweden)
Bomer Fierro (Ecuador)
Fourth official:
Ali Bujsaim (United Arab Emirates)

=== Costa Rica vs Turkey ===
9 June 2002
18:00

Costa Rica	1–1	Turkey
Parks 86'		Belözoğlu 56'

Incheon World Cup Stadium, Incheon
Attendance: 42,299
Referee: Coffi Codjia (Benin)

Costa Rica	Turkey

GK	1	Erick Lonnis (c)
CB	5	Gilberto Martínez	(yellow card) 24'
CB	4	Mauricio Wright
CB	3	Luis Marín
RM	15	Harold Wallace		(substituted off) 77'
CM	10	Walter Centeno		(substituted off) 66'
CM	8	Mauricio Solís
CM	6	Wilmer López		(substituted off) 77'
CM	11	Rónald Gómez
LM	22	Carlos Castro	(yellow card) 43'
CF	9	Paulo Wanchope
Substitutions:
FW	17	Hernán Medford		(substituted on) 66'
MF	12	Winston Parks		(substituted on) 77'
FW	16	Steven Bryce		(substituted on) 77'
Manager:
Alexandre Guimarães

GK	1	Rüştü Reçber
CB	16	Ümit Özat
CB	2	Emre Aşık	(yellow card) 20'
CB	18	Ergün Penbe
RM	4	Fatih Akyel
CM	8	Tugay Kerimoğlu	(yellow card) 45'	(substituted off) 88'
LM	21	Emre Belözoğlu	(yellow card) 89'
RW	22	Ümit Davala
AM	10	Yıldıray Baştürk		(substituted off) 79'
LW	11	Hasan Şaş
CF	9	Hakan Şükür (c)		(substituted off) 75'
Substitutions:
FW	17	İlhan Mansız		(substituted on) 75'
FW	15	Nihat Kahveci		(substituted on) 79'
FW	6	Arif Erdem		(substituted on) 88'
Manager:
Şenol Güneş

Man of the Match:
Paulo Wanchope (Costa Rica)

Assistant referees:
Dramane Danté (Mali)
Brighton Mudzamiri (Zimbabwe)
Fourth official:
Óscar Ruiz (Colombia)

=== Costa Rica vs Brazil ===
The opening goal for Brazil, a shot from Ronaldo that deflected off Costa Rica's Luis Marín, was initially ruled as an own goal. However, after a protest by Ronaldo, FIFA's technical study group credited him with the goal instead.

13 June 2002
15:30

Costa Rica	2–5	Brazil
Wanchope 39'; Gómez 56'		Ronaldo 10', 13'; Edmílson 38'; Rivaldo 62'; Júnior 64'

Suwon World Cup Stadium, Suwon
Attendance: 38,524
Referee: Gamal Al-Ghandour (Egypt)

Costa Rica	Brazil

GK	1	Erick Lonnis (c)
CB	5	Gilberto Martínez	(substituted off) 74'
CB	4	Mauricio Wright
CB	3	Luis Marín
RM	15	Harold Wallace	(substituted off) 46'
CM	8	Mauricio Solís	(substituted off) 65'
CM	6	Wilmer López
CM	10	Walter Centeno
LM	22	Carlos Castro
CF	9	Paulo Wanchope
CF	11	Rónald Gómez
Substitutions:
FW	16	Steven Bryce	(substituted on) 46'
FW	7	Rolando Fonseca	(substituted on) 65'
MF	12	Winston Parks	(substituted on) 74'
Manager:
Alexandre Guimarães

GK	1	Marcos
CB	3	Lúcio
CB	14	Ânderson Polga
CB	5	Edmílson
RWB	2	Cafu (c)	(yellow card) 90+3'
LWB	16	Júnior
CM	19	Juninho Paulista		(substituted off) 61'
CM	8	Gilberto Silva
RF	20	Edílson		(substituted off) 57'
CF	9	Ronaldo
LF	10	Rivaldo		(substituted off) 72'
Substitutions:
MF	15	Kléberson		(substituted on) 57'
MF	7	Ricardinho		(substituted on) 61'
FW	23	Kaká		(substituted on) 72'
Manager:
Luiz Felipe Scolari

Man of the Match:
Júnior (Brazil)

Assistant referees:
Wagih Farag (Egypt)
Egon Bereuter (Austria)
Fourth official:
Ľuboš Micheľ (Slovakia)

=== Turkey vs China ===
13 June 2002
15:30

Turkey	3–0	China
Şaş 6'; Korkmaz 9'; Davala 85'

Seoul World Cup Stadium, Seoul
Attendance: 43,605
Referee: Óscar Ruiz (Colombia)

Turkey	China

GK	1	Rüştü Reçber		(substituted off) 35'
CB	4	Fatih Akyel
CB	2	Emre Aşık	(yellow card) 19'
CB	3	Bülent Korkmaz
RM	22	Ümit Davala
CM	8	Tugay Kerimoğlu		(substituted off) 84'
LM	20	Hakan Ünsal
RW	10	Yıldıray Baştürk		(substituted off) 70'
AM	11	Hasan Şaş	(yellow card) 81'
LW	21	Emre Belözoğlu	(yellow card) 30'
CF	9	Hakan Şükür (c)
Substitutions:
GK	12	Ömer Çatkıç		(substituted on) 35'
FW	17	İlhan Mansız		(substituted on) 70'
MF	14	Tayfur Havutçu		(substituted on) 84'
Manager:
Şenol Güneş

GK	22	Jiang Jin (c)
RB	21	Xu Yunlong
CB	17	Du Wei
CB	14	Li Weifeng	(yellow card) 62'
LB	4	Wu Chengying		(substituted off) 46'
RM	18	Li Xiaopeng
CM	8	Li Tie
CM	15	Zhao Junzhe
LM	3	Yang Pu	(yellow card) 45+1'
CF	10	Hao Haidong		(substituted off) 73'
CF	20	Yang Chen		(substituted off) 73'
Substitutions:
MF	6	Shao Jiayi	(red card) 58'	(substituted on) 46'
MF	11	Yu Genwei		(substituted on) 73'
FW	16	Qu Bo		(substituted on) 73'
Manager:
(Federal Republic of Yugoslavia) Bora Milutinović

Man of the Match:
Hasan Şaş (Turkey)

Assistant referees:
Ali Tomusange (Uganda)
Curtis Charles (Antigua and Barbuda)
Fourth official:
Byron Moreno (Ecuador)

== See also ==
- Brazil at the FIFA World Cup
- China at the FIFA World Cup
- Costa Rica at the FIFA World Cup
- Turkey at the FIFA World Cup
