= China at the FIFA World Cup =

International football delegation

China first entered World Cup qualification in 1957 in an attempt to qualify for the 1958 FIFA World Cup and made its first appearance in 2002. Despite a respectable performance against Costa Rica, they lost all of their games without scoring a goal with a goal difference of 0-9.

== Overall record ==
China's FIFA World Cup record									Qualification record						
Year	Round	Position	M	W	D	L	GF	GA	M	W	D	L	GF	GA	Link
(Uruguay) 1930	Not a FIFA member								Not a FIFA member						Link
(Italy) 1934	Did not enter								Declined participation						Link
(France) 1938	Did not enter								Declined participation						Link
(Brazil) 1950	Did not enter								Declined participation						Link
(Switzerland) 1954	Did not enter								Declined participation						Link
(Sweden) 1958	Did not qualify								3	1	1	1	4	5	Link
(Chile) 1962	Did not enter								Declined participation						Link
(England) 1966	Did not enter								Declined participation						Link
(Mexico) 1970	Did not enter								Declined participation						Link
(Germany) 1974	Did not enter								Declined participation						Link
(Argentina) 1978	Did not enter								Declined participation						Link
(Spain) 1982	Did not qualify								12	7	2	3	19	8	Link
(Mexico) 1986	Did not qualify								6	4	1	1	23	2	Link
(Italy) 1990	Did not qualify								11	7	0	4	18	9	Link
(United States) 1994	Did not qualify								8	6	0	2	18	4	Link
(France) 1998	Did not qualify								14	8	3	3	24	16	Link
(South Korea) (Japan) 2002	Group stage	31st	3	0	0	3	0	9	14	12	1	1	38	5	Link
(Germany) 2006	Did not qualify								6	5	0	1	14	1	Link
(South Africa) 2010	Did not qualify								8	3	3	2	14	4	Link
(Brazil) 2014	Did not qualify								8	5	0	3	23	9	Link
(Russia) 2018	Did not qualify								18	8	5	5	35	11	Link
(Qatar) 2022	Did not qualify								18	7	4	7	39	22	Link
(Canada) (Mexico) (United States) 2026	Did not qualify								16	5	2	9	16	29	Link
(Morocco) (Portugal) (Spain) 2030	To be determined														
(Saudi Arabia) 2034	To be determined														
Total	Group stage	1/23	3	0	0	3	0	9	142	78	22	42	285	125	Link

== By Match ==
Year	Round	Opponents	Score	Scorers
(South Korea) (Japan) 2002	Group C	Costa Rica	0–2	
(South Korea) (Japan) 2002	Group C	Brazil	0–4	
(South Korea) (Japan) 2002	Group C	Turkey	0–3	

== FIFA World Cup squads and matches ==
=== 2002 South Korea/Japan ===
Pos	Team	Pld	W	D	L	GF	GA	GD	Pts	Qualification
1	Brazil	3	3	0	0	11	3	+8	9	Advance to knockout stage
2	Turkey	3	1	1	1	5	3	+2	4	Advance to knockout stage
3	Costa Rica	3	1	1	1	5	6	−1	4	
4	China	3	0	0	3	0	9	−9	0	

Source: FIFA
Rules for classification: Tie-breaking criteria
4 June 2002
15:30

China	0–2	Costa Rica
	Report	Gómez 61'; Wright 65'

Gwangju World Cup Stadium, Gwangju
Attendance: 27,217
Referee: Kyros Vassaras (Greece)

8 June 2002
20:30

Brazil	4–0	China
Roberto Carlos 15'; Rivaldo 32'; Ronaldinho 45' (pen.); Ronaldo 55'	Report

Jeju World Cup Stadium, Seogwipo
Attendance: 36,750
Referee: Anders Frisk (Sweden)

13 June 2002
15:30

Turkey	3–0	China
Hasan Şaş 6'; Bülent 9'; Davala 85'	Report

Seoul World Cup Stadium, Seoul
Attendance: 43,605
Referee: Óscar Ruiz (Colombia)

== Record players ==
Eight players were fielded in all three of China PR's World Cup matches in 2002.

Rank	Player	Matches
1	Hao Haidong	3
1	Jiang Jin	3
1	Li Tie	3
1	Li Weifeng	3
1	Li Xiaopeng	3
1	Qu Bo	3
1	Wu Chengying	3
1	Xu Yunlong	3

== Head-to-head record ==
Opponent	Pld	W	D	L	GF	GA	GD	Win %
Brazil	1	0	0	1	0	4	−4	0.00
Costa Rica	1	0	0	1	0	2	−2	0.00
Turkey	1	0	0	1	0	3	−3	0.00
Total	3	0	0	3	0	9	−9	0.00

== See also ==
- Asian nations at the FIFA World Cup
- China at the AFC Asian Cup
