= Emilio Aldama =

Paraguayan footballer (born 1977)

Personal information
- Full name: Emilio Ariel Aldama Jara
- Date of birth: 21 June 1977 (age 49)
- Place of birth: Asunción, Paraguay
- Positions: Defender; midfielder

Senior career*
| Years | Team | Apps | (Gls) |
| 1996–1999 | Nacional Asunción | | |
| 2000 | Sol de América | | |
| 1999–2000 | Göztepe A.Ş. | 25 | (0) |
| 2001–2003 | San Lorenzo | | |
| 2003–2006 | Nacional Asunción | | |
| 2006 | Sportivo Trinidense | | |
| 2007-2011 | Presidente Hayes | | |
- * Club domestic league appearances and goals

Emilio Ariel Aldama Jara (born 21 June 1977) is a Paraguayan former professional footballer who played as a defender and midfielder for clubs in Paraguay and for Göztepe S.K. in Turkey's 1999–2000 1.Lig season.

== Playing career ==
Born in Asunción, Aldama began playing football as a defender with local Club Nacional.

=== Göztepe ===
In 1999, Aldama joined Turkish Süper Lig club Göztepe A.Ş. Aldama's contract came into effect on 5 August 1999.

On 10 November 1999, Aldama made his first cup appearance in a 3–2 home victory against Marmaris Belediyespor, playing the entire 90 minutes of the fixture. The match was decided in the last minutes, when Göztepe player Kurthan Yılmaz equalized at 2-2 in the 87th minute, and then scored his hat-trick and Göztepe's third goal in the 89th minute to advance to the next round.

On 11 December 1999, Aldama featured in a 0–0 home draw against Fenerbahçe, coming up against Samuel Johnson, Elvir Bolic and goalkeeper Rüştü Reçber.

On 15 December 1999, Aldama made his second cup appearance in a 3–1 away defeat against Trabzonspor, which eliminated Göztepe from the competition due to a hat-trick by Turkish striker Hami Mandıralı. Aldama played another 90 minutes and was yellow carded in the 61st minute.

On 19 March 2000, Aldama played in a 2–0 home defeat to Galatasaray, playing the entire 90 minutes against an all star squad which contained players as Hasan Sas, Gheorghe Hagi, Emre Belozoglu, Claudio Taffarel, Bulent Korkmaz, Hakan Unsal, Hakan Sukur, Ergun Penbe, Umit Davala and Fatih Akyel.

On 1 April 2000, Aldama made his last league appearance for Gõztepe in a 1–0 home defeat to Bursaspor. Aldama was yellow carded during the game, was Gõztepe ultimaly finished the season with 20 points and in 17th position on the league table, facing relegation for the succeeding season.

Aldama played a total of 25 league games, starting in 24 of them.

His contract expired on 31 May 2000.

=== Sportivo San Lorenzo ===
While playing for San Lorenzo in 2001, Aldama was involved in an on-pitch altercation with players from Sportivo Luqueño and received a 30-month ban from the Paraguayan Football Association. However, his suspension was lifted in February 2003.

=== Nacional Asunción ===
After returning to play with San Lorenzo, Aldama transferred back to his first club, Nacional, where he became the captain.

=== Presidente Hayes ===
Aldama's stay at Presidente Hayes ran up to 2011.

== Coaching career ==
After Aldama retired from playing, he graduated from Paraguay's national sports management program (ENEF) at the Secretaria Nacional de Deportes, and became a football coach. He coached Nacional's youth side.
