= 江津 =

江津 may refer to:

- Gōtsu, Shimane, Japan
- Jiangjin, Chongqing, China
- Jiang Jin (born 1968), a former Chinese Men National Football Term goalkeeper

== See also ==
- The dictionary definition of 江 at Wiktionary
- The dictionary definition of 津 at Wiktionary
