= Jiang Hong =

Chinese footballer

Personal information
- Date of birth: 19 June 1967 (age 59)
- Place of birth: Shanghai, China
- Height: 1.89 m (6 ft 2 1/2 in)
- Position: Goalkeeper

Senior career*
Years	Team	Apps	(Gls)
1988–1994	Bayi Football Team		
1994–1998	Shenzhen Feiyada		
1999	Qingdao Yizhong Hainiu		
2000–2004	Shaanxi Guoli		

International career
1996–1998	China		
- * Club domestic league appearances and goals

Jiang Hong (Chinese: 江洪; pinyin: Jiāng Hóng; born 19 June 1967) is a Chinese former footballer who played as a goalkeeper.

Starting his playing career with Bayi Football Team, before moving to Shenzhen Feiyada. He was eventually called up to the Chinese national side, where for a short period he competed with his brother Jiang Jin for the goalkeeping position. He also played for Qingdao Yizhong Hainiu and Shaanxi Guoli before he retired.

== Honours ==
Shenzhen Feiyada

- Chinese Jia B League: 1995

Shaanxi Guoli

- Chinese Jia B League: 2000
