= Turkey at the UEFA European Championship =

International football delegation

Turkey have participated at six UEFA European Championships so far, with an upcoming seventh appearance in 2032 as co-host; the first group stage they qualified for was Euro 1996. Their best European performance to date was reaching the semi-finals in 2008, after winning their quarter-final match against Croatia on penalties.

== Euro 1996 ==
=== Group stage ===
Pos	Team	Pld	W	D	L	GF	GA	GD	Pts	Qualification
1	Portugal	3	2	1	0	5	1	+4	7	Advance to knockout stage
2	Croatia	3	2	0	1	4	3	+1	6	Advance to knockout stage
3	Denmark	3	1	1	1	4	4	0	4	
4	Turkey	3	0	0	3	0	5	−5	0	

Source: UEFA
Rules for classification: Group stage tiebreakers
11 June 1996
19:30

Turkey	0–1	Croatia
	Report	Vlaović 86'

City Ground, Nottingham
Attendance: 22,460
Referee: Serge Muhmenthaler (Switzerland)

14 June 1996
16:30

Portugal	1–0	Turkey
Couto 66'	Report

City Ground, Nottingham
Attendance: 22,670
Referee: Sándor Puhl (Hungary)

19 June 1996
16:30

Turkey	0–3	Denmark
	Report	B. Laudrup 50', 84'; A. Nielsen 69'

Hillsborough, Sheffield
Attendance: 28,951
Referee: Nikolai Levnikov (Russia)

== Euro 2000 ==
=== Group stage ===
Pos	Team	Pld	W	D	L	GF	GA	GD	Pts	Qualification
1	Italy	3	3	0	0	6	2	+4	9	Advance to knockout stage
2	Turkey	3	1	1	1	3	2	+1	4	Advance to knockout stage
3	Belgium (H)	3	1	0	2	2	5	−3	3	
4	Sweden	3	0	1	2	2	4	−2	1	

Source: UEFA
Rules for classification: Group stage tiebreakers
(H) Hosts
11 June 2000
14:30

Turkey	1–2	Italy
Okan 62'	Report	Conte 52'; Inzaghi 70' (pen.)

GelreDome, Arnhem
Attendance: 22,500
Referee: Hugh Dallas (Scotland)

15 June 2000
20:45

Sweden	0–0	Turkey
	Report

Philips Stadion, Eindhoven
Attendance: 27,000
Referee: Dick Jol (Netherlands)

19 June 2000
20:45

Turkey	2–0	Belgium
Hakan Şükür 45+2', 70'	Report

King Baudouin Stadium, Brussels
Attendance: 48,000
Referee: Kim Milton Nielsen (Denmark) (Note: Nielsen suffered an injury in the 39th minute and was replaced by fourth official Günter Benkö (Austria).)

=== Knockout stage ===
Quarter-finals

24 June 2000
18:00

Portugal	2–0	Turkey
Nuno Gomes 44', 56'	Report

Amsterdam Arena, Amsterdam
Attendance: 42,000
Referee: Dick Jol (Netherlands)

== Euro 2008 ==
=== Group stage ===
Pos	Team	Pld	W	D	L	GF	GA	GD	Pts	Qualification
1	Portugal	3	2	0	1	5	3	+2	6 (Note: Head-to-head result: Portugal 2–0 Turkey.)	Advance to knockout stage
2	Turkey	3	2	0	1	5	5	0	6	Advance to knockout stage
3	Czech Republic	3	1	0	2	4	6	−2	3 (Note: Head-to-head result: Switzerland 0–1 Czech Republic.)	
4	Switzerland (H)	3	1	0	2	3	3	0	3	

Source: UEFA
Rules for classification: Group stage tiebreakers
(H) Hosts
Notes:
7 June 2008
20:45

Portugal	2–0	Turkey
Pepe 61'; Meireles 90+3'	Report

Stade de Genève, Geneva
Attendance: 29,106
Referee: Herbert Fandel (Germany)

11 June 2008
20:45

Switzerland	1–2	Turkey
Yakin 32'	Report	Şentürk 57'; Turan 90+2'

St. Jakob-Park, Basel
Attendance: 39,730
Referee: Ľuboš Micheľ (Slovakia)

15 June 2008
20:45

Turkey	3–2	Czech Republic
Turan 75'; Kahveci 87', 89'	Report	Koller 34'; Plašil 62'

Stade de Genève, Geneva
Attendance: 29,016
Referee: Peter Fröjdfeldt (Sweden)

=== Knockout stage ===
Quarter-finals

20 June 2008
20:45

Croatia	1–1 (a.e.t.)	Turkey
Klasnić 119'	Report	Şentürk 120+2'
Penalties
Modrić (penalty missed); Srna (penalty scored); Rakitić (penalty missed); Petrić (penalty missed)	1–3	(penalty scored) Turan; (penalty scored) Şentürk; (penalty scored) Altıntop

Ernst-Happel-Stadion, Vienna
Attendance: 51,428
Referee: Roberto Rosetti (Italy)

Semi-finals

25 June 2008
20:45

Germany	3–2	Turkey
Schweinsteiger 26'; Klose 79'; Lahm 90'	Report	Boral 22'; Şentürk 86'

St. Jakob-Park, Basel
Attendance: 39,374
Referee: Massimo Busacca (Switzerland)

== Euro 2016 ==
=== Group stage ===
Pos	Team	Pld	W	D	L	GF	GA	GD	Pts	Qualification
1	Croatia	3	2	1	0	5	3	+2	7	Advance to knockout stage
2	Spain	3	2	0	1	5	2	+3	6	Advance to knockout stage
3	Turkey	3	1	0	2	2	4	−2	3	
4	Czech Republic	3	0	1	2	2	5	−3	1	

Source: UEFA
Rules for classification: Group stage tiebreakers
12 June 2016
15:00

Turkey	0–1	Croatia
	Report	Modrić 41'

Parc des Princes, Paris
Attendance: 43,842
Referee: Jonas Eriksson (Sweden)

17 June 2016
21:00

Spain	3–0	Turkey
Morata 34', 48'; Nolito 37'	Report

Stade de Nice, Nice
Attendance: 33,409
Referee: Milorad Mažić (Serbia)

21 June 2016
21:00

Czech Republic	0–2	Turkey
	Report	Yılmaz 10'; Tufan 65'

Stade Bollaert-Delelis, Lens
Attendance: 32,836
Referee: Willie Collum (Scotland)

Ranking of third-placed teams

Pos	Grp	Team	Pld	W	D	L	GF	GA	GD	Pts	Qualification
1	B	Slovakia	3	1	1	1	3	3	0	4	Advance to knockout stage
2	E	Republic of Ireland	3	1	1	1	2	4	−2	4	Advance to knockout stage
3	F	Portugal	3	0	3	0	4	4	0	3	Advance to knockout stage
4	C	Northern Ireland	3	1	0	2	2	2	0	3	Advance to knockout stage
5	D	Turkey	3	1	0	2	2	4	−2	3	
6	A	Albania	3	1	0	2	1	3	−2	3	

Source: UEFA
Rules for classification: 1) Higher number of points obtained; 2) Superior goal difference; 3) Higher number of goals scored; 4) Fair play conduct; 5) Position in the UEFA national team coefficient ranking system.

== Euro 2020 ==
=== Group stage ===
Pos	Team	Pld	W	D	L	GF	GA	GD	Pts	Qualification
1	Italy (H)	3	3	0	0	7	0	+7	9	Advance to knockout stage
2	Wales	3	1	1	1	3	2	+1	4 (Note: Tied on head-to-head result (Wales 1–1 Switzerland). Overall goal difference was used as the tiebreaker.)	Advance to knockout stage
3	Switzerland	3	1	1	1	4	5	−1	4	Advance to knockout stage
4	Turkey	3	0	0	3	1	8	−7	0	

Source: UEFA
Rules for classification: Group stage tiebreakers
(H) Hosts
Notes:
11 June 2021
21:00

Turkey	0–3	Italy
	Report	Demiral 53' (o.g.); Immobile 66'; Insigne 79'

Stadio Olimpico, Rome
Attendance: 12,916
Referee: Danny Makkelie (Netherlands)

16 June 2021
18:00 (20:00 UTC+4)

Turkey	0–2	Wales
	Report	Ramsey 42'; C. Roberts 90+5'

Olympic Stadium, Baku
Attendance: 19,762
Referee: Artur Soares Dias (Portugal)

20 June 2021
18:00 (20:00 UTC+4)

Switzerland	3–1	Turkey
Seferovic 6'; Shaqiri 26', 68'	Report	Kahveci 62'

Olympic Stadium, Baku
Attendance: 17,138
Referee: Slavko Vinčić (Slovenia)

== Euro 2024 ==
=== Group stage ===
Pos	Team	Pld	W	D	L	GF	GA	GD	Pts	Qualification
1	Portugal	3	2	0	1	5	3	+2	6 (Note: Head-to-head result: Turkey 0–3 Portugal.)	Advance to knockout stage
2	Turkey	3	2	0	1	5	5	0	6	Advance to knockout stage
3	Georgia	3	1	1	1	4	4	0	4	Advance to knockout stage
4	Czech Republic	3	0	1	2	3	5	−2	1	

Source: UEFA
Notes:
18 June 2024
18:00

Turkey	3–1	Georgia
Müldür 25'; Güler 65'; Aktürkoğlu 90+7'	Report	Mikautadze 32'

Westfalenstadion, Dortmund
Attendance: 59,127
Referee: Facundo Tello (Argentina)

22 June 2024
18:00

Turkey	0–3	Portugal
	Report	B. Silva 21'; Akaydin 28' (o.g.); Fernandes 56'

Westfalenstadion, Dortmund
Attendance: 61,047
Referee: Felix Zwayer (Germany)

26 June 2024
21:00

Czech Republic	1–2	Turkey
Souček 66'	Report	Çalhanoğlu 51'; Tosun 90+4'

Volksparkstadion, Hamburg
Attendance: 47,683
Referee: István Kovács (Romania)

=== Knockout stage ===
Round of 16

2 July 2024
21:00

Austria	1–2	Turkey
Gregoritsch 66'	Report	Demiral 1', 59'

Red Bull Arena, Leipzig
Attendance: 38,305
Referee: Artur Soares Dias (Portugal)

Quarter-finals

6 July 2024
21:00

Netherlands	2–1	Turkey
De Vrij 70'; Müldür 76' (o.g.)	Report	Akaydin 35'

Olympiastadion, Berlin
Attendance: 70,091
Referee: Clément Turpin (France)

== Euro 2032 ==
Turkey automatically qualified for the 2032 edition as co-host.

== Overall record ==
UEFA European Championship record
Year	Round	Position	Pld	W	D*	L	GF	GA
(France) 1960	Did not qualify							
(Spain) 1964	Did not qualify							
(Italy) 1968	Did not qualify							
(Belgium) 1972	Did not qualify							
(Socialist Federal Republic of Yugoslavia) 1976	Did not qualify							
(Italy) 1980	Did not qualify							
(France) 1984	Did not qualify							
(West Germany) 1988	Did not qualify							
(Sweden) 1992	Did not qualify							
(England) 1996	Group stage	16th	3	0	0	3	0	5
(Belgium) (Netherlands) 2000	Quarter-finals	6th	4	1	1	2	3	4
(Portugal) 2004	Did not qualify							
(Austria) (Switzerland) 2008	Semi-finals	3rd	5	2	1*	2	8	9
(Poland) (Ukraine) 2012	Did not qualify							
(France) 2016	Group stage	17th	3	1	0	2	2	4
(Europe) 2020	Group stage	24th	3	0	0	3	1	8
(Germany) 2024	Quarter-finals	7th	5	3	0	2	8	8
(United Kingdom) (Republic of Ireland) 2028	To be determined							
(Italy) (Turkey) 2032	Qualified as co-hosts							
Total	Semi-finals	6/17	23	7	2	14	22	38

*Denotes draws including knockout matches decided via penalty shoot-out.

== See also ==
- Turkey at the FIFA Confederations Cup
- Turkey at the FIFA World Cup

== Head-to-head record ==
Opponent	Pld	W	D	L	GF	GA	GD	Win %
Austria	1	1	0	0	2	1	+1	100.00
Belgium	1	1	0	0	2	0	+2	100.00
Croatia	3	0	1	2	1	3	−2	0.00
Czech Republic	3	3	0	0	7	3	+4	100.00
Denmark	1	0	0	1	0	3	−3	0.00
Georgia	1	1	0	0	3	1	+2	100.00
Germany	1	0	0	1	2	3	−1	0.00
Italy	2	0	0	2	1	5	−4	0.00
Netherlands	1	0	0	1	1	2	−1	0.00
Portugal	4	0	0	4	0	8	−8	0.00
Spain	1	0	0	1	0	3	−3	0.00
Sweden	1	0	1	0	0	0	+0	0.00
Switzerland	2	1	0	1	3	4	−1	50.00
Wales	1	0	0	1	0	2	−2	0.00
Total	23	7	2	14	22	38	−16	30.43
