= Jeju World Cup Stadium =

Soccer-specific stadium in Jeju Province, South Korea

Coordinates: 33°14′46.10″N 126°30′33.14″E

- 윈드 포스 (Wind force)
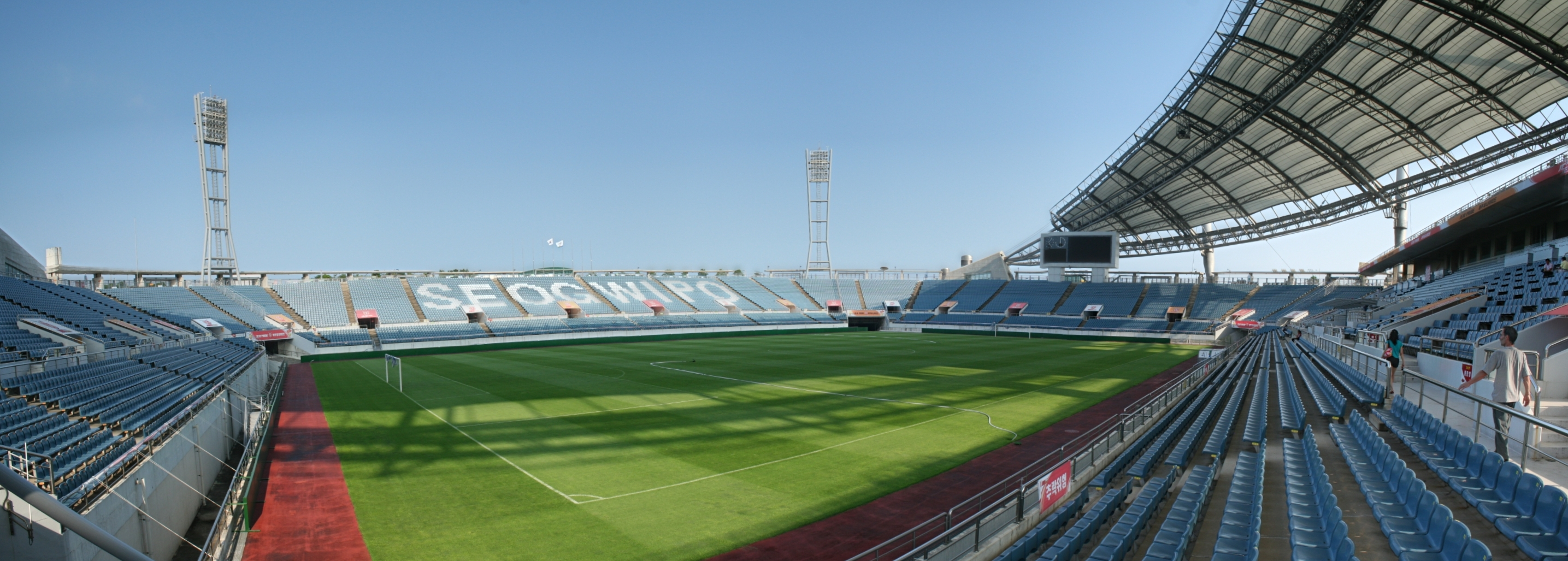
- Interior of the stadium
- Interactive map of Jeju World Cup Stadium
- Location: 914 Beophwan-dong, Seogwipo-si, Jeju, South Korea
- Owner: Jeju Special Self-Governing Province
- Operator: Seogwipo City Hall Culture, Tourism and Sports Department
- Capacity: 29,791
- Field size: 117 by 78 metres (128 by 85 yards)

Construction
- Groundbreaking: 20 February 1999
- Opened: 9 December 2001
- Cost: 112.5 billion won

Tenant
- Jeju SK (2006–present)

Jeju World Cup Stadium is a football stadium located in the city of Seogwipo, on the South Korean island of Jeju, which is administratively part of the eponymous province. Since 2006, the stadium has been home of the K League club Jeju SK. It was built for the 2002 FIFA World Cup with a capacity of 42,000. Temporary seating in the East Stand was later removed and moved to other venues, reducing the capacity to 29,346 spectators.

The design of the stadium, which is in the shape of mouth of a volcano, is based on Jeju Island's natural volcanic environment and its sea surroundings. The roof of the stadium is in the form of nets of traditional fishing boats in Jeju.

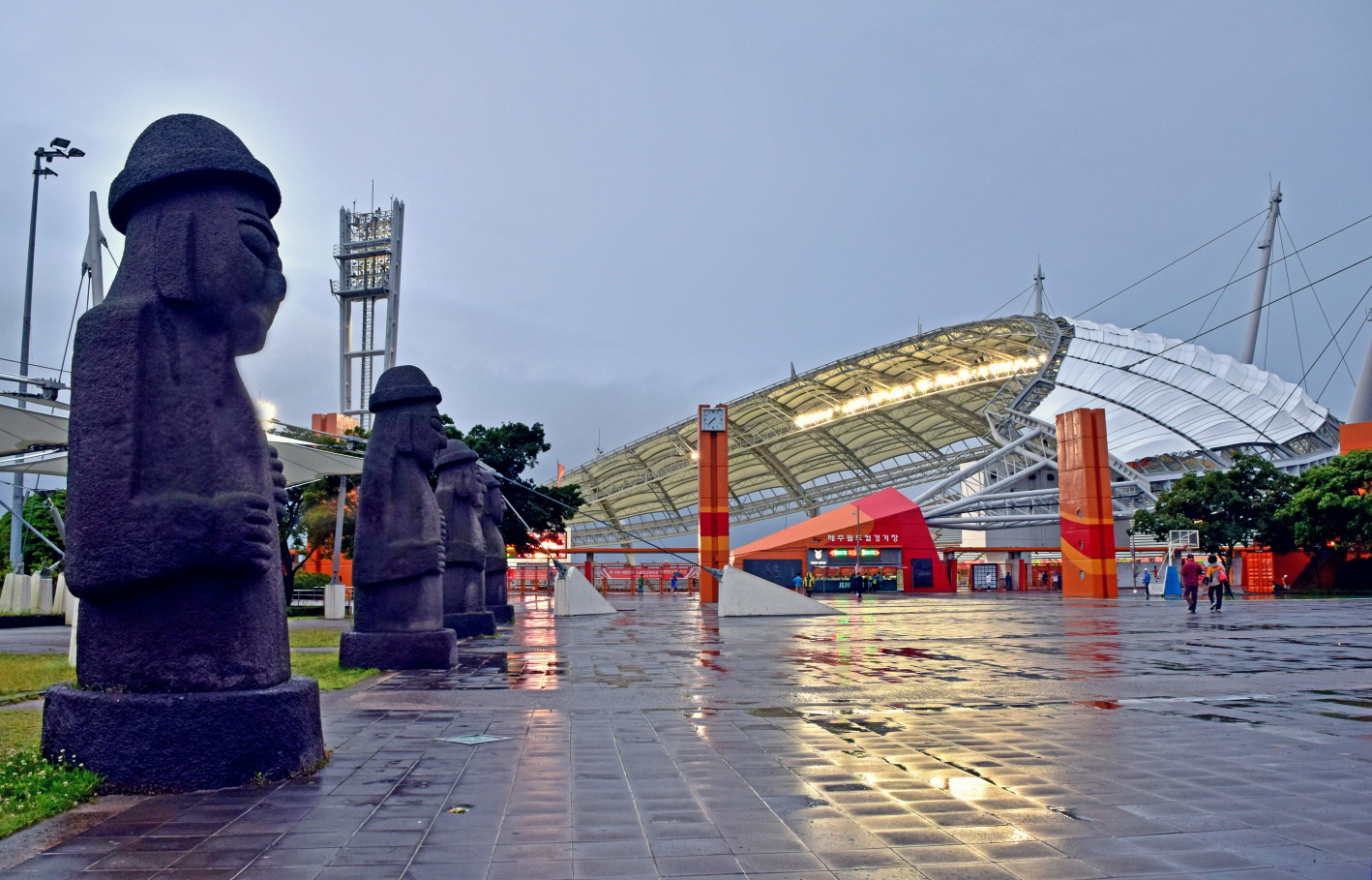
Jeju World Cup Stadium exterior

== 2002 FIFA World Cup matches ==
Jeju World Cup Stadium hosted three matches at the 2002 FIFA World Cup.

Date	Team 1	Result	Team 2	Round	Attendance
8 June 2002	Brazil	4–0	China	Group C	36,750
12 June 2002	Slovenia	1–3	Paraguay	Group B	30,176
15 June 2002	Germany	1–0	Paraguay	Round of 16	25,176
