= Alpay Özalan =

Turkish footballer, manager, and politician

Alpay Özalan MP
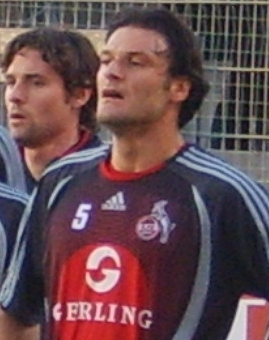
- Alpay training with 1. FC Köln in 2006

Member of the Grand National Assembly
- Incumbent
- Assumed office 7 July 2018
- Constituency: İzmir (II) (2018, 2023)

Personal details
- Born: Fehmi Alpay Özalan; 30 May 1973 (age 53) İzmir, Turkey
- Party: Justice and Development Party (2018–present)
- Height: 1.88 m (6 ft 2 in)
- Children: 2
Association football career
- Position: Centre back
Senior career*
Years	Team	Apps	(Gls)
1991–1992	Soma Linyitspor	19	(2)
1992–1993	Altay	23	(1)
1993–1999	Beşiktaş	150	(9)
1999–2000	Siirt Jet-Pa Spor	0	(0)
1999–2000	→ Fenerbahçe (loan)	29	(3)
2000–2003	Aston Villa	58	(1)
2003–2004	Incheon United	8	(0)
2004–2005	Urawa Red Diamonds	13	(0)
2005–2008	1. FC Köln	48	(1)
Total		348	(14)
International career
1992–1994	Turkey U21	19	(0)
1993	Turkey Olympic	4	(0)
1995–2005	Turkey	90	(4)
Managerial career
- 2016–2017: Eskişehirspor
- 2017: Samsunspor
Medal record
Third place	FIFA World Cup	2002
- * Club domestic league appearances and goals

Fehmi Alpay Özalan (born 29 May 1973), known mononymously as Alpay, is a Turkish former professional footballer, football manager and politician. He last worked as the manager of Samsunspor. He played 90 international games for Turkey between 1995 and 2005, making him Turkey's seventh-most capped player of all time. This included performances at two European Championships and the 2002 World Cup, in which he was selected for the Team of the Tournament. Since 2018, he is a member of the Grand National Assembly of Turkey for the Justice and Development Party (AKP) for İzmir.

== Club career ==
=== Early career ===
His senior career started at Soma Linyitspor at TFF Third League. His performances caught the eye of the biggest teams in Turkey.

In 1993, Özalan signed for Beşiktaş, one of the major Turkish clubs. Özalan set an undesirable record in the Süper Lig, earning three red cards in the space of six months. He played 148 matches for Beşiktaş, netting nine times. After six years at the club, a new deal could not be negotiated. His contract was initially bought by Siirt Jetpaspor, and he was then loaned to Fenerbahçe. In his sole season at Fenerbahçe, he played 26 matches, and found the net three times.

=== Aston Villa ===
After superlative performances for his country at Euro 2000, the 29-year-old Özalan signed for English club Aston Villa. He enjoyed a good first season with Villa and became a fan favourite. His abilities caught the interest of Arsenal and Newcastle United. His partnership with Olof Mellberg as central-defensive partners was cut short as Özalan injured his ankle which sidelined him for the remainder of the season. He recovered just in time for the 2002 World Cup, in which he formed the core of an obstinate Turkish defensive unit. They finished third and he was named in the team of the tournament.

The biggest clubs in Europe took note of his performances in the Far East, including the likes of Barcelona and Internazionale. Aston Villa manager Graham Taylor refused to sell him, which was the beginning of Özalan's downfall at Villa Park. Media reports and comments made by Taylor led to Özalan becoming a very unpopular figure at the club, missing much of the 2002–03 season. Their goalkeeper, Peter Schmeichel, defended Özalan in his article in the English newspaper, The Times.

What happened after the World Cup, when he was frozen out by Graham Taylor, was sad. There are a lot of politics at Villa, and the way Alpay was portrayed as a money-grabber was nothing like the guy that I know. Taylor is just not keen on players with a bigger profile than himself.

Özalan returned to the Aston Villa team for the beginning of the 2003–04 season. In his first home game against Charlton Athletic, he was booed when walking on to the pitch by his own fans. However Özalan went on to score the first goal of that game. In consequence to his earlier booing, Özalan's goal celebration served to mock the Aston Villa fans by placing his finger on his mouth. He was again dropped due to their angry reaction. The Turkish defender was then made public enemy number one in England in late 2003 after a run-in with David Beckham during the Euro 2004 qualifier in Istanbul. He first confronted the England skipper after his first-half penalty miss, glowering over him and rubbing heads with him in full view of the referee. He followed that up by prodding a finger into Beckham's face as the players came off the pitch at half-time, sparking a tunnel brawl. Due to the angry reactions in England, his contract was terminated by Aston Villa on 23 October. Club chairman Doug Ellis declared:

In light of recent events, it would have been difficult for Özalan to represent Aston Villa again and the player himself was aware that life in England had become increasingly difficult for him and his family. Therefore, both parties agreed that the best course of action was for the immediate termination of his contract which was due to expire in June 2004.

=== Incheon United ===
Werder Bremen, Hamburger SV, Borussia Mönchengladbach, Hertha Berlin and Bologna wanted to sign Özalan. However, the European transfer window was closed and he did not want to wait to play football again. He opted for a move to South Korean K-League side Incheon United's first foray into professional football in 2004. He became a South Korean citizen while he was playing there.

=== Urawa Red Diamonds ===
Özalan spent less than six months with the team before moving to the J1 League with Urawa Red Diamonds. In his first season with the club, he was honoured with the best defender of the year award. The following season with the club proved to be a catastrophe. Alpay received three red cards in seven matches. The Japanese club annulled his contract due to these disciplinary problems.

=== 1. FC Köln ===
In 2005, Özalan signed a one-year contract with the Bundesliga team 1. FC Köln. This transfer ensured his place back into the national team. They were relegated, and Manchester City, Portsmouth, Celtic, Galatasaray and Beşiktaş were interested in signing him. Özalan stayed with the club, stating that his decision was influenced by his family's happiness in Germany.

== International career ==
Özalan made 87 appearances for the Turkey national team, netting four times. Three of those goals were a hat-trick against Macedonia during the 2002 FIFA World Cup qualifier. He was one of the best players for his country in the 2002 FIFA World Cup, where the team reached an unprecedented third place in the tournament. Özalan also featured for Turkey in Euro 1996, Euro 2000 and the 2003 FIFA Confederations Cup. A very memorable moment in Özalan's career in complete contrast to his general fame was during Euro 1996 in the game between Croatia and Turkey. In a counterattack, he allowed Croatian Goran Vlaović to dribble the ball half the field without fouling him to stop the attack. In consequence, Vlaović scored the sole goal of the game and Turkey lost. Özalan was awarded with a fair-play award due to his action. On 24 June 2000, he was sent off during the first half of the Euro 2000 quarter-final against Portugal, which his country lost 2–0. His final match was against Switzerland in the 2006 FIFA World Cup second leg play-off tie in Istanbul, conceding a second-minute penalty by handball, converted by Alexander Frei which resulted in Turkey's elimination despite a 4–2 victory. Özalan was involved in a brawl at the end of the game and was awarded a six-match ban by FIFA.

== Politician ==
In the Parliamentary elections of 24 June 2018, he was elected a member of the Grand National Assembly of Turkey representing Izmir for the AKP. According to his own statement he was more excited the first day in parliament than when playing football before 85,000 people. In 2021, he was involved in a brawl in the Turkish parliament where he was seen fighting against Özgür Özel, a politician of the Republican People's Party (CHP).

During the Claw lock military operation against the Kurdistan Workers Party (PKK), he demanded the cancellation of a concert of Aynur Dogan in Istanbul, because he deemed her a supporter of the PKK. In August 2024, Özalan attacked and slapped Ahmet Şık, a member of parliament from the Workers' Party of Turkey, in parliament in Ankara during a debate on the imprisoned human rights lawyer Can Atalay. Şık fell, whereupon a brawl broke out involving several people.

== Career statistics ==
=== Club ===
Appearances and goals by club, season and competition
Club	Season	League			Cup (Note: Includes Turkish Cup, FA Cup, Emperor's Cup and DFB-Pokal.)		Continental (Note: Includes UEFA Champions League, UEFA Cup an UEFA Intertoto Cup.)		Other (Note: Includes Turkish Super Cup, Chancellor Cup, President Cup and TSYD Cup, EFL Cup, Nabisco Cup, J1 League Championship play-offs.)		Total	
Club	Season	Division	Apps	Goals	Apps	Goals	Apps	Goals	Apps	Goals	Apps	Goals
Soma Linyitspor	1991–92	TFF Third League	19	2	0	0	—		—		19	2
Altay	1992–93	1. Lig (Note: Competition was named respectively as "Millî Lig" between 1959–1962, "Türkiye 1. Futbol Ligi" (1. Lig) between 1962–2000, and "Süper Lig" from 2001 on.)	23	1	1	0	—		—		24	1
Beşiktaş	1993–94	1. Lig	11	0	4	1	2	0	2	0	19	1
Beşiktaş	1994–95	1. Lig	29	3	1	1	3	0	4	0	37	4
Beşiktaş	1995–96	1. Lig	31	2	3	0	2	0	2	0	38	2
Beşiktaş	1996–97	1. Lig	26	3	5	1	6	0	4	0	41	4
Beşiktaş	1997–18	1. Lig	26	1	6	2	7	0	3	0	42	3
Beşiktaş	1998–99	1. Lig	27	0	7	1	4	0	2	0	40	1
Beşiktaş	Total		150	9	26	6	24	0	17	0	217	15
Siirt Jet-Pa Spor	1999–2000	TFF First League	0	0	0	0	—		—		0	0
Fenerbahçe (loan)	1999–2000	1. Lig	29	3	1	0	2	0	2	1	34	4
Aston Villa	2000–01	Premier League	33	0	2	0	—		1	0	36	0
Aston Villa	2001–02	Premier League	14	0	2	0	6	0	2	0	24	0
Aston Villa	2002–03	Premier League	5	0	0	0	0	0	—		5	0
Aston Villa	2003–04	Premier League	6	1	0	0	—		—		6	1
Aston Villa	Total		58	1	4	0	6	0	3	0	71	1
Incheon United	2004	K League	8	0	0	0	—		—		8	0
Urawa Red Diamonds	2004	J1 League	10	0	0	0	—		7	0	17	0
Urawa Red Diamonds	2005	J1 League	3	0	0	0	—		4	0	7	0
Urawa Red Diamonds	Total		13	0	0	0	—		11	0	24	0
1. FC Köln	2005–06	Bundesliga	21	1	0	0	—		—		21	1
1. FC Köln	2006–07	2. Bundesliga	27	0	2	0	—		—		29	0
1. FC Köln	2007–08	2. Bundesliga	0	0	0	0	—		—		0	0
1. FC Köln	Total		48	1	2	0	—		—		50	1
Career total			348	14	33	6	32	0	33	1	447	21

=== International ===
Appearances and goals by national team and year
National team	Year	Apps	Goals
Turkey	1995	15	1
Turkey	1996	13	0
Turkey	1997	5	0
Turkey	1998	5	0
Turkey	1999	7	0
Turkey	2000	5	0
Turkey	2001	11	3
Turkey	2002	11	0
Turkey	2003	12	0
Turkey	2004	0	0
Turkey	2005	6	0
Total		90	4

=== International goals ===
Scores and results list Turkey's goal tally first, score column indicates score after each Özalan goal.

List of international goals scored by Alpay Özalan
No.	Date	Venue	Opponent	Score	Result	Competition
1	4 June 1995	Toronto, Canada	Canada	1–0	3–1	Friendly match
2	6 June 2001	Bursa, Turkey	Macedonia	1–2	3–3	2002 FIFA World Cup qualification
3	6 June 2001	Bursa, Turkey	Macedonia	2–2	3–3	2002 FIFA World Cup qualification
4	6 June 2001	Bursa, Turkey	Macedonia	3–3	3–3	2002 FIFA World Cup qualification

== Honours ==
Beşiktaş

- Süper Lig: 1994–95
- Turkish Cup: 1994, 1998
- Turkish Super Cup: 1998

Aston Villa

- UEFA Intertoto Cup: 2001^{[A]}

Urawa Red Diamonds

- Emperor's Cup: 2005

Turkey

- FIFA World Cup third place: 2002
- FIFA Confederations Cup third place: 2003

Individual

- FIFA World Cup All Star Team: 2002
- J1 League Defender of the Year: 2004

Order

- Turkish State Medal of Distinguished Service

== Footnotes ==
A. In 2001 Aston Villa were one of three co-winners of the Intertoto Cup with Paris Saint-Germain and Troyes AC. The club also won all of their 2008 Intertoto Cup rounds to be named joint-winners and progress to the UEFA Cup, the format was changed in 2006 to award the Intertoto Trophy to the side progressing furthest in the UEFA Cup, which was S.C. Braga.
