= Fatih Akyel =

Turkish footballer (born 1977)

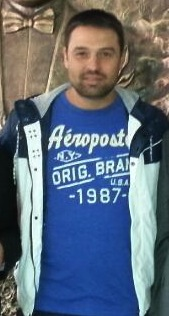

Personal information
- Date of birth: 26 December 1977 (age 48)
- Place of birth: Istanbul, Turkey
- Height: 1.80 m (5 ft 11 in)
- Position: Defender

Senior career*
| Years | Team | Apps | (Gls) |
| 1995–1996 | Galatasaray | 0 | (0) |
| 1996–1997 | Bakırköyspor | 29 | (0) |
| 1997–2001 | Galatasaray | 105 | (8) |
| 2001 | Mallorca | 5 | (0) |
| 2001–2004 | Fenerbahçe | 70 | (0) |
| 2005 | VfL Bochum | 1 | (0) |
| 2005–2006 | PAOK | 16 | (0) |
| 2006–2007 | Trabzonspor | 33 | (0) |
| 2007 | Gençlerbirliği | 0 | (0) |
| 2007 | Ankaragücü | 0 | (0) |
| 2007–2010 | Kasımpaşa | 36 | (0) |
| 2009 | → Kocaelispor (loan) | 0 | (0) |
| 2010 | Tepecik Belediyespor | 1 | (0) |
| Total | | 297 | (8) |

International career
| 1995–1996 | Turkey U18 | 9 | (0) |
| 1996–1997 | Turkey U21 | 1 | (0) |
| 1997 | Turkey Olympic | 5 | (0) |
| 1997–2004 | Turkey | 64 | (0) |

Managerial career
- 2014: Elazığspor (assistant)
- 2015–2016: Gümüşhanespor
- 2016–2017: Kocaeli Birlik Spor
- 2017: Nazilli Belediyespor
- 2018: Zonguldak Kömürspor
- 2018–2019: İnegölspor
- 2019–2020: Gümüşhanespor
- 2020: Adanaspor
Medal record
| Third place | FIFA World Cup | 2002 |
- * Club domestic league appearances and goals

Fatih Akyel (born 26 December 1977) is a Turkish football manager and former professional player. He played as a defender for clubs such as Galatasaray and Fenerbahçe during his 15-year career. He was capped by the Turkey national team 64 times from 1997 to 2004, and also won a silver medal with the Olympic team at the 1997 Mediterranean Games.

== Club career ==
Born in Istanbul, Fatih began his professional career with local club Galatasaray. He signed his first professional contract with the club on 31 July 1995. However, he did not make any appearances for the team, and was transferred to Bakırköyspor the following season. Fatih made 29 appearances for the club, and earned his first cap for the Turkey national under-21 football team. At the end of the season, he returned to Galatasaray. He played for the club for four years, winning three Süper Lig titles and three Turkish Cup titles. He was also a part of the team that won the 1999–2000 UEFA Cup and 2000 UEFA Super Cup, assisting Mário Jardel's game winner against Real Madrid.

Fatih joined RCD Mallorca at the beginning of the 2001–02 season, but he made a quick return to Turkey, signing for Fenerbahçe on 4 December 2001 after five appearances for the Spanish club. With Fenerbahçe, he won another Süper Lig title in 2003–04. Fatih made 70 appearances for the club before his contract was terminated on 8 November 2004. He signed with German club VfL Bochum in 2005, making one appearance. PAOK signed him the following season, where he made 16 appearances before returning to Turkey at the winter break, this time to Trabzonspor. He spent one season with the Black Sea club before being transferred to Gençlerbirliği on 1 February 2007. However, he did not make any appearances for the club.

Fatih later signed for MKE Ankaragücü on 2 July 2007, but quickly left the club, signing for Kasımpaşa on 3 September 2007. He spent three years with the club, with the last year on loan at Kocaelispor. On 27 January 2010, Fatih signed with KFC Uerdingen 05. However, two days later he announced via SMS that he would not join the club. Akyel last played for Tepecikspor, making one appearance for the club before he was arrested in March 2010 on allegations of match-fixing in 2007 and 2008.

== International career ==
Fatih began his international career with the U-18 team in 1995, earning nine caps. He was promoted to the Turkey U21 national team in 1996, where he won one cap. He participated in the 1997 Mediterranean Games, starting all five matches en route to winning a silver medal. In seven years, Fatih won 64 caps for the Turkey national team. He was a part of the Turkey squad that finished in third place at the 2002 FIFA World Cup. He was also a part of the Turkey squad that qualified for the knockout stages of UEFA Euro 2000, and the squad that finished third at the 2003 FIFA Confederations Cup.

== Honours ==
Galatasaray

- Süper Lig: 1997–98, 1998–99, 1999–2000
- Turkish Cup: 1995–96, 1998–99, 1999–2000
- UEFA Cup: 1999–2000
- UEFA Super Cup: 2000

Fenerbahçe

- Süper Lig: 2003–04

Turkey

- FIFA World Cup: Third place 2002
- UEFA European Championship: Quarter Finalist UEFA Euro 2000
- Mediterranean Games: Silver Medal 1997 Mediterranean Games

Order

- Turkish State Medal of Distinguished Service
