= Ümit Davala =

Turkish footballer and coach

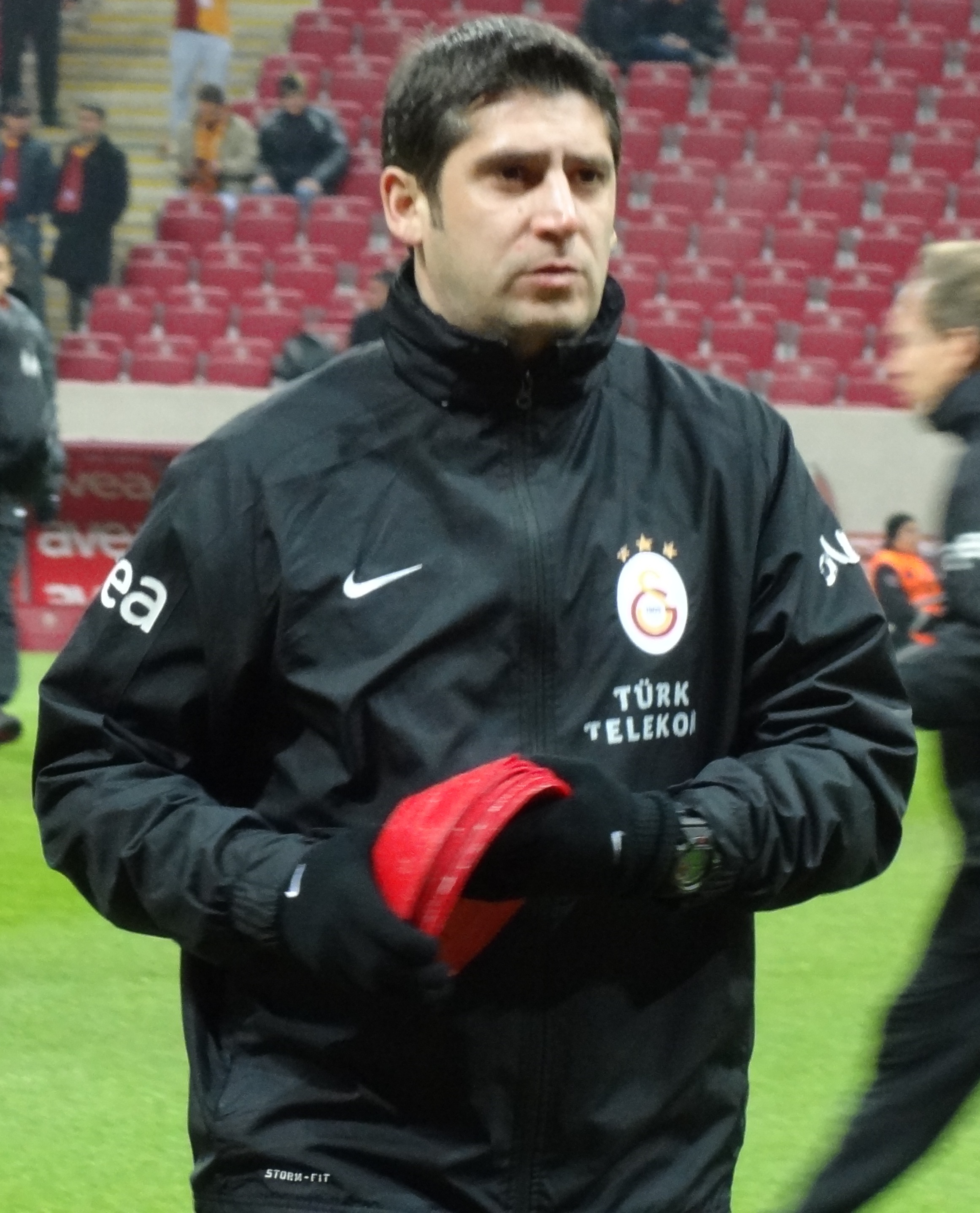
- Davala with Galatasaray in 2012

Personal information
- Full name: Ümit Aydın Davala
- Date of birth: 30 July 1973 (age 53)
- Place of birth: Mannheim, West Germany
- Height: 1.86 m (6 ft 1 in)
- Positions: Defender; midfielder

Youth career
- 1981–1990: VfR Mannheim
- 1990–1992: ASV Feudenheim

Senior career*
Years	Team	Apps	(Gls)
1992–1994	Türkspor Mannheim	0	(0)
1994	Afyonkarahisarspor	11	(3)
1995–1996	İstanbulspor	21	(6)
1996	→ Diyarbakırspor (loan)	15	(2)
1996–2001	Galatasaray	125	(15)
2001–2002	AC Milan	10	(0)
2002–2004	Inter Milan	0	(0)
2002–2003	→ Galatasaray (loan)	23	(1)
2003–2004	→ Werder Bremen (loan)	22	(0)
2004–2005	Werder Bremen	11	(0)
Total		223	(25)

International career
1996–2004	Turkey	41	(4)

Managerial career
- 2007–2008: Turkey U21
- 2013: Galatasaray (caretaker)
- 2017: Tuzlaspor
Medal record
Men's football
Representing Turkey
FIFA World Cup
Third place	2002 Korea/Japan
- * Club domestic league appearances and goals

Ümit Aydın Davala (born 30 July 1973) is a Turkish football coach and former player. During his stint at Galatasaray, he won four Süper Lig, three Turkish Cup, one UEFA Cup and one UEFA Super Cup title between 1996 and 2001. He won the 2003–04 Bundesliga with Werder Bremen. Davala represented Turkey with 41 caps in international competitions, scoring 4 goals. He was part of the Turkey squad which earned a bronze medal at 2002 FIFA World Cup.

== Club career ==
Davala played as a defender of midfielder with VfR Mannheim, ASV Feudenheim, Türkspor Mannheim, Afyonspor, Diyarbakırspor and İstanbulspor before joining Galatasaray in 1997. He won three successive Turkish championships. In 2000, he helped the club to win the Turkish Cup by scoring two goals in the final against Beşiktaş. In the same year, he helped the club win the 2000 UEFA Cup final against Arsenal and the 2000 UEFA Super Cup against Real Madrid.

In September 2001, Davala transferred to Milan in a €5 million deal. He made the transfer because he wanted to follow his former coach at Galatasaray, Fatih Terim, who had been named head coach of Milan. However, in November, Terim was fired and replaced by Carlo Ancelotti, after which Davala lost his first-team place. In June 2002, Davala was sold to Inter Milan in exchange for Dario Šimić, but was immediately loaned to Galatasaray. In July 2003, Davala was loaned to Werder Bremen, helping the club win the Bundesliga and DFB-Pokal double. In July 2004, he was signed permanently by Bremen, but injuries limited his appearances. A hip injury suffered in October 2005 proved too difficult, and over the winter break of the 2005–06 season, Davala was released by the club. He subsequently retired from professional football.

== International career ==
Davala was part of the Turkey squads for UEFA Euro 2000 and the 2002 FIFA World Cup. In the latter, he stood out for his mohawk hair style and scored a goal against PR China in the group stage, adding the winner against Japan in the second round. He also provided the cross that resulted on İlhan Mansız's golden goal against Senegal in the quarter-finals. Turkey would finish the tournament in third place.

== Futsal career ==
Following retirement from professional football, Davala played futsal in international level. He was called up on Turkey national futsal team by head coach Ömer Kaner, in order to qualify to 2010 UEFA Futsal Championship. In an interview held in 2020, Ömer Kaner stated that Davala found hard to accommodate in futsal, at that time.

== Coaching career ==
Davala had been the head coach of Turkey national under-21 team until June 2008. He then joined Galatasaray S.K. as an assistant manager on 11 June 2008. After a loss to Bursaspor, the Galatasaray board stated "radical changes" were on the way, and, true to its word, the board declared that assistant coaches Davala and Edwin Boekamp were sacked on 10 October 2008 after a brief chat with club president Adnan Polat. However, Davala rejoined Galatasaray as an assistant manager again in June 2011.

== Musical career ==
Davala released several rap themed songs, just after he retired from football. One was a collaboration with Kayahan.

== Career statistics ==
=== Club ===
Appearances and goals by club, season and competition
Club	Season	League			Cup (Note: Includes Turkish Cup, Coppa Italia and DFB-Pokal)		Continental (Note: Includes UEFA Champions League, UEFA Cup, UEFA Cup Winners Cup and UEFA Europa League)		Other (Note: Includes UEFA Super Cup, Turkish Super Cup, Presidential Cup, TSYD Cup, Supercoppa Italiana and DFL-Ligapokal)		Total	
Club	Season	Division	Apps	Goals	Apps	Goals	Apps	Goals	Apps	Goals	Apps	Goals
Türkspor Mannheim	1992–93	—	0	0	0	0	—		—		0	0
Türkspor Mannheim	1993–94	—	0	0	0	0	—		—		0	0
Türkspor Mannheim	Total		0	0	0	0	—		—		0	0
Afyonspor	1994–95	TFF Second League	11	3	1	0	—		—		12	3
İstanbulspor	1994–95	TFF Second League	16	5	0	0	—		—		16	5
İstanbulspor	1995–96	TFF First League	5	1	1	0	—		—		6	1
İstanbulspor	Total		21	6	1	0	—		—		22	6
Diyarbakırspor (loan)	1995–96	TFF Second League	15	2	0	0	—		—		15	2
Galatasaray	1996–97	1. Lig (Note: Named respectively as Millî Lig between 1959–1962, Türkiye 1. Futbol Ligi (1. Lig) between 1962–2000, and Süper Lig from 2001 to present)	28	3	2	0	4 (Note: Four appearances at UEFA Cup Winners Cup)	0	4 (Note: Two appearances at TSYD Cup, one appearance and one goal at Presidential Cup, one appearance at Gurbet Kupası)	1	38	4
Galatasaray	1997–98	1. Lig	15	3	3	0	6	0	2 (Note: Two appearances and one goal TSYD Cup)	1	26	4
Galatasaray	1998–99	1. Lig	25	2	8	3	6	1	—		39	6
Galatasaray	1999–2000	1. Lig	28	0	5	2	13 (Note: Seven appearances and two goals at UEFA Champions League and six appearances and one goal at UEFA Cup)	3	2 (Note: Two appearances at TSYD Cup)	0	48	5
Galatasaray	2000–01	1. Lig	26	5	4	3	15 (Note: One appearance UEFA Super Cup and, fourteen appearances and two goals at UEFA Champions League)	2	—		45	10
Galatasaray	2001–02	Süper Lig	3	2	0	0	5	1	—		8	3
Galatasaray	Total		125	15	22	8	49	7	8	2	204	32
Milan	2001–02	Serie A	10	0	0	0	0	0	—		10	0
Inter	2002–03	Serie A	0	0	0	0	0	0	—		0	0
Inter	2003–04	Serie A	0	0	0	0	0	0	—		0	0
Inter	Total		0	0	0	0	0	0	—		0	0
Galatasaray (loan)	2002–03	Süper Lig	23	1	3	0	5	0	—		31	1
Werder Bremen (loan)	2003–04	Bundesliga	22	0	0	0	0	0	—		22	0
Werder Bremen	2004–05	Bundesliga	10	0	0	0	1	0	0	0	11	0
Werder Bremen	2005–06	Bundesliga	1	0	0	0	1	0	0	0	2	0
Werder Bremen	Total		11	0	0	0	2	0	0	0	13	0
Career total			223	25	27	8	51	7	8	2	309	42

=== International ===
Appearances and goals by national team and year
National team	Year	Apps	Goals
Turkey	1996	2	0
Turkey	1997	—	
Turkey	1998	—	
Turkey	1999	4	0
Turkey	2000	5	0
Turkey	2001	9	1
Turkey	2002	15	3
Turkey	2003	5	0
Turkey	2004	1	0
Total		41	4

Scores and results list Turkey's goal tally first, score column indicates score after each Davala goal.

List of international goals scored by Ümit Davala
No.	Date	Venue	Opponent	Score	Result	Competition
1	28 March 2001	City Park Stadium, Skopje, Macedonia	Macedonia	2–1	2–1	2002 FIFA World Cup qualification
2	13 June 2002	Seoul World Cup Stadium, Seoul, South Korea	China	3–0	3–0	2002 FIFA World Cup
3	18 June 2002	Miyagi Stadium, Rifu, Japan	Japan	1–0	1–0	2002 FIFA World Cup
4	16 October 2002	Ali Sami Yen Stadium, Istanbul, Turkey	Liechtenstein	2–0	5–0	UEFA Euro 2004 qualification

== Honours ==
Turkey

- FIFA World Cup third place: 2002

Galatasaray

- UEFA Super Cup: 2000
- UEFA Cup: 1999–2000
- Süper Lig: 1996–97, 1997–98, 1998–99, 1999–2000
- Turkish Cup: 1995–96, 1998–99, 1999–2000

Werder Bremen

- Bundesliga: 2003–04
- DFB-Pokal: 2003–04

Order

- Turkish State Medal of Distinguished Service
