= Jiang Jin =

Chinese footballer

Jiang Jin 江津
Personal information
- Full name: Jiang Jin
- Date of birth: 7 October 1968 (age 58)
- Place of birth: Shanghai, China
- Height: 1.98 m (6 ft 6 in)
- Position: Goalkeeper

Senior career*
Years	Team	Apps	(Gls)
1987–1999	Bayi Football Team	100	(0)
2000–2002	Tianjin Teda	44	(0)
2003–2004	Shanghai International	44	(0)
2005–2007	Shanghai Stars	56	(0)
Total		244	(0)

International career
1993–2002	China	51	(0)
Medal record
Men's football
Representing China
Asian Games
Bronze medal – third place	1998 Bangkok
- * Club domestic league appearances and goals

Jiang Jin (Chinese: 江津; pinyin: Jiāng Jīn; born October 17, 1968, in Tianjin) is a Chinese former professional footballer who played as a goalkeeper.

He was the first-choice goalkeeper for China during the 2002 FIFA World Cup. Along with his older brother Jiang Hong, he also became a goalkeeper and started his career playing for Bayi Football Team before moving to Tianjin Teda, Shanghai International and Shanghai Stars. After a short stint as an assistant coach for Shanghai Stars, he moved away from football. On October 17, 2010, he was detained by the police for his involvement in fixing a league game against Tianjin Teda on November 30, 2003. Subsequently, he was sentenced to five-and-a-half-years imprisonment on June 13, 2012.

== Club career ==
Jiang Jin began his football career playing for Bayi Football Team during the 1987 league season and gradually established himself within the team. During his time with Bayi it became a fully professional football team and despite finding it difficult to transition to professionalism, Jiang was a steady constant within the team. By the 1996 league season his consistency started to pay off when he aided Bayi to third position within the league, which led to an eventual call-up to the national team. While his international career grew from strength to strength, Bayi were struggling within the league until the team were relegated at the end of the 1998 league season. Jiang stayed for a short period before joining Tianjin Teda where he remained for three seasons before joining the highly ambitious side Shanghai International in the 2003 league season that saw his side just miss out on the league title. The next season saw him only make sixteen league appearances and being dropped from being the first choice goalkeeper. This led to Jiang joining second-tier side Shanghai Stars where he was offered an assistant post as well before he retired in 2007.

== International career ==
Jiang Jin was first called up to the senior China team in 1993; however he had to wait until October 31, 1997, before he was given his chance to make his senior debut in the 1998 FIFA World Cup qualifier against Qatar in a 3–2 defeat. Under Bobby Houghton Jiang was given an opportunity to establish himself as the country's first choice goalkeeper and it was during the 1998 Asian Games held in Bangkok that Jiang shone, aiding the country to a third place finish and personally winning the “Asian best goalkeeper” award.

== Match-fixing ==
On October 17, 2010, Jiang Jin was reported to have been detained by the police and was said to have been involved in fixing the November 30, 2003, league game against Tianjin Teda during his stint as a player at Shanghai International. The allegations suggested that his teammate Shen Si was bribed by former Tianjin Teda general manager Yang Yifeng with a total of 12 million Yuan to lose the game and that Shen had asked teammates Jiang Jin, Qi Hong and Li Ming (1975) to help him. After being arrested by the police, a lengthy wait for trial eventually saw Jiang Jin found guilty of match-fixing. He was sentenced to five-and-a-half-years imprisonment on June 13, 2012, and fined 500,000 Yuan along with his associates, except for Shen Si who was given six years.

== Honours ==
Bayi Football Team

- Chinese FA Cup: 1990

China

- Football at the Asian Games bronze medal: 1998

Individual

- AFC Asian Cup Best Goalkeeper: 2000
- AFC Asian Cup Team of the Tournament: 2000
- AFC Asian All Stars: 2000
