= Rüştü Reçber =

Turkish footballer (born 1973)

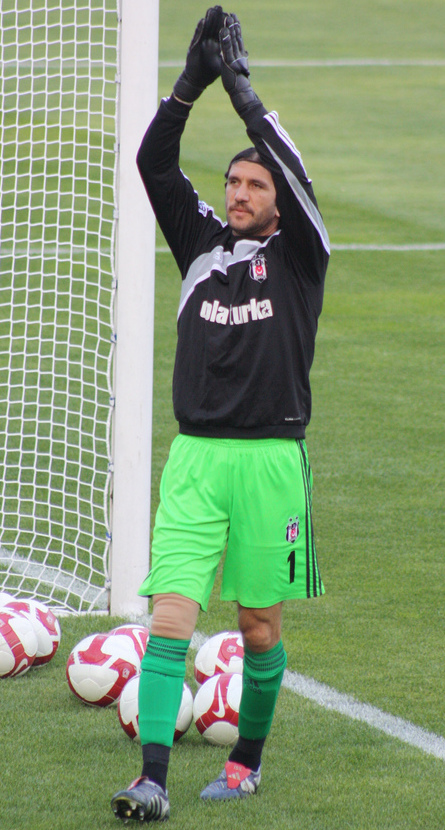
- Reçber playing for Beşiktaş in 2010

Personal information
- Date of birth: 10 May 1973 (age 53)
- Place of birth: Korkuteli, Antalya, Turkey
- Height: 1.87 m (6 ft 2 in)
- Position: Goalkeeper

Youth career
- 1985–1988: Korkutelispor

Senior career*
Years	Team	Apps	(Gls)
1988–1991	Burdurgücü	1	(0)
1991–1993	Antalyaspor	34	(0)
1993–2003	Fenerbahçe	240	(0)
1993–1994	→ Antalyaspor (loan)	33	(0)
2003–2006	Barcelona	4	(0)
2004–2006	→ Fenerbahçe (loan)	46	(0)
2006–2007	Fenerbahçe	8	(0)
2007–2012	Beşiktaş	99	(0)
Total		432	(0)

International career
1992–1993	Turkey U21	11	(0)
1994–2012	Turkey	120	(0)
Medal record
Men's football
Representing Turkey
FIFA World Cup
Third place	2002 Korea/Japan
UEFA European Championship
Third place	2008 Austria–Switzerland
FIFA Confederations Cup
Third place	2003 France
- * Club domestic league appearances and goals

Rüştü Reçber (pronounced [ˈɾyʃty ˈɾetʃbeɾ]; born 10 May 1973) is a Turkish former professional footballer and a current sports executive. During his professional career, he played as a goalkeeper for Antalyaspor, Fenerbahçe, Barcelona and Beşiktaş.

Rüştü was part of the Turkey national squad that reached the semi-finals at the 2002 FIFA World Cup and UEFA Euro 2008. At the former, where Turkey finished third, his performances saw him selected for the tournament's all-star team. He is Turkey's record appearance holder, having earned 120 caps. He made his debut against Iceland in 1994 and his final appearance came against Finland in 2012.

Rüştü was named the best goalkeeper in European competitions in 2002, selected for the 2002 UEFA Team of the Year by public vote. In 2004, he was selected to FIFA 100 by Pelé as one of the 125 best living footballers in the world.

== Club career ==
=== 1985–2003: early years and Fenerbahçe ===
Born in Korkuteli, Rüştü began his career at nearby Antalyaspor, having converted from a forward to a goalkeeper. Early in his career, he missed out on moves to two of the Istanbul-based Big Three of Turkish football: he rejected Galatasaray at the age of 17 because coach Mustafa Denizli wanted him to start off at the youth team, and in 1993 a move to Beşiktaş fell through when he was seriously injured in a car crash.

After debuting for Turkey under-21, Rüştü was told by national manager Fatih Terim in 1992 that he would become the greatest goalkeeper in the nation's history. In 1993, he joined the last remaining of the Big Three, Fenerbahçe, spending his first season back on loan at Antalyaspor. He gained his big break in October 1994, when club and national starting goalkeeper Engin İpekoğlu injured his foot against Kayserispor; he debuted against Petrol Ofisi and went on to make 240 appearances in his first spell, also becoming captain and winning the Süper Lig twice.

=== 2003–2004: Barcelona ===
In July 2003, Rüştü was very close to signing for Arsenal, but he had a dispute with manager Arsène Wenger who he felt insulted his fitness. Instead, he joined La Liga club Barcelona. After manager Frank Rijkaard chose to play Víctor Valdés in the first two league matches because Rüştü's Spanish was still very weak. Rüştü was upset by this, saying "It is not normal for a goalkeeper of my history and caliber to be left out because I don't speak Spanish."

Rüştü made his debut on 15 October 2003 in the UEFA Cup first round second leg at home to Slovakia's MŠK Púchov, an 8–0 win. He totalled only seven games – four in the league, of which the first was a 3–1 win at Espanyol in the Derbi barceloní on 13 December.

=== 2004–2012: return to Fenerbahçe, Beşiktaş ===
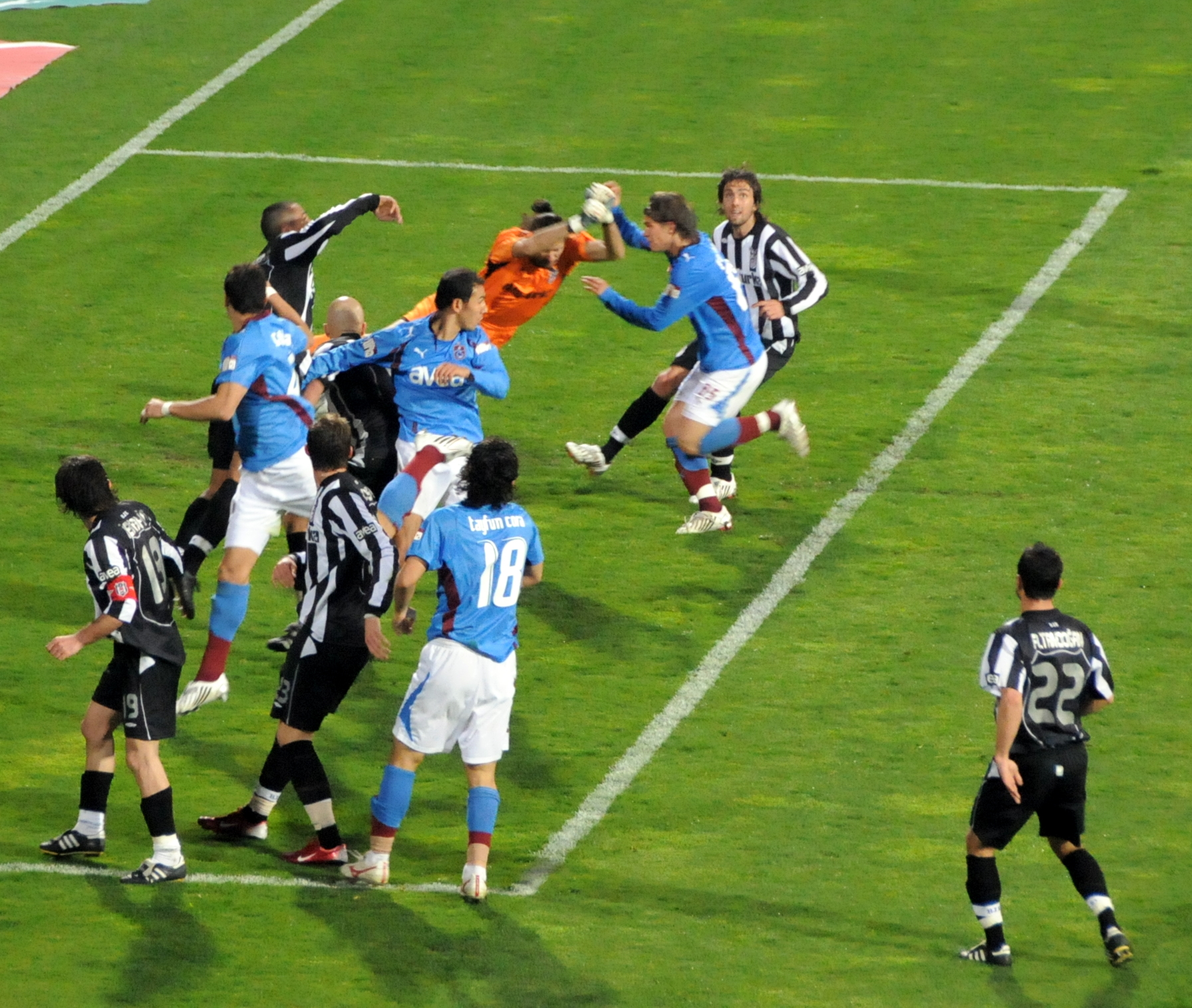
Rüştü (in orange) in action for Beşiktaş against Trabzonspor in March 2008

Having played just four league games (seven overall), Rüştü was loaned back to Fenerbahçe on 27 August 2004 for the season. On 28 July 2005, this was extended for another year. In his combined two spells, Rüştü is the Fenerbahçe goalkeeper with second-most appearances, with 294 games, following Volkan Demirel.

After winning the league title for a third time with Fenerbahçe in 2006–07, Rüştü moved to city rivals Beşiktaş on a three-year deal, along with teammate Mehmet Yozgatlı. Rüştü won the league with his new team in 2008–09. He also won 2010–11 Turkish Cup where he played all 120 minutes, including penalties, as the club won the tournament.

== International career ==
=== 2002 FIFA World Cup ===
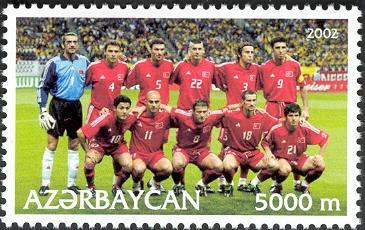
Reçber (top left) played in all of Turkey's fixtures at the 2002 World Cup, and conceded 6 goals in 7 games

Turkey finished third in the 2002 FIFA World Cup in South Korea and Japan. Rüştü was one of two goalkeepers in the 16-man Team of the Tournament, alongside Germany's Oliver Kahn.

On 26 March 2005, captain Rüştü earned his 100th cap in a 2–0 home win over Albania in 2006 FIFA World Cup qualification.

=== Euro 2008 ===
With first choice goalkeeper Volkan Demirel suspended, Rüştü started the UEFA Euro 2008 quarter-final match against Croatia. A questionable foray from his goalmouth allowed Croatia to score the match's first goal with a minute remaining in extra time. Rüştü immediately made amends for his mistake though, assisting on Semih Şentürk's injury time goal in the 122nd minute. In the ensuing penalty shootout, he faced four kicks, saving the last one from Mladen Petrić to secure Turkey's victory in the shootout and enabling Turkey to progress to the Euro semi-finals for the first time ever.

In the aftermath of the 3–2 semi-final loss to Germany, a game in which he was captain, he announced his retirement from the national team. However, he was since called up against Spain for a 2010 FIFA World Cup qualifying match. He was called up for the last time for Turkey in a game against Finland on 26 May 2012, the last of his 120 caps.

== Style of play ==
Rüştü was renowned as a gifted shot-stopper, possessed an excellent positional sense. Using his height, he was also able to come up for high balls. He also possessed strong reflexes and good deflecting ability. Known as a penalty stopper, his shoot-out performance against Croatia in the UEFA Euro 2008 quarter-finals was described as heroic by UEFA in 2015. He was featured in a UEFA Training Ground series video under the title of Rüştü's Turkish Delight, in which he was described as a Master of Penalties. He was an eccentric goalkeeper, who also stood out for his charismatic personality. Physically, he was recognisable for his long hair and anti-glare paint under his eyes. He was also adept at taking goal kicks and clearing backpasses.

== Personal life ==
Rüştü is married to Işıl Reçber (née: Kepe) and the couple have a son and a daughter. The couple first met in period when Rüştü just signed for Fenerbahçe from Antalyaspor, in 1994. Rüştü used to be a Galatasaray supporter in his childhood. His son, Burak, born in 2007, plays football at Galatasaray academy.

In March 2020, Reçber tested positive for COVID-19 amidst the COVID-19 pandemic. He was admitted to hospital for care where he was put under isolation. He was discharged in April.

== Career statistics ==
=== Club ===
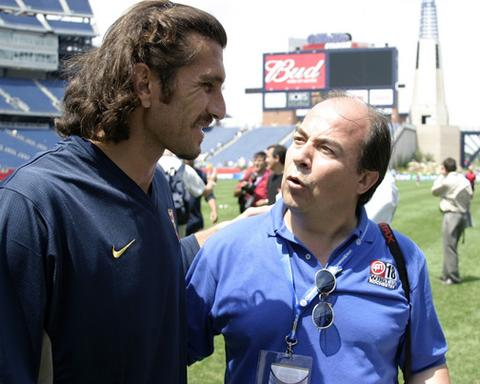
Reçber (left) in 2005

Appearances and goals by club, season and competition
Club	Season	League			Cup		Europe (Note: Appearances in the UEFA Champions League and UEFA Europa League/UEFA Cup)		Total	
Club	Season	Division	Apps	Goals	Apps	Goals	Apps	Goals	Apps	Goals
Burdurgücü	1990–91	3. Lig	1	0	—		—		1	0
Antalyaspor	1991–92	2. Lig	—		—		—		—	
Antalyaspor	1992–93	2. Lig	1	0	—		—		1	0
Antalyaspor	1993–94	2. Lig	33	0	—		—		33	0
Antalyaspor	Total		34	0	—		—		34	0
Fenerbahçe	1994–95	1. Lig (Note: Named respectively as Milli Lig between 1959–1962, Türkiye 1. Futbol Ligi (1. Lig) between 1962–2000, and Süper Lig from 2001 to present)	9	0	2	0	—		11	0
Fenerbahçe	1995–96	1. Lig	29	0	6	0	4	0	39	0
Fenerbahçe	1996–97	1. Lig	27	0	2	0	8	0	37	0
Fenerbahçe	1997–98	1. Lig	33	0	5	0	2	0	40	0
Fenerbahçe	1998–99	1. Lig	30	0	—		4	0	34	0
Fenerbahçe	1999–00	1. Lig	25	0	1	0	2	0	28	0
Fenerbahçe	2000–01	1. Lig	33	0	5	0	—		38	0
Fenerbahçe	2001–02	Süper Lig (Note: Named respectively as Milli Lig between 1959–1962, Türkiye 1. Futbol Ligi (1. Lig) between 1962–2000, and Süper Lig from 2001 to present)	30	0	1	0	8	0	39	0
Fenerbahçe	2002–03	Süper Lig	24	0	—		6	0	30	0
Fenerbahçe	Total		240	0	22	0	34	0	296	0
Barcelona	2003–04	La Liga	4	0	—		3	0	7	0
Fenerbahçe (loan)	2004–05	Süper Lig	29	0	4	0	8	0	41	0
Fenerbahçe (loan)	2005–06	Süper Lig	17	0	2	0	—		19	0
Fenerbahçe (loan)	Total		46	0	6	0	8	0	60	0
Fenerbahçe	2006–07	Süper Lig	8	0	—		7	0	15	0
Beşiktaş	2007–08	Süper Lig	22	0	2	0	3	0	27	0
Beşiktaş	2008–09	Süper Lig	29	0	1	0	3	0	33	0
Beşiktaş	2009–10	Süper Lig	25	0	1	0	4	0	30	0
Beşiktaş	2010–11	Süper Lig	11	0	4	0	1	0	16	0
Beşiktaş	2011–12	Süper Lig	12	0	1	0	5	0	18	0
Beşiktaş	Total		99	0	9	0	16	0	124	0
Career total			432	0	37	0	68	0	537	0

=== International ===
Appearances and goals by national team and year
National team	Year	Apps	Goals
Turkey	1994	2	0
Turkey	1995	10	0
Turkey	1996	10	0
Turkey	1997	7	0
Turkey	1998	5	0
Turkey	1999	7	0
Turkey	2000	9	0
Turkey	2001	10	0
Turkey	2002	13	0
Turkey	2003	13	0
Turkey	2004	12	0
Turkey	2005	4	0
Turkey	2006	10	0
Turkey	2007	2	0
Turkey	2008	3	0
Turkey	2009	1	0
Turkey	2010	0	0
Turkey	2011	0	0
Turkey	2012	1	0
Total		120	0

== Honours ==
Barcelona

- Copa Catalunya: 2003–04

Fenerbahçe

- Süper Lig: 1995–96, 2000–01, 2004–05, 2006–07
- Prime Minister's Cup: 1998
- Atatürk Cup: 1998

Beşiktaş

- Süper Lig: 2008–09
- Turkish Cup: 2008–09, 2010–11

Turkey

- FIFA World Cup third place: 2002
- UEFA European Championship bronze medalist: 2008
- FIFA Confederations Cup third place: 2003

Individual

- Turkish Footballer of the Year: 2001
- FIFA World Cup All Star Team: 2002
- UEFA Team of the Year: 2002
- IFFHS World's Best Goalkeeper of the Year 2002: 3rd
- IFFHS Best Goalkeeper of the 21st Century: 23rd
- FIFA 100

Order

- Turkish State Medal of Distinguished Service

== See also ==
- List of men's footballers with 100 or more international caps

== Bibliography ==
- Haşin, Şahin (2002). Tuana'nın Babası Rüştü (in Turkish). Günizi Yayıncılık. ISBN 9758731041.
