= 1998 FIFA World Cup Group A =

International football tournament

Group A of the 1998 FIFA World Cup was one of eight groups of four teams competing at the 1998 World Cup in France. The first matches were played on 10 June 1998 and the final games took place simultaneously on 23 June 1998. The group consisted of defending champions Brazil, Norway, Scotland and Morocco. Matches took place at six different venues around France. After Brazil beat Scotland and Morocco while Norway drew with Morocco and Scotland, Brazil had qualified as group winners with a game to spare. With ten minutes to go in the final two games, Morocco looked like they would take second place, because they were beating Scotland while Brazil were beating Norway. However, Norway scored two late goals to win and steal the runners up spot from Morocco.

== Standings ==
Pos	Team	Pld	W	D	L	GF	GA	GD	Pts	Qualification
1	Brazil	3	2	0	1	6	3	+3	6	Advance to knockout stage
2	Norway	3	1	2	0	5	4	+1	5	Advance to knockout stage
3	Morocco	3	1	1	1	5	5	0	4	
4	Scotland	3	0	1	2	2	6	−4	1	

Source: FIFA
- Brazil advanced to play Chile (runner-up of Group B) in the round of 16.
- Norway advanced to play Italy (winner of Group B) in the round of 16.

== Matches ==
=== Brazil vs Scotland ===
10 June 1998
17:30 CEST (UTC+2)

Brazil	2–1	Scotland
César Sampaio 5'; Boyd 74' (o.g.)		Collins 38' (pen.)

Stade de France, Saint-Denis
Attendance: 80,000
Referee: José María García-Aranda (Spain)

Brazil	Scotland

GK	1	Cláudio Taffarel
RB	2	Cafu
CB	4	Júnior Baiano
CB	3	Aldair	(yellow card) 45+2'
LB	6	Roberto Carlos
CM	5	César Sampaio	(yellow card) 37'
CM	8	Dunga (c)
AM	7	Giovanni		(substituted off) 46'
AM	10	Rivaldo
CF	9	Ronaldo
CF	20	Bebeto		(substituted off) 72'
Substitutions:
MF	18	Leonardo		(substituted on) 46'
FW	19	Denílson		(substituted on) 72'
Manager:
Mário Zagallo

GK	1	Jim Leighton
CB	4	Colin Calderwood
CB	5	Colin Hendry (c)
CB	3	Tom Boyd
RM	10	Darren Jackson	(yellow card) 25'	(substituted off) 78'
CM	8	Craig Burley
CM	14	Paul Lambert
CM	11	John Collins
LM	22	Christian Dailly		(substituted off) 84'
CF	9	Gordon Durie
CF	7	Kevin Gallacher
Substitutions:
MF	17	Billy McKinlay		(substituted on) 78'
DF	6	Tosh McKinlay		(substituted on) 84'
Manager:
Craig Brown

Assistant referees:
Fernando Tresaco Gracia (Spain)
Jorge Luis Arango (Colombia)
Fourth official:
Gamal Al-Ghandour (Egypt)

=== Morocco vs Norway ===
10 June 1998
21:00 CEST (UTC+2)

Morocco	2–2	Norway
Hadji 37'; Hadda 60'		Chippo 45+1' (o.g.); Eggen 61'

Stade de la Mosson, Montpellier
Attendance: 29,800
Referee: Pirom Un-Prasert (Thailand)

Morocco	Norway

GK	12	Driss Benzekri
RB	2	Abdelilah Saber
CB	4	Youssef Rossi
CB	6	Noureddine Naybet (c)
LB	3	Abdelkrim El Hadrioui
DM	20	Tahar El Khalej		(substituted off) 90'
CM	8	Saïd Chiba	(yellow card) 79'
CM	18	Youssef Chippo		(substituted off) 78'
AM	7	Mustapha Hadji
CF	9	Abdeljalil Hadda		(substituted off) 86'
CF	14	Salaheddine Bassir
Substitutions:
MF	17	Gharib Amzine		(substituted on) 78'
FW	11	Ali El Khattabi		(substituted on) 86'
MF	16	Rachid Azzouzi		(substituted on) 90'
Manager:
(France) Henri Michel

GK	1	Frode Grodås (c)
RB	4	Henning Berg
CB	15	Dan Eggen
CB	3	Ronny Johnsen
LB	5	Stig Inge Bjørnebye
RM	17	Håvard Flo	(substituted off) 72'
CM	8	Øyvind Leonhardsen
CM	10	Kjetil Rekdal
CM	7	Erik Mykland
LM	20	Ole Gunnar Solskjær	(substituted off) 46'
CF	9	Tore André Flo
Substitutions:
MF	21	Vidar Riseth	(substituted on) 46'
MF	6	Ståle Solbakken	(substituted on) 72'
Manager:
Egil Olsen

Assistant referees:
Halim Abdul Hamid (Malaysia)
Nimal Wickramatunge (Sri Lanka)
Fourth official:
Eddie Lennie (Australia)

=== Scotland vs Norway ===
16 June 1998
17:30 CEST (UTC+2)

Scotland	1–1	Norway
Burley 66'		H. Flo 46'

Parc Lescure, Bordeaux
Attendance: 31,800
Referee: László Vágner (Hungary)

Scotland	Norway

GK	1	Jim Leighton
CB	4	Colin Calderwood		(substituted off) 59'
CB	5	Colin Hendry (c)
CB	3	Tom Boyd
RM	10	Darren Jackson	(yellow card) 56'	(substituted off) 61'
CM	8	Craig Burley
CM	14	Paul Lambert
CM	11	John Collins
LM	22	Christian Dailly
CF	9	Gordon Durie	(yellow card) 24'
CF	7	Kevin Gallacher
Substitutions:
DF	16	David Weir		(substituted on) 59'
DF	2	Jackie McNamara		(substituted on) 61'
Manager:
Craig Brown

GK	1	Frode Grodås (c)
RB	4	Henning Berg	(yellow card) 58'	(substituted off) 81'
CB	15	Dan Eggen
CB	3	Ronny Johnsen
LB	5	Stig Inge Bjørnebye
RM	17	Håvard Flo		(substituted off) 60'
CM	22	Roar Strand
CM	10	Kjetil Rekdal	(yellow card) 53'
CM	6	Ståle Solbakken
LM	21	Vidar Riseth		(substituted off) 71'
CF	9	Tore André Flo
Substitutions:
MF	11	Mini Jakobsen		(substituted on) 60'
FW	18	Egil Østenstad		(substituted on) 71'
DF	2	Gunnar Halle		(substituted on) 81'
Manager:
Egil Olsen

Assistant referees:
Evžen Amler (Czech Republic)
Laurent Rausis (Switzerland)
Fourth official:
Abdul Rahman Al-Zeid (Saudi Arabia)

=== Brazil vs Morocco ===
16 June 1998
21:00 CEST (UTC+2)

Brazil	3–0	Morocco
Ronaldo 9'; Rivaldo 45+2'; Bebeto 50'

Stade de la Beaujoire, Nantes
Attendance: 35,500
Referee: Nikolai Levnikov (Russia)

Brazil	Morocco

GK	1	Cláudio Taffarel
RB	2	Cafu
CB	4	Júnior Baiano	(yellow card) 87'
CB	3	Aldair
LB	6	Roberto Carlos
CM	5	César Sampaio	(yellow card) 36'	(substituted off) 68'
CM	8	Dunga (c)
AM	18	Leonardo
AM	10	Rivaldo		(substituted off) 87'
CF	20	Bebeto		(substituted off) 72'
CF	9	Ronaldo
Substitutions:
MF	17	Doriva		(substituted on) 68'
FW	21	Edmundo		(substituted on) 72'
FW	19	Denílson		(substituted on) 87'
Manager:
Mário Zagallo

GK	12	Driss Benzekri
RB	2	Abdelilah Saber		(substituted off) 76'
CB	4	Youssef Rossi
CB	6	Noureddine Naybet (c)
LB	3	Abdelkrim El Hadrioui
DM	20	Tahar El Khalej
CM	8	Saïd Chiba	(yellow card) 64'	(substituted off) 76'
CM	18	Youssef Chippo
AM	7	Mustapha Hadji
CF	9	Abdeljalil Hadda	(yellow card) 32'	(substituted off) 88'
CF	14	Salaheddine Bassir
Substitutions:
DF	15	Lahcen Abrami		(substituted on) 76'
MF	17	Gharib Amzine		(substituted on) 76'
FW	11	Ali El Khattabi		(substituted on) 88'
Manager:
(France) Henri Michel

Assistant referees:
Yuri Dupanov (Belarus)
Mark Warren (England)
Fourth official:
Paul Durkin (England)

=== Scotland vs Morocco ===
23 June 1998
21:00 CEST (UTC+2)

Scotland	0–3	Morocco
		Bassir 23', 85'; Hadda 46'

Stade Geoffroy-Guichard, Saint-Étienne
Attendance: 30,600
Referee: Ali Bujsaim (United Arab Emirates)

Scotland	Morocco

GK	1	Jim Leighton
CB	16	David Weir
CB	5	Colin Hendry (c)
CB	3	Tom Boyd
RM	2	Jackie McNamara		(substituted off) 54'
CM	8	Craig Burley	(red card) 53'
CM	14	Paul Lambert
CM	11	John Collins
LM	22	Christian Dailly
CF	7	Kevin Gallacher	(yellow card) 21'
CF	9	Gordon Durie		(substituted off) 83'
Substitutions:
DF	6	Tosh McKinlay		(substituted on) 54'
FW	20	Scott Booth		(substituted on) 83'
Manager:
Craig Brown

GK	12	Driss Benzekri
RB	2	Abdelilah Saber		(substituted off) 72'
CB	5	Smahi Triki
CB	6	Noureddine Naybet (c)
LB	15	Lahcen Abrami
DM	20	Tahar El Khalej
CM	17	Gharib Amzine		(substituted off) 76'
CM	18	Youssef Chippo	(yellow card) 81'	(substituted off) 87'
AM	7	Mustapha Hadji
CF	9	Abdeljalil Hadda
CF	14	Salaheddine Bassir
Substitutions:
DF	4	Youssef Rossi		(substituted on) 72'
MF	16	Rachid Azzouzi		(substituted on) 76'
MF	19	Jamal Sellami		(substituted on) 87'
Manager:
(France) Henri Michel

Assistant referees:
Luis Torres Zúñiga (Costa Rica)
Lencie Fred (Vanuatu)
Fourth official:
László Vágner (Hungary)

=== Brazil vs Norway ===
23 June 1998
21:00 CEST (UTC+2)

Brazil	1–2	Norway
Bebeto 78'		T. A. Flo 83'; Rekdal 89' (pen.)

Stade Vélodrome, Marseille
Attendance: 55,000
Referee: Esfandiar Baharmast (United States)

Brazil	Norway

GK	1	Cláudio Taffarel
RB	2	Cafu
CB	4	Júnior Baiano
CB	14	Gonçalves
LB	6	Roberto Carlos
CM	18	Leonardo
CM	8	Dunga (c)
AM	10	Rivaldo
AM	19	Denílson
CF	20	Bebeto
CF	9	Ronaldo
Manager:
Mário Zagallo

GK	1	Frode Grodås (c)
RB	4	Henning Berg
CB	15	Dan Eggen
CB	3	Ronny Johnsen
LB	5	Stig Inge Bjørnebye
RM	17	Håvard Flo		(substituted off) 68'
CM	22	Roar Strand		(substituted off) 46'
CM	10	Kjetil Rekdal
CM	8	Øyvind Leonhardsen	(yellow card) 54'
LM	21	Vidar Riseth		(substituted off) 79'
CF	9	Tore André Flo	(yellow card) 61'
Substitutions:
MF	7	Erik Mykland		(substituted on) 46'
FW	20	Ole Gunnar Solskjær		(substituted on) 68'
MF	16	Jostein Flo		(substituted on) 79'
Manager:
Egil Olsen

Assistant referees:
Gennaro Mazzei (Italy)
Dramane Danté (Mali)
Fourth official:
Arturo Brizio Carter (Mexico)

== See also ==
- Brazil at the FIFA World Cup
- Morocco at the FIFA World Cup
- Norway at the FIFA World Cup
- Scotland at the FIFA World Cup
