= UEFA Euro 2000 Group C =

Football tournament group stage

Group C of UEFA Euro 2000 began on 13 June and ended on 21 June 2000. Spain won the group ahead of FR Yugoslavia. Norway and Slovenia were eliminated.

== Teams ==
Draw position	Team	Pot	Method of qualification	Date of qualification	Finals appearance	Last appearance	Previous best performance	UEFA Rankings November 1999 (Note: The UEFA rankings of November 1999 were used for seeding for the final draw.)	FIFA Rankings June 2000
C1	Spain	1	Group 6 winner	8 September 1999	6th	1996	Winners (1964)	1	4
C2	Norway	2	Group 2 winner	8 September 1999	1st	—	Debut	3	7
C3	FR Yugoslavia (Note: From 1960 to 1984, FR Yugoslavia competed as Yugoslavia.)	3	Group 8 winner	9 October 1999	5th (Note: FR Yugoslavia were initially to appear in 1992 (after qualifying as Yugoslavia), but were replaced after being banned by the United Nations from all international sport.)	1984	Runners-up (1960, 1968)	9	10
C4	Slovenia	4	Play-off winner	17 November 1999	1st	—	Debut	36	46

== Standings ==
Pos	Team	Pld	W	D	L	GF	GA	GD	Pts	Qualification
1	Spain	3	2	0	1	6	5	+1	6	Advance to knockout stage
2	FR Yugoslavia	3	1	1	1	7	7	0	4 (Note: Head-to-head result: Norway 0–1 FR Yugoslavia.)	Advance to knockout stage
3	Norway	3	1	1	1	1	1	0	4	
4	Slovenia	3	0	2	1	4	5	−1	2	

Source: UEFA
Rules for classification: Group stage tiebreakers
Notes:

In the quarter-finals,

- The winner of Group C, Spain, advanced to play the runner-up of Group D, France.
- The runner-up of Group C, FR Yugoslavia, advanced to play the winner of Group D, Netherlands.

== Matches ==
=== Spain vs Norway ===
13 June 2000
18:00

Spain	0–1	Norway
	Report	Iversen 65'

Feijenoord Stadion, Rotterdam
Attendance: 41,000
Referee: Gamal Al-Ghandour (Egypt)

Spain	Norway

GK	22	José Francisco Molina
RB	2	Míchel Salgado	(yellow card) 69'
CB	6	Fernando Hierro (c)
CB	18	Paco
LB	3	Agustín Aranzábal
RM	17	Joseba Etxeberria	(yellow card) 17'	(substituted off) 72'
CM	4	Pep Guardiola
CM	21	Juan Carlos Valerón		(substituted off) 80'
LM	8	Fran		(substituted off) 72'
CF	10	Raúl
CF	20	Ismael Urzaiz
Substitutions:
MF	16	Gaizka Mendieta		(substituted on) 72'
FW	11	Alfonso		(substituted on) 72'
MF	7	Iván Helguera		(substituted on) 80'
Manager:
José Antonio Camacho

GK	1	Thomas Myhre
RB	14	Vegard Heggem
CB	4	Henning Berg (c)		(substituted off) 59'
CB	3	Bjørn Otto Bragstad
LB	2	André Bergdølmo	(yellow card) 32'
CM	19	Eirik Bakke
CM	11	Bent Skammelsrud
CM	7	Erik Mykland
RF	18	Steffen Iversen		(substituted off) 89'
CF	9	Tore André Flo		(substituted off) 71'
LF	20	Ole Gunnar Solskjær
Substitutions:
DF	16	Dan Eggen		(substituted on) 59'
FW	17	John Carew		(substituted on) 71'
MF	21	Vidar Riseth		(substituted on) 89'
Manager:
Nils Johan Semb

Man of the Match:
Erik Mykland (Norway)

Assistant referees:
Kurt Ertl (Germany)
Igor Šramka (Slovakia)
Fourth official:
Dick Jol (Netherlands)

=== FR Yugoslavia vs Slovenia ===
13 June 2000
20:45

FR Yugoslavia	3–3	Slovenia
Milošević 67', 73'; Drulović 70'	Report	Zahovič 23', 57'; Pavlin 52'

Stade du Pays de Charleroi, Charleroi
Attendance: 18,500
Referee: Vítor Melo Pereira (Portugal)

FR Yugoslavia	Slovenia

GK	22	Ivica Kralj
RB	2	Ivan Dudić
CB	5	Miroslav Đukić
CB	11	Siniša Mihajlović	(yellow card) 56' (yellow-red card) 60'
LB	21	Albert Nađ
RM	6	Dejan Stanković		(substituted off) 36'
CM	7	Vladimir Jugović
CM	4	Slaviša Jokanović
LM	17	Ljubinko Drulović
CF	8	Predrag Mijatović (c)		(substituted off) 82'
CF	18	Darko Kovačević		(substituted off) 52'
Substitutions:
MF	10	Dragan Stojković		(substituted on) 36'
FW	9	Savo Milošević		(substituted on) 52'
FW	20	Mateja Kežman		(substituted on) 82'
Manager:
Vujadin Boškov

GK	12	Mladen Dabanovič
CB	3	Željko Milinovič
CB	5	Marinko Galič
CB	4	Darko Milanič (c)	(yellow card) 32'
RM	7	Džoni Novak
CM	8	Aleš Čeh
CM	11	Miran Pavlin		(substituted off) 74'
LM	19	Amir Karić		(substituted off) 78'
AM	10	Zlatko Zahovič
CF	13	Mladen Rudonja
CF	9	Sašo Udovič		(substituted off) 64'
Substitutions:
MF	18	Milenko Ačimovič		(substituted on) 64'
MF	21	Zoran Pavlović		(substituted on) 74'
FW	20	Milan Osterc		(substituted on) 78'
Manager:
Srečko Katanec

Man of the Match:
Zlatko Zahovič (Slovenia)

Assistant referees:
Nicolae Grigorescu (Romania)
Dramane Dante (Mali)
Fourth official:
Graham Poll (England)

=== Slovenia vs Spain ===
18 June 2000
18:00

Slovenia	1–2	Spain
Zahovič 59'	Report	Raúl 4'; Etxeberria 60'

Amsterdam Arena, Amsterdam
Attendance: 51,300
Referee: Markus Merk (Germany)

Slovenia	Spain

GK	12	Mladen Dabanovič
CB	3	Željko Milinovič
CB	5	Marinko Galič
CB	4	Darko Milanič (c)	(yellow card) 24'	(substituted off) 68'
RM	7	Džoni Novak	(yellow card) 53'
CM	8	Aleš Čeh
CM	11	Miran Pavlin	(yellow card) 11'	(substituted off) 82'
LM	19	Amir Karić	(yellow card) 85'
AM	10	Zlatko Zahovič
CF	13	Mladen Rudonja
CF	9	Sašo Udovič		(substituted off) 46'
Substitutions:
FW	20	Milan Osterc		(substituted on) 46'
DF	6	Aleksander Knavs		(substituted on) 68'
MF	18	Milenko Ačimovič		(substituted on) 82'
Manager:
Srečko Katanec

GK	1	Santiago Cañizares
RB	2	Míchel Salgado
CB	6	Fernando Hierro (c)
CB	5	Abelardo
LB	3	Agustín Aranzábal	(yellow card) 62'
RM	17	Joseba Etxeberria
CM	4	Pep Guardiola		(substituted off) 81'
CM	21	Juan Carlos Valerón		(substituted off) 89'
LM	16	Gaizka Mendieta
CF	10	Raúl
CF	11	Alfonso		(substituted off) 71'
Substitutions:
FW	20	Ismael Urzaiz		(substituted on) 71'
MF	7	Iván Helguera	(yellow card) 82'	(substituted on) 81'
MF	15	Vicente Engonga		(substituted on) 89'
Manager:
José Antonio Camacho

Man of the Match:
Raúl (Spain)

Assistant referees:
Kurt Ertl (Germany)
Jaap Pool (Netherlands)
Fourth official:
Anders Frisk (Sweden)

=== Norway vs FR Yugoslavia ===
18 June 2000
20:45

Norway	0–1	FR Yugoslavia
	Report	Milošević 8'

Stade Maurice Dufrasne, Liège
Attendance: 28,750
Referee: Hugh Dallas (Scotland)

Norway	FR Yugoslavia

GK	1	Thomas Myhre
RB	14	Vegard Heggem		(substituted off) 35'
CB	16	Dan Eggen
CB	3	Bjørn Otto Bragstad
LB	2	André Bergdølmo
CM	19	Eirik Bakke	(yellow card) 66'	(substituted off) 76'
CM	11	Bent Skammelsrud (c)
CM	7	Erik Mykland	(yellow card) 31'
RF	18	Steffen Iversen		(substituted off) 71'
CF	9	Tore André Flo
LF	20	Ole Gunnar Solskjær
Substitutions:
DF	22	Stig Inge Bjørnebye		(substituted on) 35'
FW	17	John Carew		(substituted on) 71'
MF	6	Roar Strand		(substituted on) 76'
Manager:
Nils Johan Semb

GK	22	Ivica Kralj
RB	13	Slobodan Komljenović
CB	5	Miroslav Đukić
CB	14	Niša Saveljić
LB	3	Goran Đorović
RM	10	Dragan Stojković (c)		(substituted off) 84'
CM	7	Vladimir Jugović	(yellow card) 71'
CM	4	Slaviša Jokanović	(yellow card) 28'	(substituted off) 89'
LM	17	Ljubinko Drulović	(yellow card) 81'
CF	8	Predrag Mijatović		(substituted off) 87'
CF	9	Savo Milošević
Substitutions:
MF	21	Albert Nađ	(yellow card) 90+2'	(substituted on) 84'
FW	20	Mateja Kežman	(red card) 88'	(substituted on) 87'
MF	16	Dejan Govedarica	(substituted on) 89'
Manager:
Vujadin Boškov

Man of the Match:
Dragan Stojković (FR Yugoslavia)

Assistant referees:
Eddie Foley (Republic of Ireland)
Roland Van Nylen (Belgium)
Fourth official:
Kyros Vassaras (Greece)

=== FR Yugoslavia vs Spain ===
21 June 2000
18:00

FR Yugoslavia	3–4	Spain
Milošević 30'; Govedarica 50'; Komljenović 75'	Report	Alfonso 38', 90+5'; Munitis 51'; Mendieta 90+4' (pen.)

Jan Breydel Stadium, Bruges
Attendance: 26,611
Referee: Gilles Veissière (France)

FR Yugoslavia	Spain

GK	22	Ivica Kralj
RB	13	Slobodan Komljenović	(yellow card) 27'
CB	5	Miroslav Đukić
CB	11	Siniša Mihajlović
LB	3	Goran Đorović		(substituted off) 13'
RM	10	Dragan Stojković (c)	(yellow card) 56'	(substituted off) 68'
CM	7	Vladimir Jugović		(substituted off) 46'
CM	4	Slaviša Jokanović	(red card) 63'
LM	17	Ljubinko Drulović
CF	8	Predrag Mijatović
CF	9	Savo Milošević
Substitutions:
MF	19	Jovan Stanković	(yellow card) 45'	(substituted on) 13'
MF	16	Dejan Govedarica		(substituted on) 46'
DF	14	Niša Saveljić	(yellow card) 87'	(substituted on) 68'
Manager:
Vujadin Boškov

GK	1	Santiago Cañizares
RB	2	Míchel Salgado		(substituted off) 46'
CB	5	Abelardo (c)
CB	18	Paco		(substituted off) 64'
LB	12	Sergi	(yellow card) 62'
RM	16	Gaizka Mendieta
CM	4	Pep Guardiola
CM	7	Iván Helguera
LM	8	Fran		(substituted off) 22'
CF	10	Raúl
CF	11	Alfonso
Substitutions:
FW	17	Joseba Etxeberria		(substituted on) 22'
FW	9	Pedro Munitis		(substituted on) 46'
FW	20	Ismael Urzaiz		(substituted on) 64'
Manager:
José Antonio Camacho

Man of the Match:
Pep Guardiola (Spain)

Assistant referees:
Jacques Poudevigne (France)
Turgay Güdü (Turkey)
Fourth official:
Michel Piraux (Belgium)

=== Slovenia vs Norway ===
21 June 2000
18:00

Slovenia	0–0	Norway
	Report

GelreDome, Arnhem
Attendance: 21,000
Referee: Graham Poll (England)

Slovenia	Norway

GK	12	Mladen Dabanovič
CB	3	Željko Milinovič
CB	5	Marinko Galič		(substituted off) 83'
CB	6	Aleksander Knavs
RM	7	Džoni Novak
CM	8	Aleš Čeh (c)
CM	11	Miran Pavlin	(yellow card) 44'
LM	19	Amir Karić
AM	10	Zlatko Zahovič
CF	13	Mladen Rudonja
CF	17	Ermin Šiljak		(substituted off) 86'
Substitutions:
MF	18	Milenko Ačimovič		(substituted on) 83'
FW	20	Milan Osterc		(substituted on) 86'
Manager:
Srečko Katanec

GK	1	Thomas Myhre
RB	2	André Bergdølmo
CB	16	Dan Eggen
CB	3	Bjørn Otto Bragstad
LB	22	Stig Inge Bjørnebye
RM	18	Steffen Iversen
CM	7	Erik Mykland	(yellow card) 24'
CM	8	Ståle Solbakken (c)
LM	20	Ole Gunnar Solskjær	(yellow card) 59'
CF	17	John Carew		(substituted off) 61'
CF	9	Tore André Flo
Substitutions:
MF	19	Eirik Bakke		(substituted on) 61'	(substituted off) 82'
MF	6	Roar Strand			(substituted on) 82'
Manager:
Nils Johan Semb

Man of the Match:
Erik Mykland (Norway)

Assistant referees:
Philip Sharp (England)
Emanuel Zammit (Malta)
Fourth official:
Vítor Melo Pereira (Portugal)

== See also ==
- Norway at the UEFA European Championship
- Serbia at the UEFA European Championship
- Slovenia at the UEFA European Championship
- Spain at the UEFA European Championship
