= Norway at the FIFA World Cup =

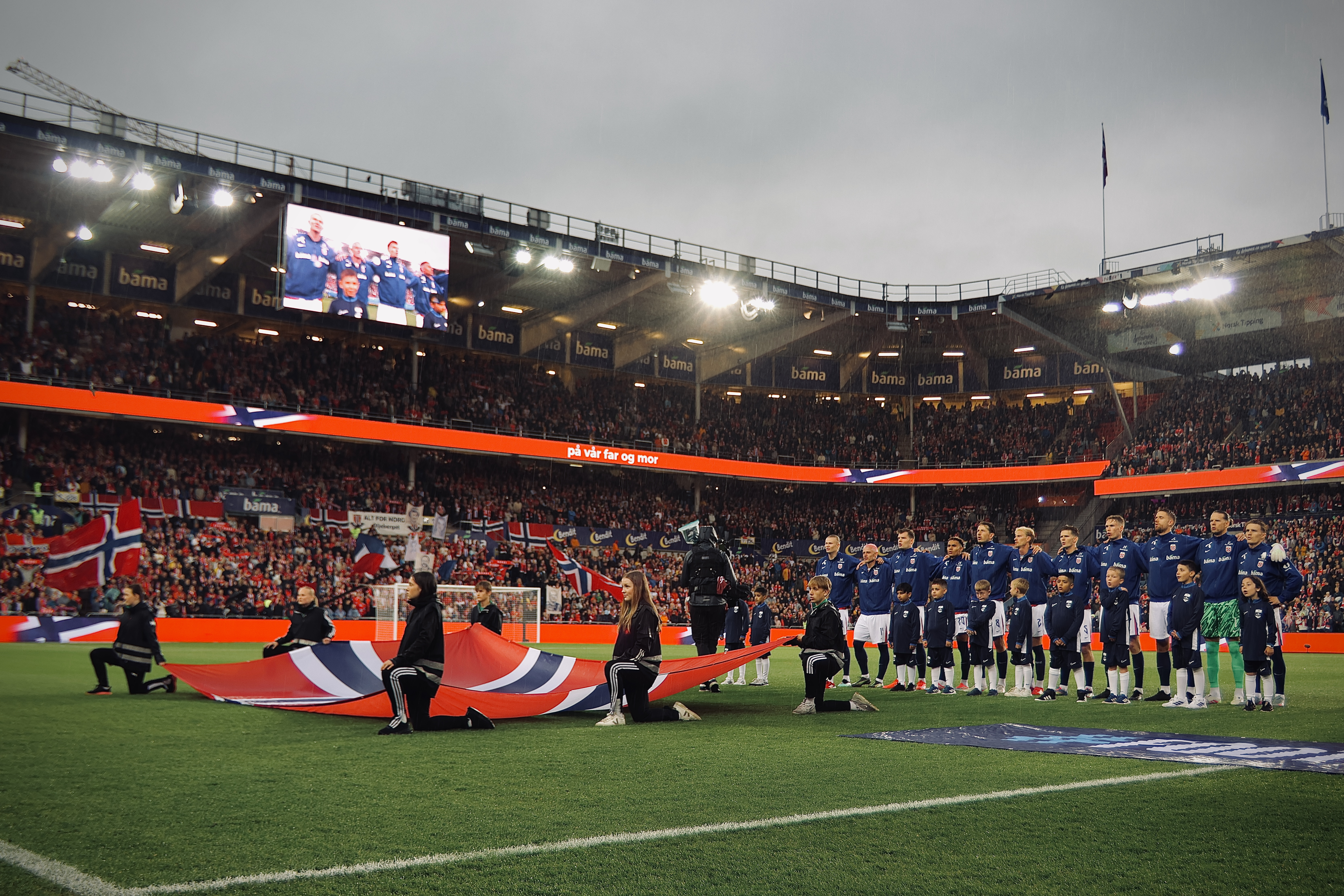
Norway against Italy, during the qualification phase of the 2026 World Cup in June 2025.

Norway has participated in the qualification for 18 FIFA World Cup tournaments and have appeared in the main tournament four times, in 1938, 1994, 1998, and 2026. In 2026, the team underwent their deepest run at a World Cup, advancing to the quarter-finals for the first time in their history at the 2026 World Cup.

== Background ==
Norway's two appearances in the 1990s were built on the direct style of manager Egil Olsen, who favoured long passes, compact defending and rapid counter-attacks. Drawing on the goal-scoring analysis of statistician Charles Reep, the approach carried Norway to second in the FIFA World Rankings in the mid-1990s.

The return in 2026 ended a 28-year absence, the country's first appearance since 1998. Led by Erling Haaland, who scored 16 goals in UEFA qualifying, Norway secured their place with a 4–1 win over Italy in Milan.

== Record at the FIFA World Cup ==
=== Overall record ===
| Year | Round | Position | Pld | W | D* | L | GF | GA |
|---|---|---|---|---|---|---|---|---|
| (Uruguay) 1930 | Did not enter | | | | | | | |
| (Italy) 1934 | Did not enter | | | | | | | |
| (France) 1938 | Round of 16 | 12th | 1 | 0 | 0 | 1 | 1 | 2 |
| (Brazil) 1950 | Did not enter | | | | | | | |
| (Switzerland) 1954 | Did not qualify | | | | | | | |
| (Sweden) 1958 | Did not qualify | | | | | | | |
| (Chile) 1962 | Did not qualify | | | | | | | |
| (England) 1966 | Did not qualify | | | | | | | |
| (Mexico) 1970 | Did not qualify | | | | | | | |
| (West Germany) 1974 | Did not qualify | | | | | | | |
| (Argentina) 1978 | Did not qualify | | | | | | | |
| (Spain) 1982 | Did not qualify | | | | | | | |
| (Mexico) 1986 | Did not qualify | | | | | | | |
| (Italy) 1990 | Did not qualify | | | | | | | |
| (United States) 1994 | Group stage | 17th | 3 | 1 | 1 | 1 | 1 | 1 |
| (France) 1998 | Round of 16 | 15th | 4 | 1 | 2 | 1 | 5 | 5 |
| (South Korea) (Japan) 2002 | Did not qualify | | | | | | | |
| (Germany) 2006 | Did not qualify | | | | | | | |
| (South Africa) 2010 | Did not qualify | | | | | | | |
| (Brazil) 2014 | Did not qualify | | | | | | | |
| (Russia) 2018 | Did not qualify | | | | | | | |
| (Qatar) 2022 | Did not qualify | | | | | | | |
| (Canada) (Mexico) (United States) 2026 | Quarter-finals | 5th | 6 | 4 | 0 | 2 | 13 | 11 |
| (Morocco) (Portugal) (Spain) 2030 | To be determined | | | | | | | |
| (Saudi Arabia) 2034 | To be determined | | | | | | | |
| Total: 4/23 | Quarter-finals | 5th | 14 | 6 | 3 | 5 | 20 | 19 |

*Draws include knockout matches decided via penalty shoot-out

=== By match ===
| World Cup | Round | Opponent | Score | Result | Venue | Norway scorers |
|---|---|---|---|---|---|---|
| 1938 | Round of 16 | Italy | 1–2 (a.e.t.) | L | Marseille | A. Brustad 83' |
| 1994 | Group stage | Mexico | 1–0 | W | Washington, D.C. | K. Rekdal 84' |
| 1994 | Group stage | Italy | 0–1 | L | East Rutherford | — |
| 1994 | Group stage | Republic of Ireland | 0–0 | D | East Rutherford | — |
| 1998 | Group stage | Morocco | 2–2 | D | Montpellier | Y. Chippo 45+1' (o.g.), D. Eggen 61' |
| 1998 | Group stage | Scotland | 1–1 | D | Bordeaux | H. Flo 46' |
| 1998 | Group stage | Brazil | 2–1 | W | Marseille | T.A. Flo 83', K. Rekdal 89' (pen.) |
| 1998 | Round of 16 | Italy | 0–1 | L | Marseille | — |
| 2026 | Group stage | Iraq | 4–1 | W | Foxborough | E. Haaland 29', 43', L. Østigård 76', A. Hussein 90+6' (o.g.) |
| 2026 | Group stage | Senegal | 3–2 | W | East Rutherford | M. Pedersen 43', E. Haaland 48', 58' |
| 2026 | Group stage | France | 1–4 | L | Foxborough | T. Aasgaard 21' |
| 2026 | Round of 32 | Ivory Coast | 2–1 | W | Arlington | A. Nusa 39', E. Haaland 86' |
| 2026 | Round of 16 | Brazil | 2–1 | W | East Rutherford | E. Haaland 79', 90' |
| 2026 | Quarter-finals | England | 1–2 (a.e.t.) | L | Miami Gardens | A. Schjelderup 36' |

=== Record by opponent ===
FIFA World Cup matches (by team)
| Opponent | Wins | Draws | Losses | Total | Goals Scored | Goals Conceded |
|---|---|---|---|---|---|---|
| Brazil | 2 | 0 | 0 | 2 | 4 | 2 |
| England | 0 | 0 | 1 | 1 | 1 | 2 |
| France | 0 | 0 | 1 | 1 | 1 | 4 |
| Iraq | 1 | 0 | 0 | 1 | 4 | 1 |
| Italy | 0 | 0 | 3 | 3 | 1 | 4 |
| Ivory Coast | 1 | 0 | 0 | 1 | 2 | 1 |
| Mexico | 1 | 0 | 0 | 1 | 1 | 0 |
| Morocco | 0 | 1 | 0 | 1 | 2 | 2 |
| Republic of Ireland | 0 | 1 | 0 | 1 | 0 | 0 |
| Scotland | 0 | 1 | 0 | 1 | 1 | 1 |
| Senegal | 1 | 0 | 0 | 1 | 3 | 2 |

== Match records ==
=== 1938 FIFA World Cup ===
==== First round ====
| 5 June 1938 | Italy | 2–1 (a.e.t.) | Norway | Marseille, France |
| 17:00 (WEST) | Ferraris 2'; Piola 94' | (1–1, 1–0); Report (FIFA) | 83' Brustad | Stadium: Stade Vélodrome; Attendance: 19,000; Referee: Alois Beranek (Austria) |

=== 1994 FIFA World Cup ===
==== Group stage ====
| 19 June 1994 | Norway | 1–0 | Mexico | (United States) Washington, D.C., USA |
| 16:00 (EDT) | Rekdal 84' | (0–0); Report (FIFA) | | Stadium: RFK Stadium; Attendance: 52,395; Referee: Sandor Puhl (Hungary) |

| 23 June 1994 | Italy | 1–0 | Norway | (United States) East Rutherford, NJ, USA |
| 16:00 (EDT) | Pagliuca (red card) 21'; D. Baggio 69' | (0–0); Report (FIFA) | | Stadium: Giants Stadium; Attendance: 74,624; Referee: Hellmut Krug (Germany) |

| 28 June 1994 | Republic of Ireland | 0–0 | Norway | (United States) East Rutherford, NJ, USA |
| 12:30 (EDT) | | Report (FIFA) | | Stadium: Giants Stadium; Attendance: 72,404; Referee: José Torres Cadena (Colombia) |

=== 1998 FIFA World Cup ===
==== Group stage ====
| 10 June 1998 | Morocco | 2–2 | Norway | Montpellier, France |
| 21:00 CET | Hadji 37'; Hadda 60' | (1–1); Report (FIFA) | 45+1' (o.g.) Chippo; 61' Eggen | Stadium: Stade de la Mosson; Attendance: 29,800; Referee: Pirom Un-Prasert (Thailand) |

| 16 June 1998 | Scotland | 1–1 | Norway | Bordeaux, France |
| 17:30 CET | Burley 66' | (0–0); Report (FIFA) | 46' H. Flo | Stadium: Stade du Parc Lescure; Attendance: 31,800; Referee: László Vágner (Hungary) |

| 23 June 1998 | Brazil | 1–2 | Norway | Marseille, France |
| 21:00 CET | Bebeto 78' | (0–0); Report (FIFA) | 83' T.A. Flo; 89' (pen.) Rekdal | Stadium: Stade Vélodrome; Attendance: 55,000; Referee: Esse Baharmast (United States) |

==== Round of 16 ====
| 27 June 1998 | Italy | 1–0 | Norway | Marseille, France |
| 16:30 CET | Vieri 18' | (1–0); Report (FIFA) | | Stadium: Stade Vélodrome; Attendance: 55,000; Referee: Bernd Heynemann (Germany) |

=== 2026 FIFA World Cup ===
==== Group stage ====
| Pos | Team | Pld | W | D | L | GF | GA | GD | Pts | Qualification |
|---|---|---|---|---|---|---|---|---|---|---|
| 1 | France | 3 | 3 | 0 | 0 | 10 | 2 | +8 | 9 | Advance to knockout stage |
| 2 | Norway | 3 | 2 | 0 | 1 | 8 | 7 | +1 | 6 | Advance to knockout stage |
| 3 | Senegal | 3 | 1 | 0 | 2 | 8 | 6 | +2 | 3 | Advance to knockout stage |
| 4 | Iraq | 3 | 0 | 0 | 3 | 1 | 12 | −11 | 0 | |

Source: FIFA
Rules for classification: Group stage tiebreakers
June 16, 2026
6:00 p.m. UTC−4

| Iraq | 1–4 | Norway |
|---|---|---|
| Hussein 39' | (Note: "Iraq vs Norway | First Stage | FIFA World Cup 2026". FIFA. Retrieved June 16, 2026.; "Match Report – Group I – Iraq v. Norway". FIFA. Retrieved June 17, 2026.; "Post match summary report – Group I – Iraq v. Norway". FIFA. June 16, 2026. Retrieved June 17, 2026.) | Haaland 29', 43'; Østigård 76'; Hussein 90+6' (o.g.) |

Gillette Stadium, Foxborough
Attendance: 63,106
Referee: Pierre Atcho (Gabon)

June 22, 2026
8:00 p.m. UTC−4

| Norway | 3–2 | Senegal |
|---|---|---|
| Pedersen 43'; Haaland 48', 58' | (Note: "Norway vs Senegal | First Stage | FIFA World Cup 2026". FIFA. Retrieved June 23, 2026.; "Match Report – Group I – Norway v. Senegal". FIFA. June 23, 2026. Retrieved June 23, 2026.; "Post match summary report – Group I – Norway v. Senegal". FIFA. June 23, 2026. Retrieved June 23, 2026.) | I. Sarr 53', 90+3' |

MetLife Stadium, East Rutherford
Attendance: 80,663
Referee: Wilton Sampaio (Brazil)

June 26, 2026
3:00 p.m. UTC−4

| Norway | 1–4 | France |
|---|---|---|
| Aasgaard 21' | (Note: "Norway vs France | First Stage | FIFA World Cup 2026". FIFA. Retrieved June 26, 2026.; "Match Report – Group I – Norway v. France". FIFA. June 26, 2026. Retrieved June 26, 2026.; "Post match summary report – Group I – Norway v. France". FIFA. June 26, 2026. Retrieved June 27, 2026.) | Dembélé 7', 20', 32'; Doué 90+4' |

Gillette Stadium, Foxborough
Attendance: 64,146
Referee: Michael Oliver (England)

==== Knockout stage ====
Round of 32

June 30, 2026
12:00 p.m. UTC−5

| Ivory Coast | 1–2 | Norway |
|---|---|---|
| Diallo 74' | (Note: "Côte d'Ivoire vs Norway | Round of 32 | FIFA World Cup 2026". FIFA. Retrieved June 30, 2026.; "Match Report – Round of 32 – Côte d'Ivoire v. Norway". FIFA. June 30, 2026. Retrieved June 30, 2026.; "Post match summary report – Round of 32 – Côte d'Ivoire vs. Norway". FIFA. July 1, 2026. Retrieved July 1, 2026.) | Nusa 39'; Haaland 86' |

AT&T Stadium, Arlington
Attendance: 69,665
Referee: Jesús Valenzuela (Venezuela)

Round of 16

July 5, 2026
4:00 p.m. UTC−4

| Brazil | 1–2 | Norway |
|---|---|---|
| Neymar 90+10' (pen.) | (Note: "Brazil vs Norway | Round of 16 | FIFA World Cup 2026". FIFA. Retrieved July 5, 2026.; "Match Report – Round of 16 – Brazil v. Norway". FIFA. July 5, 2026. Retrieved July 5, 2026.; "Post match summary report – Round of 16 – Brazil v. Norway". FIFA. July 5, 2026. Retrieved July 6, 2026.) | Haaland 79', 90' |

MetLife Stadium, East Rutherford
Attendance: 80,663
Referee: Ismail Elfath (United States)

Quarter-finals

July 11, 2026
5:00 p.m. UTC−4

| Norway | 1–2 (a.e.t.) | England |
|---|---|---|
| Schjelderup 36' | (Note: "Norway vs England | Quarter-final | FIFA World Cup 2026". FIFA. Retrieved July 11, 2026.; "Match Report – Quarter-final – Norway v. England". FIFA. July 11, 2026. Retrieved July 11, 2026.; "Post match summary report – Quarter-final – Norway v. England". FIFA. July 11, 2026. Retrieved July 12, 2026.) | Bellingham 45+2', 93' |

Hard Rock Stadium, Miami Gardens
Attendance: 64,478
Referee: Clément Turpin (France)

== Player records ==
=== Most appearances ===
| Rank | Player | Matches | World Cups |
|---|---|---|---|
| 1 | Henning Berg | 7 | 1994 and 1998 |
| 1 | Stig Inge Bjørnebye | 7 | 1994 and 1998 |
| 1 | Kjetil Rekdal | 7 | 1994 and 1998 |
| 4 | Øyvind Leonhardsen | 6 | 1994 and 1998 |
| 4 | Erik Mykland | 6 | 1994 and 1998 |
| 4 | Fredrik Aursnes | 6 | 2026 |
| 4 | Patrick Berg | 6 | 2026 |
| 4 | Oscar Bobb | 6 | 2026 |
| 4 | Antonio Nusa | 6 | 2026 |
| 4 | Andreas Schjelderup | 6 | 2026 |

=== Goalscorers ===
| Player | Goals | 1938 | 1994 | 1998 | 2026 |
|---|---|---|---|---|---|
| Erling Haaland | 7 | | | | 7 |
| Kjetil Rekdal | 2 | | 1 | 1 | |
| Arne Brustad | 1 | 1 | | | |
| Dan Eggen | 1 | | | 1 | |
| Håvard Flo | 1 | | | 1 | |
| Tore André Flo | 1 | | | 1 | |
| Leo Østigård | 1 | | | | 1 |
| Marcus Holmgren Pedersen | 1 | | | | 1 |
| Thelo Aasgaard | 1 | | | | 1 |
| Antonio Nusa | 1 | | | | 1 |
| Andreas Schjelderup | 1 | | | | 1 |
| Own goals | 2 | | | 1 | 1 |
| Total | 20 | 1 | 1 | 5 | 13 |

== See also ==
- Norway at the UEFA European Championship
