= Norway at the UEFA European Championship =

International football delegation

Norway qualified for one UEFA European Championship so far (as of 2024), the Euro 2000 tournament. During the qualifiers, they achieved direct qualification by ending first in their group with Slovenia, Greece, Latvia, Albania and Georgia.

At the championship in Belgium and the Netherlands, Norway was drawn into group C together with Spain, Yugoslavia and Slovenia. With their last group match against Slovenia ending on 0–0 and the simultaneously played other group match Yugoslavia vs. Spain standing 3–2 after the regular playing time, it appeared Norway (with 4 points) would finish second in their group, ahead of Spain (3 points). However, after an unlikely 3–4 comeback from Spain during the extra time Norway saw themselves eliminated. Norway coach Nils Johan Semb worded this as his team having been "at 12 seconds from the quarter-finals".

== Euro 2000 ==
=== Group stage ===
Pos	Team	Pld	W	D	L	GF	GA	GD	Pts	Qualification
1	Spain	3	2	0	1	6	5	+1	6	Advance to knockout stage
2	FR Yugoslavia	3	1	1	1	7	7	0	4 (Note: Head-to-head result: Norway 0–1 FR Yugoslavia.)	Advance to knockout stage
3	Norway	3	1	1	1	1	1	0	4	
4	Slovenia	3	0	2	1	4	5	−1	2	

Source: UEFA
Rules for classification: Group stage tiebreakers
Notes:
13 June 2000
18:00

Spain	0–1	Norway
	Report	Iversen 65'

Feijenoord Stadion, Rotterdam
Attendance: 41,000
Referee: Gamal Al-Ghandour (Egypt)

18 June 2000
20:45

Norway	0–1	FR Yugoslavia
	Report	Milošević 8'

Stade Maurice Dufrasne, Liège
Attendance: 28,750
Referee: Hugh Dallas (Scotland)

21 June 2000
18:00

Slovenia	0–0	Norway
	Report

GelreDome, Arnhem
Attendance: 21,000
Referee: Graham Poll (England)

== Overall record ==
Year	Round	Pld	W	D*	L	GF	GA
(France) 1960	Did not qualify						
(Spain) 1964	Did not qualify						
(Italy) 1968	Did not qualify						
(Belgium) 1972	Did not qualify						
(Socialist Federal Republic of Yugoslavia) 1976	Did not qualify						
(Italy) 1980	Did not qualify						
(France) 1984	Did not qualify						
(West Germany) 1988	Did not qualify						
(Sweden) 1992	Did not qualify						
(England) 1996	Did not qualify						
(Belgium) (Netherlands) 2000	Group stage	3	1	1	1	1	1
(Portugal) 2004	Did not qualify						
(Austria) (Switzerland) 2008	Did not qualify						
(Poland) (Ukraine) 2012	Did not qualify						
(France) 2016	Did not qualify						
(Europe) 2020	Did not qualify						
(Germany) 2024	Did not qualify						
(United Kingdom) (Republic of Ireland) 2028	To be determined						
(Italy) (Turkey) 2032	To be determined						
Total	1/17	3	1	1	1	1	1

== Player records ==
=== Most appearances ===
Rank	Player	Matches	Years
1	Eirik Bakke	3	2000
1	André Bergdølmo	3	2000
1	Bjørn Otto Bragstad	3	2000
1	John Carew	3	2000
1	Dan Eggen	3	2000
1	Tore André Flo	3	2000
1	Steffen Iversen	3	2000
1	Thomas Myhre	3	2000
1	Erik Mykland	3	2000
1	Ole Gunnar Solskjær	3	2000
11	Stig Inge Bjørnebye	2	2000
11	Vegard Heggem	2	2000
11	Bent Skammelsrud	2	2000
11	Roar Strand	2	2000

=== Goalscorers ===
Rank	Player	Goals	Years
1	Steffen Iversen	1	2000

== See also ==
- Norway at the FIFA World Cup
