= List of Norway national football team managers =

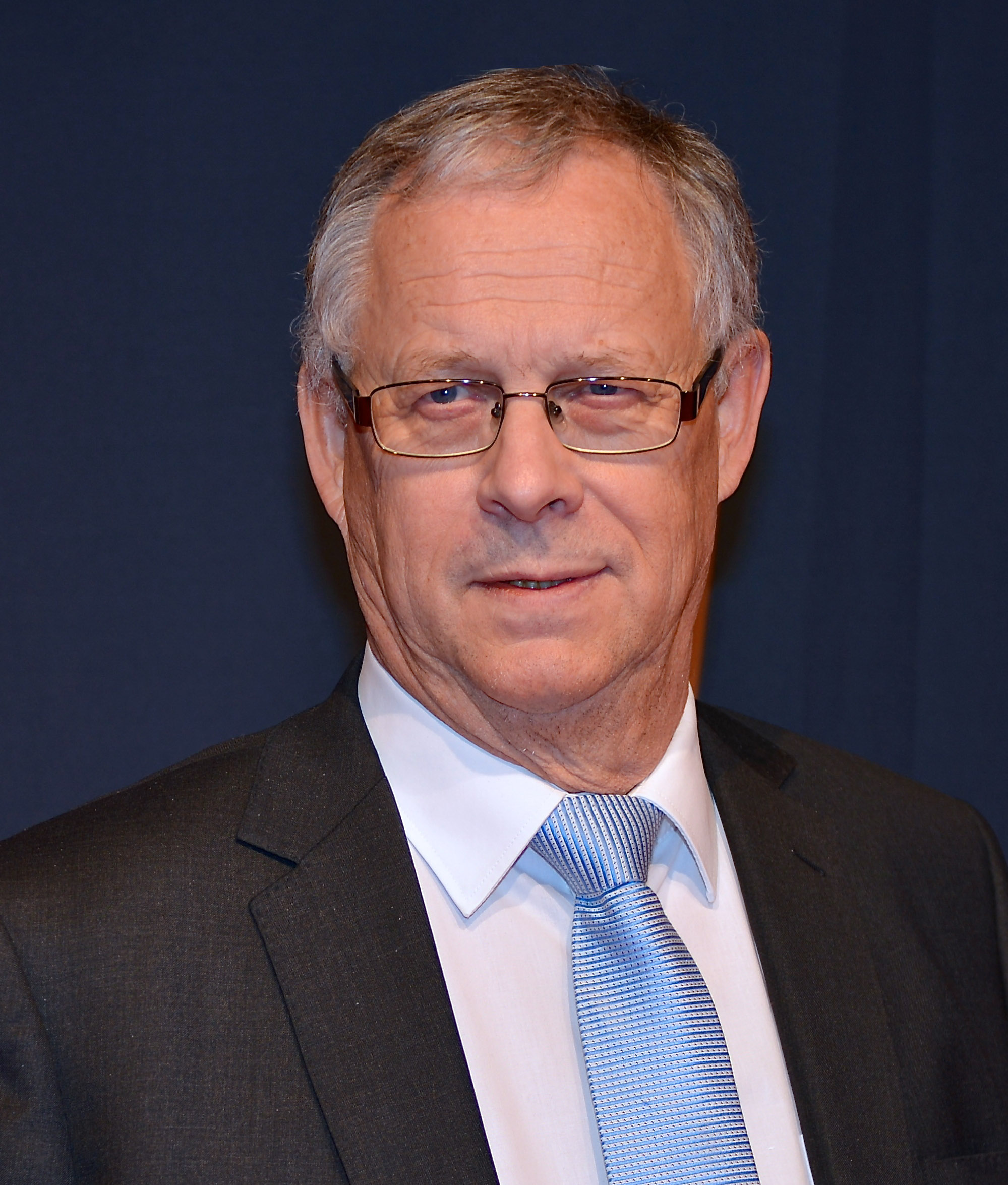
Lars Lagerbäck, the former Norway national football team manager

The role of a Norway national football team manager was first established in 1953 with the appointment of Austrian Willibald Hahn. Prior to 1953, the team was selected by a selection committee, which also continued to select the team until 1969.

Nineteen men have occupied the post since its inception; one of those were in a short-term caretaker manager role: Ragnar Larsen (one game in his first spell). Egil Olsen is the only manager who has qualified for a World Cup; achieving a Round of 16-appearance at the 1998 World Cup as the best result. Nils Johan Semb is the only manager who has qualified for a European Championship. Ragnar Larsen became the first Norwegian manager when he led the team as a caretaker in a match in 1958. His successor, Kristian Henriksen was the first Norwegian to manage the team on a permanent basis. Wilhelm Kment, Larsen (one as caretaker) and Olsen managed Norway on more than one occasion, all with two spells.

== Statistical summary ==
The following table provides a summary of the complete record of each Norway manager including their progress in both the World Cup and the European Championship. Prior to 1953, the squad was selected by a selection committee, which also continued to select the team until 1969.

Statistics correct as of 18 November 2019

Image	Manager	Tenure	P	W	D	L	Win %	Competitions
	Willibald Hahn	1953–1955	26	7	7	12	26.9	1954 World Cup – failed to qualify
	Ron Lewin	1956–1957	17	5	4	8	29.4	1958 World Cup – failed to qualify
	Edmund Majowski	1958	5	3	1	1	60.0	—N/a
	Ragnar Larsen (caretaker)	1958	1	0	0	1	0.0	—N/a
	Kristian Henriksen	1959	10	3	0	7	30.0	1960 European Nations' Cup – failed to qualify
	Wilhelm Kment	1960–1962	20	6	2	12	30.0	1962 World Cup – failed to qualify
	Ragnar Larsen	1962–1966	33	11	7	15	33.3	1964 European Nations' Cup – failed to qualify 1966 World Cup – failed to qualify
	Wilhelm Kment	1967–1969	25	9	3	13	36.0	Euro 1968 – failed to qualify 1970 World Cup – failed to qualify
	Øivind Johannessen	1970–1971	17	4	2	11	23.5	—N/a
	George Curtis	1972–1974	17	3	2	12	17.6	Euro 1972 – failed to qualify 1974 World Cup – failed to qualify
	Kjell Schou-Andreassen and Nils Arne Eggen	1974–1977	27	6	4	17	22.2	Euro 1976 – failed to qualify 1978 World Cup – failed to qualify
	Tor Røste Fossen	1978–1987	94	28	28	38	29.8	Euro 1980 – failed to qualify 1982 World Cup – failed to qualify Euro 1984 – failed to qualify 1986 World Cup – failed to qualify
	Kjell Schou-Andreassen and Nils Arne Eggen (Note: Only Olympic team's qualification to the 1988 Summer Olympics. Norway did not qualify.)	1986–1987	8	0	5	3	0.0	—N/a
	Tord Grip	1987–1988	7	0	4	3	0.0	Euro 1988 – failed to qualify
	Ingvar Stadheim	1988–1990	24	5	8	11	20.8	1990 World Cup – failed to qualify
	Egil Olsen	1990–1998	88	46	26	16	52.3	Euro 1992 – failed to qualify 1994 World Cup – group stage Euro 1996 – failed to qualify 1998 World Cup – round of 16
	Nils Johan Semb	1998–2003	68	29	21	18	42.6	Euro 2000 – group stage 2002 World Cup – failed to qualify Euro 2004 – failed to qualify
	Åge Hareide	2004–2008	58	24	18	16	41.4	2006 World Cup – failed to qualify Euro 2008 – failed to qualify
	Egil Olsen	2009–2013	49	25	8	16	51.0	2010 World Cup – failed to qualify Euro 2012 – failed to qualify
	Per-Mathias Høgmo	2013–2016	35	10	7	18	28.6	2014 World Cup – failed to qualify Euro 2016 – failed to qualify
	Lars Lagerbäck	2017–2020	29	15	8	6	51.7	2018 World Cup – failed to qualify
	Ståle Solbakken	2020–						

Key: P–games played, W–games won, D–games drawn; L–games lost, %–win percentage
