= 1994 FIFA World Cup Group E =

Football tournament group stage

Group E of the 1994 FIFA World Cup was one of six groups of four teams competing at the 1994 World Cup in the United States. The first match was played June 18, 1994, and the final games took place simultaneously on June 28, 1994.

The group consisted of Italy, Republic of Ireland, Mexico, and Norway. Mexico won the group on goals scored. Ireland and Italy also progressed to the knockout rounds, having finished with identical records and the Irish team qualifying in second place as a result of their victory against the Italians. The Italians qualified as one of the best-scoring third place teams. Norway's shortcomings in attack ultimately let them down, and they exited the tournament with only one goal. It is the only group in World Cup history in which all four teams finished with the same number of points, and all the teams even had the same goal difference.

It is also the most difficult group in World Cup since FIFA ranking debuted in 1992, measured in terms of average FIFA ranking. The average FIFA ranking of the four teams was 10 (Italy 4, Norway 6, Ireland 14 and Mexico 16).

== Standings ==
Pos	Team	Pld	W	D	L	GF	GA	GD	Pts	Qualification
1	Mexico	3	1	1	1	3	3	0	4	Advance to knockout stage
2	Republic of Ireland	3	1	1	1	2	2	0	4 (Note: Head-to-head result: Italy 0–1 Republic of Ireland.)	Advance to knockout stage
3	Italy	3	1	1	1	2	2	0	4	Advance to knockout stage
4	Norway	3	1	1	1	1	1	0	4	

Source: FIFA

== Matches ==
All times local (EDT/UTC–4, CDT/UTC–5, PDT/UTC–7)

=== Italy vs Republic of Ireland ===
Ray Houghton's early goal proved the only one of the match where Ireland's defense prevailed over Italy's attack. During the game, members of the Ulster Volunteer Force (UVF), a loyalist paramilitary group, burst into a pub in Northern Ireland with assault rifles and fired on the customers, killing six civilians and wounding five. The pub was targeted because it was frequented mainly by Catholics, and was crowded with supporters watching the Republic of Ireland. It is thus sometimes called the "World Cup massacre" or the Loughinisland massacre.

June 18, 1994
4:00 p.m. EDT (UTC–4)

Italy	0–1	Republic of Ireland
		Houghton 12'

Giants Stadium, East Rutherford
Attendance: 75,338
Referee: Mario van der Ende (Netherlands)

Italy	Republic of Ireland

GK	1	Gianluca Pagliuca
RB	9	Mauro Tassotti
CB	4	Alessandro Costacurta
CB	6	Franco Baresi (c)
LB	5	Paolo Maldini
RM	16	Roberto Donadoni
CM	11	Demetrio Albertini
CM	13	Dino Baggio
LM	17	Alberico Evani	(substituted off) 45'
RF	10	Roberto Baggio
LF	20	Giuseppe Signori	(substituted off) 84'
Substitutions:
RF	19	Daniele Massaro	(substituted on) 45'
LM	14	Nicola Berti	(substituted on) 84'
Manager:
Arrigo Sacchi

GK	1	Packie Bonner
RB	2	Denis Irwin	(yellow card) 80'
CB	5	Paul McGrath
CB	14	Phil Babb
LB	3	Terry Phelan	(yellow card) 30'
RM	8	Ray Houghton		(substituted off) 68'
CM	6	Roy Keane
CM	10	John Sheridan
CM	7	Andy Townsend (c)
LM	11	Steve Staunton
CF	15	Tommy Coyne	(yellow card) 50'	(substituted off) 90'
Substitutions:
MF	21	Jason McAteer		(substituted on) 68'
FW	9	John Aldridge		(substituted on) 90'
Manager:
(England) Jack Charlton

Assistant referees:
Jan Dolstra (Netherlands)
Park Hae-Yong (Korean Republic)
Fourth official:
Arturo Angeles (United States)

=== Norway vs Mexico ===
The only goal of the game (in what was Norway's first World Cup victory) was scored by Kjetil Rekdal in the 85th minute when the referee let the game continue after a foul on Jan Åge Fjørtoft close to the Mexican penalty area. The goalscorer entered the game minutes before the decisive strike.

June 19, 1994
4:00 p.m. EDT (UTC–4)

Norway	1–0	Mexico
Rekdal 84'

RFK Stadium, Washington, D.C.
Attendance: 52,395
Referee: Sándor Puhl (Hungary)

Norway	Mexico

GK	1	Erik Thorstvedt
RB	18	Alf-Inge Haaland	(yellow card) 16'
CB	20	Henning Berg
CB	4	Rune Bratseth (c)
LB	5	Stig Inge Bjørnebye
RM	6	Jostein Flo
CM	22	Lars Bohinen
CM	7	Erik Mykland		(substituted off) 78'
CM	8	Øyvind Leonhardsen	(yellow card) 26'
LM	11	Mini Jakobsen		(substituted off) 46'
CF	9	Jan Åge Fjørtoft
Substitutions:
DF	2	Gunnar Halle		(substituted on) 46'
MF	10	Kjetil Rekdal		(substituted on) 78'
Manager:
Egil Olsen

GK	1	Jorge Campos
RB	21	Raúl Gutiérrez		(substituted off) 71'
CB	2	Claudio Suárez	(yellow card) 62'
CB	3	Juan de Dios Ramírez Perales
LB	5	Ramón Ramírez
CM	4	Ignacio Ambríz (c)
CM	14	Joaquín del Olmo
RW	16	Luis Antonio Valdéz		(substituted off) 46'
AM	10	Luis García
LW	11	Luís Roberto Alves
CF	9	Hugo Sánchez
Substitutions:
LM	17	Benjamín Galindo		(substituted on) 46'
RM	6	Marcelino Bernal		(substituted on) 71'
Manager:
Miguel Mejía Barón

Assistant referees:
Sándor Márton (Hungary)
Valentin Ivanov (Russia)
Fourth official:
Manuel Díaz Vega (Spain)

=== Italy vs Norway ===
Gianluca Pagliuca of Italy became the first goalkeeper to be sent off in a World Cup game, dismissed for handling outside his area against Norway.

June 23, 1994
4:00 p.m. EDT (UTC–4)

Italy	1–0	Norway
D. Baggio 69'

Giants Stadium, East Rutherford
Attendance: 74,624
Referee: Hellmut Krug (Germany)

Italy	Norway

GK	1	Gianluca Pagliuca	(red card) 21'
RB	3	Antonio Benarrivo
CB	4	Alessandro Costacurta
CB	6	Franco Baresi (c)		(substituted off) 49'
LB	5	Paolo Maldini
RM	13	Dino Baggio
CM	11	Demetrio Albertini
LM	14	Nicola Berti
RF	18	Pierluigi Casiraghi	(yellow card) 34'	(substituted off) 69'
CF	20	Giuseppe Signori
LF	10	Roberto Baggio		(substituted off) 22'
Substitutions:
GK	12	Luca Marchegiani		(substituted on) 22'
DF	2	Luigi Apolloni		(substituted on) 49'
FW	19	Daniele Massaro		(substituted on) 69'
Manager:
Arrigo Sacchi

GK	1	Erik Thorstvedt
RB	18	Alf-Inge Haaland	(yellow card) 68'
CB	20	Henning Berg
CB	4	Rune Bratseth (c)
LB	5	Stig Inge Bjørnebye	(yellow card) 32'
RM	6	Jostein Flo
CM	22	Lars Bohinen
CM	7	Erik Mykland		(substituted off) 81'
CM	8	Øyvind Leonhardsen
LM	21	Sigurd Rushfeldt		(substituted off) 45'
CF	9	Jan Åge Fjørtoft
Substitutions:
MF	11	Mini Jakobsen		(substituted on) 45'
MF	10	Kjetil Rekdal		(substituted on) 81'
Manager:
Egil Olsen

Assistant referees:
Tapio Yli-Karro (Finland)
Roy Pearson (England)
Fourth official:
Philip Don (England)

=== Mexico vs Republic of Ireland ===
June 24, 1994
12:30 p.m. EDT (UTC–4)

Mexico	2–1	Republic of Ireland
García 42', 65'		Aldridge 84'

Citrus Bowl, Orlando
Attendance: 60,790
Referee: Kurt Röthlisberger (Switzerland)

Mexico	Republic of Ireland

GK	1	Jorge Campos	(yellow card) 57'
RB	20	Jorge Rodríguez		(substituted off) 80' (Note: Mistake in FIFA report. Per RSSSF, it was not Joaquín del Olmo but Jorge Rodríguez who was replaced by Raúl Gutiérrez.)
CB	2	Claudio Suárez
CB	3	Juan de Dios Ramírez Perales
LB	14	Joaquín del Olmo	(yellow card) 45'
RM	6	Marcelino Bernal
CM	4	Ignacio Ambríz (c)
LM	8	Alberto García Aspe
RF	10	Luis García
CF	7	Carlos Hermosillo		(substituted off) 80'
LF	11	Luís Roberto Alves
Substitutions:
CF	19	Luis Miguel Salvador		(substituted on) 80'
LB	21	Raúl Gutiérrez		(substituted on) 80'
Manager:
Miguel Mejía Barón

GK	1	Packie Bonner
RB	2	Denis Irwin	(yellow card) 26'
CB	5	Paul McGrath
CB	14	Phil Babb
LB	3	Terry Phelan	(yellow card) 70'
RM	8	Ray Houghton
CM	6	Roy Keane
CM	10	John Sheridan
CM	7	Andy Townsend (c)
LM	11	Steve Staunton		(substituted off) 66'
CF	15	Tommy Coyne		(substituted off) 67'
Substitutions:
MF	21	Jason McAteer		(substituted on) 66'
FW	9	John Aldridge		(substituted on) 67'
Manager:
(England) Jack Charlton

Assistant referees:
Michał Listkiewicz (Poland)
Paulo Jorge Alves (Brazil)
Fourth official:
Renato Marsiglia (Brazil)

=== Italy vs Mexico ===
June 28, 1994
12:30 p.m. EDT (UTC–4)

Italy	1–1	Mexico
Massaro 48'		Bernal 57'

RFK Stadium, Washington, D.C.
Attendance: 52,535
Referee: Francisco Oscar Lamolina (Argentina)

Italy	Mexico

GK	12	Luca Marchegiani
RB	3	Antonio Benarrivo
CB	4	Alessandro Costacurta
CB	2	Luigi Apolloni
LB	5	Paolo Maldini (c)
RM	13	Dino Baggio		(substituted off) 65'
CM	11	Demetrio Albertini	(yellow card) 33'
LM	14	Nicola Berti
RF	18	Pierluigi Casiraghi		(substituted off) 45'
CF	20	Giuseppe Signori
LF	10	Roberto Baggio
Substitutions:
CF	19	Daniele Massaro		(substituted on) 45'
LM	16	Roberto Donadoni		(substituted on) 65'
Manager:
Arrigo Sacchi

GK	1	Jorge Campos
RB	20	Jorge Rodríguez
CB	2	Claudio Suárez
CB	3	Juan Ramírez
LB	14	Joaquín del Olmo	(yellow card) 25'
RM	6	Marcelino Bernal
CM	4	Ignacio Ambríz (c)
LM	8	Alberto García Aspe	(yellow card) 66'
RF	10	Luis García	(yellow card) 63'	(substituted off) 81'
CF	7	Carlos Hermosillo
LF	11	Luís Roberto Alves
Substitutions:
CM	13	Juan Carlos Chávez		(substituted on) 81'
Manager:
Miguel Mejía Barón

Assistant referees:
Ernesto Taibi (Argentina)
Eugene Brazzale (Australia)
Fourth official:
Hellmut Krug (Germany)

=== Republic of Ireland vs Norway ===
June 28, 1994
12:30 p.m. EDT (UTC–4)

Republic of Ireland	0–0	Norway

Giants Stadium, East Rutherford
Attendance: 72,404
Referee: José Torres Cadena (Colombia)

Republic of Ireland	Norway

GK	1	Packie Bonner
RB	12	Gary Kelly	(yellow card) 83'
CB	5	Paul McGrath
CB	14	Phil Babb
LB	11	Steve Staunton
RM	21	Jason McAteer
CM	6	Roy Keane	(yellow card) 3'
CM	10	John Sheridan
CM	7	Andy Townsend (c)		(substituted off) 75'
LM	8	Ray Houghton	(yellow card) 29'
CF	9	John Aldridge		(substituted off) 65'
Substitutions:
MF	20	David Kelly		(substituted on) 65'
MF	18	Ronnie Whelan		(substituted on) 75'
Manager:
(England) Maurice Setters (Note: Republic of Ireland manager Jack Charlton was given a touchline ban by FIFA following argument with an official in the match against Mexico. Assistant manager Maurice Setters filled in as head coach.)

GK	1	Erik Thorstvedt
RB	20	Henning Berg
CB	3	Erland Johnsen	(yellow card) 45'
CB	4	Rune Bratseth (c)
LB	5	Stig Inge Bjørnebye
RM	6	Jostein Flo
CM	8	Øyvind Leonhardsen		(substituted off) 68'
CM	10	Kjetil Rekdal
CM	7	Erik Mykland
LM	2	Gunnar Halle		(substituted off) 34'
CF	16	Gøran Sørloth	(yellow card) 36'
Substitutions:
MF	11	Mini Jakobsen		(substituted on) 34'
MF	22	Lars Bohinen		(substituted on) 68'
Manager:
Egil Olsen

Assistant referees:
Paulo Jorge Alves (Brazil)
Park Hae-Yong (Korea Republic)
Fourth official:
Leslie Mottram (Scotland)

== See also ==
- Loughinisland massacre, that occurred in The Heights Bar in Northern Ireland while patrons were watching the Republic of Ireland vs Italy match
- Republic of Ireland at the FIFA World Cup
- Italy at the FIFA World Cup
- Mexico at the FIFA World Cup
- Norway at the FIFA World Cup
- 2000 Africa Cup of Nations Group A – another group with a similar situation of all four teams scoring the exact same points at the end of group stage
- UEFA Euro 2024 Group E – another example of a group with this outcome
