= Kjetil Rekdal =

Norwegian footballer and manager (born 1968)

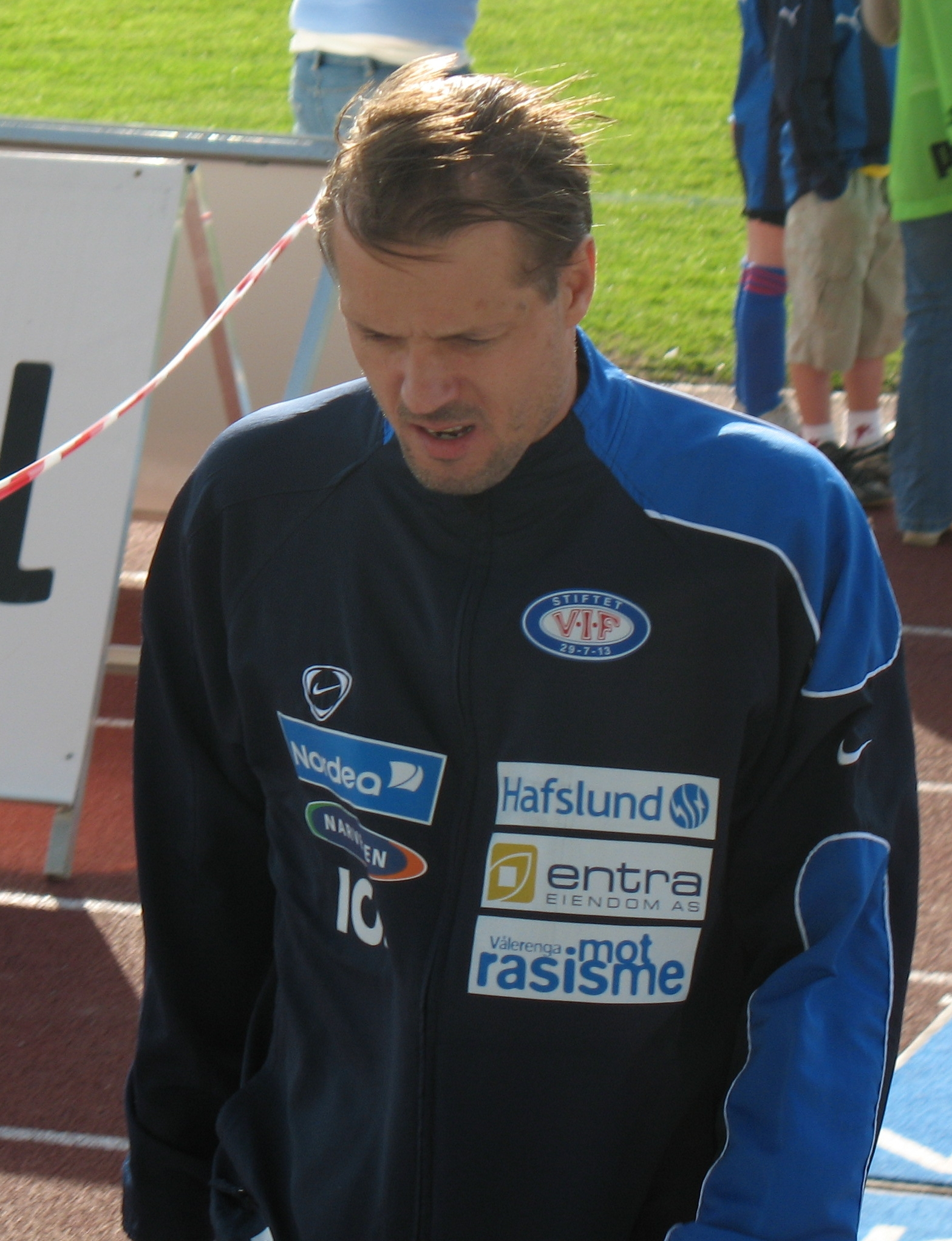
- Rekdal in 2006

Personal information
- Full name: Kjetil André Rekdal
- Date of birth: 6 November 1968 (age 58)
- Place of birth: Vestnes, Norway
- Height: 1.87 m (6 ft 2 in)
- Position: Midfielder

Youth career
- 1979–1985: Fiksdal/Rekdal

Senior career*
Years	Team	Apps	(Gls)
1985–1988	Molde	75	(25)
1988–1990	Borussia Mönchengladbach	9	(0)
1990–1996	Lierse	181	(71)
1994	→ Molde (loan)	8	(4)
1996–1997	Rennes	31	(2)
1997–2000	Hertha BSC	64	(4)
2000–2004	Vålerenga	116	(21)
Total		484	(127)

International career
1984	Norway U15	2	(0)
1985	Norway U16	3	(1)
1986	Norway U17	5	(8)
1985	Norway U19	7	(3)
1987–1989	Norway U21	11	(3)
1987–2000	Norway	83	(17)

Managerial career
- 2001–2006: Vålerenga
- 2006–2007: Lierse
- 2007–2008: 1. FC Kaiserslautern
- 2008–2012: Aalesund
- 2013–2017: Vålerenga
- 2018–2019: Start
- 2020–2021: HamKam
- 2022–2023: Rosenborg
- 2024: AC Omonia
- 2024–: Aalesund
- * Club domestic league appearances and goals

Kjetil André Rekdal (born 6 November 1968) is a Norwegian football manager and a former player. He is the manager of Norwegian club Aalesund.

Rekdal began his playing career at Molde FK, playing afterwards for clubs in the Bundesliga, Ligue 1, and Belgian Pro League. Playing as a midfielder during his time as a player, his 83 caps with the Norway national team make him the seventh most capped player in the team's history.

Rekdal previously managed Vålerenga from 2000 to 2006, during which he won both the cup and league title. He has also been in charge of 1. FC Kaiserslautern, Lierse, and Aalesund. During his time at Aalesund, the club earned two cup titles and saw a period of success previously unmatched in their history, which was attributed to Rekdal.

== Club career ==
Born in Vestnes Municipality, Rekdal started playing football for the local club Fiksdal/Rekdal in 1979. Later, as a 16-year-old, he started his professional career with the local top-flight club Molde FK, becoming the second-youngest player in the league. In 1988, he signed with the Bundesliga club Borussia Mönchengladbach and stayed with them for two years before moving to the Belgian Pro League side Lierse S.K. and remaining there until 1996, with the exception of the 1994 season, which he spent on loan helping his former club Molde FK gain promotion to Tippeligaen and win the domestic cup.

In 1996, he signed for Ligue 1 club Rennes. The highlight of his playing career was a highly successful spell at Hertha BSC in Germany between 1997 and 2000. His final years as a player and then player/manager were spent in the Norwegian club Vålerenga, where he picked up another cup winner's medal in 2002 before retiring in 2004. In the summer of 2007, Rekdal officially rejoined his youth club Fiksdal/Rekdal.

== International career ==
Rekdal has 83 games for the Norway national team, after his debut against Italy in 1987, and played in two FIFA World Cups (1994 and 1998). He scored 17 goals for the national team, among those a long-range goal at Wembley against England in 1992, the only goal in the game as Norway beat Mexico in the 1994 World Cup, and a penalty in the 1998 World Cup against Brazil to win the game 2–1, prompting the commentator to say how "the man with the yellow boots has hurt those wearing the yellow shirts...Delight for Egil Olsen". The two World Cup goals make him the second highest-scoring Norwegian in World Cup history, with one goal more than Arne Brustad, Dan Eggen, Håvard Flo and Tore André Flo.

== Managerial career ==
=== Vålerenga ===
Rekdal has proven himself a successful coach, leading Vålerenga from relegation in 2001 and famously weeping as his team avoided relegation the following year and back into position as one of the dominating clubs in the Tippeligaen. In 2004, he led the team to second place, losing the first place on goal difference to Rosenborg, and in 2005, his team finally won the league for the first time in 21 years, ending Rosenborg's 13-year reign as champions of Norway. Along the way, he received legend status in the club, partly due to the fact that he refused an offer of a six-digit coaching salary in order to help the club financially.

=== Lierse ===
Rekdal resigned as coach at Vålerenga on 21 August 2006, following a string of poor results. He was appointed manager of his former club Lierse on 21 November 2006. When he arrived at the club, Lierse lay bottom of the table with only two points in fifteen matches. At the end of the season, they ended up with 26 points and avoided direct relegation. In the play-offs, Lierse only managed to win three of their six matches and were relegated to the Second Division after all.

=== 1. FC Kaiserslautern ===
In May 2007, Rekdal signed on to manage Kaiserslautern in the German 2. Bundesliga. He left the club in early February of the following year, the club lying in sixteenth place.

=== Aalesund ===
He joined forces with Norwegian top-flight outfit Aalesund in 2008 after moving back to Norway. Joining the club mid-season, he found Aalesund lying in a relegation spot but managed to get a relegation play-off spot, where Aalesund beat challengers Sogndal 7–2 on aggregate, thereby securing a new season in the Tippeligaen. In 2009, he led Aalesund to the club's first victory in the Norwegian Cup, where they beat arch rivals Molde 3–2 after a penalty shootout in the final. In 2010, he led the club to the fourth place in Tippeligaen, the club's best result ever. In 2011, he received wide praise when his club came close to the historic feat of qualifying for the 2011–12 UEFA Europa League, losing the last playoff game to the Dutch side AZ Alkmaar, having won the first leg 2–1. The same year, he again led Aalesund to win the Norwegian Cup Final, thereby securing a UEFA Europa League qualification spot for the third consecutive year. His contract with Aalesund was terminated on 26 November 2012. After he won his second Norwegian Cup with Aalesund in three years, he was once again said to take over as national team coach after Drillo.

On 26 November 2012, the board of directors of Aalesund announced the termination of Rekdal's contract. The board stressed that it was not due to the season results but rather as a result of a general review. Analysts noted that the sacking was likely a result of a power struggle within the club between Rekdal, the sports director, and the chairman of the board.

=== Return to Vålerenga ===
Rekdal started his second tenure for Vålerenga when he was appointed as head coach on 8 January 2013.

On 13 July 2016, it was announced he would end his tenure as head coach of Valerenga after the 2016 season and will move into the position as sporting director to make way for Ronny Deila, who will take over as head coach.

=== Start ===
Rekdal was appointed as head coach on 1 June 2018 after former head coach Mark Dempsey was sacked on 18 May 2018. Rekdal signed a two-year contract with Start.

Rekdal took over the team after 12 games of the season had been played; during his spell, only six teams gathered more points, yet the team was relegated [at the end of that season].

That job ended; In an interview in 2020, he said that frequent visits to [places for betting/gambling or] one or more casinos, was not well-received by [his previous employer] Start.

== Personal life ==
Born 6 November 1968 in Rekdal in Vestnes Municipality into a family of six, including three younger siblings, his younger brother Sindre also played professionally with Molde FK, helping them win the domestic cup in 1994. Among his interests and hobbies is freshwater fishing and card-games such as Poker, having competed in amateur tournaments internationally.

Rekdal moved to Ottestad neighborhood in Hamar in 2013, with his wife and four children.

During his time at Lierse, Rekdal had a clause in his contract that allowed him to keep up-to-date with Leeds United results at half-time intervals via BBC Radio. He is a fanatic supporter of the Yorkshire club.

Rekdal is highly superstitious. To avoid bad luck, he never appears on matchday without his locally produced trademark Pear-flavoured soft drink.

While coaching Aalesunds FK, he appeared in the home matches of tier-five club Fiksdal/Rekdal as a player, stating that he wished to contribute to the club with which he started his career.

== Career statistics ==
Scores and results list Norway's goal tally first, score column indicates score after each Rekdal goal.

List of international goals scored by Kjetil Rekdal
No.	Date	Venue	Opponent	Score	Result	Competition
1	9 September 1992	Ullevaal Stadion, Oslo, Norway	San Marino	1–0	10–0	1994 FIFA World Cup qualification
2	9 September 1992	Ullevaal Stadion, Oslo, Norway	San Marino	10–0	10–0	1994 FIFA World Cup qualification
3	23 September 1992	Ullevaal Stadion, Oslo, Norway	Netherlands	1–0	2–1	1994 FIFA World Cup qualification
4	14 October 1992	Wembley Stadium, London, England	England	1–1	1–1	1994 FIFA World Cup qualification
5	28 April 1993	Ullevaal Stadion, Oslo, Norway	Turkey	1–0	3–1	1994 FIFA World Cup qualification
6	19 June 1994	RFK Stadium, Washington, D.C., United States	Mexico	1–0	1–0	1994 FIFA World Cup
7	12 October 1994	Ullevaal Stadion, Oslo, Norway	Netherlands	1–1	1–1	UEFA Euro 1996 qualification
8	16 November 1994	Dinamo Stadium, Minsk, Belarus	Belarus	4–0	4–0	UEFA Euro 1996 qualification
9	26 April 1995	Ullevaal Stadion, Oslo, Norway	Luxembourg	5–0	5–0	UEFA Euro 1996 qualification
10	25 May 1995	Ullevaal Stadion, Oslo, Norway	Ghana	1–0	3–2	Friendly
11	9 October 1996	Ullevaal Stadion, Oslo, Norway	Hungary	1–0	3–0	1998 FIFA World Cup qualification
12	9 October 1996	Ullevaal Stadion, Oslo, Norway	Hungary	2–0	3–0	1998 FIFA World Cup qualification
13	9 October 1996	Ullevaal Stadion, Oslo, Norway	Hungary	3–0	3–0	1998 FIFA World Cup qualification
14	27 May 1998	Molde Stadion, Molde, Norway	Saudi Arabia	1–0	6–0	Friendly
15	23 June 1998	Stade Vélodrome, Marseille, France	Brazil	2–1	2–1	1998 FIFA World Cup
16	10 October 1998	Bežigrad Stadium, Ljubljana, Slovenia	Slovenia	2–1	2–1	UEFA Euro 2000 qualification
17	14 October 1998	Ullevaal Stadion, Oslo, Norway	Albania	2–2	2–2	UEFA Euro 2000 qualification

== Managerial statistics (all official matches) ==
As of match played 22 November 2026

Team	Nat	From	To	Record					Ref.
Team	Nat	From	To	P	W	D	L	Win %	Ref.
Vålerenga	(Norway)	1 January 2001	20 August 2006	209	97	60	52	46.41	
Lierse	(Belgium)	22 November 2006	25 June 2007	28	9	6	13	32.14	
1. FC Kaiserslautern	(Germany)	1 July 2007	9 February 2008	20	4	6	10	20.00	
Aalesund	(Norway)	5 September 2008	26 November 2012	163	73	35	55	44.79	
Vålerenga	(Norway)	8 January 2013	31 December 2016	137	58	30	49	42.34	
Start	(Norway)	1 June 2018	28 March 2019	21	8	4	9	38.10	
HamKam	(Norway)	15 August 2020	31 December 2021	54	33	12	9	61.11	
Rosenborg	(Norway)	1 January 2022	16 June 2023	47	24	11	12	51.06	
AC Omonia	(Cyprus)	10 January 2024	21 February 2024	9	5	2	2	55.56	
Aalesund	(Norway)	1 July 2024	present	89	42	22	25	47.19	
Total				777	353	188	236	45.4	—

== Honours ==
=== As player ===
Molde

- Norwegian Football Cup: 1994

Vålerenga

- Norwegian Football Cup: 2002
- Norwegian First Division: 2001

=== As Coach ===
Vålerenga

- Eliteserien: 2005
- Norwegian Football Cup: 2002
- Norwegian First Division: 2001

Aalesund

- Norwegian Football Cup: 2009, 2011

HamKam

- Norwegian First Division: 2021

Individual

- Norwegian First Division Coach of the Month: June 2021, August 2021, October 2024
- Norwegian First Division Coach of the Year: 2021
