= Kment =

Kment is a surname. Notable people with the surname include:

- Petr Kment (1942−2013), Czechoslovak wrestler
- Wilhelm Kment (1914–2002), Austrian football player and manager
