= Youssef Rossi =

Moroccan footballer (born 1973)

Personal information
- Date of birth: June 28, 1973 (age 53)
- Place of birth: Casablanca, Morocco
- Height: 1.81 m (5 ft 11 in)
- Position: Defender

Youth career
- Olympique de Casablanca

Senior career*
Years	Team	Apps	(Gls)
1995–1996	Raja Casablanca		
1997–1999	Rennes	41	(0)
1999–2000	NEC Nijmegen	4	(0)
2000–2003	Dunfermline Athletic	20	(1)
2003–2004	Raja Casablanca		
2004–2007	Al Khor		
2007–2008	Al Shamal		

International career
1996–2001	Morocco	36	(0)
- * Club domestic league appearances and goals

Youssef Rossi (Arabic: يوسف روسي; born June 28, 1973) is a Moroccan former professional footballer who played as a defender.

== Club career ==
Rossi was born in Casablanca, Morocco. started his playing career with local side Raja Casablanca in 1995, before being signed by French side Stade Rennais. After over 40 games for the Ligue 1 side, Rossi then signed al loan-contract for NEC Nijmegen, where he disappeared after only four matches, before moving to Scottish Premier League side Dunfermline Athletic in 2000.

After four months with the SPL side, Rossi first appeared in an under-21 match against St Johnstone in November 2000 but was sent off after 25 minutes. He received another red card later that month, after being sent off for a second bookable offence against Dundee United. As he made his way off the pitch, Rossi was seen to make a gesture that provoked United fans. He scored his only goal for the club against Aberdeen on Boxing Day 2000. In August 2001, Rossi had his wages stopped in what proved to be a long drawn out saga which would see him leave Scotland for Morocco, only to have a worldwide ban placed on him by FIFA after going AWOL for more than a year.

Rossi finally left Dunfermline in December 2003 to re-sign for his first club Raja Casablanca. He stayed in Morocco for one year before moving to Al Khor in Qatar.

== International career ==
Rossi played for the Morocco national team and was a participant at the 1998 FIFA World Cup.

== Managerial career ==
Rossi was the Technical Director of Raja from 2009 to 2012 and 2014 to 2016. In November 2015, he claimed he had not been paid by Raja's President, Mohamed Boudrika, for nine months.
