= Mladen Dabanovič =

Slovenian footballer (born 1971)

Personal information
- Date of birth: 13 September 1971 (age 55)
- Place of birth: Maribor, SFR Yugoslavia
- Height: 1.96 m (6 ft 5 in)
- Position: Goalkeeper

Youth career
- Dravinja

Senior career*
Years	Team	Apps	(Gls)
1990–1995	Maribor	126	(0)
1995–1999	Rudar Velenje	112	(0)
1999–2004	Lokeren	72	(0)
2004–2008	Drava Ptuj	98	(0)
2009	Aluminij	0	(0)
Total		408	(0)

International career
1998–2003	Slovenia	25	(0)
- * Club domestic league appearances and goals

Mladen Dabanovič (born 13 September 1971) is a Slovenian retired footballer who played as a goalkeeper.

== Club career ==
Dabanovič grew up in Slovenske Konjice and began playing football for local side Dravinja. He started his professional career with Maribor and Rudar Velenje, before moving to Belgian side Sporting Lokeren in 1999. In January 2004, he returned to Slovenia where he played for Drava Ptuj for four seasons.

He works as a goalkeeper coach at Aluminij.

== International career ==
Dabanovič made his debut for Slovenia in an August 1998 friendly match away against Hungary, coming on as a 46th-minute substitute for the legendary Marko Simeunovič, and earned a total of 25 caps, scoring no goals. He was the country's first-choice goalkeeper at the Euro 2000 finals and played in all of their three group matches at the tournament. He also played for Slovenia in their group match against Paraguay at the 2002 FIFA World Cup finals. His final international was a November 2003 European Championship qualification match against Croatia.

== Honours ==
Maribor

- Slovenian Cup: 1991–92, 1993–94

Rudar Velenje

- Slovenian Cup: 1997–98

== See also ==
- Slovenian international players
- NK Maribor players
