= Marinko Galič =

Slovenian footballer (born 1970)

Personal information
- Date of birth: 22 April 1970 (age 56)
- Place of birth: Koper, SFR Yugoslavia
- Position: Defender

Youth career
- Koper

Senior career*
Years	Team	Apps	(Gls)
1991–1993	Koper	74	(13)
1994–1996	Maribor	63	(15)
1996–1997	Zagreb	4	(0)
1997	Dinamo Zagreb	11	(0)
1998	Mura	23	(1)
1999–2001	Maribor	45	(4)
2001	Rudar Velenje	15	(2)
2002	Koper	13	(0)
2003	Shandong Luneng	19	(1)
2004–2005	Apollon Limassol	3	(0)
2005–2006	Malečnik	10	(1)
2007	Interblock	5	(0)
2007–2009	Malečnik	13	(9)

International career
1994–2002	Slovenia	66	(0)
- * Club domestic league appearances and goals

Marinko Galič (born 22 April 1970) is a Slovenian retired footballer who played as a defender. He represented his country at the two major tournaments for which they qualified, the Euro 2000 and the World Cup 2002.

== Club career ==
Born in Koper, Galič began his career playing for FC Koper in 1991. In 1993, he joined Maribor where he played three seasons. For the first time, he moved abroad in 1996 for NK Zagreb and Dinamo Zagreb spending two seasons in Croatia before moving to Mura Murska Sobota. In 1998, he returned to Maribor for another three seasons and then he signed for Rudar Velenje before he returned for another two years for the club he started at, NK Koper. He left his country again in 2003 to play for the Chinese team Shandong Luneng and for the Cypriot team Apollon Limassol. After a short spell on Cyprus he returned home and played one season in the third league for Malečnik. He finished his professional career with a short spell at NK Interblock.

== International career ==
Galič made his debut for Slovenia in a February 1994 friendly match against Georgia and earned a total of 66 caps, scoring no goals. He was a participant at the Euro 2000 and World Cup 2002 and his final international was at the latter tournament against Spain.

== Honours ==
Maribor

- Slovenian PrvaLiga: 1998–99, 1999–2000, 2000–01
- Slovenian Cup: 1993–94, 1998–99

Zagreb

- Croatian Cup: runner-up 1997
