= Driss Benzekri (footballer) =

Moroccan footballer

Personal information
- Full name: Driss Benzekri
- Date of birth: December 31, 1970 (age 55)
- Place of birth: Bouizakarne, Morocco
- Height: 1.81 m (5 ft 11 1/2 in)
- Position: Goalkeeper

Senior career*
Years	Team	Apps	(Gls)
1996–2004	RS Settat	?	(?)
2004–2005	IZK Khemisset	?	(?)

International career
1995–2002	Morocco	27	(0)
- * Club domestic league appearances and goals

Driss Benzekri (Arabic: ادريس بن زكري; Berber: ⴷⵔⵉⵙ ⴱⵏⵣⴽⵔⵉ; born 31 December 1970, Bouizakrane, Morocco) is a retired Moroccan goalkeeper who spent much of his career at RS Settat. He had 26 International Caps for the Morocco National Football Team and was the starting goalkeeper during the 1998 FIFA World Cup. He made his last appearance for Khémisset and has been retired since July 1, 2005.
