= Wilhelm Kment =

Austrian football player and manager (1915–2002)

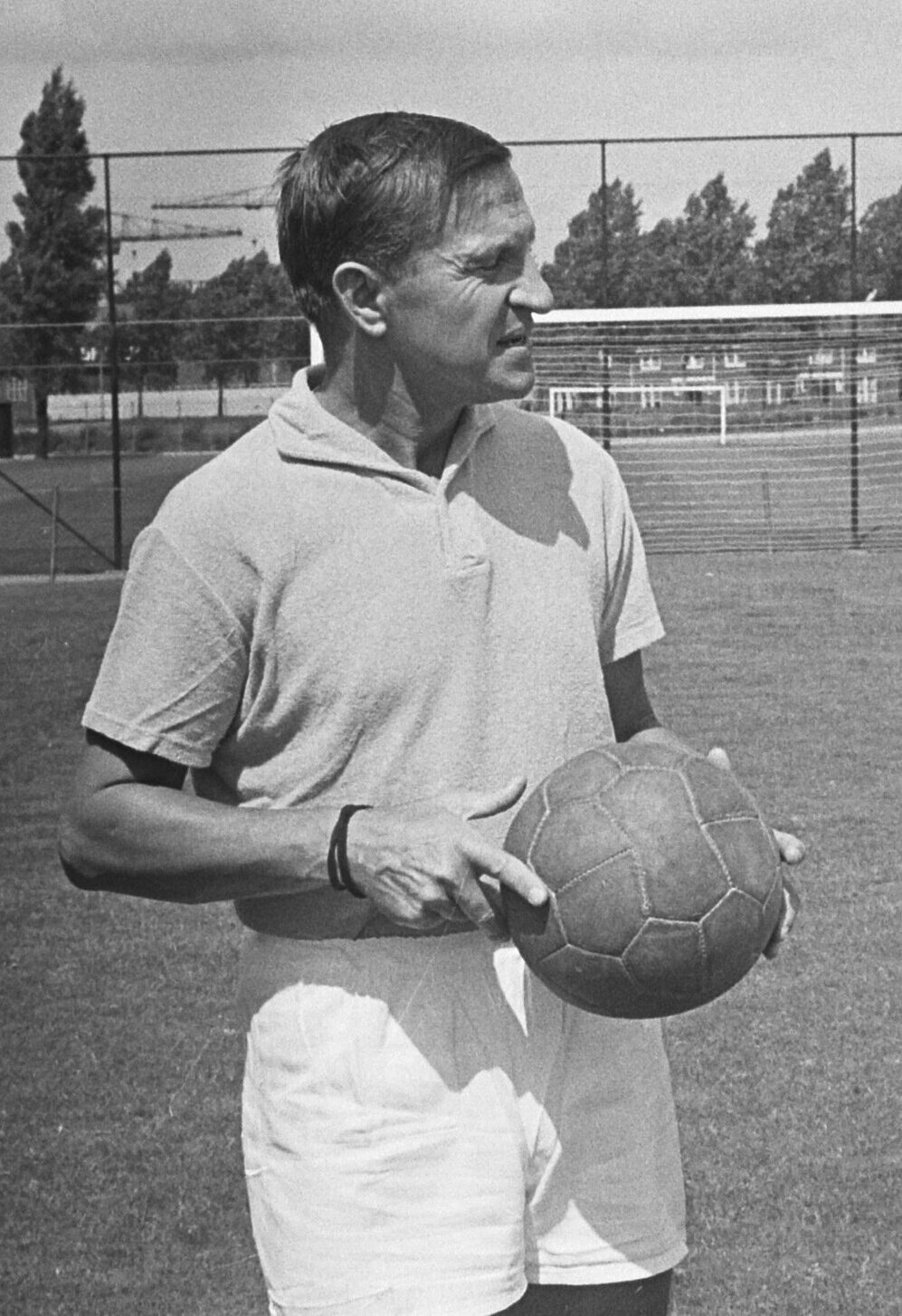
- Kment in 1965

Personal information
- Date of birth: 17 September 1915
- Place of birth: Vienna, Austria-Hungary
- Date of death: 22 December 2002 (aged 87)
- Place of death: Vienna, Austria
- Position: Midfielder

Youth career
- 1930–1932: Landstraßer AC

Senior career*
Years	Team	Apps	(Gls)
1932–1933	Landstraßer AC		
1933–1934	DSV Brünn		
1934–1937	Landstraßer AC		
1937–1947	Wiener Sport-Club		

Managerial career
- 1954–1955: Drafn
- 1956–1960: VVV
- 1960–1962: Norway
- 1962–1964: DOS
- 1964–1967: Feijenoord
- 1967–1969: Norway
- 1970–1972: LASK
- 1973–1974: Raufoss
- 1976: Fredrikstad
- 1979: Greåker
- * Club domestic league appearances and goals

Wilhelm "Willy" Kment (17 September 1915 – 22 December 2002) was an Austrian football player and manager.

== Playing career ==
He played for Landstraßer AC, DSV Brünn and Wiener Sport-Club.

== Coaching career ==
He coached VVV-Venlo, Norway, Feyenoord, LASK Linz and Fredrikstad.

While coaching Drafn, Drammen in Norway, he worked in Drammen Skifabrikk, alongside olympic gold medalist skijumper Birger Ruud.
