= Stig Inge Bjørnebye =

Norwegian footballer (born 1969)

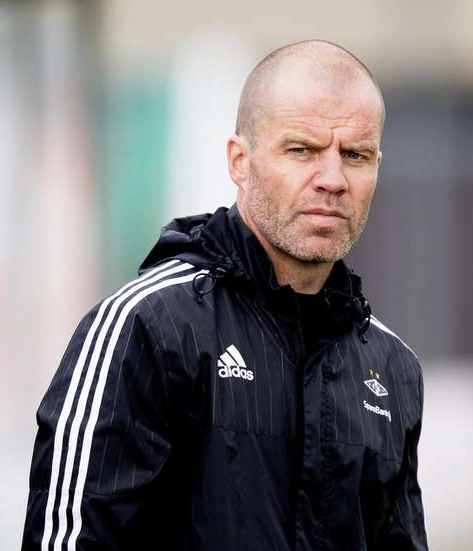
- Bjørnebye in 2017

Personal information
- Full name: Stig Inge Bjørnebye
- Date of birth: 11 December 1969 (age 56)
- Place of birth: Elverum, Norway
- Height: 1.80 m (5 ft 11 in)
- Position: Left back

Team information
- Current team: Rangers (performance director)

Youth career
- 1985–1987: Elverum

Senior career*
Years	Team	Apps	(Gls)
1987–1988	Strømmen	19	(0)
1989–1992	Kongsvinger	62	(3)
1992	Rosenborg	21	(3)
1992–2000	Liverpool	139	(2)
1994	→ Rosenborg (loan)	8	(0)
2000	→ Brøndby (loan)	13	(2)
2000–2003	Blackburn Rovers	55	(1)
Total		317	(11)

International career
1989–2000	Norway	75	(1)

Managerial career
- 2003–2006: Norway (assistant manager)
- 2006–2007: Start
- 2015–2019: Rosenborg (sports director)
- 2021–2025: AGF (sports director)
- 2025–2026: Rangers (football consultant)
- 2026–: Rangers (performance director)
- * Club domestic league appearances and goals

Stig Inge Bjørnebye (born 11 December 1969) is a Norwegian former professional footballer who played in Norway, England and Denmark, most notably for Liverpool, and is currently the performance director of the Scottish football club Rangers. His preferred position was left back, which he occupied for domestic clubs and the national team. Bjørnebye was appointed assistant manager of Norway in 2003, relinquishing the role three years later to succeed Tom Nordlie as manager of Start. He was the sports director of Rosenborg from March 2015 until November 2019.

For club and country, Bjørnebye was noted for his precise deliveries from the flanks. Described as a "solid, no-nonsense full-back", Bjørnebye played competitive football for 16 years, and appeared in 194 Premier League matches, until injury compelled retirement in March 2003. He played for the Norwegian national team in the 1994 and 1998 FIFA World Cup and the Euro 2000 and was capped 75 times, scoring once.

== Club career ==
Stig Inge Bjørnebye was born in Elverum Municipality, the son of skier Jo Inge Bjørnebye, who competed in the 1968 and 1972 Winter Olympics. As a child, Bjørnebye exhibited an interest in emulating his father by becoming a ski jumper.

His footballing career began as a youth player with home club Elverum, before joining Strømmen in the late 1980s. He moved to Kongsvinger in 1989, establishing himself as a first-team regular in the Norwegian top division. After three seasons with Kongsvinger, he transferred to Rosenborg in 1992, where he in his inaugural season won the Norwegian top division and the Norwegian Cup, in the final of which he scored the deciding goal against Lillestrøm.

His performances merited inclusion in the national team and attracted the attention of Liverpool's manager Graeme Souness, who bought Bjørnebye for £600,000 less than one year after moving to Rosenborg. Signed as a replacement for David Burrows, Bjørnebye debuted inauspiciously on 19 December 1992 in a 5–1 defeat to Coventry City. Initial difficulties adapting to the Premier League caused many fans to question his displays on the pitch and he returned to Norway on loan to Rosenborg in 1994.

Bjørnebye's experiences as a Reds' player in the 1994–95 season, under the management of Roy Evans, were markedly more successful than that of previous campaigns. He gained a regular place in the senior team, supplanting the left back position from Julian Dicks, and featured in the 2–1 win against Bolton Wanderers in the final of the 1995 League Cup Final on 2 April 1995. Subsequent injury, a broken leg sustained on 5 April 1995 in a 3–1 win match against Southampton, terminated his season and he was replaced by Steve Harkness.

"I am not very good at [remembering what my fondest footballing memories are] but if I had to pick, I would say my time with Rosenborg, the World Cup game against Mexico in 1994 and my three cup finals – at Ullevaal, Wembley and the Millennium Stadium,"

UEFA.com, 11 March 2003.

Unavailable for several months, Bjørnebye appeared just twice for Liverpool in the 1995–96 season. Recovery and injuries to other left back candidates enabled Bjørnebye to reclaim his place the following season, in which he scored his first goal for Liverpool on 17 August 1996 in a 3–3 draw against Middlesbrough. He contributed to the club's most convincing title challenge since the inception of the Premier League by supplying club strikers Stan Collymore and Robbie Fowler with precise crosses. He was ultimately included in the PFA Team of the Year with Steve McManaman and Mark Wright. The acquisition of Steve Staunton and arrival of Gérard Houllier in the 1998–99 season, limited Bjørnebye's first-team opportunities, leading to his effective marginalisation. Bjørnebye affirmed his recurring determination to stay at Liverpool that season, remarking "If I didn't have any fight in my stomach I'd have left Liverpool at least three times before".

Unable to displace Staunton and Dominic Matteo, Bjørnebye agreed to a loan move to Danish side Brøndby in 2000, who finished second in the Danish Superliga with Bjørnebye on the team. He decided to permanently leave Liverpool after returning from the European Championship, accepting a £300,000 transfer to Blackburn Rovers that reunited him with former manager Graeme Souness. Promotion to the Premier League was achieved in his first year with Rovers, in the process, Bjørnebye scored his only goal for the club on 11 November 2000, in a 2–2 draw against Portsmouth. His final trophy was gained when Blackburn defeated Tottenham Hotspur 2–1 in the 2002 League Cup Final. Successive injuries after the cup victory disrupted and eventually ended his career as a footballer. While preparing for the 2002–03 season, Bjørnebye fractured his eye socket in a training accident. He complained of double vision, underwent surgery, and was rendered unavailable for seven months. Further injury inflicted during a League Cup match on 17 December 2002, in a 2–0 win against Wigan Athletic escalated, while Bjørnebye was recovering in Norway, necessitating emergency surgery to avert the possibility of foot amputation. Bjørnebye announced his retirement on 11 March 2003. Blackburn manager Graeme Souness reacted to the decision with a statement:

It's a very sad day. As far as I am concerned it could hardly be worse for Stig is the consummate dedicated professional. He is as good a professional as any I have worked with, I couldn’t name anybody better and he is [a] fine role model and a proper, proper human being. Stig has had a wonderful career, it's a great shame that it has to end with a freak training-ground accident as he felt, quite rightly, that he could have played longer.

== International career ==
Bjørnebye was capped 75 times by Norway, scoring once – an olympic goal in a 1–0 friendly against the United States on 8 September 1993. Having represented his country at youth, under-21, and "B" level, Bjørnebye debuted for the senior team on 31 May 1989 against Austria. The majority of his caps were collected during Egil Olsen's eight-year tenure as manager of Norway. Under Olsen's guidance, Norway employed a "long ball" policy that was contingent on the height of Olsen's squad. The tactic of directing long passes to the tall winger Jostein Flo, principally delivered by Bjørnebye, became popularly referred to in Norway as the "Flo Pass" (Flo-pasningen). Although criticised for employing the long-ball approach and maintaining a defensively-orientated mentality, Olsen secured qualification for the World Cups of 1994 and 1998. Bjørnebye participated in both tournaments – seven matches in total.

He decided to retire from international football after the 1998 World Cup, intending to focus on his domestic career and family. Bjørnebye unexpectedly reversed his decision after Nils Johan Semb persuaded him to return to the squad for Euro 2000. Unused in Norway's 1–0 win against Spain on 13 June 2000, Bjørnebye was first introduced to the competition in the second match of the group stage, in a 0–1 loss on 18 June 2000 against Yugoslavia, as a 35-minute substitute for his Liverpool colleague Vegard Heggem. He retained his place, featuring in the goalless draw against Slovenia on 21 June 2000, which eliminated Norway from the tournament. His final international match was in a 1–1 draw World Cup qualifier on 7 October 2000 against Wales, placing him ninth in the overall record of appearances for Norway as of 2007.

== Managerial career ==
Bjørnebye returned to football in a non-playing capacity when he was selected by the Norwegian Football Association to replace Harald Aabrekk as Norway's assistant manager, subordinate to the newly appointed Åge Hareide. Prior to the announcement, the media in England had reported that Bjørnebye was considering maintaining a relationship with Blackburn by becoming a scout for the club. He vacated his position in 2006 to succeed Tom Nordlie as manager of Start. Success was forthcoming in his first season; the club competed in Europe and Bjørnebye was the highest earning coach of the season, ahead of his predecessor Nordlie, with an income of almost seven million krone. His appointment lasted two seasons, ending with dismissal in September 2007, after a series of poor results that placed the club in serious danger of being relegated from the Tippeligaen. He was replaced by Benny Lennartsson, who was unable to preserve the club's premier league status; Start were relegated to Norway's second tier.

On 15 March 2015, Stig Inge Bjørnebye succeeded Erik Hoftun as the sports director of Eliteserien club Rosenborg. He since has won the double with Rosenborg two seasons (2015 and 2016). Rosenborg is the first club in the history of Norwegian football to do so two consecutive seasons. As the sports director of Rosenborg Ballklub he has many responsibilities, among many others signing on new players and renewing contracts with existing players. The most notable signing came on 6 March 2017: Nicklas Bendtner signed on for a three-year contract with the Norwegian side. This was the most surprising and most notable signing in the history of Norwegian football. Teammate Pål André Helland commented: "It shouldn't come as a surprise if he becomes the top scorer and we win the league."

In 2021, Bjørnebye succeeded Peter Christiansen as the sports director of the Superligaen club AGF in Denmark. In January 2025, AGF hired a new sports director. So Stig's contract was not renewed and he left Aarhus.

In December 2025, he become interim football consultant and adviser at Rangers. On 18 June 2026 it was confirmed that he had been appointed on a permanent contract as Rangers' Performance Director. His role continues to focus on first team recruitment as well as overseeing the performance department and youth academy.

== Personal life ==
Bjørnebye is married to the former Byåsen handball player Hege Frøseth, with whom he has three children.

== Career statistics ==
=== Club ===
Appearances and goals by club, season and competition
Club	Season	League			National cup		League cup		Continental		Total	
Club	Season	Division	Apps	Goals	Apps	Goals	Apps	Goals	Apps	Goals	Apps	Goals
Strømmen	1987	2. divisjon	0	0	0	0	0	0	0	0	0	0
Strømmen	1988	1. divisjon	19	0	0	0	0	0	0	0	19	0
Strømmen	Total		19	0	0	0	0	0	0	0	19	0
Kongsvinger	1989	1. divisjon	21	2	0	0	0	0	0	0	21	2
Kongsvinger	1990	1. divisjon	20	0	0	0	0	0	0	0	20	0
Kongsvinger	1991	Tippeligaen	21	1	0	0	0	0	0	0	21	1
Kongsvinger	Total		62	3	0	0	0	0	0	0	62	3
Rosenborg	1992	Tippeligaen	21	3	0	0	0	0	0	0	21	3
Liverpool	1992–93	Premier League	11	0	2	0	0	0	0	0	13	0
Liverpool	1993–94	Premier League	9	0	1	0	0	0	0	0	10	0
Liverpool	1994–95	Premier League	31	0	6	0	7	0	0	0	44	0
Liverpool	1995–96	Premier League	2	0	0	0	0	0	0	0	2	0
Liverpool	1996–97	Premier League	38	2	2	0	4	0	8	2	52	4
Liverpool	1997–98	Premier League	25	0	0	0	3	0	4	0	32	0
Liverpool	1998–99	Premier League	23	0	2	0	2	0	4	0	31	0
Liverpool	1999–2000	Premier League	0	0	0	0	0	0	0	0	0	0
Liverpool	Total		139	2	13	0	16	0	16	2	184	4
Rosenborg (loan)	1994	Tippeligaen	8	0	0	0	0	0	0	0	8	0
Brøndby (loan)	1999–2000	Danish Superliga	13	2	0	0	0	0	0	0	13	2
Blackburn Rovers	2000–01	1st Division	32	1	3	0	2	0	0	0	37	1
Blackburn Rovers	2001–02	Premier League	23	0	2	0	3	0	0	0	28	0
Blackburn Rovers	2002–03	Premier League	0	0	0	0	1	0	0	0	1	0
Blackburn Rovers	Total		55	1	5	0	6	0	0	0	66	1
Career total			317	11	18	0	22	0	16	2	373	13

=== International ===
Appearances and goals by national team and year
National team	Year	Apps	Goals
Norway	1989	6	0
Norway	1990	4	0
Norway	1991	3	0
Norway	1992	10	0
Norway	1993	8	1
Norway	1994	10	0
Norway	1995	3	0
Norway	1996	6	0
Norway	1997	8	0
Norway	1998	12	0
Norway	1999	0	0
Norway	2000	5	0
Total		75	1

Scores and results list Norway's goal tally first, score column indicates score after Bjørnebye goal.

International goal scored by Stig Inge Bjørnebye
No.	Date	Venue	Opponent	Score	Result	Competition
1	8 September 1993	Ullevaal Stadion, Oslo, Norway	United States	1–0	1–0	Friendly

== Managerial statistics ==
Team	From	To	Record				
Team	From	To	G	W	D	L	Win %
Start	15 July 2006	5 September 2007	40	13	8	19	32.50
Total			40	13	8	19	32.50

== Honours ==
Rosenborg

- Tippeligaen: 1992, 1994
- Norwegian Football Cup: 1992

Liverpool

- Football League Cup: 1994–95

Blackburn Rovers

- Football League Cup: 2001–02

Individual

- PFA Team of the Year: 1996–97 Premier League
