= Nils Johan Semb =

Norwegian footballer and coach (born 1959)

Personal information
- Date of birth: 24 February 1959 (age 67)
- Place of birth: Horten, Norway

Managerial career
- Years: Team
- 1990-1991: Norway U21
- 1992-1998: Norway U21
- 1998-2003: Norway

Nils Johan Semb (born 24 February 1959) was the coach of the Norway national football team from 1998 to 2003, presiding over 68 matches.

He led the team to its first European Football Championship in 2000. Though successful, at least in the beginning of his tenure, he drew heavy criticism for his team's defense-oriented style, where long balls, counter-attacks and direct passes were hallmarks of their attacking style. He was replaced by Åge Hareide in 2003. He was a commentator for TV 2, then resigned in 2009 to become the Chief of Elite Football at the Football Association of Norway.

He was educated at the Norwegian School of Sport Sciences.
