= Erik Mykland =

Norwegian footballer (born 1971)

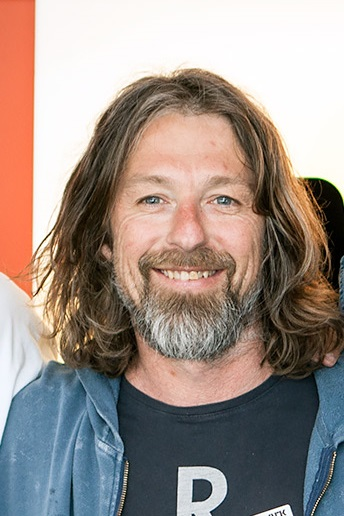

Personal information
- Full name: Erik Mykland
- Date of birth: 21 July 1971 (age 55)
- Place of birth: Risør, Norway
- Height: 1.72 m (5 ft 8 in)
- Position: Midfielder

Youth career
- Risør FK

Senior career*
Years	Team	Apps	(Gls)
1989	Bryne	17	(1)
1989–1996	Start	159	(11)
1995	→ Utrecht (loan)	9	(0)
1996–1997	FC Linz	28	(0)
1997–2000	Panathinaikos	71	(3)
2000–2001	1860 Munich	26	(0)
2002–2004	Copenhagen	51	(1)
2008–2009	Start	9	(0)
2009	Drammen	1	(0)
Total		371	(16)

International career
1990–1991	Norway U21	15	(0)
1990–2000	Norway	78	(2)
- * Club domestic league appearances and goals

Erik Mykland (born 21 July 1971) is a Norwegian former professional footballer who played as a midfielder. He was nicknamed Myggen (mosquito) during his career, as he used to flap his arms and hands like one when celebrating his goals.

A rarity in modern Norway footballers (standing at a mere 172 centimeters and a technical player), he played professionally in six countries, mainly representing IK Start, and earned 78 caps for the Norway national team, having appeared in the 1994 and 1998 World Cups as well as Euro 2000.

== Club career ==
=== IK Start ===
Born in Risør, Mykland started his career with modest Bryne FK, being "brought home" to IK Start in 1989 for NOK 60,000. He first appeared for the club against Moss FK at Melløs Stadion later that year, helping his team rank ninth in the Tippeligaen.

In 1990, Mykland was named midfielder of the year in Norway, and also made his international debut – Start finished the 1991 season third, with wins over Viking FK (4–1) and Rosenborg BK (5–0). After the latter, he and seven other teammates were included in the team of the week and, also that year, he was named best player of an under-21 match, as Norway trounced Italy 6–0 in Stavanger; he represented the nation in this category a total of 15 times.

=== Move abroad ===
After being named the nation's player of the year in 1992, and being relegated with Start four years later, Mykland left for Austria's FC Linz (he had already served a small loan stint at FC Utrecht). Also during that year, producer Thomas Robsahm made a film, simply called "Myggen", which consisted in following him for a whole season.

In 1997, Mykland moved to Panathinaikos but, during his spell at the club, it failed to achieve any silverware. After a season in the Bundesliga with TSV 1860 Munich (he also started 2001–02, but was released following a serious run-in with coach Peter Pacult), he joined F.C. Copenhagen in January 2002, playing very little due to injuries while also gaining a dubious reputation off the pitch: newspaper Ekstra Bladet found him three days before a match drunk on a pavement outside nightclub Rust, asking people walking by to arm wrestle him. Håvard Rem wrote a book about the player in 2000, entitled Erik Mykland : oppvekst, livsstil, EM 2000, spillestil.

In June 2004, Mykland retired at 33 after nearly a year out with injuries. On 8 September 2006, he and several other former Norwegian internationals played an exhibition game against former Argentina stars, including Matías Almeyda, Claudio Caniggia and Diego Maradona, which ended 10–8 for the latter.

In May 2007, Mykland helped build a football school in his hometown of Risør, alongside former Start player Bernt Christian Birkeland.

=== Comeback ===
On 9 July 2008, Mykland announced his return to football at the age of 36, rejoining former club IK Start in the second level. On 2 September, he was charged with possession and use of cocaine and having a "peripheral role" in a large drug dealing network in Norway's Romerike county." In June 2009 he stated that he would withdraw from his active career, after just nine appearances; however, shortly after, he changed his mind, moving to lowly Drammen FK (division three) but retiring for good shortly after.

== International career ==
Mykland made his debut for Norway on 7 November 1990, in a 3–1 win in Tunisia. He scored the first of his two goals for his country on 8 September 1992, during a 1994 FIFA World Cup qualifier against San Marino, which finished 10–0.

During the 1998 World Cup, in-between games, Mykland and fellow international Henning Berg were caught in a bar drinking. They claimed they had only had a few beers, but Berg later admitted in his biography that they actually were drunk.

In UEFA Euro 2000, Mateja Kežman of Yugoslavia was sent off after just one minute for a dangerous tackle on Mykland. In all three competitions combined, he appeared in a total of ten matches, nine as a starter – on 23 June 1998, in their historical 2–1 win over Brazil in Marseille, he started on the bench, coming on as a substitute for Roar Strand at half-time.

While Mykland failed to score more than twice for the national team, a goal he created by playing through Øyvind Leonhardsen in a Euro 2000 qualifier against Slovenia was rated among Norway's best goals ever – much due to his ability to trick several defenders prior to the pass.

== Honours ==
Copenhagen

- Danish Superliga: 2002–03, 2003–04
- Danish Cup: 2003–04
