= Dan Eggen =

Norwegian footballer and manager (born 1970)

Personal information
- Full name: Dan Eggen
- Date of birth: 13 January 1970 (age 56)
- Place of birth: Oslo, Norway
- Height: 1.92 m (6 ft 4 in)
- Position: Centre-back

Youth career
- Lyn
- Årvoll IL

Senior career*
Years	Team	Apps	(Gls)
1988–1990	Ready	40	(6)
1990–1993	BK Frem	72	(15)
1993–1997	Brøndby IF	108	(6)
1997–1999	Celta Vigo	37	(2)
1999–2003	Alavés	40	(2)
2003	Rangers	0	(0)
2003–2004	Le Mans	22	(1)
Total		319	(32)

International career
1993–2001	Norway	25	(2)

Managerial career
- 2009–2011: Kolbotn women
- 2012–2013: KFUM Oslo
- * Club domestic league appearances and goals

Dan Eggen (born 13 January 1970) is a Norwegian football manager and former player.

He has previously coached KFUM Oslo and Kolbotn in the Norwegian Premier League for women. He was capped 25 times for Norway, scoring two goals.

== Career ==
Dan Eggen played as centre-back. He started his career in the Norwegian amateur leagues with sides such as Lyn, Årvoll and Ready. Later he went on to play for several teams outside of Norway: Danish teams BK Frem and Brøndby IF, Spanish teams Celta Vigo and Alavés (where he played in the 2001 UEFA Cup Final), French team Le Mans and Scottish club Rangers.

Eggen represented Norway in 25 caps, scoring two goals. He was a part of the 1994 and 1998 World Cup squads, and the 2000 European Football Championship squad. He was not used in any matches in the 1994 World Cup, but was a key player in 1998 and 2000. Eggen scored the equaliser against Morocco to secure a 2–2 draw for the Norwegians at the Stade de la Mosson, Montpellier in 1998.

== After retirement ==
In 2005, Eggen started a bachelor's degree in economics at the University of Oslo, Norway. He was also the manager of the rock band El Caco. He has studied football coaching at Wang Idrettsgymnas and has been head coach of Kolbotn in the Norwegian Toppserien for women, and for KFUM.

Appears in Satyricon's DVD Roadkill Extravaganza, where he is visiting the band backstage, revealing himself as a fan of Norwegian black metal.

During a Pantera concert in Spain, Eggen joined the band on stage for 30 seconds and showed off headbanging and air guitar playing.
