= Egil Olsen =

Norwegian footballer and manager (born 1942)

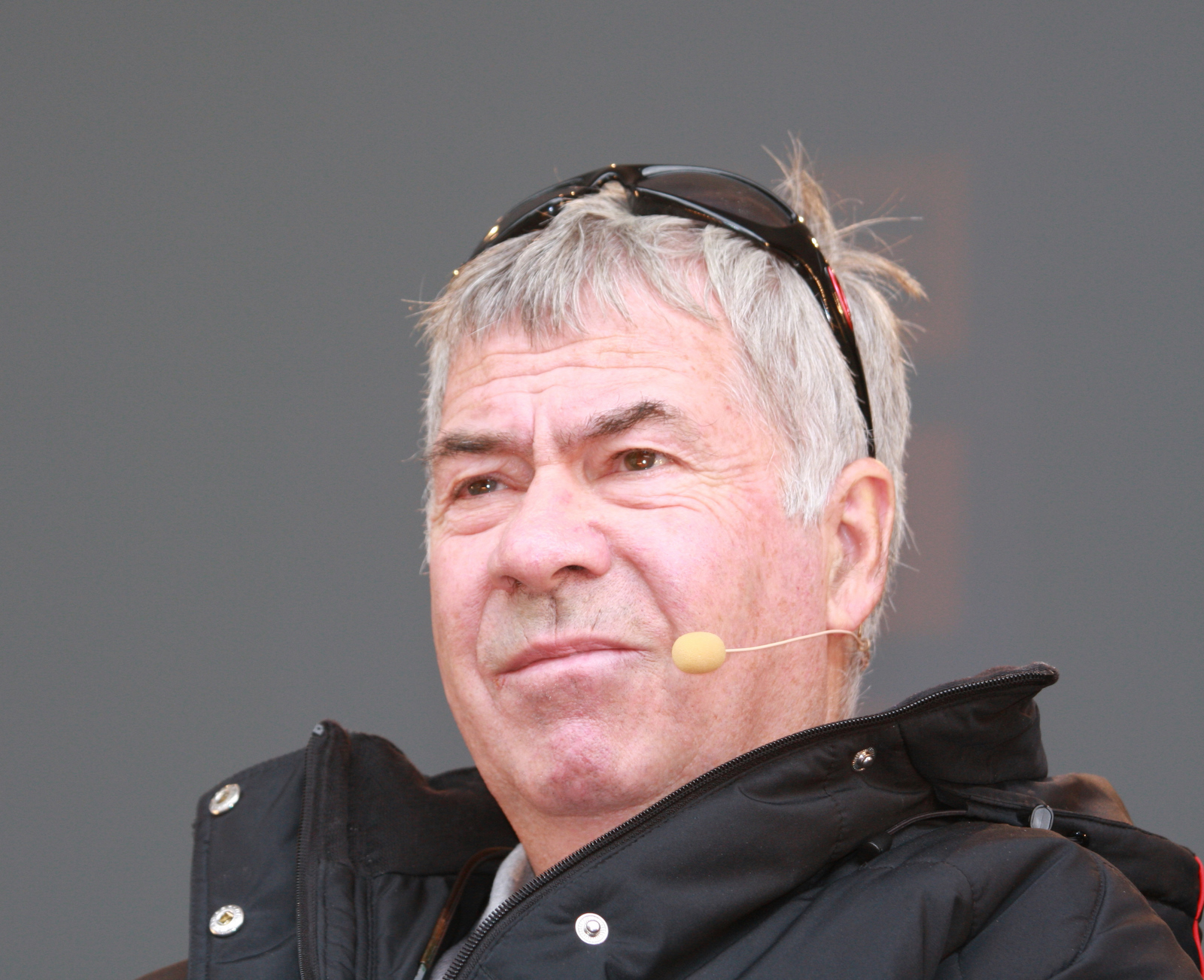
- Olsen in 2010

Personal information
- Full name: Egil Roger Olsen
- Date of birth: 22 April 1942 (age 84)
- Place of birth: Fredrikstad, Norway
- Position: Winger

Senior career*
Years	Team	Apps	(Gls)
1958–1965	Østsiden		
1964	Vålerenga		
1966–1967	Vålerenga		
1968–1971	Sarpsborg		
1972–1974	Frigg		
1975	Hasle-Løren		

International career
1964–1971	Norway	16	(0)

Managerial career
- 1972–1973: Frigg
- 1974: Frigg
- 1975: Hasle-Løren
- 1976: Østsiden
- 1977: Fossum
- 1978–1979: Frigg
- 1979–1985: Norway U21
- 1981–1983: Frigg
- 1985–1988: Lyn
- 1989: Aalesund
- 1990: Norway U23
- 1990–1998: Norway
- 1998–1999: Vålerenga
- 1999–2000: Wimbledon
- 2002–2003: Norway U19
- 2004–2005: Fredrikstad
- 2007–2008: Iraq
- 2009–2013: Norway
- * Club domestic league appearances and goals

Egil Roger Olsen (born 22 April 1942), nicknamed Drillo, is a Norwegian former football manager and player. He is best known as a highly successful manager of the Norway national team. He also served as the manager of the Iraq national team; his departure from the role attracted considerable attention. In January 2009, he returned as manager for the Norway national team, serving until 2013.

== Club career ==
Olsen was a successful player, a winger, with 16 caps for the national team, earning the nickname "Drillo" from his dribbling skills and technical ability. According to close friend and national teammate Nils Arne Eggen, Olsen would have been awarded with more caps as a player, had it not been for Willi Kment, Norway's manager at the time, who did not approve of Olsen's long hair and generally scruffy appearance, as well as his left-wing political views. Olsen was also a formidable bandy player while playing football.

== Managerial career ==
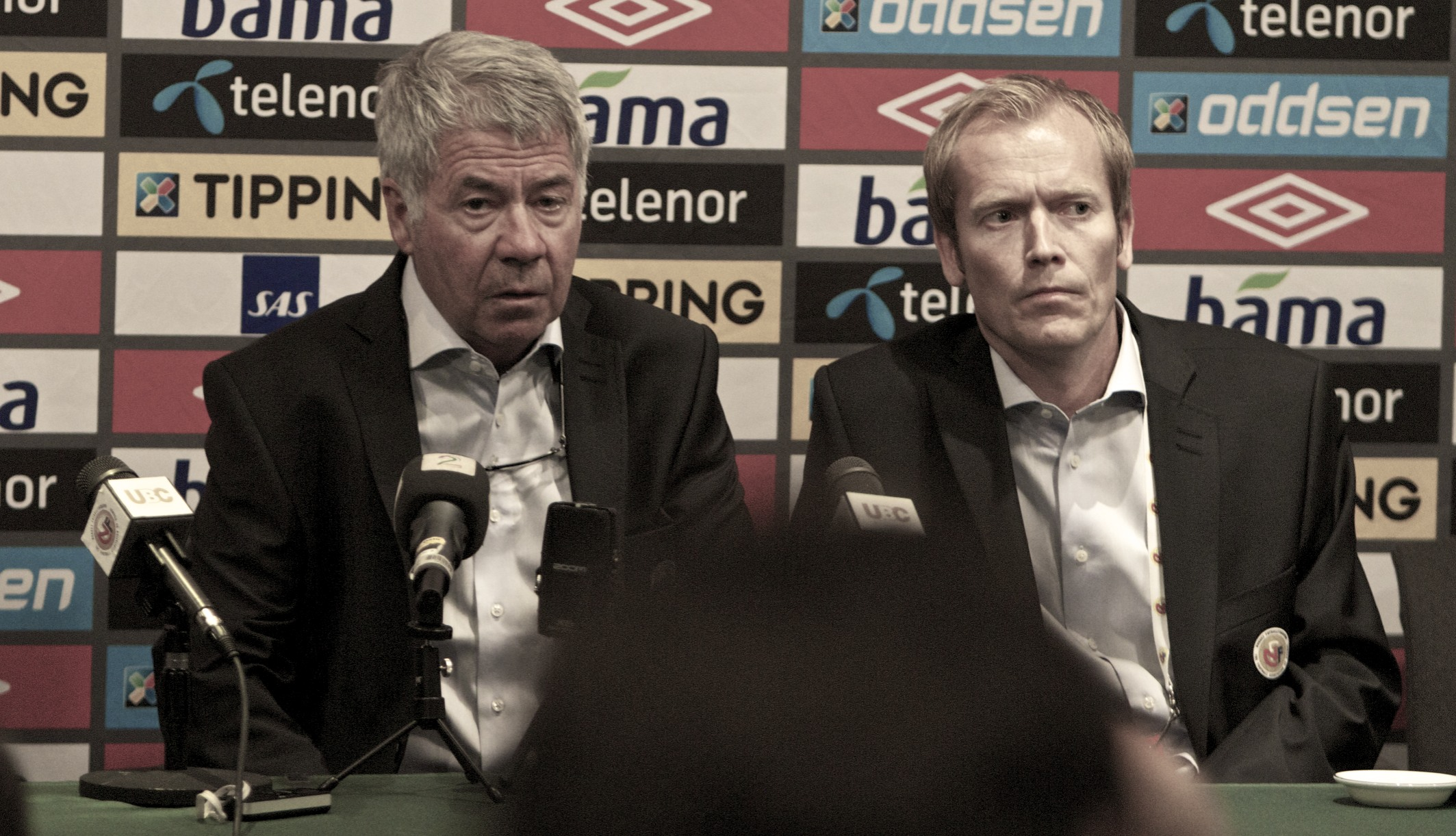
Olsen speaking to the press following a 2012 friendly match between Norway and England

Olsen managed the Norway national team from 1990 to 1998, guiding them to World Cup final tournaments in 1994 and 1998, with Norway peaking at number two on the FIFA ranking. He worked from 2005 to 2007 as an analyst for Vålerengens IF before joining Expekt.com.

In 1995, as Norway manager, Egil Olsen used one of his three votes to nominate Norway women's football star Hege Riise as the FIFA World Player of the Year. This was the first time a woman player had been nominated in what is seen as a men's football award.

In June 1999, the then 57-year-old Olsen made his appearance in English football, when he was named as manager of Wimbledon. He reportedly turned down an approach from Celtic to take charge of the London club, becoming the first Norwegian to manage in the Premier League. Olsen has stated that his favorite player at the club was Welsh international Ben Thatcher. He remained in charge for less than a year and was sacked just before the club was relegated from the Premier League, having been top division members since 1986. Club captain Robbie Earle said that "Olsen just didn't know how to get the best out of us".

On 19 May 2007, Olsen rejected an offer to manage the Iraq national team citing a busy schedule. However, the Iraqi football president vowed not to give up on his signature and on 17 September, Olsen signed a three-year contract. In February 2008, Iraq sacked Olsen without telling him. He had tried to contact them by several means, but received the message when a new manager was installed, this action on the Iraqi's part was very unexpected and their reason was said to be that they did not believe Olsen was strict enough.

On 14 January 2009, it was announced that Olsen would once again manage the Norway national team in an interim period until a successor for Åge Hareide could be found.

In their first game under his management, they beat Germany 1–0 in a friendly away game in Düsseldorf. It is the first time Norway has won against Germany, since the 1936 Summer Olympics in Berlin.

With Olsen as manager Norway rose from No. 59 in 2009 to No. 11 in 2011 on the FIFA rankings.

On 27 September 2013, Olsen agreed to stand down as coach following the World Cup qualifying at home defeat to Switzerland.

== Football philosophy ==
Olsen has at times been referred to as a "football professor" for his scientific approach to the game, an early user of video analysis of matches. He has collected statistical data to find out which playing styles are the most efficient. As Norway manager, he argued that as Norway didn't have the players to beat the best teams, they needed a smarter playing style than them, and one that fit Norway's skills.

He found that breakaways played an important role in making goals, and that quick counter-attacks caught opponents off guard to organize defense. Olsen believes that getting the ball down the field through the air to the attackers or flank players gave less chance for losing control. His use of a player with good heading abilities as a target man on the flank, such as Jostein Flo, was a major break with the established idea that all flank players should be small, quick and good dribblers.

He is opposed to stationary offensive players, and argues that offensive runs (also for players that do not possess the ball) should be carried out as often as possible when one's team has the ball, as multiple simultaneous runs are very difficult to defend against. He also holds the idea that breakthrough passes to the area behind the opponent's defensive line should be sought out very often, and that frequent offensive runs towards this area is important. He also coined the phrase "å være best uten ball" (roughly "to be best at off-the-ball running", lit. "to be best without the ball") which gained some fame in Norway. It was originally said about Øyvind Leonhardsen, a player doing an exceptional number of runs during games.

Olsen is also an ardent supporter of zone defense, as opposed to man-to-man marking. He also argues that players with extreme skills (extremely fast, extremely good headers, extremely good dribblers, extremely good passers etc.), as opposed to players with only good all-round skills, are important in football.

His long-ball philosophy, use of the 4–5–1 system and his teams' often extremely successful defending was considered extremely boring by some, but Olsen's direct attacking style would also be praised whenever it was successful - notably in Norway's wins against Brazil in 1997 and 1998.

His thoughts, together with those of Nils Arne Eggen, have had a strong impact on Norwegian football.

== Personal life ==
Olsen was a member of the Norwegian Workers' Communist Party (known as AKP (m-l)). He is also known for his immense knowledge of geographical trivia, as evidenced by his 2002 published factbook Drillos Verden (English: Drillo's World) published by Erling Kagge's publishing house Kagge Forlag (ISBN 9788248902447 Norway).

== Managerial statistics ==
As of 15 October 2013.

Team	Nat	From	To	Record							
Team	Nat	From	To	G	W	D	L	GF	GA	+/-	Win %
Lyn	(Norway)	1985	1988								
Aalesund	(Norway)	1989	1989								
Norway U23	(Norway)	1990	1990								
Norway	(Norway)	11 October 1990	30 June 1998	88	46	26	16	168	63	+105	52.27
Vålerenga	(Norway)	1998	1999	20	11	1	8				55
Wimbledon	(England)	9 June 1999	1 May 2000	43	11	12	20	55	80	–25	25.58
Norway U19	(Norway)	2002	2003	7	4	2	1	8	6	+2	57.14
Fredrikstad	(Norway)	2004	2005	26	8	7	11	35	44	–9	30.77
Iraq	(Iraq)	2007	2008	6	2	3	1	12	5	+7	33.33
Norway	(Norway)	14 January 2009	27 September 2013	50	25	9	16	63	50	+13	50
Total				240	107	60	73	341	248	+93	44.58
