= Brazil at the 1998 FIFA World Cup =

Matches of the Brazil national football team in the 1998 FIFA World Cup

At the 1998 FIFA World Cup, Brazil participated for the 16th time in the event. The country remained as the only national team to have participated in every installment of the FIFA World Cup. Brazil reached the final where they were defeated 3-0 by France.

== Squad ==
Head coach: Mário Zagallo

No.	Pos.	Player	Date of birth (age)	Caps	Club
1	GK	Cláudio Taffarel	8 May 1966 (aged 32)		(Brazil) Atlético Mineiro
2	DF	Cafu	7 June 1970 (aged 28)		(Italy) Roma
3	DF	Aldair	30 November 1965 (aged 32)		(Italy) Roma
4	DF	Júnior Baiano	14 March 1970 (aged 28)		(Brazil) Flamengo
5	MF	César Sampaio	31 March 1968 (aged 30)		(Japan) Yokohama Flügels
6	DF	Roberto Carlos	10 April 1973 (aged 25)		(Spain) Real Madrid
7	MF	Giovanni	4 February 1972 (aged 26)		(Spain) Barcelona
8	MF	Dunga (Captain)	31 October 1963 (aged 34)		(Japan) Júbilo Iwata
9	FW	Ronaldo	22 September 1976 (aged 21)		(Italy) Internazionale
10	MF	Rivaldo	19 April 1972 (aged 26)		(Spain) Barcelona
11	MF	Emerson	4 April 1976 (aged 22)		(Germany) Bayer Leverkusen
12	GK	Carlos Germano	14 August 1970 (aged 27)		(Brazil) Vasco da Gama
13	DF	Zé Carlos	14 November 1968 (aged 29)		(Brazil) São Paulo
14	DF	Gonçalves	22 February 1966 (aged 32)		(Brazil) Botafogo
15	DF	André Cruz	20 September 1968 (aged 29)		(Italy) Milan
16	MF	Zé Roberto	6 July 1974 (aged 23)		(Brazil) Flamengo
17	MF	Doriva	28 May 1972 (aged 26)		(Portugal) Porto
18	MF	Leonardo	5 September 1969 (aged 28)		(Italy) Milan
19	MF	Denílson	24 August 1977 (aged 20)		(Brazil) São Paulo
20	FW	Bebeto	16 February 1964 (aged 34)		(Brazil) Botafogo
21	FW	Edmundo	2 April 1971 (aged 27)		(Italy) Fiorentina
22	GK	Dida	7 October 1973 (aged 24)		(Brazil) Cruzeiro

== Group matches ==
=== Brazil vs Scotland ===
10 June 1998
17:30

Brazil	2–1	Scotland
Sampaio 4'; Boyd 73' (o.g.)	Report	Collins 38' (pen.)

Stade de France, Saint-Denis
Attendance: 80,000
Referee: José Garcia Aranda (Spain)

Brazil	Scotland

GK	1	Cláudio Taffarel
RB	2	Cafu
CB	3	Aldair	(yellow card) 45+2'
CB	4	Júnior Baiano
LB	6	Roberto Carlos
CM	5	César Sampaio	(yellow card) 37'
CM	8	Dunga (c)
AM	7	Giovanni		(substituted off) 45'
AM	10	Rivaldo
CF	9	Ronaldo
CF	20	Bebeto		(substituted off) 70'
Substitutions:
MF	18	Leonardo		(substituted on) 45'
FW	19	Denílson		(substituted on) 70'
Manager:
Mário Zagallo

GK	1	Jim Leighton
RWB	8	Craig Burley
CB	3	Tom Boyd
CB	4	Colin Calderwood
CB	5	Colin Hendry (c)
LWB	22	Christian Dailly		(substituted off) 85'
CM	14	Paul Lambert
CM	10	Darren Jackson
CM	11	John Collins
CF	7	Kevin Gallacher
CF	9	Gordon Durie	(yellow card) 25'	(substituted off) 79'
Substitutions:
MF	17	Billy McKinlay		(substituted on) 79'
DF	6	Tosh McKinlay		(substituted on) 85'
Manager:
Craig Brown

Assistant referees:
Fernando Tresaco Gracia (Spain)
Jorge Luis Arango (Colombia)
Fourth official:
Gamal Al-Ghandour (Egypt)

=== Brazil vs Morocco ===
16 June 1998
21:00

Brazil	3–0	Morocco
Ronaldo 9'; Rivaldo 45+2'; Bebeto 50'	Report

Stade de la Beaujoire, Nantes
Attendance: 35,500
Referee: Nikolai Levnikov (Russia)

Brazil	Morocco

GK	1	Cláudio Taffarel
DF	2	Cafu
DF	3	Aldair
DF	4	Júnior Baiano	(yellow card) 87'
MF	5	César Sampaio	(yellow card) 36'	(substituted off) 68'
DF	6	Roberto Carlos
MF	8	Dunga (c)
FW	9	Ronaldo
MF	10	Rivaldo		(substituted off) 87'
MF	18	Leonardo
FW	20	Bebeto		(substituted off) 72'
Substitutions:
MF	17	Doriva		(substituted on) 68'
FW	21	Edmundo		(substituted on) 72'
FW	19	Denílson		(substituted on) 87'
Manager:
Mário Zagallo

GK	12	Driss Benzekri
DF	2	Abdelilah Saber		(substituted off) 76'
DF	3	Abdelkrim El Hadrioui
DF	4	Youssef Rossi
DF	6	Noureddine Naybet (c)
MF	7	Mustapha Hadji
MF	8	Saïd Chiba	(yellow card) 64'	(substituted off) 76'
FW	9	Abdeljalil Hadda	(yellow card) 32'	(substituted off) 88'
FW	14	Salaheddine Bassir
MF	18	Youssef Chippo
DF	20	Tahar El Khalej
Substitutions:
DF	15	Lahcen Abrami		(substituted on) 76'
MF	17	Gharib Amzine		(substituted on) 76'
MF	11	Ali El Khattabi		(substituted on) 88'
Manager:
(France) Henri Michel

Assistant referees:
Yuri Dupanov (Belarus)
Mark Warren (England)
Fourth official:
Paul Durkin (England)

=== Brazil vs Norway ===
23 June 1998
21:00

Brazil	1–2	Norway
Bebeto 78'	Report	T. A. Flo 83'; Rekdal 88' (pen.)

Stade Vélodrome, Marseille
Attendance: 55,000
Referee: Esfandiar Baharmast (United States)

Brazil	Norway

GK	1	Cláudio Taffarel
DF	2	Cafu
DF	4	Júnior Baiano
DF	6	Roberto Carlos
MF	8	Dunga (c)
FW	9	Ronaldo
MF	10	Rivaldo
DF	14	Gonçalves
MF	18	Leonardo
FW	19	Denílson
FW	20	Bebeto
Manager:
Mário Zagallo

GK	1	Frode Grodås (c)
DF	3	Ronny Johnsen
DF	4	Henning Berg
DF	5	Stig Inge Bjørnebye
MF	8	Øyvind Leonhardsen	(yellow card) 54'
FW	9	Tore André Flo
MF	10	Kjetil Rekdal
DF	15	Dan Eggen
FW	17	Håvard Flo		(substituted off) 68'
MF	21	Vidar Riseth		(substituted off) 79'
MF	22	Roar Strand		(substituted off) 45'
Substitutions:
MF	7	Erik Mykland	(yellow card) 59'	(substituted on) 45'
FW	20	Ole Gunnar Solskjær		(substituted on) 68'
MF	16	Jostein Flo		(substituted on) 79'
Manager:
Egil Olsen

Assistant referees:
Gennaro Mazzei (Italy)
Dramane Danté (Mali)
Fourth official:
Arturo Brizio Carter (Mexico)

== Second round ==
=== Brazil vs Chile ===
27 June 1998
21:00

Brazil	4–1	Chile
Sampaio 11', 27'; Ronaldo 45+1' (pen.), 70'	Report	Salas 68'

Parc des Princes, Paris
Attendance: 45,500
Referee: Marc Batta (France)

Brazil	Chile

GK	1	Cláudio Taffarel
RB	2	Cafu	(yellow card) 90+1'
CB	3	Aldair		(substituted off) 77'
CB	4	Junior Baiano
LB	6	Roberto Carlos
CM	5	César Sampaio
CM	8	Dunga (c)
AM	10	Rivaldo
AM	18	Leonardo	(yellow card) 45'
CF	20	Bebeto		(substituted off) 65'
CF	9	Ronaldo
Substitutes:
FW	19	Denílson		(substituted on) 65'
MF	14	Gonçalves		(substituted on) 77'
Manager:
Mário Zagallo

GK	1	Nelson Tapia	(yellow card) 45'
CB	6	Pedro Reyes
CB	3	Ronald Fuentes	(yellow card) 34'
CB	5	Javier Margas
RWB	19	Fernando Cornejo
LWB	16	Mauricio Aros
CM	8	Clarence Acuña		(substituted off) 80'
CM	14	Miguel Ramírez		(substituted off) 45'
AM	10	José Luis Sierra		(substituted off) 45'
CF	11	Marcelo Salas
CF	9	Iván Zamorano (c)
Substitutes:
MF	17	Marcelo Vega		(substituted on) 45'
MF	20	Fabián Estay		(substituted on) 45'
MF	18	Luis Musrri		(substituted on) 80'
Manager:
(Uruguay) Nelson Acosta

Assistant referees:
Jacques Poudevigne (France)
Owen Powell (Jamaica)
Fourth official:
Pirom Anprasert (Thailand)

== Quarter-final ==
=== Brazil vs Denmark ===
3 July 1998
21:00

Brazil	3–2	Denmark
Bebeto 10'; Rivaldo 25', 59'	Report	Jørgensen 2'; B. Laudrup 50'

Stade de la Beaujoire, Nantes
Attendance: 35,500
Referee: Gamal Al-Ghandour (Egypt)

Brazil	Denmark

GK	1	Cláudio Taffarel
RB	2	Cafu	(yellow card) 81'
CB	3	Aldair	(yellow card) 37'
CB	4	Junior Baiano
LB	6	Roberto Carlos	(yellow card) 11'
CM	5	César Sampaio
CM	8	Dunga (c)
AM	10	Rivaldo		(substituted off) 87'
AM	18	Leonardo		(substituted off) 71'
CF	20	Bebeto		(substituted off) 64'
CF	9	Ronaldo
Substitutes:
FW	19	Denílson		(substituted on) 64'
MF	11	Emerson		(substituted on) 71'
MF	16	Zé Roberto		(substituted on) 87'
Manager:
Mário Zagallo

GK	1	Peter Schmeichel
RB	12	Søren Colding	(yellow card) 39'
CB	3	Marc Rieper
CB	4	Jes Høgh
LB	5	Jan Heintze
CM	6	Thomas Helveg	(yellow card) 19'	(substituted off) 87'
CM	7	Allan Nielsen		(substituted off) 46'
RW	21	Martin Jørgensen
LW	10	Michael Laudrup (c)
SS	11	Brian Laudrup
CF	18	Peter Møller		(substituted off) 66'
Substitutes:
MF	15	Stig Tøfting	(yellow card) 72'	(substituted on) 46'
FW	19	Ebbe Sand		(substituted on) 66'
DF	2	Michael Schjønberg		(substituted on) 87'
Manager:
(Sweden) Bo Johansson

Assistant referees:
Mohamed Mansri (Tunisia)
Dramane Danté (Mali)
Fourth official:
Ali Bujsaim (United Arab Emirates)

== Semi-final ==
=== Brazil vs Netherlands ===
7 July 1998
21:00

Brazil	1–1 (a.e.t.)	Netherlands
Ronaldo 46'	Report	Kluivert 87'
Penalties
Ronaldo (penalty scored); Rivaldo (penalty scored); Emerson (penalty scored); Dunga (penalty scored)	4–2	(penalty scored) F. de Boer; (penalty scored) Bergkamp; (penalty missed) Cocu; (penalty missed) R. de Boer

Stade Vélodrome, Marseille
Attendance: 54,000
Referee: Ali Bujsaim (United Arab Emirates)

Brazil	Netherlands

GK	1	Cláudio Taffarel
RB	13	Zé Carlos	(yellow card) 31'
CB	3	Aldair
CB	4	Junior Baiano
LB	6	Roberto Carlos
CM	5	César Sampaio	(yellow card) 45'
CM	8	Dunga (c)
AM	10	Rivaldo
AM	18	Leonardo		(substituted off) 85'
CF	20	Bebeto		(substituted off) 70'
CF	9	Ronaldo
Substitutes:
FW	19	Denílson		(substituted on) 70'
MF	11	Emerson		(substituted on) 85'
Manager:
Mário Zagallo

GK	1	Edwin van der Sar
RB	2	Michael Reiziger	(yellow card) 48'	(substituted off) 56'
CB	3	Jaap Stam
CB	4	Frank de Boer (c)
LB	11	Philip Cocu
CM	6	Wim Jonk		(substituted off) 111'
CM	16	Edgar Davids	(yellow card) 60'
RW	7	Ronald de Boer
LW	12	Boudewijn Zenden		(substituted off) 75'
SS	8	Dennis Bergkamp
CF	9	Patrick Kluivert
Substitutes:
MF	20	Aron Winter		(substituted on) 56'
FW	17	Pierre van Hooijdonk	(yellow card) 90'	(substituted on) 75'
MF	10	Clarence Seedorf	(yellow card) 119'	(substituted on) 111'
Manager:
Guus Hiddink

Assistant referees:
Hussain Ghadanfari (Kuwait)
Mohamed Al Musawi (Oman)
Fourth official:
Rahman Al Zaid (Saudi Arabia)

== Final ==
12 July 1998
21:00

Brazil	0–3	France
	Report	Zidane 27', 45+1'; Petit 90+3'

Stade de France, Saint-Denis
Attendance: 80,000
Referee: Said Belqola (Morocco)

Brazil	France

GK	1	Cláudio Taffarel
RB	2	Cafu
CB	3	Aldair
CB	4	Junior Baiano	(yellow card) 33'
LB	6	Roberto Carlos
CM	5	César Sampaio		(substituted off) 73'
CM	8	Dunga (c)
AM	10	Rivaldo
AM	18	Leonardo		(substituted off) 46'
CF	20	Bebeto
CF	9	Ronaldo
Substitutes:
MF	19	Denílson		(substituted on) 46'
FW	21	Edmundo		(substituted on) 73'
Manager:
Mario Zagallo

GK	16	Fabien Barthez
RB	15	Lilian Thuram
CB	8	Marcel Desailly	(yellow card) 48' (yellow-red card) 68'
CB	18	Frank Lebœuf
LB	3	Bixente Lizarazu
DM	7	Didier Deschamps (c)	(yellow card) 39'
CM	17	Emmanuel Petit
CM	19	Christian Karembeu	(yellow card) 56'	(substituted off) 57'
CM	10	Zinedine Zidane
AM	6	Youri Djorkaeff		(substituted off) 74'
CF	9	Stéphane Guivarc'h		(substituted off) 66'
Substitutes:
MF	14	Alain Boghossian		(substituted on) 57'
FW	21	Christophe Dugarry		(substituted on) 66'
MF	4	Patrick Vieira		(substituted on) 74'
Manager:
Aime Jacquet

Assistant referees:
Mark Warren (England)
Achmat Salie (South Africa)
Fourth official:
Rahman Al Zaid (Saudi Arabia)
