= 1998 FIFA World Cup knockout stage =

Football tournament

The 1998 FIFA World Cup knockout stage covers the games from the second round through to the final at the 1998 FIFA World Cup in France. The top two teams from each of the eight groups qualified for the knockout stage. Teams played one game against each other, with the possibility of extra time and penalties if a winner could not be determined after 90 minutes.

== Qualified teams ==
The top two placed teams from each of the eight groups qualified for the knockout stage.

Group	Winners	Runners-up
A	Brazil	Norway
B	Italy	Chile
C	France	Denmark
D	Nigeria	Paraguay
E	Netherlands	Mexico
F	Germany	FR Yugoslavia
G	Romania	England
H	Argentina	Croatia

== Bracket ==
The first games were played on 27 June 1998, and the final took place on 12 July 1998 in Paris.

Round of 16
27 June – Paris
Brazil	4
Chile	1
28 June – Saint-Denis
Nigeria	1
Denmark	4
29 June – Toulouse
Netherlands	2
FR Yugoslavia	1
30 June – Saint-Étienne
Argentina (p)	2 (4)
England	2 (3)
27 June – Marseille
Italy	1
Norway	0
28 June – Lens
France (g.g.)	1
Paraguay	0
29 June – Montpellier
Germany	2
Mexico	1
30 June – Bordeaux
Romania	0
Croatia	1

Quarter-finals
3 July – Nantes
Brazil	3
Denmark	2
4 July – Marseille
Netherlands	2
Argentina	1
3 July – Saint-Denis
Italy	0 (3)
France (p)	0 (4)
4 July – Lyon
Germany	0
Croatia	3

Semi-finals
7 July – Marseille
Brazil (p)	1 (4)
Netherlands	1 (2)
8 July – Saint-Denis
France	2
Croatia	1

Final
12 July – Saint-Denis
Brazil	0
France	3
Match for third place
11 July – Paris
Netherlands	1
Croatia	2

== Round of 16 ==
=== Italy vs Norway ===
Christian Vieri scored his fifth goal of the finals and the only one of the game in the 18th minute with exquisite precision, bursting on to Luigi Di Biagio's pass 40 yards from goal. Norway had their moments but failed to finish as Gianluca Pagliuca made some brilliant saves.

27 June 1998
16:30 CEST (UTC+2)

Italy	1–0	Norway
Vieri 18'

Stade Vélodrome, Marseille
Attendance: 55,000
Referee: Bernd Heynemann (Germany)

Italy	Norway

GK	12	Gianluca Pagliuca
RB	2	Giuseppe Bergomi
CB	4	Fabio Cannavaro
CB	5	Alessandro Costacurta
LB	3	Paolo Maldini (c)	(yellow card) 89'
RM	17	Francesco Moriero	(yellow card) 38'	(substituted off) 63'
CM	9	Demetrio Albertini		(substituted off) 72'
CM	14	Luigi Di Biagio	(yellow card) 84'
LM	11	Dino Baggio
SS	10	Alessandro Del Piero		(substituted off) 77'
CF	21	Christian Vieri
Substitutes:
RM	15	Angelo Di Livio		(substituted on) 63'
LM	7	Gianluca Pessotto		(substituted on) 72'
FW	20	Enrico Chiesa		(substituted on) 77'
Manager:
Cesare Maldini

GK	1	Frode Grodås (c)
RB	4	Henning Berg
CB	15	Dan Eggen
CB	3	Ronny Johnsen
LB	5	Stig Inge Bjørnebye
RM	17	Håvard Flo	(yellow card) 35'	(substituted off) 73'
CM	7	Erik Mykland	(yellow card) 54'
CM	10	Kjetil Rekdal	(yellow card) 62'
CM	8	Øyvind Leonhardsen		(substituted off) 13'
LM	21	Vidar Riseth
CF	9	Tore André Flo
Substitutes:
MF	22	Roar Strand		(substituted on) 13'	(substituted off) 39'
MF	6	Ståle Solbakken		(substituted on) 39'
FW	20	Ole Gunnar Solskjær		(substituted on) 73'
Manager:
Egil Olsen

Assistant referees:
Erich Schneider (Germany)
Marc Van den Broeck (Belgium)
Fourth official:
László Vágner (Hungary)

=== Brazil vs Chile ===
27 June 1998
21:00 CEST (UTC+2)

Brazil	4–1	Chile
César Sampaio 11', 26'; Ronaldo 45+3' (pen.), 72'		Salas 70'

Parc des Princes, Paris
Attendance: 45,500
Referee: Marc Batta (France)

Brazil	Chile

GK	1	Cláudio Taffarel
RB	2	Cafu	(yellow card) 90+1'
CB	3	Aldair		(substituted off) 78'
CB	4	Júnior Baiano
LB	6	Roberto Carlos
CM	5	César Sampaio
CM	8	Dunga (c)
AM	10	Rivaldo
AM	18	Leonardo	(yellow card) 45'
CF	20	Bebeto		(substituted off) 65'
CF	9	Ronaldo
Substitutes:
FW	19	Denílson		(substituted on) 65'
MF	14	Gonçalves		(substituted on) 78'
Manager:
Mário Zagallo

GK	1	Nelson Tapia	(yellow card) 45'
CB	6	Pedro Reyes
CB	3	Ronald Fuentes	(yellow card) 34'
CB	5	Javier Margas
RWB	19	Fernando Cornejo
LWB	16	Mauricio Aros
CM	8	Clarence Acuña		(substituted off) 80'
CM	14	Miguel Ramírez		(substituted off) 46'
AM	10	José Luis Sierra		(substituted off) 46'
CF	11	Marcelo Salas
CF	9	Iván Zamorano (c)
Substitutes:
MF	17	Marcelo Vega		(substituted on) 46'
MF	20	Fabián Estay		(substituted on) 46'
MF	18	Luis Musrri		(substituted on) 80'
Manager:
(Uruguay) Nelson Acosta

Assistant referees:
Jacques Poudevigne (France)
Owen Powell (Jamaica)
Fourth official:
Pirom Un-prasert (Thailand)

=== France vs Paraguay ===
28 June 1998
16:30 CEST (UTC+2)

France	1–0 (a.e.t./g.g.)	Paraguay
Blanc 114'

Stade Félix-Bollaert, Lens
Attendance: 31,800
Referee: Ali Bujsaim (United Arab Emirates)

France	Paraguay

GK	16	Fabien Barthez
RB	15	Lilian Thuram
CB	5	Laurent Blanc
CB	8	Marcel Desailly
LB	3	Bixente Lizarazu
CM	7	Didier Deschamps (c)
CM	17	Emmanuel Petit	(substituted off) 69'
RW	13	Bernard Diomède	(substituted off) 76'
LW	6	Youri Djorkaeff
CF	20	David Trezeguet
CF	12	Thierry Henry	(substituted off) 64'
Substitutes:
MF	11	Robert Pires	(substituted on) 64'
MF	14	Alain Boghossian	(substituted on) 69'
FW	9	Stéphane Guivarc'h	(substituted on) 76'
Manager:
Aimé Jacquet

GK	1	José Luis Chilavert (c)	(yellow card) 19'
RB	2	Francisco Arce	(yellow card) 84'
CB	4	Carlos Gamarra
CB	5	Celso Ayala
LB	11	Pedro Sarabia
CM	10	Roberto Acuña
CM	16	Julio César Enciso	(yellow card) 32'
CM	13	Carlos Humberto Paredes		(substituted off) 75'
AM	21	Jorge Luis Campos		(substituted off) 55'
AM	15	Miguel Ángel Benítez	(yellow card) 23'
CF	9	José Cardozo		(substituted off) 91'
Substitutes:
MF	7	Julio César Yegros		(substituted on) 55'
DF	20	Denis Caniza		(substituted on) 75'
MF	8	Aristides Rojas	(yellow card) 99'	(substituted on) 91'
Manager:
(Brazil) Paulo César Carpegiani

Assistant referees:
Nimal Wickeramatunge (Sri Lanka)
Lencie Fred (Vanuatu)
Fourth official:
Esse Baharmast (United States)

=== Nigeria vs Denmark ===
28 June 1998
21:00 CEST (UTC+2)

Nigeria	1–4	Denmark
Babangida 77'		Møller 3'; B. Laudrup 12'; Sand 58'; Helveg 76'

Stade de France, Saint-Denis
Attendance: 77,000
Referee: Urs Meier (Switzerland)

Nigeria	Denmark

GK	1	Peter Rufai
RB	8	Mutiu Adepoju
CB	5	Uche Okechukwu (c)
CB	6	Taribo West
LB	3	Celestine Babayaro
DM	15	Sunday Oliseh
RM	7	Finidi George
LM	11	Garba Lawal		(substituted off) 73'
AM	10	Jay-Jay Okocha	(yellow card) 49'
SS	4	Nwankwo Kanu		(substituted off) 65'
CF	20	Victor Ikpeba
Substitutes:
FW	9	Rashidi Yekini		(substituted on) 65'
DF	13	Tijani Babangida		(substituted on) 73'
Manager:
(Federal Republic of Yugoslavia) Bora Milutinović

GK	1	Peter Schmeichel
RB	12	Søren Colding
CB	3	Marc Rieper	(yellow card) 24'
CB	4	Jes Høgh
LB	5	Jan Heintze
CM	6	Thomas Helveg
CM	7	Allan Nielsen
RW	21	Martin Jørgensen
LW	10	Michael Laudrup (c)		(substituted off) 84'
SS	11	Brian Laudrup		(substituted off) 78'
CF	18	Peter Møller		(substituted off) 58'
Substitutes:
FW	19	Ebbe Sand		(substituted on) 58'
MF	14	Morten Wieghorst		(substituted on) 78'
MF	8	Per Frandsen		(substituted on) 84'
Manager:
(Sweden) Bo Johansson

Assistant referees:
Hussain Ghadanfari (Kuwait)
Fernando Tresaco Gracia (Spain)
Fourth official:
Rahman Al Zaid (Saudi Arabia)

=== Germany vs Mexico ===
29 June 1998
16:30 CEST (UTC+2)

Germany	2–1	Mexico
Klinsmann 74'; Bierhoff 86'		Hernández 47'

Stade de la Mosson, Montpellier
Attendance: 29,800
Referee: Vítor Melo Pereira (Portugal)

Germany	Mexico

GK	1	Andreas Köpke
SW	8	Lothar Matthäus	(yellow card) 56'
CB	14	Markus Babbel	(yellow card) 45+1'
CB	2	Christian Wörns
RWB	3	Jörg Heinrich		(substituted off) 57'
LWB	21	Michael Tarnat	(yellow card) 77'
CM	16	Dietmar Hamann	(yellow card) 88'
DM	5	Thomas Helmer		(substituted off) 37'
CM	10	Thomas Häßler		(substituted off) 73'
CF	20	Oliver Bierhoff
CF	18	Jürgen Klinsmann (c)
Substitutes:
MF	17	Christian Ziege		(substituted on) 37'
MF	7	Andreas Möller		(substituted on) 57'
FW	9	Ulf Kirsten		(substituted on) 73'
Manager:
Berti Vogts

GK	1	Jorge Campos
CB	13	Pável Pardo
CB	5	Duilio Davino	(yellow card) 57'
CB	2	Claudio Suárez
RM	6	Marcelino Bernal		(substituted off) 46'
CM	14	Raúl Lara
CM	4	Germán Villa
LM	8	Alberto García Aspe (c)		(substituted off) 86'
RF	11	Cuauhtémoc Blanco	(yellow card) 87'
CF	15	Luis Hernández
LF	17	Francisco Palencia		(substituted off) 53'
Substitutes:
RB	18	Salvador Carmona		(substituted on) 46'
LM	21	Jesús Arellano		(substituted on) 53'
LF	9	Ricardo Peláez		(substituted on) 86'
Manager:
Manuel Lapuente

Assistant referees:
Mohamed Mansri (Tunisia)
Achmat Salie (South Africa)
Fourth official:
Masayoshi Okada (Japan)

=== Netherlands vs FR Yugoslavia ===
Just three minutes after Slobodan Komljenović scored the equalizer, Predrag Mijatović missed a penalty kick as, after deciding not to hit it to the sides due to Edwin van der Sar's reach, the ball hit the crossbar, prompting him to describe it as the worst moment in his career. Edgar Davids scored the winning goal for the Netherlands in injury time; Davids, suffering a cramp, had asked to be substituted moments before but Guus Hiddink asked him to stay in the field. An apparent scuffle between Van der Sar and Winston Bogarde in the celebration was explained by the former as an instinctive overreaction from being unintentionally choked by Pierre van Hooijdonk.

29 June 1998
21:00 CEST (UTC+2)

Netherlands	2–1	FR Yugoslavia
Bergkamp 38'; Davids 90+2'		Komljenović 48'

Stade de Toulouse, Toulouse
Attendance: 33,500
Referee: José María García-Aranda (Spain)

Netherlands	Yugoslavia

GK	1	Edwin van der Sar
RB	2	Michael Reiziger
CB	3	Jaap Stam
CB	4	Frank de Boer (c)
LB	5	Arthur Numan
CM	16	Edgar Davids
CM	10	Clarence Seedorf
CM	11	Phillip Cocu
RW	7	Ronald de Boer
LW	14	Marc Overmars
CF	8	Dennis Bergkamp
Manager:
Guus Hiddink

GK	1	Ivica Kralj
RB	2	Zoran Mirković	(yellow card) 52'
CB	13	Slobodan Komljenović
CB	11	Siniša Mihajlović		(substituted off) 78'
CB	3	Goran Đorović	(yellow card) 73'
LB	16	Željko Petrović
CM	4	Slaviša Jokanović
CM	6	Branko Brnović
RM	10	Dragan Stojković (c)	(yellow card) 38'	(substituted off) 57'
LM	7	Vladimir Jugović
CF	9	Predrag Mijatović
Substitutes:
MF	8	Dejan Savićević		(substituted on) 57'
DF	14	Niša Saveljić		(substituted on) 78'
Manager:
Slobodan Santrač

Assistant referees:
Laurent Rausis (Switzerland)
Nicolae Grigorescu (Romania)
Fourth official:
Hugh Dallas (Scotland)

=== Romania vs Croatia ===
Croatia's winning penalty goal had to be retaken. Davor Šuker scored both times to extend Croatia's debut World Cup run to the quarter-finals.

30 June 1998
16:30 CEST (UTC+2)

Romania	0–1	Croatia
		Šuker 45+2' (pen.)

Parc Lescure, Bordeaux
Attendance: 31,800
Referee: Javier Castrilli (Argentina)

Romania	Croatia

GK	12	Bogdan Stelea
SW	6	Gheorghe Popescu	(yellow card) 43'
CB	18	Iulian Filipescu
CB	13	Liviu Ciobotariu
RWB	2	Dan Petrescu	(yellow card) 70'	(substituted off) 76'
LWB	8	Dorinel Munteanu
DM	5	Constantin Gâlcă
CM	16	Gabriel Popescu		(substituted off) 61'
AM	10	Gheorghe Hagi (c)		(substituted off) 56'
SS	11	Adrian Ilie	(yellow card) 81'
CF	9	Viorel Moldovan
Substitutes:
FW	21	Gheorghe Craioveanu		(substituted on) 56'
MF	14	Radu Niculescu		(substituted on) 61'
MF	15	Lucian Marinescu		(substituted on) 76'
Manager:
Anghel Iordănescu

GK	1	Dražen Ladić
SW	4	Igor Štimac
CB	20	Dario Šimić
CB	6	Slaven Bilić	(yellow card) 70'
RWB	13	Mario Stanić		(substituted off) 83'
LWB	17	Robert Jarni
DM	21	Krunoslav Jurčić
CM	7	Aljoša Asanović
CM	10	Zvonimir Boban (c)	(yellow card) 27'
CF	19	Goran Vlaović		(substituted off) 76'
CF	9	Davor Šuker
Substitutes:
FW	2	Petar Krpan		(substituted on) 76'
DF	15	Igor Tudor		(substituted on) 83'
Manager:
Miroslav Blažević

Assistant referees:
Claudio Rossi (Argentina)
Arnaldo Pinto (Brazil)
Fourth official:
Lim Kee Chong (Mauritius)

=== Argentina vs England ===
Argentina decided to use their change kit, feeling that it had granted them luck in the 1986 World Cup quarter-final between the two sides. All four goals were scored in the first half, making it the first match in the tournament with as many goals scored before half-time. With the score tied at 2–2, David Beckham retaliated after being fouled by Diego Simeone and was sent off. Beckham's teammate Michael Owen subsequently described Beckham's act as "childish and unnecessary", although Owen also said that the burnings of effigies of Beckham were undeserved. In the subsequent penalty shoot-out, Argentina went first. David Seaman saved Argentina's second penalty from Hernán Crespo to give England the advantage, but that was immediately cancelled when Carlos Roa saved from Paul Ince. The tie ended with another Roa save, from David Batty. Batty said it was the first penalty he had ever taken. England had also exited on penalties in the recent UEFA Euro 1996 two years prior.

30 June 1998
21:00 CEST (UTC+2)

Argentina	2–2 (a.e.t.)	England
Batistuta 5' (pen.); Zanetti 45+1'		Shearer 9' (pen.); Owen 16'
Penalties
Berti (penalty scored); Crespo (penalty missed); Verón (penalty scored); Gallardo (penalty scored); Ayala (penalty scored)	4–3	(penalty scored) Shearer; (penalty missed) Ince; (penalty scored) Merson; (penalty scored) Owen; (penalty missed) Batty

Stade Geoffroy-Guichard, Saint-Étienne
Attendance: 30,600
Referee: Kim Milton Nielsen (Denmark)

Argentina	England

GK	1	Carlos Roa	(yellow card) PSO
CB	14	Nelson Vivas
CB	2	Roberto Ayala
CB	3	José Chamot
RM	22	Javier Zanetti
DM	5	Matías Almeyda	(yellow card) 73'
LM	8	Diego Simeone (c)	(yellow card) 47'	(substituted off) 91'
CM	11	Juan Sebastián Verón	(yellow card) 44'
AM	10	Ariel Ortega
SS	7	Claudio López		(substituted off) 68'
CF	9	Gabriel Batistuta		(substituted off) 68'
Substitutes:
FW	19	Hernán Crespo		(substituted on) 68'
MF	20	Marcelo Gallardo		(substituted on) 68'
MF	16	Sergio Berti		(substituted on) 91'
Manager:
Daniel Passarella

GK	1	David Seaman	(yellow card) 5'
RB	12	Gary Neville
CB	5	Tony Adams
CB	2	Sol Campbell
LB	3	Graeme Le Saux		(substituted off) 71'
DM	4	Paul Ince	(yellow card) 10'
RM	7	David Beckham	(red card) 47'
LM	14	Darren Anderton		(substituted off) 97'
AM	16	Paul Scholes		(substituted off) 78'
SS	20	Michael Owen
CF	9	Alan Shearer (c)
Substitutes:
DF	6	Gareth Southgate		(substituted on) 71'
MF	15	Paul Merson		(substituted on) 78'
MF	8	David Batty		(substituted on) 97'
Manager:
Glenn Hoddle

Assistant referees:
Halim Abdul Hamid (Malaysia)
Mohamed Al Musawi (Oman)
Fourth official:
Rune Pedersen (Norway)

== Quarter-finals ==
=== Italy vs France ===
3 July 1998
16:30 CEST (UTC+2)

Italy	0–0 (a.e.t.)	France
Penalties
R. Baggio (penalty scored); Albertini (penalty missed); Costacurta (penalty scored); Vieri (penalty scored); Di Biagio (penalty missed)	3–4	(penalty scored) Zidane; (penalty missed) Lizarazu; (penalty scored) Trezeguet; (penalty scored) Henry; (penalty scored) Blanc

Stade de France, Saint-Denis
Attendance: 77,000
Referee: Hugh Dallas (Scotland)

Italy	France

GK	12	Gianluca Pagliuca
RB	2	Giuseppe Bergomi	(yellow card) 28'
CB	4	Fabio Cannavaro
CB	5	Alessandro Costacurta	(yellow card) 113'
LB	3	Paolo Maldini (c)
RM	17	Francesco Moriero
CM	11	Dino Baggio		(substituted off) 52'
CM	14	Luigi Di Biagio
LM	7	Gianluca Pessotto		(substituted off) 90'
SS	10	Alessandro Del Piero	(yellow card) 26'	(substituted off) 67'
CF	21	Christian Vieri
Substitutes:
CM	9	Demetrio Albertini		(substituted on) 52'
FW	18	Roberto Baggio		(substituted on) 67'
RM	15	Angelo Di Livio		(substituted on) 90'
Manager:
Cesare Maldini

GK	16	Fabien Barthez
RB	15	Lilian Thuram
CB	5	Laurent Blanc
CB	8	Marcel Desailly
LB	3	Bixente Lizarazu
DM	7	Didier Deschamps (c)	(yellow card) 62'
RM	19	Christian Karembeu		(substituted off) 65'
LM	17	Emmanuel Petit
AM	10	Zinedine Zidane
CF	6	Youri Djorkaeff
CF	9	Stéphane Guivarc'h	(yellow card) 53'	(substituted off) 65'
Substitutes:
FW	12	Thierry Henry		(substituted on) 65'
FW	20	David Trezeguet		(substituted on) 65'
Manager:
Aimé Jacquet

Assistant referees:
Mark Warren (England)
Nicolae Grigorescu (Romania)
Fourth official:
Said Belqola (Morocco)

=== Brazil vs Denmark ===
3 July 1998
21:00 CEST (UTC+2)

Brazil	3–2	Denmark
Bebeto 10'; Rivaldo 25', 59'		Jørgensen 2'; B. Laudrup 50'

Stade de la Beaujoire, Nantes
Attendance: 35,500
Referee: Gamal Al-Ghandour (Egypt)

Brazil	Denmark

GK	1	Cláudio Taffarel
RB	2	Cafu	(yellow card) 81'
CB	3	Aldair	(yellow card) 37'
CB	4	Junior Baiano
LB	6	Roberto Carlos	(yellow card) 11'
CM	5	César Sampaio
CM	8	Dunga (c)
AM	10	Rivaldo		(substituted off) 87'
AM	18	Leonardo		(substituted off) 71'
CF	20	Bebeto		(substituted off) 64'
CF	9	Ronaldo
Substitutes:
FW	19	Denílson		(substituted on) 64'
MF	11	Emerson		(substituted on) 71'
MF	16	Zé Roberto		(substituted on) 87'
Manager:
Mário Zagallo

GK	1	Peter Schmeichel
RB	12	Søren Colding	(yellow card) 39'
CB	3	Marc Rieper
CB	4	Jes Høgh
LB	5	Jan Heintze
CM	6	Thomas Helveg	(yellow card) 19'	(substituted off) 87'
CM	7	Allan Nielsen		(substituted off) 46'
RW	21	Martin Jørgensen
LW	10	Michael Laudrup (c)
SS	11	Brian Laudrup
CF	18	Peter Møller		(substituted off) 66'
Substitutes:
MF	15	Stig Tøfting	(yellow card) 72'	(substituted on) 46'
FW	19	Ebbe Sand		(substituted on) 66'
DF	2	Michael Schjønberg		(substituted on) 87'
Manager:
(Sweden) Bo Johansson

Assistant referees:
Mohamed Mansri (Tunisia)
Dramane Danté (Mali)
Fourth official:
Ali Bujsaim (United Arab Emirates)

=== Netherlands vs Argentina ===
The game saw two early goals - Kluivert giving the Netherlands a lead, which was cancelled out minutes later by Lopez. There were also three early yellow cards - Stam and Numan for the Dutch, Chamot for Argentina. Tempers began to boil over during the second half: Numan received a second yellow for a challenge on Simeone, although there were Dutch protests that Simeone had made the most of it. Ortega lost his temper completely: only a minute after receiving a yellow card for a rough challenge, he headbutted Van der Sar and was sent off at once, reducing both sides to ten men. With extra time looming, Bergkamp received a long pass, controlled it superbly and scored in the last minute, to send the Dutch into the semi-finals.

4 July 1998
16:30 CEST (UTC+2)

Netherlands	2–1	Argentina
Kluivert 12'; Bergkamp 90'		López 17'

Stade Vélodrome, Marseille
Attendance: 55,000
Referee: Arturo Brizio Carter (Mexico)

Netherlands	Argentina

GK	1	Edwin van der Sar
RB	2	Michael Reiziger
CB	3	Jaap Stam	(yellow card) 10'
CB	4	Frank de Boer (c)
LB	5	Arthur Numan	(yellow card) 17' (yellow-red card) 76'
CM	6	Wim Jonk
CM	16	Edgar Davids
RW	7	Ronald de Boer		(substituted off) 64'
LW	11	Phillip Cocu
SS	8	Dennis Bergkamp
CF	9	Patrick Kluivert
Substitutes:
FW	14	Marc Overmars		(substituted on) 64'
Manager:
Guus Hiddink

GK	1	Carlos Roa
RB	22	Javier Zanetti
CB	2	Roberto Ayala
CB	6	Roberto Sensini	(yellow card) 60'
LB	3	José Chamot	(yellow card) 22'	(substituted off) 89'
DM	5	Matías Almeyda		(substituted off) 68'
CM	8	Diego Simeone (c)
CM	11	Juan Sebastián Verón
AM	10	Ariel Ortega	(yellow card) 86' (red card) 87'
SS	7	Claudio López
CF	9	Gabriel Batistuta
Substitutes:
DF	4	Mauricio Pineda		(substituted on) 68'
FW	18	Abel Balbo		(substituted on) 89'
Manager:
Daniel Passarella

Assistant referees:
Owen Powell (Jamaica)
Reynaldo Salinas (Honduras)
Fourth official:
Epifanio Gonzalez Chavez (Paraguay)

=== Germany vs Croatia ===
Germany initially had the better of the first half, forcing a couple of good saves from Ladic in the Croatian goal. However, the complexion of the match was changed when Christian Wörns was sent off in the 40th minute, for a rough tackle from behind. With Germany down to ten, Jarni scored to give Croatia the lead on the stroke of half-time: Vlaovic's shot from just outside the penalty area, and Suker's close-range shot in the 85th minute, gave Croatia a 3-0 victory.

4 July 1998
21:00 CEST (UTC+2)

Germany	0–3	Croatia
		Jarni 45+3'; Vlaović 80'; Šuker 85'

Stade de Gerland, Lyon
Attendance: 39,100
Referee: Rune Pedersen (Norway)

Germany	Croatia

GK	1	Andreas Köpke
SW	8	Lothar Matthäus
CB	2	Christian Wörns	(red card) 40'
CB	4	Jürgen Kohler
RWB	3	Jörg Heinrich	(yellow card) 18'
LWB	21	Michael Tarnat	(yellow card) 37'
DM	16	Dietmar Hamann		(substituted off) 79'
DM	13	Jens Jeremies
AM	10	Thomas Häßler		(substituted off) 69'
CF	20	Oliver Bierhoff
CF	18	Jürgen Klinsmann (c)
Substitutes:
FW	9	Ulf Kirsten		(substituted on) 69'
FW	11	Olaf Marschall		(substituted on) 79'
Manager:
Berti Vogts

GK	1	Dražen Ladić
SW	4	Igor Štimac
CB	20	Dario Šimić	(yellow card) 13'
CB	6	Slaven Bilić
RWB	13	Mario Stanić
LWB	17	Robert Jarni
DM	14	Zvonimir Soldo
CM	7	Aljoša Asanović
CM	10	Zvonimir Boban (c)
CF	19	Goran Vlaović		(substituted off) 83'
CF	9	Davor Šuker	(yellow card) 57'
Substitutes:
MF	11	Silvio Marić		(substituted on) 83'
Manager:
Miroslav Blažević

Assistant referees:
Mikael Nilsson (Sweden)
Marc Van den Broeck (Belgium)
Fourth official:
Urs Meier (Switzerland)

== Semi-finals ==
=== Brazil vs Netherlands ===
7 July 1998
21:00 CEST (UTC+2)

Brazil	1–1 (a.e.t.)	Netherlands
Ronaldo 46'		Kluivert 87'
Penalties
Ronaldo (penalty scored); Rivaldo (penalty scored); Emerson (penalty scored); Dunga (penalty scored)	4–2	(penalty scored) F. de Boer; (penalty scored) Bergkamp; (penalty missed) Cocu; (penalty missed) R. de Boer

Stade Vélodrome, Marseille
Attendance: 54,000
Referee: Ali Bujsaim (United Arab Emirates)

Brazil	Netherlands

GK	1	Cláudio Taffarel
RB	13	Zé Carlos	(yellow card) 31'
CB	3	Aldair
CB	4	Junior Baiano
LB	6	Roberto Carlos
CM	5	César Sampaio	(yellow card) 45'
CM	8	Dunga (c)
AM	10	Rivaldo
AM	18	Leonardo		(substituted off) 85'
CF	20	Bebeto		(substituted off) 70'
CF	9	Ronaldo
Substitutes:
FW	19	Denílson		(substituted on) 70'
MF	11	Emerson		(substituted on) 85'
Manager:
Mário Zagallo

GK	1	Edwin van der Sar
RB	2	Michael Reiziger	(yellow card) 48'	(substituted off) 56'
CB	3	Jaap Stam
CB	4	Frank de Boer (c)
LB	11	Phillip Cocu
CM	6	Wim Jonk		(substituted off) 111'
CM	16	Edgar Davids	(yellow card) 60'
RW	7	Ronald de Boer
LW	12	Boudewijn Zenden		(substituted off) 75'
SS	8	Dennis Bergkamp
CF	9	Patrick Kluivert
Substitutes:
MF	20	Aron Winter		(substituted on) 56'
FW	17	Pierre van Hooijdonk	(yellow card) 90'	(substituted on) 75'
MF	10	Clarence Seedorf	(yellow card) 119'	(substituted on) 111'
Manager:
Guus Hiddink

Assistant referees:
Hussain Ghadanfari (Kuwait)
Mohamed Al Musawi (Oman)
Fourth official:
Rahman Al Zaid (Saudi Arabia)

=== France vs Croatia ===
8 July 1998
21:00 CEST (UTC+2)

France	2–1	Croatia
Thuram 47', 70'		Šuker 46'

Stade de France, Saint-Denis
Attendance: 76,000
Referee: José María García-Aranda (Spain)

France	Croatia

GK	16	Fabien Barthez
RB	15	Lilian Thuram
CB	5	Laurent Blanc	(red card) 74'
CB	8	Marcel Desailly
LB	3	Bixente Lizarazu
DM	7	Didier Deschamps (c)
RM	19	Christian Karembeu		(substituted off) 31'
LM	17	Emmanuel Petit
AM	10	Zinedine Zidane
CF	6	Youri Djorkaeff		(substituted off) 77'
CF	9	Stéphane Guivarc'h		(substituted off) 68'
Substitutes:
FW	12	Thierry Henry		(substituted on) 31'
FW	20	David Trezeguet		(substituted on) 68'
DF	18	Frank Leboeuf		(substituted on) 77'
Manager:
Aimé Jacquet

GK	1	Dražen Ladić
SW	4	Igor Štimac
CB	20	Dario Šimić	(yellow card) 88'
CB	6	Slaven Bilić
RWB	13	Mario Stanić	(yellow card) 75'	(substituted off) 89'
LWB	17	Robert Jarni
DM	14	Zvonimir Soldo
CM	7	Aljoša Asanović	(yellow card) 45'
CM	10	Zvonimir Boban (c)		(substituted off) 65'
CF	19	Goran Vlaović
CF	9	Davor Šuker
Substitutes:
MF	11	Silvio Marić		(substituted on) 65'
MF	8	Robert Prosinečki		(substituted on) 89'
Manager:
Miroslav Blažević

Assistant referees:
Fernando Tresaco Gracia (Spain)
Jorge Diaz Galvez (Chile)
Fourth official:
Epifanio Gonzalez Chavez (Paraguay)

== Match for third place ==
11 July 1998
21:00 CEST (UTC+2)

Netherlands	1–2	Croatia
Zenden 22'		Prosinečki 14'; Šuker 36'

Parc des Princes, Paris
Attendance: 45,500
Referee: Epifanio González (Paraguay)

Netherlands	Croatia

GK	1	Edwin van der Sar
RB	5	Arthur Numan
CB	3	Jaap Stam
CB	4	Frank de Boer (c)
LB	11	Phillip Cocu		(substituted off) 46'
CM	6	Wim Jonk	(yellow card) 89'
CM	16	Edgar Davids	(yellow card) 89'
RW	10	Clarence Seedorf
LW	12	Boudewijn Zenden
SS	8	Dennis Bergkamp		(substituted off) 58'
CF	9	Patrick Kluivert
Substitutes:
MF	14	Marc Overmars		(substituted on) 46'
FW	17	Pierre van Hooijdonk		(substituted on) 58'
Manager:
Guus Hiddink

GK	1	Dražen Ladić
SW	14	Zvonimir Soldo
CB	6	Slaven Bilić
CB	4	Igor Štimac	(yellow card) 52'
RWB	13	Mario Stanić	(yellow card) 74'
LWB	17	Robert Jarni
DM	21	Krunoslav Jurčić	(yellow card) 34'
CM	7	Aljoša Asanović	(yellow card) 69'
CM	8	Robert Prosinečki		(substituted off) 79'
SS	10	Zvonimir Boban (c)		(substituted off) 86'
CF	9	Davor Šuker
Substitutes:
FW	19	Goran Vlaović		(substituted on) 79'
DF	15	Igor Tudor		(substituted on) 86'
Manager:
Miroslav Blažević

Assistant referees:
Emanuel Zammit (Malta)
Lencie Fred (Vanuatu)
Fourth official:
Urs Meier (Switzerland)

== Final ==
12 July 1998
21:00 CEST (UTC+2)

Brazil	0–3	France
		Zidane 27', 45+1'; Petit 90+3'

Stade de France, Saint-Denis
Attendance: 80,000
Referee: Said Belqola (Morocco)

Brazil	France

GK	1	Cláudio Taffarel
RB	2	Cafu
CB	4	Júnior Baiano	(yellow card) 33'
CB	3	Aldair
LB	6	Roberto Carlos
CM	8	Dunga (c)
CM	5	César Sampaio		(substituted off) 73'
AM	18	Leonardo		(substituted off) 46'
AM	10	Rivaldo
CF	20	Bebeto
CF	9	Ronaldo
Substitutions:
MF	19	Denílson		(substituted on) 46'
FW	21	Edmundo		(substituted on) 73'
Manager:
Mário Zagallo

GK	16	Fabien Barthez
RB	15	Lilian Thuram
CB	18	Frank Leboeuf
CB	8	Marcel Desailly	(yellow card) 48' (yellow-red card) 68'
LB	3	Bixente Lizarazu
DM	7	Didier Deschamps (c)	(yellow card) 39'
CM	19	Christian Karembeu	(yellow card) 56'	(substituted off) 57'
CM	17	Emmanuel Petit
AM	10	Zinedine Zidane
CF	6	Youri Djorkaeff		(substituted off) 74'
CF	9	Stéphane Guivarc'h		(substituted off) 66'
Substitutions:
MF	14	Alain Boghossian		(substituted on) 57'
FW	21	Christophe Dugarry		(substituted on) 66'
MF	4	Patrick Vieira		(substituted on) 74'
Manager:
Aimé Jacquet

Assistant referees:
Mark Warren (England)
Achmat Salie (South Africa)
Fourth official:
Abdul Rahman Al-Zaid (Saudi Arabia)
