= 1998 FIFA World Cup Group F =

Football tournament group stage

Group F at the 1998 FIFA World Cup comprised Germany and the Federal Republic of Yugoslavia of UEFA, Iran of the Asian Football Confederation and the United States from the CONCACAF region.

Germany and Yugoslavia both started well by beating the United States and Iran respectively. The United States was then eliminated with a match to spare after losing to Iran, while Germany drew with Yugoslavia. Iran needed to win their final game against Germany to qualify but was defeated, which meant that Yugoslavia would still have qualified even without their victory over the United States. Germany's two goals against both the United States and Iran put them top on goal difference.

== Standings ==
Pos	Team	Pld	W	D	L	GF	GA	GD	Pts	Qualification
1	Germany	3	2	1	0	6	2	+4	7	Advance to knockout stage
2	FR Yugoslavia	3	2	1	0	4	2	+2	7	Advance to knockout stage
3	Iran	3	1	0	2	2	4	−2	3	
4	United States	3	0	0	3	1	5	−4	0	

Source: FIFA
- Germany advanced to play Mexico (runner-up of Group E) in the round of 16.
- Yugoslavia advanced to play Netherlands (winner of Group E) in the round of 16.

== Matches ==
=== FR Yugoslavia vs Iran ===
14 June 1998
17:30 CEST (UTC+2)

FR Yugoslavia	1–0	Iran
Mihajlović 73'

Stade Geoffroy-Guichard, Saint-Étienne
Attendance: 30,600
Referee: Alberto Tejada (Peru)

FR Yugoslavia	Iran

GK	1	Ivica Kralj
RB	2	Zoran Mirković
CB	3	Goran Đorović
CB	11	Siniša Mihajlović
LB	16	Željko Petrović	(yellow card) 42'
CM	6	Branko Brnović		(substituted off) 50'
CM	4	Slaviša Jokanović
RM	10	Dragan Stojković (c)	(yellow card) 60'	(substituted off) 68'
LM	7	Vladimir Jugović
SS	9	Predrag Mijatović
CF	17	Savo Milošević		(substituted off) 58'
Substitutions:
MF	20	Dejan Stanković		(substituted on) 50'
FW	21	Perica Ognjenović		(substituted on) 58'
FW	22	Darko Kovačević		(substituted on) 68'
Manager:
Slobodan Santrač

GK	12	Nima Nakisa
DF	4	Mohammad Khakpour
DF	14	Nader Mohammadkhani (c)
DF	17	Javad Zarincheh
DF	20	Mehdi Pashazadeh
MF	2	Mehdi Mahdavikia
MF	6	Karim Bagheri
MF	9	Hamid Estili	(substituted off) 68'
MF	21	Mehrdad Minavand
FW	10	Ali Daei
FW	11	Khodadad Azizi
Substitutions:
MF	7	Alireza Mansourian	(substituted on) 68'
Manager:
Jalal Talebi

Assistant referees:
Owen Powell (Jamaica)
Jacek Pociegel (Poland)
Fourth official:
Rune Pedersen (Norway)

=== Germany vs United States ===
15 June 1998
21:00 CEST (UTC+2)

Germany	2–0	United States
Möller 9'; Klinsmann 65'

Parc des Princes, Paris
Attendance: 45,500
Referee: Said Belqola (Morocco)

Germany	United States

GK	1	Andreas Köpke
CB	2	Christian Wörns
CB	6	Olaf Thon
CB	4	Jürgen Kohler
RWB	19	Stefan Reuter		(substituted off) 70'
LWB	3	Jörg Heinrich	(yellow card) 84'
DM	13	Jens Jeremies	(yellow card) 30'
AM	10	Thomas Häßler		(substituted off) 50'
AM	7	Andreas Möller		(substituted off) 89'
CF	18	Jürgen Klinsmann (c)
CF	20	Oliver Bierhoff
Substitutions:
MF	16	Dietmar Hamann	(yellow card) 77'	(substituted on) 50'
DF	17	Christian Ziege		(substituted on) 70'
DF	14	Markus Babbel		(substituted on) 89'
Manager:
Berti Vogts

GK	18	Kasey Keller
CB	6	David Regis
CB	5	Thomas Dooley (c)
CB	3	Eddie Pope	(yellow card) 85'
DM	15	Chad Deering		(substituted off) 72'
DM	19	Brian Maisonneuve
RW	4	Mike Burns		(substituted off) 46'
CM	21	Claudio Reyna
LW	13	Cobi Jones
AM	8	Earnie Stewart
CF	11	Eric Wynalda		(substituted off) 65'
Substitutions:
MF	2	Frankie Hejduk	(yellow card) 50'	(substituted on) 46'
FW	7	Roy Wegerle		(substituted on) 65'
MF	10	Tab Ramos		(substituted on) 72'
Manager:
Steve Sampson

Assistant referees:
Mohamed Mansri (Tunisia)
Mikael Nilsson (Sweden)
Fourth official:
José María García-Aranda (Spain)

=== Germany vs FR Yugoslavia ===
21 June 1998
14:30 CEST (UTC+2)

Germany	2–2	FR Yugoslavia
Mihajlović 72' (o.g.); Bierhoff 78'		Mijatović 13'; Stojković 52'

Stade Félix-Bollaert, Lens
Attendance: 38,100
Referee: Kim Milton Nielsen (Denmark)

Germany	FR Yugoslavia

GK	1	Andreas Köpke
SW	6	Olaf Thon
CB	2	Christian Wörns
CB	4	Jürgen Kohler
RWB	3	Jörg Heinrich
LWB	17	Christian Ziege		(substituted off) 66'
CM	13	Jens Jeremies
CM	16	Dietmar Hamann		(substituted off) 46'
AM	7	Andreas Möller		(substituted off) 57'
CF	18	Jürgen Klinsmann (c)
CF	20	Oliver Bierhoff
Substitutions:
MF	8	Lothar Matthäus	(yellow card) 75'	(substituted on) 46'
FW	9	Ulf Kirsten		(substituted on) 57'
DF	21	Michael Tarnat		(substituted on) 66'
Manager:
Berti Vogts

GK	1	Ivica Kralj
RB	13	Slobodan Komljenović
CB	3	Goran Đorović
CB	11	Siniša Mihajlović
LB	16	Željko Petrović	(substituted off) 74'
DM	4	Slaviša Jokanović
RM	20	Dejan Stanković	(substituted off) 66'
CM	10	Dragan Stojković (c)
LM	7	Vladimir Jugović
SS	9	Predrag Mijatović
CF	22	Darko Kovačević	(substituted off) 57'
Substitutions:
FW	21	Perica Ognjenović	(substituted on) 57'
MF	18	Dejan Govedarica	(substituted on) 66'
MF	19	Miroslav Stević	(substituted on) 74'
Manager:
Slobodan Santrač

Assistant referees:
Emanuel Zammit (Malta)
Marc Van den Broeck (Belgium)
Fourth official:
Masayoshi Okada (Japan)

=== United States vs Iran ===
21 June 1998
21:00 CEST (UTC+2)

United States	1–2	Iran
McBride 87'		Estili 40'; Mahdavikia 84'

Stade de Gerland, Lyon
Attendance: 39,100
Referee: Urs Meier (Switzerland)

United States	Iran

GK	18	Kasey Keller
CB	3	Eddie Pope
CB	5	Thomas Dooley (c)		(substituted off) 82'
CB	6	David Regis	(yellow card) 18'
RWB	2	Frankie Hejduk
CM	10	Tab Ramos		(substituted off) 57'
CM	21	Claudio Reyna
CM	9	Joe-Max Moore
LWB	13	Cobi Jones
CF	7	Roy Wegerle		(substituted off) 57'
CF	20	Brian McBride
Substitutions:
MF	8	Earnie Stewart		(substituted on) 57'
MF	14	Predrag Radosavljević		(substituted on) 57'
MF	19	Brian Maisonneuve		(substituted on) 82'
Manager:
Steve Sampson

GK	1	Ahmad Reza Abedzadeh (c)
CB	4	Mohammad Khakpour
CB	14	Nader Mohammadkhani		(substituted off) 75'
CB	20	Mehdi Pashazadeh
RWB	17	Javad Zarincheh	(yellow card) 77'	(substituted off) 77'
CM	2	Mehdi Mahdavikia
CM	6	Karim Bagheri
CM	9	Hamid Estili
LWB	21	Mehrdad Minavand	(yellow card) 8'
CF	11	Khodadad Azizi		(substituted off) 74'
CF	10	Ali Daei
Substitutions:
MF	7	Alireza Mansourian		(substituted on) 74'
DF	5	Afshin Peyrovani		(substituted on) 75'
DF	3	Naeim Saadavi		(substituted on) 77'
Manager:
Jalal Talebi

Assistant referees:
Laurent Rausisi (Switzerland)
Nicolae Grigorescu (Romania)
Fourth official:
Lucien Bouchardeau (Niger)

=== Germany vs Iran ===
25 June 1998
21:00 CEST (UTC+2)

Germany	2–0	Iran
Bierhoff 50'; Klinsmann 57'

Stade de la Mosson, Montpellier
Attendance: 29,800
Referee: Epifanio González (Paraguay)

Germany	Iran

GK	1	Andreas Köpke
CB	4	Jürgen Kohler
CB	2	Christian Wörns
CB	6	Olaf Thon		(substituted off) 46'
SW	8	Lothar Matthäus
RWB	3	Jörg Heinrich
CM	5	Thomas Helmer
CM	10	Thomas Häßler	(yellow card) 45'	(substituted off) 69'
LWB	21	Michael Tarnat		(substituted off) 76'
CF	18	Jürgen Klinsmann (c)	(yellow card) 31'
CF	20	Oliver Bierhoff
Substitutions:
MF	16	Dietmar Hamann		(substituted on) 46'
FW	9	Ulf Kirsten		(substituted on) 69'
DF	17	Christian Ziege		(substituted on) 76'
Manager:
Berti Vogts

GK	1	Ahmad Reza Abedzadeh (c)
DF	4	Mohammad Khakpour
DF	14	Nader Mohammadkhani
DF	17	Javad Zarincheh		(substituted off) 70'
DF	20	Mehdi Pashazadeh
MF	2	Mehdi Mahdavikia
MF	6	Karim Bagheri
MF	9	Hamid Estili
MF	21	Mehrdad Minavand
FW	10	Ali Daei	(yellow card) 47'
FW	11	Khodadad Azizi
Substitutions:
MF	8	Sirous Dinmohammadi		(substituted on) 70'
Manager:
Jalal Talebi

Assistant referees:
Celestino Galván (Paraguay)
Jorge Díaz Gálvez (Chile)
Fourth official:
Javier Castrilli (Argentina)

=== United States vs FR Yugoslavia ===
25 June 1998
21:00 CEST (UTC+2)

United States	0–1	FR Yugoslavia
		Komljenović 4'

Stade de la Beaujoire, Nantes
Attendance: 35,500
Referee: Gamal Al-Ghandour (Egypt)

United States	FR Yugoslavia

GK	1	Brad Friedel
DF	2	Frankie Hejduk		(substituted off) 64'
DF	4	Mike Burns
DF	5	Thomas Dooley (c)		(substituted off) 81'
DF	6	David Régis
MF	8	Earnie Stewart
MF	13	Cobi Jones
MF	19	Brian Maisonneuve
MF	21	Claudio Reyna	(yellow card) 13'
FW	9	Joe-Max Moore		(substituted off) 58'
FW	20	Brian McBride
Substitutions:
MF	14	Preki		(substituted on) 58'
FW	11	Eric Wynalda		(substituted on) 64'
DF	17	Marcelo Balboa		(substituted on) 81'
Manager:
Steve Sampson

GK	1	Ivica Kralj
RB	13	Slobodan Komljenović
CB	3	Goran Đorović
CB	11	Siniša Mihajlović
LB	16	Željko Petrović
DM	4	Slaviša Jokanović
RM	20	Dejan Stanković	(yellow card) 41'	(substituted off) 54'
CM	10	Dragan Stojković (c)		(substituted off) 62'
LM	7	Vladimir Jugović
SS	9	Predrag Mijatović		(substituted off) 30'
CF	17	Savo Milošević
Substitutions:
FW	21	Perica Ognjenović	(yellow card) 61'	(substituted on) 30'
MF	6	Branko Brnović		(substituted on) 54'
MF	8	Dejan Savićević		(substituted on) 62'
Manager:
Slobodan Santrač

Assistant referees:
Achmat Salie (South Africa)
Mark Warren (England)
Fourth official:
Ian McLeod (South Africa)

== See also ==
- Germany at the FIFA World Cup
- Iran at the FIFA World Cup
- Serbia and Montenegro at the FIFA World Cup
- United States at the FIFA World Cup
