= 1998 FIFA World Cup final =

Association football match in France

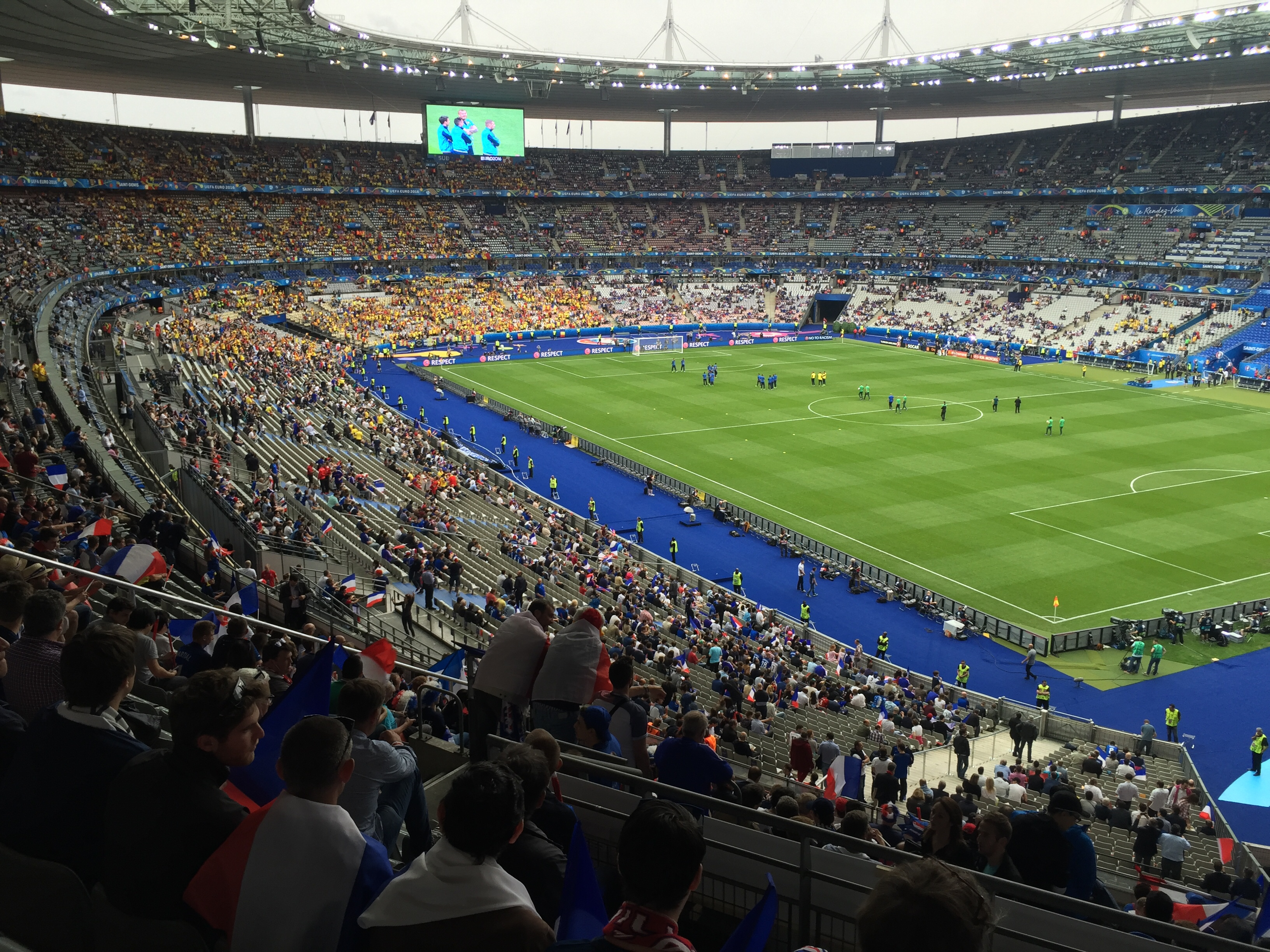
- The Stade de France (pictured in 2016) held the final
- Event: 1998 FIFA World Cup
Brazil	France
0	3
- Date: 12 July 1998
- Venue: Stade de France, Saint-Denis
- Referee: Said Belqola (Morocco)
- Attendance: 80,000
- Weather: Fair; 23 °C (73 °F), 50% humidity

The final match of the 1998 FIFA World Cup, the 16th edition of the quadrennial football competition organised by FIFA for the men's national teams of its member associations, was played at the Stade de France in Saint-Denis, France, just outside Paris, on 12 July 1998, and was contested by defending champions Brazil and hosts France.

The tournament featured France as the hosts, Brazil as the winners of the previous World Cup and 30 other teams who emerged from the qualification tournaments organised by the six FIFA confederations. The 32 teams competed in a group stage, from which 16 teams qualified for the knockout stage. En route to the final, Brazil finished first in Group A, with two wins and one defeat, after which they beat Chile in the round of 16, Denmark in the quarter-finals and the Netherlands in a penalty shoot-out in the semi-finals. France finished top of Group C with three wins, before defeating Paraguay in the round of 16, Italy in the quarter-final, and Croatia in the semi-final. The final took place in front of 80,000 supporters, with an estimated 1.3 billion watching on television, and was refereed by Said Belqola from Morocco.

Before the match, speculation surrounded the fitness of striker Ronaldo, who was initially left out of Brazil's starting line-up, only to be restored to the team before kick-off. France took the lead shortly before the half-hour mark, when Zinedine Zidane outjumped Leonardo to connect with a header from an in-swinging corner from the right taken by Emmanuel Petit. Zidane scored again, with another header from a corner, shortly before half-time to give France a 2–0 lead. Petit then added a third goal in second-half injury time, striking the ball low into the net following a pass by Patrick Vieira, to complete a 3–0 win for France.

France's win was their first World Cup title, as they became the seventh different nation to win the tournament. Ronaldo was awarded the Golden Ball as FIFA's outstanding player of the tournament. Following the win, hundreds of thousands of French supporters celebrated in Paris throughout the night, before assembling along the Champs-Élysées the following day for an open-top bus tour by the French players. France followed up their victory by winning their next major tournament at UEFA Euro 2000. Ronaldo's fitness for the match and his initial omission and later reinstatement on Brazil's teamsheet became a subject of ongoing journalistic interest following the match, with analysis continuing more than 20 years later.

== Background ==
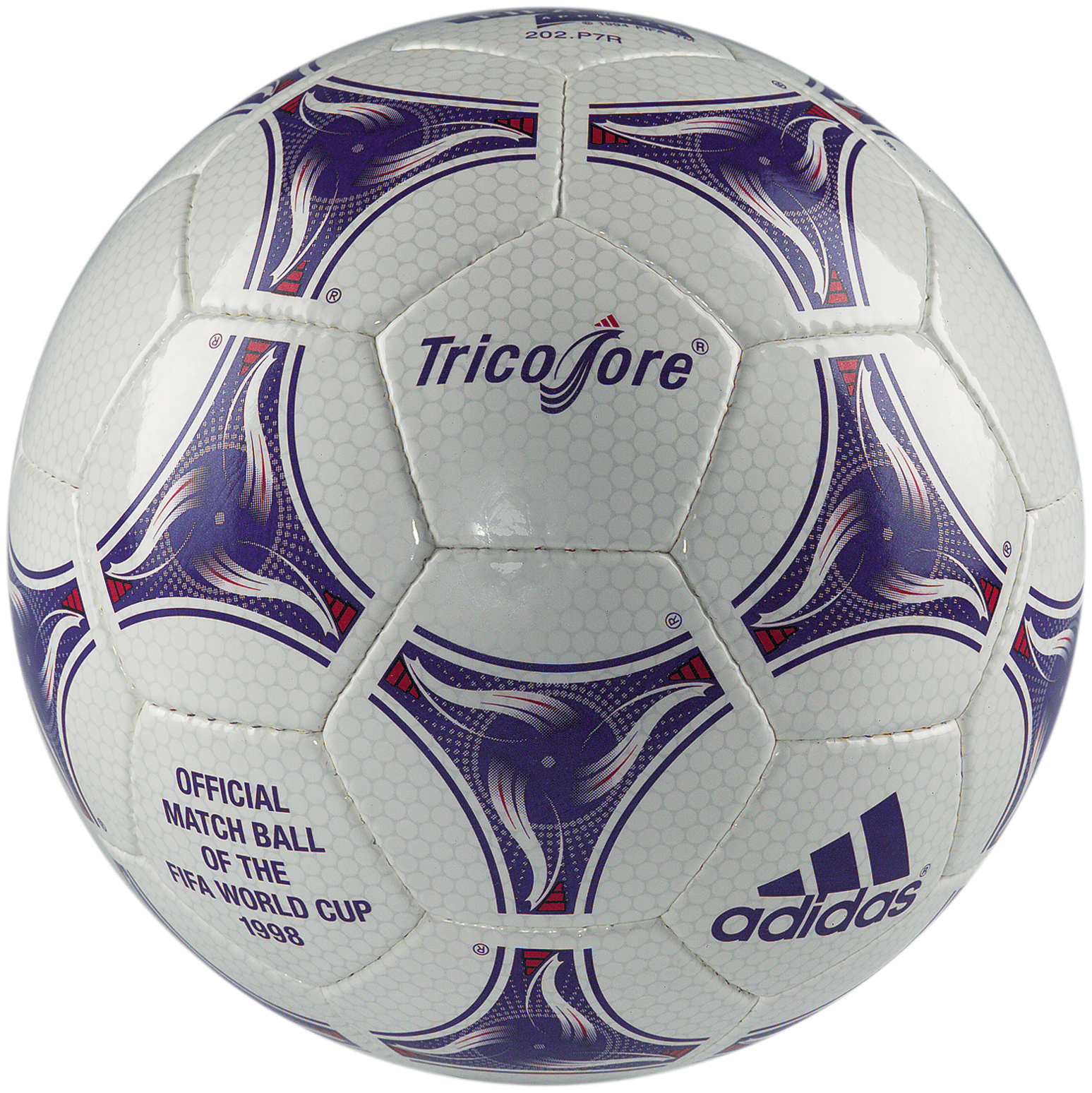
An example of the Adidas Tricolore ball used in the match

The 1998 FIFA World Cup was the 16th edition of the World Cup, FIFA's football competition for men's national teams, held in France between 10 June and 12 July 1998. The finals featured 32 teams for the first time, up from 24 in the 1994 World Cup. Both France and Brazil qualified automatically for the tournament – France as hosts and Brazil because they had won the tournament in 1994. The remaining 30 spots were decided through qualifying rounds held between March 1996 and November 1997, organised by the six FIFA confederations and involving 168 teams. In the finals, the teams were divided into eight groups of four with each team playing each other once in a round-robin format. The two top teams from each group advanced to a knock-out stage. The game was played at the Stade de France, in the northern Paris suburb of Saint-Denis, an 80,000-capacity stadium which was purpose-built for the 1998 FIFA World Cup because there were no previously existing venues large enough to accommodate the final.

Brazil had won the previous World Cup in the United States in 1994, defeating Italy in a penalty shoot-out in the final after the match had finished 0–0 after extra time, the first ever goalless final. They began the 1998 tournament as favourites with Mário Zagallo, their manager, having been involved with all four previous Brazilian wins – as a player in 1958 and 1962, as manager in 1970 and assistant manager in 1994. France did not qualify for the 1994 tournament because they were eliminated in their qualifying group, finishing behind Sweden and Bulgaria. However, they had followed this up with a run to the semi-finals at UEFA Euro 1996, in which they were beaten in a penalty shoot-out by the Czech Republic. France's midfielder Zinedine Zidane had been tied for third place in the 1997 FIFA World Player of the Year contest and was labelled by former Brazilian forward Pelé as "one of the players to watch" at the 1998 World Cup. Before the tournament, Aimé Jacquet, the manager of France, told reporters that his team were "here to win the World Cup, nothing less". The two teams had met twice previously in the World Cup – in the semi-final of the 1958 tournament, which Brazil won 5–2, and the quarter-final in 1986 when France won in a penalty shoot-out after the game finished 1–1 after extra time. Their most recent meeting had been in the opening match of the 1997 Tournoi de France, which finished 1–1. Roberto Carlos had scored Brazil's goal in that game with a famous Banana Shot free kick, curling from a 33.13-metre distance and often considered to be one of the best in the modern game.

The match ball used at the tournament was the Adidas Tricolore, which was specifically made for the World Cup. The tricolour flag and Gallic rooster, traditional symbols of France were used as inspiration for the design. More than 20 drafts had been proposed by the Adidas design team before the definitive version was approved.

== Route to the final ==
=== Brazil ===
Brazil's route to the final
	Opponent	Result
1	Scotland	2–1
2	Morocco	3–0
3	Norway	1–2
R16	Chile	4–1
QF	Denmark	3–2
SF	Netherlands	1–1 (a.e.t.) (4–2 p)

Brazil were in Group A at the World Cup, in which they were joined by Morocco, Norway and Scotland. Their first game was the tournament opener at the Stade de France, on 10 June against Scotland. Brazil took the lead after four minutes when César Sampaio received the ball in the penalty area from a corner taken by Bebeto, and headed the ball past Jim Leighton in the Scotland goal. Scotland equalised through a penalty scored by John Collins, after Kevin Gallacher had been fouled in the penalty area. Brazil took the lead again in the second half when a volley by Cafu was saved by Leighton but rebounded off Scotland's Tom Boyd for an own goal. Scotland appealed for a second penalty in the final minute, claiming that Dunga had handled the ball, but it was not given and Brazil won 2–1. Their second game was against Morocco, on 16 June at the Stade de la Beaujoire in Nantes. Ronaldo gave Brazil the lead with his first World Cup goal nine minutes into the game, with Rivaldo and Bebeto also scoring to give Brazil a 3–0 win. Brazil were already confirmed as winners of the group before their third game, against Norway, but Zagallo nonetheless picked most of his first-choice team, leaving out only Aldair, who had received a yellow card against Scotland and risked suspension should he receive another, and Sampaio, who was already suspended. Brazil took the lead through Bebeto on 77 minutes. Norway responded with two goals in the last ten minutes – Tore André Flo scoring the equaliser and then winning a penalty when he was fouled by Gonçalves. Kjetil Rekdal scored from the penalty spot to give Norway a 2–1 win.

Brazil's opponents in the round of 16 were Chile; the match was played on 27 June at the Parc des Princes in Paris. Brazil took the lead on 11 minutes when a Dunga free kick was met by Sampaio, who was unmarked and headed the ball past goalkeeper Nelson Tapia. Sampaio doubled Brazil's lead on 27 minutes when he shot into the corner of the net following a long-range Roberto Carlos free kick. Ronaldo added a third from a penalty in first-half injury time, after he had been fouled by Tapia. Marcelo Salas pulled a goal back for Chile in the second half, but Ronaldo then scored again to seal a 4–1 Brazilian win. In the quarter-finals they played Denmark at the Stade de la Beaujoire on 3 July. Denmark scored the first goal two minutes into the game through Martin Jørgensen, with Bebeto equalising eight minutes later. Brazil then took the lead with a goal by Rivaldo on 27 minutes, completing a move involving Dunga and Ronaldo. Brian Laudrup levelled the scores five minutes into the second half, but Rivaldo scored again 30 minutes before the end to seal a 3–2 win for Brazil. Brazil's semi-final was against the Netherlands at the Stade Vélodrome in Marseille. Ronaldo gave Brazil the lead shortly after half-time, but Patrick Kluivert equalised for the Netherlands three minutes before the end. The game went to extra time, with the golden goal rule in effect. (Note: The golden goal rule stipulates that 30 minutes of extra time is to be played, but that the game would end immediately should either team score in that period, with the scoring team being declared the winners.) There was no further scoring, however, and the game was settled by a penalty shoot-out. The two sides took their kicks alternately with Brazil kicking first and the first five penalties were all scored, giving Brazil a 3–2 lead. Brazilian goalkeeper Cláudio Taffarel then saved penalties from Phillip Cocu and Ronald de Boer with Dunga scoring again for Brazil, which meant Brazil won the shoot-out 4–2 and progressed to the final.

=== France ===
France's route to the final
	Opponent	Result
1	South Africa	3–0
2	Saudi Arabia	4–0
3	Denmark	2–1
R16	Paraguay	1–0 (a.e.t.)
QF	Italy	0–0 (a.e.t.) (4–3 p)
SF	Croatia	2–1

France were drawn in Group C at the finals, alongside Denmark, Saudi Arabia and South Africa. They began their campaign on 12 June against World Cup debutants South Africa at the Stade Vélodrome. In a match which Richard Williams of The Guardian said they "dominated throughout", France won 3–0 with a goal in the first half from Christophe Dugarry, a 77th minute own goal by South Africa's Pierre Issa and a last-minute strike by Thierry Henry. Their second game was against Saudi Arabia at the Stade de France on 18 June. Henry gave France the lead in the first half, scoring from a cross by Bixente Lizarazu, before France scored three goals in the final fifteen minutes through David Trezeguet, Henry again and Lizarazu to complete a 4–0 win. Both sides had a player sent off – Mohammed Al-Khilaiwi in the 18th minute for Saudi Arabia and Zidane for France on 70 minutes for a stamp on Fuad Anwar. Zidane was suspended for the next two games. With progression to the knockout stage assured, Jacquet made eight changes to his team for the final game against Denmark at the Stade Gerland in Lyon on 24 June. France took the lead on 13 minutes when Youri Djorkaeff converted a penalty after Jes Høgh fouled Trezeguet. Denmark then won a penalty shortly before half-time for a Vincent Candela foul on Jørgensen which was scored by Michael Laudrup. In the second half, Emmanuel Petit scored with a low shot into the corner of the Danish goal to seal a 2–1 victory and first place in the group. France's round-of-16 opponents were Paraguay, at the Stade Félix-Bollaert in Lens on 28 June. In a match labelled a "real stinker" by Williams, with France described as "extraordinarily inept", there were no goals during the 90 minutes of normal time and the first period of extra time. With six minutes remaining, France broke the deadlock, Laurent Blanc scoring the FIFA World Cup's first ever golden goal to seal a 1–0 win and a place in the quarter-finals. There, they met Italy, the losing finalists from 1994, at Stade de France on 3 July. There were no goals during normal time and no golden goal, so the game was decided by a penalty shoot-out. With France taking the first penalty, both sides scored their openers, before goalkeepers Gianluca Pagliuca and Fabien Barthez saved a penalty each, from Lizarazu and Demetrio Albertini respectively. The next five were all scored to leave France 4–3 ahead with one Italian penalty remaining. Luigi Di Biagio struck the crossbar with his kick and France advanced to the semi-finals with a 4–3 shoot-out win. They returned to the Stade de France on 8 July for a semi-final against Croatia. After a goalless first half, there were two goals in quick succession shortly after half-time as Davor Šuker gave Croatia the lead before Lilian Thuram equalised for France. Thuram then gave France the lead on 70 minutes with his second and last goal for France. Despite Blanc being sent off five minutes later for violent conduct towards Slaven Bilić, France held on for a 2–1 win and a place in the final. Blanc's red card was the only one he received in his entire career, and meant that he was suspended for the final. Bilić's reaction implied that Blanc had struck him on the head in the incident, but video replays showed that the impact had been to his chest or chin, and the incident is often cited as one of the most controversial in the competition's history.

== Pre-match ==
Brazil was considered the favourites by bookmakers before the match, with odds of 4–6 for them to win the tournament, compared with 6–5 for France.

Match officials

Said Belqola of Morocco was selected to referee the final. An amateur referee who worked as a customs officer professionally, he had begun officiating in 1983 before being selected to referee international matches in 1993. Prior to the 1998 World Cup he had refereed two matches each at the 1996 and 1998 African Cup of Nations, including the final of the latter tournament, between South Africa and Egypt. At the 1998 World Cup he had refereed the Argentina vs Croatia and Germany vs United States group games. The assistant referees were Mark Warren of England and Achmat Salie of South Africa, while Saudi Arabia's Abdul Rahman Al-Zaid was the fourth official.

=== Team selection ===
In what was later described by writers for BBC Sport as the "great World Cup final mystery", Ronaldo was omitted from the official teamsheet which Zagallo presented to FIFA at 7:48 p.m. local time (5:48 p.m. UTC), 72 minutes before kick off, with Edmundo named in his place. Reporters for the BBC and other media received the news shortly after 8 p.m. and had not expected this development, with John Motson describing scenes of "absolute mayhem and chaos" in the commentary box. At 8:18 p.m., however, Brazil submitted a modified teamsheet with Ronaldo's name reinstated. It was disclosed several years later that Ronaldo had suffered a convulsive fit on the afternoon of the final, had lost consciousness and spent three hours in hospital. Following preliminary tests that yielded no abnormalities, he was discharged and decided shortly before kickoff that he still intended to play. Concerned by the condition of their teammate, who nonetheless insisted on playing, the Brazilian squad missed their scheduled pre-match warmup.

With the exception of Cafu, who had been suspended for Brazil's semi-final match and returned in place of Zé Carlos, Brazil therefore named an unchanged side with Edmundo on the substitutes' bench. Blanc was suspended following his semi-final red card and his place in the French team was taken by Frank Leboeuf. Otherwise, France named an unchanged team.

== Match ==
=== First half ===
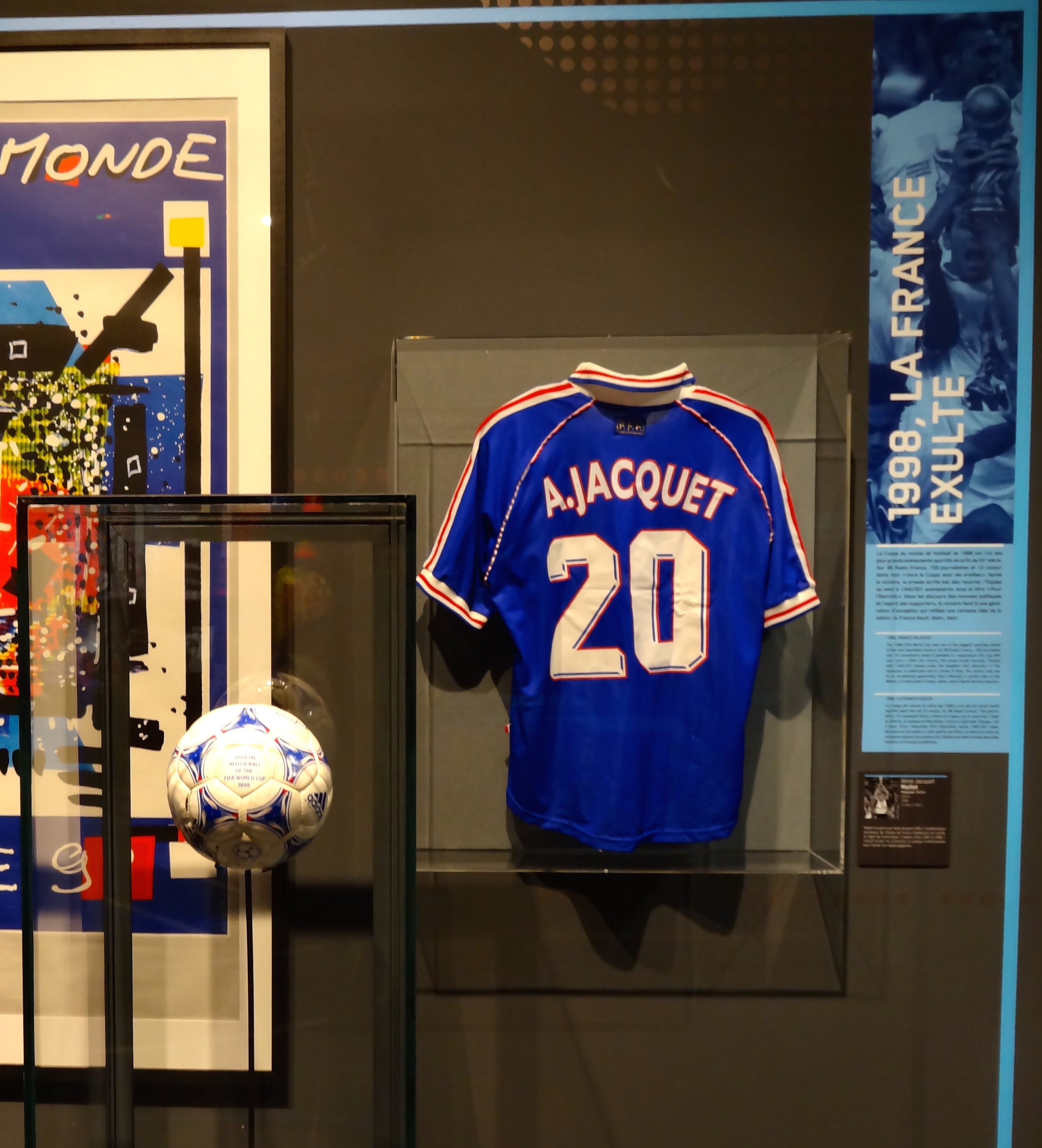
An exhibit on the final at the Musée National du Sport at the Allianz Riviera in Nice, containing a jersey with Jacquet's name and the match ball.

France kicked off the match at 9 p.m. local time, in front of an attendance of 80,000 and an estimated global television audience of 1.7 billion. The weather at Charles de Gaulle Airport, 17 kilometres (11 mi) from the stadium, (Note: Distance measured using Google Maps distance calculator, between Paris Charles de Gaulle Airport, coordinates 49.0096774°N, 2.5457773°E and Stade de France, coordinates 48.9238848°N, 2.3580294°E.) was recorded as fair at the time of kick-off, with a temperature of 23 °C (73 °F) and 50% humidity. France had a chance to score in the opening minute, when the ball was passed upfield towards Stéphane Guivarc'h, who attempted a bicycle kick which went over the cross bar and landed on the top of the Brazilian net. Guivarc'h had another opportunity three minutes later, when he received a pass from Zidane on the edge of the penalty area and was one-on-one with Taffarel, but his shot under pressure from Júnior Baiano was stopped by the goalkeeper. On 5 minutes, Rivaldo hit a long cross to the far corner of the penalty area towards Leonardo, who could not reach it; the ball went out for a goal kick. France won a free kick a minute later when Cafu fouled Lizarazu, which Zidane curled into the penalty area. It reached Djorkaeff, who was unmarked; he attempted to score with a header, but it went high and wide of the goal. On 17 minutes, Djorkaeff hit a long-range shot from the right-hand side, but it went wide of the Brazilian goal. Five minutes later, Ronaldo received the ball near the touch-line and started running towards goal; from the left-hand edge of the penalty area he passed it to his right. Barthez almost tipped the ball into his own goal but was able to catch it before it crossed the line. Brazil won a corner on 23 minutes, which was taken by Leonardo into the penalty area. Sampaio directed a powerful header towards the goal, but it was aimed straight at Barthez who saved it.

Zidane gave France the lead just before the half-hour mark, outjumping Leonardo to connect with a header from an in-swinging corner from the right taken by Petit. Four minutes later, Ronaldo received the ball following a long pass from Dunga, but Barthez punched his shot clear. Ronaldo and Barthez collided with each other during the incident; both needed assistance from medics but were able to continue the game. Baiano received the first yellow card of the match on 33 minutes for a foul on Djorkaeff. French captain Didier Deschamps was then shown a yellow card four minutes later for a diving challenge on Rivaldo. On 41 minutes, Petit had a chance to score from 12 yards (11 m) when a pass forward by Christian Karembeu rebounded to him in space after hitting the back of Baiano's feet. Baiano recovered, however, to deflect the Frenchman's shot wide of the goalpost. Shortly before first-half injury time, Thuram sent the ball upfield from deep within his own half, which was missed by the Brazilian defenders and reached Guivarc'h, one-on-one with Taffarel. The goalkeeper blocked his shot behind for a corner, however. France won another corner a minute later, which was taken on the left by Djorkaeff into the penalty area, where Zidane once again headed the ball into the goal, through the legs of Roberto Carlos, to give France a 2–0 half-time lead.

=== Second half ===
The second half began with a Brazil substitution as Denílson replaced Leonardo. Marcel Desailly received a yellow card in the 49th minute for dissent, after the referee had penalised him for a foul on Cafu. On 51 minutes, Bebeto took a corner from the right-hand side which reached Denílson, who fell down as his attempted shot went wide of the goal while Deschamps was also challenging for the ball. Brazil's players appealed for a penalty, but Belqola did not award it. A minute later, Dunga had a shot from outside the penalty area which went wide of Barthez's goal. Karembeu was shown a yellow card on 55 minutes for a foul from behind on Cafu. Rivaldo took the resulting free-kick short towards Roberto Carlos, who ran to the left edge of the penalty area before crossing it in, where it reached Ronaldo. He shot from close range but Barthez saved. On 57 minutes, France made a change when Alain Boghossian came on in place of Karembeu. Three minutes later, Roberto Carlos took a long throw-in from the left-hand side, which Barthez failed to catch near the edge of his penalty area, allowing Bebeto to take a shot, but Desailly blocked it.

On 63 minutes, Guivarc'h was one-on-one with Taffarel following what FIFA commentators described as a "mistake" by the Brazilian defence, but he fired his shot wide of the goal. Three minutes later Guivarc'h was taken off, as Jacquet brought on Dugarry in his place. On 68 minutes, Desailly made a sliding tackle on Cafu which was given as a foul by the referee. Belqola showed him a second yellow card, which reduced France to 10 men for the last 20 minutes. Desailly was just the third player to be sent off in a World Cup final after Argentina's Pedro Monzón and Gustavo Dezotti, both in 1990 in Rome against West Germany.

After 74 minutes, Edmundo was brought on by Zagallo, replacing César Sampaio. A minute later, France made a defensive substitution, bringing on Patrick Vieira in place of Djorkaeff. On 82 minutes, Dugarry was through on goal with only Taffarel to beat, but his shot went wide of the goal. Brazil had a chance to score in second-half injury time when Denílson's shot hit the crossbar. Two minutes later, France created a final chance on the counterattack when Dugarry cleared Denílson's corner kick and found Vieira open on the left. Vieira then put his Arsenal teammate Petit through on goal with a first-touch through ball, and Petit finished low to Taffarel's left. Petit's goal was the 1000th in France national team history and was the final kick of the game, sealing a 3–0 victory.

=== Details ===
12 July 1998
21:00 CEST (UTC+2)

Brazil	0–3	France
		Zidane 27', 45+1'; Petit 90+3'

Stade de France, Saint-Denis
Attendance: 80,000
Referee: Said Belqola (Morocco)

Brazil	France

GK	1	Cláudio Taffarel
RB	2	Cafu
CB	4	Júnior Baiano	(yellow card) 33'
CB	3	Aldair
LB	6	Roberto Carlos
CM	8	Dunga (c)
CM	5	César Sampaio		(substituted off) 73'
AM	18	Leonardo		(substituted off) 46'
AM	10	Rivaldo
CF	20	Bebeto
CF	9	Ronaldo
Substitutions:
MF	19	Denílson		(substituted on) 46'
FW	21	Edmundo		(substituted on) 73'
Manager:
Mário Zagallo

GK	16	Fabien Barthez
RB	15	Lilian Thuram
CB	18	Frank Leboeuf
CB	8	Marcel Desailly	(yellow card) 48' (yellow-red card) 68'
LB	3	Bixente Lizarazu
DM	7	Didier Deschamps (c)	(yellow card) 39'
CM	19	Christian Karembeu	(yellow card) 56'	(substituted off) 57'
CM	17	Emmanuel Petit
AM	10	Zinedine Zidane
CF	6	Youri Djorkaeff		(substituted off) 74'
CF	9	Stéphane Guivarc'h		(substituted off) 66'
Substitutions:
MF	14	Alain Boghossian		(substituted on) 57'
FW	21	Christophe Dugarry		(substituted on) 66'
MF	4	Patrick Vieira		(substituted on) 74'
Manager:
Aimé Jacquet

Assistant referees:
Mark Warren (England)
Achmat Salie (South Africa)
Fourth official:
Abdul Rahman Al-Zaid (Saudi Arabia)

Match rules

- 90 minutes
- 30 minutes of extra time if necessary
- Penalty shoot-out if scores still level
- Maximum of three substitutions

=== Statistics ===
	Brazil	France
Goals scored	0	3
Total shots	12	14
Shots on target	6	5
Fouls committed	15	13
Offsides	5	3
Yellow cards	1	4
Red cards	0	1

== Post-match ==
=== France ===
Après avoir vu ça, on peut mourir tranquille. Enfin, le plus tard possible, mais on peut. Ah c'est superbe. Quel pied, ah quel pied! Oh putain!
After seeing this, one can die in peace. Though, hopefully, not too soon...This is great, fuck, this is the bollocks!

— Thierry Roland on TF1's broadcast of the final after full time (translation by The Guardian)

France's win was their first World Cup title, becoming the seventh out of – as of 2026 – eight different countries to win the tournament. They also became the sixth team to win the competition as hosts and the first since Argentina in 1978.

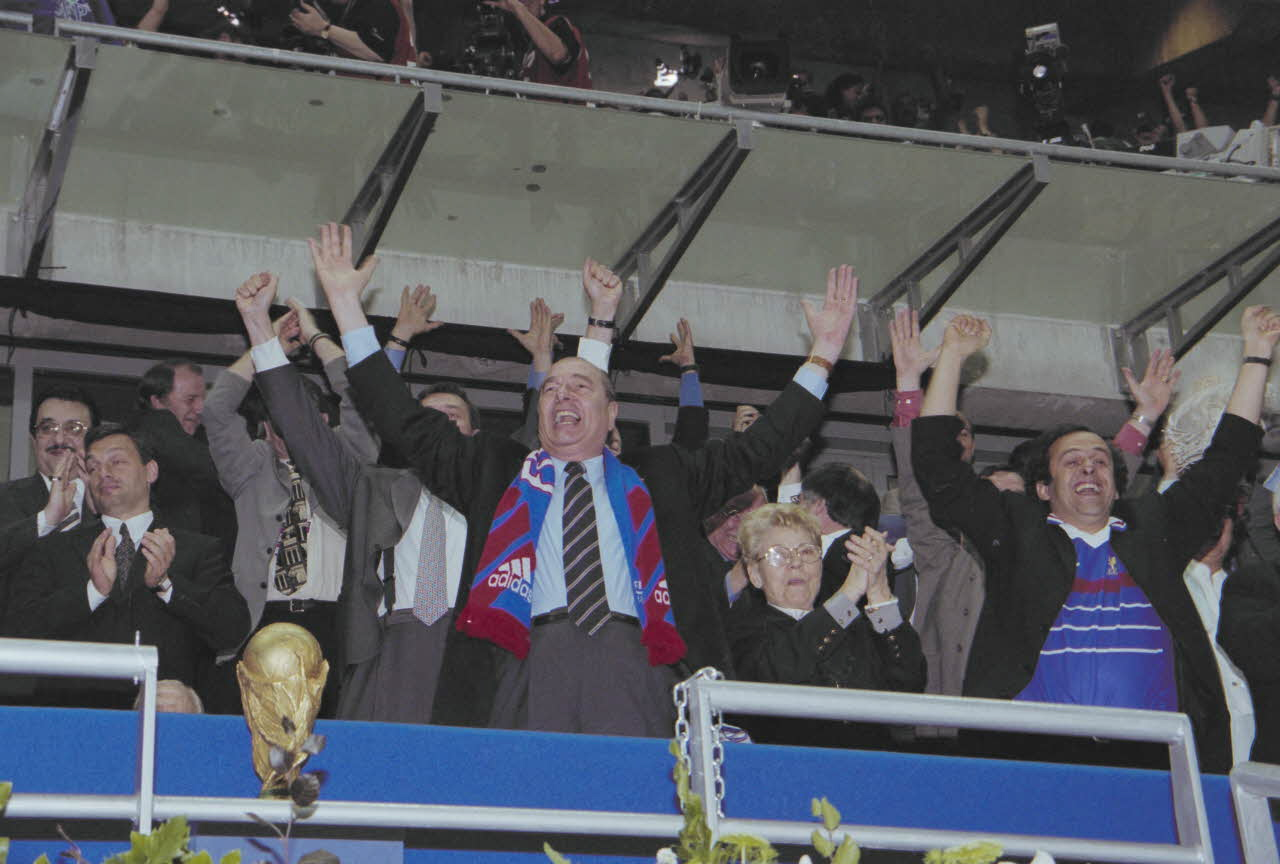
French president Jacques Chirac, the International Olympic Committee president Juan Antonio Samaranch, the newly elected FIFA president Sepp Blatter and his outgoing predecessor João Havelange, UEFA president Lennart Johansson, and co-president of local organizing committee Michel Platini were among those present at the stands during the awards ceremony. President Chirac handed the trophy to French captain Deschamps.

Millions of French supporters celebrated their team's victory in Paris throughout the night, with an estimated 1.5 million on the Champs-Élysées alone as players' names and faces along with celebratory messages were projected onto the Arc de Triomphe. It was reported that such scenes had not been seen there since Paris' liberation from Nazi German occupation in late August 1944 during World War II, including Charles de Gaulle's parade down the same avenue on 26 August.

The next day, the Champs-Elysées was also packed with fans as the French players made an open-top bus tour down the avenue. The celebrations continued through to Tuesday, France's national Bastille Day holiday, with Chirac inviting the team to a garden party at the Élysée Palace following the Bastille Day military parade and praising the nation's solidarity during a speech there. The day after the final, L'Équipe led its front page with the banner headline Pour L'Éternité (For Eternity), with that 13 July edition becoming and remaining the most-sold edition in the newspaper's history with over 1.6 million copies sold. On 24 July, each player was made a Chevalier (Knight) in France's Legion of Honour.

An effet Mondial (World Cup effect) of France's victory on the country was cited, most notably economically. A political cartoon by Plantu published in L'Express after the final illustrated the issues that a multicultural French team winning the World Cup had posed to the French far-right, reading: Pendant que l'équipe de France black-blanc-beur chante la Marseillaise et que le peuple français acclame Thuram, Zidane et Karembeu, un collaborateur console (Jean-Marie) Le Pen en disant: "Ne pleure pas, Jean-Marie! Si ça se trouve, la finale du prochain Mondial, ce sera peut-être Nigeria-Cameroun," sur quoi Le Pen, tombe de sa chaise à la renverse. (As the black, white and Arabic French team sings La Marseillaise and as the French people acclaim Thuram, Zidane and Karambeu, a collaborator consoles Le Pen by saying, "Don't cry, Jean-Marie! It could be that the final of the next World Cup may be Nigeria vs. Cameroon," at which Le Pen falls out of his chair backwards.)

The French players had made "I Will Survive" by Gloria Gaynor their unofficial anthem, particularly focusing on the instrumental sub-theme to sing "la la la la la" inspired by a remix of the song by Hermes House Band. Following France's victory, the song enjoyed immense popular enthusiasm amongst younger generations in the country 20 years after its original release in 1978. Gaynor also later released a version with the "la la la la la" chant included, called "I Will Survive '98".

In 2018, France 2 aired a documentary in honor of the 20th anniversary of the final titled 12 juillet 1998, le jour parfait (12 July 1998, The Perfect Day) with Jean-Pierre Devillers as director and Valérie Amarou as writer. Among the celebrities and fans who shared their experiences in the documentary were athletes who cited the victory as a catalyst, such as footballer Laura Georges, épeé fencer Laura Flessel-Colovic, and judoka Teddy Riner.

=== Brazil ===
It was only the second time Brazil had lost a World Cup final, with the first being their 2–1 upset loss to Uruguay at the Maracanã Stadium in Rio de Janeiro in the final match of 1950 known as the Maracanaço (similarly, this marked Brazil's first World Cup final loss in a knockout format). The 3–0 scoreline was also Brazil's largest loss in the World Cup until their 7–1 defeat to Germany as hosts in the 2014 semi-final at the Mineirão in Belo Horizonte, subsequently dubbed the Mineiraço.

Ronaldo's fitness for the match and his initial omission and later reinstatement on Brazil's teamsheet became a subject of ongoing journalistic interest following the match, with analysis continuing more than 20 years later. A number of conspiracy theories regarding the incident emerged, including an allegation by striker Edmundo (who had been set to play in Ronaldo's place) that Brazil's team sponsor Nike had pressured Zagallo to reinstate the player. Zagallo also said that the decision was his and the player's, saying "if there had been interference, I would have resigned". A government inquiry into Nike's involvement with Brazil was launched by politician Aldo Rebelo and interviewed numerous players, officials and team doctors, but it cleared Nike of any wrongdoing. Another theory, promulgated in Brazilian newspaper Folha de S.Paulo, was that Ronaldo had a nervous breakdown during the tournament, and some players also said that team doctor Lidio Toledo had cried about Ronaldo's condition when he encountered him in the dressing room. Toledo did not sign him off as unfit however, later saying "imagine if I stopped him playing and Brazil lost, at that moment I'd have to go and live on the North Pole."

=== Subsequent tournaments ===
France followed up their victory by qualifying for and winning UEFA Euro 2000 held in the Netherlands and Belgium. This made them just the second country to be world and European champions simultaneously after West Germany won Euro 1972 and then the 1974 World Cup as hosts. Spain has since duplicated the feat twice after winning Euro 2008, the 2010 World Cup and Euro 2012, and Euro 2024 and the 2026 World Cup.

Brazil took the Copa América title in 1999 and then won the next World Cup in Japan and South Korea in 2002 for their record fifth World Cup win as Ronaldo scored both goals in the final against Germany in Yokohama. France were eliminated in the group stage at the 2002 tournament, becoming the first World Cup holders to be eliminated without reaching the knockout stage since Brazil in 1966.

The two countries' next World Cup meeting was in a quarter-final in Stuttgart of the subsequent tournament in 2006, where a goal from Henry off a Zidane free kick was the match's only goal. France went on to return to the final, where they lost to Italy on penalties. They were eliminated at the group stage again in 2010 before winning their second World Cup in 2018 with Deschamps as coach.

== See also ==
- Brazil at the FIFA World Cup
- France at the FIFA World Cup
