= Stade de la Mosson =

Football stadium in Montpellier, France

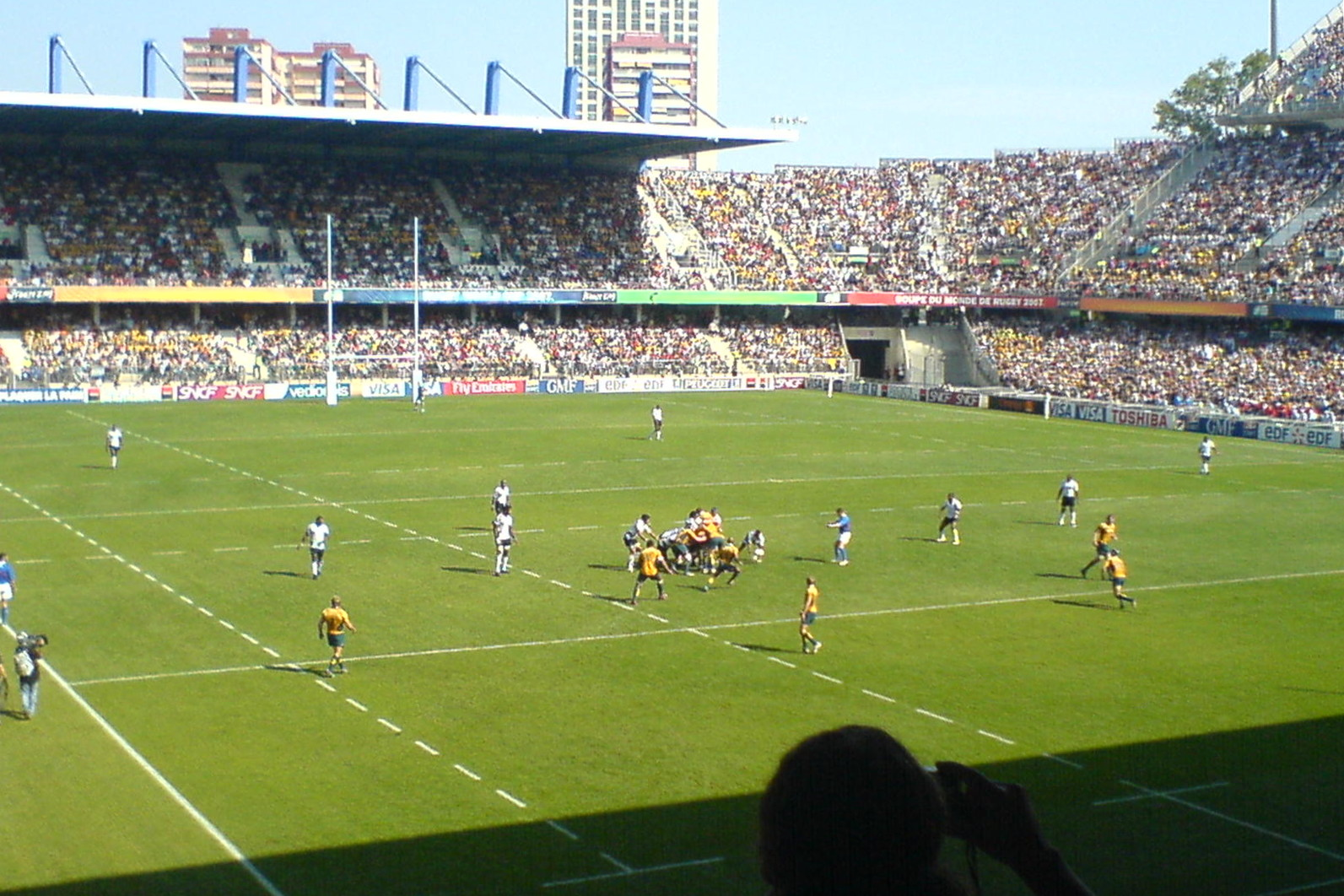
- Interactive map of Stade de la Mosson
- Full name: Stade de la Mosson
- Location: Montpellier, France
- Coordinates: 43°37′20″N 3°48′43″E
- Capacity: 20,484 (full capacity 33,556 not used due to safety reasons)
- Surface: AirFibr (hybrid grass)

Construction
- Built: 1972
- Opened: 13 January 1972
- Renovated: 1997

Tenant
- Montpellier HSC (1972–present)

The Stade de la Mosson (French pronunciation: [stad də la mɔˈsɔ̃]) is a football stadium in Montpellier, France. It is the home of Ligue 2 club Montpellier HSC, and has a capacity of 32,900. Formerly a 16,000-seater stadium, it was entirely rebuilt in 1998 to host 6 games of the 1998 FIFA World Cup. It was also used as a venue for group stage matches in the 2007 Rugby World Cup, and was one of nine venues used in the 2019 FIFA Women's World Cup.

The stadium takes its name from the neighbouring Mosson river.

== Football ==
In October 2014, the stadium flooded twice as over 30 centimeters (12 inches) of rain fell in Montpellier. The stadium and pitch were damaged, and this resulted in Montpellier HSC relocating for 5 fixtures during the 2014–15 season (4 Ligue 1 matches and 1 Coupe de la Ligue match) to the Altrad Stadium, until repairs had been made to the stadium. The relocation lasted for the remainder of 2014, the first fixture on 28 October, and the last being 13 December. The flooding caused Montpellier to cancel their 40-year anniversary celebration.

=== 1998 FIFA World Cup ===
The stadium was one of the venues for the 1998 FIFA World Cup. The following games were played at the stadium during the 1998 World Cup:

Date	Time (CEST)	Team #1	Result	Team #2	Round	Spectators
10 June 1998	21:00	Morocco	2–2	Norway	Group A	29,800
12 June 1998	14:30	Paraguay	0–0	Bulgaria	Group D	27,650
17 June 1998	21:00	Italy	3–0	Cameroon	Group B	29,800
22 June 1998	17:30	Colombia	1–0	Tunisia	Group G	29,800
25 June 1998	21:00	Germany	2–0	Iran	Group F	29,800
29 June 1998	16:30	Germany	2–1	Mexico	Round of 16	29,800

=== 2019 FIFA Women's World Cup ===
The stadium was one of the venues for the 2019 FIFA Women's World Cup. It hosted four group games and one Round of 16 match; among them were the Australia vs Brazil game – a match that was notable for witnessing the first goals conceded by Brazil in the group stage in 16 years as well as Brazil's first group stage loss for 24 years.

Date	Time (CEST)	Team #1	Res.	Team #2	Round	Attendance
10 June 2019	21:00	Canada	1–0	Cameroon	Group E	10,710
13 June 2019	18:00	Australia	3–2	Brazil	Group C	17,032
17 June 2019	18:00	South Africa	0–4	Germany	Group B	15,502
20 June 2019	18:00	Cameroon	2–1	New Zealand	Group E	8,009
25 June 2019	18:00	Italy	2–0	China	Round of 16	17,492

== Rugby union ==
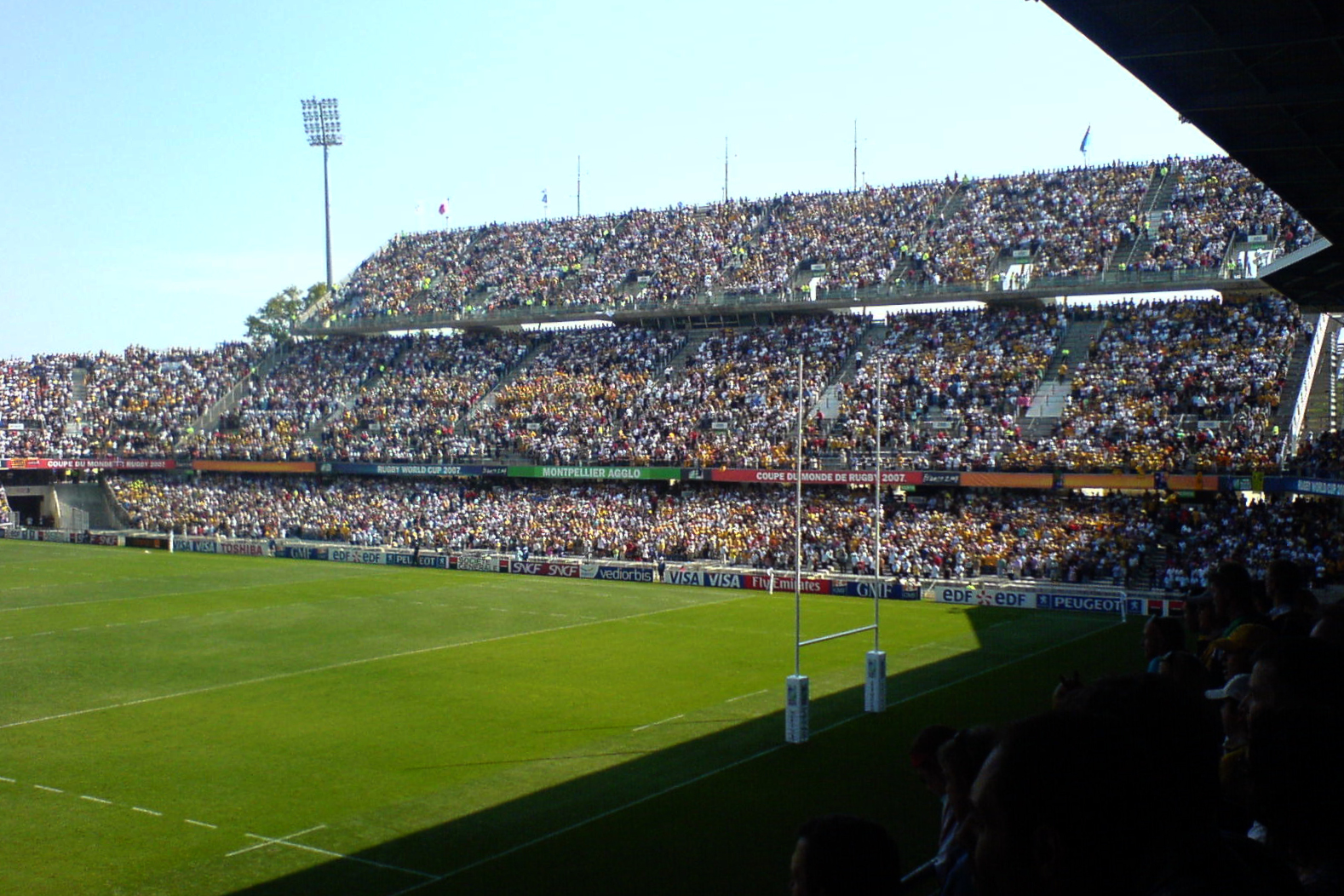
The Stade de la Mosson during a rugby union match between Australia and Fiji at the 2007 Rugby World Cup

The stadium was one of the venues for the 2007 Rugby World Cup.

The stadium hosted a semi-final game in the 2012–13 Heineken Cup between Clermont and Munster on 27 April 2013.

== Rugby league ==
On Saturday 9 June 2012, the stadium hosted rugby league for the first time. The Catalans Dragons continued their policy of playing some home games away from the Stade Gilbert Brutus, Perpignan by playing their Stobart Super League fixture against Wigan Warriors at the stadium. This was the second time the fixture had been played in Montpellier with the previous year's game being held in the Stade Yves-du-Manoir.
