= Mark Warren (referee) =

English football referee

- Full name: Mark Warren
- Born: 4 January 1960 (age 66); Walsall, Staffordshire, England
- Other occupation: Police officer

Domestic
Years	League	Role
1991–1998	Football League	Asst. referee
1998–2007	Football League	Referee

International
Years	League	Role
1994–1998	FIFA listed	Asst. referee

Mark Warren (born 4 January 1960, in Walsall, West Midlands) is an English former football referee, and one of only ten from the United Kingdom to have been a match official in a FIFA World Cup Final.

== Career ==
A police officer by profession, Warren began refereeing in lower leagues in 1978 and was appointed to the list of assistant referees for the Football League in 1991.

He had been an international assistant referee since 1994 when he was selected as an English representative at the FIFA World Cup in France in 1998. He was appointed to the final and ran the line, along with South African Achmat Salie for the referee, the late Said Belqola.

In addition, Warren was the assistant referee in the FA Cup Final in 1995, the 1997 League Cup Final, the 1994 Division One Play-Off Final and the 1994 Charity Shield match.

After assisting in the World Cup Final, Warren graduated to become a Football League referee, leaving the international assistants' list at the end of that year. He had seven years in the middle before stepping down in 2005. He returned to running the line in the Premier League and refereed just one match in 2005–06, the Football Conference North game between Stafford Rangers and Northwich Victoria on 31 December 2005.

He subsequently retired from top-class officiating, as confirmed by his absence from the lists of Football League referees and assistants for the season 2007–08.
