= Epifanio González =

Paraguayan football referee (1958–2026)

Epifanio González Chaves (January 19, 1958 – November 19, 2026) was a Paraguayan football referee. He was known for supervising three matches in the 1998 FIFA World Cup in France. Footballer Gabriel González is his brother.

He was also a referee analyst for Tiro Directo presented by Luis Enrique Perez and Solo Fútbol presented by Mario Ramírez.

González died on November 19, 2026, at the age of 68.
