= Denílson (footballer, born 1977) =

Brazilian footballer

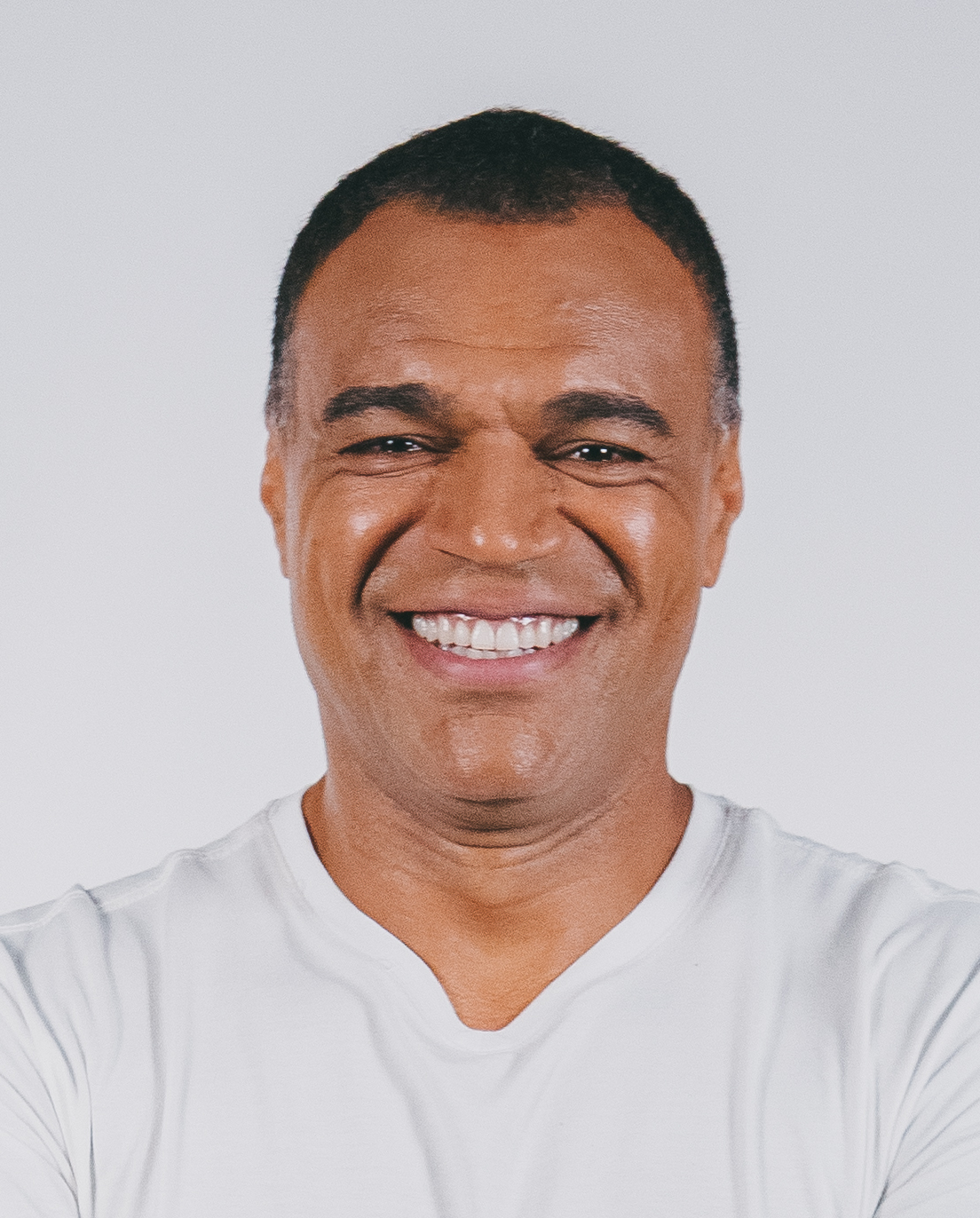
- Denilson in 2021

Personal information
- Full name: Denílson de Oliveira
- Date of birth: 24 August 1977 (age 49)
- Place of birth: Diadema, Brazil
- Height: 1.78 m (5 ft 10 in)
- Position: Winger

Youth career
- São Paulo

Senior career*
Years	Team	Apps	(Gls)
1994–1998	São Paulo	123	(16)
1998–2005	Real Betis	185	(12)
2000	→ Flamengo (loan)	11	(3)
2005–2006	Bordeaux	31	(3)
2006–2007	Al Nassr	15	(3)
2007	FC Dallas	8	(1)
2008	Palmeiras	45	(6)
2009	Itumbiara	0	(0)
2009	Hải Phòng	1	(1)
2010	Kavala	0	(0)
Total		331	(39)

International career
1996–2003	Brazil	61	(8)
Medal record
Men's football
Representing Brazil
FIFA World Cup
Winner	2002 Korea/Japan
Runner-up	1998 France
Copa América
Winner	1997 Bolivia
FIFA Confederations Cup
Winner	1997 Saudi Arabia
CONCACAF Gold Cup
Third place	1998 United States
- * Club domestic league appearances and goals

Denílson de Oliveira (born 24 August 1977), known simply as Denílson or sometimes Denílson Show, is a Brazilian football pundit and former professional player who played as a winger.

In a 17-year career, he played mainly for São Paulo and Real Betis, who made him the world's most expensive player in 1998. He also appeared for teams in five other countries during his career.

Denílson gained more than 60 caps for Brazil, making his full debut before his 20th birthday. He represented the nation in six international tournaments, including two FIFA World Cups, winning the 2002 edition. Denílson formerly held the record for the most appearances as a substitute in the World Cup.

== Club career ==
=== São Paulo and Betis ===
Born in Diadema, São Paulo, Denílson made his senior debuts with local São Paulo at the age of only 17, appearing with the team in the 1994 Copa CONMEBOL and winning the tournament.

In 1998, he broke the world-record transfer fee when Real Betis paid £21.5 million for his services. He made his La Liga debut on 29 August in a 0–0 away draw against Alavés, and finished his first season with 35 games and two goals as his team ranked in 11th position; the Andalusians were relegated to Segunda División in 2000.

Denílson spent some months back in his country with Flamengo, on loan, but returned in January 2001 to be a productive attacking unit for Betis as it achieved promotion back (21 games, one goal). He continued to be regularly played in the following top flight campaigns, but more often than not as a substitute.

In 2004–05 Betis finished in fourth position and qualified to the UEFA Champions League, also adding the season's Copa del Rey, but Denílson was only a fringe player now, starting in just three games and playing only 290 minutes.

=== Bordeaux ===
In the 2005 off-season, Denílson was sold to French club Bordeaux for an undisclosed amount, four years before his Betis contract was due to expire. In his only season in Ligue 1, he appeared regularly to help Bordeaux to a second-place finish, albeit trailing eventual champions Lyon by 15 points.

As the team failed to match Denílson's wage demands, he left and signed for Saudi Arabia's Al Nassr, where he played for a couple of months.

=== FC Dallas ===
On 24 August 2007, Denílson joined FC Dallas of Major League Soccer, becoming the team's designated player. He made his MLS debut on 1 September, entering in the 55th minute against D.C. United, and the following week he made his first start, against Toronto FC at Pizza Hut Park, scoring from the penalty spot in the 36th minute of an eventual 2–0 win.

After only one goal and no assists, Denílson was excluded from Dallas' squad for their appearance in the final of the U.S. Open Cup, raising questions of whether he would remain with the club following the season (even though Open Cup regulations allowed no more than five foreign players on the game-day roster). Further fueling speculation, head coach Steve Morrow said the player would need to "earn a spot in the starting lineup like everybody else"; goalkeeper Darío Sala added the team was having problems adjusting to a change in tactics to accommodate Denílson.

=== Later years ===
At the end of the season, FC Dallas decided not to pick up its option on Denílson, but stated their desire to resign the winger at a lower salary. In February 2008, he signed a one-year performance-based contract with Palmeiras, hoping the club structure and experienced coach Vanderlei Luxemburgo would help him recover his best form. He was unable to make the starting squad, spending most of the season as a bench option; nonetheless, he helped Verdão to the São Paulo State Championship and a berth in the Copa Libertadores after a fourth-place finish in the league.

On 6 January 2009, Denílson was taken on trial by Premier League side Bolton Wanderers with a chance to sign a contract until the end of the campaign. He stated: "I want to play in Europe, but I am not in a rush. I have received proposals from England, Greece, Turkey and Germany. I am studying them," further adding: "I understand that this is the time to return to European football, but if I am not convinced by any offer I hope to continue in Brazil, where there are also clubs interested in me." However, nothing came of the trial.

After terminating his contract with Palmeiras, 31-year-old Denílson signed a three-month contract with Itumbiara. On 2 June 2009 he penned a six-month deal with Vietnamese club Hải Phòng on a pay-as-you-play contract. He made his debut on the 21st against Hoàng Anh Gia Lai, scoring through a free kick just two minutes into the game, but left after only three weeks with the team with only that single appearance to his credit due to injury. Denílson was paid $12,000 for the match and a $5,000 bonus for the goal.

In January 2010, Denílson signed a two-year contract with Kavala in Greece. He was released on 16 April of that year without having played any games.

== International career ==
Denílson made his debut for Brazil in November 1996 at the age of 19 against Cameroon. In 1997, Denílson was selected for the 1997 Copa América and the 1997 FIFA Confederations Cup, winning both tournaments and totalling ten appearances (two goals); the following year, he was selected for the squad that competed at the 1998 FIFA World Cup, appearing in every match for the eventual runners-up.

Denílson was picked by manager Luiz Felipe Scolari for his 2002 World Cup squad in Japan and South Korea. He made five appearances, all as a substitute, as the Seleção won its fifth World Cup. He played one minute in the final against Germany.

After Carlos Alberto Parreira returned for his third spell as national team boss, Denílson was not called up again. He gained a total of 61 caps, scoring 8 international goals.

== Style of play ==
A creative and technically gifted left-footed player, Denílson usually played as a left winger either in midfield or up-front, and was mainly known for his pace, flair, and dribbling skills, in particular for his use of several tricks and feints to beat opponents, such as the step over, which he frequently employed; however, he was also infamous for his inability to score consistently in front of goal, and for his tendency to pick up bookings. Despite his lack of end product, his exceptional ball-retention abilities were utilized strategically on the international stage. During Brazil's victorious 2002 FIFA World Cup campaign, he was frequently deployed as a tactical late substitute to retain possession, run down the clock, and frustrate opponents. This specific role earned him the record for the most substitute appearances in World Cup history (11), immortalized by a famous sequence in the 2002 World Cup semifinal against Turkey where he drew four opposing defenders (Tugay Kerimoğlu, Bülent Korkmaz, Alpay Özalan and Muzzy Izzet) to the corner flag. Despite the talent demonstrated in his youth, he was considered by several pundits not to have fulfilled the potential he showed at the start of his career in both Brazilian club and international football, as he struggled to replicate a similar level of performance in European football.

== Media ==
Denílson was sponsored by sportswear company Nike, and appeared in commercials for the brand. In a global advertising campaign in the run-up to the 2002 World Cup in Korea and Japan, he starred in a "Secret Tournament" commercial (branded "Scorpion KO") directed by Terry Gilliam, appearing alongside football players such as Fabio Cannavaro, Hernán Crespo, Edgar Davids, Rio Ferdinand, Luís Figo, Paul Scholes, Thierry Henry, Gaizka Mendieta, Hidetoshi Nakata, Ronaldinho, Ronaldo and Francesco Totti, among others, with former player Eric Cantona the tournament "referee". In March 2017, Denilson signed with 888poker as a brand ambassador.

== Post-retirement ==
After retiring, Denílson worked as a sports commentator for Rede Bandeirantes.

== Career statistics ==
=== Club ===
Appearances and goals by club, season and competition
Club	Season	League			State league		Cup		Continental		Other		Total	
Club	Season	Division	Apps	Goals	Apps	Goals	Apps	Goals	Apps	Goals	Apps	Goals	Apps	Goals
São Paulo	1994	Série A	0	0	–		–		–		9	1	9	1
São Paulo	1995	Série A	18	1	20	1	5	0	6	1	10	2	59	5
São Paulo	1996	Série A	18	3	23	3	1	0	3	0	7	2	52	8
São Paulo	1997	Série A	14	0	18	2	4	2	5	1	8	0	49	5
São Paulo	1998	Série A	0	0	12	6	4	0	–		6	1	22	7
São Paulo	Total		50	4	73	12	14	2	14	2	40	6	191	26
Real Betis	1998–99	La Liga	35	2	–		0	0	4	0	–		39	2
Real Betis	1999–00	La Liga	32	3	–		0	0	–		–		32	3
Real Betis	2000–01	Segunda División	21	1	–		0	0	–		–		21	1
Real Betis	2001–02	La Liga	34	3	–		0	0	–		–		34	3
Real Betis	2002–03	La Liga	25	1	–		0	0	4	1	–		29	3
Real Betis	2003–04	La Liga	28	2	–		2	0	–		–		30	2
Real Betis	2004–05	La Liga	10	0	–		2	0	–		–		12	0
Real Betis	2005–06	La Liga	0	0	–		–		1	0	–		1	0
Real Betis	Total		185	21	–		4	0	9	1	–		198	14
Flamengo (loan)	2000	Série A	11	3	–		–		6	1	–		17	4
Bordeaux	2005–06	Ligue 1	31	3	–		–		–		–		31	3
Al-Nassr	2006	Saudi Pro League	15	3	–		–		–		–		15	3
FC Dallas	2007	MLS	8	1	–		1 (Note: Appearances in the U.S. Open Cup)	0	–		1 (Note: Appearances in the MLS Cup playoffs)	0	10	1
Palmeiras	2008	Série A	30	3	15	3	4	0	6	1	–		55	7
Itumbiara	2009	Série D	0	0	–		1	0	–		–		1	0
Hai Phong	2009	V.League 1	1	1	–		–		–		–		1	1
Career total			331	39	88	15	24	2	35	5	41	6	517	59

=== International ===
Appearances and goals by national team and year
National team	Year	Apps	Goals
Brazil	1996	2	0
Brazil	1997	18	5
Brazil	1998	16	0
Brazil	1999	2	0
Brazil	2000	3	0
Brazil	2001	10	2
Brazil	2002	9	1
Brazil	2003	1	0
Total		61	8

Scores and results list Brazil's goal tally first, score column indicates score after each Denílson goal.

List of international goals scored by Denílson
No.	Date	Venue	Opponent	Score	Result	Competition	Ref.
1	26 June 1997	Estadio Ramón Tahuichi Aguilera, Santa Cruz, Bolivia	Peru	1–0	7–0	1997 Copa América	
2	10 September 1997	Estádio Fonte Nova, Salvador, Brazil	Ecuador	1–0	4–2	Friendly	
3	9 October 1997	Mangueirão, Belém, Brazil	Morocco	1–0	2–0	Friendly	
4	9 October 1997	Mangueirão, Belém, Brazil	Morocco	2–0	2–0	Friendly	
5	16 December 1997	King Fahd International Stadium, Riyadh, Saudi Arabia	Mexico	2–1	3–2	1997 FIFA Confederations Cup	
6	15 July 2001	Estadio Olímpico Pascual Guerrero, Cali, Colombia	Peru	2–0	2–0	2001 Copa América	
7	18 July 2001	Estadio Olímpico Pascual Guerrero, Cali, Colombia	Paraguay	3–1	3–1	2001 Copa América	
8	25 May 2002	Bukit Jalil National Stadium, Kuala Lumpur, Malaysia	Malaysia	3–0	4–0	Friendly	

== Honours ==
São Paulo

- Copa CONMEBOL: 1994
- Campeonato Paulista: 1998

Betis

- Copa del Rey: 2004–05

Palmeiras

- Campeonato Paulista: 2008

Brazil

- FIFA World Cup: 2002; runner-up: 1998
- Copa América: 1997
- FIFA Confederations Cup: 1997
- CONCACAF Gold Cup third place: 1998

Individual

- FIFA Confederations Cup Golden Ball: 1997
- FIFA Confederations Cup Team of the Tournament: 1997
- South American Team of the Year: 1997
