= Said Belqola =

Moroccan football referee (1956–2002)

- Full name: Said Belqola
- Born: 30 August 1956; Tiflet, Morocco
- Died: 15 June 2002 (aged 45); Rabat, Morocco
- Other occupation: Customs officer

Domestic
Years	League	Role
1979–1986	League	Referee
1987–1989	Inter-league	Referee
1990–1992	Federal	Referee

International
Years	League	Role
1993–2002	FIFA listed	Referee

Said Belqola (Arabic: سعيد بلقولة; 30 August 1956 – 15 June 2002) was a Moroccan football referee, best known for officiating the 1998 FIFA World Cup final between Brazil and France, being the first African referee to officiate a World Cup final.

== Career ==
Belqola's international career began when he was appointed to the international list in 1993, going on to referee the match between hosts France and eventual champions England at the Tournoi de France in 1997. He was also among the referees at the final tournaments of the Africa Cup of Nations in 1996 and 1998, officiating two matches at each tournament, including the 1998 final where Egypt faced South Africa. At the 1998 FIFA World Cup, he also officiated two group matches (Germany vs. USA and Argentina vs. Croatia). In the final of the tournament, he controversially sent off French defender Marcel Desailly after a double booking; hosts France defeated defending champions Brazil 3–0.

== Personal life ==
Belqola was born in Tiflet, Morocco and worked in Fez as a civil servant (he was a customs officer).

Belqola died on 15 June 2002 in Rabat, after a long battle against cancer. He was buried in Tiflet, Morocco.

== Major matches refereed ==
Date	Match	Tournament	Venue	Result	Ref
28 February 1998	South Africa vs. Egypt	1998 African Cup of Nations final	Stade du 4-Août, Ouagadougou	0–2	
12 July 1998	Brazil vs. France	1998 FIFA World Cup final	Stade de France, Saint-Denis	0–3	

== Honours ==
- Best Arab Referee: 1998

Sporting positions (Morocco) Said Belqola
Preceded by 1994 FIFA World Cup Final (Hungary) Sándor Puhl	1998 FIFA World Cup Final Referee	Succeeded by 2002 FIFA World Cup Final (Italy) Pierluigi Collina
