= Marko Lazarević =

Serbian footballer

Personal information
- Full name: Marko Lazarević
- Date of birth: 28 February 1994 (age 32)
- Place of birth: Belgrade, FR Yugoslavia
- Height: 1.93 m (6 ft 4 in)
- Position: Goalkeeper

Team information
- Current team: Brodarac

Youth career
- Partizan

Senior career*
| Years | Team | Apps | (Gls) |
| 2012–2013 | Teleoptik | 3 | (0) |
| 2013 | Napredak Kruševac | 0 | (0) |
| 2014 | Sinđelić Beograd | 0 | (0) |
| 2014–2015 | Brodarac 1947 | 27 | (0) |
| 2015 | Rudar Pljevlja | 0 | (0) |
| 2015–2016 | Brodarac 1947 | 28 | (2) |
| 2016 | Bežanija | 14 | (0) |
| 2017 | Rad | 0 | (0) |
| 2017 | Arouca | 0 | (0) |
| 2018 | Radnički Beograd | 12 | (0) |
| 2018–2019 | Partizan | 0 | (0) |
| 2018–2019 | → Radnički Beograd (loan) | 25 | (1) |
| 2019–2020 | Radnički Beograd | | |
| 2020–2022 | BASK | | |
| 2022–2024 | Radnički Beograd | 32 | (0) |
| 2024– | Brodarac | | |
- * Club domestic league appearances and goals as of 26 December 2023

Marko Lazarević (Serbian Cyrillic: Марко Лазаревић; born 28 February 1994) is a Serbian footballer who plays as goalkeeper for Brodarac 1947.

== Club career ==
After passing the Partizan youth school, Lazarević started his senior career with Teleoptik, earning 3 caps in the 2012–13 Serbian First League season. In summer 2013, he signed with Napredak Kruševac, but he left the club at the beginning of 2014, and joined Sinđelić Beograd for the next six months.

After a season he spent as a captain of Brodarac 1947 in the Serbian League Belgrade, making 27 league caps, Lazarević moved to Rudar Pljevlja in summer 2015. After the club got eliminated in UEFA qualifications, he returned to Brodarac 1947 for the rest of the 2015–16 season. During the season, Lazarević made 28 caps and also scored 2 goals in matches against Dorćol and IMT, both from penalty kicks.

In summer 2016, Lazarević made a deal with Serbian First League side Bežanija, where he 15 appearances for the first half-season. On 28 January 2017, Lazarević signed with Rad.

In summer same year, Lazarević moved to Portuguese side Arouca, signing with the club for the 2017–18 LigaPro season. At the beginning of 2018, Lazarević signed with Radnički Beograd.

In July 2018, Lazarević rejoined Partizan for his second spell with the club, where he passed youth categories. He signed a one-and-a-half-year contract keeping him until the end of 2019. Shortly after he returned to Radnički Beograd on one-year loan deal.

== Career statistics ==
As of 16 February 2020

Appearances and goals by club, season and competition
| Club | Season | League | | | Cup | | League Cup | | Continental | | Other | | Total | |
| Club | Season | Division | Apps | Goals | Apps | Goals | Apps | Goals | Apps | Goals | Apps | Goals | Apps | Goals |
|---|---|---|---|---|---|---|---|---|---|---|---|---|---|---|
| Teleoptik | 2012–13 | Serbian First League | 3 | 0 | 0 | 0 | — | | — | | — | | 3 | 0 |
| Napredak Kruševac | 2013–14 | Serbian SuperLiga | 0 | 0 | 0 | 0 | — | | — | | — | | 0 | 0 |
| Sinđelić Beograd | 2013–14 | Serbian First League | 0 | 0 | 0 | 0 | — | | — | | — | | 0 | 0 |
| Brodarac 1947 | 2014–15 | Serbian League Belgrade | 27 | 0 | — | | — | | — | | — | | 27 | 0 |
| Brodarac 1947 | 2015–16 | Serbian League Belgrade | 28 | 2 | — | | — | | — | | — | | 28 | 2 |
| Brodarac 1947 | Total | | 55 | 2 | — | | — | | — | | — | | 55 | 2 |
| Rudar Pljevlja | 2015–16 | Montenegrin First League | 0 | 0 | 0 | 0 | — | | 0 | 0 | — | | 0 | 0 |
| Bežanija | 2016–17 | Serbian First League | 14 | 0 | 1 | 0 | — | | — | | — | | 15 | 0 |
| Rad | 2016–17 | Serbian SuperLiga | 0 | 0 | — | | — | | — | | — | | 0 | 0 |
| Arouca | 2017–18 | LigaPro | 0 | 0 | 0 | 0 | 0 | 0 | — | | — | | 0 | 0 |
| Radnički Beograd | 2017–18 | Serbian League Belgrade | 12 | 0 | — | | — | | — | | — | | 12 | 0 |
| Radnički Beograd (loan) | 2018–19 | Serbian League Belgrade | 25 | 1 | — | | — | | — | | — | | 25 | 1 |
| Radnički Beograd (loan) | Total | | 37 | 1 | — | | — | | — | | — | | 37 | 1 |
| Career total | | | 109 | 3 | 1 | 0 | 0 | 0 | 0 | 0 | — | | 110 | 3 |
