= Nemanja Belić =

Serbian footballer (born 1987)

Personal information
- Full name: Nemanja Belić
- Date of birth: 24 April 1987 (age 39)
- Place of birth: Belgrade, SR Serbia, SFR Yugoslavia
- Height: 1.88 m (6 ft 2 in)
- Position: Goalkeeper

Team information
- Current team: Radnički Obrenovac
- Number: 1

Youth career
- Obrenovac 1905
- Radnički Obrenovac
- OFK Beograd
- → Red Star Belgrade (loan)

Senior career*
Years	Team	Apps	(Gls)
2005–2010	OFK Beograd	1	(0)
2006–2008	→ Palilulac Beograd (loan)	34	(0)
2009	→ Sopot (loan)	0	(0)
2009–2010	→ Radnički Obrenovac (loan)	28	(0)
2010–2011	Radnički Obrenovac	39	(0)
2012–2015	Donji Srem	77	(0)
2015–2017	Metalac Gornji Milanovac	70	(0)
2017–2024	Čukarički	57	(0)
2024	IMT	9	(0)
2025	Dubočica	15	(0)
2025–	Radnički Obrenovac	0	(0)
- * Club domestic league appearances and goals as of 25 June 2025

Nemanja Belić (Serbian Cyrillic: Немања Белић; born 24 April 1987) is a Serbian footballer who plays as a goalkeeper for Radnički Obrenovac.

== Club career ==
As like mostly footballers from Obrenovac, Belić made his first football steps with FK Obrenovac 1905, under coach Miodrag Arsović - Arsa. Although he started playing as a defensive midfielder, he became a goalkeeper accidentally. Belić was training with older generation, and after goalkeeper injured during the tournament played at Rudnik, Belić replaced him as a youngest in the team. Later, he was elected for the best goalkeeper of the tournament. After a brief period with Radnički Obrenovac, he moved to OFK Beograd, where he spent next 10 years. He was also loaned to Red Star Belgrade as a youngster. After returning to OFK Beograd, he signed a contract and joined the first team. However, he did not to receive a lot of confidence, after annealing at Palilulac and Sopot, he returned to Radnički Obrenovac.

At the beginning of 2012, Belić received a call from Donji Srem, when Bogić Bogicević, who was a goalkeeper too, recognized his potential. During the first season with club he was mostly used as a backup for a more experienced Dragan Starčević. After club promoted in the Serbian SuperLiga Belić received a chance, and started keeping standardly from the next season. Belić stayed with Donji Srem until the end of 2014–15 season, when club relegated to the Serbian First League again. In summer 2015, Belić signed with Metalac Gornji Milanovac. In summer 2017, Belić signed with Čukarički on free transfer.

== Career statistics ==
As of 31 May 2018

Appearances and goals by club, season and competition
Club	Season	League			Cup		Continental		Other		Total	
Club	Season	Division	Apps	Goals	Apps	Goals	Apps	Goals	Apps	Goals	Apps	Goals
OFK Beograd	2005–06	Serbian SuperLiga	0	0	0	0	0	0	—		0	0
OFK Beograd	2006–07	Serbian SuperLiga	0	0	0	0	0	0	—		0	0
OFK Beograd	2007–08	Serbian SuperLiga	0	0	0	0	0	0	—		0	0
OFK Beograd	2008–09	Serbian SuperLiga	1	0	0	0	0	0	—		1	0
OFK Beograd	2009–10	Serbian SuperLiga	—		—		—		—		—	
OFK Beograd	Total		1	0	0	0	0	0	—		1	0
Palilulac Beograd (loan)	2006–07	Serbian League Belgrade	14	0	—		—		—		14	0
Palilulac Beograd (loan)	2007–08	Serbian League Belgrade	12	0	—		—		—		12	0
Palilulac Beograd (loan)	2008–09	Serbian League Belgrade	8	0	—		—		—		8	0
Palilulac Beograd (loan)	Total		34	0	—		—		—		34	0
Sopot (loan)	2008–09	Serbian League Belgrade	0	0	—		—		—		0	0
Radnički Obrenovac (loan)	2009–10	Serbian League Belgrade	28	0	—		—		—		28	0
Radnički Obrenovac	2010–11	Serbian League Belgrade	25	0	—		—		—		25	0
Radnički Obrenovac	2011–12	Serbian League Belgrade	14	0	—		—		—		14	0
Radnički Obrenovac	Total		67	0	—		—		—		67	0
Donji Srem	2011–12	Serbian First League	6	0	—		—		—		6	0
Donji Srem	2012–13	Serbian SuperLiga	21	0	1	0	—		—		22	0
Donji Srem	2013–14	Serbian SuperLiga	30	0	3	0	—		—		33	0
Donji Srem	2014–15	Serbian SuperLiga	20	0	1	0	—		—		21	0
Donji Srem	Total		77	0	5	0	—		—		82	0
Metalac Gornji Milanovac	2015–16	Serbian SuperLiga	34	0	0	0	—		—		34	0
Metalac Gornji Milanovac	2016–17	Serbian SuperLiga	36	0	1	0	—		—		37	0
Metalac Gornji Milanovac	Total		70	0	1	0	—		—		71	1
Čukarički	2017–18	Serbian SuperLiga	17	0	5	0	—		—		22	0
Career total			266	0	11	0	0	0	—		277	0
