= Stefan Dražić =

Serbian footballer (born 1992)

Personal information
- Date of birth: 14 August 1992 (age 34)
- Place of birth: Belgrade, FR Yugoslavia
- Height: 1.87 m (6 ft 2 in)
- Position: Forward

Team information
- Current team: CFR Cluj
- Number: 9

Youth career
- –2002: Obrenovac 1905
- 2002–2004: Red Star Belgrade
- 2004–2008: Radnički Obrenovac

Senior career*
Years	Team	Apps	(Gls)
2008–2013	Radnički Obrenovac	124	(46)
2013–2016	Javor Ivanjica	91	(24)
2016–2017	Voždovac	34	(8)
2017–2018	Mechelen	16	(1)
2018–2019	Mezőkövesd	42	(14)
2019	Changchun Yatai	11	(1)
2020–2021	Diósgyőr	29	(4)
2021–2024	Mezőkövesd	92	(29)
2024–2026	APOEL	65	(20)
2026–	CFR Cluj	13	(7)

International career
2010	Serbia U18		
2011–2012	Serbia U20	6	(3)
- * Club domestic league appearances and goals as of 31 October 2026

Stefan Dražić (Serbian Cyrillic: Стефан Дражић; born 14 August 1992) is a Serbian professional footballer who plays as a forward for Liga I club CFR Cluj.

== Club career ==
=== Radnički Obrenovac ===
Dražić started playing football with FK Obrenovac 1905, and later was with Red Star Belgrade youth selections for two years. Next he returned in Obrenovac and joined Radnički, where he ended youth career, and after that he joined the first team for the 2008–09 season. He made 12 league appearances and scored 4 goals, although he was 16. After first senior season, he was more experienced, and he more constant in the first squad. For 2009–10 season, Dražić made 26 appearances and scored 6 goals. For the 2010–11 season, he made 28 appearances and scored 7 goals. He was nominated for man of the match three times. In new season, for the difference of previous he played one more match and scored one more goal, so he ended the 2011–12 season with 29 caps and 8 goals. The fifth season with club from Obrenovac was the best for Stefan Dražić. After 25 league goals in his previous career, for the 2012–13 season he scored 21 goals on 29 matches and was named as a man of the match nine times with average rating 7.43.

=== Javor Ivanjica ===
Dražić was on trials and trained with Twente for two times as a member of Radnički Obrenovac, but he did not sign with club from Netherlands. He joined Javor Ivanjica in summer 2013, and scored his first goal for new club on his SuperLiga debut, against Red Star Belgrade. After that match Ifeanyi Onyilo transferred to Red Star Belgrade, and Dražić got more space in attack. Although Javor maybe had the best team than previous 10 years, the team was relegated to First League after the end of season. Dražić had 25 league appearances and scored 4 goals, and also played 1 cup match until the end of season. Behind the relegation from SuperLiga, Dražić definitely became the first choice as a centre forward, in new season, and he justified expectations, being the best scorer of Serbian First League in 2014–15 season with 13 goals. He had all 30 starts in league, and also played 1 cup match. Dražić and Ana Subotić were nominated for the best sportspeople of Ivanjica in 2014. Although some clubs interested for attacker, he started new season with the same club. He scored his first goal in 2015–16, in the 2nd fixture, against Spartak Subotica. Second goal in season he scored in away match against Voždovac in the 9th fixture. In 14th fixture, against Partizan, Dražić scored first goal on the match, but Javor lost that match. He was a scorer in a first semi-final cup match against Borac Čačak.

=== Voždovac ===
Dražić joined FK Voždovac in June 2016. He scored his first goal for new club in 2nd fixture of the 2016–17 Serbian SuperLiga season, against Rad. During the autumn same year, Dražić also scored a goal against Mladost Lučani on 20 August and against Inđija in a cup match played on 21 September 2016. After Ilija Stolica replaced Bratislav Živković as a coach of FK Voždovac, Dražić started next two matches from the bench. Returning in the first squad, Dražić scored a goal and noted an assist for a 2–1 victory in away match against Borac Čačak, played on 30 November 2016, being also nominated for player of the fixture. Dražić was elected as a man of the match in 4–1 victory against Vojvodina on 1 April 2017, scoring a goal and being fouled for a direct free kick. He also scored a goal in the next fixture match, against his ex-club Javor Ivanjica.

=== Mechelen ===
On 7 July 2017, Dražić signed a three-year contract with the Belgian side Mechelen. He scored on his debut for new club in 1–1 draw against Standard Liège on 30 July 2017.

=== Mezőkövesd ===
On 5 May 2018, he scored the first goal at the opening match of the Diósgyőri Stadion in the 2017–18 Nemzeti Bajnokság I season against Diósgyőri VTK.

=== Changchun Yatai ===
Dražić joined China League One club Changchun Yatai in July 2019, providing an assist on his debut, a 3–1 away victory over Nei Mongol Zhongyou.

== Career statistics ==
As of 31 October 2026

Appearances and goals by club, season and competition
Club	Season	League			National cup (Note: Includes Serbian Cup, Belgian Cup, Magyar Kupa, Cypriot Cup, Cupa României)		Continental		Other		Total	
Club	Season	Division	Apps	Goals	Apps	Goals	Apps	Goals	Apps	Goals	Apps	Goals
Radnički Obrenovac	2008–09	Serbian League Belgrade	12	4	—		—		—		12	4
Radnički Obrenovac	2009–10	Serbian League Belgrade	26	6	—		—		—		26	6
Radnički Obrenovac	2010–11	Serbian League Belgrade	28	7	—		—		—		28	7
Radnički Obrenovac	2011–12	Serbian League Belgrade	29	8	—		—		—		29	8
Radnički Obrenovac	2012–13	Serbian League Belgrade	29	21	—		—		—		29	21
Radnički Obrenovac	Total		124	46	—		—		—		124	46
Javor Ivanjica	2013–14	Serbian SuperLiga	25	4	1	0	—		—		26	4
Javor Ivanjica	2014–15	Serbian First League	30	13	1	0	—		—		31	13
Javor Ivanjica	2015–16	Serbian SuperLiga	36	7	6	1	—		—		42	8
Javor Ivanjica	Total		91	24	8	1	—		—		99	25
Voždovac	2016–17	Serbian SuperLiga	34	8	2	1	—		—		36	9
Mechelen	2017–18	Belgian First Division A	16	1	1	0	—		—		17	1
Mezőkövesd	2017–18	Nemzeti Bajnokság I	11	3	—		—		—		11	3
Mezőkövesd	2018–19	Nemzeti Bajnokság I	31	11	5	3	—		—		36	14
Mezőkövesd	Total		42	14	5	3	—		—		47	17
Changchun Yatai	2019	China League One	11	1	—		—		—		11	1
Diósgyőr	2020–21	Nemzeti Bajnokság I	29	4	4	0	—		—		33	4
Mezőkövesd	2021–22	Nemzeti Bajnokság I	30	5	2	1	—		—		32	6
Mezőkövesd	2022–23	Nemzeti Bajnokság I	29	14	3	2	—		—		32	16
Mezőkövesd	2023–24	Nemzeti Bajnokság I	33	10	1	0	—		—		34	10
Mezőkövesd	Total		92	29	6	3	—		—		98	32
APOEL	2024–25	Cypriot First Division	34	9	2	1	8 (Note: Four appearances in UEFA Champions League, two appearances in UEFA Europa League, two appearances in UEFA Conference League)	0	0	0	44	10
APOEL	2025–26	Cypriot First Division	31	11	5	0	—		—		36	11
APOEL	Total		65	20	7	1	8	0	0	0	80	21
CFR Cluj	2026–27	Liga I	13	7	1	0	2 (Note: Appearances in UEFA Conference League)	0	—		16	7
Career total			517	134	34	9	10	0	0	0	561	163

== Honours ==
Javor Ivanjica

- Serbian Cup runner-up: 2015–16

APOEL

- Cypriot Super Cup: 2024

Individual

- Serbian First League top scorer: 2014–15 (13 goals)
- Nemzeti Bajnokság I Player of the Month: November 2023
