= Marko Nikolić (football manager) =

Serbian football manager

Personal information
- Date of birth: 20 July 1979 (age 47)
- Place of birth: Belgrade, SR Serbia, SFR Yugoslavia
- Height: 1.85 m (6 ft 1 in)
- Position: Midfielder

Team information
- Current team: AEK Athens (manager)

Youth career
- 1989–1998: Rad

Senior career*
Years	Team	Apps	(Gls)
1998–1999	Rad	0	(0)
1998–1999	→ Dorćol (loan)		

Managerial career
- 2008–2011: Rad
- 2012–2013: Rad
- 2013: Vojvodina
- 2013–2015: Partizan
- 2016: Olimpija Ljubljana
- 2016–2017: Partizan
- 2017–2019: Videoton Fehérvár
- 2020–2021: Lokomotiv Moscow
- 2023–2024: Shabab Al Ahli
- 2024–2025: CSKA Moscow
- 2025–: AEK Athens
- * Club domestic league appearances and goals

Marko Nikolić (Serbian Cyrillic: Марко Николић; born 20 July 1979) is a Serbian professional football manager who is the current manager of Greek Super League club AEK Athens.

== Early life ==
Born in Belgrade, Nikolić joined Rad as a trainee in 1989. He played for the club at all youth levels, together with the likes of Ivica Iliev, Milan Martinović, and Nemanja Vučićević, among others. After completing his formation, Nikolić spent some time on loan with third-tier club Dorćol, before retiring from the game due to an injury.

== Managerial career ==
=== Spells at Rad ===
In his early 20s, Nikolić worked with Rad's youth teams for many years, before being promoted to the senior squad in 2008. He served as assistant manager to both Mihailo Ivanović and Aleksandar Janjić, eventually replacing the latter one on 26 October 2008, after the club earned just five points from the opening nine fixtures. Three days later, Nikolić became the youngest manager ever in the top flight of Serbian football, recording a 1–0 win over Vojvodina. He ultimately managed to save the club from relegation that season, finishing in ninth place. On 23 May 2011, two rounds before the end of the 2010–11 season, Nikolić secured a spot in the 2011–12 UEFA Europa League, but decided to leave the club due to "achieved goals".

On 6 March 2012, Rad appointed Nikolić as manager for the second time. He signed a contract that would keep him at the club until the summer of 2013.

=== Vojvodina ===
On 7 June 2013, Nikolić was appointed manager of Vojvodina. He led the club to the play-off round in the Europa League, but lost to Sheriff Tiraspol 2–3 on aggregate. On 9 December 2013, Nikolić parted company with Vojvodina by mutual agreement.

=== Partizan ===
On 16 December 2013, Nikolić was appointed manager of Partizan, replacing Vuk Rašović. Some of his first signings included his former Vojvodina players Miroslav Vulićević, Petar Škuletić, and Branislav Trajković. On 22 February 2014, Nikolić made his debut in a goalless draw away at Novi Pazar. He eventually failed to defend the league title in the 2013–14 campaign. In the following 2014–15 season, Nikolić qualified to the group stage of the Europa League, finishing bottom of the table. He was somewhat unexpectedly released by the club on 25 March 2015, leaving Partizan in first place and reaching the cup semi-final.

=== Olimpija Ljubljana ===
On 11 January 2016, Nikolić was presented as new manager of Slovenian club Olimpija Ljubljana, penning a two-and-a-half-year contract. He rejoined his countryman Ranko Stojić, the club's director of football, as they previously performed the same roles at Rad. On 10 April 2016, in a league fixture versus Zavrč, Nikolić reportedly called his player, Blessing Eleke, a "black idiot" for elaborately celebrating an injury-time equalizer in an eventual 1–1 draw. He later apologized to the player, club's management, and fans. However, on 14 April 2016, Nikolić received a seven-match ban and was fined €1,500 by the Slovenian FA following the incident. He eventually terminated his contract with the club by mutual consent on 18 April 2016.

=== Return to Partizan ===
On 4 August 2016, Nikolić returned to Partizan on a two-year deal. His first competitive game back in charge of Partizan ended in a 1–3 home loss to Vojvodina three days later. After recording two wins and two losses in the first four matches, Nikolić ran a streak of 37 consecutive games without a loss in both the league and cup (33 wins), eventually winning the double. On 31 May 2017, Nikolić terminated his contract with Partizan upon his request.

=== Videoton ===
On 6 June 2017, Nikolić signed a two-year contract with Hungarian club Videoton. He won the Nemzeti Bajnokság I in his first season in charge.

He managed the club to reach the play-offs of the 2018–19 UEFA Champions League. However, the club was defeated by AEK Athens F.C., therefore, the cub was eligible to play in the group stages of the 2018–19 UEFA Europa League. Vidi beat PAOK FC twice and they drew with Chelsea F.C. However, in the following year Fehérvár FC was beaten by FC Vaduz in the third round of the 2019–20 UEFA Europa League.

On 25 November 2019, he was dismissed by Fehérvár FC after a 3-1 home defeat at the MOL Aréna Sóstó. The club directors expected that Fehérvár could gain more points in the first half of the 2019–20 Nemzeti Bajnokság I season than their rival Ferencváros since Ferencváros played in the 2019–20 UEFA Europa League. However, on the 12 match day Ferencváros led the championship.

=== Lokomotiv Moscow ===
On 14 May 2020, the board of directors of Russian Premier League club Lokomotiv Moscow announced the signing of Nikolić, with contract beginning on 1 June 2020. The Russian league was suspended until that date due to the COVID-19 pandemic in Russia. He replaced Yuri Semin. In the 2020–21 season, Lokomotiv won the Russian Cup and qualified for the Europa League, also finishing in 3rd place in the league table. On 21 May 2021, Lokomotiv extended contract with Nikolić for three additional years. He left Lokomotiv by mutual consent on 5 October 2021.

=== CSKA Moscow ===
On 6 June 2024, Nikolić signed a two-season contract with CSKA Moscow in Russia. He was chosen Russian Premier League manager of the month for March 2025 and for April 2025. CSKA finished third in the 2024–25 Russian Premier League and won the 2024–25 Russian Cup. Nikolić resigned from CSKA on 9 June 2025.

=== AEK Athens ===
On 14 June 2025, Nikolić signed a two-year contract with Greek Super League club AEK Athens. On 8 June 2026, his contract was extended until 2029.

== Managerial statistics ==
As of 21 November 2026

Team	From	To	Record				
Team	From	To	P	W	D	L	Win %
(Serbia) Rad	26 October 2008	23 May 2011	86	31	28	27	36.05
(Serbia) Rad	6 March 2012	7 June 2013	47	20	10	17	42.55
(Serbia) Vojvodina	7 June 2013	9 December 2013	26	12	10	4	46.15
(Serbia) Partizan	16 December 2013	25 March 2015	50	34	10	6	68.00
(Slovenia) Olimpija Ljubljana	11 January 2016	18 April 2016	8	4	4	0	50.00
(Serbia) Partizan	4 August 2016	31 May 2017	40	34	4	2	85.00
(Hungary) Fehérvár	6 June 2017	25 November 2019	120	69	27	24	57.50
(Russia) Lokomotiv Moscow	1 June 2020	5 October 2021	64	29	18	17	45.31
(United Arab Emirates) Shabab Al Ahli	2 June 2023	29 May 2024	31	19	4	8	61.29
(Russia) CSKA Moscow	1 June 2024	9 June 2025	43	23	13	7	53.49
(Greece) AEK Athens	14 June 2025	Present	73	45	17	11	61.64
Total			589	320	146	123	54.33

== Honours ==
=== Manager ===
Partizan

- Serbian SuperLiga: 2016–17
- Serbian Cup: 2016–17

Fehérvár

- Nemzeti Bajnokság I: 2017–18
- Hungarian Cup: 2018–19

Lokomotiv Moscow

- Russian Cup: 2020–21

Shabab Al Ahli

- UAE Super Cup: 2023

CSKA Moscow

- Russian Cup: 2024–25

AEK Athens

- Super League Greece: 2025–26

=== Individual ===
- Serbian SuperLiga Manager of the Season: 2016–17
- Russian Premier League Manager of the Month: March 2025, April 2025.
- Super League Greece Manager of the Season: 2025–26
