= Blažo Bulatović =

Serbian football manager and player

Personal information
- Full name: Blažo Bulatović
- Date of birth: 18 September 1990 (age 36)
- Place of birth: Belgrade, SR Serbia, SFR Yugoslavia
- Height: 1.83 m (6 ft 0 in)
- Position: Midfielder

Team information
- Current team: Fujairah

Youth career
- GSP Polet
- Obilić
- 2008–2009: Rad

Senior career*
Years	Team	Apps	(Gls)
2009–2010	Rad	0	(0)
2009–2010	→ Dorćol (loan)	27	(9)
2010	Napredak Kruševac	8	(1)
2011	Čukarički	0	(0)
2011–2013	BSK Borča	21	(2)
2013–2014	Smederevo	11	(3)
2014–2015	Budućnost Podgorica	1	(0)
2015	Sinđelić Beograd	0	(0)
2016	Dorćol		
Total		68	(15)

Managerial career
- 2020: Zvezdara
- 2021: Libya (assistant)
- 2021: Jedinstvo Surčin
- 2021–2022: Studentski Grad
- 2023: Prva Iskra
- 2023: Sloboda Užice
- 2024: Čukarički (assistant)
- 2026-: Fujairah
- * Club domestic league appearances and goals

Blažo Bulatović (Serbian Cyrillic: Блажо Булатовић; born 18 September 1990) is a Serbian football manager and former player.

== Playing career ==
After completing his formation at Rad, Bulatović made his senior debut with Dorćol in the 2009–10 Serbian League Belgrade. He later spent two seasons with Serbian SuperLiga club BSK Borča from 2011 to 2013, making 21 appearances and scoring twice. In the summer of 2014, Bulatović moved to Montenegro and signed with Budućnost Podgorica.

== Managerial career ==
In the summer of 2023, Bulatović took over as manager of Serbian First League club Sloboda Užice.

== Personal life ==
His father, Branko Bulatović, was general secretary of the Football Association of Serbia and Montenegro at the time of his assassination in 2004.
