= Lazar Pajović =

Serbian footballer

Personal information
- Date of birth: 26 August 1991 (age 35)
- Place of birth: Novi Pazar, SFR Yugoslavia
- Height: 1.86 m (6 ft 1 in)
- Position: Centre-back

Youth career
- AS Novi Pazar
- Novi Pazar
- OFK Beograd

Senior career*
Years	Team	Apps	(Gls)
2009–2012	Hajduk Beograd	70	(4)
2012	Kolubara	0	(0)
2013	Hajduk Beograd	10	(0)
2013	Sopot	3	(0)
2014–2017	Novi Pazar	31	(1)
2017	Borac Čačak	4	(0)
2018–2019	Petrovac	44	(0)
2019–2021	Novi Pazar	17	(0)
- * Club domestic league appearances and goals as of 19 May 2021

Lazar Pajović (Serbian Cyrillic: Лазар Пајовић; born 26 August 1991) is a Serbian footballer. He can perform as a centre-back, or as a defensive midfielder eventually.

== Club career ==
=== Hajduk Beograd ===
Born in Novi Pazar, Pajović started playing football with local football "AS" academy. In 2007, he joined FK Novi Pazar, and later moved to OFK Beograd, where he completed his youth categories. He has begun his senior career with Hajduk Beograd in 2009 and made 25 Serbian League Belgrade caps for the 2009–10 season. Pajović also continued playing for the club and scored 2 goals for each of the next 2 seasons, collecting 70 league matches with 4 goals at total between 2009 and 2012. After he spent the first half of the 2012–13 season as a member of the Serbian First League side Kolubara without official matches, Pajović returned to Hajduk Beograd, where he spent the rest of season.

=== Novi Pazar ===
After he spent the first half of 2013–14 Serbian League Belgrade season playing with FK Sopot, making just 3 league appearances until the winter break off-season, Pajović returned to his home town and joined FK Novi Pazar at the beginning of 2014. Pajović made his Serbian SuperLiga debut for Novi Pazar in the last fixture match of the 2013–14 season, against Radnički Niš, but he got a red card during the first half. Pajović also made 2 league caps for the next season. In summer 2015, Pajović played several friendly matches during the pre-season and scored 1 goal, in 1–0 victory against Velež Mostar. During the regular season, he noted 10 caps for the 2015–16 Serbian SuperLiga season, scoring a goal in the last fixture match against Metalac Gornji Milanovac. In a match Spartak Subotica, played on 15 May 2016, he succeeded a captain armbrand after Irfan Vusljanin was substituted off. Pajović also started 2016–17 season as a starting centre-back, pairing with Miloš Tintor, but after he earned red card in the opening match against Javor Ivanjica, he was replacing by Darko Stanojević from the next fixture match. After Tintor's injury, Pajović returned in squad for the postponed match of the first fixture, against Vojvodina, played on 14 September 2016. Pajović made his first SuperLiga assist in the 17 fixture match of 2016–17 season, against Javor Ivanjica, when he passed a ball to Enver Alivodić for a goal. In summer 2017, Pajović left the club as a free agent.

=== Borac Čačak ===
Several days after he left his former club, Pajović joined Borac Čačak on 21 July 2017.

== Career statistics ==
As of 22 March 2017

Club	Season	League			Cup		Continental		Other		Total	
Club	Season	Division	Apps	Goals	Apps	Goals	Apps	Goals	Apps	Goals	Apps	Goals
Hajduk Beograd	2009–10	Serbian League Belgrade	25	0	—		—		—		25	0
Hajduk Beograd	2010–11	Serbian League Belgrade	24	2	—		—		—		24	2
Hajduk Beograd	2011–12	Serbian League Belgrade	21	2	—		—		—		21	2
Hajduk Beograd	2012–13	Serbian League Belgrade	10	0	—		—		—		10	0
Hajduk Beograd	Total		80	4	—		—		—		80	4
Kolubara	2012–13	Serbian First League	0	0	0	0	—		—		0	0
Sopot	2013–14	Serbian League Belgrade	3	0	—		—		—		3	0
Novi Pazar	2013–14	Serbian SuperLiga	1	0	0	0	—		—		1	0
Novi Pazar	2014–15	Serbian SuperLiga	2	0	0	0	—		—		2	0
Novi Pazar	2015–16	Serbian SuperLiga	10	1	0	0	—		—		10	1
Novi Pazar	2016–17	Serbian SuperLiga	18	0	1	0	—		—		19	0
Novi Pazar	Total		31	1	1	0	—		—		32	1
Borac Čačak	2017–18	Serbian SuperLiga	0	0	0	0	—		—		0	0
Career total			114	5	1	0	—		—		115	5
