= Xu Yang (footballer, born 1987) =

Chinese footballer

Xu Yang 徐洋
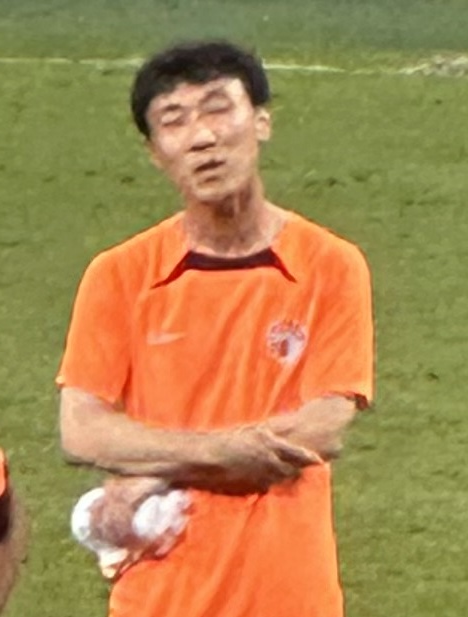
- Xu Yang in August 2024

Personal information
- Full name: Xu Yang
- Date of birth: 18 June 1987 (age 39)
- Place of birth: Qingdao, Shandong, China
- Height: 1.72 m (5 ft 8 in)
- Positions: Left midfielder; left-back

Youth career
- 2000–2005: Shandong Luneng

Senior career*
Years	Team	Apps	(Gls)
2006	Shandong Luneng	0	(0)
2006–2007	FK Beograd	0	(0)
2007–2008	Shandong Luneng	0	(0)
2008–2015	Henan Jianye	202	(24)
2016–2017	Chongqing Lifan	49	(1)
2018–2020	Shenzhen FC	34	(2)
2021	Zibo Cuju	13	(1)
2021	Heilongjiang Ice City	18	(0)
2022	Shaanxi Chang'an Athletic	4	(0)
2022–2024	Qingdao Hainiu	30	(3)

International career^{‡}
2009	China	1	(0)
- * Club domestic league appearances and goals as of 31 December 2022 ‡ National team caps and goals as of 1 Jan 2012

Xu Yang (Chinese: 徐洋; born 18 June 1987) is a Chinese former professional footballer who played as a left midfielder or left-back.

== Club career ==
Xu Yang graduated from the Shandong Luneng youth team in 2006 after playing for their various youth teams that trained in Serbia and would soon join a third tier Serbian club in FK Beograd for the second part of the 2006-07 season. However his time in the senior team was to prove extremely frustrating after he was unable to immediately break into the squad. Shandong Luneng were willing to let Xu Yang transfer to Henan Jianye in 2008 where he would make his debut against Changsha Ginde on 7 September 2008 in a 1-0 loss. Xu Yang would nevertheless quickly established himself within the squad and eventually play in 13 league games throughout the 2008 league season. He would go on to establish himself as vital member of the team and was part of the squad that gained the club's highest ever position of third and qualification to the AFC Champions League for the first time at the end of the 2009 Chinese Super League season. At the end of the 2012 Chinese Super League season, Xu would unfortunately be part of the team that was relegated, however he remained loyal to the club and immediately won the division title and promotion back into the Chinese Super League the following season.

On 2 January 2016, Xu transferred to fellow Chinese Super League side Chongqing Lifan. On 28 February 2018, Xu transferred to China League One side Shenzhen FC. He would go on to make his debut in a league game on 11 March 2018 against Heilongjiang Lava Spring that ended in a 2-2 draw. He would go on to establish himself as a regular within the team and go on to gain promotion with the club at the end of the 2018 China League One campaign.

Xu would go back to the second tier and joined Zibo Cuju on 7 April 2021. After only half a season he would join another second tier club in Heilongjiang Ice City on 29 July 2021 On 28 April 2022 he would join second tier football club Shaanxi Chang'an Athletic on a free transfer. After only a handful of games he would leave Shaanxi to transfer to another second tier club in Qingdao Hainiu F.C. on 1 August 2022. He would go on to establish himself as regular within the team that gained promotion to the top tier at the end of the 2022 China League One campaign.

On 10 September 2024, Chinese Football Association announced that Xu was banned from football-related activities for five years, from 10 September 2024 to 9 September 2029, for involving in match-fixing.

On 29 January 2026, Xu was given a lifetime ban for match-fixing by the Chinese Football Association.

== International career ==
Xu Yang would be called-up to the Chinese national football by the Chinese Head coach Gao Hongbo. He would make his debut against Iran in a friendly, which China won 1-0 on 1 June 2009, where Xu Yang played as a left winger throughout the game.

== Career statistics ==
Statistics accurate as of match played 31 December 2022.

Appearances and goals by club, season and competition
Club	Season	League			National Cup		Continental		Other		Total	
Club	Season	Division	Apps	Goals	Apps	Goals	Apps	Goals	Apps	Goals	Apps	Goals
Shandong Luneng	2006	Chinese Super League	0	0	0	0	-		-		0	0
FK Beograd	2006-07	Serbian League Belgrade	0	0	0	0	-		-		0	0
Shandong Luneng	2007	Chinese Super League	0	0	-		0	0	-		0	0
Henan Jianye	2008	Chinese Super League	13	0	-		-		-		13	0
Henan Jianye	2009	Chinese Super League	29	3	-		-		-		29	3
Henan Jianye	2010	Chinese Super League	29	4	-		6	0	-		35	4
Henan Jianye	2011	Chinese Super League	30	6	3	0	-		-		33	6
Henan Jianye	2012	Chinese Super League	30	3	0	0	-		-		30	3
Henan Jianye	2013	China League One	30	6	0	0	-		-		30	6
Henan Jianye	2014	Chinese Super League	24	2	2	0	-		-		26	2
Henan Jianye	2015	Chinese Super League	17	0	2	1	-		-		19	1
Henan Jianye	Total		202	24	7	1	6	0	0	0	215	25
Chongqing Lifan	2016	Chinese Super League	30	1	0	0	-		-		30	1
Chongqing Lifan	2017	Chinese Super League	19	0	0	0	-		-		19	0
Chongqing Lifan	Total		49	1	0	0	0	0	0	0	49	1
Shenzhen FC	2018	China League One	24	1	0	0	-		-		24	1
Shenzhen FC	2019	Chinese Super League	5	0	1	0	-		-		5	0
Shenzhen FC	2020	Chinese Super League	6	1	1	0	-		-		7	1
Shenzhen FC	Total		35	2	2	0	0	0	0	0	37	2
Zibo Cuju	2021	China League One	13	1	0	0	-		-		13	1
Heilongjiang Ice City	2021	China League One	18	0	0	0	-		-		18	0
Shaanxi Chang'an Athletic	2022	China League One	4	0	0	0	-		-		4	0
Qingdao Hainiu F.C.	2022	China League One	18	3	0	0	-		-		18	3
Career total			339	31	9	1	6	0	0	0	354	32

== Honours ==
=== Club ===
Henan Jianye

- Chinese League One: 2013

=== Individual ===
- China League One Most Valuable Player: 2013
