= Élton (footballer, born 1988) =

Brazilian footballer

Personal information
- Full name: Elton Martins da Cruz
- Date of birth: 4 November 1988 (age 38)
- Place of birth: Belo Horizonte, Brazil
- Height: 1.71 m (5 ft 7 in)
- Position: Midfielder

Team information
- Current team: East Riffa

Youth career
- América Mineiro
- Atlético Mineiro

Senior career*
Years	Team	Apps	(Gls)
2007–2010	Corinthians		
2008	→ Profute (loan)		
2009	→ Teleoptik (loan)	8	(2)
2009	→ Taubaté (loan)		
2010–2011	Antequera	22	(8)
2011–2012	Puertollano	34	(4)
2012–2013	Espanyol B	16	(3)
2013–2014	Zakho FC		
2014	Independiente Medellín	16	(1)
2015	Patriotas	10	(0)
2015–2016	Mérida	23	(2)
2017	Batatais	19	(6)
2017	Londrina	4	(0)
2017	→ Cuiabá (loan)	4	(0)
2018	Concórdia	10	(4)
2018	Juventus-SP	0	(0)
2019	Rio Claro	16	(6)
2019–	East Riffa		
- * Club domestic league appearances and goals as of 14:41, 24 November 2020 (UTC)

Élton Martins da Cruz (born 4 November 1988), or simply Élton, is a Brazilian professional footballer who plays as a midfielder for East Riffa Club.

== Career ==
Born in Belo Horizonte, Minas Gerais, Élton played in the youth teams of América (MG) and Atlético Mineiro before joining Corinthians in 2007. While with Corinthians, he would spend most of the time on loan. He was loaned to Profute, before making his first move abroad, to Serbia, as he was loaned on 5 February 2009, to FK Teleoptik. He made 8 appearances and scored 2 goals during the second half of the 2008–09 Serbian League Belgrade season. Playing along compatriots Washington Santana da Silva, Alex dos Santos Gonçalves and Jefferson Madeira, they helped Teleoptik to finish 2nd in the 2008–09 Serbian League Belgrade, one of Serbian 3rd tiers, thus earning promotion to the 2009–10 Serbian First League.

After playing in Serbian second level, he returned to Brazil, however he would be loaned again, this time to Taubaté where he will play in the Série B of the Campeonato Paulista until the end of 2009.

In 2010, he left Corinthians and moved to Spain, where after playing one season with Antequera CF and another with CD Puertollano, he joined in summer 2012 RCD Espanyol B. Next he spent a season playing in Iraq with Zakho FC.

In early summer, 2014, he started practicing with Independiente Medellín of Colombian Liga Postobón, and the Managerof the club, Hernán Torres, said he was impressed with his skills. He would be the 6th new player for the club for the Liga Postobón 2014-II season starting in late summer, 2014.

== External sources ==
- Élton at Soccerway
