= Alex (footballer, born 20 May 1990) =

Brazilian footballer

Personal information
- Full name: Alex dos Santos Gonçalves
- Date of birth: 20 May 1990 (age 36)
- Place of birth: Porto Alegre, Brazil
- Height: 1.82 m (6 ft 0 in)
- Position: Forward

Team information
- Current team: Monsoon

Youth career
- 2007–2008: Grêmio

Senior career*
Years	Team	Apps	(Gls)
2008–2010	Teleoptik	33	(13)
2010–2012	Fluminense	0	(0)
2011	→ Internacional (loan)	5	(0)
2012	→ Concordia Chiajna (loan)	15	(4)
2012	→ Universitatea Cluj (loan)	18	(1)
2013–2017	Tombense	13	(3)
2013	→ América-RN (loan)	7	(1)
2013–2014	→ Pandurii Târgu Jiu (loan)	23	(11)
2014–2015	→ Moreirense (loan)	26	(1)
2015	→ Yeni Malatyaspor (loan)	16	(1)
2016	→ Capivariano (loan)	8	(1)
2017	→ Botafogo-SP (loan)	7	(0)
2018	Água Santa	14	(6)
2018	Botafogo-PB	5	(0)
2019	Sertãozinho	13	(1)
2019	Persela Lamongan	29	(17)
2020–2021	Persikabo 1973	3	(1)
2021	Melaka United	10	(3)
2021	Persita Tangerang	5	(1)
2022	Veranópolis	0	(0)
2022	Monsoon	0	(0)
Total		250	(65)
- * Club domestic league appearances and goals as of 26 May 2022

Alex dos Santos Gonçalves (born 20 May 1990) is a Brazilian professional footballer who plays as a forward for Monsoon.

== Career ==
Born in Porto Alegre, Alex played in the youth categories of Grêmio, before moving abroad to Serbian club Teleoptik in August 2008, which is the satellite club of Serbian giants FK Partizan. Alex spent two seasons with Teleoptik, the first one along three more countryman, Washington Santana da Silva, Jefferson Madeira and Elton Martins, helping Teleoptik to finish 2nd in the 2008–09 Serbian League Belgrade, one of Serbian third tiers, thus earning promotion to the 2009–10 Serbian First League. Next season they did well and finished sixth in second tier. Next, he returned to his homeland and signed a short-term contract with Fluminense in August 2010. Later on, Alex renewed his contract with Fluminense until the end of the 2012 season. He was subsequently loaned out to Internacional, making his Série A debut. In January 2012, Alex moved to Europe for the second time, being sent on loan to Romanian club Concordia Chiajna. He was loaned to fellow Romanian side Universitatea Cluj in July 2012.

In February 2013, after his contract with Fluminense expired, Alex signed with Tombense. He briefly played on loan at América de Natal, making his Série B debut, before transferring to Romania for the third time, on a season-long loan to Pandurii Târgu Jiu in August 2013. In June 2014, Alex moved to Portugal and joined Primeira Liga newcomers Moreirense on another season-long loan. He was subsequently loaned to Turkish side Yeni Malatyaspor in July 2015. Six months later, his loan was terminated and Alex returned to Tombense, making his Série C debut.

== Career statistics ==
As of 27 September 2018

Appearances and goals by club, season and competition
Club	Season	League		State League		National cup		League cup		Continental		Total	
Club	Season	Apps	Goals	Apps	Goals	Apps	Goals	Apps	Goals	Apps	Goals	Apps	Goals
Internacional (loan)	2011	5	0	3	0	0	0	—		0	0	8	0
Concordia Chiajna (loan)	2011–12	15	4	—		0	0	—		—		15	4
Universitatea Cluj (loan)	2012–13	18	1	—		0	0	—		—		18	1
América-RN (loan)	2013	7	1	0	0	0	0	—		—		7	1
Pandurii Târgu Jiu (loan)	2013–14	23	11	—		2	1	—		5	0	30	12
Moreirense (loan)	2014–15	26	1	—		2	0	3	0	—		31	1
Yeni Malatyaspor (loan)	2015–16	16	1	—		1	0	—		—		17	1
Tombense	2016	13	3	0	0	0	0	—		—		13	3
Tombense	2017	0	0	9	1	0	0	—		—		9	1
Tombense	Total	13	3	9	1	0	0	—		0	0	22	4
Botafogo-SP (loan)	2017	7	0	0	0	0	0	—		—		7	0
Botafogo-PB	2018	5	0	0	0	0	0	—		—		5	0
Career total		135	22	12	1	5	1	3	0	5	0	160	24
