= FK Zvezdara =

Serbian football club

Zvezdara
- Full name: Fudbalski Klub Zvezdara
- Nickname: Bulke (The Poppies)
- Founded: 1951; 75 years ago 2002; 24 years ago (refounded)
- Ground: Stadion FK Zvezdara, Belgrade
- Capacity: 1,000
- President: Željko Popović
- Head coach: Dragan Radojević
- League: Serbian League Belgrade
- 2024–25: Serbian League Belgrade, 7th of 14
- Website: www.fkzvezdara.com
Home colours	Away colours

FK Zvezdara (Serbian Cyrillic: ФК Звездара) is a football club based in Zvezdara, Belgrade, Serbia. They compete in the Serbian League Belgrade, the third tier of the national league system.

== History ==
The club was founded on 10 March 1951 as FK Bulbulderac. They spent the following decade competing in the local leagues of Belgrade. In 1960, the club changed its name to BSK and continued playing in the lower leagues for another decade. They would change their name to OFK Zvezdara in 1974.

After the breakup of Yugoslavia, the club started to climb up the national league pyramid, gaining promotion to the third tier in 1993. They spent the next two seasons in the Serbian League North (1993–94 and 1994–95), placing second and third respectively. Following the assassination of its president Miodrag Nikšić in July 1995, the club finished runners-up in the newly formed Serbian League Belgrade in the 1995–96 season and earned promotion to the Second League of FR Yugoslavia.

The club played in the Second League for five seasons between 1996 and 2001, narrowly missing promotion on two occasions (1997–98 and 1998–99). They eventually won first place in Group East in the 2000–01 season and took promotion to the First League for the first time in history. However, after the murder of its president Branislav Trojanović in July 2001, the club went through an ownership crisis. As a result, they were promptly relegated from the top flight, finishing 16th out of 18 in their debut appearance. The club eventually merged with Srem, which continued to compete in the 2002–03 Second League of Serbia and Montenegro.

Shortly after the club's folding, a group of supporters created a new club called FK Bulbulderac, continuing the tradition of the former club. They gained promotion to the Belgrade First League in 2007 and later to the Belgrade Zone League in 2010. On 12 July 2013, the club changed its name to FK Zvezdara. After spending eight seasons in the fourth tier, they earned promotion to the Serbian League Belgrade in 2018.

== Honours ==
Second League of FR Yugoslavia (Tier 2)

- 2000–01 (Group East)

== Seasons ==
Season	League									Cup
Season	Division	Pld	W	D	L	GF	GA	Pts	Pos	Cup
FR Yugoslavia
1992–93	4 – Belgrade	30	17	9	4	53	27	43	3rd	—
1993–94	3 – North	34	17	13	4	54	20	47	2nd	—
1994–95	3 – North	34	21	10	3	73	22	73	3rd	—
1995–96	3 – Belgrade	34	23	6	5	63	22	75	2nd	—
1996–97	2 – East	34	14	7	13	47	33	49	6th	—
1997–98	2 – East	34	20	5	9	57	27	65	2nd	—
1998–99	2 – East	21 (Note: The season was cut short due to the NATO bombing of Yugoslavia.)	13	3	5	47	18	42	3rd	—
1999–2000	2 – North	34	19	4	11	54	37	61	4th	—
2000–01	2 – East	34	29	3	2	97	20	90	1st	—
2001–02	1	34	7	8	19	35	64	29	16th (Note: The club merged with Srem and a new phoenix club was formed.)	—
Serbia
2006–07	6 – Belgrade	32	21	7	4	88	27	70	2nd	—
2007–08	5 – Belgrade	34	13	8	13	50	44	47	10th	—
2008–09	5 – Belgrade	34	16	7	11	51	33	55	5th	—
2009–10	5 – Belgrade	34	24	6	4	82	34	78	2nd	—
2010–11	4 – Belgrade	34	10	11	13	38	47	41	10th	—
2011–12	4 – Belgrade	34	13	10	11	46	43	49	7th	—
2012–13	4 – Belgrade	32	13	7	12	38	39	46	9th	—
2013–14	4 – Belgrade	30	10	11	9	36	30	41	8th	—
2014–15	4 – Belgrade	28	10	5	13	32	48	35	9th	—
2015–16	4 – Belgrade	28	8	8	12	24	36	32	9th	—
2016–17	4 – Belgrade	30	12	10	8	36	36	46	6th	—
2017–18	4 – Belgrade	30	21	5	4	68	26	68	2nd	—
2018–19	3 – Belgrade	30	12	7	11	36	38	43	8th	—
2019–20	3 – Belgrade	17 (Note: The season was cut short due to the COVID-19 pandemic in Serbia.)	9	2	6	38	26	29	2nd	—
2020–21	3 – Belgrade	38	15	15	8	61	41	60	5th	—
2021–22	3 – Belgrade	30	9	7	14	30	41	34	12th	—
2022–23	3 – Belgrade	30	12	8	10	39	35	44	4th	—
2023–24	3 – Belgrade	30	13	8	9	40	34	47	3rd	—
2024–25	3 – Belgrade	26	11	8	7	47	32	35 (Note: The club was docked six points.)	7th	—

== Notable players ==
This is a list of players who have played at full international level.

- (Montenegro) Mitar Novaković
- (Serbia) Branislav Jovanović
- (Serbia and Montenegro) Ivica Kralj
- (Ukraine) Marko Dević
- (Socialist Federal Republic of Yugoslavia) Ranko Stojić

For a list of all FK Zvezdara players with a Wikipedia article, see Category:FK Zvezdara players.

== Managerial history ==
Period	Name
	(Serbia and Montenegro) Mihailo Ivanović
	(Serbia and Montenegro) Milorad Rajković
	(Serbia and Montenegro) Miloljub Ostojić
	(Serbia and Montenegro) Nikola Bokun
	(Serbia and Montenegro) Nenad Stavrić
2001–2002	(Serbia and Montenegro) Vladeta Tomić
2002	(Serbia and Montenegro) Velimir Đorđević
2002	(Serbia and Montenegro) Stanislav Karasi

Period	Name
	(Serbia) Novak Perović
	(Serbia) Dejan Vojvodić
	(Serbia) Milorad Mrdak
	(Serbia) Nikola Stojković
	(Serbia) Aranđel Todorović
	(Serbia) Nenad Matanović
2017	(Serbia) Milan Martinović

Period	Name
2017	(Serbia) Vujadin Radenković
2017–2020	(Serbia) Igor Savić
2020	(Serbia) Blažo Bulatović
2021	(Serbia) Igor Savić
2021	(Montenegro) Slaven Kovačević
2021–2024	(Serbia) Zdravko Kovačević
2024	(Serbia) Ivan Tasić
2024–	(Serbia) Dragan Radojević
