= Filip Stojanović =

Filip Stojanović may refer to:

- Filip Stojanović (footballer) (born 1988), Serbian football player
- Filip Stojanović (politician) (1944-2026), Serbian politician
