= Jefferson Madeira =

Brazilian footballer

Personal information
- Full name: Jefferson Madeira da Silva
- Date of birth: February 15, 1988 (age 38)
- Place of birth: Duque de Caxias - RJ, Brazil
- Height: 1.75 m (5 ft 9 in)
- Position: Midfielder

Team information
- Current team: Duque de Caxias

Senior career*
Years	Team	Apps	(Gls)
2005–2008	Sport Recife	1	(0)
2008	→ Metropolitano (loan)		
2008	→ Treze (loan)		
2009	FK Teleoptik	1	(0)
2009	Olaria		
2010–	Sport Recife		
- Duque de Caxias
- * Club domestic league appearances and goals

Jefferson Madeira da Silva, or simply Jefferson Madeira (born 15 February 1988) is a Brazilian football forward playing with Duque de Caxias Born in Duque de Caxias, Madeira started his career playing with Sport Recife in 2007 making his debut in the Campeonato Brasileiro Série A.

After loan spells with Metropolitano and Treze during 2008, he joined in January 2009 FK Teleoptik - a club owned by FK Partizan Belgrade - playing in the 2008–09 Serbian League Belgrade playing along compatriots Washington Santana da Silva, Alex dos Santos Gonçalves and Elton Martins, helping Teleoptik to finish 2nd in the 2008–09 Serbian League Belgrade, one of Serbian 3rd tiers, thus earning promotion to the 2009–10 Serbian First League.

In summer 2009 he returned to Brazil and played until the end of the year with Olaria, before returning to Sport Recife.
