= Miloljub Ostojić =

Serbian football manager and player

Personal information
- Date of birth: 1 February 1950 (age 76)
- Place of birth: Gornje Goračiće, PR Serbia, FPR Yugoslavia
- Position: Midfielder

Youth career
- Budućnost Banatski Brestovac

Senior career*
Years	Team	Apps	(Gls)
- Zlatar Nova Varoš
- Dinamo Pančevo
- Radnički Kovin

Managerial career
- Radnički Kovin
- Hajduk Beograd
- Zvezdara
- Palilulac Beograd
- Dinamo Pančevo
- 1996–1997: Obilić
- 1997–1998: Proleter Zrenjanin
- 1998–1999: Obilić
- 1999: Red Star Belgrade
- 2000: Qingdao Hainiu
- 2001: Čukarički
- 2001: Zemun
- 2002–2003: Hajduk Kula
- 2003: Zemun
- 2004: Hajduk Kula
- 2005: Železnik
- 2006–2007: Zemun
- 2007: Bežanija
- 2008–2009: Mladi Radnik
- 2009: Čukarički
- * Club domestic league appearances and goals

Miloljub Ostojić (Serbian Cyrillic: Милољуб Остојић; born 1 February 1950) is a Serbian former football manager and player.

== Playing career ==
Born in Gornje Goračiće, a village near Prijepolje, Ostojić grew up in Banatski Brestovac, a village near Pančevo, starting out at local club Budućnost. He played most of his career with Dinamo Pančevo and retired after playing for Radnički Kovin.

== Managerial career ==
After working in the youth setup at Dinamo Pančevo, Ostojić began his managerial career with Radnički Kovin in the Banat League, the fifth tier of Yugoslav football. He was responsible for the emergence of Darko Kovačević. On the recommendation of his former teammate Miroslav Vjetrović, Ostojić subsequently took charge of Belgrade Zone League side Hajduk Beograd, helping them win promotion. He later served two terms as manager of Obilić under the ownership of Arkan during the late 1990s.

In June 1999, Ostojić was appointed as manager of Red Star Belgrade. He resigned from the position after spending less than three months in charge following a poor start to the season. In December 1999, Ostojić was announced as new manager of Chinese Jia-A League club Qingdao Hainiu for the 2000 season. He departed China in July 2000.

After returning to his homeland, Ostojić managed numerous clubs in the top flight during the 2000s, including Čukarički (twice), Zemun (three spells), Hajduk Kula (twice), Železnik, and Bežanija.
