= Washington (footballer, born 1989) =

Brazilian footballer

Personal information
- Full name: Washintinho Santana da Silva
- Date of birth: 20 January 1989 (age 37)
- Place of birth: São Paulo, Brazil
- Height: 1.79 m (5 ft 10 in)
- Position: Midfielder

Team information
- Current team: São João de Ver
- Number: 33

Senior career*
Years	Team	Apps	(Gls)
2005–2008	Força	0	(0)
2006	→ Figueirense (loan)	0	(0)
2008–2009	Teleoptik	24	(23)
2010	Botafogo (SP)	2	(0)
2010–2011	Tombense	0	(0)
2011	→ Figueirense (loan)	4	(1)
2012	Cianorte	0	(0)
2013	CRAC	18	(0)
2014–2015	Penapolense	0	(0)
2014	→ Joinville (loan)	24	(0)
2014	→ Palmeiras (loan)	5	(0)
2014	→ Paraná (loan)	13	(1)
2015–2017	Nacional	62	(0)
2017–2018	Desportivo Aves	7	(0)
2018	Panionios	6	(0)
2018	Vila Nova	8	(0)
2019	Atlético Goianiense	18	(0)
2019	Ponte Preta	17	(0)
2020	CRB	20	(0)
2020–2025	Feirense	105	(5)
2025–	São João de Ver	20	(0)
- * Club domestic league appearances and goals as of 7 May 2026

Washington Santana da Silva (born 20 January 1989) is a Brazilian professional footballer who plays for Portuguese Liga 3 club São João de Ver as a midfielder.

== Career ==
Washington started his career in São Paulo, for a small club Força. He was loaned to Figueirense in June 2006 but released in October. In August 2008 he left for Serbian club Teleoptik which is the satellite club of Serbian giants FK Partizan and where, playing along compatriots Alex dos Santos Gonçalves, Elton Martins and Jefferson Madeira, in the 2008–09 Serbian League Belgrade, Serbian third tier, have helped the club to finish second thus achieving promotion to Serbian second tier, the Serbian First League.

After playing with Teleoptik the first half of the 2009–10 Serbian First League, in December 2009 he returned to Brazil for Botafogo de Ribeirão Preto, until the end of 2010 Campeonato Paulista. He contract was extended until May 2011. After played in 2010 Campeonato Brasileiro Série D, he left for Tombense in September but immediately loaned to Campeonato Brasileiro Série A club Figueirense.

He scored his first goal on 16 January 2011 as a forward, in 2011 Campeonato Catarinense.

In 2012, he joined Cianorte Futebol Clube playing in the Campeonato Paranaense.

On 25 April 2015, Washington Santana joined Paraná.

On 27 January 2018, Panionios F.C. officially announced the signing of defensive midfielder Washington Santana Silva, who was recently released from Clube Desportivo das Aves for an undisclosed fee. He will replace Frenchman Kevin Tapoko in the squad of experienced manager Michalis Grigoriou's team.

Washington returned to Brasil in August 2018, signing for Vila Nova, before moving across the state to Atlético Goianiense in December 2018, for the 2019 season.

== Honours ==
- Campeonato Paulista do Interior: 2010

== External sources ==
- Washington at Soccerway
