= Filip Stojanović (footballer) =

Serbian footballer

Personal information
- Date of birth: 19 May 1988 (age 38)
- Place of birth: Belgrade, SFR Yugoslavia
- Height: 1.77 m (5 ft 10 in)
- Position: Midfielder

Senior career*
Years	Team	Apps	(Gls)
2006–2008	Obilić	55	(7)
2008–2009	Gloria Buzău	0	(0)
2010–2011	BASK	46	(9)
2011–2012	Novi Pazar	30	(1)
2013	Voždovac	14	(0)
2013	Donji Srem	10	(0)
2014	Naxxar Lions	13	(1)
2014–2016	Radnik Surdulica	59	(5)
2016	Trikala	4	(0)
2017–2018	Radnik Bijeljina	33	(5)
2018–2019	Radnik Surdulica	30	(2)
2019–2020	Mladost Lučani	14	(0)
2020–2021	Kolubara	31	(2)
2021	Budućnost Dobanovci	18	(0)
- * Club domestic league appearances and goals as of 2 October 2022

Filip Stojanović (Serbian Cyrillic: Филип Стојановић; born 19 May 1988) is a Serbian professional footballer who plays as a midfielder.

== Career ==
Born in Belgrade, Stojanović started out at Obilić, making his senior debut in the 2006–07 season. He was later acquired by Romanian club Gloria Buzău, but failed to make any appearances. In 2010, Stojanović joined BASK and helped them win the Serbian League Belgrade (2009–10) and subsequently the Serbian First League (2010–11). However, the club ceded its Serbian SuperLiga spot to Novi Pazar and numerous players headed in the same direction, including Stojanović. He also played for Voždovac and Donji Srem, before moving to Maltese Premier League side Naxxar Lions in early 2014.

In the summer of 2014, Stojanović signed with Radnik Surdulica and helped them win promotion to the Serbian SuperLiga for the first time in history. He later played for Trikala (Greece) and Radnik Bijeljina (Bosnia and Herzegovina), before returning to Radnik Surdulica in June 2018. In July 2019, Stojanović signed with Mladost Lučani.

== Honours ==
BASK

- Serbian First League: 2010–11
- Serbian League Belgrade: 2009–10

Radnik Surdulica

- Serbian First League: 2014–15
