= Slaven Kovačević (footballer) =

Montenegrin footballer and manager

Personal information
- Full name: Slaven Kovačević
- Date of birth: 17 June 1980 (age 46)
- Place of birth: Titograd, SFR Yugoslavia
- Height: 1.84 m (6 ft 1/2 in)
- Position: Midfielder

Senior career*
Years	Team	Apps	(Gls)
2000–2003	Budućnost Podgorica		
2003–2004	Radnički Beograd	19	(1)
2004	→ Železničar Beograd (loan)	1	(0)
2005–2007	Zemun	28	(0)
2007	Čukarički	7	(1)
2007–2008	Mladenovac	10	(0)
2008	→ Voždovac (loan)	4	(1)
2008	Bežanija	3	(0)
2009	Petrovac	14	(2)
2009–2010	Željezničar Sarajevo	6	(0)
2011	Palilulac Beograd		

Managerial career
- 2017–2019: Lokomotiva Železnik
- 2019: Radnički Obrenovac
- 2020: BSK Borča
- * Club domestic league appearances and goals

Slaven Kovačević (Cyrillic: Славен Ковачевић; born 17 June 1980) is a Montenegrin football manager and former player.

== Playing career ==
He played as midfielder with FK Željezničar Sarajevo in the Premier League of Bosnia and Herzegovina. Earlier he played with FK Zemun in the Serbian SuperLiga.

== Managerial career ==
He finished his playing career at FK Palilulac Beograd in Serbian League Belgrade and, afterwards, became coach. He started his coaching career in 2017 taking charge of FK Lokomotiva Železnik, and, later he also coached FK Radnički Obrenovac and FK BSK Borča.
