= Goran Nikić =

Yugoslav footballer

Personal information
- Full name: Goran Nikić
- Date of birth: 19 August 1968 (age 58)
- Place of birth: Belgrade, SFR Yugoslavia
- Height: 1.76 m (5 ft 9 in)
- Position: Right midfielder

Youth career
- Železnik
- 1981–1986: Red Star Belgrade

Senior career*
Years	Team	Apps	(Gls)
1986–1987	Red Star Belgrade	4	
- Rad
- Čukarički
- Sinđelić
	Perugia	27	(4)
–2000	Valletta FC		

International career
1984–1987	Yugoslavia U21	11	(3)

Managerial career
- 2000-2003: Železnik U-19
- 2004-2005: Kolubara
- 2006-2007: Sopot
- 2007: Budućnost Valjevo
- 2008: Dorćol
- 2010-2011: Jedinstvo Paraćin
- 2011-2014: Red Star Belgrade U-18
- 2014-2017: Revs Academy
- 2019: Jedinstvo Surčin
- 2019-2020: Dunav Stari Banovci
- 2020: Senglea Athletic
- 2021-2022: Voždovac U-18
- 2023-2024: ŽFK Red Star Belgrade
- 2024: ŽNK Osijek
- 2024: GSP Polet Dorćol
Medal record
Gold medal – first place	Fifa World Youth Championship	1987
- * Club domestic league appearances and goals

Goran Nikić (Serbian Cyrillic: Горан Никић; born 1969) is a Serbian former professional footballer who played as a midfielder.

At international level, Nikić represented FR Yugoslavia U-21 in one U-21 Euro and was on the preliminary squad for the 1987 FIFA World Youth Championship winning team.

== Club career ==
Born in Belgrade, Nikić made his senior debut with Red Star Belgrade. After suffering a hamstring injury, he left for various clubs before eventually retiring in 2000.

== International career ==
Nikić represented Yugoslavia at the U-21 level in the 1986 European Championship. He was also in the preliminary squad for the 1987 Youth World Cup in Chile, but was sidelined due to an injury and could not play. The team eventually won the World Cup.

== Post-playing career ==
Nikić coached Kolubara, Sopot, Budućnost, Dinamo and Jedinstvo, and then he got his chance to return to Red Star as a coach in the youth academy. He was named coach of Maltese side Senglea Athletic in summer 2020.

== Personal life ==
Nikić's daughter is a Serbian handball player.
