= FK Brodarac 1947 =

Serbian football club

Brodarac 1947
- Full name: Fudbalski Klub Brodarac 1947
- Nickname: Brodari (The Bargemen)
- Founded: 2014
- Dissolved: 2017
- Ground: Stadion FK Brodarac, New Belgrade
- Capacity: 500
- 2016–17: Serbian League Belgrade, 6th of 16
Home colours	Away colours

FK Brodarac 1947 (Serbian Cyrillic: ФК Бродарац 1947) is a defunct football club based in New Belgrade, Serbia. They were closely affiliated with FK Brodarac.

== History ==
Founded in 2014, the club replaced Šumadija Jagnjilo in the Serbian League Belgrade. They spent the next three seasons in the third tier, placing sixth, third, and sixth, respectively. The club eventually stopped competing after the 2016–17 season.

== Seasons ==
Season	League									Cup
Season	Division	Pld	W	D	L	GF	GA	Pts	Pos	Cup
2014–15	3 – Belgrade	30	13	5	12	40	43	44	6th	—
2015–16	3 – Belgrade	30	16	8	6	49	30	56	3rd	—
2016–17	3 – Belgrade	30	13	5	12	47	42	44	6th	—

== Managerial history ==
Period	Name
	(Serbia) Miroslav Čermelj
	(Serbia) Dragan Perišić
