= Dragan Perišić =

Serbian football manager and player

Personal information
- Full name: Dragan Perišić
- Date of birth: 27 October 1979 (age 47)
- Place of birth: Belgrade, SFR Yugoslavia
- Height: 1.89 m (6 ft 2 in)
- Position: Defender

Senior career*
Years	Team	Apps	(Gls)
1999–2004	Železnik	8	(1)
2002	→ Balkan Mirijevo (loan)	15	(0)
2002	→ Dorćol (loan)	13	(0)
2003	→ Rudar Pljevlja (loan)	16	(0)
2004–2005	Jablonec	2	(0)
2005–2006	Pandurii Târgu Jiu	20	(0)
2006–2009	Metalurh Zaporizhzhia	33	(3)
2010	Simurq	4	(1)
2010–2011	Sheikh Jamal		
2011	Birkirkara	7	(0)
2012	Zemun	13	(0)
Total		131	(5)

Managerial career
- Brodarac 1947
- Jedinstvo Stara Pazova
- 2020–2021: Sinđelić Beograd
- 2021: Radnički Pirot
- 2021: Radnički Sremska Mitrovica
- 2022: Železničar Pančevo
- 2022: Radnik Surdulica
- 2023: Napredak Kruševac
- 2024: Mladost Novi Sad
- * Club domestic league appearances and goals

Dragan Perišić (Serbian Cyrillic: Драган Перишић; born 27 October 1979) is a Serbian football manager and former player.

== Playing career ==
Born in Belgrade, Perišić was a member of Železnik for several years, but never managed to establish himself as a first-team regular. He instead went out on loan to several domestic clubs, before moving abroad in 2004. Over the next eight years, Perišić played in the Czech Republic (Jablonec), Romania (Pandurii Târgu Jiu), Ukraine (Metalurh Zaporizhzhia), Azerbaijan (Simurq), Bangladesh (Sheikh Jamal), and Malta (Birkirkara). He returned to his homeland and joined Zemun in the 2012 winter transfer window.

== Managerial career ==
After hanging up his boots, Perišić served as manager of Brodarac 1947, Jedinstvo Stara Pazova, Sinđelić Beograd (September 2020–April 2021), Radnički Pirot, and Radnički Sremska Mitrovica.
