= Miroslav Vjetrović =

Serbian footballer and sports journalist

Personal information
- Full name: Miroslav Vjetrović
- Date of birth: 21 July 1956 (age 70)
- Place of birth: Belgrade, FPR Yugoslavia
- Height: 1.82 m (6 ft 0 in)
- Position: Defender

Senior career*
Years	Team	Apps	(Gls)
- Palilulac Beograd
- Dinamo Pančevo
1980–1981	FAP		
1981–1982	Jedinstvo Ub		
1982–1984	Obilić		
1984–1986	Hannover 96	42	(5)
- * Club domestic league appearances and goals

Miroslav Vjetrović (Serbian Cyrillic: Мирослав Вјетровић; born 21 July 1956) is a Serbian former footballer who played as a defender.

== Career ==
Vjetrović played in the lower leagues of Yugoslavia, before moving abroad to Germany at the age of 28. He spent two seasons with Hannover 96 between 1984 and 1986, helping them win promotion to the Bundesliga.

After a career-ending leg injury, Vjetrović worked as a sports journalist for over a decade, reporting for German sports magazine Kicker, among others.
