= 2018–19 Serbian League Belgrade =

Serbian League Belgrade
- Season: 2018–19

The Serbian League Belgrade (Serbian: Srpska liga Beograd) is one of four sections of the Serbian League, the third national tier. The league is operated by the Belgrade FA. 16 teams compete in the league for the 2018–19 season. The top-seeded team will be promoted to the Serbian SuperLiga. The two bottom-seeded teams will be relegated to the Belgrade Zone League, the fourth-highest division overall in the Serbian football league system, while the team in 14th position will be participating in a relegation playoff match against the 3rd placed team from the Belgrade Zone League.

== Team changes ==
The following teams have changed division since the 2017–18 season.

=== To Serbian League Belgrade ===
Promoted from Belgrade Zone League

- Brodarac
- Zvezdara

Relegated from Serbian First League

- None

=== From First League ===
Relegated to Belgrade Zone League

- Sopot
- BSK Batajnica

Promoted to Serbian First League

- Žarkovo

== 2018–19 teams ==
Club	Town
FK BASK	Čukarica, Belgrade
FK Brodarac	New Belgrade, Belgrade
FK BSK Borča	Borča, Belgrade
RFK Grafičar Beograd	Belgrade
FK GSP Polet Dorćol	Dorćol, Belgrade
FK Zvezdara	Zvezdara, Belgrade
FK IMT	New Belgrade, Belgrade
FK Jedinstvo Surčin	Surčin, Belgrade
FK Kolubara	Lazarevac
FK Lokomotiva Beograd	Belgrade
OFK Beograd	Belgrade
FK Prva iskra Barič	Barič, Obrenovac
FK Radnički Beograd	New Belgrade, Belgrade
FK Radnički Obrenovac	Obrenovac
FK Stepojevac Vaga	Stepojevac, Lazarevac
FK Crvena zvezda Mali Mokri Lug	Mali Mokri Lug, Belgrade

== League table ==
Pos	Team	Pld	W	D	L	GF	GA	GD	Pts	Promotion or relegation
1	Grafičar Beograd	30	23	6	1	80	23	+57	75	Promotion to the Serbian First League
2	IMT	30	22	4	4	65	22	+43	70	
3	Kolubara	30	20	5	5	69	33	+36	65	
4	Radnički Beograd	30	13	8	9	44	30	+14	47	
5	OFK Beograd	30	14	4	12	55	35	+20	46	
6	Radnički Obrenovac	30	11	11	8	33	31	+2	44	
7	Brodarac	30	12	7	11	48	41	+7	43	
8	Zvezdara	30	12	7	11	36	38	−2	43	
9	Jedinstvo Surčin	30	12	5	13	51	52	−1	41	
10	GSP Polet Dorćol	30	9	11	10	47	41	+6	38	
11	BSK Borča	30	12	2	16	54	67	−13	38	
12	Crvena Zvezda MML	30	10	7	13	40	51	−11	37	
13	Lokomotiva Beograd	30	9	6	15	39	46	−7	33	
14	Stepojevac Vaga	30	4	8	18	28	82	−54	20	Qualification for the relegation play-offs
15	Prva Iskra	30	4	4	22	26	64	−38	16	Relegation to the Belgrade Zone League
16	BASK	30	4	3	23	25	84	−59	15	Relegation to the Belgrade Zone League
