= Zdravko Kovačević =

Serbian footballer

Personal information
- Full name: Zdravko Kovačević
- Date of birth: 6 August 1984 (age 42)
- Place of birth: Janošik, SFR Yugoslavia
- Height: 1.80 m (5 ft 11 in)
- Position: Defender

Team information
- Current team: Radnički Obrenovac (manager)

Senior career*
Years	Team	Apps	(Gls)
2006–2007	Banat Zrenjanin		
2007–2010	Hajduk Beograd	43	(2)
2010–2011	Zbrojovka Brno	1	(0)
2011–2012	Hajduk Beograd		
2013	Radnički Nova Pazova	3	(0)
2013	OFK Beograd	1	(0)
2014	Ararat	9	(0)
2015–2018	Dunav		

Managerial career
- 2021-2024: Zvezdara
- 2024-: Radnički Obrenovac
- * Club domestic league appearances and goals as of 9 November 2015

Zdravko Kovačević (Serbian Cyrillic: Здравко Ковачевић; born 6 August 1984) is a Serbian retired football defender.

== Career ==
In his career, he played for Serbian football clubs Banat Zrenjanin, Hajduk Beograd and Radnički Nova Pazova, and he had 1 appearance for Zbrojovka Brno in Czech Gambrinus Liga.

== Statistics ==
Club	Season	League		Cup		Europe		Other		Total	
Club	Season	Apps	Goals	Apps	Goals	Apps	Goals	Apps	Goals	Apps	Goals
Hajduk Beograd	2007–08	22	2	0	0	0	0	0	0	22	2
Hajduk Beograd	2008–09	21	0	0	0	0	0	0	0	21	0
Hajduk Beograd	Total	43	0	0	0	0	0	0	0	43	0
Zbrojovka Brno	2010–11	1	0	0	0	0	0	0	0	1	0
Zbrojovka Brno	Total	1	0	0	0	0	0	0	0	1	0
Radnički Nova Pazova	2012–13	3	0	0	0	0	0	0	0	3	0
Radnički Nova Pazova	Total	3	0	0	0	0	0	0	0	3	0
OFK Beograd	2013–14	1	0	0	0	0	0	0	0	1	0
OFK Beograd	Total	1	0	0	0	0	0	0	0	1	0
Career total		48	2	0	0	0	0	0	0	48	2
