= Branko Bulatović =

Football official in Montenegro, who died by assassination

- Born: Branko Bulatović; 10 December 1951; Kolašin, PR Montenegro, FPR Yugoslavia
- Died: 26 March 2004 (aged 52); Belgrade, Serbia and Montenegro
- Children: Blažo Bulatović (son)

Branko "Bato" Bulatović (Serbian Cyrillic: Бранко Булатовић; 10 December 1951 – 26 March 2004) was a Montenegrin football administrator. He was the general secretary of the Football Association of Serbia and Montenegro at the time of his assassination in 2004.

== Death ==
On 26 March 2004, an unknown assailant walked up to Bulatović and shot him twice in the back of the head in the lobby of the Football Association of Serbia and Montenegro headquarters. Bulatović was rushed to the Military Medical Academy where he went into a coma. He later succumbed to his injuries.

== Personal life ==
He had two children: a daughter and a son named Blažo who was a footballer.
