= Milan Martinović =

Serbian footballer

Milan Martinović Милан Мартиновић
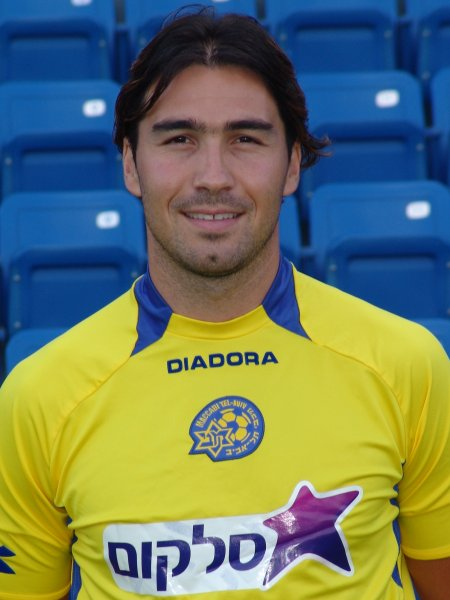
- Martinović with Maccabi Tel Aviv

Personal information
- Full name: Milan Martinović
- Date of birth: 6 August 1979 (age 47)
- Place of birth: Belgrade, SR Serbia, SFR Yugoslavia
- Height: 1.81 m (5 ft 11 in)
- Position: Centre-back

Youth career
- Rad

Senior career*
Years	Team	Apps	(Gls)
1998–2000	Rad	29	(0)
2000–2002	Oviedo	26	(0)
2001–2002	→ Red Star Belgrade (loan)	16	(0)
2003	Rad	15	(0)
2003–2004	Ajaccio	1	(0)
2005–2006	Rad	24	(0)
2006–2008	Maccabi Tel Aviv	41	(0)
2008–2009	Bnei Yehuda	41	(0)
2010	Diyarbakırspor	8	(0)
2011	Shenyang Dongjin		
Total		201	(0)

International career
1997	FR Yugoslavia U18	4	(1)
2000–2001	FR Yugoslavia U21	6	(0)

Managerial career
- 2017: Zvezdara
- * Club domestic league appearances and goals

Milan Martinović (Serbian Cyrillic: Милан Мартиновић; born 6 August 1979) is a Serbian former professional footballer who played as a defender.

== Club career ==
After a breakthrough season with Rad in 1999–2000, Martinović moved abroad to Spain and joined La Liga side Oviedo in July 2000. He was subsequently loaned out to Red Star Belgrade during the 2001–02 season. Following a short spell at his parent club Rad in 2003, Martinović moved abroad for the second time and signed with French side Ajaccio, but made just one league appearance that season. He later returned again to Rad, before transferring to Maccabi Tel Aviv in the summer of 2006. In January 2008, Martinović switched to fellow Israeli Premier League club Bnei Yehuda. He also played briefly for Diyarbakırspor (Turkey) and Shenyang Dongjin (China).

== International career ==
Internationally, Martinović represented FR Yugoslavia at under-18 and under-21 level.

== Honours ==
Red Star Belgrade

- FR Yugoslavia Cup: 2001–02
