= FK GSP Polet Dorćol =

Serbian football club

GSP Polet Dorćol
- Full name: Fudbalski Klub GSP Polet Dorćol
- Founded: 2017; 9 years ago
- Ground: Stadion FK GSP Polet Dorćol
- Capacity: 1,000
- President: Miodrag Sovtić
- Head coach: vacant
- League: Serbian League Belgrade
- 2024–25: Serbian League Belgrade, 6th of 14
Home colours	Away colours

FK GSP Polet Dorćol (Serbian Cyrillic: ФК ГСП Полет Дорћол) is a Serbian football club based in Dorćol, Belgrade. They compete in the Serbian League Belgrade, the third tier of the national league system.

== History ==
The club was formed in 2017 following a merger between local rivals FK GSP Polet (founded in 1929) and FK Dorćol (founded in 1952) due to financial difficulties. They spent four seasons in the Serbian League Belgrade before suffering relegation to the Belgrade Zone League in 2021. The club returned to the third tier in 2023.

== Seasons ==
Season	League									Cup
Season	Division	Pld	W	D	L	GF	GA	Pts	Pos	Cup
Serbia
2017–18	3 – Belgrade	30	9	9	12	34	38	36	11th	—
2018–19	3 – Belgrade	30	9	11	10	47	41	38	10th	—
2019–20	3 – Belgrade	17 (Note: The season was cut short due to the COVID-19 pandemic in Serbia.)	5	3	9	15	21	18	15th	—
2020–21	3 – Belgrade	38	7	3	28	35	84	24	19th	—
2021–22	4 – Belgrade	30	13	3	14	44	42	42	8th	—
2022–23	4 – Belgrade	30	23	1	6	88	33	70	2nd	—
2023–24	3 – Belgrade	30	11	7	12	33	32	40	10th	—
2024–25	3 – Belgrade	26	10	6	10	35	28	36	6th	—

== Managerial history ==
Period	Name
2017–2020	(Serbia) Mihailo Ivanović
2020	(Serbia) Nebojša Vučićević
2021	(Bosnia and Herzegovina) Cvijetin Blagojević
2021–2023	(Serbia) Mihailo Ivanović
2023–2024	(Serbia) Željko Miković
2024	(Serbia) Zoran Ćetković
2024	(Serbia) Ratko Dostanić
2024	(Serbia) Goran Nikić
