= Goran Lazarevski =

Macedonian footballer

Personal information
- Full name: Goran Lazarevski
- Date of birth: 17 December 1974 (age 51)
- Place of birth: Prilep, SFR Yugoslavia
- Height: 1.81 m (5 ft 11 1/2 in)
- Position: Midfielder

Senior career*
Years	Team	Apps	(Gls)
1997–2000	Pobeda	77	(3)
2000–2001	APOEL	23	(2)
2001–2002	Malatyaspor	17	(1)
2002–2003	Vojvodina	21	(1)
2003–2004	Radnički Obrenovac	6	(0)
2004–2005	AEK Larnaca	3	(0)

International career
1996–2001	Macedonia	25	(0)
- * Club domestic league appearances and goals

Goran Lazarevski (Macedonian: Горан Лазаревски; born 17 December 1974) is a retired Macedonian international football midfielder.

== International career ==
He made his senior debut for Macedonia in a November 1996 friendly match away against Malta and has earned a total of 25 caps, scoring no goals. His final international was an October 2001 FIFA World Cup qualification match against Slovakia.
