= Igor Savić (football manager) =

Serbian football manager

Personal information
- Date of birth: 8 March 1978 (age 48)

Managerial career
- Years: Team
- 2015–2017: Red Star Belgrade (youth)
- 2017: BSK Borča
- 2017–2020: Zvezdara
- 2020: Mladost Lučani (assistant)
- 2020: Smederevo 1924
- 2021: Zvezdara
- 2021: Zvijezda 09
- 2021–2022: Žarkovo
- 2022: OFK Bačka
- 2022: Železničar Pančevo
- 2023: Rad
- 2023: Mladost Lučani
- 2024: Kolubara
- 2024–2025: OFK Vršac

Igor Savić (Serbian Cyrillic: Игор Савић; born 8 March 1978) is a Serbian football manager.

== Managerial career ==
Between 2015 and 2017, Savić worked in the youth setups at Red Star Belgrade. He became manager of Belgrade Zone League club Zvezdara in December 2017 and led them to promotion at the end of the season. In January 2020, Savić joined the coaching staff at Mladost Lučani. He subsequently served as manager of Serbian League West club Smederevo 1924 from July to December 2020.
