= Miloš Veselinović =

Serbian footballer and coach

Personal information
- Date of birth: 12 November 1979 (age 47)
- Place of birth: Obrenovac, SFR Yugoslavia
- Position: Midfielder

Team information
- Current team: Al Ain (assistant)

Youth career
- Red Star Belgrade

Senior career*
Years	Team	Apps	(Gls)
1998–2001	Red Star Belgrade	0	(0)
- → Bor (loan)
- → Loznica (loan)
- → Jedinstvo Ub (loan)

International career
- Yugoslavia U15
- Yugoslavia U17
- Yugoslavia U19

Managerial career
- 2011: Srem
- 2012–2013: Radnički Obrenovac
- 2014–2015: Inđija
- 2015–2016: Radnik Surdulica
- 2016: Javor Ivanjica
- 2016–2017: PAOK (assistant)
- 2018: Voždovac
- 2018–2020: Maccabi Tel Aviv (assistant)
- 2020: Watford (assistant)
- 2022–2023: Maccabi Tel Aviv (assistant)
- 2023–2024: Krasnodar (assistant)
- 2025-: Al Ain (assistant)
- * Club domestic league appearances and goals

Miloš Veselinović (Serbian Cyrillic: Милош Веселиновић; born 12 November 1979) is a Serbian football coach and a former player. He is an assistant to head coach Vladimir Ivić at Al Ain.

== Career ==
After a youth career in Red Star, Veselinović signed a long-term contract with Red Star. Due to his age, Dragan Džajić decided to send talent player on loan to 1. division clubs. After one season in FK Bor and one in FK Loznica, Veselinović went on a loan trip to FK Jedinstvo Ub. Due to his serious knee injury that season, he decided to finish his career.

== Coaching career ==
Radnički Obrenovac

Almost six months after he finished playing, Veselinović started his career as an assistant coach of Under 7 in the youth system at FK Radnički Obrenovac. Between 2002 and 2006 he was a coach for under 7, under 9, under 11, under 13 and under 15 teams. In the 2006–07 season he was promoted to assistant coach in the senior level. At the age of only 26, in the season 2007–08, the board appointed him as main coach, and he stayed in that position until winter 2014. In the season 2011–12 he was at the same time director of football for the youth system and the main coach of the senior team.

All his time in Radnički Obrenovac, club was playing 2. division of Serbia (3rd level), and it was the only non-professional club from Serbia which transferred players to other clubs on serious level of football. Under his mandate as main coach, Radnički Obrenovac transferred around 10 players; the most famous are: Radosav Petrović to Partizan, Filip Đuričić to Heerenveen, and Alen Stevanović to Inter Milan.

Inđija

Veselinović, who holds UEFA Pro Coaching Licences, was appointed as main coach at FK Inđija on 17 January 2014. At that moment FK Inđija was last on the table in Serbian First League with only 11 points, 7 points less from position out of relegation. In the second half of the season, FK Inđija took 26 points from 15 games, and the team had 7 consecutive wins at home in a row.

In season 2014-15 FK Inđija finished 5th on table and affirmed Zakaria Suraka, a young player from Ghana, who was after that season sold to FK Radnik Surdulica. In the second half of season 2014–15, FK Inđija repeated the same consecutive streak of 7 wins at home in a row.

Radnik Surdulica

The first Serbian SuperLiga season in history of club didn't start well for Radnik Surdulica. After only one win in the first 8 games, the board of the club mutually agreed to terminate the contract with Mladen Milinković and appointed young Veselinović as main coach. After his loss on debut against FK Čukarički 0–2, Radnik Surdulica had a consecutive streak of 9 games without losing, including a spectacular return against FK Partizan after losing 0–2 on half-time. After that, Radnik Surdulica continually made good results and after the regular season, the club was promoted to playoff of Serbian SuperLiga as 8th on table.

Maccabi Tel Aviv

On 23 May 2018 Veselinović joined Israeli Premier League club Maccabi Tel Aviv as an assistant of Vladimir Ivić. He left on 1 of August 2020

Watford

On 15 August 2020 Veselinović joined Championship club Watford as an assistant of Vladimir Ivić. His departure was announced on 19 December 2020.

Krasnodar In January 2023, Veselinović again followed Ivić to Russian Premier League club Krasnodar following a second short spell at Maccabi Tel Aviv.
