= FK Jedinstvo Surčin =

Serbian football club

Jedinstvo Surčin
- Full name: Fudbalski Klub Jedinstvo Surčin
- Founded: 1928; 98 years ago
- Ground: Stadion FK Jedinstvo
- Capacity: 780
- President: Vaso Kisić
- Head coach: Zoran Pavlović
- League: Serbian League Belgrade
- 2024–25: Serbian League Belgrade, 8th of 16
Home colours	Away colours

FK Jedinstvo Surčin (Serbian Cyrillic: ФК Јединство Сурчин) is a football club based in Surčin, Belgrade, Serbia. They compete in the Serbian League Belgrade, the third tier of the national league system.

== History ==
In 2002, the club won the Belgrade Zone League and took promotion to the Serbian League Belgrade. They spent four seasons in the third tier, before suffering relegation back to the Belgrade Zone League in 2006. The club was subsequently relegated to the Belgrade First League in 2007 and eventually to the Belgrade Second League in 2008, ending up in the sixth tier of Serbian football.

=== Recent league history ===
Season	Division	P	W	D	L	F	A	Pts	Pos
2020–21	3 - Serbian League Belgrade	38	18	9	11	51	41	63	3rd
2021–22	3 - Serbian League Belgrade	30	11	7	12	39	44	40	9th
2022–23	3 - Serbian League Belgrade	30	10	12	8	21	23	38 (Note: The club was docked four points.)	7th
2023–24	3 - Serbian League Belgrade	30	11	9	10	38	36	40 (Note: The club was docked two points.)	7th
2024–25	3 - Serbian League Belgrade	26	8	7	11	30	43	31	8th

== Honours ==
Belgrade Zone League (Tier 4)

- 2001–02

Belgrade First League (Tier 5)

- 2013–14 (Group A)

Belgrade Second League (Tier 6)

- 2011–12 (Group Danube)

== Notable players ==
This is a list of players who have played at full international level.

- (Bosnia and Herzegovina) Stevo Nikolić
- (Serbia) Branislav Jovanović

For a list of all FK Jedinstvo Surčin players with a Wikipedia article, see Category:FK Jedinstvo Surčin players.

== Historical list of coaches ==
- (Serbia) Zoran Pavlović
- (Serbia) Dušan Đorđević (2017–2018)
- (Bosnia and Herzegovina) Boris Savić (2018)
- (Serbia) Slaviša Božičić (2018)
- (Serbia) Milan Bosanac (2018)
- (Serbia) Goran Nikić (2019)
- (Serbia) Vladan Žikić (2019)
- (Serbia) Zvonko Radić (2019)
- (Serbia) Vladimir Šubert (2019)
- (Serbia) Darko Žakula (2020–2021)
- (Serbia) Blažo Bulatović (2021)
- (Montenegro) Dušan Jevrić (2021)
- (Serbia) Dejan Mitrović (2021-2024)
- (Serbia) Enes Malići (2024)
- (Serbia) Milan Ćulum (2024-)
