= Filip Stojanović (politician) =

Serbian politician (1944–2026)

Filip Stojanović (Serbian Cyrillic: Филип Стојановић; 10 August 1944 – 15 January 2026) was a Serbian politician. He served several terms in the parliaments of Yugoslavia, Serbia and Montenegro, and Serbia as a member of the far-right Serbian Radical Party.

== Early life and private career ==
Stojanović was born in Šilovo, a village near Gnjilane, Kosovo, shortly before the end of the Nazi German occupation of the region in World War II. His family continued to live in Šilovo following the establishment the following year of the Autonomous Region of Kosovo and Metohija as part of the People's Republic of Serbia in the Federal People's Republic of Yugoslavia. In 1953, they moved to Gnjilane. Stojanović trained in association football and attended the University of Belgrade's Faculty of Sports. After serving with the Yugoslav People's Army in Knin and Nova Gorica, he moved to Požarevac and played with FK Mladi Radnik. In 1978, he returned to his home area and became secretary-general of FK FK Crvena zvezda Gnjilane (Red Star Gnjilane). He became the director of Hotel Kristal in Gnjilane in 1989. After the conclusion of the Kosovo War, he moved to Belgrade.

== Political career ==
=== Yugoslavian politician ===
Stojanović met Radical Party leader Vojislav Šešelj at a 1992 rally and subsequently became president of the party's district committee in Kosovo-Pomoravlje. He appeared on the party's electoral list for the Priština division in the late 1992 Yugoslavian parliamentary election and was elected to the Chamber of Citizens when the party won four of ten seats in the region. The Socialist Party of Serbia and its Montenegrin allies won the election, and the Radical Party, which won thirty-four seats out of 138, served in opposition.

In May 1994, Radical deputy Draško Marković was ordered to be expelled from the Chamber of Citizens for disruptive activities. He refused to comply, and several other Radical deputies (including Šešelj and Stojanović) became involved in a scuffle with the building's security forces. The deputies were subsequently stripped of their parliamentary immunity and charged with "preventing an officer from enforcing law and order." In September 1994, Stojanović was found guilty and issued a four-month suspended prison sentence, to be served if he committed any offence in the next two years.

Šešelj, Stojanović, and other Radical deputies were arrested again after holding a banned rally in Gnjilane in June 1995. During the arrest, Stojanović sustained a minor injury from a gunshot wound. Although the charges against him stemming from this incident were later dropped, he was incarcerated under the terms of his suspended sentence and spent two months in the Gnjilane prison in the company of Šešelj and other party leaders.

Stojanović appeared in the first position on the Radical Party's list for the redistributed division of Vranje in the 1996 Yugoslavian parliamentary election and was re-elected when the party won one of the four seats in the district. The Socialist Party and its allies again won the election, and the Radicals, who fell to sixteen seats, initially continued to serve in opposition. The Radicals later joined a coalition government with the Socialists and the Yugoslav Left in Serbia in 1998, and they also became part of the government of Yugoslavia in 1999.

Socialist Party leader Slobodan Milošević was defeated in his bid for re-election as president of Yugoslavia in the 2000 general election, an event that precipitated a large-scale transformation of Serbian and Yugoslavian politics. Stojanović once again received the lead position on the Radical Party's list for Vranje for the concurrent Yugoslavian parliamentary elections and was re-elected when the party won one seat out of nine in the now expanded division. The election was won by the Democratic Opposition of Serbia, and the Radicals, who fell to only five seats in the Chamber of Citizens, returned to opposition.

Stojanović was also included on the Radical Party's electoral list in the Serbian parliamentary election in December 2000, receiving the 211th position out of 250. The party won twenty-three seats, and he was not selected for its delegation in the National Assembly of Serbia. (From 2000 to 2011, Serbian parliamentary mandates were awarded to sponsoring parties or coalitions rather than to individual candidates, and it was common practice for mandates to be awarded out of numerical order. Stojanović could have been awarded a mandate notwithstanding his low position on the list, but he was not and instead continued to serve in the federal assembly.)

On 11 April 2002, former Serbian internal affairs minister Vlajko Stojiljković shot himself in the reception hall of the Yugoslavian federal assembly after meeting with Stojanović and handing him a suicide note. Stojiljković died two days later. His note, which was read to the media by Radical deputy Aleksandar Vučić, indicated that his action was a protest against what he described as the "puppet regime" of the Democratic Opposition of Serbia, which he accused of capitulating to international powers.

The Federal Republic of Yugoslavia was re-constituted as the State Union of Serbia and Montenegro in early 2003, and a new Assembly of Serbia and Montenegro was established with members appointed by the parliaments of its two constituent republics. Each political group in the National Assembly of Serbia was permitted to appoint a delegation to the federal assembly commensurate with its numbers. Stojanović was not initially appointed to the new assembly, but he received a mandate in February 2004, after the 2003 Serbian parliamentary election changed the standings in the Serbian assembly and necessitated a new round of appointments. He served for the next two years as an opposition member. The Assembly of Serbia and Montenegro ceased to exist in 2006, when Montenegro declared independence.

=== Member of the National Assembly of Serbia ===
Stojanović received the ninety-third position on the Radical Party's list in the 2007 Serbian parliamentary election. The party won eighty-one seats, and he was not selected for its assembly membership. He did, however, represent the party in post-election discussions with Serbian president Boris Tadić about the creation of a new government.

He was given the twenty-ninth position on the party's list for the 2008 election; the party won seventy-eight seats on this occasion, and he was included in its delegation. The results of the election were initially inconclusive, but the Radicals ultimately remained in opposition. The party experienced a serious split later in the year, with many of its members joining the more moderate Serbian Progressive Party under the leadership of Tomislav Nikolić and Aleksandar Vučić. Stojanović remained with the Radicals.

Serbia's electoral system was reformed in 2011, such that parliamentary mandates were awarded in numerical order to candidates on successful lists. Stojanović received the eightieth position on the Radical Party's list in the 2012 parliamentary election, in which the party failed to cross the electoral threshold to win representation in the assembly. He received the eighty-fifth position in the 2014 election, in which the party again fell below the threshold.

Stojanović was promoted to the twenty-third position on the Radical Party's list for the 2016 election. The party returned to the assembly with twenty-two seats, and Stojanović was not initially re-elected. He did, however, receive a mandate on 21 April 2017, as a replacement for Marko Milenković, who had resigned. The Progressive Party and its allies won the 2016 election, and the Radicals once again serve in opposition.

Stojanović was involved in a diplomatic incident in April 2018, when he and Šešelj heckled a visiting delegation from Croatia and trampled a Croatian flag that had been put on display at the Serbian assembly.

In his last assembly term, he was a member of the assembly committee on the diaspora and Serbs in the region, and a deputy member of the committee on Kosovo-Metohija and the committee on labour, social issues, social inclusion, and poverty reduction.

== Death ==
Stojanović died on 15 January 2026, at the age of 81.
