= Mihailo Ivanović (football manager) =

Serbian football manager

Personal information
- Full name: Mihailo Ivanović
- Date of birth: 4 February 1952 (age 74)
- Place of birth: Belgrade, PR Serbia, FPR Yugoslavia

Managerial career
- Years: Team
- 1992-1993: Zvezdara
- 1997: Palilulac Beograd
- 2000: Shanghai Shenhua (assistant)
- 2001: Doxa Katokopias
- 2002: Zemun
- 2003: Radnički Obrenovac
- 2004: Čukarički
- 2005: Ethnikos Achna
- 2005–2006: Voždovac
- 2006–2007: Smederevo
- 2007: Voždovac
- 2007: Xiamen Lanshi
- 2008: Rad
- 2008–2009: OFK Beograd
- 2009–2010: Budućnost Podgorica
- 2011: Novi Pazar
- 2012–2013: Voždovac
- 2015–2016: Dorćol
- 2016: Smederevo 1924
- 2016: April 25
- 2017: Dorćol
- 2017–2020: GSP Polet Dorćol
- 2021–2023: GSP Polet Dorćol
- Mladost Omoljica

Mihailo "Miki" Ivanović (Serbian Cyrillic: Михаило Мики Ивановић; born 4 February 1952) is a Serbian football manager. He formerly worked as a sports journalist.

== Journalistic career ==
Ivanović played in the youth setup of OFK Beograd, alongside Petar Borota, but prematurely ended his career due to an injury. He soon started his journalistic career and worked for JSL Sport for over two decades.

== Managerial career ==
During his managerial career, Ivanović led numerous clubs in his homeland, including Zemun, Radnički Obrenovac, and Voždovac in the First League of Serbia and Montenegro, as well as Smederevo, OFK Beograd, and Novi Pazar in the Serbian SuperLiga. He also worked professionally in China, Cyprus, Montenegro, and North Korea.

In early 2005, Ivanović was appointed as manager of Cypriot First Division side Ethnikos Achna, but was sacked after a few weeks in charge.

In late 2007, Ivanović served as manager of Chinese Super League club Xiamen Lanshi, failing to avoid relegation.
