= 2006–07 Serbian League Belgrade =

Serbian League Belgrade
- Season: 2006–07
- Champions: Hajduk Beograd
- Promoted: Hajduk Beograd
- Relegated: Budućnost Dobanovci; Slavija Beograd; Balkan Beograd; PKB Padinska Skela; Milutinac Zemun

The 2006–07 Serbian League Belgrade was the third season of the league under its current title. It began in August 2006 and ended in June 2007.

== League table ==
Pos	Team	Pld	W	D	L	GF	GA	GD	Pts	Promotion or relegation
1	Hajduk Beograd (C, P)	34	25	7	2	52	15	+37	82	Promotion to Serbian First League
2	Kolubara	34	24	6	4	74	29	+45	78	
3	Sopot	34	17	8	9	61	43	+18	59	
4	Beograd	34	14	15	5	45	29	+16	57	
5	Železničar Beograd	34	15	10	9	47	38	+9	55	
6	Teleoptik	34	16	6	12	46	34	+12	54	
7	Radnički Obrenovac	34	14	10	10	44	31	+13	52	
8	Radnički Beograd	34	13	10	11	40	37	+3	49	
9	Palilulac Beograd	34	13	6	15	38	43	−5	45	
10	Srem Jakovo	34	11	11	12	38	41	−3	44	
11	Posavac	34	12	6	16	35	46	−11	42	
12	Dorćol	34	12	6	16	36	43	−7	42	
13	Sinđelić Beograd	34	9	14	11	31	35	−4	41	
14	Milutinac Zemun (R)	34	9	9	16	28	44	−16	36	Relegation to Belgrade Zone League
15	PKB Padinska Skela (R)	34	9	8	17	41	53	−12	35	Relegation to Belgrade Zone League
16	Balkan Beograd (R)	34	6	9	19	32	48	−16	27	Relegation to Belgrade Zone League
17	Slavija Beograd (Note: 1 point deducted) (R)	34	4	9	21	20	60	−40	20	Relegation to Belgrade Zone League
18	Budućnost Dobanovci (Note: 2 points deducted) (R)	34	5	6	23	17	56	−39	19	Relegation to Belgrade Zone League

Source: srbijasport.net
Rules for classification: 1) points; 2) goal difference; 3) number of goals scored.
(C) Champions; (P) Promoted; (R) Relegated
