= FK Brodarac =

Serbian football club

Brodarac
- Full name: FK Brodarac
- Nickname: Brodari (The Bargemen)
- Founded: 1947; 79 years ago
- Stadium: Stadion FK Brodarac Beograd
- Capacity: 500 to 1,500
- President: Aleksandar Nikolić
- Head coach: Ivan Lazić
- League: Serbian League Belgrade
- 2024-25: Serbian League Belgrade, 6th of 16
- Website: Official
Home colours	Away colours	Third colours

FK Brodarac (Serbian Cyrillic: ФК Бродарац) is a football club based in New Belgrade, Serbia. They compete in the Serbian League Belgrade, the third tier of the national league system.

== History ==
In the 2010–11 season, the club won the Belgrade Second League (Group Danube) and took promotion to the Belgrade First League. They spent the next six years in the fifth tier, before placing first in the 2016–17 campaign (Group A) and earning promotion to the fourth tier. The club subsequently won the Belgrade Zone League in the 2017–18 season, being promoted to the Serbian League Belgrade.

== Honours ==
- Belgrade Zone League (Tier 4)
  - 2017–18
- Belgrade First League (Tier 5)
  - 2016–17 (Group A)
- Belgrade Second League (Tier 6)
  - 2010–11 (Group Danube)
- Belgrade Third League (Tier 7)
  - 2009–10 (Group A)

== Seasons ==
Season	League									Cup
Season	Division	Pld	W	D	L	GF	GA	Pts	Pos	Cup
Serbia
2009–10	7 – Belgrade	24	19	3	2	90	22	60	1st	—
2010–11	6 – Belgrade	24	17	4	3	56	23	55	1st	—
2011–12	5 – Belgrade	34	14	4	16	49	64	46	8th	—
2012–13	5 – Belgrade	34	16	4	14	53	51	52	8th	—
2013–14	5 – Belgrade	26	16	3	7	47	29	51	2nd	—
2014–15	5 – Belgrade	26	11	3	12	42	48	36	8th	—
2015–16	5 – Belgrade	26	19	5	2	78	22	62	2nd	—
2016–17	5 – Belgrade	26	20	4	2	75	22	64	1st	—
2017–18	4 – Belgrade	30	24	2	4	81	25	74	1st	—
2018–19	3 – Belgrade	30	12	7	11	48	41	43	7th	—
2019–20	3 – Belgrade	17 (Note: The season was cut short due to the COVID-19 pandemic in Serbia.)	6	4	7	21	23	22	8th	—
2020–21	3 – Belgrade	38	24	3	11	81	37	75	2nd	—
2021–22	3 – Belgrade	30	14	5	11	42	42	47	5th	—
2022–23	3 – Belgrade	30	12	8	10	37	40	44	5th	—
2023–24	3 – Belgrade	30	11	7	12	37	32	40	10th	—
2024–25	3 – Belgrade	26	8	4	14	32	35	28	9th	—

== Notable players ==
This is a list of players who have played at full international level.

- (Bosnia and Herzegovina) Stevo Nikolić
- (Serbia) Aleksa Pejić

For a list of all FK Brodarac players with a Wikipedia article, see Category:FK Brodarac players.

== Historical list of coaches ==
- (Serbia) Goran Serafimović (2015-2016)
- (Serbia) Željko Kalajdžić (2017-2020)
- (Serbia) Ivan Jević (2020)
- (Montenegro) Slaven Kovačević (2021)
- (Serbia) Milić Ćurčić (2021)
- (Serbia) Ljubiša Ivić (2022)
- (Serbia) Dragan Stevanović (2022)
- (Serbia) Željko Miković (2023)
- (Serbia) Vladimir Kašić (2023)
- (Serbia) Dragan Skenderija (2023)
- (Serbia) Igor Kurtović (2024)
- (Serbia) Nikola Ilić (2024-)
- (Serbia) Ivan Lazić (2025-)
