= FK Palilulac Beograd =

Serbian football club

Palilulac Beograd
- Full name: FK Palilulac Beograd
- Founded: 15 June 1924; 101 years ago
- Ground: Stadion FK Palilulac
- Capacity: 1,500
- President: Dejan Danojlić
- League: Belgrade Intermunicipal League – Group B
- 2024–25: Belgrade Intermunicipal League – Group B, 9th of 11
Home colours	Away colours

FK Palilulac Beograd (Serbian Cyrillic: ФК Палилулац Београд) is a football club based in Krnjača, Belgrade, Serbia. They compete in the Belgrade Intermunicipal League, the sixth tier of the national league system.

== History ==
The club was founded as BSK Zlatibor on 15 June 1924. The name was later changed to FK Palilulac in 1928. After the conclusion of World War II, the club was reactivated in 1948, keeping its previous name.

Following the breakup of Yugoslavia, the club won the Belgrade Zone League in the 1994–95 season and subsequently the Serbian League Belgrade in the inaugural 1995–96 edition to reach the Second League of FR Yugoslavia. They ended as runners-up in their debut appearance and narrowly missed promotion to the top flight (I/B League), losing to Spartak Subotica in the play-offs. After spending three more years in the second tier, the club finished bottom of the table in Group North in the 1999–2000 season and suffered relegation back to the Serbian League Belgrade. They were relegated to the fourth tier in 2002.

After winning the Belgrade Zone League in the 2005–06 season, the club returned to the Serbian League Belgrade. They spent the next five years in the third tier, before being relegated back to the Belgrade Zone League. On 15 August 2014, just one day ahead of the start of the new season, it was announced that the club withdrew from the league.

In the 2019–20 season, after five years of hiatus, the club started competing in the Belgrade Intermunicipal League, the sixth level of Serbian football.

== Honours ==
Serbian League Belgrade (Tier 3)

- 1995–96

Belgrade Zone League (Tier 4)

- 1994–95, 2005–06

== Seasons ==
Season	League									Cup
Season	Division	Pld	W	D	L	GF	GA	Pts	Pos	Cup
Serbia and Montenegro
1992–93	4 – Belgrade	30	16	6	8	59	41	38	4th	—
1993–94	4 – Belgrade	34	13	8	13	51	51	34	7th	—
1994–95	4 – Belgrade	38	27	6	5	101	26	87	1st	—
1995–96	3 – Belgrade	34	24	7	3	88	20	79	1st	—
1996–97	2 – East	34	21	3	10	67	33	66	2nd	—
1997–98	2 – East	34	14	9	11	51	43	51	11th	—
1998–99	2 – East	21 (Note: The season was cut short due to the NATO bombing of Yugoslavia.)	3	2	16	27	71	11	17th	—
1999–2000	2 – North	34	4	2	28	17	84	14	18th	—
2000–01	3 – Belgrade	34	19	7	8	40	26	64	4th	—
2001–02	3 – Belgrade	34	10	8	16	31	51	38	17th	—
2002–03	4 – Belgrade	34	15	5	14	47	53	50	8th	—
2003–04	4 – Belgrade	34	10	11	13	32	43	41	12th	—
2004–05	4 – Belgrade	32	11	12	9	37	30	42 (Note: The club was docked three points.)	7th	—
2005–06	4 – Belgrade	34	23	7	4	72	29	76	1st	—
Serbia
2006–07	3 – Belgrade	34	13	6	15	38	43	45	9th	—
2007–08	3 – Belgrade	30	13	6	11	45	44	45	5th	—
2008–09	3 – Belgrade	30	9	9	12	28	36	36	10th	—
2009–10	3 – Belgrade	30	9	11	10	31	33	38	10th	—
2010–11	3 – Belgrade	29	11	4	14	28	27	37	14th	—
2011–12	4 – Belgrade	34	12	7	15	51	49	43	11th	—
2012–13	4 – Belgrade	32	10	6	16	38	50	36	13th	—
2013–14	4 – Belgrade	30	10	6	14	21	34	36	11th	—

== Notable players ==
This is a list of players who have played at full international level.

- (Serbia) Aleksandar Jovanović
- (Serbia and Montenegro) Nikoslav Bjegović

For a list of all FK Palilulac Beograd players with a Wikipedia article, see Category:FK Palilulac Beograd players.

== Managerial history ==
Period	Name
	(Federal Republic of Yugoslavia) Miloljub Ostojić
	(Federal Republic of Yugoslavia) Slavko Jović
1997	(Federal Republic of Yugoslavia) Mihailo Ivanović
	(Federal Republic of Yugoslavia) Aco Trifunović
2009-2010	(Serbia) Stevo Glogovac
2010	(Serbia) Miloš Joksić
2011-2012	(Serbia) Đorđe Kunovac
