= FK Sinđelić Beograd =

Serbian football club

Sinđelić Beograd
- Full name: Fudbalski Klub Sinđelić Beograd
- Nickname: Sinđa
- Founded: 1937; 89 years ago
- Ground: Stadion FK Sinđelić, Voždovac, Belgrade
- Capacity: 1,006
- President: Milomir Božić
- Head coach: Nemanja Zlatković
- League: Belgrade Zone League
- 2024–25: Belgrade Zone League, 12th of 14
- Website: fksindjelic.rs
Home colours	Away colours

FK Sinđelić Beograd (Serbian Cyrillic: ФК Синђелић Београд) is a football club based in Belgrade, Serbia. They compete in the Belgrade Zone League, the fourth tier of the national league system.

== History ==
Founded in 1937, the club was named after the historical Serbian figure Stevan Sinđelić. They became part of a newly formed FD Drvodeljac in 1945. The club would merge with FD Građevinac to form FD Graditelj in 1946. They changed their name to Gvožđar in 1950 and finally to Sinđelić in the same year. The club competed exclusively in the lower tiers of Yugoslav football.

The club won first place in the Serbian League Belgrade at the end of the 2012–13 season and took promotion to the Serbian First League. They spent seven consecutive seasons in the second tier, before withdrawing from the league for financial reasons.

== Honours ==
- Serbian League Belgrade (Tier 3)
  - 2012–13

== Seasons ==
Season	League									Cup
Season	Division	Pld	W	D	L	GF	GA	Pts	Pos	Cup
Serbia and Montenegro
1998–99	3 – Belgrade	17 (Note: The season was cut short due to the NATO bombing of Yugoslavia.)	–	–	–	–	–	17	13th	—
1999–2000	3 – Belgrade	34	10	11	13	40	49	41	13th	—
2000–01	3 – Belgrade	34	11	6	17	39	46	39	12th	—
2001–02	3 – Belgrade	34	17	8	9	45	30	59	4th	—
2002–03	3 – Belgrade	34	12	10	12	40	41	46	14th	—
2003–04	4 – Belgrade	34	16	13	5	52	31	61	3rd	—
2004–05	4 – Belgrade	32	18	7	7	46	23	61	2nd	—
2005–06	3 – Belgrade	38	13	10	15	41	41	49	10th	—
Serbia
2006–07	3 – Belgrade	34	9	14	11	31	35	41	13th	—
2007–08	3 – Belgrade	30	11	5	14	36	40	38	11th	—
2008–09	3 – Belgrade	30	8	11	11	25	35	35	11th	—
2009–10	3 – Belgrade	30	11	7	12	42	42	40	5th	—
2010–11	3 – Belgrade	29	11	9	9	46	31	42	4th	—
2011–12	3 – Belgrade	30	10	10	10	41	35	40	8th	—
2012–13	3 – Belgrade	30	19	5	6	58	27	62	1st	—
2013–14	2	30	10	7	13	32	36	37	11th	—
2014–15	2	30	12	4	14	40	39	40	6th	Round of 32
2015–16	2	30	11	9	10	32	25	42	6th	Round of 32
2016–17	2	30	8	13	9	32	31	37	9th	Round of 32
2017–18	2	30	13	6	11	31	32	45	6th	Round of 32
2018–19	2	37	11	13	13	35	43	24	8th	Round of 16
2019–20	2	30 (Note: The season was shortened due to the COVID-19 pandemic in Serbia.)	6	7	17	27	55	25	14th (Note: The club withdrew from the league due to financial problems.)	Round of 16
2020–21	3 – Belgrade	38	15	8	15	41	37	53	14th	Preliminary round
2021–22	4 – Belgrade	30	21	4	5	66	25	67	2nd	—
2022–23	3 – Belgrade	30	9	11	10	28	30	38	8th	—
2023–24	3 – Belgrade	30	8	7	15	34	50	31	14th	—
2024–25	4 – Belgrade	26	6	2	18	39	41	20	12th	—

== Notable players ==
This is a list of players who have played at full international level.

- (Montenegro) Dejan Damjanović
- (Serbia) Aleksandar Paločević
- (Serbia) Dušan Petronijević
- (Serbia) Lazar Tufegdžić
- (Serbia and Montenegro) Slobodan Marković
- (Serbia and Montenegro) Nenad Mladenović
- (Socialist Federal Republic of Yugoslavia) Jovan Aćimović
- (Socialist Federal Republic of Yugoslavia) Miroslav Bošković
- (Socialist Federal Republic of Yugoslavia) Jusuf Hatunić
- (Socialist Federal Republic of Yugoslavia) Slobodan Janković
- (Socialist Federal Republic of Yugoslavia) Stanislav Karasi
- (Socialist Federal Republic of Yugoslavia) Blagoje Paunović

For a list of all FK Sinđelić Beograd players with a Wikipedia article, see Category:FK Sinđelić Beograd players.

== Historical list of coaches ==
- (Serbia and Montenegro) Srđan Vasiljević (2004-2006)
- (Montenegro) Dragan Đukanović (2013)
- (Serbia) Milan Lešnjak (2014)
- (Serbia) Jovan Stanković (2014)
- (Serbia) Gordan Petrić (2015)
- (Serbia) Zoran Mirković (2015)
- (Serbia) Goran Lazarević (2016)
- (Serbia) Dušan Kljajić (2016)
- (Serbia) Aleksandar Jović (2017)
- (Serbia) Bogdan Korak (2017)
- (Serbia) Slaviša Božičić (2018)
- (Serbia) Radomir Koković (2018–2019)
- (Serbia) Žarko Ćurčić (caretaker) (2019)
- (Serbia) Vladimir Madžarević (2019)
- (Serbia) Branko Mirjačić (2019)
- (Serbia) Žarko Ćurčić (caretaker) (2019)
- (Montenegro) Dragan Đukanović (2019)
- (Serbia) Uroš Kalinić (2019–2020)
- (Serbia) Miloš Lukić (2020)
- (Serbia) Dragan Perišić (2020–2021)
- (Serbia) Dejan Đuričić (2021)
- (Serbia) Aleksandar Petrović (2021)
- (Serbia) Nebojša Radišić (2022)
- (Serbia) Zlatko Krmpotić (2022–2023)
- (Serbia) Stevan Nikolić (2023)
- (Serbia) Milan Ćulum (2023-2024)
- (Serbia) Dušan Cvetković (2024)
- (Serbia) Dušan Kljajić (2024-2025)
- (Serbia) Nemanja Zlatković (2025-)
