= FK Radnički Obrenovac =

Serbian football club

Radnički Obrenovac
- Full name: Fudbalski Klub Radnički Obrenovac
- Nicknames: Raba; Bordo-žuti (The Maroon-Yellows)
- Founded: 1927; 99 years ago
- Ground: Stadion kraj Kolubare
- Capacity: 6,000
- President: Dragan Blažić
- Head coach: Zdravko Kovačević
- League: Serbian League Belgrade
- 2024–25: Serbian League Belgrade, 2nd
Home colours	Away colours

FK Radnički Obrenovac (Serbian Cyrillic: ФК Раднички Обреновац) is a football club based in Obrenovac, Belgrade, Serbia. They compete in the Serbian League Belgrade, the third tier of the national league system.

== History ==
The club was founded as Radnički in 1927 on the initiative of the Communist Party of Yugoslavia (KPJ). They were soon forced to change their name to Karađorđe. During the 1930s and 1940s, the club would change names several more times, being known as OSK, Trgovački, and Zanatlija.

The club was reactivated under its original name after World War II in 1945. They won the Serbian League in 1950, but lost to Proleter Zrenjanin in the play-offs for the Yugoslav Second League. The club later competed in the Serbian League North, the third tier of Yugoslav football, on two occasions (1962–63 and 1965–66).

After merging with Milicionar, the club won the Second League of FR Yugoslavia (Group North) in 2002, earning promotion to the First League of FR Yugoslavia. They secured their league status in their debut season in the top flight, finishing in 12th place. However, the club failed to avoid relegation in the 2003–04 season. They subsequently placed 17th in the 2004–05 Second League of Serbia and Montenegro (Group Serbia) and were relegated to the Serbian League Belgrade after losing to Sevojno in the play-offs. Over the next two decades, the club went on to compete in the third tier of Serbian football, finishing as runners-up four times (2007–08, 2009–10, 2011–12, and 2012–13).

== Honours ==
- Second League of FR Yugoslavia (Tier 2)
  - 2001–02 (Group North)

== Seasons ==
Season	League									Cup
Season	Division	Pld	W	D	L	GF	GA	Pts	Pos	Cup
Serbia and Montenegro
2001–02	2 – North	34	22	8	4	47	15	74	1st	Quarter-finals
2002–03	1	34	11	11	12	35	41	44	12th	—
2003–04	1	30	4	12	14	18	47	24	15th	Round of 32
2004–05	2 – Serbia	38	11	10	17	26	50	43	17th	Round of 32
2005–06	3 – Belgrade	38	14	4	20	45	56	46	16th	—
Serbia
2006–07	3 – Belgrade	34	14	10	10	44	31	52	7th	—
2007–08	3 – Belgrade	30	16	9	5	42	26	57	2nd	—
2008–09	3 – Belgrade	30	9	10	11	29	34	37	9th	—
2009–10	3 – Belgrade	30	17	6	7	56	28	54 (Note: The club was docked three points.)	2nd	—
2010–11	3 – Belgrade	30	10	9	11	40	32	39	9th	—
2011–12	3 – Belgrade	30	17	8	5	42	23	59	2nd	—
2012–13	3 – Belgrade	30	17	7	6	50	24	58	2nd	—
2013–14	3 – Belgrade	30	12	9	9	52	44	45	6th	—
2014–15	3 – Belgrade	30	8	5	17	30	49	29	14th	—
2015–16	3 – Belgrade	30	12	5	13	54	57	41	8th	—
2016–17	3 – Belgrade	30	12	7	11	48	44	43	10th	—
2017–18	3 – Belgrade	30	15	7	8	51	35	52	5th	—
2018–19	3 – Belgrade	30	11	11	8	33	31	44	6th	—
2019–20	3 – Belgrade	17 (Note: The season was cut short due to the COVID-19 pandemic in Serbia.)	5	6	6	21	19	21	10th	—
2020–21	3 – Belgrade	38	18	8	12	57	38	62	4th	—
2021–22	3 – Belgrade	30	10	9	11	34	44	39	10th	—
2022–23	3 – Belgrade	30	10	6	14	40	39	36	11th	—
2023–24	3 – Belgrade	30	13	6	11	45	41	43 (Note: The club was docked two points.)	4th	—
2024–25	3 – Belgrade	26	16	6	4	56	24	54	2nd	—

== Notable players ==
This is a list of players who have played at full international level.

- (Bosnia and Herzegovina) Dušan Kerkez
- (Bosnia and Herzegovina) Nemanja Supić
- (Montenegro) Nikola Vujnović
- (North Macedonia) Goran Lazarevski
- (Puerto Rico) Chris Megaloudis
- (Serbia) Jovan Damjanović
- (Serbia) Filip Đuričić
- (Serbia) Marko Jevremović
- (Serbia) Radosav Petrović
- (Serbia) Alen Stevanović
- (Serbia) Veseljko Trivunović
- (Serbia and Montenegro) Nenad Jestrović
- (Serbia and Montenegro) Jovan Markoski

For a list of all FK Radnički Obrenovac players with a Wikipedia article, see Category:FK Radnički Obrenovac players.

== Historical list of coaches ==
- (Serbia and Montenegro) Milorad Rajković
- (Serbia and Montenegro) Branko Smiljanić (2001)
- (Serbia and Montenegro) Milenko Kiković (2001–2002)
- (North Macedonia) Boško Đurovski (2002)
- (Bosnia and Herzegovina) Cvijetin Blagojević (2002–2003)
- (Serbia and Montenegro) Velibor Đurić (caretaker) (2003)
- (Serbia and Montenegro) Mihailo Ivanović (2003)
- (Serbia and Montenegro) Goran Milojević (2003)
- (Serbia and Montenegro) Miodrag Marinković (2003)
- (Serbia and Montenegro) Goran Milojević (2004)
- (Serbia and Montenegro) Bogić Bogićević (2004)
- (Serbia and Montenegro) Žarko Đurović (2005)
- (Bosnia and Herzegovina) Vlado Čapljić
- (Serbia) Miloš Veselinović
- (Serbia) Nenad Stojković (2010)
- (Serbia) Nebojša Milošević (2011–2012)
- (Serbia) Miloš Veselinović (2012–2013)
- (Serbia) Dejan Đuričić (2014)
- (Serbia) Branko Rašić (2014–2015)
- (Serbia) Dejan Đuričić (2015–2017)
- (Serbia) Miloš Bojanić (2018–2019)
- (Montenegro) Slaven Kovačević (2019)
- (Serbia) Miloš Bojanić (2019–2020)
- (Serbia) Saša Stojadinović (2020–2021)
- (Serbia) Dejan Đuričić (2021–2022)
- (Serbia) Saša Stojadinović (2023)
- (Serbia) Jovan Markoski (2023–2024)
- (Serbia) Zdravko Kovačević (2024–2025)
- (Serbia) Žarko Jovanović (2025–)
