= 2001–02 FR Yugoslavia Cup =

Tournament details
- Country: Yugoslavia
- Teams: 32

Final positions
- Champions: Red Star
- Runners-up: Sartid

Tournament statistics
- Matches played: 31
- Goals scored: 67 (2.16 per match)

The 2001–02 FR Yugoslavia Cup was the tenth and last full season of the FR Yugoslavia's annual football cup. The cup defenders was FK Partizan, but was defeated by FK Železnik in the quarter-finals. Red Star Belgrade has the winner of the competition, after they defeated FK Sartid.

== First round ==
Thirty-two teams entered in the First Round. The matches were played on 10 October 2001.

Team 1	Score	Team 2
AIK Bačka Topola (II)	0–3	Partizan
Borac Čačak (II)	0–1	Obilić
Red Star	1–0	Dubočica (II)
Čukarički	3–1	Rudar Pljevlja
Hajduk Kula	2–0	Radnički Beograd
Ibar Leposavić (III)	0–3	Vojvodina
Mladi Radnik (II)	0–1	Rad
Mladost Podgorica (II)	2–0	Napredak Kruševac (II)
Proleter Zrenjanin (II)	0–2^{1}	OFK Beograd
Radnički Klupci (III)	0–0 (5–6 p)	Budućnost Podgorica (II)
Radnički Kragujevac	2–1	Radnički Niš (II)
Radnički Obrenovac (II)	1–0	Sutjeska
Sartid	3–0	ČSK Čelarevo
Teleoptik	1–1 (1–4 p)	Železnik
Zemun	2–1	Mladost Apatin
Zeta	3–0	Šumadija Kragujevac (II)

^{1}The match was played in Belgrade.
Note: Roman numerals in brackets denote the league tier the clubs participated in the 2001–02 season.

== Second round ==
The 16 winners from the prior round enter this round. The matches were played on 23, 24, 30 October 2001.

Team 1	Score	Team 2
Red Star	3–0	Zeta
Vojvodina	3–0	Čukarički
Budućnost Podgorica (II)	0–1	Železnik
Obilić	1–1 (4–5 p)	Radnički Kragujevac
Radnički Obrenovac (II)	2–0	Mladost Podgorica (II)
Sartid	1–0	Hajduk Kula
Partizan	4–0	Rad
Zemun	1–4	OFK Beograd

Note: Roman numerals in brackets denote the league tier the clubs participated in the 2001–02 season.

== Quarter-finals ==
The eight winners from the prior round enter this round. The matches were played on 21 and 27 November 2001.

Team 1	Score	Team 2
Red Star	1–0	Radnički Obrenovac (II)
Radnički Kragujevac	0–1	Vojvodina
Sartid	0–0 (4–2 p)	OFK Beograd
Železnik	1–1 (4–3 p)	Partizan

Note: Roman numerals in brackets denote the league tier the clubs participated in the 2001–02 season.

== Semi-finals ==
8 May 2002
17:00

Železnik	2–3	Sartid
Marković 37'; Majstorović 85'		Mirosavljević 10', 62'; Kekezović 36'

Železnik Stadium, Belgrade
Attendance: 7,000
Referee: Miroslav Radoman (Lovćenac)
8 May 2002
18:00

Vojvodina	1–1	Red Star
Bogdanović 78' (pen.)		Pjanović 24'
Penalties
Vukelja (penalty missed); Tanasijević (penalty scored); Jovanović (penalty scored); Krivokapić (penalty scored)	3–5	(penalty scored) Pjanović; (penalty scored) Marković; (penalty scored) Vidić; (penalty scored) Milovanović; (penalty scored) Bratić

Karađorđe Stadium, Novi Sad
Attendance: 15,000
Referee: Aleksandar Marković (Cetinje)

== Final ==
29 May 2002
18:00

Sartid	0–1	Red Star
	Report	Pjanović 20'

Partizan Stadium, Belgrade
Attendance: 15,000
Referee: Miroslav Radoman (Lovćenac)

== See also ==
- 2001–02 First League of FR Yugoslavia
- 2001–02 Second League of FR Yugoslavia
