= 2009–10 Serbian League Belgrade =

Serbian League Belgrade
- Season: 2009–10
- Champions: BASK
- Promoted: BASK
- Relegated: Železničar Beograd

The 2009–10 Serbian League Belgrade was the sixth season of the league under its current title. It began in August 2009 and ended in June 2010.

== League table ==
Pos	Team	Pld	W	D	L	GF	GA	GD	Pts	Promotion or relegation
1	BASK (C, P)	30	17	7	6	49	35	+14	58	Promotion to Serbian First League
2	Radnički Obrenovac	30	17	6	7	56	28	+28	57	
3	Šumadija Jagnjilo	30	15	11	4	45	20	+25	56	
4	Srem Jakovo	30	11	10	9	48	41	+7	43	
5	Sinđelić Beograd	30	11	7	12	42	42	0	40	
6	Voždovac	30	9	13	8	27	27	0	40	
7	Beograd	30	10	10	10	30	31	−1	40	
8	Resnik	30	10	9	11	34	39	−5	39	
9	Kovačevac	30	10	9	11	46	52	−6	39	
10	Palilulac Beograd	30	9	11	10	31	33	−2	38	
11	Hajduk Beograd	30	10	6	14	42	51	−9	36	
12	Dorćol	30	9	9	12	34	36	−2	36	
13	Mladenovac	30	10	5	15	28	38	−10	35	
14	Grafičar Beograd	30	9	7	14	28	44	−16	34	
15	Sopot	30	7	12	11	28	33	−5	33	
16	Železničar Beograd (R)	30	4	12	14	25	43	−18	24	Relegation to Belgrade Zone League

Source: srbijasport.net
Rules for classification: 1) points; 2) goal difference; 3) number of goals scored.
(C) Champions; (P) Promoted; (R) Relegated
