= FK Teleoptik =

Serbian football club

Teleoptik
- Full name: Fudbalski klub Teleoptik
- Nickname: Optičari (The Opticians)
- Founded: 1952; 74 years ago
- Ground: SC Partizan-Teleoptik
- Capacity: 1,000
- President: Danilo Vukićević
- Head coach: Marko Jovanović
- League: Serbian First League
- 2025–26: Serbian League Belgrade, 1st of 14 (promoted)
- Website: fcteleoptik.rs
| Home colours | Away colours |

FK Teleoptik (Serbian Cyrillic: ФК Телеоптик) is a football club based in Zemun, Belgrade, Serbia. They compete in the Serbian First League, the second tier of the national league system.

== History ==
The club was founded by the manufacturing company of the same name in 1952. They played in the local leagues of Belgrade within the Yugoslav football league system, but without notable achievements. In the early 1990s, when the country started breaking apart, the club agreed to an affiliate partnership with FK Partizan. One of the most significant aspects of this cooperation was the construction of the SC Partizan-Teleoptik, which was officially opened in May 1998.

In the NATO bombing-suspended 1998–99 season, the club finished second in the Serbian League Belgrade and gained promotion to the Second League of FR Yugoslavia. After easily securing league status in their debut appearance, they made an even better result in the 2000–01 season, earning a fifth-place finish. However, the club failed to avoid relegation in 2002, when the competition changed its format.

In 2009, having spent seven consecutive seasons in the Serbian League Belgrade, the club reached the Serbian First League after finishing in second place and defeating Serbian League East runners-up Timok in the promotion play-offs. They remained in the second tier for five seasons until relegation in 2014. After winning the Serbian League Belgrade in 2017, the club returned to the Serbian First League, but again suffered relegation in 2019.

== Honours ==
- Serbian League Belgrade (Tier 3)
  - Champions (3): 2016–17, 2020–21, 2025–26

== Seasons ==
| Season | League | | | | | | | | | Cup |
| Season | Division | Pld | W | D | L | GF | GA | Pts | Pos | Cup |
Serbia and Montenegro
| 1998–99 | 3 – Belgrade | 17 (Note: The season was cut short due to the NATO bombing of Yugoslavia.) | – | – | – | – | – | 38 | 2nd | Round of 32 |
| 1999–2000 | 2 – North | 34 | 15 | 5 | 14 | 57 | 55 | 50 | 11th | — |
| 2000–01 | 2 – North | 34 | 19 | 4 | 11 | 59 | 34 | 61 | 5th | — |
| 2001–02 | 2 – North | 34 | 12 | 3 | 19 | 49 | 50 | 39 | 14th | Round of 32 |
| 2002–03 | 3 – Belgrade | 34 | 15 | 9 | 10 | 58 | 35 | 54 | 5th | — |
| 2003–04 | 3 – Belgrade | 34 | 17 | 8 | 9 | 74 | 41 | 59 | 3rd | — |
| 2004–05 | 3 – Belgrade | 34 | 16 | 8 | 10 | 59 | 40 | 56 | 4th | — |
| 2005–06 | 3 – Belgrade | 38 | 18 | 9 | 11 | 71 | 37 | 62 (Note: The club was docked one point.) | 4th | — |
Serbia
| 2006–07 | 3 – Belgrade | 34 | 16 | 6 | 12 | 46 | 34 | 54 | 6th | Round of 32 |
| 2007–08 | 3 – Belgrade | 30 | 13 | 10 | 7 | 41 | 18 | 49 | 4th | Round of 32 |
| 2008–09 | 3 – Belgrade | 30 | 22 | 5 | 3 | 54 | 13 | 71 | 2nd | — |
| 2009–10 | 2 | 34 | 14 | 8 | 12 | 38 | 31 | 50 | 6th | — |
| 2010–11 | 2 | 34 | 9 | 12 | 13 | 35 | 44 | 39 | 13th | Quarter-finals |
| 2011–12 | 2 | 34 | 12 | 13 | 9 | 45 | 26 | 49 | 8th | Round of 32 |
| 2012–13 | 2 | 34 | 8 | 12 | 14 | 25 | 43 | 36 | 13th | Round of 32 |
| 2013–14 | 2 | 30 | 8 | 7 | 15 | 35 | 40 | 31 | 15th | Round of 32 |
| 2014–15 | 3 – Belgrade | 30 | 20 | 6 | 4 | 70 | 21 | 66 | 2nd | Preliminary round |
| 2015–16 | 3 – Belgrade | 30 | 17 | 9 | 4 | 48 | 23 | 60 | 2nd | — |
| 2016–17 | 3 – Belgrade | 30 | 19 | 5 | 6 | 54 | 23 | 62 | 1st | — |
| 2017–18 | 2 | 30 | 10 | 10 | 10 | 39 | 32 | 40 | 8th | — |
| 2018–19 | 2 | 37 | 7 | 10 | 20 | 31 | 58 | 18 | 15th | Round of 32 |
| 2019–20 | 3 – Belgrade | 17 (Note: The season was cut short due to the COVID-19 pandemic in Serbia.) | 5 | 6 | 6 | 19 | 19 | 21 | 11th | Round of 16 |
| 2020–21 | 3 – Belgrade | 38 | 23 | 8 | 7 | 71 | 38 | 77 | 1st | — |
| 2021–22 | 3 – Belgrade | 30 | 12 | 8 | 10 | 45 | 36 | 44 | 6th | — |
| 2022–23 | 3 – Belgrade | 30 | 15 | 7 | 8 | 51 | 24 | 52 | 3rd | — |
| 2023–24 | 3 – Belgrade | 30 | 20 | 3 | 7 | 59 | 26 | 63 | 2nd | — |
| 2024–25 | 3 – Belgrade | 26 | 15 | 6 | 5 | 39 | 21 | 51 | 3rd | — |
| 2025–26 | 3 – Belgrade | — | — | — | — | — | — | — | 1st | — |

== Players ==
=== Current squad ===
As of 15 August 2026

Note: Flags indicate national team as defined under FIFA eligibility rules; some limited exceptions apply. Players may hold more than one non-FIFA nationality.

| No. | Pos. | Nation | Player |
|---|---|---|---|
| 1 | GK | SRB | Marko Stailković |
| 2 | DF | SRB | Uroš Stevanović |
| 3 | DF | SRB | Relja Premović (on loan from Partizan) |
| 4 | DF | SRB | Vojin Marinković (dual registration with Partizan) |
| 5 | DF | SRB | Dušan Cvetinović |
| 6 | MF | SRB | Filip Markišić |
| 7 | FW | SRB | Dušan Radović (on loan from Partizan) |
| 8 | FW | SRB | Viktor Živojinović |
| 9 | FW | MNE | Vasilije Kračković |
| 10 | FW | SRB | Matija Ninić (dual registration with Partizan) |
| 11 | DF | SRB | Filip Ristić |
| 12 | GK | MKD | Pavel Trajkovski |
| 14 | MF | SRB | Vuk Adžić (on loan from Partizan) |
| 15 | DF | SRB | Nikola Popović (on loan from Partizan) |
| 16 | DF | NGR | Abdulmalik Mohammed (on loan from Partizan) |
| 18 | FW | SRB | Stefan Đurović (on loan from Partizan) |
| 19 | MF | SRB | Filip Ivelja |

| No. | Pos. | Nation | Player |
|---|---|---|---|
| 20 | MF | SRB | Nikola Virijević (on loan from Partizan) |
| 21 | DF | SRB | Danilo Bulatović (on loan from Partizan) |
| 22 | MF | SRB | Duško Janačković (on loan from Partizan) |
| 23 | DF | SRB | Matija Ljubojević |
| 24 | FW | SRB | Ivan Martinović (on loan from Partizan) |
| 25 | MF | SRB | Sergej Mladenović (on loan from Partizan) |
| 26 | MF | SRB | Dušan Makević (dual registration with Partizan; vice-captain) |
| 27 | DF | SRB | Danilo Vuković (on loan from Partizan) |
| 28 | FW | SRB | Dušan Jovanović (dual registration with Partizan) |
| 29 | FW | SRB | Lazar Radosavljević (on loan from Partizan) |
| 30 | MF | SRB | Danilo Bacanović |
| 31 | GK | SRB | Veljko Popović (on loan from Partizan; captain) |
| 32 | FW | CAF | Bradley Besnard |
| 33 | DF | SRB | Despot Obrenović |
| 34 | GK | SRB | Miloš Kosanović |
| 40 | FW | SRB | Stefan Šćepović |

=== Other players under contract ===
Note: Flags indicate national team as defined under FIFA eligibility rules; some limited exceptions apply. Players may hold more than one non-FIFA nationality.

| No. | Pos. | Nation | Player |
|---|---|---|---|
| — | DF | SRB | Vuk Topličević |

=== Coaching staff ===
| Position | Name |
|---|---|
| Head coach | (Serbia) Marko Jovanović |
| Assistant coach | (Serbia) Vlado Čapljić (Serbia) Lazar Tomić (Serbia) Nikola Grubješić (Serbia) Marko Šćepović |
| Goalkeeping coach | (Serbia) Igor Baletić (Serbia) Marko Lazarević |
| Fitness coach | (Serbia) Matija Krstović (Serbia) Gligorije Goranić |
| Analyst | (Serbia) Bogdan Milićević (Serbia) Filip Stevanović |
| Doctor | (Serbia) Ilija Rosić |
| Physiotherapist | (Serbia) Nikola Šijan |
| Team manager | (Serbia) Marko Ranevski |
| Match manager | (Serbia) Goran Mance |
| PR club | (Serbia) Kristina Nenadić |
| Economic | (Serbia) Zoran Stanojević |

== Notable players ==
This is a list of players who have played at full international level.

- (Bosnia and Herzegovina) Admir Aganović
- (Bosnia and Herzegovina) Samir Memišević
- (Bulgaria) Ivan Čvorović
- (Burkina Faso) Dramane Salou
- (Montenegro) Darko Božović
- (Montenegro) Andrija Delibašić
- (Montenegro) Nikola Drinčić
- (Montenegro) Marko Janković
- (Montenegro) Ivan Kecojević
- (Montenegro) Milan Roganović
- (Montenegro) Goran Vujović
- (Montenegro) (Serbia and Montenegro) Simon Vukčević
- (Nigeria) Ifeanyi Emeghara
- (North Macedonia) Stefan Aškovski
- (North Macedonia) Aleksandar Lazevski
- (North Macedonia) Predrag Ranđelović
- (North Macedonia) Perica Stančeski
- (North Macedonia) Ostoja Stjepanović
- (Puerto Rico) Andrés Cabrero
- (Serbia) Nikola Aksentijević
- (Serbia) Stefan Babović
- (Serbia) Veljko Birmančević
- (Serbia) Miroslav Bogosavac
- (Serbia) Miloš Bogunović
- (Serbia) Vanja Dragojević
- (Serbia) (Serbia and Montenegro) Saša Ilić
- (Serbia) Miloš Jojić
- (Serbia) Filip Kljajić
- (Serbia) (Serbia and Montenegro) Danko Lazović
- (Serbia) Nenad Lukić
- (Serbia) Saša Lukić
- (Serbia) Nikola Milenković
- (Serbia) Aleksandar Mitrović
- (Serbia) Matija Nastasić
- (Serbia) Jovan Nišić
- (Serbia) Ivan Obradović
- (Serbia) Nemanja Petrović
- (Serbia) Petar Petrović
- (Serbia) Aleksandar Popović
- (Serbia) Ivan Radovanović
- (Serbia) (Serbia and Montenegro) Nemanja Rnić
- (Serbia) Marko Šćepović
- (Serbia) Stefan Šćepović
- (Serbia) Petar Škuletić
- (Serbia) Milan Smiljanić
- (Serbia) Vojislav Stanković
- (Serbia) Miralem Sulejmani
- (Serbia) Nemanja Tomić
- (Serbia) Ognjen Ugrešić
- (Serbia) Jovan Vlalukin
- (Serbia and Montenegro) Milivoje Ćirković
- (United Arab Emirates) Saša Ivković

For a list of all FK Teleoptik players with a Wikipedia article, see Category:FK Teleoptik players.

== Historical list of coaches ==
- (Socialist Federal Republic of Yugoslavia) Zdravko Zemunović
- (Serbia and Montenegro) Blagoje Paunović (1999–2002)
- (Serbia and Montenegro) Vladimir Vermezović (2002–2003)
- (Serbia and Montenegro) Dušan Trbojević (2004)
- (Serbia and Montenegro) Blagoje Paunović & (Serbia and Montenegro) Zvonko Varga (2005–2006)
- (Serbia) Miloš Radaković (2007)
- (Serbia) Zvonko Varga (2008–2010)
- (Serbia) Vuk Rašović (2011–2013)
- (Serbia) Zvonko Živković (2013)
- (Serbia) Igor Spasić (2013–2015)
- (Serbia) Ivan Tomić (2015)
- (Serbia) Igor Spasić (2016)
- (Serbia) Milan Ristić (2016–2019)
- (Serbia) Žarko Lazetić (2019)
- (Serbia) Albert Nađ (2019–2022)
- (Serbia) Igor Duljaj (2022–2023)
- (North Macedonia) Milan Stojanoski (2023)
- (Serbia) Strahinja Pandurović (2023–Jun 2025)
- (Serbia) Nenad Stojaković (2025)
- (Serbia) Marko Jovanović (Nov 2025–)

For a list of all FK Teleoptik managers with a Wikipedia article, see Category:FK Teleoptik managers.
