= 2008–09 Serbian League Belgrade =

Serbian League Belgrade
- Season: 2008–09
- Champions: Zemun
- Promoted: Zemun; Teleoptik
- Relegated: Radnički Beograd; PKB Padinska Skela; Lisović
- Top goalscorer: Dejan Lekić

The 2008–09 Serbian League Belgrade was the fifth season of the league under its current title. It began in August 2008 and ended in June 2009.

== League table ==
Pos	Team	Pld	W	D	L	GF	GA	GD	Pts	Promotion or relegation
1	Zemun (C, P)	30	26	1	3	59	12	+47	79	Promotion to Serbian First League
2	Teleoptik (P)	30	22	5	3	54	13	+41	71	Qualification for promotion play-offs
3	Šumadija Jagnjilo	30	16	6	8	33	19	+14	54	
4	Srem Jakovo	30	12	7	11	33	32	+1	43	
5	Sopot	30	10	9	11	30	30	0	39	
6	Radnički Obrenovac	30	9	10	11	29	34	−5	37	
7	Železničar Beograd	30	8	13	9	26	29	−3	37	
8	Dorćol	30	10	7	13	31	35	−4	37	
9	Beograd	30	11	4	15	38	39	−1	37	
10	Palilulac Beograd	30	9	9	12	28	36	−8	36	
11	Sinđelić Beograd	30	8	11	11	25	35	−10	35	
12	BASK	30	8	11	11	20	31	−11	35	
13	Mladenovac	30	8	11	11	23	37	−14	35	
14	Lisović (R)	30	9	7	14	23	35	−12	34	Relegation to Belgrade Zone League
15	PKB Padinska Skela (R)	30	7	8	15	25	40	−15	29	Relegation to Belgrade Zone League
16	Radnički Beograd (R)	30	4	7	19	22	43	−21	19	Relegation to Belgrade Zone League

Source: srbijasport.net
Rules for classification: 1) points; 2) goal difference; 3) number of goals scored.
(C) Champions; (P) Promoted; (R) Relegated
