= FK Dorćol =

Serbian football club

Dorćol
- Full name: Fudbalski Klub Dorćol
- Nickname: Gaučosi (The Gauchos)
- Founded: 1952; 74 years ago
- Dissolved: 2017; 9 years ago (became FK GSP Polet Dorćol)
- Ground: Stadion FK Dorćol
- Capacity: 1,000
- 2016–17: Serbian League Belgrade, 11th of 16
Home colours	Away colours

FK Dorćol (Serbian Cyrillic: ФК Дорћол) was a football club based in Dorćol, Belgrade, Serbia which became FK GSP Polet Dorćol.

== History ==
Founded in 1952, the club won the Serbian League Belgrade in the 2001–02 season and took promotion to the Second League of FR Yugoslavia for the first time in history. They placed ninth in Group North and immediately suffered relegation back to the third tier. In 2017, the club merged with local rivals FK GSP Polet to form FK GSP Polet Dorćol.

== Honours ==
Serbian League Belgrade (Tier 3)

- 2001–02

== Notable players ==
For a list of all FK Dorćol players with a Wikipedia article, see Category:FK Dorćol players.

== Managerial history ==
Period	Name
2001-2002	(Serbia) Nebojša Vučićević
2008	(Serbia) Nebojša Vučićević
2008	(Serbia) Goran Nikić
2015-2016	(Serbia) Mihailo Ivanović
2017	(Serbia) Mihailo Ivanović
