= Serbian League Belgrade =

- Country: Serbia
- Number of clubs: 14
- Level on pyramid: 3
- Promotion to: Serbian First League
- Relegation to: Belgrade Zone League
- Domestic cup: Serbian Cup
- Current champions: Teleoptik (3rd title) (2025–26)
- Most championships: Kolubara; Mladenovac; Teleoptik; Zemun (3 titles each)
- Current: 2026–27 Serbian League Belgrade

Serbian League Belgrade (Serbian: Српска лига Београд / Srpska liga Beograd) is one of four sections of the Serbian League, the third tier of professional football in Serbia. The other three sections are Serbian League East, Serbian League Vojvodina and Serbian League West.

== Seasons ==
Season	Winner	Runner-up
Serbia and Montenegro
1995–96	Palilulac	
1996–97	Milicionar	
1997–98	Kolubara	
1998–99	BSK Borča	Teleoptik
1999–00	Bežanija	Mladi Obilić
2000–01	Mladenovac	Balkan Mirijevo
2001–02	Dorćol	Srem Jakovo
2002–03	Bežanija	Voždovac
2003–04	Voždovac	Kneževac
2004–05	Mladenovac	Posavac
2005–06	BSK Borča	Beograd
Serbia
2006–07	Hajduk Beograd	Kolubara
2007–08	Kolubara	Radnički Obrenovac
2008–09	Zemun	Teleoptik
2009–10	BASK	Radnički Obrenovac
2010–11	Mladenovac	Srem Jakovo
2011–12	Voždovac	Radnički Obrenovac
2012–13	Sinđelić Beograd	Radnički Obrenovac
2013–14	Kolubara	Žarkovo
2014–15	Zemun	Teleoptik
2015–16	Budućnost Dobanovci	Teleoptik
2016–17	Teleoptik	BSK Batajnica
2017–18	Žarkovo	Grafičar Beograd
2018–19	Grafičar Beograd	IMT
2019–20	IMT	Zvezdara
2020–21	Teleoptik	Brodarac
2021–22	Radnički Beograd	Zemun
2022–23	OFK Beograd	Zemun
2023–24	Zemun	Teleoptik
2024–25	Ušće	Radnički Obrenovac
2025–26	Teleoptik	Radnički Obrenovac

== Member clubs (2026–27) ==
Locations of the 2026–27 Serbian League Belgrade clubs
1 BASK
2 Bežanija
3 Brodarac
4 BSK 1926
5 Budućnost
6 GSP Polet
7 Jedinstvo
8 PKB 1950
9 Prva Iskra
10 Radnički
11 T6 NIKA
12 Torlak
13 Ušće
14 Zvezdara

The following 14 clubs compete in the Serbian League Belgrade during the 2026–27 season. Previous-season positions refer to the 2025–26 Serbian League Belgrade unless otherwise indicated.

Club	Location	2025–26 position
Ušće	New Belgrade	16th (Serbian First League)
Radnički	Obrenovac	2nd
Torlak	Kumodraž	3rd
Brodarac	New Belgrade	4th
PKB 1950	Dudovica	5th
Jedinstvo	Surčin	6th
Budućnost	Dobanovci	7th
T6 NIKA	Glogonjski Rit	8th
Prva Iskra	Barič	9th
GSP Polet	Dorćol	10th
Zvezdara	Zvezdara	11th
BASK	Savski Venac	12th
Bežanija	New Belgrade	1st (Belgrade Zone League)
BSK 1926	Baćevac	2nd (Belgrade Zone League)
