= List of FK Rad managers =

FK Rad is a professional football club based in Banjica, Belgrade, Serbia.

== Managers ==
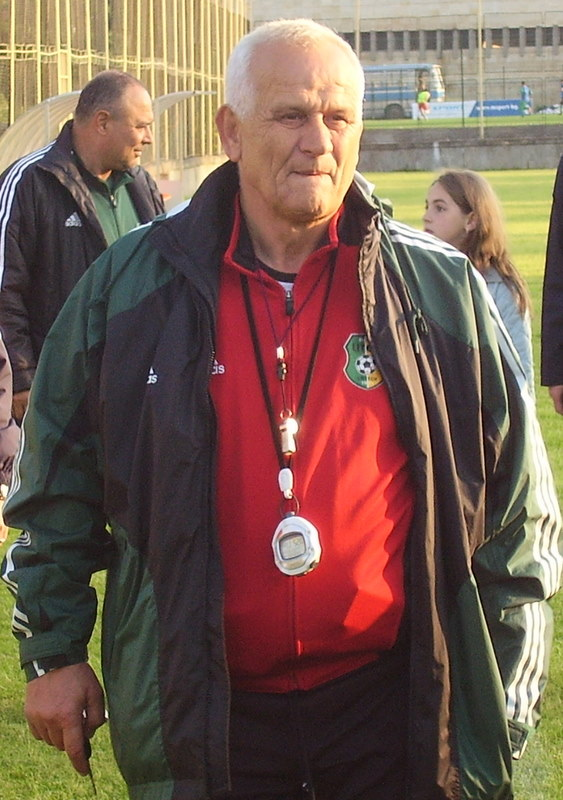
Ljupko Petrović

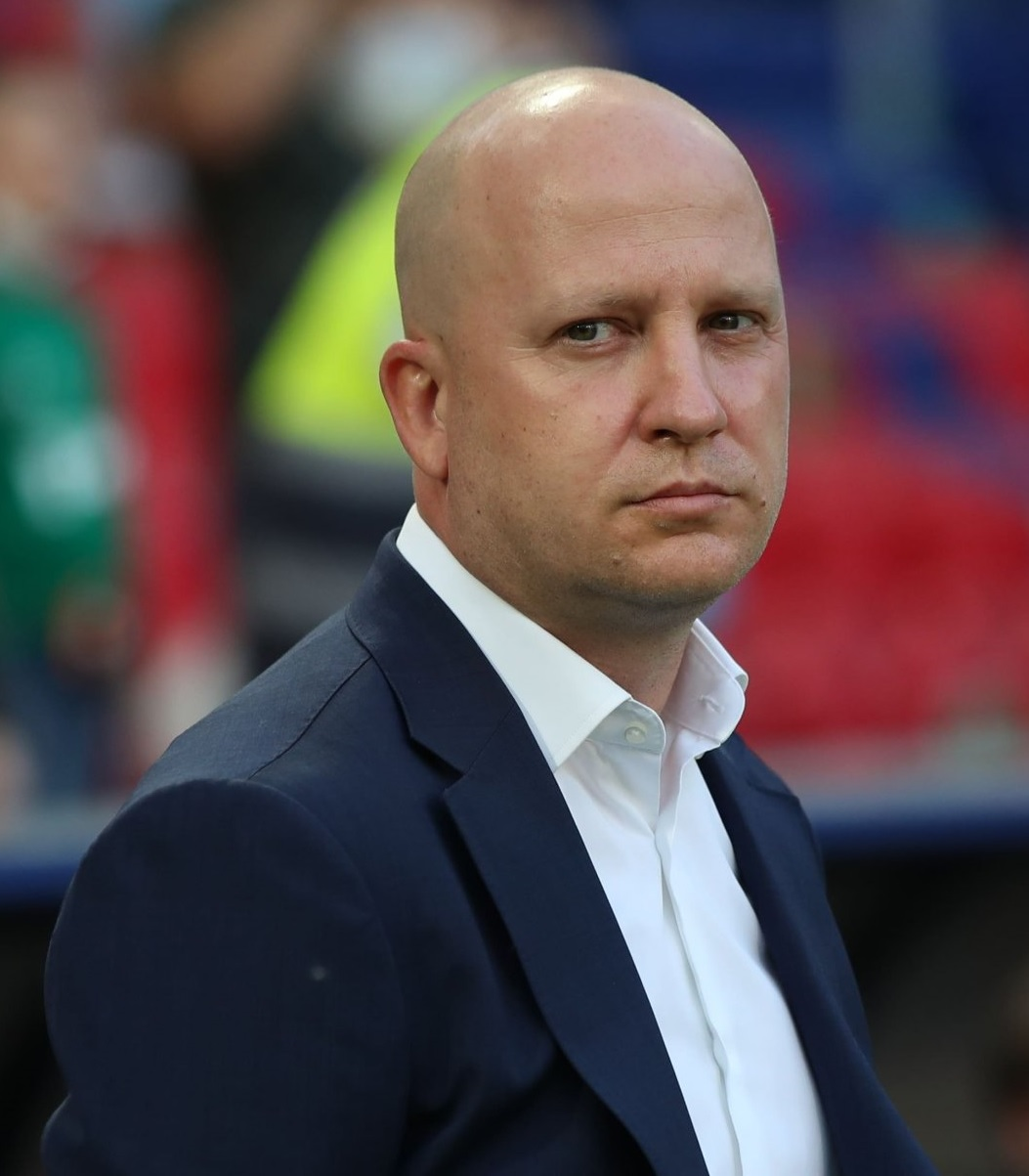
Marko Nikolić

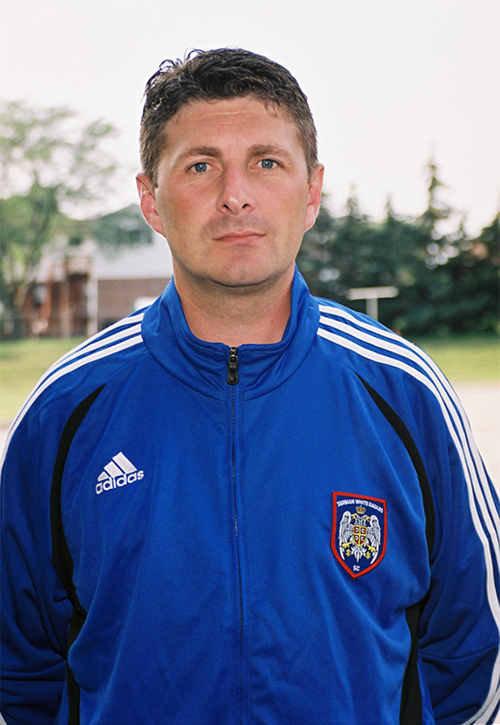
Stevan Mojsilović

Name	Period		Pld	W	D	L	Win %	Honours
Name	From	To	Pld	W	D	L	Win %	Honours
(Socialist Federal Republic of Yugoslavia) Mirko Damjanović								
(Socialist Federal Republic of Yugoslavia) Đorđe Gerum								
(Socialist Federal Republic of Yugoslavia) Milan Živadinović								
(Socialist Federal Republic of Yugoslavia) Žarko Nedeljković	1985	March 1987						
(Socialist Federal Republic of Yugoslavia) Dragan Gugleta	March 1987	1989						
(Socialist Federal Republic of Yugoslavia) Ivica Brzić	1989	December 1989						
(Socialist Federal Republic of Yugoslavia) Ljupko Petrović	December 1989	June 1990						
(Socialist Federal Republic of Yugoslavia) Dragutin Spasojević	June 1990	1990						
(Socialist Federal Republic of Yugoslavia) Dragan Gugleta	1990	1991						
(Federal Republic of Yugoslavia) Tomislav Manojlović	1991	1994						
(Federal Republic of Yugoslavia) Boško Antić	1994	1995						
(Federal Republic of Yugoslavia) Milenko Kiković	1995	1997						
(Federal Republic of Yugoslavia) Čedomir Đoinčević	April 1997	1999						
(Federal Republic of Yugoslavia) Nebojša Petrović	2000	2000						
(Federal Republic of Yugoslavia) Čedomir Đoinčević	2001	December 2001						
(Federal Republic of Yugoslavia) Zvonko Varga	January 2002	November 2002						
(North Macedonia) Boško Đurovski	November 2002	May 2003						
(Serbia and Montenegro) Milan Milanović	May 2003	January 2004						
(Serbia and Montenegro) Zdravko Zemunović	January 2004	June 2004						
(Serbia and Montenegro) Radmilo Ivančević	June 2004	June 2005						
(Serbia and Montenegro) Čedomir Đoinčević	June 2005	September 2005						
(Serbia and Montenegro) Bogdan Korak	September 2005	June 2006						
(Serbia) Dragan Kecman	July 2006	October 2006						
(Serbia) Aleksandar Janjić	October 2006	June 2007						
(Serbia) Nebojša Vignjević	June 2007	August 2007						
(Serbia) Dragan Kecman	September 2007	December 2007						
(Serbia) Mihailo Ivanović	January 2008	April 2008						
(Serbia) Aleksandar Janjić	April 2008	October 2008						
(Serbia) Marko Nikolić	October 2008	May 2011						
(Serbia) Predrag Rogan (caretaker)	May 2011	May 2011						
(Serbia) Slavko Petrović	May 2011	September 2011						
(Serbia) Milan Bosanac (caretaker)	September 2011	October 2011						
(Serbia) Nebojša Vignjević	October 2011	February 2012						
(Serbia) Radoje Smiljanić (caretaker)	February 2012	March 2012						
(Serbia) Marko Nikolić	March 2012	June 2013						
(Serbia) Nebojša Milošević	June 2013	October 2013						
(Serbia) Nebojša Petrović	November 2013	December 2013						
(Serbia) Aleksandar Janković	December 2013	March 2014						
(Serbia) Stevan Mojsilović	March 2014	May 2014						
(Serbia) Slađan Nikolić (caretaker)	June 2014	June 2014						
(Serbia) Milan Milanović	July 2014	April 2016						
(Serbia) Slađan Nikolić (caretaker)	April 2016	May 2016						
(Serbia) Aleksandar Janjić	June 2016	August 2016						
(Serbia) Slađan Nikolić (caretaker)	August 2016	August 2016						
(Serbia) Nebojša Petrović	August 2016	June 2017						
(Serbia) Gordan Petrić	June 2017	October 2017						
(Serbia) Slađan Nikolić	October 2017	February 2018						
(Serbia) Zoran Milinković	February 2018	November 2018						
(Serbia) Srđan Stojčevski (caretaker)	November 2018	November 2018						
(Serbia) Dragan Stevanović	November 2018	February 2019						
(Serbia) Zvezdan Milošević	February 2019	April 2019						
(Serbia) Bogdan Korak	April 2019	August 2019						
(Serbia) Srđan Stojčevski (caretaker)	August 2019	August 2019						
(Montenegro) Dragan Radojičić	August 2019	December 2019						
(Serbia) Marko Mićović	December 2019	June 2020						
(Serbia) Branko Mirjačić	June 2020	September 2020						
(Serbia) Zoran Njeguš	September 2020	October 2020						
(Serbia) Milan Milanović	October 2020	May 2021						
(Serbia) Dragan Ivanović	June 2021	September 2021						
(Serbia) Zoran Rendulić	September 2021	March 2022						
(Serbia) Branko Mirjačić	March 2022	September 2022						
(Serbia) Bogdan Korak	September 2022	December 2022						
(Serbia) Igor Savić	January 2023	April 2023						
(Serbia) Goran Serafimović	April 2023	2023						
(Serbia) Dejan Musović	2023	2024						
(Serbia) Bogdan Korak	August 2024							
