= List of FK Zemun managers =

FK Zemun is a professional football club based in Zemun, Serbia.

== Managers ==
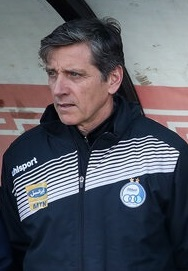
Nebojša Miličić

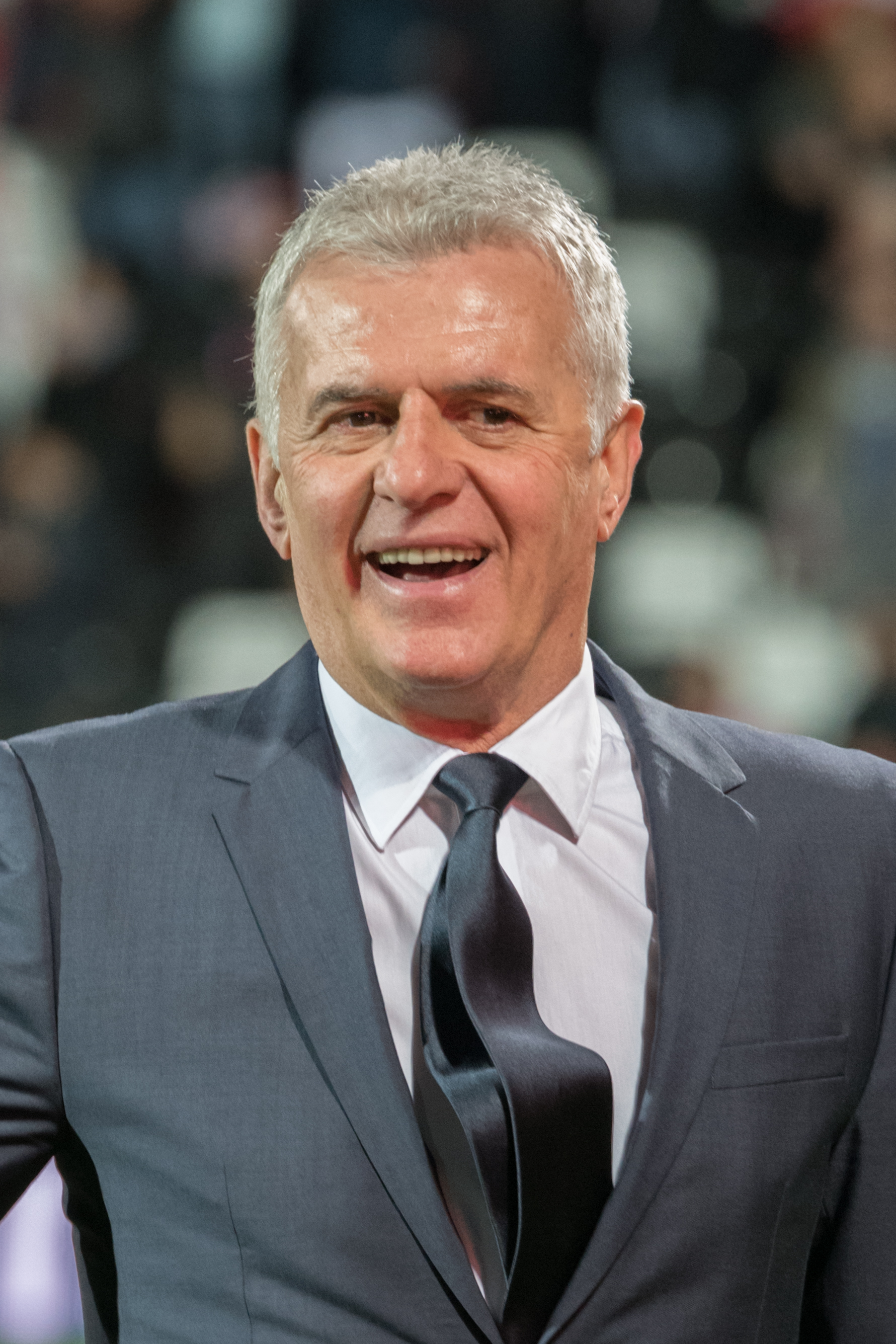
Miodrag Martać

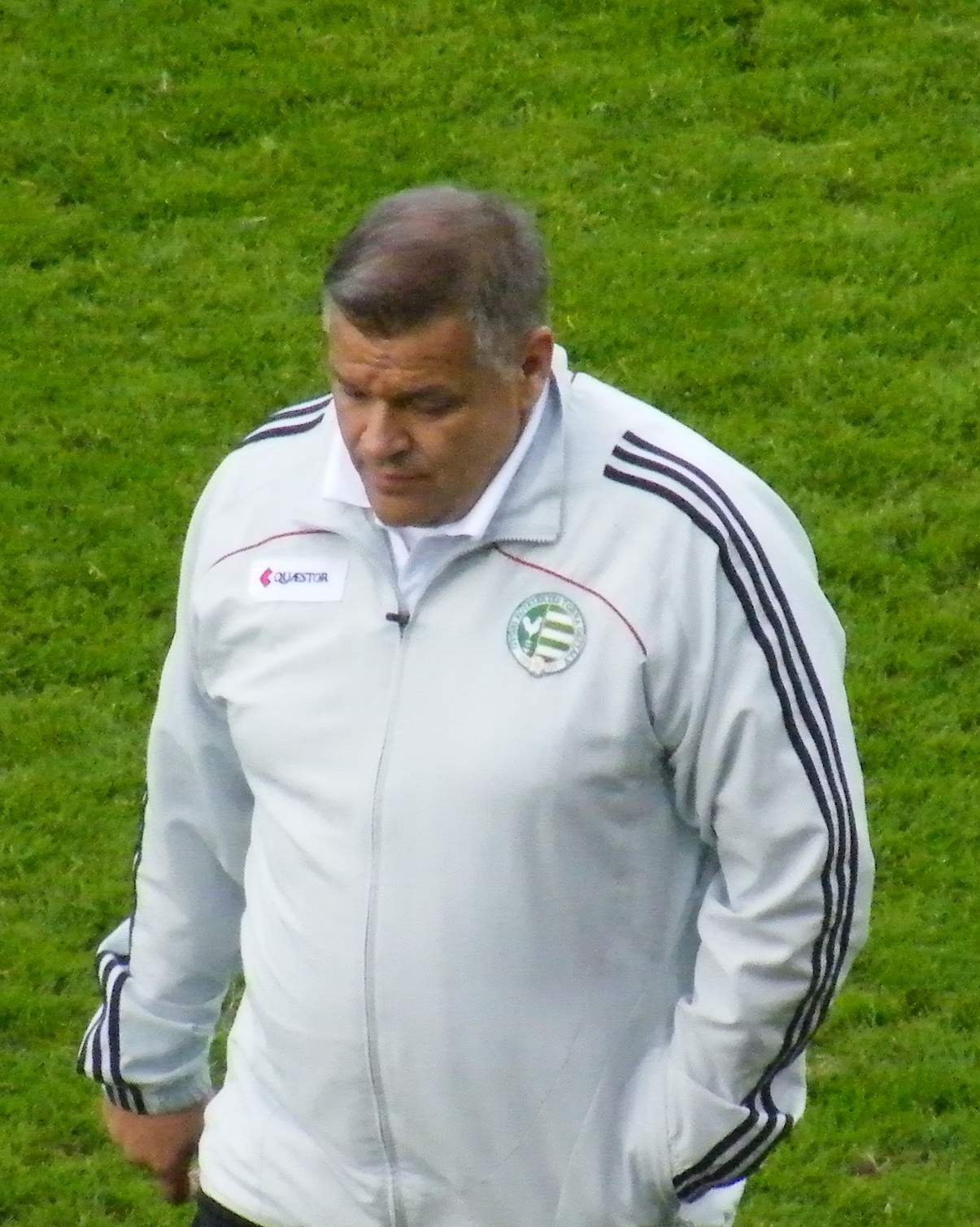
Dragoljub Bekvalac

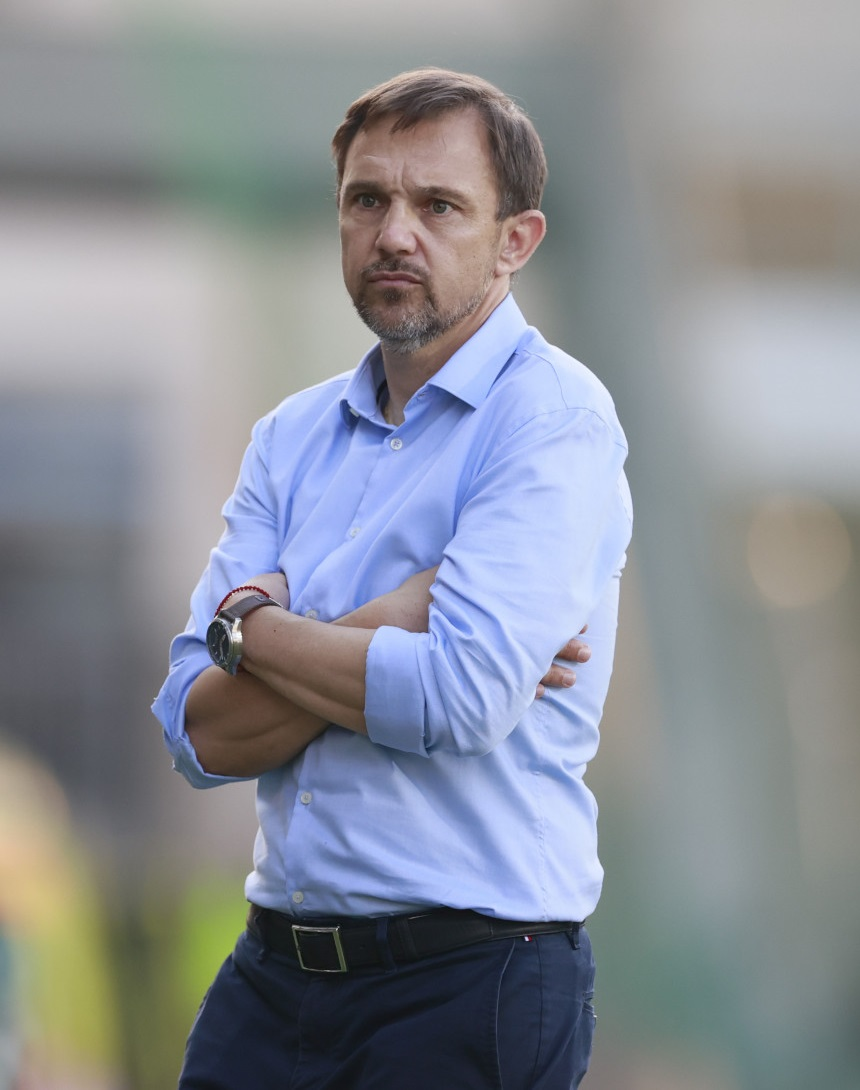
Predrag Rogan

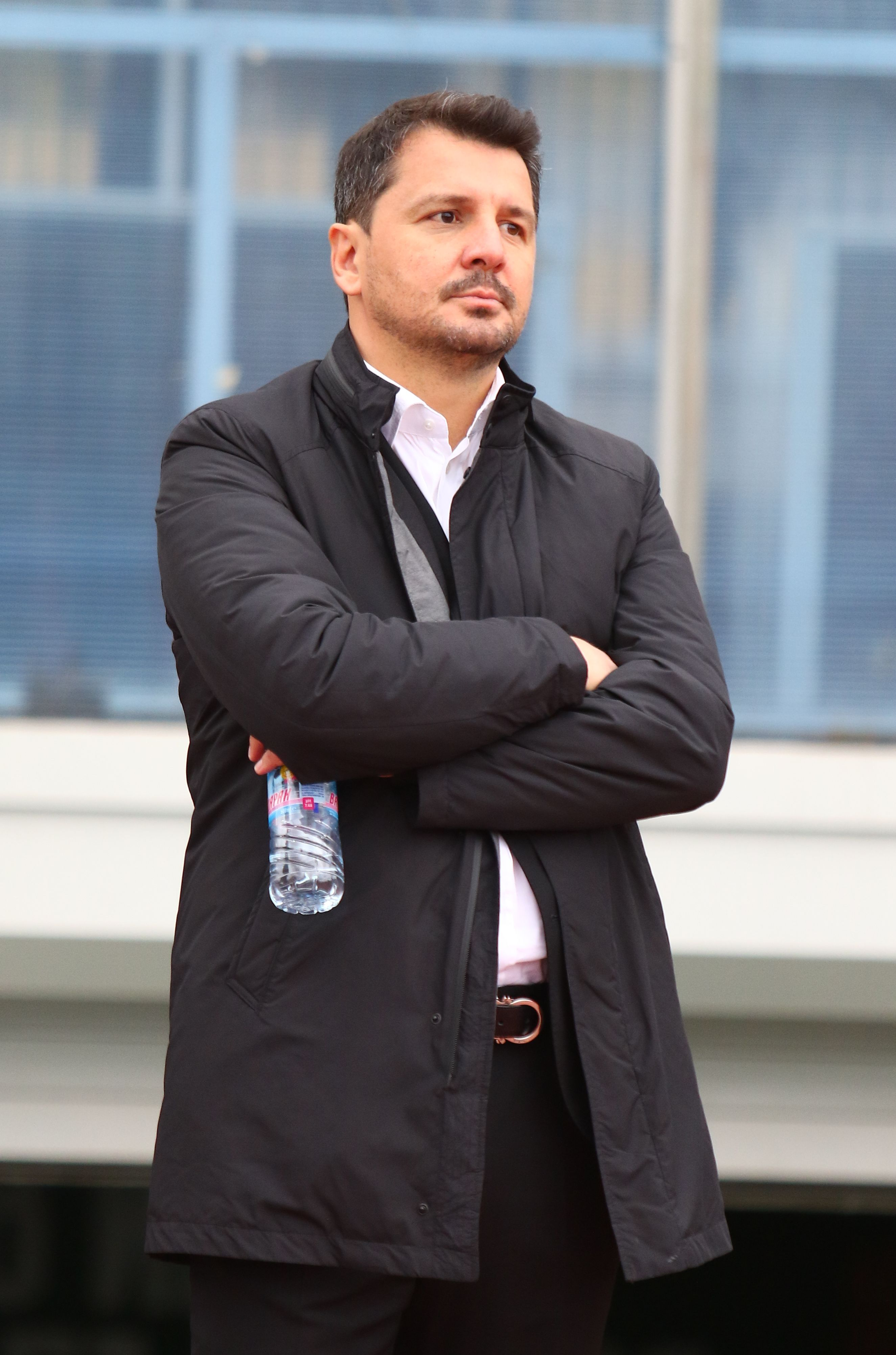
Miloš Kruščić

Name	Period		Pld	W	D	L	Win %	Honours
Name	From	To	Pld	W	D	L	Win %	Honours
(Socialist Federal Republic of Yugoslavia) Mile Kos								
(Socialist Federal Republic of Yugoslavia) Kosta Tomašević								
(Socialist Federal Republic of Yugoslavia) Ljubiša Arsenović	1964	1965						
(Socialist Federal Republic of Yugoslavia) Miodrag Petrović	1965	1968						
(Socialist Federal Republic of Yugoslavia) Mladen Sarić	1968	1968						
(Socialist Federal Republic of Yugoslavia) Miloš Grujić	1969	1970						
(Socialist Federal Republic of Yugoslavia) Stjepan Bobek	1970	1972						
(Socialist Federal Republic of Yugoslavia) Mladen Sarić	1972	1972						
(Socialist Federal Republic of Yugoslavia) Miroslav Milovanović	1972	1973						
(Socialist Federal Republic of Yugoslavia) Stjepan Bobek	1973	1974						
(Socialist Federal Republic of Yugoslavia) Ivan Čabrinović	1974	1983						1981–82 Yugoslav Second League (Group East)
(Socialist Federal Republic of Yugoslavia) Miljenko Mihić	1983	1983						
(Socialist Federal Republic of Yugoslavia) Nedeljko Kostić	1983	1984						
(Socialist Federal Republic of Yugoslavia) Ratomir Dujković	July 1984	October 1985						
(Socialist Federal Republic of Yugoslavia) Ljubiša Arsenović	October 1985	1986						
(Socialist Federal Republic of Yugoslavia) Mile Tomić	1986	1988						
(Socialist Federal Republic of Yugoslavia) Vlada Pejović	1988	1991						1989–90 Yugoslav Second League
(Socialist Federal Republic of Yugoslavia) Đorđe Gerum	1991	1992						
(Federal Republic of Yugoslavia) Mile Tomić	1992	1994						
(Federal Republic of Yugoslavia) Vlada Pejović	1994	1994						
(Federal Republic of Yugoslavia) Dragan Lacmanović	1994	1994						
(Federal Republic of Yugoslavia) Vlada Pejović	1994	1994						
(Federal Republic of Yugoslavia) Đorđe Gerum	1994	1995						
(Federal Republic of Yugoslavia) Jovan Kovrlija	1995	June 1997						
(Federal Republic of Yugoslavia) Dimitrije Mitrović	June 1997	1997						
(Federal Republic of Yugoslavia) Ivan Čabrinović	September 1997	1998						
(Federal Republic of Yugoslavia) Mile Tomić	1998	1999						
(Federal Republic of Yugoslavia) Goran Kalušević	1999	1999						
(Federal Republic of Yugoslavia) Milan Milanović	1999	November 2000						
(Federal Republic of Yugoslavia) Nebojša Miličić	November 2000	2001						
(Federal Republic of Yugoslavia) Ivan Čabrinović	2001	2001						
(Federal Republic of Yugoslavia) Milovan Mitić	July 2001	2001						
(Federal Republic of Yugoslavia) Miloljub Ostojić	November 2001	December 2001						
(Federal Republic of Yugoslavia) Bogić Bogićević	January 2002	2002						
(Federal Republic of Yugoslavia) Mihailo Ivanović	2002	December 2002						
(Federal Republic of Yugoslavia) Čedomir Đoinčević	December 2002	June 2003						
(Serbia and Montenegro) Miloljub Ostojić	June 2003	December 2003						
(Serbia and Montenegro) Dušan Mitošević	January 2004	November 2004						
(Serbia and Montenegro) Miodrag Martać	December 2004	August 2006						
(Serbia) Gezim Ljalja (caretaker)	2006	2006						
(Serbia) Dragan Lacmanović	October 2006	November 2006						
(Serbia) Milija Brkić (caretaker)	November 2006	December 2006						
(Serbia) Miloljub Ostojić	December 2006	April 2007						
(Serbia) Dragan Lacmanović	April 2007	September 2007						
(Serbia) Milan Đuričić	September 2007	December 2007						
(Serbia) Slobodan Kustudić	January 2008	2008						2007–08 Serbian Cup runners-up
(Serbia) Dragan Macura	2008	October 2009						2008–09 Serbian League Belgrade
(Serbia) Slobodan Kustudić	October 2009	2010						
(Serbia) Radmilo Jovanović	2011	2011						
(Serbia) Slobodan Milinković	2011	2011						
(Serbia) Dragan Stevanović	2011	2013						
(Serbia) Ivan Đurović (caretaker)	2013	April 2013						
(Serbia) Milan Milijaš	April 2013	2014						
(Serbia) Predrag Rogan	2014	2015						2014–15 Serbian League Belgrade
(Serbia) Gordan Petrić	June 2015	October 2015						
(Serbia) Nebojša Milošević	October 2015	December 2015						
(Serbia) Nebojša Maksimović	2016	2016						
(Serbia) Dragoljub Bekvalac	June 2016	August 2016						
(Serbia) Milan Milanović	August 2016	August 2018						
(Serbia) Dragoslav Milenković (caretaker)	August 2018	August 2018						
(Serbia) Miloš Kruščić	August 2018	November 2018						
(Serbia) Dejan Đurđević	November 2018	April 2019						
(Serbia) Radomir Koković	April 2019	May 2019						
(Serbia) Ratko Dostanić	June 2019	October 2019						
(Serbia) Saša Štrbac	October 2019	November 2019						
(Serbia) Milovan Mitić (caretaker)	November 2019	December 2019						
(Serbia) Milan Ristić	December 2019	December 2020						
(Serbia) Milan Kuljić	January 2021	February 2021						
(Serbia) Željko Kalajdžić	2021	2021						
(Serbia) Dragoslav Milenković	July 2021	May 2022						
(Serbia) Vladan Vuković	May 2022	2022						
(Serbia) Saša Kljajić	June 2022	October 2022						
(Serbia) Saša Štrbac	October 2022	June 2023						
(Montenegro) Nikola Drinčić	June 2023	April 2024						
(Serbia) Milan Kuljić	April 2024	June 2024						2023–24 Serbian League Belgrade
(Serbia) Dejan Nikolić	June 2024	October 2024						
(Serbia) Milan Kuljić	October 2024							
