= Saša Raca =

Bosnian Serb footballer

Personal information
- Full name: Saša Raca
- Date of birth: 9 May 1975 (age 51)
- Place of birth: SFR Yugoslavia
- Height: 1.81 m (5 ft 11 1/2 in)
- Position: Midfielder

Youth career
- 1984–1992: Kozara Gradiška

Senior career*
Years	Team	Apps	(Gls)
1992–1996	Kozara Gradiška		
1996–1997	Mladost Apatin		
1997–2000	Zemun	51+	(8)
2001–2002	Shanghai Shenhua		
2002	Zemun	8	(0)
2003–2004	Ethnikos Achna		
2004–2005	APOEL	3	(0)
2006–2008	Kozara Gradiška		
- * Club domestic league appearances and goals as of May 20, 2010

Saša Raca (born 9 May 1975) is a retired Bosnian Serb football midfielder who, after finishing his career, spent some time as sports director at the major football club at his hometown and later opened a football academy.

== Playing career ==
=== Club ===
He loved to play football from an early age, and when he was nine years old, he was spotted by local regional legend Velimir Sombolac who brought him to FK Kozara Gradiška where he was incorporated into the youth team. Raca would successfully climb all age levels making his debut for the first team at the age of 17. His first highlight came in 1994 when coach Borče Sredojević under extremely harsh circumstances managed to create an ideal synergy of youth and experience and made Raca win his first major title, the 1993–94 Republika Srpska Cup. This drew attention from other major regional clubs towards these players.

Two years later, Raca received a call from maximally ambitious FK Obilić, a club at the time owned by Željko Ražnjatović Arkan who had decided to turn a lower-league club in a succession of promotions to a national champion in record time. However, although Raca did move to Serbia, he signed with a third tier club, FK Mladost Apatin. His performance during the year and a half in Apatin did not pass unnoticed with Raca being rumoured to move to giants Red Star and Partizan Belgrade. Circumstances make Raca join FK Zemun, a stable club with plenty of tradition. By his own words, it ended being the best decision as he had the chance to be at the club when a great group of players were together and were all lucky to have been coached by names such as Mile Tomić, Ivan Čabrinović, Milan Milanović, Bogić Bogićević, Čedo Đoinčević, and others. Raca played over 100 official games for Zemun. After two years in Zemun some foreign clubs had shown interest in signing him, mostly Europeans, but Raca turned totally to the opposite direction after Serbian coach Ljupko Petrović convinced him to join him in Chinese side Shanghai Shenhua.

Chinese football was already rising at that time when Raca signed a one-year contract which was further extended one more year. Raca happily accepted since coincidentally the departure of coach Petrović in between seasons had brought another Serbian coach, also well known, Ilija Petković. What Raca found most impressive in China is that all games had between 30 and 70 thousand spectators.

When the two-year contract expired. Raca returned to Serbia and rejoined FK Zemun. However, after only a six months, he received a call from Svetozar Šapurić who was coaching Ethnikos Achna in Cyprus and wanted him in his team. After a good season, he received an offer from APOEL FC coached back then by Ivica Jovanović. However, after a good start, Raca suffered a serious knee-injury which demanded 3 surgeries and a year out of action. This was devastating for Raca which despite following strictly the medical recommendations to fully recover as soon as possible, once recovered he declined some offers he had as doctors were clear claiming any further injury could have a heavy impact on his life.

Feeling homesick, Raca returns to Republika Srpska, Bosnia and Herzegovina, and helps his original club, Kozara, which was going through some rough times. Without risking too much physically, it is his technique, experience, and leadership attitude that were useful to the club to impose some discipline in the squad. Raca still played actively for two full seasons with Kozara before deciding to retire for good.

== Post-playing career ==
Immediately after retiring he accepted to stay with the club and became sports director. However, different ideas and concepts between him and the club board made Raca resign after only 6 months, and he then started his own project, football school called FK Stars.

In 2017 he seems to be a managing director at FK Laktaši.
