= Vladimir Đilas =

Serbian footballer

vladimir djilas
Personal information
- Date of birth: 3 March 1983 (age 43)
- Place of birth: Belgrade, SFR Yugoslavia
- Height: 1.90 m (6 ft 3 in)
- Position: Striker

Senior career*
Years	Team	Apps	(Gls)
2001–2003	Bežanija	5	(0)
2004	BPI Pekar	12	(2)
2005–2006	Bregalnica Štip	40	(13)
2006	Marek Dupnitsa	14	(7)
2007–2008	Lokomotiv Sofia	44	(8)
2009–2011	Jagodina	63	(18)
2011	Aktobe	13	(5)
2012	Ordabasy	16	(1)
2013	Voždovac	29	(9)
2014	Metalac Gornji Milanovac	9	(2)
2014	Radnički Niš	8	(3)
2015	Ergotelis	13	(3)
2015	Panachaiki	11	(2)
2016	Borac Banja Luka	7	(0)
2016–2018	Partizan	2	(0)
2017	→ Teleoptik (loan)	10	(2)
2018	Jedinstvo Surčin	10	(6)
2019	Radnički Nova Pazova	15	(6)
2019–2021	Radnički Niš	3	(0)
2021	Brodarac	0	(0)
- * Club domestic league appearances and goals as of 27 February 2020

Vladimir Đilas (Serbian Cyrillic: Bлaдимиp Ђилac; also transliterated Vladimir Djilas; born 3 March 1983) is a Serbian football forward.

== Club career ==
Born in Belgrade, Đilas started his career with Bežanija, where he played between 2001 and 2003. Later he spent the whole 2004 playing with BPI Pekar, before he joined Bregalnica Štip at the beginning of 2005. After a season-and-a-half playing with club, he moved to Bulgaria and Marek Dupnitsa where he stayed until the end of 2006. He also spent next two years at the same county playing with Lokomotiv Sofia. Returning in Serbia, Đilas joined Jagodina at the beginning of 2009, and stayed with club until the summer 2011, when he left to the Kazakhstan Premier League side Aktobe. During the time he spent with Jagodina, he had been scouted by Roma. At the beginning of 2013, Đilas moved to Voždovac from Ordabasy and stayed with as the club captain until the end of same year when he left the club. Later he played with Metalac Gornji Milanovac, Radnički Niš, Ergotelis, Panachaiki, and Borac Banja Luka until the summer 2016. In last days of the summer transfer window 2016, Đilas officially signed a one-year contract with Partizan, but stayed out of the first squad, training with Teleoptik until the winter break off-season. After he spent the winter break off-season with the first team, he was licensed for the spring half of the Serbian SuperLiga with jersey number 8. In summer 2017, Đilas extended his contract with Partizan for a year. On last day of the summer transfer window 2017, Đilas moved on six-month loan deal to Teleoptik.

== Career statistics ==
As of 25 November 2017

Appearances and goals by club, season and competition
Club	Season	League			Cup		Continental		Other		Total	
Club	Season	Division	Apps	Goals	Apps	Goals	Apps	Goals	Apps	Goals	Apps	Goals
Bežanija	2001–02	Second League of Serbia and Montenegro	1	0	—		—		—		1	0
Bežanija	2002–03	Serbian League Belgrade	—		—		—		—		—	
Bežanija	2003–04	Second League of Serbia and Montenegro	4	0	—		—		—		4	0
Bežanija	Total		5	0	—		—		—		5	0
BPI Pekar	2003–04	Belgrade Zone League	—		—		—		—		—	
BPI Pekar	2004–05	Serbian League Belgrade	12	2	—		—		—		12	2
BPI Pekar	Total		12	2	—		—		—		12	2
Bregalnica	2004–05	Macedonian First Football League	13	7	—		—		—		13	7
Bregalnica	2005–06	Macedonian First Football League	27	6	—		—		—		27	6
Bregalnica	Total		40	13	—		—		—		40	13
Marek	2006–07	Bulgarian A Football Group	14	7	—		—		—		14	7
Lokomotiv Sofia	2006–07	Bulgarian A Football Group	7	3	—		—		—		7	3
Lokomotiv Sofia	2007–08	Bulgarian A Football Group	24	3	—		3	1	—		27	4
Lokomotiv Sofia	2008–09	Bulgarian A Football Group	13	2	—		2	0	—		15	2
Lokomotiv Sofia	Total		44	8	—		5	1	—		49	9
Jagodina	2008–09	Serbian SuperLiga	14	6	—		—		—		14	6
Jagodina	2009–10	Serbian SuperLiga	24	6	1	0	—		—		25	6
Jagodina	2010–11	Serbian SuperLiga	25	6	1	2	—		—		26	8
Jagodina	Total		63	18	2	2	—		—		65	20
Aktobe	2011	Kazakhstan Premier League	13	5	—		4	1	—		17	6
Ordabasy	2012	Kazakhstan Premier League	16	1	1	1	4	0	—		21	2
Voždovac	2012–13	Serbian First League	17	8	—		—		—		17	8
Voždovac	2013–14	Serbian SuperLiga	12	1	1	0	—		—		13	1
Voždovac	Total		29	9	1	0	—		—		30	9
Metalac Gornji Milanovac	2013–14	Serbian First League	9	2	—		—		—		9	2
Radnički Niš	2014–15	Serbian SuperLiga	8	3	2	0	—		—		10	3
Ergotelis	2014–15	Super League Greece	13	3	—		—		—		13	3
Panachaiki	2015–16	Football League	11	2	2	0	—		—		13	2
Borac Banja Luka	2015–16	Premier League of Bosnia and Herzegovina	7	0	1	0	—		—		8	0
Partizan	2016–17	Serbian SuperLiga	2	0	0	0	—		—		2	0
Partizan	2017–18	Serbian SuperLiga	0	0	0	0	—		—		0	0
Partizan	Total		2	0	0	0	—		—		2	0
Teleoptik (loan)	2017–18	Serbian First League	10	2	—		—		—		10	2
Career total			296	75	9	3	13	2	—		318	80

== Honours ==
Partizan

- Serbian SuperLiga: 2016–17
- Serbian Cup: 2016–17, 2017–18
