= FK BSK Borča =

BSK Borča
- Full name: Fudbalski klub BSK Borča
- Nickname: Borčani (The People from Borča)
- Founded: 1 April 1937; 89 years ago
- Ground: Vizelj park
- Capacity: 2,500
- President: Dragomir Vasić
- Head coach: Goran Janković
- League: Belgrade First League
- 2024–25: Belgrade First League, 11th
- Website: Official
Home colours	Away colours

Fudbalski klub BSK Borča (Serbian Cyrillic: Фудбалски клуб БСК Борча) is a Serbian football club from Borča, City of Belgrade. It is the football club of the Sports Society BSK Borča, BSK stands for Borčanski sportski klub meaning "Sports Society of Borča".

== History ==
BSK Borča football club was founded in April, 1937, and played its first official match on May 6, that same year, against Bačko Petrovo Selo, a 4–2 win. It ceased its activities during the Second World War and was reestablished in 1947. For a short period it changed its name to Hajduk and ceased its activities in 1951. Two years later, in 1953, it is reestablished as BSK and has been competing ever since.

The club's worst seasons since its founding were between 1990 and 1992, when it dropped from the Belgrade Zone League to First Division Belgrade, and lastly to the Second Division Belgrade, the lowest category of the competition.

Former club crest

The arrival of new leadership in the mid-1990s and, as of 2003, the new investments into the club have significantly contributed to the club's expansion into a major sports organization. The club's ascent started in 1993, with the arrival of Dragomir Vasić, the owner of Bami company. He stabilized the club financially and had the club's stadium capacity extended to additional 1.000 seats. The club has gradually started moving up, from First Division Belgrade to Belgrade Zone League and next to Serbian League North before being promoted to the Second League of FR Yugoslavia in 1998. They played in the second national level until 2002, when, due to the league reorganisation, they ceded their place to FK Vrbas and BSK was relegated to the Serbian League Belgrade where they played until 2006.

They were promoted to the Serbian First League in 2006, and immediately in their first two seasons, 2006–07 and 2007–08, the club headed into play-offs for the Serbian SuperLiga. After failing in those two occasions, it will be in their third attempt, after finishing first in the 2008–09 season that they won promotion to the Serbian SuperLiga. As the club stadium did not fulfill the criteria for playing in the SuperLiga, BSK played their first two seasons in the higher tier on OFK Beograd home ground, the Omladinski Stadium. In their first season in SuperLiga, BSK finished 12th. They were relegated after the 2012/13 season.

== Recent league history ==
Season	Division	P	W	D	L	F	A	Pts	Pos
2020–21	Serbian League Belgrade	38	15	9	14	57	51	54	13th
2021–22	Serbian League Belgrade	30	13	3	14	46	46	42	8th
2022–23	Serbian League Belgrade	30	6	14	10	27	33	23 (Note: The club was docked nine points.)	15th
2023–24	Belgrade Zone League	30	5	4	21	26	75	10 (Note: The club was docked nine points.)	15th
2024–25	Belgrade First League	26	5	4	17	36	83	19	11th

== Stadium ==
Home field of BSK Borča is Vizelj park with 2,500 seats, and it was first inaugurated in 1958. There is a project under way which started in April 2009 and that will expand the stadium capacity to 8,000 seats, divided in four stands.

The club has a sports complex which includes 4 grass fields (the main one plus 3 auxiliary ones), a sports hall, and a restaurant with 300 seats and 16 luxury rooms. The club's reorganization and new infrastructure were possible thanks to the efforts of Obrad Ćesarević and Dragomir Vasić, who both try to keep the club and its professional team in fine standing.

== Supporters ==
The supporters of BSK Borča are known as Borča Company (Serbian: Компанија Борча/Kompanija Borča). They were formed by fusion of few smaller groups – Beton Boys, Olosh Boys, LDK C-2 and Shakal Squad.

== Honours and achievements ==
- Serbian First League
  - Winners (1): 2008–09
- Serbian League Belgrade
  - Winners (1): 2005–06

== Notable former players ==
To appear in this section a player must have either:

- Played at least 80 games for the club.
- Set a club record or won an individual award while at the club.
- Played at least one international match for their national team at any time.
- (Bosnia and Herzegovina) Nebojša Pejić
- (Bosnia and Herzegovina) Borislav Topić
- (Serbia) Aleksandar Đukić
- (Serbia) Zoran Knežević
- (Serbia) Predrag Lazić
- (Serbia) Novak Martinović
- (Serbia) Vladimir Matić
- (North Macedonia) Perica Stančeski
- (Montenegro) Asmir Kajević
- (Montenegro) Šaleta Kordić
- (Montenegro) Mitar Novaković
- (Montenegro) Stefan Savić
- (Montenegro) Vladimir Volkov

For the list of all former and current players with Wikipedia article, please see: Category:FK BSK Borča players.

== Historical list of coaches ==
- (Serbia and Montenegro) Nebojša Vignjević
- (Serbia and Montenegro) Bogdan Korak (2003)
- (Serbia) Zoran Milinković (2005 – June 2008)
- (Serbia) Veličko Kaplanović (July 2008 – June 2009)
- (North Macedonia) Šefki Arifovski (July 2009 – April 2010)
- (Serbia) Miodrag Radanović (April 2010 – 2010)
- (Serbia) Srđan Vasiljević (June 2010 – September 2010)
- (Serbia) Milenko Kiković (September 2010 – June 2011)
- (Kosovo) (Turkey) Naci Şensoy (July 2011 – August 2011)
- (Serbia) Saša Milanović (August 2011 – January 2012)
- (Serbia) Veličko Kaplanović (January 2012 – June 2012)
- (Serbia) Goran Milojević (July 2012 – December 2012)
- (Serbia) Nebojša Milošević (December 2012 – May 2013)
- (Serbia) Miodrag Radanović (2013)
- (Serbia) Momčilo Raičević (2013)
- (Serbia) Dragan Aničić (2013–14)
- (Serbia) Predrag Marić (2014)
- (Serbia) Dragan Aničić (2015)
- (Serbia) Milan Bosanac (2015)
- (Serbia) Dragan Aničić (2015–16)
- (Serbia) Predrag Pejović (Nov 2016–2017)
- (Serbia) Dragan Lacmanović (2017)
- (Serbia) Igor Savić (2017)
- (Serbia) Nebojša Petrović (2018)
- (Serbia) Alen Tupajić (2019)
- (Serbia) Slaven Kovačević (2020)
- (Serbia) Stanislav Zvezdić (Oct 2020 - Mar 21)
- (Serbia) Goran Janković (Mar 2021 - Dec 21)
- (Serbia) Stanislav Zvezdić (Jan 2022 -)
- (Serbia) Goran Janković

== Kit manufacturers and shirt sponsors ==
Period	Kit Manufacturer	Shirt Sponsor
2010–present	Hummel	
