= Đorđe Kunovac =

Bosnian-Herzegovinian footballer (born 1975)

Personal information
- Date of birth: 8 June 1975 (age 51)
- Place of birth: Mostar, SFR Yugoslavia
- Height: 1.81 m (5 ft 11 in)
- Position: Midfielder

Youth career
- Velež Mostar
- Rad

Senior career*
Years	Team	Apps	(Gls)
1995–1996	Bečej	30	(4)
1996–1998	Rad	63	(9)
1999–2000	Leotar		
2000–2001	Fortuna Düsseldorf	10	(0)
2001–2002	Rad	6	(0)
2002	Mogren	2	(0)
2003	Grbalj		
2003–2004	Sinđelić Beograd		

Managerial career
- 2008–2011: Sveti Stefan
- 2011–2011: Milutinac Zemun
- 2011–2012: Palilulac Beograd
- 2012–2012: Zmaj Zemun
- 2013–2013: Spartak Bánovce
- 2014–2016: Torlak
- 2016–2017: Avala
- 2017–: Sremčica
- * Club domestic league appearances and goals

Đorđe Kunovac (Serbian Cyrillic: ЂорЂе Куновац, born 8 June 1975) is a Bosnian-Herzegovinian football manager and former player.

== Playing career ==
Born in Trebinje, he began playing football in his home-town club FK Leotar. He was spotted there by FK Partizan who brought him to their youth team. He started playing as senior in the First League of FR Yugoslavia clubs FK Bečej and FK Rad. He played with Leotar in the First League of the Republika Srpska during until 2000, before coming to Germany to play in Fortuna Düsseldorf. Afterwards, he was back to Rad and in 2002 played for Montenegrin club FK Mogren before finishing his playing career in FK Sinđelić Beograd.

== Coaching career ==
He was the coach of a Belgrade-based Serbian club FK Sveti Stefan. For the 2011–12 season he was appointed as head coach of FK Milutinac Zemun. After a few months Kunovac resigned as coach of FK Milutinac Zemun and later that year he was appointed as manager of FK Palilulac Beograd. For the 2012–13 season he started as a head coach of a FK Zmaj Zemun, but again after a few months re-resigned. Second part of the 2012–13 season he worked again as a head coach in FK Milutinac Zemun, and played for the senior team. For the 2013–14 season he was appointed as a manager of Slovak side FK Spartak Bánovce nad Bebravou.

At the beginning of the 2014–15 season he took over managing Belgrade lower league club FK Torlak from Kumodraž. Torlak competes in 5th tier of Serbian football league system. In his first season as Torlak manager he won the league and got promoted to Belgrade Zone League (4th tier). He won the first tournament named Voždovac Trophy. In his second season the team won second Voždovac Trophy, and later that year fourth place on the end of the first part of the season, surprising everyone, which was expected by no one. FK Torlak style of play was recognizable in Belgrade at the time. Sadly, he resigned 3 rounds before end of the season due to differences with the club management. He was considered one of the best coaches in the league. After that he led newly-promoted FK Avala in their debut season 2016–17 in Belgrade Zone League. He got relegated due to poor quality in squad, and uninterested club management. He resigned at the end of the season. In the 2017–18 season he took the helm of FK Sremčica and a club from Belgrade Zone League. He completely rebuilt the squad prior to the season resulting poor displays in the first seven rounds. After that, everything got better and FK Sremčica won 4 matches plus 4 matches ended in a draw, which led to 10th place after the first part of the season.
