= Aničić =

Aničić (Cyrillic script: Аничић) is a South Slavic surname. Notable people with the surname include:

- Dragan Aničić (born 1970), Serbian football coach and former player
- Marin Aničić (born 1989), Bosnian footballer
- Michael Aničić (born 1974), German footballer
