= FK Srem Jakovo =

Serbian football club

Srem Jakovo
- Full name: Fudbalski Klub Srem Jakovo
- Founded: 1927; 99 years ago
- Ground: Stadion FK Srem
- Capacity: 1,617
- League: Belgrade First League – Group A
- 2024–25: Belgrade Intermunicipal League – Group A, 8th of 15
Home colours	Away colours

FK Srem Jakovo (Serbian Cyrillic: ФК Срем Јаково) is a football club based in Jakovo, Belgrade, Serbia.

== History ==
In the 2001–02 season, the club placed second in the Serbian League Belgrade. It earned promotion to the Second League of FR Yugoslavia. They would compete in Group North but finished bottom of the table in their only appearance in the second tier. The club subsequently suffered relegation from the Serbian League Belgrade in the 2003–04 season.

After winning the 2004–05 Belgrade Zone League, the club spent 11 consecutive seasons in the Serbian League Belgrade, the third tier of the national league pyramid. They also reached the round of 16 in the 2010–11 Serbian Cup, losing to Vojvodina on penalties.

=== Recent league history ===
Season	Division	P	W	D	L	F	A	Pts	Pos
2020–21	4 - Belgrade Zone League	32	11	7	14	39	55	40	10th
2021–22	5 - Belgrade First League	26	8	2	16	29	56	26	11th
2022–23	6 - Belgrade Intermunicipal League – Group A	24	3	2	19	27	85	11	13th
2023–24	6 - Belgrade Intermunicipal League – Group A	26	15	7	4	73	41	52	4th
2024–25	6 - Belgrade Intermunicipal League – Group A	28	13	2	13	62	70	41	8th

== Honours ==
- Belgrade Zone League (Tier 4)
  - 2004–05

== Notable players ==
This is a list of players who have played at full international level.

- (Montenegro) Darko Božović
- (Montenegro) Vladimir Rodić
- (Serbia) Miloš Bogunović
- (Serbia) Bojan Isailović
- (Serbia) Marko Jevtović

For a list of all FK Srem Jakovo players with a Wikipedia article, see Category:FK Srem Jakovo players.

== Historical list of coaches ==
- (Serbia) Mihajlo Bošnjak (2010–2011)
- (Serbia) Nenad Cvetković
- (Serbia) Srđan Blagojević (2012-2013)
- (Serbia) Goran Njamculović (2013)
- (Serbia) Srđan Blagojević (2013-2014)
- (Serbia) Žarko Lazetić (2014)
- (Serbia) Bogdan Korak (2014–2015)
- (Serbia) Dušan Jevrić (2015)
