= Vincent Ngongang =

Cameroonian footballer

Personal information
- Date of birth: January 9, 1979 (age 47)
- Place of birth: Bafoussam, Cameroon
- Height: 1.85 m (6 ft 1 in)
- Positions: Defensive midfielder; right back

Senior career*
Years	Team	Apps	(Gls)
1995–1997	Racing Bafoussam	36	(9)
1997–1999	Fortuna Düsseldorf		
1999–2001	FC Waidhofen/Ybbs		
2001–2004	BSK Batajnica		
2004–2006	Teleoptik		
2006–2009	Proleter Novi Sad		
2009–2012	Metalac Futog		
2012–2014	Borac Bivolje		
2014–2017	Crvenka		
- * Club domestic league appearances and goals

Vincent Ngongang (born 9 January 1979) is a former Cameroonian footballer.

== Career ==
He began his career playing for Racing Bafoussam alongside Geremi. After spells in Germany and Austria, he settled in Serbia where he played the remainder of his career. Since ending his playing career he has become youth team coach at FK Grafičar Beograd.
