= Goran Janković =

Serbian footballer

Personal information
- Date of birth: 12 December 1978 (age 47)
- Place of birth: Belgrade, SFR Yugoslavia
- Height: 1.90 m (6 ft 3 in)
- Position: Defensive midfielder

Senior career*
Years	Team	Apps	(Gls)
1996–2003	Rad	159	(18)
2003–2005	Radnički Beograd	60	(17)
2005–2006	GKS Bełchatów	17	(0)
2006–2007	UTA Arad	11	(0)
2007–2008	Čukarički	26	(1)
2008–2011	Minyor Pernik	71	(13)
2011–2015	Donji Srem	86	(9)
2015	Zemun		
2015–2016	Radnički Beograd		
2015–2017	Žarkovo		

Managerial career
- 2020–2021: Studentski Grad
- 2021: BSK Borča
- 2022: Prva Iskra Barič
- 2023: Studentski Grad
- 2023: Radnički Sremska Mitrovica
- * Club domestic league appearances and goals

Goran Janković (Serbian Cyrillic: Горан Јанковић; born 12 December 1978) is a Serbian professional football manager and former player who played as a midfielder.

== Early life and career ==
Janković was born in Belgrade, Serbia, SFR Yugoslavia and started his career at FK Rad. He spent seven seasons at the club, appearing in 159 matches and scoring 18 goals. After that, he played for FK Radnički Beograd and Polish club GKS Bełchatów.

FC UTA Arad was obligated to pay monthly 3.000 euro to Janković, transferred in July 2006, despite coach Marius Lacatus not wanting him at the team anymore. At the beginning of January, Lacatus announced Janković was not part of his plans anymore, and that he was free to look for another club. The Serbian underwent tests in Serbia, Ukraine and Russia and negotiated with CFR Timişoara and Unirea Alba-Iulia, but could not find an agreement. Because of that, Janković decided to respect he agreement with UTA, valid until 2008, and was sent to their second team, Gloria Arad, from Liga III. Because he attended training sessions and respecting the schedule, Janković couldn't be penalized and his contract couldn't be cancelled.

In June 2008, he signed with Bulgarian Minyor Pernik. After three seasons at Minyor Pernik, he joined Serbian FK Donji Srem on free transfer. In July 2015, as a free agent, he returned to his former club FK Radnički Beograd, now in the Serbian third league.
