= Nikola Šipčić =

Montenegrin footballer (born 1995)

Personal information
- Full name: Nikola Šipčić
- Date of birth: 17 May 1995 (age 31)
- Place of birth: Priboj, FR Yugoslavia
- Height: 1.92 m (6 ft 4 in)
- Position: Centre-back

Team information
- Current team: Asteras Tripolis
- Number: 3

Youth career
- FAP

Senior career*
Years	Team	Apps	(Gls)
2013	FAP		
2014	OFK Beograd	0	(0)
2014–2016	Žarkovo	46	(3)
2016–2019	Rad	62	(3)
2019–2025	Tenerife	138	(5)
2024–2025	→ Cartagena (loan)	21	(0)
2025–	Asteras Tripolis	21	(0)

International career^{‡}
2022–	Montenegro	23	(0)
- * Club domestic league appearances and goals as of 14 June 2026 ‡ National team caps and goals as of 17 November 2025

Nikola Šipčić (Montenegrin: Никола Шипчић; born 17 May 1995) is a Montenegrin professional footballer who plays as a defender for Greek Super League club Asteras Tripolis and the Montenegro national team.

== Club career ==
=== Early career ===
Born in Priboj, Šipčić started his career at the local club FAP. Playing as a senior, Šipčić appeared in the Drina Zone League as a bonus player until the end of 2013, when he left the club. At the beginning of 2014, Šipčić joined Serbian SuperLiga side OFK Beograd and passed the winter break off-season with the first team. After the end of 2013–14 Serbian SuperLiga season, when he overgrown youth selection, Šipčić left the club without official caps.

=== Rad ===
In summer 2014, Šipčić joined Rad reserves, Žarkovo. He stayed with the club for two seasons, scoring three goals on 46 matches in the Serbian League Belgrade. In summer 2016, Šipčić promoted in the first team and signed a three-year professional contract with Rad. He made his SuperLiga for Rad in 18 fixture match of the 2016–17 Serbian SuperLiga season against Radnički Niš, replacing injured Stevan Bates. Previously, he made an official debut for the club in a Serbian Cup match against Mladost Lučani, played on 26 October 2016. Through the first season in professional football, Šipčić made 4 competitive matches at total. During the 2017–18 Serbian SuperLiga campaign, Šipčić was also a part of the first squad under coaches Gordan Petrić, Slađan Nikolić and Zoran Milinković, making 25 appearances in both domestic competitions. In summer 2018, Šipčić extended his contract with Rad on a three-year deal until June 2021. Šipčić noted his first goal for Rad in 3rd fixture match of the 2018–19 Serbian SuperLiga campaign, scoring in 2–1 away victory over Vojvodina on 5 August 2018.

=== Tenerife ===
On 30 July 2019, Šipčić moved abroad and signed a three-year deal with Spanish Segunda División side CD Tenerife. On 21 July 2023, he renewed his contract until 2027,

On 7 July 2024, Šipčić was loaned to fellow second division side FC Cartagena, for one year.

== International career ==
Born in Priboj, Serbia, Šipčić is of Montenegrin descent. He was called up to represent the Montenegro national team for a set of friendlies in March 2022. On 24 March 2022, he debuted with Montenegro in a 1–0 friendly loss to Armenia on 24 March 2022.

== Career statistics ==
As of 26 July 2025

Appearances and goals by club, season and competition
Club	Season	League			Cup		Continental		Other		Total	
Club	Season	Division	Apps	Goals	Apps	Goals	Apps	Goals	Apps	Goals	Apps	Goals
Žarkovo	2014–15	Serbian League Belgrade	20	1	—		—		—		20	1
Žarkovo	2015–16	Serbian League Belgrade	26	2	—		—		3 (Note: Including Belgrade Cup matches against Stepojevac Vaga, Dorćol and Brodarac 1947)	0	29	2
Žarkovo	Total		46	3	—		—		3	0	49	3
Rad	2016–17	Serbian SuperLiga	3	0	1	0	—		—		4	0
Rad	2017–18	Serbian SuperLiga	23	0	2	0	—		—		25	0
Rad	2018–19	Serbian SuperLiga	35	3	0	0	—		—		35	3
Rad	2019–20	Serbian SuperLiga	1	0	0	0	—		—		1	0
Rad	Total		62	3	3	0	—		—		65	3
Tenerife	2019–20	Segunda División	25	3	4	0	—		—		29	3
Tenerife	2020–21	Segunda División	34	0	2	0	—		—		36	0
Tenerife	2021–22	Segunda División	32	1	2	0	—		—		34	1
Tenerife	2022–23	Segunda División	30	1	2	0	—		—		32	1
Tenerife	2023–24	Segunda División	17	0	2	0	—		—		19	0
Tenerife	Total		138	5	12	0	—		—		150	5
Cartagena (loan)	2024–25	Segunda División	21	0	2	0	—		—		23	0
Career total			267	11	17	0	0	0	3	0	287	11
