= FK Boleč =

- Full name: Fudbalski Klub Boleč
- Founded: 1958; 68 years ago
- Ground: Stadium Park Janka Gagica, Boleč, Belgrade Region
- Capacity: 800
- Chairman: Milovan Zupković
- Coach: Zoran Simov
- League: Belgrade First League
- 2024–25: Belgrade First League, 7th
Home colours	Away colours

Fudbalski klub Boleč (Serbian Cyrillic: Фудбалски клуб Болеч) is a Serbian amateur football club based in Belgrade, more precisely from the Boleč suburban neighborhood. The club currently competes in the Belgrade First League, in the 5th tier of Serbian football.

Founded in 1958 by an unknown group of people at Park "Janko Gagic", the club has become a symbol of Boleč's culture along with a small group of ultras known as "Stampedo Boleč" who are currently being led by a group of boys who are known for their pyrotechnic culture.

== History ==
The club was founded in 1958 where it would not show any local success until the 2013-14 where they were crowned champions of the Belgrade First League, qualifying for the Belgrade Zone League but were immediately relegated back into the Belgrade First League following their poor performance with only 22 points. In 2022, Boleč was crowned champion of the Belgrade First League once more with 65 points but would be relegated 2 years later after a 12 point deduction following a match-fixing scandal between Boleč and Zuce.

== Honours and achievements ==
- Second league of Belgrade - 6th rank

- Group "Šumadija" Winners (1): 2013

- Belgrade First League - 1st rank

- Group "C" Winners (2): 2013, 2022

== Recent league history ==
Season	Division	P	W	D	L	F	A	Pts	Pos
2020–21	Belgrade First League	24	11	5	8	49	36	38	5th
2021–22	Belgrade First League	24	21	2	1	87	15	65	1st
2022–23	Belgrade Zone Lge.	30	9	6	15	39	61	33	12th
2023–24	Belgrade Zone Lge.	30	9	3	18	36	74	18 (Note: The club was docked twelve points.)	13th
2024–25	Belgrade First League	26	11	4	11	65	53	37	7th
2025-26	Belgrade First League	26	13	5	8	61	46	44	3rd
