= FK Torlak =

- Full name: Fudbalski klub Torlak
- Short name: FK Torlak
- Founded: 1962; 64 years ago
- Ground: Stadion FK Torlak, Kumodraž, Voždovac, Belgrade
- Capacity: 300
- League: Serbian League Belgrade
- 2024-25: Belgrade Zone League, 1st (promoted)
Home colours

Fudbalski klub Torlak is a football club founded in 1962, located in Kumodraž, an urban neighborhood in the municipality of Voždovac, Belgrade, the capital of Serbia.

== Honours ==
- Voždovac Trophy: 2016, 2017
- Belgrade First League Group C: 2015
- Belgrade Third League Group B: 2011

== Supporters ==
The club has a small group of ardent supporters called Nomadi (which means Nomads), who form one of the groups at FK Rad. They have a fierce off-pitch rivalry with neighbours FK Voždovac.

== Recent league history ==
Season	Division	P	W	D	L	F	A	Pts	Pos
2020–21	4 - Belgrade Zone League	32	23	5	4	76	25	74	3rd
2021–22	4 - Belgrade Zone League	30	22	3	5	67	25	69	1st
2022–23	3 - Serbian League Belgrade	30	11	3	16	40	45	36	10th
2023–24	3 - Serbian League Belgrade	30	4	6	20	28	57	18	15th
2024–25	4 - Belgrade Zone League	26	21	5	0	76	10	68	1st

== Notable players and managers ==
Đorđe Kunovac, a former Yugoslav top-flight footballer, managed the club between 2014 and 2016.
