= FK Lisović 1977 =

Lisović
- Full name: Fudbalski Klub Lisović 1977
- Founded: 1977
- Ground: Stadion FK Lisović, Lisović
- Capacity: 390
- League: Belgrade First League Group C
- 2024-25: Belgrade First League Group C, 6th
Home colours	Away colours

FK Lisović 1977 is a Serbian football club based in Lisović, Serbia. As of the 2025-26 season they compete in the 5th-tier Belgrade First League.

== History ==
Football has been played in Lisovic since 1937. Then the teachers Jelace gathered some village boys and taught them rules of this game in the field of Bogosav Stanisavljevic, with the leather ball which was made by shoemaker Gose. In 2008 club achieved their greatest success, by clinching promotion to the third-tier Serbian League Belgrade. There Lisović played one season, but in summer 2009 they step down from the competition, so FK Resnik took their place.

=== Recent league history ===
Season	Division	P	W	D	L	F	A	Pts	Pos
2020–21	5 - Belgrade First League Group B	30	15	6	9	68	37	51	7th
2021–22	5 - Belgrade First League Group B	26	9	5	12	54	47	32	7th
2022–23	5 - Belgrade First League Group B	26	10	0	16	34	47	30	9th
2023–24	5 - Belgrade First League Group B	24	6	4	14	26	52	22	11th
2024–25	5 - Belgrade First League Group C	26	10	7	9	44	44	37	6th
