= Bojan Isailović =

Serbian footballer (born 1980)

Personal information
- Full name: Bojan Isailović
- Date of birth: 25 March 1980 (age 46)
- Place of birth: Belgrade, SR Serbia, SFR Yugoslavia
- Height: 1.92 m (6 ft 3 1/2 in)
- Position: Goalkeeper

Youth career
- Red Star Belgrade

Senior career*
Years	Team	Apps	(Gls)
2001–2005	Rad	11	(0)
2002–2003	→ Srem Jakovo (loan)	17	(0)
2005–2006	Sevojno	52	(0)
2007–2008	Čukarički	58	(0)
2009	Gençlerbirliği	15	(0)
2009	Čukarički	8	(0)
2010–2011	Zagłębie Lubin	51	(0)
Total		212	(0)

International career
2008–2010	Serbia	4	(0)
- * Club domestic league appearances and goals

Bojan Isailović (Serbian: Бојан Исаиловић, born 25 March 1980) is a Serbian former professional footballer who played as a goalkeeper. He represented Serbia at the 2010 FIFA World Cup.

== Club career ==
Isailović came through the youth ranks of Red Star Belgrade, before making his senior debut with Rad. He moved to Sevojno in late summer 2005, staying at the club for a year and a half. In 2007, Isailović transferred to Čukarički, immediately helping the club promotion to the top flight of Serbian football. He subsequently established himself as one of the best goalkeepers in the country before transferring to Turkish club Gençlerbirliği in the 2009 winter transfer window. After spending only one-and-a-half season in Turkey, Isailović returned to his former club Čukarički. He subsequently moved abroad again and joined Polish club Zagłębie Lubin in January 2010.

On 14 December 2008, Isailović made his international debut for Serbia in a 0–1 friendly loss against Poland. In June 2010, he was selected in Serbia's squad for the 2010 FIFA World Cup, but did not make any appearances. In 2010, Isailović played his final another friendly loss against Poland.
