= Borislav Topić =

Bosnian footballer

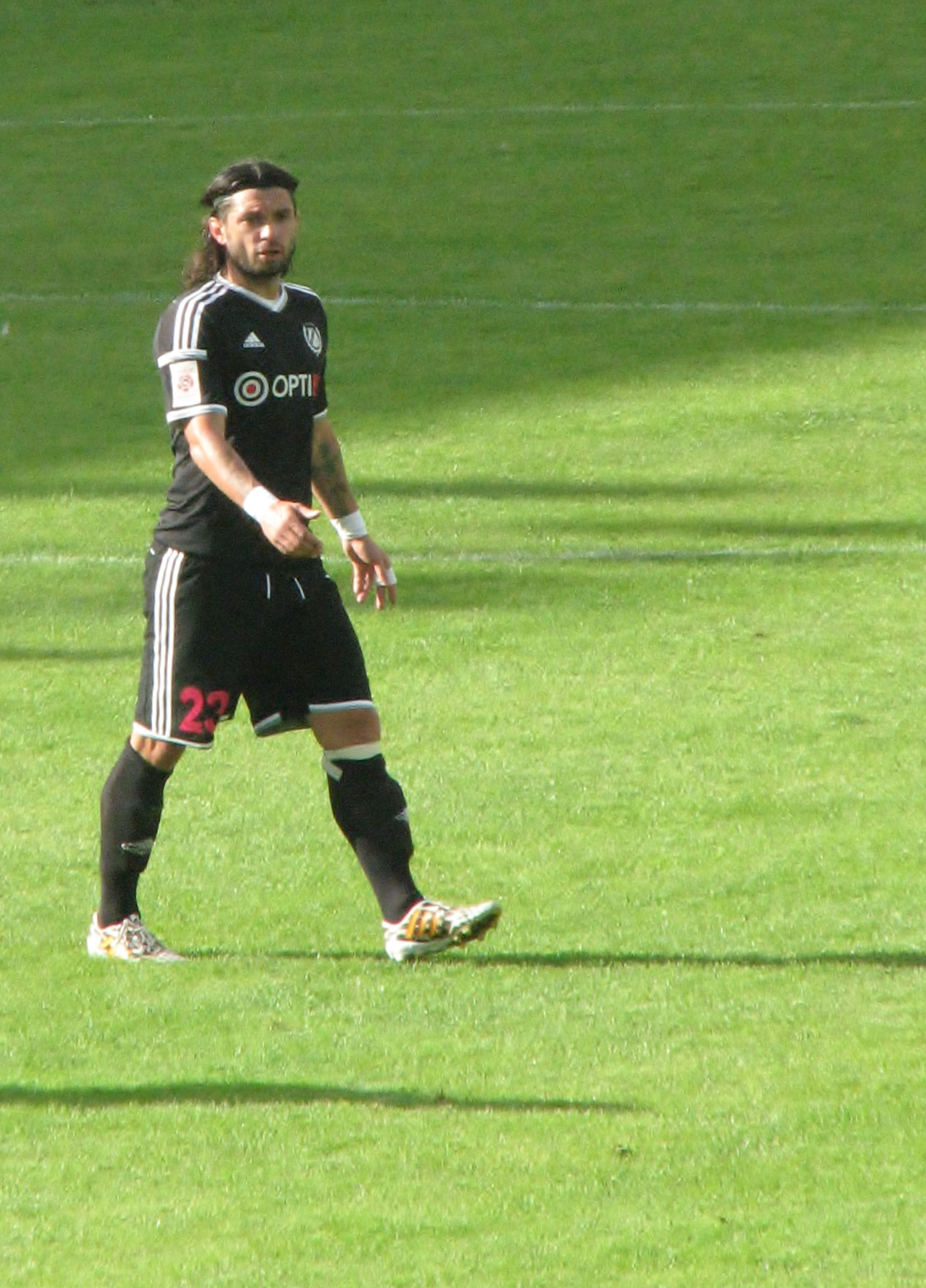

Personal information
- Full name: Borislav Topić
- Date of birth: 22 May 1984 (age 42)
- Place of birth: Prijedor, SFR Yugoslavia
- Height: 1.80 m (5 ft 11 in)
- Position: Left back

Senior career*
| Years | Team | Apps | (Gls) |
| 2002–2006 | Rudar Prijedor | | |
| 2006–2010 | BSK Borča | 95 | (5) |
| 2010–2012 | Târgu Mureş | 23 | (0) |
| 2012 | Rudar Prijedor | 6 | (0) |
| 2013 | Novi Pazar | 3 | (0) |
| 2014 | Jedinstvo Bihać | 23 | (6) |
| 2015–2016 | Nõmme Kalju | 10 | (0) |
| 2016–2017 | Jedinstvo Bihać | 28 | (5) |
| 2017 | ASU Politehnica | 4 | (0) |
| Total | | 192 | (16) |

International career
| 2002 | Bosnia and Herzegovina U-19 | 3 | (1) |
- * Club domestic league appearances and goals as of 6 November 2017

Borislav Topić (Serbian Cyrillic: Бopиcлaв Toпић, born 22 May 1984) is a Bosnian former football defender.

== Club career ==
Born in Prijedor he begin playing in his home-town club FK Rudar Prijedor where he played until 2006, when he moved to Serbia by signing with FK BSK Borča. After 4 seasons with BSK Borča, the first 3 playing in the Serbian First League and the last one at highest level, Serbian SuperLiga, he moved to Romania by signing with Liga I side FCM Târgu Mureș.

== International career ==
He was part of the Bosnia and Herzegovina U-19 team.

0Pplklpkko
