= FK Balkan Mirijevo =

Balkan Mirijevo
- Full name: Omladinski Fudbalski Klub Balkan Mirijevo
- Founded: 1926; 100 years ago
- Ground: , Belgrade
- Capacity: 1,000
- League: Belgrade First League Group A
- 2024–25: Belgrade First League, 2nd
Home colours	Away colours

OFK Balkan Mirijevo is a Serbian football club. The club currently competes in the Belgrade First League, in the 5th tier of Serbian football.

== History ==
In the seasons 1941–42 and 1942–43 Balkan played in the Serbian League which was the top national tier of the German-occupied Serbia during World War Two, finishing 10th and 8th respectively. Their main players in this period were former BSK Belgrade players Dragutin Najdanović, Rajko Pašanski and Miloš Šijačić.

== Recent league history ==
Season	Division	P	W	D	L	F	A	Pts	Pos
2020–21	5 - Belgrade First League Group A	30	12	6	12	44	37	42	7th
2021–22	5 - Belgrade First League Group A	26	13	10	3	51	22	49	3rd
2022–23	5 - Belgrade First League Group A	26	18	7	1	56	18	61	2nd
2023–24	4 - Belgrade Zone League	30	12	8	10	47	41	38 (Note: The club was docked six points.)	10th
2024–25	5 - Belgrade First League Group A	26	20	2	4	64	21	62	2nd

== Fans ==
Fans of the club are nicknamed Šumari (Serbian Cyrillic: Шумари, lit. 'The Forest Guard').

== Notable players ==
For the list of former and current players with Wikipedia article, please see: Category:FK Balkan Mirijevo players.
