= FK Slavija Beograd =

FK BPI Slavija
- Full name: Fudbalski Klub BPI Slavija
- Founded: 1912; 114 years ago
- Dissolved: 2014
- Ground: Slavija, Belgrade, Serbia
- Capacity: 500
- 2013–14: Belgrade First League Group A, 6th

Fudbalski Klub BPI Slavija was a Serbian football club based in Slavija, Belgrade.

== Name history ==
- FK BPI Pekar (1930–2006) nekadašnji MPI Beograd (Mlinsko pekarska industrija Beograd)
- FK BPI Slavija (2007–)

== Final seasons ==
Season	Division	P	W	D	L	F	A	Pts	Pos
2009–10	4 - Belgrade Zone League	34	15	12	7	44	28	57	4th
2010–11	4 - Belgrade Zone League	34	21	7	6	48	24	70	1st
2011–12	3 - Serbian League Belgrade	30	5	7	18	17	54	22	16th
2012–13	4 - Belgrade Zone League	32	5	5	22	24	67	20	17th
2013–14	5 - Belgrade First League - Group A	26	11	3	12	38	35	36	6th
