= Siniša Janković =

Serbian football manager and player

Personal information
- Full name: Siniša Janković
- Date of birth: 18 January 1978 (age 48)
- Place of birth: Belgrade, SR Serbia, SFR Yugoslavia
- Height: 1.65 m (5 ft 5 in)
- Position: Midfielder

Youth career
- Rabrovac
- Mladost Smederevska Palanka

Senior career*
Years	Team	Apps	(Gls)
1997–1998	Zvezdara		
1998–1999	Empoli	0	(0)
1998–1999	→ Cosenza (loan)	1	(0)
2002–2006	Primorje	85	(19)
2006–2008	Domžale	41	(4)
2008–2010	Nafta Lendava	41	(6)
2010–2012	Jasenica 1911		
2012–2014	Kovačevac		
2014–2016	Jasenica 1911		
Total		168	(29)

Managerial career
- 2023–2024: Mladenovac
- * Club domestic league appearances and goals

Siniša Janković (Serbian Cyrillic: Синиша Јанковић; born 18 January 1978) is a Serbian football manager and former player.

== Career ==
After playing for Zvezdara in the second tier of FR Yugoslavia football, Janković was signed by Serie A club Empoli in the summer of 1998. He later spent most of his career in Slovenia, making 167 appearances and scoring 29 goals in its top flight.
