= Nebojša Vignjević =

Serbian football manager and player

Personal information
- Date of birth: 15 May 1968 (age 58)
- Place of birth: Belgrade, SR Serbia, SFR Yugoslavia
- Position: Midfielder

Team information
- Current team: Diósgyőri (manager)

Youth career
- 1979–1986: Partizan

Senior career*
Years	Team	Apps	(Gls)
1987–1991	Rakovica		
1992–1995	Rad	102	(12)
1995–1997	EN Paralimni	46	(10)
1997–1999	Rad	47	(8)
1999–2000	Edmonton Drillers (indoor)	37	(11)
2000	Toronto Lynx	20	(0)
2001	Lombard Tatabánya	7	(2)
Total		259	(43)

Managerial career
- Rad (youth)
- BSK Borča
- 2005–2006: Rad (youth)
- 2006–2007: Radnički Pirot
- 2007: Rad
- 2007–2009: Grbalj
- 2009–2011: Rudar Pljevlja
- 2011: Hajduk Kula
- 2011–2012: Rad
- 2012–2013: Vojvodina
- 2013–2020: Újpest
- 2021–2022: Liepāja
- 2022: Budapest Honvéd
- 2022: Al Dhafra
- 2023–2024: Újpest
- 2025–2026: Iraklis
- 2026–: Diósgyőri
- * Club domestic league appearances and goals

Nebojša Vignjević (Serbian Cyrillic: Небојша Вигњевић; born 15 May 1968) is a Serbian football manager and former player.

== Playing career ==
Vignjević came through the youth system of Partizan, but failed to make any first-team appearances. He started his senior career at lower league club Rakovica, before moving to Yugoslav First League side Rad in the early 1990s. Later on, Vignjević spent some time with the Toronto Lynx of the USL A-League. He also played professionally in Hungary in the early 2000s.

== Managerial career ==
After hanging up his boots, Vignjević started working with the youth teams of Rad. He began his managerial career at BSK Borča in 2004, before returning to Rad. In June 2006, Vignjević took charge of Serbian First League club Radnički Pirot.

Between 2009 and 2011, Vignjević spent two seasons as manager of Montenegrin side Rudar Pljevlja, winning one Montenegrin First League title (2010) and back-to-back Montenegrin Cups (2010 and 2011).

=== Budapest Honvéd ===
On 2 February 2022, he was appointed as the coach of Budapest Honvéd FC.

=== Újpest ===
On 23 October 2013, Vignjević was appointed as manager of Hungarian club Újpest. He led the team to two Magyar Kupa trophies (2014 and 2018). On 1 June 2020, Vignjević was dismissed from his position due to poor results.

=== Diósgyőr ===
On 6 March 2026, he was appointed as the manager of the Nemzeti Bajnokság I club Diósgyőri VTK. He debuted with a 1-1 draw against MTK Budapest FC at the Hidegkuti Nándor Stadion on 8 March 2026.

== Personal life ==
Vignjević is the older brother of fellow former footballer Nikola Vignjević. They played indoor soccer together for National Professional Soccer League team Edmonton Drillers in the 1999–2000 season.

== Career statistics ==
Club	Season	League	
Club	Season	Apps	Goals
Rad	1991–92	8	1
Rad	1992–93	33	4
Rad	1993–94	30	3
Rad	1994–95	31	4
Rad	Total	102	12
EN Paralimni	1995–96	23	6
EN Paralimni	1996–97	23	4
EN Paralimni	Total	46	10
Rad	1997–98	23	7
Rad	1998–99	19	1
Rad	1999–2000	5	0
Rad	Total	47	8
Toronto Lynx	2000	20	0
Lombard Tatabánya	2000–01	7	2

== Honours ==
Rudar Pljevlja

- Montenegrin First League: 2009–10
- Montenegrin Cup: 2009–10, 2010–11

Újpest

- Magyar Kupa: 2013–14, 2017–18
- Szuperkupa: 2014
