= Stevan Milovac =

Serbian footballer

Personal information
- Full name: Stevan Milovac
- Date of birth: 25 February 1962 (age 64)
- Place of birth: Novi Sad, SFR Yugoslavia
- Height: 1.86 m (6 ft 1 in)
- Position: Midfielder

Senior career*
Years	Team	Apps	(Gls)
1983–1986	Novi Sad	95	(9)
1986–1989	Vojvodina	84	(3)
1990–1997	Salgueiros	199	(13)
Total		378	(25)
- * Club domestic league appearances and goals

Stevan Milovac (Serbian Cyrillic: Стеван Миловац; born 25 February 1962) is a Serbian-Portuguese retired footballer who played as a defensive midfielder.

His daughter Tamara Milovac is a Portuguese-Serbian basketball player.

== Football career ==
Milovac was born in Novi Sad, Socialist Federal Republic of Yugoslavia. In his country he represented FK Novi Sad (second division) and FK Vojvodina, helping the latter win the Yugoslav First League in the 1988–89 season.

In January 1990, aged 28, Milovac was allowed to leave the country and signed for Salgueiros in Portugal, helping to promotion to the Primeira Liga in his first season. In the following campaign the Paranhos side overachieved for a final fifth place, with the subsequent qualification to the UEFA Cup – a first-ever– with the player scoring three goals in 36 games; in five of his seven-and-a-half years with the club, he shared teams with countrymen Čedomir Đoinčević and Jovica Nikolić.

After 1996–97, with Salgueiros nearly qualifying for Europe after finishing in sixth position, 35-year-old Milovac retired from football, having appeared in nearly 250 official matches for Salgueiros.

== Personal life ==
Milovac married Andja, with the couple having one son, Stefan. After ending his football career he settled in Portugal, owning and running a restaurant in Faro.
