= Lisović =

- Suburban settlement
- Location within Serbia
- Coordinates: 44°33′08″N 20°26′47″E
- Country: Serbia

Area
  - Total: 15.13 km^{2} (5.84 sq mi)

Population (2011)
  - Total: 1,054
  - Density: 69.66/km^{2} (180.4/sq mi)
- Time zone: UTC+1 (CET)
  - Summer (DST): UTC+2 (CEST)

Lisović (Serbian Cyrillic: Лисовић) is a suburban settlement of Belgrade, Serbia. It is located in the municipality of Barajevo.

This village became known because the reality TV show The Farm is filmed here.

Lisović is the easternmost settlement in the municipality, located on the northern slopes of the Kosmaj mountain. It's a small rural settlement, away from the major roads and railways, with a population of 1,057 (Census 2002).

== Sports ==
Football club FK Lisović 1977 has competed one season in the Serbian third tier.
