= OFK Mladenovac =

Serbian football club

Mladenovac
- Full name: Omladinski Fudbalski Klub Mladenovac
- Founded: 1924; 102 years ago
- Ground: Stadion Selters
- Capacity: 4,000
- President: Stefan Srećković
- Head coach: Stefan Ranđelović
- League: Belgrade Zone League
- 2024–25: Belgrade Zone League, 5th of 16
- Website: ofkmladenovac.rs
Home colours	Away colours

OFK Mladenovac (Serbian Cyrillic: ОФК Младеновац) is a football club based in Mladenovac, Belgrade, Serbia. They compete in the Belgrade Zone League, the fourth tier of the national league system.

== History ==
The original club became a member of the Belgrade Football Subassociation in 1924 under the name MSK Vojvoda Katić. They changed their name to FK Jedinstvo in 1945 following World War II and eventually to OFK Mladenovac in 1962. The club would reach the fourth tier of Yugoslav football in 1986 after winning the Belgrade Zone League.

At the beginning of the new millennium, the club won the Serbian League Belgrade in the 2000–01 season and took promotion to the Second League of FR Yugoslavia. They competed in Group East in their debut appearance in the second tier, finishing in third place. In the next 2002–03 season, the club was relegated back to the Serbian League Belgrade.

In 2005, the club placed first in the Serbian League Belgrade and earned promotion to the Serbian First League. They spent three seasons in the second tier, before suffering relegation back to the Serbian League Belgrade in 2008. The club would win the third-tier championship for the third time in 2011 to return to the Serbian First League.

After suffering a double relegation in 2012–13 and 2013–14, the club dropped to the Belgrade Zone League, the fourth tier of Serbian football. However, due to financial difficulties, they were forced to start the following 2014–15 season in the Mladenovac Municipal League, the sixth tier of the national league pyramid.

== Honours ==
- Serbian League Belgrade (Tier 3)
  - 2000–01, 2004–05, 2010–11
- Belgrade Zone League (Tier 4)
  - 1997–98
- Belgrade First League (Tier 5)
  - 2017–18 (Group C)
- Mladenovac Municipal League (Tier 6)
  - 2014–15

== Recent league history ==
Season	Division	P	W	D	L	F	A	Pts	Pos
2020–21	3 - Serbian League Belgrade	38	8	6	24	25	54	30	18th
2021–22	4 - Belgrade Zone League	30	13	4	13	53	49	43	7th
2022–23	4 - Belgrade Zone League	30	11	8	11	39	33	41	6th
2023–24	4 - Belgrade Zone League	30	16	4	10	57	30	52	7th
2024–25	4 - Belgrade Zone League	26	16	2	8	49	28	50	5th

== Notable players ==
This is a list of players who have played at full international level.

- (Montenegro) Darko Božović
- (Montenegro) Marko Simić
- (North Macedonia) Mario Đurovski
- (Serbia) Aleksandar Andrejević
- (Serbia) Stefan Panić
- (Serbia and Montenegro) Radivoje Manić

For a list of all OFK Mladenovac players with a Wikipedia article, see Category:OFK Mladenovac players.

== Historical list of coaches ==
- (Socialist Federal Republic of Yugoslavia) Branko Zutić (1961-1964)
- (Socialist Federal Republic of Yugoslavia) Branko Zutić (1965-1968)
- (Socialist Federal Republic of Yugoslavia) Branko Zutić (1969-1975)
- (Socialist Federal Republic of Yugoslavia) Dragoslav Šekularac
- (Socialist Federal Republic of Yugoslavia) Branko Zutić (1984-1985)
- (Serbia and Montenegro) Dragoslav Jovanović
- (Serbia and Montenegro) Ljubiša Stamenković (2001–2002)
- (Serbia and Montenegro) Zoran Nikolić (2002-2004)
- (Serbia and Montenegro) Nebojša Vučićević (2005)
- (Serbia and Montenegro) Aleksandar Krivokapić (2005)
- (Serbia and Montenegro) Miodrag Marinković (2006)
- (Serbia) Zoran Nikolić (2006)
- (Serbia) Ljubiša Stamenković (2006–2007)
- (Serbia) Ivan Adžić (2007)
- (Serbia) Vlada Milošević (2007)
- (Serbia) Žarko Đurović (2008)
- (Serbia) Dragoslav Jovanović (2008)
- (Serbia) Mirko Mijović (2008)
- (Serbia) Aleksandar Marinković (2009)
- (Serbia) Ivan Bujagić (2009–2010)
- (Serbia) Radovan Radaković (2010–2012)
- (Serbia) Zoran Nikolić (2012)
- (Serbia) Nebojša Petrović (2012)
- (Serbia) Žarko Đurović (2012)
- (Serbia) Miloš Joksić (2013)
- (Serbia) Žarko Đurović (2013)
- (Serbia) Ivan Bujagić (2013–2014)
- (Serbia) Goran Spasić (2017-2019)
- (Serbia) Miloš Višnjić (2019–2020)
- (Serbia) Zoran Nikolić (Oct 2020-2021)
- (Serbia) Goran Spasić (Jun 2021-2022)
- (Serbia) Siniša Janković (Jan 2023–Aug 24)
- (Serbia) Nenad Kovačević (Aug 2024-Nov 24)
- (Serbia) Goran Spasić (Nov 2024- Jun 25)
- (Serbia) Stefan Ranđelović (June 2025-)
