= Radovan Radaković =

Serbian football manager and player (1971–2022)

Personal information
- Date of birth: 6 February 1971
- Place of birth: Zemun, SR Serbia, SFR Yugoslavia
- Date of death: 25 September 2022 (aged 51)
- Place of death: Belgrade, Serbia
- Height: 1.85 m (6 ft 1 in)
- Position: Goalkeeper

Youth career
- Zemun

Senior career*
Years	Team	Apps	(Gls)
1991–1995	Obilić	3	(0)
1993–1994	→ BSK Batajnica (loan)	30	(0)
1996	BSK Batajnica		
1997	Borac Čačak	14	(0)
1997–1999	Tilleur-Liégeois	64	(0)
1999–2000	Radnički Kragujevac	40	(0)
2000–2004	Partizan	61	(0)
2004–2005	Sturm Graz	15	(0)
2006	Zemun	26	(0)
2007	Voždovac	7	(0)
2007–2008	Kolubara	11	(0)
Total		271	(0)

International career
2001	FR Yugoslavia	2	(0)

Managerial career
- 2010–2012: Mladenovac
- 2013: Kolubara
- 2013: Smederevo
- 2015–2016: Radnički 1923
- 2017–2018: Šumadija Aranđelovac
- 2018: Dunav Stari Banovci
- 2019: OFK Vršac
- * Club domestic league appearances and goals

Radovan Radaković (Serbian Cyrillic: Радован Радаковић; 6 February 1971 – 25 September 2022) was a Serbian football manager and player.

== Club career ==
Radaković played for numerous clubs in his homeland, having his most successful period with Partizan. He won back-to-back championships with the Crno-beli in 2002 and 2003, as well as the national cup in 2001. During his career, Radaković also spent some time abroad, having stints in Belgium (Tilleur-Liégeois) and Austria (Sturm Graz).

== International career ==
At international level, Radaković was capped twice for FR Yugoslavia, making both appearances in the FIFA World Cup 2002 qualifying stage. He made his national team debut in a 1–1 away draw against Russia on 2 June 2001. Four days later, Radaković kept a clean sheet in a 6–0 home win over the Faroe Islands.

== Managerial career ==
After hanging up his boots, Radaković started his managerial career at Mladenovac in 2010. He also served as manager of Kolubara, Smederevo, Radnički 1923 (September 2015–December 2016), Šumadija Aranđelovac, Dunav Stari Banovci, and OFK Vršac.

== Death ==
Radaković died of stomach cancer on 25 September 2022.

== Honours ==
Partizan

- First League of FR Yugoslavia: 2001–02, 2002–03
- FR Yugoslavia Cup: 2000–01
