= Zdravko Zemunović =

Serbian footballer (born 1954)

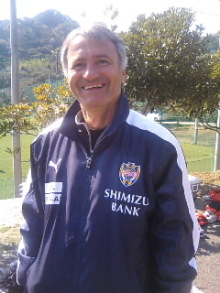
- Zemunović with Shimizu S-Pulse

Personal information
- Date of birth: 26 March 1954 (age 72)
- Place of birth: SFR Yugoslavia

Senior career*
Years	Team	Apps	(Gls)
1969–1976	Teleoptik		
1977–1979	Čukarički		
1980–1986	BSK Batajnica		

Managerial career
- 1988–1990: BSK Batajnica
- 1990–1992: Teleoptik
- 1992–1994: Voždovac
- 1995: Tosu Futures (coach)
- 1999–2000: Shimizu S-Pulse (youth)
- 2000–2002: Shimizu S-Pulse
- 2004: Rad
- 2008–2011: Shimizu S-Pulse (technical advisor)
- 2005–: Chiba Football Association
- 2016–2018: Vonds Ichihara
- 2020: FC Gifu
- 2021: Kamatamare Sanuki
- * Club domestic league appearances and goals

Zdravko Zemunović (born 26 March 1954) is a Serbian football manager and former player.

== Playing career ==
Zemunović started his career at FK Teleoptik in 1969. After playing for Teleoptik for seven years, he played for FK Čukarički and FK BSK Batajnica. In 1986, he retired due to a knee injury at the age of 32.

== Managerial career ==
After his retirement, Zemunović enrolled in the department of Physical Education at University of Belgrade and acquired his professional coaching license there.

=== In Yugoslavia ===
As a professional coach, Zemunović worked for the three professional football clubs in Yugoslavia (BSK Batajnica, Teleoptik, Voždovac) and won league championships with all three clubs. He visited Japan as a member of Partizan for the Kirin Cup in 1992.

=== In Japan ===
In order to avoid the civil war of Yugoslavia, Zemunović and his family decided to move to Japan and he started his coaching career in Japan as a coach of Tosu Futures for a year. After working for a couple of amateur clubs in Chiba, Japan, he became the general manager of the youth and junior youth team of Shimizu S-Pulse in 1999 and cultivated young talents such as Takuma Edamura and Kota Sugiyama. In December 2000, he took up the post of the manager of Shimizu S-Pulse as the successor of Steve Perryman and won the Emperor's Cup on 1 January 2001 and also won the Japanese Super Cup next month.

After the coaching career in Shimizu S-Pulse, though he coached FK Rad for one season, he is engaging into the development of young talents as technical director.

== Managerial statistics ==
Team	From	To	Record				
Team	From	To	G	W	D	L	Win %
Shimizu S-Pulse	2001	2002	60	33	3	24	55.00
Total			60	33	3	24	55.00

== Honours ==
Shimizu S-Pulse

- Emperor's Cup:2001, 2000 (Runner-up)
- Japanese Super Cup:2001, 2002
- Asian Cup Winners' Cup:2001 (3rd place)
- AFC Champions League:2002 (Final Round)
