= FK Rakovica =

Serbian football club

Rakovica
- Full name: Fudbalski Klub Rakovica
- Nickname: Motoristi (The Motor Men)
- Founded: 1937; 89 years ago
- Ground: Stadion FK Rakovica, Belgrade
- Capacity: 2,000
- President: Igor Dejanović
- League: Belgrade Intermunicipal League – Group B
- 2024–25: Belgrade Intermunicipal League – Group B, 2nd of 11
- Website: fkrakovica.rs
Home colours	Away colours

FK Rakovica (Serbian Cyrillic: ФК Раковица) is a football club based in Rakovica, Belgrade, Serbia. They compete in the Belgrade Intermunicipal League, the sixth tier of the national league system.

== History ==
Founded in 1937, the club was accepted into the Belgrade Football Subassociation in 1940. They were reestablished after World War II in 1947 as Motor, before being renamed to Rakovica in 1948. In 1954, the club became known as IM Rakovica (IMR), backed by the manufacturing factory of the same name.

With the beginning of the new millennium, the club competed in the 2000–01 Second League of FR Yugoslavia, finishing bottom of the table in Group North. They subsequently suffered consecutive relegations, finding themselves in the fifth tier by the 2003–04 season.

After winning the Belgrade First League in the 2011–12 season, the club finished as runners-up of the 2012–13 Belgrade Zone League and earned promotion to the Serbian League Belgrade. They spent four seasons in the third tier, before finishing bottom of the table in 2016–17. In 2017, the club reverted its name to Rakovica.

=== Recent league history ===
Season	Division	P	W	D	L	F	A	Pts	Pos
2020–21	5 - Belgrade First League - Group A	30	11	7	12	58	52	40	8th
2021–22	5 - Belgrade First League - Group A	26	5	5	16	28	55	20	13th
2022–23	6 - Belgrade Intermunicipal League – Group B	20	13	2	5	69	36	41	3rd
2023–24	6 - Belgrade Intermunicipal League – Group B	18	11	3	4	45	27	36	3rd
2024–25	6 - Belgrade Intermunicipal League – Group B	20	12	6	2	61	27	42	2nd

== Honours ==
Belgrade First League (Tier 5)

- 2011–12

== Notable players ==
For a list of all FK Rakovica players with a Wikipedia article, see Category:FK Rakovica players.

== Managerial history ==
Period	Name
2013–2016	(Serbia) Dragan Stevanović
	(Serbia) Dragan Stefanović
