= Dragan Aničić =

Serbian footballer and coach

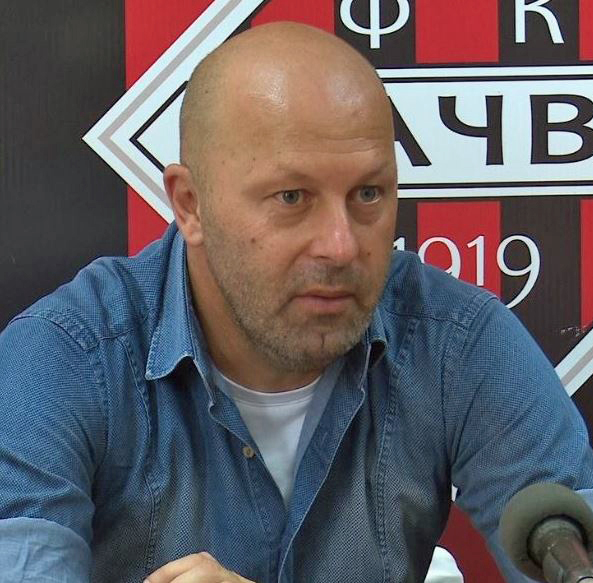
- Aničič, head coach of Macva Sabac

Personal information
- Date of birth: 4 November 1970 (age 55)
- Place of birth: Belgrade, SR Serbia, SFR Yugoslavia
- Height: 1.76 m (5 ft 9 in)
- Position: Defender

Youth career
- Red Star Belgrade

Senior career*
Years	Team	Apps	(Gls)
1988–1989	Mladost Petrinja		
1989–1992	Proleter Zrenjanin		
1992–1993	Trudbenik		
1993–1994	Dinamo Pančevo		
1994–1997	Palilulac Beograd		
1997–1998	Panargiakos		
1998–1999	Kolubara		
1999–2000	Beograd		
2000–2001	Sartid Smederevo		
2001–2002	BSK Borča		

Managerial career
- 2013–2014: BSK Borča
- 2015: BSK Borča
- 2015: Sloga Petrovac na Mlavi
- 2015–2016: BSK Borča
- 2017–2018: Mačva Šabac
- 2018–2019: Voždovac
- 2019–2020: Mačva Šabac
- 2021–2022: Železničar Pančevo
- 2022–2023: Rudar Pljevlja
- 2023: Novi Pazar
- 2024: Sloven Ruma
- 2024–2025: Partizani (assistant)
- 2025-2026: FK 011 Beograd U17
- 2026-2027: FK 011 Beograd U19
- * Club domestic league appearances and goals

Dragan Aničić (Serbian Cyrillic: Драган Аничић; born 4 November 1970) is a Serbian football coach and former player.

== Playing career ==
Born in Belgrade, Aničić started youth career in FK Crvena Zvezda in 1979. During his senior career he played as a defender for GŠNK Mladost Petrinja, FK Proleter Zrenjanin, FK Trudbenik, FK Dinamo Pančevo, FK Palilulac Beograd, Panargiakos FC in Greece, FK Kolubara, FK Beograd, FK Sartid Smederevo and FK BSK Borča.

== Coaching career ==
After his playing career, Aničić began coaching. In 2003 he started coaching at BSK Borča youth academy and in 2006 became director of academy.

In 2013 he had first senior coaching spell with FK BSK Borča as a head coach in Serbian First League. After that he coached FK Sloga Petrovac na Mlavi, FK BSK Borča and finally in January 2017 he was appointed head coach of FK Mačva Šabac, leading the team to promotion from Serbian First League to Serbian SuperLiga after 65 years playing in lower divisions

On 15 October 2018, Aničić was appointed head coach of FK Voždovac. In September 2019, Aničić returned to FK Mačva Šabac as manager and stayed till December 2020.

In January 2021, Aničić was appointed head coach of FK Železničar Pančevo

In September 2022, Aničić was appointed head coach of FK Rudar Pljevlja

In June 2023, Aničić was appointed head coach of FK Novi Pazar

In June 2024, Aničić was appointed head coach of GFK Sloven Ruma

In August 2024. Dragan Anicic left GFK Sloven Ruma and accepted an offer from Aleksandar Veselinovic to form part of the coaching staff of the Albanian Kategoria Superiore team FK Partizani Tirana.
