= Bogdan Korak =

Serbian football manager and player

Personal information
- Full name: Bogdan Korak
- Date of birth: 2 November 1959 (age 66)
- Place of birth: Belgrade, PR Serbia, FPR Yugoslavia
- Height: 1.90 m (6 ft 3 in)
- Position: Forward

Team information
- Current team: Rad (manager)

Youth career
- Palilulac Beograd

Senior career*
Years	Team	Apps	(Gls)
1981–1987	Rad	143+	(38+)
1988	Murcia	12	(3)
1989	Vorwärts Steyr	7	(1)
1990–1991	Mogren	30	(10)
199x–199x	Hajduk Beograd		
1994–1995	Mladost Umčari		
Total		192+	(52+)

Managerial career
- 199x–200x: Rad (youth)
- 2003: BSK Borča
- 2004–2005: Radnički Kragujevac
- 2005–2006: Rad
- 2007–2008: Vršac
- 2009: Hajduk Kula
- 2010–2011: Asante Kotoko
- 2011: Leotar
- 2012–2013: Novi Sad
- 2014–2015: Srem Jakovo
- 2015: Grbalj
- 2017: Kolubara
- 2017: Sinđelić Beograd
- 2018: Budućnost Dobanovci
- 2019: Rad
- 2021: Radnički Sremska Mitrovica
- 2022: Rad
- 2024-: Rad
- * Club domestic league appearances and goals

Bogdan Korak (Serbian Cyrillic: Богдан Корак; born 2 November 1959) is a Serbian football manager and former player.

== Playing career ==
During the 1980s, Korak played seven seasons for Rad, helping them win promotion to the Yugoslav First League in 1987. He subsequently spent some time abroad in Spain (Murcia) and Austria (Vorwärts Steyr). Later on, Korak returned to his homeland and played for Mogren in the 1990–91 Yugoslav Second League. He finished his career playing for Mladost Umčari in the Serbian League Belgrade.

== Managerial career ==
After hanging up his boots, Korak was manager of numerous clubs in his country and abroad, including Rad and Hajduk Kula.

Between November 2010 and August 2011, Korak served as manager of Ghana Premier League club Asante Kotoko.
