= Dragan Gugleta =

Yugoslav and Serbian football manager and player

Personal information
- Full name: Dragan Gugleta
- Date of birth: 17 July 1941 (age 85)
- Place of birth: Kragujevac, German-occupied Serbia
- Height: 1.70 m (5 ft 7 in)
- Position: Midfielder

Youth career
- Proleter Banatski Karlovac

Senior career*
| Years | Team | Apps | (Gls) |
| 1962–1967 | OFK Beograd | 108 | (17) |
| 1967–1969 | Strasbourg | 37 | (8) |
| 1969–1970 | Olimpija Ljubljana | 19 | (3) |
| 1970–1972 | OFK Beograd | 40 | (4) |
| 1972–1974 | Borac Banja Luka | 33 | (4) |
| Total | | 237 | (36) |

International career
| 1965–1966 | Yugoslavia | 8 | (2) |

Managerial career
- 1985-1986: AS Marsa
- 1987–1989: Rad
- Al-Jahra
- 1990–1991: Rad
- 1993-1995: Qadsia
- 1999–2000: Al-Arabi Kuwait
- 2000–2001: Al-Shaab
- 2001–2002: Sharjah
- Dubai
- 2005: Emirates
- 2008–2009: Al-Ahly Benghazi
- 2009: Srem
- 2009–2010: Al-Ahly Benghazi
- * Club domestic league appearances and goals

Dragan Gugleta (Serbian Cyrillic: Драган Гуглета; born 17 July 1941) is a Yugoslav and Serbian former football manager and player.

== Club career ==
Between 1962 and 1967, Gugleta spent five seasons with OFK Beograd, amassing over 100 appearances in the Yugoslav First League. He was also a regular member of the team that won the Yugoslav Cup in the 1965–66 campaign. In 1967, Gugleta moved abroad to France and signed with Strasbourg. He spent two seasons with the French club before returning to Yugoslavia. After a short stint at Olimpija Ljubljana, Gugleta rejoined OFK Beograd. He retired after playing with Borac Banja Luka in 1974.

== International career ==
At international level, Gugleta was capped eight times for Yugoslavia from 1965 to 1966, scoring two goals. His final international was a November 1966 friendly match away against Bulgaria.

== Managerial career ==
During his managerial career, Gugleta served as manager of numerous clubs in many Middle Eastern and North African countries, including Tunisia, Kuwait, United Arab Emirates, Qatar, and Libya. He was also manager of Rad and led them to a fourth-place finish in the 1988–89 Yugoslav First League, qualifying for European football for the first time in club history.

== Honours ==
OFK Beograd

- Yugoslav Cup: 1965–66
