= Zvezdan Milošević =

Bosnian-born Swedish football manager (born 1964)

Personal information
- Date of birth: 22 April 1964 (age 62)
- Place of birth: Sarajevo, SR Bosnia and Herzegovina, Yugoslavia

Youth career
- Years: Team
- 1977–1985: Željezničar

Managerial career
- 2004–2005: Väsby United
- 2006: Assyriska FF
- 2008: Akropolis IF
- 2008: Bodens BK
- 2010–2011: Grbalj
- 2013: IK Brage
- 2014: Syrianska
- 2015: Landskrona BoIS
- 2017: Utenis Utena
- 2017–2018: OFK Bačka
- 2018: Syrianska
- 2018: Najran
- 2018: Syrianska
- 2019: Rad
- 2019: Grbalj
- 2019: Panachaiki
- 2025: Igman Konjic

Zvezdan Milošević (born 22 April 1964) is a Bosnian-born Swedish professional football manager and former player.

== Playing career ==
Milošević was born in Sarajevo, SFR Yugoslavia. He started playing football at a young age and his first club was hometown team Željezničar. He played for minor clubs in the former Yugoslavia and Italy, before coming to Sweden in 1989 for a trial with Djurgården. He did not get a contract but instead started to play for minor clubs in the Stockholm region, like Väsby IK, Assyriska FF and Café Opera.

== Managerial career ==
Milošević started his managerial career in 2000 as an assistant at Essinge. In 2017, he joined Lithuanian A Lyga side Utenis Utena, signing a three-year contract with the club. Despite leading the team into a fifth place finish in the league, Milošević was sacked on 24 April 2017.

On 1 October 2019, he was appointed as sporting director of Montenegrin First League club Budućnost Podgorica.
