= Čedomir Đoinčević =

Serbian football manager and player

Personal information
- Date of birth: 5 May 1961 (age 65)
- Place of birth: Belgrade, FPR Yugoslavia
- Height: 1.85 m (6 ft 1 in)
- Position: Centre-back

Youth career
- Vranić

Senior career*
Years	Team	Apps	(Gls)
1983–1984	Žarkovo		
1984–1985	Crvenka	15	(1)
1987–1990	Rad	87	(4)
1990–1994	Salgueiros	100	(3)
1994–1995	Radnički Beograd	24	(2)

Managerial career
- 1997–1999: Rad
- 2000: Litex Lovech
- 2001: Rad
- 2002: Mladost Apatin
- 2002: Vojvodina
- 2003: Zemun
- 2004: Kastoria
- 2005: Železnik
- 2005: Rad
- 2005–2006: Bežanija
- 2007: Voždovac
- 2008: Laktaši
- * Club domestic league appearances and goals

Čedomir Đoinčević (Serbian Cyrillic: Чедомир Ђоинчевић; born 5 May 1961) is a Serbian former football manager and player.

== Playing career ==
After starting out at his local club Vranić, Đoinčević played for Žarkovo in the Belgrade Zone League. He would make his Yugoslav Second League debut with Crvenka in the 1984–85 season. Later on, Đoinčević joined Rad, making his Yugoslav First League debut in the 1987–88 season. He played regularly for the Građevinari over the years, appearing in the 1989–90 UEFA Cup.

In late summer 1990, Đoinčević moved abroad to Portugal and signed with Primeira Divisão newcomers Salgueiros. He helped the Paranhos side to a fifth-place finish in his first season, starting in all of his 36 appearances, as the club qualified to the 1991–92 UEFA Cup. During his spell with the club, Đoinčević shared teams with countrymen Stevan Milovac and Jovica Nikolić.

== Managerial career ==
After hanging up his boots, Đoinčević enjoyed success as manager of his former club Rad, being voted best in the domestic league for 1999 in a poll organized by Politika. He was subsequently hired as manager of Bulgarian side Litex Lovech, before returning to Rad. Later on, Đoinčević was manager of Vojvodina from March to December 2002.

In August 2004, Đoinčević took charge of Greek club Kastoria. He was appointed as manager of Železnik in late April 2005, winning the Serbia and Montenegro Cup just four weeks later. After his third stint with Rad, Đoinčević served as manager of Serbian First League clubs Bežanija (October 2005–May 2006) and Voždovac (2007). He also worked at Laktaši in the top flight of Bosnia and Herzegovina football.

In December 2013, Đoinčević was appointed as sporting director of Rad, but stepped down in March 2014.

== Honours ==
Železnik

- Serbia and Montenegro Cup: 2004–05
