= FK BSK Batajnica =

Serbian football club

BSK 1925 Batajnica
- Full name: Fudbalski Klub BSK 1925 Batajnica
- Founded: 1925; 101 years ago
- Ground: Stadion Aerodrom
- Capacity: 2,500
- Secretary-General: Dragan Dimitrijević
- Head coach: Vladimir Kašić
- League: Belgrade First League
- 2024–25: Belgrade First League – Group A, 6th
- Website: Official
| Home colours | Away colours |

FK BSK 1925 Batajnica (Serbian Cyrillic: ФК БСК Батајница) is a football club based in Batajnica, Belgrade, Serbia. They compete in the Belgrade First League, the fifth tier of the national league system.

== History ==
The club achieved its biggest success by reaching the quarter-finals of the 1996–97 FR Yugoslavia Cup. They initially defeated Partizan 2–1 in the opening round, pulling off one of the biggest upsets in the history of Yugoslav and Serbian football. They subsequently eliminated Budućnost Podgorica, before eventually losing to Jedinstvo Paraćin.

In the COVID-19-interrupted 2019–20 season, the club placed first in the Belgrade Zone League and gained promotion to the Serbian League Belgrade, returning to the third tier after 17 years.

=== Recent league history ===
| Season | Division | P | W | D | L | F | A | Pts | Pos |
|---|---|---|---|---|---|---|---|---|---|
| 2020–21 | 3 - Serbian League Belgrade | 38 | 3 | 10 | 25 | 18 | 77 | 19 | 20th |
| 2021–22 | 4 - Belgrade Zone League | 30 | 5 | 7 | 18 | 20 | 62 | 22 | 15th |
| 2022–23 | 5 - Belgrade First League | 26 | 6 | 2 | 18 | 35 | 61 | 20 | 12th |
| 2023–24 | 6 - Intermunicipal League Belgrade | 26 | 7 | 8 | 11 | 47 | 50 | 29 | 10th |
| 2024–25 | 5 - Belgrade First League | 26 | 13 | 5 | 8 | 44 | 25 | 44 | 6th |

== Honours ==
Belgrade Zone League (Tier 4)

- 2019–20

Belgrade First League (Tier 5)

- 2014–15 (Group A)

== Notable players ==
This is a list of players who have played at full international level.

- (Serbia and Montenegro) Radovan Radaković

For a list of all FK BSK Batajnica players with a Wikipedia article, see Category:FK BSK Batajnica players.
