= Slađan Nikolić =

Serbian footballer

Personal information
- Full name: Slađan Nikolić
- Date of birth: 27 October 1974 (age 52)
- Place of birth: Kosovska Mitrovica, SFR Yugoslavia
- Height: 1.83 m (6 ft 0 in)
- Position: Midfielder

Youth career
- Trepča

Senior career*
Years	Team	Apps	(Gls)
1995–1998	Rad	77	(7)
1998–2000	Austria Salzburg	42	(7)
2000	LASK	5	(0)
2000–2002	Rad	49	(15)
2002–2003	Vojvodina	20	(3)
2003–2004	Radnički Obrenovac		
2005–2006	Jedinstvo Bijelo Polje	2	(0)
Total		195	(32)

Managerial career
- 2009–2010: BASK
- 2013–2014: Rad (assistant / caretaker)
- 2016: Rad (caretaker)
- 2017–2018: Rad
- 2018: Budućnost Dobanovci
- 2019: Kolubara
- 2021–2024: Red Star Belgrade (youth)
- * Club domestic league appearances and goals

Slađan Nikolić (Serbian Cyrillic: Слађан Николић; born 27 October 1974) is a Serbian former professional footballer who played as a midfielder and current manager.

== Career ==
Nikolić spent the majority of his playing career at Rad in the First League of FR Yugoslavia, but also played abroad for Austria Salzburg in the Austrian Football Bundesliga.

During his managerial career, Nikolić served as an assistant, caretaker and later manager of Rad in the Serbian SuperLiga.
