= Dragan Stevanović =

Serbian football manager and player

Personal information
- Date of birth: 16 August 1971 (age 55)
- Place of birth: Belgrade, SR Serbia, SFR Yugoslavia
- Height: 1.84 m (6 ft 0 in)
- Position: Forward

Team information
- Current team: Ravna Gora (head coach)

Senior career*
Years	Team	Apps	(Gls)
- Voždovac
1995–1997	Rad	59	(13)
1997–1998	VfL Wolfsburg	15	(1)
1999	FC St. Pauli	6	(2)
1999	Rad	20	(5)
2000	Red Star Belgrade	25	(9)
2001–2002	Rad	20	(3)
2002–2003	Apollon Smyrnis	11	(1)
2003	Radnički Obrenovac	19	(4)

Managerial career
- 2011–2013: Zemun
- 2013–2016: Rakovica
- 2016–2018: Omladinac Novi Banovci
- 2018–2019: Rad
- 2019–2020: Omladinac Novi Banovci
- 2020: Budućnost Dobanovci
- 2021: Smederevo 1924
- 2021–2022: Omladinac Novi Banovci
- 2022: Budućnost Dobanovci
- 2022: Brodarac
- 2023: Podunavac Belegiš
- 2024–: Ravna Gora
- * Club domestic league appearances and goals

Dragan Stevanović (Serbian Cyrillic: Драган Стевановић; born 16 August 1971) is a Serbian football manager and former forward. During his playing career he represented Rad, Red Star Belgrade—winning the domestic league and cup double in the 1999–2000 season—and had spells abroad with German clubs VfL Wolfsburg and FC St. Pauli, as well as Greek side Apollon Smyrnis.

Since retiring, he has managed numerous Serbian clubs, including Omladinac Novi Banovci and Rad in the Serbian SuperLiga, and is currently head coach of Ravna Gora.

== Playing career ==
Stevanović played for Rad in the First League of FR Yugoslavia, before moving abroad to German club VfL Wolfsburg in 1997. He also played for FC St. Pauli, before returning to Rad in 1999. Subsequently, Stevanović moved to Red Star Belgrade, helping them win the championship in 2000.

== Managerial career ==
After hanging up his boots, Stevanović served as manager of several clubs in his homeland, including Rakovica and Omladinac Novi Banovci. He was also manager of Rad during the 2018–19 Serbian SuperLiga.

== Honours ==
Red Star Belgrade

- First League of FR Yugoslavia: 1999–2000
- FR Yugoslavia Cup: 1999–2000
