= Ivan Čabrinović =

Serbian football manager and player

Personal information
- Full name: Ivan Čabrinović
- Date of birth: 3 August 1939 (age 87)
- Place of birth: Kragujevac, Kingdom of Yugoslavia
- Height: 1.74 m (5 ft 9 in)
- Position: Midfielder

Youth career
- Kolonija Kragujevac

Senior career*
Years	Team	Apps	(Gls)
1958–1963	Radnički Kragujevac		
1964–1966	Radnički Beograd		

Managerial career
- 1972–1973: Borac Banja Luka (assistant)
- 1973–1974: Borac Banja Luka
- 1974–1983: Galenika Zemun
- Pelister
- 1988–1990: Yugoslavia U21
- 1990–1992: Yugoslavia (assistant)
- 1992: Yugoslavia
- 1994: Bahrain
- 1995: Tosu Futures
- 1997: Spartak Subotica
- 1997–1998: Zemun
- 2001: Zemun
- * Club domestic league appearances and goals

Ivan Čabrinović (Serbian Cyrillic: Иван Чабриновић; born 3 August 1939) is a Serbian former football manager and player.

== Playing career ==
After starting out at Kolonija Kragujevac, Čabrinović played five seasons with Radnički Kragujevac in the Yugoslav Second League between 1958 and 1963. He joined fellow Second League club Radnički Beograd in 1964 and helped them win promotion to the Yugoslav First League in 1965. Before retiring, Čabrinović spent some time with Partizan, but failed to sign a contract.

== Managerial career ==
After hanging up his boots, Čabrinović served as an assistant to Gojko Zec at Borac Banja Luka, before replacing him as manager in 1973.

In the summer of 1974, Čabrinović was appointed as manager of Galenika Zemun. He spent the next nine seasons in charge, winning promotion to the Yugoslav Second League in 1978 and eventually to the Yugoslav First League in 1982.

Čabrinović led the Yugoslavia national under-21 football team to the UEFA European Under-21 Championship final in 1990, but lost to the Soviet Union. He also served as an assistant to Yugoslavia manager Ivica Osim at the 1990 FIFA World Cup. In May 1992, following the resignation of Osim, Čabrinović took charge of the Yugoslavia national team just a few weeks ahead of UEFA Euro 1992. However, the team was eventually suspended from the tournament due to the Yugoslav Wars.
