= Nebojša Milošević =

Serbian football manager

Personal information
- Date of birth: 30 June 1973 (age 53)
- Place of birth: Ub, SR Serbia, SFR Yugoslavia

Team information
- Current team: Shanghai Shenhua (assistant)

Managerial career
- Years: Team
- 2009–2010: Red Star Belgrade (scout)
- 2011–2012: Radnički Obrenovac
- 2012–2013: BSK Borča
- 2013: Rad
- 2014–2015: Red Star Belgrade (first-team coach)
- 2015: Zemun
- 2016: Changchun Yatai (assistant)
- 2016–2017: Radnik Bijeljina
- 2017: Riga FC (assistant)
- 2018: Levski Sofia (assistant)
- 2019: Latvia (assistant)
- 2019: El Gouna
- 2019–2022: Red Star Belgrade (assistant)
- 2022–2023: APOEL (assistant)
- 2023: Apollon Limassol (assistant)
- 2023–2026: Red Star Belgrade (assistant)
- 2026–: Shanghai Shenhua (assistant)

Nebojša Milošević (Serbian Cyrillic: Небојша Милошевић; born 30 June 1973) is a Serbian football manager.

== Managerial career ==
After spending nearly two years at the helm of Serbian League Belgrade club Radnički Obrenovac, Milošević was appointed as manager of Serbian SuperLiga side BSK Borča in December 2012.

In August 2016, Milošević was appointed as manager of Radnik Bijeljina. He left his position in May 2017.

Between 2017 and 2019, Milošević served as an assistant to Slaviša Stojanović at Riga FC, Levski Sofia, and the Latvia national football team.

In July 2019, Milošević was appointed as manager of Egyptian Premier League club El Gouna. He was dismissed five months later due to poor results.
