= Đorđe Gerum =

Serbian football manager and player

Personal information
- Date of birth: 28 September 1940 (age 86)
- Place of birth: Pančevo, Kingdom of Yugoslavia
- Position: Midfielder

Youth career
- Dinamo Pančevo
- Partizan

Senior career*
Years	Team	Apps	(Gls)
1959–1963	Radnički Kragujevac		
1964–1972	Sloboda Tuzla		

Managerial career
- 1973–1976: Sloboda Tuzla (assistant)
- 1976–1978: Sloboda Tuzla
- 1979–1981: Sloboda Tuzla
- 1981–1982: Budućnost Titograd
- Rad
- 1984–1985: Borac Banja Luka
- 1985–1986: Napredak Kruševac
- 1986–1987: Eskişehirspor
- 1987–1988: Sloboda Tuzla
- 1988–1989: Spartak Subotica
- 1990: Vardar
- 1991–1992: Zemun
- 1994: Obilić
- 1994–1995: Zemun
- 1996–1997: Loznica
- 1998–1999: Milicionar
- 1999: Hajduk Beograd
- 2000–2001: Milicionar
- * Club domestic league appearances and goals

Đorđe Gerum (Serbian Cyrillic: Ђорђе Герум; born 28 September 1940) is a Serbian former football manager and player.

== Playing career ==
Born in Pančevo, Gerum started playing football at his hometown club Dinamo, but soon joined the youth system of Partizan.

After spending several seasons with Radnički Kragujevac, Gerum moved to Sloboda Tuzla in 1964. He was a regular member of the team that won promotion to the Yugoslav First League in 1969. Two years later, Gerum helped the side reach the 1970–71 Yugoslav Cup final. He ended his playing career in the fall of 1972.

== Managerial career ==
After hanging up his boots, Gerum served as an assistant to Sloboda Tuzla manager Josip Duvančić for three years, before replacing him in the summer of 1976. He led the club to a third-place finish in his debut season in charge, securing a spot in the 1977–78 UEFA Cup.

In the summer of 1981, Gerum was appointed as manager of fellow Yugoslav First League side Budućnost Titograd. He subsequently managed three Yugoslav Second League clubs, namely Rad, Borac Banja Luka (1984–85), and Napredak Kruševac (1985–86).

In December 1986, Gerum went abroad to Turkey and took over at Eskişehirspor, but was dismissed in April 1987.
