= FK Rad =

Serbian football club

Rad
- Full name: FK Rad
- Nickname: Građevinari (The Builders)
- Founded: 10 March 1958; 68 years ago
- Ground: King Peter I Stadium
- Capacity: 6,000
- League: Belgrade Zone League
- 2025–26: Belgrade First League – Group C, 1st of 14 (promoted)
Home colours	Away colours	Third colours

FK Rad (Serbian Cyrillic: ФК Рад) is a football club based in Banjica, Belgrade, Serbia. They compete in the Belgrade Zone League, the fourth tier of the national league system. It plays it home games at the King Peter I Stadium.

Founded in 1958, the club spent a total of 30 seasons in the top flight between 1987 and 2021, including five seasons in the Yugoslav First League, 12 seasons in the First League of Serbia and Montenegro, and 13 seasons in the Serbian SuperLiga.

== History ==
The club was founded on 10 March 1958 by GP Rad, a local construction company. They acquired the league rights from FK Razvitak, a small club based in Banjica, going on to compete in the local leagues of Belgrade until the early 1970s. The club earned promotion to the Yugoslav Second League in 1973, spending the next 14 seasons in the second tier of Yugoslav football. They also reached the 1981–82 Yugoslav Cup quarter-finals, losing to Dinamo Zagreb.

In the 1986–87 Yugoslav Second League, the club became champions in Group East and took promotion to the Yugoslav First League for the first time in history. They placed 15th in their debut appearance in the top flight, just one point above the relegation zone. The club subsequently finished in fourth place in the 1988–89 season, earning a spot in the 1989–90 UEFA Cup. They were eliminated in the first round after losing 3–2 on aggregate to Olympiacos.

Following the dissolution of SFR Yugoslavia, the club continued to compete at the highest national level, finishing fifth in the inaugural 1992–93 First League of FR Yugoslavia. They would also place in the top five in three consecutive seasons from 1998 to 2000. With the beginning of the new millennium, the club slowly started to decline and eventually suffered relegation in the 2002–03 season. They returned to the top flight of Serbia and Montenegro football in its final edition, but were promptly relegated.

Having spent two seasons in the Serbian First League, the club placed fourth in 2007–08 and managed to earn promotion to the Serbian SuperLiga via the play-offs. They tied their highest-ever fourth-place finish in 2010–11, which earned them qualification for the 2011–12 UEFA Europa League, to return to European football after 22 years. After spending 13 consecutive seasons in the top flight, the club suffered relegation in 2021. They would subsequently end bottom of the table in the 2022–23 Serbian First League, dropping to the third tier for the first time in 50 years.

After suffering a second consecutive relegation in 2024, the club found itself in the Belgrade Zone League, the fourth tier of Serbian football. They were also banned from registering any new players during the 2024–25 season due to outstanding debts. As a result, the club was unable to prevent a third successive relegation, losing all of its games, except for two forfeited wins, and conceding 170 goals to drop to the Belgrade First League.

== Honours ==
Yugoslav Second League (Tier 2)

- 1986–87 (Group East)

== Seasons ==
Season	League									Cup	Continental
Season	Division	Pld	W	D	L	GF	GA	Pts	Pos	Cup	Continental
Yugoslavia
1973–74	2 – East	34	11	10	13	33	40	32	14th	—	—
1974–75	2 – East	34	12	12	10	64	42	36	6th	—	—
1975–76	2 – East	34	16	11	7	48	34	43	2nd	—	—
1976–77	2 – East	34	14	8	12	41	29	36	7th	Round of 16	—
1977–78	2 – East	34	11	11	12	34	36	33	11th	—	—
1978–79	2 – East	30	7	14	9	26	29	28	10th	—	—
1979–80	2 – East	30	12	7	11	41	40	31	9th	Round of 32	—
1980–81	2 – East	30	12	9	9	27	21	33	3rd	—	—
1981–82	2 – East	30	11	9	10	37	32	31	7th	Quarter-finals	—
1982–83	2 – East	34	15	5	14	52	46	35	7th	—	—
1983–84	2 – East	34	10	11	13	32	38	31	13th	—	—
1984–85	2 – East	34	13	9	12	34	33	35	5th	Round of 32	—
1985–86	2 – East	34	19	13	2	53	20	51	2nd	Round of 16	—
1986–87	2 – East	34	20	9	5	54	15	49	1st	—	—
1987–88	1	34	11	8	15	44	56	30	15th	—	—
1988–89	1	34	13	11	10	46	38	35	4th	Round of 32	Intertoto Cup – Group stage
1989–90	1	34	16	6	12	41	31	36	5th	Round of 16	UEFA Cup – First round
1990–91	1	36	14	7	15	42	34	32	8th	Round of 32	—
1991–92	1	33	14	3	16	48	43	29	7th	Quarter-finals	—
Serbia and Montenegro
1992–93	1	36	13	13	10	47	35	39	5th	Round of 32	—
1993–94	1 – I/A	18	7	3	8	16	19	17	7th	Round of 16	—
1993–94	1 – I/B	18	9	7	2	28	10	25	1st	Round of 16	—
1994–95	1 – I/A	18	6	7	5	16	16	19	4th	Round of 16	—
1994–95	1 – I/A	18	4	6	8	22	38	22	7th	Round of 16	—
1995–96	1 – I/B	18	9	5	4	32	12	32	2nd	Quarter-finals	—
1995–96	1 – I/A	18	5	5	8	21	23	28	7th	Quarter-finals	—
1996–97	1 – I/A	33	10	10	13	33	38	40	9th	Quarter-finals	—
1997–98	1 – I/A	33	12	6	15	35	39	42	5th	Round of 16	—
1998–99	1	24 (Note: The season was cut short due to the NATO bombing of Yugoslavia.)	11	7	6	26	26	40	5th	Quarter-finals	—
1999–2000	1	40	17	9	14	56	46	60	4th	Round of 32	—
2000–01	1	34	12	5	17	49	58	41	14th	Round of 32	—
2001–02	1	34	13	7	14	45	41	46	10th	Round of 16	—
2002–03	1	34	11	10	13	39	43	43	13th	Round of 32	—
2003–04	2 – North	36	22	9	5	62	28	75	2nd	Round of 16	—
2004–05	2 – Serbia	38	21	8	9	64	30	71	3rd	Semi-finals	—
2005–06	1	30	9	4	17	27	35	31	13th	Round of 32	—
Serbia
2006–07	2	38	18	8	12	53	34	62	5th	Round of 32	—
2007–08	2	34	16	9	9	50	34	57	4th	Round of 32	—
2008–09	1	33	7	15	11	27	35	36	8th	Round of 16	—
2009–10	1	30	10	7	13	38	39	37	8th	Round of 32	—
2010–11	1	30	14	10	6	38	21	52	4th	Round of 16	—
2011–12	1	30	10	7	13	33	31	37	10th	Round of 32	Europa League – First qualifying round
2012–13	1	30	12	8	10	32	30	44	7th	Quarter-finals	—
2013–14	1	30	8	5	17	19	37	29	14th	Round of 32	—
2014–15	1	30	13	4	13	33	38	43	6th	Quarter-finals	—
2015–16	1	37	9	13	15	40	47	27	12th	Round of 32	—
2016–17	1	37	11	9	17	29	45	25	11th	Round of 16	—
2017–18	1	37	10	6	21	40	64	26	13th	Round of 16	—
2018–19	1	37	7	12	18	22	44	23	13th	Round of 32	—
2019–20	1	30 (Note: The season was shortened due to the COVID-19 pandemic in Serbia.)	4	3	23	23	63	15	15th	Round of 32	—
2020–21	1	38	14	6	18	44	57	48	15th	Round of 16	—
2021–22	2	37	13	9	15	40	41	48	11th	Quarter-finals	—
2022–23	2	37	5	15	17	37	63	30	16th	Round of 32	—
2023–24	3 – Belgrade	30	4	4	22	20	63	10 (Note: The club was docked six points.)	16th	Preliminary round	—
2024–25	4 – Belgrade	26	2	0	24	8	170	4 (Note: The club was docked two points.)	13th	—	—

== European record ==
Season	Competition	Round	Opponent	Score	Aggregate
1989–90	UEFA Cup	First round	(Greece) Olympiacos	2–1 (H), 0–2 (A)	2–3
2011–12	Europa League	First qualifying round	(San Marino) Tre Penne	6–0 (H), 3–1 (A)	9–1
2011–12	Europa League	Second qualifying round	(Greece) Olympiacos Volos	0–1 (H), 1–1 (A)	1–2

== Stadium ==
The home ground on FK Rad since 1977 is the King Peter I Stadium, with seating capacity of 3,919 seats and total capacity of 6,000.

== Supporters ==
The club's main supporters' group, known as United Force, was formed in 1987. They have often been associated with hooliganism due to their long history of incidents. Rad supporters have rivalries with several clubs, including local rivalries with OFK Beograd and Voždovac, and national rivalries with Novi Pazar.

== Players ==
=== First-team squad ===
As of 23 September 2025

Note: Flags indicate national team as defined under FIFA eligibility rules; some limited exceptions apply. Players may hold more than one non-FIFA nationality.

No.	Pos.	Nation	Player
1	GK	SRB	Luka Martinović
2	DF	SRB	Aleksandar Pantić
4	DF	SRB	Stefan Kovač
5	DF	SRB	Miloš Tanović
6	FW	SRB	Aleksandar Deljanin
7	DF	SRB	Miloš Marković
8	DF	SRB	Nikola Petković
9	FW	SRB	Nemanja Nenadović
10	MF	SRB	Nenad Trajković
12	GK	SRB	Andrija Nikolić
13	DF	SRB	Marko Stoiljković
19	MF	SRB	Milan Smiljanić

No.	Pos.	Nation	Player
20	FW	SRB	Andrija Kaluđerović
21	MF	SRB	Branislav Milošević
22	MF	SRB	Saša Jovanović
23	DF	SRB	Miljan Šoškić
25	DF	MNE	Vladimir Volkov
26	MF	SRB	Vukašin Stevanović
27	DF	SRB	Tomislav Pajović
28	GK	SRB	Aleksa Klajić
30	FW	SRB	Vuk Janković
31	FW	SRB	Darko Bjedov
32	DF	SRB	Milan Perendija (captain)
33	DF	SRB	Nikola Raspopović

=== Notable players ===
This is a list of players who have played at full international level.

- (Bosnia and Herzegovina) Petar Jelić
- (Bosnia and Herzegovina) Aleksandar Kosorić
- (Bosnia and Herzegovina) Nenad Mišković
- (Canada) Milan Borjan
- (China) Li Chunyu
- (Croatia) Ivan Cvjetković
- (Cyprus) Siniša Gogić
- (Montenegro) Nikola Drinčić
- (Montenegro) Uroš Đurđević
- (Montenegro) Vladimir Gluščević
- (Montenegro) Filip Kasalica
- (Montenegro) Mitar Novaković
- (Montenegro) Vladimir Rodić
- (Montenegro) Nikola Šipčić
- (Montenegro) (Serbia) Vladimir Volkov
- (Montenegro) Nikola Vujnović
- (North Macedonia) Dejvi Glavevski
- (North Macedonia) Aleksandar Lazevski
- (North Macedonia) Perica Stančeski
- (North Macedonia) Goran Stanić
- (North Macedonia) Ostoja Stjepanović
- (North Macedonia) Aleksandar Todorovski
- (Serbia) Veljko Birmančević
- (Serbia) Miloš Bogunović
- (Serbia) Aleksandar Busnić
- (Serbia) Jovan Damjanović
- (Serbia) Filip Đorđević
- (Serbia) Igor Đurić
- (Serbia) Brana Ilić
- (Serbia) Bojan Isailović
- (Serbia) Bojan Jorgačević
- (Serbia) Aleksandar Jovanović
- (Serbia) Branislav Jovanović
- (Serbia) Damir Kahriman
- (Serbia) Andrija Kaluđerović
- (Serbia) Filip Kljajić
- (Serbia) Nenad Lukić
- (Serbia) Nikola Maraš
- (Serbia) Marko Mijailović
- (Serbia) Luka Milivojević
- (Serbia) Bogdan Mladenović
- (Serbia) Pavle Ninkov
- (Serbia) Ognjen Ožegović
- (Serbia) Andrija Pavlović
- (Serbia) Nemanja Pejčinović
- (Serbia) Milan Smiljanić
- (Serbia) Miloš Stanojević
- (Serbia) Nikola Stojiljković
- (Serbia) Nenad Tomović
- (Serbia) Slobodan Urošević
- (Serbia) Jagoš Vuković
- (Serbia and Montenegro) Nenad Brnović
- (Serbia and Montenegro) Goran Bunjevčević
- (Serbia and Montenegro) Željko Cicović
- (Serbia and Montenegro) Petar Divić
- (Serbia and Montenegro) Boban Dmitrović
- (Serbia and Montenegro) Ljubinko Drulović
- (Serbia and Montenegro) (Socialist Federal Republic of Yugoslavia) Miroslav Đukić
- (Serbia and Montenegro) Nenad Grozdić
- (Serbia and Montenegro) Spira Grujić
- (Serbia and Montenegro) (Socialist Federal Republic of Yugoslavia) Vladimir Jugović
- (Serbia and Montenegro) Zoran Mirković
- (Serbia and Montenegro) Predrag Ocokoljić
- (Serbia and Montenegro) Aleksandar Pantić
- (Serbia and Montenegro) Marko Perović
- (Serbia and Montenegro) Dejan Rađenović
- (Serbia and Montenegro) Vuk Rašović
- (Serbia and Montenegro) Predrag Ristović
- (Serbia and Montenegro) Borislav Stevanović
- (Serbia and Montenegro) Miroslav Stević
- (Serbia and Montenegro) Dragan Vukmir
- (Serbia and Montenegro) Aleksandar Živković
- (Socialist Federal Republic of Yugoslavia) Ivan Golac
- (Socialist Federal Republic of Yugoslavia) Jusuf Hatunić
- (Socialist Federal Republic of Yugoslavia) Mihailo Petrović
- (Socialist Federal Republic of Yugoslavia) Vladan Radača
- (Socialist Federal Republic of Yugoslavia) Vlada Stošić
- (Socialist Federal Republic of Yugoslavia) Ilija Zavišić

For a list of all FK Rad players with a Wikipedia article, see Category:FK Rad players.

== Managerial history ==
Period	Name
	(Socialist Federal Republic of Yugoslavia) Mirko Damjanović
1979–1980	(Socialist Federal Republic of Yugoslavia) Milan Živadinović
1982-1983	(Socialist Federal Republic of Yugoslavia) Đorđe Gerum
1984	(Socialist Federal Republic of Yugoslavia) Marko Valok
1985–1987	(Socialist Federal Republic of Yugoslavia) Žarko Nedeljković
1987–1989	(Socialist Federal Republic of Yugoslavia) Dragan Gugleta
1989	(Socialist Federal Republic of Yugoslavia) Ivica Brzić
1990	(Socialist Federal Republic of Yugoslavia) Ljupko Petrović
1990	(Socialist Federal Republic of Yugoslavia) Dragutin Spasojević
1990–1991	(Socialist Federal Republic of Yugoslavia) Dragan Gugleta
1991–1994	(Serbia and Montenegro) Tomislav Manojlović
1994–1995	(Serbia and Montenegro) Boško Antić
1995–1997	(Serbia and Montenegro) Milenko Kiković
1997–1999	(Serbia and Montenegro) Čedomir Đoinčević
2000	(Serbia and Montenegro) Nebojša Petrović
2001	(Serbia and Montenegro) Čedomir Đoinčević
2002	(Serbia and Montenegro) Zvonko Varga
2002–2003	(North Macedonia) Boško Đurovski
2003	(Serbia and Montenegro) Milan Milanović
2004	(Serbia and Montenegro) Zdravko Zemunović
2004–2005	(Serbia and Montenegro) Radmilo Ivančević
2005	(Serbia and Montenegro) Čedomir Đoinčević
2005–2006	(Serbia and Montenegro) Bogdan Korak

Period	Name
2006	(Serbia) Dragan Kecman
2006–2007	(Serbia) Aleksandar Janjić
2007	(Serbia) Nebojša Vignjević
2007	(Serbia) Dragan Kecman
2008	(Serbia) Mihailo Ivanović
2008	(Serbia) Aleksandar Janjić
2008–2011	(Serbia) Marko Nikolić
2011	(Serbia) Predrag Rogan (caretaker)
2011	(Serbia) Slavko Petrović
2011	(Serbia) Milan Bosanac (caretaker)
2011–2012	(Serbia) Nebojša Vignjević
2012	(Serbia) Radoje Smiljanić (caretaker)
2012–2013	(Serbia) Marko Nikolić
2013	(Serbia) Nebojša Milošević
2013	(Serbia) Nebojša Petrović
2014	(Serbia) Aleksandar Janković
2014	(Serbia) Stevan Mojsilović
2014	(Serbia) Slađan Nikolić (caretaker)
2014–2016	(Serbia) Milan Milanović
2016	(Serbia) Slađan Nikolić (caretaker)
2016	(Serbia) Aleksandar Janjić
2016	(Serbia) Slađan Nikolić (caretaker)
2016–2017	(Serbia) Nebojša Petrović

Period	Name
2017	(Serbia) Gordan Petrić
2017–2018	(Serbia) Slađan Nikolić
2018	(Serbia) Zoran Milinković
2018–2019	(Serbia) Dragan Stevanović
2019	(Bosnia and Herzegovina) Zvezdan Milošević
2019	(Serbia) Bogdan Korak
2019	(Serbia) Srđan Stojčevski (caretaker)
2019	(Montenegro) Dragan Radojičić
2020	(Serbia) Marko Mićović
2020	(Serbia) Branko Mirjačić
2020	(Serbia) Zoran Njeguš
2020–2021	(Serbia) Milan Milanović
2021	(Serbia) Dragan Ivanović
2021–2022	(Serbia) Zoran Rendulić
2022	(Serbia) Branko Mirjačić
2022	(Serbia) Bogdan Korak
2023	(Serbia) Igor Savić
2023	(Serbia) Goran Serafimović
2023–2024	(Serbia) Dejan Musović
2024–2026	(Serbia) Bogdan Korak
