= Milan Milanović (footballer, born 1963) =

Serbian football manager and player

Personal information
- Date of birth: 10 January 1963 (age 63)
- Place of birth: Belgrade, PR Serbia, FPR Yugoslavia
- Position: Midfielder

Youth career
- Partizan

Senior career*
Years	Team	Apps	(Gls)
1983–1984	Čukarički		
1984–1986	Zemun	60	(7)
1986	Radnički Niš	0	(0)
1987	Zemun		
1988–1989	FC Augsburg	3	(0)
1989–1990	Spartak Subotica	6	(0)
1990–1991	Stahl Eisenhüttenstadt	5	(0)
1991–1992	FC Gütersloh	9	(0)
1992–1993	Sachsen Leipzig	17	(2)
1993–1994	Wismut Gera	15	(2)
1997–1998	VB	23	(2)
Total		138+	(13+)

Managerial career
- 1997–1998: VB (player-manager)
- 1999–2000: Zemun
- 2002–2003: Rad (assistant)
- 2003–2004: Rad
- 2005: TB
- 2006: Jedinstvo Ub
- 2006–2007: Rad (sporting director)
- 2008: OFK Beograd (assistant)
- 2009: Laktaši
- 2011–2012: Sheriff Tiraspol (assistant)
- 2012: Sheriff Tiraspol
- 2012–2013: Hajduk Kula
- 2013: Novi Pazar
- 2013–2014: OFK Beograd
- 2014: Radnički Niš
- 2014–2016: Rad
- 2016–2018: Zemun
- 2018–2019: Radnik Surdulica
- 2019–2020: Irtysh Pavlodar
- 2020–2021: Rad
- 2021: Novi Pazar
- 2021: Alashkert
- 2022: Mačva Šabac
- 2022: Tobol
- 2023: Spartak Subotica
- 2023: Radnik Surdulica
- 2024: Mezőkövesdi SE
- * Club domestic league appearances and goals

Milan Milanović (Serbian Cyrillic: Милан Милановић; born 10 January 1963) is a Serbian football manager and former player.

== Playing career ==
After coming through the youth system of Partizan, Milanović played for Zemun in the Yugoslav Second League. He later spent multiple years in Germany, playing for five clubs in the lower leagues. In 1997, Milanović moved to the Faroe Islands and served as player-manager of VB for two seasons.

== Managerial career ==
After returning to his homeland, Milanović was manager of Zemun in the First League of FR Yugoslavia. He later served as an assistant to Boško Đurovski at Rad, before replacing him in May 2003. After the club suffered relegation from the top flight, Milanović continued managing the team in the Second League until January 2004.

In June 2009, Milanović was named as new manager of Laktaši in the Premier League of Bosnia and Herzegovina, but left the club before the end of the year. He later went to Moldova and became an assistant to Vitali Rashkevich at Sheriff Tiraspol. In May 2012, Milanović replaced Rashkevich as manager.

In July 2014, Milanović took charge as manager of Serbian SuperLiga side Rad, returning to the club after a decade elsewhere. He was discharged from his position in April 2016. In August 2016, Milanović became manager of Zemun for the second time, guiding them to a second-place finish in the Serbian First League and promotion to the top flight after 10 seasons. He decided to leave the club in August 2018.

In June 2019, Milanović was appointed as manager of Kazakhstan Premier League side Irtysh Pavlodar.

In September 2021, Milanović was announced as new manager of Armenian Premier League club Alashkert.

In May 2022, Milanović returned to Kazakhstan to take charge of Tobol.
