= Belgrade First League =

- Country: Serbia
- Number of clubs: 12–14 (2013–present)
- Level on pyramid: 5
- Promotion to: Belgrade Zone League
- Relegation to: Belgrade Second League
- Domestic cup: Serbian Cup
- Current champions: FK Sremčica (group A); Napredak Medoševac (group B); FK Beljina (group C) (2024–25)

Belgrade First League (Serbian: Прва београдска лига / Prva beogradska liga) is one of the fifth-tier divisions of the Serbian football league system. It is run by the Football Association of Belgrade.

Since the 2013–14 season, the league is divided into three groups (A, B, and C).

== Seasons ==
=== 2006–2013 ===
Season	Winner
2006–07	Kovačevac
2007–08	Lasta
2008–09	Balkan Mirijevo
2009–10	Radnički Rudovci
2010–11	Železnik
2011–12	IMR
2012–13	Vrčin

=== 2013–present ===
Season	Winner		
Season	Group A	Group B	Group C
2013–14	Jedinstvo Surčin	Stepojevac	Boleč
2014–15	BSK Batajnica	Prva Iskra Barič	Torlak
2015–16	Milutinac Zemun	Budućnost Zvečka	Avala Beli Potok
2016–17	Brodarac	TEK Sloga Veliki Crljeni	Leštane
2017–18	Studentski Grad	BSK Baćevac	Mladenovac
2018–19	Dunav Veliko Selo	Mladost Cvetovac	Vrčin
2019–20	Poštar Zvezdara	Posavina Stubline	Vinča
2020–21	PKB Padinska Skela	Zvezda Konatice	Zuce
