= Belgrade Zone League =

- Country: Serbia
- Number of clubs: 14
- Level on pyramid: 4
- Promotion to: Serbian League Belgrade
- Relegation to: Belgrade First League
- Domestic cup: Serbian Cup
- Current champions: Torlak (2024–25)
- Most championships: Lokomotiva Beograd (3 titles)

Belgrade Zone League (Serbian: Зонска лига Београд / Zonska liga Beograd) is one of the Serbian Zone League divisions, the fourth tier of the Serbian football league system. It is run by the Football Association of Belgrade.

The league comprises 14 teams. The top two teams are promoted to the Serbian League Belgrade and the bottom two teams are relegated to the Belgrade First League.

== Seasons ==
Season	Winner	Runner-up
2002–03	Polet Mirosaljci	Sopot
2003–04	Kolubara	Pekar Beograd
2004–05	Srem Jakovo	Sinđelić Beograd
2005–06	Palilulac Beograd	Milutinac Zemun
2006–07	Lokomotiva Beograd	Šumadija Jagnjilo
2007–08	Lisović	PKB Padinska Skela
2008–09	Grafičar Beograd	Kovačevac
2009–10	Žarkovo	Balkan Mirijevo
2010–11	Slavija Beograd	PKB Padinska Skela
2011–12	Budućnost Dobanovci	Železnik
2012–13	Lokomotiva Beograd	IMR
2013–14	IMT	Polet Beograd
2014–15	Stepojevac	Crvena Zvezda Mali Mokri Lug
2015–16	Grafičar Beograd	BSK Batajnica
2016–17	Lokomotiva Beograd	Jedinstvo Surčin
2017–18	Brodarac	Zvezdara
2018–19	TEK Sloga Veliki Crljeni	Mladenovac
2019–20	Canceled due to the COVID-19 pandemic	
2020–21	Prva Iskra Barič	Borac Lazarevac
2021–22	Torlak	Sinđelić Beograd
2022–23	PKB Padinska Skela	GSP Polet Dorćol
2023–24	OFK Budućnost Dudovica	KFK Ravna Gora
2024–25	Torlak	Budućnost Dobanovci
