= 2006–07 Red Star Belgrade season =

Red Star Belgrade
2006–07 season
- Chairman: Dragan Stojković
- Manager: Dušan Bajević (until 10 March); Boško Gjurovski (from 10 March)
- Serbian SuperLiga: 1st
- Serbian Cup: Winners
- UEFA Champions League: Third qualifying round
- UEFA Cup: First round
- Top goalscorer: League: Dušan Đokić (14); All: Dušan Đokić (16)

During the 2006–07 season, Red Star Belgrade participated in the 2006–07 Serbian SuperLiga, 2006–07 Serbian Cup, 2006–07 UEFA Champions League qualifying rounds and 2006–07 UEFA Cup.

== Season summary ==
Red Star won their tenth double in this season.

== Squad ==
Name	Serbian SuperLiga		Serbian Cup		UEFA Champions League		UEFA Cup		Total	
Name	Apps	Goals	Apps	Goals	Apps	Goals	Apps	Goals	Apps	Goals
Goalkeepers
(Serbia) Ivan Ranđelović	23	0	3	0	4	0	2	0	32	0
(Montenegro) Zoran Banović	7	0	0	0	0	0	0	0	7	0
(Serbia) Saša Radivojević	3	0	2	0	0	0	0	0	5	0
Defenders
(Serbia) Dušan Anđelković	24	1	5	0	1	0	1	0	31	1
(Senegal) Ibrahima Gueye	24	0	3	0	2	0	1	0	30	0
(Serbia) Aleksandar Pantić	21	0	0	0	4	0	2	0	27	0
(Serbia) Dušan Basta	16	0	4	1	4	0	0	0	24	1
(Serbia) Đorđe Tutorić	15	0	2	0	1	0	1	0	19	0
(Serbia) Nebojša Joksimović	9	0	3	1	2	0	0	0	14	1
(Serbia) Miloš Bajalica	9	0	1	0	0	0	0	0	10	0
(Serbia) Vladimir Đorđević	5	0	1	0	0	0	0	0	6	0
(Serbia) Bojan Miladinović	3	0	1	0	0	0	0	0	4	0
Midfielders
(Serbia) Nenad Milijaš	25	5	5	1	2	0	2	0	34	6
(Serbia) Dejan Milovanović	23	3	5	1	4	1	2	0	34	5
(Ecuador) Segundo Castillo	23	8	2	0	0	0	2	0	27	8
(Bulgaria) Blagoy Georgiev	20	2	1	0	4	0	2	0	27	2
(Serbia) Aleksandar Trišović	21	0	4	1	0	0	1	0	26	1
(Serbia) Marko Perović	18	0	1	0	4	0	2	0	25	0
(Serbia) Nikola Trajković	17	0	3	0	0	0	1	0	21	0
(Montenegro) Igor Burzanović	13	3	2	0	0	0	0	0	15	3
(Serbia) Ognjen Koroman	12	2	3	1	0	0	0	0	15	3
(Serbia) Nenad Srećković	2	0	0	0	0	0	0	0	2	0
(Serbia) Marko Nikolić	1	0	0	0	0	0	0	0	1	0
Forwards
(Serbia) Dušan Đokić	28	14	3	1	4	1	2	0	37	16
(Montenegro) Milan Purović	22	6	5	1	3	0	2	0	32	7
(Serbia) Milanko Rašković	13	3	4	2	0	0	0	0	17	5
(Brazil) Ely Thadeu	10	0	1	0	0	0	1	0	12	0
(Serbia) Miloš Reljić	1	1	0	0	0	0	0	0	1	1
(Serbia) Slavko Perović	1	0	0	0	0	0	0	0	1	0
Players sold or loaned out during the season
(Serbia) Boško Janković	2	0	0	0	4	0	0	0	6	0
(Serbia) Nikola Žigić	3	2	0	0	4	2	0	0	7	4
(Serbia) Nenad Kovačević	3	0	0	0	4	0	0	0	7	0
(Serbia) Milan Biševac	14	2	1	0	4	0	2	0	21	2
(Japan) Takayuki Suzuki	0	0	2	0	0	0	0	0	2	0
(Serbia) Goran Adamović	1	0	0	0	0	0	0	0	1	0
(Serbia) Radovan Krivokapić	3	0	2	0	1	0	0	0	6	0
(Brazil) Aílton	11	3	0	0	0	0	2	1	13	4

== Results ==
=== Overview ===
Competition	Record							
Competition	P	W	D	L	GF	GA	GD	Win %
Serbian SuperLiga	32	23	5	4	55	27	+28	71.88
Serbian Cup	5	5	0	0	10	1	+9	100.00
UEFA Champions League	4	2	0	2	5	3	+2	50.00
UEFA Cup	2	0	0	2	1	4	−3	0.00
Total	43	30	5	8	71	35	+36	69.77

=== Serbian SuperLiga ===
First stage
Pos	Team	Pld	W	D	L	GF	GA	GD	Pts	Qualification
1	Red Star Belgrade	22	16	3	3	37	16	+21	51	Qualification for championship round
2	Partizan	22	13	3	6	32	20	+12	42	Qualification for championship round
3	Vojvodina	22	11	4	7	23	16	+7	37	Qualification for championship round
4	Mladost Apatin	22	9	8	5	19	13	+6	35	Qualification for championship round
5	Hajduk Kula	22	11	2	9	21	21	0	35	Qualification for championship round

Source: RSSSF.org
Rules for classification: 1) points; 2) goal difference; 3) number of goals scored.

Championship group
Pos	Team	Pld	W	D	L	GF	GA	GD	Pts	Qualification
1	Red Star Belgrade (C)	32	23	5	4	55	27	+28	74	Qualification for Champions League second qualifying round
2	Partizan	32	18	3	11	47	31	+16	57	Qualification for UEFA Cup first qualifying round
3	Vojvodina	32	16	6	10	38	25	+13	54	Qualification for UEFA Cup first qualifying round
4	Bežanija	32	12	12	8	36	31	+5	48	Qualification for UEFA Cup first qualifying round
5	Hajduk Kula	32	14	4	14	29	30	−1	46	Qualification for Intertoto Cup second round
6	Mladost Apatin	32	11	8	13	25	33	−8	41	

Source: RSSSF.org
Rules for classification: 1) points; 2) goal difference; 3) number of goals scored.
(C) Champions

Date	Opponent	Venue	Result	Scorers
5 August 2006	Voždovac	H	2–0	Đokić (2)
13 August 2006	Smederevo	H	1–0	Žigić (pen.)
27 August 2006	Hajduk Kula	H	3–1	Đokić, Georgiev, Žigić
10 September 2006	Borac Čačak	A	2–0	Aílton, Đokić
17 September 2006	Bežanija	H	1–1	Biševac
20 September 2006	Zemun	A	2–1	Castillo, Rašković
23 September 2006	Partizan	A	0–0	
1 October 2006	Banat Zrenjanin	H	2–0	Aílton, Purović
14 October 2006	Vojvodina	A	1–0	Đokić
21 October 2006	OFK Beograd	H	1–0	Castillo
29 October 2006	Mladost Apatin	A	1–0	Milovanović
4 November 2006	Voždovac	A	0–2	
12 November 2006	Smederevo	A	2–1	Castillo, Đokić
18 November 2006	Zemun	H	5–0	Milovanović, Anđelković, Castillo, Đokić (pen.), Biševac (pen.)
26 November 2006	Hajduk Kula	A	2–0	Aílton, Đokić
2 December 2006	Borac Čačak	H	2–1	Đokić (2)
18 February 2007	Bežanija	A	1–1	Burzanović
24 February 2007	Partizan	H	2–4	Castillo, Burzanović
3 March 2007	Banat Zrenjanin	A	4–1	Castillo (2), Đokić, Milijaš
10 March 2007	Vojvodina	H	0–3	
17 March 2007	OFK Beograd	A	1–0	Milijaš
1 April 2007	Mladost Apatin	H	2–0	Purović, Đokić
7 April 2007	Bežanija	H	1–3	Koroman
11 April 2007	Partizan	H	1–0	Purović
14 April 2007	Vojvodina	A	0–0	
21 April 2007	Mladost Apatin	H	2–1	Purović (2)
28 April 2007	Hajduk Kula	A	2–1	Purović, Milijaš
2 May 2007	Bežanija	A	4–2	Koroman, Đokić (2), Rašković
5 May 2007	Partizan	A	2–1	Burzanović, Milijaš (pen.)
11 May 2007	Vojvodina	H	4–2	Milovanović, Georgiev, Castillo, Rašković
19 May 2007	Mladost Apatin	A	1–0	Reljić
26 May 2007	Hajduk Kula	H	1–1	Milijaš

=== Serbian Cup ===
Date	Opponent	Venue	Result	Scorers
25 October 2006	Sevojno	H	3–0	Rašković (2), Basta
8 November 2006	Mokra Gora	A	2–1	Joksimović, Milovanović
14 March 2007	Čukarički	A	2–0	Purović, Trišović
18 April 2007	Partizan	H	1–0	Milijaš
15 May 2007	Vojvodina	N	2–0	Koroman, Đokić

=== UEFA Champions League ===
==== Second qualifying round ====
26 July 2006	Cork City (Republic of Ireland)	0–1	(Serbia) Red Star Belgrade	Turners Cross, Cork
		Report	Behan 37' (o.g.)	Attendance: 5,500; Referee: Tomasz Mikulski (Poland)

2 August 2006	Red Star Belgrade (Serbia)	3–0 (4–0 agg.)	(Republic of Ireland) Cork City	Red Star Stadium, Belgrade
	Milovanović 3'; Žigić 34', 59'	Report		Attendance: 27,000; Referee: Knut Kircher (Germany)

==== Third qualifying round ====
9 August 2006	Milan (Italy)	1–0	(Serbia) Red Star Belgrade	San Siro, Milan
	Inzaghi 22'	Report		Attendance: 70,510; Referee: Jan Wegereef (Netherlands)

22 August 2006	Red Star Belgrade (Serbia)	1–2 (1–3 agg.)	(Italy) Milan	Red Star Stadium, Belgrade
	Đokić 80'	Report	Inzaghi 29'; Seedorf 78'	Attendance: 55,000; Referee: Claus Bo Larsen (Denmark)

=== UEFA Cup ===
==== First round ====
14 September 2006	Slovan Liberec (Czech Republic)	2–0	(Serbia) Red Star Belgrade	Stadion u Nisy, Liberec
	Frejlach 43'; Blažek 90'	Report		Attendance: 7,250; Referee: Craig Thomson (Scotland)

28 September 2006	Red Star Belgrade (Serbia)	1–2 (1–4 agg.)	(Czech Republic) Slovan Liberec	Red Star Stadium, Belgrade
	Aílton 43'	Report	Bílek 2'; Holenda 67'	Attendance: 17,000; Referee: Claudio Circhetta (Switzerland)

== See also ==
- List of Red Star Belgrade seasons
