= Nebojša Joksimović =

Nebojša Joksimović may refer to:

- Nebojša Joksimović (footballer) (born 1981), Serbian football player
- Nebojša Joksimović (basketball) (born 1981), Slovenian basketball player
