= Nenad Milijaš =

Serbian footballer (born 1983)

Personal information
- Full name: Nenad Milijaš
- Date of birth: 30 April 1983 (age 43)
- Place of birth: Belgrade, SR Serbia, SFR Yugoslavia
- Height: 1.88 m (6 ft 2 in)
- Position: Midfielder

Team information
- Current team: TSC (head coach)

Youth career
- 1995–2000: Zemun

Senior career*
Years	Team	Apps	(Gls)
2000–2005	Zemun	129	(17)
2006–2009	Red Star Belgrade	97	(37)
2009–2012	Wolverhampton Wanderers	62	(4)
2012–2014	Red Star Belgrade	58	(20)
2014–2015	Manisaspor	18	(7)
2015–2016	Hebei China Fortune	29	(13)
2016–2017	Nei Mongol Zhongyou	27	(3)
2017–2019	Red Star Belgrade	46	(0)
Total		466	(101)

International career
2008–2011	Serbia	25	(4)

Managerial career
- 2019–2023: Red Star Belgrade (assistant)
- 2023–2026: Red Star Belgrade (youth)
- 2026–: TSC
- * Club domestic league appearances and goals

Nenad Milijaš (Serbian: Ненад Милијаш, pronounced [něnad mîlijaʃ]; born 30 April 1983) is a Serbian former footballer who played as a midfielder. He represented Serbia at the 2010 FIFA World Cup.

Milijaš began his career with FK Zemun before moving to Red Star Belgrade, where he won league and cup honours. Having gained individual awards for his performances at Red Star Belgrade, Milijaš broke into the Serbian national side in 2008. He signed for Premier League club Wolverhampton Wanderers in 2009, before returning to his former club twice in 2012 and 2017.

== Club career ==
=== Early career in Serbia ===
Milijaš began his playing career in the youth ranks of Belgrade-based FK Zemun, where he progressed through to make it into their first team in 2000. He really began to establish himself in the middle of the park during the 2001–02 season and was a vital player for the club over the following seasons. In the 2005–06 season, he had his best goal-scoring start to a season, netting eight times by Christmas. This attracted attention from the country's biggest club and local rival, Red Star Belgrade.

Following his continuous impressive form for FK Zemun, Milijaš signed for Red Star Belgrade in January 2006. He ended his first season with Belgrade by winning both the Serbian Superliga and Serbian Cup with his new club. Milijaš won both trophies again with Red Star Belgrade the following season. He found appearances restricted by then-coach Dusan Bajević, but gained more playing time with the arrival of Boško Djurovski as the club's then-new coach. Milijaš was later promoted to the first team as a central midfielder for the following seasons, becoming a key member of the team as they went close to more domestic honours and regularly competing in European competitions. In the 2008–09 Serbian Superliga, he became Red Star Belgrade's top goalscorer with 18 league goals, 22 goals in all competitions, making him Serbian football's leading scorer in that season. Milijaš also won the league's Most Valuable Player Award, was voted into the All Star Team, named 2008–09 Serbian Superliga Player of the Year, and broke into the Serbia national football team. This form attracted attention from various clubs in Europe.

=== Wolverhampton Wanderers ===
On 15 June 2009, Milijaš signed for newly-promoted Premier League club Wolverhampton Wonderers on a four-year contract for an undisclosed fee, approximately £2.6 million. He made his debut in August during the club's 2–0 opening day defeat against West Ham, in which he was voted Sky Sports' man of the match. Milijaš scored his first goal for Wolves with a long-distance strike to earn a 2–1 home victory against Bolton in December 2009; before netting a second and final goal for the season against Burnley two weeks later.

Milijaš made twenty appearances in the Premier League in the 2010–11 season, scoring twice. He also matched that tally in the League Cup, scoring two penalties against Southend and Notts County. In a 3–3 home draw against Tottenham Hotspur, Milijaš created two goals by assisting Kevin Doyle's opening goal, and then winning a penalty for a second Doyle goal. He was also featured in the team's victory at Aston Villa as Wolves almost stayed up on the final day of the season.

Milijaš made only sporadic appearances during the next season, but became a starter in November and December. However, this was halted when he was sent off in a 1–1 draw against Arsenal for a challenge on Mikel Arteta in December 2011. Wolves made an appeal to have this red card rescinded, including a unique press conference by then-manager Mick McCarthy who showed slow motion replays from a number of angles, but the appeal was unsuccessful and the three-match ban was upheld. Following this dismissal he only made several substitute appearances in the final months as the club were relegated under caretaker manager Terry Connor.

Following the appointment of Ståle Solbakken as coach of Wolves at the end of season, it was announced that Milijaš was available for transfer, having expressed a desire to play more regularly. On 30 August, his contract was terminated by mutual consent, allowing him to find a new club.

=== Return to Red Star Belgrade ===
On 31 August 2012, one day after his departure from Wolves, Milijaš rejoined his former club Red Star Belgrade when he signed a three-year deal. He scored his first goal against Radnički Kragujevac 1923 from a free-kick. On 13 April 2013, Milijaš scored a hat-trick against Spartak Subotica.

=== Later career ===
On 16 February 2015, Milijaš transferred to China League One club Hebei China Fortune. On 14 February 2016, he transferred to fellow Nei Mongol Zhongyou of the same league.

On 31 January 2017, Milijaš rejoined his club Red Star Belgrade for a third time, this time on a half-year contract. An avid Red Star fan, he once again proved loyalty to his club and fans. The same year in April, Milijaš played his 200th match for Red Star Belgrade in a 2–1 league victory against Spartak Subotica.

On 19 May 2019, Milijaš played his last match for Red Star in a 3–0 victory against Napredak. For nine years in Red Star, he played 170 matches, scored 49 goals and had 38 assists. Milijaš also won four trophies, with all four being Serbian SuperLiga in 2006–07, 2013–14, 2017–18, and 2018–19 seasons.

== International career ==
Milijaš represented Serbia and Montenegro at under-21 level, being part of the team which made the semi-finals of the 2006 UEFA European Under-21 Championship in Portugal.

On 6 September 2008, Milijaš made his full international debut for Serbia in a 2–0 victory against the Faroe Islands in a World Cup 2010 qualifier. He scored his first international goal in his fourth appearance, a 6–1 friendly victory against Bulgaria on 19 November 2008. Milijaš added his first competitive goal when he netted the winning goal from the penalty spot to defeat Austria 1–0 on 6 June 2009. This qualification campaign led Serbia to qualify for the 2010 FIFA World Cup finals in South Africa as an independent nation, with Milijaš being a regular central midfielder and usually paired with captain Dejan Stanković.

In June 2010, Milijaš was selected in Serbia's squad for the 2010 FIFA World Cup, where he appeared in group stage match against Ghana. He earned a total of 25 caps, scoring four goals. and his final international was an October 2011 European Championship qualification match away against Slovenia.

== Managerial career ==
Milijaš was appointed assistant coach of Red Star Belgrade in 2019.

== Personal life ==
In 2010, Milijaš married his long-time girlfriend, volleyball player Ksenija Cicvarić.

== Career statistics ==
=== Club ===
Appearances and goals by club, season and competition
Club	Season	League			National cup		League cup		Continental		Total	
Club	Season	Division	Apps	Goals	Apps	Goals	Apps	Goals	Apps	Goals	Apps	Goals
Zemun	1999–00	First League of Serbia and Montenegro	2	0			—		—		2	0
Zemun	2000–01	First League of Serbia and Montenegro	10	0			—		—		10	0
Zemun	2001–02	First League of Serbia and Montenegro	26	1			—		—		26	1
Zemun	2002–03	First League of Serbia and Montenegro	27	2			—		—		27	2
Zemun	2003–04	First League of Serbia and Montenegro	27	3			—		—		27	3
Zemun	2004–05	First League of Serbia and Montenegro	22	3			—		—		22	3
Zemun	2005–06	First League of Serbia and Montenegro	15	8			—		—		15	8
Zemun	Total		129	17			—		—		129	17
Red Star Belgrade	2005–06	First League of Serbia and Montenegro	10	4	2	0	—		0	0	12	4
Red Star Belgrade	2006–07	Serbian SuperLiga	25	5	5	1	—		4	0	34	6
Red Star Belgrade	2007–08	Serbian SuperLiga	29	10	3	1	—		10	1	42	12
Red Star Belgrade	2008–09	Serbian SuperLiga	33	18	4	3	—		2	2	39	23
Red Star Belgrade	Total		97	37	14	5	—		16	3	127	45
Wolverhampton	2009–10	Premier League	19	2	2	0	1	0	0	0	22	2
Wolverhampton	2010–11	Premier League	23	2	2	1	2	2	0	0	27	5
Wolverhampton	2011–12	Premier League	20	0	1	0	3	2	0	0	24	2
Wolverhampton	Total		62	4	5	1	6	4	0	0	73	9
Red Star Belgrade	2012–13	Serbian SuperLiga	26	9	3	0	—		0	0	29	9
Red Star Belgrade	2013–14	Serbian SuperLiga	29	8	3	1	—		4	0	36	9
Red Star Belgrade	2014–15	Serbian SuperLiga	3	3	0	0	—		0	0	3	3
Red Star Belgrade	Total		58	20	6	1	—		4	0	68	21
Manisaspor	2014–15	TFF 1. Lig	18	7	5	1	—		0	0	23	8
Hebei China Fortune	2015	China League One	29	13	0	0	—		—		29	13
Nei Mongol Zhongyou	2016	China League One	27	3	0	0	—		—		27	3
Red Star Belgrade	2016–17	Serbian SuperLiga	9	0	1	0	—		0	0	10	0
Red Star Belgrade	2017–18	Serbian SuperLiga	30	0	3	1	—		4	1	37	2
Red Star Belgrade	2018–19	Serbian SuperLiga	7	0	1	0	—		0	0	8	0
Red Star Belgrade	Total		46	0	5	1	—		4	1	55	2
Career total			466	101	35	9	6	4	24	4	531	118

=== International ===
Serbia national team
Year	Apps	Goals
2008	5	1
2009	9	2
2010	6	1
2011	5	0
Total	25	4

==== International goals ====
Scores and results list Serbia's goal tally first.

#	Date	Venue	Opponent	Score	Result	Competition
1	19 November 2008	Partizan Stadium, Belgrade, Serbia	Bulgaria	5–1	6–1	Friendly
2	6 June 2009	Red Star Stadium, Belgrade, Serbia	Austria	1–0	1–0	2010 World Cup qualifier
3	9 September 2009	Red Star Stadium, Belgrade, Serbia	France	1–0	1–1	2010 World Cup qualifier
4	4 June 2010	Partizan Stadium, Belgrade, Serbia	Cameroon	3–2	4–3	Friendly

== Managerial statistics ==
As of 15 November 2026

Managerial record by team and tenure
Team	From	To	Record					Ref.
Team	From	To	P	W	D	L	Win %	Ref.
Red Star Belgrade (youth)	24 July 2023	9 June 2026	159	125	22	12	78.62	
TSC	10 June 2026	Present	18	11	6	1	61.11	
Total			177	136	28	13	76.84	—

== Honours ==
Red Star Belgrade

- Serbian SuperLiga: 2005–06, 2006–07, 2013–14, 2017–18, 2018–19
- Serbian Cup: 2005–06, 2006–07

Individual

- Serbian SuperLiga Player of the Season: 2008–09
- Serbian SuperLiga Team of the Season: 2008–09
