= Zoran Banović =

Montenegrin footballer

Personal information
- Full name: Zoran Banović
- Date of birth: 14 October 1977 (age 49)
- Place of birth: Nikšić, SFR Yugoslavia
- Height: 1.86 m (6 ft 1 in)
- Position: Goalkeeper

Senior career*
Years	Team	Apps	(Gls)
1998–2004	Sutjeska Nikšić	80	(0)
2004–2008	Red Star Belgrade	17	(0)
2008–2009	Spartak Varna	7	(0)
2009–2010	Otrant Ulcinj	5	(0)
2010	Mornar Bar	17	(0)
2011	Budućnost Podgorica	6	(0)
2011–2013	Čelik Nikšić	59	(0)
Total		191	(0)

International career^{‡}
2004	Serbia and Montenegro	1	(0)
- * Club domestic league appearances and goals as of 22 July 2013 ‡ National team caps and goals as of 5 July 2012

Zoran Banović (Serbian Cyrillic: Зоран Бановић; born 14 October 1977) is a Montenegrin retired football goalkeeper.

== Club career ==
Banović started to play football in his home town Nikšić in local club FK Sutjeska. Between 2004 and 2008 he was part of the notable Serbian club Crvena zvezda. For four years in Zvezda Banović earned 17 appearances in the Serbian SuperLiga.

In February 2009 Banović was invited by Bulgarian side Spartak Varna to join the club for a trial period, which began on 17 February. He made his team debut a few days later, in a 1-0 friendly win against PFC Svetkavitsa. On 22 February Spartak signed Banović to a one-a-half-year deal.

In 2009, he returned to Montenegro where has represented FK Otrant, FK Mornar, FK Budućnost Podgorica and FK Čelik Nikšić.

== International career ==
In 2004 Banović played 90 minutes for Serbia and Montenegro national team in a friendly match against Northern Ireland.

In 2007, he was expected to be called up for Montenegro's inaugural match against Hungary but he never got the call from head coach Zoran Filipović, mainly due to his rare occasions to prove himself at Red Star Belgrade at that time.

Serbia and Montenegro
Year	Apps	Goals
2004	1	0
Total	1	0

== Honours ==
Red Star

- First League of Serbia and Montenegro: 2005–06
- Serbian SuperLiga: 2006–07
- Serbian Cup: 2006–07

Čelik Nikšić

- Montenegrin Cup: 2011–12
- Montenegrin Second League: 2011–12
