= Ivan Ranđelović =

Serbian footballer

Personal information
- Full name: Ivan Ranđelović
- Date of birth: 24 December 1974 (age 51)
- Place of birth: Niš, SFR Yugoslavia
- Height: 1.96 m (6 ft 5 in)
- Position: Goalkeeper

Senior career*
Years	Team	Apps	(Gls)
1992–1996	Radnički Niš	103	(0)
1996–1998	Las Palmas	0	(0)
1998–1999	Zvezdara		
1999–2001	Milicionar	39	(0)
2001–2008	Red Star Belgrade	126	(0)
Total		268	(0)
- * Club domestic league appearances and goals

Ivan Ranđelović (Serbian Cyrillic: Иван Ранђеловић; born 24 December 1974) is a Serbian former professional footballer who played as a goalkeeper.

== Career ==
Ranđelović started out at his hometown side Radnički Niš, making his first-team debut in the 1992–93 season. He was the club's first-choice goalkeeper until 1996, before transferring to Spanish club Las Palmas. Over the following two years, Ranđelović managed to make only one Copa del Rey appearance, before returning to his homeland. He subsequently played for two Belgrade-based clubs, Zvezdara and Milicionar.

In June 2001, Ranđelović signed with Red Star Belgrade. He spent the following seven seasons with the club, winning three domestic league titles (2004, 2006, and 2007) and four national cups (2002, 2004, 2006, and 2007).

== Honours ==
Red Star Belgrade

- Serbian SuperLiga: 2003–04, 2005–06, 2006–07
- Serbian Cup: 2001–02, 2003–04, 2005–06, 2006–07
