= 2006–07 Serbian SuperLiga =

1st season of Serbian SuperLiga

Meridian SuperLiga
- Season: 2006–07
- Champions: Red Star; 1st SuperLiga title 26th domestic title
- Relegated: Zemun; Voždovac
- Champions League: Red Star (second qualifying round)
- UEFA Cup: Partizan; Vojvodina; Bežanija
- Matches: 198
- Goals: 452 (2.28 per match)

The 2006–07 Serbian SuperLiga (known as the Meridian SuperLiga for sponsorship reasons) season started on 5 August 2006. The winners were Red Star Belgrade with their 25th title. FK Zemun and FK Voždovac were relegated to the 2nd league of Serbia at the conclusion of the season. The SuperLiga were to change format from the following season with the league no longer being divided into title and relegation groups midway through the campaign. Instead the 12 teams were to play each other three times in a conventional league format.

== Teams ==
Location of teams in the 2006–07 Serbian SuperLiga

Club	City	Stadium	Capacity
Red Star	Belgrade	Red Star Stadium	55,538
Partizan	Belgrade	Partizan Stadium	32,710
Vojvodina	Novi Sad	Karađorđe Stadium	17,204
Banat	Zrenjanin	Stadion Karađorđev park	18,700
Smederevo	Smederevo	Smederevo City Stadium	17,200
OFK Beograd	Karaburma, Belgrade	Omladinski Stadium	20,000
Voždovac	Voždovac, Belgrade	Voždovac Stadium	6,000
Hajduk Kula	Kula	Stadion Hajduk	6,000
Bežanija	Belgrade	Stadion FK Bežanija	9,350
Mladost	Apatin	SC Rade Svilar	6,000
Borac	Čačak	Čačak Stadium	6,000
Zemun	Zemun, Belgrade	Zemun Stadium	10,000

== Regular season ==
=== League table ===
Pos	Team	Pld	W	D	L	GF	GA	GD	Pts	Qualification
1	Red Star Belgrade	22	16	3	3	37	16	+21	51	Qualification for championship round
2	Partizan	22	13	3	6	32	20	+12	42	Qualification for championship round
3	Vojvodina	22	11	4	7	23	16	+7	37	Qualification for championship round
4	Mladost Apatin	22	9	8	5	19	13	+6	35	Qualification for championship round
5	Hajduk Kula	22	11	2	9	21	21	0	35	Qualification for championship round
6	Bežanija	22	7	12	3	24	17	+7	33	Qualification for championship round
7	OFK Beograd	22	8	8	6	28	16	+12	32	Qualification for relegation round
8	Banat Zrenjanin	22	8	5	9	20	27	−7	29	Qualification for relegation round
9	Smederevo	22	6	7	9	17	21	−4	25	Qualification for relegation round
10	Borac Čačak	22	5	7	10	10	17	−7	22	Qualification for relegation round
11	Voždovac	22	4	6	12	16	31	−15	18	Qualification for relegation round
12	Zemun	22	0	3	19	8	40	−32	3	Qualification for relegation round

Source: RSSSF.org
Rules for classification: 1) points; 2) goal difference; 3) number of goals scored.

=== Results ===
Home \ Away	BAN	BEŽ	BOR	HAJ	MLA	OFK	PAR	RSB	SME	VOJ	VOŽ	ZEM
Banat Zrenjanin		0–2	0–1	1–0	0–0	1–0	1–2	1–4	0–0	0–0	2–0	2–1
Bežanija	2–2		0–0	1–0	2–0	0–0	3–4	1–1	0–0	0–0	1–1	2–0
Borac Čačak	0–1	1–1		0–3	0–0	0–0	0–1	0–2	0–0	2–1	0–1	1–0
Hajduk Kula	2–1	1–1	1–0		0–2	2–0	0–1	0–2	1–0	1–0	2–0	1–0
Mladost Apatin	1–1	1–1	1–0	1–0		0–0	1–0	0–1	3–0	2–0	1–0	2–0
OFK Beograd	3–0	1–1	0–0	5–1	2–0		1–1	0–1	0–0	0–1	6–2	3–0
Partizan	2–0	1–3	2–0	0–1	1–0	0–1		0–0	2–1	0–1	2–0	2–0
Red Star Belgrade	2–0	1–1	2–1	3–1	2–0	1–0	2–4		1–0	0–3	2–0	5–0
Smederevo	0–1	2–0	1–0	1–1	1–2	2–1	2–2	1–2		0–0	3–1	2–0
Vojvodina	4–2	1–0	0–2	1–0	1–1	1–2	1–0	0–1	1–0		1–0	2–1
Voždovac	1–3	0–1	0–0	1–2	0–0	1–1	1–3	2–0	3–0	1–0		1–1
Zemun	0–1	0–1	0–2	0–1	1–1	1–2	1–2	1–2	0–1	1–4	0–0	

Source: RSSSF.org
Legend: Blue = home team win; Yellow = draw; Red = away team win.

== Play-offs ==
=== Championship round ===
==== League table ====
Pos	Team	Pld	W	D	L	GF	GA	GD	Pts	Qualification
1	Red Star Belgrade (C)	32	23	5	4	55	27	+28	74	Qualification for Champions League second qualifying round
2	Partizan	32	18	3	11	47	31	+16	57	Qualification for UEFA Cup first qualifying round
3	Vojvodina	32	16	6	10	38	25	+13	54	Qualification for UEFA Cup first qualifying round
4	Bežanija	32	12	12	8	36	31	+5	48	Qualification for UEFA Cup first qualifying round
5	Hajduk Kula	32	14	4	14	29	30	−1	46	Qualification for Intertoto Cup second round
6	Mladost Apatin	32	11	8	13	25	33	−8	41	

Source: RSSSF.org
Rules for classification: 1) points; 2) goal difference; 3) number of goals scored.
(C) Champions

==== Results ====
Home \ Away	BEŽ	HAJ	MLA	PAR	RSB	VOJ
Bežanija		1–0	1–0	2–1	2–4	3–2
Hajduk Kula	1–0		2–1	3–0	1–2	0–0
Mladost Apatin	1–0	1–0		0–2	0–1	0–1
Partizan	1–0	2–0	7–1		1–2	1–0
Red Star Belgrade	1–3	1–1	2–1	1–0		4–2
Vojvodina	3–0	1–0	4–1	2–0	0–0	

Source: RSSSF.org
Legend: Blue = home team win; Yellow = draw; Red = away team win.

=== Relegation round ===
==== League table ====
Pos	Team	Pld	W	D	L	GF	GA	GD	Pts	Qualification or relegation
7	OFK Beograd	32	14	8	10	49	29	+20	50	
8	Smederevo	32	12	7	13	33	40	−7	43	
9	Banat Zrenjanin	32	12	6	14	36	44	−8	42	
10	Borac Čačak (O)	32	10	8	14	26	30	−4	38	Qualification for relegation play-off
11	Voždovac (R)	32	10	7	15	33	45	−12	37	Relegation to Serbian First League
12	Zemun (R)	32	1	4	27	22	64	−42	7	Relegation to Serbian First League

Source: RSSSF.org
Rules for classification: 1) points; 2) goal difference; 3) number of goals scored.
(O) Play-off winners; (R) Relegated

==== Results ====
Home \ Away	BAN	BOR	OFK	SME	VOŽ	ZEM
Banat Zrenjanin		2–2	1–2	1–0	0–1	3–2
Borac Čačak	3–0		3–1	2–0	1–0	3–1
OFK Beograd	2–1	4–1		4–0	2–3	2–0
Smederevo	3–1	1–0	3–2		2–1	4–2
Voždovac	1–4	1–0	1–0	4–1		3–2
Zemun	1–2	3–1	0–2	1–2	2–2	

Source: RSSSF.org
Legend: Blue = home team win; Yellow = draw; Red = away team win.

== Winning squad ==
Champions: RED STAR BELGRADE (coach: Dušan Bajević, Boško Đurovski) players (league matches/league goals):
(Serbia) Dušan Đokić (28/14)
(Serbia) Nenad Milijaš (25/5)
(Serbia) Dušan Anđelković (24/1)
(Senegal) Ibrahima Gueye (24/0)
(Ecuador) Segundo Castillo (23/8) signed from El Nacional on 31 August 2006 – the last day of summer 2006 transfer window
(Serbia) Dejan Milovanović (23/3)
(Serbia) Ivan Ranđelović (23/0) -goalkeeper-
(Montenegro) Milan Purović (22/6)
(Serbia) Aleksandar Pantić (21/0)
(Serbia) Aleksandar Trišović (21/0)
(Bulgaria) Blagoy Georgiev (20/2)
(Serbia) Marko Perović (18/0)
(Serbia) Nikola Trajković (17/0)
(Serbia) Dušan Basta (16/0)
(Serbia) Đorđe Tutorić (15/0)
(Serbia) Milan Biševac (14/2)
(Montenegro) Igor Burzanović (13/3)
(Serbia) Milanko Rašković (13/3)
(Serbia) Ognjen Koroman (12/2) arrived on loan in early February 2007 during 2006/07 winter transfer window
(Brazil) Aílton (11/3) signed on 31 August 2006 – the last day of summer 2006 transfer window
(Brazil) Ely Tadeu (10/0)
(Serbia) Miloš Bajalica (9/0)
(Serbia) Nebojša Joksimović (9/0)
(Montenegro) Zoran Banović (7/0) -goalkeeper-
(Serbia) Vladimir Đorđević (5/0)
(Serbia) Nikola Žigić (3/2) sold to Racing de Santander on 29 August 2006 during 2006 summer transfer window
(Serbia) Nenad Kovačević (3/0) sold to RC Lens in August 2006 during 2006 summer transfer window
(Serbia) Radovan Krivokapić (3/0)
(Serbia) Bojan Miladinović (3/0)
(Serbia) Saša Radivojević (3/0)
(Serbia) Boško Janković (2/0) sold to Real Mallorca in August 2006 during 2006 summer transfer window
(Serbia) Nenad Srećković (2/0)
(Serbia) Miloš Reljić (1/1)
(Serbia) Goran Adamović (1/0)
(Serbia) Marko Nikolić (1/0)
(Serbia) Slavko Perović (1/0)

== Relegation playoff ==
Third placed team from Serbian First League meets the 3rd from the bottom placed team from Serbian SuperLiga in a home-and-away tie. The aggregate winner gets a spot in 2007–08 SuperLiga.

- Napredak – Borac 0–0
- Borac – Napredak 1–0

1:0 Irfan Vušljanin (42')

== Top scorers ==
Rank	Player	Team	Goals
1	(Serbia) Srđan Baljak	Banat Zrenjanin	18
2	(Serbia) Ranko Despotović	Vojvodina	17
3	(Serbia) Dušan Đokić	Red Star Belgrade	14
4	(Serbia) Đorđe Rakić	OFK Beograd	13
5	(Serbia) Nikola Đurđić	Voždovac	10
5	(Serbia) Nebojša Marinković	Partizan	10
5	(Nigeria) Obiora Odita	Partizan	10

== Promoted teams ==
The following teams were promoted to the Meridian SuperLiga at the end of the 2006–07 season:

- Mladost Lučani – Serbian First League champions
- Čukarički Stankom – Serbian First League runners-up
- Napredak Kruševac – will play in the Serbian SuperLiga for 2007/08 season despite losing the relegation playoff to Borac Čačak because Mladost Apatin withdrew from competition in 2007–08 SuperLiga due to being unable to bear the financial burden of playing in a top division.

== Relegated teams ==
The following teams were relegated to the Serbian First League at the end of the 2006–07 season:

- Zemun – Automatically relegated after finishing in 12th position with only 7 points from 32 games.
- Voždovac – Automatically relegated after finishing in 11th position.
- Mladost Apatin – Withdrew due to financial reasons.
