= Dejan Milovanović =

Serbian footballer (1984–2025)

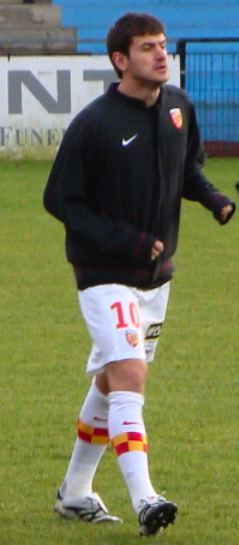
- Milovanović with Lens in 2009

Personal information
- Full name: Dejan Milovanović
- Date of birth: 21 January 1984
- Place of birth: Belgrade, SR Serbia, Yugoslavia
- Date of death: 16 September 2025 (aged 41)
- Place of death: Belgrade, Serbia
- Height: 1.80 m (5 ft 11 in)
- Position: Midfielder

Youth career
- Red Star Belgrade

Senior career*
Years	Team	Apps	(Gls)
2001–2008	Red Star Belgrade	155	(17)
2008–2011	Lens	40	(2)
2010–2011	→ Red Star Belgrade (loan)	18	(3)
2011–2013	Panionios	16	(0)
2013–2014	Voždovac	23	(0)
Total		252	(22)

International career
2003–2007	Serbia U21	23	(6)
2008	Serbia	2	(0)
Medal record
Silver medal – second place	UEFA Under-21 Championship	2004
Silver medal – second place	UEFA Under-21 Championship	2007
- * Club domestic league appearances and goals

Dejan Milovanović (Serbian Cyrillic: Дејан Миловановић; 21 January 1984 – 16 September 2025) was a Serbian professional footballer who played as a midfielder.

== Club career ==
=== Red Star Belgrade ===
Milovanović was a member of the talented 1984 generation, and was the first to become a first team player from that group. He made his debut for Red Star Belgrade on 17 November 2001 when he was 17. In that match Zvezda won against FK Zemun, the score finishing 2–0. He gathered the attention of the public on his debut, in a derby game against Partizan in which he worked his way past three players in fantastic style, scoring a goal that wrapped up the 3–0 victory.

Milovanović played for the Red Star Belgrade first team from 2001, becoming the captain of the club in 2006. He was also team captain of the Serbian under-21 team who finished second at the 2007 UEFA European Under-21 Championship in the Netherlands. Milovanović played over 200 games for Red Star Belgrade and won three doubles.

=== Lens ===
On 4 July 2008, Milovanović officially signed a four-year contract with Lens for an undisclosed fee. Milovanović has been announced as one of the main new signings in the club's effort to return to the top French league. In the summer of 2010, Lens allowed Milovanović to return to his former club, Red Star, on a season-long loan with an option for a permanent deal.

=== Voždovac ===
Milovanović signed with newly promoted Serbian side FK Voždovac in August 2013.

== International career ==
Milovanović was capped twice for Serbia in 2008. With Serbia U21 he played in three UEFA European Under-21 Championships, in 2004, 2006 and 2007. He has won two silver medals in these competitions. He was also part of the Serbia and Montenegro squad at the 2004 Summer Olympics in Athens.

He especially made a good impression in the 2007 UEFA European Under-21 Championship in the Netherlands, carrying the captain's armband, on the way to the finals; in the first match he scored a winning goal against Italy.

== Personal life ==
Dejan Milovanović was the son of Đorđe Milovanović, a member of Red Star Belgrade in the late 1970s and early to mid 1980s. Dejan was also the cousin of former Serbian international Branislav Ivanović.

== Death ==
Milovanović died from a heart attack on 16 September 2025, at the age of 41, after collapsing on the pitch during his veteran team football match in Belgrade.

== Career statistics ==
Appearances and goals by club, season and competition
Club	Season	League			National cup (Note: Includes Serbian Cup, Coupe de France, Greek Cup.)		Continental		Total	
Club	Season	Division	Apps	Goals	Apps	Goals	Apps	Goals	Apps	Goals
Red Star Belgrade	2001–02	Serbian SuperLiga	18	2	3	0	0	0	21	2
Red Star Belgrade	2002–03	Serbian SuperLiga	26	1	5	0	4	1	35	2
Red Star Belgrade	2003–04	Serbian SuperLiga	21	0	3	0	2	0	26	0
Red Star Belgrade	2004–05	Serbian SuperLiga	18	0	3	0	4	0	25	0
Red Star Belgrade	2005–06	Serbian SuperLiga	23	2	5	2	4	0	32	4
Red Star Belgrade	2006–07	Serbian SuperLiga	23	3	5	1	6	1	34	5
Red Star Belgrade	2007–08	Serbian SuperLiga	26	9	3	2	5	0	34	11
Red Star Belgrade	Total		155	17	27	5	25	2	207	24
Lens	2008–09	Ligue 2	24	2	0	0	0	0	24	2
Lens	2009–10	Ligue 1	16	0	2	0	0	0	18	0
Lens	Total		40	2	2	0	0	0	42	2
Red Star Belgrade (loan)	2010–11	Serbian SuperLiga	18	3	3	1	2	0	23	4
Panionios	2011–12	Super League Greece	14	0	0	0	0	0	14	0
Panionios	2012–13	Super League Greece	2	0	0	0	0	0	2	0
Panionios	Total		16	0	0	0	0	0	16	0
Voždovac	2013–14	Serbian SuperLiga	23	0	2	0	0	0	25	0
Career total			252	22	34	6	27	2	313	30

== Honours ==
Red Star Belgrade

- First League of Serbia and Montenegro: 2003–04, 2005–06
- Serbian SuperLiga: 2006–07
- Serbia and Montenegro Cup: 2001–02, 2003–04, 2005–06
- Serbian Cup: 2006–07

Lens

- Ligue 2: 2008–09
