= Saša Radivojević =

Serbian footballer

Personal information
- Full name: Saša Radivojević
- Date of birth: 10 April 1979 (age 47)
- Place of birth: Belgrade, SFR Yugoslavia
- Height: 1.95 m (6 ft 5 in)
- Position: Goalkeeper

Youth career
- Radnički Beograd
- Partizan

Senior career*
Years	Team	Apps	(Gls)
1996–2002	Radnički Beograd		
2002–2004	Zeta	52	(0)
2004–2005	Pegah Gilan	28	(0)
2005–2006	Apollon Kalamarias	3	(0)
2006–2010	Red Star Belgrade	21	(0)
2008	→ Borac Čačak (loan)	15	(0)
2010	→ Čukarički (loan)	15	(0)
2010	Čukarički	7	(0)
2011–2012	Pelita Jaya		

International career
	FR Yugoslavia U21	3	(0)
- * Club domestic league appearances and goals

Saša Radivojević (Serbian Cyrillic: Саша Радивојевић; born 10 April 1979) is a Serbian retired footballer who played as a goalkeeper.

== Career ==
Before moving to Red Star he played for FK Radnički Beograd, FK Zeta, Pegah Gilan, Apollon Kalamarias, FK Borac Čačak and FK Čukarički.

Radivojević was signed by Red Star in order to secure the goalkeeper position at the club after Vladimir Stojković's departure to Nantes. With Red Star he won national championship (2007) and Serbian Cup (2007).

For the second part of the 2007–08 season, he was loaned to FK Borac Čačak and also the second part of the 2009–10 season, he was loaned to FK Čukarički.
