= Milanko Rašković =

Serbian footballer

Personal information
- Full name: Milanko Rašković
- Date of birth: 13 March 1981 (age 45)
- Place of birth: Raška, SFR Yugoslavia
- Height: 1.85 m (6 ft 1 in)
- Position: Striker

Senior career*
Years	Team	Apps	(Gls)
2001–2002	Bane	25	(10)
2002–2005	Zeta	82	(18)
2005–2008	Red Star Belgrade	39	(9)
2008–2010	Pandurii Târgu Jiu	45	(4)
2010	Čukarički	11	(1)
2011	Shakhter Karagandy	16	(2)
2012–2013	Borac Čačak	45	(20)
2014–2015	Zemun	35	(11)
2016	Kolubara	13	(4)
2016–2017	Victoria Wanderers		
2018	Kolubara		
2018	Mladost Kupinovo		
2018	Sremčica		

International career
2002	FR Yugoslavia U21 (Note: Only official UEFA matches included)	1	(0)
- * Club domestic league appearances and goals as of 13 July 2017

Milanko Rašković (Serbian Cyrillic: Миланко Рашковић; born 13 March 1981) is a Serbian retired footballer who played as a striker.

== Honours ==
=== Club ===
Red Star Belgrade

- Serbian SuperLiga: 2005–06, 2006–07
- Serbian Cup: 2005–06, 2006–07

Zemun

- Serbian League Belgrade: 2014–15

=== Individual ===
- Serbian First League Top Scorer: 2012–13
