= Nikola Žigić =

Serbian footballer (born 1980)

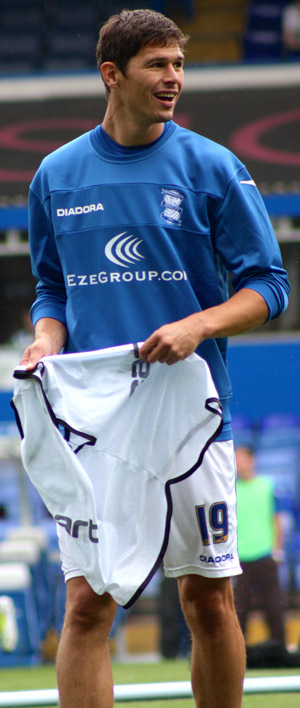
- With Birmingham City in 2012 pre-season

Personal information
- Full name: Nikola Žigić
- Date of birth: 25 September 1980 (age 46)
- Place of birth: Bačka Topola, SR Serbia, SFR Yugoslavia
- Height: 2.02 m (6 ft 8 in)
- Position: Centre forward

Youth career
- 1991–1998: AIK Bačka Topola

Senior career*
Years	Team	Apps	(Gls)
1998–2001	AIK Bačka Topola	76	(68)
2001–2002	Mornar	23	(15)
2002	Kolubara	8	(3)
2003–2006	Red Star Belgrade	79	(47)
2003	→ Spartak Subotica (loan)	11	(14)
2006–2007	Racing Santander	32	(11)
2007–2010	Valencia	28	(5)
2009	→ Racing Santander (loan)	19	(13)
2010–2014	Birmingham City (Note: Birmingham's goal in the 2–1 defeat to Bolton Wanderers on 5 October, originally credited to Žigić, was retrospectively awarded to Lee Novak.)	128	(32)
2014–2015	Birmingham City	9	(0)
Total		413	(208)

International career
2004–2011	Serbia and Montenegro/Serbia	57	(20)
- * Club domestic league appearances and goals

Nikola Žigić (Serbian Cyrillic: Никола Жигић, IPA: [nǐkola ʒǐːɡitɕ]; born 25 September 1980) is a Serbian former professional footballer who played as a centre forward.

Žigić was born in Bačka Topola, in what was then SFR Yugoslavia. He began playing football as a youngster with AIK Bačka Topola, and scored 68 goals from 76 first-team matches over a three-year period in the third tier of Yugoslav football. Military service took him to Bar in 2001, where he was able to continue his goalscoring career with the local second-level club Mornar. A brief spell back in the third tier with Kolubara preceded his turning professional with First League side Red Star Belgrade in January 2003. He spent time on loan at third-tier Spartak Subotica before making his Red Star debut later that year. Despite suggestions that his height, of 2.02 m (6 ft 7 1/2 in), made him better suited to sports other than football, Žigić ended the season as First League top scorer, domestic player of the year, league champion and scorer of the winning goal in the cup final. He won a second league–cup double in 2005–06, a second player of the year award, and finished his three-year Red Star career with 70 goals from 109 appearances in all competitions.

In August 2006, Žigić signed for Spanish club Racing Santander; his goals and his partnership with Pedro Munitis helped them achieve a mid-table finish in La Liga. He then moved to Valencia, but was unable to establish himself as a regular in the starting eleven. He spent the second half of the 2008–09 La Liga season back with Racing on loan, for whom he scored 13 goals in just 19 matches. Žigić joined Birmingham City of the Premier League in 2010, and in his first season, he scored in their League Cup win. Even after relegation to the Championship, and despite increasing efforts to remove his large salary from the financially struggling club's wage bill, he remained with Birmingham for the full four years of his contract. Having been without a club for a few months, he rejoined Birmingham for the second half of the 2014–15 season.

Žigić made his senior international debut for Serbia and Montenegro in March 2004, and following the breakup of Serbia and Montenegro in 2006, he played internationally for Serbia until 2011. He won 57 caps for his country and scored 20 goals. He was a member of the 2006 and 2010 World Cup squads, and briefly captained his country in 2011.

== Personal life ==
Žigić was born in Bačka Topola, in what was then SFR Yugoslavia, the son of Jovan, a former footballer, and his wife Milica, who had been a basketball player. He completed his secondary education at the mechanical engineering school in Bačka Topola. His brother Branko, 15 months his junior, also became a footballer, as a central defender with clubs including Cement Beočin and Serbian First League club Proleter Novi Sad. During the Yugoslav Wars in 1999, Žigić's hometown was beneath the flight-path of NATO bombers heading for Belgrade; for much of that part of the conflict, the family home was without electricity or running water.

Žigić is married to Sanja; the couple have two daughters and a son. As of 2018, they were living near Valencia, Spain, and Žigić was assisting in his agent's business.

== Club career ==
=== Early career ===
He joined his hometown football club, AIK Bačka Topola, as a youngster, and graduated to the senior side in 1998–99. He began as a centre back, but soon realised he preferred scoring goals to defending. Žigić's parents did not want him to take football seriously until he completed his education, and he remained with AIK Bačka Topola until 2001, scoring 68 goals in 76 matches in the Serbian League Vojvodina, the third level of Yugoslav football. When military service took him to Bar, he was able to play for the local club, Mornar, for whom he scored 15 goals from 23 appearances in the 2001–02 Second League of FR Yugoslavia. After trials in France with Saint-Étienne and Créteil came to nothing, Žigić returned home where he played 8 matches for third-tier club Kolubara, scoring 3 goals.

Žigić signed his first professional contract in January 2003, with Red Star Belgrade, the biggest club in the country. Because he was not considered ready for first-team football at that level, he spent the latter part of the 2002–03 season on loan at Spartak Subotica, another third-tier side, for whom his goalscoring rate was even higher: 14 goals from just 11 league games.

=== Red Star ===
Returning head coach Slavoljub Muslin brought Žigić into Red Star's senior squad for the 2003–04 First League season, and gave him his debut in the starting eleven on the opening day. That first game ended in defeat, and Žigić's physical appearance – a growth spurt from the age of 16 had brought his height to 2.02 m (6 ft 7 1/2 in) – provoked suggestions that he might be better suited to basketball. He opened the scoring as they beat Hajduk Kula 2–0 in the next league match. In between, he produced a hat-trick against Nistru in the 2003–04 UEFA Cup qualifying round, and went on to contribute a further three goals as Red Star beat Odense 6–5 on aggregate in the first round. He scored twice in the 3–0 win in the Eternal Derby against Partizan, and celebrated by miming a basketball shot. By the mid-season break, he had 12 league goals as well as the 6 in the UEFA Cup, and was named Player of the Year for 2003, both by the captains of the First League teams voting via the Večernje novosti newspaper and by the Football Association. He finished the season as the league's top scorer, with 18, as Red Star won their 23rd title, and scored the winning goal in the cup final.

Resuming the partnership with Marko Pantelić begun in the second half of 2003–04, Žigić continued to score freely in the new season. With Red Star two goals and a man down in the first leg of the Champions League qualifier against Young Boys, he netted twice in the last 12 minutes to give his team an away draw. Domestically, Pantelić top-scored with 21 league goals and Žigić contributed 15 as Red Star finished in second place, behind Partizan. Žigić scored against Partizan to help Red Star reach the cup final, but was one of five regular starters unavailable for that match through injury or suspension, and his team lost to a last-minute goal to ten-man Železnik.

In September 2005, Žigić signed a one-year extension to his contract, which had been due to expire at the end of the season. He helped his team progress through the qualifying rounds of the UEFA Cup, and according to Reuters' correspondent, "capped a brilliant individual performance with two goals" as well as providing the cross for Milan Purović as Red Star beat Roma 3–1 in the third match of the group stage. His first goal, a header, appeared to have been scored from an offside position, but for the second, in the 86th minute, he dispossessed Philippe Mexès, evaded two more opponents, and bent the ball into the top corner from 25 m (27 yd) with his weaker left foot. He said afterwards, "I've never scored a goal like that in my entire career. I was going to pass the ball but there was no one ahead of me so I just decided to go for it and see what happens". The win left Red Star needing to win their last group match to stand a chance of qualifying for the knockout rounds, but they failed to do so.

For the second time in three years, Žigić was chosen as domestic player of the year in the captains' poll, and was also honoured by the Red Star Sport Association as best male athlete of 2005, an award open to athletes representing the club in any sport, not just in football. After Pantelić's departure for Hertha BSC, Red Star's goals were spread more evenly among the remaining forward players. In the league, Žigić and Boško Janković were joint-top scorers with 12, and Purović contributed one fewer, as the club won their 24th title. They completed the double with a defeat of city rivals OFK in the cup final, coming back from 2–0 down via Žigić's 67th-minute free kick under the defensive wall and Purović's equaliser to take the match into extra time, during which Žigić gave Red Star the lead with a header and Dušan Basta made the final score 4–2. After the match, Žigić refused to answer questions about his Red Star future.

=== Racing Santander ===
Žigić began the season with Red Star, but on 29 August 2006, he signed a four-year contract with La Liga club Racing Santander. The fee, officially undisclosed, was variously reported at anything from €4.5M to €7M. Although better offers had been rejected, those offers had arrived at the wrong time: the pressure on Red Star to win the domestic title meant they were unlikely to dispose of a major player in mid-season. The player felt he was more likely to start matches with a club at Racing's level. Partnering the diminutive Pedro Munitis, he contributed 11 goals – including a hat-trick in a 5–4 win over Athletic Bilbao – four assists and five penalties won in league competition over the season as Racing finished tenth. The efficacy of the pair earned them the nickname of Dúo Sacapuntos (the Two Point-getters (Note: The nickname is a play on the name of Spanish comedy act the Dúo Sacapuntas, which comprises one tall and one short partner.)); ahead of the coming season, new coach Marcelino García Toral recalled how "we all know how many points Racing picked up when Žigić and Munitis weren't there. Without them, Racing didn't add points". His performances earned him the captains' vote as best player based abroad for 2006, and contributed to his 2007 Football Association of Serbia Golden Ball award.

=== Valencia ===
Žigić signed for Valencia in August 2007. The fee was unconfirmed, but suggestions appeared in the media of €15M, €18M, and around €20M, a figure possibly including the player's wages over the five years of his contract. He had been linked with numerous other moves, and Fenerbahçe made an offer that was better financially for both Racing and the player, but Žigić preferred to stay in "the best league in Europe" in a country where he was accustomed to the language and culture. He was suffering from an ankle injury when he arrived – which delayed his integration into the first-team group and, according to Mundo Deportivo, undermined the coaching staff's confidence in him – then aggravated the injury by playing in a Euro 2008 qualifier in September, and did not appear for Valencia until October.

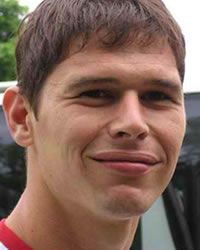
Pictured in 2008

He made his debut as a second-half substitute in Valencia's Champions League group-stage defeat at home to Chelsea, and started the next league match, another home defeat against Espanyol, but was selected only infrequently either by Quique Flores, who had signed him, or by successor Ronald Koeman. With the transfer window approaching, Koeman had given Žigić two weeks to convince him he was worth keeping. Prior to the Copa del Rey on 19 December, Valencia had not scored for six matches, and they were soon 1–0 down to third-tier opponents Real Unión. Žigić came on and scored twice to turn the match around, and followed up with another goal three days later as Valencia came from behind to secure a 2–2 draw at Real Zaragoza. A mooted loan to English club Portsmouth fell through when Koeman changed his mind about the player leaving, but he made only nine league appearances (two starts) in what remained of the season, and was sent off in the first of those.

Speculation regarding moves to the Premier League came to nothing. By October, Žigić had appeared just once for Valencia, in the UEFA Cup, and an opportunity arose to join his former club, Racing Santander, on an emergency loan. This depended on the league allowing Racing to release Luis Fernández on medical grounds, because of a degenerative condition of his knee, thus freeing up a space in the first-team squad. The LFP's medical committee decided that the condition was not yet clearly career-ending, so any agreement with Žigić had to be held over until the January 2009 transfer window. In the meantime, he played in four more cup matches for Valencia, two domestic and two UEFA, and scored in three of them, but took no part in the league campaign.

The loan agreement was duly revived, and Žigić returned to the club and the city that "feel like home". Racing were to pay his wages and write off the debt outstanding from the sale of Mario Regueiro, and there was no option to purchase. Resuming his partnership with Munitis in the first game of his second spell, Žigić scored the only goal of the visit to Real Valladolid, repeated the feat at Getafe two weeks later, and scored again in the next match, a 2–0 win away at Sevilla. He finished the season as Racing's top scorer, with 13 goals from only 19 games.

In the 2009 close season, there were rumours linking Žigić with moves to clubs including Sunderland, Monaco, and Bordeaux, but the player insisted his intention was and always had been to be successful with Valencia. He made 26 appearances for the club in 2009–10 in all competitions, more than in the previous two seasons combined, but only 5 were league starts. Within four minutes of replacing the injured David Villa in the league match against Racing in October, he took advantage of a defensive error to score the only goal of the game; out of respect for his former club, he did not celebrate. On 2 January 2010, his 93rd-minute header against Espanyol took Valencia third in the table, and his double against Deportivo La Coruña in the 2009–10 Copa del Rey put Valencia 2–0 up at half-time; the game finished 2–2 and Valencia lost 4–3 on aggregate. With four minutes left of the Europa League quarter-final second leg, Valencia were denied a penalty when an Atlético Madrid defender pulled Žigić to the ground so forcefully that a large hole was torn in the front of his shirt, apparently unnoticed by referee or goalline official; the tie ended goalless, so Atlético progressed on away goals from the first leg and went on to win the competition. Away to Espanyol on 1 May, again as a substitute for Villa, he scored both goals in a 2–0 win that secured Valencia a place in the next season's Champions League.

=== Birmingham City ===
On 25 May 2010, Žigić signed a four-year contract with Premier League club Birmingham City for an undisclosed fee, which media speculation suggested to be in the region of £6 million. He made his debut on the opening day of the season away at Sunderland: replacing Garry O'Connor in the 58th minute, he came close to scoring from outside the penalty area and "injected a note of panic hitherto undetected" in the home team's defence as Birmingham came back from 2–0 down to secure a draw. Žigić's first goal for the club came as Birmingham beat Milton Keynes Dons 3–1 in the League Cup on 21 September. He scored his first Premier League goal on 16 October, opening the scoring at Arsenal with a header from Keith Fahey's cross, but Birmingham lost the game 2–1.

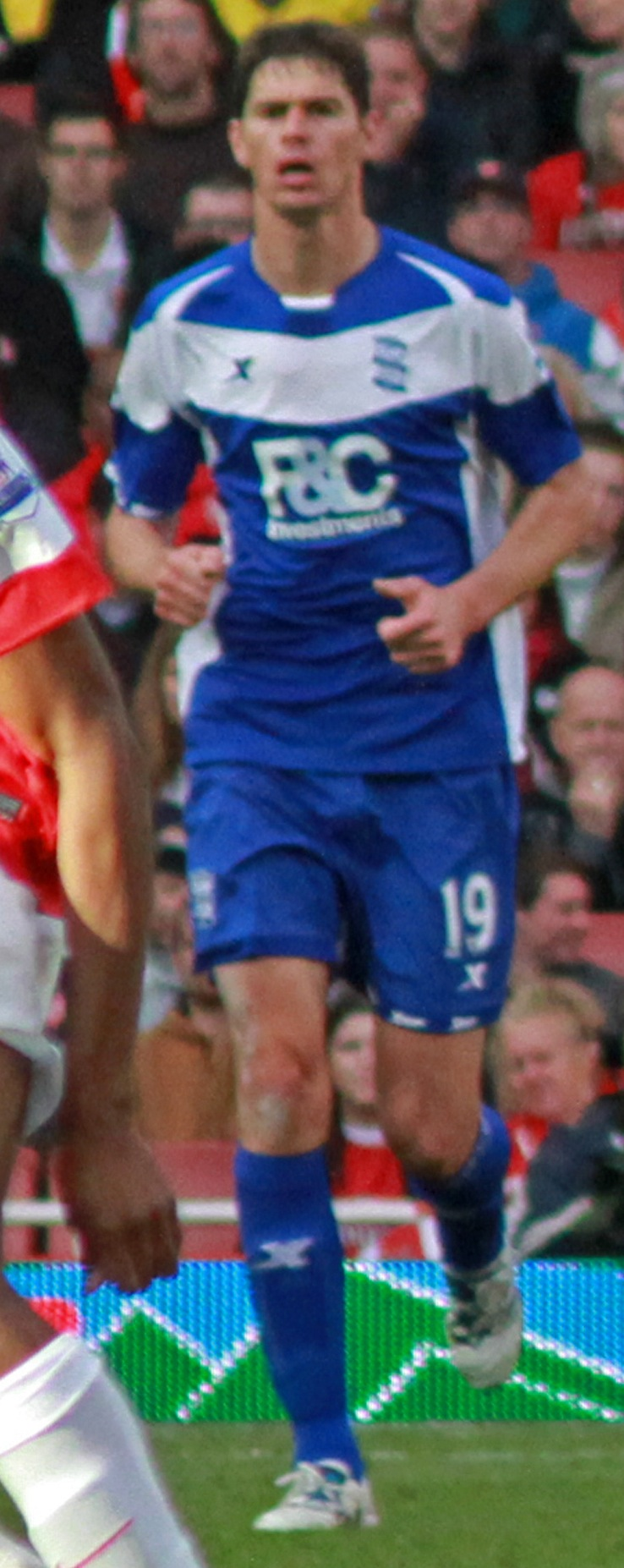
Žigić with Birmingham in 2010

In a hostile League Cup quarter-final against local rivals Aston Villa, Žigić had an apparently valid goal disallowed for offside against another player, and with the scores level after 86 minutes, was about to be substituted when he produced a "mis-hit, deflected, scruffy late goal" that secured the win. He opened the scoring against favourites Arsenal in the final with a short-range header, and with one minute of normal time remaining, he flicked on a long clearance, Arsenal's goalkeeper and central defender got in each other's way, and the ball fell to Obafemi Martins to tap in the winning goal. Football manager turned commentator David Pleat wrote that "Birmingham earned their victory through terrific teamwork and astute deployment of Žigić's strengths." Because of "niggling" hip and groin injuries, he made only two more substitute appearances. His absence deprived the team of what the Birmingham Mail's reporter called their "most effective style: getting the ball forward early, pressing up the pitch and playing off him", as they were relegated to the Championship.

Despite his agent Milan Ćalasan's insistence that his client would not be playing in the lower divisions, Žigić underwent groin surgery in the close season and resumed his Birmingham career in September. He told the Mail that he would be happy to stay and that any move would depend on the club, which was in increasing financial difficulty, wanting to sell. His first Championship goal gave Birmingham a 1–0 win against Leeds United. Early in the Europa League group match at Braga, Birmingham were awarded a penalty. In the absence of regular penalty-taker Marlon King, Žigić took on the responsibility. His attempt was saved, Braga won the match 1–0, and Birmingham finished the group one point behind them and Club Brugge so failed to qualify for the knockout rounds. Away to Leeds, Žigić scored all four in a 4–1 win, and he finished the season with eleven in the league and one in the play-off semi-final as Birmingham lost on aggregate to Blackpool.

Ahead of the 2012–13 season, Žigić was close to a return to Spain with Real Mallorca. Birmingham were prepared to give him a free transfer to reduce the wage bill by his reported £50,000 a week, but the deal fell through when board and agent could not agree a payoff for the player, who earlier in the summer had expressed his intention to see out the two years left on his contract. He began the playing season on the bench, coming off it after 85 minutes to produce a 94th-minute equaliser at home to Charlton Athletic on the opening day, and was used more as substitute than starter by new manager Lee Clark, who preferred Peter Løvenkrands or Leroy Lita. On the eve of the January transfer window, chief executive Peter Pannu confirmed that player sales were necessary to stave off the risk of administration. Even if the club could raise as much as £6M from the sale of England goalkeeper Jack Butland, Žigić's wages were more than the club could afford, and the player needed "to go out and showcase himself." The club had failed to include a clause in his contract to reduce his wages in the event of relegation, and it emerged later that they had agreed to substantial annual increments.

He did not leave, and in February, Clark publicly criticised him for producing "possibly the worst training session in terms of a professional footballer I have ever come across", despite knowing he was due to start the upcoming game against Watford. Up until this incident, he had scored six league goals at a rate of one every 165 minutes, and been sent off twice. Clark said that Žigić would not be involved against Watford, but that it was "in his hands" as to whether he would prepare properly for the Sheffield Wednesday fixture three days later. His response must have been acceptable, because he played the whole of the goalless draw against Wednesday, started all the remaining matches – the longest run of starts of his Birmingham career – and ended the season with nine league goals, second only to King.

Žigić missed the first few weeks of the 2013–14 season with a back problem, and once fit, played regularly throughout the season, as one of a small number of senior players in an inexperienced and youthful team with numerous short-term loanees. The team struggled, and reached the last day of the season needing at least a draw away at Bolton Wanderers and for other results to favour them to avoid relegation to League One. Two goals down with 12 minutes left, Žigić scored, and three minutes into stoppage time, his close-range header was cleared off the line to Paul Caddis, who headed home to preserve Birmingham's second-tier status. Birmingham were reported to be "quietly confident" of retaining his services for another season, at a much reduced salary, especially as he was believed to be keen on applying for British citizenship, which required five years' residence, but he left at the end of his contract. He was the last remaining member of the League Cup-winning team.

Having been without a club since his departure, Žigić began training with Birmingham again in November 2014. After a successful appeal to be granted a work permit, for which he did not qualify automatically, he signed a contract on 4 December to expire at the end of the season. He made his second debut as a late substitute in the Championship match at home to Reading on 13 December, with Birmingham already 6–1 ahead. He played only infrequently – nine substitute appearances in the league and two FA Cup matches – and the club confirmed he would be released when his contract expired.

== International career ==
Coach Ilija Petković gave Žigić his international debut for Serbia and Montenegro on 31 March 2004, as an 84th-minute substitute in a 1–0 friendly defeat against Norway in Belgrade. His next appearance and first start came some 14 months later; in a friendly against Italy in Canada, he ran onto a through ball and went round the goalkeeper to open the scoring and also hit the post in a 1–1 draw.

He also scored in his next match, against Poland in another friendly, and established himself as a regular selection, but it was his substitute appearance in a crucial World Cup qualifier against Spain in Madrid in September 2005 that brought him wider international recognition. After a poor first-half – Petković said they "were lucky to be only a goal down at half-time" – Žigić was introduced, and the tactic of "putting him in the centre of the opposition defence and playing long high balls to him ... was remarkably successful". He pressured the goalkeeper into missing a cross which dropped for Dejan Stanković to set up Mateja Kežman's equaliser, and 12 minutes later, his pass left Kežman clear on goal but he mis-hit what might have been a winning shot. The result left Serbia-Montenegro top of the group, and they confirmed their qualification at home to Bosnia and Herzegovina when Žigić's assist gave Kežman a tap-in for the only goal of the game.

Žigić's only start at the 2006 World Cup came in the last fixture, when his team had already been eliminated after losing the first two group matches. He scored early in the first half off a long ball from Stanković against Ivory Coast – the goal was Serbia-Montenegro's first of the tournament – but the match ended in a 3–2 defeat.

Still an automatic choice under new national manager Javier Clemente, Žigić scored the only goal in Serbia's first competitive match as a separate country, a Euro 2008 qualifier at home to Azerbaijan in September 2006. He scored once, missed two more good chances and was then sent off for elbowing an opponent in stoppage time of the March 2007 qualifying defeat in Kazakhstan, so missed the next, a home draw with Portugal, and also missed the Finland fixture in June after surgery on a facial injury. He still scored seven goals as Serbia failed to qualify.

Žigić played regularly through the 2010 World Cup qualifying campaign under the management of Radomir Antić, contributing three goals and partnering former Red Star teammate Marko Pantelić as Serbia qualified for a major tournament for the first time as an independent nation. Ahead of the tournament proper, he spoke in positive terms of his development since 2006: "I went to Germany as player with no reputation or real experience to speak of. Tactically, I have learned a lot and I'm in much better condition, both physically and psychologically. This is my World Cup, I think I can play a lead role and I want to show I'm a player that can do it in big games." After losing to Ghana in the opening group match, Serbia went on to face Germany. Within two minutes of Miroslav Klose's first-half dismissal, Žigić headed a cross down to Milan Jovanović who scored what proved to be the only goal of the game; Lukas Podolski's second-half penalty was saved, and Antić dedicated the victory to the Serbian people. In a game of missed chances against Australia, Serbia lost 2–1 and finished bottom of the group.

Goals in four of Serbia's five internationals in the latter part of 2010 brought his total to 20. He was not selected to start the other match, a Euro 2012 qualifier in Italy that was abandoned after six minutes because of crowd trouble; UEFA awarded the match to the hosts as a 3–0 win. After Serbia failed to qualify for the tournament, both Stanković and Nemanja Vidić retired from international football, and Žigić was appointed captain of the national team. He captained the team in friendly defeats to Mexico and Honduras in 2011, his 56th and 57th appearances for his country, which proved to be his last.

== Style of play ==
Žigić's extreme height predisposes him to an aerial game. He is dangerous from set pieces, scoring many headed goals and knocking the ball down for others: when he joined Red Star, the coach set out the team in a 4–3–3 formation, with Žigić at centre-forward and two wingers to feed those strengths. He tried to use his physical presence to disrupt opposing defences, both for his own benefit and to draw their attentions away from others. Pep Guardiola said in 2009 that Žigić was not easy to defend against, "almost unstoppable" in the air, but the best way would be to keep him as far as possible away from the penalty area. Speaking in 2010, Radovan Ćurčić, then assistant manager of the Serbia national team, described him as "the king of air play, he is the finest there is in Europe. He possesses the sense of space and movement without the ball and can assist his teammates with headers and set up goal-scoring opportunities." Sid Lowe of The Guardian also described him as a "tidy finisher" in 2007.

As exemplified on his debut for Racing, a performance in which he demonstrated his aerial power, he is capable of playing with his back to goal, and his height was not incompatible with agility. He prefers to play not as a lone striker but in partnership with a shorter, speedier, teammate. Racing's fitness coach, Javier Miñano, was surprised that Žigić was "well coordinated, to the extent that he doesn't seem so tall when I see him in training."

He prefers to receive the ball in the air, because he can always beat smaller players in the air but they can take advantage of better acceleration and quicker reactions on the ground. According to David Pleat, a major factor in Birmingham's 2011 League Cup win was "telling him to do what he does best and flick the ball on with his head from direct diagonal balls played from both wings". Nevertheless, he is technically competent, scoring goals with his feet and providing assists for others. A 2009 feature in Mundo Deportivo assessed Žigić as one of those few tall players with a good touch on the ball, and in 2010, German international defender Per Mertesacker described him as "technically a good player and very smart tactically".

== Career statistics ==
=== Club ===
Appearances and goals by club, season and competition
Club	Season	League			National Cup		League Cup		Other		Total	
Club	Season	Division	Apps	Goals	Apps	Goals	Apps	Goals	Apps	Goals	Apps	Goals
AIK Bačka Topola	1998–99	Serbian League Vojvodina	14	8			—		—		14	8
AIK Bačka Topola	1999–2000	Serbian League Vojvodina	28	28			—		—		28	28
AIK Bačka Topola	2000–01	Serbian League Vojvodina	30	30			—		—		30	30
AIK Bačka Topola	2001–02	Serbian League Vojvodina	4	2			—		—		4	2
AIK Bačka Topola	Total		76	68			—		—		76	68
Mornar	2001–02	Second League of FR Yugoslavia	23	15			—		—		23	15
Kolubara	2002–03	Serbian League Belgrade	8	3			—		—		8	3
Spartak Subotica	2002–03	Serbian League Vojvodina	11	14			—		—		11	14
Red Star Belgrade	2003–04	First League of Serbia and Montenegro	28	18	3	2	—		5 (Note: Appearance(s) in UEFA Cup)	6	36	26
Red Star Belgrade	2004–05	First League of Serbia and Montenegro	25	15	3	2	—		5 (Note: Three appearances three goals in UEFA Champions League, two appearances in UEFA Cup)	3	33	20
Red Star Belgrade	2005–06	Serbia and Montenegro SuperLiga	23	12	3	2	—		7	6	33	20
Red Star Belgrade	2006–07	Serbian SuperLiga	3	2	0	0	—		4 (Note: Appearance(s) in UEFA Champions League)	2	7	4
Red Star Belgrade	Total		79	47	9	6	—		21	17	109	70
Racing Santander	2006–07	La Liga	32	11	1	0	—		—		33	11
Valencia	2007–08	La Liga	15	1	3	4	—		3	0	21	5
Valencia	2008–09	La Liga	0	0	2	1	—		3	2	5	3
Valencia	2009–10	La Liga	13	4	4	3	—		9 (Note: Appearance(s) in UEFA Europa League)	2	26	9
Valencia	Total		28	5	9	8	—		15	4	52	17
Racing Santander (loan)	2008–09	La Liga	19	13	—		—		—		19	13
Birmingham City	2010–11	Premier League	25	5	2	0	7	3	—		34	8
Birmingham City	2011–12	Championship	35	11	1	0	1	0	6 (Note: Five appearances in UEFA Europa League, one appearance one goal in Football League play-offs)	1	43	12
Birmingham City	2012–13	Championship	35	9	1	0	0	0	—		36	9
Birmingham City	2013–14	Championship	33	7	1	0	1	0	—		35	7
Birmingham City	2014–15	Championship	9	0	2	0	—		—		11	0
Birmingham City	Total		137	32	7	0	9	3	6	1	159	36
Career total			413	208	26	14	9	3	42	22	490	247

=== International ===
Appearances and goals by national team and year
National team	Year	Apps	Goals
Serbia and Montenegro; Serbia	2004	1	0
Serbia and Montenegro; Serbia	2005	9	3
Serbia and Montenegro; Serbia	2006	9	4
Serbia and Montenegro; Serbia	2007	7	4
Serbia and Montenegro; Serbia	2008	7	2
Serbia and Montenegro; Serbia	2009	8	3
Serbia and Montenegro; Serbia	2010	12	4
Serbia and Montenegro; Serbia	2011	4	0
Total		57	20

Score and result columns list Serbia and Montenegro/Serbia's score first.

International goals
Goal	Date	Venue	Opponent	Score	Result	Competition
1.	8 June 2005	Rogers Centre, Toronto, Canada	Italy	1–0	1–1	Friendly
2.	15 August 2005	Lobanovsky Dynamo Stadium, Kiev, Ukraine	Poland	1–1	2–3	Friendly
3.	13 November 2005	Nanjing Olympic Sports Center, Nanjing, China	China	2–0	2–0	Friendly
4.	21 June 2006	Allianz Arena, Munich, Germany	Ivory Coast	1–0	2–3	2006 World Cup
5.	2 September 2006	Stadion Crvena Zvezda, Belgrade, Serbia	Azerbaijan	1–0	1–0	Euro 2008 qualifying
6.	7 October 2006	Stadion Crvena Zvezda, Belgrade, Serbia	Belgium	1–0	1–0	Euro 2008 qualifying
7.	11 October 2006	Stadion Crvena Zvezda, Belgrade, Serbia	Armenia	3–0	3–0	Euro 2008 qualifying
8.	24 March 2007	Almaty Central Stadium, Almaty, Kazakhstan	Kazakhstan	1–2	1–2	Euro 2008 qualifying
9.	17 October 2007	Tofik Bakhramov Stadium, Baku, Azerbaijan	Azerbaijan	2–0	6–1	Euro 2008 qualifying
10.	17 October 2007	Tofik Bakhramov Stadium, Baku, Azerbaijan	Azerbaijan	4–1	6–1	Euro 2008 qualifying
11.	21 November 2007	Stadion Crvena Zvezda, Belgrade, Serbia	Poland	1–2	2–2	Euro 2008 qualifying
12.	6 September 2008	Stadion Crvena Zvezda, Belgrade, Serbia	Faroe Islands	2–0	2–0	2010 World Cup qualifying
13.	11 October 2008	Stadion Crvena Zvezda, Belgrade, Serbia	Lithuania	3–0	3–0	2010 World Cup qualifying
14.	1 April 2009	Stadion Partizan, Belgrade, Serbia	Sweden	1–0	2–0	Friendly
15.	10 October 2009	Stadion Crvena Zvezda, Belgrade, Serbia	Romania	1–0	5–0	2010 World Cup qualifying
16.	18 November 2009	Craven Cottage, London, England	South Korea	1–0	1–0	Friendly
17.	3 September 2010	Tórsvøllur, Tórshavn, Faroe Islands	Faroe Islands	3–0	3–0	Euro 2012 qualifying
18.	7 September 2010	Stadion Crvena Zvezda, Belgrade, Serbia	Slovenia	1–1	1–1	Euro 2012 qualifying
19.	8 October 2010	Stadion Partizan, Belgrade, Serbia	Estonia	1–0	1–3	Euro 2012 qualifying
20.	17 November 2010	Vasil Levski National Stadium, Sofia, Bulgaria	Bulgaria	1–0	1–0	Friendly

== Honours ==
Red Star

- First League of Serbia and Montenegro: 2003–04, 2005–06
- Serbia and Montenegro Cup: 2003–04, 2005–06

Valencia

- Copa del Rey: 2007–08

Birmingham City

- Football League Cup: 2010–11

Individual

- Serbia and Montenegro League: top scorer 2003–04
- Serbian Footballer of the Year: 2003, 2007
- Večernje novosti captains' poll
  - Domestic player of the year: 2003, 2005
  - Prva zvezda (Player of the year based abroad): 2006
- Red Star Sport Association Best Male Athlete: 2005
