= Dušan Đokić =

Serbian footballer

Personal information
- Full name: Dušan Đokić
- Date of birth: 20 February 1980 (age 46)
- Place of birth: Prokuplje, SFR Yugoslavia
- Height: 1.84 m (6 ft 0 in)
- Position: Striker

Youth career
- Topličanin

Senior career*
Years	Team	Apps	(Gls)
1997–1998	Topličanin	29	(13)
1998–2000	Dinamo Pančevo	26	(7)
2000–2002	Rad	33	(2)
2002–2003	Zemun	30	(10)
2003–2004	Obilić	43	(20)
2005	Železnik	13	(4)
2005	Voždovac	17	(10)
2006–2007	Red Star Belgrade	37	(22)
2007–2010	Club Brugge	28	(4)
2008–2009	→ Omonia (loan)	7	(0)
2009–2010	→ Astra Ploieşti (loan)	10	(3)
2010	→ Chongqing Lifan (loan)	6	(0)
2010–2011	Zagłębie Lubin	6	(0)
2011–2012	Najran	13	(4)
2012–2013	Voždovac	16	(4)
2013–2014	Dinamo Pančevo	40	(12)
2014–2015	Zemun	15	(2)
2016	Smederevo 1924	10	(8)
Total		379	(125)

Managerial career
- 2022: Sloga Kraljevo
- 2022: Jagodina
- 2024: Omladinac Novi Banovci
- 2024-2025: OFK Kikinda
- * Club domestic league appearances and goals

Dušan Đokić (Serbian Cyrillic: Душан Ђокић; born February 20, 1980) is a Serbian retired footballer who played as a striker.

== Career ==
=== Serbian clubs ===
In his career he played for Topličanin, Dinamo Pančevo, Rad, Zemun, Obilić, Železnik, Voždovac, but his career started taking off when he joined Red Star Belgrade in January 2006. Almost 26 years of age at this point, Đokić had a great half-season scoring 8 goals from 9 league appearances during the second half of the 2005–06 season, helping Red Star to the league title.

He scored 14 goals over his next full season at Red Star, becoming the club's top striker en route to another league championship.

=== Club Brugge ===
During summer 2007, he was sold to Club Brugge.

In January 2009, he was loaned to AC Omonia for six months. In September 2009, he was loaned to Astra Ploiești for another four months.

On 10 March 2010, Đokić joined Chinese Super League side Chongqing Lifan on loan.

=== Zagłębie Lubin ===
In summer 2010, he joined Zagłębie Lubin on a two-year contract.

=== Najran ===
He signed a two-year contract with Saudi Professional League side Najran SC on 5 September 2011.

=== Dinamo Pančevo ===
In the winter of 2013, he joined Dinamo Pančevo.

== Honours ==
Red Star Belgrade

- Serbian SuperLiga: 2005–06, 2006–07
- Serbian Cup: 2005–06, 2006–07
