= 2005–06 Serbia and Montenegro SuperLiga =

First League of Serbia and Montenegro
- Season: 2005–06
- Champions: Red Star; 25th domestic title
- Relegated: Javor; Rad; Obilić
- Champions League: Red Star
- UEFA Cup: Partizan; Hajduk Kula; OFK Beograd
- Intertoto Cup: Zeta
- Matches: 240
- Goals: 571 (2.38 per match)
- Top goalscorer: Srđan Radonjić (20)

The 2005–06 Serbia and Montenegro Superliga (officially known as the Meridian SuperLiga for sponsorship reasons) was the fourth and last season of Serbia and Montenegro's top-level football league before the dissolution. It was contested by 16 teams (13 from Serbia and 3 from Montenegro), and Red Star Belgrade won the championship.

== Teams ==
Radnički Jugopetrol, Čukarički Stankom and Hajduk Beograd were relegated to the 2005–06 Serbian First League while Sutjeska was relegated to the 2005–06 Montenegrin First League after the last season for finishing last.

The relegated teams were replaced by 2004–05 Serbian First League champions Budućnost Banatski Dvor and runners-up Javor Ivanjica, Rad and Voždovac. The league would also join the 2004–05 Montenegrin First League champion Jedinstvo Bijelo Polje

Location of teams in the 2005–06 SuperLiga

| Club | City | Stadium | Capacity |
|---|---|---|---|
| Partizan | Belgrade | Partizan Stadium | 32,710 |
| Red Star | Belgrade | Red Star Stadium | 55,538 |
| Vojvodina | Novi Sad | Karađorđe Stadium | 17,204 |
| Zemun | Zemun, Belgrade | Zemun Stadium | 10,000 |
| Hajduk Kula | Kula | Stadion Hajduk | 6,000 |
| Obilić | Belgrade | FK Obilić Stadium | 4,500 |
| Voždovac | Belgrade | Železnik Stadium | 8,000 |
| OFK Beograd | Karaburma, Belgrade | Omladinski Stadium | 20,000 |
| Smederevo | Smederevo | Smederevo City Stadium | 17,200 |
| Zeta | Golubovci | Stadion Trešnjica | 7,000 |
| Borac | Čačak | Čačak Stadium | 6,000 |
| Budućnost Podgorica | Podgorica | Podgorica City Stadium | 17,000 |
| Jedinstvo | Bijelo Polje | Gradski stadion (Bijelo Polje) | 5,000 |
| Javor | Ivanjica | Stadion Ivanjica | 5,000 |
| Budućnost Banatski Dvor | Banatski Dvor | Stadion Mirko Vučurević | 4,000 |
| Rad | Belgrade | Stadion Kralj Petar I | 6,000 |

== League table ==
| Pos | Team | Pld | W | D | L | GF | GA | GD | Pts | Qualification or relegation |
|---|---|---|---|---|---|---|---|---|---|---|
| 1 | Red Star Belgrade (C) | 30 | 25 | 3 | 2 | 73 | 23 | +50 | 78 | Qualification for Champions League second qualifying round |
| 2 | Partizan | 30 | 22 | 5 | 3 | 53 | 17 | +36 | 71 | Qualification for UEFA Cup second qualifying round (Note: OFK Beograd qualified for 2006–07 UEFA Cup as runner-up of 2005–06 Serbia and Montenegro Cup.) |
| 3 | Voždovac | 30 | 15 | 6 | 9 | 52 | 38 | +14 | 51 | Ineligible for 2006–07 European competitions |
| 4 | Hajduk Kula | 30 | 13 | 11 | 6 | 41 | 26 | +15 | 50 | Qualification for UEFA Cup second qualifying round |
| 5 | Zeta | 30 | 14 | 5 | 11 | 42 | 36 | +6 | 47 | Qualification for Intertoto Cup second round and Montenegrin First League |
| 6 | OFK Beograd | 30 | 13 | 5 | 12 | 35 | 29 | +6 | 44 | Qualification for UEFA Cup second qualifying round |
| 7 | Borac Čačak | 30 | 12 | 8 | 10 | 32 | 27 | +5 | 44 | |
| 8 | Budućnost Banatski Dvor | 30 | 13 | 5 | 12 | 34 | 31 | +3 | 44 | |
| 9 | Vojvodina | 30 | 11 | 10 | 9 | 28 | 27 | +1 | 43 | |
| 10 | Zemun | 30 | 11 | 8 | 11 | 34 | 39 | −5 | 41 | |
| 11 | Smederevo | 30 | 11 | 6 | 13 | 30 | 37 | −7 | 39 | |
| 12 | Javor Ivanjica (R) | 30 | 8 | 8 | 14 | 22 | 35 | −13 | 32 | Relegation to Serbian First League |
| 13 | Rad (R) | 30 | 9 | 4 | 17 | 27 | 35 | −8 | 31 | Relegation to Serbian First League |
| 14 | Budućnost Podgorica (Note: Budućnost Podgorica were deducted 3 points due to leaving the pitch in protest 11 minutes before full time during their March 2006 match versus FK Zeta. In the match, FK Zeta had just scored an equalizer that Budućnost felt was offside.) | 30 | 6 | 10 | 14 | 24 | 43 | −19 | 25 | Qualification for Montenegrin First League |
| 15 | Obilić (R) | 30 | 3 | 6 | 21 | 23 | 53 | −30 | 15 | Relegation to Serbian First League |
| 16 | Jedinstvo Bijelo Polje | 30 | 3 | 2 | 25 | 18 | 72 | −54 | 11 | Qualification for Montenegrin First League |

Source: RSSSF.org
Rules for classification: 1) points; 2) goal difference; 3) number of goals scored.
(C) Champions; (R) Relegated

== Results ==
| Home \ Away | BOR | BBD | BUD | HAJ | JAV | JED | OBI | OFK | PAR | RAD | RSB | SME | VOJ | VŽD | ZEM | ZET |
|---|---|---|---|---|---|---|---|---|---|---|---|---|---|---|---|---|
| Borac Čačak | | 0–1 | 2–0 | 1–0 | 0–0 | 2–0 | 1–3 | 1–1 | 0–2 | 2–1 | 2–1 | 4–0 | 1–0 | 0–1 | 2–0 | 0–1 |
| Budućnost Banatski Dvor | 0–1 | | 2–1 | 2–0 | 1–1 | 5–1 | 3–0 | 1–0 | 1–1 | 0–1 | 0–3 | 2–0 | 1–0 | 0–0 | 3–0 | 3–1 |
| Budućnost Podgorica | 1–1 | 0–2 | | 0–0 | 3–1 | 2–0 | 2–1 | 2–2 | 0–1 | 2–1 | 1–2 | 1–2 | 0–0 | 2–0 | 1–1 | 1–1 |
| Hajduk Kula | 2–2 | 1–0 | 1–0 | | 3–0 | 2–0 | 1–0 | 3–0 | 0–0 | 1–0 | 2–2 | 1–0 | 0–0 | 2–0 | 6–1 | 3–1 |
| Javor Ivanjica | 0–2 | 4–2 | 0–0 | 0–0 | | 1–0 | 0–0 | 1–0 | 0–1 | 1–0 | 1–2 | 1–0 | 2–2 | 0–1 | 2–0 | 1–0 |
| Jedinstvo Bijelo Polje | 2–1 | 2–0 | 0–1 | 1–3 | 0–2 | | 2–1 | 0–1 | 2–3 | 1–4 | 0–4 | 2–3 | 1–1 | 2–2 | 0–2 | 0–4 |
| Obilić | 0–0 | 1–0 | 0–0 | 0–1 | 0–0 | 5–0 | | 0–1 | 0–2 | 0–1 | 2–3 | 0–2 | 0–1 | 2–5 | 0–2 | 0–0 |
| OFK Beograd | 1–1 | 0–1 | 3–0 | 2–1 | 3–2 | 4–0 | 3–1 | | 0–1 | 1–0 | 0–1 | 3–0 | 0–1 | 2–2 | 2–0 | 0–1 |
| Partizan | 1–0 | 2–0 | 3–0 | 0–0 | 6–0 | 2–0 | 4–2 | 0–1 | | 2–0 | 0–0 | 2–1 | 3–0 | 2–3 | 0–0 | 1–0 |
| Rad | 0–3 | 0–1 | 2–1 | 0–0 | 1–0 | 2–0 | 1–1 | 1–2 | 1–2 | | 2–4 | 0–2 | 1–1 | 3–1 | 0–1 | 3–0 |
| Red Star | 1–0 | 5–1 | 4–0 | 4–1 | 2–0 | 4–0 | 4–2 | 2–0 | 2–0 | 1–0 | | 2–0 | 3–1 | 3–1 | 2–1 | 3–2 |
| Smederevo | 0–0 | 1–1 | 1–1 | 1–1 | 1–0 | 1–0 | 3–1 | 2–1 | 0–1 | 0–1 | 1–3 | | 1–0 | 1–2 | 3–2 | 4–1 |
| Vojvodina | 0–1 | 1–0 | 0–0 | 0–0 | 1–1 | 2–0 | 1–0 | 1–0 | 2–3 | 2–0 | 1–0 | 1–0 | | 2–2 | 2–1 | 3–1 |
| Voždovac | 4–0 | 1–1 | 4–1 | 2–1 | 2–1 | 3–1 | 4–0 | 0–1 | 1–3 | 2–1 | 0–2 | 3–0 | 2–0 | | 1–2 | 1–0 |
| Zemun | 1–1 | 2–0 | 3–1 | 2–2 | 1–0 | 2–1 | 2–0 | 3–1 | 0–2 | 0–0 | 0–2 | 0–0 | 1–1 | 2–2 | | 2–1 |
| Zeta | 3–1 | 1–0 | 3–0 | 5–3 | 1–0 | 3–0 | 4–1 | 0–0 | 1–3 | 1–0 | 2–2 | 0–0 | 2–1 | 1–0 | 1–0 | |

Source: Soccerway
Legend: Blue = home team win; Yellow = draw; Red = away team win.

== Winning squad ==
Champions: RED STAR BELGRADE (coach: (Italy) Walter Zenga)

Players (league matches/league goals)

- (Serbia and Montenegro) Milan Dudić (28/3)
- (Serbia and Montenegro) Aleksandar Luković (27/3)
- (Serbia and Montenegro) Boško Janković (26/12)
- (Serbia and Montenegro) Nenad Kovačević (25/1)
- (Serbia and Montenegro) Dušan Basta (25/0)
- (Serbia and Montenegro) Milan Purović (24/11)
- (Serbia and Montenegro) Nikola Žigić (23/12)
- (Serbia and Montenegro) Dejan Milovanović (23/2)
- (Serbia and Montenegro) Vladimir Stojković (21/0) (goalkeeper)
- (Serbia and Montenegro) Milan Biševac (20/0)
- (Serbia and Montenegro) Vladimir Mudrinić (20/0)
- (Serbia and Montenegro) Marko Perović (18/3)
- (Serbia and Montenegro) Nebojša Joksimović (18/0)
- (Serbia and Montenegro) Dragan Mladenović (17/3)
- (Serbia and Montenegro) Milanko Rašković (13/5)
- (Serbia and Montenegro) Nikola Trajković (13/2)
- (Serbia and Montenegro) Nenad Milijaš (10/4) signed from FK Zemun on January 12, 2006 during winter 2005/06 transfer window
- (Serbia and Montenegro) Dušan Đokić (9/8) signed from FK Voždovac in late January 2006 during winter 2005/06 transfer window
- (Serbia and Montenegro) Radovan Krivokapić (9/0)
- (Serbia and Montenegro) Ivan Ranđelović (9/0) (goalkeeper)
- (Serbia and Montenegro) Ardian Đokaj (8/2)
- (Serbia and Montenegro) Bojan Miladinović (6/0)
- (Japan) Takayuki Suzuki (6/0) signed from Kashima Antlers on January 28, 2006 during winter 2005/06 transfer window
- (Ghana) Haminu Draman (4/1)
- (Serbia and Montenegro) Boban Stojanović (4/0)
- (Serbia and Montenegro) Dušan Anđelković (3/0) signed from FK Voždovac in late January 2006 during winter 2005/06 transfer window
- (Serbia and Montenegro) Marko Pantelić (3/0) sold to Hertha BSC Berlin on the last day of the 2005 summer transfer window (August 31, 2005)
- (Serbia and Montenegro) Zoran Banović (1/0) (goalkeeper)
- (Serbia and Montenegro) Filip Đorđević (1/0)
- (Serbia and Montenegro) Slavoljub Đorđević (1/0)
- (Serbia and Montenegro) Nenad Tomović (1/0)
- (Serbia and Montenegro) Jagoš Vuković (1/0)

== Top goalscorers ==
| Rank | Player | Club | Goals |
|---|---|---|---|
| 1 | (Serbia and Montenegro) Srđan Radonjić | Partizan | 20 |
| 2 | (Serbia and Montenegro) Dušan Đokić | Voždovac/Red Star | 19 |
| 3 | (Serbia and Montenegro) Boško Janković | Red Star | 12 |
| 3 | (Serbia and Montenegro) Dražen Milić | Zeta | 12 |
| 3 | (Serbia and Montenegro) Nenad Milijaš | Zemun/Red Star | 12 |
| 3 | (Serbia and Montenegro) Nikola Žigić | Red Star | 12 |
| 7 | (Serbia and Montenegro) Dejan Osmanović | Hajduk Kula | 11 |
| 7 | (Serbia and Montenegro) Milan Purović | Red Star | 11 |
| 9 | (Serbia and Montenegro) Jovan Damjanović | Borac Čačak | 9 |
| 9 | (Serbia and Montenegro) Nikola Drinčić | Budućnost Banatski Dvor | 9 |
| 9 | (Serbia and Montenegro) Nebojša Marinković | Partizan/Voždovac | 9 |
| 9 | (Serbia and Montenegro) Ljubiša Vukelja | Vojvodina | 9 |
| 9 | (Serbia and Montenegro) Ivan Vuković | Zeta | 9 |
