= Marko Nikolić (footballer, born June 1989) =

Serbian footballer

Personal information
- Full name: Marko Nikolić
- Date of birth: June 9, 1989 (age 37)
- Place of birth: Belgrade, SFR Yugoslavia
- Height: 1.79 m (5 ft 10 in)
- Position: Midfielder

Team information
- Current team: SV Türkspor Allach
- Number: 6

Youth career
- Red Star Belgrade

Senior career*
Years	Team	Apps	(Gls)
2006–2012	Red Star Belgrade	1	(0)
2007	→ Srem (loan)	10	(0)
2008	→ Bežanija (loan)	5	(0)
2008–2009	→ Srem (loan)	18	(0)
2009–2011	→ Sopot (loan)	42	(5)
2011–2012	→ Napredak Kruševac (loan)	6	(0)
2013	Valsta Syrianska IK	9	(0)
2013–2014	Voždovac	17	(0)
2014–2016	Velež Mostar	41	(0)
2016–2017	Grbalj	61	(1)
2017–2018	Žarkovo	8	(1)
2019	Tskhinvali	14	(0)
2020–2023	VfB Forstinning	3	(1)
2023–2024	Tempo Frankfurt	1	(0)
2024–	SV Türkspor Allach	12	(0)

International career
	Serbia U19	9	(1)
- * Club domestic league appearances and goals as of 17:41, 2 January 2021 (UTC)

Marko Nikolić (Serbian Cyrillic: Марко Николић; born June 9, 1989) is a Serbian footballer who plays for Türkspor Allach in Germany.

== Club career ==
Nikolić was scouted at the age of 12 by Red Star Belgrade, and he signed for the club in 2002 when he was only a 13-year-old. He has been moved from the U-19 Red Star Belgrade Academy to the first team during the season 2006-07, having made one league appearance in that season. The central midfielder or right winger, played the later 2012/2013 season with Swedish Division 1 Norra side Valsta Syrianska IK.

=== International career ===
He has made several appearances for the Serbia national under-19 football team.
