= Milan Purović =

Montenegrin footballer

Personal information
- Date of birth: 7 May 1985 (age 41)
- Place of birth: Titograd, SFR Yugoslavia
- Height: 1.93 m (6 ft 4 in)
- Position: Centre forward

Youth career
- Budućnost Podgorica

Senior career*
Years	Team	Apps	(Gls)
2002–2005	Budućnost Podgorica	72	(29)
2005–2007	Red Star Belgrade	46	(17)
2007–2011	Sporting CP	15	(2)
2008–2009	→ Kayserispor (loan)	16	(3)
2009	→ Videoton (loan)	7	(0)
2010	→ Olimpija Ljubljana (loan)	7	(1)
2010	→ Belenenses (loan)	7	(0)
2011	→ Cercle Brugge (loan)	4	(0)
2011–2012	OFK Beograd	15	(3)
2012–2013	Metalurh Zaporizhzhia	4	(0)
2013–2014	Bežanija	9	(2)
2014	Perak	5	(5)
2015	Kuantan	9	(3)
2017	Spartak Subotica	10	(0)
2017–2018	Radnik Surdulica	24	(4)
Total		250	(69)

International career
2002–2004	Serbia and Montenegro U19	9	(4)
2005	Serbia and Montenegro U21	4	(4)
2007–2008	Montenegro	7	(0)
- * Club domestic league appearances and goals

Milan Purović (Montenegrin: Милан Пуровић; born 7 May 1985) is a Montenegrin retired footballer who played as a centre forward.

== Club career ==
Born in Titograd, Montenegro, Socialist Federal Republic of Yugoslavia, Purović made his professional debuts with FK Budućnost Podgorica. He then played for Red Star Belgrade from 2005 to 2007, alongside Nikola Žigić, with the strikers standing at respectively 193 and 202 cm.

Purović attracted interest from several clubs outside Serbia, and signed for Sporting CP in the summer of 2007. However, he only managed two Primeira Liga goals in his first season (six all competitions comprised), and would be loaned to Turkish Süper Lig side Kayserispor for 2008–09.

In 2009–10 another loan ensued, as Purović joined Hungary's Videoton FC. It would be however a short-lived one, as in early 2010 he moved to Slovenia with NK Olimpija Ljubljana on yet another loan. He split the following campaign between another two teams, C.F. Os Belenenses in the Portuguese second level and Cercle Brugge K.S.V. in Belgium, both still on loan from Sporting; he appeared in only 11 league matches for the two clubs combined.

On 27 July 2011, Purović terminated his contract with the Lisbon-based club and signed for OFK Beograd. On 9 April 2014, after featuring rarely for both FC Metalurh Zaporizhzhia and FK Bežanija, he joined Malaysia Super League team Perak FA, replacing departed foreign player Želimir Terkeš. He made his debut against Johor Darul Takzim FC, six days later.

== International career ==
A member of the Montenegro national team, Purović made his debut against Hungary during his country's first international match as an independent country, on 24 March 2007. Previously, he represented Serbia and Montenegro under-21s at the 2006 UEFA European Under-21 Championship, alongside future Sporting teammates Vladimir Stojković and Simon Vukčević, and also appeared for FR Yugoslavia at the 2002 European Under-17 Championship.

He has earned a total of 7 caps, scoring no goals. His final international was a May 2008 friendly match away against Romania.

== Honours ==
Red Star

- Serbian SuperLiga: 2005–06, 2006–07
- Serbian Cup: 2005–06, 2006–07

Sporting

- Taça de Portugal: 2007–08
