= Nebojša Joksimović (footballer) =

Serbian footballer

Personal information
- Full name: Nebojša Joksimović
- Date of birth: 1 April 1981 (age 45)
- Place of birth: Čačak, SFR Yugoslavia
- Height: 1.94 m (6 ft 4 in)
- Position: Defender

Senior career*
Years	Team	Apps	(Gls)
1999–2001	Kolubara	35	(1)
2001–2002	Radnički Beograd	24	(1)
2002–2003	Radnički Obrenovac	30	(1)
2003	Vojvodina	2	(0)
2004	Radnički Obrenovac	13	(0)
2004–2007	Red Star Belgrade	44	(0)
2007–2008	Neuchâtel Xamax	13	(1)
2009–2010	Čukarički	12	(0)
Total		173	(4)
- * Club domestic league appearances and goals

Nebojša Joksimović (Serbian Cyrillic: Небојша Јоксимовић; born April 1, 1981) is a Serbian retired footballer who played as a defender.

== Honours ==
- Serbian SuperLiga (2): 2005–06, 2006-07
- Serbian Cup (2): 2005–06, 2006-07
