= Dušan Basta =

Serbian footballer (born 1984)

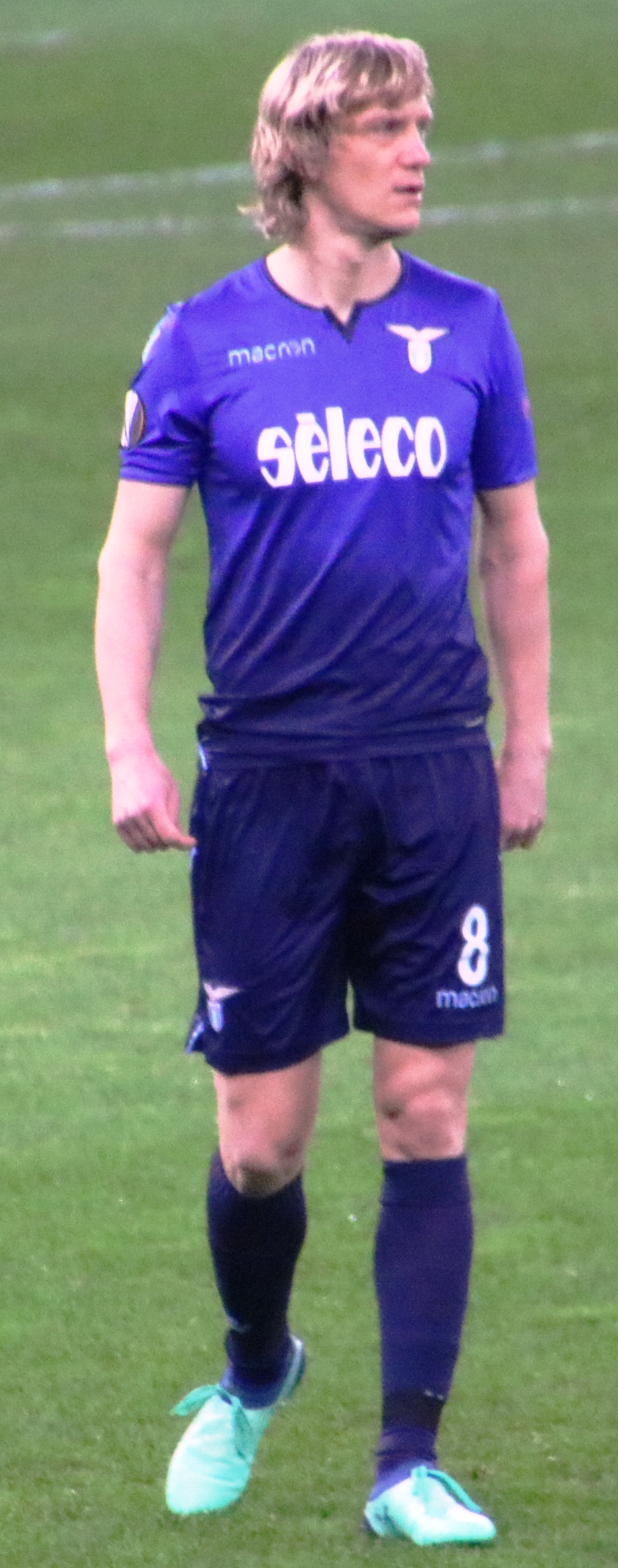
- Basta with Lazio in 2018

Personal information
- Full name: Dušan Basta
- Date of birth: 18 August 1984 (age 42)
- Place of birth: Belgrade, SR Serbia, SFR Yugoslavia
- Height: 1.83 m (6 ft 0 in)
- Positions: Right-back; right winger

Youth career
- PKB Padinska Skela
- Red Star Belgrade

Senior career*
Years	Team	Apps	(Gls)
2002–2008	Red Star Belgrade	97	(3)
2003–2004	→ Jedinstvo Ub (loan)	27	(9)
2008–2014	Udinese	105	(9)
2008–2009	→ Lecce (loan)	7	(0)
2014–2019	Lazio	88	(1)
Total		324	(22)

International career
2005–2018	Serbia (Note: Including 2 caps for Serbia and Montenegro)	18	(2)
Medal record
Silver medal – second place	UEFA Under-21 Championship	2007
- * Club domestic league appearances and goals

Dušan Basta (Serbian Cyrillic: Душан Баста, pronounced [dǔʃan bǎsta]; born 18 August 1984) is a Serbian former professional footballer who played as a right-back.

Basta made his international debut for Serbia and Montenegro in 2005, and later was selected in the squad for the 2006 FIFA World Cup. He was also capped for Serbia, making his final cap in 2018.

== Club career ==
=== Early years ===
The first football step Basta took was when he was eight – in local football club PKB from Padinska Skela, the suburb where he was born and raised. He then signed for Red Star aged thirteen, becoming a part of one of the most talented generations in the history of Red Star's youth academy.

=== Red Star Belgrade ===
Basta signed his first professional contract at the age of 17, when he together with a few teammates from Red Star's youth team broke into the senior squad. He made his professional debut on his 18th birthday (18 August 2002) in a 1–0 defeat from Sutjeska in Nikšić, Montenegro. In the following, his second season, he played on loan in Jedinstvo Ub (along with Aleksandar Luković and Boško Janković). Over the season Basta displayed great technique, and pass accuracy and soon became one of the most important players for Red Star Belgrade. In April 2005 Basta suffered an injury which kept him out of football for five months. By the end of his spell at Red Star, Basta won six trophies with Red Star Belgrade, including three domestic doubles.

=== Udinese ===
In July 2008 he moved from Red Star Belgrade to Udinese. He played in pre-season friendlies for Udinese. However, Udinese did not wish to allocate one of the two non-EU registration quota on Basta, and Basta moved to Lecce on loan from Red Star Belgrade, in order to borrow the quota from Lecce, like his teammate and countryman Aleksandar Luković.

After returning to Udinese in summer 2009, he became the starting right wing-back soon after the season started instead of his usual midfield position. He made his debut on 23 September 2009 against AC Milan, replacing Mauricio Isla after 27 minutes. Udinese won the match 1–0. After injuries to Simone Pepe, he played as a right-sided midfielder in their 3–5–2 formation for a few matches. Basta was later injured and missed the whole 2010–11 Serie A season, meaning that Mauricio Isla secured Basta's place in the team.

Basta made his return after 18 months on 11 September, the first gameweek of the 2011–12 Serie A season. In that match the coach Francesco Guidolin rested Isla, using Basta as the right wing-back in their 3–5–2 formation. He scored a goal, beating Lecce 2–0. In the next match, the first group stage match of the 2011–12 UEFA Europa League, Basta returned to the bench. On 6 November 2011, Basta scored the first goal in a 2–1 victory against Siena. On 11 December 2011, the Serb headed in Udinese's second goal in a 2–1 victory against Chievo. He then scored a powerful shot against struggling Cesena.

=== Lazio ===
Basta signed with Lazio on 23 June 2014 in a temporary deal, with an obligation to buy. Eventually Basta cost Lazio €10.5 million.

On 30 April 2017 Basta returned to score a goal in the Serie A, three years later the previous one (Udinese-Roma 2–3, 17 March 2014) and against the same opponent team: his goal allowed Lazio to win the Derby della Capitale against the city rivals of Roma (Lazio won the match 3–1 away and Basta scored the second goal).

== International career ==
Basta debuted for his country against Spain on 31 March 2005. He substituted Ognjen Koroman in 77 minutes. He collected his second cap in Tunisia. He was in Serbia and Montenegro team for World Cup in Germany, but he did not play.

For Serbia U21s selection he played 18 games and he played on two European Under-21 Football Championship, First time in Portugal 2006 he reached semi-final, second time he became losing finalists in the Netherlands 2007. He was called up by the caretaker of the Serbia national football team, Radovan Ćurčić, for two friendly matches, against Mexico and Honduras, as a replacement for the injured Neven Subotić. Shortly after being called up, he suffered an injury. Ćurčić called up Nemanja Tomić, Adem Ljajić and Andrija Kaluđerović instead.

In June 2018, Basta was left out from Serbia's 23-man squad for the 2018 FIFA World Cup in Russia. His final international was a March 2018 friendly match against Morocco.

== Career statistics ==
=== Club ===
As of 1 July 2019

Appearances and goals by club, season and competition
Club	Season	League		Cup		Europe		Other		Total	
Club	Season	Apps	Goals	Apps	Goals	Apps	Goals	Apps	Goals	Apps	Goals
Red Star Belgrade	2002–03	12	0	3	0	1	0	—		16	0
Red Star Belgrade	2003–04	1	0	1	0	0	0	—		2	0
Red Star Belgrade	2004–05	23	2	2	0	5	0	—		30	2
Red Star Belgrade	2005–06	25	0	3	2	6	1	—		34	3
Red Star Belgrade	2006–07	16	0	4	1	4	0	—		24	1
Red Star Belgrade	2007–08	20	1	1	0	9	1	—		30	2
Red Star Belgrade	Total	97	3	14	3	25	2	0	0	136	8
Jedinstvo Ub (loan)	2003–04	27	9			—		—		27	9
Lecce (loan)	2008–09	7	0	0	0	—		—		7	0
Udinese	2009–10	16	0	0	0	—		—		16	0
Udinese	2010–11	0	0	0	0	—		—		0	0
Udinese	2011–12	31	5	1	0	7	0	—		39	5
Udinese	2012–13	28	1	1	0	5	1	—		34	2
Udinese	2013–14	30	3	0	0	4	1	—		34	4
Udinese	Total	105	9	2	0	16	2	0	0	123	11
Lazio	2014–15	27	0	6	1	—		—		33	1
Lazio	2015–16	23	0	0	0	5	0	1	0	29	0
Lazio	2016–17	27	1	3	0	—		—		30	1
Lazio	2017–18	11	0	3	0	7	0	1	0	22	0
Lazio	2018–19	0	0	0	0	2	0	0	0	2	0
Lazio	Total	88	1	12	1	14	0	2	0	116	2
Career total		297	13	28	4	55	4	2	0	382	21

=== International ===
As of 13 December 2018

Appearances and goals by national team and year
National team	Year	Apps	Goals
Serbia and Montenegro	2005	1	0
Serbia and Montenegro	2006	1	0
Serbia	2007	0	0
Serbia	2008	0	0
Serbia	2009	0	0
Serbia	2010	0	0
Serbia	2011	0	0
Serbia	2012	3	0
Serbia	2013	7	2
Serbia	2014	4	0
Serbia	2015	1	0
Serbia	2016	0	0
Serbia	2017	0	0
Serbia	2018	1	0
Total		18	2

Scores and results list Serbia's goal tally first, score column indicates score after each Basta goal.

List of international goals scored by Dušan Basta
No.	Date	Venue	Opponent	Score	Result	Competition
1	6 February 2013	GSP Stadium, Nicosia, Cyprus	Cyprus	3–1	3–3	Friendly
2	15 October 2013	Jagodina City Stadium, Jagodina, Serbia	Macedonia	2–0	5–1	2014 FIFA World Cup qualification

== Honours ==
Red Star Belgrade

- Serbian SuperLiga: 2005–06, 2006–07
- Serbian Cup: 2005–06, 2006–07

Lazio

- Coppa Italia: 2018–19
- Supercoppa Italiana: 2017
