= 2006–07 Serbian Cup =

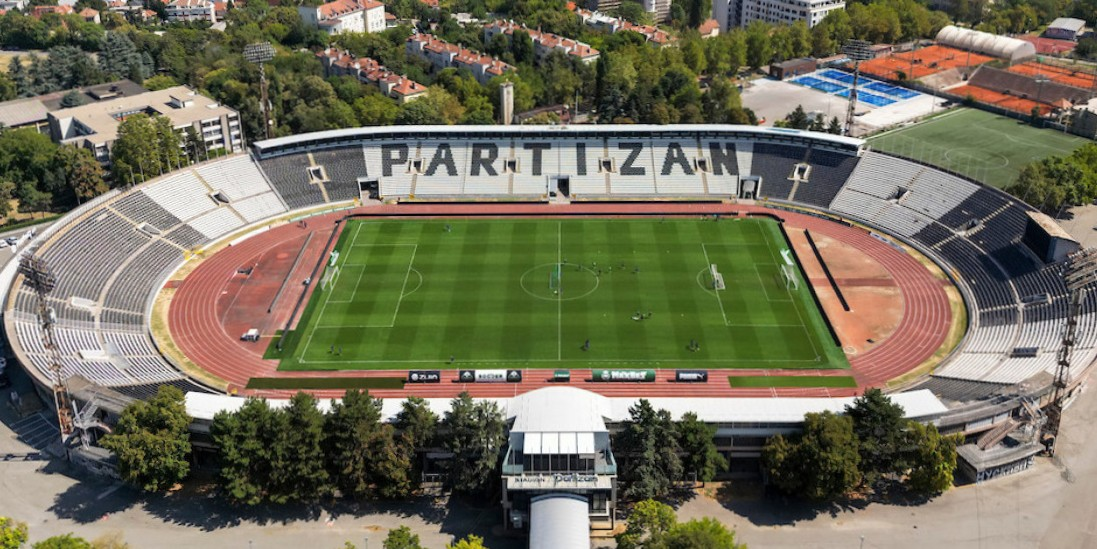
- Partizan Stadium host the final

Tournament details
- Country: Serbia
- Teams: 32

Final positions
- Champions: Red Star
- Runners-up: Vojvodina

Tournament statistics
- Matches played: 31
- Goals scored: 102 (3.29 per match)

The 2006–07 Serbian Cup season was the first staging of Serbia's football knockout competition. It was the first tournament that Serbia ever held as an independent football association. Montenegro also held its first independent cup tournament in the 2006–07 season. The predecessor competition was the Serbia and Montenegro Cup until that state dissolved. Heavy favorites Red Star defeated Vojvodina to win the tournament and become Serbia's first cup winner and later clinched the Meridian SuperLiga title to claim its tenth domestic double.

== Individual awards ==
Award	Recipient	Affiliation
Most Valuable Player	Nenad Milijaš	Red Star
Golden Boot	Žarko Lazetić	Bežanija / Partizan
Best Referee	Dejan Delević	Belgrade

== Round of 32 ==
Team 1	Score	Team 2
Red Star	3–0	Sevojno
Timok	0–1	Banat
Jedinstvo Putevi	1–3	Čukarički
Mladenovac	2–1	Smederevo
Obilić	0–3	Vlasina
Vojvodina	4–1	BASK
Mokra Gora	1–1 (p. 4–3)	Borac
Srem	1–0	Rad
Spartak	0–2	Mladost Apatin
Teleoptik	2–2 (p. 4–5)	Voždovac
Bežanija	4–0	Mačva
Napredak	3–0	Javor Habitfarm
Radnički Niš	3–0	Hajduk Kula
Big Bull	0–4	OFK Beograd
Partizan	3–0	ČSK
Zemun	3–5	Radnički Pirot

== Round of 16 ==
Team 1	Score	Team 2
Partizan	2–0	Srem
Mokra Gora	1–2	Red Star
Mladost Apatin	2–0	OFK Beograd
Mladenovac	0–1	Vojvodina
Vlasina	0–0 (p. 2–4)	Bežanija
Banat	1–1 (p. 8–7)	Napredak
Voždovac	1–2	Čukarički
Radnički Pirot	3–1	Radnički Niš

== Quarter-finals ==
Team 1	Score	Team 2
Radnički Pirot	1–2	Vojvodina
Banat	1–0	Bežanija
Čukarički	0–2	Red Star
Mladost Apatin	0–3	Partizan

== Semi-finals ==
18 April 2007
15:30 CEST

Vojvodina	1–0	Banat
Despotović 76' (pen.)	Report

Karađorđe Stadium, Novi Sad
Attendance: 6,000
Referee: Milan Karadžić

18 April 2007
18:30 CEST

Red Star	1–0	Partizan
Milijaš 15'	Report

Red Star Stadium, Belgrade
Attendance: 12,000
Referee: Mihajlo Jeknić

== Final ==
The final was held at Partizan's Stadium on May 15, 2007 in Belgrade, Serbia. The final pitted Serbian powerhouse Red Star against the up-and-coming side FK Vojvodina. Vojvodina jumped out to the brighter start, with great attacking play from midfielder Milan Davidov running the show and wing-back Nikola Petković causing problems down the left.

Striker Ranko Despotović came close in the 10th minute after a darting run by Petković. Luckily for Red Star, their veteran defender Dušan Basta foiled a flowing move with a last-gasp tackle after keeper Ivan Ranđelović was beaten.

Red Star responded with a Nenad Milijaš free kick that almost crept in and Milan Purović`s close-range header before Koroman broke the deadlock on the hour with a crisp shot from the edge of the penalty box.

Vojvodina were on the back foot in the second half and failed to muster a single shot on target as Davidov faded and talented Montenegrin playmaker Igor Burzanović ran their defence ragged at the other end. Dušan Đokić sealed the win with a delightful 85th-minute lob after a defence-splitting pass from Burzanović.

"We couldn't break them down in the first half but our lads responded well after the halftime chat in the dressing room and we dedicate this victory to our fans," said Red Star's delighted coach Boško Djurovski.

Koroman also praised the home section of the 25,000 crowd and said Red Star would now aim for success in Europe.

"Our fans were like an extra man on the pitch again and we want to treat them to some Champions League football next season."

15 May 2007
20:15 CEST

Red Star	2–0	Vojvodina
Koroman 63'; Đokić 85'

Partizan Stadium, Belgrade
Attendance: 25,000
Referee: Dejan Delević (Belgrade)

Home Club	Score	Visiting Club
Red Star	2 – 0	Vojvodina
Date	May 15, 2007	
Locale	Partizan Stadium, Belgrade, Serbia	
Attendance	25,000 (cap. 32,887)	
Referee	Dejan Delević (Belgrade)	
Red Star (coach: Boško Đurovski)	Randjelović, Basta, Gueye, Tutorić, Andjelković, Milovanović, Castillo, Milijaš, Rašković (56' Burzanović), Koroman (84' Joksimović), Purović (75' Đokić).	
Vojvodina (coach: Milovan Rajevac)	Kahriman, Stošić, Đurić, Pekarić, Petković, Kačar (75' Sikimić), Popović, Buač (65' Pantelić), Tadić (88' Smiljanić), Davidov, Despotović.	
Notes	Scorer: 1–0 Koroman 63', 2–0 Đokić 85'	
