= 2005–06 Serbia and Montenegro Cup =

Tournament details
- Country: Serbia and Montenegro
- Teams: 32

Final positions
- Champions: Red Star
- Runners-up: OFK Beograd

Tournament statistics
- Matches played: 31
- Goals scored: 59 (1.9 per match)

The 2005–06 Serbia and Montenegro Cup was the fourth and last season of the Serbia and Montenegro's annual football cup before the dissolution. The cup defenders should be Železnik, but the club was merged with Voždovac. Red Star Belgrade has last winner of the competition, after they defeated OFK Beograd. She later clinched the Meridian SuperLiga title to claim its 9th domestic double.

== First round ==
Thirty-two teams entered in the First Round. The matches were played on 20, 21, 27, 28 September and 19 October 2005.

Team 1	Score	Team 2
Mladost Podgorica (III)	2–0	Voždovac
Zemun	1–0	Budućnost Banatski Dvor
Partizan	2–0	Javor
Rad	2–1	Čukarički (II)
Mladost Apatin (II)	0–1	Obilić
PSK Pančevo (II)	0–1	Hajduk Kula
Vlasina (II)	1–0	Budućnost Podgorica
Mladost Lučani (III)	0–0 (6–7 p)	Smederevo
Crvena Stijena (III)	2–0	Vojvodina
Kolubara (III)	0–0 (3–2 p)	Borac Čačak
Sutjeska (II)	1–0	Mačva (II)
Hajduk Beograd (III)	0–0 (3–5 p)	Radnički Niš (II)
Timok (III)	2–0	Radnički Beograd (III)
Mokra Gora (IV)	0–3	OFK Beograd
Radnički Sombor (III)	1–0	Zeta
Takovo (III)	0–1	Red Star

Note: Roman numerals in brackets denote the league tier the clubs participated in the 2005–06 season.

== Second round ==
The 16 winners from the prior round enter this round. The matches were played on 26 October 2005.

Team 1	Score	Team 2
OFK Beograd	2–1	Obilić
Hajduk Kula	2–0	Sutjeska (II)
Radnički Niš (II)	0–0 (3–1 p)	Zemun
Vlasina (II)	2–0	Rad
Partizan	1–1 (4–5 p)	Timok (III)
Red Star	2–1	Mladost Podgorica (III)
Smederevo	4–0	Crvena Stijena (III)
Radnički Sombor (III)	0–1	Kolubara (III)

Note: Roman numerals in brackets denote the league tier the clubs participated in the 2005–06 season.

== Quarter-finals ==
The eight winners from the prior round enter this round. The matches were played on 7 December 2005.

Team 1	Score	Team 2
Red Star	2–0	Smederevo
OFK Beograd	1–0	Hajduk Kula
Radnički Niš (II)	2–0	Timok (III)
Kolubara (III)	0–0 (5–4 p)	Vlasina (III)

Note: Roman numerals in brackets denote the league tier the clubs participated in the 2005–06 season.

== Semi-finals ==
11 April 2006
16:30

Radnički Niš (II)	0–5	Red Star
		Suzuki 27', 80'; Basta 29'; Purović 33', 59'

Čair Stadium, Niš
Attendance: 10,000
Referee: Dejan Stanišić (Podgorica)
12 April 2006
16:30

OFK Beograd	4–1	Kolubara (III)
Baković 21'; M. Ranković 34' (o.g.); Simić 56'; Božović 83'		Pavlović 59'

Omladinski Stadium, Belgrade
Attendance: 1,000
Referee: Milenko Vukadinović (Belgrade)

Note: Roman numerals in brackets denote the league tier the clubs participated in the 2005–06 season.

== Final ==
10 May 2006
18:00

Red Star	4–2 (a.e.t.)	OFK Beograd
Žigić 66', 101'; Purović 73'; Basta 117'	Report	Rakić 10'; Biševac 59' (o.g.)

Partizan Stadium, Belgrade
Attendance: 10,757
Referee: Milenko Vukadinović (Belgrade)

== See also ==
- 2005–06 Serbia and Montenegro SuperLiga
