= List of FK Sloga Kraljevo managers =

FK Sloga Kraljevo is a professional football club based in Kraljevo, Serbia.

== Managers ==
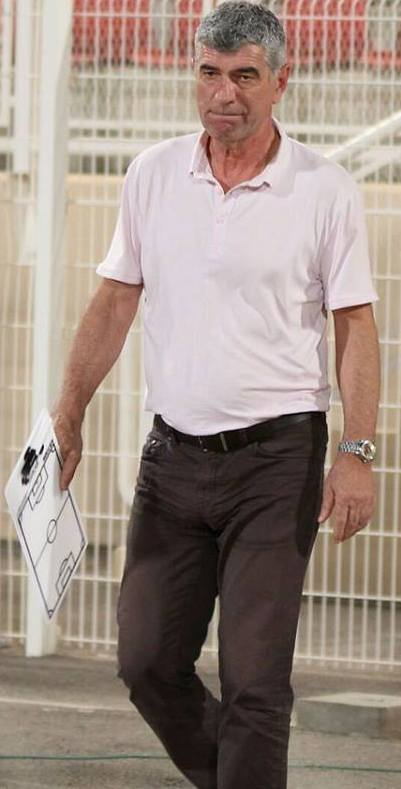
Branko Smiljanić

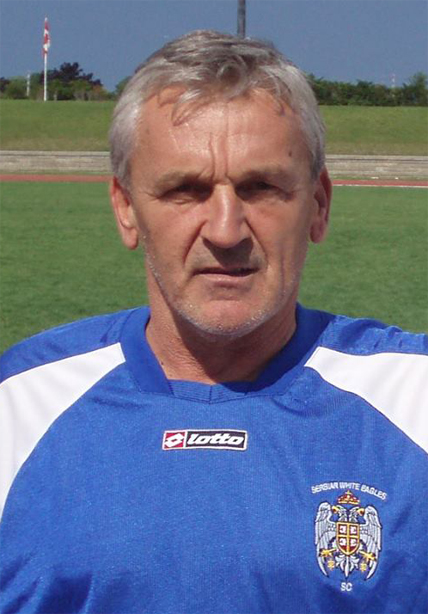
Milan Čančarević

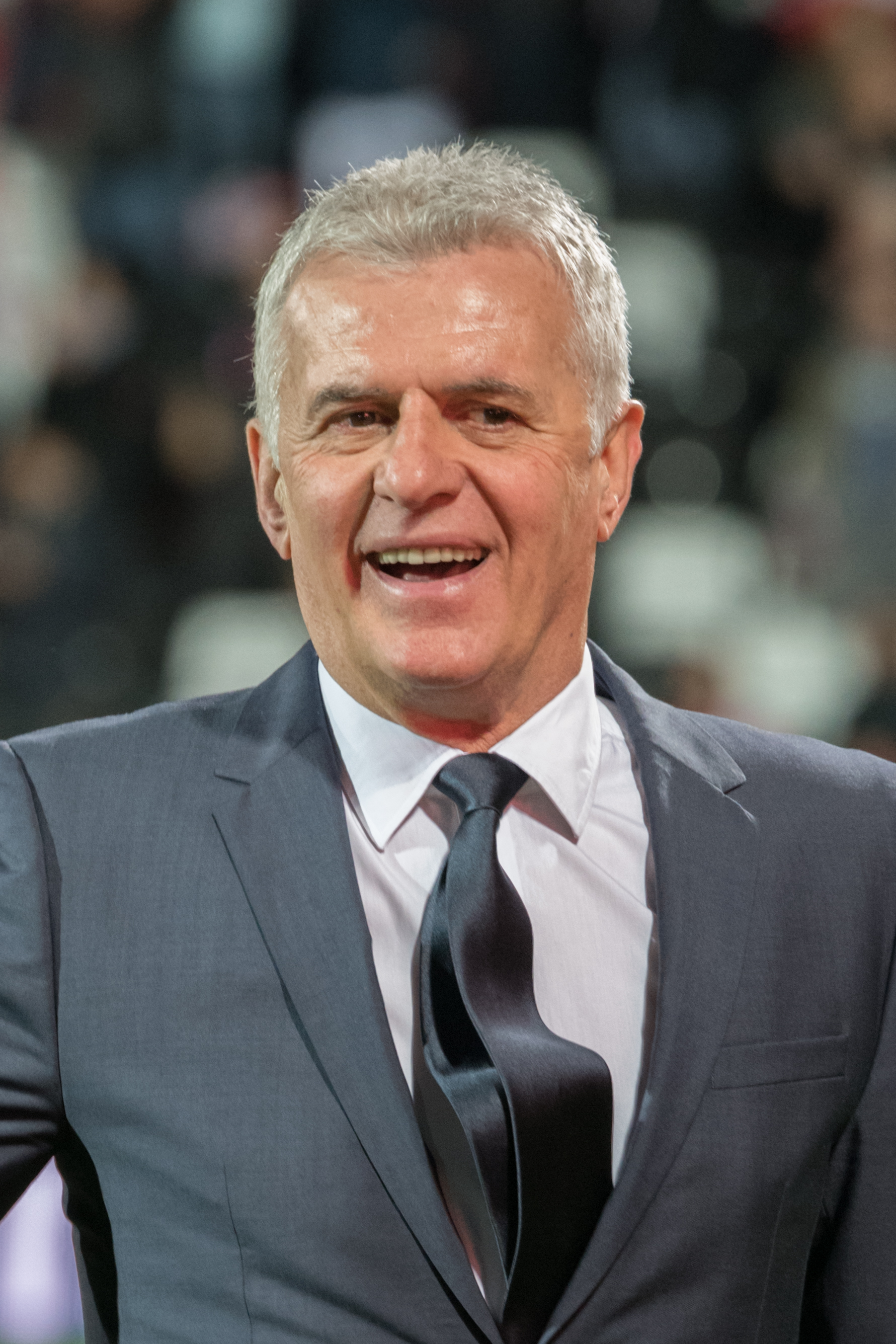
Miodrag Martać

Name	Period		Pld	W	D	L	Win %	Honours
Name	From	To	Pld	W	D	L	Win %	Honours
(Socialist Federal Republic of Yugoslavia) Branislav Hrnjiček	August 1959	1960						
(Socialist Federal Republic of Yugoslavia) Kosta Tomašević	May 1960	July 1961						
(Socialist Federal Republic of Yugoslavia) Prvoslav Dragićević	July 1961	December 1961						
(Socialist Federal Republic of Yugoslavia) Kosta Tomašević	January 1962	1962						
(Socialist Federal Republic of Yugoslavia) Branislav Hrnjiček	1962	1962						
(Socialist Federal Republic of Yugoslavia) Miroslav Anđelković	1963	1965						
(Socialist Federal Republic of Yugoslavia) Aleksandar Petaković	October 1965	June 1967						
(Socialist Federal Republic of Yugoslavia) Dragutin Spasojević	July 1967	July 1970						1969–70 Yugoslav Second League (Group East)
(Socialist Federal Republic of Yugoslavia) Boris Marović	August 1970	December 1970						
(Socialist Federal Republic of Yugoslavia) Zoran Milošević	December 1970	December 1972						
(Socialist Federal Republic of Yugoslavia) Simo Vilić	February 1973	April 1973						
(Socialist Federal Republic of Yugoslavia) Bogdan Pantelić	April 1973	July 1973						
(Socialist Federal Republic of Yugoslavia) Aleksandar Petaković	August 1973	April 1974						
(Socialist Federal Republic of Yugoslavia) Žarko Nikolić	April 1974	November 1974						
(Socialist Federal Republic of Yugoslavia) Aleksandar Petaković	November 1974	1974						
(Socialist Federal Republic of Yugoslavia) Aleksandar Vukotić	January 1975	June 1975						
(Socialist Federal Republic of Yugoslavia) Milutin Jakić	July 1975	January 1976						
(Socialist Federal Republic of Yugoslavia) Božidar Pajević	January 1976	May 1976						
(Socialist Federal Republic of Yugoslavia) Dragoslav Lazarević	1976	1976						
(Socialist Federal Republic of Yugoslavia) Miljan Zeković	August 1976	December 1976						
(Socialist Federal Republic of Yugoslavia) Braco Vidosavljević	January 1977	June 1977						
(Socialist Federal Republic of Yugoslavia) Bogdan Pantelić	June 1977	1977						
(Socialist Federal Republic of Yugoslavia) Predrag Milović	August 1977	April 1978						
(Socialist Federal Republic of Yugoslavia) Aleksandar Petaković	July 1978	June 1980						
(Socialist Federal Republic of Yugoslavia) Abdulah Gegić	July 1980	June 1981						
(Socialist Federal Republic of Yugoslavia) Srećko Petković	July 1981	June 1982						
(Socialist Federal Republic of Yugoslavia) Bogdan Pantelić	July 1982	November 1982						
(Socialist Federal Republic of Yugoslavia) Srećko Petković	1982	June 1983						
(Socialist Federal Republic of Yugoslavia) Bogdan Pantelić	June 1983	September 1985						
(Socialist Federal Republic of Yugoslavia) Dragoljub Veljković	September 1985	June 1986						
(Socialist Federal Republic of Yugoslavia) Ratomir Mitić	June 1986	1987						
(Socialist Federal Republic of Yugoslavia) Đorđe Koković	July 1987	October 1987						
(Socialist Federal Republic of Yugoslavia) Milonja Kaličanin	December 1987	September 1988						
(Socialist Federal Republic of Yugoslavia) Branko Vukićević	September 1988	December 1988						
(Socialist Federal Republic of Yugoslavia) Đorđe Koković	December 1988	April 1990						
(Socialist Federal Republic of Yugoslavia) Milutin Jakić	April 1990	December 1990						
(Socialist Federal Republic of Yugoslavia) Boris Bunjak	December 1990	September 1991						
(Federal Republic of Yugoslavia) Milonja Kaličanin	September 1991	February 1993						
(Federal Republic of Yugoslavia) Zoran Čolaković	February 1993	June 1993						
(Federal Republic of Yugoslavia) Boris Bunjak	June 1993	June 1993						
(Federal Republic of Yugoslavia) Novak Jovanović (caretaker)	June 1993	July 1993						
(Federal Republic of Yugoslavia) Uroš Popov	July 1993	August 1993						
(Federal Republic of Yugoslavia) Branko Vukićević	August 1993	September 1995						
(Federal Republic of Yugoslavia) Milovan Ćirković	September 1995	November 1995						
(Federal Republic of Yugoslavia) Dragan Jovanović	November 1995	1996						
(Federal Republic of Yugoslavia) Živojin Ilić	July 1996	June 1997						
(Federal Republic of Yugoslavia) Branko Smiljanić	July 1997	February 1998						
(Bosnia and Herzegovina) Vladimir Pecelj	February 1998	May 1998						
(Federal Republic of Yugoslavia) Milonja Kaličanin	June 1998	August 1998						
(Federal Republic of Yugoslavia) Radmilo Jovanović	October 1998	August 1999						
(Federal Republic of Yugoslavia) Ljubiša Milojević	August 1999	November 2000						
(Federal Republic of Yugoslavia) Milan Čančarević	November 2000	April 2001						
(Federal Republic of Yugoslavia) Branko Vukićević	April 2001	November 2001						
(Federal Republic of Yugoslavia) Željko Milićević	November 2001	May 2002						
(Federal Republic of Yugoslavia) Dragan Savićević	May 2002	September 2002						
(Serbia and Montenegro) Milan Marić (caretaker)	September 2002	October 2002						
(Serbia and Montenegro) Živojin Ilić	October 2002	2003						
(Serbia and Montenegro) Mile Vuletić	January 2004	April 2005						
(Serbia and Montenegro) Ljubiša Milojević	April 2005	2005						
(Serbia and Montenegro) Slobodan Stašević	July 2005	2006						
(Serbia) Goran Dragićević	June 2006	2007						
(Serbia) Đorđe Koković	July 2007	September 2007						
(Serbia) Goran Dragićević	September 2007	January 2008						
(Serbia) Nebojša Vučićević	January 2008	April 2008						
(Serbia) Igor Tufegdžić	April 2008	March 2009						
(Serbia) Milutin Marušić (caretaker)	March 2009	April 2009						
(North Macedonia) Ivica Cvetanovski	April 2009	September 2009						2008–09 Serbian League West
(Serbia) Saša Nikolić	September 2009	December 2009						
(Serbia) Milutin Marušić	December 2009	April 2010						
(Serbia) Igor Tufegdžić	April 2010	July 2011						2010–11 Serbian League West
(Serbia) Dragan Jovanović	July 2011	April 2012						
(Serbia) Ivan Karalić	April 2012	June 2012						
(Serbia) Igor Tufegdžić	July 2012	August 2012						
(Serbia) Miodrag Martać	August 2012	September 2012						
(Serbia) Mile Vuletić (caretaker)	September 2012	September 2012						
(Serbia) Saša Mrkić	September 2012	November 2012						
(Serbia) Igor Tufegdžić	November 2012	December 2012						
(Serbia) Neško Milovanović	January 2013	June 2013						
(Bosnia and Herzegovina) Veljko Dovedan	June 2013	April 2014						
(Serbia) Igor Tufegdžić	April 2014	May 2014						
(Serbia) Miljojko Gošić	July 2014	September 2014						
(Bosnia and Herzegovina) Veljko Dovedan	September 2014	May 2015						
(Serbia) Igor Tufegdžić	July 2015	October 2015						
(Serbia) Petar Đekić	October 2015	December 2015						
(Serbia) Dragan Jovanović	December 2015	June 2016						
(Serbia) Dejan Đilas	August 2016	October 2016						
(Serbia) Vladislav Stojanović	October 2016	June 2017						
(Serbia) Igor Tufegdžić	June 2017	May 2018						
(Serbia) Branislav Đurić	May 2018	June 2018						
(Serbia) Goran Tasić	July 2018	June 2019						
(Serbia) Petar Divić	June 2019	September 2020						
(Serbia) Boris Bunjak	September 2020	January 2021						
(Serbia) Darko Milisavljević	January 2021	April 2021						
(Serbia) Miljan Đurović	April 2021	September 2021						
(Serbia) Neško Milovanović	September 2021	2021						
(Serbia) Dušan Đokić	February 2022	April 2022						
(Serbia) Žarko Jovanović	April 2022	2022						
(Serbia) Miodrag Anđelković	July 2022	August 2022						
(Serbia) Uroš Kalinić	August 2022	October 2022						
(Serbia) Dejan Srdić	October 2022	April 2023						
(Serbia) Miljan Đurović	April 2023	2023						
(Serbia) Aleksandar Trišović	July 2023	September 2024						
(Serbia) Slaviša Kovačević	September 2024	2025						
(Serbia) Zoran Vujičić	February 2025	2025						
(Serbia) Slaviša Kovačević	April 2025	2025						
