= 1956–57 Yugoslav Cup =

1957 Yugoslav Football Cup
10th Marshal Tito Cup

Tournament details
- Country: Yugoslavia
- Dates: 27 March – 26 May
- Teams: 16

Final positions
- Champions: Partizan (4th title)
- Runners-up: Radnički Beograd

Tournament statistics
- Matches played: 15
- Goals scored: 67 (4.47 per match)
- Goals scored in penalty shoot-outs not included.

The 1956–57 Yugoslav Cup was the 10th season of the top football knockout competition in SFR Yugoslavia, the Yugoslav Cup (Serbo-Croatian: Kup Jugoslavije), also known as the "Marshal Tito Cup" (Kup Maršala Tita), since its establishment in 1946.

== Round of 16 ==
In the following tables winning teams are marked in bold; teams from outside top level are marked in italic script.

Tie no	Home team	Score	Away team
1	**Budućnost Titograd**	4–2	Odred Ljubljana
2	**Partizan**	3–1	Dinamo Zagreb
3	**Proleter Osijek**	1–0	BSK Belgrade
4	**Red Star**	3–0	Lokomotiva
5	**Spartak Subotica**	4–3	Zenica
6	**Šibenik**	4–0	Nafta Bosanski Brod
7	Velež	0–1	**Radnički Belgrade**
8	**Vojvodina**	4–0	Rabotnički

== Quarter-finals ==
Tie no	Home team	Score	Away team
1	**Budućnost Titograd**	2–0 (a.e.t.)	Vojvodina
2	**Partizan**	4–2	Red Star
3	**Radnički Belgrade**	4–2	Spartak Subotica
4	**Šibenik**	3–1	Proleter Osijek

== Semi-finals ==
Tie no	Home team	Score	Away team
1	**Partizan**	7–0	Šibenik
2	**Radnički Belgrade**	3–1	Budućnost Titograd

== Final ==
26 May 1957

Partizan	5 – 3	Radnički Belgrade
Valok 47'; Mesaroš 59'; Kaloperović 65' (pen.); Milutinović 67'; Zebec 76'		Belin 5' (o.g.); Petaković 9'; Prljinčević 25'

Stadion JNA, Belgrade
Attendance: 12,000
Referee: Borče Nedelkovski (Skopje)

PARTIZAN:
GK	(Socialist Federal Republic of Yugoslavia) Slavko Stojanović
	(Socialist Federal Republic of Yugoslavia) Bruno Belin
	(Socialist Federal Republic of Yugoslavia) Antun Herceg
	(Socialist Federal Republic of Yugoslavia) Tomislav Kaloperović
	(Socialist Federal Republic of Yugoslavia) Milorad Milutinović
	(Socialist Federal Republic of Yugoslavia) Božidar Pajević
	(Socialist Federal Republic of Yugoslavia) Mihalj Mesaroš
	(Socialist Federal Republic of Yugoslavia) Miloš Milutinović
	(Socialist Federal Republic of Yugoslavia) Marko Valok
	(Socialist Federal Republic of Yugoslavia) Stjepan Bobek
	(Socialist Federal Republic of Yugoslavia) Branko Zebec
Manager:
(Socialist Federal Republic of Yugoslavia) Florijan Matekalo

RADNIČKI BELGRADE:
GK	(Socialist Federal Republic of Yugoslavia) Blagoje Vidinić
	(Socialist Federal Republic of Yugoslavia) Đura Čokić
	(Socialist Federal Republic of Yugoslavia) Vladimir Odanović
	(Socialist Federal Republic of Yugoslavia) Milan Ljubenović
	(Socialist Federal Republic of Yugoslavia) Milorad Diskić
	(Socialist Federal Republic of Yugoslavia) Radmilo Ristić
	(Socialist Federal Republic of Yugoslavia) Aleksandar Petaković
	(Socialist Federal Republic of Yugoslavia) Radivoje Ognjanović
	(Socialist Federal Republic of Yugoslavia) Tihomir Marković
	(Socialist Federal Republic of Yugoslavia) Zoran Prljinčević
	(Socialist Federal Republic of Yugoslavia) Ljubomir Ognjanović
Manager:
(Hungary) Illés Spitz

== See also ==
- 1956–57 Yugoslav First League
