= Goran Milošević =

Serbian footballer

Personal information
- Full name: Goran Milošević
- Date of birth: 9 July 1972 (age 54)
- Place of birth: Zemun, SFR Yugoslavia
- Height: 1.82 m (6 ft 0 in)
- Position: Centre-back

Senior career*
Years	Team	Apps	(Gls)
1991–1996	Zemun	81	(16)
1996–1997	Vojvodina	15	(2)
1997–1999	Espanyol	15	(0)
1998	→ Lleida (loan)	6	(0)
1999–2000	Lleida	25	(1)
2000–2002	Jaén	54	(3)
2002–2004	Zemun	30	(2)
2004	Bežanija	15	(2)
2005	Železnik	9	(1)
2005–2006	Voždovac	27	(2)
2006	Bežanija	14	(1)
Total		291	(30)

Managerial career
- 2014: Žarkovo
- * Club domestic league appearances and goals

Goran Milošević (Serbian Cyrillic: Горан Милошевић; born 9 July 1972) is a Serbian retired footballer who played as a centre-back.

== Honours ==
Železnik

- Serbia and Montenegro Cup: 2004–05
