= 1956–57 Red Star Belgrade season =

Red Star Belgrade
1956–57 season
- Chairman: Dragoje Đurić (until 18 September); Dušan Blagojević (from 24 September)
- Manager: Milovan Ćirić
- Yugoslav First League: 1st
- Yugoslav Cup: Quarter-finals
- Mitropa Cup: Quarter-finals
- European Cup: Semi-finals
- Top goalscorer: League: Bora Kostić (27); All: Bora Kostić (36)

During the 1956–57 season, Red Star Belgrade participated in the 1956–57 Yugoslav First League, 1956–57 Yugoslav Cup, 1956 Mitropa Cup and 1956–57 European Cup.

== Season summary ==
Red Star participated in the European Cup for the first time and were eliminated by Fiorentina in the semi-finals.

== Squad ==
Name	Yugoslav First League		Yugoslav Cup		Mitropa Cup		European Cup		Total	
Name	Apps	Goals	Apps	Goals	Apps	Goals	Apps	Goals	Apps	Goals
Goalkeepers
(Socialist Federal Republic of Yugoslavia) Vladimir Beara	17	0	1	0	2	0	5	0	25	0
(Socialist Federal Republic of Yugoslavia) Srboljub Krivokuća	9	0	2	0	0	0	1	0	12	0
Defenders
(Socialist Federal Republic of Yugoslavia) Ljubiša Spajić	23	0	2	0	2	0	6	0	33	0
(Socialist Federal Republic of Yugoslavia) Miljan Zeković	22	0	2	0	2	0	6	0	32	0
(Socialist Federal Republic of Yugoslavia) Branko Stanković	18	0	2	1	2	0	4	0	26	1
(Socialist Federal Republic of Yugoslavia) Branko Nešović	6	0	1	0	0	0	0	0	7	0
(Socialist Federal Republic of Yugoslavia) Novak Tomić	5	0	1	0	0	0	1	0	7	0
(Socialist Federal Republic of Yugoslavia) Vladimir Durković	6	1	0	0	0	0	0	0	6	1
Midfielders
(Socialist Federal Republic of Yugoslavia) Lazar Tasić	25	2	3	0	2	0	6	1	36	3
(Socialist Federal Republic of Yugoslavia) Dragoslav Šekularac	23	4	3	1	2	0	6	0	34	5
(Socialist Federal Republic of Yugoslavia) Vladica Popović	25	1	3	0	1	0	5	1	34	2
(Socialist Federal Republic of Yugoslavia) Rajko Mitić	21	4	2	0	2	0	6	0	31	4
(Socialist Federal Republic of Yugoslavia) Jovan Cokić	6	2	2	2	0	0	2	0	10	4
(Socialist Federal Republic of Yugoslavia) Stevan Veselinov	4	0	1	0	1	0	0	0	6	0
(Socialist Federal Republic of Yugoslavia) Nikola Stipić	1	0	0	0	0	0	0	0	1	0
(Socialist Federal Republic of Yugoslavia) Momčilo Ilić	1	0	0	0	0	0	0	0	1	0
Forwards
(Socialist Federal Republic of Yugoslavia) Bora Kostić	24	27	3	1	2	3	6	5	35	36
(Socialist Federal Republic of Yugoslavia) Antun Rudinski	24	12	3	2	2	0	6	1	35	15
(Socialist Federal Republic of Yugoslavia) Ivan Toplak	12	6	1	1	2	1	5	2	20	10
(Socialist Federal Republic of Yugoslavia) Ivan Popović	12	7	0	0	0	0	0	0	12	7
(Socialist Federal Republic of Yugoslavia) Predrag Marković	2	0	2	0	0	0	1	0	5	0

== Results ==
=== Yugoslav First League ===
Pos	Team	Pld	W	D	L	GF	GA	GR	Pts	Qualification or relegation
1	Red Star Belgrade (C)	26	17	5	4	66	23	2.870	39	Qualification for European Cup preliminary round
2	Vojvodina	26	16	3	7	64	38	1.684	35	
3	Hajduk Split	26	12	6	8	45	31	1.452	30	
4	Partizan	26	10	6	10	51	45	1.133	26	
5	Dinamo Zagreb	26	10	6	10	51	51	1.000	26	

Source: rsssf.org
Rules for classification: 1st points; 2nd goal average
(C) Champions

Date	Opponent	Venue	Result	Scorers
5 August 1956	Radnički Beograd	H	3–1	Kostić, Toplak, V. Popović
12 August 1956	Lokomotiva	A	0–1	
19 August 1956	Sarajevo	H	2–0	Kostić, Šekularac
22 August 1956	Spartak Subotica	H	1–0	I. Popović
26 August 1956	Zagreb	A	7–2	Kostić (6), I. Popović
2 September 1956	Vojvodina	H	4–0	I. Popović, Tasić (pen.), Rudinski, Kostić
23 September 1956	BSK Beograd	A	4–1	Kostić (2), Rudinski, Šekularac
6 October 1956	Hajduk Split	H	3–0	Kostić, Rudinski, Mitić
10 October 1956	Velež	A	2–0	Kostić, Rudinski
14 October 1956	Partizan	H	2–0	Tasić (pen.), Rudinski
17 October 1956	Budućnost	A	2–2	I. Popović, Rudinski
21 October 1956	Dinamo Zagreb	H	1–0	Toplak
28 October 1956	Vardar	A	2–0	I. Popović, Toplak
3 March 1957	Radnički Beograd	A	1–1	Toplak
10 March 1957	Lokomotiva	H	0–1	
20 March 1957	Sarajevo	A	4–0	Toplak (2), Kostić, Rudinski
24 March 1957	Spartak Subotica	A	1–1	Kostić
31 March 1957	Zagreb	H	6–0	Rudinski (3), Kostić (2), Cokić
7 April 1957	Vojvodina	A	2–1	Rudinski, I. Popović
14 April 1957	BSK Beograd	H	2–0	Kostić (2)
21 April 1957	Hajduk Split	A	2–2	Cokić, Šekularac
29 May 1957	Velež	H	6–1	Durković, Kostić (2), Mitić (2), Šekularac
2 June 1957	Partizan	A	0–1	
6 June 1957	Dinamo Zagreb	A	2–3	Kostić, Mitić
9 June 1957	Budućnost	H	5–3	Rudinski, I. Popović, Kostić (3)
23 June 1957	Vardar	H	2–2	Kostić (2)

=== Yugoslav Cup ===
Date	Opponent	Venue	Result	Scorers
15 August 1956	Borac Čačak	A	3–1	Stanković, Šekularac, Rudinski
27 March 1957	Lokomotiva	H	3–0	Rudinski (pen.), Toplak, Kostić
10 April 1957	Partizan	A	2–4	Cokić (2)

=== Mitropa Cup ===
Date	Opponent	Venue	Result	Scorers
24 June 1956	Vörös Lobogó	H	1–1	Kostić
1 July 1956	Vörös Lobogó	A	3–5	Toplak, Kostić (2)

=== European Cup ===
==== First round ====
3 November 1956	Rapid JC (Netherlands)	3–4	(Socialist Federal Republic of Yugoslavia) Red Star Belgrade	Sportpark Kaalheide, Kerkrade
	Janssen 8'; Bisschops 78'; Tasić 81' (o.g.)	Report	Kostić 4', 75'; Toplak 42'; Rudinski 82'	Attendance: 11,500; Referee: Albert Alsteen (Belgium)

8 November 1956	Red Star Belgrade (Socialist Federal Republic of Yugoslavia)	2–0	(Netherlands) Rapid JC	JNA Stadium, Belgrade
	Toplak 32'; Kostić 84'	Report		Attendance: 15,000; Referee: Rudolf Roman (Austria)

==== Quarter-finals ====
17 February 1957	Red Star Belgrade (Socialist Federal Republic of Yugoslavia)	3–1	(Bulgaria) CDNA Sofia	Avala Stadium, Belgrade
	Kostić 6', 25'; Popović 53'	Report	Yanev 88'	Attendance: 33,000; Referee: Riccardo Pieri (Italy)

24 February 1957	CDNA Sofia (Bulgaria)	2–1	(Socialist Federal Republic of Yugoslavia) Red Star Belgrade	Vasil Levski National Stadium, Sofia
	Bozhkov 22' (pen.); Panayotov 39'	Report	Tasić 29' (pen.)	Attendance: 50,000; Referee: Nikolay Latyshev (Soviet Union)

==== Semi-finals ====
3 April 1957	Red Star Belgrade (Socialist Federal Republic of Yugoslavia)	0–1	(Italy) Fiorentina	JNA Stadium, Belgrade
		Report	Prini 88'	Attendance: 40,000; Referee: Albert Alsteen (Belgium)

18 April 1957	Fiorentina (Italy)	0–0	(Socialist Federal Republic of Yugoslavia) Red Star Belgrade	Stadio Comunale, Florence
		Report		Attendance: 70,000; Referee: Klaas Schipper (Netherlands)

== See also ==
- List of Red Star Belgrade seasons
