= Jovan Markoski =

Serbian footballer

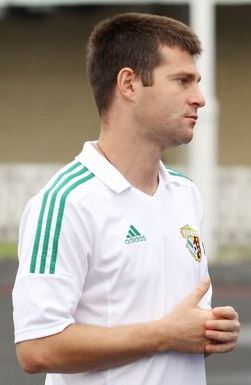
- Markoski with Vorskla Poltava in 2013

Personal information
- Full name: Jovan Markoski
- Date of birth: 23 June 1980 (age 46)
- Place of birth: Belgrade, SR Serbia, SFR Yugoslavia
- Height: 1.75 m (5 ft 9 in)
- Position: Midfielder

Senior career*
Years	Team	Apps	(Gls)
1997–1998	Radnički Obrenovac		
1999–2000	Mladost Lučani		
2000–2001	Red Star Belgrade	5	(0)
2001–2002	Mladost Lučani	25	(1)
2002–2005	Železnik	82	(6)
2005–2006	Zeta	25	(3)
2006–2015	Vorskla Poltava	226	(19)
2015–2018	Napredak Kruševac	69	(3)
2018–2019	Mladost Lučani	16	(0)
2019–2020	Napredak Kruševac	19	(0)
2020–2022	Radnički Obrenovac		
Total		467	(32)

International career
2001	FR Yugoslavia U21 (Note: Official UEFA matches only)	3	(0)
2003–2004	Serbia and Montenegro	4	(0)

Managerial career
- 2023-2024: Radnički Obrenovac
- 2025–: Hirnyk-Sport Horishni Plavni
- * Club domestic league appearances and goals as of 30 October 2025

Jovan Markoski (Serbian Cyrillic: Јован Маркоски; born 23 June 1980) is a Serbian former professional footballer who played as a midfielder. Since July 2025, he has been the head coach of the Ukrainian third-tier club, FC Hirnyk-Sport Horishni Plavni.

At international level, Markoski was capped four times for Serbia and Montenegro between 2003 and 2004.

== Club career ==
Markoski made a name for himself while playing for Železnik, winning the Serbia and Montenegro Cup in 2005. He subsequently spent one year at Zeta, before moving abroad to Ukrainian side Vorskla Poltava in the summer of 2006. He remained at the club for the next nine seasons, making over 200 appearances in the Ukrainian Premier League.

In June 2015, Markoski returned to his homeland, signing a one-year contract with Napredak Kruševac. He helped them win the Serbian First League in the 2015–16 season, thus earning promotion to the Serbian SuperLiga. After featuring in the team's first two matches of the 2018–19 season, Markoski terminated his contract with the club by mutual consent.

In August 2018, Markoski signed with his former club Mladost Lučani, rejoining them after 16 years. He moved back to Napredak Kruševac for the 2019–20 season. In October 2020, Markoski returned to his parent club Radnički Obrenovac.

== Managerial career ==
Since July 1, 2025, Markoski has been the head coach of Hirnyk-Sport Horishni Plavni.

== International career ==
Markoski made his full international debut for Serbia and Montenegro in a 1–0 friendly loss away against Germany on 30 April 2003. He was also a member of the team at the Kirin Cup in July 2004.

== Career statistics ==
=== Club ===
Appearances and goals by club, season and competition
Club	Season	League			Cup		Continental		Total	
Club	Season	Division	Apps	Goals	Apps	Goals	Apps	Goals	Apps	Goals
Mladost Lučani	1999–2000	Second League of FR Yugoslavia			—		—			
Red Star Belgrade	2000–01	First League of FR Yugoslavia	5	0	1	0	2	0	8	0
Mladost Lučani	2001–02	First League of FR Yugoslavia	25	1			—		25	1
Železnik	2002–03	First League of Serbia and Montenegro	30	4			—		30	4
Železnik	2003–04	First League of Serbia and Montenegro	27	0			—		27	0
Železnik	2004–05	First League of Serbia and Montenegro	25	2			2	0	27	2
Železnik	Total		82	6			2	0	84	6
Zeta	2005–06	Serbia and Montenegro SuperLiga	25	3			2	0	27	3
Vorskla Poltava	2006–07	Ukrainian Top League	26	1	1	0	—		27	1
Vorskla Poltava	2007–08	Ukrainian Top League	26	2	3	0	—		29	2
Vorskla Poltava	2008–09	Ukrainian Premier League	28	6	6	0	—		34	6
Vorskla Poltava	2009–10	Ukrainian Premier League	30	7	1	0	2	0	33	7
Vorskla Poltava	2010–11	Ukrainian Premier League	29	2	1	0	—		30	2
Vorskla Poltava	2011–12	Ukrainian Premier League	25	1	0	0	10	0	35	1
Vorskla Poltava	2012–13	Ukrainian Premier League	26	0	1	0	—		27	0
Vorskla Poltava	2013–14	Ukrainian Premier League	22	0	2	0	—		24	0
Vorskla Poltava	2014–15	Ukrainian Premier League	14	0	3	0	—		17	0
Vorskla Poltava	Total		226	19	18	0	12	0	256	19
Napredak Kruševac	2015–16	Serbian First League	24	2	1	0	—		25	2
Napredak Kruševac	2016–17	Serbian SuperLiga	25	0	0	0	—		25	0
Napredak Kruševac	2017–18	Serbian SuperLiga	18	1	1	0	—		19	1
Napredak Kruševac	2018–19	Serbian SuperLiga	2	0	0	0	—		2	0
Napredak Kruševac	Total		69	3	2	0	—		71	3
Mladost Lučani	2018–19	Serbian SuperLiga	16	0	3	0	—		19	0
Napredak Kruševac	2019–20	Serbian First League	15	0	1	0	—		16	0
Napredak Kruševac	2020–21	Serbian SuperLiga	4	0	0	0	—		4	0
Napredak Kruševac	Total		19	0	1	0	—		20	0
Career total			467	32	25	0	18	0	510	32

=== International ===
Appearances and goals by national team and year
National team	Year	Apps	Goals
Serbia and Montenegro	2003	1	0
Serbia and Montenegro	2004	3	0
Total		4	0

== Honours ==
Železnik

- Serbia and Montenegro Cup: 2004–05

Napredak Kruševac

- Serbian First League: 2015–16
