= Oliver Kovačević =

Serbian footballer (born 1974)

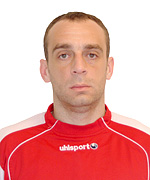

Personal information
- Full name: Oliver Kovačević
- Date of birth: 29 October 1974 (age 52)
- Place of birth: Split, SR Croatia, SFR Yugoslavia
- Height: 1.86 m (6 ft 1 in)
- Position: Goalkeeper

Youth career
- Hajduk Split

Senior career*
Years	Team	Apps	(Gls)
1994–1996	Lasta Sremčica		
1996–2001	Milicionar	63	(0)
2001–2005	Železnik	117	(0)
2005	Samsunspor	0	(0)
2006–2007	CSKA Sofia	9	(0)
Total		189	(0)

International career
2005	Serbia and Montenegro	3	(0)
- * Club domestic league appearances and goals

Oliver Kovačević (Serbian Cyrillic: Оливер Ковачевић; born 29 October 1974) is a Serbian former professional footballer who played as a goalkeeper.

Since his retirement, Kovačević has worked as a goalkeeping coach for Serbia's OFK Beograd, Rad and Čukarički, but also for Slovenia's Koper.

== Club career ==
After playing for Milicionar, Kovačević made a name for himself at Železnik. He collected over 100 league appearances for the club between 2001 and 2005. Kovačević also captained the team that won 2004–05 Serbia and Montenegro Cup. He subsequently moved abroad and signed with Turkish club Samsunspor. Before ending his active career, Kovačević spent one and a half years at Bulgarian side CSKA Sofia.

== International career ==
In 2005, Kovačević was capped for Serbia and Montenegro under Ilija Petković on three occasions. He was also a member of the team at the 2006 FIFA World Cup, but failed to make any appearances.

== Honours ==
Železnik

- Serbia and Montenegro Cup: 2004–05

CSKA Sofia

- Bulgarian Cup: 2005–06
