= Miroljub Pešić =

Serbian footballer

Personal information
- Full name: Miroljub Pešić
- Date of birth: 23 October 1993 (age 33)
- Place of birth: Belgrade, FR Yugoslavia
- Height: 1.91 m (6 ft 3 in)
- Position: Centre-back

Team information
- Current team: Sloven Ruma

Youth career
- OFK Beograd

Senior career*
Years	Team	Apps	(Gls)
2012–2013	Železnik	10	(0)
2013	→ Rad (loan)	1	(0)
2013–	Rad	0	(0)
2014	→ Železnik (loan)	11	(0)
2014–2015	→ Sinđelić Beograd (loan)	20	(2)
2015–2020	Sinđelić Beograd	79	(4)
2020–2022	Mačva Šabac	61	(3)
2023–2024	Radnički Beograd	37	(3)
2024–	Sloven Ruma	11	(0)
- * Club domestic league appearances and goals as of 26 March 2025

Miroljub Pešić (Serbian Cyrillic: Мирољуб Пешић; born 23 October 1993 in Belgrade) is a Serbian footballer who plays as a centre back for Sloven Ruma.
