= Branislav Novaković =

Serbian football manager and player

Personal information
- Date of birth: 14 December 1958 (age 67)
- Place of birth: Novi Kneževac, PR Serbia, FPR Yugoslavia
- Position: Midfielder

Youth career
- Obilić Novi Kneževac
- Vojvodina

Senior career*
| Years | Team | Apps | (Gls) |
| 1977–1986 | Vojvodina | 153 | (29) |
| 1979 | → Spartak Subotica (loan) | 25 | (9) |
| 1986 | Spartak Subotica | 8 | (0) |
| 1987–1989 | Vrbas | 23 | (2) |
| Total | | 209 | (40) |

Managerial career
- 2001: Vojvodina (caretaker)
- 2004: Železnik (caretaker)
- * Club domestic league appearances and goals

Branislav Novaković (Serbian Cyrillic: Бранислав Новаковић; born 14 December 1958) is a Serbian football manager and former player.

== Playing career ==
Novaković came through the youth system of Vojvodina, making his Yugoslav First League debut in the 1977–78 season. He amassed over 150 appearances in the top flight, before the club suffered relegation to the Yugoslav Second League in 1986. Later on, Novaković played for Vrbas in the Yugoslav Inter-Republic League.

== Managerial career ==
In late 2004, Novaković briefly served as manager of Železnik, having previously been assistant to Mile Tomić.
