= Aleksandar Pantić =

Aleksandar Pantić may refer to:

- Aleksandar Pantić (footballer, born 1978), Serbian footballer
- Aleksandar Pantić (footballer, born 1992), Serbian footballer currently playing in Cádiz CF
