= Aleksandar Selkić =

Serbian footballer (born 1983)

Personal information
- Date of birth: 24 May 1983 (age 43)
- Height: 1.91 m (6 ft 3 in)
- Position: Defender

Youth career
- Basel
- Grasshoppers
- 1998–2002: Zürich

Senior career*
Years	Team	Apps	(Gls)
2002–2004	Spartak Moscow		
2004–2005	Železnik	3	(0)

International career
- FR Yugoslavia U19
- * Club domestic league appearances and goals

Aleksandar Selkić (Serbian Cyrillic: Александар Селкић; born 24 May 1983) is a Swiss-Serbian former footballer.

== Football career ==
Selkić started his youth football career with FC Solothurn. After playing for Zurich Grasshoppers and FC Zurich, he was sold to FC Spartak Moscow where he played 3 seasons. He also played for the Yugoslavia national team from 1998 - 2002 where he participated in the UEFA European Championship where the team placed 4th. After leaving FC Spartak Moscow, he signed with Serbian top league club FK Železnik, where he played in the 2004–05 UEFA Cup, and won the Serbia and Montenegro Cup.

Selkić exited professional football in 2005 due to a series of injuries.

== Professional career ==
Selkić moved back to Switzerland where he held various positions in telecommunications and insurance before moving to private banking. He worked for Bank Sarasin, UBS, Credit Suisse, Vontobel in private banking & wealth management as a relationship manager to high and ultra high net worth individuals.

== Political career ==
Selkić joined Free Democratic Party (FDP) of Switzerland in 2016. He ran for office of the Grand communal council in 2018. Since he has been an integral member of the election campaign team.
