= Uroš Milutinović =

Serbian footballer

Personal information
- Full name: Uroš Milutinović
- Date of birth: 23 October 1962
- Place of birth: Belgrade, PR Serbia, FPR Yugoslavia
- Date of death: 27 April 2015 (aged 52)
- Place of death: Belgrade, Serbia
- Height: 1.80 m (5 ft 11 in)
- Position: Forward

Youth career
- Red Star Belgrade
- Partizan

Senior career*
Years	Team	Apps	(Gls)
1983–1986	Partizan	0	(0)
1987	La Chaux-de-Fonds	9	(2)
- * Club domestic league appearances and goals

Uroš Milutinović (Serbian Cyrillic: Урош Милутиновић; 23 October 1962 – 27 April 2015) was a Serbian footballer who played as a forward for FK Partizan and FC La Chaux-de-Fonds.

He was the son of famed Partizan player Miloš Milutinović. He played a total of 87 matches (scoring 20 goals) for Partizan but none of them were domestic league appearances.
