= Dejan Rađenović =

Serbian football manager and player

Personal information
- Full name: Dejan Rađenović
- Date of birth: 8 May 1975 (age 51)
- Place of birth: Belgrade, SR Serbia, SFR Yugoslavia
- Height: 1.93 m (6 ft 4 in)
- Position: Midfielder

Team information
- Current team: Voždovac (manager)

Youth career
- Partizan

Senior career*
Years	Team	Apps	(Gls)
1993–1998	Partizan	2	(0)
1994–1995	→ Mladost Umčari (loan)		
1995–1996	→ Železnik (loan)		
1996–1997	→ Hajduk Kula (loan)	25	(2)
1998	→ Rad (loan)	12	(1)
1998–2001	OFK Beograd	76	(14)
2000	→ CS Sfaxien (loan)		
2001–2005	Železnik	92	(25)
2003	→ Shenzhen Jianlibao (loan)	11	(0)
2005	Samsunspor	2	(0)
2006	Smederevo	11	(0)
2006–2007	Banat Zrenjanin	23	(2)
2007	Voždovac	16	(0)
2008	Laktaši	10	(6)
2008–2010	Sloga Kraljevo	53	(13)
2010–2011	Grafičar Beograd	29	(5)
2011–2012	Železnik		
2013	Radnički Beograd	9	(2)
Total		371	(70)

International career
2001	FR Yugoslavia	4	(0)

Managerial career
- 2013–2015: Železnik
- 2015–2016: Radnički Beograd
- 2016–2019: Žarkovo
- 2019–2020: OFK Bačka
- 2022: Metalac Gornji Milanovac
- 2023: Radnički Beograd
- 2025: Sloven
- 2025-: Voždovac
- * Club domestic league appearances and goals

Dejan Rađenović (Serbian Cyrillic: Дејан Рађеновић; born 8 May 1975) is a Serbian football manager and former player.

== Club career ==
Rađenović came through the youth system of Partizan, making his senior debut in the final fixture of the 1992–93 season. He later played for Second League club Železnik in the 1995–96 season, helping them win promotion to the First League of FR Yugoslavia. Subsequently, Rađenović spent the entire 1996–97 season with Hajduk Kula, before returning to Partizan. He made one league appearances for the Crno-beli in the first half of the 1997–98 season, before moving to Rad in the winter of 1998. Rađenović then moved on to play for OFK Beograd from 1998 to 2001. He also had a short stint with CS Sfaxien in Tunisia.

After failing to continue his career abroad, Rađenović signed with his former club Železnik in the summer of 2001. He established himself as one of the best players in the country during his four-year tenure with the Lavovi. In addition, Rađenović won the 2004–05 Serbia and Montenegro Cup, scoring the winning goal in the 90th minute of the final. He also played on loan for Chinese club Shenzhen Jianlibao in the meantime.

In the summer of 2005, Rađenović moved abroad again by signing with Turkish side Samsunspor. He made two appearances in the Süper Lig, before leaving the club. In January 2006, Rađenović returned to his homeland and signed with Smederevo. He then spent the entire 2006–07 season with Banat Zrenjanin.

== International career ==
Rađenović made four official appearances for the national team of FR Yugoslavia, at the 2001 Kirin Cup in Japan and at the Millennium Super Soccer Cup in India, winning the tournament.

== Managerial career ==
After hanging up his boots, Rađenović served as manager of Serbian First League clubs OFK Bačka and Metalac Gornji Milanovac. He took charge at FK Voždovac in October 2025.

== Honours ==
Železnik

- Serbia and Montenegro Cup: 2004–05

Sloga Kraljevo

- Serbian League West: 2008–09
