= Slobodan Marković =

Serbian footballer

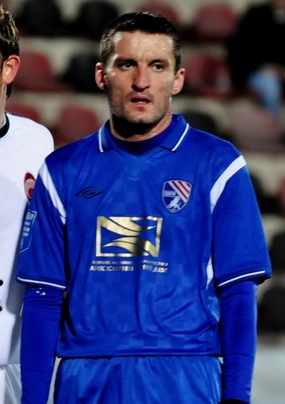
- Marković with Tavriya Simferopol in 2011

Personal information
- Full name: Slobodan Marković
- Date of birth: 9 November 1978 (age 47)
- Place of birth: Zagreb, SFR Yugoslavia
- Height: 1.82 m (5 ft 11 1/2 in)
- Position: Midfielder

Senior career*
Years	Team	Apps	(Gls)
1998–2001	Borac Čačak	88	(17)
2002–2003	Železnik	59	(10)
2004–2005	Metalurh Donetsk	22	(0)
2006	Borac Čačak	12	(2)
2006	Voždovac	12	(1)
2007	Vojvodina	11	(0)
2007–2011	Tavriya Simferopol	106	(4)
2012	Sinđelić Beograd	4	(0)
2013	Šumadija Jagnjilo	10	(1)

International career
2003	Serbia and Montenegro	3	(0)
- * Club domestic league appearances and goals

Slobodan Marković (Serbian Cyrillic: Слободан Марковић; born 9 November 1978) is a Serbian retired footballer who played mainly as a defensive midfielder.

During his club career, Marković represented exclusively Serbian and Ukrainian clubs, including Borac Čačak, Železnik, Metalurh Donetsk, Vojvodina and Tavriya Simferopol.

At international level, Marković earned three caps for Serbia and Montenegro in 2003, making his debut in a friendly against England.
