= Srđan Soldatović =

Serbian footballer

Personal information
- Full name: Srđan Soldatović
- Date of birth: 10 January 1974 (age 52)
- Place of birth: Ćuprija, SFR Yugoslavia
- Height: 1.85 m (6 ft 1 in)
- Position: Goalkeeper

Team information
- Current team: Вождовац Београд (Goalkeeper coach)

Youth career
- 1985–1987: Šumadija 1903
- 1987–1991: Radnički Kragujevac

Senior career*
Years	Team	Apps	(Gls)
1991–1997	Radnički Kragujevac	65	(0)
1997–1999	Radnički Niš	25	(0)
1999–2002	Železnik	32	(0)
2002	Zvezdara	4	(0)
2002–2003	Radnički Niš	26	(0)
2003–2004	Šumadija 1903	32	(0)
2004–2011	Javor Ivanjica	21	(0)
2009–2010	→ Sloga Požega (loan)	15	(0)
2013	Smederevo	1	(0)
Total		221	(0)

Managerial career
- 2011–2012: Javor Ivanjica (Goalkeeper coach)
- 2012–2013: Smederevo (gk coach)
- 2013: Tavriya Simferopol (gk coach)
- 2013–2014: Javor Ivanjica (gk coach)
- 2014–2016: Grbalj (gk coach)
- 2016: Serbia U18 (gk coach)
- 2017–2019: Atyrau (gk coach)
- 2019–2022: Nantong Zhiyun (gk coach)
- 2023: Loznica (gk coach)
- 2023: Zvijezda 09 (gk coach)
- 2024: Bunyodkor (gk coach)
- 2024: Nantong Zhiyun (gk coach)
- 2025: Napredak Kruševac (gk coach)
- 2026: Вождовац Београд (gk coach)
- * Club domestic league appearances and goals

Srđan Soldatović (Serbian Cyrillic: Срђан Солдатовић; born 10 January 1974) is a Serbian retired footballer who played as a goalkeeper, who now works as a goalkeeping coach.

Born in Ćuprija, Soldatović played for Šumadija 1903, Radnički Kragujevac, Badnjevac, Zvezdara, Železnik, Radnički Niš, and Šumadija 1903, Kragujevac before he joined Javor Ivanjica. While he was with Javor, he was loaned to Radnički Kragujevac and Sloga Požega. He also made 4 Jelen SuperLiga appearance.

He retired at the end of 2011, and became goalkeeper coach in Ivanjica. He played 1 match for Smederevo and came out of retirement for a short time, because of problems with deficit players. Later he moved in Tavriya Simferopol and he worked with head coach Mihajlo Jurasović at Zvijezda 09 and Nantong Zhiyun.

- FC “Javor”, Ivanjica, Goalkeeper coach of youth categories, 2006 - 2010.
- FC “Javor”, Ivanjica, Coach U-18, Super league of Serbia, 2010/2011
- FC ”Javor“, Ivanjica, Coach U-16, 2010/2011
- FC ”Javor", Ivanjica, Coach U-14, 2009/2010
- FC “Javor”, Ivanjica, Coach U-12, 2008/2009
- An active player and coach in the youth categories of FC “Javor” Ivanjica 2006-2012.
