= Mateja Maslarević =

Serbian association football player

Personal information
- Date of birth: 12 October 2000 (age 26)
- Place of birth: Čačak, FR Yugoslavia
- Height: 1.90 m (6 ft 3 in)
- Position: Goalkeeper

Team information
- Current team: Trayal Kruševac
- Number: 99

Senior career*
Years	Team	Apps	(Gls)
2018–2021	Borac Čačak	45	(0)
2021–2023	Metalac GM	11	(0)
2022–2023	→ Zlatibor Čajetina (loan)	26	(0)
2024	Radnički Novi Beograd	12	(0)
2024–	Trayal Kruševac	4	(0)
- * Club domestic league appearances and goals as of 26 December 2023

Mateja Maslarević (Serbian Cyrillic: Матеја Масларевић; born 12 October 2000) is a Serbian footballer who plays for Trayal Kruševac.

== Career statistics ==
As of 27 April 2019

Club	Season	League			Cup		Continental		Other		Total	
Club	Season	Division	Apps	Goals	Apps	Goals	Apps	Goals	Apps	Goals	Apps	Goals
Borac Čačak	2018–19	Serbian First League	13	0	2	0	—		—		15	0
Career total			13	0	2	0	—		—		15	0
