= Dragan Simeunović =

Yugoslav footballer (1954–2025)

Personal information
- Date of birth: 17 September 1954
- Place of birth: Kraljevo, PR Serbia, FPR Yugoslavia
- Date of death: 3 November 2025 (aged 71)
- Place of death: Kraljevo, Serbia
- Position: Goalkeeper

Senior career*
Years	Team	Apps	(Gls)
–1976	Sloga Kraljevo		
1976–1978	Red Star Belgrade	1	(0)
1978–1979	Trepča	29	(0)
1979–1980	Vardar	32	(0)
1980–1982	Red Star Belgrade	30	(0)
1983	OFK Beograd	16	(0)
1983–1985	Apollon Kalamarias	46	(0)
1985	Trepča	14	(0)
1986	Budućnost Podgorica	16	(0)
1986–1988	Apollon Kalamarias	45	(0)
1988–1990	Olympiacos Volos	23	(0)
1990–1991	Radnički Beograd	4	(0)
Total		256	(0)

International career
1980	Yugoslavia	1	(0)

Managerial career
- 2004: Panetolikos
- * Club domestic league appearances and goals

Dragan Simeunović (Serbian Cyrillic: Драган Симеуновић; 17 September 1954 – 3 November 2025) was a Yugoslav footballer who played as a goalkeeper. He died on 3 November 2025, at the age of 71.

== International career ==
Simeunović earned his only cap for SFR Yugoslavia on 30 March 1980 in their 2–0 win over Romania in a friendly match.
