= Radomir Koković =

Serbian footballer

Personal information
- Date of birth: 6 January 1984 (age 42)
- Place of birth: Kraljevo, SR Serbia, SFR Yugoslavia
- Height: 1.85 m (6 ft 1 in)
- Positions: Defensive midfielder; centre back

Team information
- Current team: Železničar Pančevo (head coach)

Youth career
- Bubamara Kraljevo
- Sloga Kraljevo
- Red Star Belgrade
- OFK Beograd

College career
Years	Team	Apps	(Gls)
2003–2007	Loyola Greyhounds		

Senior career*
Years	Team	Apps	(Gls)
2007	Sloga Kraljevo	4	(0)
2008–2012	Rad	74	(4)
2011	→ Changchun Yatai (loan)	12	(0)
2012–2014	Napredak Kruševac	53	(5)
2014	Zemun	0	(0)
Total		143	(9)

Managerial career
- 2016–2017: Shanghai JuJu Sports
- 2018–2019: Sinđelić Belgrade
- 2019: Zemun
- 2019–2020: Voždovac
- 2021: RFK Grafičar
- 2021: Radnički Niš
- 2022–2023: Göztepe
- 2025–: Železničar Pančevo
- * Club domestic league appearances and goals

Radomir "Rade" Koković (Serbian Cyrillic: Радомир Раде Koкoвић; born 6 January 1984) is a Serbian professional football manager and former player who is head coach of Serbian SuperLiga club Železničar Pančevo.

== Playing career ==
Koković played football with Loyola College in Maryland in the United States between 2003 and 2007 alongside compatriot Miloš Kocić.

In 2007, he returned to Serbia and played a half season with his birth-city lower league club FK Sloga Kraljevo, before moving, in December 2007, to Belgrade's club FK Rad. He took over as team captain during the 2010–11 season.

On 23 March 2011, Koković moved to China and signed a contract with Chinese Super League side Changchun Yatai on a loan deal for three months. His father Đorđe is also a former footballer.

From 2012 to 2014, he played for FK Napredak Kruševac and in the 2012–13 Serbian First League season became champion and got promoted to the Serbian SuperLiga.

In the summer of 2014, Koković joined FK Zemun playing in the Serbian League Belgrade. After suffering, at one point, what seemed a minor injury, complications followed and he was forced to finish his playing career at only the age of 30 in the winter of 2014.

== Managerial career ==
Koković started off his managerial career being appointed as manager of China League Two club Shanghai JuJu Sports F.C., where he stayed during 2016.

Between 2018 and 2019, he managed three clubs in Serbia. From July 2018 to April 2019, FK Sinđelić Belgrade, from April to May 2019 FK Zemun and in May 2019, Koković was appointed the manager of Serbian SuperLiga club FK Voždovac. He held this position until March 2020 when he was sacked after a run of 5 straight losses.

== Managerial statistics ==
As of 8 November 2026

Managerial record by team and tenure
Team	From	To	Record				
Team	From	To	G	W	D	L	Win %
Shanghai JuJu Sports	January 2016	December 2016	22	4	4	14	18.18
Sinđelić Belgrade	July 2018	April 2019	33	12	12	9	36.36
Zemun	April 2019	May 2019	7	3	3	1	42.86
Voždovac	May 2019	March 2020	26	10	6	10	38.46
RFK Grafičar	September 2020	March 2021	19	10	6	3	52.63
Radnički Niš	September 2021	September 2021	2	0	1	1	0.00
Göztepe S.K.	July 2019	November 2023	9	5	2	2	55.56
Železničar Pančevo	4 March 2025	Present	66	32	14	20	48.48
Total			177	71	47	59	40.11

== Honours ==
=== Club ===
Napredak

- Serbian First League: 2012–13
