= Miloš Milutinović =

Serbian footballer

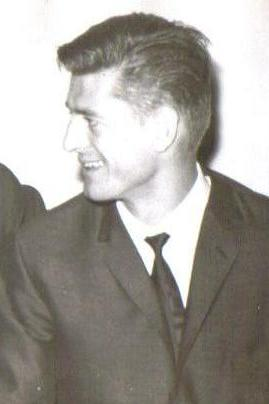

Personal information
- Full name: Miloš Milutinović
- Date of birth: 5 February 1933
- Place of birth: Bajina Bašta, Kingdom of Yugoslavia
- Date of death: 28 January 2003 (aged 69)
- Place of death: Belgrade, FR Yugoslavia
- Height: 1.81 m (5 ft 11 1/2 in)
- Positions: Winger; striker

Youth career
- 1948–1951: Bor

Senior career*
| Years | Team | Apps | (Gls) |
| 1952–1958 | Partizan | 87 | (53) |
| 1958–1960 | OFK Beograd | 8 | (9) |
| 1960–1961 | Bayern Munich | 20 | (5) |
| 1961–1963 | Paris | 66 | (28) |
| 1963–1965 | Stade Français | 44 | (7) |
| 1968–1969 | OFK Beograd | 20 | (5) |
| Total | | 245 | (107) |

International career
| 1953–1958 | Yugoslavia | 33 | (16) |

Managerial career
- 1966–1967: OFK Beograd
- 1970–1971: Dubočica
- 1972–1974: Proleter Zrenjanin
- 1975–1976: Atlas
- 1977–1978: Beşiktaş
- 1980–1982: Velež Mostar
- 1982–1984: Partizan
- 1984–1985: Yugoslavia
- 1986–1987: Beşiktaş
- 1987–1988: Altay
- 1990–1991: Partizan
- * Club domestic league appearances and goals

Miloš Milutinović (Serbian Cyrillic: Милош Милутиновић; 5 February 1933 – 28 January 2003) was a Serbian professional footballer and manager from Yugoslavia.

Milutinović is regarded as one of the most talented players in his country's history, being nicknamed Plava čigra (The Blond Buzzer) for his skills.

== Club career ==
During his club career, Milutinović played for FK Bor, FK Partizan, OFK Beograd, FC Bayern Munich, RCF Paris, and Stade Français Paris. In the 1955–56 season, he scored two goals in the first ever European Champion Clubs' Cup match, a 3–3 draw between FK Partizan and Sporting Clube de Portugal, then scored four goals in the return leg which Partizan won 5–2 in Belgrade. In the quarter-finals second leg, he scored two goals in a 3–0 win over eventual champions Real Madrid, but that was not enough to overcome Real Madrid's 4–0 win in the first leg.

In total, he played 213 matches and scored 231 goals for FK Partizan, winning two national cups (1954 and 1957). He then moved to OFK Beograd and later to Bayern Munich. In 1959, he underwent surgery for his ongoing lung problems. He stayed one year in Germany before playing in France.

== International career ==
For the Yugoslavia national football team, Milutinović was named the player of the tournament as Yugoslavia won the European youth title in 1951, finishing top scorer with four goals. He made his full international debut on 21 May 1953 against Wales, in a 5–2 victory.

Milutinović earned 33 caps in total and represented the country in the 1954 and 1958 World Cups. He played his final international at the latter tournament against West Germany.

=== International goals ===
| # | Date | Venue | Opponent | Score | Result | Competition |
|---|---|---|---|---|---|---|
| 1. | 8 November 1953 | City Stadium, Skoplje | Israel | 1–0 | 1–0 | 1954 FIFA World Cup qualification |
| 2. | 16 June 1954 | Stade Olympique de la Pontaise, Lausanne | France | 1–0 | 1–0 | 1954 FIFA World Cup |
| 3. | 25 September 1955 | JNA Stadium, Belgrade | West Germany | 1–0 | 3–1 | Friendly |
| 4. | 19 October 1955 | Dalymount Park, Dublin | Republic of Ireland | 0–1 | 1–4 | Friendly |
| 5. | 19 October 1955 | Dalymount Park, Dublin | Republic of Ireland | 0–2 | 1–4 | Friendly |
| 6. | 19 October 1955 | Dalymount Park, Dublin | Republic of Ireland | 1–3 | 1–4 | Friendly |
| 7. | 30 October 1955 | Prater Stadium, Vienna | Austria | 1–1 | 2–1 | Friendly |
| 8. | 9 September 1956 | JNA Stadium, Belgrade | Indonesia | 1–0 | 4–2 | Friendly |
| 9. | 9 September 1956 | JNA Stadium, Belgrade | Indonesia | 2–0 | 4–2 | Friendly |
| 10. | 9 September 1956 | JNA Stadium, Belgrade | Indonesia | 3–0 | 4–2 | Friendly |
| 11. | 12 May 1957 | Maksimir Stadium, Zagreb | Italy | 2–0 | 6–1 | Friendly |
| 12. | 12 May 1957 | Maksimir Stadium, Zagreb | Italy | 4–0 | 6–1 | Friendly |
| 13. | 15 September 1957 | JNA Stadium, Belgrade | Austria | 3–3 | 3–3 | Friendly |
| 14. | 17 November 1957 | JNA Stadium, Belgrade | Romania | 1–0 | 2–0 | 1958 FIFA World Cup qualification |
| 15. | 17 November 1957 | JNA Stadium, Belgrade | Romania | 2–0 | 2–0 | 1958 FIFA World Cup qualification |
| 16. | 11 May 1958 | JNA Stadium, Belgrade | England | 1–0 | 5–0 | Friendly |

== Managerial career ==
After retirement from playing, Milutinović became a manager, and managed OFK Beograd, FK Dubočica (Leskovac), FK Proleter (Zrenjanin), Atlas, Beşiktaş J.K., Altay, FK Velež Mostar (won national cup in 1981 and Balkans Cup in 1981), FK Partizan (won national championship in 1983), and the Yugoslavia national team.

== Personal life ==
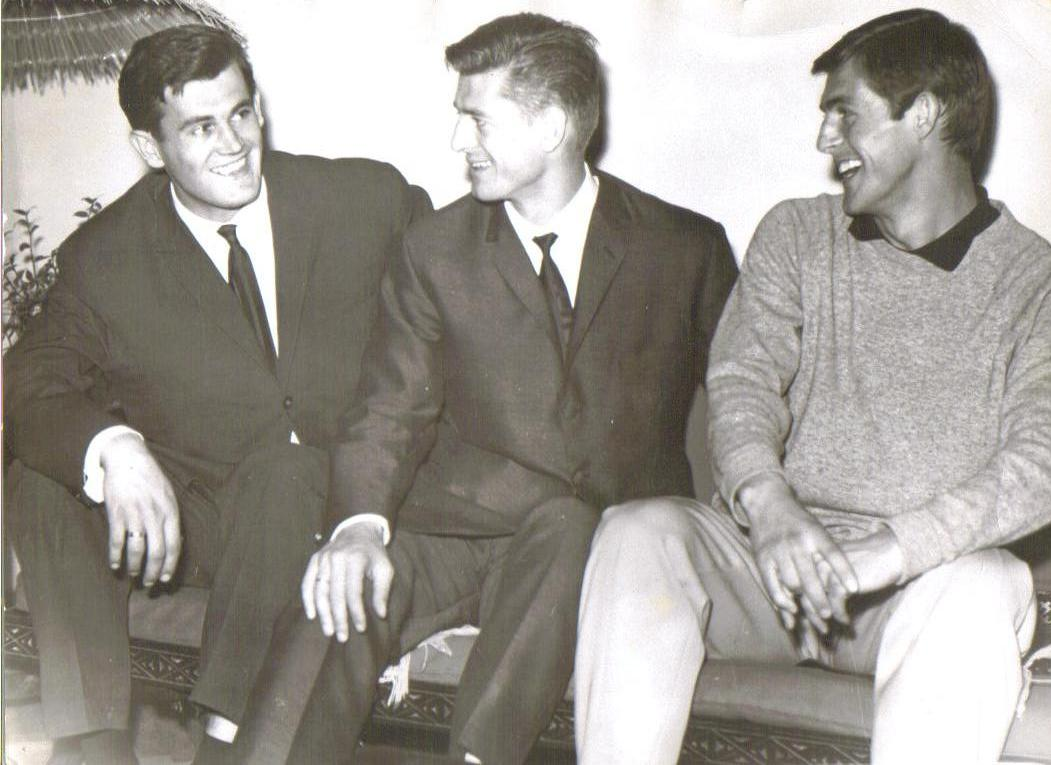
Milutinović (center) with his two brothers Milorad (left) and Bora (right)

Miloš was the brother of famous football manager Bora Milutinović, and brother of 1958 World Cup teammate Milorad Milutinović. In a 2006 interview, his former team-mate Dragoslav Šekularac said that "Miloš Milutinović as a player was a 9/10 and as a man was a 29/10."

He died on 23 January 2003 in Belgrade, at the age of 69. His son Uroš (also a footballer) died in 2015.

== Honours ==
=== Player ===
Partizan

- Yugoslav Cup: 1954, 1956–57

=== Manager ===
Velež Mostar

- Yugoslav Cup: 1980–81
- Balkans Cup: 1980–81

Partizan

- Yugoslav First League: 1982–83

Sporting positions
| Preceded by Ademir | FIFA World Cup opening goal 1954 | Succeeded by Agne Simonsson |
