= FK Voždovac =

Association football club in Belgrade, Serbia

Voždovac
- Full name: Fudbalski Klub Voždovac
- Nickname: Zmajevi (The Dragons)
- Founded: 1912; 114 years ago
- Ground: Voždovac Stadium
- Capacity: 5,200
- Chairman: Marko Zdravković
- Manager: Dejan Branković
- League: Serbian First League
- 2025–26: Serbian First League, 3rd of 16
- Website: fkvozdovac.rs
Home colours	Away colours

Fudbalski klub Voždovac (Serbian Cyrillic: Фудбалски клуб Вождовац) is a professional football club based in Voždovac, Belgrade, Serbia, which competes in the Serbian First League, the second tier.

Nicknamed "The Dragons", they experienced little success in the Yugoslavian era, but have become one of Belgrade's best and most stable clubs in modern times since Serbia's independence.

They are known for their stadium on top of the shopping center.

== History ==
Old crest

The club was formed in 1912, under the name SK Dušanovac and its president in that year was Danilo Stojanović, "Čika Dača" who was also the coach in that year. The club was named after Dušanovac, a suburb in Belgrade where the club was formed. Initially it was a club whose players and followers were mostly students from the Economics Gymnasium. After the end of World War I the club substantially improved however it never archived to be in the top like other clubs such as BSK Belgrade or SK Jugoslavija.

In 1929, it is renamed into Voždovački SK (Voždovački sport klub). The main success in this period was the winning of the II League of Belgrade Football Subassociation in the 1933–34 season, and the III League of Belgrade in 1948–49. In the 1963–64 season, they won the Serbian Republic League, then the Yugoslav third tier, and promoted to the Yugoslav Second League. After Red Star Belgrade's new ground Marakana was built between 1959 and 1963, Voždovački SK played its home matches on Marakana's secondary pitch with bleachers around it.

In 1973, another local club, Sloboda Belgrade, formed in 1953 and Belgrade League champion in 1968, was dissolved. The municipal authorities decided to hand Sloboda's ground over to Voždovački, which then changed its name to FK Voždovac. The first major achievement was the winning of the Belgrade Football Association Cup in 1975. During the following three decades Voždovac competed mostly in the lower Serbian leagues, until the season of 2003–04, when they won the Serbian League Belgrade without a single defeat, achieving promotion to the Serbian First League, the national second tier.

On 28 June 2005, Železnik won the Serbia and Montenegro Cup but, struggling financially, merged with Voždovac. As a result, Voždovac gained access to the 2005–06 First League of Serbia and Montenegro, finishing in third place and qualifying for European competition. However, due to the continuing financial difficulties after the merger, club officials decided not to request the license for European competitions.

Since the opening of the new stadium in August 2013, the club has been regarded as relatively stable within Serbian football, supported in part by commercial partnerships with businesses operating within the stadium complex. The club's management has also introduced initiatives aimed at attracting a youger supporter base, including the development of a modern website and the redesign of the club's crest. The updated crest incorporates a red dragon, reflecting the club's nickname, and replaced the previous design. These efforts were intended to differentiate the club's image and presentation from that of the other Serbian clubs.

Voždovac finished the 2019/20 season in 8th place under manager Radomir Koković who was fired late in the season due to a run of losses, former player Jovan Damjanović took over the managers role and guided the club to a safe mid table finish.

== Stadium ==
The old Voždovac Stadium was a multi-purpose stadium. It was used mostly for football matches and was the home ground of Voždovac, with a capacity of 5,780 people. It was demolished in 2011.

Voždovac play their home games at the Voždovac Stadium located on the fourth floor of a shopping center and it meets all UEFA regulations. It has 5,174 seats, the pitch is 24 meters above ground while the tallest stands are 45 meters above.

The stadium was opened for a league game against Jagodina in the fourth round of the Superliga on 31 August 2013. It is also the first time a Superliga game was played on artificial grass.

== Supporters ==
=== Groups ===
The organized supporters of FK Voždovac are the Invalidi (Invalids). However, the first organised supporting group was formed in 1987, and was named Vilenjaci (The Elves). Initially consisted of about 30 members, mostly former and youth players from the neighborhood. Along with Vilenjaci, another group named Zmajevi (Dragons) appeared, which is simultaneously the traditional nickname of the club. Vilenjaci grew with time, and they were often involved in disturbs. They made an effort to be original in their supporting. Pirotechnical fireworks were a usual way of provoking match interruptions.

In 1989, another group named Genoes United was formed in the east stand of the stadium, and by that time Zmajevi accepted to join Vilenjaci. Shortly afterwards Genoes also joined Vilenjaci on the western stand. In the season 1989–90 another group was formed, Hasini Trafikari, named after a former club player, nicknamed Hasa. Initially formed in the south stand, they would also ended up merging with Vilenjaci on the western stand. However, when it looked that the group was stronger than ever, it ended up being disbanded.

In 1990, a new group, that was initially more similar to a street gang than to football fans, was formed and named Invalidi. During the 1990s, the group was constantly growing, and besides football their presence was also noticed in other sports events in which the club participated, most notably in women's handball. Obviously the most inspiring period for club fans was the period the club competed in the top league. Today the group consists of about 100 young men.

=== Friendships ===
The club's supporters have maintained friendly relations with supporters of OFK Beograd and ŁKS Łomża.

== Honours ==
- Serbian Republic League
  - Winners (1): 1963–64
- Serbian League Belgrade
  - Winners (2): 2003–04, 2011–12

== Kit manufacturers and shirt sponsors ==
Period	Kit Manufacturer	Shirt Sponsor
2010–2022	NAAI	
2022–present	Joma	efbet

== Current squad ==
As of 24 September 2026

Note: Flags indicate national team as defined under FIFA eligibility rules; some limited exceptions apply. Players may hold more than one non-FIFA nationality.

No.	Pos.	Nation	Player
1	GK	SRB	Miloš Debeljaković
2	DF	SRB	Ahmed Škrijelj
3	DF	SRB	Pavle Mihajlović
4	DF	MKD	Andrija Dimeski
5	DF	SRB	Veljko Đokić
6	MF	JPN	Yu Horike
7	FW	SRB	Miloš Jović (on loan from Lecce)
8	MF	SRB	Vukašin Braunović (captain)
9	MF	SRB	Ognjen Dimitrić
10	MF	SRB	Luka Svetličić
11	MF	SRB	Ognjen Ajdar
12	GK	SRB	Luka Tasić
14	FW	CHN	Zihao Lin (on loan from Hubei Istar)
16	MF	SRB	Luka Maksimović
17	MF	SRB	Vuk Čiča
18	DF	FRA	Maximilien Boussou
19	FW	NGR	Abba Adam Musa

No.	Pos.	Nation	Player
20	DF	SRB	Veljko Prodanić
21	MF	SRB	Jasin Rašljanin
22	FW	SRB	Lazar Milošev
23	DF	SRB	Vladimir Nedeljković
24	DF	SRB	Stefan Golubović
25	DF	SRB	Nikola Čejović
26	DF	SRB	Đorđe Popović
27	MF	SRB	Mihajlo Butraković
28	DF	BEL	Wirsiy Nsolo
29	FW	NED	Quincy Tavares
30	MF	SRB	Savo Rašković
31	DF	SRB	Luka Nedović
32	GK	SRB	Aleksandar Kahriman
33	MF	NED	Achraf Madi
34	MF	SRB	Danilo Knežević
39	FW	SRB	Veljko Mladenović
40	GK	SRB	Filip Pavlović

=== Out on loan ===
Note: Flags indicate national team as defined under FIFA eligibility rules; some limited exceptions apply. Players may hold more than one non-FIFA nationality.

No.	Pos.	Nation	Player
—	FW	SRB	Milan Dobrašinović (at Radnički Obrenovac until the end of the 2026–27 season)

== Club officials ==
=== Coaching staff ===
Position	Name
Head coach	(Serbia) Dejan Branković
Assistant coach	(Serbia) Aleksandar Petrović (Serbia) Stefan Filipović
Goalkeeper coach	(Serbia) Srđan Soldatović
Fitness coach	(Croatia) Duško Korać
Secretary of the coaching staff	(Serbia) Pavle Žigić
Physiotherapist	(Serbia) Ivan Jaćević
TK Physiotherapist	(Serbia) Luka Ilić
Economic	(North Macedonia) Dejan Cvetkovski
Doctor	(Serbia) Veselin Aleksić

== Notable former players ==
This is a list of FK Voždovac players with senior national team appearances:

- (Serbia) Dušan Anđelković
- (Serbia) Stefan Babović
- (Serbia) Nikola Beljić
- (Serbia) Nikola Ćirković
- (Serbia) Jovan Damjanović
- (Serbia) Nikola Đurđić
- (Serbia) Marko Gajić
- (Serbia) Marko Ilić
- (Serbia) Dejan Milovanović
- (Serbia) Jovan Nišić
- (Serbia) Aleksandar Paločević
- (Serbia) Miloš Pantović
- (Serbia) Nemanja Pejčinović
- (Serbia and Montenegro) Goran Drulić
- (Serbia and Montenegro) Miloš Kolaković
- (Serbia and Montenegro) Slobodan Marković
- (Serbia and Montenegro) Aleksandar Pantić
- (Serbia and Montenegro) Radovan Radaković
- (Serbia and Montenegro) Dejan Rađenović
- (Serbia and Montenegro) Dragan Šarac
- (Serbia and Montenegro) Aleksandar Živković
- (Bosnia and Herzegovina) Mario Božić
- (Bosnia and Herzegovina) Vladan Grujić
- (Bosnia and Herzegovina) Nermin Haskić
- (Bosnia and Herzegovina) Dušan Kerkez
- (Bosnia and Herzegovina) Nemanja Supić
- (Estonia) Bogdan Vaštšuk
- (Guinea) Sekou Keita
- (Jamaica) Junior Flemmings
- (Lithuania) Justas Lasickas
- (North Macedonia) Tome Kitanovski
- (Montenegro) Darko Božović
- (Montenegro) Darko Bulatović
- (Montenegro) Đorđije Ćetković
- (Montenegro) Mladen Kašćelan
- (Montenegro) Adam Marušić
- (Montenegro) Nemanja Nikolić
- (Montenegro) Nikola Vujnović
- (Ukraine) Marko Dević

For the list of all current and former players with Wikipedia article, please see: Category:FK Voždovac players.

== Historical list of coaches ==
- (Socialist Federal Republic of Yugoslavia) Danilo Stojanović (1912)
- (Socialist Federal Republic of Yugoslavia) Đorđe Kačunković
- (Socialist Federal Republic of Yugoslavia) Gojko Zec (1965–1966)
- (Socialist Federal Republic of Yugoslavia) Đorđe Vujadinović (1967–1973)
- Mlađa Mitrović
- (Serbia and Montenegro) Zoran Lončar (2003–2004)
- (Serbia and Montenegro) Mihailo Ivanović (2005–2006)
- (Serbia) Tomislav Sivić (June 2006–August 2006)
- (Serbia) Dušan Jevrić (August 2006–February 2007)
- (Serbia) Miroslav Vukašinović (February 2007–April 2007)
- (Serbia) Mihailo Ivanović (April 2007 – 2007)
- (Serbia) Čedomir Đoinčević (2007–November 2007)
- (Serbia) Dragi Kaličanin (2008–09)
- (Serbia) Mihailo Ivanović (July 1, 2012 – March 31, 2013)
- (Serbia) Aleksandar Janjić (April 1, 2013 – June 30, 2013)
- (Serbia) Nenad Lalatović (July 1, 2013 – Jan 16, 2014)
- (Serbia) Zoran Milinković (Jan 18, 2014–2015)
- (Serbia) Bratislav Živković (2015–16)
- (Serbia) Ilija Stolica (2016–17)
- (Serbia) Jovan Damjanović (2018)
- (Serbia) Miloš Veselinović (2018)
- (Serbia) Dragan Aničić (2018–19)
- (Serbia) Radomir Koković (2019–20)
- (Serbia) Jovan Damjanović (2020–21)
- (Serbia) Predrag Rogan (2021)
- (Serbia) Nikola Puača (14 Aug 2022-)
- (Serbia) Marko Savić (2023– Feb 24)
- (Serbia) Ivan Kurtušić (Oct 2024 – Dec 2024)
- (Serbia) Dejan Đuričić (Dec 2024 – Oct 2025)
- (Serbia) Dejan Rađenović (Oct 2025 –)
