= Aleksandar Pantić (footballer, born 1978) =

Serbian footballer

Personal information
- Full name: Aleksandar Pantić
- Date of birth: 1 October 1978 (age 48)
- Place of birth: Prokuplje, SFR Yugoslavia
- Height: 1.80 m (5 ft 11 in)
- Position: Right-back

Youth career
- Topličanin

Senior career*
Years	Team	Apps	(Gls)
1997–1999	Dinamo Pančevo	24	(0)
1999–2002	Rad	90	(4)
2003	Zemun	5	(1)
2003–2004	Obilić	38	(1)
2005	Železnik	8	(0)
2005–2006	Voždovac	28	(0)
2006–2008	Red Star Belgrade	21	(0)
2008–2010	Omonia	19	(1)
2010–2011	Alki Larnaca	19	(0)
2011	Rudar Prijedor	14	(2)
2012	Radnik Surdulica	14	(0)
2012	Sinđelić Niš	12	(2)
2013	Dinamo Pančevo		
Total		292	(11)

International career
2004	Serbia and Montenegro	2	(0)
- * Club domestic league appearances and goals

Aleksandar Pantić (Serbian Cyrillic: Александар Пантић; born 1 October 1978) is a Serbian former professional footballer who played as a defender.

== Club career ==
After playing for Rad, Zemun, Obilić, Železnik and Voždovac in the First League of Serbia and Montenegro, Pantić signed a four-year contract with Red Star Belgrade in June 2006. He helped the club win the double in the 2006–07 season.

== International career ==
Pantić was capped twice for Serbia and Montenegro, making both appearances at the 2004 Kirin Cup.

== Honours ==
Železnik

- Serbia and Montenegro Cup: 2004–05

Red Star Belgrade

- Serbian SuperLiga: 2006–07
- Serbian Cup: 2006–07
