= FK Radnički Beograd =

Radnički Beograd
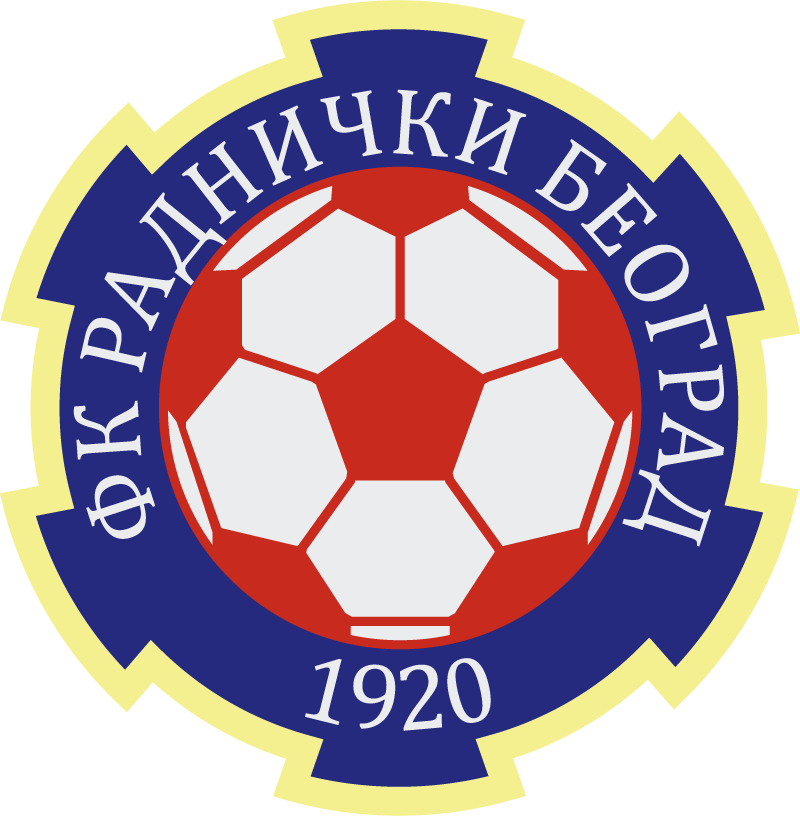
- Full name: Fudbalski klub Radnički Beograd
- Nickname: Majstori sa Dunava (The Masters from the Danube)
- Founded: 1920; 106 years ago
- Ground: Stadion FK Radnički (NBG)
- Capacity: 5,000
- Chairman: Uroš Stojković
- Manager: Goran Serafimović
- League: Serbian League Belgrade
- 2024–25: Serbian League Belgrade, 11th
- Website: radnicki.rs
Home colours	Away colours

FK Radnički Beograd (Serbian Cyrillic: ФК Раднички Београд) is a Serbian professional football club based in New Belgrade. They compete in the third-tier Serbian League Belgrade.

The club is often referred to as FK Radnički Novi Beograd because it was initially formed in Belgrade proper, and only later moved to New Belgrade area.

== History ==
=== Early history ===
Inspired by the matches between the existing clubs in the Kingdom of Yugoslavia the students of Belgrade's construction-craft school held the constituent assembly in their school on April 20, 1920, and formed a football club named BSK Radnički (БСК Раднички). Among the 29 founding members, Ilija Krstić was elected the first club president. After collecting enough money to buy their first ball, a rarity in those days, the next main problem was to find a proper pitch to play on. Some members lobbied for the club to play at the ground of another Belgrade club, Srpski Mač, while others wanted to play in the area named Bara Venecija at a ground that FK Železničar Beograd still uses today. The decision was made that Radnički's first pitch was going to be in Bara Venecija, a Belgrade urban neighbourhood located on the right bank of the Sava river.

Unfortunately, there is no record of the first matches played during 1920; the first match covered by the newspapers was against Brđanin from Senjak during the autumn of 1921 which Radnički lost by 0–4. On March 22, 1921, the club joined the Belgrade Football Association and started competing in the Second Division group B, finishing in 5th place among six clubs. During the 1922–23 season, playing in the same league and with a mixed squad together with FK Grafičar, they finished 6th out of eight. Radnički's first major success was achieved when they were league champions in the 1924–25 season. They finished the season with 9 wins, 1 draw and 2 defeats, and the players in that season were Milan Ristić, Milojević, Sveta Pačić, Janaković, Petrović, Zistahis, Bora Kostić, Slobodan Paunović, Radivoje Srećković, Obojević and Dušan Milosavljević.

=== The golden era ===
However, the greatest moments in club's history came after the Second World War. In 1950 the club won promotion to the Yugoslav Second League and in 1953, after beating another historical club FK Mačva Šabac in the play-offs, the club gained promotion to the Yugoslav First League. In their first top league season, in 1953–54 the club finished in 12th place, among 14, and avoided relegation; in the next season the club did better, finishing 10th. In the 1955–56 Yugoslav First League the club achieved its biggest success by finishing in 3rd place, behind only the Belgrade giants Red Star and Partizan. The team that season was coached by former Partizan coach Illes Spitz and among the best players were Zlatan Ljujić, Blagoje Vidinić, M. Petrović, Radmilo Ristić, Đura Čokić, B. Pavlović, M. Ljubenović, Milorad Diskić, Pflander, Pašković, Zoran Prljinčević, Aleksandar Petaković, Ljuba Ognjanović, Josipović, Jovan Jezerkić, Tihomir Marković Marcel Žigante and Bozidar Mladenovic.

The next season playing with basically the same team, the club finished 8th but reached the 1957 Yugoslav Cup final. The match was played in Belgrade on May 26 against FK Partizan in the JNA Stadium. At half-time Radnički was winning by 3–0, having scored the goals Belin (own-goal), Petaković and Prljinčević. That final is remembered as one of the craziest ever, because in the second half Partizan turned the match around and in the end won 5–3 with goals from Valok, Mesaroš and Kaloperović. Despite the loss, Radnički made an impact in Yugoslav football at that time. Due to playing their matches on a field at Viline Vode near the Danube, the team earned the nickname of "Majstori sa Dunava" ("Мајстори са Дунава"), in translation: "The Masters from the Danube".

In the 1957–58 Yugoslav First League Radnički finished 3rd again, behind Dinamo Zagreb, Partizan and in front of Red Star with equal number of points but better goal difference. In the season 1958–59 they finished 4th, after Red Star, Partizan and Vojvodina. However, these were the last seasons of the golden era of the Danube masters, because afterwards a fall begin, with a 9th place in 1959–60 and a relegation awarding bottom 12th place in the 1960–61 Yugoslav First League.

After playing few seasons in the Yugoslav Second League Radnički manages to return to the Yugoslav First League in 1965, however it finished the 1965–66 Yugoslav First League in a disappointing 15th place out of 16 being relegated again.

=== Fall ===
After the relegation from the top league in 1966 to the Second League, the club suffered further relegation to the Serbian Republic League (third Yugoslav tier) in the next season. For the next decade the club fails to return to higher leagues and in 1975 they are further relegated into the Belgrade zone leagues. It is during this period that the club moves to a new developing area of Belgrade on the left bank of Sava river, named Novi Beograd (New Belgrade).

=== Recent history ===
The club has spent a couple of decades playing in lower leagues, mostly in the Belgrade zone League, and afterwards in the newly formed Serbian Second League (still within the Federation league system). During this period the club has developed their youth program and numerous players that later became professionals begin their playing careers in the club. The rise begins in 1986 when Radnički wins the regional Belgrade Cup, further being confirmed by the promotion in 1991 to the First League of FR Yugoslavia with Dejan Gluščević scoring 15 goals in 28 appearances. In their first season in second national level, they finished top and achieved promotion back to the top league, this time to the 1992–93 First League of FR Yugoslavia. The club played four consecutive seasons in top league, having archived the 15th place in 1992–93, the 8th place in 1993–94, the 10th place in 1994–95 and bottom 20th place in 1995–96 which led to subsequent relegation. At the time, for sponsorship reasons, they were briefly known as Radnički IMEL and Radnički Elektron.

The club, now known as Radnički Jugopetrol, plays in the Second League all the way until 2004 when the club returns to the top league and plays in the 2004–05 First League of Serbia and Montenegro where despite finishing 12th out of 16, meaning out of relegation zone, the club board due to financial troubles decided to abandon the top league competition.

After giving up competing in the top level, Radnički was relegated to the Serbian League Belgrade, the third level of competition. Radnički continued to struggle in the lower ranks of Belgrade football, lost the sponsorship from Jugopetrol by 2008 and eventually fell down the ladder to as low as the 5th competition level in 2011. It bounced back after one season and in the summer of 2015, following a merger with another struggling Belgrade side FK Železnik, gained promotion to the 3d level, Serbian League Belgrade, where they are playing to this day.

=== Recent seasons ===
Season	League	Pos.	P	W	D	L	GS	GA	P	Cup	Notes	Manager
1992–93	1	15	36	11	7	18	45	62	29	Last 16		
1993–94	1 – IB (Fall)	3 (13)	18	7	6	5	32	24	20	Last 16	Promoted to 1A	
1993–94	1 – IA (Spring)	8	18	5	5	8	15	28	19	Last 16	Relegated to 1B	
1994–95	1 – IB (Fall)	3 (13)	18	11	2	5	24	16	24	Last 32	Promoted to 1A	
1994–95	1 – IA (Spring)	10	18	3	3	12	20	39	15	Last 32	Relegated to 1B	
1995–96	1 – IB (Fall)	6 (16)	18	6	4	8	29	32	22	Last 16		
1995–96	1 – IB (Spring)	10 (20)	18	2	4	12	13	32	17	Last 16	Relegated to 2	
1996–97	2 – East	7	34	?	?	?	?	?	49	Last 32		
1997–98	2 – East	12	34	?	?	?	?	?	51	did not qualify		
1998–99	2 – East	11	21	8	2	11	34	34	26	Last 32	(Note: Championship abandoned officially on May 14, 1999, due to the NATO attacks on FR Yugoslavia.)	
1999–2000	2 – North	3	34	19	4	11	64	45	61	Last 32		
2000–01	2 – North	3	34	19	7	8	58	25	64	Last 32		
2001–02	2 – North	6	34	14	15	5	47	29	57	Last 32		
2002–03	2 – North	3	33	18	7	8	63	38	61	Last 16		
2003–04	2 – North	1	36	27	5	4	77	25	86	Last 16	Promoted	
2004–05	1	12	30	10	5	15	33	38	35	Last 32	Withdrew (Note: Stayed up but withdrew form top league competition for 2005–06 season due to financial difficulties and thus got relegated to third league.)	
2005–06	3 – Belgrade	15	38	13	7	18	52	60	46	Last 32		
2006–07	3 – Belgrade	8	34	13	10	11	40	37	49	did not qualify		
2007–08	3 – Belgrade	8	30	12	6	12	37	37	42	did not qualify		
2008–09	3 – Belgrade	16	30	4	7	19	22	43	19	did not qualify	Relegated	
2009–10	4 – Belgrade	10	34	12	6	16	42	44	42	did not qualify		
2010–11	4 – Belgrade	18	34	5	11	18	28	51	26	did not qualify	Relegated	
2011–12	5 – BIP	3	34	20	5	9	64	30	65	did not qualify	Promoted	
2012–13	4 – Belgrade	10	32	10	12	10	38	32	42	did not qualify		
2013–14	4 – Belgrade	6	30	13	6	11	39	48	45	did not qualify		
2014–15	4 – Belgrade	11	28	8	9	11	31	34	33	did not qualify	Promoted	
2015–16	3 – Belgrade	5	30	14	7	9	40	29	49	did not qualify		
2016–17	3 – Belgrade	9	30	13	5	12	35	36	44	did not qualify		
2017–18	3 – Belgrade	6	30	12	10	8	24	23	46	Last 32		
2018–19	3 – Belgrade	4	30	13	8	9	44	30	47	did not qualify		
2019–20	3 – Belgrade	6	17	6	6	5	19	17	24	did not qualify		
2020–21	3 – Belgrade	10	38	15	13	10	59	40	58	did not qualify		
2021–22	3 – Belgrade	1	30	21	5	4	53	21	68	Last 16	Promoted	
2022–23	2 – Serbian First League	8	37	13	6	18	32	50	45	Last 16		
2023–24	2 – Serbian First League	16	37	6	8	23	32	68	20 (Note: The club was docked six points.)	Last 32	Relegated	
2024–25	3 – Belgrade	11	26	6	4	16	22	46	22	Preliminary Round	Promoted	

== Honours ==
- Yugoslav Cup
  - Runners-up (1): 1956–57

== Current squad ==
As of 31 December 2023

Note: Flags indicate national team as defined under FIFA eligibility rules; some limited exceptions apply. Players may hold more than one non-FIFA nationality.

No.	Pos.	Nation	Player
1	GK	SRB	Danilo Đulčić
2	MF	COD	Mani Banga
3	DF	SRB	Vladimir Nedeljković
4	DF	SRB	Filip Gajić
6	MF	SRB	Danilo Knežević
7	DF	SRB	Ilija Matejević
9	FW	SRB	Stefan Mihajlović
10	MF	SRB	Jasin Nuredini
11	FW	AUS	Staniša Velinov
13	MF	SRB	Milenko Škorić
14	DF	SRB	Todor Milinković
15	DF	SRB	Miroljub Pešić
16	DF	SRB	Stefan Dabić
17	FW	SRB	Dalibor Lazić
18	DF	SRB	Luka Brašić
19	GK	SRB	Borivoje Ristić

No.	Pos.	Nation	Player
20	FW	SRB	Lazar Stojanović
21	MF	SRB	Mladen Lukić
22	GK	SRB	Luka Krstović
23	MF	SRB	Nemanja Đokić (captain)
24	FW	SRB	Luka Vulin
25	FW	ENG	Andre Edionhon
27	FW	SRB	Đorđe Vasić
28	MF	SRB	Lazar Hrnjaz
30	MF	SRB	Ognjen Đurić
31	GK	SRB	Mateja Maslarević
32	MF	SRB	Andrija Ćurčić
33	MF	NGR	Justine Aniekwuilo
34	DF	SRB	Rijad Koca
38	MF	SRB	Kosta Veselinović
41	MF	SRB	Milan Ilić
87	DF	SRB	Ognjen Đurković

=== Out on loan ===
Note: Flags indicate national team as defined under FIFA eligibility rules; some limited exceptions apply. Players may hold more than one non-FIFA nationality.

No.	Pos.	Nation	Player
—	DF	SRB	Danilo Aleksić (at FK Prva Iskra)
—	FW	SRB	Nikola Tejić (at Budućnost Dobanovci)

== Notable players ==
While playing with Radnički, Zoran Prljinčević became Yugoslav First League top scorer in the 1960–61 season, sharing the title with Todor Veselinović (FK Vojvodina), both with 16 goals.

The following is a list of club's players with national team appearances:

(Kingdom of Yugoslavia) (Socialist Federal Republic of Yugoslavia)

- Prvoslav Dragićević
- Jovan Jezerkić
- Milan Ljubenović
- Ljubomir Ognjanović
- Radivoje Ognjanović
- Aleksandar Petaković
- Dragan Simeunović
- Blagoje Vidinić

(Serbia and Montenegro) (Serbia)

- Dušan Anđelković
- Saša Ilić
- Saša Kovačević
- Pavle Ninkov
- Milan Obradović
- Dejan Rađenović
- Miroslav Savić
- Jovan Stanković
- Dejan Stefanović
- Branislav Trajković

- (Bosnia and Herzegovina) Nenad Mišković
- (North Macedonia) Aleksandar Todorovski
- (Montenegro) Dejan Damjanović
- (Montenegro) Milan Jovanović
- (Montenegro) Mitar Novaković
- (Ukraine) Marko Dević

For the list of clubs present and former players with Wikipedia article, please see: Category:FK Radnički Beograd players.

== Stadium ==
The main field is located within the Sports complex of Radnički Belgrade which is composed of one main football ground supported by 5 training grounds and a clay pitch. There are projects of expansion currently under way.

== Football academy ==
The club works with all levels of youth football, starting with under-11 until the under-17. The club has long been dedicated to the work with the young.
