= Milan Ljubenović =

Serbian footballer

Milan Zarije Ljubenović
Personal information
- Full name: Milan Zarije Ljubenović
- Date of birth: 30 January 1932
- Place of birth: Novi Sad, Kingdom of Yugoslavia
- Date of death: 28 August 1989 (aged 57)
- Position: Defender

Senior career*
Years	Team	Apps	(Gls)
1949–1961	Radnički Beograd	170	(0)

International career
1954–1955	Yugoslavia	4	(0)
- * Club domestic league appearances and goals

Milan Zarije Ljubenović (Serbian Cyrillic: Милан Зарије Љубеновић; 30 January 1932 – 28 August 1989) was a Serbian footballer.

== Biography ==
Born in Novi Sad, Kingdom of Yugoslavia, he played with FK Radnički Beograd between 1949 and 1961. After playing in the Yugoslav Second League during the initial seasons, they earned promotion in 1953, having played with the club in the Yugoslav First League until his retirement in 1961. For Radnički he played over 500 matches, of which 170 were in the First League. Known for being a discrete working player on the field, he begin playing as right-winger becoming with time the pillar of the defence.

In 1954 he made his debut in the Yugoslavia national team having played a total of 4 matches until 1955.

He was graduated in stomatology.
