= Mile Tomić =

Serbian football manager and player

Personal information
- Date of birth: 17 March 1954 (age 72)
- Place of birth: Belgrade, PR Serbia, FPR Yugoslavia
- Position: Defender

Youth career
- Galenika Zemun

Senior career*
Years	Team	Apps	(Gls)
1973–1977	Galenika Zemun		
1977–1981	Radnički Pirot		
1981–1984	Galenika Zemun		

Managerial career
- 1984–1986: Zemun (assistant)
- 1986–1988: Zemun
- 1991–1992: Zemun (assistant)
- 1992–1994: Zemun
- 1994: Obilić
- 1996–1997: Radnički Pirot
- 1997: Radnički Niš
- 1998–1999: Zemun
- 2000–2002: FR Yugoslavia U19
- 2002–2003: FR Yugoslavia (assistant)
- 2003–2004: Železnik
- 2012–2013: Radnički Pirot
- 2013: Dolina Padina
- 2013–2014: Smederevo
- 2014–2015: Sutjeska Nikšić
- * Club domestic league appearances and goals

Mile Tomić (Serbian Cyrillic: Миле Томић; born 17 March 1954) is a Serbian former football manager and player.

== Playing career ==
Tomić spent most of his career at his parent club Galenika Zemun. He also played for Radnički Pirot between 1977 and 1981.

== Managerial career ==
Tomić served as manager of Zemun on several occasions. He also worked as manager of Železnik, securing a spot in the 2004–05 UEFA Cup.

As FR Yugoslavia U19 manager, Tomić led the team to the semi-finals of the 2001 UEFA European Under-18 Championship.
