= Aleksandar Petaković =

Yugoslav and Serbian football manager and player (1930–2011)

Personal information
- Full name: Aleksandar Petaković
- Date of birth: 6 February 1930
- Place of birth: Belgrade, Kingdom of Yugoslavia
- Date of death: 12 April 2011 (aged 81)
- Place of death: Kraljevo, Serbia
- Height: 1.75 m (5 ft 9 in)
- Position: Forward

Senior career*
Years	Team	Apps	(Gls)
1950–1961	Radnički Beograd	188	(96)
1961–1962	Lille	28	(11)
1962–1963	Standard Liège	3	(1)
1963–1965	Fortuna '54	50	(12)
Total		269	(120)

International career
1954–1959	Yugoslavia	19	(8)

Managerial career
- 1965–1967: Sloga Kraljevo
- 1967–1968: Vefa
- 1968–1969: İzmirspor
- 1973–1974: Sloga Kraljevo
- 1974: Sloga Kraljevo
- 1978–1980: Sloga Kraljevo
- * Club domestic league appearances and goals

Aleksandar Petaković (Serbian Cyrillic: Александар Петаковић; 6 February 1930 – 12 April 2011) was a Yugoslav and Serbian football manager and player.

== Club career ==
Petaković started out at Radnički Beograd, helping the club win promotion from the Yugoslav Third League to the Yugoslav First League. He amassed over 150 appearances and scored more than 80 goals in the top flight during the course of eight seasons (1953–1961). After moving abroad, Petaković played for several years in France (Lille), Belgium (Standard Liège), and the Netherlands (Fortuna '54).

== International career ==
At international level, Petaković was capped 19 times for Yugoslavia between 1954 and 1959, scoring eight goals including a hat-trick in a 5–0 friendly win over England in May 1958. He was also part of the team in two World Cups (1954 and 1958).

== Managerial career ==
Soon after hanging up his boots, Petaković started his managerial career at Sloga Kraljevo, taking over in October 1965. He spent two seasons in charge and led the club to promotion to the Yugoslav Second League in his final year. Subsequently, Petaković moved to Turkey, having spells as manager with Vefa (1967–68) and İzmirspor (1968–69).

== Career statistics ==
=== Club ===
Appearances and goals by club, season and competition
Club	Season	League		
Club	Season	Division	Apps	Goals
Radnički Beograd	1950	Yugoslav Third League		
Radnički Beograd	1951	Yugoslav Second League	25	13
Radnički Beograd	1952	Serbian Republic League		
Radnički Beograd	1952–53	Serbian Republic League		
Radnički Beograd	1953–54	Yugoslav First League	18	14
Radnički Beograd	1954–55	Yugoslav First League	24	11
Radnički Beograd	1955–56	Yugoslav First League	25	16
Radnički Beograd	1956–57	Yugoslav First League	22	5
Radnički Beograd	1957–58	Yugoslav First League	21	13
Radnički Beograd	1958–59	Yugoslav First League	18	10
Radnički Beograd	1959–60	Yugoslav First League	16	6
Radnički Beograd	1960–61	Yugoslav First League	19	8
Radnički Beograd	Total		188	96

=== International ===
Appearances and goals by national team and year
National team	Year	Apps	Goals
Yugoslavia	1954	4	0
Yugoslavia	1955	0	0
Yugoslavia	1956	3	1
Yugoslavia	1957	2	1
Yugoslavia	1958	8	6
Yugoslavia	1959	2	0
Total		19	8

== Honours ==
Radnički Beograd

- Yugoslav Second League: 1951
- Yugoslav Third League: 1950
