= Đorđe Koković =

Serbian football manager and player

Personal information
- Full name: Đorđe Koković
- Date of birth: 7 December 1953 (age 72)
- Place of birth: Titovo Užice, PR Serbia, FPR Yugoslavia
- Height: 1.78 m (5 ft 10 in)
- Position: Forward

Youth career
- Sloga Kraljevo

Senior career*
Years	Team	Apps	(Gls)
1971–1975	Sloga Kraljevo		
1975–1976	Mladi Radnik		
1976–1979	Rad	93	(17)
1980	Philadelphia Fury	26	(2)
1981	Sloboda Titovo Užice	10	(1)
1981–1983	Sloga Kraljevo		

Managerial career
- 1987: Sloga Kraljevo
- 1988–1990: Sloga Kraljevo
- 2000: Shandong Luneng (caretaker)
- 2007: Sloga Kraljevo
- 2010–2011: Africa Sports
- * Club domestic league appearances and goals

Đorđe "Đoko" Koković (Serbian Cyrillic: Ђорђе Ђоко Коковић; born 7 December 1953) is a Serbian former football manager and player.

== Playing career ==
After coming through the youth system of Sloga Kraljevo, Koković made his senior debut for the club in the Yugoslav Second League in early 1971. He later spent three-and-a-half years with fellow Second League side Rad in the late 1970s. Subsequently, Koković moved to the United States and played for the Philadelphia Fury of the North American Soccer League in the 1980 season. He finished his playing career with Sloga Kraljevo in the fall of 1983.

== Managerial career ==
After hanging up his boots, Koković was manager of Sloga Kraljevo on several occasions. He also served as caretaker manager of Chinese Jia-A League side Shandong Luneng in the latter part of the 2000 season. Between 2010 and 2011, Koković was taking charge of Ivorian club Africa Sports.

== Personal life ==
Koković is the father of fellow footballer Radomir Koković.
