= Ljubomir Ognjanović =

Serbian footballer

Personal information
- Date of birth: 21 October 1933
- Place of birth: Belgrade, Kingdom of Yugoslavia
- Date of death: 28 May 2008 (aged 74)
- Position: Forward

Senior career*
Years	Team	Apps	(Gls)
1952–1967	Radnički Beograd		

International career
1958	Yugoslavia	1	(0)
- * Club domestic league appearances and goals

Ljubomir Ognjanović (Serbian Cyrillic: Љубомир Огњановић; 21 October 1933 – 28 May 2008) was a Serbian football player.

== Club career ==
Born in Belgrade, Kingdom of Yugoslavia, he played his entire career with FK Radnički Beograd as a forward. He was part of the club between 1952 and 1967. After playing the first two seasons in the Yugoslav Second League, he was part of the team that won promotion to the Yugoslav First League in 1953. He played 198 matches and scored 18 goals in the top league until 1961, when FK Radnički was relegated not to be promoted again until Ognjanović retired in 1967.

== International career ==
He played one match for the Yugoslavia national team in 1958, in a friendly match against Hungary.
