= Milorad Milutinović =

Serbian football player and manager

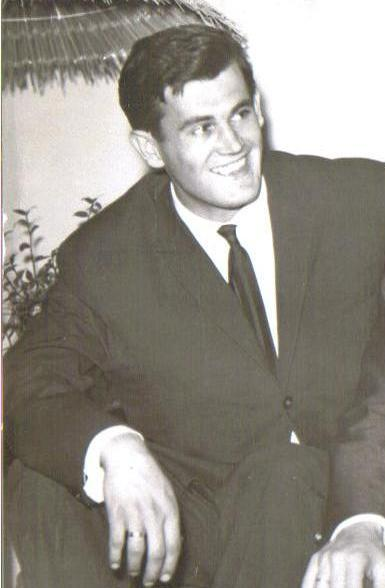

Personal information
- Full name: Milorad Obrad Milutinović
- Date of birth: 10 March 1935
- Place of birth: Bajina Bašta, Kingdom of Yugoslavia
- Date of death: 12 July 2015 (aged 80)
- Place of death: La Chaux-de-Fonds, Switzerland
- Position: Defender

Youth career
- 1948–1951: Bor

Senior career*
Years	Team	Apps	(Gls)
1952–1958	Partizan	42	(1)
1958–1960	OFK Belgrade	16	(0)
1960–1963	Partizan	19	(0)
1963–1965	Bor		
1965–1968	La Chaux-de-Fonds	56	(3)
1968	Neuchâtel Xamax	7	(0)

Managerial career
- 1968–1969: Neuchâtel Xamax
- * Club domestic league appearances and goals

Milorad Milutinović (Serbian Cyrillic: Милорад Mилутинoвић; 10 March 1935 – 12 July 2015) was a Serbian football player and manager.

== Career ==
Like his two brothers Miloš and Bora, Milorad played with Partizan Belgrade as defender in the 1950s and 1960s, playing a total of 194 games and scoring 9 goals. With Belgrade, he won the Yugoslav First League three times: in 1960-61, 1961-62 and 1962-63.

He was part of the Yugoslav squad at the 1958 FIFA World Cup, but did not play, and ended his career with no national team caps.

After ending his playing career, he became a football manager. He was the manager of Neuchâtel Xamax between 1968 and 1969.
