= Saša Nikolić =

Serbian football manager and player

Personal information
- Date of birth: 30 April 1964 (age 62)
- Place of birth: Slovenj Gradec, SR Slovenia, SFR Yugoslavia
- Position: Goalkeeper

Youth career
- Dinamo Zagreb

Senior career*
Years	Team	Apps	(Gls)
- Zvezdara
1988–1989	Čelik Zenica	2	(0)
- Rudar Kakanj
1991–1993	Železničar Beograd		
1993–1998	Železnik		

Managerial career
- Železnik (assistant)
- 2002–2003: Železnik
- 2004: Henan Jianye
- 2004: Železnik
- 2006–2007: Serbia U17
- 2007–2008: Napredak Kruševac
- 2008: Banat Zrenjanin
- 2009: Sloga Kraljevo
- 2010: Inđija
- 2011: Lokomotiv Plovdiv
- 2011–2012: Bežanija
- 2013–2014: Radnik Surdulica
- 2015–2016: Loznica
- 2017–2019: Angola (assistant)
- * Club domestic league appearances and goals

Saša Nikolić (Serbian Cyrillic: Саша Николић; born 30 April 1964) is a Serbian football manager and former player.

== Playing career ==
After starting out at Dinamo Zagreb, Nikolić went on to play for Čelik Zenica during the 1988–89 Yugoslav First League. He lastly played for Železnik in the First League of FR Yugoslavia, before hanging up his boots.

== Managerial career ==
After serving as an assistant at Železnik, Nikolić took over as the club's manager in May 2002, replacing Goran Stevanović. He quickly proved his talent and was voted the best manager in FR Yugoslavia for 2002 in a poll organized by Politika. In August 2003, Nikolić parted ways with the club. He then moved abroad to China and briefly managed Henan Jianye, before returning to Železnik as manager in November 2004. During the second part of the 2004–05 season, Nikolić served as the club's sporting director.

Later on, Nikolić managed numerous clubs, including Napredak Kruševac (October 2007–June 2008), Banat Zrenjanin (July–December 2008), Sloga Kraljevo (September–December 2009), Inđija (October–December 2010), Lokomotiv Plovdiv (April–June 2011), Bežanija (October 2011–April 2012), Radnik Surdulica (September 2013–April 2014), and Loznica (December 2015–June 2016).

From 2017 to 2019, Nikolić served as an assistant to compatriot Srđan Vasiljević with the Angola national team.
