= Đorđije Ćetković =

Montenegrin footballer

Personal information
- Full name: Đorđije Ćetković
- Date of birth: 3 January 1983 (age 43)
- Place of birth: Titograd, SR Montenegro, Yugoslavia
- Height: 1.79 m (5 ft 10 in)
- Position: Midfielder

Team information
- Current team: Partizan (assistant)

Senior career*
Years	Team	Apps	(Gls)
1999–2000	Crvena Stijena		
2000–2002	Budućnost Podgorica	47	(8)
2002–2003	Čukarički	21	(3)
2003–2005	Železnik	33	(5)
2005	Voždovac	6	(1)
2006–2008	Hansa Rostock	67	(12)
2009	VfL Osnabrück	3	(0)
2009	Budućnost Podgorica	15	(5)
2010	Bnei Sakhnin	8	(0)
2010	Győr	5	(0)
2011	Zeta	9	(1)
2012	Kastrioti	11	(4)
2012	Buriram United		
2013	Sutjeska Nikšić	16	(4)
2013	Bežanija	9	(1)
2014	Kahramanmaraşspor	8	(0)
2016	Kom		
2016	Jedinstvo Bijelo Polje	1	(0)
Total		259	(44)

International career
2007–2008	Montenegro	3	(0)

Managerial career
- 2021–2022: Partizan U15
- 2022–2024: Partizan U17
- 2024–: Partizan (assistant)
- * Club domestic league appearances and goals

Đorđije Ćetković (Cyrillic: Ђорђије Ћетковић; born 3 January 1983) is a Montenegrin retired footballer who played as a midfielder. He played three times for the Montenegro national team.

== Club career ==
Born in Titograd, Montenegro (now Podgorica, Montenegro), Ćetković began playing at a minor Montenegrin club, FK Crvena Stijena, from where he moved to FK Budućnost Podgorica. His good performance brought him offers from clubs, but he decided to stay in the domestic league, this time in Serbia for Belgrade's clubs FK Čukarički and FK Železnik.

In January 2006, he moved to German club FC Hansa Rostock. On 15 December 2008, he was released together with teammate Dexter Langen. He signed on 8 January 2009 a contract with VfL Osnabrück and was demoted to the reserve team on 14 April 2009.

In summer 2009, Ćetković returned to Budućnost Podgorica. In January 2010, he was released by Budućnost. In the same month, he joined Bnei Sakhnin from the Israeli Premier League. In summer 2010, he moved to the Hungarian side Győri ETO. In February 2012, Ćetković signed with Albanian club KS Kastrioti. In summer 2012, he signed with Thai club Buriram United. He finished the 2012–13 season playing with FK Sutjeska Nikšić in the Montenegrin First League, and in summer 2013 he returned to Serbia this time to play with second-level club FK Bežanija.

== International career ==
Ćetković made his debut for Montenegro in a June 2007 Kirin Cup match against hosts Japan and has earned a total of 3 caps, scoring no goals. His final international was a November 2008 friendly match against Macedonia.

== Personal life ==
Ćetković is the nephew of the famous Montenegrin footballer, Predrag Mijatović, and brother of Marko Ćetković.

== Honours ==
=== Player ===
Buriram United

- Thai FA Cup Champion: 2012

Sutjeska Nikšić

- Montenegrin First League Champion: 2012–13

=== Coach ===
Partizan U17

- Serbian Champion: 2022–23
