= 1956–57 Yugoslav First League =

Prva savezna liga
- Season: 1956–57
- Dates: 5 August 1956 – 23 June 1957
- Champions: Red Star (4th title)
- Relegated: FK Sarajevo; Lokomotiva
- European Cup: Red Star
- Top goalscorer: Todor Veselinović (28)

The 1956–57 season was the 11th season of the Yugoslav First League (Serbo-Croatian: Prva savezna liga, lit. 'First Federal League'), the top level association football league of SFR Yugoslavia, since its establishment in 1946. Fourteen teams contested the competition, with Red Star winning their fourth title.

The season featured an unusually long four-month winter break — from 28 October 1956 until 3 March 1957 — during which the Yugoslav Olympic national team, which entirely consisted of players from the Yugoslav First League, participated at the 1956 Melbourne Olympics and won the silver medal.

== Teams ==
At the end of the previous season Željezničar and Proleter Osijek were relegated from top level. They were replaced by Lokomotiva and Vardar.

Team	Location	Federal Republic	Position in 1955–56
BSK	Belgrade	SR Serbia	10th
Budućnost	Titograd	SR Montenegro	11th
Dinamo Zagreb	Zagreb	SR Croatia	4th
Hajduk Split	Split	SR Croatia	12th
Lokomotiva	Zagreb	SR Croatia	—N/a
Partizan	Belgrade	SR Serbia	2nd
Radnički Belgrade	Belgrade	SR Serbia	3rd
Red Star	Belgrade	SR Serbia	1st
FK Sarajevo	Sarajevo	SR Bosnia and Herzegovina	6th
Spartak Subotica	Subotica	SR Serbia	9th
Vardar	Skopje	SR Macedonia	—N/a
Velež	Mostar	SR Bosnia and Herzegovina	7th
Vojvodina	Novi Sad	SR Serbia	5th
NK Zagreb	Zagreb	SR Croatia	8th

== League table ==
Pos	Team	Pld	W	D	L	GF	GA	GR	Pts	Qualification or relegation
1	Red Star Belgrade (C)	26	17	5	4	66	23	2.870	39	Qualification for European Cup preliminary round
2	Vojvodina	26	16	3	7	64	38	1.684	35	
3	Hajduk Split	26	12	6	8	45	31	1.452	30	
4	Partizan	26	10	6	10	51	45	1.133	26	
5	Dinamo Zagreb	26	10	6	10	51	51	1.000	26	
6	BSK (Note: After this season, BSK changed their name to OFK Belgrade, in an attempt to appeal to the rising numbers of fans in the younger generation.)	26	9	7	10	41	47	0.872	25	
7	NK Zagreb	26	9	7	10	39	45	0.867	25	
8	Radnički Beograd	26	8	7	11	41	47	0.872	23	
9	Budućnost	26	9	5	12	38	47	0.809	23	
10	Velež	26	9	5	12	44	57	0.772	23	
11	Vardar	26	9	5	12	30	44	0.682	23	
12	Spartak Subotica	26	7	8	11	44	46	0.957	22	
13	Sarajevo (R)	26	9	4	13	38	52	0.731	22	Relegation to Yugoslav Second League
14	Lokomotiva Zagreb (R)	26	10	2	14	44	63	0.698	22	Relegation to Yugoslav Second League

Source: rsssf.org
Rules for classification: 1st points; 2nd goal average
(C) Champions; (R) Relegated

== Results ==
Home \ Away	BUD	BSK	DIN	HAJ	LOK	PAR	RBE	RSB	SAR	SPA	VAR	VEL	VOJ	ZAG
Budućnost		3–0	0–3	1–0	6–3	2–2	1–0	2–2	1–0	2–0	1–0	1–1	0–2	2–0
BSK	5–2		1–1	2–0	3–0	1–3	0–1	1–4	2–2	4–1	0–0	1–0	4–1	3–2
Dinamo Zagreb	2–1	3–3		1–2	5–1	4–3	3–1	3–2	0–1	0–0	4–1	1–4	5–4	2–1
Hajduk Split	5–1	3–1	3–0		2–1	0–2	2–0	2–2	1–1	2–2	2–0	0–0	1–0	5–0
Lokomotiva Zagreb	3–2	1–2	3–3	1–0		3–0	0–8	1–0	4–3	3–1	5–0	5–2	0–2	0–1
Partizan	1–2	5–2	2–0	1–1	2–0		0–0	1–0	3–1	3–1	2–3	7–1	1–1	2–5
Radnički Beograd	3–2	1–1	4–2	0–5	1–2	3–1		1–1	3–1	3–1	1–2	3–2	0–6	1–1
Red Star	5–3	2–0	1–0	3–0	0–1	2–0	3–1		2–0	1–0	2–2	6–1	4–0	6–0
Sarajevo	1–0	4–0	1–2	3–1	5–3	1–4	2–2	0–4		2–2	0–1	2–0	2–1	2–1
Spartak Subotica	3–1	1–2	1–1	1–1	4–0	3–2	2–2	1–1	5–1		4–0	2–1	1–2	0–0
Vardar	1–1	1–0	2–1	4–1	4–0	1–1	2–1	0–2	0–1	1–5		0–0	1–2	3–1
Velež	3–1	2–2	4–2	1–3	3–1	3–1	4–1	0–2	4–2	4–1	1–0		1–1	0–1
Vojvodina	2–0	4–1	3–1	3–2	2–1	5–2	0–0	1–2	2–0	5–2	4–1	6–0		2–4
NK Zagreb	0–0	0–0	2–2	0–1	2–2	0–0	1–0	2–7	4–0	2–0	2–0	5–2	2–3	

Source: DataSoccer.it
Legend: Blue = home team win; Yellow = draw; Red = away team win.

== Top scorers ==
Rank	Player	Club	Goals
1	(Socialist Federal Republic of Yugoslavia) Todor Veselinović	Vojvodina	28
2	(Socialist Federal Republic of Yugoslavia) Bora Kostić	Red Star	27
3	(Socialist Federal Republic of Yugoslavia) Tihomir Ognjanov	Spartak Subotica	18
4	(Socialist Federal Republic of Yugoslavia) Zoran Prljinčević	Radnički Belgrade	17
5	(Socialist Federal Republic of Yugoslavia) Dionizije Dvornić	NK Zagreb	15
6	(Socialist Federal Republic of Yugoslavia) Vladimir Zelenika	Velež	14
7	(Socialist Federal Republic of Yugoslavia) Sava Antić	BSK	13
7	(Socialist Federal Republic of Yugoslavia) Živko Josić	BSK	13
9	(Socialist Federal Republic of Yugoslavia) Anton Rudinski	Red Star	12
9	(Socialist Federal Republic of Yugoslavia) Radivoj Ognjanović	Radnički Belgrade	12
9	(Socialist Federal Republic of Yugoslavia) Mladen Krgin	Budućnost	12
9	(Socialist Federal Republic of Yugoslavia) Dobrivoje Živkov	Sarajevo	12

== See also ==
- 1956–57 Yugoslav Second League
- 1956–57 Yugoslav Cup
