= 2004–05 Serbia and Montenegro Cup =

Tournament details
- Country: Serbia and Montenegro
- Teams: 32

Final positions
- Champions: Železnik
- Runners-up: Red Star

Tournament statistics
- Matches played: 31
- Goals scored: 68 (2.19 per match)

The 2004–05 Serbia and Montenegro Cup was the third season of the Serbia and Montenegro's annual football cup. The cup defenders was Red Star Belgrade, but was defeated by FK Železnik in the final.

== First round ==
Thirty-two teams entered in the First Round. The matches were played on 20, 22, 29 September, 6 and 20 October 2004.

| Team 1 | Score | Team 2 |
|---|---|---|
| Šumadija 1903 (III) | 1–2 | Zeta |
| Budućnost Podgorica | 3–1 | Borac Čačak |
| Sutjeska | 0–1 | Čukarički |
| Partizan | 4–1 | Radnički Beograd |
| Smederevo | 1–0 | Jedinstvo Ub (II) |
| Radnički Pirot (III) | 1–0 | Hajduk Kula |
| Crvena Stijena (III) | 1–0 | Zemun |
| Napredak (II) | 0–3 | Rad (II) |
| Javor (II) | 1–1 (3–2 p) | Radnički Obrenovac (II) |
| Big Bull (III) | 1–2 | Kom (II) |
| ČSK Čelarevo (III) | 1–2 | Budućnost Banatski Dvor (II) |
| Radnički Niš (II) | 0–1 | Železnik |
| Novi Sad (II) | 1–1 (5–6 p) | Vojvodina |
| OFK Beograd | 2–1 | Mladi Radnik (III) |
| Mokra Gora (V) | 1–5 | Obilić |
| Mladost Apatin (II) | 0–1 | Red Star |

Note: Roman numerals in brackets denote the league tier the clubs participated in the 2004–05 season.

== Second round ==
The 16 winners from the prior round enter this round. The matches were played on 26 and 27 October 2004.

| Team 1 | Score | Team 2 |
|---|---|---|
| Čukarički | 3–1 | Budućnost Banatski Dvor (II) |
| Vojvodina | 1–3 | Partizan |
| Zeta | 0–1 | Železnik |
| Budućnost Podgorica | 0–0 (1–3 p) | Smederevo |
| Red Star | 2–0 | Javor (II) |
| Obilić | 2–0 | Kom (II) |
| Rad (II) | 0–0 (5–4 p) | OFK Beograd |
| Crvena Stijena (III) | 1–1 (1–3 p) | Radnički Pirot (III) |

Note: Roman numerals in brackets denote the league tier the clubs participated in the 2004–05 season.

== Quarter-finals ==
The eight winners from the prior round enter this round. The matches were played on 10 November 2004.

| Team 1 | Score | Team 2 |
|---|---|---|
| Red Star | 2–1 | Smederevo |
| Partizan | 1–0 | Obilić |
| Železnik | 1–1 (3–2 p) | Čukarički |
| Radnički Pirot (III) | 0–1 | Rad (II) |

Note: Roman numerals in brackets denote the league tier the clubs participated in the 2004–05 season.

== Semi-finals ==
10 May 2005
16:30

| Železnik | 3–0 | Rad (II) |
|---|---|---|
| Milošević 6'; Novaković 71'; Ćetković 76' |

Železnik Stadium, Belgrade
Attendance: 3,000
Referee: Dejan Stanišić (Podgorica)
11 May 2005
17:00

| Red Star | 2–0 | Partizan |
|---|---|---|
| Žigić 10'; Krivokapić 90+3' | Report |

Red Star Stadium, Belgrade
Attendance: 10,000
Referee: Dragomir Tanović (Subotica)

Note: Roman numerals in brackets denote the league tier the clubs participated in the 2004–05 season.

== Final ==
24 May 2005
17:00

| Red Star | 0–1 | Železnik |
|---|---|---|
| | Report | Rađenović 90+1' |

Partizan Stadium, Belgrade
Attendance: 7,000
Referee: Darko Stojanović (Lazarevac)

== See also ==
- 2004–05 First League of Serbia and Montenegro
