= FK Železnik 1930 =

Serbian football club

Železnik
- Full name: Fudbalski Klub Železnik 1930
- Nickname: Lavovi (The Lions)
- Founded: 1930; 96 years ago
- Ground: Železnik Stadium
- Capacity: 6,900
- President: Jovan Bubonja
- League: Belgrade First League, Group A
- 2024–25: Belgrade Intermunicipal League – Group A, 2nd (promoted)
- Website: fkzeleznik.com
Home colours	Away colours

FK Železnik 1930 (Serbian Cyrillic: ФК Железник 1930) is a football club based in Železnik, Belgrade, Serbia. They compete in the Belgrade First League, the fifth tier of the national league system. The team plays its home games at the Železnik Stadium.

The club competed in the First League of Serbia and Montenegro from 1996 to 2005. They made their European debut in the 2004–05 UEFA Cup and went on to win the Serbia and Montenegro Cup later that season, before merging with FK Voždovac.

== History ==
Founded as Železnički SK on 28 May 1930, the club became more organized during the 1950s. They changed their name to FK Železnik in 1961, following a merger with FK Napredak, which was originally created by the Ivo Lola Ribar Institute. Between 1963 and 1967, the club competed in the Serbian League North, the third tier of Yugoslav football. They lost to Sloboda Užice in the promotion playoffs to the Yugoslav Second League in 1965.

2004–05 Serbia and Montenegro Cup winning squad

Old logo

The club continued to participate at regional level without notable achievements until 1993, when Jusuf "Jusa" Bulić acquired the club. They won the Serbian League North in the 1994–95 season and took promotion to the Second League of FR Yugoslavia. In the 1995–96 season, the club was promoted to the First League of FR Yugoslavia (I/B League). They finished second in the I/B League in the 1996–97 season, earning them a spot in the I/A League in the 1997–98 season.

After the assassination of his father, Dragan "Aca" Bulić took over the club in May 1998. Led by the youngest club president in the history of FR Yugoslavia football, they continued to progress rapidly, finishing in a higher league position every season. Simultaneously, the club reached the semi-finals of the national cup in two consecutive seasons in 2002 and 2003, but was eliminated by Sartid Smederevo on both occasions.

In the 2003–04 season, the club achieved its best league performance by finishing in third place, thus securing a spot in the 2004–05 UEFA Cup. They were eliminated by Romanian club Steaua București in the second qualifying round, losing 5–4 on aggregate. Despite only finishing ninth in the league that season, the club made the biggest success in its history by winning the Serbia and Montenegro Cup.

In June 2005, due to financial difficulties, the club was forced to withdraw its participation from the 2005–06 UEFA Cup. They eventually merged with another Belgrade-based club Voždovac, which continued to compete in the 2005–06 Serbia and Montenegro SuperLiga.

Refounded as FK Železnik Lavovi and later renamed FK Železnik Lasta , the club started competing in the Belgrade Third League, the seventh tier of Serbian football. They subsequently earned two promotions in two seasons, reaching the Belgrade First League in 2008. After three years in the fifth tier, the club gained promotion to the Belgrade Zone League in 2011. They subsequently secured promotion to the Serbian League Belgrade in 2012. After spending three seasons in the third tier, the club merged with Radnički Beograd in the summer of 2015. In 2020. they rejoined the league as FK Železnik 1930.

== Stadium ==
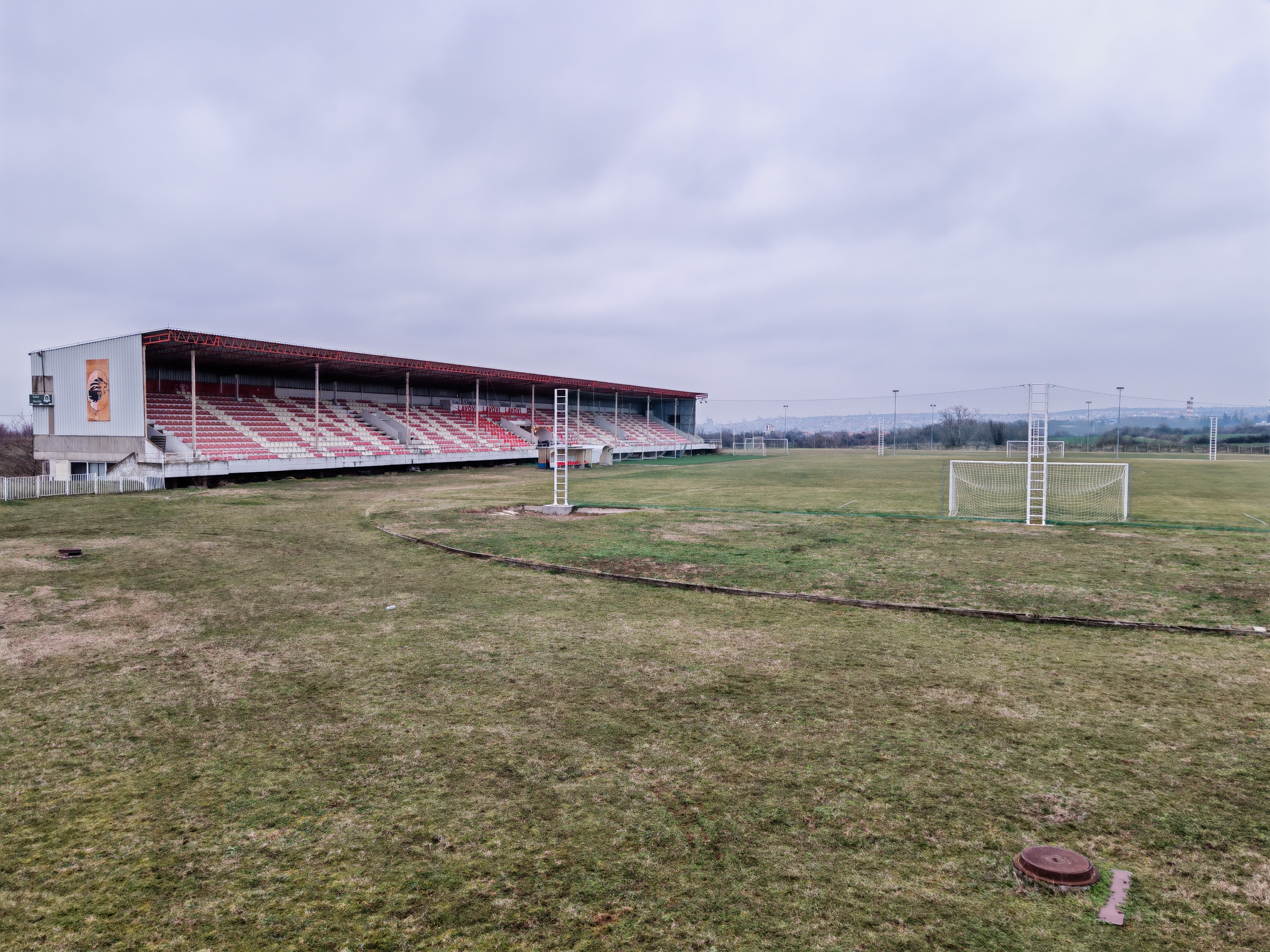
View on the west stand of Železnik Stadium from the entrance road, February 2026

The club plays its matches at Železnik Stadium, colloquially known as Mali Poljud, which has the total capacity of 6,900.

== Honours ==
=== League ===
- Serbian League North (Tier 3)
  - 1994–95
- Belgrade First League (Tier 5)
  - 2010–11
- Belgrade Second League (Tier 6)
  - 2007–08
- Belgrade Third League (Tier 7)
  - 2006–07 (Group A)

=== Cup ===
- Serbia and Montenegro Cup
  - 2004–05

== Recent league history ==
Season	Division	P	W	D	L	F	A	Pts	Pos
2020–21	6 - Belgrade Intermunicipal League – Group A	20	8	2	10	35	37	26	7th
2021–22	6 - Belgrade Intermunicipal League – Group A	26	11	6	9	48	46	39	8th
2022–23	6 - Belgrade Intermunicipal League – Group A	24	16	3	5	75	26	51	3rd
2023–24	6 - Belgrade Intermunicipal League – Group A	26	10	4	12	59	68	34	7th
2024–25	6 - Belgrade Intermunicipal League – Group A	28	24	3	1	156	16	75	2nd

== European record ==
Season	Competition	Round	Opponent	Score	Aggregate
2004–05	UEFA Cup	Second qualifying round	(Romania) Steaua București	2–4 (H), 2–1 (A)	4–5

== Notable players ==
This is a list of players who have played at full international level.

- (Azerbaijan) Branimir Subašić
- (Bulgaria) Zoran Janković
- (Montenegro) Đorđije Ćetković
- (Montenegro) Radomir Đalović
- (Montenegro) Dejan Damjanović
- (Montenegro) Milan Jovanović
- (Montenegro) Mitar Novaković
- (North Macedonia) Antonio Filevski
- (Serbia) Milan Biševac
- (Serbia) Jovan Damjanović
- (Serbia) Marko Lomić
- (Serbia and Montenegro) Ivan Dudić
- (Serbia and Montenegro) Aleksandar Jović
- (Serbia and Montenegro) Oliver Kovačević
- (Serbia and Montenegro) Saša Kovačević
- (Serbia and Montenegro) Nikola Lazetić
- (Serbia and Montenegro) Jovan Markoski
- (Serbia and Montenegro) Slobodan Marković
- (Serbia and Montenegro) Aleksandar Pantić
- (Serbia and Montenegro) Dejan Rađenović
- (Ukraine) Marko Dević

For a list of all FK Železnik players with a Wikipedia article, see Category:FK Železnik 1930 players.

== Historical list of coaches ==
- (Socialist Federal Republic of Yugoslavia) Ilija Lukić (1978-1979)
- (Serbia and Montenegro) Boško Đorđević
- (Bosnia and Herzegovina) Cvijetin Blagojević
- (Serbia and Montenegro) Aleksandar Trifunović
- (Croatia) Josip Duvančić (1996)
- (Serbia and Montenegro) Dževad Prekazi (1997)
- (Serbia and Montenegro) Baja Marić (1997–1998)
- (Serbia and Montenegro) Slobodan Dogandžić (1998–2000)
- (Serbia and Montenegro) Saša Milanović (2000)
- (Serbia and Montenegro) Dževad Prekazi (2000)
- (Serbia and Montenegro) Goran Milojević (2001)
- (Serbia and Montenegro) Goran Stevanović (2001–2002)
- (Serbia and Montenegro) Saša Nikolić (2002–2003)
- (Serbia and Montenegro) Mile Tomić (2003–2004)
- (Serbia and Montenegro) Branislav Novaković (2004)
- (Serbia and Montenegro) Saša Nikolić (2004)
- (Serbia and Montenegro) Miloljub Ostojić (2005)
- (Serbia and Montenegro) Čedomir Đoinčević (2005)
- (Serbia) Dejan Rađenović (2013-2015)
- (Serbia) Jovan Jovanović (2021)
- (Serbia) Đorđe Petrović (2022-2023)
- (Serbia) Nenad Matanović (2023)
