= 1992 Toulon Tournament squads =

The following is a list of the squads which competed in the 1992 Toulon Tournament

Players in boldface have been capped at full international level at some point in their career.

== Group A ==
=== France ===
Coach: (France) Marc Bourrier

No.	Pos.	Player	Date of birth (age)	Caps	Club
1	GK	**Richard Dutruel**	24 December 1972 (aged 19)		(France) Paris Saint-Germain
2	DF	**Lilian Thuram**	1 January 1972 (aged 20)		(France) Monaco
3	DF	Francis Llacer	9 September 1971 (aged 20)		(France) Paris Saint-Germain
4	DF	Serge Blanc	22 September 1972 (aged 19)		(France) Montpelier
5	MF	Stéphane Ziani	9 December 1971 (aged 20)		(France) Nantes
6	DF	Fabien Leclercq	19 October 1972 (aged 19)		(France) Lille
7	MF	Grégory Meilhac	5 August 1971 (aged 20)		(France) Nîmes
8	DF	Éric Rabésandratana	18 September 1972 (aged 19)		(France) Nancy
9	FW	**Christophe Dugarry**	24 March 1972 (aged 20)		(France) Bordeaux
10	FW	Benoît Chagnaud	2 October 1971 (aged 20)		(France) Le Havre
11	MF	Frédéric Johansen	13 October 1972 (aged 19)		(France) Mulhouse
12	DF	Erwan Manac'h	9 December 1971 (aged 20)		(France) Monaco
13	FW	**Nicolas Ouédec**	28 October 1972 (aged 19)		(France) Nantes
14	DF	Jean-François Soucasse	1 August 1972 (aged 19)		(France) Toulouse
15	FW	**Tony Vairelles**	10 April 1973 (aged 19)		(France) Nancy
16	GK	Laurent Weber	1 September 1972 (aged 19)		(France) Strasbourg
17	DF	Jean-Manuel Thetis	5 November 1971 (aged 20)		(France) Montpelier

- (N°18) *(N°19) *(N°20) *(N°21) *(N°22) *(N°23)

=== England ===
Coach: (England) Dave Sexton

No.	Pos.	Player	Date of birth (age)	Caps	Club
1	GK	**Ian Walker**	31 October 1971 (aged 20)		(England) Tottenham Hotspur
2	DF	**Ugo Ehiogu**	3 November 1972 (aged 19)		(England) Aston Villa
3	DF	Matt Jackson	19 October 1971 (aged 20)		(England) Everton
4	DF	Scott Minto	6 August 1971 (aged 20)		(England) Charlton Athletic
5	DF	Daryl Sutch	11 September 1971 (aged 20)		(England) Norwich City
6	DF	Ian Hendon	5 December 1971 (aged 20)		(England) Tottenham Hotspur
7	FW	Tommy Johnson	15 January 1971 (aged 21)		(England) Notts County
8	MF	**Ray Parlour**	7 March 1973 (aged 19)		(England) Arsenal
9	FW	**Andy Cole**	15 October 1971 (aged 20)		(England) Arsenal
10	FW	Bradley Allen	13 September 1971 (aged 20)		(England) Queens Park Rangers
11	FW	Paul Kitson	9 January 1971 (aged 21)		(England) Leicester City
12	MF	Craig Ramage	30 March 1970 (aged 22)		(England) Derby County
13	GK	**Andy Marriott**	11 October 1970 (aged 21)		(England) Burnley
14	FW	Neil Heaney	3 November 1971 (aged 20)		(England) Arsenal
15	FW	Mike Sheron	11 January 1972 (aged 20)		(England) Manchester City
16	FW	Richard Hall	14 March 1972 (aged 20)		(England) Southampton
17	FW	Lee Clark	27 August 1972 (aged 19)		(England) Newcastle United

- (N°18) *(N°19) *(N°20) *(N°21) *(N°22) *(N°23)

=== Mexico ===
Coach: (Argentina) Vicente Cayetano Rodríguez

No.	Pos.	Player	Date of birth (age)	Caps	Club
1	GK	José Alberto Guadarrama	8 May 1972 (aged 20)		(Mexico) Cruz Azul
2	DF	**Ricardo Cadena**	23 October 1969 (aged 22)		(Mexico) Guadalajara
3	DF	Silviano Delgado	4 September 1969 (aged 22)		(Mexico) Puebla
4	DF	**Manuel Vidrio**	23 August 1972 (aged 19)		(Mexico) Guadalajara
5	MF	Ángel Lemus	3 September 1971 (aged 20)		(Mexico) Necaxa
6	DF	José Pavez	13 October 1969 (aged 22)		(Mexico) Atlante
7	MF	José Agustín Morales	13 January 1971 (aged 21)		(Mexico) Cruz Azul
8	MF	**Joaquín Hernández**	1 February 1971 (aged 21)		(Mexico) América
9	FW	Pedro Pineda	30 November 1971 (aged 20)		(Mexico) Guadalajara
10	MF	**Camilo Romero**	30 March 1970 (aged 22)		(Mexico) Querétaro
11	FW	Mario Arteaga	29 November 1970 (aged 21)		(Mexico) Guadalajara
12	GK	Miguel Fuentes	29 September 1971 (aged 20)		(Mexico) Atlas
13	FW	Francisco Rotllán	12 January 1970 (aged 22)		(Mexico) Puebla
14	MF	Jorge Castañeda	12 January 1970 (aged 22)		(Mexico) Atlas
15	FW	**David Rangel**	12 November 1969 (aged 22)		(Mexico) Cruz Azul
16	MF	**Alberto Macías**	28 December 1969 (aged 22)		(Mexico) Toluca

- (N°17) *(N°18) *(N°19) *(N°20) *(N°21) *(N°22) *(N°23)

=== Czechoslovakia ===
Coach: (Czechoslovakia) Ivan Kopecký

No.	Pos.	Player	Date of birth (age)	Caps	Club
1	GK	**Jaromír Blažek**	29 December 1972 (aged 19)		(Czechoslovakia) Slavia Prague
2	DF	Roman Klimes	28 August 1972 (aged 19)		(Czechoslovakia) Bratislava
3	DF	Michal Kovář	8 September 1973 (aged 18)		(Czechoslovakia) Sigma Olomouc
4	DF	**Tomáš Řepka**	2 January 1974 (aged 18)		(Czechoslovakia) Baník Ostrava
5	DF	Peter Gunda	3 July 1973 (aged 18)		(Czechoslovakia) Nitra
6	MF	**Tomáš Galásek**	15 January 1973 (aged 19)		(Czechoslovakia) Baník Ostrava
7	MF	**Radek Bejbl**	29 August 1972 (aged 19)		(Czechoslovakia) Slavia Prague
8	MF	**Róbert Tomaschek**	25 August 1972 (aged 19)		(Czechoslovakia) Nitra
9	FW	**Štefan Rusnák**	7 August 1971 (aged 20)		(Czechoslovakia) Slavia Prague
10	MF	Zdemir Svoboda			(Czechoslovakia) Dukla Dejvice
11	MF	Jiří Skála	10 October 1973 (aged 18)		(Czechoslovakia) Viktoria Plzeň
12	MF	Robert Neumann	8 October 1972 (aged 19)		(Czechoslovakia) Bohemians 1905
13	FW	**Jozef Kožlej**	8 July 1973 (aged 18)		(Czechoslovakia) Tatran Prešov
14	DF	**Jiří Lerch**	17 October 1971 (aged 20)		(Czechoslovakia) Slavia Prague
15	FW	Péter Molnár	4 June 1973 (aged 18)		(Czechoslovakia) Dunajská Streda
16	GK	**Miroslav König**	1 June 1972 (aged 19)		(Czechoslovakia) Nitra

- (N°17) *(N°18) *(N°19) *(N°20) *(N°21) *(N°22) *(N°23)

== Group B ==
=== Scotland ===
Coach: (Scotland) Craig Brown

No.	Pos.	Player	Date of birth (age)	Caps	Club
12	GK	James Will	7 October 1972 (aged 19)		(England) Arsenal
1	GK	Chris Reid	4 November 1971 (aged 20)		(Scotland) Hibernian
2	DF	**Christian Dailly**	23 October 1973 (aged 18)		(Scotland) Dundee United
3	DF	Barry Smith	19 February 1974 (aged 18)		(Scotland) Celtic
5	DF	Darren Salton	16 March 1972 (aged 20)		(England) Luton Town
6	DF	Gary Bolan	24 March 1973 (aged 19)		(Scotland) Dundee United
14	DF	Grant Johnson	24 March 1972 (aged 20)		(Scotland) Dundee United
16	DF	Graeme Donald	14 April 1974 (aged 18)		(Scotland) Hibernian
17	DF	**Paul Bernard**	30 December 1972 (aged 19)		(England) Oldham Athletic
7	MF	**Craig Burley**	24 September 1971 (aged 20)		(England) Chelsea
11	MF	James Beattie	16 February 1973 (aged 19)		(Scotland) St. Mirren
4	MF	Darren Ferguson	9 February 1972 (aged 20)		(England) Manchester United
13	MF	Max Christie	7 November 1971 (aged 20)		(Scotland) Dundee
8	FW	**Paul Dickov**	1 November 1972 (aged 19)		(England) Arsenal
15	FW	**Scott Booth**	16 December 1971 (aged 20)		(Scotland) Aberdeen
10	FW	David Hagen	5 May 1973 (aged 19)		(Scotland) Rangers
9	FW	Andrew Roddie	4 November 1971 (aged 20)		(Scotland) Hibernian

=== United States ===
Coach: (Germany) Lothar Osiander

No.	Pos.	Player	Date of birth (age)	Caps	Club
1	GK	**Brad Friedel**	18 May 1971 (aged 21)		(United States) UCLA Bruins
13	GK	Trey Harrington	26 November 1970 (aged 21)		(United States) Evansville Purple Aces
2	DF	**Mike Burns**	14 September 1970 (aged 21)		(United States) US Soccer
3	DF	**Alexi Lalas**	1 July 1970 (aged 21)		(United States) US Soccer
14	DF	**Erik Imler**	1 June 1971 (aged 20)		(United States) Virginia Cavaliers
6	DF	**Mike Lapper**	28 August 1970 (aged 21)		(United States) UCLA Bruins
10	MF	**Manuel Lagos**	11 June 1971 (aged 20)		(United States) Milwaukee Panthers
7	MF	**Dario Brose**	27 January 1970 (aged 22)		(France) Stade Briochin
5	MF	**Claudio Reyna**	20 July 1973 (aged 18)		(United States) Virginia Cavaliers
8	MF	Michael Huwiler	4 January 1972 (aged 20)		(United States) Virginia Cavaliers
9	FW	Steven Snow	2 March 1971 (aged 21)		(Belgium) Standard Liege
11	MF	**Yari Allnutt**	30 March 1970 (aged 22)		(United States) San Diego Nomads
16	FW	**Dante Washington**	21 November 1970 (aged 21)		(United States) Radford Highlanders
12	FW	**Joe-Max Moore**	23 February 1971 (aged 21)		(United States) UCLA Bruins
15	FW	**Cobi Jones**	16 June 1970 (aged 21)		(Germany) FC Koln
4	DF	Curt Onalfo	30 March 1970 (aged 22)		(France) ES La Ciotat

- (N°17) *(N°18) *(N°19) *(N°20) *(N°21) *(N°22) *(N°23)

=== FR Yugoslavia (Federal Republic of Yugoslavia) ===
Coach: (Federal Republic of Yugoslavia) Milan Nikolić

No.	Pos.	Player	Date of birth (age)	Caps	Club
1	GK	**Željko Cicović**	2 September 1970 (aged 21)		(Federal Republic of Yugoslavia) Rad
12	GK	Željko Tadić	9 June 1974 (aged 17)		(Federal Republic of Yugoslavia) Radnički Niš
2	DF	Igor Taševski	27 July 1972 (aged 19)		(Federal Republic of Yugoslavia) Rad
3	DF	**Zoran Mirković**	21 September 1971 (aged 20)		(Federal Republic of Yugoslavia) Rad
4	DF	**Dražen Bolić**	12 September 1971 (aged 20)		(Federal Republic of Yugoslavia) Obilić
15	FW	Željko Petković			
6	MF	**Albert Nađ**	29 October 1974 (aged 17)		(Federal Republic of Yugoslavia) Partizan
9	FW	**Savo Milošević**	2 September 1973 (aged 18)		(Federal Republic of Yugoslavia) Partizan
14	DF	**Mitko Stojkovski**	18 December 1972 (aged 19)		(Federal Republic of Yugoslavia) Red Star Belgrade
11	FW	**Spira Grujić**	7 December 1971 (aged 20)		(Federal Republic of Yugoslavia) Radnički Niš
13	FW	Mirko Dimitrijević			
8	DF	Milenko Todorović			
5	DF	Srđan Bajčetić	7 November 1971 (aged 20)		(Federal Republic of Yugoslavia) Vojvodina
7	FW	Miladin Bečanović	18 April 1973 (aged 19)		(Federal Republic of Yugoslavia) Sutjeska Nikšić
16	FW	Sretko Vuksanović	15 February 1973 (aged 19)		(Bosnia and Herzegovina) Željezničar Sarajevo
10	FW	Nenad Bjeković	17 February 1974 (aged 18)		(Federal Republic of Yugoslavia) Partizan

- (N°17) *(N°18) *(N°19) *(N°20) *(N°21) *(N°22) *(N°23)

=== Portugal ===
Coach: (Portugal) Jesualdo Ferreira

No.	Pos.	Player	Date of birth (age)	Caps	Club
1	GK	Brassard	11 April 1972 (aged 20)		(Portugal) Maritimo
12	GK	Tomás	8 August 1971 (aged 20)		(Portugal) Chaves
2	DF	**Hélder Cristóvão**	21 March 1971 (aged 21)		(Portugal) Estoril
3	DF	**Jorge Costa**	14 October 1971 (aged 20)		(Portugal) Maritimo
4	DF	**Nelson**	5 November 1971 (aged 20)		(Portugal) Sporting CP
6	DF	**Abel Xavier**	30 November 1972 (aged 19)		(Portugal) Estrela da Amadora
5	MF	**Rui Costa**	29 March 1972 (aged 20)		(Portugal) Benfica
8	DF	Marinho	24 November 1970 (aged 21)		(Portugal) Benfica
10	MF	**Bino**	19 December 1972 (aged 19)		(Portugal) Rio Ave
7	FW	Miguel Bruno Pereira Cardoso	8 December 1971 (aged 20)		(Portugal) Farense
14	DF	Jorge Soares	22 August 1971 (aged 20)		(Portugal) Farense
11	MF	Luis Miguel	24 July 1972 (aged 19)		(Portugal) Gil Vicente
16	FW	Toni	2 August 1972 (aged 19)		(Portugal) F.C.Porto
15	FW	**Capucho**	21 February 1972 (aged 20)		(Portugal) Gil Vicente
9	FW	João Oliveira Pinto	3 August 1971 (aged 20)		(Portugal) Sporting CP
13	FW	Gil	2 December 1972 (aged 19)		(Portugal) AD Ovarense

- (N°17) *(N°18)
- (N°19) *(N°20) *(N°21) *(N°22) *(N°23)
