= 1992 Toulon Tournament =

Toulon Youth Festival

Tournament details
- Host country: France
- Dates: 24 May – 2 June
- Teams: 8 (from 2 confederations)

Final positions
- Champions: Portugal (1st title)
- Runners-up: Yugoslavia

Tournament statistics
- Matches played: 15
- Goals scored: 36 (2.4 per match)
- Top scorer: (Portugal) Rui Costa (4)
- Best player: (Portugal) Rui Costa

The 1992 Toulon Tournament was the 20th edition of the Toulon Tournament and began on 24 May and ended on 2 June 1992. England were the defending champions.

== Participant teams ==
- France
- Portugal
- Czechoslovakia
- (Serbia and Montenegro) FR Yugoslavia
- Mexico
- England
- Scotland
- United States

== Venues ==
The matches were played in these communes:

- Arles
- Aubagne
- Bormes-les-Mimosas
- Brignoles
- Fréjus
- La Ciotat
- La Seyne-sur-Mer
- Miramas
- Nice
- Six-Fours-les-Plages
- Saint-Cyr
- Sainte-Maxime
- Toulon
- Vitrolles

== Results ==
=== Group A ===
Team	Pld	W	D	L	GF	GA	GD	Pts	Qualification
France	3	2	1	0	5	0	+5	5	Advance to Semi-final
Mexico	3	1	1	1	4	6	−2	3	Advance to Semi-final
England	3	0	2	1	2	3	−1	2	
Czechoslovakia	3	1	0	2	3	5	−2	2	

Source: TT
1992-05-24

France	1–0	Czechoslovakia
Rabesandratana

1992-05-24

Mexico	1–1	England
Pineda		Allen

1992-05-26

France	4–0	Mexico
Dugarry; Ziani; Meilhac; Thuram

1992-05-26

England	1–2	Czechoslovakia
Kitson		Neumann; Lerch

1992-05-28

France	0–0	England

1992-05-28

Mexico	3–1	Czechoslovakia
Pineda; Castaneda		Rusnák

=== Group B ===
Team	Pld	W	D	L	GF	GA	GD	Pts	Qualification
Portugal	3	3	0	0	4	0	+4	6	Advance to Semi-final
(Serbia and Montenegro) FR Yugoslavia	3	2	0	1	4	1	+3	4	Advance to Semi-final
United States	3	1	0	2	5	5	0	2	
Scotland	3	0	0	3	0	7	−7	0	

Source: TT

All times local (CEST)

1992-05-25

Portugal	1–0	(Serbia and Montenegro) FR Yugoslavia
Hélder Cristóvão

1992-05-25

United States	5–0	Scotland
Snow; Reyna; Brose

1992-05-27

Portugal	1–0	Scotland
Rui Costa

1992-05-27

(Serbia and Montenegro) FR Yugoslavia	3–0	United States
Petković; Vuksanović

1992-05-29

Portugal	2–0	United States
João O. Pinto; Toni

1992-05-29

(Serbia and Montenegro) FR Yugoslavia	1–0	Scotland
Bečanović

== Knockout stage ==
=== Semifinals ===
31 May 1992

Portugal	5–1	Mexico
Capucho; João O. Pinto; Rui Costa		Rangel

31 May 1992

FR Yugoslavia (Serbia and Montenegro)	0–0	France
Penalties
	4–3

=== Final ===
2 June 1992

Portugal	2–1	(Serbia and Montenegro) FR Yugoslavia
Toni 26'; Gil 38'		Bečanović 60'

== Goal scorers ==
4 goals

- (Portugal) Rui Costa

3 goals

- (Mexico) Pineda
- (United States) Snow

2 goals

- (Portugal) Toni
- (Portugal) João Pinto
- (Serbia and Montenegro) Bečanović
- (Serbia and Montenegro) Petković

1 goal

- (Czech Republic) Lerch
- (Czech Republic) Neumann
- (Czech Republic) Rusnák
- (England) Allen
- (England) Kitson
- (France) Dugarry
- (France) Meilhac
- (France) Rabesandratana
- (France) Thuram
- (France) Ziani
- (Mexico) Castaneda
- (Mexico) Rangel
- (Portugal) Capucho
- (Portugal) Gil
- (Portugal) Hélder Cristóvão
- (United States) Brose
- (United States) Reyna
- (Serbia and Montenegro) Vuksanović
