= Ovos moles =

Portuguese confection made of egg yolks and sugar

Ovos moles de Aveiro
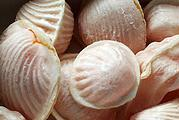
- Place of origin: Portugal
- Region or state: Aveiro
- Main ingredients: Egg yolks, sugar
- Other information: Certification: PGI (2006)

Ovos moles de Aveiro (literally, "soft eggs from Aveiro")—sometimes written as ovos-moles de Aveiro—are a local pastry delicacy from Aveiro District, Portugal, made of egg yolks and sugar, and sometimes chocolate. This mixture is then put inside a small spheroidal wafer capsule, shaped into nautical shapes such as shells.

In 2008, it was designated a product with Protected Geographical Indication by the European Union.

== History ==
Ovos moles are a traditional pastry of the Aveiro region. They trace their origin to the nuns who lived at various convents of the Dominican, Franciscan, and Carmelite orders present in the area until the early 20th century—particularly the Mosteiro de Jesus (Monastery of Jesus). According to popular legend, the nuns used egg whites to clean their habits, while they used the yolks to make sweets so as not to waste them, and in order to raise money for their religious communities. When the First Portuguese Republic suppressed the convents in 1910, the nuns transferred their artisanal knowledge to educated upper-class women. Ovos moles grew in popularity when women wearing traditional Aveiro costume started selling them at the Aveiro train station on the Lisbon–Porto line.

== Preparation ==
In order to make the egg yolk and sugar mixture for ovos moles, the yolks are carefully separated from the egg whites and mixed with about half their weight in sugar. The mixture is very smooth and creamy. It is not beat in a circular motion, which would result in undesirable striations, but in a simple back-and-forth or side-to-side motion with a wooden spoon. The mixture is then heated in a copper pan until the pan's bottom is visible.

The mixture is wrapped in a thin wafer casing made of rice starch or wheat flour similar to communion wafers. These casings are shaped into various nautical forms such as boats, clamshells, conches, fish, and shells. Sometimes the casings are passed through simple syrup in order to give them more consistency or turn them opaque.

Shops selling ovos moles usually display them in ceramic bowls or wood barrels painted with moliceiro boats and other motifs related to the Ria de Aveiro.

=== Chocolate ovos moles ===
Ovos moles made with 63% cocoa and covered in chocolate are a traditional variation on the pastry. They essentially became extinct during World War II due to chocolate's scarcity at the time. In December 2015 the Associação de Produtores de Ovos-Moles de Aveiro (Association of Producers of Aveiro Ovos-Moles) decided to reintroduce chocolate ovos moles and create a standard recipe for them. In Portuguese, chocolate ovos moles are called ovos moles de chocolate or ovos moles pretos (literally, black soft eggs).

== See also ==
- List of Portugal confectionery products with protected status
