= Ovar =

- Municipality
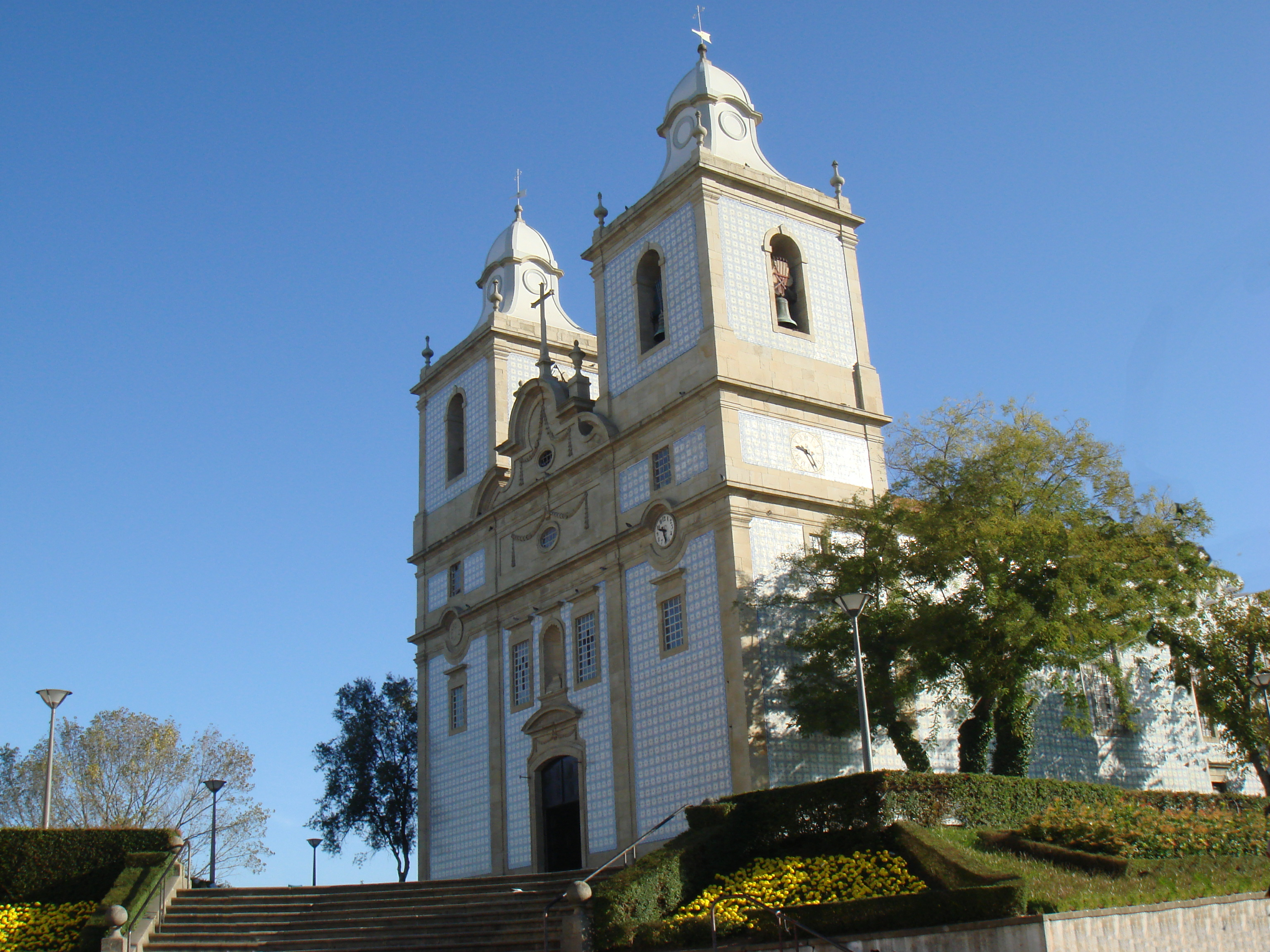
- Parish Church of Ovar

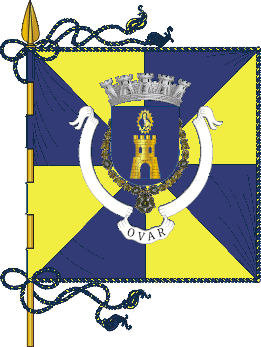
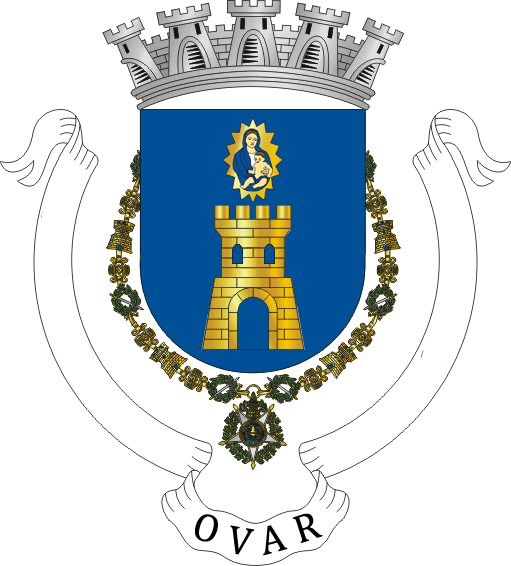
- Flag Coat of arms
- Interactive map of Ovar
- Coordinates: 40°52′N 8°38′W
- Country: Portugal
- Region: Centro
- Intermunic. comm.: Região de Aveiro
- District: Aveiro
- Parishes: 5

Government
  - President: Salvador Malheiro (PSD)

Area
  - Total: 23 km^{2} (8.9 sq mi)

Population (2011)
  - Total: 55,398
  - Density: 2,400/km^{2} (6,200/sq mi)
- Time zone: UTC+00:00 (WET)
  - Summer (DST): UTC+01:00 (WEST)
- Local holiday: Saint Christopher; 25 July
- Website: http://www.cm-ovar.pt

Ovar (Portuguese pronunciation: [ɔˈvaɾ] or [oˈvaɾ]) is a city and a municipality in Aveiro District, Baixo Vouga Subregion in Portugal. The population in 2011 was 55,398, in an area of 147.70 km^{2}. It had 42,582 eligible voters (2006). The municipality includes two cities: Ovar (16,849 inhabitants in 2001) and Esmoriz (11,020 inhabitants in 2001).

The present Mayor is Salvador Malheiro, elected by the Portuguese Social Democratic Party. The municipal holiday is 25 July.

The main beach area is Furadouro, and Ovar is located in the northern point of the Ria de Aveiro (Aveiro Lagoon)

== Demographics ==
Population of Ovar Municipality (1801 – 2011)
1801	1849	1900	1930	1960	1981	1991	2001	2008	2011
10 822	10 075	25 605	29 970	35 320	45 378	49 659	55 198	57 983	55 398

== Cities and towns ==
There are two cities and three towns in the municipality.

- Esmoriz (city)
- Ovar (city)
- Cortegaça (town)
- São João (town)
- Válega (town)
- Maceda (town)

== Parishes ==
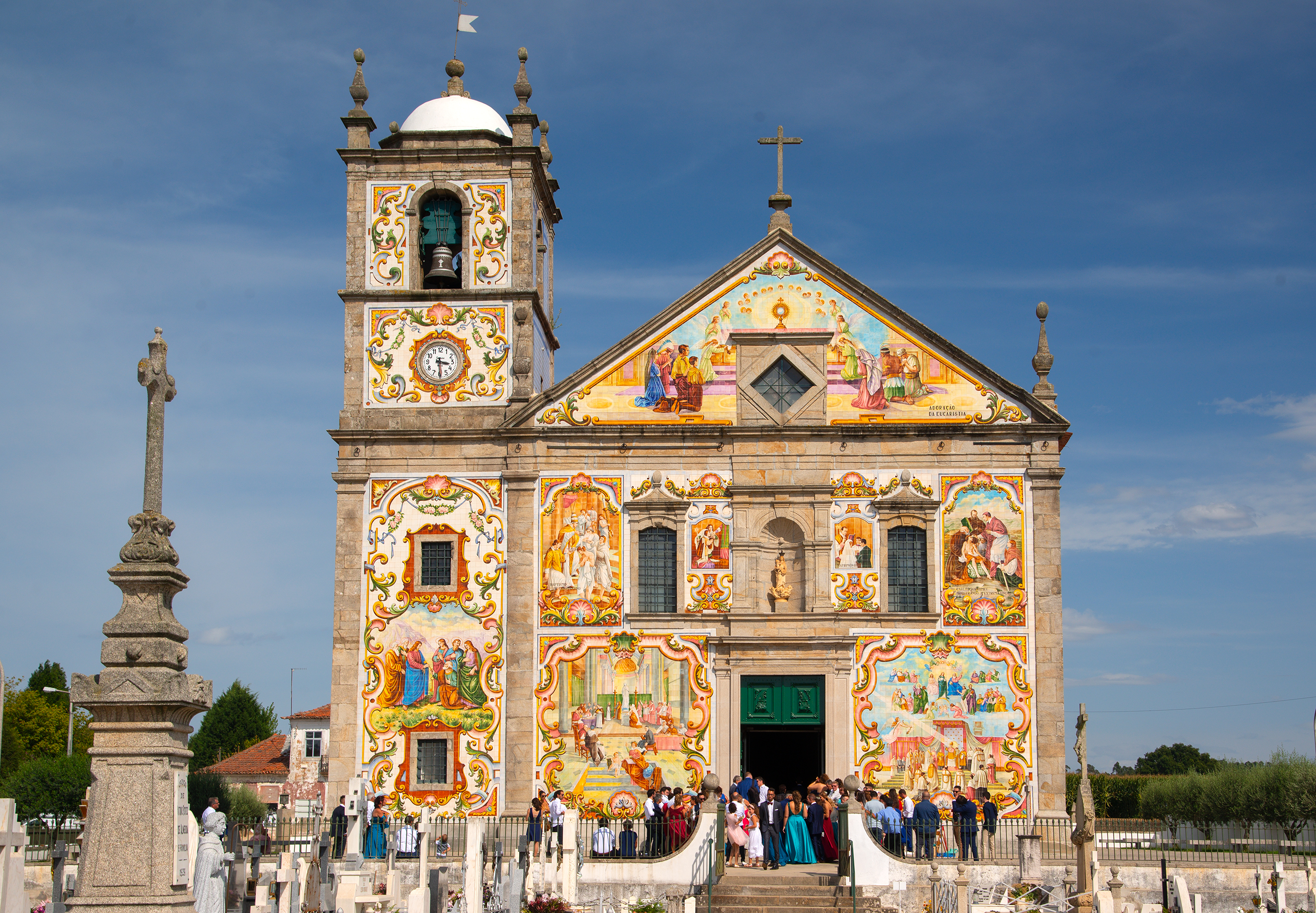
Parish church, Santa Maria de Válega, in Válega

Administratively, the municipality is divided into 5 civil parishes (freguesias):

- Cortegaça
- Esmoriz
- Maceda
- Ovar, São João, Arada e São Vicente de Pereira
- Válega

== Sport ==
Ovar is home to the football teams Ovarense, who play at the Estádio Marques da Silva, and Florgrade.

== Notable people ==
- Santa Camarão (1902–1968) a Portuguese boxer who was 2.02 m (6 ft 8 in) tall.
- Luís Filipe Menezes (born 1953) a Portuguese politician.
- Miguel Bruno (born 1971) a former Portuguese professional footballer with 286 club caps
- Clarisse Cruz (born 1978) a Portuguese 3000 metres steeplechase runner, competed in the 2008 Summer Olympics
- Edgar Sá (born 1979) a Portuguese retired footballer with 510 club caps
- Roberto Reis (born 1980) a Portuguese volleyball player
