= 1996–97 Real Madrid CF season =

95th season in existence of Real Madrid CF

Real Madrid
1996–97 season
- President: Lorenzo Sanz
- Head coach: Fabio Capello
- Stadium: Santiago Bernabéu
- La Liga: 1st
- Copa del Rey: Round of 16
- Top goalscorer: League: Davor Šuker (24); All: Davor Šuker (29)
Home colours	Away colours

The 1996–97 season was the Real Madrid CF's 66th season in La Liga. This article shows player statistics and official matches that the club played during the 1996–97 season. For the first time since 1977–78, Real Madrid was not involved in any European competitions due to the previous season's lowest league finish in 19 years.

== Summary ==
For the first time since the 1977–78 season, Real Madrid only played in the domestic competitions after having rejected the option to enter the 1996 Intertoto Cup. Madrid returned to domestic glory in the only season under the Fabio Capello's reign, who, after much conflict with club president Lorenzo Sanz, announced his exit already in mid-season, choosing to return to Italy (where he would eventually settle at his old club AC Milan). New signings Predrag Mijatović and Davor Šuker played alongside main striker Raúl González as well as Clarence Seedorf in midfield. Real Madrid was nearly on course to sign Newcastle United-bound Alan Shearer courtesy of his best form at Blackburn Rovers, but due to already featuring Raúl González as the club's main striker, Alan Shearer preferred to stay in England. Roberto Carlos, Carlos Secretário, Christian Panucci, and mid-season arrival Zé Roberto were also new signings in defense.

In May 1997, Real Madrid began to slip due to injuries of key players despite having won 3 of 5 matches in that month. However as rivals Barcelona also slipped in early June after a loss against Hércules, Real took an advantage by crushing CF Extremadura 5-0 in the same weekend. Real Madrid eventually won the La Liga title with a record 92 points, after a 3–1 victory against Atlético Madrid on the penultimate round of the season (five points ahead of Barcelona), and thus Fabio Capello became the first-ever Italian manager to win La Liga silverware. In the Copa del Rey, Madrid advanced to the round of 16 where they faced perennial rivals Barcelona, losing 4–3 on aggregate. The Catalans went on to win the tournament, setting up a Super Cup clash against Madrid.

== Players ==
=== Squad information ===
Note: Flags indicate national team as defined under FIFA eligibility rules; some limited exceptions apply. Players may hold more than one non-FIFA nationality.

No.	Pos.	Nation	Player
1	GK	ESP	Paco Buyo
2	DF	ESP	Chendo
3	DF	BRA	Roberto Carlos
4	DF	ESP	Fernando Hierro
5	DF	ESP	Manolo Sanchís
6	MF	ARG	Fernando Redondo
7	MF	ESP	Raúl
8	FW	YUG	Predrag Mijatović
9	FW	CRO	Davor Šuker
10	MF	NED	Clarence Seedorf
11	MF	ESP	José Amavisca
12	DF	POR	Carlos Secretário
13	GK	ESP	Santiago Cañizares

No.	Pos.	Nation	Player
14	MF	ESP	Luis Milla
15	DF	ESP	Fernando Sanz
17	DF	ITA	Christian Panucci
18	DF	ESP	Rafael Alkorta
19	DF	ESP	Mikel Lasa
20	FW	YUG	Dejan Petković
21	MF	BRA	Zé Roberto
21	DF	ESP	José García Calvo
23	MF	ESP	Guti
24	FW	ESP	Alvaro
25	GK	GER	Bodo Illgner
26	MF	ESP	Víctor
27	FW	ESP	Irurzun

=== Transfers ===
In
Pos.	Name	from	Type
FW	Predrag Mijatović	Valencia	€7,5 million
MF	Clarence Seedorf	Sampdoria	€4,8 million
FW	Davor Šuker	Sevilla	€3,6 million
DF	Roberto Carlos	Internazionale	€3,5 million
GK	Bodo Illgner	1. FC Köln	€1,2 million
DF	Carlos Secretário	Porto	€1,8 million
MF	Dejan Petkovic	Sevilla FC	loan ended

Out
Pos.	Name	To	Type
MF	Michael Laudrup	Vissel Kobe	
FW	Ivan Zamorano	Inter Milan	
MF	Míchel	Celaya	
MF	Freddy Rincón	Palmeiras	
FW	Juan Esnaider	Atlético Madrid	
MF	Luis Enrique	FC Barcelona	
DF	Sanchez Flores	Real Zaragoza	
DF	Miquel Soler	Real Zaragoza	
DF	Nando	Espanyol	
MF	Antonio Gomez	Sevilla FC	loan

==== Winter ====
In
Pos.	Name	from	Type
DF	Christian Panucci	AC Milan	€3,5 million
MF	Zé Roberto	Portuguesa	€2,5 million

Out
Pos.	Name	To	Type
DF	Carlos Secretario	Porto	
MF	Dejan Petkovic	Racing Santander	loan

== Competitions ==
=== La Liga ===
==== League table ====
Pos	Team	Pld	W	D	L	GF	GA	GD	Pts	Qualification or relegation
1	Real Madrid (C)	42	27	11	4	85	36	+49	92	Qualification for the Champions League group stage
2	Barcelona	42	28	6	8	102	48	+54	90	Qualification for the Champions League second qualifying round
3	Deportivo La Coruña	42	21	14	7	57	30	+27	77 (Note: BET 1–2 DEP; DEP 3–0 BET)	Qualification for the UEFA Cup first round
4	Real Betis	42	21	14	7	81	46	+35	77	Qualification for the Cup Winners' Cup first round (Note: Since Barcelona, winners of 1996–97 Copa del Rey, was qualified for the 1997–98 UEFA Champions League, losing cup finalists Real Betis earned a spot in the first round of the 1997–98 UEFA Cup Winners' Cup.)
5	Atlético Madrid	42	20	11	11	76	64	+12	71	Qualification for the UEFA Cup first round

Source: LFP
Rules for classification: 1) points; 2) head-to-head points; 3) head-to-head goal difference; 4) head-to-head goals scored; 5) goal difference; 6) number of goals scored.
(C) Champions

==== Results by round ====
Round	1	2	3	4	5	6	7	8	9	10	11	12	13	14	15	16	17	18	19	20	21	22	23	24	25	26	27	28	29	30	31	32	33	34	35	36	37	38	39	40	41	42
Ground	A	H	A	H	A	H	A	H	A	H	A	H	A	H	A	H	A	H	A	A	H	H	A	H	A	H	A	H	A	H	A	H	A	H	A	H	A	H	A	H	H	A
Result	D	W	D	W	W	W	D	W	W	D	W	D	W	W	W	W	D	W	D	W	W	W	W	D	L	W	W	W	W	W	D	D	W	W	D	W	L	W	L	W	W	L
Position	12	6	7	5	3	1	3	2	2	2	2	2	2	1	1	1	1	1	1	1	1	1	1	1	1	1	1	1	1	1	1	1	1	1	1	1	1	1	1	1	1	1

Source: Competitive matches
A = Away; H = Home; W = Win; D = Draw; L = Loss; = Leader, 1997–98 UEFA Champions League group stage; = 1997–98 UEFA Champions League second qualifying round; = 1997–98 UEFA Cup first round

==== Matches ====
31 August 1996 1	Deportivo La Coruña	1–1	Real Madrid	A Coruña
	Martins 22'; Armando (yellow card) 74' (yellow-red card); Donato (yellow card) 89' (yellow-red card); Djukic (yellow card)	Report	Roberto Carlos 78'; Milla (yellow card) 52' (yellow-red card)	Stadium: Riazor; Referee: Dauden Ibañez

8 September 1996 2	Real Madrid	3–0	Hércules	Madrid
	Mijatović 16'; Raúl 28'; Raúl 71'; Seedorf (yellow card)	Report	Ferreras (yellow card); Palomino (yellow card)	Stadium: Santiago Bernabéu

16 September 1996 3	Real Betis	1–1	Real Madrid	Seville
	Alfonso 28'; Luis Fernandez (yellow card)	Report	Roberto Carlos 44'; Secretario (yellow card); Sanchís (yellow card); Hierro (yellow card); Šuker (yellow card)	Stadium: Benito Villamarín

22 September 1996 4	Real Madrid	1–0	Rayo Vallecano	Madrid
	Raúl 40'	Report		Stadium: Santiago Bernabéu; Referee: Puentes Leira

29 September 1996 5	Oviedo	2–3	Real Madrid	Oviedo
	Dubovsky 63' (pen.); Gamboa 84'; Onopko (red card) 40'	Report	Šuker 14'; Mijatović 15'; Víctor (yellow card) (goal) 43'; Secretario (yellow card) 63' (yellow-red card)	Stadium: Carlos Tartiere; Referee: Carmona Mendez

1 October 1996 6	Real Madrid	2–0	Espanyol	Madrid
	Raúl 6'; Šuker 26'; Sanchís (yellow card); Alkorta (yellow card); Roberto Carlos (yellow card)	Report	Pocchettino (yellow card); Arteaga (yellow card)	Stadium: Santiago Bernabéu; Referee: Iturralde Gonzalez

13 October 1996 7	Racing Santander	2–2	Real Madrid	Santander
	Beschastnykh 70'; Schürrer 80'	Report	Šuker 75' (pen.); Mijatović 83'	Stadium: El Sardinero; Referee: Hernanz Angulo

19 October 1996 8	Real Madrid	6–1	Real Sociedad	Madrid
	Mijatović 30'; Šuker 41' (pen.); Mild 63' (own goal); Šuker 68'; Mijatović 87'; Šuker 89'	Report	Kovacevic 10'; Pikabea (red card) 24'	Stadium: Santiago Bernabéu; Referee: Japon Sevilla

22 October 1996 9	Real Zaragoza	1–2	Real Madrid	Zaragoza
	Poyet 50'; Radimov (red card) 82'	Report	16' Šuker; 78' (pen.) Šuker	Stadium: La Romareda; Referee: Prados García

26 October 1996 10	Real Madrid	0–0	Tenerife	Madrid
		Report		Stadium: Santiago Bernabéu

3 November 1996 11	Compostela	1–2	Real Madrid	Compostela
	Luboslav Penev 68'	Report	22' Mijatovic; 78' Raúl	Stadium: San Lázaro

10 November 1996 12	Real Madrid	0–0	Logroñés	Madrid
		Report		Stadium: Santiago Bernabéu

17 November 1996 13	Sevilla	1–3	Real Madrid	Seville
	Salva 53'	Report	19' Mijatovic; 23' Suker; 60' Mijatovic	Stadium: Ramón Sánchez Pizjuán

24 November 1996 14	Real Madrid	4–2	Valencia	Madrid
	Suker 15'; Suker 21'; Suker 60'; Raúl 74'	Report	Karpin 9'	Stadium: Santiago Bernabéu

30 November 1996 15	Sporting Gijón	0–1	Real Madrid	Gijón
		Report	Hierro 19'	Stadium: El Molinón

7 December 1996 16	Real Madrid	2–0	Barcelona	Madrid
	Šuker 24', (yellow card); Mijatović 48'; Secretario (yellow card); Hierro (yellow card); Víctor (yellow card)	Report	Sergi (yellow card); Luis Enrique (yellow card)	Stadium: Santiago Bernabéu; Referee: Juan Manuel Brito Arcero

21 December 1996 17	Real Valladolid	1–1	Real Madrid	Valladolid
	Alkorta 58' (o.g.)	Report	15' Suker	Stadium: José Zorrilla

5 January 1997 18	Real Madrid	1–0	Athletic Bilbao	Madrid
	Raúl 59'	Report		Stadium: Santiago Bernabéu

11 January 1997 19	CF Extremadura	0–0	Real Madrid	Extremadura
		Report		Stadium: Francisco de la Hera; Referee: Celino Gracia Redondo

17 January 1997 20	Atlético de Madrid	1–4	Real Madrid	Madrid
	Kiko 32'; Prodan (yellow card); Pantic (yellow card); Esnaider (yellow card); Santi (yellow card)	Report	Raúl 46'; Raúl 82'; Seedorf 84'; Víctor 89'; Panucci (yellow card); Alkorta (yellow card); Amavisca (yellow card); Mijatović (red card)	Stadium: Vicente Calderón; Referee: Eduardo Garcia Iturralde

25 January 1997 21	Real Madrid	4–0	RC Celta	Madrid
	Roberto Carlos 20'; Redondo 54'; Raul 69'; Suker 74'	Report		Stadium: Santiago Bernabéu

1 February 1997 22	Real Madrid	3–2	Deportivo La Coruña	Madrid
	Panucci 19'; Hierro 52'; Suker 65'	Report	Flavio Conceicao 15'; Martins 50'	Stadium: Santiago Bernabéu

8 February 1997 23	Hércules	2–3	Real Madrid	Alicante
	Manuel Alfaro 5'; Nemanja Miljanovic 33'	Report	Mijatovic 11'; Seedorf 20'; Raúl 53'

14 February 1997 24	Real Madrid	2–2	Real Betis	Madrid
	Mijatovic 18'; Panucci (yellow card) , (goal) 52'; Hierro (yellow card); Suker (yellow card)	Report	Alfonso 6'; Finidi George 60'; Ríos (yellow card); Olías (yellow card); Alexis (yellow card); Jaime (yellow card)	Stadium: Santiago Bernabéu; Referee: Rodriguez Martel

18 February 1997 25	Rayo Vallecano	1–0	Real Madrid	Madrid
	Ezequiel Castillo 35'; José María (yellow card); Martín Gonzalez (yellow card); Barla (yellow card)	Report	Hierro (yellow card); Alkorta (yellow card); Mijatovic (yellow card)	Stadium: Vallecas; Attendance: 10,000; Referee: Carmona Mendez

22 February 1997 26	Real Madrid	6–1	Oviedo	Madrid
	Suker 3' (pen.); Mijatovic 56'; Suker 59'; Suker 61'; Raúl 66'; Víctor 89'	Report	Velamazan 87'	Stadium: Santiago Bernabéu

2 March 1997 27	Espanyol	0–2	Real Madrid	Barcelona
		Report	Raúl 68'; Raúl 89'

9 March 1997 28	Real Madrid	2–1	Racing Santander	Madrid
	Raúl 65'; Seedorf 68'	Report	Correa 44'	Stadium: Santiago Bernabéu

16 March 1997 29	Real Sociedad	1–2	Real Madrid	San Sebastián
	Adepoju 71'	Report	Raúl 40'; Roberto Carlos 47'

22 March 1997 30	Real Madrid	2–0	Real Zaragoza	Madrid
	Hierro 35'; Hierro 43'	Report		Stadium: Santiago Bernabéu

29 March 1997 31	Tenerife	1–1	Real Madrid	Tenerife
	Neuville 66'	Report	Víctor 58'

6 April 1997 32	Real Madrid	0–0	Compostela	Madrid
		Report		Stadium: Santiago Bernabéu

12 April 1997 33	Logroñés	0–2	Real Madrid	Logroñés
		Report	Víctor 34'; Raúl 67'

15 April 1997 34	Real Madrid	4–2	Sevilla	Madrid
	Seedorf 44'; Raúl 59'; Hierro 83'; Mijatovic 89'	Report	José Mari 1'; Tarik Oulida 20'	Stadium: Santiago Bernabéu

20 April 1997 35	Valencia	1–1	Real Madrid	Valencia
	Ortega 88' (pen.)	Report	Raúl 64'	Stadium: Mestalla

3 May 1997 36	Real Madrid	3–1	Sporting Gijón	Madrid
	Suker 38'; Roberto Carlos 62'; Suker 71'	Report	Cheryshev 9'	Stadium: Santiago Bernabéu

10 May 1997 37	Barcelona	1–0	Real Madrid	Barcelona
	Ronaldo (yellow card) , (goal) 44'; Ferrer (yellow card); Figo (yellow card)	Report	Roberto Carlos (yellow card); Alkorta (yellow card); Suker (yellow card)	Stadium: Camp Nou; Referee: Rodriguez Martel

17 May 1997 38	Real Madrid	1–0	Real Valladolid	Madrid
	Suker 57' (pen.)	Report		Stadium: Santiago Bernabéu

24 May 1997 39	Athletic Bilbao	1–0	Real Madrid	Bilbao
	Carlos García 56'	Report		Stadium: San Mames

31 May 1997 40	Real Madrid	5–0	CF Extremadura	Madrid
	Raúl 9'; Seedorf 46'; Seedorf 59'; Suker 67' (pen.); Suker 89'	Report		Stadium: Santiago Bernabéu

13 June 1997 41	Real Madrid	3–1	Atlético de Madrid	Madrid
	Raúl 36'; Hierro 43'; Mijatovic 56'	Report	Esnáider 64'	Stadium: Santiago Bernabéu; Referee: Berrenchea Montero

21 June 1997 42	Celta	4–0	Real Madrid	Vigo
	Gudelj 8'; Gudelj 10'; Juan Sanchez 48'; Gudelj 89'	Report		Stadium: Balaidos

=== Copa del Rey ===
==== Second round ====
6 November 1996	UD Salamanca	0–2	Real Madrid	Salamanca
		Report

27 November 1996	Real Madrid	2–0	UD Salamanca	Madrid
		Report		Stadium: Santiago Bernabéu

==== Third round ====
9 January 1997	Real Madrid	2–1	Real Valladolid	Madrid
		Report		Stadium: Santiago Bernabéu

15 January 1997	Real Valladolid	0–2	Real Madrid	Valladolid
		Report		Stadium: José Zorrilla

==== Round of 16 ====
30 January 1997	FC Barcelona	3–2	Real Madrid	Barcelona
	Ronaldo 13' Nadal 70' Giovanni 78'	Report	Suker 16' Hierro 67'	Stadium: Camp Nou; Attendance: 97,000; Referee: Lopez Nieto

6 February 1997	Real Madrid	1–1	FC Barcelona	Madrid
	Suker 79'pen	Report	Roberto Carlos 69'(o.g)	Stadium: Santiago Bernabéu; Attendance: 110,000; Referee: Diaz Vega

== Statistics ==
=== Player statistics ===
No.	Pos	Nat	Player	Total		La Liga		Copa del Rey	
No.	Pos	Nat	Player	Apps	Goals	Apps	Goals	Apps	Goals
25	GK	(Germany) GER	Illgner	46	-36	40	-31	6	-5
17	DF	(Italy) ITA	Panucci	21	2	19	2	2	0
18	DF	(Spain) ESP	Alkorta	45	1	40	0	5	1
4	DF	(Spain) ESP	Hierro	45	8	39	6	6	2
3	DF	(Brazil) BRA	Roberto Carlos	42	5	37	5	5	0
26	MF	(Spain) ESP	Víctor	41	6	25+11	5	3+2	1
6	MF	(Argentina) ARG	Redondo	39	1	31+2	1	6	0
10	MF	(Netherlands) NED	Seedorf	42	6	37+1	6	3+1	0
7	MF	(Spain) ESP	Raúl	47	22	41+1	21	4+1	1
8	FW	(Federal Republic of Yugoslavia) YUG	Mijatović	43	15	38	14	4+1	1
9	FW	(Croatia) CRO	Šuker	43	29	38	24	5	5
13	GK	(Spain) ESP	Cañizares	2	-5	2	-5	0	0
11	MF	(Spain) ESP	Amavisca	31	0	14+12	0	5	0
2	DF	(Spain) ESP	Chendo	18	0	14+2	0	0+2	0
12	DF	(Portugal) POR	Secretário	17	0	13	0	3+1	0
5	DF	(Spain) ESP	Sanchis	22	0	13+9	0	0	0
14	MF	(Spain) ESP	Milla	23	0	6+13	0	3+1	0
24	FW	(Spain) ESP	Alvaro	7	0	5+2	0	0	0
21	DF	(Spain) ESP	García Calvo	7	0	4+2	0	0+1	0
21	MF	(Brazil) BRA	Zé Roberto	9	0	2+7	0	0	0
15	DF	(Spain) ESP	Sanz	9	0	2+4	0	2+1	0
19	DF	(Spain) ESP	Lasa	15	0	2+11	0	2	0
23	MF	(Spain) ESP	Guti	17	0	0+14	0	2+1	0
20	FW	(Federal Republic of Yugoslavia) YUG	Petković	3	0	0+2	0	0+1	0
27	FW	(Spain) ESP	Irurzun	1	0	0	0	0+1	0
1	GK	(Spain) ESP	Buyo	0	0	0	0	0	0

- Source: https://www.bdfutbol.com/en/t/t1996-972.html
