= Dejan Petković =

Serbian footballer and football pundit

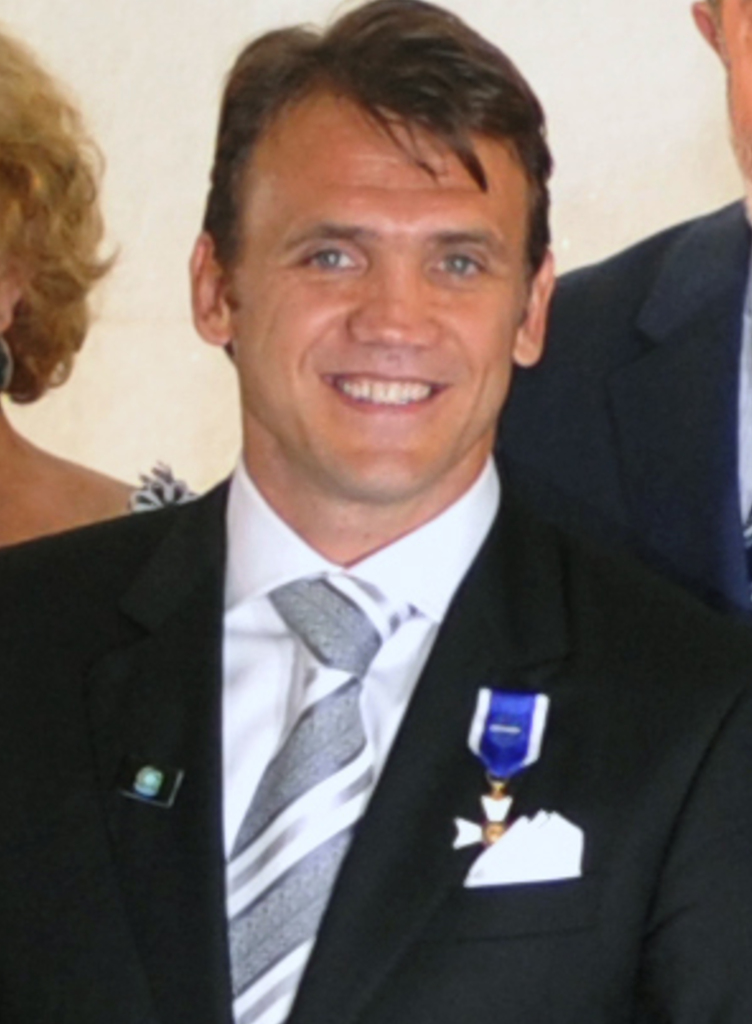
- Petković in 2010

Personal information
- Date of birth: 10 September 1972 (age 54)
- Place of birth: Majdanpek, SR Serbia, SFR Yugoslavia
- Height: 1.72 m (5 ft 8 in)
- Position: Attacking midfielder

Youth career
- Majdanpek
- 1987–1988: Radnički Niš

Senior career*
Years	Team	Apps	(Gls)
1988–1992	Radnički Niš	70	(10)
1992–1995	Red Star Belgrade	109	(28)
1995–1997	Real Madrid	5	(0)
1996	→ Sevilla (loan)	8	(1)
1997	→ Racing Santander (loan)	9	(0)
1997–1999	Vitória	29	(16)
1999	Venezia	13	(1)
2000–2002	Flamengo	44	(18)
2002–2003	Vasco da Gama	19	(2)
2003–2004	Shanghai Shenhua	22	(7)
2004	Vasco da Gama	36	(18)
2005	Al-Ittihad	5	(2)
2005–2006	Fluminense	39	(11)
2007	Goiás	2	(0)
2007	Santos	21	(1)
2008	Atlético Mineiro	27	(4)
2009–2011	Flamengo	54	(13)
Total		512	(132)

International career
1995–1998	FR Yugoslavia	6	(1)

Managerial career
- 2014: Atlético Paranaense U23
- 2015: Criciúma
- 2016: Sampaio Corrêa
- 2017: Vitória
- * Club domestic league appearances and goals

Dejan Petković (Serbian Cyrillic: Дејан Петковић, pronounced [dějan pětkoʋitɕ]; born 10 September 1972) is a Serbian football pundit and former professional footballer who played as an attacking midfielder. He was a technically gifted playmaker, renowned for his dribbling skills, passing, and goalscoring ability. A dead-ball specialist, Petković was also known for his bending free kicks and his ability to score directly from corner kicks.

Widely known by the nickname Rambo in his native country, Petković is known simply as Pet in Brazil, where he spent most of his 23-year playing career. He played for a total of 15 clubs, most notably Flamengo in two spells, and was part of the Mengão squads that won several titles, including the 2009 Brasileirão. He also spent two years with Real Madrid in Spain, but was mostly sent on loan to two other La Liga teams. At international level, Petković represented FR Yugoslavia during the 1990s, earning six caps and scoring one goal.

In May 2026, Petković became the Global Brand Ambassador of Meridian Holdings.

== Early life ==
Born to father Dobrivoje (traffic technician from Niš) and mother Milena (construction technician from Petrovac na Mlavi) who met in the small mining town of Majdanpek where they both arrived in search of work, young Dejan immediately took to football.

== Club career ==
=== Radnički Niš ===
Petković's playing career started in 1988 at Radnički Niš. He became the youngest player ever to play an official match in the history of old Yugoslav First League, debuting on 25 September 1988 when he was 16 years and 15 days old, against Željezničar Sarajevo thus beating Mitar Mrkela's record by one day. Radnički ended up winning 4–0 in that match. Petković's age record has since been broken by Slavko Perović and Danijel Aleksić. Petković still helps his first club, which has since then declined.

=== Red Star Belgrade ===
In July 1992, Petković was bought by Red Star Belgrade. Though not even 20 years of age, he arrived with a reputation as a skilled technical playmaker. As established Yugoslav internationals such as Dejan Savićević, Darko Pančev, Vladimir Jugović, and Siniša Mihajlović left the club during the same summer, Petković was given a first-team run straight away by new head coach Milan Živadinović, appearing in 30 league matches and scoring 5 goals in his first season in Belgrade.

He ended up staying with Red Star until December 1995 (three and a half seasons), winning one First League of FR Yugoslavia title and two FR Yugoslavia Cups. His transfer to Real Madrid was principally agreed during summer 1995, but Red Star decided to hang on to him for the 1995–96 UEFA Cup where the club expected to do well after finally being allowed back on the European scene following years of sporting sanctions due to regional conflicts. However, Red Star was eliminated by Swiss club Neuchâtel Xamax in the preliminary round.

=== Real Madrid ===
In December 1995, 23-year-old Petković joined the Spanish giants Real Madrid. At the time of his arrival, the club was not where it wanted to be in the league, hovering just outside the European spots in 6th and 7th place.

Playing under head coach Jorge Valdano, Rambo made his league debut on 17 December versus Celta de Vigo as a 65th-minute sub for the legendary club veteran Míchel as Madrid won 1–0 at home. Petković would see action again on 3 January at home versus Real Valladolid — Madrid was comfortably 4–1 ahead when Valdano threw Petković on for Iván Zamorano in the 61st minute. What would turn out to be Petković's last appearance of the season for the club came the following week away at lowly CP Mérida — Real let the 0–2 lead slip by conceding two goals and in the 81st minute Valdano sent Petković in for Freddy Rincón in search of a goal, but the score stayed 2–2.

Within a fortnight Petković was loaned out to Sevilla without getting a chance to have a starting eleven appearance during his one month at the Bernabeu.

==== Loan to Sevilla ====
Arriving to Estadio Sánchez Pizjuán in mid-January 1996, Petković was once again parachuted into a club battling turmoil. Sevilla was barely above the relegation zone with head coach Juan Carlos Álvarez (already their second head coach of the season) on thin ice.

Juan Carlos gave his new Serbian acquisition his debut at home on 24 January vs Albacete as a starter. Playing upfront with Davor Šuker as strike partner, Petković had an average outing as Sevilla drew 1–1 with Castilian visitors, which cost head coach Juan Carlos his job. Four days later away at Real Sociedad, new head coach Víctor Espárrago gave Petković the starting assignment again alongside Šuker, but subbed him off for Monchu early into the second half in the 53rd minute. The next week versus Racing de Santander, Petković was moved back into attacking midfielder role just behind Šuker and Monchu, however Sevilla again lost 0–1 while Petković got subbed off in the 59th minute. The following week Petković got relegated to the bench, only getting a bit part as an 89th-minute sub as Sevilla improbably triumphed away at league-leaders Atletico Madrid, however, the week after that he was back in the starting assignment.

Petković finished out the 1995–96 La Liga season in Sevilla, appearing in 8 league matches (7 as a starter) and scoring 1 goal.

==== Return to Madrid ====
During summer 1996, Petković returned from the loan spell in Sevilla. The Real squad that he returned to was radically different from the one he had left six months earlier: from the new head coach Fabio Capello over to attack-minded left back Roberto Carlos from Inter Milan, right back Christian Panucci from AC Milan, attacking midfielder Clarence Seedorf from Sampdoria right down to the all new forward line with Petković's former Sevilla teammate Šuker, and fellow Yugoslav Predrag Mijatović from Valencia.

The competition for spots up front thus got even tougher. Despite having a reputation for cautious and defensive football, Capello played a three-man attack of Raúl, Mijatović, and Šuker, with Seedorf just behind them. It became clear that Capello was not counting on Petković, as he did not play a match until coming on as late substitute in the fourth match of the season. A week later Petković came on as a late substitute at Real Oviedo for his last Madrid appearance.

==== Loan to Santander ====
Petković got loaned out to Racing de Santander in January 1997. He then briefly returned to Real before being discovered by Vitória in a friendly tournament in which both clubs were involved. along with Real Mallorca and Flamengo.

=== Vitória ===
In October 1997, Petković joined Vitória; the transfer was paid by the club's sponsor, Banco Excel. In the rubro-negro baiano he started his successful Brazilian career, winning one Bahia State Championships and a Copa do Nordeste. He stayed until 1999 at Vitória, when he joined Venezia of Italy, after an 8 billion lire transfer.

=== Flamengo ===
Petković did not succeed at Venezia, and quickly returned to Brazil, where he joined Flamengo of Rio de Janeiro. In Flamengo his skills were fundamental in helping the team win the last two titles of the historic three in a row series against arch-rivals Vasco, from 1999 to 2001.

One month later, another free kick goal by Petković, against São Paulo, allowed Flamengo to win the Copa dos Campeões and return to Copa Libertadores next year. Hugely popular at the time, he was known as "Pet" by the supporters.

However, at 2001 Campeonato Brasileiro, Flamengo finished only one position above the relegated teams. The club also lost, in January 2002, the Copa Mercosul final against the Argentine side San Lorenzo, in a match in which Petković was sent off.

=== Vasco da Gama ===
In 2002, he moved to Vasco da Gama, where he stayed until 2004. He played for a short time at the Chinese club Shanghai Shenhua during this period where they won the 2003 league title. Unfortunately, in 2013 the Chinese Football Association would revoke the league title after it was discovered the Shenhua General manager Lou Shifang had bribed officials to be biased to Shenhua in games that season. During his second spell at Vasco he helped his team avoid relegation at Campeonato Brasileiro, being the club's top scorer and top assistant. Vasco failed to record a win the 10 matches without Petković, acquiring only 10% of available points; with him the cruzmaltinos obtained 45.7% of these points. After helping them stay up, Petković was awarded Bola de Prata from the Placar magazine as one of the two best midfielders in the league.

During that year he often played with an ex-teammate from Radnički, Montenegrin goalkeeper Željko Tadić, who was scouted by him.

=== Fourth team in Brazil: Fluminense ===
After a half-year in Saudi Arabia, where he played for Al-Ittihad, he returned to Rio de Janeiro in August 2005, now to play for Fluminense. Already 33 years old, Petković had to face a certain mistrust from the club's fans due to his association with Flamengo. However, his amazing performance in his third match against Cruzeiro, put an end to fan's misgivings, as he scored twice in a 6–2 away win. His first was the 1000th goal score by the Fluminense in the Brazilian Championship, earning Petković a commemorative plate in his honour at the club's headquarters. In this goal, Petković passed through three opponents in a short space, shooting just in time to avoid the oncoming goalkeeper. In the second one, he placed a powerful left-foot shot from outside the penalty box.

After other great exhibitions, he received his second consecutive Silver Ball in the Brazilian federation annual award ceremony. After a bad season in 2006, when Fluminense had to fight relegation, he left the club.

=== Other clubs ===
In 2007, he played at Santos after signing a short-term deal from Goiás until the end of the 2007 season. In 2008, Petković played for Atlético Mineiro, signed in late March 2008 as the great star of the club's centennial celebrations. Nevertheless, his contract was not renewed at the end of the season on orders from the newly arrived coach, Emerson Leão who previously also released Petković from Santos when he arrived there in December 2007.

=== Return to Flamengo ===
On 20 May 2009 Flamengo announced the free transfer signing of Petković, despite previously having taken the club to court over unpaid wages in the amount of US$9 million. Though the two parties managed to settle the outstanding financial issues out of court prior to his signing, Petković's return was still met with a lot of scepticism, even outright opposition, from many people within the club as well as outside observers all of whom had doubts about his ability to perform at such an age. Some also expressed concern over the fact that he missed the Rio de Janeiro state championship part of the season, meaning that he hadn't played any competitive football in the 6 months since his dismissal from Atlético Mineiro.

However, much to the surprise of many people, 37-year-old Petković played a pivotal role for Flamengo, scoring 8 goals (including 2 direct from corners) and leading the club's challenge to eventually win its sixth Brazilian Championship title, the first of his career. He overcame being left out of the team by manager Cuca when his replacement in July, Andrade, included him in the team and allowed him to help the club rise from 14th place. Petković was praised by the Brazilian press for a number of outstanding performances, including a brace he scored in round 30 for a 2–0 win away at league leaders Palmeiras on 18 October 2009, as well as his round 34 contribution on 8 November away at Atlético Mineiro where the team recorded important 1–3 win.

On 20 November 2009 he was inducted into the Brazilian Hall of Fame in the Maracana, thus becoming only the fifth non-Brazilian and third European to receive such an honour in Brazil. Then on 7 December, as the season finished and Flamengo celebrated their title, Petković won the traditional Bola de Prata (Silver Ball) organized by the sports magazine Placar and ESPN Brasil for best midfielder of the 2009 Brazilian Championship. It was the third time that he was awarded the prize.

Starting the new season from the very beginning, Petković entered his first match of the 2010 Rio state championship as a late substitute and scored a goal on what was virtually his first touch of the contest at Volta Redonda on 20 January 2010.

On 5 June 2011, Petković retired as a professional player after playing the first half of the league match against Corinthians. To commemorate his retirement, all Flamengo players had Petković's name on the back of their jerseys in the match.

== International career ==
Petković started playing by SFR Yugoslavia youth teams when he was 15 years old. In that age, he even scored one of the fastest goals in football, after just three seconds in a match against Cyprus. He was later called to 1992 Toulon Tournament, alongside players like Savo Milošević, Zoran Mirković, Željko Cicović, Elvir Bolić, Spira Grujić, Mitko Stojkovski, Srđan Bajčetić, Miladin Bečanović, Igor Taševski, Sretko Vuksanović and Željko Tadić. His team made a runner-up campaign, in which Petković scored two goals in a 3–0 triumph over the United States (against players such as Brad Friedel, Claudio Reyna, Alexi Lalas and Cobi Jones).

While still playing in that youth tournament, he received his first call up to the senior national team, being included for the UEFA Euro 1992 squad. Yugoslav coaches had already called eighteen from the twenty allowed players, without Croats, keeping some Macedonians, two Slovenes and just one Bosniak alongside the Serbs and Montenegrins. It was expected that the later two players would be Miroslav Đukić and Dragiša Binić, but Petković and Slobodan Krčmarević were included instead. Just one day after that 3–0 winning game against USA at the Toulon Tournament, played on May 27, Petković made his first appearance for the main Yugoslav team, an unofficial friendly against AC Fiorentina on May 28. He was even a starting player in the match - Omerović (Leković), Radinović (Novak), Petrić (Milanič), Dubajić; Mihajlović, Jugović, Brnović, Jokanović; Mijatović, Stojković and him (replaced by Jakovljević). Jokanović scored first in Stadio Artemio Franchi, but the Italian club did won by 2–1. It would be the last match of the old Yugoslavia national team before its name being reduced to the Serbia and Montenegro federation.

The Yugoslavia team, already settled in Sweden for the tournament, would be suspended at 31 May due to its civil wars, just ten days before the opening match. After that, Petković was called to FR Yugoslavia first matches after its banning, in December 1994, although staying in the bench – curiously, the first match of Yugoslav return was against Brazil. In a South American tour, the second match would be against Argentina. In that day, Petković started disagreements with the then coach Slobodan Santrač. The player was praised in the training sessions and, under Santrač's orders, warmed up from the 30th minute to the 80th one and then decided to seat, as thinking he would not play anymore. Santrač was disgusted and called another reserve to enter; it was Darko Kovačević, who made his senior debut as replacing Predrag Mijatović. After two another matches without being used, Petković then earned his first cap on 31 March 1995, against Uruguay, in Belgrade. He was included in the starting players as of the next Yugoslav match, against Russia. In his second cap, he scored a goal just one minute after a Valery Karpin one, but Yugoslavia still lost by 2–1. Petković also played the three later matches of Yugoslavia in 1995. All of them were winnings in away fields. In the last 1995 match, however, he again had disagreements with Santrač, even after giving three assists and scoring an incorrectly invalid goal. After such a performance, the player did not like criticism from the coach, who appointed two wrong passes of Petković, who did objections to Santrač qualities. Petković still received a Santrač call up for a match against Romania in March 1996, after some good initial performances for Real Madrid and Sevilla. It was the first 1996 game of Yugoslav team. However, two weeks before it, in a Sevilla training, Petković suffered a serious injury which would withdraw him for the rest of the season. Santrač would not call him anymore and the player did not take part in the 1998 FIFA World Cup.

It was only after Milan Živadinović took the helm of the Yugoslavia national team that Petković earned another chance with his national side – curiously, in another friendly against Brazil, in September 1998. Playing for Vitória at the time, Petković traveled to São Luís in the same flight as the Brazilian team. He was even a starting player in a 1–1 draw, being later replaced by Saša Ćurčić. It would be his last official match for the national team. Because of that, Petković later expressed his belief in being called up for that game just because he would be a good Portuguese language translator to Yugoslav crew.

He still later played another two unofficial matches for Yugoslavia, in December 1999, under Vujadin Boškov rule. Petković was a starting player and even captain against the Canary Islands (scoring a goal in a 2–2 draw against Luis Molowny coached players) and Catalonia (a 1–0 defeat). He was meanwhile a Venezia player, but some days later he left Italy to play again in Brazil, for Flamengo. Some also blame Petković's few and far in between call-ups on the fact he played for Brazilian sides most of his career, and thus was not always readily available for Yugoslavian coaches to watch him perform, evidenced by the fact he was omitted by Boškov from the Euro 2000 roster after coming to Flamengo. Furthermore, Petković declared in an interview to Placar magazine that he was more likely to get a call-up had he stayed at Venezia, a club he regarded as "ten times weaker club than Flamengo". Petković was also rumoured to not have very favorable relationships with the Football Association of Yugoslavia, yet another speculation for his few caps. According to him and his family, another reason was his denial in accept bribes charged by high ranked Federation officials.

In 2004, some have even felt Petković would have made the Seleção if he were Brazilian. To that end, after the changing of the former FR Yugoslavia into Serbia and Montenegro the previous year, he publicized his dream in being picked by the Brazil national side, but he did not have Brazilian citizenship. In 2006, a campaign in his native country urged the Serbian FA to select Petković for Serbia and Montenegro's final roster for the World Cup in Germany. Striker Savo Milošević even went as far as saying Petković would be a welcome addition. In January 2006, it was announced that Petković would be called up for friendly matches in February, but nothing ever came of it. The then Serbia and Montenegro coach Ilija Petković, who is not a relative of him, thought Dejan Petković would disrupt the team's harmony, as he had a reputation for having a very loud personality. However, even before the nation upcoming final breakup, the harmony was disrupted by the coach himself, after Ilija called his son Dušan Petković, a defender who played just a few matches until 2004 for the team, to replace the injured forward Mirko Vučinić. Embarrassed after huge criticism, Dušan asked to not take part of the squad.

In a first moment, it was believed that the replacement player would be Dejan Petković, as he told in 2018 to El País journal: "I came from a fantastic 2005 Campeonato Brasileiro for Fluminense. My matches in Brazil were broadcast in Serbia. The whole country asked for me to be called up. They always came up with an excuse not to. When the World Cup squad list was launched, people asked themselves why I was not selected. In those days, Zico said that Serbia would win the World Cup: 'they have 23 players better than Pet'. So, Vučinić injured himself. And then they announced the substitute: 'D. Petković'. People started calling to congratulate me, but actually the chosen one was Dušan Petković, the coach's son. He exchanged a forward for a defender. Reactions were so negative, to the point that, in the preparation for the World Cup, the boy could not stand the pressure and left, embarrassed of being there. So we played the World Cup with one player less. They never gave me an official statement. Off the record it's been said that, if they called me up, I would've played. Unfortunately, I lost two World Cups. I joined the select group of good players who never played a World Cup. I have no frustrations for not playing in the World Cup, because it was no failure of mine. In football, a few people have the power to ruin many things. The people who managed my national team did bad things to me, not the association itself. I hold no grudges".

Petković retired from professional football without ever playing for the White Eagles. In 2009, Serbia coach Radomir Antić praised Petković's success as an incoming 2009 Brazilian champion for Flamengo, but confirmed the player's unlikely chances of inclusion for the 2010 FIFA World Cup. Petković no longer had such expectations, feeling himself too old at the age of 37: "I wish I was at least ten years younger to go to a World Cup", he said while celebrating his country's qualification for South Africa. He only held some desire in playing one last friendly match for his national team.

== Playing style ==
He is considered one of the best foreign players to have played in Brazil, a great free and corner kicker and passer. In 2006 while playing for Fluminense, he scored a goal directly from a corner against Grêmio. In the next game, he scored another, but the ball hit the hand of a player from Fluminense and entered the goal; nonetheless, the officials counted it as one. Overall, he scored eight goals from corner kicks in his career, the last one on 8 November 2009 for Flamengo against Atlético Mineiro in the Brazilian Série A. He is currently the record holder for most goals from corners scored in football history.

== Legacy ==
- His form in the first half of 2001 preceded the arrival of five more Serbs to Brazilian football. Željko Tadić (who would play later with Petković at Vasco), Miodrag Anđelković, Nikola Damjanac, Vladimir Đorđević, Dejan Osmanović, and Vladimir Petković (unrelated to Dejan Petković).
- In November 2009, following Petković's pinnacle season at Flamengo, Serbian film director Darko Bajić started shooting a documentary on Petković's life and career path. Initially with the working title of Rambo Petković – 90 minuta sa produžecima, životni meč and later O Gringo, the film is meant to be shown before the 2010 World Cup. Apparently, the director wanted to make the film ever since Petković's initial successes with Flamengo in 2001, but the player wasn't thrilled with the idea. Petković eventually agreed during his second stint with Flamengo. The yet unfinished movie was promoted in Belgrade on 29 December 2009.
- His pivotal role in Flamengo's road to its sixth league title motivated a pop song, "É o Pet".
- Although his return home to possibly finish out his career with Red Star and/or perhaps take an administrative role in the club once his playing career is over was occasionally mentioned in Serbian media, Petković said in early 2010 that he'll continue living in Brazil even after stopping playing. Though not mentioning anything specific, he said that he wants to take advantage of the opportunities 2014 World Cup and 2016 Rio Olympics will provide for those who want to be involved with sports.
- Petković was a color commentator for Brazilian sports cable franchise SporTV during the 2018 World Cup. He also acted as an analyst alongside Clarence Seedorf in a nightly show hosted by sports journalists André Rizek and Marcelo Barreto.

== Career statistics ==
=== Club ===
Appearances and goals by club, season and competition
Club	Season	League			State league (Note: Includes Campeonato Baiano, Campeonato Carioca)		National cup (Note: Includes FR Yugoslavia Cup, Copa del Rey, Copa do Brasil, Coppa Italia)		Continental		Other		Total	
Club	Season	Division	Apps	Goals	Apps	Goals	Apps	Goals	Apps	Goals	Apps	Goals	Apps	Goals
Radnički Niš	1988–89	Yugoslav First League	2	0	—				—		—		2	0
Radnički Niš	1989–90	Yugoslav First League	21	2	—				—		—		21	2
Radnički Niš	1990–91	Yugoslav First League	17	0	—				—		—		17	0
Radnički Niš	1991–92	Yugoslav First League	30	8	—				—		—		30	8
Radnički Niš	Total		70	10	—				—		—		70	10
Red Star Belgrade	1992–93	First League of FR Yugoslavia	30	5	—		7	3	—		—		37	8
Red Star Belgrade	1993–94	First League of FR Yugoslavia	29	10	—		7	3	—		—		36	13
Red Star Belgrade	1994–95	First League of FR Yugoslavia	36	8	—		8	2	—		—		44	10
Red Star Belgrade	1995–96	First League of FR Yugoslavia	14	5	—		4	3	2 (Note: Appearances in UEFA Cup)	0	—		20	8
Red Star Belgrade	Total		109	28	—		26	11	2	0	—		137	39
Real Madrid	1995–96	La Liga	3	0	—		0	0	0	0	0	0	3	0
Real Madrid	1996–97	La Liga	2	0	—		1	0	—		—		3	0
Real Madrid	Total		5	0	—		1	0	0	0	0	0	6	0
Sevilla (loan)	1995–96	La Liga	8	1	—		2	0	—		—		10	1
Racing Santander (loan)	1996–97	La Liga	9	0	—		4	0	—		—		13	0
Vitória	1997	Série A	8	2	0	0	0	0	—				8	2
Vitória	1998	Série A	21	14			4	1	—				25	15
Vitória	1999	Série A	0	0	16	18	5	7	—				21	25
Vitória	Total		29	16	16	18	9	8	—				54	42
Venezia	1999–2000	Serie A	13	1	—		4	1	—		—		17	2
Flamengo	2000	Série A	23	14	14	4	6	2	8 (Note: Appearances in Copa Mercosur)	5	5 (Note: Four appearances and one goal in Copa dos Campeões, one appearance and one goal in Torneio Rio–São Paulo)	2	56	27
Flamengo	2001	Série A	21	4	11	4	5	1	10	1	6 (Note: Appearances in Copa dos Campeões)	2	53	12
Flamengo	2002	Série A	0	0	0	0	0	0	3 (Note: Appearances in Copa Libertadores)	0	5 (Note: Appearances in Torneio Rio–São Paulo)	2	8	2
Flamengo	Total		44	18	25	8	11	3	21	6	16	6	117	41
Vasco da Gama	2002	Série A	19	2	0	0	0	0	—		—		19	2
Vasco da Gama	2003	Série A	0	0	11	8	1	0	—		—		12	8
Vasco da Gama	Total		19	2	11	8	1	0	—		—		31	10
Shanghai Shenhua	2003	Chinese Jia-A League	22	7	—				—		1 (Note: Appearances in Chinese FA Super Cup)	0	23	7
Vasco da Gama	2004	Série A	36	18	0	0	0	0	—		—		36	18
Al-Ittihad	2004–05	Saudi Premier League	5	2	—				0	0			5	2
Fluminense	2005	Série A	20	6	0	0	0	0	4 (Note: Appearances in Copa Sudamericana)	1	—		24	7
Fluminense	2006	Série A	19	5	8	3	7	3	2	0	—		36	11
Fluminense	Total		39	11	8	3	7	3	6	1	—		60	18
Goiás	2007	Série A	2	0			2	0	—				4	0
Santos	2007	Série A	21	1	0	0	0	0	0	0	—		21	1
Atlético Mineiro	2008	Série A	27	4	0	0	4	1	1	0	—		32	5
Flamengo	2009	Série A	23	8	0	0	0	0	2	0	—		25	8
Flamengo	2010	Série A	30	5	13	1	0	0	8	0	—		51	6
Flamengo	2011	Série A	1	0	0	0	0	0	0	0	—		1	0
Flamengo	Total		54	13	13	1	0	0	10	0	—		77	14
Career total			512	132	73	38	71	27	40	7	17	6	713	210

== Honours ==
Red Star Belgrade

- First League of FR Yugoslavia: 1994–95
- FR Yugoslavia Cup: 1992–93, 1994–95

Real Madrid

- La Liga: 1996–97
- Supercopa de España: 1997

Vitória

- Campeonato Baiano: 1999
- Copa do Nordeste: 1999

Flamengo

- Campeonato Brasileiro Série A: 2009
- Campeonato Carioca: 2000, 2001
- Copa dos Campeões: 2001

Shanghai Shenhua

- Chinese Jia-A League: 2003 (revoked due to match-fixing scandal)

Vasco da Gama

- Campeonato Carioca: 2003

Al-Ittihad

- Arab Champions League: 2005

Individual

- Copa do Brasil top scorer: 1999
- Campeonato Baiano top scorer: 1999
- Campeonato Brasileiro Série A Team of the Year: 2005, 2009
- Bola de Prata: 2004, 2005, 2009
- Troféu Mesa Redonda Best Player: 2009
- Niš Sportsperson of the Year: 2009

Orders and special awards

- EC Vitória's Player of the Twentieth Century (by popular vote)
- Scored the thousandth goal of Fluminense FC in the Campeonato Brasileiro (v. Cruzeiro, on 7 September 2005)
- Scored the most Olympic goals ever by a professional footballer: 8
- Nominated to the Maracanã Walk of Fame
- Named Honorary Citizen of Rio de Janeiro by the State Legislative Assembly

== Diplomatic career ==
On 20 June 2010, Serbian Minister of Foreign Affairs, Vuk Jeremić, announced the appointment of Dejan Petković to Honorary Consul of Serbia in Brazil.
