= Mijat =

Mijat (Cyrillic script: Мијат) is a masculine given name. It may refer to:

- Mijat Gaćinović (born 1995), footballer
- Mijat Marić (born 1984), footballer
- Mijat Stojanović (1818–1881), ethnographer
- Mijat Tomić (died 1656), hajduk

== See also ==
- Mijatović
- Mijatovac
