= Edgar Sá =

Portuguese footballer

Personal information
- Full name: Edgar Francisco Reis Sá
- Date of birth: 10 April 1979 (age 47)
- Place of birth: Esmoriz, Portugal
- Height: 1.81 m (5 ft 11 in)
- Position: Centre-back

Youth career
- 1989–1996: Espinho
- 1996–1998: Porto

Senior career*
Years	Team	Apps	(Gls)
1998–1999	Trofense	12	(0)
1999–2002	Lourosa	57	(4)
2002–2003	Covilhã	34	(6)
2003–2005	Marco	47	(4)
2005–2006	Ovarense	32	(2)
2006–2007	Espinho	23	(0)
2007–2010	Covilhã	96	(14)
2010–2012	Santa Clara	34	(1)
2012–2016	Covilhã	143	(7)
2016–2017	Benfica Castelo Branco	28	(0)
2017–2018	AD Oliveirense	25	(4)
2018–2019	Salgueiros	24	(1)
Total		510	(38)
- * Club domestic league appearances and goals

Edgar Francisco Reis Sá (born 10 April 1979) is a Portuguese football coach and former player, who is the first-team coach of EFL Championship club Wolverhampton Wanderers.

== Career ==
Born in Esmoriz, Aveiro District, Sá spent most of his career with S.C. Covilhã, for whom he played 273 games between the Segunda Liga and the third division, scoring 27 goals in his three spells. He was awarded the club's medal of honour when he left in June 2016 at the age of 37, having already majored in sports science.

At the professional level, Sá also represented F.C. Marco, A.D. Ovarense and C.D. Santa Clara, going on to total 349 appearances.
