= Babina Greda =

- Municipality
- Municipality of Babina Greda; Općina Babina Greda
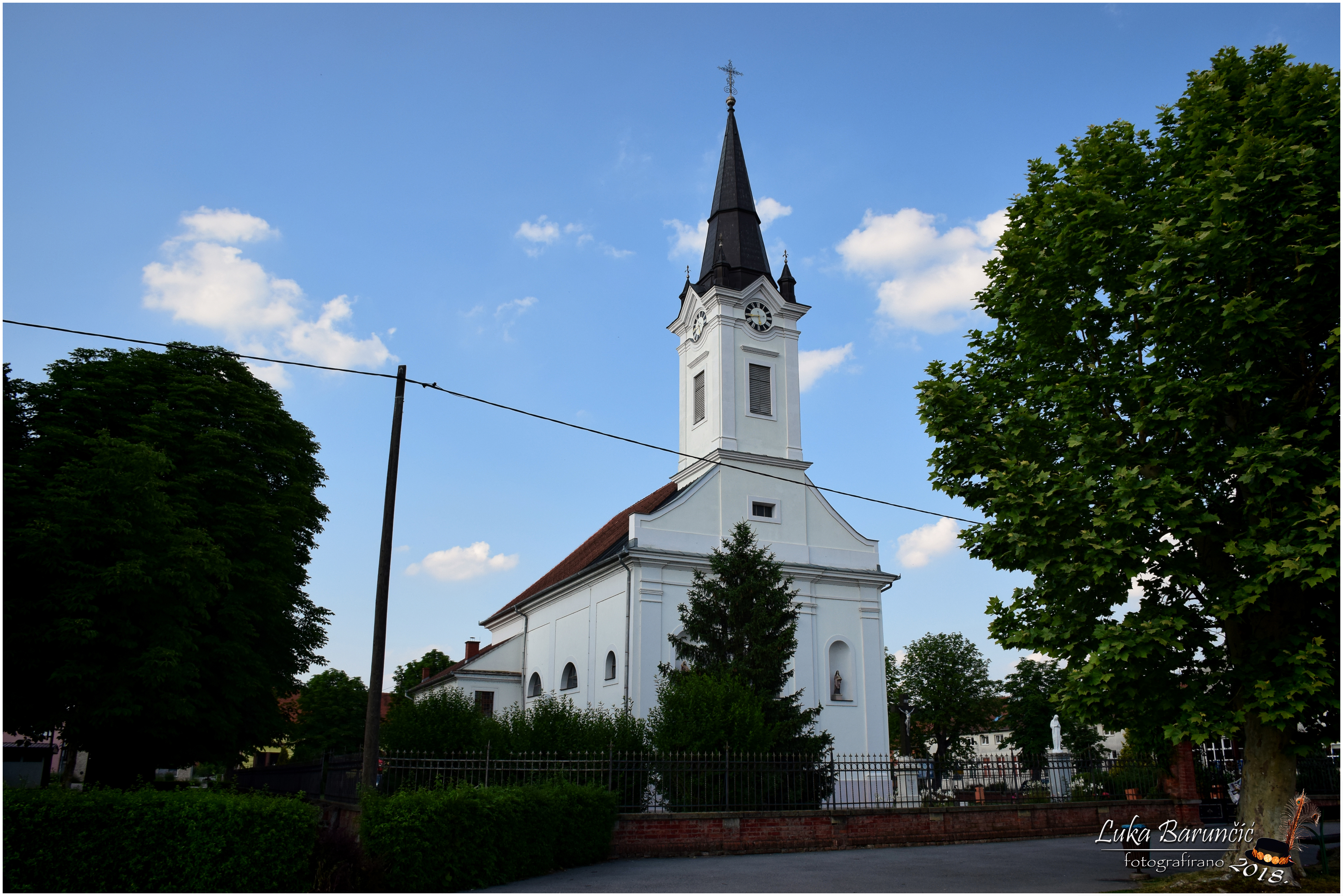
- St. Lawrence church in Babina Greda

- Flag Coat of arms
- Interactive map of Babina Greda
- Location within Croatia
- Coordinates: 45°07′N 18°32′E
- Country: Croatia
- County: Vukovar-Syrmia County

Government
  - Municipal mayor: Josip Krnić

Area
  - Municipality: 79.5 km^{2} (30.7 sq mi)
  - Urban: 79.5 km^{2} (30.7 sq mi)

Population (2021)
  - Municipality: 2,762
  - Density: 34.7/km^{2} (90.0/sq mi)
  - Urban: 2,762
  - Urban density: 34.7/km^{2} (90.0/sq mi)
- Time zone: UTC+1 (CET)
  - Summer (DST): UTC+2 (CEST)
- Postal code: 32270 Županja
- Area code: 32
- Website: babinagreda.hr

Babina Greda (Croatian pronunciation: [bâbina ɡrěːda] Hungarian: Babagerenda) is the only settlement in the eponymous municipality in Vukovar-Srijem County in eastern Croatia.

== Demographics ==
The 2011 census listed 3,572 inhabitants in Babina Greda. With pronounced issue of population decline in eastern Croatia caused by population ageing, effects of the Croatian War of Independence and post 2013 enlargement of the European Union emigration, the population of the municipality at the time of 2021 census dropped to 2,762.

Babina Greda: Population trends 1857–2021
v

population	3943	4221	4009	4016	3918	3973	3575	3641	4061	4611	4872	4620	4159	4205	4262	3572	2762
	1857	1869	1880	1890	1900	1910	1921	1931	1948	1953	1961	1971	1981	1991	2001	2011	2021

Sources: Croatian Bureau of Statistics publications

== Notable individuals ==
- Franjo Babić (1908–1945) – writer and journalist
- Mijat Stojanović (1818–1881) – ethnographer, educator, and folk writer
