= Franjo Babić =

Croatian writer and journalist

- Born: December 19, 1908; Babina Greda, Croatia-Slavonia, Austria-Hungary
- Disappeared: May 15, 1945 (aged 36); Maribor, Federal Slovenia, DF Yugoslavia
- Status: Missing for 81 years, 5 months and 28 days
- Occupations: Writer, journalist

Franjo Bartola Babić (19 December 1908 – 15 May 1945) was a Croatian writer and journalist.

== Background ==
Babić was born in Babina Greda. He finished elementary school in Zemun in 1919, and six grades of gymnasium in Vukovar and Vinkovci by 1926. Since 1929 he worked at the newspaper Hrvatski list in Osijek, and served as its editor-in-chief from 1941 to 1944.

He attended the trial of the bandit Čaruga, about whom he later wrote a book. From 1934 to 1943, Babić was active as a theater critic in Osijek. From 1932 on, he also wrote articles about chess.

He moved to Zagreb in 1944. During his attempt to escape to the western Allies in May 1945, he went missing near Maribor, where he was presumably killed in the Bleiburg repatriations.

== Works ==
- Općinski načelnik (comedy in two acts, 1937)
- Čaruga (serialized novel, 1938–1940)
- Vjerna zemlja (novel, 1943)
- Graničarska ljubav ili Ivka (play, 1944)

== See also ==
- List of people who disappeared mysteriously: 1910–1990
