= Moliço =

Submerged aquatic vegetation collected for use in agriculture

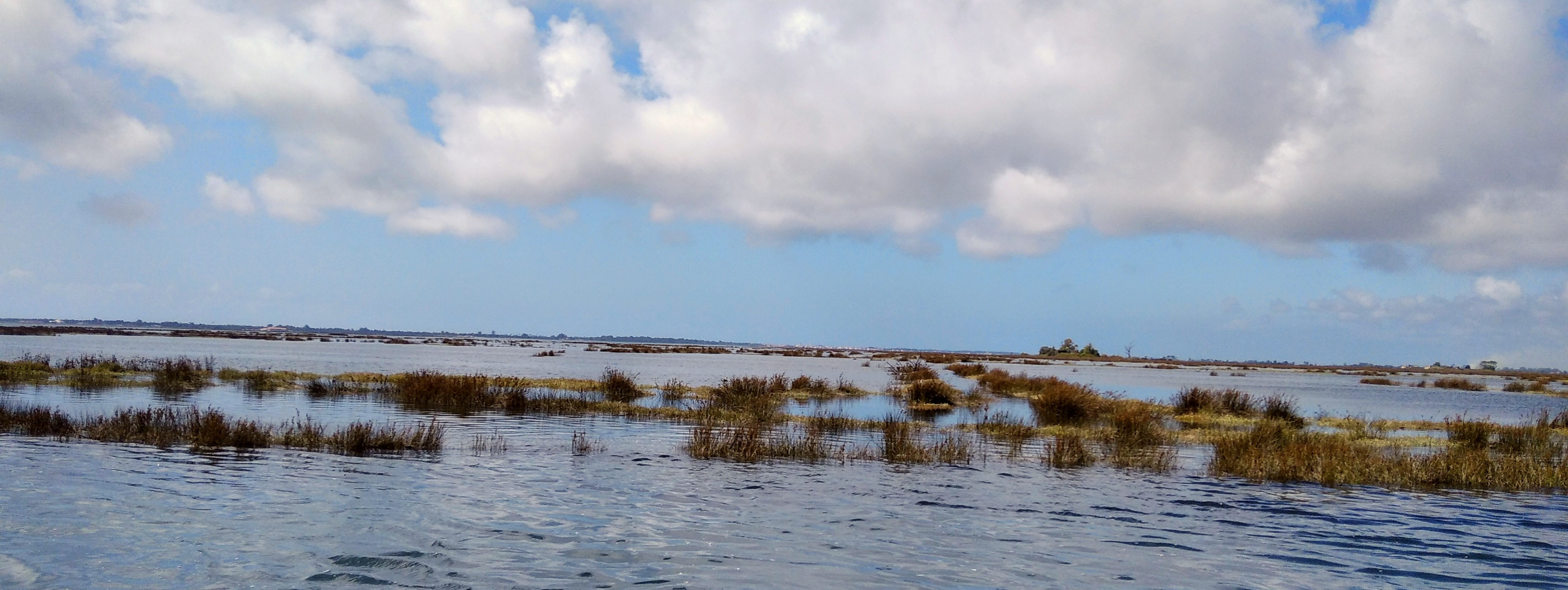
Moliço on the Ria de Aveiro

Moliço is submerged aquatic vegetation collected for use in Portuguese agriculture in moliceiro sailboats adapted to the shallow waters of the Ria de Aveiro lagoon.

The name is derived from Portuguese mole, "soft", from Latin mollis of the same meaning.

== Aquatic vegetation ==
Moliço is a community of vascular plants which grow in saline water.The most abundant plants were the seagrasses Zostera marina, Zostera angustifolia and Zostera noltei. Moliço could include other salt tolerant aquatic plants like Ruppia maritima and Potamogeton pectinatus. The vegetation provided cover for small fishes.

== Collection for agriculture ==
Moliço was particularly important in the coastal lagoon of Ria de Aveiro on the northern Portuguese coast. There in earlier centuries it was collected in large quantity by raking from sailboats called moliceiros. The material was used as a green manure for the thin sandy soils of the area, making them fertile enough for agriculture. The tradition is celebrated in the annual moliceiro festival.

In earlier centuries the collection of moliço played an important role in removing plant nutrients from the Ria de Aveiro, helping to stabilize this eutrophic lagoon.

The moliceiro is a long boat with a shallow draught to allow it to access the lagoon. It has become a symbol of the Ria de Aveiro area. The boat could be sailed or pushed with a pole. A boat could carry up to 7 tonnes of moliço. It was made of pinewood, and painted in a specific traditional style. They belong to the Mediterranean family of small bateira boats.

In 1911 the number of boats reached a peak of around 1500, collecting some 450 tonnes of moliço. By 1967, this had declined to some 600 boats, collecting around 150 tonnes of material. By 1979 the activity had collapsed, with few remaining boats.

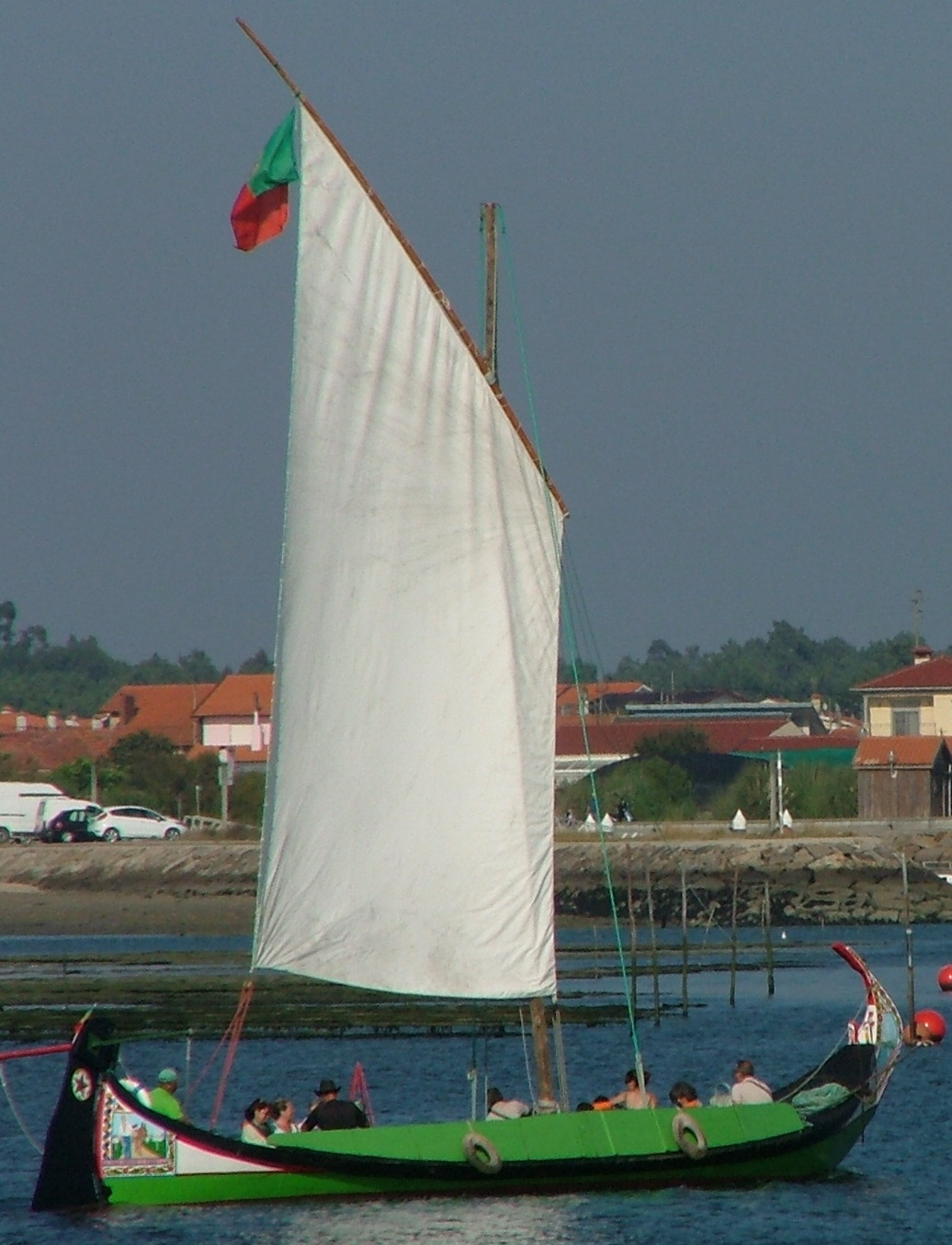
A moliceiro under sail

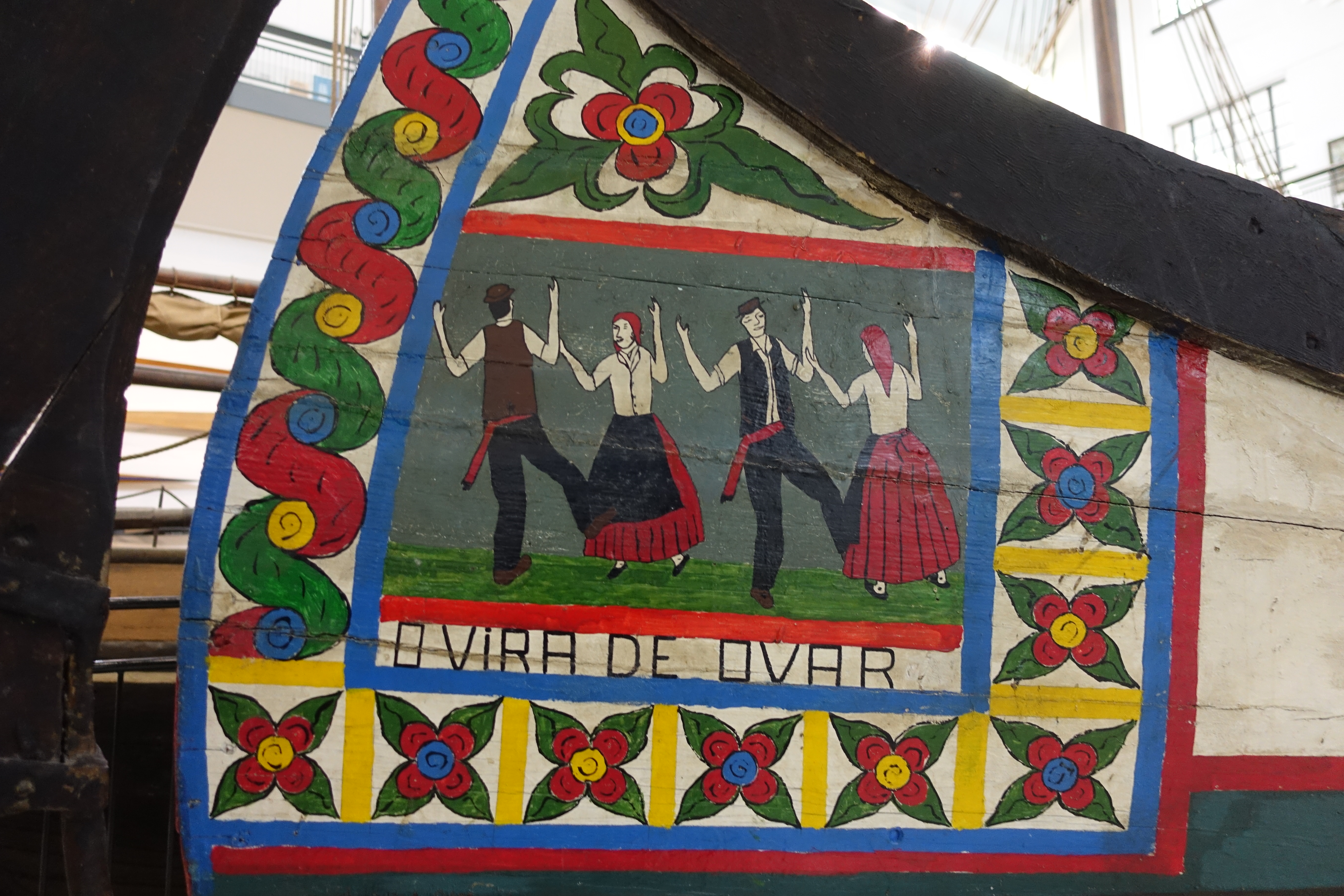
Traditional painted decoration of a moliceiro

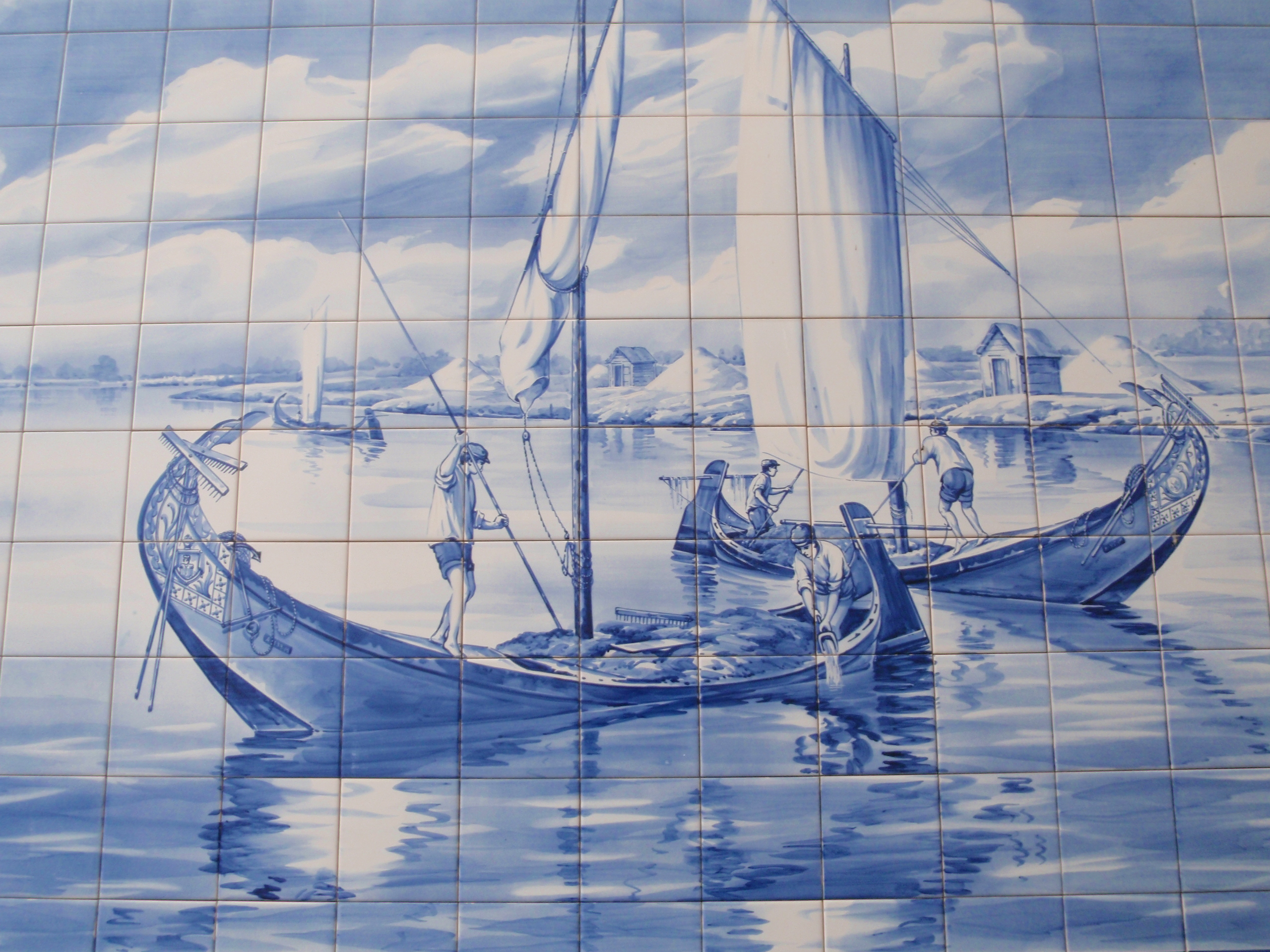
A depiction of moliceiros at work collecting moliço on the Ria de Aveiro
