= Ria de Aveiro =

Aveiro Lagoon
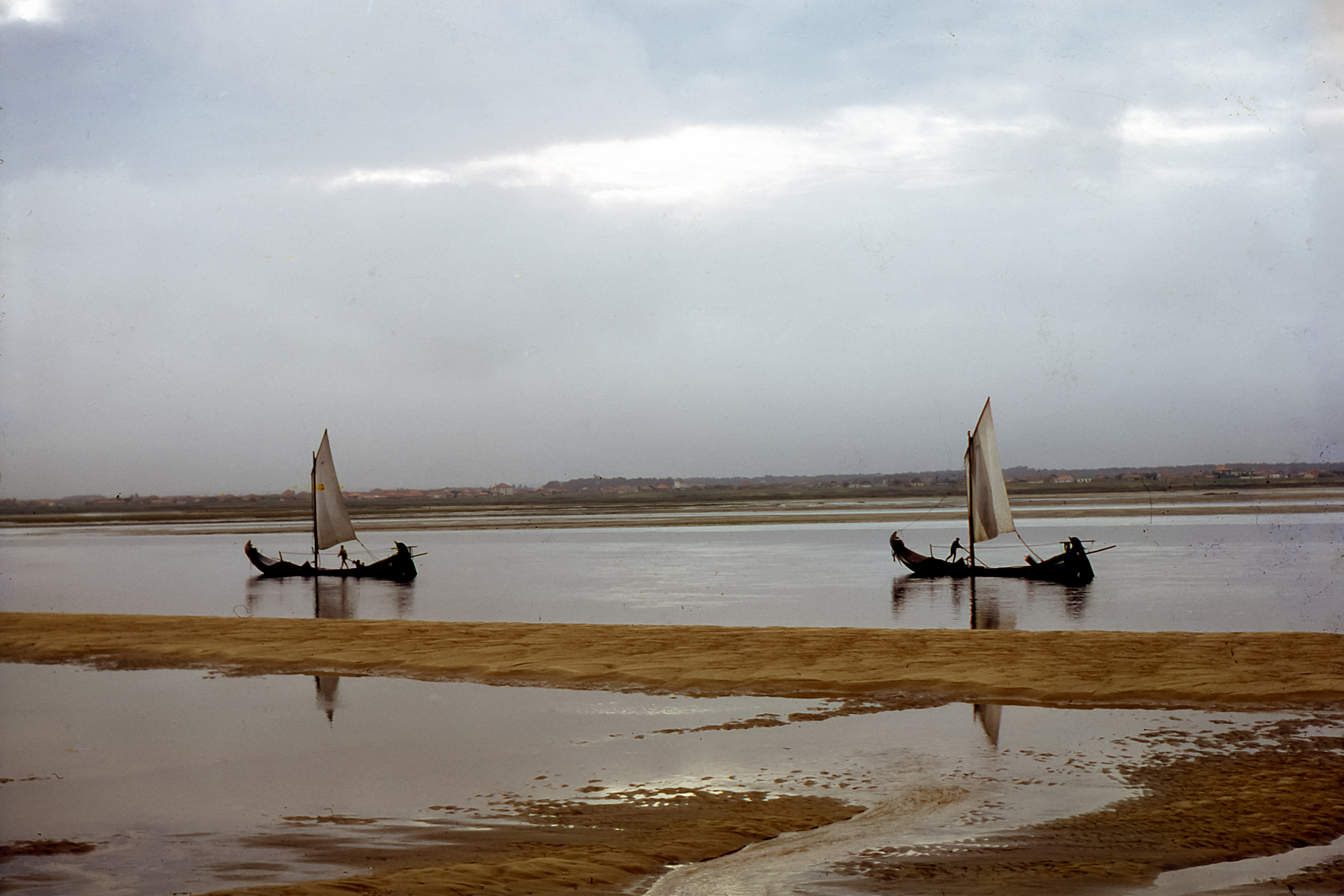
- A view of the Aveiro Lagoon

- Location within Portugal
- Location: Portugal
- Coordinates: 40°35′55.89″N 8°44′46.49″W
- Type: lagoon
- Max. length: 45 kilometres (28 mi)
- Surface area: 75 square kilometres (29 sq mi)

The Aveiro lagoon (Ria de Aveiro) is a lagoon in Portugal. It is located on the Atlantic coast of Portugal, south of the municipality of Espinho and north of Mira (to the north of the Cape Mondego). Its average area covers approximately 75 square kilometres (29 sq mi). It is named after the city of Aveiro, which is the chief urban centre located near to the lagoon. Other urban centres near the Ria de Aveiro are Ílhavo, Gafanha da Nazaré, Estarreja, Ovar and Esmoriz. Some beaches nearby include those of Barra, Costa Nova, Torreira, Vagueira, Furadouro, Cortegaça and Praia de Mira. There are also beaches in the São Jacinto Peninsula.

The 45-km long Aveiro Lagoon is one of Europe's last remaining untouched coastal marshlands. It is also a haven for numerous bird species. Tourism and aquaculture are the mainstay of the Aveiro Lagoon region. It is also renowned for its artisan fishing and as a center for the collection of flor de sal, an expensive salt variety.

== Conservation ==
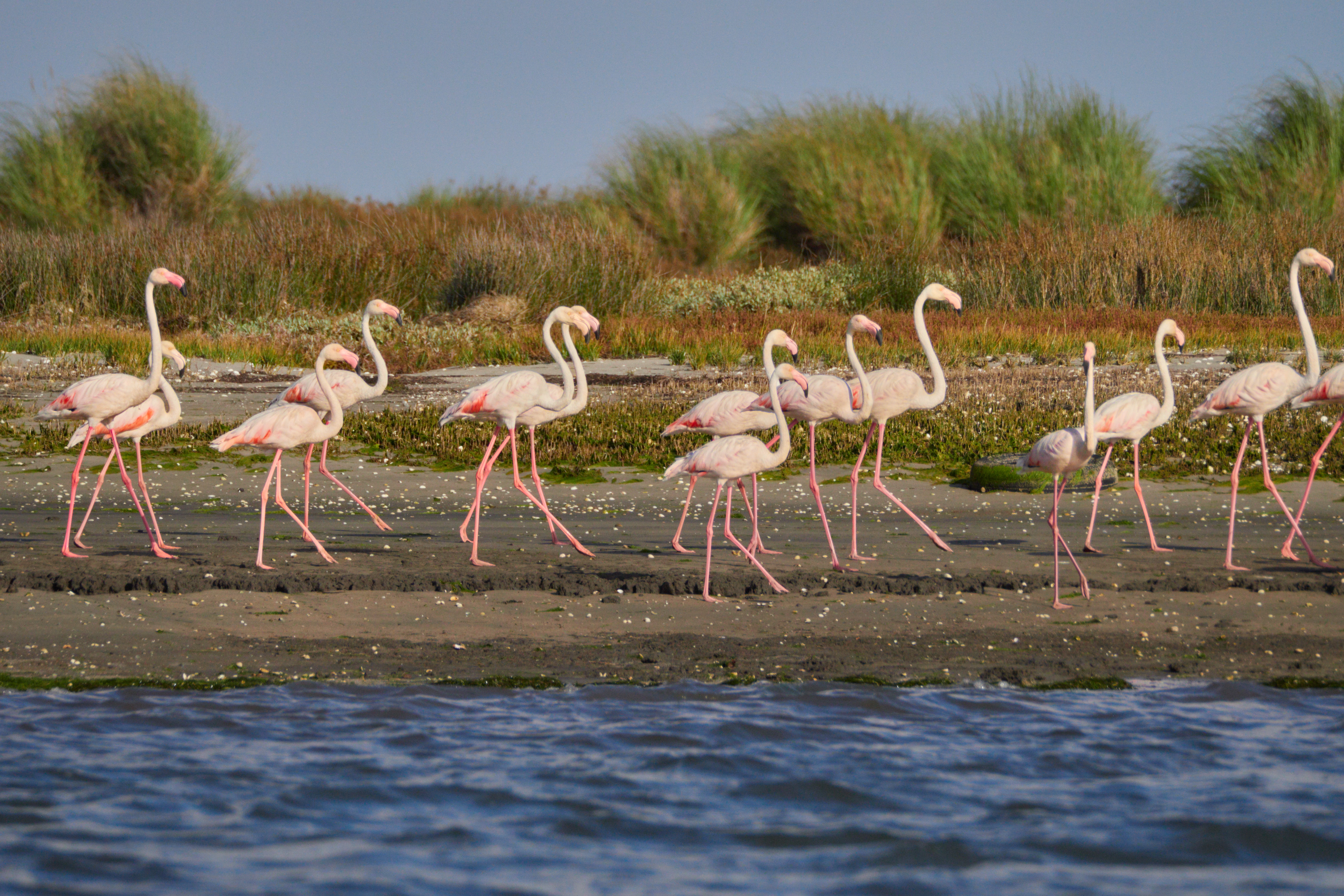
A flock of greater flamingos (Phoenicopterus roseus) standing on a sandbank at the Ria de Aveiro.

Ria de Aveiro is protected under the European Union's Natura 2000 network, under both the Habitats and the Birds Directives. Under the Birds Directive, it was designated a Special Protection Area (EU code PTZPEO004) in March 1988, based mainly on the importance of the area for waterbirds. More recently, in August 2014 it was also proposed as a Site of Community Importance, under Habitats Directive (EU code PTCON0061).
