= Tomás (footballer) =

Portuguese footballer

Personal information
- Full name: Tomás Manuel Lopes da Silva
- Date of birth: 8 September 1971 (age 55)
- Place of birth: Póvoa de Varzim, Portugal
- Height: 1.80 m (5 ft 11 in)
- Position: Goalkeeper

Youth career
- Varzim
- Benfica

Senior career*
| Years | Team | Apps | (Gls) |
- Trofense
- Felgueiras
- Chaves
- Fanhões
- Benfica
- Paços de Ferreira
- Varzim
- Felgueiras
- Paredes
- Espinho
- Bragança

International career
| 1988 | Portugal U16 | 1 | (0) |
| 1988 | Portugal U18 | 2 | (0) |
| 1992 | Portugal U21 | 2 | (0) |
- * Club domestic league appearances and goals

Tomás Manuel Lopes da Silva (born 8 September 1971), simply known as Tomás, is a former Portuguese professional footballer.

== Career ==
After retiring as a player, Tomás joined the technical team of Rio Ave.
