= Mijat Stojanović =

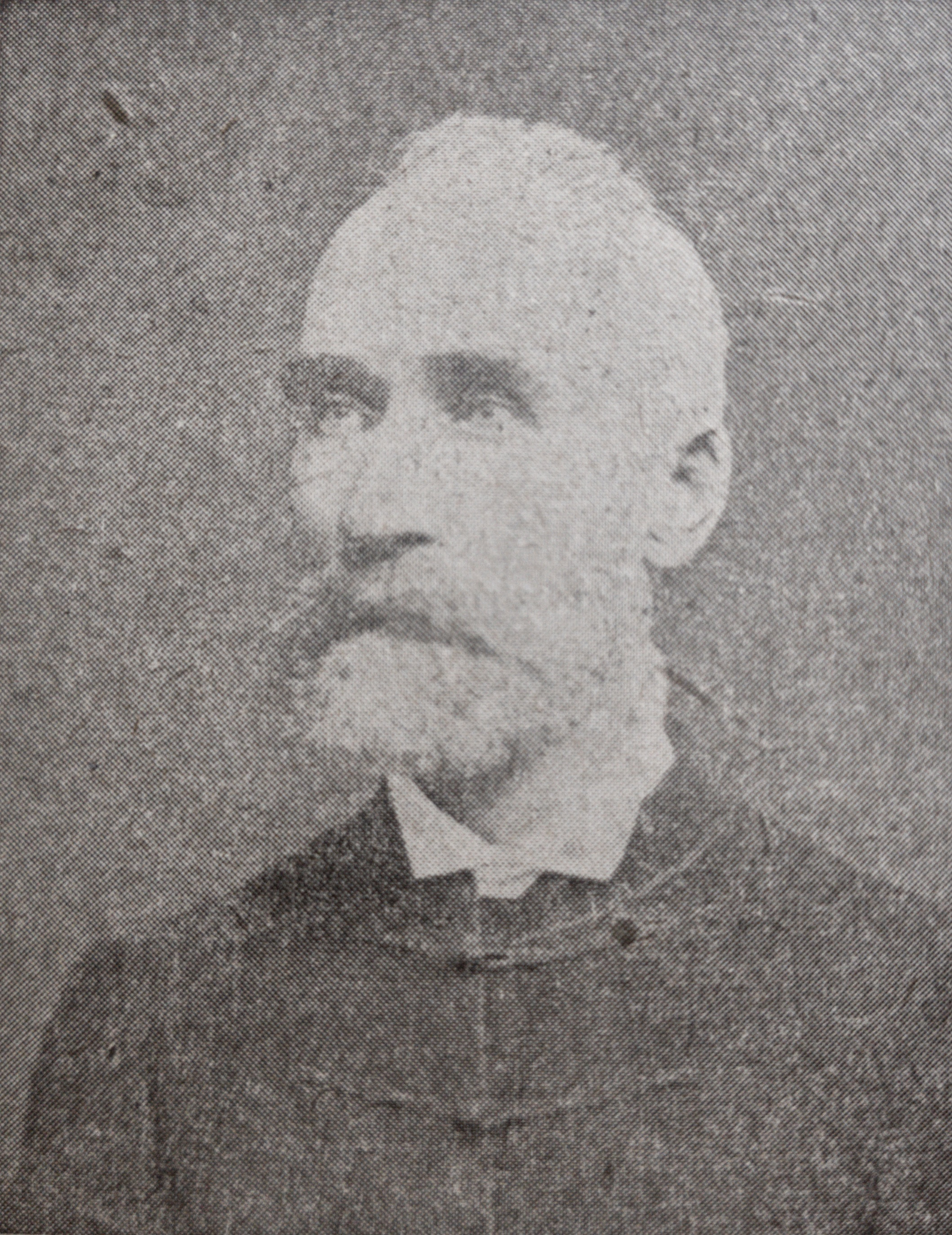
Mijat Stojanović

Mijat Stojanović (26 September 1818 – 18 September 1881) was a Croatian educator, ethnographer and folk writer.

Mijat Stojanović was born in Babina Greda, a municipality in the Vukovar-Srijem County in Croatia in 1818, and died in Zagreb in 1881. He was politically engaged, and fought against the dualist monarchy which was at the expense of Yugoslav people. He stood for co-operation of South Slavic peoples and the advanced ideas.

Elementary school in Babina Greda bears his name.
