= Jim Beattie (footballer) =

Scottish footballer

Personal information
- Date of birth: 16 February 1973 (age 53)
- Place of birth: Glasgow, Scotland
- Position: Left back

Youth career
- Celtic

Senior career*
| Years | Team | Apps | (Gls) |
| 1991–1993 | St Mirren | 26 | (0) |
| 1993 | MyPa | 1 | (0) |
| 1993–1994 | Ayr United | 3 | (0) |
| 1994–1995 | Albion Rovers | 26 | (0) |
- Petershill

International career
| 1992 | Scotland U21 | 4 | (0) |
- * Club domestic league appearances and goals

Jim Beattie (born 16 February 1973 in Glasgow) is a Scottish former professional footballer, who played for St Mirren, Ayr United and Albion Rovers in the Scottish Football League. He also played abroad in Finland for Premier League club MyPa.
