= Peter Gunda =

Slovak footballer

Personal information
- Date of birth: 3 July 1973 (age 53)
- Position: Defender

Senior career*
Years	Team	Apps	(Gls)
1990–1993	Nitra		
1993–1996	Sparta Prague		
1996	→ Dukla Banská Bystrica		
1996–1997	Jablonec		
1997	Viktoria Žižkov		
1997–1998	Slovan Bratislava		
2000–2001	DAC Dunajská Streda		
2001–2004	Eisenstadt		
2005–2006	Ritzing		
2005–2007	Nitra		

International career
- Slovakia U21
- * Club domestic league appearances and goals

Peter Gunda (born 3 July 1973) is a retired Slovak football defender.
