= Miguel Bruno =

Portuguese footballer

Personal information
- Full name: Miguel Bruno Pereira Cardoso
- Date of birth: 8 December 1971 (age 54)
- Place of birth: Ovar, Portugal
- Height: 1.81 m (5 ft 11 in)
- Position: Forward

Youth career
- 1985–1987: Arada
- 1987–1989: Feirense
- 1989–1990: Porto

Senior career*
Years	Team	Apps	(Gls)
1990–1991	Ovarense	41	(12)
1991–1992	Feirense	20	(6)
1992–1993	Paços de Ferreira	27	(3)
1993–1994	Beira-Mar	27	(3)
1994	Belenenses	6	(1)
1995	Gil Vicente	15	(0)
1995–1996	Salgueiros	16	(1)
1996–1997	Académica	30	(12)
1997–1998	Espinho	18	(3)
1998	Académica	9	(0)
1998–1999	Varzim	28	(6)
1999	Feirense	13	(1)
2000–2001	Ovarense	36	(9)
Total		286	(57)

International career
1989–1990	Portugal U18	12	(0)
1990	Portugal U20	1	(0)
1990–1993	Portugal U21	11	(7)
- * Club domestic league appearances and goals

Miguel Bruno Pereira Cardoso (born 8 December 1971) is a former Portuguese professional footballer.

== Career statistics ==
=== Club ===
Club	Season	League			Taça de Portugal		Other		Total	
Club	Season	Division	Apps	Goals	Apps	Goals	Apps	Goals	Apps	Goals
Ovarense	1990–91	Segunda Divisão B	41	12	6	0	0	0	47	12
Feirense	1991–92	Segunda Divisão de Honra	20	6	1	1	0	0	21	7
Paços de Ferreira	1992–93	Primeira Divisão	27	3	3	1	0	0	30	4
Beira-Mar	1993–94	Primeira Divisão	27	3	2	0	0	0	29	3
Belenenses	1994–95	Primeira Divisão	6	1	0	0	0	0	6	1
Gil Vicente	1994–95	Primeira Divisão	15	0	0	0	0	0	15	0
Salgueiros	1995–96	Primeira Divisão	16	1	1	0	0	0	17	1
Académica	1996–97	Segunda Divisão de Honra	30	12	2	0	0	0	32	12
Espinho	1997–98	Segunda Divisão de Honra	18	3	1	0	0	0	19	3
Académica	1997–98	Primeira Divisão	9	0	0	0	0	0	9	0
Varzim	1998–99	Segunda Divisão de Honra	28	6	1	0	0	0	29	6
Feirense	1999–00	Segunda Divisão B	13	1	1	0	0	0	14	1
Ovarense	1999–00	Segunda Divisão B	18	4	0	0	0	0	18	4
Ovarense	2000–01	Segunda Liga	18	5	1	0	0	0	19	5
Ovarense	Total		36	9	1	0	0	0	37	9
Career total			286	57	19	2	0	0	305	59
