= Jean-François Soucasse =

French footballer (born 1972)

Personal information
- Date of birth: 1 August 1972 (age 54)
- Place of birth: Toulouse, France
- Height: 1.78 m (5 ft 10 in)
- Position: Left-back

Youth career
- Lherm
- Muret

Senior career*
Years	Team	Apps	(Gls)
1991–1995	Toulouse	76	(0)
1995–1998	Saint-Étienne	53	(0)
1996–1997	→ Perpignan (loan)	30	(2)
1998–2000	Nîmes Olympique	48	(0)
Total		207	(2)

International career
1992	France U21	4	(0)
- * Club domestic league appearances and goals

Jean-François Soucasse (born 1 August 1972), is a French former footballer.

== Club career ==
Born in Toulouse, Soucasse started his career with local side Lherm, before joining Muret. He went on to represent a number of clubs in the two top French leagues, including Saint-Étienne, before joining Les Verts in a backroom staff role.

== International career ==
Soucasse represented France at under-21 level on four occasions in 1992.
