= Željko Tadić =

Montenegrin footballer (born 1974)

Personal information
- Date of birth: 9 June 1974 (age 52)
- Place of birth: Nikšić, SR Montenegro, SFR Yugoslavia
- Height: 1.94 m (6 ft 4 in)
- Position: Goalkeeper

Senior career*
Years	Team	Apps	(Gls)
1992–1994	Radnički Niš	33	(0)
1998–1999	Budućnost	1	(0)
1999–2000	Partizan	0	(0)
2001	XV de Piracicaba		
2001	Londrina		
2002	Bragantino		
2003	Weinheim		
2004	Uberaba	1	(0)
2004	Vasco	7	(0)
2006	Guarani-MG		
- * Club domestic league appearances and goals

Željko Tadić (born 9 June 1974) is a Montenegrin former professional footballer who played as a goalkeeper.

== Club career ==
Tadić was born in Nikšić, Montenegro, and was one of the Yugoslav players who moved to Brazil in 2001, when Dejan Petković was in good form. He played with Petković in 2001, when they were part of Radnički Niš' squad. Tadić moved from Partizan to XV de Piracicaba in 2001. He then moved in the same year to Londrina. His name was misspelled as Tandic by the Brazilian press. He defended Bragantino in 2002 and German club Weinheim in 2003.

The goalkeeper left Uberaba and joined Vasco da Gama in 2004, after a suggestion by the club's main star Dejan Petković. His performance in the Rio de Janeiro club was poor, he played seven Série A games and conceded 14 goals. He later sued the club for failing to pay his wages.

After leaving Vasco, he joined Guarani of Divinópolis. He then retired and worked as Dejan Petković's agent.
