= Cortegaça, Ovar =

Cortegaça
- Civil parish
- Location in Portugal
- Coordinates: 40.946°N 8.622°W
- Country: Portugal
- Region: Centro
- Intermunic. comm.: Região de Aveiro
- District: Aveiro
- Municipality: Ovar

Area
  - Total: 9.23 km^{2} (3.56 sq mi)

Population (2011)
  - Total: 3,837
  - Density: 420/km^{2} (1,100/sq mi)
- Time zone: UTC+00:00 (WET)
  - Summer (DST): UTC+01:00 (WEST)

Cortegaça is a small village and a civil parish in the Ovar Municipality, Portugal. The population in 2011 was 3,837, in an area of 9.23 km^{2} (3.56 sq mi).

It is a village dating back to the 9th and 10th centuries, associated with the repopulation of the lands of Santa Maria da Feira. Cortegaça belonged to the municipality of Feira (Santa Maria da Feira) but today belongs to the municipality of Ovar, becoming a village in 1985.

It has the first green area when travelling south of Porto, with a forest of 516 hectares, and the Buçaquinho Environmental Park. It's also known for having one of the most beautiful churches in Portugal, the Igreja de Santa Marinha de Cortegaça was built between 1910 and 1918. It is all covered by blue tiles from the 20th century and is flanked by an old cemetery, characterized by having a lot architectural styles, with a detach to neogotic style. It also have two palm trees in its churchyard, popular by their longevity and height. In 2018, some vestiges and bones from different ages were discovered near the church, including pieces of clay more than 3000 years old.

Cortegaça has two beaches - an urban beach (Santa Marinha of Cortegaça beach) and another, flanked by forest and dunes, named Maceda beach or South Cortegaça beach.

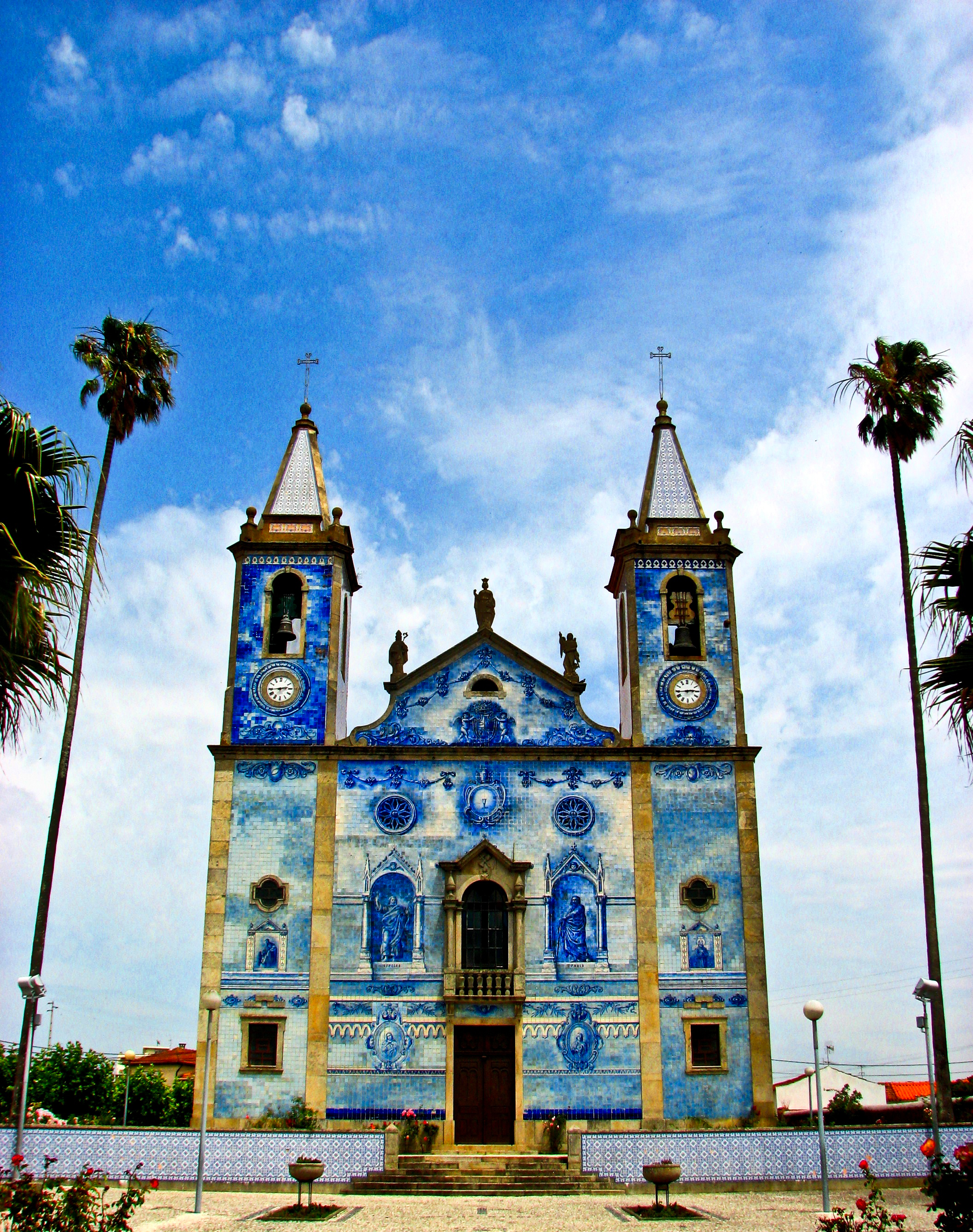

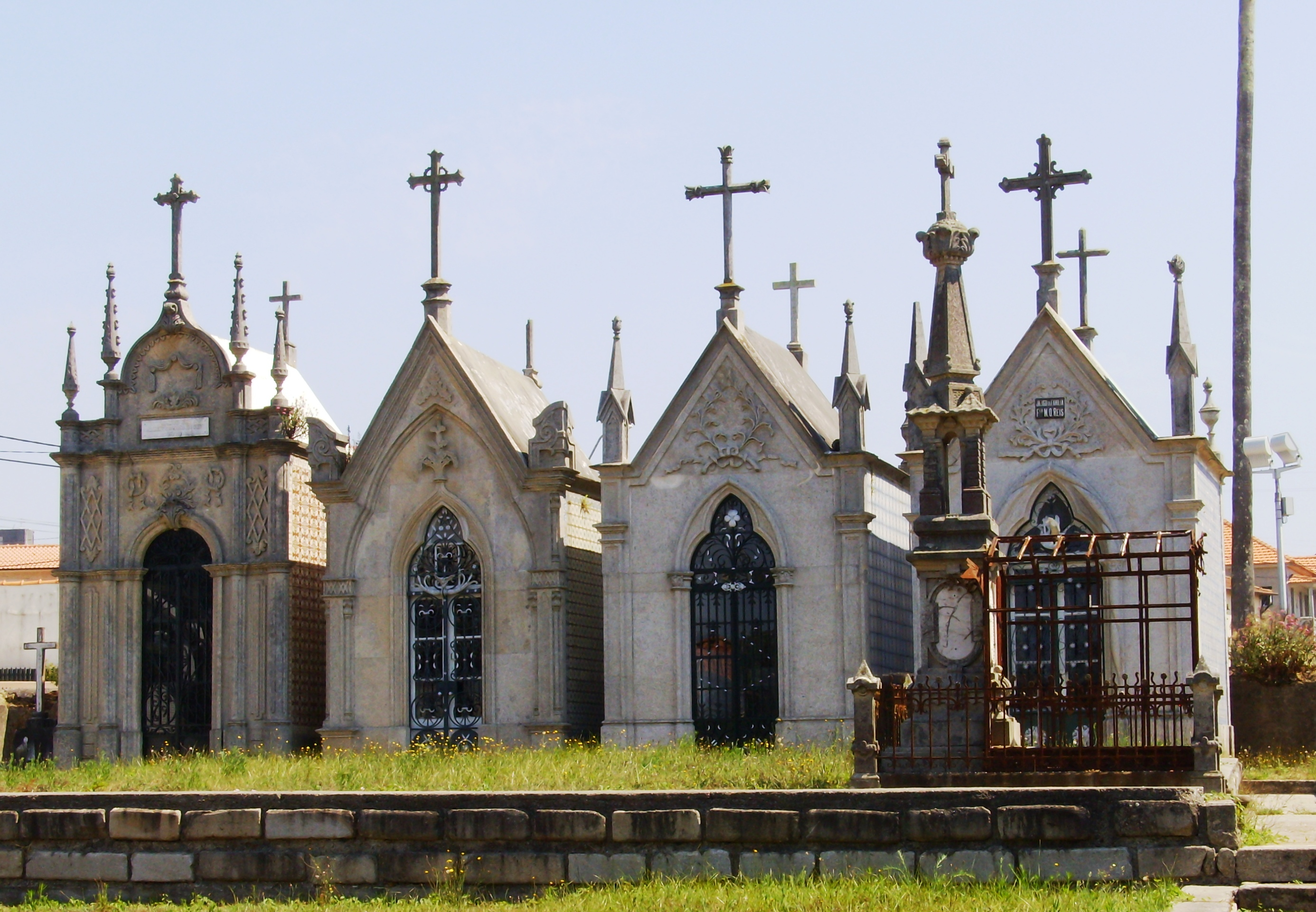
