= Mijatović =

Mijatović (Serbian Cyrillic: Мијатовић, pronounced [mîjaːtoʋitɕ, mijǎː-]) is a patronymic surname derived from the masculine given name Mijat. Notable people with this surname include:

- Aleksandar Mijatović (born 1982), Serbian footballer
- Andre Mijatović (born 1979), Croatian footballer
- Bojan Mijatović (born 1983), Spanish Marketing & Communications Director
- Boris Mijatović (born 1974), German politician
- Cvijetin Mijatović (1913–1992), Yugoslav politician
- Čedomilj Mijatović 1842–1932), Serbian politician
- Dario Mijatović (born 1984), Croatian footballer
- Elodie Lawton Mijatović (1825–1908), British author
- Jovan Mijatović (born 2005), Serbian footballer
- Mario Mijatović (born 1980), Croatian footballer
- Nenad Mijatović (born 1987), Montenegrin basketball player
- Predrag Mijatović (born 1969), Montenegrin footballer
- Rade Mijatović (born 1981), Montenegrin handball player
- Žarko Mijatović (1933–2011), Croatian actor
