= Chris Reid =

Scottish footballer

Personal information
- Date of birth: 4 November 1971 (age 54)
- Place of birth: Edinburgh, Scotland
- Height: 6 ft 2 in (1.88 m)
- Position: Goalkeeper

Youth career
- Hutchison Vale BC

Senior career*
| Years | Team | Apps | (Gls) |
| 1989–1998 | Hibernian | 35 | (0) |
| 1998–2000 | Hamilton Academical | 27 | (0) |
| 2000–2003 | Stirling Albion | 78 | (0) |
| Total | | 140 | (0) |

International career
| 1992 | Scotland U21 | 6 | (0) |
- * Club domestic league appearances and goals

Chris Reid (born 4 November 1971) is a Scottish former association football goalkeeper, who played for Hibernian, Hamilton Academical and Stirling Albion.

== Playing career ==
Reid spent nearly 10 years at Hibs, but only played in 35 league games as Hibs enjoyed the services of other goalkeepers, including Scotland internationals Andy Goram and Jim Leighton. Reid was an unused substitute as Hibs lost the 1993 Scottish League Cup Final to Rangers, with Leighton playing in goal.

He was linked with a move to Livingston in March 1998 but personal terms could not be agreed. Reid left Hibs in 1998 to sign for Hamilton Academical, but he suffered a bad injury on his debut for Hamilton. He left Hamilton in 2000 to sign for Stirling Albion. Reid played in 78 league matches in three seasons for Stirling. While with Hibs, he was capped by the Scotland national under-21 football team.
