= Vicente Cayetano Rodríguez =

Argentine football manager

- coach of Rosario Central in 1983.

Personal information
- Place of birth: Argentina

Managerial career
- Years: Team
- 1987: América
- 1992: Mexico
- 1995: Banfield
- 2002–2003: Haiti

Vicente Cayetano Rodríguez is an Argentine former football manager.

== Early life ==
He met Argentine manager César Luis Menotti in the 1960s. After that, he worked as his assistant manager.

== Career ==
In 1987, he was appointed manager of Mexican side América. He helped the club win the 1987 CONCACAF Champions' Cup. In 1992, he managed the Mexico national football team. In 1995, he was appointed manager of Argentine side Banfield. In 2002, he was appointed manager of the Haiti national football team.

== Personal life ==
He has been married. He is a native of Bahía Blanca, Argentine. He has been nicknamed "Cacho".
