= Benoît Chagnaud =

French footballer (born 1972)

Personal information
- Date of birth: 21 August 1972 (age 54)
- Place of birth: Évreux, France
- Height: 1.78 m (5 ft 10 in)
- Position: Forward

Senior career*
| Years | Team | Apps | (Gls) |
| 1987–1988 | Évreux AC | | |
| 1988–1995 | Le Havre | | |
| 1993–1994 | → AS Beauvais | | |
| 1995–1998 | Amiens | | |
| 1998–1999 | Le Mans | | |
| 1999–2000 | Grenoble | | |
| 2000–2005 | L'Entente SSG | | |
| 2005–2008 | Arras FA | | |
- * Club domestic league appearances and goals

Benoît Chagnaud (born 21 August 1972) is a French former football forward.
