= Robert Neumann (footballer) =

Czech footballer

Personal information
- Date of birth: 8 October 1972 (age 54)
- Place of birth: Czechoslovakia
- Height: 1.79 m (5 ft 10 in)
- Position: Midfielder

Youth career
- Hostivař
- Bohemians 1905

Senior career*
Years	Team	Apps	(Gls)
1990–1995	Bohemians 1905		
1995–1999	FK Jablonec		
1999–2002	FC Slovan Liberec		
- * Club domestic league appearances and goals

Robert Neumann (born 8 October 1972) is a Czech former football player. He played in the top flight of his country, making more than 240 appearances spanning the existence of the Czechoslovak First League and the Gambrinus liga.

== Honours ==
=== Club ===
Slovan Liberec

- Czech Cup: 1999–2000
- Gambrinus liga: 2001–02
