= Esmoriz =

- Civil parish
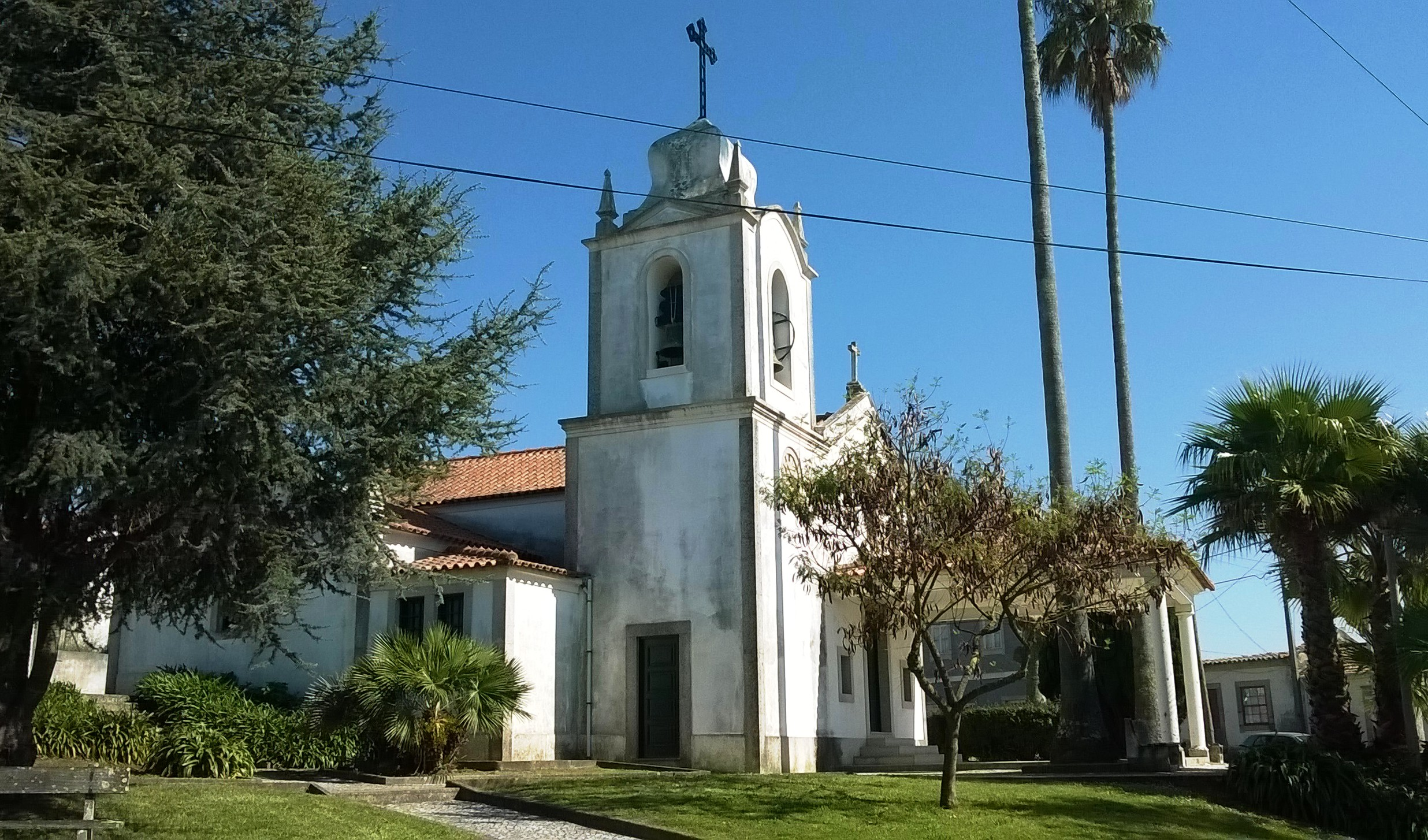

- Location in Portugal
- Coordinates: 40.955°N 8.627°W
- Country: Portugal
- Region: Centro
- Intermunic. comm.: Região de Aveiro
- District: Aveiro
- Municipality: Ovar

Area
  - Total: 9.17 km^{2} (3.54 sq mi)

Population (2011)
  - Total: 11,448
  - Density: 1,250/km^{2} (3,230/sq mi)
- Time zone: UTC+00:00 (WET)
  - Summer (DST): UTC+01:00 (WEST)

Esmoriz (Portuguese pronunciation: [ɨʒmuˈɾiʃ]) is a Portuguese city located 25 kilometers (16 mi) south of Porto. It is a freguesia ("parish") of the municipality of Ovar, and part of the Região de Aveiro. The population in 2011 was 11,448, in an area of 9.17 km^{2}. Esmoriz was given city status in 1993.

== Geography ==
The city is divided into 3 main sectors, the urban sector, the beach and the forest. However, the city is composed mainly of urban elements. The urban sector is home to mostly middle to upper-middle-class families, and the most regular house types are Apartments, usually in 3-story apartment buildings. Small businesses are common, such as greengrocers and convenience stores spread throughout the city, but there are also large commercial infrastructures such as Pingo Doce, Continente, Minipreço and Intermarché. Several bookstores and IT equipment shops are available, with the occasional barber shop and fashion store available. Despite the urbanized theme that characterizes Esmoriz, several green spaces are spread throughout the city. The forest sector is hardly inhabited and mostly constituted by pine woods. This area comprises half of the Buçaquinho Environmental Park, shared with the neighboring town of Cortegaça. The beach sector of Esmoriz is a common touristic hotspot in the region during the summer, and encompasses the "Pinhal D'aberta", a mostly residential area that harbours the most luxurious houses and summer homes in the city.

== Education ==
Esmoriz is served by several primary schools, a 2nd and 3rd cycle School (Portuguese 5th to 9th grade) and a Secondary School.

There are 4 primary schools in Esmoriz: Escola da Relva, Torre, Praia, Vinha.

The Florbela Espanca 2nd and 3rd cycle school was founded on 1 April 1975. For the first 13 years of it existence, the school was located at Rua do Solar dos Castanheiros (former summer home of poet Florbela Espanca. The building currently houses the local library). In 1988, the school moved to its current location in Rua Nova. The Esmoriz Secondary School was inaugurated in 1996 and currently provides schooling to students from 8th to 12th grade.

== Sports ==
The S.C. Esmoriz football club is the city's official football team, and the official stadium is Estádio da Barrinha, which has a capacity for 2500 people. The backbone of the team are the youth players which comprise the majority of it. It also has a volleyball team, Esmoriz Ginásio Clube, usually sponsored by local companies and being housed in the local sports complex. This complex also houses a gym, which provides a wide range of physical activities, from martial arts to the aforementioned volleyball. This club is the main organizer of TIVE - Torneio Internacional de Voleibol de Esmoriz (International Volleyball Tournament of Esmoriz), usually held the week before Easter Sunday, which gather youth volleyball teams from dozens of countries.

== Transport ==
Esmoriz is served by major roads to other nearby cities: Ovar, Espinho, Feira, São João da Madeira, Vila Nova de Gaia, Porto and Aveiro. The city also has a train station that is part of the Aveiro train line, which connects to Porto and Aveiro, and other major cities along the way, such as Gaia, Espinho, Ovar and Estarreja. This line is part of the Porto Urban Transports train network, which connects to most other major cities in the North of the country.
