= Grégory Meilhac =

French footballer (born 1971)

Personal information
- Date of birth: 5 September 1971 (age 55)
- Place of birth: Ganges
- Position: Forward

Senior career*
Years	Team	Apps	(Gls)
1991–1994	Nîmes Olympique		
1994–1996	Grenoble Foot 38		
1996–1997	Nîmes Olympique		
1999–2000	KRC Harelbeke		
2000–2003	Gallia Club Lunel		
- * Club domestic league appearances and goals

Grégory Meilhac (born 5 September 1971) is a retired French football striker.
