= Sretko Vuksanović =

Bosnian footballer and manager

Personal information
- Date of birth: 15 February 1973 (age 53)
- Place of birth: Sarajevo, SFR Yugoslavia
- Position: Midfielder

Team information
- Current team: FK Romanija (manager)

Youth career
- 1980–1989: FK Sarajevo

Senior career*
Years	Team	Apps	(Gls)
1990–1992	FK Sarajevo	40	(2)
1992–1994	Sochaux	39	(5)
1994–1996	AA Gent	41	(11)
1996–1997	Genk	20	(6)
1997–1999	Cappellen	30	(3)
1999–2002	Pau	33	(14)
2002–2003	Toulon	18	(0)
2003–2004	Željezničar Sarajevo	29	(6)
2004–2009	Slavija Sarajevo	107	(29)
Total		351	(82)

Managerial career
- 2012–2014: FK Romanija
- * Club domestic league appearances and goals

Sretko Vuksanović (Serbian Cyrillic: Сретко Вуксановић; born 15 February 1973) is a Bosnian retired professional football player and manager.

== Playing career ==
Vuksanović started his playing career with FK Sarajevo, before transferring to city rivals FK Željezničar in 1991. With the start of the Bosnian war he made a move to Ligue 1 side Sochaux. He also played for Gent, Genk and Cappellen in the Belgian Pro League, and Pau FC and Sporting Toulon in France. After a short stint with Željezničar in 2004, he joined FK Slavija Sarajevo where he concluded his career in 2009.

== Managerial career ==
In 2012, Vuksanović was named manager of Republika Srpska team FK Romanija.
