= 1992–93 FK Partizan season =

Partizan
1992–93 season
- President: Ivan Ćurković
- Head coach: Ljubiša Tumbaković
- First League of FR Yugoslavia: Winners
- FR Yugoslavia Cup: Runners-up
- Top goalscorer: League: Predrag Mijatović; All: Ljubomir Vorkapić

The 1992–93 season was the 47th season in FK Partizan's existence. This article shows player statistics and matches that the club played during the 1992–93 season.

== Players ==
=== Squad information ===
Players (league matches/league goals)

- (Federal Republic of Yugoslavia) Goran Pandurović
- (Bosnia and Herzegovina) Nikola Damjanac
- (North Macedonia) Vujadin Stanojković
- (Bosnia and Herzegovina) Nebojša Gudelj
- (Federal Republic of Yugoslavia) Slaviša Jokanović
- (Federal Republic of Yugoslavia) Gordan Petrić
- (Federal Republic of Yugoslavia) Budimir Vujačić
- (Federal Republic of Yugoslavia) Vuk Rašović
- (Federal Republic of Yugoslavia) Goran Bogdanović
- (Federal Republic of Yugoslavia) Petar Vasiljević
- (Federal Republic of Yugoslavia) Albert Nađ
- (Federal Republic of Yugoslavia) Bratislav Mijalković
- (Slovenia) Zlatko Zahovič
- (Federal Republic of Yugoslavia) Dragan Ćirić
- (Federal Republic of Yugoslavia) Ljubomir Vorkapić
- (Federal Republic of Yugoslavia) Branko Brnović
- (Federal Republic of Yugoslavia) Slobodan Krčmarević
- (Federal Republic of Yugoslavia) Savo Milošević
- (Federal Republic of Yugoslavia) Đorđe Tomić
- (Federal Republic of Yugoslavia) Slobodan Milanović
- (Federal Republic of Yugoslavia) Dejan Rađenović
- (Federal Republic of Yugoslavia) Blažo Pešikan
- (Federal Republic of Yugoslavia) Dejan Tasić

== Competitions ==
=== First League of FR Yugoslavia ===
Pos	Team	Pld	W	D	L	GF	GA	GD	Pts	Qualification or relegation
1	Partizan (C)	36	31	3	2	103	20	+83	65	Placed in the Autumn IA league
2	Red Star	36	19	13	4	70	25	+45	51	Placed in the Autumn IA league
3	Vojvodina	36	19	8	9	72	47	+25	46	Placed in the Autumn IA league
4	Zemun	36	16	8	12	62	48	+14	40	Placed in the Autumn IA league
5	Rad	36	13	13	10	47	35	+12	39	Placed in the Autumn IA league

Rules for classification: 1) points; 2) goal difference; 3) number of goals scored.
(C) Champions

==== Matches ====
23 August 1992 1	Zemun	1–2	Partizan	Belgrade
			Jokanović; Mijatović (pen.)

30 August 1992 2	Partizan	2–0	Vojvodina	Belgrade
	Stanojković; Marković			Stadium: JNA Stadium

6 September 1992 3	Partizan	4–0	Mogren	Belgrade
	Petrić 3'; Mijatović 18'; Brnović; Krčmarević			Stadium: JNA Stadium

13 September 1992 4	Partizan	2–0	OFK Kikinda	Belgrade
	Krčmarević; Mijatović			Stadium: JNA Stadium

20 September 1992 5	Priština	0–2	Partizan	Priština
			Jokanović 17'; Krčmarević 39'	Attendance: 12,000

27 September 1992 6	Partizan	2–1	Bečej	Belgrade
	Vorkapić			Stadium: JNA Stadium

2 October 1992 7	Crvena zvezda	1–1	Partizan	Belgrade
	Lukić 87'		Mijatović 75'	Stadium: Marakana; Attendance: 80,000

11 October 1992 8	Partizan	4–0	Sutjeska	Belgrade
	Krčmarević 5'; Vorkapić 24'; Jokanović 54', 64'			Stadium: JNA Stadium

18 October 1992 9	OFK Beograd	0–4	Partizan	Belgrade
			Vorkapić; Krčmarević; Jokanović

25 October 1992 10	Partizan	4–0	Radnički Jugopetrol	Belgrade
	Brnović 23'; Mijatović 28'; Vorkapić 58'; Vujačić 80'			Stadium: JNA Stadium

1 November 1992 11	Proleter Zrenjanin	1–2	Partizan	Zrenjanin
			Milošević; Mijatović

8 November 1992 12	Partizan	2–0	Radnički Niš	Belgrade
	Jokanović 33', 51' (pen.)			Stadium: JNA Stadium

22 November 1992 13	Spartak Subotica	2–2	Partizan	Subotica
			Bogdanović 30'; Milošević 47'

29 November 1992 14	Partizan	10–1	Napredak Kruševac	Belgrade
	Mijatović; Krčmarević (pen.); Stanojković; Milošević; Bogdanović; Brnović; Jokanović			Stadium: JNA Stadium

2 December 1992 15	Hajduk Kula	0–3	Partizan	Kula
			Gagić (a.g.); Nađ; Milošević

6 December 1992 16	Budućnost Podgorica	3–2	Partizan	Podgorica
			Vujačić; Milošević

9 December 1992 17	Partizan	3–0	Rad	Belgrade
	Milošević 32'; Gudelj 37'; Jokanović 68'			Stadium: JNA Stadium

12 December 1992 18	Borac Banja Luka	0–3	Partizan	Banja Luka
			Milošević; Brnović

28 February 1993 19	Partizan	1–0	Priština	Belgrade
	Vorkapić 2'			Stadium: JNA Stadium

7 March 1993 20	Vojvodina	0–1	Partizan	Novi Sad
			Vorkapić 14'

7 March 1993 21	Mogren	1–3	Partizan	Budva
			Milošević; Brnović 49'; Stanojković	Attendance: 2,500

21 March 1993 22	OFK Kikinda	0–2	Partizan	Kikinda
			Mijatović; Milošević 90'	Attendance: 4,000

4 April 1993 23	Bečej	1–4	Partizan	Bečej
			Vujačić 34'; Vorkapić 47'; Krčmarević 50'; Jokanović 54'	Stadium: 2,500

10 April 1993 24	Partizan	1–0	Crvena zvezda	Belgrade
	Mijatović 45'			Stadium: JNA Stadium; Attendance: 40,000

18 April 1993 25	Sutjeska	0–5	Partizan	Nikšić
			Vorkapić; Gudelj; Milošević; Ćirić

25 April 1993 26	Partizan	5–1	OFK Beograd	Belgrade
	Zahovič 5', 51'; Brnović 29'; Vorkapić 30'; Jokanović			Stadium: JNA Stadium

28 April 1993 27	Partizan	5–1	Zemun	Belgrade
	Milošević 14'; Mijatović 31', 55'; Stanojković 39'; Vorkapić 58'			Stadium: JNA Stadium

2 May 1993 28	Radnički Jugopetrol	1–3	Partizan	Belgrade
			Mijatović 20' (pen.); Milošević 44'; Stanojković

9 May 1993 29	Partizan	4–1	Proleter Zrenjanin	Belgrade
	Vorkapić; Vujačić; Milošević; Mijatović			Stadium: JNA Stadium

15 May 1993 30	Radnički Niš	1–1	Partizan	Niš
			Vorkapić

23 May 1993 31	Partizan	3–0	Spartak Subotica	Belgrade
	Mijatović; Brnović			Stadium: JNA Stadium

15 May 1993 32	Napredak Kruševac	0–1	Partizan	Kruševac
			Jokanović 81' (pen.)

6 June 1993 33	Partizan	4–1	Hajduk Kula	Belgrade
	Krčmarević; Vorkapić; Jokanović			Stadium: JNA Stadium

9 June 1993 34	Partizan	3–1	Borac Banja Luka	Belgrade
	Krčmarević; Mijalković; Zahovič			Stadium: JNA Stadium

13 June 1993 35	Partizan	3–0	Budućnost Podgorica	Belgrade
	Pandurović 18' (pen.); Vasiljević 70'; Tomić 89' (pen.)			Stadium: JNA Stadium

20 June 1993 36	Rad	1–0	Partizan	Belgrade

=== FR Yugoslavia Cup ===
16 August 1992 Round of 32	Rudar Pljevlja	1–4	Partizan	Pljevlja
			Krčmarević 8' (pen.); Stanojković; Vorkapić 50'; Jokanović

9 September 1992 Round of 16 1st leg	Mladost Lučani	1–2	Partizan	Lučani

29 September 1992 Round of 16 2nd leg	Partizan	4–0 (6–1 agg.)	Mladost Lučani	Belgrade
	Brnović 19', 34'; Vorkapić 39'; Jokanović 54'			Stadium: JNA Stadium

28 October 1992 Quarter finals 1st leg	Novi Sad	1–1	Partizan	Novi Sad

4 November 1992 Quarter finals 2nd leg	Partizan	4–1 (5–2 agg.)	Novi Sad	Belgrade
	Krčmarević; Milošević 23'; Jokanović 58'; Brnović 60'			Stadium: JNA Stadium

10 March 1993 Semi finals 1st leg	Zastava Kragujevac	0–4	Partizan	Kragujevac
			Mijatović 13'; Milošević 38'; Vorkapić 42', 85'	Attendance: 20,000

14 April 1993 Semi finals 2nd leg	Partizan	2–0 (6–0 agg.)	Zastava Kragujevac	Belgrade
	Milošević 53'; Jokanović 64'			Stadium: JNA Stadium

8 May 1993 Final 1st leg	Partizan	1–0	Crvena zvezda	Belgrade
	Zahovič 29'			Stadium: JNA Stadium; Attendance: 30,000; Referee: Radisav Rabrenović

15 May 1993 Final 2nd leg	Crvena zvezda	1–0 (1–1 agg.) (5 – 4 p)	Partizan	Belgrade
	Drobnjak 50'			Stadium: Marakana; Attendance: 50,000; Referee: Zdravko Jokić
	Penalties
	Ivić (penalty scored); Vidaković (penalty scored); Vasilijević (penalty scored); Stojkovski (penalty scored); Simeunović (penalty scored)		(penalty scored) Jokanović; (penalty scored) Krčmarević; (penalty missed) Mijatović; (penalty scored) Gudelj; (penalty scored) Milošević

== See also ==
- List of FK Partizan seasons
