= 1991–92 FK Partizan season =

Partizan 1991–92 football season

Partizan
1991–92 season
- President: Ivan Ćurković
- Head coach: Ivica Osim
- Yugoslav First League: Runners-up
- Yugoslav Cup: Winners
- UEFA Cup: First Round
- Top goalscorer: League: All: Predrag Mijatović

The 1991–92 season was the 46th season in FK Partizan's existence. This article shows player statistics and matches that the club played during the 1991–92 season.

== Competitions ==
=== Yugoslav First League ===
Pos	Team	Pld	W	PKW	PKL	L	GF	GA	GD	Pts
1	Red Star Belgrade (C)	33	23	4	1	5	77	24	+53	50
2	Partizan	33	21	4	6	2	59	18	+41	46
3	Vojvodina	33	19	4	1	9	45	31	+14	42
4	OFK Beograd	33	19	3	5	6	62	36	+26	41
5	Proleter Zrenjanin	33	16	3	1	13	41	43	−2	35

Source: rsssf.org
Rules for classification: 1) points; 2) goal difference; 3) number of goals scored.
(C) Champion

18 August 1991 1	Velež	1–0	Partizan	Mostar

21 August 1991 2	Partizan	1–0	Sutjeska Nikšić	Belgrade
				Stadium: JNA Stadium

25 August 1991 3	Partizan	1–0	Vojvodina	Belgrade
	Vorkapić 30'			Stadium: JNA Stadium

1 September 1991 4	Radnički Niš	1–3	Partizan	Niš
	Jakšić 41'		Miletić 49'; Vujačić 81'; Gudelj 83'	Stadium: Čair Stadium; Attendance: 10,000

8 September 1991 5	Partizan	0–0 (2–1 p)	Spartak Subotica	Belgrade
				Stadium: JNA Stadium

14 September 1991 6	Borac Banja Luka	0–1	Partizan	Banja Luka
			Vorkapić 68'

22 September 1991 7	Partizan	2–2 (3–4 p)	Crvena zvezda	Belgrade
	Novak 29'; Mijatović 63'		Pančev 18'; Mihajlović 83'	Stadium: JNA Stadium; Attendance: 20,000

29 September 1991 8	Željezničar	1–1 (5–4 p)	Partizan	Sarajevo

6 October 1991 9	Partizan	2–0	Vardar	Belgrade
				Stadium: JNA Stadium

10 October 1991 10	Pelister	0–2	Partizan	Bitola

20 October 1991 11	Partizan	4–1	Proleter Zrenjanin	Belgrade
	Mijatović 43' (pen.) 50', ?'; Bogdanović 86'		Jošić 5'	Stadium: JNA Stadium

26 October 1991 12	Sloboda Tuzla	0–1	Partizan	Tuzla
			Krčmarević 67'

3 November 1991 13	Partizan	2–0	Budućnost	Belgrade
	Zahovič ?'; Vorkapić ?'			Stadium: JNA Stadium

17 November 1991 14	OFK Beograd	0–6	Partizan	Belgrade
			Bogdanović 10'; Mijatović ?'; Krčmarević 50'; Gudelj ?'; Stanojković ?'; Novak 70'

24 November 1991 15	Partizan	3–1	Zemun	Belgrade
	Mijatović 18'; Vorkapić 28'; Zahovič 44'		Mihić 16'	Stadium: JNA Stadium

1 December 1991 16	Partizan	1–0	Rad	Belgrade
				Stadium: JNA Stadium

8 December 1991 17	Sarajevo	0–0	Partizan	Sarajevo

16 February 1992 18	Sutjeska Nikšić	1–2	Partizan	Nikšić
	Jovičić 60'		Krčmarević 8'; Novak 54'

23 February 1992 19	Partizan	3–1	Velež	Belgrade
				Stadium: JNA Stadium

1 March 1992 20	Vojvodina	2–1	Partizan	Novi Sad

8 March 1992 21	Partizan	1–1 (4–3 p)	Radnički Niš	Belgrade
	Jokanović ?' (pen.)		Vulevski ?' (pen.)	Stadium: JNA Stadium

12 March 1992 22	Spartak Subotica	0–1	Partizan	Subotica

15 March 1992 23	Partizan	2–0	Borac Banja Luka	Belgrade
	Stanojković 26'; Šćepović ?'			Stadium: JNA Stadium

22 March 1992 24	Crvena zvezda	0–0 (4–2 p)	Partizan	Belgrade
				Stadium: Marakana; Attendance: 70,000; Referee: Salem Prolić

29 March 1992 25	Partizan	6–1	Željezničar	Belgrade
	Petrić 7'; Vujačić 13'; Krčmarević 29', ?'; Vorkapić 66', ?'		Stanić ?'	Stadium: JNA Stadium

5 April 1992 26	Vardar	2–2 (4–3 p)	Partizan	Skopje
	Babunski 31'; Gunev 67'		Petrić 11'; Mijatović 55'

12 April 1992 27	Partizan	3–0	Pelister	Belgrade
				Stadium: JNA Stadium

19 April 1992 28	Proleter Zrenjanin	1–1	Partizan	Zrenjanin

29 April 1992 29	Budućnost	0–0	Partizan	Titograd

3 May 1992 30	Partizan	4–1	OFK Beograd	Belgrade
	Krčmarević 5', 75'; Mijatović 87'; Jokanović 90+1'		Špoljarić 60'	Stadium: JNA Stadium; Attendance: 10,000

9 May 1992 31	Zemun	1–1	Partizan	Belgrade

17 May 1992 32	Partizan	2–1	Rad	Belgrade
				Stadium: JNA Stadium

33	Partizan	3–0 (Note: Match was not played, because of war.)	Sloboda Tuzla	Belgrade
				Stadium: JNA Stadium

=== Yugoslav Cup ===
14 August 1991 Round of 32	Igman Ilidža	0–3	Partizan	Sarajevo
			Krčmarević; Vujačić

29 August 1991 Round of 16 1st leg	Partizan	4–1	Vardar	Belgrade
	Krčmarević 6', 73'; Vorkapić 56'; Zahovič 68'		Ćirić 35'	Stadium: JNA Stadium

25 September 1991 Round of 16 2nd leg	Vardar	0–3 (1–7 agg.)	Partizan	Skopje
			Novak 25'; Bogdanović 59'; Šćepović 88'	Attendance: 4,000

20 November 1991 Quarter finals 1st leg	Partizan	4–0	Vojvodina	Belgrade
	Bogdanović 22', 73'; Mijatović 24'; Vujačić 51'			Stadium: JNA Stadium

4 December 1991 Quarter finals 2nd leg	Vojvodina	2–1 (2–5 agg.)	Partizan	Novi Sad
	?		Vorkapić

18 March 1992 Semi finals 1st leg	Partizan	2–0	Željezničar	Belgrade
	Milanič 5'; Brnović 10'			Stadium: JNA Stadium

6 May 1992 Semi finals 2nd leg	Željezničar	0–3^{1} (0–5 agg.)	Partizan	Sarajevo

14 May 1992 Final 1st leg	Crvena zvezda	0–1	Partizan	Belgrade
			Vujačić 36'	Stadium: Marakana; Attendance: 33,024; Referee: Sava Avramović

21 May 1992 Final 2nd leg	Partizan	2–2 (3–2 agg.)	Crvena zvezda	Belgrade
	Mijatović 65'; Jokanović 76'		Mihajlović 37'; Pančev 71'	Stadium: JNA Stadium; Attendance: 39,370; Referee: Zoran Petrović

1 Return leg was scheduled to be played on 6 May 1992, but due to Bosnian War and Željezničar club leaving the competition, it was not, hence Partizan were awarded the 3-0 win.

=== UEFA Cup ===
==== First round ====
18 September 1991 First round 1st leg	Sporting Gijón (Spain)	2–0	(Socialist Federal Republic of Yugoslavia) Partizan	Gijón, Spain
	Monchu 64'; Luhový 79'	Report		Stadium: El Molinón; Attendance: 23,600

2 October 1991 First round 2nd leg	Partizan (Socialist Federal Republic of Yugoslavia)	2–0 (2 – 2 agg.) (2–3 p)	(Spain) Sporting Gijón	Istanbul, Turkey*
	Mijatović 85'; Zahovič 88'	Report		Stadium: BJK İnönü Stadium; Attendance: 1,189

== See also ==
- List of FK Partizan seasons
