= Zlatko Zahovič =

Slovenian footballer (born 1971)

Personal information
- Date of birth: 1 February 1971 (age 55)
- Place of birth: Maribor, SR Slovenia, Yugoslavia
- Height: 1.80 m (5 ft 11 in)
- Position: Attacking midfielder

Youth career
- 1979–1981: Maribor
- 1981–1989: Kovinar Maribor

Senior career*
Years	Team	Apps	(Gls)
1989–1993	Partizan	37	(5)
1989–1990	→ Mladost Petrinja (loan)		
1990–1991	→ Proleter Zrenjanin (loan)	25	(0)
1993–1996	Vitória Guimarães	79	(13)
1996–1999	Porto	87	(27)
1999–2000	Olympiacos	14	(7)
2000–2001	Valencia	20	(3)
2001–2005	Benfica	80	(14)
2008–2009	Limbuš-Pekre	11	(12)
Total		353	(81)

International career
- Yugoslavia U21
1992–2004	Slovenia	80	(35)
2003	Slovenia B	2	(1)
- * Club domestic league appearances and goals

Zlatko Zahovič (Slovene pronunciation: [ˈzlaːtkɔ ˈzaːxɔʋitʃ]; born 1 February 1971) is a Slovenian former professional footballer who played as an attacking midfielder.

After making a name for himself in Portugal, most notably with Porto and Benfica where he amassed Primeira Liga totals of 246 matches and 54 goals over one full decade, he went on to have brief stints in Spain and Greece. He was known for dribbling and goal-scoring ability alike. Although primarily a midfielder, he scored 11 goals in 32 Champions League appearances and 35 in 80 for the Slovenian national team.

The all-time record holder in goals for Slovenia, Zahovič was an essential member of the squad as they qualified for the first time ever to a European Championship and a World Cup, in the early 2000s.

== Club career ==
=== Partizan ===
Zahovič was born in Maribor, SFR Yugoslavia. In 1989, at the age of 18, he was noticed by Partizan's Milko Ǵurovski, at the time doing his mandatory military service in the town, who recommended the youngster to the club.

With the Belgrade team, he was relatively used over the course of three seasons, and also played on loan for Mladost Petrinja and Proleter Zrenjanin. For Partizan, he made 15 appearances and scored three goals during the 1992–93 league season as they won the national championship.

=== Portugal ===
In the summer of 1993, aged 22, Zahovič moved to Portugal and joined Vitória de Guimarães. On matchday 32 of the 1995–96 campaign, he scored the winning goal in a 3–2 away win over FC Porto. This performance convinced the former to sign him that summer, after an acrimonious transfer saga; he led his side to two UEFA Cup qualifications during his three-year spell.

Zahovič was equally important while at Porto, forming a formidable attacking partnership with Capucho, Ljubinko Drulović and Mário Jardel and winning three consecutive league titles whilst rarely missing a match. In his last year he netted a career-best goals, and 22 across all competitions. He added seven during the 1998–99 UEFA Champions League, thus finishing third in the competition's scoring charts behind FC Dynamo Kyiv's Andriy Shevchenko and Dwight Yorke of Manchester United, who both scored eight – the northerners, however, did not make it past the group stage.

=== Olympiacos ===
In 1999, Zahovič signed for Olympiacos F.C. for a transfer fee of €13.5 million, at the time the highest sum ever paid for a Slovenian footballer. However, his season in Greece was marred by fines and suspension. Zahovič first fell out with the club's head coach, Dušan Bajević, for returning late from a holiday.

"He was a great player. In Portugal, he achieved something that is almost impossible, being loved by both the fans of Benfica and Porto."

— José Mourinho in 2014.

In November 1999, as Olympiacos failed to progress out of the UEFA Champions League group stage, head coach Bajević was sacked and replaced with Alberto Bigon. Zahovič's relationship with the incoming head coach was similarly fraught, as the player questioned the coach's tactics.

Years later, Zahovič claimed in interviews that the real reason for his contentious season at Olympiacos was the club's continual refusal to properly set up his legal and administrative status in Greece as a professional athlete. He further accused the club of using the administrative matters as leverage when trying to avoid honouring his contract terms pertaining to income tax on his salary.

=== Valencia ===
After only one season, Zahovič moved to Spain's Valencia CF for a fee of £5.5 million. His new team reached the final of the 2000–01 Champions League, lost after a penalty shootout against FC Bayern Munich where he had his attempt saved by Oliver Kahn.

Again Zahovič clashed with his manager, Héctor Cúper, claiming he was not being given enough opportunities. Additionally, in October 2000, he was not picked up for a game at his former club for fear of reprisals from its supporters.

=== Benfica ===
In June 2001, Zahovič returned to Portugal and joined S.L. Benfica, as Carlos Marchena moved to Valencia. He was an important first-team member in his first three seasons, but lost his importance when manager Giovanni Trapattoni arrived at the Estádio da Luz, a situation which was aggravated in January 2005 with the purchase of Nuno Assis. This in part resulted in a mutual termination of his contract, five months before it was due to expire.

== International career ==
Zahovič's first match for Slovenia was on 7 November 1992, a friendly match with Cyprus. The national team qualified for UEFA Euro 2000 in Belgium and the Netherlands, with Zahovič scoring nine goals in 15 games. In the finals he continued to excel, netting three of the side's four goals in an eventual group stage exit where his performances earned him comparisons to David Beckham.

Slovenia also managed to qualify for the 2002 FIFA World Cup in South Korea and Japan, another first. However, after being replaced by manager Srečko Katanec in the 63rd minute of the first group fixture against Spain (1–3 loss), Zahovič insulted the coach, who immediately sent him home following the match.

Zahovič retired from the national team in December 2003, but reversed his decision two months later. He made his last appearance for the national team on 28 April 2004 against Switzerland, totaling 80 caps and 35 goals (at the time both records), which made him the most successful Slovenian footballer since the country's independence in 1991 and the inception of its football association into FIFA the following year; his international appearances total was surpassed by Boštjan Cesar on 15 November 2014.

== Administrative career ==
Immediately after his retirement from professional football, in June 2005 at the age of 34, according to an interview with Pozareport.si, Zahovič was offered a head coach position of the Benfica juniors, but opted for a return to his homeland where, in 2007, he became the director of football at NK Maribor. He remained in that position until March 2020. Under his guidance, the club won eight Slovenian PrvaLiga titles, reached the UEFA Champions League group stages twice (2014–15 and 2017–18), and the knockout phase of the UEFA Europa League once (2013–14).

== Personal life ==
Zahovič's son, Luka, is also a footballer. A striker, he too represented Slovenia at international level. When Luka scored a late equaliser in a Champions League group stage match between Maribor and Sporting CP, on 17 September 2014, the two became only the second father and son pair – first among Europeans – to have both scored in the competition since 1992 when the competition was established under its current name.

In his young years, Zahovič played chess and practised ski jumping.

== Career statistics ==
=== Club ===
Appearances and goals by club, season and competition
Club	Season	League			National cup		Continental		Other		Total	
Club	Season	Division	Apps	Goals	Apps	Goals	Apps	Goals	Apps	Goals	Apps	Goals
Partizan	1989–90	Yugoslav First League	0	0			—		0	0		
Mladost Petrinja (loan)	1989–90	Yugoslav Inter-Republic League					—		—			
Proleter Zrenjanin (loan)	1990–91	Yugoslav First League	25	0			—		—		25	0
Partizan	1991–92	Yugoslav First League	22	2	4	1	1	0	—		27	3
Partizan	1992–93	First League of FR Yugoslavia	15	3	4	1	—		—		19	4
Partizan	Total		37	5	8	2	1	0	—		46	7
Vitória Guimarães	1993–94	Primeira Divisão	27	1	2	1	—		—		29	2
Vitória Guimarães	1994–95	Primeira Divisão	23	4	1	0	—		—		24	4
Vitória Guimarães	1995–96	Primeira Divisão	29	8	2	0	2	0	—		33	8
Vitória Guimarães	Total		79	13	5	1	2	0	—		86	14
Porto	1996–97	Primeira Divisão	27	7	4	1	7	1	1	0	39	9
Porto	1997–98	Primeira Divisão	29	6	5	5	5	0	1	0	40	11
Porto	1998–99	Primeira Divisão	31	14	0	0	6	7	2	1	39	22
Porto	Total		87	27	9	6	18	8	4	1	118	42
Olympiacos	1999–2000	Alpha Ethniki	14	7	4	0	6	2	—		24	9
Valencia	2000–01	La Liga	20	3	1	2	10	1	—		31	6
Benfica	2001–02	Primeira Liga	21	6	2	1	—		—		23	7
Benfica	2002–03	Primeira Liga	28	6	1	0	—		—		29	6
Benfica	2003–04	Primeira Liga	21	2	2	0	8	1	—		31	3
Benfica	2004–05	Primeira Liga	10	0	1	0	6	4	1	0	18	4
Benfica	Total		80	14	6	1	14	5	1	0	101	20
Limbuš-Pekre	2008–09	1. MNZ Maribor	8	6	—		—		—		8	6
Limbuš-Pekre	2009–10	1. MNZ Maribor	3	6	—		—		—		3	6
Limbuš-Pekre	Total		11	12	—		—		—		11	12
Career total			353	81	33	12	51	16	5	1	442	110

=== International ===
Appearances and goals by national team and year
National team	Year	Apps	Goals
Slovenia	1992	1	0
Slovenia	1993	1	0
Slovenia	1994	5	1
Slovenia	1995	6	3
Slovenia	1996	6	1
Slovenia	1997	3	1
Slovenia	1998	9	6
Slovenia	1999	11	8
Slovenia	2000	10	6
Slovenia	2001	8	4
Slovenia	2002	8	2
Slovenia	2003	9	2
Slovenia	2004	3	1
Total		80	35

Scores and results list Slovenia's goal tally first, score column indicates score after each Zahovič goal.

List of international goals scored by Zlatko Zahovič
No.	Date	Venue	Opponent	Score	Result	Competition
1	16 November 1994	Ljudski vrt, Maribor, Slovenia	Lithuania	1–0	1–2	UEFA Euro 1996 qualifying
2	29 March 1995	Ljudski vrt, Maribor, Slovenia	Estonia	1–0	3–0	UEFA Euro 1996 qualifying
3	11 June 1995	Kadriorg Stadium, Tallinn, Estonia	Estonia	3–1	3–1	UEFA Euro 1996 qualifying
4	11 October 1995	Bežigrad Stadium, Ljubljana, Slovenia	Ukraine	2–2	3–2	UEFA Euro 1996 qualifying
5	10 November 1996	Bežigrad Stadium, Ljubljana, Slovenia	Bosnia and Herzegovina	1–2	1–2	1998 FIFA World Cup qualification
6	11 October 1997	Bežigrad Stadium, Ljubljana, Slovenia	Croatia	1–3	1–3	1998 FIFA World Cup qualification
7	5 February 1998	Tsirio Stadium, Limassol, Cyprus	Iceland	1–0	3–2	Cyprus International Football Tournament
8	5 February 1998	Tsirio Stadium, Limassol, Cyprus	Iceland	2–1	3–2	Cyprus International Football Tournament
9	6 February 1998	Tsirio Stadium, Limassol, Cyprus	Slovakia	1–0	1–1	Cyprus International Football Tournament
10	6 September 1998	Olympic Stadium, Athens, Greece	Greece	1–0	2–2	UEFA Euro 2000 qualifying
11	6 September 1998	Olympic Stadium, Athens, Greece	Greece	2–2	2–2	UEFA Euro 2000 qualifying
12	10 October 1998	Bežigrad Stadium, Ljubljana, Slovenia	Norway	1–0	1–2	UEFA Euro 2000 qualifying
13	8 February 1999	Sultan Qaboos Sports Complex, Muscat, Oman	Oman	5–0	7–0	Oman International Tournament
14	28 April 1999	Ljubljana Sports Park, Ljubljana, Slovenia	Finland	1–1	1–1	Friendly
15	5 June 1999	Daugava Stadium, Riga, Latvia	Latvia	1–1	2–1	UEFA Euro 2000 qualifying
16	5 June 1999	Daugava Stadium, Riga, Latvia	Latvia	2–1	2–1	UEFA Euro 2000 qualifying
17	9 June 1999	Qemal Stafa Stadium, Tirana, Albania	Albania	1–0	1–0	UEFA Euro 2000 qualifying
18	18 August 1999	Bežigrad Stadium, Ljubljana, Slovenia	Albania	1–0	2–0	UEFA Euro 2000 qualifying
19	4 September 1999	Bežigrad Stadium, Ljubljana, Slovenia	Georgia	2–1	2–1	UEFA Euro 2000 qualifying
20	13 November 1999	Bežigrad Stadium, Ljubljana, Slovenia	Ukraine	1–1	2–1	UEFA Euro 2000 qualifying
21	23 February 2000	Sultan Qaboos Sports Complex, Muscat, Oman	Oman	2–0	4–0	Oman International Tournament
22	3 June 2000	Bežigrad Stadium, Ljubljana, Slovenia	Saudi Arabia	1–0	2–0	Friendly
23	13 June 2000	Stade du Pays de Charleroi, Charleroi, Belgium	FR Yugoslavia	1–0	3–3	UEFA Euro 2000
24	13 June 2000	Stade du Pays de Charleroi, Charleroi, Belgium	FR Yugoslavia	3–0	3–3	UEFA Euro 2000
25	18 June 2000	Amsterdam Arena, Amsterdam, Netherlands	Spain	1–1	1–2	UEFA Euro 2000
26	7 October 2000	Stade Josy Barthel, Luxembourg City, Luxembourg	Luxembourg	1–0	2–1	2002 FIFA World Cup qualification
27	28 March 2001	Bežigrad Stadium, Ljubljana, Slovenia	FR Yugoslavia	1–1	1–1	2002 FIFA World Cup qualification
28	2 June 2001	Bežigrad Stadium, Ljubljana, Slovenia	Luxembourg	2–0	2–0	2002 FIFA World Cup qualification
29	2 June 2001	Bežigrad Stadium, Ljubljana, Slovenia	Luxembourg	2–0	2–0	2002 FIFA World Cup qualification
30	15 August 2001	Bežigrad Stadium, Ljubljana, Slovenia	Romania	2–2	2–2	Friendly
31	12 February 2002	Hong Kong Stadium, Hong Kong	Honduras	1–1	1–5	2002 Lunar New Year Cup
32	17 May 2002	Bežigrad Stadium, Ljubljana, Slovenia	Ghana	1–0	2–0	Friendly
33	2 April 2003	Bežigrad Stadium, Ljubljana, Slovenia	Cyprus	3–1	4–1	UEFA Euro 2004 qualifying
34	30 April 2003	Ta' Qali National Stadium, Attard, Malta	Malta	1–0	3–1	UEFA Euro 2004 qualifying
35	28 April 2004	Stade de Genève, Lancy, Switzerland	Switzerland	1–0	1–2	Friendly

== Honours ==
Partizan

- First League of FR Yugoslavia: 1992–93
- Yugoslav Cup: 1991–92

Porto

- Primeira Divisão: 1996–97, 1997–98, 1998–99
- Taça de Portugal: 1997–98
- Supertaça Cândido de Oliveira: 1996, 1998, 1999

Olympiacos

- Alpha Ethniki: 1999–2000

Valencia

- UEFA Champions League runner-up: 2000–01

Benfica

- Primeira Liga: 2004–05
- Taça de Portugal: 2003–04
- Supertaça Cândido de Oliveira runner-up: 2004

Limbuš-Pekre

- 1. MNZ Maribor: 2009–10
