= Pandurović =

Pandurović is a Serbian and Croatian surname. People with the name include:

- Goran Pandurović (born 1963), Serbian former footballer
- Sima Pandurović (1883–1960), Serbian poet
