= Bratislav Mijalković =

Serbian footballer

Personal information
- Full name: Bratislav Mijalković
- Date of birth: 10 September 1971 (age 55)
- Place of birth: Pirot, SFR Yugoslavia
- Height: 1.79 m (5 ft 10 in)
- Position: Defender

Youth career
- Radnički Pirot

Senior career*
Years	Team	Apps	(Gls)
1988–1990	Radnički Pirot		
1990–1996	Partizan	103	(1)
1996	Rennes	0	(0)
1997–1998	Perugia	15	(0)
2000–2001	Spartak Varna	9	(0)
- Radnički Pirot
- Hajduk Veljko
- Vlasina
2005–2007	Radnički Pirot		
Total		118	(1)

International career
1991	Yugoslavia U21	3	(0)
- * Club domestic league appearances and goals

Bratislav Mijalković (Serbian Cyrillic: Братислав Мијалковић; born 10 September 1971) is a Serbian former footballer who played as a defender.

== Club career ==
After starting out at his hometown club Radnički Pirot, Mijalković was transferred to Partizan in 1990. He spent six seasons with the Crno-beli, winning three national championships (1993, 1994, and 1996) and two national cups (1992 and 1994).

In May 1996, Mijalković moved abroad to France and signed a contract with Rennes. He, however, failed to make an impact and was soon released by the French club. In February 1997, Mijalković joined Italian side Perugia. He spent one and a half seasons in Italy. In March 2000, Mijalković was signed by Bulgarian club Spartak Varna.

== International career ==
At international level, Mijalković made three appearances for the Yugoslavia under-21s in 1991.

== Honours ==
Partizan

- First League of FR Yugoslavia: 1992–93, 1993–94, 1995–96
- FR Yugoslavia Cup: 1991–92, 1993–94
