= 1997 Ballon d'Or =

Annual association football award event in France

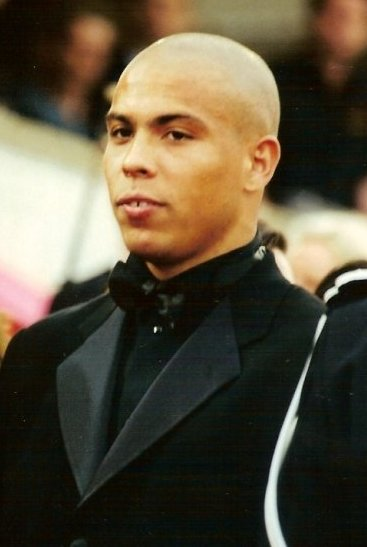
- 1997 Ballon d'Or winner, Ronaldo
- Date: 23 December 1997
- Presented by: France Football

Highlights
- Won by: (Brazil) Ronaldo (1st award)
- Website: ballondor.com

The 1997 Ballon d'Or, given to the best football player in Europe as judged by a panel of sports journalists from UEFA member countries, was awarded to Ronaldo on 23 December 1997. The Brazilian became the youngest winner of the award, at 21 years old. On 19 November 1997, the shortlist of 50 male players compiled by a group of experts from France Football was announced.

== Rankings ==
Rank	Player	Club(s)	Nationality	Points
1	Ronaldo	(Spain) Barcelona (Italy) Internazionale	Brazil	222
2	Predrag Mijatović	(Spain) Real Madrid	FR Yugoslavia	68
3	Zinedine Zidane	(Italy) Juventus	France	63
4	Dennis Bergkamp	(England) Arsenal	Netherlands	57
5	Roberto Carlos	(Spain) Real Madrid	Brazil	47
6	Andreas Möller	(Germany) Borussia Dortmund	Germany	40
7	Raúl	(Spain) Real Madrid	Spain	35
8	Peter Schmeichel	(England) Manchester United	Denmark	19
9	Jürgen Kohler	(Germany) Borussia Dortmund	Germany	17
10	Matthias Sammer	(Germany) Borussia Dortmund	Germany	16
10	Christian Vieri	(Spain) Atlético Madrid	Italy	16
12	Youri Djorkaeff	(Italy) Internazionale	France	15
13	Luis Enrique	(Spain) Barcelona	Spain	14
14	Luís Figo	(Spain) Barcelona	Portugal	12
15	Gianfranco Zola	(England) Chelsea	Italy	11
15	Krasimir Balakov	(Germany) VfB Stuttgart	Bulgaria	11
17	Didier Deschamps	(Italy) Juventus	France	10
17	Clarence Seedorf	(Spain) Real Madrid	Netherlands	10
19	Alessandro Del Piero	(Italy) Juventus	Italy	9
19	Alan Shearer	(England) Newcastle United	England	9
19	David Beckham	(England) Manchester United	England	9
22	Fernando Hierro	(Spain) Real Madrid	Spain	8
23	Gabriel Batistuta	(Italy) Fiorentina	Argentina	7
24	Olaf Thon	(Germany) Schalke 04	Germany	6
25	Juninho	(Spain) Atlético Madrid	Brazil	5
25	Paulo Sousa	(Germany) Borussia Dortmund	Portugal	5
25	Lilian Thuram	(Italy) Parma	France	5
28	Ryan Giggs	(England) Manchester United	Wales	4
29	Oliver Bierhoff	(Italy) Udinese	Germany	3
29	Angelo Peruzzi	(Italy) Juventus	Italy	3
29	Raí	(France) Paris Saint-Germain	Brazil	3
32	Victor Ikpeba	(France) Monaco	Nigeria	2
33	Laurent Blanc	(France) Marseille	France	1
33	Ciro Ferrara	(Italy) Juventus	Italy	1
33	Rivaldo	(Spain) Barcelona	Brazil	1
33	Bent Skammelsrud	(Norway) Rosenborg	Norway	1

Additionally, fourteen players were nominated but received no votes: Sonny Anderson (Monaco/Barcelona & Brazil), Enrico Chiesa (Parma & Italy), Hernán Crespo (Parma & Argentina), Iván de la Peña (Barcelona & Spain), Robbie Fowler (Liverpool & England), Thomas Häßler (Karlsruher SC & Germany), Thomas Helmer (Bayern Munich & Germany), Filippo Inzaghi (Atalanta/Juventus & Italy), Gianluca Pagliuca (Inter Milan & Italy), Robert Pires (Metz & France), Karl-Heinz Riedle (Borussia Dortmund/Liverpool & Germany), Sergi (Barcelona & Spain), Davor Šuker (Real Madrid & Croatia) and Ian Wright (Arsenal & England).
