= Zoran Mirković =

Serbian footballer and manager

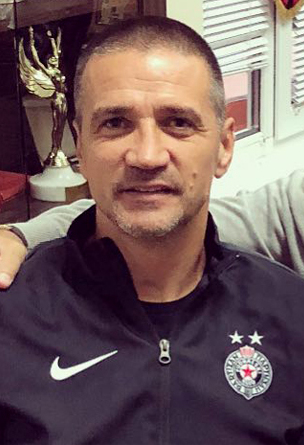
- Mirković in 2018

Personal information
- Date of birth: 21 September 1971 (age 55)
- Place of birth: Belgrade, SFR Yugoslavia
- Height: 1.82 m (5 ft 11 1/2 in)
- Position: Defender

Team information
- Current team: Serbia U21 (manager)

Youth career
- 1986–1990: Rad

Senior career*
Years	Team	Apps	(Gls)
1990	Radnički Svilajnac (army)	15	(0)
1990–1993	Rad	62	(1)
1993–1996	Partizan	82	(1)
1996–1998	Atalanta	52	(0)
1998–2000	Juventus	27	(0)
2000–2003	Fenerbahçe	71	(3)
2004–2006	Partizan	46	(2)
Total		355	(7)

International career
1995–2003	Serbia and Montenegro	59	(0)

Managerial career
- 2015: Sinđelić Beograd (assistant)
- 2015: Sinđelić Beograd
- 2016–2018: Montenegro (assistant)
- 2018–2019: Partizan
- 2025–: Serbia U21
- 2025: Serbia (caretaker)
- * Club domestic league appearances and goals

Zoran "Bata" Mirković (Serbian Cyrillic: Зоран Бата Мирковић, pronounced [zǒran bâ:ta mǐrkoʋitɕ]; born 21 September 1971) is a Serbian former footballer who played as a defender and current manager of the Serbia national under-21 football team.

== Playing career ==
=== Club career ===
Mirković made his first appearance for FK Rad during the 1990–91 season. But even before that he and his teammates won the Yugoslav title in the under-21 category, the biggest success Rad ever had. Mirković spent three seasons in Rad as a professional player, and all together played 62 matches, scoring one goal. His talent didn't go unnoticed by Partizan officials and they invited him to sign for Partizan. Mirković signed for Partizan and replaced the injured Blažo Pešikan.

In the first three years Mirković was with Partizan, he established himself as a player, became a first-choice player in the national team and won three titles (the double in 1993–94 followed by the league title in 1994–95. He wore the number 2 shirt and became a favourite of the Partizan fans because of his fighting spirit especially in derby matches against Red Star Belgrade. He was also a favourite because, in those difficult times (war and sanctions), he upheld his obligations towards Partizan and stayed for all three years stipulated in his contract. He played 82 matches for Partizan (26 in the 1993–94 season, 29 in the 1994–95 season and 27 in the 1995–96 season), scoring one goal.

Mirković spent two seasons with Atalanta. He got injured in the first match in Serie A league and had to take a three-month break. He played a role of midfielder/defender and his performance was so good that the then Juventus coach Marcello Lippi invited him to sign for Juventus. He was very popular among the Atalanta fans who were instrumental in convincing the club not to sell him to Fiorentina when that option seemed inevitable.

Mirković's career in Juventus can be divided in two different periods. Under coach Lippi, Bata played 19 Serie A matches, scoring one goal. He also played UEFA Champions League matches. When Carlo Ancelotti took over in the spring of 1999, Mirković was no longer a first-choice Juve player, playing mostly Italian Cup matches.

In summer 2000, Mirković signed a three-year contract with Fenerbahçe. In his first season in Istanbul he won a Turkish League title and was a finalist in Turkish Cup. In his second season in Turkey he played Champions League and came second in Turkish League. His third season in Fenerbahçe was not so successful. Three coaches and problems in the club caused Fenerbahçe to end the season in the sixth place.

Then in January 2004, following a 6-month break from football, Mirković became a Partizan player once again, signing a contract for two and a half years. On 6 March 2006, Mirković announced his retirement due to a recurring back injury at the age of 34.

=== International career ===
Mirković was a first choice player for the national team of FR Yugoslavia/Serbia and Montenegro where he usually played in the right-back position and wore the number 2 shirt. He played 59 matches with the senior national team. He was a participant in the 1998 FIFA World Cup in France but missed Euro 2000 because of a three-match ban following an incident in the last qualifying match, played against Croatia in Zagreb, where he grabbed Robert Jarni by the testicles and therefore was sent off. His final international was a June 2003 European Championship qualification match away against Azerbaijan.

== Post-playing career ==
=== Administrative career ===
On 24 April 2007, Football Association of Serbia (FSS) appointed Mirković as sporting director of the national team, responsible for the A-squad and the under-21 squad. However, he quit by early December 2007, citing poor professional cooperation with the FSS leadership headed at the time by Zvezdan Terzić. FSS president Terzić (who would soon afterwards be indicted on embezzlement charges) commented on Mirković's resignation as follows: "Mirković is my mistake since I didn't know him well enough as a person before I brought him into the FSS. He's a wonderful person, but couldn't manage to be a part of the system and even said so on several occasions to both myself and general secretary Zoran Laković".

Mirković was chosen as the vice-president of FK Partizan on 18 August 2008. He was vice-president for about a year when he resigned after Partizan's early exit in the 2009–10 UEFA Champions League qualifying rounds.

=== Managerial career ===
Mirković began his managerial career as assistant coach of Sinđelić Beograd in 2015 eventually being promoted to head coach in July 2015. He remained in that position until December 2015. In February 2016, he became the assistant coach of the Montenegrin national team where he worked directly with his former coach Ljubiša Tumbaković. He remained in that position until 4 August 2018 when he replaced Miroslav Đukić as head coach of Partizan. He was head coach of Partizan until abruptly resigning after a 1–0 loss to Voždovac on 10 March 2019.

In July 2025, Mirković was appointed as head coach of Serbia U21 national team. In October that year, he became interim coach of the Serbia senior team following Dragan Stojković's resignation ahead of their World Cup qualifier against Andorra.

== Personal life ==
In May 2013, Mirković married Sanela Šaulić, daughter of singer Šaban Šaulić, making Mirković the stepfather of Luka Adžić.

== Career statistics ==
=== Club ===
Club	Season	League		Cup		Continental		Total	
Club	Season	Apps	Goals	Apps	Goals	Apps	Goals	Apps	Goals
Rad	1990–91	5	0			—		5	0
Rad	1991–92	26	0			—		26	0
Rad	1992–93	31	1			—		31	1
Rad	Total	62	1			—		62	1
Partizan	1993–94	26	0			—		26	0
Partizan	1994–95	29	0			—		29	0
Partizan	1995–96	27	1			—		27	1
Partizan	Total	82	1			—		82	1
Atalanta	1996–97	22	0			—		22	0
Atalanta	1997–98	30	0			—		33	0
Atalanta	Total	52	0			—		52	0
Juventus	1998–99	19	0	5	0	4	0	28	0
Juventus	1999–00	8	0	4	0	10	0	22	0
Juventus	Total	27	0	9	0	14	0	50	0
Fenerbahçe	2000–01	29	1	5	0	0	0	34	1
Fenerbahçe	2001–02	27	2	1	0	5	0	33	2
Fenerbahçe	2002–03	15	0	0	0	4	0	19	0
Fenerbahçe	Total	71	3	6	0	9	0	86	3
Partizan	2003–04	10	0	1	0	0	0	11	0
Partizan	2004–05	23	2	3	0	12	0	38	2
Partizan	2005–06	13	0	0	0	6	0	19	0
Partizan	Total	46	2	4	0	18	0	68	2
Career total		340	7	19	0	41	0	400	7

=== International ===
National team	Year	Apps	Goals
FR Yugoslavia / Serbia and Montenegro	1995	6	0
FR Yugoslavia / Serbia and Montenegro	1996	5	0
FR Yugoslavia / Serbia and Montenegro	1997	13	0
FR Yugoslavia / Serbia and Montenegro	1998	8	0
FR Yugoslavia / Serbia and Montenegro	1999	6	0
FR Yugoslavia / Serbia and Montenegro	2000	3	0
FR Yugoslavia / Serbia and Montenegro	2001	5	0
FR Yugoslavia / Serbia and Montenegro	2002	8	0
FR Yugoslavia / Serbia and Montenegro	2003	5	0
Total		59	0

=== Managerial ===
As of 10 March 2019

Managerial record by team and tenure
Team	From	To	Record				
Team	From	To	P	W	D	L	Win %
Sinđelić Beograd	July 2015	December 2015	16	6	5	5	37.50
Partizan	4 August 2018	10 March 2019	30	17	10	3	56.67
Total			46	23	15	8	50.00

== Honours ==
Partizan

- First League of FR Yugoslavia: 1993–94, 1995–96, 2004–05
- FR Yugoslavia Cup: 1993–94

Juventus

- UEFA Intertoto Cup: 1999

Fenerbahçe

- Süper Lig: 2000–01

== Notes ==
1. Known as FR Yugoslavia until 4 February 2003.
