= Goran Pandurović =

Serbian footballer

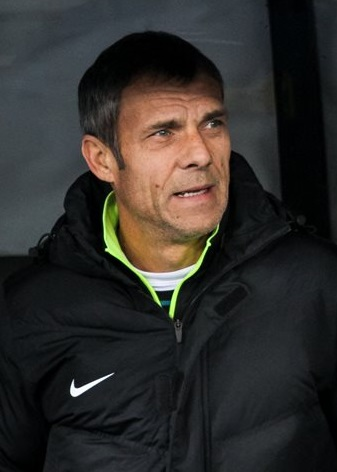
- Pandurović with Partizan in 2017

Personal information
- Full name: Goran Pandurović
- Date of birth: 16 July 1963 (age 63)
- Place of birth: Titovo Užice, SFR Yugoslavia
- Height: 1.84 m (6 ft 0 in)
- Position: Goalkeeper

Senior career*
Years	Team	Apps	(Gls)
1985–1989	Sloboda Užice	102	(0)
1989–1995	Partizan	115	(1)
1995–1998	Rennes	59	(0)
Total		276	(1)

International career
1994–1995	FR Yugoslavia	4	(0)

Managerial career
- 2004–2005: Rad (assistant)
- 2007–2012: Partizan (goalkeeping coach)
- 2010–2012: Serbia (goalkeeping coach)
- 2012–2013: Beijing Guoan (assistant)
- 2014: Maccabi Haifa (assistant)
- 2015–2016: Beijing BG (assistant)
- 2017–2018: Partizan (assistant)
- 2019–2020: Sporting Gijón (assistant)
- * Club domestic league appearances and goals

Goran Pandurović (Serbian Cyrillic: Горан Пандуровић; born 16 July 1963) is a Serbian former footballer who played as a goalkeeper.

== Club career ==
While playing for Sloboda Užice in the 1980s, Pandurović made over 100 appearances in the Yugoslav Second League. He was later transferred to Partizan in the summer of 1989. Over the next three seasons, Pandurović served as a backup to Fahrudin Omerović, as the side won the 1991–92 Yugoslav Cup. He became the club's first-choice goalkeeper in the following 1992–93 season, helping Partizan win the league title. Following Gordan Petrić's departure in late 1993, Pandurović was named as the team's captain, celebrating the double at the end of the season. He made a total of 115 league appearances in six seasons with Partizan, even scoring once. In the summer of 1995, Pandurović moved abroad and signed with French side Rennes. He spent three seasons at the club, before retiring from the game in 1998.

== International career ==
At international level, Pandurović was capped four times for FR Yugoslavia between 1994 and 1995, making his debut in a friendly against Brazil.

== Post-playing career ==
After hanging up his boots, Pandurović joined Rad as an assistant to Radmilo Ivančević in June 2004. He subsequently served as a long-term goalkeeping coach for his former club Partizan. Later on, Pandurović worked as assistant manager to Aleksandar Stanojević at Maccabi Haifa and Beijing BG, as well as to Miroslav Đukić at Partizan and Sporting Gijón.

== Honours ==
Partizan

- First League of FR Yugoslavia: 1992–93, 1993–94
- FR Yugoslavia Cup: 1991–92, 1993–94
