= Gordan Petrić =

Serbian footballer (born 1969)

Personal information
- Full name: Gordan Petrić
- Date of birth: 30 July 1969 (age 57)
- Place of birth: Belgrade, SR Serbia, SFR Yugoslavia
- Height: 1.85 m (6 ft 1 in)
- Position: Defender

Team information
- Current team: Serbia U19 (manager)

Youth career
- OFK Beograd

Senior career*
Years	Team	Apps	(Gls)
1986–1988	OFK Beograd	65	(12)
1989–1993	Partizan	106	(6)
1993–1995	Dundee United	60	(3)
1995–1998	Rangers	65	(3)
1998–1999	Crystal Palace	18	(1)
1999	AEK Athens	7	(0)
1999–2001	Heart of Midlothian	37	(0)
2001–2002	Partizan	0	(0)
2002	→ Sichuan Dahe (loan)	3	(0)
Total		361	(25)

International career
1987	Yugoslavia U20	4	(0)
1988–1990	Yugoslavia U21	6	(1)
1989–1997	FR Yugoslavia (Note: Including 2 caps for SFR Yugoslavia.)	5	(0)

Managerial career
- 2013: Bežanija
- 2015: Sinđelić Beograd
- 2015: Zemun
- 2016: Čukarički
- 2017: Rad
- 2019: Larissa
- 2020: Gorica
- 2022–2023: Partizan
- 2024: Čukarički
- 2024–2025: Serbia U18
- 2025–: Serbia U19
Medal record
Gold medal – first place	FIFA World Youth Championship	1987
Silver medal – second place	UEFA Under-21 Championship	1990
- * Club domestic league appearances and goals

Gordan Petrić (Serbian Cyrillic: Гордан Петрић; born 30 July 1969) is a Serbian football manager and former player.

== Club career ==
Petrić made his senior debut with OFK Beograd in the 1985–86 season, as the club suffered relegation from the top flight of Yugoslav football. He was transferred to Partizan in the 1989 winter transfer widow. In the following five years, Petrić won one league title and two national cups, before transferring to Scottish club Dundee United in November 1993. He immediately became a first-team regular under manager Ivan Golac, winning the Scottish Cup in his debut season with the club. His consistent performances at Tannadice earned him a move to Rangers in July 1995. Petrić remained with the club for three years, helping them secure their ninth league title in a row, before a spell in England with Crystal Palace. He scored once for the club in a 1–1 draw against Sheffield United.

On 2 July 1999, Petrić moved to Greece and signed for AEK Athens. On 2 December depite being a few months at the club, he returned to Scotland at the request of Jim Jefferies and was transferred to Hearts for a fee of 250 million drachmas. Petrić remained with Hearts until March 2001, leaving the club two years before the end of his contract by mutual consent. He scored once for Hearts in a 3–2 UEFA Cup win over VfB Stuttgart.

After six months of training with his former club Partizan, Petrić was loaned to Chinese club Sichuan Dahe in March 2002. He briefly stayed there, before retiring from the game.

== International career ==
Petrić represented the Yugoslavia U20 national team at the 1987 FIFA World Youth Championship, as the team won the tournament. He was later called up to the Yugoslavia senior national team's UEFA Euro 1992 squad. However, the country was eventually banned from the tournament due to the Yugoslav Wars.

Petrić collected a total of five caps for the senior national team of his country between 1989 and 1997.

== Post-playing career ==
Between 2007 and 2008, Petrić served as general secretary of Partizan. He was subsequently named vice-president of the club in October 2008, alongside Zoran Mirković. They both left their positions by September 2009.

In December 2012, Petrić was appointed manager of Bežanija. He left the club in late 2013. Subsequently, together with Ivan Tomić, Petrić was named as assistant to Serbia caretaker Ljubinko Drulović in May 2014.

After two brief stints at Sinđelić Beograd and Zemun, both in 2015, Petrić became manager of Serbian SuperLiga club Čukarički in September 2016. His contract was terminated by mutual consent after three months.

In June 2017, Petrić was appointed manager of Rad.

In September 2020, Petrić was named the new head coach of Slovenian top division side Gorica, replacing Borivoje Lučić. He resigned only three months later, when Gorica was in last place after 17 rounds.

On 12 August 2022, Petrić returned to Partizan, being appointed as the new manager of the club. On 24 February 2023, Petrić resigned.

== Career statistics ==
=== Club ===
Appearances and goals by club, season and competition
Club	Season	League		National cup		League cup		Continental		Total	
Club	Season	Apps	Goals	Apps	Goals	Apps	Goals	Apps	Goals	Apps	Goals
OFK Beograd	1985–86	1	0			—		—		1	0
OFK Beograd	1986–87	16	2			—		—		16	2
OFK Beograd	1987–88	30	6			—		—		30	6
OFK Beograd	1988–89	18	4			—		—		18	4
OFK Beograd	Total	65	12			—		—		65	12
Partizan	1988–89	15	0	2	0	—		0	0	17	0
Partizan	1989–90	27	3	6	0	—		5	0	38	3
Partizan	1990–91	16	0	2	0	—		4	0	22	0
Partizan	1991–92	5	1	2	0	—		0	0	7	1
Partizan	1992–93	33	1	9	0	—		—		42	1
Partizan	1993–94	10	1	4	0	—		—		14	1
Partizan	Total	106	6	25	0	—		9	0	140	6
Dundee United	1993–94	27	1	8	0	0	0	0	0	35	1
Dundee United	1994–95	33	2	4	0	3	0	2	1	42	3
Dundee United	Total	60	3	12	0	3	0	2	1	77	4
Rangers	1995–96	33	1	4	0	3	0	6	0	46	1
Rangers	1996–97	26	2	1	0	5	0	6	1	38	3
Rangers	1997–98	6	0	3	0	1	0	1	0	11	0
Rangers	1998–99	0	0	0	0	0	0	2	0	2	0
Rangers	Total	65	3	8	0	9	0	15	1	97	4
Crystal Palace	1998–99	18	1	0	0	0	0	—		18	1
AEK Athens	1999–2000	7	0	4	1	—		5	0	16	1
Heart of Midlothian	1999–2000	18	0	2	0	1	0	—		21	0
Heart of Midlothian	2000–01	19	0	2	0	1	0	2	1	24	1
Heart of Midlothian	Total	37	0	4	0	2	0	2	1	45	1
Sichuan Dahe (loan)	2002	3	0			—		—		3	0
Career total		361	25	53	1	14	0	33	3	461	29

=== International ===
Appearances and goals by national team and year
National team	Year	Apps	Goals
SFR Yugoslavia	1989	2	0
SFR Yugoslavia	1990	0	0
SFR Yugoslavia	1991	0	0
SFR Yugoslavia	1992	0	0
FR Yugoslavia	1993	—	
FR Yugoslavia	1994	0	0
FR Yugoslavia	1995	0	0
FR Yugoslavia	1996	0	0
FR Yugoslavia	1997	3	0
Total		5	0

== Manager Statistics ==
As of 10 July 2026

Managerial record by team and tenure
Team	From	To	Record							
Team	From	To	G	W	D	L	GF	GA	GD	Win %
Bežanija	1 January 2013	30 June 2013	17	6	8	3	23	14	+9	35.29
Sinđelić Beograd	1 January 2015	30 June 2015	15	9	1	5	22	12	+10	60.00
Zemun	1 July 2015	12 October 2015	9	3	4	2	11	10	+1	33.33
Čukarički	22 September 2016	17 December 2016	13	5	3	5	17	19	−2	38.46
Rad	1 July 2017	16 October 2017	14	3	2	9	19	30	−11	21.43
Larissa	1 July 2019	8 August 2019	0	0	0	0	0	0	+0	—
Gorica	18 September 2020	7 December 2020	17	2	4	11	9	25	−16	11.76
Partizan	12 August 2022	28 February 2023	30	18	7	5	62	34	+28	60.00
Čukarički	5 January 2024	13 March 2024	7	3	2	2	11	10	+1	42.86
Serbia U18	13 September 2024	30 June 2025	8	1	1	6	9	17	−8	12.50
Serbia U19	1 July 2025		17	9	1	7	32	29	+3	52.94
Total			147	59	33	55	215	200	+15	40.14

== Honours ==
Partizan

- First League of FR Yugoslavia: 1992–93
- Yugoslav Cup: 1988–89, 1991–92

Dundee United

- Scottish Cup: 1993–94

Rangers

- Scottish Premier Division: 1995–96, 1996–97
- Scottish Cup: 1995–96
- Scottish League Cup: 1996–97

Yugoslavia

- FIFA World Youth Championship: 1987
- UEFA Under-21 Championship: runner-up 1990
