= Predrag Mijatović =

Yugoslavian footballer (born 1969)

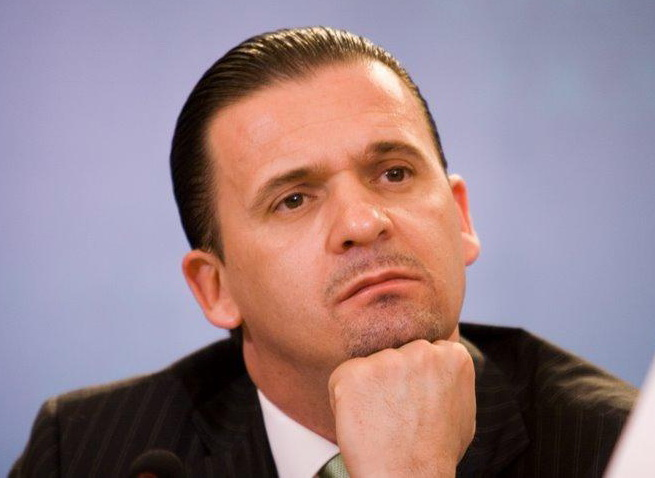
- Mijatović in 2007

Personal information
- Date of birth: 19 January 1969 (age 57)
- Place of birth: Podgorica, SR Montenegro, SFR Yugoslavia
- Height: 1.78 m (5 ft 10 in)
- Position: Striker

Youth career
- Kom
- OFK Titograd
- Budućnost Titograd

Senior career*
Years	Team	Apps	(Gls)
1987–1989	Budućnost Titograd	73	(10)
1990–1993	Partizan	104	(44)
1993–1996	Valencia	104	(56)
1996–1999	Real Madrid	90	(29)
1999–2002	Fiorentina	42	(4)
2002–2003	Levante	21	(3)
Total		434	(146)

International career
1989–2003	Serbia and Montenegro (Note: Including 9 caps for SFR Yugoslavia. Serbia and Montenegro was known as FR Yugoslavia until 2003.)	73	(27)
Medal record
Men's football
Representing Yugoslavia
FIFA U-20 World Cup
Winner	1987
UEFA European Under-21 Championship
Runner-up	1990
- * Club domestic league appearances and goals

Predrag Mijatović (Serbian Cyrillic: Предраг Мијатовић; born 19 January 1969) is a Montenegrin football administrator and former player who played as a striker.

At club level, Mijatović played for six clubs: Budućnost, Partizan, Valencia, Real Madrid, Fiorentina and Levante. He scored 28 goals in the 1995–96 La Liga season for Valencia, which prompted a move to Real Madrid, where he scored a goal in the 1998 UEFA Champions League final which ensured Madrid's first European Cup in 32 years. In 1997, Mijatović was named runner-up for the Ballon d'Or, behind Ronaldo and ahead of Zinedine Zidane.

Internationally, Mijatović played for FR Yugoslavia at the 1998 FIFA World Cup and at the UEFA Euro 2000.

After his playing career, Mijatović served as director of football for Real Madrid from 2006 to 2009. He also served as vice-president of Partizan from 2024 to 2026.

== Club career ==
=== Budućnost ===
From the 1987–88 season, Mijatović became a regular at Budućnost under new head coach Stanko Poklepović. In October 1987, he was a member of the Yugoslav youth squad which competed in and won the 1987 FIFA World Youth Championship in Chile. Upon his return to Budućnost, Mijatović's spot on the squad was now cemented alongside Dejan Savićević, Dragoljub Brnović and Branko Brnović, who also represented Yugoslavia in Chile. Mijatović made 31 league appearances and contributed four goals as Budućnost finished the season in ninth position.

During the winter of 1989–90, Mijatović nearly signed with Hajduk Split after negotiating with Hajduk's sporting director Jurica Jerković, with even a DM50,000 pre-contract payment given to the player. However, Partizan club president Mirko Marjanović stepped in and convinced Mijatović to join the Belgrade-based club instead. In December 1989, Partizan ultimately paid a DM1 million transfer fee to Budućnost for Mijatović. This was at time the highest transfer within the Yugoslav league.

In later interviews, Mijatović said a deteriorating political and security situation in Yugoslavia was a factor in his decision not to join the Croatian club Hajduk.

=== Partizan ===
Though he scored on his Partizan debut against his former club Budućnost, Mijatović's debut half season in the new club under head coach Ivan Golac was mostly spent settling into the new surroundings. He failed to score in his following 14 league appearances until the end of the 1989–90 league season.

However, Mijatović continued improving, becoming the squad's undisputed leader during 1991–92 season under head coach Ivica Osim, and leading Partizan to the 1992 Yugoslav Cup title over reigning European Cup champions Red Star Belgrade. He was also named Yugoslav Footballer of the Year award en route.

At Partizan, Mijatović had been linked with various top European sides, which included Juventus. He joined Valencia in the summer of 1993.

=== Valencia ===
Mijatović made his Valencia debut on 5 September 1993 against Real Oviedo. He won the Spanish Footballer of the Year award in the 1995–96 season, having scored 28 goals in 40 La Liga matches. As the second best goal-scorer in the league, he was the runner-up for the Pichichi Trophy, second only to Juan Antonio Pizzi. Mijatović's contributions helped Valencia finish in second place behind Atlético Madrid that season.

=== Real Madrid ===
On 13 February 1996, Mijatović signed an advanced contract with Real Madrid mandating that he join the club from Valencia in the summer of 1996. The deal was confirmed a month later when the club met his buyout clause with a transfer fee of Pts. 1.486 billion. Former Yugoslavia teammate Davor Šuker, as well as Clarence Seedorf and Roberto Carlos, also joined Real Madrid in the summer 1996 transfer window. Coach Fabio Capello often deployed Mijatović in a strike tandem with Šuker, reviving their partnership from their time in Yugoslavia's youth team at the 1987 FIFA World Youth Championship. Over the course of the 1996–97 La Liga season, Mijatović scored a total of 14 goals; he scored one goal in Real Madrid's 2–0 victory over Barcelona the El Clásico on 7 December 1996, escaping from Miguel Ángel Nadal and Laurent Blanc before lifting the ball over Vítor Baía to score. By the end of the season, Real Madrid were first in La Liga and also claimed the 1997 Supercopa de España over Barcelona.

On 20 May 1998, Mijatović scored the winning goal in Real Madrid's 1–0 victory over Juventus in the 1998 UEFA Champions League final. This was Real Madrid's first UEFA Champions League title after 32 years. The following season was Mijatović's final season with Los Blancos; at the end of the season, the 30-year-old Mijatović was sold to Italian Serie A club Fiorentina.

=== Fiorentina ===
On 28 June 1999, Mijatović signed a three-year contract with Fiorentina for 17 billion Italian lire. His earliest performances at Fiorentina were promising; despite Fiorentina's attacking depth with the likes of Gabriel Batistuta, coach Giovanni Trapattoni initially chose Mijatović as a starter. On 26 July 1999, Mijatović scored the opening goal in Fiorentina's 4–0 victory over Aston Villa in the Gotham Cup finals in New York City, a pre-season exhibition tournament. He played at Fiorentina for two seasons, scoring four goals within the Serie A, and added a Coppa Italia title to his honours. Additionally, he featured in Fiorentina's 1999–2000 UEFA Champions League campaign, which resulted in a third-place finish in Group B of the second group stage behind Manchester United and former club Valencia.

=== Levante ===
Mijatović joined Levante UD in the summer of 2002. He played there for one season, after which Levante finished in fourth place in the Segunda División 2002–03 season. He subsequently retired from professional football after struggling with lingering injuries.

== International career ==
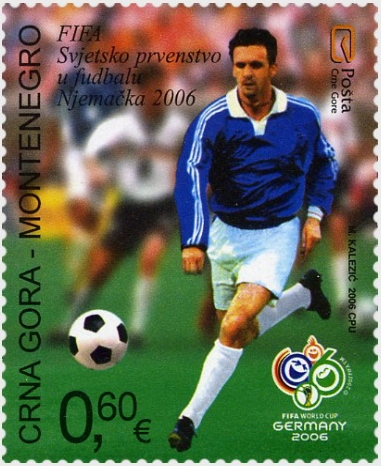
Mijatović (in an FR Yugoslavia kit) on a 2006 stamp of Montenegro

Mijatović was included in Yugoslavia's squad for the 1987 FIFA World Youth Championship, winning the tournament.

Mijatović made his senior debut for Yugoslavia national football team in an August 1989 friendly match against Finland. He was also called by the main team to UEFA Euro 1992, but the nation would be suspended due to the Yugoslav Wars.

=== 1998 FIFA World Cup ===
Mijatović was the top scorer for the FR Yugoslavia national football team during the 1998 FIFA World Cup qualification. Seven of his 14 goals came in the play-off tie against Hungary, as Yugoslavia won 12–1 on aggregate to qualify for the final tournament.

Mijatović was one of the key players for FR Yugoslavia in the 1998 FIFA World Cup, appearing in all four of his team's games and scoring a goal in a 2–2 draw against Germany in the group stage. He however missed a penalty in the match versus the Netherlands in the round of 16, eventually losing 2–1.

=== UEFA Euro 2000 ===
Mijatović played for FR Yugoslavia at UEFA Euro 2000, appearing in all games as the team exited in the quarter-finals following a 6–1 loss to the Netherlands.

Mijatović has earned a total of 73 international caps, scoring 27 goals. His final international game was a June 2003 European Championship qualification match against Azerbaijan.

== Post-playing career ==
After retiring in 2004, Mijatović continued living in the city of Valencia and soon became a player agent.

In 2006, Mijatović became Real Madrid's director of football, serving in the position for three seasons under the leadership of Ramón Calderón as club president. During this time, Mijatovic signed important players in Real Madrid's history such as Fabio Cannavaro, Ruud van Nistelrooy, Marcelo, Gonzalo Higuaín and Pepe.

Through his friendship with Anzhi Makhachkala general manager German Chistyakov, Mijatović was reportedly part of the three-man delegation (the other two were Anzhi's transfer man German Tkachenko and Serbian player agent Vlado Lemić) the Russian club deployed to Milan on 9 August 2011 for initial negotiations with Internazionale (represented by sporting director Marco Branca and vice-president Rinaldo Ghelfi) over the transfer of striker Samuel Eto'o.

In October 2024, Mijatović was appointed vice president of FK Partizan under president Rasim Ljajić. After a promising start to his tenure, he quickly became unpopular among the fans during the 2025–26 season because of the team's bad results and controversial statements. By the end of the season, the dissagrements escalated into full out feud with other members of the board, who publicly criticized Mijatović. He resigend on 1 June 2026, after a sesion of the club's assembly that voted in favour of his confidence, but without expanding his powers as sporting director.

== Personal life ==
Born in Titograd (now Podgorica), Mijatović grew up in the Masline neighbourhood. He is married to Aneta Milićević.

On 3 June 2009, the official website of Real Madrid stated that Mijatović's son Andrej, aged 15, died after a long illness, and offered its "deepest sympathies on behalf of the entire club and its members".

== Career statistics ==
=== Club ===
Appearances and goals by club, season and competition
Club	Season	League			Cup		Continental		Other		Total	
Club	Season	Division	Apps	Goals	Apps	Goals	Apps	Goals	Apps	Goals	Apps	Goals
Budućnost Titograd	1986–87	Yugoslav First League	1	0			—		—		1	0
Budućnost Titograd	1987–88	Yugoslav First League	31	4			—		—		31	4
Budućnost Titograd	1988–89	Yugoslav First League	28	2			—		—		28	2
Budućnost Titograd	1989–90	Yugoslav First League	13	4			—		—		13	4
Budućnost Titograd	Total		73	10			—		—		73	10
Partizan	1989–90	Yugoslav First League	15	1	2	0	2	0	—		19	1
Partizan	1990–91	Yugoslav First League	33	14	3	1	6	1	—		42	16
Partizan	1991–92	Yugoslav First League	25	12	6	2	2	0	—		33	14
Partizan	1992–93	Yugoslav First League	31	17	8	2	—		—		39	19
Partizan	Total		104	44	19	5	10	1	—		133	50
Valencia	1993–94	La Liga	35	16	2	1	4	2	—		41	19
Valencia	1994–95	La Liga	29	12	9	3	—		—		38	15
Valencia	1995–96	La Liga	40	28	9	6	—		—		49	34
Valencia	Total		104	56	20	10	4	2	—		128	68
Real Madrid	1996–97	La Liga	38	14	5	1	—		—		43	15
Real Madrid	1997–98	La Liga	24	10	0	0	8	1	2 (Note: Appearances in Supercopa de España)	1	34	12
Real Madrid	1998–99	La Liga	28	5	4	2	7	2	2 (Note: One appearance in Intercontinental Cup, one appearance in UEFA Super Cup)	0	41	9
Real Madrid	Total		90	29	9	3	15	3	4	1	118	36
Fiorentina	1999–2000	Serie A	16	2	0	0	9	1	—		25	3
Fiorentina	2000–01	Serie A	13	1	4	2	2	2	—		19	5
Fiorentina	2001–02	Serie A	13	1	0	0	4	0	—		17	1
Fiorentina	Total		42	4	4	2	15	3	—		61	9
Levante	2002–03	Segunda División	21	3	0	0	—		—		21	3
Career total			434	146	52	20	44	9	4	1	534	176

=== International ===
Appearances and goals by national team and year
National team	Year	Apps	Goals
SFR Yugoslavia	1989	3	0
SFR Yugoslavia	1990	0	0
SFR Yugoslavia	1991	5	0
SFR Yugoslavia	1992	1	0
FR Yugoslavia	1993	— (Note: FR Yugoslavia was banned from international football due to UN sanctions.)	
FR Yugoslavia	1994	2	0
FR Yugoslavia	1995	1	0
FR Yugoslavia	1996	6	3
FR Yugoslavia	1997	8	11
FR Yugoslavia	1998	11	3
FR Yugoslavia	1999	7	2
FR Yugoslavia	2000	12	4
FR Yugoslavia	2001	6	2
FR Yugoslavia	2002	6	1
Serbia and Montenegro	2003	5	1
Total		73	27

Scores and results list Yugoslavia's and Serbia and Montenegro's goal tally first, score column indicates score after each Mijatović goal.

List of international goals scored by Predrag Mijatović
No.	Date	Venue	Opponent	Score	Result	Competition
1	2 June 1996	Red Star Stadium, Belgrade, FR Yugoslavia	Malta	2–0	6–0	1998 FIFA World Cup qualification
2	6 October 1996	Svangaskarð, Toftir, Faroes	Faroe Islands	3–1	8–1	1998 FIFA World Cup qualification
3	10 November 1996	Red Star Stadium, Belgrade, FR Yugoslavia	Czech Republic	1–0	1–0	1998 FIFA World Cup qualification
4	2 April 1997	Stadion Letná, Prague, Czech Republic	Czech Republic	1–0	2–1	1998 FIFA World Cup qualification
5	30 April 1997	Red Star Stadium, Belgrade, FR Yugoslavia	Spain	1–1	1–1	1998 FIFA World Cup qualification
6	8 June 1997	Red Star Stadium, Belgrade, FR Yugoslavia	Slovakia	2–0	2–0	1998 FIFA World Cup qualification
7	11 October 1997	National Stadium, Ta' Qali, Malta	Malta	4–0	5–0	1998 FIFA World Cup qualification
8	29 October 1997	Üllői úti stadion, Budapest, Hungary	Hungary	4–0	7–1	1998 FIFA World Cup qualification
9	29 October 1997	Üllői úti stadion, Budapest, Hungary	Hungary	6–0	7–1	1998 FIFA World Cup qualification
10	29 October 1997	Üllői úti stadion, Budapest, Hungary	Hungary	6–0	7–1	1998 FIFA World Cup qualification
11	15 November 1997	Red Star Stadium, Belgrade, FR Yugoslavia	Hungary	2–0	5–0	1998 FIFA World Cup qualification
12	15 November 1997	Red Star Stadium, Belgrade, FR Yugoslavia	Hungary	3–0	5–0	1998 FIFA World Cup qualification
13	15 November 1997	Red Star Stadium, Belgrade, FR Yugoslavia	Hungary	4–0	5–0	1998 FIFA World Cup qualification
14	15 November 1997	Red Star Stadium, Belgrade, FR Yugoslavia	Hungary	5–0	5–0	1998 FIFA World Cup qualification
15	29 May 1998	Red Star Stadium, Belgrade, FR Yugoslavia	Nigeria	2–0	3–0	Friendly
16	21 June 1998	Stade Bollaert-Delelis, Lens, France	Germany	1–0	2–2	1998 FIFA World Cup
17	18 November 1998	Red Star Stadium, Belgrade, FR Yugoslavia	Republic of Ireland	1–0	1–0	UEFA Euro 2000 qualification
18	8 June 1999	Toumba Stadium, Thessaloniki, Greece	Malta	1–1	4–1	UEFA Euro 2000 qualification
19	9 October 1999	Stadion Maksimir, Zagreb, Croatia	Croatia	1–1	2–2	UEFA Euro 2000 qualification
20	23 February 2000	City Stadium, Skopje, Macedonia	Macedonia	1–0	2–1	Friendly
21	23 February 2000	City Stadium, Skopje, Macedonia	Macedonia	2–0	2–1	Friendly
22	28 March 2000	Partizan Stadium, Belgrade, FR Yugoslavia	China	1–0	1–0	Friendly
23	16 August 2000	Windsor Park, Belfast, Northern Ireland	Northern Ireland	2–1	2–1	Friendly
24	2 June 2001	Luzhniki Stadium, Moscow, Russia	Russia	1–1	1–1	2002 FIFA World Cup qualification
25	6 October 2001	Partizan Stadium, Belgrade, FR Yugoslavia	Luxembourg	2–2	6–2	2002 FIFA World Cup qualification
26	12 October 2002	Stadio San Paolo, Naples, Italy	Italy	1–0	1–1	UEFA Euro 2004 qualification
27	12 February 2003	City Stadium, Podgorica	Azerbaijan	1–0	2–2	UEFA Euro 2004 qualification

== Honours ==
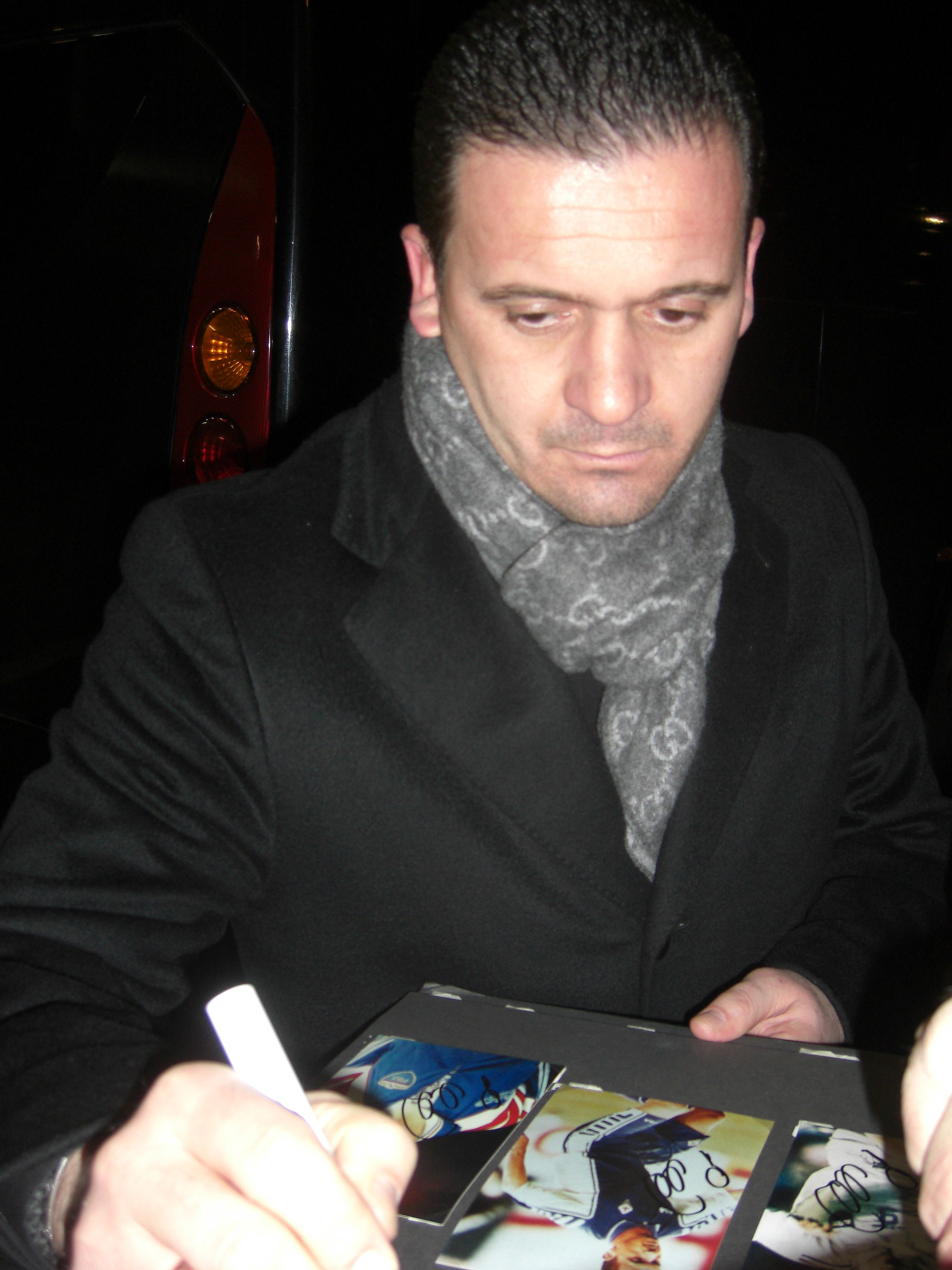
Mijatović signing autographs in 2007

Partizan

- Yugoslav First League: 1992–93
- Yugoslav Cup: 1991–92

Real Madrid

- La Liga: 1996–97
- Supercopa de España: 1997
- UEFA Champions League: 1997–98
- Intercontinental Cup: 1998

Fiorentina

- Coppa Italia: 2000–01

Yugoslavia

- FIFA U-20 World Cup: 1987
- UEFA European Under-21 Championship runner-up: 1990

=== Individual ===
Awards

- FR Yugoslavia Player of the Year: 1992, 1993, 1998
- La Liga Best Foreign Player: 1995–96
- Ballon d'Or: Runner-up 1997
- ADN Eastern European Footballer of the Season: 1997
