= Ljubomir Vorkapić =

Serbian footballer

Personal information
- Full name: Ljubomir Vorkapić
- Date of birth: 19 February 1967 (age 59)
- Place of birth: Osijek, SR Croatia, SFR Yugoslavia
- Height: 1.81 m (5 ft 11 in)
- Position: Forward

Youth career
- Šparta Beli Manastir

Senior career*
Years	Team	Apps	(Gls)
1987–1991	Vojvodina	114	(27)
1991–1993	Partizan	60	(20)
1994	Hércules	17	(6)
1994–1995	Vitória Guimarães	18	(2)
1996	Almería	9	(2)
1997	Ovarense	1	(0)
1998	Slavia Sofia	11	(7)
1998	Veria	10	(1)
1999	Vojvodina	3	(0)
1999	Slavia Sofia	6	(1)
Total		249	(66)
- * Club domestic league appearances and goals

Ljubomir Vorkapić (Serbian Cyrillic: Љубомир Воркапић; born 19 February 1967) is a Serbian former professional footballer who played as a forward.

== Career ==
After starting out at Šparta Beli Manastir, Vorkapić joined Vojvodina in the 1986–87 season, as the club won the Yugoslav Second League and took promotion to the Yugoslav First League. He subsequently helped the team win the national championship in the 1988–89 season.

In the summer of 1991, Vorkapić was transferred to Partizan, winning the final edition of the Yugoslav Cup in his debut season. He was also a member of the team that won the First League of FR Yugoslavia in the inaugural 1992–93 season.

After moving abroad in early 1994, Vorkapić went on to play in Spain (Hércules and Almería), Portugal (Vitória Guimarães and Ovarense), Bulgaria (Slavia Sofia), and Greece (Veria).

== Career statistics ==
Club	Season	League	
Club	Season	Apps	Goals
Vojvodina	1986–87	3	0
Vojvodina	1987–88	27	0
Vojvodina	1988–89	25	6
Vojvodina	1989–90	30	8
Vojvodina	1990–91	29	13
Vojvodina	Total	114	27
Partizan	1991–92	22	5
Partizan	1992–93	31	15
Partizan	1993–94	8	0
Partizan	Total	61	20
Hércules	1993–94	17	6
Vitória Guimarães	1994–95	14	2
Vitória Guimarães	1995–96	4	0
Vitória Guimarães	Total	18	2
Almería	1995–96	9	2
Ovarense	1997–98	1	0
Slavia Sofia	1997–98	11	7
Veria	1998–99	10	1
Vojvodina	1998–99	3	0
Slavia Sofia	1999–2000	6	1
Career total		250	66

== Honours ==
Vojvodina

- Yugoslav First League: 1988–89
- Yugoslav Second League: 1986–87

Partizan

- First League of FR Yugoslavia: 1992–93
- Yugoslav Cup: 1991–92
