= Džoni Novak =

Slovenian footballer

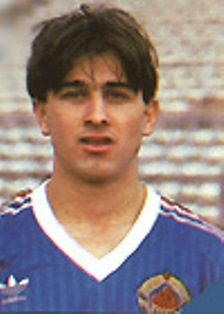
- Novak with Yugoslavia national team.

Personal information
- Date of birth: 4 September 1969 (age 57)
- Place of birth: Ljubljana, SFR Yugoslavia
- Height: 1.72 m (5 ft 8 in)
- Position: Midfielder

Youth career
- Črnuče

Senior career*
Years	Team	Apps	(Gls)
1988–1990	Olimpija	58	(4)
1991–1992	Partizan	32	(4)
1992–1993	Fenerbahçe	29	(4)
1994–1996	Olimpija	63	(10)
1996–1999	Le Havre	68	(0)
1999–2000	Sedan	11	(0)
2000–2002	SpVgg Unterhaching	38	(1)
2003	Olympiacos	5	(0)
Total		304	(23)

International career
- Yugoslavia U21
1991–1992	Yugoslavia	4	(0)
1992–2002	Slovenia	71	(3)
Medal record
Representing Yugoslavia
Silver medal – second place	UEFA U-21 Euro	1990
- * Club domestic league appearances and goals

Džoni Novak (born 4 September 1969) is a Slovenian former professional footballer who played as a midfielder. He represented his country at Euro 2000 and the 2002 World Cup.

== Club career ==
Born in Ljubljana, he started his professional career playing at Olimpija in 1988. He played for two seasons before signing for Serbian club Partizan. He played in Belgrade for a season and a half, appearing in 20 matches and scoring nine league goals for the club before leaving it for Fenerbahçe. After only a season in Turkey, he returned to Olimpija. Playing for Olimpija, Novak appeared in 63 league matches and scored ten goals. He also won the Slovenian championship twice with the club, in 1994 and 1995, and the Slovenian Cup in 1996. Later he moved to French club Le Havre. He played there for the next three seasons, appearing in 68 matches before leaving to join another French team, CS Sedan. He spent only one season with Sedan and left the club, making 11 appearances. He moved on to Germany and signed with SpVgg Unterhaching. He stayed there two seasons, making 37 appearances and scoring one goal. After that he played for six months for Greek side Olympiacos before retiring.

== International career ==
During his spell at Partizan, he earned four caps for Yugoslavia. Even after the independence of Slovenia, Novak was included by Yugoslavia in their squad for Euro 1992, along with Darko Milanič. However, the nation would be suspended due to the Yugoslav Wars. He was also capped 71 times and scored three goals for Slovenia. He was a participant at Euro 2000 and the 2002 World Cup. His final international game was at the latter tournament against Paraguay.

=== International goals ===
Scores and results list Slovenia's goal tally first.

#	Date	Venue	Opponent	Score	Result	Competition
1	11 June 1995	Kadrioru Stadium, Tallinn	Estonia	2–1	3–1	UEFA Euro 1996 qualification
2	11 June 1995	Kadrioru Stadium, Tallinn	Estonia	3–1	3–1	UEFA Euro 1996 qualification
3	17 May 2002	Bežigrad Stadium, Ljubljana	Ghana	2–0	2–0	Friendly match

== Honours ==
Partizan

- Yugoslav Cup: 1991–92

Olimpija

- Slovenian Championship: 1993–94, 1994–95
- Slovenian Cup: 1995–96

Olympiacos

- Alpha Ethniki: 2002–03
