= 1992–93 First League of FR Yugoslavia =

First League of FR Yugoslavia
- Season: 1992–93
- Champions: Partizan; 12th domestic title
- Champions League: No team
- UEFA Cup: No team
- Top goalscorer: Anto Drobnjak; Vesko Mihajlović (22)

The 1992–93 First League of FR Yugoslavia was the first football season in the Federal Republic of Yugoslavia which was composed of the republics of Serbia and Montenegro, following the breakup of the SFR Yugoslavia. FK Partizan were the champions.

FK Borac Banja Luka from Banja Luka, Bosnia and Herzegovina, also participated, although they played their home matches within the territory of Serbia.

== Teams ==
Location of teams in the 1992–93 First League

Club	City	Stadium	Capacity
Partizan	Belgrade	Partizan Stadium	32,710
Red Star	Belgrade	Red Star Stadium	55,538
Vojvodina	Novi Sad	Karađorđe Stadium	17,204
Zemun	Zemun, Belgrade	Zemun Stadium	10,000
Rad	Belgrade	Stadion Kralj Petar I	6,000
Napredak Kruševac	Kruševac	Mladost Stadium	10,000
Radnički Niš	Niš	Čair Stadium	18,000
Hajduk Kula	Kula	Stadion Hajduk	6,000
Proleter	Zrenjanin	Stadion Karađorđev park	13,500
Budućnost Podgorica	Podgorica	Podgorica City Stadium	12,000
OFK Beograd	Karaburma, Belgrade	Omladinski Stadium	20,000
Bečej	Bečej	Stadion kraj Tise	3,000
Mogren	Budva	Stadion Lugovi	4,000
OFK Kikinda	Kikinda	Kikinda City Stadium	6,000
Radnički Beograd	Novi Beograd	Stadion FK Radnički	5,000
Sutjeska	Nikšić	Gradski stadion (Nikšić)	10,800
Spartak	Subotica	Subotica City Stadium	13,000
Priština	Priština	Priština City Stadium	25,000
Borac (Note: Between 1992 and 1995, Borac Banja Luka participated in the national competitions organized by the Football Association of FR Yugoslavia. They played their home games in Valjevo due to the Bosnian War.)	Banja Luka	Banja Luka City Stadium	12,000

== League table ==
Pos	Team	Pld	W	D	L	GF	GA	GD	Pts	Qualification or relegation
1	Partizan (C)	36	31	3	2	103	20	+83	65	Placed in the Autumn IA league
2	Red Star	36	19	13	4	70	25	+45	51	Placed in the Autumn IA league
3	Vojvodina	36	19	8	9	72	47	+25	46	Placed in the Autumn IA league
4	Zemun	36	16	8	12	62	48	+14	40	Placed in the Autumn IA league
5	Rad	36	13	13	10	47	35	+12	39	Placed in the Autumn IA league
6	Napredak Kruševac	36	13	12	11	44	58	−14	38	Placed in the Autumn IA league
7	Radnički Niš	36	15	7	14	40	36	+4	37	Placed in the Autumn IA league
8	Hajduk Kula	36	12	12	12	34	35	−1	36	Placed in the Autumn IA league
9	Proleter Zrenjanin	36	15	6	15	43	45	−2	36	Placed in the Autumn IA league
10	Budućnost Podgorica	36	14	8	14	44	48	−4	36	Placed in the Autumn IA league
11	OFK Beograd	36	9	17	10	38	54	−16	35	Placed in the Autumn IB league
12	Bečej	36	12	9	15	49	45	+4	33	Placed in the Autumn IB league
13	Mogren	36	12	7	17	46	52	−6	31	Placed in the Autumn IB league
14	Kikinda	36	11	9	16	39	58	−19	31	Placed in the Autumn IB league
15	Radnički Beograd	36	11	7	18	45	62	−17	29	Placed in the Autumn IB league
16	Sutjeska	36	11	7	18	46	67	−21	29	Placed in the Autumn IB league
17	Spartak Subotica	36	7	12	17	32	58	−26	26	Placed in the Autumn IB league
18	Priština (R)	36	7	9	20	32	64	−32	23	Relegation to Second League of FR Yugoslavia
19	Borac Banja Luka (R)	36	6	11	19	35	64	−29	23	Relegation to Second League of FR Yugoslavia

Rules for classification: 1) points; 2) goal difference; 3) number of goals scored.
(C) Champions; (R) Relegated

== Results ==
Home \ Away	BEČ	BOR	BUD	HAJ	KIK	MOG	NAP	OFK	PAR	PRI	PRO	RAD	RNB	RNI	RSB	SPA	SUT	VOJ	ZEM
Bečej		2–1	2–0	0–0	5–1	1–0	2–2	2–0	1–4	3–0	3–0	0–0	2–1	0–1	1–1	1–1	5–0	2–0	1–1
Borac Banja Luka	3–2		0–0	1–0	5–1	3–2	0–0	1–1	0–3	2–0	1–1	1–1	1–3	0–1	0–5	3–0	4–4	0–1	1–3
Budućnost Podgorica	1–0	2–1		0–0	4–0	3–1	3–0	3–0	3–2	3–1	1–0	1–0	4–2	2–0	2–2	1–0	2–1	1–5	0–0
Hajduk Kula	2–1	2–1	2–1		0–0	2–1	0–0	3–0	0–3	1–0	2–1	1–2	1–1	2–0	1–4	2–0	3–2	1–1	2–0
Kikinda	1–2	2–0	2–1	1–0		1–0	3–0	4–4	0–2	4–1	1–0	0–0	1–0	1–1	1–1	2–0	2–0	1–2	1–5
Mogren	0–0	2–0	1–0	0–0	2–0		1–1	1–1	1–3	1–1	1–0	2–1	4–1	1–0	2–0	4–1	4–1	3–1	3–1
Napredak Kruševac	0–0	3–0	3–1	2–1	1–1	3–2		2–2	0–1	1–0	2–0	1–0	3–2	2–0	0–0	2–1	2–1	1–0	2–0
OFK Beograd	1–1	1–1	0–0	1–1	1–1	3–2	3–2		0–4	1–0	1–3	2–0	1–1	1–0	0–0	1–0	1–0	1–1	2–1
Partizan	2–1	3–1	3–0	4–1	2–0	4–0	10–1	5–1		1–0	4–1	3–0	4–0	2–0	1–0	3–0	4–0	2–0	5–1
Priština	3–2	3–0	1–1	1–0	2–1	0–0	0–0	0–0	0–2		1–0	2–2	3–0	1–0	0–1	1–2	2–3	1–1	1–1
Proleter Zrenjanin	1–0	2–0	0–0	1–1	1–0	1–0	3–0	2–1	1–2	5–1		2–1	2–1	2–2	1–3	1–0	3–0	1–0	2–1
Rad	1–0	0–0	3–0	1–1	2–0	1–1	6–1	1–0	1–0	3–0	2–1		2–1	3–0	0–0	1–0	1–2	2–2	2–2
Radnički Beograd	2–1	0–0	3–0	1–0	3–1	3–0	2–0	1–1	1–3	3–2	0–1	1–1		2–1	2–1	1–1	1–2	3–4	1–1
Radnički Niš	2–1	2–0	1–0	1–0	1–1	1–0	2–0	2–0	1–1	2–1	3–1	2–2	0–1		1–1	5–0	2–0	1–1	1–0
Red Star	4–1	3–0	3–0	0–0	0–0	3–0	2–2	5–1	1–1	3–0	2–1	2–0	4–0	2–0		3–0	2–1	3–2	3–0
Spartak Subotica	0–2	1–1	3–1	0–0	2–0	3–1	2–2	2–2	2–2	0–0	1–1	0–3	1–0	0–2	0–0		2–2	4–3	1–0
Sutjeska	2–1	2–2	3–1	0–1	1–2	3–1	1–1	0–1	0–5	5–1	1–0	2–1	1–0	2–1	2–2	0–0		1–3	0–2
Vojvodina	4–0	3–1	2–1	2–1	5–1	3–1	4–2	1–1	0–1	2–1	1–1	1–0	6–0	2–1	1–0	2–1	1–1		2–3
Zemun	3–1	3–0	1–1	1–0	2–1	2–1	2–0	1–1	1–2	8–1	5–0	1–1	2–1	1–0	1–4	3–1	1–0	2–3	

Source: EU-Football.info
Legend: Blue = home team win; Yellow = draw; Red = away team win.

== Winning squad ==
Champions: Partizan Belgrade (Coach: Ljubiša Tumbaković)

Players (league matches/league goals)

- (Federal Republic of Yugoslavia) Goran Pandurović
- (Republika Srpska) Nikola Damjanac
- (North Macedonia) Vujadin Stanojković
- (Republika Srpska) Nebojša Gudelj
- (Federal Republic of Yugoslavia) Slaviša Jokanović
- (Federal Republic of Yugoslavia) Gordan Petrić
- (Federal Republic of Yugoslavia) Budimir Vujačić
- (Federal Republic of Yugoslavia) Vuk Rašović
- (Federal Republic of Yugoslavia) Goran Bogdanović
- (Federal Republic of Yugoslavia) Petar Vasiljević
- (Federal Republic of Yugoslavia) Albert Nađ
- (Federal Republic of Yugoslavia) Bratislav Mijalković
- (Slovenia) Zlatko Zahovič
- (Federal Republic of Yugoslavia) Dragan Ćirić
- (Federal Republic of Yugoslavia) Ljubomir Vorkapić
- (Federal Republic of Yugoslavia) Branko Brnović
- (Federal Republic of Yugoslavia) Slobodan Krčmarević
- (Federal Republic of Yugoslavia) Savo Milošević
- (Federal Republic of Yugoslavia) Ivan Tomić
- (Federal Republic of Yugoslavia) Slobodan Milanović
- (Federal Republic of Yugoslavia) Dejan Rađenović
- (Federal Republic of Yugoslavia) Blažo Pešikan
- (Federal Republic of Yugoslavia) Dejan Tasić
- (Federal Republic of Yugoslavia) Predrag Mijatović

== Top goalscorers ==
Rank	Player	Club	Goals
1	(Federal Republic of Yugoslavia) Anto Drobnjak	Red Star	22
1	(Federal Republic of Yugoslavia) Vesko Mihajlović	Vojvodina	22
3	(Federal Republic of Yugoslavia) Predrag Mijatović	Partizan	17
4	(Federal Republic of Yugoslavia) Goran Stojiljković	Radnički Niš	16
5	(Federal Republic of Yugoslavia) Ljubomir Vorkapić	Partizan	15
6	(Federal Republic of Yugoslavia) Boban Kitanov	Zemun	14
6	(Federal Republic of Yugoslavia) Savo Milošević	Partizan	14
6	(Federal Republic of Yugoslavia) Nikola Milinković	Bečej	14
9	(Federal Republic of Yugoslavia) Dejan Čurović	Zemun	13
9	(Federal Republic of Yugoslavia) Ilija Ivić	Red Star	13
9	(Federal Republic of Yugoslavia) Zoran Mašić	OFK Beograd	13
9	(Federal Republic of Yugoslavia) Slaviša Jokanović	Partizan	13
