= Blažo Pešikan =

Montenegrin footballer (born 1971)

Personal information
- Full name: Blažo Pešikan
- Date of birth: 15 February 1971 (age 55)
- Place of birth: Nikšić, SFR Yugoslavia
- Height: 1.85 m (6 ft 1 in)
- Position: Midfielder

Senior career*
Years	Team	Apps	(Gls)
1988–1990	Sutjeska Nikšić	53	(3)
1991–1994	Partizan	1	(0)
- Mladost Lučani
1997–1998	Bane Raška		
1998–2000	Vrbas	28	(9)
2000–2002	Hajduk Kula	5	(0)
- OFK Beograd
- Borac Čačak
- * Club domestic league appearances and goals

Blažo Pešikan (Cyrillic: Блажо Пешикан; born 15 February 1971) is a Montenegrin former footballer who played mostly as a midfielder.

== Club career ==
Pešikan played with FK Sutjeska Nikšić before becoming part of the famous Partizan Belgrade squads of the early 1990s, most notably winning the double in 1993–94. This was the second double in Partizan's (football) history. Though a talented defensive-style player, injuries prevented him from achieving his full potential thus Zoran Mirković was signed as a replacement. In total, he logged 47 appearances for Partizan, scoring two goals. One was a domestic league match while the rest a collection of friendlies. He played with FK Vrbas in the seasons 1998–99 and 1999–00.

== Personal life ==
At the junior level, he was a national long jump champion in SR Montenegro. After his playing career, he emigrated to Toronto.

== Honours ==
Partizan

- First League of FR Yugoslavia: 1993–94
- FR Yugoslavia Cup: 1993–94
