= Slaviša Jokanović =

Serbian footballer and manager

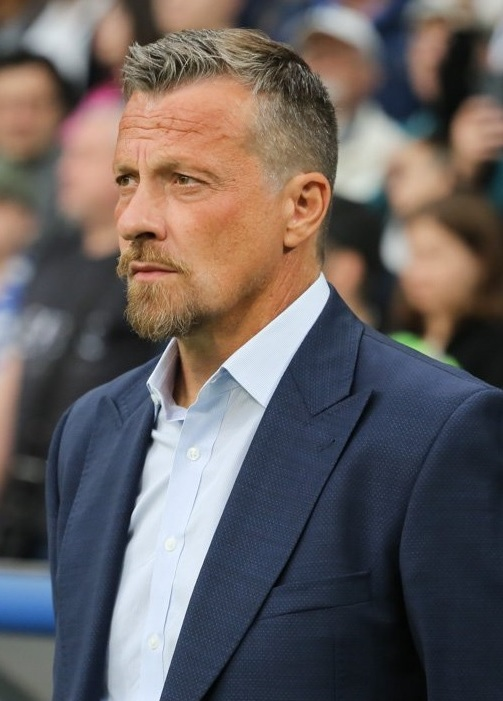
- Jokanović with Dynamo Moscow in 2022

Personal information
- Full name: Slaviša Jokanović
- Date of birth: 16 August 1968 (age 58)
- Place of birth: Novi Sad, SR Serbia, Yugoslavia
- Height: 6 ft 3 in (1.91 m)
- Position: Defensive midfielder

Team information
- Current team: Basel (head coach)

Youth career
- Novi Sad

Senior career*
| Years | Team | Apps | (Gls) |
| 1986–1988 | Novi Sad | 40 | (8) |
| 1988–1990 | Vojvodina | 54 | (10) |
| 1990–1993 | Partizan | 67 | (21) |
| 1993–1995 | Oviedo | 62 | (12) |
| 1995–1999 | Tenerife | 123 | (17) |
| 1999–2000 | Deportivo La Coruña | 23 | (2) |
| 2000–2002 | Chelsea | 39 | (0) |
| 2003–2004 | Ciudad Murcia | 6 | (0) |
| Total | | 414 | (70) |

International career
| 1991–2002 | FR Yugoslavia (Note: Including 6 caps for SFR Yugoslavia.) | 64 | (10) |

Managerial career
- 2007–2009: Partizan
- 2012–2013: Muangthong United
- 2013: Levski Sofia
- 2014: Hércules
- 2014–2015: Watford
- 2015: Maccabi Tel Aviv
- 2015–2018: Fulham
- 2019–2021: Al-Gharafa
- 2021: Sheffield United
- 2022–2023: Dynamo Moscow
- 2025–2026: Al-Nasr
- 2026–: Basel
Medal record
Representing Yugoslavia
| Silver medal – second place | UEFA U-21 Euro | 1990 |
- * Club domestic league appearances and goals

Slaviša Jokanović (Serbian Cyrillic: Славиша Јокановић, pronounced [slǎʋiʃa jokȃnoʋitɕ]; born 16 August 1968) is a Serbian professional football manager and former player who is currently head coach of Swiss Super League club Basel.

A physical player considered strong in the air, he impressed at Partizan, before spending seven seasons in La Liga at the service of three clubs, appearing in 208 matches and scoring 31 goals, mainly for Tenerife. He also played for two years with Chelsea towards the end of his career, and represented Yugoslavia at the 1998 World Cup and Euro 2000, earning 64 caps and scoring ten goals in an eleven-year international career.

Jokanović began his managerial career in 2007, winning two consecutive doubles with Partizan, the 2012 Thai Premier League with Muangthong United, and leading Watford and Fulham to promotion to the Premier League in 2015 and 2018 respectively.

== Club career ==
=== Early career ===
Born in Novi Sad, Vojvodina, SFR Yugoslavia, Jokanović started playing with his hometown club Novi Sad, and made his senior debut with neighbouring Vojvodina, helping it win its second national title in the 1988–89 season, with four goals in 24 matches.

In 1990, Jokanović joined Belgrade's Partizan. In his second year he helped the team win the domestic cup and, in his third, he scored 13 league goals (a career best), being one of several players to net in double digits – the team scored 103 in 36 matches – en route to the league conquest.

After his displays at Partizan, Jokanović signed for Oviedo in Spain. During his two-year spell, he partnered compatriots Janko Janković, Nikola Jerkan and Robert Prosinečki and, subsequently, he joined fellow La Liga club Tenerife for the 1995-96 season, being instrumental in their domestic and European consolidation.

=== Deportivo de La Coruña ===
In the summer 1999, Jokanović signed for Deportivo La Coruña at the insistence of coach Javier Irureta, who deployed him in a partnership with Brazilians Donato and Mauro Silva. The trio combined for 85 matches and five goals, as the Galicians won their first ever league title.

=== Chelsea ===
After only one season with Deportivo, Jokanović signed with Chelsea in October 2000, for £1.7 million. Under coach Claudio Ranieri, he appeared 39 times for the Blues over two consecutive Premier League seasons, and played a total of 53 matches. He was released in July 2002, at nearly 34.

He subsequently retired from professional football, after playing just three months in the Spanish second division with Ciudad Murcia.

== International career ==
Jokanović played six times for SFR Yugoslavia, making his debut on 27 February 1991 in a friendly match against Turkey, when he played the last ten minutes after replacing Željko Petrović. He appeared in some UEFA Euro 1992 qualifying matches, helping the national team to top its group and being was selected for the final tournament, but the team was suspended due to the Yugoslav Wars.

During the last official match ever that SFR Yugoslavia played on 28 May 1992 against Fiorentina in Florence, Jokanović scored the only goal for his team and subsequently became the last man to score a goal for Yugoslavia. Fiorentina made a comeback and won the game 2–1. The match was played just two days before the announcement of United Nations Security Council Resolution 757, which forbade Yugoslavia to participate at UEFA Euro 1992.

Jokanović represented FR Yugoslavia 58 times, representing the country the 1998 FIFA World Cup and Euro 2000. In the former competition, he scored his first two international goals in an 8–1 away victory against the Faroe Islands in qualification before playing four complete matches as Yugoslavia reached the round of 16. Jokanović played three times at UEFA Euro 2000, being sent-off against Spain in a 3–4 loss, with FR Yugoslavia reaching the quarter-finals.

== Coaching career ==
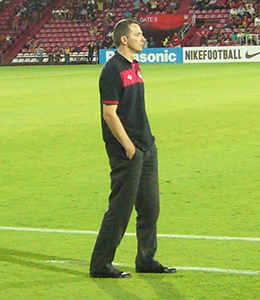
Jokanović with Muangthong United in 2013

=== Partizan ===
Jokanović was living in Madrid when, in September 2007, he joined the technical staff of Tercera División club Pinto. However, three months later, he became the head coach of Partizan, replacing Miroslav Đukić, who left to take the reins of the national team. His family (wife and three children) remained in the Spanish capital.

In May 2008, under Jokanović's management, Partizan won the double (league and cup). He was also selected as the year's "Best Coach in Serbia" by the Football Association of Serbia, but refused to receive this award due to Partizan's poor results in the group stage of the UEFA Cup.

Jokanović led Partizan to another double in his first full season, winning the league by a margin of 19 points over former team Vojvodina. Thus, he became the first coach in the club's history to successfully defend the title; on 5 September 2009, however, he left the post by mutual consent, bidding farewell through an open letter.

=== Thailand, Bulgaria and Spain ===
On 28 February 2012, Muangthong United introduced Jokanović as their new head coach, and he signed a one-year contract, with an option for a further two years. In his first and only season, he led the team to the third Thai Premier League title in their history, going undefeated in the process.

In mid-July 2013, Jokanović replaced Nikolay Mitov as manager of Bulgarian team Levski Sofia. He was relieved of his duties in October, due to poor results, but club supporters claimed that he should have been given time to change things around.

On 5 May 2014, Hércules appointed Jokanović as coach until the end of the season, replacing Quique Hernández, who had been sacked with the team in last place in the Segunda División table. He only managed one win in his five matches in charge, in an eventual relegation.

=== Watford ===
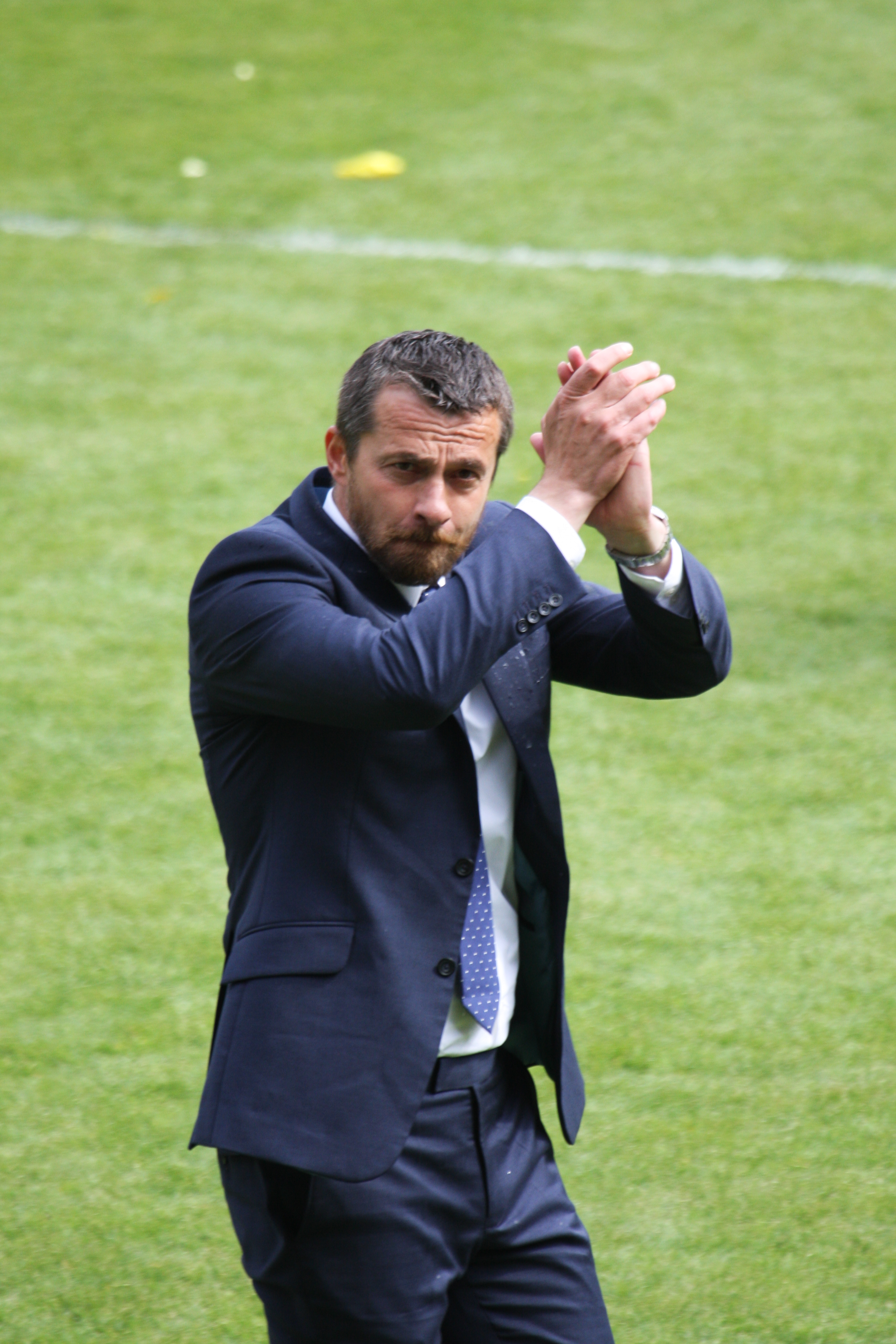
Jokanović as manager of Watford in 2015

On 7 October 2014, Jokanović was appointed on a short-term contract at the helm of English Championship club Watford, their fourth coach in five weeks. Under his leadership, the Hornets were promoted to the Premier League with one match to spare, sealing it with a 2–0 win at Brighton & Hove Albion on 25 April 2015 for their 15th win in twenty matches; the team was also minutes away from winning the league title in the final match, but conceded an injury-time equaliser to Sheffield Wednesday that allowed Bournemouth to overtake them. On 5 June, after failing to agree to a new deal, Jokanović left and was replaced by Quique Sánchez Flores.

=== Maccabi Tel Aviv ===
On 14 June 2015, Jokanović was appointed as coach of Maccabi Tel Aviv. On 25 August, he led the club to the group stage of the UEFA Champions League for the first time in eleven years, after ousting Basel on the away goals rule.

=== Fulham ===
Jokanović lasted just over six months in the role before he elected to return to the Championship, joining Fulham on 27 December 2015 as head coach. After avoiding relegation by eleven points, he achieved his target of a top six position for his first full season at Craven Cottage. He was the EFL Championship Manager of the Month for April 2018 after taking 16 points from 18, having won the same award for Watford three years earlier; his compatriot forward Aleksandar Mitrović took the players' equivalent.

Jokanović led Fulham to promotion by beating Aston Villa 1–0 at Wembley Stadium on 26 May 2018 in the play-off final. On 14 November, however, after seven consecutive winless results, and with the team ranking last, he was dismissed and replaced by Claudio Ranieri.

=== Al-Gharafa ===
On 16 June 2019, Jokanović was appointed at Qatari club Al-Gharafa, on a two-year deal. He was nominated for Manager of the Season in his first year in the Stars League.

=== Sheffield United ===
On 27 May 2021, Jokanović was appointed by newly relegated Sheffield United on a three-year deal, becoming the club's first manager from overseas. He was sacked on 25 November, having won six of 19 Championship games. Paul Heckingbottom replaced him.

=== Dynamo Moscow ===
On 17 June 2022, Jokanović signed a contract with Russian Premier League club Dynamo Moscow for the upcoming season, with the option of two further years depending on performance. He was dismissed by Dynamo on 14 May 2023, following a 0–3 home loss to Akhmat Grozny, with Dynamo in seventh place.

=== Al-Nasr ===
On 8 June 2025, Jokanović was appointed as head coach of UAE Pro League club Al-Nasr.

== Career statistics ==
=== International ===
Appearances and goals by national team and year
| National team | Year | Apps | Goals |
|---|---|---|---|
| SFR Yugoslavia | 1991 | 6 | 0 |
| SFR Yugoslavia | 1992 | 0 | 0 |
| FR Yugoslavia | 1993 | 0 | 0 |
| FR Yugoslavia | 1994 | 2 | 0 |
| FR Yugoslavia | 1995 | 2 | 0 |
| FR Yugoslavia | 1996 | 7 | 2 |
| FR Yugoslavia | 1997 | 11 | 3 |
| FR Yugoslavia | 1998 | 13 | 3 |
| FR Yugoslavia | 1999 | 6 | 0 |
| FR Yugoslavia | 2000 | 9 | 1 |
| FR Yugoslavia | 2001 | 5 | 1 |
| FR Yugoslavia | 2002 | 3 | 0 |
| Total | | 64 | 10 |

Scores and results list FR Yugoslavia's goal tally first, score column indicates score after each Jokanović goal.

List of international goals scored by Slaviša Jokanović
| No. | Date | Venue | Opponent | Score | Result | Competition |
|---|---|---|---|---|---|---|
| 1 | 6 October 1996 | Svangaskarð, Toftir, Faroe Islands | Faroe Islands | 2–0 | 8–1 | 1998 World Cup qualification |
| 2 | 6 October 1996 | Svangaskarð, Toftir, Faroe Islands | Faroe Islands | 6–1 | 8–1 | 1998 World Cup qualification |
| 3 | 12 June 1997 | Olympic Stadium, Seoul, South Korea | Ghana | 1–1 | 3–1 | 1997 Korea Cup |
| 4 | 16 June 1997 | Olympic Stadium, Seoul, South Korea | South Korea | 1–1 | 1–1 | 1997 Korea Cup |
| 5 | 20 August 1997 | Petrovsky, Saint Petersburg, Russia | Russia | 1–0 | 1–0 | Friendly |
| 6 | 28 January 1998 | El Menzah, Tunis, Tunisia | Tunisia | 2–0 | 3–0 | Friendly |
| 7 | 28 January 1998 | El Menzah, Tunis, Tunisia | Tunisia | 3–0 | 3–0 | Friendly |
| 8 | 22 April 1998 | Red Star Stadium, Belgrade, FR Yugoslavia | South Korea | 3–1 | 3–1 | Friendly |
| 9 | 3 September 2000 | Josy Barthel, Luxembourg City, Luxembourg | Luxembourg | 2–0 | 2–0 | 2002 World Cup qualification |
| 10 | 6 October 2001 | Partizan Stadium, Belgrade, FR Yugoslavia | Luxembourg | 1–0 | 6–2 | 2002 World Cup qualification |

== Managerial statistics ==
As of match played 22 November 2026

Managerial record by team and tenure
| Team | From | To | Record | | | | | Ref |
| Team | From | To | P | W | D | L | Win % | Ref |
|---|---|---|---|---|---|---|---|---|
| Partizan | 26 December 2007 | 5 September 2009 | 76 | 54 | 12 | 10 | 71.05 | |
| Muangthong United | 27 February 2012 | 4 June 2013 | 54 | 34 | 12 | 8 | 62.96 | |
| Levski Sofia | 15 July 2013 | 8 October 2013 | 12 | 6 | 4 | 2 | 50.00 | |
| Hércules | 5 May 2014 | 11 June 2014 | 5 | 1 | 1 | 3 | 20.00 | |
| Watford | 7 October 2014 | 5 June 2015 | 36 | 21 | 5 | 10 | 58.33 | |
| Maccabi Tel Aviv | 1 July 2015 | 26 December 2015 | 29 | 13 | 4 | 12 | 44.83 | |
| Fulham | 27 December 2015 | 14 November 2018 | 145 | 64 | 36 | 45 | 44.14 | |
| Al-Gharafa | 1 July 2019 | 27 May 2021 | 54 | 25 | 10 | 19 | 46.30 | |
| Sheffield United | 27 May 2021 | 25 November 2021 | 22 | 8 | 6 | 8 | 36.36 | |
| Dynamo Moscow | 1 July 2022 | 14 May 2023 | 38 | 15 | 11 | 12 | 39.47 | |
| Al-Nasr | 8 June 2025 | 4 June 2026 | 33 | 12 | 12 | 9 | 36.36 | |
| Basel | 25 September 2026 | Present | 6 | 1 | 2 | 3 | 16.67 | |
| Total | | | 510 | 254 | 115 | 141 | 49.80 | |

== Honours ==
=== Player ===
Vojvodina

- Yugoslav First League: 1988–89

Partizan

- First League of FR Yugoslavia: 1992–93
- Yugoslav Cup: 1991–92

Deportivo

- La Liga: 1999–2000
- Supercopa de España: 2000

Chelsea

- FA Cup runner-up: 2001–02

=== Manager ===
Partizan

- Serbian SuperLiga: 2007–08, 2008–09
- Serbian Cup: 2007–08, 2008–09

Muangthong United

- Thai Premier League: 2012

Fulham

- EFL Championship play-offs: 2018

=== Individual ===
- EFL Championship Manager of the Month: April 2015, April 2018
- Thailand Premier League Coach of the Year: 2012
