= Vujadin Stanojković =

Macedonian footballer (born 1963)

Vujadin Stanojkovic
Personal information
- Date of birth: 10 September 1963 (age 63)
- Place of birth: Kumanovo, Yugoslavia
- Height: 1.78 m (5 ft 10 in)
- Position: Right-back

Youth career
- Rečica
- Kumanovo

Senior career*
Years	Team	Apps	(Gls)
1985–1989	Vardar	98	(3)
1989–1993	Partizan	110	(10)
1993–1996	Degerfors	69	(5)
1997–1998	Trelleborg	34	(1)
Total		311	(19)

International career
1988	Yugoslavia Olympic	3	(0)
1988–1992	Yugoslavia	21	(1)
1994–1995	Macedonia	7	(0)

Managerial career
- 2000: Makedonija GP
- 2004–2005: Vardar
- 2006–2009: Macedonia (assistant)
- 2014: Macedonia U21 (caretaker)
- 2015–2016: Macedonia U17
- 2017–2018: Macedonia U19
- * Club domestic league appearances and goals

Vujadin Stanojković (Macedonian: Вујадин Станојковиќ; born 10 September 1963) is a Yugoslav and Macedonian professional footbal player and manager.

== Club career ==
Born in Kumanovo, Stanojković made his Yugoslav First League debuts with Vardar in the 1985–86 season. He won the Yugoslav Championship in 1987 with them, before the title was given to FK Partizan after their six points deduction was reversed.

He spent three more years at the club, before transferring to Partizan in the summer of 1989. He appeared in more than 100 official games over the next four seasons, winning one national championship and one national cup. In 1993, Stanojković moved abroad to Sweden and signed with Degerfors IF, staying there for three years. He also spent two seasons at Trelleborgs FF, before retiring from the game in 1998.

== International career ==
Between 1988 and 1992, Stanojković was capped 21 times for Yugoslavia, scoring once. He took part at the 1990 World Cup, appearing in two games, as the team were eliminated in the quarter-finals by Argentina after penalties. Even after Macedonian independence, he was included in the Yugoslav squad for Euro 1992, but the nation would be suspended due to the Yugoslav Wars.

Following the breakup of Yugoslavia, Stanojković represented his native Macedonia, collecting seven caps from 1994 to 1995. His final international was a June 1995 FIFA World Cup qualification match against Belgium.

== Managerial career ==
From 2004 to 2005, Stanojković was manager of Vardar. He subsequently served as an assistant to Macedonia manager Srečko Katanec between 2006 and 2009.

== Honours ==
Partizan

- First League of FR Yugoslavia: 1992–93
- Yugoslav Cup: 1991–92
- Yugoslav Super Cup: 1989–90
