= Nebojša Gudelj =

Yugoslavian footballer (born 1968)

Personal information
- Date of birth: 23 September 1968 (age 58)
- Place of birth: Trebinje, SR Bosnia and Herzegovina, SFR Yugoslavia
- Height: 1.82 m (6 ft 0 in)
- Position: Left back

Senior career*
Years	Team	Apps	(Gls)
1988–1991	Leotar	87	(7)
1991–1994	Partizan	98	(8)
1994–1996	Logroñés	68	(4)
1996–1997	Leganés	17	(2)
1997–2005	NAC	246	(10)
2005–2006	Sparta	31	(0)
Total		547	(31)

Managerial career
- 2012–2014: NAC
- * Club domestic league appearances and goals

Nebojša Gudelj (Serbian Cyrillic: Небојша Гудељ; born 23 September 1968) is a Serbian football manager and former player.

== Playing career ==
Born in Trebinje, Bosnia and Herzegovina, Gudelj started out at his hometown club Leotar, collecting 87 appearances in the Yugoslav Second League between 1988 and 1991. He subsequently switched to Partizan, winning four trophies with the Crno-beli, including the double in the 1993–94 season. Gudelj played 123 official matches for Partizan.

In the summer of 1994, Gudelj moved abroad and signed with Spanish club Logroñés. He spent two seasons there, before joining fellow Segunda División club Leganés. In the summer of 1997, Gudelj moved to the Netherlands and signed with NAC Breda. He spent the next eight seasons there, appearing in almost 300 official matches for the club. In the 2005–06 season, Gudelj played for Sparta Rotterdam, before retiring from the game.

== Managerial career ==
Gudelj was manager of NAC Breda from November 2012 to October 2014.

He became the manager of Dalian Istar, a youth club, in 2018. In 2021, the club moved to Hubei and merged with Hubei Istar, and he was appointed as the supervisor for first team and youth team.

== Personal life ==
His two sons, Nemanja and Dragiša, are both Serbia international footballers.

== Honours ==
Partizan

- First League of FR Yugoslavia: 1992–93, 1993–94
- FR Yugoslavia Cup: 1991–92, 1993–94

NAC Breda

- Eerste Divisie: 1999–2000
