= Slobodan Krčmarević =

Serbian footballer and manager

Personal information
- Date of birth: 12 June 1965 (age 61)
- Place of birth: Belgrade, SFR Yugoslavia
- Height: 1.80 m (5 ft 11 in)
- Position: Forward

Youth career
- Partizan

Senior career*
Years	Team	Apps	(Gls)
1983–1987	Partizan	2	(0)
1986–1987	→ Bor (loan)	16	(4)
1987–1989	OFK Beograd	57	(24)
1989	Vasalunds IF	24	(16)
1990–1991	OFK Beograd	47	(18)
1991–1993	Partizan	54	(20)
1993–1996	Apollon Limassol	75	(48)
1996–1997	EN Paralimni	23	(16)
1997–1998	Anorthosis	39	(31)
1999–2000	PAOK	15	(3)
1999–2000	→ Panionios (loan)	31	(7)
2000–2001	Anorthosis	22	(13)
Total		405	(200)

Managerial career
- 2003–2005: Partizan (youth)
- 2005–2006: OFK Beograd
- 2007–2009: Serbia U21
- 2010: Apollon Limassol
- 2010: Anorthosis
- 2011–2012: Kazakhstan U21
- 2012: Zhetysu
- 2014: Al-Madina
- 2014–2015: Doxa Katokopias
- 2016: Rudar Velenje
- 2017: Riffa
- 2018: Pobeda
- 2018: Željezničar
- 2023–2024: Aiolikos
- * Club domestic league appearances and goals

Slobodan Krčmarević (Serbian Cyrillic: Слободан Крчмаревић; born 12 June 1965) is a Serbian former professional footballer who played as a forward.

== Club career ==
After coming through the youth system of Partizan, Krčmarević made his first-team debut in the 1983–84 season. He went on loan to Yugoslav Second League side Bor in early 1986 and spent there the next one and a half years. In the summer of 1987, Krčmarević joined OFK Beograd, scoring 24 goals in 57 appearances over the next two seasons in the Second League.

In the summer of 1991, Krčmarević returned to his parent club Partizan. He spent two seasons in his second spell at Stadion JNA and collected two trophies. In the summer of 1993, Krčmarević moved abroad for the second time and joined Cypriot club Apollon Limassol. He was the team's top scorer in each of the following three seasons and won the championship in his debut season.

== International career ==
Krčmarević was additionally called up to Yugoslavia's UEFA Euro 1992 squad. However, the country received a ban just days before the tournament due to the Yugoslav Wars and the team returned home.

== Managerial career ==
After serving as manager of OFK Beograd, Krčmarević spent two years at the helm of the Serbia national under-21 team, between 2007 and 2009. He left the position after the team exited in the group stage at the 2009 UEFA European Under-21 Championship.

From February to October 2010, Krčmarević was manager of Apollon Limassol, winning the Cypriot Cup in the 2009–10 season. He also briefly worked at fellow Cypriot First Division side Anorthosis from November to December of the same year.

In 2011, Krčmarević took charge of the Kazakhstan national under-21 team, signing a contract until the end of 2012. He also simultaneously served as manager at Kazakhstan Premier League side Zhetysu in 2012.

== Career statistics ==
Club	Season	League	
Club	Season	Apps	Goals
Partizan	1983–84	2	0
Partizan	1984–85	0	0
Partizan	Total	2	0
Bor (loan)	1985–86	16	4
Bor (loan)	1986–87		
Bor (loan)	Total	16	4
OFK Beograd	1987–88	32	9
OFK Beograd	1988–89	25	15
OFK Beograd	Total	57	24
Vasalunds IF	1989	24	16
OFK Beograd	1989–90	16	4
OFK Beograd	1990–91	31	14
OFK Beograd	Total	47	18
Partizan	1991–92	27	9
Partizan	1992–93	27	11
Partizan	Total	54	20
Apollon Limassol	1993–94	22	15
Apollon Limassol	1994–95	32	16
Apollon Limassol	1995–96	21	17
Apollon Limassol	Total	75	48
Enosis Neon Paralimni	1996–97	23	16
Anorthosis	1997–98	25	12
Anorthosis	1998–99	14	19
Anorthosis	Total	39	31
PAOK	1998–99	15	3
Panionios	1999–2000	31	7
Anorthosis	2000–01	22	13
Career total		405	200

== Honours ==
=== Player ===
Partizan

- First League of FR Yugoslavia: 1992–93
- Yugoslav Cup: 1991–92

Apollon Limassol

- Cypriot First Division: 1993–94

Anorthosis

- Cypriot First Division: 1997–98
- Cypriot Cup: 1997–98

=== Manager ===
Apollon Limassol

- Cypriot Cup: 2009–10
