= 1991–92 Yugoslav Cup =

1991–92 Yugoslav Football Cup
Tournament details
- Country: Yugoslavia

Final positions
- Champions: Partizan (6th title)
- Runners-up: Red Star

The 1991–92 Football Cup of Yugoslavia was the national knock-out football competition in the Socialist Federal Republic of Yugoslavia, which was held during the breakup of the state.

The republics of Croatia and Slovenia declared their independence on 25 June 1991, during the football off-season. By the Brioni Agreement, the two republics delayed the implementation of independence until 8 October. While the two countries were nominally still part of Yugoslavia, their clubs withdrew from the Yugoslav football system. Over the course of the competition, Macedonia and Bosnia and Herzegovina declared independence on 8 September 1991, and on 5 March 1992, respectively. On 28 April 1992, the Federal Republic of Yugoslavia was constituted by Montenegro and Serbia.

Prior to this season, the cup had borne the name Marshal Tito Cup. This was discontinued as the previous year's champion Hajduk Split had failed to return the Marshal Tito Trophy to the Football Association of Yugoslavia, which no longer had jurisdiction over the club. The trophy was returned to Poljud in 2008, after Hajduk's official and trustee Juko Strinić kept it with himself for 17 years.

== First round ==
Team 1	Score	Team 2
Borac Banja Luka	w/o	Inker Zaprešić
Budućnost Titograd	0–2	Red Star
Crvena Zvezda Gnjilane	w/o	Olimpija Ljubljana
Bečej	5–0	Radnički Niš
Bor	1–3	Zemun
Igman Ilidža	0–3	Partizan
Napredak Kruševac	w/o	Rijeka
Proleter Zrenjanin	w/o	Croatia Đakovo
Selection of JNA	w/o	HAŠK Građanski Zagreb
Sloboda Tuzla	w/o	Hajduk Split
Sutjeska Nikšić	1–0	Sarajevo
Tomislav Tomislavgrad	0–4	Rad
Vardar	w/o	Osijek
Vojvodina	1–0	Sloboda Titovo Užice
Vrbas	1–3	Velež Mostar
Željezničar Sarajevo	w/o	Rovinj

== Second round ==
Team 1	Agg.	Team 2	1st leg	2nd leg
Red Star	6–4	Bečej	4–3	2–1
Zemun	1–2	Željezničar Sarajevo	1–1	0–1
Napredak Kruševac	3–1	Borac Banja Luka	3–0	0–1
Partizan	7–1	Vardar	4–1	3–0
Proleter Zrenjanin	1–2	Sloboda Tuzla	0–0	1–2
Selection of JNA	2–3	Rad	2–0	0–3
Velež Mostar	10–2	Sutjeska Nikšić	6–1	4–1
Vojvodina	10–1	Crvena Zvezda Gnjilane	6–0	4–1

== Quarter-finals ==
Team 1	Agg.	Team 2	1st leg	2nd leg
Napredak Kruševac	4–4	Sloboda Tuzla	3–1	1–3
Partizan	5–2	Vojvodina	4–0	1–2
Rad	2–4	Red Star	2–1	0–3
Velež Mostar	2–3	Željezničar Sarajevo	1–0	1–3

== Semi-finals ==
Team 1	Agg.	Team 2	1st leg	2nd leg
Napredak Kruševac	2–3	Red Star	2–2	0–1
Partizan	5–0	Željezničar Sarajevo	2–0	3–0^{1}

1 Return leg was scheduled to be played on 6 May 1992, but due to Bosnian War and Željezničar club leaving the competition, it was not, hence Partizan were awarded the 3-0 win.

== Final ==
=== First leg ===
14 May 1992

Red Star	0–1	Partizan
	Report	Vujačić 36'

Red Star Stadium, Belgrade
Attendance: 33,024
Referee: Sava Avramović (Belgrade)

Red Star	Partizan

RED STAR:
GK	1	(Federal Republic of Yugoslavia) Dragoje Leković
DF	2	(Federal Republic of Yugoslavia) Duško Radinović
DF	3	(Federal Republic of Yugoslavia) Goran Vasilijević
MF	4	(Federal Republic of Yugoslavia) Vladimir Jugović
MF	5	(Federal Republic of Yugoslavia) Milorad Ratković
DF	6	(North Macedonia) Ilija Najdoski
FW	7	(Federal Republic of Yugoslavia) Ilija Ivić
FW	8	(Bosnia and Herzegovina) Elvir Bolić
FW	9	(North Macedonia) Darko Pančev
MF	10	(Federal Republic of Yugoslavia) Dejan Savićević	(substituted off) 6'
MF	11	(Federal Republic of Yugoslavia) Siniša Mihajlović	(substituted off) 49'
Substitutes:
DF		(Federal Republic of Yugoslavia) Saša Nedeljković	(substituted on) 6'
MF		(Federal Republic of Yugoslavia) Slaviša Čula	(substituted on) 49'
Manager:
(Federal Republic of Yugoslavia) Vladica Popović

PARTIZAN:
GK	1	(Bosnia and Herzegovina) Fahrudin Omerović
DF	2	(North Macedonia) Vujadin Stanojković
DF	3	(Federal Republic of Yugoslavia) Budimir Vujačić
MF	4	(Slovenia) Džoni Novak
DF	5	(Federal Republic of Yugoslavia) Gordan Petrić
MF	6	(Federal Republic of Yugoslavia) Slaviša Jokanović
MF	7	(Federal Republic of Yugoslavia) Goran Bogdanović
FW	8	(Federal Republic of Yugoslavia) Predrag Mijatović	(substituted off) 89'
FW	9	(Federal Republic of Yugoslavia) Slađan Šćepović
DF	10	(Federal Republic of Yugoslavia) Branko Brnović
MF	11	(Federal Republic of Yugoslavia) Slobodan Krčmarević
Substitutes:
DF		(Federal Republic of Yugoslavia) Nebojša Gudelj	(substituted on) 89'
Manager:
(Bosnia and Herzegovina) Ivica Osim

=== Second leg ===
21 May 1992

Partizan	2–2	Red Star
Mijatović 65'; Jokanović 76'	Report	Mihajlović 37'; Pančev 71'

JNA Stadium, Belgrade
Attendance: 39,370
Referee: Zoran Petrović (Belgrade)

Partizan	Red Star

PARTIZAN:
GK	1	(Bosnia and Herzegovina) Fahrudin Omerović
DF	2	(North Macedonia) Vujadin Stanojković
DF	3	(Federal Republic of Yugoslavia) Nebojša Gudelj
MF	4	(Slovenia) Džoni Novak
DF	5	(Federal Republic of Yugoslavia) Gordan Petrić
MF	6	(Federal Republic of Yugoslavia) Slaviša Jokanović
MF	7	(Federal Republic of Yugoslavia) Goran Bogdanović	(substituted off) 88'
FW	8	(Federal Republic of Yugoslavia) Predrag Mijatović
FW	9	(Federal Republic of Yugoslavia) Slađan Šćepović	(substituted off) 53'
DF	10	(Federal Republic of Yugoslavia) Branko Brnović
MF	11	(Federal Republic of Yugoslavia) Slobodan Krčmarević
Substitutes:
FW		(Federal Republic of Yugoslavia) Ljubomir Vorkapić	(substituted on) 53'
MF		(Federal Republic of Yugoslavia) Slobodan Miletić	(substituted on) 88'
Manager:
(Bosnia and Herzegovina) Ivica Osim

RED STAR:
GK	1	(Federal Republic of Yugoslavia) Dragoje Leković
DF	2	(Federal Republic of Yugoslavia) Duško Radinović
DF	3	(North Macedonia) Mitko Stojkovski	(substituted off) 35'
MF	4	(Federal Republic of Yugoslavia) Vladimir Jugović
DF	5	(Romania) Miodrag Belodedić
DF	6	(Federal Republic of Yugoslavia) Aleksandar Kristić
FW	7	(Federal Republic of Yugoslavia) Ilija Ivić
FW	8	(Bosnia and Herzegovina) Elvir Bolić
FW	9	(North Macedonia) Darko Pančev
MF	10	(Federal Republic of Yugoslavia) Milorad Ratković
MF	11	(Federal Republic of Yugoslavia) Siniša Mihajlović
Substitutes:
DF		(Federal Republic of Yugoslavia) Goran Vasilijević	(substituted on) 35'
Manager:
(Federal Republic of Yugoslavia) Vladica Popović

On 23 May 1992; after the Cup final, the manager of the winning side; FK Partizan, Ivica Osim resigned from his managerial duties with the club.

== See also ==
- 1991–92 Yugoslav First League
- 1991–92 Yugoslav Second League
