= Branko Brnović =

Montenegrin footballer (born 1967)

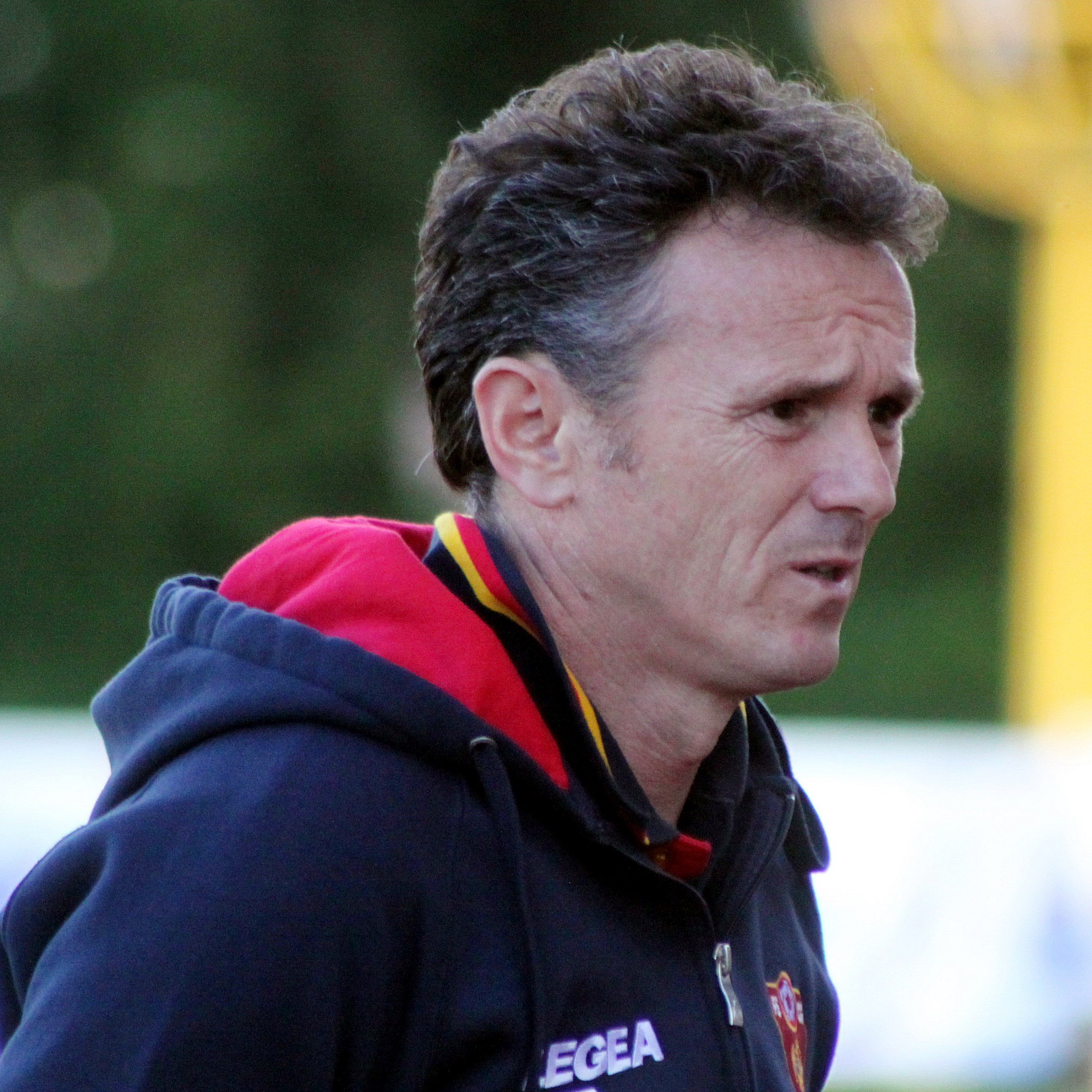
- Brnović during a match with Montenegro in 2014

Personal information
- Full name: Branko Brnović
- Date of birth: 8 August 1967 (age 59)
- Place of birth: Titograd, SFR Yugoslavia
- Height: 1.82 m (5 ft 11 1/2 in)
- Position: Defensive midfielder

Senior career*
Years	Team	Apps	(Gls)
1987–1991	Budućnost	100	(13)
1991–1994	Partizan	88	(11)
1994–2000	Espanyol	146	(3)
2006–2007	Kom	15	(2)
Total		349	(29)

International career
1987	Yugoslavia U20	5	(0)
1989–1998	FR Yugoslavia (Note: Including 6 caps for SFR Yugoslavia.)	27	(3)

Managerial career
- 2007–2011: Montenegro (assistant)
- 2011–2015: Montenegro
- 2018–2019: Budućnost
Medal record
Representing Yugoslavia
Gold medal – first place	FIFA U-20 World Cup	1987
Silver medal – second place	UEFA U-21 Euro	1990
- * Club domestic league appearances and goals

Branko Brnović (Cyrillic: Бранко Брновић; born 8 August 1967) is a Montenegrin manager and retired professional footballer who played as a defensive midfielder.

== Club career ==
After making his professional debuts with local club Budućnost, Brnović signed with national giants Partizan in 1991, helping the latter club to back-to-back national championships, with the addition of two cups. In the 1992–93 season, as it won the league and lost the domestic cup to city rivals Red Star, he scored a career-best six goals (the team netted 103).

In 1994, Brnović moved abroad and joined RCD Espanyol in La Liga – then known as Español. A starter in four of his six seasons in Spain, he left after a poor individual campaign (only one game in the league), which ended with conquest of the Copa del Rey.

Brnović came out of retirement in 2006 to play one season for Montenegrin club Kom.

== International career ==
Brnović represented Yugoslavia on 27 occasions, his debut coming on 20 September 1989 in a 3–0 friendly win with Greece in Novi Sad. He also appeared during the UEFA Euro 1992 qualifying stage as the nation made it all the way to Sweden. He was included in the final tournament, but the team would be suspended due to the Yugoslav Wars.

Subsequently, Brnović was selected for the 1998 FIFA World Cup in France and appeared in three games in an eventual round-of-16 exit. Additionally, he was a member of the talented Yugoslav under-20 team that won the 1987 FIFA World Youth Championship in Chile, playing five matches in the tournament.

On 5 March 2007, Brnović was appointed assistant manager of Montenegro. On 8 September 2011, he became head coach after Zlatko Kranjčar was sacked, leading the side to the Euro 2012 playoffs, where they lost 0–3 on aggregate to the Czech Republic.

On 17 December 2015, it was announced that Brnović's contract, due to expire at the end of the year, would not be renewed.

=== International ===
Appearances and goals by national team and year
National team	Year	Apps	Goals
Yugoslavia	1989	2	0
Yugoslavia	1990	–	
Yugoslavia	1991	3	0
Yugoslavia	1992	1	0
Yugoslavia	Total	6	0
FR Yugoslavia	1994	2	0
FR Yugoslavia	1995	1	0
FR Yugoslavia	1996	5	0
FR Yugoslavia	1997	5	1
FR Yugoslavia	1998	8	2
FR Yugoslavia	Total	21	3

Scores and results list FR Yugoslavia's goal tally first, score column indicates score after each Brnović goal.

List of international goals scored by Branko Brnović
No.	Date	Venue	Opponent	Score	Result	Competition
1	29 October 1997	Üllői úti stadion, Budapest, Hungary	Hungary	1–0	7–1	1998 FIFA World Cup qualification
2	28 January 1998	El Menzah Stadium, Tunis, Tunisia	Tunisia	1–0	3–0	Friendly
3	6 June 1998	St. Jakob Stadium, Basel, Switzerland	Switzerland	1–0	1–1	Friendly

=== Managerial ===
As of 28 October 2019

Team	From	To	Record				
Team	From	To	G	W	D	L	Win %
Montenegro	8 September 2011	17 December 2015	33	11	10	12	33.33
Budućnost	7 October 2018	28 October 2019	37	20	10	7	54.05
Total			70	31	20	19	44.29
