= 1993–94 FK Partizan season =

Partizan
1993–94 season
- President: Ivan Ćurković
- Head coach: Ljubiša Tumbaković
- First League of FR Yugoslavia: Winners
- FR Yugoslavia Cup: Winners
- Top goalscorer: League: All: Savo Milošević

The 1993–94 season was the 48th season in FK Partizan's existence. This article shows player statistics and matches that the club played during the 1993–94 season.

== Players ==
=== Squad information ===
players (league matches/league goals):
(Bosnia and Herzegovina) Nebojša Gudelj (34/4)
(Federal Republic of Yugoslavia) Petar Vasiljević (34/2)
(Federal Republic of Yugoslavia) Saša Ćurčić (33/7)
(Federal Republic of Yugoslavia) Bratislav Mijalković (33/0)
(Federal Republic of Yugoslavia) Savo Milošević (32/21)
(Federal Republic of Yugoslavia) Dejan Čurović (32/19)
(Federal Republic of Yugoslavia) Goran Pandurović (32/0) -goalkeeper-
(Federal Republic of Yugoslavia) Branko Brnović (31/9)
(Federal Republic of Yugoslavia) Dragan Ćirić (31/6)
(Federal Republic of Yugoslavia) Albert Nađ (30/2)
(Federal Republic of Yugoslavia) Zoran Mirković (26/0)
(Federal Republic of Yugoslavia) Darko Tešović (24/4)
(Federal Republic of Yugoslavia) Nenad Bjeković Jr. (19/4)
(Federal Republic of Yugoslavia) Đorđe Tomić (18/1)
(Federal Republic of Yugoslavia) Miroslav Čermelj (11/0)
(Federal Republic of Yugoslavia) Gordan Petrić (10/1) sold to Dundee United during late fall 1993
(Federal Republic of Yugoslavia) Ljubomir Vorkapić (8/0)
(Federal Republic of Yugoslavia) Đorđe Svetličić (5/0)
(Federal Republic of Yugoslavia) Ivan Tomić (4/1)
(North Macedonia) Saša Ilić (4/0) -goalkeeper-
(Federal Republic of Yugoslavia) Dalibor Škorić (4/0)
(Federal Republic of Yugoslavia) Saša Đuričić (2/0)

== Competitions ==
=== First League of FR Yugoslavia ===
| Pos | Team | Pld | W | D | L | GF | GA | GD | BP | Pts |
|---|---|---|---|---|---|---|---|---|---|---|
| 1 | Partizan (C) | 18 | 13 | 3 | 2 | 44 | 10 | +34 | 13 | 42 |
| 2 | Red Star Belgrade | 18 | 12 | 2 | 4 | 40 | 18 | +22 | 11 | 37 |
| 3 | Vojvodina | 18 | 8 | 5 | 5 | 29 | 19 | +10 | 10 | 31 |
| 4 | OFK Beograd | 18 | 7 | 3 | 8 | 21 | 26 | −5 | 7 | 24 |
| 5 | Spartak Subotica | 18 | 6 | 5 | 7 | 22 | 26 | −4 | 6 | 23 |

Source: RSSSF.org
(C) Champions

==== Matches ====
| 22 August 1993 1 | Partizan | 4–0 | Radnički Niš | Belgrade |

| 29 August 1993 2 | Partizan | 3–3 | Budućnost Podgorica | Belgrade |

| 5 September 1993 3 | Hajduk Kula | 2–4 | Partizan | Kula |

| 12 September 1993 4 | Partizan | 1–0 | Proleter Zrenjanin | Belgrade |

| 19 September 1993 5 | Napredak Kruševac | 1–3 | Partizan | Kruševac |

| 26 September 1993 6 | Partizan | 0–2 | Crvena zvezda | Belgrade |
| | | | Ivić 3'; Petković 43' | Stadium: JNA Stadium; Attendance: 40,000 |

| 2 October 1993 7 | Zemun | 0–2 | Partizan | Belgrade |

| 10 October 1993 8 | Partizan | 3–2 | Rad | Belgrade |

| 17 October 1993 9 | Vojvodina | 0–0 | Partizan | Novi Sad |

| 24 October 1993 10 | Radnički Niš | 1–1 | Partizan | Niš |

| 31 October 1993 11 | Budućnost Podgorica | 0–1 | Partizan | Podgorica |

| 7 November 1993 12 | Partizan | 1–1 | Hajduk Kula | Belgrade |

| 14 November 1993 13 | Proleter Zrenjanin | 1–1 | Partizan | Zrenjanin |

| 21 November 1993 14 | Partizan | 3–0 | Napredak Kruševac | Belgrade |

| 27 November 1993 15 | Crvena zvezda | 1–1 | Partizan | Belgrade |
| | Petković 83' | | Brnović 30' | Stadium: Marakana; Attendance: 30,000 |

| 5 December 1993 16 | Partizan | 2–1 | Zemun | Belgrade |

| 8 December 1993 17 | Rad | 0–2 | Partizan | Belgrade |

| 12 December 1993 18 | Partizan | 4–2 | Vojvodina | Belgrade |

| 16 January 1994 19 | Partizan | 4–0 | Spartak Subotica | Belgrade |

| 23 January 1994 20 | Partizan | 1–0 | Budućnost Podgorica | Belgrade |

| 29 January 1994 21 | Radnički Jugopetrol | 1–2 | Partizan | Belgrade |

| 6 February 1994 22 | Partizan | 7–0 | Proleter Zrenjanin | Belgrade |

| 12 February 1994 23 | Bečej | 0–1 | Partizan | Bečej |

| 27 February 1994 24 | Partizan | 1–0 | Crvena zvezda | Belgrade |
| | Brnović 84' | | | Stadium: JNA Stadium; Attendance: 50,000 |

| 5 March 1994 25 | Zemun | 1–1 | Partizan | Belgrade |

| 13 March 1994 26 | Partizan | 3–0 | OFK Beograd | Belgrade |

| 19 March 1994 27 | Vojvodina | 1–0 | Partizan | Novi Sad |

| 27 March 1994 28 | Spartak Subotica | 1–3 | Partizan | Subotica |

| 2 April 1994 29 | Budućnost Podgorica | 1–2 | Partizan | Podgorica |

| 10 April 1994 30 | Partizan | 7–0 | Radnički Jugopetrol | Belgrade |

| 17 April 1994 31 | Proleter Zrenjanin | 0–0 | Partizan | Zrenjanin |

| 24 April 1994 32 | Partizan | 5–0 | Bečej | Belgrade |

| 30 April 1994 33 | Crvena zvezda | 3–2 | Partizan | Belgrade |
| | Vidaković 1'; Ivić 15', 32' | | Milošević 20'; Ćirić 40' | Stadium: Marakana; Attendance: 30,000 |

| 8 May 1994 34 | Zemun | 0–2 | Partizan | Belgrade |

| 15 May 1994 35 | OFK Beograd | 1–1 | Partizan | Belgrade |

| 22 May 1994 36 | Partizan | 2–1 | Vojvodina | Belgrade |

=== FR Yugoslavia Cup ===
| 15 August 1993 Round of 32 | Borac Banja Luka | 0–3 | Partizan | Banja Luka |

| 8 September 1993 Round of 16 1st leg | Bečej | 1–0 | Partizan | Bečej |

| 21 September 1993 Round of 16 2nd leg | Partizan | 2–0 (2–1 agg.) | Bečej | Belgrade |

| 13 October 1993 Quarter finals 1st leg | OFK Beograd | 1–4 | Partizan | Belgrade |

| 27 October 1993 Quarter finals 2nd leg | Partizan | 3–0 (7–1 agg.) | OFK Beograd | Belgrade |

| 9 March 1994 Semi finals 1st leg | Crvena zvezda | 1–0 | Partizan | Belgrade |
| | Vasilijević 45' | | | Stadium: Marakana; Attendance: 50,000 |

| 6 April 1994 Semi finals 2nd leg | Partizan | 3–1 (3–2 agg.) | Crvena zvezda | Belgrade |
| | Milošević 36', 85'; Vasiljević 89' | | Ivić 77' | Stadium: JNA Stadium; Attendance: 35,000 |

| 4 May 1994 Final 1st leg | Spartak Subotica | 2–3 | Partizan | Subotica |
| | Milidrag 32'; Nestorović 38' | | Čurović 10'; Milošević 45'; Ćirić 54' | Stadium: Subotica City Stadium; Attendance: 12,000; Referee: Branimir Babarogić |

| 11 May 1994 Final 2nd leg | Partizan | 6–1 (9–3 agg.) | Spartak Subotica | Belgrade |
| | Milošević 17' (pen.), 39', 86'; Čurović 31', 43', 85' | | Puhalak 73' | Stadium: JNA Stadium; Attendance: 8,000; Referee: Zdravko Jokić |

== See also ==
- List of FK Partizan seasons
