= 1994–95 FK Partizan season =

Partizan
1994–95 season
- President: Ivan Ćurković
- Head coach: Ljubiša Tumbaković
- First League of FR Yugoslavia: Runners-up
- FR Yugoslavia Cup: Quarter-finals
- Top goalscorer: League: All: Savo Milošević

The 1994–95 season was the 49th season in FK Partizan's existence. This article shows player statistics and matches that the club played during the 1994–95 season.

== Friendlies ==
15 November 1994 Friendly	Partizan (Federal Republic of Yugoslavia)	3–0	(Scotland) Dundee United	Belgrade
	Nađ 12'; Ćirić 26'; Ćurčić 85'			Stadium: JNA Stadium; Attendance: 37,000; Referee: Dragan Simić

20 December 1994 Friendly	Dundee United (Scotland)	0–1	(Federal Republic of Yugoslavia) Partizan	Dundee, Scotland
			Ćurčić 21'

22 December 1994 Friendly	Queen of the South (Scotland)	0–4	(Federal Republic of Yugoslavia) Partizan	Dumfries, Scotland

2 April 1995 Friendly	Vardar (North Macedonia)	3–4	(Federal Republic of Yugoslavia) Partizan	Skopje, Macedonia

== Competitions ==
=== First League of FR Yugoslavia ===
Pos	Team	Pld	W	D	L	GF	GA	GD	BP	Pts	Qualification or relegation
1	Red Star (C)	18	14	3	1	63	17	+46	11	42	Qualification for UEFA Cup preliminary round
2	Partizan	18	13	2	3	43	17	+26	10	38	
3	Vojvodina	18	10	4	4	37	26	+11	13	37	
4	Bečej	18	7	4	7	17	27	−10	8	26	Qualification for Intertoto Cup group stage
5	Zemun	18	6	5	7	24	25	−1	7	24	

(C) Champions

20 August 1994	Partizan (Socialist Federal Republic of Yugoslavia)	7–0	(Socialist Federal Republic of Yugoslavia) Zemun	JNA

27 August 1994	Partizan (Socialist Federal Republic of Yugoslavia)	2–1	(Socialist Federal Republic of Yugoslavia) Radnicki Nis	JNA

3 September 1994	Rad (Socialist Federal Republic of Yugoslavia)	1–1	(Socialist Federal Republic of Yugoslavia) Partizan

10 September 1994	Partizan (Socialist Federal Republic of Yugoslavia)	1–0	(Socialist Federal Republic of Yugoslavia) Napredak	JNA

17 September 1994	OFK Beograd (Socialist Federal Republic of Yugoslavia)	0–5	(Socialist Federal Republic of Yugoslavia) Partizan

24 September 1994	Partizan (Socialist Federal Republic of Yugoslavia)	1–1	(Socialist Federal Republic of Yugoslavia) Crvena Zvezda	JNA

1 October 1994	Vojvodina (Socialist Federal Republic of Yugoslavia)	4–3	(Socialist Federal Republic of Yugoslavia) Partizan	Karadjordje

8 October 1994	Partizan (Socialist Federal Republic of Yugoslavia)	3–0	(Socialist Federal Republic of Yugoslavia) Spartak	JNA

15 October 1994	Rudar (Socialist Federal Republic of Yugoslavia)	1–1	(Socialist Federal Republic of Yugoslavia) Partizan

22 October 1994	Zemun (Socialist Federal Republic of Yugoslavia)	0–0	(Socialist Federal Republic of Yugoslavia) Partizan

29 October 1994	Radnicki Nis (Socialist Federal Republic of Yugoslavia)	2–1	(Socialist Federal Republic of Yugoslavia) Partizan

5 November 1994	Partizan (Socialist Federal Republic of Yugoslavia)	3–0	(Socialist Federal Republic of Yugoslavia) Rad	JNA

12 November 1994	Napredak (Socialist Federal Republic of Yugoslavia)	0–4	(Socialist Federal Republic of Yugoslavia) Partizan

19 November 1994	Partizan (Socialist Federal Republic of Yugoslavia)	0–0	(Socialist Federal Republic of Yugoslavia) OFK Beograd	JNA

26 November 1994	Crvena Zvezda (Socialist Federal Republic of Yugoslavia)	3–2	(Socialist Federal Republic of Yugoslavia) Partizan

3 December 1994	Partizan (Socialist Federal Republic of Yugoslavia)	3–1	(Socialist Federal Republic of Yugoslavia) Vojvodina	JNA

10 December 1994	Spartak (Socialist Federal Republic of Yugoslavia)	0–1	(Socialist Federal Republic of Yugoslavia) Partizan

17 December 1994	Partizan (Socialist Federal Republic of Yugoslavia)	4–1	(Socialist Federal Republic of Yugoslavia) Rudar	JNA

11 February 1995	Zemun (Socialist Federal Republic of Yugoslavia)	1–2	(Socialist Federal Republic of Yugoslavia) Partizan

18 February 1995	Partizan (Socialist Federal Republic of Yugoslavia)	3–0	(Socialist Federal Republic of Yugoslavia) Becej	JNA

25 February 1995	Rad (Socialist Federal Republic of Yugoslavia)	1–3	(Socialist Federal Republic of Yugoslavia) Partizan

3 March 1995	Partizan (Socialist Federal Republic of Yugoslavia)	1–1	(Socialist Federal Republic of Yugoslavia) Borac	JNA

11 March 1995	OFK Beograd (Socialist Federal Republic of Yugoslavia)	2–1	(Socialist Federal Republic of Yugoslavia) Partizan

18 March 1995	Partizan (Socialist Federal Republic of Yugoslavia)	2–2	(Socialist Federal Republic of Yugoslavia) Crvena Zvezda	JNA

25 March 1995	Vojvodina (Socialist Federal Republic of Yugoslavia)	1–3	(Socialist Federal Republic of Yugoslavia) Partizan

5 April 1995	Partizan (Socialist Federal Republic of Yugoslavia)	4–1	(Socialist Federal Republic of Yugoslavia) Hajduk Kula	JNA

9 April 1995	Radnicki NB (Socialist Federal Republic of Yugoslavia)	1–2	(Socialist Federal Republic of Yugoslavia) Partizan

12 April 1995	Zemun (Socialist Federal Republic of Yugoslavia)	2–1	(Socialist Federal Republic of Yugoslavia) Partizan

15 April 1995	Becej (Socialist Federal Republic of Yugoslavia)	0–2	(Socialist Federal Republic of Yugoslavia) Partizan

22 April 1995	Partizan (Socialist Federal Republic of Yugoslavia)	3–0	(Socialist Federal Republic of Yugoslavia) Rad	JNA

29 April 1995	Borac (Socialist Federal Republic of Yugoslavia)	0-1	(Socialist Federal Republic of Yugoslavia) Partizan

3 May 1995	Partizan (Socialist Federal Republic of Yugoslavia)	4–0	(Socialist Federal Republic of Yugoslavia) OFK Beograd	JNA

6 May 1995	Crvena Zvezda (Socialist Federal Republic of Yugoslavia)	2–1	(Socialist Federal Republic of Yugoslavia) Partizan

13 May 1995	Partizan (Socialist Federal Republic of Yugoslavia)	4–2	(Socialist Federal Republic of Yugoslavia) Vojvodina	JNA

20 May 1995	Hajduk Kula (Socialist Federal Republic of Yugoslavia)	0–1	(Socialist Federal Republic of Yugoslavia) Partizan

28 May 1995	Partizan (Socialist Federal Republic of Yugoslavia)	5–1	(Socialist Federal Republic of Yugoslavia) Radnicki NB	JNA

=== FR Yugoslavia Cup ===
14 August 1994 Round of 32	Partizan	3–0	Sutjeska	Belgrade

21 September 1994 Round of 16 1st leg	Partizan	10–0	Iskra Danilovgrad	Belgrade

4 October 1994 Round of 16 2nd leg	Iskra Danilovgrad	0–3 (0–13 agg.)	Partizan	Danilovgrad

26 October 1994 Quarter finals 1st leg	Crvena zvezda	2–0	Partizan	Belgrade
	Krupniković 41', 83'			Stadium: Marakana; Attendance: 55,000

9 November 1994 Quarter finals 2nd leg	Partizan	3–3 (3–5 agg.)	Crvena zvezda	Belgrade
	Tešović 14'; Nađ 64'; Milošević 78'		Perović 52'; P. Stanković 75'; Živković 84'	Stadium: JNA Stadium; Attendance: 50,000

== See also ==
- List of FK Partizan seasons
