= Saša Ćurčić =

Serbian footballer

Personal information
- Date of birth: 14 February 1972 (age 54)
- Place of birth: Belgrade, SR Serbia, SFR Yugoslavia
- Height: 1.78 m (5 ft 10 in)
- Position: Midfielder

Youth career
- 25. maj Kovilovo
- Pionir Besni Fok
- Trudbenik
- OFK Beograd

Senior career*
Years	Team	Apps	(Gls)
1991–1993	OFK Beograd	59	(5)
1993–1995	Partizan	74	(14)
1995–1996	Bolton Wanderers	28	(4)
1996–1998	Aston Villa	29	(0)
1998–1999	Crystal Palace	23	(5)
1999	MetroStars	9	(2)
2000	Motherwell	5	(0)
Total		227	(30)

International career
1991–1998	FR Yugoslavia (Note: Including 1 cap for SFR Yugoslavia.)	14	(1)

Managerial career
- 2021–2022: Borac Lazarevac
- * Club domestic league appearances and goals

Saša Ćurčić (Serbian Cyrillic: Саша Ћурчић; born 14 February 1972) is a Serbian former professional footballer, coach and reality television personality.

As a player, he was a midfielder who notably played in the Premier League for Bolton Wanderers. He was Aston Villa's record signing before playing for Crystal Palace. He also played in the Scottish Premiership for Motherwell, in Major League Soccer for the MetroStars and in his native country for OFK Beograd and Partizan. He was also capped 14 times for the national team of FR Yugoslavia. Since retirement, Ćurčić has appeared as a reality tv personality and has appeared on Serbian versions of Celebrity Big Brother and The Farm as well as Parovi.

== Early life ==
Growing up on the banks of Danube in the Belgrade suburb of Besni Fok, Ćurčić was a lively kid who took to football very early. His involvement with the sport came at the expense of everything else, including school as he only completed primary education. After playing youth football with several local area clubs, he caught the attention of OFK Beograd, a more established club that included Ćurčić in their youth system. In a 1991 interview for Tempo, Ćurčić (then with OFK Beograd) admitted to have been a Red Star Belgrade fan since adolescence — however, later on after transferring to FK Partizan, he repeatedly stated to have always been a FK Partizan supporter.

== Club career ==
=== OFK Beograd ===
Nineteen-year-old Ćurčić cracked OFK Beograd's first team towards the end of the 1990–91 season while the club played in the Yugoslav Second League under head coach Ilija Petković. Ćurčić featured in three matches that season. Despite failing to gain promotion on the pitch, OFK still got to play in the Yugoslav First League for the following 1991–92 season due to the withdrawal of Slovenian and Croatian teams (a season that would turn out to be the last in SFR Yugoslavia). Against the backdrop of a country falling apart, Ćurčić became first team regular, playing 24 league matches and scoring two goals. His talent and exuberance turned some heads, including the national team head coach Ivica Osim who gave Ćurčić his international debut on 30 October 1991 in an away friendly versus Brazil. He continued improving during the 1992–93 season (first one in FR Yugoslavia) with 3 goals from 32 league appearances, earning himself a big time summer 1993 move to Yugoslav champions FK Partizan.

=== Partizan ===
Coached by Ljubiša Tumbaković, Partizan was in a transitional phase despite coming off the title winning campaign. With team leader Predrag Mijatović leaving for Valencia CF and other important players like Vujadin Stanojković and Zlatko Zahovič departing as well, it was up to the new arrivals to carry the torch. For his part, Ćurčić responded with a fine overall season (seven goals from 33 league matches), contributing greatly to another Partizan league title with key assists and buildup play. The following season (1994–95) brought more steady play from Ćurčić (five goals from 31 league matches) as the offers from abroad started coming in for his services.

He began the 1995–96 season at Partizan (his third with the club), but in October 1995 after 10 league matches (two goals), Bolton Wanderers put in a £1.5 million transfer bid (Bolton's record fee at the time) and he was on his way to England signed by the managerial team of Colin Todd and Roy McFarland.

=== Bolton Wanderers ===
Making his Bolton debut at the club's Burnden Park stadium on 31 October 1995 versus Arsenal in the Premiership, Ćurčić quickly settled into the new surroundings. Only nine days later he scored his first goal in English football during League Cup third round replay away at Leicester City. The same month he opened his scoring account in the Premier League with a great individual effort versus Chelsea to put Bolton ahead at Stamford Bridge though the visitors still lost 3–2 in the end.

Entering the 1995–96 campaign, Bolton was a club of modest expectations simply trying to survive its first ever season in Premiership. At the time of Ćurčić's arrival, two months into the season, they were in the middle of a bad losing streak, firmly tied to the bottom of the table. His distinguished season-long form didn't help much as Bolton were easily relegated at the end, despite some results improvement following a mid-season managerial change (McFarland leaving the co-managerial team). The Serb had another shining moment towards the end of the season in April 1996, again versus Chelsea in the league, scoring another great goal against the London opposition, this time at home at Burnden Park. The goal proved to be a winning one as Bolton held on for a 2–1 win this time. So, despite Bolton's relegation, the season proved a success for Ćurčić individually, with seven goals from 33 appearances in all competitions with assists, surging runs, technical ability, and selfless teamwork as the staples of his game. Following the 0–3 FA Cup third round win away at Bradford City on 6 January 1996, where Ćurčić scored two goals, the opposition's manager Chris Kamara called Ćurčić – "a Serbian George Best".

In addition to playing at a high level, Ćurčić also established himself as a fan favourite, all of which made his departure from the club all the more emotional. Not too keen on playing football in the second-tier First Division, in August 1996, he joined Aston Villa for £4 million.

=== Aston Villa ===
Joining former Partizan teammate Savo Milošević at Villa Park, Ćurčić struggled to settle in. Playing on £11,000 weekly wages, he made his Villa debut in the Premier League against Derby County on 24 August 1996, going on to appear in 22 league matches for the club during the 1996–97 season mostly deployed in central midfield alongside Mark Draper and Ian Taylor. Still, Ćurčić experienced a hard time holding a regular first team place as his form from his Bolton days was nowhere to be found. Frustrated with the way things were going, in early January 1998, he labeled his move from Bolton to Villa "the biggest mistake I've made in my life" and publicly demanded that he be placed on the transfer list. Although he soon withdrew the request and made up with manager Brian Little followed by a fine performance in the 3–0 FA Cup third round replay win versus Notts County during late January (and scoring his first and what turned out to be only Villa goal in the next round against Derby County), Ćurčić was placed on the transfer list in late February.

His second season at the club turned out to be even worse. Villa manager Brian Little and Ćurčić never saw eye to eye, but by the time the 1997–98 season started their tense relations turned into a full blown feud. In late August 1997, Ćurčić relaunched his attack on Villa manager in the press, saying he's fed up with the way Little and the directors have treated him by not allowing him an opportunity to show what he can do. Little didn't take such public action kindly and although they made up again after meeting in private with Ćurčić even publicly admitting that he at last settled down at the club, it was obvious that their relationship deteriorated to a point of no repair. As a result, Ćurčić would go on to make only seven league appearances, mostly as a substitute, in addition to a few UEFA Cup outings where he had some decent performances. Little resigned in February 1998, but Ćurčić's fate at Villa had already been sealed for a while and there was no reprieve for him under new manager John Gregory. On 26 March 1998 he was sold to Crystal Palace for £1 million. On leaving Villa, Ćurčić still had some words for his former manager:

The way Brian Little played me was very strange. I could never understand it. He knew I was better in a free role. He should have played me like a McManaman or a Cantona. I was never given a chance to show what I could do – and that will always baffle me.

In the end, Ćurčić's time at Villa is more remembered for his wild lifestyle and eccentric behaviour than anything football related. The trappings of sudden prominence and fortune didn't pass him by and in later interviews he admitted to drug use and out of control partying during his Birmingham days. One of the bigger oddities of his Villa period was his purchase of a double-decker bus, which he used to throw parties.

In July 2007, The Times came out with its list of 50 worst Premier League transfers of all time (period covering 1992–2007): Ćurčić's move from Bolton to Villa made the 16th spot.

=== Crystal Palace ===
Ćurčić's arrival at Crystal Palace came toward the end of the 1997–98 Premiership season. Palace were struggling near the bottom of the table, without a win at Selhurst Park all season prior to his arrival. Ćurčić made an immediate impact, notably with a fine performance against Derby County in which Palace finally recorded a home win. His charisma and quality made him a favourite with the fans, but his application to Palace's fight against relegation at times was questionable. The club were relegated to the Football League amidst a doomed takeover by Mark Goldberg that eventually led to administration, but Ćurčić remained at the club.

During spring 1999, he famously paraded around the pitch with a placard stating, "Yugoslavia – STOP NATO BOMBING" to protest the ongoing NATO bombing of FR Yugoslavia. By that time he appeared to have lost interest in football, being reduced to a handful of substitute appearances for Palace, before leaving as part of cost-cutting measures induced by Goldberg's ill-fated tenure as chairman coming to an insalubrious end.

=== Later career ===
During the summer of 1999, he joined MLS side MetroStars. Ćurčić has been known to sport a shaved head and a fu manchu beard sans mustache. Upon his arrival to Major League Soccer in summer 1999, with the season already in progress, he declared his intention to become the "Dennis Rodman of MLS". Ćurčić's stint in the league, however, lasted only until the end of the season (nine matches in total). The team had a disastrous season, at one point losing seven matches in a row, and 13 out of 14. Coached by compatriot Bora Milutinović, 27-year-old Ćurčić had some decent outings creating from midfield and even scoring two goals, but nothing could save the season that turned out to be the worst recorded by any club in MLS history.

By January 2000, it was clear that Ćurčić, who had already returned to Europe looking for a club, would not be back for the second MLS season. The MetroStars team officially cited a desire to get a goalscorer and not keep a midfield playmaker like Ćurčić, while unofficially reasons for his premature departure ranged from lack of performance to unspecified personal problems.

On 16 March 2000, Ćurčić joined Motherwell. He only made five appearances for the club. In an interview on Sky Sports in April 2001, Ćurčić who had just turned 29 years of age stated that he had retired from football.

== International career ==
Ćurčić's international football career that spanned seven years during the 1990s, started and ended with away friendlies versus Brazil. Ivica Osim gave the 19-year-old his debut in late October 1991 in Varginha vs Brazil when the country was still called SFR Yugoslavia. He came on as the 46th minute substitute for Siniša Mihajlović. His final international was for the Serbia and Montenegro team in September 1998.

== Coaching career ==
As of June 2018, Ćurčić ran a football academy in West London prior to a short period as a coach with the Palace for Life Foundation.

In November 2021 Ćurčić became manager of Serbian League Belgrade club Borac Lazarevac but resigned in April 2022.

== Personal life ==
On 5 May 2007, Ćurčić entered the Serbian Celebrity Big Brother house and won the contest on 3 June 2007 winning €50,000. The reality show win led to resurgence of popularity for him in Serbia, and he appeared in a series of TV commercials for Mobile Telephony of Serbia as well as on various talk and singing shows such as Oralno doba, Zvezde Granda, etc. On 2 August 2008, more than seven years after he stopped playing, Ćurčić played the first of his two testimonial matches. This, the first part of his official farewell to football, pitted Partizan 1994 team consisting of former FK Partizan players from the late 1980s and early 1990s such as Zoran Mirković, Predrag Spasić, Dragan Ćirić, Dejan Čurović, etc. against FK Pionir from Besni Fok, one of the teams where Ćurčić played youth football and also a team where he coached the youth squad. Ćurčić played one half for each of the teams. Partizan 1994 won 2–0. The match was played at a ground in Besni Fok.

On 20 September 2009, Ćurčić started appearing on another reality contest – this time it was Farma, locally franchised version of the Swedish series The Farm. He left the programme on his own initiative within weeks.

It was rumoured that Ćurčić had been approached by the UK's Channel 4 to participate in the British Celebrity Big Brother series in 2010, after having appeared and won the Serbian equivalent two years earlier, however nothing came of that.

== Career statistics ==
Club	Season	League	
Club	Season	Apps	Goals
OFK Beograd	1990–91	3	0
OFK Beograd	1991–92	24	2
OFK Beograd	1992–93	32	3
OFK Beograd	Total	59	5
Partizan	1993–94	33	7
Partizan	1994–95	31	5
Partizan	1995–96	10	2
Partizan	Total	74	14
Bolton Wanderers	1995–96	28	4
Aston Villa	1996–97	22	0
Aston Villa	1997–98	7	0
Aston Villa	Total	29	0
Crystal Palace	1997–98	8	1
Crystal Palace	1998–99	15	4
Crystal Palace	Total	23	5
MetroStars	1999	9	2
Motherwell	1999–2000	5	0
Career total		227	30
