= Saša Ilić (footballer, born 1970) =

Macedonian footballer

Personal information
- Date of birth: 5 September 1970 (age 56)
- Place of birth: Skopje, SR Macedonia, SFR Yugoslavia
- Height: 1.93 m (6 ft 4 in)
- Position: Goalkeeper

Youth career
- Vardar

Senior career*
Years	Team	Apps	(Gls)
1988–1990	Vardar	25	(0)
1990–1995	Partizan	6	(0)
1991–1992	→ Spartak Subotica (loan)	15	(0)
1992–1993	→ Borac Banja Luka (loan)	27	(0)
1995–1997	Busan Daewoo Royals	49	(0)
1997–2000	Hamburger SV	0	(0)
2000–2002	Vardar	17	(0)
2002	Dynamo Saint Petersburg	14	(0)
2003–2004	Persepolis	25	(0)
2004–2005	Esteghlal Ahvaz	29	(0)
2005–2007	Pegah	13	(0)
2013	Gorno Lisiče	3	(0)
Total		223	(0)

International career
1997–2005	Macedonia	5	(0)
- * Club domestic league appearances and goals

Saša Ilić (Macedonian: Саша Илиќ; born 5 September 1970) is a Macedonian former footballer who played as a goalkeeper.

== Club career ==
Born in Skopje, Ilić made his senior debut with Vardar in the 1987–88 season. He spent two more seasons with the club, before moving to Partizan in 1990. After failing to receive any playing time in his debut season, Ilić went on loan to Spartak Subotica (1991–92) and Borac Banja Luka (1992–93). He returned to Partizan in the 1993–94 season, as the club won the double.

In early 1995, Ilić moved abroad to South Korean club Busan Daewoo Royals. He later spent three seasons with Hamburger SV from 1997 to 2000, making just two Intertoto Cup appearances.

After his second stint at Vardar, Ilić moved to Iran to play for Pirouzi in the 2003–04 season and Esteghlal Ahvaz in the 2004–05 season. He also spent two and a half seasons with Pegah, helping them win promotion to the Persian Gulf Pro League in 2007.

In late 2013, at the age of 43, Ilić came out of retirement to play for Gorno Lisiče in the Macedonian First Football League.

== International career ==
At international level, Ilić was capped three times for Macedonia, making his debut in a June 1997 World Cup qualifier versus Iceland. He also made two (non-official) appearances at the 2005 Tehran Cup.

== Honours ==
Partizan

- First League of FR Yugoslavia: 1993–94
- FR Yugoslavia Cup: 1993–94
