= Đorđe Tomić =

Serbian footballer (born 1972)

Personal information
- Full name: Đorđe Tomić
- Date of birth: 11 November 1972 (age 53)
- Place of birth: Belgrade, SFR Yugoslavia
- Height: 1.80 m (5 ft 11 in)
- Position: Midfielder

Youth career
- Partizan

Senior career*
Years	Team	Apps	(Gls)
1992–1995	Partizan	24	(2)
1994	→ OFK Beograd (loan)	7	(0)
1995	→ Hajduk Kula (loan)	8	(0)
1995–1996	Guingamp	12	(0)
1996–1998	Atlético Madrid B	38	(3)
1997	Atlético Madrid	3	(0)
1998–2000	Partizan	47	(14)
2000–2002	Oviedo	62	(8)
2004	Incheon United	7	(0)
Total		208	(27)

International career
1999	FR Yugoslavia	1	(0)
- * Club domestic league appearances and goals

Đorđe Tomić (Serbian Cyrillic: Ђорђе Томић; born 11 November 1972) is a Serbian retired footballer who played as a midfielder.

== Club career ==
Tomić made his senior debut for Partizan in the second part of the 1992–93 season, as the club won the championship. He would help the side win the double in the following 1993–94 season, receiving much more playing time.

== International career ==
In February 1999, Tomić made his solo appearance for FR Yugoslavia under manager Milan Živadinović. He came on as a second-half substitute for Jovan Stanković during a Euro 2000 qualifier against Malta, which ended in a 3–0 victory.

== Post-playing career ==
After hanging up his boots, Tomić served as president of Srem Jakovo.

== Honours ==
Partizan

- First League of FR Yugoslavia: 1992–93, 1993–94, 1998–99
- FR Yugoslavia Cup: 1993–94
