= Dejan Čurović =

Serbian footballer (1968–2019)

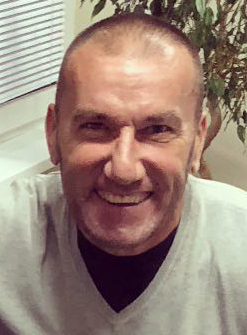
- Čurović in 2018

Personal information
- Full name: Dejan Čurović
- Date of birth: 10 August 1968
- Place of birth: Zemun, SR Serbia, SFR Yugoslavia
- Date of death: 11 August 2019 (aged 51)
- Place of death: Belgrade, Serbia
- Height: 1.85 m (6 ft 1 in)
- Position: Striker

Youth career
- Zemun

Senior career*
Years	Team	Apps	(Gls)
1986–1993	Zemun	106+	(39+)
1993–1994	Partizan	32	(19)
1994–2000	Vitesse	109	(41)
2000–2003	Groningen	42	(7)
Total		289+	(106+)
- * Club domestic league appearances and goals

Dejan Čurović (Serbian Cyrillic: Дејан Чуровић, pronounced [dějan tʃûroʋitɕ]; 10 August 1968 – 11 August 2019) was a Serbian footballer who played as a striker.

A powerful forward, Čurović played with four clubs during his career, namely Zemun and Partizan in the former Yugoslavia, as well as Vitesse and Groningen in the Netherlands. He secured legendary status at Vitesse by scoring the last ever goal at the Nieuw Monnikenhuize and the opening goal at the GelreDome.

== Playing career ==
Čurović started out at his local club Zemun. He was a member of the team that won the Yugoslav Second League in 1990. In his debut season in the Yugoslav First League, Čurović scored 11 goals in 27 appearances, as the club finished in 13th place.

In the summer of 1993, Čurović was transferred to Partizan. He quickly formed a prolific striking partnership with Savo Milošević and finished the 1993–94 season as the team's second-highest scorer with 27 goals, helping the Crno-beli win the double.

After a successful year at Partizan, Čurović moved abroad and signed with Dutch club Vitesse. He spent six seasons in Arnhem, scoring 47 goals across all competitions. In the summer of 2000, Čurović switched to fellow Eredivisie side Groningen. He spent three years at the club, before retiring from the game.

== Post-playing career ==
In June 2011, Čurović was appointed as sporting director of Serbian First League club Inđija.

== Death ==
Čurović died from leukemia on 11 August 2019, one day after his 51st birthday.

== Career statistics ==
Club	Season	League	
Club	Season	Apps	Goals
Zemun	1989–90	19	3
Zemun	1990–91	27	11
Zemun	1991–92	31	12
Zemun	1992–93	29	13
Zemun	Total	106	39
Partizan	1993–94	32	19
Vitesse	1994–95	11	4
Vitesse	1995–96	28	8
Vitesse	1996–97	22	6
Vitesse	1997–98	27	17
Vitesse	1998–99	11	5
Vitesse	1999–2000	10	1
Vitesse	Total	109	41
Groningen	2000–01	24	5
Groningen	2001–02	13	2
Groningen	2002–03	5	0
Groningen	Total	42	7
Career total		289	106

== Honours ==
Zemun

- Yugoslav Second League: 1989–90

Partizan

- First League of FR Yugoslavia: 1993–94
- FR Yugoslavia Cup: 1993–94
