= Albert Nađ =

Serbian footballer

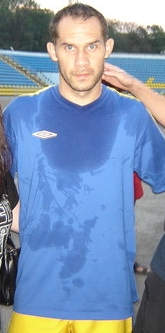
- Nađ with Rostov in 2007

Personal information
- Full name: Albert Nađ
- Date of birth: 29 October 1974 (age 52)
- Place of birth: Zemun, SR Serbia, SFR Yugoslavia
- Height: 1.74 m (5 ft 9 in)
- Position: Defensive midfielder

Team information
- Current team: Dubočica (head coach)

Youth career
- Teleoptik
- 1987–1992: Partizan

Senior career*
Years	Team	Apps	(Gls)
1992–1996	Partizan	111	(8)
1996–1998	Betis	55	(1)
1998–2002	Oviedo	70	(1)
2001	→ Elche (loan)	16	(1)
2002–2007	Partizan	91	(5)
2007	Rostov	7	(0)
2008–2009	Čukarički	33	(1)
Total		383	(17)

International career
1994–2006	Serbia and Montenegro	45	(3)

Managerial career
- 2017–2019: Rakovica
- 2019: Partizan (assistant)
- 2019–2022: Teleoptik
- 2022–2024: Partizan (assistant)
- 2024: Partizan
- 2026: FAP
- 2026–: Dubočica
- * Club domestic league appearances and goals

Albert Nađ (Serbian Cyrillic: Алберт Нађ, pronounced [ǎlbert nâdʑ], Hungarian: Nagy Albert; born 29 October 1974) is a Serbian professional football manager and a former player who played as a defensive midfielder. At international level, Nađ represented Serbia and Montenegro at UEFA Euro 2000 (as FR Yugoslavia) and the 2006 FIFA World Cup and earned a total of 45 caps, scoring 3 goals.

== Club career ==
Nađ was born in Zemun to a Hungarian father and a Serbian mother. He started out at his local club Teleoptik. He later joined the youth system of Partizan, making his senior debut in the title-winning 1992–93 campaign. Subsequently, Nađ was one of the team's most regular players in the 1993–94 season, as they won the double. He spent another two years in the country, collecting one more domestic league title in 1996, while captaining the side. In total, Nađ made 111 league appearances and scored eight goals for Partizan under manager Ljubiša Tumbaković between 1992 and 1996.

In July 1996, Nađ moved abroad to Spain and signed with Betis. He made 30 league appearances in his debut season in La Liga, as the club finished in fourth place. Nađ stayed at Betis for one more season, before moving on loan to Oviedo in the summer of 1998. He was eventually acquired by Oviedo in July 1999. However, Nađ made only 16 appearances in the 1999–2000 season. He was later loaned to Segunda División club Elche until the end of the 2000–01 campaign. After returning from loan, Nađ spent another season with Oviedo, before leaving the club due to unpaid wages in August 2002.

In September 2002, Nađ officially returned to his parent club Partizan, penning a one-year deal. He won the national league in his comeback season. In early 2004, Nađ signed an 18-month extension to his contract with the club. He was also a member of the squad that won the title with an unbeaten record in 2005. Shortly after, Nađ signed a three-year extension to his contract with Partizan. He eventually left the club by mutual agreement in July 2007.

In August 2007, Nađ went abroad again and joined Russian side Rostov, together with Ivica Kralj. They failed to help the club avoid relegation from the Premier League, finishing bottom of the table. Eventually, Nađ left Rostov in December 2007, alongside Kralj and some other players.

In January 2008, Nađ signed a two-and-a-half-year contract with Čukarički. He played his last career match for Čukarički in the final league fixture of the 2008–09 season, against his parent club Partizan on 30 May 2009. After being cheered by the Grobari in the 68th minute, Nađ responded by lifting his Čukarički jersey to reveal Partizan's jersey underneath. He was substituted in the 76 minute, eventually ending his active playing career.

== International career ==
Nađ made his international debut for FR Yugoslavia in a 0–2 loss to Brazil on 23 December 1994. He scored his first national team goal in his second game, a 3–1 win over Hong Kong on 31 January 1995. After missing out on the 1998 FIFA World Cup, Nađ was named by Vujadin Boškov in the country's final UEFA Euro 2000 squad. He made two appearances in the group stage of the tournament, as they were eventually eliminated in the quarter-finals.

Almost four years later, Nađ made a comeback to the national team, playing the full 90 minutes in a 1–1 friendly draw against Northern Ireland on 28 April 2004. He was also selected by Ilija Petković to represent Serbia and Montenegro at the 2006 FIFA World Cup. Subsequently, Nađ made two appearances in Group C, including his last game for the national team on 21 June 2006. He came off the bench early into the match and received two yellow cards by the end of the first half of an eventual 2–3 loss to Ivory Coast.

== Post-playing career ==
In December 2009, Nađ was named as the sports coordinator at his parent club Partizan. He was also responsible for the club's transfer windows between 2010 and 2012. In May 2013, Nađ was officially appointed as sporting director of Partizan. He left the position at the end of his contract in May 2014.

In early 2017, Nađ became sporting director of Serbian League Belgrade side Rakovica while simultaneously taking over the managerial role at the club.

In August 2019, Nađ returned to Partizan and joined Savo Milošević's staff as an assistant. He performed the role for less than three months, before replacing Žarko Lazetić as manager of their affiliated club Teleoptik.

In August 2022, he once again became the assistant coach of FK Partizan as Gordan Petrić became head coach. He remained in this position until 29 April 2024 when, with five matches left before the end of the 2023–24 season, he was appointed as head coach of Partizan, replacing the outgoing Igor Duljaj. He was sacked on 7 June 2024.

He was appointed manager of FAP in March 2026.

== Career statistics ==
=== Club ===
Appearances and goals by club, season and competition
Club	Season	League		Cup		Continental		Total	
Club	Season	Apps	Goals	Apps	Goals	Apps	Goals	Apps	Goals
Partizan	1992–93	25	1	3	0	—		28	1
Partizan	1993–94	30	2	9	2	—		39	4
Partizan	1994–95	30	3	4	1	—		34	4
Partizan	1995–96	26	2	8	0	—		34	2
Partizan	Total	111	8	24	3	—		135	11
Betis	1996–97	30	0	6	0	—		36	0
Betis	1997–98	25	1	3	0	3	0	31	1
Betis	Total	55	1	9	0	3	0	67	1
Oviedo (loan)	1998–99	27	1	2	0	—		29	1
Oviedo	1999–2000	16	0	0	0	—		16	0
Oviedo	2000–01	3	0	0	0	—		3	0
Oviedo	2001–02	24	0	0	0	—		24	0
Oviedo	Total	43	0	0	0	—		43	0
Elche (loan)	2000–01	16	1	0	0	—		16	1
Partizan	2002–03	10	0	1	0	0	0	11	0
Partizan	2003–04	24	0	3	0	8	0	35	0
Partizan	2004–05	20	2	2	0	8	0	30	2
Partizan	2005–06	28	2	0	0	6	0	34	2
Partizan	2006–07	9	1	3	0	1	0	13	1
Partizan	Total	91	5	9	0	23	0	123	5
Rostov	2007	7	0	0	0	—		7	0
Čukarički	2007–08	9	0	1	0	—		10	0
Čukarički	2008–09	24	1	0	0	—		24	1
Čukarički	Total	33	1	1	0	—		34	1
Career total		383	17	45	3	26	0	454	20

=== International ===
Appearances and goals by national team and year
National team	Year	Apps	Goals
FR Yugoslavia	1994	1	0
FR Yugoslavia	1995	7	1
FR Yugoslavia	1996	7	0
FR Yugoslavia	1997	6	0
FR Yugoslavia	1998	4	0
FR Yugoslavia	1999	5	2
FR Yugoslavia	2000	5	0
FR Yugoslavia	2001	0	0
FR Yugoslavia	2002	0	0
Serbia and Montenegro	2003	0	0
Serbia and Montenegro	2004	1	0
Serbia and Montenegro	2005	4	0
Serbia and Montenegro	2006	5	0
Total		45	3

== Managerial statistics ==
As of 26 May 2026

Managerial record by team and tenure
Team	From	To	Record				
Team	From	To	G	W	D	L	Win %
Rakovica	1 June 2017	16 August 2019	67	24	14	29	35.82
Teleoptik	1 November 2019	12 August 2022	105	35	36	34	33.33
Partizan	28 April 2024	7 June 2024	6	2	2	2	33.33
FAP	3 March 2026	Present	10	1	4	5	10.00
Career total			188	62	56	70	32.98

== Honours ==
Partizan

- First League of FR Yugoslavia: 1992–93, 1993–94, 1995–96, 2002–03, 2004–05
- FR Yugoslavia Cup: 1993–94

Betis

- Copa del Rey: Runner-up 1996–97
