= Dejan Osmanović =

Serbian footballer

Personal information
- Full name: Dejan Osmanović
- Date of birth: 29 January 1973 (age 53)
- Place of birth: Vranje, SR Serbia, SFR Yugoslavia
- Height: 1.78 m (5 ft 10 in)
- Position: Striker

Youth career
- Dinamo Vranje

Senior career*
Years	Team	Apps	(Gls)
1991–1996	Dinamo Vranje	99	(51)
1996–2001	Hajduk Kula	121	(67)
1999	→ Extremadura (loan)	4	(0)
2001–2002	Vitória	11	(2)
2002	→ Hajduk Kula (loan)	2	(1)
2003–2006	Hajduk Kula	66	(23)
2004	→ Budućnost Banatski Dvor (loan)	12	(5)
2007	Bežanija	16	(5)
2007	Smederevo	13	(2)
2008	Banat Zrenjanin	18	(3)
2009–2010	Dinamo Vranje	53	(15)
2011	Bežanija	4	(0)
2011	Dinamo Vranje	3	(1)
2012	Radan Lebane		
2013	Dinamo Vranje		
2014	Roma Vranje	1	(0)
2021	Radnički Vranje	1	(2)
Total		424	(177)

Managerial career
- 2021–: Radnički Vranje
- * Club domestic league appearances and goals

Dejan Osmanović (Serbian Cyrillic: Дејан Османовић; born 29 January 1973) is a Serbian former footballer of Romani descent.

One of the most prolific strikers in FR Yugoslavia during the late 1990s and early 2000s, Osmanović is the third-highest scorer in the top flight of his country (including Serbia and its predecessors) with 101 goals (behind only Saša Ilić and Nenad Mirosavljević). He is best remembered for his time at Hajduk Kula, becoming the club's all-time top scorer.

== Club career ==
After starting at his hometown club Dinamo Vranje, Osmanović was transferred to Hajduk Kula in the summer of 1996. He helped the side to a fourth-place finish in his debut season, as they qualified for the 1997 UEFA Intertoto Cup. With 16 goals, Osmanović would become the First League of FR Yugoslavia top scorer in the NATO bombing-suspended 1998–99 season.

In August 1999, after scoring in Hajduk's opening round of the new campaign, Osmanović moved abroad to Spain and signed with Segunda División club Extremadura. He, however, failed to make an impact with the team, appearing in just four league matches, before leaving in December. Upon his return to Kula, Osmanović scored 25 times in 24 fixtures (1.04 goals per game) during the 2000–01 season, but finished second in the league behind Petar Divić with 27 goals.

In July 2001, Osmanović moved abroad for the second time to play for Brazilian club Vitória. He scored two goals until the end of the year. In early 2002, Osmanović was loaned to his former club Hajduk Kula until the end of the season, before returning to Brazil.

In December 2002, it was reported that Osmanović would be rejoining Hajduk Kula for the third time. He scored five goals in 22 appearances during the 2003–04 season. In the summer of 2004, Osmanović was loaned to Second League club Budućnost Banatski Dvor ahead of their UEFA Cup campaign.

In August 2007, shortly after leaving Bežanija, Osmanović was signed by fellow Serbian SuperLiga side Smederevo. He scored his 100th goal in the top flight while playing for Banat Zrenjanin in 2008. In February 2009, Osmanović returned to his parent club Dinamo Vranje.

== International career ==
In January 2001, Osmanović represented FR Yugoslavia at the Millennium Super Soccer Cup, as the team won the tournament. He made three (non-official) appearances in the process.

== Career statistics ==
Appearances and goals by club, season and competition
Club	Season	League			Cup		Continental		Total	
Club	Season	Division	Apps	Goals	Apps	Goals	Apps	Goals	Apps	Goals
Hajduk Kula	1996–97	First League of FR Yugoslavia	31	4			—		31	4
Hajduk Kula	1997–98	First League of FR Yugoslavia	28	11			4	1	32	12
Hajduk Kula	1998–99	First League of FR Yugoslavia	21	16			—		21	16
Hajduk Kula	1999–2000	First League of FR Yugoslavia	17	11	0	0	—		17	11
Hajduk Kula	2000–01	First League of FR Yugoslavia	24	25	2	0	—		26	25
Hajduk Kula	2001–02	First League of FR Yugoslavia	2	1	0	0	—		2	1
Hajduk Kula	2002–03	First League of Serbia and Montenegro	1	0	0	0	—		1	0
Hajduk Kula	2003–04	First League of Serbia and Montenegro	22	5	1	0	—		23	5
Hajduk Kula	2004–05	First League of Serbia and Montenegro	13	7	0	0	—		13	7
Hajduk Kula	2005–06	First League of Serbia and Montenegro	25	11			—		25	11
Hajduk Kula	2006–07	Serbian SuperLiga	5	0			1	0	6	0
Hajduk Kula	Total		189	91	3	0	5	1	197	92
Bežanija	2006–07	Serbian SuperLiga	15	5			—		15	5
Bežanija	2007–08	Serbian SuperLiga	1	0	0	0	2	0	3	0
Bežanija	Total		16	5	0	0	2	0	18	5
Smederevo	2007–08	Serbian SuperLiga	13	2	2	1	—		15	3
Banat Zrenjanin	2007–08	Serbian SuperLiga	9	2	1	0	—		10	2
Banat Zrenjanin	2008–09	Serbian SuperLiga	9	1			—		9	1
Banat Zrenjanin	Total		18	3	1	0	—		19	3
Career total			236	101	6	1	7	1	249	103

== Honours ==
- First League of FR Yugoslavia Top Scorer: 1998–99
