= Miroslav Čermelj =

Serbian footballer

Personal information
- Full name: Miroslav Čermelj
- Date of birth: 27 December 1972 (age 53)
- Place of birth: Belgrade, SFR Yugoslavia
- Height: 1.84 m (6 ft 0 in)
- Position: Defender

Youth career
- Red Star Belgrade

Senior career*
Years	Team	Apps	(Gls)
1992–1993	Obilić		
1994–1995	Partizan	20	(0)
1995–1997	OFK Beograd	39	(4)
1997–1998	Pumas UNAM	14	(1)
1998–2000	Extremadura	0	(0)
2001	Beijing Guoan		
2002	Čukarički	10	(0)
2002	Rudar Pljevlja	6	(0)
Total		89	(5)

Managerial career
- Brodarac 1947
- * Club domestic league appearances and goals

Miroslav Čermelj (Serbian Cyrillic: Мирослав Чермељ; born 27 December 1972) is a Serbian former professional footballer who played as a defender.

== Career ==
Čermelj came through the youth system of Red Star Belgrade, before making his senior debut at Obilić. He later switched to Partizan, becoming a member of the team that won the double in the 1993–94 season. Prior to moving abroad, Čermelj also spent two seasons with OFK Beograd.

In the summer of 1997, Čermelj moved to Mexico and signed with UNAM. He returned to Europe and joined La Liga club Extremadura in 1998. After failing to make an impact in Spain, Čermelj went to Asia and played for Beijing Guoan in the Chinese Jia-A League.

== Honours ==
Partizan

- First League of FR Yugoslavia: 1993–94
- FR Yugoslavia Cup: 1993–94
