= Đorđe Svetličić =

Serbian footballer

Personal information
- Full name: Đorđe Svetličić
- Date of birth: 5 January 1974 (age 52)
- Place of birth: Belgrade, SFR Yugoslavia
- Height: 1.89 m (6 ft 2 in)
- Position: Defender

Youth career
- Grafičar Beograd

Senior career*
Years	Team	Apps	(Gls)
1993–1999	Partizan	100	(4)
1999–2003	Germinal Beerschot	89	(1)
2003–2006	Cercle Brugge	76	(0)
2006–2008	Gent	49	(1)
2008–2009	Germinal Beerschot	9	(1)
Total		323	(7)

International career
1997–1998	FR Yugoslavia	2	(0)
- * Club domestic league appearances and goals

Đorđe Svetličić (Serbian Cyrillic: Ђорђе Светличић; born 5 January 1974) is a Serbian former footballer who played as a defender.

== Club career ==
After starting out at Grafičar Beograd, Svetličić joined Partizan in 1993. He spent six seasons with the Crno-beli, helping them win four national championships and two national cups. In 1999, Svetličić moved abroad to Belgium and signed with Germinal Beerschot. He would also play for Cercle Brugge (2003–2006) and Gent (2006–2008), before returning to Germinal Beerschot.

== International career ==
Svetličić made his international debut for FR Yugoslavia in a friendly against Russia (1–0 win) on 20 August 1997. He played his second and last match for the national team in a friendly against Argentina (3–1 loss) on 25 February 1998.

== Honours ==
Partizan

- First League of FR Yugoslavia: 1993–94, 1995–96, 1996–97, 1998–99
- FR Yugoslavia Cup: 1993–94, 1997–98
