= 1998–99 First League of FR Yugoslavia =

First League of FR Yugoslavia
- Season: 1998–99
- Champions: Partizan; 16th domestic title
- Relegated: none
- Champions League: Partizan
- UEFA Cup: Red Star; Vojvodina
- Matches: 216
- Goals: 616 (2.85 per match)
- Top goalscorer: Dejan Osmanović (16)

The 1998–99 First League of FR Yugoslavia was the seventh season of the FR Yugoslavia's top-level football league since its establishment. It was contested by 18 teams (15 from Serbia, one from Kosovo and two from Montenegro), and Partizan won the championship (declared on 12 June 1999).

The championship was stopped on 14 May 1999, because of the NATO bombing of Yugoslavia, after 24 rounds.

== Teams ==
Location of teams in the 1998–99 First League

Club	City	Stadium	Capacity
Partizan	Belgrade	Partizan Stadium	32,710
Red Star	Belgrade	Red Star Stadium	55,538
Vojvodina	Novi Sad	Karađorđe Stadium	17,204
Zemun	Zemun, Belgrade	Zemun Stadium	10,000
Rad	Belgrade	Stadion Kralj Petar I	6,000
Proleter	Zrenjanin	Stadion Karađorđev park	13,500
Hajduk Kula	Kula	Stadion Hajduk	6,000
Obilić	Belgrade	FK Obilić Stadium	4,500
Železnik	Belgrade	Železnik Stadium	8,000
Mogren	Budva	Stadion Lugovi	4,000
OFK Beograd	Karaburma, Belgrade	Omladinski Stadium	20,000
Sartid 1913	Smederevo	Smederevo City Stadium	17,200
Spartak	Subotica	Subotica City Stadium	13,000
Radnički	Kragujevac	Čika Dača Stadium	15,000
Priština	Priština	Priština City Stadium	25,000
Budućnost Podgorica	Podgorica	Podgorica City Stadium	12,000
Radnički Niš	Niš	Čair Stadium	18,000
Milicionar	Belgrade	SC MUP Makiš	4,000

== League table ==
Pos	Team	Pld	W	D	L	GF	GA	GD	Pts	Qualification or relegation
1	Partizan (C)	24	21	3	0	59	11	+48	66	Qualification for Champions League first qualifying round
2	Obilić	24	20	4	0	61	9	+52	64	Excluded from European competitions (Note: Obilić was excluded from the UEFA competitions as its owner, Željko "Arkan" Ražnatović, was charged with war crimes. Vojvodina were awarded Obilić's European berth.)
3	Red Star Belgrade	24	15	6	3	54	18	+36	51	Qualification for UEFA Cup qualifying round
4	Vojvodina	24	13	3	8	45	22	+23	42	Qualification for UEFA Cup qualifying round
5	Rad	24	11	7	6	26	26	0	40	
6	Proleter Zrenjanin	24	10	5	9	29	29	0	35	
7	Hajduk Kula	24	9	5	10	27	28	−1	32	
8	OFK Beograd	24	8	7	9	35	39	−4	31	
9	Sartid	24	7	9	8	24	27	−3	30	
10	Radnički Kragujevac	24	9	3	12	33	43	−10	30	
11	Milicionar	24	8	5	11	39	39	0	29	
12	Zemun	24	9	1	14	30	47	−17	28	
13	Železnik	24	7	5	12	29	43	−14	26	
14	Budućnost Podgorica	24	7	5	12	28	42	−14	26	
15	Mogren	24	4	8	12	18	42	−24	20	
16	Radnički Niš	24	4	7	13	21	44	−23	19	
17	Priština	24	5	3	16	25	49	−24	18	
18	Spartak Subotica	24	6	0	18	33	58	−25	18	

Updated to match(es) played on unknown. Source: RSSSF.org
Rules for classification: 1) points; 2) goal difference; 3) number of goals scored.
(C) Champions

== Results ==
Home \ Away	BUD	HAJ	MIL	MOG	OBI	OFK	PAR	PRI	PRO	RAD	RDK	RNI	RSB	SAR	SPA	VOJ	ZEM	ŽEL
Budućnost Podgorica				4–1	1–2	2–2		0–0			2–1	3–1	0–1	0–0	2–0	1–0	1–0	2–0
Hajduk Kula	3–0		0–0	1–0		0–0		2–0	2–0		3–0	2–0		3–3	2–0		3–0	1–0
Milicionar	6–3			1–1	0–0	4–0	0–1	2–0		5–0		4–5	1–7		2–1	2–1		3–0
Mogren		2–2	1–0		0–0		0–3		1–2	0–2	1–0	0–0		1–1		0–0	1–0	2–2
Obilić	5–0	5–0	2–0			2–0		3–0	2–0		4–0	5–0		4–2	3–1		6–3	2–0
OFK Beograd	5–3	1–0	2–2	1–2	0–1		2–3	3–2		1–1		2–0	1–1			0–0		5–2
Partizan	1–0	3–0		3–1	0–0			3–0		4–0	2–0	4–1	2–1		5–1	2–0		4–1
Priština		3–1	3–2	6–1	0–2	1–3	0–4		1–1	1–2		1–1	0–1			2–1		3–1
Proleter Zrenjanin	1–1		0–1	2–2		1–0	0–1	2–0			3–0		2–1	1–0	3–1		2–1	2–2
Rad	2–1	1–0		1–0	0–2				1–1		2–1	2–0	1–1	1–1	1–0	1–0		2–0
Radnički Kragujevac		1–0	1–0			6–1	1–2	2–0	2–0	1–1			1–1	2–0	3–2	2–3	0–2	
Radnički Niš	1–0	1–1	4–1		0–2	0–0	0–0	3–1	1–2		2–2			0–0	0–2		0–1	
Red Star	4–0	2–0		3–0	1–1		2–2		2–1	3–1		4–0		0–1		1–0	5–1	4–0
Sartid	0–0		1–0			0–1	0–2	3–0	2–1	1–0	1–3		1–1		2–1	0–3	3–0	
Spartak Subotica		2–0	4–2	3–1	0–4	3–4	0–4	3–1	0–1	1–3			1–3			1–3	3–2	
Vojvodina	2–0	3–1		3–0	0–1				4–1	1–1	8–1	1–0	1–2	1–0			5–1	3–2
Zemun	3–2		1–0	2–0		1–0	1–2	3–0		1–0	1–3		0–3	1–1	4–2	0–2		
Železnik		1–0	1–1		1–1	2–1	0–2		1–0	0–0	2–0	4–1		1–1	3–1		3–1	

Source: RSSSF.org
Legend: Blue = home team win; Yellow = draw; Red = away team win.

== Winning squad ==
Champions: Partizan Belgrade (Coach: Ljubiša Tumbaković)

Players (league matches/league goals)

- (Republika Srpska) Nikola Damjanac
- (Federal Republic of Yugoslavia) Vuk Rašović
- (Federal Republic of Yugoslavia) Branko Savić
- (Federal Republic of Yugoslavia) Igor Duljaj
- (Federal Republic of Yugoslavia) Zoltan Sabo
- (North Macedonia) Marjan Gerasimovski
- (Federal Republic of Yugoslavia) Darko Tešović
- (Federal Republic of Yugoslavia) Goran Trobok
- (North Macedonia) Milan Stojanoski
- (Federal Republic of Yugoslavia) Nenad Bjeković
- (Federal Republic of Yugoslavia) Dragan Stojisavljević
- (Federal Republic of Yugoslavia) Darko Ljubanović
- (Federal Republic of Yugoslavia) Đorđe Svetličić
- (Federal Republic of Yugoslavia) Mateja Kežman
- (Federal Republic of Yugoslavia) Radiša Ilić (goalkeeper)
- (Federal Republic of Yugoslavia) Goran Obradović
- (Federal Republic of Yugoslavia) Ivica Iliev
- (Federal Republic of Yugoslavia) Vladimir Ivić
- (Federal Republic of Yugoslavia) Goran Arnaut
- (Federal Republic of Yugoslavia) Mladen Krstajić
- (Federal Republic of Yugoslavia) Dragan Čalija
- (Federal Republic of Yugoslavia) Saša Ilić
- (Federal Republic of Yugoslavia) Ljubiša Ranković
- (Bulgaria) Predrag Pažin
- (Federal Republic of Yugoslavia) Dragoljub Jeremić
- (Federal Republic of Yugoslavia) Đorđe Tomić
- (Federal Republic of Yugoslavia) Aleksandar Vuković
- (Federal Republic of Yugoslavia) Srđan Baljak
- (Federal Republic of Yugoslavia) Dejan Živković

== Top goalscorers ==
Rank	Player	Club	Goals
1	(Federal Republic of Yugoslavia) Dejan Osmanović	Hajduk Kula	16
2	(Federal Republic of Yugoslavia) Mihajlo Pjanović	Red Star	14
3	(Federal Republic of Yugoslavia) Zoran Ranković	Obilić	13
3	(Federal Republic of Yugoslavia) Saša Ilić	Partizan	13
5	(Federal Republic of Yugoslavia) Antal Puhalak	Spartak	12
5	(Federal Republic of Yugoslavia) Vladimir Ivić	Partizan	12
