= Dragan Ćirić =

Serbian footballer

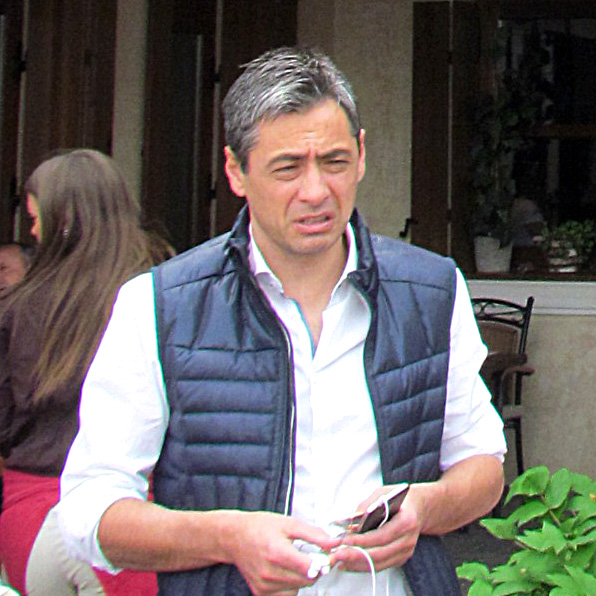
- Ćirić in 2015

Personal information
- Full name: Dragan Ćirić
- Date of birth: 15 September 1974 (age 52)
- Place of birth: Belgrade, SFR Yugoslavia
- Height: 1.80 m (5 ft 11 in)
- Position: Attacking midfielder

Youth career
- Srem Jakovo
- Partizan

Senior career*
Years	Team	Apps	(Gls)
1992–1997	Partizan	143	(42)
1997–2000	Barcelona	26	(0)
1999–2000	→ AEK Athens (loan)	26	(10)
2000–2004	Valladolid	51	(4)
2004–2005	Partizan	13	(3)
Total		259	(59)

International career
1995–1997	FR Yugoslavia	4	(0)
- * Club domestic league appearances and goals

Dragan Ćirić (Serbian Cyrillic: Драган Ћирић; born 15 September 1974) is a Serbian retired professional footballer who played as an attacking midfielder for Partizan, Barcelona, AEK Athens, and Real Valladolid. Internationally, he played for the Yugoslavia national team, earning 4 caps.

== Club career ==
=== Early career ===
After starting out at local club Srem Jakovo, Belgrade-born Ćirić finished his development at Partizan, sharing teams with the likes of Savo Milošević and Albert Nađ. This trio was promoted to the senior squad in 1992–93, as they won the league in that and the following seasons under manager Ljubiša Tumbaković. Ćirić conquered a further two national championships during his first spell and was the team's captain in the 1996–97 season.

=== Barcelona ===
In July 1997, Ćirić signed a four-year contract with Barcelona. Over the course of his career at Barcelona, he played 35 games across all competitions in his debut season. In addition into featuring in Barcelona's 1997–98 UEFA Champions League campaign, he also contributed to the team's treble conquest of La Liga, Copa del Rey and the UEFA Super Cup. The manager Louis van Gaal employed Ćirić primarily as a right-winger, although it was not his preferred position. As the season progressed, he was losing his spot in the lineup.

Thus on 25 June 1999 he was loaned to Greek side AEK Athens for a fee of 300 million drachmas and a buy-out option. In Greece he scored in double digits and also winning the domestic Cup. Upon his return to the Camp Nou, he was sold to fellow Spaniards Real Valladolid in July 2000.

=== Return to Partizan ===
In June 2004, Ćirić returned to Partizan, signing a three-year contract. Under coach Vladimir Vermezović, he helped the club win the national league in his comeback season with an unbeaten record. He also played in Partizan's historic 2004–05 UEFA Cup campaign, up to their elimination in the final 16 by CSKA Moscow. After that season, he retired shortly after at the age of 31.

== International career ==
Ćirić was capped four times for Serbia and Montenegro. He made his debut in a 4–1 friendly win against El Salvador on 12 November 1995, coming on as a substitute for Dejan Petković.

== Administrative career ==
In December 2014, Ćirić was named director of football at Partizan. He left the position less than two months later, citing dissatisfaction with the state of Serbian football as the main reason for his decision.

== Career statistics ==
=== International ===
National team	Year	Apps	Goals
Yugoslavia	1995	2	0
Yugoslavia	1996	0	0
Yugoslavia	1997	2	0
Total		4	0

== Honours ==
Partizan

- First League of FR Yugoslavia: 1992–93, 1993–94, 1995–96, 1996–97, 2004–05
- FR Yugoslavia Cup: 1993–94

Barcelona

- La Liga: 1997–98, 1998–99
- Copa del Rey: 1997–98
- UEFA Super Cup: 1997

AEK Athens

- Greek Cup: 1999–2000
