= 1989–90 Yugoslav Second League =

Yugoslav Second League
- Season: 1989–90
- Champions: Zemun
- Promoted: Zemun; Proleter Zrenjanin
- Relegated: Rudar Ljubija; Liria; Čelik; Mladost Lučani

The 1989–90 Yugoslav Second League season was the 44th season of the Second Federal League (Serbo-Croatian: Druga savezna liga), the second level association football competition of SFR Yugoslavia, since its establishment in 1946.

== Teams ==
A total of twenty teams contested the league, including fourteen sides from the 1988–89 season, two clubs relegated from the 1988–89 Yugoslav First League and four sides promoted from the Inter-Republic Leagues played in the 1988–89 season. The league was contested in a double round robin format, with each club playing every other club twice, for a total of 38 rounds. Two points were awarded for a win, while in case of a draw - penalty kicks were taken and the winner of the shootout was awarded one point while the loser got nothing.

Čelik and Napredak Kruševac were relegated from the 1988–89 Yugoslav First League after finishing in the bottom two places of the league table. The four clubs promoted to the second level were Iskra, Mladost Lučani, Rudar Ljubija and Zemun.

Locations of teams' home cities in the 1989–90 Yugoslav Second League

Team	Location	Federal subject	Position in 1987–88
OFK Belgrade	Belgrade	SR Serbia	6th
Borac Čačak	Čačak	SR Serbia	7th
Čelik	Zenica	SR Bosnia and Herzegovina	—
Dinamo Vinkovci	Vinkovci	SR Croatia	14th
GOŠK-Jug	Dubrovnik	SR Croatia	16th
Iskra	Bugojno	SR Bosnia and Herzegovina	—
Kikinda	Kikinda	(Socialist Republic of Serbia) SAP Vojvodina	4th
Leotar	Trebinje	SR Bosnia and Herzegovina	15th
Liria	Prizren	(Socialist Republic of Serbia) SAP Kosovo	9th
Mačva Šabac	Šabac	SR Serbia	11th
Mladost Lučani	Lučani	SR Serbia	—
Napredak Kruševac	Kruševac	SR Serbia	—
Pelister	Bitola	SR Macedonia	12th
Prishtina	Pristina	(Socialist Republic of Serbia) SAP Kosovo	10th
Proleter Zrenjanin	Zrenjanin	(Socialist Republic of Serbia) SAP Vojvodina	3rd
Rudar Ljubija	Prijedor	SR Bosnia and Herzegovina	—
Sloboda Titovo Užice	Titovo Užice	SR Serbia	13th
Sutjeska	Nikšić	SR Montenegro	8th
Šibenik	Šibenik	SR Croatia	5th
Zemun	Zemun	SR Serbia	—

== League table ==
Pos	Team	Pld	W	PKW	PKL	L	GF	GA	GD	Pts	Promotion or relegation
1	Zemun (C, P)	38	23	5	1	9	59	35	+24	51	Promotion to Yugoslav First League
2	Proleter Zrenjanin (P)	38	23	4	2	9	55	30	+25	50	Promotion to Yugoslav First League
3	Sutjeska Nikšić	38	21	1	3	13	70	34	+36	43	
4	Prishtina	38	21	1	3	13	61	39	+22	43	
5	Šibenik	38	19	3	2	14	56	55	+1	41	
6	Sloboda Titovo Užice	38	19	1	4	14	44	35	+9	39	
7	Kikinda	38	16	6	0	16	47	51	−4	38	
8	Dinamo Vinkovci	38	17	3	6	12	51	36	+15	37	
9	Pelister	38	16	4	1	17	54	50	+4	36	
10	GOŠK-Jug	38	15	6	3	14	39	39	0	36	
11	Leotar	38	16	3	3	16	47	46	+1	35	
12	Mačva Šabac	38	15	4	3	16	49	44	+5	34	
13	Iskra	38	17	0	4	17	45	57	−12	34	
14	Napredak Kruševac	38	15	4	1	18	41	54	−13	34	
15	OFK Belgrade	38	15	3	4	16	58	49	+9	33	
16	Borac Čačak	38	13	7	6	12	34	35	−1	33	
17	Rudar Ljubija (R)	38	16	0	2	20	57	56	+1	32	Relegation to Inter-Republic Leagues
18	Liria (R)	38	11	1	2	24	30	55	−25	23	Relegation to Inter-Republic Leagues
19	Čelik (R)	38	9	0	6	23	31	65	−34	18	Relegation to Inter-Republic Leagues
20	Mladost Lučani (Note: Mladost Lučani were docked 6 points due to match fixing in the last round of the previous season) (R)	38	4	3	2	29	22	84	−62	5	Relegation to Inter-Republic Leagues

Source: rsssf.org
Rules for classification: 1) points; 2) goal difference; 3) number of goals scored. If a match ended in a draw, penalties were taken, and only the winner of the penalty shoot-out was rewarded with a point.
(C) Champion; (P) Promoted; (R) Relegated

== See also ==
- 1989–90 Yugoslav First League
- 1989–90 Yugoslav Cup
