= Antal Puhalak =

Serbian footballer

Personal information
- Full name: Antal Puhalak
- Date of birth: 9 June 1963 (age 63)
- Place of birth: Subotica, SR Serbia, SFR Yugoslavia
- Height: 1.75 m (5 ft 9 in)
- Position: Forward

Senior career*
Years	Team	Apps	(Gls)
1985–1990	Spartak Subotica	87	(12)
1990	Celta	9	(0)
1991	Sarajevo	11	(3)
1991–1992	Vojvodina	18	(2)
1993–1994	Spartak Subotica	45	(16)
1994–1995	Kispest-Honvéd	10	(3)
1995	→ Parmalat (loan)	7	(2)
1995–1996	Szegedi VSE		
1995–1996	→ EMDSZ Soproni LC (loan)		
1996	Kiskundorozsma		
1997	Hajduk Kula	14	(5)
1997–2000	Spartak Subotica	63	(29)
Total		264+	(72+)
- * Club domestic league appearances and goals

Antal Puhalak (Serbian Cyrillic: Антал Пухалак; born 9 June 1963) is a Serbian former professional footballer who played as a forward.

== Career ==
Between 1985 and 1990, Puhalak played for Spartak Subotica, helping them win promotion to the Yugoslav First League on two occasions (1986 and 1988).

In the summer of 1990, Puhalak moved abroad to Spain and joined Segunda División club Celta, but quickly returned to Yugoslavia and helped Sarajevo avoid relegation from the top flight.

After a comeback stint at Spartak Subotica, Puhalak moved abroad for the second time, signing with Hungarian club Kispest-Honvéd in the summer of 1994.

In the summer of 1997, Puhalak rejoined Spartak Subotica well into his 30s, going on to score double-digit goals in two consecutive First League of FR Yugoslavia seasons (1997–98 and 1998–99).

== Career statistics ==
Club	Season	League	
Club	Season	Apps	Goals
Spartak Subotica	1985–86	14	1
Spartak Subotica	1986–87	12	0
Spartak Subotica	1987–88		
Spartak Subotica	1988–89	30	2
Spartak Subotica	1989–90	31	9
Spartak Subotica	Total	87	12
Celta	1990–91	9	0
Sarajevo	1990–91	11	3
Vojvodina	1991–92	18	2
Spartak Subotica	1992–93	14	4
Spartak Subotica	1993–94	31	12
Spartak Subotica	Total	45	16
Kispest-Honvéd	1994–95	10	3
Parmalat (loan)	1994–95	7	2
Hajduk Kula	1996–97	14	5
Spartak Subotica	1997–98	29	13
Spartak Subotica	1998–99	21	12
Spartak Subotica	1999–2000	13	4
Spartak Subotica	Total	63	29
Career total		264	72
