= Darko Tešović =

Serbian football manager and player

Personal information
- Full name: Darko Tešović
- Date of birth: 3 August 1970 (age 56)
- Place of birth: Belgrade, SFR Yugoslavia
- Height: 1.82 m (6 ft 0 in)
- Position: Midfielder

Team information
- Current team: Novi Sad 1921 (manager)

Youth career
- Partizan

Senior career*
Years	Team	Apps	(Gls)
1991–1993	Radnički Beograd	51	(4)
1993–1999	Partizan	126	(25)
1999–2002	Ethnikos Asteras	73	(16)
2002–2005	Budućnost Banatski Dvor	49	(7)
Total		299	(52)

Managerial career
- Radnički Beograd (youth)
- 2008–2016: Partizan (youth)
- 2016–2017: Panionios (assistant)
- 2017–2018: Radnički Nova Pazova
- 2018: Radnički Kragujevac
- 2018–2019: Mačva Šabac
- 2019: Novi Pazar
- 2020–2021: Al Ahli (assistant)
- 2021: AEK Athens (assistant)
- 2021–2022: Ettifaq (assistant)
- 2023: Radnički Sremska Mitrovica
- 2024–: Novi Sad 1921
- * Club domestic league appearances and goals

Darko Tešović (Serbian Cyrillic: Дарко Тешовић; born 3 August 1970) is a Serbian football manager and former player.

== Playing career ==
In his native country, Tešović played for Radnički Beograd, Partizan, Teleoptik, and Budućnost Banatski Dvor. He spent six seasons with the Crno-beli in the 1990s, winning four national championships and two national cups. Between 1999 and 2002, Tešović represented Greek club Ethnikos Asteras, recording 73 appearances and scoring 16 goals in the top flight.

== Managerial career ==
After serving as an assistant to Vladan Milojević at Panionios in Greece, Tešović was appointed manager of Serbian League Vojvodina club Radnički Nova Pazova in June 2017. He subsequently took charge at Serbian First League club Radnički Kragujevac in June 2018.

== Honours ==
Partizan

- First League of FR Yugoslavia: 1993–94, 1995–96, 1996–97, 1998–99
- FR Yugoslavia Cup: 1993–94, 1997–98
