= 1993–94 First League of FR Yugoslavia =

First League of FR Yugoslavia
- Season: 1993–94
- Champions: Partizan; 13th domestic title
- Champions League: No team
- UEFA Cup: No team
- Cup Winners' Cup: No team
- Top goalscorer: Savo Milošević (21)

Statistics of First League of FR Yugoslavia (Serbian: Пpвa савезна лига, Prva savezna liga) for the 1993–94 season.

== Overview ==
The league was divided into 2 groups, A and B, consisting each of 10 clubs. Both groups were played in league system. By winter break all clubs in each group meet each other twice, home and away, with the bottom four classified from A group moving to the group B, and being replaced by the top four from the B group. At the end of the season the same situation happened with four teams being replaced from A and B groups, adding the fact that the bottom three clubs from the B group were relegated into the Second League of FR Yugoslavia for the next season and replaced by the top three from that league.

At the end of the season FK Partizan became champions, with their striker Savo Milošević becoming the league's top-scorer with 21 goals.

The relegated clubs were OFK Kikinda, FK Mogren and FK Jastrebac Niš.

== Teams ==
Location of teams in the 1993–94 First League

Club	City	Stadium	Capacity
Partizan	Belgrade	Partizan Stadium	32,710
Red Star	Belgrade	Red Star Stadium	55,538
Vojvodina	Novi Sad	Karađorđe Stadium	17,204
Zemun	Zemun, Belgrade	Zemun Stadium	10,000
Rad	Belgrade	Stadion Kralj Petar I	6,000
Napredak Kruševac	Kruševac	Mladost Stadium	10,000
Radnički Niš	Niš	Čair Stadium	18,000
Hajduk Kula	Kula	Stadion Hajduk	6,000
Proleter	Zrenjanin	Stadion Karađorđev park	13,500
Budućnost Podgorica	Podgorica	Podgorica City Stadium	12,000
OFK Beograd	Karaburma, Belgrade	Omladinski Stadium	20,000
Bečej	Bečej	Stadion kraj Tise	3,000
Mogren	Budva	Stadion Lugovi	4,000
OFK Kikinda	Kikinda	Kikinda City Stadium	6,000
Radnički Beograd	Novi Beograd	Stadion FK Radnički	5,000
Sutjeska	Nikšić	Gradski stadion (Nikšić)	10,800
Spartak	Subotica	Subotica City Stadium	13,000
Jastrebac	Niš	Stadion FK Jastrebac	5,000
Sloboda	Užice	Užice City Stadium	12,000
Rudar Pljevlja	Pljevlja	Stadion pod Golubinjom	10,000

== Autumn ==
=== IA league ===
==== Table ====
Pos	Team	Pld	W	D	L	GF	GA	GD	Pts	Result
1	Partizan	18	11	6	1	37	18	+19	28	
2	Red Star	18	10	5	3	38	16	+22	25	
3	Vojvodina	18	10	4	4	34	18	+16	24	
4	Zemun	18	8	2	8	16	20	−4	18	
5	Proleter Zrenjanin	18	7	4	7	33	26	+7	18	
6	Budućnost Podgorica	18	6	6	6	17	26	−9	18	
7	Rad	18	7	3	8	16	19	−3	17	Transfer to Spring IB league
8	Radnički Niš	18	6	3	9	20	31	−11	15	Transfer to Spring IB league
9	Hajduk Kula	18	3	4	11	17	28	−11	10	Transfer to Spring IB league
10	Napredak Kruševac	18	2	3	13	16	42	−26	7	Transfer to Spring IB league

Rules for classification: 1) points; 2) goal difference; 3) number of goals scored.
Win: 2pts, Draw: 1pt

Bonus point

- 13: Partizan (7 for 1st place, 6 for obtaining 27-29 points)
- 11: Red Star (6 for 2nd place, 5 for obtaining 24-26 points)
- 10: Vojvodina (5 for 3rd place, 5 for obtaining 24-26 points)
- 8: Zemun (5 for 4th place, 3 for obtaining 18-20 points)
- 7: Proleter (4 for 5th place, 3 for obtaining 18-20 points)
- 7: Budućnost (4 for 6th place, 3 for obtaining 18-20 points)

==== Results ====
Home \ Away	BUD	HAJ	NAP	PAR	PRO	RAD	RNI	RSB	VOJ	ZEM
Budućnost Podgorica		2–0	2–0	0–1	2–0	1–1	1–0	2–2	0–0	0–0
Hajduk Kula	0–1		5–0	2–4	1–1	0–1	3–0	0–0	0–1	0–1
Napredak Kruševac	1–1	3–1		1–3	1–1	1–2	0–2	1–2	0–4	1–3
Partizan	3–3	1–1	4–1		1–0	3–2	4–0	0–2	4–2	2–1
Proleter Zrenjanin	6–1	7–0	2–1	1–1		0–0	4–3	2–1	2–3	2–0
Rad	2–0	1–2	0–1	0–2	1–0		0–1	1–0	1–1	2–1
Radnički Niš	3–0	1–1	2–1	1–1	3–1	0–1		1–2	1–5	1–0
Red Star	6–0	1–0	2–2	1–1	3–0	3–1	5–1		2–2	3–0
Vojvodina	0–1	1–0	3–0	0–0	3–4	2–0	2–0	2–1		2–0
Zemun	1–0	2–1	3–1	0–2	1–0	1–0	0–0	0–2	2–1	

Source: EU-Football.info
Legend: Blue = home team win; Yellow = draw; Red = away team win.

=== IB league ===
==== Table ====
Pos	Team	Pld	W	D	L	GF	GA	GD	Pts	Result
1	OFK Beograd	18	10	3	5	27	23	+4	23	Transfer to Spring IA league
2	Spartak Subotica	18	9	3	6	32	18	+14	21	Transfer to Spring IA league
3	Radnički Beograd	18	7	6	5	32	24	+8	20	Transfer to Spring IA league
4	Bečej	18	9	2	7	25	22	+3	20	Transfer to Spring IA league
5	Rudar Pljevlja	18	7	4	7	23	16	+7	18	
6	Mogren	18	6	6	6	22	24	−2	18	
7	Sloboda Užice	18	5	7	6	18	17	+1	17	
8	Sutjeska	18	3	10	5	21	29	−8	16	
9	Kikinda	18	6	3	9	15	27	−12	15	
10	Jastrebac	18	4	4	10	20	35	−15	12	

Rules for classification: 1) points; 2) goal difference; 3) number of goals scored.
Win: 2pts, Draw: 1pt

Bonus point

- 7: OFK Beograd (3 for 1st place, 4 for obtaining 21-23 points)
- 6: Spartak Subotica (2 for 2nd place, 4 for obtaining 21-23 points)
- 4: Radnički Jugopetrol (1 for 3rd place, 3 for obtaining 18-20 points)
- 4: FK Bečej (1 for 4th place, 3 for obtaining 18-20 points)

==== Results ====
Home \ Away	BEČ	JAS	KIK	MOG	OFK	RNB	RUD	SLO	SPA	SUT
Bečej		5–1	4–0	1–1	0–1	2–0	1–0	1–0	1–0	2–1
Jastrebac	3–0		1–1	2–1	0–3	1–4	4–0	1–1	3–0	0–0
Kikinda	0–2	1–0		2–0	1–0	1–0	1–0	1–1	4–0	2–2
Mogren	3–1	2–1	3–0		1–1	1–1	0–0	3–2	3–2	3–0
OFK Beograd	1–1	3–2	1–0	1–0		3–2	1–0	2–0	2–1	4–2
Radnički Beograd	2–1	1–1	2–1	3–1	2–1		0–0	2–0	1–1	5–0
Rudar Pljevlja	2–0	5–0	3–0	4–0	3–0	2–1		1–0	0–1	1–1
Sloboda Užice	2–0	2–0	2–0	0–0	1–1	1–1	3–1		1–0	0–0
Spartak Subotica	4–0	3–0	5–0	3–0	4–0	4–2	2–0	1–0		0–0
Sutjeska	1–3	3–0	1–0	0–0	3–2	3–3	1–1	2–2	1–1	

Source: EU-Football.info
Legend: Blue = home team win; Yellow = draw; Red = away team win.

== Spring ==
=== IA league ===
==== Table ====
Pos	Team	Pld	W	D	L	GF	GA	GD	Pts
1	Partizan	18	13	3	2	44	10	+34	29
2	Red Star	18	12	2	4	40	18	+22	26
3	Vojvodina	18	8	5	5	29	19	+10	21
4	OFK Beograd	18	7	3	8	21	26	−5	17
5	Spartak Subotica	18	6	5	7	22	26	−4	17
6	Budućnost Podgorica	18	7	2	9	21	33	−12	16
7	Zemun	18	6	3	9	19	25	−6	15
8	Radnički Beograd	18	5	5	8	15	28	−13	15
9	Bečej	18	6	1	11	22	28	−6	13
10	Proleter Zrenjanin	18	4	3	11	8	28	−20	11

Source: RSSSF.org
Rules for classification: 1) points; 2) goal difference; 3) number of goals scored.
Win: 2pts, Draw: 1pt

==== Results ====
Home \ Away	BEČ	BUD	OFK	PAR	PRO	RNB	RSB	SPA	VOJ	ZEM
Bečej		0–1	5–0	0–1	2–1	0–0	1–2	1–2	1–2	1–0
Budućnost Podgorica	1–0		3–2	1–2	5–1	1–1	2–0	3–2	1–1	1–0
OFK Beograd	1–0	3–0		1–1	1–0	3–0	1–4	1–1	2–1	1–1
Partizan	5–0	1–0	3–0		7–0	7–0	1–0	4–0	2–1	2–0
Proleter Zrenjanin	0–1	1–0	0–1	0–0		2–0	1–0	0–1	1–0	0–1
Radnički Beograd	0–4	3–0	1–0	1–2	2–0		1–2	0–0	0–0	3–1
Red Star	3–1	4–0	0–2	3–2	4–0	4–2		5–0	2–1	2–0
Spartak Subotica	1–2	4–0	1–0	1–3	1–1	0–1	2–2		3–0	1–0
Vojvodina	4–2	4–0	3–2	1–0	2–0	0–0	1–1	1–1		5–0
Zemun	4–1	4–2	2–0	1–1	0–0	2–0	0–2	2–1	1–2	

Source: EU-Football.info
Legend: Blue = home team win; Yellow = draw; Red = away team win.

=== IB league ===
==== Table ====
Pos	Team	Pld	W	D	L	GF	GA	GD	Pts
11	Rad	18	9	7	2	28	10	+18	25
12	Napredak Kruševac	18	11	3	4	24	16	+8	25
13	Rudar Pljevlja	18	8	6	4	23	10	+13	22
14	Hajduk Kula	18	8	6	4	22	16	+6	22
15	Radnički Niš	18	8	5	5	27	12	+15	21
16	Sloboda Užice	18	6	3	9	16	22	−6	15
17	Kikinda	18	4	7	7	16	26	−10	15
18	Sutjeska	18	4	5	9	17	34	−17	13
19	Jastrebac	18	4	3	11	14	18	−4	11
20	Mogren	18	4	3	11	12	25	−13	11

Source: RSSSF.org
Rules for classification: 1) points; 2) goal difference; 3) number of goals scored. Win: 2pts, Draw: 1pt

==== Results ====
Home \ Away	HAJ	JAS	KIK	MOG	NAP	RAD	RNI	RUD	SLO	SUT
Hajduk Kula		2–1	3–0	2–0	0–0	0–0	1–0	3–0	2–0	0–1
Jastrebac	2–2		1–0	1–0	1–2	1–0	3–1	0–2	1–1	3–1
Kikinda	3–1	1–0		1–1	3–0	1–2	0–4	0–3	2–1	1–1
Mogren	0–1	1–0	2–0		0–0	0–2	1–0	0–1	1–0	1–2
Napredak Kruševac	2–0	1–0	3–0	2–1		0–0	2–1	3–0	2–1	2–1
Rad	1–0	0–0	0–0	3–2	3–1		0–0	4–0	4–1	0–0
Radnički Niš	2–0	1–0	2–2	5–0	1–0	2–1		0–0	2–0	5–0
Rudar Pljevlja	1–1	1–0	1–1	3–1	3–0	1–1	1–1		0–1	4–3
Sloboda Užice	2–1	1–0	0–0	1–0	0–2	1–3	1–0	0–0		5–1
Sutjeska	1–3	1–0	1–1	1–1	1–2	0–4	0–0	1–2	1–0	

Source: EU-Football.info
Legend: Blue = home team win; Yellow = draw; Red = away team win.

== Final table ==
Pos	Team	Pld	W	D	L	GF	GA	GD	BP	Pts	Qualification or relegation
1	Partizan (C)	18	13	3	2	44	10	+34	13	42	
2	Red Star Belgrade	18	12	2	4	40	18	+22	11	37	
3	Vojvodina	18	8	5	5	29	19	+10	10	31	
4	OFK Beograd	18	7	3	8	21	26	−5	7	24	
5	Spartak Subotica	18	6	5	7	22	26	−4	6	23	
6	Zemun	18	6	3	9	19	25	−6	8	23	
7	Budućnost Podgorica	18	7	2	9	21	33	−12	7	23	Transfer to Autumn IB league
8	Radnički Beograd	18	5	5	8	15	28	−13	4	19	Transfer to Autumn IB league
9	Proleter Zrenjanin	18	4	3	11	8	28	−20	7	18	Transfer to Autumn IB league
10	Bečej	18	6	1	11	22	28	−6	4	17	Transfer to Autumn IB league
11	Rad	18	9	7	2	28	10	+18	7	32	Transfer to Autumn IA league
12	Rudar Pljevlja	18	8	6	4	23	10	+13	7	29	Transfer to Autumn IA league
13	Napredak Kruševac	18	11	3	4	24	16	+8	3	28	Transfer to Autumn IA league
14	Radnički Niš	18	8	5	5	27	12	+15	6	27	Transfer to Autumn IA league
15	Hajduk Kula	18	8	6	4	22	16	+6	3	25	
16	Sloboda Užice	18	6	3	9	16	22	−6	4	19	
17	Kikinda (R)	18	4	7	7	16	26	−10	3	18	Qualification for relegation play-off
18	Sutjeska	18	4	5	9	17	34	−17	4	17	Qualification for relegation play-off
19	Mogren (R)	18	4	3	11	12	25	−13	6	17	Relegation to Second League of FR Yugoslavia
20	Jastrebac (R)	18	4	3	11	14	18	−4	2	13	Relegation to Second League of FR Yugoslavia

Source: RSSSF.org
(C) Champions; (R) Relegated

== Relegation Playoff ==
Team 1	Agg.	Team 2	1st leg	2nd leg
Sutjeska Nikšić	5–1	Novi Pazar	2–1	3–0
Loznica	2–1	Kikinda	1–0	1–1

== Winning squad ==
Champions: FK Partizan
Player	League	
Player	Matches	Goals
(Republika Srpska) Nebojša Gudelj	34	4
(Federal Republic of Yugoslavia) Petar Vasiljević	34	2
(Federal Republic of Yugoslavia) Saša Ćurčić	33	7
(Federal Republic of Yugoslavia) Bratislav Mijalković	33	0
(Federal Republic of Yugoslavia) Savo Milošević	32	21
(Federal Republic of Yugoslavia) Dejan Čurović	32	19
(Federal Republic of Yugoslavia) Goran Pandurović (goalkeeper)	32	0
(Federal Republic of Yugoslavia) Branko Brnović	31	9
(Federal Republic of Yugoslavia) Dragan Ćirić	31	6
(Federal Republic of Yugoslavia) Albert Nađ	30	2
(Federal Republic of Yugoslavia) Zoran Mirković	26	0
(Federal Republic of Yugoslavia) Darko Tešović	24	4
(Federal Republic of Yugoslavia) Nenad Bjeković Jr.	19	4
(Federal Republic of Yugoslavia) Đorđe Tomić	18	1
(Federal Republic of Yugoslavia) Miroslav Čermelj	11	0
(Federal Republic of Yugoslavia) Gordan Petrić (Note: sold to Dundee United during late fall 1993)	10	1
(Federal Republic of Yugoslavia) Ljubomir Vorkapić	8	0
(Federal Republic of Yugoslavia) Đorđe Svetličić	5	0
(Federal Republic of Yugoslavia) Ivan Tomić	4	1
(North Macedonia) Saša Ilić (goalkeeper)	4	0
(Federal Republic of Yugoslavia) Dalibor Škorić	4	0
(Federal Republic of Yugoslavia) Saša Đuričić	2	0
Coach: Ljubiša Tumbaković

== Top goalscorers ==
Rank	Player	Club	Goals
1	(Federal Republic of Yugoslavia) Savo Milošević	Partizan	21
2	(Federal Republic of Yugoslavia) Atila Kasaš	Bečej	20
3	(Federal Republic of Yugoslavia) Darko Kovačević	Proleter Zrenjanin	19
4	(Federal Republic of Yugoslavia) Dejan Čurović	Partizan	18
5	(Federal Republic of Yugoslavia) Anto Drobnjak	Red Star	16
5	(Federal Republic of Yugoslavia) Ilija Ivić	Red Star	16
7	(Federal Republic of Yugoslavia) Nenad Maslovar	Red Star	14
8	(Federal Republic of Yugoslavia) Risto Vidaković	Red Star	12
8	(Federal Republic of Yugoslavia) Radoslav Samardžić	Vojvodina	12
10	(Federal Republic of Yugoslavia) Goran Kovačević	Zemun	11
10	(Federal Republic of Yugoslavia) Dejan Petković	Red Star	11
10	(Federal Republic of Yugoslavia) Srđan Bajčetić	Vojvodina	11
