= Savo Milošević =

Serbian football manager (born 1973)

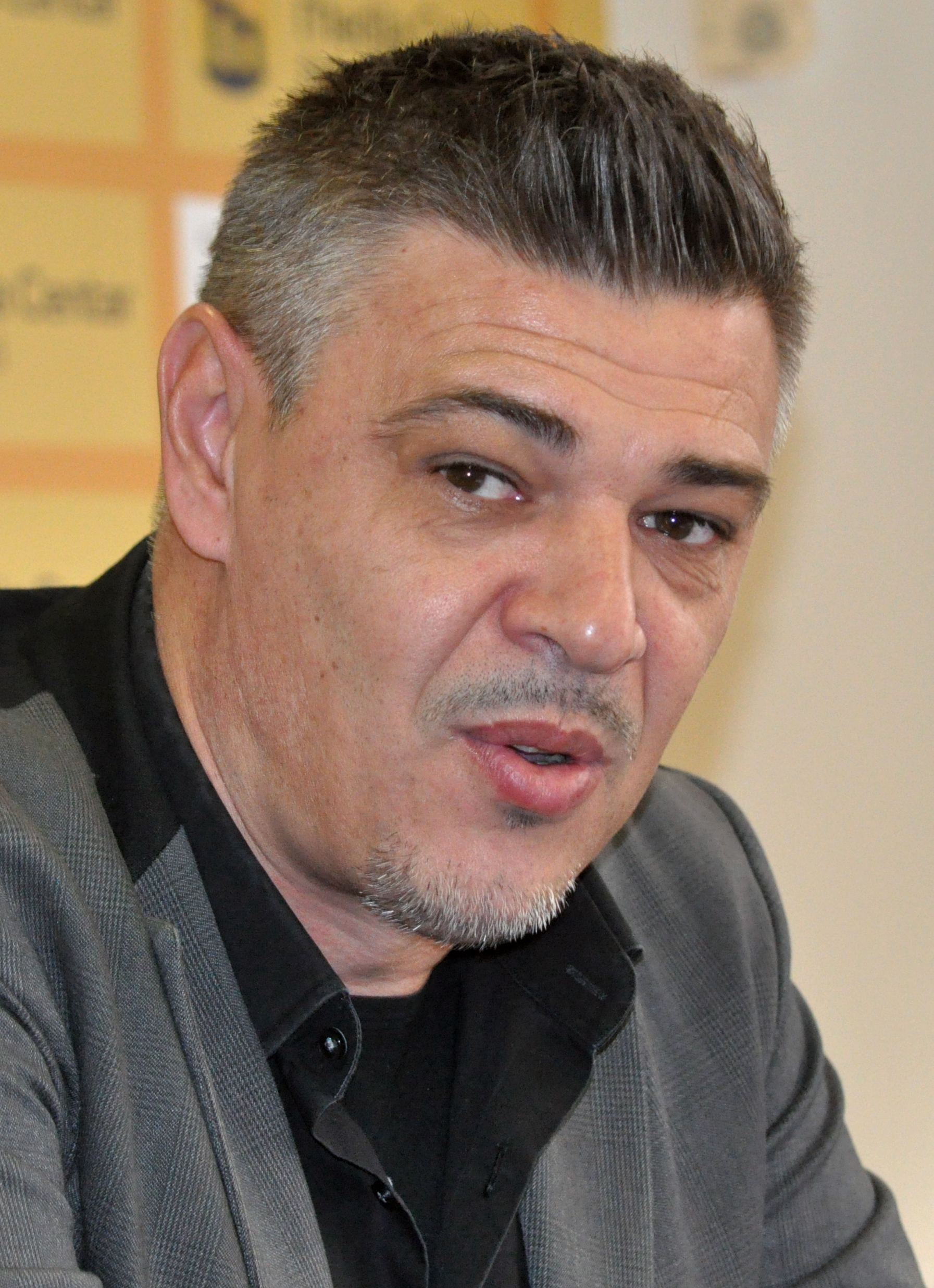
- Milošević in 2017

Personal information
- Date of birth: 2 September 1973 (age 53)
- Place of birth: Bijeljina, SR Bosnia and Herzegovina, SFR Yugoslavia
- Height: 1.86 m (6 ft 1 in)
- Position: Forward

Youth career
- Proleter Ruhotina-Johovac
- Podrinje Janja
- 1989–1992: Partizan

Senior career*
Years	Team	Apps	(Gls)
1992–1995	Partizan	98	(65)
1995–1998	Aston Villa	90	(29)
1998–2000	Zaragoza	72	(38)
2000–2004	Parma	31	(9)
2002	→ Zaragoza (loan)	16	(6)
2002–2003	→ Espanyol (loan)	34	(12)
2003–2004	→ Celta (loan)	37	(14)
2004–2007	Osasuna	82	(21)
2008	Rubin Kazan	16	(3)
Total		476	(197)

International career
1994–2008	Serbia (Note: Including 101 caps and 35 goals for Serbia and Montenegro (known as FR Yugoslavia until 2003))	102	(37)

Managerial career
- 2019–2020: Partizan
- 2021: Olimpija Ljubljana
- 2023–2024: Bosnia and Herzegovina
- 2024: Partizan
- 2025: Nassaji Mazandaran
- 2026: Željezničar
- * Club domestic league appearances and goals

Savo Milošević (Serbian Cyrillic: Саво Милошевић, pronounced [sǎːʋo milǒːʃeʋitɕ]; born 2 September 1973) is a Serbian professional football manager and former player.

A former forward, Milošević was Aston Villa's record signing after making a name for himself at Partizan. He would go on to spend the vast majority of his career in Spain, where he amassed La Liga totals of 91 goals in 241 games for Zaragoza, Espanyol, Celta and Osasuna. Over the course of his 16-year professional career, Milošević played for eight clubs and scored over 220 goals in nearly 600 official appearances.

At the international level, Milošević played for the national team of FR Yugoslavia (later renamed Serbia and Montenegro) and Serbia, making over 100 caps for both teams combined. He appeared in two World Cups and one European Championship, at which he earned the Golden Boot at Euro 2000.

== Club career ==
=== Partizan ===
Milošević started playing football at the age of six and spent his youth in the Drina Valley. At the age of 14, he was spotted by Partizan scouts, who convinced the club to secure his transfer for 5,000 Deutsche Mark.

In 1992, Milošević made his senior debut for Partizan, scoring 14 goals in 31 games during his first season at the club. He went on to score an impressive 21 and 30 league goals in his next two seasons respectively – competition-bests in both years – as the Belgrade-based club won back-to-back national championships, including the double in the 1993–94 season.

=== Aston Villa ===
In the summer of 1995, then Aston Villa manager Brian Little bought Milošević from Partizan for £3.5 million, a club record at the time. His spell in England lasted three seasons, during which time he earned the tabloid nickname "Miss-a-lot-ević" owing to his frequent goalscoring dry spells.

However, Milošević did score 33 goals in 117 games for Villa (29 in the Premier League), including one in the 1996 Football League Cup final, a 3–0 win against Leeds United.

The author Lee Child is a fan of Aston Villa; in his 2nd book in the Jack Reacher series, Die Trying (1998), the naming of the fictional characters, FBI agents Milosevic and Paul "Mack" McGrath are hidden references to players Milošević and Paul McGrath.

=== Zaragoza ===
Milošević signed for La Liga club Real Zaragoza in 1998 for £8.5 million, again recording some impressive goalscoring performances, notably netting 21 in the 1999–2000 season as the team secured fourth place.

=== Parma ===
After rediscovering his form in Spain, Milošević joined Parma in the summer of 2000 for €25 million. He was a regular starter in his first season in Italy, playing in 21 out of 34 Serie A matches and scoring 8 goals; in the next season, however, he was sparingly used.

Milošević was loaned back to Spain in January 2002, re-joining his former club Zaragoza to replace Blackburn Rovers-bound Yordi. He scored six times during his second spell, finishing as the club's joint top scorer – alongside Yordi and Roberto Acuña. His second spell at Zaragoza ended unsuccessfully, with the club eventually relegated.

In the 2002–03 campaign, Milošević played for Espanyol on loan, again finishing as his team's top scorer but narrowly escaping relegation, a fate that would befall him the following year with Celta de Vigo. Milošević was able to help Celta reach the round-of-16 in their first ever appearance in the UEFA Champions League, with his one goal in seven appearances in the competition coming in a 3–2 group stage home win against Ajax.

=== Later years ===
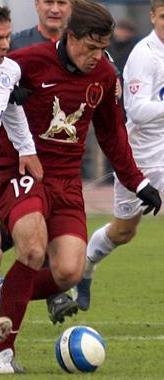
Milošević in action for Rubin Kazan in 2008

In mid-July 2004, aged 30, Milošević signed a three-year contract with another Spanish top flight club, Osasuna. In his second season with the Navarrese, he scored 11 goals in 32 games to help the team qualify for the Champions League. Though Milošević failed to score in ten appearances in the subsequent UEFA Cup semi-final run, he did provide two assists in a 3–0 away win against Bayer Leverkusen in the first leg of the quarter-final (which Osasuna won 4–0 on aggregate).

In the summer of 2007, Milošević's contract expired and he left Osasuna after three seasons at the club. He took an eight-month break from competitive football, during which – in October 2007 – he had a trial with Major League Soccer's Toronto FC with a view of signing with them for the 2008 season. The deal fell through and, on 8 March 2008, he agreed terms with Rubin Kazan prior to the start of the Russian Premier League campaign.

On 2 November 2008, Milošević scored the decisive goal for Rubin in a game against Saturn Ramenskoye, securing the team their first ever national championship. He retired shortly afterwards, aged 35.

== International career ==
Milošević represented the Yugoslavia under-21 national team at the 1992 Toulon Tournament, reaching the final with the team. He later earned 102 caps for Serbia, making his international debut for the nation (then named Federal Republic of Yugoslavia) on 23 December 1994, in a 2–0 friendly loss to Brazil. Milošević scored 37 goals for his country over the course of a 14-year international career.

After appearing in two games at the 1998 FIFA World Cup, Milošević scored five goals at UEFA Euro 2000, earning him the Golden Boot, an award he shared with Dutch forward Patrick Kluivert.

Milošević made his 100th international appearance on 16 June 2006 during the FIFA World Cup in Germany, in a 6–0 group stage loss against Argentina, becoming the first Serbian player to reach this milestone. As a formal farewell from international football, he was called up for a friendly with Bulgaria on 19 November 2008, scoring twice and missing two penalties in a 6–1 win before being replaced by Dragan Mrđa.

== Managerial career ==
=== Montenegro (assistant) ===
From 2011 to 2012, Milošević was an assistant manager to Branko Brnović at the Montenegro national team.

=== Partizan ===
On 27 March 2019, Milošević was named by the board of directors at Partizan as the club's new manager. His first win as Partizan manager came on 3 April 2019, beating Čukarički 3–2 at home.

In Milošević's first Eternal derby as manager of Partizan, his team suffered a 2–1 away loss to Red Star Belgrade, with Ricardo Gomes's 90th-minute strike proving only a consolation.

At the end of his first season in charge, Milošević succeeded in qualifying Partizan for the 2019–20 UEFA Europa League qualifying rounds, and on 23 May 2019, won his first managerial trophy as his side beat Red Star Belgrade 1–0 in the 2018–19 Serbian Cup final, courtesy of a Bojan Ostojić goal.

In July and August 2019, Partizan secured their ninth participation in the group stages of the UEFA Europa League. Under Milošević's leadership, Partizan knocked-out Connah's Quay Nomads, Yeni Malatyaspor and Molde in the qualifiers. On 30 August, Partizan was drawn in to Group L of the 2019–20 UEFA Europa League, alongside Manchester United, Astana and AZ Alkmaar.

=== Olimpija Ljubljana ===
On 16 June 2021, Milošević was named new manager of Slovenian PrvaLiga side Olimpija Ljubljana. He left the club less than four months later, on 10 October 2021.

=== Bosnia and Herzegovina ===
On 29 September 2023, Milošević was appointed as the new head coach of the Bosnia and Herzegovina national team. He was victorious in his first game in charge against Liechtenstein in a UEFA Euro 2024 qualifying match on 13 October 2023. Milošević suffered his first defeat against Portugal on 16 October; Bosnia and Herzegovina lost the game 5–0 at Bilino Polje, the biggest defeat in its history on home ground.

Milošević's contract expired on 21 March 2024, following the country's defeat against Ukraine in the UEFA Euro 2024 qualifying play-offs. On 16 April 2024, it was officially announced that the contract would not be extended.

=== Return to Partizan ===
In late September 2024, Milošević returned to Partizan succeeding Aleksandar Stanojević. His first competitive game back in charge of Partizan ended in a 3–1 away win over Mladost Lučani on 29 September. Despite embarking on a nine-game undefeated run, and securing seven wins, Milošević left Partizan in December over disagreements with the club's management.

=== Nassaji Mazandaran ===
In January 2025, Milošević was appointed manager of Iranian side Nassaji Mazandaran. However, after winning two of his ten opening matches at the club, he left Nassaji in April 2025.

=== Željezničar ===
On 28 February 2026, Milošević was appointed manager of Bosnian Premier League club Željezničar. He took charge of the squad on 3 March, a day after their league match against Zrinjski Mostar. In his first match in charge, he led Željezničar to a 3–0 away win over Sloga Doboj on 7 March. Milošević suffered his first defeat as Željezničar manager on 14 March, conceding a late goal at home against Borac Banja Luka in the league.

Despite losing only twice in eleven games, Milošević resigned and left Željezničar two months later in May, citing collapse "of an earlier agreement on a long-term project with the club's management."

== Personal life ==
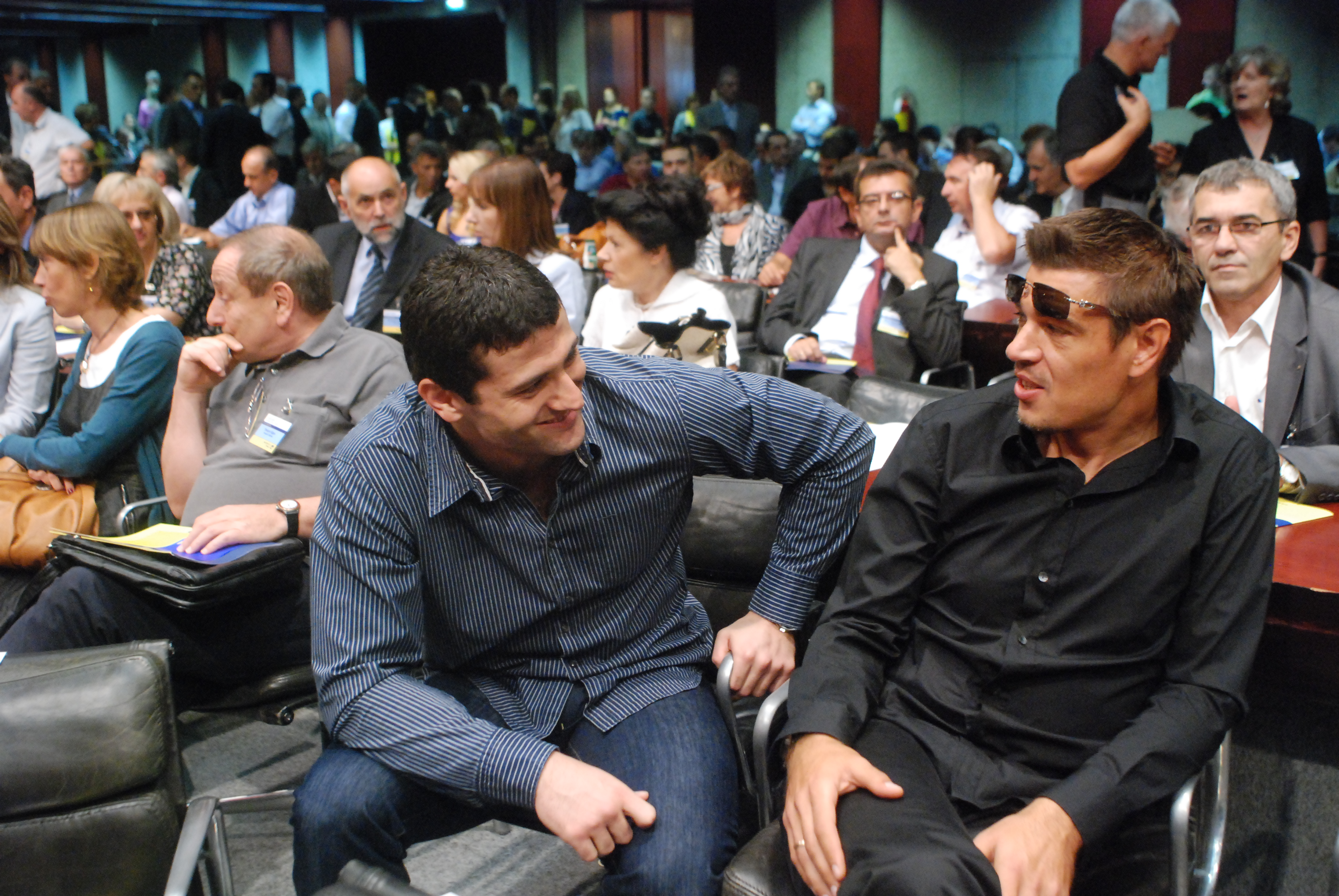
Milošević with former water polo player and future Belgrade mayor Aleksandar Šapić at a Democratic Party convention in September 2009

Milošević was born into an ethnic Serb family in the Semberija city of Bijeljina and was raised in Johovac, Republic of Srpska, both in present-day Bosnia and Herzegovina, the then-SR Bosnia and Herzegovina, SFR Yugoslavia, where he lived with a younger brother Andrija (1975–2013) and younger sister Cvijeta "Mira". He also holds Bosnian citizenship. Milošević's mother died in 2000 from cancer; he has paternal ancestry from the large Milošević brotherhood of the Vasojevići tribe in northeastern Montenegro, and was a relative of Slobodan Milošević.

Milošević was a political supporter of the Democratic Party led by Boris Tadić, having supported it since 1993 after meeting with Zoran Đinđić and officially becoming a member in 2003. He took part in the 1996–97 protests and the 5 October overthrow.

Milošević was married to Vesna, with whom he has two sons and a daughter. One of his sons, Nikola, was also a footballer. Since 2017 he has been in a relationship with Serbian cellist Natalija Tipsarević. On 11 June 2011, his father Stevan (1953–2011) was shot in the chest and killed in the family house in Glavičice by his grandfather Savo (1928–2012), after a family row; the latter was later detained.

== Career statistics ==
=== Club ===
Appearances and goals by club, season and competition
Club	Season	League			National cup		League cup		Continental		Total	
Club	Season	Division	Apps	Goals	Apps	Goals	Apps	Goals	Apps	Goals	Apps	Goals
Partizan	1992–93	First League of FR Yugoslavia	31	14	8	3	—		—		39	17
Partizan	1993–94	First League of FR Yugoslavia	32	21	9	7	—		—		41	28
Partizan	1994–95	First League of FR Yugoslavia	35	30	4	4	—		—		39	34
Partizan	Total		98	65	21	14	—		—		119	79
Aston Villa	1995–96	Premier League	37	12	5	1	7	1	—		49	14
Aston Villa	1996–97	Premier League	30	10	3	0	1	0	2 (Note: Appearances in UEFA Cup)	0	36	10
Aston Villa	1997–98	Premier League	23	7	2	1	1	0	6	2	32	10
Aston Villa	Total		90	29	10	2	9	1	8	2	117	34
Zaragoza	1998–99	La Liga	35	17	2	1	—		—		37	18
Zaragoza	1999–2000	La Liga	37	21	5	1	—		—		42	22
Zaragoza	Total		72	38	7	2	—		—		79	40
Parma	2000–01	Serie A	21	8	5	2	—		5	2	31	12
Parma	2001–02	Serie A	10	1	3	1	—		6 (Note: Four appearances and one goal in UEFA Cup, two appearances in UEFA Champions League)	1	19	3
Parma	Total		31	9	8	3	—		11	3	50	15
Zaragoza (loan)	2001–02	La Liga	16	6	—		—		—		16	6
Espanyol (loan)	2002–03	La Liga	34	12	1	0	—		—		35	12
Celta (loan)	2003–04	La Liga	37	14	5	1	—		9 (Note: Appearances in UEFA Champions League)	1	51	16
Osasuna	2004–05	La Liga	27	6	7	0	—		—		34	6
Osasuna	2005–06	La Liga	32	11	—		—		2	1	34	12
Osasuna	2006–07	La Liga	23	4	1	0	—		12 (Note: Ten appearances in UEFA Cup, two appearances in UEFA Champions League)	0	36	4
Osasuna	Total		82	21	8	0	—		14	1	104	22
Rubin Kazan	2008	Russian Premier League	16	3	1	0	—		—		17	3
Career total			476	197	61	22	9	1	42	6	588	226

=== International ===
Appearances and goals by national team and year
National team	Year	Apps	Goals
FR Yugoslavia	1994	1	0
FR Yugoslavia	1995	7	4
FR Yugoslavia	1996	7	5
FR Yugoslavia	1997	9	5
FR Yugoslavia	1998	11	2
FR Yugoslavia	1999	7	4
FR Yugoslavia	2000	12	6
FR Yugoslavia	2001	8	5
FR Yugoslavia	2002	9	1
Serbia and Montenegro	2003	10	1
Serbia and Montenegro	2004	7	2
Serbia and Montenegro	2005	8	0
Serbia and Montenegro	2006	5	0
Serbia	2007	0	0
Serbia	2008	1	2
Total		102	37

Scores and results list FR Yugoslavia, Serbia and Montenegro and Serbia's goal tally first, score column indicates score after each Milošević goal.

List of international goals scored by Savo Milošević
No.	Date	Venue	Opponent	Score	Result	Competition
1	31 January 1995	Hong Kong Stadium, So Kon Po, Hong Kong	Hong Kong XI	2–1	3–1	1995 Lunar New Year Cup
2	31 January 1995	Hong Kong Stadium, So Kon Po, Hong Kong	Hong Kong XI	3–1	3–1	1995 Lunar New Year Cup
3	31 March 1995	Red Star Stadium, Belgrade, FR Yugoslavia	Uruguay	1–0	1–0	Friendly
4	29 September 1995	Toumba Stadium, Thessaloniki, Greece	Greece	1–0	2–0	Friendly
5	24 April 1996	Red Star Stadium, Belgrade, FR Yugoslavia	Faroe Islands	3–0	3–1	1998 FIFA World Cup qualification
6	2 June 1996	Red Star Stadium, Belgrade, FR Yugoslavia	Malta	4–0	5–0	1998 FIFA World Cup qualification
7	6 October 1996	Svangaskarð, Toftir, Faroe Islands	Faroe Islands	1–0	8–1	1998 FIFA World Cup qualification
8	6 October 1996	Svangaskarð, Toftir, Faroe Islands	Faroe Islands	4–1	8–1	1998 FIFA World Cup qualification
9	6 October 1996	Svangaskarð, Toftir, Faroe Islands	Faroe Islands	5–1	8–1	1998 FIFA World Cup qualification
10	10 February 1997	Hong Kong Stadium, So Kon Po, Hong Kong	Hong Kong XI	1–0	3–1	1997 Lunar New Year Cup
11	2 April 1997	Letná Stadium, Prague, Czech Republic	Czech Republic	2–1	2–1	1998 FIFA World Cup qualification
12	11 October 1997	National Stadium, Ta' Qali, Malta	Malta	1–0	5–0	1998 FIFA World Cup qualification
13	29 October 1997	Stadion Albert Flórián, Budapest, Hungary	Hungary	7–0	7–1	1998 FIFA World Cup qualification
14	15 November 1997	Red Star Stadium, Belgrade, FR Yugoslavia	Hungary	1–0	5–0	1998 FIFA World Cup qualification
15	29 May 1998	Red Star Stadium, Belgrade, FR Yugoslavia	Nigeria	1–0	3–0	Friendly
16	23 September 1998	Castelão, São Luís, Brazil	Brazil	1–0	1–1	Friendly
17	10 February 1999	National Stadium, Ta' Qali, Malta	Malta	3–0	3–0	UEFA Euro 2000 qualification
18	8 June 1999	Toumba Stadium, Thessaloniki, Greece	Malta	2–1	4–1	UEFA Euro 2000 qualification
19	8 June 1999	Toumba Stadium, Thessaloniki, Greece	Malta	4–1	4–1	UEFA Euro 2000 qualification
20	8 September 1999	Philip II Arena, Skopje, Macedonia	Macedonia	1–0	4–2	UEFA Euro 2000 qualification
21	13 June 2000	Stade du Pays de Charleroi, Charleroi, Belgium	Slovenia	1–3	3–3	UEFA Euro 2000
22	13 June 2000	Stade du Pays de Charleroi, Charleroi, Belgium	Slovenia	2–3	3–3	UEFA Euro 2000
23	18 June 2000	Stade Maurice Dufrasne, Liège, Belgium	Norway	1–0	1–0	UEFA Euro 2000
24	21 June 2000	Jan Breydel Stadium, Bruges, Belgium	Spain	1–0	3–4	UEFA Euro 2000
25	25 June 2000	Feijenoord Stadion, Rotterdam, Netherlands	Netherlands	1–6	1–6	UEFA Euro 2000
26	3 September 2000	Stade Josy Barthel, Luxembourg City, Luxembourg	Luxembourg	1–0	2–0	2002 FIFA World Cup qualification
27	28 March 2001	Bežigrad Stadium, Ljubljana, Slovenia	Slovenia	1–0	1–1	2002 FIFA World Cup qualification
28	6 June 2001	Svangaskarð, Toftir, Faroe Islands	Faroe Islands	4–0	6–0	2002 FIFA World Cup qualification
29	1 September 2001	St. Jakob-Park, Basel, Switzerland	Switzerland	1–1	2–1	2002 FIFA World Cup qualification
30	6 October 2001	Partizan Stadium, Belgrade, FR Yugoslavia	Luxembourg	4–2	6–2	2002 FIFA World Cup qualification
31	6 October 2001	Partizan Stadium, Belgrade, FR Yugoslavia	Luxembourg	5–2	6–2	2002 FIFA World Cup qualification
32	13 February 2002	Chase Field, Phoenix, United States	Mexico	2–0	2–1	Friendly
33	11 October 2003	Millennium Stadium, Cardiff, Wales	Wales	2–1	3–2	UEFA Euro 2004 qualification
34	11 July 2004	Hakata no Mori Stadium, Fukuoka, Japan	Slovakia	1–0	2–0	2004 Kirin Cup
35	13 October 2004	Red Star Stadium, Belgrade, Serbia and Montenegro	San Marino	1–0	5–0	2006 FIFA World Cup qualification
36	19 November 2008	Partizan Stadium, Belgrade, Serbia	Bulgaria	3–1	6–1	Friendly
37	19 November 2008	Partizan Stadium, Belgrade, Serbia	Bulgaria	4–1	6–1	Friendly

== Managerial statistics ==
As of match played 10 May 2026

Managerial record by team and tenure
Team	From	To	Record				
Team	From	To	P	W	D	L	Win %
Partizan	27 March 2019	1 September 2020	67	43	8	16	64.18
Olimpija Ljubljana	16 June 2021	10 October 2021	16	8	2	6	50.00
Bosnia and Herzegovina	29 September 2023	21 March 2024	5	1	0	4	20.00
Partizan	27 September 2024	2 December 2024	9	7	2	0	77.78
Nassaji Mazandaran	28 January 2025	12 April 2025	10	2	3	5	20.00
Željezničar	3 March 2026	14 May 2026	11	4	5	2	36.36
Total			118	65	20	33	55.08

== Honours ==
=== Player ===
Partizan

- First League of Serbia and Montenegro: 1992–93, 1993–94
- Yugoslav Cup: 1993–94

Aston Villa

- Football League Cup: 1995–96

Rubin Kazan

- Russian Premier League: 2008

Individual

- First League of FR Yugoslavia top goalscorer: 1993–94, 1994–95
- UEFA Euro 2000: Golden Boot, Team of the Tournament

=== Manager ===
Partizan

- Serbian Cup: 2018–19

== See also ==
- List of men's footballers with 100 or more international caps
