= Ljubiša Tumbaković =

Serbian footballer and manager

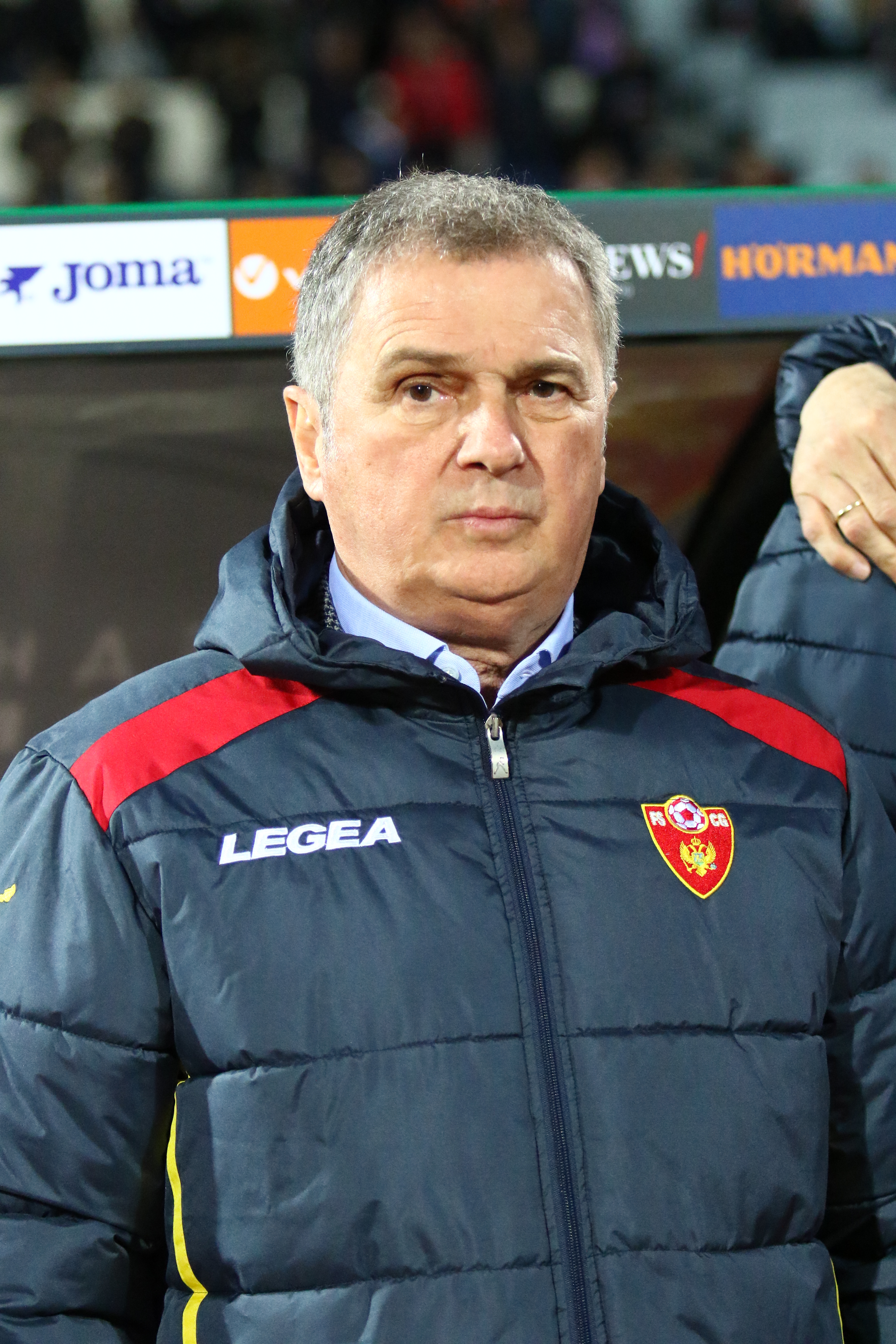
- Tumbaković as Montenegro manager in 2019

Personal information
- Date of birth: 2 September 1952 (age 74)
- Place of birth: Belgrade, PR Serbia, FPR Yugoslavia
- Position: Midfielder

Youth career
- 1962–1964: Radnički Belgrade
- 1964–1970: Partizan

Senior career*
Years	Team	Apps	(Gls)
1970–1976	Partizan	0	(0)
1971–1972	→ Vardar (loan)		
1972–1973	→ Radnički Sombor (loan)	29	(3)

Managerial career
- 1980–1985: Radnički Belgrade (youth)
- 1985–1987: Obilić (youth)
- 1987–1989: Radnički Belgrade
- 1989–1990: Khaitan (youth)
- 1990–1992: Partizan (youth)
- 1992–1999: Partizan
- 1999–2000: AEK Athens
- 2000–2002: Partizan
- 2003–2004: Al Nassr
- 2004–2009: Shandong Luneng
- 2010: Steel Azin
- 2013: Wuhan Zall
- 2016–2019: Montenegro
- 2019–2020: Serbia
- * Club domestic league appearances and goals

Ljubiša Tumbaković (Serbian Cyrillic: Љубиша Тумбаковић, pronounced [ʎǔbiʃa tumbȃːkoʋitɕ, - tǔː-]; born 2 September 1952) is a Serbian former football manager and player. He was most recently the manager of the Serbia national team.

Tumbaković is the most successful coach in the history of Serbian powerhouse Partizan which he led to six national championship titles and three national cup wins during his two spells at the club between 1992 and 2002.

== Playing career ==
Born in Belgrade's urban neighborhood of Dorćol, Tumbaković started out in the youth categories of Radnički Beograd in 1962. Two years later, he joined the youth ranks of Partizan. In 1970, with Tumbaković turning 18, he joined the senior squad. Although he didn't appear in any domestic league matches for Partizan, he did appear in 45 friendlies, scoring 6 goals.

Tumbaković played for Vardar in the 1971–72 Yugoslav First League.

== Managerial career ==
=== Partizan ===
Tumbaković started his management career with Partizan in 1992. Partizan were in the doldrums when Tumbaković took control, however he immediately brought success to Partizan by winning the league with them in his debut season. This was a feat that he would repeat five times during his first time with Partizan as well as winning three FR Yugoslavia Cups. These achievements caught the eye of AEK Athens F.C. who finished third in the league under Tumbaković's management.

=== Return to Partizan ===
Tumbaković returned to Partizan at the beginning of the 2000–01 season after a season away from the club and with the NATO attacks on Yugoslavia firmly behind the league, Tumbaković would continue establishing Partizan as one of the strongest teams in the league. However, despite more domestic success with Partizan where they won the 2001/02 league title European success was far more difficult to achieve. He would stand down from his position after almost a decade in charge of FK Partizan where he was one of the most successful coaches in Yugoslavian football history.

=== Shandong Luneng ===
In 2003, he would coach Saudi team Al Nassr for a short period. However, he quickly moved to Chinese team Shandong Luneng at the beginning of their 2004 league season. Tumbaković who was the second Serbian to manage Shandong after Slobodan Santrač, was to make a quick impression at the club when he won the Chinese FA Cup and took them second in league. Ljubiša would continue to establish Shandong as genuine title contenders throughout the 2005 league season despite them coming third within the league and being unable to retain their FA Cup. It was within the 2006 league season which established Shandong as a significant force within the Chinese Super League when they won the league by 17 points and FA cup. Their dominance was repeated when they again won the league title in 2008.

=== Montenegro ===
Tumbaković was appointed head coach of the Montenegro national team on 19 January 2016 and was sacked on 7 June 2019 after refusing to take charge of a UEFA Euro 2020 qualifying game against Kosovo and abandoning the staff on the match day.

=== Serbia ===
He was appointed as the manager of the Serbia national team on 1 July 2019. After Serbia finished third in their UEFA Euro 2020 qualifying group, he left the position in December 2020 after not qualifying for Euro 2020, being eliminated by Scotland on penalties in the qualifying play-offs, after star striker Aleksandar Mitrović failed to convert his spot kick in the shootout.

== Managerial statistics ==
Team	From	To	Record				
Team	From	To	G	W	D	L	Win %
Partizan	July 1992	June 1999	295	214	46	35	72.54
AEK Athens	June 1999	January 2000	26	14	5	7	53.85
Partizan	May 2000	December 2002	110	80	15	15	72.73
Al Nassr	July 2003	December 2003	13	8	2	3	61.54
Shandong Luneng	January 2004	November 2009	203	118	47	38	58.13
Steel Azin	July 2010	October 2010	10	3	3	4	30.00
Wuhan Zall	April 2013	August 2013	15	2	3	10	13.33
Montenegro	January 2016	June 2019	27	7	8	12	25.93
Serbia	July 2019	December 2020	14	6	5	3	42.86
Total			734	458	144	132	62.40

== Honours ==
=== Manager ===
Partizan

- FR Yugoslavia First League: 1992–93, 1993–94, 1995–96, 1996–97, 1998–99, 2001–02
- FR Yugoslavia Cup: 1993–94, 1997–98, 2000–01

Shandong Luneng

- Chinese Super League: 2006, 2008
- Chinese FA Cup: 2004, 2006

Individual

- Serbian Coach of the Year: 2006
