= 1993–94 FR Yugoslavia Cup =

Tournament details
- Country: Yugoslavia
- Teams: 32

Final positions
- Champions: Partizan
- Runners-up: Spartak Subotica

Tournament statistics
- Matches played: 46
- Goals scored: 138 (3 per match)

The 1993–94 FR Yugoslavia Cup was the second season of the FR Yugoslavia's annual football cup. The cup defenders was Red Star Belgrade, but was defeated by FK Partizan in the semi-finals. FK Partizan went on to become the winner of the competition, after they defeated Spartak Subotica.

== First round ==
Team 1	Score	Team 2
Agrounija Inđija (II)	1–3	Spartak Subotica
Bačka (III)	2–1	Sutjeska
Borac Banja Luka (Note: Between 1992 and 1995, Borac Banja Luka participated in the national competitions organized by the Football Association of FR Yugoslavia. They played their home games in Valjevo due to the Bosnian War.) (II)	1–3	Partizan
Borac Čačak (II)	2–1	Hajduk Kula
Dubočica (II)	2–3	Kikinda
Bečej	6–0	Budućnost Podgorica
Zemun	2–0	Dinamo Pančevo (II)
Mogren	3–2	Sloboda Užice (II)
Napredak Kruševac	3–0	Jedinstvo Bijelo Polje (II)
Proleter Zrenjanin	4–0	Zastava Kragujevac (II)
Rad	6–0	Priština (II)
Radnički Kragujevac (III)	1–3	OFK Beograd
Radnički Niš	3–2	Novi Sad (II)
Rudar Pljevlja	0–1	Obilić (II)
Trepča (?)	1–2	Radnički Novi Beograd
Vojvodina	3–4	Red Star

Note: Roman numerals in brackets denote the league tier the clubs participated in the 1993–94 season.

== Second round ==
Team 1	Agg.	Team 2	1st leg	2nd leg
Bačka (III)	1–5	Radnički Niš	0–2	1–3
Bečej	1–2	Partizan	1–0	0–2
Obilić (II)	2–3	Red Star	2–1	0–2
Mogren	1–4	Spartak Subotica	0–1	1–3
Napredak Kruševac	1–1 (4–1 p)	Kikinda	0–1	1–0
OFK Beograd	5–5 (a)	Borac Čačak (II)	2–1	3–4
Proleter Zrenjanin	2–1	Rad	2–0	0–1
Radnički Novi Beograd	1–2	Zemun	0–1	1–1

Note: Roman numerals in brackets denote the league tier the clubs participated in the 1993–94 season.

== Quarter-finals ==
Team 1	Agg.	Team 2	1st leg	2nd leg
Red Star	2–0	Proleter Zrenjanin	1–0	1–0
Napredak Kruševac	3–3 (4–5 p)	Radnički Niš	2–1	1–2
Partizan	7–1	OFK Beograd	4–1	3–0
Spartak Subotica	2–1	Zemun	1–1	1–0

== Semi-finals ==
Team 1	Agg.	Team 2	1st leg	2nd leg
Red Star	2–3	Partizan	1–0	1–3
Spartak Subotica	3–2	Radnički Niš	2–1	1–1

== Final ==
=== First leg ===
4 May 1994

Spartak Subotica	2–3	Partizan
Milidrag 32'; Nestorović 38'		Čurović 10'; Milošević 45'; Ćirić 54'

Subotica City Stadium, Subotica
Attendance: 12,000
Referee: Branimir Babarogić (Belgrade)

=== Second leg ===
11 May 1994

Partizan	6–1	Spartak Subotica
Milošević 17' (pen.), 39', 86'; Čurović 31', 43', 85'		Puhalak 73'

Partizan Stadium, Belgrade
Attendance: 8,000
Referee: Zdravko Jokić (Belgrade)

Partizan won 9–4 on aggregate.

== See also ==
- 1993–94 First League of FR Yugoslavia
- 1993–94 Second League of FR Yugoslavia
