= Serbia and Montenegro national football team results =

This is an incomplete list of the Serbia and Montenegro national football team matches.

== FR Yugoslavia ==
=== 1994 ===
12 December 1994 International friendly	Brazil	2–0	FR Yugoslavia	Porto Alegre, Brazil
	Viola 26'; Branco 67'	Report		Stadium: Estádio Olímpico Monumental; Attendance: 32,112; Referee: José Mocelin (Brazil)

27 December 1994 International friendly	Argentina	1–0	FR Yugoslavia	Buenos Aires, Argentina
	Ortega 21'	Report		Stadium: Estadio Monumental Antonio Vespucio Liberti; Attendance: 20,000; Referee: Luis Para Jorge Nieves (Uruguay)

=== 1995 ===
31 January 1995 1995 Lunar New Year Cup	Hong Kong	1–3	FR Yugoslavia	Hong Kong
	Chung Su Cheng 64'	Report	Nađ 64'; Milošević 42', 83'	Stadium: Government Stadium; Attendance: 45,000; Referee: Yau Fat Jame Fong (Hong Kong)

4 February 1995 1995 Lunar New Year Cup	South Korea	0–1	FR Yugoslavia	Hong Kong
		Report	Kovačević 50'	Stadium: Government Stadium; Attendance: 45,000; Referee: Yim Kim Ng (Hong Kong)

31 March 1995 International Friendly	FR Yugoslavia	1–0	Uruguay	Belgrade, Yugoslavia
	Milošević 71'	Report		Stadium: Red Star Stadium; Attendance: 28,288; Referee: Sándor Puhl (Hungary)

31 May 1995 International Friendly	FR Yugoslavia	1–2	Russia	Belgrade, Yugoslavia
	Petković 34'	Report	Karpin 33' (pen.); Beschastnykh 41'	Stadium: Red Star Stadium; Attendance: 18,292; Referee: Giorgos Bikas (Greece)

20 September 1995 International Friendly	Greece	0–2	FR Yugoslavia	Thessaloniki, Greece
		Report	Ćurčić 55'; Milošević 85'	Stadium: Toumba Stadium; Attendance: 20,000; Referee: Stefan Ormandzhiev (Bulgaria)

12 November 1995 International Friendly	El Salvador	1–4	FR Yugoslavia	San Salvador, El Salvador
	Rodriguez 35'	Report	Mihajlović 12'; Savićević 31' (pen.), 43'; Trigueros 60' (o.g.)	Stadium: Estadio Flor Blanca; Attendance: 27,000; Referee: Victorino Rodriguez Portillo (El Salvador)

16 November 1995 International Friendly	Mexico	1–4	FR Yugoslavia	Monterrey, Mexico
	Hernández 24'	Report	Kovačević 5', 16'; Mihajlović 35'; Saveljić 48'	Stadium: Estadio Tecnológico; Attendance: 25,000; Referee: Ramoz Luis Mendez Vega (Costa Rica)

=== 1996 ===
27 March 1996 International friendly	FR Yugoslavia	1–0	Romania	Belgrade, Yugoslavia
	Stojković 51'	Report		Stadium: Red Star Stadium; Attendance: 28,196; Referee: Dimitar Momirov (Bulgaria)

24 April 1996 1998 FIFA World Cup qualifying Group 6	FR Yugoslavia	3–1	Faroe Islands	Belgrade, Yugoslavia
19:00 (UTC+2)	Savićević 3', 29'; Mihajlović (yellow card) 33'; Milošević 38'	Report	Dam (yellow card) 18'; Petersen 53'	Stadium: Red Star Stadium; Attendance: 16,325; Referee: Roland Beck (Liechtenstein)

23 May 1996 Kirin Cup	Mexico	0–0	FR Yugoslavia	Shizuoka, Japan
		Report		Stadium: IAI Stadium Nihondaira; Attendance: 8,604; Referee: Masayoshi Okada (Japan)

26 May 1996 Kirin Cup	Japan	1–0	FR Yugoslavia	Tokyo, Japan
	Miura 62'	Report		Stadium: National Olympic Stadium; Attendance: 50,632; Referee: Young-Joo Kim (South Korea)

2 June 1996 1998 FIFA World Cup qualifying Group 6	FR Yugoslavia	6–0	Malta	Belgrade, Yugoslavia
20:00 (UTC+2)	Attard 2' (o.g.); Mijatović 38'; Stojković 45'; Milošević 68'; Savićević 70', 72' (pen.)	Report	Debono (yellow card) 58'; Woods (yellow card) 63'; Buhagiar (yellow card) 70'	Stadium: Red Star Stadium; Attendance: 11,611; Referee: Hermann Albrecht (Germany)

6 October 1996 1998 FIFA World Cup qualifying Group 6	Faroe Islands	1–8	FR Yugoslavia	Toftir, Faroe Islands
15:00 (UTC+1)	Müller 26' (yellow card) 56'; Dam (yellow card) 51'; Jónsson (yellow card) 59'; Mørkøre (yellow card) 69'	Report	Milošević 6', 30', 38'; Jokanović 11', 58'; Mijatović 28'; Jugović 68'; Nađ (yellow card) 81'; Stojković 89' (pen.)	Stadium: Svangaskarð; Attendance: 1,017; Referee: Leslie Irvine (Northern Ireland)

11 November 1996 1998 FIFA World Cup qualifying Group 6	FR Yugoslavia	1–0	Czech Republic	Belgrade, Yugoslavia
18:00 (UTC+1)	Mijatović 18'; Jugović (yellow card) 36'; Mihajlović (yellow card) 44'; Jokanović (yellow card) 55'; Brnović (yellow card) 88'	Report	Nedvěd (yellow card) 74'; Šmicer (yellow card) 82'	Stadium: Red Star Stadium; Attendance: 46,577; Referee: Dick Jol (Netherlands)

14 December 1996 1998 FIFA World Cup qualifying Group 6	Spain	2–0	FR Yugoslavia	Valencia, Spain
21:30 (UTC+1)	Guardiola 19' (pen.); Raúl 37'; Alkorta (yellow card) 47'	Report	Stojković (yellow card) 80'	Stadium: Estadio Mestalla; Attendance: 37,000; Referee: Serge Muhmenthaler (Switzerland)

28 December 1996 International friendly	Argentina	2–3	FR Yugoslavia	Mar del Plata, Argentina
	Esnáider 42' (pen.); Morales 61'	Report	Drulović 24'; Govedarica 56'; Jovičić 78'	Stadium: Estadio 13 de Julio; Attendance: 19,683; Referee: Ángel Osvaldo Sánches (Argentina)

=== 1997 ===
2 February 1997 1997 Lunar New Year Cup	Russia	1–1 (6–5 p)	FR Yugoslavia	Hong Kong
	Popov 62'	Report	Drobnjak 31'	Stadium: Hong Kong Stadium; Attendance: 25,530; Referee: Hugh Dallas (Scotland)
	Penalties
	Simutenkov (penalty scored); Tikhonov (penalty scored); Alenichev (penalty scored); Popov (penalty scored); Bokov (penalty scored); Kharlachyov (penalty scored)		(penalty scored) Mihajlović; (penalty scored) Savićević; (penalty scored) Drobnjak; (penalty scored) Ćurčić; (penalty scored) Mirković; (penalty missed) Govedarica

10 February 1997 1997 Lunar New Year Cup	Hong Kong League XI	1–3	FR Yugoslavia	Hong Kong
	Silva 60'	Report	Milošević 6'; Drobnjak 16', 31'	Stadium: Hong Kong Stadium; Attendance: 18,000; Referee: Leiff Sundell (Sweden)

12 March 1997 International friendly	FR Yugoslavia	0–0	Russia	Belgrade, Yugoslavia
		Report		Stadium: Red Star Stadium; Attendance: 10,486; Referee: Krste Danilovski (Macedonia)

2 April 1997 1998 FIFA World Cup qualifying Group 6	Czech Republic	1–2	FR Yugoslavia	Prague, Czech Republic
20:15 (UTC+2	Bejbl (yellow card) 44' (goal) 75'	Report	Nađ (yellow card) 16'; Mijatović 28'; Jugović (yellow card) 32'; Savićević (yellow card) 40'; Jokanović (yellow card) 80'; Milošević 90'	Stadium: Stadion Letná; Attendance: 17,137; Referee: Marc Batta (France)

30 April 1997 1998 FIFA World Cup qualifying Group 6	FR Yugoslavia	1–1	Spain	Belgrade, Yugoslavia
18:15 (UTC+2)	Mirković (yellow card) 7'; Mihajlović (yellow card) 71'; Mijatović 85' (pen.)	Report	Hierro (yellow card) 15' (goal) 18' (pen.); Alfonso (yellow card) 50'; Alkorta (yellow card) 69'; Luis Enrique (yellow card) 71'; Juanma López (yellow card) 89'	Stadium: Red Star Stadium; Attendance: 49,253; Referee: Rune Pedersen (Norway)

8 June 1997 1998 FIFA World Cup qualifying Group 6	FR Yugoslavia	2–0	Slovakia	Belgrade, Yugoslavia
20:00 (UTC+2)	Savićević 17'; Đorović (yellow card) 22'; Mijatović 75'	Report	Zeman (yellow card) 56'	Stadium: Red Star Stadium; Attendance: 22,044; Referee: Peter Mikkelsen (Denmark)

12 June 1997 1997 Korea Cup	FR Yugoslavia	3–1	Ghana	Seoul, South Korea
17:00 (UTC+9)	Jokanović 57' (pen.); Bogdanović 68', 90'	Report	R. Boateng 56'	Stadium: Olympic Stadium; Attendance: 28,830; Referee: Ahn Bong-Ki (South Korea)

14 June 1997 1997 Korea Cup	Egypt	0–0	FR Yugoslavia	Suwon, South Korea
19:00 (UTC+9)		Report		Stadium: Suwon Civil Stadium; Attendance: 7,329; Referee: Kwon Jong-Cheol (South Korea)

16 June 1997 1997 Korea Cup	South Korea	1–1	FR Yugoslavia	Seoul, South Korea
19:00 (UTC+9)	Seo Jung-Won 36'	Report	Jokanović 59' (pen.)	Stadium: Olympic Stadium; Attendance: 21,563; Referee: Selearajen Subramaniam (Malaysia)

20 August 1997 International friendly	Russia	0–1	FR Yugoslavia	St. Petersburg, Russia
		Report	Jokanović 86' (pen.)	Stadium: Petrovsky Stadium; Attendance: 9,000; Referee: Mikko Vourela (Finland)

10 September 1997 1998 FIFA World Cup qualifying Group 6	Slovakia	1–1	FR Yugoslavia	Bratislava, Slovakia
20:15 (UTC+2)	Majoroš 65'; Zvara (yellow card) 78'	Report	Nađ (yellow card) 34'; Mirković (yellow card) 59'; Mihajlović 80'	Stadium: Tehelné pole Attendance: 22,500; Referee: Anders Frisk (Sweden)

11 October 1997 1998 FIFA World Cup qualifying Group 6	Malta	0–5	FR Yugoslavia	Ta'Qali, Malta
18:00 (UTC+2)	Agius (yellow card) 35'; Zahra (yellow card) 40'; Chetcuti (yellow card) 88'	Report	Milošević 9' (yellow card) 36'; Mihajlović 34'; Savićević 44'; Mijatović 55'; Jugović 77'	Stadium: National Stadium; Attendance: 1,107; Referee: Dermot Gallagher (England)

29 October 1997 1998 FIFA World Cup qualifying Playoffs	Hungary	1–7	FR Yugoslavia	Budapest, Hungary
20:00 (UTC+2)	Illés 88'	Report	Brnović 2'; Đukić 6'; Savićević 10'; Mijatović 26', 41', 51'; Milošević 68'	Stadium: Stadion Albert Flórián; Attendance: 13,175; Referee: Vítor Melo Pereira (Portugal)

15 November 1997 1998 FIFA World Cup qualifying Playoffs	FR Yugoslavia	5–0	Hungary	Belgrade, Yugoslavia
17:00 (UTC+1)	Milošević 17'; Mijatović 44', 45' (pen.), 71', 88'; Drulović (yellow card) 73'	Report	Keresztúri (yellow card) 40'; Kuttor (yellow card) 42'; Urbán (yellow card) 43'	Stadium: Red Star Stadium; Attendance: 48,498; Referee: Metin Tokat (Turkey)

27 December 1997 Friendly unofficial match	Basque Country	3–1	FR Yugoslavia	Bilbao, Spain
20:30 CET	Guerrero 47', 69', 83'	Report	Stevic 79'	Stadium: San Mamés; Attendance: 30,000; Referee: Miguel Angel Pérez Lasa

=== 1998 ===
28 January 1998 International friendly	Tunisia	0–3	FR Yugoslavia	Tunis, Tunisia
		Report	Brnović 6'; Jokanović 74', 79'	Stadium: Stade El Menzah; Attendance: 15,000; Referee: Salmi Ossacci (Algeria)

25 February 1998 International friendly	Argentina	3–1	FR Yugoslavia	Mar del Plata, Argentina
	Crespo 45', 67', 90'	Report	Drobnjak 78'	Stadium: Estadio Parque Municipal; Attendance: 35,000; Referee: Ubaldo Aquino Valencio (Paraguay)

25 March 1998 International friendly	Colombia	0–0	FR Yugoslavia	Bogotá, Colombia
		Report		Stadium: Estadio El Campín; Attendance: 45,000; Referee: Byron Moreno (Paraguay)

22 April 1998 International friendly	FR Yugoslavia	3–1	South Korea	Belgrade, Yugoslavia
	Stanković 47', 57'; Jokanović 63'	Report	Sun-Hong 14'	Stadium: Red Star Stadium; Attendance: 9,731; Referee: Constantin Zotta (Romania)

29 May 1998 International friendly	FR Yugoslavia	3–0	Nigeria	Belgrade, Yugoslavia
	Milošević 45'; Mijatović 61'; Kovačević 72'	Report		Stadium: Red Star Stadium; Attendance: 47,810; Referee: Vančo Kocev (Macedonia)

3 June 1998 International friendly	FR Yugoslavia	1–0	Japan	Lausanne, Switzerland
	Mihajlović 71'	Report		Stadium: Stade Olympique de la Pontaise; Attendance: 5,000; Referee: Dominique Savell (Switzerland)

6 June 1998 International friendly	Switzerland	1–1	FR Yugoslavia	Basel, Switzerland
	Müller 83'	Report	Brnović 4'	Stadium: St. Jakob Stadium; Attendance: 24,000; Referee: Juan Manuel Arceo Brito (Spain)

14 June 1998 1998 FIFA World Cup Group F	FR Yugoslavia	1–0	Iran	Saint-Étienne, France
17:30	Petrović (yellow card) 42'; Stojković (yellow card) 60'; Mihajlović 73'	Report		Stadium: Stade Geoffroy-Guichard; Attendance: 30,600; Referee: Alberto Tejada (Peru)

21 June 1998 1998 FIFA World Cup Group F	Germany	2–2	FR Yugoslavia	Lens, France
14:30	Mihajlović 72' (o.g.); Matthäus (yellow card) 75'; Bierhoff 78'	Report	Mijatović 13'; Stojković 52'	Stadium: Stade Félix-Bollaert; Attendance: 38,100; Referee: Kim Milton Nielsen (Denmark)

25 June 1998 1998 FIFA World Cup Group F	United States	0–1	FR Yugoslavia	Nantes, France
21:00	Reyna (yellow card) 13'	Report	Komljenović 3'; Stanković (yellow card) 41'; Ognjenović (yellow card) 61'	Stadium: Stade de la Beaujoire; Attendance: 35,500; Referee: Gamal Al-Ghandour (Egypt)

29 June 1998 1998 FIFA World Cup Round of 16	Netherlands	2–1	FR Yugoslavia	Toulouse, France
21:00	Bergkamp 38'; Davids 90+2'	Report	Stojković (yellow card) 38'; Komljenović 48'; Mijatović (penalty missed) 50'; Mirković (yellow card) 52'; Đorović (yellow card) 73'	Stadium: Stade de Toulouse; Attendance: 33,500; Referee: José María García-Aranda (Spain)

2 September 1998 International friendly	FR Yugoslavia	1–1	Switzerland	Niš, Yugoslavia
	Stanković 51'	Report	Sesa 58'	Stadium: Čair Stadium; Attendance: 16,000; Referee: Stefan Ormandzhiev (Bulgaria)

23 September 1998 International friendly	Brazil	1–1	FR Yugoslavia	Sao Luis, Brazil
	Marcelinho 17'	Report	Milošević 8'	Stadium: Estádio Governador João Castelo; Attendance: 91,966; Referee: Sidrak Marinho (Brazil)

18 November 1998 UEFA Euro 2000 qualifying Group 8	FR Yugoslavia	1–0	Republic of Ireland	Belgrade, Yugoslavia
20:00 (UTC+1)	Đukić (yellow card) 44'; Jokanović (yellow card) 48'; Mijatović 64'	Report UEFA) Report		Stadium: Red Star Stadium; Attendance: 28,250; Referee: Karl-Erik Nilsson (Sweden)

23 December 1998 International friendly	Israel	2–0	FR Yugoslavia	Ramat Gan, Israel
	Tal 57'; Abukasis 82'	Report		Stadium: Ramat Gan Stadium; Attendance: 11,000; Referee: Muhittin Boşat (Turkey)

=== 1999 ===
10 February 1999 UEFA Euro 2000 qualifying Group 8	Malta	0–3	FR Yugoslavia	Ta' Qali, Malta
15:00 (UTC+1)	Buttigieg (yellow card) 39'	Report	Nađ 22', 55'; Mirković (yellow card) 37'; Milošević 90+1'	Stadium: National Stadium; Attendance: 5,167; Referee: Pascal Garibian (France)

8 June 1999 UEFA Euro 2000 qualifying Group 8	FR Yugoslavia	4–1	Malta	Thessaloniki, Greece
20:15 (UTC+2)	Saveljić (yellow card) 17'; Mijatović 34'; Milošević 48', 90'; Kovačević 74'	Report	Saliba 6'; Chetcuti (yellow card) 17'; Busuttil (yellow card) 60'; Buttigieg (yellow card) 86'	Stadium: Toumba Stadium; Attendance: 5,000; Referee: Morgan Norman (Sweden)
Note: Played at neutral ground due to the Kosovo War.

18 August 1999 UEFA Euro 2000 qualifying Group 8	FR Yugoslavia	0–0	Croatia	Belgrade, Yugoslavia
20:30 (UTC+2)	Mirković (yellow card) 21'; Jokanović (yellow card) 58'	Report	Boban (yellow card) 3'; Jarni (yellow card) 9'; Jurčić (yellow card) 78'	Stadium: Red Star Stadium; Attendance: 48,282; Referee: Kim Milton Nielsen (Denmark)

1 September 1999 UEFA Euro 2000 qualifying Group 8	Republic of Ireland	2–1	FR Yugoslavia	Dublin, Ireland
19:30 (UTC+1)	Keane 53'; Kennedy 73'	Report	Stanković 59'	Stadium: Lansdowne Road; Attendance: 31,400; Referee: Pierluigi Collina (Italy)

5 September 1999 UEFA Euro 2000 qualifying Group 8	FR Yugoslavia	3–1	Macedonia	Belgrade, Yugoslavia
20:15 (UTC+2)	Saveljić (yellow card) 25'; Stojković 36', 54'; Savićević 77'; Kovačević (yellow card) 90'	Report	Ćirić 64' (pen.); Serafimovski (yellow card) 68'	Stadium: Partizan Stadium; Attendance: 20,000; Referee: Anders Frisk (Sweden)

8 September 1999 UEFA Euro 2000 qualifying Group 8	Macedonia	2–4	FR Yugoslavia	Skopje, Macedonia
16:30 (UTC+2)	Jovanovski (yellow card) 52'; Šakiri (yellow card) 53' (goal) 58'; Ćirić 86'	Report	Milošević 1'; Babunski 4' (o.g.); Stanković 14'; Drulović 38'; Komljenović (yellow card) 67'	Stadium: Gradski Stadion; Attendance: 14,000; Referee: Ľuboš Micheľ (Slovakia)

9 October 1999 UEFA Euro 2000 qualifying Group 8	Croatia	2–2	FR Yugoslavia	Zagreb, Croatia
19:30 (UTC+2)	Bokšić 20'; Soldo (yellow card) 29'; Stanić (yellow card) 37' (goal) 47'; Tudor (yellow card) 48'; Jurić (yellow card) 87'	Report	Mijatović 25'; Stanković 31'; Mihajlović (yellow card) 32'; Jokanović (yellow card) 36'; Mirković (red card) 41'	Stadium: Stadion Maksimir; Attendance: 38,743; Referee: José María García-Aranda (Spain)

=== 2000 ===
23 February 2000 International friendly	Macedonia	1–2	FR Yugoslavia	Skopje, Macedonia
	Stojanovski 78'	Report	Mijatović 20', 38'	Stadium: Gradski Stadion; Attendance: 8,000; Referee: Atanas Uzunov (Bulgaria)

28 March 2000 International friendly	FR Yugoslavia	1–0	China	Belgrade, Yugoslavia
	Mijatović 8'	Report		Stadium: Partizan Stadium; Attendance: 6,565; Referee: Sándor Puhl (Hungary)

25 May 2000 International friendly	China	0–2	FR Yugoslavia	Beijing, China
		Report	Kežman 21'; Kovačević 73'	Stadium: Workers Stadium; Attendance: 49,158; Referee: Sang-Goo Park (South Korea)

28 May 2000 International friendly	South Korea	0–0	FR Yugoslavia	Seoul, South Korea
		Report		Stadium: Olympic Stadium; Attendance: 35,500

30 May 2000 International friendly	South Korea	0–0	FR Yugoslavia	Seongnam, South Korea
		Report		Stadium: Seongnam Sports Complex; Attendance: 26,500

3 June 2000 Friendly unofficial match	Hong Kong League XI	4–2	FR Yugoslavia	Hong Kong
	Gavrilović 10', 25'; Chung 26'; Lee 70'	Report	Kežman 65'; Mihajlović 90'	Stadium: Hong Kong Stadium; Attendance: 6,000

13 June 2000 UEFA Euro 2000 Group C	FR Yugoslavia	3–3	Slovenia	Charleroi, Belgium
20:45	Mihajlović (yellow card) 56' (yellow-red card) 60'; Milošević 67', 73'; Drulović 70'	Report	Zahovič 23', 57'; Milanič (yellow card) 32'; Pavlin 52'	Stadium: Stade du Pays de Charleroi; Attendance: 18,500; Referee: Vítor Melo Pereira (Portugal)

18 June 2000 UEFA Euro 2000 Group C	Norway	0–1	FR Yugoslavia	Liège, Belgium
20:45	Mykland (yellow card) 31'; Bakke (yellow card) 66'	Report	Milošević 8'; Jokanović (yellow card) 28'; Jugović (yellow card) 81'; Drulović (yellow card) 81'; Kežman (red card) 88'; Govedarica (yellow card) 90+2'	Stadium: Stade Maurice Dufrasne; Attendance: 28,750; Referee: Hugh Dallas (Scotland)

21 June 2000 UEFA Euro 2000 Group C	FR Yugoslavia	3–4	Spain	Bruges, Belgium
20:45	Komljenović (yellow card) 27' (goal) 75'; Milošević 30'; J. Stanković (yellow card) 45'; Govedarica 50'; Stojković (yellow card) 56'; Jokanović (red card) 63'; Saveljić (yellow card) 87'	Report	Alfonso 38', 90+5'; Munitis 51'; Sergi (yellow card) 62'; Mendieta 90+4' (pen.)	Stadium: Jan Breydel Stadium; Attendance: 26,611; Referee: Gilles Veissière (France)

25 June 2000 UEFA Euro 2000 Quarter-finals	Netherlands	6–1	FR Yugoslavia	Rotterdam, Netherlands
18:00	Kluivert 24', 38', 54'; Bosvelt (yellow card) 48'; Govedarica 51' (o.g.); Overmars 78', 90+1'	Report	Milošević 90+2'	Stadium: Feijenoord Stadion; Attendance: 44,000; Referee: José María García-Aranda (Spain)

16 August 2000 International friendly	Northern Ireland	1–2	FR Yugoslavia	Belfast, Northern Ireland
	Healy 45'	Report	Kežman 63'; Mijatović 78'	Stadium: Windsor Park; Attendance: 10,000; Referee: William Young (Scotland)

3 September 2000 2002 FIFA World Cup qualifying Group 1	Luxembourg	0–2	FR Yugoslavia	Luxembourg, Luxembourg
	Funck (yellow card) 56'; Schneider (yellow card) 82'	Report	Milošević 3'; Jokanović 25'	Stadium: Stade Josy Barthel; Attendance: 3,305; Referee: Sergey Shmolik (Belarus)

15 November 2000 International friendly	Romania	2–1	FR Yugoslavia	Bucharest, Romania
	Şerban 3'; Bărcăuan 89'	Report	Mihajlović 87'	Stadium: Stadionul Steaua; Attendance: 4,000; Referee: Mustafa Çulcu (Turkey)

13 December 2000 International friendly	Greece	1–1	FR Yugoslavia	Xanthi, Greece
	Vokolos 86'	Report	Basinas 9' (o.g.)	Stadium: Municipal Stadium; Attendance: 2,100; Referee: Metin Tokat (Turkey)

=== 2001 ===
14 January 2001 Millennium Super Soccer Cup	FR Yugoslavia	1–1	Bosnia and Herzegovina	Cochin, India
	Petković 85'	Report	Bešlija 75'	Stadium: Jawaharlal Nehru Stadium; Attendance: 10,000

14 January 2001 Millennium Super Soccer Cup	FR Yugoslavia	4–1	Bangladesh	Cochin, India
	Ilić 18', 34'; Rašović 81'; Trobok 88'	Report	Titu 5'	Stadium: Jawaharlal Nehru Stadium; Attendance: 5,000; Referee: Michael Andrews (India)

20 January 2001 Millennium Super Soccer Cup	FR Yugoslavia	2–0	Romania	Margao, India
	Ilić 32'; Bogdanović 43'	Report		Stadium: Fatorda Stadium; Attendance: 15,000; Referee: Sundarraj Balu (India)

23 January 2001 Millennium Super Soccer Cup	FR Yugoslavia	1–0	Japan	Calcutta, India
	Duljaj 5'	Report		Stadium: Salt Lake Stadium; Attendance: 15,000

25 January 2001 Millennium Super Soccer Cup	FR Yugoslavia	2–0	Bosnia and Herzegovina	Calcutta, India
	Duljaj 6'; Bogdanović 45'	Report		Stadium: Salt Lake Stadium; Attendance: 45,000; Referee: Rungkly Mangkol (Thailand)

24 March 2001 2002 FIFA World Cup qualifying Group 1	FR Yugoslavia	1–1	Switzerland	Belgrade, Yugoslavia
20:15	Mihajlović 68'; Jugović (yellow card) 76'	Report	Henchoz (yellow card) 17'; Chapuisat 84'	Stadium: Partizan Stadium; Attendance: 30,000; Referee: Karl-Erik Nilsson (Sweden)

28 March 2001 2002 FIFA World Cup qualifying Group 1	Slovenia	1–1	FR Yugoslavia	Ljubljana, Slovenia
20:15 (UTC+1)	Gajser (yellow card) 26'; Čeh (yellow card) 53'; Zahovič 90+4'; Vugdalić (yellow card) 90+4'	Report	Milošević 33'; Jokanović (yellow card) 50'; P. Đorđević (yellow card) 55'; Đukić (yellow card) 81'; Krstajić (yellow card) 83'	Stadium: Stadion za Bežigradom; Attendance: 10,000; Referee: Dick Jol (Netherlands)

25 April 2001 2002 FIFA World Cup qualifying Group 1	FR Yugoslavia	0–1	Russia	Belgrade, Yugoslavia
17:00 (UTC+2)	P. Đorđević (yellow card) 78'; Jokanović (yellow card) 80'	Report	Drozdov (yellow card) 40'; Onopko (yellow card) 49'; Beschastnykh 72'	Stadium: Red Star Stadium; Attendance: 37,240; Referee: Konrad Plautz (Austria)

2 June 2001 2002 FIFA World Cup qualifying Group 1	Russia	1–1	FR Yugoslavia	Moscow, Russia
19:00 (UTC+4)	Kovtun (yellow card) 9' (goal) 25'	Report	Mijatović 32'; Đukić (yellow card) 69'; Dmitrović (yellow card) 87'	Stadium: Luzhniki Stadium; Attendance: 65,000; Referee: Herbert Fandel (Germany)

6 June 2001 2002 FIFA World Cup qualifying Group 1	Faroe Islands	0–6	FR Yugoslavia	Toftir, Faroe Islands
18:00 (UTC+1)	Hansen (yellow card) 55'	Report	Stanković 16', 49' (yellow card) 70'; Kežman 24', 82', 89'; Milošević 63'; Mijatović (yellow card) 87'	Stadium: Svangaskarð; Attendance: 4,150; Referee: Jaroslav Jara (Czech Republic)

28 June 2001 Kirin Cup	FR Yugoslavia	0–2	Paraguay	Tokyo, Japan
		Report	Cáceres 39'; Ferreira 83'	Stadium: National Olympic Stadium; Attendance: 21,213; Referee: Masayoshi Okada (Japan)

4 July 2001 Kirin Cup	Japan	1–0	FR Yugoslavia	Oita, Japan
	Inamoto 21'	Report		Stadium: Big Eye Stadium; Attendance: 38,147; Referee: Vijay Rahman (Singapore)

15 August 2001 2002 FIFA World Cup qualifying Group 1	FR Yugoslavia	2–0	Faroe Islands	Belgrade, Yugoslavia
20:15 (UTC+2)	Mihajlović 23'; Mirković (yellow card) 78'; Đukić 85'	Report	Benjaminsen (yellow card) 7'; Johannesen (yellow card) 74'; Mørkøre (yellow card) 78'; Hansen (yellow card) 87'	Stadium: Red Star Stadium; Attendance: 15,437; Referee: Jose Joao Mendes Prata (Portugal)

1 September 2001 2002 FIFA World Cup qualifying Group 1	Switzerland	1–2	FR Yugoslavia	Basel, Switzerland
20:15 (UTC+2)	Yakin 24' (yellow card) 41' (yellow-red card) 63'	Report	Mirković (yellow card) 38'; Milošević 39'; Krstajić 74'	Stadium: St. Jakob-Park; Attendance: 26,000; Referee: Claude Colombo (France)

5 September 2001 2002 FIFA World Cup qualifying Group 1	FR Yugoslavia	1–1	Slovenia	Belgrade, Yugoslavia
20:15 (UTC+2)	Jokanović (yellow card) 49'; P. Đorđević 51'; Dmitrović (yellow card) 53'; Đukić (yellow card) 87'; Gvozdenović (yellow card) 89'	Report	Milinovič 10'; Osterc (yellow card) 29'; Pavlin (yellow card) 49'; Karić (yellow card) 57'; Gajser (yellow card) 62'; Ačimovič (yellow card) 69'; Čeh (yellow card) 90'	Stadium: Partizan Stadium; Attendance: 27,000; Referee: Antonio Jesús López Nieto (Spain)

6 October 2001 2002 FIFA World Cup qualifying Group 1	FR Yugoslavia	6–2	Luxembourg	Belgrade, Yugoslavia
16:00 (UTC+2)	Jokanović 19'; Mijatović 57'; Kežman 61', 71'; Milošević 62', 68'	Report	Peters 38'; Christophe 51'	Stadium: Partizan Stadium; Attendance: 1,758; Referee: Leslie Irvine (Northern Ireland)

=== 2002 ===
13 February 2002 International friendly	FR Yugoslavia	2–1	Mexico	Phoenix, United States
	Kežman 37'; Milošević 44'	Report	Mendoza 75'	Stadium: Bank One Ball Park; Attendance: 25,000; Referee: Kevin Scott (USA)

27 March 2002 International friendly	Brazil	1–0	FR Yugoslavia	Fortaleza, Brazil
	Luisão 71'	Report		Stadium: Castelão; Attendance: 57,000; Referee: Epifanio Gonzalez Chávez (Paraguay)

17 April 2002 International friendly	FR Yugoslavia	4–1	Lithuania	Smederevo, Yugoslavia
	Ilić 16'; Kežman 36', 76'; Brnović 87'	Report	Žutautas 20'	Stadium: Smederevo Stadium; Attendance: 15,000; Referee: Delče Jakimovski (Macedonia)

8 May 2002 International friendly	Ecuador	1–0	FR Yugoslavia	East Rutherford, United States
	Delgado 20'	Report		Stadium: Giants Stadium; Attendance: 36,540; Referee: Richard Grady (USA)

17 May 2002 2002 LG Cup	Ukraine	2–0	FR Yugoslavia	Moscow, Russia
	Popov 27'; Musolitin 78'	Report		Stadium: Dynamo Stadium; Attendance: 5,000; Referee: Paulius Malzinskas (Lithuania)

19 May 2002 2002 LG Cup	Russia	1–1 (5–6 p)	FR Yugoslavia	Moscow, Russia
	Sychov 87'	Report	Kovačević 54'	Stadium: Dynamo Stadium; Attendance: 10,000; Referee: Viktor Kassai (Hungary)
	Penalties
	Karpin (penalty scored); Alenichev (penalty scored); Onopko (penalty missed); Sychev (penalty scored); Nikiforov (penalty scored); Kerzhakov (penalty scored); Kovtun (penalty missed)		(penalty missed) Pjanović; (penalty scored) Đorđević; (penalty scored) Koroman; (penalty scored) Milošević; (penalty scored) Kežman; (penalty scored) Ilić; (penalty scored) Mirković

21 August 2002 International friendly	Bosnia and Herzegovina	0–2	FR Yugoslavia	Sarajevo, Bosnia and Hercegovina
		Report	Krstajić 34'; Kovačević 42'	Stadium: Koševo City Stadium; Attendance: 12,000; Referee: Željko Širić (Croatia)

6 September 2002 International friendly	Czech Republic	5–0	FR Yugoslavia	Prague, Czech Republic
	Smicer 2'; Ujfalusi 21', 55'; Baros 51', 80'	Report		Stadium: Stadion Letná; Attendance: 5,438; Referee: Yuriy Baskakov (Russia)

12 October 2002 UEFA Euro 2004 qualifying Group 9	Italy	1–1	FR Yugoslavia	Naples, Italy
20:45 (UTC+2)	Del Piero 39'; Tommasi (yellow card) 78'	Report	Mijatović 28'; Lazetić (yellow card) 36'; Trobok (yellow card) 69'; Kovačević (yellow card) 72'	Stadium: Stadio San Paolo; Attendance: 42,661; Referee: Manuel Mejuto González (Spain)

16 October 2002 UEFA Euro 2004 qualifying Group 9	FR Yugoslavia	2–0	Finland	Belgrade, Yugoslavia
19:00 (UTC+2)	Stanković (yellow card) 8'; Vidić (yellow card) 31'; Kovačević (yellow card) 40' (goal) 56'; Mihajlović (yellow card) 48' (goal) 84' (pen.)	Report	Nurmela (yellow card) 41'; Reini (red card) 83'	Stadium: Red Star Stadium; Attendance: 30,000; Referee: Dick van Egmond (Netherlands)

20 November 2002 International friendly	France	3–0	FR Yugoslavia	Saint-Denis, France
	Carrière 12', 50'; Kapo 70'	Report		Stadium: Stade de France; Attendance: 65,000; Referee: Eduardo Iturralde Gonzales (Spain)

== Serbia and Montenegro ==
=== 2003 ===
12 February 2003 UEFA Euro 2004 qualifying Group 9	Serbia and Montenegro	2–2	Azerbaijan	Podgorica, Serbia and Montenegro
15:30 (UTC+1)	Mijatović 33' (pen.); Lazetić 52'	Report	Sadygov (yellow card) 29'; Ismayilov (yellow card) 44'; Hasanzade (yellow card) 52'; Gurbanov 58', 77'	Stadium: Podgorica City Stadium; Attendance: 7,500; Referee: Jacek Granat (Poland)

27 March 2003 International friendly	Serbia and Montenegro	1–2	Bulgaria	Kruševac, Serbia and Montenegro
	Kovačević 29'	Report	Petrov 13'; Todorov 56'	Stadium: Stadion Mladost; Attendance: 10,000; Referee: Sašo Lazarevski (Macedonia)

30 April 2003 International friendly	Germany	1–0	Serbia and Montenegro	Bremen, Germany
	Kehl 60'	Report		Stadium: Weserstadion; Attendance: 22,000; Referee: Frank de Bleeckere (Belgium)

3 June 2003 International friendly	England	2–1	Serbia and Montenegro	Leicester, England
	Gerrard 35'; Cole 83'	Report	Jestrović 45'	Stadium: Walkers Stadium; Attendance: 30,900; Referee: Paul Allaerts (Belgium)

7 June 2003 UEFA Euro 2004 qualifying Group 9	Finland	3–0	Serbia and Montenegro	Helsinki, Finland
19:00 (UTC+3)	Hyypiä 22'; Valakari (yellow card) 31'; Kolkka 45'; Forssell 56'	Report	Mihajlović (red card) 26'; Dmitrović (yellow card) 28'; Marković (yellow card) 49'	Stadium: Helsinki Olympic Stadium; Attendance: 17,343; Referee: Claude Colombo (France)

11 June 2003 UEFA Euro 2004 qualifying Group 9	Azerbaijan	2–1	Serbia and Montenegro	Baku, Azerbaijan
20:00 (UTC+5)	Kerimov (yellow card) 20'; Guliyev (yellow card) 38'; Gurbanov 88' (pen.); Ismayilov 90+1'	Report	Malbaša (yellow card) 16'; Vukić (yellow card) 23'; Bošković 28' (yellow card) 53'; Krstajić (yellow card) 69'; Mirković (yellow card) 86'	Stadium: Shafa stadium Attendance: 5,000; Referee: Knud Erik Fisker (Denmark)

20 August 2003 UEFA Euro 2004 qualifying Group 9	Serbia and Montenegro	1–0	Wales	Belgrade, Serbia and Montenegro
20:15 (UTC+2)	Vukić (yellow card) 17'; Mladenović 72'; Jevrić (yellow card) 88'; Milošević (yellow card) 90+3'	Report	Delaney (yellow card) 61'	Stadium: Red Star Stadium; Attendance: 25,000; Referee: Anders Frisk (Sweden)

10 September 2003 UEFA Euro 2004 qualifying Group 9	Serbia and Montenegro	1–1	Italy	Belgrade, Serbia and Montenegro
20:45 (UTC+2)	Mladenović (yellow card) 45'; Stefanović (yellow card) 64'; Krstajić (yellow card) 72'; Ilić 82'	Report	Inzaghi 72'; Zambrotta (yellow card) 38'; Panucci (yellow card) 78'; Del Piero (yellow card) 83'; Corradi (yellow card) 90'	Stadium: Red Star Stadium; Attendance: 30,000; Referee: Alain Hamer (Luxembourg)

11 October 2003 UEFA Euro 2004 qualifying Group 9	Wales	2–3	Serbia and Montenegro	Cardiff, Wales
19:45 (UTC+1)	Hartson 25' (pen.); Weston (yellow card) 48'; Bellamy (yellow card) 48'; Earnshaw 90+2'	Report	Vukić 4'; Bunjevčević (yellow card) 25'; Kežman (yellow card) 36'; N. Đorđević (yellow card) 37'; Kovačević (yellow card) 79'; Milošević 82'; Ljuboja 87'	Stadium: Millennium Stadium; Attendance: 72,514; Referee: Fritz Stuchlik (Austria)

16 November 2003 International friendly	Poland	4–3	Serbia and Montenegro	Płock, Poland
	Niedzielan 27'; Rasiak 30'; Kosowski 73'; Żurawski 82'	Report	Stanković 70'; Vukić 78'; Iliev 87'	Stadium: Kazimierz Górski Stadium; Attendance: 9,000; Referee: Michael Weiner (Germany)

=== 2004 ===
31 March 2004 International friendly	Serbia and Montenegro	0–1	Norway	Belgrade, Serbia and Montenegro
		Report	Andresen 75' (pen.)	Stadium: Red Star Belgrade; Attendance: 6,000; Referee: Novo Panić (Bosnia and Herzegovina)

28 April 2004 International friendly	Northern Ireland	1–1	Serbia and Montenegro	Belfast, Northern Ireland
	Quinn 17'	Report	Paunović 7'	Stadium: Windsor Park; Attendance: 14,000; Referee: Ceri Richards (Wales)

11 July 2004 Kirin Cup	Serbia and Montenegro	2–0	Slovakia	Fukuoka, Japan
	Milošević 6'; Jestrović 90'	Report		Stadium: Hakata no Mori Stadium; Attendance: 6,100; Referee: Toshimitsu Yoshida (Japan)

13 July 2004 Kirin Cup	Japan	1–0	Serbia and Montenegro	Yokohama, Japan
	Endo 48'	Report		Stadium: Yokohama International Stadium; Attendance: 57,616; Referee: Eddie Lennie (Australia)

18 August 2004 International friendly	Slovenia	1–1	Serbia and Montenegro	Ljubljana, Slovenia
	Čeh 83'	Report	Jestrović 90'	Stadium: Bežigrad Stadium; Attendance: 5,000; Referee: Tom Henning Øvrebø (Norway)

4 September 2004 2006 FIFA World Cup qualifiying Group 7	San Marino	0–3	Serbia and Montenegro	Serravalle, San Marino
20:30	Ciacci (yellow card) 73'	Report	Vukić 4'; Jestrović 15', 83'; Vidić (yellow card) 44'	Stadium: Stadio Olimpico; Attendance: 1,137; Referee: Akmalkhan Kholmatov (Kazakhstan)

9 October 2004 2006 FIFA World Cup qualifiying Group 7	Bosnia and Herzegovina	0–0	Serbia and Montenegro	Sarajevo, Bosnia and Herzegovina
20:15		Report	N. Đorđević (yellow card) 30'; Vukić (yellow card) 66'	Stadium: Asim Ferhatović Hase Stadium; Attendance: 22,440; Referee: Gilles Veissière (France)

13 October 2004 2006 FIFA World Cup qualifiying Group 7	Serbia and Montenegro	5–0	San Marino	Belgrade, Serbia and Montenegro
20:00	Milošević 35'; Stanković 45+1', 50'; Koroman 52' (yellow card) 57'; N. Brnović (yellow card) 63'; Vukić 69'	Report	Albani (yellow card) 87'	Stadium: Red Star Stadium; Attendance: 4,000; Referee: Lassin Isaksen (Faroe Islands)

17 November 2004 2006 FIFA World Cup qualifiying Group 7	Belgium	0–2	Serbia and Montenegro	Brussels, Belgium
20:15	Deschacht (yellow card) 16'; Van der Heyden (yellow card) 90'	Report	Vukić 8' (yellow card) 48'; P. Đorđević (yellow card) 34'; Kežman 60'; Duljaj (yellow card) 85'	Stadium: King Baudouin Stadium; Attendance: 28,350; Referee: Peter Fröjdfeldt (Sweden)

=== 2005 ===
9 February 2005 International friendly	Bulgaria	0–0	Serbia and Montenegro	Sofia, Bulgaria
		Report		Stadium: Vasil Levski National Stadium; Attendance: 3,000; Referee: Anton Genov (Bulgaria)

30 March 2005 2006 FIFA World Cup qualifiying Group 7	Serbia and Montenegro	0–0	Spain	Belgrade, Serbia and Montenegro
21:00	P. Đorđević (yellow card) 55'	Report	Ramos (yellow card) 54'; Albelda (yellow card) 60'	Stadium: Red Star Stadium; Attendance: 48,910; Referee: Massimo Busacca (Switzerland)

4 June 2005 2006 FIFA World Cup qualifiying Group 7	Serbia and Montenegro	0–0	Belgium	Belgrade, Serbia and Montenegro
20:15		Report	Mpenza (yellow card) 83'	Stadium: Red Star Stadium; Attendance: 16,662; Referee: Valentin Ivanov (Russia)

8 June 2005 International friendly	Serbia and Montenegro	1–1	Italy	Toronto, Canada
	Žigić 25'	Report	Lucarelli 83'	Stadium: Rogers Centre; Attendance: 22,138; Referee: Steven Depiero (Canada)

15 August 2005 Valeriy Lobanovskyi Memorial Tournament	Poland	3–2	Serbia and Montenegro	Kyiv, Ukraine
	Frankowski 30', 42' (pen.); Rasiak 40'	Report	Žigić 32'; Vidić 89'	Stadium: Valeriy Lobanovskyi Dynamo Stadium; Attendance: 4,500; Referee: Oleh Oriekhov (Ukraine)

17 August 2005 Valeriy Lobanovskyi Memorial Tournament	Ukraine	2–1	Serbia and Montenegro	Kyiv, Ukraine
	Rebrov 61'; Nazarenko 72'	Report	Kežman 90'	Stadium: Valeriy Lobanovskyi Dynamo Stadium; Attendance: 4,000; Referee: Tomasz Mikulski (Poland)

3 September 2005 2006 FIFA World Cup qualifiying Group 7	Serbia and Montenegro	2–0	Lithuania	Belgrade, Serbia and Montenegro
20:30	Kežman 18' (yellow card) 44'; Saša Ilić 74'	Report	Skerla (yellow card) 27'; Šemberas (yellow card) 43'	Stadium: Red Star Stadium; Attendance: 20,203; Referee: Kim Milton Nielsen (Denmark)

7 September 2005 2006 FIFA World Cup qualifiying Group 7	Spain	1–1	Serbia and Montenegro	Madrid, Spain
22:00	Raúl 19'; Xabi Alonso (yellow card) 56'; del Horno (yellow card) 68'; Marchena (yellow card) 77'	Report	Krstajić (yellow card) 58'; Koroman (yellow card) 63'; Kežman 68'; Duljaj (yellow card) 74' (yellow-red card) 90'; P. Đorđević (yellow card) 81'	Stadium: Vicente Calderón Stadium; Attendance: 22,440; Referee: Graham Poll (England)

8 October 2005 2006 FIFA World Cup qualifiying Group 7	Lithuania	0–2	Serbia and Montenegro	Vilnius, Lithuania
20:00	Česnauskis (yellow card) 63'	Report	Kežman 44'; Nađ (yellow card) 45+1'; Mladenović (yellow card) 49'; Vukić 85'; Ljuboja (yellow card) 89'	Stadium: Vėtra Stadium; Attendance: 1,500; Referee: Jan Wegereef (Netherlands)

12 October 2005 2006 FIFA World Cup qualifiying Group 7	Serbia and Montenegro	1–0	Bosnia and Herzegovina	Belgrade, Serbia and Montenegro
20:30	Kežman 7'; Koroman (yellow card) 23'; Vukić (yellow card) 60'; Vidić (yellow card) 76' (yellow-red card) 84'	Report	Milenković (yellow card) 35'; Hasagić (yellow card) 76'	Stadium: Red Star Stadium; Attendance: 46,305; Referee: Kyros Vassaras (Greece)

13 November 2005 International friendly	China	0–2	Serbia and Montenegro	Nanjing, China
		Report	Đorđević 55'; Žigić 67'	Stadium: Wutaishan Stadium; Attendance: 30,300; Referee: Jong-Gook Lee (South Korea)

16 November 2005 International friendly	South Korea	2–0	Serbia and Montenegro	Seoul, South Korea
	Choi 4'; Lee 66'	Report		Stadium: Seoul World Cup Stadium; Attendance: 40,127; Referee: Yang Zhiqiang (China)

=== 2006 ===
1 March 2006 International friendly	Tunisia	0–1	Serbia and Montenegro	Rades, Tunisia
		Report	Kežman 12'	Stadium: Stade du 7 Novembre; Attendance: 15,000; Referee: Djamel Haïmoudi (Tunisia)

27 May 2006 International friendly	Serbia and Montenegro	1–1	Uruguay	Belgrade, Serbia and Montenegro
	Stanković 18'	Report	Godin 81'	Stadium: Red Star Stadium; Attendance: 35,000; Referee: Drago Kos (Slovenia)

11 June 2006 2006 FIFA World Cup Group C	Serbia and Montenegro	0–1	Netherlands	Leipzig, Germany
15:00	Stanković (yellow card) 34'; Koroman (yellow card) 64'; Dragutinović (yellow card) 81'; Gavrančić (yellow card) 90'	Report	Robben 18'; van Bronckhorst (yellow card) 56'; Heitinga (yellow card) 85'	Stadium: Zentralstadion; Attendance: 43,000; Referee: Markus Merk (Germany)

16 June 2006 2006 FIFA World Cup Group C	Argentina	6–0	Serbia and Montenegro	Gelsenkirchen, Germany
15:00	Rodríguez 6', 41'; Cambiasso 31'; Crespo (yellow card) 36' (goal) 78'; Tevez 84'; Messi 88'	Report	Koroman (yellow card) 7'; Nađ (yellow card) 27'; Krstajić (yellow card) 42'; Kežman (red card) 65'	Stadium: FIFA WM Stadion Gelsenkirchen; Attendance: 52,000; Referee: Roberto Rosetti (Italy)

21 June 2006 2006 FIFA World Cup Group C	Ivory Coast	3–2	Serbia and Montenegro	Munich, Germany
21:00	Keïta (yellow card) 33'; Dindane 37' (pen.) (yellow card) 43' (goal) 67'; Domoraud (yellow card) 41' (yellow-red card) 90+2'; Kalou 86' (pen.)	Report	Žigić 10'; Nađ (yellow card) 17' (yellow-red card) 45+1'; Ilić 20'; Dudić (yellow card) 35'; Duljaj (yellow card) 37'; Gavrančić (yellow card) 57'	Stadium: FIFA WM Stadion München; Attendance: 66,000; Referee: Marco Rodríguez (Mexico)
Note: Last international match as Serbia and Montenegro

== See also ==
- Serbia national football team results
- Montenegro national football team results
