= 1997 Korea Cup squads =

These are the squads for the 1997 Korea Cup in South Korea, which took place from 12 to 16 June 1997. The players' listed age is their age on the tournament's opening day (12 June 1997).

== Egypt ==
Head coach: Mahmoud Al Gohary

No.	Pos.	Player	Date of birth (age)	Caps	Club
1	GK	Nader El-Sayed	13 December 1972 (aged 24)		(Egypt) Al-Zamalek
2	DF	Ibrahim Hassan	10 August 1966 (aged 30)		(Egypt) Al-Ahly
3	DF	Mohamed Youssef	9 October 1970 (aged 26)		(Egypt) Al-Ahly
4	MF	Tarek Mostafa	1 April 1971 (aged 26)		(Egypt) Al-Zamalek
5	DF	Abdel-Zaher El-Saqua	30 January 1974 (aged 23)		(Egypt) El Mansoura SC
6	DF	Mehdat Abdelhadi	12 June 1974 (aged 23)		(Egypt) Al-Zamalek
7	FW	Walid Salah Abdel Latif	11 November 1977 (aged 19)		(Egypt) El Mansoura SC
8	MF	Hesham Hanafy	2 March 1973 (aged 24)		(Egypt) Al-Ahly
9	FW	Hossam Hassan	10 August 1966 (aged 30)		(Egypt) Al-Ahly
10	FW	Mohamed Salah Abo Greisha	1 January 1970 (aged 27)		(Egypt) Ismaily
11	MF	Abdel Sattar Sabry	19 June 1974 (aged 22)		(Egypt) Al-Mokawloon al-Arab
12	MF	Hady Khashaba	19 December 1972 (aged 24)		(Egypt) Al-Ahly
14	MF	Hazem Emam	10 May 1975 (aged 22)		(Italy) Udinese Calcio
15	DF	Mohamed Sakr Tawfik	8 November 1969 (aged 27)		(Egypt) El Mansoura SC
16	GK	Essam El-Hadary	15 January 1973 (aged 24)		(Egypt) Al-Ahly
	FW	Ayman Moheb	11 March 1970 (aged 27)		(Egypt) El Mansoura SC
20		Ahmed Abdallah	26 October 1973 (aged 23)		(Egypt)

== Ghana ==
Head coach: Rinus Israël

No.	Pos.	Player	Date of birth (age)	Caps	Club
1	GK	Abubakari Tanko			(Egypt) El-Masry
2	DF	Frank Amankwah	29 December 1971 (aged 25)		(Germany) FC Gütersloh
3	MF	Kwabena Boateng	10 October 1974 (aged 22)		(Ghana) Goldfields Obuasi
4	DF	Jacob Nettey	25 January 1976 (aged 21)		(Ghana) Hearts of Oak
5	MF	Sammi Adjei	18 November 1973 (aged 23)		(Ghana) Goldfields Obuasi
6	FW	Kwame Ayew	28 December 1973 (aged 23)		(Portugal) Vitória de Setúbal
7	FW	Robert Boateng	13 July 1974 (aged 22)		(Ghana) Ashante Kotoko
8		Yaw Sakyi			(Ghana) Ashante Kotoko
9		Joseph Farneye			
10	FW	Abédi Pelé	5 November 1964 (aged 32)		(Germany) 1860 Munich
11	FW	Ebenezer Dadzie	1 June 1975 (aged 22)		(Ghana) Goldfields Obuasi
13	FW	Isaac Kuffour	30 December 1978 (aged 18)		(Ghana) Okwawu United
14	DF	Emmanuel Armah	22 April 1968 (aged 29)		(Ghana) Hearts of Oak
15	FW	Princeton Owusu-Ansah	12 August 1976 (aged 20)		(Ghana) Goldfields Obuasi
16		Simon Addo	11 December 1974 (aged 22)		Ghana Ports Authority
18		Foster Bastios			(Greece) Kalamata
	MF	Godwin Attram	7 August 1980 (aged 16)		(Ghana) Great Olympics
		Tete			

== South Korea ==
Head coach: Cha Bum-kun

No.	Pos.	Player	Date of birth (age)	Caps	Club
1	GK	Kim Bong-soo	4 December 1970 (aged 26)		(South Korea) Anyang LG Cheetahs
2	DF	Kim Sang-hoon	8 June 1973 (aged 24)		(South Korea) Ulsan Hyundai Horang-i
3	MF	Choi Sung-yong	25 December 1975 (aged 21)		(South Korea) Sangmu FC
4	DF	Choi Yoon-yeol	17 April 1974 (aged 23)		(South Korea) Ulsan Hyundai Horang-i
5	MF	Lee Min-sung	23 June 1973 (aged 23)		(South Korea) Busan Daewoo Royals
6	MF	Yoo Sang-chul	18 October 1971 (aged 25)		(South Korea) Ulsan Hyundai Horang-i
7	MF	Kim Do-keun	2 March 1972 (aged 25)		(South Korea) Jeonnam Dragons
8	MF	Jung Jae-kwon	5 November 1970 (aged 26)		(South Korea) Busan Daewoo Royals
9	DF	Park Kun-ha	25 July 1971 (aged 25)		(South Korea) Suwon Samsung Bluewings
10	FW	Choi Yong-soo	10 September 1973 (aged 23)		(South Korea) Sangmu FC
11	MF	Seo Jung-won	17 December 1970 (aged 26)		(South Korea) Anyang LG Cheetahs
12	DF	Lee Ki-hyung	28 September 1974 (aged 22)		(South Korea) Suwon Samsung Bluewings
13	DF	Kim Tae-young	8 November 1970 (aged 26)		(South Korea) Jeonnam Dragons
14	MF	Ko Jong-soo	30 October 1978 (aged 18)		(South Korea) Suwon Samsung Bluewings
15	DF	Kim Young-chul	30 June 1976 (aged 20)		(South Korea) Konkuk University
16	MF	Choi Moon-sik	6 January 1971 (aged 26)		(South Korea) Sangmu FC
17	MF	Ha Seok-ju	20 February 1968 (aged 29)		(Japan) Cerezo Osaka
18	GK	Seo Dong-myung	4 May 1974 (aged 23)		(South Korea) Ulsan Hyundai Horang-i
19	DF	Jang Dae-il	9 March 1975 (aged 22)		(South Korea) Yonsei University
21	FW	Ko Jeong-woon	27 June 1966 (aged 30)		(Japan) Cerezo Osaka

== FR Yugoslavia ==
Head coach: Slobodan Santrač

No.	Pos.	Player	Date of birth (age)	Caps	Club
1	GK	Ivica Kralj	26 March 1973 (aged 24)		(Federal Republic of Yugoslavia) Partizan
2	DF	Zoran Mirković	21 September 1971 (aged 25)		(Italy) Atalanta
3	DF	Niša Saveljić	27 March 1970 (aged 27)		(Federal Republic of Yugoslavia) Partizan
4	MF	Slaviša Jokanović	16 August 1968 (aged 28)		(Spain) Tenerife
5	DF	Miroslav Đukić	19 February 1966 (aged 31)		(Spain) Deportivo La Coruña
6	DF	Gordan Petrić	30 July 1969 (aged 27)		(Scotland) Rangers
7	DF	Željko Petrović	13 November 1965 (aged 31)		(Netherlands) PSV Eindhoven
8	MF	Albert Nađ	29 October 1974 (aged 22)		(Spain) Real Betis
9	FW	Darko Kovačević	18 November 1973 (aged 23)		(Spain) Real Sociedad
10	MF	Nenad Maslovar	20 February 1967 (aged 30)		(Japan) JEF United Ichihara
11	MF	Ljubinko Drulović	11 April 1968 (aged 29)		(Portugal) Porto
12	GK	Dragoje Leković	21 October 1967 (aged 29)		(Scotland) Kilmarnock
13	DF	Vuk Rašović	3 January 1973 (aged 24)		(Federal Republic of Yugoslavia) Rad
14	DF	Vladimir Martinović	6 April 1973 (aged 24)		(Federal Republic of Yugoslavia) Zemun
17	FW	Rade Bogdanović	21 May 1970 (aged 27)		(Japan) JEF United Ichihara
	DF	Miško Mirković	7 July 1966 (aged 30)		(Turkey) Kocaelispor
	FW	Radivoje Manic	16 January 1972 (aged 25)		(South Korea) Busan Daewoo Royals

== See also ==
- 1997 Korea Cup
