= 2002 FIFA World Cup qualification – UEFA Group 1 =

Football tournament qualification stage

The 2002 FIFA World Cup qualification UEFA Group 1 was a UEFA qualifying group for the 2002 FIFA World Cup. The group comprised Faroe Islands, Luxembourg, Russia, Slovenia, Switzerland and Yugoslavia.

The group was won by Russia, who qualified for the 2002 FIFA World Cup. The runners-up Slovenia entered the UEFA play-off stage.

== Standings ==
Pos	Team	Pld	W	D	L	GF	GA	GD	Pts	Qualification	Russia national football team	Slovenia national football team	Serbia and Montenegro national football team	Switzerland national football team	Faroe Islands national football team	Luxembourg national football team
1	Russia	10	7	2	1	18	5	+13	23	Qualification to 2002 FIFA World Cup	—	1–1	1–1	4–0	1–0	3–0
2	Slovenia	10	5	5	0	17	9	+8	20	Advance to UEFA play-offs	2–1	—	1–1	2–2	3–0	2–0
3	FR Yugoslavia	10	5	4	1	22	8	+14	19		0–1	1–1	—	1–1	2–0	6–2
4	Switzerland	10	4	2	4	18	12	+6	14		0–1	0–1	1–2	—	5–1	5–0
5	Faroe Islands	10	2	1	7	6	23	−17	7		0–3	2–2	0–6	0–1	—	1–0
6	Luxembourg	10	0	0	10	4	28	−24	0		1–2	1–2	0–2	0–3	0–2	—

== Matches ==
2 September 2000
20:15 UTC+2

Switzerland	0–1	Russia
	Report	Beschastnykh 74'

Hardturm, Zürich
Attendance: 14,550
Referee: Kim Milton Nielsen (Denmark)
3 September 2000
15:00 UTC+1

Faroe Islands	2–2	Slovenia
Arge 90'; Ø. Hansen 90+3'	Report	Udovič 25'; Osterc 87'

Svangaskarð, Toftir
Attendance: 3,200
Referee: Mikko Vuorela (Finland)
3 September 2000
18:00 UTC+2

Luxembourg	0–2	FR Yugoslavia
	Report	Milošević 4', 26'

Stade Josy Barthel, Luxembourg City
Attendance: 3,305
Referee: Sergey Shmolik (Belarus)

7 October 2000
19:15 UTC+2

Luxembourg	1–2	Slovenia
Strasser 46'	Report	Zahovič 35'; Milinovič 37'

Stade Josy Barthel, Luxembourg City
Attendance: 1,788
Referee: Michal Benes (Czech Republic)
7 October 2000
17:30 UTC+2

Switzerland	5–1	Faroe Islands
Zwyssig 26'; Fournier 35'; Türkyilmaz 42' (pen.), 44' (pen.), 53' (pen.)	Report	Petersen 4'

Hardturm, Zürich
Attendance: 9,600
Referee: Costas Kapitanis (Cyprus)

11 October 2000
19:00 UTC+4

Russia	3–0	Luxembourg
Buznikin 19'; Khokhlov 57'; Titov 90'	Report

Dynamo Stadium, Moscow
Attendance: 12,000
Referee: John Ferry (Northern Ireland)
11 October 2000
20:15 UTC+2

Slovenia	2–2	Switzerland
Šiljak 44'; Ačimovič 79'	Report	Türkyilmaz 18', 66'

Bežigrad Stadium, Ljubljana
Attendance: 6,650
Referee: Paul Durkin (England)

24 March 2001
19:00 UTC+3

Russia	1–1	Slovenia
Khokhlov 7'	Report	Knavs 21'

Luzhniki Stadium, Moscow
Attendance: 33,000
Referee: Hugh Dallas (Scotland)
24 March 2001
20:15 UTC+1

FR Yugoslavia	1–1	Switzerland
Mihajlović 68'	Report	Chapuisat 84'

Stadion FK Partizan, Belgrade
Attendance: 30,000
Referee: Karl-Erik Nilsson (Sweden)
24 March 2001
18:00 UTC+1

Luxembourg	0–2	Faroe Islands
	Report	C.H. Jacobsen 78'; Mørkøre 82'

Stade Josy Barthel, Luxembourg City
Attendance: 2,380
Referee: Attila Hanacsek (Hungary)

28 March 2001
19:00 UTC+4

Russia	1–0	Faroe Islands
Mostovoi 18'	Report

Luzhniki Stadium, Moscow
Attendance: 8,000
Referee: Leslie Irvine (Northern Ireland)
28 March 2001
20:15 UTC+2

Slovenia	1–1	FR Yugoslavia
Zahovič 90+4'	Report	Milošević 33'

Bežigrad Stadium, Ljubljana
Attendance: 9,000
Referee: Dick Jol (Netherlands)
28 March 2001
20:15 UTC+2

Switzerland	5–0	Luxembourg
Frei 9', 31', 90'; Lonfat 64'; Chapuisat 72'	Report

Hardturm, Zürich
Attendance: 8,600
Referee: Claus Bo Larsen (Denmark)

25 April 2001 (Note: Originally to be played on 7 October 2000, the match was postponed due to security concerns caused by protests in Yugoslavia.)
17:00 UTC+2

FR Yugoslavia	0–1	Russia
	Report	Beschastnykh 72'

Stadion Crvena Zvezda, Belgrade
Attendance: 37,240
Referee: Konrad Plautz (Austria)

2 June 2001
19:00 UTC+4

Russia	1–1	FR Yugoslavia
Kovtun 25'	Report	Mijatović 32'

Luzhniki Stadium, Moscow
Attendance: 65,000
Referee: Herbert Fandel (Germany)
2 June 2001
20:15 UTC+2

Slovenia	2–0	Luxembourg
Zahovič 34', 65' (pen.)	Report

Bežigrad Stadium, Ljubljana
Attendance: 4,500
Referee: Bernhard Brugger (Austria)
2 June 2001
19:15 UTC+1

Faroe Islands	0–1	Switzerland
	Report	Frei 81'

Svangaskarð, Toftir
Attendance: 3,500
Referee: Dougie McDonald (Scotland)

6 June 2001
20:00 UTC+2

Luxembourg	1–2	Russia
Schneider 49'	Report	Alenichev 16'; Semak 76'

Stade Josy Barthel, Luxembourg City
Attendance: 2,025
Referee: Jon Skjervold (Norway)
6 June 2001
20:15 UTC+2

Switzerland	0–1	Slovenia
	Report	Cimirotič 82'

St. Jakob-Park, Basel
Attendance: 26,000
Referee: Jacek Granat (Poland)
6 June 2001
18:00 UTC+1

Faroe Islands	0–6	FR Yugoslavia
	Report	Stanković 16', 49'; Kežman 24', 82', 89'; Milošević 63'

Svangaskarð, Toftir
Attendance: 4,150
Referee: Jaroslav Jara (Czech Republic)

15 August 2001 (Note: Originally to be played on 11 October 2000, the match was postponed due to security concerns caused by protests in Yugoslavia.)
20:15 UTC+2

FR Yugoslavia	2–0	Faroe Islands
Mihajlović 23'; Đukić 85'	Report

Stadion Crvena Zvezda, Belgrade
Attendance: 15,437
Referee: José Pratas (Portugal)

1 September 2001
20:15 UTC+2

Slovenia	2–1	Russia
Osterc 62'; Ačimovič 90' (pen.)	Report	Titov 72'

Bežigrad Stadium, Ljubljana
Attendance: 8,000
Referee: Graham Poll (England)
1 September 2001
20:15 UTC+2

Switzerland	1–2	FR Yugoslavia
Yakin 24'	Report	Milošević 39'; Krstajić 74'

St. Jakob-Park, Basel
Attendance: 28,190
Referee: Claude Colombo (France)
1 September 2001
17:00 UTC+1

Faroe Islands	1–0	Luxembourg
J. K. Hansen 84'	Report

Svangaskarð, Toftir
Attendance: 1,464
Referee: Željko Širić (Croatia)

5 September 2001
17:30 UTC+1

Faroe Islands	0–3	Russia
	Report	Beschastnykh 19', 29'; Shirko 88'

Tórsvøllur, Tórshavn
Attendance: 2,936
Referee: Hubert Byrne (Republic of Ireland)
5 September 2001
20:15 UTC+2

FR Yugoslavia	1–1	Slovenia
Đorđević 51'	Report	Milinovič 10'

Stadion FK Partizan, Belgrade
Attendance: 22,000
Referee: Antonio Jesús López Nieto (Spain)
5 September 2001
20:15 UTC+2

Luxembourg	0–3	Switzerland
	Report	Frei 12'; Türkyilmaz 58', 84'

Stade Josy Barthel, Luxembourg City
Attendance: 3,858
Referee: Sorin Corpodean (Romania)

6 October 2001
18:00 UTC+4

Russia	4–0	Switzerland
Beschastnykh 14' (pen.), 19', 38'; Titov 83'	Report

Dynamo Stadium, Moscow
Attendance: 22,000
Referee: Knud Erik Fisker (Denmark)
6 October 2001
16:00 UTC+2

Slovenia	3–0	Faroe Islands
Čeh 13', 30'; Tiganj 82'	Report

Bežigrad Stadium, Ljubljana
Attendance: 8,500
Referee: Georgios Kasnaferis (Greece)
6 October 2001
16:00 UTC+2

FR Yugoslavia	6–2	Luxembourg
Jokanović 19'; Mijatović 57'; Kežman 61', 71'; Milošević 62', 68'	Report	Peters 38'; Christophe 51'

Stadion FK Partizan, Belgrade
Attendance: 1,758
Referee: Leslie Irvine (Northern Ireland)

== Goalscorers ==
There were 85 goals scored in 30 matches, for an average of 2.83 goals per match.

7 goals

- (Russia) Vladimir Beschastnykh
- (Switzerland) Kubilay Türkyilmaz

6 goals

- (Federal Republic of Yugoslavia) Savo Milošević

5 goals

- (Switzerland) Alexander Frei
- (Federal Republic of Yugoslavia) Mateja Kežman

4 goals

- (Slovenia) Zlatko Zahovič

3 goals

- (Russia) Yegor Titov

2 goals

- (Russia) Dmitri Khokhlov
- (Slovenia) Milenko Ačimovič
- (Slovenia) Nastja Čeh
- (Slovenia) Željko Milinovič
- (Slovenia) Milan Osterc
- (Switzerland) Stéphane Chapuisat
- (Federal Republic of Yugoslavia) Slaviša Jokanović
- (Federal Republic of Yugoslavia) Siniša Mihajlović
- (Federal Republic of Yugoslavia) Predrag Mijatović
- (Federal Republic of Yugoslavia) Dejan Stanković

1 goal

- (Faroe Islands) Uni Arge
- (Faroe Islands) Jens Kristian Hansen
- (Faroe Islands) Øssur Hansen
- (Faroe Islands) Christian Høgni Jacobsen
- (Faroe Islands) Kurt Mørkøre
- (Faroe Islands) John Petersen
- (Luxembourg) Marcel Christophe
- (Luxembourg) René Peters
- (Luxembourg) Sacha Schneider
- (Luxembourg) Jeff Strasser
- (Russia) Dmitri Alenichev
- (Russia) Maksim Buznikin
- (Russia) Yuri Kovtun
- (Russia) Aleksandr Mostovoi
- (Russia) Sergei Semak
- (Russia) Aleksandr Shirko
- (Slovenia) Sebastjan Cimirotič
- (Slovenia) Aleksander Knavs
- (Slovenia) Ermin Šiljak
- (Slovenia) Senad Tiganj
- (Slovenia) Sašo Udovič
- (Switzerland) Sébastien Fournier
- (Switzerland) Johann Lonfat
- (Switzerland) Hakan Yakin
- (Switzerland) Marco Zwyssig
- (Federal Republic of Yugoslavia) Predrag Đorđević
- (Federal Republic of Yugoslavia) Miroslav Đukić
- (Federal Republic of Yugoslavia) Mladen Krstajić
