= Kuffour =

Kuffour is a surname. Notable people with the surname include:

- Bice Osei Kuffour (born 1981), Ghanaian hiplife musician
- Emmanuel Osei Kuffour (born 1976), Ghanaian footballer
- Isaac Kuffour (born 1978), Ghanaian footballer
- Jo Kuffour, (born 1981), English-born Ghanaian footballer
- Nana Kuffour (born 1985), Ghanaian-American soccer player
- Samuel Kuffour (born 1976), Ghanaian footballer
