= 2006 FIFA World Cup Group C =

Football tournament

Play in Group C of the 2006 FIFA World Cup began on 10 June 2006 and ended on 21 June. Argentina won the group and advanced to the round of 16, along with the Netherlands. The two sides tied on points in the standings, but Argentina won the tie-break on goal difference and ended the group in first with the Netherlands in second place. The Ivory Coast and Serbia and Montenegro failed to advance.

Upon completion of the draw for the tournament, many football pundits remarked that this group appeared to be the "group of death", despite the fact that only Argentina had qualified for the previous World Cup.

== Standings ==
Pos	Team	Pld	W	D	L	GF	GA	GD	Pts	Qualification
1	Argentina	3	2	1	0	8	1	+7	7	Advance to knockout stage
2	Netherlands	3	2	1	0	3	1	+2	7	Advance to knockout stage
3	Ivory Coast	3	1	0	2	5	6	−1	3	
4	Serbia and Montenegro	3	0	0	3	2	10	−8	0	

Source: FIFA
Rules for classification: Tie-breaking criteria
- Argentina advanced to play Mexico (runners-up of Group D) in the round of 16.
- The Netherlands advanced to play Portugal (winners of Group D) in the round of 16.

== Matches ==
All times local (CEST/UTC+2)

=== Argentina vs Ivory Coast ===
10 June 2006
21:00

Argentina	2–1	Ivory Coast
Crespo 24'; Saviola 38'		Drogba 82'

Volksparkstadion, Hamburg
Attendance: 49,480
Referee: Frank De Bleeckere (Belgium)

Argentina	Ivory Coast

GK	1	Roberto Abbondanzieri
RB	21	Nicolás Burdisso
CB	2	Roberto Ayala
CB	6	Gabriel Heinze	(yellow card) 48'
LB	3	Juan Pablo Sorín (c)
RM	18	Maxi Rodríguez
CM	8	Javier Mascherano
LM	5	Esteban Cambiasso
AM	10	Juan Román Riquelme		(substituted off) 90+3'
CF	7	Javier Saviola	(yellow card) 41'	(substituted off) 75'
CF	9	Hernán Crespo		(substituted off) 64'
Substitutions:
FW	14	Rodrigo Palacio		(substituted on) 64'
MF	22	Lucho González	(yellow card) 81'	(substituted on) 75'
MF	16	Pablo Aimar		(substituted on) 90+3'
Manager:
José Pékerman

GK	1	Jean-Jacques Tizié
RB	21	Emmanuel Eboué	(yellow card) 62'
CB	4	Kolo Touré
CB	12	Abdoulaye Méïté
LB	3	Arthur Boka
CM	19	Yaya Touré
CM	5	Didier Zokora
RW	18	Abdul Kader Keïta		(substituted off) 77'
AM	8	Bonaventure Kalou		(substituted off) 55'
LW	2	Kanga Akalé		(substituted off) 62'
CF	11	Didier Drogba (c)	(yellow card) 90+1'
Substitutions:
FW	15	Aruna Dindane		(substituted on) 55'
FW	14	Bakari Koné		(substituted on) 62'
FW	9	Arouna Koné		(substituted on) 77'
Manager:
(France) Henri Michel

Man of the Match:
Javier Saviola (Argentina)

Assistant referees:
Peter Hermans (Belgium)
Walter Vromans (Belgium)
Fourth official:
Éric Poulat (France)
Fifth official:
Vincent Texier (France)

=== Serbia and Montenegro vs Netherlands ===
11 June 2006
15:00

Serbia and Montenegro	0–1	Netherlands
		Robben 18'

Zentralstadion, Leipzig
Attendance: 43,000
Referee: Markus Merk (Germany)

Serbia and Montenegro	Netherlands

GK	1	Dragoslav Jevrić
RB	14	Nenad Đorđević		(substituted off) 43'
CB	6	Goran Gavrančić	(yellow card) 90'
CB	20	Mladen Krstajić
LB	3	Ivica Dragutinović	(yellow card) 81'
RM	10	Dejan Stanković	(yellow card) 34'
CM	4	Igor Duljaj
CM	17	Albert Nađ
LM	11	Predrag Đorđević
CF	9	Savo Milošević (c)		(substituted off) 46'
CF	8	Mateja Kežman		(substituted off) 67'
Substitutions:
MF	7	Ognjen Koroman	(yellow card) 64'	(substituted on) 43'
FW	19	Nikola Žigić		(substituted on) 46'
FW	21	Danijel Ljuboja		(substituted on) 67'
Manager:
Ilija Petković

GK	1	Edwin van der Sar (c)
RB	14	John Heitinga	(yellow card) 85'
CB	13	André Ooijer
CB	4	Joris Mathijsen		(substituted off) 86'
LB	5	Giovanni van Bronckhorst	(yellow card) 56'
RM	18	Mark van Bommel		(substituted off) 60'
CM	20	Wesley Sneijder
LM	8	Phillip Cocu
RF	17	Robin van Persie
CF	9	Ruud van Nistelrooy		(substituted off) 69'
LF	11	Arjen Robben
Substitutions:
MF	6	Denny Landzaat		(substituted on) 60'
FW	7	Dirk Kuyt		(substituted on) 69'
DF	3	Khalid Boulahrouz		(substituted on) 86'
Manager:
Marco van Basten

Man of the Match:
Arjen Robben (Netherlands)

Assistant referees:
Christian Schräer (Germany)
Jan-Hendrik Salver (Germany)
Fourth official:
Mohamed Guezzaz (Morocco)
Fifth official:
Brahim Djezzar (Algeria)

=== Argentina vs Serbia and Montenegro ===
16 June 2006
15:00

Argentina	6–0	Serbia and Montenegro
Rodríguez 6', 41'; Cambiasso 31'; Crespo 78'; Tevez 84'; Messi 88'

Arena AufSchalke, Gelsenkirchen
Attendance: 52,000
Referee: Roberto Rosetti (Italy)

Argentina	Serbia and Montenegro

GK	1	Roberto Abbondanzieri
RB	21	Nicolás Burdisso
CB	2	Roberto Ayala
CB	6	Gabriel Heinze
LB	3	Juan Pablo Sorín (c)
DM	8	Javier Mascherano
RW	22	Lucho González		(substituted off) 17'
AM	10	Juan Román Riquelme
LW	18	Maxi Rodríguez		(substituted off) 75'
CF	7	Javier Saviola		(substituted off) 59'
CF	9	Hernán Crespo	(yellow card) 36'
Substitutions:
MF	5	Esteban Cambiasso		(substituted on) 17'
FW	11	Carlos Tevez		(substituted on) 59'
FW	19	Lionel Messi		(substituted on) 75'
Manager:
José Pékerman

GK	1	Dragoslav Jevrić
RB	4	Igor Duljaj
CB	6	Goran Gavrančić
CB	15	Milan Dudić
LB	20	Mladen Krstajić	(yellow card) 42'
RM	7	Ognjen Koroman	(yellow card) 7'	(substituted off) 50'
CM	17	Albert Nađ	(yellow card) 27'	(substituted off) 46'
CM	11	Predrag Đorđević
LM	10	Dejan Stanković
CF	9	Savo Milošević (c)		(substituted off) 70'
CF	8	Mateja Kežman	(red card) 65'
Substitutions:
MF	2	Ivan Ergić		(substituted on) 46'
FW	21	Danijel Ljuboja		(substituted on) 50'
MF	18	Zvonimir Vukić		(substituted on) 70'
Manager:
Ilija Petković

Man of the Match:
Juan Román Riquelme (Argentina)

Assistant referees:
Cristiano Copelli (Italy)
Alessandro Stagnoli (Italy)
Fourth official:
Essam Abd El Fatah (Egypt)
Fifth official:
Dramane Danté (Mali)

=== Netherlands vs Ivory Coast ===
16 June 2006
18:00

Netherlands	2–1	Ivory Coast
Van Persie 23'; Van Nistelrooy 27'		B. Koné 38'

Gottlieb-Daimler-Stadion, Stuttgart
Attendance: 52,000
Referee: Óscar Ruiz (Colombia)

Netherlands	Ivory Coast

GK	1	Edwin van der Sar (c)
RB	14	John Heitinga		(substituted off) 46'
CB	13	André Ooijer
CB	4	Joris Mathijsen	(yellow card) 35'
LB	5	Giovanni van Bronckhorst
RM	18	Mark van Bommel	(yellow card) 58'
CM	20	Wesley Sneijder		(substituted off) 50'
LM	8	Phillip Cocu
RF	11	Arjen Robben	(yellow card) 34'
CF	9	Ruud van Nistelrooy		(substituted off) 73'
LF	17	Robin van Persie
Substitutions:
DF	3	Khalid Boulahrouz		(substituted on) 46'
MF	10	Rafael van der Vaart		(substituted on) 50'
MF	6	Denny Landzaat	(yellow card) 90+4'	(substituted on) 73'
Manager:
Marco van Basten

GK	1	Jean-Jacques Tizié
RB	21	Emmanuel Eboué
CB	4	Kolo Touré
CB	12	Abdoulaye Méïté
LB	3	Arthur Boka	(yellow card) 66'
CM	19	Yaya Touré
CM	5	Didier Zokora	(yellow card) 25'
CM	22	Romaric		(substituted off) 62'
RF	14	Bakari Koné		(substituted off) 62'
CF	11	Didier Drogba (c)	(yellow card) 41'
LF	9	Arouna Koné		(substituted off) 73'
Substitutions:
MF	10	Gilles Yapi Yapo		(substituted on) 62'
FW	15	Aruna Dindane		(substituted on) 62'
MF	2	Kanga Akalé		(substituted on) 73'
Manager:
(France) Henri Michel

Man of the Match:
Arjen Robben (Netherlands)

Assistant referees:
José Navia (Colombia)
Fernando Tamayo (Ecuador)
Fourth official:
Marco Rodríguez (Mexico)
Fifth official:
José Luis Camargo (Mexico)

=== Netherlands vs Argentina ===
21 June 2006
21:00

Netherlands	0–0	Argentina

Waldstadion, Frankfurt
Attendance: 48,000
Referee: Luis Medina Cantalejo (Spain)

Netherlands	Argentina

GK	1	Edwin van der Sar (c)
RB	2	Kew Jaliens
CB	3	Khalid Boulahrouz
CB	13	André Ooijer	(yellow card) 42'
LB	15	Tim de Cler	(yellow card) 48'
RM	10	Rafael van der Vaart
CM	20	Wesley Sneijder		(substituted off) 86'
LM	8	Phillip Cocu
RF	17	Robin van Persie		(substituted off) 67'
CF	9	Ruud van Nistelrooy		(substituted off) 56'
LF	7	Dirk Kuyt	(yellow card) 28'
Substitutions:
FW	21	Ryan Babel		(substituted on) 56'
MF	6	Denny Landzaat		(substituted on) 67'
MF	16	Hedwiges Maduro		(substituted on) 86'
Manager:
Marco van Basten

GK	1	Roberto Abbondanzieri
RB	21	Nicolás Burdisso		(substituted off) 24'
CB	2	Roberto Ayala (c)
CB	15	Gabriel Milito
LB	17	Leandro Cufré
RM	18	Maxi Rodríguez
CM	8	Javier Mascherano	(yellow card) 90'
LM	5	Esteban Cambiasso	(yellow card) 57'
AM	10	Juan Román Riquelme		(substituted off) 80'
CF	19	Lionel Messi		(substituted off) 70'
CF	11	Carlos Tevez
Substitutions:
DF	4	Fabricio Coloccini		(substituted on) 24'
FW	20	Julio Cruz		(substituted on) 70'
MF	16	Pablo Aimar		(substituted on) 80'
Manager:
José Pékerman

Man of the Match:
Carlos Tevez (Argentina)

Assistant referees:
Victoriano Giráldez Carrasco (Spain)
Pedro Medina Hernández (Spain)
Fourth official:
Carlos Chandía (Chile)
Fifth official:
Rodrigo González (Chile)

=== Ivory Coast vs Serbia and Montenegro ===
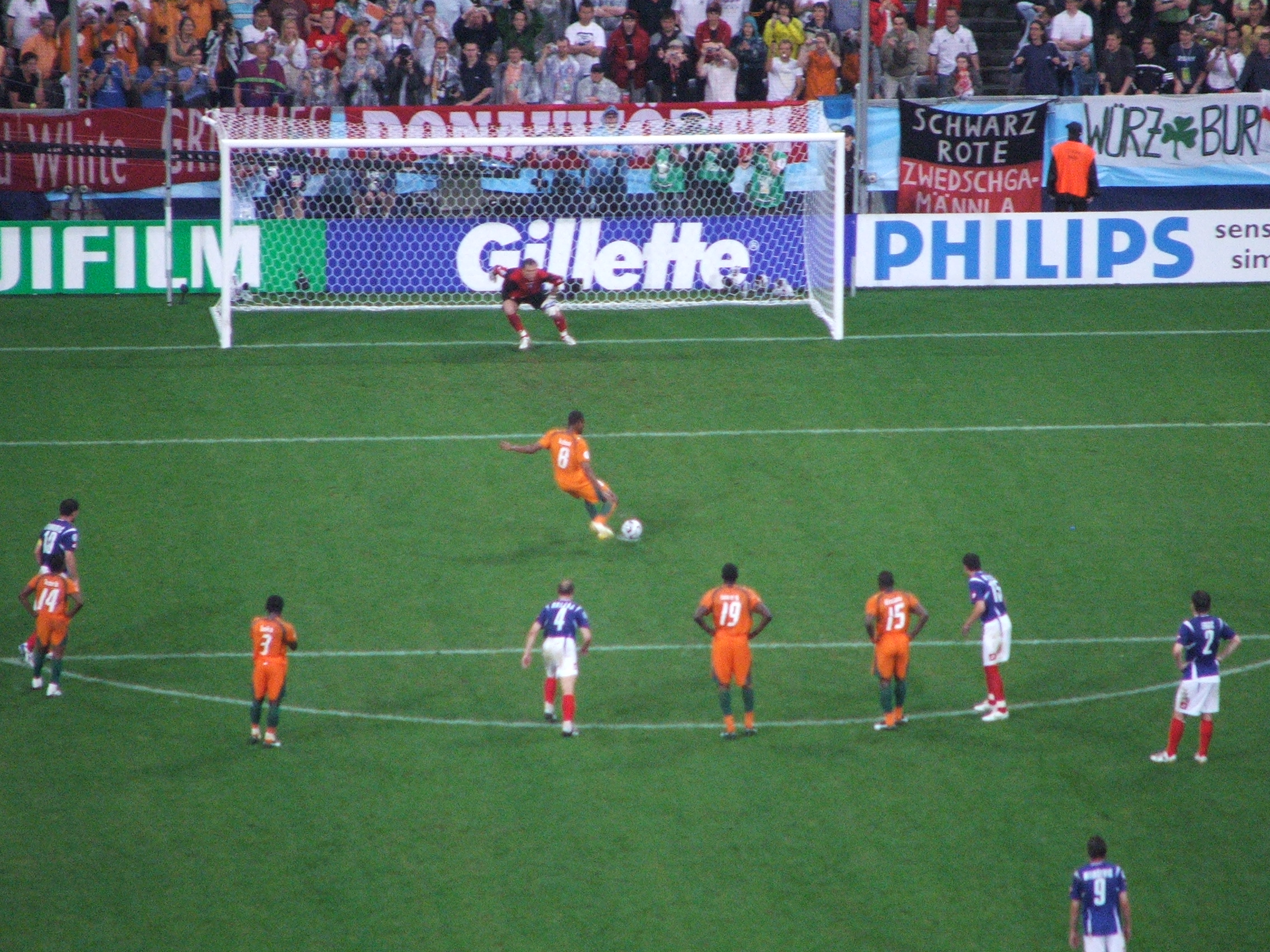
Bonaventure Kalou scored the winning goal for the Ivory Coast with a penalty kick in the 86th minute.

21 June 2006
21:00

Ivory Coast	3–2	Serbia and Montenegro
Dindane 37' (pen.), 67'; Kalou 86' (pen.)		Žigić 10'; Ilić 20'

Allianz Arena, Munich
Attendance: 66,000
Referee: Marco Rodríguez (Mexico)

Ivory Coast	Serbia and Montenegro

GK	23	Boubacar Barry
RB	21	Emmanuel Eboué
CB	6	Blaise Kouassi
CB	17	Cyril Domoraud (c)	(yellow card) 41' (yellow-red card) 90+2'
LB	3	Arthur Boka
RM	18	Abdul Kader Keïta	(yellow card) 33'	(substituted off) 73'
CM	5	Didier Zokora
CM	19	Yaya Touré
LM	2	Kanga Akalé		(substituted off) 60'
CF	15	Aruna Dindane	(yellow card) 43'
CF	9	Arouna Koné
Substitutions:
FW	14	Bakari Koné		(substituted on) 60'
FW	8	Bonaventure Kalou		(substituted on) 73'
Manager:
(France) Henri Michel

GK	1	Dragoslav Jevrić
RB	14	Nenad Đorđević
CB	6	Goran Gavrančić	(yellow card) 57'
CB	15	Milan Dudić	(yellow card) 35'
LB	20	Mladen Krstajić		(substituted off) 16'
RM	10	Dejan Stanković (c)
CM	4	Igor Duljaj	(yellow card) 37'
CM	22	Saša Ilić
CM	11	Predrag Đorđević
LM	2	Ivan Ergić
CF	19	Nikola Žigić		(substituted off) 67'
Substitutions:
MF	17	Albert Nađ	(yellow card) 17' (yellow-red card) 45+1'	(substituted on) 16'
FW	9	Savo Milošević		(substituted on) 67'
Manager:
Ilija Petković

Man of the Match:
Aruna Dindane (Ivory Coast)

Assistant referees:
José Luis Camargo (Mexico)
Leonel Leal (Costa Rica)
Fourth official:
Mohamed Guezzaz (Morocco)
Fifth official:
Brahim Djezzar (Algeria)

== See also ==
- Argentina at the FIFA World Cup
- Ivory Coast at the FIFA World Cup
- Netherlands at the FIFA World Cup
- Serbia and Montenegro at the FIFA World Cup
