= Foster Bastios =

Ghanaian footballer

Personal information
- Date of birth: 20 February 1975 (age 51)
- Height: 1.84 m (6 ft 0 in)
- Position: Defender

Senior career*
Years	Team	Apps	(Gls)
1994–1996	Cape Coast Ebusua Dwarfs		
1996–1997	Liberty Professionals		
1997–1998	Kalamata		
1999–2002	Liberty Professionals		

International career
1996–1999	Ghana	18	(0)
- * Club domestic league appearances and goals

Foster Bastios (born 20 February 1975) is a Ghanaian retired footballer who played as a defender.

He played for Ebusua Dwarfs from 1994 to 1996, then Liberty Professionals F.C. before joining Kalamata F.C. in Greece in the 1996–97 season. He played there through the 1997–98 season, then returned to Liberty Professionals where he played until 2002. He was also capped for Ghana, and was a squad member in the 1997 Korea Cup and the 1998 Africa Cup of Nations.
