= Jean-Jacques Tizié =

Ivorian footballer

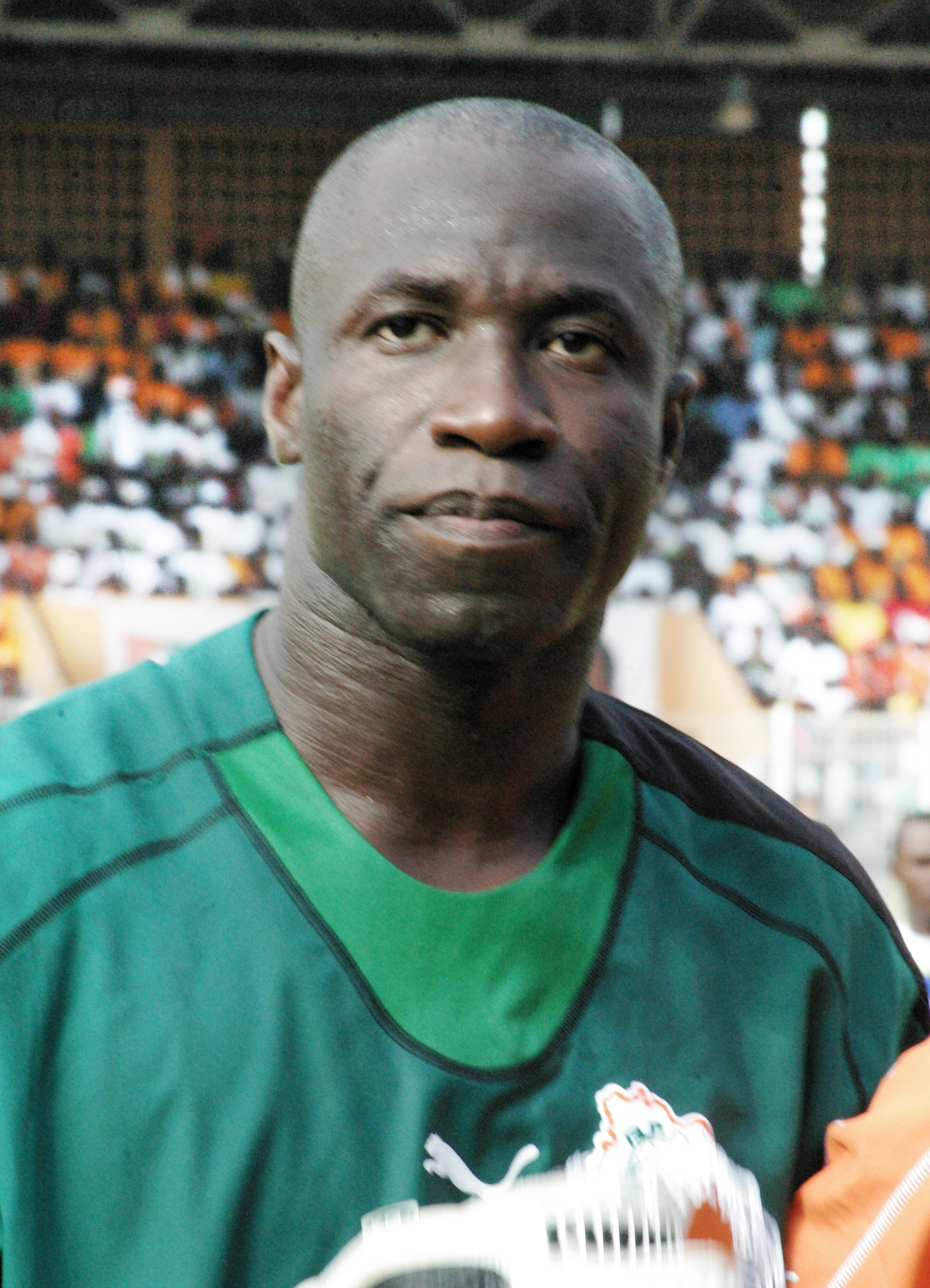

Personal information
- Full name: Jean-Jacques Tizié
- Date of birth: 7 September 1972 (age 54)
- Place of birth: Abidjan, Ivory Coast
- Height: 6 ft 1 in (1.85 m)
- Position: Goalkeeper

Senior career*
Years	Team	Apps	(Gls)
1995–1996	Stade d'Abidjan	18	(0)
1996–1999	Lazer FC	82	(0)
1999–2000	Africa Sports	28	(0)
2000–2006	Espérance de Tunis	187	(0)
2006–2007	Africa Sports	13	(0)
Total		358	(0)

International career
1995–2007	Ivory Coast	26	(0)
- * Club domestic league appearances and goals

Jean-Jacques Tizié (born 7 September 1972) is an Ivorian former professional footballer who played as a goalkeeper. He played for Espérance de Tunis from 2000 to 2006 and made 26 appearances for the Ivory Coast national football team.

== Club career ==
Tizié began his playing career with Stade d'Abidjan, before playing for Lazer FC and Africa Sports. In 1999, he won the Ivorian league title and the African Cup Winners' Cup with Africa Sports before moving to Espérance de Tunis in 2000.

He remained at Espérance until 2006, winning the Tunisian league title in 2001, 2002, 2003, 2004, and 2006, as well as the Tunisian Cup in 2006. In 2005, he suffered an injury in a collision with Étoile du Sahel forward Ogochukwu Obiakor, resulting in the loss of one of his testicles.

After leaving Espérance in 2006, Tizié returned to Africa Sports, where he ended his playing career in 2008. He subsequently worked as a goalkeeping coach, coaching youth players at Espérance de Tunis.

== International career ==
Tizié was first called up to the Ivory Coast national football team in 1995 and became the team's first-choice goalkeeper in the early 2000s.

He guarded Ivory Coast's goal during the African qualifying campaign for the 2002 FIFA World Cup and also participated in the 2006 Africa Cup of Nations. Ivory Coast reached the final of the tournament, with Tizié starting in goal during both the group stage and knockout rounds.

At the 2006 FIFA World Cup, Tizié was Ivory Coast's first-choice goalkeeper. He started two of Ivory Coast's group-stage matches, against Argentina and the Netherlands, with Ivory Coast losing both matches 2–1. He did not play in the final group-stage match against Serbia and Montenegro.
