= Ayman Moheb =

Egyptian footballer (born 1970)

Personal information
- Full name: Ayman Mohamed Moheb Abdelhamid
- Date of birth: December 1, 1970 (age 55)
- Place of birth: Mansoura, Egypt
- Height: 1.80 m (5 ft 11 in)
- Position: Forward

Youth career
- El Mansoura

Senior career*
| Years | Team | Apps | (Gls) |
| 1990–2001 | El Mansoura | | |
| 2001–2006 | Damanhour | | |

International career
| 1996–1997 | Egypt | 4 | (0) |
- * Club domestic league appearances and goals

Ayman Moheb (Arabic أيمن محب; born March 11, 1970) is an Egyptian former football striker. He was the top scorer of Egyptian Premier League (1996–97) with 17 goals playing for El Mansoura.

== International career ==
After being the top goal scorer, Moheb made some appearances for the Egypt national football team, including 1998 FIFA World Cup qualifying matches. He also played for Egypt at the 1997 Korea Cup in South Korea.

== Titles and honours ==
- Top scorer in Egyptian Premier League (1996–97) with 17 goals.
