= Ebenezer Dadzie =

Ghanaian footballer (born 1975)

Ebenezer Dadzie (born 1 June 1975) is a retired Ghanaian football striker.

He played for Goldfields Obuasi in Ghana, and was capped for Ghana. He was a squad member in the 1997 Korea Cup.
