= Isaac Kuffour =

Ghanaian footballer

Isaac Kuffour (born 30 December 1978) is a retired Ghanaian football striker.

He played for Asante Kotoko F.C. and Okwawu United in Ghana, then from 2002 to 2006 in Melaka TMFC in Malaysia. He was also capped for Ghana, and was a squad member in the 1997 Korea Cup.
