= Robert Boateng =

Ghanaian footballer

Personal information
- Full name: Robert Kwabena Boateng
- Date of birth: 3 July 1974 (age 52)
- Place of birth: Obuasi, Ashanti, Ghana
- Height: 1.74 m (5 ft 9 in)
- Position: Midfielder

Youth career
- Ashanti Gold SC

Senior career*
Years	Team	Apps	(Gls)
1995–1997	Asante Kotoko		
1997–2000	Rosenborg BK	10	(1)
2001–2003	King Faisal Babes		

International career
1997–1999	Ghana	11	(1)
- * Club domestic league appearances and goals

Robert Kwabena Boateng (born 3 July 1974) is a retired Ghanaian professional footballer. He played as a midfielder. Boateng came up through the youth teams of Glo Premier League club Ashanti Gold SC, then signed for the two times CAF Champions League winners Asante Kotoko in spring 1995. He played the 1995–1996 and 1996–1997 Glo Premier League seasons with Asante Kotoko, before signing for Norwegian giants Rosenborg BK, winning four consecutive Tippeligaen titles from 1997 to 2000 seasons, and became a member of the Ghana national football team during the period. After four years with Rosenborg BK, he then joined Glo Premier League club King Faisal Babes in 2001 and played in the 2001–2002 and 2002–2003 Glo Premier League seasons with the club.

== Club career ==
=== Early career ===
Boateng was born in Obuasi, Ashanti and began his career with Glo Premier League club Ashanti Gold SC of Glo Premier League before signing for Asante Kotoko.

=== Asante Kotoko ===
In the spring of 1995, Boateng moved to Glo Premier League club Asante Kotoko from Ashanti Gold SC and signed his first senior professional contract, before joining Tippeligaen club Rosenborg BK in 1997.

=== Rosenborg ===
In 1997, Boateng signed for Rosenborg BK in Norway for 5 million Norwegian kroner, and spent the next three seasons in the Tippeligaen with Rosenborg BK playing a total of 10 Tippeligaen matches, scoring only one goal for the team. In the 2000/2001 season he played two UEFA Champions League matches. During his time at Rosenborg BK, he was four times champion of the Tippeligaen.

=== King Faisal Babes ===
In 2000, after four years with Rosenborg BK, Boateng left the club in December 2000 and signed for Glo Premier League club King Faisal Babes. In the 2003 season of the Glo Premier League he announced his career-ending.

== International career ==
Boateng played 10 international matches whilst playing at Rosenborg BK for Ghana national team and scored one goal. Boateng was in the squad for the Black Stars in the 1997 Korea Cup.

== Personal life ==
Robert Boateng is the uncle of Kevin-Prince Boateng and Jerome Boateng.

== Career statistics ==
=== International ===
Appearances and goals by national team and year
National team	Year	Apps	Goals
Ghana	1994	1	0
Ghana	1995	–	
Ghana	1996	–	
Ghana	1997	7	1
Ghana	1998	1	0
Ghana	1999	2	0
Total		11	1

Scores and results list Ghana'a goal tally first, score column indicates score after each Boateng goal.

List of international goals scored by Robert Boateng
No.	Date	Venue	Opponent	Score	Result	Competition
1	7 April 2000	Seoul Olympic Stadium, Seoul, South Korea	FR Yugoslavia	1–0	1–3	1997 Korea Cup

== Honours ==
Rosenborg

- Tippeligaen: 1997, 1998, 1999, 2000
