= Sacha Schneider =

Luxembourgish footballer

Personal information
- Date of birth: 23 June 1972 (age 54)
- Place of birth: Luxembourg
- Position: Midfielder

Senior career*
Years	Team	Apps	(Gls)
1992–2002	CS Grevenmacher		
2002–2005	Jeunesse Esch		

International career^{‡}
1995–2003	Luxembourg	17	(1)
- * Club domestic league appearances and goals ‡ National team caps and goals as of 2 December 2013

Sacha Schneider (born 23 June 1972) is one of Luxemburger's most experienced football players. Now retired from playing.

== International career ==
He is a member of the Luxembourg national football team from 1995 to 2003.
