= Leslie Irvine (referee) =

Northern Irish football referee (born 1958)

Leslie Irvine MBE
- Born: 1957 or 1958 (age 67–68); Derry, Northern Ireland

Domestic
Years	League	Role
1978–2004	First League	Referee

International
Years	League	Role
1994–2003	FIFA listed	Referee

Leslie John Raymond Irvine MBE (born 23 June 1958 in Derry, Northern Ireland) is a former Northern Irish professional football referee. Previously working as a teacher with Limavady High School, he was a full international referee for FIFA until his retirement in 2003. He refereed four Irish Cup finals, as well as several UEFA Cup and World Cup qualifying games.

Irvine was appointed Member of the Order of the British Empire (MBE) in the 2024 New Year Honours for services to association football.
