= Marcel Christophe =

Luxembourgish footballer

Personal information
- Date of birth: 19 August 1974 (age 52)
- Height: 1.75 m (5 ft 9 in)
- Position: Forward

Senior career*
Years	Team	Apps	(Gls)
1998–2004	FC Mondercange		
2006–2008	FC Differdange 03		

International career
- Luxembourg U21
1998–2003	Luxembourg	28	(3)
- * Club domestic league appearances and goals

Marcel Christophe (born 19 August 1974) is a Luxembourgish former footballer who played as a forward.
