= Dragoslav Jevrić =

Serbian footballer (born 1974)

Dragoslav Jevrić Драгослав Јеврић
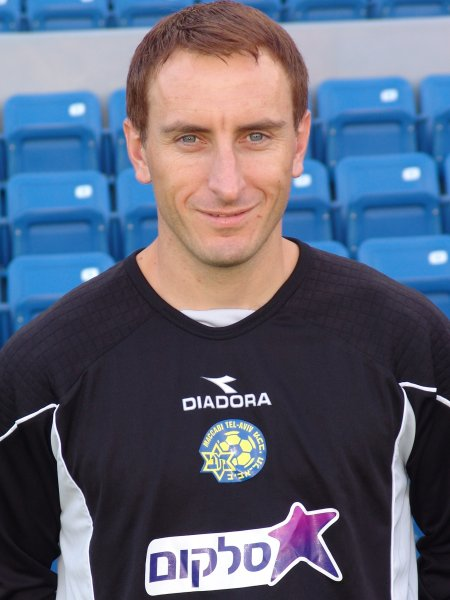
- Jevrić in 2007

Personal information
- Full name: Dragoslav Jevrić
- Date of birth: 8 July 1974 (age 52)
- Place of birth: Ivangrad, SR Montenegro, SFR Yugoslavia
- Height: 1.85 m (6 ft 1 in)
- Position: Goalkeeper

Youth career
- Ivangrad

Senior career*
| Years | Team | Apps | (Gls) |
| 1992–1993 | Rudar Pljevlja | 1 | (0) |
| 1993–1995 | Obilić | 66 | (0) |
| 1995–1999 | Red Star Belgrade | 70 | (0) |
| 1999–2005 | Vitesse | 116 | (0) |
| 2005–2007 | Ankaraspor | 50 | (0) |
| 2007–2009 | Maccabi Tel Aviv | 64 | (0) |
| 2009–2010 | Maccabi Petah Tikva | 18 | (0) |
| 2010–2012 | Omonia | 15 | (0) |
| Total | | 400 | (0) |

International career
| 2002–2006 | Serbia and Montenegro | 43 | (0) |

Managerial career
- 2015: APOEL (goalkeeper coach)
- 2022: Riga (goalkeeper coach)
- * Club domestic league appearances and goals

Dragoslav Jevrić (Serbian Cyrillic: Драгослав Јеврић, pronounced [drǎgoslaʋ jěːʋritɕ]; born 8 July 1974) is a Serbian retired professional footballer who played as a goalkeeper. He last worked as a goalkeeping coach at Riga FC.

== Club career ==
Jevrić was born in Ivangrad, SR Montenegro, SFR Yugoslavia which is now Berane, Montenegro. He started playing with FK Ivangrad, and then with FK Rudar Pljevlja and FK Priština before moving to Belgrade top-league sides FK Obilić and Red Star. He spent a large part of his career at Eredivisie side Vitesse, but left them for Ankaraspor in January 2005.

== International career ==
He was a member of Serbia and Montenegro for the 2006 FIFA World Cup. Jevrić was the only player on the team born in Montenegro as Mirko Vučinić withdrew before the tournament due to injury.

He was called up by the newly formed Serbia national team for a friendly match against the Czech Republic on 4 August 2006 but he did not play in the match as then-coach Javier Clemente chose to use Vladimir Stojković instead. This decision upset Jevrić and led him to retire from international football.

Jevrić earned a total of 43 caps His final international cap was on June 21, 2006 in a 3-2 loss against Ivory Coast in the 2006 World Cup, which was also the final match in history for the Serbia and Montenegro national team.

== Career statistics ==
=== International ===
| National team | Year | Apps | Goals |
|---|---|---|---|
| FR Yugoslavia | 2002 | 11 | 0 |
| Serbia and Montenegro | 2003 | 9 | 0 |
| Serbia and Montenegro | 2004 | 7 | 0 |
| Serbia and Montenegro | 2005 | 11 | 0 |
| Serbia and Montenegro | 2006 | 5 | 0 |
| Total | | 43 | 0 |

== Coaching career ==
In January 2022, Jevrić was appointed goalkeeping coach at Riga FC under new manager Thorsten Fink having worked with the German in the same role at APOEL.

== Honours ==
Red Star Belgrade

- FR Yugoslavia Cup (3): 1996, 1997, 1999

Maccabi Tel Aviv

- Toto Cup (1): 2008–09

Omonia

- Cypriot Cup (2): 2010–11, 2011–12
- Cypriot Super Cup (1): 2010
