= Serbia and Montenegro national football team =

1992–2006 national association football team

Serbia and Montenegro (2003–2006) FR Yugoslavia (1992–2003)
1992–2006
- Nickname(s): Plavi / Плави (The Blues)
- Association: Football Association of Serbia and Montenegro (2003–2006); Football Association of Yugoslavia (1992–2003)
- Confederation: UEFA (Europe)
- Head coach: Ilija Petković (last)
- Captain: Dejan Stanković (last)
- Most caps: Savo Milošević (101)
- Top scorer: Savo Milošević (38)
- FIFA code: SCG (2003–2006); FRY (1992–2003)
First colours	Second colours

FIFA ranking
- Highest: 6 (December 1998)
- Lowest: 101 (December 1994)

First international
- Brazil 2–0 FR Yugoslavia (Porto Alegre, Brazil; 23 December 1994) Serbia and Montenegro 2–2 Azerbaijan (Podgorica, Serbia and Montenegro; 12 February 2003)

Last international
- France 3–0 FR Yugoslavia (Saint-Denis, France; 20 November 2002) Ivory Coast 3–2 Serbia and Montenegro (Munich, Germany; 21 June 2006)

Biggest win
- Faroe Islands 1–8 FR Yugoslavia (Toftir, Faroe Islands; 6 October 1996) Serbia and Montenegro 5–0 San Marino (Belgrade, Serbia and Montenegro; 13 October 2004)

Biggest defeat
- Argentina 6–0 Serbia and Montenegro (Gelsenkirchen, Germany; 16 June 2006) Netherlands 6–1 FR Yugoslavia (Rotterdam, Netherlands; 25 June 2000); Czech Republic 5–0 FR Yugoslavia (Prague, Czech Republic; 6 September 2002)

World Cup
- Appearances: 2 (first in 1998)
- Best result: Round of 16 (1998)

European Championship
- Appearances: 1 (first in 2000)
- Best result: Quarter-finals (2000)

The Serbia and Montenegro national football team (Serbo-Croatian: Фудбалска репрезентација Србије и Црне Горе, Fudbalska reprezentacija Srbije i Crne Gore) was a national football team that represented the State Union of Serbia and Montenegro. It was controlled by the Football Association of Serbia and Montenegro. For 11 years, it was known as the FR Yugoslavia national football team (Serbo-Croatian: Фудбалска репрезентација СР Југославије, Fudbalska reprezentacija SR Jugoslavije) when the state was called the Federal Republic of Yugoslavia, until February 2003, when the name of the country was changed to Serbia and Montenegro. In 2006, Montenegro declared its separation from Serbia, with the result that the country's football team was renamed as the Serbia national football team on 28 June 2006 with the Montenegro national football team created to represent the renewed state of Montenegro.

Though politically it was not recognized as constituting a successor state to the former Yugoslavia, in regards to football, both FIFA and UEFA did consider Serbia and Montenegro to be the direct and sole successor to Yugoslavia and thus entitled to claim and use the history and records of the various Yugoslav national teams.

== History ==
=== Post-1991 ===
==== Slobodan Santrač era (1994–1998) ====
Although the Federal Republic of Yugoslavia was formed on 28 April 1992, its teams were banned from all international sporting events, including association football, due to FIFA sanctions resulting from the Yugoslav Wars. Consequently, the national team did not play its first match as a new country until 23 December 1994, a 2–0 friendly defeat to Brazil in Porto Alegre. This was the first ever team composed of Serbian and Montenegrin players exclusively, while Slobodan Santrač, a former Yugoslavia national team player, was named the team's first-ever manager. The next match was played only three days later, a 1–0 loss to Argentina in Buenos Aires.

Due to the United Nations international sanctions, the team could not take part in the 1994 FIFA World Cup qualification, nor the UEFA Euro 1996 qualifying process.

On 31 March 1995, the team recorded its first official win in history, a 1–0 friendly against Uruguay, simultaneously marking the team's first-ever home match, played at Stadion Crvena Zvezda in Belgrade, and the first ever goal scored, courtesy of Savo Milošević. Slightly more than one year later, the team recorded its first-ever win in a FIFA World Cup qualifying tournament in its first match in such a tournament, a 3–1 win over the Faroe Islands. Shortly after, the team also recorded its biggest win in history, once again against the Faroe Islands, 8–1. FR Yugoslavia finished second in Group 6, just behind Spain, meaning it had to go through the play-off system in order to qualify. FR Yugoslavia was paired up with Hungary, and what was believed would be a tough matchup turned out to be an easy win for FR Yugoslavia, 7–1 in Budapest and 5–0 in Belgrade, for an aggregate score of 12–1. This was enough to secure FR Yugoslavia's first-ever World Cup appearance as a new country.

Yugoslavia's starting XI under coach Slobodan Santrač in their 2-1 loss to the Netherlands in the final 16 of the 1998 World Cup.

The 1998 World Cup seeding had FR Yugoslavia ranked in the 21st position, but the Yugoslav national team went to France as one of the shadow favorites for the World Cup. The New York Times stated FR Yugoslavia could easily be a semi-finalist in that year's World Cup. The justification for such estimation was partially found in the names of the Yugoslav players, members of great European teams and proven footballers. Placed in Group F alongside Germany, the United States and Iran, Yugoslavia won their first match against Iran thanks to a free kick from Siniša Mihajlović, though in the next match against Germany, he scored an own goal amidst a 2–0 lead; Oliver Bierhoff equalised with only about ten minutes to spare. Nonetheless, Yugoslavia won 1–0 over the United States, placing themselves second in Group F behind Germany.

Finishing second, Yugoslavia was drawn with the Netherlands in the round of 16. Dennis Bergkamp put the Dutch in front in the 38th minute before conceding a header from Slobodan Komljenović. Predrag Mijatović could have put Yugoslavia ahead after Vladimir Jugović was fouled in the box, yet his shot hit the crossbar and the scoreline remained at 1–1. Edgar Davids then beat Ivica Kralj from 20 yards out in the dying seconds, ending Yugoslavia's World Cup campaign.

==== Euro 2000 ====
The draw for the Euro 2000 qualifiers saw many eyebrows raised as first-seeded Yugoslavia was drawn in a group alongside Croatia, marking the first matches between the two teams after the breakup of Yugoslavia. The other teams in the group were the Republic of Ireland, Macedonia and Malta. When the qualifiers began, the coach was Milan Živadinović, but in July 1999 he resigned and was replaced by Vujadin Boškov.

The team started with a 1–0 win over Ireland in Belgrade, before beating Malta 3–0 in Ta' Qali. The home fixture against the Maltese followed, but was moved to Thessaloniki, Greece, due to the NATO bombing of Yugoslavia. The team nonetheless won 4–1. The first, highly anticipated match against Croatia took place in Belgrade shortly after the bombing ended, and was interrupted due to a power outage at the beginning of the second half, resuming after 43 minutes and eventually finishing 0–0. A 2–1 defeat against Ireland in Dublin was followed by victories home and away against Macedonia (3–1 and 4–2 respectively), meaning Yugoslavia needed to win its final qualifier against Croatia in Zagreb, or to draw with Ireland failing to beat Macedonia in Skopje, in order to automatically qualify for Euro 2000. As it happened, Ireland conceded an injury-time equalizer, meaning Yugoslavia's 2–2 draw with the Croatians was sufficient for automatic qualification.

The draw for the Euro 2000 final stages placed Yugoslavia in Group C alongside Spain, Norway and another former Yugoslav republic, Slovenia. The Slovenians took a surprise 3–0 lead in the first match at the Stade du Pays de Charleroi, but three goals in six second-half minutes enabled Yugoslavia to secure a 3–3 draw. The team then beat Norway 1–0 in Liège thanks to an early Savo Milošević backheel strike. The final group match, against Spain in Bruges, saw the Yugoslavs take the lead three times, before a Gaizka Mendieta penalty and an Alfonso strike in injury-time secured a dramatic 4–3 win for the Spaniards and top spot in the group. Yugoslavia nonetheless finished second, level on points with Norway but ranked ahead due to their head-to-head victory in Liège. In each of the three matches, Yugoslavia had one player sent off: Siniša Mihajlović, Mateja Kežman and Slaviša Jokanović respectively.

In the quarter-finals, Yugoslavia was once again paired with the Netherlands. However, unlike the last encounter, the co-hosts made easy work of Yugoslavia, winning 6–1 in Rotterdam, with Patrick Kluivert scoring a hat-trick.

One of the few bright spots of Yugoslav team in the whole tournament was Savo Milošević, who finished as the joint top scorer of the tournament, alongside Patrick Kluivert. Both players scored five goals, although Milošević played one less match.

==== Failure to qualify for 2002 World Cup ====
The 2002 World Cup qualifiers marked the first time Yugoslavia failed to qualify for a major tournament ever since its return to "big stage" football after the UN sanctions. The problems began with the major political turmoil in the country as well in the Yugoslav FA, which prompted new head coach Ilija Petković to resign after only one match, a 2–0 away victory against Luxembourg.

Milovan Đorić took over the team, but under his leadership, the team managed only two draws, 1–1 at home against Switzerland and 1–1 away against Slovenia. In both matches, the opponents equalized in late stages of the match). Yugoslavia then lost 0–1 at home to Russia, marking the nation's first home defeat in official matches. After Đorić's resignation, a three-man commission consisting of Dejan Savićević, Vujadin Boškov and Ivan Ćurković took over the coaching duties, until Savićević ultimately took over on his own. The team managed to bounce back with a draw in Russia and a win in Switzerland, but failed to defeat Slovenia in the penultimate game, thus finishing their qualifying group in third position.

=== Ilija Petković era (2003–2006) ===
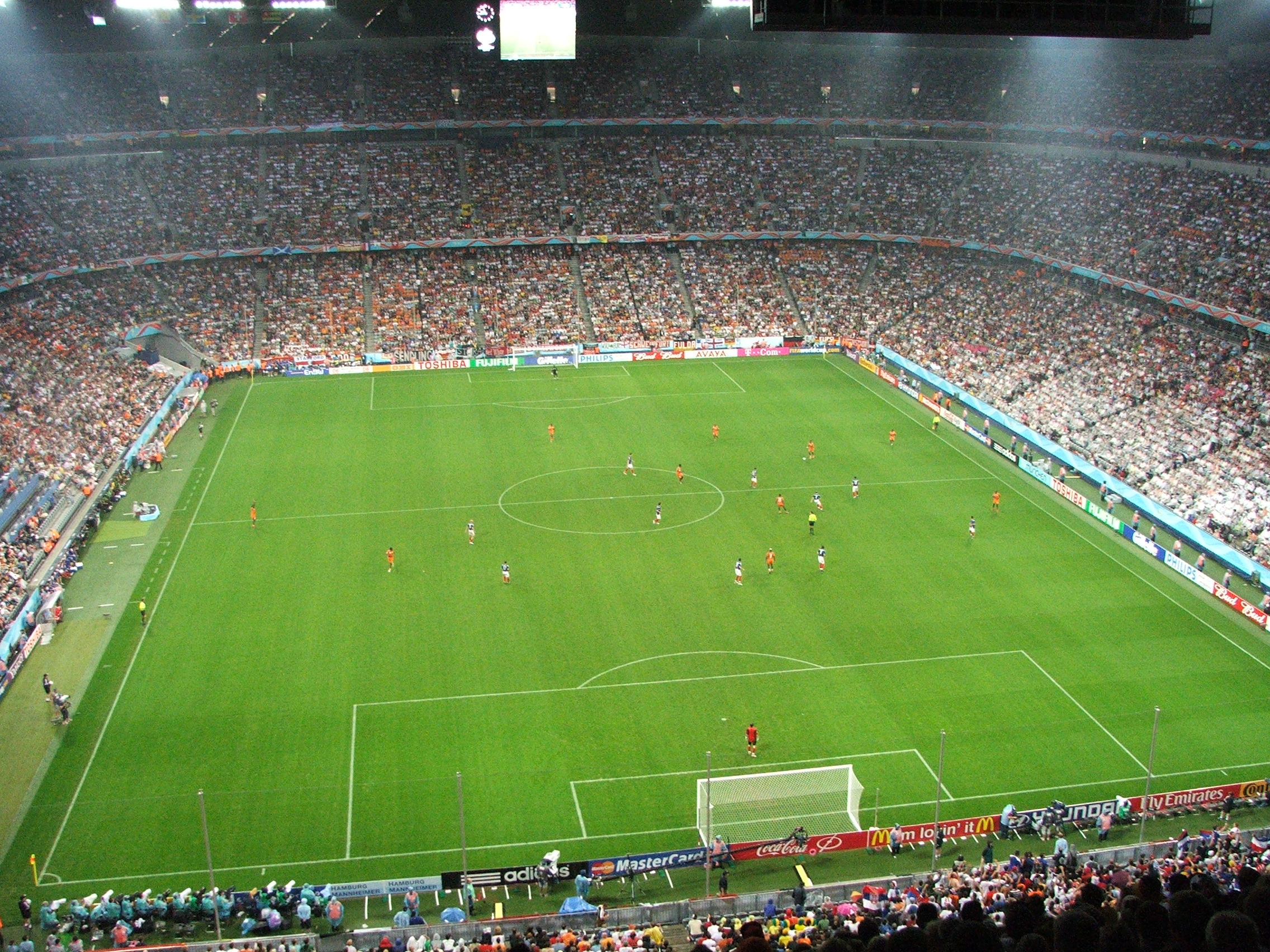
Serbia and Montenegro playing against the Ivory Coast at the Allianz Arena during the 2006 FIFA World Cup

After Savićević's disastrous spell as head coach, the country went under a political transformation, and Ilija Petković became Serbia and Montenegro's new coach. Initially, the team under his lead experienced dragging failure in the Euro 2004 qualifiers while competing for the first time as Serbia and Montenegro. Despite drawing both matches against group favourites and eventual group winners Italy, and winning both matches against group runners-up Wales, Serbia and Montenegro failed to qualify, mostly due to an embarrassing 2–2 home draw and 2–1 away loss to Azerbaijan.

However, Serbia and Montenegro qualified for the 2006 World Cup. Serbia and Montenegro began their 2006 World Cup campaign by finishing first with an undefeated record in their qualification group ahead of favourites Spain. The Serbia and Montenegro team also allowed only one goal in its ten matches, the best defensive record out all 51 teams participating in qualification. For the 2006 qualifiers, Serbia and Montenegro was drawn in a group with Spain, Belgium, Bosnia and Herzegovina, Lithuania and San Marino. Led once again by Ilija Petković, Serbia and Montenegro played some impressive defensive football: the "Famous Four" defence consisting of Nemanja Vidić, Mladen Krstajić, Goran Gavrančić and Ivica Dragutinović, with Dragoslav Jevrić as goalkeeper allowed only one goal in ten matches, finishing first in their group with a 6–4–0 record.

On 3 June 2006, following a referendum, Montenegro declared its independence from Serbia. As the World Cup was about to start, it was decided that the Serbia and Montenegro team that had qualified for the tournament would compete, with the split into separate teams representing the new countries of Montenegro and Serbia to take place once the team was eliminated from the tournament. Thus, the team played in the tournament representing a state that no longer existed. Only one Montenegrin-born player, goalkeeper Dragoslav Jevrić, was in the squad.

In the group stage of the World Cup, Serbia and Montenegro lost their opening match to joint group favourites the Netherlands 1–0, with Arjen Robben scoring the only goal of the match. They then lost their second match to Argentina 6–0, the side's worst ever international result. With the team's two losses and with Netherlands and Argentina winning both their games, Serbia and Montenegro could no longer qualify for the knockout matches, and was playing for pride alone in their final group match against the Ivory Coast, who had also been mathematically eliminated. Despite having a 2–0 lead for much of the first half, the Elephants managed to come back and win 3–2, leaving Serbia and Montenegro with a disappointing 0–0–3 World Cup run to conclude its existence.

=== After dissolution ===
A week after Serbia and Montenegro's final match against the Ivory Coast, the Football Association of Montenegro applied for separate membership to UEFA. The Football Association of Serbia was granted Serbia and Montenegro's place in UEFA and FIFA, with the new Serbia national team playing its first match in August 2006 against the Czech Republic. The Montenegro national team played its first international following admittance to UEFA against Hungary in March 2007.

=== Kit history ===
==== Kit supplier ====
Kit supplier	Period
(Germany) Adidas	1994–2001
(Italy) Lotto	2002–2006

==== FR Yugoslavia ====
1996 home	1998 WC home	1998 WC away	Euro 2000 home	2002 home	2002 away

==== Serbia and Montenegro ====
2004 Home	2004 Away	2006 WC Home	2006 WC Away

== Competitive record ==
=== FIFA World Cup ===
The following is a table of Yugoslavia's results in FIFA World Cups. Highest achievements, those in the inaugural 1930 and 1962 editions, are indicated in yellow highlight.

- 1930 to 1990 – See Yugoslavia
- 1994 – Banned because of international sanctions due to the Yugoslav wars (as FR Yugoslavia)
- 1998 – Round 2 (as FR Yugoslavia)
- 2002 – Did not qualify (as FR Yugoslavia)
- 2006 – Round 1 (as Serbia and Montenegro)

FIFA World Cup record										Qualification record					
Year	Round	Position	Pld	W	D	L	GF	GA	Squads	Pld	W	D	L	GF	GA
as FR Yugoslavia										as FR Yugoslavia					
(United States) 1994	Banned (Note: Draw for 1994 FIFA World Cup qualifiers was made on 8 December 1991, however due to break-up of SFR Yugoslavia and consequent military conflict, which broke in early 1991, FSJ ceased to exist as football organization of the SFR Yugoslavia. Organization that remained based in Belgrade, Serbia, was excluded from taking part as FSJ or its successor due to UN sanctions.)									Disqualified					
(France) 1998	Round of 16	10th	4	2	1	1	5	4	Squad	12	9	2	1	41	8
(South Korea) (Japan) 2002	Did not qualify									10	5	4	1	22	8
as Serbia and Montenegro										as Serbia and Montenegro					
(Germany) 2006	Group stage	32nd	3	0	0	3	2	10	Squad	10	6	4	0	16	1
Total	Fourth place	10/19	40	16	8	16	62	56	—	98	58	25	15	209	85

=== UEFA European Championship ===
- 1960 to 1992 – See Yugoslavia
- 1992 – Qualified, but banned because of international sanctions during Yugoslav Wars (as FR Yugoslavia)
- 1996 – Banned because of sanctions (as FR Yugoslavia)
- 2000 – Quarter-finals (as FR Yugoslavia)
- 2004 – Did not qualify (as FR Yugoslavia/Serbia and Montenegro)

=== UEFA European Championship record ===
Champions Runners-up Third place Fourth place

UEFA European Championship record										Qualifying record					
as Yugoslavia										as Yugoslavia					
Year	Round	Position	Pld	W	D	L	GF	GA	Squads	Pld	W	D	L	GF	GA
(France) 1960	Runners-up	2nd	2	1	0	1	6	6	Squad	4	2	1	1	9	4
(Francoist Spain) 1964	Did not qualify									4	2	1	1	6	5
(Italy) 1968	Runners-up	2nd	3	1	1	1	2	3	Squad	6	4	1	1	14	5
(Belgium) 1972	1/4 playoffs									8	3	4	1	7	5
(Socialist Federal Republic of Yugoslavia) 1976	Fourth place	4th	2	0	0	2	4	7	Squad	8	6	1	1	15	5
(Italy) 1980	Did not qualify									6	4	0	2	14	6
(France) 1984	Group stage	8th	3	0	0	3	2	10	Squad	6	3	2	1	12	11
(West Germany) 1988	Did not qualify									6	4	0	2	13	9
(Sweden) 1992	Banned after qualification									8	7	0	1	24	4
as FR Yugoslavia										as FR Yugoslavia					
(England) 1996	Suspended									Suspended					
(Belgium) (Netherlands) 2000	Quarter-finals	8th	4	1	1	2	8	13	Squad	8	5	2	1	18	8
as Serbia and Montenegro										as Serbia and Montenegro					
(Portugal) 2004	Did not qualify									8	3	3	2	11	11
Total	Runners-up	5/12	14	3	2	9	22	39	—	72	43	15	14	143	73

== Major competitions squads ==
=== World Cup ===
- 1998 World Cup squad
- 2006 World Cup squad

=== European Championship ===
- UEFA Euro 2000 squad

== Coaches ==
- Slobodan Santrač (1994 – July 1998)
- Milan Živadinović (August 1998 – 1999)
- Vujadin Boškov (1999 – July 2000)
- Ilija Petković (August 2000 – January 2001)
- Milovan Đorić (February 2001 – 6 May 2001)
- 3-man commission: Dejan Savićević, Vujadin Boškov and Ivan Ćurković (6 May 2001 – December 2001)
- Dejan Savićević (December 2001 – June 2003)
- Ilija Petković (July 2003 – June 2006)

== Head to head records (1994–2006) ==
Opponent	P	W	D	L
Argentina	4	1	0	3
Azerbaijan	2	0	1	1
Bangladesh	1	1	0	0
Belgium	2	1	1	0
Bosnia and Herzegovina	5	3	2	0
Brazil	3	0	1	2
Bulgaria	2	0	1	1
China	3	3	0	0
Colombia	1	0	1	0
Croatia	2	0	2	0
Czech Republic	3	2	0	1
Ecuador	1	0	0	1
El Salvador	1	1	0	0
Egypt	1	0	1	0
England	1	0	0	1
Faroe Islands	4	4	0	0
Finland	2	1	0	1
France	1	0	0	1
Germany	2	0	1	1
Ghana	1	1	0	0
Greece	2	1	1	0
Hungary	2	2	0	0
Iran	1	1	0	0
Israel	1	0	0	1
Italy	3	0	3	0
Ivory Coast	1	0	0	1
Japan	4	1	0	3
Lithuania	3	3	0	0
Luxembourg	2	2	0	0
Macedonia	3	3	0	0
Malta	4	4	0	0
Mexico	3	2	1	0
Netherlands	3	0	0	3
Nigeria	1	1	0	0
Northern Ireland	2	1	1	0
Norway	2	1	0	1
Paraguay	1	0	0	1
Poland	2	0	0	2
Republic of Ireland	2	1	0	1
Romania	2	1	0	1
Russia	7	1	4	2
San Marino	2	2	0	0
Slovakia	3	2	1	0
Slovenia	4	0	4	0
South Korea	5	1	3	1
Spain	5	0	3	2
Switzerland	4	1	3	0
Tunisia	2	2	0	0
Ukraine	2	0	0	2
United States	1	1	0	0
Uruguay	2	1	1	0
Wales	2	2	0	0

== Honours ==
=== Friendly ===
- Lunar New Year Cup
  - Champions (1): 1995
- Millennium Super Cup
  - Champions (1): 2001
- Korea Cup
  - Runners-up (1): 1997
- Kirin Cup
  - Runners-up (1): 2004

=== Awards ===
- FIFA Best Mover of the Year 1997

== See also ==
- Serbia and Montenegro national football team results
