= 1997 Korea Cup =

Tournament details
- Host country: South Korea
- Dates: 12–16 June
- Teams: 4

Final positions
- Champions: South Korea (12th title)
- Runners-up: FR Yugoslavia

Tournament statistics
- Matches played: 6
- Goals scored: 15 (2.5 per match)
- Top scorer(s): (Federal Republic of Yugoslavia) Rade Bogdanović (South Korea) Choi Moon-sik (South Korea) Seo Jung-won (Federal Republic of Yugoslavia) Slaviša Jokanović (2 goals each)
- Best player(s): (South Korea) Ha Seok-ju

The 1997 Korea Cup (Korean: 97 코리아컵 국제축구대회) was the 22nd competition of Korea Cup. It was held from 12 to 16 June 1997, and was won by South Korea for the 12th time.

== Squads ==
Team	FIFA Ranking	Recent result	Continent
South Korea	36th place	1996 AFC Asian Cup quarter-finals	AFC
Egypt	33rd place	1996 African Cup of Nations quarter-finals	CAF
Ghana	35th place	1996 African Cup of Nations 4th place	CAF
FR Yugoslavia	48th place	—	UEFA

== Standings ==
Pos	Team	Pld	W	D	L	GF	GA	GD	Pts
1	South Korea (C, H)	3	2	1	0	7	2	+5	7
2	FR Yugoslavia	3	1	2	0	4	2	+2	5
3	Egypt	3	1	1	1	3	3	0	4
4	Ghana	3	0	0	3	1	8	−7	0

Source: RSSSF
(C) Champions; (H) Hosts

== Matches ==
12 June 1997
17:00 (UTC+9)

FR Yugoslavia	3–1	Ghana
Jokanović 57' (pen.); Bogdanović 68', 90'	Report	R. Boateng 56'

Seoul Olympic Stadium, Seoul
Referee: Ahn Bong-ki (South Korea)

12 June 1997
19:00 (UTC+9)

South Korea	3–1	Egypt
Park Kun-ha 12'; Yoo Sang-chul 65'; Choi Moon-sik 77'	Report	Khashaba 23'

Seoul Olympic Stadium, Seoul
Attendance: 23,830
Referee: Selearajen Subramaniam (Malaysia)

14 June 1997
17:00 (UTC+9)

South Korea	3–0	Ghana
Seo Jung-won 5'; Choi Moon-sik 49'; Choi Yong-soo 54'	Report

Suwon Sports Complex, Suwon
Attendance: 7,329
Referee: Russamee Jindamai (Thailand)

14 June 1997
19:00 (UTC+9)

FR Yugoslavia	0–0	Egypt
	Report

Suwon Sports Complex, Suwon
Referee: Kwon Jong-cheol (South Korea)

16 June 1997
17:00 (UTC+9)

Egypt	2–0	Ghana
Emam 14'; Sabry 80'	Report

Seoul Olympic Stadium, Seoul
Referee: Park Hae-yong (South Korea)

16 June 1997
19:00 (UTC+9)

South Korea	1–1	FR Yugoslavia
Seo Jung-won 19'	Report	Jokanović 55' (pen.)

Seoul Olympic Stadium, Seoul
Attendance: 21,563
Referee: Selearajen Subramaniam (Malaysia)

== See also ==
- Korea Cup
- South Korea national football team results
